= Markus Jürgenson =

Estonian footballer

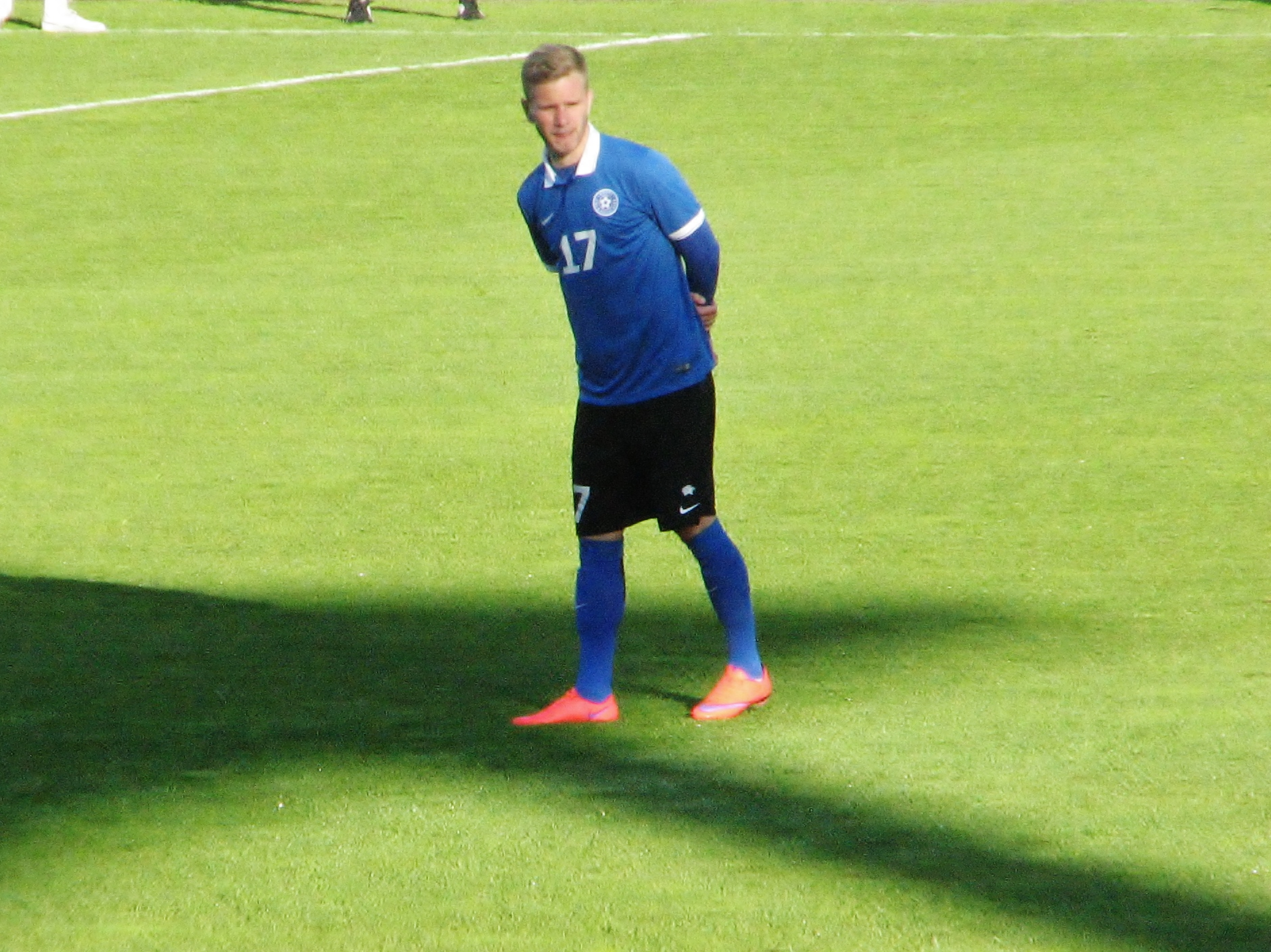
- Jürgenson with Estonia in 2015

Personal information
- Full name: Markus Jürgenson
- Date of birth: 9 September 1987 (age 39)
- Place of birth: Tõravere, Estonia
- Height: 1.80 m (5 ft 11 in)
- Position: Right back

Youth career
- 2002–2005: Tammeka

Senior career*
Years	Team	Apps	(Gls)
2004	Tammeka II	14	(10)
2003–2006	Tammeka	66	(6)
2007	TVMK II	11	(1)
2006–2008	TVMK	53	(8)
2009–2011	Flora II	6	(1)
2008–2016	Flora	252	(37)
2017	VPS	23	(2)
2018–2022	FCI Levadia	105	(13)

International career^{‡}
2006–2008	Estonia U21	6	(0)
2010	Estonia U23	1	(0)
2010–2018	Estonia	11	(0)
- * Club domestic league appearances and goals as of 7 December 2022 ‡ National team caps and goals as of 7 December 2019

Markus Jürgenson (born 9 September 1987) is an Estonian professional footballer who last played as a right back for Estonian club FCI Levadia.

== Club career ==
=== Tammeka ===
Jürgenson came through the youth system at Tammeka. He made his debut in the Meistriliiga on 16 March 2005, in a 2–2 home draw against Merkuur.

=== TVMK ===
In December 2006, Jürgenson signed a three-year contract with TVMK.

=== Flora ===
On 16 November 2008, Jürgenson signed with Flora. He won his first Meistriliiga title in the 2010 season. Jürgenson won two more league titles in 2011 and 2015. On 8 November 2016, Flora announced Jürgenson's contract would not be extended for the next season. During his eight seasons with the club, Jürgenson had become a fans' favourite, having won three Meistriliiga titles, four Estonian Cups and five Estonian Supercups, amassing a total of 328 appearances and scoring 56 goals, including 252 appearances and 37 goals in the Meistriliiga.

=== VPS ===
On 10 February 2017, Jürgenson signed with Finnish club VPS on a one-year contract, with option of another.

=== FCI Levadia ===
On 19 January 2018, Jürgenson returned to Estonia and joined FCI Levadia on a one-year deal with an option to extend the contract for another year. In November 2022 Jürgenson announced his departure from Levadia after five seasons and five titles with the club: 1 League title, 2 cups and 2 supercups.

== International career ==
Jürgenson began his international career for Estonia with the under-21 national team in 2006. In December 2010, he was called up by manager Tarmo Rüütli for Estonia friendlies against China PR and Qatar. Jürgenson made his senior international debut for Estonia on 18 December, playing full 90 minutes in a 0–3 away loss to China PR.

== Career statistics ==
=== Club ===
As of 7 December 2018.

Appearances and goals by club, season and competition
Club	Season	League			Cup (Note: Includes the Estonian Cup and Finnish Cup)		Europe		Other		Total	
Club	Season	Division	Apps	Goals	Apps	Goals	Apps	Goals	Apps	Goals	Apps	Goals
Tammeka II	2004	V liiga	14	10	—		—		—		14	10
Tammeka	2003	Esiliiga	4	0	0	0	—		—		4	0
Tammeka	2005	Meistriliiga	32	1	—		—		—		32	1
Tammeka	2006	Meistriliiga	30	5	2	2	—		—		32	7
Tammeka	Total		66	6	2	2	—		—		68	8
TVMK II	2007	Esiliiga	11	1	—		—		—		11	1
TVMK	2007	Meistriliiga	20	3	3	0	1 (Note: Appearance in UEFA Intertoto Cup)	0	4 (Note: Appearances in Baltic League)	0	28	3
TVMK	2008	Meistriliiga	33	5	1	0	2 (Note: Appearance(s) in UEFA Cup/UEFA Europa League)	0	4	0	40	5
TVMK	Total		53	8	4	0	3	0	8	0	68	8
Flora II	2009	Esiliiga	5	0	0	0	—		—		5	0
Flora II	2011	Esiliiga	1	1	0	0	—		—		1	1
Flora II	Total		6	1	0	0	—		—		6	1
Flora	2009	Meistriliiga	26	2	5	1	2	0	3 (Note: One appearance in Estonian Supercup, two appearances in Baltic League)	0	36	3
Flora	2010	Meistriliiga	33	2	6	1	2	0	7 (Note: One appearance in Estonian Supercup, six appearances in Baltic League)	0	48	3
Flora	2011	Meistriliiga	34	4	6	5	2 (Note: Appearance(s) in UEFA Champions League)	0	5 (Note: Two appearances in Baltic Champions Cup, one appearance in Estonian Supercup, two appearances in Baltic League)	0	47	9
Flora	2012	Meistriliiga	33	4	5	1	1	0	1 (Note: Appearance in Estonian Supercup)	1	40	6
Flora	2013	Meistriliiga	32	3	7	2	2	0	—		41	5
Flora	2014	Meistriliiga	30	9	4	2	—		1	0	35	11
Flora	2015	Meistriliiga	32	8	4	2	2	0	—		38	10
Flora	2016	Meistriliiga	32	5	5	4	2	0	0	0	39	9
Flora	Total		252	37	42	18	13	0	17	1	324	56
VPS	2017	Veikkausliiga	23	2	3	0	1	0	—		27	2
FCI Levadia	2018	Meistriliiga	34	1	4	0	2	0	1	0	41	1
Career total			459	66	55	20	19	0	26	1	559	87

=== International ===
As of 7 December 2018.

Appearances and goals by national team and year
National team	Year	Apps	Goals
Estonia
Estonia	2010	2	0
Estonia	2014	2	0
Estonia	2015	2	0
Estonia	2016	3	0
Estonia	2018	2	0
Total		11	0

== Honours ==
=== Club ===
Flora

- Meistriliiga: 2010, 2011, 2015
- Estonian Cup: 2008–09, 2010–11, 2012–13, 2015–16
- Estonian Supercup: 2009, 2011, 2012, 2014, 2016

FCI Levadia

- Meistriliiga: 2021
- Estonian Cup: 2017–18, 2020–21
- Estonian Supercup: 2018, 2022
