= 2008–09 Estonian Cup =

Estonian football competition

Eesti Karikas

Tournament details
- Country: Estonia
- Teams: 84

Final positions
- Champions: Flora
- Runners-up: Nõmme Kalju

Tournament statistics
- Matches played: 79
- Goals scored: 432 (5.47 per match)

The 2008–09 Estonian Cup was the 19th season of the Estonian football knockout tournament. Winners of the cup qualified for the second qualifying round of the 2009–10 UEFA Europa League. The defending champions were Flora Tallinn, who successfully defended their title this year.

== First round ==
Team 1	Score	Team 2
22 July
Nõmme United	7–1	Igiliikur
Tulevik II	10–0	Eston Villa
23 July
Võru	1–2 (a.e.t.)	Vaprus
Elva II	3–2	Olympic
Linnugripp	1–3	Lootos
Elva	2–1	Jalgpallihaigla
Kaitseliit Kalev	2–3	Kalju II
Kristiine	0–11	Nõmme Kalju
30 July
Maag Tammeka II	w/o	Keskerakond
Kadakas	6–2	Real
Atli	0–8	Tallinna Kalev
Lootus	2–0	Toompea 1994
Maag Tammeka	3–0	SK-10 Premium
6 August
Flora U21	6–2	Trans II
Kumake	1–13	Paide
Rakvere	9–1	Flora Järva-Jaani SK
Maaülikooli SK	0–10	Levadia
Tallinna Kalev II	1–3	HÜJK
HaServ	w/o	Tempori
Orbiit	w/o	Kalevi SK

The following teams received a bye in this round:

League	Teams
Meistriliiga	Flora, TVMK, Narva Trans, Tulevik, Sillamäe Kalev
Esiliiga	Kuressaare, Lasnamäe Ajax, Warrior, Tamme Auto
Second League	Anži, Alko, Santos, Tabasalu PK, Sörve, Tarvastu, Ganvix, Warrior II
Third League	Saue, Piraaja, Lasnamäe Ajax Veteranid, Eurouniv, EBS Team, Ülikool Fauna, Metec, Noorus 96, Rada, Esteve, Kotkad, Atletik, Toompea, Püsivus, Haiba, Lelle, Vaprus III
Fourth League	HansaNet.ee, Enter, Soccernet, Quattromed, Otepää, Twister, Tribling, WC Guwalda, Kose, Dagöplast

== Second round ==
Team 1	Score	Team 2
5 August
Vaprus	5–2	Tabasalu PK
6 August
TVMK	2–3	Nõmme Kalju
Sillamäe Kalev	6–0	Kose
Tamme Auto	7–1	Rada
Nõmme United	2–5	HaServ
Kotkad	0–1	Flora
Püsivus	1–3	Ülikool Fauna
Atletik	0–2	Orbiit
7 August
Soccernet	0–10	Toompea
Warrior	3–1	Vaprus III
12 August
Warrior II	2–7	Tallinna Kalev
Anži	6–2	Eurouniv
13 August
Quattromed	2–6	Tulevik
Piraaja	1–0 (a.e.t.)	Sörve
Santos	2–5	Lootus
Tulevik II	10–0	EBS Team
14 August
Otepää	1–3	Kuressaare
19 August
Enter	0–2	Levadia
20 August
Narva Trans	5–0	Rakvere
Twister	1–6	Lootos
Dagöplast	4–0	WC Guwalda
Alko	w/o	Haiba
Paide	6–2	Metec
Lelle	1–6	Elva
Kalju II	11–0	Kadakas
Saue	3–6	Maag Tammeka
Esteve	5–2	Noorus 96
HansaNet.ee	1–4	Maag Tammeka II
HÜJK	3–0	Tribling
21 August
Ganvix	2–0	Tarvastu
27 August
Elva II	4–1	Lasnamäe Ajax Veteranid
Lasnamäe Ajax	2–1	Flora U21

== Third round ==
Team 1	Score	Team 2
2 September
Warrior	1–4	Maag Tammeka
3 September
Tamme Auto	1–8	Flora
Levadia	12–0	Esteve
Vaprus	w/o^{1}	Ganvix
Tallinna Kalev	4–0	Lasnamäe Ajax
HaServ	0–4	Sillamäe Kalev
Piraaja	0–3	Orbiit
4 September
Paide	1–5	Tulevik
6 September
Maag Tammeka II	0–1	Nõmme Kalju
9 September
Narva Trans	4–2	Lootus
Elva	3–10	Toompea
Anži	1–3 (a.e.t.)	Lootos
Tulevik II	8–1	Dagöplast
11 September
Kuressaare	1–0 (a.e.t.)	Alko
17 September
Elva II	2–0	Ülikool Fauna
Kalju II	4–1	HÜJK

Notes

- ^{1} Vaprus were disqualified from the competition because of the use of an ineligible player in their game against Ganvix.

== Fourth round ==
Team 1	Score	Team 2
23 September
Tulevik	1–2	Nõmme Kalju
24 September
Tulevik II	0–10	Levadia
Lootos	0–2	Maag Tammeka
1 October
Elva II	2–3 (a.e.t.)	Kalju II
8 October
Orbiit	1–3	Flora
11 October
Sillamäe Kalev	3–1	Kuressaare
Tallinna Kalev	0–2	Narva Trans
26 October
Ganvix	2–0	Toompea

== Quarter-finals ==
14 April 2009	Narva Trans	3–1	Levadia	Narva
18:00 EEST	Bazyukin 15'; Tarassenkov 17', 63' (pen.)	Report	Gussev 82' (pen.)	Stadium: Kreenholmi staadion Attendance: 120; Referee: Hannes Kaasik

15 April 2009	Ganvix	1–4	Nõmme Kalju	Türi
18:00 EEST	Karus 49'	Report	Nunes 19', 22', 71', 73'	Stadium: Türi linnastaadion Attendance: 250; Referee: Neeme Neemlaid

15 April 2009	Tammeka	0–3	Sillamäe Kalev	Tartu
18:45 EEST		Report	A. Kulik 49', 51'; V. Kulik 90+4'	Stadium: Annelinna kunstmuruväljak Attendance: 160; Referee: Eiko Saar

15 April 2009	Flora	4–0	Kalju II	Tallinn
18:45 EEST	Jürgenson 29'; Mööl 68'; Anier 76'; Vunk 82' (pen.)	Report		Stadium: Sportland Arena; Attendance: 85; Referee: Martin Salong

== Semi-finals ==
28 April 2009	Narva Trans	0–3	Flora	Narva
18:05 EEST		Report	Tamm 36'; Zahovaiko 84', 90+2'	Stadium: Kreenholmi staadion Attendance: 200; Referee: Silver Kõiv

29 April 2009	Sillamäe Kalev	0–0 (a.e.t.) (2–3 p)	Nõmme Kalju	Sillamäe
18:00 EEST		Report		Stadium: Kalevi staadion Attendance: 390; Referee: Eiko Saar
	Penalties
	Ametov (penalty missed); A. Kulik (penalty scored); Naumov (penalty scored); Gruznov (penalty missed); V. Kulik (penalty missed)		(penalty scored) Hurt; (penalty scored) Pimentel; (penalty missed) Mitt; (penalty missed) Leetma; (penalty scored) Nunes

== Final ==
12 May 2009
18:45 EEST

Flora	0–0 (a.e.t.)	Nõmme Kalju
	Report
Penalties
Zahovaiko (penalty scored); Kasimir (penalty scored); Vunk (penalty missed); Vanna (penalty scored); Dupikov (penalty scored)	4–3	(penalty scored) Smirnov; (penalty scored) Rõškevitš; (penalty scored) Pimentel; (penalty missed) Hurt; (penalty missed) Nunes

Kadrioru staadion, Tallinn
Attendance: 2,000
Referee: Kristo Tohver

Flora	Kalju

FC FLORA TALLINN:
GK	25	(Estonia) Mihkel Aksalu
RB	16	(Estonia) Markus Jürgenson	(yellow card) 39'
CB	15	(Estonia) Tõnis Vanna
CB	24	(Estonia) Karl Palatu
LB	19	(Estonia) Gert Kams
CM	33	(Estonia) Aivar Anniste		(substituted off) 70'
CM	5	(Estonia) Siksten Kasimir
RM	8	(Estonia) Oliver Konsa		(substituted off) 105+1'
CM	6	(Estonia) Martin Vunk
LM	10	(Estonia) Henri Anier
CF	9	(Estonia) Joonas Tamm	(yellow card) 30'	(substituted off) 60'
Substitutes:
GK	1	(Estonia) Stanislav Pedõk
DF	22	(Estonia) Mikk Reintam
MF	2	(Estonia) Ken Kallaste
MF	7	(Estonia) Sergei Mošnikov	(yellow card) 119'	(substituted on) 105+1'
MF	17	(Estonia) Henri Rüütli
FW	14	(Estonia) Vjatšeslav Zahovaiko	(yellow card) 76'	(substituted on) 70'
FW	20	(Estonia) Alo Dupikov		(substituted on) 60'
Manager:
(Estonia) Tarmo Rüütli

JK NÕMME KALJU:
GK	31	(Estonia) Rene Kaas
RB	7	(Brazil) Marcio Pimentel	(yellow card) 35'
CB	2	(Estonia) Mikk Haavistu	(yellow card) 74'
CB	25	(Estonia) Martin Hurt
LB	8	(Brazil) Alan Arruda
RM	9	(Estonia) Maksim Smirnov	(yellow card) 108'
CM	28	(Estonia) Jevgeni Novikov		(substituted off) 91'
CM	16	(Brazil) Murilo Maccari		(substituted off) 67'
LM	18	(Estonia) Sergei Terehhov	(red card) 95'
AM	5	(Brazil) Felipe Nunes
CF	19	(Estonia) Miroslav Rõškevitš
Substitutes:
GK	1	(Estonia) Daniil Savitski
DF	4	(Estonia) Risto Kägo
DF	12	(Estonia) Martin Tšegodajev
DF	24	(Estonia) Kristofer Kask
MF	11	(Estonia) Tõnis Kaukvere		(substituted on) 91'
MF	14	(Estonia) Janar Tükk		(substituted on) 67'
FW	27	(Estonia) Anti Kõlu
Manager:
(Brazil) Fredo Getulio

== Top scorers ==
Rank	Scorer	Club	Goals
1	(Brazil) Felipe Nunes	Nõmme Kalju	10
2	(Russia) Nikita Andreev	Levadia	9
2	(Estonia) Argo Arbeiter	Toompea	9
4	(Estonia) Alar Alve	Lootos	6
4	(Estonia) Deniss Vassiljev	Kalju II	6
4	(Estonia) Atko Väikmeri	Toompea	6
7	(Russia) Yaroslav Dmitriev	Levadia	5
7	(Estonia) Kristjan Tiirik	Tammeka / Narva Trans	5 + 0
9	(Estonia) Jarmo Ahjupera	Flora	4
9	(Ukraine) Irfan Ametov	Sillamäe Kalev	4
9	(Estonia) Andreas Aniko	Kalju II	4
9	(Estonia) Alo Dupikov	Sillamäe Kalev / Flora	4 + 0
9	(Estonia) Jaagup Luhakooder	Tulevik II	4
9	(Estonia) Nikolai Lõsanov	Narva Trans	4
9	(Estonia) Herkki Orro	Paide	4
9	(Estonia) Karlis Seire	Paide	4
9	(Estonia) Joonas Tamm	Tulevik II / Flora	3 + 1
9	(Estonia) Ingemar Teever	Nõmme Kalju	4
