= 2009 Meistriliiga =

Estonian national championships in football

Meistriliiga
- Season: 2009
- Champions: Levadia (7th title)
- Relegated: Tallinna Kalev
- Champions League: Levadia
- Europa League: Sillamäe Kalev; Trans
- Baltic League: Levadia; Sillamäe Kalev; Trans; Flora; Nõmme Kalju
- Matches: 180
- Goals: 590 (3.28 per match)
- Top goalscorer: Vitali Gussev (26)
- Biggest home win: Kalju 10–0 Paide; Trans 10–0 Kuressaare
- Biggest away win: Tammeka 0–8 Sillamäe Kalev
- Highest scoring: Kalju 10–0 Paide; Trans 10–0 Kuressaare

The 2009 Meistriliiga was the 19th season of the Meistriliiga, Estonia's premier football league. It started on 7 March 2009 and ended on 10 November 2009. Levadia won their seventh title.

== Changes from the previous season ==
TVMK were disbanded after the end of the previous season. Hence Vaprus, who originally were to be directly relegated, faced Esiliiga side Paide Linnameeskond in a relegation play-off series for one spot in Meistriliiga 2009. With an aggregate 5–5, Paide Linnameeskond won the promotion play-off against Vaprus on the away goals rule and play their first season in Estonian top division. Tallinna Kalev, who originally were to participate in the relegation series, were spared.

Kuressaare earned promotion to the 2009 Meistriliiga after finishing in second place in the 2008 Esiliiga; champions Levadia II were not eligible to be promoted.

Maag Tammeka changed their name to Tammeka following the loss of a major sponsor.

== Overview ==
Location of teams in Meistriliiga 2009

Club	Location	Stadium	Capacity	Manager
Flora	Tallinn	A. Le Coq Arena	9,300	(Estonia) Tarmo Rüütli
Kalju	Tallinn	Hiiu Stadium	500	(Brazil) Getúlio Fredo
Kuressaare	Kuressaare	Kuressaare Linnastaadion	2,000	(Estonia) Jan Važinski
Levadia	Tallinn	Kadrioru Stadium	4,750	(Estonia) Igor Prins
Paide Linnameeskond	Paide	ÜG Stadium	268	(Estonia) Viktor Mets
Sillamäe Kalev	Sillamäe	Kalevi Stadium	2,000	(Russia) Anatoli Ushanov
Tallinna Kalev	Tallinn	Kalevi Keskstaadion	12,000	(Estonia) Daniel Meijel
Tammeka	Tartu	Tamme Stadium	2,000	(Estonia) Norbert Hurt
Trans	Narva	Kreenholmi Stadium	3,000	(Estonia) Sergei Ratnikov
Tulevik	Viljandi	Viljandi Linnastaadion	2,500	(Estonia) Marko Lelov

== League table ==
Pos	Team	Pld	W	D	L	GF	GA	GD	Pts	Qualification or relegation
1	Levadia (C)	36	31	4	1	121	23	+98	97	Qualification for Champions League second qualifying round
2	Sillamäe Kalev	36	24	4	8	85	40	+45	76	Qualification for Europa League second qualifying round
3	Trans	36	23	7	6	82	29	+53	76	Qualification for Europa League first qualifying round (Note: The winner of the 2009–10 Estonian Cup, Levadia have already qualified for Champions League, that means Flora will qualify for the 2010–11 UEFA Europa League 1st qualifying round as cup runners-up.)
4	Flora	36	22	6	8	79	31	+48	72	Qualification for Europa League first qualifying round
5	Kalju	36	15	9	12	65	47	+18	54	
6	Tulevik	36	15	6	15	55	49	+6	51	
7	Tammeka	36	7	3	26	29	86	−57	24	
8	Kuressaare	36	7	3	26	21	99	−78	24	
9	Paide Linnameeskond (O)	36	6	4	26	21	97	−76	22	Qualification for relegation play-offs
10	Tallinna Kalev (R)	36	4	4	28	32	89	−57	16	Relegation to Esiliiga

Source: Estonian Football Association (in Estonian)
Rules for classification: 1st points; 2nd least withdrawals or annulled matches; 3rd overall wins; 4th head-to-head points; 5th head-to-head goal difference; 6th goal difference; 7th goals scored.
If two or more teams on the top have the same number of points by the end of the season, the aforementioned rules will not apply and additional game(s) will be played to determine the champions
(C) Champions; (O) Play-off winners; (R) Relegated

=== Relegation play-off ===
The ninth placed team of Meistriliiga and the runners-up of Esiliiga will compete in a two-legged relegation play-off for one spot in 2010 Meistriliiga.

15 November 2009
13:00

Warrior	0–1	Paide Linnameeskond
	Report	Pebre 48'

Sportland Arena, Tallinn
Attendance: 110
Referee: Roomer Tarajev

21 November 2009
13:00

Paide Linnameeskond	1–1	Warrior
Leetma 8'	Report	Danelson 75'

Paide kunstmuruväljak, Paide
Attendance: 170
Referee: Jaan Roos

Paide Linnameeskond wins 2–1 on aggregate and retains their spot in next season's Meistriliiga.

== Results ==
Each team plays every opponent four times, twice at home and twice on the road, for a total of 36 games.

=== First half of season ===
Home \ Away	FLO	NÕM	KUR	LEV	PAI	SIL	T.K	TAM	TRA	TUL
Flora		0–0	3–0	1–3	4–0	4–1	1–0	2–1	1–1	1–0
Nõmme Kalju	0–1		6–1	1–2	3–0	1–3	2–1	4–0	1–2	1–1
Kuressaare	1–0	1–2		1–7	1–0	0–1	0–1	0–0	0–5	0–3
Levadia	3–2	3–1	3–0		2–0	3–1	4–1	8–0	2–0	5–0
Paide	0–6	0–3	0–0	0–3		0–2	1–0	3–1	0–5	0–1
Sillamäe Kalev	3–2	2–0	0–1	1–1	6–0		2–0	5–0	2–1	1–0
Tallinna Kalev	0–2	1–2	1–1	2–2	0–0	1–1		0–4	2–4	0–1
Tammeka	0–4	1–2	2–0	0–2	0–2	0–8	0–3		1–4	1–1
Trans	1–2	3–0	2–0	0–3	3–0 (Note: The match was declared 3–0 for Narva Trans because Paide LM used ineligible players.)	1–2	3–1	3–1		1–1
Tulevik	1–1	0–2	3–0	0–7	1–0	1–3	2–1	3–0	1–2	

Source: Estonian Football Association (in Estonian)
Legend: Blue = home team win; Yellow = draw; Red = away team win.

=== Second half of season ===
Home \ Away	FLO	NÕM	KUR	LEV	PAI	SIL	T.K	TAM	TRA	TUL
Flora		2–2	3–0	1–3	0–0	4–0	4–1	2–1	1–2	4–1
Nõmme Kalju	3–2		1–0	1–3	10–0	1–1	3–4	1–1	2–2	1–1
Kuressaare	0–3	0–0 (Note: The match was awarded as lost for both teams with no goals counted, because both Kuressaare and Kalju used an ineligible player. The original result was 2–3.)		1–3	4–1	0–3	2–0	0–2	0–7	0–4
Levadia	1–0	5–0	8–0		4–2	6–1	5–1	6–1	1–1	3–0
Paide	0–6	0–3	2–0	1–5		0–1	3–2	2–1	1–1	0–4
Sillamäe Kalev	1–3	1–1	5–1	0–1	3–0		7–0	3–0	0–2	3–1
Tallinna Kalev	1–2	0–2	1–4	0–1	3–2	2–6		1–6	0–2	0–2
Tammeka	0–4	0–1	1–2	0–2	1–0	1–2	1–0		0–1	0–3
Trans	0–0	0–0	10–0	2–1	4–1	0–1	1–0	2–0		3–1
Tulevik	0–1	3–2	6–0	0–0	4–0	1–3	4–1	0–1	0–1	

Source: Estonian Football Association (in Estonian)
Legend: Blue = home team win; Yellow = draw; Red = away team win.

== Season statistics ==
=== Top scorers ===
Rank	Player	Club	Goals
1	(Estonia) Vitali Gussev	Levadia	26
2	(Brazil) Felipe Nunes	Kalju	20
3	(Russia) Nikita Andreev	Levadia	17
4	(Estonia) Jüri Jevdokimov	Tulevik	14
5	(Estonia) Alo Dupikov	Flora	13
5	(Estonia) Vitali Leitan	Levadia	13
5	(Russia) Aleksei Naumov	Sillamäe Kalev	13
5	(Estonia) Aleksandr Tarassenkov	Trans	13
5	(Estonia) Vjatšeslav Zahovaiko	Flora	13
10	(Estonia) Konstantin Nahk	Levadia	12

=== Average attendance ===
Club	Average attendance
Nõmme JK Kalju	368
JK Sillamäe Kalev	232
Tartu JK Tammeka	221
FC Kuressaare	193
Tallinna FC Levadia	193
Paide Linnameeskond	182
Tallinna FC Flora	162
Viljandi JK Tulevik	124
JK Narva Trans	111
JK Tallinna Kalev	110
League average	190

== Awards ==
=== Monthly awards ===
Month	Manager of the Month		Player of the Month	
Month	Manager	Club	Player	Club
March	(Estonia) Igor Prins	Levadia	(Estonia) Jüri Jevdokimov	Tulevik
April	(Estonia) Igor Prins	Levadia	(Estonia) Vitali Gussev	Levadia
May	(Russia) Anatoli Ushanov	Sillamäe Kalev	(Estonia) Alo Dupikov	Flora
June	(Estonia) Igor Prins	Levadia	(Russia) Aleksei Naumov	Sillamäe Kalev
July	(Estonia) Tarmo Rüütli	Flora	(Estonia) Sander Puri	Levadia
August	(Estonia) Sergei Ratnikov	Levadia	(Lithuania) Tomas Rimas	Trans
September	(Estonia) Igor Prins	Levadia	(Estonia) Konstantin Nahk	Levadia
October	(Estonia) Igor Prins	Levadia	(Estonia) Eduard Ratnikov	Trans

== See also ==
- 2009 Esiliiga
