= Joonas Tamm =

Estonian footballer (born 1992)

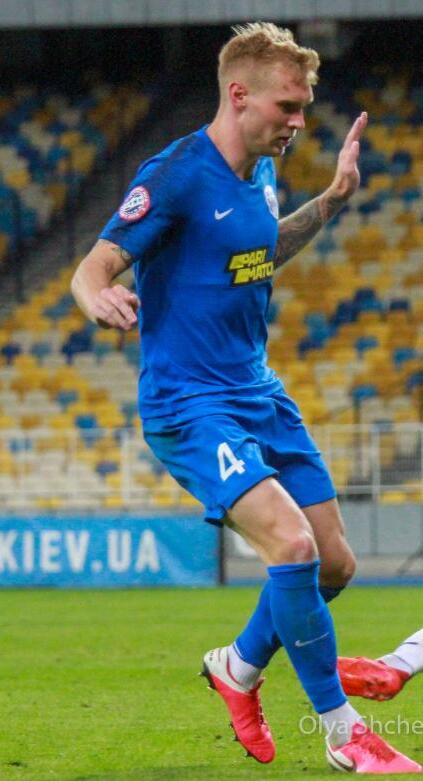
- Tamm with FC Desna Chernihiv in 2020

Personal information
- Full name: Joonas Tamm
- Date of birth: 2 February 1992 (age 34)
- Place of birth: Viljandi, Estonia
- Height: 1.92 m (6 ft 4 in)
- Position: Centre-back

Team information
- Current team: Sepsi OSK

Youth career
- 2003–2008: Tulevik
- 2009–2010: → Sampdoria (loan)

Senior career*
Years	Team	Apps	(Gls)
2008–2009	Tulevik	15	(0)
2008	Tulevik II	23	(24)
2009–2010	Flora	22	(3)
2009–2010	Flora II	6	(2)
2011–2013	IFK Norrköping	5	(0)
2011	→ IF Sylvia (loan)	4	(1)
2013	→ IF Sylvia (loan)	8	(4)
2014–2015	Trelleborgs FF	23	(3)
2015	Tulevik	15	(9)
2015–2019	Flora	83	(6)
2018	→ Sarpsborg 08 (loan)	25	(2)
2019	→ Korona Kielce (loan)	6	(0)
2019	→ Korona Kielce II (loan)	5	(0)
2019	→ Lillestrøm (loan)	15	(0)
2020–2021	Desna Chernihiv	33	(2)
2021–2022	Vorskla Poltava	15	(1)
2022	→ Flora (loan)	13	(1)
2022–2023	FCSB	35	(3)
2023–2025	Botev Plovdiv	49	(0)
2025–	Sepsi OSK	12	(0)

International career^{‡}
2007	Estonia U16	2	(1)
2008	Estonia U17	13	(1)
2009	Estonia U18	1	(0)
2009–2011	Estonia U19	24	(4)
2011	Estonia U21	2	(0)
2016	Estonia U23	1	(0)
2011–	Estonia	68	(4)
- * Club domestic league appearances and goals as of 7 March 2026 ‡ National team caps and goals as of 26 September 2026

Joonas Tamm (born 2 February 1992) is an Estonian professional footballer who plays as a centre-back for Liga I club Sepsi OSK and the Estonia national team.

Tamm was named the Estonian Footballer of the Year in 2022.

== Club career ==
=== Tulevik ===
Tamm started out playing for hometown team Tulevik. He made his debut in the Meistriliiga on 29 March 2008, in a 1–1 home draw against Sillamäe Kalev.

=== Flora ===
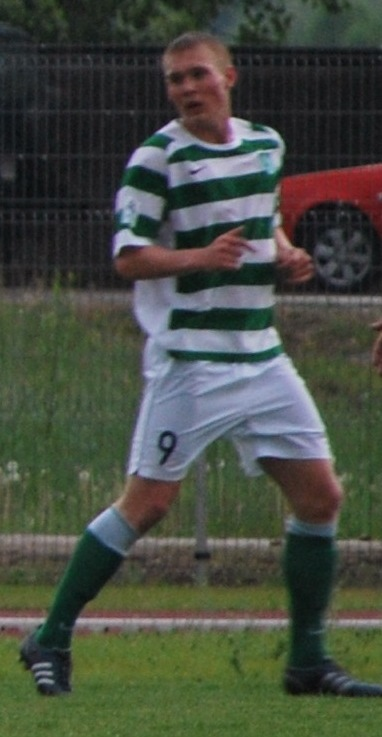
Tamm playing for Flora in 2009.

In February 2009, Tamm moved to Flora. He scored his first Meistriliiga goal on 9 May 2009, in a 4–0 away victory over Tammeka.

In August 2009, Tamm joined Italian club Sampdoria on a season-long loan, where he played for the club's Primavera side.

Tamm returned to Flora in August 2010. He helped the team win the Meistriliiga in 2010.

=== IFK Norrköping ===
On 27 December 2010, Tamm signed a three-year contract with Allsvenskan club IFK Norrköping, with the option to extend the contract for another year. In July 2011, he moved to Division 1 side IF Sylvia on loan. Tamm scored on his debut for the club on 9 July 2011, in a 2–1 away victory over Motala AIF. He made his debut in the Allsvenskan on 25 August 2011, in a 2–1 home victory over Djurgårdens IF.

=== Trelleborgs FF ===
On 2 December 2013, Tamm signed a one-year contract with Division 1 club Trelleborgs FF.

=== Return to Tulevik ===
On 9 February 2015, Tamm returned to his boyhood club, Tulevik, on a one-year contract. Positioned as a centre-forward, he went on to score 9 goals in 15 league appearances. On 2 May 2015, in the season 2015 he scored a Hat-tricks against Paide Linnameeskond.

=== Return to Flora ===
On 22 June 2015, Tamm joined his former club Flora for an undisclosed fee. He went on to help Flora win Meistriliiga titles in the 2015 and 2017 seasons.

==== Various loans ====
On 31 January 2018, Tamm joined Eliteserien club Sarpsborg 08 on a season-long loan. Starting from the first qualifying round, he helped the team reach the UEFA Europa League group stage. Tamm played in all six group stage matches as Sarpsborg 08 finished last in their group.

On 8 February 2019 Tamm joined Ekstraklasa club Korona Kielce on a six-month loan deal.

On 27 June 2019, Tamm moved to Eliteserien club Lillestrøm on loan until the end of the 2018–19 season, with the option to make the deal permanent.

=== Desna Chernihiv ===
In January 2020 he signed with FC Desna Chernihiv of the Ukrainian Premier League. Tamm helped his new club to a 4th-place finish in the 2019–20 Ukrainian Premier League and qualifying for the play-offs. On 16 July he scored against FC Oleksandriya during the play-offs.

On 22 August he scored in a 3–1 victory over Zorya Luhansk in the opening match of the 2020–21 Ukrainian Premier League season.

On 24 September he was included in the squad for the Europa League third qualifying round tie against VfL Wolfsburg at AOK Stadion.

=== Vorskla Poltava ===
On 28 May 2021 he signed for Vorskla Poltava and on 22 June started his preparation with the new club. With the club he played in the 2020–21 Europa League second qualifying round. On 21 November he scored his first goal of the 2021–22 season against FC Mariupol.

==== Loan to Flora ====
In March 2022, Tamm returned to Flora once again on loan until the end of the season due to the interruption of the Russian invasion of Ukraine. He played the first match on 9 March in the Estonian Cup against FCI Levadia, helping the side advance to the semi-final. On 12 April, he scored again against Kuressaare at the Kuressaare linnastaadion in Meistriliiga. He helped the club to win the Meistriliiga in 2022.

=== FCSB ===
On 10 July 2022, Tamm signed for Romanian Liga I club FCSB. On 24 July 2022, he made his debut in Liga I against Rapid București at the Stadionul Rapid-Giulești in Giulești. He scored his first goal for the club in a league match against Craiova on 31 July. He was later chosen for the league's Team of the Week. On 3 August he scored his first goal in the UEFA Europa Conference League against DAC Dunajská Streda at the MOL Aréna in Dunajská Streda providing the 1–0 away victory for his team. On 14 August he scored the winning goal in a league game against Chindia Targoviste and again was named to the Team of the Week.

=== Botev Plovdiv ===
In July 2023, Tamm signed a contract with Bulgarian club Botev Plovdiv.

=== Sepsi OSK Sfântu Gheorghe ===
On 3 July 2025 he signed for Sepsi OSK in Liga II.

== International career ==
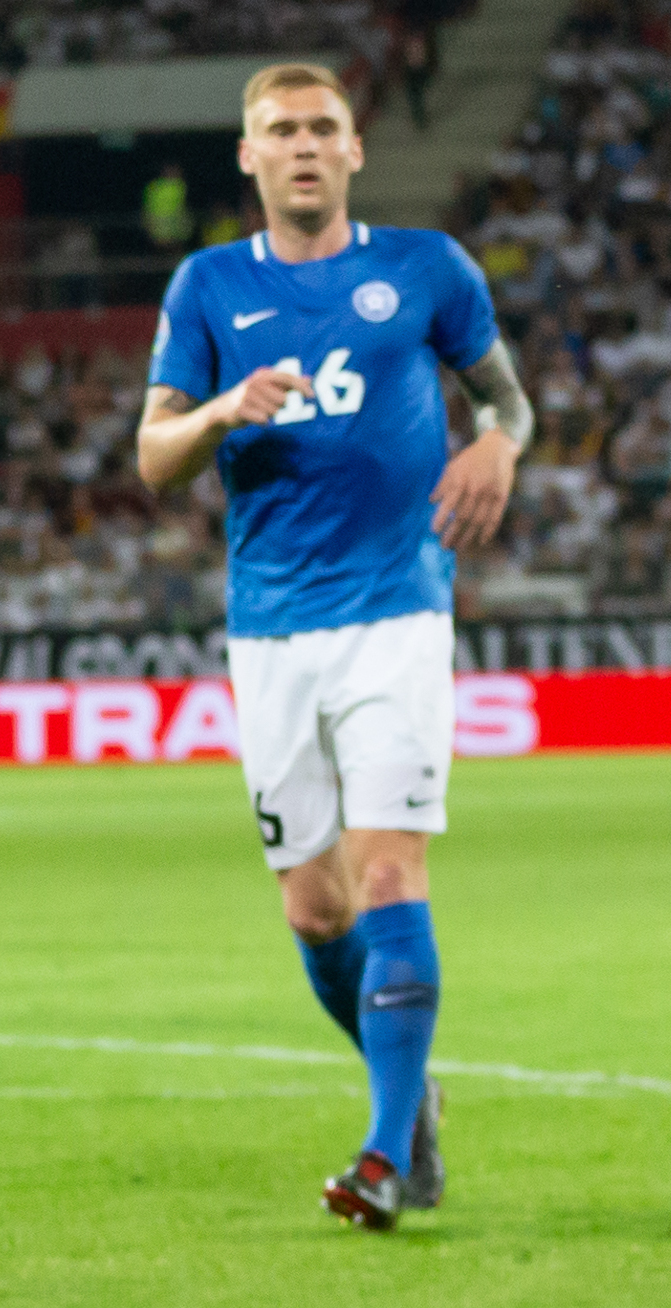
Tamm with Estonia in 2019

Tamm has represented Estonia at all levels, from the under-16 side to senior squad. He represented Estonia's under-17 team at the 2008 Under-17 Baltic Cup, eventually reaching the final. On 10 June 2011, he was named by manager Tarmo Rüütli to the Estonian senior squad to face Chile and Uruguay in friendly matches. He made his senior debut for the on 19 June in a 4–0 away defeat to Chile. Tamm scored his first international goals on 7 October 2017, when he scored a second-half hat trick in a 6–0 away victory over Gibraltar in 2018 FIFA World Cup qualification. In doing so, he became the first player to score a hat-trick for Estonia since 1996. He won the 2020 Baltic Cup with Estonia, playing in the final against Lithuania. On 2 June 2022 he scored against San Marino in UEFA Nations League D play in Tallinn.

== Career statistics ==
=== Club ===
As of match played 7 March 2026

Appearances and goals by club, season and competition
Club	Season	League			National cup (Note: Includes Estonian Cup, Ukrainian Cup, Bulgarian Cup)		Continental		Other		Total	
Club	Season	Division	Apps	Goals	Apps	Goals	Apps	Goals	Apps	Goals	Apps	Goals
Tulevik	2008	Meistriliiga	15	0	0	0	—		—		15	0
Tulevik II	2008	II liiga	23	24	4	3	—		—		27	27
Flora	2009	Meistriliiga	9	1	2	1	1 (Note: Appearance(s) in UEFA Europa League)	0	1 (Note: Appearance in Estonian Supercup)	0	13	2
Flora	2010	Meistriliiga	13	2	1	1	0	0	1 (Note: Appearance in Baltic League)	0	15	3
Flora	Total		22	3	3	2	1	0	2	0	28	5
Flora II	2009	Esiliiga	3	1	0	0	—		—		3	1
Flora II	2010	Esiliiga	3	1	0	0	—		—		3	1
Flora II	Total		6	2	0	0	—		—		6	2
IFK Norrköping	2011	Allsvenskan	1	0	0	0	—		—		1	0
IFK Norrköping	2012	Allsvenskan	2	0	0	0	—		—		2	0
IFK Norrköping	2013	Allsvenskan	2	0	0	0	—		—		2	0
IFK Norrköping	Total		5	0	0	0	—		—		5	0
IF Sylvia (loan)	2011	Division 1	4	1	—		—		1 (Note: Appearance in Division 1 promotion play-offs)	0	5	1
IF Sylvia (loan)	2013	Division 1	8	4	—		—		—		8	4
IF Sylvia (loan)	Total		12	5	—		—		1	0	13	5
Trelleborgs FF	2014	Division 1	23	3	—		—		—		23	3
Tulevik	2015	Meistriliiga	15	9	0	0	—		—		15	9
Flora	2015	Meistriliiga	18	1	3	5	2	0	—		23	6
Flora	2016	Meistriliiga	31	2	5	0	1 (Note: Appearance in UEFA Champions League)	0	1	0	38	2
Flora	2017	Meistriliiga	34	3	0	0	2	0	0	0	36	3
Flora	Total		83	6	8	5	5	0	1	0	97	11
Sarpsborg 08 (loan)	2018	Eliteserien	25	2	0	0	12	0	—		37	2
Korona Kielce (loan)	2018–19	Ekstraklasa	6	0	0	0	—		—		6	0
Korona Kielce II (loan)	2018–19	IV liga Świętokrzyskie	5	0	—		—		—		5	0
Lillestrøm (loan)	2019	Eliteserien	15	0	0	0	0	0	1 (Note: Appearance in Eliteserien relegation play-offs)	0	16	0
Desna Chernihiv	2019–20	Ukrainian Premier League	13	1	1	0	0	0	—		14	1
Desna Chernihiv	2020–21	Ukrainian Premier League	20	1	2	0	1	0	—		23	1
Desna Chernihiv	Total		33	2	3	0	1	0	—		37	2
Vorskla Poltava	2021–22	Ukrainian Premier League	15	1	1	0	1 (Note: Appearance(s) in UEFA Europa Conference League)	0	—		17	1
Flora (loan)	2022	Meistriliiga	13	1	2	0	0	0	—		15	1
FCSB	2022–23	Liga I	35	3	0	0	9	1	—		44	4
Botev Plovdiv	2023–24	Bulgarian First League	25	0	4	0	—		—		29	0
Botev Plovdiv	2024–25	Bulgarian First League	29	0	1	0	6	0	—		36	0
Botev Plovdiv	Total		54	0	5	0	6	0	—		65	0
Sepsi OSK	2025–26	Liga II	12	0	2	0	—		—		14	0
Sepsi OSK	2026–27	Liga I	0	0	0	0	—		—		0	0
Sepsi OSK	Total		12	0	2	0	—		—		14	0
Career total			417	61	28	10	35	1	5	0	485	72

=== International ===
As of match played 26 September 2026

Appearances and goals by national team and year
National team	Year	Apps	Goals
Estonia
Estonia	2011	2	0
Estonia	2012	3	0
Estonia	2013	0	0
Estonia	2014	0	0
Estonia	2015	0	0
Estonia	2016	2	0
Estonia	2017	9	3
Estonia	2018	11	0
Estonia	2019	8	0
Estonia	2020	5	0
Estonia	2021	6	0
Estonia	2022	6	1
Estonia	2023	0	0
Estonia	2024	12	0
Estonia	2025	3	0
Estonia	2026	1	0
Total		68	4

Scores and results list Estonia's goal tally first, score column indicates score after each Tamm goal.

List of international goals scored by Joonas Tamm
No.	Date	Venue	Cap	Opponent	Score	Result	Competition
1	7 October 2017	Estádio Algarve, Faro/Loulé, Portugal	10	Gibraltar	4–0	6–0	2018 FIFA World Cup qualification
2	7 October 2017	Estádio Algarve, Faro/Loulé, Portugal	10	Gibraltar	5–0	6–0	2018 FIFA World Cup qualification
3	7 October 2017	Estádio Algarve, Faro/Loulé, Portugal	10	Gibraltar	6–0	6–0	2018 FIFA World Cup qualification
4	2 June 2022	A. Le Coq Arena, Tallinn, Estonia	49	San Marino	2–0	2–0	2022–23 UEFA Nations League D

== Honours ==
Flora

- Meistriliiga: 2010, 2015, 2017, 2022
- Estonian Cup: 2015–16
- Estonian Supercup: 2009, 2016

Botev Plovdiv

- Bulgarian Cup: 2023–24
- Bulgarian Supercup runner-up: 2024

Estonia U17

- Under-17 Baltic Cup runner-up: 2008

Estonia U19

- Under-19 Baltic Cup runner-up: 2009, 2010, 2011

Estonia

- Baltic Cup: 2020; runner-up: 2018

Individual

- Estonian Footballer of the Year: 2022
