= Sander Puri =

Estonian footballer (born 1988)

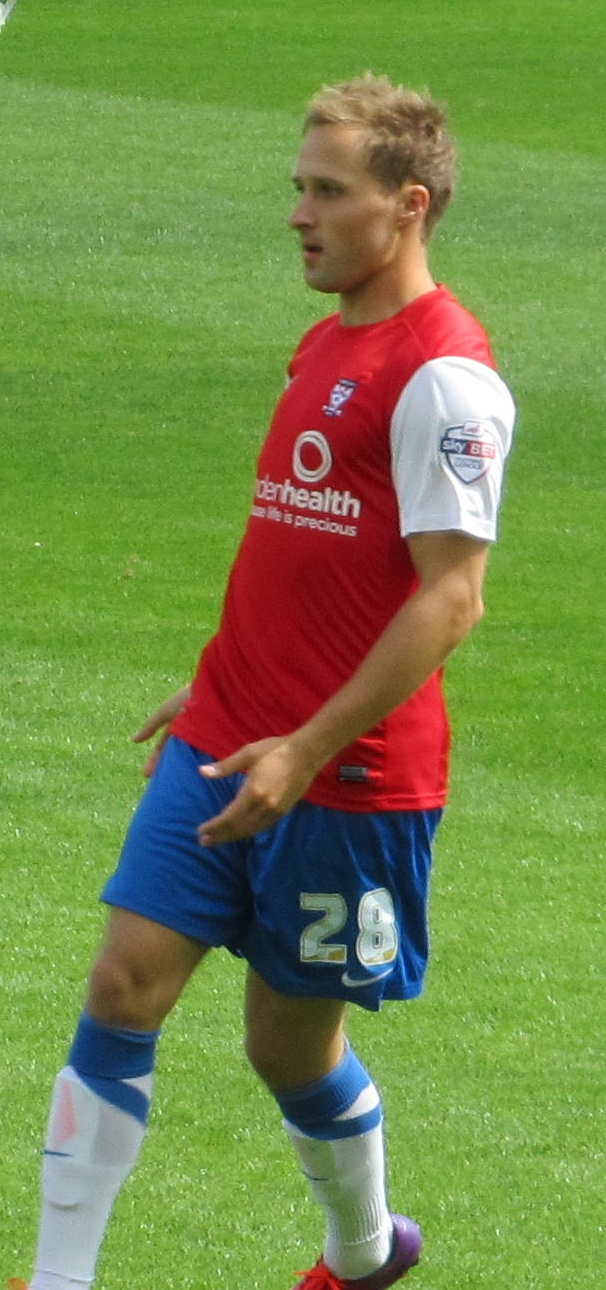
- Puri playing for York City in 2013

Personal information
- Full name: Sander Puri
- Date of birth: 7 May 1988 (age 38)
- Place of birth: Tartu, then part of Estonian SSR, Soviet Union
- Height: 1.77 m (5 ft 10 in)
- Position: Midfielder

Youth career
- –2004: Tartu SK 10

Senior career*
Years	Team	Apps	(Gls)
2004	Tartu SK 10	18	(12)
2005–2009	Levadia	73	(24)
2005–2009	Levadia U21	66	(27)
2007	→ Tulevik (loan)	14	(4)
2010–2012	Larissa	21	(1)
2011	→ Korona Kielce (loan)	8	(1)
2011–2012	→ Pápa (loan)	12	(0)
2012	KuPS	19	(2)
2013	St Mirren	3	(0)
2013–2014	York City	8	(0)
2015	Sligo Rovers	27	(4)
2016	Karviná	9	(2)
2016	Nõmme Kalju	13	(2)
2017–2018	Waterford	35	(5)
2019–2020	Nõmme Kalju	48	(9)
2021	TJK Legion	25	(2)
2022–2023	Tartu Tammeka	56	(1)

International career
2009	Estonia U21	3	(0)
2008–2023	Estonia	92	(4)
- * Club domestic league appearances and goals

Sander Puri (born 7 May 1988) is an Estonian former professional footballer who played as a midfielder. He played for the Estonia national team.

== Club career ==
=== Levadia ===
Puri was born in Tartu, Tartu County. In 2005, at the age of 16, Puri started his professional career with FCI Levadia Tallinn. He scored his first Meistriliiga goal on 1 June 2005, in a 2–0 victory over Kuressaare. On 30 July 2007, Sander and his twin brother Eino Puri joined Tulevik a half-year loan. He played 14 league matches, scoring four goals. In 2008, Puri had two trials with Bundesliga club Borussia Dortmund and in late 2009 with Scottish Premier League club Celtic.

=== Larissa ===
On 14 December 2009, Puri signed a five-year contract with Super League Greece club Larissa. On 18 March 2010, Puri scored the winning goal against PAOK, in the final moment of the match with a tap in from close range. However, in his second season, Puri's place in the team became increasingly limited which resulted him being loaned out twice. His contract was mutually terminated on 31 January 2012.

=== Loan spells with Korona Kielce and Pápa ===
In January 2011, Puri went on loan to Ekstraklasa club Korona Kielce, on a contract until the end of the season. He made his debut in a 1–1 draw against Zagłębie Lubin on 26 February 2011. Puri scored his first goal for the club in a 3–3 home draw against Polonia Bytom on 12 March 2011. However, due to injuries he only made eight appearances for the club.

In July 2011, Puri was loaned to Nemzeti Bajnokság I club Pápa. On 23 July 2011, Puri made his debut in a 2–0 home win over Siófok. On 21 September 2011, Puri scored his first goal in a 10–0 win against Győrszemere in the third round of the 2011–12 Magyar Kupa. The loan contract was mutually terminated on 19 January 2012 after spending six months at the club. At Pápa, Puri made 14 appearances, scoring one goal.

=== KuPS ===
Puri joined Veikkausliiga club KuPS on 27 March 2012 on a contract until the end of the season, after a successful trial. He made his debut after starting in a 1–0 away win over VPS in the 2012 Finnish League Cup group stage on 25 February. His first goal came in a 5–1 away win over JJK on 11 June 2012. Puri scored for KuPS in the UEFA Europa League qualifying 1–0 home win against Bursaspor. He scored the winning goal against MYPA in the semi-final of the 2012 Finnish Cup on 30 August, but received a straight red card in the final, which the team lost to Honka.

On 12 December 2012, Puri was released by the club after one season. After his release, Puri was offered a contract with A Group club Beroe Stara Zagora, but he rejected the move.

=== St Mirren ===
On 15 March 2013, Puri signed a contract until the end of 2012–13 with Scottish Premier League club St Mirren, despite the interest of divisional rivals Kilmarnock, but was not offered a contract following a trial. He made his debut on 31 March 2013 as an 88th-minute substitute in a league match against Celtic. Having made three appearances for the club, Puri was released on 15 May 2013.

=== York City ===
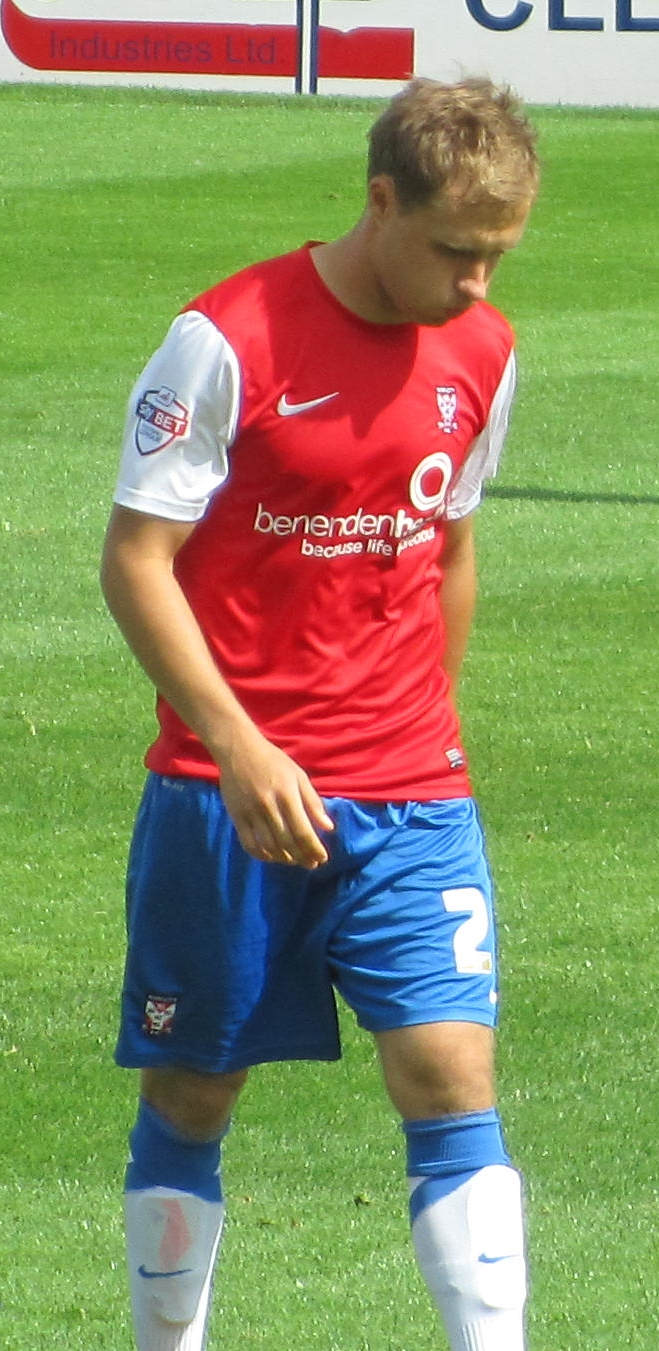
Puri playing for York City in 2013

Puri signed for League Two club York City on 13 June 2013 on a one-year contract with the option of a one-year extension. He made his debut in a 1–0 home win over Northampton Town on 3 August 2013, in the first match of 2013–14. He was released by York in May 2014.

=== Sligo Rovers ===
Puri signed for League of Ireland Premier Division club Sligo Rovers after a successful trial on 1 February 2015. On 22 May 2015, he scored his first goal in a 1–1 away draw with Derry City, after rounding the ball past goalkeeper Shaun Patton.

=== Karviná ===
Puri signed for Czech National Football League club Karviná on 18 February 2016.

=== Nõmme Kalju ===
In August 2016, Puri returned to Estonia and signed a contract with Nõmme Kalju.

=== Waterford ===
In January 2017, Puri signed for League of Ireland First Division club Waterford. He made his debut in a 1–0 defeat to Athlone Town on 24 February 2017. A lengthy injury absence prevented Puri being involved with Waterford from March to July 2017. Despite returning to training in July it was only on 18 August Puri made a return for Waterford as he appeared as an unused substitute in the teams crucial 1–0 win over UCD. The Estonian international finally made his long-awaited return for Waterford in the 1–1 draw against Shelbourne on 1 September and he nearly scored a late winner on two occasions, his first effort struck the post and then he was only inches away from tapping home from close range but his outstretched leg couldn't convert. His impressive cameo earned him a start for the game against Wexford on 15 September, he assisted Mark O'Sullivan for his second goal in that game, Waterford beat Wexford 3–0. That win coupled with Cobh Ramblers 3–0 defeat to Cabinteely crowned Waterford as league champions with two games to spare.

Puri signed a new one-year contract with Waterford for the 2018 season as the club entered the League of Ireland Premier Division. Puri scored his first goal for Waterford in their 1–0 win over Bohemians.

=== Nõmme Kalju ===
In February 2019 Puri returned to Nõmme Kalju, signing a two-year contract.

=== TJK Legion ===
On 7 February 2021, Puri signed a contract with TJK Legion. Puri made his debut for the new club in a 3–4 Loss against FCI Levadia Tallinn.

=== Tartu Tammeka ===
Puri signed for Tartu Tammeka in 2022..

=== Retirement ===
Puri announced on Instagram that he would retire at the end of the 2023 Meistriliiga season.

== International career ==
Puri was capped by Estonia at under-17, under-19 and under-21 level. He made his debut for the senior national team on 30 May 2008 against Latvia in the 2008 Baltic Cup. He scored his first national team goal on 22 November 2008, in a 1–1 draw against Lithuania in a Mayors Cup match. A goal against Saint Kitts and Nevis saw him awarded the Estonian Silverball, for the best goal scored for Estonia in 2015.

== Personal life ==
Puri is one of three triplets: his brother, Eino Puri, is also a footballer and his sister, Kadri Puri, is a volleyball player.

== Career statistics ==
=== Club ===
As of match played 16 April 2017

Appearances and goals by club, season and competition
Club	Season	League			National Cup		League Cup		Europe		Other		Total	
Club	Season	Division	Apps	Goals	Apps	Goals	Apps	Goals	Apps	Goals	Apps	Goals	Apps	Goals
Tartu SK 10	2004	IV liiga	18	12			—		—				18	12
Levadia U21	2005	Esiliiga	22	6			—		—				22	6
Levadia U21	2006	Esiliiga	29	17			—		—				29	17
Levadia U21	2007	Esiliiga	14	4			—		—				14	4
Levadia U21	2009	Esiliiga	1	0			—		—				1	0
Levadia U21	Total		66	27			—		—				66	27
Levadia	2005	Meistriliiga	13	2			—		0	0	1 (Note: Appearance in Estonian Supercup)	0	14	2
Levadia	2006	Meistriliiga	6	1			—		3 (Note: Appearances in UEFA Cup)	0	—		9	1
Levadia	2007	Meistriliiga	1	0			—		0	0	0	0	1	0
Levadia	2008	Meistriliiga	34	11			—		2 (Note: Appearances in UEFA Champions League)	0	1	1	37	12
Levadia	2009	Meistriliiga	19	10	1	0	—		5 (Note: Four appearances in UEFA Champions League, one in UEFA Europa League)	0	1	0	26	10
Levadia	Total		73	24	1	0	—		10	0	3	1	87	25
Tulevik (loan)	2007	Meistriliiga	14	4			—		—		—		14	4
Larissa	2009–10	Super League Greece	11	1	—		—		—		—		11	1
Larissa	2010–11	Super League Greece	10	0	2	0	—		—		—		12	0
Larissa	Total		21	1	2	0	—		—		—		23	1
Korona Kielce (loan)	2010–11	Ekstraklasa	8	1	—		—		—		—		8	1
Pápa (loan)	2011–12	Nemzeti Bajnokság I	12	0	2	1	—		—		—		14	1
KuPS	2012	Veikkausliiga	19	2	3	1	1	0	5 (Note: Appearances in UEFA Europa League)	1	—		28	4
St Mirren	2012–13	Scottish Premier League	3	0	—		0	0	—		—		3	0
York City	2013–14	League Two	8	0	2	0	1	0	—		0	0	11	0
Sligo Rovers	2015	League of Ireland Premier Division	27	4	2	0	1	1	—		—		30	5
Karviná	2015–16	Czech National Football League	9	2	—		—		—		—		9	2
Nõmme Kalju	2016	Meistriliiga	13	2	1	0	—		—		—		14	2
Waterford	2017	League of Ireland First Division	7	0	0	0	0	0	—		0	0	7	0
Waterford	2018	League of Ireland Premier Division	9	1	0	0	1	1	—		0	0	10	2
Waterford	Total		16	1	0	0	1	1	—		0	0	17	2
Career total			307	80	13	2	4	2	15	1	3	1	342	86

=== International ===
As of match played 8 June 2016

Appearances and goals by national team and year
National team	Year	Apps	Goals
Estonia	2008	9	1
Estonia	2009	8	1
Estonia	2010	10	0
Estonia	2011	11	0
Estonia	2012	9	0
Estonia	2013	7	1
Estonia	2014	3	0
Estonia	2015	6	1
Estonia	2016	6	0
Estonia	2018	5	0
Estonia	2019	4	0
Total		78	4

=== International goals ===
As of match played 8 June 2016
Scores and results list Estonia's goal tally first, score column indicates score after each Puri goal.

List of international goals scored by Sander Puri
No.	Date	Venue	Opponent	Score	Result	Competition
1	22 November 2008	Kuressaare Stadium, Kuressaare, Estonia	Lithuania	1–0	1–1	Friendly
2	1 April 2009	A. Le Coq Arena, Tallinn, Estonia	Armenia	1–0	1–0	2010 FIFA World Cup qualification
3	11 June 2013	A. Le Coq Arena, Tallinn, Estonia	Kyrgyzstan	1–0	1–1	Friendly
4	17 November 2015	A. Le Coq Arena, Tallinn, Estonia	Saint Kitts and Nevis	3–0	3–0	Friendly

== Honours ==
FCI Levadia Tallinn

- Meistriliiga: 2006, 2008, 2009
- Estonian Cup: 2004–05

Waterford

- League of Ireland First Division: 2017

Individual

- Estonian Silverball: 2015
