= 2008 Meistriliiga =

Estonian national championships in football

Meistriliiga
- Season: 2008
- Champions: Levadia (6th title)
- Relegated: Vaprus; TVMK
- Champions League: Levadia
- Europa League: Flora; Narva Trans; Kalju
- Matches: 180
- Goals: 639 (3.55 per match)
- Top goalscorer: Ingemar Teever (23)
- Biggest home win: TVMK 8–0 Tallinna Kalev
- Biggest away win: Tulevik 0–8 Flora
- Highest scoring: Vaprus 3–10 TVMK

The 2008 season of Meistriliiga, the first level in the Estonian football system, was the 18th season in the league's history. It began on 8 March 2008 and ended on 15 November 2008. The defending champions were Levadia.

== Promotion and relegation ==
10th placed Ajax were directly relegated after the end of the previous season. Since reserve squads are not allowed to be promoted to Meistriliiga, third placed Esiliiga team Sillamäe Kalev were directly promoted to 2008 Meistriliiga.

Kuressaare (9th placed Meistriliiga team) and Kalju (6th placed Esiliiga team) competed in promotion/relegation play-offs for one spot in 2008 Meistriliiga. The aggregate score was 2–2 and Nõmme Kalju were promoted due to scoring more away goals.

== Clubs and venues ==
Location of teams in Meistriliiga 2008

Team	Location	Stadium	Capacity	Manager
Flora	Tallinn	A. Le Coq Arena	9,300	(Finland) Pasi Rautiainen
Kalju	Tallinn	Hiiu Stadium	500	(Brazil) Getúlio Fredo
Levadia	Tallinn	Kadriorg Stadium	5,000	(Estonia) Igor Prins
Maag Tammeka	Tartu	Tartu Tamme Stadium	1,500	(Estonia) Sergei Zamogilnõi
Sillamäe Kalev	Sillamäe	Sillamäe Kalev Stadium	800	(Ukraine) Vadym Dobizha
Tallinna Kalev	Tallinn	Kalev Keskstaadion	11,500	(Estonia) Aavo Sarap
Narva Trans	Narva	Kreenholm Stadium	1,065	(Russia) Aleksei Yagudin
Tulevik	Viljandi	Viljandi linnastaadion	1,084	(Estonia) Marko Lelov
TVMK	Tallinn	Kadriorg Stadium	5,000	(Estonia) Sergei Ratnikov
Vaprus	Pärnu	Pärnu Kalev Stadium	1,900	(Estonia) Ants Kommussaar

== League table ==
Pos	Team	Pld	W	D	L	GF	GA	GD	Pts	Qualification or relegation
1	Levadia (C)	36	29	6	1	105	22	+83	93	Qualification for Champions League second qualifying round
2	Flora	36	28	7	1	113	28	+85	91	Qualification for Europa League second qualifying round (Note: Flora won the 2008–09 Estonian Cup and qualified for second qualifying round of the UEFA Europa League. Therefore, Nõmme Kalju, fourth-placed team and cup runners-up, earned a spot in the first qualifying round of the UEFA Europa League.)
3	Narva Trans	36	16	8	12	62	54	+8	56	Qualification for Europa League first qualifying round
4	Kalju	36	16	7	13	65	64	+1	55	Qualification for Europa League first qualifying round
5	Sillamäe Kalev	36	13	6	17	49	79	−30	45	
6	Tulevik	36	9	4	23	31	74	−43	31 (Note: TUL: 6 pts, 7–5; M-T: 6 pts, 5–7)	
7	Maag Tammeka	36	9	4	23	45	76	−31	31	
8	Tallinna Kalev	36	6	8	22	37	70	−33	26	
9	Vaprus (R)	36	5	2	29	41	125	−84	17	Qualification for relegation play-off
10	TVMK (Note: On 6 November 2008, the Estonian Football Association decided not to grant TVMK a license to play in Meistriliiga or Esiliiga, due to financial difficulties during the season. The Estonian Football Association allowed them to play until the end of the season and as they finished in third place, the players and coaches received bronze medals, but the club itself was dropped to 10th place. TVMK were eventually disbanded.) (R)	36	20	6	10	91	47	+44	66	Relegation to Esiliiga

Source: Estonian Football Association (in Estonian)
Rules for classification: 1) points; 2) number of wins; 3) head-to-head points; 4) head-to-head goal difference; 5) head-to-head goals scored; 6) goal difference; 7) number of goals scored.
(C) Champions; (R) Relegated

=== Relegation play-off ===
Vaprus and Esiliiga side Paide Linnameeskond competed in a two-legged relegation play-off for one spot in 2009 Meistriliiga. Aggregate score was 5–5 and Paide Linnameeskond secured their place in 2009 Meistriliiga because they scored more away goals (3–1).

20 November 2008
13:00 EET

Paide Linnameeskond	2–1	Vaprus
Polyansky 22' (o.g.); Ellram 67'	Report (in Estonian)	Kovalenko 90'

Paide Ühisgümnaasiumi stadium
Attendance: 150
Referee: Ainar Kuusk

23 November 2008
12:00 EET

Vaprus	4–3	Paide Linnameeskond
Joost 48'; Pakk 70', 75'; Polyansky 72'	Report (in Estonian)	Saar 13'; Voolaid 43'; Ellram 65'

Pärnu Kalevi Stadium
Attendance: 100
Referee: Jaan Roos

== Results ==
Each team played every opponent four times, twice at home and twice on the road, for a total of 36 games.

=== First half of season ===
Home \ Away	FLO	NÕM	LEV	M-T	SIL	T.K	NAR	TUL	TVM	VPR
Flora		1–1	0–2	3–1	4–0	4–1	3–3	3–1	3–1	7–0
Nõmme Kalju	1–7		0–4	2–1	3–0	2–1	1–1	2–0	1–5	3–1
Levadia	2–2	2–2		1–1	4–0	3–1	3–1	2–0	2–0	7–0
Maag Tammeka	1–3	2–1	1–3		2–0	0–2	0–1	2–0	1–2	4–1
Sillamäe Kalev	0–3	2–1	0–5	1–1		2–1	1–3	1–0	1–3	1–4
Tallinna Kalev	0–3	2–0	0–2	2–0	2–5		1–2	2–1	1–1	1–2
Narva Trans	1–2	1–0	0–3	1–1	3–1	0–0		4–1	1–1	1–0
Tulevik	0–8	0–0	0–1	3–1	1–1	3–2	1–0		0–3	0–1
TVMK	0–0	0–1	3–0	1–0	5–1	5–2	1–1	6–1		2–1
Vaprus	1–6	0–2	0–4	2–4	1–3	2–0	0–6	2–4	1–5	

Source: Matchday 1–9 results Matchday 10–18 results (in Estonian)
Legend: Blue = home team win; Yellow = draw; Red = away team win.

=== Second half of season ===
Home \ Away	FLO	NÕM	LEV	M-T	SIL	T.K	NAR	TUL	TVM	VPR
Flora		4–0	0–0	6–2	7–1	1–1	2–1	4–1	4–2	3–0
Nõmme Kalju	0–3		1–2	2–1	2–2	3–2	7–3	2–0	2–0	5–1
Levadia	0–0	1–0		4–1	5–1	2–1	7–2	5–0	1–1	4–0
Maag Tammeka	1–2	2–3	1–3		0–2	1–0	1–4	2–1	2–3	1–0
Sillamäe Kalev	0–1	2–1	1–4	2–1		2–1	4–4	0–1	0–1	3–2
Tallinna Kalev	0–1	2–3	1–5	1–1	0–0		2–0	1–2	2–2	1–1
Narva Trans	0–2	1–1	0–1	4–1	0–3	1–0		3–0	1–0	3–0
Tulevik	1–2	1–4	0–5	3–0	0–0	0–0	1–0		0–1	1–2
TVMK	1–3	2–1	1–2	6–2	1–2	8–0	0–1	2–1		6–2
Vaprus	1–6	5–5	0–4	1–2	2–4	0–1	2–4	0–2	3–10	

Source: Matchday 19–27 results Matchday 28–36 results (in Estonian)
Legend: Blue = home team win; Yellow = draw; Red = away team win.

== Season statistics ==
=== Top scorers ===
Rank	Player	Club	Goals
1	(Estonia) Ingemar Teever	Kalju	23
2	(Russia) Nikita Andreev	Levadia	22
3	(Estonia) Sander Post	Flora	19
4	(Estonia) Jarmo Ahjupera	Flora	17
4	(Brazil) Felipe Nunes	Kalju	17
6	(Estonia) Tarmo Kink	Levadia	16
7	(Estonia) Henri Anier	Flora	15
7	(Estonia) Indrek Zelinski	Levadia	15
9	(Ukraine) Irfan Ametov	Sillamäe Kalev	13
9	(Estonia) Artjom Dmitrijev	TVMK	13
9	(Estonia) Vladislav Gussev	TVMK	13
9	(Estonia) Nikolai Lõsanov	Narva Trans	13

== Awards ==
=== Monthly awards ===
Month	Manager of the Month		Player of the Month	
Month	Manager	Club	Player	Club
March	(Brazil) Getúlio Fredo	Kalju	(Estonia) Sander Post	Flora
April	(Estonia) Igor Prins	Levadia	(Estonia) Ingemar Teever	Kalju
May	(Finland) Pasi Rautiainen	Flora	(Estonia) Konstantin Nahk	Levadia
June	(Estonia) Igor Prins	Levadia	(Estonia) Vjatšeslav Zahovaiko	Flora
July	(Finland) Pasi Rautiainen	Flora	(Estonia) Mihhail Starodubtsev	Sillamäe Kalev
August	(Estonia) Igor Prins	Levadia	(Finland) Juha Hakola	Flora
September	(Ukraine) Vadym Dobizha	Sillamäe Kalev	(Estonia) Tarmo Kink	Levadia
October	(Russia) Aleksei Yagudin	Narva Trans	(Estonia) Marek Lemsalu	Levadia

== Attendances ==
No.	Club	Average
1	Kalju	329
2	Levadia	289
3	Tammeka	220
4	Flora	214
5	Pärnu	166
6	Kalev	152
7	TVMK	131
8	Sillamäe	115
9	Tulevik	112
10	Trans	110

== See also ==
- 2008 Esiliiga
