= 2010 Meistriliiga =

Estonian national championships in football

Meistriliiga
- Season: 2010
- Champions: Flora (8th title)
- Relegated: Lootus
- Champions League: Flora
- Europa League: Levadia; Narva Trans; Kalju
- Matches played: 180
- Goals scored: 576 (3.2 per match)
- Top goalscorer: Sander Post (24 goals)
- Biggest home win: Levadia 6–0 Paide Linnameeskond (23 March); Flora 6–0 Kuressaare (17 July); Levadia 6–0 Tammeka (6 November)
- Biggest away win: Lootus 0–8 Flora (15 September)
- Highest scoring: Paide Linnameeskond 1–8 Sillamäe Kalev (10 July); Flora 6–3 Tammeka (31 July)
- Longest winning run: Flora (11 games) (31 July–25 September)
- Longest unbeaten run: Flora (24 games) (10 April–25 September)
- Longest winless run: Paide Linnameeskond (15 games) (13 March–12 June)
- Longest losing run: Kuressaare (11 games) (5 June–21 August)

The 2010 season of the Meistriliiga, the first level in the Estonian football system, was the 20th season in the league's history. It started in March and ended in November. The defending champions were Levadia.

== Overview ==
Location of the Meistriliiga 2010 teams

Club	Location	Stadium	Capacity	Manager
Flora	Tallinn	A. Le Coq Arena	9,692	(Estonia) Martin Reim
Kalju	Tallinn	Hiiu Stadium	500	(Estonia) Igor Prins
Kuressaare	Kuressaare	Kuressaare linnastaadion	2,000	(Estonia) Sergei Zamogilnõi
Levadia	Tallinn	Maarjamäe Stadium	500	(Estonia) Aleksandr Puštov
Lootus	Kohtla-Järve	Kohtla-Järve Sports Centre Stadium	500	(Estonia) Andrei Škaleta
Paide Linnameeskond	Paide	ÜG Stadium	500	(Estonia) Meelis Rooba
Sillamäe Kalev	Sillamäe	Sillamäe Kalev Stadium	2,000	(Russia) Vladimir Kazachyonok
Tammeka	Tartu	Tartu Tamme Stadium	2,000	(Estonia) Marko Kristal
Narva Trans	Narva	Kreenholm Stadium	3,000	(Estonia) Valeri Bondarenko
Tulevik	Viljandi	Viljandi linnastaadion	2,500	(Estonia) Marko Lelov

== League table ==
Pos	Team	Pld	W	D	L	GF	GA	GD	Pts	Qualification or relegation
1	Flora (C)	36	29	4	3	104	32	+72	91	Qualification for Champions League second qualifying round
2	Levadia	36	26	8	2	100	16	+84	86	Qualification for Europa League second qualifying round
3	Narva Trans	36	23	7	6	67	31	+36	76	Qualification for Europa League first qualifying round (Note: Champions-League qualified Flora won the cup against Trans, so Levadia will qualify for the second qualifying round. Trans and Kalju took the first qualifying round spots.)
4	Kalju	36	18	8	10	59	42	+17	62	Qualification for Europa League first qualifying round
5	Sillamäe Kalev	36	18	5	13	79	52	+27	59	
6	Tammeka	36	11	7	18	50	66	−16	40	
7	Tulevik	36	8	5	23	33	62	−29	29	
8	Paide Linnameeskond	36	6	7	23	30	79	−49	25	
9	Kuressaare	36	7	3	26	32	93	−61	24	Qualification for relegation play-offs
10	Lootus (R)	36	6	2	28	22	103	−81	20	Relegated to Esiliiga

Source: Estonian Football Association (in Estonian)
Rules for classification: 1st points; 2nd least withdrawals or annulled matches; 3rd overall wins; 4th head-to-head points; 5th head-to-head goal difference; 6th goal difference; 7th goals scored.
If two or more teams on the top have the same number of points by the end of the season, the aforementioned rules will not apply and additional game(s) will be played to determine the champions.
(C) Champions; (R) Relegated

=== Relegation play-off ===
The 9th placed team of Meistriliiga, Kuressaare, and the fourth place team of Esiliiga, Kiviõli Tamme Auto competed in a two-legged relegation play-off for one spot in 2011 Meistriliiga. Kuressaare won the play-off 4–2 on aggregate and retained their spot in the league.

14 November 2010
12:00 CET

Kiviõli Tamme Auto	2–1	Kuressaare
Šteinberg 60'; Kirilov 79'		Aljas 15'

Kiviõli Stadium, Kiviõli
Attendance: 70

20 November 2010
12:00 CET

Kuressaare	3–0	Kiviõli Tamme Auto
Skiperski 27'; Viira 31'; Pukk 36'

Kuressaare linnastaadion, Kuressaare

== Results ==
Each team played every opponent four times, twice at home and twice on the road, for a total of 36 games.

=== First half of season ===
Home \ Away	FLO	KAL	KUR	LEV	LOT	PAI	SIL	TAM	NAR	TUL
Flora		1–0	4–0	2–1	2–1	2–1	4–2	3–2	1–1	1–1
Kalju	1–2		2–1	0–3	1–0	1–1	2–1	1–1	0–1	1–0
Kuressaare	1–2	1–2		0–7	1–2	1–0	0–4	2–3	0–1	3–2
Levadia	2–1	0–0	1–1		5–1	6–0	3–1	2–0	3–0	2–0
Lootus	0–4	0–5	5–2	0–3		2–1	0–1	1–3	0–5	0–1
Paide	0–2	0–3	1–2	0–4	1–0		0–1	1–3	0–4	2–0
Sillamäe Kalev	1–2	2–2	0–0 (Note: The match was awarded as won for Kuressaare, with no goals being counted, because Sillamäe Kalev used an ineligible player. The original result was 6–0.)	1–1	3–1	4–0		4–0	1–2	2–1
Tammeka	0–1	2–3	2–0	0–0	1–0	0–0	1–4		1–2	2–0
Narva Trans	1–0	2–2	3–0	1–2	0–1	4–1	2–2	0–0		2–0
Tulevik	0–1	1–4	0–0	0–1	1–0	1–0	1–2	0–3	0–1	

Source: Estonian Football Association
Legend: Blue = home team win; Yellow = draw; Red = away team win.

=== Second half of season ===
Home \ Away	FLO	KAL	KUR	LEV	LOT	PAI	SIL	TAM	NAR	TUL
Flora		3–0	6–0	2–0	5–0	6–2	3–0	6–3	4–0	1–0
Kalju	3–3		1–0	1–5	2–0	0–0	0–2	3–1	0–2	3–0
Kuressaare	0–2	1–5		0–4	0–1	2–3	2–2	3–2	1–4	4–2
Levadia	2–2	1–1	4–0		5–0	4–0	2–0	6–0	1–1	3–0
Lootus	0–8	0–6	2–0	0–5		1–2	0–5	1–3	0–4	0–0
Paide	1–4	0–1	3–0	1–4	1–1		1–8	3–4	1–1	1–1
Sillamäe Kalev	2–5	4–1	2–0	0–4	4–0	0–0		2–0	1–3	5–2
Tammeka	2–1	0–1	0–2	0–0	5–1	1–2	2–3		0–1	2–2
Narva Trans	1–2	1–0	5–1	0–3	4–1	0–0 (Note: The match was awarded as won for Trans, with no goals being counted, because Paide LM used an ineligible player. The original result was 0–0.)	2–1	1–1		2–0
Tulevik	1–6	0–1	4–1	0–1	4–0	1–0	3–2	4–0	0–3	

Source: Estonian Football Association
Legend: Blue = home team win; Yellow = draw; Red = away team win.

== Season Statistic ==
=== Miscellaneous ===
- Oldest player: 45 years, 117 days – Aleksei Zhukov (Lootus v Kuressaare on 08/05/2010)
- Youngest player: 16 years, 66 days – Alexei Cherkasov (Sillamäe Kalev v Trans on 06/11/2010)
- Oldest goalscorer: 38 years, 207 days – Aleksei Naumov (Sillamäe Kalev v Flora on 28 August 2010)
- Youngest goalscorer: 16 years, 216 days – Andreas Raudsepp (JK Viljandi Tulevik v Trans on 06/11/2010)

== Season statistics ==
=== Top scorers ===
Rank	Player	Club	Goals
1	(Estonia) Sander Post	Flora	24
2	(Estonia) Jüri Jevdokimov	Kalju	21
3	(Estonia) Tarmo Neemelo	Kalju	20
4	(Estonia) Vitali Leitan	Levadia	16
5	(Estonia) Deniss Malov	Levadia	14
6	(Estonia) Henri Anier	Flora	13
6	(Lithuania) Marius Bezykornovas	Narva Trans	13
8	(Estonia) Konstantin Nahk	Levadia	12
8	(Estonia) Albert Prosa	Tammeka	12
10	(Estonia) Maksim Gruznov	Sillamäe Kalev/Narva Trans	9
10	(Russia) Nikita Kolyaev	Sillamäe Kalev	9
10	(Russia) Aleksandr Nikulin	Sillamäe Kalev	9
10	(Brazil) Felipe Nunes	Kalju/Levadia	9
10	(Russia) Dmitri Skiperski	Kuressaare	9
10	(Lithuania) Nerijus Vasiliauskas	Sillamäe Kalev	9

=== Average attendance ===
Club	Average attendance
Tallinna FC Levadia	291
Tallinna FC Flora	203
Nõmme JK Kalju	194
JK Sillamäe Kalev	183
Tartu JK Tammeka	156
Paide Linnameeskond	130
JK Narva Trans	128
Kohtla-Järve FC Lootus	124
FC Kuressaare	116
Viljandi JK Tulevik	83
League average	161

== Awards ==
=== Monthly awards ===
Month	Manager of the Month		Player of the Month	
Month	Manager	Club	Player	Club
March	(Estonia) Martin Reim	Flora	(Estonia) Tarmo Neemelo	Levadia
April	(Estonia) Marko Kristal	Tammeka	(Estonia) Andrei Kalimullin	Levadia
May	(Estonia) Martin Reim	Flora	(Russia) Maksim Bazyukin	Narva Trans
June	(Estonia) Karel Voolaid	Kalju	(Estonia) Vitali Leitan	Levadia
July	(Estonia) Meelis Rooba	Paide Linnameeskond	(Estonia) Sander Post	Flora
August	(Estonia) Martin Reim	Flora	(Estonia) Aleksandr Tarassenkov	Sillamäe Kalev

=== Meistriliiga Player of the Year ===
Sander Post was named Meistriliiga Player of the Year.

== See also ==
- 2010 Esiliiga
- 2009–10 Estonian Cup
