= Maido Pakk =

Estonian footballer

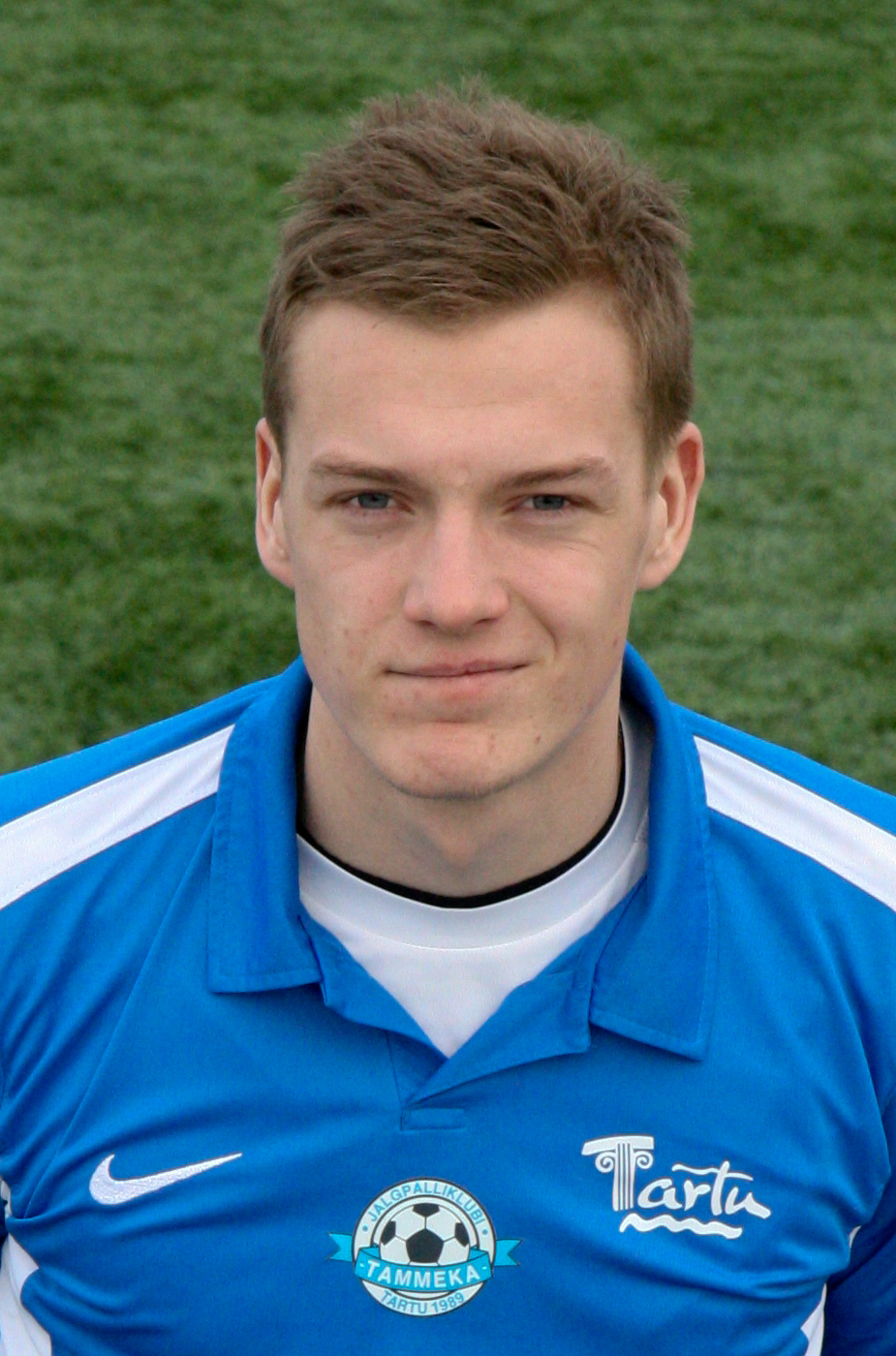

Personal information
- Date of birth: 23 November 1989 (age 36)
- Place of birth: Pärnu, then part of Estonian SSR, Soviet Union
- Position: Forward

Youth career
- 2002–2007: Pärnu JK
- 2007: Pärnu Pataljoni JK

Senior career*
| Years | Team | Apps | (Gls) |
| 2008–2009 | Pärnu JK Vaprus | 44 | (11) |
| 2008 | → Pärnu JK Vaprus II | 3 | (1) |
| 2009 | AC Kajaani | | |
| 2009–2010 | FC Haka | 1 | (0) |
| 2010 | Valkeakosken Koskenpojat | | |
| 2010 | SJK (trial) | | |
| 2010 | FC PoPa | 2 | |
| 2012–2013 | Tartu JK Tammeka | 18 | (1) |
| 2014–2018 | Balestrand IL | 32 | (21) |
- * Club domestic league appearances and goals

Maido Pakk (born 23 November 1989) is an Estonian footballer who is last known to have played for Balestrand Idrettslag in Norway from 2014 to 2018.

== Career ==
=== Pärnu ===
Playing for Pärnu JK in his youth career, he moved to Pärnu JK Vaprus in 2008. He debuted for the main team on 8 March 2008.

He was banned for two games for representing Pärnu JK Vaprus for the 2008-09 Estonian Cup third round even though he was already suspended, also causing Pärnu to be disqualified and admonished.

=== Finland ===
Examined by Haka in 2009, Pakk boosted AC Kajaani to gain some experience, eventually moving to Haka that September, and debuted in a 0–1 collapse to FF Jaro and hurt his knees that November which left him out for some months. Assessed by SJK in summer 2010, the Estonian instead turned to Porin Palloilijat where he debuted as PoPa mustered a goal over JIPPO in the Ykkönen.

=== Tammeka ===
Pakk joined Tartu JK Tammeka in 2012. He left the club in 2013 due to a knee injury.
