= Nikita Kolyayev =

Russian footballer (born 1989)

Nikita Kolyayev Никита Коляев
Personal information
- Full name: Nikita Vladimirovich Kolyayev
- Date of birth: 23 July 1989 (age 37)
- Place of birth: Alma-Ata, Kazakh SSR
- Height: 1.80 m (5 ft 11 in)
- Positions: Midfielder; forward

Senior career*
Years	Team	Apps	(Gls)
2010	Kalev Sillamäe	17	(9)
2011	Levadia Tallinn	16	(6)
2011–2013	Maccabi Ironi Bat Yam	8	(0)
2013	Levadia Tallinn	13	(4)
2014–2015	Dnepr Smolensk	24	(6)
2015–2016	Ocean Kerch	11	(7)
2016	TSK Simferopol	13	(8)
2016	Naftan Novopolotsk	11	(1)
2017	Ocean Kerch		
2017	Ryazan	12	(2)
2018	Jelgava	6	(3)
- * Club domestic league appearances and goals

Nikita Vladimirovich Kolyayev (Russian: Никита Владимирович Коляев; born 23 July 1989) is a Russian former football player.

== Club career ==
He made his debut in the Russian Professional Football League for FC Dnepr Smolensk on 4 September 2014 in a game against FC Znamya Truda Orekhovo-Zuyevo.
