= Aleksandr Nikulin (footballer, born 1985) =

Russian footballer

Personal information
- Full name: Aleksandr Yevgenyevich Nikulin
- Date of birth: 19 January 1985 (age 41)
- Height: 1.81 m (5 ft 11 1/2 in)
- Position: Forward

Senior career*
Years	Team	Apps	(Gls)
2002–2004	FC Zenit-2 St. Petersburg	77	(23)
2005	FC Lokomotiv St. Petersburg (amateur)		
2005	FC Petrotrest St. Petersburg	15	(1)
2006–2008	FC Zimbru Chişinău	12	(1)
2009	FC Smena-Zenit St. Petersburg	8	(3)
2010–2011	JK Sillamäe Kalev	48	(15)
2014	Jõhvi FC Lokomotiv	13	(6)
- * Club domestic league appearances and goals

Aleksandr Yevgenyevich Nikulin (Russian: Александр Евгеньевич Никулин; born 19 January 1985) is a former Russian professional football player.

== Club career ==
He made his Russian Football National League debut for FC Petrotrest St. Petersburg on 26 July 2005 in a game against FC Khimki.
