= Vadym Dobizha =

Ukrainian football coach and player (1941–2023)

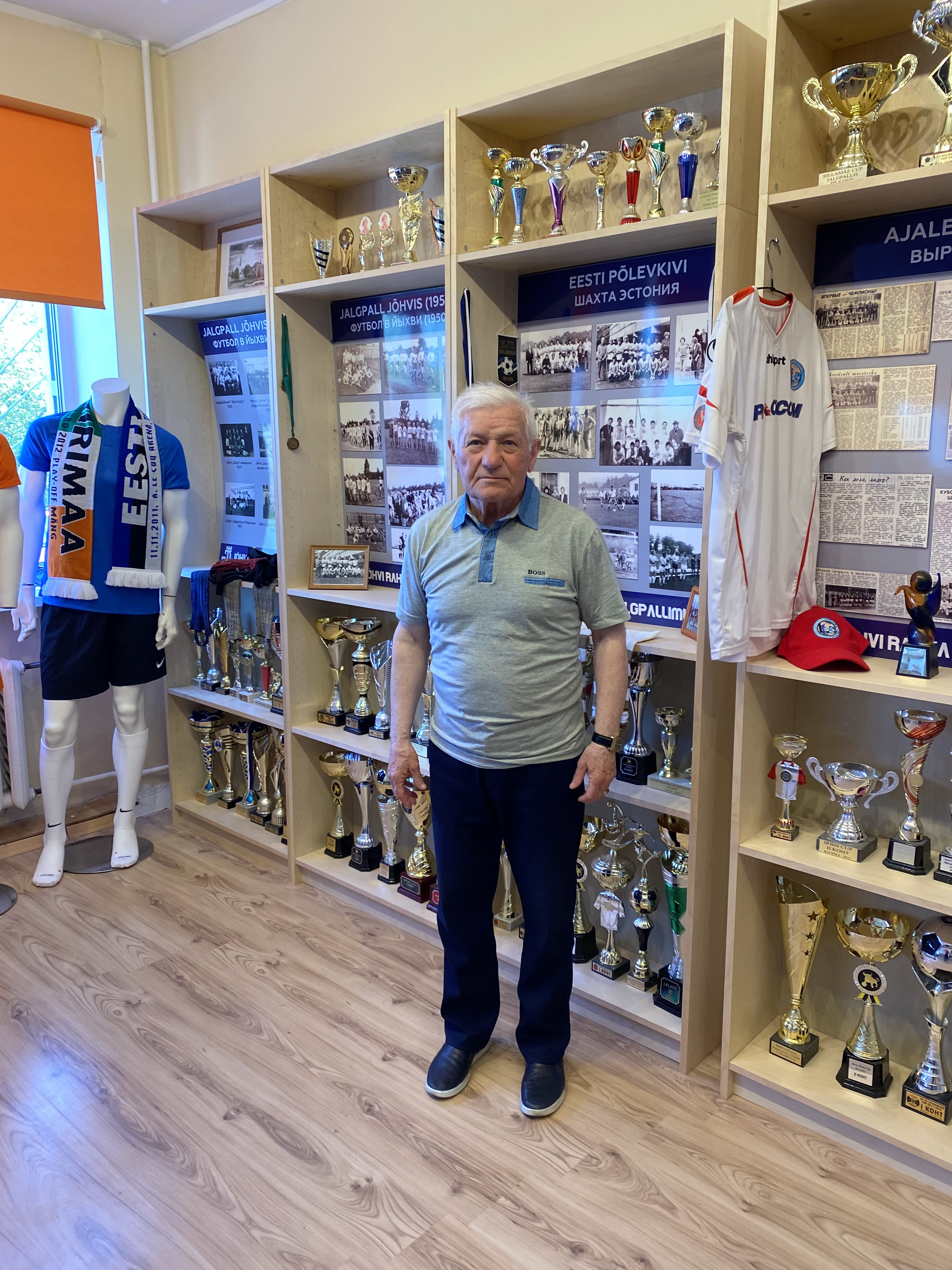

Personal information
- Full name: Vadym Dmytrovych Dobizha
- Date of birth: 26 February 1941
- Place of birth: Spat, Simferopol Raion, Russian SFSR, USSR
- Date of death: 29 January 2023 (aged 81)
- Place of death: Sillamäe, Estonia

Youth career
- Trud Voroshylovhrad
- Trudovi Rezervy Luhansk

Senior career*
Years	Team	Apps	(Gls)
- Admiralteyets Leningrad
- SKA Leningrad
- Dynamo Leningrad

Managerial career
- 1968–1970: Zorya Voroshylovhrad (youth)
- 1970–1971: Vahonobudivnyk Stakhanov (assistant)
- 1971: Khimik Sieverodonetsk (assistant)
- 1972–1979: Ukrainian SSR (assistant)
- 1980–1981: Zorya Voroshylovhrad
- 1986–1988: Zorya Voroshylovhrad
- 1991–1992: Khimik Sieverodonetsk
- 1997: Zorya-2 Luhansk
- 1998–2000: Zorya Luhansk
- 2000–2001: Zorya Luhansk (assistant)
- 2002: Volga Tver
- 2006–2009: Sillamäe Kalev
- 2010–2014: Sillamäe Kalev (reserves)
- 2010: Kohtla-Järve FC Lootus
- 2014: Sillamäe Kalev
- 2017: Sillamäe Kalev
- * Club domestic league appearances and goals

Vadym Dmytrovych Dobizha (Ukrainian: Вадим Дмитрович Добіжа; 26 February 1941 – 29 January 2023) was a Ukrainian football coach and player. He managed Sillamäe Kalev among other clubs.

Born in the Crimean ASSR in family of military pilot just before the Nazi invasion of the Soviet Union, during the war soon after his father's death, with his mother he moved to Luhansk.

Dobizha died in Sillamäe, Estonia on 29 January 2023, at the age of 81.
