= Murilo Maccari =

Brazilian footballer

Personal information
- Full name: Murilo Maccari
- Date of birth: September 21, 1987 (age 39)
- Place of birth: Tubarão, Santa Catarina, Brazil
- Height: 1.80 m (5 ft 11 in)
- Position: Left midfielder

Team information
- Current team: Naxxar Lions
- Number: 16

Youth career
- 2000–2001: Internacional
- 2002–2005: Figueirense

Senior career*
Years	Team	Apps	(Gls)
2005–2007	Reggina	1	(0)
2006–2007	→ NK Domžale (loan)	18	(0)
2007–2008	Figueirense	3	(2)
2009	Nõmme Kalju	21	(3)
2010	Vittoriosa Stars	15	(3)
2011–	Naxxar Lions	25	(2)
- * Club domestic league appearances and goals as of 1 August 2011

Murilo Maccari (born 21 September 1987) is a Brazilian professional footballer, who plays for Naxxar Lions F.C. in Malta.

== Position ==
He plays the position of midfielder.

== Career ==
His former clubs include Sport Club Internacional, Figueirense Futebol Clube, Reggina Calcio, NK Domžale and Vittoriosa Stars F.C.. Murilo also holds an Italian passport.

== Honours ==
=== Club ===
- JK Nõmme Kalju
  - Estonian Cup
    - Runners Up: 2008–09
