= Felipe Nunes =

Brazilian footballer (born 1990)

Personal information
- Full name: Felipe Mundim Nunes
- Date of birth: 20 May 1990 (age 36)
- Place of birth: Gama, DF, Brazil
- Height: 1.75 m (5 ft 9 in)
- Position: Attacking midfielder

Team information
- Current team: Pattani
- Number: 10

Youth career
- CFZ-DF
- –2010: Independente

Senior career*
Years	Team	Apps	(Gls)
2011	Independente	0	(0)
2012–2015	Grêmio	0	(0)
2013	→ Figueirense (loan)	0	(0)
2014	→ Portuguesa (loan)	9	(0)
2015	→ Capivariano (loan)	4	(0)
2016	Botafogo-SP	0	(0)
2016	Bragantino	3	(0)
2017	Passo Fundo	3	(0)
2017	Anápolis	3	(0)
2017–2019	Shukura	26	(3)
2019	Jeddah		
2020–2023	Songkhla	55	(6)
2023–	Pattani	22	(3)
- * Club domestic league appearances and goals as of 1 May 2024

Felipe Mundim Nunes (born 20 May 1990) is a Brazilian professional footballer who plays as an attacking midfielder for Pattani.

== Club career ==
Born in Gama, Distrito Federal, Nunes only made his senior debuts in the São Paulo state, playing for lowly Independente de Limeira. After being an important midfield unit for the side which was promoted in 2011, he joined Grêmio on 20 November 2011.

Initially assigned to the youth side, Nunes made his first-team debut on 2 February 2012, coming on as a late substitute in a 1–0 home win against São Luiz for the Campeonato Gaúcho championship. He only appeared in three further more matches in that year, all from the bench.

On 3 January 2013 Nunes joined Figueirense on loan. However, he returned to Grêmio in May, after being released from Figueira.

After not featuring during the rest of 2013, Nunes moved to Portuguesa in a season-long loan on 17 January 2014. He returned to Grêmio in June, after appearing sparingly with Lusa, but eventually "re-appeared" for the latter in September.

== Honours ==
=== Club ===
Songkhla

- Thai League 3 Southern Region: 2020–21, 2022–23
