= JK Sillamäe Kalev =

Estonian football club

Sillamäe Kalev
- Full name: Jalgpalliklubi Sillamäe Kalev
- Founded: 1957; 68 years ago
- Ground: Sillamäe Kalev Stadium
- Capacity: 800
- Chairman: Aleksandr Starodubtsev
- Manager: Vadym Dobizha
- League: II liiga (north/east)
- 2022: II liiga, 10th
- Website: http://fcsillamae.ee
Home colours	Away colours

JK Sillamäe Kalev, commonly known as Sillamäe Kalev, or simply as Sillamäe, is an Estonian football club based in Sillamäe. Founded in 1957, Sillamäe Kalev was one of the founding members of the Meistriliiga.

The club competed in the Meistriliiga, the top flight of Estonian football in 2017, but was declared bankrupt in March 2018. Its football academy continued and took over the name, continuing in the II liiga, 4th level in the Estonian football league system.

== History ==
Sillamäe Kalev was founded in 1957 and competed in the Estonian SSR Football Championship. In 1992, the club became one of the founding members of the Meistriliiga. Sillamäe Kalev was relegated after the 1993–94 season.

After a lengthy spell in lower divisions, the club returned to the Meistriliiga for the 2008 season. Sillamäe Kalev finished the 2009 season as runners-up with 76 points behind Levadia and qualified to the 2010–11 UEFA Europa League qualifiers. Sillamäe Kalev faced off Dinamo Minsk in the second qualifying round, losing 1–10 on aggregate. Sillamäe Kalev returned to top three in the 2013 season, when the club placed third. The club finished the 2014 season as runners-up, while Yevgeni Kabaev won the goal scoring title with 36 goals. Sillamäe Kalev reached the 2015–16 Estonian Cup final, but suffered an extra time loss to Flora.

== Crest ==
–2015

2015–present

== Honours ==
=== Domestic ===
- Meistriliiga

Runners-up (2): 2009, 2014
Third place (1): 2013

- Esiliiga

Third place (1): 2007

- Estonian Cup

Runners-up (1): 2015–16

== Players ==
=== First-team squad ===
As of 18 July 2017

Note: Flags indicate national team as defined under FIFA eligibility rules; some limited exceptions apply. Players may hold more than one non-FIFA nationality.

No.	Pos.	Nation	Player
1	GK	(Estonia) EST	Mihhail Starodubtsev (captain)
3	DF	(Estonia) EST	Dmitri Kovtunovitš
4	DF	(Estonia) EST	Aleksandr Ivanjušin
5	DF	(Russia) RUS	Aleksei Yepifanov
7	MF	(Estonia) EST	Denis Vnukov
9	FW	(Russia) RUS	Aleksandr Savin
10	MF	(Estonia) EST	Aleksandr Volkov
13	MF	(Russia) RUS	Irakli Torinava

No.	Pos.	Nation	Player
15	DF	(Russia) RUS	Mikhail Slashchev
16	GK	(Estonia) EST	Eduard Orehov
21	FW	(Russia) RUS	Roman Grigorevski
23	DF	(Estonia) EST	Pavel Aleksejev
26	DF	(Estonia) EST	Vladislav Tšurilkin
33	DF	(Estonia) EST	Artjom Davõdov
77	DF	(Ukraine) UKR	Oleksandr Sukharov
95	FW	(Estonia) EST	Erik Anohhin

== Personnel ==
=== Managerial history ===
Dates	Name
2006–2009	(Ukraine) Vadym Dobizha
2009	(Russia) Anatoli Ushanov
2010–2011	(Russia) Vladimir Kazachyonok
2011–2012	(Estonia) Valeri Bondarenko
2012–2013	(Lithuania) Algimantas Briaunys
2013–2014	(Estonia) Sergei Ratnikov
2014	(Lithuania) Algimantas Briaunys (Ukraine) Vadym Dobizha
2014–2015	(Russia) Sergei Frantsev
2015–2016	(Russia) Denis Ugarov
2016–2017	(Lithuania) Algimantas Briaunys
2017–	(Ukraine) Vadym Dobizha

== Statistics ==
=== League and Cup ===
Season	Division	Pos	Pld	W	D	L	GF	GA	GD	Pts	Top goalscorer	Cup
1992	Meistriliiga	5	6	1	1	4	4	10	−6	3		
1992	Relegation	11	5	2	2	1	8	8	0	6		
1992–93	Meistriliiga	11	22	4	1	17	17	65	−48	9		
1993–94	Meistriliiga	11	22	1	1	20	11	97	−86	3		Third round
1994–95	II liiga	1	8	5	1	2	19	13	+6	16		
1994–95	Promotion	3	8	4	1	3	13	11	+2	13		
1995–96	II liiga	2	8	4	3	1	14	6	+8	11		
1995–96	Promotion	2	12	8	1	3	30	10	+20	25		
1996–97	Esiliiga	4	14	7	2	5	21	13	+8	23		
1996–97	Promotion	6	10	1	3	6	6	21	−15	6		
1997–98	Esiliiga	6	14	4	2	8	21	33	−12	14		Third round
1997–98	Relegation	4	14	5	4	5	20	17	+3	19		Third round
1998	Esiliiga	5	14	5	3	6	15	23	−8	18		
1999	Esiliiga	8	28	5	2	21	26	62	−36	17		
2000	II liiga	1	20	11	7	2	39	15	+24	40		
2001	Esiliiga	7	28	12	3	13	59	53	+6	39	(Estonia) Aleksandr Ivarinen (9)	
2002	Esiliiga	8	28	3	3	22	23	79	−56	12		Second round
2003	II liiga	8	28	5	3	20	45	98	−53	18		Second round
2004	III liiga	1	18	14	2	2	58	16	+42	44	(Estonia) Roman Treial (19)	
2005	II liiga	6	28	13	2	13	58	66	−8	41	(Russia) Aleksandr Avdeev (21)	
2006	II liiga	2	28	17	6	5	106	50	+56	57	(Russia) Aleksandr Avdeev (34)	
2007	Esiliiga	3	36	20	9	7	67	40	+27	69	(Estonia) Vitali Bolšakov (14)	
2008	Meistriliiga	5	36	13	6	17	49	79	−30	45	(Ukraine) Irfan Ametov (13)	Second round
2009	Meistriliiga	2	36	24	4	8	85	40	+45	76	(Russia) Aleksei Naumov (13)	Semi-finalist
2010	Meistriliiga	5	36	18	5	13	79	52	+27	59	(Russia) Nikita Kolyaev (Russia) Aleksandr Nikulin (Lithuania) Nerijus Vasiliauskas (9)	Quarter-finalist
2011	Meistriliiga	5	36	17	3	16	77	59	+18	54	(Russia) Aleksei Alekseev (Russia) Aleksandr Nikulin (14)	Semi-finalist
2012	Meistriliiga	5	36	15	10	11	51	43	+8	55	(Russia) Vladislav Ivanov (10)	Fourth round
2013	Meistriliiga	3	36	23	6	7	75	22	+53	75	(France) Kassim Aidara (17)	Quarter-finalist
2014	Meistriliiga	2	36	25	4	7	108	34	+74	79	(Russia) Yevgeni Kabaev (36)	Second round
2015	Meistriliiga	5	36	17	8	11	63	43	+20	59	(Ukraine) Yaroslav Kvasov (19)	Quarter-finalist
2016	Meistriliiga	5	36	14	9	13	65	55	+10	51	(Russia) Yevgeni Kabaev (25)	Finalist
2017	Meistriliiga	10	36	10	6	20	52	76	-24	36	(Estonia) Aleksandr Volkov (18)	Third round

=== Europe ===
Season	Competition	Round	Opponent	Home	Away	Agg.
2010–11	UEFA Europa League	Second qualifying round	(Belarus) Dinamo Minsk	0–5	1–5	1–10
2014–15	UEFA Europa League	First qualifying round	(Finland) Honka	2–1	2–3 (a.e.t.)	4–4 (a)
2014–15	UEFA Europa League	Second qualifying round	(Russia) Krasnodar	0–4	0–5	0–9
2015–16	UEFA Europa League	First qualifying round	(Croatia) Hajduk Split	1–1	2–6	3–7
