= Anatoli Ushanov =

Russian footballer and coach

Personal information
- Full name: Anatoli Ivanovich Ushanov
- Date of birth: 2 January 1950
- Date of death: 30 September 2017 (aged 67)
- Place of death: Saint Petersburg, Russia
- Position: Goalkeeper

Senior career*
| Years | Team | Apps | (Gls) |
| 1975 | Khimik Grodno | 22 | (0) |
| 1976 | Traktor Minsk | | |

Managerial career
- 1996–1997: Sport Saint Petersburg
- 1999–2002: Torpedo-MAZ Minsk (assistant)
- 2003: Dynamo Saint Petersburg (assistant)
- 2003–2004: Priozersk
- 2005–2007: Petrotrest Saint Petersburg (assistant)
- 2009: Sillamäe Kalev
- 2010–2012: Sillamäe Kalev (assistant)
- 2013–2014: Zvezda Saint Petersburg (gk coach)
- * Club domestic league appearances and goals

Anatoli Ivanovich Ushanov (Russian: Анатолий Иванович Ушанов; born 2 January 1950 – 30 September 2017) was a Russian football coach and a former player.

== Coaching career ==
He worked as a coach in FC Dinamo Leningrad, FC Dinamo Sankt-Peterburg, FC Petrotrest Saint Petersburg, FC Torpedo-MAZ Minsk and JK Sillamäe Kalev (head coach) in 2009. 2010–2011 he was the assistant coach of the JK Sillamäe Kalev.
