= 2007 Esiliiga =

Estonian football league season for second division

Esiliiga
- Season: 2007

The 2007 Esiliiga is the 17th season of the Esiliiga, second-highest Estonian league for association football clubs, since its establishment in 1992.

JK Sillamäe Kalev gained automatic promotion to the Meistriliiga as FC Levadia II are the reserve team for Meistriliiga champions FC Levadia and therefore can not be promoted to the same league as its parent club. JK Nõmme Kalju also go up after winning the promotion-relegation play-off. The league's top-scorer was Andrus Mitt from JK Nõmme Kalju with 24 goals.

== Final table of Esiliiga season 2007 ==
Pos	Team	Pld	W	D	L	GF	GA	GD	Pts	Promotion or relegation
1	Levadia II Tallinn (Note: Reserve teams are ineligible for promotion.) (C)	36	27	5	4	95	20	+75	86	
2	Flora II Tallinn	36	24	6	6	97	33	+64	78	
3	Kalev Sillamäe (P)	36	20	9	7	67	40	+27	69	Promotion to Meistriliiga
4	TVMK II Tallinn	36	15	8	13	81	68	+13	53	
5	Maag Tammeka II Tartu	36	14	11	11	51	39	+12	53	
6	Kalju Nõmme (P)	36	13	9	14	69	69	0	48	Qualification for promotion play-offs
7	Warrior Valga	36	13	5	18	72	73	−1	44	
8	Tulevik II Viljandi (R)	36	9	7	20	37	84	−47	34	Qualification for relegation play-offs
9	Välk 494 Tartu (R)	36	7	8	21	49	93	−44	29	Relegation to II liiga
10	FC Elva (R)	36	3	2	31	17	116	−99	11	Relegation to II liiga

(C) Champions; (P) Promoted; (R) Relegated

== Season statistics ==
=== Top goalscorers ===
As of 11 November 2007.

Rank	Player	Club	Goals
1	(Estonia) Andrus Mitt	Nõmme Kalju	24
2	(Estonia) Artjom Dmitrijev	TVMK II	18
3	(Estonia) Sergei Jegorov	TVMK II	17
4	(Russia) Aleksandr Pavlikhin	Levadia II	16
5	(Estonia) Vitali Bolšakov	Sillamäe Kalev	14
5	(Estonia) Alo Dupikov	Flora II	14
7	(Estonia) Henri Anier	Warrior	13
8	(Estonia) Rasmus Luhakooder	Tulevik II	11
8	(Estonia) Janar Toomet	Warrior	11
10	(Estonia) Jevgeni Gurtšioglujants	Levadia II	10
10	(Estonia) Andrei Kostin	Sillamäe Kalev	10

== See also ==
- 2007 Meistriliiga
