= Hiiu Stadium =

Stadium in Tallinn, Estonia

Hiiu staadion
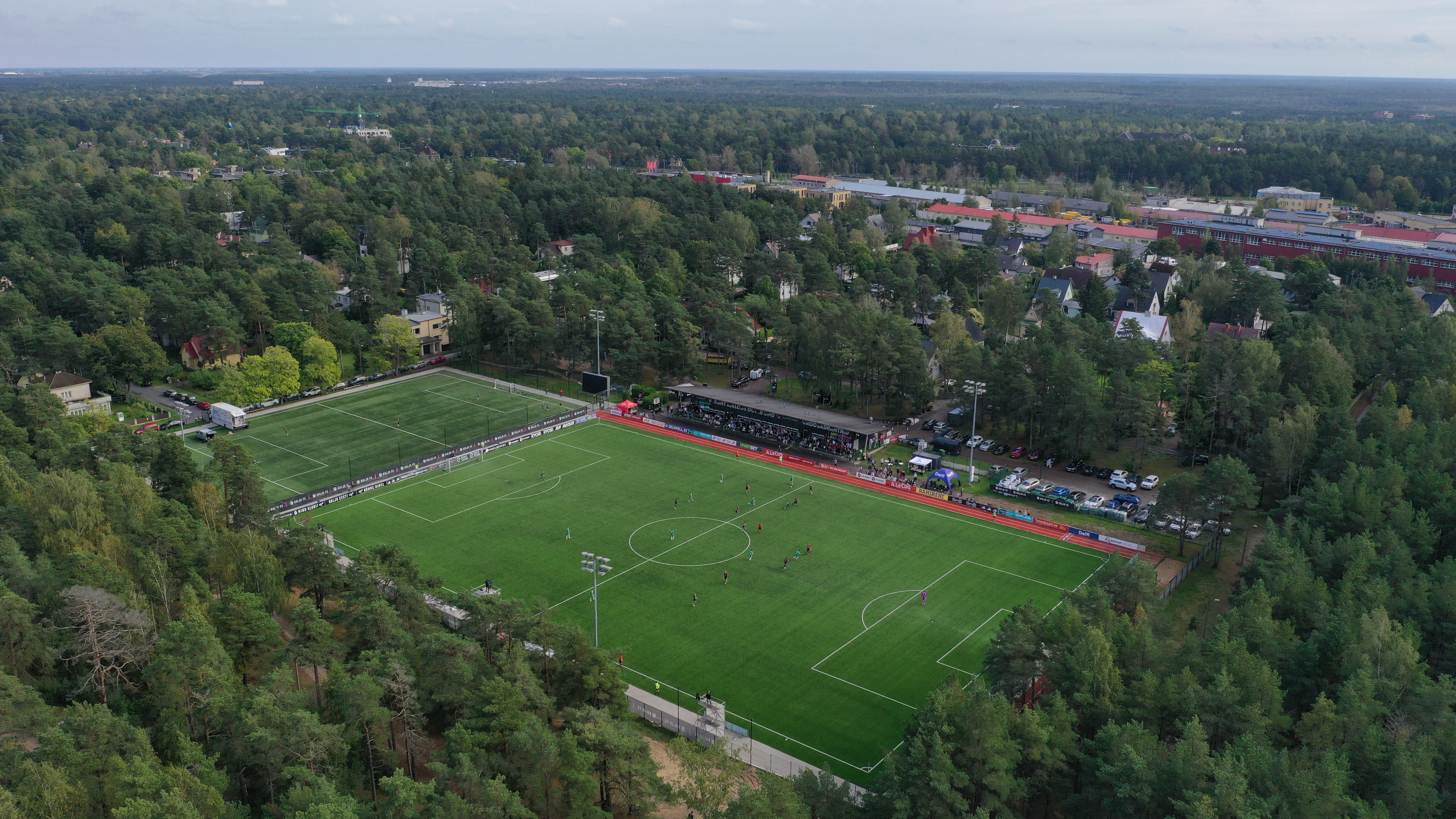
- Interactive map of Hiiu staadion
- Location: Hiiu, Nõmme, Tallinn, Estonia
- Coordinates: 59°23′7.64″N 24°39′34.57″E
- Owner: City of Tallinn
- Operator: Nõmme Kalju FC
- Capacity: 570
- Surface: Artificial turf
- Record attendance: 2,730 (Nõmme Kalju vs FC Flora, 10 September 2011)
- Field size: 105 × 68 m

Construction
- Opened: 1936; 90 years ago
- Renovated: 2002, 2006, 2013, 2023–2024

Tenant
- Nõmme Kalju FC (1936–1944, 1997–2011, 2015–2020, 2024–present)

Hiiu Stadium (Estonian: Hiiu staadion) is a football stadium in Tallinn, Estonia. Opened in 1936, it is the home ground of Nõmme Kalju FC. The stadium is located about 8 km southwest of the city centre, in the district of Nõmme. The address of the stadium is Pidu tänav 11, Tallinn.

Hiiu Stadium has been Nõmme Kalju's home since its opening in 1936 until the club's dissolution in 1944 due to Soviet occupation of Estonia, and again since the club's re-establishment in 1997. The stadium has undergone several renovation periods, most recently in 2023–2024.

On 10 September 2011, the highest recorded attendance was set, when 2,730 people watched a football match between hosts Nõmme Kalju and FC Flora Tallinn.

== History ==
=== Early years ===
The construction of the Hiiu Stadium began in 1930, after Nõmme Kalju, who had previously been playing on a field between Tähe and Rahu streets (where today lies the Nõmme Tennis Center), were in a need for a larger sports ground. The construction was initiated by Kalju's chairman Hugo Sepp and was carried out largely by the footballers themselves. The stadium was opened in 1936.

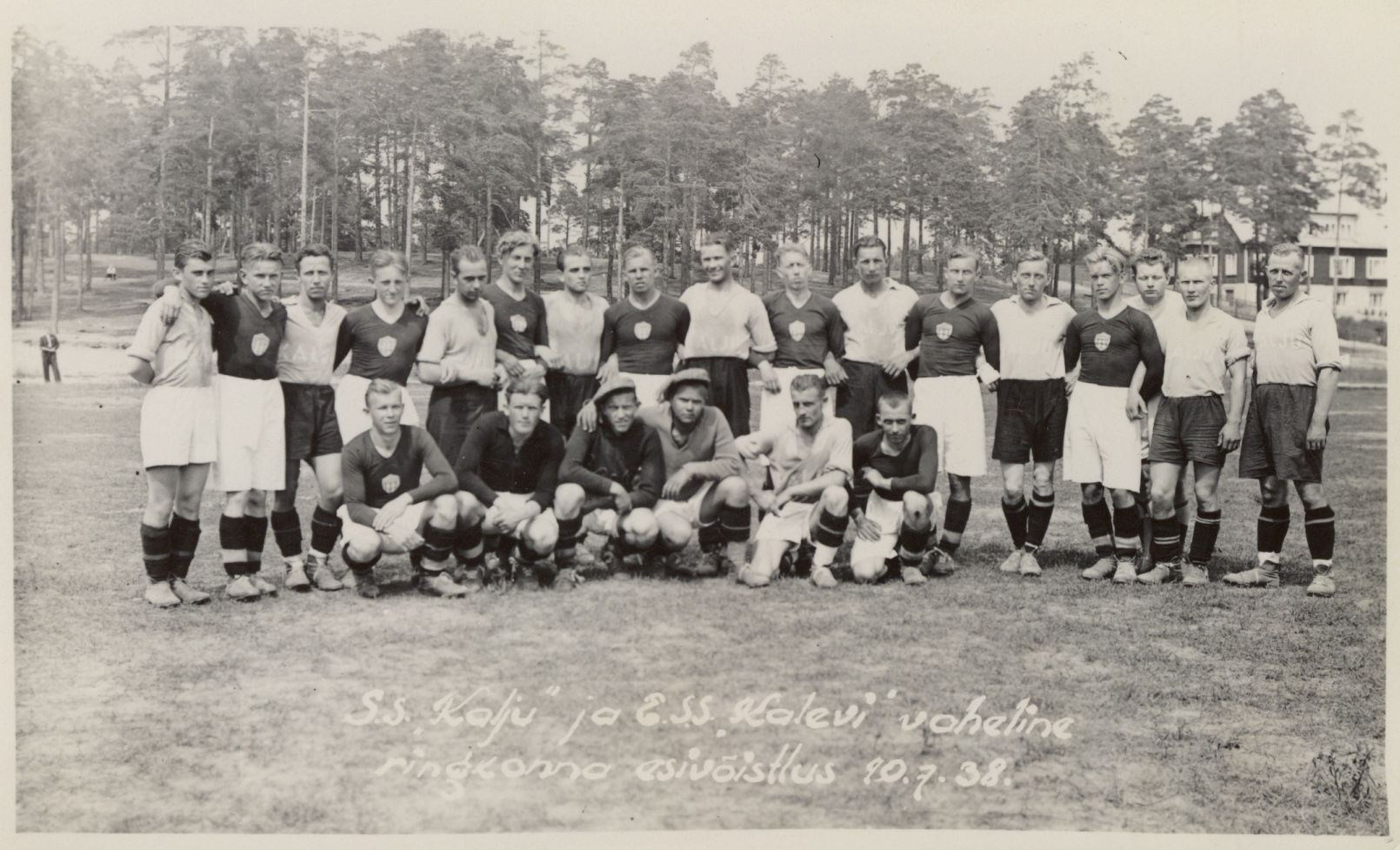
Nõmme Kalju and Tallinna Kalev footballers posing together at Hiiu Stadium, 1938

=== Hiiu Stadium after the re-establishment of Nõmme Kalju ===
After Estonia regained its independence in 1991, Nõmme Kalju was re-established and the club moved back to Hiiu Stadium.

The stadium was completely renovated in 2002 and cost 8 million Estonian kroon. In 2006, the old artificial turf was replaced by a 3rd generation turf and an administration building with a stand for 300 people was erected.

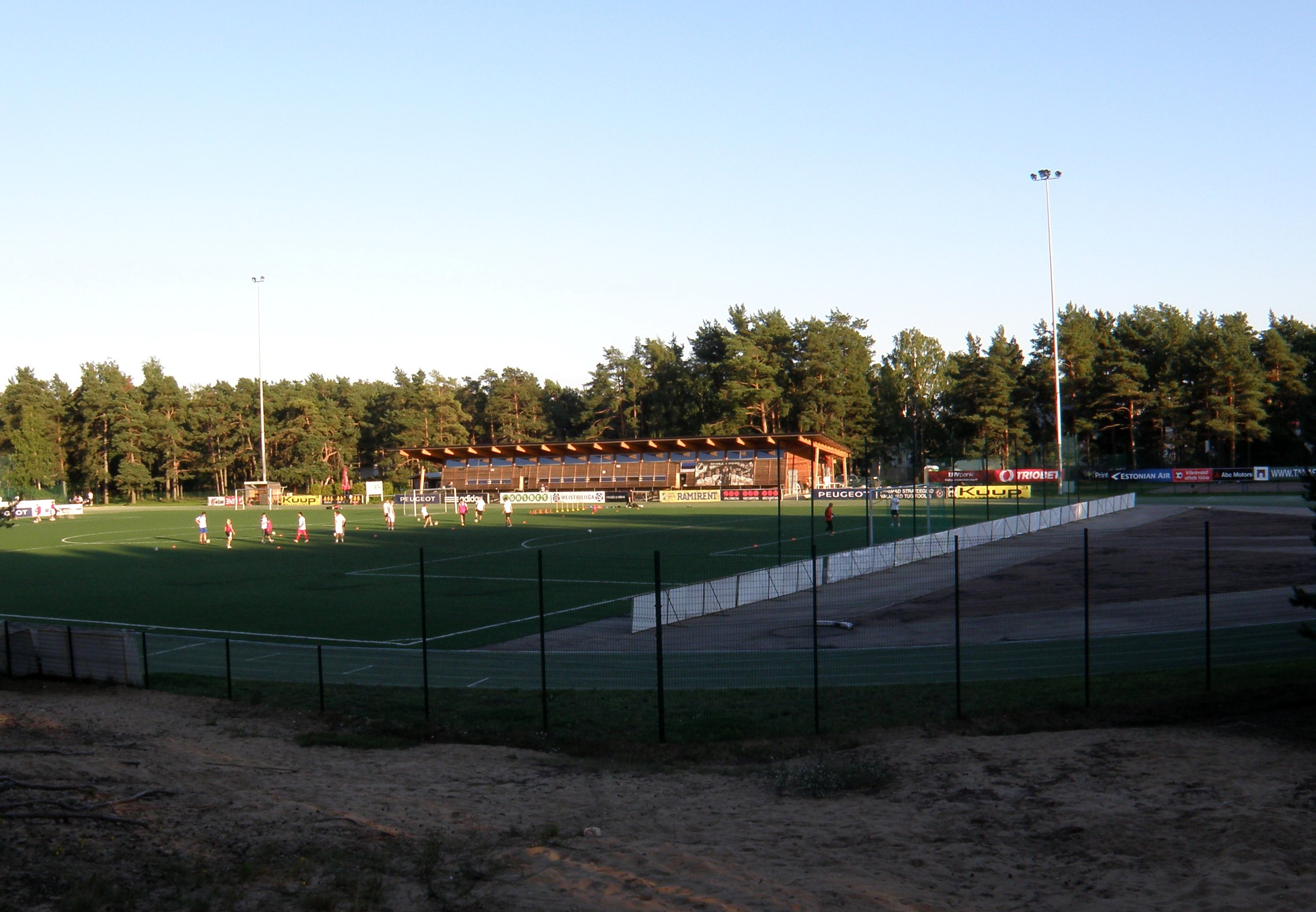
Hiiu Stadium in 2011

Nõmme Kalju were promoted to Meistriliiga for the 2008 season. On 10 September 2011, the highest recorded attendance was set, when 2,730 people watched a football match between hosts Nõmme Kalju and FC Flora Tallinn. After four seasons of top-flight football at Hiiu Stadium, the club moved to Kadriorg Stadium in 2012, but returned to Hiiu again in 2015 after it had undergone another renovation.

==== 2023–2024 renovation ====
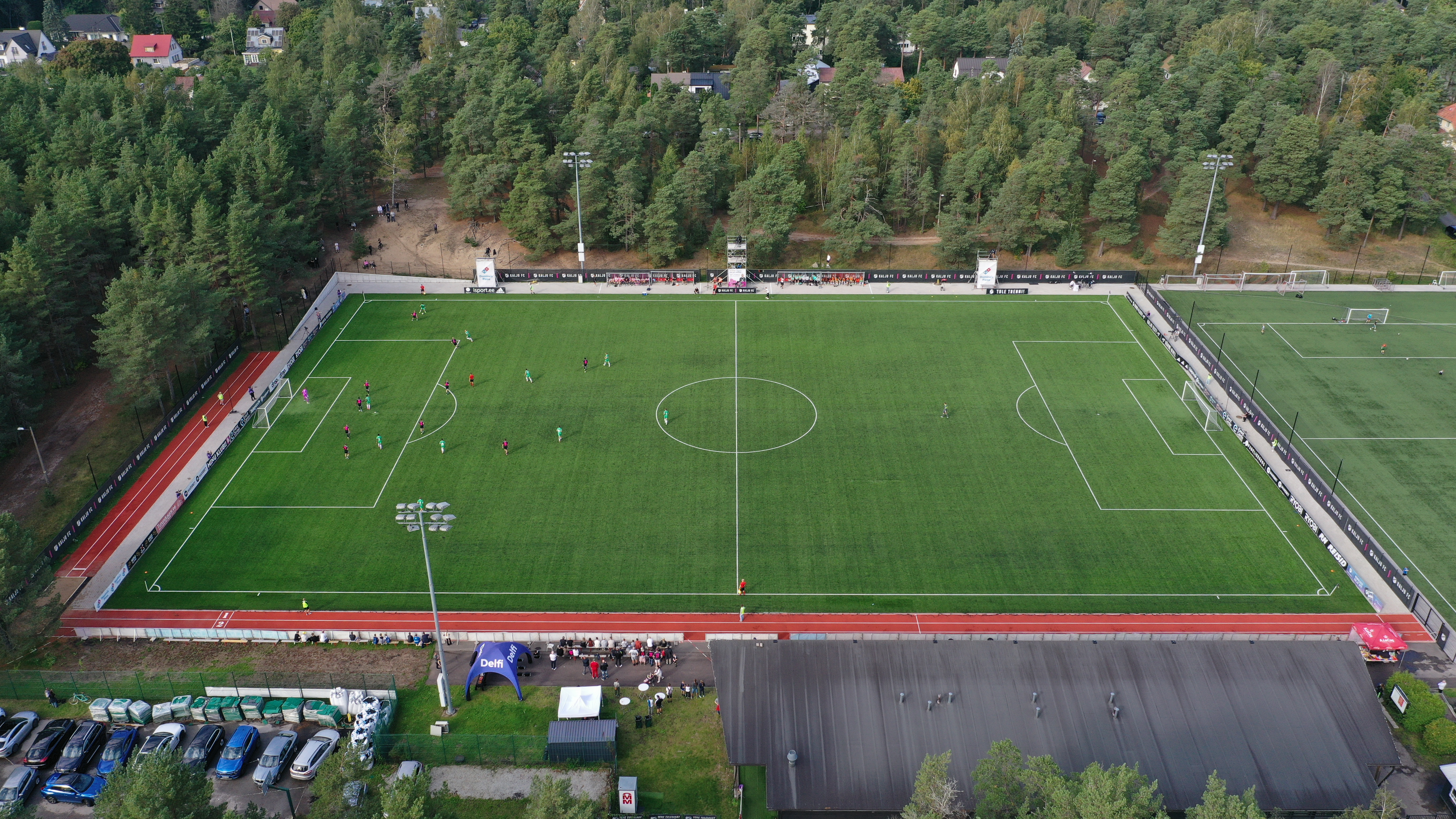
The stadium after the 2023–2024 renovation

Nõmme Kalju were again forced to move away from Hiiu after the 2020 season, as the stadium's artificial turf was declared unfit to host top-flight football. The renovation works were supposed to start in 2021, but the project was delayed nearly three years for numerous reasons. The construction began in the autumn of 2023, during which the location of the main ground was moved towards west in order to construct an additional 75 × 45 m training field on the side of Pidu tänav street. This resulted in the removal of the 400 m running track, which caused resentment among Nõmme's athletics community. Kalju returned to Hiiu Stadium in May 2024.

The second stage of the renovation project involves the construction of a new administrative building and a 1,500-seat grandstand. It is set to be financed by the owner of the stadium, the City of Tallinn, who have not given a clear completion date for the project.

== Gallery ==
Hiiu Stadium with the 400-metre running track in 2017

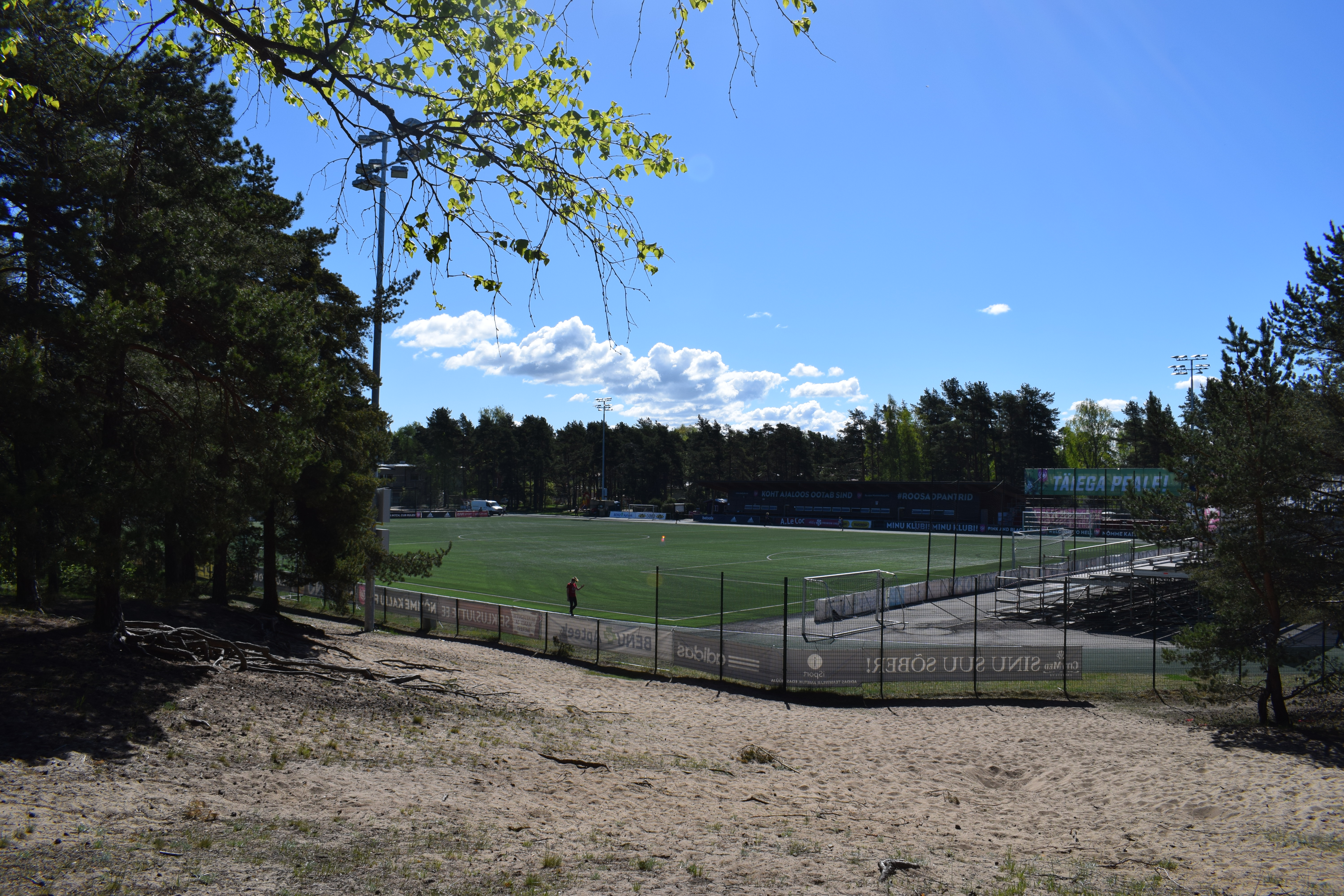

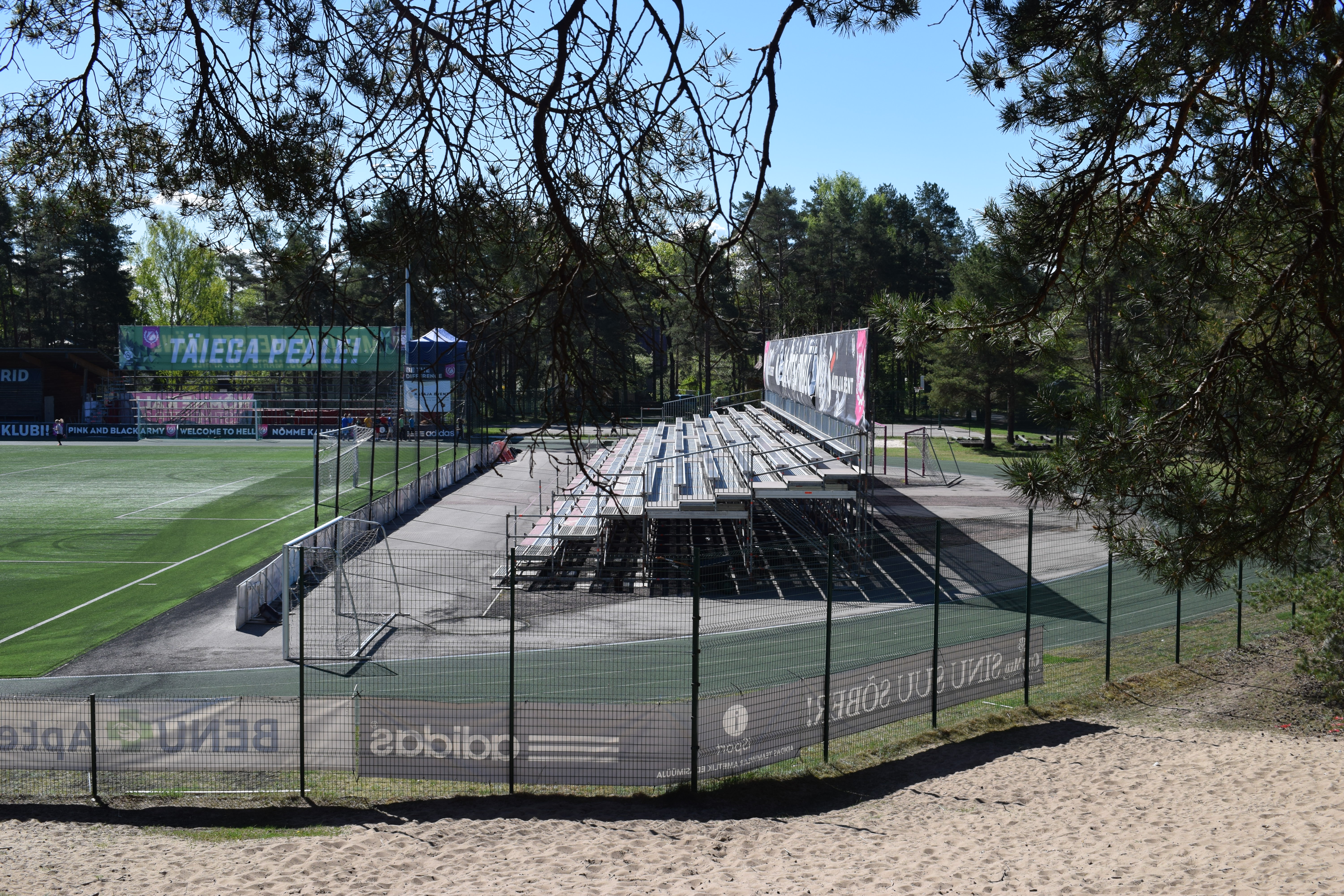

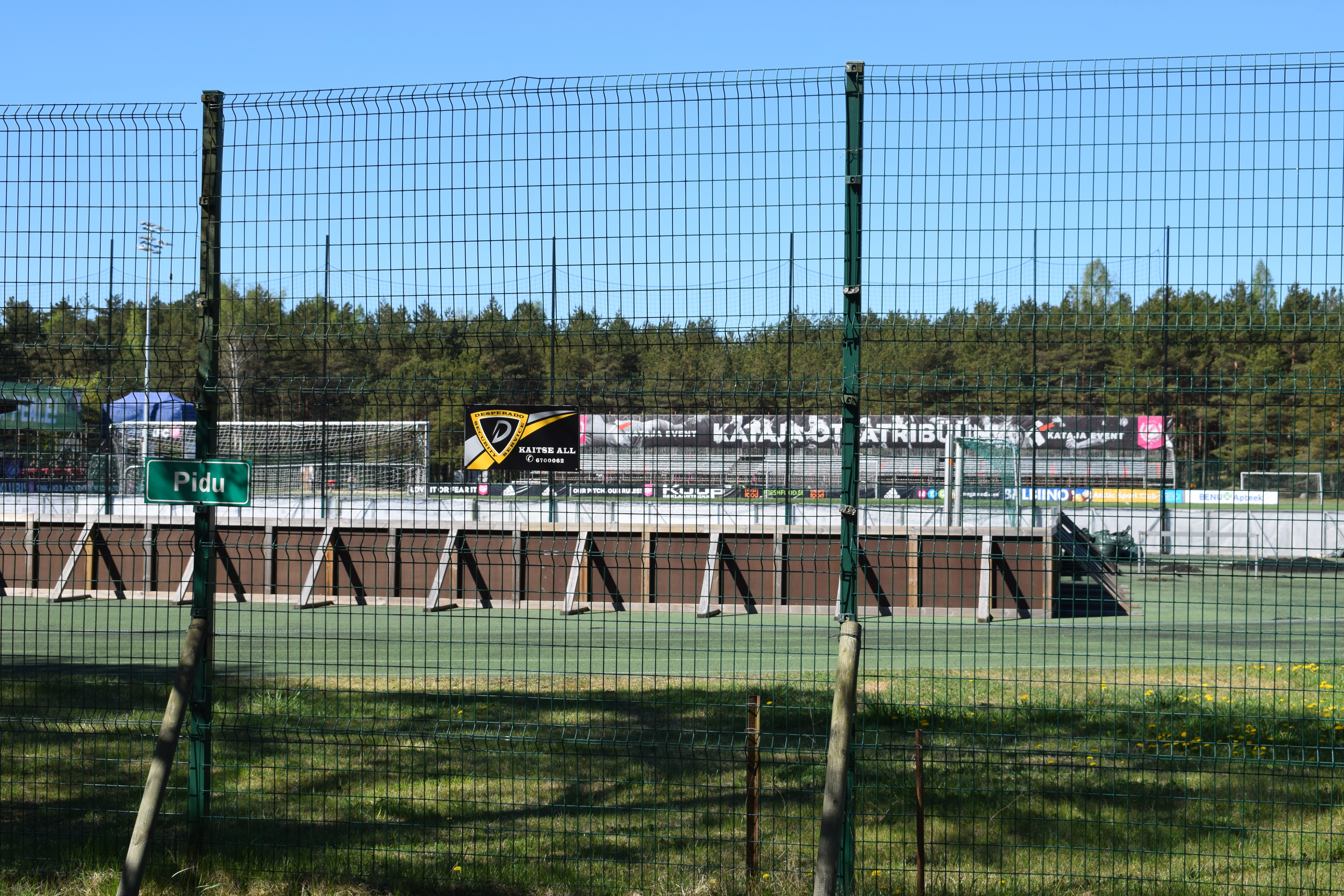

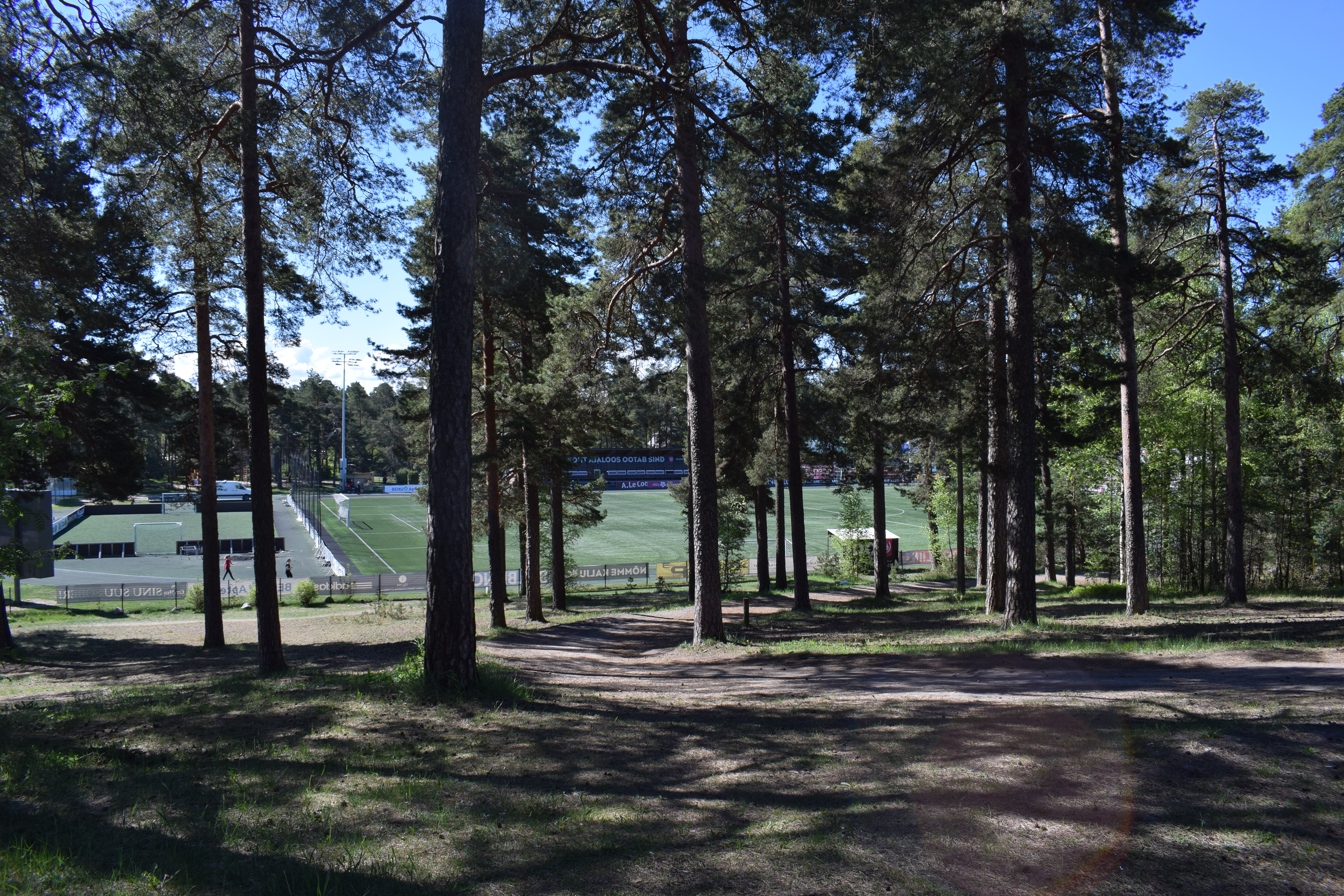
