= Getúlio Fredo =

Brazilian football manager

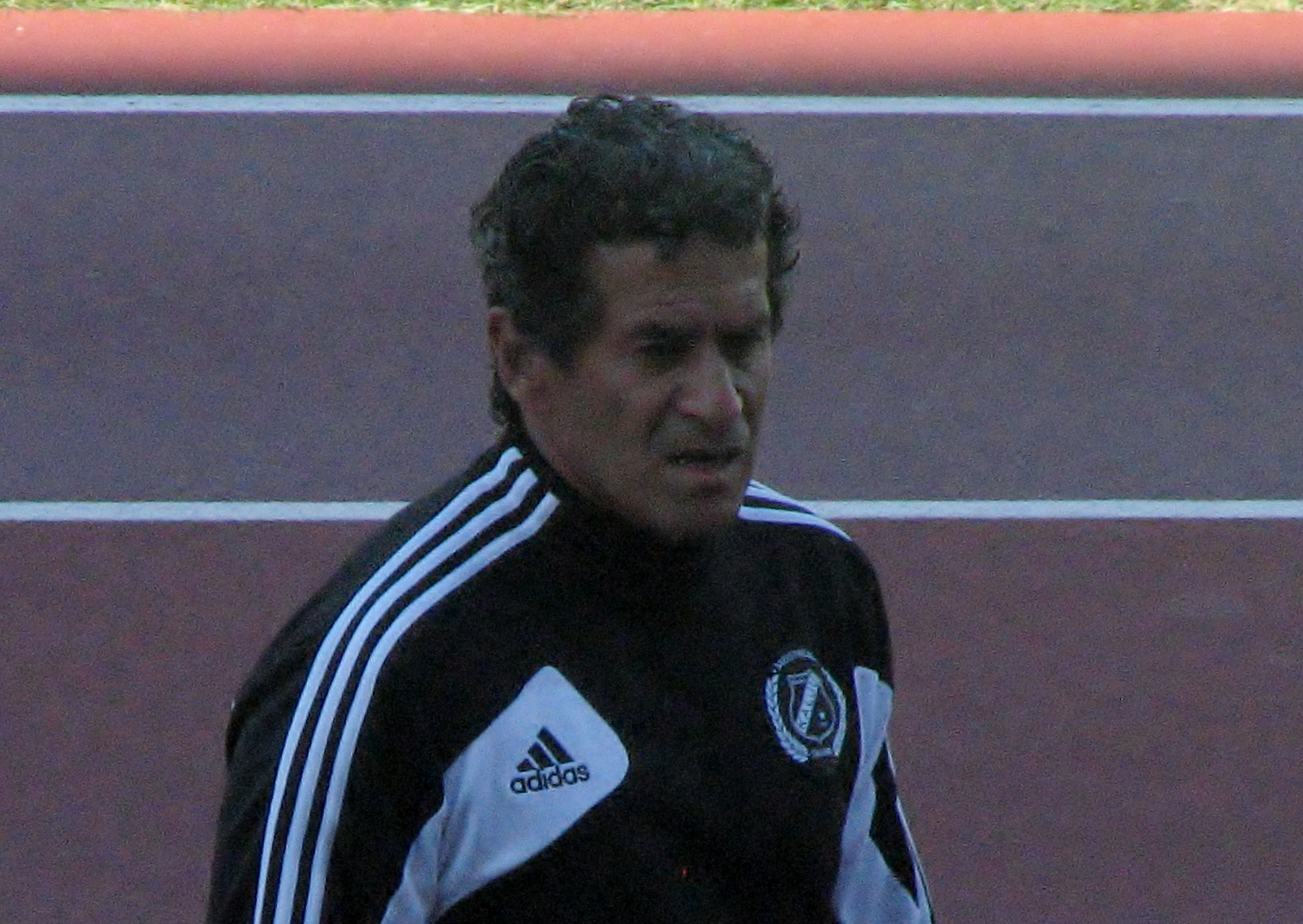

Personal information
- Full name: Getúlio Aurelio Fredo
- Date of birth: September 22, 1954 (age 72)
- Place of birth: Porto Alegre

Team information
- Current team: JK Jalgpallihaigla

Managerial career
- Years: Team
- 1981–1983: Sport Club Internacional (Women's team)
- 1984–1986: Thamrongthai FC
- 1993–1996: Nations United
- 1997–1999: FC Raisio
- 2000–2001: Nations United
- 2001–2002: FC Cosmos
- 2003: Brazil U17 (Assistant)
- 2003–2006: FC HDS
- 2007–2010: JK Nõmme Kalju
- 2008–2009: Estonia national futsal team
- 2010–2013: JK Nõmme Kalju (assistant)
- 2011–2012: Nõmme Kalju FC II
- 2015–2017: Nõmme Kalju FC III
- 2015: Nõmme Kalju FC (caretaker manager)
- 2018: JK Jalgpallihaigla

Getúlio Aurelio Fredo (born 22 September 1954) is a Brazilian-born football manager.

== Coaching career ==
Fredo's most recent position was as the head coach of the Estonian football club Nõmme Kalju. He led the club to their first ever participation in a European competition when they lost against FC Dinaburg in the first qualifying round of the 2009–10 UEFA Europa League.

Fredo's career in coaching has been a lengthy one. He worked with the group of coaches who led the Brazilian U-17 to their World Cup victory some years ago. He also spent many years coaching in Finland and Thailand.

He also coached the Estonia national beach soccer team.

In March 2021, he received a sexual harassment accusation, which became a major scandal in Estonia, fuelling movements to raise the age of consent from 14 to 16 years.

He is now banned from coaching football in any country that falls under FIFA.

== Personal life ==
Besides Brazilian, he also has a Finnish passport.
