= Aleksey Naumov (footballer) =

Russian footballer

Personal information
- Full name: Aleksey Sergeyevich Naumov
- Date of birth: 2 February 1972 (age 54)
- Place of birth: Leningrad, Soviet Union
- Height: 1.70 m (5 ft 7 in)
- Position: Defender

Youth career
- Kirovets Leningrad

Senior career*
Years	Team	Apps	(Gls)
1989–1990	Kirovets Leningrad	33	(0)
1991–1998	Zenit St. Petersburg	143	(9)
1998	→ Tyumen (loan)	12	(0)
1999	Rubin Kazan	11	(0)
2000–2001	Severstal Cherepovets	42	(2)
2002–2004	Torpedo-SKA Minsk	83	(11)
2005–2006	Dinamo Brest	46	(2)
2007	TEKS Ivanteyevka	6	(2)
2008	Karelia Petrozavodsk	11	(1)
2009–2012	Kalev Sillamäe	81	(16)

International career
1992	Soviet Union U-21	1	(0)
1993–1994	Russia U-21	5	(0)
- * Club domestic league appearances and goals

Aleksey Sergeyevich Naumov (Russian: Алексей Серге́евич Наумов; born 2 February 1972) is a Russian former professional footballer, who played as defender. He played in Soviet First League, Russian Top Division and in Estonian Meistriliiga.
