= 2021 in Estonian football =

Football in Estonia
- Season: 2021

Men's football
- Meistriliiga: Tallinna Levadia
- Esiliiga: Maardu Linnameeskond
- Esiliiga B: Viimsi

This page summarizes Estonian football in 2021. It contains information about the league system, national teams, beach football and futsal.

== National teams ==
=== Men ===
==== Senior ====
| 12 January Unofficial friendly | Estonia | 0–1 | (Hungary) Ferencvárosi TC | Marbella, Spain |
| 17:00 (UTC+3) | | Report | 73' Aïssa Laïdouni | Stadium: Estadio Municipal de Marbella; Attendance: 0 Referee: Juan Gabriel Gallegos Jimenez |

| 24 March 2022 WC quali. | Estonia | 2-6 | Czech Republic | Lublin, Poland |
| 21:45 (UTC+3) | Sappinen 12'; Anier 86' | Report | 18' Schick; 27' Barák; 32', 43', 48' Souček; 56' Jankto | Stadium: Arena Lublin; Attendance: 0 Referee: Anastasios Papapetrou |

| 27 March 2022 WC quali. | Belarus | 4-2 | Estonia | Minsk, Belarus |
| 20:00 (UTC+3) | Lisakovich 45' (pen.), 83'; Kendysh 64'; Savitskiy 81' | Report | 31', 55' Anier | Stadium: Dinamo Stadium; Attendance: 3,611; Referee: Robert Hennessy |

| 31 March Friendly | Sweden | 1-0 | Estonia | Stockholm, Sweden |
| 18:45 (UTC+3) | Berg 4' | Report | | Stadium: Friends Arena; Attendance: 0 Referee: Marco Fritz |

| 1 June Baltic Cup | Lithuania | 0–1 | Estonia | Vilnius, Lithuania |
| 19:00 (UTC+3) | | Report | 59' Anier | Stadium: LFF Stadium; Referee: Aleksandrs Anufrijevs |

| 4 June Friendly | Finland | 0–1 | Estonia | Helsinki, Finland |
| 19:00 (UTC+3) | | Report | 59' (pen.) Sappinen | Stadium: Olympic Stadium; Referee: Jorgen Burchardt |

| 10 June Baltic Cup | Estonia | 2–1 | Latvia | Tallinn, Estonia |
| 19:00 (UTC+3) | Käit 5', 40' | Report | (pen.), 84' Ikaunieks | Stadium: A. le Coq Arena; Attendance: 740; Referee: Robertas Valikonis |

| 2 September 2022 WC quali. | Estonia | 2–5 | Belgium | Tallinn, Estonia |
| 21:45 (UTC+3) | Käit 2'; Sorga 83' | Report | 22' Vanaken; 29', 52' Lukaku; 65' Witsel; 76' Foket | Stadium: A. Le Coq Arena; Attendance: 6,685; Referee: Guillermo Cuadra Fernandez |

| 5 September Friendly | Estonia | 0–1 | Northern Ireland | Tallinn, Estonia |
| 19:00 (UTC+3) | | Report | 75' Ferguson | Stadium: A. Le Coq Arena; Attendance: 2,524; Referee: Mads-Kristoffer Kristoffersen |

| 8 September 2022 WC quali. | Wales | 0-0 | Estonia | Cardiff, Wales |
| 21:45 (UTC+3) | | Report | | Stadium: Cardiff City Stadium; Attendance: 21,624; Referee: Ruddy Buquet |

| 8 October 2022 WC quali. | Estonia | 2–0 | Belarus | Tallinn, Estonia |
| 21:45 (UTC+3) | Sorga 58'; Zenjov 90+3' | Report | | Stadium: A. Le Coq Arena; Attendance: 3,597; Referee: Mohammed Al-Hakim |

| 11 October 2022 WC quali. | Estonia | 0–1 | Wales | Tallinn, Estonia |
| 21:45 (UTC+3) | | Report | 12' Moore | Stadium: A. Le Coq Arena; Attendance: 5,118; Referee: Sandro Schaerer |

| 13 November 2022 WC quali. | Belgium | 3–1 | Estonia | Brussels, Belgium |
| 21:45 (UTC+3) | Benteke 11'; Carrasco 53'; T. Hazard 74' | Report | 70' Sorga | Stadium: King Baudouin Stadium; Attendance: 29,865; Referee: Halil Umut Meler (Turkey) |

| 16 November 2022 WC quali. | Czech Republic | 2–0 | Estonia | Prague, Czech Republic |
| 21:45 (UTC+3) | Brabec 59'; Sýkora 85' | Report | | Stadium: Stadion Letná; Attendance: 10,076; Referee: Orel Grinfeld (Israel) |

==== Youth ====
| 8 June U21 — 2023 EC quali. | Austria | 2–0 | Estonia | Ried im Innkreis, Austria |
| 20:10 | Schmid 7'; Demir 56' | Report | | Stadium: Josko Arena; Referee: Genc Nuza |

| 3 September U21 — 2023 EC quali. | Estonia | v | Finland | Estonia |

| 7 September U21 — 2023 EC quali. | Estonia | v | Norway | Estonia |

| 6 October U19 — 2022 EC quali. | Austria | v | Estonia | Hungary |

| 8 October U21 — 2023 EC quali. | Estonia | v | Austria | Estonia |

| 9 October U19 — 2022 EC quali. | Hungary | v | Estonia | Hungary |

| 12 October U19 — 2022 EC quali. | Estonia | v | Belarus | Hungary |

| 12 October U21 — 2023 EC quali. | Norway | v | Estonia | Norway |

| 22 October U17 — 2022 EC quali. | Hungary | v | Estonia | Hungary |

| 25 October U17 — 2022 EC quali. | Iceland | v | Estonia | Hungary |

| 28 October U17 — 2022 EC quali. | Estonia | v | Georgia | Hungary |

| 11 November U21 — 2023 EC quali. | Croatia | v | Estonia | Croatia |

| 15 November U21 — 2023 EC quali. | Finland | v | Estonia | Finland |

=== Women ===
==== Senior ====
| 23 February 2022 EC quali. | Estonia | 0–9 | Slovenia | Tallinn, Estonia |
| 18:00 (UTC+3) | | Report | 31' Čonč; 44', 54' Zver; 60' Milovič; (pen.), 68', 81' Prašnikar; 70' Klopčič; 74', 77' Vindišar | Stadium: Sportland Arena; Attendance: 0 Referee: Eszter Urban |

| 10 June Baltic Cup | Estonia | 1–1 (4–5 p) | Faroe Islands | Alytus, Lithuania |
| 16:00 (UTC+3) | Kubassova 55' | Report | 31' Olsen | Stadium: Alytus Stadium; Attendance: 0 Referee: Donatas Rumšas |

| 13 June Baltic Cup | Latvia | 1–4 | Estonia | Jonava, Lithuania |
| 12:00 (UTC+3) | Fedotova 90' | Report | 16' Tammik; 28' Brant; 43' Himanen; 45' Lillemäe | Stadium: Central Stadium of Jonava; Attendance: 0 |

==== Youth ====
| 16 February U19 — 2021 EC quali. | Scotland | Cancelled | Estonia |

| 19 February U19 — 2021 EC quali. | Hungary | Cancelled | Estonia |

| 22 February U19 — 2021 EC quali. | Estonia | Cancelled | Montenegro |

| 27 June U19 — Baltic Cup | Estonia | v | Latvia | Estonia |

| 28 June U17 — Baltic Cup | Lithuania | v | Estonia | Latvia |

| 29 June U19 — Baltic Cup | Lithuania | v | Estonia | Estonia |

| 29 June U17 — Baltic Cup | Estonia | v | Latvia | Latvia |

=== Futsal ===
No arranged fixtures.

=== Beach ===
No arranged fixtures.

== League system ==
=== Men ===
- ^{a} – team cannot get promoted.
- – spent 2020 season in a higher division.
- – spent 2020 season in a lower division.
- – spent 2020 season in the same division, but in a different group.
- – spent 2020 season in the same division.
- – did not compete in the league system in 2020.
- – finished first in 2020 Meistriliiga.

==== Meistriliiga ====
The 2021 season, which is scheduled to begin on 5 March and end on 6 November, contains only one newcomer: Pärnu Vaprus, who have previously completed five seasons in the division, finished the 2020 Esiliiga season as champions and were therefore promoted, while Tallinna Kalev got relegated after placing tenth in the league.

| Pos | Team | Pld | W | D | L | GF | GA | GD | Pts | Qualification or relegation |
|---|---|---|---|---|---|---|---|---|---|---|
| 1 | Tallinna Levadia (C) | 32 | 25 | 3 | 4 | 84 | 38 | +46 | 78 | Qualification for the Champions League first qualifying round |
| 2 | Tallinna Flora | 32 | 23 | 8 | 1 | 90 | 23 | +67 | 77 | Qualification for the Europa Conference League first qualifying round |
| 3 | Paide Linnameeskond | 32 | 18 | 8 | 6 | 66 | 35 | +31 | 62 | |
| 4 | Nõmme Kalju | 32 | 13 | 6 | 13 | 57 | 44 | +13 | 45 | |
| 5 | Tallinna Legion | 32 | 11 | 7 | 14 | 49 | 48 | +1 | 40 | |
| 6 | Narva Trans | 32 | 9 | 6 | 17 | 36 | 61 | −25 | 33 | |
| 7 | Kuressaare | 30 | 10 | 4 | 16 | 39 | 47 | −8 | 34 | |
| 8 | Viljandi Tulevik (R) | 30 | 9 | 3 | 18 | 39 | 62 | −23 | 30 | Relegation to the Esiliiga (Note: On 22 December, Viljandi Tulevik, who finished 8th in 2021, released a statement, where they confirmed that they will give up their place in the top division and will play in Esiliiga due to financial problems. Therefore tenth-placed Pärnu Vaprus got readmitted to the league.) |
| 9 | Tartu Tammeka (O) | 30 | 7 | 4 | 19 | 34 | 72 | −38 | 25 | Qualification for the relegation play-offs |
| 10 | Pärnu Vaprus | 30 | 5 | 3 | 22 | 24 | 88 | −64 | 18 | Readmitted to the league |

Source: UEFA, Estonian FA (in Estonian)
Rules for classification: 1) Points; 2) Less matches awarded against; 3) Head-to-head points; 4) Head-to-head goal difference; 5) Matches won; 6) Goal difference; 7) Goals scored; 8) Away goals scored; 9) Fairplay ranking.
(C) Champions; (O) Play-off winners; (R) Relegated
Notes:
Locations of the 2021 Meistriliiga teams

Relegation play-off:

| Team 1 | Agg. | Team 2 | 1st leg | 2nd leg |
|---|---|---|---|---|
| Tallinna Kalev (Esiliiga 2nd) | 0:3 | Tartu Tammeka (Meistriliiga 9th) | 0:0 | 0:3 |

==== Esiliiga ====
Locations of the 2021 Esiliiga teams

The 2021 season had three team changes in comparison to the previous year. Pärnu Vaprus got promoted and was therefore replaced by the relegated Tallinna Kalev, who ended their three-year run in the top division. The last two teams - Vändra Vaprus and Kohtla-Järve Järve - were relegated to Esiliiga B and their spot was taken by third divisions top teams: Paide Linnameeskond U21 will be debuting in Esiliiga, while Tartu Welco returns after a year in the lower division. Before the season had started, multiple former Meistriliiga or the Estonian national team players joined a team in Esiliiga: Dmitri Kruglov and Roman Sobtšenko signed contracts with Maardu Linnameeskond, Ats Purje returned from abroad to reach an agreement with Tallinna Kalev and Taavi Rähn along with Toomas Tohver joined Pärnu JK's staff. On 7 April it was decided that the table will be split into two halves after the 27th round - six teams will fight for promotion and four will try to escape from relegation.

The league started with Maardu Linnameeskond and Tallinna Kalev dominating the first half of the season. Both teams had only lost one match after the first 16 rounds. At the other end of the table, three teams from Tartu County had difficulties getting points: FC Elva got two wins from the twelve rounds, Tammeka U21 were winless in eleven consecutive games and Welco got their first win on 31 July.

The season was also plagued with a few controversies. Firstly, Elva were forced to sack their chief executive Marek Naaris after it was revealed that he had been in contact with underage women. Another problem occurred after 23 September, when Kalev beat Maardu Linnameeskond 4–2. It was reported that a few of Maardu's players had manipulated with the game's score and therefore the Estonian FA and Maardu Linnameeskond started an investigation to find out the potential sinners.

| Pos | Team | Pld | W | D | L | GF | GA | GD | Pts | Promotion, qualification or relegation |
|---|---|---|---|---|---|---|---|---|---|---|
| 1 | Maardu Linnameeskond (C, R) | 30 | 23 | 4 | 3 | 99 | 30 | +69 | 73 | Achieved promotion to Meistriliiga but declined it and got relegated to II liiga |
| 2 | Tallinna Kalev (P) | 30 | 21 | 8 | 1 | 78 | 32 | +46 | 71 | Lost the promotion play-offs but got promoted due to Maardu declining |
| 3 | Paide Linnameeskond U21 (Note: Reserve teams are ineligible for promotion.) | 30 | 17 | 3 | 10 | 85 | 56 | +29 | 54 | |
| 4 | Nõmme United | 30 | 12 | 5 | 13 | 79 | 67 | +12 | 41 | |
| 5 | Tallinna Flora U21 | 27 | 11 | 6 | 10 | 38 | 47 | −9 | 39 | |
| 6 | Elva | 27 | 9 | 2 | 16 | 42 | 54 | −12 | 29 | |
| 7 | Tallinna Levadia U21 | 30 | 10 | 5 | 15 | 52 | 77 | −25 | 35 | |
| 8 | Pärnu | 30 | 8 | 5 | 17 | 38 | 61 | −23 | 29 | Lost the relegation play-offs but got readmitted to the league |
| 9 | Tartu Tammeka U21 (R) | 30 | 6 | 7 | 17 | 43 | 82 | −39 | 25 | Relegated to Esiliiga B |
| 10 | Tartu Welco (R) | 30 | 5 | 5 | 20 | 30 | 78 | −48 | 20 | Relegated to Esiliiga B |

Source: Soccerway (in English), Estonian FA (in Estonian)
Rules for classification: 1) Points; 2) Less matches awarded against; 3) Head-to-head points; 4) Head-to-head goal difference; 5) Matches won; 6) Goal difference; 7) Goals scored; 8) Away goals scored; 9) Fairplay ranking.
(C) Champions; (P) Promoted; (R) Relegated
Notes:

Relegation play-off:

| Team 1 | Agg. | Team 2 | 1st leg | 2nd leg |
|---|---|---|---|---|
| Ida-Virumaa Alliance (Esiliiga B 3rd) | 4:1 | Pärnu (Esiliiga 8th) | 4:1 | 0:0 |

==== Esiliiga B ====
The 2021 Esiliiga B season contains five teams from the last season and five new teams. Vändra Vaprus and Ida-Virumaa Alliance got both relegated from the higher tier and will therefore return to Esiliiga B after respectively one and two seasons. They replace the promoted Tartu Welco and Paide Linnameeskond U21. Three teams got relegated after the last season: Rakvere Tarvas, Keila and Võru Helios will all play in II liiga after respectively ten, four and two years. They will be replaced by three debutants - Tallinna Legion U21, Tallinn and Harju Laagri.

After the first half of the season, two clubs - Viimsi and Harju Laagri - had separated themselves from others by going on long winstreaks: Viimsi lost their first game in the 9th round and newcomer Harju Laagri did not lose a single game between 23 May and 17 July. Their competitors were all extremely close and the battle between 3rd and 10th place was very tight. Before the 28th round, when the table was split into two, Tallinna Kalev U21 made a powerful recovery by winning five games in a row with a goal difference of 27:7 and was therefore handed a place in the top six.

| Pos | Team | Pld | W | D | L | GF | GA | GD | Pts | Promotion, qualification or relegation |
|---|---|---|---|---|---|---|---|---|---|---|
| 1 | Viimsi (C, P) | 32 | 19 | 7 | 6 | 81 | 30 | +51 | 64 | Promoted to the Esiliiga |
| 2 | Harju Laagri (P) | 32 | 20 | 3 | 9 | 88 | 49 | +39 | 63 | Promoted to the Esiliiga |
| 3 | Ida-Virumaa Alliance (O, P) | 32 | 17 | 2 | 13 | 63 | 70 | −7 | 53 | Qualified for promotion play-offs, then promoted to Esiliiga |
| 4 | Tallinn | 32 | 16 | 2 | 14 | 68 | 66 | +2 | 50 | |
| 5 | Tallinna Kalev U21 (Note: Tallinna Kalev U21 is ineligible for promotion.) | 32 | 14 | 4 | 14 | 71 | 68 | +3 | 46 | |
| 6 | Tabasalu | 32 | 12 | 5 | 15 | 60 | 64 | −4 | 41 | |
| 7 | Tallinna Legion U21 | 30 | 12 | 1 | 17 | 64 | 83 | −19 | 37 | |
| 8 | Läänemaa | 30 | 10 | 3 | 17 | 65 | 94 | −29 | 33 | |
| 9 | Nõmme Kalju U21 | 30 | 10 | 3 | 17 | 56 | 66 | −10 | 33 | Got relegated to II liiga, then readmitted to the league |
| 10 | Vändra Vaprus (R) | 30 | 9 | 4 | 17 | 47 | 73 | −26 | 31 | Relegated to II liiga |

Source: Soccerway (in English), Estonian FA (in Estonian)
Rules for classification: 1) Points; 2) Less matches awarded against; 3) Head-to-head points; 4) Head-to-head goal difference; 5) Matches won; 6) Goal difference; 7) Goals scored; 8) Away goals scored; 9) Fairplay ranking.
(C) Champions; (O) Play-off winners; (P) Promoted; (R) Relegated
Notes:
Locations of the 2021 Esiliiga B teams, TALLINN = Kalev U21, Legion U21, Kalju U21, Tallinn

Relegation play-off:
On 30 October, the Estonian FA decided that due to the new COVID-19 related restrictions, the play-offs between Esiliiga B and II liiga will be cancelled.

==== II liiga ====
The 2021 season will have teams from 12 different counties for the first time in the league's history. The season is scheduled to begin on 27 March and end on 24 October.

Locations of the 2021 II liiga teams

Group A (North & East)
In comparison to the previous season, only four teams got promoted or relegated: while Tallinn and Tallinna Legion U21 got promoted to Esiliiga B for the first time, Tartu Tammeka III and Jõgeva Wolves returned to the lower divisions after respectively three and two years in II liiga. These teams are replaced by Võru Helios, Rakvere Tarvas (both relegated from Esiliiga B), 2020 III liiga's champion Tartu Kalev and III liiga South's best team Elva II. In addition Kohtla-Järve Järve II changed its name to Ida-Virumaa Alliance.

Group B (South & West)
The II liiga S/W will consist of 14 teams of which eleven remain the same as last season. The only team that got promoted was second-placed Harju Laagri, who will be replaced by another Harju County club Keila. Whereas 2020 season's last and third to last team - Pärnu Poseidon and Põhja-Sakala - got relegated, the 13th placed Kose got readmitted for the second year in a row. The spots that those teams left vacant, were filled by III liiga West's top two. Hiiu County will have a team (Hiiumaa) in the fourth division for the first time since 2013 and Rummu Dünamo returns to the league after spending four years in III liiga.

Group A (North & East)
| Pos | Team | Pld | Pts |
|---|---|---|---|
| 1 | Tartu Kalev (C, P) | 23 | 55 |
| 2 | Narva Trans U21 | 23 | 49 |
| 3 | FCI Tallinn | 23 | 49 |
| 4 | Sillamäe Kalev | 22 | 49 |
| 5 | Võru Helios | 23 | 41 |
| 6 | Maardu Linnameeskond II | 23 | 39 |
| 7 | Jõgeva Noorus-96 | 22 | 30 |
| 8 | Elva II | 22 | 30 |
| 9 | Rakvere Tarvas | 23 | 27 |
| 10 | Tartu Welco II | 23 | 25 |
| 11 | Tartu Helios | 23 | 20 |
| 12 | Ida-Virumaa Alliance U21^{a} | 21 | 14 |
| 13 | Lasnamäe Ajax | 23 | 14 |
| 14 | Põhja-Tallinna Volta | 22 | 10 |

Source: EJL
(C) Champions; (P) Promoted

Group B (South & West)
| Pos | Team | Pld | Pts |
|---|---|---|---|
| 1 | Paide Linnameeskond III (C) | 23 | 57 |
| 2 | Kuressaare II | 20 | 47 |
| 3 | Raplamaa (P) | 22 | 46 |
| 4 | Pärnu Vaprus II | 22 | 42 |
| 5 | Tallinna Flora U19 | 23 | 42 |
| 6 | Hiiumaa | 23 | 38 |
| 7 | Viimsi II^{a} | 23 | 32 |
| 8 | Saue | 23 | 29 |
| 9 | Viljandi Tulevik U21 | 23 | 29 |
| 10 | Raasiku Joker | 23 | 28 |
| 11 | Tallinna Piraaja | 23 | 24 |
| 12 | Keila | 23 | 15 |
| 13 | Rummu Dünamo | 23 | 14 |
| 14 | Kose | 22 | 10 |

Source: EJL
(C) Champions; (P) Promoted

Champion's match:
On 30 October, the Estonian FA decided that due to the new COVID-19 related restrictions, the champion's match between II liiga N/E and II liiga S/W champions will be cancelled.

Relegation play-off:
On 30 October, the Estonian FA decided that due to the new COVID-19 related restrictions, the play-offs between II liiga and III liiga will be cancelled.

==== III liiga ====
The fifth division's format remains the same as on previous years: each group's champion gets promoted to II liiga, second-placed clubs enter the promotion play-offs, 10th placed clubs enter the relegation play-offs and the bottom two will be relegated. The season starts on 11 April and ends on 10 October. For the first time in 15 years, there are no teams from any islands.

Locations of the 2021 III liiga teams

Group A (North)
2021 III liiga North consists of 12 teams, ten teams from Tallinn and two from Harju County. In comparison to the last season, there are only two changes: the two teams that finished last in 2020 (Tallinna Rumori Calcio and Tallinna Toompea) got relegated and therefore replace by two clubs, who debuted in the Estonian league system in 2020. While Tallinna Pocarr narrowly missed out on promotion in III liiga W, then Tallinna ReUnited became IV liiga's champion after winning every match in the A-tier. Before the start of the season reigning champion Lilleküla Retro dropped out of the league.

Group B (South)
The South group's line-up changed a lot in comparison to the previous year: in total six new teams joined the league. Three of them – Põhja-Sakala, Tartu Tammeka III and Jõgeva Wolves – got relegated from II liiga after respectively two, three and two seasons. One team (Viljandi Tulevik III) got promoted from IV liiga, one (Paide Linnameeskond IV) changes groups and one (Tartu Team Helm), who reached Rahvaliiga's (people's league) final, debuted in the Estonian league system. These clubs replaced Elva II (promoted), Tartu Tammeka IV, Tarvastu & Tõrva ÜM, Tartu Helios II, Tartu TRT77 (all disbanded) and Äksi Wolves (relegated).

Group C (East)
Likewise to the previous season, III liiga East did not have twelve teams in the division. This happened due to 2020 IV liiga's bronze medalists Aruküla withdrawing from the league. Eight of the other teams remained the same, while Lasnamäe Ajax II was promoted from IV liiga in addition to Põhja-Tallinn and Tallinn II making their debuts in the league system.

Group D (West)
The III liiga's West group consisted of twelve teams of which only five competed the previous season. There were four newcomers (Nõmme United U21, Harju Laagri II, Tallinna Maksatransport, Raplamaa II), two promoted from IV liiga (Rummu Dünamo II, Läänemaa Harjumaa) and one relegated from II liiga (Pärnu Poseidon). They replace Hiiumaa, Rummu Dünamo (promoted), Põhja-Tallinna Volta II (relegated), Tallinna Pocarr (transferred to III liiga North) and Keila II (ceased to exist).

Group A (North)
| Pos | Team | Pld | Pts |
|---|---|---|---|
| 1 | Tallinna Zapoos (C, P) | 19 | 45 |
| 2 | Tallinna Eston Villa | 19 | 45 |
| 3 | Tallinna Zenit | 19 | 39 |
| 4 | Tallinna ReUnited | 19 | 35 |
| 5 | Tallinna Ararat | 19 | 32 |
| 6 | Nõmme Kalju III | 19 | 30 |
| 7 | Saku Sporting | 19 | 26 |
| 8 | Tallinna Pocarr | 19 | 25 |
| 9 | Tallinna Hell Hunt | 20 | 20 |
| 10 | Tallinna Štrommi | 19 | 5 |
| 11 | Tallinna Dünamo (R) | 19 | 1 |

Source: EJL
(C) Champions; (P) Promoted; (R) Relegated

Group B (South)
| Pos | Team | Pld | Pts |
|---|---|---|---|
| 1 | Otepää (C, P) | 21 | 56 |
| 2 | Tartu Team Helm | 21 | 47 |
| 3 | Vastseliina | 21 | 41 |
| 4 | Paide Linnameeskond IV | 21 | 35 |
| 5 | Tartu Welco X | 21 | 34 |
| 6 | Imavere | 21 | 29 |
| 7 | Jõgeva Wolves | 21 | 24 |
| 8 | Tartu Tammeka III | 21 | 21 |
| 9 | Valga Warrior | 21 | 19 |
| 10 | Põhja-Sakala | 21 | 18 |
| 11 | Põlva Lootos (R) | 21 | 17 |
| 12 | Viljandi Tulevik III (R) | 21 | 16 |

Source: EJL
(C) Champions; (P) Promoted; (R) Relegated

Group C (East)
| Pos | Team | Pld | Pts |
|---|---|---|---|
| 1 | Türi Ganvix (C, P) | 19 | 54 |
| 2 | Jõhvi Phoenix | 20 | 52 |
| 3 | Tallinn II | 19 | 36 |
| 4 | Maardu Aliens | 19 | 28 |
| 5 | Loo | 19 | 24 |
| 6 | Rakvere Tarvas II | 19 | 23 |
| 7 | Lasnamäe Ajax II | 19 | 21 |
| 8 | Järva-Jaani | 19 | 19 |
| 9 | Anija | 19 | 18 |
| 10 | Kohtla-Järve Järve III | 19 | 13 |
| 11 | Põhja-Tallinn (R) | 19 | 13 |

Source: EJL
(C) Champions; (P) Promoted; (R) Relegated

Group D (West)
| Pos | Team | Pld | Pts |
|---|---|---|---|
| 1 | Nõmme United U21 (C, P) | 21 | 63 |
| 2 | Harju Laagri II | 21 | 54 |
| 3 | Tallinna Maksatransport | 21 | 39 |
| 4 | Tabasalu II | 21 | 36 |
| 5 | Raplamaa II | 22 | 32 |
| 6 | Läänemaa Haapsalu | 21 | 31 |
| 7 | Rummu Dünamo II | 21 | 31 |
| 8 | Pärnu II | 21 | 23 |
| 9 | Märjamaa Kompanii | 21 | 18 |
| 10 | Tallinna Legion III | 21 | 18 |
| 11 | Pärnu Poseidon (R) | 21 | 17 |
| 12 | Kernu Kadakas (D, R) | 22 | 1 |

Source: EJL
(C) Champions; (D) Disqualified; (P) Promoted; (R) Relegated

Champion's match:
On 30 October, the Estonian FA decided that due to the new COVID-19 related restrictions, the champion's match between III liiga champions will be cancelled.

Relegation play-off:
On 30 October, the Estonian FA decided that due to the new COVID-19 related restrictions, the play-offs between III liiga and IV liiga will be cancelled.

==== IV liiga ====
Group A (North)
| Pos | Team | Pld | Pts |
|---|---|---|---|
| 1 | Tallinna TransferWise | 14 | 31 |
| 2 | Kristiine | 14 | 29 |
| 3 | Rumori Calcio Tallinn | 14 | 27 |
| 4 | Tallinna Teleios | 14 | 24 |
| 5 | Saku Sporting II | 14 | 22 |
| 6 | Viimsi Lõvid | 14 | 15 |
| 7 | Kurtna | 14 | 12 |
| 8 | Põhja-Tallinna Volta II | 14 | 1 |

Source: EJL

Group B (North/South)
| Pos | Team | Pld | Pts |
|---|---|---|---|
| 1 | Illi & Jõgeva Noorus-96 | 10 | 22 |
| 2 | Tallinna Eston Villa II | 10 | 20 |
| 3 | Äksi Wolves | 10 | 19 |
| 4 | Tallinna Piraaja II | 10 | 16 |
| 5 | Tallinna Soccernet | 10 | 7 |
| 6 | Pärnu Poseidon II | 10 | 3 |

Source: EJL

Group C (North/East)
| Pos | Team | Pld | Pts |
|---|---|---|---|
| 1 | Tallinna Olympic Olybet | 10 | 30 |
| 2 | Harju Laagri III | 10 | 19 |
| 3 | Toompea | 10 | 13 |
| 4 | Kuusalu Kalev | 10 | 11 |
| 5 | Tallinna Reaal | 10 | 10 |
| 6 | Maarjamäe Vigri | 10 | 4 |

Source: EJL

Group D (North/West)
| Pos | Team | Pld | Pts |
|---|---|---|---|
| 1 | Tallinna Wolves | 10 | 23 |
| 2 | Tallinna Jalgpallihaigla | 10 | 21 |
| 3 | Tallinna Sssolutions | 10 | 18 |
| 4 | Rumori Calcio Tallinn II | 10 | 11 |
| 5 | Lelle | 10 | 10 |
| 6 | Kose II | 10 | 2 |

Source: EJL

Group A (First tier)
| Pos | Team | Pld | Pts |
|---|---|---|---|
| 1 | Tallinna Wolves (C) | 6 | 14 |
| 2 | Tallinna Olympic Olybet | 6 | 13 |
| 3 | Tallinna Jalgpallihaigla | 6 | 10 |
| 4 | Kristiine | 6 | 9 |
| 5 | Tallinna TransferWise | 6 | 6 |
| 6 | Harju Laagri III | 6 | 4 |
| 7 | Tallinna Eston Villa II | 6 | 3 |

Source: EJL
(C) Champions

Group B (Second tier)
| Pos | Team | Pld | Pts |
|---|---|---|---|
| 1 | Saku Sporting II | 7 | 15 |
| 2 | Kuusalu Kalev | 7 | 12 |
| 3 | Tallinna Teleios | 7 | 11 |
| 4 | Tallinna Sssolutions | 7 | 11 |
| 5 | Rumori Calcio Tallinn | 7 | 10 |
| 6 | Äksi Wolves | 6 | 10 |
| 7 | Rumori Calcio Tallinn II | 7 | 7 |
| 8 | Tallinna Piraaja II | 7 | 6 |
| 9 | Toompea | 7 | 4 |

Source: EJL

Group C (Third tier)
| Pos | Team | Pld | Pts |
|---|---|---|---|
| 1 | Viimsi Lõvid | 7 | 21 |
| 2 | Tallinna Reaal | 7 | 15 |
| 3 | Maarjamäe Vigri | 7 | 12 |
| 4 | Tallinna Soccernet | 7 | 12 |
| 5 | Kurtna | 7 | 8 |
| 6 | Kose II | 7 | 7 |
| 7 | Lelle | 7 | 4 |
| 8 | Pärnu Poseidon II (D) | 7 | 3 |

Source: EJL
(D) Disqualified

=== Women ===
==== Naiste Meistriliiga ====
The 2021 Women's higher division had only one team change in comparison to the previous year: the relegated Nõmme Kalju - who later decided against competing in the league system completely due to the scandal with their coach Getulio Aurelio - was replaced by Esiliiga champion Tallinna Ajax & Paide Linnanaiskond joint team, who at the start of the season changed their name to Lasnamäe FC Ajax. This season was also the first that had all teams play more than 20 games: the Estonian FA decided that each team will play each other three times and after that the table would be split into two, where each team will play another three games. In total all clubs have 24 matches.

Unlike the previous seasons, Tallinna Flora had a strong competitor - Saku Sporting -, who was neck and neck with them until the last round. The title was decided on 6 November, when FC Flora beat their rivals 2:1 and was crowned as champions for the fourth season in a row, meanwhile Saku finished second for the first time in their history. At the same time, the relegation battle was not as intense: newcomer Lasnamäe Ajax got their first point in the 14th round, when they drew with Tartu Tammeka. Also, their season ended prematurely, because on 9 October they forfeited the second match of the season and were therefore disqualified. The division's top scorer came from Tallinna Flora, where forward Lisette Tammik scored 25 goals.

| Pos | Team | Pld | W | D | L | GF | GA | GD | Pts | Promotion, qualification or relegation |
|---|---|---|---|---|---|---|---|---|---|---|
| 1 | Tallinna Flora (C) | 24 | 22 | 1 | 1 | 108 | 11 | +97 | 67 | Champions |
| 2 | Saku Sporting | 24 | 21 | 0 | 3 | 71 | 25 | +46 | 63 | |
| 3 | Tallinna Kalev | 24 | 14 | 0 | 10 | 59 | 47 | +12 | 42 | |
| 4 | Pärnu Vaprus | 24 | 11 | 1 | 12 | 54 | 49 | +5 | 34 | |
| 5 | Põlva Lootos | 24 | 10 | 2 | 12 | 32 | 41 | −9 | 32 | |
| 6 | Viljandi Tulevik & Suure-Jaani United | 24 | 8 | 1 | 15 | 38 | 55 | −17 | 25 | |
| 7 | Tartu Tammeka | 24 | 6 | 2 | 16 | 25 | 67 | −42 | 20 | |
| 8 | Lasnamäe Ajax (D, R) | 24 | 0 | 1 | 23 | 5 | 97 | −92 | 1 | Disqualified and relegated to Esiliiga |

Source: EJL
Rules for classification: 1) Points; 2) Less matches awarded against; 3) Head-to-head points; 4) Head-to-head goal difference; 5) Matches won; 6) Goal difference; 7) Goals scored; 8) Away goals scored; 9) Drawing lots; 10) Fairplay ranking.
(C) Champions; (D) Disqualified; (R) Relegated
Locations of the 2021 Meistriliiga teams

Relegation play-off:
On 30 October, the Estonian FA decided that due to the new COVID-19 related restrictions, the promotion/relegation play-offs will be cancelled.

==== Naiste Esiliiga ====
2021 Women's second division has three participant less than the previous season: Lasnamäe Ajax (got promoted), Tallinna Legion, Tartu Tammeka II, Kohtla-Järve Järve all lost their place in Esiliiga. While eight teams remain the same, Saku Sporting's reserve team makes its debut in the league system. Nõmme Kalju was also originally supposed to take part, but due to a sexual harassment accusation involving Kalju's head coach Getúlio Fredo, they decided to compete in Rahvaliiga.

| Pos | Team | Pld | W | D | L | GF | GA | GD | Pts | Promotion, qualification or relegation |
|---|---|---|---|---|---|---|---|---|---|---|
| 1 | Tabasalu | 16 | 16 | 0 | 0 | 83 | 7 | +76 | 48 | Promotion to 2021 Naiste Meistriliiga |
| 2 | Saku Sporting II | 17 | 8 | 5 | 4 | 37 | 26 | +11 | 29 | |
| 3 | Tallinna Flora II | 17 | 7 | 8 | 2 | 30 | 13 | +17 | 29 | |
| 4 | Tallinna Kalev II | 18 | 9 | 4 | 5 | 45 | 31 | +14 | 31 | |
| 5 | Elva | 17 | 6 | 3 | 8 | 26 | 36 | −10 | 21 | |
| 6 | Jõhvi Phoenix | 17 | 5 | 2 | 10 | 19 | 47 | −28 | 17 | |
| 7 | Kuressaare | 17 | 4 | 6 | 7 | 19 | 37 | −18 | 18 | |
| 8 | Rakvere Tarvas | 17 | 2 | 4 | 11 | 16 | 47 | −31 | 10 | |
| 9 | Narva Trans | 16 | 1 | 4 | 11 | 19 | 50 | −31 | 7 | |

Source: EJL
Rules for classification: 1) Points; 2) Less matches awarded against; 3) Head-to-head points; 4) Head-to-head goal difference; 5) Matches won; 6) Goal difference; 7) Goals scored; 8) Away goals scored; 9) Drawing lots; 10) Fairplay ranking.
Locations of the 2021 Esiliiga teams

=== Futsal ===
On 11 December, the FA decided that all indoor football leagues would be suspended due to the spread of COVID-19. The Coolbet Saaliliiga resumed on 8 January 2021, while the lower leagues resumed in February.

==== Coolbet Saaliliiga ====
The 2020–21 season began on 30 October 2020 with eight clubs. Seven teams remained the same as the previous year, the only change coming from Esiliiga's second-placed Rummu Dünamo getting promoted and replacing Sillamäe Alexela, who did not enter the league system. Therefore, Npm Sillamäe Silmet, who were last in 2019–20, were readmitted.

The league stage of the competition was dominated by reigning champion Viimsi Smsraha, who won all fourteen matches, thus becoming the first team to complete a perfect league season in Saaliliiga's history. Narva United spent most of the season in second place and finally reached play-off semifinals for the second time in successive years. Third place belonged to Tartu's Ravens Futsal Ares Security, who finished in the top three for the first time in their history. The team's start to the season was abysmal, picking up only two wins in their first eight matches, but getting 18 points from last six games raised them higher in the table. Newcomer Rummu Dünamo finished bottom with only two wins from fourteen games.

| Pos | Team | Pld | W | D | L | GF | GA | GD | Pts | Promotion, qualification or relegation |
|---|---|---|---|---|---|---|---|---|---|---|
| 1 | Viimsi Smsraha | 14 | 14 | 0 | 0 | 115 | 29 | +86 | 42 | Championship play-off semifinal |
| 2 | Narva United | 14 | 8 | 3 | 3 | 63 | 44 | +19 | 27 | Championship play-off semifinal |
| 3 | Ravens Futsal Ares Security | 14 | 8 | 1 | 5 | 65 | 48 | +17 | 25 | Championship play-off quarterfinal |
| 4 | Tallinna Cosmos | 14 | 7 | 2 | 5 | 73 | 48 | +25 | 23 | Championship play-off quarterfinal |
| 5 | Sillamäe Npm Silmet | 14 | 6 | 1 | 7 | 84 | 91 | −7 | 19 | Championship play-off quarterfinal |
| 6 | Kohila | 14 | 3 | 1 | 10 | 51 | 79 | −28 | 10 | Championship play-off quarterfinal |
| 7 | Tartu Maksimum Welco | 14 | 3 | 1 | 10 | 53 | 104 | −51 | 10 | Relegation play-offs |
| 8 | Rummu Dünamo | 14 | 2 | 1 | 11 | 52 | 113 | −61 | 7 | Relegation |

Rules for classification: 1) Points; 2) Less matches awarded against; 3) Head-to-head points; 4) Head-to-head goal difference; 5) Matches won; 6) Goal difference; 7) Goals scored; 8) Draw.
Locations of the 2020-21 Coolbet Saaliliiga teams

Play-off:

Quarterfinal
3 | Ravens Futsal Ares Security | 9 | 6 | X | 2
6 | Kohila | 2 | 3 | X | 0
4 | Tallinna Cosmos | 8 | 5 | X | 2
5 | Sillamäe Npm Silmet | 2 | 2 | X | 0

Semifinal
2 | Narva United | 2 | 5 | 1 | 1
3 | Ravens Futsal Ares Security | 4 | 3 | 4 | 2
1 | Viimsi Smsraha | 2 (1) | 3 | 6 | 2
4 | Tallinna Cosmos | 2 (3) | 1 | 2 | 1

Final
3 | Ravens Futsal Ares Security | 1 | 3 | 2 | 0
1 | Viimsi Smsraha | 3 | 6 | 6 | 3
3rd place
2 | Narva United | 3
4 | Tallinna Cosmos | 1

Relegation play-off:
Due to the COVID-19 pandemic Esiliiga could not be finished and therefore the Estonian FA decided that the following year's Coolbet Saaliliiga will be contested between ten teams: all eight clubs in 2021 Coolbet Saaliliiga remain (Rummu Dünamo will not get relegated) and in addition two of the best Esiliiga team's also join. Because the teams in the second division did not play the same number of games, it was decided that a small tournament - to determine the promoted sides - will be held in May 2021. The clubs competing for promotion were: Sillamäe Kalev, Rõuge Saunamaa and Aruküla Radius. League leader Kadrina Vitamin Well was also given the opportunity, but they decided to decline.

| Pos | Team | Pld | W | D | L | GF | GA | GD | Pts | Qualification | SIL | RÕU | ARU |
|---|---|---|---|---|---|---|---|---|---|---|---|---|---|
| 1 | Sillamäe Kalev | 2 | 1 | 0 | 1 | 12 | 8 | +4 | 3 | Promotion to 2022 Coolbet Saaliliiga | — | — | 7–2 |
| 2 | Rõuge Saunamaa | 2 | 1 | 0 | 1 | 8 | 8 | 0 | 3 | Promotion to 2022 Coolbet Saaliliiga | 6–5 | — | — |
| 3 | Aruküla Radius | 2 | 1 | 0 | 1 | 5 | 9 | −4 | 3 | | — | 3–2 | — |

Legend: Blue = home team win; Yellow = draw; Red = away team win.

==== Saali Esiliiga ====
Esiliiga's teamlist remained almost the same as the previous year: the only changes being that Rummu Dünamo got promoted to Coolbet Saaliliiga and II liiga's top two Aruküla Radius and Rõuge Saunamaa got promoted to the league. Due to Sillamäe disbanding, Narva Ganza were readmitted to the second division. There were also a few name changes: Kadrina, Aruküla Unibox and Sillamäe Alexela II are now known as Kadrina Vitamin Well, Aruküla Radius and Sillamäe Kalev.

On 30 April 2021 - after Esiliiga had been stopped for almost two months - the Estonian FA decided to end the season. Due to the teams having played an uneven number of games, it was decided that the following year's top division will have ten clubs instead of eight. The two promoted sides would be determined in a mini tournament. While Sillamäe Kalev, Rõuge Saunamaa and Aruküla Radius took part in the tournament, Kadrina Vitamin Well declined from it.

| Pos | Team | Pld | W | D | L | GF | GA | GD | Pts | Promotion, qualification or relegation |
|---|---|---|---|---|---|---|---|---|---|---|
| 1 | Kadrina Vitamin Well | 12 | 8 | 1 | 3 | 88 | 71 | +17 | 25 | Withdrew from promotion |
| 2 | Sillamäe Kalev (P) | 11 | 6 | 2 | 3 | 67 | 51 | +16 | 20 | Play-off tournament |
| 3 | Viimsi Smsraha U19 (Note: Reserve teams are ineligible for promotion.) | 11 | 6 | 0 | 5 | 74 | 57 | +17 | 18 | |
| 4 | Narva United II | 10 | 5 | 2 | 3 | 43 | 29 | +14 | 17 | |
| 5 | Aruküla Radius | 10 | 5 | 1 | 4 | 57 | 38 | +19 | 16 | Play-off tournament |
| 6 | Rõuge Saunamaa (P) | 8 | 5 | 0 | 3 | 39 | 39 | 0 | 15 | Play-off tournament |
| 7 | Jõgeva Wolves | 9 | 3 | 0 | 6 | 46 | 69 | −23 | 9 | Relegation play-offs |
| 8 | Narva Ganza | 11 | 0 | 0 | 11 | 26 | 86 | −60 | 0 | Relegation |

Rules for classification: 1) Points; 2) Less matches awarded against; 3) Head-to-head points; 4) Head-to-head goal difference; 5) Matches won; 6) Goal difference; 7) Goals scored; 8) Draw.
(P) Promoted
Notes:
Locations of the 2020-21 Saali Esiliiga teams

Relegation play-off:

| Team 1 | Agg. | Team 2 | 1st leg | 2nd leg |
|---|---|---|---|---|
| (Esiliiga 7th) | | (II liiga 2nd) | | |

==== Saali Teine liiga ====
The 2020–21 season's indoor football lowest league consisted of five clubs. Originally Narva Ganza, who was placed last in Esiliiga, was relegated into Teine liiga, but due to Sillamäe Dina not competing in the league system, they were readmitted to the second tier. Four of the five clubs remain the same, the only newcomer being Wolves III.

The season was cancelled on 9 February, because of the strict COVID-19 rules in Estonia, which allowed only Meistriliiga's and Esiliiga's teams play. Due to the teams not playing equal numbers of games, the season did not have a champion.

| Pos | Team | Pld | W | D | L | GF | GA | GD | Pts | Promotion, qualification or relegation |
|---|---|---|---|---|---|---|---|---|---|---|
| 1 | Otepää Kanepi vald | 6 | 3 | 1 | 2 | 32 | 15 | +17 | 10 | Promotion |
| 2 | Äksi Wolves | 5 | 3 | 0 | 2 | 39 | 28 | +11 | 9 | Promotion play-offs |
| 3 | Rantipol Võru Helios | 3 | 2 | 1 | 0 | 34 | 8 | +26 | 7 | |
| 4 | Rummu Dünamo II | 4 | 2 | 1 | 1 | 28 | 25 | +3 | 7 | |
| 5 | Wolves III | 6 | 0 | 1 | 5 | 17 | 74 | −57 | 1 | |

Updated to match(es) played on 28 January. Source:
Rules for classification: 1) Points; 2) Less matches awarded against; 3) Head-to-head points; 4) Head-to-head goal difference; 5) Matches won; 6) Goal difference; 7) Goals scored; 8) Draw.
Locations of the 2020-21 Saali Teine liiga teams

== Cup competitions ==
=== Tipneri karikavõistlused ===
Quarterfinals
PL | Tallinna Flora | 2
PL | Tartu Tammeka | 1
PL | Narva Trans | 2
EL | Tallinna Kalev | 1
PL | Nõmme Kalju | 1
PL | Viljandi Tulevik ^{AET} | 2
PL | Tallinna Levadia | 2
EL | Maardu Linnameeskond | 0

Semifinals
PL | Tallinna Flora | 2
PL | Narva Trans | 1
PL | Viljandi Tulevik | 0
PL | Tallinna Levadia | 2

Final
PL | Tallinna Flora | 0
PL | Tallinna Levadia | 1

Home teams listed on top of bracket. (AET): At Extra Time, (PL): Premium liiga, (EL): Esiliiga

=== Small Cup ===
Quarterfinals
II | Raplamaa ^{PSO} | 3
III | Tallinna Ararat | 3
II | Tartu Helios | 1
II | Kuressaare II | 2
III | Tallinna Eston Villa | 2
II | Tartu Welco II | 1
III | Tartu Team Helm | 2
III | Tallinna Zapoos | 6

Semifinals
II | Raplamaa | 0
II | Kuressaare II | 1
III | Tallinna Eston Villa | 1
III | Tallinna Zapoos | 5

Final
II | Kuressaare II | 2
III | Tallinna Zapoos | 3

Home teams listed on top of bracket. (AET): At Extra Time. (PSO): Penalty Shoot-Out

=== Women's Cup ===
Quarterfinals
EL | Nõmme Kalju | –
ML | Põlva Lootos | +
ML | Saku Sporting | 1
ML | Tallinna Flora | 3
RL | Põhja-Tallinna Volta | –
ML | Pärnu Vaprus | +
ML | Tulevik & Suure-Jaani Unitedi ÜN | 0
ML | Tallinna Kalev | 4

Semifinals
ML | Põlva Lootos | 2
ML | Tallinna Flora | 7
ML | Pärnu Vaprus | 3
ML | Tallinna Kalev | 1

Final
ML | Tallinna Flora | 3
ML | Pärnu Vaprus | 0

- Nõmma Kalju and Põhja-Tallinna Volta withdrew from the competition.

Home teams listed on top of bracket. (AET): At Extra Time, (ML): Meistriliiga, (EL): Esiliiga, (RL): Rahvaliiga

=== Futsal's Cup ===
On 26 February the Estonian FA decided that the Futsal's Cup would be cancelled due to the ongoing COVID-19 pandemic.

=== Supercups ===
| 24 October 2020 Futsal's Supercup | Viimsi Smsraha | 6–1 | Narva United | Tallinn |
| 19:00 | Sorokin 2', 26'; Bõstrov 15'; Fetko 20', 32'; Ervin Stüf 38' | Report | 27' Fedorov | Stadium: Kalevi Spordihall; Attendance: 177; Referee: Andrei Karhu, Dmitri Kulikov |

| 5 March 2021 Men's Supercup | Tallinna Flora | 1–0 | Paide Linnameeskond | Tallinn |
| 19:00 | Sappinen 52' | Report | | Stadium: Sportland Arena; Attendance: 0 Referee: Karl Koppel |

| 2 April 2021 Women's Supercup | Tallinna Flora | 0–1 | Tallinna Kalev | Tallinn |
| 18:00 | | Report | 18' Maksimova | Stadium: Sportland Arena; Attendance: 0 Referee: Triinu Vaher |

| 12 June 2021 Beach Football's Supercup | SK Augur Enemat | 9–5 | BSC Thunder Häcker | Pärnu |
| | | Report | | Stadium: Sportland Beach Arena |

== County competition ==
On 25 June it was decided that the 2021 edition of the Estonian County Competition will be cancelled due to tight game schedule caused by the COVID-19 pandemic.

== European competitions ==
Due to the fact that the Estonian FA lost five places in the association ranking for the 2020–21 season - Estonians fell from 46th place to 51st place - they were only given three spots instead of the usual four in European competitions. 2020 Meistriliiga's champion will start in the UEFA Champions League First qualifying round, while second placed team and the Estonian Cup winners will go to UEFA Europa Conference League First qualifying round.

Tallinna Flora

| 6 July 2021 Champions League Q1 | Flora (Estonia) | 2–0 | (Malta) Hibernians | A. Le Coq Arena, Tallinn |
| 18:00 (19:00 EEST) | Sappinen 75', 89' | Report | | Attendance: 1,804; Referee: Lazar Lukić (Serbia) |

| 13 July 2021 Champions League Q1 | Hibernians (Malta) | 0–3 | (Estonia) Flora | Centenary Stadium, Ta' Qali |
| 18:00 (19:00 EEST) | | Report | 25' Zenjov; 33' Sappinen; 87' Reinkort | Attendance: 155; Referee: Manfredas Lukjančukas (Lithuania) |

| 21 July 2021 Champions League Q2 | Legia Warsaw (Poland) | 2–1 | (Estonia) Flora | Stadion Wojska Polskiego, Warsaw |
| 21:00 (22:00 EEST) | Kapustka 2'; Lopes 90+1' | Report | 53' Sappinen | Attendance: 16,721; Referee: Vitali Meshkov (Russia) |

| 27 July 2021 Champions League Q2 | Flora (Estonia) | 0–1 | (Poland) Legia Warsaw | A. Le Coq Arena, Tallinn |
| 18:00 (19:00 EEST) | | Report | 67' Lopes | Attendance: 3,691; Referee: Anastasios Papapetrou (Lithuania) |

| 5 August 2021 Europa League Q3 | Omonia (Cyprus) | 1–0 | (Estonia) Flora | GSP Stadium, Strovolos |
| 18:00 (19:00 EEST) | Tzionis 12' | Report | | Attendance: 8,033; Referee: Radu Petrescu (Romania) |

| 10 August 2021 Europa League Q3 | Flora (Estonia) | 2–1 (a.e.t.) (4–5 p) | (Cyprus) Omonia | A. Le Coq Arena, Tallinn |
| 18:00 (19:00 EEST) | Sappinen 48', 88' | Report | 43' Kakoullis | Attendance: 1,560; Referee: Ivan Kružliak (Slovakia) |

| 19 August 2021 Conference League PO | Flora (Estonia) | 4–2 | (Republic of Ireland) Shamrock Rovers | A. Le Coq Arena, Tallinn |
| 18:00 (19:00 EEST) | Zenjov 13'; Miller 27', 87'; Sappinen 76' | Report | 44' Burke; 86' Scales | Attendance: 1,129; Referee: Yevhen Aranovskyi (Ukraine) |

| 26 August 2021 Conference League PO | Shamrock Rovers (Republic of Ireland) | 0–1 | (Estonia) Flora | Tallaght Stadium, Dublin |
| 21:00 | | Report | 57' Sappinen | Attendance: 3,500; Referee: Tamás Bognár (Hungary) |

| 16 September 2021 Conference League GS | Flora (Estonia) | 0–1 | (Belgium) Gent | A. Le Coq Arena, Tallinn |
| 18:45 (19:45 EEST) | | Report | 54' Lemajić | Attendance: 2,666; Referee: Trustin Farrugia Cann (Malta) |

| 30 September 2021 Conference League GS | Partizan (Serbia) | 2–0 | (Estonia) Flora | Partizan Stadium, Belgrade |
| 18:45 | Marković 20', 42' | Report | | Attendance: 4,845; Referee: Julian Weinberger (Austria) |

| 21 October 2021 Conference League GS | Anorthosis Famagusta (Cyprus) | 2–2 | (Estonia) Flora | GSP Stadium, Nicosia |
| 18:45 (19:45 EEST) | Deletić 25'; Popović 28' | Report | 38', 80' Sappinen | Attendance: 4,322; Referee: István Vad (Hungary) |

| 4 November 2021 Conference League GS | Flora (Estonia) | 2–2 | (Cyprus) Anorthosis Famagusta | A. Le Coq Arena, Tallinn |
| 16:30 (17:30 EET) | Sappinen 55'; Zenjov 58' | Report | 29' Christofi; 33' Popović | Attendance: 2,023; Referee: Kári á Høvdanum (Faroe Islands) |

| 25 November 2021 Conference League GS | Flora (Estonia) | 1–0 | (Serbia) Partizan | A. Le Coq Arena, Tallinn |
| 16:30 (17:30 EET) | Miller 44' | Report | | Attendance: 1,503; Referee: Rob Harvey (Republic of Ireland) |

| 9 December 2021 Conference League GS | Gent (Belgium) | v | (Estonia) Flora | Ghelamco Arena, Ghent |
| 18:45 | | Report | | Referee: Kaspar Sjöberg (Sweden) |

Paide Linnameeskond

| 8 July 2021 Conference League Q1 | Paide Linnameeskond (Estonia) | 1–2 | (Poland) Śląsk Wrocław | Pärnu Rannastaadion, Pärnu |
| 20:00 (21:00 EEST) | Golla 77' (o.g.) | Report | Piasecki 67'; Tamás 89' | Attendance: 1,405; Referee: Ashot Ghaltakhchyan (Armenia) |

| 15 July 2021 Conference League Q1 | Śląsk Wrocław (Poland) | 2–0 | (Estonia) Paide Linnameeskond | Stadion Wrocław, Wrocław |
| 21:00 (22:00 EEST) | Janasik 41'; García 66' | Report | | Attendance: 10,657; Referee: Luka Bilbija (Bosnia and Herzegovina) |

Tallinna Levadia

| 8 July 2021 Conference League Q1 | Levadia (Estonia) | 3–1 | (Gibraltar) St Joseph's | A. Le Coq Arena, Tallinn |
| 19:30 (20:30 EEST) | Beglarishvili 2'; Agyiri 9'; Putinčanin 72' (pen.) | Report | Pecci 74' | Attendance: 1,076; Referee: Snir Levy (Israel) |

| 15 July 2021 Conference League Q1 | St Joseph's (Gibraltar) | 1–1 | (Estonia) Levadia | Victoria Stadium, Gibraltar, Gibraltar |
| 18:30 (19:30 EEST) | Juanfri 19' | Report | Beglarishvili 65' | Attendance: 285; Referee: Hugo Miguel (Portugal) |

| 15 July 2021 Conference League Q2 | Dundalk (Republic of Ireland) | 2–2 | (Estonia) Levadia | Tallaght Stadium, Dublin |
| 21:00 | Patching 3'; McMillan 27' | Report | Vaštšuk 2', 19' | Attendance: 880; Referee: Miroslav Zelinka (Czechia) |

| 29 July 2021 Conference League Q2 | Levadia (Estonia) | 1–2 | (Republic of Ireland) Dundalk | A. Le Coq Arena, Tallinn |
| 18:30 (19:30 EEST) | Agyiri 17' | Report | McMillan 44'; Patching 90+2' | Attendance: 1,875; Referee: Thorvaldur Árnason (Iceland) |

== Notable transfers ==
=== Inside Meistriliiga ===
Listed are only players, who have played at least one game for the Estonian national team.

| Name | Pos. | Age | From | To | Date | Notes |
|---|---|---|---|---|---|---|
| Zakaria Beglarishvili^{1} | MF | 30 | (Finland) KTP | Tallinna Levadia | 01.01 | Contract until 2023 |
| Taijo Teniste | DF | 31 | (Norway) Brann | Tartu Tammeka | 01.01 | Contract until 2023 |
| Andreas Raudsepp | DF | 27 | Nõmme Kalju | free agent | 01.01 | |
| Sören Kaldma | DF | 24 | Kuressaare | free agent | 01.01 | On a break from football |
| Hindrek Ojamaa | DF | 25 | (Finland) KTP | Paide Linnameeskond | 03.01 | |
| Mihkel Aksalu | GK | 36 | free agent | Paide Linnameeskond | 04.01 | Contract until 2022 |
| Marek Kaljumäe | MF | 29 | Tallinna Kalev | Pärnu Vaprus | 06.01 | |
| Henrik Ojamaa | FW | 29 | (Poland) Widzew Łódź | Tallinna Flora | 07.01 | Contract until 2024 |
| Pavel Dõmov | MF | 27 | Tallinna Flora | Tallinna Legion | 13.01 | |
| Dmitri Kruglov | DF | 36 | Tallinna Levadia | Maardu Linnameeskond | 19.01 | |
| Sergei Zenjov | FW | 31 | (Kazakhstan) Shakhter Karagandy | Tallinna Flora | 20.01 | Contract until 2023 |
| Pavel Marin | FW | 25 | Viljandi Tulevik | Nõmme Kalju | 01.02 | Contract until 2023 |
| Frank Liivak | FW | 24 | Tallinna Flora | Tallinna Levadia | 01.01 | Contract until 2023 |
| Sergei Lepmets | GK | 33 | free agent | Nõmme Kalju | 02.02 | |
| Hannes Anier | FW | 28 | Tallinna Kalev | Tallinna Levadia | 03.02 | Contract until 2022 |
| Ilja Antonov | MF | 28 | Ararat-Armenia | Tallinna Levadia | 04.02 | Contract until 2023 |
| Sander Puri | MF | 32 | Nõmme Kalju | Tallinna Legion | 07.02 | |
| Ragnar Klavan | DF | 35 | (Italy) Cagliari | Paide Linnameeskond | 01.07 | Contract until 2023 |
| Maksim Gussev | FW | 26 | Tallinna Legion free agent | free agent Nõmme Kalju | 07.06; 15.07 | Contract terminated Contract until 2022 |
| Karl Mööl | MF | 29 | Paide Linnameeskond | Kuressaare | 24.07 | Loan until 2022 |

^{1} Zakaria Beglarishvili has represented Georgia.

=== Outside Meistriliiga ===
Listed are all Estonian players, who have joined a foreign team.

| Name | Pos. | Age | From | To | Date | Notes |
|---|---|---|---|---|---|---|
| Vladislav Kreida | MF | 21 | Tallinna Flora | (Sweden) Helsingborg | 17.01 | On loan until 2022 |
| Sten Jakob Viidas | FW | 17 | Tabasalu | (Portugal) Vitória U19 | 06.02 | Contract until 2024 |
| Vlasiy Sinyavskiy | FW | 24 | Tallinna Flora | (Czech Republic) Karvina | 08.02 | Contract until June 2022 |
| Denis Vnukov | MF | 29 | Tallinna Legion | (Iceland) Fjardabyggdar | 22.02 | Contract until 2022 |
| Andreas Vaher | DF | 16 | Nõmme United | (Italy) SPAL U17 | 22.02 | |
| Mihkel Ainsalu | MF | 24 | (Ukraine) Lviv | (Denmark) Helsingør | 25.02 | Contract until July 2021 |
| Kristoffer Grauberg Lepik | FW | 20 | (Sweden) Brommapojkarna | (Sweden) Akropolis | 24.02 | On loan until 2022 |
| Aleksei Matrossov | GK | 29 | Narva Trans | (Tajikistan) Khujand | 26.02 | |
| Artjom Dmitrijev | MF | 32 | (Kazakhstan) Okzhetpes | (Kazakhstan) Zhetysu | 08.03 | |
| Kirill Antonov | DF | 18 | Nõmme Kalju | (United States) Orange County | 13.05 | |
| Andreas Vaikla | GK | 24 | Narva Trans | (Canada) Toronto II | 18.05 | |
| Nikita Baranov | DF | 28 | (Cyprus) Karmiotissa | (Malta) Ħamrun Spartans | 25.05 | Contract until June 2023 |
| Joonas Tamm | DF | 29 | (Ukraine) Desna Chernihiv | (Ukraine) Vorskla Poltava | 28.05 | |
| Kevin Rääbis | FW | 27 | (Germany) Donaustauf | (Germany) Wacker 50 Neutraubling | 09.07 | |
| Kirill Antonov | DF | 18 | (United States) Orange County | free agent | 22.07 | Contract terminated |
| Artur Pikk | DF | 28 | (Hungary) Diósgyőri | (Latvia) RFS | 24.07 | |
| Karol Mets | DF | 28 | (Saudi Arabia) Ettifaq | free agent | 01.08 | Contract terminated |
| Erik Sorga | FW | 22 | (United States) D.C. United | (Netherlands) VVV-Venlo | 12.08 | On loan until 2022 |
| Georgi Tunjov | MF | 20 | (Italy) S.P.A.L. | (Italy) Carrarese Calcio | 27.08 | On loan |
| Nikita Baranov | DF | 29 | (Malta) Ħamrun Spartans | (Armenia) Pyunik | 31.08 | |
| Henri Järvelaid | DF | 22 | (Denmark) Vendsyssel | (Norway) Sogndal | 01.09 | |
| Karel Mustmaa | DF | 16 | Harju Laagri | (Portugal) Benfica U17 | 01.09 | Contract until 2024 |
| Mattias Käit | MF | 23 | (Slovenia) Domžale | free agent | 01.09 | Contract terminated |

=== Foreign players ===
Listed are all foreign players that have joined or left Meistriliiga. Players, whose background is red, changed their teams more than once.

| Name | Pos. | Age | From | To | Date | Notes |
|---|---|---|---|---|---|---|
| (Mali) Sadio Tounkara | FW | 28 | Narva Trans | free agent ^{2} | 01.01 | Contract ended |
| (Ghana) Ofosu Appiah | DF | 31 | Narva Trans | free agent ^{9} | 01.01 | Contract ended |
| (Brazil) Pedro Victor | DF | 27 | Nõmme Kalju | free agent | 01.01 | Contract ended |
| (Ukraine) Ivan Lobay | MF | 24 | Nõmme Kalju | free agent ^{1} | 01.01 | Contract ended |
| (Spain) Mikel Gurrutxaga | DF | 24 | Paide Linnameeskond | free agent ^{8} | 01.01 | Contract ended |
| (Georgia (country)) Giorgi Ghvinashvili | MF | 23 | Tallinna Legion | free agent | 01.01 | Contract ended |
| (Russia) Semen Belyakov | FW | 22 | Tallinna Legion | free agent ^{7} | 01.01 | Contract ended |
| (Serbia) Nemanja Lakić-Pešić | DF | 29 | Tallinna Levadia | free agent ^{3} | 01.01^{[?]} | Contract ended |
| (Ivory Coast) Manucho | FW | 30 | Tallinna Levadia | free agent ^{4} | 01.01 | Contract ended |
| (Cameroon) Marcelin Gando | FW | 23 | Tallinna Levadia | free agent ^{5} | 01.01 | Contract ended |
| (Ukraine) Yuriy Kolomoyets | FW | 30 | Tallinna Levadia | free agent ^{6} | 01.01 | Contract ended |
| (Russia) Mikhail Slashchev | DF | 23 | Tartu Tammeka | free agent | 01.01 | Contract ended |
| (England) Jude Barrow | MF | 20 | Viljandi Tulevik | free agent | 01.01^{[?]} | Contract ended |
| (Austria) Marco Budic | DF | 20 | Viljandi Tulevik | free agent ^{10} | 01.01 | Contract ended |
| (Poland) Jeremiah Dabrowski | DF | 25 | Viljandi Tulevik | free agent | 01.01^{[?]} | Contract ended |
| (Serbia) Milijan Ilić | DF | 27 | (Serbia) Indija | Tallinna Levadia | 08.01 | Contract until 2023 |
| (Ghana) Abdul Yusif | DF | 19 | (Ghana) Densu Rovers | Paide Linnameeskond | 12.01 | Contract until 2024 |
| (Georgia (country)) Anton Tolordava | DF | 24 | (Georgia (country)) Telavi | Tallinna Levadia | 12.01 | Contract until 2023 |
| (The Gambia) Muhammed Sanneh | DF | 20 | Paide Linnameeskond | (Czech Republic) Banik Ostrava | 13.01 | On loan until June 2021 |
| (Ukraine) Volodymyr Bayenko | DF | 30 | (Ukraine) Vorskla Poltava | Tallinna Levadia | 26.01 | Contract until 2023 |
| (Serbia) Luka Lukovic | DF | 19 | (Serbia) Sinđelić Beograd | Tallinna Levadia | 27.01 | Contract until 2024 |
| (Australia) Amar Abdallah | FW | 21 | (Australia) Heidelberg United | Tallinna Levadia | 28.01 | Contract until 2024 |
| (Ghana) Ernest Agyiri | MF | 22 | free agent | Tallinna Levadia | 31.01 | Contract until 2023 |
| (Lithuania) Sigitas Olberkis | DF | 23 | (Republic of Ireland) Sligo Rovers | Tallinna Legion | 02.02 | |
| (North Macedonia) Strahinja Krstevski | FW | 23 | (Serbia) Red Star Belgrade II | Tallinna Levadia | 02.02 | Contract until 2022 |
| (Tajikistan) Tabrezi Davlatmir | DF | 22 | (Tajikistan) Istiklol | Narva Trans | 09.02 | Contract until 2022 |
| (Russia) Mikhail Belov | MF | 28 | (Russia) Lada Dimitrovgrad | Narva Trans | 12.02 | |
| (Russia) Nikolay Vdovichenko | FW | 31 | (Moldova) Codru Lozova | Narva Trans | 12.02 | |
| (Russia) Nikita Zagrebelnyi | MF | 24 | (Russia) Strela Voronezh | Narva Trans | 12.02 | |
| (Russia) Vitali Kalenkovich | MF | 27 | free agent | Narva Trans | 13.02 | |
| (Guinea) Sékou Camara | FW | 23 | (Switzerland) Wil | Paide Linnameeskond | 24.02 | Contract until June 2023 |
| (Albania) Kristi Marku | DF | 25 | free agent | Narva Trans | 26.02 | Contract until 2022 |
| (Uganda) Edrisa Lubega | FW | 22 | Paide Linnameeskond | (Czech Republic) Příbram | 26.02 | On loan until June 2022 |
| (Nigeria) Ganiu Ogungbe | DF | 28 | (Slovenia) Krško | Viljandi Tulevik | 27.02 | |
| (Canada) Carson Buschman-Dormond | FW | 18 | (Canada) Whitecaps Academy | Viljandi Tulevik | 27.02 | |
| (Nigeria) Kazeem Bolaji | MF | 18 | (Nigeria) Team360 | Viljandi Tulevik | 27.02 | |
| (Cameroon) Arcenciel Mintongo | MF | 18 | (Cameroon) Nkufo Academy | Viljandi Tulevik | 27.02 | |
| (Canada) Tomi Fagbongbe | MF | 22 | (Canada) Vancouver Whitecaps U23 | Viljandi Tulevik | 27.02 | |
| (Greece) Giannis Tsivelekidis | DF | 21 | (Slovenia) Fužinar | Nõmme Kalju | 01.03 | Contract until 2024 |
| (Ghana) Ishaku Konda | DF | 21 | (Ghana) Asokwa Deportivo | Paide Linnameeskond | 03.03 | |
| (Ukraine) Ihor Koshman | MF | 25 | (Ukraine) Lviv | Tallinna Legion | 08.03 | |
| (Latvia) Ivans Baturins | GK | 23 | (Latvia) Tukums 2000 | Tallinna Legion | 08.03 | |
| (Belarus) Mikhail Babichev | MF | 26 | (Latvia) RFS | Nõmme Kalju | 09.03 | Contract until 2024 |
| (Nigeria) Ridwan Babatunde | DF | 19 | (Portugal) Leixões U23 | Viljandi Tulevik | 10.03 | |
| (Uzbekistan) Abubakir Muydinov | DF | 20 | free agent | Viljandi Tulevik | 03.04 | |
| (Brazil) Odilávio | FW | 24 | Nõmme Kalju | free agent ^{11} | 24.05 | Contract terminated |
| (Ukraine) Vladyslav Veremeyev | DF | 22 | Nõmme Kalju | free agent | 24.05 | |
| (Russia) Nikolay Vdovichenko | FW | 31 | Narva Trans | free agent | 07.06 | Contract terminated |
| (The Gambia) Muhammed Sanneh | DF | 21 | Paide Linnameeskond | (Czech Republic) Banik Ostrava | 07.06 | Permanent transfer |
| (Canada) Tomi Fagbongbe | MF | 22 | Viljandi Tulevik | free agent | 09.06 | Contract terminated |
| (Ukraine) Volodymyr Bayenko | DF | 31 | Tallinna Levadia | retired | 14.06 | Retired |
| (Serbia) Marko Putinčanin | MF | 33 | (Uzbekistan) Navbahor Namangan | Tallinna Levadia | 17.06 | Contract until 2023 |
| (Italy) Maximiliano Ugge | DF | 30 | (Italy) Gubbio 1910 | Tallinna Levadia | 22.06 | Contract until 2023 |
| (Canada) Carson Buschman-Dormond | FW | 18 | Viljandi Tulevik | (Switzerland) Zürich II | 24.06 | On loan until July 2023 |
| (Georgia (country)) Anton Tolordava | DF | 24 | Tallinna Levadia | free agent | 30.06 | Contract terminated |
| (Lithuania) Edgaras Žarskis | DF | 27 | (Poland) Puszcza Niepołomice | Narva Trans | 03.07 | |
| (Russia) Igor Dudarev | DF | 27 | Tartu Tammeka | (Malta) Gudja United | 13.07 | Contract until July 2022 |
| (Serbia) Milan Mitrović | DF | 33 | free agent | Tallinna Levadia | 16.07 | Contract until 2022 |
| (Uganda) Edrisa Lubega | FW | 23 | (Czech Republic) Příbram | Paide Linnameeskond | 17.07 | Contract terminated |
| (Uganda) Edrisa Lubega | FW | 23 | Paide Linnameeskond | (Portugal) Estrela da Amadora | 17.07 | On loan until July 2022 |
| (North Macedonia) Strahinja Krstevski | FW | 24 | Tallinna Levadia | free agent | 21.07 | Contract terminated |
| (Ukraine) Ihor Zhurakhovskyi | MF | 26 | Tallinna Levadia | free agent | 21.07 | Contract terminated |
| (Nigeria) Paul Odunayo Aderibigbe | FW | 19 | free agent | Viljandi Tulevik | 27.07 | |
| (Russia) Amir Natkho | MF | 25 | Nõmme Kalju | Tallinna Levadia | 30.07 | Contract until July 2024 |
| (Albania) Kristi Marku | DF | 26 | Narva Trans | free agent | 30.07 | Contract terminated |

^{1} Ivan Lobay joined Ukrainian team Lviv on 10 January.
^{2} Sadio Tounkara joined Azerbaijani team Kesla on 11 January.
^{3} Nemanja Lakić-Pešić joined Serbian team Bačka on 14 January.
^{4} Manucho joined Saudi Arabian team Al-Kawkab on 26 January.
^{5} Marcelin Gando joined Cypriot team Enosis Neon Paralimni on 2 February.
^{6} Yuriy Kolomoyets joined Tajik team Istiklol on 2 February.
^{7} Semen Belyakov joined Russian team Krasny on 17 February.
^{8} Mikel Gurrutxaga joined Lithuanian team Sūduva on 3 March.
^{9} Ofosu Appiah joined Latvian team Noah Jurmala on 23 April.
^{10} Marko Budic joined Croatian team Ponikve on 3 March.
^{11} Odilavio joined Brazilian team Retrô Brasil on 24 May.

=== Retired players ===
Listed are all players, whose last club was a foreign team or a club that plays in Meistriliiga.

| Name | Pos. | Age | Last club | Date | Notes |
|---|---|---|---|---|---|
| Enar Jääger | DF | 36 | Tallinna Flora | 01.01 | |
| Elari Valmas | DF | 32 | Kuressaare | 01.01 | |
| Ander Paabut | FW | 30 | Pärnu Vaprus | 01.01 | Coach at Pärnu Vaprus |

=== Managerial changes ===
Listed are all managers, who started coaching the national teams or in the top three divisions (Meistriliiga, Esiliiga, Esiliiga B).

| Team | Outgoing manager | Manner of departure | Date of vacancy | Incoming manager | Date of appointment |
|---|---|---|---|---|---|
| Estonia | (Estonia) Karel Voolaid | End of contract | 31 December 2020 | (Switzerland) Thomas Häberli | 5 January 2021 |
| Viljandi Tulevik | (Estonia) Sander Post | Resigned | 6 December 2020 | (Estonia) Jaanus Reitel | 6 December 2020 |
| Nõmme Kalju | (Estonia) Marko Kristal | Resigned | 7 December 2020 | (Russia) Sergei Frantsev | 7 December 2020 |
| Tallinna Kalev U21 | (Estonia) Daniel Meijel | Mutual consent | 15 December 2020 | (Estonia) Ats Purje | 15 December 2020 |
| Narva Trans | (Russia) Oleg Kurotškin | End of contract | 6 December 2020 | (Russia) Igor Pyvin | 3 January 2021 |
| Nõmme Kalju U21 | (Estonia) Tarmo Neemelo | Mutual consent | 18 January 2021 | (Estonia) Marko Kristal | 18 January 2021 |
| Tartu Welco | (Estonia) Janar Sagim | Resigned | 22 January 2021 | (Estonia) Meelis Eelmäe | 25 January 2021 |
| Estonia U21 | (Estonia) Igor Prins | End of contract | 31 December 2020 | (Ukraine) Roman Kozhukhovskyi | 5 February 2021 |
| Tallinna Kalev | (Latvia) Dmitrijs Kalašnikovs | Contract ended | 30 November 2020 | (Estonia) Daniel Meijel (Estonia) Aivar Anniste | 1 March 2021 |

== See also ==
- 2020 Meistriliiga
- 2020-21 Estonian Cup
- List of Estonian football transfers winter 2020-21
