= 2018 in Estonian football =

Football in Estonia
- Season: 2018

This page summarizes 2018 in Estonian football.

== National teams ==
The home team or the team that is designated as the home team is listed in the left column; the away team is in the right column.

Win Draw Loss

=== Senior ===
Friendly matches

7 January 2018	Sweden	1–1	Estonia	Abu Dhabi, United Arab Emirates
21:15 UTC+04	Holmberg 79'	(Report)	Anier 58'	Stadium: Zayed Sports City Stadium; Attendance: 200; Referee: Antti Munukka

24 March 2018	Armenia	0–0	Estonia	Yerevan, Armenia
		(Report)		Stadium: Vazgen Sargsyan Republican Stadium; Attendance: 3,600; Referee: George Vadachkoria

27 March 2018	Georgia	2–0	Estonia	Tbilisi, Georgia
	Tabidze 6'; Qazaishvili 35'	(Report)		Stadium: Mikheil Meskhi Stadium; Attendance: 21,954; Referee: Alexey Kulbakov

9 June 2018	Estonia	1–3	Morocco	Tallinn, Estonia
19:00 UTC+03	Purje 75'	(Report)	Belhanda 11'; Ziyech 38' (pen.); En-Nesyri 72'	Stadium: A. Le Coq Arena; Attendance: 4, 754; Referee: Marius Avram

2018–19 UEFA Nations League

8 September 2018 UEFA NL C	Estonia	0-1	Greece	Tallinn, Estonia
21:45 UTC+03		(Report)	Fortounis 14'	Stadium: A. Le Coq Arena; Attendance: 5,567; Referee: Serdar Gözübüyük

11 September 2018 UEFA NL C	Finland	1-0	Estonia	Turku, Finland
21:45 UTC+03	Pukki 12'	(Report)		Stadium: Veritas Stadion; Attendance: 4,632; Referee: Orel Grinfeld

12 October 2018 UEFA NL C	Estonia	0-1	Finland	Tallinn, Estonia
21:45 UTC+03		(Report)	Pukki 90'	Stadium: A. Le Coq Arena; Attendance: 8,097; Referee: Craig Pawson

15 October 2018 UEFA NL C	Estonia	3-3	Hungary	Tallinn, Estonia
21:45 UTC+03	Luts 20'; Pátkai 70' (o.g.); Anier 79'	(Report)	Nagy 24'; Szalai 54', 81'	Stadium: A. Le Coq Arena; Attendance: 3,043; Referee: Halis Ozkahya

15 November 2018 UEFA NL C	Hungary	2-0	Estonia	Budapest, Hungary
21:45 UTC+03	Orban 8'; Szalai 69'	Report		Stadium: Groupama Arena; Referee: Enea Jorgji (Albania)

18 November 2018 UEFA NL C	Greece	0-1	Estonia	Athens, Greece
21:45 UTC+03		Report	Lambropoulos 44' (o.g.)	Stadium: Olympic Stadium; Referee: Yevhen Aranovskyi (Ukraine)

2018 Baltic Cup

30 May 2018	Estonia	2–0	Lithuania	Rakvere, Estonia
19:00 UTC+03	Ojamaa 23'; Käit 42'	(Report)		Stadium: Rakvere linnastaadion Attendance: 1, 460; Referee: Andris Treimanis

2 June 2018	Latvia	1–0	Estonia	Riga, Latvia
18:00 UTC+03	Ikaunieks 70'	(Report)		Stadium: Daugava Stadium; Attendance: 4, 251; Referee: Manfredas Lukjancukas

=== Youth ===
U23

10 October 2018 Friendly	England C	1–0	Estonia	London, England
19:45 (UTC+1)	Pavey 65' (pen.)	Report		Stadium: Brisbane Road; Attendance: 635

U21

27 March 2018 2019 Euro qualification	Spain	3–1	Estonia	Ponferrada, Spain
19:30 (UTC+2)	Fabián 8'; Mayoral 37', 51'	Report	Sinyavskiy 59'	Stadium: Estadio El Toralín; Referee: Dumitru Muntean (Moldova)

29 May 2018 Baltic Cup	Estonia	1–1	Lithuania	Pärnu, Estonia
19:00 (UTC+3)	Riiberg 78' (pen.)	Report	Sadauskas 74'	Stadium: Pärnu Rannastaadion; Attendance: 217; Referee: Roomer Tarajev (Estonia)

1 June 2018 Baltic Cup	Latvia	2–0	Estonia	Jūrmala, Latvia
18:00 (UTC+3)	Fjodorovs 25'; Šibass 84'	Report		Stadium: Sloka Stadium; Referee: Aleksandrs Anufrijevs (Latvia)

6 September 2018 2019 Euro qualification	Iceland	5–2	Estonia	Kópavogur, Iceland
16:45 (UTC±0)	Karlsson 19', 22'; Friðjónsson 45+3'; Sigurðsson 53'; Guðmundsson 64'	Report	Liivak 61' (pen.); Kaldma 68'	Stadium: Kópavogsvöllur; Referee: Rahim Hasanov (Azerbaijan)

U19

6 June 2018 Baltic Cup	Estonia	0–4	Latvia	Šiauliai, Lithuania
12:30 (UTC+3)		Report	Toniševs 3'; Kokins 18', 62'; Zelenkovs 68'	Stadium: Šiauliai Arena; Attendance: 30; Referee: Mindaugas Jackus

7 June 2018 Baltic Cup	Finland	3–0	Estonia	Lithuania
13:00 (UTC+3)		Report		Attendance: 50

9 June 2018 Baltic Cup	Estonia	0–5	Lithuania	Lithuania
11:00 (UTC+3)		Report		Attendance: 100; Referee: Tanel Üprus

10 October 2018 2019 Euro qualification	Italy	3–0	Estonia	Rakvere, Estonia
14:00 (15:00 EEST)	Raspadori 11', 87'; Portanova 25'	(Report)		Stadium: Rakvere Linnastaadion; Referee: Pavel Orel (Czech Republic)

13 October 2018 2019 Euro qualification	Denmark	3–0	Estonia	Rakvere, Estonia
14:00 (15:00 EEST)	Madsen 48' (pen.); Jensen 78'; Kaastrup 87'	(Report)		Stadium: Rakvere Linnastaadion; Referee: Pavel Orel (Czech Republic)

16 October 2018 2019 Euro qualification	Estonia	0–0	Finland	Rakvere, Estonia
14:00 (15:00 EEST)		(Report)		Stadium: Rakvere Linnastaadion

U17

26 June 2018 Baltic Cup	Estonia	0–1	Latvia	Klaipėda, Lithuania
13:00 (UTC+3)		Report		Attendance: 42; Referee: Lukas Jonušis

27 June 2018 Baltic Cup	Finland	2–1	Estonia	Lithuania
13:00 (UTC+3)		Report		Attendance: 35; Referee: Viyunas Vasiliauskas

29 June 2018 Baltic Cup	Estonia	2–1	Lithuania	Lithuania
11:00 (UTC+3)		Report		Attendance: 50; Referee: Donatas Rumšas

24 October 2018 2019 Euro qualification	Russia	6–0	Estonia	Skive Stadion, Skive
18:00	Kotin 46'; Schetinin 58', 76' (pen.), 87', 90+1'; Shapovalov 62'	Report		Referee: Christopher Jaeger (Austria)

27 October 2018 2019 Euro qualification	Denmark	5–2	Estonia	Viborg Stadium, Viborg
18:00	Crone 11' (pen.), 44', 86'; Haahr 17'; Simsir 60'	Report	Šapovalov 45+1'; Obbekjær 89' (o.g.)	Referee: Milovan Milačić (Montenegro)

30 October 2018 2019 Euro qualification	Estonia	v	Georgia	Vildbjerg Stadion, Vildbjerg
13:00		Report

== County competition ==
Estonian Football Association together with the provincial sport associations and local promoters arrange the Estonian County Competition, where 15 counties and the capital Tallinn have their football teams face each other. All teams will play each other twice (home and away). If a game is drawn, a winner will be founded with penalties, but a draw is put into the protocol and both teams get one point added to the table. Every year every team plays one game. The competition was started in 2012.

=== Results ===
3 June 2018	Jõgevamaa	w/o	Harjumaa	Jõgeva, Jõgevamaa
16:00 UTC+03		(Report)		Stadium: Vaimastvere Arena; Attendance: 0 Referee: Maikel Mikson

3 June 2018	Hiiumaa	2–0	Valgamaa	Kärdla, Hiiumaa
16:00 UTC+03	Georg Linkov 82'; Kersten Lõppe 90+2'	(Report)		Stadium: Kärdla linnastaadion Attendance: 26; Referee: Triinu Laos

3 June 2018	Põlvamaa	w/o	Läänemaa	Tilsi, Põlvamaa
16:00 UTC+03		(Report)		Stadium: Tilsi staadion Attendance: 0 Referee: Siim Rinken

3 June 2018	Ida-Virumaa	0–6	Tallinn	Narva, Ida-Virumaa
16:00 UTC+03		(Report)	Gregor Wahl 10', 71'; Juhan Jograf Siim 38'; Marten Niilop 63'; Erik Kruglov 78' (o.g.); Aleksandr Ivanjušin 90+3' (o.g.)	Stadium: Narva Kreenholmi Stadium; Attendance: 20; Referee: Kevin Kaivoja

3 June 2018	Saaremaa	0–2	Pärnumaa	Kuressaare, Saaremaa
16:00 UTC+03		(Report)	Risto Pärnat 11'; Reimo Madisoo 64'	Stadium: Kuressaare linnastaadion Attendance: 38; Referee: Tanel Üprus

3 June 2018	Järvamaa	5–1	Võrumaa	Paide, Järvamaa
16:00 UTC+03	Lauri Reinpõld 8'; Jaagup Luts 12'; Uku Lattik 16'; Radmar Arula 61'; Kristo Kiik 74'	(Report)	Eduard Desjatski 64' (pen.)	Stadium: Paide linnastaadion Attendance: 167; Referee: Revo Sirel

3 June 2018	Tartumaa	6–0	Lääme-Virumaa	Tartu, Tartumaa
16:00 UTC+03	Rasmus Tomson 31'; Mikk Valtna 36'; Jan Hendrik Kangur 45+1' (o.g.); Edgar Leht 48'; Mario Hansi 57'; Kristjan Tiirik 65'	(Report)		Stadium: Sepa kunstmurustaadion Attendance: 62; Referee: Siim Rinken

3 June 2018	Viljandimaa	4–3	Raplamaa	Viljandi, Viljandimaa
19:00 UTC+03	Jarmo Ahjupera 47'; Ivar Sova 52'; Markel Utsal 72'; Rasmus Alles 83'	(Report)	Taavi Laurits 17', 55'; Raimond Stepanjuga 66'	Stadium: Viljandi linnastaadion Attendance: 55; Referee: Andrei Kahru

== Men's football ==
=== Promotion and relegation ===
League	Promoted to league	Relegated from league
Meistriliiga	Tallinna Kalev; Kuressaare	Sillamäe; FCI Tallinn
Esiliiga	Kalju U21; Keila; Tallinna Kalev U21	FCI Tallinn U21
Esiliiga B	Legion; Nõmme United; Helios; Pärnu JK; Flora U19; Ajax	Sillamäe U21; Joker; Viimsi
II Liiga	Põhja-Tallinna JK Volta; Tartu JK Welco II; Paide Linnameeskond III; Pärnu JK Poseidon; JK Tallinna Kalev III; Läänemaa JK; Tartu JK Tammeka III	Tartu FC Merkuur; Tallinna FC Levadia III; Saue JK Laagri; SK Imavere; Viimsi JK II
III Liiga	Tallinna FC TransferWise; Tallinna FC Zapoos; Valga FC Warrior; Võru FC Helios II; FC Elva II; Põlva FC Lootos; Anija JK; Kadrina SK; Rakvere JK Tarvas II; Haapsalu JK; Kohila Püsivus; Pärnu JK Poseidon II; Keila JK II; Vändra JK Vaprus II	Pirita JK Reliikvia; FC Tartu; SK Tääksi; Tartu Ülikool Fauna; Navi Vutiselts; Raasiku FC Joker II; Kuusalu JK Rada; Kristiine JK; FC Lelle; Pakri SK Alexela; Raplamaa JK II
IV Liiga		

1. Club did not enter the Championship

=== Meistriliiga ===
Pos	Team	Pld	W	D	L	GF	GA	GD	Pts	Qualification or relegation
1	Nõmme Kalju (C)	36	25	11	0	114	32	+82	86	Qualification for the Champions League first qualifying round
2	FCI Levadia	36	26	6	4	109	26	+83	84	Qualification for the Europa League first qualifying round (Note: Narva Trans qualified for the Europa League since they won 2018–19 Estonian Cup.)
3	Flora	36	25	8	3	116	32	+84	83	Qualification for the Europa League first qualifying round
4	Narva Trans	36	18	7	11	76	57	+19	61	Qualification for the Europa League first qualifying round
5	Paide Linnameeskond	36	14	9	13	64	74	−10	51	
6	Tammeka	36	14	7	15	56	58	−2	49	
7	Tulevik	36	8	5	23	37	100	−63	29	
8	Tallinna Kalev	36	7	7	22	54	68	−14	28	
9	Kuressaare (O)	36	6	3	27	34	115	−81	21	Qualification for the Relegation play-offs
10	Vaprus (R)	36	2	7	27	25	123	−98	13	Relegation to the Esiliiga

Source: Estonian Football Association (in Estonian), UEFA, Soccerway
Rules for classification: 1) Points; 2) Less matches awarded against; 3) Head-to-head points; 4) Head-to-head goal difference; 5) Matches won; 6) Goal difference; 7) Goals scored; 8) Away goals scored; 9) Fairplay ranking.
(C) Champions; (O) Play-off winners; (R) Relegated

=== Esiliiga ===
Pos	Team	Pld	W	D	L	GF	GA	GD	Pts	Promotion, qualification or relegation
1	Maardu Linnameeskond (C, P)	36	29	1	6	126	41	+85	88	Promotion to the Meistriliiga
2	Flora U21 (Note: Reserve teams are ineligible for promotion.)	36	21	8	7	115	31	+84	71	
3	FCI Levadia U21	36	18	7	11	67	56	+11	61	
4	Elva (Q)	36	15	10	11	51	66	−15	55	Qualification for promotion play-offs
5	Tarvas	36	14	10	12	62	60	+2	52	
6	Welco	36	12	6	18	44	78	−34	42	
7	Santos (Note: Santos withdrew from the Esiliiga and were relegated to the II liiga.) (R)	36	11	8	17	47	68	−21	41	Relegation to II liiga
8	Tallinna Kalev U21	36	10	9	17	37	52	−15	39	
9	Keila (R)	36	10	5	21	41	88	−47	35	Qualification for relegation play-offs
10	Nõmme Kalju U21 (R)	36	5	6	25	37	89	−52	21	Relegation to Esiliiga B

Source: Soccerway (in English), Esiliiga (in Estonian)
Rules for classification: 1) Points; 2) Less matches awarded against; 3) Head-to-head points; 4) Head-to-head goal difference; 5) Matches won; 6) Goal difference; 7) Goals scored; 8) Away goals scored; 9) Fairplay ranking.
(C) Champions; (P) Promoted; (Q) Qualified for the phase indicated; (R) Relegated

=== Esiliiga B ===
Pos	Team	Pld	W	D	L	GF	GA	GD	Pts	Promotion, qualification or relegation
1	Tallinna Legion (C, P)	36	32	2	2	125	31	+94	98	Promotion to the Esiliiga
2	Tammeka U21 (P)	36	22	6	8	108	40	+68	72	Promotion to the Esiliiga
3	Kohtla-Järve Järve (P)	36	21	6	9	80	39	+41	69	Qualification for promotion play-offs
4	Pärnu JK	36	18	7	11	80	51	+29	61	
5	Nõmme United	36	17	9	10	100	57	+43	60	
6	Võru Helios	36	15	9	12	81	66	+15	54	
7	Vändra Vaprus	36	11	5	20	61	96	−35	38	
8	Paide U21 (Note: Paide escaped relegation due to vacant league spot after Tartu Santos from 2018 Esiliiga were relegated down two league levels.)	36	8	4	24	45	94	−49	28	
9	Lasnamäe Ajax (R)	36	4	4	28	35	135	−100	16	Qualification for relegation play-offs
10	Flora U19 (Note: Reserve teams are ineligible for promotion.) (R)	36	4	4	28	33	138	−105	16	Relegation to II Liiga

Source: soccerway (in English), Esiliiga B (in Estonian)
Rules for classification: 1) Points; 2) Less matches awarded against; 3) Head-to-head points; 4) Head-to-head goal difference; 5) Matches won; 6) Goal difference; 7) Goals scored; 8) Away goals scored; 9) Fairplay ranking.
(C) Champions; (P) Promoted; (R) Relegated

=== II liiga ===
Group A (North & East)
Pos	Team	Pld	Pts
1	Põhja-Tallinna Volta (C, P)	26	57
2	FCI Tallinn	26	57
3	Sillamäe Kalev	26	56
4	Jõgeva Noorus-96	26	44
5	Raasiku Joker	26	44
6	Narva Trans II	26	39
7	Tallinna Ararat	26	38
8	Kohtla-Järve Järve II	26	34
9	Tartu Welco II	26	32
10	Maardu Linnameeskond II	26	30
11	Tallinna Piraaja	26	29
12	Tartu Tammeka III (O)	26	28
13	Tartu Santos II (R)	26	23
14	Maardu United (D)	26	11

Updated to match(es) played on 28 October 2018. Source:
(C) Champions; (D) Disqualified; (O) Play-off winners; (P) Promoted; (R) Relegated

Group B (South & West)
Pos	Team	Pld	Pts
1	Paide Linnameeskond III (C)	26	71
2	Viimsi (P)	26	65
3	Tabasalu (P)	26	54
4	Pärnu Vaprus II	26	41
5	Läänemaa	26	41
6	Tallinna Legion II	26	37
7	Pärnu Poseidon	26	33
8	Viljandi Tulevik U21	26	30
9	Türi Ganvix	26	30
10	Kuressaare II	26	30
11	Otepää	26	27
12	Tõrva (R)	26	26
13	Tallinna Kalev III (R)	26	25
14	Raplamaa (R)	26	16

Updated to match(es) played on 30 October 2018. Source:
(C) Champions; (P) Promoted; (R) Relegated

=== III liiga ===
Group A (North)
Pos	Team	Pld	Pts
1	Retro (C, P)	22	52
2	Tallinna Zapoos	22	41
3	Harju Laagri	22	41
4	Tallinna Zenit	22	35
5	Tallinna Hell Hunt	22	32
6	Rumori Calcio	22	31
7	Saku Sporting	22	29
8	Tallinna Štrommi	22	27
9	Tallinna Dünamo	22	27
10	Tallinna Eston Villa (O)	22	26
11	Nõmme Kalju III (R)	22	18
12	Tallinna TransferWise (R)	22	15

Updated to match(es) played on 14 October 2018. Source:
(C) Champions; (O) Play-off winners; (P) Promoted; (R) Relegated

Group B (South)
Pos	Team	Pld	Pts
1	Põhja-Sakala (C, P)	22	46
2	Imavere	22	43
3	Tarvastu	22	42
4	Jõgeva Wolves	22	39
5	Vastseliina	22	39
6	Viljandi Tulevik III	22	38
7	Valga Warrior	22	29
8	EMÜ	22	25
9	Elva II	22	24
10	Võru Helios II (O)	22	21
11	Tartu Helios (R)	22	18
12	Põlva Lootos (R)	22	18

Updated to match(es) played on 13 October 2018. Source:
(C) Champions; (O) Play-off winners; (P) Promoted; (R) Relegated

Group C (East)
Pos	Team	Pld	Pts
1	Viimsi II (C, P)	22	56
2	Loo	22	43
3	Lasnamäe Ajax II	22	41
4	Koeru	22	36
5	Augur	22	31
6	Sillamäe	22	30
7	FCI Tallinn II	22	28
8	Anija	22	28
9	Järva-Jaani	22	27
10	Kadrina (O)	22	25
11	Ambla Vallameeskond (R)	22	22
12	Rakvere Tarvas II (R)	22	12

Updated to match(es) played on 13 October 2018. Source:
(C) Champions; (O) Play-off winners; (P) Promoted; (R) Relegated

Group D (West)
Pos	Team	Pld	Pts
1	Kose (C, P)	22	58
2	Põhja-Tallinna Volta II (P)	22	47
3	Saue	22	45
4	Haapsalu	22	35
5	Hiiumaa	22	34
6	Kohila Püsivus	22	33
7	Rummu Dünamo	22	32
8	Kernu Kadakas	22	24
9	Keila II	22	24
10	Pärnu Poseidon II (R)	22	20
11	Lihula (R)	22	16
12	Vändra Vaprus II (R)	22	8

Updated to match(es) played on 14 October 2018. Source:
(C) Champions; (P) Promoted; (R) Relegated

=== IV liiga ===
Group A (North & East)
Pos	Team	Pld	Pts
1	Maarjamäe Igiliikur (C, P)	21	44
2	FC Tallinn (P)	21	43
3	Pakri Alexela (P)	21	36
4	Maardu United II (P)	21	34
5	Piraaja II	21	27
6	Põhja-Tallinna Volta III	21	25
7	Depoo	21	24
8	Soccernet	21	6

Updated to match(es) played on 14 October 2018. Source:
(C) Champions; (P) Promoted

Group B (North & West)
Pos	Team	Pld	Pts
1	Märjamaa Kompanii (C, P)	21	47
2	Pärnu JK II (P)	21	42
3	Olympic Olybet (P)	21	41
4	Kristiine	21	40
5	Toompea	21	32
6	Reaal	21	16
7	Jalgpallihaigla	21	14
8	Lelle	21	8

Updated to match(es) played on 14 October 2018. Source:
(C) Champions; (P) Promoted

Group C (South)
Pos	Team	Pld	Pts
1	Äksi Wolves (C, P)	18	34
2	Tartu Helios II (P)	18	32
3	Tartu Tammeka IV	18	31
4	Põhja-Sakala II	18	29
5	Tartu Welco X	18	29
6	Vaimastvere Illi	18	26
7	Tartu Loomaaed (D)	18	0

Updated to match(es) played on 14 October 2018. Source:
(C) Champions; (D) Disqualified; (P) Promoted

=== Post-season games ===
==== League winners ====
II liiga

Final
Paide Linnameeskond III (II S/W 1st)	4
Põhja-Tallinna JK Volta (II N/E 1st)	0

Home teams listed on top of bracket. (AET): At Extra Time

III liiga

Semifinals
Viimsi JK II (III E 1st)	2
JK Retro (III N 1st)	1
FC Kose (III W 1st)	1
Põhja-Sakala (III S 1st)	3

Final
Viimsi JK II (III E 1st)	0
Põhja-Sakala (III S 1st)	2

Home teams listed on top of bracket. (AET): At Extra Time

IV liiga

Semifinals		Final
		Märjamaa Kompanii (IV N/W 1st)	+
Märjamaa Kompanii (IV N/W 1st)	4	Maarjamäe FC Igiliikur (IV N/E 1st)	–
FC Äksi Wolves (IV S 1st)	1

Home teams listed on top of bracket. (AET): At Extra Time

==== Promotion & Relegation play-offs ====
To Meistriliiga

Team 1	Agg.	Team 2	1st leg	2nd leg
FC Elva (Esiliiga 3rd)	0:2	FC Kuressaare (Meistriliiga 9th)	0:1	0:1

To Esiliiga

Team 1	Agg.	Team 2	1st leg	2nd leg
Kohtla-Järve JK Järve (Esiliiga B 3rd)	3:2	Keila JK (Esiliiga 9th)	3:1	0:1

- 9th placed Keila JK got to play in the play-offs, because 7th placed Tartu FC Santos announced that they are going to play in II liiga the following year and so 8th placed JK Tallinna Kalev U21 remains in Esiliiga and Keila JK has the chance to compete in the play-offs.

To Esiliiga B

Team 1	Agg.	Team 2	1st leg	2nd leg
JK Tabasalu (II S/W 2nd)	4:–	FCI Tallinn (II N/E 2nd)	4:–	+:–
JK Tabasalu (II S/W 2nd)	7:1	Lasnamäe FC Ajax (Esiliiga B 9th)	3:0	4:1

- 9th placed Lasnamäe FC Ajax got to play in the play-offs, because Esiliigas 7th placed Tartu FC Santos announced that they are going to play in II liiga the following year and so 8th placed Paide Linnameeskond U21 remains in Esiliiga B and Lasnamäe FC Ajax has the chance to compete in the play-offs.

To II liiga

Team 1	Agg.	Team 2	1st leg	2nd leg
SK Imavere (III S 2nd)	–:+	Põhja-Tallinna JK Volta II (III W 2nd)	–:+	–:+
Põhja-Tallinna JK Volta II (III W 2nd)	7:2	Tõrva JK (II S/W 12th)	3:1	4:1

Team 1	Agg.	Team 2	1st leg	2nd leg
Tallinna FC Zapoos (III N 2nd)	–:+	JK Loo (III E 2nd)	–:+	–:+
JK Loo (III E 2nd)	2:6	Tartu JK Tammeka III (II N/E 12th)	2:3	0:3

To III liiga

Team 1	Agg.	Team 2	1st leg	2nd leg
Maardu United II (IV N/E 4th)	9:2	Pärnu JK Poseidon II (III W 10th)	4:0	5:2

Team 1	Agg.	Team 2	1st leg	2nd leg
Kristiine JK (IV N/W 4th)	3:13	Tallinna FC Eston Villa (III N 10th)	1:6	2:7

Team 1	Agg.	Team 2	1st leg	2nd leg
FC Toompea (IV N/W 5th)	–:+	SK Kadrina (III E 10th)	–:+	–:+

Team 1	Agg.	Team 2	1st leg	2nd leg
Tartu JK Tammeka IV (IV S 3rd)	0:5	Võru FC Helios II (III S 10th)	0:1	0:4

== Women's football ==
=== Naiste Meistriliiga ===
Pos	Team	Pld	W	D	L	GF	GA	GD	Pts	Qualification
1	Flora	14	14	0	0	83	2	+81	42	Championship group
2	Pärnu	14	12	0	2	77	11	+66	36	Championship group
3	Levadia	14	10	0	4	50	28	+22	30	Championship group
4	Tallinna Kalev	14	5	3	6	21	26	−5	18	Championship group
5	SK 10 Premium	14	3	3	8	15	46	−31	12	Relegation group
6	Tammeka	14	2	3	9	13	58	−45	9	Relegation group
7	Ajax Tallinn	14	2	2	10	13	62	−49	8	Relegation group
8	Põlva FC Lootos	14	2	1	11	11	50	−39	7	Relegation group

Source: Soccerway

Championship round
Pos	Team	Pld	Pts
1	Flora (C, Q)	20	55
2	Pärnu	20	52
3	Levadia	20	30
4	Tallinna Kalev	20	24

Source: Soccerway
(C) Champions; (Q) Qualified for the phase indicated

Relegation round
Pos	Team	Pld	Pts
1	SK 10 Premium	20	22
2	Põlva FC Lootos	20	19
3	Tammeka	20	18
4	Ajax Tallinn (R)	20	12

Source: Soccerway
(R) Relegated

=== Naiste Esiliiga ===
Pos	Team	Pld	W	D	L	GF	GA	GD	Pts	Promotion, qualification or relegation
1	Pärnu JK II (Note: Reserve teams are ineligible for promotion.)	14	12	1	1	68	5	+63	37	Qualification for the Promotion round
2	FC Flora II	14	9	3	2	51	22	+29	30	Qualification for the Promotion round
3	Saku Sporting	14	9	3	2	38	17	+21	30	Qualification for the Promotion round
4	JK Tallinna Kalev II	14	4	5	5	15	25	−10	17	Qualification for the Promotion round
5	FC Elva	14	4	2	8	23	36	−13	14	Qualification for the Relegation round
6	FC Kuressaare	14	3	3	8	14	31	−17	12	Qualification for the Relegation round
7	Nõmme Kalju FC	14	2	4	8	8	53	−45	10	Qualification for the Relegation round
8	JK Tulevik ja Suure-Jaani Unitedi ÜN	14	1	3	10	12	40	−28	6	Qualification for the Relegation round

Updated to match(es) played on 29 August 2018. Source:
Rules for classification: 1) points; 2) goal difference; 3) number of goals scored
Notes:

Championship round
Pos	Team	Pld	Pts
1	Pärnu JK II (C)	20	53
2	Saku Sporting (P)	20	37
3	FC Flora II	20	34
4	JK Tallinna Kalev II	20	22

Updated to match(es) played on 21 October 2018. Source:
(C) Champions; (P) Promoted

Relegation round
Pos	Team	Pld	Pts
5	JK Tulevik ja Suure-Jaani Unitedi ÜN	20	22
6	FC Elva	20	20
7	FC Kuressaare (O)	20	20
8	Nõmme Kalju FC (R)	20	13

Updated to match(es) played on 21 October 2018. Source:
(O) Play-off winners; (R) Relegated

=== Naiste Teine liiga ===
Pos	Team	Pld	W	D	L	GF	GA	GD	Pts	Promotion, qualification or relegation
1	Tallinna JK Legion (C, P)	18	14	0	4	51	17	+34	42	Promotion to 2019 Naiste Esiliiga
2	Tartu JK Tammeka II	18	12	2	4	37	21	+16	38	Qualification to Promotion play-offs
3	Paide Linnanaiskond	18	12	1	5	57	25	+32	37	
4	Rakvere JK Tarvas	18	8	1	9	37	52	−15	25	
5	JK Narva Trans	18	8	1	9	40	32	+8	25	
6	Kohtla-Järve JK Järve	18	6	1	11	19	25	−6	19	
7	Põhja-Tallinna JK Volta	18	0	0	18	2	71	−69	0	

Updated to match(es) played on 21 October 2018. Source:
Rules for classification: 1) points; 2) goal difference; 3) number of goals scored
(C) Champions; (P) Promoted

=== Post-season games ===
To Meistriliiga

Team 1	Agg.	Team 2	1st leg	2nd leg
JK Tulevik ja Suure-Jaani Unitedi ÜN (Esiliiga 5th)	1:5	Tartu JK Tammeka (Meistriliiga 9th)	1:2	0:3

To Esiliiga

Team 1	Agg.	Team 2	1st leg	2nd leg
Tartu JK Tammeka II (II liiga 2nd)	1:2	FC Kuressaare (Esiliiga 7th)	1:1	0:1

== Cup competitions ==
=== Estonian Cup ===
Fourth Round
JK Narva Trans	2
Rakvere JK Tarvas (a.e.t.)	0
Läänemaa JK	1
FCI Tallinn	7
Nõmme Kalju FC	1 (5)
Paide Linnameeskond (a.e.t.)	1 (4)
FCI Levadia Tallinn	7
Kohtla-Järve JK Järve	0
Põhja-Tallinna JK Volta	0
FC Flora U21	3
Viljandi JK Tulevik	+
Maardu United	-
Rumori Calcio Tallinn	0
FC Kuressaare	6
Tallinna FC Flora	2
FC Elva	0

Quarterfinals
JK Narva Trans	6
FCI Tallinn	0
Nõmme Kalju FC	0
FCI Levadia Tallinn	1
FC Flora U21	7
Viljandi JK Tulevik	3
FC Kuressaare	0
Tallinna FC Flora	7

Semifinals
JK Narva Trans	0
FCI Levadia Tallinn	5
FC Flora U21	3
Tallinna FC Flora	9

Final
FCI Levadia Tallinn	1
Tallinna FC Flora	0

Home teams listed on top of bracket. (AET): At Extra Time

=== Estonian Small Cup ===
Fourth Round
Raasiku FC Joker	3 (3)
Viimsi JK (a.e.t.)	3 (0)
Tartu FC Santos II	0
Märjamaa Kompanii	3
Tallinna FC Zapoos	3
Pakri SK Alexela (a.e.t.)	6
FC Elva II	0
Paide Linnameeskond III	6
Tallinna FC Ararat TTÜ	5
EMÜ SK	1
Põhja-Sakala	3 (5)
Põhja-Tallinna JK Volta (a.e.t.)	3 (6)
JK Retro	1
Tallinna JK Piraaja	0
Tartu FC Helios	0
Saue JK	2

Quarterfinals
Raasiku FC Joker	2
Märjamaa Kompanii	1
Pakri SK Alexela	3
Paide Linnameeskond III	1
Tallinna FC Ararat TTÜ	2
Põhja-Tallinna JK Volta	-
JK Retro	2
Saue JK	3

Semifinals
Raasiku FC Joker	1
Pakri SK Alexela	0
Tallinna FC Ararat TTÜ	1
Saue JK	2

Final
Raasiku FC Joker	0
Saue JK	2

Home teams listed on top of bracket. (AET): At Extra Time

=== Estonian Women's Cup ===
Fourth Round
2	JK Tallinna Kalev II	0
2	Tallinna FC Flora II	5
1	Tartu JK Tammeka	1
2	Saku Sporting (a.e.t.)	2
3	Paide Linnameeskond Tapa	1 (2)
2	FC Kuressaare (a.e.t.)	1 (4)
1	Tartu SK 10 Premium	5
1	Tallinna FC Ajax	0

Quarterfinals
1	JK Tallinna Kalev	0
1	Pärnu JK	5
2	Tallinna FC Flora II	1
2	Saku Sporting	0
1	FC Levadia Tallinn	0
1	FC Flora	7
2	FC Kuressaare	0
1	Tartu SK 10 Premium	3

Semifinals
1	Tartu SK 10 Premium	1
2	Tallinna FC Flora II	0
1	FC Flora	2
1	Pärnu JK	0

Final
1	Tartu SK 10 Premium	0
1	FC Flora	7

Home teams listed on top of bracket. (AET): At Extra Time
Number at the back of the club indicates the league in which the club played in 2018

== International competitions ==
Tallinna FC Flora

10 July 2018 Champions League Q1	Flora Tallinn (Estonia)	1–4	(Israel) Hapoel Be'er Sheva	A. Le Coq Arena, Tallinn
17:30 (18:30 EEST)	Sappinen 73' (pen.)	Report	Sahar 18'; Tzedek 36' (pen.); Maman 53'; Ezra 85'	Attendance: 1,106; Referee: Erik Lambrechts (Belgium)

17 July 2018 Champions League Q1	Hapoel Be'er Sheva (Israel)	3–1	(Estonia) Flora Tallinn	Turner Stadium, Be'er Sheva
19:00 (20:00 IDT)	Ezra 15'; Maman 27'; Melikson 48'	Report	Alliku 86'	Attendance: 11,850; Referee: Tomasz Musiał (Poland)

26 July 2018 Europa League Q2	APOEL (Cyprus)	5–0	(Estonia) Flora Tallinn	GSP Stadium, Nicosia
19:00 (20:00 EEST)	Tavares 25'; Souza 44'; Morais 47' (pen.); Sallai 73'; Dellatorre 78'	Report		Attendance: 9,836; Referee: Marco Fritz (Germany)

2 August 2018 Europa League Q2	Flora Tallinn (Estonia)	2–0	(Cyprus) APOEL	A. Le Coq Arena, Tallinn
18:00 (19:00 EEST)	Kams 32'; Poom 37'	Report		Attendance: 801; Referee: Amaury Delerue (France)

Nõmme Kalju FC

12 July 2018 Europa League Q1	Stjarnan (Iceland)	3–0	(Estonia) Nõmme Kalju	Stjörnuvöllur, Garðabær
22:00 (20:00 WET)	Halldórsson 19' (pen.); Sigurðsson 49'; Baldvinsson 70'	Report		Attendance: 980; Referee: Radek Příhoda (Czech Republic)

19 July 2018 Europa League Q1	Nõmme Kalju (Estonia)	1–0	(Iceland) Stjarnan	Kadriorg Stadium, Tallinn (Note: Nõmme Kalju played their home match at Kadriorg Stadium, Tallinn, instead of their regular stadium Hiiu Stadium, Tallinn.)
18:00 (19:00 EEST)	Tamm 88'	Report		Attendance: 1,455; Referee: Giorgi Kruashvili (Georgia)

Tallinna FCI Levadia

12 July 2018 Europa League Q1	FCI Levadia (Estonia)	0–1	(Republic of Ireland) Dundalk	Kadriorg Stadium, Tallinn
18:00 (19:00 EEST)		Report	Connolly 53'	Attendance: 1,343; Referee: Bojan Nikolić (Serbia)

19 July 2018 Europa League Q1	Dundalk (Republic of Ireland)	2–1	(Estonia) FCI Levadia	Oriel Park, Dundalk
20:45 (19:45 IST)	Hoban 31'; Duffy 33'	Report	Debelko 42'	Attendance: 3,000; Referee: Adrien Jaccottet (Switzerland)

JK Narva Trans

12 July 2018 Europa League Q1	Narva Trans (Estonia)	0–2	(Bosnia and Herzegovina) Željezničar	A. Le Coq Arena, Tallinn (Note: Narva Trans played their home match at A. Le Coq Arena, Tallinn, instead of their regular stadium Narva Kreenholmi Stadium, Narva.)
18:00 (19:00 EEST)		Report	Kotenko 15' (o.g.); Šabanadžović 74'	Attendance: 263; Referee: Daniyar Sakhi (Kazakhstan)

18 July 2018 Europa League Q1	Željezničar (Bosnia and Herzegovina)	3–1	(Estonia) Narva Trans	Stadion Grbavica, Sarajevo
18:00	Zajmović 25'; Krpić 29', 82'	Report	Plotnikov 5'	Attendance: 7,603; Referee: Cătălin Găman (Romania)

Pärnu JK

Pos	Team	Pld	W	D	L	GF	GA	GD	Pts	Qualification	SFK	VLL	PÄR	ANE
1	(Bosnia and Herzegovina) SFK 2000 (H)	3	3	0	0	12	1	+11	9	Round of 32	—	5–0	—	5–0
2	(Albania) Vllaznia	3	2	0	1	7	7	0	6		—	—	3–1	—
3	(Estonia) Pärnu	3	1	0	2	4	5	−1	3		1–2	—	—	2–0
4	(Moldova) Agarista-ȘS Anenii Noi	3	0	0	3	1	11	−10	0		—	1–4	—	—

Source: UEFA
(H) Hosts

7 August 2018 Champions League Round 1	Pärnu (Estonia)	2–0	(Moldova) Agarista-ȘS Anenii Noi	Asim Ferhatović Hase Stadium, Sarajevo
11:00	Bannikova 49'; Tülp 66'	Report		Referee: Elvira Nurmustafina (Kazakhstan)

10 August 2018 Champions League Round 1	Vllaznia Shkodër (Albania)	3–1	(Estonia) Pärnu	Asim Ferhatović Hase Stadium, Sarajevo
11:00	Franja 18'; Gjini 48'; Doci 80'	Report	Shcherbachenia 12'	Referee: Elvira Nurmustafina (Kazakhstan)

13 August 2018 Champions League Round 1	Pärnu (Estonia)	1–2	(Bosnia and Herzegovina) SFK 2000	Bosnia and Herzegovina FA Training Centre, Zenica
17:00	Shcherbachenia 9'	Report	Djoković 26'; Hadžić 30'	Referee: Sílvia Domingos (Portugal)
