= Arnas Besigirskis =

Estonian footballer (born 2008)

Personal information
- Date of birth: 16 January 2008 (age 18)
- Place of birth: Oldham, England
- Height: 1.76 m (5 ft 9 in)
- Position: Midfielder

Team information
- Current team: Narva Trans
- Number: 22

Youth career
- 2017–2025: Narva Trans

Senior career*
Years	Team	Apps	(Gls)
2024–	Narva Trans II	58	(11)
2025–	Narva Trans	26	(0)

International career^{‡}
2023	Estonia U16	3	(0)
2024	Estonia U17	3	(0)
2026–	Estonia U19	3	(0)
- * Club domestic league appearances and goals as of 17 November 2026 ‡ National team caps and goals as of 8 June 2026

Arnas Besigirskis (born 16 January 2008) is a professional footballer who plays as a midfielder for Narva Trans. Born in England, he represents Estonia at youth level.

== Club career ==
He was born in Oldham. He came through the youth ranks at Narva Trans.

On 21 October 2025, he made his debut for Narva in an Meistriliiga match against Flora.

== International career ==
Besigirskis was an Estonian youth international.

== Honours ==
Estonia

- U19 Baltic Cup: 2026
