= List of Estonian football transfers winter 2020–21 =

This is a list of Estonian football transfers in the winter transfer window 2020–21 by club.

This transfer window was open between the 2020 Meistriliiga and the 2021 Meistriliiga season. 1 club has changed: Pärnu JK Vaprus joins Estonian top division, while JK Tallinna Kalev was relegated.

== Meistriliiga ==
=== Flora ===
In:

No.	Pos.	Nation	Player
—	GK	(Estonia) EST	Karl-Romet Nõmm (from Viljandi JK Tulevik)
—	FW	(Estonia) EST	Henrik Ojamaa (from (Poland) Widzew Łódź)
—	FW	(Estonia) EST	Sten Reinkort (from Tartu JK Tammeka)
—	DF	(Estonia) EST	Erko Jonne Tõugjas (from Nõmme United)
—	FW	(Estonia) EST	Sergei Zenjov (from (Kazakhstan) Shakhter Karagandy)
—	FW	(Estonia) EST	Taaniel Usta (from (Finland) KTP)

Out:

No.	Pos.	Nation	Player
20	MF	(Estonia) EST	Leonid Arhipov (to Tallinna Legion)
3	DF	(Estonia) EST	Enar Jääger (end of career)
5	MF	(Estonia) EST	Vladislav Kreida (loan to (Sweden) Helsingborgs IF)
77	GK	(Estonia) EST	Kristen Lapa (to Kuressaare)
7	MF	(Estonia) EST	Frank Liivak
—	FW	(Estonia) EST	Vlasi Sinjavski (to (Czech Republic) Karviná)

=== Paide Linnameeskond ===
In:

No.	Pos.	Nation	Player
—	GK	(Estonia) EST	Mihkel Aksalu
—	FW	(Guinea) GUI	Sekou Amadou Camara (from (Switzerland) Wil)
—	FW	(Estonia) EST	Raimond Eino (from Nõmme United)
—	MF	(Estonia) EST	Marten Henrik Kelement (from Keila JK)
—	DF	(Ghana) GHA	Ishaku Konda (from (Ghana) Asokwa Deportivo)
—	DF	(Estonia) EST	Hindrek Ojamaa (from KTP)

Out:

No.	Pos.	Nation	Player
17	MF	(Brazil) BRA	Bruno Caprioli
4	DF	(Spain) ESP	Mikel Gurrutxaga
—	FW	(Uganda) UGA	Edrisa Lubega (loan to (Czech Republic) Pribram)
6	DF	(The Gambia) GAM	Muhammed Sanneh (loan to (Czech Republic) Baník Ostrava)
—	MF	(Estonia) EST	Magnar Vainumäe
22	FW	(Estonia) EST	Ander Ott Valge

=== FCI Levadia ===
In:

No.	Pos.	Nation	Player
—	FW	(Estonia) EST	Hannes Anier (from Tallinna Kalev)
—	MF	(Estonia) EST	Ilja Antonov (from Ararat-Armenia)
—	MF	(Estonia) EST	Zakaria Beglarishvili (from (Finland) KTP)
—	DF	(Serbia) SRB	Milijan Ilić (from (Serbia) FK Inđija)
—	MF	(Estonia) EST	Frank Liivak
—	DF	(Georgia (country)) GEO	Anton Tolordava (from (Georgia (country)) FC Telavi)
—	GK	(Estonia) EST	Karl Andre Vallner (from Tallinna Kalev)

Out:

No.	Pos.	Nation	Player
12	GK	(Estonia) EST	Richard Aland (to Narva Trans)
10	MF	(Cameroon) CMR	Marcelin Gando
26	FW	(Ukraine) UKR	Yuriy Kolomoyets
14	DF	(Estonia) EST	Dmitri Kruglov (to Maardu Linnameeskond)
34	DF	(Serbia) SRB	Nemanja Lakić-Pešić
11	FW	(Ivory Coast) CIV	Manucho
3	DF	(Ukraine) UKR	Zurab Ochihava

=== Nõmme Kalju ===
In:

No.	Pos.	Nation	Player
—	GK	(Estonia) EST	Sergei Lepmets (goalkeeping coach and player)

Out:

No.	Pos.	Nation	Player
5	DF	(Ukraine) UKR	Ivan Lobay
27	MF	(Estonia) EST	Sander Puri
77	MF	(Estonia) EST	Andreas Raudsepp
23	DF	(Brazil) BRA	Pedro Victor

=== Tartu Tammeka ===
In:

No.	Pos.	Nation	Player
—	MF	(Estonia) EST	Sander Kapper (from Viljandi JK Tulevik)
—	DF	(Estonia) EST	Taijo Teniste (from (Norway) SK Brann)

Out:

No.	Pos.	Nation	Player
20	MF	(Estonia) EST	Mart Paul Preiman
10	FW	(Estonia) EST	Sten Reinkort (to FC Flora)
15	DF	(Russia) RUS	Mikhail Slashchev
6	MF	(Estonia) EST	Tauno Tekko (to Pärnu Vaprus)

=== Viljandi Tulevik ===
In:

No.	Pos.	Nation	Player
—	GK	(Estonia) EST	Marten Ritson (from Paide Linnameeskond)

Out:

No.	Pos.	Nation	Player
27	MF	(Canada) CAN	Jude Barrow
5	DF	(Austria) AUT	Marco Budic
62	DF	(Poland) POL	Jeremiah Dabrowski
17	MF	(Estonia) EST	Sander Kapper (to Tartu Tammeka)
79	MF	(Estonia) EST	Pavel Marin
1	GK	(Estonia) EST	Karl-Romet Nõmm (to FC Flora)
30	FW	(Benin) BEN	Jonas Tossou

=== Tallinna Legion ===
In:

No.	Pos.	Nation	Player
—	MF	(Estonia) EST	Leonid Arhipov (from Flora)
—	MF	(Estonia) EST	Pavel Dõmov (from Tallinna Kalev)
—	GK	(Estonia) EST	Rene Merilo (from Paide Linnameeskond U21)

Out:

No.	Pos.	Nation	Player
74	FW	(Estonia) EST	Rejal Alijev
10	MF	(Georgia (country)) GEO	Giorgi Gvinashvili
9	FW	(Estonia) EST	Marek Šatov
17	MF	(Estonia) EST	Kirill Vinogradov

=== Narva Trans ===
In:

No.	Pos.	Nation	Player
—	GK	(Estonia) EST	Richard Aland (from FCI Levadia)

Out:

No.	Pos.	Nation	Player
12	DF	(Ghana) GHA	Ofosu Appiah
99	FW	(Nigeria) NGA	Geoffrey Chinedu (loan return to (Ukraine) Olimpik Donetsk)
4	DF	(Russia) RUS	Aleksandr Ivanyushin (loan return to Nõmme Kalju)
88	GK	(Estonia) EST	Aleksei Matrossov
7	FW	(Azerbaijan) AZE	Nurlan Novruzov
21	FW	(Estonia) EST	Viktor Plotnikov
18	MF	(Estonia) EST	Roman Sobtšenko
8	MF	(Mali) MLI	Sadio Tounkara

=== Kuressaare ===
In:

No.	Pos.	Nation	Player
—	GK	(Estonia) EST	Kristen Lapa (from Flora)

Out:

No.	Pos.	Nation	Player
3	MF	(Estonia) EST	Sören Kaldma
19	MF	(Estonia) EST	Daniel Tuhkanen (loan return to FC Flora)
39	DF	(Estonia) EST	Elari Valmas (retired)

=== Pärnu Vaprus ===
In:

No.	Pos.	Nation	Player
—	MF	(Estonia) EST	Marek Kaljumäe (from Tallinna Kalev)
—	MF	(Estonia) EST	Tauno Tekko (from Tartu Tammeka)

Out:

No.	Pos.	Nation	Player
