= Karl-Romet Nõmm =

Estonian footballer (born 1998)

Personal information
- Full name: Karl-Romet Nõmm
- Date of birth: 4 January 1998 (age 28)
- Place of birth: Pärsti Parish, Estonia
- Height: 1.99 m (6 ft 6 1/2 in)
- Position: Goalkeeper

Team information
- Current team: Kuressaare
- Number: 31

Youth career
- 2006–2013: Tulevik

Senior career*
Years	Team	Apps	(Gls)
2013–2020	Tulevik	177	(0)
2013–2019	Tulevik U21	31	(0)
2020–2022	Flora	33	(0)
2021–2022	Flora U21	11	(0)
2023	Sandecja Nowy Sącz	10	(0)
2024	Viimsi	33	(0)
2025–	Kuressaare	71	(0)

International career^{‡}
2014	Estonia U17	4	(0)
2015	Estonia U18	1	(0)
2015–2016	Estonia U19	8	(0)
2018–2020	Estonia U21	6	(0)
2023–	Estonia	1	(0)
- * Club domestic league appearances and goals as of 17 November 2026 ‡ National team caps and goals as of 26 January 2023

Karl-Romet Nõmm (born 4 January 1998) is an Estonian professional footballer who plays as a goalkeeper for Meistriliiga club Kuressaare.

== Club career ==
Nõmm started his career in Viljandi Tulevik and debuted in Estonian top division Meistriliiga on 7 March 2015 when he was 17-years old.

He joined Flora in December 2020.

In January 2023, he signed a one-and-a-half-year deal with Polish club Sandecja Nowy Sącz.

== International career ==
Nõmm made his senior international debut for Estonia on 12 January 2023, in a 1–0 victory over Finland in a friendly.

== Honours ==
Tulevik

- Esiliiga: 2016

Flora

- Meistriliiga: 2022
- Estonian Supercup: 2021
