= Under-21 Baltic Cup =

Regional football tournament for national teams from Baltic states and Finland

- Founded: 2008
- Region: Europe (UEFA)
- Teams: 3-4
- Current champions: Lithuania (3rd title)
- Most championships: Latvia (4 titles)

The Under-21 Baltic Cup is an biennial football competition for under-21 national football teams organised by the Baltic states. Baltic Cup often invites guest participants from the region, such as Finland.

== Results ==
Year	Winner	Runner-up	Third place	Fourth place
2008	Latvia	Lithuania	Estonia	
2010	Lithuania	Latvia	Estonia	
2012	Finland	Lithuania	Estonia	Latvia
2014	Estonia	Latvia	Lithuania	
2016	Latvia	Estonia	Lithuania	
2018	Lithuania	Latvia	Estonia	
2022	Latvia	Estonia	Lithuania	
2024	Latvia	Estonia	Finland	Lithuania
2026	Lithuania	Estonia	Latvia	—N/a

=== Performance by country ===
Team	1st place, gold medalist(s)	2nd place, silver medalist(s)	3rd place, bronze medalist(s)	Titles
Latvia	4	3	1	2008, 2016, 2022, 2024
Lithuania	3	2	3	2010, 2018, 2026
Estonia	1	4	4	2014
Finland	1	0	1	2012

== See also ==
- Baltic Cup
- Under-19 Baltic Cup
- Under-17 Baltic Cup
