= Under-17 Baltic Cup =

Regional football tournament for national teams from Baltic states and Finland

- Founded: 2008
- Region: Europe (UEFA)
- Teams: 3-4
- Current champions: Latvia (9th title)
- Most championships: Latvia (9 titles)

The Under-17 Baltic Cup is an annual football competition for under-17 national football teams organised by the Baltic states. Baltic Cup often invites guest participants from the region, such as Finland.

== Results ==
Year	Hosts	Winner	Runner-up	Third place	Fourth place
2008	(Estonia) Kernu (Estonia) Tallinn	Latvia	Estonia	Lithuania	—N/a
2009		Estonia	Lithuania	Latvia	—N/a
2010		Latvia	Lithuania	Estonia	—N/a
2011		Finland	Lithuania	Estonia	Latvia
2012		Lithuania	Estonia	Latvia	Finland
2013		Finland	Latvia	Estonia	Lithuania
2014		Estonia	Latvia	Lithuania	Finland
2015		Latvia	Finland	Estonia	Lithuania
2016		Lithuania	Finland	Estonia	Latvia
2017		Estonia	Finland	Latvia	Lithuania
2018		Latvia	Finland	Estonia	Lithuania
2019		Finland	Estonia	Latvia	Lithuania
2020		Latvia	Lithuania	Estonia	
2021	(Estonia) Tallinn	Latvia	Estonia	Lithuania	
2022		Latvia	Finland	Estonia	Lithuania
2023		Finland	Estonia	Lithuania	Latvia
2024		Lithuania	Finland	Latvia	Estonia
2025		Latvia	Finland	Lithuania	Estonia
2026		Latvia	Finland	Lithuania	Estonia

=== Performance by country ===
Team	1st place, gold medalist(s)	2nd place, silver medalist(s)	3rd place, bronze medalist(s)	Titles
Latvia	9	2	5	2008, 2010, 2015, 2018, 2020, 2021, 2022, 2025, 2026
Finland	4	8	0	2011, 2013, 2019, 2023
Estonia	3	5	8	2009, 2014, 2017
Lithuania	3	4	6	2012, 2016, 2024

== See also ==
- Baltic Cup
- Under-21 Baltic Cup
- Under-19 Baltic Cup
