= Edrisa Lubega =

Ugandan footballer (born 1998)

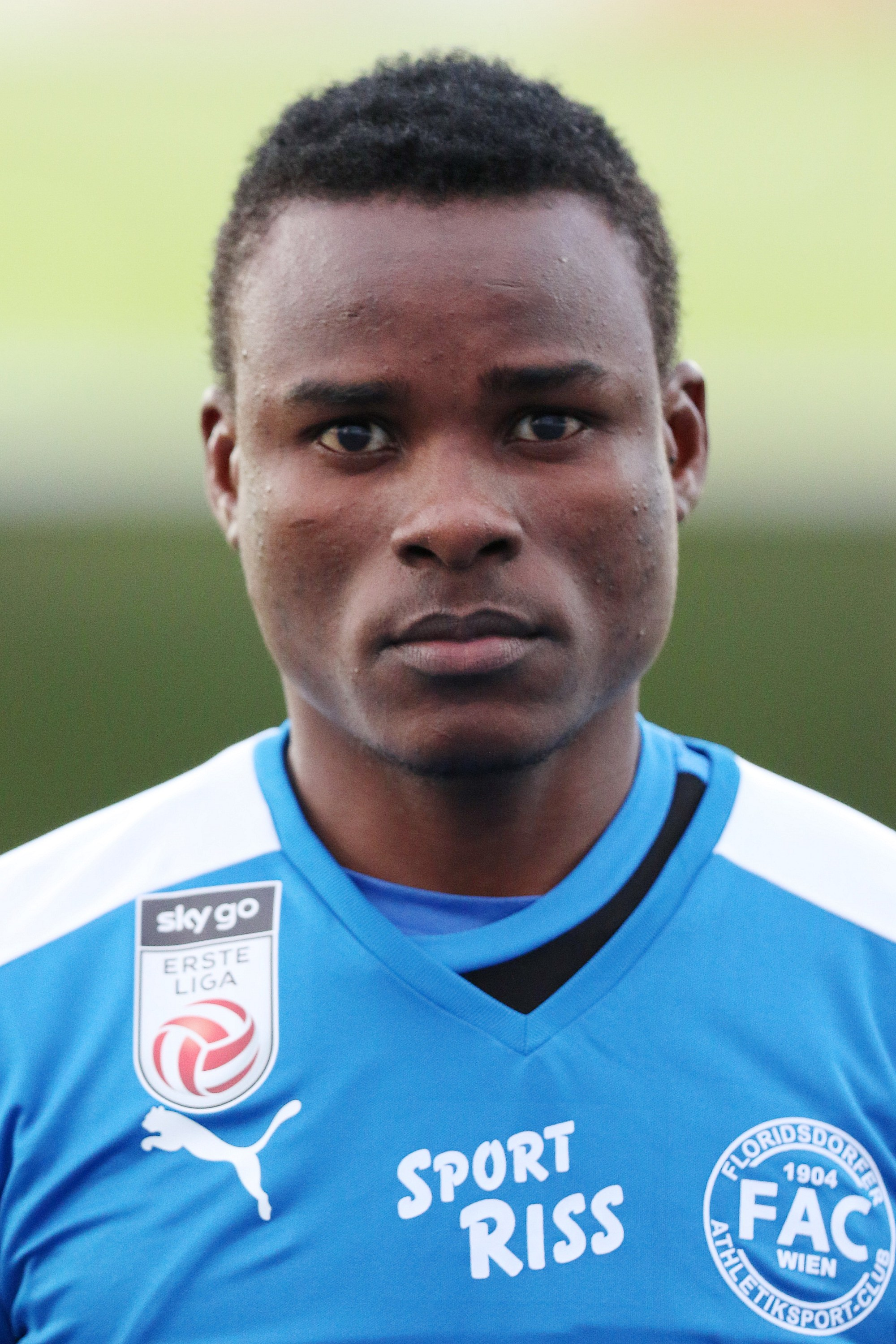

Personal information
- Date of birth: 17 April 1998 (age 28)
- Place of birth: Kasese, Uganda
- Height: 1.81 m (5 ft 11 in)
- Position: Forward

Senior career*
Years	Team	Apps	(Gls)
2015–2019	Proline		
2017–2018	→ Floridsdorfer AC (loan)	39	(9)
2018–2019	→ SV Ried (loan)	19	(1)
2020–2022	Paide Linnameeskond	26	(14)
2020–2021	→ 1. FK Příbram (loan)	9	(2)
2021–2022	→ Estrela Amadora (loan)	5	(0)

International career^{‡}
2016–	Uganda	11	(0)
- * Club domestic league appearances and goals as of 23 April 2022 ‡ National team caps and goals as of 29 August 2019

Edrisa Lubega (born 17 April 1998) is a Ugandan footballer.

== Early life ==
Christened 'Torres' after Fernando Torres, he was born to a family with 4 children to Mugisha Tumushabe and Rebecca Nakamya.

He scored in their first win of the 2016–17 Uganda Super League.

Before Proline FC were promoted, when they were playing in the FUFA Big League, he was their top striker, scoring 21 goals, which enabled him to be selected for the Uganda national football team.

Unbeknownst to his school, Dynamic S.S., Lubega left to play for Proline FC without notifying anybody related to the school whatsoever or the competition secretariat, therefore could not participate in the 2016 Copa Coca-Cola Schools tournament according to the rules.

== Club career ==
=== Floridsdorfer AC ===
In February 2017, Lubega was loaned out to Austrian Football Second League club Floridsdorfer AC. He made his league debut for the club on 24 February 2017 in a 1–0 home victory over Austria Lustenau. He scored his first league goal for the club on 12 May 2017, scoring in the 10th minute of a 3-0 home victory over Wiener Neustadt. His goal, which was assisted by George Davies, made the score 1-0 to Floridsdorfer.

=== SV Ried ===
In July 2018, Lubega was loaned out again, this time to SV Ried on a one-year loan with an option to extend for another year. He made his league debut for the club on 5 August 2018, registering an assist on Thomas Mayer's opening goal as Ried defeated WSG Wattens 2–1. He scored his first competitive goal for the club on 17 August 2018 in a 3–0 home victory over FC Liefering. His goal, scored in the 45th minute and assisted by Manuel Kerhe, made the score 1–0 to Ried.

=== Proline ===
In August 2019, Lubega came back to Proline and signed a one-year contract.

=== Estrela ===
On 17 July 2021, he joined Estrela da Amadora in Portugal on loan.

== International career ==
Milutin Sredojević included Edrisa Lubega on his 30-man squad for the Uganda national football team. He made his senior international debut on 27 January 2016, coming on as a 79th minute substitute for Erisa Ssekisambu in a 1–1 draw with Zimbabwe in the African Nations Championship Group Stages.
