= Estonian County Competition =

Estonian football competition for amateurs

- Season: 1
- Matches played: 40
- Goals scored: 202 (5.05 per match)
- Top goalscorer: (Estonia) Tiit Tikenberg (5 goals) (Estonia) Sander Laht (5 goals)
- Biggest home win: Ida-Virumaa 12–3 Põlvamaa (2015)
- Biggest away win: Läänemaa 0–5 Harjumaa (2012)
- Highest scoring: Ida-Virumaa 12–3 Järvamaa (2015)
- Longest winning run: Harjumaa (4 games) (2012–2015)
- Longest unbeaten run: Harjumaa (5 games) (2012–2016)
- Longest winless run: Hiiumaa (3 games) (2012–2014); Põlvamaa (3 games) (2014–2016); Raplamaa (3 games) (2012–2014)
- Longest losing run: Hiiumaa (3 games) (2012–2014)

This is the Estonian County Competition.

== Competition ==
Estonian Football Association together with the provincial sport associations and local promoters arrange the Estonian County Competition, where 15 counties and the capital Tallinn have their football teams face each other. All teams will play each other twice (home and away). If a game is drawn, a winner will be founded with penalties, but a draw is put into the protocol and both teams get one point added to the table. Every year every team plays one game. The competition was started in 2012.

== Stadiums ==
Team	Stadium	Capacity
Harjumaa	Raasiku staadion	200
Harjumaa	Keila Stadium	500
Hiiumaa	Kärdla linnastaadion	
Ida-Virumaa	Narva Kreenholmi staadion	1,065
Ida-Virumaa	Narva FAMA staadion	1,000
Ida-Virumaa	Sillamäe Kalevi Stadium	800
Jõgevamaa	Jõgeva linnastaadion	
Jõgevamaa	Jõgeva aleviku staadion	80
Järvamaa	Paide linnastaadion	268
Läänemaa	Haapsalu linnastaadion	
Lääne-Virumaa	Rakvere linnastaadion	1,829
Pärnumaa	Pärnu Rannastaadion	1,250
Põlvamaa	Põlva linnastaadion	
Põlvamaa	Lootospark	600
Raplamaa	Rapla ÜG staadion	
Raplamaa	Kohila staadion	
Saaremaa	Kuressaare linnastaadion	1,000
Saaremaa	Leisi staadion	
Saaremaa	Muhu Krundi Sporditalu staadion	
Tallinn	TNTK staadion	
Tallinn	A. Le Coq Arena	10,340
Tartumaa	Tamme Stadium	1,500
Valgamaa	Tehvandi staadion	3,000
Valgamaa	Valga Keskstaadion	450
Viljandimaa	Viljandi linnastaadion	1,084
Võrumaa	Võru linnastaadion	
Võrumaa	Võru Spordikeskuse staadion	

Pos	Team	Pld	W	D	L	GF	GA	GD	Pts
1	Tallinn	9	6	1	2	27	16	+11	19
2	Harjumaa	9	6	1	2	29	22	+7	19
3	Võrumaa	9	6	1	2	27	18	+9	19
4	Tartumaa	9	6	0	3	39	16	+23	18
5	Valgamaa	9	5	2	2	38	17	+21	17
6	Järvamaa	9	5	1	3	29	27	+2	16
7	Viljandimaa	9	5	0	4	18	20	−2	15
8	Raplamaa	9	4	1	4	16	20	−4	13
9	Saaremaa	9	4	0	5	23	24	−1	12
10	Ida-Virumaa	9	4	0	5	30	33	−3	12
11	Põlvamaa	9	3	1	5	18	42	−24	10
12	Jõgevamaa	9	3	1	5	18	14	+4	10
13	Pärnumaa	9	3	0	6	24	27	−3	9
14	Läänemaa	9	3	0	6	26	28	−2	9
15	Hiiumaa	9	2	1	6	10	23	−13	7
16	Lääne-Virumaa	9	2	0	7	8	33	−25	6

Updated to match(es) played on 4th of November 2022. Source: Eesti maavõistlused

== Fixtures and results ==
Home \ Away	HAR	HII	IVI	JÕG	JÄR	LÄÄ	LVI	PÄR	PÕL	RAP	SAA	TAL	TAR	VAL	VIL	VÕR
Harjumaa		5–2				6–4					5–1					
Hiiumaa	2–2 (Note: Harjumaa won with penalties 5–3)					2–0					0–1			2–0		
Ida-Virumaa					12–3		1–0			5–1			0–6			
Jõgevamaa	0–1								3–0					0–1		2–3
Järvamaa			7–3				3–1			5–1						5–1
Läänemaa	0–5	6–0									5–1					
Lääne-Virumaa			1–3		2–0					2–1						
Pärnumaa												2–0	5–0		2–3	
Põlvamaa				2–2 (Note: Põlvamaa won with penalties 4–2)		1–0								3–7		4–1
Raplamaa			5–2		1–1 (Note: Järvamaa won with penalties 5–4)		1–0									
Saaremaa	1–4	3–1				11–1		0–2								
Tallinn								5–3					1–3		2–0	
Tartumaa							6–0	3–0				1–4			0–1	
Valgamaa				5–2					14–1							2–4
Viljandimaa								6–5		4–3		1–2	1–4			
Võrumaa				3–1					3–0					2–2 (Note: Võrumaa won with penalties 5–4)		

Updated to match(es) played on 3 June 2018. Source:
Legend: Blue = home team win; Yellow = draw; Red = away team win.
