= Under-19 Baltic Cup =

Regional football tournament for national teams from Baltic states and Finland

- Founded: 2008
- Region: Europe (UEFA)
- Teams: 3-4
- Current champions: Estonia (1st title)
- Most championships: Latvia (10 titles)

The Under-19 Baltic Cup is an annual football competition for under-19 national football teams organised by the Baltic states. Baltic Cup often invites guest participants from the region, such as Finland.

== Results ==
| Year | Winner | Runner-up | Third place | Fourth place |
|---|---|---|---|---|
| 2008 | Latvia | Estonia | Lithuania | —N/a |
| 2009 | Latvia | Estonia | Lithuania | —N/a |
| 2010 | Lithuania | Estonia | Latvia | —N/a |
| 2011 | Finland | Estonia | Latvia | Lithuania |
| 2012 | Latvia | Lithuania | Finland | Estonia |
| 2013 | Finland | Latvia | Estonia | Lithuania |
| 2014 | Latvia | Estonia | Lithuania | Finland |
| 2015 | Lithuania | Finland | Estonia | Latvia |
| 2016 | Latvia | Lithuania | Finland | Estonia |
| 2017 | Lithuania | Finland | Latvia | Estonia |
| 2018 | Latvia | Lithuania | Finland | Estonia |
| 2019 | Latvia | Finland | Estonia | Lithuania |
| 2022 | Latvia | Finland | Estonia | Lithuania |
| 2023 | Finland | Latvia | Lithuania | Estonia |
| 2024 | Latvia | Estonia | Lithuania | —N/a |
| 2025 | Latvia | Lithuania | Estonia | —N/a |
| 2026 | Estonia | Latvia | Lithuania | —N/a |

=== Performance by country ===
| Team | 1st place, gold medalist(s) | 2nd place, silver medalist(s) | 3rd place, bronze medalist(s) | Titles |
|---|---|---|---|---|
| Latvia | 10 | 3 | 3 | 2008, 2009, 2012, 2014, 2016, 2018, 2019, 2022, 2024, 2025 |
| Lithuania | 3 | 4 | 6 | 2010, 2015, 2017 |
| Finland | 3 | 4 | 3 | 2011, 2013, 2023 |
| Estonia | 1 | 6 | 5 | 2026 |

== See also ==
- Baltic Cup
- Under-21 Baltic Cup
- Under-17 Baltic Cup
