= Estonia national under-19 football team =

Estonia U19
- Nickname: Sinisärgid (Blueshirts)
- Association: Estonian Football Association
- Confederation: UEFA (Europe)
- Head coach: Siim Valtna
- Most caps: Karol Mets (32)
- Top scorer: Herol Riiberg; Erik Sorga (6)
- Home stadium: A. Le Coq Arena
- FIFA code: EST
First colours	Second colours

UEFA U-19 Championship
- Appearances: 1 (first in 2012)
- Best result: Group Stage (2012)

The Estonia national under-19 football team represents Estonia in international under-19 football and is controlled by the Estonian Football Association (Eesti Jalgpalli Liit), the governing body for football in Estonia. The team's home ground is the A. Le Coq Arena in Tallinn, and the current manager is Siim Valtna.

Estonia qualified as hosts to the 2012 UEFA European Under-19 Championship, making it Estonia's first appearance in a major tournament and the first major football tournament to be held in the country. The team failed to get past the group stage, losing all three matches against Portugal, Greece and Spain.

== Competition history ==
=== UEFA European Under-19 Championship ===
UEFA European Under-19 Championship record									Qualification record					
Year	Round	Position	Pld	W	D	L	GF	GA	Pld	W	D	L	GF	GA
(Norway) 2002	did not qualify								2	0	0	2	1	9
(Liechtenstein) 2003	did not qualify								3	0	0	3	2	12
(Switzerland) 2004	did not qualify								3	0	0	3	1	13
(Northern Ireland) 2005	did not qualify								3	0	0	3	2	14
(Poland) 2006	did not qualify								3	0	0	3	2	7
(Austria) 2007	did not qualify								3	1	0	2	5	12
(Czech Republic) 2008	did not qualify								3	0	1	2	3	14
(Ukraine) 2009	did not qualify								6	2	0	4	7	20
(France) 2010	did not qualify								3	0	0	3	1	10
(Romania) 2011	did not qualify								6	2	1	3	6	6
(Estonia) 2012	Group stage	8th	3	0	0	3	1	9	Qualified as hosts					
(Lithuania) 2013	did not qualify								3	1	0	2	2	6
(Hungary) 2014	did not qualify								3	0	1	2	4	10
(Greece) 2015	did not qualify								3	1	1	1	3	1
(Germany) 2016	did not qualify								3	1	0	2	3	7
(Georgia (country)) 2017	did not qualify								3	0	0	3	0	14
(Finland) 2018	did not qualify								3	0	0	3	1	9
(Armenia) 2019	did not qualify								3	0	0	3	0	6
(Slovakia) 2022	did not qualify								3	0	0	3	0	7
(Malta) 2023	did not qualify								6	2	0	4	6	11
(Northern Ireland) 2024	did not qualify								3	0	0	3	0	9
(Romania) 2025	did not qualify								3	1	1	1	4	4
(Wales) 2026	did not qualify								3	0	2	1	2	4
Total	Group stage	1/23	3	0	0	3	1	9	74	11	7	56	55	204

Draws include knockout matches decided on penalty kicks.

== Coaching staff ==
Position	Name
Head coach	(Estonia) Siim Valtna
Assistant coach	(Estonia) Joonas Ljaš
Goalkeeping coach	(Estonia) Ain Tammus
Physiotherapist	(Estonia) Margus Parts
Physiotherapist	(Estonia) Roger Teor
Manager	(Estonia) Even Laanemaa

== Players ==
=== Latest squad ===
The following players were named in the squad for the 2027 UEFA European Under-19 Championship qualification matches against Liechtenstein, Turkey and Slovakia, played between 11–17 November 2026.

Caps and goals correct as of 17 November 2026, after the match against Slovakia.

No.	Pos.	Player	Date of birth (age)	Caps	Goals	Club
1	GK	Markkus Ristimets	19 August 2008 (age 18)	10	0	(Estonian Football Association) Vaprus
12	GK	Harly Ollin	23 August 2009 (age 17)	0	0	(Estonian Football Association) Harju
2	DF	Mark Villem Marmei (captain)	3 March 2008 (age 18)	5	1	(Estonian Football Association) Nõmme United
3	DF	Ronald Sammul	23 March 2009 (age 17)	5	0	(Estonian Football Association) Flora
4	DF	Uku Nõmm	5 June 2009 (age 17)	3	0	(Estonian Football Association) Vaprus
6	DF	Romet Leppik	11 May 2008 (age 18)	12	0	(Estonian Football Association) Nõmme United
7	DF	Patrick Pihlak	19 August 2008 (age 18)	3	0	(Estonian Football Association) Flora
17	DF	Tristan Zahovaiko	18 September 2008 (age 18)	4	0	(Estonian Football Association) FCI Levadia
19	DF	Johannes Lillemets	20 November 2008 (age 17)	16	0	(Estonian Football Association) Nõmme Kalju
23	DF	Markus Kesa	4 June 2008 (age 18)	5	0	(Estonian Football Association) Harju
8	MF	Jaron Silm	10 March 2009 (age 17)	3	1	(Estonian Football Association) Flora
10	MF	Marten Kukkonen	18 July 2008 (age 18)	10	1	(Estonian Football Association) Flora
11	MF	Robert Mihhalevski	10 January 2009 (age 17)	4	0	(Football Association of Finland) HJK
16	MF	Arnas Besigirskis	16 January 2008 (age 18)	6	0	(Estonian Football Association) Narva Trans
18	MF	Remo Valdmets	6 January 2008 (age 18)	16	2	(Estonian Football Association) Flora
21	MF	Andero Kaares	29 June 2009 (age 17)	9	4	(Royal Spanish Football Federation) Villarreal
9	FW	Trevor Hint	14 May 2008 (age 18)	9	2	(German Football Association) VfL Wolfsburg
14	FW	Sander Alamaa	9 February 2008 (age 18)	11	0	(Estonian Football Association) Flora
15	FW	Rafael Siim Schwarz	11 February 2008 (age 18)	5	5	(German Football Association) Eintracht Norderstedt
20	FW	Aston Visse	14 February 2009 (age 17)	4	2	(Estonian Football Association) Kuressaare

=== Previous squads ===
UEFA European Under-19 Championship

- UEFA Euro 2012 squad

== Honours ==
- Under-19 Baltic Cup winners: 2026

== See also ==
- Estonia national football team
- Estonia national under-23 football team
- Estonia national under-21 football team
- Estonia national under-17 football team
- Estonia national youth football team
