= Estonia national under-17 football team =

National association football team

Estonia Under-17
- Nickname: Sinisärgid (Blueshirts)
- Association: Eesti Jalgpalli Liit (EJL)
- Confederation: UEFA (Europe)
- Head coach: Marko Pärnpuu
- Most caps: Henri Välja (22)
- Top scorer: Mattias Käit (14)
- FIFA code: EST
First colours	Second colours

Biggest win
- Estonia 7–0 Liechtenstein (Tallinn, Estonia; 22 April 2019)

Biggest defeat
- Denmark 8–0 Estonia (Buftea, Romania; 29 October 2022)

European U-17 Championships
- Appearances: 1 (first in 2026)
- Best result: TBD

FIFA U-17 World Cup
- Appearances: None

The Estonia national under-17 football team represents Estonia in association football at the under-17 youth level, and is controlled by the Estonian Football Association.

== Competition history ==
=== UEFA European Under-17 Championship ===
Year	Round	Pld	W	D	L	GF	GA	Squad
(Denmark) 2002	Did not qualify							
(Portugal) 2003	Did not qualify							
(France) 2004	Did not qualify							
(Italy) 2005	Did not qualify							
(Luxembourg) 2006	Did not qualify							
(Belgium) 2007	Did not qualify							
(Turkey) 2008	Did not qualify							
(Germany) 2009	Did not qualify							
(Liechtenstein) 2010	Did not qualify							
(Serbia) 2011	Did not qualify							
(Slovenia) 2012	Did not qualify							
(Slovakia) 2013	Did not qualify							
(Malta) 2014	Did not qualify							
(Bulgaria) 2015	Did not qualify							
(Azerbaijan) 2016	Did not qualify							
(Croatia) 2017	Did not qualify							
(England) 2018	Did not qualify							
(Republic of Ireland) 2019	Did not qualify							
(Estonia) ~~2020~~	Cancelled due to COVID-19 pandemic							
(Cyprus) ~~2021~~	Cancelled due to COVID-19 pandemic							
(Israel) 2022	Did not qualify							
(Hungary) 2023	Did not qualify							
(Cyprus) 2024	Did not qualify							
(Albania) 2025	Did not qualify							
(Estonia) 2026	Group stage	3	0	0	3	2	8	Squad
(Latvia) 2027	To be determined							
(Lithuania) 2028	To be determined							
(Moldova) 2029	To be determined							
Total:1/23	Group stage	3	0	0	3	2	8	-

== Players ==
=== Current squad ===
The following players were called up for the 2026 UEFA European Under-17 Championship.

No.	Pos.	Player	Date of birth (age)	Club
1	GK	Harly Ollin	23 August 2009 (age 17)	(Estonian Football Association) Harju
12	GK	Sander Karlsson	10 November 2009 (age 16)	(Swedish Football Association) Hammarby Talang FF
2	DF	Andreas Poder	26 February 2009 (age 17)	(Estonian Football Association) Flora
3	DF	Carl Koit	14 November 2009 (age 16)	(Swedish Football Association) Norsborg
4	DF	Ronald Sammul	23 March 2009 (age 17)	(Estonian Football Association) Flora
13	DF	Ron Neltsas	20 May 2009 (age 17)	(Estonian Football Association) Elva
5	DF	Karel Isok	1 June 2009 (age 17)	(Estonian Football Association) Flora
6	DF	Uku Viiroja	1 July 2009 (age 17)	(Estonian Football Association) Flora
15	DF	Uku Nomm	5 June 2009 (age 17)	(Estonian Football Association) Vaprus
8	MF	Jaron Slim	10 March 2009 (age 17)	(Estonian Football Association) Flora
14	MF	Ricardo Kranberg	1 January 2010 (age 16)	(Estonian Football Association) Nõmme United
10	MF	Robert Mihhalevski	10 January 2009 (age 17)	(Football Association of Finland) HJK
7	FW	Robert Kaasik	8 January 2009 (age 17)	(Football Association of Finland) Honka
21	FW	Andero Kaares	29 June 2009 (age 17)	(Estonian Football Association) Flora
19	FW	Aston Visse	14 February 2009 (age 17)	(Estonian Football Association) Kuressaare
9	FW	Uku Korjus	14 February 2010 (age 16)	(Estonian Football Association) Flora
11	FW	Karl-Tristan Lorenz	2 June 2009 (age 17)	(Estonian Football Association) Flora
18	FW	Artjom Timakov	1 January 2010 (age 16)	(Estonian Football Association) FCI Levadia
20	FW	Kert Tomingas	15 January 2009 (age 17)	(Estonian Football Association) Nõmme United
23	FW	Johannes Oja	12 January 2009 (age 17)	(Royal Spanish Football Federation) Albacete

== Honours and achievements ==
Under-17 Baltic Cup
Winners (3): 2009, 2014, 2017

== See also ==
- Estonia men's national football team
- Estonia men's national under-21 football team
- Estonia men's national under-19 football team
- Estonia men's national youth football team
- Estonia women's national football team
- Estonia women's national under-17 football team
