= 2014 Esiliiga =

Estonian football league season for second division

Esiliiga
- Season: 2014
- Champions: Flora II Tallinn
- Promoted: Pärnu Linnameeskond; Tulevik Viljandi
- Relegated: Vaprus Vändra; Puuma Tallinn
- Matches played: 180
- Goals scored: 731 (4.06 per match)
- Top goalscorer: Kristen Saarts (31 goals)
- Biggest home win: Vaprus Vändra 13–1 Puuma Tallinn (9 November 2014)
- Biggest away win: Puuma Tallinn 0–5 Flora II Tallinn (6 July 2014); Puuma Tallinn 2–7 Levadia II Tallinn (27 July 2014); Kuressaare 2–7 Levadia II Tallinn (20 August 2014); Puuma Tallinn 1–6 Pärnu Linnameeskond (21 September 2014); Pärnu Linnameeskond 0–5 Levadia II Tallinn (27 September 2014); Puuma Tallinn 0–5 Nõmme Kalju II (2 November 2014)
- Highest scoring: Vaprus Vändra 13–1 Puuma Tallinn (9 November 2014)
- Longest winning run: Pärnu Linnameeskond (6 games)
- Longest unbeaten run: Flora II Tallinn (10 games)
- Longest winless run: Puuma Tallinn (14 games)
- Longest losing run: Puuma Tallinn (12 games)

The 2014 Esiliiga was the 24th season of the Esiliiga. The season started on Sunday 2 March 2014, and concluded on Sunday 9 November 2014. Flora II Tallinn won the Esiliiga, finishing with 78 points.

== Teams ==
A total of 10 teams contested the league, including 7 teams from the 2013 season. The 2013 runners-up Lokomotiv Jõhvi were promoted to Meistriliiga, while 9th place Puuma Tallinn and 10th place Irbis Kiviõli escaped relegation due to dissolving of 5th place Tartu SK 10 and 6th place Tammeka II Tartu. For this season those three teams will be replaced by the Meistriliiga relegated Kuressaare and Esiliiga B promoted Nõmme Kalju II and Pärnu Linnameeskond. The previous runners-up Tarvas Rakvere failed to win a promotion, losing the promotion play-off, while 8th placed Tulevik Viljandi managed to avoid relegation by winning the relegation play-off.

=== Stadiums and locations ===
Location of the 2014 Esiliiga teams

Team	Location	Stadium	Capacity
Flora II Tallinn	Tallinn	Sportland Arena	600
Irbis Kiviõli	Kiviõli	Kiviõli Stadium	255
Kuressaare	Kuressaare	Kuressaare linnastaadion	2,000
Levadia II Tallinn	Tallinn	Maarjamäe Stadium	1,000
Nõmme Kalju II	Tallinn	Hiiu Stadium	300
Pärnu Linnameeskond	Pärnu	Pärnu Kalev Stadium	1,000
Puuma Tallinn	Tallinn	Lasnamäe SPK Stadium	666
Tarvas Rakvere	Rakvere	Rakvere linnastaadion	2,500
Tulevik Viljandi	Viljandi	Viljandi linnastaadion	2,506
Vaprus Vändra	Vändra	Vändra Stadium	277

=== Personnel and kits ===
Note: Flags indicate national team as has been defined under FIFA eligibility rules. Players and Managers may hold more than one non-FIFA nationality.

Team	Manager	Captain	Kit manufacturer	Shirt sponsor
Flora II Tallinn	(Estonia) Jürgen Henn	(Estonia) Ragnar Piir	Nike	Tele2
Irbis Kiviõli	(Estonia) Erik Šteinberg	(Estonia) Dmitri Kirilov	Adidas	
Kuressaare	(Estonia) Pelle Pohlak	(Estonia) Sander Viira	Joma	Saaremaa Lihatööstus
Levadia II Tallinn	(Estonia) Argo Arbeiter	(Estonia) Kristjan Tamme	Adidas	Viimsi Keevitus
Nõmme Kalju II	(Estonia) Zaur Tšilingarašvili	(Estonia) Martin Mägi	Adidas	Optibet
Pärnu Linnameeskond	(Estonia) Gert Olesk	(Estonia) Taavi Kitsel	Adidas	
Puuma Tallinn	(Estonia) Aivar Tiidus	(Lithuania) Vitas Mališauskas	Adidas	
Tarvas Rakvere	(Estonia) Valeri Bondarenko	(Estonia) Alari Tovstik	Joma	Aqva
Tulevik Viljandi	(Estonia) Aivar Lillevere	(Estonia) Raiko Mutle	Joma	
Vaprus Vändra	(Estonia) Ranet Lepik	(Estonia) Karel Otto	Macron	

=== Managerial changes ===
Team	Outgoing manager	Manner of departure	Date of vacancy	Position in table	Replaced by	Date of appointment
Puuma Tallinn	(Russia) Dmitri Krasilnikov	Contract expired	31 December 2013	Pre-season	(Estonia) Aivar Tiidus	1 January 2014
Kuressaare	(Estonia) Sergei Zamogilnõi	Mutual consent	7 January 2014	Pre-season	(Estonia) Pelle Pohlak	8 January 2014
Tarvas Rakvere	(Estonia) Reijo Kuusik	Mutual consent	3 July 2014	7th	(Estonia) Valeri Bondarenko	3 July 2014

== League table ==
Pos	Team	Pld	W	D	L	GF	GA	GD	Pts	Promotion or relegation
1	Flora II Tallinn (Note: Reserve teams are ineligible for promotion.) (C)	36	24	6	6	104	40	+64	78	
2	Levadia II Tallinn	36	20	8	8	102	52	+50	68	
3	Pärnu Linnameeskond (P)	36	19	3	14	109	78	+31	60	Promotion to Meistriliiga
4	Nõmme Kalju II	36	17	6	13	69	62	+7	57	
5	Tulevik Viljandi (P)	36	14	9	13	53	51	+2	51	Qualification for promotion play-offs
6	Kuressaare	36	14	5	17	69	81	−12	47	
7	Irbis Kiviõli	36	12	11	13	72	82	−10	47	
8	Tarvas Rakvere (O)	36	12	10	14	61	65	−4	46	Qualification for relegation play-offs
9	Vaprus Vändra (R)	36	11	5	20	60	72	−12	38	Relegation to Esiliiga B
10	Puuma Tallinn (Note: Puuma Tallinn were deducted 3 points for not filling licensing criteria.) (R)	36	2	7	27	32	148	−116	10	Relegation to Esiliiga B

Source: Estonian Football Association (in Estonian)
Rules for classification: Points; Least withdrawals or annulled matches; Overall wins; Head-to-head points; Head-to-head goal difference; Goal difference; Goals scored.
(C) Champions; (O) Play-off winners; (P) Promoted; (R) Relegated

=== Promotion play-offs ===
Tulevik Viljandi, who finished 5th, faced Lokomotiv Jõhvi, the 9th-placed 2014 Meistriliiga side for a two-legged play-off. The winner on aggregate score after both matches will earn a spot in the 2015 Meistriliiga. Tulevik Viljandi won 1–1 on aggregate.

16 November 2014
13:00 (UTC+3)

Tulevik Viljandi	0–0	Lokomotiv Jõhvi
	Report

Viljandi linnastaadion, Viljandi
Attendance: 260
Referee: Kristo Tohver
22 November 2014
13:00 (UTC+3)

Lokomotiv Jõhvi	1–1	Tulevik Viljandi
Yablokov 52'	Report	Ilves 71'

Ahtme Stadium, Kohtla-Järve
Attendance: 96
Referee: Eiko Saar

=== Relegation play-offs ===
Tarvas Rakvere remained in Esiliiga after HÜJK Emmaste voluntarily declined joining the league.

== Season statistics ==
=== Top scorers ===
Rank	Player	Team	Goals
1	(Estonia) Kristen Saarts	Pärnu Linnameeskond/Levadia II Tallinn	31
2	(Estonia) Henri Hanson	Pärnu Linnameeskond	25
3	(Estonia) Martin Kase	Flora II Tallinn	24
4	(Estonia) Sergei Akimov	Tarvas Rakvere	21
5	(Estonia) Anton Issakov	Pärnu Linnameeskond	17
6	(Estonia) Aleksei Mamontov	Irbis Kiviõli	16
7	(Estonia) Mark Oliver Roosnupp	Levadia II Tallinn	15
8	(Estonia) Peeter Klein	Nõmme Kalju II	14
8	(Estonia) Rasmus Peetson	Pärnu Linnameeskond/Levadia II Tallinn	14
10	(Estonia) Aleksandr Pruttšenko	Irbis Kiviõli	12

== Monthly awards ==
Month	Manager of the Month		Player of the Month	
Month	Manager	Club	Player	Club
March	(Estonia) Argo Arbeiter	Levadia II Tallinn	(Estonia) Kristen Saarts	Pärnu Linnameeskond
April	(Estonia) Jürgen Henn	Flora II Tallinn	(Estonia) Erkki Kubber	Flora II Tallinn
May	(Estonia) Pelle Pohlak	Kuressaare	(Estonia) Indrek Ilves	Tulevik Viljandi
June	(Estonia) Gert Olesk	Pärnu Linnameeskond	(Estonia) Marek Šatov	Irbis Kiviõli
July	(Estonia) Aivar Lillevere	Tulevik Viljandi	(Estonia) Sander Laht	Kuressaare
August	(Estonia) Aivar Lillevere	Tulevik Viljandi	(Estonia) Joseph Saliste	Flora II Tallinn
September	(Estonia) Erik Šteinberg	Irbis Kiviõli	(Estonia) Madis Vihmann	Levadia II Tallinn
October	(Estonia) Jürgen Henn	Flora II Tallinn	(Estonia) Sören Kaldma	Nõmme Kalju II

== See also ==
- 2013–14 Estonian Cup
- 2014–15 Estonian Cup
- 2014 Meistriliiga
- 2014 Esiliiga B
