= List of football stadiums in Estonia =

The following is a list of football stadiums in Estonia, ranked in order of seating capacity, with the minimum capacity being 500.

== Current stadiums ==
#	Image	Stadium	Capacity	City	Home team	UEFA rank
1		A. Le Coq Arena	14,336	Tallinn	Estonia, FC Flora, FCI Levadia	4/4 stars
2		Kalevi Keskstaadion	11,842	Tallinn		
3		Kadriorg Stadium	5,000	Tallinn	under renovation	
4		Tehvandi Stadium	3,200	Otepää	FC Otepää, FC Elva	2/4 stars
5		Kuressaare linnastaadion	2,000	Kuressaare	FC Kuressaare	
6		Rakvere linnastaadion	1,831	Rakvere	Rakvere JK Tarvas	
7		Tamme Stadium	1,750	Tartu	Tartu JK Tammeka	2/4 stars
8		Stadium of Tartu University	1,700	Tartu		
9		Tabasalu Arena	1,630	Tabasalu	JK Tabasalu	
10		Pirita Velodrome	1,602	Tallinn		
11		Võru Stadium	1,600	Võru	Võru FC Helios	
12		Pärnu Rannastaadion	1,501	Pärnu	Pärnu JK Vaprus	2/4 stars
13		Sportland Arena	1,198	Tallinn	JK Tallinna Kalev, FC Flora (during winter), FCI Levadia (during winter)	
14		Haapsalu linnastaadion	1,080	Haapsalu	Läänemaa JK	
15		Viljandi linnastaadion	1,068	Viljandi	Viljandi JK Tulevik	
16		Narva Kreenholm Stadium	1,065	Narva		
17		Viimsi Stadium	1,006	Viimsi	Viimsi JK	
18		Narva Kalev-Fama Stadium	1,000	Narva	JK Narva Trans	
19		Sillamäe Kalevi Stadium	800	Sillamäe	under renovation	
20		Heino Lipp Stadium	794	Jõhvi	Jõhvi FC Phoenix	
21		Annelinna Stadium	656	Tartu	FC Helios Tartu	
22		Holm Jalgpallipark	580	Tartu	Tartu JK Welco	
23		Hiiu Stadium	570	Tallinn	Nõmme Kalju FC	
24		Kose Stadium	562	Kose	FC Kose	
25		Paide kunstmuruväljak	542	Paide	Paide Linnameeskond	
26		Jõhvi linnastaadion	540	Jõhvi		
27		Coop staadion	504	Tartu	Tartu JK Tammeka (during winter)	
28		Männiku Stadium	500	Tallinn	FC Nõmme United	
29		Laagri Stadium	500	Laagri	Harju JK Laagri, Saue JK (during winter)	
30		Paide linnastaadion	500	Paide		
31		Maardu Linnastaadion	500	Maardu	Maardu Linnameeskond	
32		Pärnu Raeküla Stadium	500	Pärnu	Pärnu JK Poseidon	
33		Türi linnastaadion	500	Türi	Türi Ganvix JK	

== Future stadiums ==
Stadiums which are currently under construction/renovation or in development:

Stadium	Capacity	City	Home team	Opening	Notes
Kadriorg Stadium	5,000	Tallinn		2028	For Kadriorg Stadium's 100th birthday, Tallinn will renovate the complex for €20 million, during which they will refurbish the historic grandstand and construct a new stand on the opposite side of the field.
Sportland Arena	4,500	Tallinn	Estonia (during winter)	TBD	The future of Sportland Arena will see the stadium have a capacity of 4,500, so it would be eligible for the UEFA Stadium Category 3 certificate and would thus be able to host international matches.
Paide Stadium	4,500	Paide	Paide Linnameeskond	TBD	In October 2021, Paide Linnameeskond initially announced plans to construct a new 2,000-seat stadium, but in 2025, the project was expanded to include at least 4,500 seats. The stadium is set to cost 15 to 20 million euros. The construction of the first stand is set to begin in early 2027.

== Indoor football facilities ==
List of indoor football halls in Estonia:

Picture	Stadium	Location	Field's size (m)	County	Year opened	Ref
	EJL Jalgpallihall	Tallinn	100 × 64 (m)	Harju County	2013	
	Raja Jalgpallihall	Tallinn	105 × 68 (m)	Harju County	2024	
	Sõle Jalgpallihall	Tallinn	104 × 68 (m)	Harju County	2016	
	Annemõisa Jalgpallihall	Tartu	100 × 64 (m)	Tartu County	2022	
	Narva Jalgpallihall	Narva	100 × 64 (m)	Ida-Viru County	2024	
	Pärnu Jalgpallihall	Pärnu	100 × 64 (m)	Pärnu County	2023	
	Viimsi Jalgpalli- ja Kergejõustikuhall	Viimsi	100 × 64 (m)	Harju County	2025	
	Männimäe Jalgpallihall	Viljandi	100 × 64 (m)	Viljandi County	2021	
	Bauroc Rakvere Jalgpallihall	Rakvere	100 × 64 (m)	Lääne-Viru County	2026	
	Saaremaa Nooruse Hall	Kuressaare	100 × 64 (m)	Saare County	2024	
	Uuemõisa Jalgpallihall	Haapsalu	100 × 64 (m)	Lääne County	2021	
	Paide Jalgpallihall	Paide	100 × 64 (m)	Järva County	2024	
	Rapla Jalgpallihall	Rapla	100 × 64 (m)	Rapla County	2022	
	Männiku Jalgpallikeskus	Tallinn	90 × 60 (m)	Harju County	2009	
	Kindluse Spordikompleksi Jalgpallihall	Rae	79 × 49 (m)	Harju County	2021	
	Kotka Hall	Tallinn	70 × 50 (m)	Harju County	2006	

== See also ==
- List of European stadiums by capacity
- List of association football stadiums by capacity
- Lists of stadiums
