= Andreas Raudsepp =

Estonian footballer

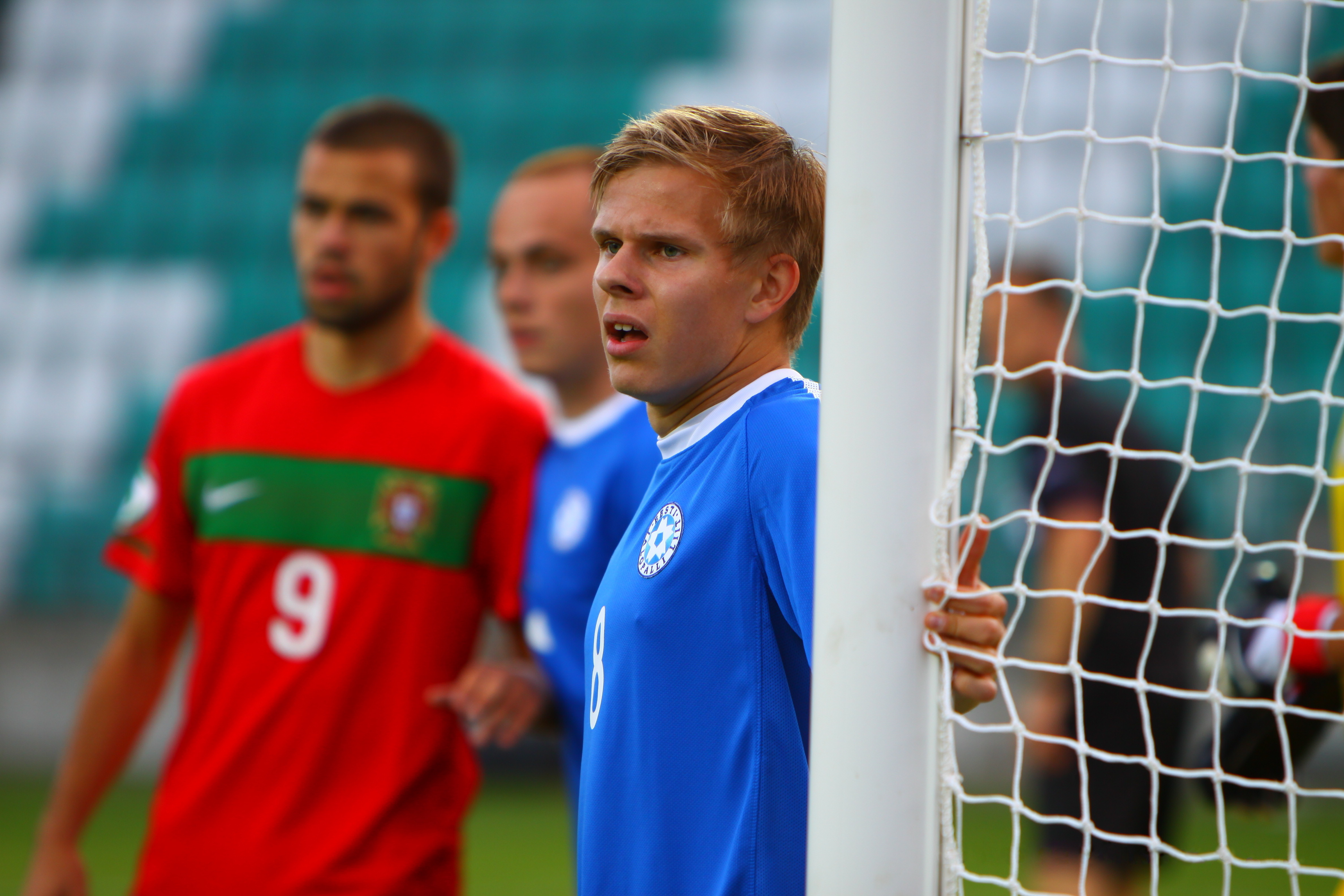
- Raudsepp playing for Estonia U19 at the 2012 UEFA European Under-19 Championship

Personal information
- Full name: Andreas Raudsepp
- Date of birth: 13 December 1993 (age 32)
- Place of birth: Rakvere, Estonia
- Height: 1.70 m (5 ft 7 in)
- Position: Midfielder

Youth career
- 2005: Kotkas
- 2007–2010: Levadia

Senior career*
Years	Team	Apps	(Gls)
2009–2017	Levadia U21	45	(4)
2011–2018	Levadia	135	(7)
2010	→ Tulevik (loan)	9	(1)
2010	→ Warrior (loan)	1	(0)
2018–2019	Tallinna Kalev	67	(4)
2020	Nõmme Kalju	12	(0)

International career^{‡}
2008	Estonia U16	1	(0)
2009	Estonia U17	11	(0)
2009	Estonia U18	1	(0)
2010–2012	Estonia U19	28	(0)
2012–2014	Estonia U21	20	(0)
2016	Estonia U23	1	(0)
2014–2016	Estonia	7	(0)
- * Club domestic league appearances and goals as of 20:42, 29 January 2021 (UTC) ‡ National team caps and goals as of 18 November 2016

Andreas Raudsepp (born 13 December 1993) is an Estonian professional footballer who plays as a midfielder.

== Club career ==
Raudsepp joined the Levadia Football Academy in 2007. In 2010, he was loaned out to Tulevik and made his Meistriliiga debut on 10 July 2010 against his parent club Levadia. He made his debut for Levadia on 27 August 2011 in a 0–3 away win against Paide Linnameeskond.

== International career ==
Raudsepp represented Estonia in the 2012 UEFA European Under-19 Championship. He made his international debut for the senior national team on 27 December 2014 against Qatar.

== Career statistics ==
=== Club ===
As of 18 November 2016.

Club	Season	League			Cup		Europe		Other		Total	
Club	Season	Division	Apps	Goals	Apps	Goals	Apps	Goals	Apps	Goals	Apps	Goals
Levadia U21	2009	Esiliiga	11	2	0	0	—		0	0	11	2
Levadia U21	2010	Esiliiga	5	0	0	0	—		0	0	5	0
Levadia U21	2011	Esiliiga	29	3	0	0	—		0	0	29	3
Levadia U21	2012	Esiliiga	9	0	0	0	—		0	0	9	0
Levadia U21	2013	Esiliiga	1	0	0	0	—		0	0	1	0
Levadia U21	2014	Esiliiga	1	1	0	0	—		0	0	1	1
Levadia U21	2015	Esiliiga	1	0	0	0	—		0	0	1	0
Levadia U21	2016	Esiliiga	1	0	0	0	—		0	0	1	0
Levadia U21	Total		58	6	0	0	0	0	0	0	58	6
Levadia	2011	Meistriliiga	2	0	0	0	0	0	0	0	2	0
Levadia	2012	Meistriliiga	21	1	6	1	0	0	0	0	27	2
Levadia	2013	Meistriliiga	28	2	2	0	4	0	1	0	35	2
Levadia	2014	Meistriliiga	24	2	3	0	3	0	1	0	31	2
Levadia	2015	Meistriliiga	8	1	2	0	0	0	1	0	11	1
Levadia	2016	Meistriliiga	25	0	3	0	3	0	0	0	31	0
Levadia	Total		108	6	16	1	10	0	3	0	137	7
Warrior (loan)	2010	Esiliiga	1	0	0	0	—		0	0	1	0
Tulevik (loan)	2010	Meistriliiga	9	1	2	0	—		0	0	11	1
Career total			176	13	18	1	10	0	3	0	207	14

=== International ===
As of 18 November 2016.

National team	Year	Apps	Goals
Estonia
Estonia	2014	1	0
Estonia	2015	1	0
Estonia	2016	5	0
Total		7	0

== Honours ==
=== Club ===
Levadia

- Meistriliiga: 2013, 2014
- Estonian Cup: 2011–12, 2013–14
- Estonian Supercup: 2013, 2015
