= 2026 Esiliiga B =

Esiliiga B
- Season: 2026
- Dates: 7 March – 8 November 2026
- Champions: Narva Trans U21
- Promoted: Phoenix; Tammeka U21
- Relegated: Legion
- Matches: 180
- Goals: 779 (4.33 per match)
- Top goalscorer: Karl Kiidron (22 goals)
- Biggest home win: Tammeka U21 12–0 Legion (9 May 2026); Vaprus U21 12–0 Legion (18 September 2026)
- Biggest away win: Legion 0–6 Tartu Kalev (24 May 2026); Tabasalu 2–8 Vaprus U21 (5 July 2026)
- Highest scoring: Tammeka U21 12–0 Legion (9 May 2026); Tartu Kalev 10–2 Legion (12 July 2026); Vaprus U21 12–0 Legion (18 September 2026)
- Longest winning run: 7 matches Tulevik; FCI Levadia U19; Narva Trans U21
- Longest unbeaten run: 10 matches Narva Trans U21
- Longest winless run: 14 matches Legion
- Longest losing run: 6 matches Legion

The 2026 Esiliiga B was the fourteenth season of the Esiliiga B. The season began on 7 March 2026 and concluded on 8 November 2026.

== Teams ==
The league consisted of ten teams; five teams remaining from the previous season, three teams promoted from the II liiga, and two teams relegated from the Esiliiga.

The promoted teams were the 2025 II liiga A champions Vaprus U21, runners-up FCI Levadia U19, and 2025 Esiliiga B play-off winners Tulevik. They replaced the Esiliiga B play-off losers Paide Linnameeskond U21, and Esiliiga B bottom two teams Kuressaare U21 and Läänemaa.

The relegated teams were the 2025 Esiliiga bottom two teams Tallinna Kalev U21 and Tammeka U21. They replaced the 2025 Esiliiga B champions Maardu Linnameeskond and runners-up Nõmme United U21.

=== Stadiums and locations ===
Locations of the 2026 Esiliiga B teams

Team	Location	Stadium	Capacity
FCI Levadia U19	Tallinn	Maarjamäe Artificial Turf	30
Legion	Tallinn	Wismari Stadium	–
Narva Trans U21	Narva	Narva Kalev-Fama Stadium	1,000
Phoenix	Jõhvi	Heino Lipp Stadium	808
Tabasalu	Tabasalu	Tabasalu Arena	1,630
Tallinna Kalev U21	Jüri	Jüri Stadium	–
Tammeka U21	Tartu	Tartu Coop Stadium	504
Tartu Kalev	Ülenurme	Ülenurme Stadium	312
Tulevik	Viljandi	Viljandi Linnastaadion	1,068
Vaprus U21	Pärnu	Pärnu Rannastaadion	1,501

== League table ==
Pos	Team	Pld	W	D	L	GF	GA	GD	Pts	Promotion, qualification or relegation
1	Narva Trans U21 (Note: Ineligible for promotion after relegation of senior team Narva Trans to the 2027 Esiliiga from the 2026 Meistriliiga) (C)	36	24	4	8	80	41	+39	76	
2	FCI Levadia U19 (Note: Ineligible for promotion as a league below senior team FCI Levadia U21)	36	22	3	11	88	60	+28	69	
3	Tammeka U21 (P)	36	20	4	12	97	67	+30	64	Promotion to the Esiliiga
4	Phoenix (P)	36	20	3	13	86	78	+8	63	Promotion to the Esiliiga
5	Tulevik (Q)	36	17	5	14	90	76	+14	56	Qualification for the Esiliiga play-off
6	Vaprus U21	36	16	5	15	105	74	+31	53	
7	Tartu Kalev	36	16	2	18	80	71	+9	50	
8	Tabasalu	36	11	5	20	50	89	−39	38	
9	Tallinna Kalev U21 (Q)	36	9	6	21	70	90	−20	33	Qualification for the Esiliiga B play-off
10	Legion (R)	36	5	3	28	33	133	−100	18	Relegation to the II liiga

Source: Esiliiga B
Rules for classification: 1) Points; 2) Less matches awarded against; 3) Head-to-head points; 4) Head-to-head goal difference; 5) Matches won; 6) Goal difference; 7) Goals scored; 8) Away goals scored; 9) Fair-play points; 10) Draw
(C) Champions; (P) Promoted; (Q) Qualified for the phase indicated; (R) Relegated

== Results ==
Home \ Away	FCI	LEG	NAR	PHO	TAB	TAL	TAM	TAR	TUL	VAP
FCI Levadia U19		6–0	0–4	2–0	0–2	4–1	3–2	3–1	2–5	2–0
FCI Levadia U19		1–0	1–0	6–2	3–0	3–1	1–0	0–5	3–5	3–2
Legion	0–2		1–3	0–1	3–2	2–3	1–2	0–6	0–3	1–4
Legion	0–3		1–2	0–4	2–0	3–0	0–3 (Note: Tammeka U21 awarded a 0–3 win after Legion abandoned match while in progress.)	1–2	1–2	1–5
Narva Trans U21	4–4	5–0		1–1	5–0	3–1	4–1	3–2	2–1	5–0
Narva Trans U21	1–0	0–3		1–0	4–0	5–0	1–0	2–0	2–1	4–1
Phoenix	4–3	2–1	4–2		1–2	2–1	2–4	4–3	5–4	4–3
Phoenix	4–1	6–1	0–1		3–2	4–3	1–3	3–2	6–1	4–2
Tabasalu	0–5	2–3	1–0	2–1		2–1	3–2	3–1	2–0	1–2
Tabasalu	1–1	1–1	0–0	2–2		1–1	1–2	2–1	1–2	2–8
Tallinna Kalev U21	0–5	5–1	2–3	1–2	2–3		0–1	7–2	1–2	2–3
Tallinna Kalev U21	1–1	3–3	1–2	3–1	4–1		2–3	3–2	2–1	1–1
Tammeka U21	2–1	12–0	2–1	6–1	4–3	3–2		0–1	3–1	3–2
Tammeka U21	2–5	11–0	2–1	2–3	1–3	5–4		4–1	3–2	2–2
Tartu Kalev	2–0	1–0	3–0	0–3	4–0	1–3	2–2		3–4	1–2
Tartu Kalev	0–2	10–2	0–1	4–0	3–1	1–1	2–1		4–2	1–0
Tulevik	2–3	5–0	0–1	4–2	6–1	4–3	2–2	1–3		5–3
Tulevik	1–4	3–0	3–3	0–0	3–2	1–3	0–0	6–1		3–1
Vaprus U21	4–2	1–1	4–0	3–1	6–0	2–2	7–2	5–1	2–2	
Vaprus U21	2–3	12–0	1–4	2–3	2–1	7–0	2–0	0–4	2–3	

Source: Esiliiga B
Legend: Blue = home team win; Yellow = draw; Red = away team win.

== Esiliiga B play-off ==
The ninth-placed team (Tallinna Kalev U21) will face the fourth-placed team of the 2026 II liiga A (Viimsi U21) for the final place in the 2027 Esiliiga B (Esiliiga B spot passed down from eighth-place after Maardu Linnameeskond's withdrawal from the 2026 Esiliiga, and II liiga A spot passed down from third-place after third-placed team Tallinna Placet declined promotion).

=== First leg ===
21 November 2026	Viimsi U21	2–2	Tallinna Kalev U21	Haabneeme
11:00 BST	Kollist 45+4'; Tull 89'		Kubensky 45'; Lasn 45+1'	Stadium: Viimsi Stadium

=== Second leg ===
27 November 2026	Tallinna Kalev U21	v	Viimsi U21	Tallinn
17:30 BST				Stadium: Kalevi Keskstaadioni kunstmuruväljak

== Season statistics ==
=== Top scorers ===
Rank	Player	Club	Goals
1	(Estonia) Karl Kiidron	Tammeka U21	22
2	(Estonia) Kerdo Kutsar	Vaprus U21	21
2	(Estonia) Kaimar Saag	Tulevik	21
4	(Estonia) Robin Mathias Müür	Tammeka U21	16
5	(Estonia) Aleksandr Jegorov	Narva Trans U21	15
5	(Estonia) Ako Henno Kõrre	Vaprus U21	15
5	(Estonia) Gregor Kruusla	Tartu Kalev	15
5	(Estonia) Eric Levit	Tulevik	15
5	(Estonia) Mauris Villems	Tartu Kalev	15
10	(Estonia) Ingo Ott	Tulevik	14

== Awards ==
=== Monthly awards ===
Month	Player of the Month		Manager of the Month	
Month	Player	Club	Manager	Club
March	(Estonia) Karl Kiidron	Tammeka U21	(Estonia) Rait Oja	Tulevik
April	(Estonia) Nikita Baljabkin	Narva Trans U21	(Estonia) Maksim Gruznov	Narva Trans U21
May	(Estonia) Geron Vidder	Tulevik	(Estonia) Rait Oja	Tulevik
June/July	(Estonia) Arti Viinapuu	Tammeka U21	(Estonia) Maksim Rõtškov	FCI Levadia U19
August	(Estonia) Pavel Bogatov	FCI Levadia U19	(Estonia) Maksim Rõtškov	FCI Levadia U19
September	(Estonia) Kaimar Saag	Tulevik	(Estonia) Maksim Gruznov	Narva Trans U21
October	(Estonia) Hugo Sõnitsar	FCI Levadia U19	(Estonia) Marti Pähn	Tammeka U21

== See also ==
- 2026 Meistriliiga
- 2026 Esiliiga
- 2025–26 Estonian Cup
- 2026–27 Estonian Cup
