= 2013 Esiliiga =

Estonian football league season for second division

Esiliiga
- Season: 2013
- Champions: Levadia II
- Promoted: Lokomotiv
- Relegated: Puuma; Irbis
- Matches: 180
- Goals: 633 (3.52 per match)
- Top goalscorer: Tõnis Starkopf (28 goals)
- Biggest home win: Tammeka II 10–0 Puuma (10 November)
- Biggest away win: Tulevik 0–7 Levadia II (28 July)
- Highest scoring: Irbis 5-7 Lokomotiv (18 September)

The 2013 season of the Esiliiga, the second level in the Estonian football system, is the twenty-third season in the league's history. The season officially began on 3 March 2013 and ended on 10 November 2013. However, on 3 March the Estonian Football Association announced that all matches scheduled for 3 March 2013 would be postponed due to heavy snowfall. The previous league champions Infonet were promoted to Meistriliiga while Pärnu Linnameeskond and Kohtla-Järve Lootus were relegated to Esiliiga B division. For this season those three teams are replaced by Jõhvi Lokomotiv from II Liiga East/North division and Viljandi Tulevik and Vändra Vaprus from II Liiga West/South division.

== Teams ==
=== Stadiums and locations ===
Location of the 2013 Esiliiga teams

Team	Location	Stadium	Capacity
Flora II	Tallinn	Sportland Arena	600
Kiviõli Irbis	Kiviõli	Kiviõli Stadium	255
Levadia II	Tallinn	Maarjamäe Stadium	1,000
Jõhvi Lokomotiv	Jõhvi	Jõhvi Stadium	500
Puuma	Tallinn	Lasnamäe SPK Stadium	666
Tartu SK 10	Tartu	Tamme Stadium	1,500
Tammeka II	Tartu	Tamme Stadium	1,500
Rakvere Tarvas	Rakvere	Rakvere Stadium	2,500
Viljandi Tulevik	Viljandi	Viljandi Stadium	2,506
Vändra Vaprus	Vändra	Vändra Stadium	277

=== Personnel and kits ===
Note: Flags indicate national team as has been defined under FIFA eligibility rules. Players and Managers may hold more than one non-FIFA nationality.

Team	Manager	Captain	Kit manufacturer	Shirt sponsor
Flora II	(Estonia) Jürgen Henn	(Estonia) Erkki Kubber	Nike	
Kiviõli Irbis	(Estonia) Erik Šteinberg	(Estonia) Tõnis Starkopf	Adidas	
Levadia II	(Estonia) Argo Arbeiter	(Estonia) Kristjan Tamme	Adidas	Viimsi Keevitus
Jõhvi Lokomotiv	(Latvia) Viktors Ņesterenko	(Estonia) Boriss Gritsjuk	Uhlsport	Spacecom
Puuma	(Russia) Dmitri Krasilnikov	(Estonia) Aleksandr Boldõrev	Adidas	Kruze Disain
Tartu SK 10	(Estonia) Andrei Borissov	(Estonia) Aleksandr Pruttšenko	Adidas	Ha Serv
Tammeka II	(Estonia) Indrek Koser	(Estonia) Ander Paabut	Nike	Metec
Rakvere Tarvas	(Estonia) Reijo Kuusik	(Estonia) Alari Tovstik	Joma	Aqva
Viljandi Tulevik	(Estonia) Aivar Lillevere	(Estonia) Raiko Mutle	Hummel	kalameister.ee
Vändra Vaprus	(Estonia) Ranet Lepik	(Estonia) Karel Otto	Macron	4teams

=== Managerial changes ===
Team	Outgoing manager	Manner of departure	Date of vacancy	Position in table	Replaced by	Date of appointment
Viljandi Tulevik	(Estonia) Raiko Mutle	Resigned	31 December 2012	Pre-season	(Estonia) Aivar Lillevere	8 January 2013
Tammeka II	(Estonia) Ivan O'Konnel-Bronin	Replaced	18 February 2013	Pre-season	(Estonia) Indrek Koser	18 February 2013
Flora II	(Estonia) Norbert Hurt	Signed by Flora	21 July 2013	7th	(Estonia) Jürgen Henn	21 July 2013

== League table ==
Pos	Team	Pld	W	D	L	GF	GA	GD	Pts	Promotion or relegation
1	Levadia II (Note: Reserve teams are ineligible for promotion.) (C)	36	20	10	6	94	41	+53	70	
2	Jõhvi Lokomotiv (P)	36	20	9	7	80	39	+41	69	Promotion to Meistriliiga
3	Flora II	36	17	6	13	56	54	+2	57	
4	Rakvere Tarvas	36	16	8	12	68	58	+10	56	Qualification for promotion play-offs
5	Tartu SK 10	36	17	3	16	58	67	−9	54	
6	Tammeka II	36	15	7	14	70	57	+13	52	
7	Vändra Vaprus	36	12	10	14	61	55	+6	46	
8	Viljandi Tulevik (O)	36	12	10	14	46	57	−11	46	Qualification for relegation play-offs
9	Puuma (R)	36	8	5	23	40	91	−51	29	Relegation to Esiliiga B
10	Kiviõli Irbis (R)	36	7	4	25	60	114	−54	25	Relegation to Esiliiga B

Source: Estonian Football Association (in Estonian)
Rules for classification: Points; Least withdrawals or annulled matches; Overall wins; Head-to-head points; Head-to-head goal difference; Goal difference; Goals scored.
If two or more teams on the top have the same number of points by the end of the season, the aforementioned rules will not apply and additional game(s) will be played to determine the champions.
(C) Champions; (O) Play-off winners; (P) Promoted; (R) Relegated

=== Promotion play-off ===
At season's end, the runners-up of the 2013 Esiliiga will participate in a two-legged play-off with the 9th place club of the 2013 Meistriliiga for the spot in next year's competition.

17 November 2013	Rakvere Tarvas	1–2	Tammeka	Rakvere
13:00 EET (GMT+2)	Rebane 80'	Report	Tekko 26'; Tomson 68'	Stadium: Rakvere Kunstmurustaadion; Attendance: 350; Referee: Jaan Roos

23 November 2013	Tammeka	4–1	Rakvere Tarvas	Valga
13:00 EET (GMT+2)	Tamm 10', 63'; Tovstik 13' (o.g.); Tomson 21'	Report	Hang 51'	Stadium: Valga Keskstaadion; Attendance: 174; Referee: Kristo Külljastinen

=== Relegation play-off ===
At season's end, the 8th place club of the 2013 Esiliiga will participate in a two-legged play-off with the 3rd place club of the 2013 Esiliiga B for the spot in next year's competition.

17 November 2013	Sillamäe Kalev II	1–4	Viljandi Tulevik	Sillamäe
13:00 EET (GMT+2)	Rando Leokin 72'	Report	Laansoo 19'; Peips 39'; Teor 48', 54'	Stadium: Sillamäe Kalev Kunstmurustaadion; Attendance: 65; Referee: Mart Martin

23 November 2013	Viljandi Tulevik	3–2	Sillamäe Kalev II	Viljandi
13:00 EET (GMT+2)	Teor 7', 20'; Luhakooder 13'	Report	Rando Leokin 40'; Mukhin 62'	Stadium: Viljandi Kunstmurustaadion; Attendance: 65; Referee: Miko Pupart

== Season statistics ==
=== Top goalscorers ===
As of 10 November 2013.

Rank	Player	Team	Goals
1	(Estonia) Tõnis Starkopf	Kiviõli Irbis	28
2	(Russia) Nikita Kolyaev	Levadia II	24
3	(Estonia) Andrei Jõgi	Jõhvi Lokomotiv	13
3	(Estonia) Henry Rohtla	Levadia II	13
3	(Estonia) Hannes Tiru	Tammeka II	13
6	(Russia) Maksim Bazyukin	Jõhvi Lokomotiv	12
7	(Estonia) Henri Hang	Rakvere Tarvas	11
7	(Estonia) Toomas Mangusson	Vändra Vaprus	11
7	(Estonia) Aleksandr Pruttšenko	Tartu SK 10	11
7	(Estonia) Rasmus Tauts	Tammeka II	11

== Awards ==
Month	Manager of the Month		Player of the Month	
Month	Manager	Club	Player	Club
March	(Estonia) Aivar Lillevere	Viljandi Tulevik	(Russia) Maksim Bazyukin	Jõhvi Lokomotiv
April	(Estonia) Argo Arbeiter	Levadia II	(Estonia) Eero Eessaar	Tartu SK 10
May	(Latvia) Viktors Ņesterenko	Jõhvi Lokomotiv	(Estonia) Raido Leokin	Flora II
June	(Latvia) Viktors Ņesterenko	Jõhvi Lokomotiv	(Estonia) Karli Kütt	Tammeka II
July	(Estonia) Norbert Hurt	Flora II	(Estonia) Alari Tovstik	Rakvere Tarvas
August	(Estonia) Indrek Koser	Tammeka II	(Estonia) Joonas Ljaš	Rakvere Tarvas
September	(Estonia) Ranet Lepik	Vändra Vaprus	(Estonia) Martin Kase	Flora II
October	(Estonia) Erik Šteinberg	Kiviõli Irbis	(Croatia) Silvio Philips	Tammeka II

== See also ==
- 2013 Meistriliiga
- 2013 Esiliiga B
- 2012–13 Estonian Cup
- 2013–14 Estonian Cup
