= Linnastaadion =

Linnastaadion may refer to:

- Elva linnastaadion
- Haapsalu linnastaadion
- Jõhvi linnastaadion
- Kuressaare linnastaadion
- Paide linnastaadion
- Rakvere linnastaadion
- Valga linnastaadion
- Viljandi linnastaadion
