= 2011 Esiliiga =

Estonian football league season for second division

Esiliiga
- Season: 2011
- Champions: JK Tallinna Kalev
- Relegated: Tallinna JK Legion, Valga Warrior
- Matches played: 180
- Goals scored: 686 (3.81 per match)
- Top goalscorer: (Estonia) Maksim Rõtškov (40 goals)

The 2011 season of the Esiliiga, the second level in the Estonian football system, is the 21st season in the league's history. It starts in March and ends in November. The defending champions are Levadia II, who were ineligible for promotion as they are the reserve team for Meistriliiga side Levadia.

== Overview ==
Location of the 2011 Esiliiga teams

Club	Location	Stadium	Current manager
Flora II	Tallinn	Sportland Arena	(Estonia) Norbert Hurt
Infonet	Tallinn	Lasnamäe kergejõustikuhalli kunstmuru	(Estonia) Aleksandr Puštov
Puuma	Tallinn	Lasnamäe SPK kunstmuruväljak	(Estonia) Vitaly Kobashov
Levadia II	Tallinn	Maarjamäe kunstmuru	(Estonia) Argo Arbeiter
Tallinna Kalev	Tallinn	Kalevi Keskstaadion	(Estonia) Sergei Ratnikov
FC Lootus	Kohtla-Järve	Spordikeskuse Staadion	(Estonia) Andrei Škaleta
Tamme Auto	Kiviõli	Kiviõli staadion	(Estonia) Erik Steinberg
TJK Legion	Tallinn	Wismari staadion	(Estonia) Viktor Passikuta
Warrior	Valga	Sportland Arena	(Estonia) Meelis Kuivits
Pärnu LM	Pärnu	Pärnu Kalevi staadion	(Estonia) Kalev Pajula

== League table ==
Pos	Team	Pld	W	D	L	GF	GA	GD	Pts	Qualification or relegation
1	JK Tallinna Kalev (C)	36	21	10	5	102	39	+63	73	Promotion to Meistriliiga
2	FC Infonet	36	19	11	6	101	47	+54	68	Qualification for promotion play-offs
3	Kiviõli Tamme Auto	36	21	4	11	73	61	+12	67	
4	FC Levadia II (Note: Reserve teams are ineligible for promotion.)	36	16	12	8	67	43	+24	60	
5	Tallinna FC Flora II	36	17	7	12	70	51	+19	58	
6	FC Puuma	36	15	9	12	81	72	+9	54	
7	Kohtla-Järve FC Lootus	36	9	11	16	59	75	−16	38	
8	Pärnu Linnameeskond	36	8	11	17	55	63	−8	35	Qualification for relegation play-offs
9	Tallinna JK Legion (R)	36	7	6	23	44	104	−60	27	Relegation to II liiga
10	Valga FC Warrior (R)	36	3	7	26	34	131	−97	16	Relegation to II liiga

(C) Champions; (R) Relegated

== Results ==
Each team plays every opponent four times, twice at home and twice on the road, for a total of 36 games.

== Season statistics ==
=== Top scorers ===
Rank	Player	Club	Goals
1	(Estonia) Maksim Rõtškov	Infonet	40
2	(Estonia) Rimo Hunt	Tallinna Kalev	35
3	(Estonia) Aleksei Mamontov	Kiviõli Tamme Auto	17
4	(Estonia) Trevor Elhi	Levadia II	14
4	(Estonia) Tõnis Starkopf	Kiviõli Tamme Auto	14
4	(Estonia) Sten Teino	Puuma	14
7	(Estonia) Ilja Antonov	Puuma	13
7	(Estonia) Nikita Tšernei	Puuma	13
9	(Finland) Ionel Armean	Tallinna Kalev	12
9	(Estonia) Andrei Jõgi	Kohtla-Järve Lootus	12
9	(Estonia) Rasmus Tomson	Tallinna Kalev	12

== Awards ==
=== Monthly awards ===
Month	Manager of the Month		Player of the Month	
Month	Manager	Club	Player	Club
March	(Estonia) Argo Arbeiter	Levadia II	(Estonia) Trevor Elhi	Levadia II
April	(Estonia) Aivar Lillevere	Flora II	(Estonia) Rimo Hunt	Tallinna Kalev
May	(Estonia) Sergei Ratnikov	Tallinna Kalev	(Estonia) Rasmus Tomson	Tallinna Kalev
June	(Estonia) Andrei Borissov	Infonet	(Estonia) Hannes Anier	Flora II
July	(Estonia) Sergei Ratnikov	Tallinna Kalev	(Estonia) Maksim Rõtškov	Infonet
August	(Estonia) Sergei Ratnikov	Tallinna Kalev	(Estonia) Ilja Antonov	Puuma
September	(Estonia) Argo Arbeiter (Estonia) Mati Pari	Levadia II	(Estonia) Igor Koroljov	Tallinna Kalev
October	(Estonia) Erik Šteinberg	Kiviõli Tamme Auto	(Estonia) Rimo Hunt	Tallinna Kalev

=== Esiliiga Player of the Year ===
Rimo Hunt was named Esiliiga Player of the Year.

== See also ==
- 2011 Meistriliiga
- 2010–11 Estonian Cup
