= FCI Levadia U19 Tallinn =

Estonian football club

Tallinna FC Levadia III
- Full name: Tallinna Football Club Levadia III
- Founded: 2003
- Ground: Maarjamäe kunstmuruväljak
- Manager: Aivar Priidel
- League: Esiliiga B
- 2026: Esiliiga B, 2nd of 10
- Website: http://fclevadia.ee/
Home colours	Away colours

Levadia III is a football club in Tallinn. It's the reserve team of FC Levadia U21. Currently it plays in II Liiga N/E.

In 2003 named Tallinna FC Levadia II, in 2004-2007 Maardu FC Levadia-Juunior.

== Players ==
=== First-team squad ===
As of 29 October 2017.

Note: Flags indicate national team as defined under FIFA eligibility rules; some limited exceptions apply. Players may hold more than one non-FIFA nationality.

No.	Pos.	Nation	Player
1	GK	EST	Siim Kristjan Salmi
4	MF	EST	Sergei Kostin
5	MF	EST	Daniil Petrunin
10	FW	EST	Enrice Lumiste
12	GK	EST	Fred Jörgen Luik
23	MF	EST	Ragnar Metsala
25	MF	EST	Karevi Pajumets
30	DF	EST	Markus Mäekivi
86	MF	EST	Maksim Novikov
—	DF	EST	Oskar Aksiim
—	MF	EST	Andrei Antonov
—	MF	EST	Silvestr Belozjorov
—	MF	EST	Jevgeni Ginzburg

No.	Pos.	Nation	Player
—	GK	EST	Anton Jefimov
—	DF	EST	Ilja Karunas
—	DF	EST	Anton Lahmanov
—	DF	EST	Fred Ojassoo
—	MF	EST	Aivar Priidel
—	FW	EST	Kert Pärkna
—	DF	EST	Jegor Rudomin
—	MF	EST	Robert Sadovski
—	DF	EST	Anton Savitski
—	MF	EST	Andrei Savotškin
—	DF	EST	Suren Stepanjan
—	FW	EST	Erik Utgof
—	FW	LTU	Andrej Voilenko

== Statistics ==
=== League and Cup ===
Season	Division	Pos	Pld	W	D	L	GF	GA	GD	Pts	Top goalscorer	Cup	Notes
2003	II Liiga N/E	3	28	16	5	7	79	50	+29	53	Jevgeni Gurtšioglujants (19)		as Maardu FC Levadia-Juunior
2004	II Liiga N/E	6	28	11	3	14	84	90	-6	36	Sergei Dmitrijev (20)		as Maardu FC Levadia-Juunior
2005	II Liiga N/E	3	28	15	2	11	64	53	+11	47	Sergei Dmitrijev (15)		as Maardu FC Levadia-Juunior
2006	II Liiga N/E	4	28	12	6	10	52	53	-1	42	Ilja Monakov (19)		as Maardu FC Levadia-Juunior
2007	III Liiga E	12	22	2	4	16	35	94	-59	10	Jaanis Einstein (9)		as Maardu FC Levadia-Juunior
2008–2010	Did not participate												
2011	IV Liiga E	3	22	14	3	5	66	24	+42	45	Oskar Friedrich Oengo and Mati Oolo (11)	-	as Tallinna FC Levadia III
2012	IV Liiga E	1	22	16	4	2	83	27	+56	52	Rasmus Raidla (14)	First round	as Tallinna FC Levadia III
2013	III Liiga E	3	22	13	4	5	52	31	+21	43	Jevgeni Berdinskih (9)	-	as Tallinna FC Levadia III
2014	II Liiga N/E	10	26	9	4	13	63	51	+12	31	Mart Paul Preiman (10)	-	as Tallinna FC Levadia III
2015	II Liiga N/E	13	26	5	4	17	48	61	-13	19	Hendrik Vellama (8)	-	as Tallinna FC Levadia III
2016	II Liiga N/E	6	26	12	5	9	58	51	+7	41	Artur Bõstrov (13)	Third round	as Tallinna FC Levadia III
2017	II Liiga N/E	2	26	17	0	9	93	50	+43	51	Marek Šatov (33)	Third round	as Tallinna FC Levadia III
