= Marko Meerits =

Estonian footballer (born 1992)

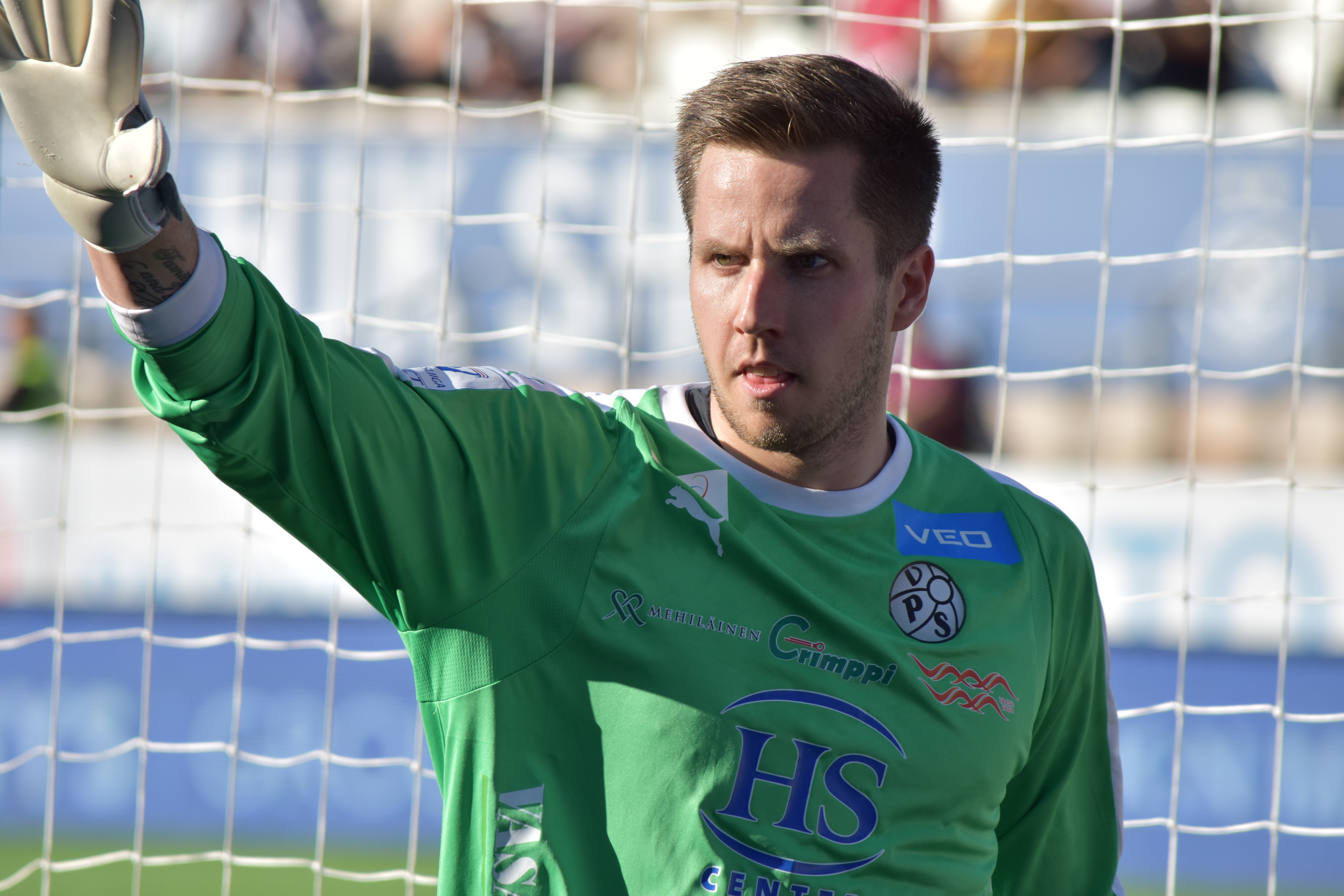
- Meerits with VPS in 2018

Personal information
- Full name: Marko Meerits
- Date of birth: 26 April 1992 (age 34)
- Place of birth: Viimsi, Estonia
- Height: 1.86 m (6 ft 1 in)
- Position: Goalkeeper

Team information
- Current team: Paide Linnameeskond
- Number: 12

Youth career
- 2003–2010: Flora

Senior career*
Years	Team	Apps	(Gls)
2009–2011	Flora II	44	(0)
2009–2011	Flora	23	(0)
2008	→ Warrior (loan)	3	(0)
2011–2014	Vitesse	4	(0)
2013	→ Flora (loan)	14	(0)
2014–2016	FC Emmen	36	(0)
2016	Tarvas	10	(0)
2017–2018	VPS	44	(0)
2019	Narva Trans	30	(0)
2020–2023	Nõmme Kalju	78	(0)
2023–2024	Nõmme United	40	(0)
2025–	Paide Linnameeskond	25	(0)

International career^{‡}
2008	Estonia U17	4	(0)
2009	Estonia U18	2	(0)
2009–2011	Estonia U19	22	(0)
2010–2014	Estonia U21	30	(0)
2013–2016	Estonia U23	3	(0)
2010–	Estonia	14	(0)
- * Club domestic league appearances and goals as of 17 November 2026 ‡ National team caps and goals as of 13 January 2023

Marko Meerits (born 26 April 1992) is an Estonian professional footballer who currently plays as a goalkeeper for Paide Linnameeskond and the Estonia national team.

== Club career ==
=== Flora ===
Meerits came through the Flora youth system. He moved to Esiliiga club Warrior on loan for the 2008 season. Meerits made his debut in the Meistriliiga on 15 May 2010, in a 2–1 win over Kuressaare. He made 10 appearances in the 2010 season as Flora won their eighth Meistriliiga title. In the Estonian Supercup on 1 March 2011, Meerits kept a clean sheet against Levadia for 120 minutes, eventually winning the match 5–3 in a penalty shootout by saving Konstantin Nahk's attempt and converting a penalty himself.

=== Vitesse ===
On 7 July 2011, Meerits signed a three-year contract with Dutch Eredivisie club Vitesse. He made his debut in the Eredivisie on 7 August 2011, when he came on as a 21st-minute substitute replacing the injured Eloy Room and kept a clean sheet in a 0–0 away draw against ADO Den Haag.

==== Flora (loan) ====
On 25 February 2013, Meerits returned to Flora on a five-month loan until the end of July.

=== FC Emmen ===
On 4 July 2014, Meerits signed a two-year contract with Dutch Eerste Divisie club FC Emmen. In his first season with FC Emmen, he conceded 51 goals in 36 Eerste Divisie matches. In the 2015–16 season, Meerits was sidelined by a knee injury.

=== Tarvas ===
On 30 August 2016, Meerits joined Meistriliiga club Tarvas until the end of the 2016 season.

=== VPS ===
On 27 January 2017, Meerits joined Finnish Veikkausliiga club VPS on a one-year deal with an option to extend the contract for another year. He made his debut in the Veikkausliiga on 5 April 2017, HJK.

=== Narva Trans ===
On 16 February 2019, Meerits signed a one-year contract with Meistriliiga club Narva Trans. On 25 May 2019, he captained the team in a 2–1 extra-time victory over Nõmme Kalju in the Estonian Cup final.

== International career ==
Meerits has represented Estonia at under-17, under-18, under-19, under-21 and under-23 levels.

On 14 December 2010, Meerits was named by manager Tarmo Rüütli in the Estonia squad to face China PR and Qatar in friendly matches. He made his senior debut for Estonia on 18 December 2010, replacing Pavel Londak in the 89th minute of a 0–3 away loss to China PR.

== Career statistics ==
=== Club ===
As of 1 January 2019.

Appearances and goals by club, season and competition
Club	Season	League			Cup (Note: Includes the Estonian Cup, KNVB Cup, and Finnish Cup)		Europe		Other		Total	
Club	Season	Division	Apps	Goals	Apps	Goals	Apps	Goals	Apps	Goals	Apps	Goals
Warrior (loan)	2008	Esiliiga	3	0	0	0	—		—		3	0
Flora II	2009	Esiliiga	29	0	3	0	—		—		32	0
Flora II	2010	Esiliiga	14	0	0	0	—		—		14	0
Flora II	2011	Esiliiga	1	0	0	0	—		—		1	0
Flora II	Total		44	0	3	0	—		—		47	0
Flora	2009	Meistriliiga	0	0	0	0	0	0	0	0	0	0
Flora	2010	Meistriliiga	10	0	3	0	1 (Note: Appearance(s) in UEFA Europa League)	0	1 (Note: Appearance in Baltic League)	0	15	0
Flora	2011	Meistriliiga	13	0	2	0	0	0	2 (Note: One appearances in Baltic Champions Cup, one appearance in Estonian Supercup)	0	17	0
Flora	Total		23	0	5	0	1	0	3	0	32	0
Vitesse	2011–12	Eredivisie	4	0	0	0	—		0	0	4	0
Vitesse	2012–13	Eredivisie	0	0	0	0	0	0	—		0	0
Vitesse	2013–14	Eredivisie	0	0	0	0	0	0	0	0	0	0
Vitesse	Total		4	0	0	0	0	0	0	0	4	0
Flora (loan)	2013	Meistriliiga	14	0	3	0	2	0	—		19	0
FC Emmen	2014–15	Eerste Divisie	36	0	2	0	—		2 (Note: Appearances in Eerste Divisie promotion play-offs)	0	40	0
FC Emmen	2015–16	Eerste Divisie	0	0	0	0	—		0	0	0	0
FC Emmen	Total		36	0	2	0	—		2	0	40	0
Tarvas	2016	Meistriliiga	10	0	1	1	—		—		11	1
VPS	2017	Veikkausliiga	31	0	5	0	4	0	—		40	0
VPS	2018	Veikkausliiga	13	0	6	0	—		—		19	0
VPS	Total		44	0	11	0	4	0	—		59	0
Career total			178	0	25	1	7	0	5	0	215	1

=== International ===
As of 13 January 2023.

Appearances and goals by national team and year
National team	Year	Apps	Goals
Estonia
Estonia	2010	1	0
Estonia	2011	1	0
Estonia	2014	1	0
Estonia	2016	2	0
Estonia	2017	4	0
Estonia	2018	2	0
Estonia	2019	1	0
Estonia	2020	1	0
Estonia	2023	1	0
Total		14	0

== Honours ==
=== Club ===
Flora

- Meistriliiga: 2010
- Estonian Cup: 2010–11, 2012–13
- Estonian Supercup: 2011

Narva Trans

- Estonian Cup: 2018–19

=== Individual ===
- Estonian Young Footballer of the Year: 2011, 2013
