= Artjom Artjunin =

Estonian footballer (born 1990)

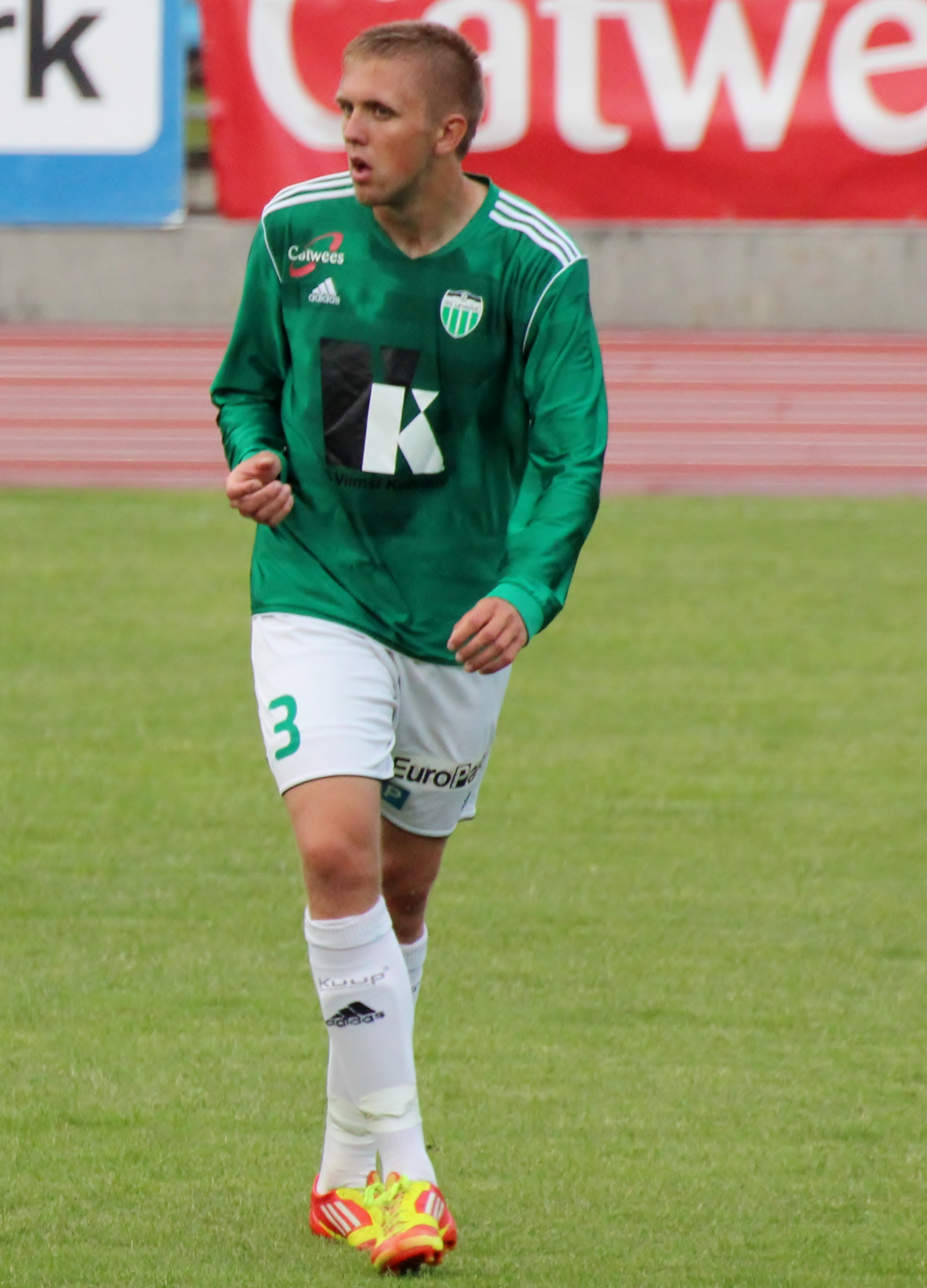
- Artjunin with Levadia in 2012

Personal information
- Date of birth: 24 January 1990 (age 36)
- Place of birth: Tallinn, then part of Estonian SSR, Soviet Union
- Height: 1.90 m (6 ft 3 in)
- Position: Centre-back

Senior career*
Years	Team	Apps	(Gls)
2006–2015	Levadia	121	(6)
2006	→ Levadia-Juunior	17	(0)
2007	→ Maardu (loan)	10	(1)
2007–2015	→ Levadia II	92	(12)
2009	→ Tammeka (loan)	13	(1)
2009	→ Tammeka II (loan)	1	(0)
2015	Brașov	3	(0)
2015	Levadia	13	(0)
2015	→ Levadia II	2	(0)
2016	Miedź Legnica	4	(1)
2016	→ Miedź Legnica II	2	(0)
2016–2017	Levadia	32	(1)
2018	Tallinna Kalev	16	(1)
2018–2019	Etar Veliko Tarnovo	33	(0)
2020–2022	Legion Tallinn	46	(3)
2022	Levadia II	27	(2)
2023	FC Tallinn	8	(3)

International career
2008–2009	Estonia U19	21	(3)
2008–2012	Estonia U21	19	(1)
2012–2013	Estonia U23	3	(0)
2013–2014	Estonia	6	(0)
- * Club domestic league appearances and goals as of 22 November 2023

Artjom Artjunin (born 24 January 1990) is an Estonian retired professional footballer who played as a centre-back.

== Career ==
On 18 June 2018, Artjunin signed a 2-year contract with Bulgarian club Etar.

In March 2022, Artjunin became the assistant coach of FCI Levadia U21 and the head coach of Levadia's U14 team.

== International career ==
Artjunin made his international debut for Estonia on 15 November 2013 against Azerbaijan.

== Honours ==
Levadia

- Meistriliiga: 2013, 2014
- Estonian Cup: 2009–10, 2011–12, 2013–14
- Estonian Supercup: 2010, 2013
