= Tartu Kalev =

Tartu Kalev may refer to

- Tartu Kalev-Välk, Estonian ice hockey club, located in Tartu
- FA Tartu Kalev, Estonian football club
- Tartu Kalev (basketball club), Estonian basketball club

== See also ==
- Tartu, a city in Estonia
