= Rakvere Tarvas =

Rakvere Tarvas are sport clubs based in Rakvere, Estonia. The name may refer to:

- BC Rakvere Tarvas, Estonian basketball club
- Rakvere JK Tarvas, Estonian football club
