= 2010 Esiliiga =

Estonian football league season for second division

Esiliiga
- Season: 2010
- Matches played: 60
- Goals scored: 189 (3.15 per match)
- Biggest home win: TJK Legion 8–0 Rakvere
- Biggest away win: Rakvere 1–6 Flora U21
- Highest scoring: TJK Legion 8–0 Rakvere; Flora U21 6–2 Rakvere

The 2010 season of the Esiliiga, the second level in the Estonian football system, is the 20th season in the league's history. It starts in March and ends in November. The defending champions are Levadia II, who are unable for promotion as they are the reserve team for Meistriliiga side Levadia.

== Overview ==
Location of the 2010 Esiliiga teams

Club	Location	Stadium	Current manager
Flora II	Tallinn	Sportland Arena	(Estonia) Zaur Tšilingarašvili
Flora Rakvere	Rakvere	Rakvere linnastaadion	(Estonia) Urmas Kirs
Ajax	Tallinn	FC Ajax Stadium	(Estonia) Aleksandr Puštov
Levadia II	Tallinn	Maarjamäe kunstmuru	(Estonia) Urmas Hepner
Tallinna Kalev	Tallinn	Kalev Keskstaadion artificial turf	(Estonia) Sergei Ratnikov
Orbiit	Jõhvi	Jõhvi linnastaadion	(Estonia) Valeri Kulatšenko
Kiviõli Tamme Auto	Kiviõli	Kiviõli Stadium	(Estonia) Erik Šteinberg
TJK Legion	Tallinn	Wismar Stadium	(Estonia) Viktor Passikuta
Warrior	Valga	Sportland Arena	(Estonia) Zaur Tšilingarašvili
Vaprus	Pärnu	Pärnu Kalev Stadium	(Estonia) Ants Kommussaar

== League table ==
Pos	Team	Pld	W	D	L	GF	GA	GD	Pts	Promotion or relegation
1	Levadia II (Note: Reserve teams are ineligible for promotion.) (C)	36	28	5	3	107	28	+79	89	
2	Flora U21	36	22	6	8	93	45	+48	72	
3	Lasnamäe Ajax (P)	36	20	9	7	71	38	+33	69	Promotion to Meistriliiga
4	Tamme Auto	36	17	6	13	85	72	+13	57	Qualification for promotion play-offs
5	Tallinna Kalev (Note: Before the start of the season Flora Rakvere were docked two points and Tallinna Kalev were docked five points, both because of licensing problems. After the appeal, Kalev's deduction was reduced to four points.)	36	17	6	13	67	65	+2	53	
6	TJK Legion	36	11	6	19	57	81	−24	39	
7	Vaprus	36	10	7	19	57	78	−21	37	
8	Warrior	36	10	6	20	57	90	−33	36	Qualification for relegation play-offs
9	Rakvere (R)	36	10	3	23	45	95	−50	31	Relegation to II Liiga
10	Orbiit (R)	36	6	4	26	35	82	−47	22	Relegation to II Liiga

Source: jalgpall.ee (in Estonian)
Rules for classification: 1st points; 2nd least withdrawals or annulled matches; 3rd wins; 4th head-to-head points; 5th head-to-head goal difference; 6th overall goal difference; 7th goals scored
(C) Champions; (P) Promoted; (R) Relegated

== Results ==
Each team plays every opponent four times, twice at home and twice on the road, for a total of 36 games.

=== First half of season ===
Home \ Away	FLO	RAK	AJX	LEV	TK	ORB	TMA	TJK	WAR	VPR
Flora U21		6–2	0–0	1–0	2–1	6–2	2–0	1–1	0–0	0–0
Rakvere	1–6		0–0	0–4	2–1	0–2	2–0 (Note: The match was declared 2–x for Rakvere because Tamme Auto used ineligible player. The original result was 2–1.)	3–4	0–0	1–4
Lasnamäe Ajax	2–1	3–2		2–2	2–1	3–0	3–2	1–0	6–0	1–0
Levadia II	0–1	6–0	2–0		3–0	1–1	3–0	4–0	4–0	2–0
Tallinna Kalev	2–3	1–0	1–1	0–2		1–0	4–3	3–0	4–1	4–0
Orbiit	2–1	1–2	0–3	0–1	1–2		0–3	0–1	0–2	0–0
Tamme Auto	2–2	3–0	3–3	1–4	1–3	3–1		3–1	3–2	4–3
TJK Legion	1–3	8–0	1–2	1–4	0–2	1–0	0–2		3–0	1–2
Warrior	0–2	4–0	0–3	2–1	0–3	1–2	0–4	2–2		0–3
Vaprus	3–1	3–1	0–0	0–1	2–2	5–0	2–2	2–3	1–1	

Source: Estonian Football Association (in Estonian)
Legend: Blue = home team win; Yellow = draw; Red = away team win.

=== Second half of season ===
Home \ Away	FLO	RAK	AJX	LEV	TK	ORB	TMA	TJK	WAR	VPR
Flora U21		1–2	0–3	1–0	7–0	5–0	3–7	8–0	3–1	5–1
Rakvere	1–2		1–3	2–3	2–3	2–1	0–0	3–2	1–3	1–2
Lasnamäe Ajax	0–2	3–0		0–1	1–3	5–0	3–2	3–1	1–3	1–2
Levadia II	1–1	3–2	4–2		0–0	2–1	6–0	8–2	5–2	6–0
Tallinna Kalev	2–3	3–1	1–1	1–6		2–2	0–2	0–1	3–5	4–3
Orbiit	0–6	1–2	1–2	0–4	0–1		1–2	4–0	4–1	1–2
Tamme Auto	2–5	1–1	1–1	1–4	1–3	6–3		4–1	4–0	4–0
TJK Legion	3–2	4–1	0–0	2–2	1–1	1–2	2–3		0–3	5–1
Warrior	4–1	2–4	1–3	3–5	3–4	2–2	4–3	0–2		2–2
Vaprus	0–3	2–3	0–4	2–3	0–1	4–1	2–3	2–2	2–3	

Source: Estonian Football Association (in Estonian)
Legend: Blue = home team win; Yellow = draw; Red = away team win.

== Top scorers ==
Rank	Player	Club	Goals
1	(Estonia) Tõnis Starkopf	Kiviõli Tamme Auto	28
2	(Estonia) Sergei Tasso	Lasnamäe Ajax	24
3	(Estonia) Artur Rättel	Levadia II	18
4	(Estonia) Jaan Leimann	Flora II	15
5	(Estonia) Dmitri Kirilov	Kiviõli Tamme Auto	14
5	(Estonia) Maksim Kisseljov	TJK Legion	14
7	(Estonia) Hannes Anier	Flora II	13
7	(Estonia) Taavi Laurits	Vaprus	13
7	(Estonia) Marten Mütt	Flora II	13
10	(Estonia) Sergei Akimov	Rakvere Flora	12
10	(Russia) Yaroslav Dmitriev	Levadia II	12
10	(Estonia) Raiko Karpov	Warrior	12
10	(Estonia) Ilja Monakov	Tallinna Kalev	12

== Awards ==
=== Monthly awards ===
Month	Manager of the Month		Player of the Month	
Month	Manager	Club	Player	Club
March	(Estonia) Sergei Ratnikov	Tallinna Kalev	(Estonia) Sergei Tasso	Ajax
April	(Estonia) Andrei Borissov	Ajax	(Estonia) Artjom Dmitrijev	Levadia II
May	(Russia) Aleksandr Pushtov	Levadia II	(Estonia) Andrei Borissov	Ajax
June	(Russia) Aleksandr Pushtov	Levadia II	(Estonia) Andrei Veis	Flora II
July	(Estonia) Zaur Tšilingarašvili	Flora II	(Estonia) Tõnis Starkopf	Kiviõli Tamme Auto
August	(Estonia) Vitali Bolšakov	Orbiit	(Estonia) Aleksandr Marašov	Orbiit

== See also ==
- 2010 Meistriliiga
- 2009–10 Estonian Cup
