= 2013–14 Estonian Cup =

Estonian football competition

Tournament details
- Country: Estonia
- Teams: 111

Final positions
- Champions: Levadia (8th title)
- Runners-up: Santos

Tournament statistics
- Matches played: 104
- Goals scored: 561 (5.39 per match)

The 2013–14 Estonian Cup was the 24th season of the Estonia's most prestigious football knockout tournament. Levadia won the competition after they defeated Santos 4–0 in the final. As Levadia had already qualified for UEFA Champions League as reigning Estonian Champion Santos qualified for the first qualifying round of the 2014–15 UEFA Europa League as the cup runners-up.

== First round ==
The draw was made by Estonian Football Association on 18 May 2013, before the 2012–13 final of the same competition. League level of the club in the brackets. Rahvaliiga (RL) is a league organized by Estonian Football Association, but not part of the main league system.

Home team	Score	Away team
28 May
FC Elva (3)	1–0	(5) Tallinna JK Kalev III
3 June
Nõmme JK Kalju (1)	14–0	(6) Pühajärve JK Revali
4 June
FC Olympic (5)	0–4	(2) Viljandi JK Tulevik
JK Suema Cargobus (6)	0–9	(1) Tallinna FC Infonet
5 June
Tallinna FC Twister (6)	0–5	(1) Paide Linnameeskond
JK Retro (5)	1–11	(1) Narva JK Trans
SJK Leisi (5)	2–5	(5) Põlva FC Lootos
Tartu FC Santos (4)	3–1	(2) JK Vändra Vaprus
Tallinna Maccabi (5)	2–4	(4) Tartu SK 10 II
EMÜ SK (5)	0–1	(4) FC Nõmme United
HÜJK Emmaste (3)	4–0	(4) JK Kaitseliit Kalev
Nõmme Kalju II (3)	0–1	(4) Raasiku FC Joker 1993
SK Noorus 96 Jõgeva (4)	1–2	(4) FCF Tallinna Ülikool
Pärnu Linnameeskond (3)	3–1 (a.e.t.)	(6) Nõmme JK Kalju III
Jõhvi FC Lokomotiv (2)	w/o^{1}	(6) JK Pärnu-Jaagupi
6 June
Tallinna FC Reaal (6)	0–18	(1) Tallinna FC Flora
Tõrva JK (5)	1–6	(2) Tartu SK 10
SK Tapa (6)	1–4	(6) SK Imavere Forss
JK Loo (4)	3–5	(5) Ambla Vallameeskond
Tartu Tehased (RL)	3–2	(5) Eestimaa Kasakad
FC Soccernet (6)	0–4	(2) JK Tammeka II Tartu
Tartu FC Merkuur (6)	w/o^{2}	(6) Pirita Reliikvia
8 June
Tallinna JK Legion (3)	w/o^{3}	(RL) JK Kose
9 June
JK Roosad Pantrid (RL)	1–8	(RL) JK Nirvaana
FC Kiiu (6)	0–1	(6) Viimsi FC Igiliikur
Kernu JK Kadakas (5)	0–3	(1) FC Kuressaare
Tallinna FC Dnipro (6)	0–11	(1) JK Sillamäe Kalev
JK Eesti Väitlusselts (RL)	0–4	(RL) JK Õismäe Torm
JK Raudteetöölised (RL)	2–2 (a.e.t.) (1–4 p)	(RL) FC Shnelli
11 June
JK Tallinna Kalev Juunior (6)	0–2	(4) Rummu Dünamo
12 June
Kohtla-Järve JK Järve (3)	3–1	(5) Kuusalu JK Rada
Tallinna FC Levadia (1)	11–0	(5) Võru JK
Lihula JK (5)	7–1	(5) FC Lelle
FC Otepää (5)	2–1	(3) Tallinna JK Dünamo
Rapla JK Atli (5)	6–0	(RL) FC Donkers
Valga FC Warrior (5)	1–3	(5) JK Piraaja Tallinn
13 June
Tartu Ülikool Fauna (6)	w/o^{4}	(6) Taebla JK
16 June
Rakvere Wiswald (RL)	0–7	(4) FC Infonet II
Trummi SK (5)	7–4	(RL) FC Helios
18 June
FC Maardu Starbunker (4)	3–1	(4) Pärnu FC Metropool
19 June
JK Kaitseliit Kalev II (5)	1–5	(5) Navi Vutiselts
FC Eston Villa (5)	0–0(a.e.t.) (4–2 p)	(4) JK Ganvix Türi
20 June
Saue JK Laagri (4)	9–0	(6) Tartu Harrastajad
FC Pokkeriprod (6)	1–6	(3) FC Ararat TTÜ SK
26 June
Kiviõli FC Irbis (2)	4–1(a.e.t.)	(5) FC Kose
Lasnamäe FC Ajax (4)	5–0	(6) Saku Sporting
2 July
JK Tallinna Kalev (1)	5–3	(2) Rakvere JK Tarvas

Notes

- Note 1: JK Pärnu-Jaagupi withdrew from the competition.
- Note 2: Pirita Reliikvia withdrew from the competition.
- Note 3: JK Kose withdrew from the competition.
- Note 4: Taebla JK withdrew from the competition.

=== Byes ===
These teams were not drawn and secured a place in the second round without playing:

- Meistriliiga (Level 1): Tartu JK Tammeka
- Esiliiga (2): Tallinna FC Puuma, Tallinna FC Flora II
- Esiliiga B (3): –
- II Liiga (4): Tartu JK Welco Elekter,
- III Liiga (5): FCF Järva-Jaani SK, FC Balteco, SK Tääksi, Saaremaa JK aameraaS, Viimsi MRJK
- IV Liiga (6): IAFA Estonia, FC Haiba, FC Toompea
- Rahvaliiga: FC Smuuli, Kohtla-Nõmme, FC Tartu, JK Väätsa Vald, JK Jalgpallihaigla

== Second round ==
The draw for the second round was made on 14 June.

Home team	Score	Away team
1 July
Viimsi MRJK (5)	0–5	(3) Kohtla-Järve JK Järve
2 July
FCF Järva-Jaani (5)	2–0	(6) Tartu FC Merkuur
3 July
Tartu SK 10 II (4)	w/o^{1}	(6) FC Toompea
4 July
FC Tartu (RL)	4–0	(6) Viimsi FC Igiliikur
Saue JK Laagri (4)	2–1	(6) IAFA Estonia
5 July
Tallinna JK Piraaja (5)	6–0	(RL) JK Õismäe Torm
9 July
Nõmme JK Kalju (1)	14–0	(RL) Kohtla-Nõmme
Jõhvi FC Lokomotiv (2)	13–0	(RL) FC Shnelli
Viljandi JK Tulevik (2)	1–0	(6) SK Imavere Forss
FC Elva (3)	1–1 (a.e.t.) (4–5 p)	(2) JK Tammeka II Tartu
Tartu SK 10 (2)	7–0	(5) Navi Vutiselts
Lasnamäe FC Ajax (4)	1–5	(2) Tallinna FC Puuma
10 July
Saaremaa JK aameraaS (5)	5–1	(RL) FC Smuuli
FC Infonet II (4)	8–1	(5) Ambla Vallameeskond
Tartu Ülikool Fauna (6)	0–3	(5) FC Otepää
FC Eston Villa (5)	0–8	(3) Tallinna JK Legion
15 July
HÜJK Emmaste (3)	1–0	(4) FCF Tallinna Ülikool
16 July
Tartu FC Santos (4)	8–0	(RL) Tartu Tehased
Tallinna FC Balteco (5)	1–7	(3) Pärnu Linnameeskond
17 July
Raasiku FC Joker 1993 (4)	9–0	(5) Rapla JK Atli
FC Nõmme United (4)	7–1	(6) FC Haiba
18 July
Kiviõli FC Irbis (2)	7–1	(5) Põlva FC Lootos
20 July
JK Jalgpallihaigla (RL)	1–2	(RL) JK Väätsa Vald
22 July
Tallinna FC Levadia (1)	8–0	(5) Lihula JK
23 July
FC Kuressaare (1)	6–1	(RL) JK Nirvaana
JK Sillamäe Kalev (1)	0–1	(1) Tallinna FC Flora
24 July
Tartu JK Welco Elekter (4)	5–2	(5) SK Tääksi
Trummi SK (5)	1–2	(3) FC Ararat TTÜ SK
30 July
Tallinna FC Flora II (2)	2–4	(1) Narva JK Trans
JK Tallinna Kalev (1)	1–2	(1) Tallinna FC Infonet
6 August
Paide Linnameeskond (1)	5–2	(4) Rummu Dünamo
13 August
Maardu FC Starbunker (4)	1–5	(1) Tartu JK Tammeka

Notes

- Note 1: FC Toompea withdrew from the competition.

== Third round ==
The draw for the third round was made on 18 July.

Home team	Score	Away team
6 August
Viljandi JK Tulevik (2)	1–2	(1) Tallinna FC Flora
Tallinna JK Piraaja (5)	0–1	(1) FC Kuressaare
7 August
Pärnu Linnameeskond (3)	4–1	(5) FC Otepää
Narva JK Trans (1)	0–0 (a.e.t.) (3–5p)	(4) Tartu FC Santos
Tartu SK 10 (2)	2–1	(3) Tallinna JK Legion
Tartu JK Welco Elekter (4)	2–1	(3) Tallinna FC Ararat TTÜ
8 August
FC Nõmme United (4)	2–6	(2) Jõhvi FC Lokomotiv
13 August
JK Tammeka II Tartu (2)	2–1	(4) FC Infonet II
15 August
Tallinna FC Puuma (2)	8–1	(5) FCF Järva-Jaani SK
Saue JK Laagri (4)	4–0	(RL) JK Väätsa Vald
20 August
Saaremaa JK aameraaS (5)	1–2	(RL) FC Tartu
28 August
Tartu JK Tammeka (1)	1–3	(3) HÜJK Emmaste
4 September
Paide Linnameeskond (1)	6–1	(4) Tartu SK 10 II
Raasiku FC Joker 1993 (4)	1–5	(2) Kiviõli FC Irbis
11 September
Tallinna FC Infonet (1)	6–0	(3) Kohtla-Järve JK Järve
22 October
Nõmme JK Kalju (1)	1–3	(1) Tallinna FC Levadia

== Fourth round ==
The draw for the fourth round was made on 15 August.

Home team	Score	Away team
4 September
Jõhvi FC Lokomotiv (2)	0–0 (a.e.t.) (5–4p)	(3) Pärnu Linnameeskond
11 September
Tartu JK Welco Elekter (4)	3–4	(2) Tallinna FC Puuma
Kiviõli FC Irbis (2)	0–11	(4) Tartu FC Santos
25 September
HÜJK Emmaste (3)	1–0	(2) Tartu SK 10
5 October
FC Kuressaare (1)	1–0	(1) Paide Linnameeskond
16 October
JK Tammeka II Tartu (2)	6–0	(4) Saue JK Laagri
FC Tartu (RL)	1–6	(1) Tallinna FC Infonet
12 November
Tallinna FC Levadia (1)	2–0	(1) Tallinna FC Flora

== Quarter-finals ==
The draw was made on 28 February 2014. Levadia got bye to the semi-finals as the eighth quarter-finalist, Tammeka II, was disbanded after the 2013 league season.

15 April 2014	Kuressaare (2)	1–3	(3) Santos	Salme Parish
18:00 UTC+3	Laht 87'	Report	9' Alve; 63' Vereshchak; 75' Laas	Stadium: Salme Stadium; Attendance: 160; Referee: Andrei Karhu

15 April 2014	Infonet (1)	2–0	(2) Puuma	Tallinn
19:00 UTC+3	Manucho 44'; Mõttus 80' (o.g.)	Report		Stadium: Sportland Arena; Attendance: 121; Referee: Tomi Rahula

16 April 2014	Lokomotiv (1)	0–1	(3) Emmaste	Jõhvi
18:00 UTC+3		Report	6' Tükk	Stadium: Jõhvi linnastaadion Attendance: 85; Referee: Mart Martin

Levadia (1)	bye

== Semi-finals ==
The draw was made on 17 April 2014.

29 April 2014	Infonet (1)	0–1 (a.e.t.)	(1) Levadia	Tallinn
19:00 UTC+3		Report	Teever 105'	Stadium: Sportland Arena; Referee: Eiko Saar

1 May 2014	Emmaste (3)	1–3	(3) Santos	Tallinn
19:00 UTC+3	Oja 83'	Report	Laas 10'; Teniste 81' (pen.), 90+3'	Stadium: Sportland Arena; Referee: Kristo Külljastinen

== Final ==
The final was scheduled to be played on 17 May 2014.

17 May 2014	Levadia (1)	4–0	(3) Santos	Tallinn
16:00 UTC+3	Ivanov 10', 87'; Teever 29'; Tamm 80'	Report		Stadium: A. Le Coq Arena; Attendance: 1,737; Referee: Martin Salong

== See also ==
- 2013 Meistriliiga
- 2013 Esiliiga
- 2014 Meistriliiga
- 2014 Esiliiga
