= 2001–02 Estonian Cup =

Eesti Karikas

Tournament details
- Country: Estonia
- Teams: 19

Final positions
- Champions: Levadia Tallinn
- Runners-up: Levadia Maardu

Tournament statistics
- Matches played: 23
- Goals scored: 106 (4.61 per match)

The 2001–02 Estonian Cup (Estonian: Eesti Karikas) was the 12th season of the Estonian football knockout tournament. Winners of the cup qualified for the 2002–03 UEFA Cup qualifying round. The defending champion, Narva Trans, was knocked out in the semi-final against later cup winners Levadia Tallinn.

The competition culminated with the final held at Lilleküla Stadium, Tallinn on 31 May 2002 with Levadia Tallinn taking the title 2–0.

All in all, 19 teams took part of the competition.

== First round ==
Team 1	Score	Team 2
2 September
Lelle	0–9	Levadia Pärnu
Muhumaa	2–6	Sillamäe Kalev
Hansa United	2–3	HÜJK

== Second round ==
Team 1	Score	Team 2
7 October
Tervis Pärnu	0–7	Tulevik
Sillamäe Kalev	2–3	Levadia Tallinn
HÜJK	1–5 (a.e.t.)	Narva Trans
Levadia Pärnu	0–2	Levadia Maardu
9 October
Elva	1–2 (a.e.t.)	Lootus
Valga	1–3 (a.e.t.)	TVMK
Merkuur	7–4 (a.e.t.)	Kuressaare
S.C. Real	w/o	Flora

== Quarter-finals ==
The first legs were played on 9 April 2002, and the second legs on 22 April 2002.

Team 1	Agg.	Team 2	1st leg	2nd leg
Merkuur	4–10	Narva Trans	2–3	2–7
Lootus	3–7	TVMK	1–4	2–3
Levadia Maardu	3–0	Tulevik	2–0	1–0
Flora	3–3 (a)	Levadia Tallinn	2–2	1–1

== Semi-finals ==
The first legs were played on 5 May 2002, and the second legs on 21 May 2002.

Team 1	Agg.	Team 2	1st leg	2nd leg
Narva Trans	2–3	Levadia Tallinn	1–1	1–2
Levadia Maardu	3–3 (a)	TVMK	1–1	2–2

== Final ==
31 May 2002	Levadia Tallinn	2–0	Levadia Maardu	Tallinn
	Jagudin 43', 84'			Stadium: A. Le Coq Arena; Attendance: 200; Referee: Sten Kaldma
