= Vladimir Aga =

Moldovan soccer player and coach

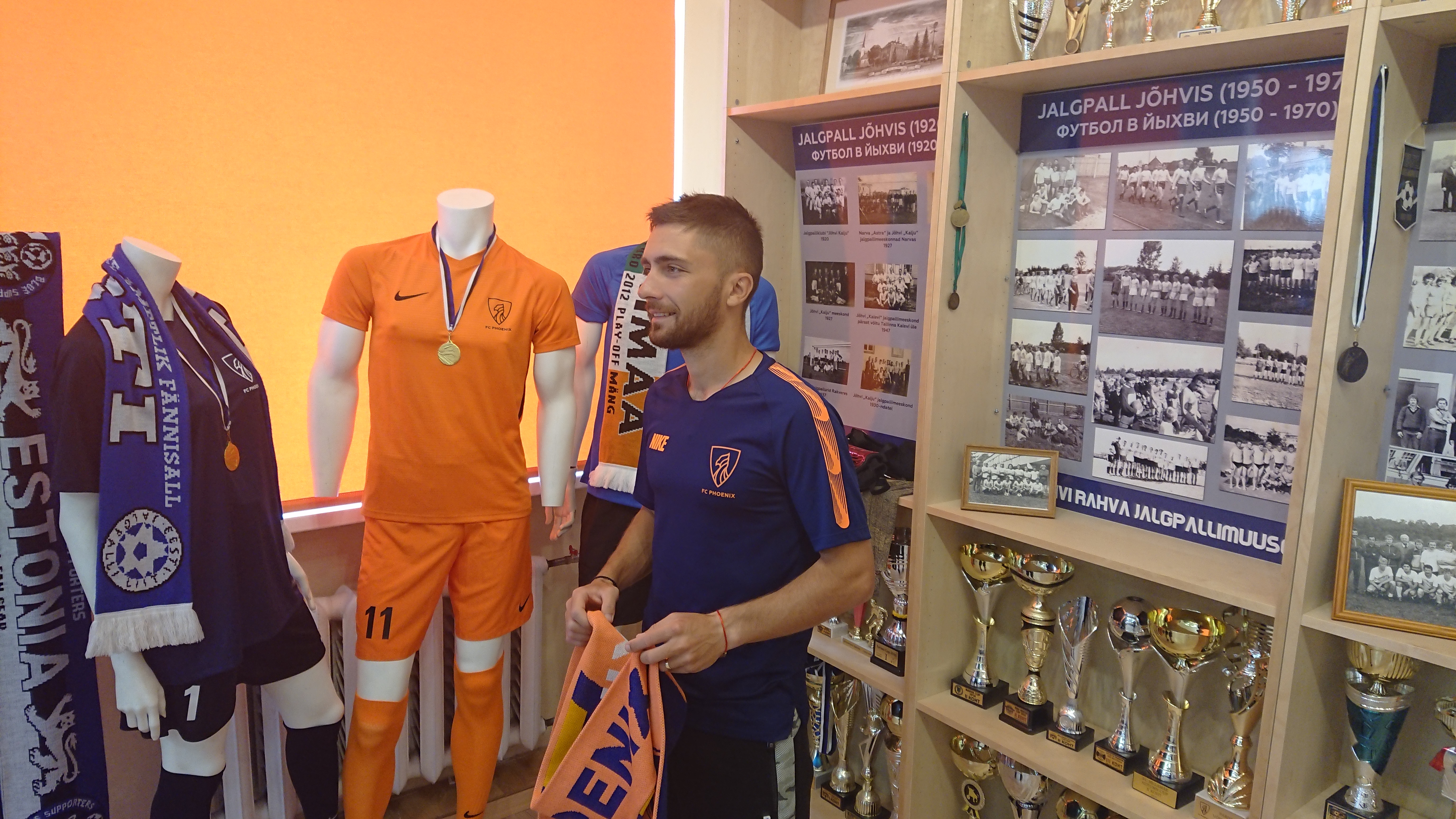
- Aga in 2020

Personal information
- Full name: Vladimir Aga
- Date of birth: 14 November 1987 (age 38)
- Place of birth: Chișinău, Moldavian SSR, Soviet Union
- Position: Midfielder

Team information
- Current team: Jõhvi FC Phoenix

Vladimir Aga (born 9 November 1987) is a former Moldovan footballer who played as midfielder, and who currently is football manager at the Estonian club Jõhvi FC Phoenix.

== Career ==
=== Player ===
Aga began to play football at 12 years, and his first coach was Sergiu Balan.

In 2007 and 2008 he played for Moldova's under 21 futsal team.

He debuted in Moldovan Super League playing for FC Costuleni, on 20 February 2011 in a match against FC Milsami.

On 29 October 2021 Aga became a playing manager of Estonian futsal team Jõhvi FC Phoenix, which on that day has debuted in Estonian first futsal league.

=== Manager ===
From 2015 until 2016 Aga was part of main and under-19 coach staffs of Moldova women football teams.

In February 2018, Aga together with Marius Codescu headed up the Moldovan Super League club Zimbru Chișinău, but in June has resigned from the post. Under Aga, on 23 May 2018, in the final of Moldovan Cup Zimbru has lost 0–2 to Milsami Orhei. From June until November 2019 Aga returned as head coach of FC Zimbru.

Aga holds an UEFA PRO manager license.

On 1 July 2020 Aga headed up the Estonian club Jõhvi FC Phoenix, where he concomitantly runs the under-16 team, and from autumn of 2021 - also the futsal team of feniks.

== Personal life ==
Aga is married and has two children.

== Honours ==
- Runner-up of Moldovan Cup (1): 2017/18
- Runner-up of Estonian Futsal Cup (3): 2022/23, 2023/24, 2024/25
