= Rakvere JK Tarvas =

Estonian football club

Rakvere Tarvas
- Full name: Rakvere Jalgpalliklubi Tarvas
- Founded: 2004; 22 years ago, as Virumaa JK Rakvere
- Ground: Rakvere linnastaadion
- Capacity: 1,785
- President: Aleksandr Holst
- Manager: Tarmo Rebane
- League: II liiga
- 2024: II liiga N/E, 3rd of 14
- Website: http://www.jktarvas.ee
Home colours	Away colours

Rakvere Jalgpalliklubi Tarvas, commonly known as Rakvere Tarvas, or simply as Tarvas, is an Estonian football club based in Rakvere that competes in II liiga, the fourth tier of Estonian football. The club's home ground is Rakvere linnastaadion.

The club was founded in 2004 as Virumaa JK Rakvere. From 2008 until 2010, the club was named Rakvere FC Flora, and since 2011 Rakvere JK Tarvas. The club has competed in the Estonian top division Meistriliiga once, in 2016.

== History ==
FC Flora Rakvere crest (2008–2010)

The club was founded in 2004 as Virumaa Jalgpalliklubi Rakvere (English: Virumaa Football Club Rakvere). From 2008, Rakvere became affiliated with Flora and became Rakvere FC Flora. In 2011, the team name was changed to Tarvas (English: Aurochs), which is the symbol of Rakvere and is derived from the historic name of the town, Tarvanpea (Aurochs' head). In 2012, Tarvas was promoted to Esiliiga and finished the 2012 season in third place. The club faced JK Tallinna Kalev in the promotion play-offs, but lost 1–3 on aggregate. Tarvas finished the 2013 Esiliiga season in 4th place but were beaten in the promotion play-offs by Tartu Tammeka 2–6 on aggregate. In July 2014, Valeri Bondarenko was hired as manager.

Rakvere Tarvas finished the 2015 Esiliiga season in 4th place and as the three higher placed teams were reserve teams and thus ineligible for promotion, Tarvas were promoted to the Meistriliiga for the first time in their history. In the process, they became the first club from Lääne-Viru County to play in the Estonian top division. Tarvas earned just 1 point in their first 14 Meistriliiga games and on 4 June 2016, Bondarenko was sacked and replaced as manager by Urmas Kirs. Tarvas earned another two draws and finished the season at the bottom of the table with three points. For the following three seasons, Rakvere Tarvas competed in Esiliiga, before being relegated to Esiliiga B for 2020 and eventually dropping down to the fourth tier in 2021.

== Players ==
=== Squads ===
As of 25 June 2025

Note: Flags indicate national team as defined under FIFA eligibility rules; some limited exceptions apply. Players may hold more than one non-FIFA nationality.

No.	Pos.	Nation	Player
1	GK	EST	Magnus Hain
6	MF	EST	Olger Tauer
7	DF	EST	Karel Liblekas
8	FW	EST	Roland Pakaste
10	FW	EST	Mattias Roop
11	MF	EST	Robin Klaus
14	FW	EST	Markus Aasemets
15	DF	EST	Siim Rannamäe
16	DF	EST	Henri Matias Eliste
17	DF	EST	Oliver Leppik
18	FW	EST	Kennert Liblik
19	MF	EST	Kristjan Kari

No.	Pos.	Nation	Player
20	MF	EST	Kristian Anthon
21	MF	EST	Sergo Saksen
22	MF	EST	Oskar Retsold
23	DF	EST	Aleksander Holland
27	MF	EST	Enriko Saare
28	MF	EST	Dmitrii Baikov
30	GK	EST	Rene Põldmaa
31	MF	EST	Robi Štŝjogolev
32	DF	EST	Keijo Õunapu
33	DF	EST	Esben Stern
35	GK	RUS	Artem Levizi
36	MF	EST	Jaan Matis Kangur
66	DW	EST	Kristo Remmelgas

On 10 March 2018

Note: Flags indicate national team as defined under FIFA eligibility rules; some limited exceptions apply. Players may hold more than one non-FIFA nationality.

No.	Pos.	Nation	Player
2	MF	EST	Alari Aunapuu
3	DF	EST	Rain Ööpik
4	DF	EST	Kaarel Saar (vice-captain)
6	DF	EST	Mehis Vahero
8	DF	EST	Taavi Münter
9	FW	EST	Sergei Akimov
10	MF	EST	German-Guri Lvov
11	MF	EST	Toomas Kiis
15	FW	EST	Siim Rannamäe
17	MF	EST	Alari Tovstik
18	DF	EST	Mihkel Saar
21	MF	EST	Mario Kuokkanen

No.	Pos.	Nation	Player
22	MF	EST	Joonas Ljaš
23	MF	EST	Madis Reimal
26	DF	EST	Elar Tovstik
27	MF	EST	Taavi Trasberg (captain)
28	MF	EST	Dmitrii Baikov
30	GK	EST	Sander Susi (vice-captain)
34	DF	EST	Chris Martin
35	GK	RUS	Artem Levizi
45	DF	EST	Aleksei Larin (on loan from Tallinna Kalev)
69	DF	EST	Mihkel Gull
91	FW	EST	Henri Hang

== Personnel ==
=== Technical staff ===
Position	Name
Manager	(Estonia) Tarmo Rebane
Assistant manager	(Estonia) Reijo Kuusik
Physiotherapist	(Estonia) Hannalore Taal
Medic	(Estonia) Piret Elm

=== Managerial history ===
Dates	Name
2004–2005	(Estonia) Jaak Proosa
2005–2007	(Estonia) Ain Mets
2008	(Estonia) Mati Pari
2008	(Estonia) Urmas Kirs
2009	(Estonia) Sergei Zamogilnõi
2010	(Estonia) Jan Važinski
2011–2014	(Estonia) Reijo Kuusik
2014–2016	(Estonia) Valeri Bondarenko
2016–2017	(Estonia) Urmas Kirs
2017–	(Estonia) Tarmo Rebane

== Internationals ==
Player	Caps while at club	Period at club	Caps overall
(Estonia) Marko Meerits	1	2016	5
(Estonia) Kristian Marmor	0	2013	1
(Estonia) Toomas Tohver	0	2008	24
(Estonia) Mati Pari	0	2008	22
(Estonia) Märten Kuusk	0	2016	32

== Statistics ==
=== League and Cup ===
Season	Division	Pos	Pld	W	D	L	GF	GA	GD	Pts	Top goalscorer	Cup	Notes
2004	V liiga	1	14	13	0	1	81	12	+69	39	(Estonia) Alar Petrovits (29)		as Rakvere JK
2005	III liiga	3	22	15	3	4	56	28	+28	48	(Estonia) Esko Brandt (Estonia) Reijo Kuusik (9)		as Virumaa JK Rakvere
2006	III liiga	2	22	15	2	5	57	34	+23	47	(Estonia) Alar Petrovits (25)		as Virumaa JK Rakvere
2007	II liiga	2	26	16	4	6	75	36	+39	52	(Estonia) Alar Petrovits (25)	Third round	as Virumaa JK Rakvere
2008	Esiliiga	8	36	10	7	19	53	82	−29	37	(Estonia) Alar Petrovits (17)	Second round	as Rakvere FC Flora
2009	Esiliiga	10	36	8	2	26	48	105	−57	20	(Estonia) Alar Petrovits (11)	Second round	as Rakvere FC Flora
2010	Esiliiga	9	36	10	3	23	45	95	−50	21	(Estonia) Alar Petrovits (11)	Second round	as Rakvere FC Flora
2011	II liiga	1	26	22	2	2	100	29	+71	68	(Estonia) Joonas Ljaš (27)	Third round	as Rakvere JK Tarvas
2012	Esiliiga	3	36	21	5	10	66	58	+8	68	(Estonia) Joonas Ljaš (14)	Fourth round	as Rakvere JK Tarvas
2013	Esiliiga	4	36	16	8	12	68	58	+10	56	(Estonia) Henri Hang (11)	Third round	as Rakvere JK Tarvas
2014	Esiliiga	8	36	12	10	14	61	65	−4	46	(Estonia) Sergei Akimov (21)	First round	as Rakvere JK Tarvas
2015	Esiliiga	4	36	12	11	13	52	53	−1	47	(Estonia) Sergei Akimov (16)	Third round	as Rakvere JK Tarvas
2016	Meistriliiga	10	36	0	3	33	15	113	−98	3	(Estonia) Märten Kuusk (Estonia) Siim Rannamäe (Estonia) Juhan Jograf Siim (2)	Third round	as Rakvere JK Tarvas
2017	Esiliiga	3	36	21	4	11	66	57	+9	67	(Estonia) Joonas Ljaš (22)	Third round	as Rakvere JK Tarvas
2018	Esiliiga	5	36	14	10	12	59	60	−1	52	(Estonia) Siim Rannamäe (12)	Fourth round	as Rakvere JK Tarvas
2019	Esiliiga	8	36	8	4	24	35	98	−63	28	(Estonia) Siim Rannamäe (12)	Second round	as Rakvere JK Tarvas
2020	Esiliiga B	10	30	3	1	26	26	96	−70	10	(Estonia) Nevil Krimm (7)	First round	as Rakvere JK Tarvas
2021	II liiga N/E	9	23	7	6	10	38	42	−4	27	(Estonia) Roland Pakaste (8)	Second round	as Rakvere JK Tarvas
2022	II liiga N/E	2	26	18	4	4	60	20	+40	58	(Estonia) Roland Pakaste (Estonia) Mattias Roop (9)	Second round	as Rakvere JK Tarvas
2023	II liiga N/E	3	26	18	4	4	97	24	+73	58	(Estonia) Roland Pakaste (Estonia) Mattias Roop (19)	Fourth round	as Rakvere JK Tarvas
2024	II liiga N/E	3	26	17	4	5	79	28	+51	55	(Estonia) Kennert Liblik (20)		as Rakvere JK Tarvas
