= FA Tartu Kalev =

Estonian football club

- Full name: Football Academy Tartu Kalev
- Founded: 2018; 8 years ago
- Ground: Ülenurme Stadium; Ülenurme
- Capacity: 312
- Manager: Kalmer Kaasik
- League: Esiliiga B
- 2026: Esiliiga B, 7th of 10
- Website: https://fatartukalev.ee/

FA Tartu Kalev is an Estonian football club based in Tartu that competes in Esiliiga B, the third tier of Estonian football. Founded in 2018, the club acts as the football department of Tartu Kalev, a sporting association that has history dating back to 1901. The club's home ground is Ülenurme Stadium.

== Seasons and statistics ==
| Season | Division | Pos | Pld | W | D | L | GF | GA | GD | Pts | Top goalscorer | Cup |
|---|---|---|---|---|---|---|---|---|---|---|---|---|
| 2020 | III liiga E | 1 | 18 | 18 | 0 | 0 | 111 | 17 | +94 | 54 | (Estonia) Sven Karu (24) | – |
| 2021 | II liiga N/E | 1 | 23 | 17 | 4 | 2 | 70 | 30 | +40 | 55 | (Estonia) Priit Peedo (22) | – |
| 2022 | Esiliiga B | 7 | 36 | 11 | 7 | 18 | 55 | 81 | –26 | 40 | (Estonia) Priit Peedo (21) | Fourth round |
| 2023 | Esiliiga B | 4 | 36 | 18 | 7 | 11 | 85 | 71 | +14 | 61 | (Estonia) Priit Peedo (36) | Fourth round |
