= Jõhvi FC Phoenix =

Estonian football club

- Full name: Jõhvi Football Club Phoenix
- Founded: 15 August 2011; 15 years ago
- Ground: Heino Lipp Stadium
- Capacity: 794
- Manager: Vladimir Aga
- League: Esiliiga
- 2026: Esiliiga B, 4th of 10 (promoted)
- Website: https://fcphoenix.ee/
Home colours	Away colours

Jõhvi FC Phoenix is an Estonian football club based in Jõhvi that competes in Esiliiga B, the third-highest division in the Estonian football. Founded in 2011 as Jõhvi FC Lokomotiv, the club was named Jõhvi FC Phoenix in 2018. The club has competed in the Estonian top flight Premium Liiga once, in 2014.

== History ==
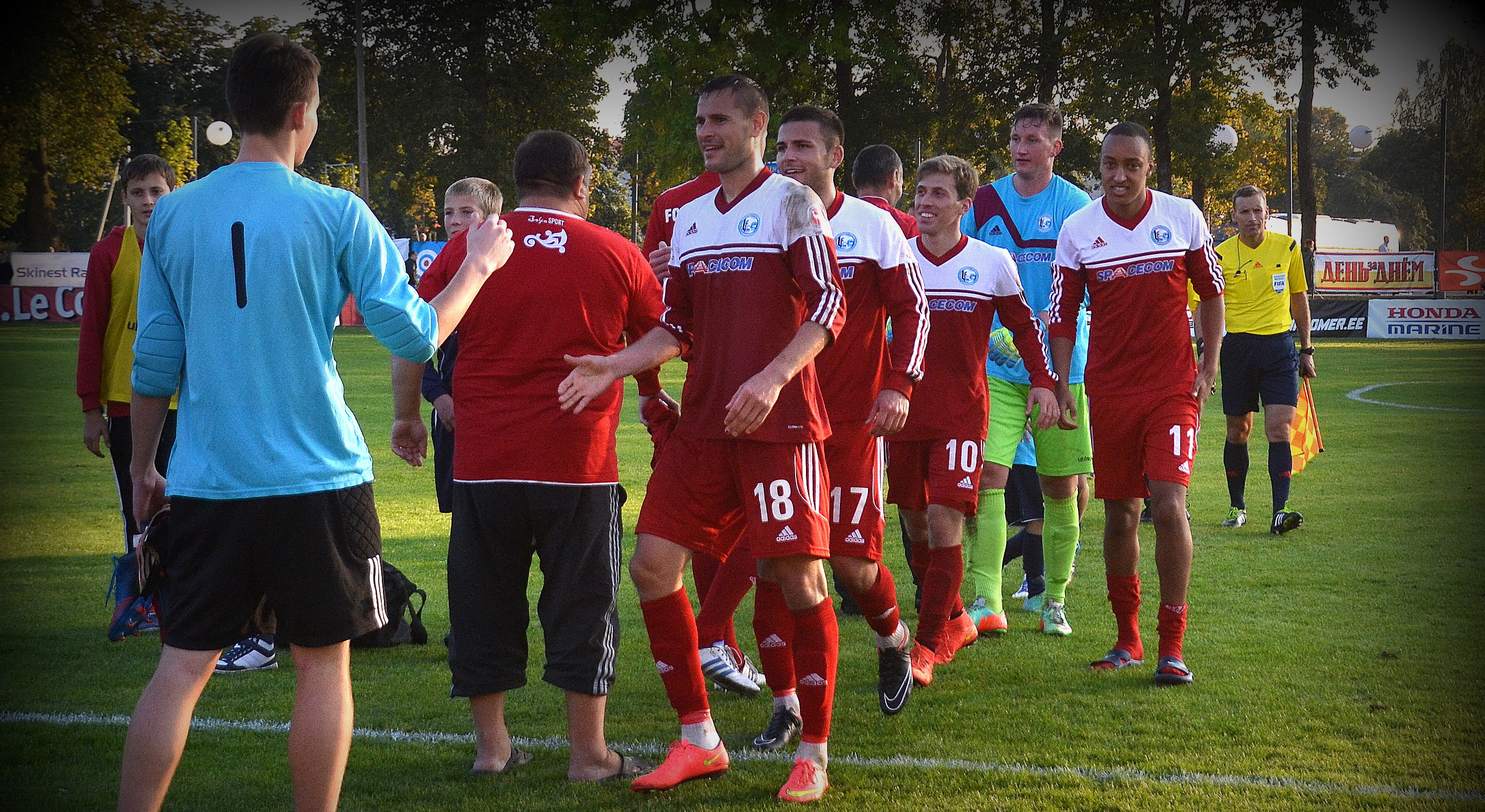
Jõhvi Phoenix (then named Jõhvi Lokomotiv) during the 2014 Premium Liiga season

The club was founded as Jõhvi FC Lokomotiv in 2011 on the basis of former football club Jõhvi JK Orbiit. They finished the 2013 season as Esiliiga runners-up and were promoted to the Estonian top division for the 2014 season. They were relegated after a single season, being defeated in the relegation play-offs by Viljandi Tulevik. Due to financial problems, the club was initially relegated to the fourth level for 2015 and after two seasons on lower levels, their players joined Kohtla-Järve JK Järve in 2017.

In 2018, the club was renamed as Jõhvi FC Phoenix and at first continued operating only on youth level. Jõhvi rejoined the senior league system in 2020 and started competing in III liiga.

== Crest and colours ==
After being founded as Jõhvi Lokomotiv in 2011, the club adopted the colours red and white. In February 2018, the club was rebranded as Jõhvi Phoenix and adopted the mythical creature phoenix as their symbol. Since then, the club has affiliated themselves with the colour orange.

2011–2017

2018–present

Jõhvi home colours 2012—2013	Jõhvi home colours 2014—2017	Jõhvi home colours 2018—2024	Jõhvi home colours 2025—present

== Stadium ==
The club's traditional home ground is the 500-seat Jõhvi linnastaadion, which served as their first team's home ground from 2011 until 2023. After gaining promotion to Esiliiga B in 2024, it was announced that the club will host their home matches at the 794-capacity Heino Lipp Stadium.

== Players ==
=== Current squad ===
As of 24 August 2016.

Note: Flags indicate national team as defined under FIFA eligibility rules; some limited exceptions apply. Players may hold more than one non-FIFA nationality.

No.	Pos.	Nation	Player
1	DF	EST	Stanislav Andrejev (on loan from JK Sillamäe Kalev)
2	MF	EST	Sergei Bazjukin
3	MF	RUS	Maksim Bazyukin
4	DF	EST	Oleg Bogdanov
5	FW	EST	Aleksandr Hlobõtsin (on loan from Kohtla-Järve JK Järve)
6	MF	EST	Maksiim Jerjomenko
7	DF	RUS	Nikolay Khvalov
8	DF	EST	Artur Korepanov
9	DF	EST	Roman Lebedev (on loan from Kohtla-Järve JK Järve)
10	MF	EST	Leonard Levdonen
11		EST	Deniss Lukin
12	FW	EST	Artur Makarov
13	GK	EST	Maksim Mamutov

No.	Pos.	Nation	Player
14	GK	EST	Aleksei Olijevski
15	MF	EST	Mark Orikov
16	MF	EST	Sergei Paltsev
17	MF	EST	Igor Poljakov
18	MF	EST	Aleksei Prištšekov
19	FW	EST	Maksim Ristimägi
20	DF	EST	Dmitri Smirnov
21		RUS	Roman Smolyar
22		EST	Pavel Zakutailo
23	MF	EST	Mihhail Tsarjov
24	MF	EST	Deniss Vender
25	MF	EST	Nikita Volkov

== Seasons and statistics ==
Season	Division	Pos	Games	W	D	L	GF	GA	GD	Points	Top goalscorers	Estonian Cup
Jõhvi JK Orbiit
1999	IV Liiga East	1	20	13	3	4	44	22	+22	42	(Estonia) Ruslan Berov (14)	
2000	III Liiga East	2	16	9	3	4	39	25	+14	30	(Estonia) Jevgeni Gužovski (9)	
2001	III Liiga East	8	18	4	5	9	32	44	−8	17	4 players (5)	
2002	III Liiga East	2	18	10	6	2	59	24	+25	36	(Estonia) Sergei Kuzmitšov (23)	
2003	III Liiga East	5	18	8	4	6	46	36	+10	26	(Estonia) Aleksandr Kulatšenko (13)	
2004	III Liiga East	4	18	10	1	7	62	30	+32	31	(Estonia) Vadim Lavrenko (10)	
2005	III Liiga East	1	22	15	6	0	69	22	+47	51	(Estonia) Aleksandr Marašov (14)	
2006	II Liiga East/North	6	28	11	5	12	47	44	+3	38	(Estonia) Andrei Kulatšenko (11)	
2007	II Liiga East/North	5	26	12	6	8	45	26	+19	42	(Estonia) Igor Rogov (11)	
2008	II Liiga East/North	4	26	14	6	6	68	28	+40	48	(Estonia) Aleksandr Marašov (16)	-
2009	II Liiga East/North	1	26	18	5	3	84	36	+48	59	(Russia) Aleksandr Avdeev (23)	Fourth round
2010	Esiliiga	10	36	6	4	26	35	82	−47	22	(Estonia) Aleksandr Marašov (8)	Third round
2011	II Liiga East/North	5	26	11	8	7	48	37	+9	41	(Estonia) Jevgeni Gužovski (12)	First round
as Jõhvi FC Lokomotiv
2012	II liiga E/N	1	26	20	6	0	79	16	+63	66	(Estonia) Vassili Kulik (18)	Third round
2013	Esiliiga	2	36	20	9	7	80	39	+41	69	(Estonia) Andrei Jõgi (13)	First round
2014	Meistriliiga	9	36	4	6	26	35	115	−80	18	(Russia) Aleksandr Nikulin (6)	Quarter-finals
2015	II liiga E/N	4	26	16	3	7	67	38	+29	51	(Estonia) Maksim Ristimägi, (Georgia (country)) Georgi Arkania (12)	Quarter-finals
2016	II liiga E/N	2	26	15	7	4	67	33	+34	52	(Estonia) Artur Makarov (25)	–
as Jõhvi FC Phoenix
2020	III liiga E	7	18	7	1	10	39	46	–7	22	(Estonia) Deniss Komšin (9)	–
2021	III liiga E	2	20	17	1	2	65	20	+45	52	(Estonia) Artur Salmus, (Romania) Nichita Gorea (12)	–
2022	II liiga E/N	9	26	9	1	16	36	58	–22	28	(Romania) Nichita Gorea (16)	Second round
2023	II liiga E/N	2	26	18	4	4	97	22	+75	58	(Estonia) Jelissei Zahharov (34)	Quarter-finals
