= Mati Pari =

Estonian footballer

Personal information
- Full name: Mati Pari
- Date of birth: 4 September 1974 (age 52)
- Place of birth: Viljandi, then part of Estonian SSR, Soviet Union
- Height: 1.86 m (6 ft 1 in)
- Position: Midfielder

International career^{‡}
Years	Team	Apps	(Gls)
1994–1998	Estonia	22	(1)
- ‡ National team caps and goals as of 23 May 2009

Mati Pari (born 4 September 1974) is a retired football (soccer) midfielder from Estonia. He played for several clubs, including FC Flora Tallinn, FC Levadia Tallinn and FC Flora Rakvere.

== International career ==
Pari earned his first official cap for the Estonia national football team on 9 March 1994, when Estonia played Cyprus in a friendly match. He obtained a total of 22 caps. Pari was an assistant coach at FC Levadia in 2010 and a youth coach in 2011–2015. In 2016, he coached the youth team of JK Tabasalu. In 2017, he started as a youth coach at JK Tallinna Kalev.
