= Heino Lipp Stadium =

Stadium in Jõhvi, Estonia

- Heino Lipu staadion
- Interactive map of Heino Lipp Stadium
- Location: Jõhvi, Ida-Viru County, Estonia
- Coordinates: 59.35042°N 27.41783°E

Tenant
- Jõhvi FC Phoenix (2024-present)

Heino Lipp Stadium (Estonian: Heino Lipu staadion) is an athletics and football stadium in Jõhvi, Estonia. It is the only sports venue in Estonia named after a specific person. It is and will be designated as "class 2" according to the certification system of the International Association of Athletics Federations until July 2028.

== History ==
On June 28, 2026, at the Estonian Athletics Championships, Indrek Tobreluts set a new world record in the M50 age category, running the 3000m steeplechase in 9:28.24.

== Henri Lipp Sculpture ==
In July 2024, the NGO Heino Lipp Foundation proposed moving the Heino Lipp monument, unveiled in 2022, from the Maidla Manor Park to the stadium in Jõhvi. The monument was originally planned to be moved in the fall or spring of 2025. Sculptor Aivar Simson also approved this idea.

On May 19, 2025, the sculpture was transported to Jõhvi, and the grand opening took place on May 22 of that year.
