= Narva Kalev-Fama Stadium =

Football stadium in Narva, Estonia

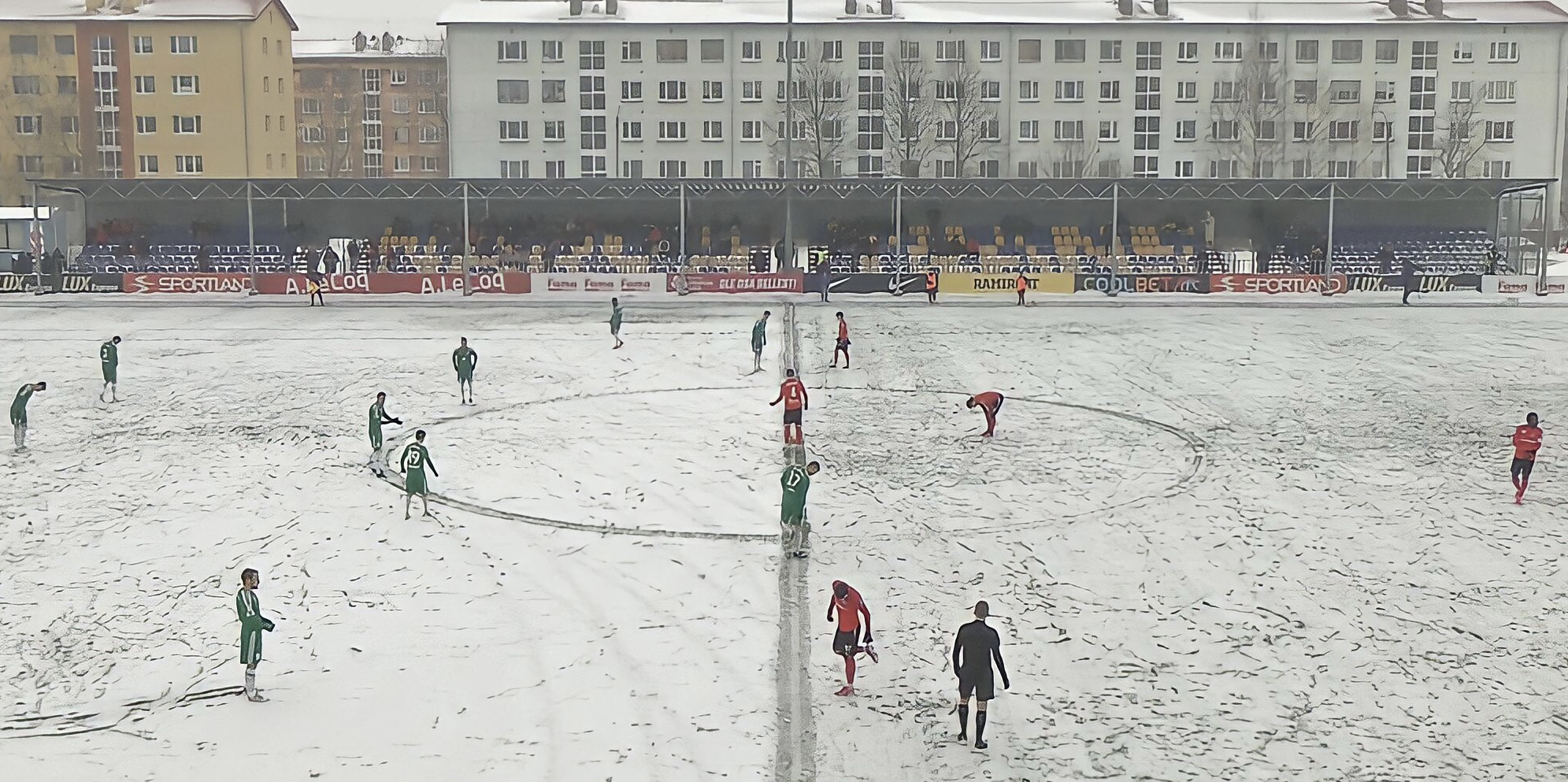
- Kalev-Fama Stadium hosting Narva Trans - FCI Levadia in the winter of 2021
- Former names: Garnisoni staadion Narva Kalevi staadion
- Location: Narva, Estonia
- Coordinates: 59°22′54.6″N 28°11′17.5″E
- Operator: JK Narva Trans
- Capacity: 1,104
- Field size: 105 × 68 m
- Surface: Artificial turf

Construction
- Opened: 1931; 94 years ago
- Renovated: 2010–2013, 2025

Tenants
- JK Narva Trans

Narva Kalev-Fama Stadium is a football stadium in Narva, Estonia. With a capacity of 1,000, it is home to JK Narva Trans, who uses the stadium as a training base, as well as a home ground during winter and early spring months.

The name of the stadium originates from Narva's former 17th century fortification named Fama Bastion.

== History ==
The construction of the stadium started in 1926 and was conducted by the Narva Garrison. Subsequently, the stadium was named as Garnisoni staadion and opened with a grand ceremony by Jaan Hünerson and Aleksander Tõnisson in August 1931. Before that, the field was known as Rahva väli and Sõjawäli.

After World War II, the stadium was known as Narva Kalevi staadion and was the main sports ground of the city until the construction of Kreenholm Stadium saw the stadium turn into a semi-abandoned sports facility.

After major renovations, the stadium was re-opened on 12 October 2013 as Kalev-Fama Stadium. In 2017, a roof was installed for the grandstand.

On 31 August 2018, the stadium was visited by then President of Estonia Kersti Kaljulaid, who watched Narva Trans draw 1–1 with Pärnu Vaprus.

Kalev-Fama Stadium was the venue for the 2020 Estonian Supercup final and saw Flora defeat Narva Trans 2–0.

In 2025, Narva Trans announced they will play their entire league campaign at the Kalev-Fama Stadium due to Kreenholm Stadium's poor condition. In May 2025, the stadium was fitted with a new FIFA Quality Pro artificial turf surface.
