= Valeri Bondarenko =

Estonian footballer and coach

Personal information
- Date of birth: 22 April 1953 (age 73)
- Place of birth: Võru, then part of Estonian SSR, Soviet Union
- Position: Midfielder

Valeri Bondarenko (born 22 April 1953) is an Estonian football coach and a former player. A midfielder, he played for Norma Tallinn from 1971 to 1979.

From 1993 to 1994, he was the assistant coach of the Estonia national team. From 1998 to 1999, he was an assistant and head coach of the Estonian U18 team. In 1997–1998, 1999–2000, 2004–2008, 2010, 2013–2014 and he was the coach of Narva Trans, from 2000 to 2003 FC Levadia's coach, and from 2008 to 2009 Rovaniemi PS's coach. He briefly managed the Russian Second Division club Lokomotiv Nizhny Novgorod during 2004.

He was the head coach of the Swedish football club Syrianska FC from 26 January 2011 until the end of the 2011 season.

From 2019 he has been the academy manager of Narva Trans and multiple times the caretaker manager of their main team.

== Honours ==
Individual

- Meistriliiga Manager of the Month: May 2013
