= FCI Levadia U21 Tallinn =

Estonian football reserve team

FCI Levadia U21
- Full name: FCI Levadia U21
- Founded: 1999; 27 years ago
- Ground: Maarjamäe Stadium
- President: Viktor Levada
- Manager: Santiago Garcia Carrero
- League: Esiliiga
- 2026: Esiliiga, 3rd of 10
- Website: fclevadia.ee
Home colours	Away colours

FCI Levadia U21 Tallinn, commonly known as FCI Levadia U21, is an Estonian football club based in Tallinn.

The club was founded in 1999 as FC Maardu. In 2001, the club was renamed to FC Levadia Tallinn after becoming the reserve team of Levadia Maardu. In 2004, Levadia Maardu moved to Tallinn and became the new FC Levadia Tallinn, while the reserve team (the old Levadia Tallinn) became FC Levadia Tallinn II (later renamed to FC Levadia Tallinn U21 in 2016).

Reserve teams in Estonia play in the same league system as the senior team, rather than in a reserve team league. They must play at least one level below their main side, however, so Levadia U21 is ineligible for promotion to the Meistriliiga but can play in the Estonian Cup. As Levadia Tallinn, the club has won 1 Estonian Cup trophy.

In December 2017, FC Levadia Tallinn and FCI Tallinn merged to become FCI Levadia Tallinn, which resulted in their reserves also joining and becoming FCI Levadia U21 Tallinn

== Honours ==
- Esiliiga

Winners (6): 2006, 2007, 2008, 2009, 2010, 2013

- Estonian Cup

Winners (1): 2001–02

After winning the Estonian Cup they played in the 2002–03 UEFA Cup.

== Players ==
=== First-team squad ===
As of 24 July 2026

Note: Flags indicate national team as defined under FIFA eligibility rules; some limited exceptions apply. Players may hold more than one non-FIFA nationality.

No.	Pos.	Nation	Player
1	GK	EST	Kaarel Ruus
4	DF	EST	Jevgeni Tšernjakov
28	DF	EST	Tristan Zahovaiko
28	MF	EST	Mark-Julian Travin
29	DF	EST	Alexey Sažin
30	DF	EST	Hubert Liiv
32	DF	EST	Karl Markus Püvi
44	DF	EST	Karl Kompus
45	FW	EST	Nikita Muravljov
49	GK	EST	Teodor Sibul
57	FW	EST	Fjodor Rodionov
58	MF	EST	Artem Fesenko
59	GK	EST	Daniil Abramenko

No.	Pos.	Nation	Player
60	FW	EST	Hugo Sõnitsar
63	FW	EST	Bogdan Mirošnitšenko
64	MF	EST	Maksim Gussev (captain)
66	MF	EST	Andreas Kompus
67	DF	EST	Trevor Elhi
68	MF	EST	Mohamed Ouertani
70	MF	EST	Aleksei Tšernjakov
80	FW	EST	Vjatšeslav Pavlovitš
88	FW	EST	Maksim Laskov
96	FW	EST	Artjom Timakov
97	DF	EST	Jan Hamburg
98	GK	EST	Sander Lepp

=== Out on loan ===
Note: Flags indicate national team as defined under FIFA eligibility rules; some limited exceptions apply. Players may hold more than one non-FIFA nationality.

No.	Pos.	Nation	Player

== Personnel ==
=== Current technical staff ===
Position	Name
Manager	(Spain) Santiago García Carrero
Assistant manager	(Russia) Nikita Andreev
Assistant manager	(Estonia) Artjom Artjunin
Assistant manager	(Estonia) Nikita Martõnov
Goalkeeping coach	(Estonia) Artur Kotenko

=== Managerial history ===
Dates	Name
2000–2001	(Estonia) Eduard Võrk
2002–2003	(Estonia) Valeri Bondarenko
2008–2010	(Russia) Aleksandr Pushtov
2011	(Estonia) Mati Pari
2012–2016	(Estonia) Argo Arbeiter
2016–2019	(Estonia) Vladimir Vassiljev
2019–2021	(Estonia) Robert Sadovski
2022	(Serbia) Ivan Stojković
2022	(Russia) Nikita Andreev
2022–	(Spain) Santiago García Carrero
