= Aivar Lillevere =

Estonian footballer

Personal information
- Date of birth: 23 January 1962 (age 64)
- Place of birth: Põltsamaa, Estonia

Senior career*
Years	Team	Apps	(Gls)
- Viljandi Linnameeskond
- Tulevik
1993–1995	Porvoon Weikot		
1997	Tulevik II	1	(0)

Managerial career
- Porvoon Weikot women
- 1998–1999: Tulevik (assistant)
- 2000: Tulevik
- 2000: Estonia
- 2001–2002: Tulevik (assistant)
- 2003–2004: Tulevik
- 2005–2008: Elva
- 2006: Estonia U19
- 2008: Estonia women
- 2009: Tulevik II
- 2009–2011: Estonia U17
- 2009–2012: Estonia U18 (assistant)
- 2011: Flora II
- 2011–2012: Flora II (assistant)
- 2012: Flora III
- 2013: Estonia U16 (assistant)
- 2013–2017: Tulevik
- 2014–2016: Estonia U19 (assistant)
- * Club domestic league appearances and goals

Aivar Lillevere (born 23 January 1962) is an Estonian football manager and former football player.

Lillevere has managed Tulevik, Elva, and Estonian under-16, under-17, under-18, and under-19 national sides.

In February 2000, Lillevere managed the Estonia national team during the 2000 King's Cup.

On 21 May 2008, Lillevere was appointed manager of the Estonia women's national football team.

== Honours ==
=== Manager ===
Tulevik

- Esiliiga: 2016

Estonia Women

- Women's Baltic Cup: 2008

Individual

- Meistriliiga Manager of the Month: May 2015
