= FC Puuma Tallinn =

Estonian football club

F.C. Puuma Tallinn
- Full name: Football Club Puuma Tallinn
- Founded: October 23, 1981; 43 years ago
- Ground: Nike Arena Tallinn, Tallinn
- Chairman: Vitaly Kobashov
- Manager: Eduard Tchurkin
- 2024 II liiga: II liiga, 2nd of 14
- Website: http://www.fcpuuma.ee/

FC Puuma Tallinn (Estonian: Tallinna Jalgpalliklubi "Puuma") is an Estonian football club based in Tallinn. The club was founded on 23 October 1981.
