= FC Kiviõli Irbis =

Estonian football club

Irbis
- Full name: Kiviõli Football Club Irbis
- Founded: 1999
- Dissolved: 2016
- Ground: Kiviõli Stadium, Kiviõli
- 2016: II Liiga, withdraw
Home colours	Away colours

Kiviõli FC Irbis was an Estonian football club based in Kiviõli. Founded in 1999 as Kiviõli Tamme Auto, in 2013 they merged with a local youth team and changed their name to Irbis. The club were members of Esiliiga, the second tier of Estonian football system for eight seasons between 2008 and 2015. Their highest league finish came in 2011 with 3rd position in Esiliiga, missing the promotion play-off to top flight with just one point.

Club's logo (2009–2012)
