= Jõhvi linnastaadion =

Stadium in Jõhvi, Estonia

Coordinates: 59.355844°N 27.418826°E

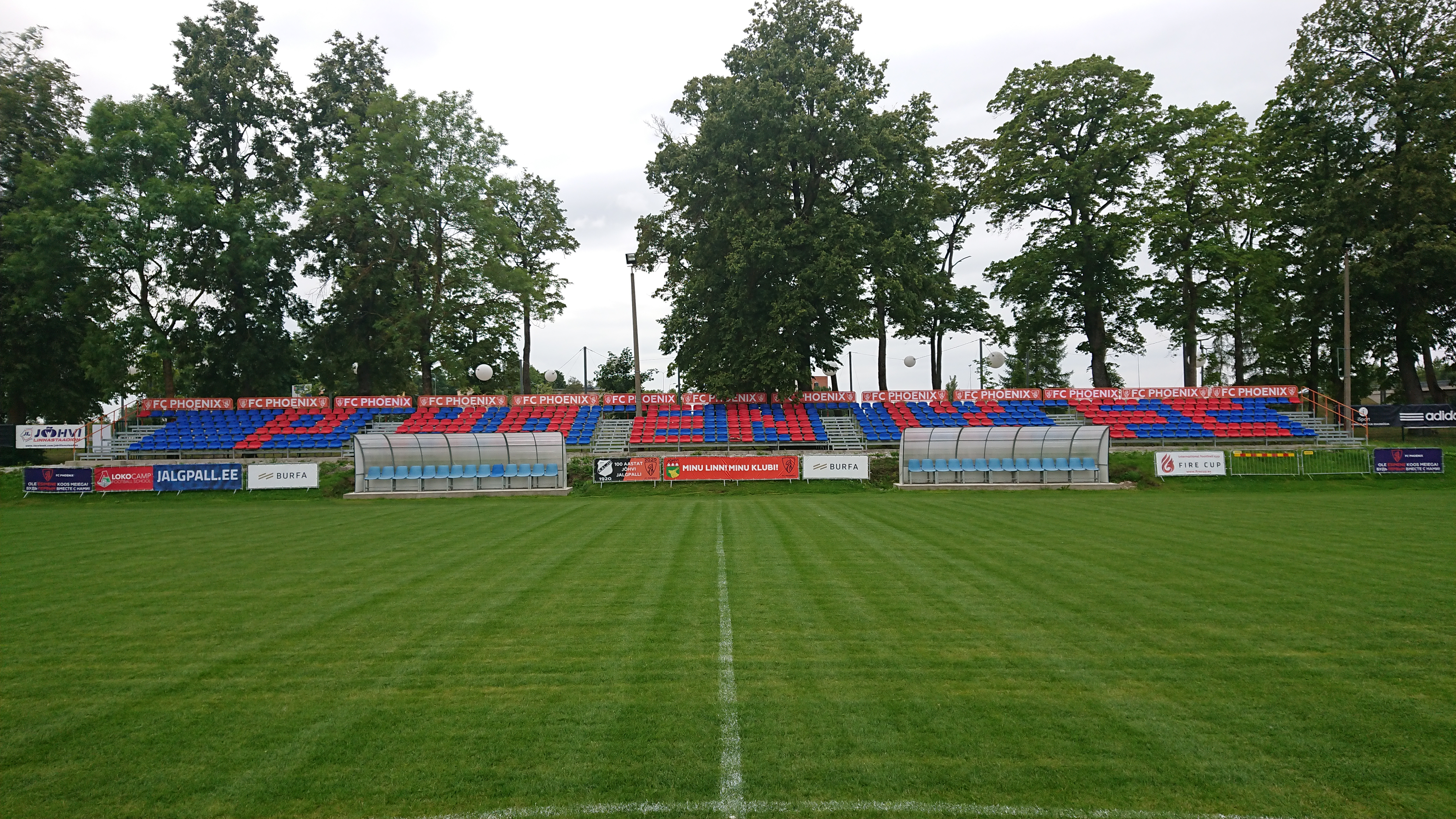
- Interactive map of Jõhvi linnastaadion
- Location: Jõhvi, Estonia
- Owner: Town of Jõhvi
- Capacity: 500
- Surface: Grass

Construction
- Groundbreaking: 1929
- Opened: 1933
- Renovated: 2016

Tenants
- Eesti Põlevkivi Jõhvi (1974−1999); Jõhvi FC Phoenix (2011−present)

Jõhvi linnastaadion is a football stadium in Jõhvi, Estonia. It is the home ground of Jõhvi FC Phoenix and has a seating capacity of 500.
