= Rakvere linnastaadion =

Stadium in Rakvere, Estonia

Coordinates: 59°20′37.3″N 26°21′30.2″E

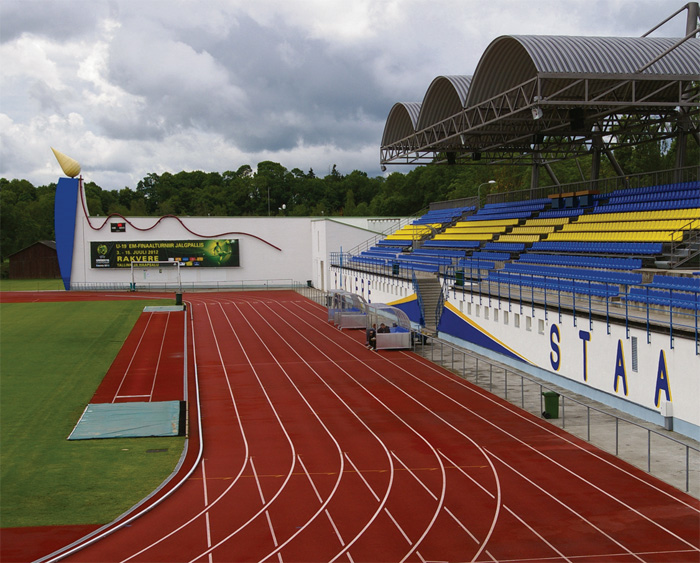
- Location: Rakvere, Estonia
- Owner: Rakvere Municipality
- Operator: Rakvere Spordikeskus
- Capacity: 1,831
- Surface: Grass
- Field size: 104 × 68 m

Construction
- Groundbreaking: 1929
- Opened: 29 May 1930; 96 years ago
- Rebuilt: 2004; 22 years ago
- Cost: 12 million EEK (2004)

Tenants
- Rakvere Kalev (1930–1972); Rakvere Tarvas (2004–present)

Rakvere linnastaadion (English: Rakvere City (or Municipal) Stadium) is a multi-purpose stadium in Rakvere, Estonia. The stadium has 1,831 seats and is the home ground of Rakvere JK Tarvas. The address of the stadium is Kastani puiestee 12, Rakvere.

Although a small venue, the stadium has hosted two UEFA European youth Football Championships: the 2012 UEFA European Under-19 Championship and the 2026 UEFA European Under-17 Championship. Matches at the stadium have featured future international footballers such as Paul Pogba, Harry Kane, and Aleksandar Mitrović.

The stadium has also hosted one Estonia national football team match, several Europa League qualification matches of Narva Trans, and a season of Estonian top-flight football when Tarvas played in the Meistriliiga in the 2016 season.

== History ==
The construction of Rakvere Stadium began in 1929, and the stadium was opened with a grand ceremony on 29 May 1930 by the Mayor of Rakvere Heinrich Aviksoo.

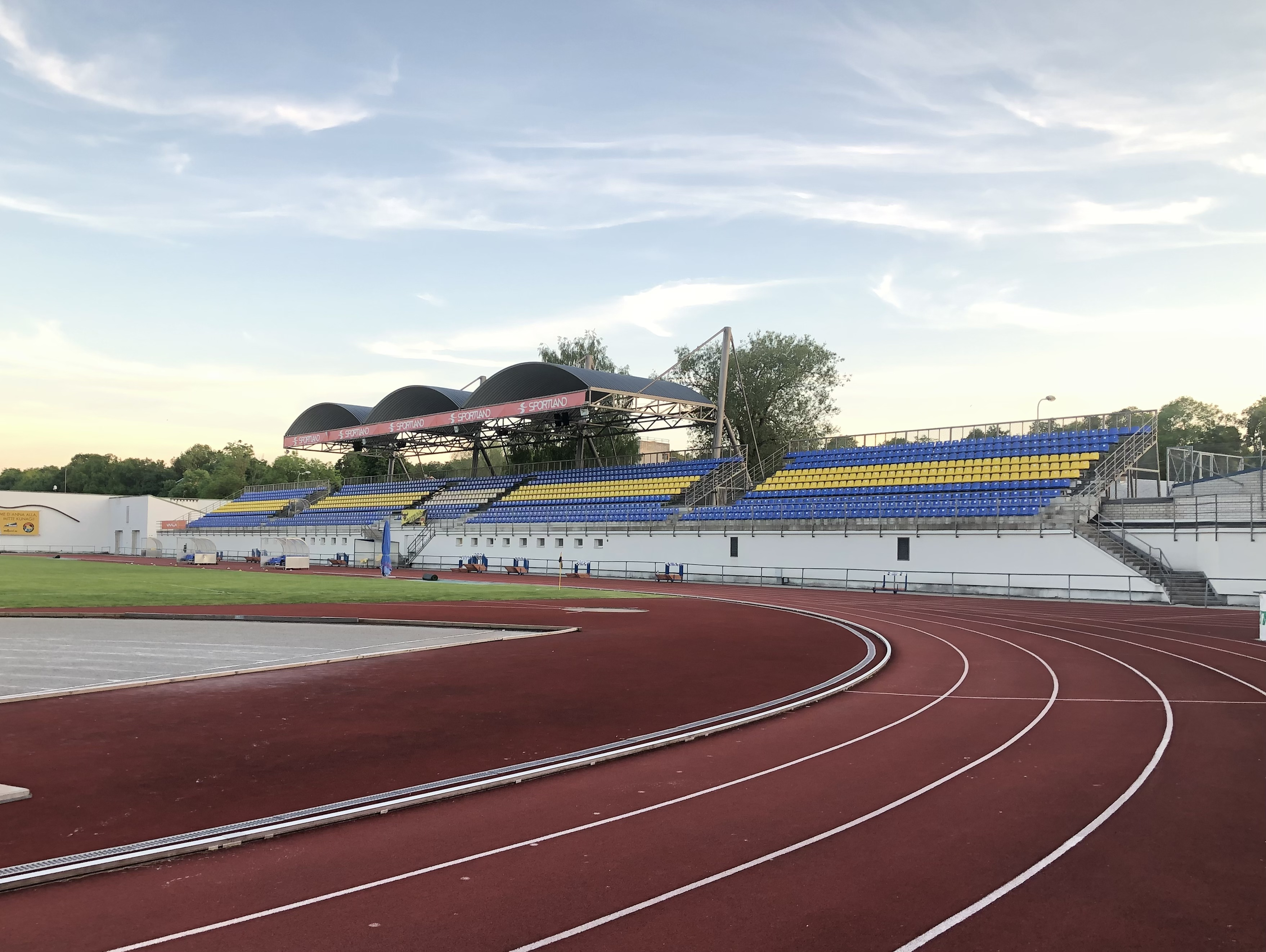
Rakvere linnastaadion in 2021

In 2004, an investment of 60 million EEK (more than 3.8 million euros) was made for the construction of the Rakvere Sports Centre, which included completely rebuilding the stadium for 12 million EEK.

On 3 August 2010, after his four-year doping ban, Justin Gatlin made his return to athletics in Rakvere, where he set the stadium record in 100 meters with a time of 10.24 seconds. Seven years later, Gatlin became the 100 meters world champion, taking the throne from Usain Bolt.

On 15 June 2025, 12 youth and adult dance companies with 2,000 dancers were on the stadium field, participating in the Virumaa Dance Festival Virupärane (Viru style or Typically Viru).

== 2012 UEFA European U19 Championship matches ==
3 July 2012
18:45
Group B

Serbia	0–3	France
	Report	Samnick 17'; Pogba 26' (pen.); Vion 32'

Attendance: 1,827
Referee: Arnold Hunter (Northern Ireland)
6 July 2012
17:30
Group B

Serbia	1–2	England
Ninković 70'	Report	Afobe 6'; Redmond 63'

Attendance: 1,712
Referee: Kenn Hansen (Denmark)
9 July 2012
20:00
Group B

Croatia	3–0	Serbia
Pavičić 2'; Pongračić 49', 57'	Report

Attendance: 1,647
Referee: Paolo Valeri (Italy)

== 2026 UEFA European U17 Championship matches ==
25 May 2026
14:30 EEST
Group A

Croatia	0–2	Belgium
	Report	Driessen 9'; Moorthamer 13'

Attendance: 436
Referee: Florian Lata (Albania)
28 May 2026
14:30 EEST
Group A

Belgium	0–1	Spain
	Report	Badji 9'

Attendance: 715
Referee: Alexandros Tsakalidis (Greece)
31 May 2026
14:30 EEST
Group A

Spain	2−3	Croatia
Sánchez 56'; Alves 77'	Report	Dedić 3', 82', 89'

Attendance: 727
Referee: Konstantinos Fellas (Cyprus)

== Estonia national team match ==
Date		Result	Competition	Attendance
30 May 2018	Estonia – Lithuania	2–0	2018 Baltic Cup	1,460
