= Viljandi linnastaadion =

Stadium in Viljandi, Estonia

Coordinates: 58°21′40.16″N 25°36′25.32″E

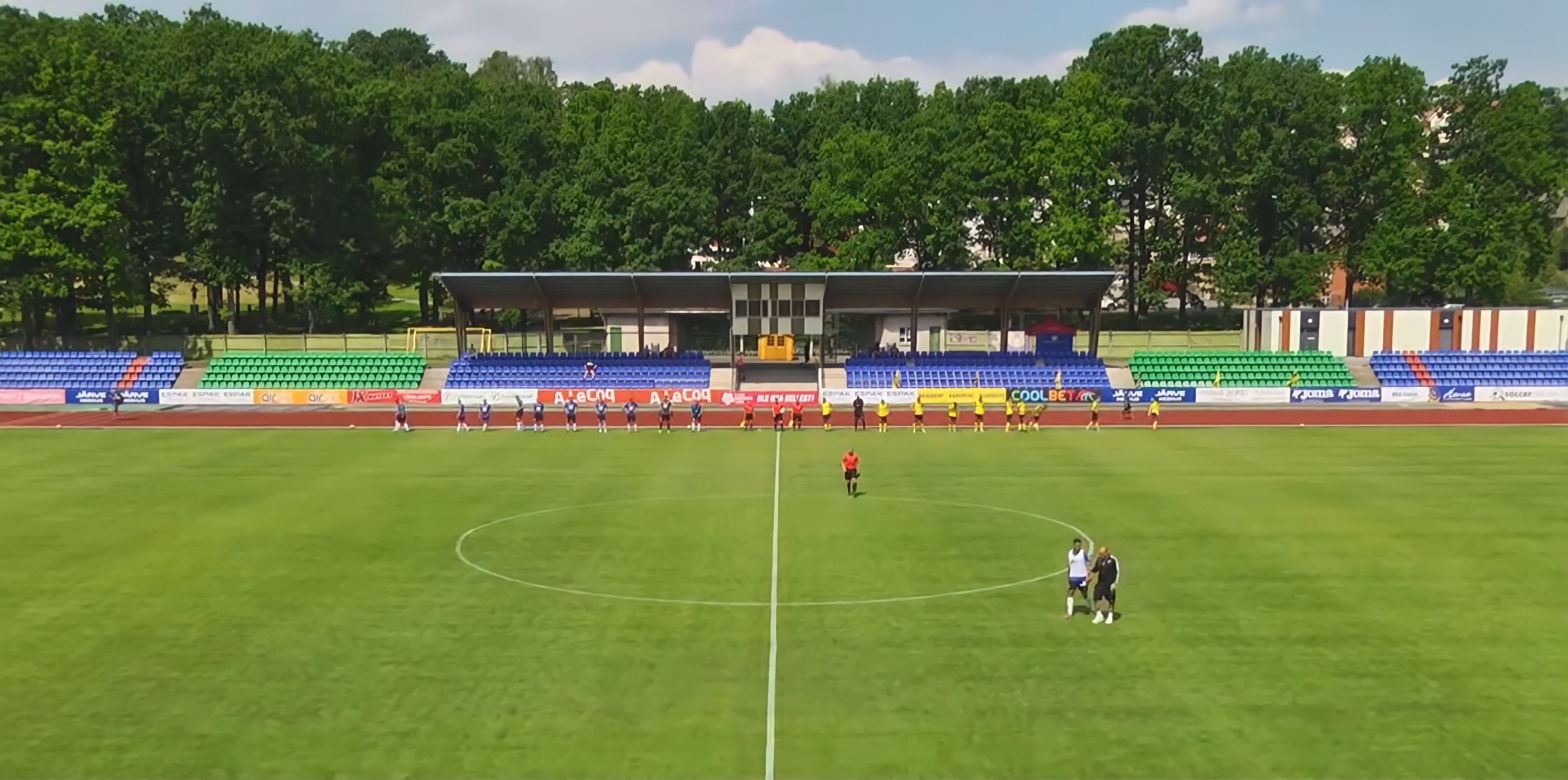
- Interactive map of Viljandi linnastaadion
- Location: Viljandi, Estonia
- Owner: City of Viljandi
- Operator: MA Viljandi Spordikeskus
- Capacity: 1,068
- Surface: Grass
- Field size: 102 × 68 m

Construction
- Opened: 1929; 97 years ago
- Renovated: 1960, 1989, 2008–2009, 2021, 2022
- Cost: €1.51 million (2009)

Tenants
- Viljandi Tulevik (1929–1940, 1992–present); FC Viljandi (2011–2012)

Viljandi linnastaadion is a multi-purpose stadium in Viljandi, Estonia. Opened in 1929 and located by Lake Viljandi, it is the home ground of Viljandi JK Tulevik. The stadium has 1,068 seats, of which 386 are under the roof.

== History ==
The construction of the stadium started in 1928, when the mayor of Viljandi was August Maramaa. The sports ground was officially opened in June 1929, although the construction was not fully finished and due to a downturn in economy, the works were then halted for several years. The stadium was renovated in 1960 and in 1989.

Extensive renovation works began at Viljandi linnastaadion in May 2008 and the stadium was reopened on 16 June 2009, reaching its current look. In 2010, the administrative building was completed.

== Estonia national team matches ==
Viljandi has hosted three Estonia national football team matches.

Date		Result	Competition	Attendance
4 June 1997	Estonia – Azerbaijan	1–0	Friendly	2,000
16 May 1998	Estonia – Azerbaijan	0–0	Friendly	1,500
28 June 1998	Estonia – Lithuania	0–0	1998 Baltic Cup	450
