= 1994–95 Meistriliiga =

Estonian national championships in football

Meistriliiga
- Season: 1994–95
- Champions: Flora (2nd title)
- Relegated: Norma; DAG
- UEFA Cup: Flora
- Cup Winners' Cup: Lantana-Marlekor
- Intertoto Cup: Tervis
- Top goalscorer: Serhiy Morozov (25)

The 1994–95 Meistriliiga was the fourth season of the Meistriliiga, Estonia's premier football league. Flora won their second title.

== Preliminary round ==
=== League table ===
Pos	Team	Pld	W	D	L	GF	GA	GD	Pts	Qualification
1	Flora	14	10	4	0	32	4	+28	34	Qualification for Championship Tournament
2	Lantana-Marlekor	14	10	3	1	44	7	+37	33	Qualification for Championship Tournament
3	Narva Trans	14	7	5	2	23	9	+14	26	Qualification for Championship Tournament
4	Tallinna Sadam	14	7	4	3	29	11	+18	25	Qualification for Championship Tournament
5	Eesti Põlevkivi Jõhvi	14	5	3	6	25	16	+9	18	Qualification for Championship Tournament
6	Norma	14	3	1	10	9	51	−42	10	Qualification for Championship Tournament
7	PJK Kalev	14	2	1	11	12	35	−23	7	Qualification for Meistriliiga Transition Tournament
8	DAG	14	1	1	12	6	47	−41	4	Qualification for Meistriliiga Transition Tournament

=== Results ===
Home \ Away	FLO	NOR	LAN	TRS	SAD	JEP	DAG	PJK
Flora		12–0	0–0	2–1	2–2	0–0	2–0	3–0
Norma	0–3		0–3	0–3	2–2	0–4	2–0	1–2
Lantana-Marlekor	0–2	10–0		0–0	1–0	4–1	11–0	5–1
Narva Trans	1–1	1–0	0–1		0–0	2–0	+:-	6–1
Tallinna Sadam	0–2	6–0	1–1	0–1		2–0	3–0	3–1
Eesti Põlevkivi Jõhvi	0–1	4–0	0–1	2–2	1–2		3–0	1–1
DAG	0–2	1–2	1–5	2–2	0–5	0–6		2–0
PJK Kalev	-:+	0–2	1–2	0–4	0–3	1–3	4–0	

Legend: Blue = home team win; Yellow = draw; Red = away team win.

== Championship Tournament ==
The points obtained during the preliminary round were carried over halved and rounded up.

=== League table ===
Pos	Team	Pld	W	D	L	GF	GA	GD	BP	Pts	Qualification or relegation
1	Flora (C)	10	7	3	0	27	6	+21	17	41	Qualification for UEFA Cup preliminary round
2	Lantana-Marlekor	10	7	2	1	26	9	+17	17	40	Qualification for Cup Winners' Cup qualifying round
3	Narva Trans	10	4	1	5	9	15	−6	13	26	
4	Tallinna Sadam	10	4	0	6	11	14	−3	13	25	
5	Eesti Põlevkivi Jõhvi	10	4	0	6	17	24	−7	9	21	
6	Norma (R)	10	1	0	9	6	28	−22	5	8	Qualification for relegation play-offs (Note: By the decision of FIFA, the Estonian FA was forced to take FC Tevalte Tallinn (disqualified one round before the end of the 1993/94 season because of match-fixing without proof) back to the Estonian FA and give the club a place in the Meistriliiga 1995-96 season. Therefore extra Relegation play-off was arranged between the sixth team of the final round and the second team of the Premier Division Promotion Tournament.)

(C) Champions; (R) Relegated

=== Results ===
Home \ Away	FLO	LAN	TRS	SAD	JEP	NOR
Flora		1–1	3–0	2–0	6–0	4–2
Lantana-Marlekor	1–1		1–4	2–1	4–1	4–0
Narva Trans	1–1	0–3		0–1	2–1	0–1
Tallinna Sadam	0–3	0–5	0–1		4–0	2–0
Eesti Põlevkivi Jõhvi	0–3	1–3	4–0	1–0		4–1
Norma	1–3	0–2	0–1	0–3	1–5	

Legend: Blue = home team win; Yellow = draw; Red = away team win.

== Meistriliiga Transition Tournament ==
Pos	Team	Pld	W	D	L	GF	GA	GD	Pts	Qualification or relegation
1	Tervis (P)	10	7	1	2	32	8	+24	22	Promotion to Meistriliiga & Qualification for UEFA Intertoto Cup group stage
2	PJK Kalev	10	6	0	4	35	24	+11	18	Qualification for relegation play-offs
3	TJK	10	6	0	4	20	20	0	18	Relegation to Esiliiga
4	Dünamo	10	4	3	3	43	16	+27	15	Relegation to Esiliiga
5	Lelle	10	3	1	6	8	44	−36	10	Relegation to Esiliiga
6	DAG (R)	10	0	3	7	8	34	−26	3	Relegation to Esiliiga

(P) Promoted; (R) Relegated

== Relegation play-off ==
1995

Norma	2–3	PJK Kalev

1995

PJK Kalev	0–0	Norma

PJK Kalev won 3–2 on aggregate and retained their Meistriliiga spot for the 1995–96 season. Norma were relegated to the 1995-96 Esiliiga.

== Top scorers ==
Rank	Player	Club	Goals
1	(Ukraine) Serhiy Morozov	Lantana/Marlekor	25
2	(Lithuania) Ričardas Zdančius	Flora	12
3	(Russia) Sergei Afanasyev	Eesti Põlevkivi	11
4	(Estonia) Maksim Gruznov	Lantana/Marlekor	9
4	(Estonia) Toomas Krõm	Flora	9
4	(Estonia) Dmitri Ustritski	Tallinna Sadam	9
7	(Estonia) Juri Braiko	Eesti Põlevkivi	8
7	(Estonia) Andrei Krõlov	Tallinna Sadam	8
7	(Estonia) Martin Reim	Flora	8

== See also ==
- 1994 in Estonian football
- 1995 in Estonian football
- 1994–95 Esiliiga
