= 1996 in Estonian football =

- Meistriliiga champions
- FC Lantana/Marlekor
- Esiliiga champions
- JK Vall Tallinn
- Estonian Cup winners
- Tallinna Sadam JK
- Teams in Europe
- Tallinna Sadam JK, FC Lantana/Marlekor
- Estonian national team
- 1996 Baltic Cup; 1998 FIFA World Cup qualification
- Estonian Footballer of the Year
- Marek Lemsalu

The 1996 season was the fifth full year of competitive football (soccer) in Estonia since gaining independence from the Soviet Union on 20 August 1991.

== Estonian FA Cup ==
=== Semifinals ===
FC Lantana Tallinn	0 – 1 0 – 0	Tallinna Sadam JK

Tevalte/Marlekor	1 – 0 0 – 2	JK Eesti Põlevkivi Jõhvi

=== Final ===
Tallinna Sadam JK	2–0	JK Eesti Põlevkivi Jõhvi

== National Team ==
Date	Venue	Opponents	Score	Comp	Estonia scorers	Fixture
1996-02-16	GSZ Stadium; Larnaca	Azerbaijan	0 – 0	F		—
1996-02-20	Tsirion Stadium; Limassol	Cyprus	1 – 0	F		—
1996-02-24	GSZ Stadium; Larnaca	Faroe Islands	2 – 2	F	Kristal 13'; Rajala 45'	—
1996-04-24	Kadrioru Stadium; Tallinn	Iceland	0 – 3	F		—
1996-05-29	Kadrioru Stadium; Tallinn	Turkey	0 – 0	F		—
1996-07-07	Kreenholmi Stadium; Narva	Latvia	1 – 1	BC96	U. Rooba 36'	—
1996-07-09	Kreenholmi Stadium; Narva	Lithuania	1 – 1	BC96	Reim 21' (pen.)	—
1996-08-31	Dinamo Stadium; Minsk	Belarus	1 – 0	WCQ98		—
1996-10-05	Kadrioru Stadium; Tallinn	Belarus	1 – 0	WCQ98	Hohlov-Simson 51'	—
1996-10-30	Arto Tolsa Areena; Kotka	Finland	2 – 2	F	M. Rooba 65'; Kirs 80'	—
1996-11-13	Estadi Communal; Andorra la Vella	Andorra	1 – 6	F	Zelinski 36'; Arbeiter 64' 74' 76' 84'; Kristal 87'	—
1996-11-16	Stadio Luigi Ferraris; Genoa	Indonesia	0 – 3	F	Zelinski 6' 45' 71'	—
