= 1996–97 Estonian Cup =

Seventh season of the Estonian main domestic football cup

Eesti Karikas

Tournament details
- Country: Estonia
- Teams: 40

Final positions
- Champions: Tallinna Sadam (2nd title)
- Runners-up: Lantana

Tournament statistics
- Matches played: 44
- Goals scored: 194 (4.41 per match)

The 1996–97 Estonian Cup (Estonian: Eesti Karikas) was the seventh season of the Estonian football knockout tournament. Winners of the cup qualified for the 1997–98 UEFA Cup Winners' Cup qualifying round. The defending champion, Tallinna Sadam, was successfully defend the title, after winning the final 3–2, which was held at Kadriorg Stadium, Tallinn on 25 June 1997.

All in all, 40 teams took part of the competition.

== First round ==
Team 1	Score	Team 2
Keila	13–0	Kespo Kehtna
Muuga Sadam	1–4	Jägala
Rada/HKL	4–3	Atli
Lasnamäe	7–0	Riigikogu
Veteran Kohtla-Järve	5–1	Tempori
Rakvere	0–4	Fortuna Tapa
Eliit Kohtla-Järve	5–0	Junior Maardu
Põlva Lootos	1–5	Sport Põltsamaa

== Second round ==
Team 1	Score	Team 2
Märjamaa Kompanii	3–6	Keila
Lokomotiiv Valga	4–1	Rada/HKL
Sport Põltsamaa	5–1	Viljandi MSK
M.C. Tallinn	6–0	Kärdla Linnameeskond
Dokker	4–0	Veteran Kohtla-Järve
Micago	1–10	Fortuna Tapa
Lasnamäe	4–1	Merkuur
Eliit Kohtla-Järve	w/o	Jägala

== Third round ==
Team 1	Score	Team 2
Eliit Kohtla-Järve	4–2	Olümpia Maardu
Lokomotiiv Valga	2–0	Norma
M.C. Tallinn	1–2	Pärnu JK
Keila	1–3	Sillamäe Kalev
Dokker	1–0	Tallinna Jalgpallikool
Fortuna Tapa	1–3	FC Lelle
Lasnamäe	2–3	Tulevik
Sport Põltsamaa	0–4	Dünamo

== Fourth round ==
Team 1	Score	Team 2
Dünamo	0–1	Flora
Pärnu JK	0–3	Narva Trans
FC Lelle	1–1 (a.e.t.) (6–5 p)	Eesti Põlevkivi Jõhvi
Sillamäe Kalev	0–1	Tallinna Sadam
Lokomotiiv Valga	1–6	Lelle SK
Eliit Kohtla-Järve	0–2	Vall
Dokker	0–5	Marlekor
Tulevik	1–6	Lantana

== Quarter-finals ==
Team 1	Agg.	Team 2	1st leg	2nd leg
Narva Trans	12–0	FC Lelle	6–0	6–0
Lantana	3–0	Flora	0–0	3–0
Lelle SK	0–1	Tallinna Sadam	0–0	0–1
Vall	1–2	Marlekor	1–1	0–1

== Semi-finals ==
Team 1	Agg.	Team 2	1st leg	2nd leg
Marlekor	0–7	Lantana	0–4	0–3
Narva Trans	3–4	Tallinna Sadam	1–1	2–3

== Final ==
25 June 1997

Tallinna Sadam	3–2	Lantana
Krõm 65', 69' Ustritski 78'	Report	Bragin 53' Gruznov 72'

Kadriorg Stadium, Tallinn
Attendance: 500
Referee: Jüri Saar
