= 1995–96 Estonian Cup =

6th season of the Estonian main domestic football

Eesti Karikas

Tournament details
- Country: Estonia
- Teams: 61

Final positions
- Champions: Tallinna Sadam (1st title)
- Runners-up: Eesti Põlevkivi Jõhvi

Tournament statistics
- Matches played: 57
- Goals scored: 264 (4.63 per match)

The 1995–96 Estonian Cup (Estonian: Eesti Karikas) was the sixth season of the Estonian football knockout tournament. Winners of the cup qualified for the 1996–97 UEFA Cup Winners' Cup qualifying round. The defending champion, Flora was knocked out in the semi-final against later cup winners Tallinna Sadam.

The competition culminated with the final held at Kadriorg Stadium, Tallinn on 21 June 1996 with Tallinna Sadam taking the title 2–0.

All in all, 61 teams took part of the competition.

== Preliminary round ==
Team 1	Score	Team 2
Rada/HKL	w/o	Fortuna Tapa
Avinurme	0–7	Riigikogu
Kehra JK Tempo	7–1	Rakvere
Veteran Kohtla-Järve	w/o	Järvamaa
Tarvastu	3–2	Võhma Olümpia
Mikitamäe	1–3	Põlva Lootos
Elva	0–3	Viljandi MSK
Warrior	w/o	Lelle SS
Risti	w/o	Lihula
Märjamaa Kompanii	4–3	Kärdla Linnameeskond
Virtsu	w/o	Kullamaa
Kaitseliit Rapla	w/o	Lelle SK
Kespo Kehtna	1–15	Muuga Sadam
Keila	9–1	Flora Fännklubi

== First round ==
Team 1	Score	Team 2
Veteran Kohtla-Järve	3–2	Tempo
Fortuna Tapa	3–0	Jägala
Riigikogu	0–7	Baltika Narva
Puma Pärnu	0–2	Lokomotiiv Valga
Tarvastu	4–3	Warrior
Merkuur	3–1	Ajak Tartu
Viljandi MSK	6–5	Põlva Lootos
Sport Põltsamaa	w/o	Risti
Kullamaa	1–6	Märjamaa Kompanii
Haapsalu	2–4	Lelle SK
Atli	1–2	Pärnu United
Olümpia Maardu	4–5	Kopli
Devia	w/o	Kohtla-Järve LSK
Keila	1–2	Muuga Sadam
Kiviõli	w/o	Püsivus
Sillamäe Kalev		Bye

== Second round ==
Team 1	Score	Team 2
Sillamäe Kalev	14–0	Tarvastu
Muuga Sadam	1–4	Fortuna Tapa
Merkuur	3–2 (a.e.t.)	Lelle SK
Pärnu United	0–2	Devia
Kopli	1–3	Kiviõli
Märjamaa Kompanii	9–3	Viljandi MSK
Veteran Kohtla-Järve	3–0	Lokomotiiv Valga
Sport Põltsamaa	1–1 (a.e.t.) (2–3 p)	Baltika Narva

== Third round ==
Team 1	Score	Team 2
Baltika Narva	0–0 (a.e.t.) (9–8 p)	FC Lelle
Devia	1–1 (a.e.t.) (5–4 p)	Norma
Merkuur	2–1	Vall
Märjamaa Kompanii	3–1	DAG Tartu
Fortuna Tapa	0–3	Dünamo
Sillamäe Kalev	3–0	Arsenal Tallinn
Veteran Kohtla-Järve	3–0	Tulevik
Kiviõli	2–1	Tallinna Jalgpallikool

== Fourth round ==
Team 1	Score	Team 2
Baltika Narva	0–4	Eesti Põlevkivi Jõhvi
Devia	0–9	Lantana
Märjamaa Kompanii	0–11	Tallinna Sadam
Merkuur	0–3	Narva Trans
Dünamo	0–2	Tervis Pärnu
Sillamäe Kalev	0–6	Flora
Veteran Kohtla-Järve	2–0	Pärnu JK
Kiviõli	2–8	Tevalte/Marlekor

== Quarter-finals ==
Team 1	Agg.	Team 2	1st leg	2nd leg
Tervis Pärnu	0–2	Tevalte/Marlekor	0–0	0–2
Tallinna Sadam	2–0	Flora	2–0	0–0
Narva Trans	0–3	Lantana	0–2	0–1
Eesti Põlevkivi Jõhvi	6–3	Veteran Kohtla-Järve	3–0	3–3

== Semi-finals ==
Team 1	Agg.	Team 2	1st leg	2nd leg
Lantana	0–1	Tallinna Sadam	0–1	0–0
Tevalte/Marlekor	1–2	Eesti Põlevkivi Jõhvi	1–0	0–2

== Final ==
21 June 1996

Tallinna Sadam	2–0	Eesti Põlevkivi Jõhvi
Terehhov 27'; Krõlov 60'

Kadriorg Stadium, Tallinn
Attendance: 500
Referee: Oleg Timofejev
