= 1993–94 Estonian Cup =

Estonian football competition

Eesti Karikas

Tournament details
- Country: Estonia
- Teams: 21

Final positions
- Champions: Norma
- Runners-up: Narva Trans

Tournament statistics
- Matches played: 22
- Goals scored: 106 (4.82 per match)

The 1993–94 Estonian Cup (Estonian: Eesti Karikas) was the fourth season of the Estonian football knockout tournament. Winners of the cup qualified for the 1994–95 UEFA Cup Winners' Cup qualifying round. The defending champion, Nikol, was knocked out in the quarter-final in a penalty shoot-out against Narva Trans.

The competition culminated with the final held at Kadriorg Stadium, Tallinn on 5 July 1994 with Norma taking the title 4–1.

All in all, 21 teams took part of the competition.

== First round ==
Team 1	Score	Team 2
FC Lelle	3–3 (a.e.t.) (6–5 p)	Olümpia Maardu
Pena Jõhvi	2–1 (a.e.t.)	Kiviõli
Järvamaa	w/o	Viljandi MSK
Tulevik	1–0	Lokomotiv Valga
Raasiku Joker	2–7	Kehra Paber
Fööniks-Sport Valga	1–0	Tartu Autovead

== Second round ==
Team 1	Score	Team 2
Kehra Paber	1–7	Seveni
FC Lelle	1–3	Tallinna Jalgpallikool
JK/Kalev Pärnu	4–1	Viljandi MSK
Fööniks-Sport Valga	0–10	Tulevik
Pena Jõhvi	5–0	N.O.V.A. Jõgeva

== Third round ==
Team 1	Score	Team 2
Eesti Põlevkivi Jõhvi	1–1 (a.e.t.) (1–3 p)	Norma
Tallinna Sadam	3–0	Merkuur
Flora	2–1	Tevalte
JK/Kalev Pärnu	0–1	Tallinna Jalgpallikool
Narva Trans	0–0 (a.e.t.) (5–4 p)	Pena Jõhvi
Seveni	1–4	Dünamo
Nikol	2–0	Sillamäe Kalev
Tulevik	1–4	Tervis Pärnu

== Quarter-finals ==
Team 1	Score	Team 2
Flora	1–0	Tallinna Sadam
Narva Trans	0–0 (a.e.t.) (4–2 p)	Nikol
Tervis Pärnu	0–4	Dünamo
Norma	10–0	Tallinna Jalgpallikool

== Semi-finals ==
Team 1	Agg.	Team 2	1st leg	2nd leg
Norma	1–1 (a)	Flora	0–0	1–1
Dünamo	2–4	Narva Trans	1–4	1–0

== Final ==
5 July 1994

Norma	4–1	Narva Trans
Saks 56', 76'; Tšmil 65'; Vilderson 75'		Toštšev 56'

Kadriorg Stadium, Tallinn
Attendance: 1,000
Referee: Oleg Timofeev
