= Indrek Zelinski =

Estonian footballer (born 1974)

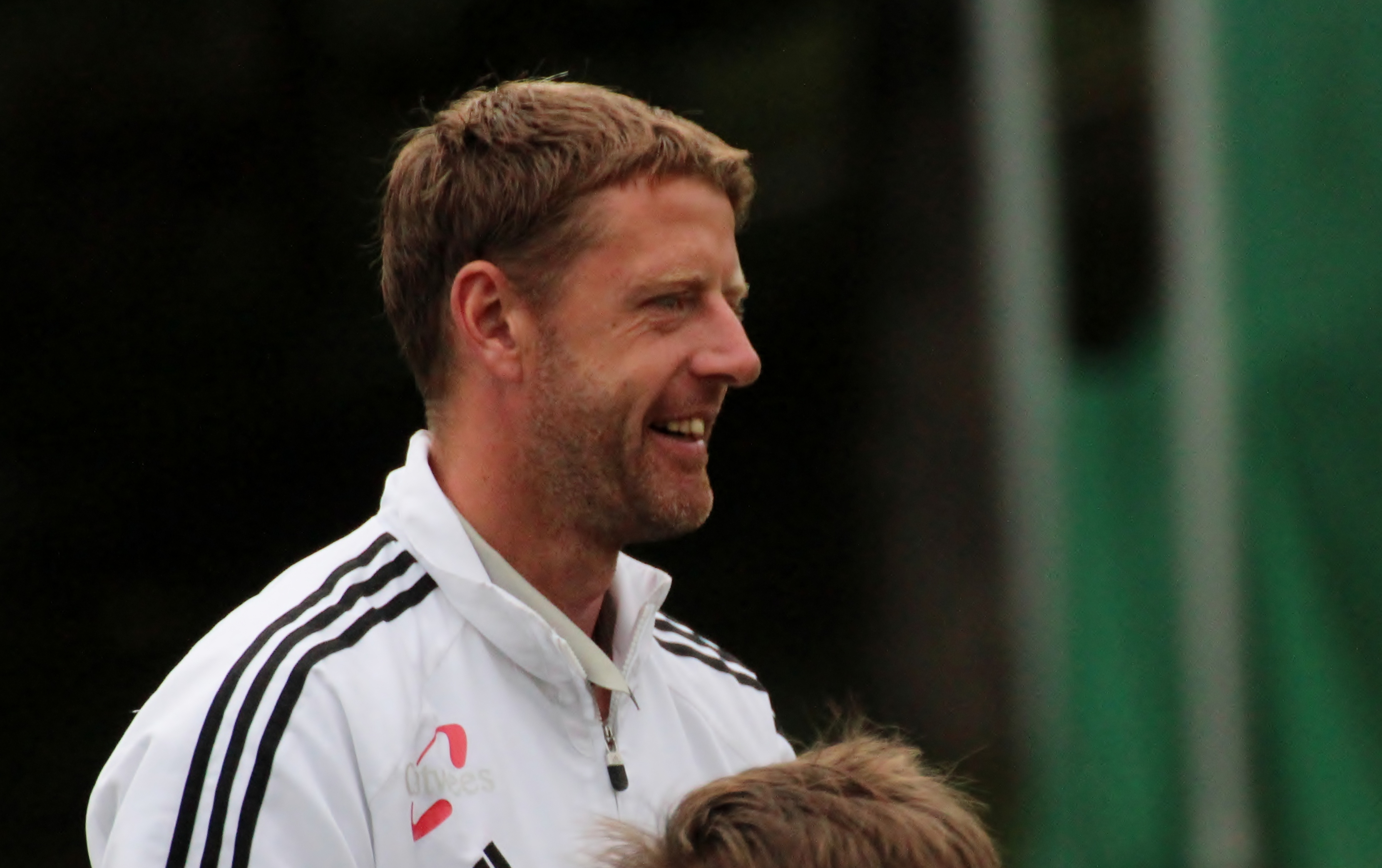
- Zelinski in 2012

Personal information
- Full name: Indrek Zelinski
- Date of birth: 13 November 1974 (age 52)
- Place of birth: Pärnu, then part of Estonian SSR, Soviet Union
- Height: 1.84 m (6 ft 1/2 in)
- Position: Forward

Youth career
- 1985–: Pärnu Kalev

Senior career*
Years	Team	Apps	(Gls)
1991	Sindi Kalju	?	(?)
1992	Pärnu KEK	?	(?)
1992–1993	Pärnu Kalev	?	(?)
1993–2001	Flora	115	(62)
1993–1995	→ Lelle (loan)	?	(?)
1994–1996	→ Tervis Pärnu (loan)	?	(?)
1999	→ Kuressaare (loan)	1	(0)
2000	→ Lahti (loan)	22	(5)
2001–2005	AaB	35	(13)
2003	→ Landskrona BoIS (loan)	13	(1)
2004	→ Frem (loan)	17	(6)
2005–2009	Levadia	151	(84)
2009	Levadia II	3	(7)

International career
1994–1995	Estonia U21	11	(0)
1994–2010	Estonia	103	(27)

Managerial career
- 2011: Levadia III
- 2012–2015: Levadia (assistant)
- 2016: Estonia U18
- 2016: Estonia U23 (assistant)
- 2016–2017: Estonia women
- 2017–2018: Vaprus
- 2019–2020: KTP (assistant)
- 2021: Paide (assistant)
- * Club domestic league appearances and goals

Indrek Zelinski (born 13 November 1974) is an Estonian football coach and former professional player.

Zelinski played as a forward for Sindi Kalju, Tervis Pärnu, Pärnu Kalev, Flora, Lelle, Kuressaare, Lahti, AaB, Landskrona BoIS, Frem and Levadia. Zelinski made his international debut for the Estonia national team in 1994. He made 103 appearances for the team, scoring 27 goals, before retiring in 2010. Zelinski was named Estonian Footballer of the Year in 2001, and won the Estonian Silverball award three times, in 2000, 2003 and 2007.

== Early life ==
Born in Pärnu, Zelinski started playing football in 1985 for his hometown club Pärnu Kalev's youth team under the coach Märt Siigur.

== Club career ==
=== Flora ===
In 1993, Zelinski signed for Flora. He saw limited playing time during the 1993–94 season, but scored a hat-trick in the championship play-off match against Norma, earning his first trophy. Zelinski spent his first seasons in Flora mostly playing for Flora affiliated teams Lelle, Tervis Pärnu and Kuressaare. He became a Flora's first team regular in the 1995–96 season. Zelinski won his second Meistriliiga title with Flora in the 1997–98 season and a third one in the following 1998 season.

On 29 July 1999, Flora reached an agreement with English side Blackpool for the transfer of Zelinski, but the move was foiled by work permit issues.

==== Lahti (loan) ====
On 2 December 1999, Zelinski joined Finnish Veikkausliiga side Lahti on loan. Zelinski returned to Flora after the one-year loan spell in October 2000.

=== AaB ===
On 17 July 2001, Zelinski joined Danish Superliga side AaB on loan until 9 December 2001 for a fee of EEK 1.3 million. The move was made permanent on 4 August 2001 for a fee of EEK 4 million. At Aab, Zelinski formed a strike partnership with fellow Estonian international Andres Oper. Zelinski scored 13 goals in the 2001–02 season and was the team's top goalscorer in the league. Despite that, we was dropped by the new manager Poul Erik Andreasen, and subsequently loaned to Landskrona BoIS and Frem.

=== Levadia ===
In January 2005, Zelinski returned to Estonia as a free agent and signed a two-year contract with Levadia. He was Levadia's top goalscorer in the league for three consecutive seasons from 2005 to 2007, and won four consecutive Meistriliiga titles in 2006, 2007, 2008, and 2009. In August 2009, Zelinski announced that he will almost certainly retire from professional football at the end of the season. He played his last match in the Meistriliiga on 10 November 2009 against Paide Linnameeskond, where he was sent off in the end of the first half for a professional foul.

== International career ==
Zelinski made his international debut for the Estonia national team on 7 May 1994 in a 0–4 away defeat against United States in a friendly. He scored his first goal for Estonia on 13 November 1996 in a 6–1 away win against Andorra. Three days later, on 16 November 1996, Zelinski scored a hat-trick against Indonesia in a friendly. Zelinski was named Estonian Footballer of the Year in 2001, and won the Estonian Silverball award three times, in 2000, 2003 and 2007. He ended his international career with a testimonial match on 21 May 2010, after a 2–0 home win against Finland, having made 103 appearances and scoring 27 goals.

== Personal life ==
Zelinski has a daughter, Johanna-Lisa (born 2000), with his girlfriend Sigrit Järvamägi who is a two-time Estonian Women's Cup winner with Flora women's team.

== Career statistics ==
=== Club ===
Club	Season	League			Cup		League Cup		Europe		Other (Note: Includes the Meistriliiga championship match, Commonwealth Cup, Estonian Supercup, Baltic League and Livonia Cup)		Total	
Club	Season	Division	Apps	Goals	Apps	Goals	Apps	Goals	Apps	Goals	Apps	Goals	Apps	Goals
Sindi Kalju	1991	Regional League					—		—					
Pärnu KEK	1992	Esiliiga					—		—					
Pärnu Kalev	1992–93	II liiga					—		—					
Flora	1993–94	Meistriliiga	10	6			—		—		1	3	11	9
Flora	1994–95	Meistriliiga	3	0			—		1	0	0	0	4	0
Flora	1995–96	Meistriliiga	9	1			—		0	0	3	0	12	1
Flora	1996–97	Meistriliiga	22	5			—		2	0	0	0	24	5
Flora	1997–98	Meistriliiga	21	13	1	1	—		1	0	0	0	23	14
Flora	1998	Meistriliiga	12	10			—		2	1	1	0	15	11
Flora	1999	Meistriliiga	26	14			—		2	0	0	0	28	14
Flora	2001	Meistriliiga	12	13			—		0	0	0	0	12	13
Flora	Total		115	62	1	1	—		8	1	5	3	129	67
Lelle (loan)	1993–94	II liiga					—		—					
Lelle (loan)	1994–95	Esiliiga					—		—					
Lelle (loan)	Total						—		—					
Tervis Pärnu (loan)	1994–95	Esiliiga					—		—					
Tervis Pärnu (loan)	1995–96	Meistriliiga	10	0			—		—		0	0	10	0
Tervis Pärnu (loan)	Total		10	0			—		—		0	0	10	0
Kuressaare (loan)	1999	Esiliiga	1	0			—		—		0	0	1	0
Lahti (loan)	2000	Veikkausliiga	22	5					—		0	0	22	5
AaB	2001–02	Danish Superliga	31	13			—		—				31	13
AaB	2002–03	Danish Superliga	4	0			—		—				4	0
AaB	Total		35	13			—		—				35	13
Landskrona BoIS (loan)	2003	Allsvenskan	13	1			—		—				13	1
Frem (loan)	2003–04	Danish Superliga	9	0			—		—				9	0
Frem (loan)	2004–05	1. Division	8	6			—		—				8	6
Frem (loan)	Total		17	6			—		—				17	6
Levadia	2005	Meistriliiga	29	18			—		1	0	1	0	31	18
Levadia	2006	Meistriliiga	32	21			—		2	1	0	0	34	22
Levadia	2007	Meistriliiga	31	23			—		4	0	8	2	43	25
Levadia	2008	Meistriliiga	33	15			—		2	0	7	0	42	15
Levadia	2009	Meistriliiga	26	7	4	2	—		6	0	4	1	40	10
Levadia	Total		151	84	4	2	—		15	1	20	3	190	90
Levadia II	2009	Esiliiga	3	7	0	0	—		—		—		3	7
Career total			367	178	5	3			23	2	25	6	420	189

=== International ===
National team	Year	Apps	Goals
Estonia
Estonia	1994	3	0
Estonia	1995	3	0
Estonia	1996	10	4
Estonia	1997	14	3
Estonia	1998	13	3
Estonia	1999	12	3
Estonia	2000	11	3
Estonia	2001	12	4
Estonia	2002	10	3
Estonia	2003	11	3
Estonia	2004	1	0
Estonia	2005	1	0
Estonia	2006	0	0
Estonia	2007	1	1
Estonia	2008	0	0
Estonia	2009	0	0
Estonia	2010	1	0
Total		103	27

=== International goals ===
Estonia score listed first, score column indicates score after each Zelinski goal.

International goals by date, venue, cap, opponent, score, result and competition
No.	Date	Venue	Cap	Opponent	Score	Result	Competition
1	13 November 1996	Estadi Comunal, Andorra la Vella, Andorra	15	Andorra	1–0	6–1	Friendly
2	16 November 1996	Stadio Giuseppe Olmo, Celle Ligure, Italy	16	Indonesia	1–0	3–0	Friendly
3	16 November 1996	Stadio Giuseppe Olmo, Celle Ligure, Italy	16	Indonesia	2–0	3–0	Friendly
4	16 November 1996	Stadio Giuseppe Olmo, Celle Ligure, Italy	16	Indonesia	3–0	3–0	Friendly
5	1 March 1997	Antonis Papadopoulos Stadium, Larnaca, Cyprus	19	Azerbaijan	2–0	2–0	Friendly
6	18 May 1997	Kadriorg Stadium, Tallinn, Estonia	21	Latvia	1–0	1–3	1998 FIFA World Cup qualification
7	22 June 1997	Kuressaare linnastaadion, Kuressaare, Estonia	24	Andorra	1–0	4–1	Friendly
8	22 June 1998	Kuressaare linnastaadion, Kuressaare, Estonia	34	Andorra	1–0	2–1	Friendly
9	20 September 1998	Kadriorg Stadium, Tallinn, Estonia	39	Egypt	2–0	2–2	Friendly
10	21 November 1998	Abovyan City Stadium, Abovyan, Armenia	43	Armenia	1–2	1–2	Friendly
11	22 January 1999	Umm al-Fahm Municipal Stadion, Umm al-Fahm, Israel	45	Norway	2–3	3–3	Friendly
12	22 January 1999	Umm al-Fahm Municipal Stadion, Umm al-Fahm, Israel	45	Norway	3–3	3–3	Friendly
13	16 March 1999	GSZ Stadium, Larnaca, Cyprus	48	Cyprus	1–0	2–1	Friendly
14	23 February 2000	Rajamangala National Stadium, Bangkok, Thailand	56	Finland	1–4	2–4	2000 King's Cup
15	10 December 2000	Hong Kong Stadium, Hong Kong	66	Hong Kong	1–1	2–1	Friendly
16	10 December 2000	Hong Kong Stadium, Hong Kong	66	Hong Kong	2–1	2–1	Friendly
17	2 June 2001	A. Le Coq Arena, Tallinn, Estonia	70	Netherlands	2–1	2–4	2002 FIFA World Cup qualification
18	3 July 2001	Skonto Stadium, Riga, Latvia	72	Latvia	1–1	1–3	2001 Baltic Cup
19	15 August 2001	A. Le Coq Arena, Tallinn, Estonia	74	Cyprus	1–1	2–2	2002 FIFA World Cup qualification
20	10 November 2001	Nikos Goumas Stadium, Athens, Greece	77	Greece	2–4	2–4	Friendly
21	14 March 2002	Stadio Enzo Mazotti, Montecatini Terme, Italy	79	Saudi Arabia	1–0	2–0	Friendly
22	21 May 2002	San Marino Stadium, Serravalle, San Marino	82	San Marino	1–0	1–0	Friendly
23	12 October 2002	A. Le Coq Arena, Tallinn, Estonia	86	New Zealand	3–2	3–2	Friendly
24	30 April 2003	Camp d’Esports d’Aixovall, Aixovall, Andorra	93	Andorra	1–0	2–0	UEFA Euro 2004 qualifying
25	30 April 2003	Camp d’Esports d’Aixovall, Aixovall, Andorra	93	Andorra	2–0	2–0	UEFA Euro 2004 qualifying
26	20 December 2003	Sultan Qaboos Stadium, Muscat, Oman	99	Oman	1–1	1–3	Friendly
27	22 August 2007	A. Le Coq Arena, Tallinn, Estonia	102	Andorra	2–1	2–1	UEFA Euro 2008 qualifying

== Honours ==
=== Club ===
Flora

- Meistriliiga: 1993–94, 1997–98, 1998
- Estonian Cup: 1997–98
- Estonian Supercup: 1998

Levadia

- Meistriliiga: 2006, 2007, 2008, 2009
- Estonian Cup: 2004–05, 2006–07

=== Individual ===
- Estonian Footballer of the Year: 2001
- Estonian Silverball: 2000, 2003, 2007
- UEFA awards 100 caps: 2011

== See also ==
- List of men's footballers with 100 or more international caps
