= 1994–95 Esiliiga =

Estonian football league season for second division

Esiliiga
- Season: 1994–95

The 1994–95 Esiliiga was divided into two zones, both containing six teams. They all played two games, one at home and another on the road, against each other in their zone to decide the top two, who would join with the bottom two from Premier Division first phase to create a Premier Division promotion tournament. Other four teams from both zones made up Esiliiga promotion/relegation tournament with four new teams from Second Division first phase. Winners of both groups secured a place in 1995–96 Esiliiga season. Second placed teams in the tournament played each other in the final play-off game to decide who joins the latter two and who is relegated along with other teams that participated in the promotion/relegation phase.

All in all, JK Tulevik Viljandi and JK Vall Tallinn survived the relegation phase and retained their position in the league. FC Arsenal Tallinn was the only team to rise up from the Second Division to play in Esiliiga the next year for the first time. JK Dünamo Tallinn, Tallinna Jalgpallikool and FC Lelle returned to the division, as they all failed to qualify to Meistriliiga. JK Tervis Pärnu was the only successful team to be promoted.

== Preliminary round ==
=== Northern Zone ===
Pos	Team	Pld	W	D	L	GF	GA	GD	Pts	Qualification
1	Dünamo	10	7	0	3	32	21	+11	21	Qualification for promotion tournament
2	Jalgpallikool	10	6	1	3	26	15	+11	19	Qualification for promotion tournament
3	Pena	10	5	0	5	17	22	−5	15	Qualification for relegation tournament
4	Kiviõli	10	4	1	5	17	22	−5	13	Qualification for relegation tournament
5	Kreenholm	10	3	2	5	21	23	−2	11	Qualification for relegation tournament
6	Vall	10	2	2	6	14	24	−10	8	Qualification for relegation tournament

Source: RSSSF
Rules for classification: 1) points; 2) head-to-head points; 3) head-to-head goal difference; 4) head-to-head goals scored; 5) goal difference; 6) number of goals scored.

=== Southern Zone ===
Pos	Team	Pld	W	D	L	GF	GA	GD	Pts	Qualification
1	Lelle	10	9	1	0	20	3	+17	28	Qualification for promotion tournament
2	Tervis	10	6	1	3	18	4	+14	19	Qualification for promotion tournament
3	Tulevik	10	6	1	3	27	10	+17	19	Qualification for relegation tournament
4	Merkuur	10	5	1	4	9	16	−7	16	Qualification for relegation tournament
5	Põltsamaa	10	1	0	9	6	27	−21	3	Qualification for relegation tournament
6	Lokomotiiv	10	1	0	9	7	27	−20	3	Qualification for relegation tournament

Source: RSSSF
Rules for classification: 1) points; 2) head-to-head points; 3) head-to-head goal difference; 4) head-to-head goals scored; 5) goal difference; 6) number of goals scored.

== First Division Promotion/relegation Tournament ==
=== Northern Zone ===
Pos	Team	Pld	W	D	L	GF	GA	GD	Pts	Promotion or relegation
1	Arsenal Tallinn (P)	8	4	1	3	10	10	0	13	Promotion to Esiliiga
2	Vall (P)	8	4	1	3	13	13	0	13	Qualification for promotion play-offs
3	Sillamäe Kalev (R)	8	4	1	3	13	11	+2	13	Relegation to Second Division
4	Kiviõli (R)	8	3	2	3	13	10	+3	11	Relegation to Second Division
5	Kreenholm (R)	8	1	3	4	8	13	−5	6	Relegation to Second Division
–	Pena	0	0	0	0	0	0	0	0	Withdrew

Source: RSSSF
Rules for classification: 1) points; 2) head-to-head points; 3) head-to-head goal difference; 4) head-to-head goals scored; 5) goal difference; 6) number of goals scored.
(P) Promoted; (R) Relegated

=== Southern Zone ===
Pos	Team	Pld	W	D	L	GF	GA	GD	Pts	Promotion or relegation
1	Tulevik (P)	10	9	1	0	33	8	+25	28	Promotion to Esiliiga
2	Merkuur (R)	10	7	2	1	22	8	+14	23	Qualification for promotion play-offs
3	Lokomotiiv (R)	10	5	0	5	10	19	−9	15	Relegation to Second Division
4	Põltsamaa (R)	10	2	1	7	13	28	−15	7	Relegation to Second Division
–	Lelle (R)	10	1	2	7	9	18	−9	5	Disqualified
–	Järvamaa (R)	10	1	2	7	17	23	−6	5	Disqualified

Source: RSSSF
Rules for classification: 1) points; 2) head-to-head points; 3) head-to-head goal difference; 4) head-to-head goals scored; 5) goal difference; 6) number of goals scored.
(P) Promoted; (R) Relegated

== Promotion play-off ==
Vall	3 – 0	Merkuur
Goal

== See also ==
- 1994–95 Meistriliiga
- 1994 in Estonian football
- 1995 in Estonian football
