= 1991 Estonian SSR Football Championship =

Football Championship

Estonian SSR Higher League
- Season: 1991
- Champions: TVMK; 2nd Title
- Top goalscorer: Andrei Krõlov (21); Vigri

The 1991 Estonian Football Championship was the last domestic top competition before Estonia regained independence from the Soviet Union in August 1991. Thirteen teams competed in this edition, with FC TVMK Tallinn winning the title. Although the league ended when Estonia was an independent state, Estonian Football Association decided not to count it as an official Estonian championship season.

== League table ==
Pos	Team	Pld	W	D	L	GF	GA	GD	Pts
1	TVMK (C)	24	18	3	3	73	17	+56	39
2	Norma	24	17	3	4	73	16	+57	37
3	Eesti Põlevkivi Jõhvi	24	16	5	3	63	24	+39	37
4	Eesti Fosforiit	24	17	3	4	77	25	+52	37
5	Vigri/Marat	24	14	3	7	63	41	+22	31
6	Kalakombinaat/MEK	24	10	7	7	30	28	+2	27
7	Kohtla-Järve Keemik	24	7	6	11	41	51	−10	20
8	Narva Autobaas	24	7	6	11	26	49	−23	20
9	Viljandi	24	8	2	14	30	45	−15	18
10	Narva Baltika	24	4	7	13	24	64	−40	15
11	Tempo	24	4	6	14	27	70	−43	14
12	Sillamäe Kalev	24	4	4	16	37	73	−36	12
13	Dvigatel	24	2	1	21	16	77	−61	5

(C) Champions

== See also ==
- 1991 in Estonian football
