= 1995–96 Meistriliiga =

Estonian national championships in football

Meistriliiga
- Season: 1995–96
- Champions: Lantana (1st title)
- Relegated: PJK Kalev
- UEFA Cup: Lantana; Flora
- Cup Winners' Cup: Tallinna Sadam
- Intertoto Cup: Narva Trans
- Top goalscorer: Lembit Rajala (16)

The 1995–96 Meistriliiga was the fifth season of the Meistriliiga, Estonia's premier football league. Lantana won their first title.

== Preliminary round ==
=== League table ===
Pos	Team	Pld	W	D	L	GF	GA	GD	Pts	Qualification
1	Lantana	14	10	3	1	37	8	+29	33	Qualification for Championship Tournament
2	Narva Trans	14	6	4	4	22	16	+6	22	Qualification for Championship Tournament
3	Flora	14	6	4	4	37	19	+18	22	Qualification for Championship Tournament
4	Tallinna Sadam	14	6	3	5	23	16	+7	21	Qualification for Championship Tournament
5	Tevalte-Marlekor	14	6	2	6	20	19	+1	20	Qualification for Championship Tournament
6	Tervis	14	5	2	7	25	29	−4	17	Qualification for Championship Tournament
7	Eesti Põlevkivi Jõhvi	14	3	8	3	13	17	−4	17	Qualification for Meistriliiga Transition Tournament
8	PJK Kalev	14	0	2	12	8	61	−53	2	Qualification for Meistriliiga Transition Tournament

=== Results ===
Home \ Away	JEP	FLO	PJK	LAN	SAD	TER	MAR	TRS
Eesti Põlevkivi Jõhvi		2–1	1–1	1–1	1–3	0–0	2–0	0–0
Flora	2–2		5–0	1–5	3–0	7–0	2–1	0–1
PJK Kalev	1–1	0–5		0–1	0–4	1–5	1–4	2–4
Lantana	4–1	1–1	10–0		2–1	2–0	-:+	1–0
Tallinna Sadam	0–0	2–2	7–1	0–2		0–1	1–0	1–0
Tervis	0–2	2–6	5–0	2–4	1–2		3–1	2–2
Tevalte-Marlekor	0–0	2–1	5–1	0–3	1–1	2–1		4–2
Narva Trans	4–0	1–1	4–0	1–1	0–1	0–3	1–0	

Legend: Blue = home team win; Yellow = draw; Red = away team win.

== Championship Tournament ==
The points obtained during the preliminary round were carried over halved and rounded up.

=== League table ===
Pos	Team	Pld	W	D	L	GF	GA	GD	BP	Pts	Qualification
1	Lantana (C)	10	6	2	2	21	7	+14	17	37	Qualification for UEFA Cup preliminary round
2	Flora	10	6	2	2	14	3	+11	11	31	Qualification for UEFA Cup preliminary round
3	Tevalte-Marlekor	10	7	0	3	13	10	+3	10	31	
4	Tallinna Sadam	10	4	1	5	17	19	−2	11	24	Qualification for Cup Winners' Cup qualifying round
5	Narva Trans	10	2	2	6	11	16	−5	11	19	Qualification for Intertoto Cup group stage
6	Tervis	10	1	1	8	7	28	−21	9	13	

(C) Champions

=== Results ===
Home \ Away	FLO	LAN	SAD	TER	MAR	TRS
Flora		0–0	1–0	2–0	0–1	0–1
Lantana	0–1		3–4	3–0	3–0	4–2
Tallinna Sadam	0–0	0–3		2–5	1–3	3–2
Tervis	1–5	0–3	0–5		-:+	0–5
Tevalte-Marlekor	0–4	2–0	2–0	2–0		2–0
Narva Trans	0–1	0–0	0–2	1–1	0–3	

Legend: Blue = home team win; Yellow = draw; Red = away team win.

== Meistriliiga Transition Tournament ==
Eesti Põlevkivi Jõhvi and PJK Kalev, the teams finishing in the last two positions in the preliminary round, faced four best teams of the 1995-96 Esiliiga in the play-off for two places in the 1996-97 Meistriliiga.

Pos	Team	Pld	W	D	L	GF	GA	GD	Pts	Promotion or relegation
1	Eesti Põlevkivi Jõhvi	10	7	0	3	23	7	+16	21	Promotion to Meistriliiga
2	Vall (P)	10	7	0	3	18	9	+9	21	Promotion to Meistriliiga
3	Norma	10	5	2	3	13	11	+2	17	Relegation to Esiliiga
4	PJK Kalev (R)	10	4	2	4	12	20	−8	14	Relegation to Esiliiga
5	Dünamo	10	2	2	6	8	14	−6	8	Relegation to Esiliiga
6	TJK	10	1	2	7	9	22	−13	5	Relegation to Esiliiga

(P) Promoted; (R) Relegated

== Top scorers ==
Rank	Player	Club	Goals
1	(Estonia) Lembit Rajala	Flora	16
2	(Estonia) Maksim Gruznov	Lantana	12
3	(Estonia) Andrei Borissov	Lantana	8
3	(Estonia) Boriss Nejolov	Narva Trans	8
3	(Estonia) Ivan O'Konnel-Bronin	Tervis Pärnu/Flora	8
3	(Estonia) Aleksandr Olerski	Tevalte/Marlekor	8
3	(Estonia) Dmitri Ustritski	Tallinna Sadam	8

== See also ==
- 1995 in Estonian football
- 1996 in Estonian football
