= 2000–01 Estonian Cup =

Estonian football competition

Eesti Karikas

Tournament details
- Country: Estonia
- Teams: 18

Final positions
- Champions: Narva Trans
- Runners-up: Flora

Tournament statistics
- Matches played: 22
- Goals scored: 98 (4.45 per match)

The 2000–01 Estonian Cup (Estonian: Eesti Karikas) was the 11th season of the Estonian football knockout tournament. Winners of the cup qualified for the 2001–02 UEFA Cup qualifying round. The defending champion, Levadia Maardu, was knocked out in the semi-final against Flora.

The competition culminated with the final held at Valga linnastaadion, Valga on 24 May 2001 with Narva Trans taking the title 1–0 after extra-time.

All in all, 18 teams took part of the competition.

== First round ==
Team 1	Score	Team 2
Toompea	0–9	Tervis Pärnu
Sillamäe Kalev	2–1	Lelle
Concordia Tallinn	0–8	FC Maardu
Sillamäe Kalev-Junior	w/o	Viljandi
Raasiku	1–5	Muhumaa

== Second round ==
Team 1	Score	Team 2
FC Maardu^{1}	1–0	TVMK
Tervis Pärnu	3–4	Kuressaare
Viljandi^{2}	2–2	Valga
Sillamäe Kalev	0–1	Lootus
Muhumaa	0–10	Narva Trans

Notes

- ^{1} FC Maardu were renamed to Levadia Tallinn during the winter break.
- ^{2} Viljandi were renamed to Elva during the winter break.

== Quarter-finals ==
The first legs were played on 11 April 2001, and the second legs on 21 and 22 April 2001.

Team 1	Agg.	Team 2	1st leg	2nd leg
Narva Trans	7–3	Kuressaare	4–1	3–2
Elva	0–11	Flora	0–4	0–7
Lootus	4–2	Tulevik	1–1	3–1
Levadia Tallinn	2–8	Levadia Maardu	2–3	0–5

== Semi-finals ==
The first legs were played on 2 May 2001, and the second legs on 16 May 2001.

Team 1	Agg.	Team 2	1st leg	2nd leg
Lootus	2–3	Narva Trans	1–1	1–2
Levadia Maardu	1–4	Flora	0–2	1–2

== Final ==
24 May 2001	Narva Trans	1–0 (a.e.t.)	Flora	Valga
	Kurotskin 111'			Stadium: Valga linnastaadion Attendance: 400; Referee: Hannes Kaasik
