= FC Nordsjælland in European football =

European football record of FC Nordsjælland

- Club: FC Nordsjælland
- First entry: 2003–04 UEFA Cup
- Latest entry: 2026–27 UEFA Conference League

This is the list of all FC Nordsjælland's European matches.

== Results ==
Season	Competition	Round	Opponent	Home	Away	Agg.
2003–04	UEFA Cup	Qualifying round	(Armenia) Shirak	4–0	2–0	6–0
2003–04	UEFA Cup	First round	(Greece) Panionios	0–1	1–2	1–3
2008–09	UEFA Cup	First qualifying round	(Estonia) TVMK	5–0	3–0	8–0
2008–09	UEFA Cup	Second qualifying round	(Scotland) Queen of the South	2–1	2–1	4–2
2008–09	UEFA Cup	First round	(Greece) Olympiacos	0–2	0–5	0–7
2010–11	UEFA Europa League	Third qualifying round	(Portugal) Sporting CP	0–1	1–2	1–3
2011–12	UEFA Europa League	Play-off round	(Portugal) Sporting CP	0–0	1–2	1–2
2012–13	UEFA Champions League	Group E	(England) Chelsea	0–4	1–6	4th
2012–13	UEFA Champions League	Group E	(Italy) Juventus	1–1	0–4	4th
2012–13	UEFA Champions League	Group E	(Ukraine) Shakhtar Donetsk	2–5	0–2	4th
2013–14	UEFA Champions League	Third qualifying round	(Russia) Zenit St. Petersburg	0–1	0–5	0–6
2013–14	UEFA Europa League	Play-off round	(Sweden) Elfsborg	0–1	1–1	1–2
2018–19	UEFA Europa League	First qualifying round	(Northern Ireland) Cliftonville	2–1	1−0	3–1
2018–19	UEFA Europa League	Second qualifying round	(Sweden) AIK	1−0	1−0	2–0
2018–19	UEFA Europa League	Third qualifying round	(Serbia) Partizan	1–2	2–3	3–5
2023–24	UEFA Europa Conference League	Third qualifying round	(Romania) FCSB	2–0	0–0	2–0
2023–24	UEFA Europa Conference League	Play-off round	(Serbia) Partizan	5–0	1–0	6–0
2023–24	UEFA Europa Conference League	Group H	(Turkey) Fenerbahçe	6–1	1–3	3rd
2023–24	UEFA Europa Conference League	Group H	(Bulgaria) Ludogorets Razgrad	7–1	0–1	3rd
2023–24	UEFA Europa Conference League	Group H	(Slovakia) Spartak Trnava	1–1	2–0	3rd
2026–27	UEFA Conference League	Second qualifying round	(Sweden) GAIS	0–1	6–0	6–1
2026–27	UEFA Conference League	Third qualifying round	(Iceland) Valur	5–0	2–0	7–0
2026–27	UEFA Conference League	Play-off round	(Switzerland) St. Gallen	1–0	3–2	4–2
2026–27	UEFA Conference League	League phase	(France) AS Monaco			
2026–27	UEFA Conference League	League phase	(Greece) Panathinaikos			
2026–27	UEFA Conference League	League phase	(Finland) KuPS			
2026–27	UEFA Conference League	League phase	(Scotland) Heart of Midlothian	—N/a	1–1	
2026–27	UEFA Conference League	League phase	(Croatia) Hajduk Split			
2026–27	UEFA Conference League	League phase	(Bulgaria) CSKA Sofia	2–2	—N/a	

== Summary ==
=== By competition ===
Competition	Pld	W	D	L	GF	GA	GD	Last season played
European Cup; UEFA Champions League	8	0	1	7	3	31	–28	2013–14
UEFA Cup; UEFA Europa League	22	10	2	10	30	44	–14	2018–19
UEFA Europa Conference League	18	11	4	3	45	13	+32	2026–27
Total	48	21	7	20	78	88	–10	

Source: UEFA.com, Last updated on 2 November 2026
Pld = Matches played; W = Matches won; D = Matches drawn; L = Matches lost; GF = Goals for; GA = Goals against; GD = Goal Difference. Defunct competitions indicated in italics.

== UEFA club coefficient ranking ==
=== Current ===
As of 26 July 2023, Source:

Rank	Team	Points
239	(Norway) Haugesund	2.000
240	(Denmark) AGF	3.000
241	(Denmark) FC Nordsjælland	0.000
242	(Denmark) Silkeborg	4.000
243	(Denmark) Viborg	2.500

=== Rankings since 2006 ===
Season	Ranking	Movement	Points	Change
2006–07	216	▲ +15	6.129	▲ +0.536
2007–08	205	▲ +11	6.748	▲ +0.619
2008–09	199	▲ +6	4.890	▼ -1.858
2009–10	201	▼ -2	5.470	▲ +0.580
2010–11	182	▲ +19	7.110	▲ +1.640
2011–12	172	▲ +10	8.005	▲ +0.895
2012–13	136	▲ +36	12.640	▲ +4.635
2013–14	136	+0	13.260	▲ +0.620
2014–15	141	▼ -5	12.960	▼ -0.300
2015–16	145	▼ -4	11.720	▼ -1.240
2016–17	144	▲ +1	11.300	▼ -0.420
2017–18	200	▼ -56	5.190	▼ -6.110
