= Keskstaadion =

Keskstaadion may refer to:

- Kalevi Keskstaadion, a multi-purpose stadium in Tallinn, Estonia
- Valga Keskstaadion, a multi-purpose stadium in Valga, Estonia
