= Tomas Ražanauskas =

Lithuanian footballer and coach

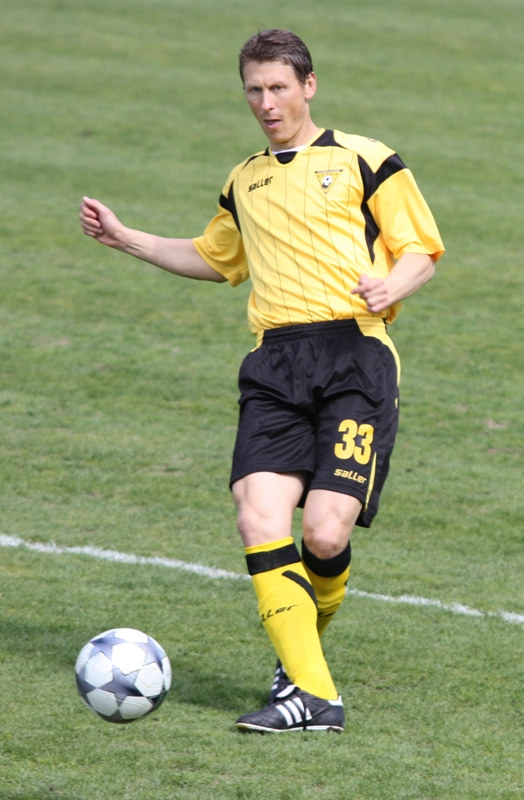

Personal information
- Date of birth: 7 January 1976 (age 50)
- Place of birth: Vilnius, Lithuanian SSR, Soviet Union
- Height: 1.80 m (5 ft 11 in)
- Position: Midfielder

Team information
- Current team: Lithuania (assistant manager)

Senior career*
Years	Team	Apps	(Gls)
1992–1995	FK Panerys Vilnius	52	(19)
1995–1996	FK Žalgiris	27	(15)
1997	Torpedo Moscow	12	(4)
1997	KAMAZ Naberezhnye Chelny	5	(0)
1997–1999	FC Flora	24	(9)
1998–1999	→ Servette FC (loan)	12	(0)
1999	Malmö FF	9	(0)
2000–2001	SK Brann	21	(2)
2001–2004	Akratitos F.C.	44	(3)
2004	Trelleborgs FF	7	(0)
2004–2005	Anorthosis Famagusta	6	(0)
2005	Pors Grenland	10	(0)
2006	FC Vilnius	22	(2)
2006–2007	FC Inter Baku	20	(3)
2008	Žalgiris Vilnius	5	(0)
2009–2010	FK Vėtra	22	(1)
2010–2011	Tauras Tauragė	14	(4)
2011	Sūduva Marijampolė	16	(2)
2012	REO Vilnius	21	(3)
Total		349	(67)

International career
1995–2011	Lithuania	41	(7)

Managerial career
- 2013: Daugava Rīga (assistant)
- 2014: Klaipėdos Granitas (assistant)
- 2015: FC Šiauliai
- 2017: FC Luch Vladivostok (assistant)
- 2017: Spartaks Jūrmala (assistant)
- 2018: Spartaks Jūrmala
- 2019: Torpedo Zhodino (assistant)
- 2020–2021: Vilniaus Vytis (assistant)
- 2021: DFK Dainava
- 2021: Lithuania U19
- 2021–: Lithuania (assistant)
- * Club domestic league appearances and goals

Tomas Ražanauskas (born 7 January 1976) is a Lithuanian professional football coach and a former player. He is an assistant coach with the Lithuania national team.

He played in the position of midfielder and was also a member of the Lithuania national football team.

Before the start of the 2013 Latvian Higher League season Ražanauskas was appointed by Daugava Rīga as the assistant manager, helping Virginijus Liubšys. Before the start of the 2014 season Ražanauskas returned to Lithuania and became an assistant managers of Robertas Poškus at FC Klaipėdos granitas team.

In 2015 he graduated from Lithuanian Sports University. In 2016 he received a UEFA Pro Licence.

== Career statistics ==
=== International ===
Appearances and goals by national team and year
National team	Year	Apps	Goals
Lithuania	1995	1	0
Lithuania	1996	6	1
Lithuania	1997	2	1
Lithuania	1998	4	1
Lithuania	1999	4	0
Lithuania	2001	8	1
Lithuania	2002	4	1
Lithuania	2003	5	2
Lithuania	2004	4	0
Lithuania	2009	2	0
Lithuania	2011	1	0
Total		41	7

Scores and results list Lithuania's goal tally first, score column indicates score after each Ražanauskas goal.

List of international goals scored by Tomas Ražanauskas
No.	Date	Venue	Opponent	Score	Result	Competition	Ref.
1	8 July 1996	Narva Kreenholm Stadium, Narva, Estonia	Latvia	1–0	2–1	1996 Baltic Cup	
2	30 April 1997	Sportpark Eschen-Mauren, Eschen, Liechtenstein	Liechtenstein	2–0	2–0	1998 FIFA World Cup qualification	
3	26 June 1998	Viljandi linnastaadion, Viljandi, Estonia	Azerbaijan	1–0	1–2	Friendly	
4	24 March 2001	Ferenc Puskás Stadium, Budapest, Hungary	Hungary	1–1	1–1	2002 FIFA World Cup qualification	
5	12 October 2002	Darius and Girėnas Stadium, Kaunas, Lithuania	Faroe Islands	1–0	2–0	UEFA Euro 2004 qualifying	
6	29 March 2003	Frankenstadion, Nuremberg, Germany	Germany	–	1–1	UEFA Euro 2004 qualifying	
7	2 April 2003	Darius and Girėnas Stadium, Kaunas, Lithuania	Scotland	1–0	1–0	UEFA Euro 2004 qualifying	

== Honours ==
- Baltic Cup
  - 1996
