= 2003 Baltic Cup =

International football competition

Tournament details
- Host country: Estonia
- Dates: 3 July – 5 July
- Teams: 3
- Venue(s): 2 (in 2 host cities)

Final positions
- Champions: Latvia (8th title)
- Runners-up: Lithuania
- Third place: Estonia

Tournament statistics
- Matches played: 3
- Goals scored: 9 (3 per match)
- Attendance: 3,000 (1,000 per match)
- Top scorer(s): Nine players (1 goal each)

The 2003 Baltic Cup football competition took place from 3 to 5 July 2003 at two venues in Estonia. It was the tenth competition of the three Baltic states – Latvia, Lithuania and Estonia – since they regained their independence from the Soviet Union in 1991.

== Results ==
=== Estonia vs Lithuania ===
3 July 2003

Estonia	1–5	Lithuania
Sirel 57'		Morinas 39'; D. Česnauskis 45'; Velička 72'; Bezykornovas 84'; E. Česnauskis 90'

Valga Linnastaadion, Valga
Attendance: 1,500
Referee: Martin Ingvarsson (Sweden)

=== Lithuania vs Latvia ===
4 July 2003

Lithuania	1–2	Latvia
Tamošauskas 73'		Laizāns 28'; Rubins 32'

Valga Linnastaadion, Valga
Attendance: 500
Referee: Peter Fröjdfeldt (Sweden)

=== Estonia vs Latvia ===
5 July 2003

Estonia	0–0	Latvia

A. Le Coq Arena, Tallinn
Attendance: 1,000
Referee: Martin Ingvarsson (Sweden)

== Final table ==
Team	Pld	W	D	L	GF	GA	GD	Pts
Latvia	2	1	1	0	2	1	+1	4
Lithuania	2	1	0	1	6	3	+3	3
Estonia	2	0	1	1	1	5	−4	1

== Winner ==
2003 Baltic Football Cup winners

Latvia
Ninth title

== Statistics ==
=== Goalscorers ===
There were 9 goals scored in 3 matches, for an average of 3 goals per match.

1 goal

- (Estonia) Jaanus Sirel
- (Latvia) Juris Laizāns
- (Latvia) Andrejs Rubins
- (Lithuania) Tomas Tamošauskas
- (Lithuania) Igoris Morinas
- (Lithuania) Deividas Česnauskis
- (Lithuania) Andrius Velička
- (Lithuania) Marius Bezykornovas
- (Lithuania) Edgaras Česnauskis
