= Marius Bezykornovas =

Lithuanian footballer (born 1976)

Personal information
- Date of birth: 22 August 1976 (age 50)
- Place of birth: Kybartai, Lithuanian SSR, Soviet Union
- Height: 1.75 m (5 ft 9 in)
- Position: Midfielder

Senior career*
Years	Team	Apps	(Gls)
1994–2004	FBK Kaunas	242	(64)
2004	FK Žalgiris Vilnius	14	(3)
2005	FK Atlantas	8	(4)
2006	FK Nevėžis	31	(3)
2007	FK Šilutė	33	(8)
2008	SK Blāzma	16	(0)
2008	FK Tauras Tauragė	16	(10)
2009	LKKA ir Teledema Kaunas	26	(7)
2010–2011	JK Narva Trans	65	(26)
2012–	Lietava Jonava		

International career^{‡}
1994	Lithuania U18	2	(1)
1997	Lithuania U21	1	(0)
1997–2003	Lithuania	7	(2)
- * Club domestic league appearances and goals as of 10 April 2011 ‡ National team caps and goals as of 9 June 2010

Marius Bezykornovas (born 22 August 1976) is a Lithuanian footballer.

== Club career ==
=== JK Narva Trans ===
In 2010, he joined Meistriliiga side JK Narva Trans and played his first match for the team on 9 March 2010.

== International career ==
He made the national team debut on 14 February 1997 in a Friendly tournament against Poland.

== Career statistics ==
=== International ===
Appearances and goals by national team and year
National team	Year	Apps	Goals
Lithuania	1997	3	0
Lithuania	1998	1	1
Lithuania	1999	–	
Lithuania	2000	–	
Lithuania	2001	–	
Lithuania	2002	–	
Lithuania	2003	3	1
Total		7	2

Scores and results list Lithuania's goal tally first, score column indicates score after each Bezykornovas goal.

List of international goals scored by Marius Bezykornovas
No.	Date	Venue	Opponent	Score	Result	Competition
1	16 August 1998	Darius and Girėnas Stadium, Kaunas, Lithuania	Moldova	1–0	1–1	Friendly
2	3 July 2003	Valga Keskstaadion, Valga, Estonia	Estonia	4–1	5–1	2003 Baltic Cup
