= 2002–03 Estonian Cup =

Eesti Karikas

Tournament details
- Country: Estonia
- Teams: 24

Final positions
- Champions: TVMK
- Runners-up: Flora

Tournament statistics
- Matches played: 29
- Goals scored: 138 (4.76 per match)

The 2002–03 Estonian Cup (Estonian: Eesti Karikas) was the 13th season of the Estonian football knockout tournament. Winners of the cup qualified for the 2003–04 UEFA Cup qualifying round. The defending champion, Levadia Tallinn, was knocked out in the semi-final in a penalty shoot-out against Flora.

The competition culminated with the final held at Kadriorg Stadium, Tallinn on 27 May 2003 with TMVK taking the title after the penalty shoot-out 4–1 after the game was finished after extra-time 2–2.

All in all, 24 teams took part of the competition.

== First round ==
| Team 1 | Score | Team 2 |
12 October
| Toompea | 0–3 | Tartu JK Merkuur |
| Lelle | 0–10 | Kuressaare |
| Sörve | 7–3 | Hansa United |
13 October
| Lelle | 1–2 | Sillamäe Kalev |
| Junior Maardu | 1–5 | Elva |
| F.C.A. Estel | 1–0 | Maardu |
23 October
| HÜJK | 0–5 | Valga |
| Tervis Pärnu | 3–2 | TJK |

== Second round ==
| Team 1 | Score | Team 2 |
9 November
| Merkuur | 1–7 | TVMK |
| Tervis Pärnu | 0–7 | Narva Trans |
| Valga | 2–0 (a.e.t.) | Levadia Pärnu |
| Elva | 1–2 | Levadia Maardu |
| Sillamäe Kalev | 0–6 | Tulevik |
| Kuressaare | 3–4 | Lootus |
| F.C.A. Estel | 0–3 | Flora |
10 November
| Sörve | 1–4 | Levadia Tallinn |

== Quarter-finals ==
The first legs were played on 23 and 24 March 2003, and the second legs on 10 and 11 April 2003.

| Team 1 | Agg. | Team 2 | 1st leg | 2nd leg |
|---|---|---|---|---|
| Flora | 10–1 | FC Valga | 5–1 | 5–0 |
| Lootus | 0–15 | TVMK | 0–7 | 0–8 |
| Narva Trans | 3–2 | Tulevik | 0–2 | 3–0 |
| Levadia Tallinn | 4–2 | Levadia Maardu | 3–2 | 1–0 |

== Semi-finals ==
The first legs were played on 8 and 9 May 2003, and the second legs on 18 May 2003.

| Team 1 | Agg. | Team 2 | 1st leg | 2nd leg |
|---|---|---|---|---|
| TVMK | 4–3 | Narva Trans | 2–2 | 2–1 |
| Flora | 3–3 (a.e.t.) (5–4 p) | Levadia Tallinn | 2–1 | 1–2 |

== Final ==
| 27 May 2003 | TVMK | 2–2 (a.e.t.) (4–1 p) | Flora | Tallinn |
| | Smirnov 33'; Krõlov 78' | | Stepanov 37'; Sirevičius 70' | Stadium: Kadrioru staadion Attendance: 1,200; Referee: Margus Kotter |
| | Penalties |
| | Kurjanov (penalty scored); Kisseljov (penalty scored); Kostin (penalty scored); Krõlov (penalty scored) | | (penalty missed) Zahovaiko; (penalty scored) Reim; (penalty missed) Kulik |
