= Vyacheslav Bulavin =

Russian footballer and coach

Personal information
- Full name: Vyacheslav Ivanovich Bulavin
- Date of birth: 18 April 1946 (age 80)
- Place of birth: Kazan, Russian SFSR
- Height: 1.80 m (5 ft 11 in)
- Position: Defender

Youth career
- Iskra Kazan

Senior career*
Years	Team	Apps	(Gls)
1965	FC Rubin Kazan		
1965–1966	FC Stroitel Bugulma	22	(0)
1967	FC Rubin Kazan	27	(0)
1967–1978	FC Zenit Leningrad	226	(10)

Managerial career
- 1978–1985: FC Zenit Leningrad (academy)
- 1985–1987: FC Zenit Leningrad (assistant)
- 1988–1989: FC Zenit Leningrad (academy)
- 1990: FC Zenit Leningrad
- 1999–2000: FC Lokomotiv Saint Petersburg (assistant)
- 2001: FC Zenit-2 Saint Petersburg (assistant)
- 2002: FC Zenit-2 Saint Petersburg (team director)
- 2005–2006: FC TVMK
- 2007: FC TVMK (consultant)
- * Club domestic league appearances and goals

Vyacheslav Ivanovich Bulavin (Russian: Вячеслав Иванович Булавин; born 18 April 1946 in Kazan) is a Russian football coach and a former player.
