= Andrei Borissov =

Estonian footballer (born 1969)

Personal information
- Full name: Andrei Borissov
- Date of birth: 1 August 1969 (age 57)
- Place of birth: Tallinn, then part of Estonian SSR, Soviet Union
- Height: 1.77 m (5 ft 10 in)
- Position: Midfielder

Senior career*
Years	Team	Apps	(Gls)
1988–1989	Zvezda Tallinn	41	(16)
1990	SK Sport Tallinn	26	(5)
1991	KSK Vigri Tallinn	16	(8)
1992–1995	FC Norma Tallinn	72	(32)
1995–1998	FC Lantana Tallinn	64	(16)
1998–2001	FF Jaro	84	(12)
2002–2008	FC TVMK Tallinn	217	(23)
2009–2010	FC Ajax Lasnamäe	35	(2)
2011	FC Infonet	37	(1)
2012	Tartu SK 10	36	(2)
2013–2017	Maardu Linnameeskond	88	(6)

International career
1993	Estonia	14	(0)

Managerial career
- 2009–2010: FC Ajax Lasnamäe
- 2011: FC Infonet
- 2012: Tartu SK 10
- 2013–2019: Maardu Linnameeskond
- * Club domestic league appearances and goals

Andrei Borissov (born 1 August 1969 in Tallinn) is an Estonian football coach and former professional footballer. He played the position of midfielder and is 1.77 m tall and weighs 76 kg. Borissov is the former member of the Estonia national football team, with 14 caps to his name.

From 2009 Borissov has been acting as a playing coach in Ajax Lasnamäe, FC Infonet, Tartu SK 10 and Maardu Linnameeskond, mostly in Esiliiga. In August 2018, According to the reports, Borissov was selected as the best coach in June and July.
