= Serhiy Morozov (footballer, born 1961) =

Ukrainian footballer

Personal information
- Full name: Serhiy Mykolayovych Morozov
- Date of birth: 15 January 1961 (age 65)
- Place of birth: Zhdanov, Ukrainian SSR
- Height: 1.84 m (6 ft 0 in)
- Position: Forward

Senior career*
Years	Team	Apps	(Gls)
1978–1980	Shakhtar Donetsk	13	(1)
1980–1981	SKA Kyiv	6	(0)
1981–1982	CSKA Moscow	22	(4)
1982–1986	Shakhtar Donetsk	98	(21)
1986	Novator Mariupol	12	(7)
1987	Metalist Kharkiv	0	(0)
1987–1988	Metalurh Zaporizhzhia	53	(20)
1988	Nyva Vinnytsia	14	(5)
1989	Tavriya Simferopol	15	(4)
1989–1991	Sudostroitel Mykolaiv	82	(37)
1991–1994	MTK Budapest	24	(4)
1994	Evis Mykolaiv	7	(0)
1994	Tavria Kherson	4	(0)
1994	Metalurh Zaporizhzhia	4	(0)
1994–1995	Lantana Tallinn	20	(25)
1995	Vidus Riga	5	(0)
1996–1997	Hidroliznyk Olshanske (amateurs)		
1997–1998	Olimpia Yuzhnoukrainsk	7	(1)
1999	Kolos Stepove (amateurs)	3	(1)
- * Club domestic league appearances and goals

Serhiy N. Morozov (Ukrainian: Сергій Миколайович Морозов, Serhiy Mykolayovych Morozov; born 15 January 1961) is a former professional footballer from Ukraine who played as a forward. He became topscorer of the Meistriliiga 1994–95 (Estonian Premier League) by scoring 25 goals for Lantana Marlekor. He also played as a professional in Latvia. His last club was Olimpia Yuzhnoukrainsk from Ukraine. As of 2006, Morozov was working as a youth coach at MFC Mykolaiv.

== Honours ==
Shakhtar Donetsk

- Soviet Cup: 1980, 1983
- USSR Super Cup: 1983

Individual

- Meistriliiga top goalscorer: 1994–95
