= 1995–96 Esiliiga =

Estonian football league season for second division

Esiliiga
- Season: 1995–96
- Champions: FC Norma Tallinn
- Promoted: JK Vall Tallinn
- Relegated: FC Arsenal Tallinn; DAG Tartu

The 1995–96 Esiliiga is the fifth season of the Esiliiga, second-highest Estonian league for association football clubs, since its establishment in 1992. The season was won by FC Norma Tallinn.

== Main tournament ==
Four best teams qualify to the Premier Division promotion play-off, other four to First Division promotion play-off.

=== Table ===
Pos	Team	Pld	W	D	L	GF	GA	GD	Pts
1	FC Norma Tallinn	14	13	0	1	59	5	+54	39
2	JK Vall Tallinn	14	9	1	4	36	20	+16	28
3	Tallinna Jalgpallikool	14	7	1	6	19	30	−11	22
4	JK Dünamo Tallinn	14	7	1	6	35	30	+5	22
5	FC Lelle	14	6	2	6	32	30	+2	20
6	JK Tulevik Viljandi	14	6	0	8	28	34	−6	18
7	FC Arsenal Tallinn	14	5	0	9	26	31	−5	15
8	DAG Tartu	14	0	1	13	12	67	−55	1

Source: rsssf.com

== Premier Division promotion play-off ==
JK Vall Tallinn promoted to Premier Division, Pärnu JK relegated to First Division.

=== Table ===
Pos	Team	Pld	W	D	L	GF	GA	GD	Pts
1	Eesti Põlevkivi Jõhvi	10	7	0	3	23	7	+16	21
2	JK Vall Tallinn (P)	10	7	0	3	18	9	+9	21
3	FC Norma Tallinn	10	5	2	3	13	11	+2	17
4	Pärnu JK (R)	10	4	2	4	12	20	−8	14
5	JK Dünamo Tallinn	10	2	2	6	8	14	−6	8
6	Tallinna Jalgpallikool	10	1	2	7	9	22	−13	5

Source: rsssf.com
(P) Promoted; (R) Relegated

== First Division promotion play-off ==
JK Kalev Sillamäe and Olümp Maardu promoted to First Division, FC Arsenal Tallinn and DAG Tartu relegated to Second Division.

=== Table ===
Pos	Team	Pld	W	D	L	GF	GA	GD	Pts
1	FC Lelle	12	9	0	3	34	20	+14	27
2	JK Kalev Sillamäe (P)	12	8	1	3	30	10	+20	25
3	Olümp Maardu (P)	12	6	2	4	29	20	+9	20
4	JK Tulevik Viljandi	12	6	1	5	30	17	+13	19
5	FC Arsenal Tallinn (R)	12	6	1	5	31	20	+11	19
6	DAG Tartu (R)	12	3	0	9	20	42	−22	9
7	Lokomotiiv Valga	12	0	1	11	11	59	−48	1
–	United Pärnu (Note: United Pärnu were withdrew from the play-off.)	0	0	0	0	0	0	0	0

Source: rsssf.com
(P) Promoted; (R) Relegated

== See also ==
- 1995–96 Meistriliiga
- 1995 in Estonian football
- 1996 in Estonian football
