= Rimantas Žvingilas =

Lithuanian footballer

Personal information
- Date of birth: 3 September 1973 (age 53)
- Place of birth: Klaipėda, Lithuania
- Height: 1.78 m (5 ft 10 in)
- Position: Striker

Senior career*
Years	Team	Apps	(Gls)
1991–1992	FK Sirijus Klaipėda	28	(0)
1994	Aras Klaipėda	17	(9)
1995–1996	Kareda Šiauliai	49	(13)
1997–2000	K.R.C. Harelbeke	49	(6)
2000–2001	Torpedo Moscow	21	(3)
2002	Dynamo Saint Petersburg	11	(2)
2002	Atlantas	9	(1)
2003	Shakhter Karagandy	17	(2)
2004	FBK Kaunas	10	(6)
2005–2009	Atlantas	103	(12)

International career
1995–2001	Lithuania	25	(3)

Managerial career
- 2010: Atlantas (interim)
- 2010–2011: Bergsøy
- 2013–2017: Atlantas (assistant)
- 2017: Atlantas (interim)
- * Club domestic league appearances and goals

Rimantas ("Rimas") Žvingilas (born 3 September 1973) is a Lithuanian former international football striker. He has played in his home country, in Belgium, in several clubs in Russia, and in Kazakhstan.

He retired on 7 July 2009.

Žvingilas made 25 appearances for the Lithuania national football team between 1995 and 2001.

On 25 November 2010, Žvingilas was appointed head coach at Norwegian Division 3 team Bergsøy IL. His contract was terminated by mutual consent on 24 April 2011. A press release cited that Zvilingas wanted to spend more time with his family as the reason.

== Honours ==
- Baltic Cup
  - 1996
