= 1995 in Estonian football =

- Meistriliiga champions
- FC Flora Tallinn
- Esiliiga champions
- JK Vall Tallinn
- Estonian Cup winners
- FC Flora Tallinn
- Teams in Europe
- FC Flora Tallinn, Lantana/Marlekor
- Estonian national team
- 1995 Baltic Cup; 1996 UEFA Euro qualifying
- Estonian Footballer of the Year
- Martin Reim

The 1995 season was the fourth full year of competitive football (soccer) in Estonia since gaining independence from the Soviet Union on 20 August 1991.

== Estonian FA Cup ==
=== Semifinals ===
Tallinna Sadam JK	0 – 3 0 – 3	FC Flora

Lantana/Marlekor	2 – 1 1 – 0	Trans Narva

=== Final ===
FC Flora	2–0	Lantana/Marlekor
Kristal 59'; Zdančius 72'

== National Team ==
Date	Venue	Opponents	Score	Comp	Estonia scorers	Fixture
1995-01-04	Thong Nhat Stadium; Ho Chi Minh City	Vietnam	1 – 0	F		—
1995-02-06	GSZ Stadium; Larnaca	Norway	7 – 0	F		—
1995-02-15	GSZ Stadium; Larnaca	Cyprus	3 – 1	F	Reim 76' (pen.)	—
1995-03-25	Stadio Arechi; Salerno	Italy	4 – 1	EC96	Reim 72'	—
1995–03–29	Ljudski vrt Maribor	Slovenia	3 – 0	EC96		—
1995-04-26	Kadrioru Stadium; Tallinn	Ukraine	0 – 1	EC96		—
1995-05-19	Daugava Stadium; Riga	Latvia	2 – 0	BC95		—
1995-05-20	Daugava Stadium; Riga	Lithuania	7 – 0	BC95		—
1995-06-11	Kadrioru Stadium; Tallinn	Slovenia	1 – 3	EC96	Reim 26'	—
1995-08-16	Kadrioru Stadium; Tallinn	Lithuania	0 – 1	EC96		—
1995-09-03	Maksimir Stadium; Zagreb	Croatia	7 – 1	EC96	Reim 17'	—
1995-10-10	Žalgiris Stadium; Vilnius	Lithuania	5 – 0	EC96		—
