= 1994 in Estonian football =

- Meistriliiga champions
- FC Flora Tallinn
- Esiliiga champions
- JK Pärnu Kalev
- Estonian Cup winners
- FC Norma Tallinn
- Teams in Europe
- FC Norma Tallinn, FC Flora Tallinn
- Estonian national team
- 1994 Baltic Cup; 1996 UEFA Euro qualifying
- Estonian Footballer of the Year
- Mart Poom

The 1994 season was the third full year of competitive football (soccer) in Estonia since gaining independence from the Soviet Union on 20 August 1991.

== Estonian FA Cup ==
=== Quarterfinals ===
FC Norma	10–0	Tallinna Jalgpallikool

FC Flora	1–0	Tallinna Sadam

Trans Narva	0–0	Nikol/Marlekor
Penalties
	5–4

Tervis Pärnu	0–4	JK Dünamo Tallinn

=== Semifinals ===
FC Norma	0 – 0 1 – 1	FC Flora

JK Dünamo Tallinn	1 – 5 0 – 1	Trans Narva

=== Final ===
Norma Tallinn	4–1	Trans Narva

== National team ==
=== Senior team ===
Date	Venue	Opponents	Score	Comp	Estonia scorers	Fixture
1994-03-09	Paralimni Stadium; Paralimni	Cyprus	2 – 0	F		—
1994-05-07	Titan Stadium; Fullerton	United States	4 – 0	F		—
1994-05-23	Kadrioru Stadium; Tallinn	Wales	1 – 2	F	Reim 86'	—
1994-06-01	City Stadium; Skopje	North Macedonia	2 – 0	F		—
1994-07-29	Žalgiris Stadium; Vilnius	Lithuania	3- 0	BC94		—
1994-07-30	Žalgiris Stadium; Vilnius	Latvia	0 – 2	BC94		—
1994-08-16	Akureyrarvöllur; Akureyri	Iceland	4 – 0	F		—
1994-09-04	Kadrioru Stadium; Tallinn	Croatia	0 – 2	EC96		—
1994-10-08	Kadrioru Stadium; Tallinn	Italy	0 – 2	EC96		—
1994-10-26	Kadrioru Stadium; Tallinn	Finland	0 – 7	F		—
1994-11-06	FK Ozolnieki Stadium; Ozolnieki	Latvia	0 – 0	F		—
1994-11-13	Olimpiysky National Sports Complex; Kyiv	Ukraine	3 – 0	EC96		—
