= 1991 in Estonian football =

- Meistriliiga champions
- VMK Tallinn
- Esiliiga champions
- Kalev Tartu
- Estonian Cup winners
- VMK Tallinn
- Teams in Europe
- None
- Estonian national team
- 1991 Baltic Cup

The 1991 season was the 71st season of competitive football (soccer) in Estonia, and the last one in the Baltic country as a part of the Soviet Union. The championship began in the spring of 1991. In the First Division or Premier League ("Meistriliiga") thirteen teams played, in the Second Division ("Esiliiga") twelve teams. The Third Division played in regional groups followed by a promotion play-off on completion of the group stage.

== Cup Final ==
VMK Tallinn	0–0	Keemik Kohtla-Järve
Penalties
	4–3

== National Team ==
Date	Venue	Opponents	Score	Comp	Estonia scorers	Fixture
1991-11-15	Žalgiris Stadium; Klaipėda	Lithuania	4 – 1	Baltic Cup	Kirs 14'	—
1991-11-16	Žalgiris Stadium; Klaipėda	Latvia	2 – 0	Baltic Cup		—

== Births ==
- 2 January - Katrin Loo, footballer
