= Sepo Vilderson =

Estonian footballer

Seppo Vilderson
Personal information
- Full name: Seppo Vilderson
- Date of birth: 7 February 1963 (age 63)
- Place of birth: Tallinn, then part of Estonian SSR, Soviet Union
- Position: Midfielder

International career^{‡}
Years	Team	Apps	(Gls)
1993	Estonia	1	(0)
- ‡ National team caps and goals as of 23 May 2009

Seppo Vilderson (born 7 February 1963) is a retired Estonian professional football (soccer) player. He played for several clubs, including FC Norma Tallinn (1981–1990).

== International career ==
Vilderson earned his first and only official cap for the Estonia national football team on 5 September 1993, when Estonia played Portugal in a World Cup Qualifier. He came up as a substitute for Martin Reim after 71 minutes. Vilderson also played in Finland during his career.
