= 1996 Baltic Cup =

Tournament details
- Host country: Estonia
- Dates: 7 July – 10 July
- Teams: 3
- Venue(s): 1 (in 1 host city)

Final positions
- Champions: Lithuania (6th title)
- Runners-up: Estonia
- Third place: Latvia

Tournament statistics
- Matches played: 3
- Goals scored: 7 (2.33 per match)
- Attendance: 2,350 (783 per match)
- Top scorer(s): Seven players (1 goal each)

The 1996 Baltic Cup football competition took place from 7 to 10 July 1996 at the Kreenholmi Stadium in Narva, Estonia. It was the sixth annual competition of the three Baltic states; Latvia, Lithuania and Estonia; since they regained their independence from the Soviet Union in 1991.

== Final table ==
Team	Pld	W	D	L	GF	GA	GD	Pts
Lithuania	2	1	1	0	3	2	+1	4
Estonia	2	0	2	0	2	2	0	2
Latvia	2	0	1	1	2	3	−1	1

== Results ==
=== Estonia vs Latvia ===
7 July 1996

Estonia	1–1	Latvia
Rooba 36'		Bulders 16'

Kreenholmi Stadium, Narva
Attendance: 350
Referee: Gintaras Dilda (Lithuania)

=== Lithuania vs Latvia ===
8 July 1996

Lithuania	2–1	Latvia
Ražanauskas 5' (pen.); Zdančius 68' (pen.)		Jelisejevs 44'

Kreenholmi Stadium, Narva
Attendance: 1,000
Referee: Jüri Saar (Estonia)

=== Estonia vs Lithuania ===
9 July 1996

Estonia	1–1	Lithuania
Reim 21'		Žvingilas 18' (pen.)

Kreenholmi Stadium, Narva
Attendance: 1,000
Referee: Braga (Latvia)

== Winners ==
1996 Baltic Football Cup winners

Lithuania
Sixth title

== Statistics ==
=== Goalscorers ===
There were 7 goals scored in 3 matches, for an average of 2.33 goals per match.

1 goal

- (Estonia) Martin Reim
- (Estonia) Urmas Rooba
- (Latvia) Rolands Bulders
- (Latvia) Aleksandrs Jelisejevs
- (Lithuania) Rimantas Žvingilas
- (Lithuania) Tomas Ražanauskas
- (Lithuania) Ričardas Zdančius
