= Jaanus Sirel =

Estonian footballer

Personal information
- Full name: Jaanus Sirel
- Date of birth: 29 July 1975 (age 51)
- Place of birth: Pechory, Russian SFSR, Soviet Union
- Height: 1.95 m (6 ft 5 in)
- Positions: Defender; midfielder

Senior career*
Years	Team	Apps	(Gls)
1992–1995	DAG Tartu	36	(0)
1996–1997	Lelle SK	16	(1)
1998–2002	JK Viljandi Tulevik	95	(11)
2000	→ FC Kuressaare (loan)	16	(2)
2002	FC Elva	5	(1)
2003–2004	JK Viljandi Tulevik	51	(3)
2004	FC Elva	4	(0)
2005–2006	JK Maag Tartu	68	(2)
2007–2008	JK Maag Tammeka	32	(2)

International career
2003	Estonia	1	(1)
- * Club domestic league appearances and goals

Jaanus Sirel (born 29 July 1975 in Pechory, Russia) is an Estonian former professional footballer. He was playing the position of defender and midfielder.

Former clubs include DAG Tartu, Lelle SK, JK Viljandi Tulevik, FC Kuressaare, FC Elva, JK Maag Tartu and JK Maag Tammeka Tartu.

Sirel played once for the Estonia national team.
