= Ričardas Zdančius =

Lithuanian footballer

Personal information
- Date of birth: 17 January 1967 (age 59)
- Place of birth: Gargždai

Senior career*
Years	Team	Apps	(Gls)
1987–1989	FK Žalgiris	7	(0)
1990	Odishi Zugdidi	18	(1)
1991–1994	FK Žalgiris	69	(16)
1994–1995	Flora Tallinn	23	(12)
1995–1996	FC Wil	?	(4)
1996–1997	Flora Tallinn	13	(3)
1997–1998	Sportfreunde Siegen	11	(1)
1998–1999	TuS Lingen	?	(?)
1998–2001	1. SC Göttingen 05	53	(1)
2001	FK Vėtra	8	(2)
2001–2002	1. SC Göttingen 05	29	(1)
2002	FK Vėtra	?	(6)
Total		231	(47)

International career
1992–1996	Lithuania	23	(4)
- * Club domestic league appearances and goals

Ričardas Zdančius (born 17 January 1967) is a Lithuanian former professional footballer, member of the Lithuania national team. He won a total of 23 international caps, scoring 4 goals for the Lithuania national football team.

== Honours ==
- Baltic Cup
  - 1996
