= FC Lantana Tallinn =

Estonian football club

- Full name: Football Club Lantana Tallinn
- Founded: 1994
- Dissolved: 1999
- Ground: Viimsi Stadium, Viimsi
- Capacity: 2,000
- Chairman: Sergei Belov
- Manager: Juri Tšurilkin
- League: Meistriliiga
- 1999: Meistriliiga, 6th
Home colours	Away colours

FC Lantana Tallinn is an Estonian defunct football club. Lantana won the Estonian Meistriliiga in 1996 and 1997. The club was dissolved after the 1999 season.

== History ==
=== FC Tevalte - first privately held football club in Estonia ===
In 1993 Sergei Belov purchased KSK Vigri to establish FC Tevalte - Estonia’s first ever privately held professional football club. The newly-formed club retained some of the most talented young players from Vigri and signed three key players from FC Norma: Andrei Borissov, Sergei Bragin and Eduard Vinogradov. Additionally, Tevalte brought in three former USSR champions with FC Zenit Saint Petersburg: Mikhail Biryukov, Sergey Kuznetsov, Vladimir Dolgopolov, the future Meistriliiga all-time top scorer Maksim Gruznov. Notably, Tevalte also introduced the first Brazilians to Estonian Mesitriliiga—Milton and Alberto Romualdo. One game before the end of the season and while leading the league level on points with FC Norma and FC Flora, Tevalte was disqualified on match-fixing allegations based on complaints from four Meistriliiga referees. The season’s outcome was eventually decided in a title play-off game between FC Flora and FC Norma, however, as a protest against FC Tevalte disqualification, Norma fielded their youth players and lost the game 5-2.

=== FC Lantana ===
Although Belov filed a complaint against disqualification, he went on to establish a new club using FC Nikol license (direct successors of FC TVMK that were carrying a name of a transport company Nikol AS during the previous season). The newly-found club was named Lantana-Markekor, where Marlekor was a reference to Markekor AS - the company that privatized TVMK factory. The new club was mostly formed out of FC Tevalte players.

During the first season under the name of Lantana, Belov’s club finished the season in second place, one point behind FC Flora.

Following the 1994-95 season, UEFA overturned Estonian FA decision to ban FC Tevalte and the club was reinstated in Meistriliiga due to insufficient evidence supporting the match-fixing allegations. Since Sergei Belov was already running a new club at the time, the slot regained by FC Tevalte was purchased by AS Marlekor - the company directly connected to FC TVMK. As a result, the Marlekor’s name was dropped from Lantana-Marlekor and Lantana continued to operate on their own whereas the team ran by TVMK owners played the 1995-96 season as FC Tevalte-Marlekor maintaining a reference to Tevalte, due to using their license for one season. Tevalte-Marlekor became the true continuation of TVMK, welcoming back some former TVMK/Nikol players, including player-coach Vjatšeslav Smirnov. This team had no affiliations with Belov’s Tevalte or Lantana/Lantana-Marlekor clubs.

In 1996, after extensive negotiations, legal battles in Estonian courts, and an appeal to FIFA, Estonian Football Association agreed to pay FC Lantana EEK200k for the 1994 disqualification of FC Tevalte. Lantana secured the 1995-96 Meistriliiga title two games before the season’s end, defeating FC Tevalte-Marlekor 2-0 with goals in the second half. During the season Urmas Hepner and Igor Prins stood out in defense, while Andrei Borissov was praised for his midfield presence. Lantana further etched their name in history by becoming the first Estonian football club to reach the second qualifying round of a UEFA competition, beating Iceland’s ÍBV 2-1 at home and drawing 0-0 away - the fate Lantana could have achieved a season earlier, following a 2-1 defeat of DAG-Liepāja - the result that was overturned by UEFA due to Lantana fielding an ineligible player.

The following season, Lantana defended their title, finishing three points above FC Flora. However, they fell to third place, trailing the champions by 17 points during the 1997-98 season. Despite operating on a significantly smaller budget than rivals FC Flora, Lantana confirmed qualifying for European competitions would be their ultimate goal for the 1998 transitional Meistriliiga season.

Lantana finished the 1998 season in third place, 10 points behind champions FC Flora and 9 points behind second-placed JK Tallinna Sadam.

Lack of sponsorship financing and decrease in UEFA payouts resulted in significant budget shortages for the club following the 1998 season and saw Lantana finish in 6th place, just three points above the relegation zone in 1999. The club’s European campaign was also unsuccessful. In UEFA cup, where Lantana qualified through their 3rd place finish a season earlier, the team suffered a 9-2 aggregate defeat from Torpedo Kutaisi.

Despite finishing above the relegation zone, Lantana withdrew from the following Meistriliiga season due to financial difficulties and lack of UEFA funding.

=== After FC Lantana ===
Following the dissolution of FC Lantana, the club's owner Sergei Belov, who also played for Lantana as a player, went on to play several games for FC TVMK and JK Narva Trans in 2000 and 2001. In 2010 he was convicted for his role in drug trafficking. His father, Anatoli Belov, who acted as a manager for FC Lantana throughout most of the club's history, concentrated on coaching his younger son Aleksei. Aleksei Belov went on to play for several Meistriliiga clubs including FC Flora, FC TVMK and JK Narva Trans. Aleksei also scored 7 goals in 18 games for Estonia U19 national team.

== Achievements ==
- Meistriliiga
  - Champions (2): 1995–96, 1996–97
- Estonian SuperCup
  - Winners (1): 1997

== Lantana Tallinn in Estonian Football Championship ==
Season	League	Pos	Pld	W	D	L	GF	GA	GD	Pts	Top Goalscorer
1994–95	1	2	14	10	3	1	44	7	37	33	Serhiy Morozov (25)
1994–95	1C	2	10	7	2	1	26	9	15	23	Serhiy Morozov (25)
1995–96	1	1	14	10	3	1	37	8	29	33	Maksim Gruznov (12)
1995–96	1C	1	10	6	2	2	21	7	14	20	Maksim Gruznov (12)
1996–97	1	1	14	11	2	1	30	9	21	35	Sergei Bragin (18)
1996–97	1C	1	10	7	2	1	22	6	16	23	Sergei Bragin (18)
1997–98	1	3	14	5	4	5	20	17	3	19	Vitali Leitan (9)
1997–98	1C	3	10	4	3	3	17	17	0	15	Vitali Leitan (9)
1998	1	3	14	7	4	3	27	20	7	25	
1999	1	6	28	5	9	13	31	52	−21	27	Vitali Leitan (15)

== Lantana Tallinn in Europe ==
- 1Q = First Qualifying Round
- 2Q = Second Qualifying Round

Season	Cup	Round	Country	Club	Home	Away	Agg.
1995/96	Cup Winners' Cup	1Q	(Latvia)	DAG-Liepāja	0–0	0–3^{1}	0–3
1996/97	UEFA Cup	1Q	(Iceland)	Íþróttabandalag Vestmannaeyja	2–1	0–0	2–1
		2Q	(Switzerland)	FC Aarau	2–0	0–4	2–4
1997/98	Champions League	1Q	(Finland)	FC Jazz	0–2	0–1	0–3
1998/99	Cup Winners' Cup	1Q	(Scotland)	Heart of Midlothian FC	0–1	0–5	0–6
1999/00	UEFA Cup	1Q	(Georgia (country))	Torpedo Kutaisi	0–5	2–4	2–9

^{1}FC Lantana won the away game 2-1. DAG-Liepaya was awarded a 3-0 win due to FC Lanatana fielding an ineligible player.
