= Narva Kreenholm Stadium =

Stadium in Narva, Estonia

Narva Kreenholmi staadion
- Kreenholmi staadion
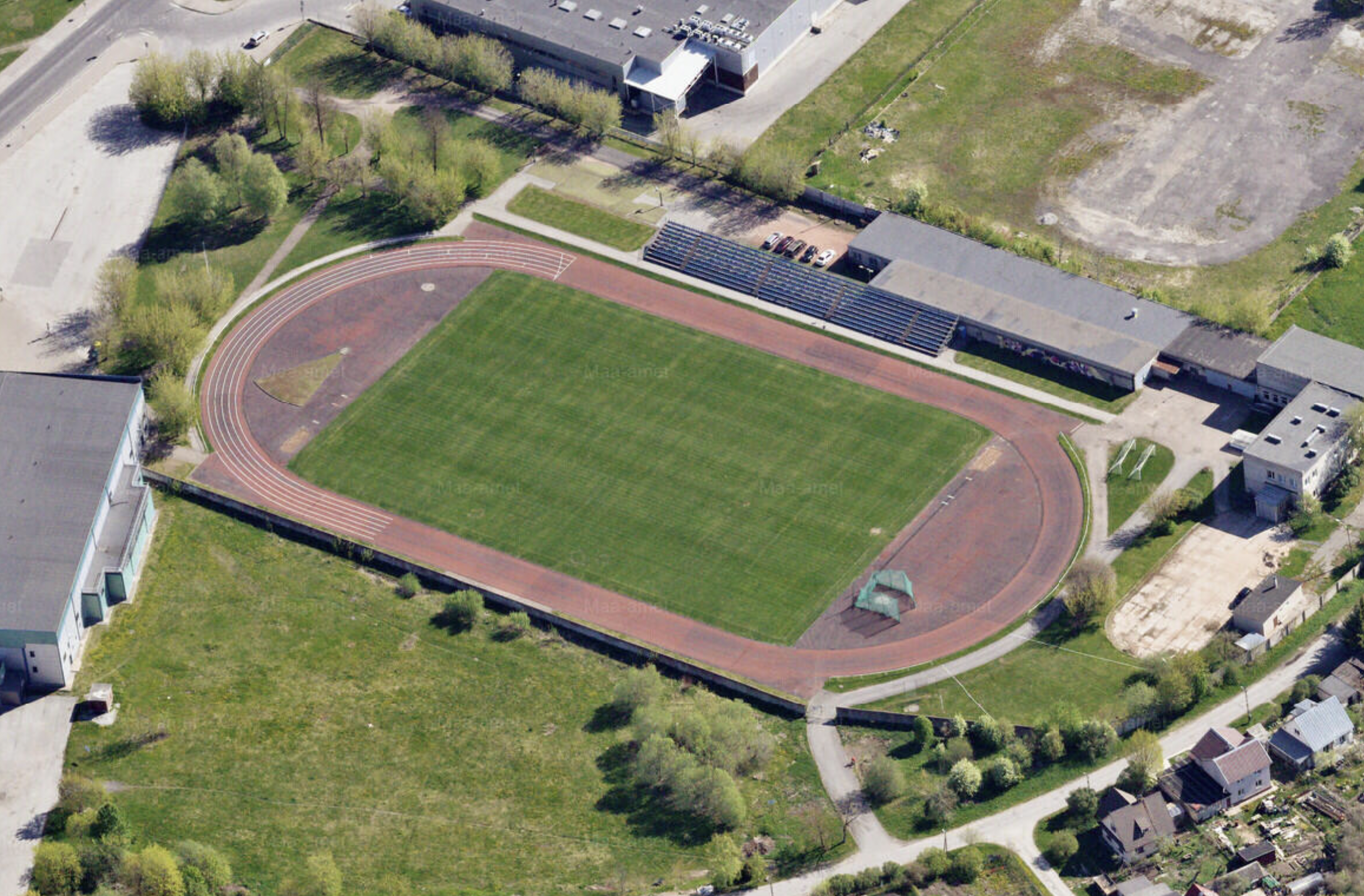
- Interactive map of Narva Kreenholmi staadion
- Location: Narva, Estonia
- Coordinates: 59.3635°N 28.1845°E
- Owner: City of Narva
- Capacity: 1,065
- Surface: Grass
- Field size: 102 × 75 m

Construction
- Opened: 1969

Tenant
- JK Narva Trans (1979–present)

Narva Kreenholm Stadium (also Kreenholm Stadium; Estonian: Narva Kreenholmi staadion) is a multi-purpose stadium in Narva, Estonia. The stadium holds 1,065 people and hosts the matches of JK Narva Trans.

It is one of the easternmost stadiums in Estonia and is situated approximately 900 metres from the border of Russia and the Narva river that separates the two countries.

The stadium was the host venue for the 1996 Baltic Cup, which was won by Lithuania.

== Condition and future ==
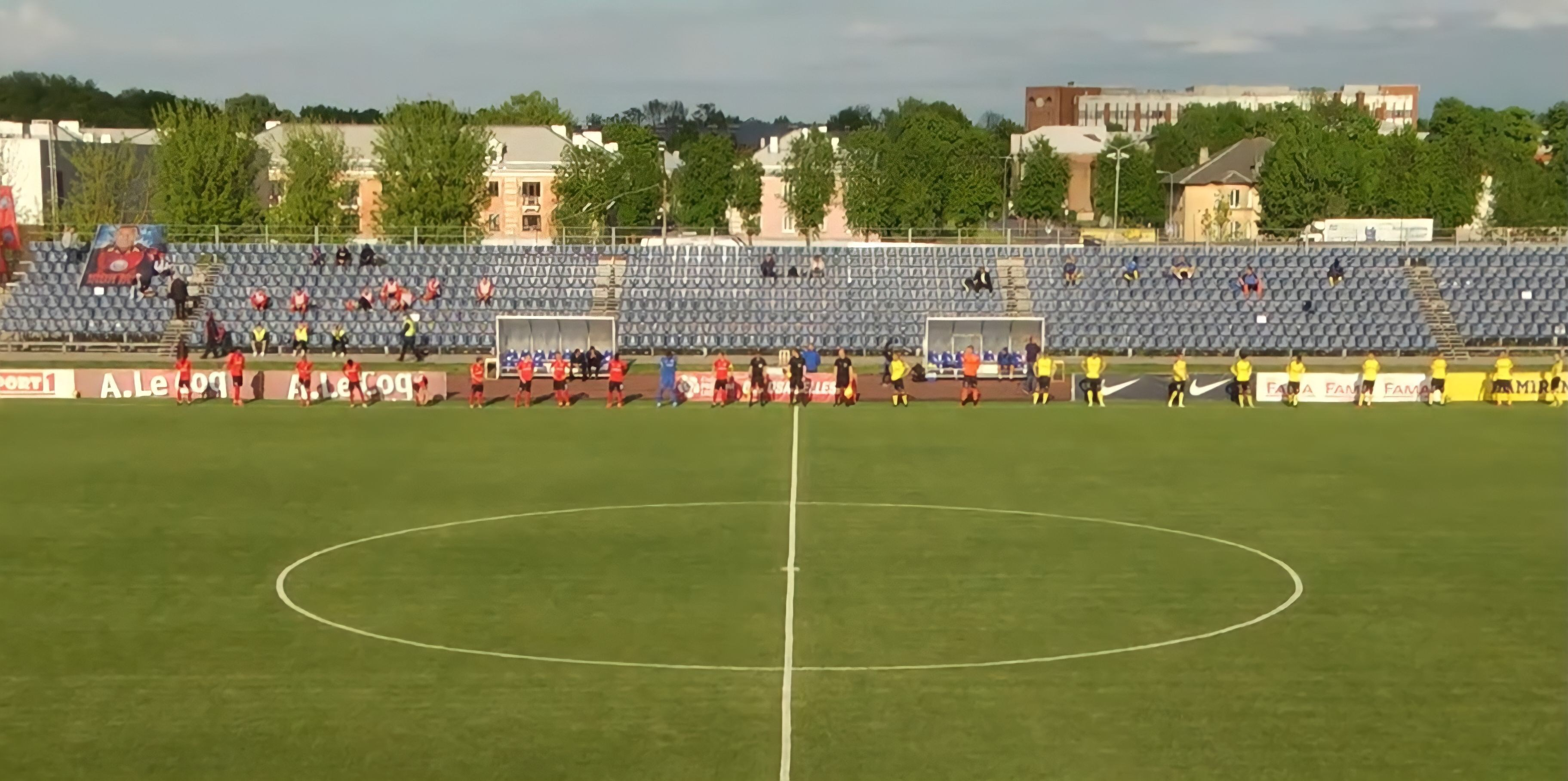
The grandstand of Kreenholm Stadium in 2020

The condition of the Kreenholm Stadium has been under criticism for several decades and Narva Trans have been forced to play their European matches at Rakvere, due to Kreenholm not meeting the UEFA requirements.

Narva estimates that the reconstruction of the stadium will cost more than 25 million euros. According to the development plan set in place in 2023, the city aims to finance the stadium project in 2025–2027, but has also admitted that without financial support from the state, implementing such project could prove to be difficult.

== Estonia national team matches ==
Narva Kreenholm Stadium has hosted two Estonia national football team matches.

Date		Result	Competition	Attendance
7 July 1996	Estonia – Latvia	1–1	1996 Baltic Cup	350
9 July 1996	Estonia – Lithuania	1–1	1996 Baltic Cup	350

== See also ==
Nearby sights:

- Kreenholmi Manufaktuur
- Narva Falls
