= SK Tapa =

Estonian handball club

SK Tapa is an Estonian sport club, which is located in Tapa, Lääne-Viru County. The strongest branch of the club is handball section, which competes in Meistriliiga.

In 1990s and 2000s, the club also had a football team, which played in III and IV league.
