= Valga Keskstaadion =

Stadium in Valga, Estonia

Coordinates: 57°46′37.82″N 26°2′28.95″E

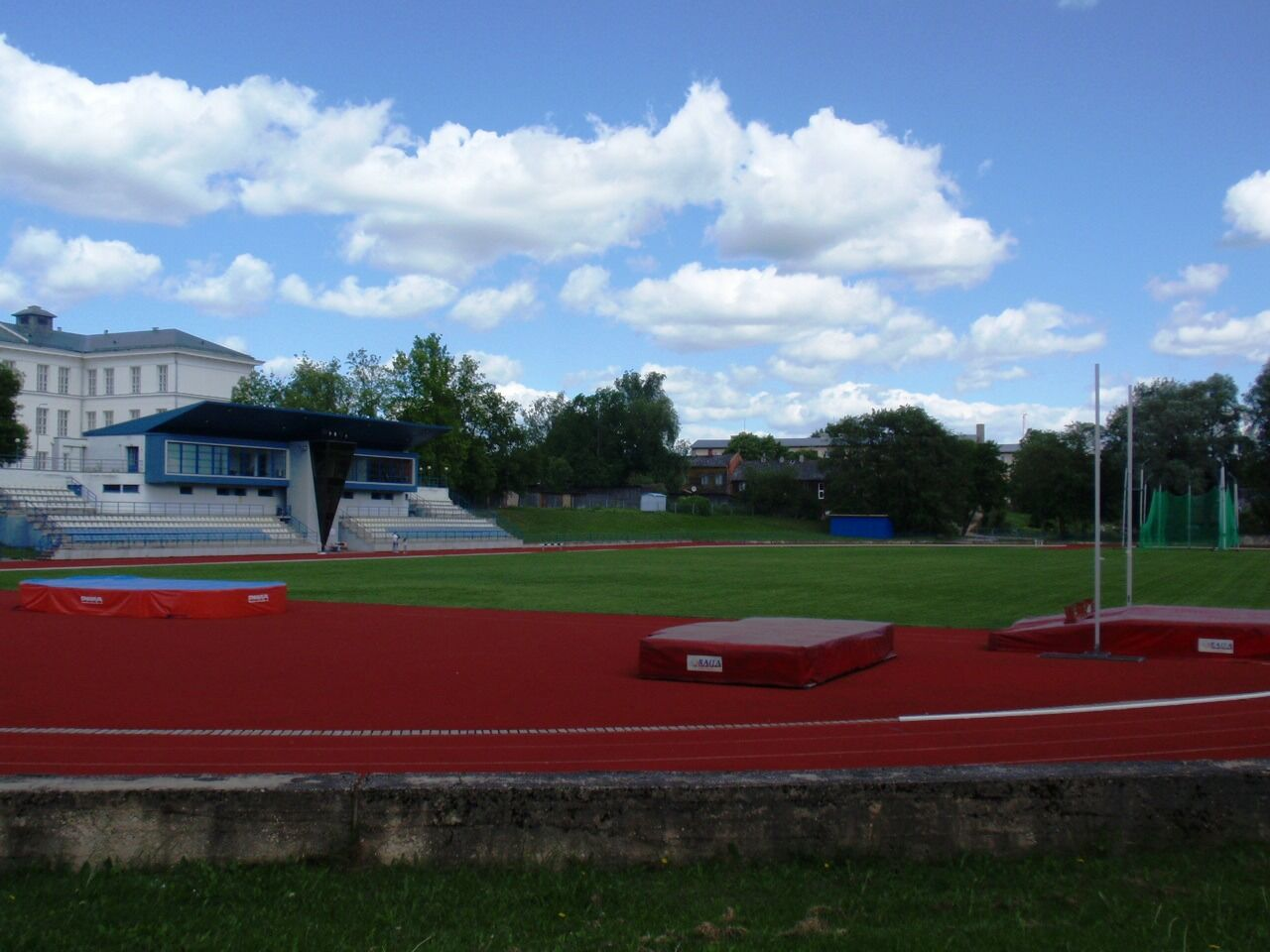
- Interactive map of Valga Keskstaadion
- Location: Valga, Estonia
- Capacity: 452

Construction
- Opened: 1956
- Renovated: 2008

Valga Keskstaadion (Central stadium of Valga) is a multi-use stadium in the town of Valga, Estonia. It is currently used mostly for athletics and football matches. The stadium holds 452 people and was opened in 1956.

== Estonia national football team matches ==
Valga has hosted two Estonia national football team matches, once in 1998 and once in 2003.

Date		Result	Competition	Attendance
25 June 1998	Estonia – Latvia	0–2	1998 Baltic Cup	300
3 July 2003	Estonia – Lithuania	1–5	2003 Baltic Cup	800

== Athletics records ==
Updated in 2018.

=== Men ===
Event	Record	Athlete	Team/Nationality	Year
100 m	10.45	Argo Golberg	Audentes	2003
200 m	20.69	Marek Niit	Saare	2007
400 m	47.19	Inguns Svikliņš	Latvia	1999
800 m	1:48.08	Dmitrijs Jurkevics	TÜ ASK	2007
1500 m	3:50.8	Teet Annus	Harju	1975
2000 m	5:13.54	Pavel Loskutov	Valga	1998
3000 m	8.24,32	Mārtiņš Alksnis	Latvia	1999
5000 m	14:15.73	Pavel Loskutov	TÜ ASK	2007
10,000 m	30:14.5	Pavel Loskutov	TÜ ASK	2007
110 m hurdles	14.21	Tarmo Jallai	Tartu ÜSK	2003
400 m hurdles	51.11	Indrek Tustit	Tartu ÜSK	2002
3000 m steeplechase	9:23.38	Aleksei Saveljev	Haapsalu	2000
10,000 m walk	38:56.3	Ingus Janevics	Latvia	2008
20,000 m walk	1:31:02.6	Olav Laiv	Jõgeva	1975
4 × 110 m hurdles relay	63.1	Rakvere KJK Vike		2003
4 × 100 m relay	41.62	Pärnu SK Altius		2004
4 × 400 m relay	3:16.88	Tallinna "Kalev" KJK		1999
4 × 1500 m relay	16:15.31	Nõmme KJK		1999
100+200+400+800 m relay	3:13.53	Spordiklubi "Nõva"		1999
Long jump	7.93	Andrejs Maškancevs	Latvia	2007
High jump	2.21	Rainer Piirimets	Audentes	2004
Triple jump	17.00	Jaanus Uudmäe	Nõmme	2008
Pole vault	5.50	Mareks Arents	Latvia	2018
Shot put	19.98	Taavi Peetre	Tartu ÜSK	2005
Discus throw	70.12	Gerd Kanter	SS Kalev	2007
Javelin throw	87.83	Andrus Värnik	Lõunalõvi	2003
Hammer throw	61.10	Mati Luht	EPA	1975
Decathlon	7224	Päärn Brauer	Leksi 44	2003

=== Women ===
Event	Record	Athlete	Club/Nationality	Year
100 m	11.75	Katrin Käärt	Pärnu Kalev	2003
200 m	23.41	Natallia Solohub	Belarus	1998
400 m	53.71	Agnė Orlauskaitė	Lithuania	2008
800 m	2:05.81	Maile Mangusson	Tallinna "Kalev"	2001
1500 m	4:34.01	Liina Tšernov	Tipp	2007
3000 m	10:22.61	Jekaterina Patjuk	Tartu ÜSK	2003
100 m hurdles	13.35	Corien Botha	South Africa	1998
400 m hurdles	59.82	Maris Mägi	Tartu	2005
5000 m walk	21:13.3	Jolanta Dukure	Latvia	2006
4 × 100 m hurdles relay	59.36	Tartu ÜSK		2003
4 × 100 m relay	47.36	Tartu ÜSK		2003
4 × 400 m relay	3:44.29	Tartu ÜSK		2003
3 × 800 m relay	6:47.4	Tallinna Spordiselts "Kalev"		2001
Swedish relay	2:10.81	Tartu ÜSK		2003
Long jump	6.65	Ksenja Balta	SS Kalev	2008
High jump	1.96	Tatjana Kivimägi	Russia	2008
Triple jump	14.04	Kaire Leibak	Tartu Kalev	2007
Pole vault	4.00	Reena Koll	KJK Harta	2012
Shot put	15.33	Anu Teesaar	Nõmme KJK	2007
Discus throw	53.98	Eha Rünne	Tallinna "Kalev"	2007
Javelin throw	56.75	Ilze Gribule	Latvia	2006
Hammer throw	57.61	Maris Rõngelep	Audentes	2004
Heptathlon	4557 p	Age Lehter	Hiiumaa	1999
Decathlon	6411 p	Anu Teesaar	Nõmme KJK	2004
