= JK Narva Trans =

Association football club in Estonia

Narva Trans
- Full name: Jalgpalliklubi Narva Trans
- Founded: 1979; 47 years ago (as Avtomobilist)
- Ground: Narva Kalev-Fama Stadium
- Capacity: 1,000
- President: Nikolai Burdakov
- Manager: David Campaña
- League: Esiliiga
- 2026: Meistriliiga, 10th of 10 (relegated)
- Website: www.fctrans.ee
Home colours	Away colours

Jalgpalliklubi Narva Trans, commonly known as Narva Trans or simply Trans, is an Estonian professional football club based in Narva that competes in the Meistriliiga, the top flight of Estonian football. Although the club's traditional home ground is Kreenholm Stadium, they currently play their home matches at Kalev-Fama Stadium.

The club was founded as Avtomobilist in 1979, changed their name to Autobaas in 1989 and Narva Trans in 1992. Narva Trans were one of the founding members of the Meistriliiga and are one of two clubs which have never been relegated from the Estonian top division since its inception in 1992, along with Flora. Narva Trans have won three Estonian Cups and two Estonian Supercups.

== History ==
The club was founded in 1979 as Avtomobilist by the workers of the Motor Depot 13 in Narva. In 1984, the club was promoted to the Estonian SSR Championship, but was relegated at the end of the season. The club returned to the top division in 1987, but was relegated again after finishing the season last. In 1989, the club changed its name to Autobaas and returned to the top division once again.

In 1992, the club changed the name to Narva Trans and became founding members of the new Meistriliiga, finishing the inaugural season in seventh place. The club earned their first medals after reaching the 1993–94 Estonian Cup final, finishing as runners-up. One year later, Narva Trans earned their first league medals by finishing the 1994–95 league season in third place. The club made their European debut in the 1996 UEFA Intertoto Cup.

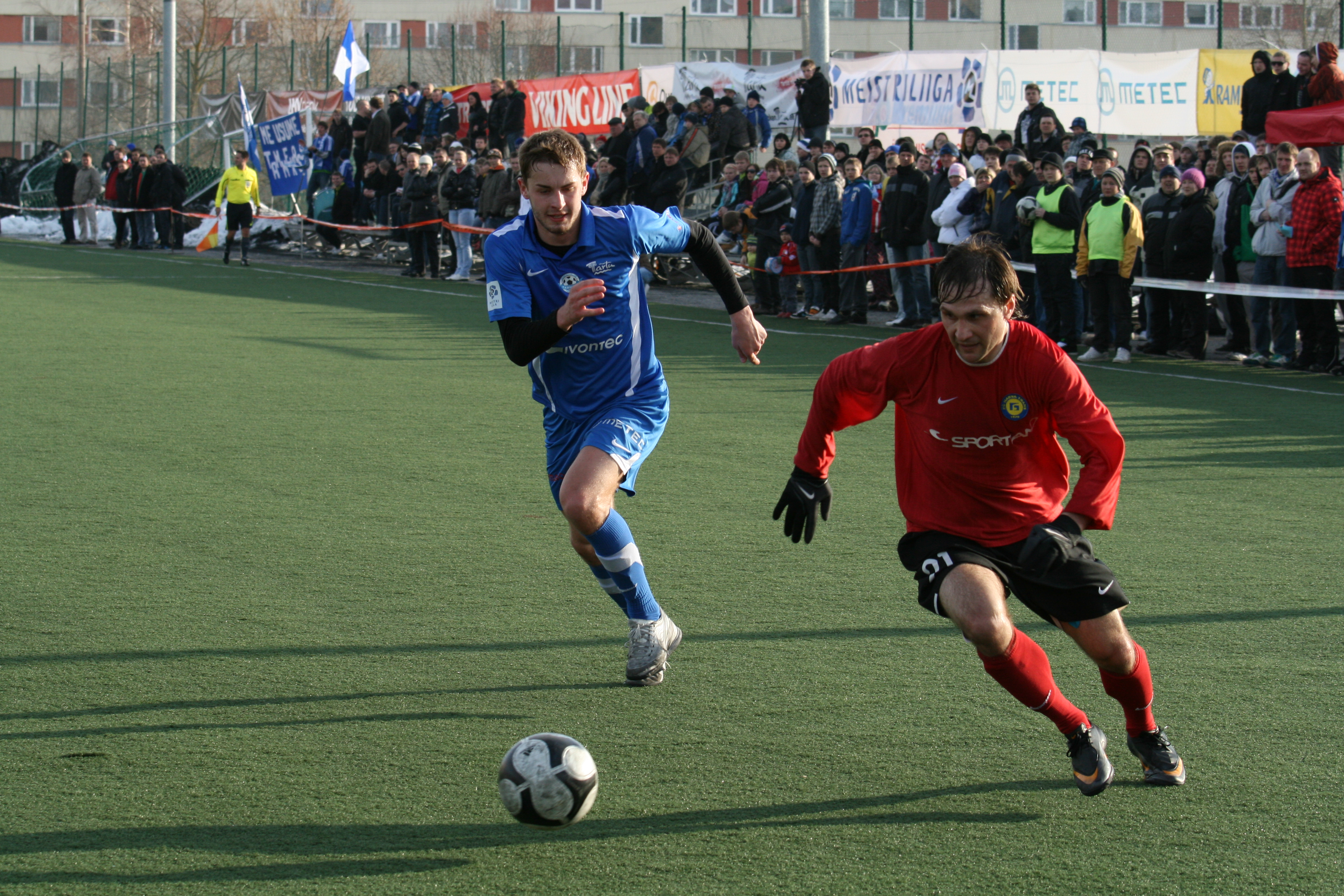
Narva Trans facing Tammeka in 2011

On 24 May 2001, Narva Trans lifted their first trophy by defeating Flora 1–0 in the 2000–01 Estonian Cup final. Narva experienced their most successful period from 2005 to 2011, as the club first came third in the 2005 league season and finished as runners-up in 2006 with club record 83 points, their best league finish to this date. The team won back-to-back Estonian Supercups in 2007 and 2008 by defeating Levadia in both of the finals. Narva Trans finished third for four consecutive seasons in 2008, 2009, 2010 and 2011. In the years that followed, financial competition with the capital city clubs grew more difficult, and Narva Trans gradually transitioned into a mid-table club. Since then, the team has occasionally been referred to as "cup specialists" in recognition of their strong performances in the Estonian Cup competition. The club won their second Estonian Cup trophy in the 2018–19 season, defeating Nõmme Kalju 2–1 after extra time in the final. In 2023, Narva Trans won their third Estonian Cup by defeating FC Flora 2–1 in the 2022–23 final.

== Crest and colours ==
The former crest which was introduced in 1997, featured the logo of Narva Auto AS, the transport enterprise that was the basis on which the football club was founded. The colour scheme reflected the colours of the city's flag - yellow and blue.

The logo of the club was modernised in 2018. The central part of the current crest of Narva Trans features the city's main symbol Narva Hermann Castle, and the logo of Narva Auto AS. The crest carries the club's colours, which are red and blue.

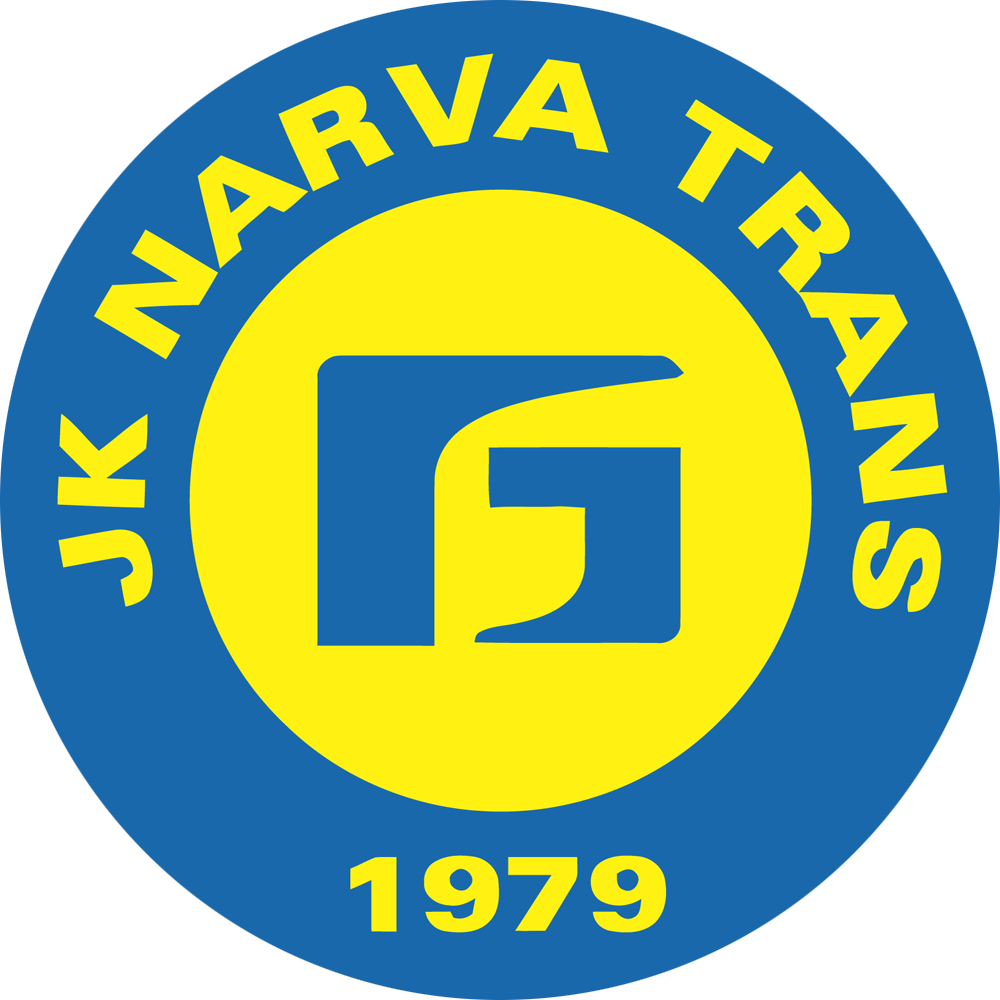
1997–2017

2018–present

== Kit manufacturers and shirt sponsors ==
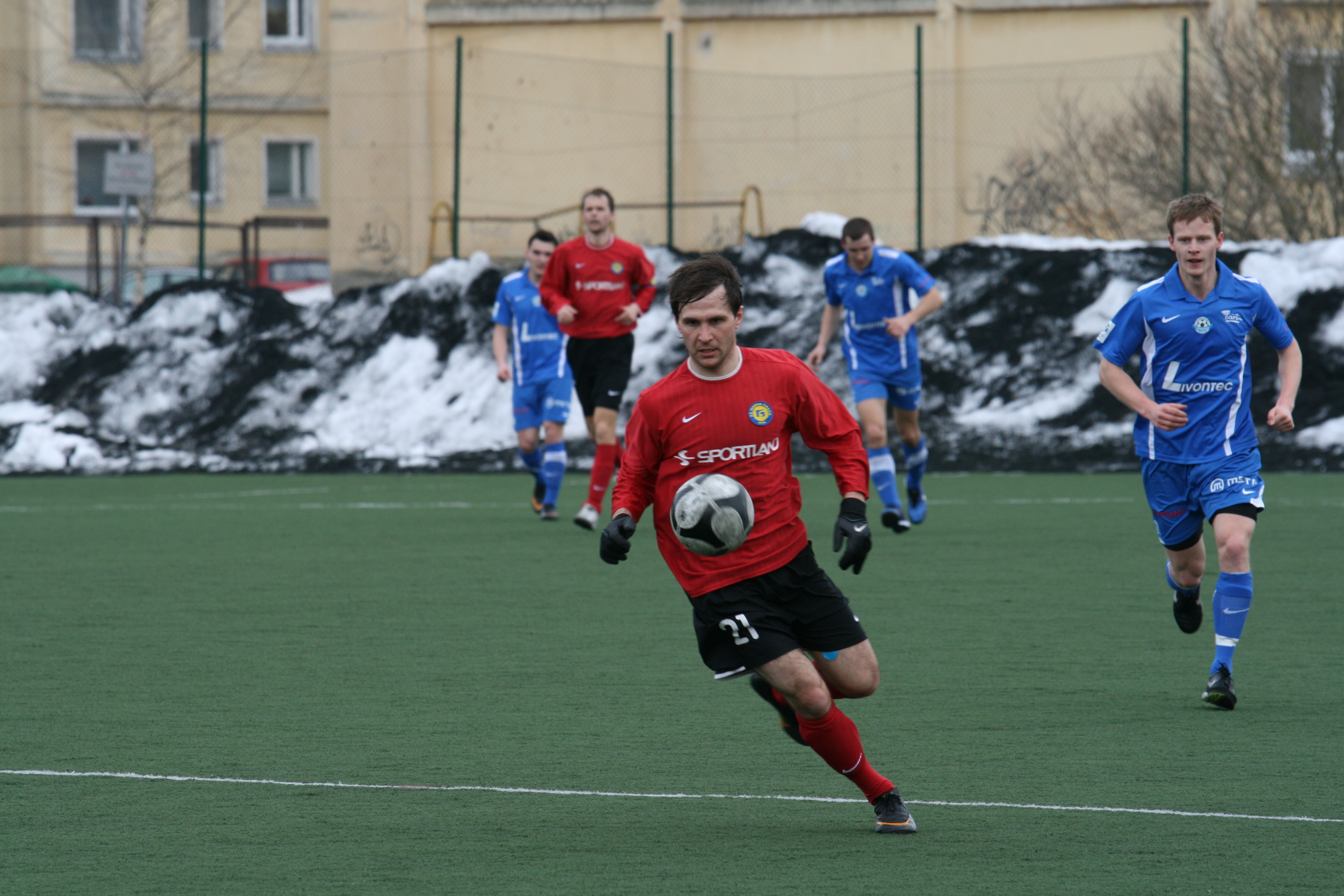
Sportland have been the primary shirt sponsor of Narva Trans for more than two decades.

Period	Kit manufacturer	Shirt sponsor	Ref
2000–2013	Nike	Sportland	
2014–2015	Nike	Fama	
2016–	Nike	Sportland	

== Stadium ==
=== Kreenholm Stadium ===
Kreenholm Stadium has been the home ground of Narva Trans since its founding in 1979. The multi-purpose stadiums seats 1,065. In 2025, the club announced they will play their 2025 season home matches at Narva Kalev-Fama Stadium due to Kreenholm Stadium's poor condition.

=== Kalev-Fama Stadium ===
Since 2025, Narva Trans plays their home matches at the Kalev-Fama artificial turf stadium, having previously used it as their home ground during winter and early spring months. Renovated in 2013 and in 2025, the stadium complex is also the training base of the club.

In 2024, Narva opened an indoor football facility named Narva Jalgpallihall, which serves as the club's training ground during the snowy winter period. With the construction cost of €7 million, it is the most expensive football hall built in Estonia.

== Players ==
=== First-team squad ===
As of 21 August 2026.

Note: Flags indicate national team as defined under FIFA eligibility rules; some limited exceptions apply. Players may hold more than one non-FIFA nationality.

No.	Pos.	Nation	Player
1	GK	EST	Mark Zahharov
2	DF	EST	Valeri Shantenkov
3	DF	ARG	Tomás Berardozzi
4	DF	RUS	Aleksandr Ivanjusin
5	DF	CAN	Cristian Campagna
6	MF	EST	German Šlein
7	MF	AZE	Murad Vəliyev
8	MF	EST	Stanislav Agaptšev
9	FW	TOG	Josué Doké
10	FW	NGR	Ahmad Gero
12	DF	BRA	Eriks Santos
14	DF	EST	Aleksander Filatov
16	DF	EST	Sergei Kondrattsev
17	DF	EST	Artjom Škinjov

No.	Pos.	Nation	Player
19	MF	CIV	Irié
21	MF	EST	Mark Maksimkin (captain)
22	MF	EST	Jegor Žuravljov
23	MF	EST	Aleksandr Jegorov
24	MF	ESP	Yenerey Betancor
27	GK	EST	Daniil Pareiko
28	MF	BRA	Kauã Miranda
29	DF	RUS	Viktor Kudryashov
30	GK	ESP	Iker Venteo
39	MF	RUS	Denis Polyakov
47	FW	EST	Nikita Baljabkin
48	MF	GHA	Wisdom Awusi
70	FW	NGR	Imeh John
88	MF	EST	Arnas Besigirskis

== Club officials ==
=== Current technical staff ===
Position	Name
Manager	(Spain) David Campaña
Assistant coach	(Wales) Noel Patrick Parsons
Goalkeeping coach	(Greece) Leonidas Angelis
Physiotherapists	(Estonia) Vladislav Vesselov
Physiotherapists	(Estonia) Kalju Korstin
Management
President	(Estonia) / (Belarus) Nikolai Burdakov
Chief Executive Officer	(Estonia) Konstantin Burdakov

=== Managerial history ===
Dates	Name
1992–1995	(Estonia) Nikolai Burdakov
1995–1996	(Estonia) Juri Šalamov
1997–1998	(Estonia) Valeri Bondarenko
1998	(Estonia) Sergei Zamorski
1999	(Estonia) Juri Šalamov
1999–2000	(Estonia) Valeri Bondarenko
2001–2002	(Russia) Anatoli Belov
2002	(Russia) Aleksei Yagudin
2002	(Russia) Gennadi Molodov
2003	(Estonia) Sergei Zamogilnõi
2004	(Estonia) Tõnu Eapost
2004	(Russia) Aleksei Yagudin
2004–2008	(Estonia) Valeri Bondarenko
2009	(Estonia) Sergei Ratnikov
2009–2010	(Estonia) Valeri Bondarenko
2011	(Belarus) Yuri Svirkov
2011–2012	(Russia) Aleksei Yagudin
2012	(Russia) Sergei Prikhodko
2012–2013	(Russia) Aleksei Yagudin
2013–2014	(Estonia) Valeri Bondarenko
2014–2015	(Russia) Aleksei Yagudin
2015	(Estonia) Nikolai Toštšev
2015–2018	(Russia) Adyam Kuzyaev
2018	(Turkey) Cenk Özcan
2019	(Latvia) Dmitrijs Kalašņikovs
2019	(Russia) Andrei Syomin
2020	(Turkey) Cenk Özcan
2020	(Estonia) Oleg Kurotškin (interim)
2021	(Russia) Igor Pyvin
2022	(Russia) / (Finland) Alexei Eremenko
2023	(Estonia) Sergei Terehhov
2023–2024	(Russia) / (Finland) Alexei Eremenko
2024	(Portugal) Miguel Moreira
2024	(Portugal) Ricardo Afonso (interim)
2025–2026	(Ukraine) Roman Kozhukhovskyi
2026–present	(Spain) David Campaña

== Honours ==
=== League ===
- Meistriliiga
  - Runners-up (1): 2006

=== Cups ===
- Estonian Cup
  - Winners (3): 2000–01, 2018–19, 2022–23
  - Runners-up (5): 1993–94, 2006–07, 2010–11, 2011–12, 2019–20
- Estonian Supercup
  - Winners (2): 2007, 2008
  - Runners-up (4): 2001, 2012, 2020, 2024

== Seasons and statistics ==
=== Seasons ===
Season	Division	Pos	Pld	W	D	L	GF	GA	GD	Pts	Top goalscorer	Cup	Supercup
1992	Meistriliiga	7	13	4	4	5	23	37	–14	12			
1992–93	Meistriliiga	6	22	11	2	9	51	34	+17	24	(Estonia) Nikolai Toštšev (11)		
1993–94	Meistriliiga	4	22	12	6	4	50	16	+34	30	(Estonia) Nikolai Toštšev (14)	Runners-up	
1994–95	Meistriliiga	3	24	11	6	7	32	24	+8	39	(Estonia) Nikolai Toštšev (7)	Semi-finals	
1995–96	Meistriliiga	5	24	8	6	10	33	32	+1	30	(Estonia) Boriss Nejolov (8)	Quarter-finals	
1996–97	Meistriliiga	6	24	7	6	11	28	38	−10	27	(Estonia) Stanislav Kitto (9)	Semi-finals	
1997–98	Meistriliiga	4	24	9	4	11	27	45	−18	31	(Russia) Dmitri Lipartov (8)	Semi-finals	
1998	Meistriliiga	4	14	6	5	3	28	20	+8	23	(Russia) Dmitri Lipartov (7)		
1999	Meistriliiga	4	28	11	7	10	40	28	+12	40	(Estonia) Maksim Gruznov (13)	Quarter-finals	
2000	Meistriliiga	5	28	12	7	9	64	40	+24	43	(Estonia) Maksim Gruznov (22)	Third round	
2001	Meistriliiga	4	28	16	3	9	79	35	+44	51	(Estonia) Maksim Gruznov (37)	Winners	Runners-up
2002	Meistriliiga	4	28	14	5	9	54	49	+5	47	(Estonia) Maksim Gruznov (24)	Semi-finals	
2003	Meistriliiga	4	28	14	5	9	58	43	+15	47	(Estonia) Maksim Gruznov (16)	Semi-finals	
2004	Meistriliiga	4	28	15	2	11	43	39	+4	47	(Estonia) Maksim Gruznov (9)	Semi-finals	
2005	Meistriliiga	3	36	23	6	7	99	34	+65	75	(Estonia) Maksim Gruznov (26)	Semi-finals	
2006	Meistriliiga	2	36	25	8	3	106	36	+70	83	(Estonia) Maksim Gruznov (31)	Semi-finals	
2007	Meistriliiga	4	36	25	3	8	89	28	+61	78	(Russia) Dmitri Lipartov (30)	Runners-up	Winners
2008	Meistriliiga	3	36	16	8	12	62	54	+8	56	(Estonia) Nikolai Lõsanov (13)	Quarter-finals	Winners
2009	Meistriliiga	3	36	23	7	6	82	29	+53	76	(Estonia) Aleksandr Tarassenkov (13)	Semi-finals	
2010	Meistriliiga	3	36	23	7	6	67	31	+36	76	(Lithuania) Marius Bezykornovas (13)	Fourth round	
2011	Meistriliiga	3	36	22	7	7	107	29	+78	73	(Latvia) Aleksandrs Čekulajevs (46)	Runners-up	
2012	Meistriliiga	4	36	16	7	13	52	44	+8	55	(Russia) Vladislav Ivanov (13)	Runners-up	Runners-up
2013	Meistriliiga	7	36	11	3	22	39	55	−16	36	(Estonia) Albert Taar (7)	Semi-finals	
2014	Meistriliiga	8	36	6	10	20	37	79	−42	28	(Estonia) Viktor Plotnikov (9)	Third round	
2015	Meistriliiga	6	36	14	7	15	50	46	+4	49	(Latvia) Vitālijs Ziļs (13)	First round	
2016	Meistriliiga	8	36	11	8	17	60	68	−8	41	(Russia) Dmitri Proshin (14)	Third round	
2017	Meistriliiga	5	36	13	6	17	46	63	−17	45	(Belarus) Dzmitry Kowb (10)	Second round	
2018	Meistriliiga	4	36	18	7	11	76	57	+19	61	(Russia) Dmitri Barkov (17)	Semi-finals	
2019	Meistriliiga	6	36	13	9	14	57	49	+8	48	(United States) Eric McWoods (13)	Winners	
2020	Meistriliiga	8	30	6	7	17	31	49	−18	25	(Russia) Aleksandr Zakarliuka (8)	Runners-up	Runners-up
2021	Meistriliiga	6	32	9	6	17	36	61	−25	33	(Russia) Aleksandr Zakarliuka (10)	Semi-finals	
2022	Meistriliiga	7	36	10	8	18	43	58	−15	38	(Ukraine) Denys Dedechko (12)	Semi-finals	
2023	Meistriliiga	8	36	12	2	22	32	64	−32	38	(Estonia) Tristan Koskor (16)	Winners	
2024	Meistriliiga	6	36	10	12	14	48	63	−15	42	(Burkina Faso) Pierre Landry Kaboré (Georgia (country)) Sergo Kukhianidze (11)	Fourth round	Runners-up
2025	Meistriliiga	5	36	15	6	15	53	52	+1	51	(Burkina Faso) Pierre Landry Kaboré (12)	Semi-finals	

=== Europe ===
Season	Competition	Round	Opponent	Home	Away	Agg.
1996	UEFA Intertoto Cup	Group stage	(Netherlands) FC Groningen	1–4	–	–
1996	UEFA Intertoto Cup	Group stage	(Hungary) Vasas	–	1–4	–
1996	UEFA Intertoto Cup	Group stage	(Belgium) Lierse	0–3	–	–
1996	UEFA Intertoto Cup	Group stage	(Turkey) Gaziantepspor	–	0–0	–
1999	UEFA Intertoto Cup	First round	(Finland) Jokerit	1–4	0–3	1–7
2000	UEFA Intertoto Cup	First round	(Romania) Ceahlăul Piatra Neamţ	2–5	2–4	4–9
2001–02	UEFA Cup	Qualifying round	(Sweden) IF Elfsborg	3–0	0–5	3–5
2003	UEFA Intertoto Cup	First round	(Serbia and Montenegro) OFK Beograd	3–5	1–6	4–11
2004	UEFA Intertoto Cup	First round	(Lithuania) Vėtra	0–1	0–3	0–4
2005	UEFA Intertoto Cup	First round	(Belgium) Lokeren	0–2	1–0	1–2
2006	UEFA Intertoto Cup	First round	(Sweden) Kalmar FF	1–6	0–2	1–8
2007–08	UEFA Cup	First qualifying round	(Sweden) Helsingborgs IF	0–3	0–6	0–9
2008	UEFA Intertoto Cup	First round	(Lithuania) Ekranas	0–3	0–1	0–4
2009–10	UEFA Europa League	First qualifying round	(Slovenia) Rudar Velenje	0–3	1–3	1–6
2010–11	UEFA Europa League	First qualifying round	(Finland) MYPA	0–2	0–5	0–7
2011–12	UEFA Europa League	First qualifying round	(North Macedonia) Rabotnički	1–4	0–3	1–7
2012–13	UEFA Europa League	First qualifying round	(Azerbaijan) Inter Baku	0–5	0–2	0–7
2013–14	UEFA Europa League	First qualifying round	(Sweden) Gefle IF	0–3	1–5	1–8
2018–19	UEFA Europa League	First qualifying round	(Bosnia and Herzegovina) Željezničar	0–2	1–3	1–5
2019–20	UEFA Europa League	First qualifying round	(Montenegro) Budućnost Podgorica	0–2	1–4	1–6
2023–24	UEFA Europa Conference League	First qualifying round	(Armenia) Pyunik	0–3	0–2	0–5

1. UEFA awarded Narva Trans a 3–0 win due to IF Elfsborg fielding a suspended player.
