= JK Tallinna Sadam =

Estonian football club

Sadam Tallinn
- Full name: Jalgpalliklubi Tallinna Sadam
- Founded: 1991
- Dissolved: 1999
- Ground: Kalevi Keskstaadion, Tallinn
- Capacity: 12,000
- League: Meistriliiga
- 1998: 2nd
Home colours	Away colours

Jalgpalliklubi Tallinna Sadam (Port of Tallinn Football Club) was an Estonian football club that existed from 1991 until 1998. The club won the Estonian Cup in 1996 and 1997 and were Estonian Meistriliiga runners up in 1997–98 and 1998 seasons. Before the 1999 season, Sadam merged with Levadia Maardu, under the name of Levadia Maardu (Levadia Tallinn since 2004).

== Achievements ==
- Estonian Cup: (2)

1995–96, 1996–97

- Estonian SuperCup: (1)

1996

== Tallinna Sadam in Estonian Football ==
Year	League	Position	Goals +/-	Points
1992	III	2	+ 1	4
92/93	II	2	+38	26
93/94	I	5	+12	25
94/95	I	4	+18	25
95/96	I	4	+ 7	21
96/97	I	3	+ 4	24
97/98	I	2	+27	31
1998	I	2	+38	34

== Tallinna Sadam in Europe ==
- 1Q = 1st Qualifying Round
- 2Q = 2nd Qualifying Round

Season	Cup	Round	Country	Club	Home	Away	Agg.
1996/97	Cup Winners' Cup	1Q	(Ukraine)	FC Nyva Vinnytsia	2–1	0–1	2–2 (a)
1997/98	Cup Winners' Cup	1Q	(Belarus)	Belshina Bobruisk	1–1	1–4	2–5
1998/99	UEFA Cup	1Q	(Poland)	Polonia Warszawa	0–2	1–3	1–5
