= FC TVMK =

Estonian football club

- Full name: Football Club Tallinna Vineeri- ja Mööblikombinaat
- Nickname: Fanera
- Founded: 1951
- Dissolved: 2008
- Ground: Kadriorg Stadium, Tallinn
- Capacity: 4,750
- Chairman: Pjotr Sedin
Home colours	Away colours

FC TVMK was an Estonian football club. TVMK won the Estonian Meistriliiga in 2005. They are also multiple winners of the Estonian Cup.

== History ==
Founded in 1951, TVMK played in regional leagues until 1986, when the club entered the "Jõgeva III division", winning promotion to the II liiga the same year. In 1988 TVMK reached the top flight of 1988 Estonian SSR Football Championship, that was not directly affiliated with Soviet Union football league system where Estonia was represented by SK Tallinna Sport and JK Tallinna Kalev. TVMK won the Estonian SSR

TVMK won two of the final seasons of the Estonian SSR Football Championship in 1990 and 1991 subsequently becoming one of the founding members of Estonian Meistriliiga as TVMV when the independent championship was first held in 1992, following the Soviet occupation.

Financial difficulties at TVMV parent company - the TVMV plywood-producing factory (known as TVMK for most of its history) put the club's existence at risk following the 1992 season. The club was saved by sponsorship investments from the transport company Nikol AS.

Due to sponsorship reasons, TVMK played both the 1992-93 and 1993-94 seasons under the name of FC Nikol, securing Meistriliiga bronze medals on both occasions.

One game before the end of the 1993-94 season, newly-formed FC Tevalte was disqualified from Meistriliiga on match fixing allegations. Tevalte owner, Sergei Belov, filed a complaint against disqualification, but ultimately established a new club based on FC Nikol. The new club was named FC Lantana-Marlekor, where Marlekor was referring to the company that privatised the TVMK factory, a business with which FC TVMK was affiliated.

Despite using FC Nikol's Meistriliiga license and referencing TVMK owners Marlekor AS in their name, Lantana-Marlekor was mostly formed out of former FC Tevalte players and was coached by Sergei Belov's father, who had also coached FC Tevalte the season earlier. Most of the TVMK/Nikol players, including player-coach Vjatseslav Smirnov, left the club during this transition.

In the subsequent season, following Belov's successful appeal to FIFA, the Estonian Football Association (EJL) reinstated FC Tevalte back to Meistriliiga. Since Sergei Belov was already operating his club under a new license and name, the slot regained by FC Tevalte was passed to AS Marlekor, effectively returning FC TVMK's successors to Meistriliiga. Marlekor used Tevalte's Meistriliiga license, and the team played the 1995-96 Meistriliiga season as Tevalte-Marlekor. Meanwhile, Lantana dropped the reference to Marlekor from their name. The return of TVMK's successors to Meistriliiga saw many former TVMK/Nikol players, including player-coach Vjatseslav Smirnov, rejoin the team.

Tevalte-Marlekor finished the 1995–96 season in third place, level on point with FC Flora and six point behind FC Lantana. The following season Tevalte was dropped from the club's name and the team continued under the name of Marlekor.

Ahead of the 1997-98 season, the club regained its historic name, FC TVMK. TVMK achieved limited success between 1997 and 1999, finishing either fifth or sixth in Meistriliiga. It was not until 2000 that TVMK secured Meistriliiga bronze medals. Subsequently, TVMK consistently won either silver or bronze during the five Meistriliiga seasons between 2000 and 2004, culminating in their first and last Meistriliiga championship in 2005.

=== After the title ===
After winning the title TVMK lost several key players to other clubs in the pre-season. Club top scorers Ingemar Teever and Tarmo Neemelo left to Sweden (although the latter would later return on loan, after a troubled start abroad), Maksim Smirnov and Deniss Malov left for rivals FC Levadia, Egidijus Juška returned to Lithuania. Vyacheslav Bulavin continued as the head coach, but was sacked in mid-season, with the former Russia international Sergei Yuran taking over. The fortunes didn't change much though, and the highlights of the season were winning the Estonian Cup and Estonian Super Cup, as the club finished only fourth in the league. The following season Yuran left for Shinnik Yaroslavl. Vjatšeslav Smirnov took over and led the team to a third-place finish in the league. After the 2007 season Pjotr Sedin, the chairman, announced that the club is currently considering a possibility of giving up their professional status, because of financial difficulties.

FC TVMK licence was revoked following the 2007 season.

=== Name History ===
- TVMK (1951–1991)
- TVMV (1991)
- FC Nikol (1992–1994)
- Tevalte-Marlekor (1995–1996)
- FC Marlekor (1996–1997)
- TVMK (1997–2008)

== Achievements ==
- Meistriliiga
  - Champions (1): 2005
- Estonian Cup
  - Winners (2): 2002–03, 2005–06
- Estonian SuperCup
  - Winners (2): 2005, 2006

== UEFA club competition results ==
As of 1 August 2008

Competition	Matches	W	D	L	GF	GA
UEFA Champions League	2	0	1	1	3	4
UEFA Cup	10	0	2	8	6	25
UEFA Cup Winners' Cup	2	0	0	2	1	8
UEFA Intertoto Cup	4	0	1	3	2	9
Total	18	0	4	14	12	46

- 1Q = 1st Qualifying Round

Season	Cup	Round	Country	Club	Home	Away	Agg.
1993/94	Cup Winners' Cup	1Q	(Norway)	Lillestrøm SK	0–4	1–4	1–8
2001	Intertoto Cup	1Q	(Israel)	Hapoel Haifa	0–3	0–2	0–5
2002/03	UEFA Cup	1Q	(Georgia (country))	Dinamo Tbilisi	0–1	1–4	1–5
2003/04	UEFA Cup	1Q	(Denmark)	Odense BK	0–3	1–1	1–4
2004/05	UEFA Cup	1Q	(Iceland)	ÍA Akranes	1–2	2–4	3–6
2005/06	UEFA Cup	1Q	(Finland)	MyPa	1–1	0–1	1–2
2006/07	Champions League	1Q	(Iceland)	FH Hafnarfjörður	2–3	1–1	3–4
2007	Intertoto Cup	1R	(Finland)	FC Honka	2–4	0–0	2–4
2008/09	UEFA Cup	1Q	(Denmark)	FC Nordsjælland	0–3	0–5	0–8
