= List of Estonian football transfers winter 2014–15 =

This is a list of Estonian football transfers in the winter transfer window 2014–15 by club. Only transfers in Meistriliiga are included.

== Meistriliiga ==
=== Levadia Tallinn ===
In:

No.	Pos.	Nation	Player
2	DF	(Estonia) EST	Hindrek Ojamaa (from Tammeka Tartu)
3	DF	(Belarus) BLR	Artsyom Rakhmanaw (from Neman Grodno)
4	DF	(Finland) FIN	Juuso Laitinen (from Jazz)
7	MF	(Estonia) EST	Maksim Lipin (from Infonet Tallinn)
12	GK	(Russia) RUS	Aleksei Shirokov (free agent)
17	MF	(Estonia) EST	Siim Luts (free agent)
25	FW	(Estonia) EST	Kaimar Saag (from Assyriska)
29	DF	(Estonia) EST	Taavi Rähn (from Flora Tallinn)
35	GK	(Estonia) EST	Sergei Pareiko (free agent)
38	DF	(Slovakia) SVK	Ivan Pecha (from Oțelul Galați)

Out:

No.	Pos.	Nation	Player
1	GK	(Ukraine) UKR	Roman Smishko (to Narva Trans)
2	MF	(Croatia) CRO	Jan Penić
3	DF	(Estonia) EST	Artjom Artjunin (to Brașov)
10	FW	(Estonia) EST	Igor Subbotin (to Mladá Boleslav)
14	GK	(Estonia) EST	Kristjan Tamme (on loan to Pärnu Linnameeskond)
16	MF	(Estonia) EST	Heiko Tamm (to Tammeka Tartu)
17	DF	(Estonia) EST	Maksim Podholjuzin (released)
18	DF	(Austria) AUT	Toni Tipurić (to Zlaté Moravce)
19	MF	(Estonia) EST	Aleksandr Dmitrijev (to Infonet Tallinn)
21	DF	(Estonia) EST	Madis Vihmann (to Flora Tallinn)
23	MF	(Estonia) EST	Marek Kaljumäe (to Narva Trans)
28	FW	(Estonia) EST	Kristen Saarts (on loan to Pärnu Linnameeskond)
33	MF	(Serbia) SRB	Dragomir Vukobratović (to Osijek)

=== Sillamäe Kalev ===
In:

No.	Pos.	Nation	Player
3	DF	(Lithuania) LTU	Marius Činikas (from Sūduva Marijampolė)
4	DF	(Estonia) EST	Aleksandr Ivanjušin (from Järve Kohtla-Järve)
11	MF	(Estonia) EST	Janar Toomet (from Nõmme Kalju)
35	GK	(Russia) RUS	Artyom Levizi (loan return from Tallinna Kalev)
70	MF	(Lithuania) LTU	Rytis Leliūga (from Žalgiris Vilnius)
77	DF	(Estonia) EST	Tihhon Šišov (from Nõmme Kalju)
89	MF	(Estonia) EST	Viktor Plotnikov (from Narva Trans)
—	MF	(Italy) ITA	Giorgio Di Vicino (free agent)
—	MF	(Lithuania) LTU	Darius Miceika (from Trakai)

Out:

No.	Pos.	Nation	Player
7	DF	(Estonia) EST	Aleksandr Volodin (to Infonet Tallinn)
8	MF	(Spain) ESP	Micha (to Pinatar)
9	FW	(Estonia) EST	Vjatšeslav Zahovaiko (to Paide Linnameeskond)
11	MF	(Russia) RUS	Nikolai Mashichev (to Infonet Tallinn)
16	GK	(Estonia) EST	Mihhail Lavrentjev (to Infonet Tallinn)
33	MF	(Russia) RUS	Stanislav Murikhin (to Volgar Astrakhan)
99	FW	(Russia) RUS	Yevgeni Kabaev (to Persija Jakarta)
—	MF	(Italy) ITA	Giorgio Di Vicino

=== Flora Tallinn ===
In:

No.	Pos.	Nation	Player
2	DF	(Estonia) EST	Enar Jääger (free agent)
19	DF	(Estonia) EST	Gert Kams (from SJK)
21	DF	(Estonia) EST	Madis Vihmann (from Levadia Tallinn)
29	FW	(Finland) FIN	Sakari Tukiainen (from Atlantis)
33	GK	(Estonia) EST	Richard Aland (from Nõmme Kalju)
57	MF	(Estonia) EST	Mihkel Ainsalu (from Nõmme Kalju)

Out:

No.	Pos.	Nation	Player
2	FW	(Estonia) EST	Sander Post (to Tulevik Viljandi)
6	DF	(Estonia) EST	Karol Mets (to Viking)
15	DF	(Estonia) EST	Erkki Junolainen (to Nõmme Kalju)
21	MF	(Estonia) EST	Sergei Mošnikov (to Tobol Kostanay)
24	DF	(Estonia) EST	Gerdo Juhkam (on loan to Tulevik Viljandi)
29	DF	(Estonia) EST	Taavi Rähn (to Levadia Tallinn)
33	GK	(Estonia) EST	Stanislav Prins (released)
—	DF	(Estonia) EST	Raio Piiroja (to Pärnu Linnameeskond)

=== Nõmme Kalju ===
In:

No.	Pos.	Nation	Player
8	MF	(Estonia) EST	Artjom Dmitrijev (from Infonet Tallinn)
9	MF	(Estonia) EST	Ats Purje (from KuPS)
11	FW	(Estonia) EST	Vladimir Voskoboinikov (loan return from Qingdao Hainiu)
19	MF	(Estonia) EST	Erkki Junolainen (from Flora Tallinn)
20	MF	(Estonia) EST	Joel Lindpere (from Baník Ostrava)
69	GK	(Estonia) EST	Siim-Sten Palm (from Paide Linnameeskond)

Out:

No.	Pos.	Nation	Player
4	DF	(Estonia) EST	Mikk Reintam
9	FW	(Italy) ITA	Damiano Quintieri
13	MF	(Estonia) EST	Martin Vunk (to Persija Jakarta)
15	FW	(Estonia) EST	Jüri Jevdokimov (to Infonet Tallinn)
17	FW	(Estonia) EST	Robert Kirss (on loan to Pärnu Linnameeskond)
19	MF	(Estonia) EST	Janar Toomet (to Sillamäe Kalev)
20	MF	(Brazil) BRA	Fabinho
21	FW	(Brazil) BRA	Felipe Nunes
23	MF	(Estonia) EST	Mihkel Ainsalu (to Flora Tallinn)
32	FW	(Estonia) EST	Jarmo Ahjupera (to Tulevik Viljandi)
69	GK	(Estonia) EST	Richard Aland (to Flora Tallinn)
77	DF	(Estonia) EST	Tihhon Šišov (to Sillamäe Kalev)

=== Infonet Tallinn ===
In:

No.	Pos.	Nation	Player
7	DF	(Estonia) EST	Aleksandr Volodin (from Sillamäe Kalev)
11	FW	(Estonia) EST	Jüri Jevdokimov (from Nõmme Kalju)
13	MF	(Russia) RUS	Nikolai Mashichev (from Sillamäe Kalev)
14	FW	(Sweden) SWE	Ermal Hajdari (free agent)
16	GK	(Estonia) EST	Mihhail Lavrentjev (from Sillamäe Kalev)
20	MF	(Estonia) EST	Pavel Dõmov (from Legion Tallinn)
27	MF	(Estonia) EST	Aleksandr Dmitrijev (from Levadia Tallinn)
24	FW	(Latvia) LVA	Vladislavs Kozlovs (from Jelgava)
—	FW	(Russia) RUS	Vladislav Ivanov (free agent)

Out:

No.	Pos.	Nation	Player
7	MF	(Estonia) EST	Edgar Tur
11	FW	(Ivory Coast) CIV	Manucho (to USM Alger)
14	MF	(Estonia) EST	Nikita Martõnov (to Paide Linnameeskond)
17	MF	(Russia) RUS	Oleg Valov
20	MF	(Estonia) EST	Maksim Lipin (to Levadia Tallinn)
21	FW	(Estonia) EST	Marten Saarlas
24	MF	(Estonia) EST	Albert Taar (released)
27	MF	(Estonia) EST	Artjom Dmitrijev (to Nõmme Kalju)
38	MF	(Estonia) EST	Konstantin Nahk (retired)
69	GK	(Estonia) EST	Ilja Kassjantšuk (to Starbunker Maardu)
77	MF	(Russia) RUS	Vladimir Malinin
—	FW	(Russia) RUS	Vladislav Ivanov (to Mashʼal Mubarek)

=== Paide Linnameeskond ===
In:

No.	Pos.	Nation	Player
6	MF	(Estonia) EST	Nikita Martõnov (from Infonet Tallinn)
11	MF	(Estonia) EST	Meelis Peitre (free agent)
12	GK	(Estonia) EST	Andrus Lukjanov (from Tammeka Tartu)
20	MF	(Estonia) EST	Ats Sillaste (from Loo)
21	FW	(Estonia) EST	Vjatšeslav Zahovaiko (from Sillamäe Kalev)
26	DF	(Estonia) EST	Greeg Jakobson (from Tallinna Ülikool)
34	DF	(Estonia) EST	Edgars Butlers (from Tallinna Kalev)
—	MF	(Estonia) EST	Lauri Välja (from M.C. Tallinn)
—	MF	(Estonia) EST	Raido Leokin (from Keila)
—	MF	(Estonia) EST	Michael Lilander (from Nõmme United)
—	FW	(Estonia) EST	Roman Sirotkin (from Legion Tallinn)

Out:

No.	Pos.	Nation	Player
4	DF	(Estonia) EST	Joel Indermitte (to Atarfe Industrial)
10	MF	(Estonia) EST	Stanislav Goldberg (to Box Hill United)
12	GK	(Estonia) EST	Siim-Sten Palm (to Nõmme Kalju)
22	DF	(Estonia) EST	Dmitri Kovtunovitš
24	DF	(Estonia) EST	Karl Palatu (to Pärnu Linnameeskond)
34	FW	(Estonia) EST	Marten Mütt (released)
77	MF	(Estonia) EST	Karl Johann Reitalu

=== Tammeka Tartu ===
In:

No.	Pos.	Nation	Player
20	MF	(Estonia) EST	Heiko Tamm (from Levadia Tallinn)
27	MF	(Estonia) EST	Ergo Eessaar (from EMÜ)
—	MF	(Estonia) EST	Janno Saks (from Kiviõli Irbis)
—	FW	(Estonia) EST	Kristjan Moks (from Võru)

Out:

No.	Pos.	Nation	Player
2	DF	(Estonia) EST	Hindrek Ojamaa (to Levadia Tallinn)
3	DF	(Estonia) EST	Simo Tenno
5	DF	(Estonia) EST	Tanel Joosep
7	MF	(Estonia) EST	Priit Peedo
9	FW	(Estonia) EST	Mikk Valtna (to Welco Elekter Tartu)
11	FW	(Estonia) EST	Georgi Ivanov
12	GK	(Estonia) EST	Andrus Lukjanov (to Paide Linnameeskond)
14	FW	(Estonia) EST	Mario Tikerberi (to Noorus 96 Jõgeva)
21	FW	(Estonia) EST	Marek Naal
25	MF	(Estonia) EST	Mario Hansi (retired)
28	DF	(Estonia) EST	Rauno Tutk (to Pärnu Linnameeskond)
—	FW	(Estonia) EST	Paul Naaber

=== Narva Trans ===
In:

No.	Pos.	Nation	Player
1	GK	(Ukraine) UKR	Roman Smishko (from Levadia Tallinn)
8	MF	(Estonia) EST	Marek Kaljumäe (from Levadia Tallinn)
9	FW	(Ukraine) UKR	Volodymyr Kilikevych (free agent)
12	FW	(Latvia) LVA	Vitālijs Ziļs (from Daugava Rīga)
14	MF	(Russia) RUS	Roman Protasov (free agent)
20	DF	(Ivory Coast) CIV	Akès da Costa Goore (free agent)
21	DF	(Estonia) EST	Aleksei Jahhimovitš (free agent)
23	FW	(Russia) RUS	Dmitri Barkov (from Kaluga)

Out:

No.	Pos.	Nation	Player
7	MF	(Russia) RUS	Vitali Kutuzov (to Järve Kohtla-Järve)
11	MF	(Russia) RUS	Ilya Osipov
14	MF	(Estonia) EST	Viktor Plotnikov (to Sillamäe Kalev)
15	MF	(Estonia) EST	Stanislav Kitto (to Järve Kohtla-Järve)
17	DF	(Russia) RUS	Dmitri Shevyakov
20	DF	(Ivory Coast) CIV	Akès da Costa Goore
20	MF	(Latvia) LVA	Andrejs Siņicins (to METTA)
21	MF	(Russia) RUS	Ignat Yepifanov
33	GK	(Estonia) EST	Nikita Tokaitšuk (retired)

=== Pärnu Linnameeskond ===
In:

No.	Pos.	Nation	Player
2	MF	(Estonia) EST	Chris Anderson (from Vaprus Vändra)
9	FW	(Estonia) EST	Kristen Saarts (on loan from Levadia Tallinn)
10	MF	(Estonia) EST	Ander Paabut (from Vaprus Vändra)
12	MF	(Estonia) EST	Rauno Tutk (from Tammeka Tartu)
16	MF	(Estonia) EST	Greger Könninge (from Vaprus Vändra)
17	MF	(Estonia) EST	Albert Anissimov (from Tallinna Kalev)
22	FW	(Estonia) EST	Robert Kirss (on loan from Nõmme Kalju)
24	DF	(Estonia) EST	Karl Palatu (from Paide Linnameeskond)
37	MF	(Estonia) EST	Hevar Aas (from Metropool Pärnu)
—	GK	(Estonia) EST	Kristjan Tamme (on loan from Levadia Tallinn)
—	DF	(Estonia) EST	Raio Piiroja (from Flora Tallinn)

Out:

No.	Pos.	Nation	Player
5	DF	(Estonia) EST	Andro Aavik
12	DF	(Estonia) EST	Markus Sabiin
16	MF	(Estonia) EST	Alder Lepik
23	DF	(Estonia) EST	Margus Põldsaar (to Flora III Tallinn)
27	MF	(Estonia) EST	Ott Midenbritt (to Vaprus Vändra)
—	DF	(Estonia) EST	Gert Olesk (retired)

=== Tulevik Viljandi ===
In:

No.	Pos.	Nation	Player
5	DF	(Estonia) EST	Sander Post (from Flora Tallinn)
9	FW	(Estonia) EST	Joonas Tamm (from Trelleborg)
12	GK	(Estonia) EST	Martti Poulakainen (from Viikingit)
19	MF	(Estonia) EST	Erkki Kubber (on loan from Flora II Tallinn)
24	DF	(Estonia) EST	Gerdo Juhkam (on loan from Flora Tallinn)
32	FW	(Estonia) EST	Jarmo Ahjupera (from Nõmme Kalju)
39	MF	(Estonia) EST	Mikk Miländer (free agent)
41	MF	(Estonia) EST	Karl Ivar Maar (on loan from Flora II Tallinn)
45	MF	(Estonia) EST	Sander Kapper (from Myllypuro)
77	DF	(Estonia) EST	Ragnar Piir (on loan from Flora II Tallinn)

Out:

No.	Pos.	Nation	Player
19	MF	(Estonia) EST	Jorma Kiigemägi
20	FW	(Estonia) EST	Rasmus Luhakooder
22	MF	(Estonia) EST	Mikk Metsa
32	GK	(Estonia) EST	Rain Vessenberg

== See also ==
- 2015 Meistriliiga
