= 2016 Meistriliiga =

Estonian national championships in football

Meistriliiga
- Season: 2016
- Champions: Infonet (1st title)
- Relegated: Tarvas
- Champions League: Infonet
- Europa League: Levadia; Nõmme Kalju; Flora
- Matches: 180
- Goals: 582 (3.23 per match)
- Top goalscorer: Yevgeni Kabaev (25 goals)
- Best goalkeeper: Sergei Lepmets (18 clean sheets)
- Biggest home win: Paide 7–0 Tarvas (23 August 2016)
- Biggest away win: Tarvas 0–6 Trans (1 October 2016); Pärnu 1–7 Trans (29 October 2016)
- Highest scoring: Levadia 7–1 Paide (24 July 2016); Pärnu 1–7 Trans (29 October 2016)
- Longest winning run: 10 matches Infonet
- Longest unbeaten run: 14 matches Infonet
- Longest winless run: 36 matches Tarvas
- Longest losing run: 16 matches Tarvas

The 2016 Meistriliiga (known as A. Le Coq Premium Liiga for sponsorship reasons) was the 26th season of the Meistriliiga, the highest division of Estonian football system. The season began on 4 March 2016 and concluded on 5 November 2016.

Infonet won the league on the last matchday of the season, finishing with 80 points. It was their first league title.

== Teams ==
A total of 10 teams played in the league. These included 9 teams from the 2015 season and one promoted team from the 2015 Esiliiga: Tarvas, making their debut in the top flight. Tarvas replaced Tulevik who were relegated out of the Meistriliiga after a single season. In the relegation play-off Tammeka successfully defended their league spot by defeating challengers Tallinna Kalev.

=== Stadia ===
Location of the 2016 Meistriliiga teams

Team	Location	Stadium	Seating capacity
Flora	Tallinn	A. Le Coq Arena	9,692
Infonet	Tallinn	Infonet Lasnamäe Stadium	400
Levadia	Tallinn	Kadriorg Stadium	5,000
Narva Trans	Narva	Kreenholm Stadium	1,065
Nõmme Kalju	Tallinn	Hiiu Stadium	300
Paide Linnameeskond	Paide	Paide linnastaadion	268
Pärnu Linnameeskond	Pärnu	Pärnu Rannastaadion	1,501
Sillamäe Kalev	Sillamäe	Sillamäe Kalev Stadium	800
Tammeka	Tartu	Tamme Stadium	1,750
Tarvas	Rakvere	Rakvere linnastaadion	1,785

=== Personnel and kits ===
Note: Flags indicate national team as has been defined under FIFA eligibility rules. Players and Managers may hold more than one non-FIFA nationality.

Team	Manager	Captain	Kit manufacturer	Shirt sponsor
Flora	(Estonia) Argo Arbeiter	(Estonia) Gert Kams	Nike	Tele2
Infonet	(Estonia) Aleksandr Puštov	(Estonia) Andrei Kalimullin	Joma	Infonet
Levadia	(Estonia) Igor Prins	(Estonia) Rimo Hunt	Adidas	Viimsi Keevitus
Narva Trans	(Russia) Adyam Kuzyaev	(Estonia) Roman Nesterovski	Nike	Sportland
Nõmme Kalju	(Russia) Sergei Frantsev	(Estonia) Vitali Teleš	Adidas	Optibet
Paide Linnameeskond	(Estonia) Meelis Rooba	(Estonia) Lauri Varendi	Nike	Enemat
Pärnu Linnameeskond	(Estonia) Marko Lelov	(Estonia) Karl Palatu	Hummel	Wendre
Sillamäe Kalev	(Lithuania) Algimantas Briaunys (Ukraine) Vadym Dobizha	(Estonia) Mihhail Starodubtsev	Uhlsport	Alexela
Tammeka	(Estonia) Indrek Koser	(Estonia) Kaarel Kiidron	Nike	Sportland
Tarvas	(Estonia) Urmas Kirs	(Estonia) Kaarel Saar	Nike	Aqva Hotel & Spa

=== Managerial changes ===
Team	Outgoing manager	Manner of departure	Date of vacancy	Position in table	Replaced by	Date of appointment
Levadia	(Estonia) Marko Kristal	Sacked	7 November 2015	Pre-season	(Estonia) Sergei Ratnikov	7 November 2015
Nõmme Kalju	(Brazil) Getúlio Fredo	Caretaker spell over	7 November 2015	Pre-season	(Russia) Sergei Frantsev	7 November 2015
Sillamäe Kalev	(Russia) Denis Ugarov	Sacked	24 May 2016	8th	(Lithuania) Algimantas Briaunys (caretaker) (Ukraine) Vadym Dobizha (caretaker)	24 May 2016
Tarvas	(Estonia) Valeri Bondarenko	Sacked	4 June 2016	10th	(Estonia) Urmas Kirs	4 June 2016
Flora	(Estonia) Norbert Hurt	Resigned	8 July 2016	4th	(Estonia) Jürgen Henn (caretaker)	8 July 2016
Levadia	(Estonia) Sergei Ratnikov	Sacked	11 July 2016	2nd	(Estonia) Igor Prins	11 July 2016
Flora	(Estonia) Jürgen Henn	Caretaker spell over	13 July 2016	4th	(Estonia) Argo Arbeiter	13 July 2016

== League table ==
Pos	Team	Pld	W	D	L	GF	GA	GD	Pts	Qualification or relegation
1	Infonet Tallinn (C)	36	24	8	4	74	33	+41	80	Qualification for the Champions League first qualifying round
2	Levadia Tallinn	36	24	6	6	77	30	+47	78	Qualification for the Europa League first qualifying round (Note: Since the winner of the 2016–17 Estonian Cup FCI Tallinn had qualified to Champions League, the cup winners' spot was inherited by fourth-placed club Flora.)
3	Nõmme Kalju	36	22	9	5	70	28	+42	75	Qualification for the Europa League first qualifying round
4	Flora Tallinn	36	21	10	5	96	31	+65	73	Qualification for the Europa League first qualifying round
5	Sillamäe Kalev	36	14	9	13	65	55	+10	51	
6	Paide Linnameeskond	36	14	6	16	58	61	−3	48	
7	Tartu Tammeka	36	12	5	19	43	65	−22	41	
8	Narva Trans	36	11	8	17	60	68	−8	41	
9	Pärnu Linnameeskond (O)	36	5	2	29	24	98	−74	17	Qualification for the relegation play-offs
10	Rakvere Tarvas (R)	36	0	3	33	15	113	−98	3	Relegation to the Esiliiga

Source: Estonian Football Association (in Estonian), UEFA, Soccerway
Rules for classification: 1) Points; 2) Play-off (only if deciding champion); 3) Less matches awarded against; 4) Head-to-head points; 5) Head-to-head goal difference; 6) Matches won; 7) Goal difference; 8) Goals scored; 9) Away goals scored; 10) Fairplay ranking.
(C) Champions; (O) Play-off winners; (R) Relegated

=== Relegation play-offs ===
At season's end Pärnu, the ninth place club, participated in a two-legged play-off with Maardu Linnameeskond, the runners-up (of independent teams) of the 2016 Esiliiga, for the spot in 2017 Meistriliiga.

12 November 2016	Maardu Linnameeskond	1–5	Pärnu Linnameeskond	Maardu
13:00 UTC+2	Zelentsov 59' (pen.)	Report	Aristov 8' (o.g.); Saarts 30', 54'; Tutk 45'; Vihmoja 71'	Stadium: Maardu artificial turf Attendance: 86; Referee: Juri Frischer

19 November 2016	Pärnu Linnameeskond	4–3	Maardu Linnameeskond	Pärnu
13:00 UTC+2	Saarts 22'; Boldyrev 37' (o.g.); Pärnat 43'; Vunk 88'	Report	Abdullajev 27'; Krivošein 53'; Zelentsov 89'	Stadium: Pärnu artificial turf Attendance: 135; Referee: Kristo Tohver

Pärnu Linnameeskond won 9–4 on aggregate and retained their Meistriliiga spot for the 2017 season.

== Results ==
Each team plays every opponent four times, twice at home and twice away, for a total of 36 games.

=== First half of season ===
Home \ Away	FLO	INF	NÕM	LEV	PAI	PÄR	SIL	TAM	TAR	NAR
Flora		3–0	0–0	1–2	2–0	6–0	0–0	0–0	6–0	3–0
Infonet	1–1		2–1	3–2	1–0	3–1	0–0	4–0	4–1	2–1
Nõmme Kalju	2–0	2–1		0–1	1–0	3–0	2–0	2–0	3–1	6–0
Levadia	0–0	1–0	1–1		4–0	1–0	2–1	1–1	2–0	1–0
Paide	1–1	0–2	1–1	0–1		4–0	1–3	3–0	4–2	3–2
Pärnu	0–3	0–2	0–1	1–0	0–3		0–2	0–1	3–0	0–1
Sillamäe Kalev	2–4	2–2	1–3	0–2	1–1	4–1		5–1	1–0	3–0
Tammeka	0–4	1–2	0–3	1–4	2–0	2–1	4–0		3–1	2–2
Tarvas	0–5	0–1	1–6	0–4	0–5	1–2	0–3	0–1		0–1
Narva Trans	1–2	0–3	1–1	1–1	2–3	4–0	3–3	4–1	2–2	

Source: Estonian Football Association
Legend: Blue = home team win; Yellow = draw; Red = away team win.

=== Second half of season ===
Home \ Away	FLO	INF	NÕM	LEV	PAI	PÄR	SIL	TAM	TAR	NAR
Flora		2–1	1–1	6–1	4–0	3–0	3–3	0–0	4–0	4–1
Infonet	4–3		2–2	0–0	3–1	1–0	4–2	1–0	6–0	4–3
Nõmme Kalju	3–3	1–2		0–3	1–1	0–0	3–1	3–0	2–0	2–0
Levadia	2–1	2–2	1–2		7–1	2–0	2–1	4–0	4–0	5–0
Paide	0–3	1–4	2–0	0–4		4–1	2–1	3–1	7–0	0–0
Pärnu	1–6	0–5	1–5	0–4	3–1		2–5	0–3	2–1	1–7
Sillamäe Kalev	1–4	0–0	0–1	3–2	0–0	4–2		1–2	4–0	2–1
Tammeka	3–1	0–1	0–1	1–2	1–4	2–0	0–0		5–0	0–2
Tarvas	1–4	0–1	1–2	0–1	0–1	1–1	0–3	1–3		0–6
Narva Trans	AWD (Note: EJL awarded Flora a win due to Narva Trans fielding a suspended player. The original match had ended in a 0–2 defeat.)	0–0	0–3	3–1	3–1	3–1	1–3	4–2	1–1	

Source: Estonian Football Association
Legend: Blue = home team win; Yellow = draw; Red = away team win.

== Season statistics ==
=== Top scorers ===
Rank	Player	Club	Goals
1	(Russia) Yevgeni Kabaev	Sillamäe Kalev	25
2	(Estonia) Rauno Sappinen	Flora	19
2	(Estonia) Vjatšeslav Zahovaiko	Paide Linnameeskond	19
4	(Estonia) Rauno Alliku	Flora	15
5	(Russia) Anton Miranchuk	Levadia	14
5	(Russia) Dmitri Proshin	Narva Trans	14
5	(Estonia) Ats Purje	Nõmme Kalju	14
5	(Finland) Sakari Tukiainen	Flora	14
9	(Estonia) Kristjan Tiirik	Tammeka	12
9	(Estonia) Vladimir Voskoboinikov	Infonet	12

=== Hat-tricks ===
Player	For	Against	Result	Date
(Finland) Sakari Tukiainen^{5}	Flora	Tarvas	6–0	8 March 2016
(Estonia) Vjatšeslav Zahovaiko	Paide Linnameeskond	Tarvas	4–2	13 May 2016
(Estonia) Albert Prosa	Flora	Sillamäe Kalev	4–2	13 May 2016
(Estonia) Rauno Alliku^{4}	Flora	Tarvas	5–0	19 June 2016
(Azerbaijan) Rizvan Umarov	Narva Trans	Tammeka	4–1	19 June 2016
(Estonia) Vjatšeslav Zahovaiko	Paide Linnameeskond	Tammeka	3–0	9 July 2016
(Estonia) Ats Purje	Nõmme Kalju	Tarvas	6–1	10 July 2016
(Russia) Anton Miranchuk	Levadia	Paide Linnameeskond	7–1	24 July 2016
(Finland) Sakari Tukiainen	Flora	Paide Linnameeskond	3–0	29 July 2016
(Russia) Yevgeni Kabaev^{4}	Sillamäe Kalev	Tammeka	5–1	30 July 2016
(Estonia) Vjatšeslav Zahovaiko	Paide Linnameeskond	Pärnu Linnameeskond	4–1	9 September 2016
(Estonia) Kaspar Paur	Tammeka	Tarvas	5–0	9 September 2016
(Estonia) Andrei Sidorenkov	Nõmme Kalju	Pärnu Linnameeskond	4–0	17 September 2016
(Estonia) Rauno Alliku	Flora	Pärnu Linnameeskond	6–1	1 October 2016
(Russia) Dmitri Barkov	Narva Trans	Pärnu Linnameeskond	7–1	29 October 2016

^{4} Player scored 4 goals.
^{5} Player scored 5 goals.

=== Average attendance ===
Club	Average attendance
Tallinna FC Flora	388
Nõmme JK Kalju	321
Tartu JK Tammeka	297
Pärnu Linnameeskond	285
Tallinna FC Levadia	234
Tallinna FC Infonet	222
Paide Linnameeskond	206
Rakvere JK Tarvas	205
JK Sillamäe Kalev	174
JK Narva Trans	144
League average	248

== Awards ==
=== Monthly awards ===
Month	Manager of the Month		Player of the Month	
Month	Manager	Club	Player	Club
March	(Estonia) Aleksandr Puštov	Infonet	(Ghana) Ofosu Appiah	Infonet
April	(Estonia) Meelis Rooba	Paide Linnameeskond	(Estonia) Andrei Sidorenkov	Nõmme Kalju
May	(Estonia) Aleksandr Puštov	Infonet	(Russia) Anton Miranchuk	Levadia
June/July	(Lithuania) Algimantas Briaunys	Sillamäe Kalev	(Estonia) Dmitri Kruglov	Infonet
August	(Estonia) Argo Arbeiter	Flora	(Estonia) Gert Kams	Flora
September	(Estonia) Igor Prins	Levadia	(Estonia) Vjatšeslav Zahovaiko	Paide Linnameeskond
October	(Russia) Sergei Frantsev	Nõmme Kalju	(Russia) Yevgeni Kabaev	Sillamäe Kalev

=== Meistriliiga Player of the Year ===
Yevgeni Kabaev was named Meistriliiga Player of the Year.

== See also ==
- 2015–16 Estonian Cup
- 2016–17 Estonian Cup
- 2016 Esiliiga
- 2016 Esiliiga B
