= 2014 Meistriliiga =

Estonian national championships in football

Meistriliiga
- Season: 2014
- Champions: Levadia; 9th title
- Relegated: Tallinna Kalev; Lokomotiv
- Champions League: Levadia
- Europa League: Sillamäe Kalev; Flora; Nõmme Kalju
- Matches played: 180
- Goals scored: 642 (3.57 per match)
- Top goalscorer: Yevgeni Kabaev (36 goals)
- Biggest home win: Levadia 9–0 Tallinna Kalev (15 June); Infonet 10–1 Lokomotiv (1 August); Nõmme Kalju 9–0 Lokomotiv (16 September); Levadia 9–0 Lokomotiv (2 November)
- Biggest away win: Tallinna Kalev 0–8 Levadia (15 March)
- Highest scoring: Infonet 10–1 Lokomotiv (1 August)
- Longest winning run: 8 games Sillamäe Kalev; Flora; Nõmme Kalju
- Longest unbeaten run: 19 games Levadia
- Longest winless run: 23 games Lokomotiv
- Longest losing run: 19 games Tallinna Kalev

The 2014 Meistriliiga, also known as A. Le Coq Premium Liiga due to sponsorship reasons, was the 24th season of the Meistriliiga, the first level in the Estonian football system. The season ran from 1 March 2014 to 8 November 2014. Levadia successfully defended the title, securing the championship in the last round.

== Teams ==
Kuressaare were relegated to the 2014 Esiliiga after finishing in the bottom of the table at the end of the 2013 season, ending their five-year tenure in the top flight. They were replaced by Lokomotiv, Esiliiga runners-up and first among promotion-eligible teams. Lokomotiv will make their first appearance in the top division.

One spot in the league was decided in a two-legged play-off between Esiliiga's 4th Tarvas and Meistriliiga's 9th-placed team Tammeka. Tammeka won 6–2 on aggregate and therefore retained its place in Meistriliiga.

Tammeka hit financial trouble in the second half of 2013 season, but refused the reorganization plan set by Estonian Football Association. In February Tammeka were stripped of their Meistriliiga license. Tammeka entry was later granted for 2014 season to Football School Tammeka, financially independent part of the club run by former employees of football club Tammeka.

=== Stadiums and locations ===
Location of the 2014 Meistriliiga teams

| Team | Location | Stadium | Seating capacity |
|---|---|---|---|
| Flora | Tallinn | A. Le Coq Arena | 9,692 |
| Infonet | Tallinn | Sportland Arena | 540 |
| Levadia | Tallinn | Kadriorg Stadium | 5,000 |
| Lokomotiv | Jõhvi | Jõhvi linnastaadion | 60 |
| Narva Trans | Narva | Kreenholm Stadium | 1,065 |
| Nõmme Kalju | Tallinn | Kadriorg Stadium | 5,000 |
| Paide Linnameeskond | Paide | Paide linnastaadion | 268 |
| Sillamäe Kalev | Sillamäe | Sillamäe Kalev Stadium | 800 |
| Tallinna Kalev | Tallinn | Kalev Keskstaadion | 11,500 |
| Tammeka | Tartu | Tartu Tamme Stadium | 1,750 |

=== Personnel and kits ===
Note: Flags indicate national team as has been defined under FIFA eligibility rules. Players and Managers may hold more than one non-FIFA nationality.

| Team | Manager | Captain | Kit manufacturer | Shirt sponsor |
|---|---|---|---|---|
| Flora | (Estonia) Norbert Hurt | (Estonia) Sander Post | Nike | Tele2 |
| Infonet | (Estonia) Aleksandr Puštov | (Estonia) Vladimir Avilov | Joma | Infonet |
| Levadia | (Estonia) Marko Kristal | (Ukraine) Roman Smishko | Adidas | Viimsi Keevitus |
| Lokomotiv | (Russia) Aleksei Tikhomirov | (Estonia) Valeri Smelkov | Adidas | Spacecom |
| Narva Trans | (Russia) Aleksei Yagudin | (Estonia) Roman Nesterovski | Nike | Fama |
| Nõmme Kalju | (Estonia) Igor Prins | (Estonia) Vitali Teleš | Adidas | Optibet |
| Paide Linnameeskond | (Estonia) Meelis Rooba | (Estonia) Liivo Leetma | Nike | Verston |
| Sillamäe Kalev | (Russia) Sergei Frantsev | (Estonia) Vjatšeslav Zahovaiko | Uhlsport | Alexela |
| Tallinna Kalev | (Estonia) Sergei Zamogilnõi | (Estonia) Daniil Savitski | Jako | Viking Line |
| Tammeka | (Estonia) Indrek Koser | (Estonia) Jürgen Lorenz | Nike | Goldtime |

=== Managerial changes ===
| Team | Outgoing manager | Manner of departure | Date of vacancy | Position in table | Replaced by | Date of appointment |
|---|---|---|---|---|---|---|
| Tallinna Kalev | (Germany) Frank Bernhardt | Mutual agreement | 13 December 2013 | Pre-season | (Estonia) Tarmo Rüütli | 13 December 2013 |
| Tammeka | (Germany) Uwe Erkenbrecher | End of contract | 31 December 2013 | Pre-season | (Estonia) Indrek Koser | 14 February 2014 |
| Tallinna Kalev | (Estonia) Tarmo Rüütli | Signed by Irtysh Pavlodar | 6 March 2014 | 9th | (Estonia) Sergei Zamogilnõi | 10 March 2014 |
| Lokomotiv | (Latvia) Viktors Ņesterenko | Sacked | 22 April 2014 | 10th | (Russia) Aleksei Tikhomirov | 23 April 2014 |
| Sillamäe Kalev | (Estonia) Sergei Ratnikov | Mutual agreement | 26 April 2014 | 1st | (Ukraine) Vadym Dobizha (caretaker) | 26 April 2014 |
| Lokomotiv | (Russia) Aleksei Tikhomirov | Mutual agreement | 3 June 2014 | 10th | (Estonia) Andrei Škaleta | 6 June 2014 |
| Narva Trans | (Estonia) Valeri Bondarenko | Sacked | 14 June 2014 | 7th | (Russia) Aleksei Yagudin | 14 June 2014 |
| Sillamäe Kalev | (Ukraine) Vadym Dobizha | Caretaker spell over | 13 July 2014 | 4th | (Russia) Sergei Frantsev | 13 July 2014 |
| Lokomotiv | (Estonia) Andrei Škaleta | Mutual agreement | 6 August 2014 | 10th | (Russia) Aleksei Tikhomirov | 6 August 2014 |

=== Player transfers ===
- Transfers made during the 2013–14 winter transfer window (3 January – 28 February 2014)
- Transfers made during the 2014 summer transfer window (20 June – 20 July 2014)

== League table ==
| Pos | Team | Pld | W | D | L | GF | GA | GD | Pts | Qualification or relegation |
|---|---|---|---|---|---|---|---|---|---|---|
| 1 | Levadia (C) | 36 | 26 | 6 | 4 | 112 | 19 | +93 | 84 | Qualification for Champions League first qualifying round |
| 2 | Sillamäe Kalev | 36 | 25 | 4 | 7 | 108 | 34 | +74 | 79 | Qualification for Europa League first qualifying round (Note: Nõmme Kalju qualified for the first qualifying round of the UEFA Europa League as winners of the 2014–15 Estonian Cup) |
| 3 | Flora | 36 | 24 | 7 | 5 | 88 | 36 | +52 | 79 | Qualification for Europa League first qualifying round |
| 4 | Nõmme Kalju | 36 | 24 | 6 | 6 | 85 | 19 | +66 | 78 | Qualification for Europa League first qualifying round |
| 5 | Infonet | 36 | 19 | 9 | 8 | 80 | 44 | +36 | 66 | |
| 6 | Paide Linnameeskond | 36 | 9 | 8 | 19 | 39 | 67 | −28 | 35 | |
| 7 | Tammeka | 36 | 7 | 7 | 22 | 37 | 83 | −46 | 28 | |
| 8 | Narva Trans | 36 | 6 | 10 | 20 | 37 | 79 | −42 | 28 | |
| 9 | Lokomotiv (R) | 36 | 4 | 6 | 26 | 35 | 115 | −80 | 18 | Qualification for relegation play-offs |
| 10 | Tallinna Kalev (R) | 36 | 3 | 3 | 30 | 21 | 146 | −125 | 12 | Relegation to Esiliiga |

Source: Estonian Football Association (in Estonian)
Rules for classification: 1) points; 2) fewest withdrawals or annulled matches; 3) overall wins; 4) head-to-head points; 5) head-to-head goal difference; 6) goal difference; 7) goals scored; 8) away goals scored; 9) fair-play points.
If two (or more) teams on the top have the same number of points by the end of the season, the aforementioned rules will not apply and additional game(s) will be played to determine the champions
(C) Champions; (R) Relegated

=== Relegation play-offs ===
At season's end Lokomotiv, the ninth place club in the Meistriliiga, participated in a two-legged play-off with Tulevik, the runners-up (of the independent teams) of the 2014 Esiliiga, for the spot in next year's competition.

| 16 November 2014 | Tulevik | 0–0 | Lokomotiv | Viljandi |
| 13:00 EET (GMT+2) | | Report | | Stadium: Viljandi Linnastaadion; Attendance: 260; Referee: Kristo Tohver |

| 22 November 2014 | Lokomotiv | 1–1 | Tulevik | Kohtla-Järve |
| 13:00 EET (GMT+2) | Yablokov 53' | Report | Ilves 71' | Stadium: Ahtme Gümnaasiumi kunstmuru Attendance: 96; Referee: Eiko Saar |

1–1 on aggregate. Tulevik won on away goals and secured promotion to 2015 Meistriliiga

== Results ==
Each team plays every opponent four times, twice at home and twice away, for a total of 36 games.

=== First-half of season ===
| Home \ Away | FLO | INF | NÕM | LEV | LOK | PAI | SIL | T.K | TAM | NAR |
|---|---|---|---|---|---|---|---|---|---|---|
| Flora | | 2–3 | 1–0 | 0–0 | 3–1 | 5–0 | 1–1 | 5–1 | 3–0 | 1–0 |
| Infonet | 2–3 | | 0–0 | 0–4 | 2–0 | 1–1 | 3–3 | 6–0 | 3–0 | 4–0 |
| Nõmme Kalju | 1–1 | w/o (Note: Infonet were awarded a win as Nõmme Kalju fielded a suspended player. The match had ended 1–0.) | | 0–0 | 5–1 | 3–0 | 1–0 | 2–1 | 6–0 | 2–1 |
| Levadia | 1–1 | 3–0 | 1–0 | | 6–0 | 0–1 | 2–2 | 9–0 | 2–0 | 1–0 |
| Lokomotiv | 1–3 | 1–1 | 0–2 | 0–4 | | 1–2 | 1–3 | 0–1 | 2–2 | 0–2 |
| Paide | 1–5 | 0–1 | 0–6 | 0–2 | 3–0 | | 0–3 | 6–2 | 0–4 | 0–0 |
| Sillamäe Kalev | 1–2 | 3–1 | 0–3 | 0–2 | 6–1 | 3–1 | | 6–1 | 5–0 | 1–1 |
| Tallinna Kalev | 1–4 | 1–3 | 0–3 | 0–8 | 2–1 | 1–1 | 0–6 | | 1–6 | 3–1 |
| Tammeka | 1–1 | 0–4 | 0–2 | 0–7 | 1–1 | 2–4 | 0–6 | 2–0 | | 1–1 |
| Narva Trans | 0–1 | 1–1 | 0–4 | 0–0 | 5–0 | 1–0 | 1–4 | 1–1 | 1–2 | |

Source: Estonian Football Association
Legend: Blue = home team win; Yellow = draw; Red = away team win.

=== Second-half of season ===
| Home \ Away | FLO | INF | NÕM | LEV | LOK | PAI | SIL | T.K | TAM | NAR |
|---|---|---|---|---|---|---|---|---|---|---|
| Flora | | 2–2 | 0–2 | 1–2 | 6–2 | 3–0 | 1–0 | 2–0 | 1–0 | 6–0 |
| Infonet | 1–3 | | 1–3 | 2–0 | 10–1 | 0–0 | 0–2 | 5–0 | 3–2 | 5–2 |
| Nõmme Kalju | 1–0 | 1–1 | | 0–1 | 9–0 | 3–1 | 0–2 | 5–0 | 3–0 | 1–0 |
| Levadia | 1–1 | 2–3 | 3–2 | | 9–0 | 4–1 | 0–3 | 5–0 | 1–0 | 7–0 |
| Lokomotiv | 2–5 | 0–3 | 1–3 | 1–5 | | 0–0 | 1–2 | 1–0 | 2–0 | 3–2 |
| Paide | 1–2 | 0–1 | 1–1 | 0–3 | 1–0 | | 2–3 | 4–1 | 0–1 | 1–1 |
| Sillamäe Kalev | 3–2 | 3–0 | 2–3 | 0–1 | 2–0 | 4–0 | | 8–0 | 1–0 | 7–1 |
| Tallinna Kalev | 0–2 | 0–4 | 0–7 | 0–7 | 0–5 | 0–3 | 1–8 | | 1–1 | 0–3 |
| Tammeka | 2–4 | 1–1 | 0–1 | 0–1 | 3–3 | 0–4 | 1–4 | 2–1 | | 2–1 |
| Narva Trans | 0–1 | 0–3 | 0–0 | 1–8 | 2–2 | 0–0 | 0–1 | 4–1 | 2–1 | |

Source: Estonian Football Association
Legend: Blue = home team win; Yellow = draw; Red = away team win.

== Season statistics ==
=== Top scorers ===
| Rank | Player | Club | Goals |
|---|---|---|---|
| 1 | (Russia) Yevgeni Kabaev | Sillamäe Kalev | 36 |
| 2 | (Estonia) Igor Subbotin | Levadia | 32 |
| 3 | (Ivory Coast) Manucho | Infonet | 30 |
| 4 | (Estonia) Albert Prosa | Flora | 22 |
| 5 | (Japan) Hidetoshi Wakui | Nõmme Kalju | 21 |
| 6 | (Russia) Vladislav Ivanov | Levadia | 19 |
| 7 | (Russia) Stanislav Murikhin | Sillamäe Kalev | 16 |
| 8 | (Estonia) Rauno Alliku | Flora | 15 |
| 8 | (Estonia) Ingemar Teever | Levadia | 15 |
| 10 | (Estonia) Tarmo Neemelo | Nõmme Kalju | 14 |

=== Hat-tricks ===
| Player | For | Against | Result | Date |
|---|---|---|---|---|
| (Estonia) Kristjan Tiirik | Tammeka | Tallinna Kalev | 6–1 (A) | 29 March 2014 |
| (Estonia) Rauno Alliku | Flora | Tallinna Kalev | 4–1 (A) | 19 April 2014 |
| (Ivory Coast) Manucho | Infonet | Tallinna Kalev | 6–0 (H) | 25 April 2014 |
| (Russia) Vladislav Ivanov | Levadia | Infonet | 4–0 (A) | 12 May 2014 |
| (Russia) Stanislav Murikhin | Sillamäe Kalev | Tammeka | 6–0 (A) | 20 May 2014 |
| (Estonia) Rasmus Tomson | Paide Linnameeskond | Tallinna Kalev | 6–2 (H) | 20 May 2014 |
| (Russia) Vladislav Ivanov^{4} | Levadia | Tammeka | 7–0 (A) | 10 June 2014 |
| (Russia) Vladislav Ivanov | Levadia | Tallinna Kalev | 9–0 (H) | 15 June 2014 |
| (Estonia) Igor Subbotin | Levadia | Tallinna Kalev | 9–0 (H) | 15 June 2014 |
| (Russia) Yevgeni Kabaev | Sillamäe Kalev | Tallinna Kalev | 6–1 (H) | 7 July 2014 |
| (Ivory Coast) Manucho^{4} | Infonet | Tallinna Kalev | 5–0 (H) | 13 July 2014 |
| (Japan) Hidetoshi Wakui | Nõmme Kalju | Tammeka | 3–0 (H) | 14 July 2014 |
| (Estonia) Jarmo Ahjupera | Nõmme Kalju | Tallinna Kalev | 5–0 (H) | 28 July 2014 |
| (Estonia) Robert Kirss | Nõmme Kalju | Lokomotiv | 5–1 (H) | 22 August 2014 |
| (Estonia) Albert Prosa | Flora | Paide Linnameeskond | 3–0 (H) | 23 August 2014 |
| (Russia) Stanislav Murikhin | Sillamäe Kalev | Tallinna Kalev | 8–0 (H) | 30 August 2014 |
| (Russia) Yevgeni Kabaev^{4} | Sillamäe Kalev | Tallinna Kalev | 8–0 (H) | 30 August 2014 |
| (Russia) Yevgeni Kabaev | Sillamäe Kalev | Tallinna Kalev | 8–1 (A) | 13 September 2014 |
| (Brazil) Felipe Nunes^{4} | Nõmme Kalju | Lokomotiv | 9–0 (H) | 16 September 2014 |
| (Estonia) Tarmo Neemelo | Nõmme Kalju | Lokomotiv | 9–0 (H) | 16 September 2014 |
| (Estonia) Igor Subbotin^{4} | Levadia | Tallinna Kalev | 5–0 (H) | 19 September 2014 |
| (Estonia) Tarmo Neemelo | Nõmme Kalju | Tallinna Kalev | 7–0 (A) | 25 October 2014 |
| (Estonia) Igor Subbotin^{4} | Levadia | Lokomotiv | 9–0 (H) | 2 November 2014 |
| (Estonia) Igor Subbotin^{4} | Levadia | Narva Trans | 8–1 (A) | 8 November 2014 |
| (Ivory Coast) Manucho | Infonet | Tallinna Kalev | 4–0 (A) | 8 November 2014 |

Notes

^{4} Player scored 4 goals
(H) – Home team
(A) – Away team

=== Average attendance ===
| Club | Average attendance |
|---|---|
| Tallinna FC Flora | 747 |
| Nõmme JK Kalju | 411 |
| Tartu JK Tammeka | 320 |
| Tallinna FC Levadia | 253 |
| JK Sillamäe Kalev | 209 |
| JK Narva Trans | 146 |
| Tallinna FC Infonet | 141 |
| Paide Linnameeskond | 122 |
| Jõhvi FC Lokomotiv | 117 |
| JK Tallinna Kalev | 98 |
| League average | 256 |

== Awards ==
| Month | Manager of the Month | | Player of the Month | |
| Month | Manager | Club | Player | Club |
|---|---|---|---|---|
| March | (Estonia) Sergei Ratnikov | Sillamäe Kalev | (Estonia) Albert Prosa | Flora |
| April | (Estonia) Igor Prins | Nõmme Kalju | (Estonia) Mikk Reintam | Nõmme Kalju |
| May | (Estonia) Norbert Hurt | Flora | (Estonia) Daniil Ratnikov | Sillamäe Kalev |
| June | (Estonia) Marko Kristal | Levadia | (Georgia (country)) Lasha Omanidze | Tallinna Kalev |
| July | (Estonia) Aleksandr Puštov | Infonet | (Estonia) Karl-Eerik Luigend | Flora |
| August | (Russia) Sergei Frantsev | Sillamäe Kalev | (Russia) Yevgeni Kabaev | Sillamäe Kalev |
| September | (Estonia) Igor Prins | Nõmme Kalju | (Ukraine) Roman Smishko | Levadia |
| October | (Russia) Sergei Frantsev | Sillamäe Kalev | (Ivory Coast) Manucho | Infonet |

=== Meistriliiga Player of the Year ===
Yevgeni Kabaev was named Meistriliiga Player of the Year.

== See also ==
- 2013–14 Estonian Cup
- 2014–15 Estonian Cup
- 2014 Esiliiga
- 2014 Esiliiga B
