= Linnameeskond =

Linnameeskond may refer to the following Estonian association football clubs:

- Maardu Linnameeskond
- Paide Linnameeskond
- Paide Linnameeskond II
- Pärnu Linnameeskond
