= Meistriliiga Player of the Year =

Estonian sport award

The Meistriliiga Player of the Year is an annual award given to the best Meistriliiga player for his performances in the league.

== Winners ==
Year	Player	Club
2006	(Estonia) Marek Lemsalu	Levadia
2007	(Finland) Juha Hakola	Flora
2008	(Estonia) Martin Vunk	Flora
2009	(Estonia) Konstantin Nahk	Levadia
2010	(Estonia) Sander Post	Flora
2011	(Estonia) Sergei Mošnikov	Flora
2012	(Estonia) Igor Morozov	Levadia
2013	(Estonia) Rimo Hunt	Levadia
2014	(Russia) Yevgeni Kabaev (1)	Sillamäe Kalev
2015	(Estonia) Ingemar Teever	Levadia
2016	(Russia) Yevgeni Kabaev (2)	Sillamäe Kalev
2017	(Estonia) Rauno Sappinen (1)	Flora
2018	(Georgia (country)) Zakaria Beglarishvili	Flora
2019	(Estonia) Konstantin Vassiljev (1)	Flora
2020	(Estonia) Rauno Sappinen (2)	Flora
2021	(Estonia) Rauno Sappinen (3)	Flora
2022	(Estonia) Konstantin Vassiljev (2)	Flora
2023	(Estonia) Konstantin Vassiljev (3)	Flora
2024	(Estonia) Alex Matthias Tamm	Nõmme Kalju
2025	(Estonia) Rauno Sappinen (4)	Flora

== Fans' Player of the Year ==
In addition to the Meistriliiga Player of the Year, the Meistriliiga Fans' Player of the Year is voted by the readers of Soccernet.ee.

Year	Player	Club
2005	(Estonia) Tarmo Neemelo	TVMK
2006	(Estonia) Marek Lemsalu	Levadia
2007	(Finland) Juha Hakola	Flora
2008	(Finland) Juha Hakola (2)	Flora
2009	(Estonia) Sander Puri	Levadia
2010	(Estonia) Sander Post	Flora
2011	(Latvia) Aleksandrs Čekulajevs	Narva Trans
2012	(Estonia) Igor Morozov	Levadia
2013	(Estonia) Rimo Hunt	Levadia
2014	(Estonia) Igor Subbotin	Levadia
2015	(Estonia) Rauno Sappinen	Flora
2016	(Ghana) Ofosu Appiah	Infonet
2017	(Estonia) Rauno Sappinen (2)	Flora
2018	(Georgia (country)) Zakaria Beglarishvili	Flora
2019	(Estonia) Konstantin Vassiljev	Flora
2020	(Estonia) Rauno Sappinen (3)	Flora
2021	(Georgia (country)) Zakaria Beglarishvili (2)	Levadia
2022	(Estonia) Robi Saarma	Paide Linnameeskond
2023	(Estonia) Konstantin Vassiljev (2)	Flora
2024	(Estonia) Mihkel Ainsalu	Levadia
2025	(Estonia) Rauno Sappinen (4)	Flora

== See also ==
- Esiliiga Player of the Year
- Esiliiga B Player of the Year
