= Rauno Sappinen =

Estonian footballer (born 1996)

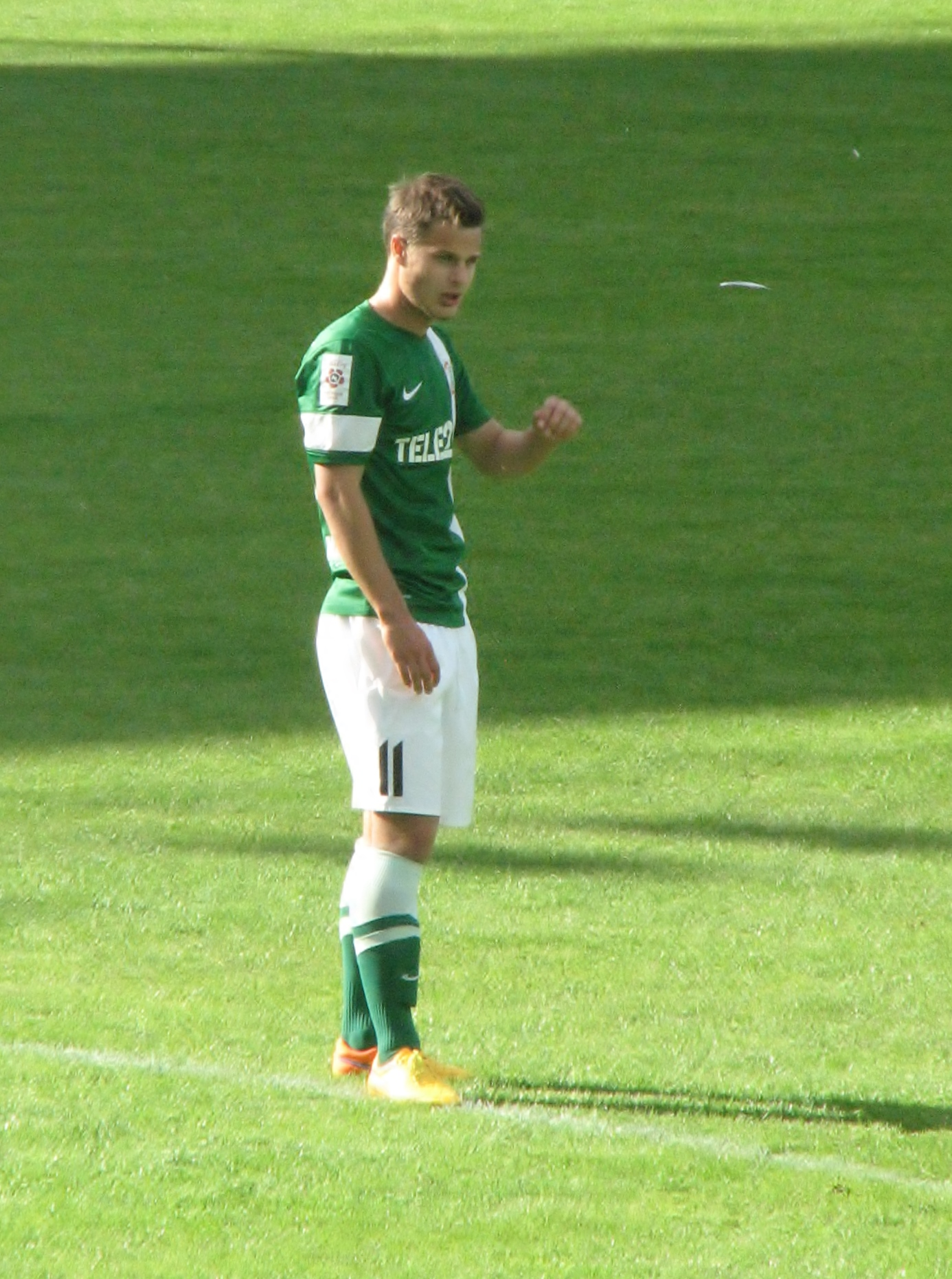
- Sappinen with Flora in 2015

Personal information
- Date of birth: 23 January 1996 (age 30)
- Place of birth: Tallinn, Estonia
- Height: 1.79 m (5 ft 10 in)
- Position: Forward

Team information
- Current team: Olympiakos Nicosia
- Number: 15

Youth career
- 2004: Kotkas Juunior
- 2005: Mustamäe
- 2006–2012: Flora

Senior career*
Years	Team	Apps	(Gls)
2012	Flora III	12	(9)
2012–2014	Flora II	32	(6)
2013–2022	Flora	194	(118)
2018	→ Beerschot Wilrijk (loan)	1	(0)
2018–2019	→ Den Bosch (loan)	30	(6)
2019–2020	→ Domžale (loan)	10	(2)
2022–2023	Piast Gliwice	19	(1)
2023	→ Stal Mielec (loan)	14	(3)
2023	Hapoel Jerusalem	0	(0)
2024–2026	Flora	60	(30)
2026–	Olympiakos Nicosia	3	(0)

International career^{‡}
2011	Estonia U16	2	(0)
2011–2013	Estonia U17	15	(1)
2013–2014	Estonia U19	16	(1)
2013–2018	Estonia U21	20	(4)
2016	Estonia U23	1	(0)
2015–	Estonia	65	(17)
- * Club domestic league appearances and goals as of 13 September 2026 ‡ National team caps and goals as of 19:47, 31 May 2026 (UTC)

Rauno Sappinen (born 23 January 1996) is an Estonian professional footballer who plays as a forward for Olympiakos Nicosia and the Estonia national team.

== Club career ==
=== Flora ===
Sappinen came through the youth system at Flora and made his debut in the Meistriliiga on 2 March 2013, in a 4–1 home win over Tallinna Kalev. He won his first Meistriliiga title in the 2015 season. Sappinen's performances in 2015 also saw him voted Estonian Young Footballer of the Year. He was Flora's top goalscorer in the league for three consecutive seasons from 2015 to 2017, and joint top scorer in the Meistriliiga in 2017, alongside Albert Prosa. Sappinen won his second Meistriliiga title in the 2017 season, and was named Meistriliiga Player of the Year.

==== Loan to Beerschot Wilrijk ====
On 31 January 2018, Sappinen joined Belgian club Beerschot Wilrijk on loan until the end of the season. He made his debut for the club on 9 February 2018, in a 0–0 home draw against Westerlo.

==== Loan to Den Bosch ====
On 13 August 2018, Sappinen joined Dutch club Den Bosch on loan until the end of the season. He made his debut in the Eerste Divisie on 17 August 2018, and scored the winning goal in a 2–1 away victory over Volendam.

==== Loan to Domžale ====
On 14 August 2019, Sappinen penned a three-year loan deal with Slovenian club Domžale.

==== Return to Flora ====
On 6 July 2021, Sappinen scored both goals in Flora's win over Hibernians in the first leg of their UEFA Champions League first qualifying round match. He would score again in the second leg a week later as Flora won 5–0 on aggregate and progressed to the second qualifying round for just the third time in club history.

=== Poland ===
On 22 December 2021, Sappinen signed a three-and-a-half-year contract with Polish Ekstraklasa club Piast Gliwice, effective from 1 February 2022.

On 24 January 2023, Sappinen joined Stal Mielec on loan until the end of the season with an option to buy.

=== Hapoel Jerusalem ===
In July 2023, Sappinen signed a one-year contract with Hapoel Jerusalem with an option for a two-year extension. Already on 19 August in a derby game against Beitar in the League Cup, Sappinen got a serious injury that meant his season was over. On 8 September 2023, his contract was terminated by mutual consent.

=== Olympiakos Nicosia ===
On the 18th of August 2026 he signed a one-year contract with a one-year extension option with Cypriot side Olympiakos Nicosia.

== International career ==
Sappinen began his international career for Estonia in 2011 with the under-16 national team, and has captained the under-19 and under-21 national sides.

Sappinen made his senior international debut for Estonia on 11 November 2015, in a 3–0 home victory over Georgia in a friendly. He scored his first international goal on 19 November 2016, in a 1–1 away draw against Saint Kitts and Nevis in a friendly.

== Career statistics ==
=== Club ===
As of match played 2 December 2025

Appearances and goals by club, season and competition
Club	Season	League			National cup (Note: Includes Estonian Cup, KNVB Cup, Slovenian Cup, Polish Cup)		Continental		Other		Total	
Club	Season	Division	Apps	Goals	Apps	Goals	Apps	Goals	Apps	Goals	Apps	Goals
Flora III	2012	II liiga	12	9	—		—		—		12	9
Flora II	2012	Esiliiga	10	1	2	0	—		—		12	1
Flora II	2013	Esiliiga	8	0	0	0	—		—		8	0
Flora II	2014	Esiliiga	14	5	0	0	—		—		14	5
Flora II	Total		32	6	2	0	—		—		34	6
Flora	2013	Meistriliiga	23	5	5	0	1 (Note: Appearances in UEFA Europa League)	0	—		29	5
Flora	2014	Meistriliiga	12	2	3	4	—		1 (Note: Appearances in Estonian Super Cup)	0	16	6
Flora	2015	Meistriliiga	32	16	3	2	2	0	—		37	18
Flora	2016	Meistriliiga	32	19	6	3	2 (Note: Appearances in UEFA Champions League)	1	1	1	41	24
Flora	2017	Meistriliiga	35	27	1	0	2	0	1	0	39	27
Flora	2018	Meistriliiga	2	0	0	0	3 (Note: Two appearances and one goal in UEFA Champions League, one appearance in UEFA Europa League)	1	0	0	5	1
Flora	2020	Meistriliiga	28	26	3	0	3 (Note: One appearance and one goal in Champions League, two appearances and one goal in UEFA Europa League)	2	1	1	35	29
Flora	2021	Meistriliiga	30	23	3	1	12 (Note: Four appearances and four goals in UEFA Champions League, two appearances and two goals in UEFA Europa League, six appearances and five goals in UEFA Europa Conference League)	11	1	1	46	36
Flora	Total		194	118	24	10	25	15	5	3	248	146
Beerschot Wilrijk (loan)	2017–18	Belgian First Division B	1	0	0	0	—		1 (Note: Appearance in UEFA Europa League play-offs)	0	2	0
Den Bosch (loan)	2018–19	Eerste Divisie	30	6	1	0	—		1 (Note: Appearance in Eredivisie promotion/relegation play-offs)	0	32	6
Domžale (loan)	2019–20	Slovenian PrvaLiga	10	2	1	0	—		—		11	2
Piast Gliwice	2021–22	Ekstraklasa	8	0	1	0	—		—		9	0
Piast Gliwice	2022–23	Ekstraklasa	11	1	2	0	—		—		13	1
Piast Gliwice	Total		19	1	3	0	—		—		22	1
Stal Mielec	2022–23	Ekstraklasa	14	3	0	0	—		—		14	3
Hapoel Jerusalem	2023–24	Israeli Premier League	0	0	0	0	—		5 (Note: Appearances in Toto Cup)	1	5	1
Flora	2024	Meistriliiga	5	1	—		4 (Note: Appearances in UEFA Conference League)	1	—		9	2
Flora	2025	Meistriliiga	36	20	0	0	2	1	0	0	38	21
Flora	Total		41	21	0	0	6	2	0	0	47	23
Career total			353	166	31	10	31	17	12	4	427	198

=== International ===
As of match played 30 March 2026

Appearances and goals by national team and year
National team	Year	Apps	Goals
Estonia	2015	2	0
Estonia	2016	9	1
Estonia	2017	5	1
Estonia	2018	2	0
Estonia	2019	7	0
Estonia	2020	7	4
Estonia	2021	11	2
Estonia	2022	6	2
Estonia	2023	4	2
Estonia	2024	2	0
Estonia	2025	8	5
Estonia	2026	2	0
Total		65	17

Scores and results list Estonia's goal tally first, score column indicates score after each Sappinen goal.

List of international goals scored by Rauno Sappinen
No.	Date	Venue	Cap	Opponent	Score	Result	Competition
1	19 November 2016	Warner Park, Basseterre, Saint Kitts and Nevis	11	Saint Kitts and Nevis	1–1	1–1	Friendly
2	12 November 2017	National Stadium, Ta' Qali, Malta	13	Malta	1–0	3–0	Friendly
3	11 October 2020	A. Le Coq Arena, Tallinn, Estonia	28	North Macedonia	1–1	3–3	2020–21 UEFA Nations League C
4	11 October 2020	A. Le Coq Arena, Tallinn, Estonia	28	North Macedonia	2–1	3–3	2020–21 UEFA Nations League C
5	14 October 2020	A. Le Coq Arena, Tallinn, Estonia	29	Armenia	1–1	1–1	2020–21 UEFA Nations League C
6	15 November 2020	National Arena Toše Proeski, Skopje, North Macedonia	31	North Macedonia	1–1	1–2	2020–21 UEFA Nations League C
7	24 March 2021	Arena Lublin, Lublin, Poland	33	Czech Republic	1–0	2–6	2022 FIFA World Cup qualification
8	4 June 2021	Helsinki Olympic Stadium, Helsinki, Finland	37	Finland	1–0	1–0	Friendly
9	23 September 2022	A. Le Coq Arena, Tallinn, Estonia	46	Malta	1–0	2–1	2022–23 UEFA Nations League D
10	26 September 2022	Olympic Stadium, Serravalle, San Marino	47	San Marino	3–0	4–0	2022–23 UEFA Nations League D
11	27 March 2023	Raiffeisen Arena, Linz, Austria	51	Austria	1–0	1–2	UEFA Euro 2024 qualifying
12	17 June 2023	Dalga Arena, Baku, Azerbaijan	52	Azerbaijan	1–0	1–1	UEFA Euro 2024 qualifying
13	25 March 2025	Zimbru Stadium, Chișinău, Moldova	56	Moldova	2–0	3–2	2026 FIFA World Cup qualification
14	11 October 2025	A. Le Coq Arena, Tallinn, Estonia	60	Italy	1–3	1–3	2026 FIFA World Cup qualification
15	18 November 2025	Alphamega Stadium, Limassol, Cyprus	63	Cyprus	2–2	4–2	Friendly
16	18 November 2025	Alphamega Stadium, Limassol, Cyprus	63	Cyprus	3–2	4–2	Friendly
17	18 November 2025	Alphamega Stadium, Limassol, Cyprus	63	Cyprus	4–2	4–2	Friendly

== Honours ==
Flora

- Meistriliiga: 2015, 2017, 2020, 2025
- Estonian Cup: 2012–13, 2015–16, 2019–20
- Estonian Supercup: 2014, 2016, 2020, 2021

Individual

- Estonian Footballer of the Year: 2020, 2021
- Estonian Young Footballer of the Year: 2015, 2018
- Meistriliiga Player of the Year: 2017, 2020, 2021, 2025
- Meistriliiga Fans' Player of the Year: 2015, 2017, 2020, 2025
- Meistriliiga Team of the Season: 2020
- Meistriliiga Top Scorer: 2017, 2020, 2025
- Meistriliiga Player of the Month: October 2015, June 2017, October 2025
