= Konstantin Nahk =

Estonian footballer

Personal information
- Full name: Konstantin Nahk
- Date of birth: 10 February 1975 (age 51)
- Place of birth: Tallinn, then part of Estonian SSR, Soviet Union
- Height: 1.82 m (6 ft 0 in)
- Position: Midfielder

Senior career*
Years	Team	Apps	(Gls)
1992–1993	Vigri Tallinn	32	(10)
1994–1998	Tallinna Sadam	90	(43)
1999–2000	Levadia Maardu	51	(14)
2001	Torpedo-MAZ Minsk	5	(0)
2002	Viljandi Tulevik	13	(2)
2002	Levadia Maardu	11	(4)
2003	Jokerit	22	(6)
2004–2011	Levadia Tallinn	225	(75)
2013–2014	Infonet Tallinn	57	(5)
Total		506	(159)
- * Club domestic league appearances and goals

Konstantin Nahk (born Konstantin Kolbassenko; 10 February 1975) is a retired Estonian professional footballer. He played as a central midfielder and was known for his set-piece ability. He had a spell abroad in the Veikkausliiga with FC Jokerit.

== Honours ==
=== Individual ===
- Meistriliiga Footballer of the Season: 2009

Awards
Preceded by Martin Vunk	Meistriliiga Footballer of the Season; 2009	Succeeded by Sander Post
