= Sergey Frantsev =

Russian football manager (born 1959)

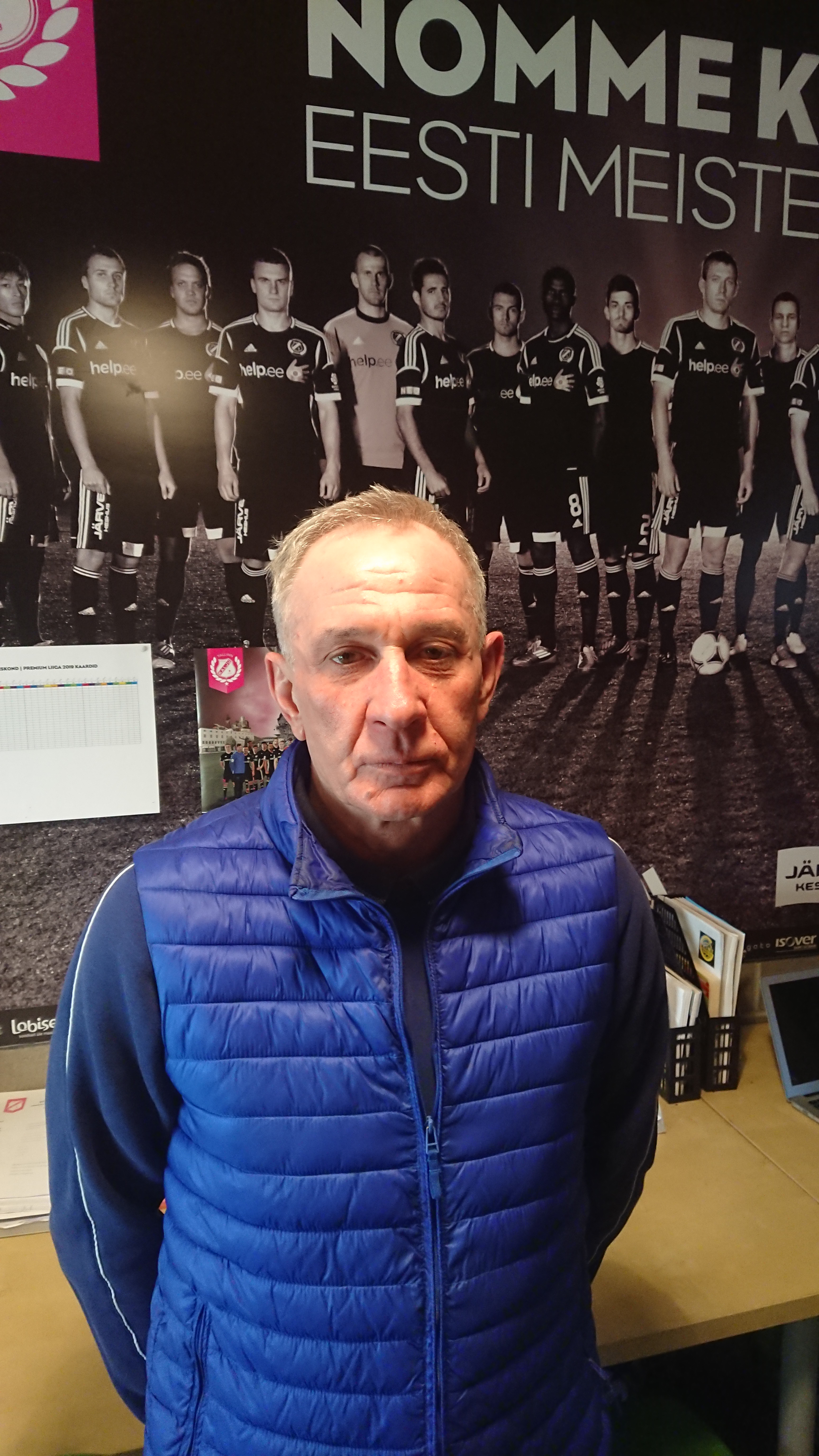

Personal information
- Full name: Sergey Sergeyevich Frantsev
- Date of birth: 17 March 1959 (age 67)
- Place of birth: Kursk, Russian SFSR

Team information
- Current team: Kirovetz-Voskhozhdeniye St. Petersburg

Youth career
- DYuSSh-3 Kursk

Senior career*
Years	Team	Apps	(Gls)
1978–1980	Avangard Kursk	0	(0)

Managerial career
- 1991: Kirovets Leningrad (assistant)
- 1991: Kirovets St. Petersburg
- 1991: Progress Chernyakhovsk (assistant)
- 1994–1996: Smena St. Petersburg (academy)
- 1995: Saturn-1991 St. Petersburg (assistant)
- 1996–1997: Metallurg Pikalyovo
- 1998–1999: Spartak-Orekhovo
- 2000: Torpedo-Kadino Mogilev (assistant)
- 2001: Torpedo-MAZ Minsk
- 2002: Dynamo-SPb St. Petersburg (assistant)
- 2002: Baltika-Tarko Kaliningrad
- 2003: Vorskla-Naftohaz Poltava (assistant)
- 2004: Shinnik Yaroslavl (assistant)
- 2005: Volga Nizhny Novgorod
- 2006: Rubin Kazan (reserves)
- 2006: Lokomotiv Moscow (assistant)
- 2007: Rostov (scout)
- 2008–2009: Rostov (assistant)
- 2010: Dynamo St. Petersburg
- 2011: Baltika Kaliningrad
- 2012–2013: Avangard Kursk
- 2014–2015: Sillamäe Kalev
- 2015–2019: Nõmme Kalju
- 2020–2021: Nõmme Kalju
- 2022–: Kirovetz-Voskhozhdeniye St. Petersburg
- * Club domestic league appearances and goals

Sergey Sergeyevich Frantsev (Russian: Серге́й Серге́евич Фра́нцев; born 17 March 1959) is a Russian professional football coach and a former player. He is the manager of Russian Amateur Football League club Kirovetz-Voskhozhdeniye St. Petersburg.

== Managerial career ==
=== Nõmme Kalju ===
On 5 November 2015, Frantsev was named as manager of the Estonian Meistriliiga club Nõmme Kalju. After finishing third both in 2016 and 2017 Frantsev and Kalju finally won the league title in 2018. Kalju also won the pre season Estonian Supercup in 2019. The club's best result under Frantsev in European competitions was the third qualifying round in the 2016–17 UEFA Europa League, beating Maccabi Haifa on the way. Frantsev was sacked on 25 April 2019 due to a poor start to the 2019 season.

== Honours ==
=== Individual ===
- Meistriliiga Manager of the Month: August 2014, October 2014, October 2016, July 2017, March 2019, June/July 2018,
