= Bohdan Smishko =

Ukrainian footballer

Personal information
- Full name: Bohdan Volodymyrovych Smishko
- Date of birth: 20 August 1978 (age 48)
- Place of birth: Cēsis, Latvian SSR, Soviet Union
- Height: 1.90 m (6 ft 3 in)
- Position: Defender

Youth career
- 19??–1991: Ventspils
- 1991–199?: Balta

Senior career*
Years	Team	Apps	(Gls)
2000	FC Dnister Ovidiopol	3	(0)
2000–2002	FC Chornomorets Odesa	56	(7)
2000–2002	→ FC Chornomorets-2 Odesa (loan)	21	(5)
2003	FC Zirka Kirovohrad	28	(2)
2003	→ Olimpiya FC AES Yuzhnoukrainsk (loan)	1	(1)
2004	FC Dnister Ovidiopol	3	(0)
2004–2005	FC Spartak Sumy	28	(4)
2005–2006	FC Zorya Luhansk	26	(10)
2006	FC Dnipro Cherkasy	5	(0)
2007–2008	MFC Mykolaiv	47	(8)
2008–2009	FC Dnister Ovidiopol	31	(2)
2009	PFC Oleksandriya	6	(0)
2010	FC Arsenal Bila Tserkva	18	(4)
2011–2012	FC Real Pharma Odesa	25	(2)
2013–2015	Ytterhogdals IK	46	(30)
2015	Myssjö-Ovikens IF	10	(10)
- * Club domestic league appearances and goals

Bohdan Smishko (Ukrainian: Богдан Володимирович Смішко; born 20 August 1978) is a Ukrainian former professional football defender. He is a brother of goalkeeper Roman Smishko.

Smishko started his football career at amateur level playing for FC Dnister Ovidiopol.
