= Juha Hakola =

Finnish footballer (born 1987)

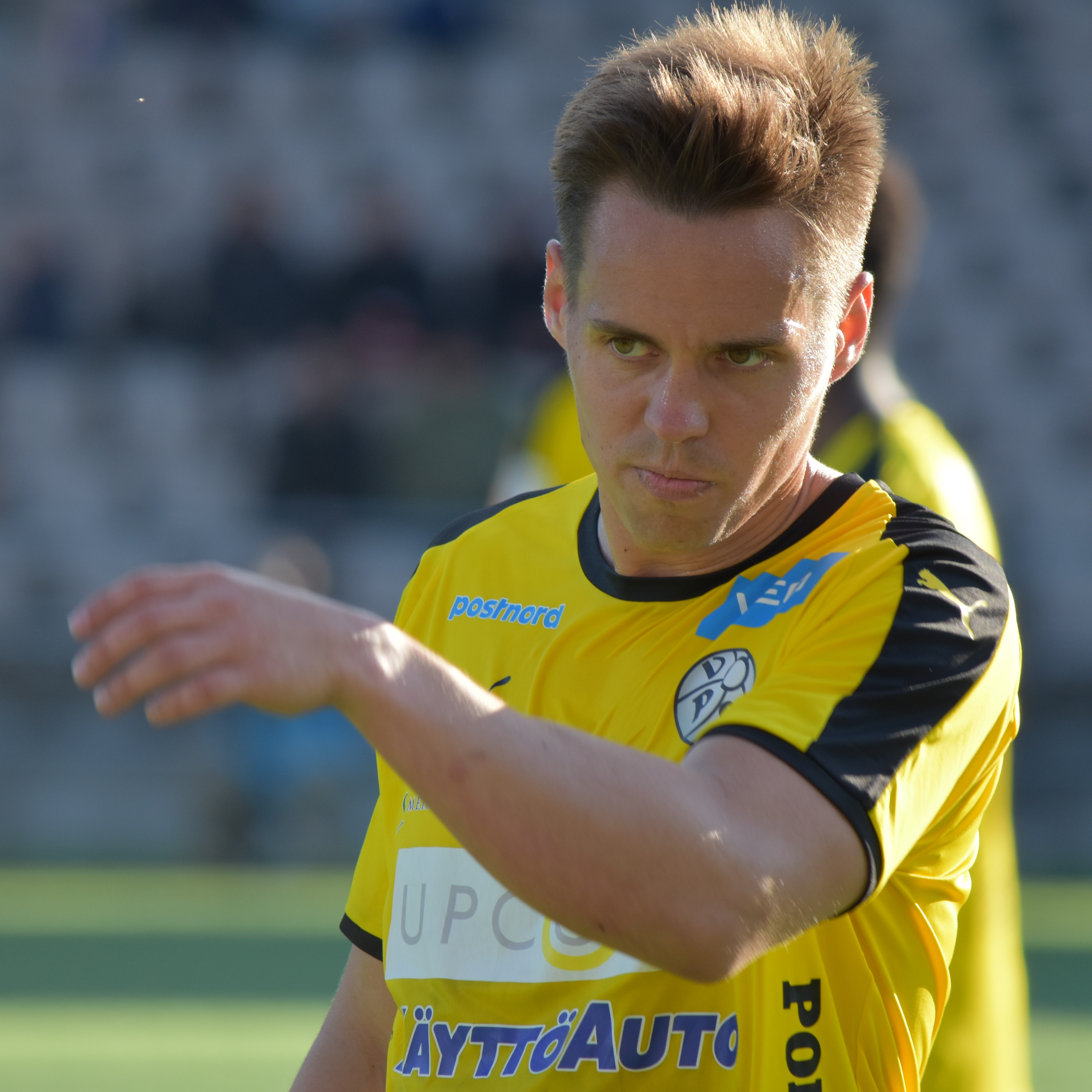
- Juha Hakola with VPS in 2018.

Personal information
- Full name: Juha Pekka Hakola
- Date of birth: 27 October 1987 (age 39)
- Place of birth: Espoo, Finland
- Height: 1.76 m (5 ft 9 in)
- Position: Winger

Team information
- Current team: Grankulla IFK
- Number: 7

Youth career
- −2006: HJK Helsinki

Senior career*
| Years | Team | Apps | (Gls) |
| 2006 | Klubi 04 | 2 | (0) |
| 2007–2008 | Flora | 65 | (25) |
| 2009–2010 | Heracles Almelo | 33 | (1) |
| 2010–2011 | Willem II | 17 | (3) |
| 2011–2013 | Ferencváros | 30 | (4) |
| 2013 | KuPS | 8 | (5) |
| 2014 | Aris Limassol | 11 | (1) |
| 2014–2016 | KuPS | 46 | (5) |
| 2017–2018 | VPS | 63 | (9) |
| 2019 | Honka | 24 | (5) |
| 2020– | GrIFK | 48 | (10) |

International career^{‡}
| 2007–2008 | Finland U21 | 8 | (0) |
| 2007–2009 | Finland U23 | 1 | (0) |
| 2009– | Finland | 1 | (0) |
- * Club domestic league appearances and goals as of 27 November 2021 ‡ National team caps and goals as of 12 February 2009

Juha Pekka Hakola (born 27 October 1987) is a Finnish professional footballer who plays as a winger for Grankulla IFK in the Kakkonen.

== Club career ==
Hakola played two seasons for FC Flora Tallinn. Hakola was named the Meistriliiga Footballer of the Year for his performances for Flora in 2007. In 2007, he also went on trial with RCD Espanyol. On 30 December it was announced that Hakola signed a 1.5-year contract with Heracles Almelo in the Dutch Eredivisie. He made his league debut for the new team on 17 January 2009 against ADO Den Haag. Hakola scored his first goal in Eredivisie from a freekick on 19 April 2009 against NAC Breda.

On 25 June 2010 Hakola signed a 2+1 year contract with Willem II. Next summer however, following Willem's relegation from Eredivisie, Hakola left the club and signed a two-year contract with Ferencváros in Hungary.

In 2013, he had a brief stint in his home country, playing for KuPS. Next year, Hakola signed a contract with Aris Limassol.

Hakola signed with FC Honka for the 2019 season. The deal was announced already on 15 November 2018.

In June 2020, Hakola signed with Grankulla IFK.

== International career ==
Hakola was nominated for the Finland national football team on 5 February 2009 for a friendly international match with Portugal, he entered as a substitute late in the game. He had been a member of the under 21 national team, and also has one cap for the under 23 team.

== Career statistics ==
As of 19 May 2024.

Appearances and goals by club, season and competition
| Club | Season | League | | | National cup (Note: Includes Suomen Cup, Estonian Cup, KNVB Beker and Hungarian Cup) | | League cup | | Continental | | Total | |
| Club | Season | Division | Apps | Goals | Apps | Goals | Apps | Goals | Apps | Goals | Apps | Goals |
|---|---|---|---|---|---|---|---|---|---|---|---|---|
| Klubi 04 | 2006 | Ykkönen | 2 | 0 | – | | – | | – | | 2 | 0 |
| Flora | 2007 | Meistriliiga | 30 | 14 | 1 | 2 | – | | 1 (Note: Includes UEFA Cup) | 0 | 32 | 16 |
| Flora | 2008 | Meistriliiga | 34 | 11 | 0 | 0 | – | | 2 | 0 | 36 | 11 |
| Flora | Total | | 64 | 25 | 1 | 2 | – | – | 3 | 0 | 68 | 27 |
| Heracles Almelo | 2008–09 | Eredivisie | 14 | 1 | – | | – | | – | | 14 | 1 |
| Heracles Almelo | 2009–10 | Eredivisie | 19 | 0 | 2 | 0 | – | | – | | 21 | 0 |
| Heracles Almelo | Total | | 33 | 1 | 2 | 0 | – | – | – | – | 35 | 1 |
| Willem II | 2010–11 | Eredivisie | 17 | 3 | – | | – | | – | | 17 | 3 |
| Ferencváros | 2011–12 | NB I | 19 | 3 | 2 | 0 | – | | – | | 21 | 3 |
| Ferencváros | 2012–13 | NB I | 11 | 1 | 0 | 0 | 4 | 0 | – | | 15 | 1 |
| Ferencváros | Total | | 30 | 4 | 2 | 0 | – | – | – | – | 32 | 4 |
| Ferencváros II | 2012–13 | NB II | 4 | 1 | – | | – | | – | | 4 | 1 |
| KuPS | 2013 | Veikkausliiga | 8 | 5 | 1 | 0 | 0 | 0 | 0 | 0 | 9 | 5 |
| Aris Limassol | 2013–14 | Cypriot First Division | 11 | 1 | 2 | 0 | – | | – | | 13 | 1 |
| KuPS | 2014 | Veikkausliiga | 7 | 1 | – | | – | | – | | 7 | 1 |
| KuPS | 2015 | Veikkausliiga | 9 | 2 | 2 | 1 | 0 | 0 | – | | 11 | 3 |
| KuPS | 2016 | Veikkausliiga | 29 | 2 | 2 | 1 | 4 | 1 | – | | 35 | 4 |
| KuPS | Total | | 42 | 5 | 4 | 2 | 4 | 1 | – | – | 50 | 8 |
| VPS | 2017 | Veikkausliiga | 33 | 3 | 6 | 1 | – | | 4 (Note: Includes UEFA Europa League) | 0 | 43 | 4 |
| VPS | 2018 | Veikkausliiga | 30 | 6 | 5 | 3 | – | | – | | 35 | 9 |
| VPS | Total | | 63 | 9 | 11 | 4 | – | – | 4 | 0 | 78 | 13 |
| Honka | 2019 | Veikkausliiga | 24 | 5 | 7 | 2 | – | | – | | 31 | 7 |
| GrIFK | 2020 | Kakkonen | 11 | 1 | – | | – | | – | | 11 | 1 |
| GrIFK | 2021 | Kakkonen | 12 | 2 | – | | – | | – | | 12 | 2 |
| GrIFK | 2022 | Kakkonen | 10 | 3 | 1 | 0 | – | | – | | 11 | 3 |
| GrIFK | 2023 | Kakkonen | 10 | 1 | 1 | 0 | – | | – | | 11 | 1 |
| GrIFK | 2024 | Kakkonen | 5 | 3 | 0 | 0 | – | | – | | 50 | 10 |
| GrIFK | Total | | 48 | 10 | 2 | 0 | – | – | 4 | 0 | 78 | 13 |
| Career total | | | 361 | 69 | 32 | 10 | 8 | 1 | 7 | 0 | 408 | 80 |

== Honours ==
Ferencváros

- Hungarian League Cup (1): 2012–13

=== Individual ===
- Meistriliiga Footballer of the Season: 2007

Awards
| Preceded by Marek Lemsalu | Meistriliiga Footballer of the Season; 2007 | Succeeded by Martin Vunk |
