= Aleksandr Pushtov =

Estonian footballer and coach

Personal information
- Date of birth: 9 March 1964 (age 62)
- Place of birth: Kaliningrad, Russian SFSR, USSR
- Height: 1.83 m (6 ft 0 in)
- Position: Defender

Senior career*
Years	Team	Apps	(Gls)
1980	Tempo		
1980–1983	Dynamo Vologda		
1983–1987	Elektrotehnik		
1987–1991	TVMK		
1991–1992	TP-Seinäjoki		
1992–1993	Nikol		
1994	Norma		
1995–1997	Tallinna Sadam		
1998–1999	Marlekor		
2000	Levadia		
2001–2004	Maardu		
2005	Lasnamäe Ajax		
2009–2010	Atletik		

International career
1992–1993	Estonia	10	(1)

Managerial career
- 2010–2011: Levadia
- 2011–2017: FCI Tallinn
- * Club domestic league appearances and goals

Aleksandr Pushtov (born 9 March 1964) is a football coach and a retired footballer from Estonia, who holds Russian citizenship. He was the manager of FCI Tallinn from 2011 to 2017. Under his management FCI climbed to the Estonian top tier, won their first Estonian championship in 2016, Estonian cup and Estonian Supercup in 2017 title.

== International career ==
Pushtov obtained a total number of ten caps for the Estonia national football team during the early 1990s, scoring one goal in Estonia's first (official) international match on 3 June 1992 against Slovenia.

== Honours ==
Individual

- Meistriliiga Manager of the Month: July 2014 March 2016, May 2016
