= Hindrek Ojamaa =

Estonian footballer (born 1995)

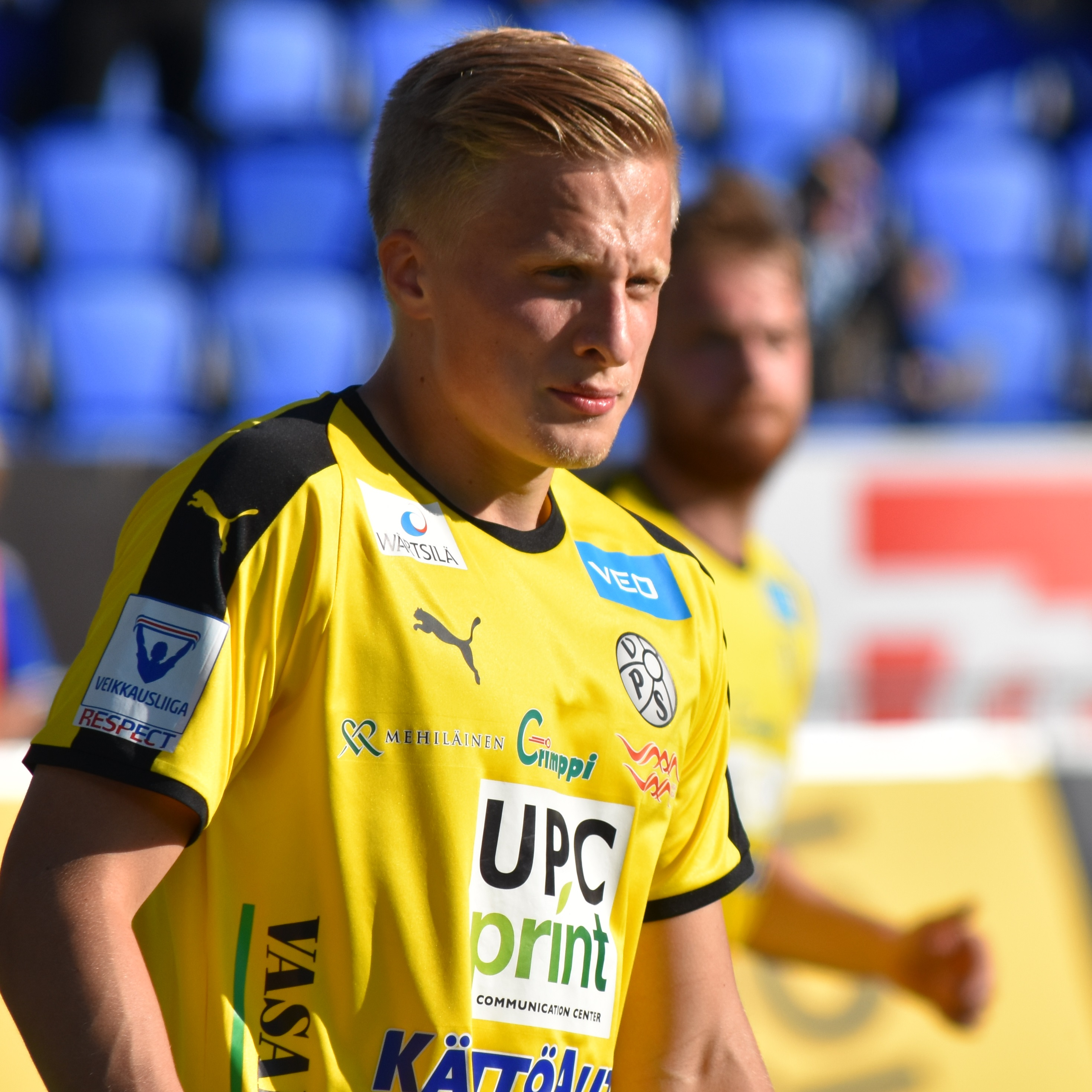
- Ojamaa with VPS in 2018

Personal information
- Full name: Hindrek Ojamaa
- Date of birth: 12 June 1995 (age 31)
- Place of birth: Tallinn, Estonia
- Height: 1.77 m (5 ft 9 1/2 in)
- Position: Right back

Team information
- Current team: Paide Linnameeskond
- Number: 15

Youth career
- 2003–2006: Kotkas Juunior
- 2007–2012: Levadia

Senior career*
| Years | Team | Apps | (Gls) |
| 2011–2012 | Levadia | 2 | (1) |
| 2011–2012 | Levadia II | 30 | (0) |
| 2013–2014 | Nõmme Kalju | 1 | (0) |
| 2013–2014 | Nõmme Kalju II | 34 | (6) |
| 2014 | Tammeka | 13 | (0) |
| 2015–2016 | Levadia | 38 | (0) |
| 2015–2016 | Levadia II | 24 | (3) |
| 2017 | JJK | 15 | (0) |
| 2018–2019 | VPS | 37 | (1) |
| 2020 | KTP | 20 | (1) |
| 2021– | Paide Linnameeskond | 87 | (4) |
| 2021– | Paide Linnameeskond II | 10 | (1) |
| 2025 | → Tallinna Kalev (loan) | 8 | (0) |

International career^{‡}
| 2010 | Estonia U16 | 2 | (0) |
| 2010–2011 | Estonia U17 | 16 | (1) |
| 2012 | Estonia U18 | 1 | (0) |
| 2013 | Estonia U19 | 1 | (0) |
| 2015–2016 | Estonia U21 | 16 | (0) |
| 2016–2018 | Estonia U23 | 3 | (0) |
| 2016– | Estonia | 6 | (0) |
- * Club domestic league appearances and goals as of 24 July 2026 ‡ National team caps and goals as of 26 June 2023

Hindrek Ojamaa (born 12 June 1995) is an Estonian professional footballer who plays as a right back for Estonian club Paide Linnameeskond and the Estonia national team.

== Club career ==
=== Levadia ===
Ojamaa first played for Kotkas Junior, and joined the Levadia youth academy in 2006 when Kotkas Junior merged with Levadia. He made his debut in the Meistriliiga on 10 September 2011, in a 6–0 home victory over Ajax and scored his first Meistriliiga goal three days later, in a 7–0 away win over the same team.

=== Nõmme Kalju ===
On 1 March 2013, Ojamaa signed a three-year contract with Nõmme Kalju. He mainly played for the club's reserve side, Nõmme Kalju II, making only a single Meistriliiga appearance for the first team.

=== Tammeka ===
On 18 July 2014, Ojamaa joined Tammeka for the remainder of the 2014 season.

=== Return to Levadia ===
On 5 March 2015, Ojamaa returned to Levadia on a two-year contract.

=== JJK ===
On 20 July 2017, Ojamaa joined Finnish Veikkausliiga club JJK for the remainder of the 2017 season. He made his debut in the Veikkausliiga on 23 July 2017, in a 1–1 away draw against VPS.

=== VPS ===
On 16 December 2017, Ojamaa signed a two-year contract with VPS.

=== Paide Linnameeskond ===
On 3 January 2021, Ojamaa returned to Estonia signing for Paide Linnameeskond.

== International career ==
Ojamaa began his youth career in 2010 with the under-16 team. He also represented the under-17, under-18, under-19, under-21, and under-23 national sides.

Ojamaa made his senior international debut for Estonia on 6 January 2016, in a 1–1 draw against Sweden in a friendly.

== Personal life ==
Ojamaa has two older brothers. Henrik is also a professional footballer, while Harri ended his football career at the age of 19 due to an injury and is now a sports agent.
