= Gert Olesk =

Estonian footballer

Personal information
- Full name: Gert Olesk
- Date of birth: 8 August 1973 (age 53)
- Place of birth: Pärnu, then part of Estonian SSR, Soviet Union
- Height: 1.78 m (5 ft 10 in)
- Position: Defender

Senior career*
Years	Team	Apps	(Gls)
1993–1995	Flora	5	(0)
1993–1996	Tervis Pärnu	36	(4)
1997	Lelle	15	(2)
1997–2000	Tulevik	87	(3)
2001–2002	Elva	22	(1)
2003–2007	Vaprus	77	(5)
2009–2010	Vaprus	1	(0)

International career
1994–2000	Estonia	13	(0)

Managerial career
- 2009: Vaprus
- 2010: Pärnu Linnameeskond
- 2013–2014: Pärnu Linnameeskond
- 2014–2017: Pärnu Linnameeskond (assistant)
- 2020–2022: Pärnu JK (assistant)
- 2022–: Pärnu JK
- * Club domestic league appearances and goals

Gert Olesk (born 8 August 1973) is an Estonian football coach and former professional player. He played the position of defender.

== International career ==
Olesk has made a total of 13 appearances for the Estonia national team. He made his international debut in 1994.

== Managerial career ==
Olesk was the head coach of Pärnu Linnameeskond and led the team to Estonian top-tier Meistriliiga.

He has worked for Pärnu JK as assistant coach and youth coach.

In November 2022, Olesk was appointed the head coach of Pärnu JK.
