= Roman Smishko =

Ukrainian footballer

Personal information
- Full name: Roman Volodymyrovych Smishko
- Date of birth: 18 March 1983 (age 43)
- Place of birth: Cēsis, Latvian SSR, Soviet Union
- Height: 1.99 m (6 ft 6 1/2 in)
- Position: Goalkeeper

Youth career
- 1999–2000: Chornomorets Odesa

Senior career*
Years	Team	Apps	(Gls)
2000	Chornomorets-2 Odesa	0	(0)
2001	Portovyk Illichivsk	3	(0)
2002–2004	Dnister Ovidiopol	26	(0)
2005	Enerhiya Yuzhnoukrainsk	12	(0)
2005	Zirka Kirovohrad	14	(0)
2006	Kryvbas Kryvyi Rih	0	(0)
2007	Smorgon	10	(0)
2008	Vetra Vilnius	13	(0)
2009	Mykolaiv	5	(0)
2010	Neftchi Kochkor-Ata	12	(0)
2011–2014	Levadia Tallinn	133	(1)
2015	Narva Trans	28	(0)
2016	Maardu Linnameeskond	0	(0)
2017	Maardu Aliens		
2018	FCI Tallinn	1	(0)
- * Club domestic league appearances and goals as of 31 December 2018

Roman Volodymyrovych Smishko (Ukrainian: Роман Володимирович Смішко; born 18 March 1983) is a retired Ukrainian professional footballer who played as a goalkeeper.

He is a younger brother of Ukrainian defender Bohdan Smishko.

== Career ==
He played for clubs in Estonian, Lithuanian and Belarusian top levels.

In the 2014 Meistriliiga season he set the league clean sheet record by not conceding a single goal for 1,281 minutes between 5 April 2014 and 25 July 2014 which is 30 minutes short and allegedly the second best result in countries top flight after Edwin Van der Sar's 1,311 minutes.

== Honours ==
Individual

- Meistriliiga Player of the Month: September 2014
