= Karl Palatu =

Estonian footballer

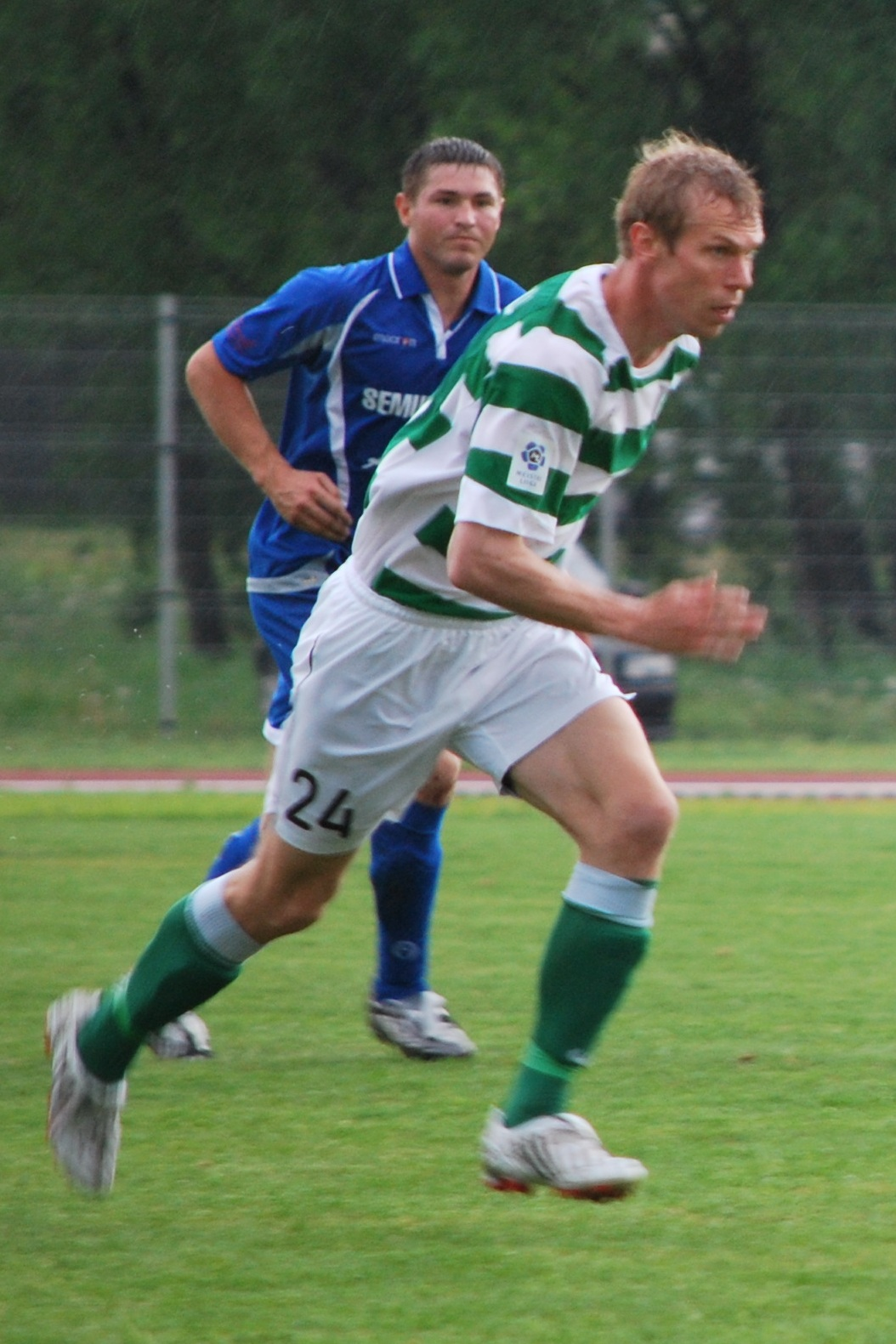
- Palatu with Flora in 2009

Personal information
- Full name: Karl Palatu
- Date of birth: 5 December 1982 (age 43)
- Place of birth: Pärnu, then part of Estonian SSR, Soviet Union
- Height: 1.85 m (6 ft 1 in)
- Position: Defender

Senior career*
Years	Team	Apps	(Gls)
1999	Tervis Pärnu		
2000–2002	Levadia Pärnu		
2002	→ FC Levadia Maardu	5	(0)
2003	Valga	10	(0)
2004–2005	Tulevik	38	(1)
2004	→ Elva (loan)	2	(0)
2005	→ Flora (loan)	8	(0)
2006	Flora	22	(1)
2007	Sogndal	0	(0)
2008–2014	Flora	155	(21)
2014–2015	Paide Linnameeskond	27	(3)
2015–2016	Pärnu Linnameeskond	56	(2)
2017–2018	Vaprus	33	(1)

International career^{‡}
2001–2003	Estonia U21	9	(0)
2010–2012	Estonia	9	(0)
- * Club domestic league appearances and goals as of 11:32, 1 March 2019 (UTC) ‡ National team caps and goals as of 21 February 2014

Karl Palatu (born 5 December 1982) is a retired Estonian professional footballer. He played the position of defender.

== International career ==
He made the debut for Estonian national team on 21 May 2010.
