= Janar Toomet =

Estonian footballer

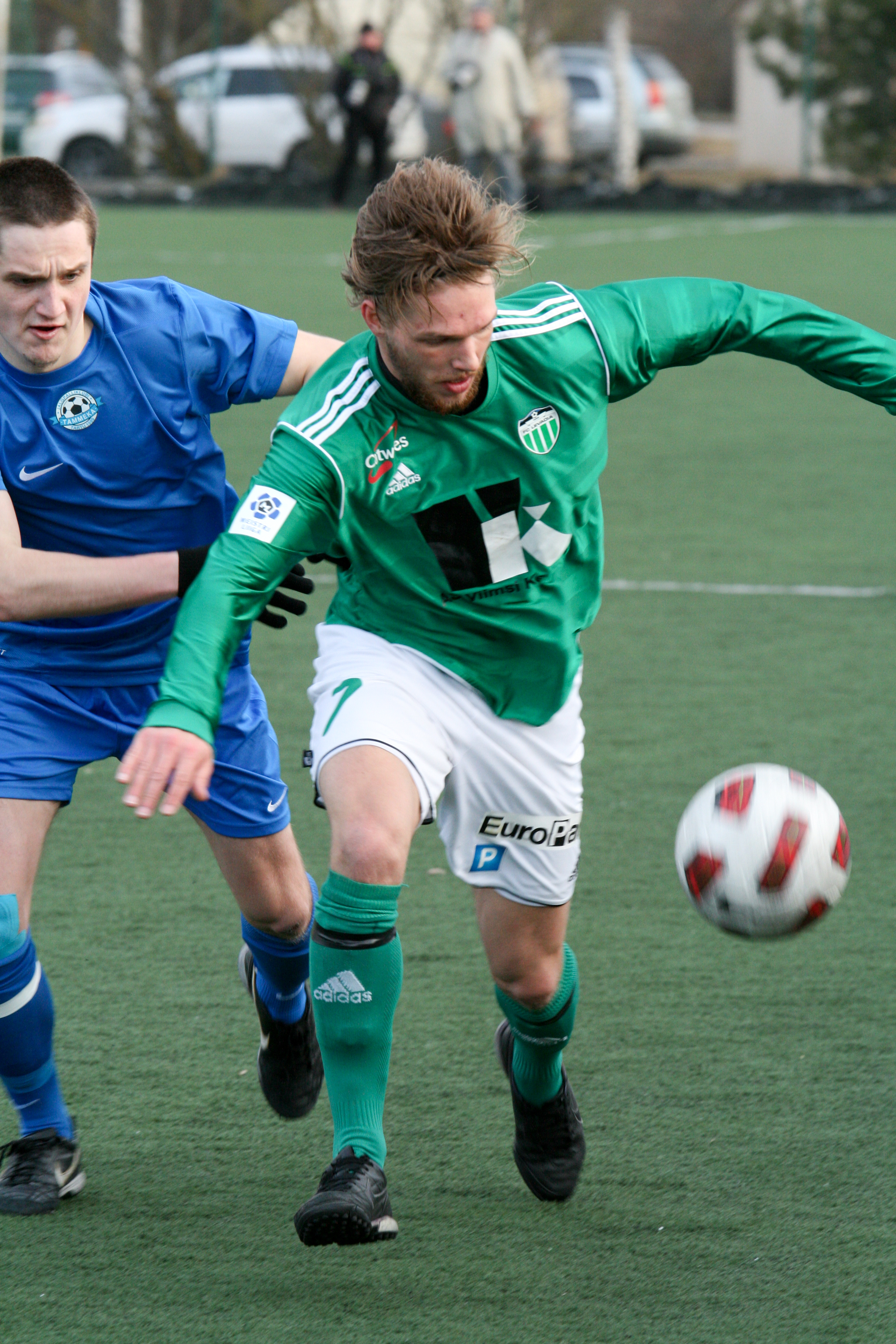
- Toomet (right) in 2012

Personal information
- Full name: Janar Toomet
- Date of birth: 10 August 1989 (age 37)
- Place of birth: Tallinn, then part of Estonian SSR, Soviet Union
- Height: 1.78 m (5 ft 10 in)
- Position: Midfielder

Youth career
- 2002–2005: Flora

Senior career*
Years	Team	Apps	(Gls)
2006–2008	Flora II	42	(8)
2007	→ Warrior (loan)	26	(11)
2008	→ Warrior (loan)	14	(9)
2009	→ Tulevik II (loan)	8	(1)
2010	→ Warrior (loan)	1	(2)
2009–2010	→ Tulevik (loan)	30	(3)
2011–2012	Levadia II	17	(8)
2011–2012	Levadia	46	(15)
2014	Nõmme Kalju II	1	(0)
2013–2014	Nõmme Kalju	44	(7)
2015	Sillamäe Kalev	35	(2)
2016	Paide Linnameeskond	12	(0)
2016–2017	Nõmme Kalju U21	1	(0)
2016–2017	Nõmme Kalju	33	(5)
2022–2024	Viimsi JK	56	(9)

International career
2007	Estonia U19	4	(0)
2008	Estonia U21	2	(0)
2011–2012	Estonia U23	3	(0)
2016–2017	Estonia	5	(0)
- * Club domestic league appearances and goals as of 24 April 2026

Janar Toomet (born 10 August 1989) is an Estonian former footballer.

He retired in 2017 after an injury, but after 5-year break returned in 2022 as amateur with Viimsi JK.

== Club career ==
=== Flora ===
Toomet began playing football at Flora youth academy. He made his senior league debut in the Esiliiga for the club's reserve side, Flora II, on 11 March 2006, in a 0–2 home loss to Nõmme Kalju. Unable to break into the Flora's first team, Toomet spent time on loan at Warrior and Tulevik. He made his debut in the Meistriliiga on 4 April 2009, in a 1–1 draw against Narva Trans.

=== Levadia ===
In 2011, Toomet signed for Levadia. He won the 2011–12 Estonian Cup.

=== Nõmme Kalju ===
On 24 February 2013, Toomet signed a three-year contract with Nõmme Kalju.

=== Sillamäe Kalev ===
On 20 February 2015, Toomet signed for Sillamäe Kalev.

=== Paide Linnameeskond ===
On 1 March 2016, Toomet joined Paide Linnameeskond.

=== Return to Nõmme Kalju ===
On 21 July 2016, Toomet returned to Nõmme Kalju, signing a contract until the end of the season. On 6 December 2016, he signed a contract extension keeping him at the club until 2017.

== International career ==
Toomet began his youth career in 2007. He represented the under-19, under-21, and under-23 national sides, making nine youth appearances overall.

Toomet made his debut for the senior national team on 19 November 2016, in a 1–1 away draw against Saint Kitts and Nevis in a friendly.

== Honours ==
=== Club ===
Levadia

- Estonian Cup: 2011–12
