= Mikk Reintam =

Estonian footballer

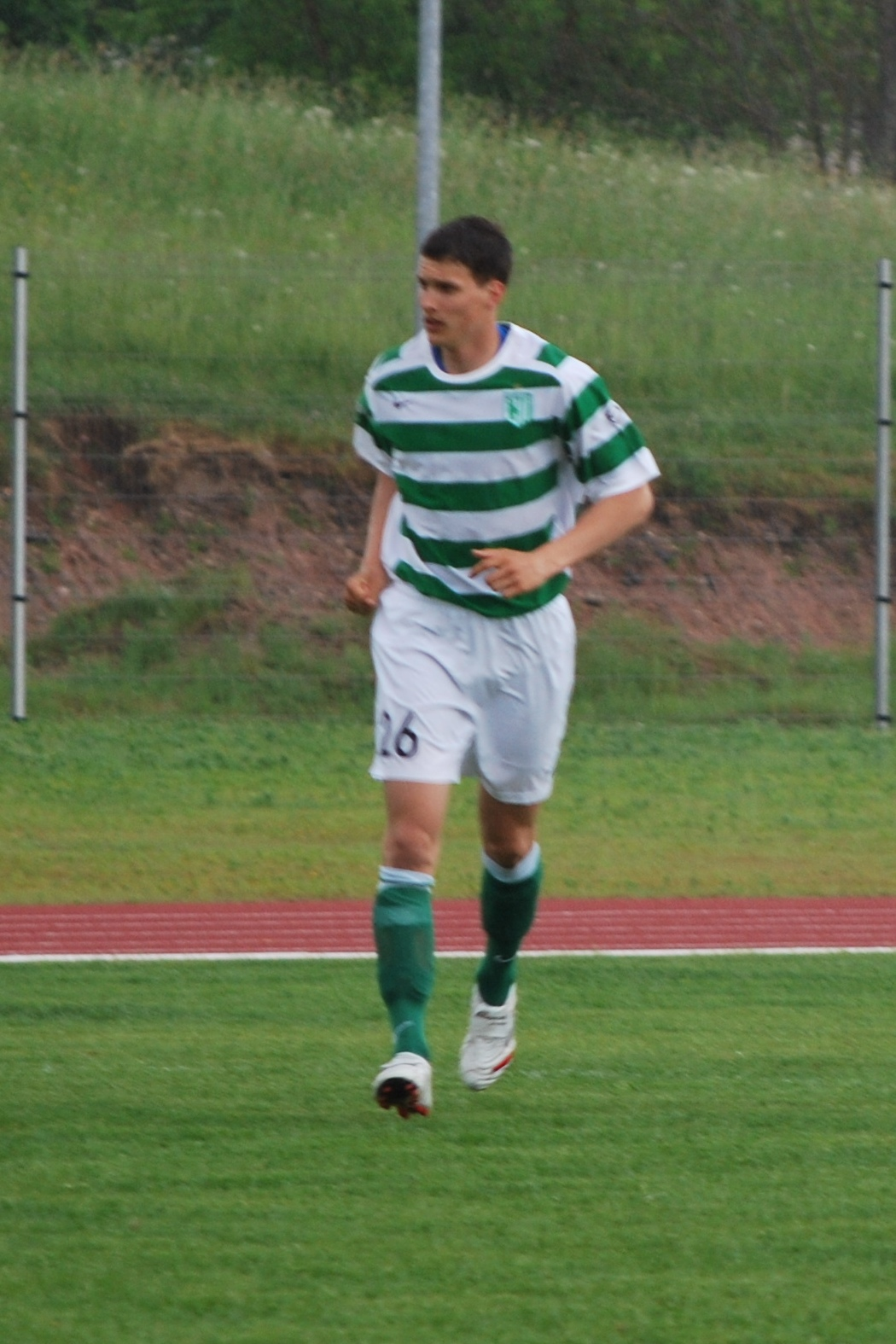
- Reintam with Flora in 2009

Personal information
- Full name: Mikk Reintam
- Date of birth: 22 May 1990 (age 36)
- Place of birth: Tallinn, Estonia
- Height: 1.91 m (6 ft 3 in)
- Position: Centre back

Youth career
- 2002–2008: Flora

Senior career*
Years	Team	Apps	(Gls)
2007–2008	Warrior	48	(1)
2009–2010	Flora II	27	(1)
2009–2010	Flora	21	(2)
2010	→ Tulevik (loan)	14	(2)
2011–2013	JJK	74	(2)
2014	Nõmme Kalju II	2	(0)
2014	Nõmme Kalju	18	(2)
2015	Frýdek-Místek	7	(0)
2015–2016	Alloa Athletic	12	(0)
2016–2019	Třinec	65	(6)
2019–2021	Nõmme Kalju	43	(3)

International career
2007	Estonia U18	1	(0)
2008–2009	Estonia U19	10	(0)
2011–2012	Estonia U21	12	(0)
2013–2014	Estonia U23	2	(0)
2011–2018	Estonia	12	(0)
- * Club domestic league appearances and goals

Mikk Reintam (born 22 May 1990) is a retired Estonian professional footballer who last played as a centre back for Meistriliiga club Nõmme Kalju FC. Internationally he played for the Estonia national team in 12 matches.

== Club career ==
=== Flora ===
Reintam came through the youth system at Flora and played for the club's affiliates Warrior. He made his debut for Flora's first team on 3 March 2009, against Levadia in the Estonian Supercup, and scored the first goal of a 2–1 win. Reintam made his debut in the Meistriliiga on 7 March 2009, and scored the only goal of an away win against Nõmme Kalju.

In July 2010, Reintam moved to Tulevik on loan until the end of the 2010 season.

=== JJK ===
On 7 March 2011, Reintam signed a three-year contract with Finnish club JJK. He made his debut in the Veikkausliiga on 12 May 2011, in a 2–1 away victory over RoPS. His club finished the 2011 season in third place, their highest position in history.

=== Nõmme Kalju ===
On 15 February 2014, Reintam signed a one-year contract with Meistriliiga club Nõmme Kalju. He was named Player of the Month for April 2014.

=== Frýdek-Místek ===
In April 2015, Reintam signed for Czech National League club Frýdek-Místek.

=== Alloa Athletic ===
On 7 July 2015, Reintam signed a one-year contract with Scottish Championship club Alloa Athletic. He made his debut for the club on 1 August 2015 in a Scottish League Cup match against Berwick Rangers, losing the game 2–3 in extra time. Reintam made his debut in the Scottish Championship on 8 August 2015, in a 1–3 away loss to Queen of the South. He failed to establish himself in the first team squad after new manager Jack Ross took over in December 2015, and on 24 March 2016 his contract was terminated by mutual agreement.

=== Třinec ===
In April 2016, Reintam signed for Czech National League club Třinec.

== International career ==
Reintam began his international career for Estonia with the national under-18 team in 2007, and went on to represent the under-19, under-21, and under-23 national sides.

On 25 May 2011, Reintam made an unofficial senior debut for Estonia, in a 1–2 home loss to Basque Country in a non-FIFA match. On 10 June 2011, he was named by manager Tarmo Rüütli in the Estonia squad to face Chile and Uruguay in friendly matches. Reintam made his senior international debut on 19 June 2011, in a 0–4 away loss to Chile.

== Career statistics ==
=== Club ===
As of 28 May 2018.

Appearances and goals by club, season and competition
Club	Season	League			Cup (Note: Includes the Estonian Cup, Finnish Cup, Scottish Cup and Czech Cup)		League Cup (Note: Includes the Finnish League Cup and Scottish League Cup)		Europe		Other		Total	
Club	Season	Division	Apps	Goals	Apps	Goals	Apps	Goals	Apps	Goals	Apps	Goals	Apps	Goals
Warrior	2007	Esiliiga	18	0	0	0	—		—		—		18	0
Warrior	2008	Esiliiga	30	1	2	0	—		—		—		32	1
Warrior	Total		48	1	2	0	—		—		—		50	1
Flora II	2009	Esiliiga	8	0	0	0	—		—		—		8	0
Flora II	2010	Esiliiga	19	1	0	0	—		—		—		19	1
Flora II	Total		27	1	0	0	—		—		—		27	1
Flora	2009	Meistriliiga	21	2	4	1	—		0	0	3 (Note: One appearance and one goal in Estonian Supercup, two appearances in Baltic League)	1	28	4
Flora	2010	Meistriliiga	0	0	0	0	—		0	0	0	0	0	0
Flora	Total		21	2	4	1	—		0	0	3	1	28	4
Tulevik (loan)	2010	Meistriliiga	14	2	2	0	—		—		—		16	2
JJK	2011	Veikkausliiga	25	2	0	0	5	0	—		—		30	2
JJK	2012	Veikkausliiga	17	0	0	0	2	1	4 (Note: Appearances in UEFA Europa League)	0	—		23	1
JJK	2013	Veikkausliiga	32	0	3	0	8	0	—		—		43	0
JJK	Total		74	2	3	0	15	1	4	0	—		96	3
Nõmme Kalju II	2014	Esiliiga	2	0	—		—		—		—		2	0
Nõmme Kalju	2014	Meistriliiga	18	2	3	1	—		2	0	—		23	3
Frýdek-Místek	2014–15	Czech National League	7	0	0	0	—		—		—		7	0
Alloa Athletic	2015–16	Scottish Championship	12	0	1	0	1	0	—		1 (Note: Appearance in Scottish Challenge Cup)	0	15	0
Třinec	2015–16	Czech National League	5	0	0	0	—		—		—		5	0
Třinec	2016–17	Czech National League	23	2	2	1	—		—		—		25	3
Třinec	2017–18	Czech National League	29	3	3	1	—		—		—		32	4
Třinec	Total		57	5	5	2	—		—		—		62	7
Career total			280	15	20	4	16	1	6	0	4	1	326	21

=== International ===
As of 25 December 2018.

Appearances and goals by national team and year
National team	Year	Apps	Goals
Estonia
Estonia	2011	2	0
Estonia	2013	8	0
Estonia	2014	1	0
Estonia	2018	1	0
Total		12	0

== Honours ==
=== Club ===
Flora

- Estonian Cup: 2008–09
- Estonian Supercup: 2009

=== Individual ===
- Meistriliiga Player of the Month: April 2014
