= Martin Vunk =

Estonian footballer

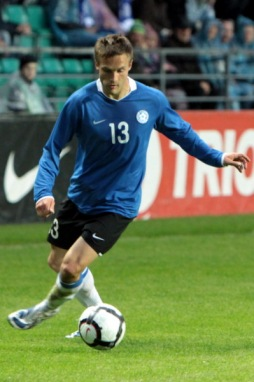
- Vunk with Estonia in 2010

Personal information
- Full name: Martin Vunk
- Date of birth: 21 August 1984 (age 42)
- Place of birth: Tartu, then part of Estonian SSR, Soviet Union
- Height: 1.82 m (5 ft 11 1/2 in)
- Position: Midfielder

Senior career*
Years	Team	Apps	(Gls)
1999	Lelle		
2000–2001	Kuressaare	4	(0)
2001	Tervis	21	(1)
2002–2010	Flora	114	(24)
2002–2004	→ Warrior (loan)	48	(5)
2005	→ Tervis (loan)	5	(0)
2010	→ Syrianska (loan)	8	(0)
2011–2012	Nea Salamis Famagusta	28	(3)
2012	Panachaiki	10	(0)
2013	Sillamäe Kalev	32	(6)
2014	Nõmme Kalju	26	(4)
2015	Persija Jakarta	3	(0)
2015–2016	Pärnu Linnameeskond	42	(5)
2017	Vaprus	10	(1)
2019	Vaprus	3	(0)

International career
1999–2000	Estonia U16	2	(0)
2000	Estonia U17	1	(0)
2001–2002	Estonia U19	5	(0)
2002	Estonia U20	2	(0)
2002–?	Estonia U21	14	(0)
2008–2014	Estonia	67	(1)
- * Club domestic league appearances and goals

Martin Vunk (born 21 August 1984) is a retired Estonian professional footballer who played as a midfielder.

== Club career ==
Vunk was named the Meistriliiga Player of the Year for his performances for Flora in 2008. On 21 November 2009, he signed a two-year loan deal with Syrianska. On 5 January 2011, he signed a one-and-a-half-year contract with Nea Salamis Famagusta, previously released for that deal by Flora. On 25 July 2012, he signed a two-year contract with the Greek club Panachaiki.

On 9 February 2013, he signed a one-year contract with Sillamäe Kalev.

On 22 February 2014, he signed a one-year contract with Nõmme Kalju.

On 9 December 2014, he signed a one-year contract with Persija Jakarta. However, due to financial trouble the 2015 Indonesia Super League season was cancelled and in the end of May Vunk released himself of the contract.

== International career ==
On 27 February 2008, he debuted for Estonia in a friendly match against Poland, when he came on as a substitute in the 67th minute. He instantly became a regular and was the only player to appear in all 14 matches for the team in that year. On 6 September 2011, Vunk scored his first International goal for Estonia in a 4–1 victory over Northern Ireland after being very close to his first international goal in the previous game against Slovenia.

== Career statistics ==
=== International ===
Appearances and goals by national team and year
National team	Year	Apps	Goals
Estonia	2008	14	0
Estonia	2009	9	0
Estonia	2010	7	0
Estonia	2011	10	1
Estonia	2012	11	0
Estonia	2013	9	0
Estonia	2014	7	0
Total		67	1

Scores and results list Estonia's goal tally first, score column indicates score after each Vunk goal.

List of international goals scored by Martin Vunk
No.	Date	Venue	Opponent	Score	Result	Competition
1	6 September 2011	A. Le Coq Arena, Tallinn, Estonia	Northern Ireland	1–0	4–1	UEFA Euro 2012 qualification

== Honours ==
=== Club ===
Flora

- Meistriliiga: 2002
- Estonian Cup: 2008–09, 2008–09
- Estonian Supercup: 2002

Syrianska

- Superettan: 2010

=== Individual ===
- Meistriliiga Player of the Year: 2008

Awards
Preceded by Juha Hakola	Meistriliiga Player of the Year; 2008	Succeeded by Konstantin Nahk
