= Igor Subbotin =

Estonian footballer

Personal information
- Full name: Igor Subbotin
- Date of birth: 26 June 1990 (age 36)
- Place of birth: Tallinn, Estonia
- Height: 1.87 m (6 ft 1 1/2 in)
- Position: Midfielder

Team information
- Current team: Nõmme Kalju U21
- Number: 15

Youth career
- Levadia

Senior career*
Years	Team	Apps	(Gls)
2007–2014	Levadia II	99	(14)
2009–2015	Levadia	151	(59)
2015	Mladá Boleslav	1	(0)
2015–2016	Levadia	19	(6)
2015	Levadia II	1	(0)
2016	Miedź Legnica	11	(0)
2016–2024	Nõmme Kalju	229	(48)
2022–	Nõmme Kalju U21	71	(21)

International career
2008–2009	Estonia U19	24	(2)
2010–2012	Estonia U21	13	(0)
2013–2014	Estonia U23	3	(1)
2014–2016	Estonia	5	(0)
- * Club domestic league appearances and goals as of 17 November 2026

Igor Subbotin (born 26 June 1990) is an Estonian international footballer who plays as a midfielder for Estonian Esiliiga club Nõmme Kalju U21.

== Club career ==
=== Levadia ===
Subbotin made his debut for Levadia in 2009. He won his first Meistriliiga title with Levadia in the 2009 season and two more in the 2013 and the 2014 seasons.

== International career ==
Subbotin made his international debut for Estonia on 31 May 2014 against Finland.

== Honours ==
Levadia

- Meistriliiga: 2009, 2013, 2014
- Estonian Cup: 2009–10, 2011–12, 2013–14
- Estonian Supercup: 2010, 2013

Nõmme Kalju

- Meistriliiga: 2018
- Estonian Supercup: 2019

Individual

- Meistriliiga Fans Player of the Year: 2014
