= Sakari Tukiainen =

Finnish footballer (born 1991)

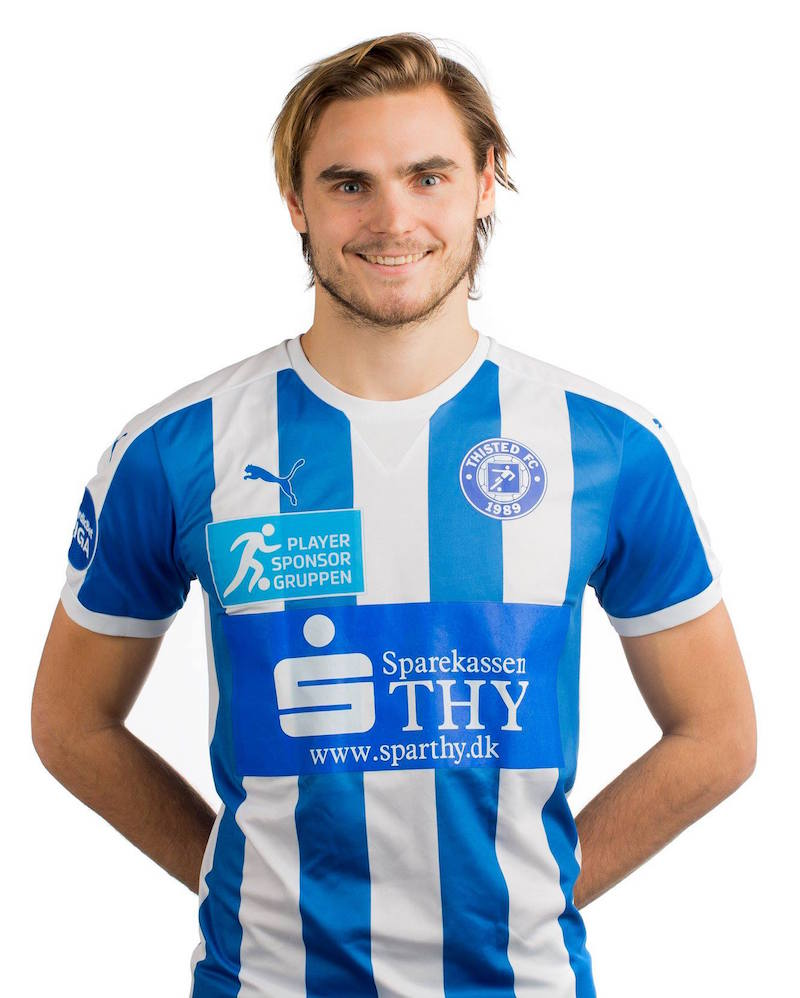
- Tukiainen with Thisted in 2018

Personal information
- Date of birth: 2 October 1991 (age 35)
- Place of birth: Helsinki, Finland
- Height: 1.90 m (6 ft 3 in)
- Position: Striker

Team information
- Current team: Udon United
- Number: 9

Youth career
- 1997–2008: EPS

Senior career*
Years	Team	Apps	(Gls)
2013	CLE	?	(30)
2014	Atlantis	29	(40)
2015–2016	Flora U21	6	(3)
2015–2016	Flora	40	(18)
2015	→ Tulevik (loan)	16	(6)
2017–2018	RoPS	26	(3)
2018–2019	Thisted	44	(17)
2019–2021	HIFK	36	(11)
2021–2022	Boeung Ket	27	(11)
2023	HIFK	11	(2)
2024	JäPS	10	(4)
2025	Manchego Ciudad Real	14	(8)
2025–	Udon United	12	(11)
- * Club domestic league appearances and goals as of 6 February 2025

Sakari Tukiainen (born 2 October 1991) is a Finnish striker who plays for Thai League 3 club Udon United.

== Club career ==
Tukiainen began his career with Finnish youth academy Espoon Palloseura (EPS), where he played from 1997 until 2008 when he quit the game. At EPS, Tukiainen played as a defender. He stopped playing football at the age of 17 due to lack of motivation.

After a five-year break, his friend encouraged him to play for Club Latino Español who were playing in the 7th Division in Helsinki. Club Latino Español in Helsinki who were then coached by Paraguayan Rodrigo Acosta. Acosta saw a striker in Tukiainen, and he was their best in 2013 with 30 goals.

In January 2014, he moved to neighboring club Atlantis FC, who were playing in the Finnish Kakkonen and coached by the Brazilian Alan Arruda. He started with the reserve team, but joined the first team during the preseason. His goal star continued to be brilliant in Atlantis, as during the 2014 Kakkonen season Tukiainen scored 40 goals in 27 games and broke the single-season record of Kakkonen, which was formerly owned by Pasi Nevanperä and Joel Pohjanpalo with 33 goals.

In November 2014, Tukiainen went to a test camp at the Allsvenskan AIK, where he scored two goals in him only test game, but ended up not joining AIK. In December 2014, he was bought to Estonia to Flora Tallinn, one of the most successful clubs in the country. He played with Flora and was also loaned to JK Tulevik Viljandi for a brief period.

He signed with Veikkausliiga club Rovaniemen Palloseura (RoPS) in 2017. RoPS already had several experienced strikers, and Tukiainen did not get to feature prominently until the end of the season.

He signed with Danish club Thisted in January 2018. In the 2018–2019 season, he became the top scorer for that season with 10 goals, and an additional 3 in the DBU cup.

He is an avid futsal player who played both futsal and football for much of his career. He also has a rank of Second Lieutenant having served in the Finnish Army for one year.

He signed for Thisted in 2018 after they sold their top striker Mikkel Agger to Norway's Sarpsborg 08.

In March 2022, he signed with Cambodian Premier League club Boeung Ket.

== Career statistics ==
As of 6 February 2025

Appearances and goals by club, season and competition
Club	Season	League			Cup (Note: Includes Suomen Cup, Estonian Cup and Danish Cup)		Other		Total	
Club	Season	Division	Apps	Goals	Apps	Goals	Apps	Goals	Apps	Goals
CLE	2013	Kutonen	17	30	–		–		17	30
Atlantis	2014	Kakkonen	29	40	1	0	–		30	40
Flora Tallinn	2015	Meistriliiga	14	4	2	2	1 (Note: Appearance(s) in UEFA Europa League)	0	17	6
Flora Tallinn	2016	Meistriliiga	26	14	5	4	0	0	31	18
Flora Tallinn	Total		40	18	7	6	1	0	48	24
Flora U21	2015	Esiliiga	3	1	–		–		3	1
Flora U21	2016	Esiliiga	3	2	–		–		3	2
Flora U21	Total		6	3	0	0	0	0	6	3
Tulevik (loan)	2015	Meistriliiga	16	6	3	7	–		19	13
RoPS	2017	Veikkausliiga	26	3	6	2	–		32	5
Thisted	2017–18	Danish 1st Division	13	4	–		–		13	4
Thisted	2018–19	Danish 1st Division	31	13	1	3	–		32	16
Thisted	Total		44	17	1	3	0	0	45	20
HIFK	2019	Veikkausliiga	13	5	–		–		13	5
HIFK	2020	Veikkausliiga	20	5	5	0	–		25	5
HIFK	2021	Veikkausliiga	3	1	5	0	–		8	1
HIFK	Total		36	11	10	0	0	0	46	11
Boeung Ket	2022	Cambodian Premier League	27	11	–		–		27	11
HIFK	2023	Ykkönen	11	2	2	0	–		13	2
JäPS	2024	Ykkösliiga	10	4	–		–		10	4
Manchego Ciudad Real	2024–25	Tercera Federación	1	1	0	0	–		1	1
Career total			263	146	30	18	1	0	294	164
