= Giorgio Di Vicino =

Italian professional footballer

Personal information
- Date of birth: 16 July 1980 (age 46)
- Place of birth: Naples, Italy
- Height: 1.70 m (5 ft 7 in)
- Position: Midfielder

Team information
- Current team: Melfi

Youth career
- 1997–1999: Napoli

Senior career*
Years	Team	Apps	(Gls)
1999–2001	Napoli	6	(0)
1999–2000	→ SPAL (loan)	29	(3)
2001	→ Crotone (loan)	11	(1)
2001–2004	Salernitana	68	(11)
2002–2003	→ Lecce (loan)	21	(1)
2004–2008	Ternana	24	(1)
2005	→ Piacenza (loan)	9	(1)
2005–2006	→ Salernitana (loan)	29	(6)
2006–2007	→ Bari (loan)	15	(1)
2008	Spezia	13	(1)
2008–2009	Pescara	15	(1)
2009–2010	Atletico Roma	11	(0)
2010–2012	Sambenedettese	46	(17)
2012–2013	Campobasso	20	(5)
2013–2014	Aversa Normanna	24	(4)
2015	Sillamäe Kalev		
2016	Ischia Isolaverde	15	(2)
2016–	Melfi	0	(0)
- * Club domestic league appearances and goals as of 17 February 2015

Giorgio Di Vicino (born 16 July 1980) is an Italian former professional footballer who played as a midfielder for Melfi.
