= Evgeni Kabaev =

Russian footballer

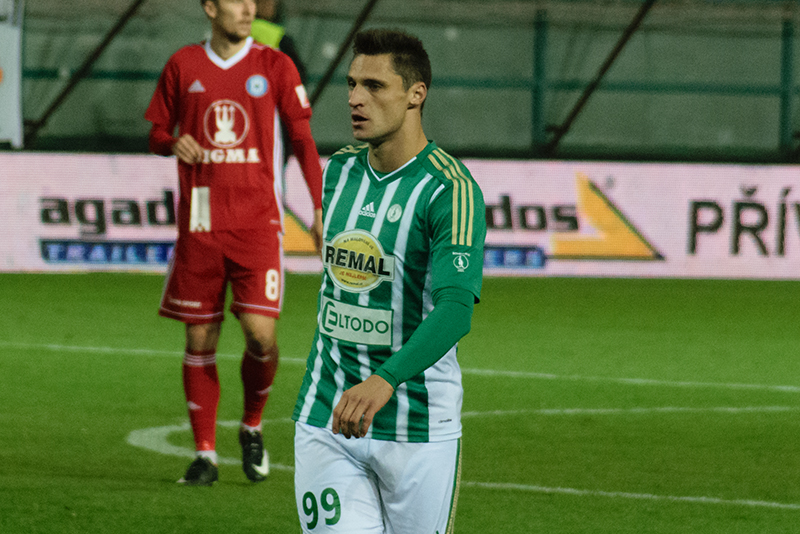

Personal information
- Full name: Evgeni Gennadyevich Kabaev
- Date of birth: 28 February 1988 (age 38)
- Place of birth: Leningrad, Russian SFSR
- Height: 1.83 m (6 ft 0 in)
- Position: Forward

Youth career
- FC Kolomyagi St. Petersburg

Senior career*
| Years | Team | Apps | (Gls) |
| 2007–2010 | Sillamäe Kalev | 52 | (38) |
| 2010 | Kohtla-Järve Lootus | 3 | (1) |
| 2010 | Oulun Palloseura | 3 | (0) |
| 2010–2011 | FC Petrotrest Saint Petersburg | 4 | (0) |
| 2011–2012 | FC Karelia Petrozavodsk | 6 | (0) |
| 2012–2014 | Sillamäe Kalev | 79 | (54) |
| 2014–2015 | Persija Jakarta | 4 | (0) |
| 2015–2016 | Sillamäe Kalev | 30 | (26) |
| 2017–2018 | Bohemians 1905 | 34 | (6) |
| 2018–2019 | FC SKA-Khabarovsk | 24 | (1) |
| 2019 | FCI Levadia | 2 | (1) |
| 2019 | Real de Minas | 5 | (2) |
| 2020 | Samut Sakhon | 10 | (3) |
| 2020–2021 | Sisaket | 17 | (8) |
| 2021–2022 | Chiangmai | 12 | (2) |
| 2023 | Samutsongkhram | 8 | (3) |
| Total | | 293 | (145) |
- * Club domestic league appearances and goals

Evgeni Gennadyevich Kabaev (Russian: Евгений Геннадьевич Кабаев; born 28 February 1988) is a Russian former professional footballer who played as a forward.

Kabaev has been the top scorer of Estonian Meistriliiga twice, in 2014 and 2016 season.

== Club career ==
He made his debut in the Russian Second Division for FC Petrotrest St. Petersburg on 18 April 2011 in a game against FC Karelia Petrozavodsk.

In 2014, he is Top Scorer of Estonia Top Level and The Best Player of Estonia top level, with 36 goals.

On 3 December 2014 Kabaev joined Indonesian club Persija Jakarta, but the league season in Indonesia got canceled.

On 8 January 2017, Kabaev signed a two-year contract with Czech club Bohemians 1905.

On 17 July 2019, Kabaev joined Estonian Club FCI Levadia. On July 29, Kabaev was arrested for driving 42 km/h over the speed limit. He spent two days in jail. As he had not paid two previous fines for speeding, Kabaev's visa was cancelled, the player was deported and he was banned from entering the Schengen area for one year.

After being released from contract with Levadia Kabaev signed with Honduran club C.D. Real de Minas.

== Honours ==
Individual

- Meistriliiga Top Score: 2014, 2016
- Meistriliiga Player of the Month: August 2014, October 2016
- Meistriliiga Player of the Year: 2016
