= Robert Kirss =

Estonian footballer (born 1994)

Personal information
- Full name: Robert Kirss
- Date of birth: 3 September 1994 (age 32)
- Place of birth: Pärnu, Estonia
- Height: 1.84 m (6 ft 0 in)
- Position: Forward

Team information
- Current team: Levadia
- Number: 17

Youth career
- 2004–2010: Pärnu/Vaprus

Senior career*
Years	Team	Apps	(Gls)
2010	Vaprus	27	(0)
2011–2012	Pärnu Linnameeskond	60	(14)
2013–2016	Nõmme Kalju U21	49	(30)
2013–2019	Nõmme Kalju	107	(25)
2015	→ Pärnu Linnameeskond (loan)	34	(6)
2020–2022	Levadia	78	(30)
2023	Sandecja Nowy Sącz	9	(0)
2023–	Levadia	83	(8)

International career^{‡}
2009	Estonia U16	6	(0)
2010	Estonia U17	5	(0)
2012	Estonia U19	5	(0)
2013–2016	Estonia U21	22	(4)
2016–2018	Estonia U23	2	(0)
2019–	Estonia	14	(1)
- * Club domestic league appearances and goals as of 17 November 2026 ‡ National team caps and goals as of 4 January 2023

Robert Kirss (born 3 September 1994) is an Estonian professional footballer who plays as a forward for Levadia.

== International career ==
Kirss made his senior international debut for Estonia on 11 January 2019, in a 2–1 friendly win over Finland. He scored his first international goal in a 2–0 UEFA Nations League win over San Marino.

== Career statistics ==
=== International ===
Scores and results list Estonia's goal tally first, score column indicates score after each Kirss goal.

List of international goals scored by Robert Kirss
No.	Date	Venue	Opponent	Score	Result	Competition
1	2 June 2022	A. Le Coq Arena, Tallinn, Estonia	San Marino	1–0	2–0	2022–23 UEFA Nations League D

== Honours ==
Nõmme Kalju

- Meistriliiga: 2018

Levadia

- Meistriliiga: 2021, 2024, 2026
- Estonian Cup: 2020–21, 2023–24
- Estonian Supercup: 2022

Individual

- Meistriliiga Goal of the Month: July 2017
- Meistriliiga Player of the Month: June/July 2021
