= Vitali Teleš =

Estonian footballer

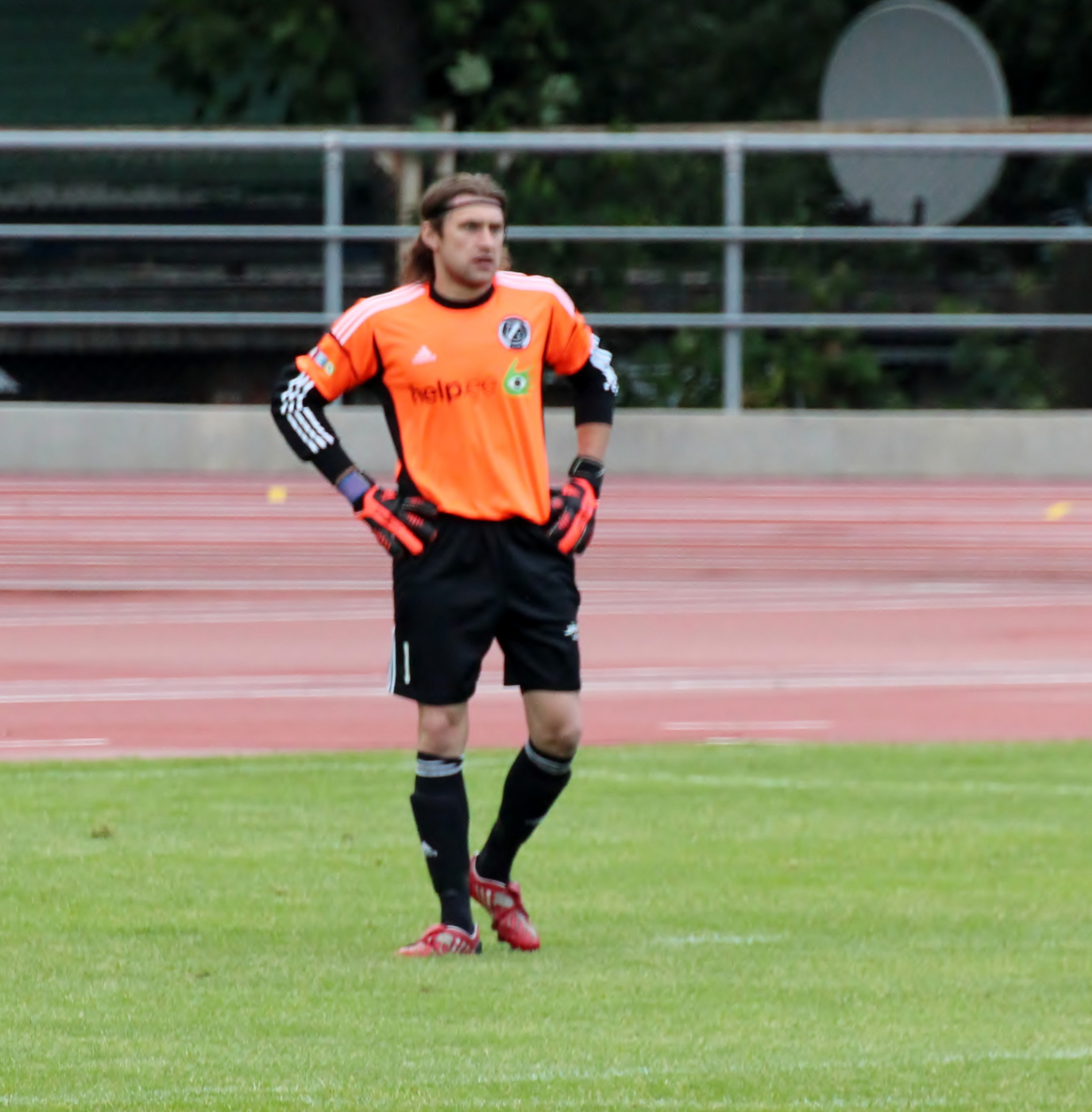
- Vitali Teleš in 2012.

Personal information
- Full name: Vitali Teleš
- Date of birth: 17 October 1983 (age 43)
- Place of birth: Tallinn, then part of Estonian SSR, Soviet Union
- Height: 1.83 m (6 ft 0 in)
- Position: Goalkeeper

Team information
- Current team: Maardu Linnameeskond
- Number: 1

Youth career
- TJK

Senior career*
Years	Team	Apps	(Gls)
1998–2004	TJK	1	(0)
2004–2008	TVMK Tallinn	144	(0)
2009–2011	FF Jaro	61	(0)
2012–2019	Nõmme Kalju	247	(1)
2020–	Maardu Linnameeskond	64	(0)
- * Club domestic league appearances and goals as of 19 November 2025

Vitali Teleš (born 17 October 1983 in Tallinn) is an Estonian footballer who plays for Estonian club Maardu Linnameeskond as a goalkeeper.

== Club career ==
=== TVMK Tallinn ===
After TVMK was disbanded Teleš was about to retire of professional football and return to TJK as an amateur, but then got a chance to play in Finnish Veikkausliiga for FF Jaro.

=== FF Jaro ===
He made his league debut for FF Jaro on 31 May 2009 in a 5–1 win against JJK.

=== JK Nõmme Kalju ===
On 23 January 2012, it was announced that Teleš had signed a one-year contract with JK Nõmme Kalju. He made the league debut for the club on 10 March 2012, in a goalless draw against city rivals FC Levadia Tallinn. In September 2012, he signed a new contract until the end of 2014 season. Teleš was one of three players to play every single minute of the 2012 league season, others being teammate Ken Kallaste and JK Sillamäe Kalev goalkeeper Mihhail Starodubtsev. He repeated the feat in the next season.
