= Sander Post =

Estonian footballer and coach

Personal information
- Full name: Sander Post
- Date of birth: 10 September 1984 (age 42)
- Place of birth: Viljandi, then part of Estonian SSR, Soviet Union
- Height: 1.99 m (6 ft 6 in)
- Positions: Striker; centre back

Senior career*
Years	Team	Apps	(Gls)
2001–2003	FC Elva	21	(0)
2003–2004	Tulevik	27	(6)
2004–2011	Flora	92	(49)
2005	→ Tervis (loan)	19	(8)
2005–2006	→ Vejle Boldklub (loan)	1	(0)
2008–2010	→ Go Ahead Eagles (loan)	41	(10)
2011–2013	Aalesund	40	(5)
2013–2015	Flora	56	(23)
2015–2018	Tulevik	91	(26)

International career
2004–2014	Estonia	12	(1)

Managerial career
- 2018–2020: Tulevik
- 2021: Tulevik (caretaker)
- 2025–: Kuressaare
- * Club domestic league appearances and goals

Sander Post (born 10 September 1984 in Viljandi) is an Estonian football coach and former player who played as a centre back. He is the current manager of Meistriliiga club FC Kuressaare.

== Club career ==
=== Early career ===
Post made his first-team debut for FC Elva at the age of 16 in 2001, as a defender. After two seasons in Elva, he moved to JK Viljandi Tulevik. At the age of 19, Sander started his professional career with FC Flora Tallinn, Estonia's biggest club, in 2004. In the same season he had short spell with JK Tervis Pärnu, where he made 19 appearances, scoring 8 goals.

=== Stint in Denmark ===
On 16 June 2005, Post signed for Danish 1st Division club Vejle Boldklub on a one-year loan deal, but failed to make impact there and only played in one league match.

=== Back to Flora ===
In summer 2006, Post returned to Flora. Until 2008 had he played mostly as a centre back, but was moved to play as a striker, because the team lacked attacking players due to injury crysis. The tall Estonian accommodated his new role well, scoring 19 goals in 20 games, before moving abroad again.

=== Go Ahead Eagles ===
On 21 August 2008, Post signed for Dutch side Go Ahead Eagles on a one-year loan deal for initial fee of €60,000 with a buy clause of €200,000. Only one day later he scored his first goal for Go Ahead Eagles in his debut match in Eerste Divisie and for Go Ahead Eagles, in the 72nd minute in a 1–1 draw against RKC Waalwijk. The loan deal was extended for another season in summer 2009.

=== Back to FC Flora ===
In 2010, Post arrived back to Flora in the middle of the season. He scored 24 goals with 17 games in 2010 Meistriliiga and became the world's most effective Top Division Goal Scorer with 1,412 goals per game.

He started his 2011 Meistriliiga season well with a goal against JK Nõmme Kalju.

=== Aalesunds FK ===
On 31 March 2011, Post signed a three-year contract with Norwegian club Aalesunds FK. AaFK was looking for a replacement for their striker Tor Hogne Aarøy (204 cm) who had left the club for a career in Japan. He made his debut for Aalesund on 1 April 2011, in a 2–0 loss versus Vålerenga Fotball, the day after he had signed. On 16 May 2011 he scored his first league goal for Aalesund, in a 2–1 win versus Strømsgodset IF. The contract was mutually terminated on 1 February 2013 due to lack of play time.

=== Flora again ===
Post rejoined FC Flora Tallinn on 11 February 2013, when he signed a contract until the end of the 2014 season with the club. He made his return in an Estonian Cup match against FC Reaal, in which he scored 8 goals in an 18–0 win for Flora.

== International career ==
He made his national team debut on 2 December 2004 against Hungary in a 2004 King's Cup. More than five years later, on 21 May 2010, he made the second appearance for the team in a friendly match against Finland, in which he scored his first international goal.

=== International goals ===
#	Date	Venue	Opponent	Result	Competition
1	2010-05-21	A. Le Coq Arena, Tallinn	Finland	2–0	Friendly

== Career stats ==
=== Club ===
Season	Club	Country	Level	Apps	Goals
2013	FC Flora Tallinn	Estonia	I
2012	Aalesunds FK	Norway	I	22	4
2011	Aalesunds FK	Norway	I	18	1
2011	FC Flora Tallinn	Estonia	I	4	1
2010	FC Flora Tallinn	Estonia	I	17	24
2009/10	Go Ahead Eagles	Netherlands	II	22	4
2008/09	Go Ahead Eagles	Netherlands	II	19	6
2008	FC Flora Tallinn	Estonia	I	20	19
2007	FC Flora Tallinn	Estonia	I	20	3
2006	FC Flora Tallinn	Estonia	I	7	0
2005/06	Vejle BK	Denmark	II	1	0
2005	FC Flora Tallinn	Estonia	I	13	2
2004	JK Tervis Pärnu	Estonia	III	19	8
2004	FC Flora Tallinn	Estonia	I	11	0
2003	JK Viljandi Tulevik	Estonia	I	27	6
2002	FC Elva	Estonia	III	0	0
2001	FC Elva	Estonia	III	21	0

== Honours ==
- Meistriliiga Footballer of the Season 2010
