= Pärnu Linnameeskond =

Estonian football club

- Full name: Pärnu Linnameeskond
- Founded: 2010
- Dissolved: 2017
- Ground: Pärnu Rannastaadion, Pärnu
- Capacity: 1501
- 2016: Meistriliiga, 9th
- Website: http://parnulm.ee

Pärnu Linnameeskond or simply Pärnu, was an Estonian football club based in Pärnu. Founded in 2010 as the union of Vaprus, Pärnu JK and Pärnu Kalev. Pärnu Linnameeskond finished 2014 Esiliiga season in third place and was promoted to Meistriliiga. Linnameeskond broke up after second season in the top tier with Vaprus inheriting their league spot for 2017.

== Honours ==
- Esiliiga
  - Third place (1): 2014
- Esiliiga B
  - Runners-up (1): 2013

=== Managerial history ===
Manager	Career
(Estonia) Kalev Pajula	2011–2012
(Estonia) Gert Olesk	2013–2014
(Estonia) Marko Lelov	2014–2016

== Statistics ==
=== League and Cup ===
Season	Level	Pos	Pld	W	D	L	GF	GA	GD	Pts	Top goalscorer	Cup
2011	II	8	36	8	11	17	55	63	−8	35	(Estonia) Taavi Laurits (11)	
2012	II	9	36	9	9	18	43	72	−29	36	(Estonia) Robert Kirss (9)	Quarterfinalist
2013	III	2	36	25	4	7	114	53	+61	79	(Estonia) Henri Hanson (28)	Quarterfinalist
2014	II	3	36	19	3	14	109	78	+31	60	(Estonia) Henri Hanson (25)	Fourth round
2015	I	8	36	6	8	22	38	87	−49	26	(Estonia) Taavi Laurits (11)	First round
2016	I	9	36	5	2	29	24	98	–74	17		Fourth round
