= List of Estonian football transfers winter 2012–13 =

This is a list of Estonian football transfers in the winter transfer window 2012–13 by club. Only transfers in Meistriliiga are included.

== Meistriliiga ==
=== Flora ===
In:

| No. | Pos. | Nation | Player |
|---|---|---|---|
| 3 | DF | EST | Märten Pajunurm (loan return from Kuressaare) |
| 8 | MF | NED | Sander van de Streek (on loan from (Netherlands) Vitesse Arnhem) |
| 14 | DF | EST | Martin Kase (from Tallinna Kalev) |
| 15 | DF | EST | Johannes Kukebal (loan return from Tallinna Kalev) |
| 18 | FW | RUS | Irakli Logua (from (Russia) Dynamo Moscow) |
| 20 | FW | EST | Maksim Gussev (from TJK Legion) |
| 21 | GK | EST | Marko Meerits (on loan from (Netherlands) Vitesse Arnhem) |
| 31 | FW | EST | Sander Post (from (Norway) Aalesund) |
| 34 | DF | EST | Marten Mütt (from Viljandi) |
| 35 | FW | CIV | Adou Seka (from (Ivory Coast) Jeunesse) |

Out:

| No. | Pos. | Nation | Player |
|---|---|---|---|
| 1 | GK | EST | Stanislav Pedõk (on loan to Narva Trans) |
| 4 | DF | EST | Aleksei Jahhimovitš (to Levadia) |
| 7 | MF | GEO | Zakaria Beglarishvili (to (Georgia (country)) Sioni Bolnisi) |
| 10 | FW | EST | Martti Pukk (to Kuressaare) |
| 11 | MF | EST | Siim Luts (to (Sweden) Norrköping) |
| 17 | FW | EST | Kaarel Torop (to Tammeka) |
| 18 | MF | RUS | Nikolai Mashichev (to Sillamäe Kalev) |
| 19 | DF | EST | Gert Kams (to (Finland) SJK) |
| — | GK | EST | Siim-Sten Palm (on loan to Kuressaare) |
| — | DF | EST | Joel Indermitte (on loan to Kuressaare) |
| — | DF | EST | Raio Piiroja (to (China) Chengdu Blades) |

=== Narva Trans ===
In:

| No. | Pos. | Nation | Player |
|---|---|---|---|
| 1 | GK | EST | Valeri Smelkov (free agent) |
| 3 | DF | EST | Roman Nesterovski (from Sillamäe Kalev) |
| 4 | DF | RUS | Stanislav Engovatov (from (Russia) Piter St. Petersburg) |
| 10 | MF | EST | Denis Vnukov (from Tallinna Kalev) |
| 11 | MF | RUS | Ilya Shesterkov (from (Finland) KooTeePee) |
| 14 | DF | EST | Ivan Lihhatšov (from Kiviõli Irbis) |
| 16 | MF | EST | Albert Taar (from Levadia) |
| 18 | DF | EST | Deniss Kulikov (from Järve) |
| 20 | DF | RUS | Maksim Krychanov (from (Russia) Karelia Petrozavodsk) |
| 22 | FW | LVA | Andrejs Perepļotkins (from (Uzbekistan) Nasaf Qarshi) |
| 27 | GK | RUS | Yevgeni Ponyatovski |
| 33 | GK | EST | Stanislav Pedõk (on loan from Flora) |

Out:

| No. | Pos. | Nation | Player |
|---|---|---|---|
| 1 | GK | RUS | Sergei Prikhodko |
| 2 | DF | LVA | Jevgēņijs Kazura (to (Latvia) Gulbene) |
| 3 | DF | EST | Aleksandr Kulik (released) |
| 4 | DF | EST | Igor Ovsjannikov |
| 7 | FW | EST | Vitali Gussev (released) |
| 8 | MF | LVA | Dmitrijs Medeckis (to (Latvia) Jelgava) |
| 9 | FW | EST | Maksim Gruznov (retired) |
| 10 | MF | LVA | Aleksandrs Abramenko (to (Latvia) Ilūkstes NSS) |
| 11 | MF | EST | Sergei Leontovitš (released) |
| 12 | MF | RUS | Maksim Bukatkin (to (Russia) Znamya Truda Orekhovo-Zuevo) |
| 13 | MF | EST | Vladislav Fjodorov |
| 14 | DF | EST | Erik Grigorjev (released) |
| 17 | FW | RUS | Aleksandr Alekseev |
| 18 | MF | LVA | Nikolajs Zaicevs (loan return to (Latvia) Skonto) |
| 20 | FW | RUS | Vladislav Ivanov (to (Russia) Luch-Energiya Vladivostok) |
| 22 | DF | LVA | Aleksejs Kuplovs-Oginskis (to (Latvia) Ilūkstes NSS) |
| 27 | GK | RUS | Yevgeni Ponyatovski (on loan to Jõhvi Lokomotiv) |

=== Levadia ===
In:

| No. | Pos. | Nation | Player |
|---|---|---|---|
| 4 | DF | EST | Kaspar Kaldoja (from Tammeka) |
| 5 | MF | EST | Erkki Junolainen (from Viljandi) |
| 7 | FW | RUS | Nikita Kolyaev (from (Israel) Ironi Bat Yam) |
| 15 | MF | EST | Aleksandr Dmitrijev (from (Belarus) Gomel) |
| 21 | DF | EST | Aleksei Jahhimovitš (from Flora) |

Out:

| No. | Pos. | Nation | Player |
|---|---|---|---|
| 4 | DF | EST | Igor Morozov (to (Poland) Polonia Warsaw) |
| 7 | MF | EST | Janar Toomet (to Nõmme Kalju) |
| 18 | MF | EST | Albert Taar (to Narva Trans) |
| 24 | DF | EST | Markus Holst (on loan to Paide Linnameeskond) |
| 25 | FW | EST | Trevor Elhi (on loan to Infonet) |

=== Tammeka ===
In:

| No. | Pos. | Nation | Player |
|---|---|---|---|
| 1 | GK | EST | Kaido Koppel (from Nõmme Kalju) |
| 4 | DF | GER | Marvin Prempeh (from (Germany) SC Poppenbüttel) |
| 6 | MF | EST | Tauno Tekko (from Pärnu Linnameeskond) |
| 10 | MF | EST | Kaarel Torop (from Flora) |
| 11 | MF | CGO | Yannick Mbemba (from (Republic of the Congo) Léopards) |
| 14 | FW | EST | Georgi Ivanov (from Tartu SK 10) |
| 17 | MF | CRO | Silvio Philips (from (Croatia) Otok) |
| 27 | FW | POR | Hugo Fernandes (free agent) |
| 97 | FW | EST | Marek Naal (from Valga Warrior) |

Out:

| No. | Pos. | Nation | Player |
|---|---|---|---|
| 5 | DF | EST | Kaspar Kaldoja (to Levadia) |
| 10 | MF | USA | Alex Nimo |
| 11 | MF | EST | Maido Pakk |
| 14 | DF | EST | Martin Haljak |
| 17 | MF | EST | Mikk Laas (to Tartu Santos) |
| 27 | FW | EST | Olari Perlin |
| 99 | FW | GUI | Ousmane Barry (on loan to (Greece) Kavala) |

=== Nõmme Kalju ===
In:

| No. | Pos. | Nation | Player |
|---|---|---|---|
| 10 | FW | JPN | Kōsuke Usami (from (Japan) Yokohama F. Marinos) |
| 11 | MF | FRA | Allan Kimbaloula (free agent) |
| 13 | DF | EST | Hindrek Ojamaa (from Levadia II) |
| 17 | FW | EST | Robert Kirss (from Pärnu Linnameeskond) |
| 19 | MF | EST | Janar Toomet (from Levadia) |
| 20 | FW | EST | Alo Dupikov (from (Norway) Egersund) |
| 23 | FW | EST | Vladimir Voskoboinikov (from (Georgia (country)) Dinamo Tbilisi) |
| 69 | GK | EST | Richard Aland (from Tartu SK 10) |
| 88 | MF | BIH | Adis Hadžanović (from (Bosnia and Herzegovina) Famos-SAŠK Napredak) |

Out:

| No. | Pos. | Nation | Player |
|---|---|---|---|
| 10 | FW | EST | Oliver Konsa (released) |
| 11 | FW | EST | Kristen Viikmäe (retired) |
| 25 | MF | GAM | George Cole |
| 96 | GK | EST | Kaido Koppel (to Tammeka) |

=== Sillamäe Kalev ===
In:

| No. | Pos. | Nation | Player |
|---|---|---|---|
| 2 | DF | LTU | Marius Činikas (free agent) |
| 5 | DF | LTU | Mindaugas Bagužis (from (Latvia) Liepājas Metalurgs) |
| 7 | MF | EST | Deniss Tjapkin (from Järve) |
| 8 | MF | EST | Martin Vunk (from (Greece) Panachaiki) |
| 11 | MF | RUS | Nikolai Mashichev (from Flora) |
| 18 | MF | LTU | Linas Savastas (from (Lithuania) Kruoja Pakruojis) |
| 22 | DF | EST | Kennet Jädal (from Puuma) |

Out:

| No. | Pos. | Nation | Player |
|---|---|---|---|
| 5 | DF | LTU | Eimantas Valaitis (to (Austria) St. Georgen/Ybbsfelde) |
| 18 | MF | EST | Roman Nesterovski (to Narva Trans) |
| 20 | DF | LTU | Kazimieras Gnedojus (to (Lithuania) Atlantas) |
| 21 | MF | FIN | Sergei Korsunov (to (Finland) TPV) |
| 22 | MF | LTU | Edgaras Mastianica (to (Lithuania) Klaipėdos Granitas) |
| 23 | MF | EST | Ats Sillaste (to Tallinna Kalev) |
| 25 | DF | LVA | Romāns Gladiļins (to (Latvia) Jūrmala) |
| 26 | DF | EST | Tanel Tamberg |
| 71 | MF | GEO | Davit Lortkipanidze |

=== Kuressaare ===
In:

| No. | Pos. | Nation | Player |
|---|---|---|---|
| 1 | GK | EST | Siim-Sten Palm (on loan from Flora) |
| 2 | MF | EST | Juri Gavrilov (on loan from Flora II) |
| 8 | MF | EST | Sander Sinilaid (from Viljandi) |
| 9 | FW | EST | Martti Pukk (from Flora) |
| 14 | DF | EST | Edgars Butlers (from TJK Legion) |
| 17 | FW | EST | Raiko Karpov (on loan from Flora II) |
| 19 | MF | EST | Ott Reinike (from Raasiku Joker) |
| 21 | DF | EST | Joel Indermitte (on loan from Flora) |
| 26 | MF | EST | Sander Laht (from Viljandi) |
| 29 | DF | EST | Andro Aavik (from Lihula) |
| 33 | MF | EST | Bert Klemmer (from Viljandi) |

Out:

| No. | Pos. | Nation | Player |
|---|---|---|---|
| 1 | GK | EST | Mihhail Lavrentjev (to Paide Linnameeskond) |
| 11 | MF | EST | Mikk Metsa (to Viljandi Tulevik) |
| 21 | DF | EST | Tauno Laja |
| 26 | DF | EST | Sami-Sander Kivi |
| 33 | DF | EST | Märten Pajunurm (loan return to Flora) |

=== Paide Linnameeskond ===
In:

| No. | Pos. | Nation | Player |
|---|---|---|---|
| 1 | GK | EST | Mihhail Lavrentjev (from Kuressaare) |
| 11 | FW | EST | Aleksandr Vassiljev (from M.C. Tallinn) |
| 23 | FW | EST | Karl Ivar Maar (on loan from Flora II) |
| 24 | MF | EST | Markus Holst (on loan from Levadia) |
| 28 | FW | EST | Jaan Leimann (from Viljandi) |

Out:

| No. | Pos. | Nation | Player |
|---|---|---|---|
| 11 | FW | EST | Mihail Ištšuk |
| 12 | GK | EST | Aiko Orgla (to Viljandi Tulevik) |
| 16 | FW | EST | Stanislav Goldberg (to (Finland) SJK) |
| 19 | MF | EST | Richard Leht (loan return to Levadia II) |
| 28 | MF | FIN | Oskari Lehtonen (to Infonet) |

=== Tallinna Kalev ===
In:

| No. | Pos. | Nation | Player |
|---|---|---|---|
| 1 | GK | IRL | Gary Hogan (from (Norway) HamKam) |
| 6 | DF | GER | Yaşar Koca (from (Germany) Bergedorf 85) |
| 7 | DF | EQG | Daniel Evuy (from (Spain) Villaviciosa Odón) |
| 8 | MF | EST | Maksim Paponov (free agent) |
| 11 | FW | GER | Fatih Altundağ (from (Turkey) Darıca Gençlerbirliği) |
| 12 | MF | EST | Martin Tšegodajev (on loan from Nõmme Kalju) |
| 13 | MF | TUR | Serhat Yapıcı (from (Turkey) Manavgat Evrensekispor) |
| 15 | DF | EST | Mikk Sillaste (from (Norway) Egersund) |
| 17 | DF | EST | Sander Karu (from Viljandi) |
| 19 | FW | BIH | Aladin Šišić (free agent) |
| 20 | FW | EST | Ian-Erik Valge (from Puuma) |
| 23 | MF | EST | Ats Sillaste (from Sillamäe Kalev) |
| 26 | DF | EST | Elvis Liivamägi (from Viljandi) |

Out:

| No. | Pos. | Nation | Player |
|---|---|---|---|
| 6 | DF | EST | Martin Kase (to Flora) |
| 10 | MF | JPN | Hiroyuki Mitsuyama |
| 11 | FW | EST | Rejal Alijev (to Tallinna Dünamo) |
| 12 | MF | USA | Garrett Gunther |
| 13 | MF | EST | Denis Vnukov (to Narva Trans) |
| 15 | DF | EST | Johannes Kukebal (loan return to Flora) |
| 19 | DF | FIN | Ionel Armean |
| 21 | MF | EST | Deniss Kabanov (released) |
| 23 | DF | EST | Aleksandr Kulikov (to Sillamäe Kalev II) |
| 24 | MF | EST | Daniil Ratnikov (to Jõhvi Lokomotiv II) |
| 27 | MF | EST | Eduard Ratnikov |
| 89 | GK | FRA | Eric Tshibangu (to Keila) |

=== Infonet ===
In:

| No. | Pos. | Nation | Player |
|---|---|---|---|
| 12 | DF | FIN | Oskari Lehtonen (from Paide Linnameeskond) |
| 14 | MF | EST | Nikita Martõnov (from Levadia II) |
| 17 | MF | RUS | Vladislav Smirnov (from (Russia) Krylya Sovetov Moscow) |
| 19 | MF | BLR | Vladimir Kharlanov (from (Belarus) Gomel) |
| 22 | FW | EST | Trevor Elhi (on loan from Levadia) |
| 23 | DF | UKR | Anton Chuikov (on loan from Levadia II) |
| 38 | MF | EST | Konstantin Nahk (free agent) |
| — | DF | EST | Andrei Stepanov (free agent) |

Out:

| No. | Pos. | Nation | Player |
|---|---|---|---|
| 12 | MF | EST | Sergei Tasso (to Lasnamäe Ajax) |
| 19 | MF | EST | Vladimir Vassiljev (to Levadia II) |

== See also ==
- 2013 Esiliiga
- 2013 Meistriliiga
