= List of Estonian football transfers winter 2015–16 =

This is a list of Estonian football transfers in the winter transfer window 2015–16 by club. Only transfers in Meistriliiga are included.

== Meistriliiga ==
=== Flora ===
In:

No.	Pos.	Nation	Player
26	MF	(Estonia) EST	Sander Laht (from Kuressaare)
29	FW	(Finland) FIN	Sakari Tukiainen (loan return from Tulevik)
—	MF	(Estonia) EST	Kaspar Paur (from Paide Linnameeskond)
—	FW	(Estonia) EST	Hannes Anier (free agent)

Out:

No.	Pos.	Nation	Player
13	DF	(Estonia) EST	Joosep Juha (to Paide Linnameeskond, previously on loan to Paide Linnameeskond)
14	FW	(Estonia) EST	Martin Kase (to Paide Linnameeskondpreviously on loan to Paide Linnameeskond)
38	MF	(Estonia) EST	Karl-Eerik Luigend (retired, previously on loan to Paide Linnameeskond)
—	DF	(Estonia) EST	Johannes Kukebal (to Paide Linnameeskond)
—	MF	(Estonia) EST	Roman Sobtšenko (on loan to Infonet)

=== Levadia ===
In:

No.	Pos.	Nation	Player
14	GK	(Estonia) EST	Kristjan Tamme (loan return from Pärnu Linnameeskond)
—	DF	(Estonia) EST	Maksim Podholjuzin (free agent)
—	DF	(Estonia) EST	Igor Morozov (free agent)
—	DF	(Cameroon) CMR	Luc Manga (from APEJES)
—	MF	(Cameroon) CMR	Marcelin Gando (from APEJES)
—	MF	(Russia) RUS	Yevgeni Kobzar (from Zenit-Izhevsk)
—	MF	(Russia) RUS	Anton Miranchuk (on loan from Lokomotiv Moscow)
—	MF	(Estonia) EST	Daniil Ratnikov (from Sillamäe Kalev)
—	FW	(Estonia) EST	Rimo Hunt (from Kaysar Kyzylorda)

Out:

No.	Pos.	Nation	Player
3	DF	(Belarus) BLR	Artsyom Rakhmanaw
4	DF	(Finland) FIN	Juuso Laitinen
5	MF	(Egypt) EGY	Omar Elhussieny (to Persela Lamongan)
7	MF	(Estonia) EST	Tarmo Kink (to SJK)
9	FW	(Estonia) EST	Artur Rättel (to Infonet)
10	FW	(Estonia) EST	Igor Subbotin (to Miedź Legnica)
11	FW	(Estonia) EST	Ingemar Teever
18	MF	(Estonia) EST	Dmitri Kruglov (to Infonet)
22	DF	(Estonia) EST	Artur Pikk (to BATE Borisov)
23	DF	(Estonia) EST	Artjom Artjunin (to Miedź Legnica)
25	FW	(Estonia) EST	Kaimar Saag (to Nybergsund-Trysil)
28	FW	(Estonia) EST	Kristen Saarts (loan return from Pärnu Linnameeskond, previously on loan to Pärnu Linnameeskond)
29	DF	(Estonia) EST	Taavi Rähn (to Paide Linnameeskond)
35	GK	(Estonia) EST	Sergei Pareiko (retired)

=== Nõmme Kalju ===
In:

No.	Pos.	Nation	Player
17	FW	(Estonia) EST	Robert Kirss (loan return from Pärnu Linnameeskond)
—	DF	(Belgium) BEL	Alex (from Royal Cappellen)
—	DF	(Estonia) EST	Trevor Elhi (from Infonet)
—	DF	(Estonia) EST	Andrei Sidorenkov (from Sillamäe Kalev)
—	DF	(Italy) ITA	Maximiliano Uggè (from Sūduva Marijampolė)
—	MF	(Estonia) EST	Vlasiy Sinyavskiy (from Narva Trans)
—	FW	(Italy) ITA	Damiano Quintieri (free agent)

Out:

No.	Pos.	Nation	Player
2	DF	(Estonia) EST	Martin Mägi (on loan to Pärnu Linnameeskond)
5	DF	(Estonia) EST	Alo Bärengrub (retired)
10	MF	(Republic of the Congo) CGO	Allan Kimbaloula
11	FW	(Estonia) EST	Vladimir Voskoboinikov (to Infonet)
12	MF	(Estonia) EST	Stanislav Goldberg
14	DF	(Estonia) EST	Ken Kallaste (to Górnik Zabrze)
19	MF	(Estonia) EST	Erkki Junolainen
20	MF	(Estonia) EST	Joel Lindpere
23	DF	(Bosnia and Herzegovina) BIH	Borislav Topić (to Jedinstvo Bihać)

=== Infonet ===
In:

No.	Pos.	Nation	Player
5	DF	(Ghana) GHA	Ofosu Appiah (from Skonto Riga)
6	MF	(Ghana) GHA	Haminu Draman (from Charlotte Independence)
14	MF	(Estonia) EST	Denis Vnukov (from Sillamäe Kalev)
17	MF	(Estonia) EST	Sergei Mošnikov (from Kaysar Kyzylorda)
23	MF	(Estonia) EST	Dmitri Kruglov (from Levadia)
24	FW	(Estonia) EST	Vladimir Voskoboinikov (from Nõmme Kalju)
—	MF	(Estonia) EST	Roman Sobtšenko (on loan from Flora)
—	FW	(Estonia) EST	Artur Rättel (from Levadia, previously on loan to Paide Linnameeskond)

Out:

No.	Pos.	Nation	Player
5	DF	(Russia) RUS	Aleksandr Semakhin (to Sillamäe Kalev)
6	DF	(Estonia) EST	Deniss Malov (retired)
8	MF	(Estonia) EST	Tanel Melts
10	MF	(Estonia) EST	Jevgeni Gurtšioglujants (to Maardu Linnameeskond)
11	FW	(Russia) RUS	Vladislav Ivanov
14	FW	(Sweden) SWE	Ermal Hajdari
19	MF	(France) FRA	Kassim Aidara (to Sillamäe Kalev)
22	DF	(Estonia) EST	Trevor Elhi (to Nõmme Kalju)
24	FW	(Latvia) LVA	Vladislavs Kozlovs

=== Sillamäe Kalev ===
In:

No.	Pos.	Nation	Player
—	DF	(Russia) RUS	Aleksandr Semakhin (from Infonet)
—	MF	(Estonia) EST	Maksim Paponov (free agent)
—	MF	(France) FRA	Kassim Aidara (from Infonet)
—	MF	(Estonia) EST	Maksim Lipin (from Levadia, previously on loan to Narva Trans)

Out:

No.	Pos.	Nation	Player
3	DF	(Lithuania) LTU	Marius Činikas (to Sūduva Marijampolė)
5	DF	(Russia) RUS	Igor Cheminava
7	FW	(Ukraine) UKR	Yaroslav Kvasov (loan return to Zorya Luhansk)
8	MF	(Estonia) EST	Denis Vnukov (to Infonet)
9	MF	(Ukraine) UKR	Kyrylo Silich (to Jelgava)
10	MF	(Estonia) EST	Daniil Ratnikov (to Levadia)
11	MF	(Estonia) EST	Janar Toomet
26	DF	(Lithuania) LTU	Mindaugas Bagužis
33	DF	(Estonia) EST	Andrei Sidorenkov (to Nõmme Kalju)
70	MF	(Lithuania) LTU	Rytis Leliūga
77	DF	(Estonia) EST	Tihhon Šišov
83	MF	(Italy) ITA	Giorgio Russo (loan return to Stumbras Kaunas)

=== Narva Trans ===
In:

No.	Pos.	Nation	Player
—	DF	(Russia) RUS	Dmitri Chernukhin (free agent)
—	MF	(Russia) RUS	Timur Dzhuraev (free agent)
—	MF	(Russia) RUS	Dmitri Proshin (from Pskov-747 Pskov)
—	FW	(Azerbaijan) AZE	Rizvan Umarov (from SKA-Energiya Khabarovsk)

Out:

No.	Pos.	Nation	Player
1	GK	(Ukraine) UKR	Roman Smishko
9	FW	(Ukraine) UKR	Volodymyr Kilikevych
13	MF	(Estonia) EST	Maksim Lipin (loan return to Levadia)
14	MF	(Estonia) EST	Vlasiy Sinyavskiy (to Nõmme Kalju)

=== Paide Linnameeskond ===
In:

No.	Pos.	Nation	Player
—	GK	(Estonia) EST	Kert Kütt (from Valdres)
—	DF	(Estonia) EST	Joosep Juha (from Flora, previously on loan to Paide Linnameeskond)
—	DF	(Estonia) EST	Johannes Kukebal (from Flora)
—	DF	(Estonia) EST	Taavi Rähn (from Levadia)
—	MF	(Estonia) EST	Karl Ivar Maar (from Flora U21)
—	FW	(Estonia) EST	Martin Kase (from Flora, previously on loan to Paide Linnameeskond)
—	FW	(Estonia) EST	Ander Ott Valge (from Nõmme United)

Out:

No.	Pos.	Nation	Player
1	GK	(Estonia) EST	Mihhail Kolesnikov
2	DF	(Estonia) EST	Andrei Veis
3	DF	(Russia) RUS	Viktor Klimeev
8	MF	(Estonia) EST	Kaspar Paur (to Flora U21)
10	MF	(Estonia) EST	Kennet Kukk
17	FW	(Estonia) EST	Artur Rättel (loan return to Levadia)
19	MF	(Estonia) EST	Karl-Eerik Luigend (loan return to Flora)
23	DF	(Estonia) EST	Kaspar Kaldoja
33	DF	(Estonia) EST	Märten Pajunurm
34	DF	(Estonia) EST	Joosep Juha (loan return to Flora)
—	DF	(Estonia) EST	Joel Indermitte (retired)
—	DF	(Estonia) EST	Urmas Rooba (retired)
—	FW	(Estonia) EST	Roman Sirotkin

=== Pärnu Linnameeskond ===
In:

No.	Pos.	Nation	Player
9	FW	(Estonia) EST	Kristen Saarts (from Levadia, previously on loan to Pärnu Linnameeskond)
—	DF	(Estonia) EST	Marco Lukka (from Kerho 07)
—	DF	(Estonia) EST	Martin Mägi (on loan from Nõmme Kalju)

Out:

No.	Pos.	Nation	Player
21	GK	(Estonia) EST	Kristjan Tamme (loan return to Levadia)
22	FW	(Estonia) EST	Robert Kirss (loan return to Nõmme Kalju)
—	DF	(Estonia) EST	Raio Piiroja (retired)

=== Tammeka ===
In:

No.	Pos.	Nation	Player

Out:

No.	Pos.	Nation	Player
9	FW	(Estonia) EST	Kristjan Moks
15	DF	(Estonia) EST	Siim Tenno (to Gifhorn)
16	DF	(Estonia) EST	Martin Naggel
21	FW	(Estonia) EST	Martin Hurt

=== Tarvas ===
In:

No.	Pos.	Nation	Player
—	DF	(Estonia) EST	Aleksei Larin (from Tallinna Kalev)
—	MF	(Estonia) EST	Erkki Kubber (on loan from Flora U21)
—	FW	(Estonia) EST	Juhan Jograf Siim (on loan from Flora U21)

Out:

No.	Pos.	Nation	Player
1	GK	(Estonia) EST	Jüris Sahkur (retired)
6	DF	(Estonia) EST	Mehis Vahero
9	FW	(Estonia) EST	Sergei Akimov (retired)
10	DF	(Estonia) EST	Margus Cristopher Kalda
—	DF	(Estonia) EST	Egert Peljo

== See also ==
- 2016 Meistriliiga
