= 2012 Meistriliiga =

Estonian national championships in football

Meistriliiga
- Season: 2012
- Champions: Nõmme Kalju
- Champions League: Nõmme Kalju
- Europa League: Levadia; Flora; Narva Trans
- Matches: 180
- Goals: 536 (2.98 per match)
- Top goalscorer: Vladislav Ivanov (23 goals)
- Biggest home win: Levadia 7–0 Kuressaare (30 July); Nõmme Kalju 7–0 Tallinna Kalev (4 September)
- Biggest away win: Kuressaare 0–9 Nõmme Kalju (28 August)
- Highest scoring: Viljandi 1–9 Nõmme Kalju (2 October)

The 2012 season of the Meistriliiga the first level in the Estonian football system is the 22nd season in the league's history. The competition started on 10 March 2012 and will end on 3 November 2012. The defending champions are Flora, who won their ninth league championship last year.

== Teams ==
Ajax finished the 2011 season in 10th place and were directly relegated to the Esiliiga, ending a one-year stay in the Estonian top flight. They were replaced by Tallinna Kalev, who return to the league after a two-year absence.

In addition, the 9th-placed Meistriliiga club, Kuressaare, faced the runners-up of the Esiliiga, Infonet, in a two-legged play-off for a spot in this season's competition. Kuressaare won the play-off, 5–1 on aggregate, retaining their spot in the league.

=== Stadiums and locations ===
Locations of the 2012 Meistriliiga teams

Club	Location	Stadium	Capacity
Flora	Tallinn	A. Le Coq Arena	9,692
Nõmme Kalju	Tallinn	Kadriorg Stadium	5,000
Kuressaare	Kuressaare	Kuressaare linnastaadion	2,000
Levadia	Tallinn	Maarjamäe Stadium	1,000
Paide Linnameeskond	Paide	Paide linnastaadion	368
Sillamäe Kalev	Sillamäe	Sillamäe Kalev Stadium	2,000
Tallinna Kalev	Tallinn	Kalev Keskstaadion	12,000
Tammeka	Tartu	Tartu Tamme Stadium	1,600
Narva Trans	Narva	Narva Kreenholm Stadium	3,000
Viljandi	Viljandi	Viljandi linnastaadion	1,006

=== Personnel and kits ===
Note: Flags indicate national team as has been defined under FIFA eligibility rules. Players and Managers may hold more than one non-FIFA nationality.

Team	Manager	Captain	Kit manufacturer	Shirt sponsor
Flora	(Estonia) Marko Lelov	(Estonia) Andre Frolov	Nike	KH Energia Konsult
Nõmme Kalju	(Estonia) Igor Prins	(Estonia) Alo Bärengrub	Adidas	Maxima
Kuressaare	(Estonia) Sergei Zamogilnõi	(Estonia) Sander Viira	Joma	—
Levadia	(Estonia) Marko Kristal	(Estonia) Igor Morozov	Adidas	Viimsi Keevitus
Paide Linnameeskond	(Estonia) Meelis Rooba	(Estonia) Carl Tubarik	Nike	Verston
Sillamäe Kalev	(Lithuania) Algimantas Briaunys	(Estonia) Mihhail Starodubtsev	Uhlsport	Alexela
Tallinna Kalev	(Estonia) Sergei Ratnikov	(Estonia) Aleksei Savitski	Jako	—
Tammeka	(Greece) Joti Stamatopoulos	(Estonia) Kaspar Kaldoja	Nike	Mäe-kodu
Narva Trans	(Russia) Aleksei Yagudin	(Estonia) Stanislav Kitto	Nike	Sportland
Viljandi	(Estonia) Zaur Tšilingarašvili	(Estonia) Ott Ottis	Joma	Express Hotline

=== Managerial changes ===
Team	Outgoing manager	Manner of departure	Date of vacancy	Position in table	Replaced by	Date of appointment
Levadia	(Estonia) Sergei Hohlov-Simson	End of contract	30 November 2011	Pre-season	(Estonia) Marko Kristal	1 December 2011
Narva Trans	(Russia) Aleksei Yagudin	End of contract	9 January 2012	Pre-season	(Russia) Sergei Prikhodko	10 January 2012
Narva Trans	(Russia) Sergei Prikhodko	Sacked	June	?	(Russia) Aleksei Yagudin	June
Tammeka	(Estonia) Kristjan Tiirik	Sacked	18 July 2012	10th	(Greece) Joti Stamatopoulos	19 July 2012
Sillamäe Kalev	(Estonia) Valeri Bondarenko	Sacked	7 September 2012	4th	(Lithuania) Algimantas Briaunys	8 September 2012
Flora	(Estonia) Martin Reim	Mutual agreement	14 October 2012	2nd	(Estonia) Marko Lelov	15 October 2012

== League table ==
Pos	Team	Pld	W	D	L	GF	GA	GD	Pts	Qualification or relegation
1	Nõmme Kalju (C)	36	29	5	2	106	17	+89	92	Qualification for Champions League second qualifying round
2	Levadia	36	25	8	3	85	22	+63	83	Qualification for Europa League first qualifying round (Note: Narva Trans qualified for the UEFA Europa League since 3rd-placed Flora qualified for the 2013–14 UEFA Europa League as Cup winner and Cup finalist Kalju had qualified for the 2013–14 UEFA Champions League.)
3	Flora	36	26	3	7	87	24	+63	81	Qualification for Europa League first qualifying round
4	Narva Trans	36	16	7	13	52	44	+8	55	Qualification for Europa League first qualifying round
5	Sillamäe Kalev	36	15	10	11	51	43	+8	55	
6	Paide	36	11	9	16	34	52	−18	42	
7	Viljandi	36	6	8	22	33	88	−55	26	Dissolved at the end of the season
8	Kuressaare	36	5	11	20	31	80	−49	26	
9	Tallinna Kalev (O)	36	4	9	23	27	87	−60	21	Qualification for relegation play-offs
10	Tammeka	36	4	8	24	30	79	−49	20	Relegation to Esiliiga (Note: Tammeka escaped relegation due to dissolving of seventh placed Viljandi at the end of season)

Source: Estonian Football Association (in Estonian)
Rules for classification: 1st points; 2nd least withdrawals or annulled matches; 3rd overall wins; 4th head-to-head points; 5th head-to-head goal difference; 6th goal difference; 7th goals scored.
If two or more teams on the top have the same number of points by the end of the season, the aforementioned rules will not apply and additional game(s) will be played to determine the champions
(C) Champions; (O) Play-off winners

=== Relegation play-off ===
At season's end, the ninth place club in the Meistriliiga will participate in a two-legged playoff with the runners-up of the 2012 Esiliiga for one spot in next year's competition.

11 November 2012
13:00 EET (GMT+2)

Tarvas	1–2	Tallinna Kalev
Hang 23'	Report	Tomson 70'; Kase 74'

Rakvere artificial turf, Rakvere
Attendance: 324
Referee: Jaan Roos
17 November 2012
13:00 EET (GMT+2)

Tallinna Kalev	1–0	Tarvas
Ratnikov 38'	Report

Kalev Keskstaadion, Tallinn
Attendance: 377
Referee: Hannes Kaasik

Tallinna Kalev retains their place in the league, winning 3–1 on aggregate.

== Results ==
Each team plays every opponent four times, twice at home and twice on the road, for a total of 36 games.

=== First half of season ===
Home \ Away	FLO	NÕM	KUR	LEV	PAI	SIL	T.K	TAM	NAR	VIL
Flora		1–0	0–1	0–1	1–0	3–0	5–0	4–0	2–1	5–0
Nõmme Kalju	2–0		2–0	0–0	1–0	5–0	3–1	3–0	4–1	4–0
Kuressaare	1–3	0–1		0–2	0–1	2–2	3–3	1–1	0–0	0–0
Levadia	1–1	1–1	5–0		1–0	1–1	0–0	1–0	4–0	2–0
Paide	0–5	1–3	2–1	1–5		1–1	1–0	2–0	0–0	0–1
Sillamäe Kalev	0–2	0–2	0–0	0–0	1–1		4–1	2–0	2–0	2–0
Tallinna Kalev	0–3	0–5	2–1	1–2	1–0	1–2		1–0	0–0	2–1
Tammeka	0–2	0–4	0–0	0–1	1–2	0–0	2–1		2–3	1–1
Narva Trans	1–2	1–2	1–3	1–2	2–0	1–0	5–1	2–0		3–1
Viljandi	0–2	0–3	3–1	0–3	0–2	0–3	1–1	3–2	0–1	

Source: Estonian Football Association
Legend: Blue = home team win; Yellow = draw; Red = away team win.

=== Second half of season ===
Home \ Away	FLO	NÕM	KUR	LEV	PAI	SIL	T.K	TAM	NAR	VIL
Flora		1–0	2–0	1–2	3–0	4–0	3–1	5–1	0–1	5–0
Nõmme Kalju	2–0		6–1	2–2	1–1	2–2	7–0	5–1	1–0	3–0
Kuressaare	0–2	0–9		0–1	1–1	1–2	2–1	3–2	0–3	3–3
Levadia	5–4	0–1	7–0		4–0	0–2	4–1	3–0	0–2	2–1
Paide	0–6	0–2	1–1	1–2		2–0	0–0	4–1	2–3	0–2
Sillamäe Kalev	1–2	0–2	2–1	1–1	1–2		3–0	3–1	0–3	2–2
Tallinna Kalev	1–1	1–3	0–3	0–6	0–3	0–3		1–4	0–1	2–2
Tammeka	0–3	1–4	2–2	0–3	1–1	0–3	1–1		2–1	4–0
Narva Trans	2–2	0–2	2–0	0–6	0–0	0–1	1–1	4–0		1–1
Viljandi	0–2	1–9	6–0	0–5	0–2	0–5	2–1	0–0	2–5	

Source: Estonian Football Association
Legend: Blue = home team win; Yellow = draw; Red = away team win.

== Season statistics ==
=== Top scorers ===
Rank	Player	Club	Goals
1	(Russia) Vladislav Ivanov	Sillamäe Kalev/Narva Trans	23
2	(Estonia) Tarmo Neemelo	Nõmme Kalju	22
3	(Georgia (country)) Zakaria Beglarishvili	Flora	17
4	(Estonia) Jüri Jevdokimov	Nõmme Kalju	13
5	(Estonia) Igor Morozov	Levadia	12
6	(Estonia) Rimo Hunt	Levadia	11
7	(Russia) Aleksandr Alekseev	Narva Trans	10
7	(Estonia) Andre Frolov	Flora	10
7	(Estonia) Artur Rättel	Levadia	10
7	(Japan) Hidetoshi Wakui	Nõmme Kalju	10

=== Hat-tricks ===
Player	For	Against	Result	Date
(Estonia) Vitali Leitan	Levadia	Kuressaare	5–0	10 April 2012
(Estonia) Artur Rättel	Levadia	Paide Linnameeskond	1–5	28 April 2012
(Georgia (country)) Zakaria Beglarishvili	Flora	Paide Linnameeskond	0–5	12 May 2012
(Georgia (country)) Zakaria Beglarishvili	Flora	Tallinna Kalev	5–0	19 May 2012
(Estonia) Artur Rättel	Levadia	Tallinna Kalev	0–6	23 July 2012
(Estonia) Albert Taar	Levadia	Kuressaare	7–0	30 July 2012
(Estonia) Igor Morozov	Levadia	Flora	5–4	20 August 2012
(Estonia) Tarmo Neemelo	Nõmme Kalju	Kuressaare	0–9	28 August 2012
(Estonia) Rauno Alliku	Flora	Viljandi	5–0	18 September 2012
(Russia) Vladislav Ivanov	Narva Trans	Kuressaare	0–3	22 September 2012
(Estonia) Tarmo Neemelo ^{5}	Nõmme Kalju	Viljandi	1–9	2 October 2012
(Guinea) Ousmane Barry	Tammeka	Tallinna Kalev	1–4	20 October 2012
(Italy) Damiano Quintieri	Nõmme Kalju	Tammeka	5–1	3 November 2012
(Estonia) Vjatšeslav Zahovaiko	Sillamäe Kalev	Viljandi	0–5	3 November 2012

- ^{5} Player scored 5 goals.

=== Average attendance ===
Club	Average attendance
Nõmme JK Kalju	339
Tallina FC Levadia	273
Tartu JK Tammeka	251
Tallinna FC Flora	227
JK Tallinna Kalev	195
JK Sillamäe Kalev	163
Paide Linnameeskond	144
JK Narva Trans	117
FC Kuressaare	108
FC Viljandi	90
League average	191

== Awards ==
Month	Manager of the Month		Player of the Month	
Month	Manager	Club	Player	Club
March	(Estonia) Sergei Zamogilnõi	Kuressaare	(Estonia) Igor Morozov	Levadia
April	(Estonia) Igor Prins	Nõmme Kalju	(Estonia) Janar Toomet	Levadia
May	(Estonia) Martin Reim	Flora	(Georgia (country)) Zakaria Beglarishvili	Flora
June	(Estonia) Meelis Rooba	Paide Linnameeskond	(Japan) Hidetoshi Wakui	Nõmme Kalju
July	(Estonia) Igor Prins	Nõmme Kalju	(Estonia) Joel Indermitte	Viljandi
August	(Russia) Aleksei Yagudin	Narva Trans	(Estonia) Sergei Terehhov	Nõmme Kalju
September	(Estonia) Igor Prins	Nõmme Kalju	(Estonia) Carl Tubarik	Paide Linnameeskond
October	(Estonia) Marko Kristal	Levadia	(Georgia (country)) Zakaria Beglarishvili	Flora

== See also ==
- 2011–12 Estonian Cup
- 2012–13 Estonian Cup
