= 2013 Meistriliiga =

Estonian national championships in football

Meistriliiga
- Season: 2013
- Champions: Levadia; 8th title
- Relegated: Kuressaare
- Champions League: Levadia
- Europa League: Nõmme Kalju; Sillamäe Kalev
- Matches: 180
- Goals: 510 (2.83 per match)
- Top goalscorer: Vladimir Voskoboinikov (23 goals)
- Biggest home win: Flora 6–0 Kuressaare (21 May); Sillamäe Kalev 6–0 Tammeka (26 October)
- Biggest away win: Tallinna Kalev 0–9 Sillamäe Kalev (2 November)
- Highest scoring: Tallinna Kalev 0–9 Sillamäe Kalev (2 November)
- Longest winning run: 8 matches Levadia (13 April–24 May); Levadia (9 July–21 September)
- Longest unbeaten run: 15 matches Nõmme Kalju (18 June–28 September)
- Longest winless run: 16 matches Kuressaare (2 August–9 November)
- Longest losing run: 9 matches Kuressaare (17 September–9 November)

The 2013 Meistriliiga (also known as A. Le Coq Premium Liiga for sponsorship reasons) was the 23rd season of the Meistriliiga, the first level in the Estonian football system. The season began on 2 March 2013 and ended on 9 November 2013. Nõmme Kalju, the defending champions, finished runners-up behind Levadia, who won their 8th title.

== Teams ==
2012 Esiliiga champions Infonet, who lost out to Kuressaare in the promotion/relegation play-off as Esiliiga Runners-up in 2011, were promoted to this season's Meistriliiga making their first appearance in the top division. Esiliiga runners-up Tarvas lost out on promotion as Meistriliiga's 9th placed club Tallinna Kalev defeated them 3–1 on aggregate in the Promotion/relegation play-off.

Tammeka finished at the bottom of the 2012 season but escaped relegation due to dissolving of seventh place Viljandi.

=== Stadiums and locations ===
Location of the 2013 Meistriliiga teams

Team	Location	Stadium	Seating capacity
Flora	Tallinn	A. Le Coq Arena	9,692
Infonet	Tallinn	Sportland Arena	540
Kuressaare	Kuressaare	Kuressaare Linnastaadion	1,000
Levadia	Tallinn	Kadriorg Stadium	5,000
Narva Trans	Narva	Kreenholm Stadium	1,065
Nõmme Kalju	Tallinn	Kadriorg Stadium	5,000
Paide Linnameeskond	Paide	Paide linnastaadion	368
Sillamäe Kalev	Sillamäe	Sillamäe Kalev Stadium	800
Tallinna Kalev	Tallinn	Kalevi Keskstaadion	11,500
Tammeka	Tartu	Tamme Stadium	1,750

=== Personnel and kits ===
Note: Flags indicate national team as has been defined under FIFA eligibility rules. Players and Managers may hold more than one non-FIFA nationality.

Team	Manager	Captain	Kit manufacturer	Shirt sponsor
Flora	(Estonia) Norbert Hurt	(Estonia) Sander Post	Nike	
Infonet	(Estonia) Aleksandr Puštov	(Estonia) Jevgeni Gurtšioglujants	Joma	Infonet
Kuressaare	(Estonia) Sergei Zamogilnõi	(Estonia) Sander Viira	Joma	Saaremaa Lihatööstus
Levadia	(Estonia) Marko Kristal	(Ukraine) Roman Smishko	Adidas	Viimsi Keevitus
Narva Trans	(Estonia) Valeri Bondarenko	(Estonia) Stanislav Kitto	Nike	Sportland
Nõmme Kalju	(Estonia) Igor Prins	(Estonia) Alo Bärengrub	Adidas	Maxima
Paide Linnameeskond	(Estonia) Meelis Rooba	(Estonia) Carl Tubarik	Nike	Verston
Sillamäe Kalev	(Estonia) Sergei Ratnikov	(Estonia) Vjatšeslav Zahovaiko	Uhlsport	Alexela
Tallinna Kalev	(Germany) Frank Bernhardt	(Estonia) Ats Sillaste	Jako	Viking Line
Tammeka	(Germany) Uwe Erkenbrecher	(Estonia) Kristjan Tiirik	Nike	Tartu

=== Managerial changes ===
Team	Outgoing manager	Manner of departure	Date of vacancy	Position in table	Replaced by	Date of appointment
Tallinna Kalev	(Estonia) Sergei Ratnikov	Mutual agreement	18 November 2012	Pre-season	(Germany) Frank Bernhardt	4 December 2012
Tammeka	(Greece) Joti Stamatopoulos	Resigned	22 November 2012	Pre-season	(Germany) Uwe Erkenbrecher	8 January 2013
Sillamäe Kalev	(Lithuania) Algimantas Briaunys	Contract terminated	2 April 2013	4th	(Estonia) Sergei Ratnikov	2 April 2013
Narva Trans	(Russia) Aleksei Yagudin	Mutual agreement	8 April 2013	10th	(Estonia) Valeri Bondarenko	8 April 2013
Flora	(Estonia) Marko Lelov	Sacked	20 July 2013	3rd	(Estonia) Norbert Hurt (caretaker)	21 July 2013

=== Player transfers ===
- Transfers made during the 2012–13 winter transfer window:
- Transfers made during the 2013 summer transfer window:

== League table ==
Pos	Team	Pld	W	D	L	GF	GA	GD	Pts	Qualification or relegation
1	Levadia (C)	36	30	1	5	69	24	+45	91	Qualification for Champions League first qualifying round
2	Nõmme Kalju	36	26	6	4	78	23	+55	84	Qualification for Europa League first qualifying round
3	Sillamäe Kalev	36	23	6	7	75	22	+53	75	Qualification for Europa League first qualifying round
4	Flora	36	21	5	10	83	40	+43	68	
5	Paide	36	15	2	19	43	58	−15	47	
6	Infonet	36	10	8	18	36	56	−20	38	
7	Narva Trans	36	11	3	22	39	55	−16	36	
8	Tallinna Kalev	36	10	4	22	35	77	−42	34	
9	Tammeka (O)	36	8	8	20	30	68	−38	32	Qualification for relegation play-offs
10	Kuressaare (R)	36	2	5	29	22	87	−65	11	Relegation to Esiliiga

Source: Estonian Football Association (in Estonian)
Rules for classification: 1) points; 2) least withdrawals or annulled matches; 3) overall wins; 4) head-to-head points; 5) head-to-head goal difference; 6) goal difference; 7) goals scored; 8) away goals scored; 9) fair-play points.
If two (or more) teams on the top have the same number of points by the end of the season, the aforementioned rules will not apply and additional game(s) will be played to determine the champions
Europa League spot from 2013–14 Estonian Cup in this season went to 4th tier club Tartu FC Santos
(C) Champions; (O) Play-off winners; (R) Relegated

=== Relegation play-offs ===
Tammeka as 9th-placed team faced 2013 Esiliiga side Rakvere Tarvas in a two-legged play-off for the spot in next year's competition.

17 November 2013
13:00 EET (GMT+2)

Tarvas	1–2	Tammeka
Rebane 80'	Report	Tekko 26'; Tomson 68'

Rakvere Kunstmurustaadion, Rakvere
Attendance: 350
Referee: Jaan Roos
23 November 2013
13:00 EET (GMT+2)

Tammeka	4–1	Tarvas
Tamm 9', 62'; Sahkur 13' (o.g.); Tomson 21'	Report	Hang 51'

Valga Keskstaadion, Valga
Attendance: 174
Referee: Kristo Külljastinen

Tammeka won 6–2 on aggregate and retained their Meistriliiga spot for the 2014 season.

== Results ==
Each team plays every opponent four times, twice at home and twice away, for a total of 36 games.

=== First half of season ===
Home \ Away	FLO	INF	NÕM	KUR	LEV	PAI	SIL	T.K	TAM	NAR
Flora		1–1	1–0	6–0	0–3	1–0	3–0	4–1	2–0	1–0
Infonet	0–2		0–3	0–0	0–1	1–2	-:1 (Note: Sillamäe Kalev were awarded a -:1 win as Infonet fielded an ineligible player. The match ended 0–1.)	2–0	0–0	1–0
Nõmme Kalju	4–3	2–0		2–1	1–0	1–0	0–0	2–0	2–0	4–0
Kuressaare	2–4	1–1	0–1		0–1	0–1	1–4	1–3	0–0	2–0
Levadia	1–0	2–1	1–0	2–1		1–0	0–0	1–0	3–1	3–0
Paide	0–6	4–0	2–3	3–0	3–4		2–1	2–1	6–2	0–1
Sillamäe Kalev	2–1	3–0	1–1	4–0	2–0	3–0		0–0	1–1	3–2
Tallinna Kalev	2–4	1–4	1–3	1–0	0–1	1–0	1–0		0–2	1–2
Tammeka	1–4	0–3	0–3	3–1	2–1	0–1	0–2	3–0		1–1
Narva Trans	0–3	1–1	2–0	2–0	1–0	0–1	1–2	1–1	1–2	

Source: Estonian Football Association
Legend: Blue = home team win; Yellow = draw; Red = away team win.

=== Second half of season ===
Home \ Away	FLO	INF	NÕM	KUR	LEV	PAI	SIL	T.K	TAM	NAR
Flora		2–3	0–3	4–0	1–2	0–0	0–3	5–0	2–2	2–0
Infonet	1–2		1–1	1–1	0–3	1–2	1–0	0–1	3–1	3–2
Nõmme Kalju	2–2	5–0		4–0	2–1	2–0	1–0	4–2	3–0	3–1
Kuressaare	0–1	0–3	0–4		2–4	1–2	0–5	1–4	0–0	1–0
Levadia	3–1	3–0	2–1	2–1		1–0	1–0	5–0	2–0	2–1
Paide	0–5	2–0	0–4	4–1	1–3		0–3	1–0	1–2	0–3
Sillamäe Kalev	2–1	2–0	1–1	2–0	1–2	3–1		2–0	6–0	2–1
Tallinna Kalev	1–1	3–1	1–1	3–1	1–4	1–2	0–9		2–1	0–4
Tammeka	0–4	1–1	0–3	3–2	0–2	0–0	0–3	0–1		1–2
Narva Trans	1–4	1–2	0–2	3–1	0–2	2–0	0–2	3–1	0–1	

Source: Estonian Football Association
Legend: Blue = home team win; Yellow = draw; Red = away team win.

== Season statistics ==
=== Top scorers ===
Rank	Player	Club	Goals
1	(Estonia) Vladimir Voskoboinikov	Nõmme Kalju	23
2	(Estonia) Rimo Hunt	Levadia	22
3	(France) Kassim Aidara	Sillamäe Kalev	17
4	(Estonia) Albert Prosa	Flora	16
4	(Estonia) Vjatšeslav Zahovaiko	Sillamäe Kalev	16
6	(Japan) Hidetoshi Wakui	Nõmme Kalju	15
7	(Estonia) Sander Post	Flora	14
8	(Estonia) Tarmo Neemelo	Nõmme Kalju	11
9	(Russia) Yevgeni Kabaev	Sillamäe Kalev	10
10	(Estonia) Rauno Alliku	Flora	9
10	(Russia) Nikolai Mashichev	Sillamäe Kalev	9
10	(Estonia) Artur Rättel	Levadia	9

=== Hat-tricks ===
Player	For	Against	Result	Date
(Netherlands) Sander van de Streek	Flora	Paide Linnameeskond	6–0 (A)	9 March 2013
(Estonia) Sander Post ^{4}	Flora	Kuressaare	6–0 (H)	21 May 2013
(Estonia) Vladimir Voskoboinikov	Nõmme Kalju	Flora	4–3 (H)	31 May 2013
(Estonia) Vjatšeslav Zahovaiko	Sillamäe Kalev	Tammeka	3–0 (A)	3 August 2013
(Estonia) Rimo Hunt	Levadia	Tallinna Kalev	4–1 (A)	20 August 2013
(Russia) Yevgeni Kabaev	Sillamäe Kalev	Tammeka	6–0 (H)	26 October 2013
(France) Kassim Aidara	Sillamäe Kalev	Tallinna Kalev	9–0 (A)	2 November 2013
(Estonia) Rimo Hunt	Levadia	Kuressaare	4–2 (A)	9 November 2013
(Estonia) Vladimir Voskoboinikov	Nõmme Kalju	Tammeka	3–0 (A)	9 November 2013

- ^{4} Player scored 4 goals.

=== Average attendance ===
Club	Average attendance
Tartu JK Tammeka	357
Tallinna FC Flora	336
Tallinna FC Levadia	305
Nõmme JK Kalju	250
JK Sillamäe Kalev	180
Paide Linnameeskond	178
Tallinna FC Infonet	155
JK Tallinna Kalev	147
FC Kuressaare	138
JK Narva Trans	107
League average	215

== Awards ==
Month	Manager of the Month		Player of the Month	
Month	Manager	Club	Player	Club
March	(Estonia) Marko Kristal	Levadia	(Japan) Hidetoshi Wakui	Nõmme Kalju
April	(Estonia) Meelis Rooba	Paide Linnameeskond	(Estonia) Rimo Hunt	Levadia
May	(Estonia) Valeri Bondarenko	Narva Trans	(Estonia) Vladimir Voskoboinikov	Nõmme Kalju
June	(Germany) Uwe Erkenbrecher	Tammeka	(Russia) Nikolai Mashichev	Sillamäe Kalev
July	(Estonia) Sergei Ratnikov	Sillamäe Kalev	(Estonia) Lauri Varendi	Paide Linnameeskond
August	(Estonia) Marko Kristal	Levadia	(France) Kassim Aidara	Sillamäe Kalev
September	(Estonia) Igor Prins	Nõmme Kalju	(France) Allan Kimbaloula	Nõmme Kalju
October	(Estonia) Marko Kristal	Levadia	(Estonia) Rimo Hunt	Levadia

== See also ==
- 2013 Esiliiga
- 2013 Esiliiga B
- 2012–13 Estonian Cup
- 2013–14 Estonian Cup
