= Andre Frolov =

Estonian footballer (born 1988)

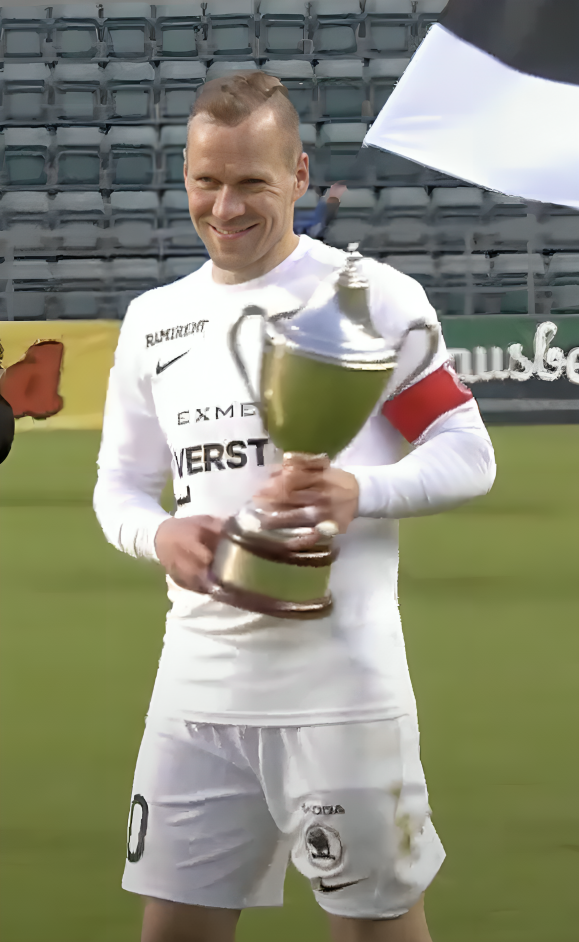
- Frolov with Paide in 2022

Personal information
- Full name: Andre Frolov
- Date of birth: 18 April 1988 (age 38)
- Place of birth: Emmaste, then part of Estonian SSR, Soviet Union
- Height: 1.74 m (5 ft 8 1/2 in)
- Position: Midfielder

Team information
- Current team: Nõmme United
- Number: 10

Senior career*
Years	Team	Apps	(Gls)
2004	Lelle	16	(1)
2005–2016	Flora	192	(31)
2007–2016	Flora U21	79	(25)
2005	→ Tervis (loan)	31	(11)
2006	→ Warrior (loan)	32	(1)
2008	→ Tulevik II (loan)	3	(1)
2008–2009	→ Tulevik (loan)	50	(6)
2017–2024	Paide Linnameeskond	247	(32)
2025–	Nõmme United	69	(10)

International career^{‡}
	Estonia U19	5	(0)
2009–2010	Estonia U21	12	(0)
2010–2012	Estonia U23	5	(0)
2012–2021	Estonia	6	(0)
- * Club domestic league appearances and goals as of 10 November 2026 ‡ National team caps and goals as of 10 September 2021

Andre Frolov (born 18 April 1988) is an Estonian professional footballer who plays as a midfielder for Estonian Meistriliiga club Nõmme United. Since 2024, he holds the record for most appearances in Meistriliiga.

== Club career ==
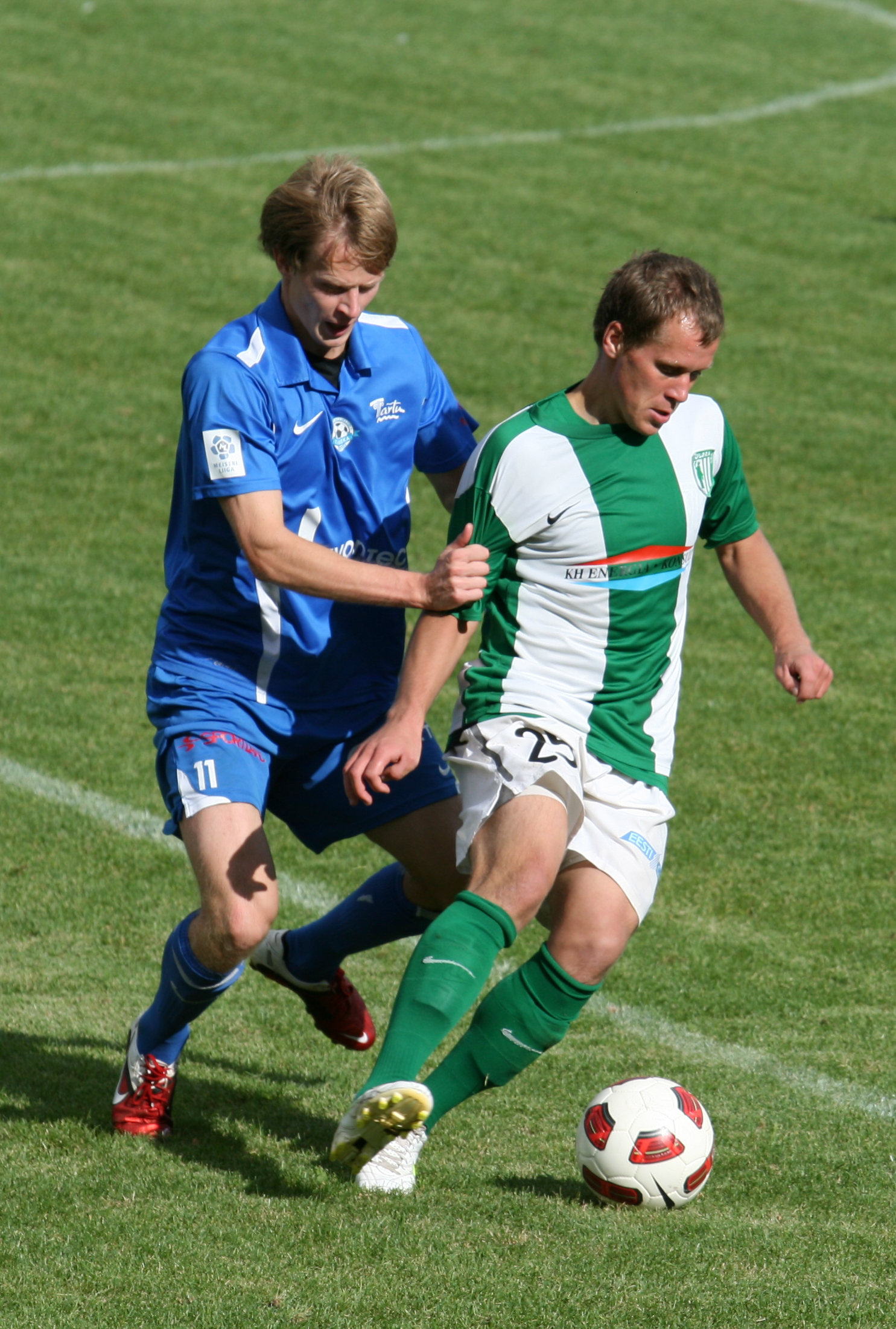
Frolov with Flora in 2011

=== Flora ===
Frolov started playing football with Flora's youth academy. He spent several years playing for various reserve and feeder teams affiliated with Flora, before becoming a regular with the main team. He won his first Meistriliiga title with Flora in the 2010 season, and his second one in the 2011 season, having scored 3 goals. He went on to score another 10 goals in the following 2012 Meistriliiga season and becoming an integral part of the first team as Flora finished in third place. On 19 October 2012, Frolov was appointed as Flora captain for the remainder of season. In the 2015 season, Frolov won his third Meistriliiga title.

=== Paide Linnameeskond ===
On 29 December 2016, Frolov signed a two-year contract with Paide Linnameeskond. He captained the club to their first-ever trophy, as Paide Linnameeskond lifted the Estonian Cup in the 2021–22 season. In 2023, Frolov captained the club to their first Estonian Supercup victory. On 21 September 2024, Frolov made his 518th Meistriliiga appearance during Paide's 4–3 victory against Kuressaare, and became the most capped player in the Estonian top flight.

== International career ==
Frolov made his international debut for Estonia on 8 November 2012 against Oman, coming off the bench during the 74th minute as a substitute for Ats Purje. On the 88th minute he delivered a corner kick which took a deflection off Taavi Rähn before being headed into the net by Flora teammate Gert Kams.

== Honours ==
=== Club ===
Flora

- Meistriliiga: 2010, 2011, 2015
- Estonian Cup: 2010–11, 2012–13, 2015–16
- Estonian Supercup: 2011, 2012, 2014

Paide Linnameeskond

- Estonian Cup: 2021–22
- Estonian Supercup: 2023

Nõmme United

- Esiliiga: 2025
