= FC Viljandi =

FC Viljandi may refer to:

- FC Elva, Estonian football club founded in 2000 as FC Viljandi
- FC Viljandi (2011), Estonian football club founded in 2011
