= Rimo Hunt =

Estonian footballer

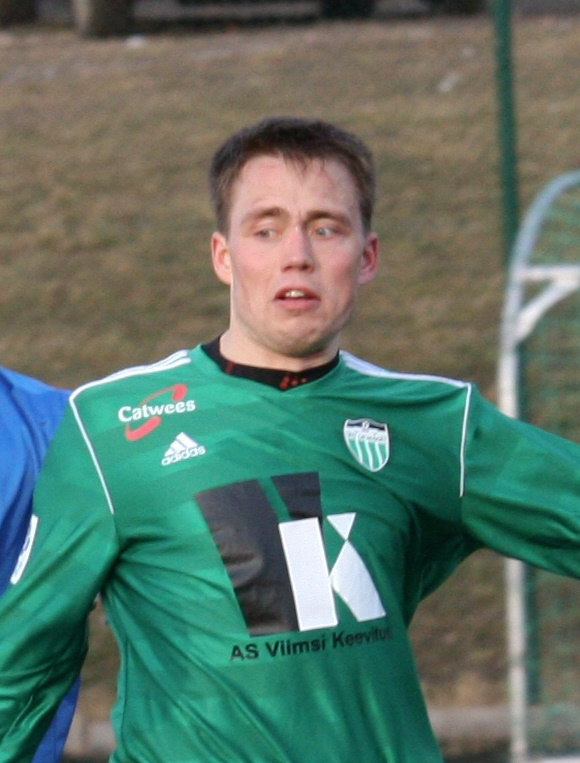
- Hunt with Levadia in 2012

Personal information
- Full name: Rimo Hunt
- Date of birth: 5 November 1985 (age 40)
- Place of birth: Dirhami, then part of Estonian SSR, Soviet Union
- Height: 1.87 m (6 ft 1 1/2 in)
- Position: Forward

Youth career
- 2002–2004: FCF Haapsalu

Senior career*
Years	Team	Apps	(Gls)
2004	Haapsalu	6	(3)
2007	Kaitseliit Kalev	1	(2)
2007–2010	M.C. Tallinn	66	(56)
2011	Tallinna Kalev II	1	(0)
2011	Tallinna Kalev	30	(35)
2012–2013	Levadia	69	(33)
2014–2015	Kaysar Kyzylorda	50	(9)
2016–2017	Levadia	67	(27)
2018	Nõmme Kalju	32	(14)

International career^{‡}
2013–2014	Estonia	7	(1)
- * Club domestic league appearances and goals as of 15 January 2019 (UTC) ‡ National team caps and goals as of 15 February 2018

Rimo Hunt (born 5 November 1985) is an Estonian former professional footballer. He played as a striker for Estonian clubs Tallinna Kalev, Levadia, Nõmme Kalju and Kazakh club Kaysar Kyzylorda.

Hunt made his international debut for the Estonia national team on 3 June 2013 in a friendly against Belarus. He made a total of 7 appearances for Estonia before retiring.

== Club career ==
=== Tallinna Kalev ===
Hunt scored 35 goals in 30 matches in the 2011 season, helping Tallinna Kalev win the Esiliiga and earn promotion to the Meistriliiga. He was named Esiliiga Player of the Year.

=== Levadia ===
On 9 February 2012, Hunt signed for Meistriliiga club Levadia. He scored 11 goals in 35 games as Levadia finished the 2012 season as runners-up. He won the Meistriliiga title in the 2013 season, and was Levadia's top goalscorer in the league with 22 goals.

=== Kaysar Kyzylorda ===
On 7 February 2014, Hunt signed a one-year contract with Kazakhstan Premier League club Kaysar Kyzylorda.

=== Return to Levadia ===
On 28 January 2016, Hunt returned to Levadia and was named team captain ahead of the 2016 season. He was the team's top scorer in the 2017 season with 20 goals.

=== Nõmme Kalju ===
On 15 February 2018, Hunt signed a one-year contract with Meistriliiga club Nõmme Kalju, with the option to extend the contract for another year.

== International career ==
On 28 May 2013, Hunt was called up to the Estonia squad for friendly matches against Belarus, Trinidad and Tobago and Kyrgyzstan. He made his international debut on 4 June 2013, replacing Kristen Viikmäe in his testimonial match, a 0–2 home loss against Belarus. He scored his first international goal for Estonia on 5 March 2014, in a 2–0 away win over Gibraltar in a friendly.

=== International goals ===
Estonia score listed first, score column indicates score after each Hunt goal.

International goals by date, venue, cap, opponent, score, result and competition
No.	Date	Venue	Cap	Opponent	Score	Result	Competition
1	5 March 2014	Victoria Stadium, Gibraltar	5	Gibraltar	2–0	2–0	Friendly

== Honours ==
=== Club ===
Tallinna Kalev

- Esiliiga: 2011

Levadia

- Meistriliiga: 2013
- Estonian Cup: 2011–12
- Estonian Supercup: 2013

=== Individual ===
- Meistriliiga Player of the Year: 2013
- Esiliiga Player of the Year: 2011
- Meistriliiga Player of the Month: April 2013, October 2013, April 2017
