= Andrei Veis =

Estonian footballer

Personal information
- Full name: Andrei Veis
- Date of birth: 6 April 1990 (age 36)
- Positions: Defender; midfielder

Senior career*
Years	Team	Apps	(Gls)
2006	Paide Linnameeskond	22	(1)
2007	FC Warrior Valga	27	(5)
2008	FC Flora II Tallinn	30	(3)
2009	JK Viljandi Tulevik	20	(0)
2010	FC Flora II Tallinn	23	(1)
2010	FC Flora Tallinn	13	(0)
2011	FC Viljandi	35	(5)
2012	JK Sillamäe Kalev	12	(0)
2012–2018	Paide Linnameeskond	47	(3)

International career^{‡}
2011	Estonia	2	(0)
- * Club domestic league appearances and goals as of 1 January 2013 ‡ National team caps and goals as of 9 February 2012

Andrei Veis (born 6 April 1990) is an Estonian retired international footballer who played as a defender and a midfielder.

== Career ==
Veis has played club football for Paide Linnameeskond, Warrior Valga, Flora II Tallinn, Viljandi Tulevik and Flora Tallinn.

On 9 February 2012, JK Sillamäe Kalev announced that he had signed a contract with the club, alongside three other players.

He made his international debut for Estonia in 2011.
