= Hidetoshi Wakui =

Japanese footballer

Hidetoshi Wakui 和久井 秀俊
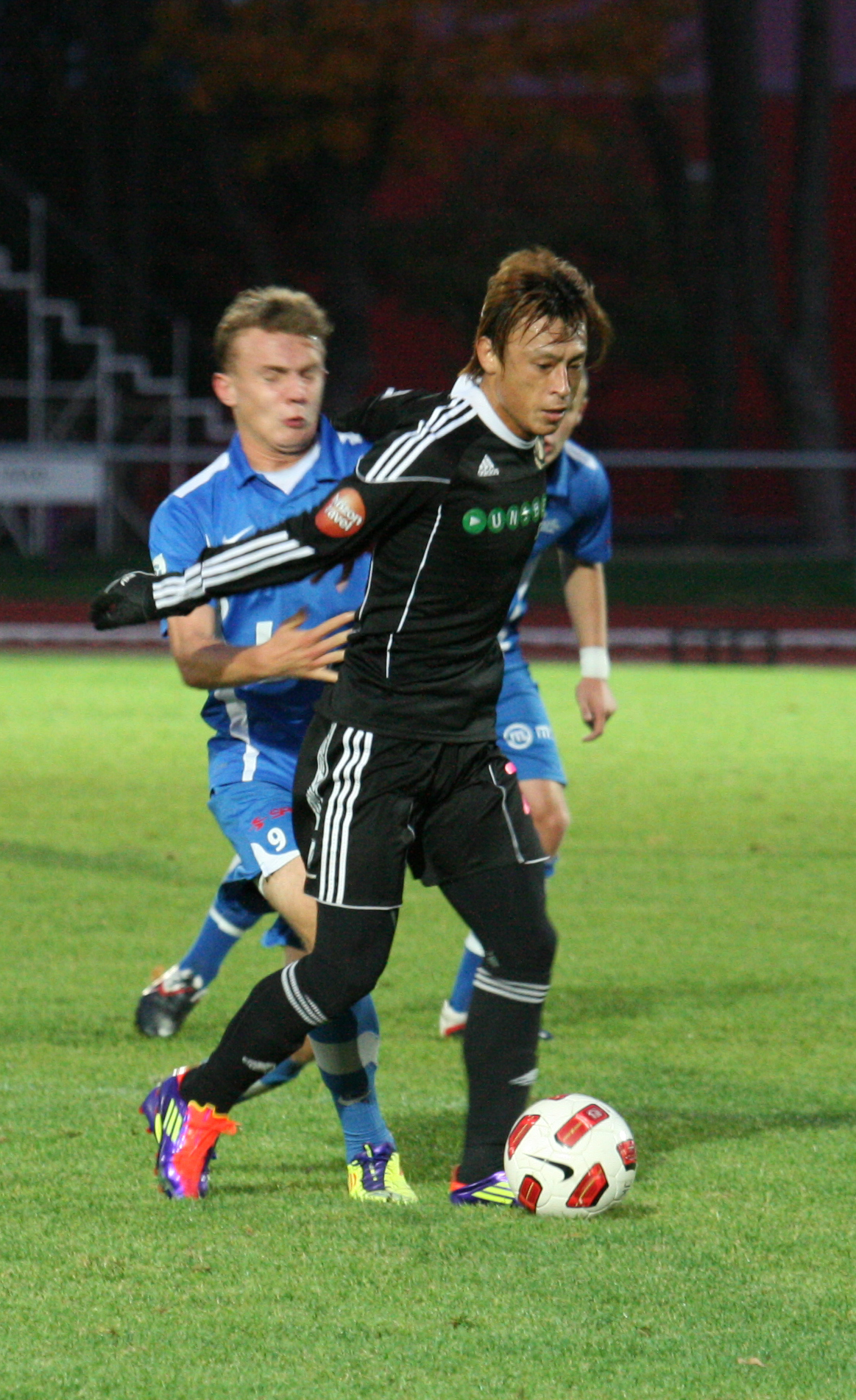
- Wakui playing for Nõmme Kalju FC

Personal information
- Full name: Hidetoshi Wakui
- Date of birth: 12 February 1983 (age 43)
- Place of birth: Tochigi, Japan
- Height: 1.73 m (5 ft 8 in)
- Position: Midfielder

Youth career
- 1998–2000: Kanuma Higashi High School

Senior career*
Years	Team	Apps	(Gls)
2001–2002	Santo André	0	(0)
2003	Albirex Niigata	0	(0)
2004–2005	→ Albirex Niigata Singapore	52	(9)
2006–2007	Interblock	39	(6)
2007–2008	Bad Aussee	15	(1)
2008	Gorica	10	(0)
2009–2010	Bohemians Prague	10	(0)
2010	Minsk	2	(0)
2011–2016	Nõmme Kalju	176	(67)
2016	→ Nõmme Kalju U21	5	(1)
2017	Gnistan	11	(0)
2018	Tallinna Kalev	31	(9)
2019–2020	Gnistan	42	(6)
- * Club domestic league appearances and goals as of 31 December 2020

Hidetoshi Wakui (和久井 秀俊, Wakui Hidetoshi; born 12 February 1983) is a Japanese former football player.

== Honours ==
=== Club ===
Nõmme Kalju

- Meistriliiga (1): 2012
  - Runner-up (2): 2011, 2013

Factor Ljubljana

- Slovenian Second League (1): 2005–06

Gorica

- Slovenian PrvaLiga Runner-up (1): 2008–09

Minsk

- Belarusian Premier League 3rd (1): 2010

=== Individual ===
Nõmme Kalju

- Meistriliiga Team of the Year: 2011, 2012
- Meistriliiga Midfielder of the Year: 2011, 2012
- Meistriliiga Player of the Year (Runner-up) : 2011, 2012
- MeistriliigaPlayer of the Month (3): August 2011, June 2012, March 2013
- Meistriliiga Team of the Month: March 2011, April 2011, June 2011, August 2011, September 2011
- Meistriliiga Best Transfer (Runner-up): 2011

== Club statistics ==
As of 10 November 2013

Season	Team	Country	Division	League				Europe
Season	Team	Country	Division	Apps	Goals	Assists	Position	Competitions	Apps	Goals
2003	Albirex Niigata	Japan	2	0	0	0	1 (C) (P)
2004	Albirex Niigata Singapore	Singapore	1	26	4	N/A	5
2005	Albirex Niigata Singapore	Singapore	1	26	5	7	5
2005–2006	Factor Ljubljana	Slovenia	2	13	2	N/A	1 (C) (P)
2006–2007	Factor / Interblock Ljubljana	Slovenia	1	26	4	N/A	9
2007–2008	SV Bad Aussee	Austria	2	15	1	N/A	12 (R)
2008–2009	ND Gorica	Slovenia	1	10	0	N/A	2
2009–2010	FK Bohemians Praha	Czech Republic	1	10	0	N/A	16 (R)
2010	FC Minsk	Belarus	1	2	0	0	3
2011	JK Nõmme Kalju	Estonia	1	35	7	N/A	2	UEL	2	0
2012	JK Nõmme Kalju	Estonia	1	35	10	N/A	1 (C)	UEL	2	1
2013	JK Nõmme Kalju	Estonia	1	30	15	N/A	2	UCL	4	0
2013	JK Nõmme Kalju	Estonia	1	30	15	N/A	2	UEL	2	0
Total	JK Nõmme Kalju	Estonia	1	100	32	N/A			10	1
Career Total				229	48	7			10	1

- (C) = Champion; (R) = Relegated; (P) = Promoted
