= Joel Indermitte =

Estonian footballer (born 1992)

Personal information
- Full name: Joel Indermitte
- Date of birth: 27 December 1992 (age 33)
- Place of birth: Tallinn, Estonia
- Height: 1.92 m (6 ft 3 1/2 in)
- Position: Centre back

Youth career
- FC Kotkas
- Flora Tallinn

Senior career*
Years	Team	Apps	(Gls)
2008	Warrior Valga	3	(0)
2008–2009	Flora II Tallinn	44	(3)
2008	→ Elva (loan)	1	(0)
2010	Tulevik Viljandi	30	(2)
2010	→ Warrior Valga (loan)	8	(2)
2011–2012	Viljandi	69	(6)
2013	Kuressaare	35	(3)
2014	Paide Linnameeskond	19	(0)
2014–2015	Atarfe CF	1	(1)
2015	Paide Linnameeskond	0	(0)
2016–2018	JK Tabasalu	24	(2)

International career
- Estonia U17
2010–2011	Estonia U19	15	(2)
2011–2014	Estonia U21	17	(1)
2012	Estonia U23	1	(0)
2011	Estonia	2	(0)
- * Club domestic league appearances and goals

Joel Indermitte (born 27 December 1992) is a retired Estonian footballer and current football manager. He played the position of centre back.

== International career ==
Indermitte is a member of the Estonia national under-19 football team and former member of Estonia national under-17 football team. In June 2011, he was called up to Estonia to face Chile and Uruguay. He was one of eight players that debuted against Chile on 19 June 2011, when the team lost 0–4.

== Honours ==
Individual

- Meistriliiga Player of the Month: July 2012,
