= Allan Kimbaloula =

Congolese footballer (born 1992)

Personal information
- Full name: Allan-Axel Kimbaloula
- Date of birth: 1 January 1992 (age 34)
- Place of birth: Tourcoing, France
- Height: 1.82 m (6 ft 0 in)
- Position: Midfielder

Team information
- Current team: Acren Lessines

Youth career
- CS Blénod
- Lille

Senior career*
Years	Team	Apps	(Gls)
2010–2012	Lille B	26	(0)
2013–2015	Nõmme Kalju	67	(16)
2017	Sportul Snagov	3	(1)
2017	Foresta Suceava	7	(0)
2018	Kallithea	9	(0)
2019	Acren Lessines		
2019	KSV Oudenaarde		
2020	Grande-Synthe		
2020–	Acren Lessines		

International career^{‡}
2014	Congo	1	(0)
- * Club domestic league appearances and goals as of 22:27, 4 May 2020 (UTC) ‡ National team caps and goals as of 2017-12-12

Allan-Axel Kimbaloula (born 1 January 1992) is a professional footballer who plays as a midfielder for Belgian club KSV Oudenaarde. Born in France, he has represented the Congo national team.

== Club career ==
Kimbaloula joined Lille OSC when he was nine, but left the team in summer 2012 without making a first team appearance. In January 2013 he signed a two-year contract with defending Estonian club Nõmme Kalju, having rejected a contract offer from English Premier League side Norwich City.

Ahead of the 2019–20 season, Kimbaloula joined Belgian Second Amateur Division side KSV Oudenaarde. In January 2020, he moved back to France and joined Régional 1 club Olympique Grande-Synthe. In the summer 2020, Kimbaloula returned to Acren Lessines.

== International career ==
Born in France to Cameroonian mother and Congolese father, Kimbaloula was eligible to play for any of these three countries, choosing the latter. He acquired French nationality on 20 December 2001, through the collective effect of his father's naturalization.

On 17 February 2014, he made his international debut for the Congo national team in a 2015 Africa Cup of Nations qualification match against Namibia.

== Career statistics ==
As of match played 26 September 2015

Appearances and goals by club, season and competition
Club	Season	League			National cup		Continental		Other		Total	
Club	Season	Division	Apps	Goals	Apps	Goals	Apps	Goals	Apps	Goals	Apps	Goals
Nõmme Kalju	2013	Meistriliiga	32	6	3	0	6	0	1	0	42	6
Nõmme Kalju	2014	Meistriliiga	15	4	0	0	1	0	–		16	4
Nõmme Kalju	2015	Meistriliiga	20	6	3	2	4	0	–		27	8
Nõmme Kalju	Total		67	16	6	2	11	0	1	0	85	18
Career total			67	16	6	2	11	0	1	0	85	18

== Honours ==
Individual

- Meistriliiga Player of the Month: September 2013
