= Igor Prins =

Estonian manager and footballer

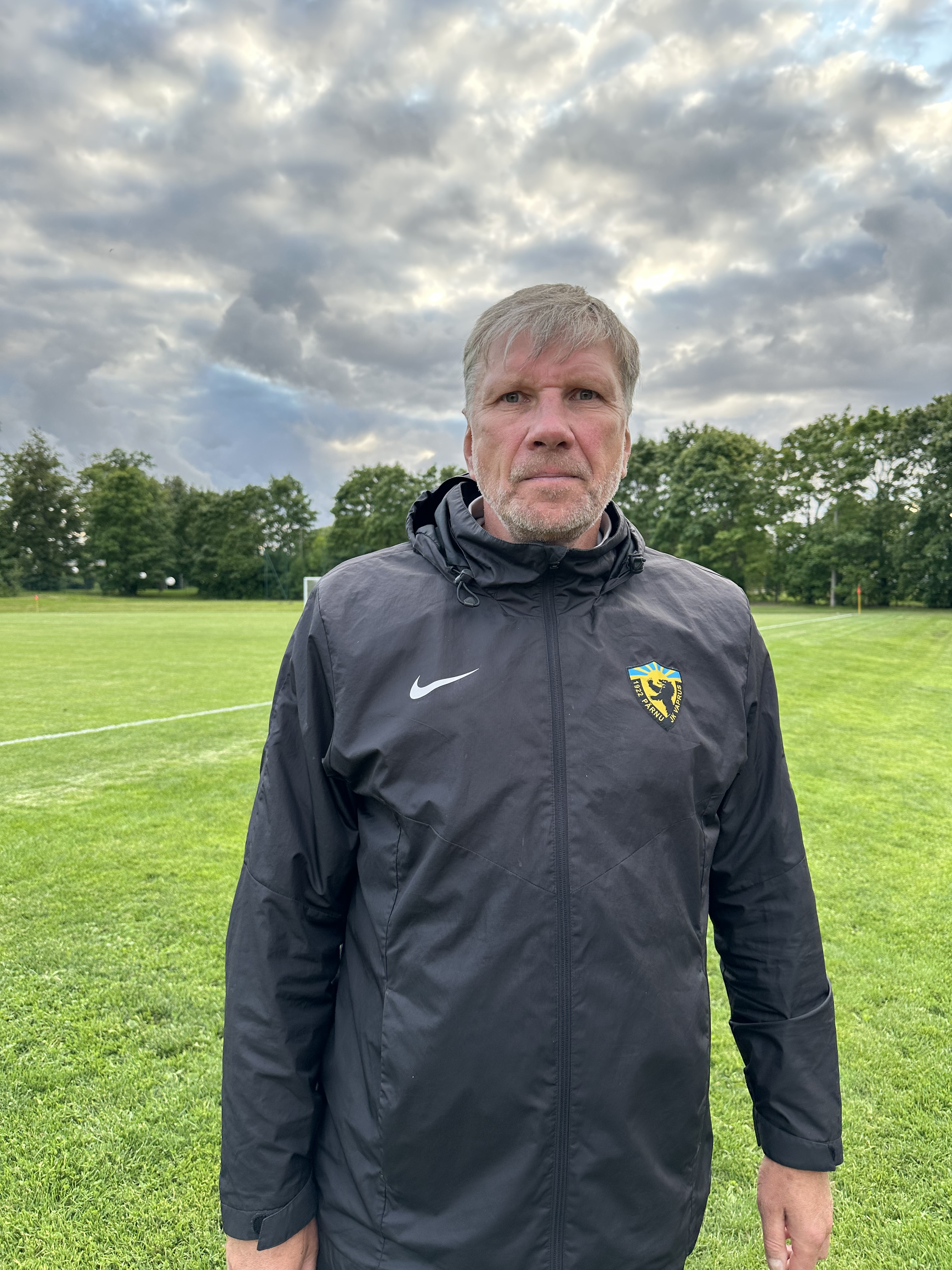

Personal information
- Full name: Igor Prins
- Date of birth: 21 October 1966 (age 60)
- Place of birth: Pärnu, then part of Estonian SSR, Soviet Union
- Position: Midfielder

Senior career*
Years	Team	Apps	(Gls)
1983	1. detsember	18	(2)
1983–1985	Pärnu Kalakombinaat/MEK	32	(2)
1984	Noorus	2	(0)
1985–1990	Sport	132	(1)
1986–1987	Zvezda	15	(0)
1989	Eesti Tööstus/Flora	1	(0)
1991	Norma	19	(4)
1992–1994	Flora	32	(0)
1994	Tevalte	17	(0)
1994–1996	Lantana-Marlekor	51	(0)
1997–1998	Tallinna Sadam	41	(2)
1999–2003	Levadia	79	(1)
2001	Pärnu Levadia	3	(0)
2003	M.C. Tallinn	2	(1)
2004	Levadia II	23	(1)
2006–2007	Nõmme Kalju II	22	(1)
2007	Nõmme Kalju	1	(1)
2008–2011	Toompea 1994	64	(6)
Total		554	(22)

International career
1992–1994	Estonia	20	(0)

Managerial career
- 2003–2007: Levadia (assistant)
- 2008–2010: Levadia
- 2010–2014: Nõmme Kalju
- 2016–2017: Levadia
- 2017–2022: Pärnu JK
- 2022–: Vaprus
- * Club domestic league appearances and goals

Igor Prins (born 21 October 1966) is an Estonian football manager and former professional player.

== International career ==
Prins made his international debut for the Estonia national team on 3 June 1992 in a historic 1–1 draw against Slovenia in a friendly. The match was Estonia's first official match since restoration of independence and Slovenia's first match ever. Prins made a total of 20 appearances for the team.

== Honours ==
=== Player ===
Pärnu Kalakombinaat/MEK

- Estonian SSR Championship: 1985

Zvezda

- Estonian SSR Championship: 1986

Lantana

- Meistriliiga: 1995–96

Levadia

- Meistriliiga: 1999, 2000
- Estonian Cup: 1998–99, 1999–2000

=== Manager ===
Levadia

- Meistriliiga: 2008, 2009

Nõmme Kalju

- Meistriliiga: 2012

Individual

- Meistriliiga Manager of the Month: April 2012, July 2012, September 2012, September 2013, April 2014, September 2014, September 2016, March 2017, September 2017, March 2023, August 2025
