= 2011 Meistriliiga =

Estonian national championships in football

Meistriliiga
- Season: 2011
- Champions: Flora; 9th title
- Relegated: Ajax
- Champions League: Flora
- Europa League: Nõmme Kalju; Narva Trans; Levadia
- Baltic League: Flora; Nõmme Kalju; Narva Trans; Levadia; Sillamäe Kalev
- Matches: 180
- Goals: 615 (3.42 per match)
- Top goalscorer: Aleksandrs Čekulajevs (46 goals)
- Biggest home win: Narva Trans 14–0 Ajax
- Biggest away win: Ajax 0–12 Narva Trans
- Highest scoring: Flora 13–1 Ajax; Narva Trans 14–0 Ajax
- Longest winning run: Nõmme Kalju (9 games)
- Longest unbeaten run: Flora (21 games)
- Longest winless run: Ajax (36 games)
- Longest losing run: Ajax (11 games)

The 2011 Meistriliiga was the 21st season of the Meistriliiga, the top Estonian league for association football clubs, since its establishment in 1992. The season began on 5 March 2011 and concluded on 5 November 2011. The defending champions Flora won their ninth league title.

== Teams ==
Lootus finished the 2010 season in last place and were relegated to the 2011 Esiliiga as a result, ending their one-year stay in the Estonian top flight. Taking their place were Ajax, who finished the 2010 Esiliiga first among promotion-eligible clubs and third overall. They returned to the top flight after a three-year absence.

Tulevik terminated their affiliation with Flora and continued as an independent club in the II Liiga. FC Viljandi was created to ensure top-level football would remain in the city of Viljandi.

In addition, the 9th place Meistriliiga club, Kuressaare, faced the 4th placed Esiliiga club, Kiviõli Tamme Auto in a two-legged play-off for a place in the Meistriliiga. Kuressaare won the play-off, 4–2 on aggregate, and thus retained their place in the league.

=== Stadiums and locations ===
Locations of the 2011 Meistriliiga teams

Team	Location	Stadium	Capacity	Manager
Ajax	Tallinn	Ajax Stadium	500	(Estonia) Boriss Dugan
Flora	Tallinn	A. Le Coq Arena	9,692	(Estonia) Martin Reim
Kuressaare	Kuressaare	Kuressaare linnastaadion	1,000	(Estonia) Sergei Zamogilnõi
Levadia	Tallinn	Kadriorg Stadium	1,300	(Estonia) Sergei Hohlov-Simson
Narva Trans	Narva	Narva Kreenholm Stadium	1,065	(Russia) Aleksei Yagudin
Nõmme Kalju	Tallinn	Hiiu Stadium	300	(Estonia) Igor Prins
Paide Linnameeskond	Paide	Paide linnastaadion	500	(Estonia) Meelis Rooba
Sillamäe Kalev	Sillamäe	Sillamäe Kalev Stadium	800	(Russia) Vladimir Kazachyonok
Tammeka	Tartu	Tartu Tamme Stadium	1,500	(Estonia) Kristjan Tiirik
Viljandi	Viljandi	Viljandi linnastaadion	384	(Estonia) Zaur Tšilingarašvili

== League table ==
Pos	Team	Pld	W	D	L	GF	GA	GD	Pts	Qualification or relegation
1	Flora (C)	36	26	8	2	100	24	+76	86	Qualification for Champions League second qualifying round
2	Nõmme Kalju	36	24	7	5	82	23	+59	79	Qualification for Europa League first qualifying round (Note: The winners of the 2011–12 Estonian Cup competition (Levadia) will qualify for the first qualifying round of UEFA Europa League.)
3	Narva Trans	36	22	7	7	107	29	+78	73	Qualification for Europa League first qualifying round
4	Levadia	36	21	10	5	76	25	+51	73	Qualification for Europa League first qualifying round
5	Sillamäe Kalev	36	17	3	16	77	59	+18	54	
6	Paide	36	13	6	17	40	51	−11	45	
7	Tammeka	36	11	6	19	57	75	−18	39	
8	Viljandi	36	8	6	22	37	69	−32	30	
9	Kuressaare (O)	36	7	5	24	28	68	−40	26	Qualification for relegation play-offs
10	Ajax (R)	36	0	4	32	11	192	−181	4	Relegation to Esiliiga

Source: Estonian Football Association (in Estonian)
Rules for classification: 1st - points; 2nd - fewest withdrawals or annulled matches; 3rd - overall wins; 4th - head-to-head points; 5th - head-to-head goal difference; 6th - goal difference; 7th - goals scored.
If two or more teams on the top have the same number of points by the end of the season, the aforementioned rules will not apply and additional game(s) will be played to determine the champions
(C) Champions; (O) Play-off winners; (R) Relegated

== Results ==
Each team played every opponent four times, twice at home and twice away, for a total of 36 games.

=== First half of season ===
Home \ Away	AJA	FLO	KUR	LEV	NAR	NÕM	PLM	SIL	TAM	VIL
Ajax		0–3	2–2	1–4	0–7	0–3	1–2	1–5	0–3	0–0
Flora	6–0		3–0	0–1	3–0	3–3	2–1	2–2	1–0	0–0
Kuressaare	1–1	0–1		1–5	0–2	0–1	1–0	0–1	4–1	0–2
Levadia	3–0	1–1	2–1		2–1	1–3	0–1	4–1	2–2	2–1
Narva Trans	7–0	0–2	4–0	1–1		1–3	3–0	1–0	4–1	5–0
Nõmme Kalju	4–0	0–1	1–1	1–1	1–1		0–0	1–2	4–0	3–0
Paide	1–0	1–2	4–1	0–0	0–1	0–3		1–0	2–2	2–1
Sillamäe Kalev	7–0	0–1	1–1	1–2	0–3	1–1	2–0		2–3	2–0
Tammeka	5–0	0–0	2–1	0–5	1–1	2–3	2–2	1–4		1–1
Viljandi	3–1	0–2	2–0	0–1	0–0	0–3	1–0	2–3	1–2	

Source: Estonian Football Association
Legend: Blue = home team win; Yellow = draw; Red = away team win.

=== Second half of season ===
Home \ Away	AJA	FLO	KUR	LEV	NAR	NÕM	PLM	SIL	TAM	VIL
Ajax		0–11	3–5	0–7	0–12	0–7	0–6	0–7	0–3	0–4
Flora	13–1		2–1	3–0	1–1	1–0	2–1	4–0	3–2	4–0
Kuressaare	0–0	0–3		0–0 (Note: The original score was 0–2, but was awarded 0–X to Kuressaare as Levadia used a suspended player.)	0–2	0–2	2–1	1–2	0–2	3–0
Levadia	6–0	1–1	4–0		1–1	0–1	0–0	3–2	3–0	2–0
Narva Trans	14–0	1–1	4–0	0–2		3–2	3–0	2–3	4–0	5–0
Nõmme Kalju	3–0	3–0	3–0	1–1	1–0		1–2	3–0	3–1	2–1
Paide	4–0	1–4	1–0	0–3	0–1	0–5		0–1	2–1	2–0
Sillamäe Kalev	7–0	0–6	3–0	0–2	2–5	0–3	4–0		5–1	5–0
Tammeka	9–0	1–4	1–0	0–4	1–4	0–1	1–2	2–0		1–3
Viljandi	8–0	2–4	0–2	0–0	1–3	0–3	1–1	3–2	0–3	

Source: Estonian Football Association
Legend: Blue = home team win; Yellow = draw; Red = away team win.

=== Relegation play-off ===
At season's end, the 9th place club in the Meistriliiga participated in a two-legged playoff with the runners-up of the 2011 Esiliiga for one place in the following year's competition.

13 November 2011	Infonet	0–1	Kuressaare	Tallinn
13:00 EET (GMT+2)		Report	Borissov 2' (o.g.)	Stadium: Lasnamäe KJH artificial turf Attendance: 187; Referee: Jaan Roos

19 November 2011	Kuressaare	4–1	Infonet	Kuressaare
13:00 EET (GMT+2)	Pukk 41'; Valmas 60'; Viira 85'; Pajunurm 87'	Report	Timofejev 61'	Stadium: Kuressaare linnastaadion Attendance: 135; Referee: Eiko Saar

Kuressaare retained their place in the league, winning 5–1 on aggregate.

== Season statistics ==
=== Top scorers ===
Rank	Player	Club	Goals
1	(Latvia) Aleksandrs Čekulajevs	Narva Trans	46
2	(Estonia) Tarmo Neemelo	Nõmme Kalju	22
2	(Estonia) Albert Prosa	Tammeka	22
4	(Estonia) Henri Anier	Flora	21
5	(Estonia) Vitali Leitan	Levadia	20
6	(Estonia) Maksim Gruznov	Narva Trans	17
7	(Estonia) Jüri Jevdokimov	Nõmme Kalju	16
7	(Estonia) Kristen Viikmäe	Nõmme Kalju	16
9	(Russia) Aleksei Alekseev	Sillamäe Kalev	14
9	(Russia) Aleksandr Nikulin	Sillamäe Kalev	14

=== Average attendance ===
Club	Average attendance
Nõmme JK Kalju	515
Tartu JK Tammeka	307
Tallinna FC Flora	274
JK Sillamäe Kalev	177
FC Kuressaare	154
Tallinna FC Levadia	150
Paide Linnameeskond	142
JK Narva Trans	128
FC Viljandi	106
Lasnamäe FC Ajax	79
League average	203

== Awards ==
=== Monthly awards ===
Month	Manager of the Month		Player of the Month	
Month	Manager	Club	Player	Club
March	(Estonia) Martin Reim	Flora	(Lithuania) Marius Bezykornovas	Narva Trans
April	(Estonia) Aleksandr Puštov	Levadia	(Estonia) Sergei Mošnikov	Flora
May	(Estonia) Sergei Zamogilnõi	Kuressaare	(Estonia) Gert Kams	Flora
June	(Estonia) Igor Prins	Nõmme Kalju	(Latvia) Aleksandrs Čekulajevs	Narva Trans
July	(Estonia) Igor Prins	Nõmme Kalju	(Estonia) Vitali Leitan	Levadia
August	(Estonia) Igor Prins	Nõmme Kalju	(Japan) Hidetoshi Wakui	Nõmme Kalju
September	(Estonia) Martin Reim	Flora	(Latvia) Aleksandrs Čekulajevs	Narva Trans
October	(Estonia) Meelis Rooba	Paide Linnameeskond	(Estonia) Markus Jürgenson	Flora

=== Meistriliiga Player of the Year ===
Sergei Mošnikov was named Meistriliiga Player of the Year.

== See also ==
- 2010–11 Estonian Cup
- 2011–12 Estonian Cup
- 2011 Esiliiga
