= Vladislav Ivanov (footballer, born 1986) =

Russian footballer (born 1986)

Personal information
- Full name: Vladislav Aleksandrovich Ivanov
- Date of birth: January 24, 1986 (age 40)
- Place of birth: Narva, Estonian SSR, Soviet Union
- Height: 1.86 m (6 ft 1 in)
- Positions: Attacking midfielder; forward

Senior career*
Years	Team	Apps	(Gls)
2003	Narva Trans	9	(1)
2004–2005	Tartu Merkuur	46	(10)
2006–2009	Narva Trans	88	(26)
2008	→ Karpaty Lviv (loan)	0	(0)
2009–2010	Levadia Tallinn	28	(11)
2010–2011	Asteras Tripolis	0	(0)
2011	→ Ilioupoli F.C. (loan)	6	(0)
2011	Torpedo Moscow	3	(0)
2012	Sillamäe Kalev	17	(10)
2012	Narva Trans	17	(13)
2013	Luch-Energiya	10	(1)
2013	Khimik Dzerzhinsk	18	(0)
2014	Levadia Tallinn	21	(19)
2015	Mash'al Mubarek	12	(5)
2015	Infonet	15	(5)
2016	Narva Trans	16	(0)
2016	Kohtla-Järve JK Järve		
2019	JK Narva Trans II		
2020	FC Tallinn		
- * Club domestic league appearances and goals

Vladislav Ivanov (Russian: Владислав Александрович Иванов; born 24 January 1986) is a Russian former professional footballer. He played the position of midfielder and forward.

== Career ==
On 1 March 2012 Ivanov joined JK Sillamäe Kalev and instantly became a key player for the team, leading Meistriliiga's top scorers list with six goals in nine matches. His stay at Sillamäe was cut short when his contract was terminated by the club on 9 May 2012 due to disciplinary reasons. Surprisingly, Ivanov featured in Kalev's next match only a few days later, when he was substituted in at the end of the first half. The player said that the initial decision was made hastily and both he and the club agreed to continue working together on a short-term deal.

Ivanov took part of a friendly between JK Narva Trans and FC Zenit Saint Petersburg on 25 July 2012 and rejoined his old club in Narva on 30 July 2012. Although both teams, he played for in 2012, finished outside the podium, he was the top scorer of the competition with 23 goals.

== Honours ==
=== Club ===
Narva Trans

- Meistriliiga runners-up (1): 2006
- Estonian Supercup (1): 2007

Levadia Tallinn

- Meistriliiga (1): 2009
- Meistriliiga runners-up (1): 2010
- Estonian Cup (1): 2009–10
- Estonian Supercup (1): 2010

Luch-Energiya Vladivostok

- Russian Second Division, East zone (1): 2012–13

=== Individual ===
- Meistriliiga Top Scorer: 2012 (23 goals)
