= Joti Stamatopoulos =

German football manager (born 1972)

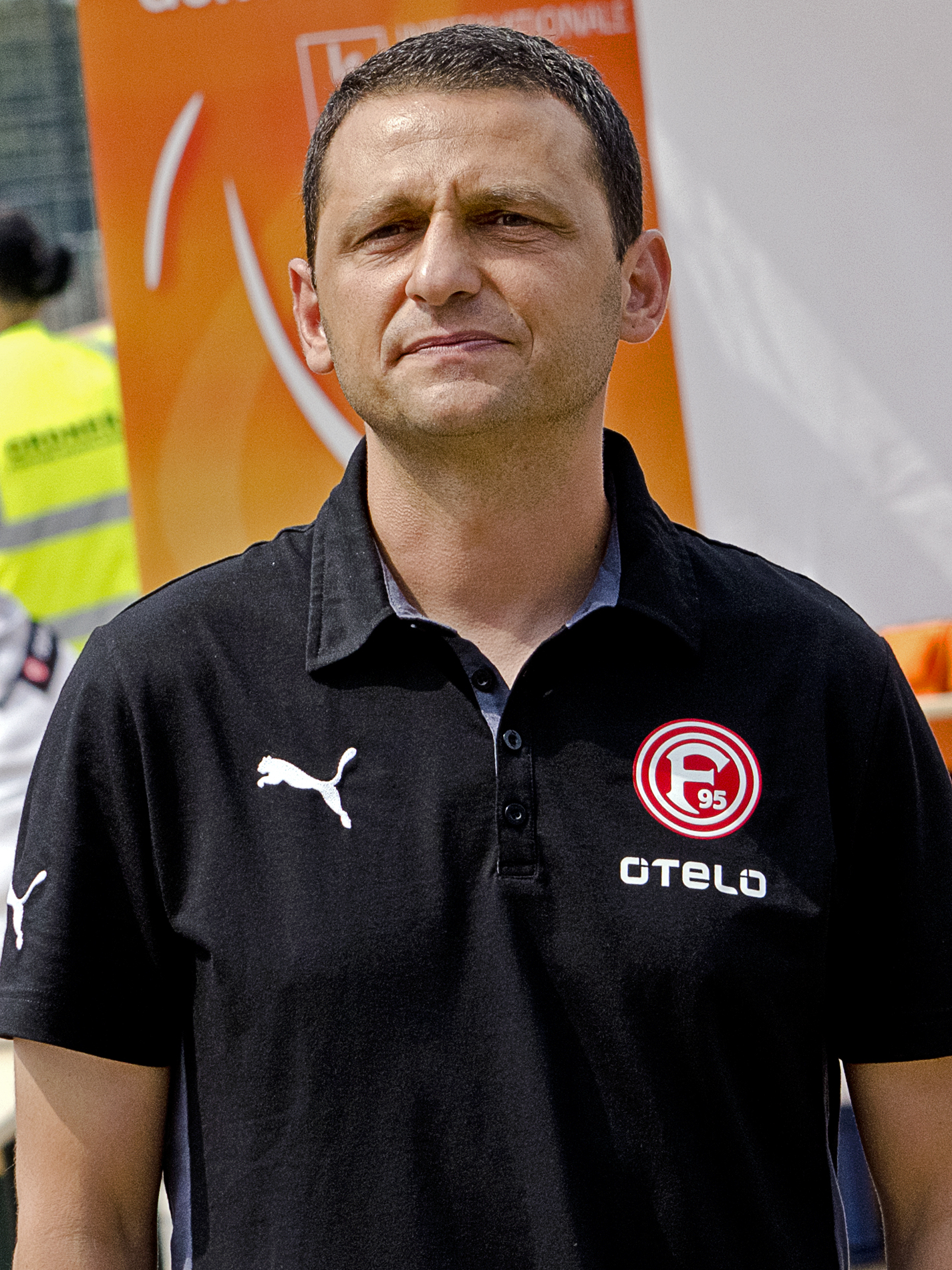
- Stamatopoulos 2014

Personal information
- Full name: Panagiotis Stamatopoulos
- Date of birth: 10 December 1972 (age 53)
- Place of birth: Germany

Managerial career
- Years: Team
- 2001–2003: SC West Köln
- 2003–2006: SF Troisdorf
- 2008–2009: Panionios FC
- 2010–2011: Pontioi Katerini FC
- 2012: Tyrnavos 2005 FC
- 2012: Tartu JK Tammeka
- 2012–2013: Episkopi FC
- 2021: FC 08 Homburg

Joti Stamatopoulos (Greek: Γιώτης Σταματόπουλος; born 10 December 1972) is a German football manager and former player who was last assistant manager of Antalyaspor.

== Early life ==
Stamatopoulos is a native of Cologne, Germany. He retired from playing football at the age of twenty-eight after suffering a knee injury.

== Career ==
Stamatopoulos started his managerial career with German side SC West Köln. In 2003, he was appointed manager of German side SF Troisdorf. In 2008, he was appointed manager of Greek side Panionios FC. In 2010, he was appointed manager of Greek side Pontioi Katerini FC. In 2012, he was appointed manager of Greek side Tyrnavos 2005 FC. After that, he was appointed manager of Estonian side Tartu JK Tammeka. After that, he was appointed manager of Greek side Episkopi FC. In 2021, he was appointed manager of German side FC 08 Homburg. He starred in German television show "Fujuma".

== Personal life ==
Stamatopoulos has been married. He has a son.
