= Nõmme Kalju FC =

Association football club in Estonia

Nõmme Kalju
- Full name: Nõmme Kalju FC
- Nickname: Roosad Pantrid (Pink Panthers)
- Founded: 1923; 103 years ago Re-established in 1997; 29 years ago
- Ground: Hiiu Stadium
- Capacity: 570
- President: Kuno Tehva
- Manager: Nikita Andreev
- League: Meistriliiga
- 2026: Meistriliiga, 4th of 10
- Website: www.jkkalju.ee
Home colours	Away colours

Nõmme Kalju FC (Estonian pronunciation: [ˈnɤmːe ˈkɑlju]), commonly known as Nõmme Kalju, or simply as Kalju (Estonian: "rock" or "cliff"), is a professional football club based in Nõmme, Tallinn, that competes in the Meistriliiga, the top flight of Estonian football. The club's home ground is Hiiu Stadium.

Founded in 1923, Nõmme Kalju first played in the Estonian top division from 1925 until 1927, but were dissolved in 1944 due to the Soviet occupation of Estonia. Re-established in 1997, the club has played in the Meistriliiga since the 2008 season and have not been relegated since. Kalju have won two Meistriliiga titles (2012 and 2018), two Estonian Cups (2014–15 and 2024–25), and two Estonian Supercups (2019 and 2026).

== History ==
=== Founding and re-establishment (1923–2007) ===
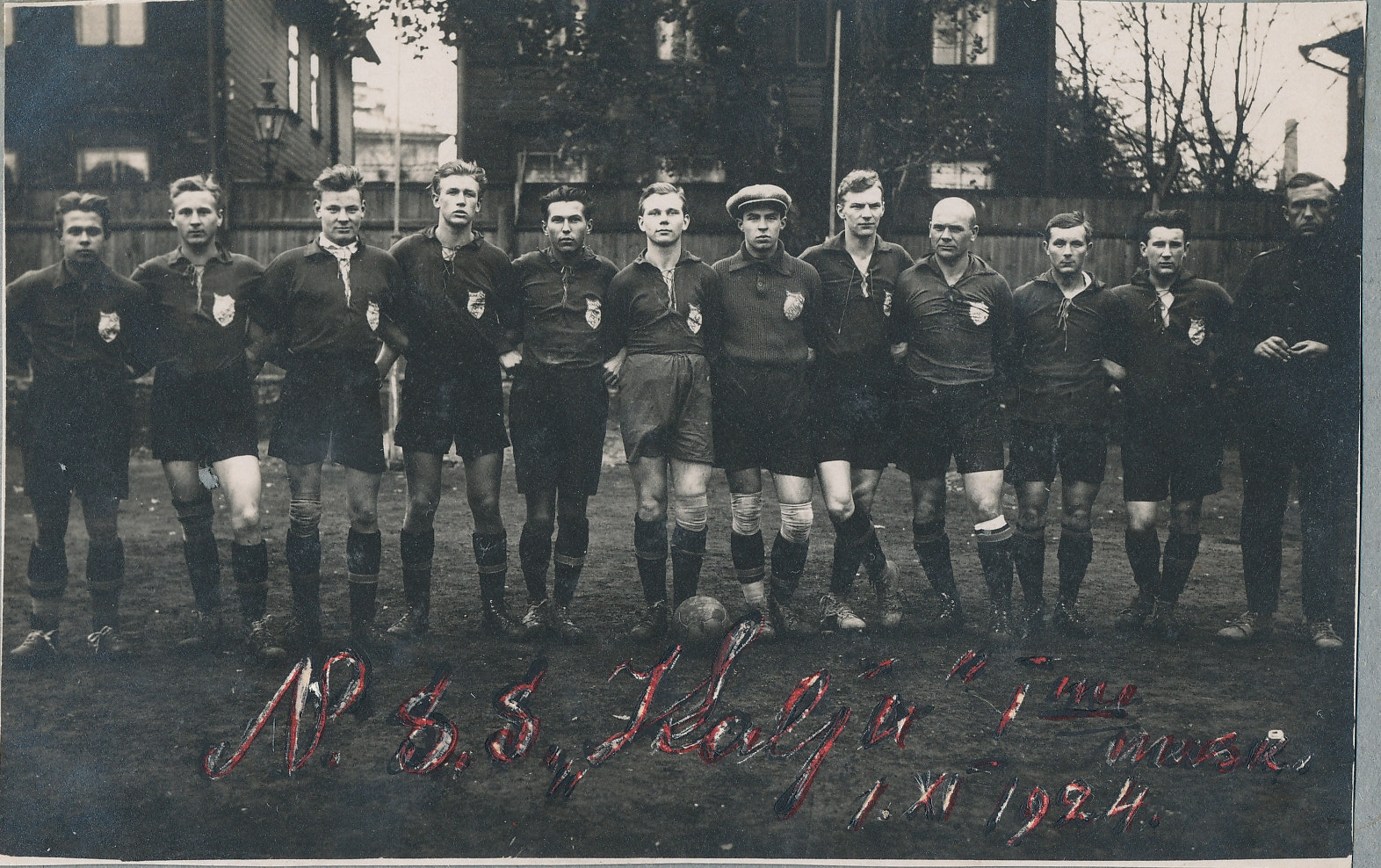
Nõmme Kalju footballers in 1924

Nõmme Kalju football club was founded in 1923 as a division of the Kalju Sports Club by two professional wrestlers, Aleksander Šneider and Mart Liiv. Kalju debuted in the Estonian top division in 1925, finishing fifth, and remained in the championship until 1927. In 1936, the club opened Hiiu Stadium. Nõmme Kalju was first closed down in 1940 after the Soviet Union occupied Estonia, but was re-established a year later during the German occupation. The club was dissolved again in 1944 after Soviet Union retook Estonia and Kalju's club building was destroyed by the first Soviet tank that had reached Nõmme.

The club was re-established in 1997 by the former Estonia national team manager Uno Piir, Anton Siht and Värner Lootsmann. Nõmme Kalju joined the Estonian football league system and began competing in the Northern division of the III liiga. The club finished their first season in second place, while Joel Lindpere was the top goalscorer with 13 goals. Nõmme Kalju played in the III liiga for eight consecutive seasons.

In 2002, Kuno Tehva acquired the club with a goal of establishing a professional football club. Nõmme Kalju were promoted to the third tier II liiga in 2004 and to the second tier Esiliiga in 2005. Nõmme Kalju finished their first season in the Esiliiga in fifth place. In 2007, Getúlio Fredo was appointed as manager. Nõmme Kalju finished the 2007 season in sixth place and faced Kuressaare in the promotion play-offs. The club lost their first match home 0–1 but won the second leg away 2–1 and advanced to the Meistriliiga on away goals.

=== First league title (2008–2012) ===
In preparation for their Meistriliiga debut, Nõmme Kalju rebuilt the team by signing 16 new players. Nõmme Kalju finished their first season in the Meistriliiga in fourth place, only a point away from the third place, while Ingemar Teever won the top goalscorer's title with 23 goals. In 2009, the club also made its debut in Europe by playing in the 2009–10 UEFA Europa League, where they were defeated by Dinaburg 1–2 on aggregate in the first qualifying round. Nõmme Kalju finished the 2009 season in fifth place. In 2010, Igor Prins took over as manager and Nõmme Kalju finished the 2010 season in fourth place. The club strengthened their first-team squad significantly during the 2010–11 winter transfer window by signing Estonian internationals Alo Bärengrub, Tarmo Neemelo, Eino Puri and Kristen Viikmäe. Nõmme Kalju finished the 2011 season as runners-up, seven points behind champions Flora, while Tarmo Neemelo scored 22 goals. In the 2012 season, Nõmme Kalju won their first league title, amassing 92 points.

=== Cup success and second league title (2013–2019) ===
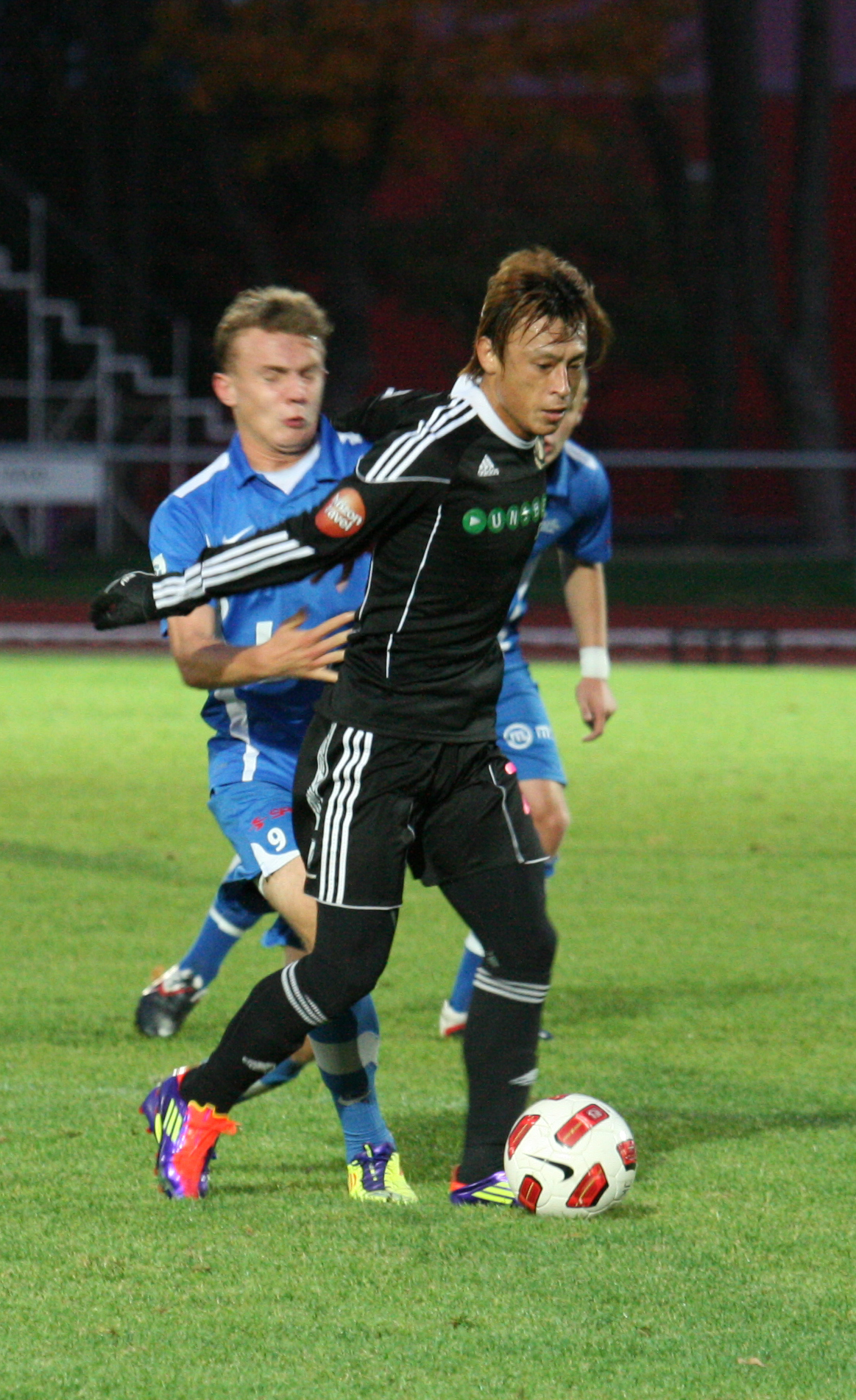
Hidetoshi Wakui is Kalju's all-time top foreign goalscorer, with 74 goals (2011–2016)

By winning the Meistriliiga, Nõmme Kalju also qualified to the 2013–14 UEFA Champions League qualifying phase. Nõmme Kalju defeated HJK in the second qualifying round 2–1 on aggregate, but subsequently lost to Viktoria Plzeň 2–10 on aggregate in the third qualifying round. The team failed to defend their Meistriliiga title in the 2013 season, finishing as runners-up, despite Vladimir Voskoboinikov winning the goalscoring title with 23 goals. Nõmme Kalju finished the 2014 season with a disappointing fourth place, following which Igor Prins was sacked and replaced by former player Sergei Terehhov. Under Terehhov, the team had a successful start, winning first nine league games and winning their first Estonian Cup trophy, defeating Paide Linnameeskond 2–0 in the final. In September 2015, Terehhov resigned after poor results in the Meistriliiga, with Getúlio Fredo taking over as caretaker manager. Nõmme Kalju finished the 2015 season in third place.

Nõmme Kalju appointed Sergei Frantsev as head coach in November 2015. Under Frantsev, the team finished third in 2016 and 2017, before winning the Meistriliiga for the second time in 2018 without losing a single match, amassing 86 points in 36 matches. In March 2019, Kalju lifted their first Estonian Supercup by defeating Levadia 3–2. Less than two months later, on 25 April 2019, Frantsev was sacked after a poor start to the 2019 league season, with Roman Kozhukhovskyi taking over and guiding the team to a third place finish.

=== Recent history (2020–present) ===
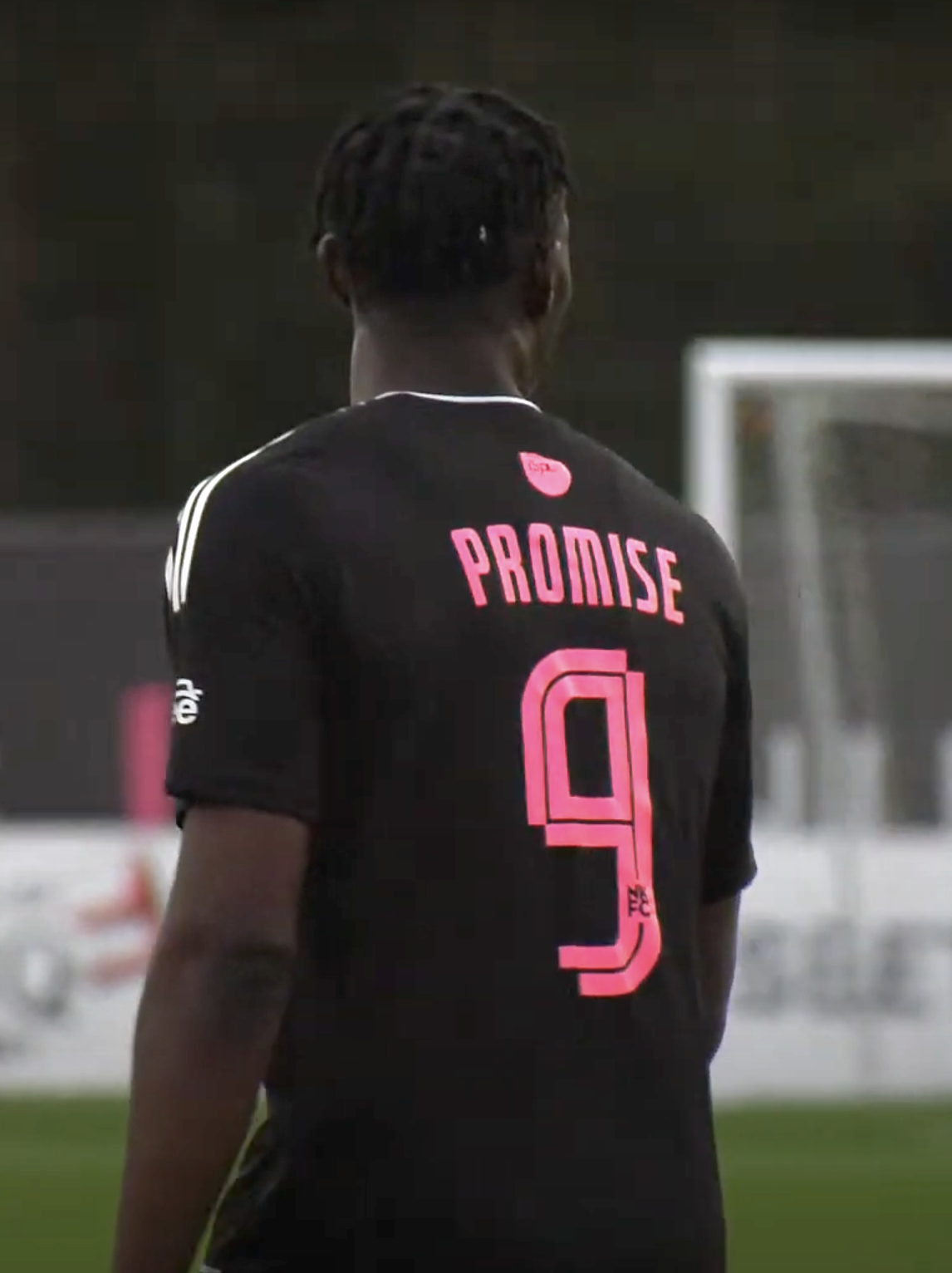
Promise David is Nõmme Kalju's record sale.

Nõmme Kalju finished the 2020 season in fourth place under head coach Marko Kristal. After the season, Kalju were forced to move away from their home ground Hiiu Stadium due to planned renovation, ultimately resulting in Kalju having to play their home matches across different stadiums in Tallinn throughout the next four seasons, as the construction project was delayed for nearly three years. The club brought back their 2018 title-winning coach Sergei Frantsev for the 2021 season, but dismissed him at the end of the year following another fourth place finish. Kalju reached the 2021–22 Estonian Cup final, but lost 0–1 to Paide. For the third consecutive year, Kalju finished the 2022 league season in fourth place, before finishing 5th in 2023, their first outside of the top four finish since 2009.

Kalju returned to Hiiu Stadium in May 2024 and finished the 2024 season in second place, with Alex Matthias Tamm winning the league's top scorer award with 28 goals. The club lost the 2025 Supercup final to Levadia, but defeated the same opponent on penalties three months later to lift the 2024–25 Estonian Cup. Kalju lifted their second Supercup trophy in February 2026 by defeating Flora 3–1.

== Crest and colours ==
The original club crest was most likely created in 1922, when the Kalju Sports Club was founded, although the author of crest remains unknown. The crest was remade by artist Martin Lazarev, who preserved all the historical elements, but gave the crest a finished shape and form.

Nõmme Kalju's uniforms have traditionally been black and white. In the 2000s, Nõmme Kalju also adopted the colour of pink, leading to the nickname Pink Panthers.

Alternative versions of the Kalju crest

2016–2017

2018–2023

Earliest crest

–2017

2018–2023

2024–

== Kit manufacturers and shirt sponsors ==
Period	Kit manufacturer	Shirt sponsor	Ref
2008–2011	Adidas	Unibet	
2012–2013	Adidas	help.ee	
2014–2016	Adidas	Optibet	
2017–2019	Adidas	help.ee	
2020	Adidas	Paf	
2021–2022	Adidas	Rämmar	
2023–2025	Adidas	Marsbet	
2026–	Macron		

== Stadium ==
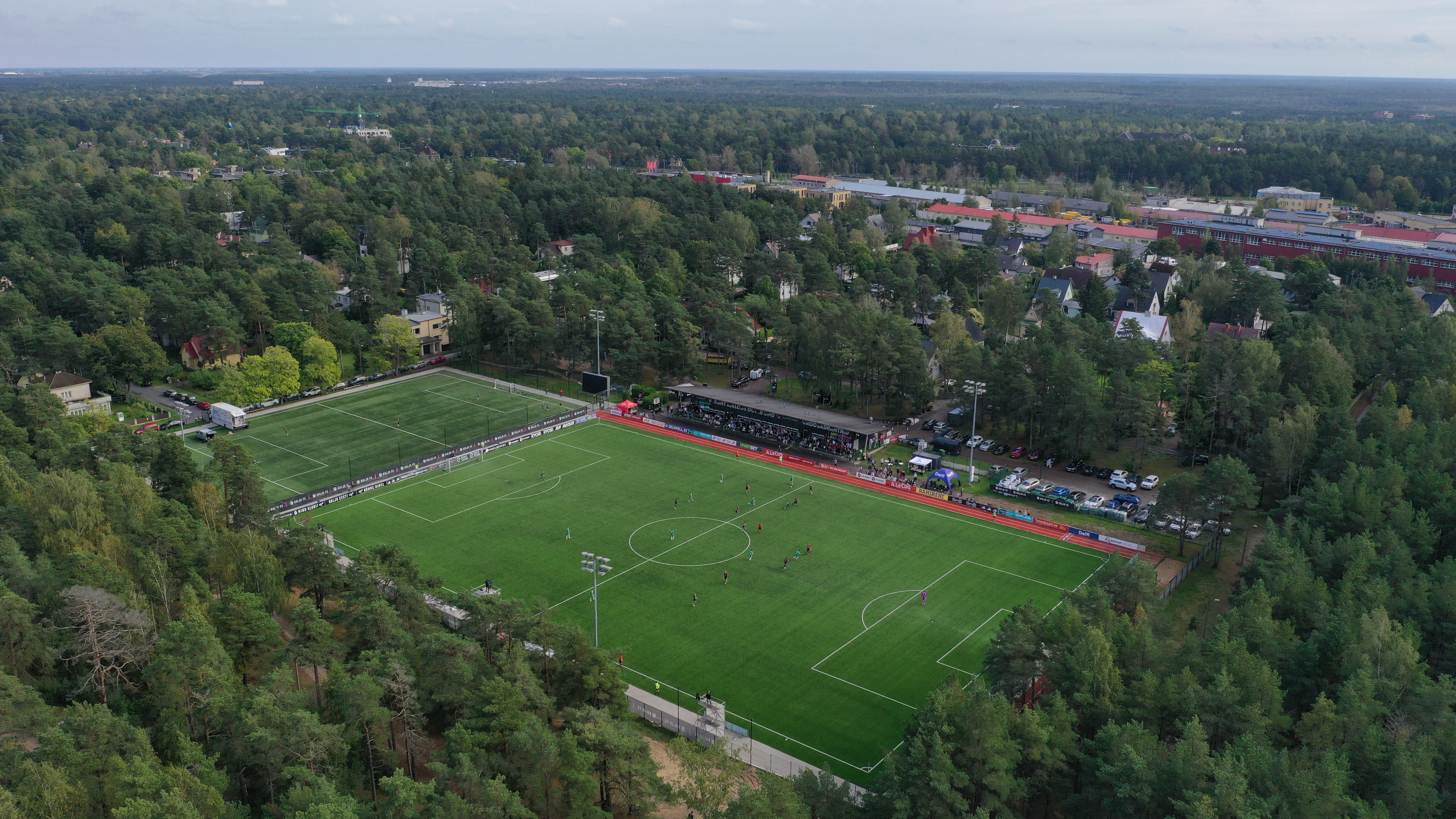
Hiiu Stadium has been the home ground of Nõmme Kalju since 1936

Hiiu Stadium has been the traditional home ground of Nõmme Kalju since its opening in 1936 until the club's dissolution in 1944 due to the Soviet occupation of Estonia, and again since the club's re-establishment in 1997. The construction of the stadium was carried out largely by Nõmme Kalju footballers themselves in the 1930s. Located approximately 8 km southwest of the Tallinn city centre and in the district of Nõmme, it has an artificial turf surface and has undergone several renovation periods, most recently in 2023–2024.

From 2012 to 2014, and for home European matches, Nõmme Kalju played at the larger Kadriorg Stadium. Located 10 km from Nõmme, in Kadriorg, the stadium was opened in 1926 and is one of the oldest football stadiums in Estonia. With a capacity of over 5,000, Kadriorg could seat 10 times as many spectators as the Hiiu Stadium.

== Rivalries ==
=== Kalju–Flora rivalry ===
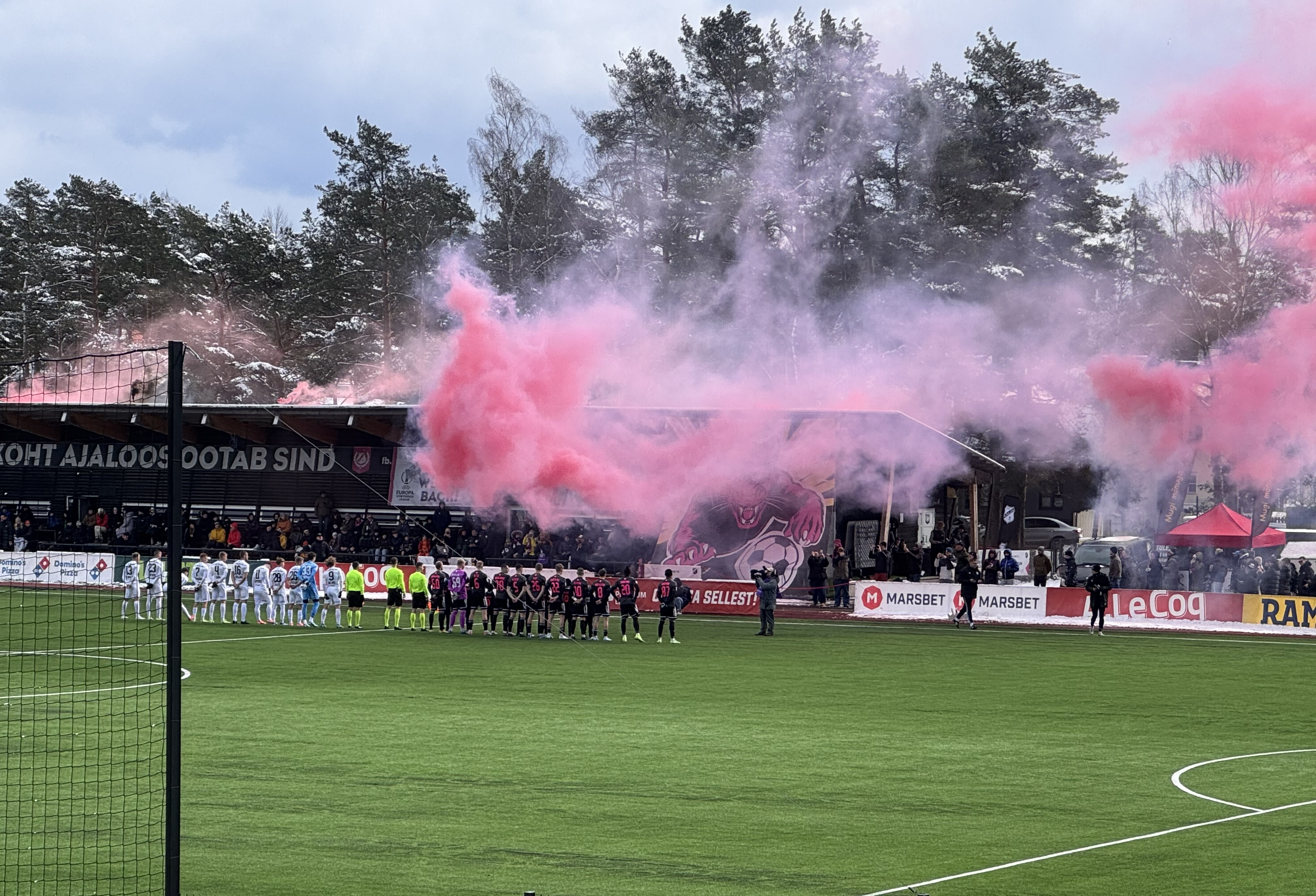
Kalju and Flora players lining up in front of Kalju's "Pink Panthers" fan group

Nõmme Kalju's deepest rivalry is with FC Flora and the fixture is known as raudteederbi (English: The Railway Derby). The name derives from the fact that the stadiums of the two clubs are connected via a railway. The rivalry emerged in the early 2010s, when Kalju started challenging Flora in terms of on-field success, as well as in fan popularity. Throughout the years, the rivalry has also intensified due to an enmity between Kalju's president Kuno Tehva and Flora's founder Aivar Pohlak. Flora's signing of Kalju's homegrown players Henrik Pürg and Vlasiy Sinyavskiy in 2018 caused a further strife in the relationship of the two clubs, as Nõmme Kalju claimed Flora had approached the players before the start of the allowed six month pre-contract agreement period. Since then, no transfer deals have taken place between the two clubs. The fixture's attendance record of 3,521 was set in the 2013 Estonian Cup final.

=== Nõmme Derby ===
Nõmme Kalju has a local rivalry with FC Nõmme United, as both clubs are based in the Nõmme district of Tallinn. Their home grounds Hiiu Stadium and Männiku Stadium are located approximately 3 km apart. For the first decades, the rivalry only existed in youth football, until Nõmme United’s promotion to the Estonian top division saw the clubs face each other for the first time on 17 March 2024. The second-ever Nõmme Derby saw the second-fastest goal in Meistriliiga history, as Promise David opened the score for Nõmme Kalju after just 7 seconds.

== Players ==
=== First-team squad ===
As of 1 September 2026.

Note: Flags indicate national team as defined under FIFA eligibility rules; some limited exceptions apply. Players may hold more than one non-FIFA nationality.

No.	Pos.	Nation	Player
1	GK	EST	Henri Perk (captain)
2	DF	EST	Johannes Lillemets
4	DF	EST	Alex Boronilštšikov
5	DF	EST	Uku Kõrre
6	MF	EST	Kristjan Kask
7	DF	EST	Daniil Tarassenkov
8	MF	UKR	Oleksandr Musolitin
10	MF	EST	Nikita Ivanov
11	FW	EST	Mihhail Orlov
17	MF	GEQ	Enrique Esono
20	DF	SEN	Modou Tambedou
21	MF	POR	Tiago Baptista
22	DF	EST	Aleksandr Nikolajev

No.	Pos.	Nation	Player
26	MF	EST	Rommi Siht
27	FW	EST	Mattias Männilaan
30	FW	GHA	Ibrahim Jabir
46	DF	CRO	Roko Vukušić
50	DF	EST	Maksim Podholjuzin (vice-captain)
52	MF	POR	Idalécio Dias
59	MF	EST	Bogdan Vaštšuk
69	GK	RUS	Maksim Pavlov
74	DF	EST	Fjodor Jekimov
78	DF	UKR	Danyl Mashchenko
88	DF	EST	Daniil Sõtšugov
96	GK	EST	Joonas Kindel

== Club officials ==
=== Current technical staff ===
Position	Name
Head coach	(Russia) Nikita Andreev
Assistant coaches	(Estonia) Artjom Artjunin
Assistant coaches	(Estonia) Erik Šteinberg
Goalkeeping coach	(Poland) Piotr Ostrowski
Video analyst	(Ukraine) Maksym Kalenchuk
Physiotherapist	(Estonia) Marcus Suurväli
Management
President	(Estonia) Kuno Tehva
Chief Executive Officer	(Estonia) Ehte Eamets
Head of Youth	(Estonia) Igor Morozov

=== Managerial history ===
Dates	Name
1999–2004	(Estonia) Uno Piir
2007–2010	(Brazil) Getúlio Fredo
2010	(Estonia) Karel Voolaid
2010–2014	(Estonia) Igor Prins
2015	(Estonia) Sergei Terehhov
2015	(Brazil) Getúlio Fredo
2016–2019	(Russia) Sergey Frantsev
2019	(Ukraine) Roman Kozhukhovskyi
2020	(Estonia) Marko Kristal
2021	(Russia) Sergey Frantsev
2022	(Portugal) Eddie Cardoso
2022–2023	(Estonia) Kaido Koppel
2023–	(Russia) Nikita Andreev

== Honours ==
=== League ===
- Meistriliiga
  - Winners (2): 2012, 2018

=== Cups ===
- Estonian Cup
  - Winners (2): 2014–15, 2024–25
- Estonian Supercup
  - Winners (2): 2019, 2026

== Seasons and statistics ==
=== Seasons ===
Season	Division	Pos	Pld	W	D	L	GF	GA	GD	Pts	Top goalscorer	Cup	Supercup
1997–98	III liiga (N)	2	8	5	0	3	48	12	+36	15	(Estonia) Joel Lindpere (13)		
1998	III liiga (N)	2	10	7	2	1	40	15	+25	23	(Estonia) Karl Lepist (14)		
1999	III liiga (N)	3	20	12	2	6	53	24	+29	38	(Estonia) Lauri Kiviloo (21)		
2000	III liiga (N)	4	20	8	2	10	38	37	+1	26	(Estonia) Lauri Kiviloo (11)		
2001	III liiga (N)	5	18	7	3	8	36	56	−20	24	(Estonia) Lauri Kiviloo (15)		
2002	III liiga (N)	7	18	6	4	8	39	43	−4	22	(Estonia) Andreas Aniko (7)		
2003	III liiga (N)	4	18	10	3	5	37	20	+17	33	(Estonia) Toomas Krõm (7)		
2004	III liiga (N)	2	18	11	5	2	68	32	+36	38	(Estonia) Lauri Kiviloo (15)		
2005	II liiga (N/E)	1	28	18	5	5	88	36	+52	59	(Estonia) Andrus Mitt (28)		
2006	Esiliiga	5	36	18	5	13	76	80	−4	59	(Estonia) Andrus Mitt (35)	First round	
2007	Esiliiga	6	36	13	9	14	69	69	0	48	(Estonia) Andrus Mitt (24)	Third round	
2008	Meistriliiga	4	36	16	7	13	65	64	+1	55	(Estonia) Ingemar Teever (23)	Third round	
2009	Meistriliiga	5	36	15	9	12	65	47	+18	54	(Brazil) Felipe Nunes (20)	Runners-up	
2010	Meistriliiga	4	36	18	8	10	59	42	+17	62	(Estonia) Jüri Jevdokimov (21)	Quarter-finals	
2011	Meistriliiga	2	36	24	7	5	82	23	+59	79	(Estonia) Tarmo Neemelo (22)	Third round	
2012	Meistriliiga	1	36	29	5	2	106	17	+89	92	(Estonia) Tarmo Neemelo (22)	Second round	
2013	Meistriliiga	2	36	26	6	4	78	23	+55	84	(Estonia) Vladimir Voskoboinikov (23)	Runners-up	Runners-up
2014	Meistriliiga	4	36	24	6	6	85	19	+66	78	(Japan) Hidetoshi Wakui (21)	Third round	
2015	Meistriliiga	3	36	22	5	9	69	36	+33	71	(Estonia) Ats Purje (16)	Winners	
2016	Meistriliiga	3	36	22	9	5	70	28	+42	75	(Estonia) Ats Purje (14)	Quarter-finals	Runners-up
2017	Meistriliiga	3	36	24	6	6	101	32	+69	78	(Brazil) Liliu (16)	Quarter-finals	
2018	Meistriliiga	1	36	25	11	0	114	32	+82	86	(Brazil) Liliu (31)	Quarter-finals	
2019	Meistriliiga	3	36	22	11	3	79	34	+45	77	(New Zealand) Max Mata (Brazil) Liliu (Estonia) Igor Subbotin (9)	Runners-up	Winners
2020	Meistriliiga	4	30	14	7	9	52	31	+21	49	(Ukraine) Vladyslav Khomutov (Estonia) Aleksandr Volkov (9)	Quarter-finals	
2021	Meistriliiga	4	32	13	6	13	57	44	+13	45	(Estonia) Pavel Marin (9)	Quarter-finals	
2022	Meistriliiga	4	36	19	8	9	59	30	+29	65	(Estonia) Alex Matthias Tamm (12)	Runners-up	
2023	Meistriliiga	5	36	12	13	11	50	42	+8	49	(Estonia) Alex Matthias Tamm (Canada) Promise David (7)	Fourth round	
2024	Meistriliiga	2	36	21	9	6	79	44	+35	72	(Estonia) Alex Matthias Tamm (28)	Semi-finals	
2025	Meistriliiga	3	36	23	5	8	69	37	+32	74	(Estonia) Kristjan Kask (Estonia) Rommi Siht (9)	Winners	Runners-up

=== Europe ===
Season	Competition	Round	Opponent	Home	Away	Agg.
2009–10	UEFA Europa League	First qualifying round	(Latvia) Dinaburg	0–0	1–2	1–2
2011–12	UEFA Europa League	First qualifying round	(Finland) Honka	0–2	0–0	0–2
2012–13	UEFA Europa League	First qualifying round	(Azerbaijan) Khazar Lankaran	0–2	2–2	2–4
2013–14	UEFA Champions League	Second qualifying round	(Finland) HJK	2–1	0–0	2–1
2013–14	UEFA Champions League	Third qualifying round	(Czech Republic) Viktoria Plzeň	0–4	2–6	2–10
2013–14	UEFA Europa League	Play-off round	(Ukraine) Dnipro Dnipropetrovsk	1–3	0–2	1–5
2014–15	UEFA Europa League	First qualifying round	(Iceland) Fram	2–2	1–0	3–2
2014–15	UEFA Europa League	Second qualifying round	(Poland) Lech Poznań	1–0	0–3	1–3
2015–16	UEFA Europa League	First qualifying round	(Kazakhstan) Aktobe	0–0	1–0	1–0
2015–16	UEFA Europa League	Second qualifying round	(Liechtenstein) Vaduz	0–2	1–3	1–5
2016–17	UEFA Europa League	First qualifying round	(Lithuania) Trakai	4–1	1–2	5–3
2016–17	UEFA Europa League	Second qualifying round	(Israel) Maccabi Haifa	1–1 (a.e.t.)	1–1	2–2 (5–3 p)
2016–17	UEFA Europa League	Third qualifying round	(Turkey) Osmanlıspor	0–2	0–1	0–3
2017–18	UEFA Europa League	First qualifying round	(Faroe Islands) B36 Tórshavn	2–1	2–1	4–2
2017–18	UEFA Europa League	Second qualifying round	(Hungary) Videoton	0–3	1–1	1–4
2018–19	UEFA Europa League	First qualifying round	(Iceland) Stjarnan	1–0	0–3	1–3
2019–20	UEFA Champions League	First qualifying round	(North Macedonia) Shkëndija	0–1	2–1	2–2 (a)
2019–20	UEFA Champions League	Second qualifying round	(Scotland) Celtic	0–2	0–5	0–7
2019–20	UEFA Europa League	Third qualifying round	(Luxembourg) F91 Dudelange	0–1	1–3	1–4
2020–21	UEFA Europa League	First qualifying round	(Slovenia) Mura	0–4		
2025–26	UEFA Conference League	First qualifying round	(Albania) Partizani	1–1	1–0 (a.e.t.)	2–1
2025–26	UEFA Conference League	Second qualifying round	(Republic of Ireland) St Patrick's Athletic	2–2 (a.e.t.)	0–1	2–3
2026–27	UEFA Conference League	First qualifying round	(Northern Ireland) Linfield	1–0	2–2	3–2
2026–27	UEFA Conference League	Second qualifying round	(Republic of Ireland) Shelbourne	2–1	2–5	4–6
