= Igor Morozov (footballer) =

Estonian footballer

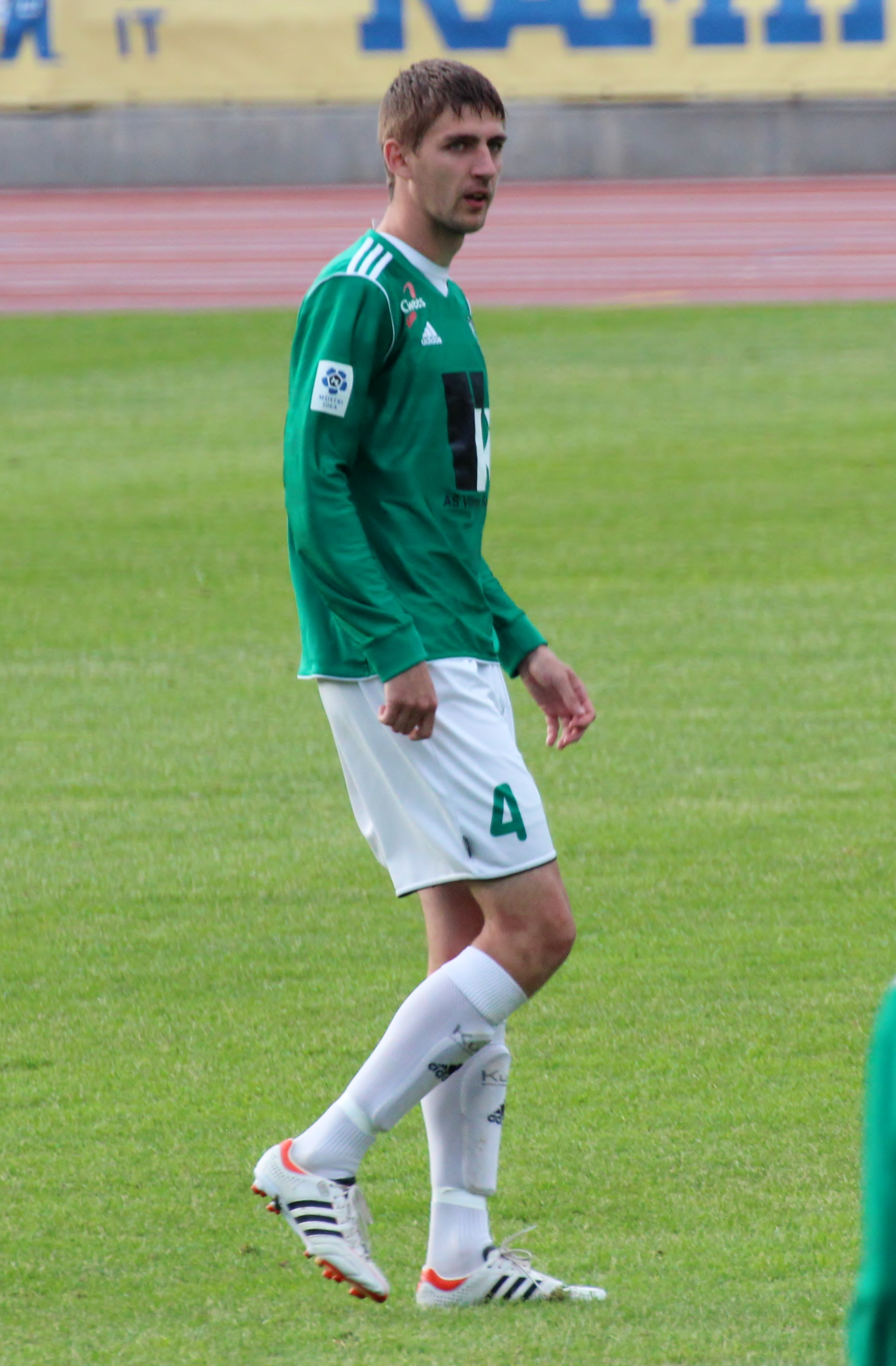
- Morozov with Levadia in 2012

Personal information
- Full name: Igor Morozov
- Date of birth: 27 May 1989 (age 37)
- Place of birth: Tallinn, then part of Estonian SSR, Soviet Union
- Height: 1.93 m (6 ft 4 in)
- Position: Centre back

Youth career
- 2002–2005: Levadia

Senior career*
Years	Team	Apps	(Gls)
2005–2006	Levadia III	29	(1)
2005–2011	Levadia II	83	(8)
2006–2012	Levadia	140	(16)
2013	Polonia Warsaw	13	(0)
2013–2015	Debrecen	23	(0)
2016–2020	Levadia	44	(7)
2017–2021	Levadia II	44	(2)

International career
2006–2007	Estonia U19	13	(2)
2008–2010	Estonia U21	18	(0)
2010–2012	Estonia U23	3	(0)
2008–2018	Estonia	30	(0)

Managerial career
- 2019: Levadia (U14 & U16 assistant)
- 2020–2021: Levadia II (player-assistant)
- 2021–: Estonia U21 (assistant)
- 2022–: Kuressaare (assistant)
- * Club domestic league appearances and goals

Igor Morozov (born 27 May 1989) is an Estonian football manager and former professional player who played as a centre-back.

== Club career ==
=== Levadia ===
Morozov came through the youth system at Levadia. He won two Meistriliiga titles in 2008 and 2009, and was named Meistriliiga Player of the Year in 2012.

=== Polonia Warsaw ===
On 15 January 2013, it was announced that Morozov had signed a two-and-a-half-year contract with Ekstraklasa club Polonia Warsaw.

=== Debrecen ===
On 5 July 2013, Morozov signed a three-year contract with Nemzeti Bajnokság I club Debrecen. He won the Hungarian league title in the 2013–14 season.

=== Return to Levadia ===
On 18 February 2016, Morozov rejoined Levadia on a two-year contract. In January 2020, he was registered for the club's reserve team, FCI Levadia II, where he also would be to assistant coach under head coach Robert Sadovski, which he already worked with as an assistant coach for the U14 and U16 teams of Levadia during the 2018–19 season.

== International career ==
Morozov made his senior international debut for Estonia on 31 May 2008, in 0–1 loss to Lithuania at the Baltic Cup.

== Honours ==
Levadia

- Meistriliiga: 2006, 2007, 2008, 2009
- Estonian Cup: 2006–07, 2009–10, 2011–12, 2017–18, 2020–21
- Estonian Supercup: 2010, 2018

Debrecen

- Nemzeti Bajnokság I: 2013–14

Individual

- Meistriliiga Player of the Month: March 2012
- Meistriliiga Player of the Year: 2012
- Meistriliiga Fans' Player of the Year: 2012
