= FC Viljandi (2011) =

Estonian football club

- Full name: MTÜ FC Viljandi
- Founded: 2011
- Dissolved: 2012
- Ground: Viljandi linnastaadion, Viljandi
- Capacity: 1,006
- Manager: Zaur Tšilingarašvili

FC Viljandi was an Estonian football club from the town of Viljandi, that played in the Estonian Meistriliiga in 2011 and 2012.

== History ==
The club was created in early 2011, after Viljandi JK Tulevik decided to rebuild the squad with local amateur players and dropped down two levels to play in second league. As that left a gap in Meistriliiga, it was filled with a temporary club FC Viljandi, which was mostly composed by the same players that previously played for Tulevik.

The club was withdrawn from the championship after the 2012 season, when Tulevik won promotion to Esiliiga, the second highest division of Estonia.

== FC Viljandi in Estonian football ==
Season	League	Pos	Pld	W	D	L	GF	GA	GD	Pts	Top Goalscorer(s)
2011	1	8	36	8	6	22	37	69	−32	30	Karl Mööl (6)
2012	1	7	36	6	8	22	33	88	−55	26	Jaan Leimann, Marten Mütt (5)

== Managers ==
- 2011–2012: (Estonia) Zaur Tšilingarašvili
