= 2020 in Estonian football =

Football in Estonia
- Season: 2020

Men's football
- Meistriliiga: Tallinna Flora
- Esiliiga: Pärnu Vaprus
- Esiliiga B: Paide Linnameeskond U21
- Beach football: Augur Enemat
- Futsal: Viimsi Smsraha
- Tipneri karikas: Tallinna Flora
- Supercup: Tallinna Flora

Women's football
- Meistriliiga: Tallinna Flora
- Esiliiga: Tallinna Ajax & Paide LN
- Futsal: Pae United
- Estonian Cup: Tallinna Flora

This page summarizes Estonian football in 2020. It contains information about the league system, national teams, beach football and futsal. On 13 March 2020, football was suspended in Estonia due to the COVID-19 pandemic. Meistriliiga was resumed on 19 May and Esiliiga and Esiliiga B were continued a week later.

== National teams ==
=== Men ===
==== Senior ====
26 March 2020 Friendly	Estonia	Cancelled	New Caledonia	Tallinn, Estonia
21:00 (UTC+3)				Stadium: A. Le Coq Arena

3 June 2020 Baltic Cup	Lithuania	Postponed	Estonia	Lithuania

7 June 2020 Friendly	Finland	Postponed	Estonia	Tampere, Finland
16:00 (UTC+3)				Stadium: Tampere Stadium

11 June 2020 Baltic Cup	Estonia	Postponed	Latvia	Kuressaare, Estonia
19:00 (UTC+3)				Stadium: Kuressaare linnastaadion

5 September 2020 Nations League C	Estonia	0–1	Georgia	Tallinn, Estonia
18:00 (19:00 UTC+3)		Report	Kacharava 32'	Stadium: A. Le Coq Arena; Attendance: 0 Referee: Donatas Rumšas (Lithuania)

8 September 2020 Nations League C	Armenia	2–0	Estonia	Yerevan, Armenia
18:00 (20:00 UTC+4)	Karapetian 43'; Wbeymar 65'	Report		Stadium: Vazgen Sargsyan Republican Stadium; Attendance: 0 Referee: David Coote (England)

7 October 2020 Friendly	Estonia	1–3	Lithuania	Tallinn, Estonia
19:00 (UTC+3)	Marin 58'	Report	Novikovas 14', 46'; Sirgedas 32'	Stadium: A. Le Coq Arena; Attendance: 718; Referee: Antti Munukka (Finland)

11 October 2020 Nations League C	Estonia	3–3	North Macedonia	Tallinn, Estonia
18:00 (19:00 UTC+3)	Sappinen 33', 61'; Liivak 76' (pen.)	Report	Kuusk 3' (o.g.); Pandev 80'; Zajkov 88'	Stadium: A. Le Coq Arena; Attendance: 908; Referee: Mohammed Al-Hakim (Sweden)

14 October 2020 Nations League C	Estonia	1–1	Armenia	Tallinn, Estonia
20:45 (21:45 UTC+3)	Sappinen 14'	Report	K. Hovhannisyan 8'	Stadium: A. Le Coq Arena; Attendance: 1007; Referee: Luis Godinho (Portugal)

11 November 2020 Friendly	Italy	4–0	Estonia	Florence, Italy
19:00 (UTC+3)	Grifo 14', 75' (pen.); Bernardeschi 27'; Riccardo Orsolini 86' (pen.)	Report		Stadium: Stadio Artemio Franchi; Attendance: 0 Referee: Rade Obrenović (Slovenia)

15 November 2020 Nations League C	North Macedonia	2–1	Estonia	Skopje, North Macedonia
16:00	Tričkovski 29'; Stojanovski 68'	Report	Sappinen 52'	Stadium: National Arena Toše Proeski; Attendance: 0 Referee: Marius Avram (Romania)

18 November 2020 Nations League C	Georgia	0–0	Estonia	Tbilisi, Georgia
18:00 (21:00 UTC+4)		Report		Stadium: Boris Paichadze Dinamo Arena; Attendance: 0 Referee: Irfan Peljto (Bosnia and Herzegovina)

==== Under 23 ====
No arranged fixtures.

==== Under 21 ====
4 September 2020 Euro 2021 quali.	Estonia	0–6	Poland	Pärnu, Estonia
18:00 (19:00 EEST)		Report	Bogusz 5', 59'; Klimala 16'; Kamiński 35'; Gumny 48'; Tomczyk 82'	Stadium: Pärnu Rannastaadion; Attendance: 0 Referee: Petri Viljanen (Finland)

8 September 2020 Euro 2021 quali.	Latvia	1–1	Estonia	Jelgava, Latvia
16:00 (17:00 EEST)	Regža 62'	Report	Reinkort 54'	Stadium: Zemgale Olympic Center; Attendance: 0 Referee: Goga Kikacheishvili (Georgia)

9 October 2020 Euro 2021 quali.	Russia	4–0	Estonia	Khimki, Russia
17:00 (18:00 MSK)	Villota 8' (o.g.); Kuchayev 13'; Chalov 21' (pen.), 40'	Report		Stadium: Arena Khimki; Attendance: 650; Referee: Antonio Nobre (Portugal)

13 October 2020 Euro 2021 quali.	Estonia	0–0	Serbia	Jūrmala, Latvia
15:00 (16:00 EEST)		Report		Stadium: Slokas Stadium (Note: The match between Estonia and Serbia will be played in Latvia due to travel restrictions related to the COVID-19 pandemic between Estonia and Serbia.); Attendance: 0 Referee: Paul McLaughlin (Ireland)

17 November 2020 Euro 2021 quali.	Bulgaria	3–0	Estonia	Sofia, Bulgaria
17:30 (18:30 EET)	Kotev 28'; Tombak 30'; Krastev 88'	Report		Stadium: Slavia Stadium; Attendance: 0 Referee: Walter Altmann (Austria)

==== Under 19 ====
6 September 2020 Friendly	Estonia	Cancelled	Faroe Islands	Estonia

8 September 2020 Friendly	Estonia	Cancelled	Faroe Islands	Estonia

11 November 2020 Euro 2021 quali.	Republic of Ireland	Postponed	Estonia	Ireland

14 November 2020 Euro 2021 quali.	Poland	Postponed	Estonia	Ireland

17 November 2020 Euro 2021 quali.	Estonia	Postponed	Bosnia and Herzegovina	Ireland

==== Under 18 ====
2 September 2020 Euro 2022 quali.	Kosovo	Postponed	Estonia	Estonia

5 September 2020 Euro 2022 quali.	Armenia	Postponed	Estonia	Estonia

8 September 2020 Euro 2022 quali.	Estonia	Postponed	Luxembourg	Estonia

==== Under 17 ====
28 August 2020 Baltic Cup	Latvia	4–0	Estonia	Jelgava, Latvia
17:00	Dario Šits 3'; Daniels Nosegbe Suško 11'; Armans Muradjans 46'; Gleb Patika 48'	Report		Stadium: Zemgale Olympic Center; Attendance: 0 Referee: Kristaps Ratnieks

29 August 2020 Baltic Cup	Estonia	0–1	Lithuania	Jelgava, Latvia
15:00		Report	Martin Perveinis 41'	Stadium: Zemgale Olympic Center; Attendance: 0 Referee: Arturs Vitolins

21 October 2020 Euro 2021 quali.	Republic of Ireland	Postponed	Estonia	Ireland

24 October 2020 Euro 2021 quali.	Slovakia	Postponed	Estonia	Ireland

27 October 2020 Euro 2021 quali.	Estonia	Postponed	Northern Ireland	Ireland

==== Under 16 ====
No arranged fixtures.

==== Under 15 ====
No arranged fixtures.

=== Women ===
==== Senior ====
6 March 2020 Friendly	Wales	2–0	Estonia	Wrexham, Wales
21:00	Wynne 69'; Lawrence 69'	Report		Stadium: Racecourse Ground; Attendance: 2,015; Referee: Lorraine Watson

9 March 2020 Friendly	Faroe Islands	1–1	Estonia	Tórshavn, Faroe Islands
19:00	Andreasen 88'	Report	Bannikova 61'	Stadium: Tórsvøllur; Referee: Alex Troleis

18 September 2020 Euro 2021 quali.	Kosovo	2–0	Estonia	Pristina, Kosovo
19:00	Biqkaj 7', 27'	Report		Stadium: Fadil Vokrri Stadium; Attendance: 0 Referee: Olivia Tschon (Austria)

22 September 2020 Euro 2021 quali.	Estonia	0–3	Russia	Jūrmala, Latvia
15:00 (16:00 EEST)		Report	Yakovleva 23'; Mashina 76'; Korovkina 90+4'	Stadium: Slokas Stadium; Attendance: 0 Referee: Simona Ghisletta (Switzerland)

23 October 2020 Euro 2021 quali.	Netherlands	7–0	Estonia	Groningen, Netherlands
19:30	Van de Donk 7', 16'; Groenen 26', 65'; Spitse 38' (pen.); Nouwen 76'; Snoeijs 83'	Report		Stadium: Euroborg; Attendance: 0 Referee: Tess Olofsson (Sweden)

February 2021 (Note: Matches originally scheduled to be played on 22 September 2020 were rearranged following postponements to other matches due to the COVID-19 pandemic in Europe.) Euro 2021 quali.	Estonia	Postponed	Slovenia	Tallinn, Estonia
		Report		Stadium: A. Le Coq Arena; Referee: Volha Tsiareshka (Belarus)

26 November 2020 Friendly	Estonia	Cancelled	Belarus	Tallinn, Estonia
				Stadium: EJL Sisehall

27 November 2020 Euro 2021 quali.	Estonia	0–4	Turkey	Tallinn, Estonia
17:00 (18:00 EET)		Report	Türkoğlu 29'; Civelek 55'; Hız 76'; Uraz 81'	Stadium: Sportsland; Attendance: 127; Referee: Volha Tsiareshka (Belarus)

29 November 2020 Friendly	Estonia	Cancelled	Belarus	Tallinn, Estonia
				Stadium: EJL Sisehall

1 December 2020 Euro 2021 quali.	Slovenia	2–0	Estonia	Koper, Slovenia
18:00	Kralj 27'; Kork 59' (o.g.)	Report		Stadium: Bonifika Stadium; Attendance: 0 Referee: Maria Marotta (Italy)

==== Under 19 ====
No arranged fixtures.

==== Under 17 ====
No arranged fixtures.

==== Under 15 ====
No arranged fixtures.

=== Futsal ===
30 January 2020 Euro 2022 quali.	Estonia	1–6	Latvia	Jelgava, Latvia
19:00 (UTC+3)	E. Stüf 22'	Report	Kulešovs 2', 11'; Babris 5', 19'; Matjušenko 25'; J. Pastars 37'	Stadium: Zemgale Olympic Center; Referee: (Switzerland) David Schaerli

31 January 2020 Euro 2022 quali.	Denmark	4–2	Estonia	Jelgava, Latvia
19:00 (UTC+3)	Mengel 9', 16'; Falck 13'; Laursen 33'	Report	Babjak 24'; Haagh 40' (o.g.)	Stadium: Zemgale Olympic Center; Referee: (Greece) Vasilios Christodoulis

=== Beach ===
No arranged fixtures.

== League system ==
=== Men ===
==== Meistriliiga ====
The 2020 season saw one new team. Maardu Linnameeskond finished last in 2019, and as such, were automatically relegated to the Esiliiga. They were replaced by Tallinna Legion, a team that had been promoted three seasons in a row. Manager Denis Belov said that the club were aiming for a top four position, with the debutant making several high-profile signings (these being Maksim Gussev, Pavel Londak and Andrei Sidorenkov). Additionally, two of the top three teams from the previous season hired a new manager. FCI Levadia hired former national team coach Martin Reim, while Nõmme Kalju's new manager was Marko Kristal. Due to the COVID-19 pandemic, the Estonian FA decided to split the league into 'champion' (top six teams) and 'relegation (bottom four teams) groups after the 27th round. On the 7th of November it was decided that instead of the top six teams playing each other after the 27th round, only the league's four best teams will play with each other once more. The 5th and 6th placed clubs will play a match if the 6th team has a possibility of catching the 5th placed team.

Pos	Team	Pld	W	D	L	GF	GA	GD	Pts	Qualification or relegation
1	Tallinna Flora (C)	29	26	2	1	76	17	+59	80	Qualification for the Champions League first qualifying round
2	Paide Linnameeskond	30	21	1	8	80	43	+37	64	Qualification for the Europa Conference League first qualifying round
3	Tallinna Levadia	29	17	6	6	66	37	+29	57	
4	Nõmme Kalju	30	14	7	9	52	31	+21	49	
5	Tartu Tammeka	28	8	8	12	33	44	−11	32	
6	Viljandi Tulevik	28	9	4	15	30	46	−16	31	
7	Tallinna Legion	30	8	7	15	26	44	−18	31	
8	Narva Trans	30	6	7	17	31	49	−18	25	
9	Kuressaare (O)	30	5	9	16	28	63	−35	24	Qualification for the relegation play-offs
10	Tallinna Kalev (R)	30	5	5	20	20	68	−48	20	Relegation to the Esiliiga

Source: UEFA, Estonian FA (in Estonian)
Rules for classification: 1) Points; 2) Less matches awarded against; 3) Head-to-head points; 4) Head-to-head goal difference; 5) Matches won; 6) Goal difference; 7) Goals scored; 8) Away goals scored; 9) Fairplay ranking.
(C) Champions; (O) Play-off winners; (R) Relegated
Locations of the 2020 Meistriliiga teams

Relegation play-off:

Team 1	Agg.	Team 2	1st leg	2nd leg
Maardu Linnameeskond (Esiliiga 2nd)	5–9	Kuressaare (Meistriliiga 9th)	3–5	2–4

==== Esiliiga ====
There were four changes of clubs compared to the 2019 season. Esiliiga B's reigning champion Nõmme United were promoted to the second tier for the first time in their history, while Pärnu and Vändra Vaprus were also promoted, returning to the league after twelve and four years respectively in lower divisions. The three clubs replaced Tartu Welco, Tallinna Kalev U21 and Rakvere Tarvas, who were relegated after the 2019 season. Maardu Linnameeskond was relegated from the top division, taking the place of 2019 Esiliiga champion Tallinna Legion. Due to the COVID-19 pandemic, the Estonian FA decided to split the league into 'promotion' (top six teams) and 'relegation (bottom four teams) groups after the 27th round.

Pos	Team	Pld	W	D	L	GF	GA	GD	Pts	Promotion, qualification or relegation
1	Pärnu Vaprus (C, P)	32	19	8	5	72	30	+42	65	Promotion to the Meistriliiga
2	Maardu Linnameeskond	32	20	4	8	68	45	+23	64	Qualification for promotion play-offs
3	Nõmme United	32	16	7	9	76	43	+33	55	
4	Tallinna Flora U21 (Note: Reserve teams are ineligible for promotion.)	32	15	6	11	64	46	+18	51	
5	Elva	32	14	7	11	54	52	+2	49	
6	Tartu Tammeka U21	32	12	3	17	47	68	−21	39	
7	Tallinna Levadia U21	30	12	5	13	42	41	+1	41	
8	Pärnu (O)	30	11	7	12	61	56	+5	40	Qualification for relegation play-offs
9	Vändra Vaprus (R)	30	10	2	18	47	72	−25	32	Relegation to Esiliiga B
10	Kohtla-Järve Järve (R)	30	1	3	26	13	91	−78	3 (Note: Kohtla-Järve Järve were deducted 3 points for financial troubles.)	Relegation to Esiliiga B

Source: Soccerway (in English), Estonian FA (in Estonian)
Rules for classification: 1) Points; 2) Less matches awarded against; 3) Head-to-head points; 4) Head-to-head goal difference; 5) Matches won; 6) Goal difference; 7) Goals scored; 8) Away goals scored; 9) Fairplay ranking.
(C) Champions; (O) Play-off winners; (P) Promoted; (R) Relegated
Notes:
Locations of the 2020 Esiliiga teams

Relegation play-off:

Team 1	Agg.	Team 2	1st leg	2nd leg
Tabasalu (Esiliiga B 4th)	2–8	Pärnu (Esiliiga 8th)	1–3	1–5

==== Esiliiga B ====
The 2020 Esiliiga B season introduced four new clubs to the division: for the first time a team from Lääne County - Läänemaa, and three bottom teams of the 2019 Esiliiga season - Rakvere Tarvas, Tallinna Kalev U21 and Tartu Welco. These clubs replace the worst team of last season - Põhja-Tallinna Volta - and the three best teams - Pärnu JK, Vändra Vaprus and Nõmme United. Due to the COVID-19 pandemic, the Estonian FA decided to split the league into 'promotion' (top four teams) and 'relegation (bottom four teams) groups after the 27th round. The fifth and sixth team will play another match if the sixth team has a possibility of catching the fifth team.

Pos	Team	Pld	W	D	L	GF	GA	GD	Pts	Promotion, qualification or relegation
1	Paide Linnameeskond U21 (C, P)	30	23	2	5	112	40	+72	71	Promotion to the Esiliiga
2	Tartu Welco (P)	30	20	2	8	81	50	+31	62	Promotion to the Esiliiga
3	Tallinna Kalev U21 (Note: Tallinna Kalev U21 is ineligible for promotion because their first team got relegated to Esiliiga.)	30	19	1	10	81	59	+22	58	
4	Tabasalu	30	16	3	11	58	46	+12	51	Qualification for promotion play-offs
5	Viimsi	28	12	5	11	60	44	+16	41	
6	Läänemaa	28	11	3	14	55	64	−9	36	
7	Nõmme Kalju U21	30	11	2	17	49	78	−29	35	
8	Võru Helios (R)	30	10	5	15	55	68	−13	35	Qualification for relegation play-offs
9	Keila (R)	30	8	6	16	61	93	−32	30	Relegation to II Liiga
10	Rakvere Tarvas (R)	30	3	1	26	26	96	−70	10	Relegation to II Liiga

Source: Soccerway (in English), Estonian FA (in Estonian)
Rules for classification: 1) Points; 2) Less matches awarded against; 3) Head-to-head points; 4) Head-to-head goal difference; 5) Matches won; 6) Goal difference; 7) Goals scored; 8) Away goals scored; 9) Fairplay ranking.
(C) Champions; (P) Promoted; (R) Relegated
Notes:
Locations of the 2020 Esiliiga B teams

Relegation play-off:

Team 1	Agg.	Team 2	1st leg	2nd leg
Tallinn (II N/E 2nd)	—	Raasiku Joker (II S/W 2nd)	—	—

Team 1	Agg.	Team 2	1st leg	2nd leg
Tallinn (II league play-off winner)	1–0	Võru Helios (Esiliiga B 8th)	1–0	0–0

==== II liiga ====
Locations of the 2020 II liiga teams

Group A (North & East)
Compared to the 2019 season, there were three changes of teams. FC Tallinn, winner of the III liiga East, and play-off winner Tartu Helios were promoted from the III liiga, replacing Tartu Santos and Tallinna Ararat, who were both relegated. Meanwhile, Põhja-Tallinna Volta were relegated from the Esiliiga B after just one season. They took their reserve team's spot in the league, who were hence relegated to the III liiga. While two clubs (FCI Tallinn and Sillamäe Kalev) would have been promoted to the Esiliiga B from the results of the previous season, both remained in the fourth tier of Estonian football. FCI Tallinn could not be promoted as they were the second reserve team of FCI Levadia and would have been required to compete in the third tier as Tallinna FCI Levadia U19. Sillamäe Kalev, on the other hand, was yet to pay its debts and was forbidden from entering the top three leagues.

The 2020 season ended with Tallinna JK Legion II winning its first title. They were ahead of the second-placed debutant FC Tallinn by only head-to-head points (5:2 and 3:2 to Legion II) and FCI Tallinn, who were the reigning champions, finished third with 57 points, which is the most points for a bronze medalist. Jõgeva Wolves withdrew their last two games (in addition to one in the middle of the season) and was therefore disqualified from the league. The second to last team was Tartu Tammeka III, who was passed by Tartu Helios in the last rounds. The season's most-watched game was held on 29 July, when Narva Trans U21 defeated Tallinna Legion II. The match, which was played on the Narva Kalev-FAMA stadium, had 202 people in attendance.

Group B (South & West)

While in previous years the league had seen many arrivals and departures every season, in 2020, only two clubs joined the league. Two clubs from the Saue Parish were victorious in their respective leagues: Saue, champions of the 2019 III liiga West, made its return to the league after three years, while Harju Laagri made its debut in the fourth tier of Estonian football after winning the III liiga North in 2019. These two clubs will replace Läänemaa, who got promoted to the Esiliiga B (as neither Paide Linnameeskond III nor Tallinna Kalev III could have been promoted), and Kose, who finished the 2019 season in last place and were relegated to the III liiga West.

Due to the COVID-19 pandemic previous season's second-best team, Tallinna Kalev III, decided against taking part this season. They got replaced by Kose, who was originally supposed to play in III liiga. The season was comfortably won by Paide Linnameeskond III, who won its third title in a row. In addition, it is the best result – only one draw and zero losses from 26 games – in the league's history (Pärnu Vaprus also amassed 76 points in 2004 but had two games more). Due to the fact that Paide Linnameeskond III would have to change its name to Paide Linnameeskond U19, the club opted against getting promoted. Therefore, second-placed Harju Laagri got promoted instead. Also, none of the following three teams (Raasiku Joker, Saue and Kuressaare II) wanted to participate in the promotion play-offs and thus II liiga N/E second-placed Tallinn got to play with Esiliiga B's 8th team. The season's relegated teams were Pärnu Poseidon and Kose, who were in the bottom two for most of the year. Põhja-Sakala was third from last and had to compete in the relegation play-offs. In the end they decided against playing and were thus also relegated. The league's top scorer was Kuressaare II's Maarek Suursaar with his 38 goals. The most-viewed game of the 2020 season was held in the second to last round when the champions beat the home team Raplamaa in front of 132 fans.

Group A (North & East)
Pos	Team	Pld	Pts
1	Tallinna Legion II (C, P)	26	60
2	Tallinn (P)	26	60
3	FCI Tallinn	26	57
4	Narva Trans U21	26	53
5	Tartu Welco II	26	45
6	Sillamäe Kalev	26	42
7	Põhja-Tallinna Volta	26	33
8	Jõgeva Noorus-96	26	33
9	Kohtla-Järve Järve U21	26	32
10	Maardu Linnameeskond II	26	30
11	Tartu Helios	26	28
12	Lasnamäe Ajax	26	24
13	Tartu Tammeka III (R)	26	21
14	Jõgeva Wolves (D, R)	26	10

Source: EJL
(C) Champions; (D) Disqualified; (P) Promoted; (R) Relegated

Group B (South & West)
Pos	Team	Pld	Pts
1	Paide Linnameeskond III (C)	26	76
2	Harju Laagri (P)	26	59
3	Raasiku Joker	26	57
4	Saue	26	55
5	Kuressaare II	26	51
6	Viimsi II	26	41
7	Raplamaa	26	37
8	Tallinna Piraaja	26	33
9	Tallinna Flora U19	26	31
10	Viljandi Tulevik U21	26	27
11	Pärnu Vaprus II	26	26
12	Põhja-Sakala (R)	26	20
13	Kose	26	9
14	Pärnu Poseidon (R)	26	6

Source: EJL
(C) Champions; (P) Promoted; (R) Relegated

Champion's match:

21 November Final	Paide Linnameeskond III	0–0 (4–5 p)	Tallinna JK Legion II	Paide, Estonia
13:00 UTC+03		Report		Stadium: Paide kunstmuruväljak Attendance: 80; Referee: Karl Kena

Relegation play-off:
The play-offs for the last places in the next season's II liiga were held on four separate occasions: first the preliminary rounds on the 8th and 14 November and later the finals on the 18th and 22 November. The preliminary rounds are held between the second-placed teams in the fifth division (the South and West as well as the North and East silver medalists play each other). Due to the fact that the South league's second team Otepää did not wish to get promoted, Rummu Dünamo reached the finals without a game. In addition, their next opponent Põhja-Sakala also forfeited the duel and thus the team playing in Paldiski Arena was promoted to the higher tier. In the North-East side there were more play-off games: while the III liiga North second-placed Tallinna Zenit also opted against promotion, they were replaced by the sixth placed Saku Sporting. In the end the club situated in Saku managed to defeat Paide Linnameeskond IV and reach the finals, where they went against Lasnamäe Ajax, who competed in the Esiliiga B two years before. Saku won their first match at home, but suffered a 0–3 loss in Tallinn.

Team 1	Agg.	Team 2	1st leg	2nd leg
Saku Sporting (III N 6th)	8–7	Paide Linnameeskond IV (III E 2nd)	5–3	3–4
Saku Sporting (play-off winner)	4–6	Lasnamäe FC Ajax (II N/E 12th)	4–3	0–3

Team 1	Agg.	Team 2	1st leg	2nd leg
Rummu Dünamo (III W 2nd)	w/o	Otepää (III S 2nd)	—	—
Rummu Dünamo (play-off winner)	w/o	Põhja-Sakala (II S/W 12th)	—	—

==== III liiga ====
Locations of the 2020 III liiga teams

Group A (North)
Estonian's fifth tier North division, which has mostly clubs from the capital, had three new teams in 2020. Tallinna Ararat, who got relegated from II liiga after last season, joined the league after nine seasons in upper divisions. In addition, IV liiga's champion Nõmme Kalju III and Toompea got promoted and therefore replaced Harju Laagri (promoted), Tallinna Olympic Olybet and Maarjamäe Igiliikur (both relegated). Tallinna Štrommi, who finished last in 2019, got to stay in the division.

The season finished with Lilleküla Retro winning its third title in the III liiga. The team, who was managed by Tarmo Rüütli, only lost three games during the whole season and ended the year with an eleven-point gap to the nearest rival Tallinna Zenit. The league's top scorer was Retro's striker Dmitry Skiperskiy with his 37 goals in 22 games. The two teams who got relegated where Toompea, who lost 13 games in a row, and Rumori Calcio, who got passed by Nõmme Kalju III in the penultimate round. Due to the fact that none of the teams above the sixth-placed Saku Sporting wished to get promoted, the Harjumaa-based team got to participate in the promotion play-offs.

Group B (South)
III liiga South had four changes in comparison to the previous year: both Tartu Helios II and Tartu TRT77 will be debuting in the fifth division, Põlva Lootos returns after a year in the IV liiga and Imavere joins the league after having skipped last season entirely. These teams replace Tartu Helios (promoted), Illi & Jõgeva Noorus-96 ÜM (relegated) as well as EMÜ and Võru Helios II, who will not participate in the league system this year.

The season, which was extremely close-fought, ended with Elva II's winning its first title. They were four points ahead of Otepää, who were the reigning champions of III liiga South. One of the season's best performers were Vastseliina, who managed to be at the top of the table for the first fourteen rounds. Their downfall came in the autumn, when they lost four of their last eight matches. The relegation battle was between three teams - Tartu TRT77, Põlva Lootos and Äksi Wolves. While for most of the season, the trio was extremely close, then in the last few rounds, the Jõgevamaa based team fell behind. Due to the fact that in the 17th round, Tarvastu & Tõrva ÜM withdrew for a second time, they were instantly disqualified from the season. Therefore, them as well as Wolves got relegated. In addition to them, 10th placed Lootos lost to Tallinna Jalgpallihaigla in the relegation play-offs and was also relegated. The season's top scorer was Elva's Karl-Ernst Saal with his 33 goals.

Group C (East)
In this season's East division there are four new members. Kohtla-Järve Järve III (promoted), Rakvere Tarvas II, Tartu Kalev and Jõhvi Phoenix, who all have not participated in any division in the last few years. They replace Tallinna Augur (relegated), Tallinn (promoted), and Kadrina as well as Põhja-Tallinna Volta III. After the COVID-19 outbreak two teams - Sillamäe and Koeru - decided also not to take part in the league this year. Therefore, there are only ten teams competing this year. One remarkable addition was made by Phoenix, who signed Vladimir Aga, former Zimbru Chișinău head coach, as their new manager.

Group D (West)
Western Estonia's III league had, as III liiga East, only ten teams taking part of the season. After the COVID-19 pandemic, Kose and Pärnu Poseidon II, who were both originally supposed to play in III liiga West, were respectively promoted and relegated one league tier. Also, Põhja-Tallinna Volta II, Tabasalu II, Tallinna Legion III and Tallinna Pocarr will compete and therefore replace Saaremaa aameraaS, Pakri Alexela, Kohila Püsivus (all not taking part of the league system), Saue (promoted) and Haapsalu (relegated).

Group A (North)
Pos	Team	Pld	Pts
1	Lilleküla Retro (C, P)	22	57
2	Tallinna Zenit	22	46
3	Tallinna Hell Hunt	22	44
4	Tallinna Zapoos	22	43
5	Tallinna Eston Villa	22	40
6	Saku Sporting	22	39
7	Tallinna Ararat	22	36
8	Tallinna Dünamo	22	29
9	Tallinna Štrommi	22	15
10	Nõmme Kalju III	22	14
11	Rumori Calcio (R)	22	12
12	Toompea (R)	22	7

(C) Champions; (P) Promoted; (R) Relegated

Group B (South)
Pos	Team	Pld	Pts
1	Elva II (C, P)	22	56
2	Otepää	22	52
3	Imavere	22	46
4	Vastseliina	22	46
5	Tartu Welco X	22	45
6	Tartu Tammeka IV	22	34
7	Valga Warrior	22	24
8	Tartu Helios II	22	21
9	Tartu TRT77	22	14
10	Põlva Lootos (R)	22	14
11	Äksi Wolves (R)	22	8
12	Tarvastu & Tõrva (D, R)	22	23

(C) Champions; (D) Disqualified; (P) Promoted; (R) Relegated

Group C (East)
Pos	Team	Pld	Pts
1	Tartu Kalev (C, P)	18	54
2	Paide Linnameeskond IV	18	37
3	Rakvere Tarvas II	18	32
4	Türi Ganvix	18	26
5	Järva-Jaani	18	24
6	Kohtla-Järve Järve III	18	23
7	Jõhvi Phoenix	18	22
8	Loo	18	17
9	Maardu Aliens	18	14
10	Anija (R)	18	13

(C) Champions; (P) Promoted; (R) Relegated

Group D (West)
Pos	Team	Pld	Pts
1	Hiiumaa (C, P)	18	39
2	Rummu Dünamo (O, P)	18	38
3	Tallinna Pocarr	18	37
4	Tabasalu II	18	34
5	Tallinna Legion III	18	27
6	Pärnu II	18	19
7	Keila II	18	18
8	Märjamaa Kompanii	18	17
9	Kernu Kadakas	18	16
10	Põhja-Tallinna Volta II	18	13

(C) Champions; (O) Play-off winners; (P) Promoted

League champion:

Semifinals
N	Lilleküla Retro	0
E	Tartu Kalev	2
S	Elva II	1
W	Hiiumaa	0

Final
E	Tartu Kalev	4
S	Elva II	0

Relegation play-off:

Team 1	Agg.	Team 2	1st leg	2nd leg
Kristiine (IV B 1st)	—	Nõmme Kalju III (III N 10th)	—	—

Team 1	Agg.	Team 2	1st leg	2nd leg
Tallinna TransferWise (IV B 2nd)	—	Põhja-Tallinna Volta II (III E 10th)	—	—

Team 1	Agg.	Team 2	1st leg	2nd leg
Läänemaa Haapsalu (IV B 3rd)	13–4	Anija (III W 10th)	10–2	3–2

Team 1	Agg.	Team 2	1st leg	2nd leg
Tallinna Jalgpallihaigla (IV B 4th)	4–2	Põlva Lootos (III S 10th)	2–2	2–0

==== IV liiga ====
Group A (North)
Pos	Team	Pld	Pts
1	Aruküla	14	40
2	Maarjamäe IGI	14	31
3	Tallinna Wolves	14	25
4	Tallinna Piraaja II	14	23
5	Tallinna Soccernet	14	18
6	Kose II	14	13
7	Rumouri Calcio II	14	11
8	Pärnu Poseidon II	14	3

Group B (South)
Pos	Team	Pld	Pts
1	Viljandi Tulevik III	10	21
2	Lasnamäe Ajax II	10	16
3	Kristiine	10	16
4	Illi & Jõgeva Noorus-96	10	16
5	Tallinna Teleios	10	9
6	Lelle	10	9

Group C (East)
Pos	Team	Pld	Pts
1	Viimsi Lõvid	10	24
2	Tallinna ReUnited	10	23
3	Tallinna TransferWise	10	18
4	Tallinna Jalgpallihaigla	10	11
5	Kuusalu Kalev	10	9
6	Loo II	10	1

Group D (West)
Pos	Team	Pld	Pts
1	Tallinna Olympic Olybet	10	25
2	Rummu Dünamo II	10	22
3	Tallinna Reaal	10	13
4	Tallinna Eston Villa II	10	11
5	Läänemaa Haapsalu	10	11
6	Tallinna Augur	10	4

Group A (First tier)
Pos	Team	Pld	Pts
1	Tallinna ReUnited	7	21
2	Viimsi Lõvid	7	12
3	Aruküla	7	11
4	Tallinna Olympic Olybet	7	10
5	Rummu Dünamo II	7	10
6	Viljandi Tulevik III	7	9
7	Lasnamäe Ajax II	7	6
8	Maarjamäe IGI	7	2

Group B (Second tier)
Pos	Team	Pld	Pts
1	Kristiine	9	20
2	Tallinna TransferWise	9	19
3	Läänemaa Haapsalu	9	19
4	Tallinna Jalgpallihaigla	9	15
5	Illi & Jõgeva Noorus-96	9	15
6	Tallinna Wolves	9	10
7	Tallinna Eston Villa II	9	9
8	Tallinna Soccernet	9	8
9	Tallinna Piraaja II	9	8
10	Tallinna Reaal	9	7

Group C (Third tier)
Pos	Team	Pld	Pts
1	Pärnu Poseidon II	7	17
2	Tallinna Teleios	7	14
3	Kuusalu Kalev	7	12
4	Loo II	7	10
5	Lelle	7	8
6	Rumouri Calcio II	7	7
7	Kose II	7	7
8	Tallinna Augur	7	4

Updated to match(es) played on 25 October. Source:

=== Women ===
==== Naiste Meistriliiga ====
After the conclusion of the 2019 season, Pärnu JK announced that they will not compete in the 2020 season due to financial difficulties. Therefore, both Nõmme Kalju and Pärnu Vaprus will be promoted to the top division, as Tallinna Legion, Tallinna Ajax and Kuressaare did not want to join the league. Coincidentally, Nõmme Kalju and Pärnu Vaprus both played in the 2019 Esiliiga relegation play-offs.

Pos	Team	Pld	W	D	L	GF	GA	GD	Pts	Promotion, qualification or relegation
1	Tallinna Flora (C)	19	17	2	0	100	9	+91	53	Champions
2	Tallinna Kalev	19	12	1	6	63	39	+24	37	
3	Saku Sporting	19	11	2	6	60	27	+33	35	
4	Pärnu Vaprus	19	7	4	8	36	59	−23	25	
5	Põlva Lootos	20	10	2	8	35	45	−10	32	
6	Viljandi Tulevik & Suure-Jaani United	20	6	4	10	37	62	−25	22	
7	Tartu Tammeka (O)	20	5	2	13	21	45	−24	17	Qualification for the relegation play-offs
8	Nõmme Kalju (R)	20	1	1	18	6	72	−66	4	Relegation to the Esiliiga

Updated to match(es) played on 7 November. Source:
Rules for classification: 1) points; 2) goal difference; 3) number of goals scored
(C) Champions; (O) Play-off winners; (R) Relegated
Locations of the 2020 Meistriliiga teams

Relegation play-off:

Team 1	Agg.	Team 2	1st leg	2nd leg
Tabasalu (Esiliiga 2nd)	0–3	Tartu Tammeka (Meistriliiga 7th)	0–1	0–2

==== Naiste Esiliiga ====
For the first time in nine years, Naiste Esiliiga is the lowest tier of women's football in Estonia. This was caused by the fact that only four teams applied for the II liiga spot. Therefore, the Estonian FA decided to merge the second and the third tier of women's football. The 2020 season has 12 competitors: five teams remain from last season, three are promoted from the II liiga, three clubs make their debut (Tabasalu, Rakvere Tarvas and Jõhvi Phoenix) and in addition, Tallinna Ajax merged with Paide Linnanaiskond. During the season's main phase, each team played once with each other. After the 11th round, the league table was split in half and every team played five more games.

The season ended with Tallinna Ajax & Paide Linnanaiskond winning their first Esiliiga title. This ended Pärnu's reserve team's streak of winning six titles in a row. Silvermedalists – Tabasalu – spent most of the season right behind the eventual winners. Their title hopes collapsed in the 13th round, when they lost 0:4 to Tallinna Ajax & Paide Linnanaiskond. In the last three rounds they only got three points. Despite their poor finish, they still qualified for the promotion play-offs, where they will go against Meistriliiga's 7th team Tartu Tammeka. Kohtla-Järve Järve's season was extremely unsuccessful as they received zero points and had 141 goals scored against them.

The season's top scorer was Tallinna Ajax & Paide Linnanaiskond's striker Gerli Israel, who scored 26 goals.

Pos	Team	Pld	W	D	L	GF	GA	GD	Pts	Promotion, qualification or relegation
1	Tallinna Ajax & Paide LN (C, P)	16	15	0	1	71	13	+58	45	Promotion to 2021 Naiste Meistriliiga
2	Tabasalu (Q)	16	12	0	4	61	17	+44	36	Qualification to Promotion play-offs
3	Tallinna Flora II	16	11	2	3	58	14	+44	35	
4	Tallinna Kalev II	16	9	4	3	36	19	+17	31	
5	Kuressaare	16	7	2	7	50	26	+24	23	
6	Tallinna Legion	16	5	2	9	27	40	−13	17	
7	Rakvere Tarvas	16	7	3	6	51	35	+16	24	
8	Jõhvi Phoenix	16	5	6	5	26	35	−9	21	
9	Narva Trans	16	5	1	10	37	41	−4	16	
10	Elva	16	4	2	10	25	46	−21	14	
11	Tartu Tammeka II	16	3	4	9	10	27	−17	13	
12	Kohtla-Järve Järve	16	0	0	16	2	141	−139	0	

Rules for classification: 1) Points; 2) Less matches awarded against; 3) Head-to-head points; 4) Head-to-head goal difference; 5) Matches won; 6) Goal difference; 7) Goals scored; 8) Away goals scored; 9) Drawing lots; 10) Fairplay ranking.
(C) Champions; (P) Promoted; (Q) Qualified for the phase indicated
Locations of the 2020 Esiliiga teams

- TALLINN → Ajax & Paide, Flora II, Kalev II, Legion

=== Youth ===
==== U19 leagues ====
U19 Eliitliiga Meistriliiga play-off:

4. January 2020 Preseason play-off	Viljandi Tulevik U19	1–3	Nõmme Kalju U19	Tallinn
13:00	Jarmo Randmäe 79'	Report	Karl Siimson 7' (o.g.); Kristjan Rattasepp 37'; Karl Stefan Lill 52'	Stadium: EJL jalgpallihall Attendance: 49; Referee: Martti Pukk

Main season:

Meistriliiga group A
Pos	Team	Pld	Pts
1	Tartu Tammeka U19	3	7
2	Tallinna Kalev U19	3	4
3	Nõmme Kalju U19	3	3
4	Tallinna Flora U19	3	3

Updated to match(es) played on 30 May. Source:

Meistriliiga group B
Pos	Team	Pld	Pts
1	Tallinna Legion U19	3	9
2	Nõmme United U19	3	6
3	Tabasalu U19	3	3
4	Tallinna Levadia U19	3	0

Updated to match(es) played on 19 February. Source:

Semifinals
Tallinna Legion U19	6
Tallinna Kalev U19	1
Nõmme United U19	0
Tartu Tammeka U19	1

Final
Tallinna Legion U19	0
Tartu Tammeka U19	1

Esiliiga
Pos	Team	Pld	Pts
1	Tallinna Legion U19	14	34
2	Nõmme United U19	13	28
3	Tabasalu U19	14	22
4	Tallinna Levadia U19	13	19
5	Nõmme Kalju U19	13	19
6	Raplamaa U19	13	7
7	Tallinna Flora U19	14	4

Updated to match(es) played on 16 October. Source:

==== U17 leagues ====
Esiliiga
Pos	Team	Pld	Pts
1	Tallinna Flora	18	45
2	Tartu Tammeka	18	38
3	Harju Laagri	17	30
4	Tallinna Legion	17	28
5	Ida- ja Lääne Virumaa	17	26
6	Tallinna Levadia	17	21
7	Paide Linnameeskond	18	20
8	Nõmme United	18	19
9	Tartu Kalev	17	12
10	Tabasalu	17	10

Updated to match(es) played on 14 November. Source:

II liiga group A
Pos	Team	Pld	Pts
1	Pärnu Vaprus	10	30
2	Tallinn	10	21
3	Läänemaa & Hiiumaa	10	18
4	Maardu Linnameeskond	10	18
5	Kuressaare	10	16
6	Keila	10	16
7	Tallinna Kalev	10	16
8	Tallinna Flora II	10	13
9	Saku Sporting	10	12
10	Kuusalu Kalev	10	3
11	Tallinna Ajax	10	0

II liiga group B
Pos	Team	Pld	Pts
1	Tartu Santos	9	25
2	Narva Trans	9	20
3	Võru Helios & Elva	9	19
4	Rakvere Tarvas	9	15
5	Tartu Tammeka II	9	13
6	Viljandi Tulevik	9	13
7	Eesti U15	9	11
8	Sillamäe Kalev & Phoenix	9	7
9	Tartu Helios	9	5
10	Kohtla-Järve Järve	9	0

II liiga A-tier
Pos	Team	Pld	Pts
1	Tartu Santos	9	24
2	Maardu Linnameeskond	9	18
3	Narva Trans	9	17
4	Pärnu Vaprus	9	16
5	Tallinn	9	15
6	Rakvere Tarvas	9	12
7	Kuressaare	9	9
8	Võru Helios & Elva	9	8
9	Tartu Tammeka II	9	6
10	Läänemaa & Hiiumaa	9	6

II liiga B-tier
Pos	Team	Pld	Pts
1	Viljandi Tulevik	9	21
2	Eesti U15	9	19
3	Tallinna Kalev	9	16
4	Saku Sporting	9	16
5	Sillamäe Kalev & Phoenix	9	15
6	Kuusalu Kalev	9	12
7	Tartu Helios	9	11
8	Keila	9	8
9	Tallinna Flora II	9	7
10	Kohtla-Järve Järve	9	6

==== U16 leagues ====
Esiliiga
Pos	Team	Pld	Pts
1	Nõmme United	18	47
2	Harju Laagri	18	43
3	Sillamäe Kalev & Phoenix ÜM	18	38
4	Nõmme Kalju I	18	29
5	Tabasalu	18	25
6	Tallinna Kalev Valge	18	25
7	Viimsi MRJK	18	22
8	Tallinna Flora I	18	20
9	Tallinna Levadia	18	12
10	Maardu Linnameeskond	18	0

II liiga
Pos	Team	Pld	Pts
1	Rakvere Tarvas & Irbis ÜM	18	52
2	Pärnu Vaprus	18	41
3	Tartu Merkuur-Juunior	18	40
4	Tallinna Kalev Sinine	18	36
5	Tallinna Kalev Jüri	18	30
6	Nõmme Kalju II	18	22
7	Kose	18	17
8	Tallinna Legion	18	16
9	Saku Sporting	18	11
10	Vasalemma	18	0

III liiga
Pos	Team	Pld	Pts
1	Tartu Tammeka	15	36
2	Võru Helios	15	35
3	Paide Linnameeskond	15	25
4	Raasiku Joker	15	18
5	Lõuna-Läänemaa	14	14
6	Tallinna Flora II	14	12
7	Tallinna Ajax	14	8

==== U15 leagues ====
Esiliiga
Pos	Team	Pld	Pts
1	Tallinn I (C)	18	44
2	Tartu Tammeka	18	37
3	Narva Trans	18	31
4	Tallinna Levadia Roheline	18	30
5	FCI Tallinn	18	29
6	Tallinna Flora I	18	29
7	Elva	18	20
8	Tallinna Augur	18	16
9	Pärnu Vaprus	18	13
10	Rakvere Tarvas & Irbis ÜM (R)	18	8

(C) Champions; (R) Relegated

II liiga
Pos	Team	Pld	Pts
1	Tartu Kalev I (C, P)	18	52
2	Jõhvi Phoenix	18	49
3	Tallinna Legion I	18	35
4	Viimsi MRJK	18	27
5	Kuressaare	18	19
6	Keila	18	19
7	Tabasalu	18	18
8	Tallinna Legion II	18	17
9	Pärnu Poseidon	18	14
10	Loo (R)	18	12

(C) Champions; (P) Promoted; (R) Relegated

III liiga
Pos	Team	Pld	Pts
1	Viljandi Tulevik (C, P)	14	34
2	Läänemaa	14	33
3	Saue	14	29
4	Kohtla-Järve Storm	14	16
5	Pärnu	14	15
6	Tallinna Levadia Valge	14	13
7	Tallinna Kalev	14	8
8	Raplamaa (R)	14	7

(C) Champions; (P) Promoted; (R) Relegated

III liiga
Pos	Team	Pld	Pts
1	Flora II (C, P)	16	36
2	Tulevik & Suure-Jaani ÜM	16	35
3	Tarvastu & Tõrva ÜM	16	29
4	Nõmme Kalju	16	29
5	Kohila Püsivus	16	23
6	Tallinn II	16	20
7	Tartu Helios	16	18
8	Tartu Kalev II	16	9
9	Kohtla-Järve Järve	16	6

(C) Champions; (P) Promoted

=== Futsal ===
==== Coolbet saaliliiga ====
2020 had several team changes in comparison to the previous season. Three clubs changed their names (Tartu Ravens Futsal EMÜ became Tartu Ravens Futsal Ares Security; Sillamäe FC NPM Silmet became Sillamäe FC Molycorp Silmet; Sillamäe JK Dina became Sillamäe Alexela), while relegated Narva Ganza was replaced by Sillamäe Alexela. Additionally, the fourth-placed team of the 2018–19 Esiliiga, Tallinna Augur Enemat, decided against competing in the top tier. Therefore, Tartu Maksimum was spared from relegation and JK Kohila was promoted to the Meistriliiga for the first time.

The main season ended with Viimsi winning firmly and Alexela barely finishing second (fifth-placed Ravens was only a point behind). The other three teams determined the relegated team, which in the end was Molycorp Silmet, who had a worse goal difference than Maksimum. The relegation play-offs were not played between Maksimum and Kadrina because Esiliigas fourth team did not want to get promoted. Also, the final tournament was not finished due to the COVID-19 epidemic. Therefore, Viimsi Smsraha was declared champions. The season's top scorer was Maksimum's Priit Peedo with his 20 goals.

Pos	Team	Pld	W	D	L	GF	GA	GD	Pts	Promotion, qualification or relegation
1	Viimsi Smsraha	14	11	1	2	112	38	+74	34	Championship play-off semifinal
2	Sillamäe Alexela	14	9	1	4	71	56	+15	28	Championship play-off semifinal
3	Narva United	14	9	1	4	76	49	+27	28	Championship play-off quarterfinal
4	Tallinna Cosmos	14	8	3	3	74	48	+26	27	Championship play-off quarterfinal
5	Tartu Ravens Futsal Ares Security	14	9	0	5	74	56	+18	27	Championship play-off quarterfinal
6	Kohila	14	3	0	11	47	83	−36	9	Championship play-off quarterfinal
7	Tartu Maksimum	14	2	0	12	67	119	−52	6	Relegation play-offs
8	Sillamäe Molycorp Silmet (R)	14	2	0	12	45	117	−72	6	Relegation

(R) Relegated
Locations of the 2019-20 Coolbet Saaliliiga teams

Play-off:

Quarterfinal
3	Narva United	9	9	2
6	Kohila	0	3	0
4	Tallinna Cosmos	3 (7)	5	2
5	Tartu Ravens Futsal Ares Security	3 (6)	3	0

Semifinal
Sillamäe Alexela	5	X	X
Narva United	1	X	X
Viimsi Smsraha	7	X	X
Tallinna Cosmos	5	X	X

Final
–––––––––––––	X	X	X
–––––––––––––	X	X	X

Relegation play-off:

Team 1	Agg.	Team 2	1st leg	2nd leg
Tartu Maksimum (Meistriliiga 7th)	+:–	SK Kadrina (Esiliiga 4th)	+:–	+:–

==== Saali Esiliiga ====
In comparison to the 2019 season, only half of the league's teams remained the same. JK Kohila and Sillamäe Alexela were promoted to the Meistriliiga, while Tallinna Maccabi and reigning champions of the Saali Esiliiga, Tallinna FC Cosmos II, decided not to participate in the top three leagues. This saved the 2019 season's last-placed club Sillamäe from relegation, who instead remained in the league. In addition, the league had new entrants in the form of Narva Ganza (relegated from the Meistriliiga) and Kadrina (promoted from the Teine liiga). The final two clubs to participate were the reserve teams of Viimsi Smsraha and Narva United.

In conclusion, Narva United II won its second Esiliiga title with 33 points and Rummu Dünamo finished for the first time as the best independent team. Therefore, they were given the opportunity to replace Sillamäe NPM Silmet, who finished last this season, in the Coolbet Saaliliiga. As Kadrina were the second-best independent team, they were qualified to play promotion play-offs, which they decided not to participate in. On the other side of the league, Narva Ganza, who were in the highest division in 2018, got relegated. In addition, Sillamäe also gave up the opportunity to play relegation play-offs against Rõuge Saunamaa, who was thereby promoted to Esiliiga.

Pos	Team	Pld	W	D	L	GF	GA	GD	Pts	Promotion, qualification or relegation
1	Narva United II (Note: Reserve teams are ineligible for promotion.) (C)	14	11	0	3	104	62	+42	33	
2	Rummu Dünamo (P)	14	8	0	6	118	73	+45	24	Promotion
3	Sillamäe Alexela II	14	7	1	6	85	83	+2	22	Club dissolved
4	Kadrina	14	7	0	7	87	102	−15	21	Promotion play-offs
5	Viimsi Smsraha U19	14	6	0	8	63	106	−43	18	
6	Jõgeva Wolves	14	6	0	8	83	98	−15	18	
7	Sillamäe	14	5	1	8	65	73	−8	16	Club dissolved
8	Narva Ganza	14	5	0	9	90	98	−8	15	Readmitted

Updated to match(es) played on 10 February. Source:
(C) Champions; (P) Promoted
Notes:
Locations of the 2019-20 Saali Esiliiga teams

Relegation play-off:

Team 1	Agg.	Team 2	1st leg	2nd leg
FC Sillamäe (Esiliiga 7th)	–:+	Rõuge Saunamaa (II liiga 2nd)	–:+	–:+

==== Saali Teine liiga ====
The lowest tier of the futsal league system had seven participants in 2020, one less than the previous year. Three clubs remained in the league (Rõuge, Rummu II and Äksi), while four other teams competed in their debut seasons: Aruküla, Otepää, EstNor and Võru Helios.

The season ended with Aruküla Unibox winning each game and therefore being crowned the champions. As a result, they were promoted to the second tier. Rõuge Saunamaa, the team which finished the last two seasons in third place, finished the 2020 season in second and qualified for the promotion play-offs. Both teams secured their places multiple rounds before the end of the season. The league's top scorer was Rauno Randjõe from Aruküla, who scored 31 goals in 11 games.

Pos	Team	Pld	W	D	L	GF	GA	GD	Pts	Promotion, qualification or relegation
1	Aruküla Unibox (C, P)	12	12	0	0	112	26	+86	36	Promotion
2	Rõuge Saunamaa (O, P)	12	8	2	2	132	78	+54	26	Promotion play-offs
3	Äksi Wolves	12	6	0	6	78	98	−20	18	
4	Rantipol Võru Helios	12	5	1	6	94	90	+4	16	
5	Rummu Dünamo II	12	3	1	8	74	121	−47	10	
6	Otepää	12	2	2	8	41	80	−39	8	
7	EstNor Kiili	12	1	4	7	55	93	−38	7	Club dissolved

Updated to match(es) played on 10 February. Source:
(C) Champions; (O) Play-off winners; (P) Promoted
Locations of the 2019-20 Saali Teine liiga teams

==== Women's Saali Meistriliiga ====
The second season of the women's futsal championship had five contestants. As there was no second division, the last-placed team did not get relegated and thus all clubs from the competition's debut season (except for FC RaDina) are taking part. One completely new team joined the league, Tallinna FC Ajax. At first, last season's second-placed team Põltsamaa SK Motiiv decided not to compete. However, prior to the start of the season they merged with Tartu SK 10 Premium and took part in the league.

Pos	Team	Pld	W	D	L	GF	GA	GD	Pts	Promotion, qualification or relegation
1	Pae United	11	11	0	0	142	11	+131	33	Champions
2	Põltsamaa Motiiv 10	12	7	1	4	84	23	+61	22	
3	Nõmme Kalju	11	5	1	5	51	32	+19	16	
4	Tallinna Ajax	11	4	0	7	33	58	−25	12	
5	Kuusalu Kalev	11	0	0	11	13	199	−186	0	

Updated to match(es) played on 5 March. Source:

Rank	Player	Club	Goals
1	(Estonia) Ljubov Maksimova	Pae United	43
2	(Estonia) Margaria Matjuhhova	Pae United	32
3	(Estonia) Gerda Johanna Leichter	Põltsamaa Motiiv	21
4	(Estonia) Samanta Uueda	Põltsamaa Motiiv	16
5	(Estonia) Anna Kulieva	Pae United	15

As of 26 January 2020.

=== Beach football ===
==== Coolbet RannaLiiga — Meistriliiga ====
In 2020 the Estonian FA and Latvian FA decided to merge their top beach football seasons. The league consists of five Estonian teams (last year's top four + Türi) and three Latvian teams. While in the beginning it was decided that there will be more than four rounds and a play-off at the end of the season, then due to the COVID-19 pandemic all teams played each other twice and there was not a final tournament. Three stages were hosted by Sportland Beach Pärnu Arena and one round was played in Jurmala. The best Estonian and Latvian team progressed to the 2021 Euro Winners Cup tournament.

The historic season ended with SK Augur Enemat firmly winning its third title (the first two being in 2013 and 2018). Last season's champion Thunder Arvutitark finished second, eleven points behind the champions. The league's third placed team was also from Estonia - Nõmme Olybet managed to reach the top three for the fourth consecutive season. The best Latvian team was BSC LAT, who placed fourth. After the season, the FA decided to award Kristian Marmor as the league's best player, Sander Lepik as the best goalscorer (20 goals) and Markus Lukk as the best keeper. All winning players represented Augur.

Pos	Team	Pld	W	W+	WP	L	GF	GA	GD	Pts	Qualification
1	(Estonia) Augur Enemat	14	12	1	0	1	89	32	+57	38	2021 Euro Winners Cup
2	(Estonia) Thunder Arvutitark	14	9	0	0	5	60	53	+7	27	
3	(Estonia) Nõmme OlyBet	14	8	0	0	6	70	36	+34	24	
4	(Latvia) LAT	14	6	1	2	5	52	55	−3	22	2021 Euro Winners Cup
5	(Latvia) Ropaži	14	6	0	2	6	43	55	−12	20	
6	(Latvia) Beitar Kauguri	14	5	0	0	9	52	60	−8	15	
7	(Estonia) Üksjalgvärav Elementmaster	14	3	1	0	10	53	75	−22	11	
8	(Estonia) Türi	14	0	0	0	14	36	89	−53	0	

Source: jalgpall.ee

==== Coolbet RannaLiiga — Esiliiga ====
Eight teams were originally supposed to take part of the 2020 Beach football Esiliiga season, but Team Viimsi, who did not show up to the first round, were disqualified. While five of the teams remained the same as last year, then Prokon and Tickmill both made their debuts. Last season's silvermedalists BSC Türi decided to participate in the higher division. The first two rounds were won by All-Stars, who were six points ahead of the second-placed JK Fellin. But the leader was unsuccessful in the following two rounds and therefore they were passed by eventual winners Chromotex and Schötlli. Consequently, Chromotex won their second title in a row, while Schötlli were awarded their first medal. The best player of the season was Aleksander Frischer, the best goalkeeper was Kalev Moppel (both Chromotex) and the best goalscorer was Jaagup Luhakooder (Schöttli).

Pos	Club	04.07	18.07	26.07	17.08	Ranking pts	W	W+	Wp	L	Table pts	All pts
1	BSC Chromtex	5	2	1	1	42	5	1	0	3	17	59
2	Schöttli Keskkonnatehnika	4	6	2	2	34	6	1	0	2	20	54
3	All-Stars	1	1	3	5	41	4	0	0	5	12	53
4	Prokon	3	5	5	3	30	6	0	0	4	18	48
5	JK Fellin	2	3	4	4	33	4	1	0	5	14	47
6	Tickmill/Kadrina Maadlejad	6	4	6	6	18	4	1	0	7	14	32
7	Ärilaen	7	7	7	7	13	1	1	0	10	4	17
8	Team Viimsi (DSQ)	8	8	8	8	0	0	0	0	0	0	0

== Cup competitions ==
=== Tipneri karikavõistlused ===
Quarterfinals
1	Nõmme Kalju	1
1	Narva Trans	2
3	Võru Helios	0
1	Tallinna Kalev	6
2	Elva	3
4	Kohtla-Järve Järve U21	1
1	Tartu Tammeka	0
1	Tallinna Flora	3

Semifinals
1	Narva Trans	4
1	Tallinna Kalev	1
2	Elva	2
1	Tallinna Flora	4

Final
1	Narva Trans	1
1	Tallinna Flora	2

Home teams listed on top of bracket. (AET): At Extra Time

=== Small Cup ===
Quarterfinals
5	Saku Sporting	0
5	Tallinna Zenit	2
5	Tallinna Zapoos	0
5	Otepää	4
4	Paide Linnameeskond III	4
4	Harju Laagri	2
4	Tallinna Legion II (4)	1
4	Põhja-Tallinna Volta (3)	1

Semifinals
5	Tallinna Zenit	2
5	Otepää	0
4	Paide Linnameeskond III	2
4	Tallinna Legion II	7

Final
5	Tallinna Zenit	2
4	Tallinna Legion II	3

Home teams listed on top of bracket. (AET): At Extra Time

=== Women's Cup ===
Quarterfinals
2	Tallinna Legion	0
2	Tallinna Flora II	2
1	Pärnu	X
1	Tallinna Flora	X
1	Pärnu Vaprus (2)	2
1	Tallinna Kalev (4)	2
1	Saku Sporting	12
1	Nõmme Kalju	0

Semifinals
2	Tallinna Flora II	0
1	Tallinna Flora	11
1	Tallinna Kalev	2
1	Saku Sporting	1

Final
1	Tallinna Flora	6
1	Tallinna Kalev	0

Home teams listed on top of bracket. (AET): At Extra Time

- Flora got a bye from the quarterfinals, because Pärnu announced that they will not compete in the 2020 season.

=== Futsal's Cup ===
In 2019 both Võru Helios and Tartu Ravens reached the semifinals for the first time. In the final, title holders Viimsi Smsraha defeated Tallinna Cosmos in front of 277 people. The Futsal Cup's top scorer was Rummu Dünamo's Dmitri Sui with 11 goals.

Quarterfinals
2	Rummu Dünamo	4
1	Viimsi Smsraha	14
1	Tartu Maksimum	1
3	Rantipol Võru Helios	3
1	Narva United	2
1	Tartu Ravens F.A.S.	4
1	Sillamäe NPM Silmet	3
1	Tallinna Cosmos	7

Semifinals
1	Viimsi Smsraha	7
3	Rantipol Võru Helios	1
1	Tartu Ravens F.A.S.	2
1	Tallinna Cosmos	6

Final
1	Viimsi Smsraha	3
1	Tallinna Cosmos	2

Home teams listed on top of bracket. (AET): At Extra Time

=== Supercups ===
23 October 2019 Futsal's Supercup	Viimsi Smsraha	5–6	Tallinna Cosmos	Tallinn
19:30	Edwin Stüf 25', 29'; Artur Bõstrov 30'; Oleksandr Sorokin 38'; Ervin Stüf 40'	Report	Pavel Rubel 38', 39', 39'; Nikita Tšernei 7'; Marek Naal 23'; Jevgeni Skamnitski 38'	Stadium: Kristiine Spordihall; Attendance: 137; Referee: Grigori Ošomkov, Andres Jahimaa

1 March 2020 Men's Supercup	Tallinna Flora	2–0	Narva Trans	Narva
13:00	Sappinen 6'; Alliku 83' (yellow card) 87'	Report	Polyakov (yellow card) 35'; Elysée (yellow card) 42' (yellow-red card) 75'; Sobtšenko (yellow card) 77'; Škinjov (yellow card) 79'	Stadium: Kalev-FAMA stadium Attendance: 681; Referee: Roomer Tarajev

23 May 2020 Women's Supercup	Tallinna Flora	5–1	Tallinna Kalev	Tallinn
19:00	Lillemäe 12'; Saulep 18'; Tullus 22'; Loo 36'; Läänmäe 66'	Report	Treiberg 88'	Stadium: A. le Coq Arena; Attendance: 0 Referee: Reelika Turi

21 June 2020 Beach Football's Supercup	Augur Enemat	6–4	Thunder Arvutitark	Tallinn
	Nõmmiko 2', 9'; Munskind 8', 31'; Kuuse 24'; Marmor 32'	Report	Stüf 8'; Titenok 11'; Sooaluste 15'; Remmelgas (?)	Stadium: Haven Kakumäe

== County Competition ==
The Estonian County Competition is a league-type competition, where teams from all 15 counties (plus a team from the capital Tallinn) compete to win the title. The competition lasts for 30 years, and each year every team plays only one game. This season's games were postponed due to the COVID-19 pandemic.

== European competitions ==
FC Flora

19 August 2020 Champions League Q1	Flora (Estonia)	1–1 (a.e.t.) (2–4 p)	(Lithuania) Sūduva	A. Le Coq Arena, Tallinn
18:30 (19:30 EEST)	Sappinen 49'	Report	Topčagić 78' (pen.)	Attendance: 0 Referee: Nejc Kajtazović (Slovenia)
	Penalties
	Vassiljev (penalty missed); Sappinen (penalty scored); Järvelaid (penalty scored); Soomets (penalty missed)		(penalty scored) Švrljuga; (penalty scored) Šabala; (penalty missed) Tadić; (penalty scored) Pušić; (penalty scored) Topčagić

17 September 2020 Europa League Q2	Flora (Estonia)	2–1	(Iceland) KR	A. Le Coq Arena, Tallinn
18:30 (19:30 EEST)	Sappinen 7'; Lilander 37'	Report	Finnbogason 75'	Attendance: 0 Referee: Sigurd Kringstad (Norway)

24 September 2020 Europa League Q3	Floriana (Malta)	0–0 (a.e.t.) (2–4 p)	(Estonia) Flora	National Stadium, Ta' Qali
19:00		Report		Attendance: 0 Referee: Irfan Peljto (Bosnia and Herzegovina)
	Penalties
	Keqi (penalty missed); Venancio (penalty missed); Adan (penalty scored); Busuttil (penalty scored)		(penalty scored) Lilander; (penalty scored) Kreida; (penalty missed) Poom; (penalty scored) Kuusk; (penalty scored) Liivak

1 October 2020 Europa League play-off	Dinamo Zagreb (Croatia)	3–1	(Estonia) Flora	Stadion Maksimir, Zagreb
19:00	Gavranović 11'; Ademi 26', 87'	Report	Sinyavskiy 65'	Attendance: 0 Referee: Ali Palabıyık (Turkey)

FCI Levadia

27 August 2020 Europa League Q1	B36 Tórshavn (Faroe Islands)	4–3 (a.e.t.)	(Estonia) FCI Levadia	Tórsvøllur, Tórshavn (Note: B36 Tórshavn will play their home match against FCI Levadia at Tórsvøllur, Tórshavn, instead of their regular stadium Gundadalur, Tórshavn, which did not meet UEFA requirements.)
20:00 (19:00 WEST)	Pingel 72', 76'; Samuelsen 107'; Agnarsson 113'	Report	Õigus 52'; Elhi 79'; Manucho 101'	Attendance: 0 Referee: Paul McLaughlin (Republic of Ireland)

Nõmme Kalju

10 September 2020 Europa League Q1	Nõmme Kalju (Estonia)	0–4 (Note: The first qualifying round match between Nõmme Kalju and Mura, originally scheduled to be played on 27 August 2020, 16:30 CEST, at Kadriorg Stadium, Tallinn, was postponed, due to one player from Nõmme Kalju and one player from Mura testing positive for SARS-2 coronavirus, after Meistriliiga and Slovenian PrvaLiga matches on 22 August respectively, and both whole teams being put into quarantine by the Estonian authorities.)	(Slovenia) Mura	Szusza Ferenc Stadion, Budapest
19:30		Report	Žižek 17', 27'; Kous 32'; Kozar 36'	Attendance: 0 Referee: Robert Hennessy (Republic of Ireland)

Paide Linnameeskond

27 August 2020 Europa League Q1	Žalgiris (Lithuania)	2–0	(Estonia) Paide Linnameeskond	LFF Stadium, Vilnius
19:00 (20:00 EEST)	Kaluđerović 9'; Antal 32'	Report		Attendance: 0 Referee: Petri Viljanen (Finland)

Rankings

Team	Table	Jan	Feb	Mar	Apr	May	Jun	Jul	Aug	Sep	Oct	Nov	Dec	Number of teams
Men's team	FIFA Rankings	103	104							108	109			210
Men's team	UEFA Rankings	51												55
Women's team	FIFA Rankings	94		95										159
Women's team	UEFA Rankings	36												50
Nõmme Kalju (men)	UEFA Rankings^{1}	105												200
Flora (men)	UEFA Rankings^{1}	143												200
Flora (women)	UEFA Rankings^{1}	51												62
Flora (women)	UEFA Rankings^{2}	76												113
Pärnu (women)	UEFA Rankings^{2}	91												113

^{1}Based on last seasons performances.
^{2}Based on last five seasons performances.

== Notable transfers ==
This list contains the most important player transfers related to the Estonian league system or the national team in the year 2020.

=== Inside Meistriliiga ===
- (Estonia) Robert Kirss, 25–26, FW, from (Estonia) Nõmme Kalju to (Estonia) Levadia. 21 November
- (Estonia) Trevor Elhi, 26–27, DF, from (Finland) SJK to (Estonia) Levadia. 22 November
- (Estonia) Marko Meerits, 27–28, GK, from (Estonia) Narva Trans to (Estonia) Nõmme Kalju. 25 November
- (Estonia) Pavel Londak, 39–40, GK, from (Estonia) Nõmme Kalju to (Estonia) Legion. 5 December
- (Estonia) Joseph Saliste, 24–25, MF, from (Estonia) Flora to (Estonia) Paide Linnameeskond. 6 December
- (Estonia) Pavel Marin, 24–25, MF, from (Estonia) Levadia to (Estonia) Viljandi Tulevik. 10 December
- (Estonia) Sören Kaldma, 23–24, MF, from (Estonia) Paide Linnameeskond to (Estonia) Tallinna Kalev. 17 December
- (Estonia) Sergei Mošnikov, 32–33, MF, from (Lithuania) Palanga to (Estonia) Paide Linnameeskond. 13 January
- (Estonia) Brent Lepistu, 26–27, MF, from (Finland) Lahti to (Estonia) Levadia. 16 January
- (Estonia) Markus Soomets, 19–20, MF, from (Italy) Rende Calcio to (Estonia) Flora. 17 January
- (Estonia) Maksim Gussev, 25–26, FW, from (Estonia) Flora to (Estonia) Legion. 19 January
- (Estonia) Marek Kaljumäe, 28–29, DF, from (Estonia) Levadia to (Estonia) Tallinna Kalev. 31 January
- (Estonia) Andreas Raudsepp, 26–27, MF, from (Estonia) Tallinna Kalev to (Estonia) Nõmme Kalju. 2 February
- (Estonia) Artjom Artjunin, 29–30, DF, from (Bulgaria) Etar Veliko Tarnovo to (Estonia) Legion. 8 February
- (Estonia) Andreas Vaikla, 22–23, GK, from (Sweden) Norrköping to (Estonia) Narva Trans. 17 February
- (Estonia) Aleksandr Dmitrijev, 37–38, MF, from free agent to (Estonia) Legion. 29 May
- (Estonia) Matvei Igonen, 23–24, GK, from (Norway) Lillestrom to (Estonia) Flora. 22 July
- (Estonia) Albert Prosa, 29–30, FW, from free agent to (Estonia) Legion. 26 July
- (Estonia) Ken Kallaste, 31–32, DF, from (Poland) Tychy to (Estonia) Flora. 27 July
- (Estonia) Sören Kaldma, 23–24, MF, from (Estonia) Tallinna Kalev to (Estonia) Kuressaare. 28 July
- (Estonia) Henri Anier, 29–30, FW, from (Netherlands) Go Ahead Eagles to (Estonia) Paide Linnameeskond. 14 August

=== Outside Meistriliiga ===
- (Estonia) Erik Sorga, 20–21, FW, from (Estonia) Flora to (United States) D.C. United. 8 January
- (Estonia) Oliver Jürgens, 16–17, FW, from (Italy) Hellas Verona Youth to (Italy) AS Roma Youth. 21 January
- (Estonia) Joonas Tamm, 27–28, DF, from (Estonia) Flora to (Ukraine) Desna Chernihiv. 24 January
- (Estonia) Henri Anier, 29–30, FW, from (South Korea) Suwon to (Netherlands) Go Ahead Eagles. 1 February
- (Estonia) Henrik Ojamaa, 28–29, FW, from (Poland) Miedz Legnica to (Poland) Widzew Lodz. 1 February
- (Estonia) Mihkel Ainsalu, 23–24, MF, from (Estonia) Flora to (Ukraine) Lviv. 18 August
- (Estonia) Henri Järvelaid, 21–22, DF, from (Estonia) Flora to (Denmark) Vendsyssel. 24 August
- (Estonia) Martin Vetkal, 16–17, MF, from (Estonia) Tallinna Kalev to (Italy) AS Roma Youth. 26 August
- (Estonia) Kristofer Piht, 18–19, FW, from (Estonia) Flora to (Italy) S.P.A.L. Youth. 15 September
- (Estonia) Oliver Jürgens, 16–17, FW, from (Italy) AS Roma Youth to (Italy) Inter Milan Youth. 21 September
- (Estonia) Maksim Paskotši, 16–17, DF, from (Estonia) Flora to (England) Tottenham Youth. 21 September

=== Foreign players ===
- (Ivory Coast) Manucho, 29–30, FW, from (Latvia) Liepaja to (Estonia) Levadia. 9 December
- (Uganda) Edrisa Lubega, 21–22, FW, from (Uganda) Proline to (Estonia) Paide Linnameeskond. 13 December
- (Russia) Nikita Andreev, 31–32, FW, from (Estonia) Levadia to (Spain) Intercity. 5 January
- (Ukraine) Zurab Ochihava, 24–25, DF, from (Ukraine) Vorskla Poltava to (Estonia) Levadia. 14 January
- (United States) Eric McWoods, 24–25, FW, from (Estonia) Narva Trans to (Hungary) Zalaegerszegi. 15 January
- (Russia) Evgeny Osipov, 33–34, DF, from (Estonia) Levadia to (Armenia) Urartu. 16 January
- (Lithuania) Markas Beneta, 26–27, DF, from (Estonia) Narva Trans to (Poland) Zagłębie Sosnowiec. 22 January
- (Ivory Coast) Yann Michael Yao, 22–23, FW, from (Estonia) Paide Linnameeskond to (Slovakia) Spartak Trnava. 23 January
- (Ukraine) Oleksandr Safronov, 20–21, DF, from (Ukraine) Dnipro-1 to (Estonia) Levadia.^{1} 28 January
- (Ghana) Ofosu Appiah, 30–31, DF, from (Latvia) Valmieras to (Estonia) Narva Trans. 31 January
- (Finland) Anselmi Nurmela, 23–24, DF, from (Estonia) Flora to (Finland) Oulu. 1 February
- (Ukraine) Yuriy Kolomoyets, 29–30, FW, from (Ukraine) Vorskla Poltava to (Estonia) Levadia. 8 February
- (Russia) Amir Natkho, 23–24, MF, from (Russia) Yevpatoriya to (Estonia) Nõmme Kalju. 10 February
- (Brazil) Pedro Victor, 26–27, DF, from (Malaysia) PKNP to (Estonia) Nõmme Kalju. 14 February
- (Azerbaijan) Nurlan Novruzov, 26–27, MF, from (Moldova) Dinamo-Auto Tiraspol to (Estonia) Narva Trans. 21 February
- (Mali) Sadio Tounkara, 27–28, MF, free agent to (Estonia) Narva Trans. 27 February
- (Ukraine) Yuriy Tkachuk, 24–25, MF, from (Estonia) Levadia to free agent. 8 May
- (Russia) Nikita Andreev, 31–32, FW, from (Spain) Intercity to (Estonia) Legion. 30 July
- (Slovenia) Dominik Ivkič, 22–23, DF, from (Slovenia) Fužinar to (Estonia) Kalev. 5 August

^{1} Returned to parent club on 23 July.

=== Retired players ===
- (Estonia) Madis Vihmann, 24–25, DF, Flora, unknown.
- (Estonia) Gert Kams, 34–35, DF, Flora, sporting director at Paide Linnameeskond.
- (Estonia) Tarmo Neemelo, 37–38, FW, Paide Linnameeskond, manager at Nõmme Kalju U21.
- (Estonia) Sergei Lepmets, 32–33, GK, Levadia, started playing as an amateur player.

== See also ==
- Winter transfers 2019–20
- Winter tournament 2020
- Meistriliiga 2020
- Esiliiga 2020
- Esiliiga B 2020
- II liiga 2020
- Estonian Cup 2019-20
- Estonian Cup 2020
