= List of Estonian football transfers winter 2019–20 =

This is a list of Estonian football transfers in the winter transfer window 2019–20 by club.

This transfer window was open between the 2019 Meistriliiga and the 2020 Meistriliiga season. 1 club has changed: Tallinna JK Legion joins Estonian top division, Maardu Linnameeskond was relegated.

== Meistriliiga ==
=== Flora Tallinn ===
In:

No.	Pos.	Nation	Player
1	GK	(Estonia) EST	Ingmar Krister Paplavskis (loan return from Viljandi JK Tulevik)
11	FW	(Estonia) EST	Rauno Sappinen (loan return from (Slovenia) NK Domžale)
23	MF	(Estonia) EST	Henri Välja (from Paide Linnameeskond)
26	DF	(Estonia) EST	Kristo Hussar (on loan from JK Tabasalu)
28	MF	(Estonia) EST	Markus Soomets (from (Italy) Rende Calcio 1968)

Out:

No.	Pos.	Nation	Player
16	DF	(Finland) FIN	Anselmi Mikael Nurmela (to (Finland) AC Oulu)
17	DF	(Estonia) EST	Marco Lukka (to FC Kuressaare)
19	DF	(Estonia) EST	Gert Kams (retired)
32	GK	(Estonia) EST	Matvei Igonen (loan return to (Norway) Lillestrøm SK)
50	FW	(Estonia) EST	Erik Sorga (to (United States) D.C. United)
72	MF	(Estonia) EST	Herol Riiberg (on loan to Viljandi JK Tulevik)
–	DF	(Estonia) EST	Joonas Tamm (to (Ukraine) FC Desna Chernihiv)
–	DF	(Estonia) EST	Kevin Aloe (to Tartu JK Tammeka)
–	FW	(Estonia) EST	Maksim Gussev (to TJK Legion)
–	GK	(Estonia) EST	Magnus Karofeld (to FC Kuressaare)
–	MF	(Estonia) EST	Joseph Saliste (to Paide Linnameeskond)
–	MF	(Estonia) EST	German Šlein (to TJK Legion)
–	MF	(Estonia) EST	Zakaria Beglarishvili (to (Finland) Kotkan TP)
–	MF	(Estonia) EST	Nikita Komissarov (to Viljandi JK Tulevik)

=== FCI Levadia ===
In:

No.	Pos.	Nation	Player
3	DF	(Ukraine) UKR	Zurab Ochihava (from (Ukraine) FC Vorskla Poltava)
4	DF	(Ukraine) UKR	Oleksandr Safronov (from (Ukraine) SC Dnipro-1)
7	MF	(Estonia) EST	Brent Lepistu (from (Finland) FC Lahti)
11	FW	(Ivory Coast) CIV	Manucho (from (Latvia) FK Liepāja)
17	MF	(Estonia) EST	Robert Kirss (from Nõmme Kalju FC)
22	DF	(Estonia) EST	Trevor Elhi (from (Finland) SJK Seinäjoki)
26	FW	(Ukraine) UKR	Yuriy Kolomoyets (from (Ukraine) FC Vorskla Poltava)

Out:

No.	Pos.	Nation	Player
7	MF	(Brazil) BRA	Joao Morelli (to (Canada) HFX Wanderers FC)
11	FW	(Russia) RUS	Kirill Nesterov (to TJK Legion)
19	DF	(Russia) RUS	Yevgeni Osipov (to (Armenia) FC Urartu)
20	FW	(Colombia) COL	Erick Moreno (contract ended)
21	FW	(Russia) RUS	Nikita Andreev (to (Spain) CF Intercity)
23	DF	(Russia) RUS	Igor Dudarev (to Tartu JK Tammeka)
26	MF	(Estonia) EST	Marek Kaljumäe (to JK Tallinna Kalev)
37	MF	(Estonia) EST	Pavel Marin (to Viljandi JK Tulevik)

=== Nõmme Kalju ===
In:

No.	Pos.	Nation	Player
1	GK	(Estonia) EST	Marko Meerits (from JK Narva Trans)
7	MF	(Russia) RUS	Amir Natkho (from Yevpatoriya)
22	FW	(Estonia) EST	Kaarel Usta (from (Finland) MYPA)
23	DF	(Brazil) BRA	Pedro Victor (from (Malaysia) PKNP F.C.)
77	MF	(Estonia) EST	Andreas Raudsepp (from JK Tallinna Kalev)
90	FW	(Brazil) BRA	Odilavio da Silva (from (Brazil) Náutico Futebol Clube)
–	DF	(Ukraine) UKR	Vladislav Veremeev (from (Ukraine) PFC Sumy)

Out:

No.	Pos.	Nation	Player
1	GK	(Estonia) EST	Vitali Teleš (to Maardu Linnameeskond)
7	MF	(France) FRA	Reginald Mbu Alidor (contract ended)
9	MF	(Estonia) EST	Nikolay Mashichev (to TJK Legion)
17	MF	(Estonia) EST	Robert Kirss (to FCI Levadia)
18	MF	(Estonia) EST	Roman Sobtšenko (to JK Narva Trans)
19	DF	(Estonia) EST	Aleksandr Ivanjušin (on loan to JK Narva Trans)
96	GK	(Estonia) EST	Pavel Londak (to TJK Legion)
99	FW	(New Zealand) NZL	Max Mata (loan return to (Switzerland) Grasshoppers FC)

=== Paide Linnameeskond ===
In:

No.	Pos.	Nation	Player
7	FW	(Uganda) UGA	Edrisa Lubega (from (Uganda) Proline)
11	FW	(Mali) MLI	Hadji Drame (from (Mali) Yeelen Olympique)
16	MF	(Estonia) EST	Sergei Mošnikov (from (Lithuania) FK Palanga)
18	DF	(Estonia) EST	Kristjan Kurim (from Nõmme Kalju FC U21)
29	MF	(Estonia) EST	Joseph Saliste (from FC Flora)
35	GK	(Estonia) EST	Rene Merilo (loan return from Kohtla-Järve JK Järve)
80	MF	(Estonia) EST	Kevor Palumets (from JK Tabasalu)

Out:

No.	Pos.	Nation	Player
7	FW	(The Gambia) GAM	Patrick Sylva (contract terminated)
11	MF	(Ivory Coast) CIV	Yann Michaél Yao (to (Slovakia) FC Spartak Trnava)
16	DF	(Estonia) EST	Tanel Neubauer (to FC Kuressaare)
18	MF	(Estonia) EST	Sören Kaldma (to JK Tallinna Kalev)
23	MF	(Estonia) EST	Henri Välja (to FC Flora)
99	FW	(Estonia) EST	Tarmo Neemelo (retired)
–	GK	(Estonia) EST	Kaarel Rumberg (to JK Tabasalu)

=== Tartu Tammeka ===
In:

No.	Pos.	Nation	Player
5	DF	(Estonia) EST	Kevin Aloe (from FC Flora)
23	DF	(Russia) RUS	Igor Dudarev (from FCI Levadia)

Out:

No.	Pos.	Nation	Player
4	DF	(Finland) FIN	Akim Sairinen (to (Norway) Florø SK)
14	DF	(Nigeria) NGA	Frankline Okoye (to (Finland) IFK Mariehamn)
17	MF	(Estonia) EST	Sander Kapper (to Viljandi JK Tulevik)
99	FW	(Estonia) EST	Albert Prosa (contract ended)

=== Narva Trans ===
In:

No.	Pos.	Nation	Player
1	GK	(Estonia) EST	Andreas Vaikla (from (Sweden) IFK Norrköping)
4	DF	(Estonia) EST	Aleksandr Ivanjušin (on loan from Nõmme Kalju FC)
7	MF	(Azerbaijan) AZE	Nurlan Novruzov (from (Moldova) FC Dinamo-Auto Tiraspol)
8	MF	(Mali) MLI	Sadio Tounkara (free agent)
9	FW	(Estonia) EST	Raivo Saar (from Kohtla-Järve JK Järve)
12	DF	(Ghana) GHA	Ofosu Appiah (from (Latvia) Valmieras FK)
18	MF	(Estonia) EST	Roman Sobtšenko (from Nõmme Kalju FC)
23	DF	(Estonia) EST	Martin Käos (on loan from FCI Levadia)
99	FW	(Nigeria) NGA	Geoffrey Chinedu (on loan from (Ukraine) FC Olimpik Donetsk)

Out:

No.	Pos.	Nation	Player
1	GK	(Estonia) EST	Marko Meerits (to Nõmme Kalju FC)
7	MF	(Lithuania) LTU	Julius Kasparavicius (to (Lithuania) FK Banga Gargždai)
8	DF	(Lithuania) LTU	Markas Beneta (to (Poland) Zaglebie Sosnowiec)
9	FW	(United States) USA	Eric McWoods (to (Hungary) Zalaegerszegi TE)
18	DF	(Estonia) EST	Vadim Mihhailov (on loan to Maardu Linnameeskond)
22	DF	(Estonia) EST	Tanel Tamberg (to JK Tallinna Kalev)
23	DF	(Estonia) EST	Artjom Davõdov (contract ended)
27	MF	(Estonia) EST	Joseph Saliste (loan return to FC Flora)
99	FW	(Estonia) EST	Eduard Golovljov (to JK Tallinna Kalev)
–	FW	(Ukraine) UKR	Juri Holubka (contract terminated after a few months)

=== Viljandi Tulevik ===
In:

No.	Pos.	Nation	Player
5	DF	(Austria) AUT	Marco Budic (from JK Tabasalu)
8	MF	(Estonia) EST	Herol Riiberg (on loan from FC Flora)
10	MF	(Estonia) EST	Nikita Komissarov (from FC Flora)
17	MF	(Estonia) EST	Sander Kapper (from Tartu JK Tammeka)
27	MF	(Canada) CAN	Jude Barrow (from (Canada) Rita's Vancouver SC)
79	MF	(Estonia) EST	Pavel Marin (from FCI Levadia)
99	GK	(Estonia) EST	Matheas Madik (from FC Flora U21)
–	DF	(Poland) POL	Jeremiah Dabrowski (from (Finland) Vaasan Palloseura)
–	MF	(Senegal) SEN	Galaye Gueye (from (Senegal) Jamono Fatick)
–	FW	(Benin) BEN	Jonas Tossou (from (Benin) Alodo Sports)

Out:

No.	Pos.	Nation	Player
2	MF	(Estonia) EST	Kaur Tomson (retired)
3	DF	(Nigeria) NGA	Ridwan Babatunde (to (Portugal) Leixões S.C.)
4	FW	(Estonia) EST	Indrek Ilves (retired)
5	DF	(Estonia) EST	Janar Õunap (retired)
7	FW	(Benin) BEN	Romeo Da-Costa (contract ended)
10	FW	(Nigeria) NGA	David Onyeanula (to (Malta) Mosta F.C.)
17	FW	(Estonia) EST	Rainer Peips (on loan to Vändra JK Vaprus)
21	GK	(Estonia) EST	Ingmar Krister Paplavskis (loan return to FC Flora)
70	MF	(Estonia) EST	Vladislav Zanfirov (loan return to FCI Levadia)

=== JK Tallinna Kalev ===
In:

No.	Pos.	Nation	Player
6	MF	(Estonia) EST	Sören Kaldma (from Paide Linnameeskond)
20	FW	(Morocco) MAR	Selim El Aabchi (from JK Tallinna Kalev III)
26	MF	(Estonia) EST	Marek Kaljumäe (from FCI Levadia)
27	DF	(Estonia) EST	Alger Džumadil (from Maardu Linnameeskond)
29	DF	(Estonia) EST	Tanel Tamberg (from JK Narva Trans)
77	FW	(Estonia) EST	Eduard Golovljov (from JK Narva Trans)
–	MF	(Estonia) EST	Taavi Kala (from Raplamaa JK)

Out:

No.	Pos.	Nation	Player
11	FW	(Nigeria) NGA	Wale Musa Alli (to (Austria) SKU Amstetten)
13	DF	(Estonia) EST	Deniss Maksimenko (on loan to Maardu Linnameeskond)
18	DF	(Bermuda) BER	Roger Lee (contract ended)
27	MF	(Estonia) EST	Andreas Raudsepp (to Nõmme Kalju FC)
28	FW	(Estonia) EST	Kevin Rääbis (to (Germany) SV Donaustauf)
33	DF	(Finland) FIN	Bangaly Kouyaté (to (Belgium) UR La Louvière Centre)
–	FW	(Benin) BEN	Watson Fabrice Hounkpe (left the club)

=== Kuressaare ===
In:

No.	Pos.	Nation	Player
1	GK	(Estonia) EST	Magnus Karofeld (from Flora)
2	DF	(Estonia) EST	Michael Schjønning-Larsen (from Flora U21)
19	MF	(Estonia) EST	Daniel Tuhkanen (from Flora U21)
21	DF	(Estonia) EST	Marco Lukka (from Flora)
28	DF	(Estonia) EST	Tanel Neubauer (from Paide LM)
69	MF	(Estonia) EST	Nevil Krimm (from Nõmme Kalju U21)

Out:

No.	Pos.	Nation	Player
19	MF	(Estonia) EST	Nikita Komissarov (loan return to Flora)
46	FW	(Estonia) EST	Otto-Robert Lipp (loan return to Flora)

=== Tallinna JK Legion ===
In:

No.	Pos.	Nation	Player
5	DF	(Estonia) EST	Artjom Artjunin (from (Bulgaria) SFC Etar Veliko Tarnovo)
6	MF	(Estonia) EST	German Šlein (from FC Flora)
18	MF	(Russia) RUS	Kirill Nesterov (from FCI Levadia)
19	FW	(Estonia) EST	Maksim Gussev (from FC Flora)
33	MF	(Estonia) EST	Nikolay Mashitchev (from Nõmme Kalju FC)
35	GK	(Russia) RUS	Artjom Levizi (from Rakvere JK Tarvas)
39	GK	(Estonia) EST	Pavel Londak (from Nõmme Kalju FC)

Out:

No.	Pos.	Nation	Player
14	MF	(Estonia) EST	Stanislav Goldberg (left club)
18	MF	(Estonia) EST	Maksim Babjak (to Võru FC Helios)
25	MF	(Estonia) EST	Sergei Bilinski (unknown)
33	DF	(Estonia) EST	Sergei Paništšev (to FCI Levadia U21)
87	FW	(Russia) RUS	Roman Grigorevskiy (to Kohtla-Järve JK Järve)

== Esiliiga ==
=== FC Nõmme United ===
In:

No.	Pos.	Nation	Player
—	MF	(Estonia) EST	Kevin Koppel (from Saue JK)

Out:

No.	Pos.	Nation	Player
5	DF	(Estonia) EST	Teet Kallaste (left the club)
8	FW	(Nigeria) NGA	Temitayo Doherty (left the club)
10	FW	(Estonia) EST	Mark Kolosov (left the club)
27	FW	(Estonia) EST	Taavi Laurits (to Vändra JK Vaprus)

=== Vändra JK Vaprus ===
In:

No.	Pos.	Nation	Player
—	MF	(Estonia) EST	Envar Lauter (from Pärnu JK Vaprus)
—	MF	(Estonia) EST	Kaarel Kaarlimäe (from Põhja-Tallinna JK Volta)
—	FW	(Estonia) EST	Taavi Laurits (from FC Nõmme United)
—	FW	(Estonia) EST	Rainer Peips (on loan from Viljandi JK Tulevik)
—	FW	(Estonia) EST	Germo Pärnik (from Pärnu JK Vaprus)

Out:

No.	Pos.	Nation	Player

=== Pärnu Jalgpalliklubi ===
In:

No.	Pos.	Nation	Player

Out:

No.	Pos.	Nation	Player
9	MF	(Estonia) EST	Aleksander Algo (started working as the media chief)
26	MF	(Estonia) EST	Ranet Ristikivi (to Pärnu JK Vaprus)
