= 2020 Meistriliiga =

29th season of the Meistriliiga

Meistriliiga
- Season: 2020
- Dates: 6 March – 8 March; 19 May – 6 December
- Champions: Flora; 13th title
- Relegated: Tallinna Kalev
- Champions League: Flora
- Europa Conference League: Paide Linnameeskond; FCI Levadia (via Estonian Cup)
- Matches: 147
- Goals: 442 (3.01 per match)
- Top goalscorer: Rauno Sappinen (26 goals)
- Biggest home win: Tulevik 5–0 Kuressaare (7 June 2020)
- Biggest away win: Kalev 1–8 Paide (7 March 2020)
- Highest scoring: Paide 7–4 Nõmme Kalju (6 December 2020)

The 2020 Meistriliiga (known as A. Le Coq Premium Liiga for sponsorship reasons) was the 30th season of the Meistriliiga, the top Estonian league for association football clubs. The season began on 6 March 2020, but was suspended after the first round due to the COVID-19 pandemic. The league continued on 19 May 2020. The season concluded on 6 December, with the last match between Flora and FCI Levadia cancelled due to COVID-19 cases in both teams. The defending champions Flora successfully defended their title, winning second title in a row and their 13th in total.

== Teams ==
Ten teams competed in the league, nine sides from the 2019 season and 2019 Esiliiga champions TJK Legion. Legion made their debut in the top tier after consecutive promotions from fourth tier in three seasons. Maardu Linnameeskond were relegated at the end of the 2019 season after finishing in the bottom of the table. Kuressaare retained their Meistriliiga spot after winning a relegation play-off against Esiliiga runners-up Vaprus.

=== Venues ===
Locations of the 2020 Meistriliiga teams

Team	Location	Stadium	Capacity
FCI Levadia	Tallinn	A. Le Coq Arena	14,336
Flora	Tallinn	A. Le Coq Arena	14,336
Kuressaare	Kuressaare	Kuressaare linnastaadion	1,000
Legion	Tallinn	Kadriorg Stadium	5,000
Narva Trans	Narva	Narva Kreenholm Stadium	1,065
Nõmme Kalju	Tallinn	Hiiu Stadium	650
Paide Linnameeskond	Paide	Paide linnastaadion	268
Tallinna Kalev	Tallinn	Kadriorg Stadium	5,000
Tammeka	Tartu	Tartu Tamme Stadium	1,500
Tulevik	Viljandi	Viljandi linnastaadion	1,084

=== Personnel and kits ===
Team	Manager	Captain	Kit manufacturer	Shirt sponsor
FCI Levadia	(Estonia) Vladimir Vassiljev	(Estonia) Dmitri Kruglov	Adidas	Viimsi Keevitus
Flora	(Estonia) Jürgen Henn	(Estonia) Konstantin Vassiljev	Nike	Tele2
Kuressaare	(Ukraine) Roman Kozhukhovskyi	(Estonia) Märten Pajunurm	Nike	
Legion	(Estonia) Denis Belov	(Estonia) Denis Vnukov	Uhlsport	
Narva Trans	(Estonia) Oleg Kurotškin	(Estonia) Roman Nesterovski	Nike	Sportland
Nõmme Kalju	(Estonia) Marko Kristal	(Estonia) Igor Subbotin	Adidas	Paf
Paide Linnameeskond	(Estonia) Vjatšeslav Zahovaiko	(Estonia) Andre Frolov	Nike	Verston
Tallinna Kalev	(Latvia) Dmitrijs Kalašņikovs	(Estonia) Marek Kaljumäe	Macron	Coolbet
Tammeka	(Estonia) Kaido Koppel	(Estonia) Tauno Tekko	Nike	Metec
Tulevik	(Estonia) Sander Post	(Estonia) Kaimar Saag	Joma	Espak

=== Managerial changes ===
Team	Outgoing manager	Manner of departure	Date of vacancy	Position in table	Incoming manager	Date of appointment
FCI Levadia	(Estonia) Vladimir Vassiljev	End of caretaker spell	11 November 2019	Pre-season	(Estonia) Martin Reim	11 November 2019
Narva Trans	(Estonia) Oleg Kurotškin	End of caretaker spell	15 November 2019	Pre-season	(Turkey) Cenk Özcan	15 November 2019
Nõmme Kalju	(Ukraine) Roman Kozhukhovskyi	End of contract	28 November 2019	Pre-season	(Estonia) Marko Kristal	2 December 2019
Kuressaare	(Latvia) Dmitrijs Kalašņikovs	End of contract	16 December 2019	Pre-season	(Ukraine) Roman Kozhukhovskyi	16 December 2019
Tallinna Kalev	(Estonia) Aleksandr Dmitrijev	Mutual consent	18 March 2020	10th	(Estonia) Liivo Leetma	18 March 2020
Narva Trans	(Turkey) Cenk Özcan	Mutual consent	19 June 2010	10th	(Estonia) Oleg Kurotškin	19 June 2010
Levadia	(Estonia) Martin Reim	Resigned	10 July 2020	3rd	(Estonia) Vladimir Vassiljev	10 July 2020
Tallinna Kalev	(Estonia) Liivo Leetma	Sacked	31 August 2020	10th	(Latvia) Dmitrijs Kalašnikovs	31 August 2020

== Format changes ==
Due to the long pause, the season was shortened. Instead of the regular format of each team playing each of the other teams four times, the league were to be split after the third playthrough into two sections of top 6 and bottom 4, with each team playing each other in that section.

On 7 November, due to the second wave of COVID-19, the season was shortened even more with the league split into three sections after the 27th round – top 4, 5th & 6th, and bottom 4, with each team playing each other in that section.

On 11 December the season's last match between Flora and FCI Levadia was cancelled.

== League table ==
Pos	Team	Pld	W	D	L	GF	GA	GD	Pts	Qualification or relegation
1	Flora (C)	29	26	2	1	76	17	+59	80	Qualification for the Champions League first qualifying round
2	Paide Linnameeskond	30	21	1	8	80	43	+37	64	Qualification for the Europa Conference League first qualifying round (Note: FCI Levadia qualified for the Europa Conference League as the other finalist of the 2020–21 Estonian Cup, Flora, has already qualified to the UEFA Champions League)
3	FCI Levadia	29	17	6	6	66	37	+29	57	Qualification for the Europa Conference League first qualifying round
4	Nõmme Kalju	30	14	7	9	52	31	+21	49	
5	Tammeka	28	8	8	12	33	44	−11	32	
6	Tulevik	28	9	4	15	30	46	−16	31	
7	TJK Legion	30	8	7	15	26	44	−18	31	
8	Narva Trans	30	6	7	17	31	49	−18	25	
9	Kuressaare (O)	30	5	9	16	28	63	−35	24	Qualification for the Relegation play-offs
10	Tallinna Kalev (R)	30	5	5	20	20	68	−48	20	Relegation to the Esiliiga

Source: Estonian Football Association (in Estonian), UEFA
Rules for classification: 1) Points; 2) Less matches awarded against; 3) Head-to-head points; 4) Head-to-head goal difference; 5) Matches won; 6) Goal difference; 7) Goals scored; 8) Away goals scored; 9) Fairplay ranking.
(C) Champions; (O) Play-off winners; (R) Relegated

=== Relegation play-offs ===
At season's end Kuressaare, the ninth place club, participated in a two-legged play-off with the runners-up (of independent teams) of the 2020 Esiliiga, Maardu Linnameeskond, for the spot in 2021 Meistriliiga.

10 December 2020	Maardu Linnameeskond	3–5	Kuressaare	Maardu
18:00 (UTC+2)	Anton Aristov 23'; Maksim Krivošein 44'; Ilja Zelentsov 47'	Report	Märten Pajunurm 8'; Sander Laht 11'; Sören Kaldma 61'; Michael Schjønning-Larsen 64'; Rasmus Saar 81'	Stadium: Maardu kunstmuruväljak Referee: Kristo Külljastinen

13 December 2020	Kuressaare	4–2	Maardu Linnameeskond	Kuressaare
13:00 (UTC+2)	Sten Penzev 32'; Mattias Männilaan 59', 81'; Sander Laht 78'	Report	Vladislav Ogorodnik 7'; Vadim Aksjonov 86'	Stadium: Kuressaare kunstmurustaadion Referee: Karl Koppel

Kuressaare won 9–5 on aggregate and retained their Meistriliiga spot for the 2021 season.

== Fixtures and results ==
A total of four rounds was played. In the first three rounds teams played each other three times. In the fourth round the league was split into 3 groups – top 4, 5th and 6th, and bottom 4, where they played each team in their group one more time.

=== Rounds 1–18 ===
Home \ Away	FLO	PAI	LEV	NÕM	TAM	TUL	LEG	TRA	KUR	KLV
Flora	—	3–1	4–0	2–1	0–0	3–0	3–1	3–1	3–0	3–0
Paide Linnameeskond	1–3	—	4–2	1–3	3–0	1–2	2–0	2–1	2–0	4–0
FCI Levadia	1–3	4–1	—	1–1	2–2	5–1	4–0	3–0	1–0	4–0
Nõmme Kalju	1–2	0–1	2–0	—	1–1	0–0	1–2	3–0	1–0	2–0
Tammeka	1–3	0–2	1–1	0–2	—	2–1	1–3	2–2	1–2	0–2
Tulevik	2–1	1–3	1–3	0–6	2–0	—	0–2	0–1	5–0	2–1
TJK Legion	1–3	0–3	0–2	0–6	0–1	0–2	—	0–0	1–1	0–0
Narva Trans	2–3	1–0	4–4	0–1	0–1	0–2	2–0	—	1–0	0–0
Kuressaare	0–4	0–4	2–2	0–2	2–4	3–0	0–0	3–2	—	2–2
Tallinna Kalev	0–3	1–8	0–4	0–4	0–2	0–2	1–0	1–1	0–2	—

Source: Estonian Football Association (in Estonian)
Legend: Blue = home team win; Yellow = draw; Red = away team win.

=== Rounds 19–27 ===
Home \ Away	FLO	PAI	LEV	NÕM	TAM	TUL	LEG	TRA	KUR	KLV
Flora	—	1–0	—	0–0	—	2–1	1–0	—	—	—
Paide Linnameeskond	—	—	1–0	—	3–1	—	—	4–2	6–2	4–1
FCI Levadia	0–2	—	—	2–1	3–2	2–0	—	—	—	3–0
Nõmme Kalju	—	1–3	—	—	—	—	1–1	2–1	—	—
Tammeka	0–1	—	—	0–0	—	—	—	0–0	4–2	—
Tulevik	—	1–4	—	0–1	0–1	—	0–0	—	1–1	—
TJK Legion	—	0–2	1–2	—	3–1	—	—	2–1	—	2–0
Narva Trans	1–2	—	1–2	—	—	0–1	—	—	0–0	—
Kuressaare	0–4	—	1–5	1–1	—	—	2–2	—	—	0–1
Tallinna Kalev	1–4	—	—	1–4	1–2	1–0	—	4–1	—	—

Source: Estonian Football Association (in Estonian)
Legend: Blue = home team win; Yellow = draw; Red = away team win.

=== Top four rounds 28–30 ===
Home \ Away	FLO	LEV	NÕM	PAI
Flora	—	Cancelled	—	—
FCI Levadia	—	—	—	2–2
Nõmme Kalju	0–3	0–2	—	—
Paide Linnameeskond	1–7	—	7–4	—

Source: Estonian Football Association (in Estonian)
Legend: Blue = home team win; Yellow = draw; Red = away team win.

=== Fifth & sixth round 28 ===
Home \ Away	TAM	TUL
Tammeka	—	3–3
Tulevik	—	—

Source: Estonian Football Association (in Estonian)
Legend: Blue = home team win; Yellow = draw; Red = away team win.

=== Bottom four rounds 28–30 ===
Home \ Away	KUR	LEG	TRA	KLV
Kuressaare	—	—	0–3	—
TJK Legion	0–1	—	—	—
Narva Trans	—	1–3	—	1–1
Tallinna Kalev	1–1	0–2	—	—

Source: Estonian Football Association (in Estonian)
Legend: Blue = home team win; Yellow = draw; Red = away team win.

== Season statistics ==
=== Top scorers ===
Rank	Player	Club	Goals
1	(Estonia) Rauno Sappinen	Flora	26
2	(Uganda) Edrisa Lubega	Paide Linnameeskond	14
3	(Estonia) Tristan Koskor	Tammeka	12
4	(Cameroon) Marcelin Gando	FCI Levadia	11
5	(Estonia) Henri Anier	Paide Linnameeskond	10
5	(Netherlands) Deabeas Owusu Sekyere	Paide Linnameeskond	10
5	(Estonia) Konstantin Vassiljev	Flora	10
8	(Ukraine) Vladyslav Khomutov	Nõmme Kalju	9
8	(Ukraine) Yuriy Kolomoyets	FCI Levadia	9
8	(Estonia) Siim Luts	Paide Linnameeskond	9
8	(Estonia) Pavel Marin	Tulevik	9
8	(Estonia) Edgar Tur	Paide Linnameeskond	9
8	(Estonia) Aleksandr Volkov	Nõmme Kalju	9

=== Hat-tricks ===
Player	For	Against	Result	Date
(Estonia) Joseph Saliste	Paide Linnameeskond	Tallinna Kalev	8–1 (A)	7 March 2020
(Estonia) Kaspar Paur	Nõmme Kalju	Tulevik	6–0 (A)	31 May 2020
(Estonia) Edgar Tur	Paide Linnameeskond	Kuressaare	6–2 (H)	1 November 2020
(Estonia) Rauno Sappinen	Flora	Paide Linnameeskond	7–1 (A)	29 November 2020

=== Average attendance ===
Most games were held before empty stands due to the COVID-19 pandemic. Different teams played a different amount of home games before the lockdown.

Club	Average attendance
Tallinna FC Flora	698
Tartu JK Tammeka	402
Viljandi JK Tulevik	400
FCI Levadia	383
Nõmme Kalju FC	326
JK Narva Trans	285
Paide Linnameeskond	257
JK Tallinna Kalev	241
FC Kuressaare	220
Tallinna JK Legion	163
League average	327

== Awards ==
=== Monthly awards ===
Month	Manager of the Month		Player of the Month	
Month	Manager	Club	Player	Club
May	(Estonia) Martin Reim	Levadia	(Brazil) Pedro Victor	Nõmme Kalju
June	(Estonia) Jürgen Henn	Flora	(Estonia) Pavel Marin	Tulevik
July	(Estonia) Jürgen Henn	Flora	(Russia) Amir Natkho	Nõmme Kalju
August	(Estonia) Vjatšeslav Zahovaiko	Paide Linnameeskond	(Estonia) Märten Kuusk	Flora
September	(Estonia) Denis Belov	Legion	(Estonia) Sergei Mošnikov	Paide Linnameeskond
October	(Estonia) Kaido Koppel	Tammeka	(Estonia) Brent Lepistu	FCI Levadia

== Team of the season ==
Position	Player	Club	Previous appearances
GK	(Estonia) Matvei Igonen	Flora	2019, 2016
DF	(Estonia) Michael Lilander	Flora	none
DF	(Estonia) Karl Mööl	Paide	2019, 2017
DF	(Estonia) Märten Kuusk	Flora	2019
DF	(The Gambia) Muhammed Sanneh	Paide	none
MF	(Estonia) Sergei Mošnikov	Paide	2016, 2014, 2013, 2011
MF	(Estonia) Konstantin Vassiljev	Flora	2019, 2006
MF	(Estonia) Vladislav Kreida	Flora	2019
MF	(Estonia) Pavel Marin	Tulevik	none
FW	(Estonia) Rauno Sappinen	Flora	2017, 2015
FW	(Estonia) Henri Anier	Paide	none

== Player transfers ==
- Winter 2019–20 – before the season

== See also ==
- 2020 in Estonian football
