= Adam Natkho =

Russian footballer

Personal information
- Full name: Adam Cherimovich Natkho
- Date of birth: 14 February 1959 (age 67)
- Place of birth: Oktyabrsky, Russian SFSR, Soviet Union
- Height: 1.76 m (5 ft 9 1/2 in)
- Positions: Defender; forward

Senior career*
Years	Team	Apps	(Gls)
1979	FC Niva Korenovsk		
1980–1982	FC Kuban Krasnodar	6	(0)
1983–1992	FC Druzhba Maykop	242	(27)
1994–1995	FC Druzhba Maykop	17	(0)
1998	FC Urozhay Tulsky		
2001	FC Druzhba Maykop	11	(1)

Managerial career
- 1992–1994: Hapoel Kfar Kama
- 1998: FC Urozhay Tulsky
- 1999–2005: FC Druzhba Maykop
- 2007–2008: FC Druzhba Maykop
- 2008–2017: FC Druzhba Maykop (general director)
- * Club domestic league appearances and goals

Adam Cherimovich Natkho (Adyghe: Адам Натхъо, Russian: Адам Черимович Натхо; born 14 February 1959) is a Russian professional football coach and former player.

== Personal life ==
Adam is a Circassian by nationality. He is related to Bibras Natkho and is the father of Amir Natkho.
