= German Šlein =

Estonian footballer (born 1996)

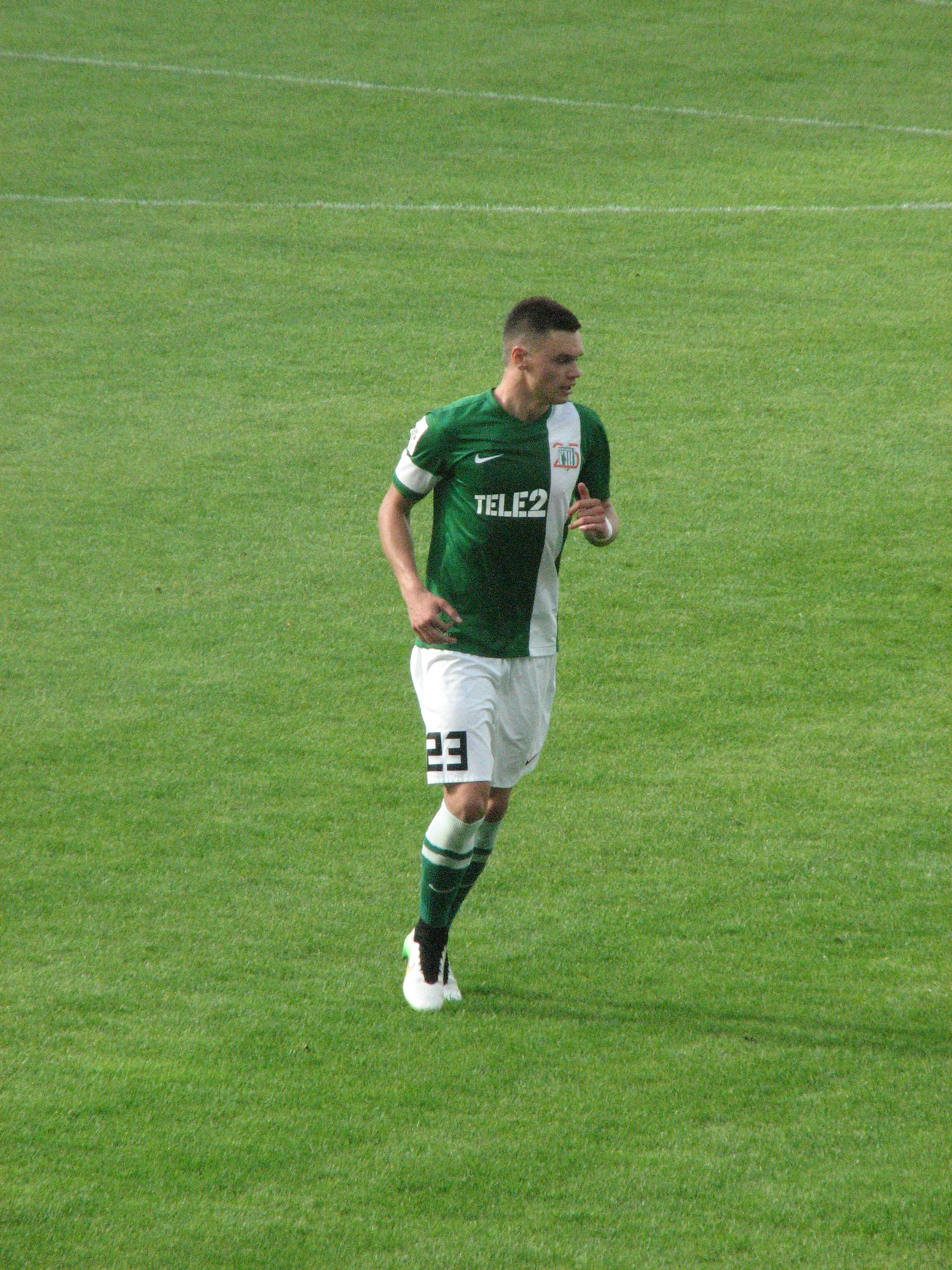
- Šlein in 2015.

Personal information
- Full name: German Šlein
- Date of birth: 28 March 1996 (age 30)
- Place of birth: Tallinn, Estonia
- Height: 1.84 m (6 ft 1/2 in)
- Position: Midfielder

Team information
- Current team: Narva Trans
- Number: 6

Youth career
- 2003–2012: Legion

Senior career*
| Years | Team | Apps | (Gls) |
| 2012–2013 | Legion | 30 | (3) |
| 2013–2018 | Flora U21 | 57 | (5) |
| 2013–2019 | Flora | 58 | (2) |
| 2018–2019 | → Vysočina Jihlava (loan) | 10 | (0) |
| 2019 | → Trans Narva (loan) | 0 | (0) |
| 2019 | → Viljandi Tulevik (loan) | 0 | (0) |
| 2020–2021 | Legion | 40 | (1) |
| 2022–2023 | Nõmme Kalju | 58 | (2) |
| 2024–2025 | Narva Trans | 38 | (1) |
| 2025 | Smederevo | 14 | (1) |
| 2025– | Narva Trans | 41 | (2) |

International career
| 2010–2011 | Estonia U16 | 3 | (0) |
| 2011–2013 | Estonia U17 | 16 | (0) |
| 2014 | Estonia U19 | 12 | (0) |
| 2015–2018 | Estonia U21 | 24 | (0) |
| 2016 | Estonia U23 | 1 | (0) |
- * Club domestic league appearances and goals as of 17 November 2026

German Šlein (born 28 March 1996) is an Estonian professional footballer who plays as a midfielder for Estonian Meistriliiga club Narva Trans.

== Career ==
Šlein joined Flora in the summer 2013. He was loaned out to Czech club FC Vysočina Jihlava for the 2018–19 season. Ahead of the 2019–20 season, he was loaned out to JK Trans Narva but after playing one game for the club in the Europa League qualification due to an injury and returned to FC Flora. A few days later, he joined Viljandi JK Tulevik on loan instead.

== Honours ==
=== Club ===
Flora

- Meistriliiga: 2015, 2017
- Estonian Cup: 2015–16
- Estonian Supercup: 2016
