= Michael Lilander =

Estonian footballer (born 1997)

Personal information
- Full name: Michael Lilander
- Date of birth: 20 June 1997 (age 29)
- Place of birth: Tallinn, Estonia
- Height: 1.77 m (5 ft 9 1/2 in)
- Position: Right back

Team information
- Current team: Paide Linnameeskond
- Number: 2

Youth career
- 2006–2009: Loo
- 2010–2013: Nõmme United

Senior career*
Years	Team	Apps	(Gls)
2013–2014	Nõmme United	37	(15)
2015–2018	Paide Linnameeskond U21	8	(3)
2015–2018	Paide Linnameeskond	119	(8)
2019–2023	Flora	132	(6)
2024	Bohemians	8	(0)
2024–	Paide Linnameeskond	83	(3)

International career^{‡}
2013	Estonia U17	3	(0)
2015	Estonia U19	10	(0)
2017–2018	Estonia U21	9	(1)
2016–2019	Estonia U23	2	(0)
2017–	Estonia	18	(0)
- * Club domestic league appearances and goals as of 17 November 2026 ‡ National team caps and goals as of 21 December 2022

Michael Lilander (born 20 June 1997) is an Estonian professional footballer who plays as a right back for Meistriliiga club Paide Linnameeskond and the Estonia national team.

== International career ==
Lilander made his senior international debut for Estonia on 23 November 2017, in a 1–0 away win over Vanuatu in a friendly.

== Honours ==
=== Club ===
Flora

- Meistriliiga: 2019

=== Individual ===
- Meistriliiga Team of the season: 2020
