= Pavel Londak =

Estonian footballer

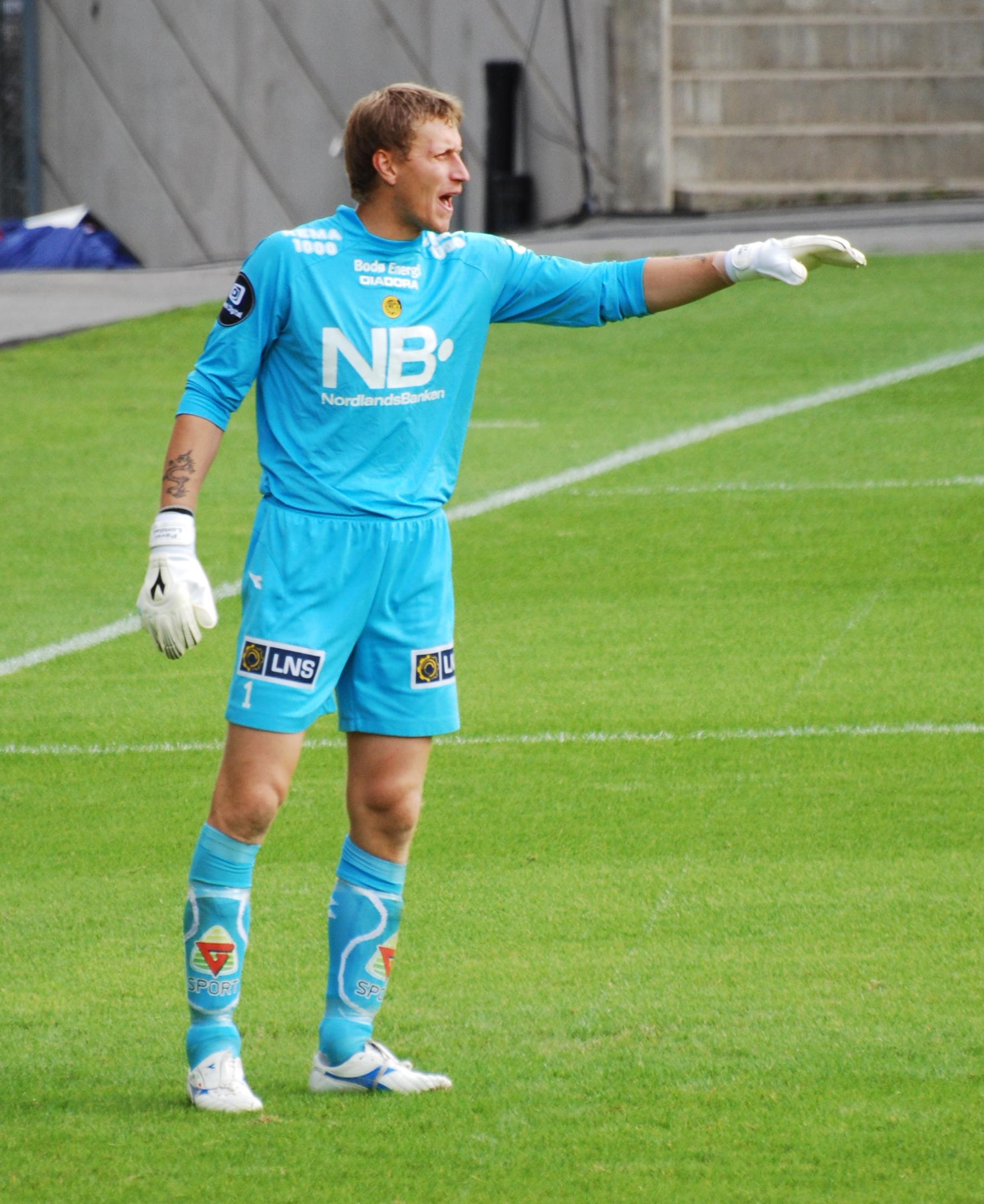
- Londak with Bodø/Glimt in 2009

Personal information
- Date of birth: 14 May 1980 (age 46)
- Place of birth: Tallinn, then part of Estonian SSR, Soviet Union
- Height: 1.91 m (6 ft 3 in)
- Position: Goalkeeper

Youth career
- Kopli

Senior career*
Years	Team	Apps	(Gls)
1997–1999	Lantana	27	(0)
2000	Valga	28	(0)
2000	Paide Linnameeskond	1	(0)
2001	Tulevik	27	(0)
2001	Elva	1	(0)
2002	Valga	19	(0)
2002–2006	Flora	25	(0)
2003	Tervis Pärnu	6	(0)
2003	→ Valga (loan)	16	(0)
2004–2005	→ Tulevik (loan)	59	(0)
2005	→ Lelle (loan)	1	(0)
2007–2015	Bodø/Glimt	185	(0)
2011	→ Bucaspor (loan)	8	(0)
2016	Rosenborg	3	(0)
2017–2019	Nõmme Kalju	42	(0)
2020–2022	Legion	32	(0)

International career
2000–2001	Estonia U21	9	(0)
2001–2016	Estonia	27	(0)
- * Club domestic league appearances and goals as of 25 March 2025

Pavel Londak (born 14 May 1980) is a former Estonian professional footballer who plays as a goalkeeper.

Londak spent most of his career playing in Estonia and Norway. He won the 2016 Tippeligaen with Rosenborg.

== International career ==
Londak made his international debut for Estonia on 4 July 2001, in a 2–5 defeat to Lithuania in a 2001 Baltic Cup match.

== Personal ==
Londak was born Pavel Kisseljov. He changed his surname to Londak in 2003.

== Career statistics ==
=== Club ===
As of match played 13 April 2022

Appearances and goals by club, season and competition
Club	Season	League			National Cup		Continental		Total	
Club	Season	Division	Apps	Goals	Apps	Goals	Apps	Goals	Apps	Goals
Bodø/Glimt	2007	Adeccoligaen	16	0	1	0	-		17	0
Bodø/Glimt	2008	Tippeligaen	24	0	3	0	-		27	0
Bodø/Glimt	2009	Tippeligaen	28	0	1	0	-		29	0
Bodø/Glimt	2010	Adeccoligaen	21	0	3	0	-		24	0
Bodø/Glimt	2011	Adeccoligaen	12	0	0	0	-		12	0
Bodø/Glimt	2012	Adeccoligaen	28	0	3	0	-		31	0
Bodø/Glimt	2013	Adeccoligaen	16	0	4	0	-		20	0
Bodø/Glimt	2014	Tippeligaen	18	0	0	0	-		18	0
Bodø/Glimt	2015	Tippeligaen	22	0	1	0	-		23	0
Bodø/Glimt	Total		185	0	16	0	-	-	201	0
Bucaspor (loan)	2010–11	Süper Lig	8	0	2	0	-		10	0
Bucaspor (loan)	Total		8	0	2	0	-	-	10	0
Rosenborg	2016	Tippeligaen	3	0	3	0	2	0	8	0
Rosenborg	Total		3	0	3	0	2	0	8	0
Nõmme Kalju	2017	Meistriliiga	1	0	0	0	1	0	2	0
Nõmme Kalju	2018	Meistriliiga	21	0	1	0	1	0	23	0
Nõmme Kalju	2019	Meistriliiga	20	0	1	0	6	0	27	0
Nõmme Kalju	Total		42	0	2	0	8	0	52	0
Legion	2020	Meistriliiga	29	0	1	0	-		30	0
Legion	2021	Meistriliiga	2	0	0	0	-		2	0
Legion	2022	Meistriliiga	1	0	0	0	-		1	0
Legion	Total		32	0	1	0	-	-	33	0
Career total			270	0	24	0	10	0	304	0

== Honours ==
=== Club ===
Flora

- Estonian Supercup: 2002

Rosenborg

- Tippeligaen: 2016
- Norwegian Football Cup: 2016

Nõmme Kalju

- Meistriliiga: 2018
- Estonian Supercup: 2019
