= 2020 Estonian Small Cup =

Estonian football competition

Tournament details
- Country: Estonia

The 2020 Estonian Small Cup was the 11th season of the Estonian amateur football knockout tournament. The tournament began on 16 June 2020, and the final took place on 21 October 2020 at the Lilleküla Stadium, Tallinn. Paide Linnameeskond III were the current cup holders.

== Round and game dates ==
Round	Game dates
First round	16 & 18 June
Second round	8–12 July
Third round	21 July – 12 August

== First round ==
The league level that the team represents is indicated in brackets

Rahvaliiga RL (people's league) is a league organized by Estonian Football Association, but not part of the main league system.

Home team	Score	Away team
16 June 2020
Põhja-Tallinna JK Volta II (5)	2–0	Viljandi JK Tulevik III (6)
18 June 2020
FC Maksatransport (RL)	8–0	JK Metsis (RL)
Tallinna FC Ararat (5)	3:–	Saku Jalgpalliklubi (RL)
FC Aruküla (6)	7–2	Rasmus Värki Jalgpallikool (RL)
FC Järva-Jaani (5)	3–3 (7–6 p)	IBK Here for Beer (RL)
Lilleküla JK Retro (5)	w/o	Värska (RL)
FC Otepää (5)	5–0	Kohtla-Nõmme (RL)
FC Maardu Aliens (5)	1–12	Tallinna FC Zapoos (5)
Rummu Dünamo (5)	11–0	Young FC (RL)
Tallinna FC Eston Villa II (5)	9–1	Jalgpalliklubi 32. Keskkool (RL)

== Second round ==
The league level that the team represents is indicated in brackets

Rahvaliiga RL (people's league) is a league organized by Estonian Football Association, but not part of the main league system.

Home team	Score	Away team
8 July 2020
Põhja-Sakala (4)	w/o	FC Sillamäe (5)
Harju JK Laagri (4)	1:– (4:- p)	Raplamaa JK (4)
Nõmme Kalju FC III (5)	1–3	Tallinna FC Ararat (5)
Märjamaa Kompanii (5)	6–0	FC Mulgi (RL)
Tallinna FC Eston Villa (5)	4–2	FC Lelle (6)
Rumouri Calcio II Tallinn (6)	1–6	Põhja-Tallinna JK Volta (4)
9 July 2020
FC Lebo Ülesanne (RL)	2–2 (3–4 p)	Tartu FC Helios (4)
Kohtla-Järve JK Järve III (5)	–:2	Tallinna FC Flora U19 (4)
Maardu Linnameeskond II (4)	–:3	Maarjamäe FC IGI (6)
Anija JK (5)	1–7	Saku Sporting (5)
FC Järva-Jaani (5)	3–2	Tallinna FC Teleios (6)
SK Imavere (5)	4–1	Läänemaa JK Haapsalu (6)
FC Tallinna Wolves (6)	w/o	FC Elva II (5)
Paide Linnameeskond III (4)	7–0	Tallinna JK Jalgpallihaigla (6)
Keila JK II (5)	1–2	FC Otepää (5)
Raasiku FC Joker (4)	w/o	Viimsi JK II (4)
Türi Ganvix JK (5)	3–0	Tallinna FC Reaal (6)
Rummu Dünamo (5)	4–3	Tallinna FC ReUnited (6)
Pärnu JK Poseidon (4)	0–12	Tallinna JK Legion II (4)
FC Maksatransport (RL)	1–1 (5–6 p)	JK Loo (5)
FC Kose (4)	0–9	Tallinna JK Piraaja (4)
Tartu JK Welco X (5)	0–4	Tallinna FC Zenit (5)
Saue JK (4)	0–1	JK Kernu Kadakas (5)
Tallinna FC TransferWise (6)	2–2 (3–4 p)	FC Tarvastu ja JK Tõrva ÜM (5)
Kristiine JK (6)	0–0 (3–4 p)	Rumori Calcio Tallinn (5)
10 July 2020
Tallinna FC Zapoos (5)	6–1	Valga FC Warrior (5)
FC Aruküla (6)	0:–	Lilleküla JK Retro (5)
11 July 2020
Team Helm (RL)	2–1	Tallinna FC Hell Hunt (5)
Tartu JK Welco II (4)	4–0	FC Jõgeva Wolves (4)
12 July 2020
Rakvere JK Tarvas II (5)	w/o	FC Äksi Wolves (5)
Tallinna FC Pocarr (5)	2–6	FC Kuressaare II (4)
Tallinna FC Eston Villa II (6)	0–2	Viimsi Lõvid (6)

== Third round ==
The league level that the team represents is indicated in brackets

Rahvaliiga RL (people's league) is a league organized by Estonian Football Association, but not part of the main league system.

Home team	Score	Away team
21 July 2020
Tallinna FC Zapoos (5)	4–1	Tartu JK Welco II (4)
23 July 2020
Märjamaa Kompanii (5)	0–2	JK Kernu Kadakas (5)
26 July 2020
FC Aruküla (6)	2–3	FC Tarvastu ja JK Tõrva ÜM (5)
Maarjamäe FC IGI (6)	2–1	Rumori Calcio Tallinn (5)
28 July 2020
Harju JK Laagri (6)	1–1 (4–2 p)	Tallinna JK Piraaja (4)
2 August 2020
Tallinna FC Ararat (5)	0–9	Tallinna JK Legion II (4)
Tallinna FC Eston Villa (5)	7–1	FC Järva-Jaani (5)
3 August 2020
Tallinna FC Flora U19 (4)	1–2	FC Otepää (5)
