= Sergei Mošnikov =

Estonian footballer

Personal information
- Date of birth: 7 January 1988 (age 38)
- Place of birth: Pärnu, then part of Estonian SSR, Soviet Union
- Height: 1.77 m (5 ft 10 in)
- Position: Midfielder

Youth career
- 2002–2005: Pärnu
- 2005–2006: SC Heerenveen

Senior career*
Years	Team	Apps	(Gls)
2005	Vaprus	7	(0)
2006–2010	Flora II	15	(8)
2006–2011	Flora	157	(31)
2011–2013	Pogoń Szczecin	2	(0)
2012	Pogoń Szczecin II	5	(0)
2013	Górnik Zabrze	18	(1)
2013	Górnik Zabrze II	3	(0)
2014	Kaysar Kyzylorda	18	(0)
2014	Flora	7	(0)
2015	Tobol Kostanay	5	(1)
2016	Infonet	28	(6)
2017	Minsk	11	(1)
2017	PS Kemi	15	(3)
2018	Górnik Łęczna	14	(2)
2018	Shakhter Karagandy	9	(0)
2019	Palanga	23	(1)
2020–2023	Paide Linnameeskond	114	(13)
2024	FCI Levadia U21	16	(4)

International career
2004	Estonia U17	2	(0)
2006	Estonia U19	3	(1)
2006–2010	Estonia U21	25	(1)
2011–2012	Estonia U23	2	(0)
2010–2018	Estonia	35	(2)
- * Club domestic league appearances and goals

Sergei Mošnikov (born 7 January 1988) is an Estonian former professional footballer who played as a midfielder.

== Club career ==
=== Early career ===
Mošnikov came through the youth system at Pärnu. He made his senior league debut while on loan at Vaprus in the Esiliiga. In September 2005, Mošnikov joined sc Heerenveen academy in the Netherlands.

=== Flora ===
In July 2006, Mošnikov returned to Estonia and joined Flora. He made his debut in the Meistriliiga on 9 July 2006, in a 0–1 home loss to Levadia. Mošnikov won two Meistriliiga titles in 2010 and 2011.

=== Pogoń Szczecin ===
On 21 December 2011, Mošnikov signed a two-and-a-half-year contract with Polish club Pogoń Szczecin. He failed to break into the first team as his club finished the 2011–12 I liga as runners up and were promoted to the Ekstraklasa. Mošnikov made his debut in the Ekstraklasa on 29 September 2012, in 1–1 home draw against Jagiellonia Białystok.

=== Górnik Zabrze ===
On 26 January 2013, Mošnikov moved to Polish club Górnik Zabrze on a one-year deal, with the option to extend the contract for two and a half years. He scored his first Ekstraklasa goal on 2 June 2013, in a 2–0 away win over Lechia Gdańsk.

=== Kaysar Kyzylorda ===
On 24 February 2014, Mošnikov signed a one-year contract with Kazakhstan Premier League club Kaysar Kyzylorda.

=== Return to Flora ===
On 4 September 2014, Mošnikov signed a contract with his former club Flora until the end of the 2014 season.

=== Tobol Kostanay ===
On 9 February 2015, Mošnikov signed a one-year contract with Kazakh club Tobol Kostanay.

=== Infonet ===
On 11 February 2016, Mošnikov returned to Estonia and signed a one-year contract with Infonet. He won his third Meistriliiga title in the 2016 season.

=== Minsk ===
On 15 February 2017, Mošnikov signed a one-year contract with Belarusian club Minsk. He made his debut in the Belarusian Premier League on 1 April 2017, scoring in a 2–2 home draw against Dynamo Brest. On 5 July 2017, Mošnikov was released from his contract with Minsk by mutual agreement.

=== PS Kemi ===
On 18 July 2017, Mošnikov signed for Finnish club PS Kemi until the end of the 2017 season.

=== Górnik Łęczna ===
On 8 March 2018, Mošnikov signed for Polish club Górnik Łęczna.

=== Shakhter Karagandy ===
On 26 July 2018, Mošnikov joined Kazakh club Shakhter Karagandy on a six-month deal, with the option for the club to extend his contract. He left the club again at the end of 2018.

== International career ==
Mošnikov made his senior international debut for Estonia on 19 June 2010, replacing Gert Kams in the 73rd minute of a 0–0 draw against Latvia at the 2010 Baltic Cup. He scored his first international goal on 7 October 2016, in a 4–0 home win over Gibraltar in a qualification match for the 2018 FIFA World Cup.

== Career statistics ==
As of 12 November 2018. Estonia score listed first, score column indicates score after each Mošnikov goal.

Appearances and goals by national team and year
National team	Year	Apps	Goals
Estonia
Estonia	2010	4	0
Estonia	2011	3	0
Estonia	2012	5	0
Estonia	2013	7	0
Estonia	2014	4	0
Estonia	2016	5	1
Estonia	2017	6	1
Estonia	2018	1	0
Total		35	2

International goals by date, venue, cap, opponent, score, result and competition
No.	Date	Venue	Cap	Opponent	Score	Result	Competition
1	7 October 2016	A. Le Coq Arena, Tallinn, Estonia	24	Gibraltar	4–0	4–0	2018 FIFA World Cup qualification
2	12 November 2017	National Stadium, Ta' Qali, Malta	32	Malta	2–0	3–0	Friendly

== Honours ==
Flora

- Meistriliiga: 2010, 2011
- Estonian Cup: 2007–08, 2008–09, 2010–11
- Estonian Supercup: 2009, 2011

Infonet

- Meistriliiga: 2016

Paide

- Estonian Cup: 2021–22
- Estonian Supercup: 2023

Individual

- Meistriliiga Player of the Year: 2011
- Meistriliiga Player of the Month: September 2020
- Meistriliiga Team of the season: 2020
