= Amir Natkho =

Russian footballer

Personal information
- Full name: Amir Adamovich Natkho
- Date of birth: 9 July 1996 (age 30)
- Place of birth: Maykop, Russia
- Height: 1.89 m (6 ft 2 1/2 in)
- Position: Midfielder

Youth career
- Druzhba Maykop
- 2008–2012: Konoplyov football academy
- 2014–2015: Barcelona

Senior career*
Years	Team	Apps	(Gls)
2012–2013	Druzhba Maykop	18	(1)
2014–2015	Barcelona B	0	(0)
2015–2016	CSKA Moscow	0	(0)
2016	Krasnodar	0	(0)
2016	→ Krasnodar-2	10	(0)
2017–2018	Lokomotiv Moscow	0	(0)
2018	Viitorul Constanța	1	(0)
2019	BATE Borisov	0	(0)
2019	Yevpatoriya	6	(1)
2020–2021	Nõmme Kalju	26	(3)
2021–2022	FCI Levadia	10	(1)
2022	Armavir (amateur)		
2022–2023	SKA-Khabarovsk	5	(1)

International career^{‡}
2011	Russia U16	2	(0)
- * Club domestic league appearances and goals as of 27 November 2022 ‡ National team caps and goals as of 24 November 2011

Amir Adamovich Natkho (Russian: Амир Адамович Натхо; born 9 July 1996) is a Russian professional footballer who plays as a midfielder.

== Career ==
Natkho was formed at the Konoplyov football academy, where alumni included Alan Dzagoev and Artur Yusupov. He made his debut in the Russian Second Division for FC Druzhba Maykop on 16 July 2012 in a game against FC MITOS Novocherkassk. He made 18 appearances across the season, scoring one goal in a 3–1 win over Alania Vladikavkaz on 31 July.

On 10 July 2014 he transferred to Barcelona, being put into their Under-19 team. On 24 November he scored his first goal, in a 3–2 win against APOEL in the UEFA Youth League. He did not break into the main squad, where only one Russian had ever played, Igor Korneev in the 1990s.

On 1 September 2015, Natkho returned to Russia, signing for CSKA Moscow. He was entered into their Russian Premier League and UEFA Champions League squads. He made his CSKA debut on 23 September in a Russian Cup game against FC Baikal Irkutsk.

On 20 June 2016, he was released from his CSKA contract.

On 29 August 2016, he signed a four-year contract with FC Krasnodar. He was removed from their first-team and reserve squads on 19 December.

On 11 February 2017, he signed with FC Lokomotiv Moscow. On 3 August 2018, he signed a two-year contract with the Romanian club FC Viitorul Constanța.

== Personal life ==
His father Adam Natkho is a former player and coach, while his cousin Bibras Natkho is a midfielder for Parizan Belgrade and Israel. Amir is a Circassian by nationality.

== Honours ==
Individual

- Meistriliiga Player of the Month: July 2020
