= Pavel Marin =

Estonian footballer (born 1995)

Personal information
- Full name: Pavel Marin
- Date of birth: 14 June 1995 (age 31)
- Place of birth: Keila, Estonia
- Height: 1.76 m (5 ft 9 1/2 in)
- Position: Attacking midfielder

Team information
- Current team: Tammeka
- Number: 79

Youth career
- 2004–2006: Keila
- 2007–2011: SC Real

Senior career*
Years	Team	Apps	(Gls)
2011–2013	Puuma	72	(12)
2013–2019	FCI Levadia U21	50	(27)
2014–2019	FCI Levadia	126	(18)
2018	→ KPV (loan)	14	(3)
2020–2021	Viljandi Tulevik	26	(11)
2021–2026	Nõmme Kalju	152	(37)
2026–	Tammeka	26	(8)

International career^{‡}
2011	Estonia U17	8	(1)
2012	Estonia U18	1	(0)
2012–2013	Estonia U19	4	(0)
2014–2016	Estonia U21	26	(0)
2016–	Estonia	14	(2)
- * Club domestic league appearances and goals as of 17 November 2026 ‡ National team caps and goals as of 31 December 2021

Pavel Marin (born 14 June 1995) is an Estonian professional footballer who plays as an attacking midfielder for Estonian club Tartu JK Tammeka and the Estonia national team.

== Club career ==
=== Puuma ===
Marin first played for a local club Keila, before moving to SC Real in 2007. He made his senior league debut in 2011, playing for Esiliiga team Puuma.

=== Levadia ===
In July 2013, Marin moved to Levadia's reserve team Levadia II. He signed his first professional contract with the club in December 2013. Marin made his debut for Levadia's first team on 25 February 2014, in an Estonian Supercup match against Flora, as the team lost 0–1. He made his debut in the Meistriliiga on 15 March 2014, and scored in an 8–0 away win over Tallinna Kalev. Marin won his first Meistriliiga title in the 2014 season.

==== KPV (loan) ====
On 3 August 2018, Marin joined Ykkönen club KPV on loan until the end of the season.

==== Viljandi Tulevik ====
On 10 December 2020, as somewhat of a surprise for the fans, Marin joined Premium Liiga side Viljandi Tulevik, stating he had numerous other offers from Estonia and abroad but took the offer because he was seen as a key player in the team by the manager Sander Post.

He scored his first goal for the club in the second round of Premium Liiga already in a 2:1 away win against Paide Linnameeskond and quickly became an irreplaceable player and top scorer for the team. In October 2020 he received a call-up to the Estonian national team as a first active player from the again-independent Tulevik. He then went on to make the club's history in other aspects as well: he was in a starting eleven in the match against Lithuania in a friendly game and scored Estonia's only goal in a 1:3 loss. In the end Marin played in all three matches in that particular national team break.

== International career ==
Marin made his senior international debut for Estonia on 29 May 2016, in a 0–2 loss to Lithuania at the 2016 Baltic Cup. He scored his first international goal on 22 November 2016, in a 1–0 away win over Antigua and Barbuda in a friendly.

=== International goals ===
As of 12 October 2020. Estonia score listed first, score column indicates score after each Marin goal.

International goals by date, venue, cap, opponent, score, result and competition
No.	Date	Venue	Cap	Opponent	Score	Result	Competition
1	22 November 2016	Antigua Recreation Ground, St. John's, Antigua and Barbuda	8	Antigua and Barbuda	1–0	1–0	Friendly
2	7 October 2020	A. Le Coq Arena, Tallinn, Estonia	10	Lithuania	1–3	1–3	Friendly

== Honours ==
=== Club ===
Levadia II

- Esiliiga: 2013

Levadia

- Meistriliiga: 2014
- Estonian Cup: 2013–14, 2017–18
- Estonian Supercup: 2015, 2018

=== Individual ===
- Meistriliiga Player of the Month: June 2020
- Meistriliiga Team of the season: 2020
