= Maksim Gussev =

Estonian footballer

Personal information
- Full name: Maksim Gussev
- Date of birth: 20 July 1994 (age 32)
- Place of birth: Narva, Estonia
- Height: 1.73 m (5 ft 8 in)
- Position: Winger

Team information
- Current team: Levadia U21
- Number: 64

Youth career
- 2005: Puuma
- 2006–2012: Legion

Senior career*
Years	Team	Apps	(Gls)
2010–2011	Legion II	4	(1)
2010–2012	Legion	61	(27)
2013–2015	Flora II	11	(3)
2013–2019	Flora	129	(22)
2019	→ KPV (loan)	10	(0)
2019	→ MyPa (loan)	10	(2)
2020–2021	Legion Tallinn	12	(1)
2021-2023	Nõmme Kalju	56	(8)
2024-	Levadia U21	62	(21)
2024	Levadia	1	(0)

International career
2014–2015	Estonia U21	20	(5)
2014–2018	Estonia U23	3	(0)
2015–2016	Estonia	9	(1)
- * Club domestic league appearances and goals as of 17 November 2026

Maksim Gussev (born 20 July 1994) is an Estonian professional footballer who plays as a winger for Levadia U21.

== Club career ==
Gussev joined Legion Football Academy in 2006 and made his first-team debut in 2010. In 2013, he signed with Flora and made his Meistriliiga debut on 9 March 2013 against Paide Linnameeskond. He went on loan to Finnish club KPV in 2019.

== International career ==
Gussev made his international debut for the Estonia national football team on 9 June 2015 against Finland. He scored his first international goal in his second match on 11 November 2015 against Georgia in a friendly.

=== International goals ===
Scores and results list Estonia's goal tally first.

No.	Date	Venue	Cap	Opponent	Score	Result	Competition
1	11 November 2015	A. Le Coq Arena, Tallinn, Estonia	2	Georgia	3–0	3–0	Friendly

== Honours ==
=== Club ===
Flora

- Meistriliiga: 2015
- Estonian Cup: 2012–13, 2015–16
- Estonian Supercup: 2014, 2016
