= Joseph Saliste =

Estonian footballer (born 1995)

Personal information
- Full name: Joseph Saliste
- Date of birth: 10 April 1995 (age 31)
- Place of birth: Tallinn, Estonia
- Height: 1.73 m (5 ft 8 in)
- Position: Left back

Team information
- Current team: FCI Levadia
- Number: 29

Youth career
- 2003–2011: Flora

Senior career*
Years	Team	Apps	(Gls)
2012–2014	Flora III	17	(5)
2012–2018	Flora U21	99	(14)
2014–2019	Flora	107	(12)
2011	→ Warrior (loan)	14	(0)
2019	→ Trans Narva (loan)	35	(5)
2020-2025	Paide Linnameeskond	177	(5)
2026-	FCI Levadia	35	(1)

International career^{‡}
2013	Estonia U19	10	(2)
2015–2016	Estonia U21	12	(1)
2018	Estonia U23	1	(0)
2017-	Estonia	12	(0)
- * Club domestic league appearances and goals as of 17 November 2026 ‡ National team caps and goals as of 8 October 2026

Joseph Saliste (born 10 April 1995) is an Estonian professional footballer who plays as a left back for Estonian club FCI Levadia and the Estonia national team.

== Career ==
On 20 February 2019, Saliste was loaned out to JK Trans Narva for one year.

== International career ==
Saliste made his senior international debut for Estonia on 19 November 2017, replacing Trevor Elhi in the second half of a 2–0 away victory over Fiji in a friendly.

== Honours ==
=== Club ===
Flora

- Meistriliiga: 2015, 2017
- Estonian Cup: 2015–16
- Estonian Supercup: 2016

=== Individual ===
- Meistriliiga Player of the Month: August 2021
