= Estonia national under-23 football team =

Estonia U23
- Nickname: Sinisärgid (Blueshirts)
- Association: Estonian Football Association
- Most caps: Trevor Elhi (6)
- Top scorer: Mattias Käit (2)
- Home stadium: Lilleküla Stadium
First colours	Second colours

The Estonia national under-23 football team represents Estonia in the International Challenge Trophy competition and is controlled by the Estonian Football Association, the governing body for football in Estonia.

The team's home ground is the Lilleküla Stadium in Tallinn.

== Coaching staff ==
Position	Name
Head coach	Vacant Position
Assistant coach	(Estonia) Ats Sillaste
Assistant coach	(Estonia) Mario Hansi
Goalkeeping coach	(Estonia) Aiko Orgla
Physiotherapist	(Estonia) Priit Ailt
Physiotherapist	(Estonia) Sten Ütsmüts
Manager	(Estonia) Ljubov Lobõševa

== Players ==
=== Current squad ===
The following players were called up for the friendly match against England C on 10 October 2018.

Caps and goals updated as of 10 October 2018, after the match against England C.

No.	Pos.	Player	Date of birth (age)	Caps	Goals	Club
1	GK	Richard Aland	15 March 1994 (age 32)	3	0	(Estonian Football Association) Vaprus
12	GK	Magnus Karofeld	20 August 1996 (age 30)	0	0	(Estonian Football Association) Flora
2	DF	Vladimir Avilov	10 March 1995 (age 31)	3	0	(Estonian Football Association) Nõmme Kalju
3	DF	Joseph Saliste	10 April 1995 (age 31)	1	0	(Estonian Football Association) Flora
4	DF	Hindrek Ojamaa	12 June 1995 (age 31)	3	0	(Football Association of Finland) VPS
5	DF	Gerdo Juhkam	19 June 1994 (age 32)	2	0	(Estonian Football Association) Tulevik
13	DF	Janar Õunap	9 September 1994 (age 32)	1	0	(Estonian Football Association) Tulevik
14	DF	Alger Džumadil	29 July 1996 (age 30)	1	0	(Estonian Football Association) Tallinna Kalev
8	MF	Kaspar Paur	16 February 1995 (age 31)	1	0	(Estonian Football Association) Nõmme Kalju
9	MF	Maksim Gussev	20 July 1994 (age 32)	3	0	(Estonian Football Association) Flora
10	MF	Tauno Tekko	14 December 1994 (age 31)	2	0	(Estonian Football Association) Tammeka
15	MF	Roman Sobtšenko	25 January 1994 (age 32)	2	0	(Estonian Football Association) Tallinna Kalev
16	MF	Andre Paju	5 January 1995 (age 31)	2	0	(Estonian Football Association) Tammeka
17	MF	Sander Kapper	8 December 1994 (age 31)	1	0	(Estonian Football Association) Tammeka
18	MF	Rasmus Peetson	3 May 1995 (age 31)	2	0	(Estonian Football Association) FCI Levadia
6	FW	Kevin Kauber	23 March 1995 (age 31)	3	0	(Football Association of Finland) EIF
7	FW	Robert Kirss (captain)	3 September 1994 (age 32)	2	0	(Estonian Football Association) Nõmme Kalju
11	FW	Tristan Koskor	28 November 1995 (age 30)	1	0	(Estonian Football Association) Tammeka

== See also ==
- Estonia national football team
- Estonia national under-21 football team
- Estonia national under-19 football team
- Estonia national under-17 football team
- Estonia national youth football team
