= Trevor Elhi =

Estonian footballer

Personal information
- Full name: Trevor Elhi
- Date of birth: 11 April 1993 (age 33)
- Place of birth: Tallinn, Estonia
- Height: 1.77 m (5 ft 9 1/2 in)
- Position: Left back

Team information
- Current team: FCI Levadia U21
- Number: 67

Youth career
- 2003–2005: Kotkas Juunior
- 2006–2010: Levadia

Senior career*
Years	Team	Apps	(Gls)
2009–2012	Levadia II	93	(28)
2011–2012	Levadia	21	(4)
2013–2015	Infonet	105	(8)
2016	Nõmme Kalju U21	11	(2)
2016–2018	Nõmme Kalju	76	(5)
2019	Botev Vratsa	0	(0)
2019	SJK Seinäjoki	16	(0)
2020–2021	FCI Levadia	33	(1)
2022	Nõmme Kalju	32	(2)
2023	Zenit Tallinn	7	(2)
2023–2024	FCI Levadia U19	36	(38)
2025	Puuma Tallinn	23	(5)
2026–	FCI Levadia U21	12	(2)
2026–	FCI Levadia U19	17	(7)

International career^{‡}
2008	Estonia U16	1	(0)
2009	Estonia U17	8	(2)
2010	Estonia U18	3	(0)
2010–2012	Estonia U19	14	(0)
2013–2014	Estonia U21	18	(0)
2013–2016	Estonia U23	6	(0)
2016–2019	Estonia	9	(0)
- * Club domestic league appearances and goals as of 17 November 2026 ‡ National team caps and goals as of 21 June 2022

Trevor Elhi (born 11 April 1993) is an Estonian professional footballer who plays as a left back for Estonian club FCI Levadia U21 in the Esiliiga.

== International career ==
Elhi began his international career with the Estonia under-16 team in 2008, and went on to represent the under-17, under-18, under-19, under-21, and under-23 national sides.

Elhi made his senior international debut for Estonia on 22 November 2016, in a 1–0 away win over Antigua and Barbuda in a friendly.

== Honours ==
=== Club ===
Levadia II

- Esiliiga: 2009, 2010

Levadia

- Estonian Cup: 2011–12

Nõmme Kalju

- Meistriliiga: 2018
