= Sören Kaldma =

Estonian footballer

Personal information
- Date of birth: 3 July 1996 (age 30)
- Place of birth: Tallinn, Estonia
- Height: 1.85 m (6 ft 1 in)
- Positions: Defender; defensive midfielder

Team information
- Current team: FC Kuressaare

Youth career
- 2004–2007: Kotkas Juunior
- 2008–2012: Nõmme Kalju

Senior career*
Years	Team	Apps	(Gls)
2012–2016	Nõmme Kalju U21	129	(18)
2015–2016	Nõmme Kalju	10	(0)
2018–2019	Paide Linnameeskond U21	4	(0)
2017–2019	Paide Linnameeskond	81	(1)
2020	Tallinna Kalev	10	(0)
2020-	FC Kuressaare	0	(0)

International career^{‡}
2014	Estonia U19	12	(0)
2016–2018	Estonia U21	13	(1)
2017	Estonia	3	(0)
- * Club domestic league appearances and goals as of 19 November 2019 ‡ National team caps and goals as of 19 November 2018

Sören Kaldma (born 3 July 1996) is an Estonian professional footballer who plays as a defensive midfielder for Estonian club FC Kuressaare.

== International career ==
Kaldma made his senior international debut for Estonia on 19 November 2017, in a 2–0 away victory over Fiji in a friendly.

== Personal life ==
His grandfather, Toomas Kaldma, was a footballer and referee, who played during the 1960s and later officiated in the Meistriliiga, as well as 14 matches in the Soviet Top League.

== Honours ==
Nõmme Kalju

- Estonian Cup: 2014–15
