= List of Estonian football transfers winter 2013–14 =

This is a list of Estonian football transfers in the winter transfer window 2013–14 by club. Only transfers in Meistriliiga are included.

== Meistriliiga ==
=== Flora ===
In:

No.	Pos.	Nation	Player
7	MF	(Georgia (country)) GEO	Zakaria Beglarishvili (free agent)
15	DF	(Estonia) EST	Erkki Junolainen (from Levadia)
29	DF	(Estonia) EST	Taavi Rähn (from (Finland) Jaro)
—	DF	(Estonia) EST	Raio Piiroja (from (China) Chengdu Tiancheng)

Out:

No.	Pos.	Nation	Player
8	MF	(Netherlands) NED	Sander van de Streek (loan return to (Netherlands) Vitesse Arnhem)
13	MF	(Estonia) EST	Reio Laabus (to Tammeka)
17	FW	(Sierra Leone) SLE	Lamin Suma
24	DF	(Estonia) EST	Karl Palatu (to Paide Linnameeskond)

=== Infonet ===
In:

No.	Pos.	Nation	Player
5	DF	(Russia) RUS	Aleksander Semakhin
6	MF	(Estonia) EST	Deniss Malov
8	MF	(Estonia) EST	Tanel Melts (from Nõmme Kalju II)
19	FW	(France) FRA	Kassim Aidara (to Sillamäe Kalev)
—	FW	(Estonia) EST	Marten Saarlas (from Levadia II)

Out:

No.	Pos.	Nation	Player
6	MF	(Estonia) EST	Dmitri Kovtunovitš (to Paide Linnameeskond)
7	FW	(Russia) RUS	Aleksandr Bebikh (to (Russia) Kolomna)
19	MF	(Belarus) BLR	Uladzimir Kharlanau (to (Belarus) Rechitsa)

=== Sillamäe Kalev ===
In:

No.	Pos.	Nation	Player
2	DF	(Japan) JPN	Hiroki Maehara (to Nõmme Kalju)
4	DF	(Estonia) EST	Andrei Sidorenkov (from (Belarus) Gomel)
6	MF	(Estonia) EST	Denis Vnukov (from Lokomotiv)
8	MF	(Estonia) EST	Maksim Paponov (from Tallinna Kalev)
16	GK	(Estonia) EST	Mihhail Lavrentjev (from Paide Linnameeskond)
17	FW	(Ukraine) UKR	Yaroslav Kvasov (from (Ukraine) Zorya Luhansk)
18	MF	(Ukraine) UKR	Oleksiy Lazebnyi (from (Ukraine) Skala Stryi)
33	FW	(Russia) RUS	Stanislav Murikhin (from (Russia) Terek Grozny)

Out:

No.	Pos.	Nation	Player
2	DF	(Lithuania) LTU	Marius Činikas (to (Lithuania) Sūduva Marijampolė)
13	MF	(Lithuania) LTU	Gajus Kulbis
15	MF	(Estonia) EST	Martin Vunk (to Nõmme Kalju)
17	MF	(Estonia) EST	Sergei Vihrov
94	MF	(France) FRA	Kassim Aidara (to Infonet)

=== Tallinna Kalev ===
In:

No.	Pos.	Nation	Player
2	DF	(Estonia) EST	Edgars Butlers (from Kuressaare)
3	DF	(Estonia) EST	Ando Hausenberg (from Tammeka)
6	MF	(Estonia) EST	Gregor Aru (from Flora II)
7	FW	(Georgia (country)) GEO	Lasha Omanidze (free agent)
11	DF	(Estonia) EST	Alen Stepanjan (from (Finland) Viikingit)
13	DF	(Estonia) EST	Oliver Heliste (from M.C. Tallinn)
14	MF	(Estonia) EST	Henry Niinlaub (free agent)
17	MF	(Estonia) EST	Juri Gavrilov (from Kuressaare)
18	DF	(Estonia) EST	Ragnar Rump (free agent)
19	DF	(Finland) FIN	Ionel Armean (free agent)
20	FW	(Estonia) EST	Aleksei Belov (to Trans)
—	MF	(Estonia) EST	Albert Anissimov (from Pärnu Linnameeskond)
—	MF	(Estonia) EST	Raiko Karpov (from Kuressaare)

Out:

No.	Pos.	Nation	Player
2	DF	(Estonia) EST	Kevin Ingermann
7	DF	(Equatorial Guinea) EQG	Dani Evuy
8	MF	(Estonia) EST	Maksim Paponov (to Sillamäe Kalev)
9	FW	(Serbia) SRB	Stefan Tripković (to (Serbia) Rad)
12	MF	(Estonia) EST	Martin Tšegodajev (to FCF Tallinna Ülikool)
15	DF	(Estonia) EST	Mikk Sillaste (to HÜJK Emmaste)
19	FW	(Bosnia and Herzegovina) BIH	Aladin Šišić (to (Slovenia) Domžale)
23	MF	(Estonia) EST	Ats Sillaste
31	GK	(Estonia) EST	Mart-Mattis Niinepuu (to Paide Linnameeskond)
34	MF	(Estonia) EST	Risto Kägo (to Lions Gibraltar)

=== Nõmme Kalju ===
In:

No.	Pos.	Nation	Player
4	DF	(Estonia) EST	Mikk Reintam (from (Finland) JJK)
7	MF	(France) FRA	Réginald Mbu Alidor (free agent)
8	MF	(Estonia) EST	Karl Mööl (from Kuressaare)
12	MF	(Bosnia and Herzegovina) BIH	Novo Papaz (from (Bosnia and Herzegovina) Famos Vojkovići)
13	MF	(Estonia) EST	Martin Vunk (from Sillamäe Kalev)
16	FW	(Estonia) EST	Andre Järva (from Ararat TTÜ)
20	MF	(Brazil) BRA	Fabinho

Out:

No.	Pos.	Nation	Player
2	DF	(Italy) ITA	Marco Bianchi
3	DF	(Estonia) EST	Andres Koogas
4	DF	(Japan) JPN	Hiroki Maehara (to Sillamäe Kalev)
7	MF	(Estonia) EST	Eino Puri (to (Romania) Botoșani)
8	MF	(The Gambia) GAM	Yankuba Ceesay (to (Finland) Kajaani)
12	MF	(Brazil) BRA	Jefferson
18	MF	(Estonia) EST	Sergei Terehhov (retired)
20	FW	(Estonia) EST	Alo Dupikov
23	FW	(Estonia) EST	Vladimir Voskoboinikov (to (China) Qingdao Hainiu)
88	MF	(Bosnia and Herzegovina) BIH	Adis Hadžanović (on loan to (Yemen) Al-Ahli Sana'a)

=== Levadia ===
In:

No.	Pos.	Nation	Player
5	MF	(Egypt) EGY	Omar Elhussieny (from (Egypt) Kahrbaa Ismailia)
7	MF	(Finland) FIN	Jere Aallikko (from (Hungary) Budapest Honvéd)
16	MF	(Estonia) EST	Heiko Tamm (from Tammeka)
18	FW	(Lithuania) LTU	Arsenij Buinickij (from (Lithuania) Ekranas)
25	FW	(Russia) RUS	Vladislav Ivanov (from (Russia) Khimik Dzerzhinsk)
26	DF	(Russia) RUS	Mark Dubinin (from Puuma)
33	MF	(Serbia) SRB	Dragomir Vukobratović (from (Russia) Gazovik Orenburg)

Out:

No.	Pos.	Nation	Player
4	DF	(Estonia) EST	Kaspar Kaldoja (to Paide Linnameeskond)
5	MF	(Estonia) EST	Erkki Junolainen (to Flora)
7	FW	(Russia) RUS	Nikita Kolyaev
15	MF	(Estonia) EST	Aleksandr Dmitrijev
20	MF	(Estonia) EST	Andero Pebre
25	MF	(Estonia) EST	Svjatoslav Jakovlev (to Lokomotiv)
28	FW	(Estonia) EST	Rimo Hunt (to (Kazakhstan) Kaysar Kyzylorda)
33	MF	(Estonia) EST	Dmitri Kruglov (to (Azerbaijan) Ravan Baku)

=== Lokomotiv ===
In:

No.	Pos.	Nation	Player
4	DF	(Estonia) EST	Valeri Kurlõtškin (from Puuma)
5	MF	(Republic of the Congo) CGO	Preche Mboungou (to Tammeka)
6	MF	(Russia) RUS	Anton Vasilev (from (Russia) Rus Saint Petersburg)
9	MF	(Estonia) EST	Kevin Kaivoja (from Järve)
11	DF	(Estonia) EST	Deniss Kulikov (from Trans)
12	FW	(Georgia (country)) GEO	Lasha Naveriani (from (Georgia (country)) Samgurali Tskaltubo)
13	MF	(Estonia) EST	Aleksandr Hlobõstin (from Järve)
17	MF	(Estonia) EST	Svjatoslav Jakovlev (to Levadia)
20	DF	(Russia) RUS	Yegor Potapov (from (Russia) Piter Saint Petersburg)
23	FW	(Latvia) LVA	Rihards Ivanovs (from (Latvia) Rēzekne)
25	DF	(Russia) RUS	Bogdan Nesterenko (from (Russia) Mashuk-KMV Pyatigorsk)
27	FW	(Russia) RUS	Vitali Kutuzov (from Trans)
28	GK	(Estonia) EST	Valeri Smelkov (from Trans)

Out:

No.	Pos.	Nation	Player
4	DF	(Estonia) EST	Vladislav Smolin (to Järve)
7	MF	(Estonia) EST	Denis Vnukov (to Sillamäe Kalev)
10	MF	(Estonia) EST	Aleksei Mamontov (to Irbis)
11	FW	(Estonia) EST	Vassili Kulik (to Infonet II)
13	MF	(Estonia) EST	Aleksandr Dubõkin (to (Armenia) Ararat Yerevan)
15	MF	(Estonia) EST	Maksim Babjak (to Irbis)
18	MF	(Estonia) EST	Andrei Tjunin (to Irbis)
19	MF	(Estonia) EST	Marek Šatov (to Irbis)
20	MF	(Estonia) EST	Artur Makarov

=== Paide Linnameeskond ===
In:

No.	Pos.	Nation	Player
1	GK	(Estonia) EST	Mart-Mattis Niinepuu (from Tallinna Kalev)
6	DF	(Estonia) EST	Kaspar Kaldoja (from Levadia)
9	MF	(Estonia) EST	Stanislav Goldberg (from (Finland) SJK)
11	FW	(Sweden) SWE	Said Atié (from (Sweden) Qviding)
12	GK	(Estonia) EST	Siim-Sten Palm (from Kuressaare)
15	MF	(Estonia) EST	Sander Sinilaid (from Kuressaare)
16	FW	(Estonia) EST	Kaspar Paur (from Levadia II)
21	DF	(Estonia) EST	Joel Indermitte (from Kuressaare)
24	DF	(Estonia) EST	Karl Palatu (from Flora)
27	DF	(Estonia) EST	Dmitri Kovtunovitš (from Infonet)
34	FW	(Estonia) EST	Marten Mütt (from Kuressaare)
39	FW	(Estonia) EST	Elari Valmas (from Kuressaare)
77	MF	(Estonia) EST	Karl Johann Reitalu (from Flora II)
—	MF	(Estonia) EST	Raido Leokin (from Sillamäe Kalev II)
—	MF	(Estonia) EST	Rando Leokin (from Sillamäe Kalev II)
—	MF	(Estonia) EST	Rasmus Tomson (from Tammeka)

Out:

No.	Pos.	Nation	Player
1	GK	(Estonia) EST	Mihhail Lavrentjev (to Sillamäe Kalev)
2	DF	(Estonia) EST	Teet Allas (retired)
4	DF	(Estonia) EST	Mait Nõmme (to HÜJK Emmaste)
10	FW	(Estonia) EST	Tiit Tikenberg (to Tulevik)
16	DF	(Estonia) EST	Meelis Peitre
17	FW	(Estonia) EST	Lauri Varendi
22	MF	(Georgia (country)) GEO	Tengiz Eteria
26	MF	(Estonia) EST	Karel Voolaid (retired)
27	DF	(Estonia) EST	Tõnis Vanna
28	FW	(Estonia) EST	Jaan Leimann

=== Tammeka ===
In:

No.	Pos.	Nation	Player
10	MF	(Estonia) EST	Reio Laabus (from Flora)
12	GK	(Estonia) EST	Andrus Lukjanov (from Ganvix)
—	FW	(Estonia) EST	Kevin Rääbis (free agent)

Out:

No.	Pos.	Nation	Player
1	GK	(Estonia) EST	Kaido Koppel (retired)
3	DF	(Estonia) EST	Siim Sillaots (to Welco Elekter)
4	DF	(Germany) GER	Marvin Prempeh
5	MF	(Republic of the Congo) CGO	Preche Mboungou (to Lokomotiv)
7	MF	(Estonia) EST	Siim Tenno (to Trans)
11	MF	(Estonia) EST	Rasmus Tomson (to Paide Linnameeskond)
17	MF	(Croatia) CRO	Silvio Philips (to (Germany) Hellas 94)
22	DF	(Estonia) EST	Ando Hausenberg (to Tallinna Kalev)
27	FW	(Brazil) BRA	Gabriel
32	MF	(Estonia) EST	Heiko Tamm (from Levadia)

=== Narva Trans ===
In:

No.	Pos.	Nation	Player
1	GK	(Estonia) EST	Sergei Lepmets (free agent)
7	MF	(Latvia) LVA	Sergejs Mišins (from (Latvia) Daugava Rīga)
11	FW	(Russia) RUS	Aleksandr Yeliseenok (from (Russia) Piter Saint Petersburg)
13	MF	(Estonia) EST	Vladislav Fjodorov (free agent)
20	MF	(Latvia) LVA	Andrejs Siņicins (from (Latvia) Spartaks Jūrmala)
21	MF	(Estonia) EST	Siim Tenno (from Tammeka)

Out:

No.	Pos.	Nation	Player
1	GK	(Estonia) EST	Valeri Smelkov (to Lokomotiv)
5	MF	(Estonia) EST	Sergei Kazakov (retired)
10	MF	(Russia) RUS	Denis Mukhametdinov
11	MF	(Russia) RUS	Ilya Shesterkov
14	DF	(Estonia) EST	Ivan Lihhatšov (to Sillamäe Kalev II)
16	MF	(Estonia) EST	Albert Taar (to (Poland) Wisła Płock)
18	DF	(Estonia) EST	Deniss Kulikov (to Lokomotiv)
20	FW	(Estonia) EST	Aleksei Belov (to Tallinna Kalev)
21	FW	(Russia) RUS	Vitali Kutuzov (to Lokomotiv)
33	GK	(Latvia) LVA	Kristaps Dzelme (to (Latvia) Jūrmala)

== See also ==
- 2014 Meistriliiga
- 2014 Esiliiga
- 2014 Esiliiga B
