= List of Estonian football transfers summer 2015 =

This is a list of Estonian football transfers in the summer transfer window 2015 by club. Only transfers in Meistriliiga are included.

== Meistriliiga ==
=== Levadia Tallinn ===
In:

No.	Pos.	Nation	Player
7	MF	(Estonia) EST	Tarmo Kink (from Inverness Caledonian Thistle)
10	FW	(Estonia) EST	Igor Subbotin (from Mladá Boleslav)
23	DF	(Estonia) EST	Artjom Artjunin (from Brașov)

Out:

No.	Pos.	Nation	Player
7	MF	(Estonia) EST	Maksim Lipin (on loan to Narva Trans)
9	FW	(Estonia) EST	Artur Rättel (on loan to Paide Linnameeskond)
12	GK	(Russia) RUS	Aleksei Shirokov
38	DF	(Slovakia) SVK	Ivan Pecha

=== Sillamäe Kalev ===
In:

No.	Pos.	Nation	Player
83	MF	(Italy) ITA	Giorgio Russo (free agent)
99	FW	(Russia) RUS	Yevgeni Kabaev (from Persija Jakarta)

Out:

No.	Pos.	Nation	Player
6	MF	(Lithuania) LTU	Darius Miceika
70	MF	(Lithuania) LTU	Rytis Leliūga
83	MF	(Estonia) EST	Aleksandr Dubõkin (released)
89	MF	(Estonia) EST	Viktor Plotnikov (to Lokomotiv Jõhvi)

=== Flora Tallinn ===
In:

No.	Pos.	Nation	Player
31	FW	(Estonia) EST	Joonas Tamm (from Tulevik Viljandi)

Out:

No.	Pos.	Nation	Player
2	DF	(Estonia) EST	Enar Jääger (to Vålerenga)
8	MF	(Russia) RUS	Irakli Logua
13	DF	(Estonia) EST	Joosep Juha (on loan to Paide Linnameeskond)
14	FW	(Estonia) EST	Martin Kase (on loan to Tulevik Viljandi)
29	FW	(Finland) FIN	Sakari Tukiainen (on loan to Tulevik Viljandi)
38	MF	(Estonia) EST	Karl-Eerik Luigend (on loan to Paide Linnameeskond)

=== Nõmme Kalju ===
In:

No.	Pos.	Nation	Player
12	MF	(Estonia) EST	Stanislav Goldberg (from Box Hill United)
23	DF	(Bosnia and Herzegovina) BIH	Borislav Topić (from Jedinstvo Bihać)

Out:

No.	Pos.	Nation	Player
27	DF	(France) FRA	Nicolas Galpin

=== Infonet Tallinn ===
In:

No.	Pos.	Nation	Player
11	FW	(Russia) RUS	Vladislav Ivanov (from Mashʼal Mubarek)
12	DF	(Estonia) EST	Aleksandr Kulinitš (free agent)
21	MF	(Russia) RUS	Sergei Tumasyan (from Sochi)

Out:

No.	Pos.	Nation	Player

=== Paide Linnameeskond ===
In:

No.	Pos.	Nation	Player
1	GK	(Estonia) EST	Mihhail Kolesnikov (on loan from Flora II Tallinn)
3	DF	(Russia) RUS	Viktor Klimeev (from 1625 Liepāja)
6	MF	(Estonia) EST	Hans-Kristjan Hansberg (from Puuma Tallinn)
17	FW	(Estonia) EST	Artur Rättel (on loan from Levadia Tallinn)
19	MF	(Estonia) EST	Karl-Eerik Luigend (on loan from Flora Tallinn)
33	DF	(Estonia) EST	Märten Pajunurm (from Kuressaare)
34	DF	(Estonia) EST	Joosep Juha (on loan from Flora Tallinn)
—	DF	(Estonia) EST	Joel Indermitte (from Atarfe Industrial)

Out:

No.	Pos.	Nation	Player
12	GK	(Estonia) EST	Andrus Lukjanov
17	FW	(Estonia) EST	Aleksandr Vassiljev
19	MF	(Estonia) EST	Lauri Välja (to Tallinn C.F.)
34	DF	(Estonia) EST	Edgars Bulters
—	DF	(Estonia) EST	Raido Leokin

=== Tammeka Tartu ===
In:

No.	Pos.	Nation	Player
15	MF	(Estonia) EST	Siim Tenno (from Neumünster)
25	MF	(Estonia) EST	Eric Pärn (from Flora II Tallinn)
27	MF	(Estonia) EST	Reio Laabus (from Neumünster)

Out:

No.	Pos.	Nation	Player

=== Narva Trans ===
In:

No.	Pos.	Nation	Player
13	MF	(Estonia) EST	Maksim Lipin (on loan from Levadia Tallinn)
14	MF	(Russia) RUS	Vlasiy Sinyavskiy (from Puuma Tallinn)
17	MF	(Russia) RUS	Kirill Nesterov (free agent)
—	FW	(Russia) RUS	Georgi Arkania (from Taganrog)

Out:

No.	Pos.	Nation	Player
14	MF	(Russia) RUS	Roman Protasov (to Karelia Petrozavodsk)

=== Pärnu Linnameeskond ===
In:

No.	Pos.	Nation	Player
30	MF	(Estonia) EST	Martin Vunk (from Persija Jakarta)

Out:

No.	Pos.	Nation	Player

=== Tulevik Viljandi ===
In:

No.	Pos.	Nation	Player
9	FW	(Estonia) EST	Martin Kase (on loan from Flora Tallinn)
20	MF	(Estonia) EST	Rasmus Luhakooder (free agent)
44	FW	(Finland) FIN	Sakari Tukiainen (on loan from Flora Tallinn)

Out:

No.	Pos.	Nation	Player
3	DF	(Estonia) EST	Oskar Berggren (to Flora II Tallinn)
9	FW	(Estonia) EST	Joonas Tamm (to Flora Tallinn)

== See also ==
- 2015 Meistriliiga
- 2014–15 Estonian Cup
- 2015–16 Estonian Cup
