= List of Estonian football transfers summer 2013 =

This is a list of Estonian football transfers in the summer transfer window 2013 by club. Only transfers in Meistriliiga are included.

== Meistriliiga ==
=== Flora ===
In:

No.	Pos.	Nation	Player
1	GK	EST	Stanislav Pedõk (loan return from Narva Trans)
17	FW	SLE	Lamin Suma (from (Serbia) Jagodina)
23	MF	EST	German Šlein (from TJK Legion)
27	DF	BEL	Guram Mikadze (on loan from (Netherlands) Vitesse Arnhem)

Out:

No.	Pos.	Nation	Player
1	GK	EST	Vadim Gurnik (on loan to Kuressaare)
3	DF	EST	Märten Pajunurm (to Kuressaare)
5	DF	EST	Meelis Peitre (to Paide Linnameeskond)
15	DF	EST	Johannes Kukebal (to Tallinna Kalev)
17	FW	CIV	Adou Seka
21	GK	EST	Marko Meerits (loan return to (Netherlands) Vitesse Arnhem)
27	DF	BEL	Guram Mikadze (loan return to (Netherlands) Vitesse Arnhem)
33	MF	EST	Karl Mööl (on loan to Kuressaare)
34	DF	EST	Marten Mütt (on loan to Kuressaare)

=== Narva Trans ===
In:

No.	Pos.	Nation	Player
4	DF	RUS	Pavel Avdeev (from (Russia) Piter St. Petersburg)
8	MF	RUS	Vitali Andreev (from Järve)
10	MF	RUS	Denis Mukhametdinov (from (Russia) KAMAZ Naberezhnye Chelny)
17	MF	RUS	Dmitri Shevyakov (from (Russia) Smena-Zenit)
20	FW	EST	Aleksei Belov (from (Germany) Waren 09)
22	MF	EST	Tanel Tamberg (free agent)
27	GK	RUS	Yevgeni Ponyatovski (loan return from Jõhvi Lokomotiv)
33	GK	LVA	Kristaps Dzelme (free agent)

Out:

No.	Pos.	Nation	Player
4	DF	RUS	Stanislav Engovatov
10	MF	EST	Denis Vnukov (to Jõhvi Lokomotiv)
13	MF	EST	Aleksandr Dubõkin (to Jõhvi Lokomotiv)
20	DF	RUS	Maksim Krychanov
22	FW	LVA	Andrejs Perepļotkins (to (Latvia) Daugava Rīga)
27	GK	RUS	Yevgeni Ponyatovski
33	GK	EST	Stanislav Pedõk (loan return to Flora)

=== Levadia ===
In:

No.	Pos.	Nation	Player
2	DF	UKR	Oleksandr Volchkov (from (Moldova) Nistru Otaci)
25	FW	EST	Svjatoslav Jakovlev (from (Russia) Zenit St. Petersburg)
33	DF	EST	Dmitri Kruglov (from (Russia) Rostov)

Out:

No.	Pos.	Nation	Player
2	DF	EST	Kevin Ingermann (on loan to Tallinna Kalev)
13	MF	EST	Lauri Välja (on loan to Tallinna Kalev)
25	FW	EST	Nikita Koger (on loan to Tallinna Kalev)

=== Tammeka ===
In:

No.	Pos.	Nation	Player
11	MF	EST	Rasmus Tomson (from Tallinna Kalev)
27	FW	BRA	Gabriel (from (Brazil) Internacional)
99	FW	GUI	Ousmane Barry (loan return from (Greece) Kavala)
—	MF	EST	Valeri Šabanov (on loan from Kiviõli Irbis)
—	MF	EST	Andres Verst (on loan from Kiviõli Irbis)

Out:

No.	Pos.	Nation	Player
11	MF	CGO	Yannick Mbemba
12	DF	EST	Rauno Tutk (to Paide Linnameeskond)
27	FW	POR	Hugo Fernandes (released)
99	FW	GUI	Ousmane Barry (to (Hungary) Kecskemét)

=== Nõmme Kalju ===
In:

No.	Pos.	Nation	Player
21	MF	BRA	João Paulo (from (Germany) TuS Bodenteich)

Out:

No.	Pos.	Nation	Player
10	FW	JPN	Kōsuke Usami (on loan to Sillamäe Kalev)

=== Sillamäe Kalev ===
In:

No.	Pos.	Nation	Player
10	MF	EST	Daniil Ratnikov (from Jõhvi Lokomotiv)
13	MF	LTU	Gajus Kulbis (from (Lithuania) Banga Gargždai)
33	FW	JPN	Kōsuke Usami (on loan from Nõmme Kalju)
—	MF	EST	Raido Leokin (from Flora II)
—	MF	EST	Rando Leokin (from Flora II)

Out:

No.	Pos.	Nation	Player
10	FW	RUS	Aleksandr Bebikh (on loan to Infonet)
18	MF	RUS	Vladimir Malinin (on loan to Infonet)
22	DF	EST	Kennet Jädal (released)
—	MF	LTU	Linas Savastas (to (Lithuania) Dainava Alytus)

=== Kuressaare ===
In:

No.	Pos.	Nation	Player
3	DF	EST	Märten Pajunurm (from Flora)
17	DF	EST	Marten Mütt (on loan from Flora)
32	GK	EST	Vadim Gurnik (on loan from Flora)
33	MF	EST	Karl Mööl (on loan from Flora)

Out:

No.	Pos.	Nation	Player
5	FW	EST	Mairo Tikerberi (to Jõgeva Noorus-96)
7	FW	EST	Vladimir Gerasimov (loan return to Lasnamäe Ajax)
13	DF	EST	Rauno Reiman (to Raasiku Joker)
17	DF	EST	Andro Aavik (to Sörve)
29	MF	EST	Bert Klemmer

=== Paide Linnameeskond ===
In:

No.	Pos.	Nation	Player
7	FW	NGA	Jasper Uwaegbulam (from (Belgium) Eupen)
16	DF	EST	Meelis Peitre (from Flora)
19	DF	EST	Rauno Tutk (from Paide Linnameeskond)

Out:

No.	Pos.	Nation	Player
1	GK	EST	Martin Kaalma (to Viimsi)
7	DF	EST	Rauno Kald (to Türi Ganvix)
23	FW	EST	Karl Ivar Maar (loan return to Flora II)

=== Tallinna Kalev ===
In:

No.	Pos.	Nation	Player
2	DF	EST	Kevin Ingermann (on loan to Levadia)
8	FW	EST	Nikita Tšernei (from Ararat TTÜ)
9	FW	SRB	Stefan Tripković (from (Switzerland) Widnau)
11	DF	EST	Johannes Kukebal (on loan from Flora)
13	MF	EST	Lauri Välja (on loan from Levadia)
17	FW	EST	Nikita Koger (on loan from Levadia)
20	DF	EST	Egert Heintare (from Ararat TTÜ)
22	MF	EST	Hans-Kristjan Hansberg (from Ararat TTÜ)
—	MF	EST	Sten Teino

Out:

No.	Pos.	Nation	Player
1	GK	IRL	Gary Hogan (to (Norway) Nybergsund)
5	MF	EST	Ilja Monakov (to Tallinna Dünamo)
6	DF	GER	Yaşar Koca (to (Germany) Bergedorf 85)
9	MF	EST	Rasmus Tomson (to Tammeka)
11	FW	GER	Fatih Altundağ
13	MF	TUR	Serhat Yapıcı (to (Germany) Niendorfer TSV)
17	DF	EST	Sander Karu (released)
26	DF	EST	Elvis Liivamägi (released)
28	MF	EST	Alen Stepanjan (to (Finland) Viikingit)
32	MF	EST	Alex Sander Sepp (to Flora II)

=== Infonet ===
In:

No.	Pos.	Nation	Player
7	FW	RUS	Aleksandr Bebikh (on loan from Sillamäe Kalev)
17	MF	RUS	Oleg Valov (from (Russia) Volga Tver)
77	MF	RUS	Vladimir Malinin (on loan from Sillamäe Kalev)

Out:

No.	Pos.	Nation	Player
12	DF	FIN	Oskari Lehtonen (to (Philippines) Stallion)
17	FW	RUS	Vladislav Smirnov

== See also ==
- 2013 Meistriliiga
- 2013 Esiliiga
- 2013 Esiliiga B
