= List of Estonian football transfers summer 2014 =

This is a list of Estonian football transfers in the summer transfer window 2014 by club. Only transfers in Meistriliiga are included.

== Meistriliiga ==
=== Levadia ===
In:

No.	Pos.	Nation	Player
2	MF	(Croatia) CRO	Jan Penić (from (Germany) 1860 Rosenheim)
9	MF	(Estonia) EST	Rasmus Peetson (from Pärnu)
18	DF	(Austria) AUT	Toni Tipurić (from (Germany) Sportfreunde Siegen)
19	MF	(Estonia) EST	Aleksandr Dmitrijev (free agent)
26	MF	(Estonia) EST	Dmitri Kruglov (from (Azerbaijan) Ravan Baku)
28	FW	(Estonia) EST	Kristen Saarts (from Pärnu)

Out:

No.	Pos.	Nation	Player
2	DF	(Ukraine) UKR	Oleksandr Volchkov (on loan to Lokomotiv)
18	FW	(Lithuania) LTU	Arsenij Buinickij (to (Iceland) KA)
19	DF	(Estonia) EST	Aleksandr Kulinitš (released)
21	DF	(Estonia) EST	Aleksei Jahhimovitš (released)
25	FW	(Russia) RUS	Vladislav Ivanov (released)

=== Nõmme Kalju ===
In:

No.	Pos.	Nation	Player
2	DF	(France) FRA	Nicolas Galpin (from (France) Amiens)
21	FW	(Brazil) BRA	Felipe Nunes (free agent)
24	MF	(Estonia) EST	Eino Puri (from (Romania) Botoșani)
31	FW	(Estonia) EST	Jarmo Ahjupera (from (Hungary) Újpest)

Out:

No.	Pos.	Nation	Player
12	MF	(Bosnia and Herzegovina) BIH	Novo Papaz
24	DF	(Estonia) EST	Hindrek Ojamaa (to Tammeka)

=== Sillamäe Kalev ===
In:

No.	Pos.	Nation	Player
5	DF	(Russia) RUS	Igor Cheminava (free agent)
8	MF	(Spain) ESP	Micha (from (Spain) Deportiva Minera)
9	MF	(Ukraine) UKR	Kyrylo Silich (free agent)
13	MF	(Estonia) EST	Aleksandr Dubõkin (from (Armenia) Ararat Yerevan)

Out:

No.	Pos.	Nation	Player
8	MF	(Estonia) EST	Maksim Paponov (released)
18	MF	(Ukraine) UKR	Oleksiy Lazebnyi (on loan to Lokomotiv)
35	GK	(Russia) RUS	Artem Levizi (on loan to Tallinna Kalev)

=== Flora ===
In:

No.	Pos.	Nation	Player
21	MF	(Estonia) EST	Sergei Mošnikov (from (Kazakhstan) Kaysar Kyzylorda)

Out:

No.	Pos.	Nation	Player

=== Paide ===
In:

No.	Pos.	Nation	Player
26	MF	(Estonia) EST	Silver Kruusalu (from Flora III)

Out:

No.	Pos.	Nation	Player
4	DF	(Estonia) EST	Joel Indermitte
11	FW	(Sweden) SWE	Said Atié
28	DF	(Estonia) EST	Markus Holst (to (Switzerland) Concordia Lausanne)
30	DF	(Estonia) EST	Rauno Tutk (to Tammeka)
39	FW	(Estonia) EST	Elari Valmas (to Kuressaare)
—	MF	(Estonia) EST	Raido Leokin (to Keila)
—	MF	(Estonia) EST	Rando Leokin (to Keila)

=== Infonet ===
In:

No.	Pos.	Nation	Player
24	MF	(Estonia) EST	Albert Taar (from (Poland) Wisła Płock)
27	MF	(Estonia) EST	Artjom Dmitrijev (from (Belgium) Turnhout)

Out:

No.	Pos.	Nation	Player

=== Trans ===
In:

No.	Pos.	Nation	Player
5	MF	(Russia) RUS	Vitali Kutuzov (from Lokomotiv)
7	MF	(Russia) RUS	Andrei Ornat (from (Russia) Prialit Reutov)
8	MF	(Estonia) EST	Svjatoslav Jakovlev (from Lokomotiv)
21	MF	(Russia) RUS	Ignat Yepifanov (from (Russia) Rus Saint Petersburg)
22	MF	(Russia) RUS	Ilya Osipov (from (Russia) Rusfan)

Out:

No.	Pos.	Nation	Player
1	GK	(Estonia) EST	Sergei Lepmets (to (Finland) Hämeenlinna)
7	MF	(Latvia) LVA	Sergejs Mišins (to (Latvia) Gulbene)
11	FW	(Russia) RUS	Aleksandr Yeliseyenok (to (Russia) Piter Saint Petersburg)
21	MF	(Estonia) EST	Siim Tenno (to (Germany) VfR Neumünster)

=== Tallinna Kalev ===
In:

No.	Pos.	Nation	Player
6	MF	(Estonia) EST	Nikita Brõlin (on loan from Levadia II)
12	GK	(Russia) RUS	Artem Levizi (on loan from Sillamäe Kalev)
20	DF	(Estonia) EST	Aleksei Larin (from Järve)

Out:

No.	Pos.	Nation	Player
8	MF	(Estonia) EST	Sten Teino
10	MF	(Estonia) EST	Lauri Välja (to M.C. Tallinn)
14	MF	(Estonia) EST	Henry Niinlaub (to M.C. Tallinn)
18	DF	(Estonia) EST	Ragnar Rump
20	FW	(Estonia) EST	Aleksei Belov (to (Germany) Union Fürstenwalde)

=== Tammeka ===
In:

No.	Pos.	Nation	Player
2	DF	(Estonia) EST	Hindrek Ojamaa (from Nõmme Kalju)
5	DF	(Estonia) EST	Tanel Joosep (free agent)
14	FW	(Estonia) EST	Mario Tikerberi (on loan from Noorus-96)
25	MF	(Estonia) EST	Mihail Gutak (from Noorus-96)
28	DF	(Estonia) EST	Rauno Tutk (from Paide)

Out:

No.	Pos.	Nation	Player
10	MF	(Estonia) EST	Reio Laabus (to (Germany) VfR Neumünster)

=== Lokomotiv ===
In:

No.	Pos.	Nation	Player
6	MF	(Russia) RUS	Stanislav Yablokov (from (Russia) Pskov-747 Pskov)
7	MF	(Estonia) EST	Dmitri Jegorov (on loan from Levadia II)
15	MF	(Ukraine) UKR	Oleksiy Lazebnyi (on loan from Sillamäe Kalev)
17	FW	(Russia) RUS	Aleksandr Nikulin (free agent)
18	DF	(Ukraine) UKR	Oleksandr Volchkov (on loan from Levadia)

Out:

No.	Pos.	Nation	Player
4	DF	(Estonia) EST	Valeri Kurlõtškin (to Puuma)
5	MF	(Republic of the Congo) CGO	Maxime Mboungou
6	MF	(Russia) RUS	Anton Vasilev
7	MF	(Russia) RUS	Vitali Kutuzov (to Trans)
17	MF	(Estonia) EST	Svjatoslav Jakovlev (to Trans)
23	FW	(Latvia) LVA	Rihards Ivanovs (to (Latvia) Rēzeknes BJSS)
25	DF	(Latvia) LVA	Bogdans Ņesterenko (to (Latvia) Olaine)

== See also ==
- 2014 Meistriliiga
