= 2021 Meistriliiga =

29th season of the Meistriliiga

Meistriliiga
- Season: 2021
- Dates: 13 March – 5 December 2021
- Champions: FCI Levadia (10th title)
- Relegated: Tulevik
- Champions League: FCI Levadia
- Europa Conference League: Flora; Paide Linnameeskond (via Estonian Cup)
- Matches: 156
- Goals: 518 (3.32 per match)
- Top goalscorer: Henri Anier (26 goals)
- Biggest home win: Flora 9–0 Tammeka (27 October 2021)
- Biggest away win: Vaprus 1–7 Nõmme Kalju (19 May 2021)
- Highest scoring: Flora 9–0 Tammeka (27 October 2021)
- Longest winning run: 9 matches FCI Levadia; Flora
- Longest unbeaten run: 16 matches Flora
- Longest winless run: 12 matches Tammeka
- Longest losing run: 9 matches Vaprus

The 2021 Meistriliiga, also known as A. Le Coq Premium Liiga for sponsorship reasons, was the 31st season of the Meistriliiga, the top Estonian league for association football clubs. The season was scheduled to begin on 5 March 2021, but was delayed due to COVID-19 pandemic until 13 March and concluded on 5 December.

Flora were the defending champions. The title was decided in the last round match between Flora and FCI Levadia. FCI Levadia drew the game, holding on to their one-point lead over Flora and winning their 10th Meistriliiga title, their first since 2014.

== Teams ==
Ten teams were competing in the league, nine clubs from the 2020 season and 2020 Esiliiga champions Vaprus who had earned a promotion after a two-year absence. Vaprus were to be relegated at the end of the 2021 season after finishing in the bottom of the table, however 8th Tulevik chose voluntary relegation to due financial difficulties. Tammeka retained their Meistriliiga spot after winning a relegation playoff against Esiliiga runners-up Tallinna Kalev.

=== Venues ===
Locations of the 2021 Meistriliiga teams

| Team | Location | Stadium | Capacity |
|---|---|---|---|
| Flora | Tallinn | A. Le Coq Arena | 14,336 |
| Kuressaare | Kuressaare | Kuressaare linnastaadion | 1,000 |
| Legion | Tallinn | Kadrioru staadion | 4,750 |
| FCI Levadia | Tallinn | A. Le Coq Arena | 14,336 |
| Narva Trans | Narva | Narva Kreenholm Stadium | 1,065 |
| Nõmme Kalju | Tallinn | Kadrioru staadion | 4,750 |
| Nõmme Kalju | Tallinn | Sportland Arena | 1,161 |
| Paide Linnameeskond | Paide | Paide linnastaadion | 1,000 |
| Tammeka | Tartu | Tartu Tamme Stadium | 1,500 |
| Tulevik | Viljandi | Viljandi linnastaadion | 1,084 |
| Vaprus | Pärnu | Pärnu Rannastaadion | 1,501 |

=== Personnel and kits ===
| Team | Manager | Captain | Kit manufacturer | Shirt sponsor |
|---|---|---|---|---|
| Flora | (Estonia) Jürgen Henn | (Estonia) Konstantin Vassiljev | Nike | Optibet |
| Kuressaare | (Ukraine) Roman Kozhukhovskyi | (Estonia) Sander Seeman | Nike | |
| Legion | (Estonia) Denis Belov | (Estonia) Pavel Londak | Uhlsport | |
| FCI Levadia | (Serbia) Marko Savić (Estonia) Vladimir Vassiljev | (Estonia) Brent Lepistu | Adidas | Viimsi Keevitus |
| Narva Trans | (Russia) Igor Pyvin | (Ivory Coast) Irié | Nike | Sportland |
| Nõmme Kalju | (Russia) Sergei Frantsev | (Estonia) Aleksandr Kulinitš | Adidas | Rämmar |
| Paide Linnameeskond | (Estonia) Vjatšeslav Zahovaiko | (Estonia) Andre Frolov | Nike | Verston |
| Tammeka | (Latvia) Dmitrijs Kalašņikovs | (Estonia) Karl Johan Pechter | Nike | Metec |
| Tulevik | (Estonia) Sander Post | (Estonia) Kaimar Saag | Joma | Fenix |
| Vaprus | (Estonia) Taavi Midenbritt | (Estonia) Magnus Villota | Nike | Coolbet |

=== Managerial changes ===
| Team | Outgoing manager | Manner of departure | Date of vacancy | Position in table | Incoming manager | Date of appointment |
|---|---|---|---|---|---|---|
| Tulevik | (Estonia) Sander Post | Resigned | 6 December 2020 | Pre-season | (Estonia) Jaanus Reitel | 6 December 2020 |
| Nõmme Kalju | (Estonia) Marko Kristal | Resigned | 7 December 2020 | Pre-season | (Russia) Sergei Frantsev | 7 December 2020 |
| Narva Trans | (Estonia) Oleg Kurotškin | End of contract | 6 December 2020 | Pre-season | (Russia) Igor Pyvin | 3 January 2021 |
| Tammeka | (Estonia) Kaido Koppel | Sacked | 1 September 2021 | 10th | (Latvia) Dmitrijs Kalašņikovs | 1 September 2021 |
| Tulevik | (Estonia) Jaanus Reitel | Mutual consent | 20 September 2021 | 8th | (Estonia) Sander Post | 20 September 2021 |

== Format changes ==
Due to delayed season opening and many postponed matches, the season was shortened. Instead of the regular format of each team playing each of the other teams four times, the league table will be split after the third playthrough (27th match) into two sections of top 6 and bottom 4, with each team playing each other in that section.

== League table ==
| Pos | Team | Pld | W | D | L | GF | GA | GD | Pts | Qualification or relegation |
|---|---|---|---|---|---|---|---|---|---|---|
| 1 | FCI Levadia (C) | 32 | 25 | 3 | 4 | 84 | 38 | +46 | 78 | Qualification for the Champions League preliminary round |
| 2 | Flora | 32 | 23 | 8 | 1 | 90 | 23 | +67 | 77 | Qualification for the Europa Conference League first qualifying round (Note: Paide Linnameeskond qualified for the Europa Conference League first qualifying round by winning the 2021–22 Estonian Cup.) |
| 3 | Paide Linnameeskond | 32 | 18 | 8 | 6 | 66 | 35 | +31 | 62 | Qualification for the Europa Conference League first qualifying round |
| 4 | Nõmme Kalju | 32 | 13 | 6 | 13 | 57 | 44 | +13 | 45 | |
| 5 | Legion | 32 | 11 | 7 | 14 | 49 | 48 | +1 | 40 | |
| 6 | Narva Trans | 32 | 9 | 6 | 17 | 36 | 61 | −25 | 33 | |
| 7 | Kuressaare | 30 | 10 | 4 | 16 | 39 | 47 | −8 | 34 | |
| 8 | Tulevik (R) | 30 | 9 | 3 | 18 | 39 | 62 | −23 | 30 | Relegation to Esiliiga (Note: On 22 December 2021 Tulevik announced voluntary relegation due to financial difficulties.) |
| 9 | Tammeka (O) | 30 | 7 | 4 | 19 | 34 | 72 | −38 | 25 | Qualification for relegation play-offs |
| 10 | Vaprus | 30 | 5 | 3 | 22 | 24 | 88 | −64 | 18 | |

Source: Estonian Football Association (in Estonian), UEFA
Rules for classification: 1) Points; 2) Less matches awarded against; 3) Head-to-head points; 4) Head-to-head goal difference; 5) Matches won; 6) Goal difference; 7) Goals scored; 8) Away goals scored; 9) Fairplay ranking.
(C) Champions; (O) Play-off winners; (R) Relegated

== Results ==
A total of four rounds will be played. In the first three rounds teams play each other three times. In the fourth round the league was split into 2 groups – top 6, and bottom 4, where they play each team in their group one more time.

=== Rounds 1–18 ===
Teams play each other twice, once at home and once away.

| Home \ Away | FLO | KUR | LEG | LEV | NAR | NÕM | PAI | TAM | TUL | VAP |
|---|---|---|---|---|---|---|---|---|---|---|
| Flora | | 2–2 | 2–1 | 0–0 | 5–0 | 1–0 | 3–3 | 9–0 | 3–0 | 2–0 |
| Kuressaare | 0–4 | | 1–1 | 2–3 | 1–2 | 0–2 | 2–2 | 1–3 | 2–3 | 2–1 |
| Legion | 1–2 | 1–0 | | 2–3 | 0–0 | 0–1 | 1–1 | 3–1 | 2–1 | 7–1 |
| FCI Levadia | 2–4 | 3–0 | 4–3 | | 3–2 | 4–1 | 0–4 | 2–1 | 4–1 | 5–0 |
| Narva Trans | 0–2 | 2–0 | 0–0 | 1–4 | | 1–2 | 0–1 | 2–1 | 6–2 | 1–1 |
| Nõmme Kalju | 1–2 | 0–3 | 3–1 | 0–1 | 0–1 | | 0–0 | 4–1 | 5–1 | 0–1 |
| Paide | 0–0 | 1–0 | 1–0 | 1–2 | 5–1 | 2–1 | | 1–1 | 0–1 | 2–1 |
| Tammeka | 0–3 | 0–1 | 0–1 | 1–2 | 3–2 | 2–2 | 0–2 | | 1–1 | 2–2 |
| Tulevik | 3–3 | 1–2 | 1–0 | 0–4 | 0–1 | 1–3 | 0–1 | 5–3 | | 3–1 |
| Vaprus | 0–4 | 2–1 | 1–4 | 0–4 | 2–1 | 1–7 | 1–3 | 1–2 | AWD (Note: Win awarded to Vaprus due to Tulevik fielding an unregistered player. The original match had ended in a 0–1 defeat.) | |

Source: Estonian Football Association (in Estonian)
Legend: Blue = home team win; Yellow = draw; Red = away team win.

=== Rounds 19–27 ===
Teams play each other once, either home or away.

| Home \ Away | FLO | KUR | LEG | LEV | NAR | NÕM | PAI | TAM | TUL | VAP |
|---|---|---|---|---|---|---|---|---|---|---|
| Flora | | | 5–1 | | 5–2 | 2–0 | | 3–0 | | |
| Kuressaare | 1–0 | | 0–2 | | | 0–2 | | 2–0 | 1–0 | 6–0 |
| Legion | | | | 1–2 | | | 1–2 | | 3–1 | 2–1 |
| FCI Levadia | 1–5 | 3–0 | | | 3–0 | 2–1 | | 4–0 | | 5–0 |
| Narva Trans | | 2–2 | 0–3 | | | | | | 1–0 | 3–0 |
| Nõmme Kalju | | | 2–2 | | 1–1 | | 3–2 | | 3–1 | |
| Paide | 1–1 | 4–1 | | 0–3 | 4–0 | | | | 3–1 | |
| Tammeka | | | 0–2 | | 2–1 | 0–3 | 2–5 | | | |
| Tulevik | 2–2 | | | 3–2 | | | | 4–1 | | 1–0 |
| Vaprus | 0–6 | | | | | 1–4 | 1–1 | 1–2 | | |

Source: Estonian Football Association (in Estonian)
Legend: Blue = home team win; Yellow = draw; Red = away team win.

=== Top six rounds 28–32 ===
Teams play each other once, either home or away.

| Home \ Away | FLO | LEG | LEV | NAR | NÕM | PAI |
|---|---|---|---|---|---|---|
| Flora | | | 2–2 | | | 3–0 |
| Legion | 0–2 | | | 0–2 | 2–2 | |
| FCI Levadia | | 2–2 | | | | 1–0 |
| Narva Trans | 0–2 | | 0–2 | | 0–0 | 1–5 |
| Nõmme Kalju | 0–1 | | 1–2 | | | |
| Paide | | 4–0 | | | 5–3 | |

Updated to match(es) played on 4 December 2021. Source: Estonian Football Association (in Estonian)
Legend: Blue = home team win; Yellow = draw; Red = away team win.

=== Bottom four rounds 28–30 ===
Teams play each other once, either home or away.

| Home \ Away | KUR | TAM | TUL | VAP |
|---|---|---|---|---|
| Kuressaare | | | | |
| Tammeka | 1–0 | | 2–0 | 2–3 |
| Tulevik | 0–2 | | | |
| Vaprus | 0–4 | | 1–2 | |

Source: Estonian Football Association (in Estonian)
Legend: Blue = home team win; Yellow = draw; Red = away team win.

== Relegation play-offs ==
At season's end Tammeka, the ninth place club, participated in a two-legged play-off with the runners-up (of independent teams) of the 2021 Esiliiga, for the spot in 2022 Meistriliiga.

27 November 2021
16:00 (UTC+2)

| Tallinna Kalev | 0–0 | Tammeka |
|---|---|---|
| | Report |

Kalev Keskstaadion artificial turf, Tallinn
Attendance: 125
Referee: Joonas Jaanovits
4 December 2021
13:00 (UTC+2)

| Tammeka | 3–0 | Tallinna Kalev |
|---|---|---|
| Koskor 33'; Veelma 34'; Uljanov 87' | Report |

Sepa Football Centre artificial turf, Tartu
Attendance: 211
Referee: Juri Frischer

Tammeka won 3–0 on aggregate.

== Statistics ==
=== Top goalscorers ===
| Rank | Player | Club | Goals |
|---|---|---|---|
| 1 | (Estonia) Henri Anier | Paide Linnameeskond | 26 |
| 2 | (Georgia (country)) Zakaria Beglarishvili | FCI Levadia | 24 |
| 3 | (Estonia) Rauno Sappinen | Flora | 23 |
| 4 | (Estonia) Robert Kirss | FCI Levadia | 17 |
| 5 | (Estonia) Sergei Zenjov | Flora | 14 |
| 6 | (Estonia) Kaimar Saag | Tulevik | 12 |
| 7 | (Estonia) Tristan Koskor | Tammeka | 11 |
| 7 | (Estonia) Mattias Männilaan | Kuressaare | 11 |
| 7 | (Estonia) Aleksandr Šapovalov | Legion | 11 |
| 10 | (Russia) Aleksandr Zakarlyuka | Narva Trans | 10 |

=== Hat-tricks ===
| Player | For | Against | Result | Date |
|---|---|---|---|---|
| (Georgia (country)) Zakaria Beglarishvili | FCI Levadia | Tulevik | 4–0 (A) | 4 April 2021 |
| (Estonia) Eduard Golovljov | Narva Trans | Tulevik | 6–2 (H) | 11 April 2021 |
| (Russia) Aleksandr Zakarlyuka | Narva Trans | Tulevik | 6–2 (H) | 11 April 2021 |
| (Estonia) Henri Anier | Paide Linnameeskond | Vaprus | 3–1 (A) | 25 April 2021 |
| (Estonia) Aleksandr Šapovalov | Legion | Vaprus | 7–1 (A) | 11 May 2021 |
| (Estonia) Henri Anier | Paide Linnameeskond | Tammeka | 5–2 (A) | 19 September 2021 |
| (Estonia) Rauno Sappinen^{4} | Flora | Narva Trans | 5–2 (H) | 22 September 2021 |
| (Estonia) Sergei Zenjov | Flora | Tammeka | 9–0 (H) | 27 October 2021 |
| (Estonia) Henri Anier | Paide Linnameeskond | Legion | 4–0 (H) | 30 October 2021 |
| (Estonia) Otto-Robert Lipp | Kuressaare | Vaprus | 4–0 (A) | 6 November 2021 |

Notes
^{4}Player scored four goals
(H) – Home team
(A) – Away team

=== Average attendance ===
Most of the season was played under audience restrictions due to the pandemic. Different teams played a different number of games in front of spectators.

| Club | Average attendance |
|---|---|
| Pärnu JK Vaprus | 495 |
| Tallinna FC Flora | 472 |
| FCI Levadia | 305 |
| Viljandi JK Tulevik | 296 |
| Paide Linnameeskond | 233 |
| Tartu JK Tammeka | 226 |
| Nõmme Kalju FC | 192 |
| FC Kuressaare | 139 |
| JK Narva Trans | 122 |
| Tallinna JK Legion | 91 |
| League average | 273 |

== Awards ==
=== Monthly awards ===
| Month | Player of the Month | | Manager of the Month | |
| Month | Player | Club | Manager | Club |
|---|---|---|---|---|
| March/April | (Estonia) Henri Anier | Paide Linnameeskond | (Estonia) Vjatšeslav Zahovaiko | Paide Linnameeskond |
| May | (Georgia (country)) Zakaria Beglarishvili | FCI Levadia | (Estonia) Jürgen Henn | Flora |
| June/July | (Estonia) Robert Kirss | FCI Levadia | (Serbia) Marko Savić (Estonia) Vladimir Vassiljev | FCI Levadia |
| August | (Estonia) Joseph Saliste | Paide Linnameeskond | (Serbia) Marko Savić (Estonia) Vladimir Vassiljev | FCI Levadia |
| September | (Estonia) Rauno Alliku | Flora | (Ukraine) Roman Kozhukhovskyi | Kuressaare |
| October | (Estonia) Ken Kallaste | Flora | (Estonia) Vjatšeslav Zahovaiko | Paide Linnameeskond |
| November | (Georgia (country)) Zakaria Beglarishvili | FCI Levadia | (Estonia) Jürgen Henn | Flora |

=== Annual awards ===
The Meistriliiga Player of the Year was awarded to Rauno Sappinen.
