= 2004 Esiliiga =

Estonian football league season for second division

Esiliiga
- Season: 2004

In the 2004 season of the Esiliiga, the second-tier league of the Estonian football league system, the Tammeka team finished in top position. Tammeka, Tervis and Dünamo won promotion to the Meistriliiga and no team was relegated to the II Liiga.

== Final table of Esiliiga season 2004 ==
Pos	Team	Pld	W	D	L	GF	GA	GD	Pts	Promotion or qualification
1	Tammeka (C, P)	28	17	7	4	74	34	+40	58	Promotion to Meistriliiga
2	Levadia II (Note: Reserve teams are ineligible for promotion.)	28	17	6	5	75	37	+38	57	
3	Tervis	28	18	2	8	70	50	+20	56	
4	Dünamo (P)	28	12	2	14	49	67	−18	38	Qualification for promotion play-offs
5	Kuressaare (P)	28	11	2	15	56	70	−14	35	Promotion to Meistriliiga
6	Estel	28	10	2	16	66	66	0	32	
7	TVMK II	28	8	3	17	46	54	−8	27	
8	TJK	28	5	4	19	29	87	−58	19	Qualification for relegation play-offs

Source: RSSSF
Rules for classification: 1) points; 2) head-to-head points; 3) head-to-head goal difference; 4) head-to-head goals scored; 5) goal difference; 6) number of goals scored.
(C) Champions; (P) Promoted

== Promotion playoff ==
13 November 2004

Dünamo	1 – 2	Lootus
Butajev 44'		Popov 30'; Ametov 90+3'

20 November 2004

Lootus	0 – 4	Dünamo
		Tšernpussov 8'; Krivošein 32'; Butajev 65'; Semko 76'

JK Dünamo Tallinn beat FC Lootus Alutaguse 5–2 on aggregate. Dünamo promoted to Meistriliiga, Lootus relegated to Esiliiga.

== Relegation play-off ==
7 November 2004

FC Puuma Tallinn	0 – 1	TJK

13 November 2004

TJK	3 – 1	FC Puuma Tallinn

Tallinna Jalgpalliklubi beat FC Puuma Tallinn 4–1 on aggregate. TJK stayed in Esiliiga, Puuma in Second Division.

== Topscorers ==
Pos	Name	Team	Goals
1	Oliver Konsa	JK Tammeka Tartu	25
2	Mihhail Ištšuk	JK Tervis Pärnu	18
3	Konstantin Butajev	JK Dünamo Tallinn	17
4	Aleksei Titov	F.C.A. Estel Tallinn	14
5	Martti Pukk	FC Kuressaare	13

== See also ==
- 2004 Meistriliiga
