= 2015–16 Estonian Cup =

Estonian football competition

Tournament details
- Country: Estonia
- Teams: 103

Final positions
- Champions: Flora Tallinn
- Runners-up: Sillamäe Kalev

Tournament statistics
- Matches played: 101
- Goals scored: 631 (6.25 per match)

The 2015–16 Estonian Cup was the 26th season of the Estonian main domestic football knockout tournament. The cup holders, Nõmme Kalju, were knocked out in the Quarter-Finals by Sillamäe Kalev. Flora won their seventh title after defeating JK Sillamäe Kalev 3–0 in the final.

The winner of the Cup were to qualify for the first qualifying round of the 2016–17 UEFA Europa League, but as Flora were already qualified for the Champions League as 2015 Meistriliiga champions the spot passed to Infonet.

== First round ==
The draw was made by Estonian Football Association on 30 May 2015, on the half time of the 2014–15 final of the same competition.

- League level of the club in the brackets.
- Rahvaliiga (RL) is a league organized by Estonian Football Association, but not part of the main league system.

Home team	Score	Away team
8 June
FC Kose (4)	0–4	(1) Tartu JK Tammeka
10 June
FC Jõgeva Wolves (6)	1–2	(RL) FC Like & Share
Lasnamäe FC Ajax (4)	1–4	(2) Tallinna FC Flora II
FC Elva (3)	3–4	(4) Tallinn C.F.
FC Kuressaare (2)	20–0	(RL) JK Rapla Lokomotiv
Harju Jalgpallikool (6)	1–5	(2) Tallinna FC Infonet II
Tallinna FC Castovanni Eagles (5)	0–2	(4) Tallinna JK Piraaja
13 June
SK Eestimaa Kasakad (5)	0–14	(1) JK Narva Trans
Tallinna FC Infonet (1)	36–0	(RL) Virtsu Jalgpalliklubi
14 June
JK Tallinna Kalev (2)	1–2	(3) HÜJK Emmaste
20 June
SK Imavere Forss (4)	6–2	(6) Tallinna FC Twister
22 June
JK Kernu Kadakas (5)	0–8	(1) Tallinna FC Levadia
27 June
Tartu Ülikool Fauna (5)	2–3	(5) Nõmme Kalju FC III
Türi JK Ganvix (4)	3–1	(6) Viimsi FC Igiliikur
Navi Vutiselts (5)	4–0	(5) Valga FC Warrior
SK Tääksi (5)	10–1	(RL) FC IceBears
SK Noorus 96 Jõgeva (4)	9–1	(6) Tallinna JK Jalgpallihaigla
28 June
Tallinna Depoo (6)	2–4	(5) Vastseliina FC Tannem
Tallinna FC Soccernet (5)	2–1	(RL) FC Puhkus Mehhikos
Maardu FC United (5)	4–3	(5) Narva United FC
JK Roosad Pantrid (RL)	0–5	(6) Tartu FC Bronx Wood
FC Lelle (5)	1–0	(RL) FC Moe
Pärnu JK Poseidon Nirvaana (6)	3–2	(RL) Rumori Calcio
Raasiku Valla FC (6)	1–7	(4) Tõrva JK
Tallinna FC Olympic Olybet (5)	2–0	(RL) JK Pedajamäe
Tallinna FC Reaal (6)	1–2	(6) JK Väätsa Vald
Pirita Reliikvia (5)	5–0	(6) FC Helios
JK Kaitseliit Kalev (5)	12–1	(RL) JK Küsimärk
29 June
Viljandi JK Tulevik (1)	2–1	(4) Keila JK
30 June
Rapla JK Atli (5)	2–6	(4) Pärnu FC Metropool
Paide Linnameeskond (1)	31–0	(RL) JK Raudteetöölised
1 July
Raasiku FC Joker (3)	3–4 (a.e.t.)	(4) Kuusalu JK Rada
Tallinna FC Eston Villa (6)	2–1	(5) FC Tartu
4 July
FC Nõmme United (4)	9–1	(RL) Kohtla-Nõmme
RJK Märjamaa (6)	2–1	(RL) FC TransferWise
SK Roosu (6)	4–1	(4) Tabasalu JK Charma
5 July
JK Retro (5)	7–5	(RL) FC Peedu
7 July
Tallinna FC Forza (5)	w/o^{1}	(4) Saue JK Laagri
26 July
Maardu FC Starbunker (3)	3–0	(3) Tallinna FC Flora III

Notes

- Note 1: Saue JK Laagri withdrew from the competition.

=== Byes ===
These teams were not drawn and secured a place in the second round without playing:

- Meistriliiga (Level 1): Nõmme Kalju FC, Tallinna FC Flora, JK Sillamäe Kalev, Pärnu Linnameeskond,
- Esiliiga (2): Tartu FC Santos, Rakvere JK Tarvas
- Esiliiga B (3): Kohtla-Järve JK Järve,
- II Liiga (4): Tartu JK Welco, Tallinna JK Legion, Viimsi MRJK,
- III Liiga (5): Maardu FC Starbunker II, JK Loo, FC Järva-Jaani, Ambla Vallameeskond, Tallinna SK Dnipro, JK Tallinna Kalev III, Tartu FC Merkuur, FC Otepää, EMÜ SK, Läänemaa JK Haapsalu,
- IV Liiga (6): Tabivere RSK, Tallinna Jalgpalliselts,
- Rahvaliiga (RL): Õismäe Torm, Lootos FCR, JK Fellin

== Second round ==
The draw for the second round was made on 30 June 2015.

Home team	Score	Away team
19 July
JK Tallinna Kalev III (5)	1–0	(5) JK Loo
26 July
JK Väätsa Vald (6)	3–0	(5) Maardu FC Starbunker II
Tartu FC Bronx Wood (6)	1–3	(4) Viimsi MRJK
Tartu FC Merkuur (5)	4–2 (a.e.t.)	(4) Kuusalu JK Rada
Tallinna FC Forza (5)	7–2	(6) SK Roosu
28 July
JK Fellin (RL)	1–5	(5) EMÜ SK
29 July
Tallinna Jalgpalliselts (6)	0–13	(1) Paide Linnameeskond
Nõmme Kalju FC III (5)	4–1	(5) FC Otepää
Kohtla-Järve JK Järve (3)	0–0 (a.e.t.) (3–4 p)	(4) Tõrva JK
Pärnu Linnameeskond (1)	1–0	(5) Läänemaa JK Haapsalu
FC Lelle (5)	0–2	(5) Vastseliina FC Tannem
Maardu United (5)	1–4	(2) Tallinna FC Infonet II
SK Noorus 96 Jõgeva (4)	1–4	(4) Pärnu FC Metropool
Tallinna FC Soccernet (5)	4–2	(RL) FC Like & Share
2 August
HÜJK Emmaste (3)	6–0	(RL) Õismäe Torm
Türi JK Ganvix (4)	3–4	(4) FC Nõmme United
4 August
Tartu FC Santos (2)	11–0	(6) Pärnu JK Poseidon Nirvaana
5 August
Tabivere RSK (6)	0–0 (a.e.t.) (4–2 p)	(5) Pirita Reliikvia
FC Järva-Jaani (5)	1–2	(5) Navi Vutiselts
Tartu JK Tammeka (1)	5–1	(3) Maardu FC Starbunker
Tallinna SK Dnipro (5)	0–3	(4) Tartu JK Welco
11 August
Tallinna FC Flora II (2)	1–3	(1) Tallinna FC Flora
Tallinna FC Levadia (1)	14–0	(5) Tallinna FC Olympic
Viljandi JK Tulevik (1)	7–0	(5) JK Kaitseliit Kalev
Tallinna FC Infonet (1)	8–0	(4) Tallinna JK Piraaja
Nõmme Kalju FC (1)	3–0	(4) Tallinn C.F.
Rakvere JK Tarvas (2)	10–0	(5) Ambla Vallameeskond
Lootos FCR (RL)	0–12	(5) JK Retro
12 August
RJK Märjamaa (6)	1–6	(1) JK Sillamäe Kalev
Tallinna JK Legion (4)	1–5	(6) Tallinna FC Eston Villa
16 August
FC Kuressaare (2)	4–2	(5) SK Tääksi
25 August
JK Narva Trans (1)	12–0	(4) SK Imavere Forss

== Third round ==
The draw for the third round was made on 13 August 2015.

Home team	Score	Away team
3 September
JK Retro (5)	2–1	(5) Nõmme Kalju FC III
FC Nõmme United (4)	8–0	(4) Pärnu FC Metropool
Tallinna FC Eston Villa (6)	2–3	(4) Viimsi MRJK
4 September
Tartu FC Santos (2)	3–3 (a.e.t.) (4–2 p)	(2) FC Kuressaare
6 September
JK Sillamäe Kalev (1)	4–3	(1) Paide Linnameeskond
Rakvere JK Tarvas (2)	0–4	(5) Tallinna FC Forza
Navi Vutiselts (5)	3–1	(5) JK Tallinna Kalev III
Vastseliina FC Tannem (5)	5–0	(5) Tallinna FC Soccernet
8 September
Tabivere RSK (6)	4–7	(6) JK Väätsa Vald
EMÜ SK (5)	1–1 (a.e.t.) (2–4 p)	(4) Tõrva JK
29 September
Tallinna FC Infonet II (2)	0–3	(1) Pärnu Linnameeskond
Tallinna FC Levadia (1)	13–1	(5) Tartu FC Merkuur
JK Narva Trans (1)	1–2 (a.e.t.)	(1) Nõmme Kalju FC
Tartu JK Welco (4)	0–2	(1) Tallinna FC Flora
30 September
Tartu JK Tammeka (1)	1–0	(3) HÜJK Emmaste
4 October
Viljandi JK Tulevik (1)	2–1	(1) Tallinna FC Infonet

== Fourth round ==
The draw for the fourth round was made on 1 October 2015.

- JK Väätsa Vald, currently playing in the 6th level of Estonian football, is the lowest ranked club remaining.

Home team	Score	Away team
20 October
JK Sillamäe Kalev (1)	1–0	(1) Tallinna FC Levadia
Tallinna FC Flora (1)	17–0	(5) JK Retro
21 October
Tallinna FC Forza (5)	6–2	(6) JK Väätsa Vald
27 October
Viljandi JK Tulevik (1)	0–5	(1) Nõmme Kalju FC
28 October
FC Nõmme United (4)	2–3	(2) Tartu FC Santos
1 November
Navi Vutiselts (5)	0–7	(4) Tõrva JK
8 November
Viimsi MRJK (4)	4–0	(5) Vastseliina FC Tannem
10 November
Pärnu Linnameeskond (1)	1–2	(1) Tartu JK Tammeka

== Quarter-finals ==
The draw was made on 1 March 2016.

Tallinna FC Forza and Tõrva JK, currently playing in the 4th level of Estonian football, are the lowest ranked clubs remaining.

12 April 2016	Sillamäe Kalev (1)	1–0	(1) Nõmme Kalju	Sillamäe
18:00 (UTC+3)	Lipin 18'	Report		Stadium: Sillamäe Kalevi Stadium; Attendance: 260; Referee: Eiko Saar

12 April 2016	Tartu Tammeka (1)	2–0	(4) Tõrva	Tartu
19:00 (UTC+3)	Koskor 2', 12'	Report		Stadium: Tamme Stadium; Attendance: 212

13 April 2016	Viimsi (3)	6–1	(4) Forza Tallinn	Haabneeme
19:00 (UTC+3)	Kane 16'; Kaljumäe 35', 64'; Pajula 39'; Kesküla 77', 81'	Report	Tšigrinov 85'	Stadium: Viimsi Stadium; Attendance: 155

13 April 2016	Flora Tallinn (1)	3–1	(2) Santos Tartu	Tallinn
19:00 (UTC+3)	Sappinen 14'; Jürgenson 62' (pen.); Beglarishvili 90'	Report	Aaviste 89'	Stadium: A. Le Coq Arena; Attendance: 111

== Semi-finals ==
The draw was made on 14 April 2016.

3 May 2016	Flora Tallinn (1)	2–0	(1) Tartu Tammeka	Tallinn
19:00 (UTC+3)	Jürgenson 50' (pen.); Gussev 63'	Report		Stadium: A. Le Coq Arena; Attendance: 161; Referee: Kristo Külljastinen

4 May 2016	Sillamäe Kalev (1)	2–0	(3) Viimsi	Sillamäe
19:00 (UTC+3)	Panov 43'; Volkov 77'	Report		Stadium: Sillamäe Kalevi Stadium; Attendance: 205; Referee: Roomer Tarajev

== Final ==
21 May 2016	Flora Tallinn (1)	3–0 (a.e.t.)	(1) Sillamäe Kalev	Tallinn
16:00 UTC+3	Sappinen 102'; Gussev 105+1'; Tukiainen 107'	Report		Stadium: A. Le Coq Arena; Attendance: 2,085; Referee: Eiko Saar

== See also ==
- 2015 Meistriliiga
- 2015 Esiliiga
- 2015 Esiliiga B
