= Albert Prosa =

Estonian footballer (born 1990)

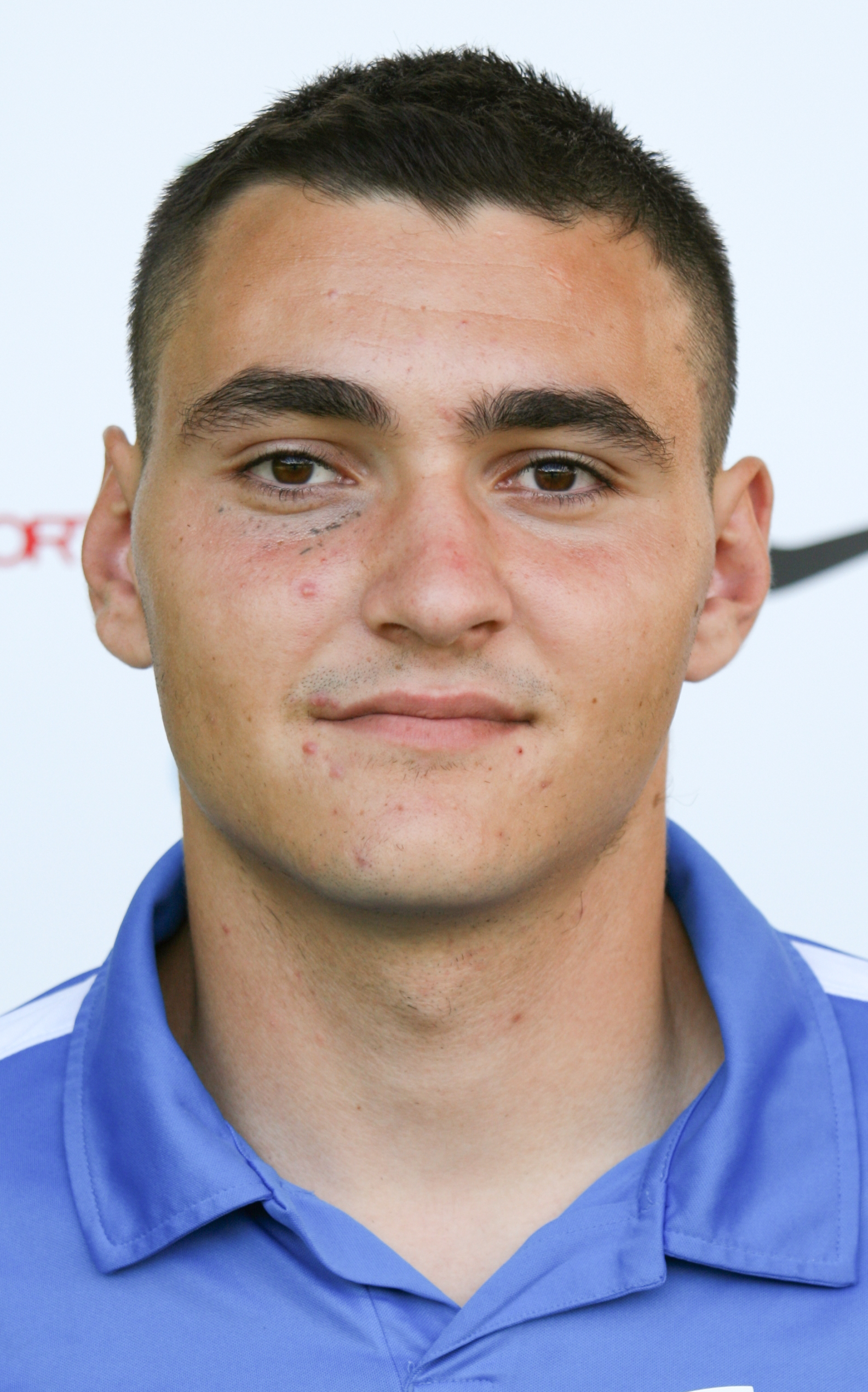
- Prosa in 2011

Personal information
- Full name: Albert Prosa
- Date of birth: 1 October 1990 (age 36)
- Place of birth: Tartu, Estonia
- Height: 1.79 m (5 ft 10 1/2 in)
- Position: Forward

Team information
- Current team: Tallinna JK Puuma
- Number: 19

Youth career
- 2002–2007: Tammeka

Senior career*
Years	Team	Apps	(Gls)
2007	Maag Tammeka III	18	(26)
2006–2009	Tammeka II	35	(17)
2008–2011	Tammeka	113	(42)
2011–2016	Flora U21	8	(7)
2011–2016	Flora	126	(61)
2016	RoPS	10	(2)
2017	FCI Tallinn U21	1	(0)
2017	FCI Tallinn	35	(27)
2018	Valletta	10	(3)
2018	TPS	8	(1)
2019	Tammeka	10	(3)
2020–2021	Legion	20	(1)
2022	Cosmos FC	16	(44)
2023-	JK Puuma	66	(110)

International career^{‡}
2006	Estonia U17	3	(0)
2008–2009	Estonia U19	14	(2)
2010–2012	Estonia U21	11	(2)
2010–2014	Estonia U23	5	(0)
2011–2017	Estonia	7	(1)
- * Club domestic league appearances and goals as of 18 November 2025 ‡ National team caps and goals as of 19 November 2018

Albert Prosa (born 1 October 1990) is an Estonian professional footballer who plays as a forward.

== Club career ==
=== Tammeka ===
Prosa began playing football for local club Tammeka. He made his debut in the Meistriliiga on 15 March 2008, in a 1–2 home loss to TVMK. In July 2011, Prosa had a trial at Borussia Dortmund, but failed to secure a contract with the German champions. He scored 22 goals in 33 matches in the 2011 season.

=== Flora ===
On 24 November 2011, Prosa signed three-year contract with Meistriliiga club Flora. Prosa won the Meistriliiga title in the 2015 season. On 20 July 2016, Prosa's contract was terminated by mutual agreement. He scored 61 goals in 126 in the Meistriliiga for Flora.

=== RoPS ===
On 12 August 2016, Prosa signed for Veikkausliiga club RoPS until the end of the 2016 season.

=== FCI Tallinn ===
On 1 February 2017, Prosa signed a one-year contract with Meistriliiga club FCI Tallinn. He made his debut for FCI Tallinn on 26 February, in the Estonian Supercup match against Flora, and scored twice in his side's 5–0 victory. On 27 May 2017, Prosa scored the second goal of a 2–0 victory over Tammeka in the Estonian Cup final. He was joint top scorer in the Meistriliiga in the 2017 season, alongside Rauno Sappinen, with 27 goals.

=== Valletta ===
On 6 December 2017, Prosa signed a one-and-a-half-year contract with Maltese Premier League club Valletta.

=== TPS ===
On 8 August 2018, Prosa signed for Veikkausliiga club TPS until the end of the season. He left the club at the end of 2018.

=== Tammeka ===
Prosa joined Tartu JK Tammeka on 11 February 2019 on a contract for the rest of the year.

== International career ==
Prosa made an unofficial debut for Estonia on 25 May 2011, in a non-FIFA match against Basque Country. He made his official senior debut on 19 June 2011, in a 0–4 loss to Chile in a friendly. Prosa scored his first international goal on 6 January 2016, in a 1–1 friendly draw against Sweden.

=== International goals ===
As of 25 December 2017. Estonia score listed first, score column indicates score after each Prosa goal.

International goals by date, venue, cap, opponent, score, result and competition
No.	Date	Venue	Cap	Opponent	Score	Result	Competition
1	6 January 2016	Armed Forces Stadium, Abu Dhabi, United Arab Emirates	5	Sweden	1–0	1–1	Friendly

== Honours ==
=== Club ===
Flora

- Meistriliiga: 2015
- Estonian Cup: 2012–13, 2015–16
- Estonian Supercup: 2014, 2016

FCI Tallinn

- Estonian Cup: 2016–17
- Estonian Supercup: 2017

Valletta

- Maltese Premier League: 2017–18
- Maltese FA Trophy: 2017–18

=== Individual ===
- Meistriliiga Player of the Month: March 2014
- Meistriliiga top scorer: 2017
