= Olli Kangaslahti =

Finnish former footballer (born 1972)

Personal information
- Date of birth: 2 February 1972 (age 54)
- Place of birth: Masku, Finland
- Height: 1.87 m (6 ft 2 in)
- Position: Forward

Youth career
- 1982–1984: VG-62
- 1988–1989: TPS

Senior career*
Years	Team	Apps	(Gls)
1990	Turun Pallo	4	(1)
1990	Pallo-Iirot	16	(8)
1991–1992	TPS	27	(4)
1993	Helsingør IF	2	(0)
1993	Haka	4	(1)
1994	TPV	11	(2)
1994	FinnPa	3	(0)
1995	Helsingin Ponnistus	24	(7)
1996	VPS	14	(2)
1996	→ Närpes Kraft (loan)	5	(2)
1997	Ilves	6	(3)
1998	MP	22	(13)
1999	TPV	2	(0)
1999	Jazz	8	(1)
1999	Mikkeli	8	(4)
2000–2001	TPS	38	(12)
2002	Volgar Astrakhan	0	(0)
2003	MaPS	15	(4)
2005	ÅIFK	6	(5)
2008	TuTo	6	(1)
2009	VG-62	9	(4)
2012	Boda	14	(6)
2013	VG-62	14	(4)

International career
- Finland U16
- Finland U17

Managerial career
- 2013–2015: VG-62
- 2022–2023: Inter Turku (sporting director)
- * Club domestic league appearances and goals

Olli Kangaslahti (born 2 February 1972) is a Finnish football coach and a former professional footballer who played as a forward. While playing for TPV in 1994, they won the Finnish championship title. Besides in his native Finland, he also played in Denmark and Russia.

In 1995, Kangaslahti had a short trial with English Football League club Carlisle United, appearing on the pitch and conducting the club's half-time Golden Gamble prize draw, but no move ever materialised.

After his playing career, Kangaslahti has coached in VG-62 and worked as a sporting director of Veikkausliiga club Inter Turku.

== Personal life ==
His son Oliver is a professional footballer who plays for Jaro in Veikkausliiga.

== Honours ==
TPV

- Veikkausliiga: 1994
