= Oliver Kangaslahti =

Finnish footballer (born 2000)

Personal information
- Full name: Oliver Aleksi Kangaslahti
- Date of birth: 1 May 2000 (age 26)
- Place of birth: Finland
- Height: 1.88 m (6 ft 2 in)
- Position: Centre back

Team information
- Current team: Tammeka
- Number: 20

Youth career
- –2018: Inter Turku

Senior career*
| Years | Team | Apps | (Gls) |
| 2017–2019 | Inter Turku II | 6 | (2) |
| 2020 | AC Kajaani | 5 | (0) |
| 2021 | MP | 21 | (2) |
| 2022 | HIFK | 6 | (0) |
| 2023–2024 | Inter Turku II | 46 | (13) |
| 2025–2026 | Jaro | 5 | (0) |
| 2026– | Tammeka | 31 | (2) |
- * Club domestic league appearances and goals as of 17 November 2026

Oliver Kangaslahti (born 1 May 2000) is a Finnish footballer who plays as a centre back for Meistriliiga club Tartu JK Tammeka.

== Club career ==
Kangaslahti started football in the youth sector of Inter Turku and made his senior debut with the club's reserve team in 2017. Later he has played for AC Kajaani and Mikkelin Palloilijat in the second-tier Ykkönen and for HIFK and FF Jaro in Veikkausliiga.

On 25 January 2025, he signed for newly promoted Veikkausliiga club FF Jaro for the 2025 season.

On 27 January 2026, he signed a two-year contract for Meistriliiga club Tartu JK Tammeka.

== Personal life ==
His father Olli Kangaslahti is a football coach and a former player.
