= Oliver Konsa =

Estonian footballer

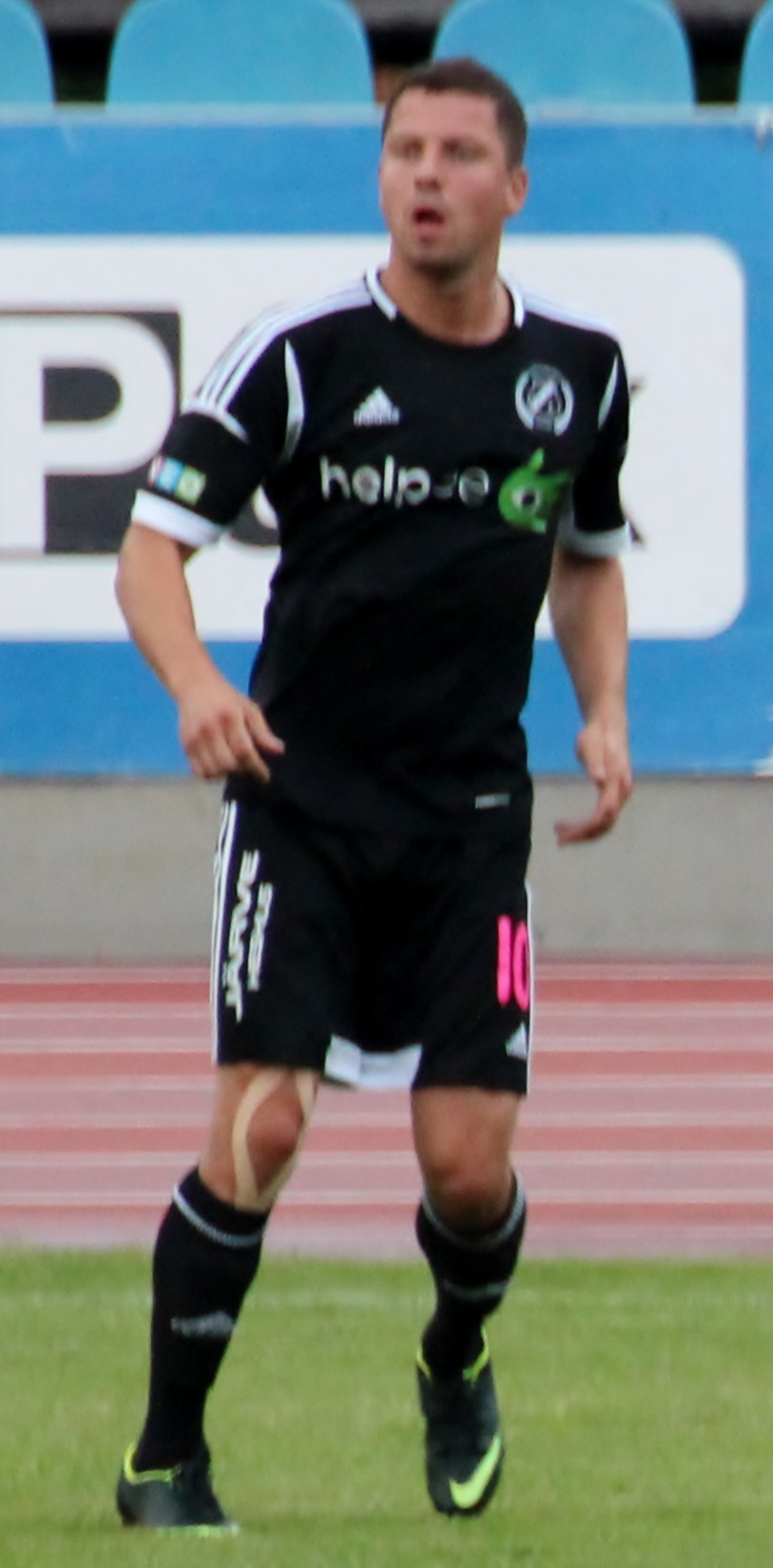
- Konsa in 2012

Personal information
- Full name: Oliver Konsa
- Date of birth: 4 March 1985 (age 41)
- Place of birth: Tartu, then part of Estonian SSR, Soviet Union
- Height: 1.83 m (6 ft 0 in)
- Positions: Winger; forward

Youth career
- –2004: JK Tammeka Tartu

Senior career*
Years	Team	Apps	(Gls)
2001–2006	JK Tammeka Tartu	128	(53)
2007–2008	FC TVMK Tallinn	47	(17)
2008–2010	FC Flora Tallinn	54	(14)
2008–2009	FC Flora II Tallinn	4	(2)
2010–2012	JK Nõmme Kalju	84	(12)
2015–2016	FC Myllypuro		
2016–2018	FC Spartak Vuosaari		
Total		317+	(98+)

International career^{‡}
- Estonia U21
2007–2012	Estonia	20	(0)
- * Club domestic league appearances and goals as of 11 November 2012 ‡ National team caps and goals as of 3 June 2012

Oliver Konsa (born 4 March 1985) is an Estonian former professional footballer. He played the position of striker.

== Club career ==
=== Arrest ===
His contract with JK Nõmme Kalju was suspended after being arrested in suspicion of drug-related crimes. On 27 September 2013 he pleaded guilty to those crimes. He was released on 9 January 2014 based on settlement.

He went on to resume his career before retiring in 2018.

=== Statistics ===
As of 11 November 2012.

Season	League	Team	First team		Reserve team	
Season	League	Team	Games	Goals	Games	Goals
2001	II.W/S	JK Tammeka Tartu	5	3	0	0
2002	EL	JK Tammeka Tartu	18	3	0	0
2003	EL	JK Tammeka Tartu	26	6	0	0
2004	EL	JK Tammeka Tartu	26	25	0	0
2005	ML	JK Tammeka Tartu	23	4	0	0
2006	ML	JK Tammeka Tartu	30	12	0	0
2007	ML	FC TVMK Tallinn	30	12	0	0
2008	ML	FC TVMK Tallinn	17	5	0	0
2008	ML	FC Flora Tallinn	7	2	3	2
2009	ML	FC Flora Tallinn	31	8	1	0
2010	ML	FC Flora Tallinn	16	4	0	0
2010	ML	JK Nõmme Kalju	24	1	0	0
2011	ML	JK Nõmme Kalju	28	3	1	0
2012	ML	JK Nõmme Kalju	32	8	0	0

== International career ==
He made his national team debut, alongside Gert Kams and Siim Roops, on 3 February 2007 against Poland, when he came on as a substitute in the second half.
