= Stanislav Prins =

Estonian footballer

Personal information
- Full name: Stanislav Prins
- Date of birth: 6 June 1988 (age 38)
- Place of birth: Donetsk, Ukrainian SSR
- Height: 1.87 m (6 ft 1 1/2 in)
- Position: Goalkeeper

Youth career
- 1996–2006: Pärnu JK

Senior career*
Years	Team	Apps	(Gls)
2005–2007	Pärnu Vaprus	51	(0)
2007–2014	Flora	98	(0)
2007–2014	→ Flora II	34	(0)
2013	→ Trans (loan)	15	(0)

International career^{‡}
	Estonia U19	6	(0)
	Estonia U21	24	(0)
2010–2012	Estonia U23	3	(0)
2012	Estonia	1	(0)
- * Club domestic league appearances and goals as of 6 February 2014 ‡ National team caps and goals as of 28 June 2013

Stanislav Prins (formerly Stanislav Pedõk, born 6 June 1988) is a former Estonian professional footballer. In 2014 Prins was given a four-year ban for match-fixing. He last played in Estonian Meistriliiga for Flora. He plays the position of goalkeeper and is 1.87 m tall. He also earned one cap in Estonia national football team.

== Career ==
=== Club career ===
Prins was born in Donetsk Oblast. He started his career with Estonian first division team JK Vaprus Pärnu. He made 50 appearances for JK Vaprus Pärnu before eventually moving to then 7-time Estonian champions, FC Flora Tallinn, where he was a backup for Mihkel Aksalu until the end of the 2009 season. In 2010, he became the first-choice and played in 27 league games. The next season, he fell down the pecking order and was shadowed by youngster Marko Meerits for the first half of the season, but again regained his position when Meerits was bought by Vitesse Arnhem.

On 28 February 2013, he joined another Meistriliiga side, Narva Trans, on loan until 1 July 2013.

=== International career ===
Pedõk made his first appearance for Estonia in an unofficial match against Spanish autonomous community Murcia, when he came on as a late substitute. A year later he was called up for a friendly against Angola on 30 December 2009, but was an unused substitute. He then had to wait another two and a half years for a new opportunity, as he was called up for a friendly against Oman. He then finally got his first official cap for the men's national team on 8 November 2012, when he came on as a 76th-minute substitute in that match to help the team win 2–1.

=== Honours ===
With FC Flora Tallinn:

- Estonian Top Division (2) – 2010, 2011
- Estonian Cup (3) – 2007–08, 2008–09, 2010–11
- Estonian Supercup (3) – 2009, 2011, 2012

== Personal ==
He has an older brother, Maksim Pedõk, who played for JK Vaprus Pärnu in 2006.
