= Igor Pyvin =

Russian footballer and coach

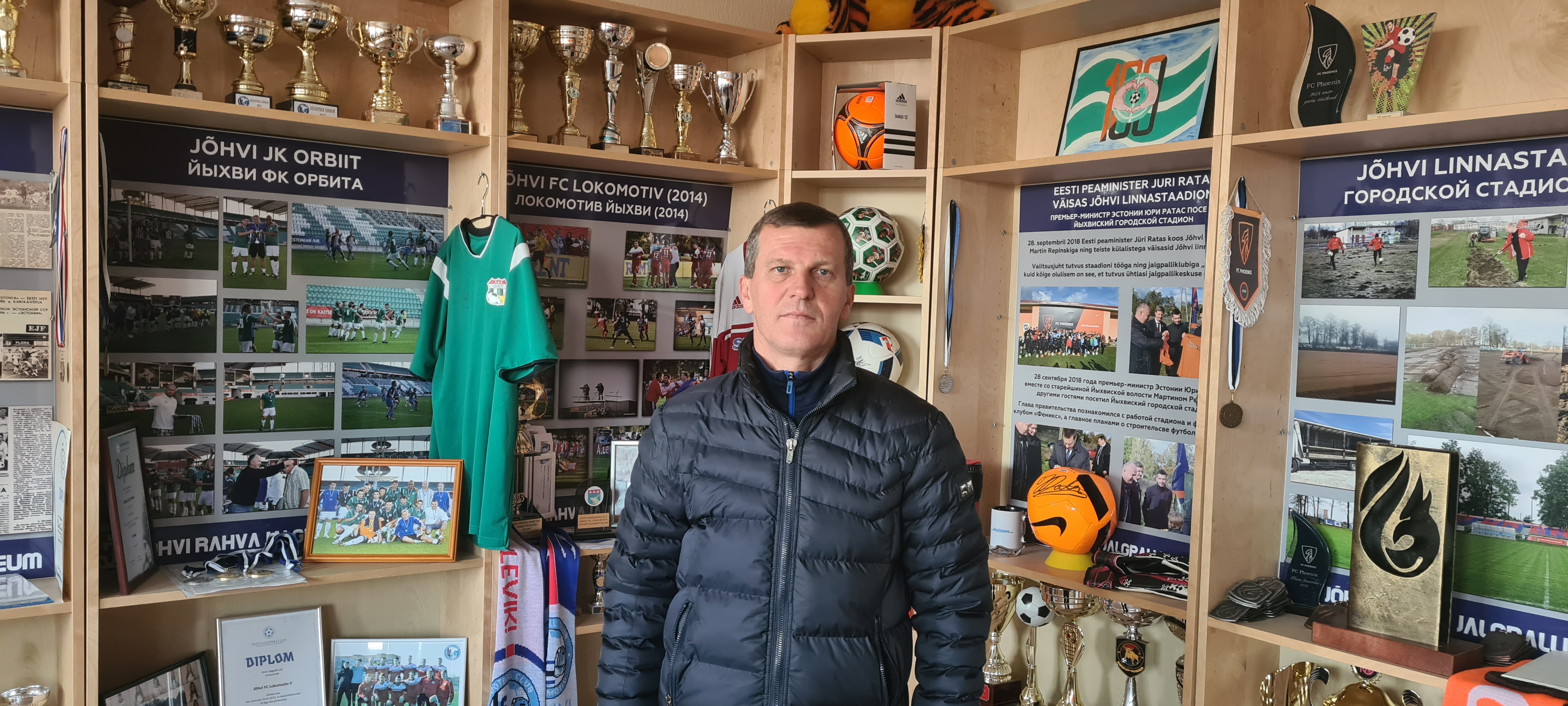

Personal information
- Full name: Igor Vyacheslavovich Pyvin
- Date of birth: 4 August 1967 (age 59)
- Place of birth: Voronezh, Russian SFSR
- Height: 1.80 m (5 ft 11 in)
- Positions: Striker; midfielder; defender

Senior career*
Years	Team	Apps	(Gls)
1984–1985	FC Strela Voronezh	26	(3)
1989–1990	FC Khimik Semiluki	69	(2)
1991	FC Buran Voronezh	41	(10)
1992	FC Elektronika Voronezh		
1992–1995	FC Fakel Voronezh	57	(4)
1995	Strindheim IL		
1996–2002	FC Lokomotiv Liski	243	(32)
2005–2007	FC Lokomotiv Liski	77	(7)

Managerial career
- 2007–2016: FC Lokomotiv Liski
- 2016–2017: FC Lokomotiv-2 Liski
- 2017: FC Zenit Penza
- 2019: FC Fakel Voronezh
- 2021: Narva Trans
- 2022: FC Znamya Truda Orekhovo-Zuyevo (assistant)
- 2022: FC Znamya Truda Orekhovo-Zuyevo (caretaker)
- * Club domestic league appearances and goals

Igor Vyacheslavovich Pyvin (Russian: Игорь Вячеславович Пывин; born 4 August 1967) is a Russian professional football coach and a former player.

== Playing career ==
As a player, he made his debut in the Soviet Second League in 1984 for FC Strela Voronezh.
