= Kaarel Kiidron =

Estonian footballer

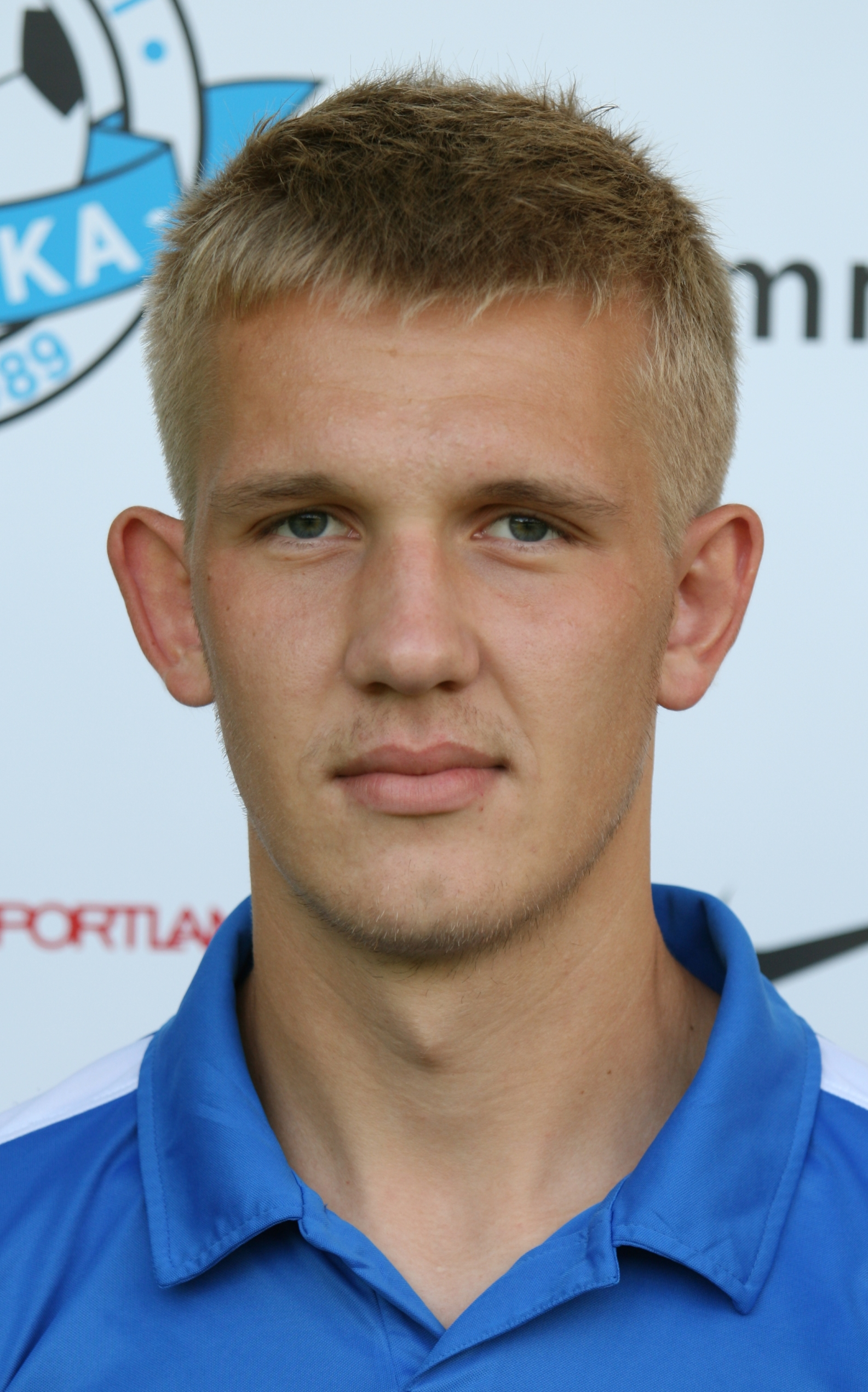
- Kiidron in 2011

Personal information
- Date of birth: 30 April 1990 (age 36)
- Place of birth: Urvaste, Estonia
- Height: 1.90 m (6 ft 3 in)
- Position: Defender

Youth career
- –2006: Lootos

Senior career*
Years	Team	Apps	(Gls)
2006	Lootos	13	(4)
2007–2008	Tammeka III	8	(1)
2008–2009	Tammeka II	6	(1)
2009–2012	Tammeka	82	(7)
2012	→ Viktoria Žižkov (loan)	10	(0)
2012–2014	Viktoria Žižkov	25	(1)
2014–2017	Tammeka	86	(10)

International career
2011–2012	Estonia U-21	5	(0)
2012–2013	Estonia U-23	2	(0)
2012	Estonia	1	(0)
- * Club domestic league appearances and goals

Kaarel Kiidron (born 30 April 1990) is a retired Estonian footballer who last played in Estonia for JK Tammeka Tartu, as a defender.

== Career ==
Kaarel Kiidron began his career with FC Lootos Põlva.

In 2007, he moved to JK Tammeka Tartu. He rose through the youth ranks, and made his Meistriliiga debut on 14 April 2009.

He was loaned to Viktoria Žižkov in 2012. At the end of the season he signed a two-year contract with the club.

On January 17, 2014, he terminated the contract with Viktoria Žižkov on a mutual consent.

In the middle of February 2014, he took up the position of first team manager in his first pro-team Tammeka. He is also registered as a player in the Tammeka first team, being able to play in the Meistriliiga, when called upon.

== International career ==
On 23 May 2012, Kiidron was added to the squad to face Croatia after Alo Bärengrub's injury. The player was surprisingly in Tarmo Rüütli's starting eleven, gaining his first cap for Estonia.
