= Maksim Lipin =

Estonian footballer (born 1992)

Personal information
- Date of birth: 17 March 1992 (age 34)
- Place of birth: Tallinn, Estonia
- Position: Midfielder

Senior career*
Years	Team	Apps	(Gls)
2011	FC Kiviõli Irbis	15	(3)
2011	FC Puuma Tallinn	12	(3)
2012–2014	FCI Tallinn	96	(31)
2015	FCI Levadia Tallinn	5	(0)
2015	→ FCI Levadia U21 (loan)	5	(0)
2015	→ JK Narva Trans (loan)	5	(1)
2016–2017	JK Sillamäe Kalev	48	(7)
2018	PS Kemi	18	(1)
2019–2020	Legion Tallinn	44	(10)

International career^{‡}
2013–2014	Estonia U21	9	(2)
2015–2016	Estonia U23	3	(0)
- * Club domestic league appearances and goals as of 10:01, 18 January 2020 (UTC) ‡ National team caps and goals as of 21 June 2020

Maksim Lipin (born 17 March 1992) is an Estonian professional footballer who plays as a midfielder.

== Club career ==
Lipin has played for FC Kiviõli Irbis, FC Puuma Tallinn, FCI Tallinn, FCI Levadia Tallinn, FCI Levadia U21, JK Narva Trans, JK Sillamäe Kalev and PS Kemi. He left PS Kemi at the end of the 2018 season, returning to Estonia with Legion Tallinn.

== International career ==
He played for Estonia at under-21 and under-23 youth levels.
