= Tallinn C.F. =

Estonian football club

- Full name: Tallinn Club de Fútbol
- Nickname: TCF
- Founded: 2015
- Ground: Wismari Staadion, Tallinn
- Manager: Sergei Ratnikov
- 2015: II liiga E/N, 5th
Home colours	Away colours

Tallinn Club de Futbol was an Estonian football club from Tallinn. They played in the II liiga, the fourth highest level of Estonian football league pyramid.

== Current squad ==
As of 27 May 2015.

Note: Flags indicate national team as defined under FIFA eligibility rules; some limited exceptions apply. Players may hold more than one non-FIFA nationality.

No.	Pos.	Nation	Player
—	GK	EST	Egert Oiov
—	GK	EST	Silver Saluste
—	DF	EST	Kevin Arike
—	DF	EST	Andreas Aru
—	DF	EST	Andre Arus
—	DF	EST	Oliver Heliste
—	DF	EST	Sten Kuks
—	DF	EST	Daniel Lumiste
—	DF	EST	Taavi Maiste
—	DF	EST	Bruno Roosnurm
—	DF	EST	Sten Anders Rätsnik
—	DF	EST	Juss Tanvel
—	DF	EST	Richard Vald
—	MF	EST	Kevin Ingermann

No.	Pos.	Nation	Player
—	MF	EST	Ants Jaakson
—	MF	EST	Henry Niinlaub
—	MF	EST	Juhan Noode
—	MF	EST	Andero Pebre
—	MF	EST	Lauri Välja
—	MF	EST	Jörgen Roosaar
—	MF	EST	Kevin Sooaluste
—	MF	EST	Mihkel Tiit
—	MF	EST	Eduard Ratnikov
—	MF	EST	Ian-Erik Valge
—	FW	EST	Rejal Alijev
—	FW	EST	Kimmo Ploompuu
—	FW	EST	Marten Saarlas
—	FW	EST	Teet Kallaste
—	FW	EST	Edwin Stüf
