= Tristan Koskor =

Estonian footballer (born 1995)

Personal information
- Full name: Tristan Koskor
- Date of birth: 28 November 1995 (age 30)
- Place of birth: Tartu, Estonia
- Height: 1.91 m (6 ft 3 in)
- Position: Forward

Team information
- Current team: Tammeka
- Number: 19

Youth career
- 2005–2010: Tartu Olümpia
- 2011–2012: Tammeka

Senior career*
Years	Team	Apps	(Gls)
2012–2013	Tammeka II	30	(4)
2015–2017	Tammeka	53	(5)
2017	Paide Linnameeskond U21	4	(6)
2017	Paide Linnameeskond	6	(1)
2017	Tammeka U21	1	(0)
2017–2019	Tammeka	56	(30)
2019	Fylkir	0	(0)
2019–2021	Tammeka	72	(28)
2022	Flora	9	(2)
2022–2023	Peyia	11	(0)
2023	Narva Trans	33	(16)
2024	ASD Asti	9	(1)
2024–	Tammeka	63	(18)

International career^{‡}
2016	Estonia U21	2	(0)
2018	Estonia U23	1	(0)
2019	Estonia	2	(0)
- * Club domestic league appearances and goals as of 17 November 2026 ‡ National team caps and goals as of 1 September 2024

Tristan Koskor (born 28 November 1995) is an Estonian professional footballer who plays as a forward for Meistriliiga club Tartu JK Tammeka.

== Career ==
In March 2019, he briefly joined Pepsi Max League club Fylkir in Iceland.

In 2024, Koskor finished the season with Italian club ASD Asti, after which he decided to return to home town joining Tartu JK Tammeka.

== International career ==
Koskor made his senior international debut for Estonia on 11 January 2019, replacing Henri Anier in the 74th minute of a 2–1 friendly win over Finland.

== Honours ==
Individual

- Meistriliiga Top Score: 2023
