= Meelis Peitre =

Estonian footballer

Personal information
- Date of birth: 27 March 1990 (age 36)
- Place of birth: Tallinn, then part of Estonian SSR, Soviet Union
- Height: 1.76 m (5 ft 9 1/2 in)
- Position: Left back

Team information
- Current team: Paide Linnameeskond III

Senior career*
Years	Team	Apps	(Gls)
2007–2008	Warrior Valga	62	(14)
2009–2013	Flora	48	(1)
2009–2010	→ Flora II	49	(2)
2013–2016	Paide Linnameeskond	47	(0)
2017	Keila	0	(0)
2019–	Paide Linnameeskond III	6	(0)

International career
2011	Estonia	2	(0)
- * Club domestic league appearances and goals as of 16 December 2019

Meelis Peitre (born 27 March 1990) is an Estonian footballer who plays for Paide Linnameeskond III, as a left back.

== Career ==
Born Tallinn, Peitre has played club football for Warrior Valga, Flora, Flora II, Paide Linnameeskond and Keila.

He made his international debut for Estonia in 2011.
