= Oleksiy Lazebnyi =

Ukrainian footballer (born 1993)

Personal information
- Full name: Oleksiy Lazebnyi Oleksiyovych
- Date of birth: 6 May 1993 (age 33)
- Place of birth: Chernihiv, Ukraine
- Height: 1.80 m (5 ft 11 in)
- Position: Midfielder

Youth career
- 2008: SDYuShOR Desna

Senior career*
Years	Team	Apps	(Gls)
2010–2011	Skala Stryi	11	(0)
2012–2013	YSB Chernihiv (amateurs)	9	(2)
2013–2014	Sillamäe Kalev	17	(2)
2014	Jõhvi FC Phoenix	4	(0)
2014–	Vranov nad Topľou	11	(0)
2014–2015	Sillamäe Kalev	1	(0)
- * Club domestic league appearances and goals as of 13 November 2022

Oleksiy Lazebnyi (Ukrainian: Лазебний Олексій Олексійович; born in Chernihiv 6 May 1993) is a Ukrainian footballer who plays as a midfielder.

== Career ==
Oleksiy Lazebnyi was a product of Desna Chernihiv, he started in 2008 in the youth academy SDYuShOR Desna. In 2010 he moved to Skala Stryi in Ukrainian Second League and in 2012 he moved to YSB Chernihiv in Ukrainian Amateur Football Championship. Here in 2012, he won the Chernihiv Oblast Football Cup. In 2014 he moved to Sillamäe Kalev in Estonia, where he got 2nd in Meistriliiga in the season 2014. In summer 2014 he moved to Jõhvi FC Phoenix and then moved to Vranov nad Topľou in 3. Liga in Slovakia, where he got 5th the season season 2014–15 where he played 11 matches.

== Honours ==
YSB Chernihiv

- Chernihiv Oblast Football Cup: 2012

Sillamäe Kalev

- Meistriliiga: Runner-Up 2014
