= Siim Tenno =

Estonian footballer

Personal information
- Date of birth: 4 August 1990 (age 36)
- Place of birth: Tartu, Estonia
- Height: 1.72 m (5 ft 7 1/2 in)
- Position: Midfielder

Team information
- Current team: Tartu Kalev
- Number: 77

Senior career*
Years	Team	Apps	(Gls)
2009–2013	Tammeka	150	(8)
2012	→ Viktoria Žižkov (loan)	3	(0)
2014	Narva Trans	17	(4)
2014–2015	Neumünster	33	(0)
2015–2016	Tammeka	17	(0)
2016–2018	MTV Gifhorn	70	(4)
2018–2020	Lupo Martini Wolfsburg	32	(1)
2020–	Tartu Kalev	174	(8)

International career^{‡}
2008–2009	Estonia U19	10	(1)
2010–2012	Estonia U21	15	(0)
2010–2014	Estonia U23	4	(0)
2011–2012	Estonia	3	(0)
- * Club domestic league appearances and goals as of 17 November 2026 ‡ National team caps and goals as of 25 July 2018

Siim Tenno (born 4 August 1990) is an Estonian footballer who plays for Tartu Kalev as a midfielder.

== Club career ==
Tenno, Tartu Tammeka youth product, started his men's league career with club's third team in the II Liiga in 2007. The next season, he played 29 matches for the club's second team and was promoted to the first team for the 2009 season.

=== Viktoria Žižkov ===
In January 2012, he and teammate Kaarel Kiidron were loaned to Czech Republic club Viktoria Žižkov until the end of the season. He made the first team debut on 30 March 2012, when he came on as a late substitute.

=== Narva Trans ===
In the start of 2014 season, Tenno signed a one-year contract with Meistriliiga club Narva Trans. Before that he went on trial to 2. Bundesliga club Paderborn. Good spell in Narva helped him to sign a contract with German Regionalliga club Neumünster.

=== Neumünster ===
At the start of July, Siim Tenno was with his former teammate Reio Laabus together in VfR Neumünster and both signed contracts.

=== Tartu Tammeka ===
On 21 July 2015, Tenno rejoined Tammeka.

=== MTV Gifhorn ===
In January 2016, Tenno joined German Oberliga Niedersachsen club MTV Gifhorn.

== International career ==
He made his international debut for Estonia in 2011.

== Personal life ==
His brother, Simo, is also a footballer.
