= Tartu JK Tammeka =

Estonian football club

Tammeka
- Full name: Tartu Jalgpallikool Tammeka
- Founded: 13 June 1989; 37 years ago
- Ground: Tartu Tamme Stadium
- Capacity: 1,750
- President: Kaarel Kiidron
- Manager: Karel Voolaid
- League: Meistriliiga
- 2026: Meistriliiga, 5th of 10
- Website: http://www.jktammeka.ee
Home colours	Away colours

Tartu Jalgpallikool Tammeka, commonly known as Tartu Tammeka or simply Tammeka, is an Estonian professional football club based in Tartu that competes in Meistriliiga, the top flight of Estonian football. The club's home ground is Tamme Stadium.

Founded in 1989, Tammeka are the biggest football club in southern Estonia with over 700 members. The club has played in the Meistriliiga since the 2005 season and have never been relegated from the Estonian top division.

== History ==
=== Early years and the first decade in the Meistriliiga (1989–2013) ===
Tammeka was founded on 13 June 1989 as a youth academy by Hillar Otto, Avo Jakovits and Heino Ligi. In 2000, the club joined the Estonian football league system and began competing in the Southern division of the III liiga. Tammeka's debut season was a success as the team finished first with 46 points out of the possible 60. Tammeka was promoted to the II liiga, and in 2001, to the Esiliiga. The club established itself in the Esiliiga by placing sixth in the 2002 season and seventh in the 2003 season. Tammeka won the Esiliiga in the 2004 season and was promoted to the Meistriliiga. The team defeated Dünamo 9–0 in their first Meistriliiga match and finished their first season in the Estonian top flight in seventh place. In December 2005, Sergei Ratnikov was appointed as manager. Tammeka finished the 2006 season in sixth place.

==== Maag Tammeka ====
In 2007, Tammeka merged with city rivals Maag in an effort to establish a club in Tartu that would be able to compete with the Tallinn clubs for medals and European spots. The club was renamed as Maag Tammeka and began playing in orange shirts. Despite pooled resources, the team lost several key players and finished the 2007 season in fifth place. Ratnikov resigned in November 2007 and his assistant Sergei Zamogilnõi took over as manager. Maag Tammeka reached the 2007–08 Estonian Cup final, but lost to Flora 1–3. The team finished the 2008 season in seventh place, after which the sponsorship deal with Maag ended and Tammeka continued to operate as an independent club.

==== Establishing themselves in the top division ====
The following season, Tammeka reinstated their original name and colours, but had to operate with a smaller budget and thus lost several players. Reserve team coach Norbert Hurt was appointed as manager and several reserve team players were promoted to the first-team squad. Despite a slow start, Tammeka managed to finish the 2009 season in seventh place.

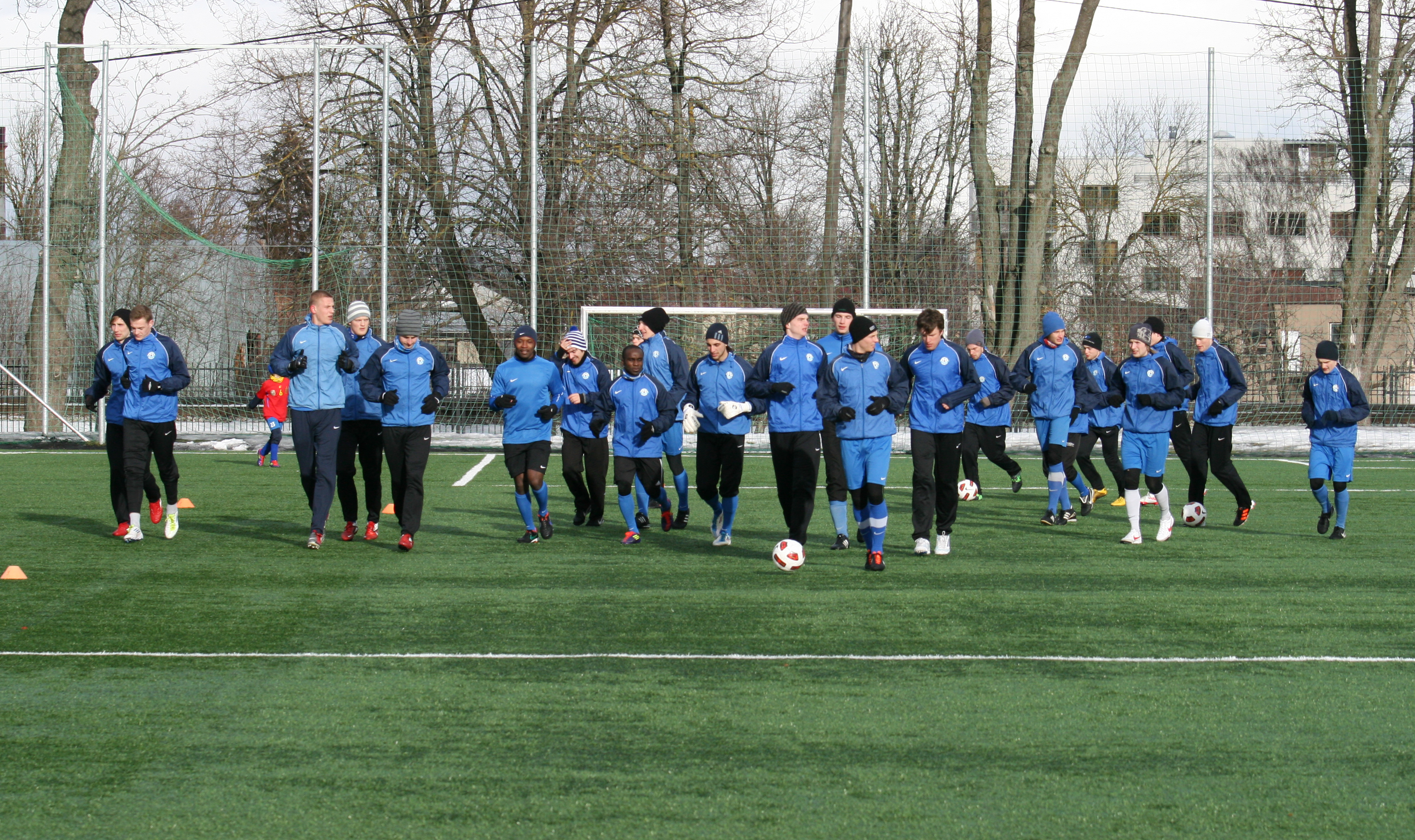
Tammeka during the 2012 pre-season

In the summer of 2009, the club was acquired by German-Iranian Babak Afshar and her wife Jane Afshar, of whom the latter was instated as the club's president. In December 2009, Marko Kristal replaced Hurt as manager. Kristal rebuilt the team around youth system players Albert Prosa, Kaarel Kiidron and Siim Tenno, finishing the 2010 season in sixth place. Despite a good start in the 2011 season, the team's performance faded in the second half of the season. In September 2011, former Tammeka player Kristjan Tiirik replaced Kristal as manager and the team finished the season in seventh place. The subsequent winter transfer window saw the departure of several key players, including Prosa, Kiidron and Tenno. Following a poor start to the 2012 season, Tiirik was replaced by Joti Stamatopoulos in July 2012. Stamatopoulos failed to make a difference and Tammeka finished the season last, amassing only 20 points. Despite finishing last, Tammeka escaped relegation as Viljandi disbanded. In January 2013, Uwe Erkenbrecher was appointed as manager. Despite growing financial troubles, Tammeka finished the 2013 season in ninth place and defeated Tarvas 6–2 on aggregate in the relegation play-offs, securing their Meistriliiga spot.

=== Troubles with Meistriliiga license and new legal entity (2014–2016) ===
By January 2014, the ongoing financial troubles had led to a situation where the club's coaches, players and employees were no longer willing to cooperate with the club's management and Tammeka's academy (Jalgpallikool Tammeka) had broken off from their parent club (Jalgpalliklubi Tammeka). On 11 January, the Estonian Football Association proposed a restructuring plan in an effort to save the club from bankruptcy, but the proposal was not accepted by the club's president Jane Afshar. On 1 February 2014, Tammeka lost their Meistriliiga license due to failing to fulfil a number of the league's licensing requirements, including failing to pay players wages and refusing the proposed restructuring plan. On 11 February, the license to compete in the top flight was granted to the team's academy Jalgpallikool Tammeka, ensuring the continuation of Tartu Tammeka under a new legal entity. Former Tammeka player Indrek Koser was appointed as manager and the team came seventh in the 2014 season. Tammeka finished the 2015 season in ninth place, but avoided relegation by defeating Tallinna Kalev 4–2 on aggregate in the relegation play-offs. The team came seventh in the 2016 season. In November 2016, Tammeka announced that Mario Hansi and Kaido Koppel would replace Koser in the coming season.

=== Top three aspirations (2017–present) ===
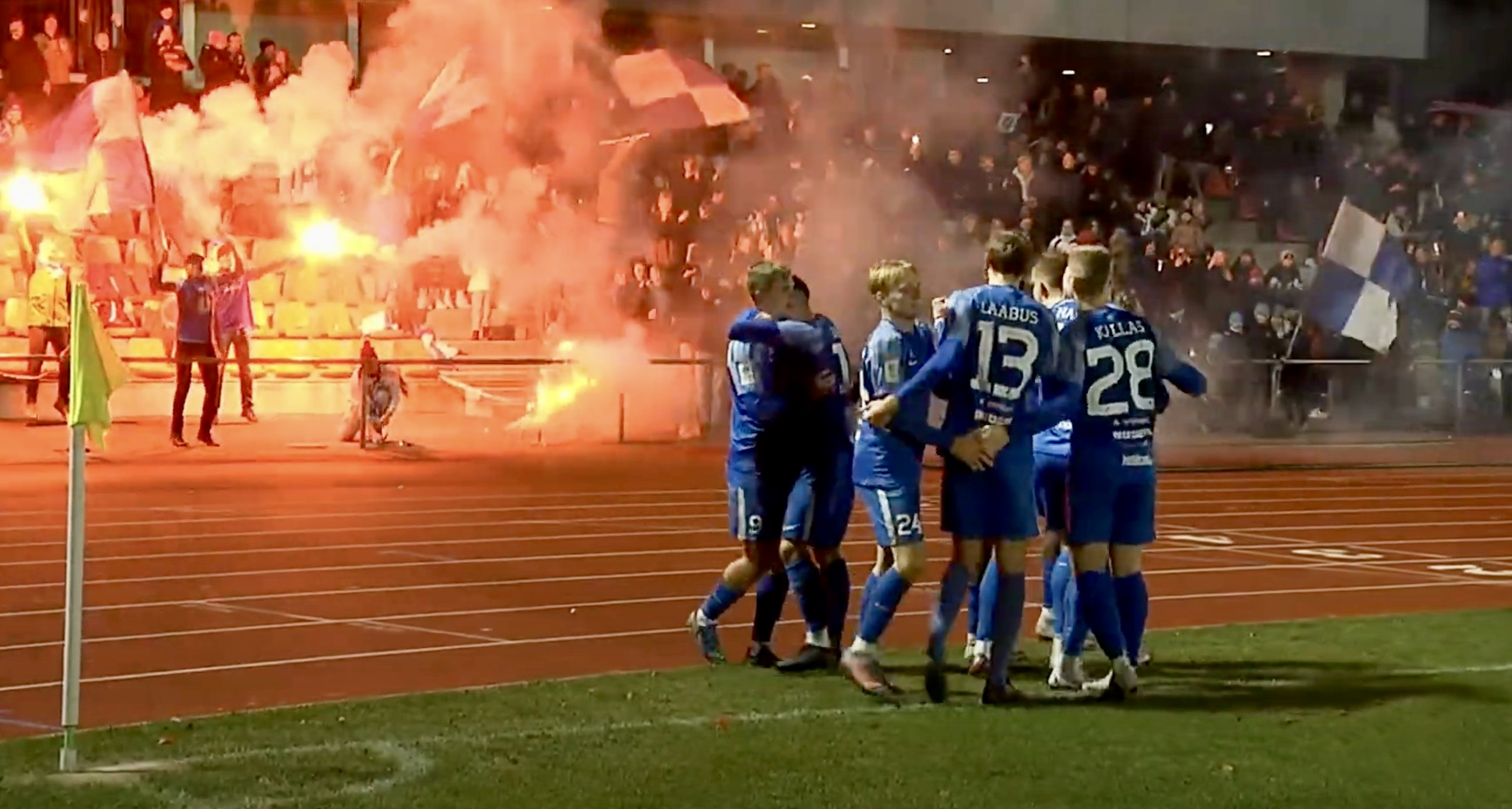
Tammeka celebrating a goal in front of their fans in 2023

In March 2017, Tammeka's CEO Kristjan Tiirik announced in an interview with ERR that the club had developed a strategic plan which would see them play for medals and European spots by 2020. Tammeka reached the 2016–17 Estonian Cup final, but were defeated 0–2 by FCI Tallinn. Under head coach Kaido Koppel, who went on to manage the team for nearly five seasons, Tammeka gradually improved their league performance, progressing from seventh place to consecutive fifth-place finishes in 2019 and 2020. However, the club failed to meet its ambitions set in 2017 and in the following half a decade, Tammeka alternated between lower mid-table finishes and relegation battles.

In August 2025, former Tammeka captain Kaarel Kiidron was elected as the club's president, and Tammeka appointed Karel Voolaid as head coach for the 2026 season.

== Kit ==
=== Colours ===
The colours of Tammeka - blue and white - are derived from the colours of the Estonian flag and were established during the club's founding in 1989 as a direct statement of support for the Estonian independence movement.

=== Kit manufacturers and shirt sponsors ===
Period	Kit manufacturer	Shirt sponsor	Ref
2014–2015	Nike	Goldtime	
2016	Nike	Sportland	
2017–2021	Nike	Metec	
2022–2025	Nike	–	
2025–	Nike	Livida	

== Stadium ==
=== Tamme Stadium ===
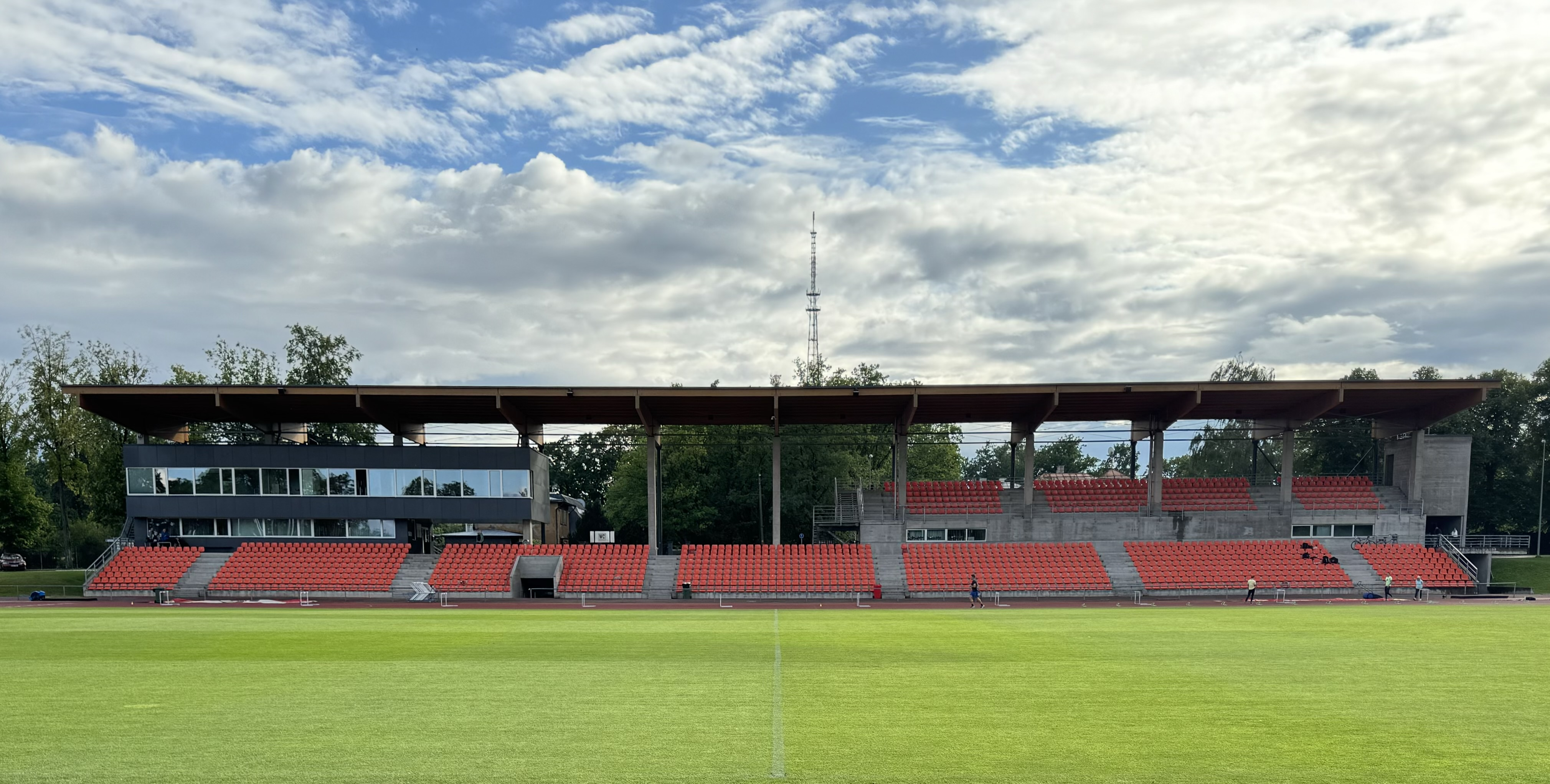
The main stand of the Tartu Tamme Stadium

The club's home ground is the 1,750-seat Tartu Tamme Stadium. First opened in 1932, it is the largest football stadium in Tartu. The stadium was renovated and re-opened in 2011. Tartu Tamme Stadium is located at Tamme 1, Tammelinn, Tartu.

=== Sepa Jalgpallikeskus ===
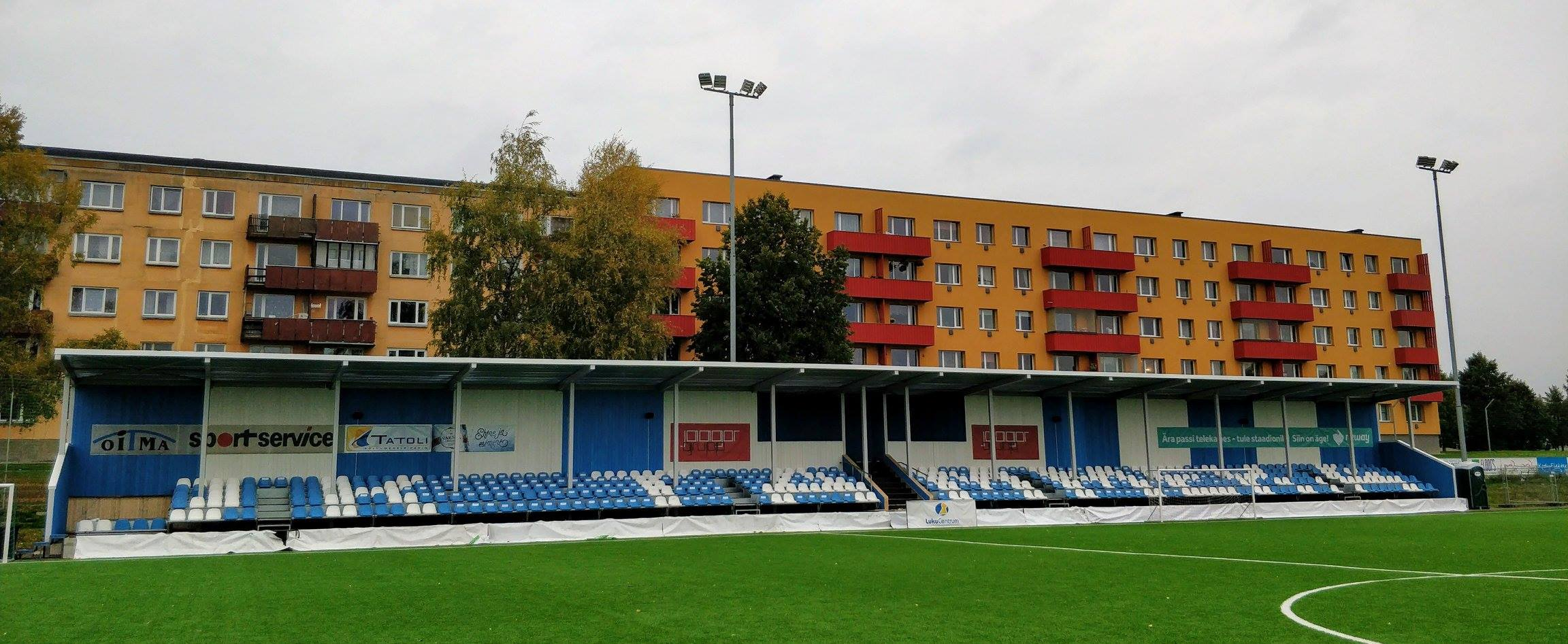
Sepa Jalgpallikeskus is the training centre of Tartu Tammeka

Tammeka's training centre is Sepa Jalgpallikeskus, located in the Ropka industrial district. Opened in 2016, the football centre has a natural grass training field and a 504-seat artificial turf ground with under-soil heating, of which the latter is used by the first team as a home ground during winter and early spring months.

In April 2022, an indoor football facility named Annemõisa Jalgpallihall was opened in Tartu. Costing over 3 million euros, the complex facilitates footballers during the snowy winter and spring months.

== Players ==
=== First-team squad ===
As of 21 August 2026.

Note: Flags indicate national team as defined under FIFA eligibility rules; some limited exceptions apply. Players may hold more than one non-FIFA nationality.

No.	Pos.	Nation	Player
3	DF	BRA	Pedro Manoel
4	DF	EST	Mait Vaino
5	DF	EST	Marius Vister
7	MF	BRA	Thomas Lisboa
8	MF	EST	Karl Kiidron
9	FW	SEN	Moussa Félix Sambe (on loan from FCI Levadia)
10	MF	ITA	Giacomo Uggeri
11	MF	EST	Robin Mathias Müür
12	GK	EST	Kristofer Sahtel
13	MF	EST	Reio Laabus
17	MF	FRA	Joachim Amijekori
19	FW	EST	Tristan Koskor
22	MF	EST	Tanel Lang
23	MF	EST	Patrick Genro Veelma

No.	Pos.	Nation	Player
24	MF	EST	Herman Pedmanson
25	MF	EST	Arti Viinapuu
26	GK	EST	Kristen Lapa (on loan from Flora)
27	DF	EST	Laurits Õunpuu
28	DF	EST	Rasmus Kallas
29	FW	EST	Romet Silov
44	DF	FIN	Oliver Kangaslahti (captain)
70	FW	SLE	Osman Koroma
72	DF	EST	German Jürgenthal
77	GK	EST	Carl Kiidjärv
79	MF	EST	Pavel Marin
89	FW	BRA	Kauan Pereira
94	GK	EST	Richard Aland
99	MF	GAM	Muhammed Hydara (on loan from Jelgava)

=== Out on loan ===
Note: Flags indicate national team as defined under FIFA eligibility rules; some limited exceptions apply. Players may hold more than one non-FIFA nationality.

No. / Pos. / Nation / Player; 18 / DF / EST / Mihkel Sepp (at Welco until 31 December 2026)	No. / Pos. / Nation / Player; — / MF / EST / Kevin Burov (at Elva until 31 December 2026)

== Club officials ==
=== Coaching staff ===
Position	Name
Head coach	(Estonia) Karel Voolaid
Assistant coaches	(Estonia) Karl Gustav Kärner
Assistant coaches	(Ukraine) Bogdan Lukashenko
Goalkeeping coach	(Estonia) Mait Toom
Fitness coach	(Estonia) Alar Trumm
Physiotherapist	(Estonia) Margus Parts
Masseur	(Estonia) Vladimir Heerik
Management
President	(Estonia) Kaarel Kiidron
Chief Executive Officer	(Estonia) Kristjan Tiirik
Board member	(Estonia) Veiko Soo
Technical Director	(Estonia) Ken Viidebaum
Head of Youth	(Estonia) Siim Valtna

=== Managerial history ===
Dates	Name
1989–2000	(Estonia) Hillar Otto
2001	(Estonia) Avo Jakovits
2001	(Finland) Jyri Kangasniemi
2002	(Estonia) Ants Kommusaar
2003	(Estonia) Hillar Otto
2003–2005	(Estonia) Meelis Eelmäe
2005–2007	(Estonia) Sergei Ratnikov
2007–2008	(Estonia) Sergei Zamogilnõi
2008–2009	(Estonia) Norbert Hurt
2009–2011	(Estonia) Marko Kristal
2011–2012	(Estonia) Kristjan Tiirik
2012	(Greece) Joti Stamatopoulos
2013	(Germany) Uwe Erkenbrecher
2014–2016	(Estonia) Indrek Koser
2017; 2017–2021	(Estonia) Mario Hansi (Estonia) Kaido Koppel
2021	(Latvia) Dmitrijs Kalašņikovs
2022	(Portugal) Miguel Santos
2022–2025	(Estonia) Marti Pähn
2025	(Estonia) Siim Valtna
2026–	(Estonia) Karel Voolaid

== Honours ==
=== League ===
- Esiliiga
  - Winners (1): 2004

=== Cup ===
- Estonian Cup
  - Runners-up (2): 2007–08, 2016–17

== Seasons and statistics ==
=== Seasons ===
Season	Division	Pos	Pld	W	D	L	GF	GA	GD	Pts	Top goalscorer	Cup
2000	III liiga (S)	1	20	15	1	4	75	24	+51	46	(Estonia) Vitali Gussev (22)	
2001	II liiga (S/W)	1	20	15	0	5	72	29	+43	45	(Estonia) Kristjan Tiirik (20)	
2002	Esiliiga	6	28	9	6	13	47	66	−19	33	(Estonia) Kristjan Tiirik (11)	
2003	Esiliiga	7	28	3	5	20	44	99	−55	14	(Estonia) Kristjan Tiirik (20)	
2004	Esiliiga	1	28	17	7	4	74	34	+40	58	(Estonia) Oliver Konsa (25)	Second round
2005	Meistriliiga	7	36	8	5	23	50	88	−38	29	(Estonia) Kristjan Tiirik (15)	
2006	Meistriliiga	6	36	12	7	17	45	57	−12	43	(Estonia) Oliver Konsa (12)	
2007	Meistriliiga	5	36	18	8	10	54	40	+14	62	(Estonia) Siksten Kasimir (Estonia) Nikolai Lõsanov (10)	Quarter-finals
2008	Meistriliiga	7	36	9	4	23	45	76	−31	31	(Estonia) Kristjan Tiirik (11)	Runners-up
2009	Meistriliiga	7	36	7	3	26	29	86	−57	24	(Estonia) Albert Prosa (6)	Quarter-finals
2010	Meistriliiga	6	36	11	7	18	50	66	−16	40	(Estonia) Albert Prosa (12)	Semi-finals
2011	Meistriliiga	7	36	11	6	19	57	75	−18	39	(Estonia) Albert Prosa (22)	Fourth round
2012	Meistriliiga	10	36	4	8	24	30	79	−49	20	(Estonia) Kaspar Kaldoja (5)	Quarter-finals
2013	Meistriliiga	9	36	8	8	20	30	68	−38	32	(Estonia) Kristjan Tiirik (6)	Semi-finals
2014	Meistriliiga	7	36	7	7	22	37	83	−46	28	(Estonia) Kristjan Tiirik (13)	Third round
2015	Meistriliiga	9	36	7	4	25	39	96	−57	25	(Estonia) Kristjan Tiirik (10)	Third round
2016	Meistriliiga	7	36	12	5	19	43	65	−22	41	(Estonia) Kristjan Tiirik (12)	Semi-finals
2017	Meistriliiga	7	36	9	10	17	40	63	−23	37	(Estonia) Tristan Koskor (10)	Runners-up
2018	Meistriliiga	6	36	14	7	15	56	58	−2	49	(Estonia) Tristan Koskor (21)	Second round
2019	Meistriliiga	5	36	14	7	15	57	62	−5	49	(Estonia) Sten Reinkort (11)	Quarter-finals
2020	Meistriliiga	5	28	8	8	12	33	44	−11	32	(Estonia) Tristan Koskor (12)	Quarter-finals
2021	Meistriliiga	9	30	7	4	19	34	72	−38	25	(Estonia) Tristan Koskor (11)	Quarter-finals
2022	Meistriliiga	6	36	10	9	17	38	57	−19	39	(Estonia) Kevin Mätas (10)	Quarter-finals
2023	Meistriliiga	9	36	5	12	19	33	65	−32	27	(Estonia) Kevin Mätas (10)	Semi-finals
2024	Meistriliiga	5	36	11	9	16	47	54	−7	42	(Nigeria) Ahmed Adebayo (15)	Fourth round
2025	Meistriliiga	8	36	9	3	24	47	83	−36	30	(Nigeria) Ahmed Adebayo (11)	Third round
