= 2026 in Estonian football =

Football in Estonia
- Season: 2026

Men's football
- Meistriliiga: Tallinna FCI Levadia
- Esiliiga: Tartu JK Welco
- Esiliiga B: JK Narva Trans U21
- Beach football: SK Augur Enemat/Coolbet
- Futsal: Tallinna FC Bunker Partner
- Tipneri karikas: Tallinna FC Flora
- Supercup: Nõmme Kalju FC

Women's football
- Meistriliiga: Paide Linnanaiskond
- Esiliiga: Pärnu JK Poseidon
- Futsal: Tallinna Aurora Futsal
- Estonian Cup: Saku Sporting
- Supercup: Saku Sporting

This page summarizes everything related to Estonian football in the year 2026. It contains information about different league systems, national teams, futsal, beach football and most important transfers.

== National teams ==
The 2026 season for the Estonia national football team is centered on international friendlies and the commencement of the 2026–27 UEFA Nations League in September. Following the conclusion of the 2026 World Cup qualification cycle in late 2025, the team enters a transition phase under head coach Jürgen Henn. The women's national team begins its 2027 FIFA Women's World Cup qualification campaign in March, while the youth setups continue their development in UEFA European Championship qualifying rounds.

=== Men's national ===
Senior

27 March 2026 FIFA Series – SF	Kenya	1–1 (4–5 p)	Estonia	Kigali, Rwanda
18:00 (UTC+3)	Ogam 51'	Report	21' Tammik	Stadium: Amahoro Stadium; Referee: Georges Gatogato (Burundi)
	Penalties
	A. Odhiambo (penalty scored); Bajaber (penalty missed); Ouma (penalty scored); Erambo (penalty scored); Omondi (penalty scored); Odada (penalty missed)		(penalty scored) Tõugjas; (penalty missed) Yakovlev; (penalty scored) Schjønning-Larsen; (penalty scored) Tamm; (penalty scored) Sappinen; (penalty scored) Soomets

30 March 2026 FIFA Series – F	Rwanda	2–0	Estonia	Kigali, Rwanda
20:30 (UTC+3)	Biramahire 30'; L. Mickels 51'	Report		Stadium: Amahoro Stadium; Referee: Ahmed Hassan Hussein (Somalia)

6 June 2026 Baltic Cup – SF	Estonia	1–0	Faroe Islands	Pärnu, Estonia
18:00 (UTC+3)	Varjund 66'	Report		Stadium: Pärnu Rannastaadion; Attendance: 1,543; Referee: Kristaps Ratnieks (Latvia)

9 June 2026 Baltic Cup – F	Estonia	1–0	Lithuania	Tallinn, Estonia
19:00 (UTC+3)	Mustmaa 80'	Report		Stadium: Lilleküla Stadium; Attendance: 3,613; Referee: Vitālijs Spasjonņikovs (Latvia)

26 September 2026–27 NL GS	Iceland	1–1	Estonia	Reykjavík, Iceland
19:00 (UTC+3)	Guðjohnsen 45'	Report	64' Paskotši	Stadium: Laugardalsvöllur; Attendance: 5,320; Referee: Miloš Milanović (Serbia)

29 September 2026–27 NL GS	Bulgaria	0–0	Estonia	Plovdiv, Bulgaria
21:45 (UTC+3)		Report		Stadium: Hristo Botev Stadium; Attendance: 960; Referee: Goga Kikacheishvili (Georgia)

3 October 2026–27 NL GS	Estonia	1–0	Luxembourg	Tallinn, Estonia
19:00 (UTC+3)	Peetson 5'	Report		Stadium: Lilleküla Stadium; Attendance: 7,211; Referee: Paweł Raczkowski (Poland)

6 October 2026–27 NL GS	Estonia	0–0	Iceland	Tallinn, Estonia
21:45 (UTC+3)		Report		Stadium: Lilleküla Stadium; Attendance: 5,987; Referee: David Dickinson (Scotland)

13 November 2026–27 NL GS	Luxembourg	0–1	Estonia	Luxembourg City, Luxembourg
21:45 (UTC+3)		Report	42' Paskotši	Stadium: Stade de Luxembourg; Attendance: 9,214; Referee: Ishmael Barbara (Malta)

15 November 2026–27 NL GS	Estonia	2−1	Bulgaria	Tallinn, Estonia
19:00 (UTC+3)	Kristal 8'; Palumets 60'	Report	45+1' Kovachev	Stadium: Lilleküla Stadium; Attendance: 8,006; Referee: Nenad Minaković (Serbia)

U21

26 March 2027 EC Q – 1R	Iceland	6−2	Estonia	Reykjavík, Iceland
19:00 (UTC+3)	Guðjohnsen 2', 56'; Daðason 45+2', 51'; Mikaelsson 73'; Ingason 79'	Report	35' Kriis; 90+2' Sillamaa	Stadium: Valbjarnarvöllur; Attendance: 250; Referee: Marius Hansen Grøtta (Norway)

31 March 2027 EC Q – 1R	Switzerland	2−1	Estonia	Thun, Austria
21:00 (UTC+3)	Boteli 8'; Tsawa 65'	Report	36' Orlov	Stadium: Stockhorn Arena; Attendance: 1,212; Referee: Rob Harvey (Ireland)

5 June 2026 Baltic Cup	Latvia	1–1	Estonia	Riga, Latvia
18:00 (UTC+3)	Anisjko 3'	Report	33' Orlov	Stadium: LNK Sporta Parks; Attendance: 151; Referee: Vasīlijs Mordatenko

7 June 2026 Baltic Cup	Estonia	2–2	Lithuania	Riga, Latvia
18:00 (UTC+3)	Mustmaa 12', 15'	Report	33' Praleika; 83' Usavičius	Stadium: Daugavgrivas vidusskolas stadions Referee: Deniss Kozlovs

25 September 2027 EC Q – 1R	Estonia	1–2	Faroe Islands	Pärnu, Estonia
19:00 (UTC+3)	Pajo 80' (pen.)	Report	54', 66' Benjaminsen	Stadium: Pärnu Rannastaadion; Attendance: 321; Referee: Kristaps Ratnieks (Latvia)

29 September 2027 EC Q – 1R	Estonia	0–2	France	Pärnu, Estonia
19:00 (UTC+3)		Report	24' Ngoura; 68' Bahoya	Stadium: Pärnu Rannastaadion; Attendance: 1,220; Referee: Pavle Ilić (Serbia)

6 October 2027 EC Q – 1R	Luxembourg	3–0	Estonia	Esch-sur-Alzette, Luxembourg
20:00 (UTC+3)	Tavares 30'; Thelen 90'; Englaro 90+3'	Report		Stadium: Stade de la Frontière; Attendance: 280; Referee: Giorgi Avazashvili (Georgia)

U19
U17 (2009)

25 May 2027 EC – GS	Estonia	1−4	Spain	Tallinn, Estonia
14:30 (UTC+3)	Boteli 8'; Tsawa 65'	Report	16' Urrestarazu; 30' Mayans; 35' Alves; 49' (pen.) Tunkara	Stadium: Lilleküla Stadium; Attendance: 4,724; Referee: Asker Nadjafaliev (Uzbekistan)

25 May 2027 EC – GS	Estonia	1–3	Croatia	Tallinn, Estonia
19:00 (UTC+3)	Visse 90'	Report	2', 35' Žužić Škafar; 55' (pen.) Benkotić	Stadium: Lilleküla Stadium; Attendance: 3,004; Referee: Oğuzhan Çakır (Turkey)

25 May 2027 EC – GS	Belgium	1–0	Estonia	Tallinn, Estonia
14:30 (UTC+3)	Kalonji 41'	Report		Stadium: Lilleküla Stadium; Attendance: 2,258; Referee: Tom Owen (Wales)

U17 (2010)
U16

24 October 2026 WC & Festival – GS	Estonia	1–0	Kosovo	Baku, Azerbaijan
08:00 (UTC+3)		Report		Stadium: Hovsan Competition Complex

25 October 2026 WC & Festival – GS	Anguilla	0–7	Estonia	Baku, Azerbaijan
10:45 (UTC+3)		Report		Stadium: Hovsan Competition Complex

25 October 2026 WC & Festival – GS	France	2–2	Estonia	Baku, Azerbaijan
17:30 (UTC+3)		Report		Stadium: Hovsan Competition Complex

26 October 2026 WC & Festival – GS	Estonia	0–0	South Africa	Baku, Azerbaijan
09:30 (UTC+3)		Report		Stadium: Hovsan Competition Complex

26 October 2026 WC & Festival – GS	Estonia	3–1	Maldives	Baku, Azerbaijan
16:15 (UTC+3)		Report		Stadium: Hovsan Competition Complex

28 October 2026 WC & Festival – R32	Uruguay	6–0	Estonia	Baku, Azerbaijan
12:30 (UTC+3)		Report		Stadium: Hovsan Competition Complex

28 October 2026 WC & Festival – R16	Australia	2–1	Estonia	Baku, Azerbaijan
18:45 (UTC+3)		Report		Stadium: Hovsan Competition Complex

29 October 2026 WC & Festival – QF	Estonia	1–2	Algeria	Baku, Azerbaijan
09:30 (UTC+3)		Report		Stadium: Hovsan Competition Complex

29 October 2026 WC & Festival – SF	Bulgaria	2–0	Estonia	Baku, Azerbaijan
16:15 (UTC+3)		Report		Stadium: Hovsan Competition Complex

30 October 2026 WC & Festival – F	Angola	3–2	Estonia	Baku, Azerbaijan
07:00 (UTC+3)		Report		Stadium: Hovsan Competition Complex

U15

=== Women's national ===
Senior

3 March 2027 WC Q — L.C	Bosnia and Herzegovina	3–1	Estonia	Zenica, Bosnia
13:00 (UTC+3)	Milinković 36'; Šabanagić 45+3'; Grebenar 88'	Report	41' (pen.) Räämet	Stadium: FF BH Football Training Centre; Attendance: 100; Referee: Karoline Marie Jensen (Norway)

7 March 2027 WC Q — L.C	Lithuania	0–0	Estonia	Raudondvaris, Lithuania
16:00 (UTC+3)		Report		Stadium: Raudondvario stadionas Attendance: 587; Referee: Marina Živković (Serbia)

10 April Friendly	Czech Republic U23	4–0	Estonia	Prague, Czech Republic
13:30 (UTC+3)	Jelinkova 3'; Tenkratova 8'; Hlavacova 33'; Hola 87'	Report		Stadium: Atletický stadion SC Radotín; Attendance: 41; Referee: Monika Hausnerová

14 April 2027 WC Q — L.C	Estonia	2–1	Liechtenstein	Tallinn, Estonia
18:00 (UTC+3)	Kubassova 44' (pen.); Kirpu 84'	Report	50' Steck	Stadium: Lilleküla Stadium; Attendance: 502; Referee: Rita Vehapi (Kosovo)

18 April 2027 WC Q — L.C	Estonia	2–1	Lithuania	Tallinn, Estonia
17:00 (UTC+3)	Lillemäe 42'; Tammik 90+3'	Report	30' Švarcaitė	Stadium: Lilleküla Stadium; Attendance: 487; Referee: Asen Albayrak (Turkey)

5 June 2027 WC Q — L.C	Liechtenstein	0–5	Estonia	Vaduz, Liechtenstein
20:00 (UTC+3)		Report	6' Kubassova; 29' Kirpu; 50' Tammik; 60' Merisalu; 83' Teern	Stadium: Rheinpark Stadion; Attendance: 695; Referee: Araksya Saribekyan (Armenia)

9 June 2027 WC Q — L.C	Estonia	1–1	Bosnia and Herzegovina	Pärnu, Estonia
20:00 (UTC+3)	Kubassova 10'	Report	23' Hasanbegović	Stadium: Pärnu Rannastaadion; Referee: Michaela Pachtová (Czech Republic)

9 October Friendly	Estonia	2–1	Czech Republic U23	Tallinn, Estonia
19:00 (UTC+3)	Kirpu 1'; Tammik 44'	Report	89' Obadalova	Stadium: Lilleküla Stadium; Attendance: Gabriela Kaskmaa (Estonia); Referee: 205

13 October Friendly	Finland U23	9–0	Estonia	Järvenpää, Finland
14:00 (UTC+3)	Forsblom 2', 16', 30', 31', 48', 90+1'; Jahnukainen 6'; Pitko 82'; Hassinen 87'	Report		Stadium: Järvenpää stadium Attendance: 78; Referee: Jasmine Kaur

28 November 2026 Baltic Cup - SF	Faroe Islands	v	Estonia	Paide, Estonia
19:00 (UTC+3)				Stadium: Paide indoor hall

1 December 2026 Baltic Cup - TBD	Estonia	v	TBD	Paide, Estonia
18:00 (UTC+3)				Stadium: Paide indoor hall

U19
U17
U15

== League system ==
The 2026 domestic season is scheduled to run from March 6 to November, with the Premium Liiga featuring ten clubs competing for the national title. This year marks the return of Nõmme United to the top flight. The Esiliiga and Esiliiga B provide the professional pathway for the pyramid, while the lower regional tiers continue to host matches across the country throughout the summer months.

=== Men's leagues ===
==== A. Le Coq Premium liiga ====
Pos	Team	Pld	W	D	L	GF	GA	GD	Pts	Qualification or relegation
1	Tallinna FCI Levadia (C)	36	28	7	1	97	29	+68	91	Champions League first qualifying round
2	Paide Linnameeskond	36	19	7	10	56	43	+13	64	Conference League first qualifying round (Note: The 2026–27 Estonian Cup winners also qualify for the Conference League first qualifying round (or the fourth-placed team of the Meistriliiga if the Estonian Cup winners finish in the top three).)
3	Tallinna FC Flora	36	20	2	14	68	51	+17	62	Conference League first qualifying round
4	Nõmme Kalju FC	36	18	7	11	61	36	+25	61	
5	Tartu JK Tammeka	36	17	2	17	50	60	−10	53	
6	Harju JK Laagri	36	15	2	19	51	55	−4	47	
7	Pärnu JK Vaprus	36	11	7	18	51	69	−18	40	
8	FC Nõmme United	36	12	2	22	59	81	−22	38	
9	FC Kuressaare (Q)	36	10	7	19	36	55	−19	37	Qualification for the Meistriliiga play-off
10	JK Narva Trans (R)	36	6	5	25	29	79	−50	23	Relegation to the Esiliiga

Source: EJL
Rules for classification: 1) Points; 2) Less matches awarded against; 3) Head-to-head points; 4) Head-to-head goal difference; 5) Matches won; 6) Goal difference; 7) Goals scored; 8) Away goals scored; 9) Fair-play points; 10) Draw
(C) Champions; (Q) Qualified for the phase indicated; (R) Relegated
Notes:
Locations of the 2026 Meistriliiga teams

Relegation play-off's:

Team 1	Agg.	Team 2	1st leg	2nd leg
FC Kuressaare (ML 9th)		Viimsi JK (EL 2nd)		

==== Esiliiga & Esiliiga B ====
Esiliiga

Locations of the 2026 Esiliiga teams

The 2026 season had three team changes compared with the previous year. The 2025 Esiliiga champions FC Nõmme United were promoted to Premium Liiga after one season in the second division and were replaced by relegated JK Tallinna Kalev, who returned after four seasons in the top flight. JK Tallinna Kalev U21 and Tartu JK Tammeka U21 were relegated to Esiliiga B and replaced by Maardu Linnameeskond, who won Esiliiga B for the second time, and FC Nõmme United U21, who made their Esiliiga debut.

The season was marked by several unusual incidents. In September, a referee's error during a match between Nõmme United U21 and FC Elva led to the final minutes being replayed from the 88th minute, with Elva having only eight players on the field after two earlier dismissals. Later that month, the Estonian Football Association launched disciplinary proceedings over suspected betting and match-fixing involving Maardu Linnameeskond, with head coach Deniss Kovtun and players Vladislav Tšurilkin and Artjom Volkov placed under temporary bans from football. On 5 October, Maardu withdrew from the remainder of the season and lost its licence to compete in the licensed divisions. Its previous results remained valid, while its remaining fixtures were awarded as forfeits to its opponents.

Pos	Team	Pld	W	D	L	GF	GA	GD	Pts	Promotion, qualification or relegation
1	Tartu JK Welco (C, P)	36	25	5	6	101	45	+56	80	Meistriliiga
2	Viimsi JK (Q)	36	19	6	11	72	35	+37	63	Play-off for Meistriliiga
3	Tallinna FCI Levadia U21 (Note: Reserve teams are ineligible for promotion (parent team is playing one division higher).)	36	19	3	14	71	59	+12	60	
4	FC Elva	36	16	9	11	52	52	0	57	
5	Tallinna FC Flora U21	36	16	7	13	78	62	+16	55	
6	JK Tallinna Kalev	36	12	8	16	59	64	−5	44	
7	FC Nõmme United U21	36	12	6	18	59	73	−14	42	
8	FC Tallinn (Q)	36	11	8	17	45	77	−32	41	Play-off for Esiliiga B
9	Nõmme Kalju FC U21 (R)	36	7	5	24	39	95	−56	26	Esiliiga B
10	Maardu Linnameeskond (D, R)	36	12	5	19	45	59	−14	41	Disqualified

Source: EJL
Rules for classification: 1) Points; 2) Less matches awarded against; 3) Head-to-head points; 4) Head-to-head goal difference; 5) Matches won; 6) Goal difference; 7) Goals scored; 8) Away goals scored; 9) Fairplay ranking.
(C) Champions; (D) Disqualified; (P) Promoted; (Q) Qualified for the phase indicated; (R) Relegated
Notes:

Relegation play-off's:

Team 1	Agg.	Team 2	1st leg	2nd leg
FC Tallinn (EL 8th)		Viljandi JK Tulevik (ELB 5th)		

Esiliiga B

Locations of the 2026 Esiliiga B teams

The 2026 season featured several changes in the league's lineup. Tallinna Kalev U21 and Tartu Tammeka U21 were relegated from Esiliiga, replacing Maardu Linnameeskond and Nõmme United U21, who were promoted to the second division. Two teams were promoted from II liiga for the first time: Pärnu JK Vaprus U21 and Tallinna FCI Levadia U19. Viljandi Tulevik also gained promotion after defeating Paide Linnameeskond U21 in the promotion play-offs, condemning Paide to a second consecutive relegation. Kuressaare U21, after three seasons in Esiliiga B, and Läänemaa JK, who had competed in the division since 2020, were relegated to II liiga.

In March, former Estonia captain Ragnar Klavan returned to official league football, playing for Tallinna Kalev U21 against Viljandi Tulevik and assisting his team's goal in a 2–1 defeat. Due to the renovation of Kadriorg Stadium and insufficient facilities at Kalev Keskstaadion, the club's reserve team split its home matches between Raja indoor hall and Jüri Stadium. In August, a match between Tallinna JK Legion and Tartu Tammeka U21 was abandoned in the 68th minute with the score at 3–3 after Legion left the field in protest against the refereeing. The Estonian Football Association subsequently awarded Tammeka U21 a 3–0 victory, suspended Legion coach Mihhail Artjuhhov for five matches and fined the club €2,000.

Pos	Team	Pld	W	D	L	GF	GA	GD	Pts	Promotion, qualification or relegation
1	JK Narva Trans U21 (Note: Reserve teams are ineligible for promotion (parent team is playing one division higher).) (C)	36	24	4	8	80	41	+39	76	Reserve teams are ineligible for promotion
2	Tallinna FCI Levadia U19	36	22	3	11	88	60	+28	69	Reserve teams are ineligible for promotion
3	Tartu JK Tammeka U21 (P)	36	20	4	12	97	67	+30	64	Esiliiga
4	Jõhvi FC Phoenix (P)	36	20	3	13	86	78	+8	63	Esiliiga
5	Viljandi JK Tulevik (Q)	36	17	5	14	90	76	+14	56	Play-off for Esiliiga
6	Pärnu JK Vaprus U21	36	16	5	15	105	74	+31	53	
7	FA Tartu Kalev	36	16	2	18	80	71	+9	50	
8	JK Tabasalu	36	11	5	20	50	89	−39	38	
9	JK Tallinna Kalev U21 (Q)	36	9	6	21	70	90	−20	33	Play-off for II liiga
10	Tallinna JK Legion (R)	36	5	3	28	33	133	−100	18	II liiga

Source: EJL
Rules for classification: 1) Points; 2) Less matches awarded against; 3) Head-to-head points; 4) Head-to-head goal difference; 5) Matches won; 6) Goal difference; 7) Goals scored; 8) Away goals scored; 9) Fairplay ranking.
(C) Champions; (P) Promoted; (Q) Qualified for the phase indicated; (R) Relegated
Notes:

Relegation play-off's:

Team 1	Agg.	Team 2	1st leg	2nd leg
JK Tallinna Kalev U21 (ELB 9th)		Viimsi JK U21 (II 4th)		

==== Men's lower leagues ====
II liiga

Locations of the 2026 II liiga teams

Pos	Team	Pld	W	D	L	GF	GA	GD	Pts	Promotion, qualification or relegation
1	Harju JK Laagri U21 (C, P)	30	24	2	4	132	43	+89	74	Esiliiga B
2	FC Hiiumaa (P)	30	20	5	5	83	36	+47	65	Esiliiga B
3	Tallinna FC Placet	30	20	4	6	80	39	+41	64	
4	Viimsi JK U21 (Q)	30	19	1	10	84	44	+40	58	Play-off for Esiliiga B
5	Rakvere JK Tarvas	30	17	5	8	69	46	+23	56	
6	Paide Linnameeskond U21	30	17	2	11	65	52	+13	53	
7	Tallinna FC Flora U19	30	16	4	10	104	72	+32	52	
8	Tabasalu Ulasabat C.F.	30	15	5	10	64	48	+16	50	
9	Tartu JK Welco II (Note: Reserve teams named using "II" are ineligible for promotion.)	30	13	3	14	69	72	−3	42	
10	FC Tallinn U21	30	12	5	13	58	51	+7	41	
11	Saue JK	30	8	6	16	48	72	−24	30	
12	FC Kuressaare U21	30	8	5	17	53	87	−34	29	
13	FA Tartu Kalev U21 (Note: Reserve teams are ineligible for promotion (parent team is playing one division higher).)	30	7	3	20	61	97	−36	24	
14	Tartu FC Helios (Q)	30	5	3	22	45	100	−55	18	Play-off for II liiga B
15	Keila JK (R)	30	5	3	22	43	109	−66	18	II liiga B
16	Läänemaa JK (R)	30	5	2	23	30	120	−90	17	II liiga B

Source: EJL
Rules for classification: 1) Points; 2) Less matches awarded against; 3) Head-to-head points; 4) Head-to-head goal difference; 5) Matches won; 6) Goal difference; 7) Goals scored; 8) Away goals scored; 9) Fairplay ranking.
(C) Champions; (P) Promoted; (Q) Qualified for the phase indicated; (R) Relegated
Notes:

Relegation play-off's:

Team 1	Agg.	Team 2	1st leg	2nd leg
Tallinna FC Tamper (II.B N/W 4th)	4–1	Tallinna FC Starmedia (II.B S/E 3rd)	1–1	3–0
Tartu FC Helios (II 14th)		Tallinna FC Tamper (SF winner)	2–8	

II liiga B

Locations of the 2026 II liiga B teams

North/West
Pos	Team	Pld	Pts
1	Põhja-Tallinna JK Volta (C)	24	65
2	Tallinna FC Zapoos	24	57
3	Kristiine JK	24	50
4	Tallinna FC Tamper (Q)	24	49
5	Saku Sporting	24	47
6	Vändra JK Vaprus	24	33
7	Pärnu JK Poseidon	24	31
8	JK Tabasalu U21	24	24
9	Rummu Dünamo	24	23
10	Lasnamäe FC Ajax	24	21
11	Nõmme Kalju FC III	24	21
12	Pärnu JK Vaprus U19	24	17
13	Tallinna FC Zealot Sporting (R)	24	15
14	Tallinna JK Piraaja (D, R)	0	0

Source: EJL
(C) Champions; (D) Disqualified; (Q) Qualified for the phase indicated; (R) Relegated

South/East
Pos	Team	Pld	Pts
1	Rae Spordikool (C, P)	26	64
2	Paide Linnameeskond III	26	64
3	Tallinna FC Starmedia (Q)	26	58
4	JK Tallinna Kalev III	26	54
5	Jõgeva SK Noorus-96	26	48
6	Võru FC Helios	26	40
7	FC Kose	26	38
8	FC Elva U21	26	31
9	Raasiku FC Joker	26	31
10	Ida-Viru JK Noova	26	30
11	Tallinna FC Flora U18	26	25
12	Põlva FC Lootos (R)	26	20
13	Viljandi JK Tulevik U21 (R)	26	13
14	JK Kuusalu Kalev (R)	26	8

Source: EJL
(C) Champions; (P) Promoted; (Q) Qualified for the phase indicated; (R) Relegated

Champion's match:

Team 1	Score	Team 2
Põhja-Tallinna JK Volta (II.B N/W 1st)	3–3 (PSO 3–1)	Rae Spordikool (II.B S/E 1st)

Relegation play-off's:

Team 1	Agg.	Team 2	1st leg	2nd leg
Põlva FC Lootos (II.B S/E 12th)	4–8	Tartu JK Tammeka U19 (III S/E 5th)	0–5	4–3
Pärnu JK Vaprus U19 (II.B N/W 12th)	10–2	Harju JK Laagri III (III N/W 3rd)	4–1	6–1

III liiga

North/West
Pos	Team	Pld	Pts
1	Rumori Calcio Tallinn (C, P)	22	56
2	FC Nõmme United U19	22	54
3	Harju JK Laagri III	22	39
4	Raplamaa JK	22	36
5	FC Pelgu City	22	36
6	Viimsi JK III	22	31
7	Tallinna FC Hell Hunt	22	30
8	Märjamaa Kompanii	22	29
9	Kohila Püsivus	22	25
10	Keila JK II	22	23
11	Tallinna FC EstHam United (R)	22	17
12	Viimsi Lõvid (D, R)	22	3

Source: EJL
(C) Champions; (D) Disqualified; (P) Promoted; (R) Relegated

North/East
Pos	Team	Pld	Pts
1	Tallinna Mustamäe Jalgpalliklubi (C, P)	18	38
2	Türi Ganvix JK	18	36
3	FC Eston Villa & Põhja-Tallinna JK Volta ÜM	18	35
4	FC Järva-Jaani	18	33
5	Maardu Aliens	18	33
6	FC Tallinna Wolves	18	30
7	Rakvere FC Freedom	18	17
8	Rae Spordikool II	18	16
9	JK Loo	18	11
10	Rakvere JK Tarvas II (D)	18	15

Source: EJL
(C) Champions; (D) Disqualified; (P) Promoted

South/East
Pos	Team	Pld	Pts
1	FC Elva III (C)	20	55
2	Tartu Team Helm (P)	20	53
3	Tartu JK Welco X	20	43
4	Tartu JK Merkuur-Juunior	20	39
5	Tartu JK Tammeka U19 (P)	20	38
6	FC Vastseliina	20	25
7	FC Otepää	20	22
8	Tartu FC Helios II	20	18
9	FC Jõgeva Wolves	20	15
10	Tõrva JK	20	9
11	Valga FC Warrior (R)	20	4

Source: EJL
(C) Champions; (P) Promoted; (R) Relegated

Champion's match:

Team 1	Score	Team 2
Rumori Calcio Tallinn (N/W 1st)	1–0	Tallinna Mustamäe Jalgpalliklubi (N/E 1st)
FC Elva III (S/E 1st)	1–1 (PSO 4–3)	Tartu Team Helm (S/E 2nd)
FC Elva III (SF winner)	2–0	Rumori Calcio Tallinn (SF winner)

IV liiga

North/East
Pos	Team	Pld	Pts
1	Raasiku FC Joker II (C, P)	21	49
2	Tallinna JK Jalgpallihaigla (P)	21	45
3	Saue JK II	21	39
4	JK Arsenal & Põhja-Tallinna JK Volta ÜM	21	38
5	Rumori Calcio II Tallinn	21	32
6	FC Raasiku Valla	21	22
7	Tallinna FC Wise	21	12
8	FC Toompea	21	6

Source: EJL
(C) Champions; (P) Promoted

North/West
Pos	Team	Pld	Pts
1	FC Gegenpress Tallinn (C, P)	18	48
2	Tallinna FC Olympic (P)	18	32
3	Tallinna FC Soccernet	18	24
4	Tallinna FC Reaal	18	22
5	FC Hiiumaa II	18	21
6	Aruküla FC Vigri	18	18
7	TalTech Jalgpalliklubi	18	11

Source: EJL
(C) Champions; (P) Promoted

Champion's match:

Team 1	Score	Team 2
FC Gegenpress Tallinn (IV N/W 1st)	3–0	Raasiku FC Joker II (IV N/E 1st)

=== Women's leagues ===
==== Naiste Meistriliiga ====
Pos	Team	Pld	W	D	L	GF	GA	GD	Pts	Promotion, qualification or relegation
1	Paide Linnanaiskond (C)	25	18	0	7	77	35	+42	54	Qualification for the Champions League first qualifying round
2	Tallinna FC Flora	25	16	3	6	78	31	+47	51	
3	Saku Sporting	25	14	2	9	68	52	+16	44	
4	Viimsi JK	25	12	4	9	54	47	+7	40	
5	Harju JK Laagri	25	5	3	17	39	74	−35	18	
6	FC Elva (Q)	25	3	2	20	33	110	−77	11	Play-off for Naiste Esiliiga

Source: EJL
Rules for classification: 1) Points; 2) Less matches awarded against; 3) Head-to-head points; 4) Head-to-head goal difference; 5) Matches won; 6) Goal difference; 7) Goals scored; 8) Away goals scored; 9) Fair-play ranking.
(C) Champions; (Q) Qualified for the phase indicated

==== Women's lower leagues ====
Naiste Esiliiga

Pos	Team	Pld	W	D	L	GF	GA	GD	Pts	Promotion, qualification or relegation
1	Pärnu JK Poseidon (C, P)	21	20	0	1	86	21	+65	60	Naiste Meistriliiga
2	Tallinna FC Flora II (Note: Reserve teams are ineligible for promotion (parent team is playing one division higher).)	21	16	0	5	86	30	+56	48	Reserve teams are ineligible for promotion
3	Harju JK Laagri II	21	14	0	7	72	51	+21	42	Reserve teams are ineligible for promotion
4	Põlva FC Lootos (P)	21	10	3	8	45	41	+4	33	Naiste Meistriliiga
5	Tartu JK Tammeka (Q)	21	8	4	9	42	43	−1	28	Play-off for Naiste Meistriliiga
6	Lasnamäe FC Ajax	21	5	3	13	21	68	−47	18	
7	Tartu NJK Electra (R)	21	2	3	16	19	74	−55	9	Play-off for Naiste Teine liiga
8	Tallinna FC Levadia (R)	21	2	1	18	24	67	−43	7	Naiste Teine liiga

Source: EJL
Rules for classification: 1) Points; 2) Less matches awarded against; 3) Head-to-head points; 4) Head-to-head goal difference; 5) Matches won; 6) Goal difference; 7) Goals scored; 8) Away goals scored; 9) Fair-play ranking.
(C) Champions; (P) Promoted; (Q) Qualified for the phase indicated; (R) Relegated
Notes:

Relegation play-off's:

Team 1	Agg.	Team 2	1st leg	2nd leg
Tartu NJK Electra (N.EL 7th)	1–4	Saku Sporting II (N.II 2nd)	1–3	0–1

Naiste Teine liiga

Pos	Team	Pld	W	D	L	GF	GA	GD	Pts	Promotion, qualification or relegation
1	Kohila Püsivus & JK Saarepiiga ÜN (C, P)	17	14	1	2	103	20	+83	43	Naiste Esiliiga
2	Saku Sporting II (P)	17	10	4	3	48	20	+28	34	Play-off for Naiste Esiliiga
3	Rakvere JK Tarvas	17	11	1	5	62	32	+30	34	
4	Paide Linnanaiskond II	17	7	2	8	54	59	−5	23	
5	Tallinna FC Flora III (Note: Reserve teams are ineligible for promotion (parent team is playing one division higher).)	16	7	1	8	56	57	−1	22	
6	FC Elva II	16	7	0	9	33	55	−22	21	
7	Tartu NJK Electra & FC Jõgeva Wolves ÜN	16	4	1	11	24	68	−44	13	
8	JK Narva Trans (D)	14	0	0	14	5	74	−69	0	Disqualified

Source: EJL
Rules for classification: 1) Points; 2) Less matches awarded against; 3) Head-to-head points; 4) Head-to-head goal difference; 5) Matches won; 6) Goal difference; 7) Goals scored; 8) Away goals scored; 9) Fair-play ranking.
(C) Champions; (D) Disqualified; (P) Promoted

==== Women's Baltic Football League ====
The 2026 season of the Women's Baltic Football League featured six teams, with two representatives from each of the Baltic states. Estonia was represented by Naiste Meistriliiga champions Tallinna FC Flora and runners-up Saku Sporting, Latvia by league champions Riga FC Women and runners-up RFS Women, and Lithuania by champions FK Gintra and third-placed MFA Žalgiris-MRU. The second-placed Lithuanian side FK TransINVEST declined its place in the competition. The six teams played a single round-robin main phase, with the top four advancing to the semi-finals, followed by the final and third-place match.

Riga FC Women won the competition for the second consecutive year, defeating MFA Žalgiris-MRU 7–0 in the final on 15 August. FK Gintra secured third place after beating RFS Women 5–0 in the third-place match.

Pos	Team	Pld	W	D	L	GF	GA	GD	Pts	Promotion, qualification or relegation
1	(Latvia) Riga FC	4	2	2	0	12	3	+9	8	Championship play-off semifinal
2	(Lithuania) MFA Žalgiris-MRU	4	2	2	0	12	3	+9	8	Championship play-off semifinal
3	(Latvia) FK RFS	4	2	1	1	9	5	+4	7	Championship play-off semifinal
4	(Lithuania) FC Gintra	4	2	1	1	11	6	+5	7	Championship play-off semifinal
5	(Estonia) Tallinna FC Flora	4	1	0	3	2	12	−10	3	
6	(Estonia) Saku Sporting	4	0	0	4	1	18	−17	0	

Source: EJL
Rules for classification: 1) Points; 2) Less matches awarded against; 3) Head-to-head points; 4) Head-to-head goal difference; 5) Matches won; 6) Goal difference; 7) Goals scored; 8) Fair-play ranking; 9) Draw.

Semifinals
1	(Latvia) Riga FC	3
4	(Lithuania) FC Gintra	0
3	(Latvia) FK RFS	0 (3)
2	(Lithuania) MFA Žalgiris-MRU	0 (4)

Final
1	(Latvia) Riga FC	7
2	(Lithuania) MFA Žalgiris-MRU	0
Third place
3	(Latvia) FK RFS	0
4	(Lithuania) FC Gintra	5

== Cup competitions ==
Knockout football in 2026 is split between two seasons. The 2025–26 Estonian Cup (Tipneri karikas) resumes in the spring with the quarter-final stage, culminating in the final in May. Simultaneously, the 2026–27 edition of the tournament is set to begin in the summer with preliminary rounds. The season's first silverware is contested in the Estonian Supercup, traditionally held in early March as the curtain-raiser for the league season.

=== Men's cups ===
Tipneri karikavõistlused

Quarterfinals
PL	Paide Linnameeskond	6
EL	JK Tallinna Kalev	0
PL	Pärnu JK Vaprus	2
EL	Tartu JK Welco	1
PL	Tallinna FC Flora	3
PL	FC Nõmme United	1
PL	JK Narva Trans	4
EL	Viimsi JK	3

Semifinals
PL	Paide Linnameeskond	2
PL	Pärnu JK Vaprus	0
PL	Tallinna FC Flora	1
PL	JK Narva Trans	0

Final
PL	Paide Linnameeskond	1
PL	Tallinna FC Flora	5

Home teams listed on top of bracket. (AET): At Extra Time, (PL): Premium liiga, (EL): Esiliiga

Small Cup

Quarterfinals
IIB	Tallinna FC Tamper	1
II	Tabasalu Ulasabat C.F.	0
IIB	Paide Linnameeskond III	2
IIB	Vändra JK Vaprus	1
II	Harju JK Laagri U21	1
III	Tartu Team Helm	0
IIB	Pärnu JK Poseidon	0
III	FC Elva III	3

Semifinals
IIB	Tallinna FC Tamper	0
IIB	Paide Linnameeskond III	1
II	Harju JK Laagri U21	1
III	FC Elva III	0

Final
IIB	Paide Linnameeskond III	2 (3)
II	Harju JK Laagri U21	2 (5)

Home teams listed on top of bracket. (AET): At Extra Time, (ML): Naiste Meistriliiga, (EL): Naiste Esiliiga

=== Women's cups ===
Quarterfinals
ML	Saku Sporting	1 (5)
ML	Tallinna FC Flora	1 (4)
ML	Viimsi JK	+
—	JK Tabasalu	–
EL	Tallinna FC Flora II	2
ML	FC Elva	7
ML	Paide Linnanaiskond	14
EL	Tartu JK Tammeka	0

Semifinals
ML	Saku Sporting	3
ML	Viimsi JK	2
ML	FC Elva	0
ML	Paide Linnanaiskond	5

Final
ML	Saku Sporting	4
ML	Paide Linnanaiskond	1

Home teams listed on top of bracket. (AET): At Extra Time, (ML): Naiste Meistriliiga, (EL): Naiste Esiliiga

== European competitions ==
Estonian clubs represented the nation in the 2026–27 editions of the UEFA Champions League, UEFA Europa League, and UEFA Conference League. As the league champions, FC Flora entered the Champions League qualification path, while the second (FCI Levadia), third (Nõmme Kalju FC) and fourth place (Paide Linnameeskond) finishers from the previous season participated in the Conference League.

=== Men's competitions ===
==== FC Flora ====
8 July 2026 Champions League Q1	FC Flora (Estonia)	2–3	(Georgia (country)) FC Iberia 1999	Tallinn, Estonia
19:00 UTC+3	Kreida 28'; Alamaa 73'	Report	18' Natchkhebia; 21' (pen.) Jinjolava; 75' Kardava	Stadium: Lilleküla Stadium; Attendance: 2,017; Referee: Sandi Putros (Denmark)

14 July 2026 Champions League Q1	FC Iberia 1999 (Georgia (country))	2–2	(Estonia) FC Flora	Tbilisi, Georgia
19:00 UTC+3	Sikharulashvili 13', 36'	Report	69' Varjund; 84' (pen.) Sappinen	Stadium: Mikheil Meskhi Stadium; Attendance: 4,506; Referee: Florian Lata (Albania)

23 July 2026 Conference League Q2	FC Flora (Estonia)	1–0	(Wales) The New Saints F.C.	Tallinn, Estonia
19:00 UTC+3	Valdmets 31'	Report		Stadium: Lilleküla Stadium; Attendance: 1,257; Referee: Kristoffer Karlsson (Sweden)

30 July 2026 Conference League Q2	The New Saints F.C. (Wales)	1–0 (a.e.t.) (2–4 p)	(Estonia) FC Flora	Oswestry, Wales
20:30 UTC+3	B. Wilson 90+1'	Report		Stadium: Park Hall; Attendance: 958; Referee: Vitālijs Spasjoņņikovs (Latvia)
	Penalties
	B. Wilson (penalty missed); Brobbel (penalty scored); Lock (penalty missed); D. Williams (penalty scored)		(penalty scored) Teeväli; (penalty scored) Alliku; (penalty missed) Varjund; (penalty scored) Kalimullin; (penalty scored) Usta

6 August 2026 Conference League Q3	Inter Club d'Escaldes (Andorra)	2–0	(Estonia) FC Flora	Andorra la Vella, Andorra
20:00 UTC+3	Chouaib 5'; Berlanga 62'	Report		Stadium: Estadi Nacional; Attendance: 350; Referee: Stefan Ebner (Austria)

13 August 2026 Conference League Q3	FC Flora (Estonia)	0–4	(Andorra) Inter Club d'Escaldes	Tallinn, Estonia
18:00 UTC+3		Report	17' Molina; 69', 81' Chouaib; 77' Arellano	Stadium: Lilleküla Stadium; Attendance: 2,283; Referee: Pavle Ilić (Serbia)

==== FCI Levadia ====
9 July 2026 Conference League Q1	Caernarfon Town F.C. (Wales)	0–5	(Estonia) FCI Levadia Tallinn	Caernarfon, Wales
20:30 UTC+3		Report	15' Peetson; 41' João Pedro; 45+1' Roosnupp; 47' Ainsalu; 79' Otoo	Stadium: The Oval; Attendance: 1,274; Referee: Dovydas Švėgžda (Lithuania)

16 July 2026 Conference League Q1	FCI Levadia Tallinn (Estonia)	5–0	(Wales) Caernarfon Town F.C.	Tallinn, Estonia
19:30 UTC+3	Otoo 4'; Wendell 21'; João Pedro 33' (pen.); Tambedou 70'; Ainsalu 89'	Report		Stadium: Lilleküla Stadium; Attendance: 1,082; Referee: Ryan Lee (Scotland)

21 July 2026 Conference League Q2	IFK Göteborg (Sweden)	1–2	(Estonia) FCI Levadia Tallinn	Gothenburg, Sweden
20:00 UTC+3	Nwankwo 90+2' (o.g.)	Report	33', 45+1' Gabriel	Stadium: Gamla Ullevi; Attendance: 15,749; Referee: Dmytro Panchyshyn (Ukraine)

30 July 2026 Conference League Q2	FCI Levadia Tallinn (Estonia)	1–3 (a.e.t.)	(Sweden) IFK Göteborg	Tallinn, Estonia
19:30 UTC+3	Skvortsov 120+1'	Report	57', 93' Bergmark Wiberg; 103' Alioum	Stadium: Lilleküla Stadium; Attendance: 7,725; Referee: Sigurd Kringstad (Norway)

==== Nõmme Kalju FC ====
9 July 2026 Conference League Q1	Nõmme Kalju FC (Estonia)	1–0	(Northern Ireland) Linfield F.C.	Pärnu, Estonia
19:00 UTC+3	Baptista 47'	Report		Stadium: Pärnu Rannastaadion (Note: Nõmme Kalju will play their home matches at Pärnu Rannastaadion in Pärnu instead of their own stadium, Hiiu Stadium in Tallinn, which does not fulfill UEFA requirements.); Attendance: 712; Referee: Andreu Simarro (Andorra)

16 July 2026 Conference League Q1	Linfield F.C. (Northern Ireland)	2–2	(Estonia) Nõmme Kalju FC	Belfast, Northern Ireland
21:45 UTC+3	McGee 11'; Offord 49'	Report	27' Musolitin; 90+2' Orlov	Stadium: Windsor Park; Attendance: 2,603; Referee: Jacob Karlsen (Denmark)

23 July 2026 Conference League Q2	Shelbourne F.C. (Republic of Ireland)	5–2	(Estonia) Nõmme Kalju FC	Dublin, Ireland
21:45 UTC+3	Freitas 3'; Moore 21', 47'; Coote 25'; Ring 89'	Report	40', 90+1' Esono	Stadium: Tolka Park; Attendance: 3,357; Referee: Szabolcs Kovacs (Romania)

30 July 2026 Conference League Q2	Nõmme Kalju FC (Estonia)	2–1	(Republic of Ireland) Shelbourne F.C.	Pärnu, Estonia
19:00 UTC+3	Esono 49'; Jabir 75'	Report	14' Kelly	Stadium: Pärnu Rannastaadion, Pärnu; Attendance: 452; Referee: Jóhan Hendrik Ellefsen (Faroe Islands)

==== Paide Linnameeskond ====
9 July 2026 Conference League Q1	FC Hegelmann (Lithuania)	1–1	(Estonia) Paide Linnameeskond	Raudondvaris, Lithuania
19:00 UTC+3	Armanavičius 45+1'	Report	37' Badamosi	Stadium: Raudondvaris Stadium; Attendance: 510; Referee: Cihan Aydın (Turkey)

16 July 2026 Conference League Q1	Paide Linnameeskond (Estonia)	3–0	(Lithuania) FC Hegelmann	Pärnu, Estonia
19:00 UTC+3	Sohna 17'; Badamosi 42'; Piht 69'	Report		Stadium: Pärnu Rannastaadion (Note: Paide play their home matches at Pärnu Rannastaadion in Pärnu instead of their own stadium, the Paide kunstmuruväljak in Paide, which does not fulfill UEFA requirements.); Attendance: 1,140; Referee: Stojancho Trpchevski (North Macedonia)

23 July 2026 Conference League Q2	Paide Linnameeskond (Estonia)	1–0	(Azerbaijan) Zira FK	Pärnu, Estonia
19:00 UTC+3	Abdou 87'	Report		Stadium: Pärnu Rannastaadion; Attendance: 943; Referee: Roman Jitari (Moldova)

30 July 2026 Conference League Q2	Zira FK (Azerbaijan)	1–1	(Estonia) Paide Linnameeskond	Sumgayit, Azerbaijan
19:00 UTC+3	Aydın 5'	Report	71' Anier	Stadium: Sumgayit City Stadium (Note: Zira will play their home matches at Sumgayit City Stadium in Sumgait instead of their own stadium, Zira Olympic Sport Complex Stadium in Zira, which does not fulfill UEFA requirements.); Attendance: 1,500; Referee: Dario Bel (Croatia)

23 July 2026 Conference League Q3	Paide Linnameeskond (Estonia)	1–4	(Austria) SK Rapid Wien	Tallinn, Estonia
19:00 UTC+3	D. Luts 41'	Report	5' (pen.) Bolla; 83', 90+4' Haïdara; 85' Dahl	Stadium: Lilleküla Stadium, Tallinn (Note: Starting from the third qualifying round, Paide played their home matches at Lilleküla Stadium in Tallinn, rather than at Pärnu Rannastaadion in Pärnu, to meet UEFA requirements.); Attendance: 5,569; Referee: Danilo Nikolić (Serbia)

12 August 2026 Conference League Q3	SK Rapid Wien (Austria)	2–0	(Estonia) Paide Linnameeskond	Vienna, Austria
19:00 UTC+3	Tilio 38'; Schaub 82' (pen.)	Report		Stadium: Allianz Stadion; Attendance: 13,705; Referee: Denys Shurman (Ukraine)

== Notable transfers ==
Players are listed in an alphabetical order. An orange row shows that a player has changed foreign clubs and inside Meistriliiga – the earlier transfer is coloured orange. Player's last team is listed as "free agent" if he has not represented a team in the previous six months. Player's next team is listed as "free agent" if he has not found a new club within the following six months.

=== Inside Meistriliiga ===
Listed are players, who have joined or left a club participating in the 2026 Meistriliiga. The player must have represented the Estonian national team at least once. The list may also contain more known players, who have either changed their club inside the lower leagues or retired from football.

Name	Pos.	Age	From	To	Date	Notes	Ref
Ilja Antonov	MF	33	FC Kuressaare	Tallinna FC Flora	01.01	Signed a contract with Flora.	
Henri Järvelaid	DF	27	Tallinna FCI Levadia	FC Nõmme United	02.01	Signed a 1-year contract with United.	
Ken Kallaste	DF	37	Tallinna FCI Levadia	retired	01.01	Contract with Levadia ended. Started a coaching career.	
Kristofer Käit	DF	21	(Portugal) Portimonense S.C. U23	Paide Linnameeskond	02.08	Signed a contract with Paide.	
Mark Anders Lepik	FW	25	Tallinna FC Flora	Pärnu JK Vaprus	02.01	Signed a 1-year loan deal with Vaprus.	
Marco Lukka	DF	29	Tallinna FC Flora	FC Kuressaare	02.01	Signed a 2-year contract with Kuressaare.	
Pavel Marin	MF	30	Nõmme Kalju FC	Tartu JK Tammeka	06.01	Signed a contract with Tammeka.	
Joseph Saliste	DF	30	Paide Linnameeskond	Tallinna FCI Levadia	01.01	Contract with Paide ended. Signed a 3-year contract with Levadia.	
Erik Sorga	FW	27	(Faroe Islands) Havnar Bóltfelag	Tallinna FC Flora	01.07	Contract with HB terminated. Signed a contract with Flora.	
Edgar Tur	DF	29	Tallinna FCI Levadia	Paide Linnameeskond	01.01	Signed a contract with Paide.	
Andreas Vaher	DF	22	Tallinna FC Flora	Harju JK Laagri	18.08	Signed a contract with Harju.	

=== Outside Meistriliiga ===
Listed are all Estonian footballers, who have joined or left a foreign team.

Name	Pos.	Age	From	To	Date	Notes	Ref
Karl Jakob Hein	GK	24	(Germany) SV Werder Bremen	(England) Arsenal F.C.	30.06	Loan deal with Bremen ended.	
Karl Jakob Hein	GK	24	(England) Arsenal F.C.	(Germany) SV Werder Bremen	01.07	Signed a 4-year contract with Bremen.	
Kristo Hussar	DF	23	Tallinna FC Flora	(Slovakia) AS Trenčín	16.02	Signed a 1.5+1-year contract with Trenčín.	
Markus Kaalma	FW	16	Viimsi JK	(Norway) Kristiansund BK II	01.08	Signed a contract with Kristiansund.	
Andero Kaares	FW	17	Tallinna FC Flora	(Spain) Villarreal CF U19	04.07	Signed a contract with Villarreal.	
Nikita Komissarov	MF	25	(Lithuania) FA Šiauliai	(Lithuania) FK Minija	13.02	Signed a contract with Minija.	
Märten Kuusk	DF	30	(Poland) GKS Katowice	(Poland) Polonia Warsaw	13.07	Signed a 2+1-year contract with Polonia.	
Aleksandr Lohmatov	MF	19	(Italy) Frosinone Calcio U20	(Slovakia) FK Pohronie	04.02	Signed a contract with Pohronie.	
Karol Mets	DF	33	(Germany) FC St. Pauli	(Germany) VfL Bochum	17.07	Signed a 2-year contract with Bochum.	
Nikita Mihhailov	MF	23	Tallinna FC Flora	(Slovakia) MFK Zemplín Michalovce	11.03	Signed a 2-year contract with Zemplín.	
Marten-Chris Paalberg	FW	17	Pärnu JK Vaprus	(France) AS Saint-Étienne	02.02	Signed a 2.5-year contract with Saint-Étienne.	
Kevor Palumets	MF	23	(Slovakia) FK Železiarne Podbrezová	(Slovakia) FC Košice	04.07	Signed a 2+1-year contract with Košice.	
Markus Poom	MF	26	Tallinna FC Flora	(Slovakia) AS Trenčín	03.02	Signed a 1.5+1-year contract with Trenčín.	
Sten Reinkort	FW	27	Paide Linnameeskond	(Portugal) S.C. Espinho	01.02	Signed a 0.5-year contract with Espinho.	
Rauno Sappinen	FW	30	Tallinna FC Flora	(Cyprus) Olympiakos Nicosia	18.08	Signed a 1+1-year contract with Olympiakos.	
Michael Schjönning-Larsen	DF	24	Tallinna FCI Levadia	(Scotland) Kilmarnock F.C.	01.01	Contract with Levadia ended. Signed a 1.5-year contract with Kilmarnock.	
Rocco Robert Shein	MF	22	(Norway) Fredrikstad FK	(England) Portsmouth F.C.	13.07	Signed a 3-year contract with Portsmouth.	
Ramol Sillamaa	DF	21	Harju JK Laagri	(Sweden) Jönköpings Södra IF	04.08	Signed a 0.5 year loan deal with Jönköpings.	
Vlasiy Sinyavskiy	DF	29	(Czech Republic) Bohemians 1905	(Czech Republic) FC Baník Ostrava	06.01	Signed a 2-year contract with Banik.	
Markus Soomets	MF	26	(Norway) IK Start	(Denmark) Kolding IF	20.08	Signed a 3-year contract with Kolding.	
Erik Sorga	FW	26	free agent	(Faroe Islands) Havnar Bóltfelag	28.02	Signed a contract with HB.	
Aleksandr Šapovalov	FW	22	(Greece) Niki Volos F.C.	(Greece) Egaleo F.C.	16.01	Signed a 0.5-year contract with Egaleo.	
Aleksandr Šapovalov	FW	23	(Greece) Egaleo F.C.	(Greece) Hellas Syros F.C.	01.07	Contract with Egaleo ended. Signed a 1-year contract with Syros.	
Erko Jonne Tõugjas	DF	22	Tallinna FC Flora	(Sweden) Halmstads BK	01.01	Signed a 3-year contract with Halmstads.	
Alex Matthias Tamm	FW	24	(Slovenia) NK Olimpija Ljubljana	(Scotland) Livingston F.C.	08.01	Signed a 0.5-year loan deal with Livingston.	
Georgi Tunjov	MF	24	(Italy) AC Ospitaletto Franciacorta	(Italy) Aurora Pro Patria 1919	22.01	Signed a 0.5-year contract with Egaleo.	
Georgi Tunjov	MF	25	(Italy) Aurora Pro Patria 1919	(Italy) AS Sambenedettese	01.07	Contract with Aurora ended. Signed a contract with Sambenedettese.	

=== Foreign signings ===
Listed are all foreign players that have joined or left a team participating in the 2026 Meistriliiga.

Name	Pos.	Age	From	To	Date	Notes	Ref
(Brazil) Pedro Andrade	DF	20	(Brazil) São Paulo FC U20	Paide Linnameeskond	07.01	Signed a contract with Paide.	
(France) Joachim Amijekori	MF	22	(Armenia) FC Syunik	Tartu JK Tammeka	23.07	Signed a 1.5-year contract with Tammeka.	
(Ivory Coast) Yann Emmanuel Assale	FW	18	(Ivory Coast) CF Casy-Foot	Harju JK Laagri	14.08	Signed a contract with Harju.	
(Ghana) Wisdom Awusi	MF	22	(Spain) Córdoba CF B	JK Narva Trans	16.07	Signed a 0.5-year contract with Trans.	
(Canada) Idrissa Bah	DF	20	(Canada) Sigma FC	Harju JK Laagri	27.02	Signed a 1-year contract with Harju.	
(Guinea) Moustapha Bah	FW	20	Tallinna FCI Levadia	(Spain) CF Peralada	12.02	Contract with Levadia ended. Signed a 0.5-year contract with Peralada.	
(Latvia) Ivans Baturins	GK	28	Harju JK Laagri	(Latvia) FK Tukums 2000	01.03	Contract with Harju ended. Signed a contract with Tukums.	
(Argentina) Tomas Berardozzi	DF	23	(Spain) CD Arenteiro	JK Narva Trans	20.07	Signed a 0.5-year contract with Trans.	
(Brazil) Jhonathan Bernardo	FW	20	Nõmme Kalju FC	(Brazil) Esporte Clube Democrata	13.02	Contract with Kalju terminated. Signed a contract with Democrata.	
(Cameroon) Mollo Bessala	FW	22	(Ukraine) LNZ Cherkasy	Tallinna FCI Levadia	09.08	Signed a 3.5-year contract with Levadia.	
(Canada) Abdul Wahid Binate	FW	23	free agent	Harju JK Laagri	19.02	Signed a 1-year contract with Harju.	
(Ukraine) Dmytro Bondar	DF	27	JK Narva Trans	(Lithuania) FK Riteriai	27.02	Contract with Trans ended. Signed a new contract with Riteriai.	
(Georgia (country)) Shalva Burjanadze	DF	27	JK Narva Trans	free agent	15.08	Contract with Trans terminated.	
(Brazil) Daniel Cabral	MF	23	(Portugal) Estrela Amadora	Paide Linnameeskond	09.02	Signed a 3-year contract with Paide.	
(The Gambia) Pa Abdou Cham	FW	19	(The Gambia) Real de Banjul	Paide Linnameeskond	09.01	Made loan deal with Paide permanent and signed a 3-year contract.	
(Zambia) Benjamine Chisala	FW	21	(Zambia) Atletico Lusaka F.C.	FC Nõmme United	01.01	Made loan deal with United permanent and signed a 2-year contract.	
(Portugal) Afonso Correia	MF	24	JK Narva Trans	(Andorra) FC Ordino	01.02	Contract with Trans ended. Signed a new contract with Ordino.	
(The Gambia) Dawda Darboe	FW	22	(The Gambia) Fortune FC	Paide Linnameeskond	21.08	Signed a 2.5-year contract with Paide.	
(Serbia) Milan Delevic	DF	27	Paide Linnameeskond	(Lithuania) FK Panevėžys	21.01	Contract with Paide ended. Signed a 1-year contract with Panevėžys.	
(Portugal) Idalecio Dias	FW	22	(Portugal) S.C. Braga U23	Nõmme Kalju FC	09.08	Signed a 3.5+1-year contract with Kalju.	
(Serbia) Dražen Dubačkić	DF	26	Paide Linnameeskond	(Serbia) FK FAP	09.02	Contract with Paide ended. Signed a contract with FAP.	
(Ghana) David Epton	MF	21	Tartu JK Tammeka	(Kazakhstan) FC Caspiy	25.06	Signed a 0.5-year contract with Caspiy.	
(United States) Tristin Evans	FW	21	(United States) Rose City FC	FC Nõmme United	23.08	Signed a contract with United.	
(Switzerland) Simon Geiger	DF	24	free agent	FC Nõmme United	20.08	Signed a 0.5-year contract with United.	
(Brazil) Geovani	FW	25	(South Korea) Daegu FC	Tallinna FCI Levadia	23.08	Signed a 2.5-year contract with Levadia.	
(Nigeria) Luqman Gilmore	MF	29	Paide Linnameeskond	(Tunisia) US Monastir	13.01	Signed a contract with Monastir.	
(Senegal) Mouhamed Gueye	MF	22	Paide Linnameeskond	free agent	27.01	Contract with Paide terminated.	
(The Gambia) Muhammed Hydara	MF	21	(Latvia) FS Jelgava	Tartu JK Tammeka	04.02	Signed a 1-year loan deal with Tammeka.	
(Nigeria) Chilem Williams Ignatius	FW	19	Tartu JK Tammeka	(Greece) Panthrakikos F.C.	13.08	Contract with Tammeka terminated. Signed a 1.5-year contract with Panthrakikos.	
(The Gambia) Momodou Jobarteh	FW	19	(The Gambia) Real de Banjul FC	Paide Linnameeskond	19.01	Signed a 4-year contract with Paide.	
(Nigeria) Imoh John	FW	18	free agent	JK Narva Trans	07.03	Signed a 1-year contract with Trans.	
(Finland) Oliver Kangaslahti	DF	25	(Finland) FF Jaro	Tartu JK Tammeka	27.01	Signed a 2-year contract with Tammeka.	
(Ghana) Mahamud Karimu	MF	22	Harju JK Laagri	(Latvia) DSVK Traktors	01.03	Contract with Harju ended. Signed a contract with Traktors.	
(Sierra Leone) Osman Koroma	FW	24	(Cyprus) Iraklis Gerolakkou	Tartu JK Tammeka	29.07	Signed a contract with Tammeka.	
(Ukraine) Mykhaylo Kozhushko	FW	20	JK Narva Trans	free agent	23.07	Contract with Trans terminated.	
(Georgia (country)) Nikoloz Kutateladze	FW	25	(Georgia (country)) FC Rustavi	Tallinna FCI Levadia	09.08	Signed a contract with Levadia.	
(Brazil) Thomas Lisboa	MF	21	(Brazil) SC Corinthians Paulista U20	Tartu JK Tammeka	20.02	Signed a 3-year contract with Tammeka.	
(Brazil) Pedro Manoel	DF	20	(Brazil) Mirassol Futebol Clube U20	Tartu JK Tammeka	02.03	Signed a 3-year contract with Tammeka.	
(Slovenia) Til Mavretic	MF	28	Tallinna FCI Levadia	(Uzbekistan) FC Dinamo Samarqand	19.01	Contract with Levadia ended. Signed a 1-year contract with Dinamo.	
(Brazil) Kaua Miranda	FW	18	(Brazil) Red Bull Bragantino U20	JK Narva Trans	07.03	Signed a 3-year contract with Trans.	
(Japan) Yosuke Morishige	DF	21	(Brazil) Cianorte FC	FC Nõmme United	11.02	Signed a 1+1-year contract with United.	
(Netherlands) Richie Musaba	MF	25	Tallinna FCI Levadia	(Slovakia) AS Trenčín	29.01	Contract with Levadia ended. Signed a 1.5-year contract with Trenčín.	
(Canada) Joseph Ndakala	FW	18	(Canada) Archbishop O'Leary Spartans	Harju JK Laagri	04.03	Signed a 1-year contract with Harju.	
(Nigeria) Abraham Nwankwo	DF	24	(Slovenia) NK Domžale	Tallinna FCI Levadia	05.02	Signed a contract with Levadia.	
(Nigeria) Ganiu Atanda Ogungbe	DF	20	Tartu JK Tammeka	(Maldives) Odi Sports Club	02.03	Contract with Tammeka ended. Signed a contract with Odi.	
(Netherlands) Koen Oostenbrink	MF	26	(Lithuania) DFK Dainava	FC Nõmme United	11.02	Signed a 1-year contract with United.	
(Ghana) Dacosta Owusu	MF	21	(Ghana) Golden Kick SC	FC Nõmme United	01.01	Made loan deal with United permanent and signed a 1-year contract.	
(Colombia) Juan Palacios	FW	20	(Brazil) Fluminense FC U20	Paide Linnameeskond	17.08	Signed a 2.5-year contract with Paide.	
(Brazil) Kauan Pereira	FW	19	(Brazil) Santos FC U20	Tartu JK Tammeka	07.03	Signed a 3-year contract with Tammeka.	
(Senegal) Moussa Sambe	FW	20	Viimsi JK	Tallinna FCI Levadia	30.01	Signed a 5-year contract with Levadia.	
(Senegal) Moussa Sambe	FW	20	Tallinna FCI Levadia	Tartu JK Tammeka	11.08	Signed a 0.5-year loan deal with Tammeka.	
(Senegal) Moussa Seck	DF	19	(Belgium) SV Zulte Waregem	Harju JK Laagri	01.08	Signed a 0.5-year loan deal with Harju.	
(England) Harvey Rowe	DF	22	free agent	JK Narva Trans	06.03	Signed a 1+1.5-year contract with Trans.	
(England) Harvey Rowe	DF	22	JK Narva Trans	(Finland) Union Plaani	29.07	Contract with Trans terminated. Signed a 0.5-year contract with Union.	
(The Gambia) Pa Modou Sohna	MF	25	(The Gambia) BST Galaxy FC	Paide Linnameeskond	19.01	Signed a contract with Paide.	
(The Gambia) Bubacarr Tambedou	FW	24	Tallinna FCI Levadia	(Denmark) Sønderjyske Fodbold	04.08	Signed a 4-year contract with Sønderjyske.	
(England) Ezekiel Tanimowo	FW	28	Tartu JK Tammeka	(Kyrgyzstan) FC OshSU-Aldier	14.02	Contract with Tammeka ended. Signed a 1-year contract with OshSU.	
(Puerto Rico) Adyn Torres	MF	18	(United States) Atlanta United FC	FC Nõmme United	23.08	Signed a 0.5-year loan deal with United.	
(Spain) Carlos Torres	MF	19	Tallinna FCI Levadia	(Spain) CD Soneja	04.02	Signed a 0.5-year loan deal with Soneja.	
(Spain) Carlos Torres	MF	19	(Spain) CD Soneja	Tallinna FCI Levadia	30.06	Loan deal with Soneja ended.	
(Spain) Carlos Torres	MF	19	Tallinna FCI Levadia	(Spain) Real Murcia Imperial	08.07	Signed a 1.5-year contract with Murcia.	
(The Gambia) Bubacarr Trawally	FW	31	Paide Linnameeskond	free agent	01.01	Contract with Paide ended.	
(Spain) Iker Venteo	GK	23	(Spain) Sporting Atlético	JK Narva Trans	09.08	Signed a 0.5-year contract with Trans.	
(Croatia) Roko Vukušic	DF	21	free agent	Nõmme Kalju FC	05.03	Signed a 3-year contract with Kalju.	

=== Managerial changes ===
Listed are all clubs, who play in the top divisions (Meistriliiga, Esiliiga, Esiliiga B), and national teams who changed managers after the end of the 2025 season.

Team	Division	Outgoing manager	Manner of departure	Date of vacancy	Incoming manager	Date of appointment
Tallinna FCI Levadia U21	Esiliiga	(Spain) Santi Garcia	Mutual consent	4 December 2025	Dmitri Kruglov	11 December 2025
Tallinna FCI Levadia	Meistriliiga	(Spain) Curro Torres	Mutual consent	5 December 2025	Vjatšeslav Zahovaiko	6 December 2025
Viimsi JK	Esiliiga	Ivo Lehtmets	Resigned	5 December 2025	Andres Oper; Arli Salm	8 December 2025
Tartu JK Tammeka	Meistriliiga	Siim Valtna	End of interim spell	18 December 2025	Karel Voolaid	18 December 2025
JK Tallinna Kalev	Esiliiga	Alo Bärengrub	Mutual consent	22 December 2025	(Serbia) Ivan Stojković	22 December 2025
Tartu JK Welco	Esiliiga	Jaanus Reitel	Resigned	22 December 2025	Alo Bärengrub	22 December 2025
Tallinna FC Flora U21	Esiliiga	Taavi Viik	Mutual consent	31 December 2025	Ats Sillaste	2 January 2026
FC Nõmme United U21	Esiliiga	Risto Sarapik	Resigned	14 January 2026	Eero Maling	16 January 2026
Paide Linnameeskond	Meistriliiga	Vladimir Vassiljev	Mutual consent	27 April 2026	Tarmo Kink (Finland) Mika Laurikainen	27 April 2026; 26 June 2026
JK Narva Trans	Meistriliiga	(Ukraine) Roman Kozhukhovskyi	Mutual consent	3 June 2026	(Spain) David Campagna	28 June 2026
Tallinna FC Flora	Meistriliiga	Konstantin Vassiljev	Sacked	15 August 2026	Karl Mööl	15 August 2026

== Futsal ==
The 2026 futsal calendar is highlighted by the conclusion of the 2025–26 Saalijalgpalli Meistriliiga in the spring and the start of the subsequent season in the autumn. A major focal point for the year is Estonia's hosting of the FIFA Futsal World Cup 2028 preliminary round qualifiers in April, providing the national team with a significant home-court advantage on the international stage.

=== National team ===
24 January Friendly	Estonia	4–5	Norway	Sillamäe, Estonia
16:00	Vnukov 5', 34'; Desjatski 22'; Rubel 39'	Report	1' Holter; 14' Moen; 23' Ajer; 32' Schjetne; 35' Løkken	Stadium: Sillamäe sports complex Kalev; Attendance: 501; Referee: Jagnar Jakobson (Estonia)

25 January Friendly	Estonia	2–2	Norway	Tallinn, Estonia
15:00	Bažkov 32'; Savikink 39'	Report	3' Løkken; 5' Moen	Stadium: Sõle sports center Attendance: 173; Referee: Vilde Stenseth (Norway)

11 April 2028 WC Q — PR	Norway	0–0	Estonia	Jõhvi, Estonia
19:00		Report		Stadium: Jõhvi sports hall Attendance: 353; Referee: Radim Cep (Czech Republic)

12 April 2028 WC Q — PR	Estonia	4–4	Israel	Jõhvi, Estonia
19:00	Rebane 15'; Vnukov 30', 31'; Savikink 40'	Report	14', 39' Halevy; 28' Bar-El; 37' Ben Aharon	Stadium: Jõhvi sports hall Attendance: 352; Referee: Daniele D'adamo (San Marino)

14 April 2028 WC Q — PR	Estonia	4–3	Greece	Jõhvi, Estonia
19:00	Matinaro 15'; Vnukov 21', 26'; Männi 38'	Report	10', 24' Ntatis; 38' Anastasopoulos	Stadium: Jõhvi sports hall Attendance: 401; Referee: Daniele D'adamo (San Marino)

11 September Futsal Week Cup	Estonia	6–2	Montenegro	Poreč, Croatia
12:00	Vnukov 8', 27', 34'; Gussev 15', 39'; Savikink 26'	Report	17' Cimbaljevic; 23' Nikolic	Stadium: Finida Hall; Referee: Nejc Dušcak

12 September Futsal Week Cup	Romania	5–1	Estonia	Poreč, Croatia
12:00	Andor 9', 17'; Nastai 23'; Stüf 29' (o.g.); Hadnagy 40'	Report	10' Männi	Stadium: Finida Hall; Referee: Grigori Ošomkov (Estonia)

15 October 2028 WC Q — MR	Slovakia	4–1	Estonia	Lučenec, Slovakia
19:00	Zaťovič 02'52"; Ševčík 03'52"; Drahovský 04'40", 16'10"	Report	16'44" Stüf	Stadium: Športová hala Arena; Referee: Dag Erik Tangvik (Norway), Telmen Undrakh (Norway)

20 October 2028 WC Q — MR	Estonia	2–9	Ukraine	Rakvere, Estonia
19:00	Vnukov 01'53"; Shved 12'15" (o.g.)	Report	00'34", 12'05", 17'24" Abakshyn; 09'43", 14'34" Mykytiuk; 10'55" Semenchenko; 19'56" Cherniavskyi; 25'13" Danyliuk; 31'14" Prykhodko	Stadium: Rakvere Spordikeskus; Attendance: 739; Referee: Pablo Delgado Sastre (Spain), Javier Moreno Reina (Spain)

9 December 2028 WC Q — MR	Estonia	v	Slovakia	Jõhvi, Estonia
		Report		Stadium: Jõhvi Spordihall

=== League system ===
Saalijalgpalli Meistriliiga

Pos	Team	Pld	W	D	L	GF	GA	GD	Pts	Promotion, qualification or relegation
1	Tallinna FC Bunker Partner	14	12	2	0	97	33	+64	38	Championship play-off semifinal
2	Narva United FC	14	9	1	4	91	57	+34	28	Championship play-off semifinal
3	Tartu Ravens Futsal	14	8	2	4	97	51	+46	26	Championship play-off quarterfinal
4	Saku Sporting	14	7	2	5	73	49	+24	23	Championship play-off quarterfinal
5	Silla FC Phoenix	14	6	1	7	86	68	+18	19	Championship play-off quarterfinal
6	Tallinna FC Qarabag	14	5	3	6	61	73	−12	18	Championship play-off quarterfinal
7	Rummu Dünamo (R)	14	3	1	10	50	107	−57	10	Play-offs for Saalijalgpalli Esiliiga
8	Tartu FC Inter (R)	14	0	0	14	28	145	−117	0	Saalijalgpalli Esiliiga

Source: EJL
Rules for classification: 1) Points; 2) Less matches awarded against; 3) Head-to-head points; 4) Head-to-head goal difference; 5) Matches won; 6) Goal difference; 7) Goals scored; 8) Draw.
(R) Relegated

Play-offs:

Quarterfinal
3	Tartu Ravens Futsal	2	5	5	1
6	Tallinna FC Qarabag	3	4	8	2
4	Saku Sporting	7	5	4 (5)	2
5	Silla FC Phoenix	8	2	4 (3)	1

Semifinal
1	Tallinna FC Bunker Partner	11	7	–	2
6	Tallinna FC Qarabag	3	6	–	0
2	Narva United FC	4	4	5	2
4	Saku Sporting	1	5	4	1

Final
1	Tallinna FC Bunker Partner	11	11	9	3
2	Narva United FC	5	2	4	0
3rd place
4	Saku Sporting	0
6	Tallinna FC Qarabag	8

Relegation play-off:

Team 1	Agg.	Team 2	1st leg	2nd leg
FC Freedom (S. Esiliiga 2nd)	0–2	Rummu Dünamo (S. Meistriliiga 7th)	3–5	5–7 AET

Saalijalgpalli Esiliiga

Pos	Team	Pld	W	D	L	GF	GA	GD	Pts	Promotion, qualification or relegation
1	SJK Hagalaz (C, P)	14	14	0	0	145	39	+106	42	Saalijalgpalli Meistriliiga
2	FC Freedom	14	9	1	4	60	41	+19	28	Play-offs for Saalijalgpalli Meistriliiga
3	Sillamäe Silla FC II (Note: Reserve teams are ineligible for promotion (parent team is playing one division higher).)	14	7	4	3	85	56	+29	25	
4	Raplamaa JK Futsal	14	7	1	6	83	91	−8	22	
5	Narva United FC II	14	7	1	6	91	62	+29	22	
6	Ravens Futsal & FC Otepää ÜM	14	4	1	9	73	82	−9	13	
7	FC Jõgeva Wolves ESTPLY	14	4	0	10	66	117	−51	12	
8	Ida-Viru Dina JK Noova Futsal	14	0	0	14	46	161	−115	0	

Source: EJL
Rules for classification: 1) Points; 2) Less matches awarded against; 3) Head-to-head points; 4) Head-to-head goal difference; 5) Matches won; 6) Goal difference; 7) Goals scored; 8) Draw.
(C) Champions; (P) Promoted
Notes:

Futsal's Cup

Quarterfinals
SML	Tartu FC Inter	1
SRL	Võru FC Helios	8
SEL	SJK Hagalaz	2
SML	Narva United FC	6
SML	Saku Sporting	2
SML	Tallinna FC Bunker Partner	5
SML	Silla FC Phoenix	4
SML	Tartu Ravens Futsal	3

Semifinals
SRL	Võru FC Helios	4
SML	Narva United FC	14
SML	Tallinna FC Bunker Partner	5
SML	Silla FC Phoenix	3

Final
SML	Narva United FC	3
SML	Tallinna FC Bunker Partner	7

Home teams listed on top of bracket. (AET): At Extra Time, (SML): Saalijalgpalli Meistriliiga, (SEL): Saalijalgpalli Esiliiga, (SRL): Saalijalgpalli rahvaliiga

== Beach soccer ==
The 2026 beach soccer season is concentrated in the summer months, primarily through the Läänemere rannajalgpalliliiga (Baltic Beach Soccer League). The Estonia national beach soccer team is scheduled to compete in the Euro Beach Soccer League, continuing its push to remain among the top-tier nations in the European beach soccer rankings.
