= 2026 Meistriliiga =

Meistriliiga
- Season: 2026
- Dates: 7 March 2026 – 7 November 2026
- Champions: FCI Levadia (12th title)
- Relegated: Narva Trans
- Champions League: FCI Levadia
- Conference League: Paide Linnameeskond; Flora
- Matches: 180
- Goals: 558 (3.1 per match)
- Top goalscorer: Wendell (20 goals)
- Biggest home win: FCI Levadia 7–0 Narva Trans (26 April 2026)
- Biggest away win: Vaprus 1–6 FCI Levadia (24 May 2026); Tammeka 0–5 Vaprus (7 November 2026)
- Highest scoring: Nõmme United 7–1 Vaprus (14 March 2026); Nõmme Kalju 7–1 Nõmme United (22 April 2026)
- Longest winning run: 10 matches FCI Levadia
- Longest unbeaten run: 18 matches FCI Levadia
- Longest winless run: 14 matches Narva Trans
- Longest losing run: 7 matches Narva Trans

The 2026 Meistriliiga, also known as A. Le Coq Premium Liiga due to sponsorship reasons, was the 36th season of the Meistriliiga, the top Estonian league for association football clubs since its establishment in 1992. The season began on 7 March 2026 and concluded in November.

Flora were the defending champions, but were unable to defend their title, with FCI Levadia winning their 12th league title with a record six games to spare.

== Teams ==
The league consists of ten teams; the top nine teams of the previous season, and one team promoted from the Esiliiga. Flora entered the season as defending champions.

The promoted team was the 2025 Esiliiga champions Nõmme United (returning to the Meistriliiga after a single-season absence). They replaced the 2025 Meistriliiga bottom-placed team Tallinna Kalev (relegated from the Meistriliiga after four seasons).

=== Stadiums and locations ===
Locations of the 2026 Meistriliiga teams

Team	Location	Stadium	Capacity
FCI Levadia	Tallinn	A. Le Coq Arena	14,336
Flora	Tallinn	A. Le Coq Arena	14,336
Harju	Laagri	Laagri Stadium	500
Kuressaare	Kuressaare	Kuressaare linnastaadion	1,000
Narva Trans	Narva	Narva Kalev-Fama Stadium	700
Nõmme Kalju	Tallinn	Hiiu Stadium	570
Nõmme United	Tallinn	Männiku Stadium	500
Paide Linnameeskond	Paide	Paide kunstmuruväljak	542
Tammeka	Tartu	Tartu Tamme Stadium	1,750
Vaprus	Pärnu	Pärnu Rannastaadion	1,501

=== Personnel and kits ===
Team	Manager	Captain	Kit manufacturer	Shirt sponsor
FCI Levadia	(Estonia) Vjatšeslav Zahovaiko	(Estonia) Rasmus Peetson	Macron	Viimsi Keevitus
Flora	(Estonia) Karl Mööl (interim)	(Estonia) Rauno Alliku	Nike	None
Harju	(Estonia) Lauri Nuuma	(Estonia) Andres Järve	Adidas	FenixBet
Kuressaare	(Estonia) Sander Post	(Estonia) Karl-Romet Nõmm	Nike	Visit Saaremaa
Narva Trans	(Spain) David Campaña	(Estonia) Mark Maksimkin	Nike	Sportland
Nõmme Kalju	(Russia) Nikita Andreev	(Estonia) Henri Perk	Macron	None
Nõmme United	(United States) Eric Wynalda	(Estonia) Andre Frolov	Adidas	TonyBet
Paide Linnameeskond	(Estonia) Tarmo Kink	(Estonia) Henrik Ojamaa	Capelli	Verston
Tammeka	(Estonia) Karel Voolaid	(Finland) Oliver Kangaslahti	Nike	Livida
Vaprus	(Estonia) Igor Prins	(Estonia) Magnus Villota	Nike	Coolbet

=== Managerial changes ===
Team	Outgoing manager	Manner of departure	Date of vacancy	Position in the table	Incoming manager	Date of appointment
Tammeka	(Estonia) Siim Valtna	End of interim spell	8 November 2025	Pre-season	(Estonia) Karel Voolaid	18 December 2025
FCI Levadia	(Spain) Curro Torres	End of contract	5 December 2025	Pre-season	(Estonia) Vjatšeslav Zahovaiko	6 December 2025
Paide Linnameeskond	(Estonia) Vladimir Vassiljev	Sacked	27 April 2026	3rd	(Estonia) Tarmo Kink	27 April 2026
Narva Trans	(Ukraine) Roman Kozhukhovskyi	Sacked	3 June 2026	10th	(Ivory Coast) Irié (interim)	10 June 2026
Narva Trans	(Ivory Coast) Irié	End of interim spell	28 June 2026	10th	(Spain) David Campaña	28 June 2026
Flora	(Estonia) Konstantin Vassiljev	Sacked	15 August 2026	3rd	(Estonia) Karl Mööl (interim)	15 August 2026
Nõmme United	(Poland) Sławomir Cisakowski	Sacked	6 September 2026	9th	(United States) Eric Wynalda	7 September 2026

== League table ==
Pos	Team	Pld	W	D	L	GF	GA	GD	Pts	Qualification or relegation
1	FCI Levadia (C)	36	28	7	1	97	29	+68	91	Qualification for the Champions League first qualifying round
2	Paide Linnameeskond	36	19	7	10	56	43	+13	64	Qualification for the Conference League first qualifying round (Note: The 2026–27 Estonian Cup winners also qualify for the Conference League first qualifying round (or the fourth-placed team of the Meistriliiga if the Estonian Cup winners finish in the top three).)
3	Flora	36	20	2	14	68	51	+17	62	Qualification for the Conference League first qualifying round
4	Nõmme Kalju	36	18	7	11	61	36	+25	61	
5	Tammeka	36	17	2	17	50	60	−10	53	
6	Harju	36	15	2	19	51	55	−4	47	
7	Vaprus	36	11	7	18	51	69	−18	40	
8	Nõmme United	36	12	2	22	59	81	−22	38	
9	Kuressaare (Q)	36	10	7	19	36	55	−19	37	Qualification for the Meistriliiga play-off
10	Narva Trans (R)	36	6	5	25	29	79	−50	23	Relegation to the Esiliiga

Source: A. Le Coq Premium liiga
Rules for classification: 1) Points; 2) Less matches awarded against; 3) Head-to-head points; 4) Head-to-head goal difference; 5) Matches won; 6) Goal difference; 7) Goals scored; 8) Away goals scored; 9) Fair-play points; 10) Draw
(C) Champions; (Q) Qualified for the phase indicated; (R) Relegated

== Results ==
Teams face each other four times (twice at home and twice away).

Home \ Away	LEV	FCF	HJKL	FCK	NAR	NKFC	NUN	PLM	TAM	VAP
FCI Levadia		4–0	3–0	2–0	7–0	1–1	1–1	2–2	6–0	2–1
FCI Levadia		1–2	2–1	4–0	4–0	2–2	5–0	1–0	2–1	4–0
Flora	1–3		5–0	2–1	6–0	0–1	3–0	1–2	3–2	2–0
Flora	1–3		1–0	2–3	2–0	2–1	1–2	1–2	2–0	3–2
Harju	1–3	2–0		2–3	3–0	0–2	1–3	2–2	1–0	1–2
Harju	1–2	3–1		0–0	3–0	1–0	2–0	5–2	0–2	2–0
Kuressaare	1–2	0–3	3–2		0–0	0–2	2–1	0–1	3–2	0–1
Kuressaare	0–2	2–0	3–2		3–1	0–0	1–1	0–1	1–3	2–2
Narva Trans	1–3	0–3	1–2	1–2		0–3	1–2	1–0	3–0	2–1
Narva Trans	1–1	2–2	3–1	0–1		0–2	0–1	1–1	0–2	3–1
Nõmme Kalju	1–1	0–1	1–0	4–0	2–1		7–1	1–1	1–2	1–2
Nõmme Kalju	2–3	2–1	0–1	1–0	2–0		1–2	1–1	5–1	3–1
Nõmme United	1–2	0–4	1–2	2–1	5–1	1–3		2–3	2–3	7–1
Nõmme United	3–4	2–3	1–2	3–2	1–2	3–0		1–3	0–1	4–2
Paide Linnameeskond	1–3	1–2	1–0	1–1	1–0	1–0	3–1		0–1	3–1
Paide Linnameeskond	0–2	2–2	1–2	1–0	2–1	0–2	4–1		2–1	2–0
Tammeka	1–2	3–1	2–1	1–0	1–0	0–1	3–1	1–4		0–0
Tammeka	0–1	3–1	2–1	1–0	5–1	1–3	4–0	0–2		0–5
Vaprus	1–6	1–2	0–2	1–0	2–0	3–1	2–3	3–2	0–0	
Vaprus	1–1	1–2	3–2	1–1	2–2	2–2	1–0	0–1	5–1	

Source: A. Le Coq Premium liiga
Legend: Blue = home team win; Yellow = draw; Red = away team win.

== Meistriliiga play-off ==
The ninth-placed team (Kuressaare) will face the second-placed team of the 2026 Esiliiga (Viimsi) in a two-legged play-off for the final place in the 2027 Meistriliiga.

=== First leg ===
22 November 2026	Viimsi	0–2	Kuressaare	Haabneeme
10:30 BST			Švedovski 45+1'; Visse 82'	Stadium: Viimsi Stadium

=== Second leg ===
28 November 2026	Kuressaare	v	Viimsi	Kuressaare
10:30 BST				Stadium: Kuressaare kunstmurustaadion

== Season statistics ==
=== Top scorers ===
Rank	Player	Club	Goals
1	(Brazil) Wendell	FCI Levadia	20
2	(Estonia) Mattias Männilaan	Nõmme Kalju	15
3	(The Gambia) Bubacarr Tambedou	FCI Levadia	14
4	(Georgia (country)) Zakaria Beglarishvili	Nõmme United	12
5	(Estonia) Sander Alamaa	Flora	11
6	(Estonia) Mihkel Ainsalu	FCI Levadia	10
6	(Estonia) Henri Anier	Paide Linnameeskond	10
6	(Estonia) Karel Eerme	Harju	10
6	(Nigeria) Ahmad Gero	Narva Trans	10
6	(Estonia) Matthias Limberg	Vaprus	10
6	(Estonia) Maksimilian Skvortsov	FCI Levadia	10
6	(Estonia) Sergei Zenjov	Flora	10

=== Hat-tricks ===
Player	For	Against	Result	Date
(Estonia) Matthias Limberg	Vaprus	Tammeka	5–1 (H)	11 July 2026
(Brazil) Wendell	FCI Levadia	Nõmme United	5–0 (H)	9 August 2026

== Awards ==
=== Monthly awards ===
Month	Player of the Month		Manager of the Month	
Month	Player	Club	Manager	Club
March	(Ukraine) Danyl Mashchenko	Nõmme Kalju	(Russia) Nikita Andreev	Nõmme Kalju
April	(The Gambia) Bubacarr Tambedou	FCI Levadia	(Estonia) Vjatšeslav Zahovaiko	FCI Levadia
May	(Estonia) Sander Tovstik	Flora	(Estonia) Konstantin Vassiljev	Flora
June/July	(Georgia (country)) Zakaria Beglarishvili	Nõmme United	(Poland) Sławomir Cisakowski	Nõmme United
August	(Finland) Oliver Kangaslahti	Tammeka	(Estonia) Karel Voolaid	Tammeka
September	(Brazil) Wendell	FCI Levadia	(Estonia) Vjatšeslav Zahovaiko	FCI Levadia
October	(Estonia) Jan Martti Vainula	Harju	(Estonia) Vjatšeslav Zahovaiko	FCI Levadia

== See also ==
- 2026 Esiliiga
- 2026 Esiliiga B
- 2025–26 Estonian Cup
- 2026–27 Estonian Cup
