= Meistriliiga (disambiguation) =

Meistriliiga is the top division men's football league in Estonia.

Meistriliiga may also refer to the following sports leagues:

- Naiste Meistriliiga, Estonian women's top division football league
- Meistriliiga (ice hockey), Estonian top division ice hockey league
- Korvpalli Meistriliiga, Estonian top division basketball league
- Meistriliiga (handball), Estonian top division handball league
- Rannajalgpalli Meistriliiga, Estonian top division beach soccer league
- Saalijalgpalli Meistriliiga, Estonian top division futsal league
