= Stanislav Goldberg =

Estonian footballer

Personal information
- Full name: Stanislav Goldberg
- Date of birth: 30 October 1992 (age 34)
- Place of birth: Tallinn, Estonia
- Height: 1.81 m (5 ft 11 1/2 in)
- Positions: Midfielder; defender

Team information
- Current team: Kohtla-Järve JK Järve

Youth career
- 2008–2010: Flora Tallinn

Senior career*
| Years | Team | Apps | (Gls) |
| 2008–2010 | Flora Tallinn II | 76 | (8) |
| 2008 | → Warrior Valga (loan) | 12 | (0) |
| 2008 | → Warrior Valga II (loan) | 2 | (0) |
| 2008–2010 | → FC Elva (loan) | 2 | (0) |
| 2011 | FC Viljandi | 19 | (2) |
| 2011 | → Warrior Valga (loan) | 1 | (0) |
| 2012 | Paide Linnameeskond | 31 | (7) |
| 2013 | SJK | 1 | (0) |
| 2013 | Kerho 07 | 20 | (3) |
| 2014 | Paide Linnameeskond | 28 | (4) |
| 2015 | Box Hill United | 7 | (1) |
| 2015 | Nõmme Kalju | 5 | (0) |
| 2015 | Nõmme Kalju II | 11 | (4) |
| 2016 | Rakvere Tarvas | 10 | (1) |
| 2016–2017 | F.C. Ashdod | 3 | (0) |
| 2018 | Rakvere Tarvas | 6 | (0) |
| 2019 | Hapoel Ashdod | 14 | (0) |
| 2019 | Legion | 11 | (1) |
| 2020– | Kohtla-Järve JK Järve | 1 | (0) |

International career
| 2008 | Estonia U-17 | 5 | (0) |
| 2009 | Estonia U-18 | 1 | (0) |
| 2009–2011 | Estonia U-19 | 11 | (1) |
| 2012–2013 | Estonia U-21 | 7 | (0) |
- * Club domestic league appearances and goals as of 20 September 2020

Stanislav Goldberg is an Estonian football player who plays as a midfielder for Estonian club Kohtla-Järve JK Järve.
