= Käit =

Käit is an Estonian surname. Notable people with the surname include:

- Kristofer Käit (born 2005), Estonian footballer
- Mattias Käit (born 1998), Estonian footballer
