= João Pedro (footballer, born 2002) =

Brazilian footballer (born 2002)

Personal information
- Full name: João Pedro de Moura Siembarski
- Date of birth: 8 February 2002 (age 24)
- Place of birth: São Miguel Arcanjo, Brazil
- Height: 1.68 m (5 ft 6 in)
- Position: Midfielder

Team information
- Current team: FCI Levadia
- Number: 36

Youth career
- 2016–2021: Athletico Paranaense

Senior career*
| Years | Team | Apps | (Gls) |
| 2021–2023 | Athletico Paranaense | 9 | (0) |
| 2022 | → Pafos FC (loan) | 0 | (0) |
| 2023– | FCI Levadia | 100 | (26) |
- * Club domestic league appearances and goals as of 17 November 2026

João Pedro de Moura Siembarski (born 8 February 2002), known as João Pedro, is a Brazilian professional footballer who plays as a midfielder for Meistriliiga club FCI Levadia.

== Career ==
Born in São Miguel Arcanjo, São Paulo, João Pedro was an Athletico Paranaense youth graduate. He made his first team debut on 1 September 2021, coming on as a second-half substitute for Fernando Canesin in a 1–1 Campeonato Paranaense home draw against FC Cascavel.

On 9 July 2023, João Pedro was transferred to FCI Levadia in Estonia. On 10 November 2026, Levadia announced that João Pedro is leaving the club after three and a half years.

== Career statistics ==
As of 17 November 2026

Appearances and goals by club, season and competition
| Club | Season | League | | | State league | | Cup | | Continental | | Other (Note: Includes Estonian Supercup) | | Total | |
| Club | Season | Division | Apps | Goals | Apps | Goals | Apps | Goals | Apps | Goals | Apps | Goals | Apps | Goals |
|---|---|---|---|---|---|---|---|---|---|---|---|---|---|---|
| Athletico Paranaense | 2021 | Série A | 0 | 0 | 1 | 0 | 0 | 0 | 0 | 0 | — | | 1 | 0 |
| Athletico Paranaense | 2022 | Série A | 0 | 0 | 8 | 0 | 0 | 0 | 0 | 0 | 0 | 0 | 8 | 0 |
| Athletico Paranaense | Total | | 0 | 0 | 9 | 0 | 0 | 0 | 0 | 0 | 0 | 0 | 9 | 0 |
| FCI Levadia | 2023 | Meistriliiga | 16 | 3 | — | | 4 | 2 | 1 (Note: Appearances in UEFA Conference League) | 0 | — | | 21 | 5 |
| FCI Levadia | 2024 | Meistriliiga | 28 | 7 | — | | 1 | 1 | 4 | 0 | 0 | 0 | 33 | 8 |
| FCI Levadia | 2025 | Meistriliiga | 28 | 9 | — | | 0 | 0 | 6 (Note: Two appearances in UEFA Champions League, four appearances in UEFA Conference League) | 0 | 1 | 0 | 35 | 9 |
| FCI Levadia | 2026 | Meistriliiga | 28 | 7 | — | | 2 | 1 | 4 | 2 | 0 | 0 | 34 | 10 |
| FCI Levadia | Total | | 100 | 26 | — | | 7 | 4 | 15 | 2 | 1 | 0 | 123 | 32 |
| Career total | | | 100 | 26 | 9 | 0 | 7 | 4 | 15 | 2 | 1 | 0 | 132 | 32 |

== Honours ==
Athletico Paranaense

- Copa Sudamericana: 2021
