= Karl Mööl =

Estonian footballer

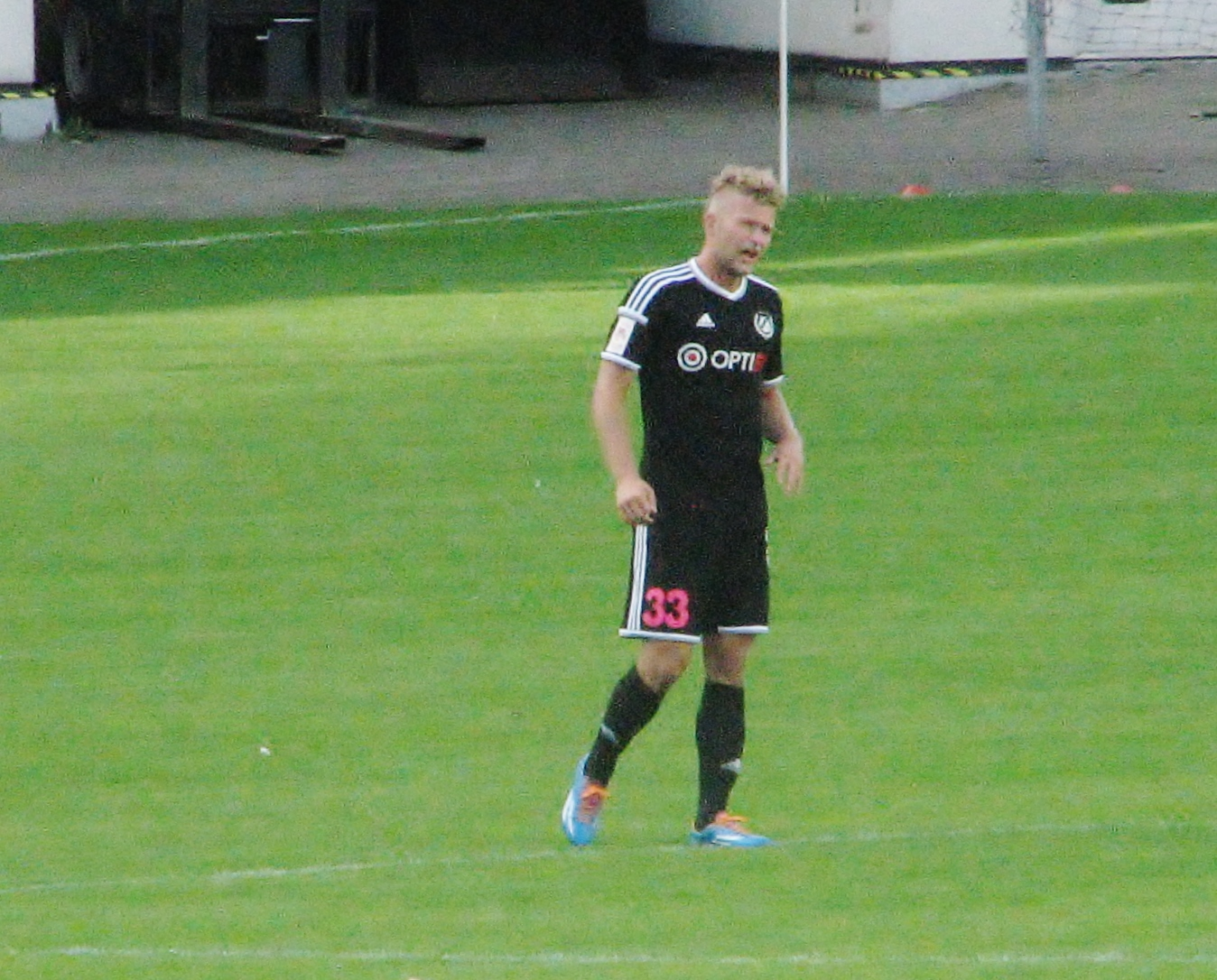
- Mööl with Nõmme Kalju in 2015

Personal information
- Full name: Karl Mööl
- Date of birth: 4 March 1992 (age 34)
- Place of birth: Tallinn, Estonia
- Height: 1.80 m (5 ft 11 in)
- Position: Right back

Team information
- Current team: Paide Linnameeskond
- Number: 33

Youth career
- 2002–2008: Kotkad
- 2008–2010: Flora

Senior career*
Years	Team	Apps	(Gls)
2008	Kotkad	10	(5)
2008–2012	Flora II	72	(5)
2009–2013	Flora	38	(7)
2010–2011	→ Warrior (loan)	15	(4)
2010	→ Tulevik (loan)	7	(0)
2011	→ Viljandi (loan)	33	(6)
2013	→ Kuressaare (loan)	18	(4)
2014–2017	Nõmme Kalju	132	(16)
2018	HB Køge	10	(0)
2018	Tallinna Kalev	18	(2)
2019–2024	Paide Linnameeskond	162	(14)
2021	→ Kuressaare (loan)	11	(0)

International career^{‡}
2007	Estonia U16	2	(0)
2008	Estonia U17	10	(1)
2009	Estonia U18	2	(0)
2009–2011	Estonia U19	14	(1)
2012–2014	Estonia U21	17	(0)
2012–2016	Estonia U23	5	(1)
2012–2018	Estonia	10	(0)
- * Club domestic league appearances and goals as of 30 July 2024 ‡ National team caps and goals as of 18 December 2019

Karl Mööl (born 4 March 1992) is an Estonian football coach and former professional footballer who played as a right back and defensive midfielder.

== Club career ==
=== Flora ===
Mööl first played for a local club Kotkad, and joined the Flora youth academy in 2008. He made his debut in the Meistriliiga on 11 July 2009, in a 2–1 home victory over Tammeka. In July 2010, Mööl moved to Tulevik on loan until the end of the 2010 season. In 2011, he joined Viljandi on a season-long loan. Mööl scored his first Meistriliiga goal on 4 June 2011, in a 2–0 away victory over Kuressaare.

Mööl scored his first goal for Flora on 6 March 2012, in an Estonian Supercup match against Narva Trans, winning the game 4–0. On 18 May 2013, he won the Estonian Cup.

On 28 June 2013, Mööl joined Kuressaare on loan until the end of the season.

=== Nõmme Kalju ===
On 24 February 2014, Mööl signed a three-year contract with Meistriliiga club Nõmme Kalju. 30 May 2015, he won his second Estonian Cup as Nõmme Kalju beat Paide Linnameeskond 2–0 in the final.

=== HB Køge ===
On 22 February 2018, Mööl signed for Danish club HB Køge.

=== Tallinna Kalev ===
On 2 July 2018, Mööl joined Meistriliiga club Tallinna Kalev.

=== Paide Linnameeskond ===
On 5 December 2018, Mööl signed a two-year contract with Paide Linnameeskond.

He retired from professional football midway through the 2024 season and joined the coaching staff of FC Flora's academy.

== International career ==
Mööl began his international career for Estonia with the national under-16 team in 2007, and went on to represent the under-17, under-18, under-19, under-21, and under-23 national sides.

On 1 November 2012, Mööl was named by manager Tarmo Rüütli in the Estonia squad to face Oman in a friendly on 8 November 2012, and made his senior international debut in the 2–1 away victory.

== Honours ==
=== Club ===
Flora

- Estonian Cup: 2012–13
- Estonian Supercup: 2012

Nõmme Kalju

- Estonian Cup: 2014–15

=== Individual ===
- Meistriliiga Team of the season: 2020
