= Vjatšeslav Zahovaiko =

Estonian footballer and coach

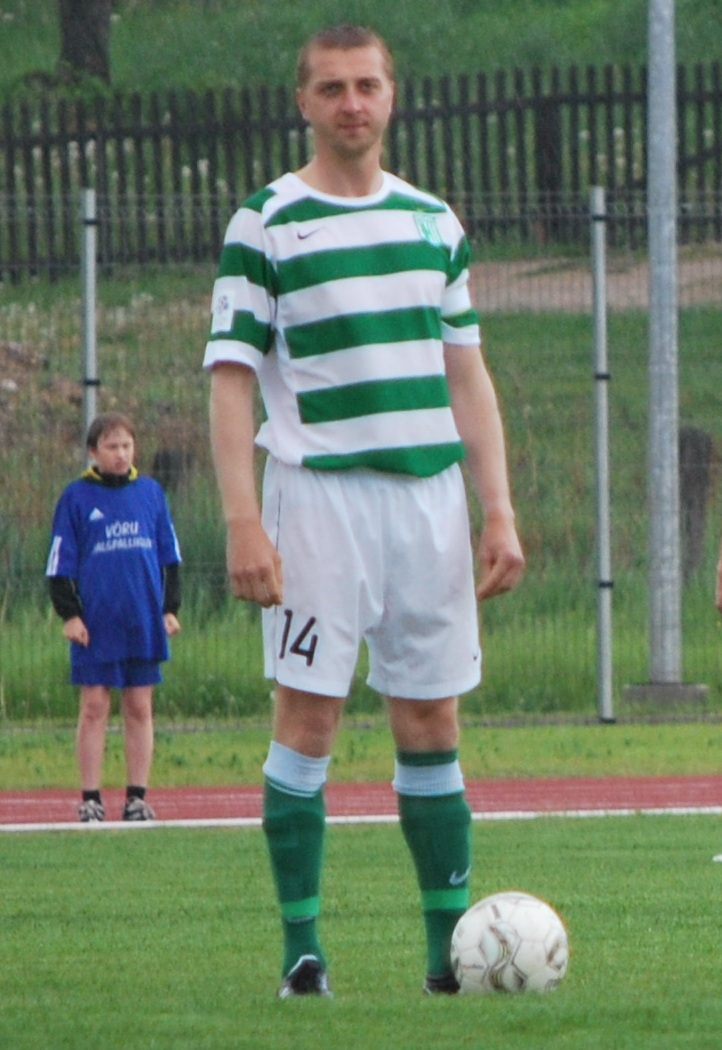
- Zahovaiko with Flora in 2009

Personal information
- Full name: Vjatšeslav Zahovaiko
- Date of birth: 29 December 1981 (age 44)
- Place of birth: Lelle, Estonia
- Height: 1.87 m (6 ft 2 in)

Team information
- Current team: Levadia (manager)

Youth career
- Lelle
- Flora Kehtna

Senior career*
| Years | Team | Apps | (Gls) |
| 1995–1996 | Lelle SK | 2 | (1) |
| 1997–1998 | Riigikogu SK | 1 | (2) |
| 1998–1999 | Flora Kehtna | 19 | (9) |
| 1999–2009 | Flora | 140 | (121) |
| 2000 | → Warrior Valga (loan) | 23 | (4) |
| 2000 | → Lelle | 5 | (1) |
| 2001–2002 | → Tulevik (loan) | 46 | (26) |
| 2001–2002 | → Elva | 12 | (5) |
| 2003 | → Pärnu Tervis | 2 | (4) |
| 2006–2007 | → Flora II | 6 | (3) |
| 2007 | → Al Kuwait Kaifan (loan) | 0 | (0) |
| 2010–2011 | U.D. Leiria | 13 | (0) |
| 2011–2012 | Debreceni VSC | 2 | (0) |
| 2011–2012 | → Debreceni VSC II | 4 | (2) |
| 2012 | KuPS | 6 | (1) |
| 2012–2014 | Sillamäe Kalev | 36 | (20) |
| 2015–2016 | Paide Linnameeskond | 53 | (36) |

International career
| | Estonia U16 | 2 | (0) |
| | Estonia U17 | 5 | (0) |
| | Estonia U19 | 2 | (0) |
| 2000–2003 | Estonia U21 | 15 | (2) |
| 2003–2011 | Estonia | 39 | (8) |

Managerial career
- 2017–2021: Paide Linnameeskond
- 2022–2023: Real de Banjul
- 2024–2025: Levadia U17
- 2026–: Levadia
- * Club domestic league appearances and goals

Vjatšeslav Zahovaiko (born 29 December 1981) is an Estonian professional football manager and former player who currently manages Meistriliiga club Levadia. Zahovaiko played for several professional clubs and was also a member of the Estonia national team.

== Playing career ==
=== FC Flora Tallinn ===
In 2006, he was the world's most effective top division goal scorer with 1.2 goals per game. At the start of 2007, he was loaned out to Al Kuwait Kaifan, but after featuring in just a few friendly games for the Kuwaiti side he was told that his contract was invalid and he was sent back to Estonia. Both his club and his agent sent a complaint to FIFA.

=== U.D. Leiria ===
On 30 December 2009, he signed a two-and-a-half-year contract with Portuguese team U.D. Leiria. In the process, he became the first Estonian to play in the top division of Portugal. In the first season he played in 6 league games and one cup game, but failed to score in these.

=== Kuopion Palloseura ===
In April 2012 Zahovaiko joined Finnish Veikkausliiga club Kuopion Palloseura.

== International career ==
He has played a total of 39 games for Estonia national team, scoring eight goals. His first international goal was against Ecuador in a friendly game. He scored his eighth goal against Uruguay in a 2–0 win game.

== Coaching career ==
Zahovaiko was named as the head coach of Meistriliiga club Paide Linnameeskond after retiring as a player for them in 2016. He led the club's transition to fully professional football club and earned Paide Linnameeskond their first league medals by finishing the 2020 season in 2nd place.

He was hired as head coach by Gambian club Real de Banjul in 2022 and led the club to lift the 2022–23 Gambian top division title. In the same year, Gambian sports journalists elected Zahovaiko as the coach of the year.

== Career statistics ==
=== Club ===
As of 27 October 2011

| Season | League level | Country | Club | First team | | Reserve team | |
| Season | League level | Country | Club | Games | Goals | Games | Goals |
|---|---|---|---|---|---|---|---|
| 1995–96 | 4 | Estonia | Lelle SK | 2 | 1 | 0 | 0 |
| 1997–98 | 4 | Estonia | Riigikogu SK | 1 | 2 | 0 | 0 |
| 1998 | 4 | Estonia | FC Flora Kehtna | 9 | 4 | 0 | 0 |
| 1999 | 3 | Estonia | FC Flora Kehtna | 10 | 5 | 0 | 0 |
| 1999 | 1 | Estonia | FC Flora Tallinn | 3 | 2 | 0 | 0 |
| 2000 | 1 | Estonia | FC Warrior Valga | 23 | 4 | 5 | 1 |
| 2001 | 1 | Estonia | JK Tulevik Viljandi | 21 | 6 | 7 | 2 |
| 2002 | 1 | Estonia | JK Tulevik Viljandi | 25 | 20 | 5 | 3 |
| 2003 | 1 | Estonia | FC Flora Tallinn | 27 | 14 | 2 | 4 |
| 2004 | 1 | Estonia | FC Flora Tallinn | 22 | 28 | 0 | 0 |
| 2005 | 1 | Estonia | FC Flora Tallinn | 15 | 19 | 0 | 0 |
| 2006 | 1 | Estonia | FC Flora Tallinn | 21 | 25 | 5 | 3 |
| 2006–07 | 1 | Kuwait | Al Kuwait Kaifan | 0 | 0 | — | — |
| 2007 | 1 | Estonia | FC Flora Tallinn | 17 | 14 | 1 | 0 |
| 2008 | 1 | Estonia | FC Flora Tallinn | 12 | 6 | 0 | 0 |
| 2009 | 1 | Estonia | FC Flora Tallinn | 23 | 13 | 0 | 0 |
| 2009–10 | 1 | Portugal | U.D. Leiria | 6 | 0 | — | — |
| 2010–11 | 1 | Portugal | U.D. Leiria | 6 | 0 | — | — |
| 2011–12 | 1 | Hungary | Debreceni VSC | 2 | 0 | 2 | 1 |

=== International ===
Scores and results list Estonia's goal tally first, score column indicates score after each Zahovaiko goal.

List of international goals scored by Vjatšeslav Zahovaiko
| No. | Date | Venue | Opponent | Score | Result | Competition |
|---|---|---|---|---|---|---|
| 1 | 13 February 2003 | Estadio Olímpico Atahualpa, Quito, Ecuador | Ecuador | 1–2 | 1–2 | Friendly |
| 2 | 17 December 2003 | Prince Mohamed bin Fahd Stadium, Dammam, Saudi Arabia | Saudi Arabia | 1–1 | 1–1 | Friendly |
| 3 | 16 February 2004 | Ta' Qali National Stadium, La Valletta, Malta | Malta | 1–1 | 2–5 | 2004 Malta Tournament |
| 4 | 11 June 2004 | A.Le Coq Arena, Tallinn, Estonia | Macedonia | 1–3 | 2–4 | Friendly |
| 5 | 26 March 2008 | A.Le Coq Arena, Tallinn, Estonia | Canada | 2–0 | 2–0 | Friendly |
| 6 | 4 June 2008 | A.Le Coq Arena, Tallinn, Estonia | Faroe Islands | 1–0 | 4–3 | Friendly |
| 7 | 4 June 2008 | A.Le Coq Arena, Tallinn, Estonia | Faroe Islands | 2–0 | 4–3 | Friendly |
| 8 | 25 March 2011 | A.Le Coq Arena, Tallinn | Uruguay | 2–0 | 2–0 | Friendly |

== Honours ==
=== Player ===
Individual

- Meistriliiga top goalscorer]]: 2004
- Estonian Silverball: 2008
- Meistriliiga Player of the Month: April 2015, September 2016
- Meistriliiga Manager of the Month: July 2019, August 2020, March/April 2021, October 2021,

=== Manager ===
Real de Banjul

- GFF League First Division: 2022–23

Levadia

- Meistriliiga: 2026
