= Elysée (footballer) =

Ivorian footballer (born 1989)

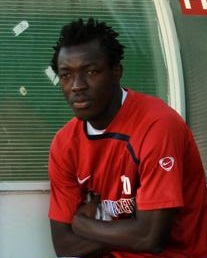

Personal information
- Full name: Irié Bi Séhi Elysée
- Date of birth: September 13, 1989 (age 37)
- Place of birth: Abidjan, Ivory Coast
- Height: 1.84 m (6 ft 1/2 in)
- Position: Defensive midfielder

Team information
- Current team: Narva Trans
- Number: 19

Senior career*
Years	Team	Apps	(Gls)
2009	ES Bingerville		
2010	Mordovia Saransk	22	(0)
2012–	Narva Trans	334	(17)

International career
2009	Ivory Coast	1	(0)
- * Club domestic league appearances and goals as of 17 November 2025

Irié Bi Séhi Elysée (born 13 September 1989), commonly known as Elise or Irié, is an Ivorian professional footballer who plays as a defensive midfielder for Meistriliiga club JK Narva Trans.

== Career ==
=== Club ===
==== Mordovia Saransk ====
Elysée made his debut for Mordovia Saransk on 30 March 2010, as a substitute against Irtysh.

==== JK Narva Trans ====
Elysée's debut for JK Narva Trans came on 8 May 2012, in the 2–1 Estonian Cup win against Paide. He made his league debut later on 2 June 2012 against JK Tammeka Tartu, where he also scored his first goal for the club in a 2–0 win.

=== International career ===
Elysée played for the Ivory Coast national football team at the 2009 African Championship of Nations.

== Career statistics ==
=== Club ===
As of match played 2 November 2025

Appearances and goals by club, season and competition
Club	Season	League			National Cup		Continental		Other		Total	
Club	Season	Division	Apps	Goals	Apps	Goals	Apps	Goals	Apps	Goals	Apps	Goals
Mordovia Saransk	2010	Russian First Division	22	0	1	0	–		–		23	0
Narva Trans	2012	Meistriliiga	30	1	3	0	0	0	-		33	1
Narva Trans	2013	Meistriliiga	26	4	2	0	2	0	-		30	4
Narva Trans	2014	Meistriliiga	14	0	0	0	-		-		14	0
Narva Trans	2015	Meistriliiga	2	0	0	0	-		-		2	0
Narva Trans	2016	Meistriliiga	9	1	0	0	-		-		9	1
Narva Trans	2017	Meistriliiga	30	5	0	0	-		-		30	5
Narva Trans	2018	Meistriliiga	25	1	1	0	2	0	-		28	1
Narva Trans	2019	Meistriliiga	30	1	4	0	2	0	1	0	37	1
Narva Trans	2020	Meistriliiga	25	1	4	0	-		-		29	1
Narva Trans	2021	Meistriliiga	27	2	1	0	-		-		28	2
Narva Trans	2022	Meistriliiga	32	0	2	0	-		-		28	2
Narva Trans	2023	Meistriliiga	26	0	4	0	2	0	-		28	2
Narva Trans	2024	Meistriliiga	28	1	1	0	-		-		28	2
Narva Trans	2025	Meistriliiga	29	0	2	0	-		-		28	2
Narva Trans	Total		333	17	24	0	8	0	1	0	366	17
Career total			355	17	25	0	8	0	1	0	389	17
