= Edgar Tur =

Estonian footballer (born 1996)

Personal information
- Date of birth: 28 December 1996 (age 29)
- Place of birth: Tallinn, Estonia
- Height: 1.83 m (6 ft 0 in)
- Position: Right-back

Team information
- Current team: Paide Linnameeskond
- Number: 7

Senior career*
| Years | Team | Apps | (Gls) |
| 2014–2016 | FCI Tallinn | 1 | (0) |
| 2016 | FCI Tallinn II | 24 | (13) |
| 2017–2022 | Paide Linnameeskond | 136 | (14) |
| 2019 | → Botev Vratsa (loan) | 8 | (0) |
| 2023–2025 | Levadia | 83 | (3) |
| 2026– | Paide Linnameeskond | 15 | (0) |

International career^{‡}
| 2017–2018 | Estonia U21 | 5 | (0) |
| 2020– | Estonia | 7 | (1) |
- * Club domestic league appearances and goals as of 17 November 2026 ‡ National team caps and goals as of 2 December 2025

Edgar Tur (born 28 December 1996) is an Estonian professional footballer who plays as a right-back for Paide Linnameeskond.

== International career ==
Tur represented Estonia at U21 level.

He made his national team debut on 7 October 2020 in a friendly against Lithuania.

== Career statistics ==
| No. | Date | Venue | Opponent | Score | Result | Competition |
|---|---|---|---|---|---|---|
| 1. | 8 June 2024 | A. Le Coq Arena, Tallinn, Estonia | Faroe Islands | 3–1 | 4–1 | 2024 Baltic Cup Semi-final |
