= Karel Voolaid =

Estonian footballer and manager

Personal information
- Date of birth: 4 July 1977 (age 49)
- Place of birth: Koeru, Estonia
- Height: 1.74 m (5 ft 9 in)
- Position: Midfielder

Senior career*
Years	Team	Apps	(Gls)
1998	Flora Kehtna	10	(9)
1999	Atli II	12	(8)
2000–2006	Koeru	56	(42)
2007	Operi Jalgpallikool	15	(17)
2008–2009	Paide Linnameeskond	43	(10)
2010–2011	Koeru	27	(19)
2012–2013	Paide Linnameeskond	46	(1)
Total		209	(106)

Managerial career
- 2002: Estonia U15 (assistant)
- 2003: Valga (assistant)
- 2003: Estonia U17
- 2004–2005: Tervis Pärnu
- 2005: Estonia U19
- 2006–2008: Flora (assistant)
- 2006: Estonia U21 (assistant)
- 2009: TPS (assistant)
- 2010: Nõmme Kalju (assistant)
- 2010: Nõmme Kalju
- 2012–2013: Estonia U19
- 2012: Estonia U15 (assistant)
- 2013: Estonia U16
- 2014–2016: Estonia U15
- 2015: Estonia U16
- 2017–2019: Estonia U21
- 2019: Estonia U23
- 2019–2020: Estonia
- 2022–2023: Paide Linnameeskond
- * Club domestic league appearances and goals

Karel Voolaid (born 4 July 1977) is an Estonian football manager and former player.

== Managerial career ==
=== Estonia youth teams ===
Voolaid has managed Estonia's under-15s, under-16s, under-19s, under-21s and under-23s.

=== Estonia ===
On 3 July 2019, the Estonian Football Association appointed Voolaid as manager of the Estonia national team until the end of the qualifying tournament for the UEFA Euro 2020.

== Managerial statistics ==
As of match played 18 November 2020

Managerial record by team and tenure
Team	From	To	Record				
Team	From	To	P	W	D	L	Win %
Estonia	3 July 2019	31 December 2020	14	0	4	10	0.0

== Honours ==
Individual

- Meistriliiga Manager of the Month: September 2022
