= Maksimilian Skvortsov =

Estonian footballer (born 2007)

Personal information
- Full name: Maksimilian Skvortsov
- Date of birth: 20 December 2007 (age 18)
- Place of birth: Tallinn, Estonia
- Height: 5 ft 10 in (1.78 m)
- Positions: Attacking midfielder; winger

Team information
- Current team: FCI Levadia
- Number: 21

Youth career
- 2014: Ajax
- 2015–2017: FCI Tallinn
- 2018–2024: FCI Levadia

Senior career*
Years	Team	Apps	(Gls)
2023	FCI Levadia U19	1	(1)
2023–2025	FCI Levadia U21	71	(21)
2024–	FCI Levadia	61	(12)

International career^{‡}
2022	Estonia U16	1	(0)
2023	Estonia U17	11	(0)
2024–2025	Estonia U19	16	(2)
2026–	Estonia U21	2	(0)
2026–	Estonia	1	(0)
- * Club domestic league appearances and goals as of 17 November 2026 ‡ National team caps and goals as of 7 October 2026

Maksimilian Skvortsov (born 20 December 2007) is a professional footballer who plays as an attacking midfielder or winger for Meistriliiga club FCI Levadia and the Estonia national team.

== Club career ==
=== FCI Levadia ===
Skvortsov made his debut for FCI Levadia on 24 November 2023 in a 2023–24 Estonian Cup tie against Tammeka, coming on as a late substitute and scoring the final goal in a 4–2 win.

== International career ==
Skvortsov has competed for the Estonia under-16s, under-17s, under-19s and under-21s.

On 15 September 2026, Skvortsov was called up to the Estonia senior team for the first time for upcoming UEFA Nations League fixtures against Iceland, Bulgaria and Luxembourg. On 6 October 2026, he made his debut during a 0–0 draw against Iceland.

== Honours ==
FCI Levadia

- Meistriliiga: 2024
- Estonian Cup: 2023–24
