= 2026–27 Estonian Cup =

Estonian football competition

Tournament details
- Country: Estonia
- Teams: 71

The 2026–27 Estonian Cup is the 37th season of the main domestic football knockout tournament in Estonia. The winners qualify for the 2027–28 UEFA Conference League first qualifying round. Flora were the defending cup holders.

== First round ==
22 clubs entered the first round. The draw was held on 19 May 2026, alongside the Round of 64 draw.

Team 1	Score	Team 2
10 June 2026
Rakvere Freedom	2–2 (5–4 p)	Kena
Saue	6–0	Viimsi Lovid
Narva Trans	10–0	Vana Hea Puur
Jõhvi Phoenix	4–2	Elva III
Tartu Kalev	4–3 (a.e.t.)	Paide Linnameeskond III
Arsenal ja Põhja-Tallinna	0–3	Tallinna Kalev U21
16 June 2026
Kose	8–0	Kummik
18 June 2026
Tartu Team Helm	30–0	Deliirium
30 June 2026
Järva-Jaani	0–4	Elva
2 July 2026
Tallinna Wolves	0–10	Tabasalu
10 July 2026
Lähte United	1–3	Tabasalu Ulasabat

== Round of 64 ==
45 clubs entered the Round of 64 alongside the 11 first round winners; the top four teams of the 2025 Meistriliiga (Flora, FCI Levadia, Nõmme Kalju, and Paide Linnameeskond) received byes. The draw was held on 19 May 2026, alongside the first round draw.

Team 1	Score	Team 2
21 July 2026
Märjamaa Kompanii	8–4 (a.e.t.)	Generation
Tabasalu Ulasabat	1–4	Vaprus
Kristiine	8–3	Jõgeva Wolves
22 July 2026
Hiiumaa	4–1	Tulevik
Tabasalu	0–2	Tallinna Tamper
Jõhvi Phoenix	8–1	Tallinna Hell Hunt
Narva Trans	0–0 (4–3 p)	Flora U21
Läänemaa	0–6	Elva
TalTech	0–6	Keila
Aruküla Vigri	0–1 (a.e.t.)	Raasiku Joker
23 July 2026
Viimsi	4–0	Nõmme United U19
Tartu Helios	3–0 w/o	Tallinna Soccernet
Pärnu Poseidon	2–2 (5–3 p)	Tartu Team Helm
Tartu Kalev	7–0	Kuusalu Kalev
Tallinna Kalev U21	4–2	Rakvere Freedom
Harju	8–0	Rae Spordikool
Kuressaare	5–1	Tartu Welco X
Tammeka U19	0–8	Tallinna Kalev
Rumori Calcio Tallinn II	0–12	Tartu Welco
Nõmme United	12–0	Raplamaa
24 July 2026
Tammeka	19–0	Tallinna Zealot Sporting
25 July 2026
Tallinna EstHam United	1–5	Kose
Kohvile	1–4 (a.e.t.)	Rumori Calcio Tallinn
26 July 2026
Saku Sporting	2–1	Legion
Tallinna Wise	3–6	Tallinna Olympic
28 July 2026
Tallinn	4–1	Tallinna Zapoos
29 July 2026
Flora U19	6–3	Eston Villa ja Põhja-Tallinna
5 August 2026
Saue	1–2	Harju U21

== Round of 32 ==
The 28 Round of 64 winners and 4 teams given byes entered the Round of 32. The draw was held on 24 July 2026

Team 1	Score	Team 2
5 August 2026
Rumori Calcio Tallinn	0–1	Tammeka
11 August 2026
Harju	3–1	Tallinna Tamper
Tallinna Kalev	8–0	Tartu Kalev
Pärnu Poseidon	0–12	Nõmme Kalju
Narva Trans	8–0	Märjamaa Kompanii
Kristiine	0–8	Kuressaare
12 August 2026
Tartu Helios	1–4	Viimsi
Elva	wo	Raasiku Joker
Jõhvi Phoenix	0–5	Vaprus
Kose	0–8	Tartu Welco
19 August 2026
Keila	2–2 (5–4 p)	Flora U19
Tallinna Olympic	0–7	Saku Sporting
Hiiumaa	0–2	Nõmme United
26 August 2026
FCI Levadia	4–1	Paide Linnameeskond
22 September 2026
Tallinn	5–0	Harju U21
29 October 2026
Flora	10–1	Tallinna Kalev U21

== Round of 16 ==
The 16 Round of 32 winners entered the Round of 16. The draw was held on 17 August 2026

Team 1	Score	Team 2
26 August 2026
Narva Trans	2–0	Nõmme Kalju
2 September 2026
Nõmme United	3–2	Vaprus
24 September 2026
Elva	3–2	Tallinna Kalev
2 October 2026
Tammeka	4–1	Viimsi
3 October 2026
Kuressaare	4–2	Saku Sporting
Tallinn	0–10	Harju
7 October 2026
FCI Levadia	10–0	Keila
4 November 2026
Flora	7–2	Tartu Welco
