= Kristofer Käit =

Estonian footballer (born 2005)

Personal information
- Date of birth: 4 April 2005 (age 21)
- Place of birth: Tallinn, Estonia
- Height: 1.90 m (6 ft 3 in)
- Positions: Defender; midfielder

Team information
- Current team: Paide Linnameeskond
- Number: 44

Youth career
- 2011–2017: Loo
- 2018–2021: Tallinna Kalev
- 2022: → Porto (loan)
- 2022–2024: → Rio Ave (loan)
- 2025–2026: Portimonense

Senior career*
| Years | Team | Apps | (Gls) |
| 2020–2021 | Tallinna Kalev U21 | 15 | (0) |
| 2021–2024 | Tallinna Kalev | 20 | (0) |
| 2025–2026 | Portimonense | 0 | (0) |
| 2026– | Paide Linnameeskond | 7 | (1) |

International career^{‡}
| 2019 | Estonia U15 | 3 | (0) |
| 2021–2022 | Estonia U17 | 6 | (0) |
| 2022 | Estonia U18 | 3 | (0) |
| 2022–2023 | Estonia U19 | 11 | (0) |
| 2025 | Estonia U21 | 6 | (0) |
| 2026– | Estonia | 1 | (0) |
- * Club domestic league appearances and goals as of 17 November 2026 ‡ National team caps and goals as of 3 August 2026

Kristofer Käit (born 4 April 2005) is an Estonian professional footballer who plays as a defender for Meistriliiga club Paide Linnameeskond and the Estonia national team.

== Early life ==
Käit was born on 4 April 2005. Born in Tallinn, Estonia, he is the younger brother of Estonia international Mattias Käit.

== Club career ==
As a youth player, Käit joined the youth academy of Estonian side Tallinna Kalev and was promoted to the club's senior team in 2021, where he made twenty league appearances and scored zero goals.

In 2022, he was sent on loan to the youth academy of Portuguese side Porto. The same year, he was sent on loan to Portuguese side Rio Ave. Following his stint there, he signed for Portuguese side Portimonense in 2025, where he captained the club's under-23 team.

== International career ==
Käit is an Estonia youth international. During June, September, and October 2025 he played for the Estonia national under-21 football team for 2027 UEFA European Under-21 Championship qualification.

== Honours ==
Estonia

- Baltic Cup: 2026
