= Rannajalgpalli Meistriliiga =

Estonian beach football league

- Founded: 2007
- Country: Estonia
- Confederation: UEFA
- Number of clubs: 8
- Website: Website

Rannajalgpalli Meistriliiga is the top division in the Estonian beach soccer league.

== History ==
In 2002, some minor tournaments were held in Estonia. Since 2003, Estonian Beach Soccer Union has organized tournaments around Estonia and Estonian Championsionships are held since 2004. During 2004–2006 Estonian Championsionships were played as a one-day tournament. From 2007, the champions are determined in a season-long league system.
