= Paide kunstmuruväljak =

Football stadium in Paide, Estonia

Coordinates: 58°52′35.7″N 25°32′28″E

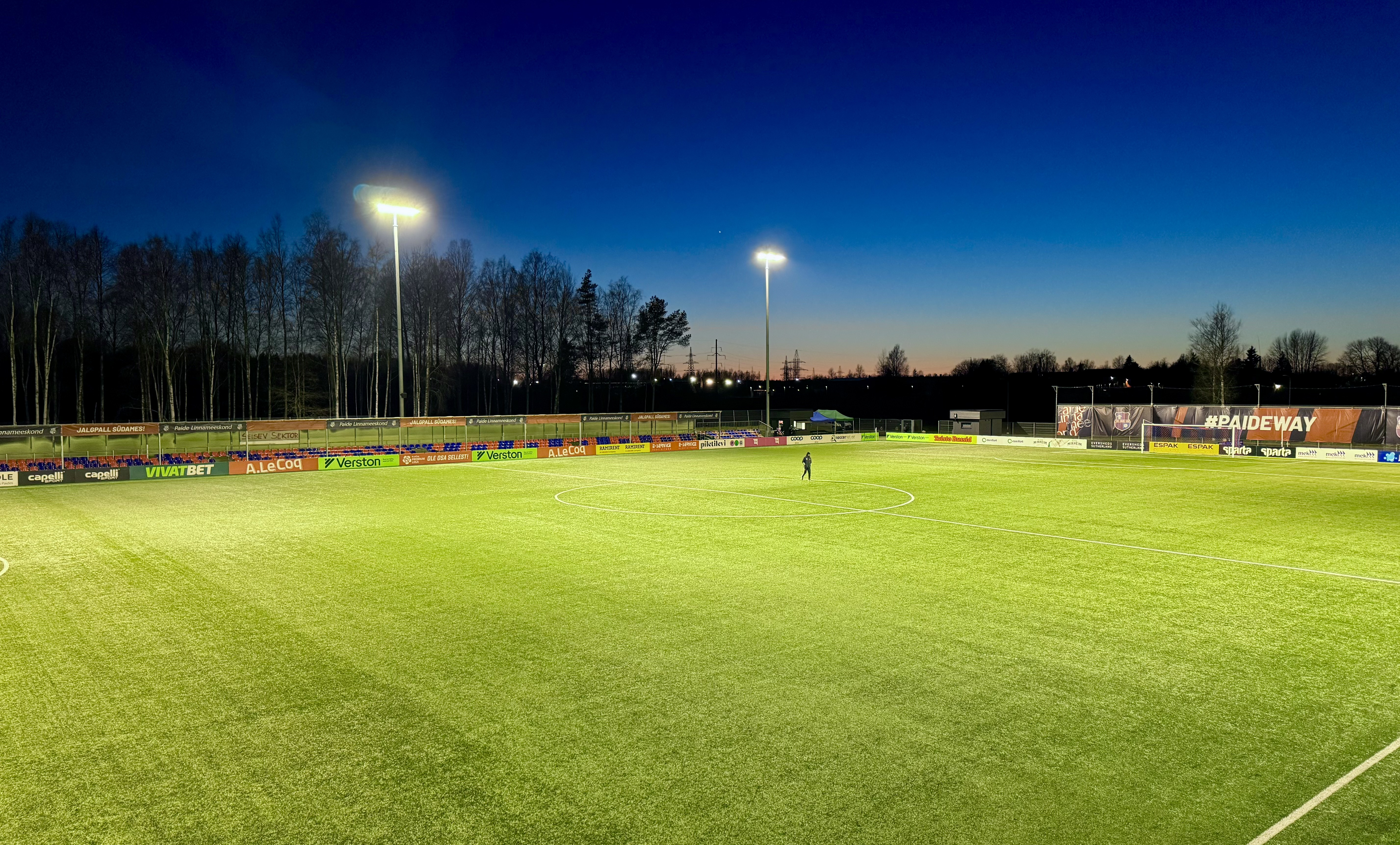
- Location: Paide, Estonia
- Owner: Town of Paide
- Operator: Paide Linnameeskond
- Capacity: 542
- Surface: Artificial turf
- Field size: 105 x 68 m

Construction
- Opened: 2009; 17 years ago
- Renovated: 2020, 2022, 2025

Tenants
- Paide Linnameeskond (2026–present) (Note: From 2009–2025, Paide Linnameeskond only used the stadium as a home ground during winter and early spring months.)

Paide kunstmuruväljak (English: Paide artificial turf ground) is a football ground in Paide, Estonia. It is the home ground of Paide Linnameeskond and has 542 seats.

From 2009 until 2025, Paide Linnameeskond only used the ground as its home venue during winter and early spring months, while Paide linnastaadion served as the club's primary home ground. Since 2026, the club has been playing all of their home games at the artificial turf ground.

== History ==
The stadium was opened in November 2009, becoming the first artificial turf ground built in Paide.

In 2020, a new artificial turf surface was installed. In 2022, a 442-seat stand with a roof was erected. In June 2025, Paide Linnameeskond opened an administrative building that serves both the artificial turf ground and the adjacent indoor football hall. The construction of the building cost €1.1 million.

In 2026, Paide Linnameeskond announced they would play all of their home matches at Paide kunstmuruväljak until the construction of their new stadium. The club cited the artificial turf ground's better infrastructure and technical conditions for players and spectators compared with the previously used Paide linnastaadion.
