= Saalijalgpalli Meistriliiga =

Estonian futsal league

- Founded: 2006
- Country: Estonia
- Confederation: UEFA
- Number of clubs: 6
- Level on pyramid: 1
- Relegation to: Esiliiga
- International cup: UEFA Futsal Champions League
- Current champions: Tallinna FC Cosmos (2025–26)
- Most championships: FC Anži Tallinn (6)
- Website: jalgpall.ee
- Current: Current Season at UEFA.com

Saalijalgpalli Meistriliiga is the premier futsal league in Estonia. It was founded in 2006. Organized by Estonian Football Association, it is played under UEFA and FIFA rules.

== Champions ==
Season	Winner	Second place
2006–07	FC Anži Tallinn	
2007–08	Tallinna FC Betoon	
2008–09	JK Sillamäe	
2009–10	FC Anži Tallinn	
2010–11	FC Anži Tallinn	
2011–12	FC Anži Tallinn	
2012–13	FC Anži Tallinn	Narva United FC
2013–14	FC Anži Tallinn	Tallinna SK Augur Enemat
2014–15	Tallinna SK Augur Enemat	Sillamäe JK Dina
2015–16	Tallinna FC Cosmos	Narva United FC
2016–17	Narva United FC	Tallinna FC Cosmos
2017–18	Tallinna FC Cosmos	Narva United FC
2018–19	Viimsi FC Smsraha	Tallinna FC Cosmos
2019–20*	Viimsi FC Smsraha	Sillamäe Alexela
2020–21	Viimsi FC Smsraha	Tartu Ravens Futsal
2021–22	Tallinna FC Cosmos	Viimsi FC Smsraha
2022–23	Tallinna FC Cosmos	Sillamäe Silla FC
2023–24	Sillamäe Silla FC	Tallinna FC Bunker Partner
2024–25	Tallinna FC Bunker Partner	Kopli Coolbet FC
2025–26	Tallinna FC Bunker Partner	Narva United FC

*Winners declared based on league table, not play-offs due to COVID-19 pandemic
