= Paide Linnameeskond =

Estonian football club

- Full name: Paide Linnameeskond
- Founded: 2004; 22 years ago
- Ground: Paide kunstmuruväljak
- Capacity: 542
- President: Veiko Veskimäe
- Manager: Tarmo Kink
- League: Meistriliiga
- 2026: Meistriliiga, 2nd of 10
- Website: www.paidelinnameeskond.ee
Home colours	Away colours

Paide Linnameeskond, or simply Paide, is an Estonian professional football club based in Paide that competes in the Meistriliiga, the top flight of Estonian football. The club's home ground is Paide kunstmuruväljak.

Founded in 2004, the club has played in the Meistriliiga since 2009 and has never been relegated. Paide Linnameeskond have won one Estonian Cup in 2021–22, and one Estonian Supercup in 2023.

== History ==
=== Early history (2004–2016) ===
Paide Linnameeskond was founded in 2004 as a satellite club of Flora. The team entered the Western division of the IV liiga and saw four consecutive promotions from 2005 to 2008, when they were promoted to the Meistriliiga. Paide Linnameeskond finished their first season in the Estonian top flight in ninth place, but escaped relegation by defeating Warrior 2–1 on aggregate in the play-offs. In July 2010, former Paide Linnameeskond player Meelis Rooba was appointed as manager and in 2013, Estonian entrepreneur Veiko Veskimäe became the club's president.

Paide reached the 2014–15 Estonian Cup final, but lost to Nõmme Kalju 0–2. Rooba resigned as manager after the 2016 season and was replaced by another former player, Vjatšeslav Zahovaiko.

=== Professionalism, Europe and first trophies (2017–present) ===
Under Zahovaiko, Paide Linnameeskond transitioned into a professional football club and established themselves as one of the top teams in the top flight, finishing 5th in 2018 and 4th in 2019, earning their first ever European place finish. Paide made their debut in Europe on 27 August 2020 against Žalgiris, losing 0–2 in the UEFA Europa League first qualifying round. The club earned their first league medals in 2020 by finishing the season in 2nd place. Zahovaiko left Paide after leading the club to third in the 2021 season, being replaced by former player and Estonian national team coach Karel Voolaid.

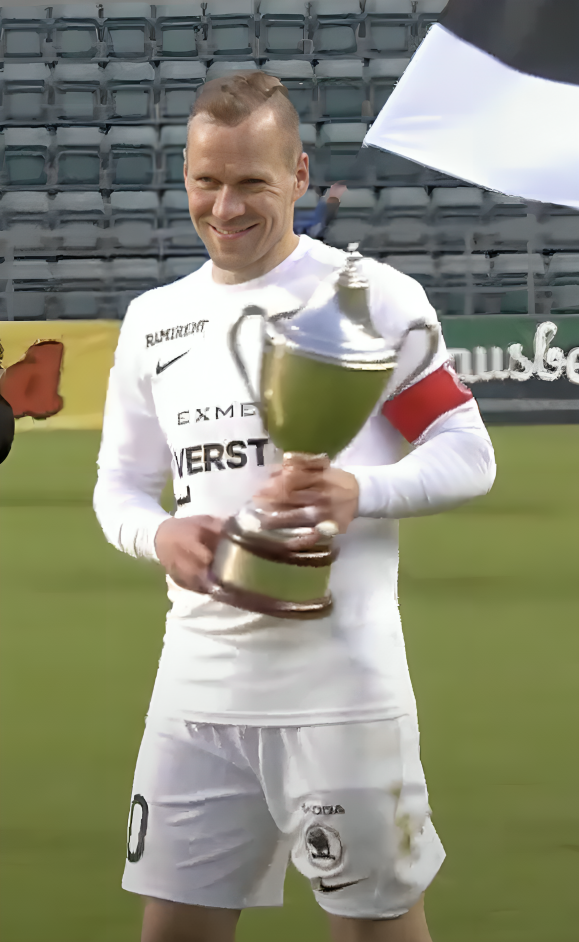
Andre Frolov lifting Paide's first-ever trophy, the 2021–22 Estonian Cup

In June 2021, Paide Linnameeskond announced its formal affiliation with the Gambian football club Real de Banjul. Throughout the cooperation between Paide Linnameeskond and Real de Banjul, multiple Gambian footballers have used Paide as a stepping stone, including Alassana Jatta, Muhammed Sanneh and Abdoulie Ceesay. In July 2021, Paide notably signed ex-Liverpool F.C. defender Ragnar Klavan from Serie A side Cagliari Calcio.

On 21 May 2022, Paide lifted their first-ever trophy after defeating Nõmme Kalju 1–0 in the Estonian Cup final, with Siim Luts scoring the winning goal in the 109th minute. The 2022–23 season saw Paide win their first European ties against FC Dinamo Tbilisi and FC Ararat-Armenia in the Europa Conference League first and second qualifying rounds, both on penalties. Paide hosted European matches at both rounds at the 1,500-capacity Pärnu Rannastaadion due to their own 500-capacity Paide linnastaadion not meeting UEFA Category 2 Stadium requirements. Their third qualifying round home debut, a 0–2 defeat to R.S.C. Anderlecht of Belgium, was played at the 14,336-capacity Lilleküla Stadium.

Paide Linnameeskond started the 2023 season by winning their first Estonian Supercup in a 3–2 victory against Flora, but after a poor start to the league season, Voolaid was sacked in May and replaced with Serbian coach Ivan Stojković. Paide reached the 2023–24 Estonian Cup final, but lost 2–4 to FCI Levadia. In January 2025, Paide Linnameeskond became the first Estonian club to sell a player directly to a 'Big Five' league, as Abdoulie Ceesay was acquired by St. Pauli of Bundesliga.

== Kit manufacturers and shirt sponsors ==
Period	Kit manufacturer	Shirt sponsor	Ref
2011–2015	Nike	Verston	
2016–2017	Nike	Enemat	
2018–2021	Nike	Verston	
2021–2023	Nike	Exmet, Verston	
2024–	Capelli Sport	Verston	

== Stadium ==
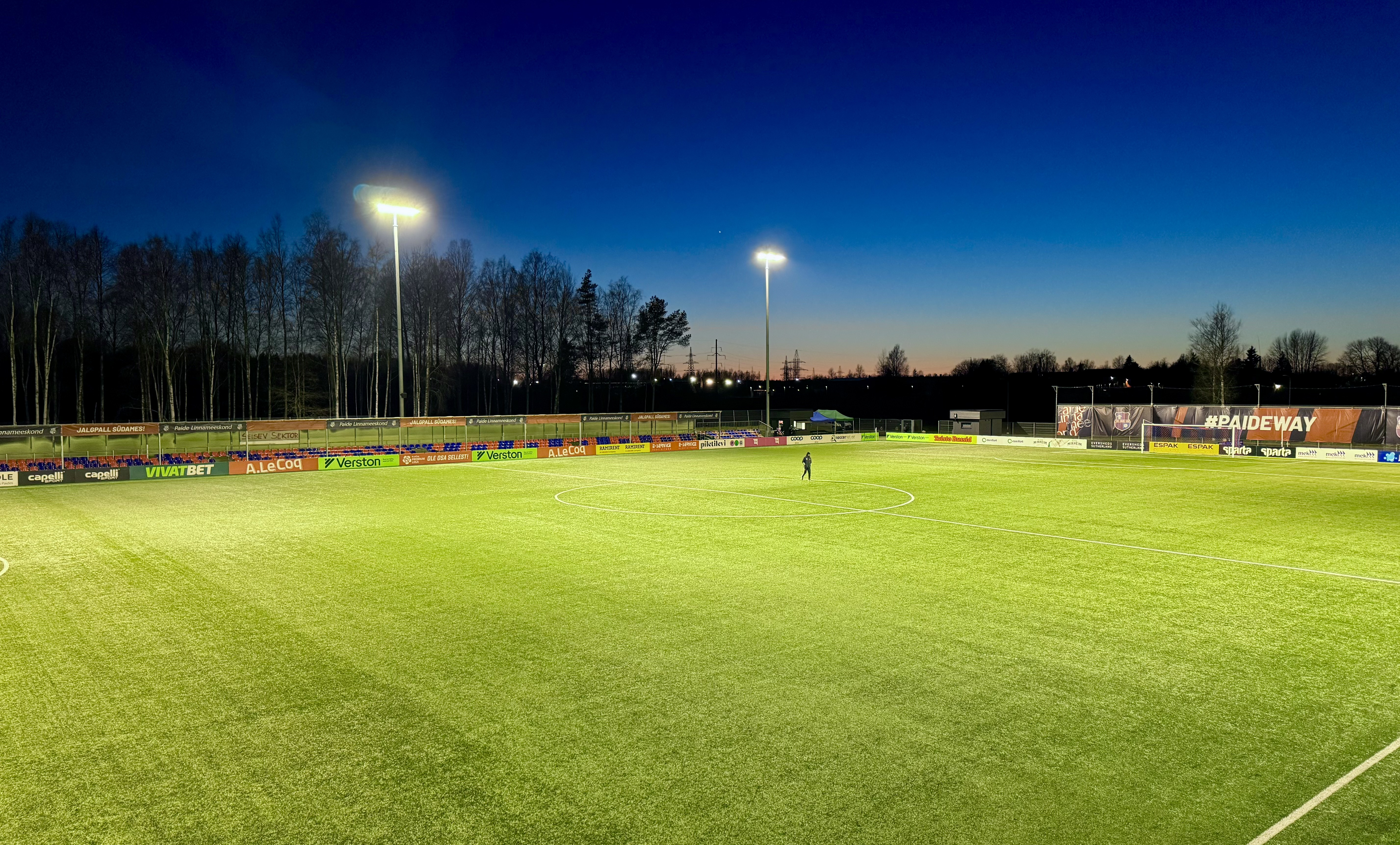
Paide kunstmuruväljak is the primary home ground of the club since 2026

Paide Linnameeskond's first home ground was the 500-seat Paide linnastaadion, which hosted the club's matches from 2004 to 2025. In 2026, Paide moved their home matches to the adjacent 542-seat artificial turf ground Paide kunstmuruväljak, which they had previously been using as a home venue during winter and early spring months.

Paide Linnameeskond expects to begin construction of the first stand of their new 4,500-seat stadium in early 2027. The first phase of the project will include a 1,200-seat stand with hostel and sports medicine facilities, at an estimated construction cost of €3.4 million. The complete project is expected to cost between €15 million and €20 million. Paide's football complex also includes an indoor football facility named Paide Jalgpallihall, which was opened in December 2024 and cost €3.5 million.

For European fixtures, Paide uses Pärnu Rannastaadion as their home ground due to their stadium not meeting UEFA Category 2 Stadium requirements. The club has also used larger venues Kadriorg Stadium and A. Le Coq Arena as their home in their European ties.

== Players ==
=== First-team squad ===
As of 8 September 2026.

Note: Flags indicate national team as defined under FIFA eligibility rules; some limited exceptions apply. Players may hold more than one non-FIFA nationality.

No.	Pos.	Nation	Player
2	DF	EST	Michael Lilander
3	DF	BRA	Victor Hugo dos Santos de Sa
4	DF	BRA	Pedro Andrade Drozina
6	MF	BRA	Daniel Cabral
7	DF	EST	Edgar Tur
8	MF	EST	Henrik Ojamaa (captain)
9	FW	EST	Henri Anier
10	MF	EST	Martin Miller
11	MF	GAM	Pa Modou Sohna
12	GK	EST	Marko Meerits
14	FW	GAM	Momodou Jobarteh

No.	Pos.	Nation	Player
17	MF	GAM	Pa Abdou Cham
19	FW	EST	Siim Luts
20	FW	EST	Kristofer Piht
23	FW	COL	Juan Sebastian Palacios Murillo
27	DF	EST	Nikita Baranov
28	MF	EST	Oskar Hõim
29	FW	GAM	Dawda Darboe
44	DF	EST	Kristofer Käit
77	FW	EST	Daniel Luts
99	GK	GAM	Ebrima Jarju

=== Out on loan ===
Note: Flags indicate national team as defined under FIFA eligibility rules; some limited exceptions apply. Players may hold more than one non-FIFA nationality.

No.	Pos.	Nation	Player
49	MF	EST	Henri Lehtmaa (at Tallinna Kalev until 31 December 2026)

== Club officials ==
=== Current technical staff ===
Position	Name
Head coach	(Estonia) Tarmo Kink
Assistant coach	(Spain) Daniel Bolufer
Video analyst	(Estonia) Carl Kalju
Data analyst	(Estonia) Risto Paju
Goalkeeping coach	(Estonia) Jüris Sahkur
Fitness coach	(Estonia) Silver Grauberg
Physiotherapists	(Estonia) Riina Riisik
Physiotherapists	(Estonia) Roger Teor
Management
President	(Estonia) Veiko Veskimäe
Chief Executive Officer	(Estonia) Jaanus Pruuli
Sporting Director	(Estonia) Gert Kams
Scout	(Estonia) Egon-Eret Rinaldo
Head of Academy	(Finland) Mika Laurikainen

=== Managerial history ===
Dates	Name
2004–2005	(Estonia) Margus Luts
2006–2009	(Estonia) Viktor Mets
2010	(Estonia) Erki Kesküla
2010–2016	(Estonia) Meelis Rooba
2017–2021	(Estonia) Vjatšeslav Zahovaiko
2022–2023	(Estonia) Karel Voolaid
2023–2025	(Serbia) Ivan Stojković
2025–2026	(Estonia) Vladimir Vassiljev
2026–	(Estonia) Tarmo Kink

== Honours ==
- Estonian Cup
  - Winners (1): 2021–22
  - Runners-up (3): 2014–15, 2023–24, 2025–26
- Estonian Supercup
  - Winners (1): 2023
  - Runners-up (1): 2021

== Seasons and statistics ==
=== Seasons ===
Season	Division	Pos	Pld	W	D	L	GF	GA	GD	Pts	Top goalscorer	Cup	Supercup
2004	IV liiga	6	18	7	4	7	41	55	−14	25	(Estonia) Ergo Eelmäe (14)		
2005	IV liiga	3	22	15	0	7	60	25	+35	45	(Estonia) Rauno Rikberg (18)		
2006	III liiga	1	22	15	4	3	100	32	+68	49	(Estonia) Rauno Rikberg (48)		
2007	II liiga	1	26	20	1	5	108	35	+73	61	(Estonia) Rauno Rikberg (34)	First round	
2008	Esiliiga	4	36	14	12	10	58	44	+14	54	(Estonia) Karel Voolaid (9)	Second round	
2009	Meistriliiga	9	36	6	4	26	21	97	−76	22	(Estonia) Meelis Rooba (5)	Third round	
2010	Meistriliiga	8	36	6	7	23	30	79	−49	25	(Estonia) Mihail Ištšuk (6)	Second round	
2011	Meistriliiga	6	36	13	6	17	40	51	−11	45	(Estonia) Tiit Tikenberg (10)	Second round	
2012	Meistriliiga	6	36	11	9	16	34	52	−18	42	(Estonia) Stanislav Goldberg (7)	Semi-finals	
2013	Meistriliiga	5	36	15	2	19	43	58	−15	47	(Estonia) Andre Mägi (Estonia) Lauri Varendi (7)	Third round	
2014	Meistriliiga	6	36	9	8	19	39	67	−28	35	(Estonia) Rasmus Tomson (8)	Fourth round	
2015	Meistriliiga	7	36	9	6	21	50	73	−23	33	(Estonia) Vjatšeslav Zahovaiko (17)	Runners-up	
2016	Meistriliiga	6	36	14	6	16	58	61	−3	48	(Estonia) Vjatšeslav Zahovaiko (19)	Third round	
2017	Meistriliiga	6	36	10	8	18	47	88	−41	38	(Estonia) Magnar Vainumäe (8)	Semi-finals	
2018	Meistriliiga	5	36	14	9	13	64	74	−10	51	(Nigeria) Samson Iyede (12)	Third round	
2019	Meistriliiga	4	36	23	5	8	78	30	+48	74	(The Gambia) Alassana Jatta (13)	Quarter-finals	
2020	Meistriliiga	2	30	21	1	8	80	43	+37	64	(Uganda) Edrisa Lubega (14)	Fourth round	
2021	Meistriliiga	3	32	18	8	6	66	35	+31	62	(Estonia) Henri Anier (26)	Fourth round	Runners-up
2022	Meistriliiga	3	36	19	8	9	84	37	+47	65	(Estonia) Robi Saarma (16)	Winners	
2023	Meistriliiga	4	36	13	14	9	50	34	+16	53	(Estonia) Siim Luts (6)	Quarter-finals	Winners
2024	Meistriliiga	3	36	23	3	10	74	39	+35	72	(Estonia) Robi Saarma (15)	Runners-up	
2025	Meistriliiga	4	36	21	7	8	63	32	+31	70	(Estonia) Robi Saarma (8)	Quarter-finals	
2026	Meistriliiga	2	36	19	7	10	56	43	+13	64	(Estonia) Henri Anier (10)	Runners-up	

=== Europe ===
Season	Competition	Round	Opponent	Home	Away	Agg.
2020–21	UEFA Europa League	First qualifying round	(Lithuania) Žalgiris	—N/a	0–2	—N/a
2021–22	UEFA Europa Conference League	First qualifying round	(Poland) Śląsk Wrocław	1–2	0–2	1–4
2022–23	UEFA Europa Conference League	First qualifying round	(Georgia (country)) Dinamo Tbilisi	1–2 (a.e.t.)	3–2	4–4 (6–5 p)
2022–23	UEFA Europa Conference League	Second qualifying round	Ararat-Armenia	0−0 (a.e.t.)	0–0	0–0 (5–3 p)
2022–23	UEFA Europa Conference League	Third qualifying round	(Belgium) Anderlecht	0–2	0–3	0–5
2023–24	UEFA Europa Conference League	First qualifying round	(Faroe Islands) B36 Tórshavn	0–2 (a.e.t.)	0–0	0–2
2024–25	UEFA Conference League	First qualifying round	(Wales) Bala Town	1−1 (a.e.t.)	2–1	3–2
2024–25	UEFA Conference League	Second qualifying round	(Iceland) Stjarnan	4–0	1–2	5–2
2024–25	UEFA Conference League	Third qualifying round	(Sweden) BK Häcken	1−1	1−6	2–7
2025–26	UEFA Conference League	First qualifying round	(Gibraltar) FCB Magpies	4–1	3–2	7–3
2025–26	UEFA Conference League	Second qualifying round	(Sweden) AIK	0–2	0–6	0–8
2026–27	UEFA Conference League	First qualifying round	(Lithuania) Hegelmann	3–0	1–1	4–1
2026–27	UEFA Conference League	Second qualifying round	(Azerbaijan) Zira	1–0	1–1	2–1
2026–27	UEFA Conference League	Third qualifying round	(Austria) Rapid Wien	1–4	0–2	1–6
2027–28	UEFA Conference League	First qualifying round				
