= Estonia national youth football team =

The Estonia national youth football teams are a group of six teams that represents Estonia in association football at various specific age levels, ranging from under-15 to under-21. All of the teams are controlled by Estonian Football Association, the governing body for football in Estonia.

The six teams are the following:

- Estonia national under-21 football team
- Estonia national under-19 football team
- Estonia national under-18 football team
- Estonia national under-17 football team
- Estonia national under-16 football team
- Estonia national under-15 football team
