= 2021 FC Flora season =

Overview of the 2021 season of the Estonian football club FC Flora

Flora
2021 season
- President: Pelle Pohlak
- Manager: Jürgen Henn
- Stadium: A. Le Coq Arena
- Meistriliiga: 2nd
- 2020–21 Estonian Cup: Runners-up
- 2021–22 Estonian Cup: Fourth round (continued into next season)
- Estonian Supercup: Winners
- UEFA Champions League: Second qualifying round
- UEFA Europa League: Third qualifying round
- UEFA Europa Conference League: Group stage
- Top goalscorer: League: Rauno Sappinen (23); All: Rauno Sappinen (35)
Home colours	Away colours
- All statistics correct as of 31 December 2021.

The 2021 season is Flora's 31st season as a professional football club, all coming from the Meistriliiga, the highest division of the Estonian Football Association annual football championship. In addition to the domestic league, the club will also compete in both the 2020–21 and 2021–22 editions of the Estonian Cup, the Estonian Supercup, the UEFA Champions League, the UEFA Europa League, and the inaugural edition of the UEFA Europa Conference League.

== Players ==
As of 5 March 2021

Note: Flags indicate national team as defined under FIFA eligibility rules; some limited exceptions apply. Players may hold more than one non-FIFA nationality.

No.	Pos.	Nation	Player
1	GK	EST	Ingmar Krister Paplavskis
2	DF	EST	Märten Kuusk
4	DF	EST	Marco Lukka
7	FW	EST	Sten Reinkort
8	FW	EST	Henrik Ojamaa
9	FW	EST	Rauno Alliku
10	MF	EST	Martin Miller
11	FW	EST	Rauno Sappinen
14	MF	EST	Konstantin Vassiljev
16	DF	EST	Erko Tõugjas
17	FW	EST	Mark Anders Lepik
20	FW	EST	Sergei Zenjov

No.	Pos.	Nation	Player
21	MF	EST	Rocco Robert Shein
22	FW	EST	Taaniel Usta
23	MF	EST	Henri Välja
24	DF	EST	Henrik Pürg
25	DF	EST	Ken Kallaste
26	DF	EST	Kristo Hussar
27	DF	EST	Michael Lilander
28	MF	EST	Markus Soomets
31	GK	EST	Karl-Romet Nõmm
32	GK	EST	Matvei Igonen
35	MF	EST	Markus Poom
43	DF	EST	Markkus Seppik

== Transfers ==
=== In ===
No.	Pos	Player	Transferred from	Fee	Date	Source
	GK	Karl-Romet Nõmm (EST)	Viljandi JK Tulevik (EST)	Undisclosed	11 December 2020	
	FW	Sten Reinkort (EST)	Tartu JK Tammeka (EST)	Undisclosed	14 December 2020	
	FW	Henrik Ojamaa (EST)	Widzew Łódź (POL)	Undisclosed	7 January 2021	
	FW	Sergei Zenjov (EST)	Shakhter Karagandy (KAZ)	Undisclosed	20 January 2021	
	DF	Erko Jonne Tõugjas (EST)	Nõmme United (EST)	Undisclosed	3 February 2021	

=== Out ===
No.	Pos	Player	Transferred to	Fee	Date	Source
3	DF	Enar Jääger (EST)		Retired	5 December 2020	
7	MF	Frank Liivak (EST)	Unattached	Released	18 December 2020	
20	MF	Leonid Arhipov (EST)	Tallinna Legion (EST)	End of loan	13 January 2021	
77	GK	Kristen Lapa (EST)	Kuressaare (EST)	Undisclosed	12 January 2021	
5	MF	Vladislav Kreida (EST)	Helsingborgs IF (SWE)	Loan	17 January 2021	

== Competitions ==
=== Overall record ===
Competition	First match	Last match	Starting round	Final position	Record							
Competition	First match	Last match	Starting round	Final position	Pld	W	D	L	GF	GA	GD	Win %
Meistriliiga	11 April 2021	6 November 2021	Matchday 1	2nd	32	23	8	1	90	23	+67	71.88
2020–21 Estonian Cup	3 August 2020		Fourth round	Runners-up	4	3	0	1	8	3	+5	75.00
2021–22 Estonian Cup	2021		TBD		2	2	0	0	17	0	+17	100.00
Estonian Supercup	5 March 2021		Final	Winners	1	1	0	0	1	0	+1	100.00
UEFA Champions League	6 July 2021	27 July 2021	First qualifying round	Second qualifying round	4	2	0	2	6	3	+3	50.00
UEFA Europa League	5 August 2021	10 August 2021	Third qualifying round	Third qualifying round	2	1	0	1	2	2	+0	50.00
UEFA Europa Conference League	August 2021		Play-off round	Group Stage	8	3	2	3	10	10	+0	37.50
Total					53	35	10	8	134	41	+93	66.04

Last updated: 10 August 2021
Source: Eesti Jalgpalli Liit

=== Meistriliiga ===
==== League table ====
Pos	Team	Pld	W	D	L	GF	GA	GD	Pts	Qualification or relegation
1	FCI Levadia (C)	32	25	3	4	84	38	+46	78	Qualification for the Champions League preliminary round
2	Flora	32	23	8	1	90	23	+67	77	Qualification for the Europa Conference League first qualifying round (Note: Paide Linnameeskond qualified for the Europa Conference League first qualifying round by winning the 2021–22 Estonian Cup.)
3	Paide Linnameeskond	32	18	8	6	66	35	+31	62	Qualification for the Europa Conference League first qualifying round
4	Nõmme Kalju	32	13	6	13	57	44	+13	45	
5	Legion	32	11	7	14	49	48	+1	40	

Source: Estonian Football Association (in Estonian), UEFA
Rules for classification: 1) Points; 2) Less matches awarded against; 3) Head-to-head points; 4) Head-to-head goal difference; 5) Matches won; 6) Goal difference; 7) Goals scored; 8) Away goals scored; 9) Fairplay ranking.
(C) Champions

==== Results summary ====
Overall								Home						Away					
Pld	W	D	L	GF	GA	GD	Pts	W	D	L	GF	GA	GD	W	D	L	GF	GA	GD
17	12	4	1	40	12	+28	40	5	2	0	16	4	+12	7	2	1	24	8	+16

Last updated: 14 August 2021.
Source: Soccerway

==== Matches ====
11 April 2021 6	TJK Legion	1–2	Flora	Tallinn
19:00 EEST	Artur Šarnin (yellow card) 14'; Aleksandr Sapovalov 42'; Andreyev (yellow card) 52'; Nikolay Mashichev (yellow card) 57'; Leonid Arhipov (yellow card) 85'; Olberkis (yellow card) 90+1'	Report	Sappinen 28' 53' (pen.); Pürg (yellow card) 70'	Stadium: Kadriorg Stadium; Referee: (Estonia) Kristo Tohver

17 April 2021 7	Flora	5–0	Narva Trans	Tallinn
16:00 EEST	Sappinen 3' 8'; Poom (yellow card) 13'; Pürg 21'; Zenjov 43'; Alliku 90+2'	Report	Davlatmir (yellow card) 50'; Daaniel Maanas (yellow card) 87'	Stadium: A. Le Coq Arena; Referee: (Estonia) Eiko Saar

20 April 2021 8	Tulevik	3–3	Flora	Viljandi
18:45 EEST	Kristjan Kask 14' 52'; Daniil Petrunin (yellow card) 29'; Ridwan Babatunde (yellow card) 39'; Marten Ritson (yellow card) 54'; Tanel Lang (yellow card) 68'; Arcenciel Mintongo (yellow card) 88'; Ogungbe 90'	Report	Kristo Hussar (yellow card) 15'; Henri Välja 34'; Sappinen 55' (o.g.); Lilander (yellow card) 59'; Poom (yellow card) 61'; Saag 86' (o.g.)	Stadium: Viljandi linnastaadion Referee: (Estonia) Siim Rinken

25 April 2021 9	Flora	0–0	FCI Levadia	Tallinn
15:00 EEST	Ojamaa (yellow card) 30'; Igonen (yellow card) 90+4'	Report	Roosnupp (yellow card) 27'; Milijan Ilić (yellow card) 33'	Stadium: A. Le Coq Arena; Referee: (Estonia) Martti Pukk

30 April 2021 10	Kuressaare	0–4	Flora	Kuressaare
19:00 EEST	Sander Seeman (yellow card) 40'	Report	Markkus Seppik 35' (yellow card) 66'; Vassiljev 70'; Zenjov 71'; Sappinen 85'	Stadium: Kuressaare linnastaadion Referee: (Estonia) Juri Frischer

5 May 2021 11	Nõmme Kalju	1–2	Flora	Tallinn
19:30 EEST	Natkho (yellow card) 57' (yellow-red card) 73'; Subbotin (yellow card) 62'; Aleksandr Volkov 76' (pen.); Markovych (yellow card) 90+1'	Report	Zenjov 36'; Poom (yellow card) 71'; Markkus Seppik (yellow card) 76'; Alliku 85'	Stadium: Hiiu Stadium; Referee: (Estonia) Grigori Ošomkov

8 May 2021 12	Flora	2–1	Legion	Tallinn
13:00 EEST	Sappinen 19'; Alliku 19'	Report	Kirill Nesterov (yellow card) 53'; Puri 90'	Stadium: A. Le Coq Arena; Referee: (Estonia) Joonas Jaanovits

15 May 2021 13	Flora	P–P	Tammeka	Tallinn
				Stadium: A. Le Coq Arena

19 May 2021 14	FCI Levadia	2–4	Flora	Tallinn
20:00 EEST	Antonov (yellow card) 9'; Kirss 47' (yellow card) 74'; Agyiri (yellow card) 70'; Zhurakhovskyi (yellow card) 73'; Bayenko 90+2'	Report	Ojamaa (yellow card) 5' (goal) 28'; Vassiljev 10'; Sappinen 22'; Marco Lukka (yellow card) 64'; Poom 78' (yellow card) 85'; Igonen (yellow card) 90+3'	Stadium: A. Le Coq Arena; Referee: (Estonia) Joonas Jaanovits

26 May 2021 15	Trans	0–2	Flora	Narva
20:00 EEST	Nikita Zagrebelnyi (yellow card) 39'; Davlatmir (yellow card) 90+2'	Report	Vassiljev 19'; Zenjov (yellow card) 56'; Ojamaa 85'	Stadium: Kreenholmi staadion Referee: (Estonia) Siim Rinken

29 May 2021 16	Flora	3–0	Tulevik	Tallinn
16:00 EEST	Soomets (yellow card) 17'; Poom (yellow card) 24'; Henri Välja 31' (pen.); Pürg 55'; Sappinen 72'; Ojamaa (yellow card) 89'	Report	Gerdo Juhkam (yellow card) 30'; Kazeem Bolaji (yellow card) 74'	Stadium: A. Le Coq Arena; Referee: (Estonia) Kristo Külljastinen

13 June 2021 1	Flora	2–0	Vaprus	Tallinn
13:00 EEST	Marco Lukka (yellow card) 15'; Miller 39'; Markkus Seppik 77'	Report	Robin Limberg (yellow card) 9' (yellow-red card) 30'; Ranet Ristikivi (yellow card) 90+2'	Stadium: A. Le Coq Arena; Referee: (Estonia) Grigori Ošomkov
Note: This match was originally planned for 5 March 2021 but was postponed due to COVID-19.

21 June 2021 3	Tammeka	0–3	Flora	Tartu
17:00 EEST	Kevin Anderson (yellow card) 50'	Report	Poom 18'; Sappinen 24' 41'; Kallaste (yellow card) 80'	Stadium: Tamme Stadium; Attendance: 436; Referee: (Estonia) Kristo Külljastinen

25 June 2021 2	Flora	1–0	Nõmme Kalju	Tallinn
20:00 EEST	Soomets (yellow card) 77'; Alliku 80'	Report	Subbotin (yellow card) 39'; Markovych (yellow card) 76'; Alex Matthias Tamm (yellow card) 84'	Stadium: A. Le Coq Arena; Attendance: 672; Referee: (Estonia) Karl Koppel

30 June 2021 18	Flora	3–3	Paide	Tallinn
20:00 EEST	Soomets 29'; Vassiljev 31'; Sappinen 66' (yellow card) 90+2'; Miller (yellow card) 70'; Zenjov (yellow card) 89'; Henri Välja (yellow card) 90+4'	Report	Kevor Palumets (yellow card) 33'; Ojamaa (yellow card) 36' (goal) 90+4'; Frolov (yellow card) 38'; Anier 85' (pen.) 88'	Stadium: A. Le Coq Arena; Attendance: 1,046; Referee: (Estonia) Kristo Tohver

16 July 2021 17	Vaprus	0–4	Flora	Pärnu
19:30 EEST	Tõnis Vihmoja (yellow card) 26'; Tauno Tekko (yellow card) 36'	Report	Henri Välja 26' (pen.); Rocco Robert Shein (yellow card) 36'; Poom 45'; Danil Kuraksin 45+2'; Zenjov 54'	Stadium: Pärnu Rannastaadion; Attendance: 494; Referee: (Estonia) Kristo Tohver

31 July 2021 5	Paide Linnameeskond	0–0	Flora	Paide
19:00 EEST	Kristofer Piht (yellow card) 33'; Konda (yellow card) 71'; Hadji Dramé (yellow card) 78'	Report	Ojamaa (yellow card) 73'	Stadium: Paide linnastaadion Attendance: 373; Referee: (Estonia) Roomer Tarajev

14 August 2021 20	Kuressaare	1–0	Flora	Kuressaare
19:00 EEST	Märten Pajunurm 51' (pen.); Mööl (yellow card) 57'; Schjønning-Larsen (yellow card) 74'; Otto-Robert Lipp (yellow card) 78'; Magnus Karofeld (yellow card) 90'	Report	Poom (yellow card) 48'; Pürg (yellow card) 50'	Stadium: Kuressaare linnastaadion Attendance: 152; Referee: (Estonia) Grigori Ošomkov

20 August 2021 25	Tulevik	P–P	Flora	Viljandi
16:00 EEST				Stadium: Viljandi linnastaadion

24 August 2021 26	Flora	P–P	Tammeka	Tallinn
19:00 EEST				Stadium: A. Le Coq Arena

27 August 2021 22	Flora	v	Legion	Tallinn
20:00 EEST				Stadium: A. Le Coq Arena

=== Estonian Cup ===
==== 2020–21 ====
The tournament continued from the 2020 season.

23 January 2021 Fourth round	Kuressaare	0–4	Flora	Kuressaare
13:00 EET	Pajunurm (yellow card) 15'; Miil (yellow card) 66'	Report	Kuusk 41', 57'; Seppik 82'; Pürg 90+1'	Stadium: Kuressaare linnastaadion Referee: Joonas Jaanovits

9 March 2021 Quarter-final	Flora	2–1	Tammeka	Tallinn
20:00 (UTC+3)	Reinkort 38'; Vassiljev 59'	Report	Mätas 87'	Stadium: EJL jalgpallihall Referee: Kristo Külljastinen

11 May 2021 Semi-final	Flora	2–1	Narva Trans	Tallinn
20:00 EEST	Zenjov 9'; Sappinen 75' (pen.); Alliku (yellow card) 90'	Report	Marku (yellow card) 9'; Gleb Pevtsov 19'; Denis Polyakov (yellow card) 80'; Roman Nesterovski (yellow card) 81'	Stadium: A. Le Coq Arena; Referee: (Estonia) Kristo Külljastinen

22 May 2021 Final	FCI Levadia	1–0	Flora	Tallinn
19:30 EEST	Antonov (yellow card) 16'; Kirss 70'; Beglarishvili (yellow card) 80'; Lepistu (yellow card) 82'	Report	Ojamaa (yellow card) 37'; Marco Lukka (yellow card) 61'; Pürg (yellow card) 81'	Stadium: A. Le Coq Arena; Referee: (Estonia) Juri Frischer

==== 2021–22 ====
The tournament will continue into the 2022 season.

=== Estonian Supercup ===
5 March 2021 Final	Flora	1–0	Paide	Tallinn
13:00 EET	Sappinen 52'; Alliku (yellow card) 90'	Report	Sekyere (yellow card) 89'; Ojamaa (yellow card) 90+2'	Stadium: A. Le Coq Arena; Attendance: 0 Referee: Karl Koppel; Assistant referees: Riivo Stolts, Raul Kaivoja; Fourth official: Toomas Nõmmiste

=== UEFA Champions League ===
==== First qualifying round ====
6 July 2021 First leg	Flora (Estonia)	2–0	(Malta) Hibernians	A. Le Coq Arena, Tallinn
18:00 (19:00 EEST)	Sappinen 75', 89'	Report		Attendance: 1,804; Referee: Lazar Lukić (Serbia)

13 July 2021 Second leg	Hibernians (Malta)	0–3 (0–5 agg.)	(Estonia) Flora	Centenary Stadium, Ta' Qali
18:00		Report	Zenjov 25'; Sappinen 33'; Reinkort 87'	Attendance: 155; Referee: Manfredas Lukjančukas (Lithuania)

==== Second qualifying round ====
21 July 2021 First leg	Legia Warsaw (Poland)	2–1	(Estonia) Flora	Stadion Wojska Polskiego, Warsaw
21:00	Kapustka 3'; Lopes 90+1'	Report	Sappinen 53'	Attendance: 16,721; Referee: Vitali Meshkov (Russia)

27 July 2021 Second leg	Flora (Estonia)	0–1 (1–3 agg.)	(Poland) Legia Warsaw	A. Le Coq Arena, Tallinn
18:00 (19:00 EEST)		Report	Lopes 67'	Attendance: 3,691; Referee: Anastasios Papapetrou (Greece)

=== UEFA Europa League ===
==== Third qualifying round ====
5 August 2021 First leg	Omonia (Cyprus)	1–0	(Estonia) Flora	GSP Stadium, Strovolos
19:00	Tzionis 12'	Report	Kuusk (yellow card) 86'	Attendance: 8,0333; Referee: (Romania) Radu Petrescu

10 August 2021 Second leg	Flora (Estonia)	2–1 (a.e.t.) (2–2 agg.) (4–5 p)	(Cyprus) Omonia	A. Le Coq Arena, Tallinn
18:00 (19:00 EEST)	Sappinen 48', 88'	Report	Kakoullis 43'	Referee: Ivan Kružliak (Slovakia)
	Penalties
	Ojamaa (penalty scored); Zenjov (penalty scored); Lilander (penalty scored); Lukka (penalty missed); Alliku (penalty scored); Reinkort (penalty missed)		(penalty scored) Gómez; (penalty scored) Papoulis; (penalty scored) Atiemwen; (penalty scored) Psaltis; (penalty missed) Lang; (penalty scored) Yuste

=== UEFA Europa Conference League ===
==== Play-off round ====
19 August 2021 First Leg	Flora (Estonia)	4–2	(Republic of Ireland) Shamrock Rovers	Tallinn
19:00 EEST	Zenjov 13'; Miller 27' 87'; Ojamaa (yellow card) 66'; Sappinen 76'	Report	O'Brien (yellow card) 37'; Burke 44'; Liam Scales 86'	Stadium: A. Le Coq Arena; Attendance: 1,129; Referee: (Ukraine) Yevhen Aranovskyi

26 August 2021 Second leg	Shamrock Rovers (Republic of Ireland)	0–1 (2–5 agg.)	(Estonia) Flora	Tallaght Stadium, Dublin
21:00 (20:00 IST)		Report	Sappinen 57'	Attendance: 3,500; Referee: Tamás Bognár (Hungary)

==== Group stage ====
The draw for the group stage was held on 27 August 2021.

Pos	Team	Pld	W	D	L	GF	GA	GD	Pts	Qualification	GNT	PAR	ANO	FLO
1	(Belgium) Gent	6	4	1	1	6	2	+4	13	Advance to round of 16	—	1–1	2–0	1–0
2	(Serbia) Partizan	6	2	2	2	6	4	+2	8	Advance to knockout round play-offs	0–1	—	1–1	2–0
3	(Cyprus) Anorthosis Famagusta	6	1	3	2	6	9	−3	6		1–0	0–2	—	2–2
4	(Estonia) Flora	6	1	2	3	5	8	−3	5		0–1	1–0	2–2	—

Source: UEFA
Rules for classification: Group stage tiebreakers

16 September 2021	Flora (Estonia)	0–1	(Belgium) Gent	Lilleküla Stadium, Tallinn
18:45 (19:45 EEST)		Report	Lemajić 54'	Attendance: 2,666; Referee: Trustin Farrugia Cann (Malta)

30 September 2021	Partizan (Serbia)	2–0	(Estonia) Flora	Partizan Stadium, Belgrade
18:45	Marković 20', 42'	Report		Attendance: 4,845; Referee: Julian Weinberger (Austria)

21 October 2021	Anorthosis Famagusta (Cyprus)	2–2	(Estonia) Flora	GSP Stadium, Nicosia
18:45 (19:45 EEST)	Deletić 25'; Popović 28'	Report	Sappinen 38', 80'	Attendance: 4,322; Referee: István Vad (Hungary)

4 November 2021	Flora (Estonia)	2–2	(Cyprus) Anorthosis Famagusta	Lilleküla Stadium, Tallinn
16:30 (17:30 EET)	Sappinen 55'; Zenjov 58'	Report	Christofi 29'; Popović 33'	Attendance: 2,023; Referee: Kári á Høvdanum (Faroe Islands)

25 November 2021	Flora (Estonia)	1-0	(Serbia) Partizan	Lilleküla Stadium, Tallinn
21:00 (22:00 EET)	Miller 44'	Report		Attendance: 1.503; Referee: Rob Harvey (Republic of Ireland)

9 December 2021	Gent (Belgium)	1–0	(Estonia) Flora	Ghelamco Arena, Ghent
18:45	Bruno 51'	Report		Attendance: 7,421; Referee: Kaspar Sjöberg (Sweden)

== Statistics ==
=== Goalscorers ===
Rank	No.	Pos	Nat	Name	Meistriliiga	2020–21 Estonian Cup	2021–22 Estonian Cup	Estonian Supercup	Champions League	Europa League	Europa Conference League	Total
1	11	FW	(Estonia)	Rauno Sappinen	12	1	0	1	4	2	2	22
2	20	FW	(Estonia)	Sergei Zenjov	4	1	0	0	1	0	1	7
3	14	MF	(Estonia)	Konstantin Vassiljev	4	1	0	0	0	0	0	5
4	9	FW	(Estonia)	Rauno Alliku	4	0	0	0	0	0	0	4
5	10	MF	(Estonia)	Martin Miller	1	0	0	0	0	0	2	3
5	23	MF	(Estonia)	Henri Välja	3	0	0	0	0	0	0	3
5	35	MF	(Estonia)	Markus Poom	3	0	0	0	0	0	0	3
8	2	DF	(Estonia)	Märten Kuusk	0	2	0	0	0	0	0	2
8	7	FW	(Estonia)	Sten Reinkort	0	1	0	0	1	0	0	2
8	8	FW	(Estonia)	Henrik Ojamaa	2	0	0	0	0	0	0	2
8	24	DF	(Estonia)	Henrik Pürg	1	1	0	0	0	0	0	2
8	43	DF	(Estonia)	Markkus Seppik	1	1	0	0	0	0	0	2
13	28	MF	(Estonia)	Markus Soomets	1	0	0	0	0	0	0	1
13	54	MF	(Estonia)	Danil Kuraksin	1	0	0	0	0	0	0	1
Own goals					2	0	0	0	0	0	0	2
Totals					40	8	0	1	6	2	5	60

Last updated: 26 August 2021

=== Clean sheets ===
Rank	No.	Pos	Nat	Name	Meistriliiga	2020–21 Estonian Cup	2021–22 Estonian Cup	Estonian Supercup	Champions League	Total
1	32	GK	(Estonia)	Matvei Igonen	6	2	0	1	2	11
Totals					6	2	0	1	2	11

Last updated: 21 July 2021
