= List of Estonian football transfers winter 2022–23 =

This is a list of Estonian football transfers in the winter transfer window 2022–23 by club. Only top-division transfers are included.

This transfer window was open between the 2022 Meistriliiga and the 2023 Meistriliiga season until 3 March 2023. Harju JK Laagri will debut in the league, while TJK Legion will play in a lower division.

== Meistriliiga ==
=== Flora ===
In:

No.	Pos.	Nation	Player
—	FW	(Estonia) EST	Andreas Kiivit (loan return from Vaprus) →
2	DF	(Estonia) EST	Märten Kuusk (loan from (Hungary) Újpest)
—	FW	(Estonia) EST	Otto-Robert Lipp (loan return from Kuressaare)
13	MF	(Estonia) EST	Nikita Mihhailov (from Trans)
—	DF	(Estonia) EST	Mathias Palts (loan return from Legion) →
1	GK	(Estonia) EST	Ingmar Krister Paplavskis (loan return from Kuressaare)
21	FW	(Estonia) EST	Sten Reinkort (loan return from Kuressaare)
16	DF	(Estonia) EST	Erko Jonne Tõugjas (loan return from Legion)
—	MF	(Estonia) EST	Henri Välja (loan return from Tammeka) →

Out:

No.	Pos.	Nation	Player
—	FW	(Estonia) EST	Andreas Kiivit (to Kalev)
5	MF	(Estonia) EST	Vladislav Kreida (loan to (Republic of Ireland) St. Patrick’s Athletic)
17	FW	(Estonia) EST	Mark Anders Lepik (loan to Kuressaare)
31	GK	(Estonia) EST	Karl-Romet Nõmm (to (Poland) Sandecja Nowy Sącz)
—	DF	(Estonia) EST	Mathias Palts (loan to Kuressaare)
35	MF	(Estonia) EST	Markus Poom (loan to (Republic of Ireland) Shamrock Rovers)
18	MF	(Estonia) EST	Andrei Smirnov (to Kuressaare)
—	MF	(Estonia) EST	Henri Välja (to Levadia)

=== FCI Levadia ===
In:

No.	Pos.	Nation	Player
11	MF	(Estonia) EST	Mihkel Ainsalu (from (Netherlands) Telstar)
1	GK	(Estonia) EST	Oliver Ani (from Nõmme United)
20	FW	(Cameroon) CMR	Guy Bessala (from (Cameroon) Kadji Sports Academy)
9	FW	(Brazil) BRA	Felipe Felicio (loan from (Brazil) Atlético Mineiro)
—	MF	(Estonia) EST	Aleksander Filatov (from Nõmme United)
3	MF	(Brazil) BRA	Heitor (from (Brazil) Gremio)
17	FW	(Estonia) EST	Henri Käblik (from Tammeka)
4	DF	(United States) USA	Vuk Latinovich (from (United States) New York City)
—	FW	(Estonia) EST	Devid Lehter (loan return from Elva) →
—	FW	(Ukraine) UKR	Illya Markovskyi (from (Israel) Hapoel Haifa)
—	GK	(Russia) RUS	Maksim Pavlov (from Trans)
2	DF	(Estonia) EST	Michael Schjønning-Larsen (from Kuressaare)
7	MF	(Estonia) EST	Edgar Tur (from Paide)
23	MF	(Estonia) EST	Henri Välja (from Flora)
10	FW	(Estonia) EST	Ioan Yakovlev (from Kalev)
24	MF	(Russia) RUS	Aleksandr Zakarlyuka (from Trans)

Out:

No.	Pos.	Nation	Player
67	MF	(Estonia) EST	Ilja Antonov (to Nõmme Kalju)
49	FW	(Georgia (country)) GEO	Zakaria Beglarishvili (to (Uzbekistan) Turon Yaypan)
16	DF	(Estonia) EST	Markus Jürgenson
17	FW	(Estonia) EST	Robert Kirss (to (Poland) Sandecja Nowy Sącz)
81	GK	(Estonia) EST	Artur Kotenko (end of career)
—	FW	(Estonia) EST	Devid Lehter (to Tammeka)
10	MF	(Estonia) EST	Brent Lepistu (to (Romania) Mioveni)
11	FW	(Brazil) BRA	Liliu
3	DF	(Serbia) SRB	Milan Mitrović
55	FW	(Estonia) EST	Karl Rudolf Õigus (to Kuressaare)
22	DF	(Estonia) EST	Artur Pikk (to (Poland) Odra Opole)
25	DF	(Estonia) EST	Maksim Podholjuzin (to Nõmme Kalju)
9	MF	(Estonia) EST	Mark Oliver Roosnupp (to (Serbia) Napredak Kruševac)
84	FW	(Tajikistan) TJK	Rustam Soirov (to (Uzbekistan) Lokomotiv Tashkent)
4	DF	(Italy) ITA	Maximiliano Uggè

=== Paide Linnameeskond ===
In:

No.	Pos.	Nation	Player
26	DF	(Estonia) EST	Siim Aer (loan return from Vaprus)
28	MF	(Estonia) EST	Oskar Hõim (from Tabasalu)
17	FW	(Estonia) EST	Dimitri Jepihhin (from Nõmme United)
5	DF	(Estonia) EST	Gerdo Juhkam (from Tammeka)
—	MF	(Estonia) EST	Silver Alex Kelder (from Kuressaare)
—	MF	(Estonia) EST	Kevin Metso (loan return from Vaprus)
24	DF	(Netherlands) NED	Dehninio Muringen
2	DF	(Estonia) EST	Oliver Niit (from Flora U21)
—	MF	(The Gambia) GAM	Foday Trawally (loan return from Kalev) →

Out:

No.	Pos.	Nation	Player
17	FW	(Estonia) EST	Raimond Eino
28	DF	(Estonia) EST	Rasmus Kallas (to Tammeka)
15	DF	(Estonia) EST	Ragnar Klavan
30	FW	(Estonia) EST	Jaagup Luts
23	FW	(The Gambia) GAM	Bubacarr Tambedou (loan to (Moldova) Sheriff Tiraspol)
—	MF	(The Gambia) GAM	Foday Trawally (loan extension to Kalev)
20	MF	(Estonia) EST	Edgar Tur (to Levadia)

=== Nõmme Kalju ===
In:

No.	Pos.	Nation	Player
67	MF	(Estonia) EST	Ilja Antonov (from Levadia)
—	FW	(Canada) CAN	Promise David (from (Malta) Sirens)
11	FW	(France) FRA	Djibril Dianessy
23	FW	(Finland) FIN	Anton Eerola (from (Germany) Kaiserslautern II)
50	DF	(Estonia) EST	Maksim Podholjuzin (from Levadia)
33	MF	(Belgium) BEL	Olivier Rommens (from (Lithuania) Sūduva)

Out:

No.	Pos.	Nation	Player
22	DF	(Estonia) EST	Trevor Elhi
9	FW	(Liberia) LBR	William Jebor
12	GK	(Estonia) EST	Sergei Lepmets
97	MF	(Croatia) CRO	Daniel Sudar
77	MF	(Estonia) EST	Stanislav Tsombaljuk (loan to Nõmme United)

=== Kuressaare ===
In:

No.	Pos.	Nation	Player
20	MF	(Estonia) EST	Pavel Dõmov (from Legion)
99	FW	(Estonia) EST	Mark Anders Lepik (loan from Flora)
44	GK	(Estonia) EST	Enri Nurmik (from SC ReUnited)
7	MF	(Estonia) EST	Karl Rudolf Õigus (from Levadia)
2	DF	(Estonia) EST	Mathias Palts (loan from Flora)
24	DF	(Estonia) EST	Oscar Pihela (from Levadia U21)
18	MF	(Estonia) EST	Andrei Smirnov (from Flora)
70	DF	(Estonia) EST	Joonas Vahermägi (from Flora U21)

Out:

No.	Pos.	Nation	Player
11	MF	(Estonia) EST	Silver Alex Kelder (to Paide)
46	FW	(Estonia) EST	Otto-Robert Lipp (loan return to Flora)
23	GK	(Estonia) EST	Ingmar Krister Paplavskis (loan return to Flora)
17	FW	(Estonia) EST	Sten Reinkort (loan return to Flora)
2	DF	(Estonia) EST	Michael Schjønning-Larsen (to Levadia)
10	MF	(Estonia) EST	Sander Seeman (end of career)
19	MF	(Estonia) EST	Daniel Tuhkanen (loan to Nõmme United)
24	MF	(Estonia) EST	Rauno Tutk (medical reasons)

=== Tartu Tammeka ===
In:

No.	Pos.	Nation	Player
—	DF	(Italy) ITA	Eugenio Bracelli
—	DF	(Estonia) EST	Rasmus Kallas (from Paide)
—	FW	(Estonia) EST	Devid Lehter (from Levadia)

Out:

No.	Pos.	Nation	Player
60	DF	(Ghana) GHA	David Addy
12	GK	(Estonia) EST	Marcus Agarmaa (loan to Welco)
6	DF	(Estonia) EST	Gerdo Juhkam (to Paide)
21	FW	(Estonia) EST	Henri Käblik (to Levadia)
17	MF	(Estonia) EST	Sander Kapper (to Vaprus)
44	MF	(Russia) RUS	Aleksandr Kukharev
2	DF	(Estonia) EST	Karl Läänelaid (to Nõmme United)
1	GK	(Estonia) EST	Karl Pechter
30	MF	(Estonia) EST	Henri Välja (loan return to Flora)

=== Narva Trans ===
In:

No.	Pos.	Nation	Player
20	DF	(The Gambia) GAM	Momodou Lamin Darboe
10	FW	(Ukraine) UKR	Ihor Karpenko (from (Poland) Odra Wodzisław Śląski)
4	DF	(Brazil) BRA	Kauan Alexandre Martins de Paula (from (Brazil) Anápolis)
90	MF	(South Korea) KOR	Kim Do-hyun (from (Slovenia) Triglav)
9	FW	(Estonia) EST	Tristan Koskor (from (Cyprus) Peyia)
25	GK	(Estonia) EST	Aleksandr Kraizmer (from Levadia)
18	DF	(Serbia) SRB	Alex Markovic (from (Hungary) MTK Budapest II)
27	DF	(Estonia) EST	Aleksandr Nikolajev (loan from Legion)
7	FW	(Estonia) EST	Daniil Tarassenkov (loan from Legion)
8	MF	(Colombia) COL	Harlin Jose Suarez Torres (from (Finland) KTP)

Out:

No.	Pos.	Nation	Player
4	DF	(Estonia) EST	Kevin Aloe (to Vaprus)
1	DF	(Ukraine) UKR	Denys Dedechko
8	MF	(Estonia) EST	Jevgeni Demidov
99	FW	(Estonia) EST	Eduard Golovljov
23	DF	(Estonia) EST	Martin Käos (to Vaprus)
71	MF	(Estonia) EST	Arseni Kovaltšuk (to Kalev)
79	MF	(Ukraine) UKR	Oleksandr Kozhevnikov
13	MF	(Estonia) EST	Nikita Mihhailov (to Flora)
5	DF	(Estonia) EST	Roman Nesterovski (end of career)
69	GK	(Estonia) EST	Maksim Pavlov (to Levadia)
80	FW	(Ukraine) UKR	Volodymyr Pryyomov
9	FW	(Estonia) EST	Raivo Saar
3	DF	(Ukraine) UKR	Denys Taraduda
10	MF	(Russia) RUS	Aleksandr Zakarlyuka (to Levadia)

=== Tallinna Kalev ===
In:

No.	Pos.	Nation	Player
—	GK	(Finland) FIN	Oskari Forsman (from (Finland) VPS)
—	FW	(Estonia) EST	Andreas Kiivit (from Flora U21)
—	MF	(Estonia) EST	Arseni Kovaltšuk (from Trans)
—	MF	(Estonia) EST	Sander Sinilaid (from Vaprus)
—	MF	(The Gambia) GAM	Foday Trawally (loan extension from Paide)
—	FW	(Estonia) EST	Georg Vende (from Flora U21)

Out:

No.	Pos.	Nation	Player
8	FW	(Estonia) EST	Hannes Anier (injury, end of career)
23	MF	(Estonia) EST	Daniil Petrunin (to (Spain) Atlético Porcuna)
7	MF	(Estonia) EST	Reinhard Reimaa (to Harju)
2	DF	(Ukraine) UKR	Valeriy Stepanenko
20	MF	(The Gambia) GAM	Foday Trawally (loan return to Paide) ←
10	FW	(Estonia) EST	Ioan Yakovlev (to Levadia)

=== Pärnu Vaprus ===
In:

No.	Pos.	Nation	Player
15	DF	(Estonia) EST	Kevin Aloe (from Trans)
7	DF	(Estonia) EST	Martin Käos (from Trans)
17	MF	(Estonia) EST	Sander Kapper (from Tartu Tammeka)
21	MF	(Estonia) EST	Reimo Madissoo (from PJK)
90	MF	(Estonia) EST	Joonas Sild (from PJK)

Out:

No.	Pos.	Nation	Player
26	DF	(Estonia) EST	Siim Aer (loan return to Paide)
14	DF	(Estonia) EST	Martin Kase (end of career)
10	FW	(Estonia) EST	Andreas Kiivit (loan return to Flora U21)
50	DF	(Estonia) EST	Kevin Metso (loan return to Paide)
15	MF	(Estonia) EST	Sander Sinilaid (to Kalev)
22	FW	(Estonia) EST	Taaniel Usta (to Harju)
76	FW	(Estonia) EST	Igor Ustritski (loan return to Flora U21)

=== Harju JK Laagri ===
In:

No.	Pos.	Nation	Player
97	GK	(Latvia) LVA	Ivans Baturins (from Legion)
—	DF	(Estonia) EST	Mark Edur
8	MF	(Guinea-Bissau) GNB	Usalifa Jose Indi
—	DF	(Estonia) EST	Andres Järve (from Levadia)
88	MF	(Estonia) EST	Reinhard Reimaa (from Kalev)
32	DF	(Germany) GER	Marius Samoura
20	MF	(Estonia) EST	Stefan Tšendei (from Legion)
45	MF	(Estonia) EST	Kaarel Usta
77	FW	(Estonia) EST	Taaniel Usta (from Vaprus)
40	MF	(Estonia) EST	Sten Marten Viira (from Flora U21)

Out:

No.	Pos.	Nation	Player
14	DF	(Estonia) EST	Kirill Aleksandr Antonov
7	FW	(Estonia) EST	Paul-Kevin Chan (loan return to Nõmme United)
11	MF	(Estonia) EST	Jens Erik Nielsen
