= List of Estonian football transfers winter 2021–22 =

This is a list of Estonian association football transfers in the winter transfer window 2021–2022 by club.

This transfer window was open between the 2021 Meistriliiga and the 2022 Meistriliiga season. 1 club has changed: JK Tallinna Kalev joins Estonian top division, while Viljandi JK Tulevik was relegated.

== Meistriliiga ==
=== FCI Levadia ===
In:

No.	Pos.	Nation	Player
—	MF	EST	Mihkel Ainsalu (from TJK Legion)
—	FW	UKR	Oleksiy Khoblenko (loan from (Ukraine) Kryvbas Kryvyi Rih)
—	FW	BRA	Liliu (from (Peru) Sport Huancayo)
—	DF	EST	Artur Pikk (from (Latvia) RFS)
—	MF	UKR	Artem Schedryi (loan from (Ukraine) Kryvbas Kryvyi Rih)
—	FW	RUS	Daniil Timofeev (from (Serbia) FK IMT Belgrad U19)
—	MF	EST	Murad Velijev (from Tallinna Kalev)

Out:

No.	Pos.	Nation	Player
20	MF	EST	Hannes Anier (to Tallinna Kalev)
22	DF	EST	Trevor Elhi (to Nõmme Kalju)
11	DF	SRB	Milijan Ilić (to (Serbia) Mladost Novi Sad)
5	DF	SRB	Luka Luković (loan to Pärnu Vaprus)
21	MF	RUS	Amir Natkho
59	FW	EST	~~Bogdan Vaštšuk~~ (~~loan to (Ukraine) Vorskla Poltava~~)
19	FW	AUS	Aamir Yunis Abdallah (loan to Pärnu Vaprus)

=== Flora ===
In:

No.	Pos.	Nation	Player
—	MF	EST	Mihkel Järviste (from Tartu Tammeka)
—	FW	EST	Tristan Koskor (from Tartu Tammeka)
—	DF	EST	Marko Lipp (from FCI Levadia)
—	FW	EST	Aleksandr Šapovalov (from Legion)
—	DF	EST	Joonas Tamm (on loan from (Ukraine) Vorskla Poltava)

Out:

No.	Pos.	Nation	Player
32	GK	EST	Matvei Igonen (to (Poland) Podbeskidzie Bielsko-Biała)
5	MF	EST	Vladislav Kreida (on loan to ~~(Ukraine) Veres Rivne~~ (Sweden) Skövde AIK)
2	DF	EST	Märten Kuusk (to (Hungary) Újpest)
—	DF	EST	Mathias Palts (loan to Tallinna Legion)
7	FW	EST	Sten Reinkort (to Kuressaare)
11	FW	EST	Rauno Sappinen (to (Poland) Piast Gliwice)
21	MF	EST	Rocco Robert Shein (loan to (Netherlands) Jong Utrecht)
23	MF	EST	Henri Välja (loan to Tartu Tammeka)

=== Paide Linnameeskond ===
In:

No.	Pos.	Nation	Player
—	GK	GAM	Ebrima Jarju (from (The Gambia) Real de Banjul)
—	MF	EST	Karl Mööl (loan return from Kuressaare)
—	MF	EST	Herol Riiberg (from Viljandi Tulevik)
—	FW	EST	Kaimar Saag (from Viljandi Tulevik)
—	FW	EST	Robi Saarma (from Nõmme United)
—	MF	FRA	Dominique Simon (from (Spain) Navarro CF)
—	FW	GAM	Ebrima Singhateh (from (The Gambia) Real de Banjul)
—	FW	GAM	Bubacarr Tambedou (from (The Gambia) Real de Banjul)

Out:

No.	Pos.	Nation	Player
8	FW	EST	Henri Anier (to (Thailand) Muangthong United)
11	MF	MLI	Hadji Dramé (to (Georgia (country)) Dila Gori)
14	DF	EST	Martin Kase (to Pärnu Vaprus)
27	FW	EST	Kevin Kauber (to Pärnu Vaprus)
5	MF	EST	Joel Kokla (end of career)
23	DF	GHA	Ishaku Konda (loan return to (Ghana) Asokwa Deportivo)
15	MF	EST	Sander Sinilaid (to Pärnu Vaprus)
18	FW	GAM	Foday Trawally (loan to Kalev)

=== Nõmme Kalju ===
In:

No.	Pos.	Nation	Player
—	DF	EST	Trevor Elhi (from FCI Levadia)
—	MF	TRI	Andre Fortune II (from (United States) Memphis 901)
—	DF	EST	Henri Järvelaid (from (Norway) Sogndal)
—	MF	EST	Nikita Komissarov (from Viljandi JK Tulevik)
—	DF	EST	Artur Šarnin (from TJK Legion)
—	MF	EST	German Šlein (from TJK Legion)

Out:

No.	Pos.	Nation	Player
81	DF	EST	Mark Edur
19	DF	RUS	Aleksandr Ivanjusin
8	FW	UKR	Vladyslav Khomutov (to (Slovakia) ŠTK 1914 Šamorín)
2	DF	EST	Aleksandr Kulinitš (to (Germany) Rostocker FC)
26	DF	UKR	~~Andriy Markovych~~ (~~to (Ukraine) Karpaty Lviv~~)
6	MF	EST	Deniss Tjapkin
22	MF	EST	Kaarel Usta

=== Tallinna Legion ===
In:

No.	Pos.	Nation	Player
—	MF	EST	Deniss Drabinko (loan return from Harju JK Laagri)
—	FW	EST	Filipp Drabinko (loan return from Harju JK Laagri)
—	MF	EST	Nikita Grankin (from Levadia U21)
—	FW	EST	Vladimir Ištšenko (from FCI Tallinn)
—	FW	EST	Nikita Kondratski (from Flora U21)
—	DF	EST	Mathias Palts (loan from Flora)
—	FW	EST	Ivan Timofejev (from Flora U21)
—	MF	EST	Markus Vaherna (from Tallinna Kalev)

Out:

No.	Pos.	Nation	Player
47	FW	EST	Mihkel Ainsalu (to FCI Levadia)
5	DF	EST	Artjom Artjunin (to Levadia U21)
74	FW	MNE	Dušan Bakić (loan return to (Belarus) Dinamo Minsk)
17	MF	EST	Aleksandr Dmitrijev
27	DF	EST	Dmitri Kovtunovitš
11	MF	RUS	Kirill Nesterov (FC Tallinn)
2	DF	LTU	Sigitas Olberkis
7	MF	EST	Sander Puri (to Tartu Tammeka)
38	FW	EST	Aleksandr Šapovalov (to Flora)
77	DF	EST	Artur Šarnin (to Nõmme Kalju)
6	MF	EST	German Šlein (to Nõmme Kalju)

=== Narva Trans ===
In:

No.	Pos.	Nation	Player
—	DF	EST	Kevin Aloe (from Tartu Tammeka)
—	MF	UKR	Denys Dedechko (from (Armenia) Noah)
—	MF	EST	Jevgeni Demidov
—	MF	UKR	Oleksandr Kozhevnikov (from (Ukraine) Vorskla Poltava)
—	DF	EST	Ryan Lindsay (from (Canada) York United)
—	GK	EST	Aleksei Matrossov (from (Tajikistan) FK Khujand)
—	DF	NGA	Lucky Opara (loan from (Latvia) Spartaks Jūrmala)
—	FW	UKR	Volodymyr Pryyomov (from (Ukraine) Tavriya Simferopol)

Out:

No.	Pos.	Nation	Player
11	DF	EST	Maksim Tserezov (to FC Tallinn)
35	DF	LTU	Edgaras Žarskis (to (Lithuania) Džiugas Telšiai)

=== Kuressaare ===
In:

No.	Pos.	Nation	Player
—	DF	EST	Sander Alex Liit (from Nõmme United)
—	MF	EST	Sten-Egert Paap
—	FW	EST	Sten Reinkort (from Flora)
—	MF	EST	Daniel Tuhkanen
—	DF	EST	Moorits Veering
—	DF	EST	Tristan Teeväli

Out:

No.	Pos.	Nation	Player
21	FW	EST	Peeter Klein
4	DF	EST	Ranon Kriisa
33	MF	EST	Karl Mööl (loan return to Paide Linnameeskond)
—	FW	EST	Igor Ustritski (to Pärnu Vaprus)

=== Tartu Tammeka ===
In:

No.	Pos.	Nation	Player
—	DF	GHA	David Addy
—	GK	EST	Carl Kaiser Kiidjärv (from Nõmme United)
—	DF	EST	Gerdo Juhkam (from Viljandi Tulevik)
—	MF	EST	Tanel Lang (from Viljandi Tulevik)
—	MF	EST	Sander Puri (from TJK Legion)
—	MF	EST	Henri Välja (loan from Flora)

Out:

No.	Pos.	Nation	Player
5	DF	EST	Kevin Aloe (to Narva Trans)
10	MF	EST	Mihkel Järviste (to Flora)
19	FW	EST	Tristan Koskor (to Flora)
28	DF	EST	Marko Lipp (to Flora)
6	DF	EST	Mikk Raid (to Team Helm)
—	MF	LVA	Daniils Skopenko

=== Pärnu Vaprus ===
In:

No.	Pos.	Nation	Player
—	DF	EST	Martin Kase (from Paide Linnameeskond)
—	FW	EST	Kristjan Kask (from Viljandi Tulevik)
—	FW	EST	Kevin Kauber (from Paide Linnameeskond)
—	DF	SRB	Luka Lukovic (loan from FCI Levadia)
—	MF	EST	Sander Sinilaid (from Paide Linnameeskond)
—	FW	EST	Taaniel Usta (from Flora U21)
—	FW	EST	Igor Ustritski (from Kuressaare)
—	FW	AUS	Aamir Yunis Abdallah (loan from FCI Levadia)

Out:

No.	Pos.	Nation	Player
15	DF	EST	Henri Hanson (end of professional career)
22	DF	EST	Rasmus Ilves (end of professional career)
26	MF	EST	Marek Kaljumäe (to Tallinna Kalev)
24	MF	EST	Devid Lehter
9	FW	EST	Kristen Saarts (end of professional career)
6	MF	EST	Tauno Tekko
10	DF	EST	Tõnis Vihmoja (end of professional career)

=== Tallinna Kalev ===
In:

No.	Pos.	Nation	Player
—	FW	EST	Hannes Anier (from FCI Levadia)
—	FW	EST	Ioan Jakovlev (from (Spain) CD Torrijos)
—	MF	EST	Marek Kaljumäe
—	FW	EST	Karl Stefan Lill
—	FW	EST	Vadim Mihhailov
—	MF	EST	Daniil Petrunin
—	DF	UKR	Valeriy Stepanenko (from (Kazakhstan) Maktaaral)
—	DF	EST	Jakob Tamberg (loan from (Finland) HJK)
—	MF	GAM	Foday Trawally (loan from Paide Linnameeskond)

Out:

No.	Pos.	Nation	Player
16	MF	NGA	Abdullahi Alfa
—	FW	EST	Nikita Dronov (loan return to Levadia U21)
27	DF	EST	Alger Džumadil
14	MF	EST	Kristofer Käit (loan to (Portugal) FC Porto)
9	FW	EST	Markus Vaherna (to TJK Legion)
10	MF	EST	Murad Velijev (to FCI Levadia)
