= 2020 Estonian Football Winter Tournament =

Tournament details
- Country: Estonia
- Dates: 10 January − 15 February 2020 (Group A, B)
- Teams: 30

The 2020 Estonian Football Winter Tournament or the 2020 EJL Jalgpallihalli Turniir is the fifth edition of the annual tournament in Estonia. This tournament is divided into 5 groups of 7 teams.

== Group A ==
- Here participating premium teams from 1st to 6th in the league.

Team	Pld	W	D	L	GF	GA	GD	Pts
Paide Linnameeskond	3	3	0	0	5	2	+3	9
Tallinna FC Flora	3	2	1	0	5	0	+5	7
Nõmme Kalju FC	5	2	0	3	9	8	+1	6
Tallinna FCI Levadia	5	1	2	2	5	7	−2	5
Tartu JK Tammeka	4	1	1	2	10	9	+1	4
Narva JK Trans	5	0	3	2	2	10	−8	3
Tallinna JK Kalev	1	0	1	0	1	1	0	1

10 January 2020	Tallinna FCI Levadia	2–2	Tartu JK Tammeka	Tallinn
17:45	Roosnupp 29'; Elhi 79'	Report	Mõttus 53'; Tammeorg (yellow card) 78'; Järviste (yellow card) 82'; Reinkort 85'	Stadium: Lasnamäe Indoor Arena; Attendance: 56; Referee: Martti Pukk

11 January 2020	Narva JK Trans	0–3	Nõmme Kalju FC	Tallinn
15:00	Stepanov (yellow card) 78' (yellow-red card)	Report	Puri 22', 39'; Markovych (yellow card) 34'; Veremeev (yellow card) 52'; Klein 82'; Usta (yellow card) 88'	Stadium: Lasnamäe Indoor Arena; Referee: Roomer Tarajev

17 January 2020	Nõmme Kalju FC	0–2	Tallinna FCI Levadia	Tallinn
17:45	Kulinitš (yellow card) 33'; Veremeev (yellow card) 62'	Report	Ochihava (yellow card) 27'; Gando 42'; Dronov (yellow card) 57' (goal) 64'; Grigorjev (yellow card) 60'; Peetson (yellow card) 84'	Stadium: Lasnamäe Indoor Arena; Referee: Kristo Külljastinen

18 January 2020	Narva JK Trans	1–1	Tallinna JK Kalev	Tallinn
18:20	Škinjov (yellow card) 30'; Mihhailov (red card) 52'; Saar 53'; Matrossov (yellow card) 86'	Report	El Aabchi 90'	Stadium: Lasnamäe Indoor Arena; Attendance: 40; Referee: Maksim Ramazanov

25 January 2020	Paide Linnameeskond	2–1	Nõmme Kalju FC	Tallinn
15:00	Tur 20'; Caprioli (yellow card) 42'; Mööl 55'	Report	Pedro Victor (yellow card) 43'; Volkov 72'	Stadium: Lasnamäe Indoor Arena; Referee: Juri Frischer

25 January 2020	Tartu JK Tammeka	5–0	Narva JK Trans	Tallinn
16:50	Preiman 14'; Uljanov 18'; Dudarev (yellow card) 43'; Järviste 45'; Koskor 60'; Slaštšjov (yellow card) 74'; Raid (yellow card) 77'; Mägimets 86'	Report	Kondrattsev (yellow card) 72'	Stadium: Lasnamäe Indoor Arena; Referee: Andrei Karhu

26 January 2020	Tallinna FC Flora	3–0	Tallinna FCI Levadia	Tallinn
15:00	Sinyavskiy 19'; Liivak 56' (pen.); Välja 58'; Soomets (yellow card) 64'	Report	Podholjuzin (yellow card) 49'; Gando (yellow card) 71'; Elhi (yellow card) 73'; Kirss (yellow card) 80'	Referee: Roomer Tarajev

31 January 2020	Tallinna FCI Levadia	0–1	Paide Linnameeskond	Tallinn
17:45	Vaštšuk (yellow card) 29'; Lepistu (yellow card) 56'; Podholjuzin (yellow card) 69'; Komlov (yellow card) 83'; Õigus (yellow card) 90'	Report	Frolov (yellow card) 22'; Luts 61'	Attendance: 64; Referee: Miko Pupart

1 February 2020	Nõmme Kalju	5–2	Tartu JK Tammeka	Tallinn
16:45	Mazur (yellow card) 10'; Natkho 32' (yellow card) 37'; Khomutov 33' (yellow card) 39'; Lobay 83', 89'; Veremeev (yellow card) 87'; Usta 90'	Report	Aloe (yellow card) 27'; Preiman 41', 44'; Uljanov (yellow card) 55'; Toomsalu (yellow card) 65'	Attendance: 44; Referee: Andrei Karhu

2 February 2020	FC Flora	0–0	JK Narva Trans	Tallinn
16:45	Välja (yellow card) 67'	Report	Elysée (yellow card) 10' (yellow card) 43' (yellow-red card); Bacanamwo (yellow card) 30'; Nesterovski (yellow card) 75'	Attendance: 62

7 February 2020	JK Narva Trans	1–1	FCI Levadia Tallinn	Tallinn
17:45	Novruzov (yellow card) 4'; Baniulis (yellow card) 47'; Sobtšenko 50'; Škinjov (yellow card) 62'; Ivanjušin (yellow card) 69'; Plotnikov (yellow card) 73'; Nesterovski (yellow card) 84'; Käos (yellow card) 89'	Report	Elhi (red card) 4'; Petrunin (yellow card) 64'; Lepistu 70'	Referee: Kristo Tohver

8 February 2020	Nõmme Kalju FC	0–2	FC Flora	Tallinn
15:00	Raudsepp (yellow card) 28'; Puri (yellow card) 29'; Veremeev (yellow card) 36'; Reintam (yellow card) 79'	Report	Avilov 32' (o.g.); Pürg 62'	Attendance: 50; Referee: Tanel Üprus

8 February 2020	Nõmme Kalju FC	0–2	FC Flora	Tallinn
15:00	Raudsepp (yellow card) 28'; Puri (yellow card) 29'; Veremeev (yellow card) 36'; Reintam (yellow card) 79'	Report	Avilov 32' (o.g.); Pürg 62'	Attendance: 50; Referee: Tanel Üprus

8 February 2020	Tartu JK Tammeka	1–2	Paide Linnameeskond	Tallinn
16:50	Dudarev (yellow card) 4'; Reinkort 10'; Preiman (yellow card) 19'; Maanas (yellow card) 40'; Veelma (yellow card) 50'	Report	Luts 57'; Piht 80'; Saliste (yellow card) 90'	Attendance: 68; Referee: Martti Pukk

== Group B ==
- Here participating teams ranked 7th to 10th in the Premium League, Premium leagues from 2nd league and transition teams.

Team	Pld	W	D	L	GF	GA	GD	Pts
FC Kuressaare	5	4	1	0	12	2	+10	13
Tallinna JK Legion	5	3	1	1	8	7	+1	10
Viljandi JK Tulevik	5	1	3	1	7	7	0	6
JK Tallinna Kalev	4	1	1	2	5	6	−1	4
Maardu Linnameeskond	5	1	1	3	2	6	−4	4
Pärnu JK Vaprus	5	0	3	2	3	8	−5	3
JK Tammeka Tartu	1	0	0	1	1	2	−1	0

== Group C ==
Team	Pld	W	D	L	GF	GA	GD	Pts
FC Elva	3	3	0	0	9	0	+9	9
FC Flora U21	3	2	0	1	10	9	+1	6
FCI Levadia U21	3	1	0	2	7	8	−1	3
Kohtla-Järve JK Järve	2	1	0	1	6	7	−1	3
Tartu JK Tammeka U21	1	0	0	1	2	3	−1	0
Rakvere JK Tarvas	2	0	0	2	3	8	−5	0

=== Group D ===
Team	Pld	W	D	L	GF	GA	GD	Pts
Pärnu Jalgpalliklubi	3	2	1	0	7	3	+4	7
Tartu JK Welco	3	1	2	0	8	4	+4	5
FC Nõmme United	3	1	1	1	10	9	+1	4
Nõmme Kalju FC U21	3	1	0	2	4	5	−1	3
JK Vaprus Vändra	3	1	0	2	6	8	−2	3
JK Tallinna Kalev U21	3	1	0	2	8	14	−6	3

== Group E ==
Team	Pld	W	D	L	GF	GA	GD	Pts
Paide Linnameeskond U21	2	2	0	0	6	0	+6	6
JK Tabasalu	3	2	0	1	7	4	+3	6
Läänemaa JK	2	1	1	0	8	4	+4	4
Viimsi JK	3	1	1	1	8	5	+3	4
Keila JK	3	1	0	2	9	12	−3	3
Võru FC Helios	3	0	0	3	3	16	−13	0

=== Group F ===
11 February 2020	Maardu Linnameeskond II	6–3	Tallinna JK Legion II	Tallinn
21:30		Report		Attendance: 30; Referee: Denis Petrov

=== Group G ===
10 February 2020	FC Flora U19	0–4	JK Piraaja Tallinn	Tallinn
21:30		Report		Attendance: 12; Referee: Revo Sirel

== Women ==
- This year was only one match.

26 January 2020	JK Tallinna Kalev	0–1	FC Flora	Tallinn
20:30	Šilina (yellow card) 53'; Rasmussen (yellow card) 70'; Pertel (yellow card) 89'	Report	Loo 28' (pen.)	Referee: Teet Allas

== Goalscorers ==
3 goals

- (Estonia) Otto-Robert Lipp

2 goals

- (Estonia) Sander Puri
- (Estonia) Joonas Soomre
- (Morocco) Selim El Aabchi

1 goal

- (Cameroon) Marcelin Gando
- (Estonia) Jevgeni Baranov
- (Estonia) Alger Džumadil
- (Estonia) Trevor Elhi
- (Estonia) Eduard Golovljov
- (Estonia) Vitali Gussev
- (Estonia) Peeter Klein
- (Estonia) Sander Laht
- (Estonia) Vadim Mihhailov
- (Estonia) Erki Mõttus
- (Estonia) Märten Opp
- (Estonia) Rainer Peips
- (Estonia) Albert Prosa
- (Estonia) Sten Reinkort
- (Estonia) Mark Oliver Roosnupp
- (Estonia) Raivo Saar
- (Estonia) Kristen Saarts
- (Estonia) Tauno Tekko
- (Estonia) Ronaldo Tiismaa
- (Estonia) Denis Vnukov
- (Russia) Semen Belyakov
- (Russia) Nikita Dronov

1 own goal

- (Estonia) Maksim Krivoshein
