= 2020 Baltic Cup =

International football competition

Tournament details
- Host country: Estonia; Latvia; Lithuania
- Dates: 1–10 June 2021
- Teams: 3
- Venue: 3 (in 3 host cities)

Final positions
- Champions: Estonia (4th title)
- Runners-up: Latvia
- Third place: Lithuania

Tournament statistics
- Matches played: 3
- Goals scored: 8 (2.67 per match)
- Top scorer(s): (Estonia) Mattias Käit (2 goals)

The 2020 Baltic Cup was the 28th Baltic Cup, an international football tournament contested by the Baltic states. Originally scheduled to be held in summer 2020, the tournament was postponed due to the COVID-19 pandemic and rescheduled for 1 to 10 June 2021, while retaining the name 2020 Baltic Cup. Estonia won their fourth title, and their first since 1938.

== Standings ==
Pos	Team	Pld	W	D	L	GF	GA	GD	Pts	
1	Estonia (C)	2	2	0	0	3	1	+2	6	Winners
2	Latvia	2	1	0	1	4	3	+1	3	
3	Lithuania	2	0	0	2	1	4	−3	0	

Source: Estonian Football Association
(C) Champions

== Matches ==
=== Lithuania vs. Estonia ===
1 June 2021
19:00 UTC+3

Lithuania	0–1	Estonia
	Report	Anier 59'

LFF Stadium, Vilnius
Attendance: 632
Referee: Aleksandrs Anufrijevs (Latvia)

Lithuania	Estonia

GK	12	Tomas Švedkauskas
RB	13	Saulius Mikoliūnas (c)	(yellow card) 90'
CB	5	Markas Beneta
CB	4	Edvinas Girdvainis
LB	8	Egidijus Vaitkūnas
CM	2	Martynas Dapkus		(substituted off) 69'
CM	20	Domantas Šimkus
RW	11	Arvydas Novikovas
AM	6	Tautvydas Eliošius		(substituted off) 46'
LW	17	Justas Lasickas	(yellow card) 30'	(substituted off) 59'
CF	9	Karolis Laukžemis		(substituted off) 69'
Substitutes:
MF	19	Donatas Kazlauskas		(substituted on) 46'
FW	22	Fedor Černych		(substituted on) 59'
MF	15	Deimantas Petravičius		(substituted on) 69'
MF	26	Ovidijus Verbickas		(substituted on) 69'
Manager:
(Lithuania) Valdas Urbonas

GK	1	Matvei Igonen
RB	9	Vlasiy Sinyavskiy		(substituted off) 56'
CB	16	Joonas Tamm	(yellow card) 15'
CB	2	Märten Kuusk
CB	25	Maksim Paskotši		(substituted off) 68'
LM	3	Artur Pikk
CM	14	Konstantin Vassiljev (c)
CM	5	Vladislav Kreida		(substituted off) 68'
CM	4	Mattias Käit
CF	15	Rauno Sappinen		(substituted off) 87'
CF	8	Henri Anier		(substituted off) 87'
Substitutes:
MF	7	Sander Puri	(yellow card) 83'	(substituted on) 56'
DF	18	Karol Mets		(substituted on) 68'
MF	6	Markus Soomets		(substituted on) 68'
MF	21	Bogdan Vaštšuk		(substituted on) 87'
FW	19	Robert Kirss		(substituted on) 87'
Manager:
(Switzerland) Thomas Häberli

=== Latvia vs. Lithuania ===
4 June 2021
19:00 UTC+3

Latvia	3–1	Lithuania
Beneta 37' (o.g.); Emsis 69'; Uldriķis 85'	Report	Golubickas 67'

Daugava Stadium, Riga
Attendance: 0
Referee: Juri Frischer (Estonia)

Latvia	Lithuania

GK	12	Roberts Ozols
RB	11	Roberts Savaļnieks
CB	5	Antonijs Černomordijs
CB	3	Mārcis Ošs
LB	13	Raivis Jurkovskis		(substituted off) 61'
CM	21	Krišs Kārkliņš		(substituted off) 73'
CM	8	Eduards Emsis
RW	16	Alvis Jaunzems		(substituted off) 37'
AM	17	Artūrs Zjuzins		(substituted off) 62'
LW	14	Andrejs Cigaņiks	(yellow card) 49'	(substituted off) 62'
CF	20	Roberts Uldriķis
Substitutes:
MF	9	Jānis Ikaunieks		(substituted on) 37'
DF	2	Vitālijs Maksimenko		(substituted on) 61'
MF	15	Vladislavs Fjodorovs		(substituted on) 62'
FW	19	Raimonds Krollis		(substituted on) 62'
MF	24	Aleksejs Saveljevs		(substituted on) 73'
Manager:
(Latvia) Dainis Kazakevičs

GK	12	Tomas Švedkauskas
RB	13	Saulius Mikoliūnas (c)	(substituted off) 56'
CB	5	Markas Beneta
CB	4	Edvinas Girdvainis
LB	8	Egidijus Vaitkūnas
CM	17	Justas Lasickas	(substituted off) 46'
CM	2	Martynas Dapkus	(substituted off) 56'
CM	20	Domantas Šimkus	(substituted off) 65'
AM	11	Arvydas Novikovas	(substituted off) 76'
AM	26	Ovidijus Verbickas
FW	22	Fedor Černych	(substituted off) 56'
Substitutes:
MF	10	Paulius Golubickas	(substituted on) 46'
DF	3	Vytas Gašpuitis	(substituted on) 56'
DF	14	Linas Mėgelaitis	(substituted on) 56'
MF	15	Deimantas Petravičius	(substituted on) 56'
MF	19	Donatas Kazlauskas	(substituted on) 65'
FW	9	Karolis Laukžemis	(substituted on) 76'
Manager:
(Lithuania) Valdas Urbonas

=== Estonia vs. Latvia ===
10 June 2021
19:00 UTC+3

Estonia	2–1	Latvia
Käit 5', 40'	Report	Ikaunieks 84' (pen.)

Lilleküla Stadium, Tallinn
Attendance: 740
Referee: Robertas Valikonis (Lithuania)

Estonia	Latvia

GK	12	Karl Hein
RB	18	Karol Mets	(yellow card) 66'
CB	16	Joonas Tamm	(yellow card) 69'
CB	2	Märten Kuusk		(substituted off) 27'
LB	3	Artur Pikk	(yellow card) 80'
RM	14	Konstantin Vassiljev (c)		(substituted off) 49'
CM	7	Sander Puri		(substituted off) 85'
CM	5	Vladislav Kreida
LM	4	Mattias Käit		(substituted off) 49'
CF	15	Rauno Sappinen		(substituted off) 85'
CF	8	Henri Anier	(yellow card) 90+4'
Substitutes:
DF	25	Maksim Paskotši	(yellow card) 83'	(substituted on) 27'
MF	20	Markus Poom	(yellow card) 84'	(substituted on) 49'
MF	21	Bogdan Vaštšuk		(substituted on) 49'
DF	24	Henrik Pürg		(substituted on) 85'
FW	11	Henrik Ojamaa		(substituted on) 85'
Manager:
(Switzerland) Thomas Häberli

GK	12	Roberts Ozols
RB	15	Vladislavs Fjodorovs		(substituted off) 64'
CB	4	Kaspars Dubra (c)
CB	3	Mārcis Ošs	(yellow card) 18'
LB	13	Raivis Jurkovskis		(substituted off) 61'
CM	8	Eduards Emsis
CM	24	Aleksejs Saveljevs	(yellow card) 45+1'	(substituted off) 46'
RW	11	Roberts Savaļnieks		(substituted off) 86'
AM	17	Artūrs Zjuzins		(substituted off) 46'
LW	14	Andrejs Cigaņiks		(substituted off) 77'
CF	20	Roberts Uldriķis
Substitutes:
DF	21	Krišs Kārkliņš		(substituted on) 46'
FW	19	Raimonds Krollis	(yellow card) 88'	(substituted on) 46'
DF	22	Vladislavs Sorokins		(substituted on) 61'
MF	16	Alvis Jaunzems	(yellow card) 79'	(substituted on) 64'
FW	9	Dāvis Ikaunieks		(substituted on) 77'
DF	6	Elvis Stuglis		(substituted on) 86'
Manager:
(Latvia) Dainis Kazakevičs

== Winners ==
2020 Baltic Football Cup winners

Estonia
Fourth title

== Statistics ==
=== Goalscorers ===
There were 8 goals scored in 3 matches, for an average of 2.67 goals per match.

2 goals

- (Estonia) Mattias Käit

1 goal

- (Estonia) Henri Anier
- (Latvia) Eduards Emsis
- (Latvia) Davis Ikaunieks
- (Latvia) Roberts Uldriķis
- (Lithuania) Paulius Golubickas

1 own goal

- (Lithuania) Markas Beneta (against Latvia)
