= 2021 Estonian Supercup =

Estonian football competition

- Event: Estonian Supercup
Flora	Paide
1	0
- Date: 5 March 2021
- Venue: Sportland Arena, Tallinn, Estonia
- Referee: Karl Koppel
- Attendance: 0

The 2021 Estonian Supercup was the 26th edition of the annual football match played between the winners of the previous season's Meistriliiga and the previous season's Estonian Cup respectively. As Flora won both competitions in 2020, their opponents were the 2020 Meistriliiga runners-up, Paide.

The match was played at the Lilleküla Stadium on 5 March 2021. Flora defended the trophy they won in 2019, winning 1–0, with the only goal coming in the 52nd minute and was scored by Rauno Sappinen. It was Flora's 11th overall title in the competition, four more than any other club.

== Match ==
=== Details ===
5 March 2021
13:00 EET

Flora	1–0	Paide
Sappinen 52'	Report

Sportland Arena, Tallinn
Attendance: 0
Referee: Karl Koppel

FLORA:
GK	32	(Estonia) Matvei Igonen
DF	2	(Estonia) Märten Kuusk
DF	27	(Estonia) Michael Lilander
DF	43	(Estonia) Markkus Seppik
DF	26	(Estonia) Kristo Hussar
MF	14	(Estonia) Konstantin Vassiljev
MF	10	(Estonia) Martin Miller
MF	21	(Estonia) Rocco Robert Shein
FW	8	(Estonia) Henrik Ojamaa		(substituted off) 84'
FW	9	(Estonia) Rauno Alliku	(yellow card) 90'
FW	11	(Estonia) Rauno Sappinen
Substitutes:
FW	7	(Estonia) Sten Reinkort		(substituted in) 84'
FW	22	(Estonia) Taaniel Usta
MF	23	(Estonia) Henri Välja
DF	24	(Estonia) Henrik Pürg
MF	28	(Estonia) Markus Soomets
GK	31	(Estonia) Karl-Romet Nõmm
DF	54	(Estonia) Mathias Palts
Manager:
(Estonia) Jürgen Henn

PAIDE:
GK	73	(Estonia) Mait Toom
DF	25	(Estonia) Hindrek Ojamaa	(yellow card) 90+2'
DF	29	(Estonia) Joseph Saliste
DF	12	(Ghana) Abdul Yusif
MF	15	(Estonia) Sander Sinilaid
MF	16	(Estonia) Sergei Mošnikov		(substituted off) 85'
MF	10	(Estonia) Andre Frolov
MF	33	(Estonia) Karl Mööl
FW	8	(Estonia) Henri Anier
FW	17	(Estonia) Raimond Eino		(substituted off) 67'
FW	31	(Netherlands) Deabeas Owusu-Sekyere	(yellow card) 89'
Substitutes:
DF	11	(Mali) Hadji Dramé		(substituted in) 67'
FW	18	(Senegal) Sekou Camara		(substituted in) 85'
GK	1	(Estonia) Mihkel Aksalu
DF	14	(Estonia) Martin Kase
DF	26	(Estonia) Siim Aer
MF	80	(Estonia) Kevor Palumets
Manager:
(Estonia) Vjatšeslav Zahovaiko

Assistant referees:
Riivo Stolts
Raul Kaivoja

== See also ==
- 2020 Meistriliiga
- 2019–20 Estonian Cup
