= Ebrima Jarju =

Gambian footballer (born 1998)

Personal information
- Date of birth: 16 March 1998 (age 28)
- Place of birth: The Gambia
- Position: Goalkeeper

Team information
- Current team: Paide
- Number: 99

Youth career
- Lamin United

Senior career*
Years	Team	Apps	(Gls)
–2022	Real de Banjul		
2022	→ Paide (loan)	18	(0)
2023–2026	Paide	114	(0)

International career^{‡}
2024–	Gambia	9	(0)
- * Club domestic league appearances and goals as of 17 November 2026 ‡ National team caps and goals as of 9 June 2025

Ebrima Jarju (born 16 March 1998) is a Gambian professional footballer who plays as a goalkeeper for Paide.

== Early life ==
Jarju was born on 16 March 1998 in The Gambia and has a brother. Growing up, he regarded Spain international David de Gea as his football idol.

== Club career ==
As a youth player, Jarju joined the youth academy of Gambian side Lamin United. Following his stint there, he started his career with Gambian side Real de Banjul, where he captained the club.

Ahead of the 2022 season, he signed for Estonian side Paide, helping the club win the 2021–22 Estonian Cup.

== International career ==
Jarju is a Gambia international. During October and November 2024, he played for the Gambia national football team for 2025 Africa Cup of Nations qualification.

== Honours ==
Individual

- Meistriliiga Player of the Month: June/July 2023
- Meistriliiga Goalkeeper of the Season: 2022
