= Artur Pikk =

Estonian footballer (born 1993)

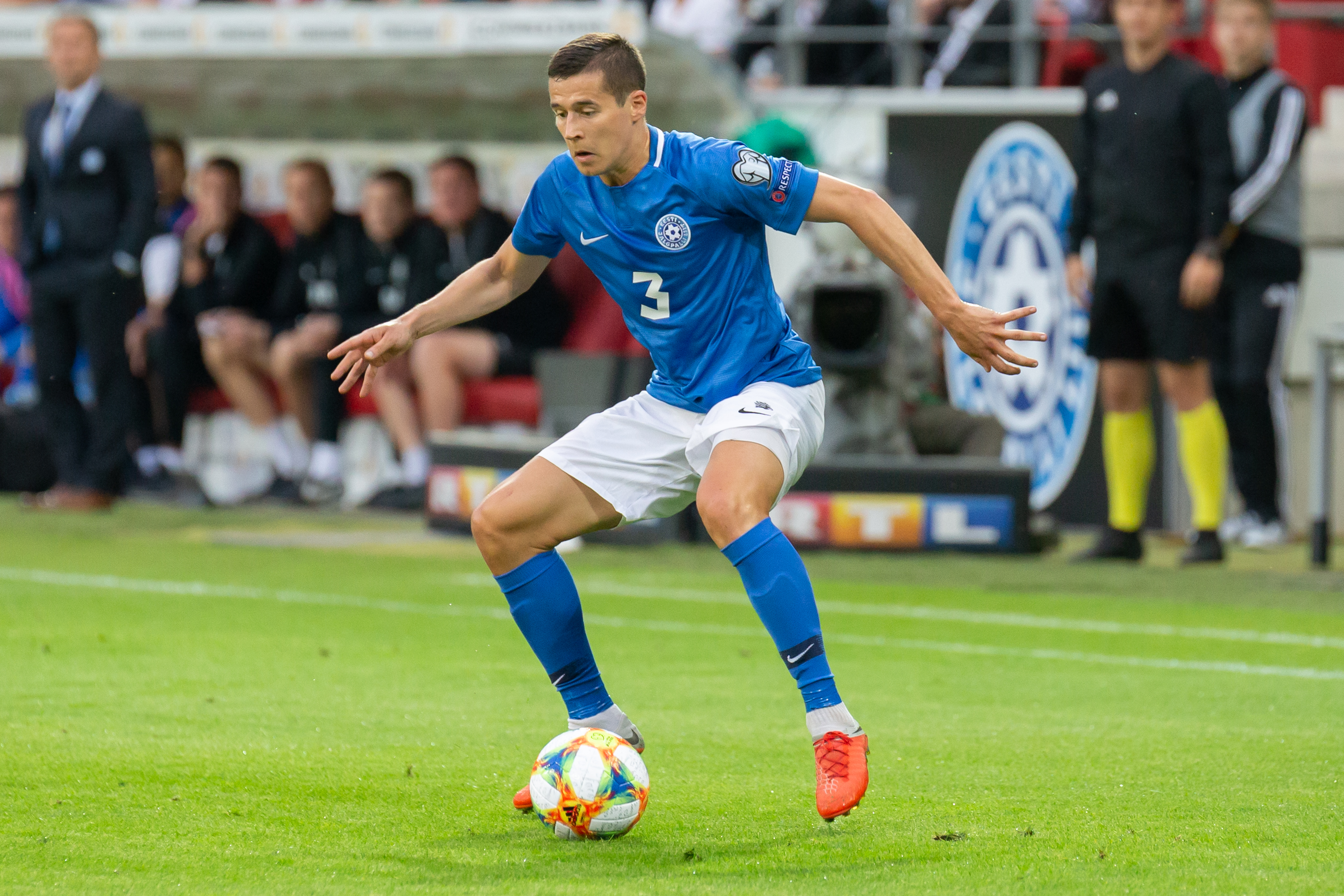
- Pikk playing for Estonia in 2019

Personal information
- Full name: Artur Pikk
- Date of birth: 5 March 1993 (age 33)
- Place of birth: Tartu, Estonia
- Height: 1.80 m (5 ft 11 in)
- Position: Left-back

Youth career
- 2005–2008: Velldoris
- 2008: Warrior
- 2009: Flora Rakvere
- 2009–2010: Levadia

Senior career*
Years	Team	Apps	(Gls)
2009–2015	Levadia	109	(7)
2013	Levadia II	1	(1)
2009–2010	→ HaServ (loan)	35	(3)
2011–2012	→ Tammeka (loan)	39	(1)
2016–2017	BATE Borisov	20	(0)
2017–2018	Ružomberok	17	(0)
2018–2020	Miedź Legnica	50	(3)
2020	KuPS	8	(0)
2021	Diósgyőr	7	(0)
2021	RFS	6	(0)
2022	FCI Levadia	33	(1)
2023–2025	Odra Opole	40	(1)

International career^{‡}
2009	Estonia U17	11	(0)
2010	Estonia U18	3	(0)
2010–2012	Estonia U19	13	(0)
2013–2014	Estonia U21	14	(0)
2014–	Estonia	62	(1)
- * Club domestic league appearances and goals as of 16 December 2024 ‡ National team caps and goals as of 9 September 2024

Artur Pikk (born 5 March 1993) is an Estonian professional footballer who plays as a left-back for the Estonia national team.

== Club career ==
=== Levadia ===
Levadia acquired Pikk's player rights in 2009. In 2011, he joined Tammeka on a one-and-a-half year loan. Pikk made his debut in the Meistriliiga on 2 April 2011, in a 1–1 home draw against Narva Trans. He made 39 appearances and scored one goal for Tammeka before returning to Levadia. Pikk made his debut for Levadia on 23 July 2012, in a 6–0 away win over Tallinna Kalev. He helped the team win the league title in the 2013 season. On 15 December 2013, Pikk signed a contract extension with Levadia until 2015. He helped the club to their second successive Meistriliiga title in the 2014 season.

=== BATE Borisov ===
On 23 February 2016, Pikk signed a three-year contract with Belarusian champions BATE Borisov. He won the 2016 Belarusian Super Cup on his debut for the club. Pikk helped BATE Borisov win their 11th successive Belarusian Premier League title in the 2016 season. On 30 August 2017, his contract was terminated.

=== Ružomberok ===
On 17 October 2017, Pikk signed with Fortuna Liga club Ružomberok until May 2018.

=== Miedź Legnica ===
On 11 July 2018, Pikk signed for Ekstraklasa club Miedź Legnica on a two-year deal.

=== KuPS ===
In late August 2020, Pikk joined Finnish Veikkausliiga club Kuopion Palloseura (KuPS) on a deal for the rest of the 2020 season.

== International career ==
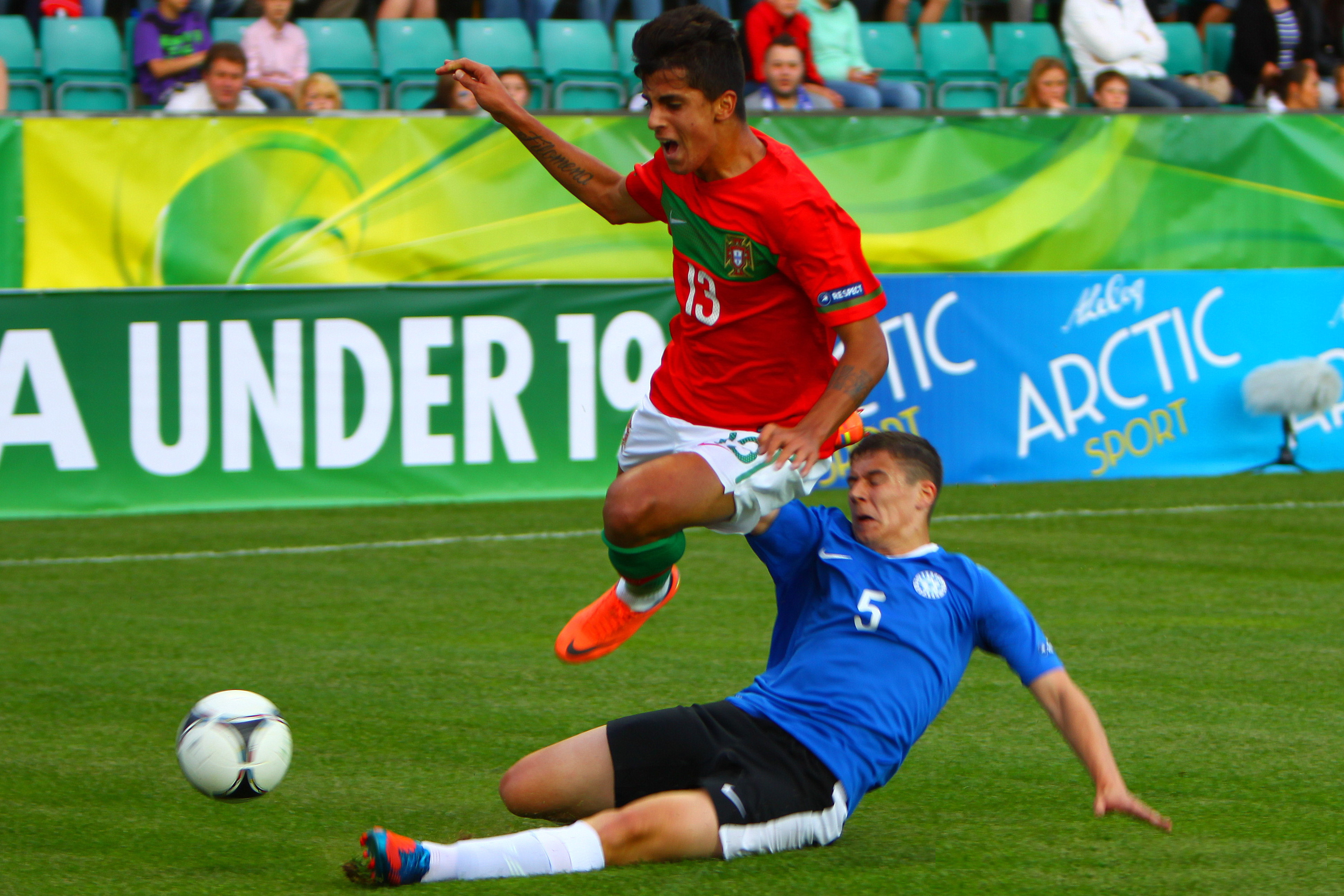
Pikk tackles Portugal's João Cancelo at the 2012 UEFA European Under-19 Championship

Pikk has represented Estonia at under-17, under-18, under-19 and under-21 levels. He was named in the Estonia under-19 squad for the 2012 UEFA European Under-19 Championship in Estonia. Pikk played in every group stage match, but failed to help the team progress to the semi-finals as Estonia lost all three games against Portugal, Greece and Spain.

Pikk made his senior international debut for Estonia on 7 June 2014, in a 2–1 home win over Tajikistan in a friendly. He made his first start for Estonia on 12 October 2014, in a UEFA Euro 2016 qualifying match against England while performing his compulsory military service in the Estonian Defence Forces. The match ended in a 0–1 loss. Pikk scored his first international goal on 11 November 2015, in a 3–0 home win over Georgia in a friendly.

== Career statistics ==
=== Club ===
As of match played 29 November 2024

Appearances and goals by club, season and competition
Club	Season	League			National cup (Note: Includes the Estonian Cup, Belarusian Cup, Slovak Cup, Polish Cup, Magyar Kupa and Latvian Football Cup)		Europe		Other		Total	
Club	Season	Division	Apps	Goals	Apps	Goals	Apps	Goals	Apps	Goals	Apps	Goals
Levadia	2012	Meistriliiga	16	3	2	0	1 (Note: Appearance(s) in UEFA Europa League)	0	—		19	3
Levadia	2013	Meistriliiga	31	1	2	0	4	0	1 (Note: Appearance in Estonian Supercup)	0	38	1
Levadia	2014	Meistriliiga	33	2	3	0	4 (Note: Appearances in UEFA Champions League)	0	1	0	41	2
Levadia	2015	Meistriliiga	29	1	3	0	2	0	1	0	35	1
Levadia	Total		109	7	10	0	11	0	3	0	133	7
Levadia II	2013	Esiliiga	1	1	—		—		—		1	1
HaServ (loan)	2009	III liiga	16	1	1	0	—		4 (Note: Appearances in Estonian Small Cup)	0	21	1
HaServ (loan)	2010	II liiga	19	2	3	0	—		4	3	26	5
HaServ (loan)	Total		35	3	4	0	—		8	3	47	6
Tammeka (loan)	2011	Meistriliiga	27	1	2	0	—		—		29	1
Tammeka (loan)	2012	Meistriliiga	12	0	0	0	—		—		12	0
Tammeka (loan)	Total		39	1	2	0	—		—		41	1
Tammeka II (loan)	2011	II liiga	0	0	0	0	—		1 (Note: Appearance in II liiga play-offs)	1	1	1
BATE Borisov	2016	Belarusian Premier League	17	0	4	0	5 (Note: Four appearances in UEFA Champions League, one appearance in UEFA Europa League)	0	1 (Note: Appearance in Belarusian Super Cup)	0	27	0
BATE Borisov	2017	Belarusian Premier League	3	0	1	0	0	0	0	0	4	0
BATE Borisov	Total		20	0	5	0	5	0	1	0	31	0
Ružomberok	2017–18	Slovak Super Liga	17	0	4	1	0	0	—		21	1
Miedź Legnica	2018–19	Ekstraklasa	21	1	3	0	—		—		24	1
Miedź Legnica	2019–20	I liga	28	2	2	0	—		1 (Note: Appearance in I liga promotion play-offs)	0	31	2
Miedź Legnica	Total		49	3	5	0	—		1	0	55	3
KuPS	2020	Veikkausliiga	8	0	—		3	0	—		11	0
Diósgyőri	2020–21	Nemzeti Bajnokság I	7	0	1	0	—		—		8	0
RFS	2021	Virsliga	6	0	1	0	3 (Note: Appearances in UEFA Europa Conference League)	0	—		10	0
Levadia	2022	Meistriliiga	33	1	1	0	3 (Note: One appearance in UEFA Champions League, Two appearances in UEFA Europa Conference League)	0	1	0	38	1
Odra Opole	2022–23	I liga	11	1	—		—		—		11	1
Odra Opole	2023–24	I liga	17	0	1	0	—		1	0	19	0
Odra Opole	2024–25	I liga	11	0	0	0	—		—		11	0
Odra Opole	Total		39	1	1	0	—		1	0	41	1
Career total			363	17	34	1	25	0	15	4	438	22

=== International ===
As of match played 8 September 2024

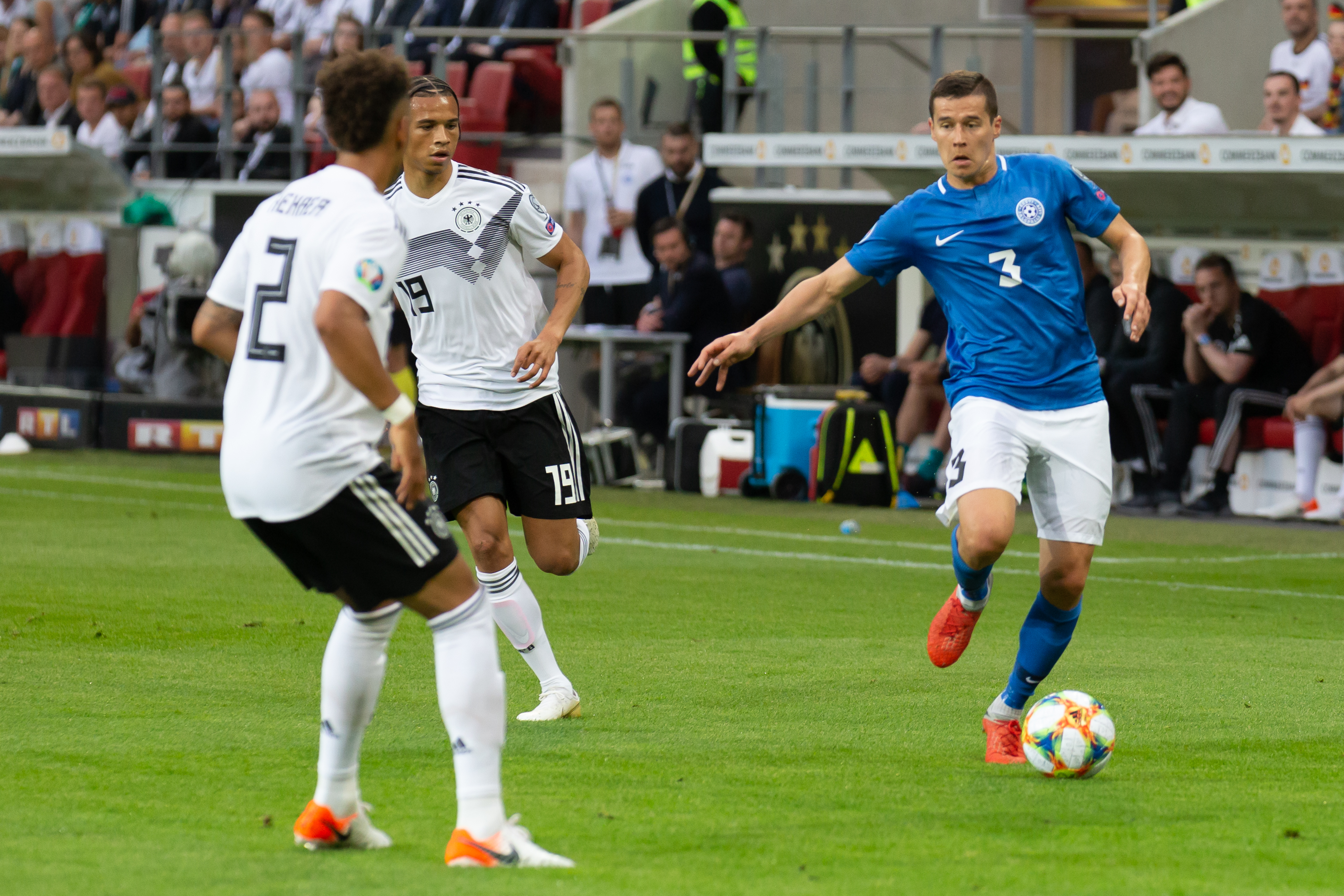
Pikk playing for Estonia against Germany in 2019

Appearances and goals by national team and year
National team	Year	Apps	Goals
Estonia
Estonia	2014	3	0
Estonia	2015	7	1
Estonia	2016	7	0
Estonia	2017	6	0
Estonia	2018	7	0
Estonia	2019	6	0
Estonia	2020	5	0
Estonia	2021	6	0
Estonia	2022	1	0
Estonia	2023	8	0
Estonia	2024	6	0
Total		62	1

As of match played 20 July 2019. Estonia score listed first, score column indicates score after each Pikk goal.

List of international goals scored by Artur Pikk
No.	Date	Venue	Cap	Opponent	Score	Result	Competition
1	11 November 2015	A. Le Coq Arena, Tallinn, Estonia	9	Georgia	2–0	3–0	Friendly

== Honours ==
HaServ

- Estonian Small Cup: 2009

Levadia

- Meistriliiga: 2013, 2014
- Estonian Cup: 2013–14
- Estonian Supercup: 2013, 2022

BATE Borisov

- Belarusian Premier League: 2016, 2017
- Belarusian Super Cup: 2016

RFS

- Latvian Higher League: 2021
- Latvian Football Cup: 2021

Estonia

- Baltic Cup: 2020, 2024
