= Erko Jonne Tõugjas =

Estonian footballer (born 2003)

Personal information
- Full name: Erko Jonne Tõugjas
- Date of birth: 5 July 2003 (age 23)
- Place of birth: Tallinn, Estonia
- Height: 1.92 m (6 ft 3 1/2 in)
- Position: Centre-back

Team information
- Current team: Halmstads BK
- Number: 16

Youth career
- 2010–2011: Oper academy
- 2012–2020: Nõmme United

Senior career*
| Years | Team | Apps | (Gls) |
| 2019–2021 | Nõmme United | 53 | (5) |
| 2021–2023 | Flora U21 | 27 | (1) |
| 2021–2025 | Flora | 80 | (8) |
| 2022 | → Legion U21 (loan) | 2 | (0) |
| 2022 | → Legion (loan) | 14 | (1) |
| 2026- | Halmstads BK | 11 | (0) |

International career^{‡}
| 2018 | Estonia U16 | 2 | (0) |
| 2019 | Estonia U17 | 11 | (0) |
| 2021 | Estonia U19 | 5 | (0) |
| 2022– | Estonia U21 | 1 | (0) |
| 2023– | Estonia | 13 | (0) |
- * Club domestic league appearances and goals as of 9 July 2026 ‡ National team caps and goals as of 16 November 2026

Erko Jonne Tõugjas (born 5 July 2003) is an Estonian professional footballer who plays as a centre-back for Allsvenskan club Halmstads BK and the Estonia national team.

== International career ==
Tõugjas made his senior international debut for Estonia on 8 January 2023, in a 1–1 draw against Iceland in a friendly.

== Honours ==
=== Club ===
Nõmme United

- Esiliiga B: 2019

Flora

- Estonian Supercup: 2021
