= Rauno Alliku =

Estonian footballer (born 1990)

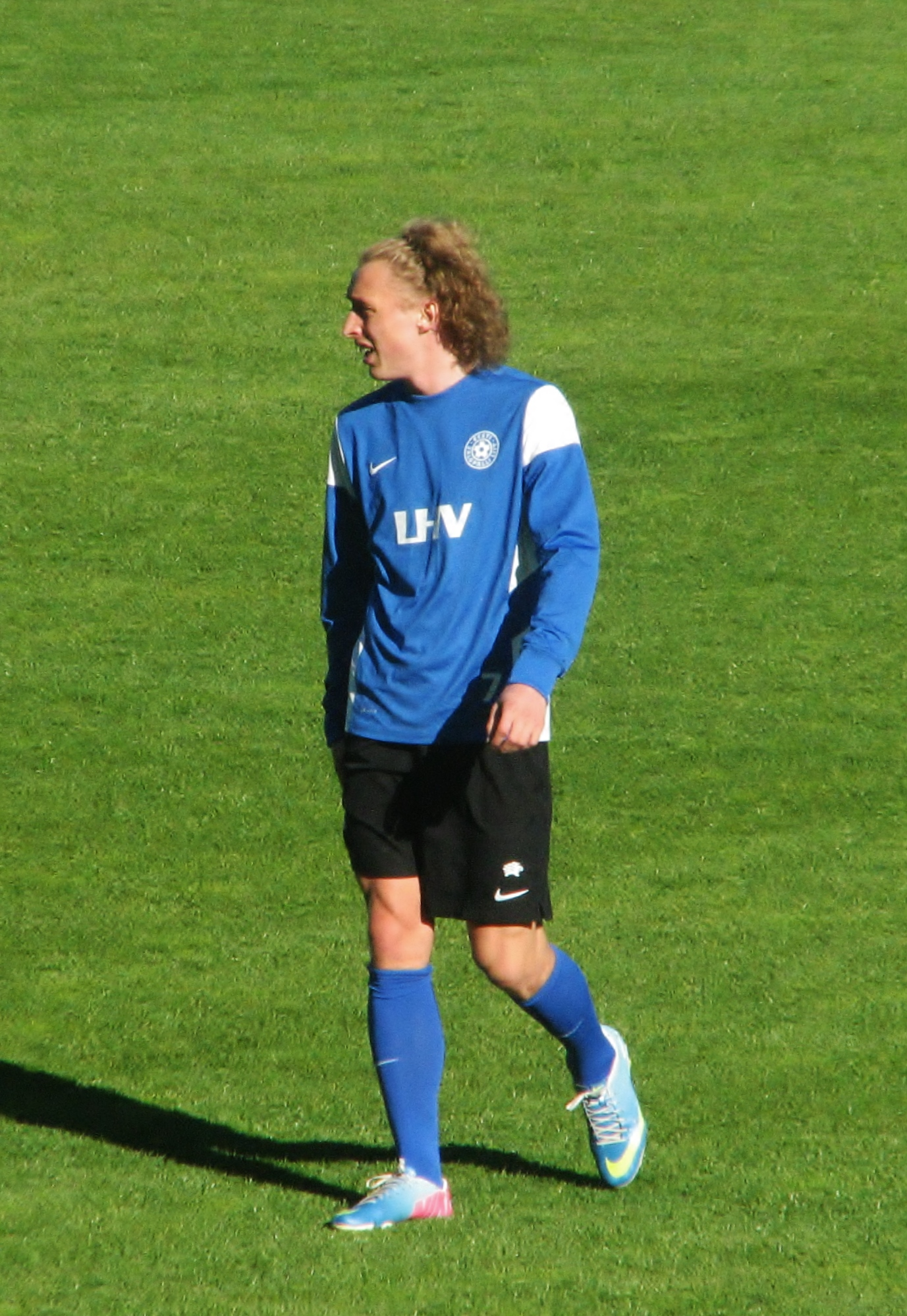
- Alliku with Estonia in 2015

Personal information
- Full name: Rauno Alliku
- Date of birth: 2 March 1990 (age 36)
- Place of birth: Paikuse, then part of Estonian SSR, Soviet Union
- Height: 1.81 m (5 ft 11 in)
- Position: Forward

Team information
- Current team: Flora
- Number: 9

Youth career
- 2002–2005: Tervis Pärnu
- 2006–2007: Pärnu Kalev
- 2008: Flora

Senior career*
Years	Team	Apps	(Gls)
2006–2008	Pärnu Kalev	43	(40)
2008–	Flora	467	(121)
2008–2009	→ Vaprus (loan)	21	(7)
2009	→ Tulevik (loan)	19	(6)
2010–2012	Flora II	6	(2)

International career^{‡}
2007–2009	Estonia U19	18	(3)
2009–2012	Estonia U21	22	(1)
2010–2013	Estonia U23	2	(0)
2010–2021	Estonia	10	(0)
- * Club domestic league appearances and goals as of 17 November 2026 ‡ National team caps and goals as of 17 April 2023

Rauno Alliku (born 2 March 1990) is an Estonian professional footballer who plays as a forward for Meistriliiga club Flora.

== Club career ==
=== Flora ===
On 31 July 2008, Alliku signed for Flora and was immediately sent on loan to Vaprus, where he played until June 2009. He was then loaned to Flora affiliated Meistriliiga club Tulevik. Alliku won his first Meistriliiga title with Flora in the 2010 season. He won his second league title in the 2011 season, and a third one in the 2015 season.

== International career ==
Alliku started his international youth career in 2008. In December 2010, he was named by the Estonia national football team manager Tarmo Rüütli in the Estonia squad to face China and Qatar. He made his debut on 18 December 2010, starting against China.

== Honours ==
=== Club ===
Flora

- Meistriliiga: 2010, 2011, 2015, 2017, 2019, 2020, 2022, 2023, 2025
- Estonian Cup: 2010–11, 2012–13, 2015–16, 2019–20, 2025–26
- Estonian Supercup: 2011, 2012, 2014, 2016, 2020, 2021, 2024

=== Individual ===
- Meistriliiga Player of the Month: September 2021
