= 2022 Meistriliiga =

31st season of the Meistriliiga

Meistriliiga
- Season: 2022
- Dates: 1 March 2022 – 12 November 2022
- Champions: Flora; 14th Meistriliiga title 14th Estonian title
- Relegated: Legion
- Champions League: Flora
- Europa Conference League: FCI Levadia; Paide Linnameeskond; Narva Trans (via Estonian Cup)
- Matches: 180
- Goals: 549 (3.05 per match)
- Top goalscorer: Zakaria Beglarishvili (21 goals)
- Biggest home win: Paide Linnameeskond 10–0 Legion (18 September 2022)
- Biggest away win: Vaprus 0–8 FCI Levadia (5 March 2022)
- Highest scoring: Paide Linnameeskond 10–0 Legion (18 September 2022)
- Longest winning run: 11 matches Flora
- Longest unbeaten run: 31 matches Flora
- Longest winless run: 19 matches Vaprus
- Longest losing run: 13 matches Vaprus
- Highest attendance: 1978; Vaprus 1–1 Tammeka (2 July 2022)
- Lowest attendance: 61; Narva Trans 0–2 Tammeka (12 March 2022)

The 2022 Meistriliiga, also known as A. Le Coq Premium Liiga due to sponsorship reasons, was the 32nd season of the Meistriliiga, the top Estonian league for association football clubs since its establishment in 1992. The season started on 1 March 2022 and concluded on 12 November 2022.

Flora won their 14th Meistriliiga title with five games to spare.

== Teams ==
=== Stadiums and locations ===
Locations of the 2022 Meistriliiga teams

Team	Location	Stadium	Capacity
FCI Levadia	Tallinn	A. Le Coq Arena	14,336
Flora	Tallinn	A. Le Coq Arena	14,336
Kuressaare	Kuressaare	Kuressaare linnastaadion	1,000
Legion	Tallinn	Sportland Arena	1,161
Narva Trans	Narva	Narva Kreenholm Stadium	1,065
Nõmme Kalju	Tallinn	Sportland Arena	1,161
Paide Linnameeskond	Paide	Paide linnastaadion	500
Tallinna Kalev	Tallinn	Kadriorg Stadium	5,000
Tammeka	Tartu	Tartu Tamme Stadium	1,500
Vaprus	Pärnu	Pärnu Rannastaadion	1,501

=== Personnel and kits ===
Team	Manager	Captain	Kit manufacturer	Shirt sponsor
FCI Levadia	(Russia) Nikita Andreev (interim)	(Estonia) Brent Lepistu	Adidas	Admirals, Viimsi Keevitus
Flora	(Estonia) Jürgen Henn	(Estonia) Konstantin Vassiljev	Nike	Optibet
Kuressaare	(Ukraine) Roman Kozhukhovskyi	(Estonia) Sander Seeman	Nike	
Legion	(Estonia) Denis Belov	(Estonia) Aleksandr Volodin	Uhlsport	
Narva Trans	(Russia) Aleksei Yagudin (interim)	(Ivory Coast) Irié	Nike	Sportland
Nõmme Kalju	(Estonia) Kaido Koppel (interim)	(Greece) Giannis Tsivelekidis	Adidas	Rämmar
Paide Linnameeskond	(Estonia) Karel Voolaid	(Estonia) Andre Frolov	Nike	Exmet, Verston
Tallinna Kalev	(Estonia) Aivar Anniste (Estonia) Daniel Meijel	(Estonia) Tanel Tamberg	Macron	Coolbet
Tammeka	(Estonia) Marti Pähn	(Estonia) Karl Johan Pechter	Nike	
Vaprus	(Latvia) Dmitrijs Kalašņikovs	(Estonia) Magnus Villota	Nike	Coolbet

=== Managerial changes ===
Team	Outgoing manager	Manner of departure	Date of vacancy	Position in the table	Incoming manager	Date of appointment
Paide Linnameeskond	(Estonia) Vjatšeslav Zahovaiko	End of contract	28 November 2021	Pre-season	(Estonia) Karel Voolaid	6 December 2021
Vaprus	(Estonia) Taavi Midenbritt	End of contract	29 November 2021	Pre-season	(Latvia) Dmitrijs Kalašņikovs	27 December 2021
Narva Trans	(Russia) Igor Pyvin	End of contract	29 November 2021	Pre-season	(Russia) Aleksei Eremenko	30 November 2021
Tammeka	(Latvia) Dmitrijs Kalašņikovs	End of contract	7 December 2021	Pre-season	(Portugal) Miguel Santos	4 January 2022
Nõmme Kalju	(Russia) Sergei Frantsev	Sacked	8 December 2021	Pre-season	(Portugal) Eddie Cardoso	4 January 2022
FCI Levadia	(Serbia) Marko Savić (Estonia) Vladimir Vassiljev	Resigned	1 July 2022	1st	(Serbia) Ivan Stojković	1 July 2022
Tammeka	(Portugal) Miguel Santos	Resigned	9 July 2022	6th	(Estonia) Marti Pähn	9 July 2022
FCI Levadia	(Serbia) Ivan Stojković	Sacked	12 September 2022	2nd	(Ukraine) Maksym Kalynychenko	12 September 2022
FCI Levadia	(Ukraine) Maksym Kalynychenko	Sacked	22 September 2022	2nd	(Russia) Nikita Andreev (interim)	22 September 2022
Nõmme Kalju	(Portugal) Eddie Cardoso	Sacked	16 October 2022	4th	(Estonia) Kaido Koppel (interim)	16 October 2022
Narva Trans	(Russia) Aleksei Eremenko	Mutual consent	12 November 2022	7th	(Russia) Aleksei Yagudin (interim)	12 November 2022

== League table ==
Pos	Team	Pld	W	D	L	GF	GA	GD	Pts	Qualification or relegation
1	Flora (C)	36	31	4	1	94	21	+73	97	Qualification for the Champions League first qualifying round
2	FCI Levadia	36	24	7	5	74	25	+49	79	Qualification for the Europa Conference League first qualifying round
3	Paide Linnameeskond	36	19	8	9	84	37	+47	65	Qualification for the Europa Conference League first qualifying round
4	Nõmme Kalju	36	19	8	9	59	30	+29	65	
5	Kuressaare	36	13	11	12	49	51	−2	50	
6	Tammeka	36	10	9	17	38	57	−19	39	
7	Narva Trans	36	10	8	18	43	58	−15	38	Qualification for the Europa Conference League first qualifying round (Note: Narva Trans qualified for the Europa Conference League first qualifying round as the 2022–23 Estonian Cup winners.)
8	Tallinna Kalev	36	10	5	21	42	92	−50	35	
9	Legion (R)	36	6	8	22	34	82	−48	22 (Note: Legion were deducted four points for failing to comply with club licensing procedures.)	Relegation to the Esiliiga (Note: Despite winning the relegation play-offs, Legion gave up its place in the Meistriliiga and applied to join the Esiliiga for the following season.)
10	Vaprus	36	3	2	31	32	96	−64	11	Reprieved from relegation (Note: As a result of Legion's withdrawal from the next season of the Meistriliiga, Vaprus was able to maintain its spot.)

Updated to match(es) played on 6 November 2022. Source: Premium Liiga, Soccerway
Rules for classification: 1) Points; 2) Less matches awarded against; 3) Head-to-head points; 4) Head-to-head goal difference; 5) Matches won; 6) Goal difference; 7) Goals scored; 8) Away goals scored; 9) Fair-play points; 10) Draw
(C) Champions; (R) Relegated

== Results ==
=== First half of season ===
Home \ Away	FLO	KAL	KUR	LEG	LEV	NAR	NÕM	PLM	TAM	VAP
Flora	—	7–1	4–0	2–0	2–0	1–0	2–0	0–0	3–2	6–1
Tallinna Kalev	2–4	—	0–3	2–2	0–1	5–2	0–3	0–3	1–0	1–0
Kuressaare	0–3	1–0	—	1–0	1–1	1–2	1–1	2–1	3–0	3–2
Legion	0–7	1–1	2–2	—	1–3	0–2	2–4	1–2	1–1	3–0
FCI Levadia	1–1	5–1	1–0	2–0	—	6–0	1–1	1–0	4–0	4–1
Narva Trans	0–3	5–0	0–1	2–1	0–1	—	2–1	1–2	0–2	3–1
Nõmme Kalju	1–2	2–1	2–0	3–0	0–1	3–0	—	1–0	3–1	2–0
Paide	1–2	7–0	1–1	5–0	0–1	4–2	2–3	—	3–0	6–2
Tammeka	0–4	1–3	1–0	1–4	0–1	1–0	1–1	1–3	—	3–1
Vaprus	0–2	3–1	3–1	1–1	0–8	3–5	0–1	1–3	1–2	—

Source: Estonian Football Association (in Estonian)
Legend: Blue = home team win; Yellow = draw; Red = away team win.

=== Second half of season ===
Home \ Away	FLO	KAL	KUR	LEG	LEV	NAR	NÕM	PLM	TAM	VAP
Flora	—	2–0	2–1	4–1	2–1	1–1	2–0	1–0	1–0	3–1
Tallinna Kalev	1–1	—	1–2	2–0	0–3	0–2	0–3	2–7	2–5	1–0
Kuressaare	2–3	1–1	—	1–0	2–3	3–1	0–0	3–3	2–2	1–0
Legion	0–1	2–3	3–2	—	1–1	1–0	1–2	1–1	1–1	2–1
FCI Levadia	1–2	3–1	2–3	3–0	—	1–1	1–1	1–2	1–0	3–0
Narva Trans	0–4	1–1	2–2	6–1	0–1	—	0–0	1–1	0–0	1–0
Nõmme Kalju	1–0	6–0	3–1	1–0	0–1	1–1	—	1–2	1–1	4–0
Paide	1–2	1–2	0–0	10–0	0–0	2–0	1–0	—	3–0	4–2
Tammeka	0–1	1–3	1–1	2–0	0–3	2–0	3–0	1–1	—	1–0
Vaprus	1–7	2–3	0–1	0–1	2–3	1–0	0–3	1–2	1–1	—

Source: Estonian Football Association (in Estonian)
Legend: Blue = home team win; Yellow = draw; Red = away team win.

== Relegation play-offs ==
23 November 2022
19:00 (UTC+2)

Elva	0–3	Legion
	Report	Tõugjas 9'; Vaherna 33'; Ivanov 43'

Nike Arena Elva, Elva
Attendance: 188
Referee: Martti Pukk
27 November 2022
13:00 (UTC+2)

Legion	0–1	Elva
	Report	Tõugjas 58' (o.g.)

Sportland Arena, Tallinn
Attendance: 28
Referee: Juri Frischer

Legion won 3–1 on aggregate.

== Season statistics ==
=== Top scorers ===
Rank	Player	Club	Goals
1	(Georgia (country)) Zakaria Beglarishvili	FCI Levadia	21
2	(Estonia) Robi Saarma	Paide Linnameeskond	16
3	(Estonia) Sten Reinkort	Kuressaare	15
4	(Estonia) Konstantin Vassiljev	Flora	13
5	(Estonia) Rauno Alliku	Flora	12
5	(Ukraine) Denys Dedechko	Narva Trans	12
5	(Estonia) Alex Matthias Tamm	Nõmme Kalju	12
8	(Estonia) Nikita Ivanov	Legion	11
8	(Estonia) Martin Miller	Flora	11
10	(Estonia) Danil Kuraksin	Flora	10
10	(Estonia) Kevin Mätas	Tammeka	10
10	(Estonia) Ats Purje	Tallinna Kalev	10
10	(Estonia) Sergei Zenjov	Flora	10

=== Hat-tricks ===
Player	For	Against	Result	Date
(Brazil) Liliu	FCI Levadia	Vaprus	8–0 (A)	5 March 2022
(Estonia) Martin Miller	Flora	Tallinna Kalev	7–1 (H)	6 March 2022
(Estonia) Mattias Männilaan	Kuressaare	Tallinna Kalev	3–0 (A)	12 March 2022
(Ukraine) Oleksandr Kozhevnikov	Narva Trans	Vaprus	5–3 (A)	9 July 2022
(Estonia) Ats Purje	Tallinna Kalev	Narva Trans	5–2 (H)	30 July 2022
(Estonia) Aleksandr Volkov	Nõmme Kalju	Tallinna Kalev	6–0 (H)	6 August 2022
(Estonia) Robi Saarma^{4}	Paide Linnameeskond	Tallinna Kalev	7–2 (A)	20 August 2022

Notes

^{4} Player scored 4 goals
(H) – Home team
(A) – Away team

=== Average attendance ===
Club	Average attendance
Flora	509
FCI Levadia	489
Vaprus	470
Nõmme Kalju	285
Tammeka	266
Tallinna Kalev	250
Paide Linnameeskond	235
Kuressaare	189
Narva Trans	189
Legion	121
League average	300

== Awards ==
=== Monthly awards ===
Month	Manager of the Month		Player of the Month		Goal of the Month	
Month	Manager	Club	Player	Club	Player	Club
March	(Estonia) Jürgen Henn	Flora	(Estonia) Konstantin Vassiljev	Flora	(Estonia) Markus Soomets	Flora
April	(Estonia) Jürgen Henn	Flora	(Estonia) Bogdan Vaštšuk	FCI Levadia	(Estonia) Bogdan Vaštšuk	FCI Levadia
May	(Serbia) Marko Savić (Estonia) Vladimir Vassiljev	FCI Levadia	(Estonia) Ioan Yakovlev	Tallinna Kalev	(Ghana) Ernest Agyiri	FCI Levadia
June/July	(Estonia) Jürgen Henn	Flora	(Georgia (country)) Zakaria Beglarishvili	FCI Levadia	(Georgia (country)) Zakaria Beglarishvili	FCI Levadia
August	(Ukraine) Roman Kozhukhovskyi	Kuressaare	(Estonia) Henrik Pürg	Flora	(Estonia) Virgo Vallik	Vaprus
September	(Estonia) Karel Voolaid	Paide Linnameeskond	(Estonia) Konstantin Vassiljev	Flora	(Georgia (country)) Zakaria Beglarishvili	FCI Levadia
October	(Estonia) Marti Pähn	Tammeka	(Estonia) Vladimir Avilov	Nõmme Kalju	(Estonia) Ioan Yakovlev	Tallinna Kalev

=== Annual awards ===
Award	Winner	Club
Player of the Season	(Estonia) Konstantin Vassiljev	Flora
Goalkeeper of the Season	(The Gambia) Ebrima Jarju	Paide Linnameeskond
Defender of the Season	(Estonia) Henrik Pürg	Flora
Midfielder of the Season	(Estonia) Konstantin Vassiljev	Flora
Forward of the Season	(Estonia) Sten Reinkort	Kuressaare
Under-21 Player of the Season	(Estonia) Alex Matthias Tamm	Nõmme Kalju
Goal of the Season	(Ghana) Ernest Agyiri	FCI Levadia
