= Henrik Pürg =

Estonian footballer

Personal information
- Full name: Henrik Pürg
- Date of birth: 3 June 1996 (age 30)
- Place of birth: Tallinn, Estonia
- Height: 1.86 m (6 ft 1 in)
- Position: Centre back

Youth career
- 2004–2007: Kotkas Juunior
- 2008–2012: Nõmme Kalju

Senior career*
Years	Team	Apps	(Gls)
2012–2017	Nõmme Kalju U21	106	(9)
2014–2018	Nõmme Kalju	71	(4)
2018–2024	Flora	116	(17)

International career^{‡}
2014	Estonia U19	15	(0)
2015–2018	Estonia U21	16	(0)
2016	Estonia U23	2	(0)
2019–2023	Estonia	11	(0)
- * Club domestic league appearances and goals as of 22 November 2023 ‡ National team caps and goals as of 26 June 2023

Henrik Pürg (born 3 June 1996) is a former Estonian professional footballer who played as a centre back for Meistriliiga club Flora and the Estonia national team.

== International career ==
Pürg made his senior international debut for Estonia on 11 January 2019, in a 2–1 friendly win over Finland.

== Honours ==
=== Club ===
Nõmme Kalju II

- Esiliiga B: 2013

Nõmme Kalju

- Estonian Cup: 2014–15

Flora

- Meistriliiga: 2019, 2020
- Estonian Cup: 2019–20
- Estonian Supercup: 2020, 2021

Individual

- Meistriliiga Player of the Month: August 2022
- Meistriliiga Defender of the Year: 2022
