= Maksim Podholjuzin =

Estonian footballer (born 1992)

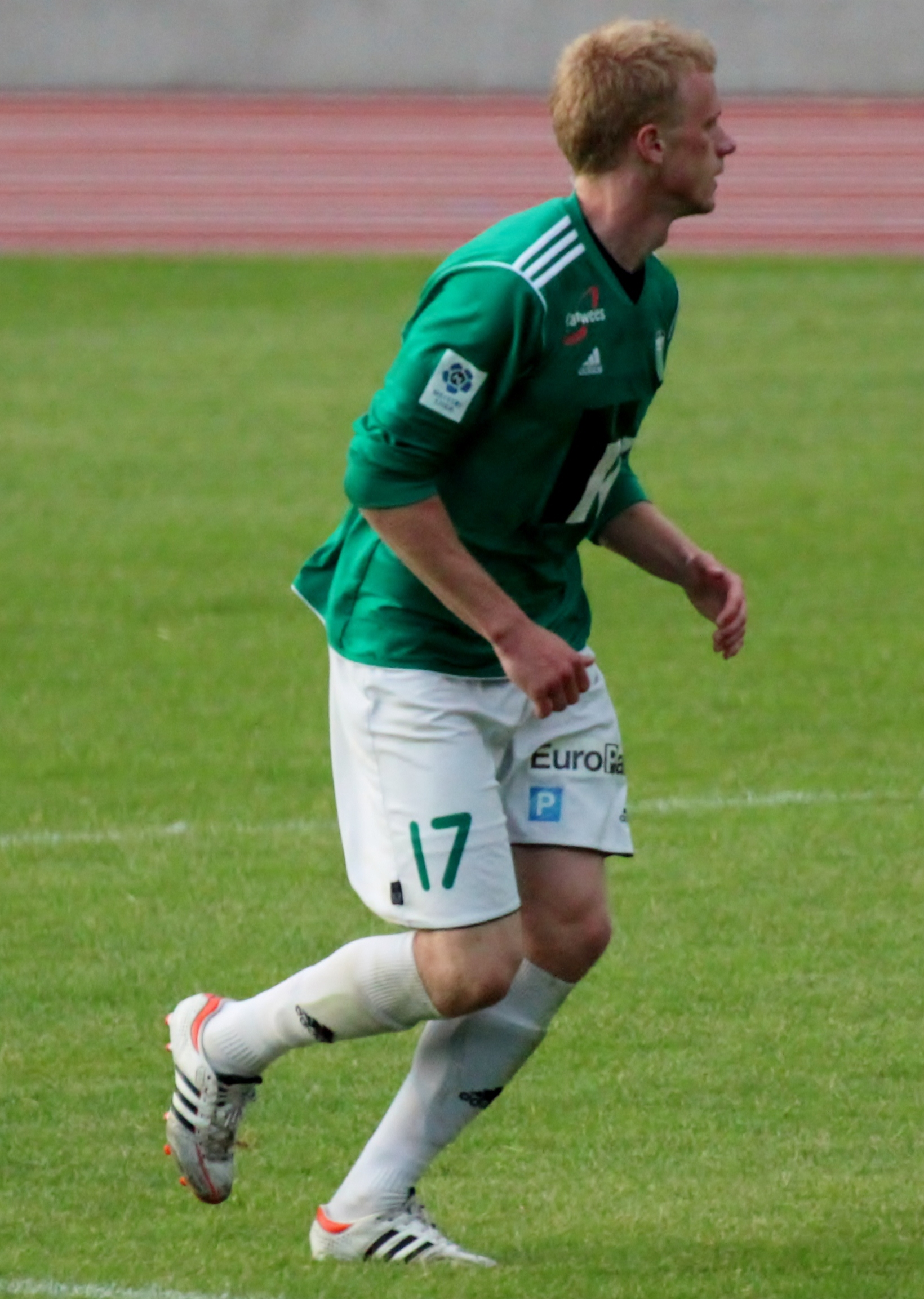

Personal information
- Full name: Maksim Podholjuzin
- Date of birth: 13 November 1992 (age 34)
- Place of birth: Tallinn, Estonia
- Height: 1.81 m (5 ft 11 in)
- Position: Defender

Team information
- Current team: Nõmme Kalju
- Number: 50

Senior career*
Years	Team	Apps	(Gls)
2008–2013	Levadia II	83	(6)
2009–2023	Levadia	350	(14)
2023–	Nõmme Kalju	118	(0)

International career^{‡}
2008	Estonia U17	5	(0)
2009	Estonia U18	1	(2)
2009–2011	Estonia U19	16	(0)
2011–2013	Estonia U21	26	(1)
2012	Estonia U23	1	(0)
2014	Estonia	1	(0)
- * Club domestic league appearances and goals as of 17 November 2026 ‡ National team caps and goals as of 21 June 2020

Maksim Podholjuzin (born 13 November 1992) is an Estonian professional footballer who plays as a defender for Nõmme Kalju in the Estonian Meistriliiga.

== Club career ==
=== Levadia ===
Podholjuzin made his debut for Levadia in 2009. He won his first Meistriliiga title with Levadia in 2013.

== International career ==
Podholjuzin made his international debut for Estonia on 5 March 2014 against Gibraltar.
