= Matvei Igonen =

Estonian footballer (born 1996)

Personal information
- Full name: Matvei Igonen
- Date of birth: 2 October 1996 (age 30)
- Place of birth: Tallinn, Estonia
- Height: 1.86 m (6 ft 1 in)
- Position: Goalkeeper

Team information
- Current team: Degerfors
- Number: 38

Youth career
- 2004–2006: Ajax Lasnamäe
- 2007–2012: Infonet

Senior career*
Years	Team	Apps	(Gls)
2012–2015	Infonet II	14	(0)
2012–2017	FCI Tallinn	147	(0)
2018–2019	Lillestrøm 2	13	(0)
2018–2020	Lillestrøm	5	(0)
2019	→ Flora (loan)	16	(0)
2020–2021	Flora	39	(0)
2022–2023	Podbeskidzie Bielsko-Biała	41	(0)
2023–2024	Hebar Pazardzhik	15	(0)
2024–2025	Botev Plovdiv	11	(0)
2025–	Degerfors	37	(0)

International career^{‡}
2011	Estonia U16	1	(0)
2012–2013	Estonia U17	6	(0)
2013–2014	Estonia U19	12	(0)
2014–2018	Estonia U21	12	(0)
2014	Estonia U23	1	(0)
2017–	Estonia	19	(0)
- * Club domestic league appearances and goals as of 21:15, 3 October 2026 (UTC) ‡ National team caps and goals as of 09:07, 7 October 2026 (UTC)

Matvei Igonen (born 2 October 1996) is an Estonian professional footballer who plays as a goalkeeper for Allsvenskan club Degerfors and the Estonia national team.

== Club career ==
Igonen made his Meistriliiga debut on 16 March 2013, in a 1–1 draw against Flora.

On 5 January 2018, Igonen signed a three-year contract with Norwegian club Lillestrøm. On 1 July 2019, Igonen joined Estonian club Flora on a half-year loan.

In July 2020 he signed a permanent deal with Flora until the end of 2021.

On 23 December 2021, Igonen joined Polish second division club Podbeskidzie Bielsko-Biała on a deal until June 2023.

In July 2023, he signed a contract with Bulgarian team Hebar Pazardzhik. In January 2024, after the player and Hebar were unable to reach an agreement regarding the financial terms of a new contract, Igonen became part of the ranks of Botev Plovdiv.

On 17 July 2025, Igonen joined Swedish club Degerfors IF on a contract for the rest of 2025.

== International career ==
Igonen made his senior international debut for Estonia on 23 November 2017, keeping a clean sheet in a 1–0 victory over Vanuatu in a friendly.

== Career statistics ==
=== International ===
As of match played 6 October 2026

Appearances and goals by national team and year
National team	Year	Apps	Goals
Estonia
Estonia	2017	1	0
Estonia	2018	1	0
Estonia	2019	1	0
Estonia	2020	1	0
Estonia	2021	6	0
Estonia	2022	4	0
Estonia	2023	0	0
Estonia	2024	1	0
Estonia	2025	2	0
Estonia	2026	2	0
Total		19	0

== Honours ==
FCI Tallinn

- Meistriliiga: 2016
- Esiliiga: 2012
- Estonian Cup: 2016–17
- Estonian Supercup: 2017

Flora

- Meistriliiga: 2019, 2020
- Estonian Supercup: 2021

Botev Plovdiv

- Bulgarian Cup: 2023–24

Individual

- Meistriliiga Team of the Season: 2020
