= Märten Kuusk =

Estonian footballer (born 1996)

Personal information
- Date of birth: 5 April 1996 (age 30)
- Place of birth: Tallinn, Estonia
- Height: 1.82 m (5 ft 11 1/2 in)
- Position: Centre-back

Team information
- Current team: Polonia Warsaw
- Number: 2

Youth career
- 2005–2007: Kotkas Juunior
- 2008–2012: Nõmme Kalju

Senior career*
Years	Team	Apps	(Gls)
2012–2016	Nõmme Kalju U21	91	(10)
2016–2017	Nõmme Kalju	1	(0)
2016	→ Tarvas (loan)	14	(2)
2017–2018	Flora U21	9	(0)
2017–2022	Flora	119	(13)
2022–2024	Újpest	13	(0)
2023	→ Flora (loan)	21	(2)
2024–2026	GKS Katowice	54	(1)
2026–	Polonia Warsaw	6	(0)

International career^{‡}
2011	Estonia U16	1	(0)
2012–2013	Estonia U17	8	(1)
2013–2014	Estonia U19	11	(0)
2015–2018	Estonia U21	22	(1)
2016	Estonia U23	1	(0)
2019–	Estonia	47	(0)
- * Club domestic league appearances and goals as of 18:46, 26 September 2026 (UTC) ‡ National team caps and goals as of 08:57, 7 October 2026 (UTC)

Märten Kuusk (born 5 April 1996) is an Estonian professional footballer who plays as a centre-back for I liga club Polonia Warsaw and the Estonia national team.

== Club career ==
=== Újpest ===
After leading FC Flora to their first ever European tournament group stage season and becoming the vice captain of the national team, on 25 January 2022 Kuusk signed for the Hungarian side Újpest on a 3.5 year contract. The transfer fee was not disclosed but was rumored to be a six figure sum.

=== GKS Katowice ===
On 15 January 2024, after making five appearances across all competitions for Újpest during the 2023–24 season, Kuusk moved to Polish second-tier side GKS Katowice, signing a one-and-a-half-year contract, with an option for another year.

=== Polonia Warsaw ===
On 13 July 2026, Kuusk left GKS Katowice to join I liga club Polonia Warsaw on a two-year deal, with a one-year extension option.

== International career ==
Kuusk made his senior international debut for Estonia on 15 January 2019, in a 0–0 friendly draw against Iceland.

== Career statistics ==
=== International ===
As of match played 6 October 2026

Appearances and goals by national team and year
National team	Year	Apps	Goals
Estonia
Estonia	2019	2	0
Estonia	2020	4	0
Estonia	2021	11	0
Estonia	2022	5	0
Estonia	2023	7	0
Estonia	2024	4	0
Estonia	2025	9	0
Estonia	2026	5	0
Total		47	0

== Honours ==
Nõmme Kalju II

- Esiliiga B: 2013

Nõmme Kalju

- Estonian Cup: 2014–15

Flora

- Meistriliiga: 2017, 2019, 2020
- Estonian Cup: 2019–20
- Estonian Supercup: 2020, 2021

Estonia

- Baltic Cup: 2020, 2024

Individual

- Meistriliiga Player of the Month: April 2019, August 2020
- Meistriliiga Team of the season: 2020
