= Mark Anders Lepik =

Estonian footballer (born 2000)

Personal information
- Full name: Mark Anders Lepik
- Date of birth: 10 September 2000 (age 26)
- Place of birth: Tallinn, Estonia
- Height: 1.84 m (6 ft 0 in)
- Position: Forward

Team information
- Current team: Pärnu Vaprus (on loan from Flora)
- Number: 22

Youth career
- 2009–2015: Saku Sporting
- 2015: Nõmme United
- 2016: Viimsi MRJK

Senior career*
Years	Team	Apps	(Gls)
2016	Nõmme United	12	(4)
2017–2025	Flora U21	30	(18)
2017–	Flora	119	(40)
2019	→ Winterthur (loan)	0	(0)
2023	→ Kuressaare (loan)	18	(3)
2026–	→ Pärnu Vaprus (loan)	13	(2)

International career^{‡}
2015	Estonia U16	2	(0)
2015–2016	Estonia U17	12	(2)
2017–2018	Estonia U19	14	(1)
2022	Estonia U21	1	(0)
2020–	Estonia	11	(1)
- * Club domestic league appearances and goals as of 17 November 2026 ‡ National team caps and goals as of 6 June 2026

Mark Anders Lepik (born 10 September 2000) is an Estonian footballer who plays as a forward for Pärnu Vaprus, on loan from Flora, and the Estonia national team.

== Club career ==
For the 2023 season, he went on loan to Kuressaare.

== International career ==
Lepik made his international debut for Estonia on 7 October 2020 in a friendly match against Lithuania.

== Career statistics ==
=== International ===
As of match played 6 June 2026

Estonia
Year	Apps	Goals
2020	4	0
2021	0	0
2022	0	0
2023	0	0
2024	6	1
2025	0	0
2026	1	0
Total	11	1

== Honours ==
Individual

- Meistriliiga Player of the Month: May 2024
