= Sten Reinkort =

Estonian footballer

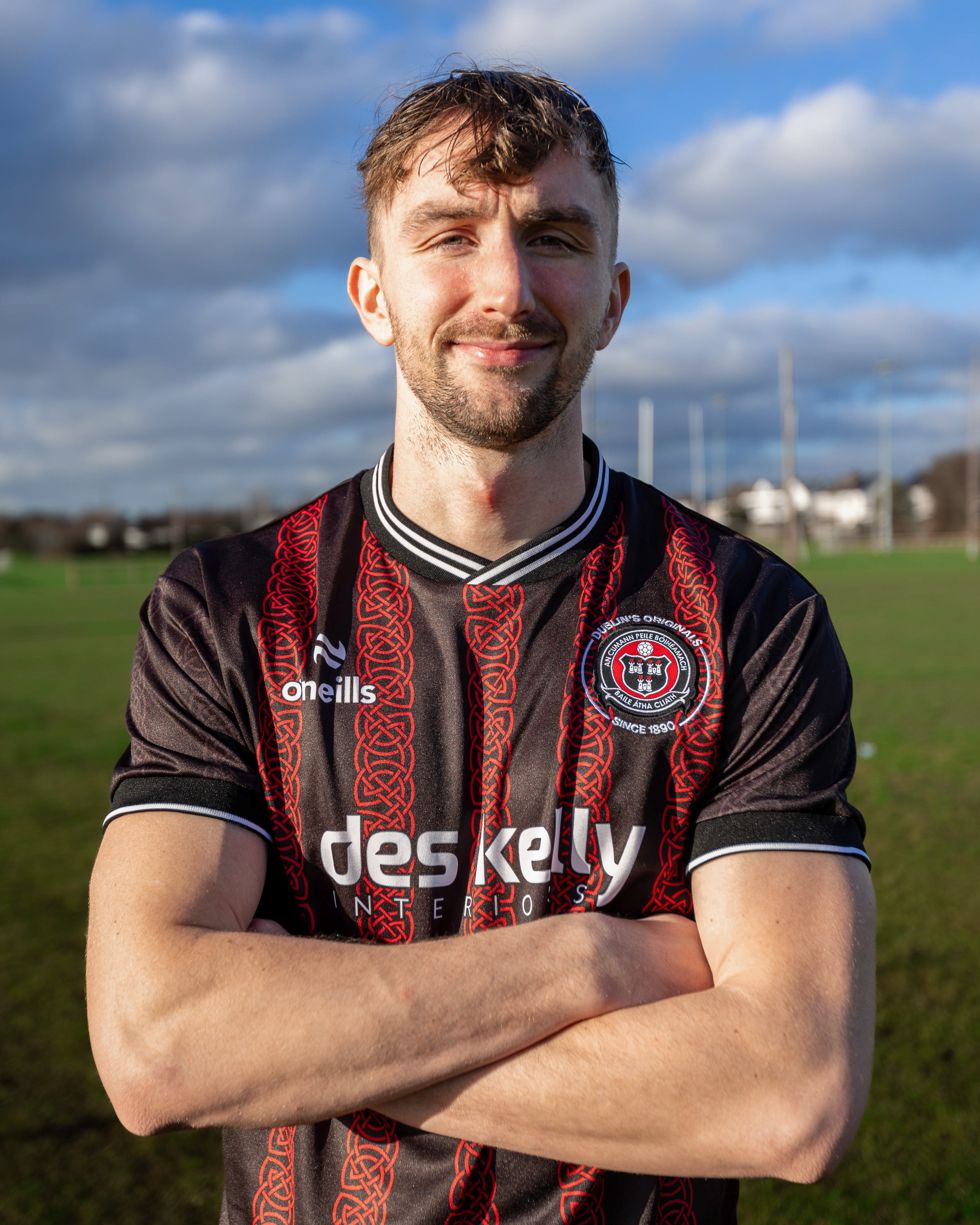
- Reinkort with Bohemians in 2024

Personal information
- Full name: Sten Reinkort
- Date of birth: 29 April 1998 (age 28)
- Place of birth: Tartu, Estonia
- Position: Forward

Team information
- Current team: Kormákur/Hvöt
- Number: 11

Youth career
- 2006–2010: Tartu Olümpia
- 2011: Tartu Linnameeskond

Senior career*
Years	Team	Apps	(Gls)
2015	Tammeka II	15	(7)
2015–2018	Tammeka U21	85	(25)
2018–2020	Tammeka	83	(16)
2021	Flora U21	9	(2)
2020–2023	Flora	35	(6)
2022–2023	→ Kuressaare (loan)	45	(18)
2024	Bohemians	8	(1)
2024	Şanlıurfaspor	3	(0)
2025	Paide Linnameeskond	20	(2)
2026	Sporting Clube de Espinho	15	(0)
2026–	Kormákur/Hvöt	10	(3)

International career
2019–2020	Estonia U21	13	(1)
2023	Estonia	5	(0)
- * Club domestic league appearances and goals as of 14 October 2026

Sten Reinkort (born 29 April 1998) is an Estonian professional footballer who plays as a forward for Icelandic club Kormákur/Hvöt.

== International career ==
Reinkort made his senior international debut for Estonia on 12 January 2023, in a 1–0 victory over Finland in a friendly.

== Honours ==
Flora

- Estonian Supercup: 2021

Individual

- Meistriliiga Forward of the Season: 2022
