= Martin Miller (footballer) =

Estonian footballer (born 1997)

Personal information
- Full name: Martin Miller
- Date of birth: 25 September 1997 (age 29)
- Place of birth: Tartu, Estonia
- Height: 1.77 m (5 ft 9 1/2 in)
- Position: Midfielder

Team information
- Current team: Paide Linnameeskond
- Number: 10

Youth career
- 2007–2013: Tammeka

Senior career*
Years	Team	Apps	(Gls)
2013–2014	Luunja	16	(2)
2013	Tammeka II	5	(0)
2014–2016	Tammeka	76	(4)
2017	Flora U21	3	(0)
2016–2023	Flora	177	(39)
2024	Bohemians	20	(0)
2025–	Paide Linnameeskond	61	(12)

International career^{‡}
2014–2015	Estonia U19	10	(1)
2016–2017	Estonia U21	14	(1)
2016	Estonia U23	1	(0)
2016–	Estonia	41	(2)
- * Club domestic league appearances and goals as of 17 November 2026 ‡ National team caps and goals as of 30 September 2026

Martin Miller (born 25 September 1997) is an Estonian professional footballer who plays as a midfielder for the Estonia national team and for Paide Linnameeskond in the Meistriliiga in Estonia.

== Club career ==
=== Tammeka ===
Miller came through the Tammeka youth academy. He made his debut in the Meistriliiga on 20 May 2014, in a 0–6 home loss to Sillamäe Kalev. Miller scored his first Meistriliiga goal on 7 July 2014, scoring the winning goal in Tammeka's 2–1 away win over Narva Trans. He played in every match of the 2016 season, scoring three goals.

=== Flora ===
On 13 November 2016, Miller signed a three-year contract with Flora. He helped Flora win the Meistriliiga title in 2017. On 25 November 2021 he scored the goal that allowed Flora to beat Partizan Belgrade 1–0 in the fifth game of the 2021–22 UEFA Conference League group stage, which was historic because this meant that Flora became the first ever Estonian team to win a game in a UEFA group stage.

== International career ==
Miller has represented Estonia at under-19, under-21 and under-23 levels. He made his senior international debut for Estonia on 22 November 2016, in a 1–0 away victory over Antigua and Barbuda in a friendly. On 19 November 2017, he scored his first international goal in a 2–0 away win over Fiji.

=== International goals ===
As of 20 November 2017. Estonia score listed first, score column indicates score after each Miller goal.

International goals by date, venue, cap, opponent, score, result and competition
No.	Date	Venue	Cap	Opponent	Score	Result	Competition
1	19 November 2017	ANZ Stadium, Suva, Fiji	4	Fiji	2–0	2–0	Friendly
2	12 January 2023	Estadio da Nora, Albufeira, Portugal	22	Finland	1–0	1–0	Friendly
