= Markus Soomets =

Estonian footballer (born 2000)

Personal information
- Date of birth: 2 March 2000 (age 26)
- Place of birth: Tartu, Estonia
- Height: 1.82 m (6 ft 0 in)
- Position: Midfielder

Team information
- Current team: Kolding

Youth career
- 2011–2016: Santos
- 2018–2019: Sampdoria

Senior career*
Years	Team	Apps	(Gls)
2015–2017	Santos II	3	(0)
2015–2018	Santos	56	(1)
2019	Tammeka	3	(2)
2019	Rende	4	(0)
2020–2024	Flora	108	(6)
2025	Den Bosch	16	(0)
2025–2026	Start	28	(1)
2026–	Kolding	0	(0)

International career^{‡}
2015–2016	Estonia U17	18	(1)
2017–2018	Estonia U19	20	(0)
2019–2020	Estonia U21	10	(1)
2019	Estonia U23	1	(0)
2020–	Estonia	26	(0)
Medal record
Representing Estonia
Men's football
FIFA Series
Runner-up	2026 Rwanda
- * Club domestic league appearances and goals as of 20 August 2026 ‡ National team caps and goals as of 3 October 2026

Markus Soomets (born 2 March 2000) is an Estonian professional footballer who plays as a midfielder for Danish club Kolding and the Estonia national team.

== Club career ==
On 17 January 2020, he returned from Italy to Estonia and signed a 3-year contract with Flora.

On 18 December 2024, Soomets signed a contract with Den Bosch in the Netherlands, from 1 January 2025 to 30 June 2026, with club option to extend for one more season.

On 9 July 2025, Soomets signed a contract with IK Start in the Norwegian First Division.

On 20 August 2026, Soomets signed a contract with Kolding IF in the Danish 1st Division.

== International career ==
He made his debut for Estonia national football team on 11 November 2020 in a friendly game against Italy. He played the full game.

== Honours ==
Estonia

- FIFA Series runner-up: 2026

Individual

- Meistriliiga Goal of the Month: March 2022
- Norwegian First Division Player of the Month: August 2025
