= Estonian Supercup =

Estonian football competition

- Organiser(s): Estonian Football Association
- Founded: 1996; 30 years ago
- Region: Estonia
- Teams: 2
- Current champions: Nõmme Kalju (2nd title)
- Most championships: Flora (12 titles)
- Website: Estonian Supercup

The Estonian Supercup (Estonian: Eesti Superkarikas) is Estonian football's annual super cup, contested between the champions of the previous Meistriliiga season and the holders of the Estonian Cup. If the Meistriliiga champions also won the Estonian Cup, then the league runners-up provide the opposition.

In 2024, the competition was branded the A. Le Coq Superkarikas in a naming rights deal with the Estonian brewery A. Le Coq.

The current supercup holders are Nõmme Kalju FC.

== Matches ==
Year	Winner	Score	Runner-up	Venue	Report
1996	Tallinna Sadam	3–2	Lantana	Maarjamäe Stadium	
1997	Lantana	3–0	Tallinna Sadam	Maarjamäe Stadium	
1998	Flora	3–2 (a.e.t.)	Tallinna Sadam	Kehtna Stadium	
1999	Levadia	4–1	Flora	Kadriorg Stadium	
2000	Levadia	2–1 (a.e.t.)	Tulevik	Kuressaare linnastaadion	
2001	Levadia	2–0	Narva Trans	Narva Kreenholm Stadium	
2001	Levadia	3–0 (5–0 agg.)	Narva Trans	Lilleküla artificial turf	
2002	Flora	1–1 (4–2 p)	Levadia II	Lilleküla artificial turf	
2003	Flora	3–1 (a.e.t.)	TVMK	A. Le Coq MiniArena	
2004	Flora	2–1	Levadia	A. Le Coq MiniArena	
2005	TVMK	1–0	Levadia	A. Le Coq MiniArena	
2006	TVMK	1–1 (3–2 p)	Flora	Sportland Arena	
2007	Narva Trans	2–1	Levadia	Sportland Arena	
2008	Narva Trans	4–1	Levadia	Sportland Arena	
2009	Flora	2–1	Levadia	Sportland Arena	
2010	Levadia	2–0	Flora	Sportland Arena	
2011	Flora	0–0 (5–3 p)	Levadia	Sportland Arena	
2012	Flora	4–0	Narva Trans	Sportland Arena	
2013	Levadia	3–0	Nõmme Kalju	Sportland Arena	
2014	Flora	1–0	Levadia	Sportland Arena	
2015	Levadia	5–0	Santos	Sportland Arena	
2016	Flora	3–0	Nõmme Kalju	Sportland Arena	
2017	FCI Tallinn	5–0	Flora	Sportland Arena	
2018	FCI Levadia	2–2 (4–3 p)	Flora	EJL Jalgpallihall	
2019	Nõmme Kalju	3–2	FCI Levadia	Sportland Arena	
2020	Flora	2–0	Narva Trans	Narva Kalev-Fama Stadium	
2021	Flora	1–0	Paide Linnameeskond	Sportland Arena	
2022	FCI Levadia	0–0 (4–2 p)	Flora	Sportland Arena	
2023	Paide Linnameeskond	3–2	Flora	Sportland Arena	
2024	Flora	2–2 (5–3 p)	Narva Trans	Männimäe Jalgpallihall	
2025	FCI Levadia	3–2	Nõmme Kalju	Männimäe Jalgpallihall	
2026	Nõmme Kalju	3–1	Flora	Paide Jalgpallihall	

1. Estonian Football Association awarded Levadia a 3–0 win due to Narva Trans fielding suspended player in the second leg. The original match had ended in a 3–1 win for Levadia.

== Performance by club ==
Club	Winners	Runners-up	Winning years
Flora	12	8	1998, 2002, 2003, 2004, 2009, 2011, 2012, 2014, 2016, 2020, 2021, 2024
FCI Levadia	9	8	1999, 2000, 2001, 2010, 2013, 2015, 2018, 2022, 2025
Narva Trans	2	4	2007, 2008
Nõmme Kalju	2	3	2019, 2026
TVMK	2	1	2005, 2006
Tallinna Sadam	1	2	1996
Lantana	1	1	1997
Paide Linnameeskond	1	1	2023
FCI Tallinn	1	0	2017
Tulevik	0	1	
Levadia II	0	1	
Santos	0	1	
