= 2024 in Estonian football =

Football in Estonia
- Season: 2024

Men's football
- Meistriliiga: Tallinna FCI Levadia
- Esiliiga: Harju JK Laagri
- Esiliiga B: Tartu JK Tammeka U21
- Beach football: SK Augur Enemat/Coolbet
- Futsal: Sillamäe FC NPM Silmet
- Tipneri karikas: Tallinna FCI Levadia
- Supercup: Tallinna FC Flora

Women's football
- Meistriliiga: Tallinna FC Flora
- Esiliiga: Nõmme Kalju FC
- Futsal: –
- Estonian Cup: Tallinna FC Flora
- Supercup: Tallinna FC Flora

This page summarizes everything related to Estonian football in the year 2024. It contains information about different league systems, national teams, futsal, beach football and most important transfers.

== National teams ==
Times are EET/EEST, (Note: EEST (UTC+3) for dates between 31 March and 27 October 2024 and EET (UTC+2) for all other dates.) as listed by UEFA.

=== Association football ===
==== Men ====
===== Senior =====
In 2024, Estonian football experienced a year of significant transitions and notable events. The Estonia men's national football team participated in the Euro 2024 qualifying play-offs for the second time, where they were defeated by Poland with a score of 5-1. Long-time head coach Thomas Häberli resigned after three years and 39 matches, marking the end of his tenure, and was succeeded by former assistant coach Jürgen Henn. Häberli and record international player Konstantin Vassiljev both played their last game in the match against Switzerland. Vassiljev retired from national team duty, capping off a distinguished career, which saw him play 158 matches and score 26 goals over 18 years. In Jürgen Henn's initial matches as head coach, Estonia achieved a narrow victory in the Baltic Cup, triumphing over Lithuania in a penalty shootout. The year concluded with another Nations League campaign, where Estonia earned four points from six matches, both coming in their encounters against Azerbaijan. This marked a significant milestone, as for the first time, Estonia avoided finishing last in a C-League season, demonstrating progress in their competitive performance on the European stage.

In addition to the managerial and player changes, 2024 also saw the debut of eight new players for the Estonian national team. These newcomers included Kristo Hussar, Nikita Mihhailov, Andreas Vaher, Kevor Palumets, Ramol Sillamaa, Robert Veering, and Oskar Hõim. Moreover, nine players scored their first goals for the team: Palumets (in his debut), Martin Vetkal, Alex Matthias Tamm (who scored two), Edgar Tur, Danil Kuraksin, Mark Anders Lepik, Ioan Yakovlev, Vlasiy Sinyavskiy and Rocco Robert Shein. These developments marked a new phase for Estonian football as the team adjusted to the leadership of Jürgen Henn and prepared for future competitions.

12 January Friendly	Sweden	2–1	Estonia	Paphos, Cyprus
20:00 (UTC+3)	Nanasi 30'; Thelin 54'	Report	19' Palumets	Stadium: Stelios Kyriakides Stadium; Referee: Kyriakos Athanasiou (Cyprus)

21 March 2024 EC qualifying — play-offs	Poland	5–1	Estonia	Warsaw, Poland
21:45 (UTC+3)	Frankowski 22'; Zieliński 50'; Piotrowski 70'; Mets 74' (o.g.); S. Szymański 76'	Report	78' Vetkal	Stadium: Stadion Narodowy; Attendance: 53,868; Referee: Slavko Vinčić (Slovenia)

26 March Friendly	Finland	2–1	Estonia	Helsinki, Finland
20:00 (UTC+3)	F. Jensen 30'; Hein 38' (o.g.)	Report	62' A. Tamm	Stadium: Helsinki Olympic Stadium; Attendance: 12,559; Referee: Mads Kristoffersen (Denmark)

4 June Friendly	Switzerland	4–0	Estonia	Lucerne, Switzerland
21:15 (UTC+3)	Zuber 20'; Amdouni 47'; Elvedi 63'; Shaqiri 70' (pen.)	Report		Stadium: Swissporarena; Attendance: 14,473; Referee: Kyriakos Athanasiou (Cyprus)

8 June Baltic Cup	Estonia	4–1	Faroe Islands	Tallinn, Estonia
19:00 (UTC+3)	Tamm 43'; Anier 50'; Tur 83'; Kuraksin 89'	Report	24' Knudsen	Stadium: Lilleküla Stadium; Attendance: 3,919; Referee: Robertas Valikonis (Lithuania)

11 June Baltic Cup	Lithuania	1–1 (3–4 p)	Estonia	Kaunas, Lithuania
19:00 (UTC+3)	Matulevičius 84'	Report	82' Lepik	Stadium: Darius and Girėnas Stadium; Attendance: 5,900; Referee: Andris Treimanis (Latvia)
	Penalties
	Lasickas (penalty missed); Černych (penalty missed); Tutyškinas (penalty scored); Novikovas (penalty scored); Klimavičius (penalty scored)		(penalty scored) Mets; (penalty scored) Lepik; (penalty scored) Palumets; (penalty missed) Sorga; (penalty scored) Vetkal

5 September 2024-25 NL — group C1	Estonia	0–1	Slovakia	Tallinn, Estonia
21:45 (UTC+3)		Report	70' Suslov	Stadium: Lilleküla Stadium; Attendance: 6,128; Referee: Matej Jug (Slovenia)

8 September 2024-25 NL — group C1	Sweden	3–0	Estonia	Gothenburg, Sweden
21:45 (UTC+3)	Gyökeres 30', 44'; Isak 40'	Report		Stadium: Gamla Ullevi; Attendance: 14,858; Referee: Sven Jablonski (Germany)

11 October 2024-25 NL — group C1	Estonia	3–1	Azerbaijan	Tallinn, Estonia
21:45 (UTC+3)	Yakovlev 32'; Sinyavskiy 45+2'; Shein 71'	Report	45+1' (pen.) Bayramov	Stadium: Lilleküla Stadium; Attendance: 6,034; Referee: Rob Harvey (Republic of Ireland)

14 October 2024-25 NL — group C1	Estonia	0–3	Sweden	Tallinn, Estonia
21:45 (UTC+3)		Report	29', 37' Nanasi; 66' Gyökeres	Stadium: Lilleküla Stadium; Attendance: 4,706; Referee: Juxhin Xhaja (Albania)

16 November 2024-25 NL — group C1	Azerbaijan	0–0	Estonia	Gabala, Azerbaijan
17:00 (UTC+3)		Report		Stadium: Gabala City Stadium; Attendance: 1,600; Referee: John Beaton (Scotland)

5 September 2024-25 NL — group C1	Slovakia	1–0	Estonia	Košice, Slovakia
21:45 (UTC+3)	Strelec 72'	Report		Stadium: Košická futbalová aréna Attendance: 4,317; Referee: Mikkel Redder (Denmark)

===== U21 =====
21 March Friendly	Estonia	6–1	FC Horsens	Antalya, Turkey
15:00 (UTC+3)	Õunapuu 14'; Palutaja 47'; Vassiljev 57'; Kuraksin 66'; Pank 68'; Šapovalov 78'	Report	44' Norgaard	Stadium: Helsinki Olympic Stadium

24 March Friendly	Estonia	0–4	Nordic United FC	Antalya, Turkey
10:00 (UTC+3)		Report	52' Swedi; 57' Cisse; 62' unknown; 77' Arabi	Stadium: Helsinki Olympic Stadium

6 June Baltic Cup	Estonia	1–0	Finland	Kuressaare, Estonia
19:00 (UTC+3)	Tammik 21'	Report		Stadium: Kuressaare linnastaadion Attendance: 195; Referee: Kristo Tohver (Estonia)

9 June Baltic Cup	Estonia	3–3 (2–4 p)	Latvia	Kuressaare, Estonia
17:00 (UTC+3)	Šapovalov 9'; Teeväli 45' (pen.), 79'	Report	1' Anmanis; 4' Patika; 64' Melkis	Stadium: Kuressaare linnastaadion Attendance: 114; Referee: Tanel Üprus (Estonia)
	Penalties
	Mihhailov (penalty scored); Luts (penalty scored); Teeväli (penalty missed); Mustmaa (penalty missed)		(penalty scored) Melniks; (penalty scored) Minins; (penalty scored) Kaušelis; (penalty scored) Penkevics

7 September (Note: The Israel v Estonia match was originally to be played on 12 October 2023, 18:00 (19:00 IST), but was postponed due to the Gaza war.) 2025 EC qualifying — first round	Israel	1–0	Estonia	Győr, Hungary
21:00 (UTC+3)	Madmon 67' (pen.)	Report		Stadium: Ménfői úti Stadion; Attendance: 0 (Note: Due to the Gaza war protests, the Israel v Estonia match was played behind closed doors.); Referee: Jamie Robinson (Northern Ireland)

10 September 2025 EC qualifying — first round	Estonia	1–10	Germany	Tallinn, Estonia
19:00	Šapovalov 69'	Report	23' (pen.), 47' Woltemade; 31' Tresoldi; 35', 44', 61' Adeyemi; 39' Martel; 59' Rosenfelder; 87' Lemperle; 90' Knauff	Stadium: Kadriorg Stadium; Attendance: 2,672; Referee: Antoine Chiaramonti (Andorra)

10 October 2025 EC qualifying — first round	Estonia	1–0	Israel	Tallinn, Estonia
19:00	Varjund 71'	Report		Stadium: Kadriorg Stadium; Attendance: 227; Referee: Dmytro Panchyshyn (Ukraine)

15 October 2025 EC qualifying — first round	Estonia	3–1	Kosovo	Tallinn, Estonia
17:00	Teeväli 21' (pen.); Kristal 44'; Usta 87'	Report	77' Avdyli	Stadium: Kadriorg Stadium; Attendance: 178; Referee: Jason Barcelo (Gibraltar)

==== Women ====
===== Senior =====
21 February Turkish Women's Cup	India	4–3	Estonia	Alanya, Turkey
10:00 (UTC+3)	Kalyan 17', 82'; Kathiresan 61'; Xaxa 80'	Report	32' Tammik; 87' Kubassova; 89' Salei	Stadium: Gold City Sport Complex; Attendance: 60; Referee: Melisa Özcigdem (Turkey)

24 February Turkish Women's Cup	Kosovo	3–0	Estonia	Alanya, Turkey
10:00 (UTC+3)	Uka 14'; Ejupi 30'; Metaj 33'	Report		Stadium: Gold City Sport Complex; Attendance: 35; Referee: Cansu Tiryaki (Turkey)

27 February Turkish Women's Cup	Estonia	1–0	Hong Kong	Alanya, Turkey
14:30 (UTC+3)	Kala 73'	Report		Stadium: Gold City Sport Complex; Attendance: 40; Referee: Melis Özcigdem (Turkey)

9 April 2025 EC qualifying — first round	Albania	2–0	Estonia	Tirana, Albania
21:00 (UTC+3)	F. Berisha 31'; Maksuti 90+3'	Report		Stadium: Arena Kombëtare; Attendance: 720; Referee: Anastasiya Romanyuk (Ukraine)

31 May 2025 EC qualifying — first round	Estonia	1–2	Albania	Tallinn, Estonia
18:00 (UTC+3)	Himanen 17'	Report	7' F. Berisha; 90+2' Krasniqi	Stadium: Lilleküla Stadium; Attendance: 934; Referee: Tatyana Sorokopudova (Kazakhstan)

12 July 2025 EC qualifying — first round	Luxembourg	1–1	Estonia	Esch-sur-Alzette, Luxembourg
20:30 (UTC+3)	Miller 48'	Report	53' Tammik	Stadium: Stade Émile Mayrisch; Attendance: 587; Referee: Tjaša Misja (Slovenia)

16 July 2025 EC qualifying — first round	Estonia	1–1	Luxembourg	Tartu, Estonia
20:00 (UTC+3)	Teern 49'	Report	18' Thompson	Stadium: Tamme Stadium; Attendance: 566; Referee: Teona Sturua (Georgia)

24 October Baltic Cup	Estonia	2–2 (3–1 p)	Lithuania	Riga, Latvia
13:00 (UTC+3)	Salei 75'; Kubassova 90+3' (pen.)	Report	76', 79' Šupelytė	Stadium: Jānis Skredelis' Stadium; Attendance: 115; Referee: Jelena Jermolajeva (Latvia)
	Penalties
	Lillemets (penalty scored); Räämet (penalty missed); Himanen (penalty scored); Kubassova (penalty missed); Tammik (penalty scored)		(penalty scored) Lazdauskaitė; (penalty missed) Vaitukaitytė; (penalty missed) Mikutaitė; (penalty missed) Šupelytė

27 October Baltic Cup	Latvia	0–1	Estonia	Riga, Latvia
18:00 (UTC+3)		Report	66' Saulus	Stadium: Jānis Skredelis' Stadium; Attendance: 415; Referee: Jurgita Mačikunytė (Lithuania)

29 November Friendly	Kosovo	8–0	Estonia	Pristina, Kosovo
15:00 (UTC+3)	Biqkaj 6'; Memeti 15', 32', 50'; Fetaj 41'; Uka 68', 71', 82' (pen.)	Report		Stadium: Fadil Vokrri Stadium; Referee: Florian Lata (Albania)

2 December Friendly	Kosovo	1–2	Estonia	Pristina, Kosovo
15:00 (UTC+3)	Halilaj 90+1' (pen.)	Report	23' Kubassova; 35' Teern	Stadium: Fadil Vokrri Stadium; Referee: Florian Lata (Albania)

== League system ==
=== Association football ===
==== Men ====
===== Premium liiga =====
Pos	Team	Pld	W	D	L	GF	GA	GD	Pts	Promotion, qualification or relegation
1	Tallinna FCI Levadia (C)	36	27	6	3	82	19	+63	87	Champions League first qualifying round
2	Nõmme Kalju FC	36	21	9	6	79	44	+35	72	Conference League first qualifying round
3	Paide Linnameeskond	36	23	3	10	74	39	+35	72	Conference League first qualifying round
4	Tallinna FC Flora	36	21	7	8	69	43	+26	70	
5	Tartu JK Tammeka	36	11	9	16	47	54	−7	42	
6	JK Narva Trans	36	10	12	14	48	63	−15	42	
7	Pärnu JK Vaprus	36	9	8	19	35	57	−22	35	
8	FC Kuressaare	36	8	10	18	46	67	−21	34	
9	JK Tallinna Kalev	36	8	7	21	37	74	−37	31	Play-off for Esiliiga
10	FC Nõmme United (R)	36	2	9	25	22	79	−57	15	Esiliiga

Source: EJL
Rules for classification: 1) Points; 2) Less matches awarded against; 3) Head-to-head points; 4) Head-to-head goal difference; 5) Matches won; 6) Goal difference; 7) Goals scored; 8) Away goals scored; 9) Fairplay ranking.
(C) Champions; (R) Relegated
Locations of the 2024 Meistriliiga teams

Relegation play-off:

Team 1	Agg.	Team 2	1st leg	2nd leg
Viimsi JK (Esiliiga 2nd)	1–2	JK Tallinna Kalev (Meistriliiga 9th)	1–1	0–1

===== Esiliiga =====
Pos	Team	Pld	W	D	L	GF	GA	GD	Pts	Promotion, qualification or relegation
1	Harju JK Laagri (C, P)	36	22	12	2	110	42	+68	78	Meistriliiga
2	Viimsi JK	36	22	9	5	75	42	+33	75	Promotion play-off
3	Tallinna FC Flora U21 (Note: Reserve teams are ineligible for promotion.)	36	20	6	10	96	55	+41	66	
4	Tartu JK Welco	36	16	12	8	70	44	+26	60	
5	FC Tallinn	36	15	8	13	67	54	+13	53	
6	Tallinna FCI Levadia U21	36	13	5	18	60	71	−11	44	
7	JK Tallinna Kalev U21	36	11	9	16	72	87	−15	42	
8	FC Elva	36	10	11	15	47	62	−15	41	Play-off for Esiliiga B
9	Paide Linnameeskond U21 (R)	36	7	4	25	47	121	−74	25	Esiliiga B
10	JK Tabasalu (R)	36	4	4	28	35	101	−66	16	Esiliiga B

Updated to match(es) played on 9 October. Source: EJL
Rules for classification: 1) Points; 2) Less matches awarded against; 3) Head-to-head points; 4) Head-to-head goal difference; 5) Matches won; 6) Goal difference; 7) Goals scored; 8) Away goals scored; 9) Fairplay ranking.
(C) Champions; (P) Promoted; (R) Relegated
Notes:
Locations of the 2024 Esiliiga teams

Relegation play-off:

Team 1	Agg.	Team 2	1st leg	2nd leg
Tallinna JK Legion (Esiliiga B 3rd)	0–9	FC Elva (Esiliiga 8th)	0–3	0–6

===== Esiliiga B =====
Pos	Team	Pld	W	D	L	GF	GA	GD	Pts	Promotion, qualification or relegation
1	Tartu JK Tammeka U21 (C, P)	36	22	8	6	91	44	+47	74	Esiliiga
2	Nõmme Kalju FC U21 (P)	36	20	3	13	101	61	+40	63	Esiliiga
3	Tallinna JK Legion	36	18	4	14	64	49	+15	58	Promotion play-off
4	FC Kuressaare U21	36	17	4	15	66	70	−4	55	
5	FA Tartu Kalev	36	16	7	13	60	64	−4	55	
6	JK Narva Trans U21	36	15	9	12	57	51	+6	54	
7	Jõhvi FC Phoenix	36	12	9	15	78	81	−3	45	
8	Läänemaa JK	36	12	6	18	62	86	−24	42	Play-off for II liiga
9	Viljandi JK Tulevik (R)	36	10	5	21	49	74	−25	35	II liiga
10	Pärnu JK (R)	36	8	5	23	46	94	−48	29	II liiga

Source: EJL
Rules for classification: 1) Points; 2) Less matches awarded against; 3) Head-to-head points; 4) Head-to-head goal difference; 5) Matches won; 6) Goal difference; 7) Goals scored; 8) Away goals scored; 9) Fairplay ranking.
(C) Champions; (P) Promoted; (R) Relegated
Locations of the 2024 Esiliiga B teams

Relegation play-off:

Team 1	Agg.	Team 2	1st leg	2nd leg
Tallinna Puuma & Volta ÜM (II N/E 2nd)	4–6	Pärnu JK Vaprus U21 (II S/W 2nd)	1–4	3–2

Team 1	Agg.	Team 2	1st leg	2nd leg
Pärnu JK Vaprus U21 (II liiga p-o winner)	4–6	Läänemaa JK (Esiliiga B 8th)	2–2	2–4

===== II liiga =====
The season starts on 23 March and ends on 27 October. The teams in both regions compete in a home-and-away system: all teams face each other twice, accumulating a total of 26 league matches over the course of the season. Reserve teams, which do not have "U21" or "U19" in their name, are ineligible for promotion.

North / East

The 2024 II liiga North/East (N/E) division saw significant changes from the previous season. Despite winning the division in 2023, Maardu Linnameeskond was not promoted to Esiliiga B due to non-compliance with league requirements. Consequently, Jõhvi FC Phoenix and JK Noova, who finished as runners-up, secured promotion instead. On the other end of the table, Valga FC Warrior and Kohtla-Järve JK Järve were relegated after finishing last. The departure of these three teams opened up spots for new entrants: Põhja-Tallinna JK Puuma (who joined forces with JK Volta after winning the III liiga West in 2023), Sillamäe FC NPM Silmet (finishing 5th in III liiga East but winning their promotion play-offs), and FC Elva II (returning to II liiga after a fourth-place finish in the 2023 III liiga South). Notably, before the season began, Maardu strengthened their squad by signing two players who had competed in the Meistriliiga the previous year: 31-year-old Aleksandr Kulinitš and 28-year-old Vladimir Avilov.

The season saw Maardu Linnameeskond clinch the title for the second consecutive year, showcasing even greater dominance by remaining undefeated with only three draws. Newcomers Põhja-Tallinna JK Puuma made an impressive debut, finishing in second place and securing a spot in the promotion playoffs after an astonishing tally of 132 goals in 26 matches. At the bottom of the table, Ararat and Ajax were relegated. Remarkably, a comparison between last season’s top 10 and this year's reveals that seven teams maintained their positions. Tartu JK Welco II and FC Tallinn U21 swapped places (Welco moved from 6th to 7th, and FC Tallinn from 7th to 6th), while Puuma replaced Jõhvi FC Phoenix in the rankings. Additionally, former Estonian national team player Albert Prosa, playing for Puuma, set a new II liiga North/East record by finishing as the league's top scorer with 40 goals.

South / West

The 2024 II liiga South/West (S/W) division experienced several notable changes from the previous season. Despite clinching the top spot in 2023, Harju JK Laagri U21 was not promoted to Esiliiga B. Meanwhile, the bottom two teams, FC Kose and Pärnu JK Poseidon, were relegated. Additionally, Pärnu JK Tervis, which finished 7th, did not rejoin the Estonian league system in 2024. To fill the vacant spots, three clubs were promoted from III liiga: Tallinna FC Zapoos (champions of the 2023 III liiga North), Paide Linnameeskond III (champions of the 2023 III liiga East), and Tabasalu Ulasabat C.F. (2nd place in III liiga West and winners of the promotion playoffs). Notably, Paide III returns to the division, where they were dominant champions from 2018 to 2022.

The season saw FC Nõmme United U21 emerge as champions, finishing seven points clear of the second-placed Pärnu JK Vaprus U21. At the other end of the table, JK Tabasalu U21 and Saue JK were relegated after finishing in the bottom two. The third from last place went to Raplamaa JK, who managed to be ahead of Saue by only head-to-head games. On the individual front, Oliver Karlson of Tallinna FC Zapoos claimed the top scorer title, netting 23 goals to lead the scoring charts.

Group A (North & East)
Pos	Team	Pld	Pts
1	Maardu Linnameeskond (C, P)	26	72
2	Põhja-Tallinna JK Puuma & JK Volta ÜM	26	61
3	Rakvere JK Tarvas	26	55
4	Tallinna FCI Levadia U19	26	55
5	Viimsi JK II	26	39
6	FC Tallinn U21	26	38
7	Tartu JK Welco II	26	37
8	FA Tartu Kalev U21	26	34
9	Tartu FC Helios	26	34
10	Võru FC Helios	26	32
11	Sillamäe FC NPM Silmet	26	27
12	FC Elva II	26	20
13	Tallinna FC Ararat (R)	26	11
14	Lasnamäe FC Ajax (R)	26	6

Source: EJL
(C) Champions; (P) Promoted; (R) Relegated

Group B (South & West)
Pos	Team	Pld	Pts
1	FC Nõmme United U21 (C, P)	26	63
2	Pärnu JK Vaprus U21	26	56
3	Keila JK	26	45
4	Saku Sporting	26	41
5	Harju JK Laagri U21	26	40
6	Vändra JK Vaprus	26	38
7	Tallinna FC Zapoos	26	37
8	Tallinna FC Flora U19	26	32
9	Paide Linnameeskond III	26	32
10	FC Hiiumaa & Läänemaa JK II	26	32
11	Tabasalu Ulasabat C.F.	26	31
12	Raplamaa JK	26	23
13	Saue JK (R)	26	23
14	JK Tabasalu U21 (R)	26	19

Source: EJL
(C) Champions; (P) Promoted; (R) Relegated

Post-season games:
The II Liiga relegation play-outs were not held in 2024 due to a lack of clubs interested in promotion from the lower divisions. Similarly, the championship match between the winners of the league's two groups was canceled after FC Nõmme United U21 was forced to forfeit due to an insufficient number of available players.

===== III liiga =====
Group A (North)
Pos	Team	Pld	Pts
1	Tallinna FC Starmedia (C)	20	53
2	Tallinna FC Tamper	20	39
3	Tallinna SC ReUnited	20	39
4	Tallinna FC Hell Hunt	20	39
5	Tallinna FC Smsraha	20	31
6	Tallinna FC Maksatransport	20	30
7	Tallinna FC Eston Villa	20	26
8	Tallinna JK Piraaja	20	24
9	Tallinna FC Zenit	20	18
10	Tallinna JK Metropol (D)	20	24
11	Tallinna KSK FC Štrommi (D)	20	0

Source: EJL
(C) Champions; (D) Disqualified

Group B (South)
Pos	Team	Pld	Pts
1	Põlva FC Lootos (C)	18	43
2	Tartu Team Helm	18	42
3	Viljandi JK Tulevik II	18	40
4	Jõgeva SK Noorus-96	18	39
5	Tartu JK Welco X	18	31
6	Tartu FC Inter	18	22
7	FC Vastseliina	18	20
8	Tõrva JK	18	12
9	FC Otepää	18	12
10	Valga FC Warrior	18	3

Source: EJL
(C) Champions

Group C (East)
Pos	Team	Pld	Pts
1	Raasiku FC Joker (C)	20	51
2	Türi Ganvix JK	20	51
3	Kohtla-Järve Linnameeskond	20	37
4	FC Kose	20	35
5	JK Kuusalu Kalev	20	35
6	Märjamaa Kompanii	20	29
7	Rakvere JK Tarvas II	20	26
8	JK Loo	20	24
9	FC Maardu Aliens	20	20
10	FC Järva-Jaani	20	8
11	FC Lootus Järve Jalgpallikool	20	6

Source: EJL
(C) Champions

Group D (West)
Pos	Team	Pld	Pts
1	JK Tallinna Kalev Juunior (C)	20	52
2	Kristiine JK	20	52
3	Tallinna FC Zealot Sporting	20	37
4	Rummu Dünamo	20	34
5	Vändra JK Vaprus II	20	32
6	Pärnu JK Poseidon	20	29
7	Rumori Calcio Tallinn	20	29
8	Pärnu JK Vaprus III	20	23
9	Saku Sporting II	20	14
10	Tallinna FC Flora U18	20	10
11	Läänemaa JK Haapsalu	20	4

Source: EJL
(C) Champions

Champion's match:

19 October Semifinal	Tallinna FC Starmedia	7–1	Raasiku FC Joker	Tallinn, Estonia
17:30 UTC+03	Denis Ruus 24' (pen.); Sergei Mištšenko 36'; Mihhail Tõsjatov 38'; Daniel Gasinksi 74', 88'; Artur Dolin 80'; Markus Heikki Tapio Sjöblom 84'	Report	10' Ergo Teino	Stadium: Infoneti Lasnamäe staadion Attendance: 105; Referee: Eeri-Clyde Arro

19 October Semifinal	JK Tallinna Kalev Juunior	w/o	Põlva FC Lootos	Tallinn, Estonia
				Stadium: Raja jalgpallihall

26 October Final	Tallinna FC Starmedia	5–2	JK Tallinna Kalev Juunior	Tallinn, Estonia
19:30 UTC+03	Anton Bolodin 16', 27'; Daniel Gasinski 48'; Artemi Butajev 87'; Sergei Mištšenko 90+2'	Report	62' Lucas Kris Leis; 44' Bruno Sergio Treufeld	Stadium: Infoneti Lasnamäe staadion Attendance: 143; Referee: Erkki Seinre

===== IV liiga =====
Group A (North / East)
Pos	Team	Pld	Pts
1	Tallinna Mustamäe Jalgpalliklubi (C)	22	51
2	Tallinna FC Olympic	22	47
3	Tallinna FC Soccernet	22	43
4	Põhja-Tallinna JK Volta II & JK Arsenal	22	39
5	Jõgeva SK Noorus-96 II	22	35
6	Kohila Püsivus	22	33
7	FC Toompea	22	29
8	Aruküla FC Vigri	22	27
9	Tallinna FC Eston Villa II	22	27
10	Tallinna Maksatransport II	22	25
11	FC Kose II	22	24
12	Tallinna FC GameSport	22	1

Source: EJL
(C) Champions

Group B (North / West)
Pos	Team	Pld	Pts
1	Tabasalu Ulasabat C.F. II (C)	18	49
2	FC Tallinna Wolves	18	39
3	FCP Pärnu	18	31
4	Saue JK II	18	26
5	Tallinna JK Jalgpallihaigla	18	26
6	Tallinna FC EstHam United	18	25
7	Rumori Calcio II Tallinn	18	23
8	Pärnu JK Poseidon II	18	16
9	Tallinna FC Wise	18	13
10	Tallinna FC Reaal	18	11

Source: EJL
(C) Champions

Champion's match:

26 October Final	Tabasalu Ulasabat C.F. II	2–1	Tallinna Mustamäe Jalgpalliklubi	Tallinn, Estonia
17:00	Gregory Piiber 37', 73' (pen.)	Report	17' Stuart Serednitskiy	Stadium: Tabasalu Arena; Attendance: 134; Referee: Jakob Laiv

==== Women ====
===== Naiste Meistriliiga =====
Pos	Team	Pld	W	D	L	GF	GA	GD	Pts	Promotion, qualification or relegation
1	Tallinna FC Flora	26	25	1	0	107	10	+97	76	Qualification for the Champions League first qualifying round
2	Saku Sporting	26	13	5	8	49	42	+7	44	
3	JK Tabasalu	26	12	4	10	60	38	+22	40	
4	Tartu JK Tammeka	26	11	2	13	56	61	−5	35	
5	JK Tallinna Kalev	26	9	5	12	33	46	−13	32	
6	Viimsi JK	26	9	3	14	34	60	−26	30	
7	Tallinna FC Ararat	21	6	3	12	35	54	−19	21	Qualification for the relegation tournament
8	Põlva FC Lootos	21	1	3	17	17	80	−63	6	Qualification for the relegation tournament

Source: EJL
Rules for classification: 1) Points; 2) Less matches awarded against; 3) Head-to-head points; 4) Head-to-head goal difference; 5) Matches won; 6) Goal difference; 7) Goals scored; 8) Away goals scored; 9) Fairplay ranking.
Locations of the 2023 Naiste Meistriliiga teams

Relegation tournament:

Pos	Team	Pld	W	D	L	GF	GA	GD	Pts	Promotion, qualification or relegation
1	Tallinna FC Ararat	4	2	1	1	12	7	+5	7	Promotion to Naiste Meistriliiga
2	FC Elva	4	2	0	2	4	6	−2	6	Promotion to Naiste Meistriliiga
3	Põlva FC Lootos	4	1	1	2	6	9	−3	4	Relegation to Naiste Esiliiga
4	Nõmme Kalju FC	0	0	0	0	0	0	0	0	Relegation to Naiste Esiliiga

Source: EJL
Rules for classification: 1) Points; 2) Less matches awarded against; 3) Head-to-head points; 4) Head-to-head goal difference; 5) Matches won; 6) Goal difference; 7) Goals scored; 8) Away goals scored; 9) Fairplay ranking.

===== Naiste Esiliiga =====
Pos	Team	Pld	W	D	L	GF	GA	GD	Pts	Promotion, qualification or relegation
1	Nõmme Kalju FC	18	13	3	2	52	19	+33	42	Qualification for the promotion tournament
2	FC Elva	18	10	6	2	66	21	+45	36	Qualification for the promotion tournament
3	Tallinna FC Flora II	18	9	5	4	56	26	+30	32	
4	JK Tabasalu II	18	8	4	6	35	27	+8	28	
5	Tallinna FC Levadia	18	6	4	8	48	40	+8	22	
6	JK Tallinna Kalev II	18	2	3	13	19	86	−67	9	
7	Saku Sporting II	18	2	1	15	16	73	−57	7	

Source: EJL
Rules for classification: 1) Points; 2) Less matches awarded against; 3) Head-to-head points; 4) Head-to-head goal difference; 5) Matches won; 6) Goal difference; 7) Goals scored; 8) Away goals scored; 9) Fairplay ranking.
Locations of the 2023 Naiste Esiliiga teams

===== Naiste Teine liiga =====
Pos	Team	Pld	W	D	L	GF	GA	GD	Pts
1	Tallinna FC Flora III	18	13	4	1	59	17	+42	43
2	Viimsi JK II	18	10	3	5	48	45	+3	33
3	Tartu JK Tammeka II	18	10	3	5	67	30	+37	33
4	Jõhvi FC Phoenix & JK Narva Trans ÜM	18	8	4	6	28	28	0	28
5	Tallinna FC Levadia II	18	6	3	9	36	24	+12	21
6	Paide Linnameeskond	18	3	5	10	23	51	−28	14
7	FC Jõgeva Wolves	18	1	2	15	9	75	−66	5

Source: EJL
Rules for classification: 1) Points; 2) Less matches awarded against; 3) Head-to-head points; 4) Head-to-head goal difference; 5) Matches won; 6) Goal difference; 7) Goals scored; 8) Away goals scored; 9) Fairplay ranking.

=== Futsal ===
==== Men ====
===== Coolbet saaliliiga =====
Main phase:

Pos	Team	Pld	W	D	L	GF	GA	GD	Pts	Promotion, qualification or relegation
1	Tallinna FC Bunker Partner	14	11	0	3	102	38	+64	33	Championship play-off quarterfinal
2	Viimsi FC Qarabag	14	10	2	2	71	36	+35	32	Championship play-off quarterfinal
3	Sillamäe FC NPM Silmet	14	10	1	3	98	42	+56	31	Championship play-off quarterfinal
4	Tartu vald Ravens Futsal	14	10	0	4	108	45	+63	30	Championship play-off quarterfinal
5	Jõhvi FC Phoenix	14	5	2	7	62	78	−16	17	Championship play-off quarterfinal
6	Narva United FC	14	5	1	8	57	56	+1	16	Championship play-off quarterfinal
7	Rummu Dünamo	14	2	0	12	46	129	−83	6	Relegation play-offs
8	FC Jõgeva Wolves	14	0	0	14	44	164	−120	0	Relegation

Source: EJL
Rules for classification: 1) Points; 2) Less matches awarded against; 3) Head-to-head points; 4) Head-to-head goal difference; 5) Matches won; 6) Goal difference; 7) Goals scored; 8) Draw.
Locations of the 2023-24 Coolbet Saaliliiga teams

Play-offs:

Quarterfinal
3	Sillamäe FC NPM Silmet	8	7	X	2
6	Narva United FC	1	1	X	0
4	Tartu vald Ravens Futsal	8	5	X	2
5	Jõhvi FC Phoenix	3	3	X	0

Semifinal
2	Viimsi FC Qarabag	4	3	1	0
3	Sillamäe FC NPM Silmet	10	9	4	2
1	Tallinna FC Bunker Partner	-	7	6	2
4	Tartu vald Ravens Futsal	2	2	1	1

Final
3	Sillamäe FC NPM Silmet	9	3	7	3
1	Tallinna FC Bunker Partner	3	2	5	0
3rd place
2	Viimsi FC Qarabag	3
4	Tartu vald Ravens Futsal	0

Relegation play-off:

Team 1	Agg.	Team 2	1st leg	2nd leg
Saku Sporting (Esiliiga 3rd)	15–6	Rummu Dünamo (Coolbet Saaliliiga 7th)	5–2	10–4

=== Beach ===
==== Men ====
===== Läänemere rannajalgpalliliiga =====
In 2024, nine beach soccer clubs will compete for the Baltic Sea League ("Läänemere liiga") title, with four of the teams hailing from Estonia and one team each from Denmark, Lithuania, Latvia, Germany, and Sweden.. The league comprises three stages: the first stage was held on July 13-14 in Pärnu at Düün Beach, the second stage will take place in Germany from July 28-29, and the final stage will be hosted in Pärnu from August 23-24.

Pos	Team	Pld	W	W+	WP	LP	L	GF	GA	GD	Pts
1	(Germany) Rostock Robben	8	6	0	1	0	1	49	25	+24	19
2	(Estonia) SK Augur Enemat/Coolbet	8	6	0	0	0	2	32	26	+6	18
3	(Denmark) BSC Copenhagen	8	5	1	0	0	2	30	22	+8	17
4	(Latvia) Riga FC	8	5	0	0	0	3	31	25	+6	15
5	(Estonia) Nõmme BSC Olybet	8	3	0	0	0	5	19	31	−12	9
6	(Estonia) BSC Pärnu Tervis	8	1	1	2	0	4	18	27	−9	7
7	(Estonia) BSC Thunder Arvutitark	8	1	0	1	0	6	27	35	−8	4
8	(Sweden) Bemannia FC Stockholm	8	2	0	0	0	6	24	34	−10	6
9	(Lithuania) BSC Kaunas-Top Sport	8	1	0	0	0	7	21	26	−5	3

Source: jalgpall.ee

== Cup competitions ==
=== Association football ===
==== Men ====
===== Tipneri karikavõistlused =====
Quarterfinals
PL	Tallinna FCI Levadia	2
PL	Tallinna FC Flora	1
ELB	Läänemaa JK	0
EL	Viimsi JK	3
PL	Paide Linnameeskond	2
PL	FC Kuressaare	0
PL	Nõmme Kalju FC	2
PL	JK Tallinna Kalev	1

Semifinals
PL	Tallinna FCI Levadia^{AET}	1
EL	Viimsi JK	0
PL	Paide Linnameeskond	3
PL	Nõmme Kalju FC	1

Final
PL	Tallinna FCI Levadia	4
PL	Paide Linnameeskond	2

Home teams listed on top of bracket. (AET): At Extra Time, (PL): Premium liiga, (EL): Esiliiga, (ELB): Esiliiga B

===== Small Cup =====
Quarterfinals
II	Maardu Linnameeskond	4
II	Tabasalu Ulasabat F.C.	0
III	Tallinna FC Maksatransport	+
RL	FC Kohvile	-
III	Rummu Dünamo	2
III	JK Tallinna Kalev Juunior	1
II	Paide Linnameeskond III	4
III	Tallinna JK Metropol	1

Semifinals
II	Maardu Linnameeskond	6
III	Tallinna FC Maksatransport	0
III	Rummu Dünamo	2
II	Paide Linnameeskond III	3

Final
II	Maardu Linnameeskond	1 (4)
II	Paide Linnameeskond III	1 (5)

Home teams listed on top of bracket. (II): II liiga, (III): III liiga, (RL): Rahvaliiga

==== Women ====
Quarterfinals
EL	Tallinna FC Flora II	0
ML	Tallinna FC Flora	10
ML	Viimsi JK	1
ML	Saku Sporting^{AET}	3
ML	JK Tallinna Kalev	+
–	Pärnu JK Vaprus & Viljandi JK Tulevik	-
ML	JK Tabasalu	3
ML	Tartu Tammeka	0

Semifinals
ML	Tallinna FC Flora	2
ML	Saku Sporting	0
ML	JK Tallinna Kalev	0
ML	JK Tabasalu	2

Final
ML	FC Flora	2
ML	JK Tabasalu	0

Home teams listed on top of bracket. (AET): At Extra Time, (PL): Premium liiga, (ELB): Esiliiga B

=== Futsal ===
==== Men ====
Quarterfinals
CS	Tallinna FC Bunker Partner	9
EL	Saku Sporting	0
CS	Viimsi FC Qarabag	1
CS	Sillamäe FC NPM Silmet	6
EL	Kopli City FC	8
EL	Sillamäe FC NPM Silmet II	2
CS	Jõhvi FC Phoenix	7
CS	FC Jõgeva Wolves	1

Semifinals
CS	Tallinna FC Bunker Partner	4
CS	Sillamäe FC NPM Silmet	7
EL	Kopli City FC	2
CS	Jõhvi FC Phoenix	3

Final
CS	Sillamäe FC NPM Silmet	7
CS	Jõhvi FC Phoenix	5

Home teams listed on top of bracket. (AET): At Extra Time, (CS): Coolbet Saaliliiga, (EL): Saalijalgpalli Esiliiga

== European competitions ==
=== Association football ===
==== Men ====
July 10 Champions League Q1	Tallinna FC Flora (Estonia)	0–5	(Slovenia) NK Celje	Tallinn, Estonia
19:00		Report	7' Matko; 10' Vuklišević; 45+1' Zabukovnik; 71' Aarons; 90' Svetlin	Stadium: Lilleküla Stadium; Attendance: 2,002; Referee: Alejandro Muñiz Ruiz (Spain)

July 16 Champions League Q1	NK Celje (Slovenia)	2–1	(Estonia) Tallinna FC Flora	Celje, Slovenia
19:00	Matko 73' (pen.); Karničnik 76'	Report	12' Varjund	Stadium: Stadion Z'dežele; Referee: Goga Kikacheishvili (Georgia)

July 23 Conference League Q2	AC Virtus (San Marino)	0–0	(Estonia) Tallinna FC Flora	Serravalle, San Marino
22:00		Report		Stadium: San Marino Stadium; Attendance: 271; Referee: Dragomir Draganov (Bulgaria)

August 1 Conference League Q2	Tallinna FC Flora (Estonia)	5–2 (a.e.t.)	(San Marino) AC Virtus	Tallinn, Estonia
19:00	Lepik 4' (pen.); Sappinen 77' (pen.); Alliku 92', 97'; Kreida 120'	Report	68' Benincasa; 88' Mema	Stadium: Lilleküla Stadium; Attendance: 1,388; Referee: Snir Levy (Israel)

August 8 Conference League Q3	Víkingur Reykjavík (Iceland)	1–1	(Estonia) Tallinna FC Flora	Reykjavík, Iceland
22:15	Ingimundarson 40'	Report	21' (pen.) Lepik	Stadium: Víkingsvöllur; Attendance: 1,069; Referee: Ashot Ghaltakhchyan (Armenia)

August 15 Conference League Q3	Tallinna FC Flora (Estonia)	1–2	(Iceland) Víkingur Reykjavík	Tallinn, Estonia
18:00	Soomets 52'	Report	6' Þrándarson; 36' Hansen	Stadium: Lilleküla Stadium; Attendance: 3,028; Referee: Michal Očenáš (Slovakia)

July 11 Conference League Q1	FK Šiauliai (Lithuania)	0–2	(Estonia) Tallinna FCI Levadia	Šiauliai, Lithuania
18:00		Report	7' Musaba; 23' Felicio	Stadium: Savivaldybė Stadium; Attendance: 1,735; Referee: Mervan Bejtullahu (Kosovo)

July 18 Conference League Q1	Tallinna FCI Levadia (Estonia)	0–0	(Lithuania) FK Šiauliai	Tallinn, Estonia
19:00		Report		Stadium: Lilleküla Stadium; Attendance: 1,198; Referee: Lukasz Kuzma (Poland)

July 25 Conference League Q2	NK Osijek (Croatia)	5–1	(Estonia) Tallinna FCI Levadia	Osijek, Croatia
21:00	Miérez 9', 18', 27'; Guedes 34'; Bukvić 68'	Report	8' Yakovlev	Stadium: Opus Arena; Attendance: 8,028; Referee: Menelaos Antoniou (Cyprus)

August 1 Conference League Q2	Tallinna FCI Levadia (Estonia)	0–1	(Croatia) NK Osijek	Tallinn, Estonia
19:00		Report	63' Pušić	Stadium: Lilleküla Stadium; Attendance: 896; Referee: Antoine Paul Chiaramonti (Andorra)

July 11 Conference League Q1	JK Tallinna Kalev (Estonia)	1–2	(Armenia) FC Urartu	Tallinn, Estonia
19:30	Teeväli 11'	Report	28', 77' Movsesyan	Stadium: Kadriorg Stadium (Note: Tallinna Kalev play their home match at the Kadriorg Stadium, instead of their regular stadium, Kalevi Keskstaadion, which did not meet UEFA requirements.); Attendance: 1,217; Referee: Dmytro Kubriak (Ukraine)

July 18 Conference League Q1	FC Urartu (Armenia)	2–0	(Estonia) JK Tallinna Kalev	Yerevan, Armenia
18:00	Mirzoyan 12', 49'	Report		Stadium: Urartu Stadium; Attendance: 2,200; Referee: Pavle Ilić (Serbia)

July 11 Conference League Q1	Bala Town F.C. (Wales)	1–2	(Estonia) Paide Linnameeskond	Oswestry, England
18:00	Ukek 90+5' (pen.)	Report	64' Ceesay; 90+2' Medić	Stadium: Park Hall, (Note: Bala Town play their home match at Park Hall in Oswestry, instead of their regular stadium, Maes Tegid, in Bala, which did not meet UEFA requirements.); Attendance: 476; Referee: Matthew MacDermid (Scotland)

July 18 Conference League Q1	Paide Linnameeskond (Estonia)	1–1 (a.e.t.)	(Wales) Bala Town F.C.	Pärnu, Estonia
19:30	Hõim 120'	Report	12' Peate	Stadium: Pärnu Rannastaadion (Note: Paide play their home matches at Pärnu Rannastaadion in Pärnu, instead of their regular stadium, Paide linnastaadion, in Paide, which did not meet UEFA requirements.); Attendance: 1,259; Referee: Danilo Nikolić (Serbia)

July 25 Conference League Q2	Stjarnan (Iceland)	2–1	(Estonia) Paide Linnameeskond	Garðabær, Iceland
21:00	Atlason 24', 73'	Report	55' Kristal	Stadium: Stjörnuvöllur; Attendance: 561; Referee: Jérémy Müller (Luxembourg)

August 1 Conference League Q2	Paide Linnameeskond (Estonia)	4–0	(Iceland) Stjarnan	Pärnu, Estonia
19:30	Ojamaa 29'; Saarma 46'; Ceesay 57'; Lilander 85'	Report		Stadium: Pärnu Rannastaadion; Attendance: 1,380; Referee: Antoine Paul Chiaramonti (Andorra)

August 7 Conference League Q3	BK Häcken (Sweden)	6–1	(Estonia) Paide Linnameeskond	Gothenburg, Sweden
20:00	Amane 5', 6'; Layouni 35', 90+1'; Inoussa 64'; Agbonifo 89'	Report	32' Ceesay	Stadium: Bravida Arena; Attendance: 2,889; Referee: Daniyar Sakhi (Kazakhstan)

August 13 Conference League Q3	Paide Linnameeskond (Estonia)	1–1	(Sweden) BK Häcken	Tallinn, Estonia
18:30	Saarma 33'	Report	7' Lundqvist	Stadium: Lilleküla Stadium; Attendance: 1,470; Referee: Volen Chinkov (Bulgaria)

== County competition ==
The Estonian county competition is an annual competition, where all Estonian countys and the capital Tallinn play each other once a year. In 2024, only teams that did not play a match last year, will compete.

3 August Round 10	Saaremaa	v	Järvamaa	Kuressaare, Saaremaa
16:30				Stadium: Kuressaare linnastaadion

Round 10	Võrumaa	v	Ida-Virumaa

Round 10	Tartumaa	v	Valgamaa

Round 10	Lääne-Virumaa	v	Jõgevamaa

== Notable transfers ==
Players are listed in an alphabetical order. Players with an "*" behind their name have changed teams inside and outside of Meistriliiga. Player's last team is listed as "free agent" if he has not represented a team in the previous six months. Player's next team is listed as "free agent" if he has not found a new club within the following six months.

=== Inside Meistriliiga ===
Listed are players, who have joined or left a club participating in the 2024 Meistriliiga. The player must have represented the Estonian national team at least once. The list may also contain more known players, who have either changed their club inside the lower leagues or retired from football.

Name	Pos.	Age	From	To	Date	Notes	Ref

=== Outside Meistriliiga ===
Listed are all Estonian footballers, who have joined or left a foreign team.

Name	Pos.	Age	From	To	Date	Notes	Ref
Ilja Antonov	MF	31	(Romania) CS Corvinul Hunedoara	free agent	30.01	Terminated his contract with Corvinul.	
Ilja Antonov	MF	31	free agent	(Kuwait) Al-Shabab SC	01.07	Signed a 1 year contract with Al-Shabab.	
Karl Jakob Hein	GK	22	(England) Arsenal F.C.	(Spain) Real Valladolid	13.08	Signed a 1 year loan deal with Valladolid.	
Matvei Igonen	GK	27	(Bulgaria) FC Hebar Pazardzhik	(Bulgaria) Botev Plovdiv	27.01	Signed a 2.5 year contract with Botev.	
Oliver Jürgens	FW	20	(Hungary) Újpest FC	(Slovakia) FC DAC 1904 Dunajská Streda	30.01	Signed a 3.5 year contract with DAC.	
Oliver Jürgens	FW	21	(Slovakia) FC DAC 1904 Dunajská Streda	(Spain) SD Ponferradina	20.08	Signed a contract with Ponferradina.	
Tristan Koskor	FW	28	JK Narva Trans	(Italy) Asti Calcio FC	08.02	Signed a contract with Asti.	
Märten Kuusk	DF	27	(Hungary) Újpest FC	(Poland) GKS Katowice	15.01	Signed a 1.5+1 year contract with Katowice.	
Michael Lilander	DF	26	FC Flora	(Republic of Ireland) Bohemian F.C.	27.01	Signed a 2 year contract with Bohemian.	
Martin Miller	MF	26	FC Flora	(Republic of Ireland) Bohemian F.C.	27.01	Signed a 2 year contract with Bohemian.	
Kevor Palumets	MF	21	(Belgium) S.V. Zulte Waregem	(Finland) HJK Helsinki	03.07	Signed a 0.5 year loan deal with HJK.	
Markus Poom	MF	24	FC Flora	(Republic of Ireland) Shamrock Rovers F.C.	06.01	Signed a 1 year loan deal with Shamrock.	
Sten Reinkort	FW	25	FC Flora	(Republic of Ireland) Bohemian F.C.	09.01	Signed a 2 year contract with Bohemian.	
Sten Reinkort	FW	26	(Republic of Ireland) Bohemian F.C.	(Turkey) Şanlıurfaspor	15.07	Terminated his contract with Bohemian. Signed a 1+1 year contract with Şanlıurfaspor.	
Sten Reinkort	FW	26	(Turkey) Şanlıurfaspor	free agent	30.08	Terminated his contract with Şanlıurfaspor.	
Erik Sorga	FW	25	(Azerbaijan) Sumgayit FK	(Vietnam) Ho Chi Minh City FC	02.09	Signed a 2 year contract with HCMC.	
Aleksandr Šapovalov	FW	20	FC Flora	(Greece) PAOK B	16.01	Signed a 0.5 year loan deal with PAOK B.	
Aleksandr Šapovalov	FW	21	FC Flora	(Greece) Niki Volos F.C.	06.09	Signed a 1 year contract with Niki Volos.	
Andreas Vaher	DF	19	(Germany) SC Freiburg II	(Finland) HJK Helsinki	24.01	Signed a 0.5+2 year contract with HJK.	
Nikita Vassiljev	MF	20	FCI Levadia	(Slovakia) FC ŠTK 1914 Šamorín	07.07	Signed a 1 year loan deal with Šamorin.	
Bogdan Vaštšuk	MF	28	(Serbia) FK Voždovac	(Kuwait) Al-Shabab SC	29.01	Signed a 1 year contract with Al-Shabab.	
Martin Vetkal	MF	20	(Italy) AS Roma Primavera	(Sweden) IF Brommapojkarna	20.08	Signed a 3 year contract with Brommapojkarna.	
Sten Jakob Viidas	FW	21	Paide Linnameeskond	(Finland) KPV	27.02	Signed a 1 year loan deal with KPV.	

=== Foreign players ===
Listed are all foreign players that have joined or left a team participating in the 2024 Meistriliiga.

Name	Pos.	Age	From	To	Date	Notes	Ref
(Slovakia) Martin Adamec	MF	25	(Slovakia) KFC Komárno	FC Nõmme United	08.07	Signed a contract with United.	
(France) Réginald Mbu Alidor	MF	30	JK Narva Trans	Nõmme Kalju FC	23.02	Signed a 1 year contract with Kalju.	
(Brazil) Alexandre	MF	21	(Brazil) Clube Atlético Mineiro U20	FCI Levadia	01.03	Signed a contract with Levadia.	
(Guinea) Mousta Bah	FW	18	(Spain) Girona FC U19	FCI Levadia	02.07	Signed a contract with Levadia.	
(Georgia (country)) Zakaria Beglarishvili	MF	33	(Georgia (country)) FC Gagra	JK Narva Trans	01.01	Signed a 1 year contract with Trans.	
(Cameroon) Mollo Bessala	FW	20	FCI Levadia	(Ukraine) FC LNZ Cherkasy	26.01	Sold to Cherkasy and signed a 2.5 year contract.	
(Poland) Eugenio Bracelli	DF	22	Tartu JK Tammeka	(Romania) CSM Ceahlăul Piatra Neamț	01.07	Signed a contract with Ceahlăul.	
(Georgia (country)) Shalva Burjanadze	DF	25	(Georgia (country)) FC Gagra	JK Narva Trans	28.01	Signed a 1 year contract with Trans.	
(The Gambia) Abdoulie Ceesay	FW	20	(The Gambia) Real de Banjul FC	Paide Linnameeskond	05.07	Signed a 0.5 year loan deal with Paide.	
(The Gambia) Ousman Ceesay	FW	19	(The Gambia) Falcons FC	FC Nõmme United	12.07	Signed a 0.5 year loan deal with United.	
(The Gambia) Babou Cham	MF	24	Paide Linnameeskond	free agent	01.01	Contract with Paide ended.	
(Nigeria) Promise David	FW	22	Nõmme Kalju FC	(Belgium) Royale Union Saint-Gilloise	02.07	Sold to USG and signed a 3+1 year contract.	
(Germany) Milan Delevic	DF	26	(Serbia) FK IMT	Paide Linnameeskond	01.07	Signed a 0.5 year contract with Paide.	
(Canada) Kelsey Egwu	DF	20	(Canada) FC London	JK Narva Trans	24.01	Signed a 2 year contract with Trans.	
(Cameroon) Ngu Abega Enyang	FW	20	(Uzbekistan) FC Turon	Paide Linnameeskond	02.02	Signed a 1 year contract with Paide.	
(Ghana) David Epton	MF	18	(Ghana) Mountaineers FC	Tartu JK Tammeka	01.03	Signed a 2 year contract with Tammeka.	
(Trinidad and Tobago) Dre Fortune	MF	27	Nõmme Kalju FC	free agent	01.01	Contract with Kalju terminated.	
(France) Marlone Foubert	DF	21	(Spain) CD Manchego Ciudad Real	Nõmme Kalju FC	17.07	Signed a 2.5 year contract with Kalju.	
(Nigeria) Ahmad Gero	FW	24	(Denmark) Thisted FC	FCI Levadia	08.02	Signed a contract with Levadia.	
(Senegal) Mechini Gomis	FW	22	(Qatar) Lusail SC	Paide Linnameeskond	30.06	Loan deal with Lusail ended.	
(Senegal) Mouhamed Gueye	DF	20	(Senegal) Diambars FC	Paide Linnameeskond	13.07	Signed a contract with Paide.	
(Japan) Koki Hayashi	MF	22	(Japan) Hosei University academy	Nõmme Kalju FC	28.02	Signed a 1 year contract with Kalju.	
(United States) Zyen Jones	FW	23	Nõmme Kalju FC	(Slovakia) FC Košice	01.01	Contract with Kalju ended. Signed a 1.5 year contract with Košice.	
(Slovakia) Jakub Luka	DF	20	(Slovakia) MFK Ružomberok	FC Nõmme United	14.02	Signed a 1 year loan deal with United.	
(France) Yohan Mannone	DF	28	Nõmme Kalju FC	(Luxembourg) FC Wiltz 71	01.07	Signed a contract with Wiltz.	
(Ukraine) Illya Markovskyi	FW	26	FCI Levadia	free agent	01.01	Contract with Levadia ended.	
(Ukraine) Danyl Mashchenko	DF	21	Harju JK Laagri	Nõmme Kalju FC	24.02	Signed a 1 year contract with Kalju.	
(Serbia) Predrag Medic	MF	25	(Serbia) FK Voždovac	Paide Linnameeskond	12.01	Signed a 2 year contract with Paide.	
(Netherlands) Dehninio Muringen	DF	25	Paide Linnameeskond	free agent	01.07	Contract with Paide ended.	
(Netherlands) Richie Musaba	MF	23	free agent	FCI Levadia	17.02	Signed a contract with Levadia.	
(Latvia) Ivans Patrikejevs	MF	18	(Latvia) FK Liepāja	Nõmme Kalju FC	15.07	Signed a 0.5 year loan deal with Kalju.	
(Ukraine) Mykhaylo Plokhotnyuk	FW	25	(Romania) CSC Dumbrăvița	FC Nõmme United	14.02	Signed a 1 year contract with United.	
(Belgium) Olivier Rommens	MF	28	Nõmme Kalju FC	(Malta) Balzan F.C.	12.01	Contract with Kalju terminated. Signed a 0.5 year contract with Balzan.	
(Brazil) Eriks Santos	DF	28	(Malta) Għajnsielem F.C.	JK Narva Trans	16.07	Signed a 0.5 year contract with Trans.	
(Brazil) Lucas Serravalle	FW	21	(Brazil) Grêmio Esportivo Juventus	Nõmme Kalju FC	01.07	Signed a 0.5 year loan deal with Kalju.	
(France) Dominique Simon	MF	23	Paide Linnameeskond	(Georgia (country)) FC Dinamo Tbilisi	30.01	Contract with Paide ended. Signed a contract with Dinamo.	
(Argentina) Facundo Stefanazzi	FW	25	(Italy) ASD Calcio San Cataldo	FC Nõmme United	12.07	Signed a contract with United.	
(The Gambia) Muhammed Suso	FW	18	(The Gambia) Real de Banjul FC	Paide Linnameeskond	05.07	Signed a 3.5 year contract with Paide.	
(Finland) Onni Suutari	FW	20	(Finland) AC Oulu	JK Tallinna Kalev	01.03	Signed a 0.5 year loan deal with Kalev.	
(The Gambia) Bubacarr Tambedou	FW	21	Paide Linnameeskond	(Israel) Hapoel Tel Aviv F.C.	30.01	Sold to Hapoel and signed a 2.5 year contract.	
(England) Olawale Tanimowo	FW	26	free agent	Tartu JK Tammeka	01.03	Signed a 1 year contract with Tammeka.	
(The Gambia) Foday Trawally	MF	21	Paide Linnameeskond	(Turkey) Tuzlaspor	09.02	Sold to Tuzlaspor and signed a 1.5 year contract.	
(Greece) Giannis Tsivelekidis	DF	24	Nõmme Kalju FC	(Greece) Athens Kallithea F.C.	01.01	Contract with Kalju ended. Signed a 0.5 year contract with Kallithea.	
(Azerbaijan) Murad Valiyev	MF	21	FCI Levadia	FC Nõmme United	19.02	Signed a 1 year loan deal with United.	
(Croatia) Roko Vukušić	DF	19	(Italy) Modena F.C. 2018	Nõmme Kalju FC	29.02	Signed a 0.5 year loan deal with Kalju.	
(Croatia) Roko Vukušić	DF	19	Nõmme Kalju FC	(Italy) Modena F.C. 2018	30.06	Loan deal with Kalju ended.	
(Ghana) Abdul Razak Yusif	DF	22	Paide Linnameeskond	(Serbia) FK Železničar Pančevo	01.07	Signed a contract with Železničar.	

=== Managerial changes ===
Listed are all clubs, who play in the top divisions (Meistriliiga, Esiliiga, Esiliiga B), and national teams who changed managers after the end of the 2024 season.

Name	Pos.	Age	From	To	Date	Notes	Ref
