= 2026 FC Flora season =

Flora
2026 season
- President: Pelle Pohlak
- Manager: (Estonia) Konstantin Vassiljev
- Stadium: A. Le Coq Arena
- Meistriliiga: 2nd
- 2025-26 Estonian Cup: Winners
- Estonian Supercup: Runners Up
- UEFA Champions League: First qualifying round
- UEFA Europa Conference League: Second qualifying round
Home colours	Away colours
- All statistics correct as of 27 July 2026.

This season will be FC Flora 36th season in the clubs history.During this season the club will participate in the following competitions: 2026 Meistriliiga, 2025-26 Estonian Cup, UEFA Champions League, UEFA Europa Conference League.

== First-team squad ==
As of 15 July 2026.

Note: Flags indicate national team as defined under FIFA eligibility rules; some limited exceptions apply. Players may hold more than one non-FIFA nationality.

No.	Pos.	Nation	Player
2	DF	EST	Nikita Kalmõkov
3	DF	EST	Airon Kollo
4	DF	EST	Matvei Jekimov
5	DF	EST	Andreas Vaher
6	DF	EST	Robert Veering
7	FW	EST	Danil Kuraksin
8	MF	EST	Tristan Toomas Teeväli
9	FW	EST	Rauno Alliku (captain)
11	FW	EST	Rauno Sappinen (vice-captain)
14	FW	EST	Tony Varjund
17	FW	EST	Taaniel Usta
18	MF	EST	Remo Valdmets

No.	Pos.	Nation	Player
20	FW	EST	Sergei Zenjov
22	GK	EST	Andero Tatrik
23	DF	EST	Mihhail Kolobov
24	DF	EST	Oscar Pihela
26	DF	EST	Sander Tovstik
29	FW	EST	Sander Alamaa
32	MF	EST	Vladislav Kreida
33	GK	EST	Evert Grünvald
67	MF	EST	Ilja Antonov
78	DF	EST	Mark Hendrik Kukk
89	MF	EST	Maksim Kalimullin
99	GK	EST	Kaur Kivila

== Competitions ==
=== Overall record ===
Competition	First match	Last match	Starting round	Final position	Record							
Competition	First match	Last match	Starting round	Final position	Pld	W	D	L	GF	GA	GD	Win %
Meistriliiga	7 March 2026	7 November 2026	Matchday 1		33	19	1	13	63	47	+16	57.58
2025–26 Estonian Cup	10 March 2026	23 May 2026	Quarter Finals	Winners	3	3	0	0	9	2	+7	100.00
2026–27 Estonian Cup									—			
Estonian Supercup	28 February 2026		Final	Runners Up	1	0	0	1	1	3	−2	0.00
UEFA Champions League	8 July 2026	14 July 2026	First qualifying round	First qualifying round	2	0	1	1	4	5	−1	0.00
UEFA Europa Conference League	23 July 2026		Second qualifying round		4	1	0	3	1	7	−6	25.00
Total					43	23	2	18	78	64	+14	53.49

Last updated: 21 October 2026
Source: Eesti Jalgpalli Liit

=== Club Friendlies ===
17 January 2026 Friendly	Pärnu Vaprus (Estonia)	2 - 2	(Estonia) Flora	Pärnu
12:00	Sander Kõlvart 13'; Tristan Pajo 74' (pen.)	Report	Tovstik (yellow card) 11'; Zenjov 28'; Eerik Paltser (yellow card) 58'; Hussar (yellow card) 67'; Alliku 88'	Stadium: Pärnu Rannastaadion

25 January 2026 Friendly	AIK (Sweden)	1 - 0	(Estonia) Flora	Stockholm
15:00	Kouame 89'	Report		Stadium: Strawberry Arena

31 January 2026 Friendly	Flora (Estonia)	4 - 0	(Latvia) Daugavpils	Tallinn
13:00	Taaniel Usta 36'; Zenjov 58'; Sappinen 69'; Tristan Toomas Teeväli 84'	Report		Stadium: A. Le Coq Arena

7 February 2026 Friendly	Flora (Estonia)	1 - 0	(Latvia) Ogre United	Tallinn
11:30	Sappinen 75'	Report		Stadium: A. Le Coq Arena

14 February 2026 Friendly	Flora (Estonia)	1 - 0	(Estonia) Levadia	Tallinn
15:00	Tovstik (yellow card) 42'; Kolobov (yellow card) 71'; Oscar Pihela 85'; Kreida (yellow card) 88'	Report	Tammik (yellow card) 36'	Stadium: A. Le Coq Arena

20 February 2026 Friendly	Paide (Estonia)	1 - 3	(Estonia) Flora	Paide
18:30		Report		Stadium: Paide kunstmuruväljak

24 February 2026 Friendly	Flora (Estonia)	0 - 3	(Latvia) Riga FC	Tallinn
16:00	Remo Valdmets (yellow card) 27'; Tovstik (yellow card) 62'	Report	Contreras 16' 79'; Reginaldo Ramires 30' (yellow card) 49'; Salazar (yellow card) 51'	Stadium: A. Le Coq Arena

=== Meistriliiga ===
==== League table ====
Pos	Team	Pld	W	D	L	GF	GA	GD	Pts	Qualification or relegation
1	FCI Levadia (C, Q)	32	25	6	1	87	22	+65	81	Qualification for the Champions League first qualifying round
2	Flora	33	19	1	13	63	47	+16	58	Qualification for the Conference League first qualifying round (Note: The 2026–27 Estonian Cup winners also qualify for the Conference League first qualifying round (or the fourth-placed team of the Meistriliiga if the Estonian Cup winners finish in the top three).)
3	Paide Linnameeskond	32	17	6	9	52	39	+13	57	Qualification for the Conference League first qualifying round
4	Nõmme Kalju	32	15	6	11	54	33	+21	51	
5	Tammeka	32	15	2	15	42	51	−9	47	

Updated to match(es) played on 21 October 2026. Source: A. Le Coq Premium liiga
Rules for classification: 1) Points; 2) Less matches awarded against; 3) Head-to-head points; 4) Head-to-head goal difference; 5) Matches won; 6) Goal difference; 7) Goals scored; 8) Away goals scored; 9) Fair-play points; 10) Draw
(C) Champions; (Q) Qualified for the phase indicated

==== Results summary ====
Overall								Home						Away					
Pld	W	D	L	GF	GA	GD	Pts	W	D	L	GF	GA	GD	W	D	L	GF	GA	GD
32	19	1	12	62	44	+18	58	10	0	7	36	22	+14	9	1	5	26	22	+4

Last updated: 21 October 2026.
Source: Soccerway

===== Results by round =====
Round	1	2	3	4	5	6	7	8	9	10
Ground	H	H	A	A	H	H	A	H	A	H
Result	W	L	L	L	W					
Position	1	4	6	7	6					

Updated to match(es) played on 7 April 2026. Source: worldfootball
A = Away; H = Home; W = Win; D = Draw; L = Loss

==== Matches ====
7 March 2026 1	Flora	3-0	Nõmme United	Tallinn
11:30	Sappinen 6'; Sander Alamaa 43'; Kolobov 49'	Report	Aleksandr Alteberg (yellow card) 90'	Stadium: A. Le Coq Arena; Attendance: 522; Referee: (Estonia) Karl Koppel

15 March 2026 2	Flora	0-1	Nõmme Kalju	Tallinn
13:30	Vaher (yellow card) 1'; Kolobov (yellow card) 72'	Report	Vaher 9' (o.g.); Mashchenko (yellow card) 74'; Modou Tambedou (yellow card) 82'; Andreev (yellow card) 90+3'	Stadium: A. Le Coq Arena; Attendance: 518; Referee: (Estonia) Kristo Külljastinen

22 March 2026 3	Harju	2-0	Flora	Laagri
11:30	Binate (yellow card) 7'; Markus Kesa (yellow card) 33'; Sillamaa 51'; Danyil Rudenko (yellow card) 61'; Karel Eerme (yellow card) 89'; Karl-Erik Ennuste (yellow card) 90+1' (goal) 90+6'; Sander Soo (yellow card) 90+5'; Imre Kartau (yellow card) 90+6'	Report	Vaher (yellow card) 24'; Zenjov (yellow card) 31'	Stadium: Laagri Stadium; Attendance: 286; Referee: (Estonia) Kristjan-Eric Lääne

3 April 2026 4	Tammeka	3-1	Flora	Tartu
17:00	Tanel Lang (yellow card) 14'; Koskor 59'; Pedro Manoel 68'; Marin 86'; Carl Kiidjärv (yellow card) 89'	Report	Mark Hendrik Kukk (yellow card) 22'; Kolobov (yellow card) 45'; Antonov (yellow card) 48' (goal) 72'	Stadium: Tamme Stadium; Attendance: 423; Referee: (Estonia) Joonas Jaanovits

7 April 2026 5	Flora	2-1	Kuressaare	Tallinn
19:00	Sappinen 15'; Sander Alamaa 63'; Mark Hendrik Kukk (yellow card) 76'; Kolobov (yellow card) 85'	Report	Andero Kivi 67'	Stadium: A. Le Coq Arena; Attendance: 338; Referee: (Estonia) Kevin Kaivoja

12 April 2026 6	Flora	2-0	Vaprus	Tallinn
16:00 CEST	Kreida (yellow card) 14'; Zenjov 60'; Mark Hendrik Kukk (yellow card) 62'; Antonov 73'	Report	Lepik (yellow card) 28'; Joosep Põder (yellow card) 90+6'	Stadium: Sportland Arena; Attendance: 355; Referee: (Estonia) Kristjan-Eric Lääne

19 April 2026 7	FCI Levadia	4-0	Flora	Tallinn
13:30 CEST	Bubacarr Tambedou 9'; Roosnupp 30' (yellow card) 79'; Wendell 54'; Peetson 74'	Report	Kolobov (yellow card) 65'; Zenjov (yellow card) 66'	Stadium: Sportland Arena; Attendance: 1,039; Referee: (Estonia) Rasmus Maalinn

22 April 2026 8	Flora	6-0	Narva Trans	Tallinn
18:00 CEST	Remo Valdmets 13'; Sappinen 18'; Andero Kaares (yellow card) 20'; Nikita Kalmõkov (yellow card) 27'; Airon Kollo (yellow card) 57'; Zenjov 67'; Sergei Kondrattsev 71' (o.g.); Taaniel Usta (yellow card) 73'; Sappinen 79'; Sander Alamaa 80'	Report	Ahmad Gero (yellow card) 63'; Campagna (yellow card) 65' (yellow-red card) 87'	Stadium: Sportland Arena; Attendance: 341; Referee: (Estonia) Kristo Tohver

26 April 2026 9	Paide	1-2	Flora	Paide
13:30 CEST	Anier 2'; Abdourahman Badamosi (yellow card) 52'; Hõim (yellow card) 71'; William Gabriel (red card) 90+3'	Report	Remo Valdmets (yellow card) 36'; Kolobov (yellow card) 59'; Sappinen 62'; Zenjov (yellow card) 67'; Taaniel Usta 76'	Stadium: Paide kunstmuruväljak Attendance: 321; Referee: (Estonia) Kristo Tohver

30 April 2026 10	Flora	5-0	Harju JK Laagri	Tallinn
18:00 CEST	Kreida 5'; Sappinen 18'; Remo Valdmets 21'; Zenjov 45+1'; Taaniel Usta 62'; Tristan Toomas Teeväli (yellow card) 77'	Report		Stadium: A. Le Coq Arena; Attendance: 674; Referee: (Estonia) Tanel Üprus

=== Estonian Cup ===
10 March 2026 Quarter Finals	Flora	3 - 1	Nõmme United	Tallinn
17:00	Nikita Kalmõkov 51'; Oscar Pihela 54'; Sappinen 87'	Report	Kevin Mätas 4'; Ricky Chanda (yellow card) 67'; Oostenbrink (yellow card) 83'	Stadium: Lilleküla Stadium; Attendance: 442

==== 2026–27 ====
The tournament will continue into the 2027 season.
