= 2022–23 Estonian Cup =

Estonian football competition

Tournament details
- Country: Estonia
- Dates: 1 June 2022 – 3 June 2023
- Teams: 75

Final positions
- Champions: Narva Trans
- Runners-up: Flora

Tournament statistics
- Matches played: 74
- Goals scored: 456 (6.16 per match)

The 2022–23 Estonian Cup is the 33rd season of the Estonian main domestic football knockout tournament. Paide Linnameeskond is the defending champion.

== First Round (1/64) ==
The draw was made by Estonian Football Association on 21 May 2022.

- League level of the club in the brackets.
- Rahvaliiga – RL (people's league) is a league organized by Estonian Football Association, but not part of the main league system.

1 June 2022	FC Tallinna Wolves (5)	0–12	Tallinna FC Flora U19 (4)	Tallinn
20:00		Report		Stadium: Nike Arena; Attendance: 48; Referee: Andres Jahimaa

19 June 2022	FC Kohvile (RL)	0–5	Paide Linnameeskond III (4)	Tartu
16:00		Report		Stadium: Holm Jalgpallipark; Attendance: 27; Referee: Aleksander Kattel

22 June 2022	JK Narva Trans (1)	w/o	Tabasalu Ulasabat C.F. (5)	Narva
19:00		Report		Stadium: Narva Kreenholmi staadion Referee: Rene Merilo

22 June 2022	FA Tartu Kalev (3)	w/o	FC Puhkus Mehhikos (RL)	Ülenurme
19:00		Report		Stadium: Ülenurme staadion Referee: Ahti Lepp

22 June 2022	JK Tabasalu (3)	26–0	Pärnu JK Poseidon II (6)	Tabasalu
19:00		Report		Stadium: Tabasalu Arena; Attendance: 84; Referee: Oliver Väät

27 June 2022	Tallinna SC ReUnited (5)	3–1	JK Loo (5)	Tallinn
19:00		Report		Stadium: Nike Arena; Attendance: 37; Referee: Kristo Tohver

29 June 2022	FCI Tallinn (4)	3–1	Tallinna FC Eston Villa (5)	Tallinn
20:45		Report		Stadium: Infoneti Lasnamäe staadion Attendance: 73; Referee: Timo Künnapas

30 June 2022	Tallinna FC Olympic Olybet (5)	5–4 (a.e.t.)	FC Maardu Aliens (5)	Tallinn
19:30		Report		Stadium: Nike Arena; Attendance: 14; Referee: Martin Uusküla

3 July 2022	Tartu FC Helios (4)	w/o	Jalgpalliklubi 32. Keskkool (RL)	Tartu
17:00		Report		Stadium: Tartu Annelinna kunstmurustaadion

8 July 2022	FC Kuressaare (1)	1–0	Viimsi JK (2)	Kuressaare
19:00		Report		Stadium: Kuressaare linnastaadion Attendance: 158; Referee: Reelika Turi

8 July 2022	Tallinna JK Legion U21 (3)	10–1	Vana Hea Puur (RL)	Tallinn
19:00		Report		Stadium: Wismari jalgpallistaadion Attendance: 54; Referee: Vladimir Voskoboinikov

8 July 2022	FCP Pärnu (6)	0–3	Tallinna FC Maksatransport (5)	Pärnu
20:00		Report		Stadium: Pärnu kunstmurustaadion Attendance: 50; Referee: Rainer Väljas

9 July 2022	FC Vastseliina (5)	0–14	Tallinna JK Legion (1)	Vastseliina
16:00		Report		Stadium: Vastseliina Gümnaasiumi jalgpalliväljak Attendance: 52; Referee: Jürgen Lorenz

9 July 2022	Tartu JK Tammeka (1)	8–0	FC Kose (4)	Tartu
19:00		Report		Stadium: Tartu Tamme staadion Attendance: 173; Referee: Rait Ojanurme

=== Byes ===
These teams were not drawn and secured a place in the second round without playing:

FC Järva-Jaani, FC Nõmme United, JK Tallinna Kalev U21, JK Saare Latte (RL), Pärnu JK Vaprus, Harju JK Laagri, FC Jõgeva Wolves, FC Elva, JK Kernu Kadakas, Tallinna FC Zapoos, Maarjamäe FC Vigri, Tallinna JK Jalgpallihaigla, Tallinna FC EstHam United, Rakvere JK Tarvas, Jõhvi FC Phoenix, Saku Sporting, Tallinna JK Piraaja, Tallinna FC Zenit, Tallinna FC Teleios, Läänemaa JK, FC Tallinna Wolves, Raplamaa JK, Nõmme Kalju FC, FC Tallinn, Pärnu JK Poseidon, Tartu Team Helm, Kristiine JK, Nõmme Kalju FC U21, JK Tallinna Kalev, JK Lääneranna (RL), FC Jager (RL), Tallinna FC TransferWise, Pärnu Jalgpalliklubi, Valga FC Warrior, Viljandi JK Tulevik, FC Mulgi (RL), FC Äksi Wolves, Tallinna FC Soccernet, Märjamaa Kompanii, Tartu JK Welco, Ida-Virumaa FC Alliance, Rumori Calcio Tallinn, Tallinna FC Flora U21, Vändra JK Vaprus II ja FC Lelle ÜM

== Second round (1/32) ==
The draw for the second round was also made on 21 May 2022.

22 June 2022	Rumori Calcio Tallinn (5)	0–8	JK Tallinna Kalev (1)	Tallinn
16:00		Report		Stadium: Kotka staadion Attendance: 52; Referee: Vladimir Voskoboinikov

29 June 2022	Tallinna FC Soccernet (6)	w/o	FC Jõgeva Wolves (5)	Tallinn
19:30		Report		Stadium: Sõle kunstmuruväljak Referee: Mark-Julius Pikat

29 June 2022	Tallinna FC Zenit (5)	5–3	Pärnu JK Poseidon (5)	Tallinn
20:00		Report		Stadium: Hiiu kunstmurustaadion Attendance: 9 Referee: Teet Allas

5 July 2022	Märjamaa Kompanii (5)	0–7	Tartu Team Helm (5)	Märjamaa
19:00		107750		Stadium: Märjamaa Gümnaasiumi staadion Attendance: 57; Referee: Rainer Väljas

8 July 2022	Pärnu Jalgpalliklubi (2)	9–0	Maarjamäe FC Vigri (6)	Pärnu
19:00		Report		Stadium: Pärnu Rannastaadion; Attendance: 53; Referee: Mark-Julius Pikat

9 July 2022	FC Mulgi (RL)	w/o	FC Tallinn (3)	Karksi-Nuia
17:00		Report		Stadium: Karksi-Nuia Gümnaasiumi staadion Referee: Tomi Rahula

9 July 2022	Ida-Virumaa FC Alliance (2)	1–6	JK Tallinna Kalev U21 (3)	Kohtla-Järve
17:00		Report		Stadium: Kohtla-Järve Spordikeskuse staadion Attendance: 74; Referee: Timo Sujev

9 July 2022	Valga FC Warrior (5)	0–6	FC Elva (2)	Valga
19:00		Report		Stadium: Valga Kungla kunstmurustaadion Attendance: 71; Referee: Jako Arula

9 July 2022	FC Nõmme United (2)	3–0	Läänemaa JK (3)	Tallinn
19:00		Report		Stadium: Männiku staadion Attendance: 59; Referee: Joonas Jaanovits

9 July 2022	Harju JK Laagri (2)	29–0	Tallinna FC EstHam United (6)	Laagri
19:00		Report		Stadium: Laagri kunstmurustaadion Attendance: 52; Referee: Jakob Laiv

10 July 2022	Tallinna JK Jalgpallihaigla (5)	0–23	Nõmme Kalju FC (1)	Tallinn
16:30		Report		Stadium: Männiku kunstmuruväljak Attendance: 130; Referee: Kristjan Siilak

15 July 2022	Nõmme Kalju FC U21 (3)	9–0	Tallinna FC Teleios (6)	Tallinn
20:30		Report		Stadium: Hiiu kunstmurustaadion Attendance: 58

22 July 2022	Tallinna FC Flora U21 (2)	13–0	FC Järva-Jaani (5)	Tallinn
18:00		Report		Stadium: Lilleküla harjutusväljak I Attendance: 43; Referee: Martin Altmets

23 July 2022	Tallinna FC TransferWise (5)	0–18	Tartu JK Tammeka (1)	Tallinn
17:00		Report		Stadium: Nike Arena; Attendance: 30; Referee: Gert Kääramees

23 July 2022	FA Tartu Kalev (3)	11–0	FC Jager (RL)	Ülenurme
18:00		Report		Stadium: Ülenurme staadion Attendance: 79; Referee: Siim Suurmets

23 July 2022	Tallinna JK Piraaja (4)	w/o	Tallinna FC Flora U19 (4)	Tallinn
19:00		Report		Stadium: Sportland Arena

24 July 2022	Kristiine JK (6)	2–3	JK Lääneranna (RL)	Tallinn
16:00		Report		Stadium: Wismari jalgpallistaadion Attendance: 22; Referee: Voiteh Karnatsevitš

24 July 2022	JK Tabasalu (3)	3–1	Tartu JK Welco (3)	Tabasalu
19:00		Report		Stadium: Tabasalu Arena; Attendance: 153; Referee: Rasmus Maalinn

25 July 2022	FC Kuressaare (1)	2–2 (a.e.t.) (4–3 p)	Pärnu JK Vaprus (1)	Kuressaare
19:00		Report		Stadium: Kuressaare linnastaadion Attendance: 771; Referee: Marko Liiva

26 July 2022	FC Äksi Wolves (6)	2–3	FCI Tallinn (4)	Tabivere
18:00		Report		Stadium: Tabivere Põhikooli staadion Attendance: 51; Referee: Timo Teniste

26 July 2022	Tartu FC Helios (4)	0–9	JK Narva Trans (1)	Tartu
19:00		Report		Stadium: Tartu Annelinna kunstmurustaadion Attendance: 156; Referee: Elar Tarkus

27 July 2022	Saku Sporting (5)	0–2	Rakvere JK Tarvas (4)	Saku
19:00		Report		Stadium: Saku staadion Attendance: 52; Referee: Tomi Rahula

27 July 2022	Tallinna FC Zapoos (5)	2–1	Raplamaa JK (3)	Tallinn
20:30		Report		Stadium: Infoneti Lasnamäe staadion Attendance: 64; Referee: Martin Altmets

3 August 2022	Tallinna JK Legion (1)	13–0	JK Kernu Kadakas (6)	Tallinn
19:00		Report		Stadium: Sportland Arena; Attendance: 69; Referee: Katariina Järve

9 August 2022	Tallinna SC ReUnited (5)	4–2	Tallinna JK Legion U21 (3)	Tallinn
19:00		Report		Stadium: Nike Arena; Attendance: 52; Referee: Miko Pupart

10 August 2022	Paide Linnameeskond III (4)	4–4 (a.e.t.) (5–6 p)	Jõhvi FC Phoenix (4)	Paide
19:00		Report		Stadium: Paide linnastaadion Attendance: 18; Referee: Rene Merilo

11 August 2022	Viljandi JK Tulevik (2)	4–1	Vändra JK Vaprus II ja FC Lelle ÜM (6)	Viljandi
19:00		Report		Stadium: Viljandi linnastaadion Attendance: 75; Referee: Karl Kena

16 August 2022	Tallinna FC Olympic Olybet (5)	3–0	JK Saare Latte (RL)	Tallinn
20:00		Report		Stadium: Nike Arena; Attendance: 35; Referee: Roomet Pärn

16 August 2022	FC Tallinna Wolves (5)	0–10	Tallinna FC Maksatransport (5)	Tallinn
20:00		Report		Stadium: Wismari jalgpallistaadion Attendance: 81; Referee: Vladimir Zahharov

== Third round (1/16) ==
The draw for the third round was made on 25 July 2022.

16 August 2022	JK Tallinna Kalev (1)	15–0	Tallinna FC Soccernet (6)	Tallinn
19:15		Report		Stadium: Kalevi Keskstaadioni kunstmuruväljak Attendance: 87; Referee: Erik Reinumägi

16 August 2022	Tartu JK Tammeka (1)	8–0	Pärnu Jalgpalliklubi (2)	Tartu
19:30		Report		Stadium: Tartu Tamme staadion Attendance: 220; Referee: Jürgen Lorenz

17 August 2022	FC Kuressaare (1)	w/o	JK Lääneranna (RL)	Kuressaare
19:00		Report		Stadium: Kuressaare linnastaadion

17 August 2022	JK Narva Trans (1)	5–0	FCI Tallinn (4)	Narva
19:00		Report		Stadium: Narva Kreenholmi staadion Attendance: 155; Referee: Johann Kuldmäe

17 August 2022	FC Flora (1)	6–0	Tallinna JK Legion (1)	Tallinn
20:00		Report		Stadium: A. Le Coq Arena; Attendance: 214; Referee: Marko Liiva

18 August 2022	FC Tallinn (3)	4–1	Tallinna FC Flora U21 (2)	Tallinn
19:00		Report		Stadium: Lasnamäe Spordikompleksi kunstmurustaadion Attendance: 134; Referee: Kristjan-Eric Lääne

18 August 2022	Nõmme Kalju FC (1)	2–0	FCI Levadia (1)	Tallinn
19:00		Report		Stadium: Sportland Arena; Attendance: 378; Referee: Grigori Ošomkov

24 August 2022	FC Elva (2)	w/o	Nõmme Kalju FC U21 (3)	Elva
18:00		Report		Stadium: Elva linnastaadion

24 August 2022	Tallinna FC Zenit (5)	1–6	Viljandi JK Tulevik (2)	Kernu
19:00		Report		Stadium: Kernu Põhikooli staadion Attendance: 20; Referee: Albert Anissimov

25 August 2022	Tartu Team Helm (5)	1–4	Rakvere JK Tarvas (4)	Tartu
19:30		Report		Stadium: Tartu Sepa jalgpallikeskuse kunstmuruväljak Attendance: 250; Referee: Artis Loho

25 August 2022	JK Tallinna Kalev U21 (3)	6–2	Tallinna FC Maksatransport (5)	Tallinn
20:30		Report		Stadium: Kalevi Keskstaadioni kunstmuruväljak Attendance: 191; Referee: Rainer Väljas

14 September 2022	Tallinna FC Olympic Olybet (5)	0–5	JK Tabasalu (3)	Tallinn
19:00		Report		Stadium: Nike Arena; Attendance: 24; Referee: Gerd Ärsis

14 September 2022	Harju JK Laagri (2)	13–1	Tallinna FC Zapoos (5)	Laagri
19:00		Report		Stadium: Laagri kunstmurustaadion Attendance: 68; Referee: Kristjan-Eric Lääne

14 September 2022	Jõhvi FC Phoenix (4)	w/o	Tallinna SC ReUnited (5)	Kohtla-Järve
19:00		Report		Stadium: Kohtla-Järve kunstmuruväljak

21 September 2022	FA Tartu Kalev (3)	2–0 (a.e.t.)	Tallinna FC Flora U19 (4)	Ülenurme
17:00		Report		Stadium: Ülenurme staadion Attendance: 75; Referee: Jürgen Lorenz

19 October 2022	FC Nõmme United (2)	0–4	Paide Linnameeskond (1)	Tallinn
19:00		Report		Stadium: Sportland Arena; Attendance: 110; Referee: Kristo Külljastinen

== Fourth round (1/8) ==
11 October 2022	JK Narva Trans (1)	2–1	JK Tallinna Kalev (1)	Narva
19:00		Report		Stadium: Narva Kalev-Fama staadion Attendance: 111; Referee: Kristjan-Eric Lääne

12 October 2022	FC Flora (1)	6–0	FC Elva (2)	Tallinn
19:00		Report		Stadium: A. Le Coq Arena; Attendance: 235; Referee: Johann Kuldmäe

18 October 2022	Tartu JK Tammeka (1)	5–2	Harju JK Laagri (2)	Tartu
19:00		Report		Stadium: Tartu Tamme staadion Attendance: 190; Referee: Kevin Kaivoja

19 October 2022	FC Kuressaare (1)	5–2	FA Tartu Kalev (3)	Kuressaare
19:00		Report		Stadium: Kuressaare linnastaadion Attendance: 146; Referee: Paul Kask

19 October 2022	Jõhvi FC Phoenix (4)	1–0	Rakvere JK Tarvas (4)	Kohtla-Järve
19:00		Report		Stadium: Kohtla-Järve kunstmuruväljak Attendance: 150; Referee: Rasmus Maalinn

19 October 2022	JK Tabasalu (3)	1–0	Nõmme Kalju FC (1)	Tabasalu
19:30		Report		Stadium: Tabasalu Arena; Attendance: 311; Referee: Voiteh Karnatsevitš

19 October 2022	Viljandi JK Tulevik (2)	0–2	FC Tallinn (3)	Viljandi
20:00		Report		Stadium: Viljandi Männimäe Jalgpallihall; Attendance: 40; Referee: Maksim Ramazanov

9 November 2022	Paide Linnameeskond (1)	11–1	JK Tallinna Kalev U21 (3)	Paide
19:00		Report		Stadium: Paide kunstmuruväljak Attendance: 53; Referee: Jagnar Jakobson

== Quarter-finals ==
The draw for the quarter-finals was made on 26 February 2023. Between the 2022 and 2023 season there were changes involving remaining teams:

- JK Tabasalu and FC Tallinn both managed to get promotion after successful 2022 Esiliiga B season and now play at second-level Esiliiga
- Jõhvi FC Phoenix joined with JK Noova and was named Jõhvi FC Phoenix/JK Noova United

11 April 2023	Jõhvi FC Phoenix/JK Noova United (4)	1–6	Tartu JK Tammeka (1)	Kohtla-Järve
19:00		Report		Stadium: Kohtla-Järve kunstmuruväljak Attendance: 165; Referee: Paul Kask

11 April 2023	FC Kuressaare (1)	1–1 (a.e.t.) (3–5 p)	FC Flora (1)	Kuressaare
19:00		Report		Stadium: Kuressaare kunstmurustaadion Attendance: 143; Referee: Kristo Tohver

12 April 2023	JK Tabasalu (2)	2–1	FC Tallinn (2)	Tabasalu
19:00		Report		Stadium: Tabasalu Arena; Attendance: 294; Referee: Jagnar Jakobson

12 April 2023	JK Narva Trans (1)	0–0 (a.e.t.) (4–3 p)	Paide Linnameeskond (1)	Narva
19:00		Report		Stadium: Narva Kalev-Fama Stadium; Attendance: 317; Referee: Juri Frischer

== Semi-finals ==
The draw for the semi-finals was made on 13 April 2023.

10 May 2023	FC Flora (1)	1–0	Tartu JK Tammeka (1)	Tallinn
19:00		Report		Stadium: Sportland Arena; Attendance: 243; Referee: Karl Koppel

11 May 2023	JK Tabasalu (2)	0–1	JK Narva Trans (1)	Tabasalu
19:00		Report		Stadium: Tabasalu Arena; Attendance: 787; Referee: Martti Pukk

== Final ==
3 June 2023	FC Flora (1)	1–2	JK Narva Trans (1)	Tallinn
19:00		Report		Stadium: A. Le Coq Arena; Attendance: 1,347; Referee: Kristo Tohver
