= Sander Tovstik =

Estonian footballer (born 2006)

Personal information
- Full name: Sander Tovstik
- Date of birth: 26 March 2006 (age 20)
- Place of birth: Tallinn, Estonia
- Height: 5 ft 9 in (1.75 m)
- Position: Left-back

Team information
- Current team: Flora
- Number: 26

Youth career
- 2013–2022: Viimsi
- 2024: Flora

Senior career*
Years	Team	Apps	(Gls)
2022–2023	Viimsi II	12	(3)
2023	Viimsi	22	(3)
2024	Flora U19	3	(0)
2024	Flora U21	27	(2)
2025–	Flora	55	(3)

International career^{‡}
2024	Estonia U19	4	(0)
2025	Estonia U21	5	(0)
2026–	Estonia	1	(0)
- * Club domestic league appearances and goals as of 17 November 2026 ‡ National team caps and goals as of 31 March 2026

Sander Tovstik (born 26 March 2006) is an Estonian professional footballer who plays as a left-back for Meistriliiga club Flora and the Estonia national team.

== Club career ==
=== Flora ===
Tovstik joined Flora ahead of the 2024 season. He made his Meistriliiga debut on 1 March 2025, in a 2–2 home draw against Narva Trans.

== International career ==
Tovstik has competed for the Estonia under-19s and under-21s.

On 20 March 2026, Tovstik was called up to the Estonia squad by manager Jürgen Henn for the 2026 FIFA Series matches in Rwanda. He made his senior debut on 30 March 2026 in a 2–0 defeat to Rwanda.

== Personal life ==
Tovstik comes from a family of footballers. His father, Elar, played for Kuressaare and Tarvas, while his mother, Merlin, played for Viimsi's women's team. His uncle Alari Tovstik was also a footballer who played for Warrior, Kuressaare and Tarvas.

== Honours ==
Flora

- Meistriliiga: 2025
