= Nikita Vassiljev =

Estonian footballer (born 2003)

Personal information
- Full name: Nikita Vassiljev
- Date of birth: 7 October 2003 (age 23)
- Place of birth: Tartu, Estonia
- Position: Midfielder

Team information
- Current team: Nõmme United
- Number: 14

Youth career
- 2011–2014: Levadia
- 2015–2016: Tabasalu
- 2017–2021: Nõmme United

Senior career*
| Years | Team | Apps | (Gls) |
| 2019–2022 | Nõmme United | 82 | (9) |
| 2022–2023 | Levadia U21 | 36 | (12) |
| 2023–2025 | Levadia | 48 | (2) |
| 2024–2025 | → STK Samorin (loan) | 14 | (0) |
| 2025– | Nõmme United | 25 | (3) |

International career^{‡}
| 2021 | Estonia U19 | 2 | (0) |
| 2022– | Estonia U21 | 7 | (0) |
| 2023– | Estonia | 2 | (0) |
- * Club domestic league appearances and goals as of 17 November 2026 ‡ National team caps and goals as of 1 April 2024

Nikita Vassiljev (born 7 October 2003) is an Estonian professional footballer who plays as a midfielder for Meistriliiga club Nõmme United and the Estonia national team.

== International career ==
Vassiljev made his senior international debut for Estonia on 8 January 2023, in a 1–1 draw against Iceland in a friendly.

== Honours ==
=== Club ===
Nõmme United

- Esiliiga B: 2019
