= Mihhail Kolobov =

Estonian footballer (born 2005)

Personal information
- Full name: Mihhail Kolobov
- Date of birth: 2 March 2005 (age 21)
- Place of birth: Tallinn, Estonia
- Height: 6 ft 2 in (1.88 m)
- Position: Centre-back

Team information
- Current team: Flora
- Number: 23

Youth career
- 2012–2015: Everest
- 2016–2022: Legion

Senior career*
Years	Team	Apps	(Gls)
2021	Legion III	5	(0)
2021	Legion U21	12	(0)
2022	Legion	17	(0)
2022–2025	Flora U21	22	(1)
2022–	Flora	94	(4)

International career^{‡}
2019	Estonia U15	3	(0)
2021–2022	Estonia U17	9	(2)
2022–2023	Estonia U19	16	(0)
2024–2025	Estonia U21	4	(0)
2026–	Estonia	1	(0)
- * Club domestic league appearances and goals as of 17 November 2026 ‡ National team caps and goals as of 31 March 2026

Mihhail Kolobov (born 2 March 2005) is a professional footballer who plays as a centre-back for Meistriliiga club Flora and the Estonia national team.

== Club career ==
=== Legion ===
Kolobov came through the youth system at Legion. He made his Meistriliiga debut on 2 March 2022 in a 2–0 home defeat to Narva Trans.

=== Flora ===
Kolobov signed for Meistriliiga club Flora on 28 July 2022 on a three-year contract.

== International career ==
Kolobov has competed for the Estonia under-15s, under-17s, under-19s and under-21s.

On 20 March 2026, Kolobov was called up to the Estonia squad by manager Jürgen Henn for the 2026 FIFA Series matches in Rwanda. He made his senior debut on 30 March 2026 in a 2–0 defeat to Rwanda.

== Honours ==
Flora

- Meistriliiga: 2022, 2023, 2025
- Estonian Supercup: 2024
