= Tabasalu =

Borough in Harju County, Estonia

- Small borough
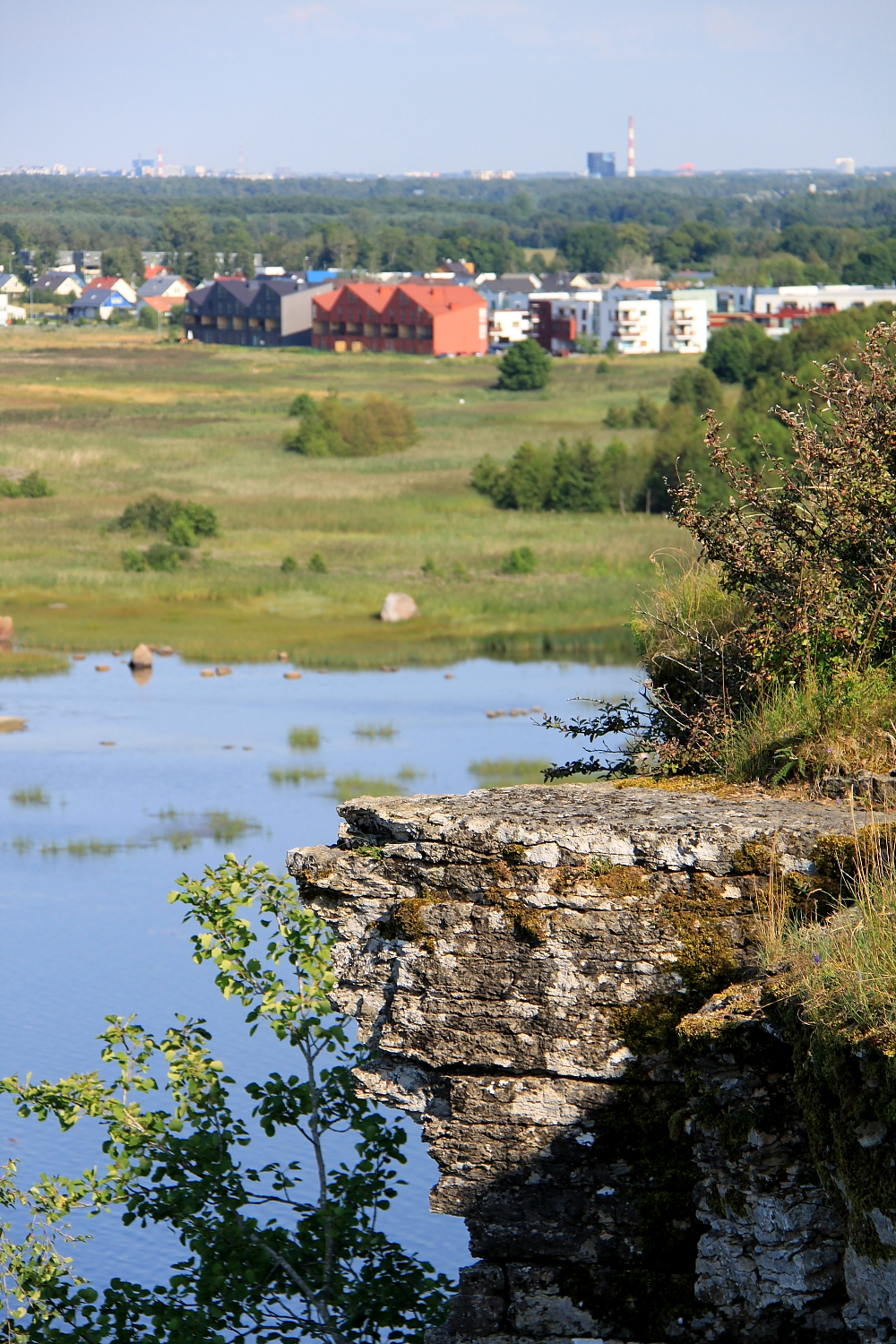
- View from Tabasalu cliff towards Tallinn.

- Location in Estonia
- Coordinates: 59°25′44″N 24°32′49″E
- Country: Estonia
- County: Harju County
- Municipality: Harku Parish

Population (August 1st 2025)
  - Total: 3,899

Tabasalu is a small borough (Estonian: alevik) in Harju County, northern Estonia, located about 13 km west from the capital Tallinn. It is the administrative centre of Harku Parish. As of 1 August 2025, the settlement's population was 3,899.

Tabasalu was first mentioned in 1317 under the name Tappeselle (Tappeselle). The territory of the Tabasalu settlement was once home to Tiskre Manor and Lucca Manor. During the Estonian SSR, the Ranna State Farm was also located in Tabasalu.

== Sport ==
The Tabasalu Arena is an multi-purpose stadium that hosts the JK Tabasalu football team. The stadium was opened in 2017 and has a capacity of 1,630.

The motorcycle speedway track located south of the borough at Nonni tee 11, Rannamõisa has held the multiple finals of the Estonian Individual Speedway Championship.

== Images ==
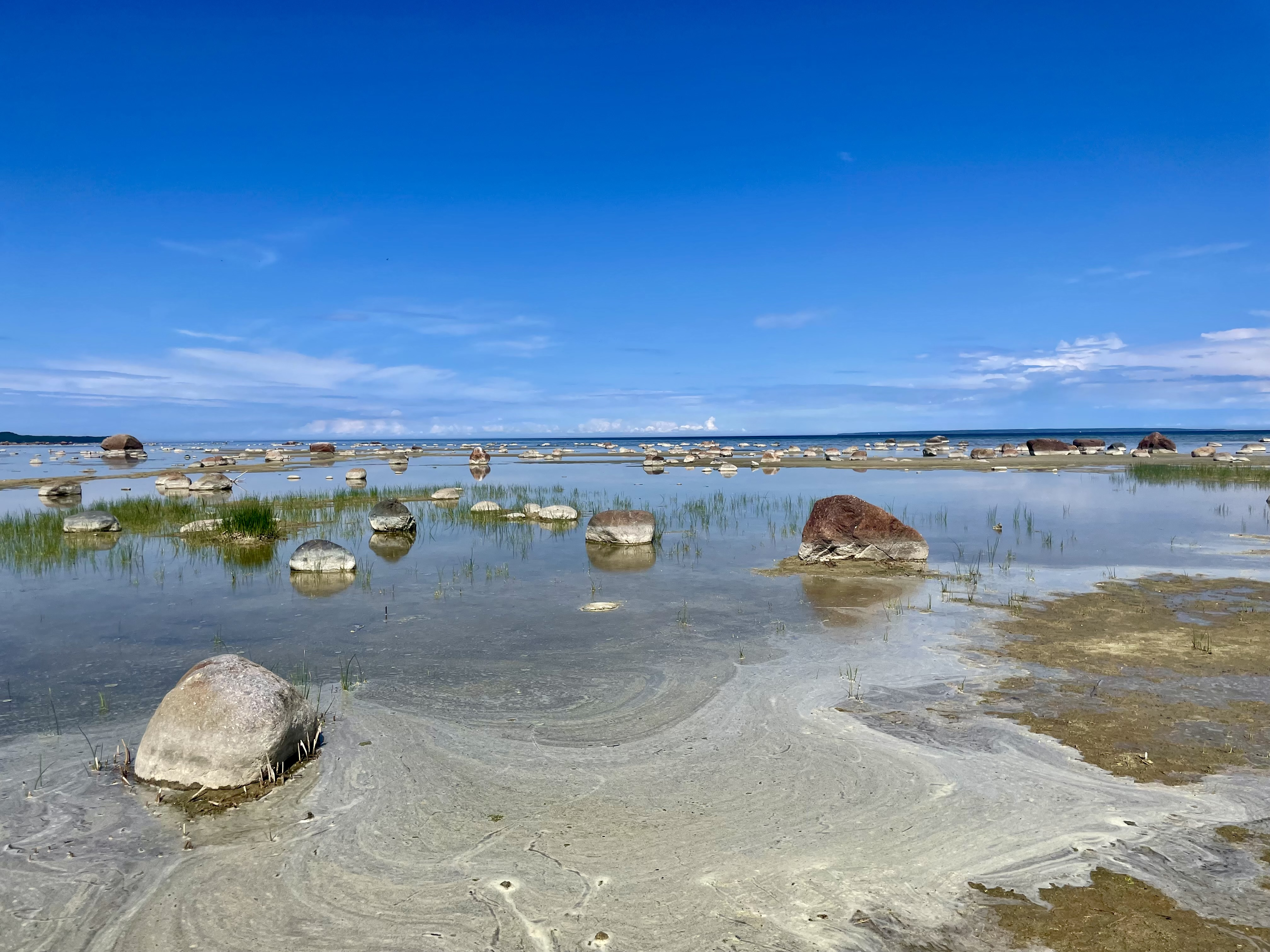
Tabasalu beach panorama

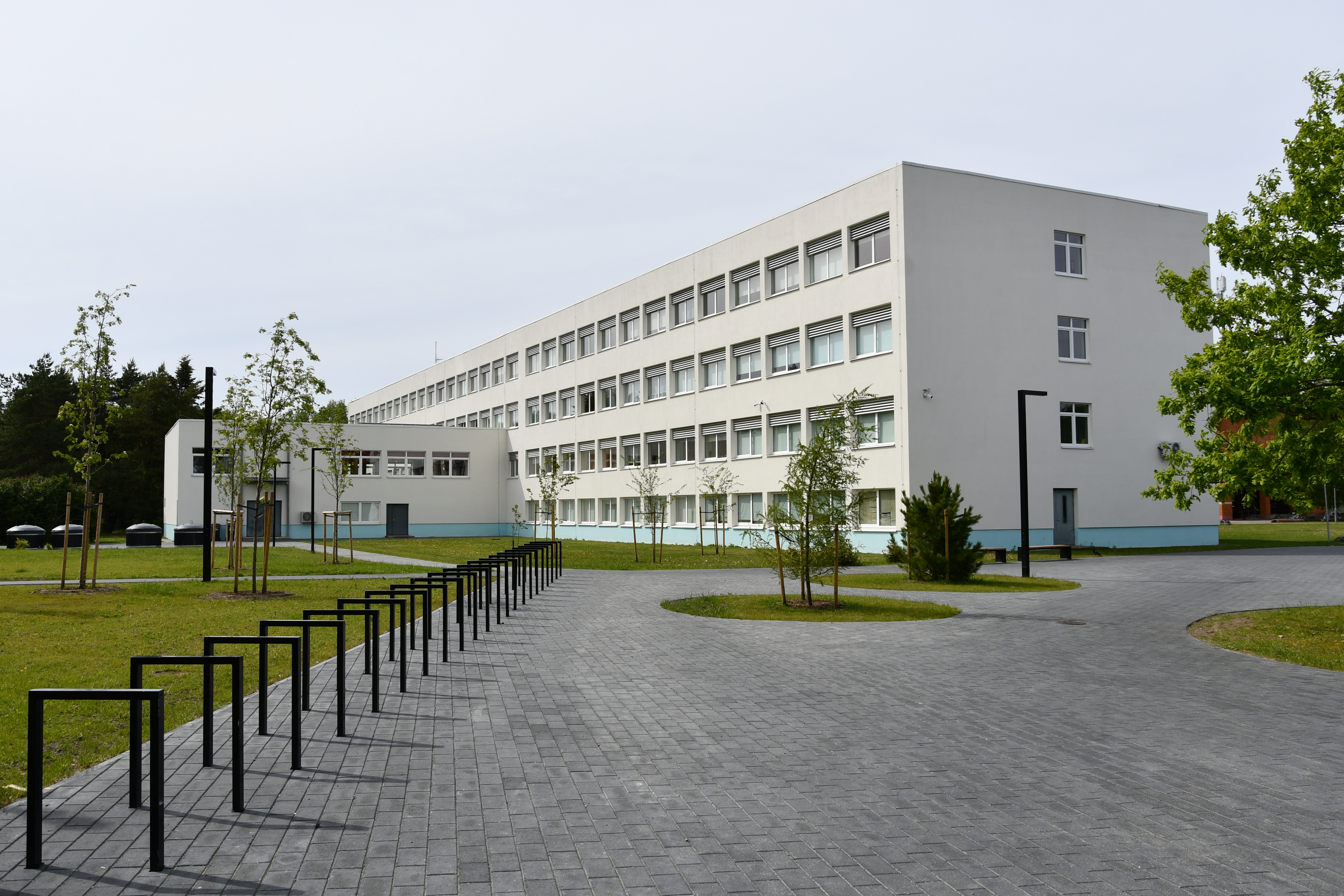
Tabasalu school building

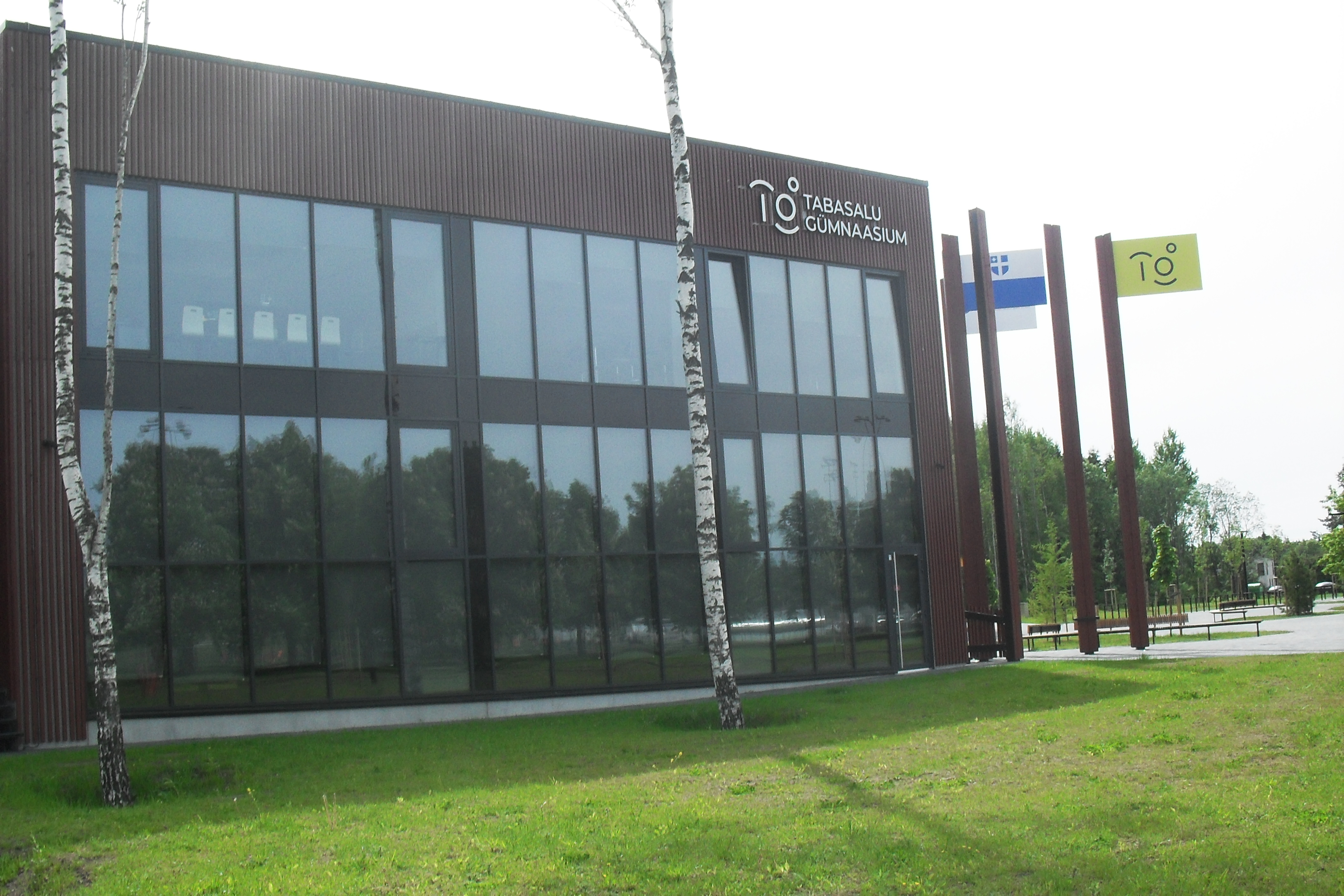
Tabasalu Gymnasium

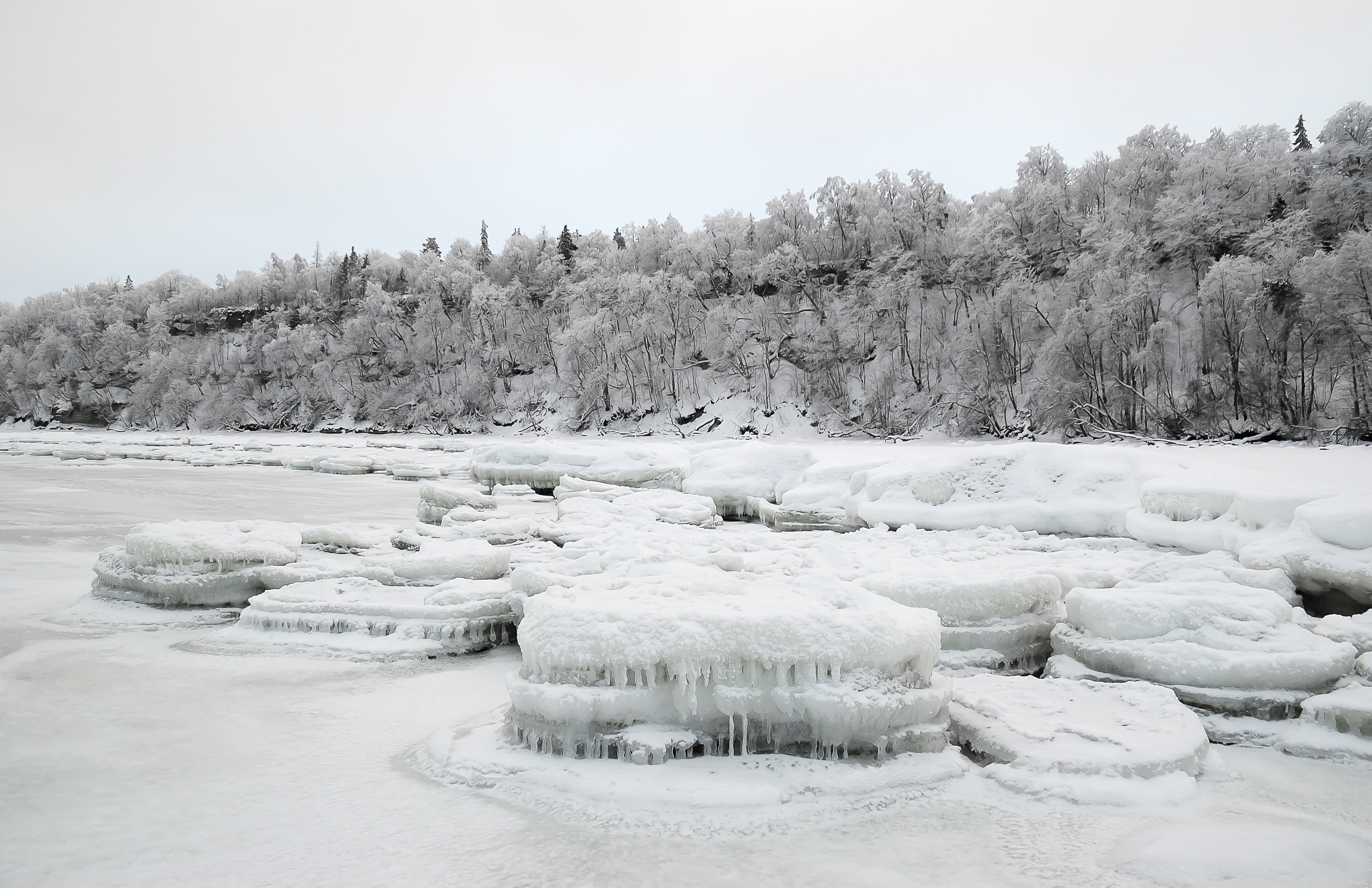
Tabasalu cliff in winter

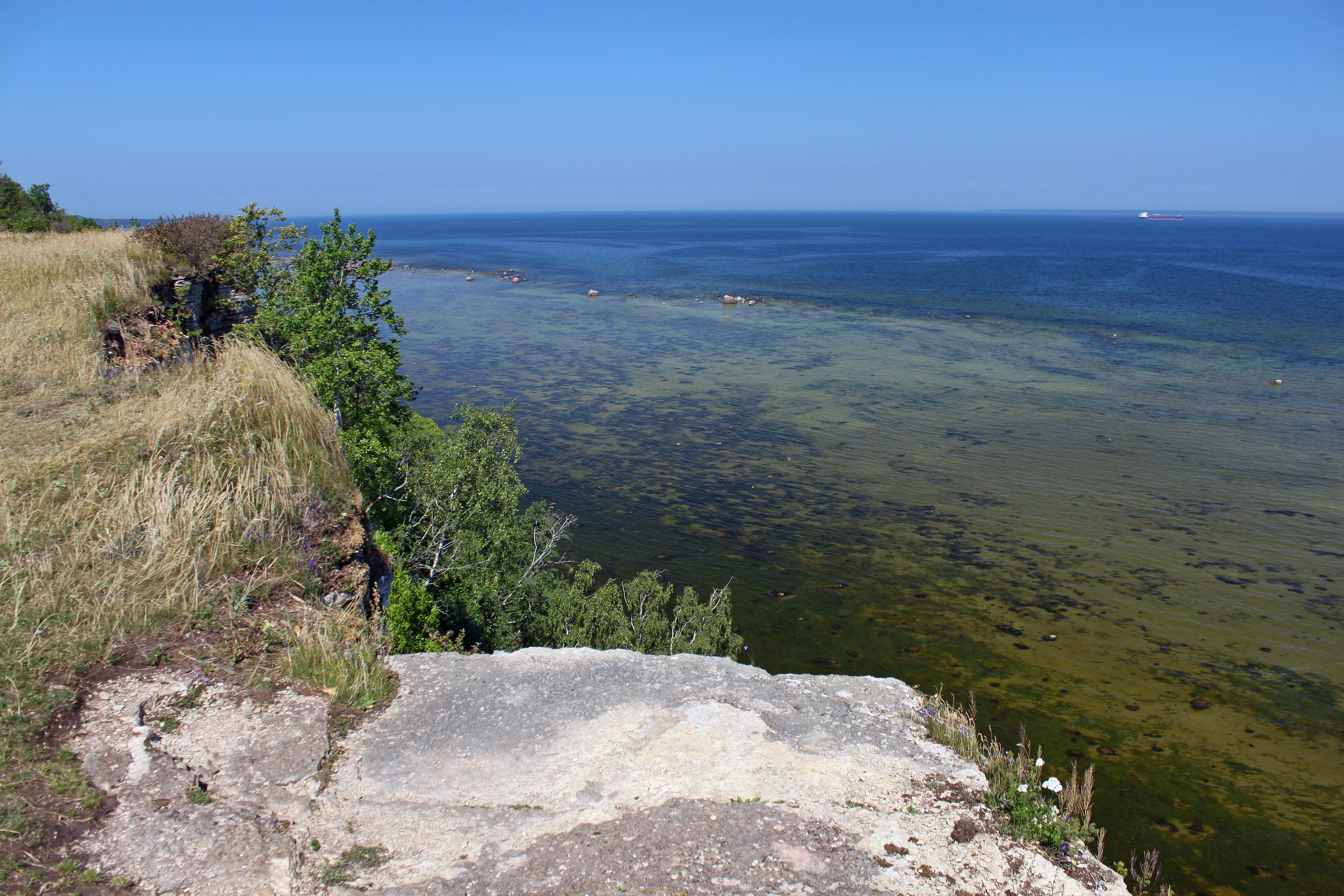
View from Tabasalu cliff

== See also ==
- Tabasalu Palliklubi
- Tabasalu Bog
