= Tabasalu Arena =

Multi-purpose stadium in Tabasalu, Estonia

Coordinates: 59°25′42.86″N 24°32′3.2″E

- Location: Tabasalu, Estonia
- Capacity: 1,630
- Field size: 105 × 68 m
- Surface: Artificial turf

Construction
- Opened: 1 October 2017; 7 years ago
- Construction cost: €1.5 million
- Builder: Lemminkäinen Group

Tenants
- JK Tabasalu (2017–present)

Tabasalu Arena is a multi-purpose stadium in Tabasalu, Harku Parish, Estonia. Opened in 2017, it is the home ground of JK Tabasalu. The stadium has a capacity of 1,630.

== History ==
The construction of the Tabasalu Arena began in May 2017 adjacent to the Tabasalu Sports Complex and on the grounds of the former stadium that was built in 1986. The construction cost over €1.5 million and the stadium was opened on 1 October 2017.
