= Nikita Mihhailov =

Estonian footballer

Personal information
- Full name: Nikita Mihhailov
- Date of birth: 20 June 2002 (age 24)
- Place of birth: Narva, Estonia
- Position: Midfielder

Team information
- Current team: Zemplín Michalovce
- Number: 31

Youth career
- 2010–2019: Narva Trans

Senior career*
Years	Team	Apps	(Gls)
2017–2022	Narva Trans	116	(9)
2023–2026	FC Flora	95	(14)
2026–	Zemplín Michalovce	3	(0)

International career^{‡}
2017	Estonia U16	2	(0)
2018	Estonia U17	6	(0)
2022	Estonia U18	2	(0)
2021–2024	Estonia U21	16	(0)
2024–	Estonia	1	(0)
- * Club domestic league appearances and goals as of 25 May 2026 ‡ National team caps and goals as of 10 June 2024

Nikita Mihhailov (born 20 June 2002) is an Estonian professional footballer who currently plays as a midfielder for Slovak First Football League club Zemplín Michalovce and the Estonia national team.

== Club career ==
He joined FC Flora from fellow Meistriliiga side Narva Trans in 2023.

== International career ==
Mihhailov made his senior international debut for Estonia on 12 January 2024, in a 1–2 defeat to Sweden in a friendly.
