= Estonia national under-21 football team =

Estonia U21
- Nickname: Sinisärgid (Blueshirts)
- Association: Estonian Football Association
- Confederation: UEFA (Europe)
- Head coach: Jani Sarajärvi
- Captain: Tanel Tammik
- Most caps: Marko Meerits; Andrei Veis (30)
- Top scorer: Aleksandr Šapovalov (6)
- FIFA code: EST
First colours	Second colours

First international
- Cyprus 4–2 Estonia (Achna, Cyprus; 9 March 1994)

Biggest win
- Luxembourg 0–6 Estonia (Erpeldange, Luxembourg; 29 March 2011)

Biggest defeat
- Estonia 1–10 Germany (Tallinn, Estonia; 10 September 2024)

UEFA U-21 Championship
- Appearances: 0

The Estonia national under-21 football team is the national under-21 football team of Estonia and is controlled by the Estonian Football Association.

As a European under-21 team, Estonia competes in the UEFA European Under-21 Championship, held every two years. To date Estonia haven't yet qualified for the finals tournament. The team also competes in the biennial Under-21 Baltic Cup, winning the tournament in 2014.

== Coaching staff ==
As of 16 October 2024

Position	Name
Head coach	(Estonia) Sander Post
Assistant coach	(Estonia) Igor Morozov
Goalkeeping coach	(Estonia) Aiko Orgla
Fitness coach	(Estonia) Karel Kübar
Doctor	(Estonia) Timo Rahnel
Physiotherapist	(Estonia) Martin Seeman
Physiotherapist	(Estonia) Kristjan Mardo
Manager	(Estonia) Even Laanemaa

== Players ==
=== Current squad ===
- The following players were called-up for the 2025 UEFA European Under-21 Championship qualification matches.
- Match dates: 11 and 15 October 2024
- Opposition: Israel and Kosovo
- Caps and goals correct as of: 15 October 2024, after the match against Kosovo

No.	Pos.	Player	Date of birth (age)	Caps	Goals	Club
	GK	Kaur Kivila	22 November 2003 (age 22)	16	0	(Estonian Football Association) Kuressaare
	GK	Georg Mattias Lagus	3 March 2003 (age 23)	0	0	(Estonian Football Association) FC Nõmme United
	GK	Ott Nõmm	23 October 2004 (age 22)	0	0	(Estonian Football Association) Vaprus
	DF	Mihhail Kolobov	2 March 2005 (age 21)	3	0	(Estonian Football Association) Flora
	DF	Kristofer Käit	4 April 2005 (age 21)	0	0	(Estonian Football Association) Kalev
	DF	Rasmus Kallas	11 April 2003 (age 23)	4	0	(Estonian Football Association) Tammeka
	DF	Aleksandr Nikolajev	23 June 2003 (age 23)	6	0	(Estonian Football Association) Nõmme Kalju
	DF	Daniil Sõtšugov	15 January 2003 (age 23)	13	0	(Estonian Football Association) Kalev
	DF	Tanel Tammik	14 June 2002 (age 24)	13	1	(Estonian Football Association) Tammeka
	DF	Robert Veering	1 December 2005 (age 20)	2	0	(Estonian Football Association) Flora
	DF	Andreas Vaher	15 April 2004 (age 22)	8	0	(Estonian Football Association) Flora
	MF	Tristan Toomas Teeväli	19 May 2003 (age 23)	13	3	(Estonian Football Association) Kalev
	MF	Oskar Hõim	1 July 2005 (age 21)	0	0	(Estonian Football Association) Paide
	MF	Nikita Mihhailov	20 June 2002 (age 24)	20	1	(Estonian Football Association) Flora
	MF	Patrik Kristal	11 November 2007 (age 18)	3	1	(Estonian Football Association) Paide
	MF	Kaspar Rõõmussaar	18 March 2003 (age 23)	0	0	(Estonian Football Association) Harju JK Laagri
	MF	Nikita Vassiljev	7 October 2003 (age 23)	9	0	(Slovak Football Association) FC ŠTK 1914 Šamorín
	MF	Dimitri Jepihhin	28 October 2005 (age 21)	6	0	(Estonian Football Association) Paide
	FW	Danil Kuraksin	4 April 2003 (age 23)	17	2	(Estonian Football Association) Flora
	FW	Aleksandr Šapovalov	28 February 2003 (age 23)	17	6	(Hellenic Football Federation) Niki Volos
	FW	Daniil Tarassenkov	25 February 2003 (age 23)	8	0	(Estonian Football Association) Nõmme Kalju
	FW	Taaniel Usta	17 February 2003 (age 23)	7	1	(Estonian Football Association) Pärnu JK Vaprus
	FW	Patrick Genro Veelma	15 April 2002 (age 24)	11	0	(Estonian Football Association) Tammeka
	FW	Sten Jakob Viidas	24 February 2003 (age 23)	6	1	(Football Association of Finland) KPV
	FW	Karel Mustmaa	8 August 2005 (age 21)	6	0	(Portuguese Football Federation) SL Benfica
	FW	Tony Varjund	21 June 2007 (age 19)	2	1	(Estonian Football Association) Flora

=== Recent call-ups ===
The following players have also been called up to the squad within the last twelve months.

Pos.	Player	Date of birth (age)	Caps	Goals	Club	Latest call-up

- ^{INJ} Withdrew due to an injury.
- ^{PRE} Preliminary squad.
- ^{RET} Retired from the national team.

== Competitive record ==
=== UEFA European Under-21 Championship ===
- 1978 to 1992 - see Soviet Union

UEFA European Under-21 Championship record									Qualification record					
Year	Round	Position	Pld	W	D	L	GF	GA	Pld	W	D	L	GF	GA
(France) 1994	did not enter													
(Spain) 1996	did not qualify								10	0	0	10	5	37
(Romania) 1998	did not qualify								10	1	1	8	4	25
(Slovakia) 2000	did not qualify								10	0	0	10	4	35
(Switzerland) 2002	did not qualify								8	0	0	8	2	28
(Germany) 2004	did not qualify								6	0	2	4	4	10
(Portugal) 2006	did not qualify								10	0	2	8	4	25
(Netherlands) 2007	did not qualify								2	0	0	2	1	7
(Sweden) 2009	did not qualify								8	1	0	7	1	19
(Denmark) 2011	did not qualify								10	3	3	4	9	16
(Israel) 2013	did not qualify								8	0	1	7	2	19
(Czech Republic) 2015	did not qualify								10	2	3	5	9	23
(Poland) 2017	did not qualify								10	1	1	8	3	26
(Italy) (San Marino) 2019	did not qualify								10	0	2	8	11	24
(Hungary) (Slovenia) 2021	did not qualify								10	1	2	7	3	34
(Romania) (Georgia (country)) 2023	did not qualify								10	0	0	10	0	32
(Slovakia) 2025	did not qualify								10	2	1	7	7	31
(Albania) (Serbia) 2027	did not qualify								5	0	2	3	5	13
Total		0/26	0	0	0	0	0	0	147	11	20	116	74	404

Draws include knockout matches decided on penalty kicks.

== Honours and achievements ==
=== Regional ===
- Under-21 Baltic Cup
  - Champions (1): 2014

== See also ==
- Estonia national football team
- Estonia national under-23 football team
- Estonia national under-19 football team
- Estonia national under-17 football team
- Estonia national youth football team
