= Sten Jakob Viidas =

Estonian footballer (born 2003)

Personal information
- Date of birth: 24 February 2003 (age 23)
- Place of birth: Tallinn, Estonia
- Height: 1.75 m (5 ft 9 in)
- Position: Winger

Team information
- Current team: Pärnu Vaprus
- Number: 10

Youth career
- –2019: Tabasalu
- 2021–2022: Vitória de Guimarães

Senior career*
Years	Team	Apps	(Gls)
2019–2021	Tabasalu	54	(24)
2022–2025	Paide	34	(1)
2022–2025	Paide II	21	(3)
2024	→ KPV (loan)	25	(13)
2025	→ Narva Trans (loan)	29	(4)
2026–	Pärnu Vaprus	33	(7)

International career^{‡}
2018	Estonia U16	2	(0)
2019	Estonia U17	11	(1)
2021	Estonia U19	5	(0)
2022–	Estonia U21	6	(1)
- * Club domestic league appearances and goals as of 17 November 2026 ‡ National team caps and goals as of 9 March 2024

Sten Jakob Viidas (born 24 February 2003) is an Estonian professional footballer who plays as a winger for Meistriliiga club Pärnu Vaprus.

== Honours ==
Paide Linnameeskond

- Estonian Supercup: 2023

KPV

- Ykkönen runner-up: 2024
