= Tanel Tammik =

Estonian footballer (born 2002)

Personal information
- Full name: Tanel Tammik
- Date of birth: 14 June 2002 (age 24)
- Place of birth: Tartu, Estonia
- Height: 6 ft 1 in (1.85 m)
- Position: Centre-back

Team information
- Current team: FCI Levadia
- Number: 4

Youth career
- 2010–2020: Tammeka

Senior career*
Years	Team	Apps	(Gls)
2018–2022	Tammeka U21	55	(3)
2019	Tammeka III	3	(0)
2020–2024	Tammeka	118	(7)
2024–	FCI Levadia	54	(3)
2025–	FCI Levadia U21	3	(0)

International career^{‡}
2019	Estonia U17	2	(0)
2022–2024	Estonia U21	13	(1)
2026–	Estonia	2	(1)
- * Club domestic league appearances and goals as of 17 November 2026 ‡ National team caps and goals as of 31 March 2026

Tanel Tammik (born 14 June 2002) is an Estonian professional footballer who plays as a centre-back for Meistriliiga club FCI Levadia and the Estonia national team.

== Club career ==
=== Tammeka ===
Tammik came through the youth system at Tammeka before graduating to the first team in 2020. He made his Meistriliiga debut on 31 July in a 1–1 away draw against Nõmme Kalju.

=== FCI Levadia ===
Tammik signed for FCI Levadia on 26 November 2024. On 22 February, he made his competitive debut for the club against Nõmme Kalju in the 2025 Estonian Supercup, which FCI Levadia won 3–2.

== International career ==
Tammik has competed for the Estonia under-17s and under-21s.

He received his first call-up for the Estonia senior team in December 2022 ahead of their friendly matches against Iceland and Finland, but did not play in either match. On 20 March 2026, Tammik was called up to the Estonia squad for the 2026 FIFA Series matches in Rwanda. He made his international debut against Kenya on 27 March, scoring a header in the 21st minute. Estonia won the match 5–4 on penalties after a 1–1 draw in normal time.

== Career statistics ==
=== International ===
As of match played 30 March 2026

Appearances and goals by national team and year
National team	Year	Apps	Goals
Estonia	2026	2	1
Total		2	1

Scores and results list Estonia's goal tally first, score column indicates score after each Tammik goal.

List of international goals scored by Tanel Tammik
No.	Date	Venue	Cap	Opponent	Score	Result	Competition
1	27 March 2026	Amahoro Stadium, Kigali, Rwanda	1	Kenya	1–0	1–1 (5–4 p)	2026 FIFA Series

== Honours ==
FCI Levadia

- Estonian Supercup: 2025
