= Robert Veering =

Estonian footballer (born 2005)

Personal information
- Full name: Robert Veering
- Date of birth: 1 December 2005 (age 20)
- Place of birth: Tallinn, Estonia
- Height: 1.87 m (6 ft 2 in)
- Position: Defender

Team information
- Current team: FC Flora
- Number: 6

Youth career
- 2014–2023: FC Flora

Senior career*
Years	Team	Apps	(Gls)
2021–	FC Flora U21	60	(1)
2023–	FC Flora	73	(2)

International career^{‡}
2022	Estonia U18	3	(0)
2022	Estonia U19	6	(0)
2022–	Estonia U21	10	(0)
2024–	Estonia	1	(0)
- * Club domestic league appearances and goals as of 17 November 2026 ‡ National team caps and goals as of 1 July 2026

Robert Veering (born 1 December 2005) is an Estonian professional footballer who currently plays as a defender for Meistriliiga club FC Flora and the Estonia national team.

== Club career ==
A central defender, Veering has spent his entire career including youth years at FC Flora joining the club at the age of nine years-old.

At the end of the summer of 2021, he first tasted adult football when he made his debut for the Flora U19 team in the Estonian Championship II League. Soon after, he progressed to feature for the FC Flora U21 team in the Esiliiga and became a regular starter in 2022.

Veering made his Estonian Premium Liiga debut in April 2023, playing 27 minutes as a substitute in a 4–0 win over Pärnu JK Vaprus at the age of 17 years-old. He scored his first goal for the club on 1 November 2023, in a 3–1 win against JK Narva Trans. In both the 2023–24 season and the 2024–25 season he featured for the club in the UEFA Conference League.

== International career ==
On 21 September 2022, he made his debut for the Estonian under-18 national football team in a 3–0 defeat to France U18.

He made his debut for the Estonia national under-21 football team on 17 November 2023 against Germany U21 in a UEFA European Under-21 Championship qualifying match in Paderborn, in which Germany won 4–1.

Veering made his senior international debut for Estonia on 12 January 2024, in a 1–2 defeat to Sweden in a friendly in Paphos.

== Personal life ==
He attended Kadriorg German Gymnasium in Tallinn. His brother Moorits Veering is also a professional footballer who plays as a central defender for Estonian side FC Kuressaare.
