= Oskar Hõim =

Estonian footballer (born 2005)

Personal information
- Full name: Oskar Hõim
- Date of birth: 1 July 2005 (age 21)
- Place of birth: Tallinn, Estonia
- Height: 1.85 m (6 ft 1 in)
- Position: Midfielder

Team information
- Current team: Paide Linnameeskond
- Number: 28

Youth career
- –2014: Nõmme Kalju
- 2014: AIK
- 2014–2019: IF Brommapojkarna
- 2019–2021: JK Tabasalu

Senior career*
Years	Team	Apps	(Gls)
2021–2022	JK Tabasalu	51	(3)
2023–	Paide Linnameeskond	135	(3)
2023–	Paide Linnameeskond U21	10	(0)

International career^{‡}
2021	Estonia U17	10	(0)
2022	Estonia U18	3	(0)
2022	Estonia U19	13	(1)
2024–	Estonia	1	(0)
- * Club domestic league appearances and goals as of 17 November 2026 ‡ National team caps and goals as of 18 March 2024

Oskar Hõim (born 1 July 2005) is an Estonian professional footballer who currently plays as a midfielder for Meistriliiga club Paide Linnameeskond and the Estonia national team.

== Club career ==
He joined Paide Linnameeskond from Esiliiga B side JK Tabasalu in February 2023.

== International career ==
Hõim made his senior international debut for Estonia on 12 January 2024, in a 1–2 defeat to Sweden in a friendly.
