= Danil Kuraksin =

Estonian footballer (born 2003)

Personal information
- Full name: Danil Kuraksin
- Date of birth: 4 April 2003 (age 23)
- Place of birth: Tallinn, Estonia
- Height: 1.82 m (5 ft 11 1/2 in)
- Position: Winger

Team information
- Current team: Flora
- Number: 7

Youth career
- 2007–2011: FC Puuma
- 2012–2017: Tallinna Kalev
- 2018–2020: Flora

Senior career*
Years	Team	Apps	(Gls)
2018–2019	Flora U19	13	(4)
2018–2023	Flora U21	79	(15)
2020–	Flora	175	(38)

International career^{‡}
2018	Estonia U16	4	(2)
2019	Estonia U17	13	(3)
2021	Estonia U19	7	(0)
2022	Estonia U21	15	(2)
2023–	Estonia	4	(1)
- * Club domestic league appearances and goals as of 17 November 2026 ‡ National team caps and goals as of 2 December 2025

Danil Kuraksin (born 4 April 2003) is an Estonian professional footballer who plays as a winger for Meistriliiga club Flora and the Estonia national team.

== International career ==
Kuraksin made his senior international debut for Estonia on 12 January 2023, in a 1–0 victory over Finland in a friendly.

== Honours ==
=== Club ===
Flora

- Meistriliiga: 2022
