= JK Tabasalu =

Estonian football club

- Full name: Jalgpalliklubi Tabasalu
- Founded: 23 November 2012; 13 years ago
- Ground: Tabasalu Arena, Tabasalu
- Capacity: 1,630
- Chairman: Viktor Kiolein
- Manager: Indrek Zelinski
- League: Esiliiga B
- 2026: Esiliiga B, 8th of 10
- Website: https://tabasalujk.ee
Home colours	Away colours

Jalgpalliklubi Tabasalu, commonly known as Tabasalu, is an Estonian football club based in Tabasalu, Harku Parish. The club competes in Esiliiga, the second tier of Estonian football. Tabasalu's home ground is Tabasalu Arena.

== History ==
The football club was founded on 23 November 2012 and its first seasons in the Estonian league system were quite successful: they finished second in their debut seasons in IV liiga and III liiga. In 2018, Tabasalu hired former FCI Levadia coach Marko Kristal as manager and quickly became II liiga's title contenders. During the 2018 season, while playing in the fourth division, Tabasalu had an average attendance of 321 people, which was Estonia's fourth largest home average at the time. The year ended with them finishing third, but due to Paide Linnameeskond III not wanting to get promoted, they were given the opportunity to take part in promotion play-offs. They got through to the final thanks to FCI Tallinn using an unavailable player. In the final round they played against Lasnamäe Ajax, who they managed to beat 3–0 and 4–1 and were therefore promoted to the top three leagues.

In their debut season in Esiliiga B, they were last-placed after 17 rounds, but managed to start gaining points and rose to seventh by the end of the year with nine points ahead of relegation places. Throughout the year, Tabasalu's youth players had trials in Bologna, Chievo Verona and Padova. After the season, Marko Kristal joined Nõmme Kalju. The club reached the Estonian Cup quarter-finals in the following year and finished fourth in the 2020 Esiliiga B season. They were again given the option to play in the promotion play-offs, but this time lost 2–8 on aggregate to Pärnu JK. Tabasalu finished the 2022 Esiliiga B season in 2nd place, narrowly losing the title in the last second of the final matchday against FC Tallinn.

On 19 October 2022, whilst competing in the Estonian third tier, Tabasalu notably knocked out top flight club Nõmme Kalju FC from the Estonian Cup by winning 1–0. The club reached the 2022–23 Estonian Cup semi-finals, where they lost to the eventual winners Narva Trans 0–1 at home.

== Players ==
=== Current squad ===
As of 28 August 2024

Note: Flags indicate national team as defined under FIFA eligibility rules; some limited exceptions apply. Players may hold more than one non-FIFA nationality.

No.	Pos.	Nation	Player
1	GK	EST	Rihard Kristjan Kristel
2	DF	EST	Valeri Makarov
3	DF	EST	Juss Ilisson
4	DF	EST	Joel Kokla
6	MF	EST	Tomi Linde
7	FW	EST	Kevin Pormeister
10	FW	EST	Raivo Saar
11	MF	EST	Thomas Matvejev
12	DF	EST	Sigvard Suppi
13	DF	EST	Märten Subka
14	FW	EST	Markus Vaherna
16	DF	EST	Kristjan Pelt
21	MF	EST	Mark Toompuu

No.	Pos.	Nation	Player
22	DF	EST	Robin Korran
25	DF	EST	Henri Raaper
26	DF	EST	Hans Oliver Vuks
27	GK	EST	Kaupo Koort
30	DF	EST	Robin Rumberg
32	FW	EST	Art Anepaio
42	GK	EST	Kaarel Rumberg
44	DF	EST	Frank Annion
47	FW	EST	Karl-Erik Ennuste
55	FW	EST	Markus Poder
66	MF	EST	Sander Salei
80	MF	EST	Jaagup Taal
90	MF	EST	Ken-Tristan Joelaid

=== Out on loan ===
Note: Flags indicate national team as defined under FIFA eligibility rules; some limited exceptions apply. Players may hold more than one non-FIFA nationality.

No.	Pos.	Nation	Player

== Personnel ==
=== Current technical staff ===
Position	Name
Head coach	(Brazil) Alan Arruda
Goalkeeping coach	(Brazil) Bernardo Coelho
Physiotherapist	(Estonia) Kätlin Laurson

=== Managerial history ===
Dates	Name
2018–2019	(Estonia) Marko Kristal
2020–2023	(Estonia) Risto Sarapik
2024–	(Brazil) Alan Arruda

== League and Cup history ==
Season	Division	Pos	Pld	W	D	L	GF	GA	GD	Pts	Top Goalscorer	Estonian Cup	Notes
2013	IV liiga N	2	20	15	3	2	78	27	+51	48	(Estonia) Kersten Lõppe (19)		as Tallinna JK Charma Mööbel
2014	III liiga N	2	22	15	3	4	64	29	+35	48	(Estonia) Tanel Tammemägi (13)		as Tallinna JK Charma
2015	II liiga N/E	6	26	10	7	9	57	67	−10	37	(Estonia) Martin Tšegodajev (7)	Third round	as Tabasalu JK Charma
2016	II liiga N/E	5	26	12	7	7	56	48	+8	43	(Estonia) Edwin Stüf (9)	First round	as Tabasalu JK Charma
2017	II liiga S/W	3	26	15	3	8	77	52	+25	48	(Estonia) Andrus Mitt (17)	–	as JK Tabasalu
2018	II liiga S/W	3	26	17	3	6	68	40	+28	54	(Estonia) Edwin Stüf (19)	–	as JK Tabasalu
2019	Esiliiga B	7	36	13	4	19	77	79	–2	43	(Estonia) Kersten Lõppe (13)	Quarter-finals	as JK Tabasalu
2020	Esiliiga B	4	30	16	3	11	58	46	+12	51	(Estonia) Sten Jakob Viidas (14)	Fourth round	as JK Tabasalu
2021	Esiliiga B	6	32	12	5	15	60	64	–4	41	(Estonia) Tristan Pajo (16)	–	as JK Tabasalu
2022	Esiliiga B	2	36	25	4	7	120	50	+70	79	(Estonia) Tristan Pajo (30)	Quarter-finals	as JK Tabasalu
2023	Esiliiga	5	36	18	1	17	81	70	+11	55	(Estonia) Peeter Klein (16)	Semi-finals	as JK Tabasalu
