= List of Estonian expatriate footballers =

This is a list of Estonian expatriate footballers of all time. Only players that have represented Estonian senior men's national team are included.

== Armenia ==
- Ilja Antonov
- Nikita Baranov

== Austria ==
- Ilja Antonov
- Henrik Ojamaa
- Arnold Pihlak

== Azerbaijan ==
- Artur Kotenko
- Dmitri Kruglov
- Taavi Rähn
- Tihhon Šišov
- Erik Sorga
- Andrei Stepanov
- Vladimir Voskoboinikov
- Sergei Zenjov

== Belarus ==
- Aleksandr Dmitrijev
- Artur Kotenko
- Sergei Mošnikov
- Artur Pikk
- Andrei Sidorenkov
- Andrei Stepanov
- Mark Švets

== Belgium ==
- Sergei Bragin
- Artjom Dmitrijev
- Enar Jääger
- Tarmo Neemelo
- Kevor Palumets
- Maksim Paskotši
- Rauno Sappinen
- Ramol Sillamaa
- Vladimir Voskoboinikov

== Bosnia and Herzegovina ==
- Frank Liivak

== Bulgaria ==
- Artjom Artjunin
- Nikita Baranov
- Trevor Elhi
- Matvei Igonen
- Joel Lindpere
- Erik Sorga
- Joonas Tamm
- Edgar Tur
- Bogdan Vaštšuk

== China ==
- Andres Oper
- Raio Piiroja
- Taavi Rähn
- Vladimir Voskoboinikov

== Croatia ==
- Henrik Ojamaa

== Cyprus ==
- Nikita Baranov
- Tristan Koskor
- Artur Kotenko
- Andres Oper
- Ats Purje
- Andrei Stepanov
- Martin Vunk

== Czech Republic ==
- Kaarel Kiidron
- Joel Lindpere
- Siim Luts
- Sander Puri
- Mikk Reintam
- Vlasiy Sinyavskiy
- Igor Subbotin
- Siim Tenno

== Denmark ==
- Mihkel Ainsalu
- Hannes Anier
- Henri Järvelaid
- Risto Kallaste
- Karl Mööl
- Andres Oper
- Sander Post
- Urmas Rooba
- Kaimar Saag
- Andrei Sidorenkov
- Indrek Zelinski

== England ==
- Mihkel Aksalu
- Karl Jakob Hein
- Mattias Käit
- Tarmo Kink
- Ragnar Klavan
- Henrik Ojamaa
- Maksim Paskotši
- Mart Poom
- Sander Puri
- Andrei Stepanov
- Andreas Vaikla
- Bogdan Vaštšuk
- Sergei Zenjov

== Faroe Islands ==
- Kaimar Saag

== Finland ==
- Mihkel Aksalu
- Henri Anier
- Argo Arbeiter
- Andrei Borissov
- Sergei Bragin
- Artjom Dmitrijev
- Trevor Elhi
- Maksim Gussev
- Urmas Hepner
- Markus Jürgenson
- Urmas Kaljend
- Marek Kaljumäe
- Toomas Kallaste
- Gert Kams
- Tarmo Kink
- Urmas Kirs
- Dzintar Klavan
- Oliver Konsa
- Artur Kotenko
- Marko Kristal
- Toomas Krõm
- Liivo Leetma
- Brent Lepistu
- Sergei Lepmets
- Meelis Lindmaa
- Tarmo Linnumäe
- Marco Lukka
- Pavel Marin
- Marko Meerits
- Sergei Mošnikov
- Tarmo Neemelo
- Raivo Nõmmik
- Jevgeni Novikov
- Henrik Ojamaa
- Hindrek Ojamaa
- Kevor Palumets
- Artur Pikk
- Mart Poom
- Albert Prosa
- Sander Puri
- Ats Purje
- Taavi Rähn
- Lembit Rajala
- Sergei Ratnikov
- Martin Reim
- Mikk Reintam
- Urmas Rooba
- Aavo Sarap
- Vitali Teleš
- Sergei Terehhov
- Andreas Vaher
- Vahur Vahtramäe
- Andreas Vaikla
- Rain Vessenberg
- Seppo Vilderson
- Vjatšeslav Zahovaiko
- Sergei Zamorski
- Indrek Zelinski

== Georgia ==
- Vladimir Voskoboinikov

== Germany ==
- Hannes Anier
- Henri Anier
- Karl Hein
- Dzintar Klavan
- Ragnar Klavan
- Patrik Kristal
- Marek Lemsalu
- Karol Mets
- Henrik Ojamaa
- Ingemar Teever
- Siim Tenno
- Andreas Vaher

== Greece ==
- Karel Mustmaa
- Sander Puri
- Kristen Viikmäe

== Hong Kong ==
- Henri Anier

== Hungary ==
- Jarmo Ahjupera
- Oliver Jürgens
- Tarmo Kink
- Märten Kuusk
- Igor Morozov
- Artur Pikk
- Sander Puri
- Vjatšeslav Zahovaiko

== Ireland ==
- Vladislav Kreida
- Frank Liivak
- Michael Lilander
- Martin Miller
- Markus Poom
- Sander Puri
- Sten Reinkort
- Bogdan Vaštšuk

== Israel ==
- Sergei Hohlov-Simson
- Rauno Sappinen

== Italy ==
- Henri Anier
- Enar Jääger
- Oliver Jürgens
- Tarmo Kink
- Ragnar Klavan
- Frank Liivak
- Kevor Palumets
- Sergei Pareiko
- Markus Soomets
- Joonas Tamm
- Georgi Tunjov
- Andreas Vaher
- Martin Vetkal

== Kazakhstan ==
- Artjom Dmitrijev
- Rimo Hunt
- Sergei Mošnikov
- Jevgeni Novikov
- Mark Švets
- Sergei Zenjov

== Kuwait ==
- Bogdan Vaštšuk

== Latvia ==
- Dmitri Kulikov
- Jevgeni Novikov
- Artur Pikk
- Maksim Smirnov
- Bogdan Vaštšuk

== Lithuania ==
- Artjom Dmitrijev
- Vitali Gussev
- Sergei Mošnikov
- Taavi Rähn

== Malta ==
- Albert Prosa

== Netherlands ==
- Mihkel Ainsalu
- Henri Anier
- Marek Kaljumäe
- Ragnar Klavan
- Frank Liivak
- Marko Meerits
- Karol Mets
- Sergei Mošnikov
- Henrik Ojamaa
- Andres Oper
- Raio Piiroja
- Sander Post
- Rauno Sappinen
- Rocco Robert Shein
- Erik Sorga

== Norway ==
- Henri Anier
- Aivar Anniste
- Nikita Baranov
- Alo Bärengrub
- Aleksandr Dmitrijev
- Alo Dupikov
- Sergei Hohlov-Simson
- Matvei Igonen
- Enar Jääger
- Ragnar Klavan
- Artur Kotenko
- Marek Lemsalu
- Brent Lepistu
- Joel Lindpere
- Pavel Londak
- Karol Mets
- Henrik Ojamaa
- Karl Palatu
- Raio Piiroja
- Sander Post
- Eino Puri
- Siim Roops
- Kaimar Saag
- Andrei Sidorenkov
- Joonas Tamm
- Taijo Teniste
- Sergei Terehhov
- Toomas Tohver
- Andreas Vaikla
- Madis Vihmann
- Kristen Viikmäe

== Poland ==
- Artjom Artjunin
- Matvei Igonen
- Ken Kallaste
- Robert Kirss
- Märten Kuusk
- Igor Morozov
- Sergei Mošnikov
- Karl-Romet Nõmm
- Henrik Ojamaa
- Sergei Pareiko
- Artur Pikk
- Sander Puri
- Rauno Sappinen
- Igor Subbotin
- Joonas Tamm
- Konstantin Vassiljev
- Bogdan Vaštšuk
- Sergei Zenjov

== Portugal ==
- Vjatšeslav Zahovaiko

== Romania ==
- Ilja Antonov
- Artjom Artjunin
- Vitali Gussev
- Mattias Käit
- Brent Lepistu
- Sergei Lepmets
- Eino Puri
- Joonas Tamm

== Russia ==
- Aleksandr Dmitrijev
- Enar Jääger
- Tarmo Kink
- Dmitri Kruglov
- Jevgeni Novikov
- Andres Oper
- Sergei Pareiko
- Taavi Rähn
- Andrei Stepanov
- Mark Švets
- Sergei Terehhov
- Konstantin Vassiljev
- Bogdan Vaštšuk
- Vladimir Voskoboinikov
- Sergei Zenjov

== Saudi Arabia ==
- Karol Mets

== Scotland ==
- Henri Anier
- Mattias Käit
- Tarmo Kink
- Henrik Ojamaa
- Sander Puri
- Mikk Reintam
- Madis Vihmann

== Serbia ==
- Mark Oliver Roosnupp
- Bogdan Vaštšuk

== Slovakia ==
- Dimitri Jepihhin
- Oliver Jürgens
- Nikita Mihhailov
- Kevor Palumets
- Artur Pikk
- Markus Poom
- Nikita Vassiljev

== Slovenia ==
- Ilja Antonov
- Mattias Käit
- Rauno Sappinen
- Konstantin Vassiljev

== South Korea ==
- Henri Anier

== Spain ==
- Karl Hein
- Joel Indermitte
- Oliver Jürgens
- Frank Liivak
- Ioan Yakovlev

== Sweden ==
- Teet Allas
- Henri Anier
- Aivar Anniste
- Vitali Gussev
- Oskar Hõim
- Matvei Igonen
- Risto Kallaste
- Toomas Kallaste
- Vladislav Kreida
- Marko Kristal
- Meelis Lindmaa
- Tarmo Linnumäe
- Siim Luts
- Karol Mets
- Tarmo Neemelo
- Kaimar Saag
- Erik Sorga
- Joonas Tamm
- Ingemar Teever
- Toomas Tohver
- Andreas Vaikla
- Kristen Viikmäe
- Vladimir Voskoboinikov
- Martin Vunk
- Indrek Zelinski

== Switzerland ==
- Mark Anders Lepik
- Karol Mets
- Maksim Paskotši
- Mart Poom
- Alex Matthias Tamm

== Thailand ==
- Henri Anier

== Turkey ==
- Pavel Londak
- Sten Reinkort

== Ukraine ==
- Mihkel Ainsalu
- Tarmo Kink
- Jevgeni Novikov
- Taavi Rähn
- Joonas Tamm
- Sergei Zenjov

== USA ==
- Joel Lindpere
- Erik Sorga

== Uzbekistan ==
- Artjom Dmitrijev

== Vietnam ==
- Erik Sorga
