= 2026 Baltic Cup squads =

The following is a list of squads for each nation competing in the 2026 Baltic Cup, held from 6 to 9 June in the cities of Kaunas, Pärnu, Riga, Tallinn. including 3 goalkeepers.

Age, caps and goals as of one day previous to the start of the tournament, 5 June 2026.

== Estonia ==
Head coach: Jürgen Henn

No.	Pos.	Player	Date of birth (age)	Caps	Goals	Club
1	GK	Karl Jakob Hein (captain)	13 April 2002 (age 24)	47	0	(German Football Association) Werder Bremen
12	GK	Henri Perk	14 October 1999 (age 26)	0	0	(Estonian Football Association) Nõmme Kalju
22	GK	Kaur Kivila	22 November 2003 (age 22)	1	0	(Estonian Football Association) Flora
2	DF	Märten Kuusk	5 April 1996 (age 30)	44	0	(Polish Football Association) Polonia Warsaw
3	DF	Mihhail Kolobov	2 March 2005 (age 21)	2	0	(Estonian Football Association) Flora
6	DF	Rasmus Peetson	3 May 1995 (age 31)	26	2	(Estonian Football Association) FCI Levadia
9	DF	Ioan Yakovlev	19 January 1998 (age 28)	14	1	(Hellenic Football Federation) Panionios
13	DF	Kristofer Käit	4 April 2005 (age 21)	1	0	(Portuguese Football Federation) Portimonense
18	DF	Tanel Tammik	14 June 2002 (age 24)	2	1	(Estonian Football Association) FCI Levadia
19	DF	Kristo Hussar	28 June 2002 (age 24)	8	0	(Slovak Football Association) Trenčín
23	DF	Vlasiy Sinyavskiy	27 November 1996 (age 29)	50	1	(Football Association of the Czech Republic) Baník Ostrava
24	DF	Frank Liivak	7 July 1996 (age 30)	27	3	(Estonian Football Association) FCI Levadia
26	DF	Erko Jonne Tõugjas	5 July 2003 (age 23)	9	0	(Swedish Football Association) Halmstad
4	MF	Mattias Käit	29 June 1998 (age 28)	66	11	(Swiss Football Association) Thun
5	MF	Rocco Robert Shein	14 July 2003 (age 23)	25	1	(The Football Association) Portsmouth
7	MF	Robi Saarma	20 May 2001 (age 25)	16	1	(Football Association of the Czech Republic) Pardubice
8	MF	Markus Soomets	2 March 2000 (age 26)	24	0	(Norwegian Football Federation) Start
10	MF	Kevor Palumets	21 November 2002 (age 23)	21	1	(Slovak Football Association) Košice
14	MF	Patrik Kristal	12 November 2007 (age 18)	14	0	(German Football Association) 1. FC Köln
17	MF	Vladislav Kreida	25 September 1999 (age 26)	25	0	(Estonian Football Association) Flora
20	MF	Markus Poom	27 February 1999 (age 27)	35	0	(Slovak Football Association) Trenčín
21	MF	Martin Miller	25 September 1997 (age 28)	40	2	(Estonian Football Association) Paide Linnameeskond
11	FW	Karel Mustmaa	8 August 2005 (age 21)	5	1	(Hellenic Football Federation) PAOK
16	FW	Tony Varjund	21 June 2007 (age 19)	2	1	(Estonian Football Association) Flora
25	FW	Mattias Männilaan	8 September 2001 (age 24)	3	0	(Estonian Football Association) Nõmme Kalju

== Faroe Islands ==
Head coach: Eyðun Klakstein

No.	Pos.	Player	Date of birth (age)	Caps	Goals	Club
1	GK	Ari Petersen	7 December 2002 (age 23)	0	0	(Football Association of Iceland) ÍBV
12	GK	Silas Eyðsteinsson	13 February 1998 (age 28)	0	0	(Faroe Islands Football Association) B36 Tórshavn
23	GK	Bárður á Reynatrøð	8 January 2000 (age 26)	16	0	(Faroe Islands Football Association) Víkingur Gøta
2	DF	Jóannes Danielsen	10 September 1997 (age 28)	26	0	(Faroe Islands Football Association) KÍ
3	DF	Viljormur Davidsen (captain)	19 July 1991 (age 35)	94	6	(Faroe Islands Football Association) HB
4	DF	Samuel Chukwudi	25 June 2003 (age 23)	9	0	(Austrian Football Association) SV Ried
5	DF	Arnbjørn Svensson	1 August 1999 (age 27)	4	1	(Faroe Islands Football Association) Víkingur Gøta
13	DF	Martin Agnarsson	7 December 2003 (age 22)	11	2	(Swedish Football Association) Mjällby AIF
14	DF	Gullbrandur Øregaard	18 July 2002 (age 24)	3	0	(Norwegian Football Federation) Sandnes Ulf
15	DF	Ari Olsen	9 September 1998 (age 27)	0	0	(Danish Football Association) Vendsyssel
16	DF	Gunnar Vatnhamar	29 March 1995 (age 31)	58	3	(Football Association of Iceland) Víkingur Reykjavík
19	DF	Jann Benjaminsen	3 April 1997 (age 29)	14	1	(Faroe Islands Football Association) NSÍ
20	DF	Hanus Sørensen	19 February 2001 (age 25)	28	5	(Football Association of Slovenia) NK Aluminij
6	MF	Noah Mneney	6 December 2002 (age 23)	12	0	(Faroe Islands Football Association) HB
8	MF	Brandur Hendriksson	19 December 1995 (age 30)	72	6	(Faroe Islands Football Association) NSÍ
21	MF	Géza Dávid Turi	6 October 2001 (age 24)	9	1	(The Football Association) Grimsby Town
22	MF	Jákup Andreasen	31 May 1998 (age 28)	35	3	(Faroe Islands Football Association) KÍ
7	FW	Jóannes Bjartalíð	10 July 1996 (age 30)	42	3	(Kazakhstan Football Federation) Kyzylzhar
9	FW	Páll Klettskarð	17 May 1990 (age 36)	24	0	(Faroe Islands Football Association) KÍ
10	FW	Áki Samuelsen	17 April 2004 (age 22)	2	0	(Swedish Football Association) Mjällby AIF
11	FW	Árni Frederiksberg	12 June 1992 (age 34)	24	4	(Faroe Islands Football Association) KÍ
17	FW	Adrian Justinussen	21 July 1998 (age 28)	21	1	(Danish Football Association) Horsens
18	FW	Petur Knudsen	21 April 1998 (age 28)	29	2	(Faroe Islands Football Association) NSÍ

== Latvia ==
Head coach: (Italy) Paolo Nicolato

No.	Pos.	Player	Date of birth (age)	Caps	Goals	Club
1	GK	Krišjānis Zviedris	21 January 1997 (age 29)	6	0	(Latvian Football Federation) Riga
12	GK	Frenks Dāvids Orols	26 June 2000 (age 26)	0	0	(Latvian Football Federation) Riga
23	GK	Rihards Matrevics	18 March 1999 (age 27)	16	0	(Football Association of the Czech Republic) Dukla Prague
2	DF	Daniels Balodis	10 June 1998 (age 28)	26	1	(Slovak Football Association) Tatran Prešov
3	DF	Vitālijs Jagodinskis	28 February 1992 (age 34)	38	0	(Football Federation of Cambodia) Visakha
4	DF	Roberts Veips	22 February 2000 (age 26)	5	0	(Latvian Football Federation) RFS
5	DF	Antonijs Černomordijs (captain)	26 September 1996 (age 29)	47	4	(Latvian Football Federation) Riga
11	DF	Roberts Savaļnieks	4 February 1993 (age 33)	72	2	(Latvian Football Federation) RFS
13	DF	Raivis Andris Jurkovskis	9 December 1996 (age 29)	59	0	(Latvian Football Federation) Riga
14	DF	Andrejs Cigaņiks	12 April 1997 (age 29)	70	4	(Swiss Football Association) Luzern
19	DF	Maksims Toņiševs	12 May 2000 (age 26)	8	0	(Latvian Football Federation) Riga
21	DF	Deniss Meļņiks	7 September 2002 (age 24)	10	0	(Latvian Football Federation) FK Auda
6	MF	Iļja Korotkovs	24 May 2000 (age 26)	0	0	(Latvian Football Federation) FK Liepāja
7	MF	Eduards Dašķevičs	12 July 2002 (age 24)	24	0	(Latvian Football Federation) FK Auda
8	MF	Kristers Penkevics	28 January 2003 (age 23)	1	0	(Football Association of the Czech Republic) Zlín
10	MF	Mārtiņš Ķigurs	31 March 1997 (age 29)	15	0	(Latvian Football Federation) RFS
15	MF	Dmitrijs Zelenkovs	15 May 2000 (age 26)	24	1	(Latvian Football Federation) RFS
16	MF	Eduards Emsis	23 February 1996 (age 30)	33	2	(Latvian Football Federation) Super Nova
17	MF	Lukass Vapne	31 August 2003 (age 23)	17	0	(Norwegian Football Federation) Sogndal
22	MF	Aleksejs Saveļjevs	30 January 1999 (age 27)	34	1	(Kyrgyz Football Union) Asia Talas
24	MF	Kristaps Grabovskis	14 June 2005 (age 21)	2	0	(Danish Football Association) Boldklubben af 1893
25	MF	Gļebs Žaleiko	27 July 2004 (age 22)	1	0	(Latvian Football Federation) Jelgava
9	FW	Vladislavs Gutkovskis	2 April 1995 (age 31)	61	14	(Polish Football Association) Arka Gdynia
18	FW	Dario Šits	4 February 2004 (age 22)	10	2	(Royal Spanish Football Federation) Atlético Madrid B
20	FW	Marko Regža	20 January 1999 (age 27)	15	0	(Football Association of the Czech Republic) Hradec Králové

== Lithuania ==
Head coach: Edgaras Jankauskas

No.	Pos.	Player	Date of birth (age)	Caps	Goals	Club
1	GK	Arnas Voitinovičius	30 August 2006 (age 20)	0	0	(Portuguese Football Federation) S.L. Benfica
12	GK	Tomas Švedkauskas	22 June 1994 (age 32)	19	0	(Lithuanian Football Federation) FK Kauno Žalgiris
23	GK	Ignas Plūkas	8 December 1993 (age 32)	1	0	(Lithuanian Football Federation) FK Sūduva
2	DF	Artemijus Tutyškinas	8 August 2003 (age 23)	23	0	(Football Association of Slovenia) NK Celje
3	DF	Edgaras Utkus	22 June 2000 (age 26)	27	0	(Saudi Arabian Football Federation) Al-Kholood Club
4	DF	Edvinas Kloniūnas	28 June 1998 (age 28)	2	0	(Lithuanian Football Federation) FK Transinvest
5	DF	Žygimantas Baltrūnas	11 March 2002 (age 24)	2	0	(Lithuanian Football Federation) FK Sūduva
8	DF	Matijus Remeikis	28 March 2003 (age 23)	6	0	(Lithuanian Football Federation) FC Hegelmann
13	DF	Justas Lasickas (captain)	6 October 1997 (age 28)	71	3	(Croatian Football Federation) HNK Rijeka
18	DF	Vilius Armalas	21 July 2000 (age 26)	11	0	(Hungarian Football Federation) MTK Budapest FC
19	DF	Klaudijus Upstas	30 October 1994 (age 31)	14	0	(Lithuanian Football Federation) FK Žalgiris
20	DF	Ričardas Šveikauskas	9 April 1997 (age 29)	0	0	(Lithuanian Football Federation) FK Transinvest
6	MF	Modestas Vorobjovas	30 December 1995 (age 30)	52	1	(Turkish Football Federation) İstanbulspor
7	MF	Eligijus Jankauskas	22 June 1998 (age 28)	14	0	(Israel Football Association) Hapoel Rishon LeZion
10	MF	Tomas Kalinauskas	27 April 2000 (age 26)	12	0	(Royal Dutch Football Association) Roda JC
11	MF	Arvydas Novikovas	18 December 1990 (age 35)	97	12	(Lithuanian Football Federation) FK Riteriai
15	MF	Gvidas Gineitis	15 April 2004 (age 22)	32	5	(Italian Football Federation) Torino FC
16	MF	Lukas Michelbrink	15 April 2005 (age 21)	4	0	(German Football Association) FC Energie Cottbus
17	MF	Domantas Šluta	1 October 2004 (age 21)	2	0	(Lithuanian Football Federation) FK Transinvest
21	MF	Motiejus Burba	10 August 2003 (age 23)	6	0	(Lithuanian Football Federation) FK Kauno Žalgiris
22	MF	Vaidas Magdušauskas	2 December 2003 (age 22)	2	0	(Lithuanian Football Federation) FK Banga
9	FW	Meinardas Mikulėnas	9 July 2002 (age 24)	1	0	(Lithuanian Football Federation) FK Sūduva
14	FW	Armandas Kučys	27 February 2003 (age 23)	19	6	(Football Association of Slovenia) NK Celje
24	FW	Ignas Venckus	17 July 2001 (age 25)	1	0	(Lithuanian Football Federation) FK Banga
