= List of Estonia international footballers born outside Estonia =

This is a list of the players who played, at least once, team for Estonia national football team at major level. Those players have to be born abroad or naturalized.

== List of players ==
Players in bold are currently playing for Estonia. The list is updated as 9 June 2026

The following players:

1. have played at least one game for the full (senior male) Estonia international team; and
2. were born outside Estonia.

Player	Born	Origin	First cap	Last cap	Notes
Andreas Vaikla	1997	(Canada) Toronto	2016	2017	
Markus Poom (Note: Was born and raised in England to Estonian parents, his father is Estonian international goalkeeper Mart Poom.)	1999	(England) Derby	2019	TBD	
Michael Schjønning-Larsen	2001	(Denmark) Stenløse	2024	TBD	

=== Players with only youth caps ===
Player	Born	Origin	First cap	Last cap	Notes
Soufian Gouram	2006	(Germany) Berlin	TBD	TBD	

== List by country of birth ==
Country	Players
Canada	1
England	1
Denmark	1
