= Ravy Tsouka =

Congolese footballer (born 1994)

Personal information
- Full name: Ravy Dieuleriche Tsouka Dozi
- Date of birth: 23 December 1994 (age 31)
- Place of birth: Blois, France
- Height: 1.81 m (5 ft 11 in)
- Position: Right-back

Youth career
- –2014: Nantes

Senior career*
Years	Team	Apps	(Gls)
2013–2014	Nantes B	4	(0)
2015–2017	Crotone	0	(0)
2015–2016	→ Paganese (loan)	21	(0)
2018–2019	Västerås SK	35	(1)
2020–2022	Helsingborgs IF	61	(0)
2022–2023	Zulte Waregem	12	(0)
2023–2024	AEL Limassol	24	(0)
2024–2025	UTA Arad	19	(0)
2026	Semen Padang	15	(0)

International career
2019–2024	Congo	20	(0)
- * Club domestic league appearances and goals as of 23 May 2026

Ravy Dieuleriche Tsouka Dozi (born 23 December 1994) is a professional footballer who plays as a right-back. Born in France, he plays for the Republic of the Congo national team.

== Club career ==
He made his professional Serie C debut for Paganese on 14 November 2015 in a game against Ischia.

On 29 July 2022, Tsouka signed a two-year contract with an option to extend with Zulte Waregem in Belgium.

== International career ==
He made his Congo national football team debut on 10 October 2019 in a friendly against Thailand.

=== International ===
As of match played 11 June 2024

Appearances and goals by national team and year
National team	Year	Apps	Goals
Congo	2019	3	0
Congo	2020	3	0
Congo	2021	8	0
Congo	2022	4	0
Congo	2023	0	0
Congo	2024	2	0
Total		20	0

== Honours ==
Västerås SK

- Division 1: 2018
