= Nicolas Rommens =

Belgian footballer (born 1994)

Personal information
- Date of birth: 17 December 1994 (age 31)
- Place of birth: Lier, Belgium
- Height: 1.83 m (6 ft 0 in)
- Position: Midfielder

Team information
- Current team: Lommel
- Number: 8

Youth career
- 2000–2005: Ternesse VV
- 2005–2006: Lierse
- 2006–2013: Westerlo

Senior career*
| Years | Team | Apps | (Gls) |
| 2013–2015 | Westerlo | 22 | (0) |
| 2015–2016 | Dessel | 31 | (8) |
| 2016–2019 | Westerlo | 75 | (6) |
| 2019–2020 | Roeselare | 25 | (0) |
| 2020–2022 | RWDM | 53 | (11) |
| 2022–2025 | Zulte Waregem | 79 | (4) |
| 2025– | Lommel | 29 | (2) |

International career
| 2010 | Belgium U16 | 2 | (0) |
- * Club domestic league appearances and goals as of 20 April 2026

Nicolas Rommens (born 17 December 1994) is a Belgian professional footballer who plays as a midfielder for Lommel in the Challenger Pro League.

== Club career ==
On 31 August 2013, Rommens made his professional debut for Westerlo in the Belgian Second Division against Visé. One year later, he made his Belgian Pro League debut on 26 July 2014 against Lokeren in a 1–0 home win. He replaced Evander Sno after 43 minutes.

At the age of 20, Rommens moved to second division team Dessel, who had already shown interest in signing him the winter before. Gilles Marchandise and Michiel Jaeken had also made the move from Westerlo to Dessel that summer. Rommens immediately made his mark with Dessel and returned to Westerlo a year later, where he would become a starter.

In the summer of 2019, he left Westerlo for Roeselare, who, like Westerlo, competed in the Belgian First Division B. When his contract expired a year later, he opted for the newly promoted RWDM.

In the summer of 2022, Rommens signed a three-year contract with Zulte Waregem.

On 11 June 2025, Rommens moved to Lommel on a three-year deal.
