= Rasmus Peetson =

Estonian footballer (born 1995)

Personal information
- Full name: Rasmus Peetson
- Date of birth: 3 May 1995 (age 31)
- Place of birth: Pärnu, Estonia
- Height: 1.85 m (6 ft 1 in)
- Positions: Centre-back; defensive midfielder

Team information
- Current team: FCI Levadia
- Number: 6

Youth career
- 2009–2013: Pärnu

Senior career*
Years	Team	Apps	(Gls)
2012	Pärnu Linnameeskond II	21	(8)
2013–2014	Pärnu Linnameeskond	44	(16)
2014–2020	FCI Levadia U21	30	(7)
2014–	FCI Levadia	263	(31)
2017	→ Vaprus (loan)	27	(1)

International career^{‡}
2015–2016	Estonia U21	14	(0)
2016–2018	Estonia U23	2	(0)
2019–	Estonia	31	(3)
- * Club domestic league appearances and goals as of 17 November 2026 ‡ National team caps and goals as of 16 November 2026

Rasmus Peetson (born 3 May 1995) is an Estonian professional footballer who plays as a midfielder for Meistriliiga club Levadia, which he captains, and the Estonia national team.

== International career ==
Peetson made his senior international debut for Estonia on 11 January 2019, in a 2–1 friendly win over Finland. On 19 November 2022 he scored his first goal for the national team, scoring the final goal in a 2-0 2022 Baltic Cup win against Lithuania.

== Career statistics ==
=== International ===
As of match played 16 November 2026

Appearances and goals by national team and year
National team	Year	Apps	Goals
Estonia	2019	2	0
Estonia	2020	0	0
Estonia	2021	0	0
Estonia	2022	2	1
Estonia	2023	9	0
Estonia	2024	6	0
Estonia	2025	6	1
Estonia	2026	6	1
Total		31	3

Estonia score listed first, score column indicates score after each Peetson goal.

List of international goals scored by Rasmus Peetson
No.	Date	Venue	Cap	Opponent	Score	Result	Competition
1	19 November 2022	A. Le Coq Arena, Tallinn, Estonia	4	Lithuania	2–0	2–0	2022 Baltic Cup
2	25 March 2025	Zimbru Stadium, Chișinău, Moldova	21	Moldova	1–0	3–2	2026 FIFA World Cup qualification
3	3 October 2026	A. Le Coq Arena, Tallinn, Estonia	28	Luxembourg	1–0	1–0	2026–27 UEFA Nations League C

== Honours ==
=== Club ===
FCI Levadia

- Meistriliiga: 2014, 2021, 2024
- Estonian Cup: 2017–18, 2020–21, 2023–24
- Estonian Supercup: 2015, 2018, 2022, 2025

Estonia

- Baltic Cup: 2024, 2026

Individual

- Meistriliiga Defender of the Season: 2024
