= Mark Švets =

Estonian footballer (born 1976)

Personal information
- Date of birth: 1 October 1976 (age 50)
- Place of birth: Tallinn, then part of Estonian SSR, Soviet Union
- Height: 1.74 m (5 ft 8 1/2 in)
- Position: Midfielder

Senior career*
Years	Team	Apps	(Gls)
1993–1998	Tallinna Sadam	123	(24)
1999	Flora	6	(0)
1999	Kuressaare	16	(11)
2000	Viljandi Tulevik	13	(1)
2000–2001	Kuressaare	18	(2)
2001	Flora	9	(1)
2002	Levadia	13	(5)
2002	Dynamo St Petersburg	6	(0)
2003	Lasnamäe Ajax	1	(0)
2003	Kairat Almaty	17	(0)
2004	Spartak Nalchik	24	(3)
2004	Uralan Elista	12	(2)
2005	Dynamo Makhachkala	19	(0)
2005	Petrotrest St Petersburg	14	(3)
2006–2007	SKA-Energia Khabarovsk	29	(1)
2008	Smorgon	27	(1)
2009	TJK Legion	13	(4)
2009	Kuressaare	13	(1)
2010	Atletik Tallinn	20	(10)
2012	Maccabi Tallinn	7	(4)

International career^{‡}
1998–2001	Estonia	16	(1)
2010–2011	Estonia (futsal)	5	(2)
- * Club domestic league appearances and goals as of 1 July 2018 ‡ National team caps and goals as of 1 July 2018

Mark Švets (born 1 October 1976) is a retired Estonian professional footballer.

== Club career ==
In a much-travelled career, Švets has played for various clubs in Estonia, Russia, Kazakhstan and Belarus. He won the Kazakhstan Cup in 2003 with FC Kairat.

== International career ==
He made 16 appearances and scored one goal for Estonia national football team between 1998 and 2001.

== Career stats ==
=== Club ===
Season	Club	Country	Level	Apps	Goals
2009	TJK Legion	Estonia	II	3	1
2008	FC Smorgon	Belarus	I	27	1
2007	FC SKA-Energia Khabarovsk	Russia	II	8	0
2006	FC SKA-Energia Khabarovsk	Russia	II	21	1
2005	FC Petrotrest St.Petersburg	Russia	II	14	3
2005	FC Dynamo Makhachkala	Russia	II	19	0
2004	Uralan Elista	Russia	II	12	2
2004	PFC Spartak Nalchik	Russia	II	24	3
2003	FC Kairat Almaty	Kazakhstan	I	17	0
2003	FC Ajax Lasnamäe	Estonia	II	1	0
2002	FC Dynamo St.Petersburg	Russia	II	6	0
2002	FC Levadia Tallinn	Estonia	I	13	5
2001	FC Flora Tallinn	Estonia	I	9	1
2001	FC Kuressaare	Estonia	I	9	1
2000	FC Kuressaare	Estonia	I	9	1
2000	JK Tulevik Viljandi	Estonia	I	13	1
1999	FC Kuressaare	Estonia	II	16	11
1998-99	FC Flora Tallinn	Estonia	I	6	0
1998	Tallinna Sadam JK	Estonia	I	13	5
1997	Tallinna Sadam JK	Estonia	I	24	3
1996	Tallinna Sadam JK	Estonia	I	23	0
1995	Tallinna Sadam JK	Estonia	I	19	6
1994	Tallinna Sadam JK	Estonia	I	22	4
1993	Tallinna Sadam JK	Estonia	II	22	6
