= Toomas Tohver =

Estonian footballer

Personal information
- Full name: Toomas Tohver
- Date of birth: 24 April 1973 (age 53)
- Place of birth: Pärnu, then part of Estonian SSR, Soviet Union
- Height: 1.94 m (6 ft 4 in)
- Position: Goalkeeper

Team information
- Current team: JK Retro

Senior career*
Years	Team	Apps	(Gls)
1992–1997	FC Flora	43	(0)
1997	Visby IF	22	(0)
1997	Vall Tallinn	9	(0)
1998–2001	FC Flora	42	(0)
2001–2004	Hønefoss BK	5	(0)
2005	Trøgstad/Båstad		
2007–2008	Viljandi Tulevik	31	(0)
2008	Flora Rakvere	11	(0)
2009–	JK Retro		

International career
1994–2000	Estonia	24	(0)
- * Club domestic league appearances and goals

Toomas Tohver (born 24 April 1973) is a retired Estonian international football goalkeeper, with 24 caps to his name. Tohver started his professional career at Flora Tallinn and had two spells abroad, first in Sweden and then in Norway.
