= Oliver Jürgens =

Estonian footballer

Personal information
- Date of birth: 10 May 2003 (age 23)
- Place of birth: Tallinn, Estonia
- Height: 1.80 m (5 ft 11 in)
- Position: Forward

Team information
- Current team: Teuta
- Number: 10

Youth career
- 2008–2011: Ajax Lasnamäe
- 2011–2012: Levadia Tallinn
- 2012–2013: Kalev Tallinn
- 2013–2014: Harju
- 2014: Volga Nizhny Novgorod
- 2014–2015: Nõmme Kalju
- 2016–2019: Nõmme United

Senior career*
Years	Team	Apps	(Gls)
2018–2019	Nõmme United	25	(35)
2019–2020	Hellas Verona	0	(0)
2020	→ Roma (loan)	0	(0)
2020–2022	Inter Milan	0	(0)
2022–2023	Torino	0	(0)
2023–2024	Újpest	6	(0)
2024	DAC Dunajská Streda	6	(0)
2024–2025	Ponferradina	5	(0)
2025	Elche Ilicitano	12	(3)
2026–	Teuta	17	(0)

International career^{‡}
2018	Estonia U16	1	(0)
2023–2024	Estonia	3	(0)
- * Club domestic league appearances and goals as of 13 May 2026 ‡ National team caps and goals as of 25 June 2025

Oliver Jürgens (born 10 May 2003) is an Estonian professional footballer who plays as a forward for Teuta.

== Career ==
Jürgens began playing football at the age of 5 with his local club Ajax Lasnamäe, and went through the youth academies of Estonian clubs Levadia Tallinn, Kalev Tallinn, Harju JK, before moving to Russia briefly with Volga in 2014. He returned to Estonia with Nõmme Kalju in 2014, and in 2015 started gaining worldwide attention from scouts after scoring 29 goals in 7 games in a youth tournament. In 2016 he joined other football club located in Nõmme region, Nõmme United. In 2018, he was promoted to Nõmme United's first team in the Estonian third division scoring 7 goals in 8 games in debut season. In 2019 he only played first half of the season, scoring 28 goals in just 17 games.

On 20 August 2019, he signed a professional contract with the Italian club Hellas Verona. On 20 January 2020, he signed on a brief loan with Roma for the second half of the 2019–20 season. On 21 September 2021, he moved to Inter Milan. On 19 August 2022, he moved to Torino.

On 5 September 2023, Jürgens moved to the Hungarian club Újpest. He made his professional debut with Újpest as a substitute in a 2–0 Nemzeti Bajnokság I loss to MTK on 23 September 2023.

On 30 January 2024, Jürgens signed a three-and-a-half-year contract with DAC Dunajská Streda in Slovakia.

On 20 August 2024, Jürgens signed for Spanish Primera Federación – Group 1 club Ponferradina.

== International career ==
Jürgens is a youth international for Estonia, having played once for the Estonia U16s in May 2018. He was first called up to the senior international Estonia in October 2023. He made his senior international debut for the senior Estonia in a 2–0 UEFA Euro 2024 qualifying loss to Austria on 16 November 2023.

== Honours ==
Nõmme United FC

- Esiliiga B: 2019
