= Jelle Goes =

Dutch football manager (born 1970)

Personal information
- Full name: Jelle Quirinus Goes
- Date of birth: 26 March 1970 (age 56)
- Place of birth: Hilversum, Netherlands
- Position: Midfielder

Youth career
- 1978–1988: SV Huizen

Senior career*
Years	Team	Apps	(Gls)
1988–1992	GVVV		

Managerial career
- 1992–1995: GVVV
- 1996–2001: Netherlands U-14, U-15, U-23
- 2001–2004: Estonia U-21
- 2000–2004: Estonia (asst.)
- 2004–2007: Estonia
- 2008–2009: CSKA-2 Moscow
- 2010–2012: PSV (Head of Academy)
- 2012–2013: Anzhi Makhachkala (Sports Dir.)
- 2018–2021: Utrecht (Head of Academy)
- 2021–2023: Israel (Sports Dir.)
- 2023: UEFA (Head of Development)
- 2023–: Feyenoord (Recruitment)
- * Club domestic league appearances and goals

Jelle Quirinus Goes (born 26 March 1970) is a Dutch football manager.

Goes was born in Hilversum. Goes was manager of the Estonia national football team from 2 October 2004 to 29 June 2007; before that he was assistant coach under Arno Pijpers of the same team. He worked from 1996 to 2001 for the Royal Dutch Football Association and coached U-14, U-15 and U-23. In 2001, he coached the U-21 from Estonia and was director for the U-16 and U-20.

He was a director of the school of the PFC CSKA Moscow from 2007 to 2010. Since 2010, he worked for PSV as a Youth Academy director. In October 2012 he signed with FC Anzhi Makhachkala as a sporting director. He was named Head of FC Utrecht's academy in 2018 after leaving his job at the Dutch FA. On March 8, 2021, he signed as the sports director for Israeli youth teams.

In 2023 Goes was appointed Recruitment & Development manager at Feyenoord, after he had left Israel for a job at UEFA.
