= Jevgeni Novikov =

Estonian footballer

Personal information
- Date of birth: 28 June 1980 (age 46)
- Place of birth: Narva, then part of Estonian SSR, Soviet Union
- Height: 1.82 m (6 ft 0 in)
- Positions: Midfielder; defender

Team information
- Current team: JK Retro

Senior career*
Years	Team	Apps	(Gls)
1996–2000	FC Trans Narva	61	(0)
2001–2002	FC Flora Tallinn	32	(0)
2002	FC Valga	5	(0)
2003	FC Kuressaare	11	(2)
2003–2004	Zirka Kirovohrad	7	(0)
2004–2005	Tom Tomsk	3	(0)
2006	FC Flora Tallinn	11	(1)
2007	Sodovik Sterlitamak	11	(0)
2007–2008	FK Rīga	19	(0)
2008	→ Dynamo Barnaul (loan)	11	(0)
2009	JK Nõmme Kalju	21	(0)
2010	FC Okzhetpes	13	(1)
2010	FF Jaro	3	(0)
2011	FC Levadia Tallinn	9	(0)
2014–	JK Retro		

International career
2001–2008	Estonia	13	(2)
- * Club domestic league appearances and goals

Jevgeni Aleksandrovitš Novikov (born 28 June 1980) is an Estonian former professional international footballer. He played the position of central and defensive midfielder.

== Club career ==
Novikov started his career in Narva Trans. In 2001, he joined FC Flora Tallinn. He had spells in Ukraine and Russia, playing for Tom Tomsk, in the Russian Premier League. He rejoined FC Flora Tallinn in 2006, but moved to the Russian First Division, after just one season with the club. Again after just a season he moved to the Latvian Higher League to FK Rīga, from where he was loaned to Dynamo Barnaul. His last club was FF Jaro.

=== Nõmme Kalju ===
On 23 February 2009, it was announced that Novikov had signed a one-year contract with Nõmme Kalju.

=== Bradford City A.F.C. ===
In July 2009, he was given a trial with Bradford City.

=== FC Okzhetpes ===
In 2010, he played for FC Okzhetpes in Kazakhstan Premier League.

=== FF Jaro ===
On 31 August 2010, he signed a contract with Veikkausliiga club FF Jaro.

=== FC Levadia Tallinn ===
In March 2011 he signed with Estonian Meistriliiga club FC Levadia Tallinn.
