= Andrei Stepanov (footballer) =

Estonian footballer

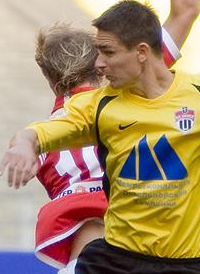
- Stepanov playing for Khimki

Personal information
- Full name: Andrei Stepanov
- Date of birth: 16 March 1979 (age 47)
- Place of birth: Tallinn, then part of Estonian SSR, Soviet Union
- Height: 6 ft 2 in (1.88 m)
- Position: Defender

Youth career
- 1994–1996: Tallinna Jalgpallikool

Senior career*
Years	Team	Apps	(Gls)
1996–1998	TVMK Tallinn	16	(0)
1998–1999	Lelle	43	(0)
2000–2003	Flora Tallinn	98	(0)
2004–2006	Torpedo Moscow	58	(2)
2007–2008	Khimki	33	(1)
2009	Watford	1	(0)
2009–2010	Neftchi Baku	2	(0)
2010	Khimki	8	(0)
2011	Gomel	24	(2)
2012	Aris Limassol	10	(1)
2013	Infonet II Tallinn	8	(0)
2014–2017	Retro Tallinn	47	(14)
Total		348	(20)

International career
1999–2012	Estonia	89	(1)
- * Club domestic league appearances and goals

Andrei Stepanov (born 16 March 1979) is an Estonian former professional footballer. He played the position of defender.

== Club career ==
2009 he received a short-term contract with Watford F.C., when manager Brendan Rodgers looked to add experience and defensive cover to his squad. On 7 April 2009 he made the league debut (and what proved to be his only appearance) for his new club as a late substitute against Southampton in a 2–2 draw. Despite playing little, Stepanov expressed satisfaction with his time at Watford.

In February 2011, he was on a trial at Swedish Allsvenskan side Syrianska FC. On 16 March 2011, he signed a 1+1 year deal with Belarusian Premier League newcomers FC Gomel after a successful trial. He scored his first goal for Gomel on 2 April 2011, in a 1–1 draw against FC Naftan Novopolotsk.

== International career ==
He was an Estonia national football team regular with over 80 caps to his name, and often played alongside Raio Piiroja in the national side at the heart of defense. Just like Piiroja, he joined FC Flora Tallinn under then manager Teitur Thordarson, before heading off to Russia.

== Career stats ==
=== Club ===
Season	Club	Country	Level	Apps	Goals
2012	Aris Limassol F.C.	Cyprus	I	10	1
2011	FC Gomel	Belarus	I	24	2
2010	FC Khimki	Russia	II	8	0
2009/10	Neftchi Baku PFC	Azerbaijan	I	2	0
2009	Watford	England	II	1	0
2008	FC Khimki	Russia	I	10	1
2007	FC Khimki	Russia	I	23	0
2006	FC Torpedo Moscow	Russia	I	16	0
2005	FC Torpedo Moscow	Russia	I	24	1
2004	FC Torpedo Moscow	Russia	I	18	1
2003	FC Flora Tallinn	Estonia	I	26	3
2002	FC Flora Tallinn	Estonia	I	22	2
2001	FC Flora Tallinn	Estonia	I	26	1
2000	FC Flora Tallinn	Estonia	I	24	0
1999	Lelle SK	Estonia	I	21	0
1998	Lelle SK	Estonia	I	22	0
1997/98	FC TVMK Tallinn	Estonia	I	3	0
1996/97	FC TVMK Tallinn	Estonia	I	12	0
1995/96	FC TVMK Tallinn	Estonia	I	1	0

== Honours ==
=== Club ===
- FC Flora Tallinn
  - Estonian Top Division: 2001, 2002, 2003
    - runners up: 2000
  - Estonian Cup
    - runners up: 2001, 2003
  - Estonian SuperCup: 2002, 2003
- FC Gomel
  - Belarusian Cup: 2011

=== Individual ===
- Estonian Footballer of the Year: 2004
