= Kristers Penkevics =

Latvian footballer (born 2003)

Personal information
- Date of birth: 18 January 2003 (age 23)
- Place of birth: Latvia
- Height: 1.80 m (5 ft 11 in)
- Positions: Defender; midfielder

Team information
- Current team: Zlín
- Number: 5

Youth career
- Tukums 2000

Senior career*
Years	Team	Apps	(Gls)
2019–2021	Tukums 2000	30	(0)
2022–2024	Valmiera	32	(1)
2024–2025	→ Valmiera II (loan)	7	(2)
2025	Jelgava	33	(2)
2026–	Zlín	9	(0)
2026–	→ Zlín B (loan)	3	(0)

International career^{‡}
2019	Latvia U17	11	(2)
2021	Latvia U19	3	(0)
2022–2024	Latvia U21	7	(0)
2025–	Latvia	4	(0)
- * Club domestic league appearances and goals as of 23 May 2026 ‡ National team caps and goals as of 9 June 2026

Kristers Penkevics (born 18 January 2003) is a Latvian professional footballer who plays as a defender or midfielder for Zlín.

== Club career ==
As a youth player, Penkevics joined the youth academy of Latvian side Tukums 2000 and was promoted to the club's senior team in 2019, where he made thirty league appearances and scored zero goals and helped the club achieve promotion from the second tier to the top flight.

Ahead of the 2022 season, he signed for Latvian side Valmiera, where he made thirty-two league appearances and scored one goal and helped the club win the league title. Three years later, he signed for Latvian side Jelgava, where he made thirty-three league appearances and scored two goals. Following his stint there, he signed for Czech side Zlín.

== International career ==
Penkevics is a Latvia international. During the summer of 2026, he played for the Latvia national football team at the 2026 Baltic Cup.

== Personal life ==
Penkevics was born on 18 January 2003. Born in Latvia, he enjoys reading as a hobby.
