= Gullbrandur Øregaard =

Faroese footballer (born 2001)

Personal information
- Full name: Gullbrandur í Horni Øregaard
- Date of birth: 18 July 2002 (age 24)
- Height: 1.90 m (6 ft 3 in)
- Positions: Centre-back; defensive midfielder

Team information
- Current team: Sandnes Ulf
- Number: 5

Youth career
- –2014: Forus og Gausel
- 2015–2020: Hinna
- 2021: Sandnes Ulf

Senior career*
Years	Team	Apps	(Gls)
2019–2020	Hinna	10	(0)
2021–	Sandnes Ulf	95	(7)

International career^{‡}
2024–	Faroe Islands	2	(0)
- * Club domestic league appearances and goals as of 1 June 2026 ‡ National team caps and goals as of 1 June 2026

Gullbrandur í Horni Øregaard (born 1 January 2001) is a Faroese footballer who plays as a centre-back for Sandnes Ulf, which he also captains.

== Career ==
Øregaard played for Forus og Gausel as a child, shifting to another Stavanger club Hinna in 2015. Having made his senior debut in the Fourth Division (fifth tier) in 2018, the 2020 season was cancelled due to COVID-19, and he moved to the larger club Sandnes Ulf in 2021. He played two cup games in March before making his league debut in the 2021 1. divisjon in August.

He played for Faroese youth international teams. He made his senior international debut in the 2024 Baltic Cup, to which the Faroe Islands were invited, in a loss against Latvia. He was again called up in 2025, and for the 2026 Baltic Cup as well.

Following Sandnes Ulf's relegation in 2024, he led the attempt to win re-promotion from the 2025 Norwegian Second Division, being team captain. The attempt was successful.

== Personal life ==
He is nicknamed "Gulli". He took up studies in business administration at the University of Stavanger.
