= Tony Varjund =

Estonian footballer (born 2007)

Personal information
- Date of birth: 21 June 2007 (age 19)
- Place of birth: Tallinn, Estonia
- Height: 6 ft 4 in (1.94 m)
- Position: Striker

Team information
- Current team: Flora
- Number: 14

Youth career
- 2014–2017: Harju
- 2017–2021: Tallinna Kalev
- 2025: FC Utrecht
- 2026: Flora

Senior career*
Years	Team	Apps	(Gls)
2022	Flora U19	1	(0)
2022–2024	Flora U21	52	(13)
2022–	Flora	65	(12)
2025–2026	→ Jong FC Utrecht (loan)	5	(0)

International career^{‡}
2022–2023	Estonia U17	13	(4)
2024	Estonia U19	7	(1)
2024–	Estonia U21	7	(2)
2026–	Estonia	2	(1)
- * Club domestic league appearances and goals as of 17 November 2026 ‡ National team caps and goals as of 9 June 2026

Tony Varjund (born 21 June 2007) is an Estonian professional footballer who plays as a striker for Meistriliiga club Flora and the Estonia national team.

== Club career ==
=== Flora ===
Varjund made his debut for Flora on 17 August 2022 in a 2022–23 Estonian Cup tie against Legion, coming on as a late substitute and scoring the final goal in a 6–0 win.

==== FC Utrecht (loan) ====
On 23 January 2025, Varjund joined Dutch side FC Utrecht on a loan which was later extended until the end of the 2025–26 season. However, his loan was terminated on 13 January 2026.

== International career ==
Varjund has competed for the Estonia under-17s, under-19s and under-21s.

On 27 May 2026, Varjund was named in Estonia's squad for the 2026 Baltic Cup. He made his senior debut on 6 June, scoring the only goal in a win against Faroe Islands.

== Career statistics ==
=== International ===
As of match played 9 June 2026

Appearances and goals by national team and year
National team	Year	Apps	Goals
Estonia	2026	2	1
Total		2	1

Scores and results list Estonia's goal tally first, score column indicates score after each Varjund goal.

List of international goals scored by Tony Varjund
No.	Date	Venue	Cap	Opponent	Score	Result	Competition
1	6 June 2026	Pärnu Rannastaadion, Pärnu, Estonia	1	Faroe Islands	1–0	1–0	2026 Baltic Cup

== Honours ==
Flora

- Meistriliiga: 2022, 2023
- Estonian Cup: 2025–26
- Estonian Supercup: 2024

Estonia

- Baltic Cup: 2026
