= Markus Poom =

Estonian footballer (born 1999)

Personal information
- Date of birth: 27 February 1999 (age 27)
- Place of birth: Derby, England
- Height: 1.87 m (6 ft 2 in)
- Position: Midfielder

Team information
- Current team: Trenčín
- Number: 18

Youth career
- 2007–2009: Watford
- 2010–2015: Nõmme United

Senior career*
Years	Team	Apps	(Gls)
2015	Nõmme United	14	(7)
2016	Flora III	1	(0)
2016–2017	Flora II	37	(4)
2016–2026	Flora	180	(31)
2023–2024	→ Shamrock Rovers (loan)	55	(4)
2026–	Trenčín	15	(1)

International career^{‡}
2014	Estonia U16	2	(0)
2015	Estonia U17	9	(1)
2016–2017	Estonia U19	22	(0)
2017–	Estonia U21	9	(1)
2019–	Estonia	40	(0)
Medal record
Representing Estonia
Men's football
FIFA Series
Runner-up	2026 Rwanda
- * Club domestic league appearances and goals as of 1 August 2026 ‡ National team caps and goals as of 16 November 2026

Markus Poom (born 27 February 1999) is an Estonian professional footballer who plays as a midfielder for Trenčín. Born in the England, he plays for the Estonia national team.

== Early life ==
Markus Poom was born in Derby, England, to Estonian parents Lissel and footballer Mart Poom. His father is an international goalkeeper. At the time, he played for the Estonian national team and was a professional footballer for Derby County. His family moved back to Estonia around age 11, where he grew up.

== Club career ==
Poom began his career at FC Nõmme United, of which his father, Mart Poom, is the president. In 2016, he joined Estonian champions FC Flora, initially linking up with their under-21 side before being promoted to their senior squad the following year. By the end of 2022, he played 194 games, scoring 41 goals and providing 46 assists.

On 16 January 2023, Poom joined League of Ireland Premier Division club Shamrock Rovers on loan for the entirety of the 2023 season. On 6 January 2024, it was announced that Poom's loan had been extended for another season. In his final game for Rovers on 19 December 2024, he scored away to Chelsea at Stamford Bridge in the UEFA Conference League, in what he described as the best week of his life, having also become a father in the days prior to the fixture. He made 70 appearances in total for Rovers, scoring six goals and recording eleven assists.

== International career ==
Poom was an Estonian youth international. He made his international debut for the senior Estonia team on 11 January 2019, coming on as a half-time substitute for Brent Lepistu in a 2–1 friendly win over Finland.

== Personal life ==
Markus Poom married his partner Rebeca in 2024 and they had their first child, a girl called Matilde.

== Career statistics ==
=== International ===
As of match played 16 November 2026

Appearances and goals by national team and year
National team	Year	Apps	Goals
Estonia	2019	2	0
Estonia	2020	0	0
Estonia	2021	10	0
Estonia	2022	1	0
Estonia	2023	8	0
Estonia	2024	8	0
Estonia	2025	4	0
Estonia	2026	7	0
Total		40	0

== Honours ==
Flora

- Meistriliiga: 2017, 2019, 2020, 2022
- Estonian Cup: 2019–20

Shamrock Rovers

- League of Ireland Premier Division: 2023

Estonia

- Baltic Cup: 2026
- FIFA Series runner-up: 2026

== See also ==
- List of Estonia international footballers born outside Estonia
