= Kaur Kivila =

Estonian footballer (born 2003)

Personal information
- Date of birth: 22 November 2003 (age 22)
- Place of birth: Tartu, Estonia
- Height: 6 ft 4 in (1.93 m)
- Position: Goalkeeper

Team information
- Current team: Flora
- Number: 99

Youth career
- 2012–2020: Santos
- 2020–2022: Hellas Verona

Senior career*
Years	Team	Apps	(Gls)
2019–2020	Welco	31	(0)
2022–2023	Hellas Verona	0	(0)
2022–2023	→ Carpi (loan)	3	(0)
2023–2025	Flora U21	20	(0)
2023–	Flora	30	(0)
2024	→ Kuressaare (loan)	33	(0)

International career^{‡}
2018	Estonia U16	2	(0)
2018	Estonia U17	2	(0)
2022–2024	Estonia U21	16	(0)
2026–	Estonia	1	(0)
Medal record
Representing Estonia
Men's football
FIFA Series
Runner-up	2026 Rwanda
- * Club domestic league appearances and goals as of 17 November 2026 ‡ National team caps and goals as of 31 March 2026

Kaur Kivila (born 22 November 2003) is an Estonian professional footballer who plays as a goalkeeper for Meistriliiga club Flora and the Estonia national team.

== Club career ==
=== Flora ===
Kivila signed for Flora on 4 August 2023.

==== Kuressaare (loan) ====
On 20 February 2024, Kivila signed for Kuressaare on loan until the end of the season. He made his Meistriliiga debut on 17 March 2024 in a 3–2 away defeat to Vaprus.

== International career ==
Kivila has competed for the Estonia under-16s, under-17s and under-21s.

On 20 March 2026, Kivila was called up to the Estonia squad by manager Jürgen Henn for the 2026 FIFA Series matches in Rwanda. He made his senior debut on 30 March 2026 in a 2–0 defeat to Rwanda.

== Honours ==
Flora

- Meistriliiga: 2025

Estonia

- FIFA Series runner-up: 2026
