= Urmas Kaljend =

Estonian footballer

Personal information
- Full name: Urmas Kaljend
- Date of birth: 24 July 1964 (age 62)
- Place of birth: Tallinn, then part of Estonian SSR, Soviet Union
- Position: Defender

International career^{‡}
Years	Team	Apps	(Gls)
1992–1994	Estonia	20	(0)
- ‡ National team caps and goals as of 4 November 2007

Urmas Kaljend (born 24 July 1964) is a retired Estonian professional footballer, who played as a defender. He was affiliated with FC Norma Tallinn, SK Tallinna Sport and TVMK Tallinn. Kaljend also played in Finland, for IFK Mariehamn, KPV, LoPa, and FC Ilves.

== International career ==
He won a total number of 20 international caps for the Estonia national football team during the 1990s, scoring no goals. Kaljend earned his first official cap as a substitute on 1992-06-03, when Estonia played Slovenia in a friendly match.
