= Karel Mustmaa =

Estonian footballer (born 2005)

Personal information
- Date of birth: 8 August 2005 (age 21)
- Place of birth: Võru Parish, Estonia
- Height: 1.87 m (6 ft 2 in)
- Positions: Winger; forward

Team information
- Current team: Čukarički
- Number: 18

Youth career
- 2012–2014: Võru Helios
- 2014–2021: Harju
- 2021–2025: Benfica

Senior career*
Years	Team	Apps	(Gls)
2021	Harju	6	(4)
2025–	PAOK B	23	(4)
2026–	→ Čukarički	3	(1)

International career^{‡}
2021–2022	Estonia U17	7	(3)
2022	Estonia U18	3	(0)
2023	Estonia U19	14	(1)
2024–	Estonia U21	10	(3)
2025–	Estonia	11	(1)
- * Club domestic league appearances and goals as of 9 October 2026 ‡ National team caps and goals as of 16 November 2026

Karel Mustmaa (born 8 August 2005) is an Estonian professional footballer who plays as a winger or forward for Serbian Superliga club Čukarički on loan from PAOK B and the Estonia national team.

== Club career ==
Born in Võru, Mustmaa started playing football with local side Võru Helios before moving to youth academy of Estonian side Harju in 2014 and was promoted to the club's senior team in 2021, where he made six league appearances and scored four goals.

Following his stint there, he joined the youth academy of Portuguese side Benfica the same year, where he played in the UEFA Youth League. Ahead of the 2025–26 season, he signed for Greek side PAOK B.

== International career ==
Mustmaa is an Estonia youth international. During the autumn of 2025, he was first called up to the Estonia national football team for 2026 FIFA World Cup qualification.

== Style of play ==
Mustmaa plays as a winger or forward and is left-footed. Estonian news website Soccernet.ee wrote in 2025 that his "trump cards are quick openings and runs. In the past, he has also boasted of winning duels, as he can often put his foot in the right place and grab the ball".

== Career statistics ==
=== International ===
As of match played 16 November 2026

Appearances and goals by national team and year
National team	Year	Apps	Goals
Estonia	2025	2	0
Estonia	2026	9	1
Total		11	1

Scores and results list Estonia's goal tally first, score column indicates score after each Mustmaa goal.

List of international goals scored by Karel Mustmaa
No.	Date	Venue	Cap	Opponent	Score	Result	Competition
1	9 June 2026	A. Le Coq Arena, Tallinn, Estonia	5	Lithuania	1–0	1–0	2026 Baltic Cup

== Honours ==
Estonia

- Baltic Cup: 2026
