= Kevor Palumets =

Estonian footballer (born 2002)

Personal information
- Full name: Kevor Palumets
- Date of birth: 21 November 2002 (age 24)
- Place of birth: Keila, Estonia
- Height: 1.87 m (6 ft 2 in)
- Position: Midfielder

Team information
- Current team: FC Košice

Youth career
- 2009–2015: Keila
- 2016–2019: Tabasalu
- 2019–2020: Bologna

Senior career*
Years	Team	Apps	(Gls)
2018–2019	Tabasalu	17	(5)
2020–2022	Paide	49	(2)
2020–2022	→ Paide II	44	(30)
2022–2024	Zulte Waregem	12	(0)
2022–2024	→ Jong Essevee	13	(2)
2024	→ HJK (loan)	11	(1)
2025–2026	Podbrezová	45	(3)
2026–	FC Košice	7	(2)

International career^{‡}
2019	Estonia U18	2	(0)
2021–2023	Estonia U21	14	(0)
2024–	Estonia	27	(2)
- * Club domestic league appearances and goals as of 25 May 2026 ‡ National team caps and goals as of 16 November 2026

Kevor Palumets (born 21 November 2002) is an Estonian professional footballer who plays as a midfielder for FC Košice , and the Estonia national team.

== Club career ==
As a youth Palumets was part of hometown club Keila JK. He spent seven years at the club before being invited to join JK Tabasalu at age 14. At age 16, he moved to Bologna of the Italian Serie A for one season. He made his debut for the under-17 side on 18 March 2019 in a league match against Udinese. In 2020 he returned to Estonia to join Paide Linnameeskond. Over the next few seasons he would go on to make forty-nine appearances for the club in the Meistriliiga and an additional five in the UEFA Europa Conference League. Paluments was also part of the club's reserve team in the Esiliiga B. In 2020 he was named the league's best player after scoring twenty-one goals in twenty-three league appearances.

After two and a half years at Paide Linnameeskond, Palumets joined Zulte Waregem of the Belgian Pro League in September 2022. The initial three-year deal included a club option for another. Zulte Waregem originally spotted the player in Paide Linnameeskond's 2022–23 UEFA Europa Conference League match against Anderlecht. Palumets made an immediate impact for Waregem's under-21 side, scoring against K.S.C. Lokeren-Temse on his debut. He made his league debut for the senior squad on 11 September 2022 in a match against Gent. He entered the match as a 56th-minute substitute in the eventual 0–2 defeat.

On 3 July 2024, Palumets joined Veikkausliiga club HJK Helsinki on loan for the rest of the 2024 season with the purchase option. He debuted in the league on 6 July, as a substitute in a 3–0 away defeat against Ilves. On 14 September, Palumets scored his first goal in the league, in a 2–2 home draw against SJK Seinäjoki.

== National career ==
=== Debut and Breakthrough ===
Palumets made his debut for the Estonian men's national football team on 12 January 2024 in a friendly match against Sweden during the squad's training camp in Cyprus. The match, which took place as part of the team's preparations for the Euro 2024 qualifiers, saw Estonia narrowly lose 1–2 to Sweden.

Palumets broke the scoreboard after 19 minutes by winning the ball in the Swedish penalty area and scoring the first goal.

== Career statistics ==
=== Club ===
As of 12 March 2025

Appearances and goals by club, season and competition
Club	Season	League			Cup		League cup		Europe		Other		Total	
Club	Season	Division	Apps	Goals	Apps	Goals	Apps	Goals	Apps	Goals	Apps	Goals	Apps	Goals
Tabasalu	2019	Esiliiga B	17	4	2	0	—		—		—		19	4
Paide	2020	Meistriliiga	6	0	2	0	—		—		—		8	0
Paide	2021	Meistriliiga	20	1	0	0	—		0	0	0	0	20	1
Paide	2022	Meistriliiga	23	1	0	0	—		5 (Note: Appearances in UEFA Europa Conference League)	0	—		28	1
Paide	Total		49	2	2	0	—		5	0	0	0	56	2
Paide II	2020	Esiliiga B	23	21	—		—		—		—		23	21
Paide II	2021	Esiliiga	16	9	—		—		—		—		16	9
Paide II	2022	Esiliiga	5	0	—		—		—		—		5	0
Paide II	Total		44	30	—		—		—		—		44	30
Zulte Waregem	2022–23	Belgian Pro League	3	0	0	0	—		—		—		3	0
Zulte Waregem	2023–24	Challenger Pro League	7	0	2	0	—		—		1 (Note: Appearances in Promotion play-offs)	0	10	0
Zulte Waregem	Total		11	0	2	0	—		—		—		13	0
Jong Essevee	2022–23	Belgian Division 2	3	2	—		—		—		—		3	2
Jong Essevee	2023–24	Belgian Division 2	10	0	—		—		—		—		10	0
Jong Essevee	Total		13	2	—		—		—		—		13	2
HJK Helsinki (loan)	2024	Veikkausliiga	11	1	0	0	0	0	7 (Note: Appearances in UEFA Champions League and UEFA Conference League)	0	—		18	1
Podbrezová	2024–25	Slovak First League	5	0	0	0	—		—		—		5	0
Career total			150	39	6	0	0	0	12	0	0	0	168	39

=== International ===
As of match played 16 November 2026

Appearances and goals by national team and year
National team	Year	Apps	Goals
Estonia	2024	10	1
Estonia	2025	7	0
Estonia	2026	10	1
Total		27	2

Scores and results list Estonia's goal tally first, score column indicates score after each Palumets goal.

List of international goals scored by Kevor Palumets
No.	Date	Venue	Cap	Opponent	Score	Result	Competition
1	12 January 2024	Stelios Kyriakides Stadium, Paphos, Cyprus	1	Sweden	1–0	1–2	Friendly
2	16 November 2026	A. Le Coq Arena, Tallinn, Estonia	27	Bulgaria	2–1	2–1	2026–27 UEFA Nations League C

== Honours ==
Paide Linnameeskond

- Estonian Cup: 2021–22
