= Ioan Yakovlev =

Estonian footballer (born 1998)

Personal information
- Full name: Ioan Yakovlev
- Date of birth: 19 January 1998 (age 28)
- Place of birth: Narva, Estonia
- Height: 1.65 m (5 ft 5 in)
- Position: Winger

Team information
- Current team: Panionios
- Number: 7

Youth career
- 2008–2009: Sillamäe Kalev
- 2010–2013: Levadia
- 2014: Zenit Saint Petersburg

Senior career*
Years	Team	Apps	(Gls)
2015–2016	Levadia III	6	(1)
2015–2016	Levadia U21	58	(15)
2017	Narva Trans	35	(2)
2018–2019	Tallinna Kalev	32	(3)
2018	Tallinna Kalev U21	5	(1)
2019–2020	Arandina	17	(1)
2020	Peña Deportiva	0	(0)
2020–2021	Arandina	12	(1)
2021	Torrijos	3	(0)
2022	Tallinna Kalev	33	(6)
2023–2024	Levadia	66	(8)
2025–	Panionios	32	(2)

International career^{‡}
2023–	Estonia	14	(1)
Medal record
Representing Estonia
Men's football
FIFA Series
Runner-up	2026 Rwanda
- * Club domestic league appearances and goals as of 20 April 2026 ‡ National team caps and goals as of 30 March 2026

Ioan Yakovlev (born 19 January 1998) is an Estonian professional footballer who plays as a winger for Greek Super League 2 club Panionios and the Estonia national team.

== Club career ==
Yakovlev played for Tallinna Kalev in Meistriliiga for the 2022 season. He was awarded Meistriliiga Player of the Month in May. At the end of the season his goal on 15 October 2022 against Paide Linnameeskond was tied in the Goal of the Season vote. He finished the season with 6 goals in 33 matches and the highest number of assists in the league (13).

In December 2022 he signed a two-and-a-half-year deal with FCI Levadia.

== International career ==
Yakovlev made his senior international debut for Estonia on 8 January 2023, in a 1–1 draw against Iceland in a friendly.

== Personal life ==
He held Estonian citizenship, but had to give it up and take Russian citizenship when he joined the academy of Zenit Saint Petersburg. Yakovlev regained Estonian citizenship in 2022.

== International goals ==
No.	Date	Venue	Opponent	Score	Result	Competition
1.	11 October 2024	Lilleküla Stadium, Tallinn, Estonia	Azerbaijan	1–0	3–1	2024–25 UEFA Nations League

== Honours ==
Estonia

- FIFA Series runner-up: 2026

Individual

- Meistriliiga Player of the Month: May 2022,
- Meistriliiga Goal of the Month: October 2022
