= Soufian Gouram =

Estonian footballer (born 2006)

Personal information
- Date of birth: 1 May 2006 (age 20)
- Place of birth: Berlin, Germany
- Height: 1.87 m (6 ft 2 in)
- Position: Midfielder

Team information
- Current team: Hertha BSC
- Number: 33

Youth career
- –2014: Berliner FC Dynamo
- 2015: Füchse Berlin Reinickendorf
- 2015: Hertha Zehlendorf
- 2015–2017: Hertha BSC
- 2017: Berliner FC Dynamo
- 2017–2019: Tennis Borussia Berlin
- 2019–2025: Hertha BSC

Senior career*
Years	Team	Apps	(Gls)
2025–	Hertha BSC II	22	(4)
2026–	Hertha BSC	10	(0)

International career^{‡}
2022	Estonia U17	6	(0)
2023	Estonia U19	3	(0)
2025–2026	Estonia U21	4	(0)
2026–	Germany U20	1	(0)
- * Club domestic league appearances and goals as of 14:52, 18 November 2026 (UTC) ‡ National team caps and goals as of 14:52, 18 November 2026 (UTC)

Soufian Gouram (born 1 May 2006) is a German professional footballer who plays as a midfielder for 2. Bundesliga club Hertha BSC.

== Early life ==
Gouram was born on 1 May 2006 in Berlin, Germany, to a Moroccan father and an Estonian mother.

== Club career ==
Gouram started his career with the reserve team of German side Hertha BSC. In 2026, he was promoted to the club's senior team.

== International career ==
Gouram was an Estonia youth international. During September 2025 and March 2026, he played for the Estonia under-21 team in the 2027 UEFA European Under-21 Championship qualification.

On 16 November 2026, Gouram made his debut for the Germany U20 national team in a 2–2 draw against the Czech Republic, coming on as a substitute in the 64th minute.
