= 2026 Baltic Cup =

International football competition

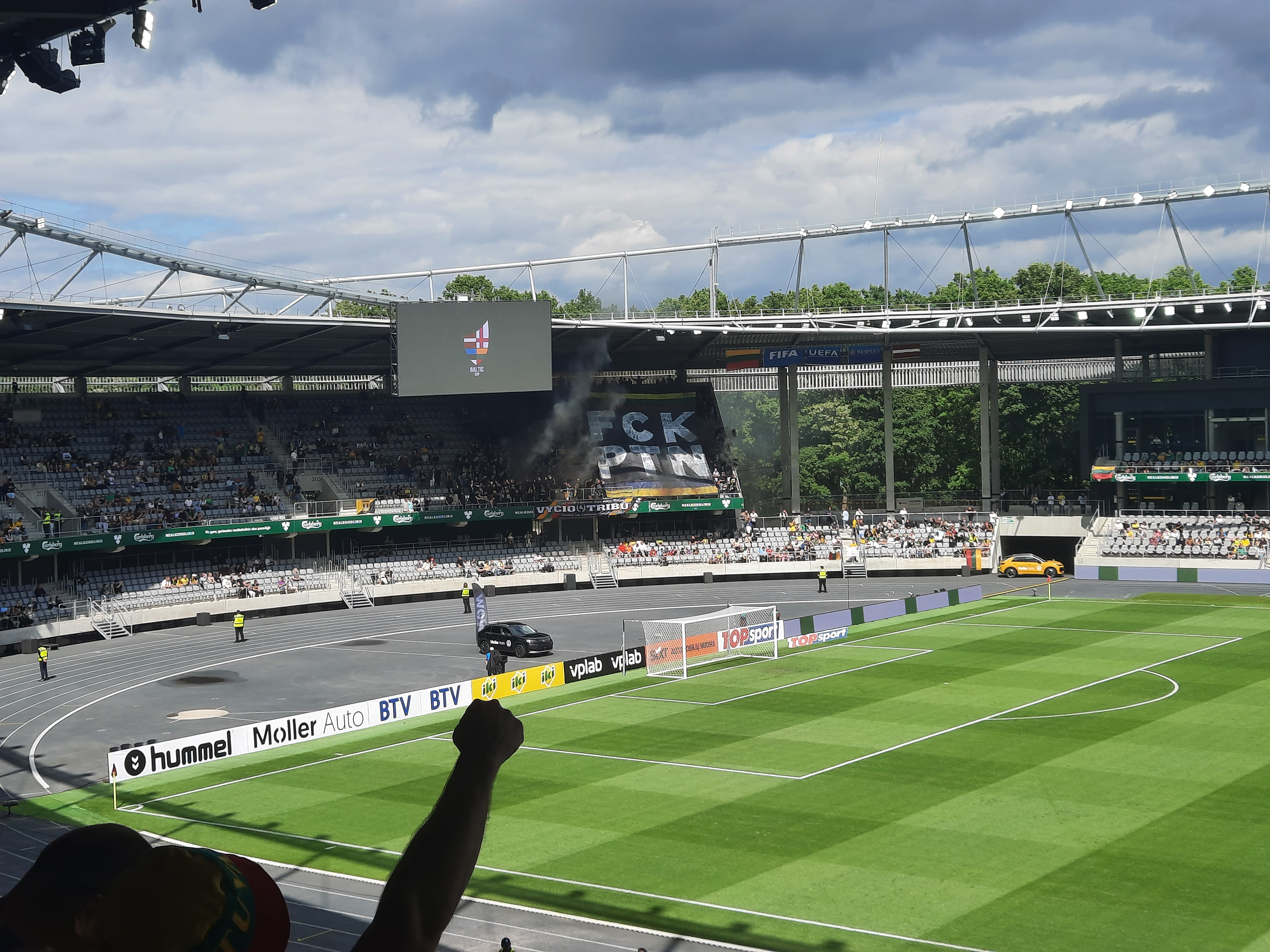
- Anti-Putin demonstration durin the opening match between Lithuania and Latvia

Tournament details
- Host country: Estonia; Latvia; Lithuania
- Dates: 6–9 June 2026
- Teams: 4
- Venues: 4 (in 4 host cities)

Final positions
- Champions: Estonia (6th title)
- Runners-up: Lithuania
- Third place: Faroe Islands
- Fourth place: Latvia

Tournament statistics
- Matches played: 4
- Goals scored: 5 (1.25 per match)
- Attendance: 13,669 (3,417 per match)

The 2026 Baltic Cup was the 31st Baltic Cup, an international football tournament contested by the Baltic states. Estonia were the defending champions, and they won their sixth Baltic Cup title overall.

== Format ==
This edition saw the previous knock-out tournament format first tried at 2012 Baltic Cup used. Penalty shoot-outs were used to decide the winner if a match was drawn after 90 minutes.

== Results ==
Semi-finals
6 June – Kaunas
Lithuania (p)	1 (5)
Latvia	1 (4)
6 June – Pärnu
Estonia	1
Faroe Islands	0

Final
9 June – Tallinn
Estonia	1
Lithuania	0
Third place
9 June – Riga
Latvia	0
Faroe Islands	1

== Matches ==
=== Semi-finals ===
6 June 2026
16:00

Lithuania	1–1	Latvia
Kučys 28'	Report	Toņiševs 60'
Penalties
Utkus (penalty scored); Gineitis (penalty scored); Kučys (penalty scored); Michelbrink (penalty missed); Novikovas (penalty scored); Burba (penalty scored)	5–4	(penalty scored) Regža; (penalty scored) Ķigurs; (penalty missed) Meļņiks; (penalty scored) Cigaņiks; (penalty scored) Saveļjevs; (penalty missed) Penkevics

Darius and Girėnas Stadium, Kaunas
Attendance: 7,789
Referee: Joonas Jaanovits (Estonia)
6 June 2026
18:00

Estonia	1–0	Faroe Islands
Varjund 66'	Report

Pärnu Rannastaadion, Pärnu
Attendance: 1,538
Referee: Kristaps Ratnieks (Latvia)

=== Match for third place ===
9 June 2026
18:00

Latvia	0–1	Faroe Islands
	Report	Sørensen 81'

LNK Sporta Parks, Riga
Attendance: 729
Referee: Dovydas Švėgžda (Lithuania)

=== Final ===
9 June 2026
19:00

Estonia	1–0	Lithuania
Mustmaa 80'	Report

A. Le Coq Arena, Tallinn
Attendance: 3,613
Referee: Vitālijs Spasjonņikovs (Latvia)
