= Estonia national football team =

Men's association football team

Estonia
- Nickname: Sinisärgid (Blueshirts) Kalevipojad
- Association: Eesti Jalgpalli Liit (EJL)
- Confederation: UEFA (Europe)
- Head coach: Jürgen Henn
- Captain: Karol Mets
- Most caps: Konstantin Vassiljev (159)
- Top scorer: Andres Oper (38)
- Home stadium: Lilleküla Stadium
- FIFA code: EST
First colours	Second colours

FIFA ranking
- Current: 117 ▲5 (18 November 2026)
- Highest: 47 (March 2012)
- Lowest: 137 (October 2008)

First international
- Finland 6–0 Estonia (Helsinki, Finland; 17 October 1920)

Biggest win
- Estonia 6–0 Lithuania (Tallinn, Estonia; 26 July 1928); Gibraltar 0–6 Estonia (Faro, Portugal; 7 October 2017)

Biggest defeat
- Finland 10–2 Estonia (Helsinki, Finland; 11 August 1922); Germany 8–0 Estonia (Mainz, Germany; 11 June 2019)

Baltic Cup
- Appearances: 28 (first in 1928)
- Best result: Champions (1929, 1931, 1938, 2020, 2024, 2026)
- Website: jalgpall.ee

The Estonia men's national football team (Note: Estonian: Eesti jalgpallikoondis) (Estonian: Eesti Jalgpallikoondis) represents Estonia in international football matches and is controlled by the Estonian Football Association, the governing body for football in Estonia. Estonia's home ground is Lilleküla Stadium in the capital city Tallinn.

The national team's first ever match was held against Finland in 1920 and resulted in 6–0 defeat. Estonian footballers have participated only once in the Olympic Games, when they played a single match in the 1924 Olympic Games' final tournament in Paris, France. They were defeated 1–0 by the United States in first round. During World War II, in 1940, Estonia was invaded and occupied by the Soviet Union, and there was no possibility of fielding a national football team again until the country restored full independence in August 1991. After the end of the 1944–1991 Soviet occupation, Estonia's first FIFA-recognised international match was with Slovenia on 3 June 1992, a 1–1 draw at home in Tallinn.

Estonia has never qualified for the FIFA World Cup or UEFA European Championship. The team has reached the UEFA Euro 2012 qualifying play-offs, by finishing second in their qualifying group, before being drawn up against Ireland for a play-off tie, making 2011 the "annus mirabilis of Estonian football". They have since repeated this feat by qualifying for the UEFA Euro 2024 qualifying play-offs through being the best group winner in 2022–23 UEFA Nations League D.

Estonia has also participated in the local sub-regional Baltic Cup championship, which takes place every two years between the countries of Estonia, Latvia and Lithuania. Estonia has won the three-nation Baltic Cup tournament five times — most recently in 2024 — which is less than either of the other two teams in the tournament, Latvia and Lithuania.

The record for the most international caps by an international is held by Konstantin Vassiljev with 159. Martin Reim has 157 caps, who held the European record in 2009 until November of that year. The record for most goals is held by Andres Oper with 38.

== History ==
=== The Republic of Estonia (1918–1940) ===
Estonians were introduced to the game of football by English sailors in the first years of the 20th century, when the land was still part of the Russian Empire. The national team was formed after the war of independence (1918–1920). It played its first match on 17 October 1920 in Helsinki, Finland which ended in a 6–0 defeat. The game took place on a grass surface, which was a first for the Estonians. The Estonian Football Association was founded on 14 December 1921 and affiliated with FIFA in 1923 joining Yugoslavia, Latvia, Poland, Czechoslovakia, Turkey and Uruguay.

Estonia's only participation in a major tournament took place at the 1924 Summer Olympics in Paris. Estonians lost their only match in the tournament to the United States 1–0.

The Estonian league season usually lasted from the end of May to September. In 1928 the first Baltic football contest was held involving all three nations, it was held nine times during this period. Four of them were held in Latvia, two in Estonia and three in Lithuania. Estonia was particularly notable for winning the edition of the tournament in 1938. In the crucial meeting between them and Latvia at the Kadrioru Stadium, 2,000 out of the 12,000 spectators were Latvians.

Estonia's first FIFA World Cup qualifying match took place on 11 June 1933 in Stockholm, Sweden, which ended with a Swedish 6–2 win. This match was also the world's first FIFA world cup qualifying match. Since later on Sweden also defeated Lithuania, the match between Estonia and Lithuania was cancelled, because Sweden had already won the group.

Estonia's first points in the FIFA World Cup qualifying rounds were gained in 1938, playing the qualification matches in 1937, the third edition of the tournament. At the time teams would play each other once in each group. Estonia were in group one, drawn with Germany, Sweden and Finland. In their first match against Sweden, the team went 2–0 up even before the game reached five minutes of play, only to lose 7–2. This was then followed up with a 1–0 success against Finland in which Richard Kuremaa scored the only goal of the game in the 56th minute. Qualification was completed with a 4–1 defeat against Germany, despite a goal from Georg Siimenson taking the teams in at half time with a 1–0 lead for the Estonians. As a result, Estonia failed to qualify for the World Cup.

The team's biggest win came on 26 July 1928 which was a 6–0 success against Lithuania in Tallinn, meanwhile their biggest defeat came on 11 August 1922 which was a 10–2 loss to Finland. Out of the team's head coaches before the Second World War, seven of them were Hungarian with Antal Mally taking this position twice. There were four foreign coaches (three Hungarians and one Austrian), while the first Estonian national team was coached by Albert Vollrat in 1932. Coaches also played for several seasons, who also determined the composition of the football association.

Players were mostly in Tallinn clubs, such as TJK, Sport, Kalev and Tallinn Estonia. The republic's most capped players were goalkeeper Evald Tipner (67) and the outfield players Eugen Einmann (65), Eduard Ellman-Eelma (58) and Karl-Rudolf Silberg-Sillak (52). Top goal scorers were Ellman-Eelma (21 goals in 65 matches), Richard Kuremaa (18/42), Arnold Pihlak (17/44), Georg Siimenson (14/42) and Friedrich Karm (9/13). Players received small pay for their contributions – 5 Estonian krooni in 1938. The Baltic tournament victory was 50 krooni.

On 18 July 1940 the team played their last official game as an independent nation for more than half a century. The game was played at the Kadrioru Stadium and was a 2–1 victory against Latvia.

=== World War II and Soviet occupation (1940–1991) ===
In 1940, the Stalinist Soviet Union invaded and occupied Estonia and, in August 1940, when Estonia was annexed into the USSR, the national team ceased to exist along with the independent country. During German occupation (1941–1944), the team was revived and they played two unofficial friendlies (in Riga 0–4 and in Tallinn 1–8), but only few players remained from the pre-war era. When Soviet troops invaded Estonia again in 1944, some of the best footballers (Richard Kuremaa, Elmar Tepp, Valter Neeris, etc.) were mobilised; some fled to west. Many ex-nationals (Arnold Pihlak, Arnold Laasner, etc.) were in Estonia's team in Geislingen's refugee camp.

The clubs were renamed in the second half of the 1940s and the traditions started to fade. According to Uno Piir, the first national team manager after Estonia restored independence in 1991, the reason for football's downfall in Soviet-occupied Estonia was the inability to create a club competitive at the level of the Soviet Union's top clubs, hence the decrease in audience and the favouring of other sports by the governing bodies of sports. Formally, the Estonian SSR had its own representative team, but because of the occupation it did not take part of international competitions. Between 1948 and 1976, the Baltic Cup was held 19 times, which The Byelorussian SSR won a few times and the Estonian SSR five times. From 1969 to 1982, Soviet-occupied Estonia was the only Soviet "union republic" not participating in the Soviet Union's football league. During the 1970s, the game lost popularity in Estonia and the sport was mainly played by the Russian immigrant community.

Estonian football-life was relaunched in mid-70s by the attempts of Roman Ubakivi, who formed Estonian-language training groups. The most notable team was Lõvid (English: Lions) in 1980–1989, who were coached by Ubakivi and Olev Reim. Several players, such as Mart Poom and Martin Reim, became part of the national team later. Not a single Estonian reached the Soviet national team, but two Ubakivi's pupils, Ott Mõtsnik and Toomas Krõm, broke into the youth team.

The Singing Revolution, the pursuit to restore Estonian independence and to cool regional tensions, found its way to football as well. On 18 July 1990, an exhibition match was held between Estonian and Latvian footballers at Kadriorg Stadium, to remember the last official match between the two teams as independent nations 50 years previously. The principle of assembling the squad was controversial. 63 players made a public addressing (Päevaleht, 24 April 1990) calling out the football governing bodies to only select the descendants of Estonians, leaving out immigrants who came to Estonia after World War II.

=== Return to international football (1991–1996) ===
Estonia restored its full independence on 20 August 1991, and returned to international football when the team debuted in the Baltic tournament which took place in Lithuania in November 1991. However, the first recognized match did not take place until June 1992 in Tallinn as a friendly against Slovenia (1–1). This historic meeting under the guidance of coach Uno Piir was overseen by a team consisting of Mart Poom, Urmas Hepner, Igor Prins, Urmas Kaljend, Meelis Lindmaa, Toomas Kallaste, Tarmo Linnumäe, Indro Olumets, Martin Reim, Sergei Ratnikov, Risto Kallaste, Viktor Alonen, Urmas Kirs, Marko Kristal and Aleksandr Puštov. Puštov was the scorer of the Estonian goal.

At that time the composition of the squad was influenced by the country's citizenship policy. There were disputes whether the national team should include players who lived in Estonia but had not acquired Estonian citizenship. Most of those players in question were of Russian origin. Approximately four months before the first official match against Slovenia, FC Flora presented the Estonian Football Association (EFA) an ultimatum signed by 25 players which stated that "only those who have acquired Estonian citizenship on the basis of legal continuity should be included in the national team". In July of the same year FIFA gave the right to represent Estonia to 97 non-citizens who were according to EFA born in Estonia and were in the process of acquiring Estonian citizenship. In October the board of EFA made a decision that after the date of 1 April 1993 non-citizens could no more debut in the national team.

The citizenship dispute heated up again in February 1993 when Estonia took part in a three team friendly tournament held in Finland. For the first time, non-citizen players Andrei Borissov and Sergei Bragin were allowed to represent Estonia in the national team. In a statement made on 23 February the government of Estonia urged the Estonian Central Sports Union to "consider manning Estonian sports teams only with Estonian citizens". On 11 March the local press published an open letter in which the signatories accused EFA and the head coach Uno Piir of using four "alien citizens" (Andrei Borissov, Sergei Bragin, Aleksandr Puštov, Sergei Hohlov-Simson) in games and using Russian as the working language of the national team. The signatories also noted that "most of the positions belonging to Estonians (in youth teams) were filled with non-citizens". According to Estonian press the EFA had also misled FIFA because most of those 97 players who had gotten the right to represent Estonia had not actually applied for citizenship.

On 5 December 1991 the EFA decided to take part in 1994 FIFA World Cup qualification tournament despite financial difficulties, the poor state of the Kadrioru Stadium and the inexperience of the national team. Estonia ended the qualification tournament in the last place of the group and with record of one goal scored and 27 conceded. The team lost nine games and drew once against Malta.

In the UEFA Euro 1996 qualifying tournament the team was coached by Roman Ubakivi. The qualification tournament ended without a single point and a goals record of three scored and 31 against. The biggest defeats came from abroad against Croatia (7–1) and Lithuania (5–0).

From 14 October 1993 to 5 October 1996 Estonia played without a victory for almost three years and by February 1996 the team had sunk to 135 in the FIFA World Rankings. Public interest was at a low. In the autumn of 1994 when Estonia hosted Italy at the Kadrioru Stadium only 3000 people came to watch.

=== First foreign coach and improved results (1996–2000) ===
Results improved with the arrival of the newly independent team's first foreign coach, Icelander Teitur Thordarson. His first victory was achieved at the fifth attempt in October 1996, when they defeated Belarus at the Kadriorg Stadium in a 1998 World Cup qualifier with a goal from Hohlov-Simson. After the victory over the Belarusians, the Estonian team gained infamy on 9 October 1996, when a match against Scotland had to be rescheduled after the Estonian team failed to turn up for the game. For unclear reasons, the match was rescheduled to be played on neutral ground in Monaco after it was agreed at a FIFA meeting in Scotland on 7 November, leading to the rescheduled match to take place on 11 February 1997 ending in a 0–0 draw. Reasons for the original postponement of the game was that the Scottish team trained at the Kadriorg the night before, finding the floodlighting inadequate. This matter was raised with the officials who agreed with their concerns. In protest, the Estonians failed to show up, which kicked off only to be stopped seconds later.

At the end of qualifying, the Estonians finished fifth in a field of six teams on a total of four points ahead of Belarus. This was the first time the Belarusians finished last in a qualifying campaign, and had a weaker goal difference. Estonia scored four goals and conceded sixteen.

Estonia also entered the qualifying tournament for Euro 2000. This time round the Estonians recorded three wins and two draws in their group, with fifteen goals scored and seventeen conceded. The team also found themselves in the same group as Scotland, this time losing 3–2 away but drawing 0–0 at home. The Estonian magazine Sporditäht, placed the 1998 events between the pair in their top ten sporting events. On 31 March 1999 the Estonians defeated Lithuania 2–1 in Vilnius. Estonia remained a theoretical possibility to qualify for their first major tournament. Despite failing to qualify, they still set themselves a then team record of 11 points. Their meeting with Scotland on 8 September 1999 was a 5,000 sell-out at the Kadriorg.

=== A new stadium and the "Dutch period" (2000–2007) ===
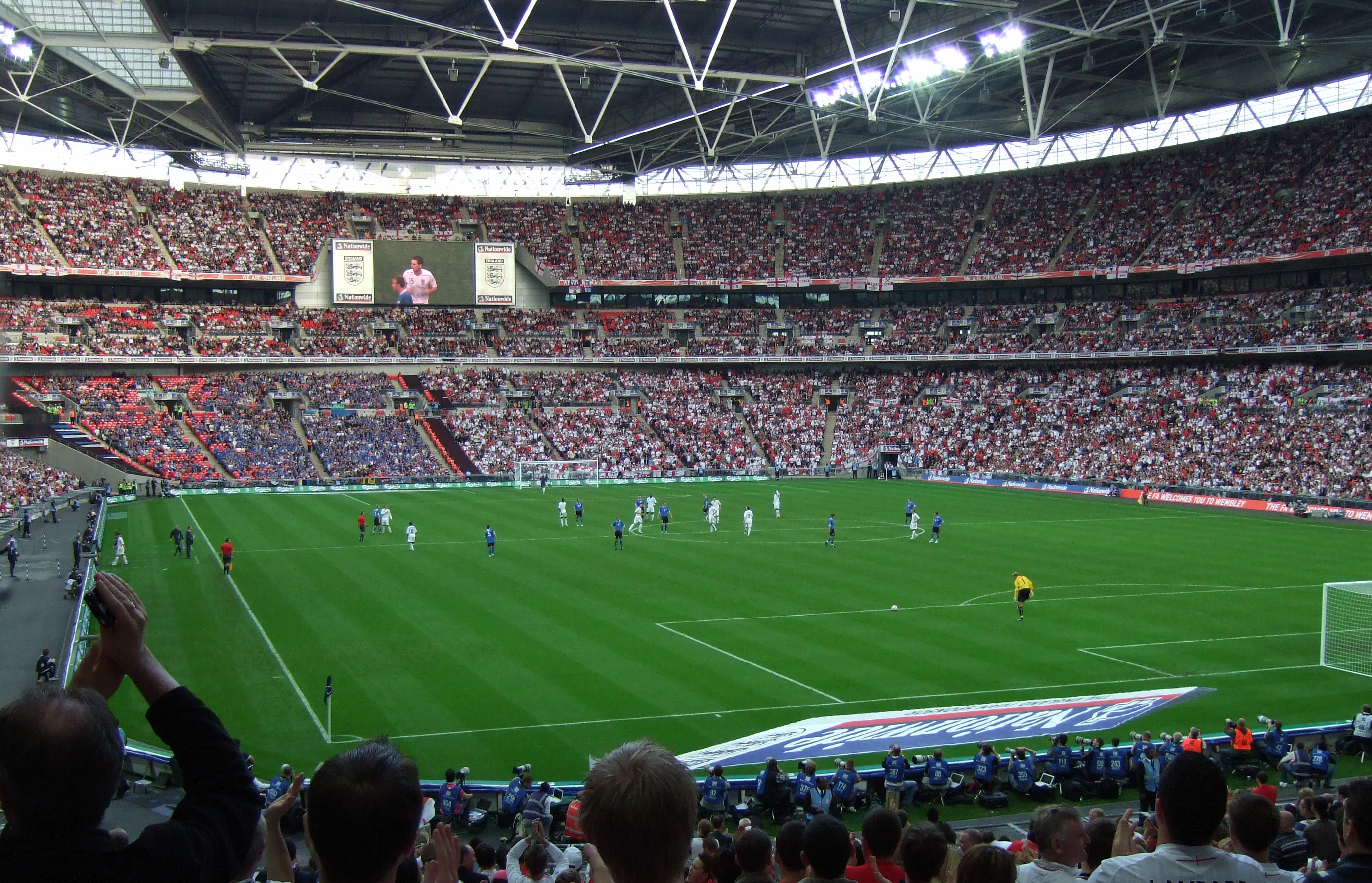
Estonia's national team has had four meetings with England, with the last to date being at Wembley Stadium on 9 October 2015.

Head coach Teitur Thordarson resigned at the end of 1999, leading the Estonian football association to look for a new coach. They were taken over this time by Tarmo Rüütli (who was replaced by caretaker Aivar Lillevere for two games), who was appointed until autumn 2000, and seen the team through their qualifying group for the 2002 FIFA World Cup. After the departure of Rüütli and Lillevere's two game stint as caretaker manager, the Estonian Football Association made an agreement with Dutchman Arno Pijpers.

Plans were later set by the football association to build a modern football home in Tallinn, which took place in 2000 and construction began outside of the Lilleküla railway line, giving it its original name of the Lilleküla Stadium. The arena opened on 2 June 2001, ahead of their 2002 World Cup qualifying game against the Netherlands (4–2 defeat). The 9,300 tickets on sale for the match sold out within six hours.

Their campaign for 2002 FIFA World Cup qualification, saw two victories over Andorra and two draws with Cyprus, which gave the team a total of eight points in the final table and fourth place with ten goals scored and 26 against, finishing ahead of those two teams. This was later matched in UEFA Euro 2004 qualifying, where they gained two more wins over Andorra and draws with Croatia and Bulgaria. The team's goals record was much more stronger defensively, only conceding six goals in their eight matches while scoring four.

Estonia then most successful tournament came in the qualifying rounds for the 2006 FIFA World Cup, under the supervision of Dutchman and assistant coach of Pijpers Jelle Goes, after Pijpers left the post in 2004. Five wins, two draws and five losses gave them 17 points in their qualification group and fourth place. The team were placed ahead of Latvia, Liechtenstein and Luxembourg. UEFA Euro 2008 qualifying was not as successful, which seen the team finish sixth in a field of seven teams, only ahead of Andorra who were also the only team they recorded wins against and gained a total of seven points. The Estonian FA shortly parted company with Goes in June 2007.

=== Rüütli's head coach again and the anniversary year (2008–present) ===
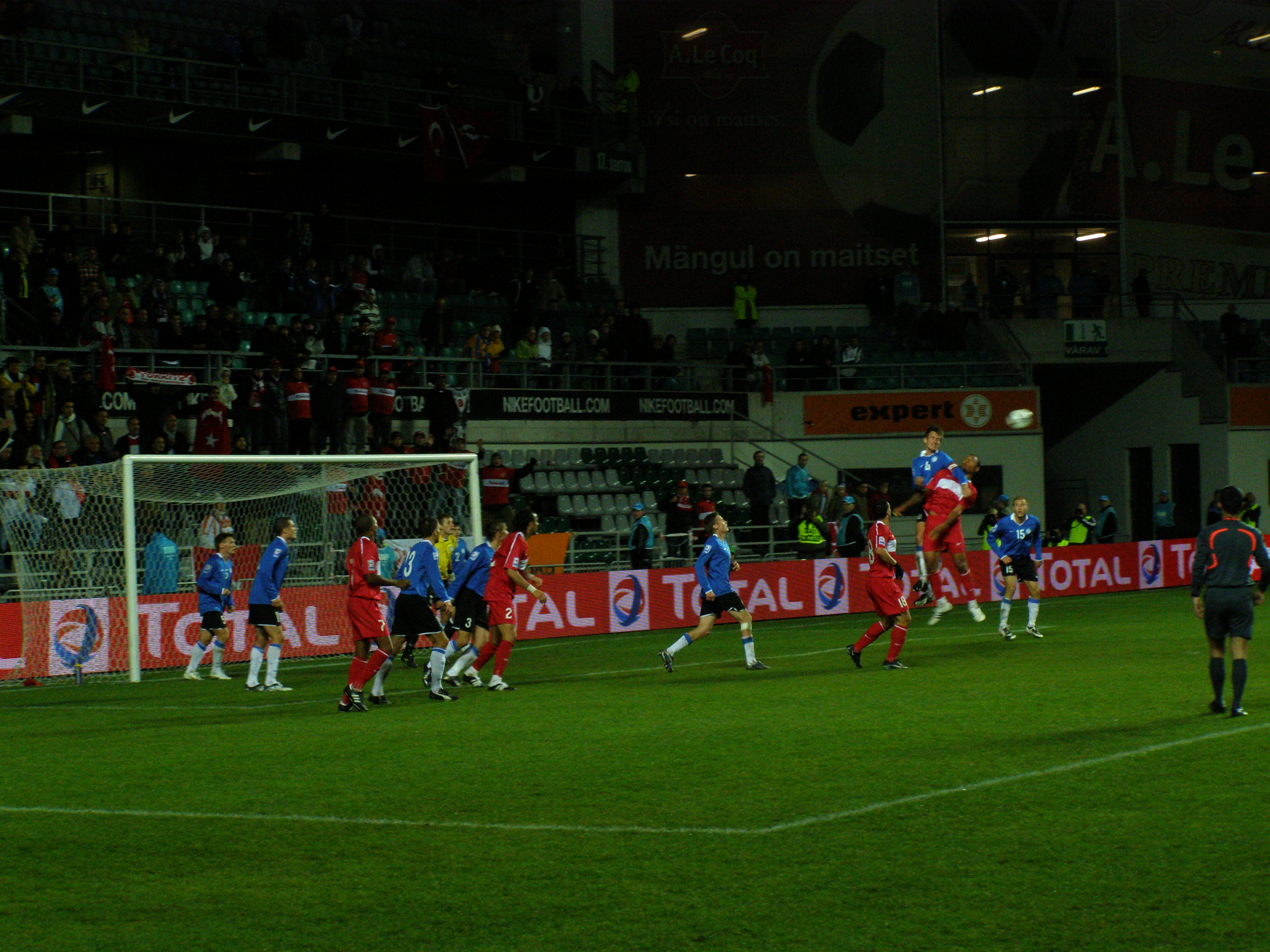
Estonia vs Turkey at the Lilleküla Stadium. 0–0 draw, 15 October 2008.

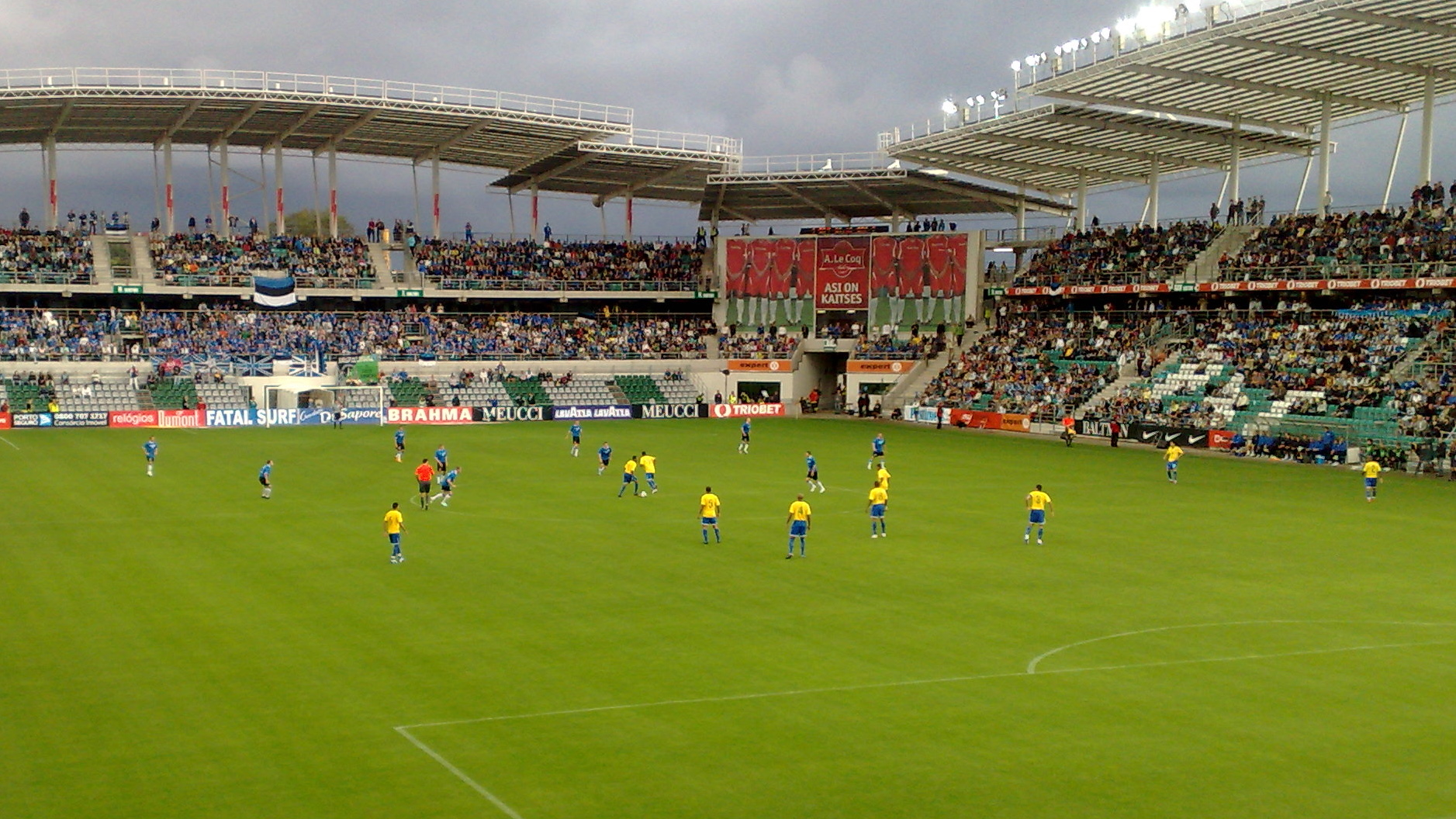
Estonia – Brazil at the Lilleküla Stadium. 1–0 win for Brazil, 12 August 2009.

November 2007 saw the approval of a two-year contract for new head coach Tarmo Rüütli, who had overseen the national team in the 1999–2000 season, with this being the last time the team took on an Estonian coach, as Pijpers was the first of three foreign coaches between 2000 and 2007. Rüütli's main task in his second term was to lead the team through the 2010 World Cup qualifying matches. The team showed volatile form in friendly matches during 2008. In September, the Estonians lost 3–2 to Belgium in an away qualifying match, but fell to a low ebb after being beaten 7–0 by Bosnia also on their travels, and fell to an all-time low of 137th place in the FIFA World Rankings. The first home game of the campaign was a 3–0 loss to Spain, the reigning European champions. The team still picked up points during the qualification, which included holding Euro 2008 semi-finalists Turkey to a 0–0 draw. Further results were a 1–0 win over Armenia, and a 2–2 draw away from home before the campaign was completed with a 2–0 win against the Belgians. The team collected 8 points finishing fifth in a group of six.

2009 was declared the 100th anniversary of Estonian football. The final matches for record cap holder Martin Reim (6 June versus Equatorial Guinea) and long-standing goalkeeper Mart Poom were held (against Portugal on 10 June). Sajandi mäng (English: Match of the Century) was the first ever match versus Brazil, who had arrived in Tallinn as the FIFA World Rankings leaders, and also the five-time world champions, winning 1–0. Much attention was attracted the day after the international friendly, with the Estonian FA announcing that coach Rüütli's contract was to be extended to 2011.

Estonia later achieved one of its most famous victories, winning 3–1 in a 2012 European Championship away qualifier on 8 October 2010 against Serbia then ranked 15th in the FIFA rankings. The match took place four months after the Serbian team had competed in the World Cup.

Media attention came from a 2–2 friendly international result with Bulgaria. Two days before the friendly match, on 11 February 2011, bets were placed by officials regarding the outcome of the match. Suspicion of match manipulation was raised when a Hungarian referee gave four disputable penalties, being equally distributed between the two sides. The same team of officials also took charge of the game the day before, an international friendly involving Latvia and Bolivia which ended 2–1 in favour of the Latvians and had also seen three penalties awarded in the game, which were also all of the goals scored.

The Estonian team got an important victory in their next match, which was on 25 March at the Lilleküla Stadium over Uruguay in a friendly match. Former World Cup winners Uruguay had recently reached the semi-finals of the 2010 World Cup and were sitting at 7th place in the FIFA rankings at the time of the 2–0 victory. The captain Raio Piiroja earned his 100th international cap. On 29 March, the good performances continued with a 1–1 home draw against Serbia.

This was followed by a period of poor form, which began with an unofficial friendly game loss to the Basque Country, qualifying defeats to Italy and the Faroe Islands then followed, before a tour of South America saw the team lose to Chile and Uruguay. A 3–0 loss to Turkey in Istanbul then completed their friendly matches cycle before qualifying resumed. However, the Sinisärgid won away from home to Slovenia and at home to Northern Ireland, which lifted the team to 58th in the FIFA rankings, giving them their best position to date. This win completed their group matches in the Euro 2012 qualifying campaign.

The regular qualification phase for the Euro 2012 tournament was completed with a win in the final game away to Northern Ireland. Four days later, Serbia failed to beat Slovenia, thus Estonia entered a qualifying play-off against the Republic of Ireland with the first leg in Tallinn. Estonia lost the home game 0–4 but managed a 1–1 draw abroad. The Euro 2012 qualifying campaign was Estonia's best to date, with 16 points achieved out of a possible 30, and was the closest that Estonia came to qualifying for a major tournament.

On 5 June 2012, Estonia set a record for being the first team to have played all of UEFA fellow 52 members. Two more sides have been added since 2013 as full UEFA members. Estonia has played the 53rd member, Gibraltar, but has not yet taken on the newest member, Kosovo.

On 15 November 2014, Estonia became the first and so far only team to give up a point to San Marino in the European Championship qualifying tournament, when the two sides played to a 0–0 draw in San Marino.

On Tuesday, 28 March 2017, Estonia gained one of the most famous wins in their history as they beat Croatia 3–0 at home in an international friendly.

On 19 November 2018, Estonia defeated Greece 1–0 in Athens.

On 10 June 2021, Estonia won the Baltic Cup for the 4th time, beating Latvia 2–1 at home, and it's the first time after 83 years, since 1938.

== Home stadium ==
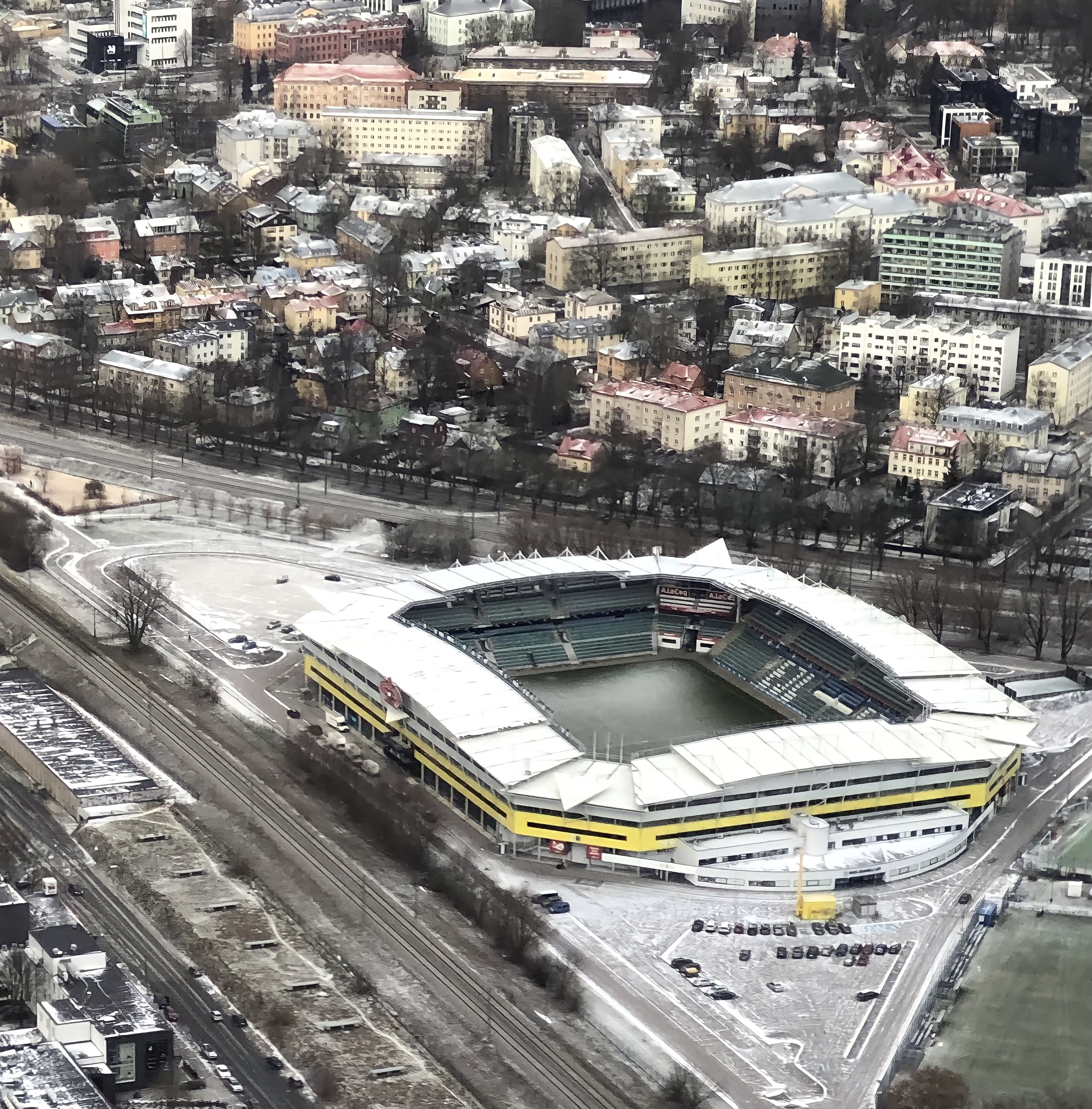
Lilleküla Stadium, commonly known as A. Le Coq Arena, has been the national stadium of Estonia since 2001.

Home games are played in Tallinn at the Lilleküla Stadium since 2001, its capacity is about 14,400. The stadium borrows its name from its sponsor A. Le Coq, a major Estonian brewery. The stadium was opened on 2 June 2001, for the sold-out World Cup qualifier versus the Netherlands. This is also Estonia's largest football stadium. Lilleküla Stadium is also the home of FC Flora.

Their previous home ground was the Kadriorg Stadium, which opened in June 1926 with a 3–1 victory over Lithuania. The Kadriorg holds 5,000 seats and in contrast to the Lilleküla Stadium, stages athletics events on a regular basis.

List of Estonia's home grounds through history:
Stadium	Location	Years
Tiigiveski Ground	Tallinn	1921
Kalevi Aed	Tallinn	1923–1925
Kadriorg Stadium	Tallinn	1926–1940 1992–2000
Lilleküla Stadium	Tallinn	2001–present

Estonia have also staged friendly matches away from Tallinn in Kohtla-Järve, Kuressaare, Narva, Pärnu, Rakvere, Tartu, Valga and Viljandi.

== Team image ==
=== Kit ===
The kit of the Estonian national team (home games) traditionally consists of a blue shirt, black shorts and white socks, while a change strip (away games), is that of a white shirt, black shorts and blue socks. Before 1996, other colour combinations have been used. The goalkeeper usually wears a yellow jersey, black shorts and yellow socks. The kit design changes every two years to a new one. Since 1997 the team's supplier has been Nike, while between 1992 and 1997 it was supplied by Lotto. Below is a timeline of how the home kit colours have changed through time:

1922	1924	1992–present

=== Supporters ===
Estonia's main supporters group of that of the Jalgpallihaigla (English: Football Hospital), with over 600 members. The group is committed to "Deal with all of your supporters issues from ticket distribution in a special fans section, and also with the fans as watchdogs for relations with the Estonian Football Association and their clubs". Home games see the group as the most vocal, situated in the Southern section of the Lilleküla Stadium.

A busy away journey took place in October 2007, when at Wembley Stadium for the European championship qualifier with England a crowd of two thousand Estonian fans were in attendance.

A large number of away fans have visited Tallinn. In 2009 1,700 supporters of Bosnia and Herzegovina were at the Lilleküla Stadium.

== Results and fixtures ==
The following is a list of match results in the last 12 months, as well as any future matches that have been scheduled.

Win Draw Loss Fixture

=== 2026 ===
27 March 2026 2026 FIFA Series	Kenya	1–1 (4–5 p)	Estonia	Kigali, Rwanda
18:00 (UTC+2)	Ogam 51'	Report	Tammik 21'	Stadium: Amahoro Stadium; Referee: Georges Gatogato (Burundi)
	Penalties
	A. Odhiambo (penalty scored); Bajaber (penalty missed); Ouma (penalty scored); Erambo (penalty scored); Omondi (penalty scored); Odada (penalty missed)		(penalty scored) Tõugjas; (penalty missed) Yakovlev; (penalty scored) Schjønning-Larsen; (penalty scored) Tamm; (penalty scored) Sappinen; (penalty scored) Soomets

30 March 2026 2026 FIFA Series	Rwanda	2–0	Estonia	Kigali, Rwanda
19:30 (UTC+2)	Biramahire 30'; L. Mickels 51'	Report		Stadium: Amahoro Stadium; Referee: Ahmed Hassan Hussein (Somalia)

6 June 2026 2026 Baltic Cup	Estonia	1–0	Faroe Islands	Pärnu, Estonia
18:00 (UTC+3)	Varjund 66'	Report		Stadium: Pärnu Rannastaadion; Attendance: 1,543; Referee: Kristaps Ratnieks (Latvia)

9 June 2026 2026 Baltic Cup	Estonia	1–0	Lithuania	Tallinn, Estonia
19:00 (UTC+3)	Mustmaa 80'	Report		Stadium: A. Le Coq Arena; Attendance: 3,613; Referee: Vitālijs Spasjonņikovs (Latvia)

26 September 2026 2026–27 UEFA Nations League C	Iceland	1–1	Estonia	Reykjavik, Iceland
16:00 (UTC±0)	Guðjohnsen 45'	Report	Paskotši 64'	Stadium: Laugardalsvöllur; Attendance: 5,300; Referee: Miloš Milanović (Serbia)

29 September 2026 2026–27 UEFA Nations League C	Bulgaria	0–0	Estonia	Plovdiv, Bulgaria
21:45 (UTC+3)		Report		Stadium: Hristo Botev Stadium; Attendance: 960; Referee: Goga Kikacheishvili (Georgia)

3 October 2026 2026–27 UEFA Nations League C	Estonia	1–0	Luxembourg	Tallinn, Estonia
19:00 (UTC+3)	Peetson 5'	Report		Stadium: A. Le Coq Arena; Attendance: 7,211; Referee: Paweł Raczkowski (Poland)

6 October 2026 2026–27 UEFA Nations League C	Estonia	0–0	Iceland	Tallinn, Estonia
21:45 (UTC+3)		Report		Stadium: A. Le Coq Arena; Attendance: 5,987; Referee: David Dickinson (Scotland)

13 November 2026 2026–27 UEFA Nations League C	Luxembourg	0–1	Estonia	Luxembourg City, Luxembourg
20:45 (UTC+1)		Report	Paskotši 42'	Stadium: Stade de Luxembourg; Attendance: 9,214; Referee: Ishmael Barbara (Malta)

16 November 2026 2026–27 UEFA Nations League C	Estonia	2–1	Bulgaria	Tallinn, Estonia
19:00 (UTC+2)	Kristal 8'; Palumets 60'	Report	Kovachev 45+1'	Stadium: A. Le Coq Arena; Attendance: 8,006; Referee: Nenad Minaković (Serbia)

== Coaching staff ==
Position	Name
Head coach	(Estonia) Jürgen Henn
Assistant coach	(Estonia) Joel Indermitte
Assistant coach	(Netherlands) Arno Pijpers
Goalkeeping coach	(Estonia) Mart Poom
Fitness coach	(Estonia) Ilo Rihvk
Video analyst	(Estonia) Ants Jaakson
Doctor	(Estonia) Kaspar Rõivassepp
Physiotherapist	(Estonia) Marius Unt
Physiotherapist	(Estonia) Helvis Trääder
Physiotherapist	(Estonia) Priit Lehismets
Manager	(Estonia) Miko Pupart

== Players ==
=== Current squad ===
The following 25 players were named in the squad for the 2026–27 UEFA Nations League matches against Luxembourg and Bulgaria on 13 and 16 November 2026 respectively.

Caps and goals updated as of 16 November 2026, after the match against Bulgaria.

No.	Pos.	Player	Date of birth (age)	Caps	Goals	Club
1	GK	Karl Jakob Hein	13 April 2002 (age 24)	51	0	(German Football Association) Werder Bremen
12	GK	Matvei Igonen	2 October 1996 (age 30)	19	0	(Swedish Football Association) Degerfors IF
22	GK	Karl Andre Vallner	28 February 1998 (age 28)	5	0	(Estonian Football Association) FCI Levadia
2	DF	Mihhail Kolobov	2 March 2005 (age 21)	2	0	(Estonian Football Association) Flora
3	DF	Maksim Paskotši	19 January 2003 (age 23)	46	3	(Royal Belgian Football Association) Gent
6	DF	Rasmus Peetson	3 May 1995 (age 31)	31	3	(Estonian Football Association) FCI Levadia
13	DF	Joseph Saliste	10 April 1995 (age 31)	12	0	(Estonian Football Association) FCI Levadia
16	DF	Erko Jonne Tõugjas	5 July 2003 (age 23)	13	0	(Swedish Football Association) Halmstad
17	DF	Tanel Tammik	14 June 2002 (age 24)	2	1	(Estonian Football Association) FCI Levadia
18	DF	Karol Mets (captain)	16 May 1993 (age 33)	109	0	(German Football Association) VfL Bochum
19	DF	Michael Schjønning-Larsen	2 February 2001 (age 25)	26	0	(Scottish Football Association) Kilmarnock
23	DF	Frank Liivak	7 July 1996 (age 30)	29	3	(Estonian Football Association) FCI Levadia
	DF	Nikita Mihhailov	20 June 2002 (age 24)	1	0	(Slovak Football Association) Zemplín Michalovce
4	MF	Mattias Käit	29 June 1998 (age 28)	72	11	(Swiss Football Association) Thun
5	MF	Rocco Robert Shein	14 July 2003 (age 23)	27	1	(The Football Association) Portsmouth
10	MF	Kevor Palumets	21 November 2002 (age 23)	27	2	(Slovak Football Association) Košice
11	MF	Mihkel Ainsalu	8 March 1996 (age 30)	26	0	(Estonian Football Association) FCI Levadia
14	MF	Patrik Kristal	12 November 2007 (age 19)	20	1	(Swiss Football Association) Thun
15	MF	Maksimilian Skvortsov	20 December 2007 (age 18)	1	0	(Estonian Football Association) FCI Levadia
20	MF	Markus Poom	27 February 1999 (age 27)	40	0	(Slovak Football Association) Trenčín
21	MF	Vladislav Kreida	25 September 1999 (age 27)	25	0	(Estonian Football Association) Flora
	MF	Martin Miller	25 September 1997 (age 29)	41	2	(Estonian Football Association) Paide Linnameeskond
7	FW	Mattias Männilaan	8 September 2001 (age 25)	8	0	(Estonian Football Association) Nõmme Kalju
8	FW	Marten-Chris Paalberg	8 October 2008 (age 18)	5	0	(French Football Federation) Saint-Étienne
9	FW	Karel Mustmaa	8 August 2005 (age 21)	11	1	(Football Association of Serbia) Čukarički

=== Recent call-ups ===
The following players have been called up to the squad within the last twelve months.

Pos.	Player	Date of birth (age)	Caps	Goals	Club	Latest call-up
GK	Evert Grünvald	6 April 2001 (age 25)	0	0	(Estonia) Flora	v. Iceland, 6 October 2026
GK	Kaur Kivila	22 November 2003 (age 22)	1	0	(Estonia) Flora	2026 Baltic Cup
GK	Henri Perk	14 October 1999 (age 27)	0	0	(Estonia) Nõmme Kalju	2026 Baltic Cup
DF	Joonas Tamm	2 February 1992 (age 34)	68	4	(Romania) Sepsi OSK	v. Iceland, 6 October 2026
DF	Märten Kuusk	5 April 1996 (age 30)	47	0	(Poland) Polonia Warsaw	v. Iceland, 6 October 2026
DF	Robi Saarma	20 May 2001 (age 25)	18	1	(Czech Republic) Pardubice	v. Iceland, 6 October 2026
DF	Sander Alamaa	9 February 2008 (age 18)	0	0	(Estonia) Flora	v. Iceland, 6 October 2026
DF	Vlasiy Sinyavskiy	27 November 1996 (age 29)	50	1	(Czech Republic) Baník Ostrava	2026 Baltic Cup
DF	Ioan Yakovlev	19 January 1998 (age 28)	14	1	(Greece) Panionios	2026 Baltic Cup
DF	Kristo Hussar	28 June 2002 (age 24)	8	0	(Slovakia) Trenčín	2026 Baltic Cup
DF	Kristofer Käit	4 April 2005 (age 21)	1	0	(Estonia) Paide Linnameeskond	2026 Baltic Cup
DF	Sander Tovstik	26 March 2006 (age 20)	1	0	(Estonia) Flora	v. Rwanda, 30 March 2026
DF	Robert Veering	1 December 2005 (age 20)	1	0	(Estonia) Flora	v. Rwanda, 30 March 2026
MF	Markus Soomets	2 March 2000 (age 26)	27	0	(Denmark) Kolding IF	v. Iceland, 6 October 2026
MF	Soufian Gouram	1 May 2006 (age 20)	0	0	(Germany) Hertha BSC	2026 Baltic Cup ^{INJ}
MF	Rommi Siht	30 June 2006 (age 20)	1	0	(Estonia) Nõmme Kalju	v. Rwanda, 30 March 2026
MF	Martin Vetkal	21 February 2004 (age 22)	15	1	(Netherlands) FC Dordrecht	v. Kenya, 27 March 2026 ^{INJ}
FW	Alex Matthias Tamm	24 July 2001 (age 25)	21	2	(Slovenia) Olimpija Ljubljana	v. Iceland, 6 October 2026
FW	Henri Anier	17 December 1990 (age 35)	104	23	(Estonia) Paide Linnameeskond	v. Iceland, 26 September 2026 ^{INJ}
FW	Tony Varjund	21 June 2007 (age 19)	2	1	(Estonia) Flora	2026 Baltic Cup
FW	Rauno Sappinen	23 January 1996 (age 30)	65	17	(Cyprus) Olympiakos Nicosia	2026 Baltic Cup ^{INJ}
FW	Mark Anders Lepik	10 September 2000 (age 26)	11	1	(Estonia) Vaprus	2026 Baltic Cup ^{INJ}
^{INJ} Withdrew due to injury^{PRE} Preliminary squad / standby^{RET} Retired from the national team^{SUS} Serving suspension^{WD} Player withdrew from the squad due to non-injury issue.

== Player records ==
As of 16 November 2026.

Players in bold are still active with Estonia.

=== Most appearances ===
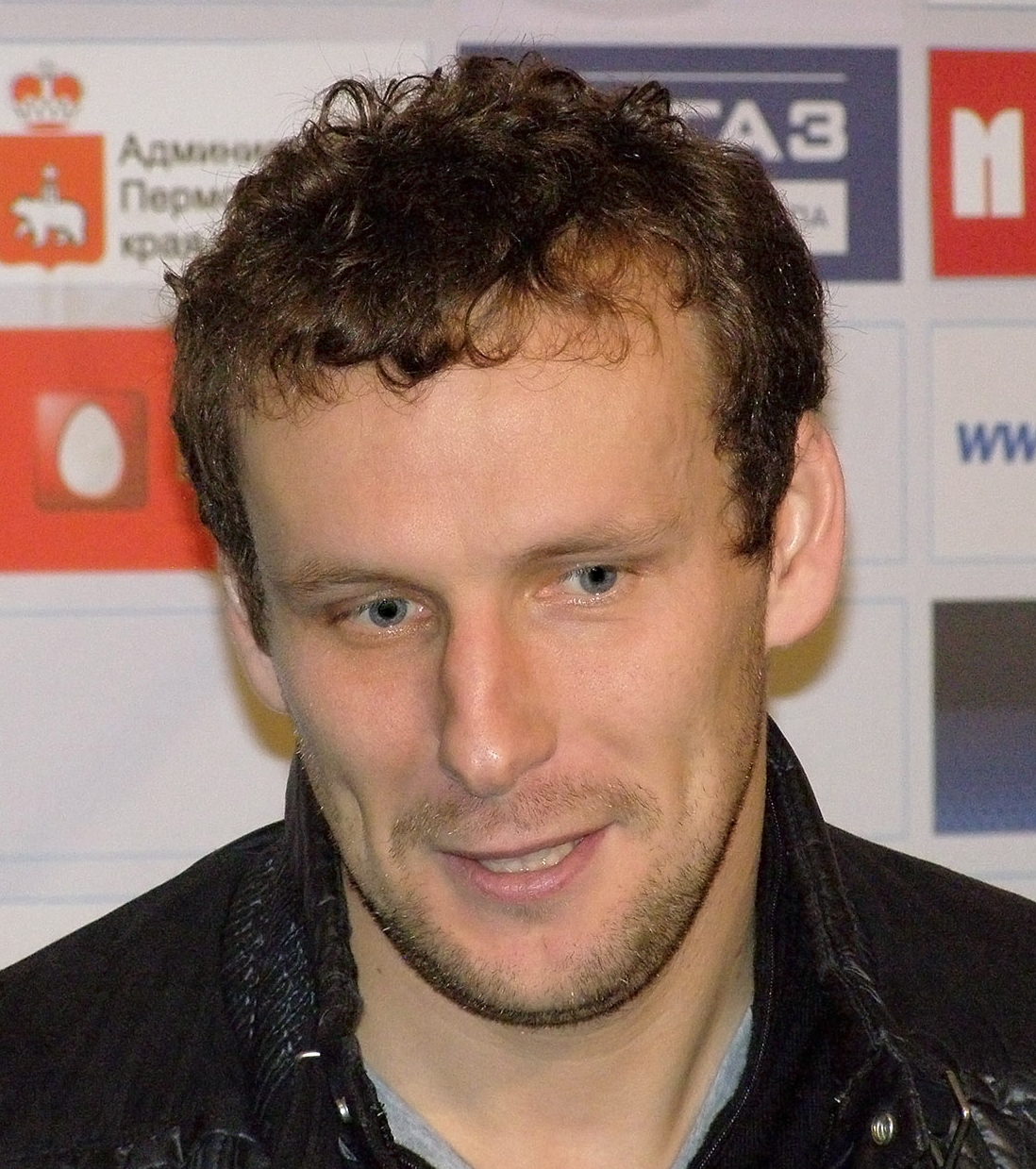
Konstantin Vassiljev is Estonia's most capped player with 159 appearances.

Rank	Player	Caps	Goals	Period
1	Konstantin Vassiljev	159	26	2006–2025
2	Martin Reim	157	14	1992–2009
3	Marko Kristal	143	9	1992–2005
4	Andres Oper	134	38	1995–2014
5	Ragnar Klavan	130	3	2003–2024
6	Enar Jääger	126	0	2002–2017
7	Mart Poom	120	0	1992–2009
8	Dmitri Kruglov	115	4	2004–2019
8	Kristen Viikmäe	115	15	1997–2013
10	Raio Piiroja	114	8	1998–2015
10	**Sergei Zenjov**	114	17	2008–present

=== Top goalscorers ===
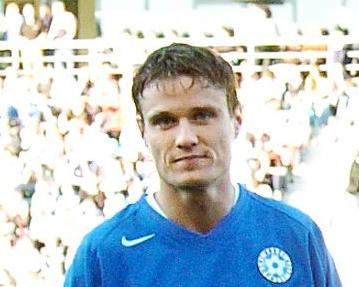
Andres Oper is Estonia's top goalscorer with 38 goals.

Rank	Player	Goals	Caps	Average	Period
1	Andres Oper	38	134	0.28	1995–2014
2	Indrek Zelinski	27	103	0.26	1994–2010
3	Konstantin Vassiljev	26	159	0.16	2006–2025
4	**Henri Anier**	23	104	0.22	2011–present
5	Eduard Ellmann-Eelma	21	60	0.35	1921–1935
6	Richard Kuremaa	19	42	0.45	1933–1940
7	**Rauno Sappinen**	17	65	0.26	2015–present
7	**Sergei Zenjov**	17	114	0.15	2008–present
9	Arnold Pihlak	16	44	0.36	1920–1931
10	Kristen Viikmäe	15	115	0.13	1997–2013

== Competition records ==
=== FIFA World Cup ===
FIFA World Cup record									Qualification record					
Year	Round	Position	Pld	W	D	L	GF	GA	Pld	W	D	L	GF	GA
(Uruguay) 1930	Did not enter								Did not enter					
(Italy) 1934	Did not qualify								1	0	0	1	2	6
(France) 1938	Did not qualify								3	1	0	2	4	11
(Brazil) 1950 to (Italy) 1990	Part of Soviet Union								Part of (Soviet Union) Soviet Union					
(United States) 1994	Did not qualify								10	0	1	9	1	27
(France) 1998	Did not qualify								10	1	1	8	4	16
(South Korea) (Japan) 2002	Did not qualify								10	2	2	6	10	26
(Germany) 2006	Did not qualify								12	5	2	5	16	17
(South Africa) 2010	Did not qualify								10	2	2	6	9	24
(Brazil) 2014	Did not qualify								10	2	1	7	6	20
(Russia) 2018	Did not qualify								10	3	2	5	13	19
(Qatar) 2022	Did not qualify								8	1	1	6	9	21
(Canada) (United States) (Mexico) 2026	Did not qualify								8	1	1	6	8	21
(Morocco) (Portugal) (Spain) 2030	To be determined								To be determined					
(Saudi Arabia) 2034	To be determined								To be determined					
Total		0/11	0	0	0	0	0	0	92	18	13	61	82	208

Draws include knockout matches decided via penalty shoot-out.

=== UEFA European Championship ===
UEFA European Championship record									Qualification record					
Year	Round	Position	Pld	W	D	L	GF	GA	Pld	W	D	L	GF	GA
(France) 1960 to (West Germany) 1988	Part of Soviet Union								Part of (Soviet Union) Soviet Union					
(Sweden) 1992	Did not enter								Did not enter					
(England) 1996	Did not qualify								10	0	0	10	3	31
(Belgium) (Netherlands) 2000	Did not qualify								10	3	2	5	15	17
(Portugal) 2004	Did not qualify								8	2	2	4	4	6
(Austria) (Switzerland) 2008	Did not qualify								12	2	1	9	5	21
(Poland) (Ukraine) 2012	Did not qualify								12	5	2	5	16	19
(France) 2016	Did not qualify								10	3	1	6	4	9
(Europe) 2020	Did not qualify								8	0	1	7	2	26
(Germany) 2024	Did not qualify								9	0	1	8	3	27
(England) (Scotland) (Republic of Ireland) (Wales) 2028	To be determined								To be determined					
(Italy) (Turkey) 2032	To be determined								To be determined					
Total		0/17	0	0	0	0	0	0	79	15	10	54	52	156

Draws include knockout matches decided via penalty shoot-out.

=== UEFA Nations League ===
UEFA Nations League record
Season	League	Group	Pos	Pld	W	D	L	GF	GA	P/R	RK
2018–19	C	2	4th	6	1	1	4	4	8	Same position	37th
2020–21	C	2	4th	8	0	4	4	5	11	▼	47th
2022–23	D	2	1st	4	4	0	0	10	2	▲	49th
2024–25	C	1	3rd	6	1	1	4	3	9	Same position	44th
2026–27	C	4	2nd	6	3	3	0	5	2	TBD	37th
2026–27	C	Promotion play-off	TBD	0	0	0	0	0	0	TBD	37th
Total			5/5	30	9	9	12	27	32	37th	

=== Olympic Games ===
Estonia national team at the 1924 Summer Olympics

Estonia's only participation in a major tournament was at the 1924 Summer Olympics in Paris, France. Coached by Hungarian Ferenc Kónya, Estonia's participation was limited to a single match in the first round as the team lost 0–1 to the United States, with Andy Straden scoring the winning goal from the penalty spot in the 15th minute. Estonia were also given a penalty and a chance to equalise, but Elmar Kaljot's effort struck the crossbar in the 68th minute. After going out of the tournament, the Estonian team stayed on in Paris for three weeks, playing a friendly match against Ireland, which ended in a 1–3 defeat, and then went to Germany, playing friendly matches against various teams including a 2–2 draw against 1. FC Kaiserslautern.

=== Milestones ===
- First World Cup qualification game: 11 June 1933, Stockholm, Sweden (6–2 loss) (first FIFA World Cup qualification match in history);
- First World Cup victory and also first away win: 19 August 1937, Turku, Finland (1–0);
- First European Championship qualifying game: 4 September 1994, Tallinn, Croatia (2–0 loss);
- First World Cup victory since return to independence: 5 October 1996, Tallinn, Belarus (1–0);
- First European Championship victory: 4 June 1998, Tallinn, Faroe Islands (5–0);
- First away win in the European Championship: 31 March 1999, Vilnius, Lithuania (2–1).

== Honours ==
=== Regional ===
- Baltic Cup
  - Champions (6): 1929, 1931, 1938, 2020, 2024, 2026
  - Runners-up (6): 1928, 1936, 1937, 1993, 1996, 2018
  - Third place (16): 1930, 1932, 1935, 1991, 1992, 1994, 1995, 1997, 1998, 2001, 2003, 2008, 2010, 2012, 2016, 2022

== See also ==
- Estonia women's national football team
- Estonia national under-23 football team
- Estonia national under-21 football team
- Estonia national under-19 football team
- Estonia national under-17 football team
- Estonia national youth football team
