= 2018 FIFA World Cup qualification – UEFA Group H =

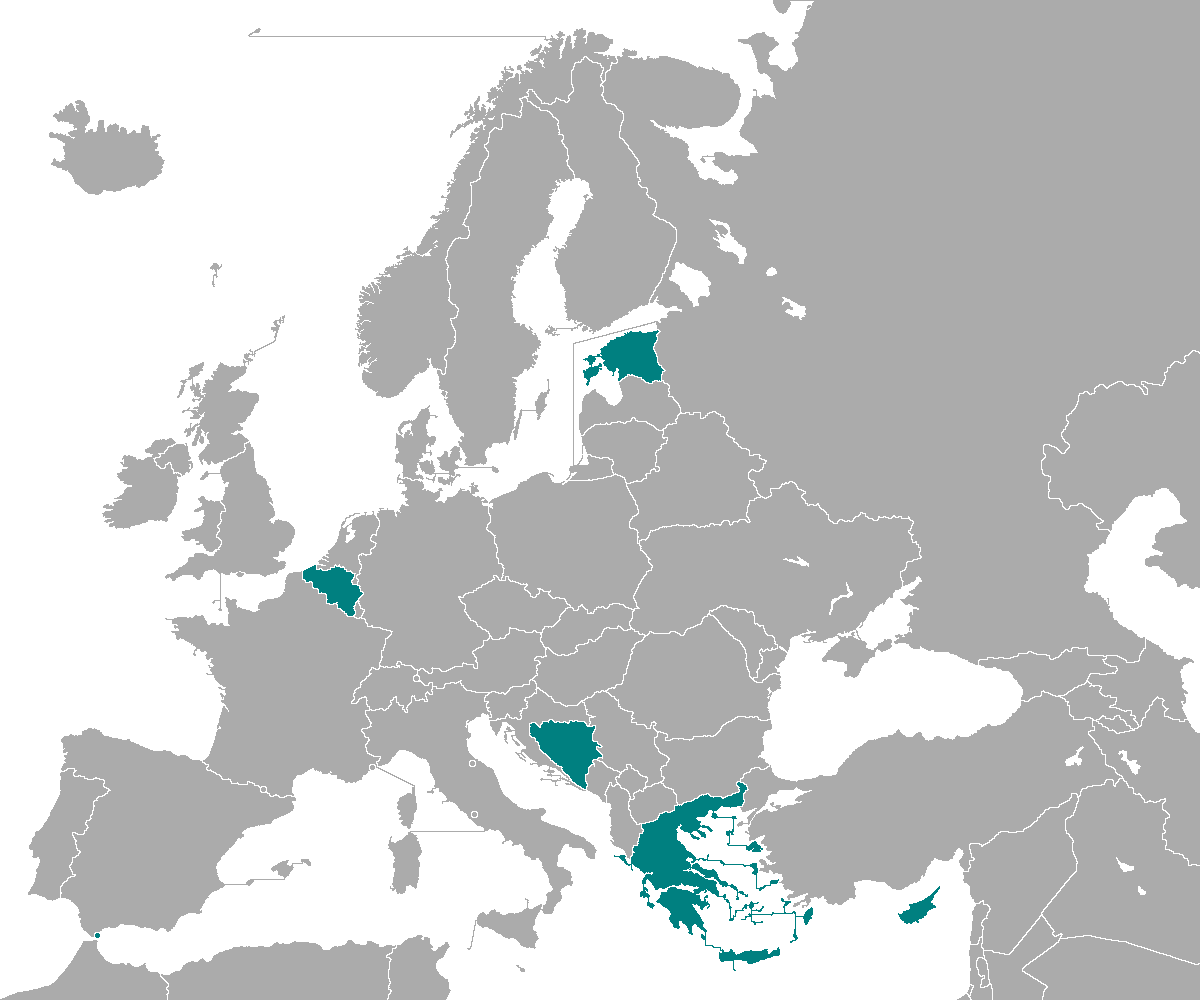

The 2018 FIFA World Cup qualification UEFA Group H was one of the nine UEFA groups for 2018 FIFA World Cup qualification. The group consisted of six teams: Belgium, Bosnia and Herzegovina, Greece, Estonia, Cyprus, and Gibraltar.

The draw for the first round (group stage) was held as part of the 2018 FIFA World Cup Preliminary Draw on 25 July 2015, starting 18:00 MSK (UTC+3), at the Konstantinovsky Palace in Strelna, Saint Petersburg, Russia. Gibraltar was added to the group after the draw, after becoming FIFA members together with Kosovo in May 2016, and UEFA decided not to put Kosovo in same group as Bosnia and Herzegovina for security reasons.

The group winners, Belgium, qualified directly for the 2018 FIFA World Cup. The group runners-up, Greece, advanced to the play-offs as one of the best eight runners-up.

Russia was initially partnered with the five-team Group H, which enabled the 2018 World Cup hosts to play centralised friendlies against these countries on their "spare" match dates. These friendlies would not have counted in the qualifying group standings. However, after the group was later expanded to include Gibraltar, these friendly matches were cancelled.

== Standings ==
2018 FIFA World Cup qualification tiebreakers
In league format, the ranking of teams in each group was based on the following criteria (regulations Articles 20.6 and 20.7):
1. Points (3 points for a win, 1 point for a draw, 0 points for a loss)
2. Overall goal difference
3. Overall goals scored
4. Points in matches between tied teams
5. Goal difference in matches between tied teams
6. Goals scored in matches between tied teams
7. Away goals scored in matches between tied teams (if the tie was only between two teams in home-and-away league format)
8. Fair play points
  - first yellow card: minus 1 point
  - indirect red card (second yellow card): minus 3 points
  - direct red card: minus 4 points
  - yellow card and direct red card: minus 5 points
9. Drawing of lots by the FIFA Organising Committee

| Pos | Team | Pld | W | D | L | GF | GA | GD | Pts | Qualification | Belgium | Greece | Bosnia and Herzegovina | Estonia | Cyprus | Gibraltar |
|---|---|---|---|---|---|---|---|---|---|---|---|---|---|---|---|---|
| 1 | Belgium | 10 | 9 | 1 | 0 | 43 | 6 | +37 | 28 | Qualification to 2018 FIFA World Cup | — | 1–1 | 4–0 | 8–1 | 4–0 | 9–0 |
| 2 | Greece | 10 | 5 | 4 | 1 | 17 | 6 | +11 | 19 | Advance to second round | 1–2 | — | 1–1 | 0–0 | 2–0 | 4–0 |
| 3 | Bosnia and Herzegovina | 10 | 5 | 2 | 3 | 24 | 13 | +11 | 17 | | 3–4 | 0–0 | — | 5–0 | 2–0 | 5–0 |
| 4 | Estonia | 10 | 3 | 2 | 5 | 13 | 19 | −6 | 11 | | 0–2 | 0–2 | 1–2 | — | 1–0 | 4–0 |
| 5 | Cyprus | 10 | 3 | 1 | 6 | 9 | 18 | −9 | 10 | | 0–3 | 1–2 | 3–2 | 0–0 | — | 3–1 |
| 6 | Gibraltar | 10 | 0 | 0 | 10 | 3 | 47 | −44 | 0 | | 0–6 | 1–4 | 0–4 | 0–6 | 1–2 | — |

Source: FIFA
Rules for classification: Qualification tiebreakers

== Matches ==
The fixture list prior to the inclusion of Gibraltar was confirmed by UEFA on 26 July 2015, the day following the draw. Times are CET/CEST, (Note: CET (UTC+1) for matches on 13 November 2016 and 25 March 2017, and CEST (UTC+2) for all other matches.) as listed by UEFA (local times are in parentheses).

6 September 2016
20:45
(20:45 UTC+2)

| Bosnia and Herzegovina | 5–0 | Estonia |
|---|---|---|
| Spahić 7', 90+2'; Džeko 23' (pen.); Medunjanin 71'; Ibišević 83' | Report (FIFA); Report (UEFA) |

Bilino Polje Stadium, Zenica
Attendance: 8,820
Referee: Miroslav Zelinka (Czech Republic)
6 September 2016
20:45
(21:45 UTC+3)

| Cyprus | 0–3 | Belgium |
|---|---|---|
| | Report (FIFA); Report (UEFA) | R. Lukaku 13', 61'; Carrasco 81' |

GSP Stadium, Nicosia
Attendance: 12,029
Referee: Felix Zwayer (Germany)
6 September 2016
20:45
(19:45 UTC+1)

| Gibraltar | 1–4 | Greece |
|---|---|---|
| Walker 26' | Report (FIFA); Report (UEFA) | Mitroglou 10'; Wiseman 44' (o.g.); Fortounis 45'; Torosidis 45+2' |

Estádio Algarve, Faro/Loulé (Portugal) (Note: Gibraltar play their home matches at Estádio Algarve, Faro/Loulé in Portugal instead of their regular stadium, Victoria Stadium, in Gibraltar.)
Attendance: 460
Referee: Jakob Kehlet (Denmark)

7 October 2016
20:45
(20:45 UTC+2)

| Belgium | 4–0 | Bosnia and Herzegovina |
|---|---|---|
| Spahić 26' (o.g.); Hazard 29'; Alderweireld 60'; R. Lukaku 79' | Report (FIFA); Report (UEFA) |

King Baudouin Stadium, Brussels
Attendance: 42,653
Referee: Martin Atkinson (England)
7 October 2016
20:45
(21:45 UTC+3)

| Estonia | 4–0 | Gibraltar |
|---|---|---|
| Käit 47', 70'; Vassiljev 52'; Mošnikov 88' | Report (FIFA); Report (UEFA) |

Lilleküla Stadium, Tallinn
Attendance: 4,678
Referee: Aleksei Eskov (Russia)
7 October 2016
20:45
(21:45 UTC+3)

| Greece | 2–0 | Cyprus |
|---|---|---|
| Mitroglou 12'; Mantalos 42' | Report (FIFA); Report (UEFA) |

Karaiskakis Stadium, Piraeus
Attendance: 16,512
Referee: Pavel Královec (Czech Republic)

10 October 2016
20:45
(20:45 UTC+2)

| Bosnia and Herzegovina | 2–0 | Cyprus |
|---|---|---|
| Džeko 70', 81' | Report (FIFA); Report (UEFA) |

Bilino Polje Stadium, Zenica
Attendance: 8,900
Referee: Xavier Estrada Fernández (Spain)
10 October 2016
20:45
(21:45 UTC+3)

| Estonia | 0–2 | Greece |
|---|---|---|
| | Report (FIFA); Report (UEFA) | Torosidis 2'; Stafylidis 60' |

Lilleküla Stadium, Tallinn
Attendance: 4,467
Referee: István Vad (Hungary)
10 October 2016
20:45
(19:45 UTC+1)

| Gibraltar | 0–6 | Belgium |
|---|---|---|
| | Report (FIFA); Report (UEFA) | Benteke 1', 43', 56'; Witsel 19'; Mertens 51'; E. Hazard 79' |

Estádio Algarve, Faro/Loulé (Portugal)
Attendance: 1,959
Referee: Paweł Raczkowski (Poland)

13 November 2016
18:00
(19:00 UTC+2)

| Cyprus | 3–1 | Gibraltar |
|---|---|---|
| Laifis 29'; Sotiriou 65'; Sielis 87' | Report (FIFA); Report (UEFA) | L. Casciaro 51' |

GSP Stadium, Nicosia
Attendance: 3,151
Referee: Aliyar Aghayev (Azerbaijan)
13 November 2016
20:45
(20:45 UTC+1)

| Belgium | 8–1 | Estonia |
|---|---|---|
| Meunier 8'; Mertens 16', 68'; E. Hazard 25'; Carrasco 62'; Klavan 64' (o.g.); Lukaku 83', 88' | Report (FIFA); Report (UEFA) | Anier 29' |

King Baudouin Stadium, Brussels
Attendance: 37,128
Referee: Alexandru Tudor (Romania)
13 November 2016
20:45
(21:45 UTC+2)

| Greece | 1–1 | Bosnia and Herzegovina |
|---|---|---|
| Tzavellas 90+5' | Report (FIFA); Report (UEFA) | Pjanić 32' |

Karaiskakis Stadium, Piraeus
Attendance: 20,075
Referee: Jonas Eriksson (Sweden)

25 March 2017
18:00
(18:00 UTC+1)

| Bosnia and Herzegovina | 5–0 | Gibraltar |
|---|---|---|
| Ibišević 4', 43'; Vršajević 52'; Višća 56'; Bičakčić 90+4' | Report (FIFA); Report (UEFA) |

Bilino Polje Stadium, Zenica
Attendance: 8,285
Referee: Svein-Erik Edvartsen (Norway)
25 March 2017
18:00
(19:00 UTC+2)

| Cyprus | 0–0 | Estonia |
|---|---|---|
| | Report (FIFA); Report (UEFA) |

GSP Stadium, Nicosia
Attendance: 3,864
Referee: Ville Nevalainen (Finland)
25 March 2017
20:45
(20:45 UTC+1)

| Belgium | 1–1 | Greece |
|---|---|---|
| Lukaku 89' | Report (FIFA); Report (UEFA) | Mitroglou 46' |

King Baudouin Stadium, Brussels
Attendance: 42,281
Referee: Felix Brych (Germany)

9 June 2017
20:45
(20:45 UTC+2)

| Bosnia and Herzegovina | 0–0 | Greece |
|---|---|---|
| | Report (FIFA); Report (UEFA) |

Bilino Polje Stadium, Zenica
Attendance: 11,000
Referee: Nicola Rizzoli (Italy)
9 June 2017
20:45
(21:45 UTC+3)

| Estonia | 0–2 | Belgium |
|---|---|---|
| | Report (FIFA); Report (UEFA) | Mertens 31'; Chadli 86' |

Lilleküla Stadium, Tallinn
Attendance: 10,176
Referee: John Beaton (Scotland)
9 June 2017
20:45
(19:45 UTC+1)

| Gibraltar | 1–2 | Cyprus |
|---|---|---|
| Hernandez 30' | Report (FIFA); Report (UEFA) | R. Chipolina 10' (o.g.); Sotiriou 87' |

Estádio Algarve, Faro/Loulé (Portugal)
Attendance: 488
Referee: Nikola Popov (Bulgaria)

31 August 2017
20:45
(20:45 UTC+2)

| Belgium | 9–0 | Gibraltar |
|---|---|---|
| Mertens 16'; Meunier 18', 61', 67'; R. Lukaku 21', 38', 82' (pen.); Witsel 27'; E. Hazard 45' | Report (FIFA); Report (UEFA) |

Stade Maurice Dufrasne, Liège
Attendance: 24,050
Referee: Neil Doyle (Republic of Ireland)
31 August 2017
20:45
(21:45 UTC+3)

| Cyprus | 3–2 | Bosnia and Herzegovina |
|---|---|---|
| Christofi 65'; Laban 67'; Sotiriou 76' | Report (FIFA); Report (UEFA) | Šunjić 33'; Višća 44' |

GSP Stadium, Nicosia
Attendance: 4,143
Referee: Andre Marriner (England)
31 August 2017
20:45
(21:45 UTC+3)

| Greece | 0–0 | Estonia |
|---|---|---|
| | Report (FIFA); Report (UEFA) |

Karaiskakis Stadium, Piraeus
Attendance: 12,379
Referee: Liran Liany (Israel)

3 September 2017
18:00
(19:00 UTC+3)

| Estonia | 1–0 | Cyprus |
|---|---|---|
| Käit 90+2' | Report (FIFA); Report (UEFA) |

Lilleküla Stadium, Tallinn
Attendance: 5,491
Referee: Adrien Jaccottet (Switzerland)
3 September 2017
20:45
(21:45 UTC+3)

| Greece | 1–2 | Belgium |
|---|---|---|
| Zeca 73' | Report (FIFA); Report (UEFA) | Vertonghen 70'; Lukaku 74' |

Karaiskakis Stadium, Piraeus
Attendance: 29,465
Referee: Szymon Marciniak (Poland)
3 September 2017
20:45
(19:45 UTC+1)

| Gibraltar | 0–4 | Bosnia and Herzegovina |
|---|---|---|
| | Report (FIFA); Report (UEFA) | Džeko 35', 85'; Kodro 65'; Lulić 83' |

Estádio Algarve, Faro/Loulé (Portugal)
Attendance: 805
Referee: Þorvaldur Árnason (Iceland)

7 October 2017
18:00
(17:00 UTC+1)

| Gibraltar | 0–6 | Estonia |
|---|---|---|
| | Report (FIFA); Report (UEFA) | Luts 10'; Käit 30'; Zenjov 38'; Tamm 52', 66', 77' |

Estádio Algarve, Faro/Loulé (Portugal)
Attendance: 750
Referee: Fran Jović (Croatia)
7 October 2017
18:00
(18:00 UTC+2)

| Bosnia and Herzegovina | 3–4 | Belgium |
|---|---|---|
| Medunjanin 30'; Višća 39'; Đumić 82' | Report (FIFA); Report (UEFA) | Meunier 4'; Batshuayi 59'; Vertonghen 68'; Carrasco 84' |

Stadion Grbavica, Sarajevo (Note: Bosnia and Herzegovina were sanctioned by FIFA to play one home match (against Belgium on 7 October 2017) away from Bilino Polje Stadium, Zenica due to a series of incidents during their home match against Greece.)
Attendance: 9,657
Referee: Willie Collum (Scotland)
7 October 2017
20:45
(21:45 UTC+3)

| Cyprus | 1–2 | Greece |
|---|---|---|
| Sotiriou 17' | Report (FIFA); Report (UEFA) | Mitroglou 25'; Tziolis 26' |

GSP Stadium, Nicosia
Attendance: 7,222
Referee: Alberto Undiano Mallenco (Spain)

10 October 2017
20:45
(20:45 UTC+2)

| Belgium | 4–0 | Cyprus |
|---|---|---|
| E. Hazard 12', 63' (pen.); T. Hazard 52'; Lukaku 78' | Report (FIFA); Report (UEFA) |

King Baudouin Stadium, Brussels
Attendance: 37,765
Referee: Luca Banti (Italy)
10 October 2017
20:45
(21:45 UTC+3)

| Estonia | 1–2 | Bosnia and Herzegovina |
|---|---|---|
| Antonov 75' | Report (FIFA); Report (UEFA) | Hajrović 48', 84' |

Lilleküla Stadium, Tallinn
Attendance: 4,967
Referee: Vladislav Bezborodov (Russia)
10 October 2017
20:45
(21:45 UTC+3)

| Greece | 4–0 | Gibraltar |
|---|---|---|
| Torosidis 32'; Mitroglou 61', 63'; Gianniotas 78' | Report (FIFA); Report (UEFA) |

Karaiskakis Stadium, Piraeus
Attendance: 12,739
Referee: Giorgi Kruashvili (Georgia)

== Goalscorers ==
There were 109 goals scored in 30 matches, for an average of 3.63 goals per match.

11 goals

- (Belgium) Romelu Lukaku

6 goals

- (Belgium) Eden Hazard
- (Greece) Konstantinos Mitroglou

5 goals

- (Belgium) Dries Mertens
- (Belgium) Thomas Meunier
- (Bosnia and Herzegovina) Edin Džeko

4 goals

- (Cyprus) Pieros Sotiriou
- (Estonia) Mattias Käit

3 goals

- (Belgium) Christian Benteke
- (Belgium) Yannick Carrasco
- (Bosnia and Herzegovina) Vedad Ibišević
- (Bosnia and Herzegovina) Edin Višća
- (Estonia) Joonas Tamm
- (Greece) Vasilis Torosidis

2 goals

- (Belgium) Jan Vertonghen
- (Belgium) Axel Witsel
- (Bosnia and Herzegovina) Izet Hajrović
- (Bosnia and Herzegovina) Haris Medunjanin
- (Bosnia and Herzegovina) Emir Spahić

1 goal

- (Belgium) Toby Alderweireld
- (Belgium) Michy Batshuayi
- (Belgium) Nacer Chadli
- (Belgium) Thorgan Hazard
- (Bosnia and Herzegovina) Ermin Bičakčić
- (Bosnia and Herzegovina) Dario Đumić
- (Bosnia and Herzegovina) Kenan Kodro
- (Bosnia and Herzegovina) Senad Lulić
- (Bosnia and Herzegovina) Miralem Pjanić
- (Bosnia and Herzegovina) Toni Šunjić
- (Bosnia and Herzegovina) Avdija Vršajević
- (Cyprus) Demetris Christofi
- (Cyprus) Vincent Laban
- (Cyprus) Constantinos Laifis
- (Cyprus) Valentinos Sielis
- (Estonia) Henri Anier
- (Estonia) Ilja Antonov
- (Estonia) Siim Luts
- (Estonia) Sergei Mošnikov
- (Estonia) Konstantin Vassiljev
- (Estonia) Sergei Zenjov
- (Gibraltar) Lee Casciaro
- (Gibraltar) Anthony Hernandez
- (Gibraltar) Liam Walker
- (Greece) Kostas Fortounis
- (Greece) Giannis Gianniotas
- (Greece) Petros Mantalos
- (Greece) Kostas Stafylidis
- (Greece) Georgios Tzavellas
- (Greece) Alexandros Tziolis
- (Greece) Zeca

1 own goal

- (Bosnia and Herzegovina) Emir Spahić (against Belgium)
- (Estonia) Ragnar Klavan (against Belgium)
- (Gibraltar) Roy Chipolina (against Cyprus)
- (Gibraltar) Scott Wiseman (against Greece)

== Discipline ==
A player was automatically suspended for the next match for the following offences:

- Receiving a red card (red card suspensions could be extended for serious offences)
- Receiving two yellow cards in two different matches (yellow card suspensions were carried forward to the play-offs, but not the finals or any other future international matches)

The following suspensions were served during the qualifying matches:

| Player | Team | Offence(s) | Suspended for match(es) |
|---|---|---|---|
| Marouane Fellaini | Belgium | (yellow card) vs Cyprus (6 September 2016); (yellow card) vs Bosnia and Herzegovina (7 October 2016) | vs Gibraltar (10 October 2016) |
| Edin Džeko | Bosnia and Herzegovina | (yellow card) (yellow-red card) vs Greece (13 November 2016) | vs Gibraltar (25 March 2017) |
| Mato Jajalo | Bosnia and Herzegovina | (yellow card) vs Belgium (7 October 2016); (yellow card) vs Greece (13 November 2016) | vs Gibraltar (25 March 2017) |
| Senad Lulić | Bosnia and Herzegovina | (yellow card) vs Belgium (7 October 2016); (yellow card) vs Greece (13 November 2016) | vs Gibraltar (25 March 2017) |
| Ognjen Vranješ | Bosnia and Herzegovina | (yellow card) vs Estonia (6 September 2016); (yellow card) vs Greece (13 November 2016) | vs Gibraltar (25 March 2017) |
| Jason Demetriou | Cyprus | (yellow card) vs Greece (7 October 2016); (yellow card) vs Gibraltar (13 November 2016) | vs Estonia (25 March 2017) |
| Pieros Sotiriou | Cyprus | (yellow card) vs Bosnia and Herzegovina (10 October 2016); (yellow card) vs Gibraltar (13 November 2016) | vs Estonia (25 March 2017) |
| Jayce Olivero | Gibraltar | (yellow card) (yellow-red card) vs Cyprus (13 November 2016) | vs Bosnia and Herzegovina (25 March 2017) |
| Kyriakos Papadopoulos | Greece | (red card) vs Bosnia and Herzegovina (13 November 2016) | vs Belgium (25 March 2017) vs Bosnia and Herzegovina (9 June 2017) |
| Sead Kolašinac | Bosnia and Herzegovina | (yellow card) vs Belgium (7 October 2016); (yellow card) vs Gibraltar (25 March 2017) | vs Greece (9 June 2017) |
| Vincent Laban | Cyprus | (yellow card) vs Belgium (6 September 2016); (yellow card) vs Estonia (25 March 2017) | vs Gibraltar (9 June 2017) |
| Andreas Samaris | Greece | (yellow card) vs Bosnia and Herzegovina (13 November 2016); (yellow card) vs Belgium (25 March 2017) | vs Bosnia and Herzegovina (9 June 2017) |
| Panagiotis Tachtsidis | Greece | (yellow card) (yellow-red card) vs Belgium (25 March 2017) | vs Bosnia and Herzegovina (9 June 2017) |
| Georgios Tzavellas | Greece | (yellow card) (yellow-red card) vs Belgium (25 March 2017) | vs Bosnia and Herzegovina (9 June 2017) |
| Konstantinos Laifis | Cyprus | (yellow card) vs Belgium (6 September 2016); (yellow card) vs Gibraltar (9 June 2017) | vs Bosnia and Herzegovina (31 August 2017) |
| Artjom Dmitrijev | Estonia | (red card) vs Belgium (9 June 2017) | vs Greece (31 August 2017) |
| Karol Mets | Estonia | (yellow card) vs Bosnia and Herzegovina (6 September 2016); (yellow card) vs Belgium (9 June 2017) | vs Greece (31 August 2017) |
| Sokratis Papastathopoulos | Greece | (yellow card) vs Bosnia and Herzegovina (13 November 2016); (yellow card) vs Bosnia and Herzegovina (9 June 2017) | vs Estonia (31 August 2017) |
| Axel Witsel | Belgium | (red card) vs Gibraltar (31 August 2017) | vs Greece (3 September 2017) |
| Miralem Pjanić | Bosnia and Herzegovina | (yellow card) vs Greece (13 November 2016); (yellow card) vs Cyprus (31 August 2017) | vs Gibraltar (3 September 2017) |
| Ragnar Klavan | Estonia | (yellow card) vs Bosnia and Herzegovina (6 September 2016); (yellow card) vs Greece (31 August 2017) | vs Cyprus (3 September 2017) |
| Erin Barnett | Gibraltar | (red card) vs Belgium (31 August 2017) | vs Bosnia and Herzegovina (3 September 2017) |
| Ervin Zukanović | Bosnia and Herzegovina | (yellow card) vs Greece (9 June 2017); (yellow card) vs Gibraltar (3 September 2017) | vs Belgium (7 October 2017) |
| Yannick Carrasco | Belgium | (yellow card) vs Greece (3 September 2017); (yellow card) vs Bosnia and Herzegovina (7 October 2017) | vs Cyprus (10 October 2017) |
| Anastasios Donis | Greece | (yellow card) vs Bosnia and Herzegovina (9 June 2017); (yellow card) vs Cyprus (7 October 2017) | vs Gibraltar (10 October 2017) |
| Kostas Manolas | Greece | (yellow card) vs Bosnia and Herzegovina (9 June 2017); (yellow card) vs Cyprus (7 October 2017) | vs Gibraltar (10 October 2017) |
| Andreas Samaris | Greece | (yellow card) vs Belgium (3 September 2017); (yellow card) vs Cyprus (7 October 2017) | vs Gibraltar (10 October 2017) |
