= Estonian Footballer of the Year =

Estonian award

The Estonian Footballer of the Year (Estonian: Eesti aasta parim jalgpallur) is an annual award given to the best performing Estonian footballer of the respective year. The award has been presented since 1992. From 1992 to 1994, the winner was chosen by Päevaleht, from 1995 to 2000 by Eesti Päevaleht, and from 2002 to 2003 by Estonian football journalists (EJAK). The Estonian Football Association (EJL) also named their player of the year from 1994 to 2003. Since 2004, the winner is chosen by representatives of the Estonian Football Association and football journalists. Ragnar Klavan has won the award a record seven times. The current holder is Karl Jakob Hein.

== Winners ==
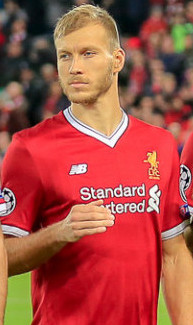
Ragnar Klavan has the most Footballer of the Year awards, with seven.

| Year | Player | Club |
|---|---|---|
| 1992 | Urmas Hepner | (Finland) Kumu |
| 1993 | Mart Poom | (Estonia) Flora |
| 1994 | Mart Poom (2) | (Switzerland) FC Wil |
| 1995 | Martin Reim | (Estonia) Flora |
| 1996 | Marek Lemsalu | (Estonia) Flora |
| 1997 | Mart Poom (3) | (England) Derby County |
| 1998 | Mart Poom (4) | (England) Derby County |
| 1998 | Urmas Kirs | (Estonia) Flora |
| 1999 | Andres Oper | (Denmark) AaB |
| 2000 | Mart Poom (5) | (England) Derby County |
| 2001 | Indrek Zelinski | (Denmark) AaB |
| 2002 | Andres Oper (2) | (Denmark) AaB |
| 2002 | Raio Piiroja | (Estonia) Flora |
| 2003 | Mart Poom (6) | (England) Sunderland |
| 2004 | Andrei Stepanov | (Russia) Torpedo Moscow |
| 2005 | Andres Oper (3) | (Netherlands) Roda JC |
| 2006 | Raio Piiroja (2) | (Norway) Fredrikstad |
| 2007 | Raio Piiroja (3) | (Norway) Fredrikstad |
| 2008 | Raio Piiroja (4) | (Norway) Fredrikstad |
| 2009 | Raio Piiroja (5) | (Norway) Fredrikstad |
| 2010 | Konstantin Vassiljev | (Slovenia) Nafta Lendava |
| 2011 | Konstantin Vassiljev (2) | (Russia) Amkar Perm |
| 2012 | Ragnar Klavan | (Germany) FC Augsburg |
| 2013 | Konstantin Vassiljev (3) | (Russia) Amkar Perm |
| 2014 | Ragnar Klavan (2) | (Germany) FC Augsburg |
| 2015 | Ragnar Klavan (3) | (Germany) FC Augsburg |
| 2016 | Ragnar Klavan (4) | (England) Liverpool |
| 2017 | Ragnar Klavan (5) | (England) Liverpool |
| 2018 | Ragnar Klavan (6) | (Italy) Cagliari |
| 2019 | Ragnar Klavan (7) | (Italy) Cagliari |
| 2020 | Rauno Sappinen | (Estonia) Flora |
| 2021 | Rauno Sappinen (2) | (Estonia) Flora |
| 2022 | Joonas Tamm | (Romania) FCSB |
| 2023 | Karol Mets | (Germany) FC St. Pauli |
| 2024 | Karol Mets (2) | (Germany) FC St. Pauli |
| 2025 | Karl Jakob Hein | (Germany) Werder Bremen |

1. Voted by Eesti Päevaleht
2. Voted by EJL
3. Voted by EJAK
1. On loan from Arsenal

== See also ==
- Estonian Female Footballer of the Year
- Estonian Young Footballer of the Year
- Estonian Female Young Footballer of the Year
- Estonian Football Manager of the Year
- Estonian Silverball
