= Estonian Football Manager of the Year =

Estonian award

The Estonian Coach of the Year, also known as the Albert Vollrat Coach of the Year (Albert Vollrati nimeline aasta treeneri auhind), is an association football award given to the manager in Estonia that is considered the best in the previous season of both club and national team competition.

The award, named after the former Estonia national team manager Albert Vollrat, has been presented annually by the Estonian Football Association since 2013. Eligible are Estonian managers and non-Estonian managers coaching in Estonia.

== Winners ==
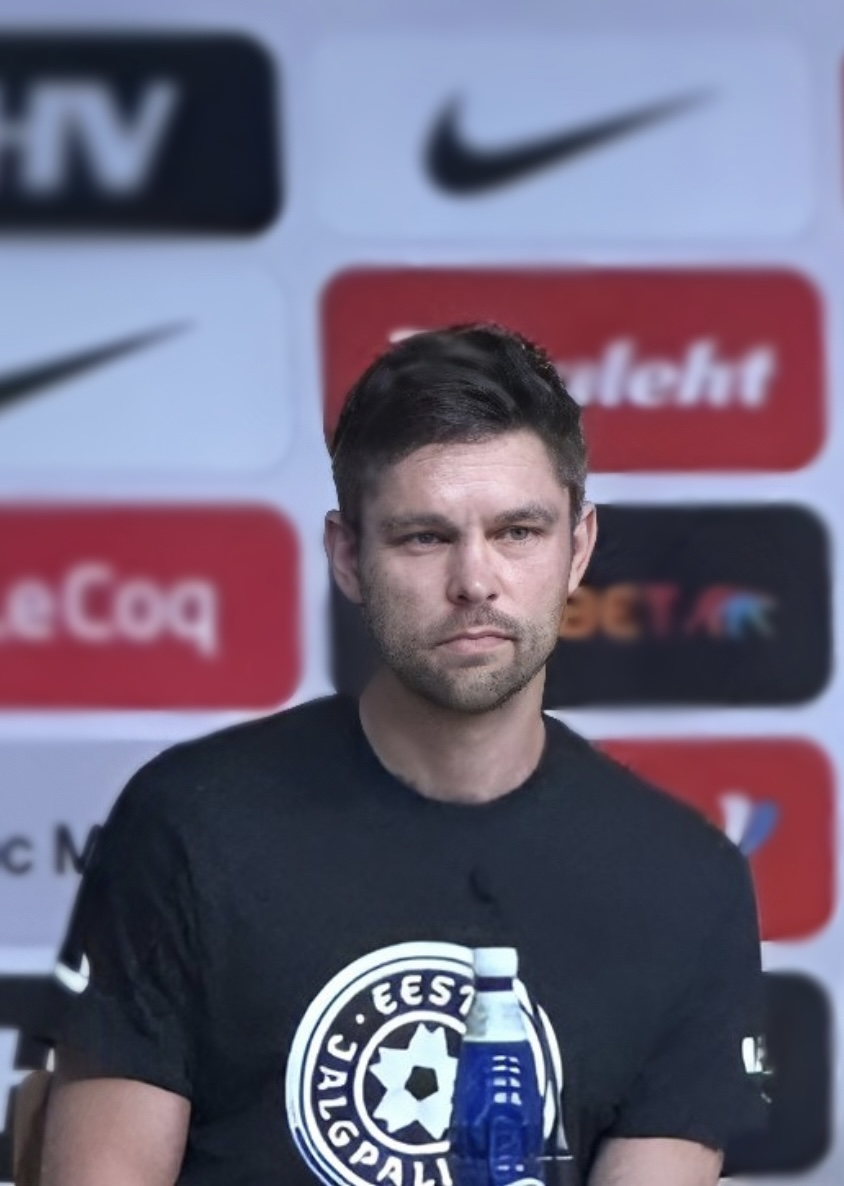
Jürgen Henn has won the award four times with Flora.

Year	Manager	Team
2013	Marko Kristal	Levadia
2014	Jüri Saar	Pärnu (women)
2015	Rando Rand	Estonia (beach soccer)
2016	Aleksandr Puštov	Infonet
2017	(Netherlands) Arno Pijpers	Flora
2018	(Russia) Sergei Frantsev	Nõmme Kalju
2019	Jürgen Henn	Flora
2020	Jürgen Henn (2)	Flora
2021	Jürgen Henn (3)	Flora
2022	Jürgen Henn (4)	Flora
2023	Aivar Anniste; Daniel Meijel	Tallinna Kalev
2024	(Spain) Curro Torres	FCI Levadia
2025	Konstantin Vassiljev	Flora

== See also ==
- Estonian Footballer of the Year
- Estonian Female Footballer of the Year
- Estonian Young Footballer of the Year
- Estonian Female Young Footballer of the Year
