= Tarmo Neemelo =

Estonian footballer (born 1982)

Personal information
- Full name: Tarmo Neemelo
- Date of birth: 10 February 1982 (age 44)
- Place of birth: Paide, then part of Estonian SSR, Soviet Union
- Height: 1.91 m (6 ft 3 in)
- Position: Striker

Youth career
- Lelle

Senior career*
Years	Team	Apps	(Gls)
1998–1999	Flora Kehtna	20	(8)
1998–2000	Lelle	11	(3)
2000–2003	Kuressaare	77	(24)
2000	Muhumaa	3	(0)
2001	→ Tervis Pärnu (loan)	2	(2)
2004–2006	TVMK	58	(54)
2004	TVMK II	4	(3)
2006–2007	Helsingborgs IF	5	(0)
2006	→ TVMK (loan)	17	(7)
2007	→ GIF Sundsvall (loan)	24	(8)
2008	MYPA	24	(8)
2009	Zulte Waregem	11	(0)
2009–2010	Levadia	49	(29)
2011–2017	Nõmme Kalju	220	(96)
2015	→ Nõmme Kalju II	2	(2)
2018–2019	Paide Linnameeskond	51	(8)
Total		578	(253)

International career
1998	Estonia U17	1	(0)
1999	Estonia U18	2	(0)
2000	Estonia U19	3	(0)
2001–2003	Estonia U21	9	(0)
2005–2012	Estonia	22	(1)
- * Club domestic league appearances and goals as of 3 June 2018

Tarmo Neemelo (born 10 February 1982) is an Estonian retired professional footballer who last played as a striker for Meistriliiga club Paide Linnameeskond.

Neemelo was the top goalscorer in the 2005 Meistriliiga with 41 goals, and won the Estonian Silverball award in 2006.

== Club career ==
=== Early career ===
Neemelo started playing football with Lelle. He then spent several years playing for various reserve and feeder teams affiliated with Flora.

=== TVMK ===
In 2004, he signed for Meistriliiga club TVMK. In the 2005 season, he won his first Meistriliiga title, scoring a league record 41 goals, which put him in 12th place in the European Golden Shoe.

=== Helsingborg ===
In 2006, he signed for Swedish Allsvenskan club Helsingborgs IF, to potentially partner fellow striker Henrik Larsson. However, Neemelo was unable to secure a first-team position and was loaned back to TVMK. In 2007, he was once again loaned out, this time to Superettan club GIF Sundsvall.

=== MYPA ===
In February 2008, he signed a two-year contract with Finnish Veikkausliiga club MYPA.

=== Zulte Waregem ===
In January 2009, he signed for Belgian side Zulte Waregem. He was mostly used as a substitute, being a part of the starting line-up just twice. He was released by Zulte Waregem in July 2009 by mutual consent.

=== Levadia ===
In 2009, Neemelo returned to Estonia and signed with Levadia. He won his second Meistriliiga title in the 2009 season.

=== Nõmme Kalju ===
Neemelo's contract with Levadia ran out after the 2010 season. On 7 February 2011, Neemelo signed a two-year contract with Nõmme Kalju. He was the team's top goalscorer in the league in 2011 and 2012 with 22 goals in both seasons. Neemelo won his third Meistriliiga title in the 2012 season.

== International career ==
Neemelo made his international debut for Estonia on 20 April 2005, against Norway in a friendly. He scored his first goal for the national team on 28 May 2006, in a friendly match against Turkey. The goal won him the Estonian Silverball award.

=== International goals ===
Estonia score listed first, score column indicates score after each Neemelo goal.

International goals by date, venue, cap, opponent, score, result and competition
No.	Date	Venue	Cap	Opponent	Score	Result	Competition
1	28 May 2006	Millerntor-Stadion, Hamburg, Germany	9	Turkey	1–1	1–1	Friendly

== Honours ==
=== Club ===
TVMK

- Meistriliiga: 2005
- Estonian Supercup: 2005, 2006

Levadia

- Meistriliiga: 2009
- Estonian Supercup: 2010

Nõmme Kalju

- Meistriliiga: 2012
- Estonian Cup: 2014–15

=== Individual ===
- Meistriliiga top scorer: 2005
- Estonian Silverball: 2006
