= Urmas Hepner =

Estonian footballer

Personal information
- Full name: Urmas Hepner
- Date of birth: 31 July 1964 (age 62)
- Place of birth: Tallinn, then part of Estonian SSR, Soviet Union

Senior career*
Years	Team	Apps	(Gls)
1979–1982	FC Norma Tallinn	37	(15)
1980	Noorus Tallinn	15	(2)
1983–1984	KSKM Tallinn	63	(12)
1985–1986	Sport Tallinn	52	(8)
1986	FC Flora Tallinn	2	(0)
1987–1990	Sport Tallinn	113	(13)
1991–1992	Kumu Kuusankoski	44	(2)
1992–1993	Kotkan Työväen Palloilijat	41	(0)
1993–1994	FC Norma Tallinn	13	(4)
1994	FC Lantana Tallinn	10	(1)
1995	FC Norma Tallinn	14	(1)
1995–1998	Tallinna Sadam	52	(4)
1998–2000	HyPS Hyvinkää	19	(1)
2001	S.C. Real Maardu	16	(0)
2002	JK Maardu	1	(0)
2003–2004	FC Levadia Tallinn II	13	(0)

International career
1992–1994	Estonia	13	(0)
- * Club domestic league appearances and goals

Urmas Hepner (born 31 July 1964) is an Estonian former footballer, who is currently coaching Levadia Tallinn's reserves, as well as working in the club's youth system. In 1992 Hepner was named Estonian Footballer of the Year.

During his career, Hepner played for numerous clubs in Estonia and Finland and won a total of 13 caps for Estonia national football team. He earned his first official cap on 3 June 1992, when Estonia played Slovenia in a friendly match.

== Career statistics ==
=== International ===
Appearances and goals by national team and year
National team	Year	Apps	Goals
Estonia	1992	3	0
Estonia	1993	9	0
Estonia	1994	1	0
Total		13	0

== Honours ==
=== Individual ===
- Estonian Footballer of the Year: 1992
