= Estonian Young Footballer of the Year =

Estonian award

The Estonian Young Footballer of the Year is an annual award given to the best Estonian young footballer since 2008.

== Winners ==
| Year | Player | Club |
|---|---|---|
| 2008 | Sergei Zenjov | (Ukraine) Karpaty Lviv |
| 2009 | Sander Puri | (Estonia) Levadia |
| 2010 | Sergei Zenjov (2) | (Ukraine) Karpaty Lviv |
| 2011 | Marko Meerits | (Netherlands) Vitesse |
| 2012 | Henrik Ojamaa | (Scotland) Motherwell |
| 2013 | Marko Meerits (2) | (Netherlands) Vitesse |
| 2014 | Karol Mets | (Estonia) Flora |
| 2015 | Rauno Sappinen | (Estonia) Flora |
| 2016 | Mattias Käit | (England) Fulham |
| 2017 | Mattias Käit (2) | (England) Fulham |
| 2018 | Rauno Sappinen (2) | (Netherlands) FC Den Bosch |
| 2019 | Erik Sorga | (Estonia) Flora |
| 2020 | Karl Jakob Hein | (England) Arsenal |
| 2021 | Karl Jakob Hein (2) | (England) Arsenal |
| 2022 | Markus Soomets | (Estonia) Flora |
| 2023 | Maksim Paskotši | (Switzerland) Grasshoppers |
| 2024 | Karl Jakob Hein (3) | (Spain) Real Valladolid |
| 2025 | Patrik Kristal | (Germany) 1. FC Köln |

== See also ==
- Estonian Footballer of the Year
- Estonian Female Footballer of the Year
- Estonian Female Young Footballer of the Year
- Estonian Football Manager of the Year
