= Henrik Ojamaa =

Estonian footballer (born 1991)

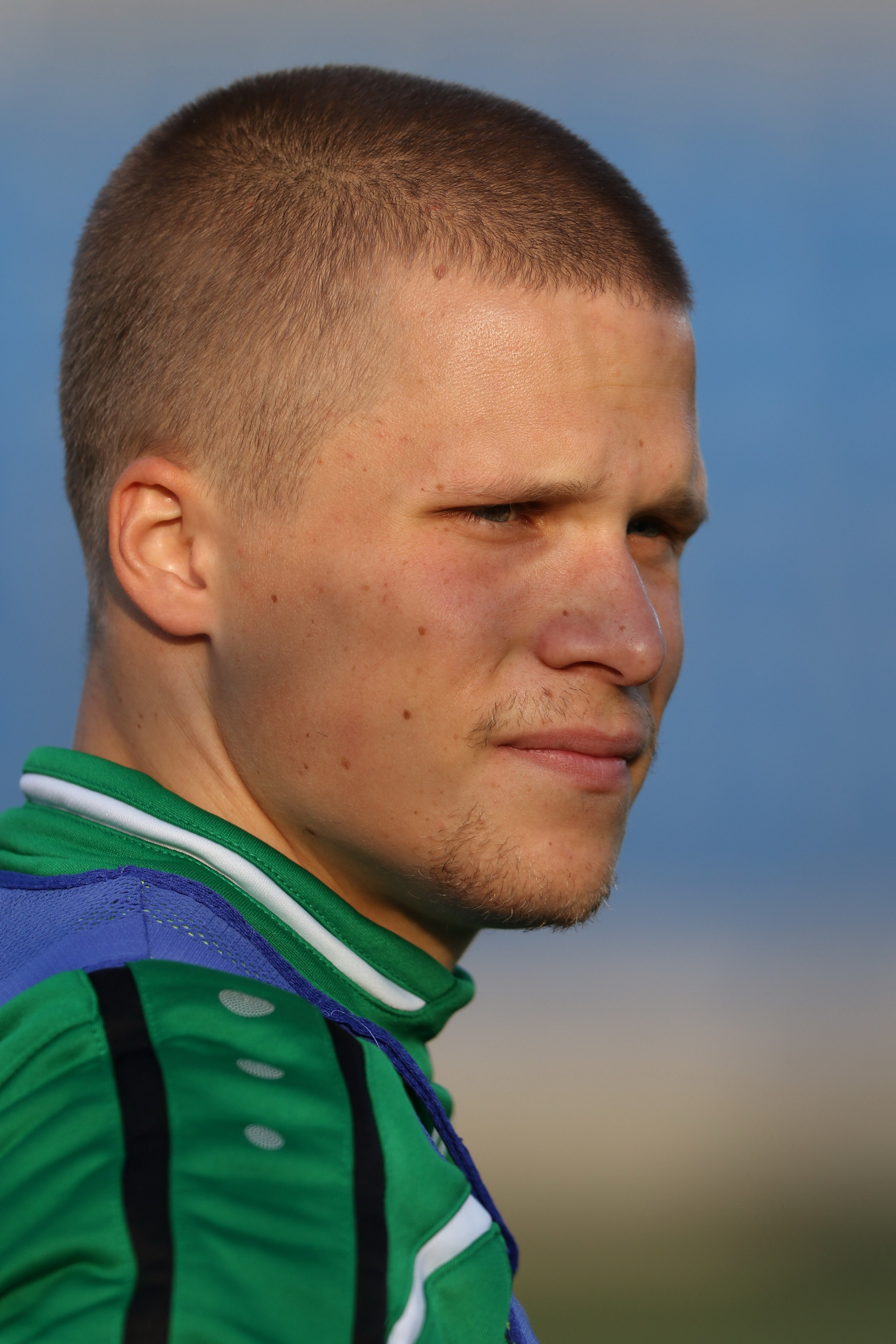
- Ojamaa in 2016

Personal information
- Full name: Henrik Ojamaa
- Date of birth: 20 May 1991 (age 35)
- Place of birth: Tallinn, Estonia
- Height: 1.76 m (5 ft 9 1/2 in)
- Position: Forward

Team information
- Current team: Paide Linnameeskond
- Number: 8

Youth career
- 2002–2007: Flora
- 2007–2009: Derby County

Senior career*
Years	Team	Apps	(Gls)
2007	Flora II	7	(1)
2009–2010	Derby County	0	(0)
2009	→ Stafford Rangers (loan)	5	(1)
2010–2011	Alemannia Aachen II	10	(1)
2010–2011	Alemannia Aachen	1	(0)
2011	→ Fortuna Sittard (loan)	12	(1)
2011	RoPS	17	(2)
2012–2013	Motherwell	55	(11)
2013–2015	Legia Warsaw	34	(2)
2014–2015	→ Motherwell (loan)	18	(3)
2015	→ Sarpsborg 08 2 (loan)	2	(1)
2015	→ Sarpsborg 08 (loan)	10	(0)
2015–2016	Swindon Town	9	(0)
2016	Wacker Innsbruck	16	(2)
2016–2017	Go Ahead Eagles	6	(1)
2017	→ Dundee (loan)	14	(0)
2017–2018	Gorica	19	(6)
2018–2020	Miedź Legnica	55	(6)
2020–2021	Widzew Łódź	24	(1)
2021–2023	Flora	86	(21)
2024–	Paide Linnameeskond	75	(7)

International career^{‡}
2006	Estonia U17	3	(0)
2008–2009	Estonia U19	12	(1)
2008–2011	Estonia U21	3	(3)
2012–2023	Estonia	63	(1)
- * Club domestic league appearances and goals as of 17 November 2026 ‡ National team caps and goals as of 1 April 2024

Henrik Ojamaa (born 20 May 1991) is an Estonian professional footballer who plays as a forward for Meistriliiga club Paide Linnameeskond.

In 2012, Ojamaa was named the Estonian Young Footballer of the Year.

== Club career ==
=== Flora ===
Ojamaa began playing football with the Flora youth academy. He made his senior league debut for the club's reserve side Flora II in the Esiliiga on 4 April 2007.

=== Derby County ===
In 2007, Ojamaa joined the Derby County academy. He was Derby County's Scholar of the Year in the 2008–09 season. In June 2009, he signed his first professional contract. On 28 November 2009, Ojamaa joined Stafford Rangers on a one-month loan. He won numerous Man of the Match awards during his short spell at the Conference North side. On 5 May 2010, it was announced that Ojamaa would be released after the 2009–10 season.

=== Alemannia Aachen ===
On 19 May 2010, Ojamaa signed a two-year contract with 2. Bundesliga club Alemannia Aachen. He made a single appearance in the 2. Bundesliga on 27 November 2010, replacing Babacar Gueye in the 88th minute of a 1–3 loss to FC Augsburg at New Tivoli.

==== Fortuna Sittard (loan) ====
In January 2011, Ojamaa joined Eerste Divisie club Fortuna Sittard on loan for the remainder of the 2010–11 season.

=== RoPS ===
On 22 July 2011, Ojamaa signed for the Veikkausliiga club RoPS for the remainder of the 2011 season. He went on to score two goals in 17 appearances, but couldn't save his club from relegation.

=== Motherwell ===
On 4 January 2012, Ojamaa signed for Scottish Premier League club Motherwell until the end of the 2011–12 season. He made an instant impact on his debut for Motherwell, scoring in a 4–0 home win over Queen's Park in the fourth round of the Scottish Cup on 7 January 2012. Ojamaa made his debut in the Scottish Premier League on 14 January 2012, when he came on as a 71st-minute substitute for Omar Daley in a 0–1 home loss to Inverness Caledonian Thistle. He scored four goals in his first five appearances for Motherwell and on 2 February 2012, he signed a new two-and-a-half-year contract with the club. Ojamaa celebrated his contract extension with another goal and two assists in a 6–0 victory over Greenock Morton in a Scottish Cup match on 4 February 2012. Ojamaa became referred to as "The Sheriff" by fans during his stay at Motherwell due to his pistols goal celebration. His performances in January 2012 led to him being named Scottish Premier League Young Player of the Month, as well as the player of the fifth round of the Scottish Cup.

In addition to his four goals in the 2012–13 season, Ojamaa was also the league's top assist provider with 16.

=== Legia Warsaw ===
On 6 June 2013, Ojamaa signed a three-year contract with Polish champions Legia Warsaw for a fee of €500,000. He made his debut in the Ekstraklasa on 27 July 2013, coming on as a substitute and providing an assist for Vladimir Dvalishvili's goal in the 3–0 away victory over Pogoń Szczecin. Ojamaa scored his first Ekstraklasa goal on 3 August 2013, in a 4–0 home victory over Podbeskidzie Bielsko-Biała. He won the Ekstraklasa title in the 2013–14 season, his first league title.

==== Motherwell (loan) ====
On 14 August 2014, Ojamaa returned to Motherwell on a six-month loan deal. At the conclusion of the loan in January 2015, Ojamaa opted not to extend his stay at Motherwell and returned to Legia Warsaw.

==== Sarpsborg 08 (loan) ====
On 2 February 2015, Ojamaa joined Tippeligaen club Sarpsborg 08 on loan. He made his debut in the Tippeligaen on 6 April 2015, in a 1–0 away victory over Tromsø.

=== Swindon Town ===
On 4 September 2015, Ojamaa signed for League One side Swindon Town on a one-year deal. He made his debut for Swindon Town on 12 September 2015, in a 1–4 away loss to Barnsley.

=== Wacker Innsbruck ===
On 7 January 2016, Ojamaa signed for Erste Liga club Wacker Innsbruck.

=== Go Ahead Eagles ===
On 21 June 2016, Ojamaa signed a two-year contract with Eredivisie club Go Ahead Eagles. He made his debut in the Eredivisie on 6 August 2016, starting in a 0–3 away loss to ADO Den Haag. Ojamaa scored in his second match, a 2–2 home draw against NAC Breda on 14 August 2016.

==== Dundee (loan) ====
On 31 January 2017, Ojamaa joined Scottish Premiership club Dundee on loan until the end of the 2016–17 season.

=== Gorica ===
On 21 October 2017, Ojamaa signed for Druga HNL club Gorica until the end of the 2017–18 season. He scored 6 goals in 19 games as Gorica won the league and promotion to the Prva HNL.

=== Miedź Legnica ===
On 21 June 2018, Ojamaa signed for Ekstraklasa club Miedź Legnica on a two-year deal, with an option to extend the contract for another year.

== International career ==
Ojamaa began his international career for Estonia with the under-17 national team. He was a part of the under-19 team that reached the 2009 UEFA European Under-19 Championship elite qualification round. Ojamaa also represented the under-21 team in the Under-21 Baltic Cup in 2008, and scored a hat-trick against Luxembourg in a 6–0 friendly win on 29 March 2011.

On 3 February 2012, Ojamaa received his first senior call-up by Tarmo Rüütli for a friendly against El Salvador. However the call-up was later dismissed by his club, Motherwell. He made his senior debut for Estonia on 25 May 2012, in a 1–3 loss to Croatia in a friendly. Ojamaa scored his first international goal on 30 May 2018, in a 2–0 win over Lithuania at the 2018 Baltic Cup.

== Personal life ==
Ojamaa has two brothers: Hindrek, the younger brother, is also a professional footballer, while Harri, the older brother, was forced to end his football career at the age of 19 due to an injury. Harri now works as an agent for Golden Star Management who also represent Henrik.

== Career statistics ==
=== Club ===
As of 24 May 2018.

Club	Season	League			National cup (Note: Includes Scottish Cup, Polish Cup, Norwegian Cup, FA Cup, KNVB Cup and Croatian Cup)		League cup (Note: Includes Scottish League Cup)		Europe		Other		Total	
Club	Season	Division	Apps	Goals	Apps	Goals	Apps	Goals	Apps	Goals	Apps	Goals	Apps	Goals
Flora II	2007	Esiliiga	7	1	0	0	—		—		—		7	1
Derby County	2009–10	Championship	0	0	0	0	0	0	—		—		0	0
Stafford Rangers (loan)	2009–10	Conference North	5	1	0	0	0	0	—		—		5	1
Alemannia Aachen II	2010–11	NRW-Liga	10	1	—		—		—		—		10	1
Alemannia Aachen	2010–11	2. Bundesliga	1	0	0	0	—		—		—		1	0
Fortuna Sittard (loan)	2010–11	Eerste Divisie	12	1	0	0	—		—		—		12	1
RoPS	2011	Veikkausliiga	17	2	0	0	0	0	—		—		17	2
Motherwell	2011–12	Scottish Premier League	18	7	3	2	0	0	—		—		21	9
Motherwell	2012–13	Scottish Premier League	37	4	2	0	1	0	4 (Note: Two appearances in UEFA Champions League, two appearances in UEFA Europa League)	0	—		44	4
Motherwell	Total		55	11	5	2	1	0	4	0	—		65	13
Legia Warsaw	2013–14	Ekstraklasa	33	2	2	0	—		9 (Note: Three appearances in UEFA Champions League, six appearances in UEFA Europa League)	0	—		44	2
Legia Warsaw	2014–15	Ekstraklasa	1	0	0	0	—		0	0	0	0	1	0
Legia Warsaw	Total		34	2	2	0	—		9	0	0	0	45	2
Motherwell (loan)	2014–15	Scottish Premiership	18	3	1	1	1	0	0	0	0	0	20	4
Sarpsborg 08 2 (loan)	2015	3. divisjon	2	1	—		—		—		—		2	1
Sarpsborg 08 (loan)	2015	Tippeligaen	10	0	4	2	—		—		—		14	2
Swindon Town	2015–16	League One	9	0	1	0	0	0	—		1 (Note: Appearance in Football League Trophy)	0	11	0
Wacker Innsbruck	2015–16	Erste Liga	16	2	0	0	—		—		—		16	2
Go Ahead Eagles	2016–17	Eredivisie	6	1	2	0	—		—		—		8	1
Dundee (loan)	2016–17	Scottish Premiership	14	0	0	0	0	0	—		—		14	0
Gorica	2017–18	Druga HNL	19	6	1	0	—		—		—		20	6
Career total			235	32	16	5	2	0	13	0	1	0	267	37

=== International ===
Appearances and goals by national team and year
National team	Year	Apps	Goals
Estonia
Estonia	2012	8	0
Estonia	2013	8	0
Estonia	2014	6	0
Estonia	2015	1	0
Estonia	2016	2	0
Estonia	2017	2	0
Estonia	2018	8	1
Estonia	2019	8	0
Estonia	2020	1	0
Estonia	2021	6	0
Estonia	2022	4	0
Estonia	2023	9	0
Total		63	1

Scores and results list Estonia's goal tally first, score column indicates score after each Ojamaa goal.

List of international goals scored by Henrik Ojamaa
No.	Date	Venue	Cap	Opponent	Score	Result	Competition
1	30 May 2018	Rakvere linnastaadion, Rakvere, Estonia	28	Lithuania	1–0	2–0	2018 Baltic Cup

== Honours ==
Legia Warsaw

- Ekstraklasa: 2013–14

Gorica

- Druga HNL: 2017–18

Flora

- Meistriliiga: 2022, 2023
- Estonian Supercup: 2021

Individual

- Estonian Young Footballer of the Year: 2012
- Meistriliiga Player of the Month: June-July 2025
