= Andres Oper =

Estonian footballer

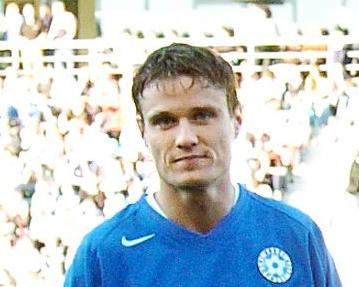
- Oper with Estonia in 2005

Personal information
- Date of birth: 7 November 1977 (age 49)
- Place of birth: Tallinn, then part of Estonian SSR, Soviet Union
- Height: 1.85 m (6 ft 1 in)
- Position: Forward

Team information
- Current team: Estonia U17 (head coach)

Youth career
- 1987–1993: LMSK/Pantrid
- 1994: Lelle
- 1994: Flora

Senior career*
Years	Team	Apps	(Gls)
1995–1999	Flora	73	(44)
1996	→ Tervis Pärnu (loan)	9	(3)
1999–2003	AaB	117	(28)
2003–2005	Torpedo Moscow	53	(8)
2005–2009	Roda JC	103	(32)
2009	Shanghai Shenhua	6	(0)
2010	ADO Den Haag	12	(1)
2010–2011	AEK Larnaca	21	(3)
2012–2013	Nea Salamina	42	(8)
2017–2022	Viimsi JK	27	(8)
2024	Viimsi JK	0	(0)
Total		463	(135)

International career
1995	Estonia U19	3	(1)
1995–1996	Estonia U21	4	(0)
1995–2014	Estonia	134	(38)

Managerial career
- 2015–2016: Accrington Stanley U16
- 2016–2019: Estonia (assistant)
- 2019–2021: Levadia (assistant)
- 2021–2023: Estonia (assistant)
- 2024–: Estonia U17
- * Club domestic league appearances and goals

Andres Oper (born 7 November 1977) is an Estonian football coach and former professional player. With 38 goals in 134 appearances, Oper is Estonia's all-time record goalscorer.

Oper played as a forward for Lelle, Flora, Tervis Pärnu, AaB, Torpedo Moscow, Roda JC, Shanghai Shenhua, ADO Den Haag, AEK Larnaca, Nea Salamina and the Estonia national team. Oper was named Estonian Footballer of the Year three times, in 1999, 2002 and 2005, and won the Estonian Silverball award twice; in 2001 and 2005.

== Early life ==
Oper was born in Tallinn. He graduated from the Tallinn Secondary School No. 37. He started playing football with Tallinna Jalgpallikool (English: Tallinn Football Academy) under Aivar Tiidus, before moving to Taivo Uibo's Uibo Poisid and then LMSK/Pantrid, coached by Aavo Sarap.

== Club career ==
=== Flora ===
In 1995, Oper signed for Flora. He won his first Meistriliiga title in the 1994–95 season. Oper soon became a first team regular and one of the team's leading goalscorers. He won two more league titles in the 1997–98 and the 1998 seasons, as well as the 1997–98 Estonian Cup and the 1998 Estonian Supercup. In 1998, Oper had a trial at Arsenal.

=== AaB ===
On 2 July 1999, Oper signed for Danish Superliga champions AaB, on a five-year contract for a transfer fee of $1 million (EEK 15 million). In the process, he became the first one million dollar transfer in Estonian top flight's history.

=== Torpedo Moscow ===
On 10 July 2003, Oper signed a two-year contract with Russian Premier League club Torpedo Moscow. Often inconsistent in Russia, scoring 8 goals in 53 appearances, Oper was placed on the transfer list after he suffered an injury to his right foot. In 2005, he was close to a transfer to Premier League's Sunderland in England, but the contract was never signed.

=== Roda JC ===
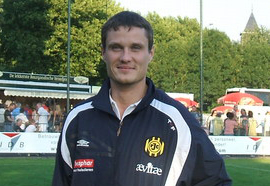
Oper with Roda JC in 2007

On 31 August 2005, Oper signed a one-year contract with Dutch Eredivisie club Roda JC for an undisclosed fee. He scored his first Eredivisie goal on 1 October 2005, in a 3–2 win against Vitesse Arnhem. Oper finished the 2005–06 Eredivisie season as the team's joint top scorer alongside Simon Cziommer with 8 goals and signed a contract extension for two more seasons. He was the team's top scorer in the 2006–07 Eredivisie season, scoring 12 goals in the league and 1 in the play-offs. On 16 May 2007, he signed another contract extension with Roda JC until summer 2009.

=== Shanghai Shenhua ===
On 19 July 2009, Oper signed a half-year contract with Chinese Super League club Shanghai Shenhua. He made his debut for the club on 2 August 2009, in an away match against Jiangsu Sainty. However, he suffered an injury and eventually terminated his contract with the club.

=== ADO Den Haag ===
After an unsuccessful spell in China, Oper returned to the Netherlands and on 21 January 2010, he signed a half-year contract with an option for another year with ADO Den Haag. He made his debut for the club on 13 February 2010 in a home match against Willem II. Oper scored his first goal for ADO Den Haag on 18 April 2010, in a 4–0 win against RKC Waalwijk. His contract extension stalled due to negotiations over personal terms, eventually no agreement was settled and the extension was cancelled. The contract expired in summer.

=== AEK Larnaca ===
On 9 September 2010, Oper signed a one-year contract with Cypriot First Division club AEK Larnaca. He scored on his debut against Ethnikos Achna.

=== Nea Salamina ===
In January 2012, Oper joined Cypriot First Division club Nea Salamina. He scored his first goal for the club on 3 March in a 2–0 win against Enosis Neon Paralimni.

In February 2014, Andres Oper announced his retirement from professional football. Since then, Oper has occasionally played for Viimsi JK in Estonian Cup or lower league matches. In 2021, he notably scored the winning goal in an Estonian Cup match against top flight club Pärnu Vaprus.

== International career ==
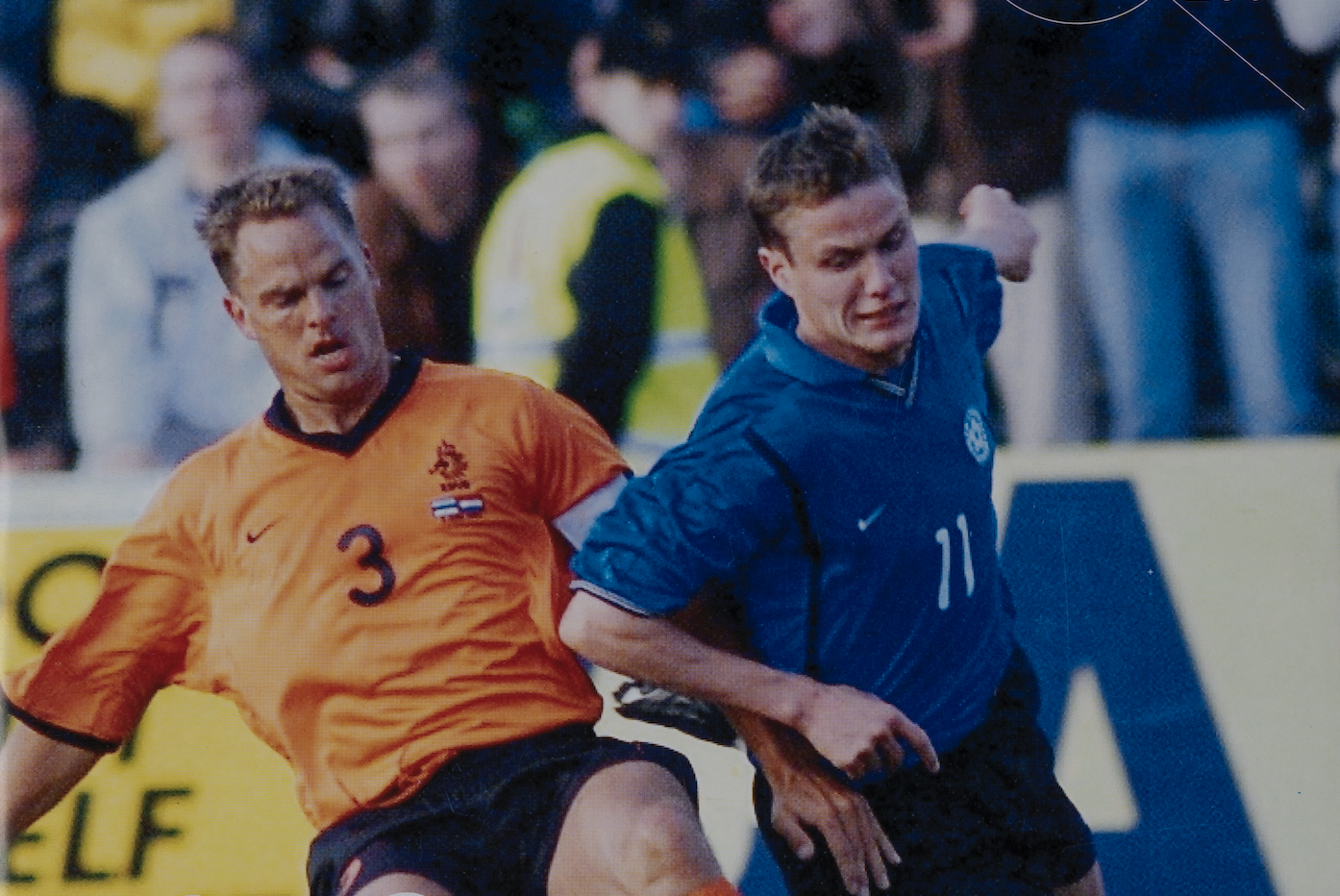
Oper in action against Frank de Boer in 2001

Oper made his international debut for the Estonia national football team on 19 May 1995, in a 0–2 1995 Baltic Cup defeat against Latvia. He scored his first goal for Estonia on 8 June 1997, in a 2–3 1998 FIFA World Cup qualification loss against Sweden. He won the Estonian Silverball award twice, in 2001 and 2005. On 2 September 2006, Oper played his 100th match for Estonia, a 0–1 UEFA Euro 2008 qualifying defeat against Israel. He ended his international career with a testimonial match on 26 May 2014, after a 1–1 friendly draw against Gibraltar at A. Le Coq Arena. With 38 goals in 134 international appearances, Oper is Estonia's all-time record goalscorer. He played for the Estonia national team for eighteen consecutive seasons.

== Career statistics ==
=== Club ===
Appearances and goals by club, season and competition
Club	Season	League			Cup		Continental		Other (Note: Includes the Estonian Supercup and Eredivisie play-offs)		Total	
Club	Season	Division	Apps	Goals	Apps	Goals	Apps	Goals	Apps	Goals	Apps	Goals
Flora	1994–95	Meistriliiga	1	0			0	0	0	0	1	0
Flora	1995–96	Meistriliiga	9	2			1	0	0	0	10	2
Flora	1996–97	Meistriliiga	18	13			2	0	0	0	20	13
Flora	1997–98	Meistriliiga	22	15			2	0	0	0	24	15
Flora	1998	Meistriliiga	13	10			2	1	1	0	16	11
Flora	1999	Meistriliiga	10	4			0	0	0	0	10	4
Flora	Total		73	44			7	1	1	0	81	45
Tervis Pärnu (loan)	1995–96	Meistriliiga	9	3			—		0	0	9	3
AaB	1999–2000	Superliga	30	7			4	1			34	8
AaB	2000–01	Superliga	29	6			4	0			33	6
AaB	2001–02	Superliga	31	4			—				31	4
AaB	2002–03	Superliga	27	11			—				27	11
AaB	Total		117	28			8	1			125	29
Torpedo Moscow	2003	Russian Premier League	14	3			5	2			19	5
Torpedo Moscow	2004	Russian Premier League	24	4			—				24	4
Torpedo Moscow	2005	Russian Premier League	15	1			—				15	1
Torpedo Moscow	Total		53	8			5	2			58	10
Roda JC	2005–06	Eredivisie	24	8	4	5	0	0	1	0	29	13
Roda JC	2006–07	Eredivisie	32	11	4	0	—		2	1	38	12
Roda JC	2007–08	Eredivisie	20	7	3	1	—		2	0	25	8
Roda JC	2008–09	Eredivisie	27	6	1	1	—		0	0	28	7
Roda JC	Total		103	32	12	7	0	0	5	1	120	40
Shanghai Shenhua	2009	Chinese Super League	6	0	—		0	0	0	0	6	0
ADO Den Haag	2009–10	Eredivisie	12	1	0	0	—		0	0	12	1
AEK Larnaca	2010–11	Cypriot First Division	21	3		2	—		0	0	21	5
Nea Salamina	2011–12	Cypriot First Division	14	3			—		0	0	14	3
Nea Salamina	2012–13	Cypriot First Division	28	5			—		0	0	28	5
Nea Salamina	Total		42	8	0	0	—		0	0	42	8
Career total			436	127	12	9	20	4	6	1	474	141

=== International ===
Appearances and goals by national team and year
National team	Year	Apps	Goals
Estonia	1995	3	0
Estonia	1996	5	0
Estonia	1997	14	2
Estonia	1998	13	2
Estonia	1999	13	5
Estonia	2000	9	6
Estonia	2001	11	2
Estonia	2002	8	4
Estonia	2003	6	2
Estonia	2004	7	2
Estonia	2005	9	5
Estonia	2006	4	2
Estonia	2007	6	1
Estonia	2008	4	2
Estonia	2009	2	0
Estonia	2010	4	1
Estonia	2011	2	0
Estonia	2012	10	2
Estonia	2013	3	0
Estonia	2014	1	0
Total		134	38

Scores and results list Estonia's goal tally first, score column indicates score after each Oper goal.

List of international goals scored by Andres Oper
No.	Date	Venue	Cap	Opponent	Score	Result	Competition
1	8 June 1997	Kadriorg Stadium, Tallinn, Estonia	16	Sweden	1–3	2–3	1998 FIFA World Cup qualification
2	22 June 1997	Kuressaare Linnastaadion, Kuressaare, Estonia	17	Andorra	3–0	4–1	Friendly
3	4 June 1998	Kadriorg Stadium, Tallinn, Estonia	25	Faroe Islands	4–0	5–0	UEFA Euro 2000 qualifying
4	22 June 1998	Kuressaare Linnastaadion, Kuressaare, Estonia	26	Andorra	2–1	2–1	Friendly
5	9 June 1999	Kadriorg Stadium, Tallinn, Estonia	41	Lithuania	1–0	1–2	UEFA Euro 2000 qualifying
6	9 October 1999	Kadriorg Stadium, Tallinn, Estonia	44	Bosnia and Herzegovina	1–0	1–4	UEFA Euro 2000 qualifying
7	1 November 1999	Mohammad bin Zayed Stadium, Abu Dhabi, United Arab Emirates	46	United Arab Emirates	2–1	2–2	Friendly
8	18 December 1999	Trikala Municipal Stadium, Trikala, Greece	48	Greece	1–1	2–2	Friendly
9	18 December 1999	Trikala Municipal Stadium, Trikala, Greece	48	Greece	2–1	2–2	Friendly
10	23 February 2000	Rajamangala National Stadium, Bangkok, Thailand	49	Finland	2–4	2–4	2000 King's Cup
11	26 April 2000	Stade Josy Barthel, Luxembourg City, Luxembourg	51	Luxembourg	1–0	1–1	Friendly
12	4 June 2000	Kadriorg Stadium, Tallinn, Estonia	52	Belarus	1–0	2–0	Friendly
13	4 June 2000	Kadriorg Stadium, Tallinn, Estonia	52	Belarus	2–0	2–0	Friendly
14	3 September 2000	Kadriorg Stadium, Tallinn, Estonia	55	Portugal	1–3	1–3	2002 FIFA World Cup qualification
15	7 October 2000	Estadi Comunal, Andorra la Vella, Andorra	56	Andorra	2–0	2–1	2002 FIFA World Cup qualification
16	19 March 2001	Cairo International Stadium, Cairo, Egypt	58	Egypt	1–1	3–3	Friendly
17	2 June 2001	A. Le Coq Arena, Tallinn, Estonia	61	Netherlands	1–0	2–4	2002 FIFA World Cup qualification
18	14 March 2002	Stadio Enzo Mazotti, Montecatini Terme, Italy	69	Saudi Arabia	2–0	2–0	Friendly
19	27 March 2002	A. Le Coq Arena, Tallinn, Estonia	70	Russia	1–0	2–1	Friendly
20	27 March 2002	A. Le Coq Arena, Tallinn, Estonia	70	Russia	2–1	2–1	Friendly
21	20 November 2002	A. Le Coq Arena, Tallinn, Estonia	76	Iceland	2–0	2–0	Friendly
22	29 March 2003	A. Le Coq Arena, Tallinn, Estonia	78	Canada	1–1	2–1	Friendly
23	29 March 2003	A. Le Coq Arena, Tallinn, Estonia	78	Canada	2–1	2–1	Friendly
24	4 September 2004	A. Le Coq Arena, Tallinn, Estonia	86	Luxembourg	3–0	4–0	2006 FIFA World Cup qualification
25	13 October 2004	Skonto Stadium, Riga, Latvia	88	Latvia	1–1	2–2	2006 FIFA World Cup qualification
26	26 March 2005	A. Le Coq Arena, Tallinn, Estonia	91	Slovakia	1–0	1–2	2006 FIFA World Cup qualification
27	4 June 2005	A. Le Coq Arena, Tallinn, Estonia	93	Liechtenstein	2–0	2–0	2006 FIFA World Cup qualification
28	3 September 2005	A. Le Coq Arena, Tallinn, Estonia	96	Latvia	1–0	2–1	2006 FIFA World Cup qualification
29	12 October 2005	Stade Josy Barthel, Luxembourg City, Luxembourg	98	Luxembourg	1–0	2–0	2006 FIFA World Cup qualification
30	12 October 2005	Stade Josy Barthel, Luxembourg City, Luxembourg	98	Luxembourg	2–0	2–0	2006 FIFA World Cup qualification
31	15 November 2006	A. Le Coq Arena, Tallinn, Estonia	102	Belarus	1–0	2–1	Friendly
32	15 November 2006	A. Le Coq Arena, Tallinn, Estonia	102	Belarus	2–1	2–1	Friendly
33	17 November 2007	Estadi Comunal, Andorra la Vella, Andorra	108	Andorra	1–0	2–0	UEFA Euro 2008 qualifying
34	20 August 2008	A. Le Coq Arena, Tallinn, Estonia	109	Malta	2–1	2–1	Friendly
35	6 September 2008	Stade Maurice Dufrasne, Liège, Belgium	110	Belgium	2–3	2–3	2010 FIFA World Cup qualification
36	21 May 2010	A. Le Coq Arena, Tallinn, Estonia	115	Finland	1–0	2–0	Friendly
37	1 June 2012	Tamme Stadium, Tartu, Estonia	123	Finland	1–2	1–2	2012 Baltic Cup
38	16 October 2012	Estadi Comunal, Andorra la Vella, Andorra	129	Andorra	1–0	1–0	2014 FIFA World Cup qualification

== Honours ==
Flora

- Meistriliiga: 1994–95, 1997–98, 1998
- Estonian Cup: 1997–98
- Estonian Supercup: 1998

Individual

- Estonian Footballer of the Year: 1999, 2002, 2005
- Estonian Silverball: 2001, 2005
