= Jürgen Henn =

Estonian football manager

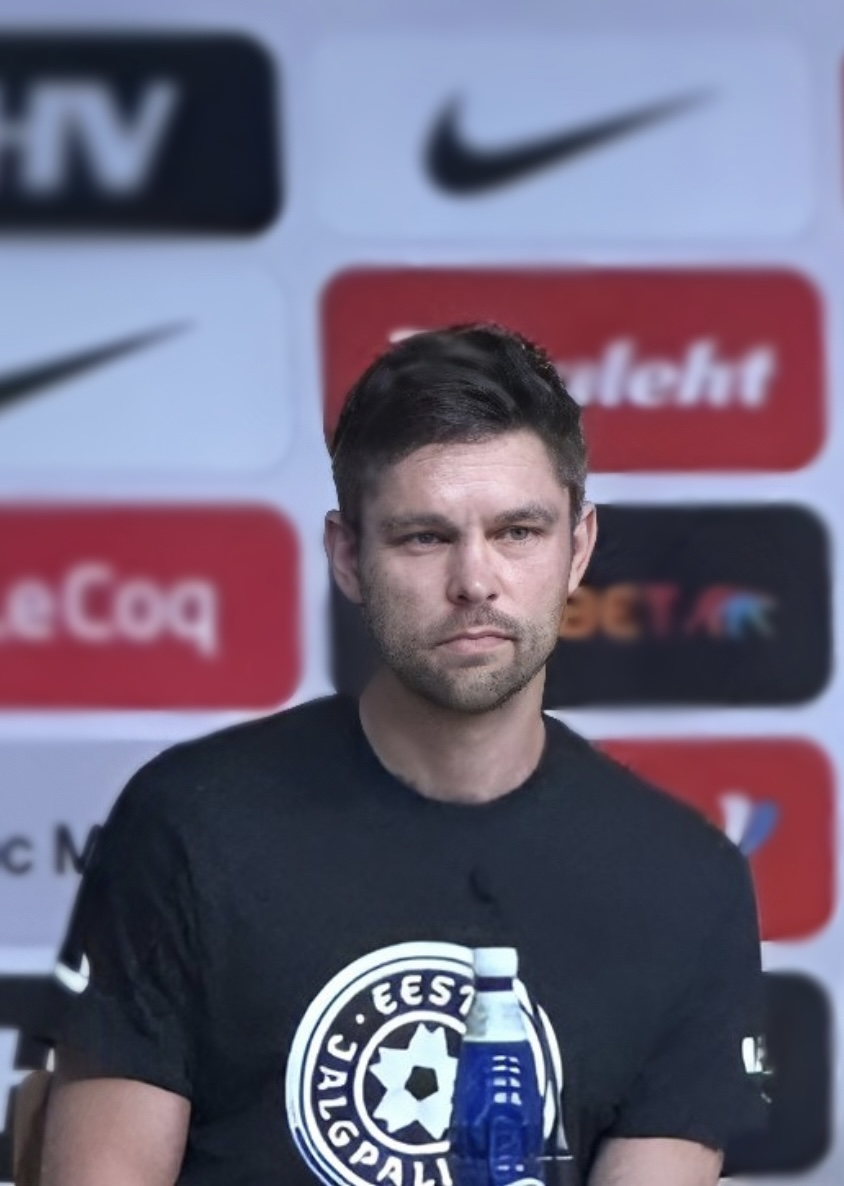
- Henn in 2024

Personal information
- Full name: Jürgen Henn
- Date of birth: 2 June 1987 (age 39)
- Place of birth: Viljandi, Estonia
- Height: 1.85 m (6 ft 1 in)
- Position: Midfielder

Team information
- Current team: Estonia (manager)

Youth career
- Tulevik

Senior career*
Years	Team	Apps	(Gls)
2004	Viljandi PT	16	(3)
2005	Elva	32	(3)
2006–2009	Tulevik II	31	(3)
2007–2008	Tulevik	58	(4)
2011	Flora II	9	(3)
2011	Flora	2	(0)
2012	Tulevik	15	(6)
2013–2014	HÜJK Emmaste	7	(1)

Managerial career
- 2012–2013: Flora III
- 2013–2018: Flora (assistant)
- 2014–2015: Flora II
- 2016: Estonia U21 (assistant)
- 2018–2023: Flora
- 2024–: Estonia
- * Club domestic league appearances and goals

Jürgen Henn (born 2 June 1987) is an Estonian professional football manager who is the current head coach of the Estonia national team.

Henn previously managed FC Flora from 2018 until 2023 and is the longest serving manager in the club's history. In 2021, he led Flora to become the first Estonian club to advance into the group stages of a UEFA tournament, as Flora qualified for the 2021–22 UEFA Europa Conference League with notably only Estonian players in the team. With an additional four Meistriliiga titles, one Estonian Cup and two Estonian Supercups, Henn is the most successful head coach in Flora's history.

== Managerial career ==
=== Flora ===
On 5 January 2018, Henn was appointed as the manager of Flora, having previously coached the club's reserve teams. He won the Meistriliiga in 2019 and 2020.

On 26 August 2021, Flora became the first Estonian club to advance to a UEFA tournament after beating Shamrock Rovers 5–2 on aggregate to qualify for the 2021–22 UEFA Europa Conference League.

Led by Henn, Flora won the 2022 Meistriliiga title by earning 97 points in 36 matches, thus repeating Levadia's 2009 record of most points in a Meistriliiga season.

In 2023, Jürgen Henn was linked with HJK Helsinki on multiple occasions. Flora lifted the club's 15th Estonian championship title in November 2023. Few weeks later, Jürgen Henn announced he will be stepping down after six years in charge, marking the end of the longest and most successful managerial tenure in Flora's history.

=== Estonia ===
Henn joined the Estonia national football team as assistant manager to Thomas Häberli in December 2023. On 15 May 2024, the Estonian Football Association announced that Henn would be taking over as head coach of the team in time for the 2024 Baltic Cup on June 8, 2024. Henn's contract runs until 2027 with an automatic extension clause if Estonia secures qualification for the 2028 European Championship qualifying round or the finals.

== Managerial statistics ==
As of 16 November 2026

Team	Nat	From	To	Record							
Team	Nat	From	To	P	W	D	L	GF	GA	GD	W%
Flora	(Estonia)	31 August 2018	4 December 2023	216	157	29	30	585	180	+405	72.7
Estonia	(Estonia)	5 June 2024	Present	28	9	8	11	28	39	−11	32.14
Total				244	166	37	41	613	219	+394	68.0

== Honours ==
=== Managerial ===
Flora

- Meistriliiga: 2019, 2020, 2022, 2023
- Estonian Cup: 2019–20
- Estonian Supercup: 2020, 2021

=== Individual ===
- Estonian Manager of the Year: 2019, 2020, 2021, 2022
- Meistriliiga Manager of the Month: May 2018, October 2018, March 2019, April 2019, September 2019, June 2020, July 2020, May 2021, November 2021, March 2022, April 2022, June/July 2022, May 2023
