= Mattias Käit =

Estonian footballer (born 1998)

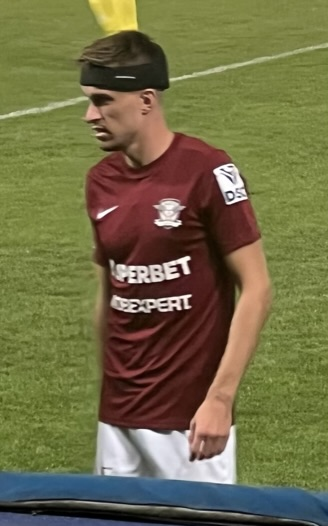
- Käit with Rapid București in 2022

Personal information
- Date of birth: 29 June 1998 (age 28)
- Place of birth: Tallinn, Estonia
- Height: 1.87 m (6 ft 2 in)
- Position: Midfielder

Team information
- Current team: Thun
- Number: 14

Youth career
- 2006–2014: Levadia
- 2014–2017: Fulham

Senior career*
Years	Team	Apps	(Gls)
2017–2019	Fulham	0	(0)
2018	→ Ross County (loan)	6	(0)
2019–2021	Domžale	42	(1)
2021	Bodø/Glimt	0	(0)
2022–2025	Rapid București	99	(6)
2025–	Thun	39	(2)

International career^{‡}
2012	Estonia U16	2	(0)
2013–2014	Estonia U17	16	(14)
2015	Estonia U19	2	(0)
2015–2016	Estonia U21	6	(1)
2016	Estonia U23	1	(2)
2016–	Estonia	72	(11)
- * Club domestic league appearances and goals as of 28 September 2026 ‡ National team caps and goals as of 16 November 2026

Mattias Käit (born 29 June 1998) is an Estonian professional footballer who plays as a midfielder for Swiss Super League club Thun and the Estonia national team.

== Club career ==
=== Fulham ===
Käit joined the Levadia youth academy in 2006, when Levadia and Kotkas Juunior merged. In July 2014, he joined Fulham academy. Käit signed his first professional contract with the club in July 2015. On 1 March 2017, he signed a contract extension which would keep him at Fulham until the summer of 2019.

==== Ross County (loan) ====
On 31 January 2018, Käit joined Scottish Premiership club Ross County on loan until the end of the season. He made his debut for the club on 3 February 2018, in a 4–1 away win over Dundee.

=== Domžale ===
On 16 June 2019, Käit signed a three-year contract with Slovenian PrvaLiga side Domžale. He made his debut for the club on 11 July 2019, in a 4–3 away win against Balzan in the first qualifying round of the UEFA Europa League. Käit left the club on 3 September 2021.

=== Bodø/Glimt ===
On 16 September 2021, Käit signed a contract with Norwegian champions Bodø/Glimt until the end of the year.

=== Rapid București ===
On 18 January 2022, Käit signed a two-and-a-half-year contract with Romanian club Rapid București until the summer of 2024.

=== FC Thun ===
On 15 July 2025, Käit parted ways with Rapid Bucureşti and signed a two-year deal with Swiss club FC Thun. He helped Thun win their first ever first division title, the 2025–26 Swiss Super League.

== International career ==
Käit has represented Estonia at under-16, under-17, under-19, under-21 and under-23 levels.

He made his senior international debut for Estonia on 6 January 2016, in a 1–1 draw against Sweden in a friendly. Käit scored his first two international goals for Estonia on 7 October 2016, in a 4–0 home victory over Gibraltar in a qualification match for the 2018 FIFA World Cup. On 3 September 2017, Käit scored the only goal of a home win over Cyprus in injury time. The goal later earned him the Estonian Silverball award for the best goal scored for the national team in 2017. He scored again in the successive qualifier on 7 October, a 6–0 away win over Gibraltar. Käit was Estonia's highest goalscorer in the qualification with four goals.

== Career statistics ==
=== Club ===
As of 2 May 2026

Appearances and goals by club, season and competition
Club	Season	League			National cup (Note: Includes Slovenian Football Cup, Norwegian Football Cup, Cupa României and Swiss Cup)		League cup		Continental		Total	
Club	Season	Division	Apps	Goals	Apps	Goals	Apps	Goals	Apps	Goals	Apps	Goals
Ross County (loan)	2017–18	Scottish Premiership	6	0	0	0	0	0	—		6	0
Domžale	2019–20	Slovenian PrvaLiga	15	1	1	0	—		4 (Note: Appearances in UEFA Europa League)	0	20	1
Domžale	2020–21	Slovenian PrvaLiga	22	0	4	0	—		0	0	26	0
Domžale	2021–22	Slovenian PrvaLiga	5	0	0	0	—		6 (Note: Appearances in UEFA Europa Conference League)	1	11	1
Domžale	Total		42	1	5	0	0	0	10	1	57	2
Bodø/Glimt	2021	Eliteserien	0	0	1	0	—		0	0	1	0
Rapid București	2021–22	Liga I	18	2	—		—		—		18	2
Rapid București	2022–23	Liga I	31	2	2	0	—		—		33	2
Rapid București	2023–24	Liga I	23	0	3	0	—		—		26	0
Rapid București	2024–25	Liga I	27	2	3	0	—		—		30	2
Rapid București	Total		99	6	8	0	—		—		107	6
Thun	2025–26	Swiss Super League	26	2	1	0	—		—		27	2
Career total			173	9	15	0	0	0	10	1	198	10

=== International ===
As of match played 16 November 2026

Appearances and goals by national team and year
National team	Year	Apps	Goals
Estonia	2016	2	2
Estonia	2017	10	2
Estonia	2018	4	1
Estonia	2019	10	0
Estonia	2020	5	0
Estonia	2021	8	3
Estonia	2022	6	0
Estonia	2023	9	0
Estonia	2024	2	0
Estonia	2025	8	3
Estonia	2026	8	0
Total		72	11

Scores and results list Estonia's goal tally first, score column indicates score after each Käit goal.

List of international goals scored by Mattias Käit
No.	Date	Venue	Cap	Opponent	Score	Result	Competition
1	7 October 2016	Lilleküla Stadium, Tallinn, Estonia	2	Gibraltar	1–0	4–0	2018 FIFA World Cup qualification
2	7 October 2016	Lilleküla Stadium, Tallinn, Estonia	2	Gibraltar	3–0	4–0	2018 FIFA World Cup qualification
3	3 September 2017	Lilleküla Stadium, Tallinn, Estonia	8	Cyprus	1–0	1–0	2018 FIFA World Cup qualification
4	7 October 2017	Estádio Algarve, Faro/Loulé, Portugal	9	Gibraltar	2–0	6–0	2018 FIFA World Cup qualification
5	30 May 2018	Rakvere linnastaadion, Rakvere, Estonia	15	Lithuania	2–0	2–0	2018 Baltic Cup
6	10 June 2021	Lilleküla Stadium, Tallinn, Estonia	34	Latvia	1–0	2–1	2020 Baltic Cup
7	10 June 2021	Lilleküla Stadium, Tallinn, Estonia	34	Latvia	2–0	2–1	2020 Baltic Cup
8	2 September 2021	Lilleküla Stadium, Tallinn, Estonia	35	Belgium	1–0	2–5	2022 FIFA World Cup qualification
9	25 March 2025	Stadionul Zimbru, Chișinău, Moldova	58	Moldova	3–1	3–2	2026 FIFA World Cup qualification
10	6 June 2025	Lilleküla Stadium, Tallinn, Estonia	59	Israel	1–0	1–3	2026 FIFA World Cup qualification
11	14 October 2025	Lilleküla Stadium, Tallinn, Estonia	64	Moldova	1–0	1–1	2026 FIFA World Cup qualification

== Honours ==
Bodø/Glimt

- Eliteserien: 2021

Thun

- Swiss Super League: 2025–26

Estonia

- Baltic Cup: 2020

Individual

- Estonian Young Footballer of the Year: 2016, 2017
- Estonian Silverball: 2017, 2021, 2025
