= Siim Luts =

Estonian footballer (born 1989)

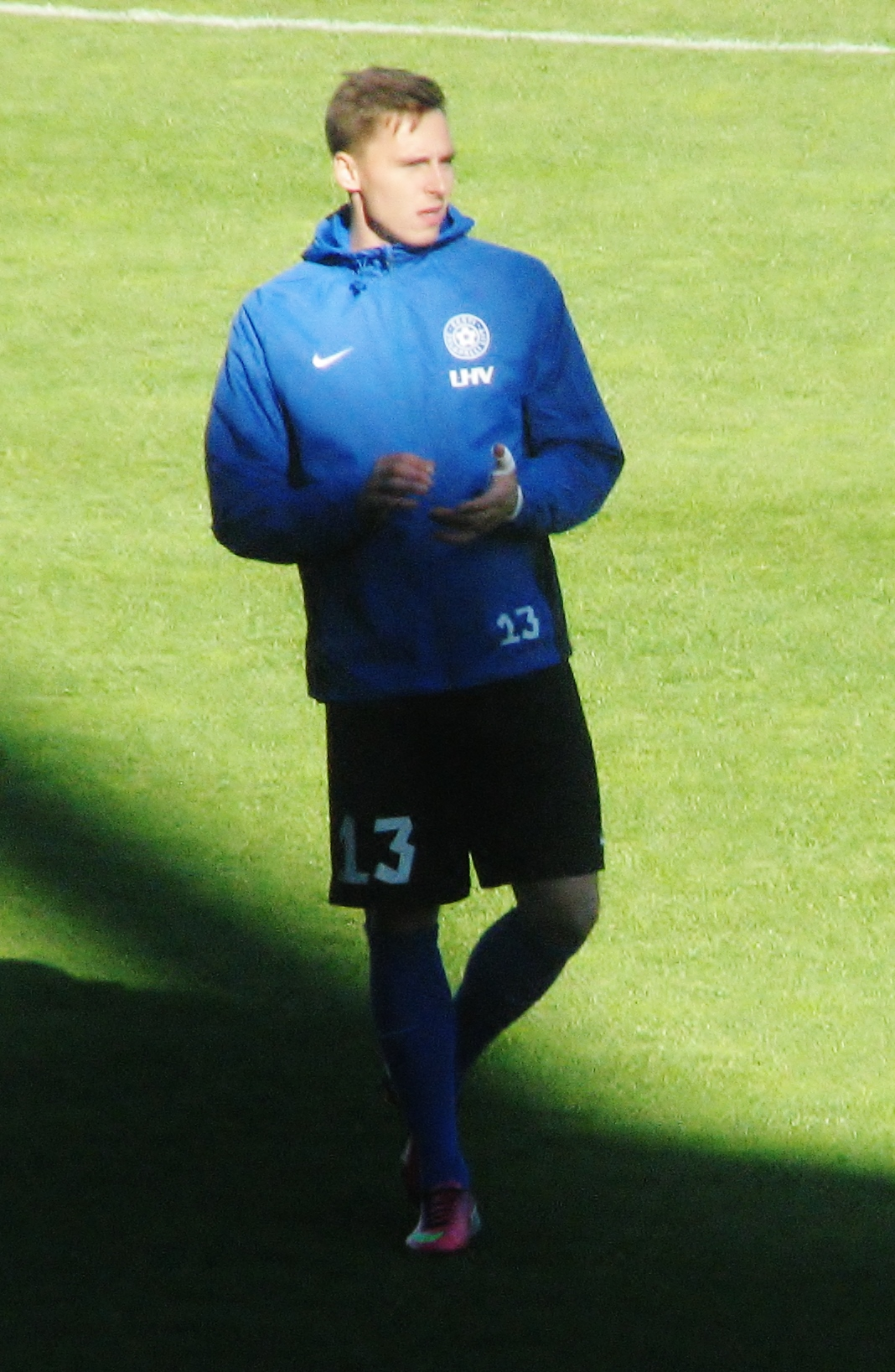
- Luts with Estonia in 2015

Personal information
- Full name: Siim Luts
- Date of birth: 12 March 1989 (age 37)
- Place of birth: Paide, then part of Estonian SSR, Soviet Union
- Height: 1.81 m (5 ft 11 1/2 in)
- Position: Winger

Team information
- Current team: Paide Linnameeskond
- Number: 19

Youth career
- 2002–2005: Flora

Senior career*
Years	Team	Apps	(Gls)
2005	Paide Flora	6	(4)
2006–2011	Flora II	84	(16)
2008–2012	Flora	88	(14)
2009	→ Tulevik (loan)	17	(5)
2013–2014	IFK Norrköping	13	(0)
2015–2016	Levadia	41	(14)
2016–2018	Bohemians 1905	34	(0)
2018–2019	Teplice	7	(0)
2019–	Paide Linnameeskond	182	(31)

International career^{‡}
2007	Estonia U19	7	(0)
2009–2010	Estonia U21	13	(0)
2010–2012	Estonia U23	3	(1)
2010–2020	Estonia	43	(4)
- * Club domestic league appearances and goals as of 17 November 2026 ‡ National team caps and goals as of 1 July 2022

Siim Luts (born 12 March 1989) is an Estonian professional footballer who plays as a left winger for Paide Linnameeskond.

== Club career ==
=== Flora ===
Luts began playing football at Flora youth academy in Paide. He made his Flora – and Meistriliiga – debut on 4 October 2008, coming on as a 72nd-minute substitute for Sergei Mošnikov in a 1–1 draw against Tallinna Kalev at A. Le Coq Arena. Luts scored his first Meistriliiga goal on 1 November 2008, in a 4–2 home win over TVMK. In July 2009, he joined Tulevik on loan until the end of the season.

Luts became a regular starter for Flora in the 2010 season, in which he scored 6 goals in 31 games and won his first Meistriliiga title. He won his second Meistriliiga title in the 2011 season.

=== IFK Norrköping ===
On 22 January 2013, Luts signed a two-year contract with Allsvenskan club IFK Norrköping. On 4 April 2013, his missed penalty in the shoout-out against Djurgårdens IF saw IFK Norrköping eliminated in the quarter-finals of the 2012–13 Svenska Cupen. Luts made his debut in the Allsvenskan on 8 April 2013, in a 2–1 home victory over Gefle IF. He made 13 league appearances in the 2013 season. After missing first half of the season due to injury, Luts was released by the club in June 2014.

=== Levadia ===
On 16 January 2015, Luts signed a one-year contract with Meistriliiga club Levadia. He made his debut for Levadia on 3 March 2015, against Santos in the Estonian Supercup, winning the match 5–0.

=== Bohemians 1905 ===
On 25 July 2016, Luts signed a two-year contract with Czech First League club Bohemians 1905. He made his debut in the Czech First League on 31 July 2016, in a 0–3 home loss to Hradec Králové.

=== Teplice ===
On 23 May 2018, it was announced that Luts would join Czech First League club Teplice after the 2017–18 season on a two-year deal.

=== Paide Linnameeskond ===
On 19 July 2019, Luts signed a two-and-a-half-year contract with Paide Linnameeskond.

== International career ==
Luts began his youth career in 2007 with the Estonia under-19 team. He also represented the under-21, and under-23 national sides.

Luts made his senior international debut for Estonia on 17 November 2010, replacing Tarmo Kink in the 76th minute of a 1–1 home draw against Liechtenstein in a friendly. His first goal for Estonia on 7 June 2014, in a 2–1 friendly victory over Tajikistan, brought him the Estonian Silverball award for the best goal scored for the national team in 2014.

On 28 March 2017, Luts scored his second international goal after just 58 seconds in a 3–0 friendly victory over Croatia.

== Career statistics ==
=== Club ===
As of 28 May 2018.

Appearances and goals by club, season and competition
Club	Season	League			Cup (Note: Includes the Estonian Cup, Svenska Cupen and Czech Cup)		Europe		Other		Total	
Club	Season	Division	Apps	Goals	Apps	Goals	Apps	Goals	Apps	Goals	Apps	Goals
Flora Paide	2005	IV liiga	6	4	—		—		0	0	6	4
Flora II	2006	Esiliiga	27	8	1	1	—		—		28	9
Flora II	2007	Esiliiga	21	4	1	0	—		—		22	4
Flora II	2008	Esiliiga	26	4	3	1	—		—		29	5
Flora II	2009	Esiliiga	6	0	0	0	—		—		6	0
Flora II	2010	Esiliiga	3	0	0	0	—		—		3	0
Flora II	2011	Esiliiga	1	0	0	0	—		—		1	0
Flora II	Total		84	16	5	2	—		—		89	18
Flora	2008	Meistriliiga	4	1	0	0	0	0	2 (Note: Appearances in Baltic League)	0	6	1
Flora	2009	Meistriliiga	8	1	1	0	0	0	1 (Note: Appearance in Estonian Supercup)	0	10	1
Flora	2010	Meistriliiga	31	6	4	2	2 (Note: Appearances in UEFA Europa League)	0	6 (Note: One appearance in Estonian Supercup, five appearances in Baltic League)	0	43	8
Flora	2011	Meistriliiga	19	3	3	1	2 (Note: Appearances in UEFA Champions League)	0	5 (Note: Two appearances in Baltic Champions Cup, one appearance in Estonian Supercup, two appearances in Baltic League)	0	29	4
Flora	2012	Meistriliiga	26	3	4	1	2	0	1	1	33	5
Flora	Total		88	14	12	4	6	0	15	1	121	19
Tulevik (loan)	2009	Meistriliiga	17	5	3	0	—		—		20	5
IFK Norrköping	2013	Allsvenskan	13	0	5	0	—		—		18	0
IFK Norrköping	2014	Allsvenskan	0	0	0	0	—		—		0	0
IFK Norrköping	Total		13	0	5	0	—		—		18	0
Levadia	2015	Meistriliiga	28	11	2	0	2	1	1	0	33	12
Levadia	2016	Meistriliiga	13	3	0	0	4	0	—		17	3
Levadia	Total		41	14	2	0	6	1	1	0	50	15
Bohemians 1905	2016–17	Czech First League	23	0	3	0	—		—		26	0
Bohemians 1905	2017–18	Czech First League	11	0	1	1	—		—		12	1
Bohemians 1905	Total		34	0	4	1	—		—		38	1
Career total			283	53	31	7	12	1	16	1	342	62

=== International ===
As of 12 October 2020.

Appearances and goals by national team and year
National team	Year	Apps	Goals
Estonia
Estonia	2010	2	0
Estonia	2011	2	0
Estonia	2012	4	0
Estonia	2013	7	0
Estonia	2014	5	1
Estonia	2015	4	0
Estonia	2016	3	0
Estonia	2017	6	2
Estonia	2018	8	1
Estonia	2019	0	0
Estonia	2020	2	0
Total		43	4

=== International goals ===
As of 15 October 2018. Estonia score listed first, score column indicates score after each Luts goal.

International goals by date, venue, cap, opponent, score, result and competition
No.	Date	Venue	Cap	Opponent	Score	Result	Competition
1	7 June 2014	A. Le Coq Arena, Tallinn, Estonia	20	Tajikistan	1–1	2–1	Friendly
2	28 March 2017	A. Le Coq Arena, Tallinn, Estonia	29	Croatia	1–0	3–0	Friendly
3	7 October 2017	Estádio Algarve, Faro/Loulé, Portugal	32	Gibraltar	1–0	6–0	2018 FIFA World Cup qualification
4	15 October 2018	A. Le Coq Arena, Tallinn, Estonia	39	Hungary	1–0	3–3	2018–19 UEFA Nations League C

== Honours ==
=== Club ===
Flora

- Meistriliiga: 2010, 2011
- Estonian Cup: 2010–11
- Estonian Supercup: 2009, 2011, 2012

Levadia

- Estonian Supercup: 2015

=== Individual ===
- Estonian Silverball: 2014, 2018
- Meistriliiga Player of the Month: July 2015, September 2015
