= Konstantin Vassiljev =

Estonian footballer (born 1984)

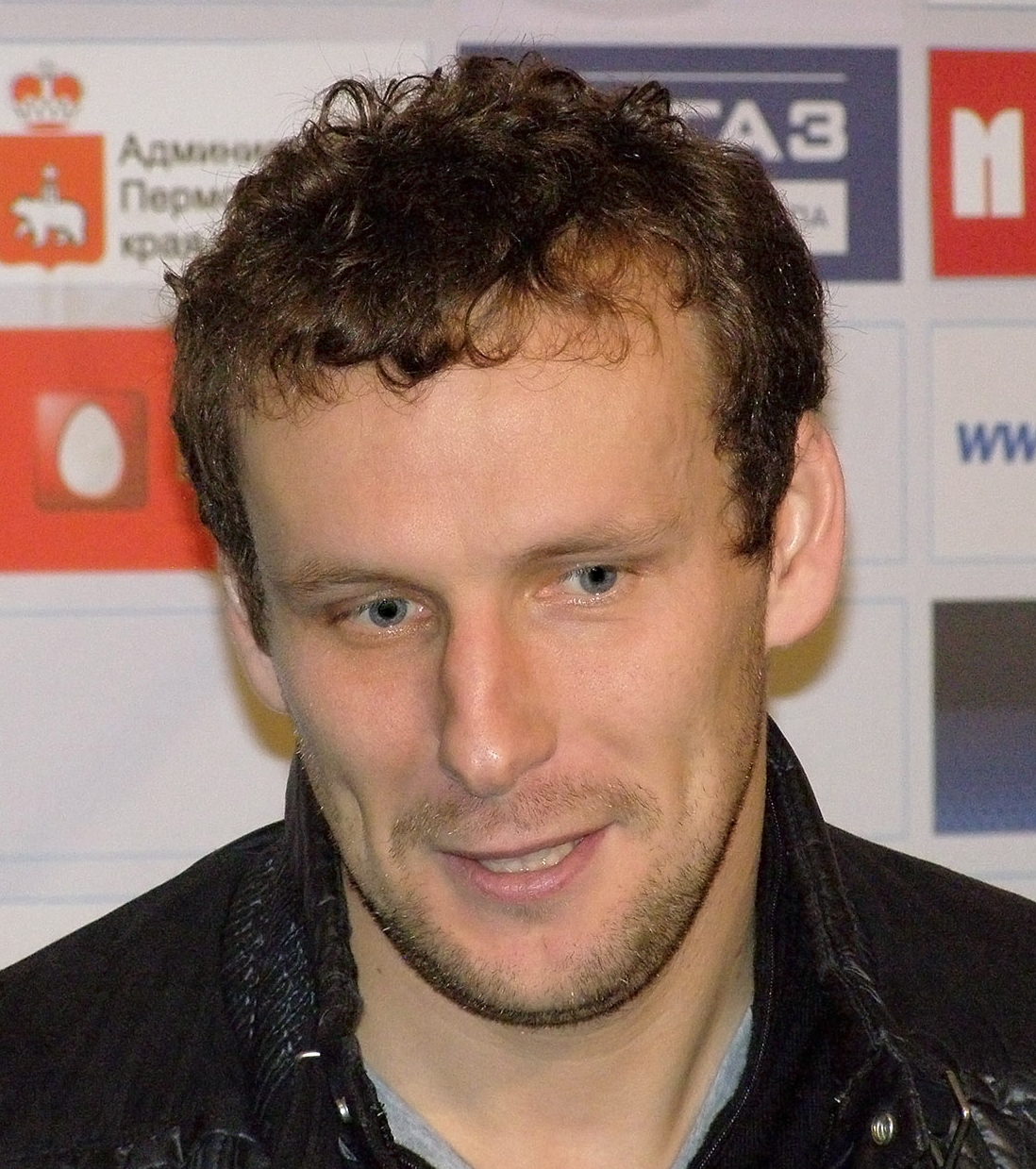
- Vassiljev in 2013

Personal information
- Date of birth: 16 August 1984 (age 42)
- Place of birth: Tallinn, then part of Estonian SSR, Soviet Union
- Height: 1.75 m (5 ft 9 in)
- Position: Attacking midfielder

Team information
- Current team: Flora (head coach)

Youth career
- TJK

Senior career*
Years	Team	Apps	(Gls)
2000–2001	TJK-83 Tallinn	37	(20)
2001	HÜJK Emmaste	4	(0)
2002	TJK	24	(10)
2003–2007	Levadia	123	(50)
2003	Levadia III	1	(0)
2006–2007	Levadia II	2	(3)
2008–2011	Nafta Lendava	102	(13)
2011	Koper	22	(3)
2011–2014	Amkar Perm	63	(4)
2014–2015	Piast Gliwice	25	(5)
2015–2017	Jagiellonia Białystok	67	(20)
2017–2019	Piast Gliwice	23	(1)
2019–2024	Flora	159	(56)
Total		652	(185)

International career
2002	Estonia U19 (Note: Official competitive UEFA matches only)	3	(1)
2003–2006	Estonia U21	11	(3)
2006–2025	Estonia	159	(26)

Managerial career
- 2024–: Flora
- * Club domestic league appearances and goals

Konstantin Vassiljev (born 16 August 1984) is an Estonian professional football manager and former player who is the manager of Estonian Meistriliiga club Flora.

With 159 caps, Vassiljev is the Estonia national team's most-capped player, having surpassed Martin Reim's 157 in his last national team match against Switzerland on 4 June 2024. He is also the third-highest goalscorer for Estonia with 26 goals. Vassiljev has been named Estonian Footballer of the Year three times, and has won the Estonian Silverball award a record six times.

== Club career ==
=== TJK ===
Vassiljev began playing football at TJK youth academy. He made his senior league debut in the III liiga with TJK-83 Tallinn.

=== Levadia ===
In January 2003, Vassiljev signed for Meistriliiga club Levadia. He made his debut in the Meistriliiga on 15 March 2003, playing for Levadia's Tallinn-based team against the Maardu-based Levadia team in a 1–0 loss. Vassiljev scored his first Meistriliiga goal on 13 May 2003, in a 9–3 away victory over Kuressaare. After the 2003 season, the Maardu team moved to Tallinn, while the Tallinn team became their new reserve team in the Esiliiga. He won his first Meistriliiga title in the 2004 season. Vassiljev captained Levadia during the 2006 season. He won two more Meistriliiga titles, in 2006 and 2007.

=== Nafta Lendava ===
In February 2008, Vassiljev signed for Slovenian PrvaLiga club Nafta Lendava. He made his debut in the PrvaLiga on 2 March 2008, in a 2–0 away loss to Celje. Vassiljev scored his first goal for Nafta Lendava on 16 March 2008, in a 2–1 away defeat to Drava Ptuj.

=== Koper ===
On 31 January 2011, Vassiljev signed a two-and-a-half-year contract with PrvaLiga champions Koper. He scored his first goal for Koper on 2 April 2011 in a 3–0 home victory over Maribor.

=== Amkar Perm ===
On 29 August 2011, Vassiljev signed a three-year contract with Russian Premier League club Amkar Perm for a fee reported to be around €1 million. He made his debut in the Russian Premier League on 11 September 2011, against Spartak Moscow, but had to be substituted after 44 minutes due to injury. The match ended in a 1–0 loss. Vassiljev scored his first goal for Amkar Perm on 20 August 2012, from a penalty in a 2–0 win over Krylia Sovetov Samara.

=== Piast Gliwice ===
On 26 August 2014, Vassiljev signed a one-year contract with Ekstraklasa club Piast Gliwice. He made his debut three days later, against Zawisza Bydgoszcz, coming on as a half-time substitute for Carles Martínez, but had to be substituted after sustaining a knee injury in the 3–0 home win. Vassiljev scored his first goal for Piast Gliwice on 29 October 2014, in a 5–0 home victory over GKS Bełchatów in a Polish Cup match. On 3 November 2014, he scored his first Ekstraklasa goal, in a 4–2 victory over Podbeskidzie Bielsko-Biała.

=== Jagiellonia Białystok ===
On 18 June 2015, Vassiljev signed a two-year contract with Ekstraklasa club Jagiellonia Białystok. He made his first appearance for the club on 2 July 2015, starting in the 1–0 first leg victory of their UEFA Europa League qualification round against Kruoja Pakruojis. Vassiljev scored 13 goals in the 2016–17 season, and was also the league's top assist provider with 13, while Jagiellonia Białystok finished the season as runners up.

=== Return to Piast Gliwice ===
On 3 July 2017, Vassiljev signed a three-year contract with his former club Piast Gliwice.

=== Flora ===
On 27 February 2019, Vassiljev returned to Estonia after 11 years abroad, signing a one-year contract with Flora. He made his debut for the club on 10 March 2019 in a 2–0 win over Tulevik. Flora won the 2019 Meistriliiga with Vassiljev scoring 12 goals.

At the end of the season Vassiljev signed another one-year contract. Flora won all three Estonian cups in the season – 2020 Meistriliiga, 2019–20 Estonian Cup and 2020 Estonian Supercup. They also reached the 2020–21 UEFA Europa League play-off round. At the end of the season he extended the contract for a third season with the club.

== International career ==
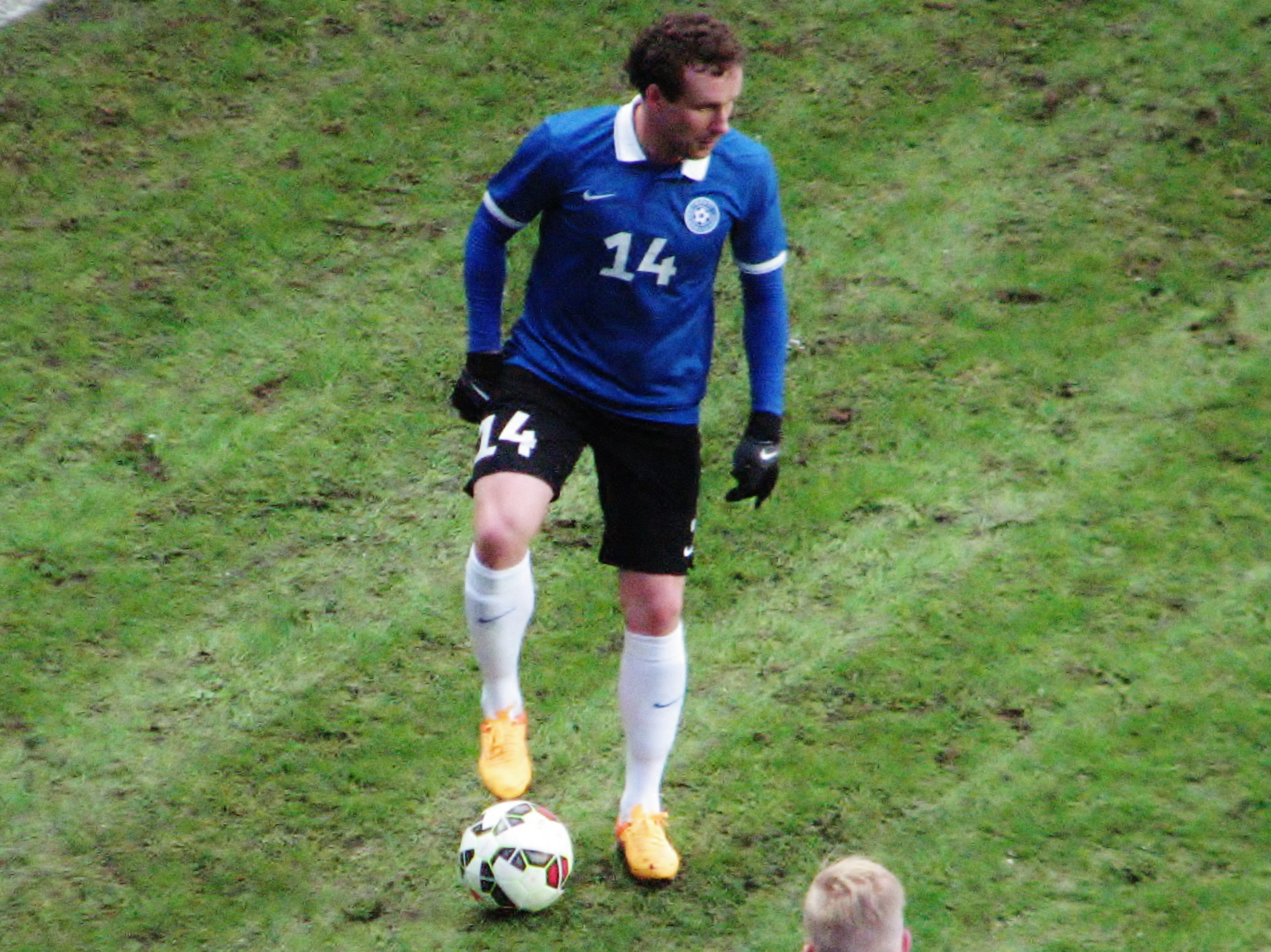
Vassiljev playing in a friendly against Iceland on 31 March 2015

Vassiljev began his youth career in 2002 with the Estonia under-19 team. He has also represented the under-21 national side.

Vassiljev made his senior international debut for Estonia on 31 May 2006, in a 1–1 home draw against New Zealand in a friendly. He scored his first international goal for Estonia on 28 March 2009, in a 2–2 away draw against Armenia in a qualification match for the 2010 FIFA World Cup. Vassiljev soon developed into a prolific goalscorer for the national team, capable of finishing well from distance with an accurate and powerful shot. He made his 100th appearance for Estonia on 24 March 2018, in a 0–0 away draw against Armenia in a friendly. Vassiljev has been named Estonian Footballer of the Year three times, in 2010, 2011 and 2013, and has won the Estonian Silverball award a record six times, in 2009, 2011, 2012, 2013, 2016, and 2019.

== Career statistics ==
=== Club ===
As of 24 May 2018

Appearances and goals by club, season and competition
Club	Season	League			National cup (Note: Includes Estonian Cup, Slovenian Cup, Russian Cup and Polish Cup)		Continental		Other		Total	
Club	Season	Division	Apps	Goals	Apps	Goals	Apps	Goals	Apps	Goals	Apps	Goals
TJK-83 Tallinn	2000	III liiga	18	13	—		—		—		18	13
TJK-83 Tallinn	2001	II liiga	19	7	—		—		—		19	7
TJK-83 Tallinn	Total		37	20	—		—		—		37	20
HÜJK Emmaste	2001	Esiliiga	4	0	0	0	—		—		4	0
TJK	2002	Esiliiga	24	10	1	0	—		—		25	10
Levadia	2003	Meistriliiga	24	9	5	2	—		—		29	11
Levadia	2004	Meistriliiga	23	9	6	4	3 (Note: Appearances in UEFA Cup)	1	1 (Note: Appearance in Estonian Supercup)	0	33	14
Levadia	2005	Meistriliiga	31	8	4	3	2 (Note: Appearances in UEFA Champions League)	0	5 (Note: One appearance in Livonia Cup, three appearances in Commonwealth Cup, one appearance in Estonian Supercup)	0	42	11
Levadia	2006	Meistriliiga	29	18	2	2	6	0	—		37	20
Levadia	2007	Meistriliiga	16	6	4	1	1	0	5 (Note: Three appearances and one goal in Commonwealth Cup, two appearances in Baltic League)	1	26	8
Levadia	Total		123	50	21	12	12	1	11	1	167	64
Levadia III	2003	II liiga	1	0	—		—		—		1	0
Levadia II	2006	Esiliiga	1	1	—		—		—		1	1
Levadia II	2007	Esiliiga	1	2	—		—		—		1	2
Levadia II	Total		2	3	—		—		—		2	3
Nafta Lendava	2007–08	Slovenian PrvaLiga	15	1	0	0	—		—		15	1
Nafta Lendava	2008–09	Slovenian PrvaLiga	35	5	1	0	—		—		36	5
Nafta Lendava	2009–10	Slovenian PrvaLiga	33	4	3	0	—		—		36	4
Nafta Lendava	2010–11	Slovenian PrvaLiga	19	3	4	2	—		—		23	5
Nafta Lendava	Total		102	13	8	2	—		—		110	15
Koper	2010–11	Slovenian PrvaLiga	16	3	2	0	0	0	0	0	18	3
Koper	2011–12	Slovenian PrvaLiga	6	0	0	0	2 (Note: Appearances in UEFA Europa League)	0	—		8	0
Koper	Total		22	3	2	0	2	0	0	0	26	3
Amkar Perm	2011–12	Russian Premier League	17	0	0	0	—		—		17	0
Amkar Perm	2012–13	Russian Premier League	27	2	0	0	—		—		27	2
Amkar Perm	2013–14	Russian Premier League	19	2	1	0	—		—		20	2
Amkar Perm	Total		63	4	1	0	—		—		64	4
Piast Gliwice	2014–15	Ekstraklasa	25	5	3	1	—		—		28	6
Jagiellonia Białystok	2015–16	Ekstraklasa	35	7	2	0	3	0	—		40	7
Jagiellonia Białystok	2016–17	Ekstraklasa	32	13	1	0	—		—		33	13
Jagiellonia Białystok	Total		67	20	3	0	3	0	—		73	20
Piast Gliwice	2017–18	Ekstraklasa	23	1	1	0	—		—		24	1
Career total			493	129	40	15	17	1	11	1	561	146

=== International ===
Appearances and goals by national team and year
National team	Year	Apps	Goals
Estonia
Estonia	2006	2	0
Estonia	2007	4	0
Estonia	2008	8	0
Estonia	2009	13	3
Estonia	2010	11	4
Estonia	2011	10	6
Estonia	2012	10	2
Estonia	2013	9	2
Estonia	2014	8	1
Estonia	2015	10	3
Estonia	2016	8	1
Estonia	2017	6	1
Estonia	2018	10	0
Estonia	2019	10	2
Estonia	2020	6	0
Estonia	2021	12	0
Estonia	2022	9	1
Estonia	2023	9	0
Estonia	2024	3	0
Estonia	2025	1	0
Total		159	26

Scores and results list Estonia's goal tally first, score column indicates score after each Vassiljev goal.

List of international goals scored by Konstantin Vassiljev
No.	Date	Venue	Cap	Opponent	Score	Result	Competition
1	28 March 2009	Republican Stadium, Yerevan, Armenia	16	Armenia	1–1	2–2	2010 FIFA World Cup qualification
2	5 September 2009	Kadir Has Stadium, Kayseri, Turkey	22	Turkey	2–2	2–4	2010 FIFA World Cup qualification
3	14 October 2009	A. Le Coq Arena, Tallinn, Estonia	25	Belgium	2–0	2–0	2010 FIFA World Cup qualification
4	7 September 2010	A. Le Coq Arena, Tallinn, Estonia	35	Uzbekistan	2–2	3–3	Friendly
5	7 September 2010	A. Le Coq Arena, Tallinn, Estonia	35	Uzbekistan	3–2	3–3	Friendly
6	8 October 2010	Red Star Stadium, Belgrade, Serbia	36	Serbia	2–1	3–1	UEFA Euro 2012 qualification
7	17 November 2010	A. Le Coq Arena, Tallinn, Estonia	38	Liechtenstein	1–1	1–1	Friendly
8	25 March 2011	A. Le Coq Arena, Tallinn, Estonia	39	Uruguay	1–0	2–0	Friendly
9	29 March 2011	A. Le Coq Arena, Tallinn, Estonia	40	Serbia	1–1	1–1	UEFA Euro 2012 qualification
10	2 September 2011	Stožice Stadium, Ljubljana, Slovenia	43	Slovenia	1–0	2–1	UEFA Euro 2012 qualification
11	7 October 2011	Windsor Park, Belfast, Northern Ireland	45	Northern Ireland	1–1	2–1	UEFA Euro 2012 qualification
12	7 October 2011	Windsor Park, Belfast, Northern Ireland	45	Northern Ireland	2–1	2–1	UEFA Euro 2012 qualification
13	15 November 2011	Aviva Stadium, Dublin, Republic of Ireland	48	Republic of Ireland	1–1	1–1	UEFA Euro 2012 qualifying play-offs
14	25 May 2012	Stadion Aldo Drosina, Pula, Croatia	49	Croatia	1–3	1–3	Friendly
15	15 August 2012	A. Le Coq Arena, Tallinn, Estonia	53	Poland	1–0	1–0	Friendly
16	6 September 2013	A. Le Coq Arena, Tallinn, Estonia	64	Netherlands	1–1	2–2	2014 FIFA World Cup qualification
17	6 September 2013	A. Le Coq Arena, Tallinn, Estonia	64	Netherlands	2–1	2–2	2014 FIFA World Cup qualification
18	12 November 2014	Ullevaal Stadion, Oslo, Norway	74	Norway	1–0	1–0	Friendly
19	31 March 2015	A. Le Coq Arena, Tallinn, Estonia	77	Iceland	1–1	1–1	Friendly
20	5 September 2015	A. Le Coq Arena, Tallinn, Estonia	80	Lithuania	1–0	1–0	UEFA Euro 2016 qualification
21	17 November 2015	A. Le Coq Arena, Tallinn, Estonia	85	Saint Kitts and Nevis	2–0	3–0	Friendly
22	7 October 2016	A. Le Coq Arena, Tallinn, Estonia	91	Gibraltar	2–0	4–0	2018 FIFA World Cup qualification
23	28 March 2017	A. Le Coq Arena, Tallinn, Estonia	95	Croatia	2–0	3–0	Friendly
24	26 March 2019	Victoria Stadium, Gibraltar	112	Gibraltar	1–0	1–0	Friendly
25	8 June 2019	A. Le Coq Arena, Tallinn, Estonia	113	Northern Ireland	1–0	1–2	UEFA Euro 2020 qualification
26	9 June 2022	National Stadium, Ta' Qali, Malta	142	Malta	1–0	2–1	2022–23 UEFA Nations League D

== Honours ==
Levadia

- Meistriliiga: 2004, 2006, 2007
- Estonian Cup: 2003–04, 2004–05, 2006–07

Flora

- Meistriliiga: 2019, 2020, 2022, 2023
- Estonian Cup: 2019–20
- Estonian Supercup: 2020, 2021

Individual

- Estonian Footballer of the Year: 2010, 2011, 2013
- Estonian Silverball: 2009, 2011, 2012, 2013, 2016, 2019
- Ekstraklasa Player of the Month: July 2016, October 2016
- Piłka Nożna Foreigner of the Year: 2016
- Meistriliiga Player of the Year: 2022
- Meistriliiga Midfielder of the Year: 2022
- Meistriliiga Player of the Month: March 2022, September 2022, October 2023

Orders

- Order of the White Star, 4th Class

== See also ==
- List of men's footballers with 100 or more international caps
