= Ragnar Klavan =

Estonian footballer (born 1985)

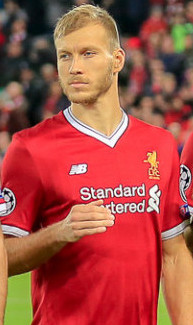
- Klavan lining up for Liverpool in 2017

Personal information
- Full name: Ragnar Klavan
- Date of birth: 30 October 1985 (age 41)
- Place of birth: Viljandi, then part of Estonian SSR, Soviet Union
- Height: 1.87 m (6 ft 2 in)
- Position: Centre-back

Youth career
- Tulevik

Senior career*
Years	Team	Apps	(Gls)
2001–2002	Elva	31	(11)
2002–2003	Tulevik	28	(2)
2003–2005	Flora	28	(2)
2004–2005	→ Vålerenga (loan)	2	(0)
2005–2009	Heracles Almelo	95	(4)
2009	→ AZ (loan)	12	(0)
2009–2012	AZ	66	(0)
2012–2016	FC Augsburg	125	(4)
2016–2018	Liverpool	39	(1)
2018–2021	Cagliari	61	(0)
2021–2022	Paide Linnameeskond	21	(3)
2023–2024	Tallinna Kalev	22	(1)
Total		530	(28)

International career
1999	Estonia U15	4	(0)
2001	Estonia U17	9	(0)
2002	Estonia U18	1	(0)
2003	Estonia U20	1	(0)
2002–2006	Estonia U21	7	(0)
2003–2024	Estonia	130	(3)
- * Club domestic league appearances and goals

Ragnar Klavan (born 30 October 1985) is an Estonian former professional footballer who played as a defender. He is regarded as one of the greatest Estonian footballers of all time. A left-footed centre back, he also played as a left back during his career.

Klavan played for Elva, Tulevik and Flora in Estonia, winning the Meistriliiga with Flora in the 2003 season, before moving to the Netherlands where he played for Heracles Almelo and AZ, winning the Eredivisie with the latter in the 2008–09 season. In 2012, he transferred to FC Augsburg and spent four seasons in the Bundesliga before his move to Liverpool in 2016 for €5 million. In 2018, Klavan signed for Serie A's Cagliari in a transfer worth £2 million. In 2021, he returned to Estonia signing for Paide Linnameeskond and retired from football with Tallinna Kalev in 2024.

Klavan made his senior international debut for Estonia in 2003, and became captain in 2012. In 2015, he became the ninth player to make 100 appearances for Estonia, and is currently the fifth-most capped player in the history of the national team. Klavan has won the Estonian Footballer of the Year award a record seven times, in 2012 and six consecutive from 2014 to 2019.

== Early life ==
Klavan was born on 30 October 1985 in Viljandi, Estonia to Tiina and Dzintar Klavan. His father was a professional footballer who played as a midfielder and represented the Estonia national team. Klavan also started playing football as a midfielder; later stating that Zinedine Zidane was his inspiration.

== Club career ==
=== Tulevik ===
Klavan started out playing for his hometown team Tulevik. He made his senior league debut in the Esiliiga on 8 April 2001, playing for Tulevik's reserve team Elva and scoring the winning goal against Sillamäe Kalev in a 2–1 home victory. He moved to Tulevik's first team in 2002 and made his debut in the Meistriliiga on 31 March 2002, at age 16, in a goalless draw against Levadia. While at Tulevik, Klavan had a trial with Sunderland, but was not offered a contract.

=== Flora ===
In July 2003, Klavan joined Meistriliiga club Flora. He made his debut for the club on 11 July 2003, when he came on as a 67th-minute substitute and scored in the 85th minute of a 4–4 away draw against TVMK. Klavan won the Meistriliiga title in the 2003 season.

==== Vålerenga (loan) ====
On 31 August 2004, Klavan joined Norwegian club Vålerenga on a three-month loan for a fee of 300,000 NOK, with an option to sign permanently for €500,000 when the loan period ended. He made his debut in the Tippeligaen on 19 September 2004, coming on as a substitute in the 86th minute of a 4–1 victory over Molde. Klavan made one more league appearance before spending two matches on the bench as an unused substitute. On 19 November 2004, his loan was extended for a year until 30 November 2005.

=== Heracles Almelo ===
On 4 August 2005, Klavan signed a three-year contract with Eredivisie club Heracles Almelo for a fee of €200,000. He made his debut in the Eredivisie on 13 August 2005, in a 1–1 home draw against PSV. Klavan scored his first Eredivisie goal on 31 December 2006, in a 2–2 home draw against Vitesse, and provided the assist for Everton's goal in the same match. He scored his second goal on 24 August 2007, in a 2–1 loss to Roda JC. 30 October 2007, Klavan scored in a 3–0 home victory over FC Omniworld in the third round of the KNVB Cup. On 29 December 2007, Klavan signed a new contract that would extend his stay at the club until 30 June 2009. On 20 April 2008, he scored his side's only goal in a 5–1 loss to Ajax in the last match of the 2007–08 season. In the opening match of the 2008–09 season on 31 August 2008, Klavan set-up Darl Douglas' opening goal and scored the second goal in a 3–1 home victory over Feyenoord.

=== AZ ===
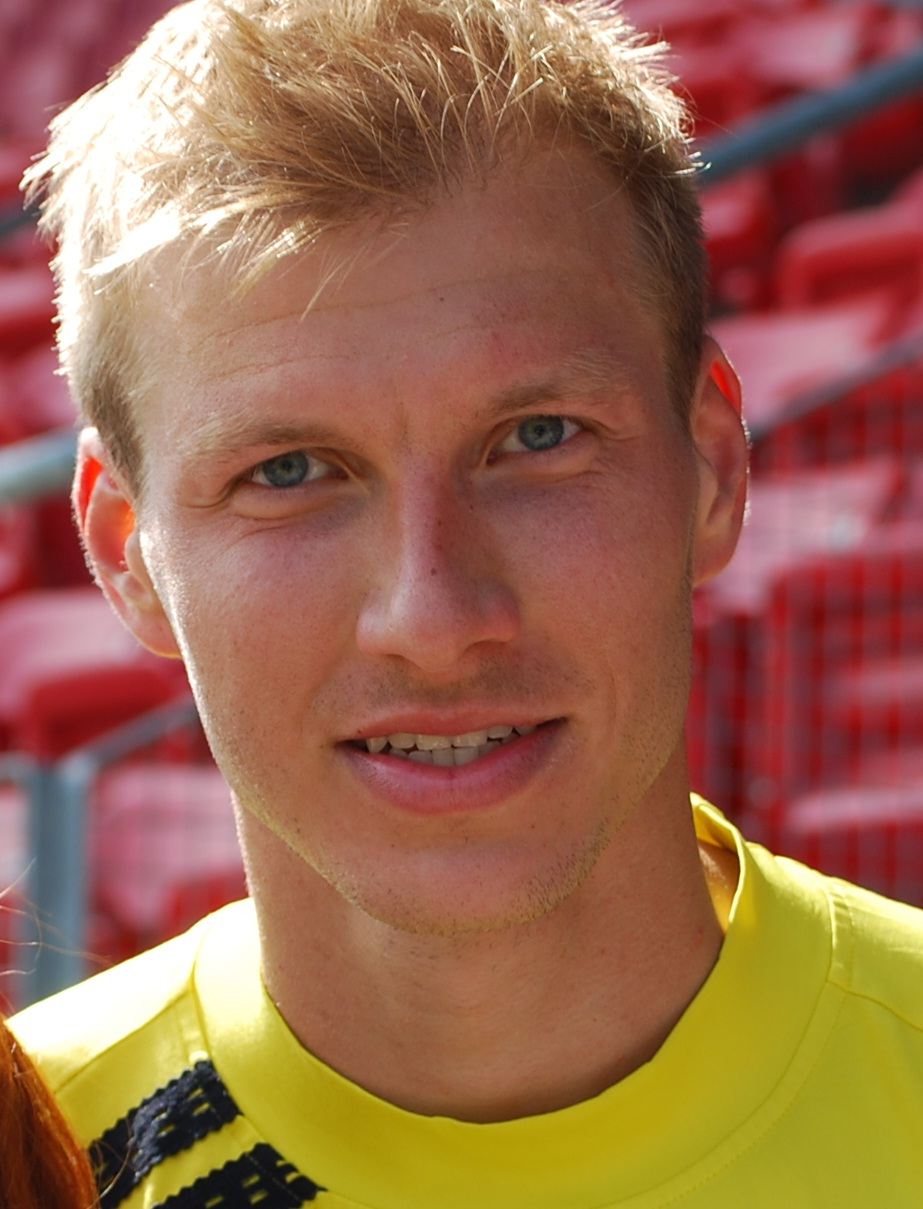
Klavan with AZ in 2011

On 27 January 2009, Klavan joined AZ on loan until the end of the 2008–09 season with an option to sign permanently. He made his debut for the club on 4 February 2009, in a 1–0 home victory over Roda JC when he came on as a 60th-minute substitute for Kees Luijckx. On 14 February, Klavan signed a four-year contract, keeping him with AZ until June 2013. Klavan won the Eredivisie title in the 2008–09 season.

On 29 September 2009, Klavan became the first Estonian to play in the UEFA Champions League group stage when he came on as an 82nd-minute substitute for Sébastien Pocognoli in a 1–1 home draw against Standard Liège. He saw limited playing time under managers Ronald Koeman and Dick Advocaat, making only 11 league appearances in the 2009–10 season, before becoming a regular starter for AZ under Gertjan Verbeek. On 29 July 2010, Klavan scored his first goal for AZ in a 2–0 home win against IFK Göteborg in the third qualifying round of the UEFA Europa League. He scored the third goal in a 3–0 home victory over FC Eindhoven on 10 November 2010, in the fourth round of the KNVB Cup. On 27 October 2011, Klavan scored his side's second goal in the 3–2 extra time win against FC Dordrecht in the third round of the KNVB Cup.

=== FC Augsburg ===
On 2 July 2012, Klavan signed a two-year contract with German club FC Augsburg for an undisclosed fee. He made his debut in the Bundesliga on 14 September 2012, when he came on as a 67th-minute substitute for Matthias Ostrzolek in a 0–0 home draw against VfL Wolfsburg. Klavan soon became a first team regular, establishing himself as a first choice centre back alongside Jan-Ingwer Callsen-Bracker. He scored his first Bundesliga goal on 1 March 2014, in a 1–1 home draw against Hannover 96. On 10 May 2014, Klavan scored in a 2–1 home victory over Eintracht Frankfurt.

On 8 February 2015, Klavan scored the opening goal in a 2–2 home draw against Eintracht Frankfurt. Six days later, he scored in a 3–2 away loss to Werder Bremen. Klavan played every minute of the 2014–15 season as FC Augsburg finished fifth in the league, their highest position in history, and qualified for the 2015–16 UEFA Europa League.

=== Liverpool ===
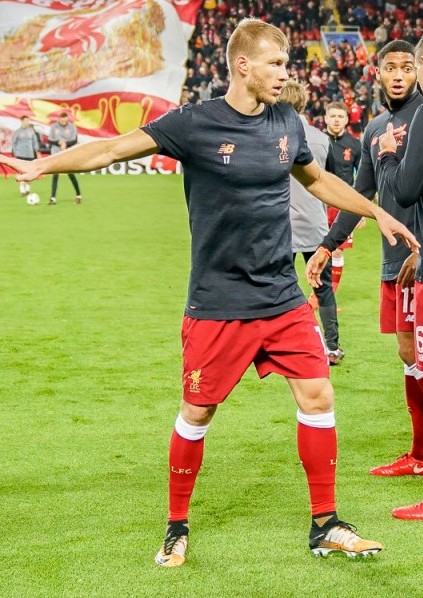
Klavan warming up for Liverpool in the 2017-2018 season.

On 20 July 2016, Klavan signed a three-year contract with Premier League club Liverpool for a reported fee of £4.2 million (€5 million). The transfer fee of €5 million made him the most expensive Estonian footballer ever. The club confirmed that he would wear the number 17 shirt.

Klavan made his debut in the Premier League on 14 August 2016, in a 4–3 victory over Arsenal at Emirates Stadium. He scored his first goal for Liverpool on 20 September 2016, in a 3–0 away victory over Derby County in the third round of the EFL Cup. On 19 December 2016, Klavan was named man of the match for his performance in Liverpool's 1–0 victory in the derby match against Everton at Goodison Park.

On 1 January 2018, Klavan became the first-ever Estonian player to score in the Premier League when he scored the winning goal in the fourth minute of injury time in a 2–1 away win against Burnley. He made eight appearances in the 2017–18 UEFA Champions League and was an unused substitute in Liverpool's 3–1 loss to Real Madrid in the final of the tournament.

=== Cagliari ===
On 17 August 2018, Klavan signed a two-year contract with Italian club Cagliari for a fee of £2 million. He made his debut in the Serie A on 26 August, in a 2–2 home draw against Sassuolo. Klavan made a total of 61 appearances in Serie A over the span of three seasons.

=== Paide Linnameeskond ===
On 1 July 2021, Klavan signed for Estonian Meistriliiga club Paide Linnameeskond, returning to Estonia after 17 years abroad. He made his debut for the club in a 2–1 loss against Śląsk Wrocław in the UEFA Europa Conference League qualifying match and his league debut ended 0–0 against the defending champion Flora on 31 July. He scored two goals in the next game against his boyhood club Tulevik.

=== Tallinna Kalev ===
On 17 July 2023, Klavan signed for Estonian Meistriliiga club Tallinna Kalev. He joined the first team squad of the club, which he has been the president of since 2016. Klavan made his last professional appearance in football on 30 November 2024, guiding Kalev to a 1–0 extra-time victory against Viimsi in the Meistriliiga relegation play-offs.

=== Retirement ===
On 10 December 2024, Klavan held a press conference to announce his retirement from professional football and his candidacy for the presidency of the Estonian Football Association. In an election held on 19 June 2025, Klavan received 34 votes and lost to the incumbent president Aivar Pohlak, who secured 68 votes.

== International career ==
Klavan began his youth career in 1999 with the Estonia under-15 team. He also represented the under-17, under-18, under-20, and under-21 national sides, amassing 22 youth appearances overall.

Klavan made his senior international debut for Estonia on 3 July 2003, at age 17, in 5–1 loss to Lithuania at the 2003 Baltic Cup. He scored his first international goal on 31 May 2006, in a 1–1 home draw against New Zealand in a friendly. Klavan made his 50th appearance for the national team on 11 October 2008, in a 3–0 home defeat to Spain in a qualification match for the 2010 FIFA World Cup. He played in both matches against the Republic of Ireland in the UEFA Euro 2012 qualifying play-offs as Estonia lost 5–1 on aggregate.

On 29 February 2012, Klavan captained Estonia for the first time and scored in a 2–0 friendly victory over El Salvador. In 2012, he succeeded Raio Piiroja as Estonia's captain. On 27 March 2015, Klavan made his 100th appearance for Estonia, in a 0–3 away loss to Switzerland in a UEFA Euro 2016 qualifying match. Klavan has been named Estonian Footballer of the Year a record seven times, in 2012, 2014, 2015, 2016, 2017, 2018 and 2019.

== Personal life ==
Klavan and his wife, Lili Orel, married on 10 June 2011. They have two sons, Romer and Ronan, and one daughter, Luna.

In May 2016, Klavan became president of Estonian football club Tallinna Kalev.

Klavan announced the Estonian jury points at the grand final of Eurovision Song Contest 2023 as the country's spokesperson. The contest was held in the city of Liverpool.

== Career statistics ==
=== Club ===
Appearances and goals by club, season and competition
Club	Season	League			National cup (Note: Includes Estonian Cup, Norwegian Cup, KNVB Cup, DFB-Pokal, FA Cup, Coppa Italia)		League cup (Note: Includes EFL Cup)		Europe		Other		Total	
Club	Season	Division	Apps	Goals	Apps	Goals	Apps	Goals	Apps	Goals	Apps	Goals	Apps	Goals
Elva	2001	Esiliiga	25	5	2	0	—		—		—		27	5
Elva	2002	Esiliiga	6	6	0	0	—		—		—		6	6
Elva	Total		31	11	2	0	—		—		—		33	11
Tulevik	2002	Meistriliiga	18	0	0	0	—		—		—		18	0
Tulevik	2003	Meistriliiga	10	2	2	0	—		—		—		12	2
Tulevik	Total		28	2	2	0	—		—		—		30	2
Flora	2003	Meistriliiga	12	1	1	0	—		2 (Note: Appearance(s) in UEFA Champions League)	0	0	0	15	1
Flora	2004	Meistriliiga	16	1	1	0	—		1	0	0	0	18	1
Flora	Total		28	2	2	0	—		3	0	0	0	33	2
Vålerenga (loan)	2004	Tippeligaen	2	0	0	0	—		—		—		2	0
Vålerenga (loan)	2005	Tippeligaen	0	0	2	0	—		0	0	—		2	0
Vålerenga (loan)	Total		2	0	2	0	—		0	0	—		4	0
Heracles Almelo	2005–06	Eredivisie	15	0	1	0	—		—		2 (Note: Appearances in Eredivisie European play-offs)	0	18	0
Heracles Almelo	2006–07	Eredivisie	32	1	1	0	—		—		—		33	1
Heracles Almelo	2007–08	Eredivisie	29	2	4	1	—		—		—		33	3
Heracles Almelo	2008–09	Eredivisie	19	1	1	0	—		—		—		20	1
Heracles Almelo	Total		95	4	7	1	—		—		2	0	104	5
AZ (loan)	2008–09	Eredivisie	12	0	1	0	—		—		—		13	0
AZ	2009–10	Eredivisie	11	0	1	0	—		1	0	0	0	13	0
AZ	2010–11	Eredivisie	28	0	3	1	—		8 (Note: Appearances in UEFA Europa League)	1	—		39	2
AZ	2011–12	Eredivisie	27	0	4	1	—		8	0	—		39	1
AZ	Total		78	0	9	2	—		17	1	0	0	104	3
FC Augsburg	2012–13	Bundesliga	30	0	2	0	—		—		—		32	0
FC Augsburg	2013–14	Bundesliga	30	2	3	0	—		—		—		33	2
FC Augsburg	2014–15	Bundesliga	34	2	1	0	—		—		—		35	2
FC Augsburg	2015–16	Bundesliga	31	0	3	0	—		6	0	—		40	0
FC Augsburg	Total		125	4	9	0	—		6	0	—		140	4
Liverpool	2016–17	Premier League	20	0	1	0	4	1	—		—		25	1
Liverpool	2017–18	Premier League	19	1	0	0	1	0	8	0	—		28	1
Liverpool	Total		39	1	1	0	5	1	8	0	—		53	2
Cagliari	2018–19	Serie A	15	0	0	0	—		—		—		15	0
Cagliari	2019–20	Serie A	31	0	2	0	—		—		—		33	0
Cagliari	2020–21	Serie A	15	0	1	0	—		—		—		16	0
Cagliari	Total		61	0	3	0	—		—		—		64	0
Paide Linnameeskond	2021	Meistriliiga	10	2	2	0	—		1 (Note: Appearance(s) in UEFA Europa Conference League/UEFA Conference League)	0	0	0	13	2
Paide Linnameeskond	2022	Meistriliiga	11	1	3	0	—		6	0	—		20	1
Paide Linnameeskond	Total		21	3	5	0	—		7	0	0	0	33	3
Tallinna Kalev	2023	Meistriliiga	9	0	0	0	—		—		—		9	0
Tallinna Kalev	2024	Meistriliiga	13	1	1	0	—		1	0	2 (Note: Appearances in Meistriliiga play-offs)	0	17	1
Tallinna Kalev	Total		22	1	1	0	—		1	0	2	0	26	1
Career total			530	28	43	3	5	1	42	1	4	0	624	33

=== International ===
Appearances and goals by national team and year
National team	Year	Apps	Goals
Estonia	2003	5	0
Estonia	2004	12	0
Estonia	2005	8	0
Estonia	2006	6	1
Estonia	2007	11	0
Estonia	2008	10	0
Estonia	2009	10	0
Estonia	2010	4	0
Estonia	2011	9	0
Estonia	2012	8	1
Estonia	2013	7	0
Estonia	2014	9	1
Estonia	2015	9	0
Estonia	2016	8	0
Estonia	2017	6	0
Estonia	2018	3	0
Estonia	2019	2	0
Estonia	2020	0	0
Estonia	2021	0	0
Estonia	2022	2	0
Estonia	2023	0	0
Estonia	2024	1	0
Total		130	3

Scores and results list Estonia's goal tally first, score column indicates score after each Klavan goal

List of international goals scored by Ragnar Klavan
No.	Date	Venue	Cap	Opponent	Score	Result	Competition
1	31 May 2006	A. Le Coq Arena, Tallinn, Estonia	27	New Zealand	1–0	1–1	Friendly
2	29 February 2012	Los Angeles Memorial Coliseum, Los Angeles, United States	76	El Salvador	1–0	2–0	Friendly
3	26 May 2014	A. Le Coq Arena, Tallinn, Estonia	92	Gibraltar	1–0	1–1	Friendly

== Honours ==
Flora

- Meistriliiga: 2003

AZ

- Eredivisie: 2008–09

Liverpool

- UEFA Champions League runner-up: 2017–18

Paide Linnameeskond

- Estonian Cup: 2021–22

Individual

- Estonian Footballer of the Year: 2012, 2014, 2015, 2016, 2017, 2018, 2019

== See also ==
- List of men's footballers with 100 or more international caps
