= Estonian Silverball =

Estonian football award

The Estonian Silverball is an annual award by Estonian Football Journalists' Club, given to the footballer for the best goal scored for the Estonia national football team. The award was launched in 1995. Konstantin Vassiljev has won the award a record seven times.

== Winners ==
Year	Winner	Opponent
1995	Martin Reim	Slovenia
1996	Argo Arbeiter	Andorra
1997	Martin Reim (2)	Lithuania
1998	Sergei Terehhov	Faroe Islands
1999	Martin Reim (3)	Faroe Islands
2000	Indrek Zelinski	Hong Kong
2001	Andres Oper	Netherlands
2002	Teet Allas	Moldova
2003	Indrek Zelinski (2)	Andorra
2004	Kristen Viikmäe	Liechtenstein
2005	Andres Oper (2)	Slovakia
2006	Tarmo Neemelo	Turkey
2007	Indrek Zelinski (3)	Andorra
2008	Vjatšeslav Zahovaiko	Faroe Islands
2009	Konstantin Vassiljev	Armenia
2010	Tarmo Kink	Serbia
2011	Konstantin Vassiljev (2)	Northern Ireland
2012	Konstantin Vassiljev (3)	Poland
2013	Konstantin Vassiljev (4)	Netherlands
2014	Siim Luts	Tajikistan
2015	Sander Puri	Saint Kitts and Nevis
2016	Konstantin Vassiljev (5)	Gibraltar
2017	Mattias Käit	Cyprus
2018	Siim Luts (2)	Hungary
2019	Konstantin Vassiljev (6)	Northern Ireland
2020	Rauno Sappinen	North Macedonia
2021	Mattias Käit (2)	Belgium
2022	Konstantin Vassiljev (7)	Malta
2023	Rauno Sappinen (2)	Austria
2024	Rocco Robert Shein	Azerbaijan
2025	Mattias Käit (3)	Moldova
