= List of Estonian football transfers winter 2017–18 =

This is a list of Estonian football transfers in the winter transfer window 2017–18 by club. Only transfers in Meistriliiga are included.

== Meistriliiga ==
=== Flora ===
In:

No.	Pos.	Nation	Player
—	GK	(Estonia) EST	Magnus Karofeld (loan return from Paide Linnameeskond)
—	MF	(Estonia) EST	Herol Riiberg (loan return from Viljandi JK Tulevik)
—	MF	(Estonia) EST	Aleksandr Dmitrijev (from FCI Tallinn)
—	MF	(Estonia) EST	Frank Liivak (from FK Sarajevo)
—	DF	(Estonia) EST	Jürgen Lorenz (from Tartu JK Tammeka)
—	DF	(Finland) FIN	Anselmi Nurmela (from RoPS)

Out:

No.	Pos.	Nation	Player
—	FW	(Estonia) EST	Hannes Anier (to Thisted FC)
—	MF	(Estonia) EST	Brent Lepistu (to Kristiansund BK)
—	DF	(Estonia) EST	Mairo Miil (on loan to FC Kuressaare)
—	GK	(Estonia) EST	Ingmar Krister Paplavskis (on loan to FC Kuressaare)
—	GK	(Estonia) EST	Richard Aland (on loan to Pärnu JK Vaprus)
—	FW	(Estonia) EST	Rauno Sappinen (on loan to KFCO Beerschot Wilrijk)
—	DF	(Estonia) EST	Joonas Tamm (to Sarpsborg 08 FF)
—	MF	(Estonia) EST	Roman Sobtšenko (to JK Tallinna Kalev)

=== FCI Levadia ===
In:

No.	Pos.	Nation	Player
—	MF	(Estonia) EST	Rasmus Peetson (loan return from Pärnu JK Vaprus)
—	DF	(Estonia) EST	Markus Jürgenson (from Vaasan Palloseura)
—	MF	(Bosnia and Herzegovina) BIH	Muamer Svraka (from NK Rudeš)
—	MF	(Ukraine) UKR	Yuriy Tkachuk (on loan from FC Karpaty Lviv)
—	FW	(Ukraine) UKR	Roman Debelko (on loan from FC Karpaty Lviv)

Out:

No.	Pos.	Nation	Player
—	DF	(Ghana) GHA	Ofosu Appiah (unknown)
—	DF	(Estonia) EST	Artjom Artjunin (to JK Tallinna Kalev)
—	MF	(Estonia) EST	Aleksandr Dmitrijev (to FC Flora)
—	MF	(Estonia) EST	Svjatoslav Jakovlev (to Narva JK Trans)
—	DF	(Cameroon) CMR	Tabi Manga (to KuPS)
—	FW	(Brazil) BRA	Joao Morelli (loan return to Middlesbrough F.C.)
—	MF	(Estonia) EST	Andreas Raudsepp (to JK Tallinna Kalev)
—	MF	(Russia) RUS	Aleksandr Tumasyan (unknown)
—	MF	(Russia) RUS	Sergei Tumasyan (to Nõmme JK Kalju)
—	FW	(Estonia) EST	Albert Prosa (to Valletta FC)
—	FW	(Estonia) EST	Ingemar Teever (retired)
—	GK	(Estonia) EST	Kristjan Tamme (to Paide Linnameeskond)
—	GK	(Estonia) EST	Matvei Igonen (to Lillestrøm SK)
—	FW	(Estonia) EST	Vladimir Voskoboinikov (retired)
—	DF	(Estonia) EST	Vladimir Avilov (to Nõmme Kalju FC)
—	FW	(Estonia) EST	Eduard Golovljov (to Narva JK Trans)
—	DF	(Estonia) EST	Andrei Kalimullin (to Maardu Linnameeskond)
—	MF	(Estonia) EST	Tarmo Kink (unknown)
—	DF	(Estonia) EST	Aleksandr Kulinitš (to NK Krško)
—	GK	(Estonia) EST	Mihhail Lavrentjev (unknown)
—	MF	(Estonia) EST	Artur Rättel (unknown)
—	DF	(Estonia) EST	Aleksandr Volodin (to TJK Legion)
—	FW	(Estonia) EST	Rimo Hunt (to Nõmme Kalju FC)
—	MF	(Estonia) EST	Alex Roosalu (on loan to Viljandi JK Tulevik)
—	MF	(Croatia) CRO	Josip Krznaric (to NK Istra 1961)
—	MF	(Russia) RUS	Yevgeni Kobzar (unknown)

=== Kalju ===
In:

No.	Pos.	Nation	Player
—	DF	(Estonia) EST	Martin Mägi (loan return from Paide Linnameeskond)
—	MF	(Estonia) EST	Vlasi Sinjavski (loan return from Viljandi JK Tulevik)
—	MF	(Russia) RUS	Sergei Tumasyan (from FCI Tallinn)
—	FW	(Estonia) EST	Aleksandr Volkov (from JK Sillamäe Kalev)
—	FW	(Estonia) EST	Rimo Hunt (from FCI Levadia Tallinn)
—	DF	(Estonia) EST	Vladimir Avilov (from FCI Tallinn)
—	DF	(Ukraine) UKR	Andriy Markovych (on loan from FC Karpaty Lviv)

Out:

No.	Pos.	Nation	Player
—	FW	(Brazil) BRA	Carlos Geovane (to Al-Ahly SC)
—	FW	(Estonia) EST	Tarmo Neemelo (to Paide Linnameeskond)
—	DF	(Estonia) EST	Andrei Sidorenkov (unknown)
—	MF	(Russia) RUS	Artur Valikayev (to Olympiakos Nicosia)
—	FW	(Estonia) EST	Janar Toomet (unknown)
—	MF	(Estonia) EST	Artjom Dmitrijev (to FC Lahti)
—	DF	(Estonia) EST	Karl Mööl (to HB Køge)

=== Trans ===
In:

No.	Pos.	Nation	Player
—	MF	(Russia) RUS	Dmitri Proshin (from FC Luki-Energiya)
—	DF	(Bermuda) BER	Dante Leverock (from Robin Hood F.C.)
—	DF	(Estonia) EST	Artjom Davõdov (from JK Sillamäe Kalev)
—	FW	(Estonia) EST	Roman Grigorevski (from JK Sillamäe Kalev)
—	MF	(Estonia) EST	Svjatoslav Jakovlev (from FCI Levadia Tallinn)
—	FW	(Estonia) EST	Eduard Golovljov (from FCI Tallinn)
—	MF	(Russia) RUS	Dmitry Barkov (from FC Istiklol)
—	DF	(Cameroon) CMR	Ernest Sanwo (from Buriram United)

Out:

No.	Pos.	Nation	Player
—	MF	(Estonia) EST	German-Guri Lvov (on loan to Rakvere JK Tarvas)
—	GK	(Estonia) EST	Aleksei Matrossov (to FK Khujand)
—	MF	(Estonia) EST	Nikita Brõlin (to Maardu Linnameeskond)
—	MF	(Estonia) EST	Georgi Tunjov (unknown)
—	MF	(Estonia) EST	Ioan Jakovlev (to JK Tallinna Kalev)
—	FW	(Russia) RUS	Ilja Ferapontov (unknown)

=== Paide Linnameeskond ===
In:

No.	Pos.	Nation	Player
—	MF	(Estonia) EST	Joel Kokla (from FC Nõmme United)
—	FW	(Estonia) EST	Tarmo Neemelo (from Nõmme Kalju FC)
—	DF	(Estonia) EST	Kristjan Pelt (from FC Nõmme United)
—	FW	(Estonia) EST	Henri Välja (from FC Nõmme United)
—	FW	(Estonia) EST	Ian-Erik Valge (from Põhja-Tallinna JK Volta)
—	GK	(Estonia) EST	Kristjan Tamme (from FCI Levadia Tallinn)
—	MF	(Ivory Coast) CIV	Yann Michael Yao (from Floridsdorfer AC)
—	DF	(Ivory Coast) CIV	Boliguibia Ouattara (from Kajaanin Haka)
—	GK	(Italy) ITA	Andrea Liotti (from PS Monti Cimini)
—	DF	(Ukraine) UKR	Oleksandr Suhharov (from JK Sillamäe Kalev)

Out:

No.	Pos.	Nation	Player
—	MF	(Estonia) EST	Artjom Badjuk (unknown)
—	GK	(Estonia) EST	Magnus Karofeld (loan return to FC Flora)
—	MF	(Estonia) EST	Kristofer Kartau (loan return to Nõmme Kalju FC U21)
—	MF	(Estonia) EST	Kristjan Kurim (unknown)
—	DF	(Estonia) EST	Martin Mägi (loan return to Nõmme Kalju FC)
—	FW	(Nigeria) NGA	Jasper Uwaegbulam (unknown)
—	GK	(Estonia) EST	Rene Merilo (on loan to Lasnamäe FC Ajax)
—	GK	(Estonia) EST	Kaarel Rumberg (on loan to JK Tabasalu)
—	GK	(Estonia) EST	Sten-Marten Vahi (to JK Tallinna Kalev)

=== Tammeka ===
In:

No.	Pos.	Nation	Player
—	DF	(Estonia) EST	Daaniel Maanas (from Nõmme Kalju FC U21)
—	MF	(Estonia) EST	Mikk Laas (free agent)
—	DF	(Estonia) EST	Kennet Jädal (unknown)
—	DF	(Finland) FIN	Akim Sairinen (from Gjøvik FF)
—	DF	(Russia) RUS	Mikhail Slashchev (from JK Sillamäe Kalev)

Out:

No.	Pos.	Nation	Player
—	DF	(Estonia) EST	Kaarel Kiidron (retired)
—	FW	(Estonia) EST	Kevin Rääbis (to JK Tallinna Kalev)
—	DF	(Estonia) EST	Jürgen Lorenz (to FC Flora)

=== Tulevik ===
In:

No.	Pos.	Nation	Player
—	GK	(Estonia) EST	Marten Ritson (from SJK)
—	MF	(Estonia) EST	Tauno Mõttus (on loan from JK Tallinna Kalev)
—	MF	(Estonia) EST	Alex Roosalu (from FCI Levadia Tallinn)
—	FW	(Japan) JPN	Yosuke Saito (from Riga FC)

Out:

No.	Pos.	Nation	Player
—	MF	(Estonia) EST	Herol Riiberg (loan return to FC Flora)
—	MF	(Estonia) EST	Vlasi Sinjavski (loan return to Nõmme Kalju FC)
—	MF	(Estonia) EST	Karl Ivar Maar (to FC Kuressaare)
—	FW	(Estonia) EST	Jarmo Ahjupera (unknown)
—	DF	(Estonia) EST	Oskar Berggren (unknown)
—	DF	(Estonia) EST	Kaarel Henn (unknown)

=== Vaprus ===
In:

No.	Pos.	Nation	Player
—	FW	(Estonia) EST	Kristian Lenk (from Pärnu JK)
—	GK	(Estonia) EST	Richard Aland (on loan from FC Flora)
—	MF	(Estonia) EST	Rene Prans (from Tartu FC Santos)
—	DF	(Estonia) EST	Joosep Sarapuu (free agent)
—	FW	(Estonia) EST	Karl Anton Sõerde (on loan from JK Tallinna Kalev)

Out:

No.	Pos.	Nation	Player
—	MF	(Estonia) EST	Rasmus Peetson (loan return to FCI Levadia Tallinn)
—	DF	(Estonia) EST	Jako Kanter (to Pärnu JK)
—	MF	(Estonia) EST	Martin Vunk (retired)

=== Kalev ===
In:

No.	Pos.	Nation	Player
—	DF	(Estonia) EST	Kaspar Laur (on loan from Paide Linnameeskond U21)
—	DF	(Russia) RUS	Daniil Ševjakov (from FCI Levadia U21)
—	MF	(Japan) JPN	Hidetoshi Wakui (from IF Gnistan)
—	MF	(Estonia) EST	Roman Sobtšenko (from FC Flora)
—	MF	(Guinea) GUI	Abdoul Karim Conte (unknown)
—	MF	(Estonia) EST	Ioan Jakovlev (from Narva JK Trans)
—	FW	(Estonia) EST	Kevin Rääbis (from Tartu JK Tammeka)
—	DF	(Estonia) EST	Artjom Artjunin (from FCI Levadia Tallinn)
—	MF	(Estonia) EST	Andreas Raudsepp (from FCI Levadia Tallinn)
—	GK	(Estonia) EST	Sten-Marten Vahi (from Paide Linnameeskond)

Out:

No.	Pos.	Nation	Player
—	GK	(Estonia) EST	Daniil Savitski (unknown)
—	DF	(Estonia) EST	Ando Hausenberg (unknown)
—	FW	(Estonia) EST	Artur Makarov (unknown)
—	FW	(Estonia) EST	Randy Padar (retired)
—	DF	(Estonia) EST	Henrik Sepp (retired)

=== Kuressaare ===
In:

No.	Pos.	Nation	Player
—	DF	(Estonia) EST	Märt Kluge (free agent)
—	DF	(Estonia) EST	Mairo Miil (on loan from FC Flora)
—	GK	(Estonia) EST	Ingmar Krister Paplavskis (on loan from FC Flora)
—	MF	(Estonia) EST	Karl Ivar Maar (from Viljandi JK Tulevik)
—	MF	(Estonia) EST	Rasmus Saar (on loan from FC Flora U21)
—	DF	(Estonia) EST	Renno Soosaar (from FC Flora U21)
—	MF	(Estonia) EST	Georg Ander Sild (on loan from FC Nõmme United)
—	GK	(Estonia) EST	Ralf Hansen (free agent)

Out:

No.	Pos.	Nation	Player
—	FW	(Estonia) EST	Martti Pukk (retired)
—	MF	(Estonia) EST	Mikk Rajaver (unknown)
—	DF	(Estonia) EST	Urmas Rajaver (unknown)
—	DF	(Estonia) EST	Pelle Pohlak (unknown)

== See also ==
- 2018 Meistriliiga
