= 2022–23 SKN St. Pölten season =

SKN St. Pölten
2022–23 season
- Chairman: Helmut Schwarzl
- Manager: Stephan Helm
- Stadium: NV Arena
- Austrian Football Second League: 3rd
- Austrian Cup: Second round
- Top goalscorer: Luis Hartwig (12)

The 2022–23 season was the 23rd in the history of SKN St. Pölten and their second consecutive season in the top flight. The club participated in the Austrian Football Second League and the Austrian Cup.

== Players ==
=== First team squad ===
As of 21 August 2022

Note: Flags indicate national team as defined under FIFA eligibility rules; some limited exceptions apply. Players may hold more than one non-FIFA nationality.

No.	Pos.	Nation	Player
2	DF	AUT	Filip Drljepan
3	DF	AUT	Thomas Alexiev
5	DF	CIV	Souleymane Kone
6	MF	GUI	Karim Conté
7	FW	CGO	Kévin Monzialo
8	MF	AUT	Christoph Messerer
9	FW	AUT	Bernd Gschweidl
10	FW	USA	Ulysses Llanez (on loan from Wolfsburg)
11	MF	SLE	George Davies
12	GK	AUT	Franz Stolz
15	DF	AUT	Christian Ramsebner
16	MF	AUT	Nicolas Wisak
17	FW	CIV	Yacouba Silue
18	MF	AUT	Benedict Scharner

No.	Pos.	Nation	Player
19	DF	AUT	David Riegler
20	MF	AUT	Daniel Schütz
22	FW	NED	Jaden Montnor
24	DF	GER	Fadhel Morou
25	MF	AUT	Thomas Salamon
26	GK	AUT	Thomas Turner
27	GK	AUT	Pirmin Strasser
28	FW	GER	Luis Hartwig (on loan from Bochum)
37	DF	AUT	Julian Keiblinger
47	FW	AUT	Marcel Pemmer
49	FW	JPN	Rio Nitta (on loan from Sagan Tosu)
66	DF	SUI	Yannick Scheidegger
77	MF	AUT	Din Barlov

== Transfers ==
=== In ===
Pos.	Player	Transferred from	Fee	Date	Source
FW	(Republic of the Congo) Kévin Monzialo	(Switzerland) Lugano	Undisclosed	7 July 2022	
MF	(Switzerland) Yannick Scheidegger	(Switzerland) Grasshopper Club Zurich	Undisclosed	7 July 2022	
FW	(Germany) Luis Hartwig	(Germany) VfL Bochum	Loan	14 July 2022	
FW	(Japan) Rio Nitta	(Japan) Sagan Tosu	Loan	1 August 2022	

== Pre-season and friendlies ==
Win Draw Loss Fixtures

25 June 2022 Friendly	St. Pölten (Austria)	4–2	Austria Wien	Böheimkirchen, Austria
16:00 CEST (UTC+2)				Stadium: Sportplatz SV Würth Böheimkirchen

29 June 2022 Friendly	St. Pölten (Austria)	3–2	(Romania) Rapid București	St. Pölten, Austria
18:30 CEST (UTC+2)				Stadium: Stadtsportanlage

2 July 2022 Friendly	St. Pölten (Austria)	4–0	(Austria) Hartberg	Aspang Markt, Austria
16:30 CEST (UTC+2)				Stadium: Sportplatz Aspang

6 July 2022 Friendly	St. Pölten (Austria)	0–4	(Hungary) Puskás Akadémia	Andorf, Austria
17:30 CEST (UTC+2)				Stadium: DAXL-Arena Andorf

9 July 2022 Friendly	St. Pölten (Austria)	1–3	(Czech Republic) Bohemians 1905	Ferschnitz, Austria
17:00 CEST (UTC+2)				Stadium: Sportplatz USV Ferschnitz

26 November 2022 Friendly	St. Pölten (Austria)	7–1	(Czech Republic) Dynamo České Budějovice	Sankt Pölten
12:00 CET (UTC+1)				Stadium: NV Arena

2 December 2022 Friendly	St. Pölten (Austria)	1–1	(Austria) Hartberg	Sankt Pölten
15:00 CET (UTC+1)				Stadium: NV Arena

10 December 2022 Friendly	St. Pölten (Austria)	0–1	(Austria) LASK	Austria
14:00 CET (UTC+1)

13 January 2023 Friendly	Marchfeld Donauauen (Austria)	0–2	(Austria) St. Pölten	Austria
17:30 CET (UTC+1)

17 January 2023 Friendly	St. Pölten (Austria)	0–1	(Hungary) Haladás	Austria
13:00 CET (UTC+1)

20 January 2023 Friendly	Hartberg (Austria)	1–1	(Austria) St. Pölten	Austria
14:00 CET (UTC+1)

24 January 2023 Friendly	FCM Traiskirchen (Austria)	4–0	(Austria) St. Pölten	Austria
17:30 CET (UTC+1)

25 January 2023 Friendly	St. Pölten (Austria)	2–2	(Slovakia) Slovan Bratislava	Austria
14:00 CET (UTC+1)

== Competitions ==
=== Overall record ===
Competition	First match	Last match	Starting round	Final position	Record							
Competition	First match	Last match	Starting round	Final position	Pld	W	D	L	GF	GA	GD	Win %
Austrian Football Second League	23 July 2022	4 June 2023	Matchday 1	3rd	30	17	5	8	53	27	+26	56.67
Austrian Cup	16 July 2022	30 August 2022	First round	Second round	2	1	0	1	3	4	−1	50.00
Total					32	18	5	9	56	31	+25	56.25

Source: Soccerway

=== Austrian Football Second League ===
==== League table ====
Pos	Team	Pld	W	D	L	GF	GA	GD	Pts	Promotion or relegation
1	Blau-Weiß Linz (C, P)	30	19	4	7	63	27	+36	61	Promotion to 2023–24 Austrian Football Bundesliga
2	Grazer AK	30	17	9	4	52	29	+23	60	
3	SKN St. Pölten	30	17	5	8	53	27	+26	56	
4	SV Horn	30	13	9	8	38	33	+5	48	
5	SKU Amstetten	30	12	9	9	49	49	0	45	

Updated to match(es) played on 4 June 2023. Source: 2.Liga Table
Rules for classification: 1) Points; 2) Direct Duel; 3) Goal difference; 4) Goals scored; 5) Matches won; 6) Away matches won; 7) Away goals scored
(C) Champions; (P) Promoted

==== Results summary ====
Overall								Home						Away					
Pld	W	D	L	GF	GA	GD	Pts	W	D	L	GF	GA	GD	W	D	L	GF	GA	GD
20	13	2	5	37	17	+20	41	5	1	4	18	13	+5	8	1	1	19	4	+15

Last updated: 17 March 2023.
Source: ADMIRAL 2. Liga

==== Results by round ====
Round	1	2	3	4	5	6	7	8	9	10	11	12	13	14	15	16	17	18	19	20	21
Ground	H	A	A	H	H	A	H	A	A	H	A	H	A	H	H	A	A	H	A	H	A
Result	W	W	D	L	W	L	L	W	W	L	W	D	W	W	W	W	W	L	W	W	
Position	5	4	4	7	3	5	8	6	4	8	6	6	4	2	2	1	1	1	1	1	

Updated to match(es) played on 17 March 2023. Source: ADMIRAL 2. Liga
A = Away; H = Home; W = Win; D = Draw; L = Loss

==== Matches ====
The league fixtures were announced on 24 June 2022.

23 July 2022 1	St. Pölten	2–0	Dornbirn	St. Pölten
17:00 CEST	Montnor 2'; David Riegler (yellow card) 68'; Din Barlov 70'	Report	Jaúregui (yellow card) 60'; Ibrisimovic (yellow card) 90+5'; Cavafe (yellow card) 90+6' (yellow-red card) 90+7'	Stadium: NV Arena; Attendance: 1,154; Referee: (Austria) Thomas Fröhlacher

29 July 2022 2	Rapid Wien II	1–5	St. Pölten	Wien
18:10 CEST		Report		Stadium: Allianz Stadion

5 August 2022 3	First Vienna	1–1	St. Pölten	Wien
18:10 CEST	Auer 19' (yellow card) 33'	Report	Monzialo (yellow card) 52'; David Riegler (yellow card) 72'; Hartwig 77'; Julian Keiblinger (yellow card) 81'	Stadium: Hohe Warte Stadium; Attendance: 1,657; Referee: (Austria) Chiristian-Petru Ciochirca

12 August 2022 4	St. Pölten	2–5	Sturm Graz II	St. Pölten
18:10 CEST		Report		Stadium: NV Arena; Attendance: 1,209

19 August 2022 5	St. Pölten	2–0	Kapfenberger SV	St. Pölten
18:10 CEST	Niklas Szerencsi 9' (o.g.); Yacouba Silue (yellow card) 33'; Nicolas Wisak (yellow card) 42'; Benedict Scharner (yellow card) 45'; Davies 81'; Ramsebner (yellow card) 83'	Report	Niklas Szerencsi (yellow card) 26'	Stadium: NV Arena; Attendance: 1,001; Referee: (Austria) Florian Jandl

26 August 2022 6	Admira	1–0	St. Pölten	Maria Enzersdorf
20:30 CEST	Mamina Badji (yellow card) 7'; Ristanic 13'; Raphael Gallé (yellow card) 41'; Julian Buchta (yellow card) 45'; Rasner (yellow card) 72'; Zwierschitz (yellow card) 90+3'	Report	Julian Keiblinger (red card) 90+3'; Din Barlov (yellow card) 90+3'	Stadium: Motion invest Arena; Attendance: 1,600; Referee: (Austria) Julian Weinberger

4 September 2022 7	St. Pölten	1–2	Floridsdorfer AC	St. Pölten
10:30 CEST	Yacouba Silue 29'; Monzialo (red card) 34'; Ramsebner (yellow card) 42'; Julian Keiblinger (yellow card) 73'	Report	Bubalović (yellow card) 42' (goal) 81'; Leomend Krasniqi (yellow card) 47' (goal) 52'; Clemens Hubmann (yellow card) 75'; Simon Spari (yellow card) 90+4'	Stadium: NV Arena; Attendance: 1,335; Referee: (Austria) Arnes Talic

10 September 2022 8	Liefering	1–2	St. Pölten	Grödig
14:30 CEST	Sandro Molnar (yellow card) 21'; Halwachs (yellow card) 23'; Konaté (yellow card) 68' (goal) 75' (pen.)	Report	Yacouba Silue 14'; Din Barlov 38'	Stadium: Untersberg-Arena; Attendance: 135; Referee: (Austria) Harald Lechner

16 September 2022 9	Blau-Weiß Linz	0–1	St. Pölten	Linz
18:10 CEST		Report	Kone (yellow card) 16'; Montnor 90+2'; Llanez (yellow card) 90+3'	Stadium: Linzer Stadion; Attendance: 888; Referee: (Austria) Jakub Semler

30 September 2022 10	St. Pölten	2–3	Amstetten	St. Pölten
20:30 CEST	Julian Keiblinger 9' (pen.) 63'; Yacouba Silue (yellow card) 23'; Salamon (yellow card) 78'	Report	Sebastian Leimhofer 31'; Deinhofer (yellow card) 71'; Mayer (yellow card) 84'; Stefan Feiertag 86'; Yannick Scheidegger 90+1' (o.g.)	Stadium: NV Arena; Attendance: 1,533; Referee: (Austria) Safak Barmaksiz

7 October 2022 11	Vorwärts Steyr	0–1	St. Pölten	Steyr
18:10 CEST	Aleksandar Maric (yellow card) 24'; Alberto Prada (yellow card) 71'; Nico Wiesinger (yellow card) 88'	Report	Din Barlov 25'; David Riegler (yellow card) 55'; Conté (yellow card) 65'	Stadium: LIWEST Arena; Attendance: 1,001; Referee: (Austria) Florian Jäger

14 October 2022 12	St. Pölten	0–0	Grazer AK	St. Pölten
18:10 CEST	Conté (yellow card) 73'; David Riegler (yellow card) 88'; Ramsebner (yellow card) 89'; Julian Keiblinger (yellow card) 89'	Report	Michael Lang (yellow card) 90+1'	Stadium: NV Arena; Attendance: 1,424; Referee: (Austria) Gerhard Grobelnik

=== Austrian Cup ===
16 July 2022 Round 1	Leobendorf	1–2	St. Pölten	Leobendorf
18:30 CEST	Viertl (yellow card) 45'; Knorad (yellow card) 64'; Düzgün (yellow card) 77'; Laschet (yellow card) 84'; Bartholomay 90+3'	Report	Ramsebner (yellow card) 42'; Llanez 72'; Franz Stolz (yellow card) 83'; Monzialo (yellow card) 83'; Yacouba Silue 90+5'	Stadium: Sportplatz Leobendorf; Attendance: 400; Referee: (Austria) Daniel Stauber

30 August 2022 Round 2	Horn	3–1	St. Pölten	Horn
19:30 CEST	Julian Tomka 32'; Benjamin Mulahalilovic 37' 90+3'; Gashi (yellow card) 40'; Hausjell (yellow card) 87'; Pronichev (yellow card) 90+1'	Report	Yacouba Silue (yellow card) 33'; Llanez 50' (yellow card) 51' (red card) 90+2'; Fadhel Morou (yellow card) 59'; Conté (yellow card) 67'; Montnor (yellow card) 80'	Stadium: Sparkasse Horn Arena; Attendance: 970; Referee: (Austria) Markus Hameter
