= List of Estonian football transfers summer 2018 =

This is a list of Estonian football transfers in the summer transfer window 2018 by club. Only transfers in Meistriliiga are included.

== Meistriliiga ==
=== Flora Tallinn ===
In:

No.	Pos.	Nation	Player
—	DF	EST	Henrik Pürg (from Nõmme Kalju)
—	FW	EST	Rauno Sappinen (loan return from Beerschot Wilrijk)
—	MF	EST	Michael Schjønning-Larsen (from Hellerup IK)
—	MF	EST	Vlasiy Sinyavskiy (from Nõmme Kalju)

Out:

No.	Pos.	Nation	Player
—	FW	EST	Henri Järvelaid (on loan to Tartu JK Tammeka)
—	DF	EST	Marco Lukka (on loan to JK Tallinna Kalev)
—	MF	EST	Herol Riiberg (on loan to Viljandi Tulevik)
—	FW	EST	Rauno Sappinen (on loan to Den Bosch)

=== FCI Levadia ===
In:

No.	Pos.	Nation	Player
—	MF	AZE	Cem Felek (from TSV Steinbach)
—	MF	EST	Karl Rudolf Õigus (from Santos)

Out:

No.	Pos.	Nation	Player
—	MF	EST	Pavel Dõmov (on loan to Paide Linnameeskond)
—	MF	EST	Pavel Marin (on loan to KPV)

=== Nõmme Kalju ===
In:

No.	Pos.	Nation	Player
—	MF	CRO	Marko Brtan (from HNK Gorica)
—	DF	BRA	William Gustavo (free agent)
—	MF	EST	Kaspar Paur (from Tartu JK Tammeka)

Out:

No.	Pos.	Nation	Player
—	DF	EST	Henrik Pürg (to Flora Tallinn)
—	MF	EST	Vlasiy Sinyavskiy (to Flora Tallinn)
—	MF	RUS	Sergei Tumasyan (to Sibir Novosibirsk)

=== Trans ===
In:

No.	Pos.	Nation	Player
—	MF	ALB	Arbër Basha (from FC Kamza)
—	GK	KOS	Betim Halimi (from KF Drita)
—	DF	ESP	Héctor Pano Marrero (from CD Marino)
—	DF	BRA	Matheus Troche (from SC Ideal)

Out:

No.	Pos.	Nation	Player
—	FW	RUS	Roman Grigorevski (unknown)
—	MF	EST	Svjatoslav Jakovlev (unknown)
—	DF	ESP	Héctor Pano Marrero (unknown)
—	DF	CMR	Ernest Sanwo (unknown)

=== Paide Linnameeskond ===
In:

No.	Pos.	Nation	Player
—	MF	EST	Pavel Dõmov (on loan from FCI Levadia)
—	DF	EST	Märten Pajunurm (returned from university)
—	GK	EST	Kaarel Rumberg (loan return from JK Tabasalu)

Out:

No.	Pos.	Nation	Player
—	DF	EST	Markus Allast (to JK Tallinna Kalev)
—	FW	EST	Kenert Anniste (on loan to Keila JK)
—	FW	NGA	Samson Iyede (to BK Fremad Amager)
—	DF	RUS	Nikita Novopašin (unknown)
—	DF	CIV	Boliguibia Ouattara (unknown)
—	DF	EST	Rico Reinoja (on loan to Keila JK)
—	DF	UKR	Oleksandr Sukharov (to FC Avanhard Kramatorsk)
—	GK	EST	Kristjan Tamme (decided to take a break from football)
—	FW	EST	Ian-Erik Valge (unknown)

=== Tammeka ===
In:

No.	Pos.	Nation	Player
—	FW	EST	Henri Järvelaid (on loan from FC Flora)

Out:

No.	Pos.	Nation	Player
—	MF	EST	Kaspar Paur (to Nõmme Kalju FC)

=== Tulevik ===
In:

No.	Pos.	Nation	Player
—	GK	EST	Andreas Kallaste (on loan from Vändra JK Vaprus)
—	MF	EST	Kristjan Kask (on loan from FC Flora U21)
—	MF	EST	Herol Riiberg (on loan from Flora Tallinn)

Out:

No.	Pos.	Nation	Player
—	FW	JPN	Yosuke Saito (retired)

=== Vaprus ===
In:

No.	Pos.	Nation	Player
—	MF	EST	Juhan Jakobson (on loan from JK Tallinna Kalev)
—	MF	GEO	Gegi Kekua (from FC Dinamo Batumi)
—	FW	ENG	Dave Moli
—	MF	EST	Kaspar Tilga (on loan from JK Tallinna Kalev)

Out:

No.	Pos.	Nation	Player
—	GK	EST	Andreas Kallaste (returned to Vändra JK Vaprus)

=== Kuressaare ===
In:

No.	Pos.	Nation	Player

Out:

No.	Pos.	Nation	Player
—	MF	EST	Georg Ander Sild (returned to FC Nõmme United)

=== JK Tallinna Kalev ===
In:

No.	Pos.	Nation	Player
—	DF	EST	Markus Allast (from Paide Linnameeskond)
—	FW	EST	Hannes Anier (from Thisted FC)
—	DF	CMR	Steve Kingue (from Nkufo Academy)
—	DF	EST	Marco Lukka (on loan from Flora Tallinn)
—	DF	EST	Karl Mööl (from HB Køge)

Out:

No.	Pos.	Nation	Player
—	DF	EST	Artjom Artjunin (to SFC Etar Veliko Tarnovo)
—	MF	GUI	Abdoul Karim Conte (to FC Wacker Innsbruck)
—	DF	POR	Sandro Embalo (unknown)
—	DF	EST	Hans-Kristjan Hansberg (unknown)
—	MF	EST	Juhan Jakobson (unknown)
—	FW	EST	Juhan Jograf Siim (unknown)
—	MF	EST	Alex Sander Sepp (to FC Nõmme United)
