= Aleksandar Rogić =

Serbian football manager

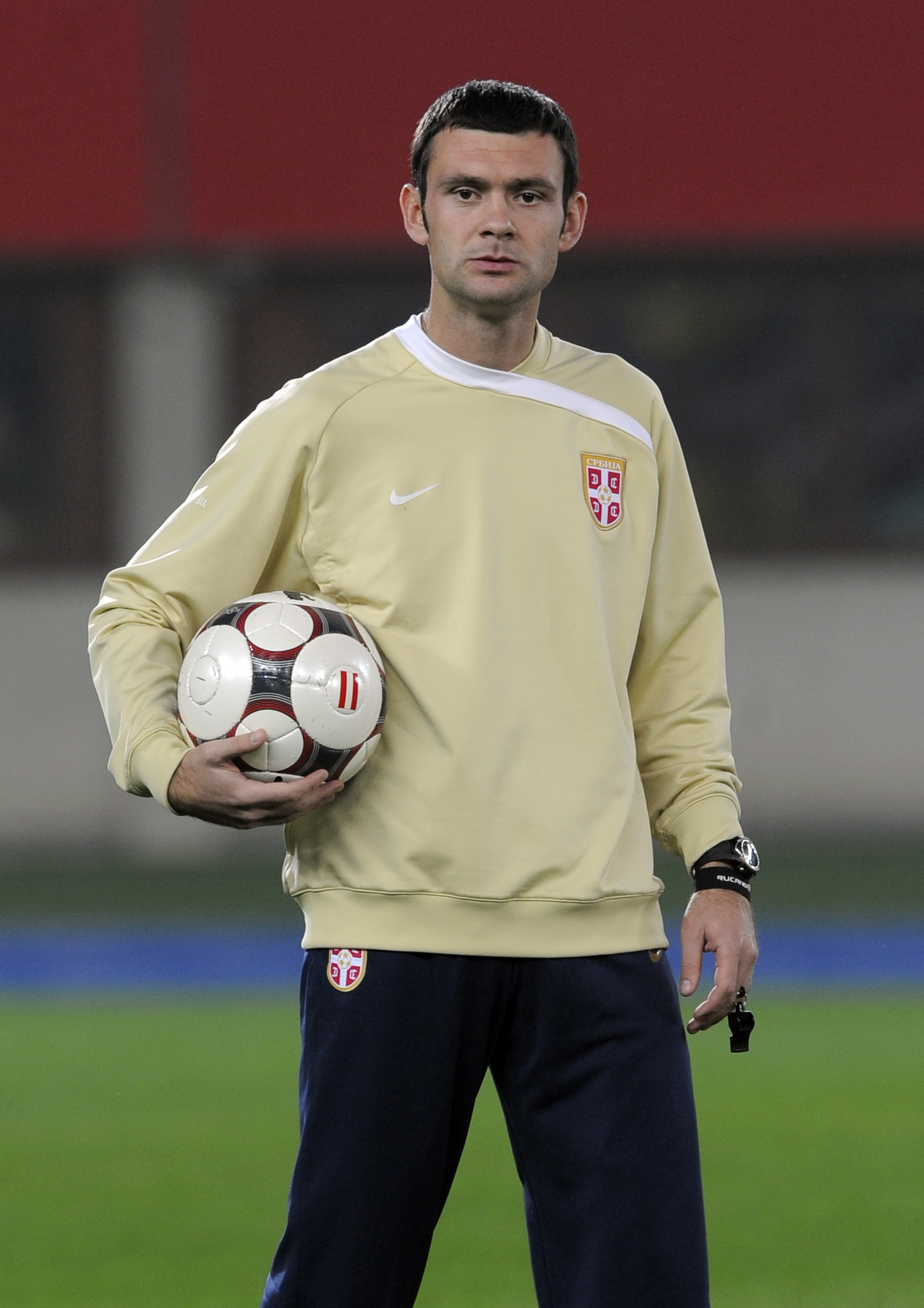
- Rogić in 2008

Personal information
- Date of birth: 3 August 1981 (age 45)
- Place of birth: Titovo Užice, SFR Yugoslavia

Team information
- Current team: Al-Nassr (assistant manager)

Youth career
- 1990–1996: Sloboda Užice
- 1996–1999: OFK Beograd

Senior career*
Years	Team	Apps	(Gls)
2000	Milicionar		
2001	Kozara Gradiška		
2002	Radnički Beograd		

Managerial career
- 2003–2007: Milicionar, Rad (youth)
- 2017: FCI Tallinn
- 2017–2019: Levadia Tallinn
- 2019–2020: Arka Gdynia
- 2021: Serbia U19
- 2021–2022: Serbia U20
- * Club domestic league appearances and goals

Aleksandar Rogić (Serbian: Александар Рогић; born 3 August 1981) is a Serbian professional football coach who is currently an assistant manager of Saudi Pro League club Al-Nassr. Rogić worked for Serbia national football team and Ghana national football team as assistant coach. During his career, he collaborated with Radomir Antić, Dick Advocaat, Vladimir Vermezović, Goran Stevanović, Danilo Dončić.

== Playing career ==
Rogić started his playing career in FK Sloboda Užice youth squad. In 1996, he became a part of OFK Beograd youth football school. He played in senior teams of FK Milicionar from 1999 to 2000, FK Kozara in Bosnia and Hercegovina and FK Radnički Beograd in 2002.

== Managerial career ==
=== Beginnings ===
Rogić was one of the students of Faculty of Sport and Physical Education in University of Belgrade. During his studies, he started his coaching career working as the youngest coach of junior categories in FK Milicionar Beograd and FK Rad from 2003 to 2007.

=== Senior career ===
Rogić began his senior coaching career in Malta, working at FC Floriana in the 2007–08 season.

In August 2008, he became assistant coach of the Serbia national football team (managed by Radomir Antić) thus becoming the youngest coach of the senior team in Serbian and Yugoslavian football history, and the youngest coach who participated in the 2010 FIFA World Cup in South Africa.

In 2011, he became an assistant coach of Ghana national football team, working side by side with Goran Stevanović. He also participated in the 2012 Africa Cup of Nations in Gabon and Equatorial Guinea, where Ghana national football team finished in fourth place.

During 2012, he was an assistant coach to Vladimir Vermezović in FK Partizan, when the club qualified for the 2012–13 UEFA Europa League group stage.

On 25 December 2012, it was announced that Radomir Antić signed a two-year contract with Chinese Super League side Shandong Luneng Taishan with Rogić as his assistant. Although leading Shandong Luneng, who finished the 12th in the 2012 season, to reach the second place of the league, they were released by Shandong on 21 December 2013.

In September 2014, Rogić rejoined Serbia national football team managed by Dick Advocaat, assisting him in planning activities, practices, fixtures and analysing opponents.

He returned to China in January 2015 as an assistant coach for Radomir Antić in Hebei Zhongji.

In May 2017, Aleksandar was hired by the Educational Center of Football Association of Serbia as a lecturer in UEFA A licence program for the field of "Standard situations" as part of the overall tactical preparation of football players.

On 29 July 2017, Rogić was announced as the head coach of FCI Tallinn, 2016 Meistriliiga champion. In his first month in charge, he won the “Manager of the Month” award by Meistriliiga, achieving 6 victories in 7 games, which included winning derby matches against FC Levadia Tallinn (2–1) and FC Flora (4–2).

After the fusion of FCI Tallinn and FC Levadia Tallinn in November 2017, Aleksandar became the head coach of FC Levadia Tallinn, 9-time champions of Estonia. Rogić's first managerial trophy came on 23 February 2018, winning the Estonian Supercup against FC Flora. Levadia came back from two goals down, with late goals from Nikita Andrejev (84') and Kiril Nesterov (87'), eventually defeating Flora 4–3 on penalties. The same opponent was beaten in the finals of the Estonian Cup on 19 May, this time by 1–0, securing the second trophy for Levadia under Rogić. In April 2018, Aleksandar was again awarded the “Manager of the Month” award by Meistriliiga.

On 11 October 2019, Rogić joined Polish Ekstraklasa side Arka Gdynia, two-time winners of the Polish Cup and the Polish Super Cup.

On 18 January 2021, he was appointed manager of the Serbia national under-19 team by Football Association of Serbia. He debuted with two wins against Bosnia and Herzegovina, played on 23 and 25 February 2021. After the cancelation of the qualifying tournament for European championship due to the COVID-19 pandemic, the executive committee of Football Association of Serbia appointed Rogić as the manager of Serbia U20 on 4 April 2021.

On 12 June 2022, he returned to Poland, joining Kosta Runjaić's staff at Legia Warsaw as an assistant coach. Following the 2022–23 season, which saw Legia finish 2nd in the league table and win the Polish Cup, Rogić left the club.

On 6 June 2024, Rogić was hired as an assistant manager by CSKA Moscow. He would assist Marko Nikolić, whom he previously assisted at Shabab Al Ahli.

== Honours ==
Individual

- Meistriliiga Manager of the Month: August 2017, April 2018, September 2018, June 2019
- Ekstraklasa Coach of the Month: December 2019
