= Knut Hartwig =

German footballer

Personal information
- Date of birth: 13 November 1969 (age 56)
- Place of birth: Münster, West Germany
- Height: 1.81 m (5 ft 11 1/2 in)
- Position: Midfielder

Youth career
- 1974–1977: DJK Dülmen
- 1977–: SV Herbede
- –1988: VfL Bochum

Senior career*
Years	Team	Apps	(Gls)
1988–1992	VfL Bochum II		
1992–1997	Wuppertaler SV		
1997–1998	SC Preußen Münster		
1998–2000	Rot-Weiss Essen		
2000–2004	Borussia Wuppertal		
2004–2005	Wuppertaler SV II		
- * Club domestic league appearances and goals

Knut Hartwig (born 13 November 1969) is retired a German football midfielder. Hartwig portrayed Fritz Walter in the movie The Miracle of Bern.

== Career statistics ==
Appearances and goals by club, season and competition
Club	Season	League			National Cup		Total	
Club	Season	Division	Apps	Goals	Apps	Goals	Apps	Goals
VfL Bochum II	1987–88	Oberliga Westfalen			—			
VfL Bochum II	1988–89	Verbandsliga Westfalen			—			
VfL Bochum II	1989–90	Oberliga Westfalen			—			
VfL Bochum II	1990–91	Oberliga Westfalen			—			
VfL Bochum II	1991–92	Oberliga Westfalen			—			
VfL Bochum II	Total				0	0		
Wuppertaler SV	1992–93	2. Bundesliga	40	5	1	0	41	5
Wuppertaler SV	1993–94	2. Bundesliga	31	4	1	0	32	4
Wuppertaler SV	1994–95	Regionalliga West			0	0		
Wuppertaler SV	1995–96	Regionalliga West			—			
Wuppertaler SV	1996–97	Regionalliga West			—			
Wuppertaler SV	Total				2	0		
SC Preußen Münster	1997–98	Regionalliga West			1	0		
SC Preußen Münster	Total				1	0		
Rot-Weiss Essen	1998–99	Oberliga Nordrhein			—			
Rot-Weiss Essen	1999–00	Regionalliga West			—			
Rot-Weiss Essen	Total				0	0		
Borussia Wuppertal	2000–01	Verbandsliga Niederrhein			—			
Borussia Wuppertal	2001–02	Oberliga Nordrhein			—			
Borussia Wuppertal	2002–03	Oberliga Nordrhein			—			
Borussia Wuppertal	2003–04	Oberliga Nordrhein			—			
Borussia Wuppertal	Total				0	0		
Wuppertaler SV II	2004–05	Oberliga Nordrhein			—			
Wuppertaler SV II	Total				0	0		
Career total					3	0		

== Personal life ==
Knut Hartwig is the father of Luis Hartwig.
