= 2017 Meistriliiga =

Estonian national championships in football

Meistriliiga
- Season: 2017
- Dates: 3 March 2017 – 4 November 2017
- Champions: Flora; 11th title
- Relegated: Sillamäe Kalev
- Champions League: Flora
- Europa League: Levadia; Nõmme Kalju; Narva Trans
- Matches: 180
- Goals: 658 (3.66 per match)
- Top goalscorer: Albert Prosa; Rauno Sappinen (27 goals)
- Best goalkeeper: Sergei Lepmets (21 clean sheets)
- Biggest home win: FCI Tallinn 11–1 Vaprus (22 May 2017)
- Biggest away win: Vaprus 0–10 Flora (16 June 2017)
- Highest scoring: FCI Tallinn 11–1 Vaprus (22 May 2017)
- Longest winning run: 15 matches Flora
- Longest unbeaten run: 26 matches Flora
- Longest winless run: 21 matches Vaprus
- Longest losing run: 17 matches Vaprus

The 2017 Meistriliiga (known as A. Le Coq Premium Liiga for sponsorship reasons) was the 27th season of the Meistriliiga, the top Estonian league for association football clubs, since its establishment in 1992. The season began on 3 March 2017 and concluded on 4 November 2017. FCI Tallinn began the season as defending champions of the 2016 season.

Flora won their 11th Meistriliiga title following a 2–0 home win over Tammeka on 28 October 2017.

== Teams ==
A total of 10 teams contested the league, including 8 teams from the 2016 season. Tarvas were relegated after a winless season. Their spot was taken by Esiliiga champions Tulevik, making an immediate return after their 2015 relegation.

In the relegation play-off Pärnu Linnameeskond successfully defended their league spot by defeating challengers Maardu Linnameeskond, but on 11 January 2017 Pärnu Linnameeskond, a union of football clubs from Pärnu, broke up. Vaprus, one of the three clubs that had formed Linnameeskond, took over the league spot.

Defending champions Infonet underwent a name change due to the UEFA restrictions regarding sponsorship names and became FCI Tallinn.

=== Venues ===
Locations of the 2017 Meistriliiga teams

Team	Location	Stadium	Capacity
FCI Tallinn	Tallinn	Infonet Lasnamäe Stadium	500
Flora	Tallinn	A. Le Coq Arena	10,340
Levadia	Tallinn	Kadriorg Stadium	5,000
Narva Trans	Narva	Narva Kreenholm Stadium	1,065
Nõmme Kalju	Tallinn	Hiiu Stadium	650
Paide Linnameeskond	Paide	Paide linnastaadion	268
Sillamäe Kalev	Sillamäe	Sillamäe Kalev Stadium	800
Tammeka	Tartu	Tartu Tamme Stadium	1,500
Tulevik	Viljandi	Viljandi linnastaadion	1,084
Vaprus	Pärnu	Pärnu Rannastaadion	1,501

=== Personnel and kits ===
Team	Manager	Captain	Kit manufacturer	Shirt sponsor
FCI Tallinn	(Serbia) Aleksandar Rogić	(Estonia) Andrei Kalimullin	Joma	Infonet
Flora	(Netherlands) Arno Pijpers	(Estonia) Brent Lepistu	Nike	Tele2
Levadia	(Estonia) Igor Prins	(Estonia) Rimo Hunt	Adidas	Viimsi Keevitus
Narva Trans	(Russia) Adyam Kuzyaev	(Ivory Coast) Irié	Nike	Sportland
Nõmme Kalju	(Russia) Sergei Frantsev	(Estonia) Vitali Teleš	Adidas	help.ee
Paide Linnameeskond	(Estonia) Vjatšeslav Zahovaiko	(Estonia) Andre Frolov	Nike	Enemat
Sillamäe Kalev	(Ukraine) Irfan Ametov	(Estonia) Mihhail Starodubtsev	Uhlsport	Alexela
Tammeka	(Estonia) Mario Hansi (Estonia) Kaido Koppel	(Estonia) Kaarel Kiidron	Nike	Metec
Tulevik	(Estonia) Aivar Lillevere	(Estonia) Indrek Ilves	Joma	Viljandi Aken ja Uks
Vaprus	(Estonia) Marko Lelov	(Estonia) Karl Palatu	Nike	Coolbet

=== Managerial changes ===
Team	Outgoing manager	Manner of departure	Date of vacancy	Position in table	Incoming manager	Date of appointment
Paide Linnameeskond	(Estonia) Meelis Rooba	Mutual consent	5 November 2016	Pre-season	(Estonia) Vjatšeslav Zahovaiko	7 November 2016
Flora	(Estonia) Argo Arbeiter	Sacked	10 November 2016	Pre-season	(Netherlands) Arno Pijpers	2 January 2017
Tammeka	(Estonia) Indrek Koser	Mutual consent	29 November 2016	Pre-season	(Estonia) Mario Hansi (Estonia) Kaido Koppel	29 November 2016
Sillamäe Kalev	(Lithuania) Algimantas Briaunys	Resigned	11 April 2017	8th	(Ukraine) Vadym Dobizha (caretaker)	11 April 2017
FCI Tallinn	(Estonia) Aleksandr Puštov	Mutual consent	30 June 2017	4th	(Estonia) Sergei Bragin (caretaker)	30 June 2017
FCI Tallinn	(Estonia) Sergei Bragin	End of caretaker spell	29 July 2017	4th	(Serbia) Aleksandar Rogić	29 July 2017
Sillamäe Kalev	(Ukraine) Vadym Dobizha	Resigned due to ill health	12 September 2017	7th	(Ukraine) Irfan Ametov (caretaker)	12 September 2017

== League table ==
Pos	Team	Pld	W	D	L	GF	GA	GD	Pts	Qualification or relegation
1	Flora (C)	36	28	6	2	100	28	+72	90	Qualification for the Champions League first qualifying round
2	Levadia	36	25	9	2	106	20	+86	84	Qualification for the Europa League first qualifying round (Note: Narva Trans qualified for the Europa League first qualifying round since the 2017–18 Estonian Cup winners FCI Levadia had already qualified for the competition based on their league position and FCI Tallinn merged with Levadia after the 2018 season.)
3	Nõmme Kalju	36	24	6	6	101	32	+69	78	Qualification for the Europa League first qualifying round
4	FCI Tallinn	36	20	5	11	103	47	+56	65	
5	Narva Trans	36	13	6	17	46	63	−17	45	Qualification for the Europa League first qualifying round
6	Paide Linnameeskond	36	10	8	18	47	88	−41	38	
7	Tammeka	36	9	10	17	40	63	−23	37	
8	Tulevik	36	8	4	24	34	95	−61	28	
9	Vaprus (Note: Relegation play-offs were not held as a league spot was vacated by the merger of FCI Tallinn and Levadia.)	36	2	2	32	29	146	−117	8	Qualification for the Relegation play-offs
10	Sillamäe Kalev (Note: Sillamäe Kalev were stripped of their Meistriliiga license due to financial troubles.) (R)	36	10	6	20	52	76	−24	36	Relegation to the II liiga

Source: Estonian Football Association (in Estonian), UEFA, Soccerway
Rules for classification: 1) Points; 2) Less matches awarded against; 3) Head-to-head points; 4) Head-to-head goal difference; 5) Matches won; 6) Goal difference; 7) Goals scored; 8) Away goals scored; 9) Fairplay ranking.
(C) Champions; (R) Relegated

== Results ==
Each team plays every opponent four times, twice at home and twice away. A total of 180 matches will be played, with 36 matches played by each team.

=== First half of season ===
Home \ Away	FCI	FLO	LEV	NAR	NÕM	PAI	SIL	TAM	TUL	VAP
FCI Tallinn	—	0–1	0–1	4–1	2–2	6–1	2–2	2–1	5–0	11–1
Flora	3–0	—	1–1	4–2	2–0	3–0	2–0	4–0	7–0	2–0
Levadia	1–0	0–0	—	3–1	1–1	7–0	5–0	2–1	5–0	8–0
Narva Trans	1–2	0–2	0–0	—	1–0	1–1	3–1	1–2	2–1	3–0
Nõmme Kalju	3–2	1–1	1–2	2–0	—	1–0	2–1	5–1	8–0	3–0
Paide	1–1	1–3	2–5	1–5	0–1	—	2–1	1–1	1–2	3–2
Sillamäe Kalev	1–4	0–3	1–1	1–1	1–2	2–0	—	2–0	1–0	1–3
Tammeka	2–0	0–2	0–2	1–1	1–3	0–0	1–1	—	2–1	2–1
Tulevik	0–2	0–2	0–2	1–2	0–2	2–3	1–0	1–3	—	2–1
Vaprus	0–6	0–10	1–2	0–2	2–6	0–4	1–3	1–1	2–0	—

Source: Estonian Football Association (in Estonian)
Legend: Blue = home team win; Yellow = draw; Red = away team win.

=== Second half of season ===
Home \ Away	FCI	FLO	LEV	NAR	NÕM	PAI	SIL	TAM	TUL	VAP
FCI Tallinn	—	1–3	2–1	1–3	1–2	6–1	3–0	1–1	7–0	7–1
Flora	2–4	—	3–3	1–0	0–4	3–0	3–2	2–0	3–2	3–0
Levadia	3–2	0–0	—	2–0	2–0	8–0	5–0	3–1	6–0	3–0
Narva Trans	1–3	0–7	0–0	—	0–3	0–1	1–1	3–1	1–2	3–1
Nõmme Kalju	2–4	0–1	1–1	8–1	—	2–2	8–0	1–0	5–1	6–0
Paide	1–3	1–2	0–4	3–1	0–4	—	0–3	1–1	4–2	3–2
Sillamäe Kalev	1–0	1–2	0–9	3–1	0–0	1–3	—	1–2	0–1	9–0
Tammeka	1–4	2–3	1–4	0–2	0–3	1–1	3–1	—	1–1	2–1
Tulevik	1–1	2–2	1–0	0–1	1–3	1–4	0–3	1–1	—	4–1
Vaprus	1–4	1–8	0–4	0–1	1–6	1–1	2–7	0–3	2–3	—

Source: Estonian Football Association (in Estonian)
Legend: Blue = home team win; Yellow = draw; Red = away team win.

== Season statistics ==
=== Top scorers ===
Rank	Player	Club	Goals
1	(Estonia) Albert Prosa	FCI Tallinn	27
1	(Estonia) Rauno Sappinen	Flora	27
3	(Estonia) Rimo Hunt	Levadia	20
4	(Estonia) Aleksandr Volkov	Sillamäe Kalev	18
5	(Georgia (country)) Zakaria Beglarishvili	Flora	16
5	(Russia) Yevgeni Kharin	FCI Tallinn	16
5	(Brazil) Liliu	Nõmme Kalju	16
5	(Brazil) João Morelli	Levadia	16
9	(Russia) Yevgeni Kobzar	Levadia	12
10	(Russia) Nikita Andreev	Levadia	11
10	(Estonia) Artjom Dmitrijev	Nõmme Kalju	11

=== Hat-tricks ===
Player	For	Against	Result	Date
(Belarus) Dzmitry Kowb	Narva Trans	Paide Linnameeskond	5–1 (A)	4 March 2017
(Estonia) Rimo Hunt	Levadia	Paide Linnameeskond	7–0 (H)	18 March 2017
(Russia) Yevgeni Kharin	FCI Tallinn	Vaprus	6–0 (A)	15 April 2017
(Russia) Yevgeni Kobzar	Levadia	Vaprus	8–0 (H)	28 April 2017
(Estonia) Albert Prosa^{6}	FCI Tallinn	Vaprus	11–1 (H)	22 May 2017
(Estonia) Rauno Sappinen	Flora	Vaprus	10–0 (A)	16 June 2017
(Brazil) João Morelli	Levadia	Paide Linnameeskond	8–0 (H)	5 August 2017
(Estonia) Aleksandr Volkov	Sillamäe Kalev	Vaprus	9–0 (H)	12 August 2017
(Estonia) Karl Mööl	Nõmme Kalju	Vaprus	6–1 (A)	15 August 2017
(Brazil) Liliu	Nõmme Kalju	Vaprus	6–0 (H)	23 September 2017
(Estonia) Aleksandr Volkov	Sillamäe Kalev	Vaprus	7–2 (A)	30 September 2017
(Estonia) Rauno Sappinen^{4}	Flora	Narva Trans	7–0 (A)	20 October 2017

^{4} Player scored 4 goals; ^{6} Player scored 6 goals; (H) – Home; (A) – Away

=== Average attendance ===
Club	Average attendance
Nõmme Kalju	531
Flora	477
Tammeka	320
Levadia	311
Vaprus	255
Tulevik	240
Infonet	238
Paide Linnameeskond	164
Narva Trans	143
Sillamäe Kalev	137
League average	282

== Awards ==
=== Monthly awards ===
Month	Manager of the Month		Player of the Month		Goal of the Month	
Month	Manager	Club	Player	Club	Player	Club
March	(Estonia) Igor Prins	Levadia	(Russia) Igor Dudarev	Levadia	(Estonia) Viktor Plotnikov	Narva Trans
April	(Netherlands) Arno Pijpers	Flora	(Estonia) Rimo Hunt	Levadia	(Estonia) Magnar Vainumäe	Paide Linnameeskond
May	(Netherlands) Arno Pijpers	Flora	(Estonia) Artur Kotenko	Narva Trans	(Estonia) Brent Lepistu	Flora
June	(Estonia) Mario Hansi (Estonia) Kaido Koppel	Tammeka	(Estonia) Rauno Sappinen	Flora	(Estonia) Mark Oliver Roosnupp	Levadia
July	(Russia) Sergei Frantsev	Nõmme Kalju	(Estonia) Aleksandr Volkov	Sillamäe Kalev	(Estonia) Robert Kirss	Nõmme Kalju
August	(Serbia) Aleksandar Rogić	FCI Tallinn	(Russia) Yevgeni Kobzar	Levadia	(Ukraine) Oleksandr Sukharov	Sillamäe Kalev
September	(Estonia) Igor Prins	Levadia	(Croatia) Josip Krznarić	Levadia	(Brazil) Geovane	Nõmme Kalju
October	(Netherlands) Arno Pijpers	Flora	(Estonia) Brent Lepistu	Flora	(Brazil) João Morelli	Levadia

=== Player of the Round ===
Round	Player of the Round	
Round	Player	Club
1	(Estonia) Rimo Hunt	Levadia
2	(Georgia (country)) Zakaria Beglarishvili	Flora
3	(Brazil) João Morelli	Levadia
4	(Estonia) Rauno Sappinen	Flora

=== Annual awards ===
Award	Winner	Club
Player of the Year	(Estonia) Rauno Sappinen	Flora
Goal of the Year	(Estonia) Viktor Plotnikov	Narva Trans

== See also ==
- 2016–17 Estonian Cup
- 2017–18 Estonian Cup
- 2017 Esiliiga
- 2017 Esiliiga B
