= 2018 Meistriliiga =

Estonian national championships in football

Meistriliiga
- Season: 2018
- Dates: 3 March 2018 – 10 November 2018
- Champions: Nõmme Kalju; 2nd title
- Relegated: Vaprus
- Champions League: Nõmme Kalju
- Europa League: FCI Levadia; Flora; Narva Trans
- Matches: 180
- Goals: 685 (3.81 per match)
- Top goalscorer: Liliu (31 goals)

The 2018 Meistriliiga (known as A. Le Coq Premium Liiga for sponsorship reasons) was the 28th season of the Meistriliiga, the highest division of Estonian football system. The season was scheduled to begin on 25 February 2018, but was postponed due to a cold wave. On 3 March, the season began with four out of five second round matches held in indoor arena. This marked the first time Estonian league football was played indoor. The season concluded on 10 November 2018. Flora were the defending champions. Nõmme Kalju won their 2nd Meistriliiga title completing an entire season undefeated.

== Teams ==
10 teams competed in the league. Sillamäe Kalev lost their Meistriliiga license due to a failure to meet their financial obligations and were relegated to the II liiga. On 4 November 2017, it was announced that FCI Tallinn would merge with Levadia.

The two clubs were replaced by 2017 Esiliiga champions Maardu Linnameeskond and runners-up Tallinna Kalev. On 18 December 2017, Kuressaare replaced Maardu Linnameeskond after the latter withdrew from the league due to financial reasons.

=== Venues ===
Locations of the 2018 Meistriliiga teams

Team	Location	Stadium	Capacity
FCI Levadia	Tallinn	Kadriorg Stadium	5,000
Flora	Tallinn	A. Le Coq Arena	14,405
Kuressaare	Kuressaare	Kuressaare linnastaadion	1,000
Narva Trans	Narva	Narva Kreenholmi Stadium	1,065
Nõmme Kalju	Tallinn	Hiiu Stadium	650
Paide Linnameeskond	Paide	Paide linnastaadion	268
Tallinna Kalev	Tallinn	Kalevi Keskstaadion artificial turf	570
Tammeka	Tartu	Tartu Tamme Stadium	1,500
Tulevik	Viljandi	Viljandi linnastaadion	1,084
Vaprus	Pärnu	Pärnu Rannastaadion	1,501

=== Personnel and kits ===
Team	Manager	Captain	Kit manufacturer	Shirt sponsor
FCI Levadia	(Serbia) Aleksandar Rogić	(Estonia) Dmitri Kruglov	Adidas	Viimsi Keevitus
Flora	(Estonia) Jürgen Henn	(Estonia) Gert Kams	Nike	Tele2
Kuressaare	(Estonia) Jan Važinski	(Estonia) Sander Viira	Joma	Saaremaa Lihatööstus
Narva Trans	(Turkey) Cenk Özcan	(Ivory Coast) Irié	Nike	Sportland
Nõmme Kalju	(Russia) Sergei Frantsev	(Estonia) Vitali Teleš	Adidas	help.ee
Paide Linnameeskond	(Estonia) Vjatšeslav Zahovaiko	(Estonia) Andre Frolov	Nike	Verston
Tallinna Kalev	(Estonia) Argo Arbeiter	(Japan) Hidetoshi Wakui	Nike	Coolbet
Tammeka	(Estonia) Kaido Koppel	(Estonia) Tauno Tekko	Nike	Metec
Tulevik	(Estonia) Sander Post	(Estonia) Indrek Ilves	Joma	Viljandi Aken ja Uks
Vaprus	(Estonia) Indrek Zelinski	(Estonia) Joosep Sarapuu	Nike	Coolbet

=== Managerial changes ===
Team	Outgoing manager	Manner of departure	Date of vacancy	Position in table	Incoming manager	Date of appointment
Vaprus	(Estonia) Marko Lelov	Resigned	5 November 2017	Pre-season	(Estonia) Indrek Zelinski	5 November 2017
FCI Levadia	(Estonia) Igor Prins	End of contract	5 November 2017	Pre-season	(Serbia) Aleksandar Rogić	6 November 2017
Tulevik	(Estonia) Aivar Lillevere	Resigned	15 November 2017	Pre-season	(Estonia) Marko Kristal	30 December 2017
Tallinna Kalev	(Estonia) Marko Pärnpuu	Sacked	16 November 2017	Pre-season	(Estonia) Argo Arbeiter	17 November 2017
Tammeka	(Estonia) Mario Hansi (Estonia) Kaido Koppel	Mutual consent	21 November 2017	Pre-season	(Estonia) Kaido Koppel	21 November 2017
Flora	(Netherlands) Arno Pijpers	Resigned	13 December 2017	Pre-season	(Estonia) Jürgen Henn	5 January 2018
Kuressaare	(Estonia) Sander Viira	Mutual consent	19 December 2017	Pre-season	(Estonia) Jan Važinski	19 December 2017
Tulevik	(Estonia) Marko Kristal	Mutual consent	19 April 2018	9th	(Estonia) Sander Post	19 April 2018
Narva Trans	(Russia) Adyam Kuzyaev	Resigned	14 August 2018	4th	(Turkey) Cenk Özcan	17 August 2018

== League table ==
Pos	Team	Pld	W	D	L	GF	GA	GD	Pts	Qualification or relegation
1	Nõmme Kalju (C)	36	25	11	0	114	32	+82	86	Qualification for the Champions League first qualifying round
2	FCI Levadia	36	26	6	4	109	26	+83	84	Qualification for the Europa League first qualifying round (Note: Narva Trans qualified for the Europa League since they won 2018–19 Estonian Cup.)
3	Flora	36	25	8	3	116	32	+84	83	Qualification for the Europa League first qualifying round
4	Narva Trans	36	18	7	11	76	57	+19	61	Qualification for the Europa League first qualifying round
5	Paide Linnameeskond	36	14	9	13	64	74	−10	51	
6	Tammeka	36	14	7	15	56	58	−2	49	
7	Tulevik	36	8	5	23	37	100	−63	29	
8	Tallinna Kalev	36	7	7	22	54	68	−14	28	
9	Kuressaare (O)	36	6	3	27	34	115	−81	21	Qualification for the Relegation play-offs
10	Vaprus (R)	36	2	7	27	25	123	−98	13	Relegation to the Esiliiga

Source: Estonian Football Association (in Estonian), UEFA, Soccerway
Rules for classification: 1) Points; 2) Less matches awarded against; 3) Head-to-head points; 4) Head-to-head goal difference; 5) Matches won; 6) Goal difference; 7) Goals scored; 8) Away goals scored; 9) Fairplay ranking.
(C) Champions; (O) Play-off winners; (R) Relegated

=== Relegation play-offs ===
At season's end Kuressaare, the ninth place club, participated in a two-legged play-off with the runners-up (of independent teams) of the 2018 Esiliiga, Elva, for the spot in 2019 Meistriliiga.

17 November 2018	Elva	0–1	Kuressaare	Elva
13:00 (UTC+2)		Report	Laht 50' (pen.)	Stadium: Elva linnastaadion Attendance: 235; Referee: Siim Rinken

24 November 2018	Kuressaare	1–0	Elva	Kuressaare
13:00 (UTC+2)	Saar 61'	Report		Stadium: Kuressaare linnastaadion Attendance: 152; Referee: Kristo Tohver

Kuressaare won 2–0 on aggregate and retained their Meistriliiga spot for the 2019 season.

== Results ==
Each team played every opponent four times, twice at home and twice away. A total of 180 matches has been played, with 36 matches played by each team.

=== First half of season ===
Home \ Away	FLO	KUR	LEV	NAR	NÕM	PAI	KLV	TAM	TUL	VAP
Flora	—	2–1	2–2	0–0	3–3	6–0	1–0	3–1	1–0	5–0
Kuressaare	0–7	—	1–1	0–5	0–3	1–4	1–0	0–4	3–1	1–3
FCI Levadia	2–1	4–0	—	5–0	2–2	1–1	3–0	3–1	5–0	6–1
Narva Trans	2–4	3–0	1–1	—	2–2	1–0	2–2	4–1	2–0	6–0
Nõmme Kalju	2–0	8–3	2–1	5–2	—	3–2	3–0	1–0	8–2	7–0
Paide	0–2	3–1	1–3	0–2	1–4	—	2–0	3–3	4–0	2–2
Tallinna Kalev	1–3	5–0	0–4	1–2	2–2	2–3	—	0–1	1–2	4–2
Tammeka	0–3	1–2	0–3	1–1	1–1	5–2	1–0	—	0–0	4–2
Tulevik	0–6	1–3	0–7	0–6	0–6	1–1	1–0	0–2	—	2–1
Vaprus	1–8	1–1	0–5	0–4	0–6	1–1	0–4	0–1	1–1	—

Source: Estonian Football Association (in Estonian)
Legend: Blue = home team win; Yellow = draw; Red = away team win.

=== Second half of season ===
Home \ Away	FLO	KUR	LEV	NAR	NÕM	PAI	KLV	TAM	TUL	VAP
Flora	—	4–0	3–0	2–2	2–2	7–2	3–1	5–0	4–0	3–0
Kuressaare	0–4	—	0–5	0–3	2–4	1–3	3–3	1–3	1–4	2–1
FCI Levadia	2–1	4–0	—	6–1	0–0	4–0	3–2	0–1	2–1	4–0
Narva Trans	1–2	2–1	1–2	—	0–3	1–2	3–2	2–1	4–1	1–1
Nõmme Kalju	1–1	4–0	1–0	4–1	—	0–0	1–1	2–2	4–0	4–0
Paide	3–3	2–1	1–4	2–5	0–3	—	2–2	2–1	4–1	2–1
Tallinna Kalev	2–2	3–0	1–4	0–1	0–2	1–2	—	2–1	0–2	5–0
Tammeka	0–4	6–1	0–3	2–1	0–1	1–1	2–1	—	1–0	5–0
Tulevik	1–3	1–2	0–4	4–1	2–5	0–3	2–2	3–2	—	1–1
Vaprus	0–6	3–1	0–4	0–1	0–5	0–3	2–4	1–1	0–3	—

Source: Estonian Football Association (in Estonian)
Legend: Blue = home team win; Yellow = draw; Red = away team win.

== Season statistics ==
=== Top scorers ===
Rank	Player	Club	Goals
1	(Brazil) Liliu	Nõmme Kalju	31
2	(Georgia (country)) Zakaria Beglarishvili	Flora	30
3	(Ukraine) Roman Debelko	FCI Levadia	28
4	(Estonia) Tristan Koskor	Tammeka	21
5	(Russia) Dmitri Barkov	Narva Trans	17
6	(Estonia) Frank Liivak	Flora	16
7	(Estonia) Sander Laht	Kuressaare	15
8	(Cameroon) Marcelin Gando	FCI Levadia	14
8	(Estonia) Rimo Hunt	Nõmme Kalju	14
10	(Estonia) Viktor Plotnikov	Narva Trans	13
10	(Bosnia and Herzegovina) Muamer Svraka	FCI Levadia	13

=== Hat-tricks ===
Player	For	Against	Result	Date
(Estonia) Tristan Koskor^{4}	Tammeka	Kuressaare	4–0 (A)	30 March 2018
(Ukraine) Roman Debelko	FCI Levadia	Tulevik	5–0 (H)	5 May 2018
(Brazil) Liliu	Nõmme Kalju	Vaprus	6–0 (A)	5 May 2018
(Cameroon) Marcelin Gando^{4}	FCI Levadia	Vaprus	6–1 (H)	26 May 2018
(Brazil) Liliu	Nõmme Kalju	Paide Linnameeskond	3–0 (A)	18 August 2018
(Georgia (country)) Zakaria Beglarishvili	Flora	Tulevik	3–1 (A)	3 November 2018

^{4} Player scored 4 goals

=== Average attendance ===
Club	Average attendance
Tallinna FC Flora	559
Tartu JK Tammeka	444
Nõmme Kalju FC	404
Viljandi JK Tulevik	278
FCI Levadia	262
Pärnu JK Vaprus	260
JK Narva Trans	250
JK Tallinna Kalev	199
Paide Linnameeskond	187
FC Kuressaare	113
League average	296

== Awards ==
=== Monthly awards ===
Month	Manager of the Month		Player of the Month	
Month	Manager	Club	Player	Club
March	(Russia) Sergei Frantsev	Nõmme Kalju	(Ukraine) Roman Debelko	FCI Levadia
April	(Serbia) Aleksandar Rogić	FCI Levadia	(Brazil) Liliu	Nõmme Kalju
May	(Estonia) Jürgen Henn	Flora	(Nigeria) Samson Iyede	Paide Linnameeskond
June/July	(Russia) Sergei Frantsev	Nõmme Kalju	(Estonia) Madis Vihmann	Flora
August	(Estonia) Kaido Koppel	Tammeka	(Estonia) Gert Kams	Flora
September	(Serbia) Aleksandar Rogić	FCI Levadia	(Estonia) Viktor Plotnikov	Narva Trans
October	(Estonia) Jürgen Henn	Flora	(Estonia) Herol Riiberg	Tulevik

=== Meistriliiga Player of the Year ===
Zakaria Beglarishvili was named Meistriliiga Player of the Year.

=== Goal of the Year ===
Tõnis Vihmoja's goal against Paide Linnameeskond was chosen Goal of the Year.

== Player transfers ==
- Winter 2017–18 – before the season
- Summer 2018 – during the season

== See also ==
- 2017–18 Estonian Cup
- 2018–19 Estonian Cup
- 2018 Esiliiga
- 2018 Esiliiga B
