= Luis Hartwig =

German footballer (2002)

Personal information
- Date of birth: 23 November 2002 (age 23)
- Height: 1.80 m (5 ft 11 in)
- Position: Centre-forward

Team information
- Current team: St. Pölten

Youth career
- –2015: SV Bommern 05
- 2015–2021: VfL Bochum

Senior career*
Years	Team	Apps	(Gls)
2021–2023	VfL Bochum	2	(0)
2022–2023	→ St. Pölten (loan)	28	(12)
2023–2024	Oostende	16	(1)
2024–2026	MSV Duisburg	9	(0)
2025–2026	→ VfL Bochum II (loan)	33	(12)
2026–	St. Pölten	0	(0)

International career
2019	Germany U19	1	(0)
2022	Germany U20	2	(0)
- * Club domestic league appearances and goals as of 11:44, 26 June 2026 (UTC)

Luis Hartwig (born 23 November 2002) is a German professional footballer who plays as a centre-forward for St. Pölten.

== Career ==
Hartwig made his professional debut for VfL Bochum in the 2. Bundesliga on 24 January 2021, coming on as a substitute in the 83rd minute for Simon Zoller against SV Sandhausen. The away match finished as a 1–1 draw.

For the 2022–23 season, Hartwig was loaned to SKN St. Pölten in Austria.

On 1 September 2023, Hartwig signed a three-year contract with Oostende in Belgium. After one year, he returned to Germany and signed for MSV Duisburg. After the 2024–25 season with Duisburg and limited playing time, he was loaned to VfL Bochum II for one year. After coming back to Duisburg, he left for St. Pölten.

== Personal life ==
Hartwig's father, Knut, was also a professional footballer who played in the 2. Bundesliga for Wuppertal.

== Career statistics ==
As of match played 26 June 2026

Appearances and goals by club, season and competition
Club	Season	League			National cup		Total	
Club	Season	Division	Apps	Goals	Apps	Goals	Apps	Goals
VfL Bochum	2020–21	2. Bundesliga	1	0	0	0	1	0
VfL Bochum	2021–22	Bundesliga	1	0	0	0	1	0
VfL Bochum	Total		2	0	0	0	2	0
St. Pölten (loan)	2022–23	2. Liga	28	12	2	0	30	12
K.V. Oostende	2023–24	Challenger Pro League	16	1	3	1	19	2
MSV Duisburg	2024–25	Regionalliga West	9	0	—		9	0
VfL Bochum II (loan)	2025–26	Regionalliga West	33	12	—		33	12
Career total			88	25	5	1	93	26
