= Vladimir Avilov =

Estonian footballer (born 1995)

Personal information
- Full name: Vladimir Avilov
- Date of birth: 10 March 1995 (age 31)
- Place of birth: Tallinn, Estonia
- Height: 1.88 m (6 ft 2 in)
- Position: Centre back

Team information
- Current team: FC Tallinn
- Number: 17

Youth career
- 2004–2011: Maardu
- 2010: Ajax Lasnamäe
- 2011: Infonet

Senior career*
Years	Team	Apps	(Gls)
2011–2017	FCI Tallinn U21	14	(1)
2011–2017	FCI Tallinn	199	(12)
2018–2023	Nõmme Kalju U21	14	(1)
2018–2023	Nõmme Kalju	109	(14)
2024–2025	Maardu Linnameeskond	23	(6)
2025–	FC Tallinn	37	(2)

International career^{‡}
2010	Estonia U16	2	(0)
2011	Estonia U17	4	(0)
2012	Estonia U18	1	(0)
2013	Estonia U19	6	(0)
2014–2016	Estonia U21	19	(0)
2014–2018	Estonia U23	3	(0)
2014–2016	Estonia	2	(0)
- * Club domestic league appearances and goals as of 17 November 2026 ‡ National team caps and goals as of 17 December 2018

Vladimir Avilov (born 10 March 1995) is an Estonian professional footballer who plays as a centre back for Estonian club FC Tallinn.

== Club career ==
=== Infonet ===
Avilov made his senior league debut in the Esiliiga on 3 April 2011. Infonet won the 2012 season and was promoted to the Meistriliiga, where Avilov made his debut on 2 March 2013. He won his first Meistriliiga title in the 2016 season.

=== Nõmme Kalju ===
On 21 February 2018, Avilov signed a three-year contract with Nõmme Kalju. He won his second Meistriliiga title in the 2018 season.

== International career ==
Avilov made his senior international debut for Estonia on 27 December 2014, in a 0–3 away loss to Qatar in a friendly.

== Honours ==
=== Club ===
FCI Tallinn

- Meistriliiga: 2016
- Esiliiga: 2012
- Estonian Cup: 2016–17
- Estonian Supercup: 2017

Nõmme Kalju

- Meistriliiga: 2018
- Estonian Supercup: 2019

=== Individual ===
- Meistriliiga Player of the Month: October 2022
