= Anselmi Nurmela =

Finnish footballer (born 1996)

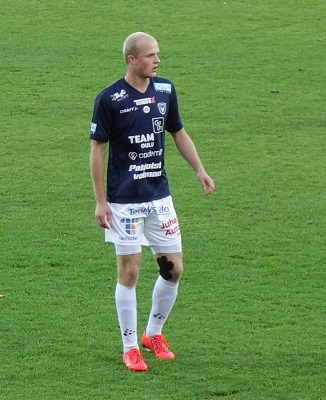
- Nurmela with AC Oulu in 2020

Personal information
- Full name: Anselmi Mikael Nurmela
- Date of birth: 22 November 1996 (age 29)
- Place of birth: Emmen, Netherlands
- Height: 1.85 m (6 ft 1 in)
- Position: Midfielder

Team information
- Current team: OLS

Youth career
- –2011: OLS
- 2012: Tervarit

Senior career*
| Years | Team | Apps | (Gls) |
| 2013–2016 | Oulu | 69 | (5) |
| 2017 | RoPS | 29 | (1) |
| 2018–2020 | Flora | 25 | (2) |
| 2020–2021 | AC Oulu | 48 | (2) |
| 2022 | Hødd | 5 | (0) |
| 2022 | Hødd 2 | 4 | (1) |
| 2022 | Hønefoss | 9 | (1) |
| 2024– | OLS | 18 | (0) |

International career^{‡}
| 2013–2014 | Finland U18 | 6 | (1) |
| 2014 | Finland U19 | 4 | (0) |
| 2016 | Finland U20 | 1 | (0) |
| 2017–2018 | Finland U21 | 9 | (0) |
- * Club domestic league appearances and goals as of 9 October 2024 ‡ National team caps and goals as of 16 October 2018

Anselmi Mikael Nurmela (born 22 November 1996) is a Finnish professional footballer who plays as a midfielder for OLS.

== Club career ==
In 2016 Nurmela played 22 games for AC Oulu in the Finnish 1st Division Ykkönen before joining top division Veikkausliiga outfit Rovaniemen Palloseura. In 2017, Nurmela made 24 starts and five substitute appearances in the Finnish top division. In February 2018, Nurmela joined FC Flora in Estonia. With Flora Nurmela won the 2019 Estonian league title making 18 appearances and scoring two goals.

== International career ==
On 24 March 2017, he made his debut with the Finland national under-21 football team in a friendly against Netherlands.

== Personal life ==
He is the son of former Finnish international Mika Nurmela.

== Career statistics ==
As of 8 October 2024.

Appearances and goals by club, season and competition
| Club | Season | League | | | Cup (Note: Includes Suomen Cup, Estonian Cup and Norwegian Football Cup) | | Europe | | Total | |
| Club | Season | Division | Apps | Goals | Apps | Goals | Apps | Goals | Apps | Goals |
|---|---|---|---|---|---|---|---|---|---|---|
| AC Oulu | 2013 | Ykkönen | 3 | 0 | – | | – | | 3 | 0 |
| AC Oulu | 2014 | Ykkönen | 25 | 3 | 2 | 1 | – | | 27 | 4 |
| AC Oulu | 2015 | Ykkönen | 19 | 0 | 3 | 0 | – | | 22 | 0 |
| AC Oulu | 2016 | Ykkönen | 22 | 2 | 1 | 0 | – | | 23 | 2 |
| AC Oulu | Total | | 69 | 5 | 6 | 1 | 0 | 0 | 75 | 6 |
| OLS | 2016 | Kolmonen | 1 | 0 | – | | – | | 1 | 0 |
| RoPS | 2017 | Veikkausliiga | 29 | 1 | 5 | 0 | – | | 34 | 1 |
| Flora Tallinn | 2018 | Meistriliiga | 11 | 0 | 6 | 0 | – | | 17 | 0 |
| Flora Tallinn | 2019 | Meistriliiga | 14 | 2 | 3 | 0 | 0 | 0 | 17 | 2 |
| Flora Tallinn | Total | | 25 | 2 | 9 | 0 | 0 | 0 | 34 | 2 |
| Flora II | 2018 | Esiliiga | 11 | 0 | – | | – | | 11 | 0 |
| Flora II | 2019 | Esiliiga | 1 | 0 | – | | – | | 1 | 0 |
| Flora II | Total | | 12 | 0 | 0 | 0 | 0 | 0 | 12 | 0 |
| AC Oulu | 2020 | Ykkönen | 21 | 2 | 5 | 0 | – | | 26 | 2 |
| AC Oulu | 2021 | Veikkausliiga | 27 | 0 | 3 | 0 | – | | 30 | 0 |
| AC Oulu | Total | | 48 | 2 | 8 | 0 | 0 | 0 | 56 | 2 |
| Hødd | 2022 | 2. divisjon | 5 | 0 | 2 | 0 | – | | 7 | 0 |
| Hødd 2 | 2022 | 3. divisjon | 4 | 1 | – | | – | | 4 | 1 |
| Hønefoss | 2022 | 3. divisjon | 9 | 1 | – | | – | | 9 | 1 |
| OLS | 2024 | Ykkönen | 18 | 0 | – | | – | | 18 | 0 |
| Career total | | | 220 | 12 | 30 | 1 | 0 | 0 | 250 | 13 |

== Honours ==
AC Oulu

- Ykkönen: 2020

Flora

- Meistriliiga: 2019
