= Brent Lepistu =

Estonian footballer

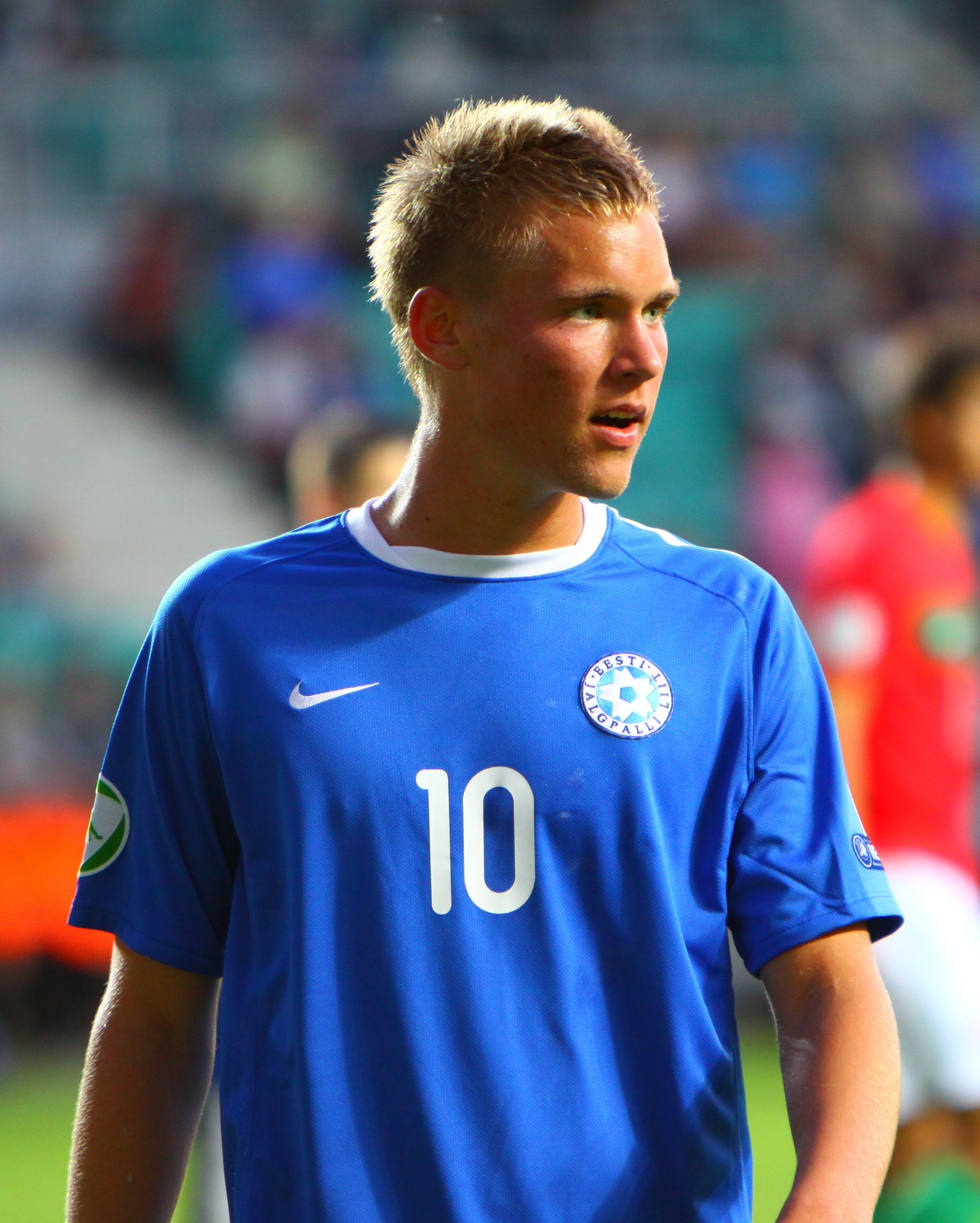
- Lepistu with Estonia U19 at the 2012 UEFA European Under-19 Championship

Personal information
- Date of birth: 26 March 1993 (age 33)
- Place of birth: Tallinn, Estonia
- Height: 1.85 m (6 ft 1 in)
- Position: Midfielder

Team information
- Current team: Paide Linnameeskond III
- Number: 23

Youth career
- 2002–2011: Flora

Senior career*
Years	Team	Apps	(Gls)
2012	Flora III	1	(0)
2010–2016	Flora U21	89	(6)
2013–2017	Flora	113	(12)
2009–2010	→ Elva (loan)	13	(2)
2009	→ Warrior (loan)	3	(0)
2018–2019	Kristiansund	15	(0)
2019	FC Lahti	9	(0)
2020–2023	FCI Levadia	90	(8)
2023	Mioveni	8	(0)
2023–2025	FCI Levadia	42	(3)
2026–	Paide Linnameeskond III		

International career^{‡}
2007	Estonia U15	2	(0)
2008	Estonia U16	1	(0)
2009	Estonia U17	2	(0)
2010–2011	Estonia U18	4	(0)
2011–2012	Estonia U19	12	(0)
2013–2014	Estonia U21	21	(1)
2014–2016	Estonia U23	4	(1)
2014–2019	Estonia	13	(0)
- * Club domestic league appearances and goals as of 21 June 2026 ‡ National team caps and goals as of 26 March 2019

Brent Lepistu (born 26 March 1993) is an Estonian former professional footballer who currently plays for the amateur IV liiga club Paide Linnameeskond III as a midfielder.

== Club career ==
=== Flora ===
Lepistu came through the Flora youth system. He moved to Esiliiga club Warrior on loan for the 2009 season. On 17 April 2013, Lepistu made his debut for Flora's first team in a 6–0 away win over Pärnu Linnameeskond in the Estonian Cup quarter-finals. He made his debut in the Meistriliiga on 21 May 2013, in a 6–0 victory over Kuressaare at A. Le Coq Arena. Lepistu won his first Meistriliiga title in the 2015 season. In February 2017, Lepistu was named club captain by manager Arno Pijpers. He won his second Meistriliiga title in the 2017 season.

=== Kristiansund ===
On 20 December 2017, Lepistu signed a two-and-a-half-year contract with Norwegian Eliteserien club Kristiansund.

=== FC Lahti ===
On 31 July 2019, Lepistu signed a half-year contract with Finnish Veikkausliiga club FC Lahti.

== International career ==
Lepistu began his youth career in 2009 with the Estonia under-17 team. He represented the under-19 team at the 2012 UEFA European Under-19 Championship in Estonia. Lepistu played in every group stage match, but failed to help the team progress to the semi-finals as Estonia lost all three games against Portugal, Greece and Spain. He also represented the under-21, and under-23 national sides.

Lepistu made his senior international debut for Estonia on 27 December 2014, in a 0–3 away loss to Qatar in a friendly.

== Personal life ==
In 2022, Lepistu began dating tennis player Anett Kontaveit. He and Kontaveit have one son together, born in September 2024.

== Career statistics ==
=== International ===
As of match played 26 March 2019

Appearances and goals by national team and year
National team	Year	Apps	Goals
Estonia
Estonia	2014	1	0
Estonia	2015	0	0
Estonia	2016	2	0
Estonia	2017	5	0
Estonia	2018	3	0
Estonia	2019	2	0
Total		13	0

== Honours ==
Flora U21

- Esiliiga: 2014, 2015

Flora

- Meistriliiga: 2015, 2017
- Estonian Cup: 2012–13, 2015–16
- Estonian Supercup: 2014, 2016

Levadia

- Meistriliiga: 2021
- Estonian Cup: 2020–21
- Estonian Supercup: 2022

Estonia

- Baltic Cup runner-up: 2018

Individual

- Meistriliiga Player of the Month: October 2017, October 2020,
- Meistriliiga Goal of the Month: May 2017
