= George Davies (footballer, born 1996) =

Sierra Leonean footballer

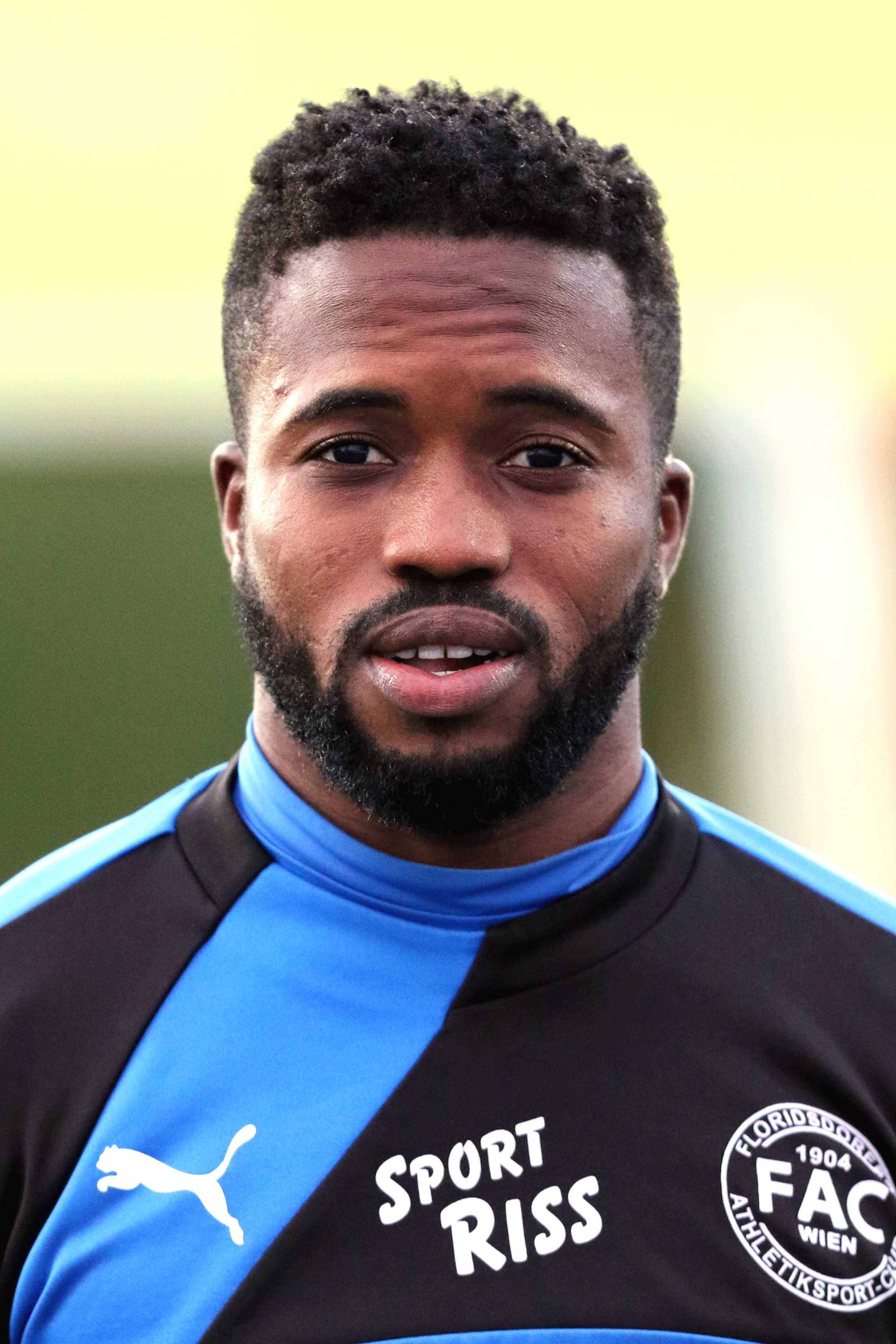

Personal information
- Full name: George Kweku Davies
- Date of birth: 16 November 1996 (age 29)
- Place of birth: Freetown, Sierra Leone
- Height: 1.68 m (5 ft 6 in)
- Position: Left midfielder

Team information
- Current team: SKU Amstetten
- Number: 11

Youth career
- 2011–2012: FC Johansen
- 2012: Right to Dream Academy
- 2012–2014: Manchester City
- 2014: Greuther Fürth

Senior career*
Years	Team	Apps	(Gls)
2014–2017	Greuther Fürth	9	(0)
2017	→ Floridsdorfer AC (loan)	15	(1)
2017–2023	St. Pölten	87	(8)
2018	→ Riga FC (loan)	18	(0)
2023–2024	Admira Wacker	37	(6)
2025	SV Stripfing	13	(0)
2025–	SKU Amstetten	13	(0)

International career^{‡}
2013–	Sierra Leone	11	(0)
- * Club domestic league appearances and goals as of 17 May 2026 ‡ National team caps and goals as of 07:49, 27 May 2024 (UTC)

George Kweku Davies (born 16 November 1996) is a Sierra Leonean prfessional footballer who plays as a left midfielder for SKU Amstetten.

== Club career ==
Davies has played youth football in Sierra Leone, Ghana and England for FC Johansen, Right to Dream Academy and Manchester City.

Davies joined the youth team of German club Greuther Fürth in August 2014. In November 2014 he signed a professional contract with them which runs until June 2019. Davies made his first team league debut for the club on 16 December 2014 as a 71st-minute substitute in a 0-0 draw with VfL Bochum.

In January 2017 Davies joined the Austrian club Floridsdorfer AC on loan. On 19 July 2017, he joined SKN St. Pölten.

== International career ==
After receiving his first call up to the Sierra Leone national team in August 2012, Davies made his senior international debut in 2013.
