= Kévin Monzialo =

Congolese footballer (born 2000)

Personal information
- Full name: Kévin Monzialo Bokolo
- Date of birth: 28 July 2000 (age 26)
- Place of birth: Pontoise, France
- Height: 1.84 m (6 ft 0 in)
- Position: Forward

Team information
- Current team: Den Bosch
- Number: 8

Youth career
- 2006–2013: Cergy Pontoise
- 2013–2018: Caen

Senior career*
| Years | Team | Apps | (Gls) |
| 2018 | Caen II | 1 | (0) |
| 2018–2021 | Juventus | 0 | (0) |
| 2019 | → Juventus U23 (res.) | 1 | (0) |
| 2019–2020 | → Grasshopper (loan) | 7 | (0) |
| 2020–2021 | → Lugano (loan) | 2 | (0) |
| 2021–2022 | Lugano | 5 | (0) |
| 2022 | → St. Pölten (loan) | 12 | (1) |
| 2022–2024 | St. Pölten | 49 | (2) |
| 2024– | Den Bosch | 51 | (17) |

International career
| 2018 | France U18 | 2 | (0) |
| 2022– | Congo | 1 | (0) |
- * Club domestic league appearances and goals as of 25 April 2026

Kévin Monzialo Bokolo (born 28 July 2000) is a professional footballer who plays as a forward for Eerste Divisie club Den Bosch. Born in France, he plays for the Congo national team.

== Club career ==
=== Juventus ===
Monzialo joined Juventus from Stade Malherbe Caen in August 2018. On 18 April 2019 he made his professional debut in Serie C for Juventus U23 in a game against Gozzano, substituting Nicolò Pozzebon in the 85th minute.

==== Loan to Grasshoppers ====
On 16 August 2019, he joined Swiss club Grasshopper Club Zürich on a season-long loan with an option to buy.

=== Lugano ===
On 12 October 2020, he was loaned to Swiss club Lugano. The transfer was made permanent on 22 January 2021.

==== Loan to St. Pölten ====
On 19 January 2022, Monzialo joined St. Pölten in Austria on loan.

=== Den Bosch ===
On 5 August 2024, Monzialo signed a two-year contract with Den Bosch in the Netherlands.

== International career ==
Born in France, Monzialo is of Congolese descent. He is a youth international for France. He was called up to the Congo national team for a set of friendlies in September 2022. He debuted with the Congo in a friendly 3–3 tie with Madagascar on 24 September 2022.
