= NV Arena =

Football stadium in Sankt Pölten, Austria

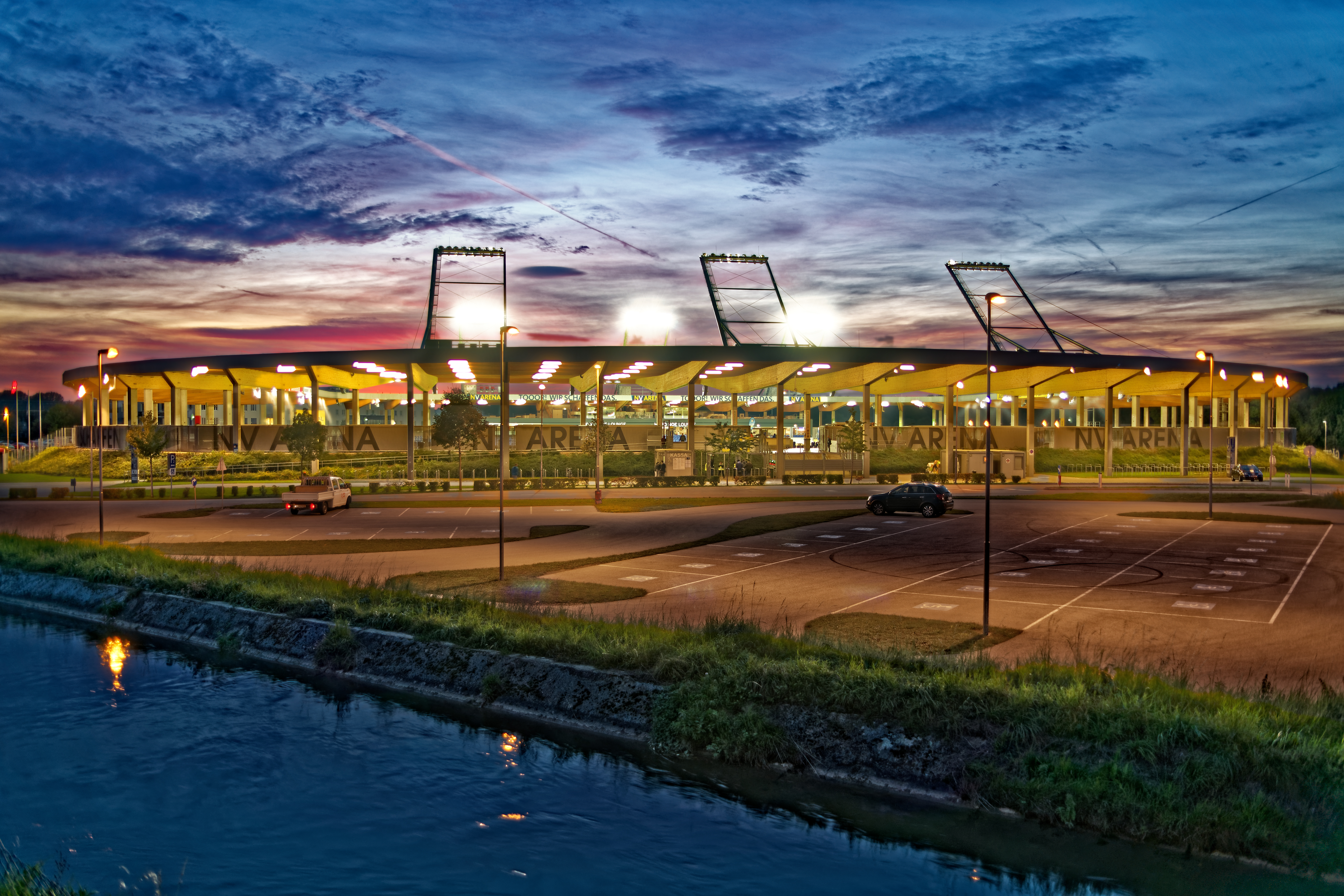
- Exterior of the stadium in 2017
- Interactive map of NV Arena
- Location: Sankt Pölten, Lower Austria
- Coordinates: 48.2209°N 15.6531°E
- Owner: SKN St. Pölten
- Capacity: 8,012 (football)

Construction
- Groundbreaking: January 2011
- Built: 2011–2012
- Opened: 7 July 2012
- Architects: agn Niederberghaus & Partner

Tenant
- SKN St. Pölten

The NV Arena is a football stadium located in Sankt Pölten, Lower Austria, Austria. It is the home stadium of SKN St. Pölten. It was built from January 2011 to July 2012, and opened on 7 July 2012. The capacity is 8,000 (extendible to 13,000 spectators). The stadium has hosted the Austrian Football League championship final (Austrian Bowl) several times.
