= Jaden Montnor =

Surinamese footballer (born 2002)

Personal information
- Full name: Jaden Sean Montnor
- Date of birth: 9 August 2002 (age 24)
- Place of birth: Amsterdam, Netherlands
- Height: 1.91 m (6 ft 3 in)
- Position: Forward

Team information
- Current team: Omonia
- Number: 7

Youth career
- Zeeburgia
- 2013–2015: Utrecht
- 2015–2019: AZ Alkmaar
- 2019–2020: Zeeburgia
- 2020–2021: Almere City
- 2021: St. Pölten

Senior career*
Years	Team	Apps	(Gls)
2021–2022	St. Pölten Juniors	19	(17)
2021–2023	St. Pölten	32	(8)
2023–2026	Aris Limassol	97	(22)
2026–	Omonia	8	(1)

International career^{‡}
2024–	Suriname	10	(3)
- * Club domestic league appearances and goals as of 1 November 2026 ‡ National team caps and goals as of 10 June 2025

Jaden Sean Montnor (born 9 August 2002) is a professional footballer who plays as a forward for Omonia. Born in the Netherlands, he plays for the Suriname national team.

== Career ==
Having moved to Austria to sign for St. Pölten in 2021, Montnor's career got off to a strong start, scoring 17 goals in 19 appearances in his first season with the Juniors team in 1. Niederösterreichische Landesliga. As a result of this stellar form, he was handed his first team debut, and signed a new contract in June 2022.

Montnor joined Cypriot champions Aris Limassol in July 2023. On 26 July, he scored his first goal for the club, coming on as a substitute in a Champions League qualifier against BATE Borisov, and making it 5–2 for Aris.

== Personal life ==
Born in Amsterdam, Montnor is of Surinamese and Indonesian descent.

== Career statistics ==
=== Club ===
As of 23 May 2026

Appearances and goals by club, season and competition
Club	Season	League			Cup		Continental		Other		Total	
Club	Season	Division	Apps	Goals	Apps	Goals	Apps	Goals	Apps	Goals	Apps	Goals
St. Pölten Juniors	2021–22	1. Niederösterreichische Landesliga	19	17	—		—		—		19	17
St. Pölten	2021–22	2. Liga	4	0	0	0	—		—		4	0
St. Pölten	2022–23	2. Liga	28	8	2	0	—		—		30	8
St. Pölten	Total		32	8	2	0	—		—		34	8
Aris Limassol	2023–24	Cypriot First Division	33	8	4	1	11	1	1	0	49	10
Aris Limassol	2024–25	Cypriot First Division	31	5	2	2	—		—		33	7
Aris Limassol	2025–26	Cypriot First Division	33	9	2	0	4	1	—		39	10
Aris Limassol	Total		97	22	8	3	15	2	1	0	121	27
Career total			148	47	10	3	15	2	1	0	174	52

=== International ===
As of match played 9 September 2024

Appearances and goals by national team and year
National team	Year	Apps	Goals
Suriname	2024	5	2
Total		5	2
