= Liliu =

Brazilian footballer (born 1990)

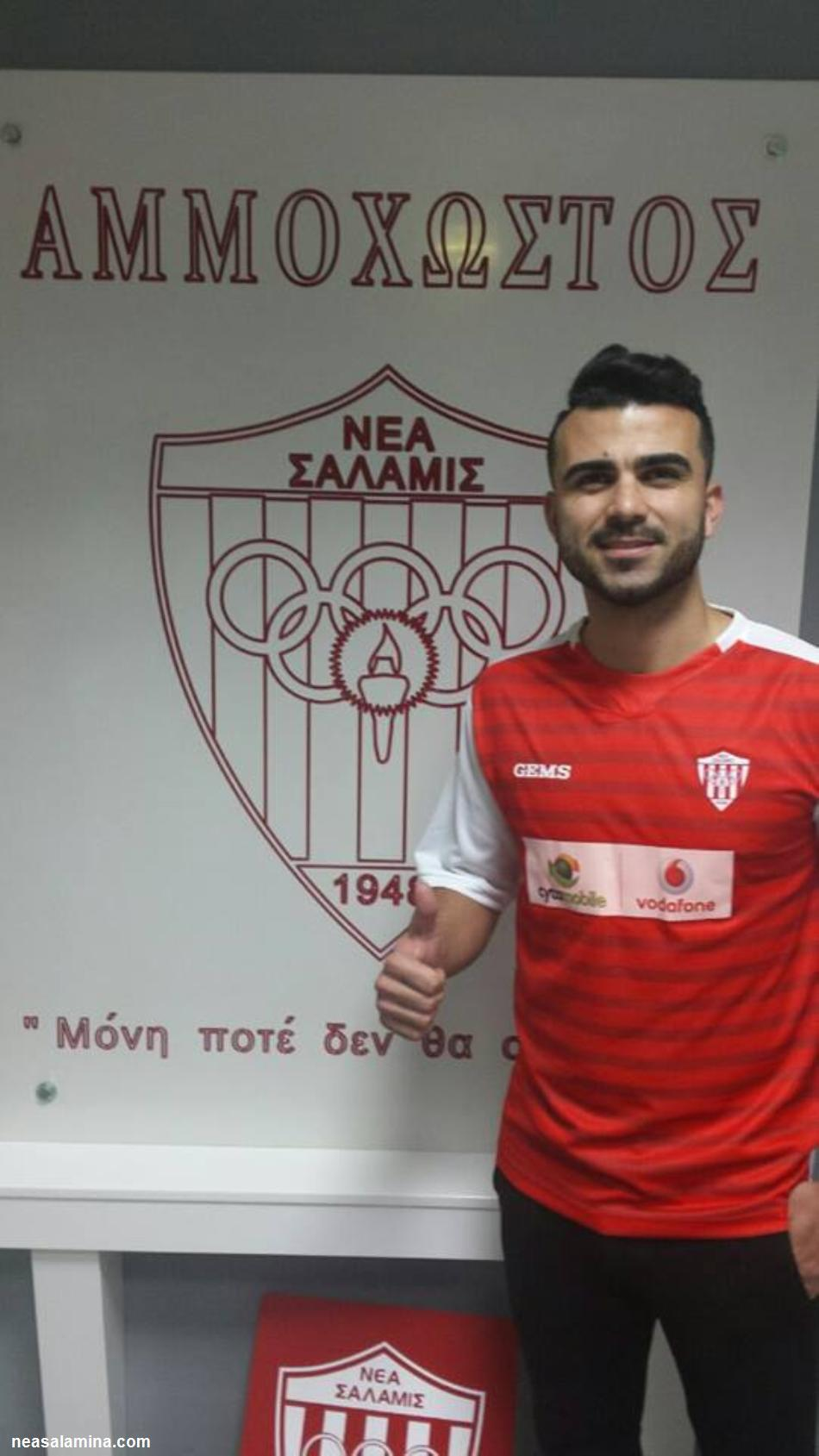

Personal information
- Full name: Ellinton Antonio Costa Morais
- Date of birth: 30 March 1990 (age 36)
- Place of birth: Bauru, Brazil
- Height: 1.81 m (5 ft 11 in)
- Position: Forward

Team information
- Current team: Altos

Senior career*
Years	Team	Apps	(Gls)
2009–2012	KVC Westerlo	35	(9)
2012	Al Naser	22	(?)
2013	CRB	0	(0)
2013	EC Rio Verde	1	(0)
2013	Ethnikos Achna	15	(5)
2014	Hapoel Ra'anana	7	(0)
2014–2015	Birkirkara	33	(17)
2016	Nea Salamina	14	(0)
2016	Gżira United	4	(2)
2017–2019	Nõmme Kalju	68	(56)
2019	Brommapojkarna	8	(1)
2020	Inter Turku	17	(1)
2021–2022	Sport Huancayo	19	(5)
2022	FCI Levadia	23	(9)
2023–	Paraná	7	(5)
2023	→ Altos (loan)	3	(0)
2024–	PSTC	6	(0)
- * Club domestic league appearances and goals as of 17:05, 27 July 2024

Ellinton Antonio Costa Morais (born 30 March 1990), known as Liliu, is a Brazilian footballer who plays for PSTC, on loan from Paraná Clube.

== Career ==
=== KVC Westerlo ===
Liliu scored on his league debut against Cercle Brugge on 14 March 2010, scoring in the 50th minute.

=== CRB ===
Liliu made his debut against Campinense in the Copa do Nordeste on 30 January 2013. He scored his first goal against Feirense FC on 2 February 2013, scoring in the 85th minute.

=== EC Rio Verde ===
Liliu made his league debut against Goianésia on 3 March 2013.

=== Ethnikos Achna ===
Liliu made his league debut against AEL Limassol on 1 September 2013. He scored his first league goal against AEK Larnaca on 15 September 2013, scoring in the 34th minute.

=== Hapoel Ra'anana ===
Liliu made his league debut against Hapoel Tel Aviv on 18 January 2014.

=== Birkirkara ===
Liliu scored on his league debut against Pietà Hotspurs on 16 August 2014, scoring in the 77th minute.

=== Nea Salamina ===
Liliu made his league debut against Pafos on 18 January 2016.

=== Gżira United ===
Liliu made his league debut against Mosta on 17 September 2016. He scored his first league goal against Pembroke Athleta on 22 September 2016, scoring in the 79th minute.

=== Nõmme Kalju ===
On 3 July 2017, Liliu signed a contract with Estonian club Nõmme Kalju. He scored on his league debut against Vaprus on 9 July 2017, scoring in the 42nd and 58th minute.

Kalju won the 2018 Meistriliiga title with Liliu taking the league's top scorer title with 31 goals.

=== Brommapojkarna ===
On 7 August 2019, Liliu signed a contract with Swedish club Brommapojkarna. He made his league debut against Östers IF on 18 August 2019. Liliu scored his first league goal against Örgryte on 28 September 2019, scoring in the 90th+1st minute. He left at the end of the year.

=== Inter Turku ===
Liliu made his league debut against Rovaniemen Palloseura on 2 July 2020. He scored his first league goal against Haka on 26 July 2020, scoring in the 2nd minute.

=== Sport Huancayo ===
Liliu made his league debut against Deportivo Municipal on 12 March 2021. He scored his first league goal against Alianza Universidad on 3 May 2021, scoring in the 47th minute.

=== FCI Levadia ===
Liliu made his league debut against Tallinna Kalev on 1 March 2022. His first goals for the club was a hattrick against Vaprus on 5 March 2022.

=== Paraná Clube ===
On 5 April 2023, Liliu was announced as a player for Paraná Clube. Liliu scored 5 goals in his first 6 games for the team from the city of Curitiba. Between September 2023 and March 2024, he was loaned to Altos and PSTC during the period when Paraná Clube had no matches on calendar.

=== Loan to Altos ===
Liliu made his league debut against São Bernardo on 8 July 2023.

=== Loan to PSTC ===
Liliu made his league debut against Coritiba on 18 January 2024.

== Honours ==
FCI Levadia

- Estonian Supercup: 2022

Individual

- Meistriliiga Player of the Month: April 2018,
- Meistriliiga Top Score: 2018
