= Samson Iyede =

Nigerian footballer (born 1998)

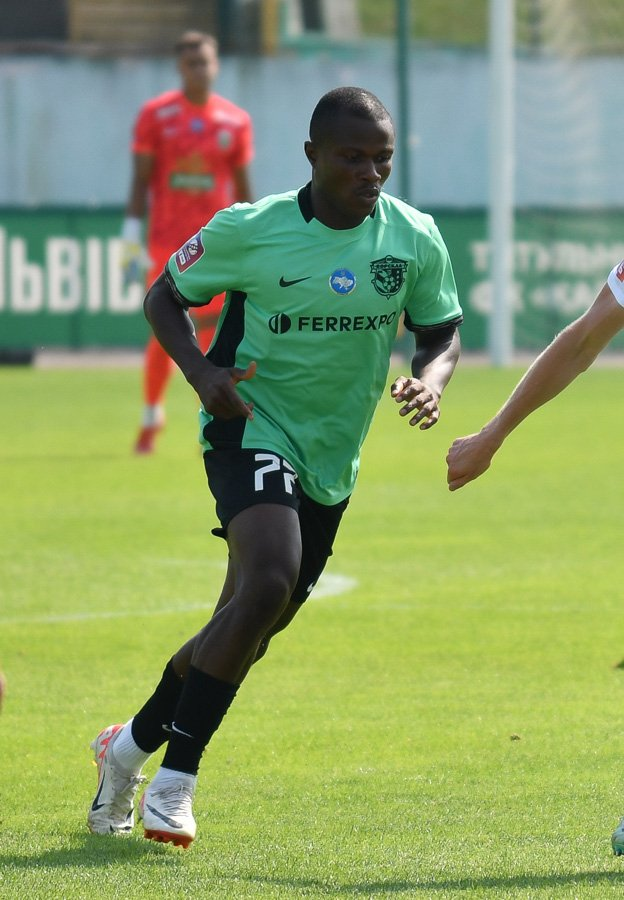

Personal information
- Full name: Samson Iyede Onomigho
- Date of birth: 28 January 1998 (age 28)
- Place of birth: Orogun, Delta State, Nigeria
- Height: 1.80 m (5 ft 11 in)
- Position: Forward

Team information
- Current team: Irtysh Pavlodar
- Number: 45

Youth career
- –2015: Ebedei
- 2016–2017: Midtjylland

Senior career*
Years	Team	Apps	(Gls)
2017–2018	Paide	36	(12)
2018–2020	Fremad Amager	46	(12)
2020	→ Lommel (loan)	3	(0)
2021–2022	Fredericia	47	(10)
2022–2024	Horsens	18	(0)
2023–2024	→ Chornomorets Odesa (loan)	25	(2)
2024–2025	Vorskla Poltava	28	(3)
2025	Novi Pazar	5	(2)
2026	Zhenis	9	(1)
2026–	Irtysh Pavlodar	1	(0)
- * Club domestic league appearances and goals as of 2 July 2026

Samson Iyede Onomigho (born 28 January 1998) is a Nigerian footballer currently playing as a forward for Irtysh Pavlodar in the Kazakhstan Premier League.

== Career ==
=== Loan to Chornomorets Odesa ===
On 25 July 2023 Iyede went on loan to Chornomorets Odesa.

== Career statistics ==
=== Club ===
As of 4 July 2020.

Club	Season	League			Cup		Continental		Other		Total	
Club	Season	Division	Apps	Goals	Apps	Goals	Apps	Goals	Apps	Goals	Apps	Goals
Paide	2019	Meistriliiga	19	4	0	0	–		0	0	19	4
Paide	2020	Meistriliiga	17	8	0	0	–		0	0	1	1
Paide	Total		36	12	0	0	0	0	0	0	36	12
Fremad Amager	2018–19	NordicBet Liga	30	8	0	0	–		0	0	30	8
Fremad Amager	2019–20	NordicBet Liga	16	4	1 (Note: Appearance(s) in Danish Cup)	0	–		0	0	17	4
Fremad Amager	Total		46	12	1	0	0	0	0	0	47	12
Lommel (loan)	2019–20	Proximus League	3	0	0	0	–		0	0	3	0
Career total			85	24	1	0	0	0	0	0	86	24

== Honours ==
=== Individual ===
- Meistriliiga Player of the Month: May 2018
