= Herol Riiberg =

Estonian footballer

Personal information
- Full name: Herol Riiberg
- Date of birth: 14 April 1997 (age 29)
- Place of birth: Tallinn, Estonia
- Height: 1.77 m (5 ft 10 in)
- Position: Attacking midfielder

Youth career
- 2006–2009: FC Joker
- 2010–2012: Flora

Senior career*
Years	Team	Apps	(Gls)
2013–2021	Flora	55	(18)
2013–2019	Flora U21	37	(10)
2017	→ Tulevik (loan)	20	(6)
2018	→ Tulevik (loan)	14	(4)
2020–2021	→ Tulevik (loan)	52	(8)
2022–2024	Paide Linnameeskond	52	(4)
2022–2024	Paide Linnameeskond U21	33	(18)

International career^{‡}
2012	Estonia U16	2	(0)
2012–2013	Estonia U17	13	(1)
2014	Estonia U18	2	(1)
2014–2015	Estonia U19	23	(6)
2017–2018	Estonia U21	8	(1)
2019	Estonia U23	1	(0)
- * Club domestic league appearances and goals as of 3 January 2025 ‡ National team caps and goals as of 19 June 2020

Herol Riiberg (born 14 April 1997) is an Estonian professional footballer who plays as an attacking midfielder.

== Honours ==
=== Club ===
Flora

- Meistriliiga: 2015, 2017, 2019
- Estonian Cup: 2015–16
- Estonian Supercup: 2014, 2016

=== Individual ===
- Meistriliiga Player of the Month: October 2018
