= Arno Pijpers =

Dutch football manager (born 1959)

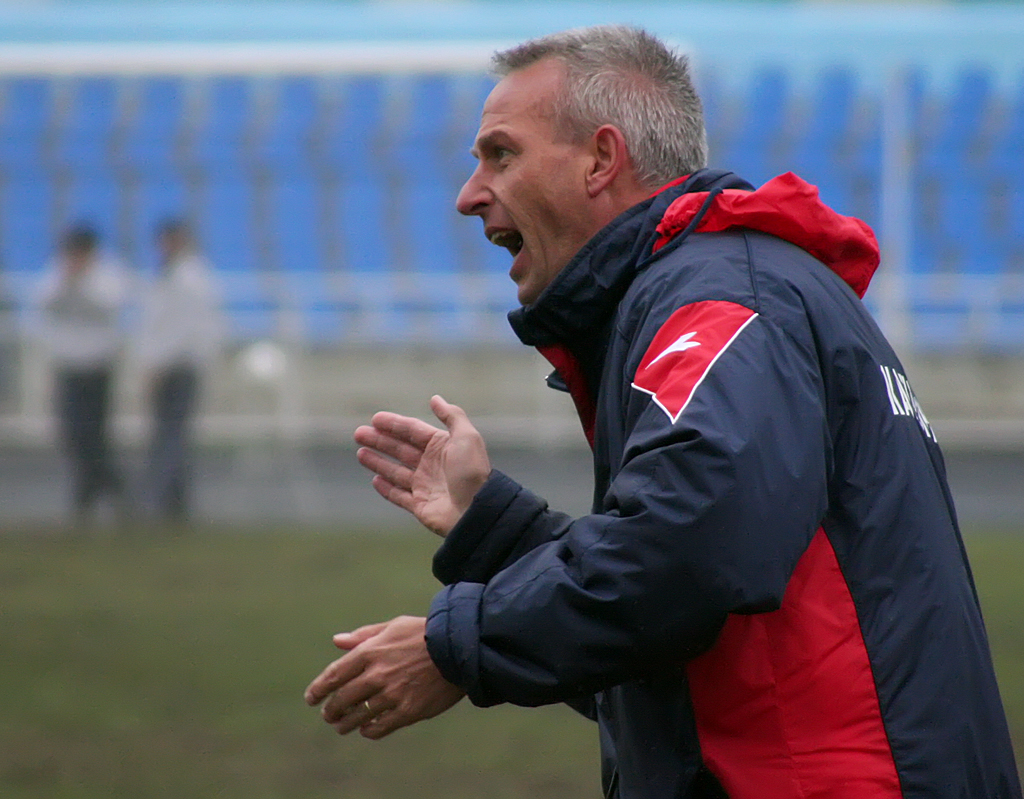

Personal information
- Full name: Arnoldus Dick Pijpers
- Date of birth: 21 April 1959 (age 67)
- Place of birth: Rotterdam, Netherlands
- Position: Midfielder

Senior career*
| Years | Team | Apps | (Gls) |
- Feyenoord
- Papendrecht

Managerial career
- 1981–1982: Excelsior
- 1982–1987: Olympia Gouda
- 2000–2004: Flora
- 2000–2005: Estonia
- 2005–2008: Kazakhstan
- 2006: Astana-1964
- 2008–2010: Zenit-2 Saint Petersburg
- 2010: Willem II
- 2012–2013: Estonia U19
- 2013–2014: Taraz
- 2017: Flora
- 2018: Flora
- 2024-: Estonia (assistant)
- * Club domestic league appearances and goals

Arnoldus Dick Pijpers (born 21 April 1959) is a Dutch football manager, who was the manager of Estonian top tier club Flora in 2018.

He worked for the Royal Dutch Football Association as a youth coach, before taking up a dual role in being the coach of Estonian club Flora and the Estonia national football team in 2000. After the end of his contract, he joined Eredivisie club FC Utrecht as a technical director, before going to Kazakhstan in 2005. At the same time he coached FC Astana for the 2006 season, winning the Kazakhstan Super League title. He was fired as manager of Kazakhstan in September 2008. In 2010, he had a short stint as a coach in the Netherlands for Willem II.

== Career ==
=== Estonia National Team ===
Pijpers led Estonia first in World Cup 2002 qualification with two wins over Andorra and two draws with Cyprus. He achieved almost the same result in Euro 2004 qualification beating twice Andorra again, and drawing with Croatia (away) and Bulgaria (home). At World Cup 2006 qualification Pijpers won the first two games against Liechtenstein and Luxembourg. However the contract was terminated mutually with national team after a conflict with the FC Flora chairman Aivar Pohlak, who was the head of the Estonian Football Association at that time. All together under Pijpers the Estonian national team played 55 games winning 16 and drawing 14 (29.09% of winning).

=== Kazakhstan National Team ===
Pijpers led Kazakhstan in their first European campaign in Euro 2008 qualification. They recorded wins over Serbia (home) and Armenia (away) and drew both matches against Belgium and Azerbaijan. Pijpers then extended his contract until the end of World Cup 2010 qualification and Kazakhstan proved to be very ambitious with the board feeling that they could qualify for the FIFA World Cup. Pijpers however disagreed and after a poor start to the 2010 FIFA World Cup qualification campaign, he was fired by the Kazakhstan Football Association as they felt he was not being aggressive enough. All together under Pijpers the Kazakhstan national team played 36 games winning seven and drawing 11 (19.44% of winning).

=== Alma-Ata ===
In July 2007, whilst continuing as Kazakhstan's Manager, Pijpers took up the role as Consultant at FC Alma-Ata in preparation for their UEFA Cup debut.

=== Estonia ===
The Dutchman returned to Estonia in late 2011 and became the technical director to help coordinate, analyze and guide the training operations across different senior and youth national teams. On 8 March 2012, he was appointed as the head coach of Estonia's under-19 national team for the 2012 UEFA European Under-19 Football Championship.

== Titles ==
As a manager

- Third place at European U-16 Championship: 2000
- Champion of Estonian League: 2001, 2002, 2003, 2017
- Winner of Estonian SuperCup: 2002, 2003, 2017
- Champion of Kazakhstan League: 2006

== Awards ==
As a manager

- Order of the Cross of Terra Mariana: 2008
- Meistriliiga Manager of the Month: April 2017, May 2017, October 2017
