= Moussa Ouattara (footballer, born 1988) =

Ivorian footballer

Moussa Outtara
Personal information
- Full name: Boliguibia Moussa Outtara
- Date of birth: 2 July 1988 (age 38)
- Place of birth: Bondoukou, Ivory Coast
- Height: 1.86 m (6 ft 1 in)
- Position: Centre-back

Youth career
- Sabé Sports

Senior career*
Years	Team	Apps	(Gls)
2006–2008	Sabé Sports		
2008–2009	ASEC Mimosas		
2009–2010	Santos Ouagadougou		
2010–2011	Al-Arabi		
2011–2012	FC Khimki	1	(0)
2012–2013	Al-Ramtha		
2013–2014	Al-Wehdat		
2014–2015	Korona Kielce	9	(0)
2017	OPS	19	(3)
2017	Kajaanin Haka	4	(0)
2018	Paide Linnameeskond	13	(0)
2018–2019	Al-Ansar		
2019–2022	Sur SC		
2022–2025	Les Ulis		
- * Club domestic league appearances and goals as of 23 June 2018

Boliguibia Moussa Outtara (born 2 July 1988) is an Ivorian professional footballer who plays as a centre-back.

== Career ==
During the 2011–12 season, Ouattara made one appearance for the Russian club FK Khimki.

On 22 February 2018, he signed for Estonian Meistriliiga club Paide Linnameeskond.
