= Karim Conté =

Guinean footballer (born 1999)

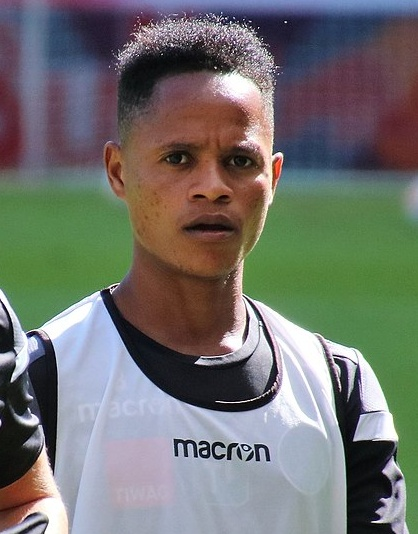

Personal information
- Full name: Abdoul Karim Conté
- Date of birth: 25 August 1999 (age 27)
- Place of birth: Conakry, Guinea
- Height: 1.71 m (5 ft 7 in)
- Position: Midfielder

Team information
- Current team: Hertha Wels
- Number: 22

Youth career
- Aspire Academy

Senior career*
Years	Team	Apps	(Gls)
2018	Tallinna Kalev	17	(0)
2018–2021	FC Wacker Innsbruck II	21	(0)
2018–2021	FC Wacker Innsbruck	40	(0)
2021–2023	St. Pölten	44	(0)
2023–2025	Nkufo Academy Sports		
2025	SV Horn	13	(0)
2025–	Hertha Wels	26	(1)

International career
- Guinea U19
- * Club domestic league appearances and goals as of 17 May 2026

Abdoul Karim Conté (born 25 August 1999) is a Guinean footballer who plays for Austrian side Hertha Wels.

== Club career ==
On 14 August 2021, he signed a two-year contract with St. Pölten.
