= List of Estonian football transfers winter 2018–19 =

This is a list of Estonian football transfers in the winter transfer window 2018–19 by club. Only transfers related to Meistriliiga clubs are included.

This transfer window was open between the 2018 Meistriliiga and the 2019 Meistriliiga season. 1 club was changed: Maardu Linnameeskond joined Estonian top division after the relegation of Pärnu Vaprus.

== Meistriliiga ==
=== Nõmme Kalju ===
In:

No.	Pos.	Nation	Player
—	DF	(Estonia) EST	Aleksandr Ivanjušin (from Kohtla-Järve JK Järve)
—	DF	(Estonia) EST	Aleksandr Kulinitš (from (Slovenia) NK Krško)
—	FW	(Paraguay) PAR	Hector Nuñez (from (Paraguay) Club Presidente Hayes)
—	MF	(Estonia) EST	Sander Puri (from (Republic of Ireland) Waterford)
—	DF	(Estonia) EST	Mikk Reintam (from (Czech Republic) Třinec)
—	MF	(Estonia) EST	Roman Sobtšenko (from Tallinna Kalev)
—	MF	(Moldova) MDA	Eugen Zasavițchi (from (Moldova) Zimbru Chișinău)

Out:

No.	Pos.	Nation	Player
23	MF	(Croatia) CRO	Marko Brtan (end of contract)
22	DF	(Estonia) EST	Trevor Elhi (to (Bulgaria) POFC Botev Vratsa)
44	DF	(Brazil) BRA	William Gustavo (unknown)
33	FW	(Estonia) EST	Rimo Hunt (end of career)
2	DF	(Estonia) EST	Martin Mägi (end of career)

=== FCI Levadia ===
In:

No.	Pos.	Nation	Player
—	FW	(Ukraine) UKR	Yevhen Budnik (from (Greece) Lamia)
—	MF	(Estonia) EST	Pavel Dõmov (loan return from Paide Linnameeskond)
—	MF	(Estonia) EST	Marek Kaljumäe (from (Finland) PS Kemi)
—	FW	(Estonia) EST	Artjom Komlov (from TJK Legion)
—	GK	(Estonia) EST	Artur Kotenko (from Narva Trans)
—	MF	(Estonia) EST	Pavel Marin (loan return from (Finland) Kokkolan Palloveikot)
—	FW	(Brazil) BRA	Joao Morelli (from (Brazil) Ituano)
—	MF	(Estonia) EST	Alex Roosalu (loan return from Viljandi Tulevik)
—	DF	(Russia) RUS	Yevgeni Vladislavovich Osipov (from (Lithuania) Trakai)

Out:

No.	Pos.	Nation	Player
17	FW	(Ukraine) UKR	Roman Debelko (loan return to (Ukraine) Karpaty Lviv)
—	MF	(Estonia) EST	Pavel Dõmov (to Flora)
80	MF	(Germany) GER	Cem Felek (to (Finland) KuPS)
3	DF	(Estonia) EST	Roman Nesterovski (to Narva Trans)
—	MF	(Estonia) EST	Alex Roosalu (to Viljandi Tulevik)
28	MF	(Bosnia and Herzegovina) BIH	Muamer Svraka (to (Malta) Birkirkara)
19	MF	(Estonia) EST	Markus Vaherna (loan to Tallinna Kalev)

=== Flora Tallinn ===
In:

No.	Pos.	Nation	Player
—	GK	(Estonia) EST	Richard Aland (loan return from Pärnu Vaprus)
—	MF	(Estonia) EST	Pavel Dõmov (from FCI Levadia)
—	MF	(Estonia) EST	Henri Järvelaid (loan return from Tammeka)
—	DF	(Estonia) EST	Michael Lilander (from Paide Linnameeskond)
—	MF	(Estonia) EST	Marco Lukka (loan return from Tallinna Kalev)
—	GK	(Estonia) EST	Ingmar Krister Paplavskis (loan return from Kuressaare)
—	MF	(Estonia) EST	Herol Riiberg (loan return from Tulevik)
—	MF	(Estonia) EST	Konstantin Vassiljev (from (Poland) Piast Gliwice)

Out:

No.	Pos.	Nation	Player
4	DF	(Estonia) EST	Kevin Aloe (loan to Tammeka Tartu)
49	MF	(Georgia (country)) GEO	Zakaria Beglarishvili (loan to (Hungary) Budapest Honvéd)
22	MF	(Estonia) EST	Aleksandr Dmitrijev (end of career)
1	GK	(Estonia) EST	Magnus Karofeld (loan to Kuressaare)
71	FW	(Estonia) EST	Mark Anders Lepik (loan to (Switzerland) Winterthur)
3	DF	(Estonia) EST	Jürgen Lorenz (end of career)
27	MF	(Estonia) EST	Joseph Saliste (loan to Narva Trans)
73	GK	(Estonia) EST	Mait Toom (to Paide Linnameeskond)

=== Narva Trans ===
In:

No.	Pos.	Nation	Player
—	DF	(Lithuania) LTU	Markas Beneta (from (Lithuania) Kauno Žalgiris)
—	DF	(Senegal) SEN	Abdoulaye Diallo
—	MF	(Lithuania) LTU	Julius Kasparavičius (from (Lithuania) Sūduva)
—	GK	(Estonia) EST	Aleksei Matrossov (from (Tajikistan) FK Khujand)
—	FW	(United States) USA	Eric McWoods (free agent)
—	GK	(Estonia) EST	Marko Meerits (from (Finland) Vaasan Palloseura)
—	DF	(Estonia) EST	Roman Nesterovski (from FCI Levadia)
—	DF	(Estonia) EST	Joseph Saliste (on loan from Flora)

Out:

No.	Pos.	Nation	Player
10	FW	(Russia) RUS	Dmitri Barkov (to (Russia) Khimki)
27	MF	(Albania) ALB	Arber Basha (to (Ukraine) Olimpik Donetsk)
1	GK	(Kosovo) KOS	Betim Halimi (to (Ukraine) Olimpik Donetsk)
81	GK	(Estonia) EST	Artur Kotenko (to FCI Levadia)
63	DF	(Bermuda) BER	Dante Leverock (to (Republic of Ireland) Sligo Rovers)
5	DF	(Estonia) EST	Igor Ovsjannikov (four-year ban from football for drug use)

=== Paide Linnameeskond ===
In:

No.	Pos.	Nation	Player
—	DF	(Spain) ESP	Mikel Gurrutxaga (from (Finland) JS Hercules)
—	FW	(The Gambia) GAM	Alassana Jatta (from (The Gambia) Real de Banjul)
—	FW	(Estonia) EST	Andre Järva (from Tallinna Kalev)
—	FW	(Estonia) EST	Kevin Kauber (from (Finland) Ekenäs IF)
—	DF	(Estonia) EST	Karl Mööl (from Tallinna Kalev)
—	DF	(The Gambia) GAM	Muhammed Sanneh (from (The Gambia) Real de Banjul)
—	GK	(Estonia) EST	Mait Toom (from Flora)
—	MF	(Estonia) EST	Vladislav Zanfirov (from FCI Levadia U21)

Out:

No.	Pos.	Nation	Player
—	MF	(Estonia) EST	Kenert Anniste (loan to Tallinna Kalev)
29	FW	(Slovenia) SVN	Dejan Djermanovic (to (Oman) Al-Nasr SC)
13	MF	(Estonia) EST	Pavel Dõmov (loan return to FCI Levadia)
11	FW	(Estonia) EST	Henri Hanson (to Pärnu Vaprus)
27	DF	(Estonia) EST	Michael Lilander (to Flora)
69	GK	(Italy) ITA	Andrea Liotti
17	DF	(Estonia) EST	Märten Pajunurm (to Kuressaare)
42	GK	(Estonia) EST	Kaarel Rumberg (to Tabasalu JK)
20	DF	(Estonia) EST	Edgar Tur (loan to (Bulgaria) Botev Vratsa)

=== Tartu Tammeka ===
In:

No.	Pos.	Nation	Player
—	DF	(Estonia) EST	Kevin Aloe (from Flora)
—	MF	(Estonia) EST	Kristofer Kaasik (loan return from Pärnu Vaprus; to Tammeka U21)
—	MF	(Estonia) EST	Joonas Kartsep (from Santos Tartu)
—	DF	(Nigeria) NGA	Frankline Okoye (from (Finland) Kuopion Palloseura)
—	FW	(Estonia) EST	Albert Prosa (from (Finland) Turun Palloseura)

Out:

No.	Pos.	Nation	Player
5	DF	(Estonia) EST	Silver Grauberg (to (Finland) HIFK)
16	MF	(Estonia) EST	Henri Järvelaid (loan return to Flora)
19	FW	(Estonia) EST	Tristan Koskor (to (Iceland) Fylkir)
4	DF	(Estonia) EST	Markus Lokk (to Elva)

=== Viljandi Tulevik ===
In:

No.	Pos.	Nation	Player
—	MF	(Estonia) EST	Rasmus Alles
—	DF	(Estonia) EST	Mark Edur (from Levadia U21)
—	FW	(Estonia) EST	Kaimar Saag (from (Faroe Islands) B36 Tórshavn)
—	DF	(Estonia) EST	Siim Saar

Out:

No.	Pos.	Nation	Player
10	DF	(Estonia) EST	Gerdo Juhkam
14	MF	(Estonia) EST	Karel Kübar
7	FW	(Estonia) EST	Herol Riiberg (loan return to Flora)
11	MF	(Estonia) EST	Robert Taar
31	MF	(Estonia) EST	Roger Teor

=== Tallinna Kalev ===
In:

No.	Pos.	Nation	Player
—	MF	(Nigeria) NGA	Wale Musa Alli
—	MF	(Estonia) EST	Kenert Anniste (from Paide Linnameeskond)
—	DF	(Finland) FIN	Bangaly Kouyate (from (Finland) Bollklubben-46)
—	DF	(Bermuda) BER	Roger Lee (from (England) Loughborough Dynamo)
—	FW	(Estonia) EST	Artjom Ostrovski (on loan from FCI Levadia)
—	FW	(Estonia) EST	Karl Ander Sõerde (loan return from Pärnu Vaprus)
—	DF	(Estonia) EST	Kaspar Tilga (loan return from Pärnu Vaprus)
—	MF	(Estonia) EST	Markus Vaherna (on loan from FCI Levadia)

Out:

No.	Pos.	Nation	Player
18	DF	(Estonia) EST	Alger Džumadil (to Maardu Linnameeskond)
11	MF	(Estonia) EST	Ioan Yakovlev (to (Spain) Atlético Saguntino)
9	FW	(Estonia) EST	Andre Järva (to Paide Linnameeskond)
2	DF	(Cameroon) CMR	Steve Kingue (to (United States) Bethlehem Steel)
6	DF	(Estonia) EST	Marco Lukka (loan return to Flora)
34	MF	(Japan) JPN	Takuya Matsunaga (to (Faroe Islands) Klaksvíkar Ítróttarfelag)
33	DF	(Estonia) EST	Karl Mööl (to Paide Linnameeskond)
7	MF	(Estonia) EST	Roman Sobtšenko (loan return to Flora)
75	MF	(Japan) JPN	Hidetoshi Wakui (end of contract)

=== Kuressaare ===
In:

No.	Pos.	Nation	Player
—	GK	(Estonia) EST	Magnus Karofeld (from Flora)
—	MF	(Estonia) EST	Silver Alex Kelder (from Tallinna Kalev)
—	FW	(Estonia) EST	Otto-Robert Lipp (from Flora)
—	DF	(Estonia) EST	Kristen Mere (from Taritu)
—	DF	(Estonia) EST	Märten Pajunurm (from Paide Linnameeskond)
—	MF	(Estonia) EST	Rauno Tutk (from Pärnu Vaprus)

Out:

No.	Pos.	Nation	Player
1	GK	(Estonia) EST	Ingmar Krister Paplavskis (loan return to Flora)
20	MF	(Estonia) EST	Margus Rajaver (retired)

=== Maardu Linnameeskond ===
In:

No.	Pos.	Nation	Player
—	MF	(Japan) JPN	Kataro Amemiya (from (Latvia) Rēzeknes FA/BJSS)
—	DF	(Estonia) EST	Alger Džumadil (from Tallinna Kalev)
—	DF	(Estonia) EST	Erik Grigorjev (from Tallinna FC Cosmos)
—	MF	(Japan) JPN	Sho Hayasaka (from (Japan) Iwaki FC)
—	MF	(Estonia) EST	Alan Mones (from FCI Levadia U21)
—	DF	(Estonia) EST	Vladislav Tšurilkin (from Tallinna SK Augur Enemat)

Out:

No.	Pos.	Nation	Player
21	DF	(Estonia) EST	Tihhon Šišov (retired)

== See also ==
- 2019 Meistriliiga
