= 2016 Estonian Football Winter Tournament =

Tournament details
- Country: Estonia
- Dates: 8 January − 18 February 2016
- Teams: 18

Tournament statistics
- Matches played: 12
- Goals scored: 41 (3.42 per match)

The 2016 Estonian Football Winter Tournament or the 2016 EJL Jalgpallihalli Turniir is the third edition of the annual tournament in Estonia. This tournament is divided into three groups of 6 teams.

== Groups ==
=== Group A ===
| Team | Pld | W | D | L | GF | GA | GD | Pts |
|---|---|---|---|---|---|---|---|---|
| Flora | 5 | 4 | 1 | 0 | 21 | 1 | +20 | 13 |
| FC Infonet | 5 | 3 | 2 | 0 | 10 | 1 | +9 | 11 |
| Nõmme Kalju | 5 | 2 | 2 | 1 | 6 | 4 | +2 | 8 |
| JK Narva Trans | 5 | 1 | 1 | 3 | 4 | 13 | −9 | 4 |
| Sillamäe Kalev | 5 | 1 | 0 | 4 | 5 | 16 | −11 | 3 |
| Levadia Tallinn | 5 | 0 | 2 | 3 | 2 | 11 | −9 | 2 |

| 8 January 2016 | Levadia Tallinn | 0–3 | Sillamäe Kalev |
| 17:30 | | | Kabayev 37', 79'; Volkov 83' | Attendance: 75; Referee: Miko Pupart |

| 8 January 2016 | Nõmme Kalju | 1–1 | FC Infonet |
| 19:25 | Voskoboinikov 16' | | Elisius (yellow card) 15'; Mošnikov 75'; Dõmov (yellow card) 82' | Attendance: 89; Referee: Kristo Külljastinen |

| 9 January 2016 | Flora | 5–0 | JK Narva Trans |
| 14:00 | Laht 47', 55'; Alliku 62'; Tukiainen 68'; Riiberg 90' | | | Attendance: 50; Referee: Mart Martin |

| 15 January 2016 | Levadia Tallinn | 1–2 | FC Infonet |
| 17:30 | Hunt 19' | | Mošnikov (yellow card) 22'; Golovljov 53'; Harin (yellow card) 82' (goal) 87' | Referee: Roomer Tarajev |

| 15 January 2016 | Flora | 10–1 | Sillamäe Kalev |
| 20:10 | Tukiainen 2', 20', 36', 45'; Gussev 4'; Kams 5'; Frolov 13'; Shuvalov 16' (o.g.); Alliku 32'; Paavo (yellow card) 66'; Prosa 78' | | Kabayev 11' | Referee: Grigori Ošomkov |

| 16 January 2016 | Nõmme Kalju | 2–1 | JK Narva Trans |
| 14:00 | Quintieri 80', 89' | | Chernukhin (yellow card) 16'; Nesterovski 79' | Referee: Dmitri Kulikov |

| 22 January 2016 | Sillamäe Kalev | 0–1 | JK Narva Trans |
| 17:30 | | | Osvjannikov 24'; Nesterovski (yellow card) 58' | Referee: Kristo Tohver |

| 23 January 2016 | Nõmme Kalju | 0–0 | Levadia Tallinn |
| 14:00 | | | | Referee: Kristo Külljastinen |

| 26 January 2016 | Flora | 0–0 | FC Infonet |
| 19:15 | Jürgenson (yellow card) 36'; Anier (yellow card) 56' | | Harin (yellow card) 9'; Avilov (yellow card) 29'; Kruglov (yellow card) 57'; Appiah (yellow card) 59' | Attendance: 64; Referee: Juri Frischer |

| 29 January 2016 | Flora | 1–0 | Nõmme Kalju |
| 17:30 | Prosa 19'; Gussev (yellow card) 82' | | | Attendance: 100; Referee: Eiko Saar |

| 29 January 2016 | Levadia Tallinn | 1–1 | Narva Trans |
| 19:20 | Podholjuzin (yellow card) 33' (yellow-red card) 70'; Marin 36'; Pikk (yellow card) 48'; Koger (yellow card) 82' | | Lvov (yellow card) 49'; Nesterovski 70' (pen.); Plotnikov (yellow card) 73'; Ovsjannikov (yellow card) 79' | Attendance: 30; Referee: Andrei Karhu |

| 30 January 2016 | FC Infonet | 2–0 | Sillamäe Kalev |
| 14:00 | Mashichev 27'; Draman 48' (yellow card) 78'; Dmitrijev (yellow card) 57'; Kalimullin (yellow card) 59' | | Ivanjušin (yellow card) 9' | Referee: Roomer Tarajev |

| 5 February 2016 | Nõmme Kalju | 3–1 | Sillamäe Kalev |
| 17:00 | Kirss 10', 13'; Jorge Rodrigues 72' | | Paponov (yellow card) 40'; Volkov 60' | Referee: Eiko Saar |

| 5 February 2016 | FC Infonet | 5–1 | JK Narva Trans |
| 19:15 | Dmitrijev 20' (yellow card) 28'; Strukov 27'; Mošnikov 34'; Jevdokimov 49'; Appia Afossu (yellow card) 75'; Harin (yellow card) 83' (goal) 88' | | Barkov 10'; Ovsjannikov (yellow card) 31'; Jakovlev (yellow card) 77' | Referee: Martin Salong |

| 6 February 2016 | Flora | 5–0 | Levadia Tallinn |
| 14:00 | Laht 7'; Ainsalu 10'; Vihmann (yellow card) 36'; Saliste 53'; Jürgenson 60' (pen.); Baranov (yellow card) 64'; Frolov 90' | | Dzumadil (yellow card) 79'; Koger (yellow card) 88' | Attendance: 63; Referee: Kristo Tohver |

=== Group B ===
| Team | Pld | W | D | L | GF | GA | GD | Pts |
|---|---|---|---|---|---|---|---|---|
| Paide Linnameeskond | 5 | 4 | 0 | 1 | 14 | 6 | +8 | 12 |
| Pärnu Linnameeskond | 5 | 3 | 1 | 1 | 9 | 8 | +1 | 10 |
| Viljandi JK Tulevik | 5 | 2 | 1 | 2 | 10 | 8 | +2 | 7 |
| Rakvere JK Tarvas | 5 | 2 | 1 | 2 | 7 | 8 | −1 | 7 |
| JK Tallinna Kalev | 5 | 1 | 1 | 3 | 5 | 9 | −4 | 4 |
| Tartu JK Tammeka | 5 | 0 | 2 | 3 | 2 | 8 | −6 | 2 |

| 9 January 2016 | Viljandi JK Tulevik | 0–1 | Rakvere JK Tarvas |
| 15:45 | | | Saar 63' | Attendance: 10; Referee: Kristo Tohver |

| 9 January 2016 | Pärnu Linnameeskond | 2–1 | JK Tallinna Kalev |
| 17:30 | Laurits 49', 71' | | Hausenberg (yellow card) 59'; Lilleorg 83' | Referee: Juri Frischer |

| 9 January 2016 | Tartu JK Tammeka | 0–3 | Paide Linnameeskond |
| 19:15 | | | Zahovaiko 23', 46'; Uwaegbulam 62'; Kelder (yellow card) 74' | Attendance: 18; Referee: Dmitri Kirilov |

| 16 January 2016 | Viljandi JK Tulevik | 3–1 | Paide Linnameeskond |
| 15:45 | Toomet 24' (o.g.); Teor 63'; Saag 86' | | Lang (yellow card) 28'; Normann 72' (o.g.) | Referee: Marko Liiva |

| 16 January 2016 | Pärnu Linnameeskond | 2–0 | Rakvere JK Tarvas |
| 17:30 | Leokin 5'; Saarts 68' | | | Attendance: 48; Referee: Tomi Rahula |

| 16 January 2016 | Tartu JK Tammeka | 0–1 | JK Tallinna Kalev |
| 19:30 | Kütt (yellow card) 4'; Laabus (yellow card) 19'; Tauts (yellow card) 35' | | Karpov 20'; Heinala (yellow card) 59' | Attendance: 25; Referee: Andrei Karhu |

| 23 January 2016 | Viljandi JK Tulevik | 3–1 | Tartu JK Tammeka |
| 15:45 | Kähr 38' (yellow card) 59'; Ilves 61', 71' | | Rääbis 18' | Attendance: 32; Referee: Joonas Jaanovits |

| 23 January 2016 | Pärnu Linnameeskond | 1–4 | Paide Linnameeskond |
| 17:30 | Vihmoja 30'; Mardiste (yellow card) 53' | | Uwaegbulam 7', 54' (pen.) (yellow card) 7'; Kaše 66', 81' | Referee: Siim Rinken |

| 23 January 2016 | Rakvere JK Tarvas | 4–1 | JK Tallinna Kalev |
| 19:15 | Ljaš 40'; Kubber 42'; Saar 58'; Mõttus (yellow card) 68'; Reimal 86' | | Kelder 74' | Attendance: 34; Referee: Martin Salong |

| 30 January 2016 | Viljandi JK Tulevik | 1–1 | JK Tallinna Kalev |
| 15:45 | Saag 84' (yellow card) 88' | | Paal 37' | Attendance: 30; Referee: Roman Treial |

| 30 January 2016 | Pärnu Linnameeskond | 0–0 | Tartu JK Tammeka |
| 17:30 | Laurits (yellow card) 24' | | Anderson (yellow card) 39'; Tekko (yellow card) 75' (yellow-red card) 88' | Attendance: 30; Referee: Mart Martin |

| 30 January 2016 | Paide Linnameeskond | 4–1 | Rakvere JK Tarvas |
| 19:15 | Varendi 2', 90'; Uwaegbulam 68', 79' | | Saar 22' (red card) 63'; Sobtšenko (yellow card) 75' | Attendance: 67; Referee: Kristo Tohver |

| 6 February 2016 | Tartu JK Tammeka | 1–1 | Rakvere JK Tarvas |
| 15:45 | Rääbis 10'; Gull (yellow card) 39' | | Larin (yellow card) 9' (goal) 82' | Attendance: 16; Referee: Kristo Külljastinen |

| 6 February 2016 | Pärnu Linnameeskond | 4–3 | Viljandi JK Tulevik |
| 17:30 | Leokin (yellow card) 20' (goal) 82'; Melts (yellow card) 39'; Laurits 50', 90'; Lenk 52' | | Henn 37'; Allik (yellow card) 44'; Loigo (yellow card) 55'; Ilves 60', 66' (pen.); Post (yellow card) 90' | Attendance: 20; Referee: Mart Martin |

| 6 February 2016 | Paide Linnameeskond | 2–1 | JK Tallinna Kalev |
| 19:15 | Hansberg 64'; Kase 79'; Lilander (yellow card) 82' | | Kõiv 83' (pen.) | Attendance: 33; Referee: Tomi Rahula |

=== Group C ===
| Team | Pld | W | D | L | GF | GA | GD | Pts |
|---|---|---|---|---|---|---|---|---|
| FC Flora U21 | 4 | 3 | 0 | 1 | 16 | 7 | +9 | 9 |
| Nõmme Kalju FC U21 | 4 | 3 | 0 | 1 | 14 | 7 | +7 | 9 |
| FC Santos Tartu | 4 | 2 | 0 | 2 | 8 | 5 | +3 | 6 |
| FC Levadia II Tallinn | 4 | 2 | 0 | 2 | 11 | 12 | −1 | 6 |
| FC Infonet II Tallinn | 4 | 2 | 0 | 2 | 8 | 13 | −5 | 6 |
| FC Kuressaare | 4 | 0 | 0 | 4 | 4 | 17 | −13 | 0 |

| 24 January 2016 | FC Infonet II Tallinn | 1–3 | Nõmme Kalju FC U21 |
| 09:45 | Golovljov 88' | | Pihelgas 12'; Klein 60'; Ilves 83' | Attendance: 32; Referee: Tomi Rahula |

| 24 January 2016 | FC Flora U21 | 2–1 | FC Kuressaare |
| 15:00 | Rande 11'; Sorga 56' | | Alt 19'; Suursaar (yellow card) 67' | Attendance: 33; Referee: Reelika Turi |

| 24 January 2016 | FC Levadia II Tallinn | 1–3 | FC Santos Tartu |
| 16:45 | Vaherna (yellow card) 25'; Kuusma 80' | | Vidaja 20'; Roops 39'; Vellemaa 82' | Referee: Dmitri Kirilov |

| 31 January 2016 | FC Flora U21 | 2–3 | FC Levadia II Tallinn |
| 09:45 | Paur 14'; Kreida (red card) 44'; Ridamäe (yellow card) 50' (goal) 64' | | Niilop (yellow card) 32'; Vaherna 42'; Kuusma 70' (yellow card) 79'; Väli 81' | Attendance: 25; Referee: Dmitri Kirilov |

| 31 January 2016 | FC Kuressaare | 1–6 | Nõmme Kalju FC U21 |
| 15:00 | Paju 90' | | Klein 12', 68'; Mägi 36'; Helaia 45'; Ilves 64', ?', 75' | Referee: Reelika Turi |

| 31 January 2016 | FC Santos Tartu | 0–2 | FC Infonet II Tallinn |
| 16:45 | Ojaste (yellow card) 9'; Kallandi (yellow card) 84'; Aus (yellow card) 90' | | Badjuk 21', 66'; Tsvertko (yellow card) 37'; Bulavkin (yellow card) 39' | Attendance: 22; Referee: Jagnar Jakobson |

| 4 February 2016 | FC Infonet II Tallinn | 0–7 | FC Flora U21 |
| 19:00 | Danilin (yellow card) 29' | | Heinmaa (yellow card) 9'; Tukiainen 17', 27' (pen.), 30' (pen.), 50', 85'; Paur 32'; Sorga 82' | Attendance: 34; Referee: Joonas Jaanovits |

| 7 February 2016 | FC Levadia II Tallinn | 4–2 | FC Kuressaare |
| 15:00 | Dzumadil 31'; Väli 75'; Niilop 79'; Lepik 81' | | Stern 20'; Viira 45' | Referee: Marko Liiva |

| 7 February 2016 | Nõmme Kalju FC U21 | 2–0 | FC Santos Tartu |
| 16:45 | Klein 50'; Kummer 77' | | | Referee: Toomas Nõmmiste |

| 13 February 2016 | FC Flora U21 | 5–3 | Nõmme Kalju FC U21 |
| 20:15 | Tukiainen 10', 30'; Laht (yellow card) 60'; Fedorenko 75'; Tammerik 83'; Pihelgas 86' (o.g.); Lepistu (yellow card) 89' | | Kaldma 7'; Klein 62', 64' | Referee: Martin Salong |

| 14 February 2016 | FC Kuressaare | 0–5 | FC Santos Tartu |
| 15:00 | | | Meinhard 17' (pen.); Vellemaa 62', 77'; Vidaja 68'; Roops 80' | Attendance: 15; Referee: Siim Rinken |

| 14 February 2016 | FC Levadia II Tallinn | 3–5 | FC Infonet II Tallinn |
| 18:30 | Preiman 6'; Kuusma 38'; Koger 62' | | Golovljov 44', 76', 83'; Dõmov 45'; Badjuk 66' | Attendance: 45; Referee: Dmitri Kirilov |

=== Group D ===
| 23 January 2016 | Kohtla-Järve JK Järve | 3–0 | JK Tallinna Kalev II |
| 12:00 | Medvedev 9'; Tipukin 23' (yellow card) 43'; Lebedev 36'; Ozerov 74'; Tihhonov 75' | | Lenk (yellow card) 8' | Attendance: 11; Referee: Elar Tarkus |

| 24 January 2016 | JK Vändra Vaprus | 4–1 | Raasiku FC Joker |
| 11:30 | Aavik (yellow card) 16'; Lepik 18', 28'; Saaremets 36'; Jürissaar 41'; Ilves 79' | | Lill 40' | Attendance: 16; Referee: Revo Sirel |

| 24 January 2016 | Maardu FC Starbunker | 7–1 | FC Elva |
| 13:20 | Šalabai 7', 51'; Gussev 11'; Gurtšioglujants (red card) 30'; Kovtun (yellow card) 34'; Zelentsov 35', 63' (yellow card) 61'; Abdullajev 81' (yellow card) 90'; Lebedev 89' | | Kütt (yellow card) 34'; Timm 53' | Attendance: 17; Referee: Karl Koppel |

| 30 January 2016 | JK Vändra Vaprus | 0–5 | Maardu FC Starbunker |
| 12:00 | Milistver (yellow card) 76' | | Zelentsov 18', 89'; Malov 54'; Brõlin 74'; Boldõrev 77' | Attendance: 10; Referee: Tomi Rahula |

| 31 January 2016 | FC Elva | 0–1 | Kohtla-Järve JK Järve |
| 11:30 | Timm (yellow card) 23'; Kütt (yellow card) 52'; Avasoo (yellow card) 57'; Samoilov (yellow card) 66' | | Ozerov 19'; Smolin (yellow card) 66' | Attendance: 17; Referee: Denis Petrov |

| 31 January 2016 | Raasiku FC Joker | – | JK Tallinna Kalev II |
| 18:30 | | | | Referee: Ainar Kuusk |

| 6 February 2016 | Maardu FC Starbunker | 4–0 | Raasiku FC Joker |
| 12:00 | Dzestelov 16' (o.g.); Russak (red card) 40'; Brõlin 48'; Aristov (yellow card) 70'; Abdullajev 78'; Iljin 89' | | Randjõe (yellow card) 13'; Teino (yellow card) 84' | Attendance: 13; Referee: Revo Sirel |

| 7 February 2016 | JK Tallinna Kalev II | 0–4 | FC Elva |
| 11:30 | Aruste (yellow card) 36' | | Kütt (yellow card) 6' (goal) 37'; Maidla 15'; Avasoo 66'; Frei 78' | Attendance: 20; Referee: Urmo Visnapuu |

| 7 February 2016 | Kohtla-Järve JK Järve | 0–0 | JK Vändra Vaprus |
| 13:15 | Tihhonov (yellow card) 87'; Kulikov (red card) 89' | | Vesselov (yellow card) 50' | Attendance: 25; Referee: Denis Petrov |

| 13 February 2016 | Raasiku FC Joker | 2–0 | FC Elva |
| 16:45 | Lill (red card) 39'; Pruuli 53'; Randjõe 57'; Teino (yellow card) 63' | | Kütt (yellow card) 39'; Toom (yellow card) 90' | Attendance: 11; Referee: Joonas Jaanovits |

| 13 February 2016 | Maardu FC Starbunker | 5–1 | Kohtla-Järve JK Järve |
| 18:30 | Narnitski 23' (o.g.); Aasmäe 56'; Iljin 63'; Boldõrev 73'; Brõlin 87' | | Semjonov 74' | Attendance: 34; Referee: Jagnar Jakobson |

| 14 February 2016 | Pärnu Linnameeskond | 2–0 | JK Tallinna Kalev II |
| 18:30 | Laasma 69'; Ilves 73' | | | Referee: Toomas Nõmmiste |

=== Group E ===
| 22 January 2016 | FC Flora U19 | 0–3 | JK Tammeka U21 |
| 19:15 | Urva (yellow card) 32' | | Pärli 51', 75'; Reinkort 90' | Attendance: 9 Referee: Andrei Brõtkin |

| 24 January 2016 | FC Nõmme United | 1–1 | Tartu JK Welco |
| 18:30 | Mätas 75' (pen.) | | Lõbu 19'; Valtna (yellow card) 61' (yellow card) 74' (yellow-red card); Pilvet (red card) 87' | Attendance: 30; Referee: Urmo Visnapuu |

| 24 January 2016 | Viimsi JK | 5–1 | Viljandi JK Tulevik II |
| 20:15 | Sillaste 55' (pen.); Kansi 67' (o.g.); Õunapuu 73'; Kaljumäe 78'; Reinvald 83' | | Luhakooder 9' | Attendance: 6 Referee: Kirill Andreev |

| 28 January 2016 | FC Flora U19 | 0–4 | Viimsi JK |
| 19:00 | | | Kaljumäe 21'; Lember (yellow card) 32'; Luhaorg (yellow card) 45' (yellow-red card) 87'; Pärna 55'; Nõmme 77'; Tammeveski 79' | Referee: Andrei Brõtkin |

| 31 January 2016 | JK Tammeka U21 | 4–2 | Tartu JK Welco |
| 14:00 | Pärli 21'; Tiik (yellow card) 25'; Karu 53'; Kaasik 59'; Taan (yellow card) 69'; Mõttus 83' | | Kaasik 16', 44'; Kiiho (yellow card) 80'; Tiru (yellow card) 81' | Attendance: 25; Referee: Marko Liiva |

| 31 January 2016 | Viljandi JK Tulevik II | 1–2 | FC Nõmme United |
| 13:15 | Lukka (yellow card) 33'; Paavo 78'; Lukka (yellow card) 83' | | Eino 39'; Žarikov 40'; Piiber (yellow card) 80'; Nurme (red card) 86' | Attendance: 30; Referee: Aleksei Smirnov |

| 7 February 2016 | FC Nõmme United | 6–0 | FC Flora U19 |
| 09:45 | Eino 27', 83', 86'; Mätas 65'; Maidla 80' (o.g.); Koppel 88' (pen.); Juha (yellow card) 90' | | Haak (yellow card) 87' | Attendance: 47; Referee: Karl Koppel |

| 7 February 2016 | Viljandi JK Tulevik II | 2–3 | Tartu JK Welco |
| 18:30 | Luhakooder 32', 79' (yellow card) 50' | | Kaasik 30'; Sillaots 53'; Lubi (yellow card) 58'; Stern 73' | Referee: Andrei Brõtkin |

| 7 February 2016 | Viimsi JK | 1–4 | JK Tammeka U21 |
| 20:15 | Klemmer (yellow card) 15'; Astur 51' (yellow card) 69' | | Aasmäe 5'; Nuuma 36'; Pärli 47'; Kolk (yellow card) 58'; Taan (yellow card) 70'; Kaasik 73' | Attendance: 10; Referee: Paul Kask |

| 13 February 2016 | JK Tammeka U21 | 9–1 | Viljandi JK Tulevik II |
| 15:00 | Koskor 22', 52', 80'; Paju 28'; Jõgi 55', 67'; Tauts 56'; Miller 75'; Suurpere 90' | | Kübar 34'; Urbel (yellow card) 54' | Attendance: 9 Referee: Tomi Rahula |

| 14 February 2016 | FC Flora U19 | 2–3 | Tartu JK Welco |
| 13:15 | Rande 5'; Fedorenko 11' | | Valtna 40'; Vare 78'; Reinberg 86' | Referee: Dmitri Kulikov |

| 14 February 2016 | Viimsi JK | 0–3 | FC Nõmme United |
| 16:45 | | | Mätas 21'; Žarikov 25'; Koppel 78' | Attendance: 14; Referee: Revo Sirel |

=== Group G ===
| 18 February 2016 | Saue JK Laagri | 4–1 | JK Dünamo Tallinn |
| 19:00 | Zolotuhhin 32' (o.g.); Suurjärv 53', 61', 83' | | Timatayo 33' | Attendance: 22; Referee: Karl Koppel |
