= Estonian Football Winter Tournament =

Football competition in Estonia

- Region: Estonia
- Teams: 12

Estonian Football Winter Tournament (EJL Taliturniir) is a pre-season tournament for clubs from Estonia.

The tournament is meant as a preseason training. By the current rules, no winner is declared and a tournament table is not kept.

== Tournaments by year ==
Year:	Team:	Place:	Silver:	Place	Bronze:	Place
2014 Estonian Football Winter Tournament	FC Levadia Tallinn	1		2		3
2015 Estonian Football Winter Tournament	FC Flora	1	FC Infonet	2	JK Sillamäe Kalev	3
2016 Estonian Football Winter Tournament	FC Flora	1	FC Infonet	2	Nõmme Kalju FC	3
2017 Estonian Football Winter Tournament						
2018 Estonian Football Winter Tournament						
2019 Estonian Football Winter Tournament						
2020 Estonian Football Winter Tournament						
2021 Estonian Football Winter Tournament						
2022 Estonian Football Winter Tournament						
