= List of Estonian football transfers summer 2020 =

This is a list of Estonian football transfers in the summer transfer window 2020 by club.

This transfer window was open during the 2020 Meistriliiga season.

== Meistriliiga ==
=== Flora Tallinn ===
In:

| No. | Pos. | Nation | Player |
|---|---|---|---|
| 25 | DF | (Estonia) EST | Ken Kallaste (from (Poland) Tychy) |
| 32 | GK | (Estonia) EST | Matvei Igonen (from (Norway) Lillestrom) |
| 43 | DF | (Estonia) EST | Markkus Seppik (loan return from (Germany) Holstein Kiel youth team) |
| 70 | FW | (Estonia) EST | Mattias Männilaan (loan return from (Germany) Holstein Kiel youth team) → |
| — | DF | (Estonia) EST | Marco Lukka (loan from Kuressaare) |
| — | DF | (Estonia) EST | Leonid Arhipov (loan from Tallinna Legion) |

Out:

| No. | Pos. | Nation | Player |
|---|---|---|---|
| 8 | MF | (Estonia) EST | Mihkel Ainsalu (to (Ukraine) FC Lviv) |
| 22 | MF | (Estonia) EST | Pavel Dõmov (on loan to Tallinna Kalev) |
| 33 | GK | (Estonia) EST | Richard Aland (contract was terminated and joined Levadia) |
| 70 | FW | (Estonia) EST | Mattias Männilaan (on loan to Kuressaare) |

=== FCI Levadia ===
In:

| No. | Pos. | Nation | Player |
|---|---|---|---|
| 12 | GK | (Estonia) EST | Richard Aland (free agent) |
| 52 | MF | (Ukraine) UKR | Ihor Zhurakhovskyi (free agent) |

Out:

| No. | Pos. | Nation | Player |
|---|---|---|---|
| 4 | DF | (Ukraine) UKR | Oleksandr Safronov (loan terminated and returned to (Ukraine) Dnipro-1) |
| 5 | MF | (Ukraine) UKR | Yuriy Tkachuk (contract terminated) |
| 12 | GK | (Estonia) EST | Sergei Lepmets (contract terminated) |

=== Nõmme Kalju ===
In:

| No. | Pos. | Nation | Player |
|---|---|---|---|
| 24 | FW | (Estonia) EST | Alex Matthias Tamm (loan return from (Switzerland) Grasshopper) |

Out:

| No. | Pos. | Nation | Player |

=== Paide Linnameeskond ===
In:

| No. | Pos. | Nation | Player |
|---|---|---|---|
| 8 | FW | (Estonia) EST | Henri Anier (from (Netherlands) Go Ahead Eagles) |
| 12 | DF | (Ghana) GHA | Abdul Yusif (on loan from (Ghana) Densu Rovers) |
| 31 | FW | (Netherlands) NED | Deabeas Owusu-Sekyere |

Out:

| No. | Pos. | Nation | Player |
|---|---|---|---|
| 9 | FW | (Estonia) EST | Kristofer Piht (loan to (Italy) S.P.A.L.) |

=== Tartu Tammeka ===
In:

| No. | Pos. | Nation | Player |

Out:

| No. | Pos. | Nation | Player |

=== Narva Trans ===
In:

| No. | Pos. | Nation | Player |

Out:

| No. | Pos. | Nation | Player |

=== Viljandi Tulevik ===
In:

| No. | Pos. | Nation | Player |
|---|---|---|---|
| — | FW | (Estonia) EST | Rainer Peips (from Vändra Vaprus) |

Out:

| No. | Pos. | Nation | Player |
|---|---|---|---|
| 55 | MF | (Senegal) SEN | Galaye Gueye (contract terminated) |

=== Tallinna Kalev ===
In:

| No. | Pos. | Nation | Player |
|---|---|---|---|
| 35 | MF | (Estonia) EST | Murad Velijev (from (Germany) 1860 Rosenheim youth team) |
| — | MF | (Estonia) EST | Pavel Dõmov (on loan from Flora) |
| — | DF | (Estonia) EST | Ralf-Sander Suvinõmm (on loan from Flora U21) |

Out:

| No. | Pos. | Nation | Player |
|---|---|---|---|
| 6 | DF | (Estonia) EST | Sören Kaldma (to Kuressaare) |
| 20 | FW | (Morocco) MAR | Selim El Aabchi (retired from professional football) |
| 90 | MF | (Estonia) EST | Tristan Toomas Teeväli (to Flora U21) |

=== Kuressaare ===
In:

| No. | Pos. | Nation | Player |
|---|---|---|---|
| 27 | FW | (Estonia) EST | Mattias Männilaan (on loan from Flora) |
| 3 | DF | (Estonia) EST | Sören Kaldma (from Tallinna Kalev) |

Out:

| No. | Pos. | Nation | Player |
|---|---|---|---|
| 21 | DF | (Estonia) EST | Marco Lukka (loan to Flora) |

=== Tallinna Legion ===
In:

| No. | Pos. | Nation | Player |
|---|---|---|---|
| 11 | FW | (Russia) RUS | Nikita Andreev (from (Spain) Intercity) |
| 14 | MF | (Estonia) EST | Aleksandr Dmitrijev (came out of retirement) |
| 23 | FW | (Estonia) EST | Albert Prosa (free agent) |

Out:

| No. | Pos. | Nation | Player |
|---|---|---|---|
| — | DF | (Estonia) EST | Leonid Arhipov (loan to Flora) |
| 13 | MF | (Estonia) EST | Maksim Lipin (contract terminated) |
