= 2017 Estonian Football Winter Tournament =

Tournament details
- Country: Estonia
- Dates: 6 January − 4 February 2017 (Group A,B)
- Teams: 30

Tournament statistics
- Matches played: 12
- Goals scored: 36 (3 per match)

The 2017 Estonian Football Winter Tournament or the 2017 EJL Jalgpallihalli Turniir is the fourth edition of the annual tournament in Estonia. This tournament is divided into five groups of 6 teams.

== Groups ==
=== Group A ===
Team	Pld	W	D	L	GF	GA	GD	Pts
Nõmme Kalju FC	4	2	2	0	5	3	+2	8
FCI Tallinn	4	2	1	1	8	4	+4	7
Flora	4	2	0	2	5	7	−2	6
Sillamäe Kalev	4	1	2	1	5	3	+2	5
FC Levadia Tallinn	4	0	4	0	2	2	0	4
Paide Linnameeskond	4	0	1	3	3	9	−6	1

6 January 2017
17:30

Flora	0–1	Nõmme Kalju FC
Tamm (yellow card) 19'; Vihmann (yellow card) 27'	Report	Mašitšev (yellow card) 6'; Kuusk (yellow card) 27'; Kirss 59'; Valikayev (yellow card) 70'

Lilleküla Stadium
Referee: Kristo Tohver
7 January 2017
14:00

FC Levadia Tallinn	0–0	FCI Tallinn
	Report	Kruglov (yellow card) 35'

Lilleküla Stadium
Attendance: 74
Referee: Eiko Saar
7 January 2017
14:00

JK Sillamäe Kalev	3–0	Paide Linnameeskond
Slaštšev 2'; Gurtckaia 17'; Torinava (yellow card) 65'; Grigorevski 83'	Report

Lilleküla Stadium
Attendance: 27
Referee: Juri Frischer

13 January 2017
17:30

FCI Tallinn	4–1	Flora
Voskoboinikov 15'; Tumasjan (yellow card) 26' (goal) 57'; Lukka 39' (o.g.); Ogorodnik 88'	Report	Lukka (yellow card) 54'; Alliku 62'

Lilleküla Stadium
Attendance: 67
Referee: Juri Frischer
13 January 2017
19:15

Nõmme Kalju FC	1–1	Sillamäe Kalev
Starodubtsev 13' (o.g.); Slaštšov (yellow card) 26'; Sukhanov (yellow card) 29'	Report	Volkov 52'; Perreira (yellow card) 68'

Lilleküla Stadium
Attendance: 46
Referee: Kristo Külljastinen
14 January 2017
14:00

Paide Linnameeskond	1–1	FC Levadia Tallinn
Juha 44'	Report	Marin (yellow card) 54'; Artjunin 85'

Lilleküla Stadium
Attendance: 45
Referee: Tomi Rahula

17 January 2017
19:15

FC Levadia Tallinn	1–1	Nõmme Kalju FC
Morelli 77'	Report	Dmitrijev 16' (yellow card) 52'; Santos (yellow card) 51'; Mööl (yellow card) 58'

Lilleküla Stadium
Referee: Mart Martin
18 January 2017
20:30

Flora	2–1	Sillamäe Kalev
Lepistu (yellow card) 17'; Sappinen 37'; Järvelaid 79'	Report	Aidara 84'

Lilleküla Stadium
Attendance: 60
Referee: Tomi Rahula
21 January 2017
14:00

FCI Tallinn	3–1	Paide Linnameeskond
Nesterov 12', 26'; Tumasjan (yellow card) 14'; Kulinitš 50'	Report	Järva 16'; Sinilaid (yellow card) 88'

Lilleküla Stadium
Attendance: 52
Referee: Joonas Jaanovits

27 January 2017
17:30

FCI Tallinn	1–2	Nõmme Kalju FC
Harin (yellow card) 57' (goal) 59'; Voskoboinikov (yellow card) 73'; Maksimenko (yellow card) 77'	Report	Perreira 42' (yellow card) 47'; Dmitrijev (yellow card) 57'; Maksimenko 59' (o.g.); Kirss (yellow card) 89'

Lilleküla Stadium
Referee: Kristo Tohver
28 January 2017
15:45

Paide Linnameeskond	1–2	Flora
Vainumäe 57'	Report	Beglarishvili 56' (pen.); Fedorenko 82'

Lilleküla Stadium
Attendance: 37
Referee: Siim Rinken
28 January 2017
14:00

JK Sillamäe Kalev	0–0	FC Levadia Tallinn
	Report

Lilleküla Stadium
Attendance: 25
Referee: Joonas Jaanovits

=== Group B ===
Team	Pld	W	D	L	GF	GA	GD	Pts
Viljandi JK Tulevik	5	2	3	0	11	6	+5	9
Tartu JK Tammeka	5	2	3	0	6	1	+5	9
Maardu Linnameeskond	5	2	1	2	16	9	+7	7
Pärnu Linnameeskond	5	2	1	2	7	8	−1	7
Rakvere JK Tarvas	5	1	1	3	7	14	−7	4
JK Narva Trans	5	0	3	2	4	13	−9	3

6 January 2017
19:15

Pärnu Linnameeskond	0–2	Tartu JK Tammeka
	Report	Jõgi (yellow card) 35'; Kapper 45'; Tauts 80'; Tiik (yellow card) 83'

Lilleküla Stadium
Attendance: 17
Referee: Grigori Ošomkov
7 January 2017
12:15

Maardu Linnameeskond	1–3	Rakvere JK Tarvas
Boldõrev (yellow card) 3'; Krivošein 61'; Denis Kovtun (red card) 83'	Report	Ljaš 3' (pen.), 67'; Larin (yellow card) 42' (yellow card) 83' (yellow-red card); Akimov 78'; Gull (yellow card) 90'

Lilleküla Stadium
Attendance: 20
Referee: Miko Pupart
7 January 2017
17:30

Viljandi JK Tulevik	2–2	JK Narva Trans
Ahjupera 38'; Peips 43'	Report	Kondraitsev (yellow card) 18'; Elysée (yellow card) 34'; Škinjov 45'; Jakovlev 84'

Lilleküla Stadium
Referee: Mart Martin

14 January 2017
12:15

Viljandi JK Tulevik	1–1	Pärnu Linnameeskond
Ahjupera 71'	Report	Ilves 2'

Lilleküla Stadium
Referee: Toomas Nõmmiste
14 January 2017
15:45

JK Narva Trans	0–8	Maardu Linnameeskond
Kondratssev (yellow card) 22'; Plotnikov (yellow card) 34'; Aksanov (red card) 38'; Ovsjannikov (yellow card) 39'	Report	Titenok 4'; Aasmäe 23', 80'; Gussev 39' (pen.); Aristov 63'; Zelentsov 73', 78'; Boldõrev 85'

Lilleküla Stadium
Attendance: 24
Referee: Marko Liiva
14 January 2017
17:30

Tartu JK Tammeka	3–0	Rakvere JK Tarvas
Mõttus 16'; Jõgi 31'; Kiidron (yellow card) 36'; Anderson (yellow card) 36'; Järviste 86'	Report	Larin (yellow card) 57'

Lilleküla Stadium
Attendance: 15
Referee: Denis Petrov

20 January 2017
17:30

Tartu JK Tammeka	0–0	JK Narva Trans
Tekko (yellow card) 20' (yellow card) 35' (yellow-red card); Kapper (yellow card) 26'	Report	Tšerezov (yellow card) 32'; Kondratsev (yellow card) 73'

Lilleküla Stadium
Attendance: 21
Referee: Kristo Külljastinen
20 January 2017
19:15

Maardu Linnameeskond	2–3	Viljandi JK Tulevik
Kotov 61'; Zelentsov 63'; Aristov (yellow card) 74' (yellow card) 75' (yellow-red card); Kovtun (yellow card) 78'	Report	Allik 30'; Ilves 67', 68'

Lilleküla Stadium
Attendance: 31
Referee: Dmitri Kirilov
21 January 2017
15:45

Pärnu JK Vaprus	3–1	Rakvere JK Tarvas
Villota 6'; Peetson (yellow card) 12'; Saarts 16', 28'	Report	Kaasik 61'

Lilleküla Stadium
Attendance: 17
Referee: Siim Rinken

27 January 2017
19:15

Rakvere JK Tarvas	2–2	JK Narva Trans
Kuokkanen (yellow card) 25'; Tovstik (yellow card) 39'; Akimov 80'; Ljas 90'	Report	Škinjov (yellow card) 29' (yellow card) 37' (yellow-red card); Ovsjannikov (yellow card) 30'; Lvov 51'; Tunjov (yellow card) 60'; Jurõšev 64'; Kondrattsev (yellow card) 82'

Lilleküla Stadium
Attendance: 30
Referee: Andrei Karhu

=== Group C ===
Team	Pld	W	D	L	GF	GA	GD	Pts
JK Tallinna Kalev	5	4	1	0	10	1	+9	13
FC Levadia U21	5	3	1	1	12	8	+4	10
FC Flora U21	5	3	1	1	13	6	+7	10
Nõmme Kalju FC U21	5	1	1	3	9	17	−8	4
FCI Tallinn U21	5	1	0	4	8	11	−3	3
FC Elva	5	0	2	3	5	14	−9	2

=== Group D ===
Team	Pld	W	D	L	GF	GA	GD	Pts
FC Kuressaare	5	3	2	0	14	10	+4	11
Tartu JK Welco	5	3	0	2	9	9	0	9
JK Tammeka II Tartu	5	2	2	1	7	9	−2	8
Kohtla-Järve JK Järve	5	2	1	2	7	6	+1	7
JK Vändra Vaprus	5	2	0	3	12	11	+1	6
JK Tallinna Kalev II	5	0	1	4	7	11	−4	1

=== Group E ===
Team	Pld	W	D	L	GF	GA	GD	Pts
FC Nõmme United	5	5	0	0	17	4	+13	15
Viimsi JK	5	4	0	1	15	3	+12	12
Keila JK	5	2	0	3	14	14	0	6
Paide Linnameeskond II	5	2	0	3	8	11	−3	6
FC Flora U19	5	2	0	3	8	12	−4	6
Raasiku FC Joker	5	0	0	5	5	23	−18	0

27 January 2017
21:00

FC Flora U19	0–1	Paide Linnameeskond II
Ait (yellow card) 78'	Report	Bachmann 57'

Lilleküla Stadium
Attendance: 31
Referee: Denis Petrov

=== Group F ===
Team	Pld	W	D	L	GF	GA	GD	Pts
Pärnu JK	5	4	0	1	24	10	+14	12
Lasnamäe FC Ajax	5	3	1	1	10	9	+1	10
Tabasalu JK	5	2	2	1	17	9	+8	8
Saue JK Laagri	5	2	2	1	11	7	+4	8
Kohtla-Järve JK Järve II	5	1	0	4	4	24	−20	3
Viljandi JK Tulevik U21	5	0	1	4	9	16	−7	1
