= 2015 Estonian Football Winter Tournament =

Tournament details
- Country: Estonia
- Dates: 9 January 2015 − 7 February 2015
- Teams: 12

The 2015 Estonian Football Winter Tournament or the 2015 EJL Jalgpallihalli Turniir was the second edition of the annual tournament in Estonia. Levadia Tallinn were the defending champions. This tournament was divided into two groups of 6 teams.

== Groups ==
=== Group A ===
Team	Pld	W	D	L	GF	GA	GD	Pts
Flora	6	6	0	0	16	6	+10	18
Infonet	5	3	1	1	16	7	+9	10
Sillamäe Kalev	6	3	1	2	14	19	−5	10
Nõmme Kalju	6	2	1	3	9	9	0	7
Levadia Tallinn	5	1	1	3	6	10	−4	4
Paide Linnameeskond	6	0	0	6	7	17	−10	0

9 January 2015	Flora	2–1	Nõmme Kalju
19:15	Logua 75', 81'		Wakui 8' (pen.)

10 January 2015	Sillamäe Kalev	1–9	Infonet
13:00	Volkov 37'		Jevdokimov 16'; Harin 23', 31'; Ivanov 54', 58'; Elhi 63' (pen.); Gurtšioglujants 66'; Aksjonov 75'; Dõmov 87'	Attendance: 10

10 January 2015	Levadia Tallinn	4–3	Paide Linnameeskond
20:10	Kink 35'; Marin 60'; Saarts 65'; Ntumbanzondo 70'		Vassiljev 17', 35'; Paur 42'

16 January 2015	Infonet	0–3	Flora
19:15			Jürgenson 9' (pen.); Saliste 18'; Kams 62'

17 January 2015	Levadia Tallinn	2–2	Sillamäe Kalev
13:00	Luts 44'; Kink 85'		Plotnikov 51'; Silich 66'

17 January 2015	Paide Linnameeskond	0–2	Nõmme Kalju
20:00			Järva 32'; Holz 87'

20 January 2015	Flora	1–0	Levadia Tallinn
17:45	Frolov 31'

24 January 2015	Nõmme Kalju	1–1	Infonet
10:00	Mööl 48'		Ogorodnik 77'

24 January 2015	Sillamäe Kalev	2–0	Paide Linnameeskond
13:45	Toomet 48', 66'

31 January 2015	Levadia Tallinn	0–1	Nõmme Kalju
11:45			Mööl 56'

31 January 2015	Sillamäe Kalev	3–4	Flora
13:30	Leliūga 13'; Dubõkin 33'; Kvasov 47'		Alliku 10'; Logua 16'; Beglarišvili 44'; Tukiainen 77'

31 January 2015	Paide Linnameeskond	2–3	Infonet
20:45	Kukk 9'; Sinilaid 90+1'		Mašitšev 51'; Melts 51'; Volodin 63'

6 February 2015	Infonet	3–0	Levadia Tallinn
19:30	Malov 31' (pen.); Volodin 62'; Ogorodnik 75'

7 February 2015	Nõmme Kalju	2–3	Sillamäe Kalev
13:30	Junolainen 2'; Kuusk 85'		Kvasov 9'; Sidorenkov 12' (pen.); Plotnikov 66'

7 February 2015	Flora	3–1	Paide Linnameeskond
20:30	Ainsalu 58'; Alliku 71'; Gussev 82'		? 79'

=== Group B ===
Team	Pld	W	D	L	GF	GA	GD	Pts
Narva Trans	6	6	0	0	20	3	+17	18
Viljandi Tulevik	6	4	0	2	8	6	+2	12
Pärnu Linnameeskond	6	4	0	2	6	5	+1	12
Tammeka Tartu	6	2	0	4	5	8	−3	6
Flora II	6	1	0	5	5	12	−7	3
Tallinna Kalev	6	1	0	5	4	14	−10	3

10 January 2015	Flora II	0–3	Tallinna Kalev
14:50			Karpov 3', 24'; Peinar 28'

10 January 2015	Tammeka Tartu	0–2	Viljandi Tulevik
16:30			Peips 70'; Roman 86'

10 January 2015	Narva Trans	3–0	Pärnu Linnameeskond
18:20	Lvov 3'; Mihailov 24'; Roivainen 57'

17 January 2015	Viljandi Tulevik	2–1	Tallinna Kalev
14:45	Post 74'; Peips 84'		Paal 30'

17 January 2015	Pärnu Linnameeskond	1–2	Flora II
16:30	Kaarlimäe 73'		Paal 30'; Siim 63', 64'

17 January 2015	Tammeka Tartu	2–4	Narva Trans
18:15	? 73' ? 87'		Alania 9'; Roivainen 46'; Mihhailov 51'; Škinjov 58'

23 January 2015	Tallinna Kalev	0–2	Pärnu Linnameeskond
19:30			Laurits 31'; Anissimov 84'

24 January 2015	Narva Trans	2–0	Viljandi Tulevik
15:30	Skinjov 36'; Jõgi 71'

24 January 2015	Flora II	0–1	Tammeka Tartu
19:15			Hurt 40'

31 January 2015	Viljandi Tulevik	0–1	Pärnu Linnameeskond
15:15			Laurits 80'

31 January 2015	Tammeka Tartu	2–0	Tallinna Kalev
17:10	Kiidron 17'; Paju 27'

31 January 2015	Narva Trans	3–1	Flora II
19:00	Alania 38'; Lvov 41'; Škinjov 74'		Soerde 50'

7 February 2015	Flora II	1–2	Viljandi Tulevik
15:15	Riiberg 25'		Tamm 21', 29'

7 February 2015	Tallinna Kalev	0–4	Narva Trans
17:00			Andrejev 41', 53', 57'; Gavrilov 63'

7 February 2015	Pärnu Linnameeskond	1–0	Tammeka Tartu
18:55	Laurits 87' (pen.)
