= Roman Kozhukhovskyi =

Ukrainian football manager (born 1979)

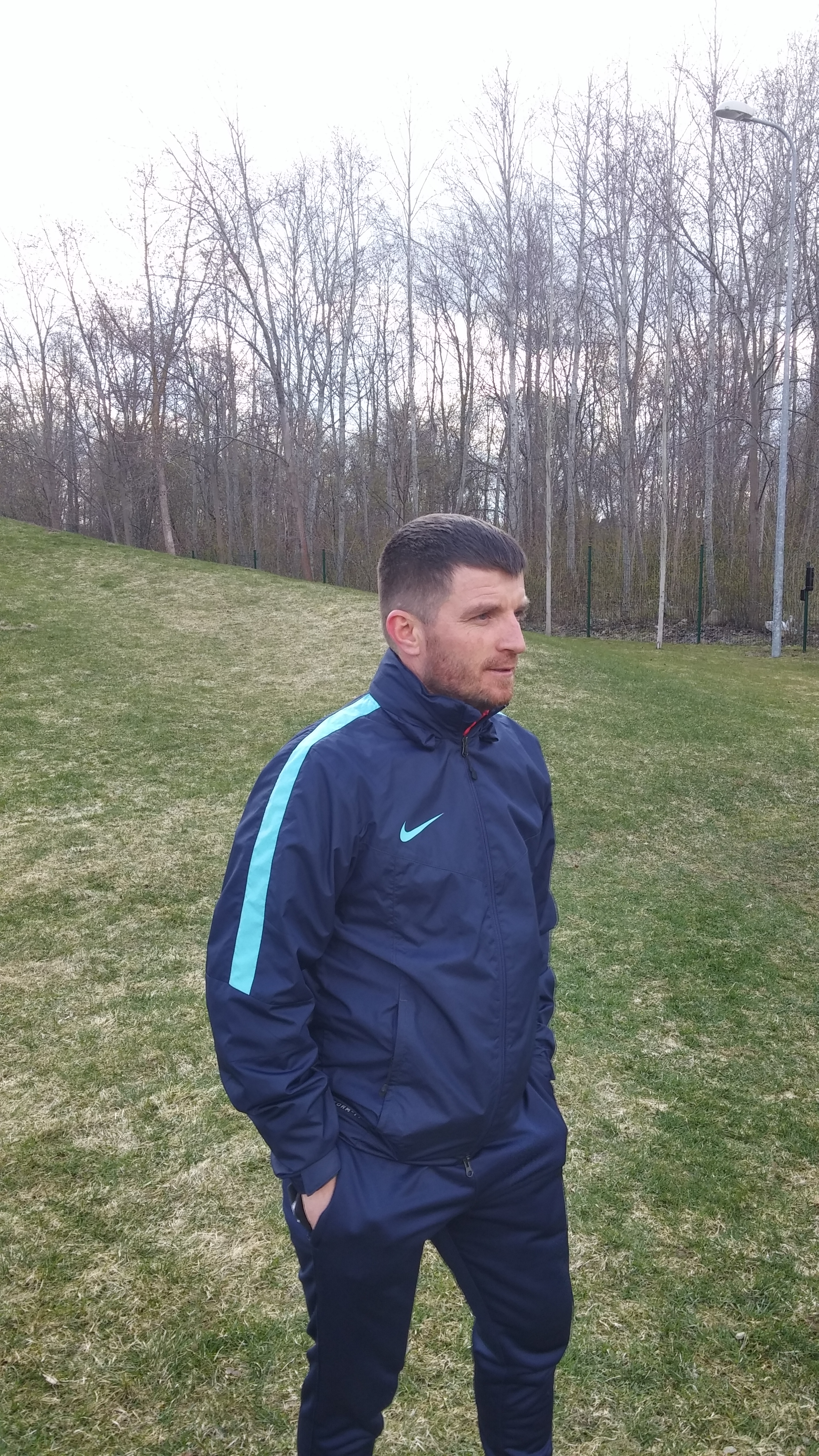
- Kozhukhovskyi in 2017

Personal information
- Date of birth: 24 January 1979 (age 47)
- Place of birth: Vinnytsia, Ukrainian SSR, Soviet Union

Team information
- Current team: JK Narva Trans (manager)

Managerial career
- Years: Team
- 2014–2015: Sillamäe Kalev II
- 2015–2016: Jõhvi Lokomotiv
- 2016: Koper (assistant)
- 2017: JK Järve
- 2018: Chornomorets Odesa (assistant)
- 2018: Karpaty Lviv (assistant)
- 2018–2019: Nõmme Kalju U21
- 2019: Nõmme Kalju
- 2020–2024: FC Kuressaare
- 2021–2022: Estonia U21
- 2025–: JK Narva Trans

Roman Kozhukhovskyi (Ukrainian: Роман Степанович Кожуховський; born 24 January 1979) is a Ukrainian professional football manager who has been the manager of Estonian Premium Liiga club JK Narva Trans since 2025.

== Coaching career ==
Roman Kozhukhovskyi began his coaching career in Ukraine in 2004 and was appointed as head coach of Estonian II liiga club Jõhvi Lokomotiv on 1 July 2015. In July 2016, he joined Slovenian top division club FC Koper as an assistant coach. In 2017, he coached Estonian Esiliiga B club JK Järve.

Kozhukhovskyi returned to Ukraine in 2018 and signed with Ukrainian Premier League club FC Chornomorets Odesa as an assistant coach. On 8 June 2018, he became the assistant coach of Ukrainian Premier League club FC Karpaty Lviv.

In November 2018, Kozhukhovskyi took charge of the Nõmme Kalju FC U21 team, whilst also becoming the first team assistant coach. On 25 April 2019, he was appointed as interim head coach of Kalju and was named as Premium Liiga coach of the month for May, leading to his official appointment for the head coach position in June. Although Kozhukhovskyi led Kalju to the second qualifying round in the UEFA Champions League and went 28 matches unbeaten in the league, his contract was not extended for the following season.

Kozhukhovskyi became the head coach of FC Kuressaare in 2020. Under his guidance, the semi-professional Kuressaare transformed from annual relegation candidates into a competitive mid-table side, finishing 7th in 2021, before the most successful season in Kuressaare's history saw them finish in 5th place with 50 points in 2022. In 2021 and 2022, Kozhukhovskyi also simultaneously worked as the Estonia U21 national team head coach.

On 31 December 2024, JK Narva Trans announced they have signed Kozhukhovskyi as their new head coach.

== Honours ==
Individual

- Meistriliiga Manager of the Month: May 2019, October 2019, August 2022, April 2024, May 2025
