= 2019 Meistriliiga =

29th season of the Meistriliiga

Meistriliiga
- Season: 2019
- Dates: 8 March – 9 November 2019
- Champions: Flora; 12th title
- Relegated: Maardu Linnameeskond
- Champions League: Flora
- Europa League: FCI Levadia; Nõmme Kalju; Paide Linnameeskond
- Matches: 180
- Goals: 597 (3.32 per match)
- Top goalscorer: Erik Sorga (31 goals)
- Biggest home win: FCI Levadia 8–0 Maardu (31 March 2019)
- Biggest away win: Maardu 0–12 Flora (9 November 2019)
- Highest scoring: Maardu 0–12 Flora (9 November 2019)

The 2019 Meistriliiga (known as A. Le Coq Premium Liiga for sponsorship reasons) was the 29th season of the Meistriliiga, the top Estonian league for association football clubs. The season began on 8 March 2019 and concluded on 9 November 2019. Nõmme Kalju were the defending champions. Flora won their 12th Meistriliiga title.

== Teams ==
Ten teams competed in the league, nine sides from the 2018 season and 2018 Esiliiga champions Maardu Linnameeskond. Vaprus were relegated at the end of the 2018 season after finishing in the bottom of the table. Maardu Linnameeskond made their Meistriliiga debut having previously declined promotion after winning the 2017 Esiliiga. Kuressaare retained their Meistriliiga spot after winning a relegation playoff against Esiliiga runners-up Elva.

=== Venues ===
Locations of the 2019 Meistriliiga teams

Team	Location	Stadium	Capacity
FCI Levadia	Tallinn	A. Le Coq Arena	14,336
Flora	Tallinn	A. Le Coq Arena	14,336
Kuressaare	Kuressaare	Kuressaare linnastaadion	1,000
Maardu Linnameeskond	Maardu	Maardu linnastaadion	500
Narva Trans	Narva	Narva Kreenholm Stadium	1,065
Nõmme Kalju	Tallinn	Hiiu Stadium	650
Paide Linnameeskond	Paide	Paide linnastaadion	268
Tallinna Kalev	Tallinn	Kalevi Keskstaadion artificial turf	570
Tammeka	Tartu	Tartu Tamme Stadium	1,500
Tulevik	Viljandi	Viljandi linnastaadion	1,084

=== Personnel and kits ===
Team	Manager	Captain	Kit manufacturer	Shirt sponsor
FCI Levadia	(Estonia) Vladimir Vassiljev (interim)	(Estonia) Dmitri Kruglov	Adidas	Viimsi Keevitus
Flora	(Estonia) Jürgen Henn	(Estonia) Gert Kams	Nike	Tele2
Kuressaare	(Latvia) Dmitrijs Kalašņikovs	(Estonia) Elari Valmas	Nike	Euronics
Maardu Linnameeskond	(Estonia) Mark Kolk (interim)	(Estonia) Ilja Zelentsov	Adidas	
Narva Trans	(Estonia) Oleg Kurotškin (interim)	(Estonia) Marko Meerits	Nike	Sportland
Nõmme Kalju	(Ukraine) Roman Kozhukhovskyi	(Estonia) Igor Subbotin	Adidas	
Paide Linnameeskond	(Estonia) Vjatšeslav Zahovaiko	(Estonia) Andre Frolov	Nike	Verston
Tallinna Kalev	(Estonia) Aleksandr Dmitrijev	(Estonia) Andreas Raudsepp	Nike	Coolbet
Tammeka	(Estonia) Kaido Koppel	(Estonia) Tauno Tekko	Nike	Metec
Tulevik	(Estonia) Sander Post	(Estonia) Kaimar Saag	Joma	Espak

=== Managerial changes ===
Team	Outgoing manager	Manner of departure	Date of vacancy	Position in table	Incoming manager	Date of appointment
Tallinna Kalev	(Estonia) Argo Arbeiter	Signed by KTP	8 November 2018	Pre-season	(Estonia) Aleksandr Dmitrijev	28 December 2018
Narva Trans	(Turkey) Cenk Özcan	Mutual consent	1 December 2018	Pre-season	(Latvia) Dmitrijs Kalašņikovs	4 January 2019
Nõmme Kalju	(Russia) Sergei Frantsev	Sacked	25 April 2019	4th	(Ukraine) Roman Kozhukhovskyi	25 April 2019
Narva Trans	(Latvia) Dmitrijs Kalašņikovs	Sacked	29 April 2019	4th	(Estonia) Valeri Bondarenko (interim)	29 April 2019
Narva Trans	(Estonia) Valeri Bondarenko	End of caretaker spell	1 June 2019	5th	(Russia) Andrei Syomin	1 June 2019
Kuressaare	(Estonia) Jan Važinski	Mutual consent	22 August 2019	7th	(Latvia) Dmitrijs Kalašņikovs	22 August 2019
Narva Trans	(Russia) Andrei Syomin	Resigned	23 August 2019	6th	(Estonia) Oleg Kurotškin (interim)	23 August 2019
FCI Levadia	(Serbia) Aleksandar Rogić	Mutual consent	15 September 2019	2nd	(Estonia) Vladimir Vassiljev (interim)	15 September 2019
Maardu Linnameeskond	(Estonia) Andrei Borissov	Mutual consent	3 October 2019	10th	(Estonia) Mark Kolk (interim)	3 October 2019

== League table ==
Pos	Team	Pld	W	D	L	GF	GA	GD	Pts	Qualification or relegation
1	Flora (C)	36	29	3	4	110	21	+89	90	Qualification for the Champions League first qualifying round
2	FCI Levadia	36	24	6	6	98	32	+66	78	Qualification for the Europa League first qualifying round
3	Nõmme Kalju	36	22	11	3	79	34	+45	77	Qualification for the Europa League first qualifying round
4	Paide Linnameeskond	36	23	5	8	78	30	+48	74	Qualification for the Europa League first qualifying round
5	Tammeka	36	14	7	15	57	62	−5	49	
6	Narva Trans	36	13	9	14	57	49	+8	48	
7	Tulevik	36	7	7	22	35	75	−40	28	
8	Tallinna Kalev	36	6	6	24	29	89	−60	24	
9	Kuressaare (O)	36	6	5	25	24	87	−63	23	Qualification for the Relegation play-offs
10	Maardu Linnameeskond (R)	36	4	5	27	30	118	−88	17	Relegation to the Esiliiga

Source: Estonian Football Association (in Estonian), UEFA
Rules for classification: 1) Points; 2) Less matches awarded against; 3) Head-to-head points; 4) Head-to-head goal difference; 5) Matches won; 6) Goal difference; 7) Goals scored; 8) Away goals scored; 9) Fairplay ranking.
(C) Champions; (O) Play-off winners; (R) Relegated

=== Relegation play-offs ===
At season's end Kuressaare, the ninth place club, participated in a two-legged play-off with the runners-up (of independent teams) of the 2019 Esiliiga, Vaprus, for the spot in 2020 Meistriliiga.

16 November 2019	Vaprus	1–4	Kuressaare	Pärnu
13:00 (UTC+2)	Saarts 23'	Report	Pajunurm 43' (pen.); Opp 51'; Komissarov 66'; Seeman 68'	Stadium: Pärnu Rannastaadion; Attendance: 344; Referee: Joonas Jaanovits

23 November 2019	Kuressaare	1–2	Vaprus	Kuressaare
13:00 (UTC+2)	Pajunurm 23' (pen.)	Report	Grahv 60'; Saarts 75'	Stadium: Kuressaare kunstmurustaadion Attendance: 194; Referee: Kristo Tohver

Kuressaare won 5–3 on aggregate and retained their Meistriliiga spot for the 2020 season.

== Results ==
Each team played every opponent four times, twice at home and twice away. A total of 180 matches were played, with 36 matches by each team.

=== First half of season ===
Home \ Away	LEV	FLO	KUR	MAA	NAR	NÕM	PAI	KLV	TAM	TUL
FCI Levadia	—	1–2	5–0	8–0	2–0	0–0	1–1	5–1	7–0	5–2
Flora	1–3	—	5–0	6–0	2–2	0–1	4–1	6–0	4–1	2–0
Kuressaare	0–1	0–4	—	1–0	1–1	0–0	0–1	2–0	1–1	1–0
Maardu	1–6	3–8	1–0	—	0–1	0–5	1–4	0–0	2–1	0–0
Narva Trans	1–2	0–1	0–0	5–1	—	0–0	0–1	2–2	2–5	0–1
Nõmme Kalju	2–1	0–3	3–2	6–0	3–2	—	0–2	2–2	2–0	2–1
Paide	0–2	0–1	7–0	2–0	0–0	0–2	—	2–0	2–1	6–0
Tallinna Kalev	1–6	0–2	3–0	2–0	0–4	0–1	0–3	—	0–4	0–2
Tammeka	1–2	0–2	1–1	2–2	1–2	0–0	0–3	2–0	—	0–1
Tulevik	0–3	1–3	1–2	2–0	1–1	2–3	2–2	1–2	0–4	—

Source: Estonian Football Association (in Estonian)
Legend: Blue = home team win; Yellow = draw; Red = away team win.

=== Second half of season ===
Home \ Away	LEV	FLO	KUR	MAA	NAR	NÕM	PAI	KLV	TAM	TUL
FCI Levadia	—	1–2	2–1	3–1	1–0	1–1	3–2	7–0	1–1	1–1
Flora	2–1	—	7–0	3–0	1–0	1–1	1–0	5–0	0–1	3–0
Kuressaare	0–3	0–3	—	1–0	0–1	0–3	0–3	0–1	0–1	4–1
Maardu	1–4	0–12	2–1	—	1–3	1–4	2–4	2–2	0–1	2–2
Narva Trans	1–3	0–1	4–2	5–2	—	1–1	0–1	2–0	3–2	3–2
Nõmme Kalju	2–1	2–1	7–2	4–0	2–2	—	1–1	6–0	2–3	2–2
Paide	3–1	1–1	6–1	5–0	1–0	0–1	—	2–1	2–0	4–0
Tallinna Kalev	0–1	0–2	2–1	1–4	0–3	2–3	0–2	—	1–2	3–0
Tammeka	1–1	1–6	4–0	2–0	6–4	1–2	3–2	2–2	—	1–3
Tulevik	0–3	0–3	3–0	2–1	0–2	0–3	1–2	1–1	0–1	—

Source: Estonian Football Association (in Estonian)
Legend: Blue = home team win; Yellow = draw; Red = away team win.

== Season statistics ==
=== Top scorers ===
Rank	Player	Club	Goals
1	(Estonia) Erik Sorga	Flora	31
2	(Russia) Nikita Andreev	FCI Levadia	13
2	(The Gambia) Alassana Jatta	Paide Linnameeskond	13
2	(United States) Eric McWoods	Narva Trans	13
2	(Estonia) Kaimar Saag	Tulevik	13
6	(Estonia) Herol Riiberg	Flora	12
6	(Estonia) Konstantin Vassiljev	Flora	12
8	(Brazil) João Morelli	FCI Levadia	11
8	(Estonia) Sten Reinkort	Tammeka	11
8	(Estonia) Mark Oliver Roosnupp	FCI Levadia	11
8	(Ivory Coast) Yann Michael Yao	Paide Linnameeskond	11

=== Hat-tricks ===
Player	For	Against	Result	Date
(Estonia) Erik Sorga^{4}	Flora	Maardu Linnameeskond	6–0 (H)	7 April 2019
(Estonia) Mark Oliver Roosnupp	FCI Levadia	Tammeka	7–0 (H)	11 May 2019
(Russia) Aleksandr Zakarlyuka	Narva Trans	Maardu Linnameeskond	5–1 (H)	22 May 2019
(Brazil) Liliu	Nõmme Kalju	Maardu Linnameeskond	6–0 (H)	1 June 2019
(Japan) Kotaro Amemiya	Maardu Linnameeskond	Flora	3–8 (H)	15 June 2019
(The Gambia) Alassana Jatta^{5}	Paide Linnameeskond	Kuressaare	7–0 (H)	19 June 2019
(Brazil) João Morelli	FCI Levadia	Maardu Linnameeskond	6–1 (A)	29 June 2019
(Nigeria) Jasper Uwaegbulam	Maardu Linnameeskond	Tallinna Kalev	4–1 (A)	7 July 2019
(United States) Eric McWoods	Narva Trans	Tulevik	3–2 (H)	21 July 2019
(New Zealand) Max Mata	Nõmme Kalju	Kuressaare	7–2 (H)	3 August 2019
(Estonia) Erik Sorga	Flora	Kuressaare	3–0 (A)	13 August 2019
(Estonia) Patrick Genro Veelma	Tammeka	Narva Trans	6–4 (H)	16 August 2019
(Estonia) Indrek Ilves	Tulevik	Tammeka	3–1 (A)	20 October 2019

^{4} Player scored four goals
^{5} Player scored five goals

=== Average attendance ===
Club	Average attendance
Flora	711
Tammeka	461
Tulevik	386
FCI Levadia	365
Nõmme Kalju	363
Paide Linnameeskond	349
Narva Trans	318
Tallinna Kalev	252
Maardu Linnameeskond	224
Kuressaare	209
League average	364

== Awards ==
=== Monthly awards ===
Month	Manager of the Month		Player of the Month	
Month	Manager	Club	Player	Club
March	(Estonia) Jürgen Henn	Flora	(Estonia) Magnus Karofeld	Kuressaare
April	(Estonia) Jürgen Henn	Flora	(Estonia) Märten Kuusk	Flora
May	(Ukraine) Roman Kozhukhovskyi	Nõmme Kalju	(Cameroon) Marcelin Gando	FCI Levadia
June	(Serbia) Aleksandar Rogić	FCI Levadia	(The Gambia) Alassana Jatta	Paide Linnameeskond
July	(Estonia) Vjatšeslav Zahovaiko	Paide Linnameeskond	(United States) Eric McWoods	Narva Trans
August	(Estonia) Kaido Koppel	Tammeka	(Ivory Coast) Yann Michael Yao	Paide Linnameeskond
September	(Estonia) Jürgen Henn	Flora	(Estonia) Sander Sinilaid	Paide Linnameeskond
October	(Ukraine) Roman Kozhukhovskyi	Nõmme Kalju	(Estonia) Eduard Golovljov	Narva Trans

== Player transfers ==
- Winter 2018–19 – before the season

== See also ==
- 2019 in Estonian football
