= Eric McWoods =

American soccer player

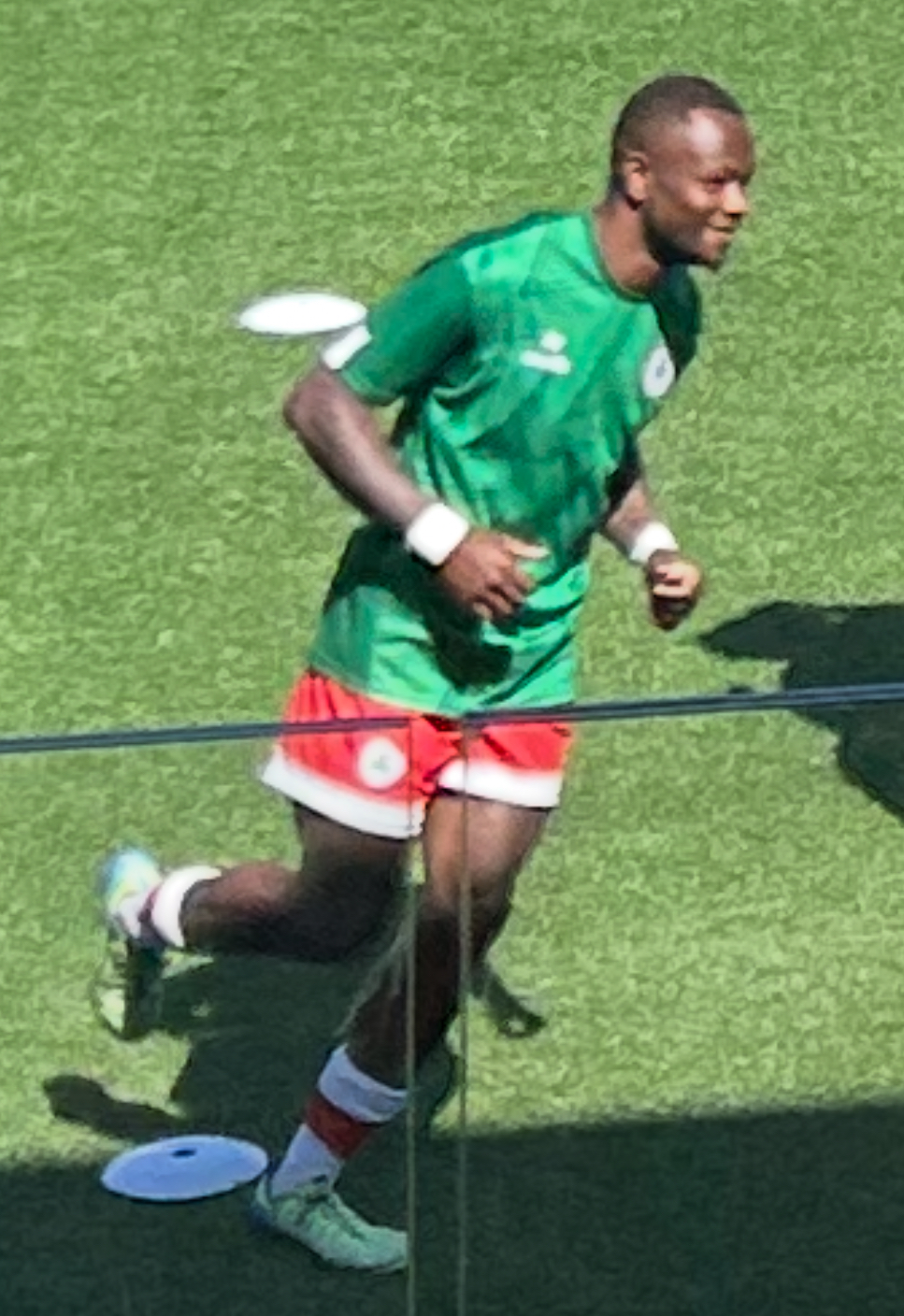
- McWoods with Cliftonville in 2025

Personal information
- Date of birth: October 21, 1995 (age 31)
- Place of birth: St. Louis, Missouri, United States
- Height: 1.73 m (5 ft 8 in)
- Position: Forward

Team information
- Current team: Cliftonville
- Number: 32

College career
Years	Team	Apps	(Gls)
2014–2015	Xavier Musketeers	35	(2)
2016–2017	Kansas City Roos		

Senior career*
Years	Team	Apps	(Gls)
2018–2019	Kaw Valley	12	(3)
2019	Narva Trans	31	(13)
2020	Zalaegerszeg	6	(1)
2020–2021	Balzan	14	(1)
2021–2022	Al-Aqaba	0	(0)
2022	Finn Harps	25	(5)
2023	Sandviken	10	(2)
2025–	Cliftonville	31	(6)
- * Club domestic league appearances and goals as of 23 February 2026

Eric McWoods (born October 21, 1995) is an American professional soccer player who plays as a forward for NIFL Premiership club Cliftonville.

== Early years ==
A St. Louis native, McWoods began playing soccer at the age of eight after his parents refused to let him play American football. He played at Kirkwood High School for four years, where he set school records for goals scored in a game (5), season (40) and career (87). His senior year, he was named an All-American and the NHSCAA Missouri State Offensive Player of Year. He also played basketball and ran track and field.

== Club career ==
=== Narva Trans ===
McWoods signed for Narva Trans in January 2019. In his first season, he helped to win the Estonian Cup for the 2018–19 edition. He scored a hat-trick on July 21, 2019, against Tulevik in a 3–2 home win. His form in July continued and he ended up becoming the Player of the Month for July of the 2019 Meistriliiga season. In winning the Estonian Cup, McWoods and Narva qualified for the 2019–20 UEFA Europa League. They played in the first qualifying round and were drawn against Budućnost of Montenegro. Over the two-leg affair, Narva was beaten by an aggregate score of 6–1.

=== ZTE ===
In January 2020, McWoods moved to Hungarian side ZTE of the NB I.

=== Balzan ===
In the summer of 2020, McWoods moved to Balzan of the Maltese Premier League.

=== Finn Harps ===
After a short spell in Jordan with Al-Aqaba, McWoods moved to the League of Ireland Premier Division to join Finn Harps for the 2022 season.

=== Sandviken ===
On March 2, 2023, McWoods signed for Swedish side Sandvikens IF.

=== Cliftonville ===
On 30 January 2025, McWoods signed for NIFL Premiership club Cliftonville after a year out of the game.

== Honors ==
Narva Trans

- Estonian Cup: 2018–19

=== Individual ===
- Meistriliiga Player of the Month: July 2019
