= Siim Roops =

Estonian footballer

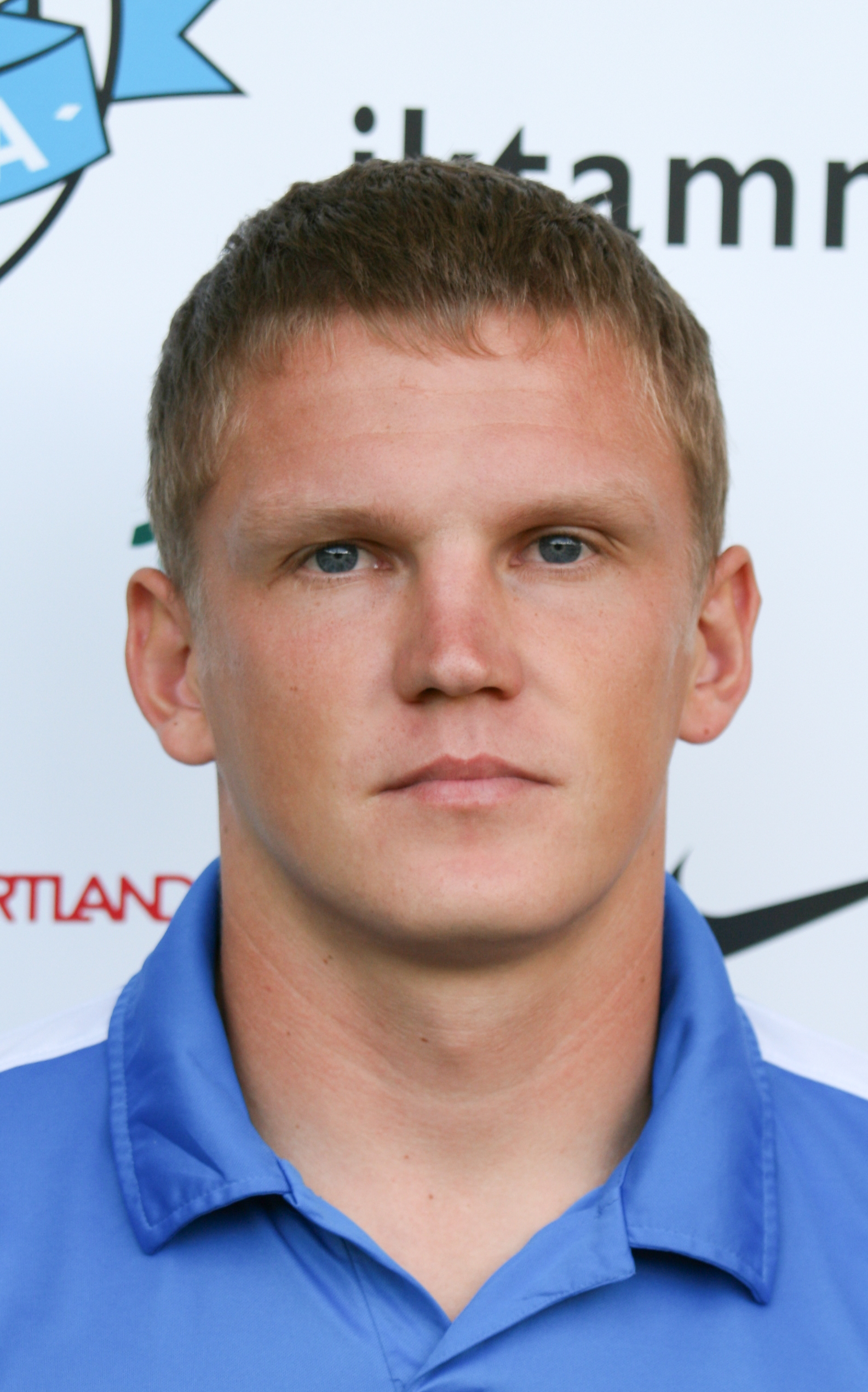

Personal information
- Full name: Siim Roops
- Date of birth: 4 March 1986 (age 40)
- Place of birth: Tartu, then part of Estonian SSR, Soviet Union
- Height: 1.82 m (6 ft 0 in)
- Position: Centre back

Senior career*
| Years | Team | Apps | (Gls) |
| 2002–2006 | JK Tammeka Tartu | 61 | (8) |
| 2007–2009 | FC Flora Tallinn | 11 | (0) |
| 2007 | → Valdres FK (loan) | | |
| 2008–2009 | → JK Viljandi Tulevik (loan) | 6 | (0) |
| 2010–2012 | JK Tammeka Tartu | 48 | (3) |
| 2012–2013 | FK Jerv | 13 | (0) |
| 2014–2018 | Tartu FC Santos | 92 | (10) |
| Total | | 231+ | (21+) |

International career
| 2007 | Estonia | 1 | (0) |
- * Club domestic league appearances and goals as of 4 September 2020

Siim Roops (born 4 March 1986 in Tartu) is an Estonian footballer.

== Career ==
He started his career in JK Tammeka Tartu. In 2007, he joined Valdres FK from FC Flora Tallinn. He later returned to Estonia and Flora Tallinn. He joined JK Viljandi Tulevik on loan, and later rejoined JK Tammeka. In 2012, he signed for FK Jerv in Norway. In 2014, he moved to Santos Tartu in Estonia. He subsequently joined FC Otepää in 2019, where he currently remains an active player.

He plays the position of defender and is 1.82 m tall.

== International career ==
He made his national team debut for Estonia on 3 February 2007 against Poland, becoming 200th player to play for the country.
