= Mati Lember =

Estonian footballer

Personal information
- Full name: Mati Lember
- Date of birth: 21 July 1985 (age 41)
- Place of birth: Tallinn, then part of Estonian SSR, Soviet Union
- Height: 1.75 m (5 ft 9 in)
- Position: Defensive midfielder

International career^{‡}
Years	Team	Apps	(Gls)
2004–2007	Estonia	2	(0)
- ‡ National team caps and goals as of 19 December 2007

Mati Lember (born 21 July 1985) is a retired Estonian football player who played in different Estonian association football teams, with a small experience in the Estonia national football team between 2004 and 2007. He used to play in the position of defensive midfielder. He is 1.75 metres (5.7 ft) tall and weighs 72 kilograms (159 lb).

In 2017, he decided to retire from professional football at the age of 32.

== Club career ==
Career statistics by season, club and competition
Season	Club	Competition	Matches played	Goals	Yellow cards	Red cards	Minutes played
2001	Pärnu JK Trevis	Esiliiga (2. league)	11	–	2	–	873'
2001	FC Kuressaare	Meistriliiga (1. league)	5	–	–	–	300'
2002	FC Valga Warrior	Esiliiga (2. league)	19	1	–	1	1680'
2003	FC Valga Warrior	Meistriliiga (1. league)	23	–	2	–	2070'
2004	Pärnu JK Trevis	Esiliiga (2. league)	22	–	3	–	2000'
2004	Flora Tallinn	Meistriliiga (1. league)	7	–	1	–	452'
2005	Viljandi JK Tulevik	Meistriliiga (1. league)	30	1	5	–	2602'
2006	Viljandi JK Tulevik	Meistriliiga (1. league)	28	–	6	1	2446'
2007	Viljandi JK Tulevik	Meistriliiga (1. league)	34	2	2	–	2482'
2008	Nõmme Kalju FC	Meistriliiga (1. league)	14	1	–	–	2514'
2008	JK Tallinna Kalev	Meistriliiga (1. league)	15	1	–	–	2514'
2009	JK Tallinna Kalev	Meistriliiga (1. league)	30	1	5	–	1822'
2010	HÜJK Emmaste	II liiga löuna/lääs (3. league)	26	2	1	–	2025'
2011	HÜJK Emmaste	II liiga löuna/lääs (3. league)	23	2	1	–	1879'
2012	HÜJK Emmaste	II liiga löuna/lääs (3. league)	19	3	1	–	1331'
2013	HÜJK Emmaste	Esiliiga B (3. league)	19	–	4	1	1110'
2014	HÜJK Emmaste	Esiliiga B (3. league)	17	1	3	–	863'
2015	HÜJK Emmaste	Esiliiga B (3. league)	25	4	7	–	1502'
2016	Viimsi JK	Esiliiga B (3. league)	9	–	–	–	539'
		TOTAL	376	19	43	3	28.490'

== International career ==
During his national team career, he was capped 2 times. He debuted internationally in 2004. He also played for the Estonia national team U-21 more than 20 times.
