= Henri Järvelaid =

Estonian footballer (born 1998)

Personal information
- Full name: Henri Järvelaid
- Date of birth: 11 December 1998 (age 27)
- Place of birth: Tallinn, Estonia
- Height: 1.78 m (5 ft 10 in)
- Position: Left-back

Team information
- Current team: Nõmme United
- Number: 45

Youth career
- –2015: Nõmme United

Senior career*
Years	Team	Apps	(Gls)
2015–2019	Flora U21	56	(17)
2016–2020	Flora	52	(9)
2018	→ Tammeka (loan)	17	(2)
2020–2021	Vendsyssel	18	(0)
2021	Sogndal	0	(0)
2022–2023	Nõmme Kalju	43	(2)
2023–2025	FCI Levadia	17	(3)
2024–2025	FCI Levadia U21	17	(1)
2025	→ Tammeka (loan)	12	(1)
2026–	Nõmme United	34	(2)

International career^{‡}
2013	Estonia U16	2	(0)
2014	Estonia U17	9	(1)
2015	Estonia U18	1	(0)
2015–2016	Estonia U19	18	(1)
2017–2018	Estonia U21	15	(0)
2019	Estonia U23	1	(0)
2020	Estonia	4	(0)
- * Club domestic league appearances and goals as of 17 November 2026 ‡ National team caps and goals as of 30 August 2022

Henri Järvelaid (born 11 December 1998) is an Estonian professional footballer who plays as a left back for Estonian club Nõmme United.

== Club career ==
In 2014, Järvelaid trained with Tottenham Hotspur and Birmingham City academies, but the trials did not lead to a contract.

On 24 August 2020, Järvelaid moved to Danish 1st Division club Vendsyssel FF, signing a deal until June 2023. On 1 September 2021, Järvelaid left Vendsyssel and joined Norwegian club Sogndal IL on a deal for the remaining of 2021.

== Honours ==
Flora

- Meistriliiga: 2017, 2019
- Estonian Supercup: 2020
