= 2018 Estonian Football Winter Tournament =

Tournament details
- Country: Estonia
- Dates: 5 January − 17 February 2018 (Group A, B)
- Teams: 30

Tournament statistics
- Matches played: 6
- Goals scored: 25 (4.17 per match)

The 2018 Estonian Football Winter Tournament or the 2018 EJL Jalgpallihalli Turniir was the fifth edition of the annual tournament in Estonia. It was divided into five groups of 6 teams.

== Group A ==
Team	Pld	W	D	L	GF	GA	GD	Pts
Nõmme Kalju FC	5	5	0	0	23	3	+20	15
FC Flora	5	3	1	1	12	6	+6	10
FCI Levadia Tallinn	5	2	1	2	7	14	−7	7
JK Narva Trans	5	0	3	2	7	10	−3	3
Tartu JK Tammeka	5	0	3	2	3	8	−5	3
Paide Linnameeskond	5	0	2	3	7	18	−11	2

5 January 2018
16:45

Paide Linnameeskond	0–4	FC Flora
	Report	Markus Poom 23'; Gert Kams 34'; Herol Riiberg 47'; Kristjan Kask 80'

Lilleküla Stadium
Attendance: 75
Referee: Joonas Jaanovits
6 January 2018
14:00

Nõmme Kalju FC	10–0	FCI Levadia Tallinn
Henrik Pürg 1'; Igor Subbotin 6'; Deniss Tjapkin 9'; Liliu 31'; Alex Mattias Tamm 45'; Héctor Núñez 54', 73', 76', 87'; Kyrylo Silich 82' (pen.)	Report

Lilleküla Stadium
Attendance: 121
Referee: Kristo Külljastinen
6 January 2018
15:40

Tartu JK Tammeka	0–0	JK Narva Trans
	Report

Lilleküla Stadium
Attendance: 35

== Group B ==
Team	Pld	W	D	L	GF	GA	GD	Pts
FC Kuressaare	5	3	1	1	9	7	+2	10
Maardu Linnameeskond	5	2	2	1	9	9	0	8
Viljandi JK Tulevik	5	2	1	2	8	9	−1	7
FC Flora U21	5	2	1	2	9	6	+3	7
JK Tallinna Kalev	4	1	1	2	5	6	−1	4
Pärnu JK Vaprus	4	0	2	2	3	6	−3	2

5 January 2018
18:30

Viljandi JK Tulevik	2–1	Pärnu JK Vaprus
Indrek Ilves 26', 28'	Report	Tonis Vihmoja 89'

Lilleküla Stadium
Attendance: 31
Referee: Karl Koppel
5 January 2018
21:15

JK Tallinna Kalev	2–3	Maardu Linnameeskond
Kevin Kauber 19'; Karl Anton Sõerde 89'	Report	Vadim Šalabai 52'; Vladislav Ogorodnik 64'; Vitali Gussev 72'

Lilleküla Stadium
Attendance: 60
Referee: Dmitri Kirilov
6 January 2018
12:15

FC Flora U21	3–0	FC Kuressaare
Georg-Marten Meumers 68'; Daniel Fedotov 86'; Aleksandr Šapovalov 87'	Report

Lilleküla Stadium
Attendance: 85
Referee: Tanel Üprus

== Group C ==
Team	Pld	W	D	L	GF	GA	GD	Pts
Nõmme Kalju FC U21	5	3	0	2	9	7	+2	9
Tartu FC Santos	4	2	1	1	12	6	+6	7
Tartu JK Welco	4	2	1	1	6	6	0	7
Rakvere JK Tarvas	5	2	1	2	7	8	−1	7
FCI Levadia U21	5	1	2	2	6	7	−1	5
JK Tallinna Kalev U21	5	0	3	2	4	10	−6	3

== Group D ==
Team	Pld	W	D	L	GF	GA	GD	Pts
Tallinna JK Legion	5	4	0	1	13	6	+7	12
Kohtla-Järve JK Järve	4	2	1	1	12	7	+5	7
FC Nõmme United	5	2	1	2	10	10	0	7
Tartu JK Tammeka U21	3	2	0	1	5	3	+2	6
Vändra JK Vaprus	4	1	0	3	10	12	−2	3
Keila JK	5	1	0	4	6	18	−12	3

== Group E ==
Team	Pld	W	D	L	GF	GA	GD	Pts
Viimsi JK	5	3	0	2	14	10	+4	9
Paide Linnameeskond U21	5	2	2	1	8	8	0	8
Lasnamäe FC Ajax	5	2	2	1	9	8	+1	8
Pärnu JK	4	2	1	1	18	8	+10	7
FC Flora U19	5	1	0	4	8	20	−12	3
Võru FC Helios	4	1	0	3	6	9	−3	3
