= Mark Oliver Roosnupp =

Estonian footballer (born 1997)

Personal information
- Full name: Mark Oliver Roosnupp
- Date of birth: 12 May 1997 (age 29)
- Place of birth: Tallinn, Estonia
- Height: 1.76 m (5 ft 9 1/2 in)
- Position: Midfielder

Team information
- Current team: Levadia
- Number: 5

Youth career
- 2007–2008: Oper academy
- 2009–2013: Nõmme United

Senior career*
Years	Team	Apps	(Gls)
2013	Nõmme United	19	(14)
2014–2018	FCI Levadia U21	55	(36)
2015–2022	FCI Levadia	174	(47)
2016	→ Paide Linnameeskond (loan)	31	(5)
2023	Napredak Kruševac	12	(0)
2023–	FCI Levadia	118	(23)

International career^{‡}
2012	Estonia U16	1	(0)
2012–2013	Estonia U17	20	(1)
2014–2015	Estonia U19	17	(2)
2016–2018	Estonia U21	17	(1)
2017–2021	Estonia	10	(0)
- * Club domestic league appearances and goals as of 17 November 2026 ‡ National team caps and goals as of 30 August 2022

Mark Oliver Roosnupp (born 12 May 1997) is an Estonian professional footballer who plays as a midfielder for Premium Liiga club Levadia.

== Club career ==
On 4 January 2023 it was announced that Roosnupp would join Serbian Superliga club Napredak Kruševac on a 1,5 year deal.

== International career ==
Roosnupp made his senior international debut for Estonia on 19 November 2017, replacing Rauno Sappinen in the 60th minute of a 2–0 away win over Fiji in a friendly.

== Honours ==
FCI Levadia

- Estonian Cup: 2017–18
- Estonian Supercup: 2015, 2018

Individual

- Meistriliiga Goal of the Month: June 2017,
