= Andrei Syomin =

Russian footballer

Personal information
- Full name: Andrei Yuryevich Syomin
- Date of birth: 26 August 1969 (age 57)
- Place of birth: Moscow, Russian SFSR
- Height: 1.76 m (5 ft 9 in)
- Positions: Midfielder; forward

Senior career*
Years	Team	Apps	(Gls)
1988–1989	FC Lokomotiv Moscow	0	(0)
1989–1990	FC Dynamo-2 Moscow	2	(0)
1990	FC Metallurg Magnitogorsk	4	(0)
1991	FC Lokomotiv Moscow	0	(0)
1992	FC Lokomotiv-d Moscow	2	(0)
1992	FC Fakel Voronezh	4	(0)
1993	FC Viktor-Avangard Kolomna	4	(0)
1993	Joensuun Pallo		
1994–1995	FC Mosenergo Moscow	50	(1)
1996	FC Industriya Borovsk	30	(1)
1997	FC Lokomotiv-d Moscow	11	(0)

Managerial career
- 1998–2000: FC Lokomotiv-d Moscow
- 2001–2004: FC Lokomotiv Moscow (reserves)
- 2004–2005: FC Baltika Kaliningrad
- 2007: FC SOYUZ-Gazprom Izhevsk
- 2009: FC Kuban Krasnodar (assistant)
- 2010: FC Dynamo Bryansk (assistant)
- 2011: FC Dinamo Minsk (assistant)
- 2013: FC Torpedo Moscow (assistant)
- 2013–2014: Gabala FK (assistant)
- 2014–2015: FC Mordovia Saransk (assistant)
- 2015: FC Anzhi Makhachkala (assistant)
- 2016–2017: FC Znamya Truda Orekhovo-Zuyevo
- 2017: FC Mordovia Saransk
- 2018: FC Znamya Truda Orekhovo-Zuyevo
- 2019: Narva Trans
- 2021: FC Rotor Volgograd (assistant)
- 2023: FC Zenit Penza
- * Club domestic league appearances and goals

Andrei Yuryevich Syomin (Russian: Андрей Юрьевич Сёмин; born 26 August 1969) is a Russian professional football coach and a former player.

== Personal life ==
He is a son of Yuri Syomin.
