= Marco Lukka =

Estonian footballer (born 1996)

Personal information
- Full name: Marco Lukka
- Date of birth: 4 December 1996 (age 29)
- Place of birth: Pärnu, Estonia
- Height: 1.87 m (6 ft 1 1/2 in)
- Position: Left-back

Team information
- Current team: Kuressaare
- Number: 21

Youth career
- 2006–2012: Vaprus

Senior career*
Years	Team	Apps	(Gls)
2012–2015	Vändra II	35	(6)
2012–2015	Vändra	83	(9)
2015	Kerho 07	4	(0)
2016	Pärnu Linnameeskond	33	(0)
2017–2019	Flora	16	(0)
2017–2019	Flora U21	35	(1)
2018	→ Tallinna Kalev (loan)	12	(0)
2018	→ Tallinna Kalev U21 (loan)	1	(0)
2019–2021	Kuressaare	15	(0)
2020	→ Flora (loan)	10	(0)
2021–2025	Flora	97	(0)
2026–	Kuressaare	35	(0)

International career^{‡}
2017–2018	Estonia U21	8	(0)
2019	Estonia U23	1	(0)
2021–	Estonia	5	(0)
- * Club domestic league appearances and goals as of 17 November 2026 ‡ National team caps and goals as of 26 June 2023

Marco Lukka (born 4 December 1996) is an Estonian professional footballer who plays as a left-back for Meistriliiga club Kuressaare and the Estonia national team.

== International career ==
Lukka made his senior international debut for Estonia on 5 September 2021, in a 0–1 home loss to Northern Ireland.

== Honours ==
=== Club ===
Flora

- Meistriliiga: 2020, 2020
- Estonian Cup: 2019–20
