= Pavlo Fedorenko =

Ukrainian academic and mining engineer (1936–2026)

- Павло Федоренко
- Born: 8 October 1936; Kryvyi Rih, Dnipropetrovsk Oblast, Ukrainian SSR, Soviet Union
- Died: 24 March 2026 (aged 89); Kryvyi Rih, Dnipropetrovsk Oblast, Ukraine
- Education: Kryvyi Rih National University
- Occupations: Academic; mining engineer

Pavlo Yosypovych Fedorenko (Ukrainian: Павло Йосипович Федоренко; 8 October 1936 – 24 March 2026) was a Ukrainian academic and mining engineer. He was a recipient of the State Prize of Ukraine in Science and Technology (1997).

Fedorenko died in Kryvyi Rih on 24 March 2026, at the age of 89.
