= Pavel Dõmov =

Estonian footballer

Personal information
- Full name: Pavel Dõmov
- Date of birth: 31 December 1993 (age 32)
- Place of birth: Tallinn, Estonia
- Height: 1.72 m (5 ft 8 in)
- Position: Midfielder

Team information
- Current team: FCI Levadia U19
- Number: 76

Youth career
- 2003: Spartak
- 2004–2011: Legion

Senior career*
Years	Team	Apps	(Gls)
2009	Štrommi	18	(2)
2010–2016	Legion	120	(20)
2011–2014	Legion II	15	(2)
2015–2016	→ Infonet (loan)	22	(1)
2015–2016	→ Infonet II (loan)	31	(3)
2017	FCI Tallinn	31	(5)
2018	FCI Levadia	4	(0)
2018	→ Paide (loan)	12	(0)
2019–2020	Flora	7	(1)
2020	→ Tallinna Kalev (loan)	14	(1)
2021-2023	TJK Legion	56	(9)
2023-2025	Kuressaare	76	(2)
2026-	FCI Levadia U21	8	(0)
2026-	FCI Levadia U19	10	(1)

International career^{‡}
2011–2012	Estonia U19	2	(0)
2016	Estonia U23	1	(1)
2016–	Estonia	2	(0)
- * Club domestic league appearances and goals as of 24 July 2026 ‡ National team caps and goals as of 23 March 2021

Pavel Dõmov (born 31 December 1993) is an Estonian professional footballer who plays as a midfielder for Estonian club FCI Levadia U19 and U21 teams.

== Club career ==
=== FC Flora ===
Dõmov joined FC Flora on 1 January 2019, after signing for the club on 14 December 2018 until the end of 2020.

== International career ==
Dõmov started his international youth career in 2011 with the under-19 team. He made his international debut for Estonia on 19 November 2016, in a 1–1 away draw against Saint Kitts and Nevis in a friendly.

== Honours ==
Infonet

- Meistriliiga: 2016
- Estonian Cup: 2016–17
- Estonian Supercup: 2017

Flora

- Meistriliiga: 2019
