= Aleksandr Dmitrijev =

Estonian footballer and coach

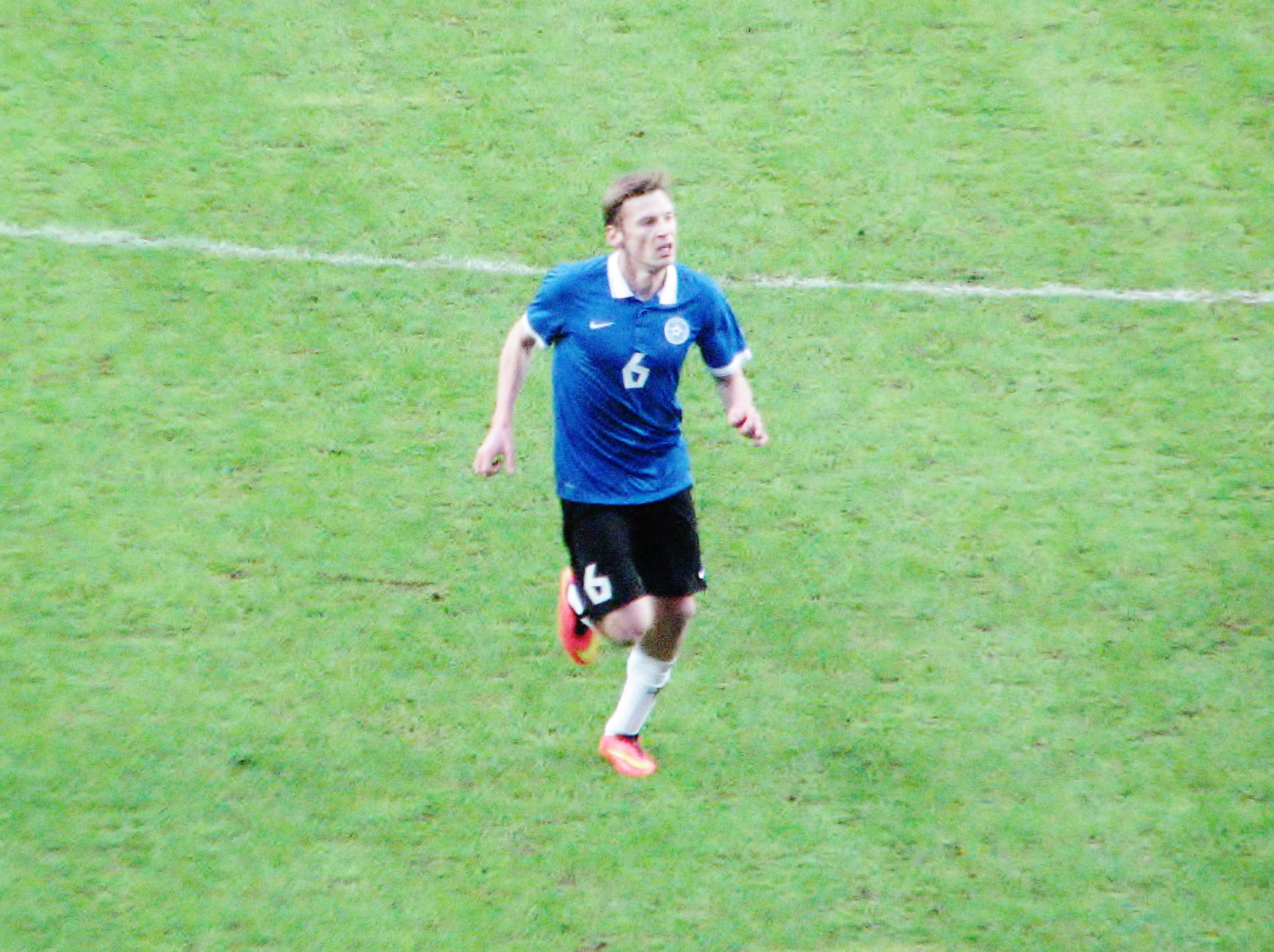
- Dmitrijev with Estonia in 2015

Personal information
- Full name: Aleksandr Dmitrijev
- Date of birth: 18 February 1982 (age 44)
- Place of birth: Tallinn, then part of Estonian SSR, Soviet Union
- Height: 1.77 m (5 ft 9 1/2 in)
- Position: Midfielder

Team information
- Current team: Tallinna Cosmos

Youth career
- TJK

Senior career*
Years	Team	Apps	(Gls)
1998–2000	TJK	41	(5)
1999–2000	TVMK	15	(0)
2001	HÜJK Emmaste	14	(3)
2001–2005	Levadia II	30	(3)
2003	M.C. Tallinn	3	(0)
2003–2008	Levadia	107	(7)
2008	→ Hønefoss (loan)	14	(2)
2010	Hønefoss 2	1	(0)
2008–2010	Hønefoss	62	(4)
2011–2012	Ural Yekaterinburg	16	(0)
2012	Neman Grodno	9	(0)
2012	Gomel	5	(0)
2014	Levadia II	1	(0)
2013–2014	Levadia	34	(1)
2015–2017	FCI Tallinn	85	(1)
2017	→ Hønefoss (loan)	10	(0)
2018	Flora	25	(0)
2019	Retro	12	(2)
2020–2021	Legion	38	(1)
2022–	Tallinna Cosmos	11	(2)

International career
2003	Estonia U21	7	(0)
2004–2018	Estonia	106	(0)

Managerial career
- 2019–2020: Tallinna Kalev
- * Club domestic league appearances and goals as of 31 December 2022

Aleksandr Dmitrijev (born 18 February 1982) is an Estonian football coach and former professional footballer, currently playing in amateur level as a midfielder for Tallinna Cosmos.

Internationally, Dmitrijev made 106 appearances for the Estonia national team.

== Club career ==
=== TJK ===
Dmitrijev came through the youth system at TJK and made his senior league debut in 1998.

=== TVMK ===
In 1999, Dmitrijev joined TVMK. He made his debut in the Meistriliiga on 30 June 1999, against Levadia.

=== Levadia ===
In 2001, Dmitrijev joined Levadia. He won his first Meistriliiga title in the 2004 season, and two more in 2006 and 2007. In March 2008, Dmitrijev was dropped from the squad and put on the transfer list after refusing to sign a contract extension.

=== Hønefoss ===
On 31 March 2008, Dmitrijev joined Norwegian club Hønefoss on loan until 31 July, with the option to make the move permanent. On 30 July, he signed for Hønefoss on a permanent deal. Hønefoss finished the 2009 Adeccoligaen as runners up and were promoted to the Tippeligaen.

=== Ural Yekaterinburg ===
On 7 February 2011, Dmitrijev signed a two-and-a-half-year contract with Russian Football National League club Ural Yekaterinburg.

=== Neman Grodno ===
In March 2012, Dmitrijev signed for Belarusian Premier League club Neman Grodno. He made his debut in the Belarusian Premier League on 31 March 2012, in 0–1 home loss to Minsk.

=== Gomel ===
On 10 August 2012, Dmitrijev signed a half-year contract with Belarusian Premier League club Gomel.

=== Return to Levadia ===
On 1 March 2013, Dmitrijev returned to his former club Levadia. He won two consecutive Meistriliiga titles in 2013 and 2014.

=== Infonet ===
On 26 February 2015, Dmitrijev signed a two-year contract with Meistriliiga club Infonet. He won his sixth Meistriliiga title in the 2016 season. On 6 December 2016, Dmitrijev signed a new contract that would extend his stay by two years to 2018.

==== Hønefoss (loan) ====
On 28 July 2017, Dmitrijev joined his former club Hønefoss on loan for the remainder of the season.

=== Flora ===
On 2 January 2018, Dmitrijev signed a one-year contract with Meistriliiga club Flora. He retired from football after the 2018 season.

== International career ==
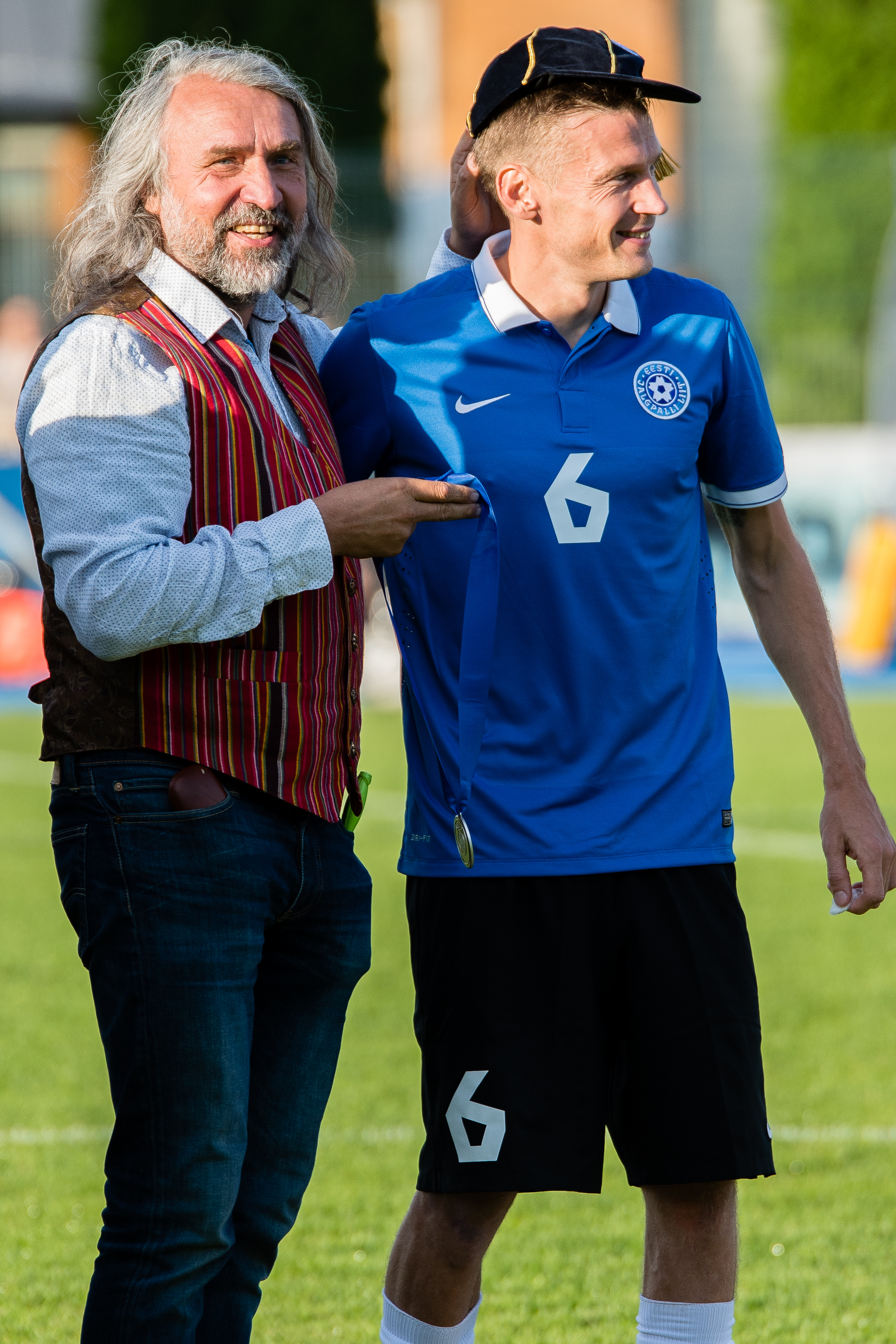
Dmitrijev with Aivar Pohlak before his 100th cap for Estonia on 31 August 2016.

Dmitrijev made his senior international debut for Estonia on 18 February 2004, his 22nd birthday, in a friendly against Moldova. Estonia won 1–0. He soon became a defensive stalwart of the national team. Dmitrijev made his 100th appearance for Estonia on 31 August 2016, in a 1–1 home draw against Malta in a friendly.

== Managerial career ==
On 28 December 2018, Tallinna Kalev announced that Dmitrijev would join the club as manager in January 2019.

== Honours ==
=== Club ===
Levadia II

- Estonian Cup: 2001–02

Levadia

- Meistriliiga: 2004, 2006, 2007, 2013, 2014
- Estonian Cup: 2003–04, 2004–05, 2006–07, 2013–14

FCI Tallinn

- Meistriliiga: 2016
- Estonian Cup: 2016–17
- Estonian Supercup: 2017

== See also ==
- List of men's footballers with 100 or more international caps
