= Leonhard Kass =

Estonian footballer (1911–1985)

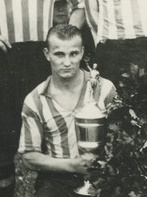
- Kass in 1932

Personal information
- Full name: Leonhard Heinrich Kass
- Date of birth: 22 October 1911
- Place of birth: Tallinn, Governorate of Estonia, Russian Empire
- Date of death: 23 November 1985 (aged 74)
- Place of death: Tallinn, then part of Estonian SSR, Soviet Union
- Height: 1.74 m (5 ft 8 1/2 in)
- Position: Winger

Youth career
- 1927–: Hõimla

Senior career*
Years	Team	Apps	(Gls)
1931–1934	Sport		
1936	Tallinna Puhkekodu		
1939–1940	Estonia		
1943	Sport		
1945–1951	Dünamo		
Total		?	(36)

International career
1931–1940	Estonia	40	(8)
- * Club domestic league appearances and goals

Leonhard Heinrich Kass (22 October 1911 – 23 November 1985) was an Estonian football player who played as a left winger. He won the Estonian Championship eight times and the Estonian Cup twice.

Internationally, Kass made 40 appearances for the Estonia national football team since his debut in 1931, and scored 8 goals. He won the 1931 and the 1938 Baltic Cup with the team.

== Honours ==
=== Club ===
Sport

- Estonian Championship: 1931, 1932, 1933

Estonia

- Estonian Championship: 1938–39

Dünamo

- Estonian Championship: 1945, 1947, 1949, 1950
- Estonian Cup: 1946, 1947

=== Country ===
Estonia

- Baltic Cup: 1931, 1938
