= 1947 in Soviet football =

Football in the Soviet Union
- Season: 1947

Men's football
- 1st Group: CDKA Moscow
- 2nd Group: Lokomotiv Moscow
- Soviet Cup: Spartak Moscow

The 1947 Soviet football championship was the 15th seasons of competitive football in the Soviet Union and the 9th among teams of sports societies and factories. CDKA Moscow again won the championship becoming the Soviet domestic champions for the second time.

The defending champions CDKA allowed their Moscow rivals Dinamo to take a lead early in a season but managed to catch. The fate of title was decided in the last round, after which CDKA won the season title based on a goal ratio.

== Honours ==
Competition	Winner	Runner-up
1st Group	CDKA Moscow (2)	Dinamo Moscow
2nd Group	Lokomotiv Moscow	Torpedo Gorkiy
Soviet Cup	Spartak Moscow (4*)	Torpedo Moscow

Notes = Number in parentheses is the times that club has won that honour. * indicates new record for competition

== Soviet Union football championship ==
=== First Group ===
Pos	Team	Pld	W	D	L	GF	GA	GD	Pts
1	CDKA Moscow	24	17	6	1	61	16	+45	40
2	Dynamo Moscow	24	19	2	3	57	15	+42	40
3	Dynamo Tbilisi	24	14	5	5	57	30	+27	33
4	Dynamo Kiev	24	9	9	6	27	31	−4	27
5	Torpedo Moscow	24	9	6	9	36	29	+7	24
6	Zenit Leningrad	24	10	2	12	35	49	−14	22
7	Krylia Sovetov Kuybyshev	24	8	6	10	32	45	−13	22
8	Spartak Moscow	24	6	9	9	34	26	+8	21
9	Traktor Stalingrad	24	7	7	10	34	39	−5	21
10	Dynamo Leningrad	24	7	5	12	32	48	−16	19
11	Krylia Sovetov Moscow	24	6	6	12	22	37	−15	18
12	Dynamo Minsk	24	5	4	15	17	46	−29	14
13	VVS Moscow	24	3	5	16	21	54	−33	11

Source: rsssf.com

=== Second Group ===
==== Subgroup Center ====
Pos	Team	Pld	W	D	L	GF	GA	GD	Pts
1	Lokomotiv Moscow	28	21	3	4	56	22	+34	45
2	MVO Moscow	28	21	2	5	58	20	+38	44
3	Dynamo Riga	28	16	6	6	70	38	+32	38
4	VMS Moscow	28	15	5	8	46	36	+10	35
5	Trudovye Rezervy Moscow	28	13	5	10	61	46	+15	31
6	Burevestnik Moscow	28	13	5	10	52	45	+7	31
7	DO Leningrad	28	10	10	8	26	27	−1	30
8	Dynamo Vilnius	28	13	2	13	55	47	+8	28
9	Metro Moscow	28	9	9	10	32	41	−9	27
10	Spartak Leningrad	28	9	7	12	35	38	−3	25
11	Kalev Tallinn	28	7	9	12	30	57	−27	23
12	Pishchevik Moscow	28	8	6	14	37	45	−8	22
13	Dzerzhynets Leningrad	28	8	2	18	34	50	−16	18
14	Sudostroitel Leningrad	28	5	8	15	24	53	−29	18
15	DO Minsk	28	1	3	24	15	66	−51	5

Source: rsssf.com

==== Subgroup Russia West ====
Pos	Team	Pld	W	D	L	GF	GA	GD	Pts
1	Torpedo Gorky	22	15	7	0	58	20	+38	37
2	Dynamo Saratov	22	12	4	6	54	41	+13	28
3	Zenit Izhevsk	22	11	3	8	53	43	+10	25
4	Kirkizh Plant Kovrov	22	10	5	7	45	39	+6	25
5	Torpedo Ulyanovsk	22	10	5	7	32	30	+2	25
6	Krasnoye Znamia Ivanovo	22	9	4	9	54	34	+20	22
7	Dynamo Kazan	22	8	3	11	34	30	+4	19
8	Khimik Dzerzhynsk	22	8	3	11	30	53	−23	19
9	Kalinin Plant Kaliningrad	22	7	4	11	38	45	−7	18
10	Torpedo Yaroslavl	22	5	7	10	24	37	−13	17
11	Traktor Kuibyshev	22	5	7	10	26	50	−24	17
12	Krylia Sovetov Ufa	22	4	4	14	34	60	−26	12

Source: rsssf.com

==== Subgroup Russia East ====
Pos	Team	Pld	W	D	L	GF	GA	GD	Pts
1	Dzerzhynets Chelyabinsk	36	20	13	3	91	31	+60	53
2	ODO Novosibirsk	36	22	6	8	88	36	+52	50
3	Krylia Sovetov Molotov	36	20	7	9	78	50	+28	47
4	Dynamo Chelyabinsk	36	20	5	11	78	52	+26	45
5	ODO Sverdlovsk	36	17	10	9	77	40	+37	44
6	Dzerzhynets Nizhniy Tagil	36	19	5	12	70	59	+11	43
7	Dynamo Sverdlovsk	36	15	10	11	44	44	0	40
8	Krylia Sovetov Omsk	36	14	10	12	63	50	+13	38
9	Avangard Sverdlovsk	36	14	9	13	50	53	−3	37
10	Krylia Sovetov Novosibirsk	36	13	10	13	57	60	−3	36

Source: rsssf.com

==== Subgroup Ukraine ====
Pos	Team	Pld	W	D	L	GF	GA	GD	Pts
1	Lokomotiv Kharkov (Q)	36	20	13	3	91	31	+60	53
2	Shakhtyor Stalino	36	22	6	8	88	36	+52	50
3	Pishchevik Odessa	36	20	7	9	78	50	+28	47
4	Stal Dnepropetrovsk	36	20	5	11	78	52	+26	45
5	ODO Kiev	36	17	10	9	77	40	+37	44
6	Spartak Lvov	36	19	5	12	70	59	+11	43
7	Spartak Kherson	36	15	10	11	44	44	0	40
8	Spartak Uzhgorod	36	14	10	12	63	50	+13	38
9	Dzerzhynets Kharkov	36	14	9	13	50	53	−3	37
10	Sudostroitel Nikolayev	36	13	10	13	57	60	−3	36
11	Dynamo Voroshilovgrad	36	13	7	16	49	63	−14	33
12	Bolshevik Zaporozhie (R)	36	12	8	16	37	45	−8	32
13	Dynamo Kishenev	36	10	11	15	39	53	−14	31

Source: rsssf.com
(Q) Qualified for finals; (R) Relegated

==== Subgroup Caucasus ====
Pos	Team	Pld	W	D	L	GF	GA	GD	Pts
1	ODO Tbilisi	36	20	13	3	91	31	+60	53
2	Dynamo Yerevan	36	22	6	8	88	36	+52	50
3	Lokomotiv Tbilisi	36	20	7	9	78	50	+28	47
4	Neftyanik Baku	36	20	5	11	78	52	+26	45
5	Krylia Sovetov Tbilisi	36	17	10	9	77	40	+37	44
6	Dynamo Rostov-on-Don	36	19	5	12	70	59	+11	43
7	Dynamo Baku	36	15	10	11	44	44	0	40
8	Spartak Yerevan	36	14	10	12	63	50	+13	38

Source: rsssf.com

==== Central Asia ====
Pos	Team	Pld	W	D	L	GF	GA	GD	Pts
1	Dynamo Stalinabad	36	20	13	3	91	31	+60	53
2	Dynamo Alma-Ata	36	22	6	8	88	36	+52	50
3	Dynamo Tashkent	36	20	7	9	78	50	+28	47
4	Lokomotiv Ashkhabad	36	20	5	11	78	52	+26	45
5	Dynamo Frunze	36	17	10	9	77	40	+37	44
6	ODO Tashkent	36	19	5	12	70	59	+11	43
7	Spartak Alma-Ata	36	15	10	11	44	44	0	40
8	Zenit Frunze	36	14	10	12	63	50	+13	38
9	Spartak Tashkent	36	14	9	13	50	53	−3	37

Source: rsssf.com

==== Tier final ====
Pos	Team	Pld	W	D	L	GF	GA	GD	Pts
1	Lokomotiv Moscow	5	4	1	0	11	4	+7	9
2	Torpedo Gorky	5	2	3	0	6	3	+3	7
3	Lokomotiv Kharkov	5	3	1	1	7	4	+3	7
4	Dzerzhynets Chelyabinsk	5	1	1	3	8	10	−2	3
5	Dynamo Stalinabad	5	1	1	3	5	11	−6	3
6	ODO Tbilisi	5	0	1	4	3	8	−5	1

Source: rsssf.com

=== Top goalscorers ===
1st Group

- Vsevolod Bobrov (CDKA Moscow), Valentin Nikolaev (CDKA Moscow), Sergei Solovyev (Dinamo Moscow) – 14 goals

2nd Group

- Andrei Zazroyev (Krylia Sovetov Molotov) – 12 goals

== Republican level ==
Football competitions of union republics

=== Football championships ===
- Azerbaijan SSR – Trudovye Rezervy Baku
- Armenian SSR – Dinamo Yerevan
- Belarusian SSR – Torpedo Minsk (see Football Championship of the Belarusian SSR)
- Estonian SSR – Dinamo Tallinn
- Georgian SSR – Dinamo Sukhumi
- Kazakh SSR – Lokomotiv Dzhambul
- Karelo-Finish SSR – unknown
- Kirgiz SSR – none
- Latvian SSR – Daugava Liepaja
- Lithuanian SSR – Lokomotiv Kaunas
- Moldavian SSR – Spartak Tiraspol
- Russian SFSR – none
- Tajik SSR – none
- Turkmen SSR – Spartak Ashkhabad
- Uzbek SSR – none
- Ukrainian SSR – Bilshovyk Mukachevo (see Football Championship of the Ukrainian SSR)

=== Football cups ===
- Azerbaijan SSR – Pischevik Baku
- Armenian SSR – Dinamo Yerevan
- Belarusian SSR – Torpedo Minsk
- Estonian SSR – Dinamo Tallinn
- Georgian SSR – Dinamo Batumi
- Kazakh SSR – none
- Karelo-Finish SSR – unknown
- Kirgiz SSR – Burevestnik Frunze
- Latvian SSR – Daugava Liepaja
- Lithuanian SSR – Lokomotiv Kaunas
- Moldavian SSR – Dinamo Kishinev
- Russian SFSR – Dinamo Khabarovsk
- Tajik SSR – ODO Stalinabad
- Turkmen SSR – Dinamo Ashkhabad
- Uzbek SSR – Pischevik Tashkent
- Ukrainian SSR – FC Dynamo Kyiv (see 1947 Cup of the Ukrainian SSR)
