= 1946 in Soviet football =

Football in the Soviet Union
- Season: 1946

Men's football
- 1st Group: CDKA Moscow
- 2nd Group: VVS Moscow
- Soviet Cup: Spartak Moscow

The 1946 Soviet football championship was the 14th seasons of competitive football in the Soviet Union and the 8th among teams of sports societies and factories. Among the worst teams of the top tier before World War II, CDKA Moscow won the championship becoming the Soviet domestic champions for the first time.

The defending champions Dinamo once again had a slow start in the first half and were not able to regain their champion pace in the second half as well, almost placing third behind clubmates from Tbilisi.

In 1946 there was reintroduced the third tier for a season, status of which is not determined and data for which is sparse.

== Honours ==
Competition	Winner	Runner-up
1st Group	CDKA Moscow (1)	Dinamo Moscow
2nd Group	VVS Moscow	Pischevik Moscow
Soviet Cup	Spartak Moscow (3*)	Dinamo Tbilisi

Notes = Number in parentheses is the times that club has won that honour. * indicates new record for competition

== Soviet Union football championship ==
=== First Group ===
Pos	Team	Pld	W	D	L	GF	GA	GD	Pts
1	CDKA Moscow	22	17	3	2	55	13	+42	37
2	Dynamo Moscow	22	16	1	5	68	17	+51	33
3	Dynamo Tbilisi	22	15	3	4	47	26	+21	33
4	Torpedo Moscow	22	11	5	6	44	29	+15	27
5	Dynamo Leningrad	22	10	4	8	37	35	+2	24
6	Spartak Moscow	19	8	5	6	38	40	−2	21
7	Krylia Sovetov Moscow	22	5	8	9	14	24	−10	18
8	Traktor Stalingrad	22	6	4	12	22	40	−18	16
9	Zenit Leningrad	22	5	5	12	22	45	−23	15
10	Krylia Sovetov Kuybyshev	22	3	8	11	16	52	−36	14
11	Dynamo Minsk	22	3	7	12	22	43	−21	13
12	Dynamo Kiev	22	4	5	13	18	39	−21	13

Source: rsssf.com

=== Second Group ===
==== Subgroup South ====
Pos	Republic	Team	Pld	W	D	L	GF	GA	GD	Pts
1	Russian SFSR	VVS Moscow	42	25	12	5	68	31	+37	62
2	Georgian SSR	DO Tbilisi	42	23	13	6	59	26	+33	58 (Note: 1 point deducted?)
3	Ukrainian SSR	FC Lokomotiv Kharkov	42	19	15	8	65	35	+30	50 (Note: 3 points deducted?)
4	Ukrainian SSR	FC Pishchevik Odessa	42	19	8	15	55	45	+10	46
5	Ukrainian SSR	FC Shakhtyor Stalino	42	17	12	13	62	46	+16	46
6	Georgian SSR	FC Lokomotiv Tbilisi	42	16	14	12	46	36	+10	44 (Note: 2 points deducted?)
7	Russian SFSR	FC Trudovye Rezervy Moscow	42	16	12	14	47	44	+3	44
8	Russian SFSR	FC Lokomotiv Moscow	42	15	9	18	45	54	−9	39
9	Azerbaijan SSR	FC Neftyanik Baku	42	15	10	17	58	63	−5	40
10	Armenian SSR	FC Dinamo Yerevan	42	14	12	16	54	53	+1	40
11	Russian SFSR	FC Dynamo Rostov-on-Donu	42	14	13	15	49	55	−6	40 (Note: 1 point deducted?)
12	Ukrainian SSR	FC Stal Dnepropetrovsk	42	16	7	19	40	56	−16	39
13	Ukrainian SSR	FC Sudostroitel Nikolayev	42	15	8	19	55	59	−4	38

==== Subgroup East ====
All Russia Russian SFSR

Pos	Team	Pld	W	D	L	GF	GA	GD	Pts
1	FC Pishchevik Moscow	42	25	12	5	68	31	+37	62
2	FC Torpedo Gorky	42	23	13	6	59	26	+33	58 (Note: 1 point deducted?)
3	MVO Moscow	42	19	15	8	65	35	+30	50 (Note: 3 points deducted?)
4	FC Spartak Leningrad	42	19	8	15	55	45	+10	46
5	DO Novosibirsk	42	17	12	13	62	46	+16	46
6	VMS Moscow	42	16	14	12	46	36	+10	44 (Note: 2 points deducted?)
7	FC Burevestnik Moscow	42	16	12	14	47	44	+3	44
8	FC Dynamo Ivanovo	42	15	9	18	45	54	−9	39
9	FC Krylya Sovetov Molotov	42	15	10	17	58	63	−5	40
10	FC Dzerzhinets Chelyabinsk	42	14	12	16	54	53	+1	40
11	FC Elektrosila Leningrad	42	14	13	15	49	55	−6	40 (Note: 1 point deducted?)
12	DO Sverdlovsk	42	16	7	19	40	56	−16	39
13	FC Pishchevik Leningrad	42	15	8	19	55	59	−4	38

==== Tier final ====
[Sep 18, 22] 

VVS Moskva   3-2 1-0 Pishchevik Moskva 

=== Top goalscorers ===
1st Group

- Aleksandr Ponomarev (Torpedo Moscow) – 18 goals

2nd Group

- Aleksandr Surianinov (Torpedo Gorkiy) – 14 goals

== Republican level ==
The top level of republican football competitions was proclaimed as the "Third Group" (Tretia Gruppa). There were two separate winners one from the Russian SFSR and the other from the union republics.

The competition was organized in eight Russian SFSR groups, four Ukrainian SSR groups, Belarusian SSR tournament, Transcaucasian tournament, and Central Asian tournament. The football competition in the "Third Group" involved participation of some 118 football teams.

=== Third Group (Russian SFSR) ===
==== West ====
- Dinamo Riga (1945 Latvian Champions)
- Kirovskiy Zavod Leningrad
- DO Leningrad
- Spartak Kaunas (1945 Lithuanian Champions)
- Dinamo Tallinn (1945 Estonian Champions)
- Stroitel Moscow
- Energiya Moscow
- Aeroflot Moscow
- DO Petrozavodsk

==== Center ====
- Zenit Kaliningrad
- Zenit Kovrov
- Spartak Podolsk
- Traktor Liubetsy
- Zenit Tula
- Krasnoye Znamia Orekhovo-Zuyevo
- Dinamo Yaroslavl
- Spartak Kursk
- Dinamo Oryol
- Dinamo Voronezh

==== Lower Volga ====
- Dinamo Saratov
- ODO Kuybyshev
- Pischevik Astrakhan
- Lokomotiv Kuybyshev
- Dinamo Stalingrad
- ZiV Kuybyshev
- Traktor Penza

==== Volga ====
- Krylia Sovetov Gorkiy
- Zenit Izhevsk
- Krasnaya Etna Gorkiy
- Azot Dzerzhinsk
- Spartak Ivanovo
- Dinamo Gorkiy
- Dinamo Kazan
- DO Gorkiy

==== Ural ====
- Dinamo Sverdlovsk
- Dinamo Cheliabinsk
- Dinamo Molotov
- Dzerzhinets Nizhniy Tagil
- Lokomotiv Tyumen
- Metallurg Vostoka Pervouralsk
- Tsvetmet Kamensk-Uralsky
- Metallurg Vostoka Lysva

==== Sibir ====
- Krylia Sovetov Novosibirsk
- Krylia Sovetov Omsk
- Traktor Barnaul
- Dinamo Novosibirsk
- Metallurg Vostoka Stalinsk-Kuznetsk
- Traktor Novosibirsk
- Ugolschik Prokopyevsk
- Azot Kemerovo

==== Northern Caucasus ====
- Dinamo Krasnodar
- Dinamo Stavropol
- Traktor Taganrog
- SKA Rostov-na-Donu
- Dinamo Nalchik
- Dinamo Groznyi
- Dinamo Makhachkala
- Dinamo Dzaudzhikau

==== Far East ====
- Dinamo Khabarovsk
- Dinamo Komsomolsk-na-Amure
- DOF Vladivostok
- DKA Khabarovsk
- Dinamo Chita
- Lokomotiv Irkutsk

==== Play-offs for the Final group ====
- Dinamo Saratov v Dinamo Krasnodar 2–0
- Krylia Sovetov Gorkiy v Dinamo Sverdlovsk 1–1, 1–3
- Krylia Sovetov Novosibirsk v Dinamo Khabarovsk 2–1

==== Final ====
- Dinamo Riga
- Zenit Kaliningrad
- Dinamo Sverdlovsk
- Dinamo Saratov
- Krylia Sovetov Novosibirsk

=== Third Group (Union republics) ===
==== Ukraine ====
- Spartak Uzhgorod
- DO Kiev
- Dzerzhinets Kharkiv
- Bolshevik Zaporozhye

==== Belarus ====
- DO Minsk
- Spartak Bobruisk
- Lokomotiv Grodno
- Dinamo-2 Minsk
- Lokomotiv Gomel
- DO Baranovichi
- Lokomotiv Brest

==== Caucasus ====
- Krylia Sovetov Tbilisi
- Dinamo Sukhumi
- Dinamo Batumi
- Dinamo Kutaisi
- Dinamo Baku
- Spartak Yerevan
- Dinamo Leninakan

==== Central Asia ====
- Dinamo Alma-Ata
- DO Tashkent
- Lokomotiv Ashkhabad
- Dinamo Stalinabad
- Dinamo Frunze

==== Final ====
- Spartak Uzhgorod
- Krylia Sovetov Tbilisi
- Dinamo Alma-Ata
- DO Minsk
- DO Kiev

=== Republican championships and cups ===
Football competitions of union republics

=== Football championships ===
- Azerbaijan SSR – Lokomotiv Baku
- Armenian SSR – Dinamo Yerevan
- Belarusian SSR – ODO Minsk (see Football Championship of the Belarusian SSR)
- Estonian SSR – Baltflot Tallinn (see 1946 Estonian SSR Football Championship)
- Georgian SSR – Dinamo Kutaisi
- Kazakh SSR – Dinamo Alma-Ata
- Karelo-Finish SSR – unknown
- Kirgiz SSR – none
- Latvian SSR – Daugava Liepaja
- Lithuanian SSR – Dinamo Kaunas
- Moldavian SSR – Dinamo Kishinev
- Russian SFSR – unknown
- Tajik SSR – none
- Turkmen SSR – Dinamo Ashkhabad
- Uzbek SSR – none
- Ukrainian SSR – Spartak Uzhhorod (see Football Championship of the Ukrainian SSR)

=== Football cups ===
- Azerbaijan SSR – none
- Armenian SSR – Dinamo Yerevan
- Belarusian SSR – ODO Minsk
- Estonian SSR – Dinamo Tallinn
- Georgian SSR – Burevestnik Tbilisi
- Kazakh SSR – none
- Karelo-Finish SSR – unknown
- Kirgiz SSR – none
- Latvian SSR – Daugava Liepaja
- Lithuanian SSR – none
- Moldavian SSR – Dinamo Kishinev
- Russian SFSR – Dinamo Sverdlovsk
- Tajik SSR – Dinamo Stalinabad
- Turkmen SSR – Dinamo Ashkhabad
- Uzbek SSR – DO Tashkent
- Ukrainian SSR – FC Dynamo Kyiv (see 1946 Cup of the Ukrainian SSR)
