= 1948 in Soviet football =

Football in the Soviet Union
- Season: 1948

Men's football
- 1st Group: CDKA Moscow
- 2nd Group: Lokomotiv Kharkov
- Soviet Cup: CDKA Moscow

The 1948 Soviet football championship was the 16th seasons of competitive football in the Soviet Union and the 10th among teams of sports societies and factories. CDKA Moscow won the championship becoming the Soviet domestic champions for the third time straight and the first to win a league title three years in the row.

The defending champions CDKA as in the previous season allowed their main rivals Dinamo to take lead early in the season and managed to catch up only at the end defeating them in the last game of the season 3–2 to preserve their title.

== Honours ==
Competition	Winner	Runner-up
1st Group	CDKA Moscow (3)	Dinamo Moscow
2nd Group	Lokomotiv Kharkov	Metallurg Moscow
Soviet Cup	CDKA Moscow (2)	Spartak Moscow

Notes = Number in parentheses is the times that club has won that honour. * indicates new record for competition

== Soviet Union football championship ==
=== First Group ===
Pos	Team	Pld	W	D	L	GF	GA	GD	Pts
1	CDKA Moscow	26	19	3	4	82	30	+52	41
2	Dynamo Moscow	26	18	4	4	85	28	+57	40
3	Spartak Moscow	26	18	1	7	64	34	+30	37
4	Dynamo Tbilisi	26	13	7	6	54	35	+19	33
5	Torpedo Moscow	26	15	3	8	58	43	+15	33
6	Dynamo Leningrad	26	10	5	11	42	47	−5	25
7	Lokomotiv Moscow	26	10	4	12	38	64	−26	24
8	Torpedo Stalingrad	26	7	7	12	28	44	−16	21
9	VVS Moscow	26	9	3	14	33	52	−19	21
10	Dynamo Kiev	26	7	6	13	32	50	−18	20
11	Krylia Sovetov Kuybyshev	26	5	9	12	22	40	−18	19
12	Dynamo Minsk	26	5	8	13	38	62	−24	18
13	Zenit Leningrad	26	4	9	13	29	48	−19	17
14	Krylia Sovetov Moscow	26	5	5	16	32	60	−28	15

Source: rsssf.com

=== Second Group ===
==== Subgroup Center ====
Pos	Team	Pld	W	D	L	GF	GA	GD	Pts
1	Metallurg Moscow	28	18	6	4	43	22	+21	42
2	Dynamo Riga	28	17	4	7	57	27	+30	38
3	MVO Moscow	28	16	6	6	52	28	+24	38
4	Spartak Vilnius	28	15	6	7	54	30	+24	36
5	Sudostroitel Leningrad	28	14	7	7	42	28	+14	35
6	Trudovye Rezervy Moscow	28	13	6	9	41	33	+8	32
7	Kalev Tallinn	28	10	8	10	34	34	0	28
8	Daugava Riga	28	10	7	11	31	45	−14	27
9	DO Leningrad	28	9	8	11	29	36	−7	26
10	Spartak Minsk	28	9	6	13	38	37	+1	24
11	VMS Moscow	28	9	5	14	44	59	−15	23
12	Metro Moscow	28	4	11	13	27	39	−12	19
13	DO Minsk	28	6	7	15	23	48	−25	19
14	Spartak Leningrad	28	5	8	15	25	46	−21	18
15	Dinamo Tallinn	28	4	7	17	23	51	−28	15

Source: rsssf.com

==== Subgroup Russia West ====
Pos	Team	Pld	W	D	L	GF	GA	GD	Pts
1	Dynamo Kazan	26	20	3	3	71	18	+53	43
2	Torpedo Gorky	26	18	3	5	81	31	+50	39
3	Krasnoye Znamia Ivanovo	26	18	3	5	64	31	+33	39
4	Khimik Dzerzhynsk	26	17	3	6	60	32	+28	37
5	Khimik Orekhovo-Zuyevo	26	14	7	5	58	26	+32	35
6	Dinamo Moscow Region	26	13	4	9	55	41	+14	30
7	Zenit Kaliningrad	26	9	9	8	45	39	+6	27
8	Zenit Kovrov	26	5	10	11	37	53	−16	20
9	Dzerzhinets Kolomna	26	7	4	15	37	49	−12	18
10	Zenit Izhevsk	26	7	4	15	35	60	−25	18
11	Dynamo Saratov	26	5	7	14	37	63	−26	17
12	Spartak Ivanovo	26	4	8	14	33	66	−33	16
13	Spartak Voronezh	26	4	5	17	19	70	−51	13
14	Spartak Penza	26	3	6	17	39	92	−53	12

Source: rsssf.com

==== Subgroup Russia East ====
Pos	Team	Pld	W	D	L	GF	GA	GD	Pts
1	Dzerzhynets Chelyabinsk	24	18	3	3	80	27	+53	39
2	ODO Novosibirsk	24	19	1	4	62	27	+35	39
3	ODO Sverdlovsk	24	12	6	6	56	25	+31	30
4	Krylia Sovetov Molotov	24	12	6	6	54	30	+24	30
5	Dynamo Sverdlovsk	24	11	5	8	51	44	+7	27
6	Dzerzhynets Nizhniy Tagil	24	11	5	8	32	32	0	27
7	Dynamo Chelyabinsk	24	9	6	9	39	39	0	24
8	Avangard Sverdlovsk	24	10	3	11	44	48	−4	23
9	Krylia Sovetov Omsk	24	8	5	11	44	39	+5	21
10	Khimmik Kemerovo	24	8	5	11	42	45	−3	21
11	Metallurg Magnitagorsk	24	7	1	16	34	66	−32	15
12	TsvetMet Kamensk-Uralskiy	24	4	2	18	33	91	−58	10
13	Gornyak Kemerovo	24	1	4	19	20	80	−60	6

Source: rsssf.com

==== Subgroup Ukraine A ====
Pos	Team	Pld	W	D	L	GF	GA	GD	Pts
1	Lokomotiv Kharkov (Q)	14	8	5	1	40	10	+30	21
2	Stal Dnepropetrovsk (Q)	14	9	2	3	34	24	+10	20
3	Shakhter Stalino (P)	14	8	3	3	33	15	+18	19
4	Dynamo Voroshylovgrad	14	4	6	4	30	29	+1	14
5	Lokomotiv Zaporozhie	14	4	3	7	22	30	−8	11
6	Avangard Kramatorsk	14	3	4	7	23	40	−17	10
7	Dzerzhynets Kharkov	14	4	1	9	16	37	−21	9
8	Shakhter Kadievka	14	3	2	9	16	29	−13	8

Source: rsssf.com
(P) Promoted; (Q) Qualified for finals

==== Subgroup Ukraine B ====
Pos	Team	Pld	W	D	L	GF	GA	GD	Pts
1	Bolshevik Mukachevo (Q)	14	10	2	2	35	16	+19	22
2	DO Kiev (Q)	14	9	4	1	27	14	+13	22
3	Spartak Lvov	14	6	5	3	26	22	+4	17
4	Spartak Uzhgorod	14	7	2	5	33	19	+14	16
5	Pishchevik Odessa	14	5	5	4	19	18	+1	15
6	Spartak Kherson	14	5	3	6	18	22	−4	13
7	Dynamo Kishenev	14	1	2	11	11	35	−24	4
8	Sudostroitel Nikolaev	14	0	3	11	8	31	−23	3

Source: rsssf.com
(Q) Qualified for finals

==== Subgroup Ukraine Final ====
Pos	Team	Pld	W	D	L	GF	GA	GD	Pts
1	Lokomotiv Kharkov (Q, P)	3	2	1	0	7	2	+5	5
2	Stal Dnepropetrovsk	3	2	1	0	5	2	+3	5
3	ODO Kiev	3	1	0	2	3	6	−3	2
4	Bolshevik Mukachevo	3	0	0	3	1	6	−5	0

Source: rsssf.com
(P) Promoted; (Q) Qualified for finals

===== 1st place play-off =====
Lokomotiv Kharkov v Stal Dnepropetrovsk 3–1

==== Subgroup South (Caucasus) ====
Pos	Team	Pld	W	D	L	GF	GA	GD	Pts
1	Dynamo Yerevan	18	13	4	1	48	12	+36	30
2	ODO Tbilisi	18	12	5	1	40	16	+24	29
3	Spartak Tbilisi	18	11	3	4	52	24	+28	25
4	Neftyanik Baku	18	8	5	5	27	19	+8	21
5	Lokomotiv Tbilisi	18	8	3	7	40	37	+3	19
6	Dynamo Rostov-on-Don	18	6	5	7	40	33	+7	17
7	Dynamo Baku	18	7	2	9	26	28	−2	16
8	Spartak Yerevan	18	3	5	10	21	35	−14	11
9	Traktor Taganrog	18	3	3	12	19	47	−28	9
10	Pishchevik Astrakhan	18	1	1	16	10	72	−62	3

Source: rsssf.com

==== Central Asia ====
Pos	Team	Pld	W	D	L	GF	GA	GD	Pts
1	ODO Tashkent	12	8	2	2	37	9	+28	18
2	Dynamo Alma-Ata	12	7	3	2	22	9	+13	17
3	Lokomotiv Ashkhabad	12	5	3	4	21	13	+8	13
4	Zenit Frunze	12	4	3	5	12	21	−9	11
5	Dynamo Tashkent	12	4	1	7	16	25	−9	9
6	Dynamo Stalinabad	12	3	3	6	13	21	−8	9
7	Spartak Alma-Ata	12	3	1	8	15	38	−23	7

Source: rsssf.com

==== Tier final ====
Pos	Team	Pld	W	D	L	GF	GA	GD	Pts
1	Lokomotiv Kharkov	5	3	1	1	11	3	+8	7
2	Metallurg Moscow	5	3	0	2	4	2	+2	6
3	Dinamo Yerevan	5	2	2	1	10	7	+3	6
4	Dzerzhynets Chelyabinsk	5	3	0	2	9	8	+1	6
5	Dinamo Kazan	5	1	2	2	4	6	−2	5 (Note: 1 bonus point?)
6	ODO Tashkent	5	0	1	4	7	19	−12	1

Source: rsssf.com

=== Top goalscorers ===
1st Group

- Sergei Solovyov (Dinamo Moscow) – 25 goals
