= 1948 Vtoraya Gruppa =

Vtoraya Gruppa
- Season: 1948
- Champions: Lokomotiv Kharkov
- Promoted: Lokomotiv Kharkov; Shakhter Stalino; Dinamo Yerevan; Daugava Riga; Neftianik Baku

The 1948 Vtoraya Gruppa of the Soviet football championship was the 9th season of the second tier football competitions in the Soviet Union.

The format of the competition was preserved from the previous season and included six groups, but number of participants was increased once again to total of 75. Group winners qualified to the final group, the winner of which was the ultimate winner and gained promotion to the Pervaya Gruppa (Top League).

Lokomotiv Kharkov won the championship. Five teams gained promotion to the 1949 Pervaya Gruppa.

== Teams ==
=== Relegated teams ===
- none

=== Promoted teams ===
- FC Metallurg Moscow – (returning, last played in 1936 as "Serp i Molot Moscow")
- FC Spartak Minsk – (returning, last played in 1939)
- FC Bolshevik Mukachevo – Champions of the 1947 Football Championship of the Ukrainian SSR (debut)
- FC Dinamo Tallinn – Champions of the 1947 Estonian SSR Football Championship (debut)
- FC Daugava Riga – (debut)
- FC Spartak Ivanovo – (debut)
- FC Spartak Penza – (debut)
- FC Khimik Kemerevo – (debut)
- FC Traktor Taganrog – (debut)
- FC Pischevik Astrakhan – (debut)
- FC Avanhard Kramatorsk – (debut)
- FC Shakhter Kadievka – (debut)
- FC Lokomotiv Zaporozhye
- FC Metallurg Magnitogorsk – (debut)
- FC Khimik Orekhovo-Zuyevo* – (debut)
- FC Dinamo Moscow Oblast* – (debut)
- FC Dzerzhinets Kolomna* – (debut)
- FC Spartak Voronezh* – (debut)
- FC Tsvetmet Kamensk-Uralskiy* – (debut)
- FC Gornyak Kemerevo* – (debut)
- With the asterisk identified teams that may have been created just before the start of the season.

=== Renamed teams ===
- Spartak Vilnius last season was known as Dinamo Vilnius

== Qualifying stage ==
=== Central Zone ===
Pos	Team	Pld	W	D	L	GF	GA	GD	Pts	Qualification
1	Metallurg Moscow	28	18	6	4	43	22	+21	42	
2	Dynamo Riga	28	17	4	7	57	27	+30	38	
3	MVO Moscow	28	16	6	6	52	28	+24	38	
4	Spartak Vilnius	28	15	6	7	54	30	+24	36	
5	Sudostroitel Leningrad	28	14	7	7	42	28	+14	35	
6	Trudovye Rezervy Moscow	28	13	6	9	41	33	+8	32	
7	Kalev Tallinn	28	10	8	10	34	34	0	28	
8	Daugava Riga	28	10	7	11	31	45	−14	27	
9	DO Leningrad	28	9	8	11	29	36	−7	26	
10	Spartak Minsk	28	9	6	13	38	37	+1	24	
11	VMS Moscow	28	9	5	14	44	59	−15	23	
12	Metro Moscow	28	4	11	13	27	39	−12	19	
13	DO Minsk	28	6	7	15	23	48	−25	19	
14	Spartak Leningrad	28	5	8	15	25	46	−21	18	Relegation
15	Dinamo Tallinn	28	4	7	17	23	51	−28	15	Relegation

Source: rsssf.com

=== Russian SFSR Zone 1 ===
Pos	Team	Pld	W	D	L	GF	GA	GD	Pts
1	Dynamo Kazan	26	20	3	3	71	18	+53	43
2	Torpedo Gorky	26	18	3	5	81	31	+50	39
3	Krasnoye Znamia Ivanovo	26	18	3	5	64	31	+33	39
4	Khimik Dzerzhynsk	26	17	3	6	60	32	+28	37
5	Khimik Orekhovo-Zuyevo	26	14	7	5	58	26	+32	35
6	Dinamo Moscow Region	26	13	4	9	55	41	+14	30
7	Zenit Kaliningrad	26	9	9	8	45	39	+6	27
8	Zenit Kovrov	26	5	10	11	37	53	−16	20
9	Dzerzhinets Kolomna	26	7	4	15	37	49	−12	18
10	Zenit Izhevsk	26	7	4	15	35	60	−25	18
11	Dynamo Saratov	26	5	7	14	37	63	−26	17
12	Spartak Ivanovo	26	4	8	14	33	66	−33	16
13	Spartak Voronezh	26	4	5	17	19	70	−51	13
14	Spartak Penza	26	3	6	17	39	92	−53	12

Source: rsssf.com

=== Russian SFSR Zone 2 ===
Pos	Team	Pld	W	D	L	GF	GA	GD	Pts
1	Dzerzhynets Chelyabinsk	24	18	3	3	80	27	+53	39
2	ODO Novosibirsk	24	19	1	4	62	27	+35	39
3	ODO Sverdlovsk	24	12	6	6	56	25	+31	30
4	Krylia Sovetov Molotov	24	12	6	6	54	30	+24	30
5	Dynamo Sverdlovsk	24	11	5	8	51	44	+7	27
6	Dzerzhynets Nizhniy Tagil	24	11	5	8	32	32	0	27
7	Dynamo Chelyabinsk	24	9	6	9	39	39	0	24
8	Avangard Sverdlovsk	24	10	3	11	44	48	−4	23
9	Krylia Sovetov Omsk	24	8	5	11	44	39	+5	21
10	Khimmik Kemerovo	24	8	5	11	42	45	−3	21
11	Metallurg Magnitagorsk	24	7	1	16	34	66	−32	15
12	TsvetMet Kamensk-Uralskiy	24	4	2	18	33	91	−58	10
13	Gornyak Kemerovo	24	1	4	19	20	80	−60	6

Source: rsssf.com

=== Ukrainian Zone ===
The zone was expanded from 13 to 16 teams split into two subgroups. The relegated Bolshevik Zaporozhie was replaced with the best three teams of Donbas group (Group 6) including Lokomotiv Zaporozhie and the champion of the 1947 Football Championship of the Ukrainian SSR.

FC Shakhter Stalino was promoted to the 1949 Pervaya Gruppa without the need to qualify for the league's finals.

==== Subgroup A ====
Pos	Team	Pld	W	D	L	GF	GA	GD	Pts
1	Lokomotiv Kharkov (Q)	14	8	5	1	40	10	+30	21
2	Stal Dnepropetrovsk (Q)	14	9	2	3	34	24	+10	20
3	Shakhter Stalino (P)	14	8	3	3	33	15	+18	19
4	Dynamo Voroshylovgrad	14	4	6	4	30	29	+1	14
5	Lokomotiv Zaporozhie	14	4	3	7	22	30	−8	11
6	Avanhard Kramatorsk	14	3	4	7	23	40	−17	10
7	Dzerzhynets Kharkov	14	4	1	9	16	37	−21	9
8	Shakhter Kadievka	14	3	2	9	16	29	−13	8

Source: rsssf.com
(P) Promoted; (Q) Qualified for finals

==== Subgroup B ====
Pos	Team	Pld	W	D	L	GF	GA	GD	Pts
1	Bolshevik Mukachevo (Q)	14	10	2	2	35	16	+19	22
2	DO Kiev (Q)	14	9	4	1	27	14	+13	22
3	Spartak Lvov	14	6	5	3	26	22	+4	17
4	Spartak Uzhgorod	14	7	2	5	33	19	+14	16
5	Pishchevik Odessa	14	5	5	4	19	18	+1	15
6	Spartak Kherson	14	5	3	6	18	22	−4	13
7	Dynamo Kishenev	14	1	2	11	11	35	−24	4
8	Sudostroitel Nikolaev	14	0	3	11	8	31	−23	3

Source: rsssf.com
(Q) Qualified for finals

==== Final ====
Pos	Team	Pld	W	D	L	GF	GA	GD	Pts
1	Lokomotiv Kharkov (Q, P)	3	2	1	0	7	2	+5	5
2	Stal Dnepropetrovsk	3	2	1	0	5	2	+3	5
3	ODO Kiev	3	1	0	2	3	6	−3	2
4	Bolshevik Mukachevo	3	0	0	3	1	6	−5	0

Source: rsssf.com
(P) Promoted; (Q) Qualified for finals

===== 1st place play-off =====
Lokomotiv Kharkov - Stal Dnepropetrovsk 3:1

=== Southern Zone ===
Pos	Team	Pld	W	D	L	GF	GA	GD	Pts
1	Dynamo Yerevan	18	13	4	1	48	12	+36	30
2	ODO Tbilisi	18	12	5	1	40	16	+24	29
3	Spartak Tbilisi	18	11	3	4	52	24	+28	25
4	Neftyanik Baku	18	8	5	5	27	19	+8	21
5	Lokomotiv Tbilisi	18	8	3	7	40	37	+3	19
6	Dynamo Rostov-on-Don	18	6	5	7	40	33	+7	17
7	Dynamo Baku	18	7	2	9	26	28	−2	16
8	Spartak Yerevan	18	3	5	10	21	35	−14	11
9	Traktor Taganrog	18	3	3	12	19	47	−28	9
10	Pishchevik Astrakhan	18	1	1	16	10	72	−62	3

Source: rsssf.com

=== Central-Asian Zone ===
Pos	Team	Pld	W	D	L	GF	GA	GD	Pts
1	ODO Tashkent	12	8	2	2	37	9	+28	18
2	Dynamo Alma-Ata	12	7	3	2	22	9	+13	17
3	Lokomotiv Ashkhabad	12	5	3	4	21	13	+8	13
4	Zenit Frunze	12	4	3	5	12	21	−9	11
5	Dynamo Tashkent	12	4	1	7	16	25	−9	9
6	Dynamo Stalinabad	12	3	3	6	13	21	−8	9
7	Spartak Alma-Ata	12	3	1	8	15	38	−23	7

Source: rsssf.com

== Final stage ==
Pos	Team	Pld	W	D	L	GF	GA	GD	Pts
1	Lokomotiv Kharkov (H, C)	5	3	1	1	11	3	+8	7
2	Metallurg Moscow	5	3	0	2	4	2	+2	6
3	Dinamo Yerevan	5	2	2	1	10	7	+3	6
4	Dzerzhynets Chelyabinsk	5	3	0	2	9	8	+1	6
5	Dinamo Kazan	5	1	2	2	4	6	−2	5 (Note: 1 bonus point?)
6	ODO Tashkent	5	0	1	4	7	19	−12	1

Source: rsssf.com
(C) Champions; (H) Hosts

== Number of teams by republics ==
Number	Union republics	Team(s)
38	Russian SFSR	FC Metallurg Moscow, MVO Moscow, FC Sudostroitel Leningrad, FC Trudovye Rezervy Moscow, DO Leningrad, VMS Moscow, FC Metro Moscow, FC Spartak Leningrad FC Dinamo Kazan, FC Torpedo Gorky, FC Krasnoye Znamya Ivanovo, FC Khimik Dzerzhinsk, FC Khimik Orekhovo-Zuevo, FC Dinamo Moscow Oblast, FC Zenit Kaliningrad, FC Zenit Kovrov, FC Dzerzhinets Kolomna, FC Zenit Izhevsk, FC Dinamo Saratov, FC Spartak Ivanovo, FC Spartak Voronezh, FC Spartak Penza, FC Dzerzhinets Chelyabinsk, ODO Novosibirsk, ODO Sverdlovsk, FC Krylia Sovetov Molotov, FC Dinamo Sverdlovsk, FC Dzerzhinets Nizhniy Tagil, FC Dinamo Chelyabinsk, FC Avangard Sverdlovsk, FC Krylia Sovetov Omsk, FC Khimik Kemerovo, FC Metallurg Magnitogorsk, FC Tsvetmet Kamensk-Uralskiy, FC Gornyak Kemerovo, FC Dinamo Rostov-na-Donu, FC Traktor Taganrog, FC Pischevik Astrakhan
15	Ukrainian SSR	FC Lokomotiv Kharkov, FC Stal Dnepropetrovsk, FC Shakhter Stalino, FC Dinamo Voroshilovgrad, FC Lokomotiv Zaporozhye, FC Avangard Kramatorsk, FC Dzerzhinets Kharkov, FC Shakhter Kadeevka, FC Bolshevik Mukachevo, DO Kiev, FC Spartak Lvov, FC Spartak Uzhgorod, FC Pischevik Odessa, FC Spartak Kherson, FC Sudostroitel Nikolaev
3	Georgian SSR	FC Spartak Tbilisi, FC Lokomotiv Tbilisi, ODO Tbilisi
2	Latvian SSR	FC Dinamo Riga, FC Daugava Riga
2	Belarusian SSR	FC Spartak Minsk, DO Minsk
2	Estonian SSR	FC Kalev Tallinn, FC Dinamo Tallinn
2	Azerbaijan SSR	FC Neftianik Baku, FC Dinamo Baku
2	Armenian SSR	FC Dinamo Yerevan, FC Spartak Yerevan
2	Uzbek SSR	ODO Tashkent, FC Dinamo Tashkent
2	Kazakh SSR	FC Dinamo Alma-Ata, FC Spartak Alma-Ata
1	Lithuanian SSR	FC Spartak Vilnius
1	Moldavian SSR	FC Dinamo Kishinev
1	Turkmen SSR	FC Lokomotiv Ashkhabat
1	Kyrgyz SSR	FC Zenit Frunze
1	Tajik SSR	FC Dinamo Stalinabad

== See also ==
- 1948 Soviet First Group
- 1948 Soviet Cup
