= 1990 Football Championship of the Belarusian SSR =

Football Championship of the Belarusian SSR – Pershaja Liha Belarusian: Першая ліга чэмпіянату БССР па футболе
- Season: 1990
- Champions: Sputnik Minsk (5th title)

The 1990 Football Championship of the Belarusian SSR (Belarusian: Чэмпіянат БССР па футболе) was the 54th regular annual competition in football of the Byelorussian Soviet Socialist Republic at all-republican level. In the competition took part 48 teams in two tiers.

== Overview ==
The championship consisted of three tiers: First (Pershaja), Second (Druhaja) leagues and Trade Union competitions. Six teams were participating in the All-Union competitions and represented all the regional centers of Belarusian SSR: Dynama Mensk, Dynama Brest, Dnepr Mahiljow, KIM Vitsebsk, Njoman Hrodna, Homselmash Homiel.

The First League was contested by 16 teams, and Sputnik Minsk won the championship.

== Pershaja Liha ==
=== Teams ===
Location of teams in 1990 First League (Pershaja Liha) of the BSSR

=== Final standings ===
Pos	Team	Pld	W	D	L	GF	GA	GD	Pts	Promotion or relegation
1	Sputnik Minsk (C)	30	22	5	3	80	17	+63	49	Republican champions
2	Shakhtsjor Salihorsk	30	20	7	3	58	14	+44	47	
3	Tarpeda Minsk	30	17	7	6	43	24	+19	41	
4	Metalurh Maladzechna	30	17	6	7	44	26	+18	40	
5	SelMash Mahiljow	30	12	11	7	33	25	+8	35	
6	Abutnik Lida	30	13	8	9	41	27	+14	34	
7	BelAZ Zhodzina	30	12	10	8	37	32	+5	34	
8	SKB Vitsebsk	30	14	2	14	49	39	+10	30	
9	Tarpeda Mahiljow	30	13	4	13	38	42	−4	30	
10	Arbita Minsk	30	10	7	13	35	46	−11	27	
11	Budawnik Staryja Darohi	30	9	8	13	41	45	−4	26	
12	KIM Vitsebsk	30	8	7	15	31	47	−16	23	
13	Dzvina Navapolatsk (R)	30	7	9	14	35	43	−8	23	Relegation to Trade Union competitions
14	SKIF-ShVSM Minsk	30	5	13	12	20	44	−24	23	
15	Mashynabudawnik Pinsk (R)	30	3	6	21	17	60	−43	12	Relegation to Druhaja Liha
16	Temp Orsha (R)	30	2	2	26	11	86	−75	6	Relegation to Druhaja Liha

Source: rsssf.com
(C) Champions; (R) Relegated

== Druhaja Liha ==
Football Championship of the Belarusian SSR – Druhaja Liha
- Season: 1990
- Champions: Group 1: Traktor Bobruisk; Group 2: Veras Grodno
- Promoted: Traktor, Veras

=== Subgroup 1 final standings ===
Pos	Team	Pld	W	D	L	GF	GA	GD	Pts	Promotion or relegation
1	Traktor Bobruisk (C, P)	30	23	6	1	78	9	+69	52	Promoted to Pershaja Liha
2	Berezina Borisov	30	23	4	3	52	22	+30	50	
3	Vedrich Rechitsa	30	21	6	3	58	13	+45	48	
4	ZLiN Gomel	30	17	5	8	44	26	+18	39	
5	Kolos Ustie	30	15	8	7	35	17	+18	38	
6	Belarus Maryina Gorka	30	14	7	9	57	43	+14	35	
7	Polesie Mozyr	30	12	9	9	36	28	+8	33	
8	Almaz Gomel	30	11	10	9	46	32	+14	32	Relegation/Withdrawal
9	Dnepr Mogilev	30	10	5	15	31	33	−2	25	
10	Khimik Svetlogorsk	30	10	5	15	33	47	−14	25	
11	Dnepr Rogachev	30	9	6	15	24	39	−15	24	
12	Tekhnolog Vitebsk	30	7	5	18	25	56	−31	19	Relegation/Withdrawal
13	Dnepr Bykhov	30	8	1	21	33	64	−31	17	
14	Kolos Kirovsk	30	6	5	19	31	59	−28	17	Relegation/Withdrawal
15	ZZS Vitebsk	30	6	2	22	23	80	−57	14	Relegation/Withdrawal
16	Sluch Slutsk	30	4	4	22	29	66	−37	12	Relegation/Withdrawal

Source: kick-off.by, footballfacts.ru
(C) Champions; (P) Promoted

=== Subgroup 2 final standings ===
Pos	Team	Pld	W	D	L	GF	GA	GD	Pts	Promotion or relegation
1	Veras Grodno	30	19	6	5	53	19	+34	44	Promoted to Pershaja Liha
2	Neman Mosty	30	16	7	7	35	23	+12	39	
3	Stankostroitel Smorgon	30	16	7	7	54	35	+19	39	
4	Kolos Dzerzhinsk	30	16	5	9	50	35	+15	37	
5	Lokomotiv Baranovichi	30	12	9	9	35	35	0	33	
6	Niva Samokhvalovichi	30	11	11	8	58	50	+8	33	
7	Burevestnik Brest	30	13	6	11	49	34	+15	32	
8	Khimik Kletsk	30	11	7	12	38	45	−7	29	
9	Traktor Minsk	30	11	6	13	45	41	+4	28	
10	Zaria Iazyl	30	9	10	11	32	42	−10	28	
11	Stroitel Bereza	30	9	9	12	32	41	−9	27	
12	MVIZRU-Smena Minsk	30	8	10	12	35	50	−15	26	
13	Luch Minsk	30	8	10	12	39	47	−8	26	
14	Metro Minsk	30	9	6	15	29	46	−17	24	
15	Fakel Oshmiany	30	9	6	15	35	63	−28	24	
16	KSOM Volkovysk	30	0	0	30	0	90	−90	0 (Note: The team of KSOM Volkovysk was withdrawn from competitions and other teams in all games against the Volkovysk team were awarded technical victories with a score 3:0)	Relegation/Withdrawal

Source: kick-off.by, footballfacts.ru
