= 1946 Football Championship of the Belarusian SSR =

Football Championship of the Belarusian SSR – Pershaja Liha Belarusian: Першая ліга чэмпіянату БССР па футболе
- Season: 1946
- Champions: ODO Minsk (4th title)

The 1946 Football Championship of the Belarusian SSR (Belarusian: Чэмпіянат БССР па футболе) was the 10th regular annual competition in football of the Byelorussian Soviet Socialist Republic at all-republican level. The competition was also considered as part of the so-called "Tretya Gruppa" of the Soviet Football Championship.

ODO Minsk won the tournament. Dinamo Minsk were the defending champions.

== Pershaja Liha ==
=== League table ===
Pos	Team	Pld	W	D	L	GF	GA	GD	Pts	Promotion or relegation
1	ODO Minsk	10	9	0	1	41	0	+41	18	Promoted to the 1947 Vtoraya Gruppa
2	Dinamo Minsk	10	5	3	2	17	13	+4	13	
3	Spartak Babruisk	10	4	1	5	14	24	−10	9	
4	Lokomotiv Homel	10	4	1	5	7	26	−19	9	
5	Lokomotiv Hrodna	10	3	1	6	16	20	−4	7	
6	Lokomotiv Brest	10	2	0	8	13	25	−12	4	

Source: rsssf.com
