= 1992 Belarusian Premier League =

Belarusian Premier League
- Season: 1992
- Champions: Dinamo Minsk (1st title)
- Relegated: none
- Matches: 120
- Goals: 277 (2.31 per match)
- Top goalscorer: (Belarus) Andrey Skorobogatko (11 goals)
- Biggest home win: Dinamo Minsk 8–1 BelAZ (9 May 1992)
- Biggest away win: Gomselmash 0–6 Dnepr (6 June 1992)
- Highest scoring: Dinamo Minsk 8–1 BelAZ (9 May 1992)

The 1992 Belarusian Premier League season was the inaugural tournament for independent Belarus after the dissolution of Soviet Union. A decision was made to switch the schedule of the league to fall-spring format, therefore the first season was played as a single round-robin tournament between 18 April and 20 June 1992.

== Teams and venues ==
Location of teams in 1992 Belarusian Premier League

The first teams to participate in the Belarusian top football league were Dinamo Minsk, a sole staple Belarusian team from Soviet Top League, four teams formerly of Soviet Second League (Dinamo Brest, Dnepr, KIM and Khimik), one team formerly of Soviet Second League B (Gomselmash) and ten teams formerly of the Football Championship of the Belarusian SSR.

Team	Location	Venue	Capacity	League and position in 1991	
Dinamo Minsk	Minsk	Dinamo Stadium (Minsk)	50,050	Soviet Top League	8
Dnepr Mogilev	Mogilev	Spartak Stadium (Mogilev)	12,000	Soviet Second League, West	12
Dinamo Brest	Brest	Dinamo Stadium (Brest)	10,500	Soviet Second League, West	16
KIM Vitebsk	Vitebsk	Dinamo Stadium (Vitebsk)	5,500	Soviet Second League, West	20
Khimik Grodno	Grodno	Krasnoye Znamya Stadium	14,000	Soviet Second League, West	22
Gomselmash Gomel	Gomel	Gomselmash Stadium	10,000	Soviet Second League B, Zone 6	16
Metallurg Molodechno	Molodechno	Metallurg Stadium	5,600	Belarusian SSR First League	1
Torpedo Mogilev	Mogilev	Torpedo Stadium (Mogilev)	4,000	Belarusian SSR First League	2
SKB-Lokomotiv Vitebsk	Vitebsk	Dinamo Stadium (Vitebsk)	5,500	Belarusian SSR First League	3
Torpedo Minsk	Minsk	Torpedo Stadium (Minsk)	5,000	Belarusian SSR First League	4
Shakhtyor Soligorsk	Soligorsk	Shakhtyor Stadium	5,000	Belarusian SSR First League	5
Stroitel Starye Dorogi	Starye Dorogi	Stroitel Stadium	5,000	Belarusian SSR First League	6
Traktor Bobruisk	Bobruisk	Spartak Stadium (Bobruisk)	3,500	Belarusian SSR First League	9
BelAZ Zhodino	Zhodino	Torpedo Stadium (Zhodino)	5,500	Belarusian SSR First League	10
Obuvshchik Lida	Lida	Obuvshchik Stadium	3,500	Belarusian SSR First League	11
Vedrich Rechitsa	Rechitsa	Rechitsadrev Stadium	4,000	Belarusian SSR Second League	1

1. One home game played at Traktor Stadium.
2. One home game played at Spartak Stadium.
3. SKB-Lokomotiv played all home games of the season at Lyos Stadium (capacity 3,000) in Baran due to scheduling conflicts with KIM.
4. Five home games played at Traktor Stadium.

== Table ==
Pos	Team	Pld	W	D	L	GF	GA	GD	Pts
1	Dinamo Minsk (C)	15	11	3	1	38	7	+31	25
2	Dnepr Mogilev	15	11	2	2	28	4	+24	24
3	Dinamo Brest	15	8	3	4	21	10	+11	19
4	Traktor Bobruisk	15	8	3	4	13	10	+3	19
5	Khimik Grodno	15	9	0	6	21	17	+4	18
6	KIM Vitebsk	15	7	3	5	21	14	+7	17
7	Torpedo Mogilev	15	4	8	3	16	14	+2	16
8	Vedrich Rechitsa	15	6	3	6	17	19	−2	15
9	Metallurg Molodechno	15	5	5	5	11	12	−1	15
10	Torpedo Minsk	15	5	3	7	15	17	−2	13
11	Shakhtyor Soligorsk	15	5	3	7	15	17	−2	13
12	Obuvshchik Lida	15	4	3	8	13	18	−5	11
13	BelAZ Zhodino	15	5	0	10	13	31	−18	10
14	Stroitel Starye Dorogi	15	4	2	9	14	22	−8	10
15	SKB-Lokomotiv Vitebsk	15	4	2	9	16	28	−12	10
16	Gomselmash Gomel	15	1	3	11	5	37	−32	5

Source: rsssf.com
Rules for classification: 1st points; 2nd matches won; 3rd head-to-head
(C) Champions

== Results ==
Home \ Away	BZH	DBR	DMI	DNE	GOM	KHG	KIM	MMO	OBU	SHA	SKB	STR	TMI	TMO	TBO	VED
BelAZ Zhodino		1–0			2–0	2–0	1–3	0–1	1–0	0–2	2–1					
Dinamo Brest			0–0	0–1				2–1				3–0	2–0	1–1	2–0	3–2
Dinamo Minsk	8–1					6–0		0–0		2–1		2–0		2–0	1–0	6–0
Dnepr Mogilev	2–1		0–1			2–0		3–0				4–1		0–0	0–1	1–0
Gomselmash Gomel		0–1	0–1	0–6								1–0	1–4	0–0	0–1	
Khimik Grodno		1–0			5–0		3–2	1–0	1–0	3–0	4–1		2–0			
KIM Vitebsk		1–0	3–0	0–0	5–0							1–0	1–0		1–1	
Metallurg Molodechno					1–1		1–0		0–0		1–0	0–0		2–3	1–0	
Obuvshchik Lida		0–2	1–5	0–2	4–1		3–0						0–0		2–0	
Shakhtyor Soligorsk		1–1		0–2	3–0		0–2	0–3	2–1		4–0		0–1			
SKB-Lokomotiv Vitebsk		1–4	1–1	0–3	3–0		2–1		2–0				2–1			
Stroitel Starye Dorogi	2–1					2–0			1–2	0–1	3–1			2–2		2–0
Torpedo Minsk	3–0		0–3	0–2				0–0				3–1		2–3	0–0	1–0
Torpedo Mogilev	5–1					0–1	0–0		0–0	0–0	1–0					1–1
Traktor Bobruisk	1–0					1–0				1–0	2–2	1–0		2–0		2–1
Vedrich Rechitsa	3–0				1–1	1–0	3–1	2–0	1–0	1–1	1–0					

Source: rsssf.com
Legend: Blue = home team win; Yellow = draw; Red = away team win.

== Top scorers ==
Rank	Name	Team	Goals
1	(Belarus) Andrey Skorobogatko	Dnepr Mogilev	11
2	(Belarus) Sergey Yasinsky	SKB-Lokomotiv Vitebsk	8
3	(Belarus) Valyantsin Byalkevich	Dinamo Minsk	7
3	(Belarus) Sergey Koroza	Khimik Grodno	7
5	(Belarus) Dmitry Barabash	Torpedo Mogilev	6
5	(Belarus) Sergey Teplyakov	Torpedo Mogilev	6
5	(Belarus) Vladimir Kavalenya	Shakhtyor Soligorsk	6
5	(Belarus) Syarhey Herasimets	Dinamo Minsk	6
5	(Belarus) Yury Mazurchik	Khimik Grodno	6

== See also ==
- 1992 Belarusian First League
- 1992 Belarusian Cup
