= 1946 Estonian SSR Football Championship =

Estonian SSR Higher League
- Season: 1946
- Champions: Baltic Fleet Tallinn; 1st title

The 1946 Estonian SSR Football Championship was won by Baltic Fleet Tallinn.

Tallinna Kalev was admitted to the Soviet competitions for the 1947 Vtoraya Gruppa.

== League table ==
| Pos | Team | Pld | W | D | L | GF | GA | GD | Pts |
|---|---|---|---|---|---|---|---|---|---|
| 1 | Baltic Fleet Tallinn (C) | 10 | 8 | 1 | 1 | 31 | 10 | +21 | 17 |
| 2 | DO (Note: The DO stands for the Soviet Army sports organization like Officers' Club (Dom Ofitserov - house of officers).) Tallinn | 10 | 6 | 2 | 2 | 18 | 10 | +8 | 14 |
| 3 | Tallinna Kalev | 10 | 5 | 1 | 4 | 17 | 10 | +7 | 11 |
| 4 | Rakvere Dünamo | 10 | 4 | 3 | 3 | 13 | 11 | +2 | 11 |
| 5 | Tallinna Dünamo II | 10 | 2 | 1 | 7 | 9 | 22 | −13 | 5 |
| 6 | Tallinna Spartak | 10 | 1 | 0 | 9 | 8 | 33 | −25 | 2 |

(C) Champions
