= 1946 Football Championship of the Ukrainian SSR =

Football Championship of UkrSSR
- Season: 1946
- Champions: FC Spartak Uzhhorod
- Promoted: FC Spartak Uzhhorod, ODO Kiev, FC Dzerzhynets Kharkiv, FC Bilshovyk Zaporizhia, FC Spartak Kherson, FC Spartak Lviv, FC Dynamo Voroshylohrad, Moldavian rep.

The 1946 Football Championship of Ukrainian SSR were part of the 1946 Soviet republican football competitions in the Soviet Ukraine as well as so called Soviet "Tretya Gruppa" (Group 3) which by some football enthusiasts consider a predecessor of the Soviet Second League.

It was the first republican league competition in Ukraine following the World War II. Competitions were restructured and instead of tiered competitions, all tiers were combined into single tier divided by geographic groups.

Except for Spartak Kyiv, the top 2 from each qualification group also qualified for the 1947 Vtoraya Gruppa, Zone Ukraine.

Beside Ukrainian teams, in competitions took place one Moldovan team, Spartak Chisinau (Southern Group).

== Teams ==
=== Debuting ===
Bilshovyk Zaporizhia, Dynamo Chernihiv, Dynamo Chortkiv (withdrew), Dynamo Kirovohrad, Dynamo Lutsk, Dynamo Rivne, Dynamo Sumy, Dynamo Voroshylovhrad, Dzerzhynets Kharkiv, Lokomotyv Ternopil, Lokomotyv Yasynuvata, Spartak Chernivtsi, Spartak Chisinau, Spartak Drohobych, Spartak Izmail, Spartak Kherson, Spartak Lviv, Spartak Stanislav, Spartak Uzhhorod, Stakhanovets Rutchenkove, Stal Mariupol, Zdorovia Kharkiv

=== Relegated ===
Lokomotyv Kyiv, Silmash Kharkiv

=== Returning ===
Dynamo Odesa (last in 1939), ODO Kyiv (last in 1939), Dynamo Dnipropetrovsk (last in 1937), Spartak Kyiv (last in 1937)

=== Renamed ===
UDKA Kyiv → ODO Kyiv

== Qualification group stage ==
=== West ===
| Pos | Team | Pld | W | D | L | GF | GA | GD | Pts |
|---|---|---|---|---|---|---|---|---|---|
| 1 | Spartak Uzhhorod | 14 | 13 | 1 | 0 | 77 | 14 | +63 | 27 |
| 2 | Spartak Lviv | 14 | 12 | 1 | 1 | 81 | 14 | +67 | 25 |
| 3 | Dynamo Lutsk | 0 | – | – | – | – | – | — | 0 |
| 4 | Spartak Chernivtsi | 14 | 5 | 2 | 7 | 31 | 52 | −21 | 12 |
| 5 | Spartak Drohobych | 0 | – | – | – | – | – | — | 0 |
| 6 | Spartak Stanislav | 0 | – | – | – | – | – | — | 0 |
| 7 | Lokomotyv Ternopil | 0 | – | – | – | – | – | — | 0 |
| 8 | Dynamo Rivne | 0 | – | – | – | – | – | — | 0 |

- Lokomotyv Ternopil replaced Dynamo Chortkiv which withdrew after Round 2. The Dynamo's record was passed on to Lokomotyv.

=== Center ===
| Pos | Team | Pld | W | D | L | GF | GA | GD | Pts |
|---|---|---|---|---|---|---|---|---|---|
| 1 | ODO Kyiv | 18 | 18 | 0 | 0 | 87 | 8 | +79 | 36 |
| 2 | Spartak Kyiv | 0 | – | – | – | – | – | — | 0 |
| 3 | Spartak Dnipropetrovsk | 0 | – | – | – | – | – | — | 0 |
| 4 | Dynamo Sumy | 18 | 7 | 6 | 5 | – | – | — | 20 |
| 5 | Lokomotyv Kyiv | 0 | – | – | – | – | – | — | 0 |
| 6 | Spartak Poltava | 18 | 8 | 0 | 10 | – | – | — | 16 |
| 7 | Dynamo Dnipropetrovsk | 0 | – | – | – | – | – | — | 0 |
| 8 | Dynamo Zhytomyr | 18 | 4 | 0 | 14 | – | – | — | 8 |
| 9 | Dynamo Chernihiv | 0 | – | – | – | – | – | — | 0 |
| 10 | Dynamo Proskuriv | 0 | – | – | – | – | – | — | 0 |

=== East ===
| Pos | Team | Pld | W | D | L | GF | GA | GD | Pts |
|---|---|---|---|---|---|---|---|---|---|
| 1 | Dzerzhynets Kharkiv | 18 | 13 | 1 | 4 | 56 | 21 | +35 | 27 |
| 2 | Dynamo Voroshylovhrad | 18 | 11 | 3 | 4 | 38 | 23 | +15 | 25 |
| 3 | Stal Mariupol | 0 | – | – | – | – | – | — | 0 |
| 4 | Silmash Kharkiv | 0 | – | – | – | – | – | — | 0 |
| 5 | Avanhard Kramatorsk | 0 | – | – | – | – | – | — | 0 |
| 6 | Stal Kostyantynivka | 0 | – | – | – | – | – | — | 0 |
| 7 | Lokomotyv Yasynuvata | 0 | – | – | – | – | – | — | 0 |
| 8 | Zdorovia Kharkiv | 0 | – | – | – | – | – | — | 0 |
| 9 | Avanhard Horlivka | 0 | – | – | – | – | – | — | 0 |
| 10 | Stakhanovets Rutchenkove | 0 | – | – | – | – | – | — | 0 |

=== South ===
| Pos | Team | Pld | W | D | L | GF | GA | GD | Pts |
|---|---|---|---|---|---|---|---|---|---|
| 1 | Bilshovyk Zaporizhia | 14 | 13 | 1 | 0 | 38 | 9 | +29 | 27 |
| 2 | Spartak Kherson | 14 | 11 | 1 | 2 | 47 | 18 | +29 | 23 |
| 3 | Dynamo Odesa | 0 | – | – | – | – | – | — | 0 |
| 4 | Spartak Chisinau | 14 | 6 | 1 | 7 | 23 | 29 | −6 | 13 |
| 5 | Sudnobudivnyk-2 Mykolaiv | 14 | 6 | 1 | 7 | 22 | 29 | −7 | 13 |
| 6 | Spartak Vinnytsia | 14 | 5 | 0 | 9 | 25 | 25 | 0 | 10 |
| 7 | Dynamo Kirovohrad | 14 | 3 | 2 | 9 | 16 | 26 | −10 | 8 |
| 8 | Spartak Izmail | 0 | – | – | – | – | – | — | 0 |

== Final ==
| Pos | Team | Pld | W | D | L | GF | GA | GD | Pts |
|---|---|---|---|---|---|---|---|---|---|
| 1 | FC Spartak Uzhhorod | 3 | 3 | 0 | 0 | 16 | 3 | +13 | 6 |
| 2 | ODO Kiev | 3 | 2 | 0 | 1 | 9 | 6 | +3 | 4 |
| 3 | FC Dzerzhynets Kharkiv | 3 | 0 | 1 | 2 | 3 | 10 | −7 | 1 |
| 4 | FC Bilshovyk Zaporizhia | 3 | 0 | 1 | 2 | 5 | 14 | −9 | 1 |

== Ukrainian clubs at the All-Union level ==
- First Group (1): Dynamo Kyiv
- Second Group (5): Lokomotyv Kharkiv, Kharchovyk Odesa, Shakhtar Stalino, Stal Dnipropetrovsk, Sudnobudivnyk Mykolaiv

== Number of teams by region ==
| Number | Region | Team(s) | |
| Number | Region | Ukrainian SSR | All-Union |
|---|---|---|---|
| 6 (1) | Donetsk Oblast | Stal Mariupol, Avanhard Kramatorsk, Stal Kostiantynivka, Lokomotyv Yasynuvata, Avanhard Horlvika, Stakhanovets Rutchenkove | Stakhanovets Stalino |
| 3 (1) | Kyiv Oblast | ODO Kyiv, Spartak Kyiv, Lokomotyv Kyiv | Dynamo Kyiv |
| 3 (1) | Kharkiv Oblast | Dzerzhynets Kharkiv, Silmash Kharkiv, Zdorovia Kharkiv | Dynamo Kharkiv |
| 2 (1) | Dnipropetrovsk Oblast | Spartak Dnipropetrovsk, Dynamo Dnipropetrovsk | Stal Dnipropetrovsk |
| 2 (0) | Ternopil Oblast | Lokomotyv Ternopil, Dynamo Chortkiv | – |
| 1 (1) | Mykolaiv Oblast | Sudnobudivnyk-2 Mykolaiv | Sudnobudivnyk Mykolaiv |
| 1 (1) | Odesa Oblast | Dynamo Odesa | Kharchovyk Odesa |
| 1 (0) | Luhansk Oblast | Dynamo Voroshylovhrad | |
| 1 (0) | Zaporizhia Oblast | Bilshovyk Zaporizhia | – |
| 1 (0) | Poltava Oblast | Spartak Poltava | – |
| 1 (0) | Sumy Oblast | Dynamo Sumy | – |
| 1 (0) | Chernihiv Oblast | Dynamo Chernihiv | – |
| 1 (0) | Zhytomyr Oblast | Dynamo Zhytomyr | – |
| 1 (0) | Khmelnytskyi Oblast | Dynamo Proskuriv | – |
| 1 (0) | Kirovohrad Oblast | Dynamo Kirovohrad | – |
| 1 (0) | Vinnytsia Oblast | Spartak Vinnytsia | – |
| 1 (0) | Ivano-Frankivsk Oblast | Spartak Stanislav | – |
| 1 (0) | Lviv Oblast | Spartak Lviv | – |
| 1 (0) | Volyn Oblast | Dynamo Lutsk | – |
| 1 (0) | Rivne Oblast | Dynamo Rivne | – |
| 1 (0) | Zakarpattia Oblast | Spartak Uzhhorod | – |
| 1 (0) | Chernivtsi Oblast | Spartak Chernivtsi | – |
| 1 (0) | Kherson Oblast | Spartak Kherson | – |
| 1 (0) | (Soviet Union) Drohobych Oblast | Spartak Drohobych | – |
| 1 (0) | (Soviet Union) Izmail Oblast | Spartak Izmail | – |
| 1 (0) | Moldavian Soviet Socialist Republic | Spartak Chisinau | – |
