= 1953 Estonian SSR Football Championship =

Estonian SSR Higher League
- Season: 1953
- Champions: Tallinna Dünamo Tallinn; 5th title

The 1953 Estonian SSR Football Championship was won by Tallinna Dünamo.

== League table ==
Pos	Team	Pld	W	D	L	GF	GA	GD	Pts
1	Tallinna Dünamo (C)	18	12	3	3	54	18	+36	27
2	Narva Kalev	18	11	3	4	50	13	+37	25
3	Tallinna Kalev II	18	11	3	4	54	26	+28	25
4	Pärnu Kalev	18	10	4	4	39	28	+11	24
5	Kohtla-Järve Kalev	18	11	0	7	44	11	+33	22
6	Järvakandi Kalev	18	7	3	8	16	19	−3	17
7	Viljandi Spartak	18	7	3	8	25	41	−16	17
8	Rakvere Dünamo	18	6	1	11	20	43	−23	13
9	Kiviõli Kalev	18	2	3	13	14	59	−45	7
10	Tartu ÜSK (R)	18	1	1	16	10	68	−58	3

(C) Champions; (R) Relegated
