= 1983 Estonian SSR Football Championship =

Estonian SSR Higher League
- Season: 1983
- Champions: Tallinna Dünamo; 10th title

The 1983 Estonian SSR Football Championship was won by Tallinna Dünamo.

== League table ==
Pos	Team	Pld	W	D	L	GF	GA	GD	Pts
1	Tallinna Dünamo (C)	22	16	3	3	48	19	+29	35
2	Tempo	22	14	6	2	38	19	+19	34
3	Pärnu Kalakombinaat	22	14	6	2	56	20	+36	34
4	Jõhvi Estonia Kaevandus	22	14	5	3	48	20	+28	33
5	Narva Baltika	22	12	5	5	31	30	+1	29
6	Norma	22	9	3	10	42	43	−1	21
7	Kohtla-Järve Ehitaja	22	6	9	7	23	19	+4	21
8	Sillamäe Kalev	22	6	5	11	25	36	−11	17
9	Dvigatel	22	6	3	13	21	44	−23	15
10	Pärnu KEK	22	5	4	13	22	47	−25	14
11	Narva Energia (R)	22	4	3	15	24	81	−57	11
12	Tartu Kalev (R)	22	0	0	22	0	0	0	0 (Note: Withdrew after first round. All matches awarded to opponents.)

(C) Champions; (R) Relegated
