= 1945 Estonian SSR Football Championship =

Estonian SSR Higher League
- Season: 1945
- Champions: Tallinna Dünamo; 1st title

The 1945 Estonian SSR Football Championship was won by Tallinna Dünamo.

Unlike the 1941 championship, which was dominated by the Dynamo sports society, this championship had representation of several teams from the Baltic Military District. Also, the Estonian Sports Association Kalev as one of the few national Estonian sports organizations was admitted to the Soviet competition.

After the win, Tallinna Dünamo was admitted to the 1946 Football Championship of the Russian SFSR, third tier (west group).

== League table ==
Pos	Team	Pld	W	D	L	GF	GA	GD	Pts
1	Tallinna Dünamo (C)	7	6	0	1	30	7	+23	12
2	Baltic Fleet Tallinn	7	5	1	1	26	9	+17	11
3	Rifle corps 2nd XI	7	4	2	1	22	9	+13	10
4	Rifle corps 1st XI	7	4	1	2	17	9	+8	9
5	Tallinna Kalev	7	3	1	3	11	16	−5	7
6	Tallinna Spartak	7	1	1	5	10	30	−20	3
7	Rakvere Dünamo	7	1	0	6	8	28	−20	2
8	Pärnu Kalev	7	1	0	6	13	29	−16	2

(C) Champions
