= 1978 Estonian SSR Football Championship =

Estonian SSR Higher League
- Season: 1978
- Champions: Tallinna Dünamo; 7th title

The 1978 Estonian SSR Football Championship was won by Tallinna Dünamo.

== League table ==
| Pos | Team | Pld | W | D | L | GF | GA | GD | Pts |
|---|---|---|---|---|---|---|---|---|---|
| 1 | Tallinna Dünamo (C) | 22 | 15 | 5 | 2 | 46 | 13 | +33 | 35 |
| 2 | Pärnu Kalakombinaat | 22 | 11 | 8 | 3 | 51 | 21 | +30 | 30 |
| 3 | Dvigatel | 22 | 13 | 4 | 5 | 37 | 14 | +23 | 30 |
| 4 | Sillamäe Kalev | 22 | 10 | 7 | 5 | 52 | 27 | +25 | 27 |
| 5 | Kohtla-Järve Keemik | 22 | 11 | 5 | 6 | 28 | 16 | +12 | 27 |
| 6 | Narva Baltika | 22 | 9 | 8 | 5 | 35 | 17 | +18 | 26 |
| 7 | Norma | 22 | 10 | 4 | 8 | 33 | 22 | +11 | 24 |
| 8 | Jõhvi Estonia Kaevandus | 22 | 10 | 4 | 8 | 36 | 34 | +2 | 24 |
| 9 | Aseri SK | 22 | 6 | 4 | 12 | 23 | 42 | −19 | 16 |
| 10 | Tempo | 22 | 5 | 4 | 13 | 21 | 38 | −17 | 14 |
| 11 | Tartu Kontrollaparaaditehas | 22 | 2 | 3 | 17 | 15 | 70 | −55 | 7 |
| 12 | Tallinna Autobussipark (R) | 22 | 1 | 2 | 19 | 13 | 72 | −59 | 4 |

(C) Champions; (R) Relegated
