= 1981 Estonian SSR Football Championship =

Estonian SSR Higher League
- Season: 1981
- Champions: Tallinna Dünamo; 9th title

The 1981 Estonian SSR Football Championship was won by Tallinna Dünamo.

== League table ==
Pos	Team	Pld	W	D	L	GF	GA	GD	Pts
1	Tallinna Dünamo (C)	22	15	6	1	51	17	+34	36
2	Pärnu Kalakombinaat	22	14	4	4	47	26	+21	32
3	Narva Baltika	22	12	6	4	43	24	+19	30
4	Jõhvi Estonia Kaevandus	22	12	5	5	31	25	+6	29
5	Tempo	22	9	5	8	28	31	−3	23
6	Dvigatel	22	8	7	7	36	30	+6	23
7	TPI Tallinn	22	6	7	9	38	31	+7	19
8	Norma	22	6	6	10	30	29	+1	18
9	FK Viljandi	22	6	5	11	21	45	−24	17
10	Sillamäe Kalev	22	5	6	11	22	28	−6	16
11	Narva Energia (R)	22	5	2	15	25	50	−25	12
12	Tallinna Autobussipark (R)	22	3	3	16	28	64	−36	9

(C) Champions; (R) Relegated
