= 1941 Estonian Football Championship =

1941 Estonian SSR Championship
- Dates: 25 May – 15 June (interrupted)

The 1941 Estonian SSR Football Championship was the 1st football league season in the Estonian SSR. The Soviet administration liquidated original Estonian clubs and introduced number of the Soviet sports societies such as Dünamo (state police), Spartak (Komsomol), Lokomotiv (railway).

The first stage was scheduled from 25 May to 15 June. The championship was interrupted by the Nazi German invasion of the Soviet Union in June of 1941.

== Participants ==
- Tallinna Dünamo
- Tallinna Lokomotiv
- Tartu Dünamo
- AÜ Spordiselts
- Tallinna Spartak
- Pärnu Spartak

== See also ==
- Estonian Soviet Socialist Republic#Soviet occupation of Estonia
- German occupation of Estonia during World War II
