= 1980 Estonian SSR Football Championship =

Estonian SSR Higher League
- Season: 1980
- Champions: Tallinna Dünamo; 8th title

The 1980 Estonian SSR Football Championship was won by Tallinna Dünamo.

== League table ==
Pos	Team	Pld	W	D	L	GF	GA	GD	Pts
1	Tallinna Dünamo (C)	22	14	7	1	49	9	+40	35
2	Narva Baltika	22	11	7	4	39	23	+16	29
3	Pärnu Kalakombinaat	22	10	7	5	27	21	+6	27
4	Sillamäe Kalev	22	9	8	5	34	24	+10	26
5	Jõhvi Estonia Kaevandus	22	8	8	6	30	28	+2	24
6	Norma	22	7	8	7	35	20	+15	22
7	Kohtla-Järve Keemik	22	8	6	8	26	22	+4	22
8	Narva Energia	22	6	7	9	23	31	−8	19
9	Tempo	22	5	8	9	23	28	−5	18
10	Dvigatel	22	6	6	10	19	33	−14	18
11	Tartu Katseremonditehas (R)	22	5	7	10	18	35	−17	17
12	Kohtla-Järve Betoonitehas (R)	22	1	5	16	6	55	−49	7

(C) Champions; (R) Relegated
