= 1954 Estonian SSR Football Championship =

Estonian SSR Higher League
- Season: 1955
- Champions: Tallinna Dünamo; 6th title

The 1954 Estonian SSR Football Championship season was won by Tallinna Dünamo.

== League table ==
Pos	Team	Pld	W	D	L	GF	GA	GD	Pts
1	Tallinna Dünamo (C)	18	11	4	3	38	18	+20	26
2	Narva Kalev	18	10	3	5	30	16	+14	23
3	Viljandi Spartak	18	11	1	6	40	28	+12	23
4	Järvakandi Kalev	18	9	3	6	23	20	+3	21
5	Kiviõli Kalev	18	8	3	7	22	22	0	19
6	Tartu Dünamo	18	6	3	9	18	25	−7	15
7	Pärnu Kalev	18	7	0	11	22	34	−12	14
8	Kohtla-Järve Kalev	18	6	2	10	21	38	−17	14
9	Tallinna Kalev II (R)	18	5	3	10	20	28	−8	13
10	Rakvere Dünamo (R)	18	3	6	9	8	14	−6	12

(C) Champions; (R) Relegated
