= 1992 Belarusian First League =

Belarusian First League
- Season: 1992
- Champions: Dinamo-2 Minsk
- Promoted: Dinamo-2 Minsk
- Relegated: Luch Minsk; Orbita Minsk
- Matches: 121
- Goals: 321 (2.65 per match)
- Top goalscorer: (Azerbaijan) Ruslan Lukin (16)
- Biggest home win: Dinamo-2 7–1 Neman
- Biggest away win: Polesye 1–7 Dinamo-2; Kolos 0–6 Dinamo-2
- Highest scoring: Polesye 1–7 Dinamo-2; Dinamo-2 7–1 Neman; Belarus 4–4 Selmash

1992 Belarusian First League was the first season of 2nd level football championship in Belarus. It started in April and ended in June 1992.

== Teams ==
Location of teams in 1992 Belarusian First League

The first teams to participate in the Belarusian 2nd level football league were five teams formerly of Belarusian SSR Top League, ten teams from Belarusian SSR First League and the Dinamo Minsk reserve team which previously played in the Soviet Top League reserve teams' championship.

Team	Location	League and position in 1991	
Dinamo-2	Minsk	Soviet Top League reserves	2
KIM-2	Vitebsk	Belarusian SSR First League	7
Orbita	Minsk	Belarusian SSR First League	8
Selmash	Mogilev	Belarusian SSR First League	13
SKIF-RShVSM	Minsk	Belarusian SSR First League	14
Khimvolokno	Grodno	Belarusian SSR First League	15
Kolos	Ustye	Belarusian SSR Second League, Group 1	2
Shinnik	Bobruisk	Belarusian SSR Second League, Group 1	3
Belarus	Maryina Gorka	Belarusian SSR Second League, Group 1	4
Polesye	Mozyr	Belarusian SSR Second League, Group 1	5
Neman	Stolbtsy	Belarusian SSR Second League, Group 1	6
Khimik	Svetlogorsk	Belarusian SSR Second League, Group 1	7
Luch	Minsk	Belarusian SSR Second League, Group 2	1
Kommunalnik	Pinsk	Belarusian SSR Second League, Group 2	2
Niva	Samokhvalovichi	Belarusian SSR Second League, Group 2	3
Stankostroitel	Smorgon	Belarusian SSR Second League, Group 2	5

== League table ==
Pos	Team	Pld	W	D	L	GF	GA	GD	Pts	Promotion or relegation
1	Dinamo-2 Minsk (P)	15	11	2	2	56	15	+41	24	Promotion to Belarusian Premier League
2	Shinnik Bobruisk	15	11	2	2	24	6	+18	24	
3	Kommunalnik Pinsk	15	8	4	3	20	13	+7	20	
4	Selmash Mogilev	15	6	5	4	25	14	+11	17	
5	Niva Samokhvalovichi	15	5	7	3	17	14	+3	17	
6	SKIF-RShVSM Minsk	15	6	4	5	19	19	0	16	
7	Polesye Mozyr	15	5	6	4	18	22	−4	16	
8	Khimvolokno Grodno	15	6	3	6	12	16	−4	15	
9	Khimik Svetlogorsk	15	4	7	4	15	18	−3	15	
10	Neman Stolbtsy	15	6	2	7	19	19	0	14	
11	Kolos Ustye	15	6	1	8	17	25	−8	13	
12	Luch Minsk (R)	15	4	4	7	22	18	+4	12	Relegation to amateur level
13	KIM-2 Vitebsk	15	3	5	7	12	22	−10	11 (Note: KIM-2 Vitebsk placed above Belarus Maryina Gorka by better head-to-head record (1–0 win).)	
14	Belarus Maryina Gorka	15	3	5	7	15	26	−11	11	
15	Orbita Minsk (R)	15	1	6	8	14	37	−23	8	Relegation to amateur level
16	Stankostroitel Smorgon	15	3	1	11	13	34	−21	7	

Source: rsssf.com
Rules for classification: 1st points; 2nd matches won; 3rd head-to-head (points, matches won, goal difference, goals scored); 4th goal difference; 5th goals scored.
(P) Promoted; (R) Relegated

=== Play-offs ===
25 June 1992

Dinamo-2 Minsk	3–0	Shinnik Bobruisk

Traktor Stadium, Minsk

== Top goalscorers ==
Rank	Goalscorer	Team	Goals
1	(Azerbaijan) Ruslan Lukin	Dinamo-2 Minsk	16
2	(Belarus) Pyotr Kachura	Dinamo-2 Minsk	15
3	(Belarus) Yuri Shukanov	Dinamo-2 Minsk	14
4	(Belarus) Dmitry Klyuiko	Shinnik Bobruisk	11
5	(Belarus) Pavel Shavrov	Neman Stolbtsy	10

== See also ==
- 1992 Belarusian Premier League
- 1992 Belarusian Cup
