= 1946 Soviet First League =

Soviet First League
- Season: 1946

The 1946 Vtoraya Gruppa was the 7th season of the Soviet second tier football competitions and the 2nd following the War.

In the 1946 season, VVS Moscow finished top of the Southern Group, and FC Pishchevik Moscow finished top of the Eastern Group. VVS won the two-leg playoff.

The number of participating teams was increased from 18 to 26 and split into two groups of 13.

== Teams ==
=== Relegated teams ===
- FC Lokomotiv Moscow – placed last (12th) in the 1945 Soviet Top League (debut)

=== Promoted teams ===
- FC Burevestnik Moscow – (returning, last competed in 1940)
- FC Pischevik Moscow – (returning, last competed in 1940)
- FC Sudostroitel Nikolaev – (returning, last competed in 1940)
- FC Dinamo Rostov-na-Donu – (returning, last competed in 1939)
- FC Lokomotivi Tbilisi – (returning, last competed in 1939)
- FC Stal Dnepropetrovsk – (returning, last competed in 1939)
- DO Sverdlovsk – (debut)
- FC Elektrosila Leningrad – (debut)
- FC Neftyanik Baku – (debut)
- FC Pischevik Leningrad – (debut)
- FC VMS Moscow – (debut)

== League standings ==
=== Southern Group ===
Pos	Republic	Team	Pld	W	D	L	GF	GA	GD	Pts
1	Russian SFSR	VVS Moscow	42	25	12	5	68	31	+37	62
2	Georgian SSR	DO Tbilisi	42	23	13	6	59	26	+33	58 (Note: 1 point deducted?)
3	Ukrainian SSR	FC Lokomotiv Kharkov	42	19	15	8	65	35	+30	50 (Note: 3 points deducted?)
4	Ukrainian SSR	FC Pishchevik Odessa	42	19	8	15	55	45	+10	46
5	Ukrainian SSR	FC Shakhtyor Stalino	42	17	12	13	62	46	+16	46
6	Georgian SSR	FC Lokomotiv Tbilisi	42	16	14	12	46	36	+10	44 (Note: 2 points deducted?)
7	Russian SFSR	FC Trudovye Rezervy Moscow	42	16	12	14	47	44	+3	44
8	Russian SFSR	FC Lokomotiv Moscow	42	15	9	18	45	54	−9	39
9	Azerbaijan SSR	FC Neftyanik Baku	42	15	10	17	58	63	−5	40
10	Armenian SSR	FC Dinamo Yerevan	42	14	12	16	54	53	+1	40
11	Russian SFSR	FC Dynamo Rostov-on-Donu	42	14	13	15	49	55	−6	40 (Note: 1 point deducted?)
12	Ukrainian SSR	FC Stal Dnepropetrovsk	42	16	7	19	40	56	−16	39
13	Ukrainian SSR	FC Sudostroitel Nikolayev	42	15	8	19	55	59	−4	38

=== Eastern Group ===
All Russia Russian SFSR

Pos	Team	Pld	W	D	L	GF	GA	GD	Pts	Qualification
1	FC Pishchevik Moscow	42	25	12	5	68	31	+37	62	
2	FC Torpedo Gorky	42	23	13	6	59	26	+33	58 (Note: 1 point deducted?)	
3	MVO Moscow	42	19	15	8	65	35	+30	50 (Note: 3 points deducted?)	
4	FC Spartak Leningrad	42	19	8	15	55	45	+10	46	
5	DO Novosibirsk	42	17	12	13	62	46	+16	46	
6	VMS Moscow	42	16	14	12	46	36	+10	44 (Note: 2 points deducted?)	
7	FC Burevestnik Moscow	42	16	12	14	47	44	+3	44	
8	FC Dynamo Ivanovo	42	15	9	18	45	54	−9	39	
9	FC Krylya Sovetov Molotov	42	15	10	17	58	63	−5	40	
10	FC Dzerzhinets Chelyabinsk	42	14	12	16	54	53	+1	40	
11	FC Elektrosila Leningrad	42	14	13	15	49	55	−6	40 (Note: 1 point deducted?)	Relegation to republican competitions
12	DO Sverdlovsk	42	16	7	19	40	56	−16	39	
13	FC Pishchevik Leningrad	42	15	8	19	55	59	−4	38	Relegation to republican competitions

== Play off ==
VVS - Pishchevik 3:2 1:0 (first game on September 18, second - September 22, all in Moscow)

== Number of teams by republics ==
Number	Union republics	Team(s)
17	Russian SFSR	VVS Moscow, FC Trudovye Rezervy Moscow, FC Lokomotiv Moscow, FC Pischevik Moscow, MVO Moscow, FC Spartak Leningrad, VMS Moscow, FC Burevestnik Moscow, FC Elektrosila Leningrad, FC Pischevik Leningrad FC Dinamo Rostov-na-Donu, FC Torpedo Gorky, DO Novosibirsk, FC Dinamo Ivanovo, FC Krylia Sovetov Molotov, FC Dzerzhinets Chelyabinsk, DO Sverdlovsk
5	Ukrainian SSR	FC Lokomotiv Kharkov, FC Pischevik Odessa, FC Shakhter Stalino, FC Stal Dnepropetrovsk, FC Sudostroitel Nikolaev
2	Georgian SSR	ODO Tbilisi, FC Lokomotiv Tbilisi
1	Azerbaijan SSR	FC Neftianik Baku
1	Armenian SSR	FC Dinamo Yerevan

== See also ==
- 1946 Soviet First Group
