= 1949 Estonian SSR Football Championship =

Estonian SSR Higher League
- Season: 1949
- Champions: Tallinna Dünamo; 3rd title

The 1949 Estonian SSR Football Championship was won by Tallinna Dünamo.

== League table ==
Pos	Team	Pld	W	D	L	GF	GA	GD	Pts
1	Tallinna Dünamo (C)	16	14	2	0	58	11	+47	30
2	Baltic Fleet Tallinn	16	12	1	3	54	22	+32	25
3	Tallinna Esto	16	8	3	5	33	25	+8	19
4	Viljandi Dünamo	16	8	1	7	40	42	−2	17
5	Tartu Kalev	16	7	3	6	26	25	+1	17
6	Narva Dünamo	16	6	1	9	22	32	−10	13
7	Soviet Air Forces Club Sokol	16	3	3	10	18	39	−21	9
8	Pärnu Kalev	16	3	1	12	22	51	−29	7
9	Rakvere Dünamo	16	3	1	12	13	36	−23	7

(C) Champions
