= 1947 Vtoraya Gruppa =

Vtoraya Gruppa
- Season: 1947
- Dates: Regional groups: 16 May – 17 September; Final group: 28 September – 14 October
- Champions: Lokomotiv Moscow

The 1947 Vtoraya Gruppa of the Soviet football championship was the 8th season in the 2nd tier football competitions in the Soviet Union.

The number of participating teams almost tripled compared to the last season and increased again from 26 to 67 which were split into six groups. There were created three groups for the Russian SFSR, one for the Ukrainian SSR, one group of Transcaucasian union republics and one group for the Central Asian union republics. The smaller republics of Baltics along with Belarus competed in of the groups designated for the Russian SFSR, known as the Central Group, while the Moldavian representative took part along with Ukrainian teams. In this championship participated at least one team from almost all of the union republics of the Soviet Union except for the Karelo-Finnish SSR. The Karelo-Finish teams struggled and placed last in the preceding republican qualification tournament.

Six group winners qualified for the Final Group which determined the season's winner.

Lokomotiv Moscow won the championship in the Vtoraya Gruppa.

== Teams ==
=== Relegated teams ===
- none

=== Promoted teams ===
Many teams were promoted to the league that took part in republican competitions of the 1946 season. With asterisk identified teams that did not take part in the 1946 season last year.

==== Returning teams ====
- FC Dinamo Sverdlovsk – Third placed in the 1946 Football Championship of the Russian SFSR (returning, last played in 1937)
- FC Dzerzhinets Leningrad – (returning, last played in 1940)
- FC Dinamo Kazan – (returning, last played in 1939)
- FC Dinamo Baku – (returning, last played in 1945)
- FC Spartak Yerevan – (returning, last played in 1940)

==== First appearance ====
- FC Dinamo Riga – Champions of the 1946 Football Championship of the Russian SFSR (debut)
- FC Zenit Kaliningrad – Runner-up of the 1946 Football Championship of the Russian SFSR (debut)
- FC Dinamo Saratov – Fourth placed in the 1946 Football Championship of the Russian SFSR (debut)
- FC Krylia Sovetov Novosibirsk – Fifth placed in the 1946 Football Championship of the Russian SFSR (debut)
- FC Dinamo Vilnius – (debut)
- DO Leningrad – (debut)
- FC Zenit Izhevsk – (debut)
- FC Zenit Kovrov – (debut)
- FC Khimik Dzerzhinsk – (debut)
- FC Dinamo Chelyabinsk – (debut)
- FC Dzerzhinets Nizhniy Tagil – (debut)
- FC Krylia Sovetov Omsk – (debut)
- FC Spartak Uzhhorod – Champions of the 1946 Football Championship of the Ukrainian SSR (debut)
- FC Krylia Sovetov Tbilisi – Champions of the 1946 Football Championship of Transcaucasia (debut)
- FC Dinamo Alma-Ata – Champions of the 1946 Football Championship of Central Asia (debut)
- DO Minsk – Champions of the 1946 Football Championship of the Belarusian SSR (debut)
- ODO Kiev – Runner-up of the 1946 Football Championship of the Ukrainian SSR (debut)
- FC Dzerzhinets Kharkov – (debut)
- FC Bolshevik Zaporozhye – (debut)
- FC Spartak Lviv – (debut)
- FC Spartak Kherson – (debut)
- FC Dinamo Voroshilovgrad – (debut)
- FC Dinamo Stalinabad – (debut)
- FC Lokomotiv Ashkhabad – (debut)
- FC Dinamo Frunze – (debut)
- ODO Tashkent – (debut)
- FC Dinamo Kishinev* – (debut)
- FC Kalev Tallinn* – (debut)
- FC Metro Moscow* – (debut)
- FC Sudostroitel Leningrad* – (debut)
- FC Torpedo Ulyanovsk* – (debut)
- FC Torpedo Yaroslavl* – (debut)
- FC Traktor Kuibyshev* – (debut)
- FC Krylia Sovetov Ufa* – (debut)
- FC Avangard Svedlovsk* – (debut)
- FC Dinamo Tashkent* – (debut)
- FC Spartak Alma-Ata* – (debut)
- FC Zenit Frunze* – (debut)
- FC Spartak Tashkent* – (debut)

== Qualifying stage ==
=== Central Zone ===
Pos	Team	Pld	W	D	L	GF	GA	GD	Pts	Qualification
1	Lokomotiv Moscow	28	21	3	4	56	22	+34	45	Qualified to Final Group
2	MVO Moscow	28	21	2	5	58	20	+38	44	
3	Dynamo Riga	28	16	6	6	70	38	+32	38	
4	VMS Moscow	28	15	5	8	46	36	+10	35	
5	Trudovye Rezervy Moscow	28	13	5	10	61	46	+15	31	
6	Burevestnik Moscow	28	13	5	10	52	45	+7	31	Relegation
7	DO Leningrad	28	10	10	8	26	27	−1	30	
8	Dynamo Vilnius	28	13	2	13	55	47	+8	28	
9	Metro Moscow	28	9	9	10	32	41	−9	27	
10	Spartak Leningrad	28	9	7	12	35	38	−3	25	
11	Kalev Tallinn	28	7	9	12	30	57	−27	23	
12	Pishchevik Moscow	28	8	6	14	37	45	−8	22	Relegation
13	Dzerzhynets Leningrad	28	8	2	18	34	50	−16	18	Relegation
14	Sudostroitel Leningrad	28	5	8	15	24	53	−29	18	
15	DO Minsk	28	1	3	24	15	66	−51	5	

Source: rsssf.com

=== Russian Zone 1 ===
Pos	Team	Pld	W	D	L	GF	GA	GD	Pts	Qualification
1	Torpedo Gorky	22	15	7	0	58	20	+38	37	Qualified to Final Group
2	Dynamo Saratov	22	12	4	6	54	41	+13	28	
3	Zenit Izhevsk	22	11	3	8	53	43	+10	25	
4	Kirkizh Plant Kovrov	22	10	5	7	45	39	+6	25	
5	Torpedo Ulyanovsk	22	10	5	7	32	30	+2	25	Relegation
6	Krasnoye Znamia Ivanovo	22	9	4	9	54	34	+20	22	
7	Dynamo Kazan	22	8	3	11	34	30	+4	19	
8	Khimik Dzerzhynsk	22	8	3	11	30	53	−23	19	
9	Kalinin Plant Kaliningrad	22	7	4	11	38	45	−7	18	
10	Torpedo Yaroslavl	22	5	7	10	24	37	−13	17	Relegation
11	Traktor Kuibyshev	22	5	7	10	26	50	−24	17	Relegation
12	Krylia Sovetov Ufa	22	4	4	14	34	60	−26	12	Relegation

Source: rsssf.com

=== Russian Zone 2 ===
Pos	Team	Pld	W	D	L	GF	GA	GD	Pts	Qualification
1	Dzerzhynets Chelyabinsk	18	15	1	2	62	6	+56	31	Qualified to Final Group
2	ODO Novosibirsk	18	11	5	2	35	16	+19	27	
3	Krylia Sovetov Molotov	18	9	6	3	43	24	+19	24	
4	Dynamo Chelyabinsk	18	10	1	7	35	27	+8	21	
5	ODO Sverdlovsk	18	9	2	7	33	20	+13	20	
6	Dzerzhynets Nizhniy Tagil	18	8	2	8	28	40	−12	18	
7	Dynamo Sverdlovsk	18	6	3	9	27	35	−8	15	
8	z-d imeni Baranova Omsk	18	6	2	10	26	41	−15	14	
9	Avangard Sverdlovsk	18	3	3	12	19	46	−27	9	
10	Krylia Sovetov Novosibirsk	18	0	1	17	11	64	−53	1	Relegation

Source: rsssf.com

=== Ukraine ===
The zone was formed from the 5 teams of the 1946 Vtoraya Gruppa season competing in the Southern Zone and top-8 of the 1946 Football Championship of the Ukrainian SSR. Only instead of Spartak Kyiv, there was admitted Moldavian representative Dynamo Kishenev (possibly based on Spartak Kishenev).

Pos	Team	Pld	W	D	L	GF	GA	GD	Pts	Qualification
1	Lokomotiv Kharkov (Q)	24	19	4	1	60	23	+37	42	Qualified to Final Group
2	Shakhtyor Stalino	24	15	4	5	48	19	+29	34	
3	Pishchevik Odessa	24	14	5	5	44	21	+23	33	
4	Stal Dnepropetrovsk	24	11	8	5	54	35	+19	30	
5	ODO Kiev	24	13	1	10	56	34	+22	27	
6	Spartak Lvov	24	11	4	9	47	41	+6	26	
7	Spartak Kherson	24	11	3	10	40	46	−6	25	
8	Spartak Uzhgorod	24	9	3	12	42	41	+1	21	
9	Dzerzhynets Kharkov	24	9	3	12	43	47	−4	21	
10	Sudostroitel Nikolayev	24	7	5	12	35	53	−18	19	
11	Dynamo Voroshilovgrad	24	5	4	15	32	55	−23	14	
12	Bolshevik Zaporozhie (R)	24	5	1	18	26	72	−46	11	Relegation
13	Dynamo Kishenev	24	2	5	17	21	61	−40	9	

Source: rsssf.com
(Q) Qualified for finals; (R) Relegated

=== Caucasus Zone ===
Pos	Team	Pld	W	D	L	GF	GA	GD	Pts	Qualification
1	ODO Tbilisi	14	9	3	2	35	16	+19	21	Qualified to Final Group
2	Dynamo Yerevan	14	8	4	2	34	19	+15	20	
3	Lokomotiv Tbilisi	14	7	4	3	29	17	+12	18	
4	Neftyanik Baku	14	6	3	5	28	21	+7	15	
5	Krylia Sovetov Tbilisi	14	6	2	6	20	27	−7	14	Replaced with Spartak Tbilisi
6	Dynamo Rostov-on-Don	14	5	3	6	19	20	−1	13	
7	Dynamo Baku	14	3	1	10	18	32	−14	7	
8	Spartak Yerevan	14	1	2	11	25	56	−31	4	

Source: rsssf.com

=== Central Asia Zone ===
Pos	Team	Pld	W	D	L	GF	GA	GD	Pts	Qualification
1	Dynamo Stalinabad	16	12	1	3	42	12	+30	25	Qualified to Final Group
2	Dynamo Alma-Ata	16	9	5	2	44	18	+26	23	
3	Dynamo Tashkent	16	9	2	5	28	13	+15	20	
4	Lokomotiv Ashkhabad	16	8	4	4	37	24	+13	20	
5	Dynamo Frunze	16	8	4	4	34	21	+13	20	
6	ODO Tashkent	16	6	4	6	26	23	+3	16	
7	Spartak Alma-Ata	16	4	2	10	21	47	−26	10	
8	Zenit Frunze	16	2	5	9	10	32	−22	9	
9	Spartak Tashkent	16	0	1	15	6	58	−52	1	

Source: rsssf.com

== Final stage ==
The final stage was conducting in Moscow September 28 – October 14. Participants played on stadiums Dynamo and Stalinets.

Pos	Team	Pld	W	D	L	GF	GA	GD	Pts	Qualification
1	Lokomotiv Moscow (H, C)	5	4	1	0	11	4	+7	9	Promoted to the 1948 Pervaya Gruppa
2	Torpedo Gorky	5	2	3	0	6	3	+3	7	
3	Lokomotiv Kharkov	5	3	1	1	7	4	+3	7	
4	Dzerzhynets Chelyabinsk	5	1	1	3	8	10	−2	3	
5	Dynamo Stalinabad	5	1	1	3	5	11	−6	3	
6	ODO Tbilisi	5	0	1	4	3	8	−5	1	

Source: rsssf.com
(C) Champions; (H) Hosts

== Number of teams by republics ==
Number	Union republics	Team(s)
34	Russian SFSR	FC Lokomotiv Moscow, MVO Moscow, VMS Moscow, FC Trudovye Rezervy Moscow, FC Burevestnik Moscow, DO Leningrad, FC Metro Moscow, FC Spartak Leningrad, FC Pischevik Moscow, FC Dzerzhinets Leningrad, FC Sudostroitel Leningrad FC Torpedo Gorky, FC Dinamo Saratov, FC Zenit Izhevsk, FC Kirkizh Plant Kovrov, FC Torpedo Ulyanovsk, FC Krasnoye Znamya Ivanovo, FC Dinamo Kazan, FC Khimik Dzerzhinsk, FC Kalinin Plant Kaliningrad, FC Torpedo Yaroslavl, FC Traktor Kuibyshev, FC Krylia Sovetov Ufa, FC Dzerzhinets Chelyabinsk, ODO Novosibirsk, FC Krylia Sovetov Molotov, FC Dinamo Chelyabinsk, ODO Sverdlovsk, FC Dzerzhinets Nizhniy Tagil, FC Dinamo Sverdlovsk, FC Krylia Sovetov Omsk, FC Avangard Sverdlovsk, FC Krylia Sovetov Novosibirsk, FC Dinamo Rostov-na-Donu
12	Ukrainian SSR	FC Lokomotiv Kharkov, FC Shakhter Stalino, FC Pischevik Odessa, FC Stal Dnepropetrovsk, ODO Kiev, FC Spartak Lvov, FC Spartak Kherson, FC Spartak Uzhgorod, FC Dzerzhinets Kharkov, FC Sudostroitel Nikolaev, FC Dinamo Voroshilovgrad, FC Bolshevik Zaporozhye
3	Georgian SSR	ODO Tbilisi, FC Lokomotiv Tbilisi, FC Krylia Sovetov Tbilisi
3	Uzbek SSR	FC Dinamo Tashkent, ODO Tashkent, FC Spartak Tashkent
2	Azerbaijan SSR	FC Neftianik Baku, FC Dinamo Baku
2	Armenian SSR	FC Dinamo Yerevan, FC Spartak Yerevan
2	Kazakh SSR	FC Dinamo Alma-Ata, FC Spartak Alma-Ata
2	Kyrgyz SSR	FC Dinamo Frunze, FC Zenit Frunze
1	Latvian SSR	FC Dinamo Riga
1	Estonian SSR	FC Kalev Tallinn
1	Belarusian SSR	DO Minsk
1	Lithuanian SSR	FC Dinamo Vilnius
1	Moldavian SSR	FC Dinamo Kishinev
1	Tajik SSR	FC Dinamo Stalinabad
1	Turkmen SSR	FC Lokomotiv Ashkhabat

== See also ==
- 1947 Soviet First Group
- 1947 Soviet Cup
