= 1991 Football Championship of the Belarusian SSR =

Football Championship of the Belarusian SSR – Pershaja Liha Belarusian: Першая ліга чэмпіянату БССР па футболе
- Season: 1991
- Champions: Metalurh Maladzechna (1st title)
- Relegated: 6 teams (competition reformed)

The 1991 Football Championship of the Belarusian SSR (Belarusian: Чэмпіянат БССР па футболе) was the 55th and last regular annual competition in football of the Byelorussian Soviet Socialist Republic at all-republican level. In the competition took part 44 teams in two tiers.

With the ongoing process of disintegration of the Soviet Union during 1991, upon conclusion of the season nine better clubs and six Soviet teams of masters from Belarus formed the First League (Top League) of independent Belarus.

== Overview ==
The championship consisted of three tiers: First (Pershaja), Second (Druhaja) leagues and Trade Union competitions. Six teams were participating in the All-Union competitions and represented all the regional centers of Belarusian SSR: Dynama Mensk, Dynama Brest, Dnepr Mahiljow, KIM Vitsebsk, Njoman Hrodna, Homselmash Homiel.

The First League was contested by 15 teams, and Metalurh Maladzechna won the championship.

== Pershaja Liha ==
=== Teams ===
Location of teams in 1991 First League (Pershaja Liha) of the BSSR

=== Final standings ===
Pos	Team	Pld	W	D	L	GF	GA	GD	Pts	Promotion or relegation
1	Metalurh Maladzechna	28	17	7	4	68	24	+44	41	Qualification to Belarusian Premier League
2	Tarpeda Mahiljow	28	15	7	6	55	26	+29	37	Qualification to Belarusian Premier League
3	SKB Vitsebsk	28	15	6	7	44	28	+16	36	Qualification to Belarusian Premier League
4	Tarpeda Minsk	28	14	8	6	52	29	+23	36	Qualification to Belarusian Premier League
5	Shakhtsjor Salihorsk	28	12	9	7	44	25	+19	33	Qualification to Belarusian Premier League
6	Budawnik Staryja Darohi	28	11	9	8	35	30	+5	31	Qualification to Belarusian Premier League
7	KIM Vitsebsk	28	11	7	10	32	28	+4	29	Qualification to Belarusian First League
8	Arbita Minsk	28	10	8	10	30	44	−14	28	Qualification to Belarusian First League
9	Traktar Babruisk	28	8	12	8	31	26	+5	28	Qualification to Belarusian Premier League
10	BelAZ Zhodzina	28	8	11	9	37	35	+2	27	Qualification to Belarusian Premier League
11	Abutnik Lida	28	7	8	13	23	42	−19	22	Qualification to Belarusian Premier League
12	Sputnik Minsk	28	9	4	15	36	60	−24	22	Qualification to Belarusian First League
13	SelMash Mahiljow	28	7	5	16	26	46	−20	19	Qualification to Belarusian First League
14	SKIF-ShVSM Minsk	28	6	4	18	29	63	−34	16	Qualification to Belarusian First League
15	Veras Hrodna	28	3	9	16	15	51	−36	15	Qualification to Belarusian First League

Source: rsssf.com

== Druhaja Liha final standings ==
Football Championship of the Belarusian SSR – Druhaja Liha
- Season: 1991
- Champions: Group 1: Vedrich Rechitsa; Group 2: Luch Minsk
- Promoted: Vedrich Rechitsa (competition reformed)
- Relegated: 18 teams (competition reformed)

=== Subgroup 1 ===
Pos	Team	Pld	W	D	L	GF	GA	GD	Pts	Promotion or relegation
1	Vedrich Rechitsa	26	20	2	4	67	13	+54	42	Qualification to Belarusian Premier League
2	Kolos Ustie	26	18	5	3	56	24	+32	41	Qualification to Belarusian First League
3	Shinnik Bobruisk	26	17	4	5	55	17	+38	38	Qualification to Belarusian First League
4	Belarus Maryina Gorka	26	16	4	6	33	13	+20	36	Qualification to Belarusian First League
5	Polesie Mozyr	26	13	7	6	41	22	+19	33	Qualification to Belarusian First League
6	Neman Stolbtsy	26	9	12	5	27	24	+3	30	Qualification to Belarusian First League
7	Khimik Svetlogorsk	26	11	4	11	37	38	−1	26	Qualification to Belarusian First League
8	Zaria Iazyl	26	10	5	11	42	38	+4	25	Qualification to Belarusian Second League
9	ZLiN Gomel	26	8	7	11	33	29	+4	23	Qualification to Belarusian Second League
10	Iskra Borisov	26	7	7	12	28	50	−22	21	
11	Dnepr Rogachev	26	5	7	14	29	49	−20	17	Qualification to Belarusian Second League
12	Dinamo Borisov	26	6	3	17	22	49	−27	15	
13	Dnepr Mogilev	26	5	5	16	23	45	−22	15	
14	Dnepr Bykhov	26	1	2	23	8	88	−80	4	

Source: kick-off.by, footballfacts.ru

=== Subgroup 2 ===
Pos	Team	Pld	W	D	L	GF	GA	GD	Pts	Promotion or relegation
1	Luch Minsk	28	18	7	3	59	26	+33	43	Qualification to Belarusian First League
2	Kommunalnik Pinsk	28	17	8	3	51	22	+29	42	Qualification to Belarusian First League
3	Niva Samokhvalovichi	28	18	5	5	62	27	+35	41	Qualification to Belarusian First League
4	Khimik Baranovichi	28	12	11	5	34	20	+14	35	
5	Stankostroitel Smorhon	28	15	4	9	44	36	+8	34	Qualification to Belarusian First League
6	Brestbytkhim Brest	28	11	9	8	30	25	+5	31	
7	Neman Mosty	28	10	10	8	41	35	+6	30	Qualification to Belarusian Second League
8	Kolos Dzerzhinsk	28	11	7	10	40	36	+4	29	
9	Smena-MVIZRU Minsk	28	10	3	15	39	49	−10	23	Qualification to Belarusian Second League
10	Stroitel Bereza	28	10	2	16	37	51	−14	22	Qualification to Belarusian Second League
11	Khimik Kletsk	28	6	8	14	42	63	−21	20	Qualification to Belarusian Second League
12	Metrostroi Minsk	28	7	5	16	39	47	−8	19	Qualification to Belarusian Second League
13	Traktor Minsk	28	6	7	15	33	44	−11	19	Qualification to Belarusian Second League
14	Albertin Slonim	28	6	4	18	26	67	−41	16	Qualification to Belarusian Second League
15	Fakel Oshmiany	28	5	4	19	36	66	−30	14	

Source: kick-off.by, footballfacts.ru
