= 1950 Estonian SSR Football Championship =

Estonian SSR Higher League
- Season: 1950
- Champions: Tallinna Dünamo; 4th title

The 1950 Estonian SSR Football Championship was won by Tallinna Dünamo.

== League table ==
Pos	Team	Pld	W	D	L	GF	GA	GD	Pts
1	Tallinna Dünamo (C)	18	16	1	1	53	10	+43	33
2	Baltic Fleet Tallinn	18	16	1	1	59	13	+46	33
3	Soviet Air Forces Club Sokol	18	11	3	4	34	14	+20	25
4	Rakvere Dünamo	18	9	2	7	28	17	+11	20
5	Narva Kalev	18	9	2	7	29	43	−14	20
6	Viljandi Dünamo	18	9	1	8	32	31	+1	19
7	Tallinna Spartak	18	6	2	10	21	34	−13	14
8	Narva Dünamo	18	3	3	12	22	53	−31	9
9	Pärnu Kalev	18	3	1	14	23	46	−23	7
10	Tartu Kalev	18	0	0	18	4	44	−40	0

(C) Champions
