= 1948 Soviet Cup =

1948 Cup of USSR in Football
Кубок СССР

Tournament details
- Country: Soviet Union
- Dates: September 25 – October 24
- Teams: 20

Final positions
- Champions: CDSA Moscow (2nd title)
- Runners-up: Spartak Moscow
- Semifinalists: Dinamo Moscow; Dinamo Tbilisi

The 1948 Soviet Cup was an association football cup competition of the Soviet Union. The whole competition was played in Moscow.

== Participating teams ==
Enter in First Round
Pervaya Grouppa 14/14 teams	Vtoraya Grouppa 6/75 teams
✓ CDKA Moscow; ✓ Dynamo Moscow; ✓ Spartak Moscow; ✓ Dynamo Tbilisi; ✓ Torpedo Moscow; ✓ Dynamo Leningrad; ✓ Lokomotiv Moscow; ✓ Torpedo Stalingrad; ✓ VVS Moscow; ✓ Dynamo Kiev; ✓ Krylia Sovetov Kuibyshev; ✓ Dynamo Minsk; ✓ Zenit Leningrad; ✓ Krylia Sovetov Moscow	Zone winners ✓ Metallurg Moscow (Central Zone); ✓ Dinamo Kazan (RSFSR I Zone); ✓ Dzerzhinets Chelyabinsk (RSFSR II Zone); ✓ Lokomotiv Kharkov (UkrSSR Zone); ✓ Dinamo Yerevan (South Zone); ✓ DO Tashkent (Central Asia Zone)

Source: []

== Competition schedule ==
=== First round ===
[Sep 25]
DINAMO Kiev                  2-1  Dinamo Yerevan              [aet] 
  [Pavel Vinkovatov 84, 112 – Akop Chalikyan 6] 
[Sep 26] 
Zenit Leningrad              0-0  Dinamo Kazan 
[Sep 27] 
DINAMO Leningrad             2-1  Krylya Sovetov Kuibyshev 
  [Anatoliy Viktorov 3, Vasiliy Lotkov 4 – Vasiliy Provornov 76] 
TORPEDO Moskva               5-1  Torpedo Stalingrad 
  [Alexandr Ponomaryov 45, 68, 80, Georgiy Zharkov 75, Nikolai Morozov 85 – M.Bychkov 72 pen]

==== First round replays ====
[Sep 27] 
ZENIT Leningrad              4-1  Dinamo Kazan 
  [Friedrich Maryutin 8, 73, Ivan Komarov 51, Anatoliy Korotkov 83 – Klimov 51]

=== Second round ===
[Sep 28] 
Krylya Sovetov Moskva        0-1  LOKOMOTIV Kharkov 
  [Vitaliy Zub 40] 
[Sep 29] 
DINAMO Moskva                3-0  ODO Tashkent 
  [Vladimir Savdunin 9, 59, Konstantin Beskov 18] 
[Sep 30] 
CDKA Moskva                  3-0  Dinamo Minsk 
  [Vsevolod Bobrov 15, Vyacheslav Solovyov 28, Alexei Grinin 64] 
[Oct 1] 
TORPEDO Moskva               3-1  Zenit Leningrad 
  [Pyotr Petrov 55, Georgiy Zharkov 60, Antonin Sochnev 84 – Nikolai Smirnov 44] 
[Oct 2] 
DINAMO Kiev                  2-1  Dinamo Leningrad 
  [Anatoliy Gorokhov (DL) 6 og, Laver 35 – Vasiliy Lotkov 36] 
SPARTAK Moskva               3-0  Dzerzhinets Chelyabinsk 
  [Alexei Paramonov 25, Ivan Konov 47 pen, Nikolai Dementyev 50] 
[Oct 3] 
Lokomotiv Moskva             0-1  DINAMO Tbilisi 
  [Georgiy Antadze 24] 
VVS Moskva                   2-1  Metallurg Moskva 
  [Viktor Fyodorov 60, Gromov (M) 88 og – Konstantin Krizhevskiy (V) 47 og]

=== Quarterfinals ===
[Oct 4] 
DINAMO Moskva           7-1  Lokomotiv Kharkov 
  [Vasiliy Trofimov 21, 71, Sergei Solovyov 48, Vladimir Ilyin 55, 65, Alexandr Tereshkov 70, Konstantin Beskov 72 – Mikhail Labunskiy 29]
[Oct 7] 
SPARTAK Moskva          1-0  Dinamo Kiev 
  [Alexei Paramonov 55]
[Oct 8] 
VVS Moskva              1-2  DINAMO Tbilisi 
  [Vasiliy Volkov 13 – Viktor Panyukov 2, Nikolai Todria 33] 
[Oct 12] 
CDKA Moskva             3-1  Torpedo Moskva 
  [Valentin Nikolayev 16, Vladimir Dyomin 36, Vsevolod Bobrov 54 – Alexandr Ponomaryov 4]

=== Semifinals ===
[Oct 15] 
SPARTAK Moskva          1-0  Dinamo Tbilisi 
  [Ivan Konov 14 pen] 
[Oct 17] 
CDKA Moskva             0-0  Dinamo Moskva

==== Semifinals replays ====
[Oct 18] 
CDKA Moskva             1-0  Dinamo Moskva 
  [Vladimir Dyomin 40 pen]

=== Final ===
24 October 1948

CDKA Moscow	3 – 0	Spartak Moscow
Solovyov 20', 51'; Nikolayev 71'	[ Report]

Moscow
