= 1947 Soviet Cup =

1947 Cup of USSR in Football
Кубок СССР

Tournament details
- Country: Soviet Union
- Dates: June 1–29 (qualification stage); July 1–21 (final stage)
- Teams: 80

Final positions
- Champions: Spartak Moscow (4th title)
- Runners-up: Torpedo Moscow
- Semifinalists: CDKA Moscow; Dinamo Leningrad

The 1947 Soviet Cup was an association football cup competition of the Soviet Union.

== Participating teams ==
Enter in Final Stage	Enter in Qualification Stage	
Pervaya Grouppa 13/13 teams	Vtoraya Grouppa 67/67 teams	
✓ CDKA Moscow; ✓ Dynamo Moscow; ✓ Dynamo Tbilisi; ✓ Dynamo Kiev; ✓ Torpedo Moscow; ✓ Zenit Leningrad; ✓ Krylia Sovetov Kuibyshev; ✓ Spartak Moscow; ✓ Traktor Stalingrad; ✓ Dynamo Leningrad; ✓ Krylia Sovetov Moscow; ✓ Dynamo Minsk; ✓ VVS Moscow	Central Zone (15) ✓ Lokomotiv Moscow; ✓ MVO Moscow; ✓ Dinamo Riga; ✓ VMS Moscow; ✓ Trudovye Rezervy Moscow; ✓ Burevestnik Moscow; ✓ DO Leningrad; ✓ Dinamo Vilnius; ✓ Metro Moscow; ✓ Spartak Leningrad; ✓ Kalev Tallinn; ✓ Pischevik Moscow; ✓ Dzerzhinets Leningrad; ✓ Sudostroitel Leningrad; ✓ DO Minsk RSFSR II (10) ✓ Dzerzhinets Chelyabinsk; ✓ ODO Novosibirsk; ✓ Krylya Sovetov Molotov; ✓ Dinamo Chelyabinsk; ✓ ODO Sverdlovsk; ✓ Dzerzhinets Nizhniy Tagil; ✓ Dinamo Sverdlovsk; ✓ Krylya Sovetov Omsk; ✓ Avangard Sverdlovsk; ✓ Krylya Sovetov Novosibirsk Transcaucasus (8) ✓ ODO Tbilisi; ✓ Dinamo Yerevan; ✓ Lokomotiv Tbilisi; ✓ Neftianik Baku; ✓ Krylya Sovetov Tbilisi; ✓ Dinamo Rostov-na-Donu; ✓ Dinamo Baku; ✓ Spartak Yerevan	RSFSR I (12) ✓ Torpedo Gorkiy; ✓ Dinamo Saratov; ✓ Zenit Izhevsk; ✓ Zavod imeni Kirkizh Kovrov; ✓ Torpedo Ulyanovsk; ✓ Krasnoye Znamia Ivanovo; ✓ Dinamo Kazan; ✓ Khimik Dzerzhinsk; ✓ Zavod imeni Kalinina Kaliningrad; ✓ Torpedo Yaroslavl; ✓ Traktor Kuibyshev; ✓ Krylya Sovetov Ufa UkrSSR (13) ✓ Lokomotiv Kharkov; ✓ Shakhter Stalino; ✓ Pischevik Odessa; ✓ Stal Dnepropetrovsk; ✓ ODO Kiev; ✓ Spartak Lvov; ✓ Spartak Kherson; ✓ Spartak Uzhgorod; ✓ Dzerzhinets Kharkov; ✓ Sudostroitel Nikolayev; ✓ Dinamo Voroshilovgrad; ✓ Bolshevik Zaporozhye; ✓ Dinamo Kishenev Central Asia (9) ✓ Dinamo Stalinabad; ✓ Dinamo Alma-Ata; ✓ Dinamo Tashkent; ✓ Lokomotiv Ashkhabad; ✓ Dinamo Frunze; ✓ ODO Tashkent; ✓ Spartak Alma-Ata; ✓ Zenit Frunze; ✓ Spartak Tashkent

Source: []

== Competition schedule ==
=== Preliminary stage ===
==== Group 1 (Russian Federation) ====
===== First round =====
[Jun 7] 
KHIMIK Dzerzhinsk            3-2  Krylya Sovetov Ufa 
TORPEDO Gorkiy               6-0  ZiK Kaliningrad (Moscow Region) 
[Jun 8] 
KRASNOYE ZNAMYA Ivanovo      4-1  Zenit Izhevsk 
TORPEDO Ulyanovsk            3-2  Zenit Kovrov

===== Quarterfinals =====
[Jun 15] 
DINAMO Kazan                 w/o  Torpedo Yaroslavl 
Dinamo Saratov               1-2  TRAKTOR Kuibyshev 
TORPEDO Gorkiy               5-2  Krasnoye Znamya Ivanovo 
TORPEDO Ulyanovsk            w/o  Khimik Dzerzhinsk

===== Semifinals =====
[Jun 20] 
Dinamo Kazan                 0-1  TORPEDO Ulyanovsk 
[Jun 22] 
TORPEDO Gorkiy               3-1  Traktor Kuibyshev

===== Final =====
[Jun 27] 
TORPEDO Gorkiy               5-0  Torpedo Ulyanovsk

==== Group 2 (Russian Federation) ====
===== First round =====
[Jun 1] 
DINAMO Sverdlovsk            6-1  Avangard Sverdlovsk 
ODO Novosibirsk              4-0  Krylya Sovetov Molotov

===== Quarterfinals =====
[Jun 8] 
ODO Novosibirsk              5-0  Krylya Sovetov Novosibirsk 
[Jun 9] 
DINAMO Sverdlovsk            3-0  Dzerzhinets Chelyabinsk 
Dzerzhinets Nizhniy Tagil    0-1  DINAMO Chelyabinsk 
ODO Sverdlovsk               9-0  Krylya Sovetov Omsk

===== Semifinals =====
[Jun 15] 
DINAMO Chelyabinsk           2-1  ODO Novosibirsk 
DINAMO Sverdlovsk            1-0  ODO Sverdlovsk

===== Final =====
[Jun 22] 
DINAMO Chelyabinsk           2-1  Dinamo Sverdlovsk

==== Group Caucasus ====
===== Quarterfinals =====
[Jun 1] 
DINAMO Rostov-na-Donu        3-0  Krylya Sovetov Tbilisi 
Lokomotiv Tbilisi            1-1  ODO Tbilisi 
Neftyanik Baku               2-3  DINAMO Yerevan 
SPARTAK Yerevan              2-0  Dinamo Baku

====== Quarterfinals replays ======
[Jun 2] 
LOKOMOTIV Tbilisi            1-0  ODO Tbilisi

===== Semifinals =====
[Jun 16] 
DINAMO Rostov-na-Donu        4-0  Spartak Yerevan 
DINAMO Yerevan               2-0  Lokomotiv Tbilisi

===== Final =====
[Jun 24] 
DINAMO Yerevan               6-1  Dinamo Rostov-na-Donu

==== Group Center ====
===== First round =====
[Jun 13] 
Burevestnik Moskva           1-1  Sudostroitel Leningrad 
Dinamo Riga                  0-1  METRO Moskva 
Dinamo Vilnius               2-3  PISHCHEVIK Moskva 
DO Leningrad                 1-0  Trudoviye Rezervy Moskva 
KALEV Tallinn                3-0  DO Minsk 
Spartak Leningrad            1-2  LOKOMOTIV Moskva 
VMS Moskva                   4-2  MVO Moskva

====== First round replays ======
[Jun 14] 
BUREVESTNIK Moskva           3-2  Sudostroitel Leningrad

===== Quarterfinals =====
[Jun 17] 
DO Leningrad                 3-1  Lokomotiv Moskva 
DZERZHINETS Leningrad        2-1  Pishchevik Moskva 
VMS Moskva                   2-0  Kalev Tallinn 
[Jun 18] 
BUREVESTNIK Moskva           1-0  Metro Moskva

===== Semifinals =====
[Jun 22] 
DZERZHINETS Leningrad        1-0  DO Leningrad 
VMS Moskva                   6-3  Burevestnik Moskva

===== Final =====
[Jun 29] 
Dzerzhinets Leningrad        0-5  VMS Moskva

==== Group Ukraine ====
===== First round =====
[Jun 1] 
DINAMO Kishinev              4-1  Dzerzhinets Kharkov 
ODO Kiev                     1-2  SHAKHTYOR Stalino 
Stal Dnepropetrovsk          1-1  Pishchevik Odessa 
[Jun 5] 
SPARTAK Uzhgorod             3-1  Sudostroitel Nikolayev

====== First round replays ======
[Jun 2] 
STAL Dnepropetrovsk          3-2  Pishchevik Odessa            [aet]

===== Quarterfinals =====
[Jun 15] 
DINAMO Voroshilovgrad        2-0  Lokomotiv Kharkov 
SHAKHTYOR Stalino            5-0  Bolshevik Zaporozhye 
SPARTAK Kherson              3-1  Dinamo Kishinev 
STAL Dnepropetrovsk          6-2  Spartak Uzhgorod

===== Semifinals =====
[Jun 21] 
Spartak Kherson              0-1  DINAMO Voroshilovgrad 
[Jun 22] 
Stal Dnepropetrovsk          2-2  Shakhtyor Stalino

====== Semifinals replays ======
[Jun 23] 
Stal Dnepropetrovsk          3-3  Shakhtyor Stalino 
[Jun 25] 
STAL Dnepropetrovsk          w/o  Shakhtyor Stalino 
  [Match abandoned at 2–0, when Shakhtyor had 7 players left on the pitch]

===== Final =====
[Jun 29] 
DINAMO Voroshilovgrad        3-1  Stal Dneropetrovsk

==== Group Central Asia ====
===== First round =====
[Jun 1] 
DINAMO Stalinabad            w/o  Spartak Alma-Ata

===== Quarterfinals =====
[Jun 1] 
Dinamo Frunze                1-2  ODO Tashkent                 [aet]
DINAMO Tashkent              2-1  Spartak Tashkent             [aet] 
Lokomotiv Ashkhabad          0-3  DINAMO Alma-Ata 
[Jun 8] 
Zenit Frunze                 1-4  DINAMO Stalinabad

===== Semifinals =====
[Jun 15] 
DINAMO Alma-Ata              1-0  ODO Tashkent 
Dinamo Tashkent              0-2  DINAMO Stalinabad

===== Final =====
[Jun 22] 
DINAMO Alma-Ata              2-1  Dinamo Stalinabad

=== Final stage ===
All games were played in Moscow.

==== First round ====
[Jul 1] 
SPARTAK Moskva               4-0  Torpedo Gorkiy 
  [Nikolai Dementyev 15, Ivan Konov 18, 32, Georgiy Glazkov 55] 
[Jul 2] 
CDKA Moskva                  5-0  Dinamo Yerevan 
  [Vsevolod Bobrov 1, Grigoriy Fedotov 16, Alexei Grinin 41, Alexei Vodyagin 55, Vladimir Dyomin 72] 
KRYLYA SOVETOV Kuibyshev     3-1  Dinamo Alma-Ata          [aet] 
  [Vasiliy Provornov 25, 98, 120 – Ogoltsov 26]

==== Second round ====
[Jul 3] 
Dinamo Voroshilovgrad   3-3  Dinamo Chelyabinsk            [aet]
  [Gavrilenko 34, 78, Karpeichik 112 – Zhenishek 18, 64, Bugrov 96]
[Jul 4] 
DINAMO Tbilisi          1-0  Dinamo Minsk 
  [Spartak Jejelava 19] 
[Jul 5] 
DINAMO Kiev             2-1  Traktor Stalingrad 
  [Pavel Vinkovatov 11, 16 – Viktor Shvedchenko 27 pen] 
TORPEDO Moskva          6-0  VMS Moskva 
  [Vasiliy Zharkov 39, Georgiy Zharkov 43, Alexandr Ponomaryov 56, 71, 80, Yuriy Shebilov 86] 
[Jul 6] 
CDKA Moskva             4-1  Dinamo Moskva 
  [Vsevolod Bobrov 25, 43, Vladimir Dyomin 28, 57 – Sergei Solovyov 20] 
VVS Moskva              0-1  ZENIT Leningrad 
  [Friedrich Maryutin 30] 
[Jul 7] 
Krylya Sovetov Moskva   0-2  DINAMO Leningrad 
  [Vasiliy Lotkov 15, Vladimir Kornev 60] 
SPARTAK Moskva          3-0  Krylya Sovetov Kuibyshev 
  [Alexei Sokolov 12, Sergei Salnikov 76, Nikolai Dementyev 85]

===== Second round replays =====
[Jul 4] 
DINAMO Voroshilovgrad   5-2  Dinamo Chelyabinsk            
  [Smirnov 25, Gavrilenko 38, 66, 79, Makarashvili 52 – Zhenishek 60, 76]

==== Quarterfinals ====
[Jul 8] 
TORPEDO Moskva          2-1  Dinamo Tbilisi        [aet] 
  [Vasiliy Panfilov 65, Vasiliy Zharkov 114 – Gayoz Jejelava 10] 
[Jul 9] 
CDKA Moskva             4-0  Dinamo Voroshilovgrad 
  [Vyacheslav Solovyov 6, Vsevolod Bobrov 20, Alexei Grinin 25, Vladimir Dyomin 68]
[Jul 10] 
SPARTAK Moskva          2-0  Dinamo Kiev 
  [Sergei Salnikov 25, 55] 
[Jul 11] 
DINAMO Leningrad        1-0  Zenit Leningrad       [Played in Moskva]
  [Alexandr A.Fyodorov 83]

==== Semifinals ====
[Jul 13] 
TORPEDO Moskva          1-0  CDKA Moskva 
  [Vasiliy Zharkov 30] 
[Jul 14] 
SPARTAK Moskva          2-1  Dinamo Leningrad 
  [Sergei Salnikov 10, Alexei Sokolov 68 – Vasiliy Lotkov 16]

==== Final ====
21 July 1947

Spartak Moscow	2 – 0	Torpedo Moscow
Dementyev 22'; Timakov 40'	[ Report]

Moscow
