= 1947 Estonian SSR Football Championship =

Estonian SSR Higher League
- Season: 1946
- Champions: Tallinna Dünamo; 2nd title

The 1947 Estonian SSR Football Championship was won by Tallinna Dünamo.

== League table ==
Pos	Team	Pld	W	D	L	GF	GA	GD	Pts
1	Tallinna Dünamo (C)	8	7	0	1	35	5	+30	14
2	Baltic Fleet Tallinn	8	5	1	2	14	7	+7	11
3	Rakvere Dünamo	8	2	2	4	5	21	−16	6
4	Tallinna Esto	8	1	3	4	10	10	0	5
5	Tallinna Kalev II	8	1	2	5	5	26	−21	4

(C) Champions
