= SC Spartak Lviv =

Spartak
- Full name: Sports club Spartak Lviv
- Founded: 1940; 85 years ago

Spartak Lviv (Ukrainian: «Спартак» (Львів)) was a Ukrainian and Soviet sports club. The club was based in Lviv, Ukraine and it contained several sports departments including football, ice hockey, others.

== Brief history ==
The club was founded in 1940 in place of Sparta Lwów. Until creation of FC Karpaty Lviv, it was one of the most popular football clubs in Lviv after World War II. There existed a city derby between Spartak Lviv and SKA Lviv.

In 1947 to 1949, Spartak Lviv played in the Soviet Football Championship Second Group (Vtoraya Gruppa) which was an analog of the Soviet First League. After the club failed to obtain promotion to the Soviet Top League, it was withdrawn from the All-Union football competitions and for few more years played at local competitions.

== Honours ==
- Hockey Championship of Ukrainian SSR
  - Winners (1): 1940–41
