= Football Championship of the Belarusian SSR =

Football Championship of the Belarusian SSR – Pershaja Liha
- Founded: 1922 (unofficial); 1934
- Folded: 1991 (reformed)
- Country: Belarusian SSR
- Level on pyramid: Soviet football: 4-5; Belarusian (republican) football: 1-2
- Relegation to: Regional competitions (in regions of Belarus) (Football Championship of the Byelorussian SSR – Druhaja Liha)
- Domestic cup: Football Cup of the Byelorussian SSR
- Last champions: Metalurh Maladzechna (1st title) (1991)
- Most championships: 8 - SKA Minsk (Belarusian Military District)

The Championship of the Belarusian SSR in football – First League (Belarusian: Першая ліга чэмпіянату БССР па футболе, Pershaja Liha chempijanatu BSSR pa futbole) was a top competition of association football in the Byelorussian Soviet Socialist Republic in 1922-91.

The first unofficial republican competition took place in 1922. Six years after (1928) as part of the Belarusian Spartakiade there took place the next unofficial football competitions of the republic. Since 1934 the competitions take place regularly on annual basis. Throughout its history there were 55 winners of the tournament. For some time there also existed second division of the competition.

In the system of leagues of the Soviet football, the Football Championship of the Belarusian SSR had a status as competitions of "collective of physical culture" (amateurs, the other status was "teams of masters").

Winners of the competition qualified for "super cup" format competition known as the Season's Cup and was played between a winner of the republican championship and a republican cup holder.

== Unofficial competitions ==
Season	Champion	Runner-up	3rd Position
1922	Minsk	Bobruisk	Borisov
1923	no competitions		
1924	Minsk	Vitebsk	Borisov; Bobruisk
1925	no competitions		
1926	Bobruisk	Orsha	Minsk; Polotsk
1927	no competitions		
1928	Gomel	Polotsk	Minsk; Bobruisk
1929	no competitions		
1930	no competitions		
1931	no competitions		
1932	no competitions		
1933	Gomel	no data	

== Republican competitions among sports societies (First League) ==
The competitions were considered to be amateur. In Soviet Union officially all sports players were amateur athletes, however to differentiate level of teams, there were teams of sports societies and agencies (amateurs) and teams of masters (professionals).

At least since 1966 there were two all-republican divisions First League (Pershaja Liha) and Second League (Druhaja Liha).

In 1956, 1959 the competition was conducted among collective teams of regions (oblasts). In 1957, 1958 the competition was conducted among collective teams of cities.

Season	Champion	Runner-up	3rd Position
1934	Belarusian Military District	Dinamo Minsk	Trade Union Minsk
1935	Belarusian Military District	Dinamo Minsk	Spartak Minsk
1936	Belarusian Military District (Note: Possibly, it could have been the Minsk city team.)	Vitebsk	Bobruisk
1937	Dinamo Minsk	Spartak Minsk	Temp Minsk
1938	Dinamo Minsk	KIM Vitebsk (Note: Possible, KIM Minsk)	Spartak Minsk
1939	Dinamo Minsk	Dinamo Vitebsk	Spartak Minsk
1940	DKA Minsk (Note: DKA is an abbreviation for Dom Krasnoi Armii which means the House of the Red Army.)	Voskhod Minsk	Dinamo Minsk ‡
1941–1944	no competitions World War II		
1945	Dinamo Minsk	Dinamo Brest	Dinamo Grodno
1946	ODOKA Minsk (Note: ODOKA is an abbreviation for Okruzhnoi Dom Ofitserov Krasnoi Armii which means the District House of the Red Army Officers.) ‡	Dinamo-2 Minsk	Spartak Bobruisk
1947	Torpedo Minsk ‡	Spartak Bobruisk	Dinamo Minsk
1948	Traktor-MTZ Minsk	Lokomotiv Gomel	Spartak Bobruisk
1949	Torpedo-MTZ Minsk	Spartak Bobruisk	Dinamo Molodechno
1950	ODO Minsk ‡	Torpedo-MTZ Minsk	Spartak Bobruisk
1951	Dinamo Minsk	ODO Minsk ‡	Spartak Minsk
1952	ODO Minsk	Dinamo Minsk	Spartak Minsk ‡
1953	Spartak Minsk ‡	Iskra SKIF Minsk	Dinamo Pinsk
1954	ODO Pinsk	Zavod imeni Kirova Vitebsk	ODO Minsk (Note: Possibly, ODO Borisov (Borisov is a city in Minsk Oblast.))
1955	FShM Minsk	Zavod imeni Molotova Minsk	Dinamo Volkovysk
1956	Minsk-1 (Spartak Minsk)	Mogilev Oblast	Gomel Oblast
1957	Energiya Minsk (Note: Possibly, Sputnik Minsk ‡)	Bobruisk city team	Dinamo Volkovysk
1958	Spartak Bobruisk	Krasnoye Znamye Minsk	Gomel city team
1959	Minsk I	Grodno Oblast	Molodechno Oblast
1960	Sputnik Minsk ‡	Metallurg Mogilev	ODO Pinsk
1961	DO Volna Pinsk	Spartak Molodechno	Sputnik Minsk ‡
1962	Torpedo Minsk ‡	Spartak Molodechno	Sputnik Minsk
1963	Spartak Molodechno	Torpedo Minsk	Lokomotiv Brest
1964	SKA Minsk	Gvardeets Uručča (Note: or Gvardeets Minsk ‡)	Volna Pinsk
1965	SKA Minsk (Note: SKA Minsk Oblast)	Khimik Grodno	Naroch Molodechno
1966	Torpedo Minsk	Sputnik Minsk ‡	SKA Minsk
1967	Torpedo Minsk	Sputnik Minsk ‡	Khimik Grodno
1968	Sputnik Minsk	Torpedo Minsk ‡	Metallurg Mogilev
1969	Torpedo Minsk	Impuls Brest	Gvardeets Uruchie
1970	Torpedo Zhodino	Sputnik Minsk ‡	Stroitel Bobruisk
1971	Torpedo Zhodino ‡	Stroitel Bobruisk	Impuls Brest
1972	Stroitel Bobruisk	Torpedo Zhodino ‡	Torpedo Minsk
1973	Stroitel Bobruisk	Sputnik Minsk	Motor Minsk
1974	BATE Borisov	Motor Minsk	SKA Minsk
1975	Dinamo-2 Minsk	Stroitel Bobruisk ‡	Torpedo Zhodino
1976	BATE Borisov ‡	Berezina Bobruisk	Torpedo Minsk
1977	Sputnik Minsk	Dinamo-2 Minsk	Burevestnik Minsk
1978	Shinnik Bobruisk	BATE Borisov	Temp Orsha
1979	BATE Borisov	Burevestnik Minsk	Torpedo Mogilev
1980	Torpedo Zhodino	Shinnik Bobruisk	Burevestnik Minsk ‡
1981	Torpedo Zhodino ‡	Impuls Brest (Note: or Gomel)	Metallist Molodechno
1982	Torpedo Mogilev	Burevestnik Minsk	Torpedo Zhodino ‡
1983	Obuvshchik Lida	Torpedo Minsk ‡	Orbita Minsk
1984	Orbita Minsk ‡	Torpedo Mogilev	Traktor Minsk
1985	Obuvshchik Lida	Torpedo Zhodino	Traktor Minsk
1986	Obuvshchik Lida	Shinnik Bobruisk	Sputnik Minsk
1987	Shinnik Bobruisk	Sputnik Minsk	Obuvshchik Lida
1988	Sputnik Minsk	Shakhter Soligorsk ‡	Obuvshchik Lida
1989	Obuvshchik Lida	Sputnik Minsk ‡	Shakhter Soligorsk
1990	Sputnik Minsk	Shakhter Soligorsk	Torpedo Minsk
1991	Metallurg Molodechno ‡	Torpedo Mogilev	SKB (Note: SKB is abbreviation for Special Design Bureau (Spetsialnoe Konstruktorskoe Biuro).) Vitebsk

‡ – winners of the Football Cup of the Belarusian SSR

=== Football Championship of the Belarusian SSR – Second League laureates ===
Season	Group	Champion	Runner-up	3rd Position
1966	no data			
1967	no data			
1968	no data			
1969	no data			
1970	1	Obuvshchik Lida	Motor Minsk	Traktor Minsk
1970	2	Start Orsha	Temp Baran	Trud Gomel
1971	1	DOK Gomel	Trud Gomel	Neftianik Novopolotsk
1971	2	Pripiat Minsk	SKA Minsk	Shakhter Soligorsk
1972	1	SKA Minsk	Stankostroitel	Lokomotiv Osipovichi
1972	2	Obuvshchik Lida	Selena Molodechno	Metallist Dzerzhinsk
1973	1	Selena Molodechno	Orbita Minsk	Shakhter Soligorsk
1973	2	BATE Borisov	DSK Minsk	Temp Baran
1974–1988	no competitions / no data			
1989	1	KIM Vitebsk	Torpedo Mogilev	Almaz Gomel
1989	2	Metallurg Molodechno	Traktor Minsk	Olimp Grodno
1990	1	Traktor Bobruisk	Berezina Borisov	Vedrich Rechitsa
1990	2	Veras Grodno	Neman Mosty	Stankostroitel Smorhon
1991	1	Vedrich Rechitsa	Kolos Ustie	Shinnik Bobruisk
1991	2	Luch Minsk	Kommunalnik Pinsk	Niva Samokhvalovichi

== List of all champions ==
=== Performance by club ===
Club	Winners	Runners-up	Winning seasons	Notes
SKA Minsk	8	1	1934, 1935, 1940, 1946, 1950, 1952, 1964, 1965	Belarusian Military District, DKA Minsk, ODOKA
Dinamo Minsk	6	5	1937, 1938, 1939, 1945, 1951, 1975	(including Dinamo-2 Minsk)
Sputnik Minsk	5	6	1960, 1968, 1977, 1988, 1990	
Torpedo Minsk	5	3	1947, 1962, 1966, 1967, 1969	
Torpedo Zhodino	4	2	1970, 1971, 1980, 1981	
Obuvshchik Lida	4	0	1983, 1985, 1986, 1989	
BATE Borisov	3	1	1974, 1976, 1979	
Minsk-1 city team	3	0	1936, 1956, 1959	Minsk city team
Shinnik Bobruisk	2	3	1978, 1987	Berezina Bobruisk
Stroitel Bobruisk	2	2	1972, 1973	
MTZ Minsk	2	1	1948, 1949	Torpedo-MTZ Minsk, Traktor-MTZ Minsk
DO Volna Pinsk	2	0	1954, 1961	DO Pinsk
Spartak Bobruisk	1	2	1958	
Spartak Molodechno	1	2	1963	
Torpedo Mogilev	1	2	1982	
Spartak Minsk	1	1	1953	
FShM Minsk	1	0	1955	
Energiya Minsk	1	0	1957	
Orbita Minsk	1	0	1984	
Metallurg Molodechno	1	0	1991	
Impuls Brest	0	2		
Burevestnik Minsk	0	2		
Shakhter Soligorsk	0	2		
Vitebsk city team	0	1		
KIM Vitebsk	0	1		
Dinamo Vitebsk	0	1		
Voskhod Minsk	0	1		
Dinamo Brest	0	1		
Dinamo-2 Minsk	0	1		
Lokomotiv Gomel	0	1		
Iskra SKIF Minsk	0	1		
Zavod imeni Kirova Vitebsk	0	1		
Zavod imeni Molotova Minsk	0	1		
Mogilev Oblast team	0	1		
Bobruisk city team	0	1		
Krasnoje Znamje Minsk	0	1		
Grodno Oblast team	0	1		
Metallurg Mogilev	0	1		
Gvardeets Uruchie	0	1		
Khimik Grodno	0	1		
Motor Minsk	0	1		

== Qualification to All-Union competition ==
Before the World War II, the Byelorussian Soviet Socialist Republic was rarely represented at the Soviet competitions among teams of masters. There were Dinamo Minsk in 1937 (undetermined conditions), Spartak Minsk in 1939 (placed 3rd at republican competitions), and one more time Dinamo Minsk in 1940 (champion of the BSSR).

Following the war, Belarusian teams rejoined the all-Union competition in 1945 by the Belarusian Dinamo Minsk which continued to play among teams of masters until dissolution of the Soviet Union in 1991. In 1947 the competitions among teams of masters joined the 1946 Belarusian champion ODOKA Minsk that entered the 1947 Vtoraya Gruppa playing as DO Minsk (1947–1949).

In 1948 the all-Union competitions joined Spartak Minsk (1948–1949).

In 1950 took place reorganization of the Soviet football competitions and most Belarusian clubs were removed from competitions except for Dinamo.

In 1954 the all-Union competitions joined Pischevik Minsk (1954).

In 1957 the all-Union competitions joined Urozhai Minsk (1957–1960).

In 1960 the all-Union competitions joined Spartak (Lokomotiv) Gomel (1960–1991), Dvina (Krasnoje Znamja) Vitebsk (1960–1991), Spartak (Khimik) Mogilev (1960–1991), Dinamo (Spartak) Brest (1960–1991).

In 1961 the all-Union competitions joined Bobruisk (1961).

In 1962 the all-Union competitions joined SKA Minsk (1962–1963).

In 1964 the all-Union competitions joined Neman Grodno (1964–1991).

In 1963 Dvina, Spartak Mg, Spartak Br, SKA played in the Union republics Class B.

In 1964–1965 Dvina, Spartak Mg, Spartak Br, and Neman played in the Ukrainian Class B. In 1970 Spartak Br, Gomselmash and Neman played in Ukrainian competitions of Class A Second Group.

== See also ==
- Belarusian Premier League
- Belarusian First League
- FC Dinamo Minsk
