= FC SKA Minsk =

Soviet football club

SKA Minsk
- Full name: FC SKA Minsk
- Founded: 1934
- Dissolved: 1976

FC SKA Minsk was a Belarusian main army football club of the Belorussian Military District, playing in Minsk.

The club became the first champion of the Byelorussian Soviet Socialist Republic at regular football competitions that are played since 1934. It made its first appearance at the all-Union level (among teams of masters) in 1947 in the 1947 Vtoraya Gruppa placing last in its group. They played in the lower Soviet leagues until 1963, and then in the Belarusian SSR league until their dissolution in 1976.

== Name changes ==
- -1954: DO Minsk (or ODOKA Minsk)
- 1955–57: ODO Minsk
- 1958–59: SKVO Minsk
- 1960–76: SKA Minsk

== Honours ==
- Football Championship of the Belarusian SSR
  - Winners (8, record): 1934, 1935, 1940, 1946, 1950, 1952, 1964, 1965
  - Runners-up (1): 1951
