= Tallinna JK Dünamo =

Estonian football club

Tallinna Dünamo
- Full name: Tallinna JK Dünamo
- Founded: 1940
- Ground: Wismari jalgpallistaadion, Tallinn
- Manager: Viktor Nescheretnyi
- League: III Liiga North
- 2021: III Liiga North, 11th
Home colours	Away colours

Tallinna JK Dünamo is an Estonian football club based in Tallinn. As of 2021, the club played in the III Liiga, the fifth level of Estonian Football, having last played in the Estonian top tier in 2005.

== History ==
The club was formed in 1940 and won ten Estonian SSR championships. In 2004, the club made an unexpected return to Estonian top flight Meistriliiga, when Tervis turned out to be ineligible for promotion.

Originally, the club also played bandy, becoming Estonian champions of this sport in 1941.

== Achievements ==
- Estonian SSR Championship: (10)

1945, 1947, 1949, 1950, 1953, 1954, 1978, 1980, 1981, 1983.

- Estonian SSR Cup: (7)

1946, 1947, 1949, 1953, 1972*, 1979, 1983.

*As "Kopli Dünamo"

== Statistics ==
=== League and Cup ===
Season	Division	Pos	Teams	Pld	W	D	L	GF	GA	GD	Pts	Top Goalscorer	Estonian Cup	Notes
1998	II liiga N/E	3	6	10	7	0	3	25	18	+7	21	Vitali Kosterev and Arvydas Rukšenas (5)		
1999	II liiga N/E	1	6	20	12	5	3	45	16	+29	41	Paul Kirsipuu (11)		
2000	Esiliiga	5	8	28	11	2	15	61	72	−11	35	Andrei Kossarev (12)		
2001	II liiga N/E	5	6	20	5	2	13	36	55	−19	17	Andrei Semko and Vitali Kosterev (7)		
2002	III liiga N	1	10	18	15	2	1	62	14	+48	47	Urmas Sorga and Vitali Kosterev (11)		
2003	II liiga N/E	1	8	28	21	4	3	80	24	+56	67	Andrei Semko and Maksim Židkov (17)		
2004	Esiliiga	4	8	28	12	2	14	49	66	−18	38	Konstantin Butajev (17)		
2005	Meistriliiga	10	10	36	3	3	30	28	157	−129	12	Konstantin Butajev (10)		
2006	Esiliiga	9	10	36	7	8	21	43	85	−42	29	Pavel Apalinski (10)		
2007	II liiga N/E	11	14	26	6	9	11	41	51	−10	27	Anatoli Božko (9)		
2008	II liiga N/E	9	14	26	10	3	13	47	40	+7	33	Paul Kirsipuu (11)	–	
2009	II liiga N/E	2	14	26	17	4	5	62	41	+21	55	Ilja Monakov (21)	–	
2010	II liiga N/E	6	13	24	9	5	10	37	40	−3	32	Anatoli Božko and Maksim Židkov (8)	–	
2011	II liiga N/E	8	14	26	11	3	12	49	64	−15	36	Maksim Židkov (9)	–	
2012	II liiga N/E	6	14	26	12	5	9	58	46	+12	41	Maksim Židkov (16)	–	
2013	Esiliiga B	8	10	36	9	4	23	42	86	−44	31	Maksim Židkov (10)	Second Round	
2014	II liiga N/E	6	14	26	12	3	11	51	45	+6	39	Emil Guseinov (16)	First Round	
2015	II liiga N/E	9	14	26	8	6	12	42	52	−10	30	Maksim Židkov (9)	–	
2016	II liiga N/E	7	14	26	11	4	10	48	47	+1	37	Temitayo Doherty (19)	–	
2017	II liiga N/E	6	14	26	13	5	8	57	33	+24	44	Arome Julius Onogu (15)	–	
2018	III liiga N	9	12	22	8	3	11	37	50	–13	27	Victor Ohireme Ihonde (9)	–	
2019	III liiga N	10	12	22	6	2	14	42	70	–28	20	Temitayo Doherty (11)	–	
2020	III liiga N	8	12	22	9	2	11	54	68	–14	29	Vitali Ivahnenko (11)	–	
