= Uno Piir =

Estonian footballer and coach (1929–2025)

Personal information
- Date of birth: 13 November 1929
- Place of birth: Tallinn, Estonia
- Date of death: 4 May 2025 (aged 95)
- Position: Midfielder

Senior career*
Years	Team	Apps	(Gls)
1949–1950	Dünamo		
1954–1955	Tallinna Kalev		

Managerial career
- 1960–1961: Tallinna Kalev (assistant manager)
- 1962–1989: Norma
- 1990: VaKP
- 1992–1993: Estonia
- 1995–1996: Tallinna Sadam
- 1997–2004: Nõmme Kalju
- * Club domestic league appearances and goals

Uno Piir (12 November 1929 – 4 May 2025) was an Estonian football coach and player. He was the first manager of the Estonia national team after the Soviet occupation. In 1997, together with Anton Siht and Värner Lootsmann, he re-established the Nõmme Kalju football club and coached it until 2004. On 4 May 2025, Piir died at the age of 95.

== Honours ==
=== Player ===
Dünamo Tallinn

- Estonian SSR Football Championship: 1949, 1950
- Estonian Cup: 1949

Kalev Tallinn

- Estonian SSR Football Championship: 1955

=== Manager ===
Norma Tallinn

- Estonian SSR Football Championship: 1964, 1967, 1970, 1979, 1988
- Estonian Cup: 1962, 1965, 1971, 1973, 1974 ja 1989

Tallinna Sadam

- Estonian Cup: 1995–96
