= Meistriliiga =

Estonian highest league of football

- Founded: 1992; 34 years ago
- Country: Estonia
- Confederation: UEFA
- Number of clubs: 10
- Level on pyramid: 1
- Relegation to: Esiliiga
- Domestic cup(s): Estonian Cup; Estonian Supercup
- International cup(s): UEFA Champions League; UEFA Conference League
- Current champions: FCI Levadia (12th title) (2026)
- Most championships: Flora (16 titles)
- Most appearances: Andre Frolov (556)
- Top scorer: Maksim Gruznov (304)
- Broadcasters: ETV2, ETV+, soccernet.ee
- Website: jalgpall.ee/liiga
- Current: 2026 Meistriliiga

Meistriliiga (pronounced [ˈmeistriliːɡ̊ɑː]), officially known as A. Le Coq Premium Liiga for sponsorship reasons, and commonly known as the Premium Liiga, is the highest division of the Estonian Football Association annual football championship. The league was founded in 1992, and was initially semi-professional with amateur clubs allowed to compete. With the help of solidarity mechanisms, the league is fully professional since the 2020 season.

As in most countries with low temperatures in winter, the season starts in March and ends in November. Meistriliiga consists of ten clubs, all teams play each other four times.

After each season, the bottom team is relegated to the Esiliiga, the Estonian second division league. The second last team plays a two-legged play-off with the second team in the Esiliiga for a place in the Meistriliiga.

== History ==
=== Origins ===
The first Estonian Football Championship title was played out in 1921 and was won by Sport, who later went on to lift nine league titles and was the most successful Estonian football club during the country's first period of independence. The championship was initially played as a knock-out tournament, before league format was adapted in 1929. During the last 1939–40 season, Tartu Olümpia became the first club outside of capital city Tallinn to be crowned the Estonian champions, and have remained to be the only non-Tallinn club to do so until present day.

Estonia lost its independence through Soviet occupation in World War II, after which former clubs were forced to dissolve and Estonian SSR Championship was established. During the occupation, native Estonians started to desist from practicing football and the local championships were mostly played by teams consisting of local Russians.

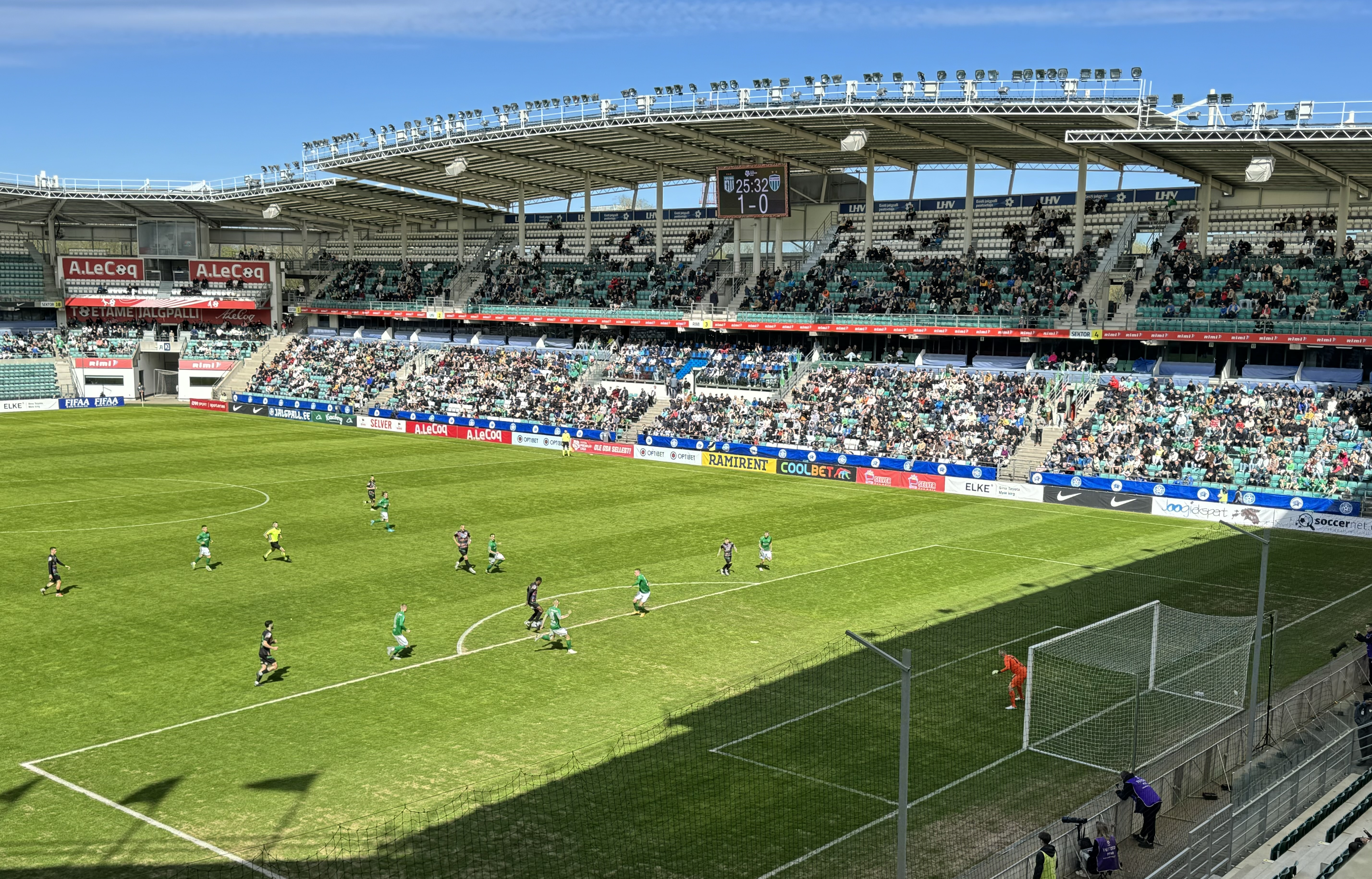
Tallinn derby (Flora vs. Levadia) is the most attended fixture in the league

=== Meistriliiga ===
Estonia restored its independence in 1991 and in the following year, Meistriliiga was established. After 52 years, Estonian clubs could once again play for the Estonian Football Championship title. The number of teams participating in the league varied from 8 to 14 until 2005, since then the league has been played with 10 teams. First live TV broadcasts began in 2008, and in 2020, first league matches were broadcast on foreign TV channels.

In February 2013, A. Le Coq, an Estonian brewery company, signed a five-year cooperation agreement with the Estonian Football Association, which included Meistriliiga naming rights. Since then, the league has been known as the Premium Liiga.

In 2020, the league became fully professional as the Estonian Football Association began financially supporting clubs that do not qualify for European spots.

Premium Liiga started using video assistant referee (VAR) from 2023.

== 2026 season ==
The following 10 clubs will compete in the 2026 Meistriliiga.

Club	Position in 2025	First season in Meistriliiga	Seasons in Meistriliiga	First season of current spell	Number of seasons of current spell	Titles	Last title
FCI Levadia^{c}	2nd	1999	28	1999	28	11	2024
Flora^{a, b, c}	1st	1992	36	1992	36	16	2025
Harju	7th	2023	3	2025	2	0	–
Kuressaare	9th	2000	19	2018	9	0	–
Narva Trans^{a, b, c}	5th	1992	36	1992	36	0	–
Nõmme Kalju^{c}	3rd	2008	19	2008	19	2	2018
Nõmme United	1st (EL)	2024	2	2026	1	0	–
Paide Linnameeskond^{c}	4th	2009	18	2009	18	0	–
Tammeka^{c}	8th	2005	22	2005	22	0	–
Vaprus	6th	2006	11	2021	6	0	–

^{a} = Founding member of the Meistriliiga
^{b} = Played in every Meistriliiga season
^{c} = Never been relegated from the Meistriliiga

Location of clubs in Estonia for the 2026 Meistriliiga season
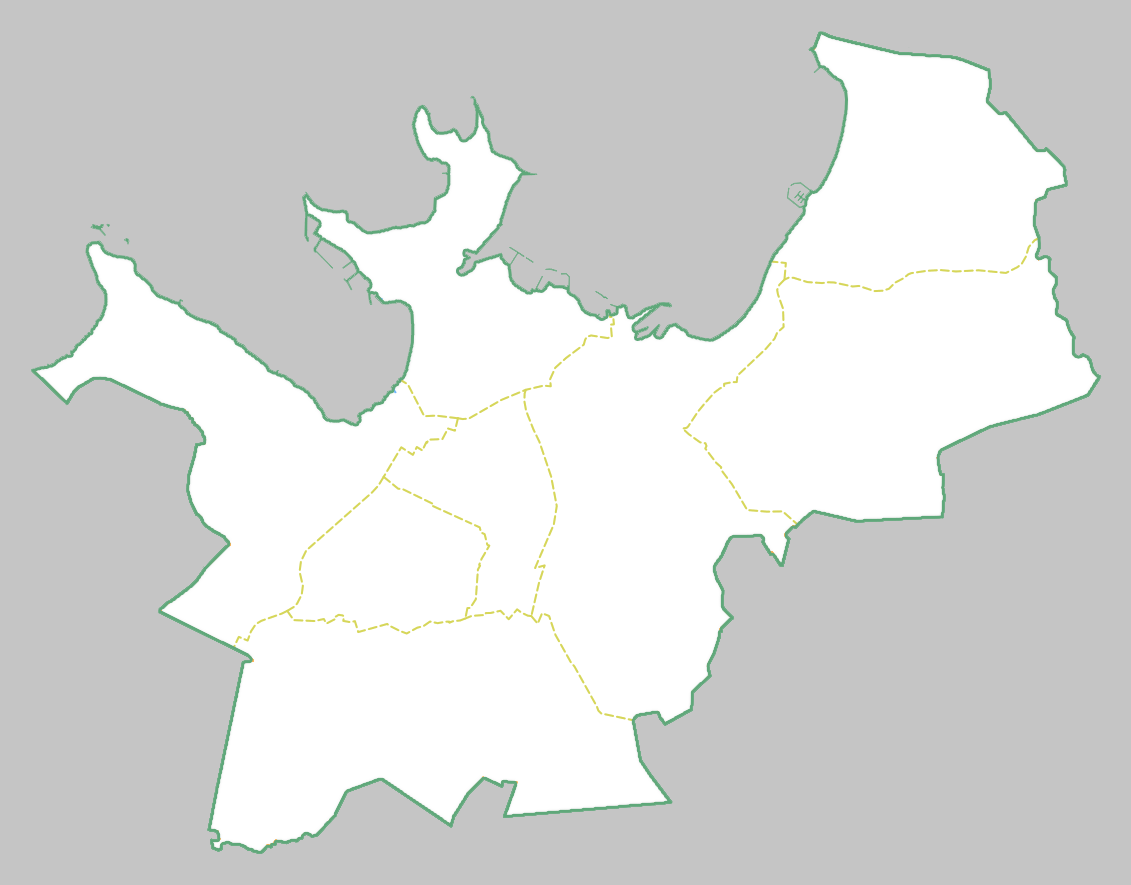
Location of clubs in Tallinn for the 2026 Meistriliiga season

== Champions ==
Season	Champions	Runners-up	Third place	Top goalscorer	Goals
1992	Norma	Eesti Põlevkivi	TVMV	Sergei Bragin (Norma)	18
1992–93	Norma (2)	Flora	Nikol	Sergei Bragin (Norma)	27
1993–94	Flora	Norma	Nikol	Maksim Gruznov (Narva Trans/Tevalte)	21
1994–95	Flora (2)	Lantana-Marlekor	Narva Trans	Serhiy Morozov (Lantana-Marlekor)	25
1995–96	Lantana	Flora	Tevalte-Marlekor	Lembit Rajala (Flora)	16
1996–97	Lantana (2)	Flora	Tallinna Sadam	Sergei Bragin (Lantana)	18
1997–98	Flora (3)	Tallinna Sadam	Lantana	Konstantin Kolbassenko (Tallinna Sadam)	18
1998	Flora (4)	Tallinna Sadam	Lantana	Konstantin Kolbassenko (Tallinna Sadam)	13
1999	Levadia	Tulevik	Flora	Toomas Krõm (Levadia)	19
2000	Levadia (2)	Flora	TVMK	Egidijus Juška (TVMK); Toomas Krõm (Levadia)	24
2001	Flora (5)	TVMK	Levadia	Maksim Gruznov (Narva Trans)	37
2002	Flora (6)	Levadia	TVMK	Andrei Krõlov (TVMK)	37
2003	Flora (7)	TVMK	Levadia	Tor Henning Hamre (Flora)	39
2004	Levadia (3)	TVMK	Flora	Vjatšeslav Zahovaiko (Flora)	28
2005	TVMK	Levadia	Narva Trans	Tarmo Neemelo (TVMK)	41
2006	Levadia (4)	Narva Trans	Flora	Maksim Gruznov (Narva Trans)	31
2007	Levadia (5)	Flora	TVMK	Dmitri Lipartov (Narva Trans)	30
2008	Levadia (6)	Flora	Narva Trans	Ingemar Teever (Nõmme Kalju)	23
2009	Levadia (7)	Sillamäe Kalev	Narva Trans	Vitali Gussev (Levadia)	26
2010	Flora (8)	Levadia	Narva Trans	Sander Post (Flora)	24
2011	Flora (9)	Nõmme Kalju	Narva Trans	Aleksandrs Čekulajevs (Narva Trans)	46
2012	Nõmme Kalju	Levadia	Flora	Vladislav Ivanov (Sillamäe Kalev/Narva Trans)	23
2013	Levadia (8)	Nõmme Kalju	Sillamäe Kalev	Vladimir Voskoboinikov (Nõmme Kalju)	23
2014	Levadia (9)	Sillamäe Kalev	Flora	Yevgeni Kabaev (Sillamäe Kalev)	36
2015	Flora (10)	Levadia	Nõmme Kalju	Ingemar Teever (Levadia)	24
2016	Infonet	Levadia	Nõmme Kalju	Yevgeni Kabaev (Sillamäe Kalev)	25
2017	Flora (11)	Levadia	Nõmme Kalju	Albert Prosa (FCI Tallinn); Rauno Sappinen (Flora)	27
2018	Nõmme Kalju (2)	FCI Levadia	Flora	Liliu (Nõmme Kalju)	31
2019	Flora (12)	FCI Levadia	Nõmme Kalju	Erik Sorga (Flora)	31
2020	Flora (13)	Paide Linnameeskond	FCI Levadia	Rauno Sappinen (Flora)	26
2021	FCI Levadia (10)	Flora	Paide Linnameeskond	Henri Anier (Paide Linnameeskond)	26
2022	Flora (14)	FCI Levadia	Paide Linnameeskond	Zakaria Beglarishvili (FCI Levadia)	21
2023	Flora (15)	FCI Levadia	Tallinna Kalev	Tristan Koskor (Narva Trans)	16
2024	FCI Levadia (11)	Nõmme Kalju	Paide Linnameeskond	Alex Matthias Tamm (Nõmme Kalju)	28
2025	Flora (16)	FCI Levadia	Nõmme Kalju	Rauno Sappinen (Flora)	21
2026	FCI Levadia (12)	Paide Linnameeskond	Flora	Wendell (FCI Levadia)	20

=== Total titles won ===
Club	Winners	Runners-up	Winning seasons
Flora	16	7	1993–94, 1994–95, 1997–98, 1998, 2001, 2002, 2003, 2010, 2011, 2015, 2017, 2019, 2020, 2022, 2023, 2025
FCI Levadia	12	12	1999, 2000, 2004, 2006, 2007, 2008, 2009, 2013, 2014, 2021, 2024, 2026
Nõmme Kalju	2	3	2012, 2018
Norma	2	1	1992, 1992–93
Lantana	2	1	1995–96, 1996–97
TVMK	1	3	2005
FCI Tallinn	1	0	2016

Titles won by club (%)
1. Flora – 16 (44.4%)
2. FCI Levadia – 12 (33.3%)
3. Nõmme Kalju – 2 (5.56%)
4. Norma - 2 (5.56%)
5. Lantana – 2 (5.56%)
6. TVMK – 1 (2.78%)
7. FCI Tallinn - 1 (2.78%)

== All-time Meistriliiga table ==
The table is a cumulative record of all match results, points and goals of every team that has played in the Meistriliiga since its inception in 1992. The table that follows is accurate as of the end of the 2022 season. Teams in bold play in the Meistriliiga 2023 season. Numbers in bold are the record (highest) numbers in each column.

In this ranking 3 points are awarded for a win, 1 for a draw, and 0 for a loss, although Meistriliiga awarded 2 points for a win until the 1994–95 season. Championship matches, relegation matches and relegation tournament matches involving clubs of lower leagues are not counted. In 1992 Preliminary Round matches were played in two groups. The results of the matches played between teams in same group were taken to second round, thus counted twice, in this table these results are counted once.

The table is sorted by all-time points.

Pos.	Club	Seasons	Titles	Pld	W	D	L	GF	GA	GD	Pts	PPG
**1**	**Flora**	**32**	**14**	969	**682**	165	122	**2577**	768	**1809**	**2211**	2.28
2	**Levadia^{1}**	24	10	805	578	143	84	2140	591	1549	1877	**2.33**
3	**Narva Trans**	**32**	0	**970**	434	**190**	346	1742	**1341**	401	1492	1.54
4	**Nõmme Kalju**	15	2	530	313	111	106	1141	502	639	1050	1.98
5	TVMK^{2}	17	1	452	255	82	115	1073	516	557	847	1.87
6	Tulevik^{3}	22	0	655	187	112	**356**	792	1283	−491	673	1.02
7	**Paide Linnameeskond**	14	0	494	188	87	219	734	845	−111	651	1.32
8	**Tammeka**	17	0	634	176	117	341	767	1235	−468	645	1.02
9	Sillamäe Kalev	13	0	413	183	65	165	741	681	60	614	1.49
10	**Kuressaare**	15	0	504	88	75	341	427	1283	−856	339	0.67
11	FCI Tallinn^{9}	5	1	180	90	41	49	343	212	131	311	1.73
12	**Tallinna Kalev**	10	0	354	68	55	231	341	860	−519	259	0.73
13	Lantana^{5}	7	2	160	88	38	34	341	153	188	302	1.89
14	Tallinna Sadam	6	0	132	67	19	46	271	168	103	220	1.67
15	Eesti Põlevkivi	9	0	162	50	40	72	224	276	−52	190	1.17
16	Norma	4	2	78	49	7	22	223	111	112	154	1.97
17	Merkuur^{4}	6	0	153	41	28	84	204	404	−200	151	0.99
18	**Vaprus**	7	0	246	35	21	190	235	760	−525	126	0.51
19	Legion	3	0	98	25	22	51	109	174	−65	93	0.95
20	Lootus^{6}	5	0	148	22	19	107	104	394	−290	85	0.57
21	Warrior	5	0	156	21	18	117	120	425	−305	81	0.52
22	Levadia II^{1}	3	0	84	20	14	50	106	211	−105	74	0.88
23	Lelle	4	0	80	16	19	45	72	155	−83	67	0.84
24	Dünamo	4	0	89	16	11	62	92	277	−185	59	0.66
25	DAG^{7}	4	0	68	16	9	43	85	199	−114	57	0.84
26	Viljandi	2	0	72	14	14	44	70	157	−87	56	0.78
27	Vigri	2	0	32	16	7	9	81	55	26	55	1.72
28	Pärnu Linnameeskond	2	0	72	11	10	51	62	185	−123	43	0.60
29	Tervis Pärnu	2	0	46	11	5	30	38	92	−54	38	0.83
30	Keemik	2	0	31	10	6	15	41	72	−31	36	1.16
31	Ajax	3	0	108	7	13	88	60	449	−389	34	0.31
32	Pärnu^{8}	3	0	38	5	5	28	36	120	−84	20	0.53
33	Lokomotiv	1	0	36	4	6	26	35	115	−80	18	0.50
34	Maardu Linnameeskond	1	0	36	4	5	27	30	118	−88	17	0.47
35	Pärnu Levadia	1	0	28	1	5	22	19	96	−77	8	0.29
36	Tarvas	1	0	36	0	3	33	15	113	−98	3	0.09
37	Vall	1	0	14	0	1	13	9	44	−35	1	0.07
38	Maardu	1	0	9	0	0	9	6	59	−53	0	0

Notes

- Note 1: 1999–2003 FC Levadia Maardu, 2004– FC Levadia. Not to be confused with FC Levadia Tallinn 2001–2003 a separate team owned by the steel company Levadia. In 2004 the clubs were merged FC Levadia Maardu were moved to Tallinn and became FC Levadia, former FC Levadia Tallinn became their reserves as FC Levadia II.
- Note 2: 1992 TVMV, 1992-1994 Nikol, 1995–1996 Tevalte-Marlekor, 1996–1997 Marlekor, 1997–2008 TVMK
- Note 3: 1992 Viljandi JK, 1993– Viljandi Tulevik
- Note 4: 1992–2005 Merkuur, 2006 Maag
- Note 5: 1993–1994 Tevalte, 1995–1999 Lantana
- Note 6: 2000–2003 Kohtla-Järve Lootus, 2004 Alutaguse Lootus, 2005–2012 Kohtla-Järve Lootus, then merged and became Kohtla-Järve JK Järve
- Note 7: 1992 Tartu Kalev, 1992–1994 EsDAG, 1994– DAG
- Note 8: 1992 Pärnu JK, 1994–1996 PJK Kalev
- Note 9: 2011–2016 Infonet, 2017 FCI Tallinn

== Records ==
All as of end of 2026 season if not stated otherwise.

=== Club records ===
- Most seasons in the Meistriliiga: 36 – Flora and Narva Trans (all seasons, 1992–present)
- Most consecutive seasons in the Meistriliiga: 36 – Flora and Narva Trans (all seasons, 1992–present)
- Most titles: 16 – Flora
- Most consecutive titles: 4 – Levadia (2006–2009)
- Biggest title-winning margin: 27 points – 2026; FCI Levadia (91 points) over Paide Linnameeskond (64 points)
- Smallest title-winning margin: 0 points – 1993–94; Flora and Norma both finished on 36 points, Flora won the title in a championship play-off match 5–2.
- Most points in a season: 97 – Levadia (2009), Flora (2022)
- Fewest points in a season: 0 – Maardu (1992)
- Most wins in a season: 31 – Levadia (2009, 36 games), Flora (2022, 36 games)
- Fewest wins in a season: 0 – PJK/Kalev (1995–96, 14 games), Vall (1996–97, 14 games), Lelle (1998, 14 games), Ajax (2011, 36 games), Tarvas (2016, 36 games)
- Most consecutive wins: 17 – Norma (15 May 1992 – 2 October 1993)
- Most defeats in a season: 33 – Tarvas (2016, 36 games)
- Most consecutive matches undefeated: 61 – Levadia (10 May 2008 – 7 November 2009)
- Most goals scored in a season: 138 – TVMK (2005)
- Most goals per game in a season: 4.636 – Norma (1992–93, 102 goals in 22 games)
- Fewest goals scored in a season: 11 – Sillamäe Kalev (1993–94, 22 games), Valga (2000, 28 games), Kuressaare (2003, 28 games), Lootus (2004, 28 games), Ajax (2011, 36 games)
- Fewest goals per game in a season: 0.306 – Ajax (2011, 11 goals in 36 games)
- Most goals conceded in a season: 192 – Ajax (2011, 36 games)
- Fewest goals conceded in a season: 16 – Levadia (2010, 36 games)
- Most clean sheets in one season: 24 – Levadia (2014)
- Most consecutive clean sheets: 13 – Levadia (2014)
- Biggest win: Tevalte 24–0 Sillamäe Kalev (27 May 1994)
- Most hat-tricks in a season: 9 – Norma (1992–93)

=== Player records ===
As of 7 November 2026. Active players in bold.

Most appearances
Rank	Player	Games	Goals
1	**Andre Frolov**	556	75
2	**Sander Sinilaid**	526	40
3	Andrei Kalimullin	517	22
4	Stanislav Kitto	515	55
5	**Rauno Alliku**	494	126
5	Maksim Gruznov	494	304
7	Konstantin Nahk	481	153
8	Markus Jürgenson	472	63
9	**Maksim Podholjuzin**	468	14
10	Tarmo Neemelo	450	196

Most goals
Rank	Player	Goals	Games	Average
1	Maksim Gruznov	304	494	0.62
2	Vjatšeslav Zahovaiko	211	309	0.68
3	Tarmo Neemelo	196	450	0.44
4	Andrei Krõlov	162	287	0.56
4	Vitali Leitan	162	418	0.39
6	**Zakaria Beglarishvili**	158	378	0.42
7	Ingemar Teever	157	296	0.53
8	Dmitri Lipartov	153	333	0.46
8	Konstantin Nahk	153	481	0.32
10	Rauno Sappinen	149	255	0.58

- Oldest player: Boriss Dugan – 51 years and 153 days (for Ajax v. Tammeka, 5 November 2011)
- Youngest player: Patrik Kristal – 14 years and 245 days (for FCI Levadia v. Tammeka, 15 July 2022)
- Oldest goalscorer: Sergei Zamogilnõi – 43 years and 16 days (for Eesti Põlevkivi v. Vall, 15 September 1996)
- Youngest goalscorer: Martin Vetkal – 15 years and 261 days (for Tallinna Kalev v. Tulevik, 9 November 2019)
- Most goals in a season: 46 – Aleksandrs Čekulajevs (for Narva Trans, 2011)
- Most goals in a match: 10 – Anatoli Novožilov (for Tevalte v. Sillamäe Kalev, 27 May 1994)
- Most consecutive matches scored in: 15 – Tor Henning Hamre (for Flora, 2003)
- Most hat-tricks: 22 – Vjatšeslav Zahovaiko
- Youngest player to score a hat-trick: Marten-Chris Paalberg – 16 years and 343 days (for Vaprus v. Tammeka, 16 September 2025)
- Most goals from the penalty spot: 55 – Konstantin Nahk
- Fastest goal: 7 seconds – Promise David (for Nõmme Kalju v. Nõmme United, 28 May 2024)
- Fastest own goal: 5 seconds – Jaanis Kriska (for Levadia v. Kuressaare, 12 September 2009)
- Fastest hat-trick: 5 minutes – Vjatšeslav Zahovaiko (for Flora v. Lootus, 18 October 2004)
- Most clean sheets in one season: 24 – Roman Smishko (for Levadia, 2014)
- Longest consecutive run without conceding a goal: 13 games (1,281 minutes) – Roman Smishko (for Levadia, 5 April 2014 – 25 July 2014)
- Most Meistriliiga winner's medals: 9 – Rauno Alliku (2010, 2011, 2015, 2017, 2019, 2020, 2022, 2023, 2025)
- Most Player of the Year awards: 4 – Rauno Sappinen (2017, 2020, 2021, 2025)

== Estonian champions 1921–1940 ==
The Estonian Football Championship was first established in 1921 and the title for the Estonian champion was played out on 19 occasions, before Estonia was occupied by the Soviet Union in 1940. The league was named A-klass from 1921 to 1923, I klass from 1924 to 1926 and Liiduklass from 1927 until 1940.

- 1921 – **Sport Tallinn** (1)
- 1922 – Sport Tallinn (2)
- 1923 – **Kalev Tallinn** (1)
- 1924 – Sport Tallinn (3)
- 1925 – Sport Tallinn (4)
- 1926 – **Tallinna Jalgpalli Klubi** (1)
- 1927 – Sport Tallinn (5)
- 1928 – Tallinna Jalgpalli Klubi (2)
- 1929 – Sport Tallinn (6)
- 1930 – Kalev Tallinn (2)
- 1931 – Sport Tallinn (7)
- 1932 – Sport Tallinn (8)
- 1933 – Sport Tallinn (9)
- 1934 – **Estonia Tallinn** (1)
- 1935 – Estonia Tallinn (2)
- 1936 – Estonia Tallinn (3)
- 1937–38 – Estonia Tallinn (4)
- 1938–39 – Estonia Tallinn (5)
- 1939–40 – **Olümpia Tartu** (1)
- 1941 – Not finished
- 1942 – **PSR Tartu** (1) (unofficial)
- 1943 – Estonia Tallinn (6) (unofficial)
- 1944 – Not finished

Bold indicates club's first championship victory.

=== Total titles won ===
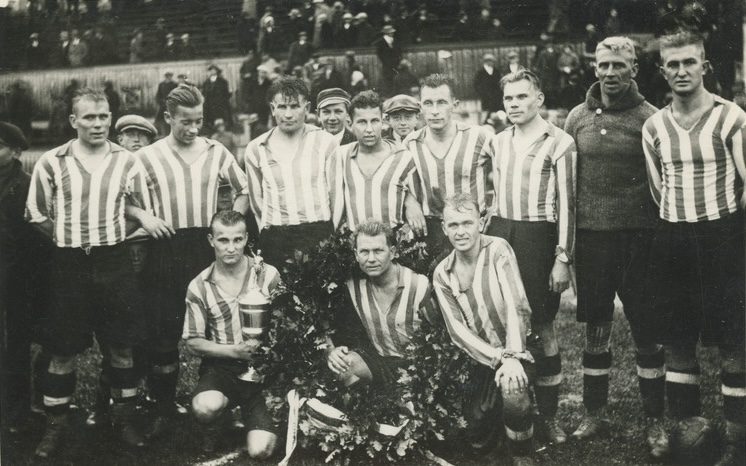
Sport was the most successful Estonian football club before WWII

Club	Winners	Runners-up	Winning seasons
Sport	9	4	1921, 1922, 1924, 1925, 1927, 1929, 1931, 1932, 1933
JS Estonia	5	2	1934, 1935, 1936, 1937–38, 1938–39
Kalev	2	4	1923, 1930
TJK	2	4	1926, 1928
Tartu Olümpia	1	0	1939–40

== Estonian SSR champions ==
- 1945 – Dünamo Tallinn
- 1946 – Balti Laevastik Tallinn
- 1947 – Dünamo Tallinn
- 1948 – Balti Laevastik Tallinn
- 1949 – Dünamo Tallinn
- 1950 – Dünamo Tallinn
- 1951 – Balti Laevastik Tallinn
- 1952 – Balti Laevastik Tallinn
- 1953 – Dünamo Tallinn
- 1954 – Dünamo Tallinn
- 1955 – Kalev Tallinn
- 1956 – Balti Laevastik Tallinn
- 1957 – Kalev Ülemiste
- 1958 – Kalev Ülemiste
- 1959 – Kalev Ülemiste
- 1960 – Balti Laevastik Tallinn
- 1961 – Kalev Kopli
- 1962 – Kalev Ülemiste
- 1963 – Tempo Tallinn
- 1964 – Norma Tallinn
- 1965 – Balti Laevastik Tallinn
- 1966 – Balti Laevastik Tallinn
- 1967 – Norma Tallinn
- 1968 – Balti Laevastik Tallinn
- 1969 – Dvigatel Tallinn
- 1970 – Norma Tallinn
- 1971 – Tempo Tallinn
- 1972 – Balti Laevastik Tallinn
- 1973 – Kreenholm Narva
- 1974 – Baltika Narva
- 1975 – Baltika Narva
- 1976 – Dvigatel Tallinn
- 1977 – Baltika Narva
- 1978 – Dünamo Tallinn
- 1979 – Norma Tallinn
- 1980 – Dünamo Tallinn
- 1981 – Dünamo Tallinn
- 1982 – Tempo Tallinn
- 1983 – Dünamo Tallinn
- 1984 – Estonia Jõhvi
- 1985 – Kalakombinaat/MEK Pärnu
- 1986 – Zvezda Tallinn
- 1987 – Tempo Tallinn
- 1988 – Norma Tallinn
- 1989 – Zvezda Tallinn
- 1990 – TVMK Tallinn
- 1991 – TVMK Tallinn

Notes:

- Balti Laevastik was a Baltic Fleet club
- Zvezda Tallinn was a Tallinn garrison club
- Dvigatel means Motor or Engine
