= Toomas Kaldma =

Soviet and Estonian footballer, referee and coach (1943–2026)

Personal information
- Date of birth: 16 August 1943
- Place of birth: Tallinn, German-occupied Estonia
- Date of death: 1 July 2026 (aged 82)

Youth career
- Tallinna Kalev

Senior career*
Years	Team	Apps	(Gls)
–1959	Tallinna Kalev		
1959–?	Norma Tallinn		
- → Tallinna Dünamo (military service)
- Tallinna Tempo

International career
- Estonian SSR Youth
- * Club domestic league appearances and goals

Toomas Kaldma
Domestic
Years	League	Role
1976–1993	Estonian SSR Football Championship/Meistriliiga	Referee

Toomas Kaldma (16 August 1943 – 1 July 2026) was a Soviet and Estonian footballer, referee and coach.

== Career ==
Kaldma started playing football as a schoolboy, joining Tallinna Kalev under manager Uno Piir. In 1959, he joined Norma Tallinn. During his military service, he played for Tallinna Dünamo, before rejoining Norma Tallinn, and later playing for Tallinna Tempo. Overall, he won the Estonian SSR Cup in 1962 and the Estonian SSR Football Championship in 1971.

During the 1970s, Kaldma became a referee, officiating in the Estonian SSR Football Championship between 1976 and 1993, as well as 14 matches in the Soviet Top League. Additionally, he officiated the 1980 and 1990 Estonian SSR Cup finals, and served as an assistant referee in eight other finals.

Following his retirement in 1993 from officiating, he worked as a match inspector, as well as a youth coach for Nõmme Kalju, also working as a representative of the Estonia national team. Later on, he would become a pundit for Nõmme Kalju home matches.

In 2023, he was awarded the Silver Medal of the Estonian Football Association.

== Personal life and death ==
His son, Sten Kaldma, is a former FIFA-licensed referee, while his grandson Sören and granddaughter Liisa are both footballers, with Sören having played for the Estonia national team.

Kaldma died on 1 July 2026, at the age of 82.
