= 1968 Soviet Class A Second Group =

Soviet Class A Second Group
- Season: 1968
- Champions: FC Karpaty Lvov FC Sudostroitel Nikolaev FC Uralmash Sverdlovsk FC Irtysh Omsk
- Promoted: FC Uralmash Sverdlovsk

The 1968 Soviet Class A Second Group was the sixth season of the Soviet Class A Second Group football competitions that was established in 1963. It was also the 28th season of the Soviet second tier league competition.

== First stage ==
=== First subgroup ===
| Pos | Rep | Team | Pld | W | D | L | GF | GA | GD | Pts | |
|---|---|---|---|---|---|---|---|---|---|---|---|
| 1 | UKR | Karpaty Lvov | 40 | 26 | 7 | 7 | 80 | 34 | +46 | 59 | Final stage |
| 2 | UKR | SKA Kiev | 40 | 23 | 11 | 6 | 58 | 23 | +35 | 57 | |
| 3 | UKR | SKA Odessa | 40 | 19 | 12 | 9 | 50 | 30 | +20 | 50 | |
| 4 | UKR | Avtomobilist Zhitomir | 40 | 17 | 16 | 7 | 38 | 19 | +19 | 50 | |
| 5 | UKR | SelStroi Poltava (Note: SelStroi Poltava was called Kolos.) | 40 | 18 | 13 | 9 | 50 | 34 | +16 | 49 | |
| 6 | RUS | Dinamo Leningrad | 40 | 16 | 14 | 10 | 70 | 39 | +31 | 46 | |
| 7 | UKR | SKA Lvov | 40 | 16 | 14 | 10 | 40 | 42 | −2 | 46 | |
| 8 | LVA | Daugava Riga | 40 | 16 | 13 | 11 | 39 | 27 | +12 | 45 | |
| 9 | MDA | Moldova Kishinev | 40 | 16 | 12 | 12 | 40 | 36 | +4 | 44 | |
| 10 | UKR | Lokomotiv Vinnitsa | 40 | 14 | 13 | 13 | 46 | 33 | +13 | 41 | |
| 11 | UKR | Azovets Zhdanov | 40 | 11 | 17 | 12 | 30 | 30 | 0 | 39 | Relegation tournament |
| 12 | UKR | Khimik Severodonetsk | 40 | 11 | 14 | 15 | 44 | 51 | −7 | 36 | Relegation tournament |
| 13 | RUS | Lokomotiv Kaluga | 40 | 13 | 9 | 18 | 35 | 56 | −21 | 35 | |
| 14 | RUS | Metallurg Tula | 40 | 9 | 16 | 15 | 31 | 40 | −9 | 34 | |
| 15 | RUS | Volga Kalinin | 40 | 11 | 12 | 17 | 33 | 44 | −11 | 34 | |
| 16 | LTU | Žalgiris Vilnius | 40 | 11 | 11 | 18 | 30 | 43 | −13 | 33 | |
| 17 | UKR | Krivbass Krivoi Rog | 40 | 8 | 16 | 16 | 40 | 51 | −11 | 32 | Relegation tournament |
| 18 | RUS | Baltika Kaliningrad | 40 | 8 | 13 | 19 | 30 | 59 | −29 | 29 | |
| 19 | BLR | Neman Grodno | 40 | 6 | 17 | 17 | 20 | 53 | −33 | 29 | |
| 20 | EST | Dinamo Tallinn | 40 | 8 | 12 | 20 | 29 | 60 | −31 | 28 | Relegation to Estonian competitions |
| 21 | BLR | Spartak Gomel | 40 | 6 | 12 | 22 | 21 | 50 | −29 | 24 | Relegation to Class B |

==== Number of teams by republics ====
| Number | Union republics | Team(s) |
|---|---|---|
| 10 | Ukrainian SSR | FC Karpaty Lvov, SKA Kiev, SKA Odessa, FC Avtomobilist Zhitomir, FC Selstroi Poltava, SKA Lvov, FC Lokomotiv Vinnitsa, FC Azovets Zhdanov, FC Khimik Severodonetsk, FC Krivbass Krivoi Rog |
| 5 | Russian SFSR | FC Dinamo Leningrad, FC Lokomotiv Kaluga, FC Metallurg Tula, FC Volga Kalinin, FC Baltika Kaliningrad |
| 2 | Belarusian SSR | FC Spartak Gomel, FC Neman Grodno |
| 1 | Latvian SSR | FC Daugava Riga |
| 1 | Moldavian SSR | FC Moldova Kishinev |
| 1 | Lithuanian SSR | FK Žalgiris Vilnius |
| 1 | Estonian SSR | FC Dinamo Tallinn |

=== Second subgroup ===
| Pos | Rep | Team | Pld | W | D | L | GF | GA | GD | Pts | |
|---|---|---|---|---|---|---|---|---|---|---|---|
| 1 | UKR | Sudnobudivnyk Mykolaiv | 40 | 23 | 15 | 2 | 51 | 22 | +29 | 61 | Final stage |
| 2 | UKR | Metallist Kharkov | 40 | 21 | 13 | 6 | 45 | 18 | +27 | 55 | |
| 3 | UKR | Dnepr Dnepropetrovsk | 40 | 19 | 16 | 5 | 50 | 27 | +23 | 54 | |
| 4 | UKR | Zvezda Kirovograd | 40 | 19 | 15 | 6 | 52 | 39 | +13 | 53 | |
| 5 | RUS | Trud Voronezh | 40 | 18 | 14 | 8 | 49 | 28 | +21 | 50 | |
| 6 | UKR | Tavria Simferopol | 40 | 20 | 10 | 10 | 51 | 33 | +18 | 50 | |
| 7 | RUS | Kuban Krasnodar | 40 | 19 | 11 | 10 | 43 | 26 | +17 | 49 | |
| 8 | RUS | Sokol Saratov | 40 | 18 | 12 | 10 | 59 | 32 | +27 | 48 | |
| 9 | UKR | Metallurg Zaporozhye | 40 | 14 | 15 | 11 | 52 | 42 | +10 | 43 | |
| 10 | RUS | Shinnik Yaroslavl | 40 | 12 | 18 | 10 | 31 | 26 | +5 | 42 | |
| 11 | UKR | Lokomotiv Kherson | 40 | 15 | 11 | 14 | 42 | 32 | +10 | 41 | |
| 12 | RUS | RostSelMash Rostov-na-Donu | 40 | 12 | 15 | 13 | 40 | 41 | −1 | 39 | |
| 13 | RUS | Textilshchik Ivanovo | 40 | 11 | 15 | 14 | 36 | 43 | −7 | 37 | |
| 14 | RUS | Dinamo Stavropol | 40 | 9 | 15 | 16 | 26 | 36 | −10 | 33 | |
| 15 | UKR | Avangard Zholtyye Vody | 40 | 8 | 16 | 16 | 33 | 44 | −11 | 32 | Relegation tournament |
| 16 | RUS | Spartak Nalchik | 40 | 11 | 10 | 19 | 41 | 60 | −19 | 32 | |
| 17 | RUS | Metallurg Kuibyshev | 40 | 9 | 12 | 19 | 28 | 42 | −14 | 30 | |
| 18 | UKR | Dnipro Kremenchuk | 40 | 7 | 14 | 19 | 23 | 46 | −23 | 28 | Relegation tournament |
| 19 | RUS | Metallurg Lipetsk | 40 | 3 | 15 | 22 | 22 | 55 | −33 | 21 | |
| 20 | RUS | Zvezda Ryazan (Note: Zvezda Ryazan was called Spartak.) | 40 | 4 | 13 | 23 | 19 | 60 | −41 | 21 | |
| 21 | UKR | SKCF Sevastopol | 40 | 5 | 11 | 24 | 16 | 57 | −41 | 21 | Relegation tournament |

==== Number of teams by republics ====
| Number | Union republics | Team(s) |
|---|---|---|
| 11 | Russian SFSR | FC Trud Voronezh, FC Kuban Krasnodar, FC Sokol Saratov, FC Shinnik Yaroslavl, FC Rostselmash Rostov-na-Donu, FC Tekstilshchik Ivanovo, FC Dinamo Stavropol, FC Spartak Nalchik, FC Metallurg Kuibyshev, FC Metallurg Lipetsk, FC Zvezda Ryazan |
| 10 | Ukrainian SSR | FC Sudostroitel Nikolaev, FC Metallist Kharkov, FC Dnepr Dnepropetrovsk, FC Zirka Kirovograd, SC Tavria Simferopol, FC Metallurg Zaporozhye, FC Lokomotiv Kherson, FC Avangard Zheltye Vody, Dnipro Kremenchuk, SKCF Sevastopol |

=== Third subgroup ===
| Pos | Rep | Team | Pld | W | D | L | GF | GA | GD | Pts | |
|---|---|---|---|---|---|---|---|---|---|---|---|
| 1 | RUS | UralMash Sverdlovsk | 40 | 24 | 10 | 6 | 57 | 19 | +38 | 58 | Final stage |
| 2 | RUS | Spartak Orjonikidze | 40 | 19 | 12 | 9 | 53 | 29 | +24 | 50 | |
| 3 | RUS | Dinamo Makhachkala | 40 | 17 | 16 | 7 | 30 | 18 | +12 | 50 | |
| 4 | RUS | Volga Gorkiy | 40 | 18 | 12 | 10 | 54 | 28 | +26 | 48 | |
| 5 | RUS | Rubin Kazan | 40 | 19 | 9 | 12 | 52 | 31 | +21 | 47 | |
| 6 | RUS | Lokomotiv Chelyabinsk | 40 | 15 | 15 | 10 | 40 | 32 | +8 | 45 | |
| 7 | GEO | Dinamo Batumi | 40 | 13 | 15 | 12 | 44 | 39 | +5 | 41 | |
| 8 | GEO | Lokomotiv Tbilisi | 40 | 14 | 12 | 14 | 45 | 37 | +8 | 40 | |
| 9 | RUS | Volgar Astrakhan | 40 | 13 | 14 | 13 | 46 | 45 | +1 | 40 | |
| 10 | RUS | Zenit Izhevsk | 40 | 13 | 14 | 13 | 34 | 40 | −6 | 40 | |
| 11 | AZE | Polad Sumgait | 40 | 15 | 10 | 15 | 34 | 42 | −8 | 40 | |
| 12 | RUS | Zvezda Perm | 40 | 11 | 17 | 12 | 30 | 37 | −7 | 39 | |
| 13 | RUS | Traktor Volgograd | 40 | 13 | 11 | 16 | 49 | 50 | −1 | 37 | |
| 14 | RUS | Spartak Yoshkar-Ola | 40 | 11 | 15 | 14 | 34 | 36 | −2 | 37 | |
| 15 | RUS | Torpedo Taganrog | 40 | 12 | 12 | 16 | 33 | 40 | −7 | 36 | |
| 16 | RUS | Volga Ulyanovsk | 40 | 14 | 8 | 18 | 43 | 58 | −15 | 36 | |
| 17 | RUS | Stroitel Ufa | 40 | 11 | 12 | 17 | 40 | 55 | −15 | 34 | |
| 18 | GEO | Meshakhte Tkibuli | 40 | 7 | 19 | 14 | 35 | 48 | −13 | 33 | |
| 19 | RUS | Terek Grozny | 40 | 9 | 13 | 18 | 45 | 55 | −10 | 31 | |
| 20 | ARM | Shirak Leninakan | 40 | 9 | 11 | 20 | 28 | 56 | −28 | 29 | |
| 21 | RUS | Metallurg Magnitogorsk | 40 | 7 | 15 | 18 | 30 | 61 | −31 | 29 | |

==== Number of teams by republics ====
| Number | Union republics | Team(s) |
|---|---|---|
| 16 | Russian SFSR | FC Uralmash Sverdlovsk, FC Spartak Ordzhonikidze, FC Dinamo Makhachkala, FC Volga Gorkiy, FC Rubin Kazan, FC Lokomotiv Chelyabinsk, FC Volgar Astrakhan, FC Zenit Izhevsk, FC Zvezda Perm, FC Traktor Volgograd, FC Spartak Yoshkar-Ola, FC Torpedo Taganrog, FC Volga Ulyanovsk, FC Stroitel Ufa, FC Terek Grozny, FC Metallurg Magnitogorsk |
| 3 | Georgian SSR | FC Dinamo Batumi, FC Lokomotiv Tbilisi, FC Meshakhte Tkibuli |
| 1 | Azerbaijan SSR | FC Polad Sumgait |
| 1 | Armenian SSR | FC Shirak Leninakan |

=== Fourth subgroup ===
| Pos | Rep | Team | Pld | W | D | L | GF | GA | GD | Pts | |
|---|---|---|---|---|---|---|---|---|---|---|---|
| 1 | RUS | Irtysh Omsk | 40 | 22 | 11 | 7 | 44 | 21 | +23 | 55 | Final stage |
| 2 | RUS | Kuzbass Kemerovo | 40 | 21 | 8 | 11 | 44 | 30 | +14 | 50 | |
| 3 | RUS | SKA Khabarovsk | 40 | 18 | 14 | 8 | 37 | 25 | +12 | 50 | |
| 4 | UZB | Politotdel Tashkent Region | 40 | 18 | 11 | 11 | 53 | 31 | +22 | 47 | |
| 5 | TKM | Stroitel Ashkhabad | 40 | 20 | 5 | 15 | 68 | 52 | +16 | 45 | |
| 6 | UZB | Neftyanik Fergana | 40 | 12 | 21 | 7 | 29 | 22 | +7 | 45 | |
| 7 | RUS | TomLes Tomsk (Note: TomLes Tomsk was called Torpedo.) | 40 | 16 | 12 | 12 | 45 | 36 | +9 | 44 | |
| 8 | RUS | SKA Chita | 40 | 16 | 12 | 12 | 40 | 38 | +2 | 44 | |
| 9 | TJK | Energetik Dushanbe | 40 | 14 | 14 | 12 | 58 | 47 | +11 | 42 | |
| 10 | RUS | Temp Barnaul | 40 | 13 | 16 | 11 | 35 | 26 | +9 | 42 | |
| 11 | UZB | Zarafshan Navoi | 40 | 15 | 12 | 13 | 46 | 44 | +2 | 42 | |
| 12 | KAZ | Shakhtyor Karaganda | 40 | 13 | 15 | 12 | 42 | 35 | +7 | 41 | |
| 13 | RUS | Luch Vladivostok | 40 | 14 | 13 | 13 | 36 | 37 | −1 | 41 | |
| 14 | RUS | Aeroflot Irkutsk (Note: Aeroflot Irkutsk was called Angara.) | 40 | 12 | 12 | 16 | 37 | 49 | −12 | 36 | |
| 15 | KAZ | Vostok Ust-Kamenogorsk | 40 | 14 | 8 | 18 | 34 | 48 | −14 | 36 | |
| 16 | RUS | Selenga Ulan-Ude | 40 | 12 | 12 | 16 | 37 | 52 | −15 | 36 | |
| 17 | KGZ | Alga Frunze | 40 | 10 | 15 | 15 | 22 | 33 | −11 | 35 | |
| 18 | RUS | Rassvet Krasnoyarsk (Note: Rassvet Krasnoyarsk was called Lokomotiv.) | 40 | 10 | 14 | 16 | 34 | 44 | −10 | 34 | |
| 19 | KAZ | Metallurg Chimkent | 40 | 8 | 16 | 16 | 33 | 47 | −14 | 32 | |
| 20 | RUS | SKA Novosibirsk | 40 | 3 | 16 | 21 | 24 | 52 | −28 | 22 | |
| 21 | TJK | Pamir Leninabad | 40 | 5 | 9 | 26 | 31 | 60 | −29 | 19 | |

==== Number of teams by republics ====
| Number | Union republics | Team(s) |
|---|---|---|
| 11 | Russian SFSR | FC Irtysh Omsk, FC Kuzbass Kemerevo, FC SKA Khabarovsk, FC Tomles Tomsk, FC SKA Chita, FC Temp Barnaul, FC Luch Vladivostok, FC Aeroflot Irkutsk, FC Selenga Ulan-Ude, FC Rassvet Krasnoyarsk, FC SKA Novosibirsk |
| 3 | Uzbek SSR | FC Politotdel Tashkent Region, FC Neftyanik Fergana, FC Zarafshan Navoi |
| 3 | Kazakh SSR | FC Shakhter Karaganda, FC Vostok Ust-Kamenogorsk, FC Metallurg Chimkent |
| 2 | Tajik SSR | FC Energetik Dushanbe, FC Pamir Leninabad |
| 1 | Turkmen SSR | FC Stroitel Ashkhabad |
| 1 | Kyrgyz SSR | FC Alga Frunze |

== Final stage ==
=== For places 1-4 ===
[Nov 17-24, Sochi]

| Pos | Rep | Team | Pld | W | D | L | GF | GA | GD | Pts | Promotion |
|---|---|---|---|---|---|---|---|---|---|---|---|
| 1 | RUS | UralMash Sverdlovsk | 3 | 1 | 2 | 0 | 5 | 3 | +2 | 4 | Promoted |
| 2 | UKR | Karpaty Lvov | 3 | 1 | 1 | 1 | 5 | 2 | +3 | 3 | |
| 3 | RUS | Irtysh Omsk | 3 | 1 | 1 | 1 | 4 | 6 | −2 | 3 | |
| 4 | UKR | Sudnobudivnyk Mykolaiv | 3 | 1 | 0 | 2 | 3 | 6 | −3 | 2 | |

Source: rsssf.com

=== Relegation Tournament for Ukraine ===
[Nov 12-20]

| Pos | Team | Pld | W | D | L | GF | GA | GD | Pts | Relegation |
|---|---|---|---|---|---|---|---|---|---|---|
| 1 | Krivbass Krivoi Rog | 5 | 3 | 2 | 0 | 7 | 2 | +5 | 8 | |
| 2 | Khimik Severodonetsk | 5 | 4 | 0 | 1 | 8 | 3 | +5 | 8 | |
| 3 | Azovets Zhdanov | 5 | 2 | 2 | 1 | 4 | 4 | 0 | 6 | |
| 4 | Dnipro Kremenchuk | 5 | 2 | 1 | 2 | 5 | 4 | +1 | 5 | Relegated |
| 5 | Avangard Zholtyye Vody | 5 | 1 | 1 | 3 | 2 | 6 | −4 | 3 | Relegated |
| 6 | SKCF Sevastopol | 5 | 0 | 0 | 5 | 2 | 9 | −7 | 0 | Relegated |

Source: rsssf.com

== See also ==
- Soviet First League
