= 1953 Soviet Class B =

Soviet Class B
- Season: 1953
- Champions: Dinamo Minsk (Final) Spartak Tbilisi (Group 1); Krasnoye Znamia Ivanovo (Group 2); Shakhter Stalino (Group 3)
- Promoted: Dinamo Minsk; Torpedo Gorkiy

The 1953 Soviet Class B was the fourth season in Soviet Class B and 14th in second tier. It involved a participation of 27 teams. Started on May 2, it continued to September 27, 1953.

FC Dinamo Minsk has won the competition.

The competition consisted of two stages. At the first stage, teams were split in three groups playing each other home-away double round-robin tournament. At the second stage, teams played with their counterparts from other two groups however the top two teams from each group formed the first pool which was the only one consisting of 6 teams, while other consisted of 3 teams.

== Teams ==
=== Relegated teams ===
Four teams were relegated from the 1952 Soviet Class A (top tier).

- VVS Moscow (return after a six-year absence)
- FC Daugava Riga (return after a four-year absence)
- FC Shakhter Donetsk (return after a four-year absence)
- FC Dinamo Minsk (return after a year absence)

=== Promoted teams ===
- Torpedo Rostov-na-Donu – debut
- Zenit Kaliningrad – return after a three-year absence, Champion of the 1952 KFK competitions Russian SFSR (as "Zavod imeni Kalinina")
- Spartak Kalinin – return after a three-year absence
- Avangard Chelyabinsk – return after a two-year absence
- Krylia Sovetov Molotov – return after a three-year absence, placed 9th in the 1952 KFK competitions Russian SFSR (as "SC imeni Stalina")
- Avangard Sverdlovsk – return after a three-year absence
- KBF Tallinn – debut, Champion of the 1952 Estonian SSR Football Championship, replaced with Kalev Tallinn
- Metallurg Zaporozhye – return after a three-year absence, Champion of the 1952 Football Championship of the Ukrainian SSR
- Metallurg Dnepropetrovsk – return after a three-year absence
- Metallurg Odessa – debut, placed 8th in Group 3 of the 1952 Football Championship of the Ukrainian SSR (results are counted for Chornomorets Odesa relegated in 1950)
- Spartaki Tbilisi – return after a three-year absence
- Gornyak Leninabad – debut
- Iskra Frunze – return after a year absence

=== Withdrawn teams ===
After death of Joseph Stalin, several teams that represented Soviet Armed Forces were dissolved on orders of Minister of Defense Nikolay Bulganin:

- VVS Moscow
- VMS Moscow – replaced with Khimik Moscow
- DO Tashkent – replaced with Spartak Tashkent
- DO Tbilisi – temporary
- DO Kiev – temporary
- DO Sverdlovsk

== First stage ==
=== Zone I ===
| Pos | Rep | Team | Pld | W | D | L | GF | GA | GR | Pts |
|---|---|---|---|---|---|---|---|---|---|---|
| 1 | GEO | Spartak Tbilisi | 15 | 10 | 4 | 1 | 41 | 12 | 3.417 | 24 |
| 2 | ARM | Dinamo Yerevan | 15 | 9 | 3 | 3 | 24 | 7 | 3.429 | 21 |
| 3 | RUS | Torpedo Rostov-na-Donu | 15 | 8 | 3 | 4 | 33 | 18 | 1.833 | 19 |
| 4 | AZE | Neftyanik Baku | 15 | 7 | 3 | 5 | 36 | 17 | 2.118 | 17 |
| 5 | KAZ | Dinamo Alma-Ata | 15 | 7 | 2 | 6 | 27 | 18 | 1.500 | 16 |
| 6 | TKM | Spartak Ashkhabad | 15 | 7 | 0 | 8 | 21 | 38 | 0.553 | 14 |
| 7 | UZB | Spartak Tashkent | 8 | 3 | 1 | 4 | 8 | 11 | 0.727 | 7 |
| 8 | KGZ | Iskra Frunze | 15 | 3 | 0 | 12 | 16 | 53 | 0.302 | 6 |
| 9 | TJK | Gornyak Leninabad | 15 | 1 | 2 | 12 | 14 | 46 | 0.304 | 4 |

Source: rsssf.com

=== Zone II ===
| Pos | Rep | Team | Pld | W | D | L | GF | GA | GR | Pts |
|---|---|---|---|---|---|---|---|---|---|---|
| 1 | RUS | Krasnoye Znamya Ivanovo | 17 | 10 | 4 | 3 | 27 | 9 | 3.000 | 24 |
| 2 | BLR | Dinamo Minsk | 17 | 9 | 6 | 2 | 25 | 12 | 2.083 | 24 |
| 3 | UKR | Metallurg Odessa | 17 | 6 | 8 | 3 | 20 | 12 | 1.667 | 20 |
| 4 | RUS | Zenit Kaliningrad (M.R.) | 17 | 7 | 5 | 5 | 19 | 18 | 1.056 | 19 |
| 5 | LVA | Daugava Riga | 17 | 6 | 5 | 6 | 24 | 22 | 1.091 | 17 |
| 6 | MDA | Burevestnik Kishinev | 17 | 4 | 8 | 5 | 14 | 20 | 0.700 | 16 |
| 7 | EST | Kalev Tallinn | 17 | 4 | 6 | 7 | 9 | 19 | 0.474 | 14 |
| 8 | RUS | Spartak Kalinin | 17 | 4 | 3 | 10 | 20 | 25 | 0.800 | 11 |
| 9 | RUS | Khimik Moskva | 9 | 4 | 1 | 4 | 17 | 13 | 1.308 | 9 |
| 10 | KAR | Krasnaya Zvezda Petrozavodsk | 17 | 2 | 4 | 11 | 15 | 40 | 0.375 | 8 |

Source: rsssf.com

=== Zone III ===
| Pos | Rep | Team | Pld | W | D | L | GF | GA | GR | Pts |
|---|---|---|---|---|---|---|---|---|---|---|
| 1 | UKR | Shakhtyor Stalino | 14 | 9 | 4 | 1 | 33 | 9 | 3.667 | 22 |
| 2 | RUS | Torpedo Gorkiy | 14 | 10 | 1 | 3 | 38 | 23 | 1.652 | 21 |
| 3 | UKR | Metallurg Zaporozhye | 14 | 6 | 3 | 5 | 34 | 26 | 1.308 | 15 |
| 4 | RUS | Torpedo Stalingrad | 14 | 7 | 1 | 6 | 25 | 22 | 1.136 | 15 |
| 5 | RUS | Avangard Chelyabinsk | 14 | 5 | 4 | 5 | 18 | 22 | 0.818 | 14 |
| 6 | RUS | Krylya Sovetov Molotov | 14 | 4 | 3 | 7 | 18 | 29 | 0.621 | 11 |
| 7 | RUS | Avangard Sverdlovsk | 14 | 3 | 2 | 9 | 19 | 33 | 0.576 | 8 |
| 8 | UKR | Metallurg Dnepropetrovsk | 14 | 2 | 2 | 10 | 14 | 35 | 0.400 | 6 |

Source: rsssf.com

== Second stage ==
=== For places 1-6 ===
| Pos | Rep | Team | Pld | W | D | L | GF | GA | GR | Pts | Promotion |
|---|---|---|---|---|---|---|---|---|---|---|---|
| 1 | BLR | Dinamo Minsk | 5 | 4 | 1 | 0 | 11 | 1 | 11.000 | 9 | Promoted |
| 2 | RUS | Torpedo Gorkiy | 5 | 3 | 1 | 1 | 9 | 4 | 2.250 | 7 | Promoted |
| 3 | UKR | Shakhtyor Stalino | 5 | 3 | 0 | 2 | 6 | 5 | 1.200 | 6 | |
| 4 | RUS | Krasnoye Znamya Ivanovo | 5 | 2 | 0 | 3 | 6 | 10 | 0.600 | 4 | |
| 5 | ARM | Dinamo Yerevan | 5 | 0 | 3 | 2 | 2 | 5 | 0.400 | 3 | |
| 6 | GEO | Spartak Tbilisi | 5 | 0 | 1 | 4 | 1 | 10 | 0.100 | 1 | |

Source: rsssf.com
Notes:

Sep 13-27, Gorkiy

=== For places 7-9 ===
| Pos | Rep | Team | Pld | W | D | L | GF | GA | GR | Pts |
|---|---|---|---|---|---|---|---|---|---|---|
| 7 | UKR | Metallurg Odessa | 2 | 2 | 0 | 0 | 5 | 1 | 5.000 | 4 |
| 8 | RUS | Torpedo Rostov-na-Donu | 2 | 1 | 0 | 1 | 5 | 5 | 1.000 | 2 |
| 9 | UKR | Metallurg Zaporozhye | 2 | 0 | 0 | 2 | 5 | 9 | 0.556 | 0 |

Source: rsssf.com

=== For places 10-12 ===
| Pos | Rep | Team | Pld | W | D | L | GF | GA | GR | Pts |
|---|---|---|---|---|---|---|---|---|---|---|
| 10 | RUS | Zenit Kaliningrad (M.R.) | 2 | 2 | 0 | 0 | 3 | 1 | 3.000 | 4 |
| 11 | AZE | Neftyanik Baku | 2 | 1 | 0 | 1 | 3 | 3 | 1.000 | 2 |
| 12 | RUS | Torpedo Stalingrad | 2 | 0 | 0 | 2 | 3 | 5 | 0.600 | 0 |

Source: rsssf.com
Notes:

Sep 27 - Oct 1, Baku

=== For places 13-15 ===
11 October 1953

| Daugava Riga | 2 – 0 | Avangard Chelyabinsk |
|---|---|---|
| | [ Report] |

Riga
- Notes: Dinamo Alma-Ata withdrew.

=== For places 16-18 ===
| Pos | Rep | Team | Pld | W | D | L | GF | GA | GR | Pts |
|---|---|---|---|---|---|---|---|---|---|---|
| 16 | MDA | Burevestnik Kishinev | 2 | 1 | 1 | 0 | 5 | 2 | 2.500 | 3 |
| 17 | RUS | Krylya Sovetov Molotov | 2 | 1 | 0 | 1 | 2 | 4 | 0.500 | 2 |
| 18 | TKM | Spartak Ashkhabad | 2 | 0 | 1 | 1 | 1 | 2 | 0.500 | 1 |

Source: rsssf.com
Notes:

Sep 29 – Oct 3, Kishinev

=== For places 19-21 ===
| Pos | Rep | Team | Pld | W | D | L | GF | GA | GR | Pts |
|---|---|---|---|---|---|---|---|---|---|---|
| 19 | RUS | Avangard Sverdlovsk | 2 | 2 | 0 | 0 | 9 | 1 | 9.000 | 4 |
| 20 | EST | Kalev Tallinn | 2 | 1 | 0 | 1 | 2 | 2 | 1.000 | 2 |
| 21 | UZB | Spartak Tashkent | 2 | 0 | 0 | 2 | 1 | 9 | 0.111 | 0 |

Source: rsssf.com
Notes:

Sep 27 – Oct 1, Sverdlovsk

=== For places 22-24 ===
| Pos | Rep | Team | Pld | W | D | L | GF | GA | GR | Pts |
|---|---|---|---|---|---|---|---|---|---|---|
| 22 | UKR | Metallurg Dnepropetrovsk | 2 | 2 | 0 | 0 | 5 | 0 | — | 4 |
| 23 | RUS | Spartak Kalinin | 2 | 1 | 0 | 1 | 9 | 5 | 1.800 | 2 |
| 24 | KGZ | Iskra Frunze | 2 | 0 | 0 | 2 | 2 | 11 | 0.182 | 0 |

Source: rsssf.com
Notes:

Sep 26-29, Dnepropetrovsk

=== For places 25-27 ===
| Pos | Rep | Team | Pld | W | D | L | GF | GA | GR | Pts |
|---|---|---|---|---|---|---|---|---|---|---|
| 25 | RUS | Khimik Moskva | 2 | 1 | 1 | 0 | 8 | 1 | 8.000 | 3 |
| 26 | RUS | Krasnaya Zvezda Petrozavodsk | 2 | 1 | 1 | 0 | 6 | 2 | 3.000 | 3 |
| 27 | TJK | Gornyak Leninabad | 2 | 0 | 0 | 2 | 1 | 12 | 0.083 | 0 |

Source: rsssf.com
Notes:

Sep 25-29, Moskva

== Number of teams by republics ==
| Number | Union republics | Team(s) |
|---|---|---|
| 10 | Russian SFSR | FC Khimik Moscow FC Torpedo Rostov-na-Donu, FC Krasnoye Znamya Ivanovo, FC Zenit Kaliningrad, FC Spartak Kalinin, FC Torpedo Gorkiy, FC Torpedo Stalingrad, FC Avangard Chelyabinsk, FC Krylia Sovetov Molotov, FC Avangard Sverdlovsk |
| 4 | Ukrainian SSR | FC Metallurg Odessa, FC Shakhter Stalino, FC Metallurg Zaporozhye, FC Metallurg Dnepropetrovsk |
| 1 | Georgian SSR | FC Spartaki Tbilisi |
| 1 | Armenian SSR | FC Dinamo Yerevan |
| 1 | Azerbaijan SSR | FC Neftianik Baku |
| 1 | Kazakh SSR | FC Dinamo Alma-Ata |
| 1 | Turkmen SSR | FC Spartak Asgabat |
| 1 | Uzbek SSR | FC Spartak Tashkent |
| 1 | Kirghiz SSR | FC Iskra Frunze |
| 1 | Tajik SSR | FC Gornyak Leninabad |
| 1 | Belarusian SSR | FC Dinamo Minsk |
| 1 | Latvian SSR | FC Daugava Riga |
| 1 | Moldavian SSR | FC Burevestnik Kishinev |
| 1 | Estonian SSR | FC Kalev Tallinn |
| 1 | Karelo-Finnish SSR | FC Krasnaya Zvezda Petrozavodsk |

== See also ==
- 1953 Soviet Class A
- 1953 Soviet Cup
