= 1962 Estonian SSR Football Championship =

Estonian SSR Higher League
- Season: 1962
- Champions: Ülemiste Kalev; 4th title

The 1962 Estonian SSR Football Championship was won by Ülemiste Kalev.

== Group A ==
Pos	Team	Pld	W	D	L	GF	GA	GD	Pts	Qualification or relegation
1	Baltic Fleet Tallinn	14	8	5	1	33	15	+18	21	Qualification for Championship play-off
2	Kohtla-Järve Kalev	14	7	4	3	21	13	+8	18	Qualification for Championship play-off
3	Tempo	14	7	3	4	30	14	+16	17	Qualification for Championship play-off
4	Narva Kreenholm	14	6	1	7	33	31	+2	13	Qualification for Championship play-off
5	EAT Tallinn	14	4	5	5	22	33	−11	13	Qualification for Bottom play-off
6	Aseri Kalev	14	5	3	6	25	33	−8	13	Qualification for Bottom play-off
7	Türi Jõud	14	4	1	9	21	35	−14	9	Qualification for Bottom play-off
8	Punane Kunda	14	3	2	9	16	37	−21	8	Qualification for Bottom play-off

== Group B ==
Pos	Team	Pld	W	D	L	GF	GA	GD	Pts	Qualification or relegation
1	Norma	14	10	2	2	40	10	+30	22	Qualification for Championship play-off
2	Ülemiste Kalev	14	9	4	1	43	19	+24	22	Qualification for Championship play-off
3	Pärnu Kalev	14	10	1	3	42	18	+24	21	Qualification for Championship play-off
4	Kiviõli Kombinaat	14	8	2	4	33	22	+11	18	Qualification for Championship play-off
5	Narva Kalev	14	5	3	6	23	28	−5	13	Qualification for Bottom play-off
6	Kopli Dünamo	14	3	1	10	16	39	−23	7	Qualification for Bottom play-off
7	Tartu Kalev	14	3	1	10	11	40	−29	7	Qualification for Bottom play-off
8	SAM Viljandi	14	1	0	13	9	49	−40	2	Qualification for Bottom play-off

== Championship play-off ==
Pos	Team	Pld	W	D	L	GF	GA	GD	Pts
1	Ülemiste Kalev (C)	22	15	5	2	64	17	+47	35
2	Pärnu Kalev	22	15	2	5	57	25	+32	32
3	Norma	22	14	3	5	59	29	+30	31
4	Kiviõli Kombinaat	22	13	4	5	45	26	+19	30
5	Baltic Fleet Tallinn	22	10	7	5	45	32	+13	27
6	Tempo	22	9	4	9	36	23	+13	22
7	Kohtla-Järve Kalev	22	9	4	9	29	36	−7	22
8	Narva Kreenholm	22	7	3	12	41	47	−6	17

(C) Champions

== Bottom play-off ==
Pos	Team	Pld	W	D	L	GF	GA	GD	Pts
1	Aseri Kalev	22	11	3	8	51	44	+7	25
2	EAT Tallinn	22	7	6	9	45	37	+8	20
3	Türi Jõud (R)	22	9	1	12	43	51	−8	19
4	Punane Kunda (R)	22	7	3	12	38	52	−14	17
5	Kopli Dünamo (R)	22	8	1	13	29	54	−25	17
6	Narva Kalev (R)	22	6	4	12	33	49	−16	16
7	Tartu Kalev (R)	22	7	2	13	31	60	−29	16
8	SAM Viljandi (R)	22	3	0	19	23	87	−64	6

(R) Relegated

== Top goal scorers ==
Rank	Player	Club	Goals
1	N. Lunin	Kiviõli Kombinaat	18
1	Vjatšeslav Kartašov	Pärnu Kalev	18
1	A. Valter	Tempo	18
4	L. Lebedev	Narva Kreenholm	15
5	Toomas Kaldma	Norma	14
6	Gennadi Konstantinov	Aseri Kalev	12
6	Peeter Priks	Norma	12
8	Boris Puksmann	Ülemiste Kalev	11
9	Ülo Hendrikson	Pärnu Kalev	10
9	Juri Kuskin	Kohtla-Järve Kalev	10
