= 1959 Estonian SSR Football Championship =

Estonian SSR Higher League
- Season: 1959
- Champions: Ülemiste Kalev; 3rd title

The 1959 Estonian SSR Football Championship was won by Ülemiste Kalev.

== League table ==
Pos	Team	Pld	W	D	L	GF	GA	GD	Pts
1	Ülemiste Kalev (C)	18	14	2	2	55	14	+41	30
2	Baltic Fleet Tallinn	18	12	2	4	59	17	+42	26
3	Tallinna Punane Koit	18	12	1	5	33	24	+9	25
4	Narva Kalev	18	9	2	7	28	29	−1	20
5	Pärnu Kalev	18	8	3	7	36	29	+7	19
6	Norma	18	7	4	7	29	25	+4	18
7	Rakvere Kalev	18	6	4	8	22	27	−5	16
8	Tartu Dünamo	18	4	5	9	26	44	−18	13
9	Kohtla-Järve PK	18	3	3	12	20	37	−17	9
10	Viljandi Kalev (R)	18	2	0	16	11	73	−62	4

(C) Champions; (R) Relegated
