= 1976 Estonian SSR Football Championship =

Estonian SSR Higher League
- Season: 1976
- Champions: Dvigatel; 2nd title

The 1976 Estonian SSR Football Championship was won by Dvigatel.

== League table ==
Pos	Team	Pld	W	D	L	GF	GA	GD	Pts
1	Dvigatel (C)	22	14	6	2	44	13	+31	34
2	Norma	22	15	3	4	49	24	+25	33
3	Narva Baltika	22	12	7	3	40	15	+25	31
4	Tartu Remonditehas	22	8	10	4	30	20	+10	26
5	Pärnu Kalev	22	10	5	7	33	29	+4	25
6	Kopli Dünamo	22	8	9	5	31	23	+8	25
7	Aseri SK	22	7	6	9	30	42	−12	20
8	Tempo	22	7	5	10	40	40	0	19
9	Kohtla-Järve Keemik	22	4	11	7	15	17	−2	19
10	Sillamäe Kalev	22	5	6	11	22	31	−9	16
11	Tallinna Tekstiil (R)	22	4	4	14	19	44	−25	12
12	Kohtla-Järve RBT (R)	22	0	4	18	21	76	−55	4

(C) Champions; (R) Relegated
