= 1974 Estonian SSR Football Championship =

Estonian SSR Higher League
- Season: 1974
- Champions: Narva Baltika; 1st title

The 1974 Estonian SSR Football Championship was won by Narva Baltika.

== League table ==
Pos	Team	Pld	W	D	L	GF	GA	GD	Pts
1	Narva Baltika (C)	22	15	5	2	41	15	+26	35
2	Kopli Dünamo	22	15	3	4	46	21	+25	33
3	Pärnu Kalev	22	10	6	6	43	27	+16	26
4	Tallinna Tekstiil	22	11	4	7	38	24	+14	26
5	Narva Kreenholm	22	10	5	7	43	32	+11	25
6	Tallinna Tempo	22	10	5	7	35	27	+8	25
7	Tartu Remonditehas	22	10	4	8	36	31	+5	24
8	Sillamäe Kalev	22	7	5	10	30	31	−1	19
9	Norma	22	4	10	8	27	34	−7	18
10	Kohtla-Järve Keemik	22	5	5	12	21	36	−15	15
11	Jõhvi Kaevur (R)	22	6	3	13	32	48	−16	15
12	Narva Energoremont (R)	22	1	1	20	19	85	−66	3

(C) Champions; (R) Relegated
