= 1982 Estonian SSR Football Championship =

Estonian SSR Higher League
- Season: 1982
- Champions: Tempo; 3rd title

The 1982 Estonian SSR Football Championship was won by Tempo.

== League table ==
Pos	Team	Pld	W	D	L	GF	GA	GD	Pts
1	Tempo (C)	22	15	2	5	43	19	+24	32
2	Jõhvi Estonia Kaevandus	22	11	8	3	49	17	+32	30
3	Pärnu Kalakombinaat	22	11	8	3	51	22	+29	30
4	Norma	22	13	4	5	41	23	+18	30
5	Tallinna Dünamo	22	13	4	5	52	20	+32	30
6	Narva Baltika	22	10	8	4	25	15	+10	28
7	Dvigatel	22	7	5	10	27	34	−7	19
8	Sillamäe Kalev	22	8	2	12	28	36	−8	18
9	TPI Tallinn	22	6	6	10	26	36	−10	18
10	Kohtla-Järve Ehitaja	22	7	3	12	31	34	−3	17
11	FK Viljandi (R)	22	2	4	16	15	74	−59	8
12	Tallinna Elektrotehnika (R)	22	1	2	19	18	76	−58	4

(C) Champions; (R) Relegated
