= 1989 Estonian SSR Football Championship =

Estonian SSR Higher League
- Season: 1989
- Champions: Zvezda; 2nd title

The 1989 Estonian SSR Football Championship was won by Zvezda.

== League table ==
Pos	Team	Pld	W	D	L	GF	GA	GD	Pts	Qualification or relegation
1	Zvezda (C)	22	17	3	2	57	15	+42	37	Joined 1990 Baltic League for the next season
2	TVMK	22	16	3	3	62	20	+42	35	
3	Kalakombinaat/MEK	22	14	4	4	51	34	+17	32	
4	Kohtla-Järve Keemik	22	12	2	8	47	29	+18	26	
5	Eesti Põlevkivi Jõhvi	22	10	4	8	37	30	+7	24	
6	Norma	22	8	6	8	35	42	−7	22	
7	Dvigatel	22	8	1	13	34	44	−10	17	
8	Sillamäe Kalev	22	6	5	11	31	42	−11	17	
9	Narva Baltika	22	7	2	13	32	59	−27	16	
10	Tallinna Tempo	22	7	2	13	30	44	−14	16	
11	Narva Autobaas (R)	22	5	1	16	31	48	−17	11	
12	Eesti Tööstus/Flora (R)	22	4	3	15	22	62	−40	11	

(C) Champions; (R) Relegated
