= 1972 Estonian SSR Football Championship =

Estonian SSR Higher League
- Season: 1972
- Champions: Baltic Fleet Tallinn; 10th title

The 1972 Estonian SSR Football Championship was won by Baltic Fleet Tallinn.

== League table ==
Pos	Team	Pld	W	D	L	GF	GA	GD	Pts
1	Baltic Fleet Tallinn (C)	22	15	5	2	48	22	+26	35
2	Norma	22	10	9	3	35	24	+11	29
3	Kopli Dünamo	22	12	5	5	34	23	+11	29
4	Narva Baltika	22	9	6	7	29	21	+8	24
5	Tallinna Start	22	10	4	8	29	23	+6	24
6	Kohtla-Järve Keemik	22	7	6	9	29	29	0	20
7	Tempo	22	7	5	10	29	26	+3	19
8	Tallinna Tekstiil	22	6	7	9	27	32	−5	19
9	Tartu Remonditehas	22	8	3	11	28	42	−14	19
10	Dvigatel	22	7	4	11	24	30	−6	18
11	Valga Lokomotiv (R)	22	6	3	13	24	39	−15	15
12	Narva Kreenholm	22	4	5	13	21	44	−23	13

(C) Champions; (R) Relegated
