= 1975 Estonian SSR Football Championship =

Estonian SSR Higher League
- Season: 1975
- Champions: Narva Baltika; 2nd title

The 1975 Estonian SSR Football Championship was won by Narva Baltika.

== League table ==
| Pos | Team | Pld | W | D | L | GF | GA | GD | Pts |
|---|---|---|---|---|---|---|---|---|---|
| 1 | Narva Baltika (C) | 20 | 14 | 4 | 2 | 36 | 13 | +23 | 32 |
| 2 | Kopli Dünamo | 20 | 11 | 6 | 3 | 34 | 16 | +18 | 28 |
| 3 | Kohtla-Järve Keemik | 20 | 10 | 6 | 4 | 34 | 18 | +16 | 26 |
| 4 | Sillamäe Kalev | 20 | 9 | 4 | 7 | 37 | 25 | +12 | 22 |
| 5 | Norma | 20 | 9 | 4 | 7 | 31 | 25 | +6 | 22 |
| 6 | Dvigatel | 20 | 7 | 7 | 6 | 30 | 25 | +5 | 21 |
| 7 | Tempo | 20 | 7 | 4 | 9 | 29 | 28 | +1 | 18 |
| 8 | Tartu Remonditehas | 20 | 4 | 7 | 9 | 19 | 29 | −10 | 15 |
| 9 | Tallinna Tekstiil | 20 | 4 | 6 | 10 | 12 | 32 | −20 | 14 |
| 10 | Pärnu Kalev | 20 | 3 | 7 | 10 | 21 | 33 | −12 | 13 |
| 11 | Kohtla-Järve EPT (R) | 20 | 2 | 5 | 13 | 15 | 54 | −39 | 9 |
| 12 | Narva Kreenholm (Note: 12th team Narva Kreenholm withdrew) | 0 | 0 | 0 | 0 | 0 | 0 | 0 | 0 |

(C) Champions; (R) Relegated
