= 1986 Estonian SSR Football Championship =

Estonian SSR Higher League
- Season: 1986
- Champions: Zvezda; 1st title

The 1986 Estonian SSR Football Championship was won by Zvezda.

== League table ==
Pos	Team	Pld	W	D	L	GF	GA	GD	Pts
1	Zvezda (C)	22	18	4	0	56	16	+40	40
2	Norma	22	15	3	4	67	32	+35	33
3	Tempo	22	12	8	2	51	24	+27	32
4	Jõhvi Estonia Kaevandus	22	12	5	5	36	25	+11	29
5	Pärnu Kalakombinaat/MEK	22	11	4	7	54	37	+17	26
6	Kohtla-Järve Keemik	22	11	4	7	53	29	+24	26
7	Tallinna Elektrotehnik	22	9	4	9	34	31	+3	22
8	Kohtla-Järve RMT	22	6	6	10	24	43	−19	18
9	Sillamäe Kalev	22	6	5	11	26	43	−17	17
10	FK Viljandi	22	4	3	15	31	44	−13	11
11	Pärnu KEK (R)	22	2	2	18	16	69	−53	6
12	Tallinna KK Majak (R)	22	2	0	20	16	71	−55	4

(C) Champions; (R) Relegated
