= 1973 Estonian SSR Football Championship =

Estonian SSR Higher League
- Season: 1979
- Champions: Narva Kreenholm; 1st title

The 1979 Estonian SSR Football Championship was won by Narva Kreenholm.

== League table ==
| Pos | Team | Pld | W | D | L | GF | GA | GD | Pts |
|---|---|---|---|---|---|---|---|---|---|
| 1 | Narva Kreenholm (C) | 22 | 13 | 8 | 1 | 45 | 12 | +33 | 34 |
| 2 | Kopli Dünamo | 22 | 12 | 7 | 3 | 47 | 23 | +24 | 31 |
| 3 | Tempo | 22 | 12 | 4 | 6 | 33 | 27 | +6 | 28 |
| 4 | Narva Baltika | 22 | 9 | 6 | 7 | 35 | 29 | +6 | 24 |
| 5 | Sillamäe Kalev | 22 | 9 | 3 | 10 | 25 | 29 | −4 | 21 |
| 6 | Norma | 22 | 6 | 9 | 7 | 22 | 28 | −6 | 21 |
| 7 | Pärnu Kalev | 22 | 7 | 6 | 9 | 32 | 41 | −9 | 20 |
| 8 | Tallinna Tekstiil | 22 | 5 | 9 | 8 | 16 | 24 | −8 | 19 |
| 9 | Kohtla-Järve Keemik | 22 | 5 | 8 | 9 | 19 | 23 | −4 | 18 |
| 10 | Tartu Remonditehas | 22 | 6 | 6 | 10 | 20 | 26 | −6 | 18 |
| 11 | Tallinna Start (R) | 22 | 5 | 7 | 10 | 30 | 35 | −5 | 17 |
| 12 | Dvigatel (R) | 22 | 5 | 3 | 14 | 24 | 51 | −27 | 13 |

(C) Champions; (R) Relegated
