= 1952 Soviet Top League =

Soviet Top League
- Season: 1952

The 1952 Soviet Top League was the 15th season of top-tier football in the Soviet Union. A total of 14 teams competed in the league. FC Spartak Moscow emerged as champions, claiming their fifth Soviet title.

== Overview ==
The 1952 season marked a return to competitive football following the Soviet national team's disappointing performance at the 1952 Helsinki Olympics, where they were eliminated by Yugoslavia. This led to the temporary suspension of the entire CDSA team (today’s CSKA Moscow), which had provided the core of the national squad. As a result, CDSA did not participate in the 1952 season.

== Teams ==
14 teams competed in the league. Notably, Dynamo Leningrad and Shakhtyor Stalino (now Shakhtar Donetsk) were promoted to the top division for this season.

== Notable Events ==
The suspension of CDSA Moscow significantly altered the balance of competition.

Spartak Moscow’s victory reasserted their dominance during a politically sensitive year for Soviet football.

== League standings ==
Pos	Team	Pld	W	D	L	GF	GA	GD	Pts	Qualification
1	(Russian Soviet Federative Socialist Republic) Spartak Moscow (C)	13	9	2	2	26	12	+14	20	League champions
2	(Ukrainian Soviet Socialist Republic) Dynamo Kiev	13	7	3	3	26	14	+12	17	
3	(Russian Soviet Federative Socialist Republic) Dynamo Moscow	13	7	3	3	24	14	+10	17	
4	(Georgian Soviet Socialist Republic) Dynamo Tbilisi	13	5	6	2	19	12	+7	16	
5	(Russian Soviet Federative Socialist Republic) Dynamo Leningrad	13	5	5	3	17	17	0	15	
6	(Russian Soviet Federative Socialist Republic) Kalinin	13	5	4	4	19	19	0	14	
7	(Russian Soviet Federative Socialist Republic) Zenit Leningrad	13	6	2	5	20	21	−1	14	
8	(Russian Soviet Federative Socialist Republic) Krylia Sovetov Kuybyshev	13	5	3	5	16	14	+2	13	
9	(Russian Soviet Federative Socialist Republic) Lokomotiv Moscow	13	5	2	6	19	21	−2	12	
10	(Russian Soviet Federative Socialist Republic) Torpedo Moscow	13	3	6	4	11	15	−4	12	
11	(Russian Soviet Federative Socialist Republic) VVS Moscow (R)	13	2	6	5	11	14	−3	10	Relegation to Class B
12	(Latvian Soviet Socialist Republic) Daugava Riga (R)	13	2	5	6	10	14	−4	9	Relegation to Class B
13	(Ukrainian Soviet Socialist Republic) Shakhtyor Stalino (R)	13	1	6	6	14	26	−12	8	Relegation to Class B
14	(Byelorussian Soviet Socialist Republic) Dinamo Minsk (R)	13	1	3	9	10	29	−19	5	Relegation to Class B

Source: rsssf.com
(C) Champions; (R) Relegated

== Results ==
Home \ Away	DAU	DYK	DLE	DMN	DYN	DTB	KAL	KRY	LOK	SHA	SPA	TOR	VVS	ZEN
Daugava Riga		0–2		2–0			1–2		0–2					2–0
Dynamo Kiev				3–0		0–0	2–1		4–0	4–0		2–2		1–2
Dynamo Leningrad	2–1	3–1		4–2	0–5			2–1		1–1				
Dinamo Minsk									1–1	2–0				0–4
Dynamo Moscow	2–1	0–3		3–1		2–2	4–1	0–1	2–0	3–1	0–0	0–2	1–1	2–1
Dynamo Tbilisi	0–0		1–1	4–1					1–2	1–1		1–0	1–0	
Kalinin			0–1	2–1		1–1		1–0	4–2					1–1
Krylia Sovetov Kuybyshev	0–0	0–1	1–4	2–1										4–1
Lokomotiv Moscow			0–0					1–4		3–0	3–0		2–3	1–2
Shakhtyor Stalino	1–1						4–3	0–0					0–0	
Spartak Moscow	2–1	4–1	1–0	3–0		2–1	1–1	1–0		3–2			1–2	4–1
Torpedo Moscow	1–1		1–1	0–0			1–1	1–1	0–2	2–1	0–4		1–0	0–1
VVS Moscow	0–0			1–1	2–2		1–1	0–1	1–2					0–1
Zenit Leningrad			2–1			1–2				3–3				

Legend: Blue = home team win; Yellow = draw; Red = away team win.

== Top scorers ==
11 goals

- Andrei Zazroyev (Dynamo Kiev)

8 goals

- Vladimir Ilyin (Dynamo Moscow)
- Aleksei Paramonov (Spartak Moscow)

7 goals

- Avtandil Chkuaseli (Dinamo Tbilisi)

5 goals

- Vladimir Bogdanovich (Dynamo Kiev)
- Yuri Fetiskin (Kalinin)
- Vasili Fomin (Dynamo Leningrad)
- Aleksandr Ivanov (Zenit Leningrad)
- Aleksei Kolobov (Dynamo Leningrad)
- Nikita Simonyan (Spartak Moscow)
- Vladimir Tsvetkov (Dynamo Leningrad)

== Legacy ==
The 1952 season is often remembered not only for Spartak's triumph but also for the significant political implications football had within the USSR at the time, particularly following the fallout of the Helsinki Olympics.

== See also ==
- All-Union Committee of Physical Culture and Sports Tournament
