= 1966 Estonian SSR Football Championship =

Estonian SSR Higher League
- Season: 1966
- Champions: Baltic Fleet Tallinn; 8th title

The 1966 Estonian SSR Football Championship was won by Baltic Fleet Tallinn.

== League table ==
Pos	Team	Pld	W	D	L	GF	GA	GD	Pts
1	Baltic Fleet Tallinn (C)	18	14	2	2	44	10	+34	30
2	Norma	18	12	2	4	33	18	+15	26
3	Kohtla-Järve PK	18	11	3	4	28	18	+10	25
4	Tartu Remonditehas	18	7	6	5	30	18	+12	20
5	Kopli Dünamo	18	7	3	8	25	28	−3	17
6	Ülemiste Kalev	18	6	2	10	22	29	−7	14
7	Tempo	18	4	6	8	19	26	−7	14
8	Pärnu Kalev	18	4	5	9	19	34	−15	13
9	Narva Kreenholm	18	4	3	11	14	31	−17	11
10	Aseri Keraamikatehas	18	4	2	12	13	35	−22	10

(C) Champions
