= 1984 Estonian SSR Football Championship =

Estonian SSR Higher League
- Season: 1984
- Champions: Jõhvi Estonia Kaevandus; 1st title

The 1984 Estonian SSR Football Championship was won by Jõhvi Estonia Kaevandus.

== League table ==
Pos	Team	Pld	W	D	L	GF	GA	GD	Pts
1	Jõhvi Estonia Kaevandus (C)	22	18	2	2	69	22	+47	38
2	Tempo	22	18	1	3	49	19	+30	37
3	Tallinna Dünamo	22	16	2	4	70	20	+50	34
4	Pärnu Kalakombinaat	22	15	3	4	57	26	+31	33
5	Norma	22	12	3	7	55	32	+23	27
6	Sillamäe Kalev	22	9	3	10	39	32	+7	21
7	Narva Baltika	22	8	2	12	32	41	−9	18
8	Pärnu KEK	22	7	3	12	30	52	−22	17
9	Kohtla-Järve Keemik	22	4	4	14	22	34	−12	12
10	Dvigatel	22	5	2	15	24	63	−39	12
11	Narva Avtomobilist (R)	22	2	6	14	22	59	−37	10
12	Kiviõli Autoveod (R)	22	1	3	18	11	80	−69	5

(C) Champions; (R) Relegated
