= 1960 Estonian SSR Football Championship =

Estonian SSR Higher League
- Season: 1960
- Champions: Baltic Fleet Tallinn; 6th title

The 1960 Estonian SSR Football Championship was won by Baltic Fleet Tallinn.

== League table ==
| Pos | Team | Pld | W | D | L | GF | GA | GD | Pts |
|---|---|---|---|---|---|---|---|---|---|
| 1 | Baltic Fleet Tallinn (C) | 18 | 18 | 0 | 0 | 105 | 8 | +97 | 36 |
| 2 | Ülemiste Kalev | 18 | 10 | 4 | 4 | 44 | 25 | +19 | 24 |
| 3 | Narva Kreenholm | 18 | 8 | 7 | 3 | 43 | 27 | +16 | 23 |
| 4 | Norma | 18 | 7 | 6 | 5 | 31 | 31 | 0 | 20 |
| 5 | Pärnu Kalev | 18 | 8 | 1 | 9 | 33 | 38 | −5 | 17 |
| 6 | Rakvere Kalev | 18 | 5 | 5 | 8 | 23 | 25 | −2 | 15 |
| 7 | Kohtla-Järve PK | 18 | 5 | 5 | 8 | 25 | 54 | −29 | 15 |
| 8 | Türi Jõud | 18 | 5 | 3 | 10 | 18 | 47 | −29 | 13 |
| 9 | Tartu Kalev | 18 | 3 | 3 | 12 | 21 | 40 | −19 | 9 |
| 10 | Viljandi Jõud (R) | 18 | 2 | 4 | 12 | 17 | 65 | −48 | 8 |

(C) Champions; (R) Relegated
