= 1987 Estonian SSR Football Championship =

Estonian SSR Higher League
- Season: 1987
- Champions: Tempo; 4th title

The 1987 Estonian SSR Football Championship was won by Tempo.

== League table ==
Pos	Team	Pld	W	D	L	GF	GA	GD	Pts
1	Tempo (C)	22	17	3	2	55	17	+38	37
2	Jõhvi Estonia Kaevandus/RMT	22	17	2	3	54	19	+35	36
3	Zvezda	22	16	2	4	68	25	+43	34
4	Pärnu Kalakombinaat/MEK	22	14	2	6	50	26	+24	30
5	Norma	22	9	6	7	39	35	+4	24
6	Kohtla-Järve Keemik	22	11	2	9	37	33	+4	24
7	Sillamäe Kalev	22	8	4	10	32	41	−9	20
8	Tallinna Elektrotehnik	22	6	5	11	25	30	−5	17
9	FK Viljandi	22	5	3	14	29	67	−38	13
10	Tartu Kalev	22	4	4	14	27	51	−24	12
11	Narva Baltika (R)	22	3	4	15	22	59	−37	10
12	Narva Avtomobilist (R)	22	1	5	16	30	65	−35	7

(C) Champions; (R) Relegated
