= 1968 Estonian SSR Football Championship =

Estonian SSR Higher League
- Season: 1968
- Champions: Baltic Fleet Tallinn; 9th title

The 1968 Estonian SSR Football Championship was won by Baltic Fleet Tallinn.

== League table ==
Pos	Team	Pld	W	D	L	GF	GA	GD	Pts
1	Baltic Fleet Tallinn (C)	22	16	5	1	51	10	+41	37
2	Norma	22	15	5	2	54	18	+36	35
3	Tallinna Start	22	12	4	6	37	23	+14	28
4	Tallinna Tekstiil	22	10	6	6	35	36	−1	26
5	Narva Kreenholm	22	8	5	9	39	35	+4	21
6	Kohtla-Järve PK	22	8	5	9	24	34	−10	21
7	Tempo	22	7	6	9	33	38	−5	20
8	Ülemiste Kalev	22	6	6	10	31	39	−8	18
9	Jõhvi Kaevur	22	3	9	10	14	27	−13	15
10	Sillamäe Kalev	22	5	5	12	22	48	−26	15
11	Narva Energeetik	22	5	4	13	23	38	−15	14
12	Tartu Remonditehas (R)	22	3	8	11	27	44	−17	14

(C) Champions; (R) Relegated
