= 1963 Estonian SSR Football Championship =

Estonian SSR Higher League
- Season: 1963
- Champions: Tempo; 1st title

The 1963 Estonian SSR Football Championship was won by Tempo.

== League table ==
Pos	Team	Pld	W	D	L	GF	GA	GD	Pts
1	Tempo (C)	16	12	2	2	39	10	+29	26
2	Baltic Fleet Tallinn	16	10	2	4	45	19	+26	22
3	Aseri Kalev	16	9	3	4	24	19	+5	21
4	Norma	16	8	3	5	28	16	+12	19
5	Narva Kreenholm	16	6	2	8	28	31	−3	14
6	Kohtla-Järve Kalev	16	6	2	8	23	33	−10	14
7	Pärnu Kalev	16	4	3	9	23	39	−16	11
8	EAT Tallinn	16	4	2	10	24	51	−27	10
9	Kiviõli Kombinaat (R)	16	3	1	12	21	37	−16	7
DSQ	Ülemiste Kalev	0	0	0	0	0	0	0	0 (Note: Was removed from the tournament due to unsportsmanlike behavior five rounds before the end.)

(C) Champions; (R) Relegated
