= 1965 Estonian SSR Football Championship =

Football Championship

Estonian SSR Higher League
- Season: 1965
- Champions: Baltic Fleet Tallinn; 7th title

The 1965 Estonian SSR Football Championship was won by Baltic Fleet Tallinn.

== League table ==
Pos	Team	Pld	W	D	L	GF	GA	GD	Pts
1	Baltic Fleet Tallinn (C)	24	14	4	6	56	8	+48	32
2	Kopli Dünamo	18	8	8	2	33	14	+19	24
3	Tempo	18	10	4	4	32	17	+15	24
4	Norma	18	8	6	4	39	20	+19	22
5	Kohtla-Järve PK	18	8	4	6	32	24	+8	20
6	Narva Kreenholm	18	8	2	8	27	33	−6	18
7	Pärnu Kalev	18	5	3	10	24	35	−11	13
8	Tartu Remonditehas	18	5	3	10	25	41	−16	13
9	Valga Kalev (R)	18	2	3	13	14	29	−15	7
10	EAT Tallinn (R)	18	1	2	15	11	72	−61	4

(C) Champions; (R) Relegated
