= 1961 Estonian SSR Football Championship =

Estonian SSR Higher League
- Season: 1961
- Champions: Kopli Kalev; 1st title

The 1961 Estonian SSR Football Championship was won by Kopli Kalev.

== Championship play-off ==
| Pos | Team | Pld | W | D | L | GF | GA | GD | Pts |
|---|---|---|---|---|---|---|---|---|---|
| 1 | Kopli Kalev (C) | 14 | 10 | 2 | 2 | 39 | 12 | +27 | 22 |
| 2 | Pärnu Kalev | 14 | 8 | 4 | 2 | 37 | 14 | +23 | 20 |
| 3 | Ülemiste Kalev | 14 | 7 | 5 | 2 | 39 | 19 | +20 | 19 |
| 4 | Tallinna Taksopark | 14 | 7 | 2 | 5 | 16 | 16 | 0 | 16 |
| 5 | Norma | 14 | 6 | 3 | 5 | 33 | 14 | +19 | 15 |
| 6 | Rakvere Kalev | 14 | 6 | 3 | 5 | 28 | 48 | −20 | 15 |
| 7 | Tallinna Dünamo | 14 | 5 | 4 | 5 | 15 | 13 | +2 | 14 |
| 8 | Narva Kreenholm | 14 | 5 | 3 | 6 | 29 | 21 | +8 | 13 |

(C) Champions

== Bottom play-off ==
| Pos | Team | Pld | W | D | L | GF | GA | GD | Pts |
|---|---|---|---|---|---|---|---|---|---|
| 9 | Aseri Kalev | 14 | 9 | 0 | 5 | 39 | 20 | +19 | 18 |
| 10 | Kiviõli Kombinaat | 14 | 8 | 1 | 5 | 38 | 19 | +19 | 17 |
| 11 | Tartu Kalev | 14 | 6 | 2 | 6 | 30 | 22 | +8 | 14 |
| 12 | Kohtla-Järve PK | 14 | 5 | 3 | 6 | 28 | 26 | +2 | 13 |
| 13 | Türi Jõud | 14 | 5 | 2 | 7 | 33 | 33 | 0 | 12 |
| 14 | SAM Viljandi | 14 | 4 | 0 | 10 | 14 | 50 | −36 | 8 |
| 15 | Tallinna Kalev II (R) | 14 | 2 | 2 | 10 | 13 | 30 | −17 | 6 |
| 16 | Tallinna Dünamo II (R) | 14 | 1 | 0 | 13 | 11 | 74 | −63 | 2 |

(R) Relegated
