= 1958 Estonian SSR Football Championship =

Estonian SSR Higher League
- Season: 1958
- Champions: Ülemiste Kalev; 2nd title

The 1958 Estonian SSR Football Championship was won by Ülemiste Kalev.

== League table ==
Pos	Team	Pld	W	D	L	GF	GA	GD	Pts
1	Ülemiste Kalev (C)	18	14	2	2	66	14	+52	30
2	Baltic Fleet Tallinn	18	12	4	2	66	20	+46	28
3	Narva Kalev	18	13	0	5	42	19	+23	26
4	Tallinna Punane Koit	18	9	5	4	29	21	+8	23
5	Viljandi Spartak	18	7	4	7	35	43	−8	18
6	Pärnu Kalev	18	8	1	9	34	41	−7	17
7	Rakvere Kalev	18	7	3	8	28	39	−11	17
8	Tartu Dünamo	18	5	1	12	17	44	−27	11
9	Tallinna Dünamo II (R)	18	2	2	14	15	41	−26	6
10	Kiviõli Kalev (R)	18	1	2	15	16	66	−50	4

(C) Champions; (R) Relegated
