= 1969 Estonian SSR Football Championship =

Estonian SSR Higher League
- Season: 1969
- Champions: Dvigatel; 1st title

The 1969 Estonian SSR Football Championship was won by Dvigatel.

== League table ==
Pos	Team	Pld	W	D	L	GF	GA	GD	Pts
1	Dvigatel (C)	24	16	6	2	51	18	+33	38
2	Norma	24	17	3	4	49	24	+25	37
3	Baltic Fleet Tallinn	24	15	6	3	72	22	+50	36
4	Kopli Dünamo	24	14	4	6	37	18	+19	32
5	Tempo	24	10	7	7	31	26	+5	27
6	Tallinna Start	24	10	5	9	32	27	+5	25
7	Narva Kreenholm	24	11	2	11	34	36	−2	24
8	Tallinna Tekstiil	24	8	6	10	33	33	0	22
9	Türi Jõud	24	8	6	10	22	36	−14	22
10	Kohtla-Järve Keemik	24	5	3	16	19	45	−26	13
11	Jõhvi Kaevur	24	2	9	13	22	51	−29	13
12	Sillamäe Kalev (R)	24	3	6	15	25	46	−21	12
13	Narva Energeetik (R)	24	5	1	18	23	69	−46	11

(C) Champions; (R) Relegated
