= 1956 Estonian SSR Football Championship =

Estonian SSR Higher League
- Season: 1956
- Champions: Baltic Fleet Tallinn; 5th title

The 1956 Estonian SSR Football Championship was won by Baltic Fleet Tallinn.

== League table ==
Pos	Team	Pld	W	D	L	GF	GA	GD	Pts
1	Baltic Fleet Tallinn (C)	16	13	0	3	65	16	+49	26
2	Viljandi Spartak	16	12	1	3	41	14	+27	25
3	Narva Kalev	16	12	0	4	45	18	+27	24
4	Tallinna Kalev	16	6	3	7	29	31	−2	15
5	Tartu Dünamo	16	6	2	8	31	31	0	14
6	Rakvere Kalev	16	5	2	9	25	45	−20	12
7	Pärnu Kalev	16	6	0	10	23	49	−26	12
8	Järvakandi Kalev	16	5	1	10	18	29	−11	11
9	Kiviõli Kalev (R)	16	1	3	12	14	58	−44	5

(C) Champions; (R) Relegated
