= 1957 Estonian SSR Football Championship =

Estonian SSR Higher League
- Season: 1957
- Champions: Ülemiste Kalev; 1st title

The 1957 Estonian SSR Football Championship was won by Ülemiste Kalev.

== League table ==
Pos	Team	Pld	W	D	L	GF	GA	GD	Pts
1	Ülemiste Kalev (C)	18	15	3	0	62	16	+46	33
2	Rakvere Kalev	18	12	2	4	42	38	+4	26
3	Narva Kalev	18	9	1	8	38	23	+15	19
4	Baltic Fleet Tallinn	18	8	3	7	40	30	+10	19
5	Tallinna Punane Koit	18	7	4	7	43	37	+6	18
6	Tartu Dünamo	18	6	2	10	32	41	−9	14
7	Viljandi Spartak	18	4	6	8	27	38	−11	14
8	Pärnu Kalev	18	4	6	8	24	48	−24	14
9	Järvakandi Kalev (R)	18	5	2	11	17	42	−25	12
10	Sillamäe Kalev (R)	18	4	3	11	22	44	−22	11

(C) Champions; (R) Relegated
