= 1971 Estonian SSR Football Championship =

Estonian SSR Higher League
- Season: 1971
- Champions: Tempo; 2nd title

The 1971 Estonian SSR Football Championship was won by Tempo.

== League table ==
Pos	Team	Pld	W	D	L	GF	GA	GD	Pts
1	Tempo (C)	21	12	6	3	38	17	+21	30
2	Kopli Dünamo	21	12	5	4	39	25	+14	29
3	Tallinna Start	21	11	6	4	31	25	+6	28
4	Norma	21	9	7	5	34	15	+19	25
5	Dvigatel	21	10	5	6	31	21	+10	25
6	Narva Kreenholm	21	8	7	6	31	20	+11	23
7	Valga Lokomotiv	21	8	7	6	22	23	−1	23
8	Kohtla-Järve Keemik	21	7	6	8	22	20	+2	20
9	Baltic Fleet Tallinn	21	8	1	12	35	34	+1	17
10	Tallinna Tekstiil	21	4	5	12	26	37	−11	13
11	Pärnu Kalev (R)	21	3	2	16	24	58	−34	8
12	Jõhvi Kaevur (R)	11	0	1	10	5	43	−38	1 (Note: withdrew after first round.)

(C) Champions; (R) Relegated
