= 1977 Estonian SSR Football Championship =

Estonian SSR Higher League
- Season: 1977
- Champions: Narva Baltika; 3rd title

The 1977 Estonian SSR Football Championship was won by Narva Baltika.

== League table ==
Pos	Team	Pld	W	D	L	GF	GA	GD	Pts
1	Narva Baltika (C)	22	14	4	4	45	18	+27	32
2	Dvigatel	22	10	8	4	30	14	+16	28
3	Tallinna Dünamo	22	10	8	4	36	20	+16	28
4	Sillamäe Kalev	22	11	5	6	30	17	+13	27
5	Aseri SK	22	10	5	7	32	19	+13	25
6	Kohtla-Järve Keemik	22	8	9	5	29	21	+8	25
7	Pärnu Kalakombinaat	22	9	3	10	30	34	−4	21
8	Tempo	22	6	6	10	35	42	−7	18
9	Norma	22	5	6	11	18	29	−11	16
10	Jõhvi Estonia Kaevandus	22	5	6	11	24	44	−20	16
11	Tartu Remonditehas (R)	22	4	6	12	22	40	−18	14
12	Narva Energeetik (R)	22	4	3	15	17	50	−33	11

(C) Champions; (R) Relegated
