= 1967 Estonian SSR Football Championship =

Estonian SSR Higher League
- Season: 1967
- Champions: Norma; 2nd title

The 1967 Estonian SSR Football Championship was won by Norma.

== League table ==
Pos	Team	Pld	W	D	L	GF	GA	GD	Pts
1	Norma (C)	22	17	3	2	55	15	+40	37
2	Baltic Fleet Tallinn	22	16	3	3	62	20	+42	35
3	Tartu Remonditehas	22	10	7	5	35	26	+9	27
4	Ülemiste Kalev	22	7	10	5	31	25	+6	24
5	Tempo	22	9	5	8	40	37	+3	23
6	Tallinna Tekstiil	22	9	5	8	30	25	+5	23
7	Narva Kreenholm	22	7	8	7	35	30	+5	22
8	Kopli Dünamo	22	8	6	8	24	30	−6	22
9	Narva Energeetik	22	3	10	9	25	34	−9	16
10	Kohtla-Järve PK	22	4	7	11	21	38	−17	15
11	Pärnu Kalev (R)	22	4	3	15	15	46	−31	11
12	Aseri Keraamikatehas (R)	22	3	3	16	21	68	−47	9

(C) Champions; (R) Relegated
