= 1988 Estonian SSR Football Championship =

Estonian SSR Higher League
- Season: 1988
- Champions: Norma; 5th title

The 1988 Estonian SSR Football Championship was won by Norma.

== League table ==
| Pos | Team | Pld | W | D | L | GF | GA | GD | Pts |
|---|---|---|---|---|---|---|---|---|---|
| 1 | Norma (C) | 22 | 17 | 2 | 3 | 64 | 12 | +52 | 36 |
| 2 | Kohtla-Järve Keemik | 22 | 15 | 3 | 4 | 53 | 27 | +26 | 33 |
| 3 | Kalakombinaat/MEK | 22 | 14 | 3 | 5 | 44 | 26 | +18 | 31 |
| 4 | Eesti Põlevkivi Jõhvi | 22 | 12 | 6 | 4 | 33 | 18 | +15 | 30 |
| 5 | Zvezda | 22 | 13 | 2 | 7 | 49 | 24 | +25 | 28 |
| 6 | TVMK | 22 | 11 | 4 | 7 | 61 | 40 | +21 | 26 |
| 7 | Tempo | 22 | 11 | 3 | 8 | 40 | 40 | 0 | 25 |
| 8 | Dvigatel | 22 | 5 | 6 | 11 | 42 | 53 | −11 | 16 |
| 9 | Sillamäe Kalev | 22 | 8 | 0 | 14 | 37 | 58 | −21 | 16 |
| 10 | Viljandi FK | 22 | 4 | 4 | 14 | 36 | 70 | −34 | 12 |
| 11 | Lõvid-Flora (R) | 22 | 3 | 1 | 18 | 40 | 66 | −26 | 7 |
| 12 | Tartu Kalev (R) | 22 | 2 | 0 | 20 | 17 | 76 | −59 | 4 |

(C) Champions; (R) Relegated
