= 1964 Estonian SSR Football Championship =

Estonian SSR Higher League
- Season: 1964
- Champions: Norma; 1st title

The 1964 Estonian SSR Football Championship was won by Norma.

== League table ==
Pos	Team	Pld	W	D	L	GF	GA	GD	Pts
1	Norma (C)	18	12	4	2	38	12	+26	28
2	Tempo	18	9	6	3	20	13	+7	24
3	Baltic Fleet Tallinn	18	7	6	5	31	13	+18	20
4	Kopli Dünamo	18	6	7	5	14	11	+3	19
5	Valga Kalev	18	5	7	6	12	15	−3	17
6	Kohtla-Järve PK	18	5	6	7	26	20	+6	16
7	Narva Kreenholm	18	5	6	7	28	38	−10	16
8	Pärnu Kalev	18	5	5	8	15	27	−12	15
9	Ülemiste Kalev (R)	18	3	8	7	19	18	+1	14
10	Aseri Keraamikatehas (R)	18	3	5	10	13	49	−36	11

(C) Champions; (R) Relegated
