= 1979 Estonian SSR Football Championship =

Estonian SSR Higher League
- Season: 1979
- Champions: Norma; 4th title

The 1979 Estonian SSR Football Championship was won by Norma.

== League table ==
Pos	Team	Pld	W	D	L	GF	GA	GD	Pts
1	Norma (C)	20	12	6	2	34	16	+18	30
2	Tallinna Dünamo	20	13	3	4	40	13	+27	29
3	Sillamäe Kalev	20	10	6	4	29	17	+12	26
4	Tempo	20	7	8	5	18	14	+4	22
5	Narva Baltika	20	9	3	8	31	24	+7	21
6	Kohtla-Järve Keemik	20	7	6	7	29	20	+9	20
7	Jõhvi Estonia Kaevandus	20	7	5	8	32	29	+3	19
8	Pärnu Kalakombinaat	20	6	5	9	25	30	−5	17
9	Tartu Katseremonditehas	20	6	4	10	32	38	−6	16
10	Dvigatel	20	7	2	11	23	42	−19	16
11	TPI Tallinn (R)	20	0	4	16	21	71	−50	4
12	Aseri SK (R)	0	0	0	0	0	0	0	0 (Note: withdrew after first round)

(C) Champions; (R) Relegated
