= 1970 Estonian SSR Football Championship =

Estonian SSR Higher League
- Season: 1970
- Champions: Norma; 3rd title

The 1970 Estonian SSR Football Championship was won by Norma.

== League table ==
Pos	Team	Pld	W	D	L	GF	GA	GD	Pts
1	Norma (C)	22	14	6	2	42	9	+33	34
2	Narva Kreenholm	22	13	2	7	35	19	+16	28
3	Kohtla-Järve Keemik	22	11	6	5	32	19	+13	28
4	Tallinna Tekstiil	22	10	8	4	27	15	+12	28
5	Dvigatel	22	10	6	6	35	21	+14	26
6	Baltic Fleet Tallinn	22	10	5	7	38	25	+13	25
7	Tallinna Start	22	9	6	7	40	21	+19	24
8	Tempo	22	8	7	7	33	22	+11	23
9	Tallinna Dünamo	22	5	6	11	27	36	−9	16
10	Jõhvi Kaevur	22	5	4	13	19	53	−34	14
11	Türi Jõud (R)	22	4	3	15	11	58	−47	11
12	Tartu Remonditehas (R)	22	2	3	17	7	48	−41	7

(C) Champions; (R) Relegated
