= 1948 Estonian SSR Football Championship =

Estonian SSR Higher League
- Season: 1948
- Champions: Baltic Fleet Tallinn; 2nd title

The 1948 Estonian SSR Football Championship was won by Baltic Fleet Tallinn.

== League table ==
Pos	Team	Pld	W	D	L	GF	GA	GD	Pts
1	Baltic Fleet Tallinn (C)	14	9	4	1	35	16	+19	22
2	Pärnu Kalev	14	9	2	3	23	15	+8	20
3	Tartu Kalev	14	7	5	2	33	16	+17	19
4	Rakvere Dünamo	14	4	5	5	24	22	+2	13
5	Tallinna Esto	14	5	3	6	22	28	−6	13
6	Viljandi Dünamo	14	4	3	7	30	28	+2	11
7	Tallinna Dünamo II	14	4	3	7	14	24	−10	11
8	Tallinna Kalev II	14	1	1	12	11	43	−32	3

(C) Champions
