= Vladimir Tsvetkov =

Bulgarian footballer

Personal information
- Position: Forward

International career
Years	Team	Apps	(Gls)
1927	Bulgaria	2	(0)

Vladimir Tsvetkov was a Bulgarian footballer. He played in two matches for the Bulgaria national football team in 1927. He was also part of Bulgaria's squad for the football tournament at the 1924 Summer Olympics, but he did not play in any matches.
