= 1951 Estonian SSR Football Championship =

Estonian SSR Higher League
- Season: 1951
- Champions: Baltic Fleet Tallinn; 3rd title

The 1951 Estonian SSR Football Championship was won by Baltic Fleet Tallinn.

== League table ==
Pos	Team	Pld	W	D	L	GF	GA	GD	Pts
1	Baltic Fleet Tallinn (C)	18	15	2	1	71	10	+61	32
2	Tallinna Dünamo	18	14	4	0	70	10	+60	32
3	Soviet Air Forces Club Sokol	18	9	4	5	36	20	+16	22
4	Narva Kalev	18	9	3	6	35	37	−2	21
5	Pärnu Kalev	18	7	2	9	25	40	−15	16
6	Kohtla-Järve Kalev	18	5	4	9	27	45	−18	14
7	Rakvere Dünamo	18	4	5	9	23	47	−24	13
8	Tallinna Spartak	18	5	1	12	21	50	−29	11
9	Tartu ÜSK	18	4	2	12	21	56	−35	10
10	Viljandi Dünamo	18	3	3	12	24	38	−14	9

(C) Champions

== Title play-off ==
Baltic Fleet Tallinn	1 – 0	Tallinna Dünamo
