= 1969 Soviet Class B =

Second League
- Season: 1969

1969 Soviet Class B was a Soviet football competition at the Soviet third tier.

== Russian Federation ==
=== Semifinal Group 1 ===
[Maykop]

Pos	Team	Pld	W	D	L	GF	GA	GD	Pts
1	Druzhba Maykop	3	3	0	0	9	2	+7	6
2	Dinamo Gorkiy	3	2	0	1	6	3	+3	4
3	Fili Moskva	3	1	0	2	2	7	−5	2
4	Znamya Truda Orekhovo-Zuyevo	3	0	0	3	0	5	−5	0

=== Semifinal Group 2 ===
[Kislovodsk]

Pos	Team	Pld	W	D	L	GF	GA	GD	Pts
1	Narzan Kislovodsk	3	2	1	0	5	3	+2	5
2	Motor Vladimir	3	2	0	1	7	3	+4	4
3	Stroitel Sochi	3	1	0	2	3	4	−1	2
4	Soyuz Moskva	3	0	1	2	2	7	−5	1

=== Semifinal Group 3 ===
[Kiselyovsk]

Pos	Team	Pld	W	D	L	GF	GA	GD	Pts
1	Shakhtyor Kiselyovsk	3	2	1	0	7	0	+7	5
2	Neftyanik Bugulma	3	1	1	1	6	5	+1	3
3	Meteor Zhukovskiy	3	1	1	1	5	5	0	3
4	Krasny Treugolnik Leningrad	3	0	1	2	3	11	−8	1

=== Semifinal Group 4 ===
[Novorossiysk]

Pos	Team	Pld	W	D	L	GF	GA	GD	Pts
1	Cement Novorossiysk	3	2	0	1	5	4	+1	4
1	Kord Balakovo	3	2	0	1	4	3	+1	4
3	Khimik Novomoskovsk	3	1	0	2	2	3	−1	2
4	Dinamo Kirov	3	1	0	2	3	4	−1	2

Play-off for 1st place:

Cement Novorossiysk  2-1  Kord Balakovo  [aet]

=== Semifinal Group 5 ===
[Smolensk]

Pos	Team	Pld	W	D	L	GF	GA	GD	Pts
1	Iskra Smolensk	3	3	0	0	8	1	+7	6
2	Rybak Nakhodka	3	1	1	1	3	3	0	3
3	Metallurg Zlatoust	3	1	0	2	4	5	−1	2
4	Dinamo-d Leningrad	3	0	1	2	4	10	−6	1

=== Semifinal Group 6 ===
[Rybinsk]

Pos	Team	Pld	W	D	L	GF	GA	GD	Pts
1	Saturn Rybinsk	3	3	0	0	7	1	+6	6
2	Urozhai Slavyansk-na-Kubani	3	2	0	1	5	2	+3	4
3	Vympel Kaliningrad (M.R.)	3	1	0	2	4	6	−2	2
4	Metallurg Novokuznetsk	3	0	0	3	2	9	−7	0

=== Final Group ===
[Oct 28 – Nov 10, Maykop]

Pos	Team	Pld	W	D	L	GF	GA	GD	Pts
1	Druzhba Maykop	5	3	2	0	7	2	+5	8
1	Saturn Rybinsk	5	4	0	1	10	6	+4	8
3	Iskra Smolensk	5	3	0	2	6	4	+2	6
4	Cement Novorossiysk	5	1	2	2	5	6	−1	4
5	Shakhtyor Kiselyovsk	5	1	1	3	3	6	−3	3
6	Narzan Kislovodsk	5	0	1	4	5	12	−7	1

Play-off for 1st place:

Druzhba Maykop  1-0  Saturn Rybinsk

== Ukraine ==
=== Final group ===
[Oct 25 – Nov 2, Ivano-Frankovsk]

Pos	Team	Pld	W	D	L	GF	GA	GD	Pts
1	Spartak Ivano-Frankovsk	5	4	1	0	9	3	+6	9
2	Shakhtyor Gorlovka	5	3	1	1	5	2	+3	7
3	Spartak Sumy	5	3	0	2	5	5	0	6
4	Karpaty Mukachevo	6	2	1	3	6	5	+1	5
5	Prometei Dneprodzerzhinsk	5	1	0	4	3	7	−4	2
6	Shakhtyor Sverdlovsk	5	0	1	4	2	8	−6	1

== Caucasus ==
Pos	Rep	Team	Pld	W	D	L	GF	GA	GD	Pts
1	GEO	Dila Gori	38	20	14	4	70	24	+46	54
2	GEO	Guria Lanchkhuti	38	21	7	10	54	30	+24	49
3	ARM	Avtomobilist Yerevan	38	21	7	10	56	35	+21	49
4	GEO	Mertskhali Makharadze	38	18	11	9	55	28	+27	47
5	GEO	Metallurg Rustavi	38	15	16	7	53	32	+21	46
6	AZE	Textilshchik Mingechaur	38	16	10	12	53	48	+5	42
7	ARM	Lori Kirovakan	38	17	5	16	40	39	+1	39
8	GEO	Kakheti Telavi (Note: Nadikvari Telavi changed name to Kakheti.)	38	15	8	15	47	48	−1	38
9	ARM	Lernagorts Kafan	38	18	2	18	44	67	−23	38
10	GEO	Alazani Gurjaani	38	13	11	14	34	36	−2	37
11	GEO	Shukura Kobuleti	38	14	7	17	39	41	−2	35
12	AZE	Dashgin Zakatali	38	13	9	16	36	58	−22	35
13	ARM	Sevan Oktemberyan	38	12	10	16	44	47	−3	34
14	GEO	Inguri Zugdidi	38	13	8	17	46	56	−10	34
15	GEO	Kolkhida Poti	38	10	13	15	32	41	−9	33
16	GEO	Magaroeli Chiatura	38	13	7	18	34	46	−12	33
17	AZE	Karabakh Stepanakert	38	10	12	16	30	46	−16	32
18	GEO	Dinamo Sukhumi	38	12	7	19	50	46	+4	31
19	GEO	Spartak Tskhinvali	38	8	13	17	30	48	−18	29
20	AZE	Araz Nahichevan	38	8	9	21	18	49	−31	25

== Kazakhstan ==
Pos	Team	Pld	W	D	L	GF	GA	GD	Pts
1	Traktor Pavlodar	40	27	11	2	88	19	+69	65
2	Cementnik Semipalatinsk	40	24	11	5	61	24	+37	59
3	Yenbek Jezkazgan	40	24	10	6	44	20	+24	58
4	Energetik Jambul	40	21	13	6	62	29	+33	55
5	Stroitel Temirtau (Note: Metallurg Temirtau changed name to Stroitel.)	40	20	11	9	49	30	+19	51
6	ADK Alma-Ata	40	21	8	11	51	33	+18	50
7	Stroitel Rudny	40	14	17	9	36	33	+3	45
8	Irtysh Glubokoye	40	15	14	11	33	26	+7	44
9	Dinamo Tselinograd	40	16	11	13	48	37	+11	43
10	Avtomobilist Kustanay	40	14	15	11	32	28	+4	43
11	Khimik Stepnogorsk (Note: Aray Stepnogorsk changed name to Khimik.)	40	13	16	11	31	38	−7	42
12	Uralets Uralsk	40	13	15	12	40	46	−6	41
13	Leninogorets Leninogorsk	40	14	8	18	37	44	−7	36
14	Torpedo Kokchetav	40	11	10	19	32	42	−10	32
15	Metallurg Yermak	40	7	17	16	24	44	−20	31
16	Avangard Petropavlovsk	40	7	16	17	21	49	−28	30
17	Avtomobilist Kzil-Orda	40	10	6	24	31	59	−28	26
18	Ugolshchik Shakhtinsk	40	5	15	20	21	59	−38	25
19	Phosphorite Karatau	40	7	10	23	29	77	−48	24
20	Gornyak Kentau	40	5	13	22	29	59	−30	23
21	Aktyubinets Aktyubinsk (W)	40	6	5	29	19	22	−3	17

(W) Withdrawn

== Central Asia ==
Pos	Rep	Team	Pld	W	D	L	GF	GA	GD	Pts
1	UZB	TashAvtoMash Tashkent	46	25	16	5	82	38	+44	66
2	UZB	Samarkand	46	23	15	8	70	37	+33	61
3	UZB	Yangiyer	46	22	14	10	56	35	+21	58
4	KGZ	Alay Osh	46	24	9	13	71	41	+30	57
5	UZB	SKA Tashkent	46	21	14	11	61	35	+26	56
6	TJK	Pahtakor Kurgan-Tyube	46	19	17	10	75	55	+20	55
7	UZB	Ok Oltyn Andizhan Region	46	20	15	11	57	41	+16	55
8	TKM	Irrigator Charjou	46	19	15	12	57	41	+16	53
9	UZB	Pahtaaral Gulistan	46	20	10	16	53	49	+4	50
10	UZB	Chust Namangan	46	21	8	17	49	51	−2	50
11	UZB	Andizhanets Andizhan (Note: Andizhan changed name to Andizhanets.)	46	18	12	16	61	60	+1	48
12	UZB	Dimitrovets Tashkent Region (Note: Akkurgan Tashkent Region changed name to Dimitrovets.)	46	16	14	16	45	42	+3	46
13	TKM	Kara-Kum Mary	46	14	17	15	52	56	−4	45
14	UZB	Mehnat Kokand	46	15	13	18	50	54	−4	43
15	TJK	Abremshimchi Leninabad	46	14	14	18	42	50	−8	42
16	UZB	Avtomobilist Termez (Note: Chigarachi Termaz changed name to Avtomobilist.)	46	13	16	17	48	68	−20	42
17	UZB	Metallurg Almalyk	46	14	13	19	42	42	0	41
18	UZB	Kolkhoz Narimanova Bagat	46	14	11	21	36	52	−16	39
19	KGZ	Stroitel Jalalabad	46	13	9	24	38	63	−25	35
20	UZB	Buhara (Note: Fakel Buhara changed name to Buhara.)	46	10	13	23	29	52	−23	33
21	UZB	Khimik Chirchik	46	9	15	22	37	60	−23	33
22	TJK	Vakhsh Nurek	46	7	19	20	26	51	−25	33
23	UZB	Pahtachi Gulistan	46	13	7	26	37	73	−36	33
24	UZB	Cementchi Bekabad (Note: Bekabad changed name to Cementchi Bekabad.)	46	6	18	22	36	64	−28	30

Source: rsssf.com
