= 1953 Soviet Cup =

1953 Cup of USSR in Football
Кубок СССР

Tournament details
- Country: Soviet Union
- Dates: September 2 – October 10
- Teams: 56

Final positions
- Champions: Dinamo Moscow
- Runners-up: Zenit Kuybyshev

The 1953 Soviet Cup was an association football cup competition of the Soviet Union.

No teams representing the Soviet Armed Forces participated in the tournament due to the death of Stalin and changes in the Soviet government. That was the second year in the row for CSKA Moscow being barred from the competition.

== Participating teams ==
Enter in First round
Class A 11/11 teams	Class B 27/27 teams		Republican 18 teams
✓ Spartak Moscow; ✓ Dinamo Tbilisi; ✓ Torpedo Moscow; ✓ Dinamo Moscow; ✓ Zenit Leningrad; ✓ Lokomotiv Moscow; ✓ Krylia Sovetov Kuibyshev; ✓ Dinamo Kiev; ✓ Lokomotiv Kharkov; ✓ Dinamo Leningrad; ✓ Spartak Vilnius	✓ Dynamo Minsk; ✓ Torpedo Gorkiy; ✓ Shakhter Stalino; ✓ Znamia Ivanovo; ✓ Dinamo Yerevan; ✓ Spartak Tbilisi; ✓ Metallurg Odessa; ✓ Torpedo Rostov-na-Donu; ✓ Metallurg Zaporozhye; ✓ Zenit Moscow; ✓ Neftianik Baku; ✓ Torpedo Stalingrad; ✓ Daugava Riga	✓ Avangard (Dzerzhinets) Chelyabinsk; ✓ Dinamo Alma-Ata; ✓ Burevestnik Kishenev; ✓ Molotov; ✓ Spartak Ashkhabad; ✓ Avangard Sverdlovsk; ✓ Kalev Tallinn; ✓ Spartak Tashkent; ✓ Metallurg Dnepropetrovsk; ✓ Spartak Kalinin; ✓ Iskra Frunze; ✓ Khimik Moscow; ✓ Krasnaya Zvezda Petrozavodsk; ✓ Leninabad	✓ Dinamo Petrozavodsk (Karelia); ✓ Dinamo Tallinn (Estonia); ✓ Krasny Metallurg Liyepaya (Latvia); ✓ Lima Kaunas (Lithuania); ✓ Spartak Minsk (Belarus); ✓ Torpedo Kirovograd (Ukraine); ✓ Dinamo Kishenev (Moldova); ✓ Dinamo Kutaisi (Georgia); ✓ Khimik Kirovakan (Armenia); ✓ Dinamo Baku (Azerbaijan); ✓ Dinamo Chimkent (Kazakhstan); ✓ Khimik Chirchik (Uzbekistan); ✓ Dinamo Frunze (Kirgizia); ✓ Dinamo Stalinabad (Tajikistan); ✓ Lokomotyv Mary (Turkmenia); ✓ Torpedo Vladimir (RSFSR); ✓ Dinamo-2 Moscow; ✓ Dinamo-2 Leningrad

Source: []

== Competition schedule ==
=== First round ===
[Jul 23] 
SPARTAK Tashkent             1-0  Spartak Tbilisi 
  [Y.Golenbaum] 
[Aug 30] 
DINAMO Kutaisi               1-0  Torpedo Gorkiy 
  [G.Mekvabishvili] 
Torpedo Kirovograd           1-2  AVANGARD Sverdlovsk 
  [Viktor Tretyakov – V.Listochkin, Kozhevnikov] 
Torpedo Vladimir             1-2  DINAMO Alma-Ata               [aet] 
Zenit Kaliningrad (M.R.)     0-1  TORPEDO Stalingrad 
  [Dubovitskiy] 
[Sep 3] 
Metallurg Chimkent           1-4  METALLURG Zaporozhye     [in Guryev] 
  [Golubev – Malakhov-2, K.Pavlov, P.Ponomaryov] 
[Sep 4] 
Dinamo Tallinn               1-2  KHIMIK Moskva 
  [Pillu 72 – Krutikov 52, Savin 56] 
SPARTAK Ashkhabad            4-1  Metallurg Odessa 
  [S.Maduntsev 27, 28, M.Borkin 40, V.Yepikhin 77 – M.Cherkasskiy 70] 
[Sep 5] 
DINAMO-2 Leningrad           3-1  Kalev Tallinn 
  [S.Kornilov, D.Nikolin, Subbotin – Nell] 
[Sep 6] 
DINAMO Frunze                w/o  Krasnoye Znamya Ivanovo 
DINAMO Kishinev              w/o  Dinamo Minsk 
DINAMO Petrozavodsk          w/o  Dinamo Yerevan 
Dinamo Stalinabad            3-3  Avangard Chelyabinsk 
  [F.Rukavishnikov, N.Dolzhnikov, K.Shakirov – Semyonov, Ivanov, Tufatulin] 
KHIMIK Kirovakan             1-0  Spartak Kalinin 
  [A.Mkhoyan] 
KRASNY METALLURG Liepaja     3-0  Krylya Sovetov Molotov 
NEFTYANIK Baku               4-2  Krasnaya Zvezda Petrozavodsk 
  [Yuriy Kuznetsov-2, Timakov-2 – Nikiforov, Chumichov]

==== First round replays ====
[Sep 7] 
Dinamo Stalinabad            1-3  AVANGARD Chelyabinsk 
  [N.Dolzhnikov – Zhenishek, Tufatulin, Ahmanayev]

=== Second round ===
[Aug 23] 
Lima Kaunas                  0-4  METALLURG Dnepropetrovsk 
  [Shikov-2, Kozachenko, G.Ponomaryov] 
Spartak Minsk                1-2  ISKRA Frunze 
  [Vorobyov - ?] 
[Aug 24] 
Lokomotiv Mary               0-9  SHAKHTYOR Stalino        [in Ashkhabad] 
  [Ivan Boboshko-2, A.Koloskov-2, Ivan Fedosov-2, V.Churikov-2, V.Samoilov] 
[Aug 28] 
Dinamo Baku                  2-5  TORPEDO Rostov-na-Donu 
  [Tsaritsyn, Dmitriyev – A.Grigoryev-2, V.Kruglov-2, G.Fursov] 
[Sep 6] 
Khimik Chirchik              0-3  DAUGAVA Riga 
  [Y.Balykin, B.Reingold, Alfons Jegers] 
[Sep 7] 
Spartak Tashkent             0-0  Dinamo Kutaisi 
[Sep 10] 
Dinamo Kishinev              1-1  Dinamo Alma-Ata 
  [Starostin – Mezhov] 
[Sep 12] 
BUREVESTNIK Kishinev         3-0  Dinamo-2 Leningrad 
  [Kornilov, Bakhmutov, Pyatkovskiy] 
Neftyanik Baku               1-1  Khimik Moskva 
  [Abil-Zade 13 pen – Krutikov ?] 
[Sep 13] 
AVANGARD Chelyabinsk         w/o  Dinamo Yerevan       
GORNYAK Leninabad            w/o  Avangard Sverdlovsk 
METALLURG Zaporozhye         8-3  Khimik Kirovakan 
  [O.Kiknadze-2, K.Pavlov-2, P.Ponomaryov-2, B.Zozulya, I.Kostynchak – Kalashan pen, Suchkov (M) og, A.Arutyunyan] 
SPARTAK Ashkhabad            2-1  Krasny Metallurg Liepaja 
  [Borkin 40, Bagirov 70 – G.Zviedris 81] 
TORPEDO Stalingrad           w/o  Dinamo Frunze

==== Second round replays ====
[Sep 8] 
SPARTAK Tashkent             4-2  Dinamo Kutaisi 
  [V.Undakov-2, V.Vitkalov, L.Maksudov – G.Mepisashvili, G.Kobzianidze] 
[Sep 11] 
Dinamo Kishinev              0-1  DINAMO Alma-Ata 
  [Sudomoyev] 
[Sep 13] 
NEFTYANIK Baku               4-1  Khimik Moskva 
  [Timakov-2, Yuriy Kuznetsov, Mikuchadze – Biryulin]

=== Third round ===
SHAKHTYOR Stalino            w/o  Avangard Chelyabinsk 
[Sep 6] 
METALLURG Dnepropetrovsk     1-0  Torpedo Rostov-na-Donu 
  [Shikov] 
[Sep 10] 
Iskra Frunze                 0-2  DAUGAVA Riga 
  [Viktor Zhilin 30, 35] 
[Sep 15] 
Burevestnik Kishinev         0-1  DINAMO Alma-Ata 
  [Vasin] 
[Sep 16] 
SPARTAK Ashkhabad            1-0  Spartak Tashkent 
  [Borkin] 
[Sep 18] 
DINAMO-2 Moskva              1-0  Dinamo Petrozavodsk 
GORNYAK Leninabad            8-4  Neftyanik Baku 
  [Zaynutdinov-2, Korobov-2, Klimanov-2, Suetin, Yushnov – Yuriy Kuznetsov-2, Suleymanov, Timakov] 
METALLURG Zaporozhye         4-1  Torpedo Stalingrad   
  [P.Ponomaryov-2, O.Kiknadze, I.Kostynchak – Dubovitskiy]

=== Fourth round ===
[Aug 30] 
SHAKHTYOR Stalino            1-0  Dinamo-2 Moskva 
  [Leonid Savinov 46] 
[Sep 17] 
DAUGAVA Riga                 5-1  Metallurg Dnepropetrovsk 
  [Zhilin-2, Jegers-2, Balykin – Klochko] 
[Sep 23] 
DINAMO Alma-Ata              6-2  Gornyak Leninabad        [in Moskva] 
  [Mezhov-2, Bolotov-2, Vasin-2 – Klimanov, Yushnov] 
METALLURG Zaporozhye         6-2  Spartak Ashkhabad        [in Moskva] 
  [I.Kostynchak-2, P.Ponomaryov-2, B.Zozulya, O.Kiknadze – Maduntsev, Yepikhin]

=== Fifth round ===
[Sep 18] 
TORPEDO Moskva               3-1  Zenit Leningrad 
  [Vyacheslav Solovyov 7, Vitaliy Vatskevich ?, Boris Safronov ? – N.Gartvig 84] 
[Sep 21] 
Dinamo Moskva                2-2  Dinamo Leningrad 
  [Vladimir Shabrov 42, Sergei Korshunov 86 – Georgiy Grammatikopulo 2, Alexei Kolobov 3] 
[Sep 22] 
LOKOMOTIV Moskva             1-0  Lokomotiv Kharkov 
  [Yevgeniy Bologov] 
[Sep 24] 
Daugava Riga                 0-0  Spartak Vilnius 
[Sep 27] 
DINAMO Tbilisi               4-0  Dinamo Kiev              [in Moskva] 
  [Avtandil Gogoberidze 37, Zaur Kaloyev 57, Georgiy Antadze 73, Avtandil Chkuaseli 86] 
SPARTAK Moskva               5-0  Metallurg Zaporozhye 
  [Nikolai Dementyev-3, Nikita Simonyan, Anatoliy Ilyin] 
[Sep 28] 
Shakhtyor Stalino            0-0  Dinamo Alma-Ata

==== Fifth round replays ====
[Sep 22] 
DINAMO Moskva                3-0  Dinamo Leningrad 
  [Vladimir Shabrov 23, Konstantin Beskov 57, 68] 
[Sep 25] 
DAUGAVA Riga                 1-0  Spartak Vilnius 
  [Viktor Zhilin 13] 
[Sep 29] 
SHAKHTYOR Stalino            2-0  Dinamo Alma-Ata 
  [Valentin Sapronov, Leonid Savinov]

=== Quarterfinals ===
[Sep 23] 
Torpedo Moskva               0-1  ZENIT Kuibyshev 
  [Fyodor Novikov 39] 
[Oct 1] 
DINAMO Moskva                1-0  Dinamo Tbilisi 
  [Konstantin Beskov 85] 
[Oct 2] 
SHAKHTYOR Stalino            2-1  Daugava Riga             [in Moskva] 
  [Valentin Sapronov, Koloskov – Janis Uzulis] 
[Oct 3] 
LOKOMOTIV Moskva             1-0  Spartak Moskva                [aet] 
  [Anatoliy Bashashkin (S) 103 og]

=== Semifinals ===
[Oct 5] 
DINAMO Moskva                1-0  Shakhtyor Stalino 
  [Vladimir Shabrov 80] 
[Oct 6] 
Lokomotiv Moskva             0-2  ZENIT Kuibyshev 
  [Alexandr Gulevskiy 21, Grigoriy Gornostayev 72]

=== Final ===
10 October 1953

Dinamo Moscow	1 – 0	Zenit Kuibyshev
Salnikov 7'	[ Report]

Moscow
