= 1944 Estonian Football Championship =

1944 Estonian Championship
- Dates: 21 May –12 July 1944 (first round); 20 July –15 August 1944 (second round)

The Estonian Top Division 1944 was the 23rd football league season in Estonia. First round was scheduled from 21 May to 12 July. Second round from 20 July to 15 August. The season was discontinued after 7 rounds due to the Red Army offensive. The front had reached Estonia on January and the battles on Estonian territory lasted until December. The system and majority of the clubs existing before were discontinued.

== Entrants ==
- JK Tervis Pärnu
- Tartu Politsei Spordiring
- JS Estonia Tallinn
- ESS Kalev Tallinn
- VS Sport Tallinn
- Tallinna Spordiklubi
