= 1942 Estonian Football Championship =

1942 Estonian Championship
Final positions
- Champions: Tartu Prefektuuri Spordiring (1st title)

The Estonian Top Division 1942 was the 1st football league season in Estonia under the Nazi German occupation.

First round started on 19 July and ended on 6 September. Second round started on 22 September and ended on 11 October. Tartu Prefektuuri Spordiring won the title.

== League table ==
Pos	Team	Pld	W	D	L	GF	GA	GD	Pts
1	Tartu Prefektuuri Spordiring (C)	7	4	1	2	15	11	+4	9
2	JS Estonia Tallinn	7	4	0	3	17	11	+6	8
3	Pärnu Tervis	7	3	1	3	21	17	+4	7
4	Narva Spordiklubi	4	2	0	2	9	8	+1	4
5	Tallinna Spordiklubi	7	2	0	5	10	25	−15	4

(C) Champions

== Results ==
Home \ Away	EST	NAR	TSK	TAR	TER
Estonia		2–1	5–0	1–2	3–1
Narva SK	–		5–1	2–0	–
Tallinna SK	0–3	–		2–1	4–2
Tartu PS	3–1	–	4–1		3–3
Tervis	4–2	5–1	5–2	1–2	

Legend: Blue = home team win; Yellow = draw; Red = away team win.
