= 1952 Estonian SSR Football Championship =

Estonian SSR Higher League
- Season: 1952
- Champions: Baltic Fleet Tallinn; 4th title

The 1952 Estonian SSR Football Championship was won by Baltic Fleet Tallinn.

== Group A ==
Pos	Team	Pld	W	D	L	GF	GA	GD	Pts	Qualification
1	Baltic Fleet Tallinn	5	5	0	0	27	0	+27	10	Qualification for Championship play-off
2	Soviet Air Forces Club Sokol	5	3	1	1	14	2	+12	7	Qualification for Championship play-off
3	Kohtla-Järve Kalev	5	2	1	2	11	15	−4	5	Qualification for Championship play-off
4	Viljandi Spartak	5	2	0	3	2	14	−12	4	Qualification for Bottom play-off
5	Rakvere Dünamo	5	1	1	3	3	16	−13	3	Qualification for Bottom play-off
6	Pärnu Kalev	5	0	1	4	3	13	−10	1	Qualification for Bottom play-off

== Group B ==
Pos	Team	Pld	W	D	L	GF	GA	GD	Pts	Qualification
1	Tallinna Dünamo	5	5	0	0	28	4	+24	10	Qualification for Championship play-off
2	Narva Kalev	5	3	1	1	11	14	−3	7	Qualification for Championship play-off
3	Tartu ÜSK	5	3	0	2	5	10	−5	6	Qualification for Championship play-off
4	Tallinna Kalev II	5	2	1	2	1	4	−3	5	Qualification for Bottom play-off
5	Tartu Dünamo	5	1	0	4	3	8	−5	2	Qualification for Bottom play-off
6	Kiviõli Kalev	5	0	0	5	2	10	−8	0	Qualification for Bottom play-off

== Championship play-off ==
Pos	Team	Pld	W	D	L	GF	GA	GD	Pts
1	Baltic Fleet Tallinn (C)	10	10	0	0	50	3	+47	20
2	Soviet Air Forces Club Sokol	10	6	1	3	20	13	+7	13
3	Kohtla-Järve Kalev	10	4	2	4	10	18	−8	10
4	Narva Kalev	10	4	1	5	17	21	−4	9
5	Tallinna Dünamo	10	4	0	6	22	12	+10	8
6	Tartu ÜSK	10	0	0	10	1	53	−52	0

(C) Champions

== Bottom play-off ==
Pos	Team	Pld	W	D	L	GF	GA	GD	Pts
7	Tallinna Kalev II	10	6	1	3	30	9	+21	13
8	Pärnu Kalev	10	5	0	5	19	17	+2	10
9	Viljandi Spartak	10	4	2	4	22	21	+1	10
10	Kiviõli Kalev	10	4	2	4	18	19	−1	10
11	Rakvere Dünamo	10	2	5	3	11	22	−11	9
12	Tartu Dünamo	10	3	2	5	11	23	−12	8
