= FC Norma Tallinn =

Estonian football club

Norma Tallinn
- Full name: FC Norma Tallinn
- Founded: 1959
- Dissolved: 1997
- Ground: Norma Staadion (now Maarjamäe staadion), Tallinn
- Capacity: 1,000
Home colours	Away colours

Norma Tallinn was an Estonian football club. Norma Tallinn became the first Estonian champions after the Soviet Union collapse, they went on to defend their title next year, in 1993. Norma also won the Estonian Cup in 1994. The club was relegated to the second division in 1995 and to the third the following year. Norma Tallinn were dissolved after the 1996–97 season.

== History ==
Founded in 1959, Norma Tallinn was one of the biggest football clubs in Estonian SSR. The club participated in 32 Estonian SSR championships (more than any other team), winning the title on five occasions, as well as winning six Estonian SSR Cup titles.

After Estonia regained its independence in 1991, Norma joined the newly formed Estonian Meistriliiga. Alongside their rivals Lantana Tallinn (Nikol Tallinn back then), the club became very popular among the ethnic Russian minority in Estonia. Norma won the first two Meistriliiga titles.

In 1994, Norma finished level on points with Flora Tallinn and according to the rules, had to play in a championship playoff, but, as a protest against the disqualification of Tevalte Tallinn because of match fixing allegations, Norma decided to field their youth squad. Flora won the playoff 5–2.

The following season Norma Tallinn were relegated to the Esiliiga.

== Achievements ==
- Meistriliiga: (2)

1992, 1992–93

- Estonian Cup: (1)

1993–94

- Estonian SSR Championship: (5)

1964, 1967, 1970, 1979, 1988

- Estonian SSR Cup: (6)

1962, 1965, 1971, 1973, 1974, 1989

== Norma Tallinn in Estonian Football ==
Year	League	Position	Goals +/-	Points
1992	I	1	+18	12
92/93	I	1	+86	42
93/94	I	2	+58	36
94/95	I	6	-42	10
95/96	II	3	+2	17
96/97	II	8	-22	7
97/98	III	dnp*	dnp	dnp

*Did not participate

== Norma Tallinn in Europe ==
- 1Q = 1st Qualifying Round

Season	Cup	Round	Country	Club	Home	Away	Agg.
1992–93	Champions League	1Q	(Slovenia)	Olimpija Ljubljana	0–2	0–3	0–5
1993–94	Champions League	1Q	(Finland)	HJK Helsinki	0–1	1–1	1–2
1994–95	Cup Winners' Cup	1Q	(Slovenia)	Maribor	1–4	0–10	1–14

== Managers ==
- (Soviet Union) Uno Piir (1959)
- (Soviet Union) Uno Piir (1962–89)
- (Estonia) Valeri Bondarenko (1991–93)
- (Estonia) Mait Kebina (1994)
- (Russia) Eduard Belkin (1994)
- (Estonia) Juri Tšurilkin (1994–95)
