= 2021–22 Estonian Cup =

Estonian football competition

Tournament details
- Country: Estonia
- Teams: 89

Final positions
- Champions: Paide Linnameeskond (1st title)
- Runners-up: Nõmme Kalju

Tournament statistics
- Matches played: 88
- Goals scored: 509 (5.78 per match)

The 2021–22 Estonian Cup was the 32nd season of the Estonian main domestic football knockout tournament. Paide Linnameeskond won their first title and qualified for the 2022–23 UEFA Europa Conference League.

== First round (1/64) ==
The draw was made by Estonian Football Association on 20 May 2021.

- League level of the club in the brackets.
- Rahvaliiga RL (people's league) is a league organized by Estonian Football Association, but not part of the main league system.

22 June 2021	Raplamaa JK (4)	15−0	Wolfram FC (RL)	Rapla
19:00		Report		Attendance: 37; Referee: Martin Uusküla

22 June 2021	Viimsi Lõvid (6)	0−3	FC Flora U19 (4)	Viimsi
		Report		Attendance: 40; Referee: John Demir

26 June 2021	FC Mulgi (RL)	3−1	Jalgpalliklubi 32. Keskkool (RL)	Karksi-Nuia
20:00

29 June 2021	JK Loo (5)	4–2	IdaVirumaa FC Alliance U21 (4)	Loo
		Report

30 June 2021	JK Kernu Kadakas (5)	3–3 (a.e.t.) (3–4 p)	Tallinna FC TransferWise (6)	Kernu
		Report

1 July 2021	Tallinna FC Olympic Olybet (6)	2–1	FC Hiiumaa (4)	Tallinn
		Report

5 July 2021	Tallinna FC Zenit (5)	4–2	JK Tallinna Kalev U21 (3)	Tallinn
		Report

8 July 2021	FC Kohvile (RL)	7–4	Young FC (RL)	Tartu
		Report

9 July 2021	Viimsi JK (3)	3–1 (a.e.t.)	Pärnu JK Vaprus (1)	Viimsi
		Report

10 July 2021	FC Vastseliina (5)	4–0	Tallinna FC Teleios (6)	Vastseliina
		Report

10 July 2021	Viljandi JK Tulevik U21 (4)	w/o	Tallinna JK Piraaja (4)	Viljandi
		Report

10 July 2021	Valga FC Warrior (5)	w/o	FCT Titans (RL)	Valga
		Report

10 July 2021	Ida-Virumaa FC Alliance (3)	10–1	Tartu JK Welco X (5)	Kohtla-Järve
		Report

10 July 2021	JK Narva Trans (1)	w/o	IBK Here for Beer (RL)	Narva
		Report

10 July 2021	Tallinna FC Eston Villa II (6)	w/o	Tallinna FC Ararat (5)	Tallinn
		Report

10 July 2021	FC Nõmme United (2)	w/o	Jõgeva SK Noorus-96 (4)	Tallinn
		Report

10 July 2021	Rakvere JK Tarvas (4)	3–1	FC Puhkus Mehhikos (RL)	Rakvere
		Report

11 July 2021	Tallinna JK Legion U21 (3)	5–2	Annelinna Ajax (RL)	Tallinn
		Report

11 July 2021	Rumori Calcio II Tallinn (6)	1–4	FCP Pärnu (RL)	Tallinn
		Report

11 July 2021	Märjamaa Kompanii (5)	4–5	SK Imavere (5)	Märjamaa
		Report

11 July 2021	FC Elva (2)	3–0 (a.e.t.)	Tartu Team Helm (5)	Elva
		Report

11 July 2021	FC Tallinna Wolves (6)	1–5	Tallinna JK Jalgpallihaigla (6)	Tallinn
		Report

13 July 2021	Läänemaa JK Haapsalu (5)	11–1	FC Äksi Wolves (6)	Haapsalu
		Report

14 July 2021	FC Kose (4)	0–2	Tallinna FC Maksatransport (5)	Kose
		jalgpall.ee/voistlused/protocol/98940

14 July 2021	Kristiine JK (6)	5–3	FC Jõgeva Wolves (5)	Tallinn
		Report

18 July 2021	FC Järva-Jaani (5)	w/o	FC Kusti (RL)	Järva-Jaani
		Report

20 July 2021	Viljandi JK Tulevik (1)	26–0	FC Lelle (6)	Viljandi
		Report

21 July 2021	FCI Tallinn (4)	8–0	Tallinna FC Hell Hunt (5)	Tallinn
		Report

=== Byes ===
These teams were not drawn and secured a place in the second round without playing:

- Meistriliiga (Level 1): FC Kuressaare, Tallinna JK Legion, Nõmme Kalju FC, Tartu JK Tammeka
- Esiliiga (2): Tartu JK Welco, JK Tallinna Kalev, Tallinna FC Flora U21, Pärnu Jalgpalliklubi
- Esiliiga B (3): Läänemaa JK, JK Tabasalu, FC Tallinn,
- II Liiga (4): Paide Linnameeskond III, FA Tartu Kalev, Põhja-Tallinna JK Volta, Tartu FC Helios,
- III Liiga (5): Saku Sporting, FC Maardu Aliens, Pärnu JK Poseidon, Tallinna FC Zapoos, JK Tabasalu II, Tallinna SC ReUnited, Tallinna FC Eston Villa, Türi Ganvix JK, Jõhvi FC Phoenix
- IV Liiga (6): Tallinna FC Soccernet, Maarjamäe FC Vigri, Rumori Calcio Tallinn
- Rahvaliiga (RL): JK Pärnu Sadam, FC EstHam United, JK Karskem Karsklus

== Second round (1/32) ==
The draw for the second round was made on 20 May 2021.

10 July 2021	FC EstHam United (RL)	0–6	Tallinna FC Ararat (5)	Tallinn
		Report

22 July 2021	JK Loo (5)	2–3	FC Tallinn (3)	Loo
		Report

22 July 2021	FC Kohvile (RL)	1–2	Tartu JK Welco (2)	Tartu
		Report

23 July 2021	Viljandi JK Tulevik U21 (4)	4–0	Türi Ganvix JK (5)	Viljandi
		Report

23 July 2021	Tartu FC Helios (4)	3–1	Rakvere JK Tarvas (4)	Tartu
		Report

23 July 2021	Tallinna FC TransferWise (6)	2–9	JK Tallinna Kalev (2)	Tallinn
		Report

24 July 2021	Valga FC Warrior (5)	1–4	Kristiine JK (6)	Valga
		Report

24 July 2021	FA Tartu Kalev (4)	10–0	Läänemaa JK Haapsalu (5)	Tartu
		Report

24 July 2021	Saku Sporting (6)	0–9	Tartu JK Tammeka (1)	Saku
		Report

24 July 2021	FC Nõmme United (2)	w/o	SK Imavere (5)	Tallinn
		Report

24 July 2021	Tallinna JK Legion (1)	21–0	Tallinna FC Soccernet (6)	Tallinn
		Report

24 July 2021	Viimsi JK (3)	w/o	Tallinna SC ReUnited (5)	Viimsi
		Report

24 July 2021	JK Narva Trans (1)	5–0	Ida-Virumaa FC Alliance (4)	Narva
		Report

24 July 2021	Pärnu JK Poseidon (5)	0–9	FC Kuressaare (1)	Pärnu
		Report

24 July 2021	Tallinna FC Flora U21 (2)	24–0	JK Karskem Karsklus (RL)	Tallinn
		Report

25 July 2021	Rumori Calcio Tallinn (6)	0–7	Läänemaa JK (3)	Tallinn
		Report

25 July 2021	Nõmme Kalju FC (1)	32–0	FC Mulgi (RL)	Tallinn
		Report

25 July 2021	Tallinna FC Zapoos (5)	2–0	Jõhvi FC Phoenix (5)	Tallinn
		Report

25 July 2021	JK Tabasalu (3)	11–1	Maarjamäe FC Vigri (6)	Tabasalu
		Report

25 July 2021	FC Maardu Aliens (5)	2–3	Tallinna FC Eston Villa (5)	Maardu
		Report

25 July 2021	Tallinna FC Maksatransport (5)	1–3	Raplamaa JK (4)	Tallinn
		Report

25 July 2021	Tallinna FC Zenit (5)	1–4	Paide Linnameeskond III (4)	Tallinn
		Report

25 July 2021	FC Elva (2)	13–1	Tallinna JK Jalgpallihaigla (6)	Elva
		Report

28 July 2021	Viljandi JK Tulevik (1)	w/o	Tallinna FC Olympic Olybet (6)	Viljandi
		Report

28 July 2021	FC Flora U19 (4)	12–0	FCP Pärnu (RL)	Tallinn
		Report

28 July 2021	FCI Tallinn (4)	8–1	JK Pärnu Sadam (RL)	Tallinn
		Report

29 July 2021	FC Vastseliina (5)	w/o	Põhja-Tallinna JK Volta (4)	Vastseliina
		Report

9 August 2021	Pärnu Jalgpalliklubi (2)	2–0	Tallinna JK Legion U21 (3)	Pärnu
		Report

11 August 2021	JK Tabasalu II (5)	6–0	FC Järva-Jaani (5)	Tabasalu
		Report

== Third round (1/16) ==
The draw for the third round was made on 27 July 2021.

4 August 2021	Viljandi JK Tulevik (1)	10–0	Viljandi JK Tulevik U21 (4)	Viljandi
		Report

4 August 2021	Paide Linnameeskond III (4)	5–0	Kristiine JK (6)	Paide
		Report

9 August 2021	JK Narva Trans (1)	w/o	Tallinna FC Eston Villa (5)	Narva
		Report

16 August 2021	FC Elva (2)	2–0	Viimsi JK (3)	Elva
		Report

17 August 2021	Läänemaa JK (3)	2–8	Tallinna JK Legion (1)	Haapsalu
		Report

18 August 2021	Tartu JK Tammeka (1)	3–1	FC Kuressaare (1)	Tartu
		Report

18 August 2021	Nõmme Kalju FC (1)	9–1	Tallinna FC Zapoos (5)	Tallinn
		Report

23 August 2021	Raplamaa JK (4)	0–5	FCI Levadia (1)	Rapla
		Report

25 August 2021	Tallinna FC Ararat (5)	2–3	FC Vastseliina (5)	Tallinn
		Report

1 September 2021	Tartu FC Helios (4)	0–3	Tartu JK Welco (2)	Tartu
		Report

2 September 2021	JK Tallinna Kalev (2)	3–0	JK Tabasalu II (5)	Tallinn
		Report

21 September 2021	FA Tartu Kalev (4)	4–2	FC Nõmme United (2)	Tartu
		Report

21 September 2021	FCI Tallinn (4)	2–3	FC Flora U21 (2)	Tallinn
		Report

22 September 2021	FC Tallinn (3)	1–4	Paide Linnameeskond (1)	Tallinn
		Report

6 October 2021	Pärnu Jalgpalliklubi (2)	0–1	JK Tabasalu (3)	Pärnu
		Report

12 December 2021	FC Flora U19 (4)	0–14	FC Flora (1)	Tallinn
		Report

== Fourth round (1/8) ==
The draw for the third round was made on 24 August 2021.

23 October 2021	Paide Linnameeskond (1)	14–0	Flora U21 (2)	Paide
		Report

23 October 2021	Tallinna JK Legion (1)	w/o	FC Elva (2)	Tallinn
		Report

23 October 2021	Viljandi JK Tulevik (1)	1–3	Nõmme Kalju FC (1)	Viljandi
		Report

23 October 2021	JK Narva Trans (1)	3–0	Tartu JK Welco (2)	Narva
		Report

24 October 2021	Tartu JK Tammeka (1)	3–0	FA Tartu Kalev (4)	Tartu
		Report

14 November 2021	FCI Levadia (1)	3–0	JK Tallinna Kalev (2)	Tallinn
		Report

16 December 2021	FC Flora (1)	w/o	Paide Linnameeskond III (4)	Tallinn
		Report

5 February 2022	FC Vastseliina (5)	w/o	JK Tabasalu (3)	Vastseliina
		Report

== Quarter-finals ==
8 March 2022	JK Narva Trans (1)	2–0	Tartu JK Tammeka (1)	Tallinn
		Report		Stadium: Sportland Arena

9 March 2022	Tallinna JK Legion (1)	0–2	Paide Linnameeskond (1)	Tallinn
		Report		Stadium: Sportland Arena

9 March 2022	FC Flora (1)	2–0	FCI Levadia (1)	Tallinn
		Report		Stadium: Sportland Arena

10 March 2022	Nõmme Kalju FC (1)	7–0	JK Tabasalu (3)	Tallinn
		Report		Stadium: Sportland Arena

== Semi-finals ==
15 May 2022	JK Narva Trans (1)	0–1	Nõmme Kalju (1)	Narva
		Report		Stadium: Narva Kalev-Fama Stadium

5 May 2022	FC Flora (1)	0–0 (4–5 p)	Paide Linnameeskond (1)	Tallinn
		Report		Stadium: A. Le Coq Arena

== Final ==
21 May 2022	Nõmme Kalju	0–1 (a.e.t.)	Paide Linnameeskond	Tallinn
19:00 EEST		Report	Siim Luts 109'	Stadium: A. Le Coq Arena; Attendance: 1,358; Referee: Martti Pukk
