= 2020–21 Estonian Cup =

31st season of the Estonian main domestic football

Tournament details
- Country: Estonia
- Teams: 87

Final positions
- Champions: Levadia (10th title)
- Runners-up: Flora

Tournament statistics
- Matches played: 86
- Goals scored: 462 (5.37 per match)

The 2020–21 Estonian Cup was the 31st season of the Estonian main domestic football knockout tournament. FCI Levadia won their tenth title, and qualified for the 2021–22 UEFA Europa Conference League.

== First Round (1/64) ==
First round matches were played between 22 July and 12 August.

22 July 2020	Kuressaare (1)	18–0	Anija (5)	Kuressaare
19:00	Tuhkanen 4'; Männilaan 9', 42', 66', 82'; Miil 15'; Saar 18', 21', 40'; Kelder 47', 49', 73', 88'; Krimm 51'; Rass 72'; Valmas 81' (pen.), 84'; Soomre 81'	Report		Stadium: Kuressaare linnastaadion Attendance: 96; Referee: Argo Pruul

26 July 2020	FC Tallinn (4)	1–1 (6–5 p)	FC Elva (2)	Lasnamäe
16:00	Taar 11' (pen.)	Report	Kolesnitšenko 6'	Stadium: Lasnamäe Spordikompleksi kunstmurustaadion Attendance: 80; Referee: Revo Sirel

27 July 2020	Tallinna FC Eston Villa (5)	2–0	Rasmus Värki Jalgpallikool (RL)	Tallinn
20:30	Vassiljev 56'; Velt 59' (o.g.)	Report		Stadium: Sõle kunstmuruväljak Attendance: 45; Referee: Denis Petrov

28 July 2020	FCI Tallinn (4)	5–1	Tartu FC Helios (4)	Lasnamäe
19:00		Report		Stadium: Infonet Lasnamäe Stadium; Attendance: 58; Referee: Aleksei Latõnin

28 July 2020	Maardu Linnameeskond (2)	9–0	FC Sssolutions (RL)	Maardu
19:00	Tsõmbaljuk 13'; Dovženok 29', 76'; Lebedev 33', 61'; Mihhailov 45'; Kassjantšuk 71'; Boldyrev 87'; Polkopa 90'	Report		Stadium: Maardu Stadium; Attendance: 100; Referee: Robert Lauri

28 July 2020	Tallinna FC Flora U21 (2)	10–1	Tallinna FC Zapoos (5)	Tallinn
19:00	Ustritski 8', 28', 45', 47'; Jermatšenko 33'; Kuraksin 38', 73'; Fedotov 48', 59'; Tohver 57'	Report	Karlson 71'	Stadium: Flora Lilleküla Stadium; Attendance: 78; Referee: Timo Sujev

28 July 2020	Viimsi JK (3)	4–2	Kristiine JK (6)	Haabneeme
19:00	Riigov 34'; Sõerde 39', 45', 73'	Report	Ernits 40'; Tomson 82'	Stadium: Viimsi KK Stadium; Attendance: 86; Referee: William Vaask

28 July 2020	Põhja-Sakala (4)	5–1	FC Äksi Wolves (5)	Suure-Jaani
19:00	Mart. Terras 4'; Marg. Terras 25', 43' (pen.); Rosin 49' (o.g.); Domberg 51'	Report	Lekunze 45'	Stadium: Suure-Jaani gümnaasiumi staadion Attendance: 42; Referee: Voiteh Karnatsevitš

28 July 2020	Paide Linnameeskond IV (5)	1–2	Kohtla-Järve JK Järve (2)	Paide
19:00	Seire 4' (pen.)	Report	Tihhonov 43'; Salmus 65'	Stadium: Paide linnastaadion Attendance: 82; Referee: Richard Toom

28 July 2020	JK Narva Trans (1)	4–0	Paide Linnameeskond III (4)	Narva
19:00	Geoffrey 6', 42', 57'; Zakarliuka 85' (pen.)	Report		Stadium: Narva Kreenholm Stadium; Attendance: 340; Referee: Jagnar Jakobson

29 July 2020	Tallinna JK Legion (1)	9–0	IBK Here For Beer (RL)	Tallinn
19:00	Vnukov 18'; Lipin 45', 54' (pen.), 87'; Prosa 66', 68', 75'; Tšendei 81'; Kovtunovitš 90'	Report		Stadium: Kadriorg Stadium; Attendance: 107; Referee: Johann Kuldmäe

29 July 2020	Paide Linnameeskond (1)	24–0	AFC Eyjafjallajökull (RL)	Paide
19:00	Kauber 7', 18', 55', 88'; Valge 13', 21', 25'; Kokla 23'; Kärp 27', 79', 82'; Barruetabena 29', 72'; Palumets 40', 44' (pen.), 70', 75'; Aer 50'; Luts 58'; Lubega 62', 69', 86'; Frolov 87', 90'	Report		Stadium: Paide linnastaadion Attendance: 90; Referee: Raiki Mänd

29 July 2020	Tallinna FC Olympic Olybet (6)	1–2	Pärnu JK Poseidon (4)	Tallinn
19:00		Report		Stadium: Nike Arena; Attendance: 17; Referee: Andrei Brõtkin

29 July 2020	Raplamaa JK (4)	w/o	Tallinna FC Eston Villa II (6)	Rapla
19:00		Report		Stadium: Rapla Kesklinna Kooli staadion Referee: Vladimir Zahharov

29 July 2020	FCI Levadia Tallinn (1)	6–0	Kohtla-Nõmme SK (RL)	Tallinn
19:30	Saar 28' (o.g.); Morozov 30'; Komlov 35', 55' (pen.), 62' (pen.); Õigus 42'	Report		Stadium: Maarjamäe staadion Attendance: 46; Referee: Revo Sirel

29 July 2020	Põhja-Tallinna JK Volta (4)	4–2	FC Jõgeva Wolves (4)	Tallinn
20:35	Umokoro 24', 27'; Veeber 38'; Nurmsaar 90'	Report	Murumaa 5', 83' (pen.)	Stadium: Sõle kunstmuruväljak Attendance: 36; Referee: Rasmus Maalinn

29 July 2020	Tallinna FC Pocarr (5)	3–0	Maarjamäe FC IGI (6)	Lasnamäe
20:45		Report		Stadium: Infonet Lasnamäe Stadium; Attendance: 20; Referee: Urmo Visnapuu

29 July 2020	FC Kohvile (RL)	9–0	Jalgpalliklubi 32. Keskkool (RL)	Tartu
21:00	Randlahe 15', 30', 71'; Põldmaa 31'; Ploompuu 32'; Okružko 42', 62'; Lepp 56'; Tann 76'	Report		Stadium: Tartu Sepa jalgpallikeskuse kunstmuruväljak Attendance: 225; Referee: Marko Liiva

31 July 2020	JK Loo (5)	9–1	JK Metsis (RL)	Loo
20:00	Säde 19', 83'; Mägi 20'; Saadi 26', 28', 31'; Ndongo Ebi 45'; Orav 60', 85'	Report	Nummert 65'	Stadium: Loo kunstmuruväljak Attendance: 18; Referee: Dmitri Kossatšov

1 August 2020	JK Pärnu Sadam (RL)	8–1	FC Pukkus Mehhikos (RL)	Tartu
17:00	Alve 20', 57', 60', 65'; Kallandi 24', 51'; Kaio 76'; Tiimann 83'	Report	Maasik 69'	Stadium: Tartu Tamme staadion Attendance: 28; Referee: Kristjan Kattus

2 August 2020	Märjamaa Kompanii (5)	4–1	Tallinna FC Teleios (6)	Märjamaa
17:00	Gabrite 6'; Gold 53'; Vahur 74'; Sassian 83'	Report	Milli 21'	Stadium: Märjamaa Gümnaasiumi staadion Attendance: 61; Referee: Ivo Kiviselg

2 August 2020	Saku Sporting (5)	6–0	JK Kernu Kadakas (5)	Saku
19:00	Krik 14'; Toomet 47', 83'; Maling 51'; Kaalma 62'; Kraam 78' (o.g.)	Report		Stadium: Saku staadion Attendance: 108; Referee: Martin Uusküla

12 August 2020	JK Tallinna Kalev (1)	6–3	FC Nõmme United (2)	Tallinn
19:00		Report		Stadium: Kadriorg Stadium; Attendance: 385; Referee: Karl Koppel

== Second round (1/32) ==
Second round matches were played between 28 July and 11 August.

28 July 2020	Team Helm (RL)	2–1	JK Tallinna Kalev U21 (3)	Tartu
14:00	Vään 12'; Püvi 38'	Report	Sjöblom 33'	Stadium: Tamme kunstmuruväljak Attendance: 73; Referee: Karl Kena

28 July 2020	FC Zenit Tallinn (5)	0–13	Tartu JK Tammeka (1)	Kernu
19:00		Report	Tekko 9', 25' (pen.); Paju 20', 54', 85'; Slashchev 44'; Preiman 49', 64'; Veelma 50', 65'; Tammik 55'; Reinkort 60'; Maanas 67'	Stadium: Põhikooli staadion Attendance: 30; Referee: Kevin Kaivoja

28 July 2020	Nõmme Kalju FC (1)	8–0	Rummu Dünamo (5)	Hiiu
19:00	Natkho 26' (pen.); Tamm 37', 40' (pen.), 72'; Kulinitš 50'; Volkov 77'; Paur 78'; Jeršov 87'	Report		Stadium: Hiiu Stadium; Attendance: 173; Referee: Tanel Üprus

29 July 2020	SK Imavere (5)	5–1	Valga FC Warrior (5)	Imavere
19:00				Stadium: Imavere Stadium; Referee: Viljar Pennert

29 July 2020	Jõgeva SK Noorus-96 (4)	1–2 (a.e.t.)	Tallinna FC Hell Hunt (5)	Jõgeva
19:00	Liblik 25'	Report	Arumeel 90'	Stadium: Vaimastvere Arena; Attendance: 27; Referee: Siim Suurmets

29 July 2020	Rumori Calcio II Tallinn (5)	3–0	Põlva FC Lootos (5)	Tallinn
20:30	Boscarolo 44', 61'; Karmann 86'	Report		Stadium: Kalevi Keskstaadioni kunstmuruväljak Attendance: 22; Referee: Kert Küttis

2 August 2020	Viimsi Lõvid (6)	0–4	Pärnu JK Vaprus (2)	Viimsi
19:00		Report	Tiismaa 14', 28', 88'; Pent 59'	Stadium: Viimsi staadion Attendance: 105; Referee: Oliver Väät

3 August 2020	Pärnu Jalgpalliklubi (2)	1–4	Tallinna FC Flora (1)	Pärnu
19:00	Kauniste 10'	Report	Poom 34', 61'; Pürg 35'; Kiivit 45'	Stadium: Pärnu Rannastaadion; Attendance: 448; Referee: Reelika Turi

5 August 2020	Paide Linnameeskond (1)	9–0	Viljandi JK Tulevik U21 (4)	Paide
17:30	Lubega 20', 38'; Kase 27'; Luts 36'; Einer 45'; Mööl 55'; Saliste 57'; Kauber 73', 84'	Report		Stadium: Paide linnastaadion Attendance: 148; Referee: Paul Kask

6 August 2020	Märjamaa Kompanii (5)	4–1	Tallinna FC Soccernet (6)	Märjamaa
19:00	Kungla 5'; Mõtt 44'; Sassian 60'; Elfenbein 90+2' (pen.)	Report	Volk 89'	Stadium: Märjamaa Gümnaasiumi staadion Attendance: 88; Referee: Rein Väin

6 August 2020	Lilleküla JK Retro (5)	5–0	JK Loo (5)	Lilleküla
19:00	Jevdokimov 9'; Laasberg 39'; Ahjupera 48'; Sillaste 69'; Vassiljev 86'	Report		Stadium: EJL TNTK jalgpalliväljak Attendance: 23; Referee: Andres Kuuse

== Third round (1/16) ==
Third round matches were played between 10 September and 14 October.

10 September 2020	Raplamaa (4)	1–1 (2–4 p)	Tallinna FC Hell Hunt (5)	Rapla
19:30		Report		Stadium: Rapla Jalgpallihall; Attendance: 69; Referee: Denis Petrov

16 September 2020	FC Kose (4)	0–8	Tulevik (1)	Oru
17:45		Report		Stadium: Oru Põhikooli staadion Attendance: 65; Referee: Johann Kuldmäe

23 September 2020	FCI Levadia (1)	5–0	Lilleküla JK Retro (5)	Tallinn
19:30		Report		Stadium: Venue Maarjamäe Staadion; Attendance: 72; Referee: Kevin Kaivoja

29 September 2020	Märjamaa Kompanii (5)	2–1	Rumori Calcio II Tallinn (6)	Kaerepere
19:00		Report		Stadium: Valtu kunstmuruväljak Attendance: 42; Referee: Kevin Kaivoja

29 September 2020	Maardu Linnameeskond (2)	5–3	Keila JK (3)	Maardu
19:00		Report		Stadium: Maardu kunstmuruväljak Attendance: 118; Referee: Eiko Saar

29 September 2020	Tartu JK Welco (2)	1–6	FC Kuressaare (1)	Tartu
19:00		Report		Stadium: Tartu Annelinna kunstmurustaadion Attendance: 125; Referee: Siim Rinken

29 September 2020	SK Imavere (5)	0–3	JK Tallinna Kalev (1)	Paide
19:00		Report		Stadium: Paide kunstmuruväljak Attendance: 27; Referee: Raiki Mänd

30 September 2020	Team Helm (RL)	1–2	JK Narva Trans (1)	Tartu
16:30		Report		Stadium: Tartu Tamme kunstmuruväljak Attendance: 232; Referee: Marko Liiva

30 September 2020	Tallinna JK Legion (1)	11–0	Saku Sporting (5)	Tallinn
19:00		Report		Stadium: Sportland Arena; Attendance: 52; Referee: Dmitri Kirilov

30 September 2020	FC Tallinn (4)	2–0	Vändra JK Vaprus (2)	Tallinn
19:30		Report		Stadium: Lasnamäe Spordikompleksi kunstmurustaadion Attendance: 89; Referee: Miko Pupart

30 September 2020	Paide Linnameeskond (1)	13–0	Tallinna FC Pocarr (5)	Paide
19:00		Report		Stadium: Paide kunstmuruväljak Attendance: 48; Referee: Tomi Rahula

8 October 2020	Pärnu JK Vaprus (2)	0–1	Tartu JK Tammeka (1)	Pärnu
19:00		Report		Stadium: Pärnu Rannastaadion; Attendance: 326; Referee: Kristo Tohver

13 October 2020	Nõmme Kalju (1)	4–0	Tallinna JK Piraaja (4)	Tallinn
19:00		Report		Stadium: Hiiu kunstmurustaadion Attendance: 108; Referee: Denis Petrov

14 October 2020	Tallinna FC Eston Villa (5)	1–1 (4–3 p)	Põhja-Tallinna JK Volta (4)	Tallinn
20:30		Report		Stadium: Sõle kunstmuruväljak Attendance: 16; Referee: Kevin Kaivoja

21 October 2020	JK Pärnu Sadam (RL)	w/o	Kohtla-Järve JK Järve (2)
19:00		Report

12 November 2020	Põhja-Sakala (4)	w/o	FC Flora (1)
19:30		Report

== Fourth round (1/8) ==
Fourth round matches were played between 20 October 2020 and 23 January 2021.

20 October 2020	Tallinna FC Hell Hunt (5)	0–4	Kalev (1)	Tallinn
19:00		Report		Stadium: Nike Arena; Attendance: 92; Referee: Johann Kuldmäe

21 October 2020	Märjamaa Kompanii (5)	0–15	Tammeka (1)	Rapla
19:00		Report		Stadium: Rapla Jalgpallihall; Attendance: 111; Referee: Kristjan Kattus

21 October 2020	FC Tallinn (4)	0–3	FCI Levadia (1)	Tallinn
19:30		Report		Stadium: Lasnamäe Spordikompleksi kunstmurustaadion Attendance: 316; Referee: Maksim Ramazanov

28 October 2020	Nõmme Kalju (1)	3–0	TJK Legion (1)	Tallinn
19:00		Report		Stadium: Hiiu kunstmurustaadion Attendance: 152; Referee: Andrei Karhu

28 October 2020	Tallinna FC Eston Villa (5)	0–2	Maardu Linnameeskond (2)	Tallinn
20:30		Report		Stadium: Sõle kunstmuruväljak Attendance: 30; Referee: Kristjan-Eric Lääne

4 November 2020	Paide (1)	2–2 (2–3 p)	Tulevik (1)	Paide
18:00		Report		Stadium: Paide kunstmuruväljak Attendance: 67; Referee: Joonas Jaanovits

14 November 2020	Narva Trans (1)	3–0	JK Järve (2)	Narva
13:00		Report		Stadium: Narva Kalev-Fama staadion Attendance: 135; Referee: Tomi Rahula

23 January 2021	Kuressaare (1)	0–4	Flora (1)	Kuressaare
13:00		Report		Stadium: Kuressaare kunstmurustaadion Referee: Joonas Jaanovits

== Quarter-finals ==
Quarter-final matches were played 9-25 March 2021.

9 March 2021	Flora (1)	2–1	Tammeka (1)	Tallinn
20:00 (UTC+3)	Reinkort 38'; Vassiljev 59'	Report	Mätas 87'	Stadium: EJL jalgpallihall Referee: Kristo Külljastinen

10 March 2021	Narva Trans (1)	2–1	Kalev (2)	Tallinn
17:00 (UTC+3)	Kalenkovich 81', 82'	Report	Käos 67' (o.g.)	Stadium: EJL jalgpallihall Referee: Reelika Turi

10 March 2021	FCI Levadia (1)	2–0	Maardu Linnameeskond (2)	Tallinn
19:00 (UTC+3)	Krstevski 45+3'; Beglarishvili 50' (pen.)	Report		Stadium: EJL jalgpallihall Referee: Joonas Jaanovits

25 March 2021	Nõmme Kalju (1)	1–2 (a.e.t.)	Tulevik (1)	Tallinn
20:00 (UTC+3)	Mikhail Babichau 90+4'	Report	Herol Riiberg 67'; Ganiu Ogungbe 113'	Stadium: Sportland Arena; Referee: Siim Rinken

== Semi-finals ==
The draw for the semi-finals was made on 17 March 2021.

11 May 2021	Flora (1)	2–1	Narva Trans (1)	Tallinn
20:00 (UTC+3)	Zenjov 9'; Sappinen 78' (pen.)	Report	Gleb Pevtsov 19'	Stadium: A. Le Coq Arena; Referee: Kristo Külljastinen

12 May 2021	Tulevik (1)	0–2	FCI Levadia (1)	Viljandi
18:00 (UTC+3)		Report	Vaštšuk 79', 90'	Stadium: Viljandi linnastaadion Referee: Joonas Jaanovits

== Final ==
22 May 2021	FCI Levadia (1)	1–0	FC Flora (1)	Tallinn
19:30 (UTC+3)	Kirss 70'	Report		Stadium: A. Le Coq Arena; Referee: Juri Frischer
