= 2016–17 Estonian Cup =

Estonian football competition

Tournament details
- Country: Estonia
- Teams: 101

Final positions
- Champions: FCI Tallinn (1st title)
- Runners-up: Tartu Tammeka

Tournament statistics
- Matches played: 94
- Goals scored: 523 (5.56 per match)

The 2016–17 Estonian Cup was the 27th season of the Estonian main domestic football knockout tournament. FCI Tallinn won their first title after defeating Tammeka 2–0 in the final.

The winner of the Cup were to qualify for the 2017–18 UEFA Europa League, but as FCI Tallinn were already qualified for the Champions League as 2016 Meistriliiga champions the spot passed to Flora.

== First round ==
The draw was made by Estonian Football Association on 21 May 2016, on the half-time of the 2015–16 final of the same competition.

- League level of the club in the brackets.
- Rahvaliiga RL (people's league) is a league organized by Estonian Football Association, but not part of the main league system.

Home team	Score	Away team
31 May
FC Järva-Jaani (5)	w/o^{1}	(4) Tallinna FC Ararat TTÜ
Kohtla-Järve JK Järve (2)	3–0	(RL) Kohtla-Nõmme
Pärnu JK Poseidon (5)	7–0	(RL) Enamasti Pealekata
Rakvere JK Tarvas (1)	13–0	(RL) FC Sssolutions
Tallinna Depoo (6)	0–6	(2) Tallinna FC Infonet II
2 June
Raplamaa JK Märjamaa (6)	4–0	(5) Navi Vutiselts
SK Roosu (6)	w/o^{2}	(1) JK Sillamäe Kalev
4 June
FC Puhkus Mehhikos (RL)	0–2 (a.e.t.)	(3) FC Flora U19
5 June
Tallinna JK Piraaja (4)	11–1	(RL) FC Tallinna Wolves
Tallinna FC Soccernet (6)	8–1	(RL) FC Jõgeva Wolves II
FC Elva (3)	13–0	(RL) FC IceBears
6 June
Tallinna FC Olympic Olybet (5)	2–3 (a.e.t.)	(6) Tallinna FC TransferWise
7 June
SK Tääksi (5)	3–2	(6) FC Helios Tartu
FC Jõgeva Wolves (6)	7–0	(6) Tallinna FC Reaal
Tallinna FC Flora (1)	11–0	(RL) FC Peedu
Tallinna FC Levadia III (4)	8–0	(RL) JK Raudteetöölised
JK Fellin (RL)	0–1	(4) Keila JK
Tallinna FC Twister (6)	7–0	(5) Valga FC Warrior
Tallinna FC Castovanni Eagles II (6)	0–4	(5) Ambla Vallameeskond
8 June
JK Kernu Kadakas (5)	2–1	(RL) Rasmus Värki Jalgpallikool
FC Otepää (5)	1–2	(4) Narva United FC
9 June
FC Lelle (5)	1–6	(RL) FC Molycorp Silmet
FC Nõmme United (4)	24–0	(RL) JK Õismäe Torm
Koeru JK (5)	0–2	(5) Vastseliina FC Tannem
12 June
Tallinna FC Forza (4)	0–8	(1) Nõmme Kalju FC
15 June
Kuusalu JK Rada (4)	0–4	(5) Raplamaa JK
16 June
Tartu JK Tammeka (1)	2–0	(2) Tartu FC Santos
JK Tallinna Kalev (2)	14–0	(RL) Paduvere SK Illi
Kassisaba FC Igiliikur (5)	0–6	(3) Tartu JK Welco
18 June
Tallinna FC Castovanni Eagles (5)	w/o^{3}	(RL) JK Pedajamäe
JK Tallinna Kalev III (5)	0–4	(2) Viljandi JK Tulevik
19 June
Tallinna FC Eston Villa (5)	w/o^{4}	(5) JK Kaitseliit Kalev
22 June
Tartu FC Merkuur (4)	6–4	(5) FC Zenit Tallinn
26 June
FC Kuressaare (3)	w/o^{5}	(5) JK Väätsa Vald
JK Tammeka U21 (3)	1–4	(1) Pärnu Linnameeskond
28 June
Pirita JK Reliikvia (5)	1–2	(RL) JK Terav Sats
3 July
Tabasalu JK Charma (4)	1–2	(2) Maardu Linnameeskond

Notes

- Note 1: Tallinna JK Ararat TTÜ withdrew from the competition.
- Note 2: SK Roosu withdrew from the competition.
- Note 3: JK Pedajamäe withdrew from the competition.
- Note 4: JK Kaitseliit Kalev dissolved before the competition.
- Note 5: JK Väätsa Vald withdrew from the competition.

=== Byes ===
These teams were not drawn and secured a place in the second round without playing:

- Meistriliiga (Level 1): Tallinna FC Infonet, JK Narva Trans, Paide Linnameeskond, Tallinna FC Levadia,
- Esiliiga (2): FC Flora U21
- Esiliiga B (3): Raasiku FC Joker, Viimsi JK
- II Liiga (4): Jõgeva SK Noorus-96, Saue JK Laagri, Jõhvi FC Lokomotiv, Türi Ganvix JK, FC Kose, Viimsi JK II, Kiviõli FC Irbis, Tõrva JK, Tallinna JK Legion,
- III Liiga (5): EMÜ SK, Tartu Ülikool Fauna, FC Tartu, SK Imavere Forss, Maardu United, JK Loo, Läänemaa JK Haapsalu, Nõmme Kalju FC III
- IV Liiga (6): Tallinna JK Jalgpallihaigla, Tallinna Jalgpalliselts, Rumori Calcio Tallinn

== Second round ==
The draw for the second round was made on 16 June 2016.

Home team	Score	Away team
9 July
SK Tääksi (5)	5–0	(6) Tallinna JK Jalgpallihaigla
17 July
Tartu JK Welco (3)	0–8	(1) Tallinna FC Flora
20 July
Tallinna FC Soccernet (6)	1–5	(3) FC Kuressaare
24 July
Tallinna Jalgpalliselts (6)	0–3	(5) Tartu Ülikool Fauna
Ambla Vallameeskond (5)	2–5	(4) Tõrva JK
Jõhvi FC Lokomotiv (4)	1–1 (a.e.t.) (3–5) p	(3) Tallinna FC Flora U19
Tallinna FC Castovanni Eagles (5)	w/o^{6}	(5) EMÜ SK
FC Molycorp Silmet (RL)	w/o^{7}	(4) SK Imavere Forss
26 July
FC Järva-Jaani (5)	1–4	(4) Narva United FC
Maardu United (5)	2–10	(1) JK Sillamäe Kalev
Rakvere JK Tarvas (1)	5–1	(2) Maardu Linnameeskond
Tallinna FC Infonet (1)	9–0	(4) Tallinna JK Piraaja
2 August
Paide Linnameeskond (1)	1–0	(4) FC Nõmme United
FC Kose (4)	0–2	(5) Pärnu JK Poseidon
Saue JK Laagri (4)	6–1	(6) FC Jõgeva Wolves
Tartu JK Tammeka (1)	3–0	(5) Läänemaa JK Haapsalu
3 August
Viimsi JK II (4)	0–5	(2) Tallinna FC Infonet II
Raplamaa JK Märjamaa (6)	2–1	(4) Kiviõli FC Irbis
Kohtla-Järve JK Järve (2)	w/o	(6) Tallinna FC Twister
Raasiku FC Joker (3)	4–3 (a.e.t.)	(5) Raplamaa JK
FC Elva (3)	2–3	(2) JK Tallinna Kalev
Tallinna JK Legion (4)	1–0	(4) Türi Ganvix JK
JK Terav Sats (RL)	1–5	(4) Jõgeva SK Noorus-96
4 August
JK Kernu Kadakas (5)	5–3 (a.e.t.)	(5) Vastseliina FC Tannem
7 August
Viljandi JK Tulevik (2)	13–0	(5) JK Loo
8 August
Tallinna FC TransferWise (6)	1–6	(3) Viimsi JK
9 August
Pärnu Linnameeskond (1)	2–4	(1) Tallinna FC Levadia
10 August
Nõmme Kalju FC III (5)	0–5	(2) Tallinna FC Flora U21
Tartu FC Merkuur (4)	3–4 (a.e.t.)	(6) Rumori Calcio Tallinn
17 August
Tallinna FC Eston Villa (5)	4–4 (a.e.t.) (5–6) p	(5) FC Tartu
Tallinna FC Levadia III (4)	4–1	(4) Keila JK
20 September
JK Narva Trans (1)	0–2	(1) Nõmme Kalju FC

Notes

- Note 6: EMÜ SK were awarded a win as Castovanni Eagles fielded an unregistered player. The original score was 9–1.
- Note 7: Molycorp Silmet were awarded a win as SK Imavere Forss fielded an unregistered player. The original score was 2–3.

== Third round ==
The draw for the third round was made on 11 August 2016.

Home team	Score	Away team
24 August
Tartu Ülikool Fauna (5)	4–6	(5) EMÜ SK
1 September
Viljandi JK Tulevik (2)	1–0	(1) JK Sillamäe Kalev
Saue JK Laagri (4)	0–3	(2) Tallinna FC Infonet II
4 September
JK Terav Sats (RL)	0–2	(6) Raplamaa JK Märjamaa
FC Kuressaare (3)	3–2	(4) Tallinna JK Legion
Rumori Calcio Tallinn (6)	4–3	(5) JK Kernu Kadakas
6 September
FC Tartu (5)	0–11	(1) Tallinna FC Infonet
7 September
JK Tallinna Kalev (2)	5–0	(5) SK Tääksi
20 September
Rakvere JK Tarvas (1)	2–3	(1) Paide Linnameeskond
Tallinna FC Levadia III (4)	1–8	(1) Tartu JK Tammeka
21 September
FC Molycorp Silmet (RL)	6–5 (a.e.t.)	(3) Tallinna FC Flora U19
Kohtla-Järve JK Järve (2)	0–2	(2) Tallinna FC Flora U21
Narva United FC (4)	0–0 (a.e.t.) (3–2) p	(3) Viimsi JK
27 September
Tallinna FC Levadia (1)	7–0	(3) Raasiku FC Joker
28 September
Tallinna FC Flora (1)	5–0	(4) Tõrva JK
5 October
Nõmme Kalju FC (1)	10–0	(5) Pärnu JK Poseidon

== Fourth round ==
The draw for the fourth round was made on 21 September 2016.

Home team	Score	Away team
5 October
Tartu JK Tammeka (1)	5–1	(6) Rumori Calcio Tallinn
12 October
FC Kuressaare (3)	5–0	(6) Raplamaa JK Märjamaa
16 October
EMÜ SK (5)	0–5	(2) Viljandi JK Tulevik
18 October
Tallinna FC Infonet (1)	2–1	(1) Tallinna FC Levadia
19 October
Nõmme Kalju FC (1)	1–0	(1) Tallinna FC Flora
Tallinna FC Flora U21 (2)	1–3	(4) Narva United FC
Tallinna FC Infonet II (2)	1–4	(1) Paide Linnameeskond
15 November
FC Molycorp Silmet (RL)	0–11	(2) JK Tallinna Kalev

== Quarter-finals ==
The draw was made on 28 February 2017.

11 April 2017	Viljandi Tulevik (1)	0–1 (a.e.t.)	Tartu Tammeka (1)	Viljandi
18:00 (UTC+3)		Report	Aasmäe 120'	Stadium: Viljandi kunstmuruväljak Attendance: 160; Referee: Miko Pupart

11 April 2017	Tallinna Kalev (2)	0–3	Paide Linnameeskond (1)	Tallinn
19:00 (UTC+3)		Report	Sinilaid 30'; Kriisa 32' (o.g.); Hanson 37'	Stadium: Kalevi Keskstaadion; Attendance: 88; Referee: Tomi Rahula

12 April 2017	Nõmme Kalju (1)	1–1 (a.e.t.) (3–5 p)	FCI Tallinn (1)	Tallinn
18:00 (UTC+3)	Tjapkin 71'	Report	Voskoboinikov 88'	Stadium: Hiiu Stadium; Attendance: 206; Referee: Kristo Tohver
	Penalties
	Sidorenkov (penalty scored); Dmitrijev (penalty scored); Valikaev (penalty scored); Kirss (penalty missed)		(penalty scored) Kharin; (penalty scored) Voskoboinikov; (penalty scored) Nesterovski; (penalty scored) Nesterov; (penalty scored) Avilov

12 April 2017	Narva United (4)	3–1	Kuressaare (2)	Narva
19:00 (UTC+3)	Seleznjov 24'; Andreev 71'; Novikov 87'	Report	Suursaar 45'	Stadium: Narva Fama staadion Attendance: 85; Referee: Toomas Nõmmiste

== Semi-finals ==
The draw was held on 13 April 2017.

9 May 2017	Tartu Tammeka (1)	0–0 (a.e.t.) (4–2 p)	Paide Linnameeskond (1)	Tartu
18:00 (UTC+3)		Report		Stadium: Tamme Stadium; Attendance: 306; Referee: Kristo Tohver
	Penalties
	Paju (penalty missed); Kapper (penalty scored); Rande (penalty scored); Lorenz (penalty scored); Kiidron (penalty scored)		(penalty scored) Frolov; (penalty missed) Kase; (penalty scored) Jasper; (penalty missed) Vainumäe

10 May 2017	FCI Tallinn (1)	2–0	Narva United (4)	Tallinn
18:00 (UTC+3)	Nesterov 3'; Voskoboinikov 87'	Report		Stadium: Lasnamäe kunstmurustaadion Attendance: 170; Referee: Siim Rinken

== Final ==
27 May 2017	FCI Tallinn (1)	2–0	Tartu Tammeka (1)	Tallinn
16:00 (UTC+3)	Kruglov 9'; Prosa 47'	Report		Stadium: A. Le Coq Arena; Attendance: 1,871; Referee: Mart Martin

== See also ==
- 2016 Meistriliiga
- 2016 Esiliiga
- 2016 Esiliiga B
