= 2014–15 Estonian Cup =

Estonian football competition

Tournament details
- Country: Estonia
- Teams: 106

Final positions
- Champions: Nõmme Kalju (1st title)
- Runners-up: Paide Linnameeskond

Tournament statistics
- Matches played: 99
- Goals scored: 617 (6.23 per match)

The 2014–15 Estonian Cup was the 25th season of the Estonia's most prestigious football knockout tournament. The defending champions Levadia were eliminated after a walkover loss against 4 tier club in the third round as they fielded an unregistered player. Nõmme Kalju won their first title and qualified for the first qualifying round of the UEFA Europa League.

== First round ==
The draw was made by Estonian Football Association on 17 May 2014, before the 2013–14 final of the same competition. League level of the club in the brackets. Rahvaliiga (RL) is a league organized by Estonian Football Association, but not part of the main league system.

Home team	Score	Away team
1 June
Tallinna FC Infonet II (3)	7–0	(RL) FC Paidelona
4 June
HÜJK Emmaste (3)	5–0	(5) FC Olympic-Olybet
5 June
JK Kernu Kadakas (5)	0–2	(4) JK Kaitseliit Kalev
Tallinna Depoo (6)	3–8	(3) Maardu FC Starbunker
Saaremaa JK aameraaS (5)	w/o^{1}	(1) Jõhvi FC Lokomotiv
Tallinna FC Flora II (2)	4–4 (a.e.t.) (9–8 p)	(3) Tartu FC Santos
Pirita Reliikvia (6)	0–1	(4) Võru JK
Pärnu Linnameeskond (2)	3–4	(1) JK Tallinna Kalev
Tartu JK Tammeka (1)	5–2	(5) EMÜ SK
Viimsi MRJK (4)	6–1	(5) FC Järva-Jaani
Tallinna FC Ararat TTÜ (3)	w/o^{2}	(RL) FC Vinni
Kuusalu JK Rada (5)	9–0	(6) Tartu Ülikool Fauna
6 June
FC Tartu (5)	4–0	(RL) FC Peedu
JK Tallinna Kalev III (5)	3–2	(RL) JK Raudne Rusikas
7 June
FC Kuressaare (2)	7–0	(RL) JK Väätsa Vald
Narva United FC (5)	2–0	(RL) Rapla Lokomotiiv
Tallinna FC Dnipro (5)	w/o^{3}	(RL) Vutihoolikud
Tallinna FC Infonet (1)	16–0	(6) Pärnu JK Poseidon-Nirvaana
8 June
Maardu United (6)	8–0	(RL) FC Shnelli
Tartu Taara (RL)	0–8	(2) Vändra JK Vaprus
JK Tallinna Kalev Juunior (6)	6–1	(RL) FC Aseri/Askele
Tõrva JK (5)	6–0	(5) Vastseliina FC Aspen
JK Fellin/Club Red (RL)	1–1 (a.e.t.) (1–4 p)	(6) Raasiku Valla FC
Viimsi FC Igiliikur (5)	5–1	(RL) Virtsu Jalgpalliklubi
FC Twister (6)	1–4	(RL) JK Tartu Tehased
Rakvere JK Tarvas (2)	3–0	(5) FC Castovanni Eagles
Tartu FC Merkuur (5)	10–1	(RL) JK Õismäe Torm
Lootos FCR (RL)	2–5	(6) Tallinna Jalgpalliselts
JK Retro (5)	5–1	(5) Tallinna JK Piraaja
9 June
Saku Sporting (5)	3–1	(4) JK Loo
10 June
Tallinna FC Charma (5)	3–2	(6) JK Jalgpallihaigla
11 June
Narva JK Trans (1)	1–3	(1) JK Sillamäe Kalev
FC Lelle (5)	1–5	(4) FCF Tallinna Ülikool
FC Nõmme United (4)	10–0	(RL) Anija United
JK Ganvix Türi (4)	11–2	(RL) Kohtla-Nõmme
Keila JK (4)	12–1	(RL) FC Somnium
15 June
SK Imavere Forss (5)	6–1	(6) FC Helios
18 June
Raasiku FC Joker 1993 (4)	8–2	(RL) Viimsi Ehitus
26 June
Pärnu FC Metropool (4)	9–0	(6) FC Haiba
Saue JK Laagri (4)	2–1 (a.e.t.)	(6) FC Eston Villa
27 June
SK Tääksi (5)	1–1 (a.e.t.) (5–4 p)	(4) Läänemaa JK Haapsalu
2 July
Tallinna FC Flora (1)	7–0	(2) Viljandi JK Tulevik

Notes

- Note 1: Saaremaa JK aameraaS withdrew from the competition.
- Note 2: FC Vinni withdrew from the competition.
- Note 3: Vutihoolikud withdrew from the competition.

=== Byes ===
These teams were not drawn and secured a place in the second round without playing:

- Meistriliiga (Level 1): Tallinna FC Levadia, Nõmme Kalju FC, Paide Linnameeskond
- Esiliiga (2): Kiviõli FC Irbis, Tallinna FC Puuma
- Esiliiga B (3): Tallinna FC Flora III, FC Elva
- II Liiga (4): JK Welco Elekter, SK Noorus 96 Jõgeva, JK Visadus, Lasnamäe FC Ajax
- III Liiga (5): IAFA Estonia, Ambla Vallameeskond, Rapla JK Atli, Valga FC Warrior, FC Otepää, Navi Vutiselts, FC Kose
- IV Liiga (6): SK Tapa, FC Soccernet, Tallinna FC Reaal, FCF Tallinna Ülikool II
- Rahvaliiga (RL): –

== Second round ==
The draw for the second round was made on 12 June.

Home team	Score	Away team
25 June
Tallinna Jalgpalliselts (6)	0–2	(5) Viimsi FC Igiliikur
28 June
JK Tallinna Kalevi Juunior (6)	0–19	(1) Tallinna FC Levadia
2 July
Paide Linnameeskond (1)	17–0	(RL) JK Tartu Tehased
Kiviõli FC Irbis (2)	15–0	(5) Saku Sporting
Navi Vutiselts (5)	0–3	(1) JK Tallinna Kalev
5 July
SK Noorus 96 Jõgeva (4)	w/o	(4) Lasnamäe FC Ajax
6 July
FC Tartu (5)	8–1	(5) Rapla JK Atli
JK Retro (5)	9–2	(5) Valga FC Warrior
10 July
JK Kaitseliit Kalev (4)	0–3	(5) Tallinna FC Charma
11 July
Tartu JK Tammeka (1)	4–1	(5) Kuusalu JK Rada
13 July
JK Ganvix Türi (4)	4–1	(5) Tõrva JK
15 July
Võru JK (4)	5–2	(6) FC Soccernet
FC Otepää (5)	0–2	(2) Rakvere JK Tarvas
Tartu FC Merkuur (5)	0–4	(2) FC Kuressaare
Tallinna FC Ararat TTÜ (3)	5–0	(6) FCF Tallinna Ülikool II
Jõhvi FC Lokomotiv (1)	2–1 (a.e.t.)	(2) Vändra JK Vaprus
16 July
Tallinna FC Flora II (2)	3–1	(5) Narva FC United
FC Nõmme United (4)	2–9	(4) FCF Tallinna Ülikool
Pärnu FC Metropool (4)	3–1	(6) Raasiku Valla FC
JK Tallinna Kalev III (5)	w/o^{4}	(5) IAFA Estonia
20 July
SK Tapa (6)	4–0	(3) Tallinna FC Flora III
Tallinna SK Dnipro (5)	2–0	(6) Maardu United
22 July
Maardu FC Starbunker (3)	2–1	(3) HÜJK Emmaste
Raasiku FC Jokker 1993 (4)	0–2	(1) Tallinna FC Infonet
Tallinna FC Flora (1)	5–0	(4) JK Visadus
23 July
JK Welco Elekter (4)	0–0 (a.e.t.) (2–4p)	(5) FC Kose
FC Elva (3)	2–2 (a.e.t.) (2–3p)	(3) Tallinna FC Infonet II
SK Imavere Forss (5)	1–3	(4) Saue JK Laagri
Tallinna FC Reaal (6)	2–4	(5) SK Tääksi
5 August
JK Sillamäe Kalev (1)	11–0	(4) Viimsi MRJK
6 August
Keila JK (4)	2–1	(2) Tallinna FC Puuma
13 August
Nõmme Kalju FC (1)	18–0	(5) Ambla Vallameeskond

Notes

- Note 4: IAFA Estonia withdrew from the competition.

== Third round ==
The draw for the third round was made on 18 July.

Home team	Score	Away team
5 August
Jõhvi FC Lokomotiv (1)	3–1	(5) JK Tallinna Kalev III
6 August
Pärnu FC Metropool (4)	3–3 (a.e.t.) (1–3p)	(3) Tallinna FC Ararat TTÜ
SK Tääksi (5)	3–7	(2) Kiviõli FC Irbis
Tallinna FC Infonet II (3)	2–1	(2) Rakvere JK Tarvas
12 August
Võru JK (4)	0–11	(1) Tallinna FC Infonet
Tallinna FC Flora II (2)	3–1	(1) Tartu JK Tammeka
Tallinna FC Flora (1)	13–0	(5) FC Kose
14 August
FC Tartu (5)	2–5	(5) JK Retro
17 August
Tallinna FC Flora III (3)	2–3	(5) Viimsi FC Igiliikur
19 August
Tallinna FC Charma (5)	2–11	(4) FCF Tallinna Ülikool
26 August
SK Noorus 96 Jõgeva (4)	0–1	(1) JK Tallinna Kalev
2 September
Tallinna FC Levadia (1)	w/o^{5}	(4) Saue JK Laagri
Tallinna SK Dnipro (4)	0–13	(1) JK Sillamäe Kalev
Keila JK (4)	0–6	(1) Paide Linnameeskond
3 September
Maardu FC Starbunker (3)	5–1	(4) JK Ganvix Türi
1 October
Nõmme Kalju FC (1)	4–0	(2) FC Kuressaare

- Note 5: Saue Laagri were awarded a win as Levadia fielded an unregistered player.

== Fourth round ==
The draw for the fourth round was made on 21 August.

Home team	Score	Away team
24 September
FCF Tallinna Ülikool (4)	4–3 (a.e.t.)	(5) JK Retro
1 October
Tallinna FC Ararat TTÜ (3)	0–3	(3) Tallinna FC Infonet II
11 October
Maardu FC Starbunker (3)	0–4	(1) Nõmme Kalju FC
JK Tallinna Kalev (1)	0–3	(1) Jõhvi FC Lokomotiv
Paide Linnameeskond (1)	w/o^{6}	(2) Kiviõli FC Irbis
21 October
JK Sillamäe Kalev (1)	0–0 (a.e.t.) (4–2p)	(1) Tallinna FC Infonet
Tallinna FC Flora (1)	11–0	(4) Saue JK Laagri
22 October
Viimsi FC Igiliikur (5)	0–9	(2) Tallinna FC Flora II

- Note 6: Kiviõli FC Irbis withdrew from the competition.

== Quarter-finals ==
The draw was made on 2 March 2015.

28 April 2015	Paide Linnameeskond (1)	3–0	(2) Infonet II	Paide
18:45 UTC+3	Uwaegbulam 2', 52'; Varendi 53'	Report		Stadium: Paide linnastaadion Attendance: 30; Referee: Elar Tarkus

28 April 2015	Flora (1)	2–1	(1) Sillamäe Kalev	Tallinn
19:00 UTC+3	Tukiainen 12', 85'	Report	Sidorenkov 22'	Stadium: A. le Coq Arena; Attendance: 248; Referee: Kristo Tohver

29 April 2015	Nõmme Kalju (1)	5–3	(4) Jõhvi Lokomotiv	Tallinn
18:45 UTC+3	Neemelo 3'; Dmitrijev 17', 56'; Järva 31'; Listmann 68'	Report	Smirnov 48', 64', 74' (pen.)	Stadium: Hiiu Stadium; Attendance: 101; Referee: Rauno Kald

29 April 2015	Tallinna Ülikool (4)	3–5	(2) Flora II	Tallinn
19:00 UTC+3	Anniste 41'; Taska 61'; Klasen 74'	Report	Taska 21' (o.g.); Siim 33', 90+3'; Roog 41'; Riiberg 45+1'	Stadium: Sportland Arena; Attendance: 22; Referee: Tomi Rahula

== Semi-finals ==
The draw was made on 30 April 2015.

12 May 2015	Flora II (2)	1–3	(1) Paide Linnameeskond	Tallinn
19:00 UTC+3	Siim 59'	Report	Varendi 8'; Uwaegbulam 63'; Zahovaiko 84'	Stadium: A. Le Coq Arena I Attendance: 285; Referee: Andrei Karhu

13 May 2015	Flora (1)	1–2	(1) Nõmme Kalju	Tallinn
19:00 UTC+3	Jürgenson 15'	Report	Kimbaloula 75'; Neemelo 83'	Stadium: A. Le Coq Arena; Attendance: 438; Referee: Kristo Tohver

== Final ==
30 May 2015	Paide Linnameeskond (1)	0–2	(1) Nõmme Kalju	Tallinn
16:30 UTC+3		Report	Dmitrijev 45+1'; Kimbaloula 76'	Stadium: A. Le Coq Arena; Attendance: 2,441; Referee: Juri Frischer

== See also ==
- 2014 Meistriliiga
- 2014 Esiliiga
- 2014 Esiliiga B
