= 2017–18 Estonian Cup =

Estonian football competition

Tournament details
- Country: Estonia
- Teams: 98

Final positions
- Champions: FCI Levadia (9th title)
- Runners-up: Flora

Tournament statistics
- Matches played: 97
- Goals scored: 610 (6.29 per match)

The 2017–18 Estonian Cup was the 28th season of the Estonian main domestic football knockout tournament. FCI Levadia won their ninth title after defeating Flora in the final.

The winner of the Cup were to qualify for the first qualifying round of the 2018–19 UEFA Europa League, but as FCI Levadia were already qualified the spot passed to Narva Trans.

== First Round (1/64) ==
The draw was made by Estonian Football Association on 27 May 2017.

- League level of the club in the brackets.
- Rahvaliiga RL (people's league) is a league organized by Estonian Football Association, but not part of the main league system.

Home team	Score	Away team
10 June
Viimsi JK II (4)	0–13	Nõmme Kalju FC (1)
11 June
JK Piraaja Tallinn (4)	1–2	FC Maardu Aliens (6)
15 June
Tallinna FC Soccernet (6)	1–3	Kohtla-Nõmme (RL)
20 June
FC Jõgeva Wolves II (6)	3–2	JK Õismäe Torm (RL)
Pirita JK Reliikvia (5)	1–5	Rakvere JK Tarvas (2)
FC Flora U21 (2)	10–0	Rumori Calcio II (RL)
Anija JK (6)	7–0	FC Puhkus Mehhikos (RL)
21 June
JK Väätsa Vald (5)	0–1	SK Tääksi (5)
Tallinna FC TransferWise (6)	2–0	FC Tallinna Wolves (RL)
Raplamaa JK (4)	0–1	Tartu JK Welco (2)
FC Otepää (4)	6–0	Tallinna JK Jalgpallihaigla (6)
JK Kernu Kadakas (5)	7–2	JK Raudteetöölised (RL)
Paide Linnameeskond (1)	27–0	FC Hiiu United (RL)
Navi Vutiselts (5)	2–2 (a.e.t.) (2–4 p)	Kuusalu JK Rada (5)
FC Kose (5)	1–10	Raasiku FC Joker (3)
FC Flora U19 (4)	5–0	FC Vastseliina (5)
Rakvere JK Tarvas II (6)	0–7	Kohtla-Järve JK Järve (3)
FC Tartu (5)	3–1	Tallinna FC Eston Villa (5)
Kadrina SK Moe (6)	4–1	Põlva FC Lootos (6)
FCP Pärnu (6)	1–4	Türi Ganvix JK (4)
NPM Silmet (RL)	2–0	Maarjamäe FC Igiliikur (6)
Tartu Ülikool Fauna (5)	1–0	Viimsi Lõvid (RL)
Saue JK Laagri (4)	10–2	Rasmus Värki Jalgpallikool (RL)
Lihula JK (5)	7–1	FC Elbato (RL)
Tartu JK Tammeka U21 (3)	6–1	Tallinna FC Olympic Olybet (6)
Jõgeva SK Noorus-96 (4)	4–1 (a.e.t.)	SK Imavere (4)
22 June
FC Ararat Tallinn (4)	5–3 (a.e.t.)	Tallinna FC Zapoos (6)
Paide Linnameeskond III (5)	12–1	Pärnu JK Poseidon II (6)
FCI Tallinn (1)	7–0	FCI Tallinn U21 (2)
FC Levadia Tallinn (1)	3–0	FC Nõmme United (4)
JK Narva Trans (1)	6–1	Maardu Linnameeskond (2)
FC Jõgeva Wolves (5)	5–1	FK Odratakkel (RL)
28 June
FC Järva-Jaani (5)	18–2	JK 32.KK (RL)
17 July
FC Flora (1)	17–1	Tartu FC Helios (5)

=== Byes ===
These teams were not drawn and secured a place in the second round without playing:

- Meistriliiga (Level 1): JK Sillamäe Kalev, Tartu JK Tammeka, Pärnu JK Vaprus, Viljandi JK Tulevik
- Esiliiga (2): FC Santos Tartu, JK Tallinna Kalev, FC Kuressaare, FC Elva
- Esiliiga B (3): Viimsi JK
- II Liiga (4): Tallinna FC Levadia III, Tallinna JK Legion, Maardu United, Kohtla-Järve JK Järve II, Narva United FC
- III Liiga (5): Põhja-Tallinna JK Volta, JK Tallinna Kalev III, Rumori Calcio Tallinn, Suure-Jaani United, Koeru JK, Ambla Vallameeskond, JK Loo, Pärnu JK Poseidon, Tallinna FC Castovanni Eagles, FC Zenit Tallinn, Läänemaa JK, FC Lelle
- IV Liiga (6): Tallinna Depoo, Kohila Püsivus, FC Warrior Valga
- Rahvaliiga (RL): JK Rapla Lokomotiiv

== Second round (1/32) ==
The draw for the second round was made on 28 June 2017.

Home team	Score	Away team
16 July
FC Kuressaare (2)	12–0	Kadrina SK Moe (6)
18 July
Kohtla-Järve JK Järve II (4)	0–8	FC Flora U21 (2)
JK Tallinna Kalev (2)	c	Rakvere JK Tarvas (2)
19 July
FC Flora U19 (4)	0–1	Tartu JK Welco (2)
23 July
FC Maardu Aliens (6)	6–1	SK Tääksi (5)
Maardu United (4)	10–0	Valga FC Warrior (6)
FC Jõgeva Wolves II (6)	0–3	Kohila Püsivus (6)
Tallinna FC TransferWise (6)	3–2 (a.e.t.)	Tartu Ülikool Fauna (5)
FC Lelle (5)	2–2 (a.e.t.) (4–2 p)	Kohtla-Nõmme (RL)
24 July
Tallinna FC Castovanni Eagles (5)	0–4	FCI Tallinn (1)
JK Kernu Kadakas (5)	2–1	JK Rapla Lokomotiv (RL)
Kuusalu JK Rada (5)	2–1 (a.e.t.)	JK Loo (5)
Viimsi JK (3)	6–1	FC Jõgeva Wolves (5)
Türi Ganvix JK (4)	12–1	Tallinna Depoo (6)
25 July
JK Sillamäe Kalev (1)	1–2 (a.e.t.)	FC Levadia Tallinn (1)
Anija JK (6)	5–1	Lihula JK (5)
FC Järva-Jaani (5)	1–4	Põhja-Tallinna JK Volta (5)
Tallinna FC Levadia III (4)	3–0	Tallinna JK Legion (4)
FC Zenit Tallinn (5)	5–2	FC Otepää (4)
FC Elva (2)	8–0	Tallinna FC Ararat TTÜ (4)
Paide Linnameeskond (1)	7–3	Jõgeva SK Noorus-96 (4)
JK Tallinna Kalev III (5)	1–5	FC Tartu (5)
26 July
Narva United FC (4)	2–1	Pärnu JK Vaprus (1)
Pärnu JK Poseidon (5)	2–0	Raasiku FC Joker (3)
FC Santos Tartu (2)	0–3	Paide Linnameeskond III (5)
Ambla Vallameeskond (5)	1–4	Läänemaa JK (5)
Koeru JK (5)	0–1	Nõmme Kalju FC (1)
Rumori Calcio Tallinn (5)	6–0	NPM Silmet (RL)
JK Narva Trans (1)	8–0	Suure-Jaani United (5)
27 July
Kohtla-Järve JK Järve (3)	w/o	Saue JK Laagri (4)
1 August
Viljandi JK Tulevik (1)	1–0	Tartu JK Tammeka (1)
2 August
Tartu JK Tammeka U21 (3)	0–7	FC Flora (1)

== Third round (1/16) ==
The draw for the third round was made on 27 July 2017.

Home team	Score	Away team
6 August
FC Kuressaare (2)	9–1	Kuusalu JK Rada (5)
8 August
FC Levadia Tallinn (1)	3–1	Paide Linnameeskond (1)
Maardu United (4)	3–3 (a.e.t.) (4–3 p)	Tallinna FC TransferWise (6)
JK Narva Trans (1)	9–2	Tallinna FC Levadia III (4)
FCI Tallinn (1)	16–0	Anija JK (6)
Narva United FC (4)	0–8	FC Flora (1)
Kohila Püsivus (6)	0–8	Viljandi JK Tulevik (1)
9 August
Viimsi JK (3)	0–2	FC Flora U21 (2)
Rakvere JK Tarvas (2)	4–0	Pärnu JK Poseidon (5)
Nõmme Kalju FC (1)	8–0	FC Lelle (5)
Läänemaa JK (5)	2–1	Türi Ganvix JK (4)
Põhja-Tallinna JK Volta (5)	5–1	FC Zenit Tallinn (5)
Paide Linnameeskond III (5)	11–0	FC Tartu (5)
Rumori Calcio Tallinn (5)	3–2	JK Kernu Kadakas (5)
30 August
Kohtla-Järve JK Järve (3)	5–0	Tartu JK Welco (2)
FC Maardu Aliens (6)	0–3	FC Elva (2)

== Fourth round (1/8) ==
The draw for the fourth round was made on 17 August 2017.

Home team	Score	Away team
19 September
Läänemaa JK (5)	1–7	FCI Tallinn (1)
FC Flora (1)	2–0	FC Elva (2)
20 September
Tallinna FC Levadia (1)	7–0	Kohtla-Järve JK Järve (3)
Viljandi JK Tulevik (1)	w/o	Maardu United (4)
Nõmme Kalju FC (1)	1–1 (a.e.t.) (5–4 p)	Paide Linnameeskond III (5)
Põhja-Tallinna JK Volta (5)	0–3	FC Flora U21 (2)
Rumori Calcio Tallinn (5)	0–6	FC Kuressaare (2)
27 September
JK Narva Trans (1)	2–0 (a.e.t.)	Rakvere JK Tarvas (2)

== Quarter-finals ==
The draw was made on 22 February 2018. At the end of the 2017 league season Levadia and FCI Tallinn merged. The second reserve team of FCI Tallinn, playing in the fourth league, inherited the club's name and cup entry.

17 April 2018	Nõmme Kalju (1)	0–1	FCI Levadia (1)	Tallinn
18:00 (UTC+3)		Report	Morozov 9'	Stadium: Hiiu Stadium; Referee: Kristo Külljastinen

17 April 2018	Narva Trans (1)	6–0	FCI Tallinn (4)	Narva
19:00 (UTC+3)	Zakarlyuka 11'; Barkov 68'; Plotnikov 75'; Eensalu 76' (o.g.); Proshin 84'; Mihhailov 90+1'	Report		Stadium: Narva Kalev-Fama staadion Referee: Martti Pukk

18 April 2018	Kuressaare (1)	0–7	Flora (1)	Kuressaare
18:00 (UTC+3)		Report	Järvelaid 18'; Saliste 33'; Sorga 57', 62', 64'; Poom 79'; Beglarishvili 84'	Stadium: Kuressaare kunstmurustaadion Referee: Tomi Rahula

18 April 2018	Flora U21 (2)	7–3	Viljandi Tulevik (1)	Tallinn
19:00 (UTC+3)	Kask 12'; Kariste 29'; Männilaan 44', 53'; Šapovalov 83', 90', 90+1'	Report	Peips 15'; Mõttus 58'; Post 64'	Stadium: Sportland Arena; Referee: Karl Koppel

== Semi-finals ==
The draw was made on 19 April 2018.

8 May 2018	Narva Trans (1)	0–5	FCI Levadia (1)	Narva
18:00 (UTC+3)		Report	Debelko 2', 5', 47'; Kharin 9'; Andreev 51'	Stadium: Kreenholmi Stadium; Referee: Joonas Jaanovits

9 May 2018	Flora U21 (2)	3–9	Flora (1)	Tallinn
18:00 (UTC+3)	Šapovalov 74', 78'; Männilaan 82'	Report	Sorga 3', 6', 22', 36', 56', 60', 80'; Riiberg 6'; Alliku 86'	Stadium: Flora Lilleküla Stadium; Referee: Denis Petrov

== Final ==
Final was played on 19 May 2018 at A. Le Coq Arena.

19 May 2018	FCI Levadia (1)	1–0	Flora (1)	Tallinn
16:00 (UTC+3)	Debelko 67'	Report		Stadium: A. Le Coq Arena; Attendance: 2,369; Referee: Kristo Tohver

== See also ==
- 2017 Meistriliiga
- 2018 Meistriliiga
- 2017 Esiliiga
- 2018 Esiliiga
- 2017 Esiliiga B
- 2018 Esiliiga B
