= Tõrva JK =

Estonian football club

- Full name: Tõrva Jalgpalliklubi
- Founded: 2008; 17 years ago
- Ground: Soe stadium
- Manager: Zurab Kvaratshelija
- 2018: II Liiga South/West, 12th
- Website: instagram jktorva
Home colours	Away colours

Tõrva JK is a football club based in Tõrva, Estonia. Founded in 2008, it played in II Liiga in 2018. Starting from the 2019 season Tõrva JK and Tarvastu JK played together as one team.

The team also has a reserve team Tõrva JK II, which plays in IV Liiga.

== Current squad ==
As of 31 May 2017.

Note: Flags indicate national team as defined under FIFA eligibility rules; some limited exceptions apply. Players may hold more than one non-FIFA nationality.

No.	Pos.	Nation	Player
1	GK	EST	Ville Pähklamäe
4	DF	EST	Erik Raal
6	FW	EST	Juhan Kondike
7	MF	EST	Kurmo Külm
9	FW	EST	Mattias Reigo
10	FW	EST	Feliks Golding
11	MF	EST	Robert Hansson
15	FW	EST	Martin Orlo
18	FW	EST	Heigo Heinleht

No.	Pos.	Nation	Player
19	MF	EST	Alvar Kasak
20	MF	EST	Joonas Horn
21	DF	EST	Mairo Vister
22	DF	EST	Riiko Kaseorg
23	MF	EST	Marek Vister
26	MF	EST	Heigo Kosemets
31	DF	EST	Reivo Kandi
32	DF	EST	Asser-Enri Soro
44	DF	EST	Erki Henrikson

== Statistics ==
=== League and Cup ===
Season	Division	Pos	Teams	Pld	W	D	L	GF	GA	GD	Pts	Top Goalscorer	Estonian Cup	Notes
2008	IV Liiga S	10	12	22	4	3	15	30	107	−77	15	Martin Orlo (13)	–	as Tõrva FC Warrior
2009	IV Liiga S	7	11	20	7	5	8	60	52	+8	26	Andres Saar (10)	–	as Tõrva FC Warrior
2010	IV Liiga S	5	11	20	7	4	9	50	70	−20	25	Martin Orlo (9)	–	as Tõrva FC Warrior
2011	IV Liiga S	5	9	16	8	2	6	46	37	+9	26	Martin Orlo (16)	–	as Tõrva FC Warrior
2012	IV Liiga S	4	12	22	14	4	4	95	42	+53	46	Oliver Suur (32)	–	as Tõrva FC Warrior
2013	III Liiga S	5	12	22	13	0	9	51	42	+9	39	Oliver Suur (18)	First round	as Tõrva JK
2014	III Liiga S	1	12	22	16	4	2	64	26	+38	52	Oliver Suur (28)	Second round	as Tõrva JK
2015	II Liiga S/W	8	14	26	10	5	11	60	45	+15	35	Oliver Suur (14)	Quarter-final	as Tõrva JK
2016	II Liiga S/W	7	14	26	12	1	13	60	52	+8	37	Oliver Suur (22)	Third round	as Tõrva JK
2017	II Liiga S/W	13	14	26	8	4	14	41	67	-26	28	Juhan Kondike (12)	-	as Tõrva JK
2018	II Liiga S/W	12	14	26	8	2	16	50	81	-31	26	Asser-Enri Soro (13)	-	as Tõrva JK
