= Maardu United =

Estonian football club

- Full name: Maardu United
- Founded: 2014; 12 years ago
- Ground: Maardu Stadium
- Manager: Nikolai Kostroma
- 2018: II liiga N/E, 14th (disqualified)
Home colours	Away colours

Maardu United is a football club, based in Maardu, Estonia.

The club also has a reserve team, Maardu United II, which plays in IV Liiga.

Founded in 2014, the club has played in the II Liiga since 2017. After their second forfeit during the 2018 season, they were disqualified from the league.

== Players ==
=== Current squad ===
As of 2 May 2017.

Note: Flags indicate national team as defined under FIFA eligibility rules; some limited exceptions apply. Players may hold more than one non-FIFA nationality.

No.	Pos.	Nation	Player
1		EST	Jevgeni Afonin
2		EST	Kirill Bogdanets
3		EST	Aleksander Fadejev
4		EST	Aleksandr Gamonovitš
5		EST	Nikita Golovin
6			Jevgeni Grafski
7			Juri Javljanski
8			Deniss Kolmakov
9		EST	Nikolai Kostroma
10			Dmitri Kravtsov
11		EST	Deniss Kudrjašov
12		EST	Levani Lagvilava
13			Vladimir Ljahhovetski
14		RUS	Maxim Meshcheryakov

No.	Pos.	Nation	Player
15		EST	Deniss Molodtsov
16		RUS	Dmitry Mustafaev
17		EST	Andrei Nazarov
18		EST	Jevgeni Novitski
19		EST	Denis Pavlovl
20			Igor Plotnikov
21		EST	Miroslav Poptšenko
22			Vitaly Rakhanskiy
23		EST	Aleksandr Serednjak
24		EST	Konstantin Žavoronkov
25		EST	Roman Timošin
26			Maksim Titkov
27		EST	Sergei Tomaševitš
28		EST	Jevgeni Volkov

== Statistics ==
=== League and Cup ===
Season	Division	Pos	Pld	W	D	L	GF	GA	GD	Pts	Top goalscorer	Cup	Notes
2014	IV Liiga E	2	22	17	2	2	134	24	+110	53	Dmitri Kravtsov (32)	Second round	
2015	III Liiga E	3	22	13	1	8	70	36	+34	40	Juri Javljanski and Nikolai Gretšits (18)	Second round	
2016	III Liiga E	1	22	18	0	4	85	34	+51	54	Juri Javljanski (29)	Second round	
2017	II Liiga E/N	12	26	7	5	14	38	71	-33	26	Juri Javljanski (12)	Second round	
2018	II Liiga E/N	14	26	3	2	21	17	35	-18	11	Andrei Nazarov and Jevgeni Tšigrinov (6)	Second round	
