= 2018 II liiga =

Estonian football league season for fourth division

II liiga
- Season: 2018

The 2018 II liiga was the 24th season of the II liiga, fourth-highest league for association football clubs in Estonia.

== II Liiga North/East ==
=== 2018 season ===
II liiga
- Season: 2018
- Champions: Põhja-Tallinna JK Volta
- Relegated: Tartu Santos II; Maardu United
- Matches played: 169
- Goals scored: 667 (3.95 per match)
- Top goalscorer: (Estonia) Vassili Kulik (Sillamäe Kalev, 23)
- Biggest home win: 9-0 (Trans II vs Maardu LM II) (FCI Tallinn vs Trans II)
- Biggest away win: 0-7 (Tammeka III vs Volta)
- Highest scoring: 9 goals (five games)

2018 II N/E Liiga consists of 14 different teams. Nine of them remain the same, two were promoted from III Liiga North, one from III Liiga South and two were relegated from higher divisions. Promoted teams were Põhja-Tallinna JK Volta, Tartu JK Welco II and Tartu JK Tammeka III and relegated teams were JK Sillamäe Kalev and Raasiku FC Joker. These teams replaced Tartu FC Merkuur (dissolved), Tallinna JK Legion, Võru FC Helios and Lasnamäe FC Ajax (promoted) and Tallinna JK Legion II (transferred to II S/W Liiga). There were two name changes as well: Narva United FC is now JK Narva Trans II and Tartu JK Tammeka U19's new name is Tartu JK Tammeka III. Tallinna FC Levadia III is now named FCI Tallinn because of the merging of these two teams.

==== Clubs ====
Location of the 2018 II liiga N/E teams

The following clubs are competing in II liiga North/East during the 2018 season.

Club	2017	Location	Titles	Last best finish
Ararat	13th	Tallinn	0	3rd (2008)
FCI Tallinn	2nd	Tallinn	0	2nd (2017)
Joker	8th in Esiliiga B	Raasiku	0	2nd (2014)
Järve II ^{a, b, c}	14th	Jõhvi	0	14th (2017)
Maardu LM II ^{a, b}	10th	Maardu	0	10th (2017)
Maardu United ^{a, b}	12th	Maardu	0	12th (2017)
Noorus ^{a, b}	7th	Jõgeva	0	5th (2013)
Piraaja ^{b}	9th	Tallinn	0	8th (2015)
Santos II ^{a, b}	11th	Tartu	0	11th (2017)
Sillamäe	10th in Meistriliiga	Sillamäe	2	1st (2000)
Tammeka III ^{a, b, c}	5th in III Liiga South	Tartu	0	–
Trans II ^{a, b}	8th	Narva	0	4th (2016)
Volta ^{a, b}	1st in III Liiga North	Tallinn	0	–
Welco II ^{a, b}	1st in III Liiga South	Tartu	0	–

^{a} – never been relegated from II liiga
^{b} – never played in Esiliiga B/Esiliiga
^{c} – ineligible for promotion to Esiliiga B

=== Results ===
==== League table ====
Pos	Team	Pld	W	D	L	GF	GA	GD	Pts	Promotion, qualification or relegation
1	Põhja-Tallinna Volta (C, P)	26	18	3	5	63	22	+41	57	Promotion to Esiliiga B
2	FCI Tallinn (Q)	26	18	3	5	71	29	+42	57	Qualification to Promotion play-offs
3	Sillamäe Kalev	26	17	5	4	66	38	+28	56	
4	Jõgeva Noorus-96	26	13	5	8	62	49	+13	44	
5	Raasiku Joker	26	14	2	10	56	44	+12	44	
6	Narva Trans II	26	12	3	11	56	45	+11	39	
7	Tallinna Ararat	26	11	5	10	43	47	−4	38	
8	Kohtla-Järve Järve II (Note: Reserve teams are ineligible for promotion.)	26	11	1	14	41	50	−9	34	
9	Tartu Welco II	26	9	5	12	40	50	−10	32	
10	Maardu Linnameeskond II	26	9	3	14	38	62	−24	30	
11	Tallinna Piraaja	26	8	5	13	46	60	−14	29	
12	Tartu Tammeka III (Q)	26	8	4	14	31	60	−29	28	Qualification to Relegation play-offs
13	Tartu Santos II (R)	26	7	2	17	37	76	−39	23	Relegation to III Liiga
14	Maardu United (D)	26	3	2	21	17	35	−18	11	Disqualified

Updated to match(es) played on 28 October 2018. Source:
Rules for classification: 1) points; 2) goal difference; 3) number of goals scored
(C) Champions; (D) Disqualified; (P) Promoted; (Q) Qualified for the phase indicated; (R) Relegated

==== Results table ====
Home \ Away	ARA	FCI	JOK	JÄR	MAA	MLM	NRS	PIR	SAN	SIL	TAM	TRA	VOL	WEL
Tallinna Ararat	—	2–2	1–4	3–1	—	1–0	2–6	1–2	1–0	0–0	6–1	2–2	1–0	6–3
FCI Tallinn	3–0	—	1–3	1–4	—	6–2	3–3	2–0	3–0	5–1	4–0	9–0	0–3	2–1
Raasiku Joker	3–2	0–1	—	5–0	—	3–1	2–2	5–1	4–0	3–4	2–0	2–0	1–4	4–4
Kohtla-Järve Järve II	0–1	1–3	1–0	—	1–2	4–0	2–5	5–2	4–0	2–4	5–0	1–0	0–2	1–1
Maardu United	3–2	0–2	2–4	—	—	—	—	—	—	2–4	—	2–6	2–6	1–0
Maardu Linnameeskond II	1–2	0–3	1–2	4–0	w/o (Note: Match awarded to Maardu Linnameeskond II, because Maardu United forfeited the match.)	—	0–3	4–2	5–1	4–0	2–0	3–2	1–1	2–2
Jõgeva Noorus-96	3–1	2–4	w/o (Note: Match awarded to Jõgeva SK Noorus-96, because Raasiku FC Joker forfeited the match.)	1–4	8–1	2–0	—	4–1	1–3	1–3	4–2	2–1	1–1	1–3
Tallinna Piraaja	2–2	1–6	0–2	3–0	1–1	1–3	2–2	—	5–1	1–4	2–2	w/o (Note: Match awarded to Tallinna JK Piraaja, because Narva JK Trans II fielded a disqualified player.)	1–2	2–4
Tartu Santos II	1–5	0–4	4–2	4–1	1–1	6–2	2–0	5–2	—	0–3	1–1	1–3	1–2	1–2
Sillamäe Kalev	4–0	3–1	4–1	4–0	—	3–1	3–1	2–2	4–1	—	3–1	2–2	1–1	4–2
Tartu Tammeka III	3–0	0–0	2–1	1–2	w/o (Note: Match awarded to Tartu JK Tammeka III, because Maardu United forfeited the match. Furthermore, Maardu United was disqualified from the competition after they had forfeited two matches.)	5–0	3–3	1–3	4–1	1–2	—	2–1	0–7	1–0
Narva Trans II	1–1	w/o (Note: Match awarded to Narva JK Trans II, because FCI Tallinn fielded an ineligible player.)	3–0	1–2	—	9–0	2–3	1–0	5–1	5–3	5–0	—	2–0	w/o (Note: Match awarded to Tartu JK Welco II, because Narva JK Trans II fielded an ineligible player.)
Põhja-Tallinna Volta	0–1	2–3	5–1	2–0	—	2–0	4–2	1–2	5–0	1–0	3–0	3–2	—	4–0
Tartu Welco II	2–0	0–4	1–2	1–0	—	2–2	0–2	0–3	7–2	1–1	3–1	1–2	0–2	—

Updated to match(es) played on 30 September 2018. Source: Jalgpall.ee
Legend: Blue = home team win; Yellow = draw; Red = away team win.

=== Statistics ===
==== Top scorers ====
As of 23 September 2018.

Rank	Player	Club	Goals
1	(Estonia) Vassili Kulik	Sillamäe Kalev	23
2	(Estonia) Vadim Mihhailov	Narva Trans II	19
2	(Estonia) Kirill Novikov	Sillamäe Kalev	19
2	(Estonia) Stenver Kleimann-Leimann	Jõgeva Noorus	19
5	(Estonia) Aleksei Šved	FCI Tallinn	16
5	(Nigeria) Princewill Ani	Põhja-Tallinna Volta	16
7	(Estonia) Rando Randjõe	Raasiku Joker	15
8	(Estonia) Kaarel Põldma	Jõgeva Noorus	14
8	(Estonia) Mihkel Paapsi	Tallinna Piraaja	14
10	(Estonia) Artjom Ostrovski	FCI Tallinn	11

==== Most viewed matches ====
As of 23 September 2018.

Home team	Away team	Score	Attendance
Põhja-Tallinna Volta	Sillamäe Kalev	1–0	340
Põhja-Tallinna Volta	Maardu LM II	2–0	291
Põhja-Tallinna Volta	FCI Tallinn	2–3	186

==== Least viewed matches ====
As of 23 September 2018.

Home team	Away team	Score	Attendance
FCI Tallinn	Tartu Santos II	3–0	7
FCI Tallinn	Kohtla-Järve Järve II	1–4	7
Tartu Santos II	Sillamäe Kalev	0–3	8

Attendances

Teams	Top home attendance	Low. home attendance	Avg. home attendance	Avg. away attendance
Tallinna FC Ararat TTÜ	39	2	21	40
FCI Tallinn	37	7	18	40
Raasiku FC Joker	116	37	50	38
Kohtla-Järve JK Järve II	43	11	26	33
Maardu Linnameeskond II	78	20	38	48
Maardu United	36	23	29	29
Jõgeva SK Noorus-96	48	11	23	31
Tallinna JK Piraaja	21	7	13	27
Tartu FC Santos II	35	8	18	34
JK Sillamäe Kalev	120	22	68	30
Tartu JK Tammeka III	62	11	35	40
Narva JK Trans II	85	21	39	43
Põhja-Tallinna JK Volta	291	46	102	41
Tartu JK Welco II	44	11	23	36

== II Liiga South/West ==
=== 2018 season ===
II Liiga South/West
- Number of clubs: 14
- Current champions: FC Nõmme United (2017)
- Most championships: FC Santos Tartu (3)
- Website: II Liiga

2018 II S/W Liiga consists of 14 different teams. Eight of them remain the same. Two were promoted from III Liiga West, one from III Liiga North and one from III Liiga East. They were Pärnu JK Poseidon, Läänemaa JK, JK Tallinna Kalev III and Paide Linnameeskond III. One team was transferred from II Liiga N/E. It was Tallinna JK Legion II. Remaining team was relegated from Esiliiga B, which was Viimsi JK. These teams replaced FC Nõmme United, Pärnu Jalgpalliklubi and FC Flora U19 (all promoted), Saue JK Laagri, SK Imavere and Viimsi JK II (all relegated). Also Tallinna JK Dünamo changed its name to Tallinna JK Legion II.

==== Clubs ====
Location of the 2018 II liiga S/W teams

The following clubs are competing in II liiga South/West during the 2018 season.

Club	2017	Location	Titles	Last best finish
Poseidon ^{a, b}	1st in III Liiga W	Pärnu	0	–
Ganvix ^{a, b}	5th	Türi	0	2nd (2015)
Legion II ^{a, b, c}	–	Tallinn	0	–
Kuressaare II ^{a}	10th	Kuressaare	1	1st (2003)
Kalev III ^{a, b}	3rd in III Liiga N	Tallinn	0	–
Läänemaa ^{a, b}	3rd in III Liiga W	Haapsalu	0	–
Otepää ^{a, b}	9th	Otepää	0	9th (2017)
Paide Linnameeskond III ^{a, b}	1st in III Liiga E	Paide	0	–
Raplamaa ^{a, b}	8th	Rapla	0	8th (2017)
Tabasalu ^{a, b}	3rd	Tallinn	0	3rd (2017)
Tulevik U21	4th	Viljandi	0	2nd (1994/95)
Tõrva ^{a, b}	13th	Karksi-Nuia	0	7th (2016)
Vaprus II ^{a, b}	12th	Pärnu	0	12th (2017)
Viimsi	7th in Esiliiga B	Haabneeme	1	1st (2012)

^{a} – never been relegated from II liiga
^{b} – never played in Esiliiga B/Esiliiga
^{c} – ineligible for promotion to Esiliiga B

=== Results ===
==== League table ====
Pos	Team	Pld	W	D	L	GF	GA	GD	Pts	Promotion, qualification or relegation
1	Paide Linnameeskond III (Note: Reserve teams are ineligible for promotion.) (C)	26	23	2	1	89	19	+70	71	
2	Viimsi (P)	26	21	2	3	97	19	+78	65	Promotion to Esiliiga B
3	Tabasalu (Q)	26	17	3	6	68	40	+28	54	Qualification to Promotion play-offs
4	Pärnu Vaprus II	26	13	2	11	74	53	+21	41	
5	Läänemaa	26	13	2	11	65	57	+8	41	
6	Tallinna Legion II	26	11	4	11	54	55	−1	37	
7	Pärnu Poseidon	26	10	3	13	45	62	−17	33	
8	Viljandi Tulevik U21	26	9	3	14	61	72	−11	30	
9	Kuressaare II	26	9	3	14	51	78	−27	30	
10	Türi Ganvix	26	9	3	14	40	72	−32	30	
11	Otepää	26	8	3	15	46	63	−17	27	
12	Tõrva (Q)	26	8	2	16	50	81	−31	26	Qualification to Relegation play-offs
13	Tallinna Kalev III (R)	26	7	4	15	45	74	−29	25	Relegation to III Liiga
14	Raplamaa (R)	26	4	4	18	40	80	−40	16	Relegation to III Liiga

Updated to match(es) played on 30 October 2018. Source:
Rules for classification: 1) points; 2) goal difference; 3) number of goals scored
(C) Champions; (P) Promoted; (Q) Qualified for the phase indicated; (R) Relegated

==== Results table ====
Home \ Away	GVX	KAL	KUR	LÄÄ	OTE	PAI	POS	RAP	TAB	TJK	TUL	TÕR	VII	VAP
Türi Ganvix	—	3–0	2–4	4–2	3–3	0–6	4–2	1–2	3–1	1–0	2–5	3–1	0–4	0–8
Tallinna Kalev III	6–1	—	4–2	1–1	2–0	0–5	4–0	2–2	2–1	3–6	4–2	0–3	1–1	1–2
Kuressaare II	0–0	4–1	—	3–0	5–0	1–6	1–3	5–3	0–2	0–1	2–2	2–4	1–11	3–0
Läänemaa	6–1	6–4	6–0	—	4–1	0–4	1–2	4–1	2–4	6–2	4–1	2–1	0–4	5–0
Otepää	1–1	1–0	3–3	2–4	—	0–2	4–1	3–2	1–2	2–1	4–3	3–5	1–2	4–3
Paide Linnameeskond III	4–0	1–0	6–1	4–3	3–1	—	3–0	4–1	5–0	3–1	2–1	4–1	2–1	5–2
Pärnu Poseidon	0–2	3–1	4–0	1–1	1–0	0–4	—	1–0	4–6	0–0	5–0	6–1	1–5	0–2
Raplamaa	1–2	3–5	2–4	1–2	1–0	1–1	1–3	—	2–2	5–1	1–2	1–1	1–3	0–4
Tabasalu	1–0	8–1	3–0	2–0	4–3	1–1	4–0	6–0	—	w/o (Note: Match awarded to Tallinna JK Legion II, because Tabasalu JK fielded a disqualified player.)	5–2	4–1	2–1	2–1
Tallinna Legion II	4–2	1–1	0–5	4–2	3–1	1–4	1–2	7–1	4–2	—	2–1	4–1	0–3	2–4
Viljandi Tulevik U21	4–2	2–0	2–1	3–0	1–3	1–3	4–2	4–5	1–1	0–4	—	6–1	1–6	4–4
Tõrva	2–1	6–1	1–2	0–3	0–3	0–3	7–2	5–3	1–3	1–1	1–6	—	1–3	3–2
Viimsi	4–0	3–0	5–0	w/o (Note: Match awarded to Läänemaa JK, because Viimsi JK fielded an ineligible player.)	4–1	2–1	1–1	7–0	3–0	3–1	5–1	8–0	—	5–1
Pärnu Vaprus II	1–2	7–1	7–2	5–0	3–1	0–3	5–1	1–0	1–2	2–2	2–0	5–2	2–3	—

Updated to match(es) played on 1 October 2018. Source: Jalgpall.ee
Legend: Blue = home team win; Yellow = draw; Red = away team win.

=== Statistics ===
==== Top scorers ====
As of 30 October 2018.

Rank	Player	Club	Goals
1	(Estonia) Ken-Marten Tammeveski	Viimsi JK	27
2	(Estonia) Tauri Tursk	Viimsi JK	20
3	(Estonia) Rauno Rikberg	Paide Linnameeskond III	19
4	(Estonia) Lauri Varendi	Paide Linnameeskond III	17
4	(Estonia) Aare Avila	Läänemaa JK	17
6	(Estonia) Eero Maling	Viljandi Tulevik U21	15
7	(Estonia) Denis Ruus	Legion II	14
7	(Estonia) Edwin Stüf	Tabasalu	14
7	(Estonia) Rasmus Tomson	Tabasalu	14
10	(Estonia) Rene Prans	Pärnu Vaprus II	13

==== Most viewed matches ====
As of 1 September 2018.

Home team	Away team	Score	Attendance
Tabasalu	Kuressaare II	3–0	468
Tabasalu	Läänemaa	2–0	418
Tabasalu	Pärnu Poseidon	4–0	399

==== Least viewed matches ====
As of 23 September 2018.

Home team	Away team	Score	Attendance
Tõrva	Tallinna Kalev III	6–1	2
Tallinna Kalev III	Viljandi Tulevik U21	4–2	4
Paide Linnameeskond III	Raplamaa	4–1	7

Attendances

Teams	Top home attendance	Low. home attendance	Avg. home attendance	Avg. away attendance
Ganvix	42	17	31	50
Kalev III	23	4	15	56
Kuressaare II	63	7	27	63
Legion II	78	10	38	47
Läänemaa	103	38	71	57
Otepää	42	10	21	27
Paide Linnameeskond III	69	7	25	58
Poseidon	68	11	35	67
Raplamaa	57	14	32	63
Tabasalu	468	191	321	40
Tulevik II	49	12	33	52
Tõrva	57	2	27	43
Vaprus II	120	13	33	47
Viimsi	72	11	39	55

== Post-Season ==
=== League winner ===
3 November 2018 Final	Paide Linnameeskond III	4–0	Põhja-Tallinna JK Volta	Tallinn
13:00	Tubarik 20', 60'; Rikberg 64', 66'	Report		Stadium: Kadrioru staadion Attendance: 120; Referee: Tanel Üprus

=== Promotion play-offs ===
4. November 2018 Semi-final	JK Tabasalu (II S/W 2nd)	4–-	FCI Tallinn (II N/E 2nd)	Tabasalu, Estonia
14:00	Tomson 32'; Nahk 35', 78'; Stüf 46'	Report		Stadium: Tabasalu Arena; Attendance: 347; Referee: Reelika Turi

11. November 2018 Semi-final	FCI Tallinn (II N/E 2nd)	-–+	JK Tabasalu (II S/W 2nd)	Tallinn, Estonia
17:00		Report		Stadium: Infoneti Lasnamäe Jalgpallihall

17. November 2018 Final	JK Tabasalu (II S/W 3rd)	3–0	Lasnamäe FC Ajax (Esiliiga B 9th)	Tabasalu, Estonia
13:00	Lõppe 39'; Stüf 63'; Samulin 76' (o.g.)	Report		Stadium: Tabasalu Arena; Attendance: 225; Referee: Martti Pukk

24. November 2018 Final	Lasnamäe FC Ajax (Esiliiga B 9th)	1–4	JK Tabasalu (II S/W 3rd)	Tallinn, Estonia
13:00	Kobjakov 45'	Report	Lõppe 26' (pen.); Tomson 54' 68'; Maidla 89'	Stadium: Ajaxi staadion Attendance: 44; Referee: Miko Pupart

=== Relegation play-offs ===
20. October 2018 Semi-final	Tallinna FC Zapoos (III N 2nd)	–:+	JK Loo (III E 2nd)	Tallinn, Harjumaa
12.00		Report		Stadium: Kalevi Keskstaadioni kunstmuruväljak Referee: Paul Kask

25. October 2018 Semi-final	JK Loo (III E 2nd)	+:–	Tallinna FC Zapoos (III N 2nd)	Loo, Harjumaa
19.00		Report		Stadium: Loo kunstmuruväljak

04. November 2018 Final	JK Loo (III E 2nd)	2–3	Tartu JK Tammeka III (II N/E 12th)	Loo, Harjumaa
14:00	Kubber 24'; Allmann 73'	Report	Enno 2', 13'; Toomsalu 86'	Stadium: Loo kunstmuruväljak Attendance: 8 Referee: Martti Pukk

11. November 2018 Final	Tartu JK Tammeka III (II N/E 12th)	3–0	JK Loo (III E 2nd)	Tartu, Tartumaa
15:00	Enno 27'; Palu 57' (o.g.); Pärn 60'	Report		Stadium: Tartu Sepa jalgpallikeskuse kunstmuruväljak Attendance: 27; Referee: Viljar Pennert

20. October 2018 Semi-final	SK Imavere (III S 2nd)	–:+	Põhja-Tallinna JK Volta II (III W 2nd)	Järva, Järvamaa
13.00				Stadium: Imavere stadium

27. October 2018 Semi-final	Põhja-Tallinna JK Volta II (III W 2nd)	+:–	SK Imavere (III S 2nd)	Tallinn, Harjumaa
18.00		Report		Stadium: Sõle jalgpallihall

4. November 2018 Final	Põhja-Tallinna JK Volta II (III W 2nd)	3–1	Tõrva JK (II S/W 12th)	Tallinn, Harjumaa
20:00	Huttunen 43', 83'; Ovsijenko 57'	Report	Külm 37' (pen.)	Stadium: Sõle jalgpallihall Attendance: 16; Referee: Kristjan-Eric Lääne

11. November 2018 Final	Tõrva JK (II S/W 12th)	1–4	Põhja-Tallinna JK Volta II (III W 2nd)	Karksi-Nuia, Viljandimaa
14:00	Orlo 71'	Report	Huttunen 43'; Harkmann 69' (pen.); Põld 74'; Kivi 90+1'	Stadium: Karksi-Nuia Gümnaasiumi staadion Attendance: 14; Referee: Andrus Õun
