= Türi Ganvix JK =

Estonian football club

- Full name: Türi Ganvix jalgpalliklubi
- Founded: 2004; 21 years ago
- Ground: Türi linnastaadion
- Manager: Kristo Kiik
- League: II Liiga S/W
- 2017: II Liiga S/W, 5th
- Website: www.ganvix.ee
Home colours	Away colours

Türi Ganvix JK is an Estonian football club based in Türi. Founded in 2004, they currently play in the III liiga, third of Estonian football. Türi linnastaadion is their home stadium. They also have a reserve team, SK Tääksi, which plays in III Liiga.

== Players ==
=== Current squad ===
As of 24 August 2013.

Note: Flags indicate national team as defined under FIFA eligibility rules; some limited exceptions apply. Players may hold more than one non-FIFA nationality.

No.	Pos.	Nation	Player
13	DF	EST	Arsen Abeljan
33	DF	EST	Janar Adler
10	DF	EST	Rain Aolaid
9	FW	EST	Ergo Eelmäe
1	GK	EST	Marti Ilves
8	MF	EST	Rauno Kald
6	DF	EST	Raido Kangur
4	MF	EST	Jüri Karus
27	MF	EST	Ken-Kaspar Kerner
11	FW	EST	Kristo Kiik
19	MF	EST	Veiko Koks
17		EST	Herman Koppel
20	MF	EST	Asko Krais
12	DF	EST	Kristjan Kärt
1		EST	Madis Leht

No.	Pos.	Nation	Player
5	DF	EST	Timmu Luts
21		EST	Mikk Maimann
24	MF	EST	Martin Murumaa
30		EST	Sander Paalpere
14	MF	EST	Peteri Pajumets
27	MF	EST	Hindrik Pihl
29	MF	EST	Tarvo Piip
18	MF	EST	Rasmus Provornikov
40	MF	EST	Martin Saar
23	MF	EST	Aleksander Saharov
3	MF	EST	Karlis Seire
2	DF	EST	Roman Zarovski
16	MF	EST	Robert Tupits
7		EST	Tauri Unt
25	DF	EST	Marko Vellamäe

== Statistics ==
=== League and Cup ===
Season	Division	Pos	Teams	Pld	W	D	L	GF	GA	GD	Pts	Top Goalscorer	Estonian Cup
2005	V Liiga S/W	2	9	16	11	2	3	56	16	+40	35	Ergo Eelmäe (29)	
2006	IV Liiga S	1	12	22	16	1	5	82	25	+47	49	Ergo Eelmäe (44)	
2007	III Liiga S	1	12	22	19	0	3	78	21	+57	57	Ergo Eelmäe (30)	
2008	II Liiga S/W	9	14	26	10	4	12	69	50	+19	34	Ergo Eelmäe (19)	Quarter-final
2009	II Liiga S/W	3	14	26	12	7	7	70	39	+31	43	Ergo Eelmäe (22)	Quarter-final
2010	II Liiga S/W	11	14	26	7	10	9	66	61	+5	31	Ergo Eelmäe (18)	Fourth round
2011	II Liiga S/W	10	14	26	10	1	5	45	86	−41	31	Ergo Eelmäe (11)	Third round
2012	II Liiga S/W	12	14	26	7	0	19	52	122	−70	21	Ergo Eelmäe (10)	Quarter-final
2013	II Liiga S/W	3	14	26	15	3	8	57	60	−3	48	Karel Seire (8)	First round
2014	II Liiga N/E	5	14	26	13	1	12	78	67	+11	40	Karel Seire (24)	Third round
2015	II Liiga S/W	2	14	26	17	2	7	72	37	+35	53	Karel Seire (28)	Second round
2016	II Liiga S/W	10	14	26	8	5	13	47	59	−12	29	Kristo Kiik (13)	Second round
2017	II Liiga S/W	5	14	26	12	4	10	48	50	−2	40	Kristo Kiik (17)	Third round
2018	II Liiga S/W	10	14	26	9	3	14	40	72	−32	30	Kristo Kiik (9)	–
