= Jõgeva SK Noorus-96 =

Estonian football club

Jõgeva SK Noorus 96
- Full name: Jõgeva Spordiklubi Noorus 96
- Founded: 20.08.1996
- Ground: Jõgeva Aleviku Stadium, Jõgeva
- Manager: Igor Orlov
- League: II Liiga
- 2018: II Liiga N/E, 4th
Home colours	Away colours

Jõgeva SK Noorus is a football club based in Jõgeva, Estonia.

It has a reserve team, Vaimastvere SK Illi, that currently plays in the III Liiga.

== Players ==
=== Current squad ===
As of 28 July 2016.

Note: Flags indicate national team as defined under FIFA eligibility rules; some limited exceptions apply. Players may hold more than one non-FIFA nationality.

No.	Pos.	Nation	Player
1	GK	(Estonia) EST	Rauno Pristakva
3	MF	(Estonia) EST	Keio Kanna
5	MF	(Estonia) EST	Hendrik Unt
6	DF	(Estonia) EST	Kevin Liblik
6	MF	(Estonia) EST	Mario Tikerberi
7	MF	(Estonia) EST	Nikolai Roop
8	MF	(Estonia) EST	Kaarel Põldmaa
9	FW	(Estonia) EST	Asso Nettan
10	FW	(Estonia) EST	Tauno Anvelt
11	MF	(Estonia) EST	Priit Jõeäär
12	DF	(Estonia) EST	Eigo Loorius
13	MF	(Estonia) EST	Eduard Leppmets
15	DF	(Estonia) EST	Vladimir Ingver
16	MF	(Estonia) EST	Kaido Ingver

No.	Pos.	Nation	Player
17	MF	(Estonia) EST	Kristjan Kuldmägi
20	MF	(Estonia) EST	Reio Praats
23	MF	(Estonia) EST	Jaanus Listra
24	MF	(Estonia) EST	Rauno Pikver
77	MF	(Estonia) EST	Andro Lepp
88	MF	(Estonia) EST	Mihkel Kukk
91	GK	(Estonia) EST	Rainer Kalde
95	DF	(Estonia) EST	Jürgen Hiljurand
97	GK	(Estonia) EST	Timo Limberg
—	FW	(Estonia) EST	Sten Juhanson
—	FW	(Estonia) EST	Mikk Kesküla
—	DF	(Estonia) EST	Mikk Lõhmus
—	MF	(Estonia) EST	Marcus Mardimäe
—	FW	(Estonia) EST	Raul-Martin Sirkas

== Statistics ==
=== League and Cup ===
Season	Division	Pos	Teams	Pld	W	D	L	GF	GA	GD	Pts	Avg. Att.	Top Goalscorer	Estonian Cup	Notes
2001	IV liiga S	4	11	20	13	1	6	91	45	+46	40		Raul Kivi (24)		as Jõgeva SK Tähe
2002	IV liiga S	2	10	18	11	5	2	47	30	+17	38		Raul Kivi (13)		as Jõgeva SK Tähe
2003	III liiga S	10	10	18	3	1	14	25	56	−31	10		Nikolai Roop (9)		as Jõgeva SK Tähe
2004	IV liiga S	6	10	18	8	2	8	58	51	+7	26		Nikolai Roop (15)		as Jõgeva SK Tähe
2005	IV liiga S	3	12	22	14	3	5	92	38	+54	48		Nikolai Roop (28)		as Jõgeva SK Tähe
2006	III liiga S	4	12	22	12	5	8	81	50	+31	41		Nikolai Roop (20)		as Jõgeva SK Tähe
2007	III liiga S	3	12	22	12	5	8	71	34	+37	41		Kristjan Kuldmägi and Mihkel Kukk (15)		as Jõgeva SK Tähe
2008	III liiga S	11	12	22	6	2	14	51	60	−9	20		Mairo Tikerberi (14)	Second round	as Jõgeva SK Noorus 96
2009	III liiga S	5	12	22	11	4	7	45	37	+8	37		Mairo Tikerberi (10)	Second round	as Jõgeva SK Noorus 96
2010	III liiga S	10	12	22	6	6	10	40	57	−17	24		Nikolai Roop (11)	Second round	as Jõgeva SK Noorus 96
2011	III liiga S	2	12	22	13	6	3	82	30	+52	45		Mairo Tikerberi (28)	Second round	as Jõgeva SK Noorus 96
2012	III liiga S	2	12	22	16	1	5	76	38	+38	49		Mairo Tikerberi (31)	Second round	as Jõgeva SK Noorus 96
2013	II liiga S/W	5	14	26	15	1	10	63	61	+2	46		Tauno Anvelt (21)	First round	as Jõgeva SK Noorus 96
2014	II liiga N/E	9	14	26	10	3	13	68	65	+3	33		Mairo Tikenberi (27)	Third round	as Jõgeva SK Noorus 96
2015	II liiga N/E	10	14	26	7	6	13	53	75	−22	27		Mairo Tikenberi (15)	Second round	as Jõgeva SK Noorus 96
2016	II liiga N/E	10	14	26	8	7	11	66	63	+3	31		Kaarel Põldma (23)	Second round	as Jõgeva SK Noorus 96
2017	II liiga N/E	7	14	26	14	2	10	64	53	+11	44		Kaarel Põldma (23)	Second round	as Jõgeva SK Noorus 96
2018	II liiga N/E	4	14	26	13	5	8	62	49	+13	44	25	Stenver Kleimann-Leimann (23)	Fourth round	as Jõgeva SK Noorus 96
2019	II liiga N/E	10	14	26	8	3	15	27	57	–30	27	21	Margo Parkala (6)	First round	as Jõgeva SK Noorus 96
2020	II liiga N/E	8	14	26	10	3	13	49	65	–16	33	28	Margo Parkala (11)	Second round	as Jõgeva SK Noorus 96
