= 2018–19 Estonian Cup =

Estonian football competition

Tournament details
- Country: Estonia
- Teams: 91

Final positions
- Champions: Narva Trans
- Runners-up: Nõmme Kalju

Tournament statistics
- Matches played: 90
- Goals scored: 551 (6.12 per match)

The 2018–19 Estonian Cup was the 29th season of the Estonian main domestic football knockout tournament. Narva Trans won their second title after defeating Nõmme Kalju in the final and qualified for the first qualifying round of the UEFA Europa League.

== First round (1/64) ==
The draw was made by Estonian Football Association on 19 May 2018.

- League level of the club in the brackets.
- Rahvaliiga RL (people's league) is a league organized by Estonian Football Association, but not part of the main league system.

Home team	Score	Away team
5 June
Põhja-Sakala (5)	1–3	Tallinna JK Legion (3)
12 June
FC Mulgi (RL)	1–2	Ambla Vallameeskond (5)
Maardu United II (6)	21–2	JK Mauruse Saurused (RL)
14 June
FC Sillamäe (5)	1–1 (3–1 p)	Anija JK (5)
Rumori Calcio Tallinn (5)	3–0	Raplamaa JK (4)
JK Tallinna Kalev III (4)	3–3 (3–5 p)	Läänemaa JK (4)
16 June
Paide Linnameeskond III (4)	6–1	Kohila Püsivus (5)
Valga FC Warrior (5)	5–1	FC Viking (RL)
Tallinna FC Ararat TTÜ (3)	3–3 (1–4 p)	Maarjamäe FC Igiliikur (6)
17 June
SK Imavere (5)	4–3	Rasmus Värki Jalgpallikool (RL)
Koeru JK (5)	3–2	Viimsi Lõvid (RL)
Vaimastvere SK Illi (6)	8–0	JK Raudteetöölised (RL)
Viimsi JK II (5)	3–0	Pärnu JK Poseidon II (4)
SK Kadrina (5)	3–0	FCP Pärnu (RL)
Tallinna FC Olympic Olybet (6)	0–16	Tallinna FC Flora (1)
Maardu Linnameeskond (2)	3–0	Viljandi JK Tulevik (1)
Paide Linnameeskond U21 (3)	0–3	JK Tabasalu (4)
Põhja-Tallinna JK Volta (4)	0–3	Tartu JK Tammeka (1)
JK Loo (5)	1–2	Pärnu JK Vaprus (1)
Tõrva JK (4)	1–3	Kohtla-Järve JK Järve (3)
FC Npm Silmet (RL)	w/o	FC Tallinn (6)
FC Kuressaare (1)	22–0	Põlva FC Lootos (5)
Märjamaa Kompanii (6)	10–0	FC Tallinna Wolves (RL)
Viljandi JK Tulevik II (4)	4–3	FC Jõgeva Wolves (5)
21 June
FC Puhkus Mehhikos (RL)	2–9	Põhja-Tallinna JK Volta II (5)
Tallinna FC TransferWise (5)	2–3	Kohtla-Nõmme (RL)
22 June
Tallinna FC Soccernet (6)	0–12	FCI Levadia Tallinn (1)

=== Byes ===
These teams were not drawn and secured a place in the second round without playing:

- Meistriliiga (Level 1): JK Narva Trans, Nõmme Kalju FC, JK Tallinna Kalev, Paide Linnameeskond
- Esiliiga (2): Rakvere JK Tarvas, FC Flora U21, Tartu FC Santos, FC Elva, Tartu JK Welco
- Esiliiga B (3): FC Flora U19, FC Nõmme United
- II Liiga (4): Raasiku FC Joker, JK Sillamäe Kalev, Tallinna JK Piraaja, Jõgeva SK Noorus-96, Maardu United, Viimsi JK, FC Otepää, Pärnu JK Poseidon, Kohtla-Järve JK Järve II
- III Liiga (5): Tallinna FC Zapoos, FC Zenit Tallinn, Nõmme Kalju FC III, Tallinna FC Eston Villa, FC Vastseliina, Tartu FC Helios, Tallinna JK Augur, FC Järva-Jaani, FC Kose, JK Kernu Kadakas
- IV Liiga (6): Tallinna Depoo, Tallinna JK Jalgpallihaigla, FC Lelle, Tartu FC Helios II, FC Äksi Wolves
- Rahvaliiga (RL): FC Teleios, FC Maksatransport

== Second round (1/32) ==
The draw for the second round was made on 19 June 2018.

Home team	Score	Away team
28 June
FC Sillamäe (5)	0–16	Nõmme Kalju FC (1)
29 June
SK Imavere (5)	0–10	JK Narva Trans (1)
4 July
Tartu FC Helios (5)	0–13	FC Flora (1)
7 July
FCI Levadia Tallinn (1)	4–1	FC Nõmme United (3)
8 July
Tallinna JK Jalgpallihaigla (6)	0–7	Valga FC Warrior (5)
13 July
Tallinna JK Augur (5)	1–15	Paide Linnameeskond (1)
16 July
Tartu JK Welco (2)	1–0	FC Flora U19 (3)
FC Teleios (RL)	4–1	Kohtla-Nõmme (RL)
17 July
JK Sillamäe Kalev (4)	4–2	Viljandi JK Tulevik II (4)
Rumori Calcio Tallinn (5)	1–8	JK Tallinna Kalev (1)
18 July
Kohtla-Järve JK Järve (3)	0–2	Tartu JK Tammeka (1)
FC Järva-Jaani (5)	3–1	Tallinna FC Zapoos (5)
SK Kadrina (5)	2–0	Tallinna Depoo (6)
Ambla Vallameeskond (5)	1–6	Viimsi JK (4)
Tallinna FC Eston Villa (5)	0–4	FC Elva (2)
Läänemaa JK (4)	6–0	Nõmme Kalju FC III (5)
JK Tabasalu (4)	6–0	FC Lelle (6)
FC Äksi Wolves (6)	w/o	Maardu United (4)
Maardu Linnameeskond (2)	5–1	Põhja-Tallinna JK Volta II (5)
FC Flora U21 (2)	10–0	Maardu United II (6)
FC Vastseliina (5)	2–5	Tartu FC Santos (2)
FC Kose (5)	w/o	Koeru JK (5)
Viimsi JK II (5)	3–2	FC Maksatransport (RL)
Märjamaa Kompanii (6)	2–2 (a.e.t.) (2–3 p)	FC Zenit Tallinn (5)
FC Npm Silmet (RL)	1–2	Pärnu JK Vaprus (1)
Rakvere JK Tarvas (2)	0–3	Tallinna JK Legion (3)
Jõgeva SK Noorus-96 (4)	7–3	FC Otepää (4)
19 July
Maarjamäe FC Igiliikur (6)	1–2	Kohtla-Järve JK Järve II (4)
24 July
Tallinna JK Piraaja (4)	7–0	Tartu FC Helios II (6)
25 July
Paide Linnameeskond III (4)	10–4	JK Kernu Kadakas (5)
Raasiku FC Joker (4)	4–5	Pärnu JK Poseidon (4)
FC Kuressaare (1)	15–0	Vaimastvere SK Illi (6)

== Third round (1/16) ==
The draw for the third round was made on 19 July 2018.

Home team	Score	Away team
8 August
JK Tallinna Kalev (1)	3–0	Tartu FC Santos (2)
14 August
Tartu JK Tammeka (1)	1–0	FC Flora U21 (2)
Viimsi JK (4)	2–3	FC Elva (2)
Paide Linnameeskond (1)	2–1	Paide Linnameeskond III (4)
FC Kuressaare (1)	2–3	Nõmme Kalju FC (1)
16 August
FC Flora (1)	13–0	Valga FC Warrior (5)
Tallinna JK Legion (3)	3–0	Pärnu JK Vaprus (1)
Läänemaa JK (4)	14–1	FC Teleios (RL)
21 August
FC Järva-Jaani (5)	5–0	FC Äksi Wolves (6)
SK Kadrina (5)	0–7	JK Narva Trans (1)
Maardu Linnameeskond (2)	4–0	JK Sillamäe Kalev (4)
22 August
Viimsi JK II (5)	2–2 (a.e.t.) (3–2 p)	Kohtla-Järve JK Järve II (4)
FC Zenit Tallinn (5)	4–2	FC Kose (5)
Tartu JK Welco (2)	0–5	FCI Levadia Tallinn (1)
Pärnu JK Poseidon (4)	0–3	JK Tabasalu (4)
23 August
Tallinna JK Piraaja (4)	3–4	Jõgeva SK Noorus-96 (4)

== Fourth round (1/8) ==
The draw for the fourth round was made on 24 August 2018.

Home team	Score	Away team
5 September
Maardu Linnameeskond (2)	4–0	Läänemaa JK (4)
6 September
FC Järva-Jaani (5)	0–6	Tartu JK Tammeka (1)
25 September
FCI Levadia Tallinn (1)	2–1	FC Flora (1)
JK Narva Trans (1)	8–0	Jõgeva SK Noorus-96 (4)
Paide Linnameeskond (1)	2–1	Tallinna JK Legion (3)
JK Tabasalu (4)	6–1	FC Zenit Tallinn (5)
26 September
Nõmme Kalju FC (1)	3–0 (a.e.t.)	JK Tallinna Kalev (1)
Viimsi JK II (5)	0–3	FC Elva (2)

== Quarter-finals ==
The draw for the fourth round was made on 2 March 2019. Maardu Linnameeskond and JK Tabasalu advanced a league level between 2018 and 2019 league seasons.

23 April 2019	Nõmme Kalju FC (1)	2–1 (a.e.t.)	Tartu JK Tammeka (1)	Tallinn
19:00 (UTC+3)	Paur 104'; Núñez 119'	Report	Tekko 111'	Stadium: Hiiu Stadium; Referee: Juri Frischer

23 April 2019	JK Tabasalu (3)	1–5	FC Elva (2)	Tabasalu
19:00 (UTC+3)	Lõppe 25'	Report	Thomson 3', 35'; Maidla 65'; Kütt 74'; Tinn 84'	Stadium: Tabasalu Arena; Referee: Mart Martin

24 April 2019	JK Narva Trans (1)	2–0	Maardu Linnameeskond (1)	Narva
19:00 (UTC+3)	Kasparavičius 56'; Poliakov 76'	Report		Stadium: Narva Kalev-Fama Stadium; Referee: Andrei Karhu

24 April 2019	Paide Linnameeskond (1)	1–4 (a.e.t.)	FCI Levadia Tallinn (1)	Paide
19:00 (UTC+3)	Kase 25'	Report	Gando 86', 113'; Morelli 93'; Roosnupp 112'	Stadium: Paide kunstmuruväljak Referee: Joonas Jaanovits

== Semi-finals ==
The draw was made on 25 April 2019.

7 May 2019	JK Narva Trans (1)	5–0	FC Elva (2)	Narva
18:00 (UTC+3)	Zakarliuka 44'; Kasparavicius 51'; Mihhailov 63'; Saliste 82'; Beneta 90'	Report		Stadium: Narva Kalev-Fama Stadium; Referee: Kristo Külljastinen

8 May 2019	Nõmme Kalju FC (1)	3–2 (a.e.t.)	FCI Levadia Tallinn (1)	Tallinn
18:00 (UTC+3)	Tjapkin 26'; Klein 90+2'; Liliu 108'	Report	Kaljumäe 21'; Podholjuzin 70'	Stadium: Hiiu Stadium; Referee: Juri Frischer

== Final ==
Final was played on 25 May 2019 at A. Le Coq Arena.

25 May 2019	JK Narva Trans (1)	2–1 (a.e.t.)	Nõmme Kalju FC (1)	Tallinn
16:00 (UTC+3)	Zakarlyuka 44' (pen.); Plotnikov 93'	Report	32' Liliu	Stadium: A. Le Coq Arena; Attendance: 1,004; Referee: Grigori Ošomkov

== See also ==
- 2018 Meistriliiga
- 2018 Esiliiga
- 2018 Esiliiga B
