= Julius Kasparavičius =

Lithuanian footballer (born 1995)

Personal information
- Date of birth: 3 April 1995 (age 31)
- Place of birth: Lithuania
- Height: 1.80 m (5 ft 11 in)
- Position: Striker

Team information
- Current team: Dobrudzha Dobrich

Youth career
- 2000–2007: Šilutė
- 2007–2011: West Ham
- 2011-2012: FAB Academy

Senior career*
Years	Team	Apps	(Gls)
2013	Šilutė		
2014–2015	Atlantas	5	(0)
2015	Palanga		
2017	Šilutė		
2018	Sūduva	17	(3)
2019	Narva Trans	29	(5)
2020	Banga	14	(2)
2021	Nevėžis	32	(4)
2022	Cherno More	1	(1)
2022–2024	Offanenghese		
2024–	Dobrudzha Dobrich	0	(0)

International career^{‡}
2019	Lithuania	0	(0)
- * Club domestic league appearances and goals as of 29 February 2024 (UTC) ‡ National team caps and goals as of 29 February 2024 (UTC)

Julius Kasparavičius (born 3 April 1995) is a Lithuanian footballer who plays as a striker for Vtora liga club Dobrudzha Dobrich.

== Career ==
As a youth player, Kasparavičius joined the youth academy of English Premier League side West Ham. He started his career with Šilutė in the Lithuanian second tier. In 2014, Kasparavičius signed for Lithuanian top flight club Atlantas. In 2015, he signed for Palanga in the Lithuanian second tier. Before the 2018 season, he signed for Lithuanian top flight team Sūduva, helping them win the league. Before the 2019 season, Kasparavičius signed for Narva Trans in Estonia, helping them win the 2018–19 Estonian Cup.

Before the 2020 season, he signed for Lithuanian outfit Banga. Before the second half of 2021–22, he signed for Cherno More in the Bulgarian top flight. On 20 February 2022, Kasparavičius debuted for Cherno More during a 1–2 loss to Ludogorets, scoring his team's goal. Due to injury struggles this turned out to be his only official appearance in a Cherno More shirt and he left the team by mutual consent in May 2022.

On 3 September 2022 he joined Italian side Offanenghese as a free agents. Then he joined FC Dobrudzha Dobrich.
