= Põhja-Tallinna JK Volta =

Estonian football club

- Founded: 2016; 9 years ago
- Ground: Sõle jalgpallihall
- Capacity: 500
- Chairman: Raimo Nõu
- Manager: Tarmo Rüütli
- League: III liiga
- 2022: II liiga East 8th
- Website: http://jkvolta.ee/
Home colours	Away colours

Põhja-Tallinna JK Volta is an Estonian football club based in Tallinn. Founded in 2016, they currently play in the Esiliiga B, the third tier of Estonian football. They also have two reserve teams - Põhja-Tallinna JK Volta II (II Liiga) and Põhja-Tallinna JK Volta III (III Liiga). They started in III liiga 2017, which they won on their first try. The following year the club triumphed in the fourth league and got promoted to Esiliiga B for the first time.

== Players ==
=== Current squad ===
As of 7 May 2019.

Note: Flags indicate national team as defined under FIFA eligibility rules; some limited exceptions apply. Players may hold more than one non-FIFA nationality.

No.	Pos.	Nation	Player
2	DF	(Estonia) EST	Karl Karimõisa
4	DF	(Estonia) EST	Teet Kallaste
5	DF	(Estonia) EST	Silver Räämet
6	DF	(Estonia) EST	Martin Nurmsaar
7	FW	(Estonia) EST	Kevin Lutsokert
8	MF	(Estonia) EST	Kaarel Kaarlimäe
9	FW	(Estonia) EST	Kaarel Põldma
11	MF	(Estonia) EST	Henry Niinlaub
12	DF	(Estonia) EST	Karlis Jänes
14	DF	(Estonia) EST	Marten Mütt
15	MF	(Estonia) EST	Dmitri Vassilenko
17	FW	(Nigeria) NGA	Arome Julius Onogu
18	FW	(Estonia) EST	Jarmo Ahjupera

No.	Pos.	Nation	Player
19	MF	(Russia) RUS	Evgeny Bnatov
20	FW	(Nigeria) NGA	Princewill Ani
21	MF	(Estonia) EST	Alen Stepanjan
23	FW	(Estonia) EST	Taavi Laurits
24	DF	(Estonia) EST	Egert Urva
27	MF	(Estonia) EST	Lauri Välja
30	DF	(Estonia) EST	Kaur Kennet Karjane
38	FW	(Estonia) EST	Ian-Erik Valge
72	DF	(Estonia) EST	Andry-Reilo Kahr
80	GK	(Estonia) EST	Silver Saluste
81	GK	(Estonia) EST	Janno Hermanson
98	MF	(Estonia) EST	Joosep Raudsepp

== Club officials ==
=== Coaching staff ===
Position	Name
Head coach	(Estonia) Urmas Hepner
Physiotherapist	(Estonia) Toomas Rebane
Fitness coach	(Estonia) Vahur Kiis

== Stadium ==
The club's home ground is the 500-seat Sõle jalgpallihall, located in Põhja-Tallinn, Sõle 40. Stadium opened first in 2017.

== Statistics ==
=== League and Cup ===
Season	Division	Pos	Teams	Pld	W	D	L	GF	GA	GD	Pts	Top goalscorer	Estonian Cup
2017	III liiga N	1	12	22	20	1	1	116	23	+93	61	Ian-Erik Valge (39)	Fourth round
2018	II liiga N/E	1	14	26	18	3	5	63	22	+41	57	Princewill Ani (18)	First round
