= FCI Tallinn =

Estonian football club

- Full name: FC Infonet Tallinn
- Founded: 29 January 2002; 23 years ago
- Ground: Infonet Lasnamäe Stadium
- Capacity: 500
- Manager: Vjatšeslav Smirnov
- League: II liiga
- 2022: II liiga, 1st
- Website: http://www.fcinfonet.ee
Home colours	Away colours

FCI Tallinn (FC Infonet Tallinn) is an Estonian football club, based in Lasnamäe, Tallinn.

Formed in 2002, the club played in the Estonian top flight Meistriliiga from 2013 to 2017, and won the league in the 2016 season. In 2017, the club merged with Levadia, with the main team and first reserve disbanded, the second reserves, playing in the II Liiga, the fourth level, inherited the club's name.

== History ==
The club was founded in 2002. Before the 2011 season, the club merged with Esiliiga club FC Atletik. They finished the 2011 season in second place, but were beaten in the promotion play-offs by Kuressaare 1–5 on aggregate. Infonet won the 2012 Esiliiga season and were promoted to the top tier Meistriliiga. Infonet finished its first season in the Estonian top division with 6th place.

On 13 July 2015, Infonet beat amateur side Virtsu 36–0 in a 2015–16 Estonian Cup match, equalling Arbroath's 130-year-old record for the largest margin of victory.

Infonet made their European debut in the 2016–17 UEFA Europa League, but were defeated by Scottish Heart of Midlothian 3–6 on aggregate in the first qualifying round.

Infonet won their first Meistriliiga title in the 2016 season, amassing 80 points.

After the 2017 season, it was announced that the club would merge with Levadia and be automatically relegated to the II liiga.

== Stadium ==
The club's home ground was the Infonet Lasnamäe Stadium, also known as the Lasnamäe KJH Stadium. The stadium was built in 2003 and resurfaced in 2016. It has a capacity of 500. The team played their UEFA matches at A. Le Coq Arena.

== Personnel ==
=== Managerial history ===
Dates	Name
2011	(Estonia) Andrei Borissov
2011–2017	(Estonia) Aleksandr Puštov
2017	(Serbia) Aleksandar Rogić

== Honours ==
- Meistriliiga
  - Champions: 2016
- Esiliiga
  - Winners: 2012
- Estonian Cup
  - Winners: 2016–17
- Estonian Supercup
  - Winners: 2017

== Statistics ==
=== League and Cup ===
Season	Division	Pos	Pld	W	D	L	GF	GA	GD	Pts	Top goalscorer	Cup	Supercup
2011	Esiliiga	2	36	19	11	6	101	47	+54	68	(Estonia) Maksim Rõtškov (40)	Third round	
2012	Esiliiga	1	36	26	5	5	94	33	+61	83	(Ivory Coast) Manucho (31)	Third round	
2013	Meistriliiga	6	36	10	8	18	36	56	–20	38	(Ivory Coast) Manucho (6)	Fourth round	
2014	Meistriliiga	5	36	19	9	8	80	44	+36	66	(Ivory Coast) Manucho (30)	Semifinalist	
2015	Meistriliiga	4	36	17	11	8	50	32	+18	62	(Latvia) Vladislavs Kozlovs (12)	Fourth round	
2016	Meistriliiga	1	36	24	8	4	74	33	+41	80	(Estonia) Vladimir Voskoboinikov (12)	Third round	
2017	Meistriliiga	4	36	20	5	11	103	47	+56	65	(Estonia) Albert Prosa (27)	Winner	Winner
2018	II Liiga	2	26	18	3	5	71	29	+42	57	(Estonia) Aleksei Šved (16)	Quarterfinalist	

=== Europe ===
Season	Competition	Round	Opponent	Home	Away	Agg.
2016–17	UEFA Europa League	First qualifying round	(Scotland) Heart of Midlothian	2–4	1–2	3–6
2017–18	UEFA Champions League	First qualifying round	(Malta) Hibernians	0–2	0–1	0–3
