= Tartu Ülikool Fauna =

Estonian football club

- Full name: Mittetulundusühing Jalgpalliklubi Fauna (Non-profit Organization Football Club Fauna)
- Founded: 1998
- Manager: Laur Nurkse
- League: IV Liiga Lõuna
- 2012: IV liiga Lõuna, 7th
Home colours	Away colours

Tartu Ülikool Fauna is an Estonian football club based in Tartu. The club was founded in 1998; Fauna currently plays in the III liiga Lõuna division, the fourth tier of Estonian football.

== Current squad ==
As of 24 August 2013.

Note: Flags indicate national team as defined under FIFA eligibility rules; some limited exceptions apply. Players may hold more than one non-FIFA nationality.

No.	Pos.	Nation	Player
1	GK	EST	Priit Tiitson
17	GK	EST	Eduard Sing
2	DF	EST	Rasmus Mägi
6	DF	EST	Georg Pukk
8	DF	EST	Tanel Mehine
14	DF	EST	Kaarel Kaldvee
15	DF	EST	Jaak Unt
18	DF	EST	Valdur Tammets
20	DF	EST	Olari Pärn
24	DF	EST	Raimo Lust
32	DF	EST	Tarmo Tikk
47	DF	EST	Priit Teresk
4	MF	EST	Taavi Vaasma
5	MF	EST	Mihkel Kork
9	MF	EST	Silver Tilk

No.	Pos.	Nation	Player
12	MF	EST	Kaarel Piirimäe
13	MF	EST	Dmitri Rozgonjuk
21	MF	EST	Argo Petrovits
31	MF	EST	Tauri Tampuu
36	MF	EST	Martin Merisalu
40	MF	EST	Gert Voomets
99	MF	EST	Kaspar Huul
7	FW	EST	Eero Varendi
11	FW	EST	Meelis Kall
16	FW	EST	Andre Priisalu
30	FW	EST	Rene Treier
69	FW	EST	Timo Sujev
70	FW	EST	Laur Nurkse
98	FW	EST	Taavi Merisalu

== League history ==
Season	League	Pos	Pld	W	D	L	GF	GA	GD	Pts	Top Goalscorer	Manager
1999	5	3									Ken Viidebaum	
2000	5	4										
2001	4	1	18	4	0	4	44	24	20	42	Margus Jänes	Rait Rodi
2002	3	6	20	2	4	14	24	79	−51	10		Rait Rodi
2003	4	5	18	7	4	7	31	32	−1	25		Taavi Annus
2004	4	8										Taavi Annus
2005	4	2	22	15	2	5	56	26	30	47	Maksim Mitrofanov (18)	Siim Sarv & Eero Heinloo
2006	3	7	28	3	11	14	33	80	−47	20	Erki Kade (9)	Ken Viidebaum
2007	3	13	26	4	2	20	42	105	−63	14	Erki Kade (13)	Ken Viidebaum
2008	4	9	22	7	1	14	35	49	−14	22	Maksim Mitrofanov (9)	Jaanus Vislapuu
2009	4	9	22	7	4	11	33	53	−20	25	Maksim Mitrofanov (16)	Eero Heinloo
2010	4	11	22	5	2	15	36	56	−20	17		
2011	4	12	22	3	2	17	27	62	−35	11	Maksim Mitrofanov (8)	Kait-Kaarel Vaino
2012	5											Imre Sarv
2013	4											Laur Nurkse
2014	4											Laur Nurkse
