= SK Imavere =

Estonian football club

- Full name: Spordiklubi Imavere
- Founded: 2012; 13 years ago
- Ground: Imavere Stadium
- League: III Liiga South
- 2022: III liiga (South), 4th
Home colours	Away colours

SK Imavere is a football club, based in Imavere, Estonia.

The club also has a reserve team, JK Väätsa Vald, which plays in the III Liiga.

== Statistics ==
=== League and Cup ===
Season	Division	Pos	Pld	W	D	L	GF	GA	GD	Pts	Top goalscorer	Cup	Notes
2012	IV liiga S	5	22	12	5	5	85	43	+42	41	Alar Arula (28)	-	as SK Imavere Forss
2013	IV liiga S	1	20	17	1	2	99	21	+78	52	Alar Arula (31)	Second round	as SK Imavere Forss
2014	III liiga S	2	22	14	4	4	80	41	+39	46	Alar Arula (24)	Second round	as SK Imavere Forss
2015	II liiga W/S	7	26	11	4	11	59	68	−9	37	Alar Arula (18)	Second round	as SK Imavere Forss
2016	II liiga W/S	9	26	9	3	14	70	77	−7	30	Alar Arula (28)	Second round	as SK Imavere Forss
2017	II liiga W/S	11	26	9	2	15	42	83	−41	29	Alar Arula (14)	First round	as SK Imavere
2018	III liiga S	2	22	14	1	7	54	44	+10	43	Alar Arula (15)	Second round	as SK Imavere
