= Loo, Estonia =

Borough in Estonia

Loo
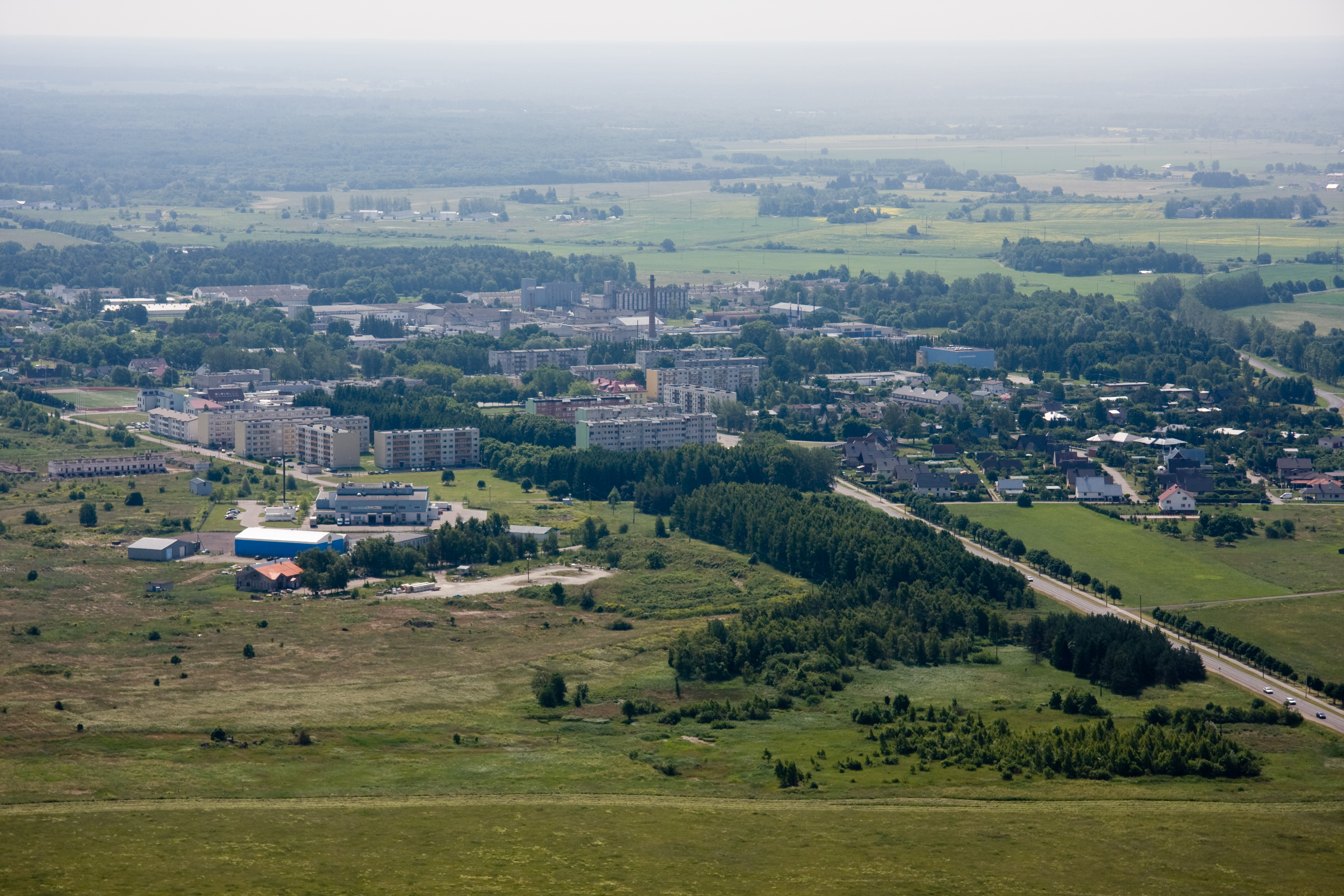
- Loo

- Location within Estonia
- Coordinates: 59°26′02″N 24°56′48″E
- Country: Estonia
- County: Harju County

Population (2011 Census)
  - Total: 2,093
- Time zone: UTC+2 (EET)

Loo is a small borough (alevik) in Jõelähtme Parish, Harju County in northern Estonia. At the 2011 Census, the settlement's population was 2,093.
