= Kristo Tohver =

Estonian football referee

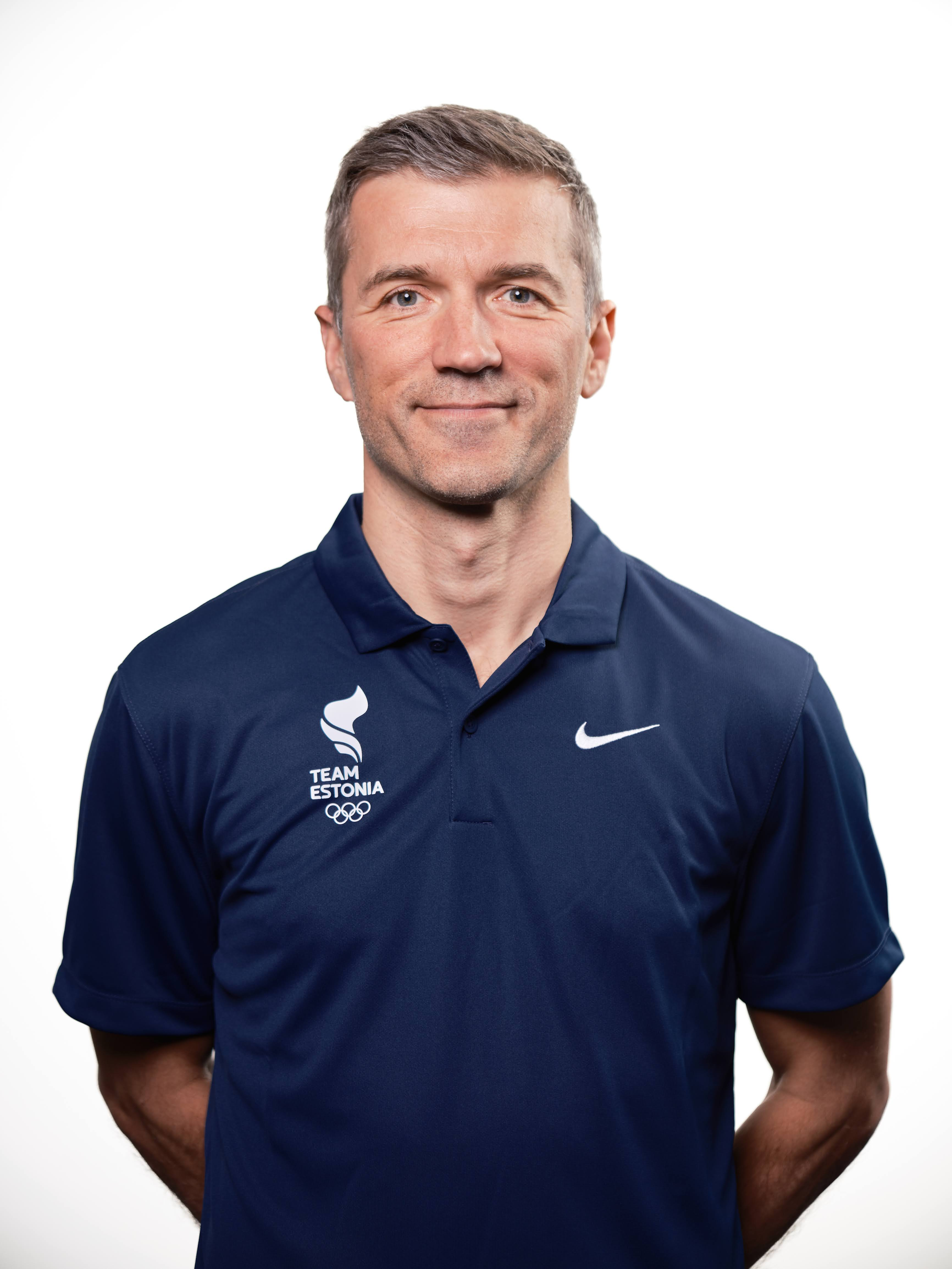
- Kristo Tohver (2025)
- Full name: Kristo Tohver
- Born: 11 June 1981 (age 45); Tartu, then part of Estonian SSR, Soviet Union

Domestic
Years	League	Role

International
Years	League	Role
2010–	FIFA listed	Referee

Kristo Tohver (born 11 June 1981) is an Estonian international referee who refereed at 2014 FIFA World Cup qualifiers.

Tohver has also served as a referee at the 2012-13 UEFA Europa League, the 2011 UEFA European Under-17 Football Championship, and qualifiers for other junior-level UEFA competitions, including the 2013 UEFA Under-21 championship.
