= JK Jalgpallihaigla =

Estonian football club

- Full name: JK Jalgpallihaigla Tallinn
- Founded: 1994
- Ground: Männiku kunstmuruväljak, Tallinn
- Chairman: -
- Manager: Tarmo Linnamägi
- League: IV liiga A tasand
- 2021: IV liiga A, 3rd
Home colours	Away colours

JK Jalgpallihaigla is an Estonian football club based in Tallinn and was founded in 1994. They play in the IV liiga A tasand, sixth-highest division in the Estonian football and Männiku kunstmuruväljak is their home stadium.

The history of the team, which consists of Estonian football fans, goes back to the year 1994, when a football team called Flora Fänn was created. After that this team has been existing under several names, like JK Vana Villem and Infoabi 1188. In the beginning of 2004 the name was finally changed to JK Jalgpallihaigla.
