= Estonian Cup =

Association football cup competition in Estonia

- Founded: 1938; 88 years ago
- Region: Estonia
- Teams: various
- Qualifier for: UEFA Conference League
- Current champions: Flora (9th title)
- Most championships: Levadia (11 titles)
- Website: jalgpall.ee
- 2025–26 Estonian Cup

The Estonian Cup (Estonian: Eesti Karikas) is the national knockout competition in Estonian football. In 2012, the competition was unofficially rebranded as Evald Tipner's Cup. The winner will compete in the UEFA Conference League first qualifying round.

== Finals ==
Season	Winner (Titles)	Score	Runner-up
1938	Sport (1)	1–1 (a.e.t.)	TJK
1938	Sport (1)	2–1 (a.e.t.)	TJK
1939	TJK (1)	4–1	Kalev Tallinn
1992–93	Nikol (1)	0–0 (4–2 (p))	Norma
1993–94	Norma (1)	4–1	Narva Trans
1994–95	Flora (1) D	2–0	Lantana/Marlekor
1995–96	Tallinna Sadam (1)	2–0	Eesti Põlevkivi Jõhvi
1996–97	Tallinna Sadam (2)	3–2	Lantana
1997–98	Flora (2) D	3–2	Lantana
1998–99	Levadia Maardu (1)^{1} D	3–2	Viljandi Tulevik
1999–00	Levadia Maardu (2)^{1} D	2–0	Viljandi Tulevik
2000–01	Narva Trans (1)	1–0 (a.e.t.)	Flora
2001–02	Levadia Tallinn (1)^{1}	2–0	Levadia Maardu^{1}
2002–03	TVMK (1)	2–2 (4–1 (p))	Flora
2003–04	Levadia (3) D	3–0	TVMK
2004–05	Levadia (4)	1–0	TVMK
2005–06	TVMK (2)	1–0	Flora
2006–07	Levadia (5) D	3–0	Narva Trans
2007–08	Flora (3)	3–1	Maag Tammeka
2008–09	Flora (4)	0–0 (4–3 (p))	Nõmme Kalju
2009–10	Levadia (6)	3–0	Flora
2010–11	Flora (5) D	2–0	Narva Trans
2011–12	Levadia (7)	3–0	Narva Trans
2012–13	Flora (6)	3–1	Nõmme Kalju
2013–14	Levadia (8) D	4–0	Santos
2014–15	Nõmme Kalju (1)	2–0	Paide Linnameeskond
2015–16	Flora (7)	3–0 (a.e.t.)	Sillamäe Kalev
2016–17	FCI Tallinn (1)	2–0	Tartu Tammeka
2017–18	Levadia (9)	1–0	Flora
2018–19	Narva Trans (2)	2–1 (a.e.t.)	Nõmme Kalju
2019–20	Flora (8) D	2–1	Narva Trans
2020–21	Levadia (10) D	1–0	Flora
2021–22	Paide Linnameeskond (1)	1–0 (a.e.t.)	Nõmme Kalju
2022–23	Narva Trans (3)	2–1	Flora
2023–24	Levadia (11) D	4–2	Paide Linnameeskond
2024–25	Nõmme Kalju (2)	3–3 (4–1 (p))	Levadia
2025–26	Flora (9)	5–1	Paide Linnameeskond

^{1}Levadia were founded as FC Levadia Maardu. Until 2004 FC Levadia Tallinn were separate team owned by the steel company Levadia. In 2004 the clubs were merged FC Levadia Maardu were moved to Tallinn and became FC Levadia Tallinn, former FC Levadia Tallinn become their reserves as FC Levadia II Tallinn.

D – Winning team were also Estonian Champions in the same calendar year, winning The Double.

== Performance by club ==
Club	Wins	Runners-up
Levadia	11	2
Flora	9	7
Narva Trans	3	5
Nõmme Kalju	2	4
TVMK	2	2
Tallinna Sadam	2	-
Paide Linnameeskond	1	3
TJK	1	1
Norma	1	1
Sport	1	-
Nikol	1	-
Levadia II	1	-
FCI Tallinn	1	-
Lantana	-	3
Viljandi Tulevik	-	2
Tammeka	-	2
Eesti Põlevkivi Jõhvi	-	1
Tallinna Kalev	-	1
Santos	-	1
Sillamäe Kalev	-	1

== Unofficial finals ==
The competition was not officially competed for between 1940 and 1991 due to first Soviet occupation, German occupation and second Soviet occupation.

Season	Winner	Runner-up	Score
1940	TJK	Esta Tallinn	4–1
1942	Sport Tallinn	Kalev Pärnu	3–0
1943	PSR Tartu	Kalev Tallinn	1–0
