= IV liiga =

Estonian football/soccer league season for the sixth and lowest division

- Country: Estonia
- Confederation: UEFA
- Level on pyramid: 6
- Promotion to: III liiga
- Relegation to: —
- Domestic cup(s): Estonian Cup; Estonian Small Cup

IV liiga is the sixth and lowest football league organised by the Estonian Football Association. Its season starts in April and lasts until October.

== IV liiga North/East 2018 ==
IV Liiga North/East
- Number of clubs: 8
- Current champions: Tallinna Depoo (2017)

- Tallinna Depoo
- Pakri SK Alexela
- Maardu United II
- Tallinna JK Piraaja II
- Põhja-Tallinna JK Volta III
- Maarjamäe FC Igiliikur
- Tallinna FC Soccernet
- FC Tallinn

== IV liiga South 2018 ==
IV Liiga South
- Number of clubs: 7
- Current champions: Valga FC Warrior (2017)

- FC Äksi Wolves
- Vaimastvere SK Illi
- Põhja-Sakala II
- Tartu JK Tammeka IV
- Tartu FC Loomaaed
- Tartu JK Welco X
- Tartu FC Helios II

== IV liiga North/West 2018 ==
IV Liiga North/West
- Number of clubs: 7
- Current champions: Haapsalu JK (2017)

- FC Lelle
- Paide United
- Märjamaa Kompanii
- Kristiine JK
- Tallinna JK Jalgpallihaigla
- Tallinna FC Olympic Olybet
- FC Toompea
- Tallinna FC Reaal

== IV liiga finals ==
=== IV Liiga Finals 2012 ===
14. October 2012 Semi-Final	Läänemaa JK	1:4	FC Pubi Trehv	Haapsalu, Estonia
14:00	Mark Kolosov 18'	(Report)	Sander Kilk 14'; Kristjan Trink 45'; Joel Lobjakas 61', 66'	Stadium: Haapsalu Stadium; Attendance: 72; Referee: Tomi Rahula

14. October 2012 Semi-Final	Tallinna FC Levadia III	1:2	Trummi SK	Tallinn, Estonia
17:00	Rasmus Radila 36'	(Report)	Rafig Adigazalov 21'; Siim Malva 81'	Stadium: Maarjamäe Stadium; Attendance: 12; Referee: Kert Küttis

20. October 2012 Final	FC Pubi Trehv	2:1	Trummi SK	Tartu, Estonia
17:00	Sander Kilk 68', 90+2'	(Report)	Kristjan Lainjärv 63'	Stadium: Tamme Stadium; Attendance: 70; Referee: Maikel Mikson

=== IV Liiga Finals 2013 ===
20. October 2013 Semi-Final	SK Imavere Forss	5:0	JK Pärnu-Jaagupi	Imavere, Estonia
15:00	Alar Arula 11'; Siim Imsi 28'; Tauri Imsi 32'; Risto Liiv 48', 52'	(Report)		Stadium: Imavere Stadium; Attendance: 50; Referee: Rauno Kald

20. October 2013 Semi-Final	Nõmme JK Kalju III	3:1 (a.e.t.)	Viimsi FC Igiliikur	Tallinn, Estonia
16:30	Margus Reinaru 49', 98'; Getulio Aurelio Fredo 105' (pen.)	(Report)	Anti Luik 88'	Stadium: Hiiu Stadium; Attendance: 20; Referee: Risto Eelmaa

27. October 2013 Final	SK Imavere Forss	1:0	Nõmme JK Kalju III	Imavere, Estonia
13:00	Risto Liiv 89'	(Report)		Stadium: Imavere Stadium; Attendance: 75; Referee: Danel Udu

=== IV Liiga Finals 2014 ===
19. October 2014 Semi-Final	Pärnu JK	5:0	FCF Tallinna Ülikool II	Pärnu, Estonia
13:00	Jako Kanter 33'; Mihhail Kazak 63'; Kristian Lenk 75'; Jevgeni Novkikov 82', 86'	(Report)		Stadium: Pärnu kunstmurustaadion Attendance: 18; Referee: Jagnar Jakobson

19. October 2014 Semi-Final	JK Narva Trans II	1:3	Pirita JK Reliikvia	Narva, Estonia
14:00	Vadim Mihhailov 59'	(Report)	Rainer Rohtla 64', 84'; Artur Kummer 77'	Stadium: Narva FAMA Stadium; Attendance: 5 Referee: Roman Treial

8. November 2014 Final	Pärnu JK	2:1 (a.e.t.)	Pirita JK Reliikvia	Pärnu, Estonia
11:00	Magnus Villota 82'; Jako Kanter 110'	(Report)	Villu Varjas 69'	Stadium: Pärnu kunstmurustaadion Attendance: 68; Referee: Risto Eelmaa

=== IV Liiga Finals 2015 ===
18. October 2015 Semi-Final	Pärnu JK Poseidon	2:3	FC Tarvastu	Pärnu, Estonia
14:00	Lauri Lilleste 34'; Joonas Einfeldt 70'	(Report)	Rauno Meister 31', 85'; Ants Palumaa 67'	Stadium: Pärnu kunstmurustaadion Attendance: 29; Referee: Joonas Jaanovits

Semi-Final	Tallinna FC Eston Villa	+:-	Tallinna FC Infonet III

25. Oktoober 2015 Final	Tallinna FC Eston Villa	1:5	FC Tarvastu	Tallinn, Estonia
13:00	Daniel Harold Field 31'	(Report)	Rauno Meister 30'; Tairo Orav 53'; Priit Pärnpuu 62'; Raivar Vaher 76' (o.g.); Genri Pähnapuu 78'	Stadium: Wismari Stadium; Attendance: 157; Referee: Rauno Kald

=== IV Liiga Finals 2016 ===
16. October 2016 Semi-Final	Trummi SK Kohila	+:-	Tartu JK Tammeka U19	Kohila, Estonia
13:00		(Report)		Stadium: Kohila staadion

29. October 2016 Final	Trummi SK Kohila	0:2	Raasiku FC Joker II	Tallinn, Estonia
18:00		(Report)	Markko Kudu 77'; Siim Urva 83'	Stadium: Sportland Arena; Attendance: 25; Referee: Viljar Pennert

=== IV Liiga Finals 2017 ===
14. October 2017 Final	Valga FC Warrior	0:6	Haapsalu JK	Valga, Estonia
14:00		(Report)	Aleksandr Vassiljev 12', 34', 55'; Dmitri Andrejev 40', 58', 71'	Stadium: Valga Kungla kunstmurustaadion Attendance: 46; Referee: Tiit Pruuli
