= Vladislav Kreida =

Estonian footballer (born 1999)

Personal information
- Date of birth: 25 September 1999 (age 27)
- Place of birth: Tallinn, Estonia
- Height: 1.79 m (5 ft 10 in)
- Position: Midfielder

Team information
- Current team: Flora
- Number: 32

Youth career
- 2007: Štrommi
- 2008–2015: TJK Legion

Senior career*
Years	Team	Apps	(Gls)
2016	Flora III	9	(0)
2016–2022	Flora II	60	(7)
2017–2024	Flora	111	(7)
2021	→ Helsingborgs IF (loan)	19	(0)
2022	→ Veres Rivne (loan)	0	(0)
2022	→ Skövde AIK (loan)	7	(0)
2023	→ St Patrick's Athletic (loan)	11	(0)
2025	Sigma Olomouc	1	(0)
2025	→ Sigma Olomouc B	8	(0)
2025–	Flora	35	(3)

International career^{‡}
2017	Estonia U19	4	(0)
2019	Estonia U21	3	(0)
2019–	Estonia	23	(0)
- * Club domestic league appearances and goals as of 17 November 2026 ‡ National team caps and goals as of 20:57, 1 April 2026 (UTC)

Vladislav Kreida (born 25 September 1999) is an Estonian professional footballer who plays as a midfielder for Flora. He also represents the Estonia national team.

== Club career ==
Born in Tallinn, Kreida played youth football with local sides Štrommi and TJK Legion before signing for Flora in 2016. He initially played with Flora III and Flora II before making his first team debut in 2017. Kreida was part of the team that won the Meistriliiga in 2019 and 2020, as well as winning the Estonian Cup in 2019–20. In 2021, he was loaned out to Superettan side Helsingborgs IF who he helped to promotion to the Allsvenskan. In early 2022, he signed for Ukrainian Premier League side Veres Rivne but returned to his parent club without making an appearance due to the 2022 Russian invasion of Ukraine. On 31 March 2022, Kreida joined Skövde AIK in Sweden on loan. He picked up his third Meistriliiga medal following Flora's league win in 2022. Kreida signed for League of Ireland Premier Division club St Patrick's Athletic on a season long loan deal on 12 January 2023. He made his debut on 17 February 2023 in the first game of the season against Derry City, providing an assist for Joe Redmond's 89th-minute equaliser in a 1–1 draw. On 1 July 2023, it was announced that Kreida's loan spell with the club was cut short having made just 11 appearances in the club's 25 games in all competitions up to that point. On 17 September 2023, he made his 200th senior club career appearance in all competitions in a 0–0 draw for Flora away to Nõmme Kalju. On 4 January 2025, he signed for Czech First League club Sigma Olomouc on a permanent basis.

On 21 August 2025, Kreida returned to FC Flora.

== International career ==
Kreida made his senior international debut for Estonia on 11 June 2019, replacing Konstantin Vassiljev in the 82nd minute of a 0–8 away loss to Germany in a UEFA Euro 2020 qualifying match. In June 2021, Kreida featured in both a 1–0 win over Lithuania and a 2–1 win over Latvia which resulted in his country winning the 2020 Baltic Cup.

== Career statistics ==
=== Club ===
As of match played on 22 March 2026

Appearances and goals by club, season and competition
Club	Season	League			National Cup (Note: Includes the Estonian Cup, Svenska Cupen)		Europe		Other		Total	
Club	Season	Division	Apps	Goals	Apps	Goals	Apps	Goals	Apps	Goals	Apps	Goals
Flora III	2016	Esiliiga B	9	0	—		—		—		9	0
Flora II	2016	Esiliiga	17	0	1	0	—		—		18	0
Flora II	2017	Esiliiga	23	3	—		—		—		23	3
Flora II	2018	Esiliiga	19	4	—		—		—		19	4
Flora II	2022	Esiliiga	1	0	—		—		—		1	0
Flora II	Total		60	7	1	0	—		—		61	7
Flora	2017	Meistriliiga	0	0	1	0	0 (Note: Appearances in the UEFA Europa League)	0	0 (Note: Appearances in the Estonian Supercup)	0	1	0
Flora	2018	Meistriliiga	5	0	2	0	0 (Note: Appearances in the UEFA Champions League & UEFA Europa League)	0	0	0	7	0
Flora	2019	Meistriliiga	31	0	0	0	4	0	—		35	0
Flora	2020	Meistriliiga	24	3	2	0	4 (Note: 1 appearance in the UEFA Champions League & 3 appearances in the UEFA Europa League)	0	1	0	31	3
Flora	2021	Meistriliiga	0	0	—		—		—		0	0
Flora	2022	Meistriliiga	9	1	1	0	—		0	0	10	1
Flora	2023	Meistriliiga	10	0	1	1	1 (Note: Appearances in the UEFA Champions League)	0	—		12	1
Flora	2024	Meistriliiga	32	3	1	0	6 (Note: 2 appearances in the UEFA Champions League & 4 appearances, 1 goal in the UEFA Conference League)	1	1	0	40	4
Flora	Total		111	7	8	1	15	1	2	0	136	9
Helsingborgs IF (loan)	2021	Superettan	19	0	4	0	—		2 (Note: Appearances in the Allsvenskan promotion/relegation play-offs)	0	25	0
Veres Rivne (loan)	2021–22	Ukrainian Premier League	0	0	—		—		—		0	0
Skövde AIK (loan)	2022	Superettan	7	0	—		—		—		7	0
St Patrick's Athletic (loan)	2023	LOI Premier Division	11	0	—		—		0 (Note: Appearances in the Leinster Senior Cup)	0	11	0
Sigma Olomouc	2024–25	Czech First League	1	0	0	0	—		—		1	0
Sigma Olomouc B	2024–25	Czech National Football League	8	0	—		—		—		8	0
Flora	2025	Meistriliiga	10	0	1	0	—		—		11	0
Flora	2026	Meistriliiga	3	0	2	0	0	0	1	0	6	0
Flora	Total		13	0	3	0	0	0	1	0	17	0
Career total			239	14	16	1	15	1	5	0	275	16

=== International ===
As of match played 30 March 2026

Appearances and goals by national team and year
National team	Year	Apps	Goals
Estonia	2019	3	0
Estonia	2020	8	0
Estonia	2021	7	0
Estonia	2022	3	0
Estonia	2023	0	0
Estonia	2024	0	0
Estonia	2025	0	0
Estonia	2026	2	0
Total		23	0

== Honours ==
=== Club ===
Flora

- Meistriliiga (5): 2019, 2020, 2022, 2023, 2025
- Estonian Cup: 2019–20
- Estonian Supercup: 2024

=== International ===
Estonia

- Baltic Cup: 2020

=== Individual ===
- Meistriliiga Team of the season: 2020
