= 2019 Esiliiga =

Estonian football league season for second division

Esiliiga
- Season: 2019
- Dates: 7 March 2019 – 10 November 2019
- Champions: Legion
- Promoted: Legion
- Relegated: Tarvas; Tallinna Kalev U21; Welco
- Matches: 180
- Goals: 654 (3.63 per match)
- Top goalscorer: Rejal Alijev (38 goals)
- Biggest home win: Legion 18–0 Järve (26 October 2019)
- Biggest away win: Tallinna Kalev U21 1–6 Tarvas (25 May 2019); Vaprus 1–6 FCI Levadia U21 (12 September 2019); Tarvas 0–5 Vaprus (28 September 2019); Elva 0–5 Legion (10 November 2019)
- Highest scoring: Legion 18–0 Järve (26 October 2019)

The 2019 Esiliiga was the 29th season of the Esiliiga, the second tier of Estonian football.

== Teams ==
A total of 10 teams were contesting the league, including six sides from the 2018 season, one relegated from 2018 Meistriliiga and three promoted from the 2018 Esiliiga B. The 2017 Esiliiga and 2018 Esiliiga champions Maardu Linnameeskond were promoted to the highest tier for the first time. Nõmme Kalju U21 was the first team to suffer relegation after just returning to Esiliiga. Keila also immediately returned to Esiliiga B after losing the relegation play-offs to Järve. Tallinna Kalev U21 narrowly avoided relegation in its debut season thanks to Santos' decision to start the new season in the fourth tier II liiga. The other two promoted teams were Legion, who went almost unbeaten in its previous season, and Tammeka U21, who made its debut in the Esiliiga.

=== Stadiums and locations ===
Locations of the 2019 Esiliiga teams

Team	Location	Stadium	Capacity
Elva	Elva	Elva linnastaadion	30
FCI Levadia U21	Tallinn	Maarjamäe Stadium	30
Flora U21	Tallinn	Lilleküla training ground I	150
Järve	Kohtla-Järve	Kohtla-Järve Sports Centre Stadium	150
Legion	Tallinn	Kadriorg Stadium	1,300
Tallinna Kalev U21	Tallinn	Kalev Keskstaadion artificial turf	270
Tammeka U21	Tartu	Tartu Sepa Football Centre	754
Tarvas	Rakvere	Rakvere linnastaadion	1,100
Vaprus	Pärnu	Pärnu Rannastaadion	1,501
Welco	Tartu	Tartu Tamme Stadium	1,500

=== Personnel and kits ===
Team	Manager	Captain	Kit manufacturer	Shirt sponsor
Elva	(Estonia) Veiko Haan	(Estonia) Jürgen Kuresoo	Nike	Sportland
FCI Levadia U21	(Estonia) Vladimir Vassiljev	(Estonia) Moorits Veering	Adidas	Viimsi Keevitus
Flora U21	(Estonia) Ats Sillaste		Nike	Tele2
Järve	(Estonia) Andrei Škaleta	(Estonia) Gleb Pevtsov	Adidas	
Legion	(Estonia) Denis Belov		Uhlsport	
Tallinna Kalev U21	(Estonia) Daniel Meijel		Nike	
Tammeka U21	(Estonia) Marti Pähn		Nike	
Tarvas	(Estonia) Tarmo Rebane	(Estonia) Alari Tovstik	Nike	Aqva Hotel & Spa
Vaprus	(Estonia) Taavi Midenbritt (Estonia) Kalev Pajula	(Estonia) Kristen Saarts	Nike	Coolbet
Welco	(Estonia) Janar Sagim	(Estonia) Mikk Valtna	Nike	Liisi

=== Managerial changes ===
Team	Outgoing manager	Manner of departure	Date of vacancy	Position in the table	Incoming manager	Date of appointment
Vaprus	(Estonia) Indrek Zelinsk	Signed by KTP	10 November 2018	Pre-season	(Estonia) Taavi Midenbritt (Estonia) Kalev Pajula	22 November 2018
Welco	(Germany) Yusuf Erdoğan	Mutual consent	25 July 2019	10th	(Estonia) Janar Sagim	25 July 2019

== League table ==
Pos	Team	Pld	W	D	L	GF	GA	GD	Pts	Promotion, qualification or relegation
1	Legion (C, P)	36	29	4	3	127	35	+92	91	Promotion to the Meistriliiga
2	Flora U21 (Note: Reserve teams are ineligible for promotion.)	36	22	7	7	85	37	+48	73	
3	Vaprus	36	21	4	11	73	48	+25	67	Qualification for promotion play-offs
4	Tammeka U21	36	18	4	14	59	55	+4	58	
5	Elva	36	18	2	16	67	63	+4	56	
6	FCI Levadia U21	36	16	5	15	80	65	+15	53	
7	Järve	36	12	4	20	51	82	−31	40	
8	Tarvas (R)	36	8	4	24	35	98	−63	28	Qualification for relegation play-offs
9	Tallinna Kalev U21 (R)	36	8	4	24	38	82	−44	28	Relegation to the Esiliiga B
10	Welco (R)	36	6	6	24	39	89	−50	24	Relegation to the Esiliiga B

Rules for classification: 1) Points; 2) Less matches awarded against; 3) Head-to-head points; 4) Head-to-head goal difference; 5) Matches won; 6) Goal difference; 7) Goals scored; 8) Away goals scored; 9) Fairplay ranking.
(C) Champions; (P) Promoted; (R) Relegated

== Results ==
=== Matches 1–18 ===
Home \ Away	ELV	LEV	FLO	JÄR	LEG	KAL	TAM	TAR	VAP	WEL
Elva	—	4–0	1–3	1–0	1–2	1–3	3–2	6–0	3–2	3–0
FCI Levadia U21	1–2	—	1–1	2–2	1–4	1–1	2–1	3–3	0–3	4–1
Flora U21	5–1	3–0	—	0–1	1–2	4–1	0–0	8–0	0–0	3–1
Järve	2–1	4–1	4–3	—	2–3	3–1	0–2	2–0	1–1	2–1
Legion	4–1	3–0	3–0	3–0	—	0–0 (Note: The match was awarded to Tallinna Kalev U21 due to Legion fielding an ineligible player.)	3–0	9–0	2–0	2–1
Tallinna Kalev U21	0–4	1–5	0–3	3–4	2–5	—	2–1	1–6	4–2	3–0
Tammeka U21	1–0	1–2	1–2	0–1	3–3	1–0	—	2–0	1–0	3–0
Tarvas	2–0	1–0	0–2	3–2	0–3	0–1	0–3	—	1–2	3–1
Vaprus	2–1	3–0	0–0	1–0	1–2	3–1	4–1	5–0	—	5–1
Welco	2–2	2–5	1–5	0–2	2–4	3–2	1–1	1–1	0–2	—

Source: Estonian Football Association (in Estonian)
Legend: Blue = home team win; Yellow = draw; Red = away team win.

=== Matches 19–36 ===
Home \ Away	ELV	LEV	FLO	JÄR	LEG	KAL	TAM	TAR	VAP	WEL
Elva	—	0–1	3–2	2–0	0–5	2–2	4–1	2–0	2–0	3–1
FCI Levadia U21	5–1	—	0–2	3–2	3–3	6–1	7–1	4–0	1–2	4–0
Flora U21	5–1	2–0	—	5–2	5–3	2–0	5–1	2–0	0–3	1–1
Järve	0–1	0–2	1–2	—	0–2	0–1	2–3	2–3	1–3	2–1
Legion	5–3	2–0	1–2	18–0	—	4–0	4–0	2–0	5–2	6–2
Tallinna Kalev U21	1–2	0–4	0–0	1–1	0–1	—	0–2	0–1	2–3	2–3
Tammeka U21	1–0	4–2	1–0	2–0	1–1	2–0	—	4–1	3–1	0–1
Tarvas	1–4	4–2	0–2	2–2	0–4	1–2	1–4	—	0–5	1–1
Vaprus	0–1	1–6	3–3	5–2	0–2	1–0	2–1	1–0	—	3–0
Welco	2–1	0–2	0–2	0–2	2–2	1–0	1–4	4–0	1–2	—

Source: Estonian Football Association (in Estonian)
Legend: Blue = home team win; Yellow = draw; Red = away team win.

== Relegation play-offs ==
17 November 2019
13:00 (UTC+2)

Pärnu Jalgpalliklubi	3–2	Tarvas
Makovei 9', 85'; Pärnat 77' (pen.)	Report	Rannamäe 63' (pen.), 87'

Pärnu Rannastaadion, Pärnu
Attendance: 70
Referee: Martti Pukk
23 November 2019
13:00 (UTC+2)

Tarvas	0–4	Pärnu Jalgpalliklubi
	Report	Pärnat 21'; Makovei 28', 85'; Kauniste 64'

Rakvere artificial turf, Rakvere
Attendance: 166
Referee: Kristo Külljastinen

Pärnu Jalgpalliklubi won 7–2 on aggregate.

== Season statistics ==
=== Top scorers ===
Rank	Player	Club	Goals
1	(Estonia) Rejal Alijev	Legion	38
2	(Estonia) Marek Šatov	Legion	26
3	(Estonia) Kristen Saarts	Vaprus	19
4	(Estonia) Raivo Saar	Järve	17
5	(Estonia) Aleksandr Šapovalov	Flora U21	16
5	(Estonia) Karl Anton Sõerde	Tallinna Kalev U21	16
5	(Estonia) Ronaldo Tiismaa	Vaprus	16
8	(Colombia) Duván Mosquera	Järve	15
9	(Estonia) Artjom Jermatšenko	Flora U21	14
9	(Estonia) Erki Mõttus	Tammeka U21	14

== Awards ==
=== Monthly awards ===
Month	Manager of the Month		Player of the Month	
Month	Manager	Club	Player	Club
March	(Estonia) Denis Belov	Legion	(Estonia) Raivo Saar	Järve
April	(Estonia) Andrei Škaleta	Järve	(Estonia) Ronaldo Tiismaa	Vaprus
May	(Estonia) Taavi Midenbritt (Estonia) Kalev Pajula	Vaprus	(Estonia) Daaniel Maanas	Tammeka U21
June	(Estonia) Denis Belov	Legion	(Estonia) Martin Thomson	Elva
July	(Estonia) Veiko Haan	Elva	(Estonia) Ralf-Sander Suvinõmm	Flora U21
August	(Estonia) Marti Pähn	Tammeka U21	(Estonia) Hendrik Vainu	Vaprus
September	(Estonia) Vladimir Vassiljev	FCI Levadia U21	(Estonia) Marek Šatov	Legion
October	(Estonia) Denis Belov	Legion	(Estonia) Rejal Alijev	Legion

=== Esiliiga Player of the Year ===
Denis Vnukov was named Esiliiga Player of the Year.

== See also ==
- 2018–19 Estonian Cup
- 2019–20 Estonian Cup
- 2019 Meistriliiga
- 2019 Esiliiga B
