= 2018 Esiliiga =

Estonian football league season for second division

Esiliiga
- Season: 2018
- Champions: Maardu Linnameeskond (2nd title)
- Promoted: Maardu Linnameeskond
- Relegated: Keila; Nõmme Kalju U21
- Matches: 180
- Goals: 624 (3.47 per match)
- Top goalscorer: Vitali Gussev (43 goals)
- Biggest home win: Flora U21 11–0 Welco (30 August 2018)
- Biggest away win: Keila 0–9 Flora U21 (10 March 2018)
- Highest scoring: Flora U21 10–1 Keila (24 March 2018); Maardu Linnameeskond 10–1 Nõmme Kalju U21 (14 July 2018); Flora U21 11–0 Welco (30 August 2018)
- Longest winning run: 7 matches Maardu Linnameeskond
- Longest unbeaten run: 11 matches Flora U21
- Longest winless run: 16 matches Nõmme Kalju U21
- Longest losing run: 11 matches Nõmme Kalju U21

The 2018 Esiliiga was the 28th season of the Esiliiga, the second-highest Estonian league for association football clubs, since its establishment in 1992. The season began on 1 March 2018 and concluded on 11 November 2018. Defending champions Maardu Linnameeskond won their second Esiliiga title.

== Teams ==
Ten teams competed in the league – the seven teams from the previous season and the three teams promoted from the Esiliiga B. The promoted teams were Nõmme Kalju U21 (returning to the Esiliiga after a one-year absence), Tallinna Kalev U21 and Keila (both teams playing in the Esiliiga for the first time ever). They replaced Tallinna Kalev, Kuressaare (both teams promoted to the Meistriliiga) and FCI Tallinn U21 (merged with Levadia U21).

=== Stadiums and locations ===
Locations of the 2018 Esiliiga teams

| Team | Location | Stadium | Capacity |
|---|---|---|---|
| Elva | Elva | Elva linnastaadion | 600 |
| FCI Levadia U21 | Tallinn | Maarjamäe Stadium | 30 |
| Flora U21 | Tallinn | Sportland Arena | 540 |
| Keila | Keila | Keila Stadium | 500 |
| Maardu Linnameeskond | Maardu | Maardu linnastaadion | 500 |
| Nõmme Kalju U21 | Tallinn | Hiiu Stadium | 650 |
| Santos | Tartu | Tartu Tamme Stadium | 1,500 |
| Tallinna Kalev U21 | Tallinn | Kalev Keskstaadion's artificial turf | 570 |
| Tarvas | Rakvere | Rakvere linnastaadion | 1,829 |
| Welco | Tartu | Tartu Tamme Stadium | 1,500 |

=== Personnel and kits ===
| Team | Manager | Captain | Kit manufacturer | Shirt sponsor |
|---|---|---|---|---|
| Elva | (Estonia) Veiko Haan | (Estonia) Jürgen Kuresoo | Nike | Sportland |
| FCI Levadia U21 | (Estonia) Vladimir Vassiljev | (Estonia) Moorits Veering | Adidas | Viimsi Keevitus |
| Flora U21 | (Estonia) Ats Sillaste | (Estonia) Markkus Seppik | Nike | Tele2 |
| Keila | (England) Richard Barnwell | (Estonia) Kermo Kiiler | Adidas | Hole In One |
| Maardu Linnameeskond | (Estonia) Andrei Borissov | (Estonia) Ilja Zelentsov | Adidas | |
| Nõmme Kalju U21 | (Estonia) Kristen Viikmäe | (Estonia) Marcus Suurväli | Adidas | help.ee |
| Santos | (Estonia) Janar Sagim | (Estonia) Joonas Kartsep | Adidas | |
| Tallinna Kalev U21 | (Estonia) Daniel Meijel | (Estonia) Andi Kivirand | Nike | Coolbet |
| Tarvas | (Estonia) Tarmo Rebane | (Estonia) Kaarel Saar | Nike | Aqva Hotel & Spa |
| Welco | (Germany) Yusuf Erdoğan | (Estonia) Mikk Valtna | Nike | Liisi |

=== Managerial changes ===
| Team | Outgoing manager | Manner of departure | Date of vacancy | Position in table | Incoming manager | Date of appointment |
|---|---|---|---|---|---|---|
| Welco | (Estonia) Siim Valtna | Mutual consent | 7 November 2017 | Pre-season | (Germany) Yusuf Erdoğan | 8 December 2017 |
| Flora U21 | (Estonia) Joel Indermitte | Mutual consent | 10 November 2017 | Pre-season | (Estonia) Ats Sillaste | 10 November 2017 |
| Tarvas | (Estonia) Urmas Kirs | Mutual consent | 30 November 2017 | Pre-season | (Estonia) Tarmo Rebane | 30 November 2017 |
| Nõmme Kalju U21 | (Estonia) Erko Saviauk | Mutual consent | 31 December 2017 | Pre-season | (Estonia) Valeri Bondarenko | 1 January 2018 |
| Keila | (Estonia) Tiit Tikenberg | Mutual consent | 6 January 2018 | Pre-season | (England) Richard Barnwell | 6 January 2018 |
| Nõmme Kalju U21 | (Estonia) Valeri Bondarenko | Mutual consent | 7 August 2018 | 10th | (Germany) Frank Bernhardt | 7 August 2018 |
| Nõmme Kalju U21 | (Germany) Frank Bernhardt | Resigned | September 2018 | 10th | (Estonia) Kristen Viikmäe | September 2018 |

== League table ==
| Pos | Team | Pld | W | D | L | GF | GA | GD | Pts | Promotion, qualification or relegation |
|---|---|---|---|---|---|---|---|---|---|---|
| 1 | Maardu Linnameeskond (C, P) | 36 | 29 | 1 | 6 | 126 | 41 | +85 | 88 | Promotion to the Meistriliiga |
| 2 | Flora U21 (Note: Reserve teams are ineligible for promotion.) | 36 | 21 | 8 | 7 | 115 | 31 | +84 | 71 | |
| 3 | FCI Levadia U21 | 36 | 18 | 7 | 11 | 67 | 56 | +11 | 61 | |
| 4 | Elva (Q) | 36 | 15 | 10 | 11 | 51 | 66 | −15 | 55 | Qualification for promotion play-offs |
| 5 | Tarvas | 36 | 14 | 10 | 12 | 62 | 60 | +2 | 52 | |
| 6 | Welco | 36 | 12 | 6 | 18 | 44 | 78 | −34 | 42 | |
| 7 | Santos (Note: Santos withdrew from the Esiliiga and were relegated to the II liiga.) (R) | 36 | 11 | 8 | 17 | 47 | 68 | −21 | 41 | Relegation to II liiga |
| 8 | Tallinna Kalev U21 | 36 | 10 | 9 | 17 | 37 | 52 | −15 | 39 | |
| 9 | Keila (R) | 36 | 10 | 5 | 21 | 41 | 88 | −47 | 35 | Qualification for relegation play-offs |
| 10 | Nõmme Kalju U21 (R) | 36 | 5 | 6 | 25 | 37 | 89 | −52 | 21 | Relegation to Esiliiga B |

Source: Soccerway (in English), Esiliiga (in Estonian)
Rules for classification: 1) Points; 2) Less matches awarded against; 3) Head-to-head points; 4) Head-to-head goal difference; 5) Matches won; 6) Goal difference; 7) Goals scored; 8) Away goals scored; 9) Fairplay ranking.
(C) Champions; (P) Promoted; (Q) Qualified for the phase indicated; (R) Relegated

== Play-offs ==
=== Promotion play-offs ===
==== First leg ====
17 November 2018
13:00 (UTC+2)

| Elva | 0–1 | Kuressaare |
|---|---|---|
| | Report | Laht 50' (pen.) |

Elva linnastaadion, Elva
Attendance: 235
Referee: Siim Rinken

==== Second leg ====
24 November 2018
13:00 (UTC+2)

| Kuressaare | 1–0 | Elva |
|---|---|---|
| Saar 61' | Report |

Kuressaare artificial turf, Kuressaare
Attendance: 152
Referee: Kristo Tohver

Kuressaare won 2–0 on aggregate and retained their place in the 2019 Meistriliiga.

=== Relegation play-offs ===
==== First leg ====
17 November 2018
13:00 (UTC+2)

| Järve | 3–1 | Keila |
|---|---|---|
| Saar 56'; Ivanyushin 83' (pen.); Yuri 85' | Report | Tikenberg 89' (pen.) |

Kohtla-Järve Sports Centre Stadium, Kohtla-Järve
Attendance: 83
Referee: Toomas Nõmmiste

==== Second leg ====
24 November 2018
13:00 (UTC+2)

| Keila | 1–0 | Järve |
|---|---|---|
| Tikenberg 59' | Report |

Keila Stadium's artificial turf, Keila
Attendance: 110
Referee: Martti Pukk

Järve won 3–2 on aggregate and were promoted to the 2019 Esiliiga.

== Results ==
=== First half of the season ===
| Home \ Away | ELV | LEV | FLO | KEI | MAA | KLJ | SAN | KLV | TAR | WEL |
|---|---|---|---|---|---|---|---|---|---|---|
| Elva | — | 1–1 | 2–2 | 3–0 | 1–2 | 2–0 | 1–0 | 3–1 | 2–3 | 2–0 |
| FCI Levadia U21 | 2–1 | — | 0–4 | 1–3 | 0–3 | 1–1 | 0–0 | 4–0 | 3–0 | 2–1 |
| Flora U21 | 5–0 | 2–2 | — | 10–1 | 2–1 | 1–3 | 3–0 | 1–0 | 1–1 | 5–1 |
| Keila | 0–0 | 0–0 | 0–9 | — | 1–2 | 3–2 | 3–1 | 3–2 | 0–2 | 0–1 |
| Maardu | 8–1 | 3–2 | 0–0 | 4–0 | — | 2–0 | 4–0 | 1–0 | 4–1 | 5–1 |
| Nõmme Kalju U21 | 1–1 | 2–0 | 1–2 | 1–1 | 1–2 | — | 0–5 | 0–4 | 1–2 | 3–2 |
| Santos | 0–1 | 2–0 | 1–6 | 4–1 | 2–1 | 2–2 | — | 0–2 | 1–1 | 1–2 |
| Kalev U21 | 0–0 | 1–3 | 0–0 | 1–0 | 0–4 | 2–0 | 1–0 | — | 0–0 | 1–1 |
| Tarvas | 5–1 | 1–1 | 2–2 | 2–3 | 3–2 | 4–2 | 2–1 | 1–2 | — | 2–3 |
| Welco | 1–2 | 1–1 | 1–0 | 0–0 | 0–1 | 2–0 | 1–5 | 2–1 | 1–2 | — |

Source: Estonian Football Association (in Estonian)
Legend: Blue = home team win; Yellow = draw; Red = away team win.

=== Second half of the season ===
| Home \ Away | ELV | LEV | FLO | KEI | MAA | KLJ | SAN | KLV | TAR | WEL |
|---|---|---|---|---|---|---|---|---|---|---|
| Elva | — | 0–6 | 2–1 | 2–1 | 2–5 | 3–2 | 0–0 | 1–0 | 4–2 | 0–0 |
| FCI Levadia U21 | 2–1 | — | 1–3 | 1–0 | 2–7 | 3–2 | 3–0 | 0–3 | 2–1 | 1–2 |
| Flora U21 | 5–0 | 3–5 | — | 0–1 | 5–0 | 6–0 | 7–0 | 5–0 | 4–1 | 11–0 |
| Keila | 0–2 | 1–5 | 1–0 | — | 4–6 | 4–1 | 4–0 | 2–0 | 1–3 | 1–2 |
| Maardu | 6–1 | 3–4 | 2–1 | 9–0 | — | 10–1 | 5–0 | 2–0 | 4–1 | 6–0 |
| Nõmme Kalju U21 | 1–3 | 0–3 | 1–1 | 2–0 | 0–1 | — | 3–1 | 1–1 | 1–2 | 1–3 |
| Santos | 1–1 | 1–0 | 0–0 | 2–1 | 0–5 | 4–0 | — | 4–1 | 2–0 | 1–3 |
| Kalev U21 | 1–1 | 1–2 | 0–1 | 4–0 | 0–3 | 1–0 | 1–1 | — | 1–3 | 1–1 |
| Tarvas | 0–0 | 0–1 | 1–2 | 1–1 | 2–1 | 2–1 | 2–2 | 1–1 | — | 1–1 |
| Welco | 0–4 | 2–3 | 0–5 | 3–0 | 0–2 | 3–0 | 1–3 | 1–3 | 1–2 | — |

Source: Estonian Football Association (in Estonian)
Legend: Blue = home team win; Yellow = draw; Red = away team win.

== Season statistics ==
=== Top scorers ===
| Rank | Player | Club | Goals |
|---|---|---|---|
| 1 | (Estonia) Vitali Gussev | Maardu Linnameeskond | 43 |
| 2 | (Estonia) Ilja Zelentsov | Maardu Linnameeskond | 22 |
| 3 | (Estonia) Erik Utgof | FCI Levadia U21 | 20 |
| 4 | (Estonia) Nikita Brõlin | Maardu Linnameeskond | 19 |
| 5 | (Estonia) Aleksandr Šapovalov | Flora U21 | 16 |
| 5 | (Estonia) Erik Sorga | Flora U21 | 16 |
| 7 | (Estonia) Jürgen Kuresoo | Elva | 13 |
| 7 | (Estonia) Otto-Robert Lipp | Flora U21 | 13 |
| 9 | (Estonia) Vladislav Ogorodnik | Maardu Linnameeskond | 12 |
| 9 | (Estonia) Karl Rudolf Õigus | Santos | 12 |
| 9 | (Estonia) Siim Rannamäe | Tarvas | 12 |
| 9 | (Estonia) Vlasiy Sinyavskiy | Nõmme Kalju U21 | 12 |
| 9 | (Estonia) Mikk Valtna | Welco | 12 |

== Awards ==
=== Monthly awards ===
| Month | Manager of the Month | | Player of the Month | |
| Month | Manager | Club | Player | Club |
|---|---|---|---|---|
| March | (Estonia) Andrei Borissov | Maardu Linnameeskond | (Estonia) Erik Sorga | Flora U21 |
| April | (Estonia) Tarmo Rebane | Tarvas | (Estonia) Mikk Valtna | Welco |
| May | (Estonia) Veiko Haan | Elva | (Estonia) Aleksandr Šapovalov | Flora U21 |
| June/July | (Estonia) Andrei Borissov | Maardu Linnameeskond | (Estonia) Jürgen Kuresoo | Elva |
| August | (Estonia) Vladimir Vassiljev | FCI Levadia U21 | (Estonia) Vladislav Ogorodnik | Maardu Linnameeskond |
| September | (Estonia) Veiko Haan | Elva | (Estonia) Nikita Brõlin | Maardu Linnameeskond |
| October | (Estonia) Veiko Haan | Elva | (Estonia) Mattias Männilaan | Flora U21 |

=== Esiliiga Player of the Year ===
Vitali Gussev was named Esiliiga Player of the Year.

== See also ==
- 2017–18 Estonian Cup
- 2018–19 Estonian Cup
- 2018 Meistriliiga
- 2018 Esiliiga B
