= Esiliiga B Player of the Year =

Estonian football award

The Esiliiga B Player of the Year is an annual award given to the best Esiliiga B player for his performances in the league.

== Winners ==
Year	Player	Club
2014	(Ukraine) Yuriy Vereshchak	Santos
2015	(Estonia) Jürgen Kuresoo (1)	Elva
2016	(Estonia) Jürgen Kuresoo (2)	Elva
2017	(Estonia) Karl Anton Sõerde (1)	Tallinna Kalev U21
2018	(Estonia) Rejal Alijev	Legion
2019	(Estonia) Martin Pärn	Vändra
2020	(Estonia) Kevor Palumets	Paide Linnameeskond U21
2021	(Estonia) Karl Anton Sõerde (2)	Viimsi
2022	(Estonia) Tristan Pajo	Tabasalu
2023	(Estonia) Priit Peedo	Tartu Kalev
2024	(Georgia (country)) Akaki Gvineria	Tammeka U21
2025	(Estonia) Aleksandr Volkov	Maardu Linnameeskond

== See also ==
- Meistriliiga Player of the Year
- Esiliiga Player of the Year
