= List of Estonian football transfers summer 2009 =

This is a list of Estonian summer football transfers for the 2009 season. The window opened on 1 July 2009 and closed on 31 July 2009.

== Meistriliiga ==
=== Flora ===
In	From
(Georgia (country)) Ernest Akhalbedashvili	Unknown
(Estonia) Andre Frolov	Tulevik
(Estonia) Jürgen Kuresoo	Tulevik
(Estonia) Stanislav Pedõk	Flora II
(Estonia) Edwin Stüf	Tallinna Kalev

Out	To
(Estonia) Siim Luts	Tulevik
(Estonia) Urmas Rooba	(loan) (Finland) FF Jaro
(Estonia) Joonas Tamm	(loan) (Italy) U.C. Sampdoria
(Estonia) Alen Stepanjan	(loan) (Latvia) FK Jauniba

=== Kalju ===
In	From
(Estonia) Janno Hermanson	Tallinna Kalev
(Brazil) (Italy) Rafael	(Netherlands) RC Heemstede
(Belarus) Vitali Shuhanau	Alko
(Estonia) Marek Mäekala	(Loan) Levadia II

Out	To
(Estonia) Rait Kuusk	Kalju II
(Estonia) Liivo Leetma	Paide LM
(Estonia) Andrus Mitt	Kalju II
(Brazil) Marcío Pimentel	Released
(Estonia) Aleksander Saharov	Retired
(Estonia) Julius Stokas	Kalju II
(Peru) (Sweden) Salvador Vasquez	Released
(Estonia) Anti Kõlu	(Loan) Tallinna Kalev

=== Kuressaare ===
In	From
(Estonia) Mark Švets	TJK Legion

Out	To

=== Levadia ===
In	From
(Russia) Vladislav Ivanov	Trans
(Estonia) Tarmo Neemelo	(Belgium) Zulte Waregem
(Estonia) Andero Pebre	Levadia II
(Finland) Tomi Saarelma	(Germany) 1. FC Kleve
(Estonia) Tõnis Starkopf	Tamme Auto

Out	To
(Russia) Nikita Andreev	(Spain) UD Almería
(Estonia) Anton Aristov	(Loan) Tammeka
(Estonia) Artjom Artjunin	(Loan) Tammeka
(Estonia) Andero Pebre	(Loan) Paide LM

=== Paide LM ===
In	From
(Estonia) Ervin Kõll	Tulevik
(Estonia) Liivo Leetma	Kalju
(Estonia) Timo Lomp	FCF Järva-Jaani
(Estonia) Andero Pebre	(Loan) Levadia

Out	To
(Estonia) Taavi Laurits	Vaprus
(Estonia) Tanel Võtti	Tulevik

=== Sillamäe Kalev ===
Roman Daniljuk	(Estonia)	DF	Lootus; Loan Return	(Estonia)
Kazimieras Gnedojus	(Lithuania)	DF	Sūduva	(Lithuania)
Evaldas Užkuraitis	(Lithuania)	DF	Atlantas	(Lithuania)
Gvidas Grigas	(Lithuania)	DF	Released
Vilius Lapeikis	(Lithuania)	DF	Released
Nerijus Mačiulis	(Lithuania)	MF	Released
Irfan Ametov	(Ukraine)	FW	Lootus	(Estonia)
Sergei Jegorov	(Estonia)	FW	Tulevik	(Estonia)

=== Tallinna Kalev ===
Maksim Paponov	(Estonia)	MF	CSKA Sofia	(Bulgaria)
Anti Kõlu	(Estonia)	FW	Kalju; Loan	(Estonia)
Janno Hermanson	(Estonia)	GK	Kalju	(Estonia)
Juri Tiisman	(Estonia)	MF	Tamme Auto	(Estonia)
Priidu Ahven	(Estonia)	FW	Warrior	(Estonia)
Edwin Stüf	(Estonia)	FW	Flora	(Estonia)

=== Tammeka ===
In	From
(Cameroon) Fidèle Afila Olémé	Unknown
(Estonia) Anton Aristov	(Loan) Levadia
(Estonia) Artjom Artjunin	(Loan) Levadia
(Brazil) Chiquinho	(Brazil) Fluminense de Feira
(Morocco) (Germany) Badr Hamdouchi	(Cyprus) Anagennisi Dherynia
(Germany) (Turkey) Secran Konal	(Germany) Ludwigsfelder FC
(Austria) Bernhard Schachner	(Austria) Jennersdorf
(Germany) Moritz Frederick Stehling	Unknown
(Estonia) Timo Teniste	Trans
(Greece) (Australia) Panagiotis Vouis	(Netherlands) Fortuna Sittard

Out	To
(Estonia) Ando Hausenberg	Unknown
(Estonia) Tanel Joosep	Tammeka II
(Estonia) Mihkel Kuresoo	Tammeka II
(Estonia) Marek Laasik	Tammeka II
(Estonia) Siim Rinken	Tammeka II
(Estonia) Erik Vares	Tammeka II
(Estonia) Kristjan Vomm	Tammeka II

=== Trans ===
Serhiy Ussoltsev	(Ukraine)	GK	Unknown
Aleksandr Volodin	(Estonia)	DF	Vėtra	(Lithuania)
Artjom Dmitrijev	(Estonia)	MF	Vėtra	(Lithuania)
Mandinho	(Brazil)	MF	LKKA ir Teledema	(Lithuania)
Nikolaj Misiuk	(Lithuania)	FW	Znicz Pruszków	(Poland)
Vitoldas Čepauskas	(Lithuania)	DF	Released
Timo Teniste	(Estonia)	DF	Tammeka	(Estonia)
Vladislav Ivanov	(Russia)	MF	Levadia	(Estonia)
Kristjan Tiirik	(Estonia)	FW	Released

=== Tulevik ===
Tanel Võtti	(Estonia)	DF	Paide LM	(Estonia)
Siim Luts	(Estonia)	MF	Flora Tallinn	(Estonia)
Rauno Alliku	(Estonia)	FW	Flora	(Estonia)
Sergei Jegorov	(Estonia)	FW	Sillamäe Kalev	(Estonia)
Andre Frolov	(Estonia)	MF	Flora	(Estonia)
Jürgen Kuresoo	(Estonia)	MF	Flora	(Estonia)
Ervin Kõll	(Estonia)	FW	Paide LM	(Estonia)

== Esiliiga ==
=== Flora II ===
Stanislav Pedõk	(Estonia)	GK	Flora	(Estonia)
Hannes Anier	(Estonia)	MF	Elva	(Estonia)
Erkki Junolainen	(Estonia)		Warrior	(Estonia)
Elvis Liivamägi	(Estonia)		Warrior	(Estonia)
Oliver Andres	(Estonia)		Warrior	(Estonia)
Raiko Karpov	(Estonia)		Warrior	(Estonia)
Karl-Eerik Luigend	(Estonia)		Tulevik II	(Estonia)
Sander Matsina	(Estonia)		Elva	(Estonia)
Juss Tanvel	(Estonia)		Elva	(Estonia)
Hans Tiitsmann	(Estonia)		Elva	(Estonia)

=== Flora Rakvere ===
Sergei Akimov	(Estonia)	FW	Lootus II	(Estonia)
Sergei Grintšin	(Estonia)		Youth team	(Estonia)
Mikk Mehike	(Estonia)		Youth team	(Estonia)
Toomas Kiis	(Estonia)		Youth team	(Estonia)
Elari Valmas	(Estonia)	FW	Sörve	(Estonia)
Rasko Parve	(Estonia)	MF	Free agent	(Estonia)
Taavi Trasberg	(Estonia)		Elva	(Estonia)

=== Tulevik II ===
Karl-Eerik Luigend	(Estonia)	MF	Flora II	(Estonia)
Indrek Ilves	(Estonia)		Youth team	(Estonia)
Alen Stepanjan	(Estonia)	FW	Warrior	(Estonia)
Tanel Melts	(Estonia)	MF	Vaprus	(Estonia)

=== Warrior ===
Priidu Ahven	(Estonia)	Tallinna Kalev	(Estonia)
Oliver Andres	(Estonia)	Flora II	(Estonia)
Raiko Karpov	(Estonia)	Flora II	(Estonia)
Keido Seppi	(Estonia)	Tabasalu	(Estonia)
Alen Stepanjan	(Estonia)	Tulevik II	(Estonia)
Bert Klemmer	(Estonia)	Elva	(Estonia)
Marten Mütt	(Estonia)	Elva	(Estonia)
Erkki Junolainen	(Estonia)	Flora II	(Estonia)
Elvis Liivamägi	(Estonia)	Flora II	(Estonia)
Kaspar Kaldoja	(Estonia)	Tammeka II	(Estonia)
Rasmus Armas	(Estonia)	Elva	(Estonia)
Toomas Pent	(Estonia)	Elva	(Estonia)
Martin Pley	(Estonia)	Elva	(Estonia)
Jaan Kekišev	(Estonia)	Elva	(Estonia)
Sander Karu	(Estonia)	Elva	(Estonia)

== II Liiga ==
=== Elva ===
Rasmus Armas	(Estonia)	GK	Warrior	(Estonia)
Toomas Pent	(Estonia)		Warrior	(Estonia)
Martin Pley	(Estonia)		Warrior	(Estonia)
Jaan Kekišev	(Estonia)	MF	Warrior	(Estonia)
Sander Karu	(Estonia)		Warrior	(Estonia)
Sander Matsina	(Estonia)		Flora II	(Estonia)
Juss Tanvel	(Estonia)		Flora II	(Estonia)
Hans Tiitsmann	(Estonia)		Flora II	(Estonia)
Taavi Trasberg	(Estonia)		Flora Rakvere	(Estonia)
Bert Klemmer	(Estonia)		Warrior	(Estonia)
Marten Mütt	(Estonia)		Warrior	(Estonia)
Hannes Anier	(Estonia)	MF	Flora II	(Estonia)

== See also ==
- 2009 Meistriliiga
- 2009 Esiliiga
