= 2013 Esiliiga B =

Estonian football league season for third division

Esiliiga B
- Season: 2013
- Champions: Nõmme Kalju II
- Promoted: Nõmme Kalju II; Pärnu Linnameeskond
- Relegated: Dünamo Tallinn; Flora III Tallinn; Järve Kohtla-Järve
- Matches played: 180
- Goals scored: 651 (3.62 per match)
- Top goalscorer: Jürgen Kuresoo (33 goals)
- Biggest home win: Pärnu Linnameeskond 10–0 Flora III Tallinn (3 August)
- Biggest away win: Flora III Tallinn 0–8 Elva (28 July)
- Highest scoring: Pärnu Linnameeskond 10–0 Flora III Tallinn (3 August)

The 2013 season of the Esiliiga B, the third level in the Estonian football system, was the first season in the league's history. The season officially began on 3 March 2013 and ended on 10 November 2013. However, on 3 March the Estonian Football Association announced that all matches scheduled for 3 March 2013 would be postponed due to heavy snowfall.

== Teams ==
=== Stadiums and locations ===
Location of the 2013 Esiliiga B teams

Team	Location	Stadium	Capacity
Pärnu Linnameeskond	Pärnu	Pärnu Kalev Stadium	1,900
Järve Kohtla-Järve	Kohtla-Järve	Kohtla-Järve SPK Stadium	780
HÜJK Emmaste	Tallinn	Männiku Stadium	1,000
Sillamäe Kalev II	Sillamäe	Sillamäe Kalev Stadium	500
Nõmme Kalju II	Tallinn	Hiiu Stadium	2,730
Elva	Elva	Elva Stadium	1,500
Legion Tallinn	Tallinn	Sportland Arena	800
Ararat TTÜ Tallinn	Tallinn	Sportland Arena	800
Dünamo Tallinn	Tallinn	Sõle Stadium	500
Flora III Tallinn	Tallinn	Sportland Arena	800

=== Personnel and kits ===
Note: Flags indicate national team as has been defined under FIFA eligibility rules. Players and Managers may hold more than one non-FIFA nationality.

Team	Manager	Captain	Kit manufacturer	Shirt sponsor
Pärnu Linnameeskond	(Estonia) Gert Olesk			
Järve Kohtla-Järve	(Estonia) Andrei Škaleta			
HÜJK Emmaste	(Estonia) Marko Pärnpuu	(Estonia) Vahur Vahtramäe	Hummel	
Sillamäe Kalev II	(Lithuania) Algimantas Briaunys (Ukraine) Vadym Dobizha		Uhlsport	Alexela
Nõmme Kalju II	(Estonia) Zaur Tšilingarašvili	(Estonia) Martin Mägi	Adidas	Maxima
Elva	(Estonia) Marek Naaris		Nike	
Legion Tallinn	(Russia) Mikhail Artyukhov			
Ararat TTÜ Tallinn	(Estonia) Vaagn Arutjunjan	(Estonia) Avetis Harutjunjan	Nike	
Dünamo Tallinn	(Estonia) Viktor Nešeretnõi			
Flora III Tallinn	(Estonia) Dmitri Ustritski	(Estonia) Maikel Astur	Nike	

=== Managerial changes ===
Team	Outgoing manager	Manner of departure	Date of vacancy	Position in table	Replaced by	Date of appointment
Flora III Tallinn	(Estonia) Jürgen Henn	Signed by Flora II Tallinn	21 July 2013	9th	(Estonia) Dmitri Ustritski	21 July 2013

== Results ==
=== League table ===
Pos	Team	Pld	W	D	L	GF	GA	GD	Pts	Promotion or relegation
1	Nõmme Kalju II (C, P)	36	26	4	6	91	37	+54	82	Promotion to Esiliiga
2	Pärnu Linnameeskond (P)	36	25	4	7	114	53	+61	79	Promotion to Esiliiga
3	Sillamäe Kalev II	36	19	9	8	81	53	+28	66	Qualification for the promotion play-offs
4	Ararat TTÜ Tallinn	36	20	3	13	77	50	+27	63	
5	HÜJK Emmaste	36	18	7	11	69	45	+24	61	
6	Elva	36	13	7	16	56	64	−8	46	
7	Legion Tallinn	36	13	5	18	55	77	−22	44	
8	Dünamo Tallinn (R)	36	9	4	23	42	86	−44	31	Qualification for the relegation play-offs
9	Flora III Tallinn (R)	36	8	2	26	40	107	−67	26	Relegation to II liiga
10	Järve Kohtla-Järve (R)	36	4	5	27	26	79	−53	17	Relegation to II liiga

Source: Estonian Football Association (in Estonian)
Rules for classification: Points; Least withdrawals or annulled matches; Overall wins; Head-to-head points; Head-to-head goal difference; Goal difference; Goals scored. If two or more teams on the top have the same number of points by the end of the season, the aforementioned rules will not apply and additional game(s) will be played to determine the champions.
(C) Champions; (P) Promoted; (R) Relegated

=== Promotion play-off ===
At season's end, the 3rd place club of the 2013 Esiliiga B will participate in a two-legged play-off with the 8th club of the 2013 Esiliiga for the spot in next year's competition.

17 November 2013	Sillamäe Kalev II	1–4	Tulevik Viljandi	Sillamäe
13:00 EET (GMT+2)	Rando Leokin 72'	Report	Laansoo 19'; Peips 39'; Teor 48', 54'	Stadium: Sillamäe Kalev Kunstmurustaadion; Attendance: 65; Referee: Mart Martin

23 November 2013	Tulevik Viljandi	3–2	Sillamäe Kalev II	Viljandi
13:00 EET (GMT+2)	Teor 7', 20'; Luhakooder 13'	Report	Rando Leokin 40'; Mukhin 62'	Stadium: Viljandi Kunstmurustaadion; Attendance: 65; Referee: Miko Pupart

=== Relegation play-off ===
At season's end, the 8th place club of the 2013 Esiliiga B will participate in a two-legged play-off with the runners-up of the II Liiga for the spot in next year's competition.

17 November 2013	Infonet II Tallinn	6–1	Dünamo Tallinn	Tallinn
13:00 EET (GMT+2)	Tur 15', 71'; Spiridonov 28'; Televinov 36'; Klimovitš 56' (pen.); Muraveiko 60'	Report	Tšistjakov 85'	Stadium: Lasnamäe KJH Kunstmurustaadion; Attendance: 44; Referee: Grigori Ošomkov

23 November 2013	Dünamo Tallinn	0–5	Infonet II Tallinn	Tallinn
13:00 EET (GMT+2)		Report	Klimovitš 33'; Televinov 44'; Muraveiko 54'; Aksjonov 68'; Petrov 85'	Stadium: Lasnamäe SPK Stadium; Attendance: 29; Referee: Tomi Rahula

== Season statistics ==
=== Top goalscorers ===
As of 10 November 2013.

Rank	Player	Team	Goals
1	(Estonia) Jürgen Kuresoo	Elva	33
2	(Estonia) Henri Hanson	Pärnu Linnameeskond	28
3	(Estonia) Kristen Saarts	Pärnu Linnameeskond	24
4	(Russia) Irakli Torinava	Sillamäe Kalev II	20
5	(Estonia) Andre Järva	Ararat TTÜ Tallinn	16
5	(Estonia) Robert Kirss	Nõmme Kalju II	16
7	(Estonia) Andrei Antonov	Ararat TTÜ Tallinn	15
7	(Estonia) Reimo Oja	HÜJK Emmaste	15
7	(Japan) Kōsuke Usami	Nõmme Kalju II / Sillamäe Kalev II	15
10	(Estonia) Avetis Harutjunjan	Ararat TTÜ Tallinn	14

== Awards ==
Month	Manager of the Month		Player of the Month	
Month	Manager	Club	Player	Club
March	(Russia) Mikhail Artyukhov	Legion Tallinn	(Estonia) Vahur Vahtramäe	HÜJK Emmaste
April	(Estonia) Zaur Tšilingarašvili	Nõmme Kalju II	(Estonia) Andrei Antonov	Ararat TTÜ Tallinn
May	(Estonia) Marko Pärnpuu	HÜJK Emmaste	(Estonia) Jürgen Kuresoo	Elva
June	(Ukraine) Vadym Dobizha	Sillamäe Kalev II	(Estonia) Jürgen Kuresoo	Elva
July	(Estonia) Gert Olesk	Pärnu Linnameeskond	(Estonia) Henri Hanson	Pärnu Linnameeskond
August	(Estonia) Gert Olesk	Pärnu Linnameeskond	(Estonia) Erik Listmann	Nõmme Kalju II
September	(Estonia) Zaur Tšilingarašvili	Nõmme Kalju II	(Estonia) Maikel Astur	Flora III Tallinn
October	(Estonia) Viktor Neštšeretnõi	Dünamo Tallinn	(Estonia) Andrei Škaleta	Järve Kohtla-Järve

== See also ==
- 2013 Meistriliiga
- 2013 Esiliiga
- 2012–13 Estonian Cup
- 2013–14 Estonian Cup
