= 2015 Esiliiga B =

Estonian football league season for third division

Esiliiga B
- Season: 2015
- Champions: Starbunker (1st title)
- Promoted: Starbunker; Järve
- Relegated: Puuma; Ararat TTÜ; Flora III
- Matches: 180
- Goals: 629 (3.49 per match)
- Top goalscorer: Klimentiy Boldyrev (25 goals)
- Biggest home win: Starbunker 10–0 Ararat TTÜ (20 September 2015)
- Biggest away win: Ararat TTÜ 0–6 Järve (5 April 2015)
- Highest scoring: Sillamäe Kalev II 9–3 Ararat TTÜ (4 October 2015)
- Longest winning run: 7 games Starbunker
- Longest unbeaten run: 9 games Joker; Järve
- Longest winless run: 10 games Tallinna Kalev II; Flora III; Ararat TTÜ
- Longest losing run: 7 games Ararat TTÜ

The 2015 Esiliiga B was the 3rd season of the Esiliiga B, the third-highest Estonian league for association football clubs, since its establishment in 2013. The season started on 4 March 2015 and concluded on 8 November 2015.

Starbunker won the league, finishing with 81 points and were promoted to the Esiliiga. It was their first Esiliiga B title in history.

Järve finished 2nd and were promoted to the Esiliiga. Sillamäe Kalev II finished 3rd and qualified to the promotion play-offs but subsequently withdrew.

Puuma finished 8th and qualified to the relegation play-offs but were beaten by Welco 2–5 on aggregate and relegated to the II liiga. Ararat TTÜ and Flora III were the bottom two teams and were relegated to the II liiga.

== Teams ==
Locations of the 2015 Esiliiga B teams

=== Stadia ===
Team	Location	Stadium	Capacity
Ararat TTÜ	Tallinn	Sportland Arena	540
Elva	Elva	Elva Stadium	30
HÜJK Emmaste	Tallinn	A. Le Coq Arena I	150
Flora III	Tallinn	Sportland Arena	540
Järve	Kohtla-Järve	Kohtla-Järve Stadium	150
Joker	Raasiku	Raasiku Stadium	200
Puuma	Tallinn	Wismar Stadium	0
Sillamäe Kalev II	Sillamäe	Sillamäe Kalev Stadium	0
Starbunker	Maardu	Maardu Stadium	500
Tallinna Kalev II	Tallinn	Kalev Keskstaadion	270

=== Personnel and kits ===
Team	Manager	Captain	Kit manufacturer	Shirt sponsor
Ararat TTÜ	(Estonia) Ruben Arutjunov	(Estonia) Nikolai Pulkkinen	Nike	
Elva	(Estonia) Kaido Koppel	(Estonia) Jürgen Kuresoo	Nike	Sportland
HÜJK Emmaste	(Estonia) Urmas Kirs		Hummel	
Flora III	(Estonia) Pelle Pohlak		Nike	Tele2
Järve	(Estonia) Andrei Škaleta		Adidas	
Joker	(Estonia) Andre Ilves	(Estonia) Rene Lill	Joma	Unibox
Puuma	(Russia) Vitali Kobashov	(Estonia) Marko Truusalu	Adidas	
Sillamäe Kalev II	(Lithuania) Algimantas Briaunys		Uhlsport	Alexela
Starbunker	(Estonia) Andrei Borissov	(Estonia) Maksim Krivošein	Adidas	
Tallinna Kalev II	(Estonia) Daniel Meijel		Jako	Viking Line

=== Managerial changes ===
Team	Outgoing manager	Manner of departure	Date of vacancy	Position in table	Incoming manager	Date of appointment
HÜJK Emmaste	(Estonia) Marko Pärnpuu	Signed by Tallinna Kalev	25 November 2014	Pre-season	(Estonia) Urmas Kirs	1 January 2015
Ararat TTÜ	(Estonia) Vaagn Arutjunjan	Mutual consent	31 December 2014	Pre-season	(Estonia) Ruben Arutjunov	1 January 2015

== Results ==
=== League table ===
Pos	Team	Pld	W	D	L	GF	GA	GD	Pts	Promotion, qualification or relegation
1	Starbunker (C, P)	36	26	3	7	92	38	+54	81	Promotion to Esiliiga
2	Järve (P)	36	21	9	6	66	29	+37	72	Promotion to Esiliiga
3	Sillamäe Kalev II	36	19	6	11	73	57	+16	63	Qualification for the promotion play-offs
4	Elva	36	16	6	14	62	45	+17	54	
5	Joker	36	14	11	11	66	57	+9	53	
6	Tallinna Kalev II	36	14	8	14	60	55	+5	50	
7	HÜJK Emmaste	36	13	7	16	56	64	−8	46	
8	Puuma (R)	36	13	5	18	60	89	−29	44	Qualification for the relegation play-offs
9	Ararat TTÜ (R)	36	6	7	23	51	114	−63	25	Relegation to II liiga
10	Flora III (R)	36	4	6	26	43	81	−38	18	Relegation to II liiga

Source: Estonian Football Association (in Estonian)
Rules for classification: 1) Points; 2) Play-off (only if deciding champion); 3) Less matches awarded against; 4) Matches won; 5) Head-to-head points; 6) Head-to-head goal difference; 7) Goal difference; 8) Goals scored; 9) Away goals scored; 10) Fairplay ranking.
(C) Champions; (P) Promoted; (R) Relegated

=== Result tables ===
==== First half of the season ====
Home \ Away	ARA	ELV	EMM	FLO	JÄR	JOK	PUU	SIL	STA	TAL
Ararat TTÜ		0–3	0–4	0–3	0–6	0–3	0–2	2–1	4–4	3–3
Elva	1–3		2–0	2–0	1–0	1–1	0–2	1–2	0–2	5–0
HÜJK Emmaste	0–3	1–1		1–1	1–2	2–1	5–0	1–2	0–2	1–2
Flora III	4–7	0–1	0–3		1–4	1–2	3–4	1–1	1–2	3–0
Järve	0–0	0–0	3–0	2–1		2–0	0–1	1–2	1–0	1–0
Joker	1–4	1–3	2–2	2–1	0–1		6–5	1–1	0–1	4–2
Puuma	1–1	3–2	2–2	2–0	1–1	3–2		1–0	2–4	1–3
Sillamäe Kalev II	2–2	1–5	3–1	4–2	3–2	0–1	4–3		0–3	1–0
Starbunker	4–0	0–1	1–0	1–0	0–2 (Note: FA awarded Järve a win due to Starbunker fielding suspended player. The original match had ended in a 2–0 win for Järve.)	3–1	2–1	3–0		5–0
Tallinna Kalev II	2–0	1–1	1–3	2–0	0–0	3–0	3–3	1–2	1–3	

Source: Esiliiga B
Legend: Blue = home team win; Yellow = draw; Red = away team win.

==== Second half of the season ====
Home \ Away	ARA	ELV	EMM	FLO	JÄR	JOK	PUU	SIL	STA	KAL
Ararat TTÜ		0–2	1–2	0–4	1–4	2–2	1–2	3–2	1–6	1–2
Elva	0–0 (Note: FA awarded Elva a win after Ararat TTÜ forfeited the match.)		1–2	1–2	1–1	0–2	9–1	2–0	0–2	1–2
HÜJK Emmaste	7–3	3–2		2–1	1–1	1–3	3–1	0–4	2–4	1–5
Flora III	3–3	0–2	0–2		1–4	3–3	1–1	0–1	1–3	2–2
Järve	3–0	5–2	4–0	2–1		1–1	0–0 (Note: FA awarded Järve a win after Puuma forfeited the match.)	0–1 (Note: FA awarded Sillamäe Kalev II a win due to Järve fielding an ineligible player. The original match had ended in a 1–0 win for Sillamäe Kalev II.)	3–1	2–1
Joker	3–2	2–1	3–1	4–0	0–0		7–1	2–2	0–0	0–0
Puuma	3–1	0–3	0–1	1–0	1–3	1–4		2–3	3–4	0–2
Sillamäe Kalev II	9–3	2–2	1–1	3–2	0–1	5–1	6–1		2–4	1–0
Starbunker	10–0	1–2	2–0	3–0	4–0	1–1	2–3	1–0		1–4
Tallinna Kalev II	6–0	3–1	0–0	2–0	2–2	1–0	1–2	1–2	2–3	

Source: Esiliiga B
Legend: Blue = home team win; Yellow = draw; Red = away team win.

== Play-offs ==
=== Promotion play-offs ===
Sillamäe Kalev II, who finished 3rd, were supposed to face Santos, the 8th-placed 2015 Esiliiga side for a two-legged play-off. However, the play-offs were abandoned after Sillamäe Kalev II withdrew and Santos retained their Esiliiga spot for the 2016 season.

=== Relegation play-offs ===
Puuma, who finished 8th, faced Welco, the II liiga play-offs winner. The winner on aggregate score after both matches earned entry into the 2016 Esiliiga B. Welco won 5–2 on aggregate.

==== First leg ====
15 November 2015
16:00 (GMT+2)

Welco	5–0	Puuma
Savikink 16'; Lubi 23'; Kaasik 39'; Sillaots 49'; Valtna 71'	Report

Tartu Tamme Stadium, Tartu
Attendance: 100
Referee: Marko Liiva

==== Second leg ====
21 November 2015
13:00 (GMT+2)

Puuma	2–0	Welco
Tšernei 44'; Kartau 85'	Report

Wismar Stadium, Tallinn
Attendance: 62
Referee: Dmitri Kulikov

== Season statistics ==
=== Top scorers ===
Rank	Player	Club	Goals
1	(Ukraine) Klimentiy Boldyrev	Starbunker	25
2	(Estonia) Jürgen Kuresoo	Elva	23
3	(Estonia) Nikita Brõlin	Starbunker	18
4	(Estonia) Sergei Bilinski	Puuma	14
5	(Estonia) Kert Jõeäär	Tallinna Kalev II	12
5	(Estonia) Rene Lill	Joker	12
5	(Estonia) Aleksandr Volkov	Sillamäe Kalev II	12
8	(Russia) Emmanuel Gurtckaia	Sillamäe Kalev II	11
8	(Estonia) Ats Joandi	Elva	11
8	(Estonia) Ilja Zelentsov	Starbunker	11

== Awards ==
=== Monthly awards ===
Month	Manager of the Month		Player of the Month	
Month	Manager	Club	Player	Club
March	(Estonia) Kaido Koppel	Elva	(Estonia) Jürgen Kuresoo	Elva
April	(Estonia) Andrei Borissov	Starbunker	(Estonia) Kevin Kaivoja	Järve
May	(Estonia) Andre Ilves	Joker	(Estonia) Jürgen Kuresoo	Elva
June	(Estonia) Andrei Borissov	Starbunker	(Russia) Vlasiy Sinyavskiy	Puuma
July	(Estonia) Urmas Kirs	HÜJK Emmaste	(Estonia) Nikita Brõlin	Starbunker
August	(Estonia) Daniel Meijel	Tallinna Kalev II	(Estonia) Aleksei Tihhonov	Järve
September	(Estonia) Andrei Borissov	Starbunker	(Estonia) Rene Lill	Joker
October	(Russia) Aleksei Tikhomirov	Järve	(Estonia) Ott Reinike	Joker

=== Annual awards ===
==== Player of the Season ====
Jürgen Kuresoo was named Player of the Season.

== See also ==
- 2014–15 Estonian Cup
- 2015–16 Estonian Cup
- 2015 Meistriliiga
- 2015 Esiliiga
