= 2014 Esiliiga B =

Estonian football league season for third division

Esiliiga B
- Season: 2014
- Champions: Infonet II Tallinn
- Promoted: Infonet II Tallinn; Santos Tartu
- Relegated: Ararat TTÜ Tallinn; Flora III Tallinn; Legion Tallinn
- Matches played: 180
- Goals scored: 750 (4.17 per match)
- Top goalscorer: Yuriy Vereshchak (43 goals)
- Biggest home win: Santos Tartu 13–1 HÜJK Emmaste (18 September 2014)
- Biggest away win: Elva 0–7 Santos Tartu (1 June 2014)
- Highest scoring: Santos Tartu 13–1 HÜJK Emmaste (18 September 2014); Santos Tartu 12–2 Sillamäe Kalev II (28 September 2014)
- Longest winning run: Santos Tartu (24 games)
- Longest unbeaten run: Santos Tartu (24 games)
- Longest winless run: Järve Kohtla-Järve; Ararat TTÜ Tallinn; Flora III Tallinn; Legion Tallinn (8 games)
- Longest losing run: Järve Kohtla-Järve (7 games)

The 2014 Esiliiga was the 2nd season of the Esiliiga B. The season started on Friday 28 February 2014, and concluded on Sunday 9 November 2014. Infonet II Tallinn won the Esiliiga B, finishing with 99 points.

== Teams ==
=== Stadiums and locations ===
Location of the 2014 Esiliiga B teams

Team	Location	Stadium	Capacity
Ararat TTÜ Tallinn	Tallinn	Sportland Arena	800
Elva	Elva	Elva Stadium	1,500
Flora III Tallinn	Tallinn	Sportland Arena	800
HÜJK Emmaste	Tallinn	Männiku Stadium	1,000
Infonet II Tallinn	Tallinn	Sportland Arena	800
Järve Kohtla-Järve	Kohtla-Järve	Kohtla-Järve SPK Stadium	780
Legion Tallinn	Tallinn	Sportland Arena	800
Santos Tartu	Tartu	Tamme Stadium	2000
Sillamäe Kalev II	Sillamäe	Sillamäe Kalev Stadium	500
Starbunker Maardu	Maardu	Maardu Stadium	1500

=== Personnel and kits ===
Note: Flags indicate national team as has been defined under FIFA eligibility rules. Players and Managers may hold more than one non-FIFA nationality.

Team	Manager	Captain	Kit manufacturer	Shirt sponsor
Ararat TTÜ Tallinn	(Estonia) Vaagn Arutjunjan	(Estonia) Nikolai Pulkkinen	Nike	
Elva	(Estonia) Kaido Koppel		Nike	Sportland
Flora III Tallinn	(Estonia) Pelle Pohlak		Nike	
HÜJK Emmaste	(Estonia) Marko Pärnpuu	(Estonia) Vahur Vahtramäe	Hummel	
Infonet II Tallinn	(Estonia) Sergei Bragin		Joma	Infonet
Järve Kohtla-Järve	(Estonia) Andrei Škaleta			
Legion Tallinn	(Estonia) Viktor Passikuta			
Santos Tartu	(Lithuania) Algimantas Liubinskas	(Estonia) Taavi Vellemaa	Uhlsport	
Sillamäe Kalev II	(Lithuania) Algimantas Briaunys		Uhlsport	Alexela
Starbunker Maardu	(Estonia) Andrei Borissov			

=== Managerial changes ===
Team	Outgoing manager	Manner of departure	Date of vacancy	Position in table	Replaced by	Date of appointment
Flora III Tallinn	(Estonia) Dmitri Ustritski	Mutual agreement	7 January 2014	Pre-season	(Estonia) Pelle Pohlak	8 January 2014
Elva	(Estonia) Marek Naaris	Mutual agreement	29 January 2014	Pre-season	(Estonia) Kaido Koppel	29 January 2014
Santos Tartu	(Estonia) Mikk Laas	Mutual agreement	21 April 2014	2nd	(Lithuania) Algimantas Liubinskas	21 April 2014

== Results ==
=== League table ===
Pos	Team	Pld	W	D	L	GF	GA	GD	Pts	Promotion or relegation
1	Infonet II Tallinn (C, P)	36	32	3	1	124	34	+90	99	Promotion to Esiliiga
2	Santos Tartu (P)	36	32	0	4	161	27	+134	96	Promotion to Esiliiga
3	HÜJK Emmaste (E)	36	18	5	13	71	81	−10	59	Not playing in the promotion play-offs as they were denied a license
4	Sillamäe Kalev II	36	17	3	16	74	64	+10	54	
5	Starbunker Maardu	36	16	2	18	70	85	−15	50	
6	Elva	36	12	5	19	45	79	−34	41	
7	Järve Kohtla-Järve	36	11	4	21	53	77	−24	37	
8	Ararat TTÜ Tallinn (R)	36	9	5	22	55	80	−25	32	Qualification for the relegation play-offs
9	Flora III Tallinn (R)	36	8	3	25	44	112	−68	27	Relegation to II liiga
10	Legion Tallinn (R)	36	7	6	23	53	111	−58	27	Relegation to II liiga

Source: Estonian Football Association (in Estonian)
Rules for classification: Points; Least withdrawals or annulled matches; Overall wins; Head-to-head points; Head-to-head goal difference; Goal difference; Goals scored. If two or more teams on the top have the same number of points by the end of the season, the aforementioned rules will not apply and additional game(s) will be played to determine the champions.
(C) Champions; (E) Eliminated; (P) Promoted; (R) Relegated

=== Promotion play-off ===
HÜJK Emmaste voluntarily declined joining Esiliiga and remained in Esiliiga B.

HÜJK Emmaste	v	Tarvas Rakvere

Tarvas Rakvere	v	HÜJK Emmaste

=== Relegation play-offs ===
Ararat TTÜ Tallinn, who finished 8th, faced Joker 1993 Raasiku, the II liiga play-off winners, for a two-legged play-off. The winner on aggregate score after both matches will earn a spot in the 2015 Esiliiga B. Joker 1993 Raasiku won 7–7 on aggregate.

16 November 2014	Joker 1993 Raasiku	3–1	Ararat TTÜ Tallinn	Raasiku
13:00 (UTC+3)	Võsar 31'; Lill 53'; Randjõe 66'	Report	Antonov 14'	Stadium: Raasiku Stadium; Attendance: 135; Referee: Mart Martin

22 November 2014	Ararat TTÜ Tallinn	6–4	Joker 1993 Raasiku	Tallinn
13:00 (UTC+3)	Antonov 16', 45+1'; Novikov 24'; Parkala 35'; Belozjorov 73'; Arutjunjan 81'	Report	Võsar 29'; Lill 31', 34', 74'	Stadium: Sportland Arena; Attendance: 62; Referee: Joonas Jaanovits

== Season statistics ==
=== Top goalscorers ===
As of 9 November 2014.

Rank	Player	Club	Goals
1	(Ukraine) Yuriy Vereshchak	Santos Tartu	43
2	(Estonia) Aleksandr Volkov	Sillamäe Kalev II	30
3	(Estonia) Taavi Vellemaa	Santos Tartu	25
4	(Estonia) Timo Teniste	Santos Tartu	20
5	(Estonia) Reimo Oja	HÜJK Emmaste	19
6	(Estonia) Eduard Golovljov	Infonet II Tallinn	17
6	(Estonia) Jürgen Kuresoo	Elva	17
8	(Ukraine) Klimentiy Boldyrev	Starbunker Maardu	14
9	(Estonia) Jevgeni Gurtšioglujants	Infonet II Tallinn	12
10	(Estonia) Rain Aasmäe	Starbunker Maardu	10
10	(Estonia) Rauf-Roman Mikailov	Legion Tallinn	10
10	(Estonia) Margo Parkala	Ararat TTÜ Tallinn	10
10	(Estonia) Juhan Jograf Siim	Flora III Tallinn	10

== Awards ==
Month	Manager of the Month		Player of the Month	
Month	Manager	Club	Player	Club
March	(Estonia) Sergei Bragin	Infonet II Tallinn	(Estonia) Aleksandr Volkov	Sillamäe Kalev II
April	(Estonia) Sergei Bragin	Infonet II Tallinn	(Estonia) Rauf-Roman Mikailov	Legion Tallinn
May	(Estonia) Sergei Bragin	Infonet II Tallinn	(Estonia) Timo Teniste	Santos Tartu
June	(Estonia) Andrei Borissov	Starbunker Maardu	(Estonia) Taavi Vellemaa	Santos Tartu
July	(Estonia) Andrei Škaleta	Järve Kohtla-Järve	(Estonia) Ilja Zelentsov	Starbunker Maardu
August	(Estonia) Marko Pärnpuu	HÜJK Emmaste	(Estonia) Eduard Golovljov	Infonet II Tallinn
September	(Estonia) Sergei Bragin	Infonet II Tallinn	(Ukraine) Yuriy Vereshchak	Santos Tartu
October	(Ukraine) Oleh Boychyshyn	Santos Tallinn	(Russia) Viktor Gusev	Järve Kohtla-Järve

== See also ==
- 2013–14 Estonian Cup
- 2014–15 Estonian Cup
- 2014 Meistriliiga
- 2014 Esiliiga
