= 2007–08 Estonian Cup =

Estonian football competition

Eesti Karikas

Tournament details
- Country: Estonia
- Teams: 71

Final positions
- Champions: Flora
- Runners-up: Maag Tammeka

Tournament statistics
- Matches played: 70
- Goals scored: 375 (5.36 per match)

The 2007–08 Estonian Cup (Estonian: Eesti Karikas) was the 18th season of the Estonian football knockout tournament. Winners of the cup qualified for the 2008–09 UEFA Cup second qualifying round. The defending champion, Levadia, was knocked out in the semi-final in a penalty shoot-out against Flora.

The competition culminated with the final held at Kadriorg Stadium, Tallinn on 13 May 2008 with Flora taking the title 3–1. It was broadcast by Kalev Sport.

All in all, 71 teams took part of the competition.

== First round ==
Only seven games were played in the first round, to take the number of teams down from 71 to 64, other 57 teams got byes. Two teams from Meistriliiga – TVMK Tallinn (winners in 2003, 2006; finalists in 2004, 2005) and Tulevik Viljandi (finalists in 1999; 2000) – started their journey from early on.

11 July 2007	Lasnamäe Ajax II	1–3	TVMK	Tallinn
18:00				Stadium: FC Ajax Stadium; Attendance: 35; Referee: Ainar Kuusk

18 July 2007	Kaitseliit	4–3	Elva II	Alu
19:00				Stadium: Alu staadion Referee: Taavi Tüvist

24 July 2007	Välk 494	5–2	Metec	Tartu
18:00				Stadium: Annelinna kunstmuruväljak Attendance: 70

24 July 2007	Olympic	0–1	Quattromed	Tallinn
18:00				Stadium: Wismari staadion Referee: Aaron Härsing

24 July 2007	Tulevik	3–1	Atletik	Viljandi
19:30				Stadium: Viljandi linnastaadion Attendance: 80; Referee: Silver Kõiv

25 July 2007	Kalev II	0–6	Ararat	Tallinn
18:00				Stadium: Kalevi kunstmuruväljak

25 July 2007	Tabasalu	2–1	Järva-Jaani	Tabasalu
				Stadium: Tabasalu staadion

== Second round ==
Team 1	Score	Team 2
7 August
Saue	0–4	Kuressaare
Nõmme Kalju II	4–2	Soccernet
HÜJK	4–1	Eston Villa
Enter	6–1	Tapa
Warrior II	1–2	Ganvix
Lasnamäe Ajax	9–1	WC Guwalda
Atli	1–0	Kaitseliit Kalev
Võru	3–7	Lootos
Toompea 1994	0–5	Püsivus
8 August
TVMK	2–1	Ararat
9 August
Kristiine	0–3	Elva
Flora U21	9–0	Trummi
Hansa United	0–6	Haiba
Narva JK Trans II	6–1	Virumaa
Välk 494 Tartu	7–1	Jalgpallihaigla
Rada	3–5 (a.e.t.)	Tulevik II
Nõmme Kalju	3–2 (a.e.t.)	Sillamäe Kalev
Eurouniv	0–5	Tamme Auto
14 August
Quattromed	0–8	Flora
Otepää	1–2	Maag Tammeka III
Narva Trans	14–0	Ühinenud Depood
Flora Paide LM	2–4	Vaprus
Piraaja	1–6	Tulevik
EBS Team	2–1	Tempori
15 August
Esteve	8–0	Tallinn United
Tabasalu	7–1	Reaal
Operi	0–3	Maag Tammeka
Lelle	1–3	Warrior
23 August
Twister	0–5	ESK Sport
Klooga	1–17	Maag Tammeka II
28 August
Levadia	11–0	Anži
Rock & Roll Tartu	0–6	Tallinna Kalev

== Third round ==
Team 1	Score	Team 2
4 September
EBS Team	0–4	Tabasalu
5 September
Levadia	6–0	Warrior
Atli	0–1	Maag Tammeka II
HÜJK	2–3 (a.e.t.)	Esteve
6 September
Tamme Auto	0–2	TVMK
Püsivus	1–4	Tulevik II
Kuressaare	0–5	Narva Trans
Välk 494 Tartu	8–1	Lootos
11 September
Trans II	1–1 (a.e.t.) (5–4 p)	Lasnamäe Ajax
Nõmme Kalju II	2–3	Elva
13 September
Ganvix	3–1	Enter
18 September
Maag Tammeka III	7–0	Haiba
25 September
Tulevik	1–2	Tallinna Kalev
ESK Sport	0–10	Flora
26 September
Maag Tammeka	3–2 (a.e.t.)	Nõmme Kalju
24 October
Vaprus	1–3	Flora U21

== Fourth round ==
30 October 2007	Flora	6–0	Tabasalu	Tallinn
18:45				Stadium: Lilleküla Stadium; Attendance: 170; Referee: Ainar Kuusk

30 October 2007	Levadia	4–1	Maag Tammeka III	Tallinn
18:45				Stadium: Maarjamäe kunstmuruväljak Attendance: 50; Referee: Ain Karutoom

30 October 2007	Tallinna Kalev	1–0	Trans II	Tallinn
18:45				Stadium: Kalevi kunstmuruväljak Attendance: 70; Referee: Silver Kõiv

30 October 2007	TVMK	1–3	Maag Tammeka	Tallinn
18:45				Stadium: Lasnamäe KJH kunstmuruväljak Attendance: 30; Referee: Hannes Kaasik

31 October 2007	Narva Trans	9–1	Esteve	Narva
18:45				Stadium: Kalevi kunstmuruväljak Attendance: 25; Referee: Mart Martin

31 October 2007	Santos (as Välk 494 Tartu)	3–1	Tulevik II	Tartu
19:00				Stadium: Annelinna kunstmuruväljak Attendance: 45; Referee: Eiko Saar

1 November 2007	Maag Tammeka II	4–0	Ganvix	Tartu
18:45				Stadium: Annelinna kunstmuruväljak Attendance: 45; Referee: Bruno Rammo

7 November 2007	Elva	1–8	Flora U21	Tallinn
18:45				Stadium: Sportland Arena; Attendance: 10; Referee: Boriss Šipunov

== Quarter-finals ==
Four teams from Tallinn got through to the quarter-finals, including the defending champion Levadia. Three clubs from Tartu and one from Narva were also represented.

The win by Flora II was a bit unexpected, but as they had played well in the previous rounds, it was really no big surprise that they overcame the Meistriliiga side. Maag Tammeka had no problem defeating Santos, the only club from the second division. While the main team were victorious, Maag Tammeka's reserve team lost to Flora, conceding two goals in the first eight minutes and two more later in the game. The only game containing both teams from the Top Division culminated with an easy victory for Levadia against 2001 cup-winner Trans.

15 April 2008	Levadia	3–1	Narva Trans	Tallinn
18:00	Zelinski 2'; Andreev 44', 57'		Lõsanov 74'	Stadium: Kadrioru staadion Attendance: 150; Referee: Hannes Kaasik

16 April 2008	Maag Tammeka II	1–4	Flora	Tartu
17:00	Perlin 58'		Post 7'; Anier 8', 71'; Hurt 57'	Stadium: Annelinna kunstmuruväljak Attendance: 125; Referee: Urmo Visnapuu

16 April 2008	Tallinna Kalev	1–3	Flora U21	Tallinn
18:45	Tikenberg 37'		Reinsoo 58' (pen.); Toomet 76'; Kallaste 85'	Stadium: Kalevi kunstmuruväljak Attendance: 90; Referee: Kristo Tohver

16 April 2008	Santos^{†}	0–3	Maag Tammeka	Tartu
19:45			Ossipov 23'; Starovoitov 52'; Prosa 82'	Stadium: Annelinna kunstmuruväljak Attendance: 170; Referee: Raivo Lattik

†–Välk 494 Tartu changed their name to FC Santos Tartu.

== Semi-finals ==
29 April 2008	Flora	1–1 (a.e.t.) (4–1 p)	Levadia	Tallinn
18:45	Kasimir 13'		Malov 85'	Stadium: Lilleküla Stadium; Attendance: 350; Referee: Silver Kõiv
	Penalties
	Hakola (penalty scored); Zahovaiko (penalty scored); Sidorenkov (penalty scored); Vunk (penalty scored)		(penalty missed) Nahk; (penalty scored) Kink; (penalty missed) Leitan

30 April 2008	Flora U21	0–3	Maag Tammeka	Tallinn
18:00			Starovoitov 4', 15', 17'	Stadium: Lilleküla Stadium; Attendance: 150; Referee: Margus Kotter

== Final ==
The clear favourite, Flora Tallinn, having won the competition twice before, in 1995 and 1997, attended the final for the sixth time. The underdog, Maag Tammeka Tartu, played in their first cup final, while also being only the second team from Tartu to reach that stage of the competition.

13 May 2008	Flora	3–1	Maag Tammeka	Tallinn
18:45	Post 1'; Hakola 47' (pen.), 64'; Aksalu (red card) 69'		Ossipov 72' (pen.) (yellow card) 90+1' (red card)	Stadium: Kadrioru staadion Attendance: 500; Referee: Hannes Kaasik

== Top goalscorers ==
Position	Player	Club	Goals
1	(Estonia) Alo Dupikov	Flora U21	9
2	(Estonia) Mario Hansi	Maag Tammeka II	6
2	(Russia) Vladislav Ivanov	Narva Trans	6
2	(Estonia) Robert Pluum	Santos	6
2	(Estonia) Tõnis Starkopf	Esteve	6
5	(Estonia) Mikk Laas	Maag Tammeka III	5
5	(Russia) Dmitri Lipartov	Narva Trans	5
5	(Estonia) Sander Post	Flora	5
5	(Estonia) Sergei Starovoitov	Maag Tammeka	5
5	(Estonia) Denis Šerikov	Maag Tammeka II	5
5	(Estonia) Aleksandr Tarassenkov	Narva Trans	5
