= 2017 Esiliiga =

Estonian football league season for second division

Esiliiga
- Season: 2017
- Promoted: Kuressaare; Tallinna Kalev
- Top goalscorer: Vitali Gussev (38 goals)
- Biggest home win: Santos 6–0 Elva (14 April 2017)
- Biggest away win: Tarvas 0–6 Flora U21 (11 March 2017)
- Highest scoring: Flora U21 6–2 Elva (6 April 2017); Maardu LM 6–2 Santos (27 May 2017)
- Longest winning run: 6 matches Flora U21
- Longest unbeaten run: 11 matches Flora U21
- Longest winless run: 13 matches Welco
- Longest losing run: 10 matches Elva

The 2017 Esiliiga is the 27th season of the Esiliiga, second-highest Estonian league for association football clubs, since its establishment in 1992. The season began on 2 March 2017.

== Teams ==
A total of 10 teams are contesting the league, including 6 sides from the 2016 season, one relegated from the 2016 Meistriliiga and three promoted from the 2016 Esiliiga B.

=== Stadia ===
Locations of the 2016 Esiliiga teams

Team	Location	Stadium	Capacity
Elva	Elva	Elva linnastaadion	600
FCI Tallinn U21	Tallinn	Infonet Lasnamäe Stadium	500
Flora U21	Tallinn	Flora Lilleküla Stadium	200
Kuressaare	Kuressaare	Kuressaare linnastaadion	1,000
Levadia U21	Tallinn	Maarjamäe Stadium	30
Maardu Linnameeskond	Maardu	Maardu linnastaadion	500
Santos	Tartu	Tartu Tamme Stadium	1,500
Tallinna Kalev	Tallinn	Kalevi Keskstaadion artificial turf	570
Tarvas	Rakvere	Rakvere linnastaadion	1,829
Welco	Tartu	Tartu Tamme Stadium	1,500

=== Personnel and kits ===
Team	Manager	Captain	Kit manufacturer	Shirt sponsor
Elva	(Estonia) Veiko Haan	(Estonia) Jürgen Kuresoo	Nike	Sportland
FCI Tallinn U21	(Estonia) Aleksei Kapustin	(Estonia) Artjom Rõžkov	Joma	Infonet
Flora U21	(Estonia) Joel Indermitte	(Estonia) Romet Ridamäe	Nike	Tele2
Kuressaare	(Estonia) Sander Viira	(Estonia) Elari Valmas	Joma	Saaremaa Lihatööstus
Levadia U21	(Estonia) Vladimir Vassiljev	(Estonia) Alex Roosalu	Adidas	Viimsi Keevitus
Maardu Linnameeskond	(Estonia) Andrei Borissov	(Estonia) Maksim Krivošein	Adidas	
Santos	(Estonia) Janar Sagim	(Estonia) Joonas Kartsep	Adidas	
Tallinna Kalev	(Estonia) Marko Pärnpuu	(Estonia) Ando Hausenberg	Nike	
Tarvas	(Estonia) Urmas Kirs	(Estonia) Taavi Trasberg	Nike	Aqva Hotel & Spa
Welco	(Estonia) Siim Valtna	(Estonia) Mikk Valtna	Nike	Liisi

=== Managerial changes ===
Team	Outgoing manager	Manner of departure	Date of vacancy	Position in table	Incoming manager	Date of appointment
Elva	(Estonia) Kaido Koppel	Signed by Tammeka	29 November 2016	Pre-season	(Estonia) Veiko Haan	1 January 2017
FCI Tallinn U21	(Estonia) Sergei Bragin	Appointed as assistant manager of FCI Tallinn	13 February 2017	Pre-season	(Estonia) Aleksei Kapustin	13 February 2017
Santos	(Estonia) Siim Säesk	Mutual consent	22 September 2017	8th	(Estonia) Janar Sagim	22 September 2017

== Results ==
=== League table ===
Pos	Team	Pld	W	D	L	GF	GA	GD	Pts	Promotion, qualification or relegation
1	Maardu Linnameeskond (C)	36	24	5	7	92	44	+48	77	Promotion to the Meistriliiga
2	Tallinna Kalev (P)	36	24	2	10	95	44	+51	74	Qualification for the promotion play-offs
3	Tarvas	36	21	4	11	66	57	+9	67	
4	Flora U21 (Note: Reserve teams are ineligible for promotion.)	36	21	4	11	75	42	+33	67	
5	Kuressaare (P)	36	17	4	15	70	63	+7	55	
6	Levadia U21	36	13	6	17	56	60	−4	45	
7	FCI Tallinn U21	36	13	4	19	60	85	−25	43	
8	Santos	36	13	4	19	75	74	+1	43	Qualification for the relegation play-offs
9	Elva	36	9	2	25	40	90	−50	29	Relegation to Esiliiga B
10	Welco	36	4	7	25	30	100	−70	19	Relegation to Esiliiga B

Updated to match(es) played on 5 November 2017. Source: soccerway (in English), Esiliiga (in Estonian)
Rules for classification: 1) Points; 2) Play-off (only if deciding champion); 3) Less matches awarded against; 4) Matches won; 5) Head-to-head points; 6) Head-to-head goal difference; 7) Goal difference; 8) Goals scored; 9) Away goals scored; 10) Fairplay ranking.
(C) Champions; (P) Promoted

=== Result tables ===
==== First half of the season ====
Home \ Away	ELV	FLO	FCI	KUR	LEV	MAA	SAN	KLV	TAR	WEL
Elva		1–2	0–1	0–1	0–3	4–3	4–1	0–1	0–4	1–1
Flora U21	6–2		3–1	2–2	0–2	1–1	3–0	3–0	4–0 (Note: FA awarded Rakvere JK Tarvas a win due to FC Flora U21 fielding too many players, who were born in 1995 or before. The original match had ended in a 4–0 win for FC Flora U21.)	5–0
FCI Tallinn U21	2–0	0–5		3–3	2–0	1–2	5–1	3–2	3–4	5–0
Kuressaare	4–0	0–2	5–0		4–0	1–4	3–2	0–1	1–2	2–2
Levadia U21	2–1	0–1	1–2	0–0		1–2	0–1	3–4	0–0	3–1
Maardu	1–2	1–0	1–1	5–1	2–3		6–2	3–2	1–0 (Note: FA awarded Rakvere JK Tarvas a win due to Maardu Linnameeskond fielding an ineligible player. The original match had ended in a 1–0 win for Maardu Linnameeskond.)	5–1
Santos	6–0	0–0	1–2	1–4	5–0	3–4		1–2	2–0	0–0
Tallinna Kalev	2–0	1–1	3–0	1–2	1–4	0–1	4–1		1–0	3–0
Tarvas	2–0	0–6	2–1	2–1	4–1	3–4	1–5	1–1		4–0
Welco	1–0	0–3	2–2	1–3	1–1	1–1	0–0	1–5	1–3	

Updated to match(es) played on 20 July 2017. Source: Esiliiga
Legend: Blue = home team win; Yellow = draw; Red = away team win.

==== Second half of the season ====
Home \ Away	ELV	FLO	FCI	KUR	LEV	MAA	SAN	KLV	TAR	WEL
Elva		2–0	1–2	1–2	0–3	1–1	0–3	0–5	0–2	2–0
Flora U21	2–1		4–2	0–2	0–4	2–0	1–3 (Note: FA awarded FC Santos Tartu a win due to FC Flora U21 fielding an ineligible player. The original match had ended in a 0–3 win for Santos Tartu.)	4–3	3–0	3–1
FCI Tallinn U21	0–3	1–2		1–3	2–5	0–3	1–4	0–5	0–2	4–0
Kuressaare	2–4	0–2	2–6		4–1	0–1	4–1	3–4	3–2	0–2
Levadia U21	2–5	2–0	2–0	2–3		1–3	1–0	0–2	1–1	4–0
Maardu	3–0	4–1	2–3	2–1	2–2		5–1	2–1	4–1	4–0
Santos	6–1	2–3	1–3	2–0	1–1	1–3		4–5	6–1	4–1
Tallinna Kalev	8–0	3–2	6–0	1–2	2–0	1–2	2–0		3–0	4–1
Tarvas	5–1	1–0	1–1	3–0	2–1	1–0	3–1	0–3		5–2
Welco	1–3	0–4	4–0	0–2	2–0	0–5	2–3	0–3	1–4	

Updated to match(es) played on 5 November 2017. Source: Esiliiga
Legend: Blue = home team win; Yellow = draw; Red = away team win.

== Season statistics ==
=== Top scorers ===
Rank	Player	Club	Goals
1	(Estonia) Vitali Gussev	Maardu Linnameeskond	38
2	(Estonia) Alex Meinhard	Santos	22
3	(Estonia) Andre Järva	Tallinna Kalev	21
4	(Estonia) Eduard Golovljov	FCI Tallinn U21	20
4	(Estonia) Karl Rudolf Õigus	Santos	20
6	(Estonia) Joonas Ljaš	Tarvas	19
7	(Estonia) Sander Laht	Kuressaare	17
8	(Estonia) Mario Stern	Kuressaare	15
9	(Estonia) Artur Makarov	Tallinna Kalev	13
9	(Estonia) Erik Sorga	Flora U21	13

== Awards ==
=== Monthly awards ===
Month	Manager of the Month		Player of the Month	
Month	Manager	Club	Player	Club
March	(Estonia) Joel Indermitte	Flora U21	(Estonia) Mario Stern	Kuressaare
April	(Estonia) Marko Pärnpuu	Tallinna Kalev	(Estonia) Nikita Brõlin	Maardu Linnameeskond
May	(Estonia) Aleksei Kapustin	FCI Tallinn U21	(Estonia) Sergei Akimov	Tarvas
June	(Estonia) Urmas Kirs	Tarvas	(Estonia) Nikita Brõlin	Maardu Linnameeskond
July	(Estonia) Veiko Haan	Elva	(Estonia) Joonas Ljaš	Tarvas
August	(Estonia) Martti Pukk	Kuressaare	(Estonia) Andre Järva	Tallinna Kalev
September	(Estonia) Marko Pärnpuu	Tallinna Kalev	(Estonia) Vitali Gussev	Maardu Linnameeskond
October	(Estonia) Andrei Borissov	Maardu Linnameeskond	(Estonia) Henri Järvelaid	Flora U21

=== Esiliiga Player of the Year ===
Vitali Gussev was named Esiliiga Player of the Year.

== See also ==
- 2016–17 Estonian Cup
- 2017–18 Estonian Cup
- 2017 Meistriliiga
- 2017 Esiliiga B
