= 2016 Esiliiga =

Estonian football league season for second division

Esiliiga
- Season: 2016
- Champions: Tulevik (1st title)
- Promoted: Tulevik
- Relegated: Nõmme Kalju U21; Vaprus; Järve
- Matches played: 180
- Goals scored: 717 (3.98 per match)
- Top goalscorer: Eduard Golovljov (39 goals)
- Biggest home win: Levadia U21 10–0 Vaprus (21 August 2016); Infonet II 10–0 Järve (18 September 2016)
- Biggest away win: Vaprus 1–6 Levadia U21 (22 May 2016); Flora U21 0–5 Levadia U21 (9 September 2016)
- Highest scoring: Levadia U21 10–0 Vaprus (21 August 2016); Infonet II 10–0 Järve (18 September 2016)
- Longest winning run: 9 matches Tulevik
- Longest unbeaten run: 14 matches Tulevik
- Longest winless run: 11 matches Nõmme Kalju U21
- Longest losing run: 8 matches Nõmme Kalju U21

The 2016 Esiliiga is the 26th season of the Esiliiga, second-highest Estonian league for association football clubs, since its establishment in 1992. The season began on 25 February 2016 and concluded on 6 November 2016.

Tulevik won the league, finishing with 89 points and were promoted to the Meistriliiga. It was their first Esiliiga title in history.

== Teams ==
=== Stadia ===
Locations of the 2016 Esiliiga teams

Team	Location	Stadium	Capacity
Flora U21	Tallinn	A. Le Coq Arena	10,340
Infonet II	Tallinn	Infonet Lasnamäe Stadium	400
Järve	Kohtla-Järve	Kohtla-Järve SPK Stadium	150
Levadia U21	Tallinn	Maarjamäe Stadium	30
Maardu Linnameeskond	Maardu	Maardu Stadium	500
Nõmme Kalju U21	Tallinn	Hiiu Stadium	330
Santos	Tartu	Tamme Stadium	1,750
Tallinna Kalev	Tallinn	Kalev Keskstaadion	11,500
Tulevik	Viljandi	Viljandi Stadium	1,068
Vaprus	Vändra	Vändra Stadium	307

=== Personnel and kits ===
Team	Manager	Captain	Kit manufacturer	Shirt sponsor
Flora U21	(Estonia) Joel Indermitte	(Estonia) Tõnu Paavo	Nike	Tele2
Infonet II	(Estonia) Sergei Bragin		Joma	Infonet
Järve	(Russia) Aleksei Tikhomirov	(Russia) Mikhail Kharitanovich	Adidas	Euronics
Levadia U21	(Estonia) Vladimir Vassiljev		Adidas	Viimsi Keevitus
Maardu Linnameeskond	(Estonia) Andrei Borissov	(Estonia) Maksim Krivošein	Adidas	
Nõmme Kalju U21	(Estonia) Zaur Tšilingarašvili		Adidas	Optibet
Santos	(Estonia) Siim Säesk	(Estonia) Taavi Vellemaa	Uhlsport	Värska
Tallinna Kalev	(Estonia) Marko Pärnpuu	(Estonia) Ando Hausenberg	Jako	ViisTek Media
Tulevik	(Estonia) Aivar Lillevere	(Estonia) Tanel Lang	Joma	Viljandi Aken ja Uks
Vaprus	(Estonia) Ranet Lepik	(Estonia) Karel Otto	Macron	Møller Auto Pärnu

=== Managerial changes ===
Team	Outgoing manager	Manner of departure	Date of vacancy	Position in table	Incoming manager	Date of appointment
Flora U21	(Estonia) Jürgen Henn	Signed by Flora	21 December 2015	Pre-season	(Estonia) Joel Indermitte	21 December 2015
Järve	(Estonia) Andrei Škaleta	Mutual consent	31 December 2015	Pre-season	(Russia) Aleksei Tikhomirov	1 January 2016
Levadia U21	(Estonia) Argo Arbeiter	Signed by Flora	13 July 2016	5th	(Estonia) Vladimir Vassiljev	14 July 2016

== Results ==
=== League table ===
Pos	Team	Pld	W	D	L	GF	GA	GD	Pts	Promotion, qualification or relegation
1	Tulevik (C, P)	36	28	5	3	106	38	+68	89	Promotion to Meistriliiga
2	Flora U21 (Note: Reserve teams are ineligible for promotion.)	36	20	8	8	78	47	+31	68	
3	Infonet II	36	18	2	16	98	81	+17	56	
4	Maardu Linnameeskond	36	16	6	14	83	75	+8	54	Qualification for the promotion play-offs
5	Levadia U21	36	15	5	16	81	69	+12	50	
6	Santos	36	16	1	19	63	70	−7	49	
7	Tallinna Kalev	36	13	6	17	56	58	−2	45	
8	Nõmme Kalju U21 (R)	36	12	5	19	62	86	−24	41	Qualification for the relegation play-offs
9	Vaprus (R)	36	8	8	20	48	96	−48	32	Relegation to the Esiliiga B
10	Järve (R)	36	8	6	22	42	97	−55	30	Relegation to the Esiliiga B

Updated to match(es) played on unknown. Source: Esiliiga (in Estonian)
Rules for classification: 1) Points; 2) Play-off (only if deciding champion); 3) Less matches awarded against; 4) Matches won; 5) Head-to-head points; 6) Head-to-head goal difference; 7) Goal difference; 8) Goals scored; 9) Away goals scored; 10) Fairplay ranking.
(C) Champions; (P) Promoted; (R) Relegated

=== Result tables ===
==== First half of the season ====
Home \ Away	FLO	INF	JÄR	LEV	MAA	KLJ	SAN	KLV	TUL	VÄN
Flora U21		2–1	6–0	4–1	5–2	3–2	0–1	2–0	0–2	3–1
Infonet II	2–4		6–1	2–1	5–0	2–0	6–2	2–3	1–5	4–1
Järve	0–1	0–4		3–4	1–0	3–5	1–2	3–2	1–2	2–2
Levadia U21	0–3	2–0	4–0		1–3	2–0	3–2	1–2	1–1	1–5
Maardu	1–1	5–1	7–1	3–4		3–0	3–0	2–1	2–2	3–0
Nõmme Kalju U21	2–2	2–3	2–2	2–2	1–3		2–1	1–2	1–3	0–3
Santos	1–0	5–2	0–1	1–5	4–5	4–1		1–3	2–3	2–0
Tallinna Kalev	1–1	2–3	2–1	0–1	0–0	6–0	1–3		1–2	2–0
Tulevik	0–0	1–2	0–1	3–2	3–2	6–1	4–1	3–3		2–1
Vaprus	1–1	1–3	1–1	1–6	2–2	2–0	1–0	3–2	0–1	

Source: Esiliiga
Legend: Blue = home team win; Yellow = draw; Red = away team win.

==== Second half of the season ====
Home \ Away	FLO	INF	JÄR	LEV	MAA	KLJ	SAN	KLV	TUL	VÄN
Flora U21		2–4	3–1	0–5	4–1	2–1	2–0	2–2	0–2	7–1
Infonet II	3–3		2–2	1–3	1–5	2–1	3–2	5–0	2–3	10–0
Järve	1–2	4–2		2–0	2–2	1–2	3–2	1–2	0–2	1–3
Levadia U21	1–3	0–2	10–0		2–5	0–0	1–3	1–1	2–3	1–3
Maardu	1–3	4–2	5–0	1–2		0–4	0–1	2–1	2–6	4–1
Nõmme Kalju U21	3–2	4–3	1–2	3–2	1–1		2–1	3–1	0–4	8–1
Santos	1–0	3–2	2–0	3–2	4–0	2–3		2–0	0–2	2–2
Tallinna Kalev	1–2	3–2	1–0	0–1	1–0	2–3	4–0		0–2	4–0
Tulevik	1–3	4–1	6–0	2–2	6–1	5–0	2–0	3–0		4–0
Vaprus	0–0	1–2	0–0	2–5	2–3	3–1	1–3	0–0	3–6	

Source: Esiliiga
Legend: Blue = home team win; Yellow = draw; Red = away team win.

== Play-offs ==
=== Promotion play-offs ===
Maardu Linnameeskond, who finished 4th, faced Pärnu Linnameeskond, the 9th-placed 2016 Meistriliiga side for a two-legged play-off. The winner on aggregate score after both matches earned entry into the 2017 Meistriliiga.

==== First leg ====
12 November 2016
13:00 (UTC+2)

Maardu Linnameeskond	1–5	Pärnu Linnameeskond
Zelentsov 59' (pen.)	Report	Aristov 8' (o.g.); Saarts 30', 54'; Tutk 45'; Vihmoja 71'

Maardu artificial turf, Maardu
Referee: Juri Frischer

==== Second leg ====
19 November 2016
13:00 (UTC+2)

Pärnu Linnameeskond	4–3	Maardu Linnameeskond
Saarts 22'; Boldyrev 37' (o.g.); Pärnat 43'; Vunk 88'	Report	Abdullajev 27'; Krivošein 53'; Zelentsov 89'

Pärnu artificial turf, Pärnu
Referee: Kristo Tohver

Pärnu Linnameeskond won 9–4 on aggregate and retained their Meistriliiga spot for the 2017 season.

=== Relegation play-offs ===
Nõmme Kalju U21, who finished 8th, faced Welco, 3rd-placed 2016 Esiliiga B side for a two-legged play-off. The first leg originally ended 3–2 to Nõmme Kalju U21 but they were later ruled to have forfeited the match after fielding an ineligible player Henrik Pürg. According to the rules, the second leg was cancelled and Welco earned entry into the 2017 Esiliiga.

==== First leg ====
12 November 2016
14:00 (UTC+2)

Welco	2–0 Awarded	Nõmme Kalju U21
Reinberg 10'; Kaasik 52'	Report

Annelinn Stadium, Tartu
Referee: Kristo Külljastinen

==== Second leg ====
19 November 2016
13:00 (UTC+2)

Nõmme Kalju U21	Match cancelled	Welco

Hiiu Stadium, Tallinn

== Season statistics ==
=== Top goalscorers ===
Rank	Player	Club	Goals
1	(Estonia) Eduard Golovljov	Infonet II	39
2	(Estonia) Vitali Gussev	Maardu Linnameeskond	31
3	(Estonia) Kristen Kähr	Tulevik	22
4	(Estonia) Peeter Klein	Nõmme Kalju U21	20
5	(Estonia) Erik Sorga	Flora U21	17
6	(Estonia) Sander Post	Tulevik	16
7	(Estonia) Alex Meinhard	Santos	14
8	(Estonia) Aleksei Belov	Tallinna Kalev	13
8	(Estonia) Indrek Ilves	Tulevik	13
8	(Estonia) Nikita Koger	Levadia U21	13
8	(Estonia) Edgar Tur	Infonet II	13

== Awards ==
=== Monthly awards ===
Month	Manager of the Month		Player of the Month	
Month	Manager	Club	Player	Club
March	(Estonia) Joel Indermitte	Flora U21	(Estonia) Daniil Savitski	Tallinna Kalev
April	(Estonia) Sergei Bragin	Infonet II	(Estonia) Ranet Lepik	Vaprus
May	(Estonia) Aivar Lillevere	Tulevik	(Estonia) Nikita Brõlin	Maardu Linnameeskond
June/July	(Estonia) Aivar Lillevere	Tulevik	(Estonia) Vitali Gussev	Maardu Linnameeskond
August	(Estonia) Zaur Tšilingarašvili	Nõmme Kalju U21	(Estonia) Peeter Klein	Nõmme Kalju U21
September	(Estonia) Aivar Lillevere	Tulevik	(Estonia) Kristen Kähr	Tulevik
October	(Estonia) Aivar Lillevere	Tulevik	(Estonia) Robert Kirss	Nõmme Kalju U21

=== Esiliiga Player of the Year ===
Eduard Golovljov was named Esiliiga Player of the Year.

== See also ==
- 2015–16 Estonian Cup
- 2016–17 Estonian Cup
- 2016 Meistriliiga
- 2016 Esiliiga B
