= 2016 Esiliiga B =

Estonian football league season for third division

Esiliiga B
- Season: 2016
- Champions: Kuressaare (1st title)
- Promoted: Kuressaare; Elva; Welco
- Relegated: Flora U19; Tulevik II
- Matches played: 180
- Goals scored: 672 (3.73 per match)
- Top goalscorer: Maarek Suursaar (33 goals)
- Biggest home win: Kuressaare 12–0 Tulevik II (12 June 2016)
- Biggest away win: Tulevik II 0–6 Tallinna Kalev II (10 July 2016); Tulevik II 0–6 Sillamäe Kalev II (29 August 2016)
- Highest scoring: Kuressaare 10–3 Tammeka U21 (14 July 2016)
- Longest winning run: 7 matches Kuressaare
- Longest unbeaten run: 12 matches Kuressaare; Elva
- Longest winless run: 15 matches Tulevik II
- Longest losing run: 12 matches Tulevik II

The 2016 Esiliiga B was the 4th season of the Esiliiga B, the third-highest Estonian league for association football clubs, since its establishment in 2013. The season began on 28 February 2016 and concluded on 6 November 2016.

Kuressaare won the league, finishing with 76 points and were promoted to the Esiliiga. It was their first Esiliiga B title in history.

== Teams ==
=== Stadia ===
Locations of the 2016 Esiliiga B teams

Team	Location	Stadium	Capacity
Elva	Elva	Elva linnastaadion	30
Flora U19	Tallinn	Sportland Arena	540
Joker	Raasiku	Raasiku artificial turf	200
Kuressaare	Kuressaare	Kuressaare linnastaadion	1,000
Sillamäe Kalev II	Sillamäe	Sillamäe Kalev artificial turf	0
Tallinna Kalev II	Tallinn	Kalev Keskstaadion artificial turf	270
Tammeka U21	Tartu	Sepa Stadium	300
Tulevik II	Viljandi	Viljandi linnastaadion	1,068
Viimsi	Haabneeme	Viimsi KK Stadium	
Welco	Tartu	Tamme Stadium	1,750

=== Personnel and kits ===
Team	Manager	Captain	Kit manufacturer	Shirt sponsor
Elva	(Estonia) Kaido Koppel	(Estonia) Jürgen Kuresoo	Nike	Sportland
Flora U19	(Estonia) Risto Kallaste	(Estonia) Silver Räämet	Nike	Tele2
Joker	(Estonia) Andre Ilves	(Estonia) Rene Lill	Joma	Unibox
Kuressaare	(Estonia) Sander Viira	(Estonia) Elari Valmas	Joma	Saaremaa Lihatööstus
Sillamäe Kalev II	(Ukraine) Vadym Dobizha		Uhlsport	Alexela
Tallinna Kalev II	(Estonia) Daniel Meijel		Jako	ViisTek Media
Tammeka U21	(Estonia) Timo Teniste		Nike	Goldtime
Tulevik II	(Estonia) Raiko Mutle		Joma	Viljandi Aken ja Uks
Viimsi	(Estonia) Urmas Kirs		Joma	
Welco	(Estonia) Siim Valtna	(Estonia) Mikk Valtna	Nike	

=== Managerial changes ===
Team	Outgoing manager	Manner of departure	Date of vacancy	Position in table	Incoming manager	Date of appointment
Kuressaare	(Estonia) Pelle Pohlak	Signed by Flora U19	1 January 2016	Pre-season	(Estonia) Sander Viira	1 January 2016
Tammeka U21	(Estonia) Sander Lember	Mutual consent	1 January 2016	Pre-season	(Estonia) Timo Teniste	1 January 2016
Flora U19	(Estonia) Pelle Pohlak	Appointed as president of Flora	12 July 2016	9th	(Estonia) Risto Kallaste	12 July 2016

== Results ==
=== League table ===
Pos	Team	Pld	W	D	L	GF	GA	GD	Pts	Promotion, qualification or relegation
1	Kuressaare (C, P)	36	23	7	6	117	48	+69	76	Promotion to the Esiliiga
2	Elva (P)	36	21	5	10	67	39	+28	68	Promotion to the Esiliiga
3	Welco (O, P)	36	20	4	12	74	50	+24	64	Qualification for the promotion play-offs
4	Tammeka U21	36	18	5	13	89	64	+25	59	
5	Tallinna Kalev II (Note: Reserve teams are ineligible for promotion.)	36	16	7	13	72	53	+19	55	
6	Sillamäe Kalev II	36	16	5	15	70	61	+9	53	
7	Joker	36	14	10	12	74	66	+8	52	
8	Viimsi (O)	36	15	6	15	56	64	−8	51	Qualification for the relegation play-offs
9	Flora U19 (R)	36	4	7	25	27	85	−58	19	Relegation to II liiga
10	Tulevik II (R)	36	4	2	30	26	142	−116	14	Relegation to II liiga

Updated to match(es) played on unknown. Source: Esiliiga B (in Estonian)
Rules for classification: 1) Points; 2) Play-off (only if deciding champion); 3) Less matches awarded against; 4) Matches won; 5) Head-to-head points; 6) Head-to-head goal difference; 7) Goal difference; 8) Goals scored; 9) Away goals scored; 10) Fairplay ranking.
(C) Champions; (O) Play-off winners; (P) Promoted; (R) Relegated

=== Results tables ===
==== First half of the season ====
Home \ Away	ELV	FLO	JOK	KUR	SIL	KAL	TAM	TUL	VII	WEL
Elva		5–2	2–4	0–2	3–2	0–1	5–0	2–1	5–1	0–3
Flora U19	0–4		0–2	0–2	1–2	2–1	0–5	5–0	0–1	1–3
Joker	1–1	1–1		3–3	4–2	5–1	1–1	3–2	1–2	2–0
Kuressaare	2–2	5–0	4–1		6–0	0–0	4–2	12–0	6–0	4–0
Sillamäe Kalev II	1–0	0–0	2–1	3–0		0–1	1–2	5–0	2–1	0–2
Tallinna Kalev II	1–0	4–0	1–1	1–2	1–1		1–2	8–0	0–0	2–1
Tammeka U21	0–1	0–0	2–1	1–3	3–1	4–2		6–1	4–1	1–1
Tulevik II	2–0	1–1	0–3	2–5	0–0	0–6	0–4		1–0	1–5
Viimsi	0–2	3–1	1–0	0–1	1–4	3–2	2–1	4–1		0–0
Welco	1–0	5–1	3–1	4–1	0–2	0–1	3–2	2–1	2–0	

Source: Esiliiga B
Legend: Blue = home team win; Yellow = draw; Red = away team win.

==== Second half of the season ====
Home \ Away	ELV	FLO	JOK	KUR	SIL	KAL	TAM	TUL	VII	WEL
Elva		0–0	3–0	2–1	3–0	2–0	0–0	7–2	2–0	0–0
Flora U19	0–1		0–1	0–5	1–0	0–2	0–0	AWD (Note: EJL awarded Tulevik II a win due to Flora U19 fielding an ineligible player. The original match had ended in a 0–0 draw.)	2–2	1–2
Joker	2–3	1–3		2–2	4–4	0–1	1–0	6–1	3–1	2–0
Kuressaare	1–2	5–1	2–2		AWD (Note: EJL awarded Kuressaare a win after Sillamäe Kalev II forfeited the match.)	3–1	10–3	2–0	1–2	8–3
Sillamäe Kalev II	0–2	4–1	2–2	4–1		2–4	2–1	1–0	3–4	3–2
Tallinna Kalev II	1–0	5–1	3–3	0–0	2–4		2–3	5–0	1–1	3–2
Tammeka U21	5–0	3–0	4–1	3–5	4–5	4–1		3–0	4–0	2–0
Tulevik II	2–4	2–1	2–3	1–5	0–6	0–3	2–7		0–3	1–2
Viimsi	1–3	5–0	0–5	2–2	2–1	3–1	4–2	6–0		0–1
Welco	0–1	3–1	7–1	1–2	2–1	4–3	3–1	7–0	0–0	

Source: Esiliiga B
Legend: Blue = home team win; Yellow = draw; Red = away team win.

== Play-offs ==
=== Promotion play-offs ===
Welco, who finished 3rd, faced Nõmme Kalju U21, 8th-placed 2016 Esiliiga side for a two-legged play-off. The first leg originally ended 3–2 to Nõmme Kalju U21 but they were later ruled to have forfeited the match after fielding an ineligible player Henrik Pürg. According to the rules, the second leg was cancelled and Welco earned entry into the 2017 Esiliiga.

==== First leg ====
12 November 2016
14:00 (UTC+2)

Welco	2–0 Awarded	Nõmme Kalju U21
Reinberg 10'; Kaasik 52'	Report

Annelinn Stadium, Tartu
Referee: Kristo Külljastinen

==== Second leg ====
19 November 2016
13:00 (UTC+2)

Nõmme Kalju U21	Match cancelled	Welco

Hiiu Stadium, Tallinn

=== Relegation play-offs ===
Viimsi, who finished 8th, faced Keila, the II liiga play-offs winner. The winner on aggregate score after both matches earned entry into the 2017 Esiliiga B. Viimsi won on away goals.

==== First leg ====
12 November 2016
13:00 (UTC+2)

Keila	2–1	Viimsi
Mõek 77'; Luhaorg 83' (o.g.)	Report	Prints 39'

Keila Stadium, Keila
Referee: Eiko Saar

==== Second leg ====
19 November 2016
12:00 (UTC+2)

Viimsi	1–0	Keila
Sillaste 75'	Report

Viimsi KK Stadium, Haabneeme
Referee: Dmitri Kulikov

== Season statistics ==
=== Top goalscorers ===
Rank	Player	Club	Goals
1	(Estonia) Maarek Suursaar	Kuressaare	33
2	(Estonia) Jürgen Kuresoo	Elva	29
3	(Estonia) Rauno Esop	Joker	25
4	(Estonia) Karl Anton Sõerde	Tallinna Kalev II	22
5	(Estonia) Sander Laht	Kuressaare	17
5	(Estonia) Erki Mõttus	Tammeka U21	17
7	(Russia) Roman Grigorevski	Sillamäe Kalev II	15
7	(Estonia) Mikk Rajaver	Kuressaare	15
9	(Estonia) Mikk Valtna	Welco	14
10	(Estonia) Martin Aasmäe	Tammeka U21	11
10	(Estonia) Andre Ilves	Joker	11

== Awards ==
=== Monthly awards ===
Month	Manager of the Month		Player of the Month	
Month	Manager	Club	Player	Club
March	(Estonia) Timo Teniste	Tammeka U21	(Estonia) Martin-Gert Pärli	Tammeka U21
April	(Estonia) Siim Valtna	Welco	(Estonia) Karl Andre Vallner	Tallinna Kalev II
May	(Estonia) Sander Viira	Kuressaare	(Estonia) Rauno Esop	Joker
June/July	(Estonia) Kaido Koppel	Elva	(Estonia) Sander Laht	Kuressaare
August	(Estonia) Kaido Koppel	Elva	(Estonia) Jürgen Kuresoo	Elva
September	(Estonia) Daniel Meijel	Tallinna Kalev II	(Estonia) Maarek Suursaar	Kuressaare
October	(Estonia) Sander Viira	Kuressaare	(Estonia) Lauri Särak	Welco

=== Esiliiga B Player of the Year ===
Jürgen Kuresoo was named Esiliiga B Player of the Year.

== See also ==
- 2015–16 Estonian Cup
- 2016–17 Estonian Cup
- 2016 Meistriliiga
- 2016 Esiliiga
