= Maardu Linnameeskond =

Estonian football club

- Full name: Maardu Linnameeskond
- Founded: 1997; 29 years ago
- Ground: Maardu Linnastaadion
- Capacity: 1.000
- Chairman: Aleksandr Matvejev
- Manager: Algimantas Briaunys
- League: Esiliiga
- 2025: Esiliiga B, 1st of 10 (champions; promoted)
Home colours	Away colours

Maardu Linnameeskond is a football club based in Maardu, Estonia. The team compete in the Esiliiga, the second tier of the Estonian football league system. They adopted their current name in 2016, before being promoted to the Estonian top tier Meistriliiga for the first time in 2019. They were relegated the following season and played in Esiliiga for the next two seasons. After winning 2021 Esiliiga they should have been promoted to Meistriliiga, but due to financial reasons they waived the opportunity and were relegated to II liiga, taking their reserve squad's place. The team plays its home games at Maardu Linnastaadion.

== Honours ==
=== Domestic ===
- Esiliiga

Winners (3): 2017, 2018, 2021

- Esiliiga B

Winners (2): 2015, 2025

- II Liiga

Winners (2): 2013, 2024

- III Liiga

Winners (1): 2011
Third place (4): 2007, 2008, 2009, 2010

- IV Liiga

Third place (1): 2006

== Players ==
=== Current squad ===
As of 24 July 2026.

Note: Flags indicate national team as defined under FIFA eligibility rules; some limited exceptions apply. Players may hold more than one non-FIFA nationality.

No.	Pos.	Nation	Player
1	GK	EST	Vitali Teleš
2	DF	EST	Aleksandr Volodin
3	DF	EST	Mihhail Jakovlev
4	DF	UKR	Klymentiy Boldyrev (captain)
5	MF	EST	Anton Volossatov
6	MF	EST	Andrei Smirnov
7	MF	EST	Nikita Kondratski
8	MF	EST	Albert Taar
9	FW	EST	Erik Utgof
10	FW	EST	Aleksandr Volkov
11	FW	CIV	Manucho
12	MF	EST	Artjom Volkov
13	FW	RUS	Danil Lebedev
14	MF	EST	Mihhail Jumankin
15	DF	EST	Andrei Grigorjev

No.	Pos.	Nation	Player
17	MF	UKR	Yaroslav Panchenko
18	MF	EST	Vadim Salabai
19	DF	EST	Aleksandr Kulinitš
21	FW	RUS	Nikita Naydis
22	DF	EST	Danil Pankov
23	DF	EST	Maksim Tserezov
24	MF	EST	Anton Kapustin
27	MF	EST	Deniss Tjapkin
30	DF	EST	Vladislav Tšurilkin
34	MF	RUS	Vladimir Malinin
35	GK	EST	Dmitri Pjatajev
44	MF	EST	Romeo Aan
71	FW	EST	Arseni Kovaltšuk
77	MF	EST	Stanislav Tsõmbaljuk
98	GK	EST	Artjom Jakovlev

== Personnel ==
=== Current technical staff ===
Position	Name
Manager	(Lithuania) Algimantas Briaunys

=== Managerial history ===
Manager	Career
(Estonia) Valeri Brõlin	2011–2013
(Estonia) Andrei Borissov	2014–2019
(Estonia) Mark Kolk	2019
(Lithuania) Algimantas Briaunys	2020–

== Statistics ==
=== League and Cup ===
Season	Division	Pos	Pld	W	D	L	GF	GA	GD	Pts	Top goalscorer	Cup	Notes
2006	IV liiga E	3	22	15	1	6	108	36	+72	46	(Estonia) Vjatšeslav Gušinets (29)		as Maardu Esteve
2007	III liiga E	3	22	18	0	4	123	37	+86	54	(Estonia) Tõnis Starkopf (43)	Second round	as Maardu Esteve
2008	III liiga E	3	20	13	4	3	65	37	+28	43	(Estonia) Tõnis Starkopf (23)	Fourth round	as Maardu Esteve
2009	III liiga E	3	22	17	0	5	99	39	+60	51	(Estonia) Maksim Krivošein (34)	Third round	as Maardu Esteve
2010	III liiga E	3	22	14	4	4	90	37	+53	46	(Estonia) Maksim Krivošein (29)	Second round	as FC Maardu
2011	III liiga E	1	22	19	2	1	78	18	+60	59	(Estonia) Maksim Krivošein (19)		as FC Maardu
2012	II liiga N/E	8	26	9	4	13	62	61	+1	31	(Estonia) Vadim Šalabai (12)	Fourth round	as FC Maardu
2013	II liiga N/E	1	24	19	2	3	80	29	+51	59	(Ukraine) Klimentiy Boldyrev (26)	Third round	as Maardu FC Starbunker
2014	Esiliiga B	5	36	16	2	18	70	85	−15	50	(Ukraine) Klimentiy Boldyrev (14)	Second round	as Maardu FC Starbunker
2015	Esiliiga B	1	36	26	3	7	92	38	+54	81	(Ukraine) Klimentiy Boldyrev (25)	Fourth round	as Maardu FC Starbunker
2016	Esiliiga	4	36	16	6	14	83	75	+8	54	(Estonia) Vitali Gussev (31)	Second round	as Maardu Linnameeskond
2017	Esiliiga	1	36	24	5	7	92	44	+48	77	(Estonia) Vitali Gussev (38)	Second round	as Maardu Linnameeskond
2018	Esiliiga	1	36	29	1	6	126	38	+88	88	(Estonia) Vitali Gussev (46)	First round	as Maardu Linnameeskond
2019	Meistriliiga	10	36	4	5	27	30	118	–88	17	(Nigeria) Jasper Uwaegbulam (10)	Quarter-final	as Maardu Linnameeskond
2020	Esiliiga	2	32	20	4	8	68	45	+23	64	(Estonia) Ilja Zelentsov (22)	Third round	as Maardu Linnameeskond
2021	Esiliiga	1	30	23	4	3	99	30	+69	73	(Estonia) Vitali Gussev (21)	Quarter-final	as Maardu Linnameeskond
