= FC Ararat Tallinn =

Estonian football club

Ararat Tallinn
- Full name: Jalgpalliklubi FC Ararat
- Founded: 2005; 21 years ago
- Ground: Lasnamäe Sports Complex, Tallinn
- Chairman: Avetis Harutjunjan
- Manager: Aleksandr Pushtov
- Coach: Igor Shemyatkov
- League: III liiga North
- 2022: 8th
- Website: https://www.fcararat.ee

Jalgpalliklubi FC Ararat, commonly known as FC Ararat Tallinn, or simply as Ararat, is a football team based in Tallinn, Estonia, who play in the III liiga North. It was founded by a group of Armenian players to promote Armenian identity and named after Mount Ararat.

== Players ==
=== Current squad ===
As of 13 November 2019.

Note: Flags indicate national team as defined under FIFA eligibility rules; some limited exceptions apply. Players may hold more than one non-FIFA nationality.

No.	Pos.	Nation	Player
1	GK	EST	Sergei Bolgov (vice-captain)
7	DF	EST	Sergei Lefanov
9	DF	EST	Artur Tukmatšov (vice-captain)
2	DF	EST	Nikita Godovanets
11	DF	EST	Aleksei Belozjorov
30	MF	ARM	Vaagn Arutjunjan (captain)
4	MF	EST	Artur Mintšenkov
40	MF	EST	Pavel Kondakov
31	FW	EST	Stanislav Borodin
13	FW	EST	Paulo Kulešov
16	FW	UKR	Denys Zakharets

No.	Pos.	Nation	Player
38	GK	EST	Aleksei Grigorenko
35	DF	EST	Aleksander Kiudmaa
25	DF	EST	Jevgeni Šatalin
8	DF	EST	Dmitri Škredov
12	MF	EST	Artjom Varfolomejev
18	MF	EST	Dmitri Ptitsõn
3	MF	UKR	Bogdan Lukashenko
36	MF	EST	Aleksandr Korosteljov
5	FW	RUS	Andrei Lomov
10	FW	EST	Daniel Zaguskin
21	FW	UKR	Herman Semykozov

== Statistics ==
=== League and Cup ===
Season	League	Pos	Pld	W	D	L	GF	GA	GD	Pts	Top Goalscorer	Cup
2005	IV liiga N	3	22	15	2	5	62	21	+41	47	(Estonia) Vitali Ivahnenko (13)	
2006	III liiga N	1	22	18	2	2	92	29	+63	56	(Russia) Yevgeni Grechko (13)	
2007	II liiga N/E	3	26	15	6	5	49	35	+14	51	(Estonia) Vitali Ivahnenko (16)	
2008	II liiga N/E	3	26	14	8	4	63	28	+35	50	(Estonia) Avetis Harutjunjan (11)	
2009	II liiga N/E	4	26	17	4	5	97	35	+62	55	(Estonia) Pavel Apalinski (13)	
2010	II liiga N/E	12	24	6	8	10	40	53	−13	26	(Estonia) Andrei Usmanov (13)	Third round
2011	III liiga N	1	22	17	3	2	57	14	+43	54	(Estonia) Vladimir Kuzmin (10)	Third round
2012	II liiga N/E	5	26	12	7	7	58	46	+12	43	(Estonia) Avetis Harutjunjan (16)	Third round
2013	Esiliiga B	4	36	20	3	13	77	50	+27	63	(Estonia) Andre Järva (16)	Third round
2014	Esiliiga B	8	36	9	5	22	55	80	−25	32	(Estonia) Margo Parkala (10)	Fourth round
2015	Esiliiga B	9	36	6	7	23	51	114	−63	25	(Estonia) Silvestr Belozjorov and Vaagn Arutjunjan (8)	-
2016	II liiga S/W	12	26	5	3	18	41	101	−60	18	(Estonia) Avetis Harutjunjan (11)	First round
2017	II liiga N/E	13	26	6	5	15	36	69	−33	23	(Estonia) Avetis Harutjunjan (14)	Second round
2018	II liiga N/E	7	26	11	5	10	43	47	−4	38	(Ukraine) Denys Zakharets (19)	First round
2019	II liiga N/E	12	26	7	6	13	43	57	−14	27	(Ukraine) Denys Zakharets (18)	-
2020	III liiga N	7	22	11	3	8	51	40	+11	36	(Ukraine) Denys Zakharets (18)	-
