= Ida-Virumaa FC Alliance =

Estonian football club

- Full name: Ida-Virumaa FC Alliance
- Founded: 2012
- Ground: Kiviõli Arena, Kiviõli
- Chairman: Sergei Dorofeev
- Manager: Andrei Škaleta
- League: Esiliiga
- 2022: Esiliiga, 8th
- Website: http://www.fcjarve.ee/
Home colours	Away colours

Club's previous logo

Ida-Virumaa FC Alliance is an Estonian football club operating in Ida-Viru County. They play in the Esiliiga, the second highest level of Estonian football league pyramid. The club was created in 2012, when Kohtla-Järve JK Alko and Kohtla-Järve FC Lootus joined. Before 2021, the team was called Kohtla-Järve JK Järve.

Before the 2023 season, the club moved their home matches from Spordikeskuse Staadion in Kohtla-Järve to Kiviõli Arena in Kiviõli.

== Players ==
=== Current squad ===
As of 25 September 2023.

No.	Pos.	Nation	Player
1	GK	(Ukraine) UKR	Artur Shamanskyi
2	DF	(Cameroon) CMR	Jean Marie Wadjonre Amadou
4	DF	(Estonia) EST	Alex Boronilstsikov
5	DF	(Estonia) EST	Grigori Mitsuk
6	FW	(Estonia) EST	Aleks Vitrikus
7	MF	(Estonia) EST	Danila Tsogankov
8	MF	(Estonia) EST	Maksim Miskov
9	FW	(Estonia) EST	Konstantin Pavlov
10	FW	(Estonia) EST	Mihhail Orlov
12	FW	(Estonia) EST	Eduard Zotov (on loan from Jõhvi FC Phoenix)
14	DF	(Estonia) EST	Kirill Koskor
15	DF	(Estonia) EST	Maksim Jakovlev

No.	Pos.	Nation	Player
17	DF	(Brazil) BRA	Paulo Vitor
19	FW	(Ukraine) UKR	Marek Satov
22	MF	(Estonia) EST	Ivan Ivanov
24	MF	(Estonia) EST	Arkadi Butenko
25	DF	(Estonia) EST	Ramaz Kardava
27	GK	(Estonia) EST	Ilja Barkanov
28	FW	(Ukraine) UKR	Akim Sutskov
30	FW	(Estonia) EST	Raivo Saar
31	DF	(Estonia) EST	Roman Nikonorov
69	GK	(Estonia) EST	Nikita Kanev
70	MF	(Russia) RUS	Iraklii Torinava
99	FW	(Estonia) EST	Vadim Velikanov

=== Out on loan ===
Note: Flags indicate national team as defined under FIFA eligibility rules; some limited exceptions apply. Players may hold more than one non-FIFA nationality.

No.	Pos.	Nation	Player
11	MF	(Estonia) EST	Roland Kardava (at Levadia U21)

== Seasons in Estonian football ==
Season	League	Pos	Pld	W	D	L	GF	GA	GD	Pts	Avg. Att.	Top Scorer	Notes
2013	Esiliiga B	10	36	4	5	27	26	79	−53	17	35	Grigori Tipukin (9)	as Kohtla-Järve JK Järve
2014	Esiliiga B	7	36	11	4	21	53	77	−24	37	43	Alexander Nikulin (7)	as Kohtla-Järve JK Järve
2015	Esiliiga B	2	36	21	9	6	66	29	+37	72	61	Aleksei Tihhonov (9)	as Kohtla-Järve JK Järve
2016	Esiliiga	10	36	8	6	22	42	97	–55	30	58	Lasha Kemukhtashvili (8)	as Kohtla-Järve JK Järve
2017	Esiliiga B	5	36	15	6	15	55	48	+7	51	66	German Narnitski and Aleksei Tihhonov (12)	as Kohtla-Järve JK Järve
2018	Esiliiga B	3	36	21	6	9	80	39	+41	69	74	Aleksandr Ivanjusin (14)	as Kohtla-Järve JK Järve
2019	Esiliiga	7	36	12	4	20	51	82	–31	40	72	Raivo Saar (17)	as Kohtla-Järve JK Järve
2020	Esiliiga	10	30	1	3	26	13	91	–78	3	?	Gleb Pevtsov (4)	as Kohtla-Järve JK Järve
2021	Esiliiga B	3	32	17	2	13	63	70	-7	53	?	Mihhail Orlov (20)	as Ida-Virumaa FC Alliance
2022	Esiliiga	8	36	8	3	25	29	105	-76	27	?	Mihhail Orlov and Roland Kardava (7)	as Ida-Virumaa FC Alliance
2023	Esiliiga	10	36	6	2	28	50	123	-73	20	?	Mihhail Orlov (16)	as Ida-Virumaa FC Alliance
