= Karl Rudolf Õigus =

Estonian footballer

Personal information
- Full name: Karl Rudolf Õigus
- Date of birth: 5 November 1998 (age 28)
- Place of birth: Tartu, Estonia
- Position: Forward

Team information
- Current team: Kuressaare
- Number: 16

Youth career
- 2010–2014: Santos Tartu

Senior career*
Years	Team	Apps	(Gls)
2014–2017	Santos Tartu II	33	(11)
2015–2018	Santos Tartu	107	(33)
2018–2022	Levadia U21	64	(25)
2018–2022	Levadia	69	(6)
2023–	Kuressaare	68	(5)

International career^{‡}
2019–2020	Estonia U21	5	(0)
2021	Estonia	3	(0)
- * Club domestic league appearances and goals as of 10 November 2024 ‡ National team caps and goals as of 30 August 2023

Karl Rudolf Õigus (born 5 November 1998) is an Estonian footballer who plays as a forward for Kuressaare.

== Club career ==
On 3 February 2023 he signed Kuressaare.

== International career ==
Õigus made his international debut for Estonia on 24 March 2021 in a 2022 FIFA World Cup qualification match against the Czech Republic.

== Career statistics ==
=== International ===
As of 24 March 2021

Estonia
Year	Apps	Goals
2021	3	0
Total	3	0
