= FC Elva =

Estonian football club

Elva
- Full name: Jalgpalliklubi FC Elva
- Founded: 8 August 2000; 26 years ago
- Ground: Tehvandi Stadium
- Capacity: 3,144
- Chairman: Are Altraja
- Manager: Kaido Koppel
- League: Esiliiga
- 2026: Esiliiga, 4th of 10
- Website: http://www.fcelva.ee
Home colours	Away colours

FC Elva is a football club, based in Elva, Estonia, that competes in the Esiliiga, the second level of Estonian football.

== History ==
Elva came close to rising to the top-division Meistriliiga for the first time following their successful 2022 season, but they lost in the promotion play-offs to TJK Legion. A month later Legion had to renounce their league spot due to financial trouble. According to the rules Legion's place was given to Pärnu Vaprus, who finished the season last behind Legion.

== Players ==
=== First-team squad ===
As of 3 September, 2026

Note: Flags indicate national team as defined under FIFA eligibility rules; some limited exceptions apply. Players may hold more than one non-FIFA nationality.

No.	Pos.	Nation	Player
3	DF	EST	Hegert Härm
4	DF	TOG	Yawo Dominique Agbowoatsi
5	DF	LAT	Rikardo Jagodinskis
6	DF	EST	Veiko Kütt
7	MF	EST	Andre Paju
8	MF	EST	Rasmus Lindmäe
9	FW	USA	John-Paul Mbuthia
10	MF	EST	Jasper Reilson
11	FW	EST	Kevin Burov (on loan from Tartu Tammeka)
12	GK	EST	Mikk Markus Jänes

No.	Pos.	Nation	Player
13	MF	EST	Jasper Kanter
15	MF	EST	Ruuben Jaagant
16	DF	EST	Martin Thomson
18	MF	EST	Kristo Põldsaar (captain)
22	FW	EST	Peeter Alev
27	MF	EST	Dominic Laaneots
28	FW	USA	Kevon Evans
36	MF	EST	Erik Ilves
55	DF	EST	Georg Lani (on loan from Tartu Tammeka)
77	GK	EST	Silver Rebane

=== Out on loan ===
Note: Flags indicate national team as defined under FIFA eligibility rules; some limited exceptions apply. Players may hold more than one non-FIFA nationality.

No.	Pos.	Nation	Player
2	DF	EST	Ron Neltsas (at Flora U21 until 31 December 2026)

== Personnel ==
=== Current technical staff ===
Position	Name
Head coach	(Estonia) Kaido Koppel
Assistant coach	(Estonia) Asser-Enri Soro
Goalkeeping coach	(Spain) Jose Alvaro Garcia

=== Managerial history ===
Dates	Name
2004	(Estonia) Marko Lelov
2005–2008	(Estonia) Aivar Lillevere
2009–2013	(Estonia) Marek Naaris
2014–2016	(Estonia) Kaido Koppel
2017–2023	(Estonia) Veiko Haan
2024–	(Estonia) Kaido Koppel

== Statistics ==
=== League and Cup ===
Season	Division	Pos	Teams	Pld	W	D	L	GF	GA	GD	Pts	Avg.Att.	Top Goalscorer	Estonian Cup
2001	Esiliiga	5	8	28	12	6	10	64	33	+31	42		Argo Arbeiter and Janek Kalda (14)	
2002	Esiliiga	7	8	28	5	5	18	40	61	−21	18		Janek Kalda (8)	
2003	II Liiga S/W	4	8	28	11	5	12	62	48	+14	38		Reimo Oja (17)	
2004	II Liiga S/W	2	8	28	18	4	6	90	39	+51	58		Vitali Ištšuk (20)	
2005	Esiliiga	7	10	36	10	6	20	42	71	−29	36		Kaarel Kümnik and Rasmus Luhakooder (6)	
2006	Esiliiga	10	10	36	4	3	29	20	100	−80	15		Rauno Tutk and Kristjan Suurjärv (4)	
2007	Esiliiga	10	10	36	2	2	32	17	116	−99	11		Priit Betlem (4)	Fourth round
2008	II Liiga N/E	14	14	26	1	1	24	11	151	−140	4		Tauno Laja and Tauri Tursk (2)	Third round
2009	II Liiga S/W	7	14	26	11	6	9	54	41	+13	39	21	Marten Mütt (6)	Second round
2010	II Liiga S/W	14	14	26	2	2	22	13	86	−73	8	18	Erkki Kubber and Tauno Laja (3)	First round
2011	III Liiga S	1	12	22	16	5	1	81	18	+63	53	86	Jürgen Kuresoo (20)	Third round
2012	II Liiga S/W	4	14	26	15	5	6	65	29	+36	50	128	Jürgen Kuresoo (30)	Fourth round
2013	Esiliiga B	6	10	36	13	7	16	56	64	−8	46	151	Jürgen Kuresoo (34)	Second round
2014	Esiliiga B	6	10	36	12	5	19	45	79	−34	41	161	Jürgen Kuresoo (18)	Second round
2015	Esiliiga B	4	10	36	16	6	14	62	45	+17	54	138	Jürgen Kuresoo (24)	First round
2016	Esiliiga B	2	10	36	21	5	10	67	39	+28	68	210	Jürgen Kuresoo (33)	Second round
2017	Esiliiga	9	10	36	9	2	25	40	90	-50	29	194	Ats Joandi (11)	Fourth round
2018	Esiliiga	4	10	36	15	10	11	51	64	-13	55	239	Jürgen Kuresoo (16)	Semi-final
2019	Esiliiga	5	10	36	18	2	16	67	63	+4	56	260	Martin Thomson and Jürgen Kuresoo (13)	Semi-final
2020	Esiliiga	5	10	32	14	7	11	54	52	+2	49	271	Devid Lehter (17)	First round
2021	Esiliiga	6	10	27	9	2	16	42	54	-12	29	107	Jasper Reilson (6)	Fourth round
2022	Esiliiga	3	10	36	20	6	10	76	52	+24	66	224	Andre Paju (15)	Fourth round
