= Maardu linnastaadion =

Football stadium in Maardu, Estonia

- Interactive map of Maardu linnastaadion
- Location: Maardu, Estonia
- Coordinates: 59°28′47″N 25°1′22″E
- Capacity: 500

Construction
- Built: 1979
- Renovated: 2013

Tenants
- Maardu Linnameeskond (1997–present); Levadia (1998–1999)

Maardu linnastaadion is a football stadium in Maardu, Estonia. It has a natural-grass pitch, and is home to Maardu Linnameeskond and other local clubs. It has a listed seating capacity of 500.

== Facilities ==
Maardu linnastaadion has a natural-grass pitch measuring 100 by 70 meters. The stadium has three changing rooms. According to the Estonian Football Association, the stadium was renovated in 2013. This sports complex also includes an adjacent artificial-turf football pitch that has floodlighting and 208 seats.

== Use ==
Maardu linnastaadion is host to Maardu Linnameeskond. It has previously also hosted matches of Maardu Aliens who are an amateur football team.

It was the first home ground of FCI Levadia, when it hosted their 1998 Esiliiga winning season and their first championship winning season in 1999.

== See also ==
- Maardu Linnameeskond
- Maardu
