= FC Santos Tartu =

Estonian football club

Tartu Santos
- Full name: Football Club Tartu Santos
- Founded: 2006
- Dissolved: 2019
- Ground: Tartu Annelinna kunstmurustaadion
- Chairman: Meelis Eelmäe
- Manager: Janar Sagim
- 2019: II liiga E/N, 14th
Home colours	Away colours

Former logo

Football Club Tartu Santos is an Estonian football club based in Tartu. Their home ground is Holm Park.

== History ==
In 2014 Santos, while competing in the third tier of Estonian football, reached the 2013–14 Estonian Cup final. Their opponent in the final was the reigning Estonian champion FC Levadia, already qualified for the Champions League, therefore Santos qualified for the 2014–15 UEFA Europa League as cup runner-up. Santos went out on aggregate 1–13 to Tromsø of Norway but scored their first ever goal in a European competition.

Because of their appearance in the 2013–14 Estonian Cup final, Santos also qualified for the Estonian Supercup at the start of the 2015 season. They faced 2014 Meistriliiga champions FC Levadia Tallinn. The match took place on 3 March 2015 and finished in a 5–0 defeat for Santos.

After the 2018 Esiliiga season, the club decided to continue as a full-amateur team and drop 2 leagues lower to II liiga.

== Players ==
=== Current squad ===
As of 11 April 2017.

Note: Flags indicate national team as defined under FIFA eligibility rules; some limited exceptions apply. Players may hold more than one non-FIFA nationality.

No.	Pos.	Nation	Player
1	GK	EST	Ermo Ojaste
2	DF	EST	Frederik Pelska
5	MF	EST	Karl Õigus
6	DF	EST	Kaarel Kallandi
7	FW	EST	Jarmo Aaviste
8	MF	EST	Mark-Sandor Kolts
12	DF	EST	Kenn Laas
14	FW	EST	Rene Prans
15	MF	EST	Alex Meinhard
16	MF	EST	Joonas Luts

No.	Pos.	Nation	Player
18	MF	EST	Markus Soomets
19	FW	EST	Robert Pluum
21	FW	EST	Ander Vool
22	DF	EST	Siim Roops
23	MF	EST	Joonas Kartsep (captain)
25	MF	EST	Karl Markus Koivastik
27	DF	EST	Kevin Märtmaa
31	DF	EST	Marten Zovo
92	DF	EST	Oskar Meus
99	FW	EST	Karl-Erik Vidaja

== Honours ==
=== Domestic ===
- Esiliiga B

Runners-up (1): 2014

- II Liiga

Winner (3): 2006, 2008, 2013

- III Liiga

Winner (1): 2005

- IV Liiga

Winner (1): 2004

- V Liiga

Winner (1): 2003

- Estonian Cup

Runners-up (1): 2014

== UEFA club competition results ==
European record

Competition	P	W	D	L	GF	GA
UEFA Europa League	2	0	0	2	1	13

Matches

Season	Competition	Round	Opponent	Home	Away	Aggregate
2014–15	UEFA Europa League	1Q	(Norway) Tromsø	0–7	1–6	1–13

Notes

- 1Q: First qualifying round

== Statistics ==
=== League and Cup ===
Season	League	Pos	Pld	W	D	L	GF	GA	GD	Pts	Top Goalscorer(s)	Cup	Notes
2003	V Liiga	1	16	16	0	0	89	16	+73	48			as Tartu Välk 494
2004	IV Liiga	1	18	16	1	1	71	22	+49	49			as Tartu Välk 494
2005	III Liiga	1	22	19	1	2	89	25	+64	58	(Estonia) Iivo Müürsepp (Estonia) Roomer Tarajev (11)		as Tartu Välk 494
2006	II Liiga	1	28	18	5	5	94	37	+57	59	(Estonia) Martin Maks (17)		as Tartu Välk 494
2007	Esiliiga	9	36	7	8	21	49	93	−44	29		1/8	as Tartu Välk 494
FC Santos and Tartu Välk 494 merged to FC Santos
2008	II Liiga	1	26	18	4	4	74	44	+30	58	(Estonia) Taavi Vellemaa (15)	1/32	as FC Santos
2009–2012	Did not participate												
2013	II Liiga	1	26	24	1	1	138	16	+122	73	(Estonia) Alar Alve (25)	F	as FC Santos Tartu
2014	Esiliiga B	2	36	32	0	4	161	27	+134	96	(Ukraine) Yuriy Vereshchak (43)	1/64	as FC Santos Tartu
2015	Esiliiga	8	36	12	6	18	56	83	−27	42	(Estonia) Alar Alve (Estonia) Taavi Vellemaa (11)	1/4	as FC Santos Tartu
2016	Esiliiga	6	36	16	1	19	63	70	−7	49	(Estonia) Alex Meinhard (14)	1/64	as FC Santos Tartu
2017	Esiliiga	8	36	13	4	19	75	74	+1	43	(Estonia) Alex Meinhard (22)	1/32	as FC Santos Tartu
2018	Esiliiga	7	36	11	8	17	47	68	-21	41	(Estonia) Kristofer Reinberg (11)	1/16	as FC Santos Tartu

== Coaches ==
Name	Career
(Estonia) Mikk Laas	1 January 2014 – 21 April 2014
(Lithuania) Algimantas Liubinskas	21 April 2014 – 31 December 2014
