= FC Flora U19 =

Estonian football club

Flora U19
- Full name: FC Flora U19
- Founded: 2012
- Ground: Sportland Arena
- Capacity: 540
- President: Pelle Pohlak
- Manager: Oskar Pedosk
- League: II Liiga
- Website: http://www.fcflora.ee
Home colours	Away colours

FC Flora U19 Tallinn, commonly known as Flora U19 Tallinn, or simply as Flora U19, is a football club, based in Tallinn, Estonia.

Founded as FC Flora III, it is the reserve team of Flora U21, and currently plays in the II Liiga.

Reserve teams in Estonia play in the same league system as the senior team, rather than in a reserve team league. They must play at least one level below their main side, however, so Flora U19 is ineligible for promotion to the Esiliiga but can play in the Estonian Cup.

== Players ==
=== Current squad ===
As of 22 March 2016.

Note: Flags indicate national team as defined under FIFA eligibility rules; some limited exceptions apply. Players may hold more than one non-FIFA nationality.

No.	Pos.	Nation	Player
1	GK	(Estonia) EST	Auris Veelmaa
3	DF	(Estonia) EST	Rando Kolatsk
4	DF	(Estonia) EST	Kermo Muraveiski
71	MF	(Estonia) EST	Jakob Laiv
54	DF	(Estonia) EST	Kaur Allan Lips
47	FW	(Finland) FIN	Atte Markus Haapaniemi
27	FW	(Estonia) EST	Erik Loik
11	MF	(Estonia) EST	Georg Ander Sild
14	DF	(Estonia) EST	Ken Kaljumäe
15	MF	(Estonia) EST	Georg-Kevin Tõnts
16	MF	(Estonia) EST	Mark Ivanov
17	DF	(Estonia) EST	Remi Kõivik
19	DF	(Estonia) EST	Kaspar Ait
20	MF	(Estonia) EST	Reiko Mägi
21	MF	(Estonia) EST	Tõnis Orav

No.	Pos.	Nation	Player
81	MF	(Estonia) EST	Jaagup Esta
27	MF	(Estonia) EST	Markus Muuk
33	DF	(Estonia) EST	Karl Toomas Radik
44	MF	(Estonia) EST	Andres Dobõšev-Proosväli
—	GK	(Estonia) EST	Rasmus Kriisa
—	DF	(Estonia) EST	Henri Lehtmets
—	DF	(Estonia) EST	Tormi Ohtla
—	MF	(Estonia) EST	Kristjan Baikov
—	MF	(Estonia) EST	Rio Rando Kallaste
—	MF	(Estonia) EST	Otto-Robert Lipp
—	MF	(Estonia) EST	Oliver Rass
—	MF	(Estonia) EST	Taavi Christopher Tuisk
—	MF	(Estonia) EST	Ronald Viisimaa
—	FW	(Estonia) EST	Martin Gontšarov

== Personnel ==
=== Current technical staff ===
Position	Name
Manager	(Estonia) Oskar Pedosk
Assistant manager	(Estonia) Jürmo Jürgen
Physiotherapist	(Estonia) Kristiina Lind

=== Managerial history ===
Manager	Career
(Estonia) Jürgen Henn	2012–2013
(Estonia) Dmitri Ustritski	2013–2014
(Estonia) Pelle Pohlak	2014–2016
(Estonia) Risto Kallaste	2016
(Estonia) Urmas Rajaver	2017
(Turkey) Afşın Dalgıç	2018–2019
(Estonia) Oskar Pedosk	2019–
