= Jürgen Kuresoo =

Estonian footballer

Personal information
- Full name: Jürgen Kuresoo
- Date of birth: 11 February 1987 (age 39)
- Place of birth: Elva, Estonia
- Height: 1.76 m (5 ft 9 in)
- Positions: Forward; midfielder

Youth career
- SK 10 Premium Tartu

Senior career*
Years	Team	Apps	(Gls)
2002–2003	JK Merkuur Juunior Tartu		
2004–2009	FC Flora Tallinn	90	(9)
2004–2005	→ JK Tervis Pärnu	40	(10)
2006–2009	→ FC Flora II Tallinn	28	(16)
2008	→ JK Kalev Sillamäe (loan)	13	(0)
2009	→ JK Tulevik Viljandi	19	(4)
2010	JK Sillamäe Kalev	27	(2)
2011–2025	FC Elva	369	(187)

International career
	Estonia U17	6	(0)
	Estonia U19	10	(0)
	Estonia U21	16	(0)
2005–2006	Estonia	2	(0)
- * Club domestic league appearances and goals as of 27 February 2026

Jürgen Kuresoo (born 11 February 1987, in Elva) is an Estonian former footballer and football coach. He played the position of forward and is 1.76 m tall. He has also worked as Elva's youth coach and assistant coach. In his earlier career, he played as a midfielder.

== Club career ==
Having previously played for Sillamäe Kalev and Flora, he joined FC Elva in 2010, while team was in III liiga. Kuresoo scored his 100th goal for the club on 5 October 2014 after which he expressed his desire to remain in the club until the end of his career. The club was promoted to Esiliiga in 2017.

== International career ==
On 15 November 2005, Kuresoo made the first team debut as a substitute in a 3–1 defeat against Poland.

== Honours ==
=== Individual ===
- Esiliiga B Player of the Year: 2015, 2016
