= Nõmme Kalju FC U21 =

Estonian football reserve team

Nõmme Kalju U21
- Full name: Nõmme Kalju FC U21
- Founded: 2003
- Ground: Hiiu Stadium
- Capacity: 670
- President: Kuno Tehva
- Manager: Alger Džumadil
- League: Esiliiga B
- 2026: Esiliiga, 9th of 10 (relegated)
- Website: www.jkkalju.ee
Home colours	Away colours

Nõmme Kalju FC U21, commonly known as Nõmme Kalju U21, or simply as Kalju U21, is a football club, based in Nõmme, Tallinn, Estonia.

Founded as Nõmme Kalju II, it is the reserve team of Nõmme Kalju, and currently plays in the Esiliiga B.

Reserve teams in Estonia play in the same league system as the senior team, rather than in a reserve team league. They must play at least one level below their main side, however, they can play in the Estonian Cup.

== Honours ==
=== Domestic ===
- Esiliiga B

Winners (1): 2013

== Players ==
=== Current squad ===
As of 3 September 2026.

Note: Flags indicate national team as defined under FIFA eligibility rules; some limited exceptions apply. Players may hold more than one non-FIFA nationality.

No.	Pos.	Nation	Player
2	DF	EST	Johannes Lillemets
14	DF	EST	Jens Kaspar Pihkva
15	MF	EST	Igor Subbotin
28	GK	EST	Rasmus Marten Tannenberg
31	MF	EST	Artemi Provodin
33	MF	EST	Valter Helmja
35	GK	EST	Kaspar Rasmus Vahepõld
36	FW	EST	Sten-Mario Väljas (on loan from Tallinna Kalev U21)
40	DF	EST	Oliver Berezjuk
45	MF	EST	Kaspar Sarapuu

No.	Pos.	Nation	Player
47	DF	EST	Aleksandr Anissimov
52	FW	EST	Mark Artjunin
55	DF	EST	Ramaz Kardava
67	FW	EST	Arkadi Butenko
68	MF	EST	Nikita Ingelmann
74	DF	EST	Fjodor Jekimov
75	FW	EST	Reno Tummeltau
77	MF	EST	Sten Tragon
95	MF	EST	Endrik Jaaniste
96	GK	EST	Joonas Kindel

=== Players out on loan ===
Note: Flags indicate national team as defined under FIFA eligibility rules; some limited exceptions apply. Players may hold more than one non-FIFA nationality.

No. / Pos. / Nation / Player; 42 / DF / EST / Kaspar Tomingas (at Tallinna Kalev U21)	No. / Pos. / Nation / Player

== Personnel ==
=== Current technical staff ===
Position	Name
Manager	(Germany) Frank Bernhardt

=== Managerial history ===
Manager	Career
(Brazil) Getúlio Fredo	2011–2012
(Estonia) Zaur Tšilingarašvili	2013–2016
(Estonia) Erko Saviauk	2016–2017
