= FC Flora U21 =

Estonian football reserve team

Flora U21
- Founded: 2006
- Ground: Flora Lilleküla Stadium
- Capacity: 200
- President: Pelle Pohlak
- Manager: Taavi Viik
- League: Esiliiga
- 2026: Esiliiga, 5th of 10
- Website: http://www.fcflora.ee
Home colours	Away colours

FC Flora U21 is an Estonian football team based in Tallinn, Estonia.

It is the reserve team of Flora, and currently plays in Esiliiga. Reserve teams in Estonia play in the same league system as the senior team, rather than in a reserve team league. They must play at least one level below their main side.

== Players ==
=== First-team squad ===
As of 24 July 2026

Note: Flags indicate national team as defined under FIFA eligibility rules; some limited exceptions apply. Players may hold more than one non-FIFA nationality.

No.	Pos.	Nation	Player
41	MF	EST	Kregor Kalvik
42	DF	EST	Joosep Palts
45	FW	EST	Karl-Tristan Lorenz
49	MF	EST	Marten Kukkonen
55	MF	EST	Denis Zotov
56	GK	EST	Artjom Aganits
57	FW	EST	Jako Ilves
63	DF	EST	Ron Neltsas (on loan from Elva)
64	FW	EST	Eiko Maasik
66	MF	EST	Patrick Pihlak
70	FW	EST	Tevan Thor Eensalu
73	MF	EST	Risto Raudsalu

No.	Pos.	Nation	Player
74	MF	EST	Eerik Paltser
75	DF	EST	Karel Isok
76	DF	EST	Ronald Sammul
80	DF	EST	Andreas Poder
87	MF	EST	Mikk Ollisaar
88	FW	EST	Artjom Jakovenko
90	DF	EST	Uku Viiroja
92	GK	EST	Rob Sebastian Miss
93	MF	EST	Jaron Silm
94	MF	EST	Rocco Oja
96	MF	EST	Mattias Luup
97	FW	EST	Uko Korjus

=== Out on loan ===
Note: Flags indicate national team as defined under FIFA eligibility rules; some limited exceptions apply. Players may hold more than one non-FIFA nationality.

No. / Pos. / Nation / Player; 71 / GK / EST / Anders Raestik (at Tallinna Kalev U21 until 31 December 2026)	No. / Pos. / Nation / Player; — / MF / EST / Raian Soosalu (at Viljandi JK until 31 December 2026)

== Personnel ==
=== Current technical staff ===
Position	Name
Manager	(Estonia) Taavi Viik
Assistant manager	(Estonia) Oskar Mihkel Kalpus
Goalkeeping coach	(Estonia) Ats Kutter
Physiotherapist	(Estonia) Georg Laasik

=== Managerial history ===
Dates	Name
2007	(Estonia) Ivo Lehtmets
2009	(Estonia) Urmas Kirs
2010	(Estonia) Zaur Tšilingarašvili
2011	(Estonia) Aivar Lillevere
2011–2013	(Estonia) Norbert Hurt
2014–2015	(Estonia) Jürgen Henn
2016–2017	(Estonia) Joel Indermitte
2018–2021	(Estonia) Ats Sillaste
2022-	(Estonia) Taavi Viik

== Honours ==
=== League ===
- Esiliiga
  - Winners (2): 2014, 2015
