= 2008 Estonian Lower Leagues =

Estonian football competition for amateurs

== Level 3 — II liiga / Second league ==
=== II Liiga Ida/Põhi ===
==== Table ====
Pos	Team	P	W	D	L	F	A	Pts
1	Lootus	26	22	3	1	113	13	69
2	TJK Legion	26	20	4	2	68	24	64
3	Ararat	26	14	8	4	63	28	50
4	Orbiit	26	14	6	6	68	28	48
5	Alko	26	14	5	7	69	33	47
6	Kalju (II)	26	14	4	8	46	32	46
7	Kalev Tallinn (II)	26	12	7	7	51	40	43
8	Ajax (II)	26	11	4	11	46	38	37
9	Dünamo	26	10	3	13	47	40	33
10	Anži	26	6	7	13	51	69	25
11	FCA	26	5	5	16	43	83	20
12	Trans (II)	26	3	5	18	34	75	14
13	Kaitseliit	26	4	2	20	29	85	14
14	Elva	26	1	1	24	11	151	4

==== Top scorers ====
Pos	Name	Team	Gls
1	Anton Semjonov	Lootus	28
2	Aleksandr Avdeev	Lootus	22
3	Andrei Afanasov	Kalev (II)	21
4	Aleksandr Marašov	Orbiit	16
5	Aleksei Borissenko	Anži	13
6	Eerik Heinpalu	Kaitseliit	12
7	Juri Gaidajenko	Anži	11
7	Paul Kirsipuu	Dünamo	11
7	Avetis Harutunjan	Ararat	11
10	Sergei Popov	Lootus	10
10	Anti Kõlu	Kalju (II)	10
10	Sven-Jarno Lullu	Kalju (II)	10
10	Marek Tiik	FCA	10
10	Anatoli Beregovski	Dünamo	10
10	Sergei Dõmov	TJK Legion	10

=== II Liiga Lõuna/Lääs ===
==== Table ====
Pos	Team	P	W	D	L	F	A	Pts
1	Santos	26	18	4	4	74	44	58
2	Nõmme Utd	26	18	1	7	72	36	55
3	Tulevik (II)	26	15	3	8	66	34	48
4	Emmaste	26	12	7	7	47	35	43
5	Vaprus (II)	26	13	2	11	82	61	41
6	Sörve (KUR II)	26	10	8	8	41	38	38
7	Võru	26	11	3	12	60	63	36
8	Maag Tammeka (III)	26	9	9	8	60	64	36
9	Ganvix	26	10	4	12	69	50	34
10	Tarvastu	26	10	4	12	39	57	34
11	Kalev Pärnu	26	8	5	13	48	50	29
12	Tabasalu	26	8	4	14	50	64	28
13	FC Warrior Valga (II)	26	6	3	17	41	90	21
14	Kadakas	26	4	3	19	25	88	15

==== Top scorers ====
Pos	Name	Team	Gls
1	Ivar Sova	Nõmme JK United	25
2	Joonas Tamm	JK Tulevik II	24
3	Tauno Kikas	Võru JK	22
4	Ergo Eelmäe	JK Ganvix	19
5	Jaanus Põllumees	JK MT III/FC Warrior II	17
6	Risto Tämmo	Tabasalu PK	16
7	Taavi Vellemaa	FC Santos	15
7	Mihkel Paapsi	FC Santos	15
7	Ants Palumaa	FC Tarvastu	15
10	Ergo Reinvald	HÜJK	13
10	Genet Õunapuu	Pärnu Kalevi SK	13

== Level 4 — III liiga / Third league ==
=== III Liiga Põhi ===
==== Table ====
Pos	Team	P	W	D	L	F	A	Pts
1	Keskerakond	22	16	3	3	75	31	51
2	Piraaja	22	15	3	4	51	20	48
3	TJK Legion (II)	22	14	4	4	80	29	46
4	Olympic	22	10	3	9	43	53	33
5	LiVal	22	9	5	8	49	41	32
6	Tondi	22	10	2	10	58	55	32
7	Ajax Veteranid (AJX III)	22	9	4	9	38	41	31
8	Saue	22	9	1	12	45	55	28
9	EBS	22	8	4	10	41	54	28
10	Kuuse	22	6	2	14	33	58	20
11	Saku	22	4	4	14	29	56	16
12	Eurouniv	22	3	3	16	28	77	12

=== III Liiga Lõuna ===
==== Table ====
Pos	Team	P	W	D	L	F	A	Pts
1	Metec	22	15	3	4	62	34	48
2	Premium	22	13	3	6	43	34	42
3	Lootos	22	11	6	5	79	39	39
4	Vaprus (III)	22	11	5	6	49	38	38
5	Kotkad V.	22	11	4	7	53	41	37
6	Põltsamaa	22	10	4	8	48	42	34
7	Koeru	22	10	2	10	43	40	32
8	Liverpool Pub	22	9	3	10	36	55	30
9	Fauna	22	7	1	14	35	49	22
10	Elva (II)	22	6	4	12	45	58	22
11	Noorus	22	6	2	14	51	60	20
12	FCF Järva-Jaani	22	4	1	17	35	89	13

=== III Liiga Ida ===
==== Table ====
Pos	Team	P	W	D	L	F	A	Pts
1	M.C.	20	15	3	2	90	41	48
2	Oper	20	15	2	3	66	22	47
3	Esteve	20	13	4	3	62	37	43
4	TVMK (III)	20	13	1	6	46	35	40
5	Kotkad T.	20	11	4	5	76	25	37
6	Rada	20	7	3	10	30	44	24
7	Atletik	20	7	3	10	36	46	24
8	Depood	20	5	5	10	38	54	20
9	Štrommi	20	6	1	13	38	81	19
10	Dnipro	20	4	0	16	22	63	12
–	Tempori	20	1	0	19	21	77	3*

=== III Liiga Lääs ===
==== Table ====
Pos	Team	P	W	D	L	F	A	Pts
1	Toompea	22	16	5	1	87	29	53
2	Rummu	22	15	2	5	57	19	47
3	Risti	22	14	1	7	55	32	43
4	Muhumaa	22	11	6	5	55	33	39
5	Atli	22	11	5	6	46	44	38
6	Haiba	22	9	6	7	57	47	33
7	Püsivus	22	8	4	10	43	50	28
8	Kärdla	22	8	1	13	29	44	25
9	Balteco	22	6	5	11	23	38	23
10	Lelle	22	5	7	10	24	40	22
11	Klooga	22	4	1	17	37	102	13
–	Haapsalu	22	3	1	18	27	62	10*

== Level 5 — IV liiga / Fourth league ==
=== IV Liiga Põhi ===
==== Table ====
Pos	Team	P	W	D	L	F	A	Pts
1	Enter	26	20	1	5	135	36	61
2	Hansa Utd	26	17	3	6	96	53	54
3	Kalju (IV)	26	16	4	6	77	42	52
4	Mercury	26	15	5	6	98	45	50
5	HansaNet.ee	26	16	1	9	71	51	49
6	Kristiine	26	14	3	9	85	46	45
7	Jalgpallihaigla	26	14	2	10	78	61	44
8	Ahtamar	26	13	3	10	76	60	42
9	Trummi	26	9	6	11	43	51	33
10	Soccernet	26	9	2	15	69	81	29
11	Toompea 1994 (TMP II)	26	7	3	16	40	59	24
12	Reaal	26	6	4	16	45	166	22
13	Reliikvia	26	2	5	19	33	90	11
14	Magister	26	2	2	22	21	126	8

=== IV Liiga Lõuna ===
==== Table ====
Pos	Team	P	W	D	L	F	A	Pts
1	HaServ	22	21	0	1	108	16	63
2	Otepää	22	19	1	2	85	23	58
3	Luunja	22	16	0	6	107	51	48
4	R&R Löök	22	12	2	8	55	56	38
5	Tabivere	22	12	1	9	72	40	37
6	Aspen	22	10	2	10	50	46	32
7	EMÜ	22	7	5	10	32	41	26
8	Quattromed	22	6	4	12	47	57	22
9	Welco	22	6	3	13	40	67	21
10	Tõrva	22	4	3	15	30	107	15
11	Puka	22	4	1	17	49	98	13
12	Abja	22	3	2	17	23	96	11

=== IV Liiga Ida ===
==== Table ====
Pos	Team	P	W	D	L	F	A	Pts
1	Joker	20	17	2	1	86	20	53
2	Atletik Fan (ATL II)	20	13	2	5	80	52	41
3	Muuga	20	11	5	4	52	33	38
4	Eston Villa	20	10	1	9	46	55	31
5	Loo	20	9	3	8	53	44	30
6	Twister	20	9	1	10	53	59	28
7	Tapa	20	8	2	10	61	50	26
8	Anži (II)	20	7	4	9	35	53	25
9	Kiiu	20	8	0	12	44	54	24
10	Piraaja Kehra (PIR II)	20	5	3	12	36	60	18
11	Igiliikur	20	1	1	18	27	93	4

=== IV Liiga Lääs ===
==== Table ====
Pos	Team	P	W	D	L	F	A	Pts
1	FCF Rapla	22	17	2	3	92	21	53
2	Kumake	22	16	4	2	92	24	52
3	Kose	22	14	4	4	85	23	46
4	Linnugripp	22	13	2	7	47	32	41
5	Märjamaa	22	11	4	7	47	42	37
6	Keila	22	10	7	5	50	33	37
7	Rolling Doors	22	11	1	10	45	59	34
8	Dagöplast	22	7	5	10	49	50	26
9	Saue JK (II)	22	5	2	15	28	92	17
10	Tääksi	22	3	3	16	28	75	12
11	Tribling	22	3	3	16	29	67	12
12	Guwalda	22	2	3	17	34	108	9

== See also ==
- 2008 Meistriliiga
- 2008 Esiliiga
- 2008 Estonian Lower Leagues
- 2007–08 Estonian Cup
