= 2009–10 Estonian Cup =

Estonian football competition

Eesti Karikas

Tournament details
- Country: Estonia
- Teams: 78

Final positions
- Champions: Levadia
- Runners-up: Flora

Tournament statistics
- Matches played: 79
- Goals scored: 424 (5.37 per match)

The 2009–10 Estonian Cup was the twentieth season of the Estonian football knockout tournament organized by Estonian Football Association. Winners of the cup qualified for the second qualifying round of the 2010–11 UEFA Europa League. The defending champions were Flora Tallinn.

== Clubs participating ==
- A&A Kinnisvara
- aaMeraaS
- Ajax Lasnamäe
- Alko
- Aspen
- Atletik
- Atli · 2
- EBS
- Elva · 2
- Esteve
- Eston Villa
- Fauna
- Flora Järva-Jaani
- Flora Rakvere
- Flora Tallinn · 2
- Ganvix
- Guwalda
- Haiba
- Hansa Utd
- HansaNet.ee
- HaServ
- Hell Hunt
- Igiliikur
- Jalgpallihaigla
- Kadakas
- Kaitseliit · 2
- Kalju · 2 · 3
- Keskerakond · 2
- Kristiine
- Koeru
- Kose
- Kotkad
- Kuressaare · 2 · 3
- Legion
- Levadia
- Lootos
- Lootus
- Maaülikool
- Metec
- Metropool
- Navi
- Nõmme Utd
- Noorus 96
- Olympic
- Orbiit
- Otepää
- Paide · 2
- Piraaja
- Premium · 2
- Püsivus
- Quattromed
- Rada · 2
- Reaal
- Reliikvia
- Saue
- Sillamäe Kalev · 2
- Soccernet
- Tabasalu · 2
- Tabivere
- Tallinna Kalev
- Tamme Auto · 2
- Tammeka · 2
- Tapa
- Toompea · 2
- Trans
- Tulevik · 2
- Twister
- Velldoris
- Võru
- Warrior

== First round ==
Team 1	Score	Team 2
N/A
Tamme Auto Kiviõli II	w/o^{‡}	JK Nõmme Kalju III
4 July
Tartu Ülikool Fauna	3–1 (a.e.t.)	Tabasalu Palliklubi II
17 July
JK Alti Rapla	0–0 (a.e.t.) (4–5 pen.)	JK Kotkad Tallinn
21 July
JK Alko Kohtla-Järve	w/o	JK Kaitseliit Kalev Tallinn II
FC Tabivere	0–19	JK Sillamäe Kalev
JK Nõmme Kalju	10–0	JK Kadakas Kernu
JK Viljandi Tulevik	3–1	HaServ Tartu
FC Metropool Pärnu	0–5	FC Narva Trans
Võru JK	2–1 (a.e.t.)	JK Tammeka Tartu II
22 July
FC Flora Rakvere	9–1	SK Tapa
Tallinna JK Legion	0–2 (a.e.t.)	Paide Linnameeskond
Pirita Reliikvia	w/o	FC Ajax Lasnamäe
FC Warrior Valga	3–0	FC EBS Team Tallinn
FC Kose	3–2 (a.e.t.)	Kumake Paide
FC Reaal Tallinn	0–17	FC Lootus Kohtla-Järve
JK Jalgpallihaigla	0–0 (a.e.t.) (4–5 pen.)	FC Haiba
JK Ganvix Türi	6–0	FC Hansa United Tallinn
JK Alti Rapla II	0–12	JK Sörve
SK 10 Premium Tartu	2–3	JK Kalev Sillamäe II
JK Tulevik Viljandi II	3–1	JK Kaitseliit Kalev Tallinn
29 July
Saue JK	1–2	FC Atletik Tallinn
SK 10 Premium Tartu II	1–3	FC Igiliikur Viimsi
WC Guwalda Pärnu	1–6	JK Nõmme Kalju II
SK EMÜ Tartu	3–2	Saaremaa JK

Notes

- ^{‡} Tamme Auto Kiviõli II withdrew from the competition before the dates were drawn.

=== Teams with bye ===
Levadia, Flora II, Otepää, Noorus 96, Esteve, Olympic, Hell Hunt, Keskerakond, Toompea, Quattromed, Metec, Püsivus, Keskerakond II, Kalev Tallinn, Piraaja, Twister, Tammeka, Flora, aaMeraaS, Aspen, Toompea 1994, Soccernet, Eston Villa, Kuressaare, Elva II, HansaNet.ee, Tabasalu, A&A Kinnisvara, Rada II, Tamme Auto, Velldoris, Orbiit, Lootos, Rada, Elva, Nõmme United, Koeru, Navi, Kristiine, FCF Järva-Jaani.

== Second round ==
Team 1	Score	Team 2
N/A
Lootus	w/o^{‡}	Navi
4 August
Kose	0–8	Kuressaare
5 August
Soccernet	1–3	Olympic
Tulevik	5–1	Esteve
Elva II	0–9	Trans
Kalev Sillamäe	w/o	Keskerakond
Kalev Tallinn	3–1	aaMeraaS
Warrior	8–3	Elva
Flora Järva-Jaani	0–2	Flora Tallinn II
Ajax Lasnamäe	w/o	Hell Hunt
Kalev Sillamäe II	1–0	Flora Rakvere
Fauna	0–10	Tamme Auto
Metec	1–5	Võru
Koeru	4–0	Igiliikur
Lootos	5–1	Noorus 96
Kalju III	0–3	Tammeka
Kristiine	1–2	Tabasalu
11 August
Quattromed	1–3	Atletik
Alko	0–3	Levadia
Kalju II	10–1	Püsivus
HansaNet.ee	w/o	Keskerakond II
13 August
A&A Kinnisvara	2–7	Orbiit
19 August
Sörve	0–1	Maaülikool
Ganvix	3–0	Velldoris
Haiba	2–1	Rada
25 August
Rada II	0–9	Flora Tallinn
Kalju	6–0	Kotkad
Paide	2–3	Otepää
Toompea	3–3 (a.e.t.) (3–4 pen.)	Nõmme Utd
26 August
Tulevik II	13–0	Twister
Eston Villa	4–0	Aspen
2 September
Toompea 1994	0–4	Piraaja

Notes

- ^{‡} Navi Vutiselts withdrew from the competition before the dates were announced.

== Third round ==
Team 1	Score	Team 2
1 September
Lootos	2–5	Kuressaare
2 September
Trans	13–0	Haiba
Kalev Tallinn	8–1	Koeru
Maaülikool	0–5	Flora Tallinn II
Võru	w/o	HansaNet.ee
Ajax Lasnamäe	0–3	Lootus
Kalju	5–0	Tulevik II
8 September
Kalev Sillamäe II	0–5	Levadia
Warrior	1–0	Kalju II
Olympic	2–3	Tammeka
9 September
Orbiit	1–3	Ganvix
Atletik	2–1 (a.e.t.)	Eston Villa
16 September
Kalev Sillamäe	3–1 (a.e.t.)	Tulevik
30 September
Nõmme Utd	5–2	Tamme Auto
Piraaja	5–3 (a.e.t.)	Tabasalu
6 October
Flora Tallinn	4–1	Otepää

== Fourth round ==
6 October 2009	Nõmme Kalju	3–1	Tallinna Kalev	Tallinn
18:45 EEST (UTC+03)	Sergei Terehhov 3'; Diego Balbinot 59'; Felipe Nunes 88' (pen.)	Report	2' Rasmus Tomson	Stadium: Hiiu staadion Attendance: 124; Referee: Roomer Tarajev

7 October 2009	Lootus	6–0	Atletik	Kohtla-Järve
16:00 EEST (UTC+03)	Irfan Ametov 51'; Vitali Bolšakov 57'; Valeri Smelkov 65' (pen.); Sergei Popov 72'; Aleksey Zhukov 77'; Anton Semjonov 82'	Report		Stadium: Ahtme Gümnaasiumi kunstmuru Attendance: 15; Referee: Raul Kaivoja

8 October 2009	Ganvix	4–2	Võru	Türi
16:00 EEST (UTC+03)	Ergo Eelmäe 11'; Rauno Uus 32' 84'; Kristo Kiik 32'	Report	82' Tauno Kikas; 86' Jüri Artemkin	Stadium: Linnastaadion; Attendance: 60; Referee: Taavi Tüvist

10 October 2009	Sillamäe Kalev	3–0	Piraaja	Sillamäe
12:00 EEST (UTC+03)	Gvidas Grigas 27'; Dmytro Boyko 48' (pen.); Maksim Gruznov 85'	Report		Stadium: Kalevi staadion Attendance: 80; Referee: Mart Martin

28 October 2009	Flora U21	0–1	Warrior	Tallinn
18:00 EET (UTC+02)		Report	27' Sander Rõivassepp	Stadium: Sportland Arena; Attendance: 46; Referee: Jaan Roos

28 October 2009	Tammeka	4–0	Nõmme United	Tartu
18:45 EET (UTC+02)	Panagiotis Vouis 55', 62'; Reio Laabus 58'; Albert Prosa 70'	Report		Stadium: Tamme staadion Attendance: 100; Referee: Urmo Visnapuu

14 November 2009	Narva Trans	0–3	Levadia	Narva
13:00 EET (UTC+02)		Report	26' Tarmo Neemelo; 53', 90' Vitali Gussev	Stadium: Kreenholmi staadion Attendance: 40; Referee: Eiko Saar

21 November 2009	Kuressaare	0–4	Flora	Kuressaare
13:00 EET (UTC+02)		Report	8', 81', 83' Oliver Konsa; 63' Vjatšeslav Zahovaiko	Stadium: Linnastaadion; Attendance: 60; Referee: Hannes Kaasik

== Quarter-finals ==
13 April 2010	Flora	2–0 (a.e.t.)	Nõmme Kalju	Tallinn
18:45 EEST (UTC+03)	Alo Dupikov 105+2'; Siim Luts 109'	Report		Stadium: Sportland Arena; Attendance: 200; Referee: Hannes Kaasik

14 April 2010	Sillamäe Kalev	0–1	Levadia	Sillamäe
17:30 EEST (UTC+03)		Report	19' Andrei Kalimullin	Stadium: Sillamäe Kalevi kunstmuruväljak Attendance: 220; Referee: Sten Kaldma

14 April 2010	Tammeka	4–1	Warrior	Tartu
18:45 EEST (UTC+03)	Kaarel Kiidron 14'; Martin Haljak 18'; Kaarel Torop 47'; Chris Anderson 73'	Report	84' Raiko Karpov	Stadium: Annelinna kunstmuru Attendance: 130; Referee: Martin Salong

14 April 2010	Lootus	5–0	Ganvix	Kohtla-Järve
18:45 EEST (UTC+03)	Vassili Kulik 19'; Aleksei Mamontov 61'; Vitali Bolšakov 73'; Andrei Škaleta 83', 90'	Report		Stadium: Ahtme Gümnaasiumi kunstmuru Attendance: 70; Referee: Ain Karutoom

== Semi-finals ==
27 April 2010	Flora	4–1	Tammeka	Tallinn
18:45 EEST (UTC+03)	Alo Dupikov 15'; Oliver Konsa 33'; Teet Allas 45'; Rauno Alliku 86'	Report	45' Albert Prosa	Stadium: Sportland Arena; Attendance: 175; Referee: Kristo Tohver

28 April 2010	Levadia	2–0	Lootus	Tallinn
18:45 EEST (UTC+03)	Vladislav Ivanov 19', 33'			Stadium: Maarjamäe kunstmurustaadion Referee: Jaan Roos

== Final ==
11 May 2010	Flora	0–3	Levadia	Tallinn
18:45 EEST (UTC+03)		Report	33' Andero Pebre; 61' Vitali Leitan; 72' Artjom Dmitrijev	Stadium: Kadriorg Stadium; Attendance: 950; Referee: Margus Kotter
