= 2012–13 Estonian Cup =

Estonian football competition

Tournament details
- Country: Estonia
- Teams: 112

Final positions
- Champions: Flora
- Runners-up: Nõmme Kalju

Tournament statistics
- Matches played: 105
- Goals scored: 581 (5.53 per match)

The 2012–13 Estonian Cup was the 23rd season of the Estonia's most prestigious football knockout tournament. The winner of the Cup qualifies for the first qualifying round of the 2013–14 UEFA Europa League. Flora won the competition after they defeated Kalju 3–1 in the final.

== First round ==
The draw was made by Estonian Football Association on 26 May 2012, before the 2011–12 final of the same competition. League level of the club in the brackets. FC Helios is the only team that takes part from Rahvaliiga (RL) — a league organized by Estonian Football Association, but not part of the main league system.

Team 1	Score	Team 2
5 June
FC Haiba (5)	4–3	(3) Tallinna JK Legion
6 June
Tallinna FC Levadia (1)	12–0	(5) FC Toompea 1994
Tallinna FC Levadia III (5)	0–3	(4) Saue JK Laagri
10 June
JK Tallinna Kalev Juunior (5)	0–2	(4) Tallinna FC Olympic
12 June
FC Pokkeriprod (5)	3–2	(5) FC Soccernet
19 June
Nõmme JK Kalju (1)	17–0	(5) SK Eestimaa Kasakad
Kohtla-Järve JK Alko (3)	1–2	(1) FC Viljandi
Tallinna FC Flora (1)	12–0	(4) JK Loo
Tartu JK Tammeka (1)	4–0	(3) Jõhvi FC Lokomotiv
Lasnamäe FC Ajax II (4)	2–5	(3) FC Velldoris
Rummu Dünamo (4)	3–1	(4) Saaremaa JK aameraaS
20 June
Tartu SK 10 II (3)	w/o^{1}	(5) JK Leisi
Lasnamäe FC Ajax (3)	w/o^{2}	(4) SK Tääksi
JK Tallinna Kalev III (4)	3–4 (a.e.t.)	(5) Maccabi
Tallinna JK Piraaja (4)	1–5	(2) Tartu SK 10
Kärdla LM (4)	3–0	(5) Tabasalu JK Charma
JK Baltika Keskerakond (4)	1–14	(2) FC Infonet
Tallinna FC Flora II (2)	8–1	(5) JK Jalgpallihaigla
EMÜ SK (4)	1–3	(3) Viljandi JK Tulevik
FC Helios (RL)	0–4	(5) Ambla Vallameeskond
FC Kose (4)	3–2	(4) JK Kaitseliit Kalev II
FC Otepää (4)	2–1	(4) FCF Tallinna Ülikool
JK Kernu Kadakas (4)	3–0	(5) Tallinna FC Reaal
SK Noorus 96 Jõgeva (4)	3–1	(5) Viimsi FC Igiliikur
PSK Alexela (5)	2–4	(3) FC Maardu
Saku Sporting (5)	3–1	(4) FC Balteco
Suure-Jaani United (4)	3–1	(3) FC Infonet II
Tartu Quattromed (4)	9–0	(5) JK Tartu Löök
Trummi SK (5)	2–6	(4) JK Visadus
Nõmme JK Kalju III (5)	2–1 (a.e.t.)	(4) Tallinna FC Akhtamar
Raasiku FC Joker 1993 (4)	0–9	(3) HÜJK Emmaste
21 June
Kristiine JK (5)	2–3	(3) Nõmme JK Kalju II
JK Tallinna Kalev (1)	12–3	(5) FC Kiiu
Tallinna FC Ararat TTÜ SK (3)	10–0	(5) FC Aspen
Türi Ganvix JK (3)	3–2	(4) Eesti Koondis
Tartu Ülikool Fauna (5)	0–3	(3) JK Kaitseliit Kalev
26 June
Pirita Reliikvia (5)	0–8	(4) Rapla JK Atli
Navi Vutiselts (4)	1–0	(5) Lihula JK
1 July
FC Eston Villa (4)	2–0	(5) FC Lelle
2 July
JK Suema Cargobus (5)	1–3	(4) Võru JK
4 July
Tartu JK Tammeka II (2)	w/o^{3}	(4) Kuusalu JK Rada
Kohtla-Järve FC Lootus (2)	x–1^{4}	(2) FC Puuma
Pärnu Linnameeskond (2)	4–2	(3) JK Luunja
FC Metropool Pärnu (4)	1–7	(2) Kiviõli Tamme Auto
Tallinna JK Dünamo (3)	2–1	(3) Sörve JK
FC Hell Hunt (4)	1–4	(3) FC Elva
6 July
FCF Järva-Jaani SK (4)	3–2	(5) SK Imavere Forss
11 July
Tallinna FC Twister (5)	1–2	(1) FC Kuressaare

Notes

- Note 1: JK Leisi withdrew from the competition.
- Note 2: SK Tääksi withdrew from the competition.
- Note 3: Tartu JK Tammeka II withdrew from the competition.
- Note 4: Kohtla-Järve FC Lootus won the match 4–1, but used a suspended player. Therefore, the match was awarded -:1 to FC Puuma.

=== Byes ===
These teams were not drawn and secured a place in the second round without playing:

- Meistriliiga (Level 1): Narva JK Trans, JK Sillamäe Kalev, Paide Linnameeskond
- Esiliiga (2): Rakvere JK Tarvas
- II Liiga (3): Paide Kumake, Keila JK, FC Nõmme United
- III Liiga (4): Põlva FC Lootos, Koeru JK, Saaremaa JK, Valga FC Warrior, JK Welco Elekter
- IV Liiga (5): Viimsi MRJK, Taebla JK, FC Pubi Trehv, Tartu Quattromed II

== Second round ==
The draw for the second round was made on 27 June.

Team 1	Score	Team 2
11 July
FC Viljandi (1)	6–1	(4) SK Noorus 96 Jõgeva
Tartu Quattromed II (5)	0–8	(2) Rakvere JK Tarvas
Eston Villa (4)	0–6	(1) Tallinna FC Flora
13 July
Türi JK Ganvix (3)	6–1	(5) Ambla Vallameeskond
Suure-Jaani United (4)	4–1	(4) Koeru JK
Paide Linnameeskond (1)	10–0	(5) FC Haiba
17 July
Tallinna FC Olympic (4)	1–5	(4) Tartu Quattromed
18 July
Rummu Dünamo (4)	1–2	(2) Pärnu Linnameeskond
JK Visadus (4)	0–1	(2) FC Infonet
FC Puuma (2)	1–0	(4) Valga FC Warrior
Põlva FC Lootos (4)	3–1	(3) Paide Kumake
FC Nõmme United (3)	1–2	(4) FC Kose
19 July
FC Otepää (4)	0–1	(3) Tartu SK 10 II
22 July
Kernu JK Kadakas (4)	1–2	(4) Saaremaa JK
Nõmme JK Kalju III (5)	0–2	(3) FC Velldoris
Kuusalu JK Rada (4)	3–2	(3) JK Kaitseliit Kalev
Lasnamäe FC Ajax (3)	0–2	(3) HÜJK Emmaste
Maccabi (5)	3–1 (a.e.t.)	(5) Taebla JK
24 July
JK Sillamäe Kalev (1)	6–0	(3) Keila JK
Võru JK (4)	1–1 (a.e.t.) (4–3 p)	(5) FC Pubi Trehv
25 July
Tallinna JK Dünamo (3)	0–5	(2) Kiviõli Tamme Auto
FC Elva (4)	6–1	(4) JK Welco Elekter
FC Maardu (3)	5–0	(4) FCF Järva-Jaani
30 July
Saku Sporting (5)	3–4 (a.e.t.)	(4) Rapla JK Atli
31 July
Tartu JK Tammeka (1)	3–0	(3) Viljandi JK Tulevik
JK Tallinna Kalev (1)	0–4	(1) Nõmme JK Kalju
7 August
Tallinna FC Ararat TTÜ SK (3)	3–2	(1) FC Kuressaare
8 August
Kärdla LM (4)	0–1 (a.e.t.)	(4) Navi Vutiselts
Tallinna FC Flora II (2)	6–0	(5) Viimsi MRJK
14 August
Narva JK Trans (1)	6–0	(4) Saue JK Laagri
15 August
FC Pokkeriprod (5)	0–18	(1) Tallinna FC Levadia
Tartu SK 10 (2)	3–3 (a.e.t.) (7–6 p)	(3) Nõmme JK Kalju II

== Third round ==
The draw for the third round was made on 2 August. Provisional match dates are between 21 and 31 August.

Team 1	Score	Team 2
21 August
Tartu SK 10 II (3)	0–3	(1) Nõmme JK Kalju
22 August
FC Viljandi (1)	2–0	(2) Rakvere JK Tarvas
Tartu Quattromed (4)	9–2	(5) Maccabi
FC Puuma (2)	0–2	(1) JK Sillamäe Kalev
FC Infonet (2)	5–0	(3) Tallinna FC Ararat TTÜ SK
28 August
FC Kose (4)	2–6	(3) Türi JK Ganvix
FC Maardu (3)	0–1	(4) Võru JK
4 September
Tallinna FC Levadia (1)	17–1	(4) Rapla JK Atli
5 September
Suure-Jaani United (4)	1–2	(3) FC Elva
FC Velldoris (3)	3–2	(4) Põlva FC Lootos
9 September
Narva JK Trans (1)	w/o^{5}	(4) Saaremaa JK
12 September
Kiviõli Tamme Auto (2)	w/o^{6}	(4) Kuusalu JK Rada
HÜJK Emmaste (3)	0–4	(1) Tartu JK Tammeka
Tallinna FC Flora II (2)	0–0 (a.e.t.) (4–3 p)	(1) Paide Linnameeskond
Pärnu Linnameeskond (2)	3–2	(4) Navi Vutiselts
Tartu SK 10 (2)	1–9	(1) Tallinna FC Flora

Notes

- Note 5: Saaremaa JK withdrew from the competition.
- Note 6: Kuusalu JK Rada withdrew from the competition.

== Fourth round ==
The draw for the fourth round was made on 23 August.

Team 1	Score	Team 2
25 September
Nõmme JK Kalju (1)	4–3 (a.e.t.)	(1) Tallinna FC Levadia
10 October
Türi JK Ganvix (3)	8–1	(3) FC Velldoris
Kiviõli Tamme Auto (2)	0–1	(1) JK Sillamäe Kalev
FC Infonet (2)	1–1 (a.e.t.) (2–4 p)	(1) Tartu JK Tammeka
Pärnu Linnameeskond (2)	4–2	(4) Võru JK
13 October
Tartu Quattromed (4)	1–7	(1) Narva JK Trans
24 October
FC Viljandi (1)	3–1	(2) Tallinna FC Flora II
FC Elva (3)	0–2	(1) Tallinna FC Flora

== Quarter-finals ==
The draw was made on 28 February 2013, at the opening of new league season. Tammeka got bye to the semi-finals as the eighth quarter-finalist, Viljandi, was disbanded after the 2012 league season.

16 April 2013	Narva Trans	2–1	Sillamäe Kalev	Narva
18:00 UTC+3	Ilya Shesterkov 20'; Nesterovski 89'	Report	35' Tjapkin	Stadium: Kalevi kunstmurustaadion Attendance: 290; Referee: Kristo Tohver

17 April 2013	Pärnu	0–6	Flora	Pärnu
18:00 UTC+3		Report	15', 82' Adou; 35' Laabus; 48', 79' Gussev; 68' Prosa	Stadium: Pärnu kunstmuru Attendance: 135; Referee: Ainar Kuusk

17 April 2013	Nõmme Kalju	5–0	Ganvix	Tallinn
20:00 UTC+3	Voskoboinikov 25', 58', 79'; Quintieri 30'; Dupikov 46'	Report		Stadium: Sportland Arena; Attendance: 85; Referee: Juri Frischer

Tammeka	bye

== Semi-finals ==
The draw was made on 18 April 2013.

30 April 2013	Nõmme Kalju	5–1	Tammeka	Tallinn
19:30 UTC+3	Bärengrub 4'; Quintieri 13', 55'; Puri 18'; Neemelo 52'	Report	17' (o.g.) Puri	Stadium: Sportland Arena; Attendance: 82; Referee: Jaan Roos

30 April 2013	Narva Trans	0–3	Flora	Narva
19:30 UTC+3		Report	28' (pen.) Jürgenson; 52' Prosa; 53' van de Streek	Stadium: Kalevi kunstmurustaadion Attendance: 80; Referee: Kristo Tohver

== Final ==
18 May 2013	Nõmme Kalju	1–3	Flora	Tallinn
17:00 UTC+3	44' Bärengrub	Report	Frolov 15', 49' (pen.); Jürgenson 59'	Stadium: A. Le Coq Arena; Attendance: 3,521; Referee: Jaan Roos

== Top goalscorers ==
Rank	Player	Team	Goals
1	(Estonia) Trevor Elhi	Levadia	9
1	(Estonia) Rimo Hunt	Levadia	9
1	(Estonia) Albert Prosa	Flora	9
4	(Estonia) Ingemar Teever	Levadia	7
5	(Estonia) Jevgeni Gurtšioglujants	Infonet	6
5	(Estonia) Avetis Harutjunjan	Tallinna FC Ararat TTÜ SK	6
5	(Italy) Damiano Quintieri	Nõmme Kalju	6
8	(Estonia) Ergo Eelmäe	Türi JK Ganvix	5
8	(Estonia) Sander Niit	Rapla JK Atli	5
8	(Estonia) Ivar Sova	Tartu Quattromed	5
8	(Estonia) Taavi Vellemaa	Tartu Quattromed	5
