= 2010–11 Estonian Cup =

Estonian football competition

Tournament details
- Country: Estonia
- Teams: 96

Final positions
- Champions: Flora
- Runners-up: Narva Trans

Tournament statistics
- Matches played: 91
- Goals scored: 428 (4.7 per match)

The 2010–11 Estonian Cup was the twenty-first season of the Estonian football knockout tournament organized by the Estonian Football Association. On 10 May 2011, FC Flora Tallinn defeated JK Narva Trans in the final to win the cup and qualify for the second qualifying round of the 2011–12 UEFA Europa League. The defending champions were FC Levadia Tallinn.

== First round ==
The first round pairs were drawn by Estonian Football Association on 2 June 2010. A total of 96 teams registered for the competition, a new competition record.

29 June 2010	Eesti Koondis	0–7	Sillamäe Kalev	Tallinn
18:00 EEST (UTC+03)		Report	21' Nerijus Vasiliauskas; 36' 67'Aleksandr Tarassenkov; 48' (pen.) Aleksey Naumov; 69' Evgeny Kabayev; 72' Vygantas Zubavičius; 82' Jürgen Kuresoo	Stadium: Kadriorg Stadium; Attendance: 46; Referee: Jaan Roos

9 July 2010	TJK Legion II	1–3	EMÜ SK	Tallinn
20:00 EEST (UTC+03)	90' Sergei Krupa	Report	31' Martin Muttik; 35' Vahur Raigna; 68' Viljar Arula	Stadium: Wismari staadion Attendance: 0 Referee: Kaupo Õismaa

20 July 2010	Narva Trans	w/o	Saaremaa JK	Narva
18:45 EEST (UTC+03)				Stadium: Narva Kreenholmi Stadium

20 July 2010	Elva	0–3	Lootus	Tallinn
18:45 EEST (UTC+03)		Report	81' Irfan Ametov; 90' Vasily Kulik; 90' Ivan Lihhatšov	Stadium: Sportland Arena; Attendance: 37; Referee: Andi Kingumets

20 July 2010	Tulevik	14–0	FC Otepää II	Viljandi
18:45 EEST (UTC+03)	2' 13' 49' Rait Kasterpalu; 10' 52' 76' Rasmus Tomson; 18' (pen.) Alan Ventsel; 19' Rasmus Munskind; 44' Mikk Pärt; 61' Edwin Stüf; 83' 87' 90' Rauno Tutk; 84' Mikko Sillast	Report		Stadium: Viljandi linnastaadion Attendance: 80; Referee: Elar Wisdom

20 July 2010	FC Absoluut	1–16	Raasiku FC Joker	Tallinn
18:45 EEST (UTC+03)	82' Oscar Pedosk	Report	7' 12' Hardo Riiberg; 8' 13' 15' 79' 84' Vaiko Eggert; 32' 40' Rauno Pruuli; 47' There Reinike; 60' Priit Betlem; 67' 80' 90' Jaan Jalas; 75' Rando Ilves; 82' Oscar Pedosk; 90' Andre Ilves	Stadium: Laagri kunstmurustaadion Attendance: 7 Referee: Ain Alev

20 July 2010	Tarvastu	3–2	Kose	Soe
18:45 EEST (UTC+03)	7' 19' Tairo Orav; 16' Kaspar Orav	Report	18' Martin Bukin; 19' Tõnis Tüli	Stadium: Soe keskasula staadion Attendance: 100; Referee: Ülo Kikas

20 July 2010	Atletik	12–1	Reaal	Tallinn
18:45 EEST (UTC+03)	6' Jevgeni Grafski; 10' (pen.) 41' 47' Andrus Mitt; 12' 35' Mark Švets; 16' 42' Dmitri Njatin; 23' Andrei Timofejev; 28' (o.g.) Heigo Plotnik; 53' Maksim Smirnov; 90' Jevgeni Ginzburg	Report	53' Juss Tamming	Stadium: Wismari staadion Attendance: 25; Referee: Kirill Andrejev

20 July 2010	Keila JK	2–5	Tallinna Kotkad	Keila
18:45 EEST (UTC+03)	46' Toomas Kelo; 59' Erkki Kuriks	Report	12' Jürgen Pallo; 41' Tanel Joala; 42' 73' Timo Erkki Huttunen; 89' Lauri Lendsalu	Stadium: Keila Stadium; Attendance: 37; Referee: Erko Kookla

20 July 2010	Navi	0–1	Atli	Võtu
18:45 EEST (UTC+03)		Report	34' Oleg Glivenko	Stadium: Võru Spordikeskuse staadion Attendance: 35; Referee: Maikel Mikson

20 July 2010	JK Kaitseliit Kalev	7–0	FC Velldoris	Kuusalu
18:45 EEST (UTC+03)	2' 75' Meelis Tasa; 26' Anton Kuznetsov; 32' Eerik Heinpalu; 50' Patrik Maldre; (yellow card) 52' Mart Mürkel; 78' Indro Olumets; 80' (pen.) Anton Li	Report	(yellow card) 25' Dmitri Koparev; (yellow card) 39' Valery Sobtšenko; (yellow card) 47' Leonid Latõšev	Stadium: Kuusalu Keskkooli staadion Attendance: 15; Referee: Mart Martin

20 July 2010	Löök	0–0 (a.e.t.) (6–5 p)	Elva II	Kaagvere
18:45 EEST (UTC+03)		Report		Stadium: Kaagvere staadion Attendance: 25; Referee: Vallo Lokko

20 July 2010	Kernu	2–3	aameraaS	Kernu
18:45 EEST (UTC+03)	63' 75' Raigo Abel	Report	4' 73' (pen.) Andre Anis; 47' Andres Lehesoo	Stadium: Kernu Põhikooli staadion Attendance: 10; Referee: Aivar Pohlak

21 July 2010	Lasnamäe Ajax	3–0	Welco Elekter	Tallinn
18:45 EEST (UTC+03)	16' Alexey Zotov; 20' 41' Sergei Kononov	Report		Stadium: Ajaxi staadion Attendance: 40; Referee: Roland Meritee

21 July 2010	Haiba	0–5	Warrior	Saku
18:45 EEST (UTC+03)		Report	13' Oskar Kaldvee; 55' Ivo-Henri Pikkor; 77' Martin Kaarjärv; 81' Karl Ivar Maar; 85' (pen.) Karl Henri Rebane	Stadium: Saku kunstmuru Attendance: 10; Referee: Uno Tutk

21 July 2010	Rakvere	9–0	Püsivus	Rakvere
18:45 EEST (UTC+03)	20' Amor Luup; 60' 61' Taavi Trasberg; 65' Hans Hiiuväin; 72' 76' Reijo Kuusik; 82' 85' 87' Sergei Akimov	Report		Stadium: Rakvere linnastaadion Attendance: 38; Referee: Marger Pormann

21 July 2010	TJK Legion	5–1	Sörve	Tallinn
18:45 EEST (UTC+03)	7' 15' Alexander Pavlikhin; 27' Juri Brõtkin; 70' Jüri Lipsik; 88' Dmitry Popov	Report	50' Jaanis Kriska	Stadium: Wismari staadion Attendance: 12; Referee: Kert Küttis

21 July 2010	Saue Laagri	4–0	Soccernet	Tallinn
18:45 EEST (UTC+03)	16' 34' 45' Carl Sõlg; 64' Lauri Esko	Report		Stadium: Laagri kunstmurustaadion Attendance: 25; Referee: Oleg Grasman

21 July 2010	Rolling Doors	0–5	Otepää	Suure-Jaani
18:45 EEST (UTC+03)		Report	16' 61' 61' 82' Raul Lehismets; 84' Ott Meerits	Stadium: Suure-Jaani Gümnaasiumi staadion Attendance: 62; Referee: Danel Udu

21 July 2010	Rada	8–0	Quattromed	Kuusalu
18:45 EEST (UTC+03)	2' Raido Rebane; 5' Risto Roos; 25' (pen.) 36' 55' 71' Joonas Kröönström; 57' Risto Roos; 82' Margus Kröönström	Report		Stadium: Kuusalu Keskkooli staadion Attendance: 25; Referee: Heiki Luik

21 July 2010	FC Lelle	0–2	Noorus	Lelle
18:45 EEST (UTC+03)		Report	4' 14' Nikolai Roop	Stadium: Lelle staadion Attendance: 50; Referee: Margo Noode

21 July 2010	Warrior II	0–0 (a.e.t.) (4–3 p)	10 Premium	Valga
18:45 EEST (UTC+03)				Stadium: Valga Kungla kunstmuru Attendance: 65

21 July 2010	Kumake	3–1	Metropool	Paide
18:45 EEST (UTC+03)	88' Markus Mats Lellsaar; 89' 90' Alar Arula	Report	10' Hannes Kivilo	Stadium: Paide linnastaadion Attendance: 65; Referee: Dmitri Kägu

21 July 2010	Toompea 1994	4–4 (a.e.t.) (4–5 p)	Kristiine	Tallinn
18:45 EEST (UTC+03)	39' Aaro Mõttus; 65' 96' Priit Kuusk; 87' Priit Järviste	Report	23' Ard Ernits; 34' Sander Talviste; 65' Reiko Keltjärv; 120' Tarmo Randver	Stadium: Maarjamäe staadion Attendance: 6 Referee: Viktor Jasska

21 July 2010	Piraaja	0–1	Lootus II	Tallinn
18:45 EEST (UTC+03)		Report	86' Aleksandr Avdeev	Stadium: Sportland Arena; Attendance: 41; Referee: Erko Kookla

21 July 2010	Kalju III	0–2	Flora U21	Tallinn
20:30 EEST (UTC+03)		Report	15' Priit Danelson; 63' Marten Mütt	Stadium: Hiiu kunstmurustaadion Attendance: 63; Referee: Ainar Kuusk

22 July 2010	Nõmme United	2–1	Orbiit	Tallinn
18:45 EEST (UTC+03)	66' Kevin Paavo; 84' Alex Jelagin	Report	37' Raimond Äri	Stadium: Männiku kunstmuru Attendance: 58; Referee: Neeme Neemlaid

25 July 2010	Visadus	0–6	Sillamäe Kalev II	Tallinn
18:45 EEST (UTC+03)		Report	10' Dmitry Lipartov; 25' Roman Ovtšinnikov; 68' Aleksei Sedov; 72' 90' Kirill Novikov; 90' Anton Orlov	Stadium: Sõle Gümnaasiumi staadion Attendance: 50; Referee: Marto Kiisk

27 July 2010	Keskerakond	2–4	Olympic	Loo
18:45 EEST (UTC+03)	46' Juri Katšan; 89' Oleg Sarantšin	Report	6' Magnar Mikkelsaar; 27' 81' Sven Haas; 36' Rando Tamm	Stadium: Loo kunstmuruväljak Attendance: 10; Referee: Edik Oflyan

31 July 2010	Loo	0–2	Rannamõisa	Loo
19:00 EEST (UTC+03)			63' Märt Mere; 75' Riho Pill	Stadium: Loo kunstmuruväljak Attendance: 20

5 August 2010	Eston Villa	0–2	Premium II	Tallinn
18:45 EEST (UTC+03)			6' Ergo Eessaar; 79' Kristian Uuk	Stadium: Lasnamäe KJH kunstmuru Attendance: 35

=== Teams with bye ===
- A&A Kinnisvara
- Alko
- Ararat-TTÜ
- Aspen
- Emmaste
- Flora
- Ganvix
- HaServ
- Igiliikur
- Jalgpallihaigla
- Järva-Jaani
- Nõmme Kalju
- Kalju II
- Kuressaare
- Levadia
- Lootos
- Luunja
- Paide
- Puuma
- Rakvere II
- Saku
- Saue
- Suema Cargobus
- Tabasalu
- Tallinna Kalev
- Tallinna Kalev III
- Tamme Auto
- Tammeka
- Tammeka II
- Twister
- Tääksi
- Võru

== Second round ==
These matches occurred between 3 August and 4 September 2010.

Team 1	Score	Team 2
3 August
Sillamäe Kalev	6–0	Atli
Paide	0–1	Tulevik
Tabasalu	2–3	HaServ
Tääksi	4–3	JK Kaitseliit Kalev
4 August
Löök	2–3 (a.e.t.)	A&A Kinnisvara
Aspen	0–8	Igiliikur
Saue	3–10	Otepää
KIIU	0–9	Emmaste
Tallinna Kotkad	0–1	Luunja
aameraaS	2–6	Nõmme Kalju
Kumake	0–5	Flora
Raasiku FC Joker	2–0	Lootus II
Noorus	0–3	Kuressaare
Tallinna Kalev	1–0 (a.e.t.)	Levadia
Flora U21	1–3	Sillamäe Kalev II
Saue Laagri	3–0	TJK Legion
5 August
Jalgpallihaigla	1–7	Alko
Rakvere II	8–0	Suema Cargobus
Twister	1–2	Tammeka II
10 August
Tallinna Kalev III	0–7	Narva Trans
Ararat-TTÜ	1–0	Lootus
Olympic	1–8	Tammeka
12 August
Rada	3–6	Lootos
Lasnamäe Ajax	9–0	Järva-Jaani
Saku	1–3	EMÜ SK
18 August
Warrior	0–1	Atletik
Nõmme United	4–0	Warrior II
Rannamõisa	0–4	Tarvastu
19 August
Premium II	0–4	Ganvix
25 August
Kalju II	3–0	Kristiine
26 August
Võru	0–4^{1}	Rakvere
7 September
Tamme Auto	3–2	Puuma

Notes:^{1}This match originally ended 2–4 in favor of Rakvere. Later, it was discovered that Võru had fielded an ineligible player during the match. Therefore, this match was awarded to Rakvere 0–4.

== Third round ==
These matches occurred between 31 August and 7 October 2010.

Team 1	Score	Team 2
31 August
Kuressaare	1–5	Sillamäe Kalev
Flora	5–0	Rakvere II
Alko	2–1	Ararat-TTÜ
2 September
Otepää	1–1 (a.e.t.) (2–3 p)	Lootos
4 September
Nõmme Kalju	0–1	Narva Trans
8 September
EMÜ SK	0–2	Lasnamäe Ajax
Tallinna Kalev	2–0	Luunja
Igiliikur	1–2	Nõmme United
Tammeka II	4–3 (a.e.t.)	Tarvastu
15 September
Tääksi	1–5	Raasiku FC Joker
Tammeka	4–0	Atletik
22 September
Ganvix	3–0	A&A Kinnisvara
Sillamäe Kalev II	3–0	Rakvere
29 September
Kalju II	0–4	Emmaste
Saue Laagri	2–3	Tamme Auto
7 October
HaServ	1–0	Tulevik

== Fourth round ==
The 16 winners from the previous round competed in this stage of the competition. These matches took place between 5 October and 13 November 2010.

Team 1	Score	Team 2
5 October
Tammeka	0–1	Narva Trans
6 October
Tallinna Kalev	2–1	Tammeka II
Flora	4–1	Lootos
Raasiku FC Joker	3–0	Sillamäe Kalev II
14 October
Emmaste	4–0	Alko
20 October
Sillamäe Kalev	12–1	Tamme Auto
27 October
HaServ	1–0	Ganvix
13 November
Lasnamäe Ajax	4–1	Nõmme United

== Quarter-finals ==
The 8 winners from the previous round competed in this stage of the competition. However, before this round took place, Raasiku FC Joker withdrew from the competition, meaning that Flora moved on to the semifinals automatically. These matches took place on 12 and 13 April 2011.

Team 1	Score	Team 2
12 April
HaServ	0–4 (a.e.t.)	Lasnamäe Ajax
Flora	w/o	Raasiku FC Joker
13 April
Narva Trans	1–0 (a.e.t.)	Tallinna Kalev
Emmaste	0–1	Sillamäe Kalev

== Semi-finals ==
The 4 winners from the previous round competed in this stage of the competition.

26 April 2011	Flora	6–0	Lasnamäe Ajax	Tallinn
				Stadium: A. Le Coq Arena

26 April 2011	Sillamäe Kalev	1–1 (16–17 p)	Narva Trans	Sillamäe
				Stadium: Sillamäe Kalevi Stadium

== Final ==
10 May 2011	Narva Trans	0–2	Flora	Tallinn
19:45 UTC+3			48' Markus Jürgenson; 78' Alo Dupikov	Stadium: A. Le Coq Arena; Attendance: 390; Referee: Hannes Kaasik
