= 2010 in Estonian football =

The 2010 season in Estonian football, started January 2010 and ended December 2010:

== Honours ==
=== Official titles ===
Title	Team	Reason
Estonian Champions 2010	FC Flora Tallinn	Winners of Meistriliiga
Estonian Cup Winners 2009–10	FC Levadia Tallinn	Winners of Estonian Cup

=== Other competition winners ===
Competition	Team
Esiliiga 2010	FC Levadia Tallinn II
Second League East/North 2010	FC Puuma Tallinn
Second League South/West 2010	FC HaServ Tartu
Third League East 2010	JK Sillamäe Kalev II
Third League North 2010	FC Olympic Tallinn
Third League West 2010	JK Luunja
Third League South 2010	Paide Kumake
Fourth League East 2010	FC Flora Rakvere II
Fourth League North 2010	Trummi SK
Fourth League West 2010	JK Liverpool Pub
Fourth League South 2010	JK Visadus
Estonian SuperCup 2010	FC Levadia Tallinn
Estonian Small Cup 2009–10	HÜJK Emmaste

== Domestic results ==
=== 2010 Meistriliiga ===
Pos	Team	Pld	W	D	L	GF	GA	GD	Pts	Qualification or relegation
1	Flora (C)	36	29	4	3	104	32	+72	91	Qualification for Champions League second qualifying round
2	Levadia	36	26	8	2	100	16	+84	86	Qualification for Europa League second qualifying round
3	Narva Trans	36	23	7	6	67	31	+36	76	Qualification for Europa League first qualifying round (Note: Champions-League qualified Flora won the cup against Trans, so Levadia will qualify for the second qualifying round. Trans and Kalju took the first qualifying round spots.)
4	Kalju	36	18	8	10	59	42	+17	62	Qualification for Europa League first qualifying round
5	Sillamäe Kalev	36	18	5	13	79	52	+27	59	
6	Tammeka	36	11	7	18	50	66	−16	40	
7	Tulevik	36	8	5	23	33	62	−29	29	
8	Paide Linnameeskond	36	6	7	23	30	79	−49	25	
9	Kuressaare	36	7	3	26	32	93	−61	24	Qualification for relegation play-offs
10	Lootus (R)	36	6	2	28	22	103	−81	20	Relegated to Esiliiga

Source: Estonian Football Association (in Estonian)
Rules for classification: 1st points; 2nd least withdrawals or annulled matches; 3rd overall wins; 4th head-to-head points; 5th head-to-head goal difference; 6th goal difference; 7th goals scored.
If two or more teams on the top have the same number of points by the end of the season, the aforementioned rules will not apply and additional game(s) will be played to determine the champions.
(C) Champions; (R) Relegated

==== Qualification play-off ====
14 November 2010	Tamme Auto	2–1	Kuressaare	Sportland Arena, Tallinn
13:00 EET EET (UTC+02)	Erik Šteinberg 58'; Dmitri Kirilov 79'	Report	14' Rene Aljas	Attendance: 70; Referee: Mart Martin

20 November 2010	Kuressaare	3–0	Tamme Auto	Salme stadium, Salme Parish
13:00 EET EET (UTC+02)	Dmitri Skiperski 27'; Sander Viira 31'; Martti Pukk 36'	Report		Attendance: 32; Referee: Martin Salong

=== Estonian Cup ===
==== 2009–10 ====
11 May 2010	Flora	0–3	Levadia	Kadriorg stadium, Tallinn
18:45 EEST (UTC+03)		Report	33' Andero Pebre; 61' Vitali Leitan; 72' Artjom Dmitrijev	Attendance: 950; Referee: Margus Kotter

=== 2010 Supercup ===
6 March 2010	Levadia (CH)	2–0	(CW) Flora	Sportland Arena, Tallinn
17:00 EET (UTC+02)	Igor Morozov 56'; Eino Puri 82'	Report		Attendance: 345; Referee: Sten Kaldma
