= III liiga =

Estonian football league

- Country: Estonia
- Confederation: UEFA
- Divisions: III north III east III west III south
- Number of clubs: 48 (12 in each division)
- Level on pyramid: 5
- Promotion to: II liiga
- Relegation to: IV liiga
- Domestic cup(s): Estonian Cup; Estonian Small Cup
- Current champions: Tallinna FC Hell Hunt (2025)

III liiga is the fifth-highest football league arranged by the Estonian Football Association. It consists of 48 teams, divided geographically into four divisions with 12 teams in each group north, east, west and south. The season starts around April and lasts until October.

== III liiga North ==
=== Current clubs ===
The following clubs were competing in III Liiga North during the 2018 season.

Club	2025	Seasons in III Liiga	First season in III Liiga	Current run since	Titles	Last best finish
Türi Ganvix JK	2nd	3	2022	2022	0	2nd (2025)
	6th	2	2017	2017	0	6th (2017)
Zenit	III Liiga West 7th	3	2016	2016	0	5th (2016)
Kalju III	10th	6	2008	2014	0	5th (2015)
TransferWise	IV Liiga North/West 3rd	1	2018	2018	0	-
Štrommi	12th	11	2006	2015	0	5th (2012)
Saku	9th	8	2001	2014	0	9th (2015)
Eston Villa	5th	4	2012	2016	0	7th (2013)
Hell Hunt	2nd	7	2008	2016	0	8th (2012)
Dünamo	II Liiga North/East 6th	2	2002	2018	1	1st (2002)
Harju	8th	13	2004	2012	1	1st (2010)
Zapoos	IV Liiga North/East 4th	1	2018	2018	0	-

== III liiga East ==
=== Current clubs ===
The following clubs were competing in III Liiga North during the 2016 season.

Club	2015	Seasons in III Liiga	First season in III Liiga	Current run since	Titles	Last best finish
Maardu United ^{a, b}	3rd	1	2015	2015	0	3rd (2015)
Koeru ^{a}	4th	14	2001	2014	0	3rd (2010)
Maardu LM II ^{a, b}	5th	1	2015	2015	0	5th (2015)
Kaitseliit Kalev ^{a}	6th	4	2005	2015	1	1st (2007)
Järva-Jaani ^{a, b}	7th	11	2005	2005	0	3rd (2005)
Loo	8th	3	2009	2015	0	4th (2012)
Tarvas II ^{a, b}	9th	5	2011	2011	0	3rd (2011)
Infonet III ^{a, b}	IV Liiga East 1st	0	2016	2016	0	–
Väätsa ^{a, b}	IV Liiga East 3rd	0	2016	2016	0	–
Ambla ^{a, b}	11th	3	2013	2013	0	6th (2013)
Harju ^{a, b}	?	0	2016	2016	0	–
Järve II ^{a, b}	?	0	2016	2016	0	–

^{a} – never been relegated from III Liiga
^{b} – never played in II Liiga

== III liiga South ==
=== Current clubs ===
The following clubs were competing in III Liiga South during the 2016 season.

Club	2015	Seasons in III Liiga	First season in III Liiga	Current run since	Titles	Last best finish
Otepää ^{a, b}	3rd	7	2009	2009	0	3rd (2015)
EMÜ ^{a, b}	4th	6	2010	2010	0	4th (2015)
Lootos ^{b}	5th	15	1995/96	2007	0	3rd (2010)
Tääksi ^{a, b}	6th	4	2012	2012	0	3rd (2014)
Welco II ^{a, b}	7th	2	2014	2014	0	5th (2014)
Tartu ^{a, b}	8th	3	2013	2013	0	7th (2013)
Navi ^{a, b}	9th	5	2011	2011	0	9th (2015)
Tarvastu ^{a}	IV Liiga South 1st	7	1995/96	2016	1	1st (1999)
Suure-Jaani United ^{b}	IV Liiga South 2nd	1	2012	2016	0	11th (2012)
Warrior	10th	7	1995/96	2012	0	2nd (2004)
Fauna	11th	9	2001	2015	1	1st (2001)
Vastseliina ^{a, b}	12th	2	2014	2014	0	12th (2015)

^{a} – never been relegated from III Liiga
^{b} – never played in II Liiga

== III liiga West ==
=== Current clubs ===
The following clubs were competing in III Liiga South during the 2016 season.

Club	2015	Seasons in III Liiga	First season in III Liiga	Current run since	Titles	Last best finish
Kärdla LM ^{a}	2nd	9	2006	2014	0	2nd (2015)
Haapsalu ^{a}	3rd	2	2013	2015	0	3rd (2015)
Lihula ^{a, b}	5th	3	2013	2013	0	5th (2015)
Alexela ^{b}	6th	8	2002	2014	0	2nd (2005)
Kernu ^{a}	9th	13	2000	2009	1	1st (2002)
Poseidon ^{a, b}	IV Liiga East 1st	0	2016	2016	0	–
Pärnu Vaprus ^{a}	IV Liiga East 2nd	3	1998	2016	1	1st (2000)
Zenit ^{a}	IV Liiga East 3rd	0	2016	2016	0	–
Lelle	10th	6	2002	2013	0	3rd (2014)
Raplamaa ^{a, b}	?	0	2016	2016	0	–
Nõmme United II ^{a, b}	?	0	2016	2016	0	–
Ajax II ^{a, b}	?	0	2016	2016	0	–

^{a} – never been relegated from III Liiga
^{b} – never played in II Liiga

== Champions and top goalscorers ==
=== North division ===
Season	1st place, gold medalist(s)	2nd place, silver medalist(s)	3rd place, bronze medalist(s)	Top Goalscorer
1995/96	Tallinna Devia	Muuga Sadam	Kopli SK	
1996/97	Kopli SK	Maardu FS Junior	Kalevi ÜJP Jägala	
1997/98	FC M.C. Tallinn	Nõmme JK Kalju	Maardu FS Junior	Veiko Murumaa (Maardu FS Junior, 14 goals)
1998	Lasnamäe JK	Nõmme JK Kalju	Muuga Sadam	Karl Lepist (Nõmme JK Kalju, 14 goals)
1999	Maardu FS Junior	Tallinna Jalgpallikool	Nõmme JK Kalju	Lauri Kiviloo (Nõmme JK Kalju, 21 goals)
2000	TJK-83 Tallinn	Tallinna Jalgpallikool	Tallinna FC Feeling	Veniamin Levin (Tallinna SK ESS, 17 goals)
2001	FC M.C. Tallinn	Tallinna FC Ajax	Tallinna SK ESS	Ott Purje (FC M.C. Tallinn, 22 goals)
2002	Tallinna JK Dünamo	Tallinna SC Real	Tallinna Fortuna	Sergei Dmitrijev (FC Puuma Tallinn, 20 goals)
2003	JK Tallinna Kalev	FC Ajax Estel-85	Eesti Telefoni SK	Vitali Kosterev (JK Tallinna Kalev, 20 goals)
2004	FC Elion	Nõmme JK Kalju	Tallinna LiVal Sport	Markko Kudu (Tallinna FC Olympic, 20 goals)
2005	JK Tondi	Keskerakonna JK	Tallinna LiVal Sport	Andrei Tšurikov (JK Tondi, 27 goals)
2006	Tallinna FC Ararat	Nõmme JK Kalju II	Tallinna JK Piraaja	Andrei Tšurikov (JK Tondi, 23 goals)
2007	SK Tallinna Sport	Keskerakonna JK	Saue JK	Janar Pajo (Saue JK, 23 goals)
2008	Keskerakonna JK	Tallinna JK Piraaja	Tallinna JK II	Kirill Abramov (Tallinna LiVal Sport, 21 goals)
2009	FC Ajax Veteranid	JK Tondi	Tallinna JK Legion II	Andrei Kobjakov (FC Ajax Veteranid, 20 goals)
2010	Tallinna FC Olympic	Tallinna JK Piraaja	Koeru JK	Rando Tamm (Tallinna FC Olympic, 20 goals)
2011	Tallinna FC Ararat TTÜ (2)	Saue JK Laagri	JK Tallinna Kalev III	Marion Adusoo (Koeru JK, 19 goals)
2012	FCF Tallinna Ülikool	Saue JK Laagri	JK Tallinna Kalev III	Even Laanemaa (FCF Tallinna Ülikool, 21 goals)
2013	Paide Linnameeskond II	JK Tallinna Kalev III	JK Tondi	Aleksei Naariste (JK Tallinna Kalev III, 26 goals)
2014	Tallinna JK Piraaja	Tallinna FC Charma	JK Retro	Dmitry Skiperskiy (JK Retro, 54 goals)
2015	JK Retro	JK Tallinna Kalev III	Tallinna SK Dnipro	Dmitry Skiperskiy (JK Retro, 45 goals)
2016	Pirita Reliikvia	Tallinna FC Hell Hunt	JK Retro	Dmitry Skiperskiy (JK Retro, 30 goals)
2017	Põhja-Tallinna JK Volta	Tallinna FC Hell Hunt	JK Tallinna Kalev III	Ian-Erik Valge (Põhja-Tallinna JK Volta, 34 goals)
2018	JK Retro (2)	Tallinna FC Zapoos	Harju JK Laagri	Dmitry Skiperskiy (JK Retro, 41 goals)

=== East division ===
Season	1st place, gold medalist(s)	2nd place, silver medalist(s)	3rd place, bronze medalist(s)	Top Goalscorer
1995/96	Kohtla-Järve Veteranid	FC Rakvere	Tapa Fortuna	
1996/97	Kiviõli JK Irbis	Tapa Fortuna	FC Rakvere	
1997/98	Narva Baltika	SK Tapa	Kehra Tempori	Aleksandr Kolossov (SK Tapa, 10 goals)
1998	Kohtla-Järve JK Alko	Kohtla-Järve SK Järve	SK Tapa	Sergei Akimov (SK Tapa, 9 goals)
1999	Tallinna FC Puuma	Kohtla-Järve SK Järve	Kolgaküla SK Rada/HKL	Sergei Akimov (SK Tapa, 14 goals)
2000	Narva Kick Sai	Jõhvi JK Orbiit	Sillamäe JK Kalev Junior	Vitali Belski (Narva Kick Sai, 10 goals)
2001	Tallinna SK Dvigatel	FC Viimsi	Kohtla-Järve JK Alko	Tarmo Kink (FC Viimsi, 31 goals)
2002	Kuusalu SK Rada	Jõhvi JK Orbiit	Paide JK	Aleksandr Avdeev (Kiviõli Tamme Auto, 28 goals)
2003	JK Voka	Tallinna JK II	FC Ajax Estel-86	Aleksandr Avdeev (JK Voka, 38 goals)
2004	JK Sillamäe Kalev	Narva JK Trans II	FC Ajax Estel II	Aleksandr Avdeev (JK Voka, 33 goals)
2005	Jõhvi JK Orbiit	Lasnamäe FC Ajax II	Virumaa JK Rakvere	Pavel Kondratjev (JK Voka, 30 goals)
2006	Kiviõli Tamme Auto	Virumaa JK Rakvere	Kuusalu SK Rada	Eerik Heinpalu (Kaitsejõudude SK, 28 goals)
2007	Kohtla-Järve JK Alko	Tallinna FC Anzhi	Maardu Esteve	Tõnis Starkopf (Maardu Esteve, 43 goals)
2008	FC M.C. Tallinn	Operi Jalgpallikool	Maardu Esteve	Tõnis Starkopf (Maardu Esteve, 23 goals)
2009	Tallinna FC Atletik	Raasiku FC Joker	Maardu Esteve	Maksim Krivošein (Maardu Esteve, 34 goals)
2010	JK Sillamäe Kalev II	Tallinna JK Kotkad	FC Maardu	Maksim Krivošein (FC Maardu, 29 goals)
2011	FC Maardu	Kuusalu JK Rada	Rakvere JK Tarvas II	3 players (19 goals)
2012	Raasiku FC Joker 1993	JK Keskerakond	Lasnamäe FC Ajax II	Andrei Kobjakov (Lasnamäe FC Ajax II, 22 goals)
2013	Jõhvi FC Lokomotiv II	Tallinna JK Visadus	Tallinna FC Levadia III	Raido Vespere (FCF Järva-Jaani SK, 26 goals)
2014	Kuusalu JK Rada	Narva United FC	Kiviõli FC Irbis II	Sergei Popov (Kiviõli FC Irbis II, 28 goals)
2015	Tallinna FC Forza	Narva United FC	Maardu United	Jevgeni Tšigrinov (Tallinna FC Forza, 46 goals)
2016	Maardu United	Tallinna FC Infonet III	Kohtla-Järve JK Järve II	Sergei Akimov (Ambla Vallameeskond, 27 goals)
2017	Paide Linnameeskond III	FCI Tallinn III	JK Väätsa Vald	Vitas Mališauskas (FCI Tallinn III and Rauno Rikberg (Paide Linnameeskond III, 25 goals)
2018	Viimsi JK II	JK Loo	Lasnamäe FC Ajax II	Andrei Kobjakov (Lasnamäe FC Ajax II, 22 goals)

=== West division ===
Season	1st place, gold medalist(s)	2nd place, silver medalist(s)	3rd place, bronze medalist(s)	Top Goalscorer
1995/96	Kärdla JK	Märjamaa Kompanii	FC Haapsalu	
1996/97	Kuusalu SK Rada/HKL	Rapla JK Atli	FC Haapsalu	
1997/98	FC Kuressaare	Rapla JK Atli	1. FC Tallinn	Toivo Alt (FC Kuressaare, 10 goals)
1998	Kehtna FC Flora	Järvamaa JK	Pärnu JK II	Aleksander Saharov (Kehtna FC Flora, 9 goals)
1999	Võhma Olümpia	Järvamaa JK/Arieks	Pärnu JK/Vapper	Ahti Klamp (Võhma Olümpia, 14 goals)
2000	Pärnu JK/Vapper	Märjamaa Kompanii	Keila JK	Aivar Israel (Keila JK, 10 goals)
2001	Märjamaa Kompanii	Keila JK Alibi	FC Kose	Jaanus Põllumees (FC Hansa United, 31 goals)
2002	FC Kernu Kadakas	FC Kose	Pakri SK Paldiski	Aivar Israel (Keila JK Alibi, 28 goals)
2003	Lelle SK	FC Kose	Tabasalu Palliklubi	Mihail Ištšuk (Lelle SK, 38 goals)
2004	Märjamaa Kompanii	FC Kose	Tabasalu Palliklubi	Marek Tiik (Märjamaa Kompanii, 33 goals)
2005	JK Tallinna Kalev II	Pakri SK Paldiski	JK Kernu Kadakas	Andrei Štukin (JK Tallinna Kalev II, 30 goals)
2006	Tabasalu Palliklubi	JK Kernu Kadakas	FC Haiba	Raigo Abel (JK Kernu Kadakas, 28 goals)
2007	JK Kaitseliit Kalev	Pärnu SK Kalev	FC Haapsalu	Aleksandr Vassiljev (FC Haapsalu, 43 goals)
2008	FC Toompea	Rummu Dünamo	FC Risti	Atko Väikmeri (FC Toompea, 23 goals)
2009	Rummu Dünamo	FC Haiba	FC Kose	Reimo Berkmann (Kärdla LM, 34 goals)
2010	Paide Kumake	FC Kose	Kehtna FC Flora	Tanel Oeselg (Kehtna FC Flora, 29 goals)
2011	Vändra JK Vaprus	Keila JK	Saaremaa JK aameraaS	Dmitri Skiperski (Eesti Koondis, 22 goals))
2012	Eesti Koondis	Rummu Dünamo	Pärnu FC Metropool	Dmitri Skiperski (Eesti Koondis, 22 goals)
2013	JK Retro	JK Kernu Kadakas	Viimsi MRJK	Dmitri Skiperski (JK Retro, 26 goals)
2014	FC Kose	Saaremaa JK aameraaS	FC Lelle	Ülari Tohver (JK Pärnu-Jaagupi, 28 goals)
2015	Pärnu Jalgpalliklubi	Kärdla LM	Läänemaa JK Haapsalu	Vladislav Šikirjavõi (Läänemaa JK Haapsalu, 46 goals)
2016	Raplamaa JK	Pärnu JK Vaprus	FC Nõmme United II	Robert Veskimäe (FC Nõmme United II, 27 goals)
2017	Pärnu JK Poseidon	Tallinna FC Castovanni Eagles	Läänemaa JK	Andres Dobõšev-Proosväli (Läänemaa JK, 30 goals)
2018	FC Kose (2)	Põhja-Tallinna JK Volta II	Saue JK	Pelle Pohlak (FC Kose, 32 goals)

=== South division ===
Season	1st place, gold medalist(s)	2nd place, silver medalist(s)	3rd place, bronze medalist(s)	Top Goalscorer
1995/96	Võhma Linnameeskond	Valga FC Warrior	Viljandi MSK	
1996/97	Põltsamaa JK Sport	Võru JK Kalev	Viljandi MSK	
1997/98	Viljandi JK Tulevik II	Põltsamaa JK Sport	Tarvastu JK	Mark Orav (Viljandi JK Tulevik II, 11 goals)
1998	Põltsamaa JK Sport	Tarvastu JK	JK Karksi	Üllar Kütt (Põltsamaa JK Sport, 12 goals)
1999	Tarvastu JK	Võru JK Kalev	Tartu Jalgpallikool	Valeri Kuragin (Võru JK Kalev, 17 goals)
2000	Tartu JK Tammeka	JK Karksi	Viljandi PT	Vitali Gussev (Tartu JK Tammeka, 22 goals)
2001	Tartu TÜ/Fauna	Tarvastu JK	Võru SK Silja Sport	Egon Parve (Koeru SK, 17 goals)
2002	FC Valga II	Tarvastu JK	Võhma Linnameeskond	Eston Kurvits (Võru JK, 14 goals)
2003	Tartu JK Olümpia-2000	JK Karksi	Pärnu Pataljoni JK	Artur Ossipov (Tartu JK Olümpia-2000, 20 goals)
2004	Pärnu Pataljoni JK	Valga FC Warrior	Koeru SK	Egon Parve (Koeru SK, 17 goals)
2005	Tartu Välk 494	Tartu TÜ/Fauna	FCF Järva-Jaani SK	Egon Parve (Koeru SK, 22 goals)
2006	Paide FC Flora	Võru JK	Tartu JK Tammeka II	Rauno Rikberg (Paide FC Flora, 48 goals)
2007	Türi Ganvix JK	Viljandi JK Kodugaas	Jõgeva SK Tähe	Ergo Eelmäe (Türi Ganvix JK, 30 goals)
2008	Tartu FC Metec	Tartu SK 10 Premium	Põlva FC Lootos	Alar Alve (Põlva FC Lootos, 37 goals)
2009	Tartu FC HaServ	JK Luunja	FC Otepää	Alar Alve (Põlva FC Lootos, 32 goals)
2010	JK Luunja	Viljandi JK Kotkad	Põlva FC Lootos	Robert Pluum (JK Luunja, 22 goals)
2011	FC Elva	Jõgeva SK Noorus-96	Võru JK	Mairo Tikerberi (Jõgeva SK Noorus-96, 28 goals)
2012	Tartu Quattromed	Jõgeva SK Noorus-96	Viljandi JK Tulevik II	Ivar Sova (Tartu Quattromed, 33 goals)
2013	Võru JK	Viljandi JK Tulevik Vanakesed	FC Otepää	Maksim Mitrofanov (FC Tartu, 22 goals)
2014	Tõrva JK	SK Imavere Forss	SK Tääksi	Oliver Suur (Tõrva JK, 28 goals)
2015	Tartu FC Merkuur	Tartu FC Santos II	FC Otepää	2 players, (22 goals)
2016	FC Otepää	FC Tarvastu	Vastseliina FC Tannem	Raul Lehismets (FC Otepää, 29 goals)
2017	Tartu JK Welco II	FC Tarvastu	FC Vastseliina	Reimo Ojala (Tartu JK Tammeka U19, 24 goals)
2018	Põhja-Sakala	SK Imavere	FC Tarvastu	Rasmus Alles (Viljandi JK Tulevik III, 30 goals)

== III liiga finals ==
=== III liiga Finals 2012 ===
10 October 2012 Semi-Final	Eesti Koondis	3–2	Tartu Quattromed	Tallinn, Estonia
20:30	Aivar Priidel 57'; Martin Taska 81'; Arvo Kraam 85'	(Report)	Taavi Vellemaa 46', 69'	Stadium: Sportland Arena; Attendance: 20; Referee: Aivar Israel

14 October 2012 Semi-Final	FCF Tallinna Ülikool	3–1	Raasiku FC Joker 1993	Tallinn, Estonia
14:00	Even Laanemaa 40'; Rauno Nõmmiko 45'; Steven Linkov 72' (o.g.)	(Report)	Ervo Vaatmann 61'	Stadium: Sportland Arena; Attendance: 68; Referee: Martin Salong

28 October 2012 Final	Eesti Koondis	3–1	FCF Tallinna Ülikool	Tallinn, Estonia
17:00	Dmitry Skiperskiy 31'; Arvo Kraam 46'; Mait Anton 73'	(Report)	Rauno Nõmmiko 44'	Stadium: Sportland Arena; Referee: Aron Härsing

=== III liiga Finals 2013 ===
20 October 2013 Semi-Final	Paide Linnameeskond II	3–2	Jõhvi FC Lokomotiv II	Paide, Estonia
13:00	Chris Lee 20'; Rene Puhke 36'; Silver Neemelo 39'	(Report)	Vitali Mletško 18'; Jevgeni Gužovski 43'	Stadium: Paide Stadium; Attendance: 25; Referee: Reigo Teearu

20 October 2013 Semi-Final	Võru JK	3–3 (4–2 p)	JK Retro	Võru, Estonia
14:00	Lauri Pilv 12', 62'; Taavi Sarapuu 78'	(Report)	Dmitry Skiperskiy 16', 24', 87'	Stadium: Võru Stadium; Attendance: 42; Referee: Siim Rinken

31 October 2013 Final	Paide Linnameeskond II	1–2 (a.e.t.)	Võru JK	Tallinn, Estonia
20:30	Rene Puhke 69'	(Report)	Kristjan Moks 25'; Priit Bahmatšov 96'	Stadium: Sportland Arena; Attendance: 45; Referee: Martin Lember

=== III liiga Finals 2014 ===
18 October 2014 Semi-Final	Tõrva JK	6–1	FC Kose	Tarvastu, Estonia
14:00	Oliver Suur 6', 73'; Juhan Kondike 10', 85'; Martin Orlo 79'; Andreas Orlo 88'	(Report)	Lauri Mihkelson 60' (pen.)	Stadium: Soe Stadium; Attendance: 25; Referee: Marko Liiva

19 October 2014 Semi-Final	Kuusalu JK Rada	1–2	Tallinna JK Piraaja	Kuusalu, Estonia
12:00	Keio Kivistik 63'	(Report)	Tanel Lätti 9'; Leo Kuuse 59' (pen.)	Stadium: Kuusalu Stadium; Attendance: 22; Referee: Margus Kotter

25 October 2014 Final	Tallinna JK Piraaja	2–1	Tõrva JK	Tallinn, Estonia
13:00	Leo Kuuse 10'; Heigo Kosemets 48' (o.g.)	(Report)	Karl Hansson 66'	Stadium: Sportland Arena; Attendance: 40; Referee: Denis Petrov

=== III liiga Finals 2015 ===
17 October 2015 Semi-Final	Tallinna FC Forza	4–3	JK Retro	Tallinn, Estonia
11:00	Jevgeni Tšigrinov 18'; Andrei Nazarov 52'; Jevgeni Suhih 65', 82'	(Report)	Dmitry Skiperskiy 80'; Arvo Kraam 83'; Lars Christian Hopp 91'	Stadium: Lasnamäe KJH Stadium; Attendance: 17; Referee: Tomi Rahula

18 October 2015 Semi-Final	Tartu FC Merkuur	2–3	Pärnu Jalgpalliklubi	Tartu, Estonia
13:00	Vladislav Gussev 21', 46'	(Report)	Igor Mohhov 32'; Kein Makovei 41', 68'	Stadium: Kaagvere Stadium; Attendance: 12; Referee: Riivo Stolts

24 October 2015 Final	Pärnu Jalgpalliklubi	3–1	Tallinna FC Forza	Pärnu, Estonia
13:00	Aleksander Algo 34'; Kein Makovei 60'; Henri Hansson 74'	(Report)	Andrei Nazarov 90'	Stadium: Pärnu kunstmurustaadion Attendance: 67; Referee: Ago Kärtmann

=== III liiga Finals 2016 ===
15 October 2016 Semi-Final	Raplamaa JK	6–0	FC Otepää	Valtu, Estonia
18:00	Tanel Oeselg 60', 79'; Viljo Sinikas 62'; Ravel Toome 69'; Kristjan Nõulik 86'; Kaupo Kantsik 88'	(Report)		Stadium: Valtu Stadium; Attendance: 21; Referee: Ander Hindremäe

16 October 2016 Semi-Final	Maardu United	4–1	Pirita JK Reliikvia	Maardu, Estonia
13:00	Nikolai Gretšits 19'; Juri Javljanski 76'; Denis Pavlov 89'; Dmitri Kravtsov 90+1'	(Report)	Marion Adusoo 26'	Stadium: Maardu Stadium; Attendance: 30; Referee: Urmo Visnapuu

22 October 2016 Final	Raplamaa JK	4–1	Maardu United	Rapla, Estonia
14:00	Oliver Andres 9', 23'; Teet Kallaste 64'; Tanel Oeselg 88'	(Report)	Juri Javljanski 79'	Stadium: Rapla Ühisgümnaasiumi staadion Attendance: 20; Referee: Kristo Värva

=== III liiga Finals 2017 ===
15 October 2017 Semi-Final	Pärnu JK Poseidon	3–2	Tartu JK Welco II	Pärnu, Estonia
12:00	Anton Issakov 7'; Lauri Lilleste 24'; Romek Kašulin 81'	(Report)	Alvar Rämman 51'; Taavi Haljak 65'	Stadium: Pärnu kunstmurustaadion Attendance: 32; Referee: Aleksei Latõnin

15 October 2017 Semi-Final	Paide Linnameeskond III	11–1	Põhja-Tallinna JK Volta	Paide, Estonia
13:00	Volodja Erdei 3', 24'; Ervin Kõll 18'; Chris Lee 19'; Rauno Rikberg 26', 37', 41', 75', 82'; Andre Mägi 61', 74'	(Report)	Evgeny Bnatov 83'	Stadium: Paide linnastaadion Attendance: 56; Referee: Andres Jahimaa

21 October 2017 Final	Paide Linnameeskond III	2–0	Pärnu JK Poseidon	Paide, Estonia
14:00	Taavi Laurits 19'; Volodja Erdei 30'	(Report)		Stadium: Paide linnastaadion Attendance: 73; Referee: Rait Ojanurme

=== III liiga Finals 2018 ===
21 October 2018 Semi-Final	Viimsi JK II	2–1	JK Retro	Viimsi, Estonia
13:30	Raoul Rocco Riigov 67'; Karl-Erik Lõhmus 83'	Report	Dmitry Skiperskiy 35'	Stadium: Viimsi KK staadion Attendance: 27; Referee: Karl Koppel

21 October 2018 Semi-Final	FC Kose	1–3	Põhja-Sakala	Oru, Estonia
13:00	Mikk Rajaver 57'	Report	Riho Domberg 32'; Sten Kase 68', 90+3'	Stadium: Oru Põhikooli staadion Attendance: 37; Referee: Viljar Pennert

27 October 2018 Final	Viimsi JK II	0–2	Põhja-Sakala	Viimsi, Estonia
12:00		Report	Kristo Kalistratov 63' (pen.); Olger Vorobjov 85'	Stadium: Viimsi KK staadion Attendance: 36; Referee: Paul Kask
