= Tallinna FC Castovanni Eagles =

Estonian football club

- Founded: 2010
- Ground: Sportland Arena
- Capacity: 540
- Manager: Märt Vassiljev
- 2017: III Liiga West, 2nd
Home colours	Away colours

Tallinna FC Castovanni Eagles is an Estonian football club based in Tallinn. Founded in 2010, they currently play in the III Liiga, the fifth tier of Estonian football. Tallinna FC Soccernet is their reserve team.

== Players ==
=== Current squad ===
As of 24 July 2017.

Note: Flags indicate national team as defined under FIFA eligibility rules; some limited exceptions apply. Players may hold more than one non-FIFA nationality.

No.	Pos.	Nation	Player
1	GK	EST	Jaak Paavel
5	DF	EST	Martin Kivi
7	MF	EST	Kaarel Anton
8	MF	EST	Rainer Põld
10	FW	EST	Aleksei Naariste
13	MF	EST	Tanel Joala
17	MF	EST	Rando Hallkivi
19	DF	EST	Kaupo Tenno
25	FW	EST	Richard Leht
39	DF	EST	Timo Erkki Huttunen
50	MF	EST	Lauri Lendsalu
77	FW	EST	Gerd Ärsis

No.	Pos.	Nation	Player
80	DF	EST	Rain Ikla
92	FW	EST	Mihkel Eimla
98	DF	EST	Tarmo Erik Huttunen
—	MF	EST	Enari Laino
—	MF	EST	Taavi Laja
—	MF	EST	Jan Lõssanov
—	FW	EST	Karl-Erik Puolokainen
—	MF	EST	Randar Päll
—	DF	EST	Rammo Rannu
—	GK	EST	Hasan Steinberg
—	GK	EST	Marek Tiido
—	DF	EST	Martin Treufeld

== Statistics ==
=== League and Cup ===
Season	Division	Pos	Teams	Pld	W	D	L	GF	GA	GD	Pts	Top Goalscorer	Estonian Cup	Notes
2010	IV Liiga E	10	12	22	5	4	13	23	78	-55	19	Rasmus Sinivee (8)	Second Round	as Tallinna JK Suema Cargobus
2011	IV Liiga E	10	12	22	6	3	13	31	56	-24	21	Oskar Pedosk (6)	Second Round	as Tallinna JK Suema Cargobus
2012	IV Liiga E	6	12	22	8	6	8	36	53	-17	30	Oskar Pedosk (10)	First Round	as Tallinna JK Suema Cargobus
2013	IV Liiga N	3	11	20	13	2	5	64	24	+40	41	Karl Karimõisa (18)	First Round	as Tallinna JK Suema Cargobus
2014	III Liiga N	7	12	22	9	7	6	43	34	+9	34	Jesper Puusepp (7)	First Round	as Tallinna FC Castovanni Eagles
2015	III Liiga N	4	12	22	12	3	7	70	38	+32	39	Aleksei Naariste (20)	First Round	as Tallinna FC Castovanni Eagles
2016	III Liiga N	5	12	22	12	4	6	45	31	+14	40	Aleksei Naariste (10)	Second Round	as Tallinna FC Castovanni Eagles
2017	III Liiga W	2	12	22	16	2	4	70	33	+37	50	Richard Leht (16)	Second Round	as Tallinna FC Castovanni Eagles
