= Deniss Tjapkin =

Estonian footballer

Personal information
- Full name: Deniss Tjapkin
- Date of birth: 30 January 1991 (age 35)
- Place of birth: Kohtla-Järve, then part of Estonian SSR, Soviet Union
- Height: 1.98 m (6 ft 6 in)
- Positions: Centre back; defensive midfielder

Team information
- Current team: Maardu Linnameeskond
- Number: 27

Youth career
- 2002–2003: Jõhvi
- 2005–2007: Alko
- 2008–2009: Sillamäe Kalev

Senior career*
Years	Team	Apps	(Gls)
2008–2012	Alko	68	(10)
2011	Orbiit	6	(0)
2011–2012	Lootus	63	(5)
2013–2014	Sillamäe Kalev II	12	(3)
2013–2016	Sillamäe Kalev	130	(5)
2017–2021	Nõmme Kalju	129	(8)
2022	FC Tallinn	9	(0)
2023	Jõhvi Phoenix	6	(1)
2023–	Maardu Linnameeskond	27	(3)

International career^{‡}
2013–2014	Estonia U23	3	(0)
2017	Estonia	2	(0)
- * Club domestic league appearances and goals as of 24 July 2026 ‡ National team caps and goals as of 19 November 2018

Deniss Tjapkin (born 30 January 1991) is an Estonian professional footballer who plays as a centre back for Estonian Esiliiga club Maardu Linnameeskond.

== International career ==
Tjapkin made his senior international debut for Estonia on 19 November 2017, in a 2–0 away victory against Fiji in a friendly.

== Honours ==
=== Club ===
Nõmme Kalju

- Meistriliiga: 2018
