= Oleksandr Sukharov =

Ukrainian footballer

Personal information
- Full name: Oleksandr Yuriyovych Sukharov
- Date of birth: 18 February 1994 (age 32)
- Place of birth: Druzhkivka, Ukraine
- Height: 1.82 m (6 ft 0 in)
- Position: Right-back

Team information
- Current team: Kramatorsk
- Number: 43

Youth career
- 2007–2011: Shakhtar Donetsk

Senior career*
Years	Team	Apps	(Gls)
2011–2013	Shakhtar-3 Donetsk	19	(0)
2013–2016	Zorya Luhansk	0	(0)
2016–2018	Sillamäe Kalev	42	(3)
2017	→ Sillamäe Kalev U21	3	(2)
2018	Paide Linnameeskond	12	(1)
2018–	Kramatorsk	47	(0)

International career^{‡}
2010–2011	Ukraine U17	7	(0)
- * Club domestic league appearances and goals as of 19 December 2021 ‡ National team caps and goals as of 19 December 2021

Oleksandr Yuriyovych Sukharov (Ukrainian: Олександр Юрійович Сухаров; born 18 February 1994) is a Ukrainian professional footballer who plays as a right-back for Ukrainian club Kramatorsk.

== Honours ==
=== Individual ===
- Meistriliiga Goal of the Month: August 2017
