= Lilleküla JK Retro =

Estonian football club

JK Retro
- Full name: Jalgpalliklubi Retro
- Founded: 2009
- Ground: EJL TNTK
- Manager: Dmitri Skiperski
- 2020: III Liiga North, 1st
Home colours	Away colours

JK Retro is an Estonian football club based in Tallinn. Founded in 2009 as Eesti Koondis, they currently play in the III Liiga, the fifth tier of Estonian football.

== Players ==
=== Current squad ===
As of 25 July 2017.

Note: Flags indicate national team as defined under FIFA eligibility rules; some limited exceptions apply. Players may hold more than one non-FIFA nationality.

No.	Pos.	Nation	Player
9	FW	EST	Rasmus Munskind
29	MF	EST	Eero Pruus
—	DF	EST	Mait Anton
—	MF	EST	Marko Arge
—	MF	EST	Alo Dupikov
—	DF	GER	Lars Christian Hopp
—	FW	EST	Juri Jevdokimov
—	MF	EST	Rait Kasterpalu
—	DF	EST	Arvo Kraam
—	MF	EST	Marko Lepik
—	MF	EST	Magnus Martinson
—	DF	EST	Armand Naris
—	MF	EST	Jevgeni Novikov

No.	Pos.	Nation	Player
—	MF	EST	Indrek Rist
—	FW	EST	Kaspar Rõivassepp
—	MF	EST	Tarmo Rüütli
—	MF	EST	Lauri Senješ
—	FW	EST	Gerol Silkin
—	MF	EST	Mikk Sillaste
—	MF		Ilja Simagin
—	FW	RUS	Dmitry Skiperskiy
—	GK	EST	Allan Soomets
—	DF	EST	Andrei Stepanov
—	MF	EST	Martin Taska
—	GK	EST	Toomas Tohver
—	MF	USA	Sean Tremaine Whalen

== Statistics ==
=== League and Cup ===
Season	Division	Pos	Teams	Pld	W	D	L	GF	GA	GD	Pts	Top Goalscorer	Estonian Cup	Notes
2009	IV liiga W	1	12	22	20	2	0	109	24	+85	62	Jan Õun (22)	–	as Eesti Koondis
2010	III liiga E	4	12	22	12	3	7	78	53	+25	39	Jan Õun (23)	First round	as Eesti Koondis
2011	III liiga W	6	11	20	11	1	10	84	62	+22	34	Dmitry Skiperskiy (36)	–	as Eesti Koondis
2012	III liiga W	1	12	22	21	0	1	99	21	+78	63	Dmitry Skiperskiy (36)	First round	as Eesti Koondis
2013	III liiga W	1	12	22	16	2	4	90	36	+54	50	Dmitry Skiperskiy (47)	First round	as JK Retro
2014	III liiga N	3	12	22	14	4	4	106	47	+59	46	Dmitry Skiperskiy (68)	Fourth round	as JK Retro
2015	III liiga N	1	12	22	16	1	5	74	45	+29	49	Dmitry Skiperskiy (64)	Fourth round	as JK Retro
2016	III liiga N	3	12	22	13	4	5	66	44	+22	43	Dmitry Skiperskiy (30)	–	as JK Retro
2017	III liiga N	4	12	22	13	1	8	54	52	+2	40	Dmitry Skiperskiy (24)	–	as JK Retro
2018	III liiga N	1	12	22	17	1	4	80	34	+46	52	Dmitry Skiperskiy (45)	–	as JK Retro
2019	III liiga N	2	12	22	15	0	7	70	29	+41	45	Dmitry Skiperskiy (38)	–	as Lilleküla JK Retro
2020	III liiga N	1	12	22	19	0	3	100	40	+60	57	Dmitry Skiperskiy (37)	–	as Lilleküla JK Retro
