= JK Piraaja Tallinn =

Estonian football club

JK Piraaja
- Full name: JK Piraaja Tallinn
- Founded: 1998
- Ground: Sportland Arena, Tallinn
- Capacity: 700
- Chairman: Ilmar Põhjala
- Manager: Ilmar Põhjala
- League: II liiga S/W
- 2022: II liiga S/W, 14th
Home colours	Away colours

JK Piraaja is Estonian football club based in Tallinn which was founded in 1998. It is one of the oldest football clubs in Estonia. Currently they are playing in the II liiga East/North, fourth-highest division in the Estonian football and Sportland Arena is their home stadion.

== Statistics ==
=== League and Cup ===
Season	Division	Pos	Teams	Pld	W	D	L	GF	GA	GD	Pts	Top goalscorer	Estonian Cup
1998	IV liiga N	5	5	8	0	0	8	9	45	−36	0	(Estonia) Rain Saal (3)	
1999	IV liiga N	5	6	20	5	3	12	25	85	−60	18	Three players (5)	
2000	V liiga N	3	6	15	9	3	3	41	15	+26	30	(Estonia) Rain Bõmberg (15)	
2001	IV liiga N	3	11	20	13	0	7	63	32	+31	39	(Estonia) Rain Bõmberg (27)	
2002	IV liiga N	4	10	18	9	3	6	44	31	+13	30	(Estonia) Ragnar Leimann (19)	
2003	IV liiga N	4	10	18	10	3	5	57	30	+17	33	(Estonia) Ragnar Leimann (24)	
2004	IV liiga N	3	10	18	10	4	4	72	27	+45	34	(Estonia) Ragnar Leimann and (Estonia) Rain Bõmberg (22)	
2005	III liiga N	7	12	22	7	4	11	39	48	−9	25	(Estonia) Ragnar Leimann (12)	
2006	III liiga N	3	12	22	14	0	8	67	47	+20	42	(Estonia) Rain Bõmberg (21)	
2007	II liiga E/N	14	14	26	3	3	20	30	74	−44	12	(Estonia) Rain Bõmberg (9)	
2008	III liiga N	2	12	22	15	3	4	51	20	+31	48	(Estonia) Rain Bõmberg (16)	Third Round
2009	III liiga N	9	12	22	7	4	11	34	50	−16	25	(Estonia) Ragnar Leimann (13)	Fourth Round
2010	III liiga N	2	12	22	14	4	4	49	23	+26	46	(Estonia) Rain Bõmberg (12)	First Round
2011	III liiga N	5	12	22	11	1	10	35	30	+5	34	(Scotland) Graeme Anderson (5)	First Round
2012	III liiga N	9	12	22	6	3	13	32	48	−16	21	(Estonia) Leo Kuuse (11)	First Round
2013	III liiga N	5	12	22	12	1	9	51	38	+13	37	(Estonia) Leo Kuuse (11)	Third Round
2014	III liiga N	1	12	22	16	5	1	65	20	+45	53	(Estonia) Leo Kuuse (16)	First Round
2015	II liiga E/N	8	14	26	10	3	13	42	51	−9	33	(Estonia) Laurits Randmann (7)	Second Round
2016	II liiga E/N	12	14	26	6	6	14	33	61	−28	24	(Estonia) Laurits Randmann (4)	Second Round
2017	II liiga E/N	9	14	26	9	6	11	43	51	−8	33	(Estonia) Tanel Lätti (9)	First Round
2018	II liiga E/N	11	14	26	8	5	13	46	60	−14	29	(Estonia) Mihkel Paapsi (18)	Third Round
