= Pirita JK Reliikvia =

Estonian football club

- Full name: Pirita Jalgpalliklubi Reliikvia
- Founded: 2007; 18 years ago
- Ground: Wismari Stadium, Tallinn
- Capacity: 1,500
- Manager: Priit Simson
- 2017: III Liiga North, 7th
- Website: www.jkreliikvia.ee
Home colours	Away colours

Pirita JK Reliikvia is a football club based in Pirita, Tallinn, Estonia. Founded in 2007, it currently plays in III Liiga.

== Players ==
=== Current squad ===
As of 24 July 2019

Note: Flags indicate national team as defined under FIFA eligibility rules; some limited exceptions apply. Players may hold more than one non-FIFA nationality.

No.	Pos.	Nation	Player
1	GK	(Estonia) EST	Stanislov Tokarev
2	DF	(Estonia) EST	Tarmo Jõgi
4	DF	(Estonia) EST	Marko Hinn
5	GK	(Estonia) EST	Rene Lõiveke
6	MF	(Estonia) EST	Magnus-Valdemar Saar
10	FW	(Estonia) EST	August Sai
11	FW	(Estonia) EST	Rainer Rohtla
15	DF	(Estonia) EST	Rudolf Linnaste
16	MF	(Estonia) EST	Aleksei Filjanin
17	DF	(Estonia) EST	Tarmo Kose
18	MF	(Estonia) EST	Meelis Tasa
20	MF	(Estonia) EST	Risto Lõoke
21	FW	(Estonia) EST	Harry Liimall

No.	Pos.	Nation	Player
22	MF	(Estonia) EST	Rauno Harkmann
23	DF	(Estonia) EST	Kristian Kukk
25	DF	(Estonia) EST	Norman Leemets
26	MF	(Estonia) EST	Magnar Mikkelsaar
27	MF	(Estonia) EST	Vladimir Rüntü
32	MF	(Estonia) EST	Vallo Goroško
33	FW	(Estonia) EST	Jaanus Põllumees
49	DF	(Estonia) EST	Artur Kummer
82	DF	(Estonia) EST	Arko Kuningas
84	MF	(Estonia) EST	Nikolai Titov
90	MF	(Estonia) EST	Romet Rondo
99	GK	(Estonia) EST	Evert Mittal

== Statistics ==
=== League and Cup ===
Season	Division	Pos	Teams	Pld	W	D	L	GF	GA	GD	Pts	Top Goalscorer	Estonian Cup
2008	IV Liiga N	13	14	26	2	5	19	33	90	−57	11	August Sai (14)	–
2009	IV Liiga N	11	13	24	3	3	18	36	104	−68	12	August Sai (15)	–
2010	IV Liiga N	11	12	22	5	2	15	32	83	−51	17	Jaanus Põllumees (10)	First round
2011	IV Liiga N	11	12	22	5	1	16	29	75	−46	16	Harry Liimal (6)	–
2012	IV Liiga N	6	12	22	11	3	8	38	32	+6	36	August Sai (10)	First round
2013	IV Liiga N	8	11	20	4	6	10	41	52	−11	18	August Sai (10)	First round
2014	III Liiga N	1	8	21	17	1	3	67	22	+45	52	Jaanus Põllumees (31)	First round
2015	III Liiga N	6	12	22	10	5	7	49	48	+1	35	Magnar Mikkelsaar (13)	Second round
2016	III Liiga N	1	12	22	7	1	4	65	26	+39	52	Jaanus Põllumees and Marion Adusoo (18)	First round
2017	III Liiga N	7	12	22	10	3	9	44	44	0	33	Risto Lõoke (10)	First round
