= Võru JK =

Estonian football club

- Full name: Võru Jalgpalliklubi
- Founded: 2001
- Dissolved: 2016
- Ground: Võru stadium
- Capacity: 1600
- 2016: II Liiga North-East, 9th
- Website: http://www.jkvoru.ee/
Home colours	Away colours

Võru JK was an Estonian football club based in Võru. The club was founded in 2001 and was dissolved in the end 2016 when the team merged into Võru FC Helios. The team last played in the II Liiga, the third highest level of Estonian football.

== Statistics ==
=== League and Cup ===
Season	Division	Pos	Pld	W	D	L	GF	GA	GD	Pts	Top goalscorer	Cup	Notes
2002	III Liiga S	5	18	9	2	7	51	34	+17	29	Eston Kurvits (14)		as JK Võru
2003	III Liiga S	9	18	3	6	9	30	43	−13	15	Janek Eks (6)		as JK Võru
2004	IV Liiga S	3	18	12	1	5	65	31	+34	37	Janek Eks (14)		as JK Võru
2005	III Liiga S	4	22	13	2	7	54	32	+22	41	Eston Kurvits (16)		as JK Võru
2006	III Liiga S	2	22	13	7	2	84	45	+39	46	Janek Eks (16)		as JK Võru
2007	II Liiga S/W	8	26	9	6	11	50	68	−18	33	Janek Eks and Tauno Kikas (8)		as Võru JK
2008	II Liiga S/W	7	26	11	3	12	60	63	−3	36	Tauno Kikas (24)	First round	as Võru JK
2009	II Liiga S/W	12	26	7	3	16	43	77	−34	24	Jüri Artemkin (12)	Fourth round	as Võru JK
2010	II Liiga S/W	13	26	7	2	17	40	89	−49	23	Jüri Artemkin (12)	Second round	as Võru JK
2011	III Liiga S	3	22	13	4	5	57	22	+35	43	Jüri Artemkin (26)	Third round	as Võru JK
2012	III Liiga S	4	22	12	0	10	64	45	+19	36	Andrei Kiš (11)	Fourth round	as Võru JK
2013	III Liiga S	1	22	17	1	4	83	27	+56	52	Kristo Perli (21)	First round	as Võru JK
2014	II Liiga N/E	7	26	10	7	9	49	46	+3	37	Lauri Pilv (15)	Third round	as Võru JK
2015	II Liiga N/E	7	26	11	3	12	56	57	−1	36	Raul Rebane (12)	-	as Võru JK
2016	II Liiga N/E	9	26	9	7	10	42	48	-6	34	Kait Hinn (5)	-	as Võru JK
