= Panagiotis Vouis =

Greek footballer

Personal information
- Date of birth: 23 October 1985 (age 41)
- Place of birth: Kalymnos, Greece
- Height: 1.89 m (6 ft 2 1/2 in)
- Position: Midfielder

Youth career
- 2002–2004: SpVgg Greuther Fürth

Senior career*
Years	Team	Apps	(Gls)
2004-2005	SpVgg Greuther Fürth II		
2002–2003	Proodeftiki F.C.	15	(5)
2006	FC Amberg		
2007–2009	Fortuna Sittard	1	(0)
2009	Tartu JK Tammeka	12	(4)
2010–2011	Koninklijke HFC		
2011–	Heidelberg United FC		

International career
2001	Greece U17	?	(1)
- * Club domestic league appearances and goals as of 1 December 2009

Panagiotis Vouis (Greek: Παναγιώτης Βούης; born 23 October 1985) is a Greek professional footballer. Although being born in Greece, He holds Australian Citizenship
