= Kuusalu JK Rada =

Estonian football club

- Full name: Kuusalu Jalgpalliklubi Rada
- Founded: 1994
- Ground: Kuusalu Keskkooli Stadium, Kuusalu
- Manager: Kristo Valdna
- 2017: III Liiga East, 9th
- Website: https://www.facebook.com/Kuusalu-JK-Rada-120462510316/
Home colours	Away colours

Kuusalu JK Rada was a football club in Kuusalu, Estonia.

It was formed in 1994 and it currently plays in II Liiga North/East. It dissolved after the 2017 season.

== Players ==
=== Current squad ===
As of 25 July 2016.

Note: Flags indicate national team as defined under FIFA eligibility rules; some limited exceptions apply. Players may hold more than one non-FIFA nationality.

No.	Pos.	Nation	Player
1	GK	(Estonia) EST	Rainer Blond
2	DF	(Estonia) EST	Margus Christopher Kalda (on loan from Rakvere JK Tarvas)
3	MF	(Estonia) EST	Denis Petrov
6	DF	(Estonia) EST	Kenneth Kröönström
8	MF	(Estonia) EST	Keijo Õunapu
9	FW	(Estonia) EST	Aleksandr Levin
10	MF	(Estonia) EST	Andrei Kašuba
11	MF	(Estonia) EST	Kristo Valdna
12	MF	(Estonia) EST	Kris Oliver Maiberg
14	DF	(Estonia) EST	Siim Tamm
17	FW	(Estonia) EST	Aleksander Täht

No.	Pos.	Nation	Player
18	MF	(Estonia) EST	Joonas Kröönström
19	DF	(Estonia) EST	Rando Kapralov
20	DF	(Estonia) EST	Mihkel Allemann
25	MF	(Estonia) EST	Siim Aksel Amer
27	MF	(Estonia) EST	Markus Sisas
30	MF	(Estonia) EST	Kristo Remmelgas
40	MF	(Estonia) EST	Kristjan Kaskla
41	DF	(Estonia) EST	Aleksandr Morozov
67	FW	(Estonia) EST	Keio Kivistik
92	DF	(Estonia) EST	Kevin Kröönström

== Statistics ==
=== League and Cup ===
Season	Division	Pos	Teams	Pld	W	D	L	GF	GA	GD	Pts	Top Goalscorer	Estonian Cup
1998	III Liiga E	4	6	10	4	1	5	21	21	0	13	Andres Mürk (5)	
1999	III Liiga E	3	6	20	7	6	7	20	22	−2	27	Igor Toplin and Rael Treiberk (4)	
2000	III Liiga E	4	5	16	6	0	10	23	28	−5	18	Kristjan Toomingas (5)	
2001	III Liiga E	4	10	18	8	6	4	48	30	+18	30	Raul Treiberk (15)	
2002	III Liiga E	1	10	18	13	2	3	47	15	+32	41	Raul Treiberk (9)	
2003	II Liiga N/E	4	8	28	9	5	14	40	50	−10	32	Meelis Nõmme (8)	
2004	II Liiga N/E	5	8	28	12	5	11	50	55	−5	41	Maksim Konalov (14)	
2005	II Liiga N/E	7	8	28	8	4	16	35	61	−26	28	Meelis Nõmme (7)	
2006	III Liiga E	3	12	22	13	4	5	65	24	+41	43	Meelis Nõmme (10)	
2007	II Liiga N/E	12	14	26	5	5	16	28	60	−32	20	Risto Roos (8)	
2008	III Liiga E	6	11	20	7	3	10	30	44	−14	24	Risto Roos and Tauno Pajula (6)	Second round
2009	III Liiga E	11	12	22	5	2	15	33	84	−51	17	Tauno Pajula (9)	Second round
2010	III Liiga E	5	12	22	11	4	7	66	45	+21	37	Roman Potjonkin (22)	Second round
2011	III Liiga E	2	12	22	13	3	6	66	36	+30	42	Maksim Konovalov (19)	Second round
2012	III Liiga E	11	12	22	5	4	13	38	40	−2	19	Siim Tamm and Joonas Kröönstöm (8)	Third round
2013	III Liiga E	5	12	22	10	5	7	47	33	+14	35	Aleksandr Levin (10)	First round
2014	III Liiga E	1	12	22	18	2	2	74	14	+60	56	Aleksandr Levin (26)	Second round
2015	II Liiga N/E	11	14	26	7	5	14	45	65	−20	26	Aleksandr Levin and Keio Kivistik (12)	Second round
2016	II Liiga N/E	13	14	26	6	3	17	32	85	−53	21	Kris Oliver Maiberg (10)	First round
2017	III Liiga E	9	12	22	7	2	13	38	61	−23	23	Taavi Küngas (17)	Third round
