= Dmytro Boyko =

Ukrainian professional footballer

Personal information
- Full name: Dmytro V'acheslavovych Boyko
- Date of birth: 30 September 1981 (age 45)
- Place of birth: Ukrainian SSR, Soviet Union
- Height: 1.81 m (5 ft 11 in)
- Position: Central midfielder

Youth career
- 1999: Yunist Chernihiv

Senior career*
Years	Team	Apps	(Gls)
2000–2006	Stal Alchevsk	49	(3)
2006–2007	Helios Kharkiv	19	(0)
2008–2009	Sillamäe Kalev	24	(3)
- * Club domestic league appearances and goals as of 30 November 2009

Dmytro V'acheslavovych Boyko (Ukrainian: Дмитро В'ячеславович Бойко; born 30 September 1981) is a Ukrainian professional footballer. He plays the position of midfielder and is 1.76 m tall and weighs 72 kg. His former clubs include FC Stal Alchevsk, FC Helios Kharkiv and JK Sillamäe Kalev.
