= Eino Puri =

Estonian footballer

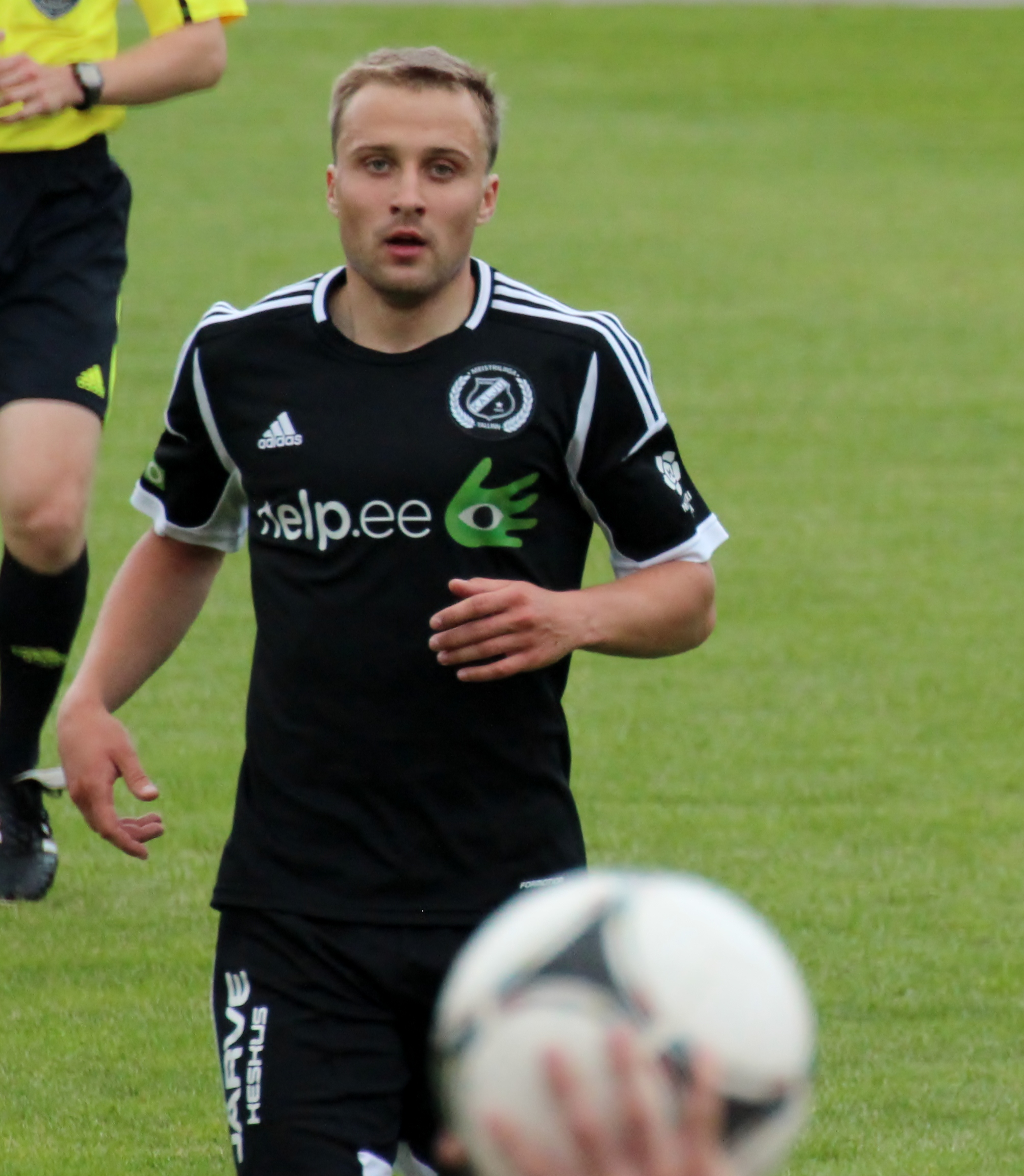

Personal information
- Full name: Eino Puri
- Date of birth: 7 May 1988 (age 38)
- Place of birth: Tartu, then part of Estonian SSR, Soviet Union
- Height: 1.74 m (5 ft 9 in)
- Position: Midfielder

Senior career*
Years	Team	Apps	(Gls)
2004	Tartu SK 10	18	(11)
2005–2010	FCI Levadia Tallinn	69	(5)
2007	→ Viljandi JK Tulevik (loan)	12	(1)
2011–2013	Nõmme Kalju	94	(13)
2014	Botoșani	3	(0)
2014–2016	Nõmme Kalju	69	(2)
2017	Tammeka	20	(1)
2017–2018	Nybergsund-Trysil	34	(1)
2019–2020	Trysil FK	6	(2)

International career
2006	Estonia U19	3	(0)
2006–2010	Estonia U21	14	(0)
2011–2012	Estonia U23	2	(0)
2009–2014	Estonia	5	(0)
- * Club domestic league appearances and goals as of 13:46, 25 January 2026 (UTC)

Eino Puri (born 7 May 1988) is an Estonian former professional footballer.

== Club career ==
Puri began his professional career with Tartu SK 10 before signing for FCI Levadia Tallinn in 2005. From 2011 to 2016 he played for Nõmme Kalju.

== International career ==
Puri was capped by Estonia at under-19, under-21 and under-23 level. He made his debut for the senior national team on 29 May 2009 in a friendly match against Wales, coming on as a late substitute and earned a total of 5 caps for the national side.

== Personal life ==
Puri is one of three triplets: his brother, Sander Puri, is also a footballer and his sister, Kadri Puri, is a volleyball player.

== Honours ==
- FCI Levadia Tallinn
  - Estonian Top Division: 2006, 2007, 2008, 2009
    - Runners Up: 2005
  - Estonian Cup: 2005, 2007
  - Estonian Supercup
    - Runners Up: 2005, 2007, 2008
- Nõmme Kalju FC
  - Estonian Top Division: 2012
  - Estonian Cup: 2015
