= Saue JK =

Estonian football club

- Full name: Saue Jalgpalliklubi
- Founded: 1998
- Ground: Laagri kunstmuruväljak
- Manager: Argo Alaväli
- League: III Liiga
- 2017: II Liiga S/W, 6th
Home colours	Away colours

Saue Jalgpalliklubi is an Estonian football club based in Saue. Founded in 1998, they currently play in the III liiga, the fourth tier of Estonian football.

== Players ==
=== Current squad ===
As of 16 June 2017.

Note: Flags indicate national team as defined under FIFA eligibility rules; some limited exceptions apply. Players may hold more than one non-FIFA nationality.

No.	Pos.	Nation	Player
—		(Estonia) EST	Argo Alaväli
—		(Estonia) EST	Sander Avingo
—		(Estonia) EST	Henri Heinsalu
—		(Estonia) EST	Mart Jõesaar
—		(Estonia) EST	Algis Kelder
—		(Estonia) EST	Hans Kaarel Kivine
—		(Estonia) EST	Kaspar Kotter
—		(Estonia) EST	Vincent Ray Lambin
—		(Estonia) EST	Markus Lehtsalu
—		(Estonia) EST	Mauri Levandi
—		(Estonia) EST	Erkki Liiv
—		(Estonia) EST	Karl Lindegron
—		(Estonia) EST	Silver Milpak

No.	Pos.	Nation	Player
—		(Estonia) EST	Kert Paidre
—		(Estonia) EST	Janar Pajo
—		(Estonia) EST	Kristjan Ploompuu
—		(Estonia) EST	Martin Saar
—		(Estonia) EST	Oliver Strastin
—		(Estonia) EST	Rasmus Strastin
—		(Estonia) EST	Kristjan Suurjärv
—		(Estonia) EST	Holger Suvi
—		(Estonia) EST	Talis Tamm
—		(Estonia) EST	Roland Tammela
—		(Estonia) EST	Urmo Timusk
—		(Estonia) EST	Harles Veersalu

== Statistics ==
=== League and Cup ===
Season	Division	Pos	Teams	Pld	W	D	L	GF	GA	GD	Pts	Top Goalscorer	Estonian Cup	Notes
1999	IV liiga N	4	6	20	7	5	8	63	40	+23	26	Marek Ivanson (17)		as Saue JK
2000	IV liiga N	2	6	20	9	5	6	41	30	+11	32	Handro Kõrgesaar (13)		as Saue JK
2001	III Liiga N	7	10	18	6	3	9	27	55	−28	21	Handro Kõrgesaar (9)		as Saue JK
2002	III Liiga N	9	10	18	2	2	14	19	122	−103	8	Handro Kõrgesaar (5)		as Saue JK
2003	IV liiga N	5	10	18	9	3	6	37	22	+15	30	Carl Sõlg (8)		as Saue JK
2004	IV liiga N	2	10	18	11	5	2	35	12	+23	38	Carl Sõlg (11)		as Saue JK
2005	III liiga N	10	12	22	6	3	13	40	62	−22	21	Silver Rätsep (10)		as Saue JK
2006	IV liiga N	1	12	22	19	2	1	92	19	+73	59	Janar Pajo (23)		as Saue JK
2007	III liiga N	3	12	22	15	2	5	70	33	+37	47	Janar Pajo (23)		as Saue JK
2008	III liiga N	8	12	22	9	1	12	45	55	−10	28	Janar Pajo (11)		as Saue JK
2009	III liiga N	6	12	22	10	3	9	56	58	−2	33	Janar Pajo (20)	First round	as Saue JK
2010	III liiga N	6	12	22	12	3	7	68	42	+26	39	Janar Pajo (19)	Third round	as Saue JK Laagri
2011	III liiga N	2	12	22	15	4	3	69	28	+41	49	Janar Pajo (26)	First round	as Saue JK Laagri
2012	III liiga N	2	12	22	16	2	4	76	28	+48	50	Janar Pajo (28)	Second round	as Saue JK Laagri
2013	II liiga N/E	5	14	24	13	3	8	50	35	+15	42	Kristjan Suurjärv and Janar Pajo (19)	Fourth round	as Saue JK Laagri
2014	II liiga S/W	3	14	26	11	6	9	52	42	+10	39	Kristjan Suurjärv (19)	Fourth round	as Saue JK Laagri
2015	II liiga S/W	9	14	26	10	4	12	51	57	−6	34	Kristjan Suurjärv (20)	First round	as Saue JK Laagri
2016	II liiga S/W	5	14	26	16	4	6	85	47	+38	52	Kristjan Suurjärv (34)	Third round	as Saue JK Laagri
2017	II liiga S/W	6	14	26	12	4	10	65	54	+11	40	Kristjan Suurjärv (26)	Second round	as Saue JK Laagri
2018	III liiga W	3	12	22	14	3	5	84	35	+49	45	Kristjan Suurjärv (28)	-	as Saue JK
