= FC Otepää =

Estonian football club

- Full name: Football Club Otepää
- Founded: 2004; 22 years ago
- Ground: Tehvandi Stadium
- Manager: Martin Teder
- League: II Liiga W/S
- 2016: III liiga, 1st
- Website: www.fcotepaa.ee
Home colours	Away colours

FC Otepää is a football club, based in Otepää, Estonia.

Since January 2019, the club acts as a youth team for Tartu JK Tammeka.

== Players ==
=== Current squad ===
As of 14 June 2017.

Note: Flags indicate national team as defined under FIFA eligibility rules; some limited exceptions apply. Players may hold more than one non-FIFA nationality.

No.	Pos.	Nation	Player
1	GK	EST	Kaur Lõhmus
5	FW	EST	Raul Lehismets
6	FW	EST	Siim Lehismets
7	DF	EST	Martin Raid
8	DF	EST	Veiko Soo
10	FW	EST	Maksim Mitrofanov
11	FW	EST	Norbert Hurt
12	FW	EST	Mihkel Teder
13	DF	EST	Kennart Saaremäe
14	DF	EST	Simmo Suiste
16	DF	EST	Sten Teemant
17	FW	EST	Tanel Ojaste
20	FW	EST	Raul Oja
21	FW	EST	Priit Lehismets
22	FW	EST	Rene Levin

No.	Pos.	Nation	Player
25	GK	EST	Kaldin Raidväli
28	DF	EST	Janar Tamm
29	DF	EST	Taavi Lassmann
35	DF	EST	Kait-Kaarel Vaino
39	DF	EST	Marek Tamm
42	FW	EST	Ardi Mark
71	FW	EST	Mats Plado
82	DF	EST	Rainar Laes
85	DF	EST	Martin Teder
88	DF	EST	Siimar Taits
89	FW	EST	Risko Eit
95	GK	EST	Indrek Koser
99	DF	EST	Karl Laasik
—	FW	EST	Kert Hüdsi

== Statistics ==
=== League and Cup ===
Season	Division	Pos	Pld	W	D	L	GF	GA	GD	Pts	Top goalscorer	Cup	Notes
2004	V Liiga S	7	14	2	1	11	17	57	-40	7	Tanel Ojaste (10)	-	as FC Kääriku
2005	IV Liiga S	8	22	7	3	12	46	47	-1	24	Tanel Ojaste (23)	-	as FC Kääriku
2006	IV Liiga S	5	22	12	4	6	45	36	+9	40	Sergei Petuhhov (12)	First round	as FC Otepää
2007	IV Liiga S	4	18	9	4	5	58	18	+40	31	Martin Teder (10)	Second round	as FC Otepää
2008	IV Liiga S	2	22	19	1	2	85	23	+62	58	Raul Oja (20)	Second round	as FC Otepää
2009	III Liiga S	3	22	12	2	8	62	41	+21	38	Norbert Hurt (12)	Third round	as FC Otepää
2010	III Liiga S	5	22	10	3	9	58	50	+8	33	Norbert Hurt (10)	Third round	as FC Otepää
2011	III Liiga S	6	22	10	4	8	48	45	+3	34	Ott Meerits and Raul Lehismets (8)	Third round	as FC Otepää
2012	III Liiga S	8	22	7	4	11	39	53	-14	25	Tanel Ojaste (11)	Second round	as FC Otepää
2013	III Liiga S	3	22	13	4	5	60	31	+29	43	Martin Teder (9)	Third round	as FC Otepää
2014	III Liiga S	6	22	9	3	10	49	56	-7	30	Risko Eit (11)	Second round	as FC Otepää
2015	III Liiga S	3	22	13	5	4	58	33	+25	44	Priit Lehismets (21)	Second round	as FC Otepää
2016	III Liiga S	1	22	16	2	4	84	45	+39	50	Raul Lehismets (29)	First round	as FC Otepää
2017	II Liiga W/S	9	26	10	2	14	63	69	-6	32	Raul Lehismets (25)	Second round	as FC Otepää
2018	II Liiga W/S	11	26	8	3	15	46	63	-17	27	Raul Lehismets (10)	Second round	as FC Otepää
