= Tallinna FC Olympic Olybet =

Estonian football club

- Founded: 2000
- Ground: Kalevi Staadioni Kunstmuru, Tallinn
- Manager: (Estonia) Alar Petrovits
- League: IV Liiga North/East
- 2017: IV Liiga North/East, 2nd
- Website: http://www.fcolympic.ee/
Home colours	Away colours

Previous logo

Tallinna FC Olympic Olybet is an Estonian football club, playing in the town of Tallinn.

== Current squad ==
As of 29 October 2017.

Note: Flags indicate national team as defined under FIFA eligibility rules; some limited exceptions apply. Players may hold more than one non-FIFA nationality.

No.	Pos.	Nation	Player
1	GK	(Estonia) EST	Priit Jalasto
3	MF	(Estonia) EST	Marco Božko
4	DF	(Estonia) EST	Janno Lamsoo
5	MF	(Estonia) EST	Veiko Rohtla
6	DF	(Estonia) EST	Marvin Lemba
7	DF	(Estonia) EST	William Vaask
9	MF	(Estonia) EST	Andri Porila
10	FW	(Estonia) EST	Alar Petrovits
11	MF	(Estonia) EST	Matis Miisna
12	MF	(Estonia) EST	Taavi Kütimaa
13	MF	(Estonia) EST	Indrek Juhanson
14	MF	(Estonia) EST	Hardi Veske
16	MF	(Estonia) EST	Kaspar Pahla
17	MF	(Estonia) EST	Kristjan Lahe

No.	Pos.	Nation	Player
18	DF	(Estonia) EST	Märt Tammisaar
19	MF	(Estonia) EST	Mikk Räni
21	MF	(Estonia) EST	Martin Aru
22	DF	(Estonia) EST	Artur Kaljurand
23	GK	(Estonia) EST	Tauri Vilipõld
27	DF	(Estonia) EST	Renar Tupits
28	DF	(Estonia) EST	Oliver Voorel
29	MF	(Estonia) EST	Janek Popell
30	MF	(Estonia) EST	Tõnis Pärna
33	MF	(Estonia) EST	Werner Grün
34	DF	(Estonia) EST	Taavi Rehema
—	FW	(Estonia) EST	Kristo Remmelgas
—	DF	(Estonia) EST	Roland Samberk

== Statistics ==
=== League and Cup ===
Season	Division	Pos	Teams	Pld	W	D	L	GF	GA	GD	Pts	Top Goalscorer	Estonian Cup	Notes
2000	V Liiga N	1	6	15	11	3	1	52	4	+48	36	Mikk Pang (12)		as Tallinna FC Olympic
2001	IV Liiga N	5	11	20	12	2	6	101	38	+63	38	Margus Grauberg and Markko Kudu (15)		as Tallinna FC Olympic
2002	IV Liiga N	5	10	18	9	2	7	49	31	+18	29	Markko Kudu (22)		as Tallinna FC Olympic
2003	IV Liiga N	2	10	18	13	2	3	58	23	+35	41	Markko Kudu (38)		as Tallinna FC Olympic
2004	III Liiga N	7	10	18	5	4	9	41	51	-10	19	Markko Kudu (21)		as Tallinna FC Olympic
2005	III Liiga N	9	12	22	6	3	13	44	78	-34	21	Magnar Mikkelsaar (12)		as Tallinna FC Olympic
2006	III Liiga N	8	12	22	9	0	13	40	91	-51	27	Margus Grauberg and Rando Tamm (6)		as Tallinna FC Olympic
2007	III Liiga N	5	12	22	11	2	9	51	44	+7	35	Magnar Mikkelsaar (15)		as Tallinna FC Olympic
2008	III Liiga N	4	12	22	10	3	9	43	53	−10	33	Rando Tamm (13)		as Tallinna FC Olympic
2009	III Liiga N	11	12	22	6	0	16	42	71	-29	18	Kristjan Lainjärv (9)	Third round	as Tallinna FC Olympic
2010	III Liiga N	1	12	22	16	4	2	85	37	+48	52	Rando Tamm (20)	Second round	as Tallinna FC Olympic
2011	II Liiga N/E	12	14	26	3	4	19	32	108	-76	13	Rando Tamm (12)	Second round	as Tallinna FC Olympic
2012	III Liiga N	12	12	22	3	3	16	27	73	-46	12	Rando Tamm (8)	Second round	as Tallinna FC Olympic
2013	III Liiga N	8	12	22	7	4	11	42	52	-10	25	Andree Porila (10)	First round	as Tallinna FC Olympic
2014	III Liiga N	9	12	22	6	4	12	56	64	-8	22	Alar Petrovits (14)	First round	as Tallinna FC Olympic OLybet
2015	III Liiga N	11	12	22	3	1	18	38	81	−43	10	Margus Grauberg (11)	Second round	as Tallinna FC Olympic OLybet
2016	III Liiga N	12	12	22	3	4	15	23	53	-30	13	Indrek Juhanson (5)	First round	as Tallinna FC Olympic OLybet
2017	IV Liiga N/E	2	9	16	10	3	3	53	29	+24	33	Alar Petrovits (22)	First round	as Tallinna FC Olympic OLybet
2018	IV liiga N/W	3	8	21	12	3	5	60	43	+17	41	Alar Petrovits (32)	First round	as Tallinna FC Olympic OLybet
