= Tabasalu JK =

Former Estonian football club

- Full name: Tabasalu Jalgpalliklubi
- Founded: 1999
- Dissolved: 2013
- Chairman: Kent Männik
- Manager: Erko Saviauk
- League: III Liiga
- 2011: II Liiga Ida/Põhi, 14th
- Website: http://web.zone.ee/tabasalupk/
Home colours	Away colours

Tabasalu Jalgpalliklubi was an Estonian football club based in Tabasalu. The club was founded in 1999. The team last played in the II Liiga, the third highest level of Estonian football. The team was dissolved in 2013, and a new team, JK Tabasalu, was created.
