= Põlva FC Lootos =

Estonian football club

- Full name: Põlva Football Club Lootos
- Founded: 27 October 1994; 31 years ago
- Ground: Lootospark, Põlva
- Capacity: 600
- President: Annika Aust
- Manager: Avo Jakovits
- League: III Liiga South
- 2020: III Liiga South, 10th
- Website: http://www.fclootos.ee/
Home colours	Away colours

Põlva FC Lootos is an Estonian football club based in Põlva. The club was founded in 1994. Lootospark is their home stadium.

== History ==
The club was founded in 1994. Lootos played their first season in the second division of the Estonian championship. The club was mostly packed with former Põlva SK Serviti players. The traditional colours of Lootos are black and yellow. Club colours are inspired by the kit of German football club BVB. The women's team is more successful in Estonia and have played in the highest level of country Meistriliiga, while the men's team resides in the fifth Division

== Stadium ==
Lootos' home stadium is a recently built 4G artificial ground Lootospark which holds a capacity of 600 and has an under-soil heating system.

== Sponsors ==
Period	Kit manufacturer	Shirt sponsor
1994–1995	Marat	None
1995–1996	Erima	None
1997–1998	Adidas	Eesti Gaas
1998–2003	Umbro	KWH Pipe
2004–2007	Umbro	Enerel
2008–2009	Umbro	Komatsu
2010–2014	Nike	Värska Originaal
2015–2022	Nike	Lootos
2023–	Nike	COOP

== Men's team ==
=== Current squad ===
As of 10 April 2024

Note: Flags indicate national team as defined under FIFA eligibility rules; some limited exceptions apply. Players may hold more than one non-FIFA nationality.

No.	Pos.	Nation	Player
1	GK	EST	Markus Villako
3	DF	EST	Valeri Dobrovolski
4	MF	EST	Karl-Kristofer Hirmo
7	FW	EST	Priit Rahuelu
8	MF	EST	Andre Kukk
10	FW	EST	Temari Nuuma
11	MF	EST	Kristjan Pundonen
12	DF	EST	Maik Kolats
13	MF	EST	Tambet Toim
14	DF	EST	Kert Preeden
17	FW	EST	Martin Vahtra
20	MF	EST	Risto Saarniit

No.	Pos.	Nation	Player
39	GK	EST	Henri Loeg
69	GK	EST	Roomet Kõiv
21	MF	EST	Elon Holger Vaab
23	FW	EST	Markus Lina
26	DF	EST	Jürgen Juks
29	DF	EST	Rasmus Mathias Mõttus
31	DF	EST	Helander Vist
55	MF	IND	Sharib Khan
77	MF	EST	Tauri Kolk
91	MF	EST	Markus Mäeots
92	MF	EST	Oliver Berg

=== Player of the Year ===
- 2022 (Estonia) Temari Nuuma
- 2021 (Estonia) Tauri Kolk
- 2020 (Estonia) Markus Villako
- 2019 (Estonia) Jürgen Juks
- 2018 (Estonia) Jürgen Juks
- 2017 (Estonia) Jürgen Juks
- 2016 (Estonia) Priit Rahuelu
- 2015 (Estonia) Priit Rahuelu
- 2014 (Estonia) Raigo Orti
- 2013 (Estonia) Tauri Kolk
- 2012 (Estonia) Erik Listmann
- 2011 (Estonia) Egon Kasuk
- 2010 (Estonia) Alar Alve
- 2009 (Estonia) Alar Alve
- 2008 (Estonia) Alar Alve

== League results since 1994 ==
Season	League	Position	Points	Goals	Notes
1994–95	II league	4	6	16:36	
1994–95	II league	DNF	7	9:21	relegation
1995–96	III league South	5	0	11:57	relegation
1995–96	III-IV league play-off	2	12	24:22	promotion
1996–97	III league South	5	3	12:33	relegation
1996–97	III-IV league play-off	1	9	11:2	promotion
1997–98	III league South	6.	6	8:44	relegation
1996–97	III-IV league play-off	5	13	22:29	
1998	IV league	6	3	11:47	
1999	IV league	2	37	54:40	promotion
2000	III league South	6	4	18:108	
2001	III league South	9	16	26:60	relegation
2002	IV league	7	25	38:44	
2003	IV league	7	19	33:56	
2004	IV league	8.	14	31:61	
2005	IV league	4.	37	48:35	
2006	IV league	2.	45	69:25	promotion
2007	III league South	5.	38	65:40	
2008	III league South	3.	39	79:39	
2009	III league South	6.	31	55:54	
2010	III league South	3.	47	51:24	
2011	III league South	5.	41	70:15	
2012	III league South	6.	33	50:52	
2013	III league South	8.	30	52:41	
2014	III league South	4.	42	49:34	
2015	III league South	4.	36	42:33	
2016	III league South	10.	16	16:68	relegation
2017	IV league South	5.	21	51:41	promotion
2018	III league South	11.	18	39:72	relegation
2019	IV league South	5.	19	38:60	
2020	III league South	10.	14	32:111	relegation
2021	III league South	11.	17	45:77	relegation
2022	III league South	9.	18	53:64	
2023	III league South	5.	33	61:77	

Legend
Color indication
II league tier
III league tier
IV league tier

== Management ==
=== Current backroom staff ===
==== First Team ====
Position	Staff
Head Coach	(Estonia) Avo Jakovits
Assistant Coach	(Estonia) Temari Nuuma
Fitness Coach	(Estonia) Denis Pavlov
Captain	(Estonia) Jürgen Juks

Last updated: 1 October 2022

=== Team managers history ===
Position	Staff
1994-1997	(Estonia) Bruno Rammo
1997-1999	(Estonia) Indrek Käo
2000	(Estonia) Kaido-Meinhard Kukli
2001-2002	(Estonia) Gerd Vahtra
2002-2004	(Estonia) Ivan Mihnovitch
2005-2011	(Estonia) Avo Jakovits
2011-2016	(Estonia) Kaido-Meinhard Kukli
2016	(Estonia) Margus Nemvalts
2016	(Estonia) Indrek Käo
2017-2018	(Estonia) Kaido-Meinhard Kukli
2019-2020	(Estonia) Rauno Puusepp
2021 -	(Estonia) Avo Jakovits

Last updated: 20 December 2020

==== Non-playing staff ====
Position	Staff
Club President	(Estonia) Annika Aust
Member of Board, Vice president	(Estonia) Jürgen Juks
Member of Board, Head of Youth Coaching	(Estonia) Avo Jakovits
Member of Board	(Estonia) Ivan Mihnovitš
Member of Board	(Estonia) Jagne Roodes
CEO	(Estonia) Indrek Käo
Head of Women's 1st Team, Under 14s Coach	(Estonia) Kaido-Meinhard Kukli
Under-18,16 and 13s Coach	(Estonia) Avo Jakovits
Under-12-11s, Coach	(Estonia) Temari Nuuma
Girls Under-16s, 6-7s Coach	(Estonia) Ave-Lii Laas
Girls Under-12s, 5-6s Coach	(Estonia) Kristin Kukli

Last updated: 30 March 2024
Source: Board of Club
