= Alo Dupikov =

Estonian footballer

Personal information
- Full name: Alo Dupikov
- Date of birth: 5 November 1985 (age 40)
- Place of birth: Kehtna, then part of Estonian SSR, Soviet Union
- Height: 1.88 m (6 ft 2 in)
- Position: Forward

Team information
- Current team: JK Retro

Youth career
- –2001: FC Flora Kehtna

Senior career*
Years	Team	Apps	(Gls)
2001	FC Lelle	19	(1)
2002–2003	JK Tervis Pärnu	34	(0)
2004	FC Valga	25	(2)
2005–2011	FC Flora Tallinn	82	(23)
2005	→ JK Tervis Pärnu	17	(9)
2006–2011	→ FC Flora II Tallinn	58	(27)
2006	→ Viljandi JK Tulevik	17	(0)
2008	→ JK Sillamäe Kalev	15	(5)
2012	Egersund IK		
2013–2014	Nõmme Kalju	22	(1)
2013–2014	Nõmme Kalju II	3	(6)
2016–	JK Retro	13	(10)

International career^{‡}
1999	Estonia U15	4	(0)
2001	Estonia U17	7	(0)
2003	Estonia U19	5	(0)
2005	Estonia U20	2	(0)
2004–2007	Estonia U21	8	(1)
2009–2010	Estonia	5	(0)
- * Club domestic league appearances and goals as of 4 December 2017 ‡ National team caps and goals as of 17 February 2013

Alo Dupikov (born 5 November 1985 in Kehtna) is a former Estonian professional footballer, who played as a striker. During his career he earned five caps for Estonia national team in friendlies.

== Club career ==
On 1 July 2010 in Europa League qualification match against Dinamo Tbilisi Dupikov scored his first European competition goal.

Dupikov joined JK Nõmme Kalju's pre-season training in December 2012 and officially became part of the club on 21 January 2013, when he signed a two-year contract with the Estonian champions.

== International career ==
Dupikov made his international debut on 29 May 2009 in a friendly match against Wales.
