= Sillamäe Kalevi Stadium =

Multi-purpose stadium in Sillamäe, Estonia

Coordinates: 59°23′41.88″N 27°46′21.34″E

Sillamäe Kalevi staadion
- Interactive map of Sillamäe Kalevi staadion
- Location: Sillamäe, Estonia
- Owner: Town of Sillamäe
- Capacity: 800
- Surface: Grass

Tenant
- Sillamäe Kalev (Meistriliiga)

Sillamäe Kalevi staadion is a multi-purpose stadium in Sillamäe, Estonia. It is currently used mostly for football matches and hosts the matches of JK Sillamäe Kalev. The stadium holds 800 people.
