= JK Sillamäe Kalev U21 =

Estonian football club

Sillamäe Kalev U21
- Full name: JK Sillamäe Kalev U21
- Founded: 2011
- Ground: Sillamäe Kalev Stadium, Sillamäe
- Capacity: 800
- Chairman: Aleksandr Starodubtsev
- Manager: Algimantas Briaunys
- League: Esiliiga B
- 2016: Esiliiga B, 6th
- Website: http://www.fcsillamae.ee
Home colours	Away colours

JK Sillamäe Kalev U21 was a football club based in Sillamäe, Estonia. It was Sillamäe Kalev's reserve team. They played their home games at Sillamäe Kalev Stadium. Reserve teams in Estonia played in the same league system as their senior teams rather than a separate league. Reserve teams, however, cannot play in the same division as their senior team. Players can switch between senior and reserve teams.

As of 2018, however, the team became bankrupt and does not play games anymore.

== History ==
Season	League	Pos	Pld	W	D	L	GF	GA	GD	Pts	Top Goalscorer	Cup
2011	II Liiga	3	26	18	2	6	102	37	+65	56	(Ukraine) Irfan Ametov (21)	
2012	II Liiga	2	26	15	8	3	82	26	+56	53	(Estonia) Aleksandr Volkov (17)	
2013	Esiliiga B	3	36	19	9	8	81	53	+28	66	(Russia) Irakli Torinava (20)	
2014	Esiliiga B	4	36	17	3	16	74	64	+10	54	(Estonia) Aleksandr Volkov (30)	
2015	Esiliiga B	3	36	19	6	11	73	57	+16	63	(Estonia) Aleksandr Volkov (12)	
2016	Esiliiga B	6	36	16	5	15	70	61	+9	53	(Estonia) Roman Grigorevski (15)	
2017	Esiliiga B	10	36	8	3	25	38	85	-47	27	(Estonia) Roman Grigorevski (10)	

== Players ==
=== Current squad ===
As of 15 June 2017.

Note: Flags indicate national team as defined under FIFA eligibility rules; some limited exceptions apply. Players may hold more than one non-FIFA nationality.

No.	Pos.	Nation	Player
3	DF	EST	Aleksei Andrejev
7	FW	EST	Erik Anohhin
—	MF	EST	Artjom Bazhkov
—	FW	RUS	Roman Grigorevski
—	MF	EST	Sergei Ignatjev
—	MF	EST	Konstantin Ivanov
5	DF	EST	Oleg Ivanov
—	FW	EST	Dmitri Kolipov
—	GK		Nikita Lembinen

No.	Pos.	Nation	Player
—	GK	EST	Aleksandr Lis
16	GK		Eduard Orehov
15	DF	RUS	Mikhail Slashchev
77	DF	UKR	Oleksandr Sukharov
—	DF	EST	Ilja Šepelev
9	MF	EST	Danil Šišov
6	MF	EST	Jelissei Zahharov
8	MF	RUS	Iraklii Torinava
17	MF	EST	Elmin Tšaban
11	MF	RUS	Alexander Vtorushin

=== Players out on loan ===
Note: Flags indicate national team as defined under FIFA eligibility rules; some limited exceptions apply. Players may hold more than one non-FIFA nationality.

No.	Pos.	Nation	Player
