= JK Kaitseliit Kalev =

Estonian football club

- Full name: JK Kaitseliit Kalev
- Dissolved: 2016
- Ground: Kuusalu Keskkooli staadion, Tallinn

JK Kaitseliit Kalev was an Estonian football club based in Tallinn.
