= JK Luunja =

Estonian football club

- Full name: JK Luunja
- Founded: 2005
- Dissolved: 2016
- Ground: Kaagvere football field, Kaagvere, Mäksa Parish
- Chairman: Indrek Koser
- Manager: Sander Lember
- League: Esiliiga B
- 2016: Esiliiga B, 4th
- Website: http://www.jktammeka.ee/duubelmeeskond/

JK Luunja was an Estonian football club, which originates from Luunja near the city of Tartu. Their home ground was located in nearby Kaagvere village in Mäksa Parish.

In January 2016, they joined with JK Tartu Tammeka and formed Tartu JK Tammeka U21.
