= Kohtla-Järve JK Alko =

Defunct association football club in Estonia

- Full name: Kohtla-Järve JK Alko
- Founded: 1996
- Dissolved: 2012
- Ground: Linnastaadion, Kohtla-Järve
- League: II Liiga Ida/Põhi
- 2011: II Liiga Ida/Põhi, 4th

Kohtla-Järve JK Alko was an Estonian football club based in the town of Kohtla-Järve, in 2012 the club merged with city rivals Kohtla-Järve FC Lootus to form Kohtla-Järve JK Järve.
