= Tartu SK 10 =

Estonian football club

- Full name: Tartu SK 10
- Founded: 1995
- Dissolved: 2013
- Ground: Tartu Annelinna staadion, Tartu
- 2013: Esiliiga, 5th
- Website: http://sk10.ee

Tartu SK 10 was an Estonian football club, playing in the town of Tartu.

== History ==
After winning II Liiga Southern/Western zone in 2011, HaServ was promoted to Esiliiga for the next season. It then merged with SK 10 Premium Tartu and played under the name SK 10 Tartu.
