= Sportland Arena =

Football stadium in Tallinn, Estonia

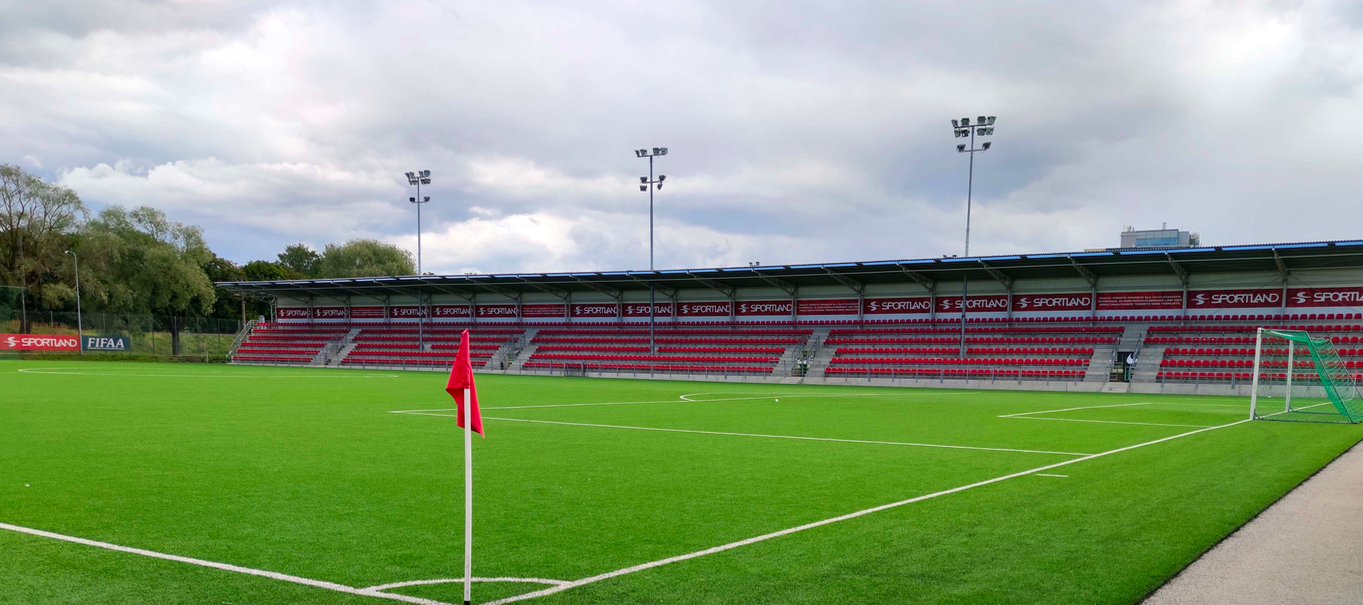
- Former names: A. Le Coq MiniArena
- Location: Tallinn, Estonia
- Coordinates: 59°25′14.7″N 24°44′03.2″E
- Owner: Estonian Football Association
- Operator: Estonian Football Association
- Capacity: 1,198
- Record attendance: 1,303 (FCI Levadia vs. FC Flora, 5 November 2023)
- Field size: 105 × 68 m
- Surface: Artificial turf

Construction
- Opened: 2003
- Renovated: 2018

Tenants
- TJK Legion; FC Flora (during winter); FCI Levadia (during winter); JK Tallinna Kalev (during winter); FC Nõmme United (during winter)

Sportland Arena is a football stadium in Tallinn, Estonia. Located next to Estonia's largest stadium A. Le Coq Arena, it is part of the Lilleküla Football Complex. The stadium is named after the sporting goods retail company Sportland.

Sportland Arena is used as a home ground by TJK Legion. Due to its artificial turf surface and under-soil heating, the stadium also serves as the home ground for FC Flora, FCI Levadia, Tallinna Kalev and Nõmme United in the winter and early spring months.

== History ==
First opened in 2003, the stadium underwent renovation for the 2018 season, for which a 1,198-seat grandstand was constructed on the south side of the ground. The stadium was also awarded the FIFA Quality Pro certificate, which is the highest quality standard for artificial turf football fields.

The start of the 2022 Premium Liiga season saw Sportland Arena used as a home ground by 5 out of the 10 Estonian top-flight teams (Flora, Levadia, Kalju, Kalev, Legion), which resulted in 23 out of the first 45 matches being held in one stadium. In total, Sportland Arena hosted 51 Premium Liiga matches during the 2022 season, meaning 28% of the whole league campaign was played in this stadium. This received heavy criticism by the Estonian football community, who mockingly suggested the league to be renamed as "Sportland Arena Liiga".

== Future ==
The future of Sportland Arena will see the stadium have a capacity of 4,500, so it would be eligible for the UEFA Stadium Category 3 certificate and would thus be able to host international matches. The south stand was constructed in 2018 and the remaining three stands were initially planned to be completed by 2025, but the project has been postponed to an unknown date.

== Record attendances ==
Rank	Attendance	Teams	Competition	Date	Ref
1	1,303	Levadia vs. Flora	Premium Liiga	5 Nov 2023	
2	1,210	Flora vs. Nõmme Kalju	Premium Liiga	11 Nov 2023	
3	1,184	Levadia vs. Flora	Premium Liiga	12 Apr 2025	
4	1,154	Levadia vs. Paide	Premium Liiga	31 Mar 2024	
5	1,123	Flora vs. Levadia	Premium Liiga	23 Apr 2023	

== Gallery ==
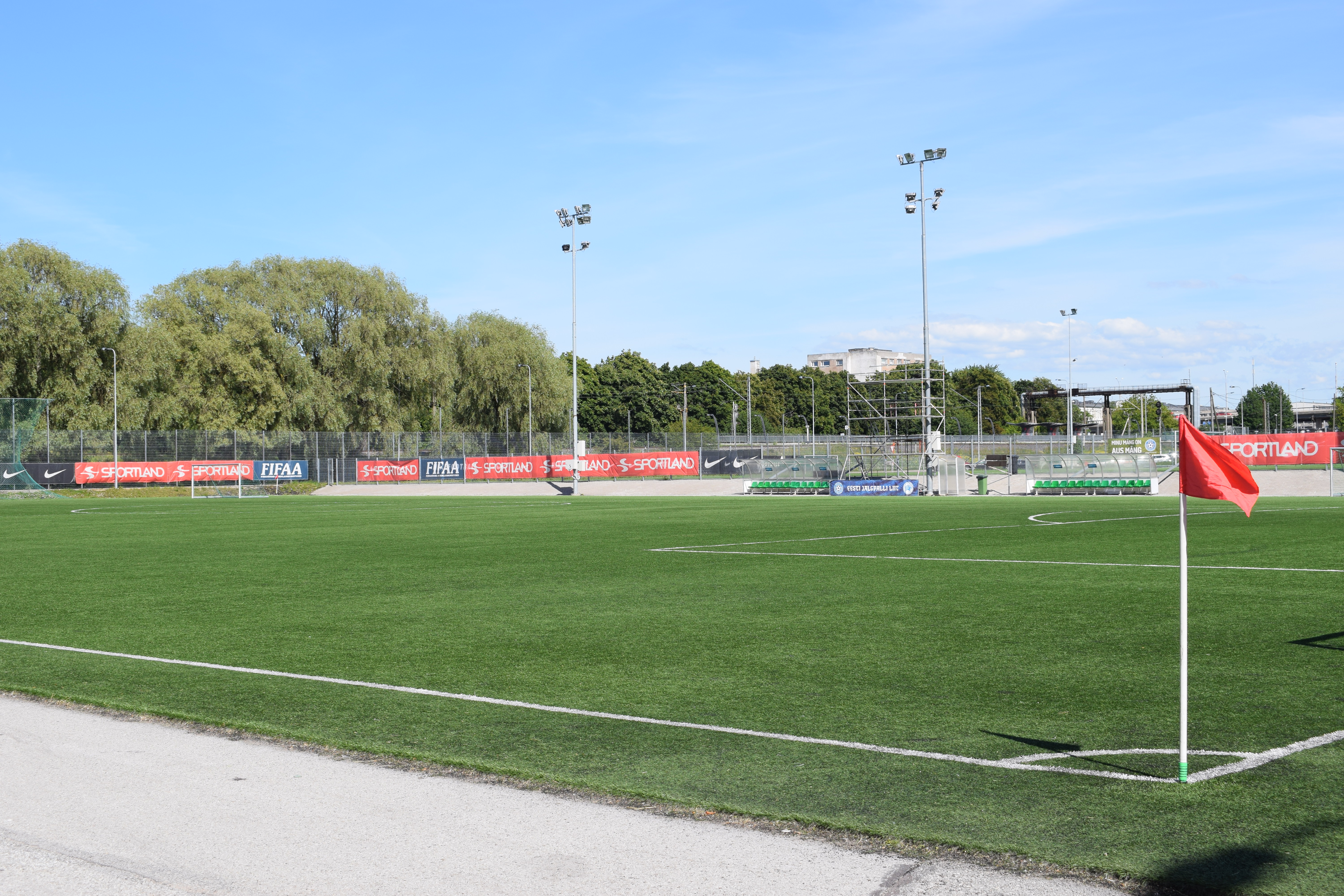
Sportland Arena in 2017

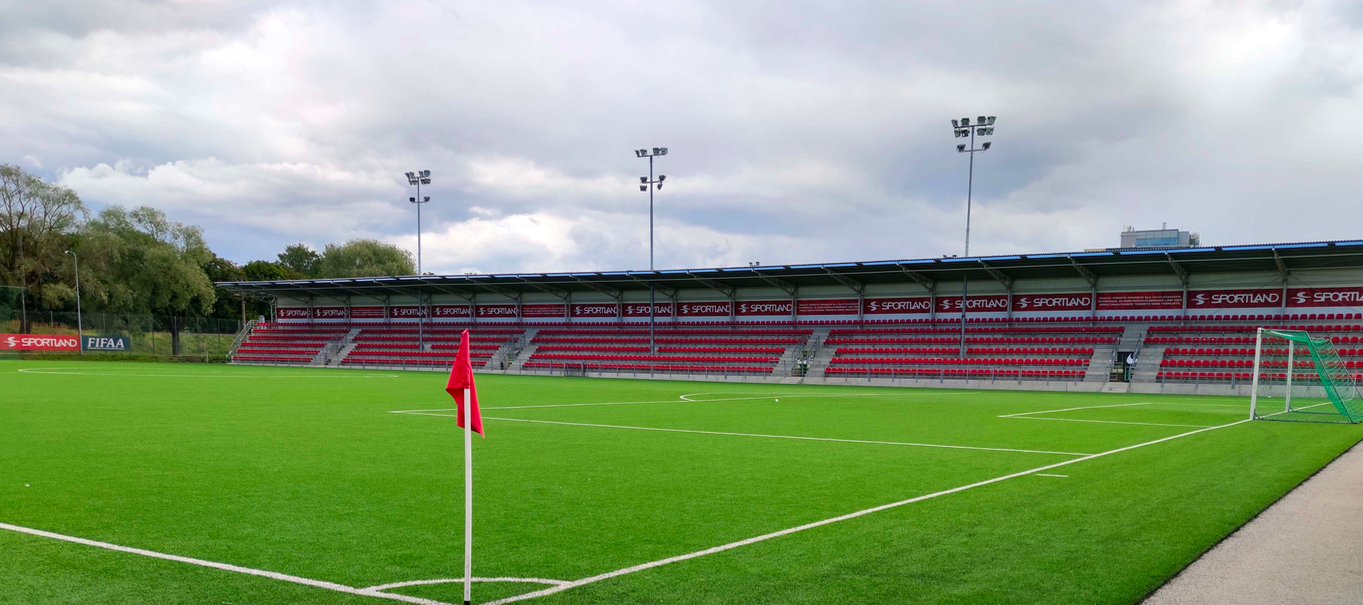
Sportland Arena in 2020
