= 2017 Estonian Small Cup =

Football competition for amateurs

Tournament details
- Country: Estonia
- Teams: 86

Final positions
- Champions: Paide Linnameeskond III
- Runner-up: JK Retro

The 2017 Estonian Small Cup was the 8th season of the Estonian amateur football knockout tournament. The tournament began in March 2017, and the final took place in September 2017 at the A. Le Coq Arena, Tallinn. Tartu FC Merkuur were the defending champions. The 2017 Cup was won by Paide Linnameeskond III.

== First Round (1/64) ==
The draw was made by Estonian Football Association on 7 March 2017.

- League level of the club in the brackets.
- Rahvaliiga RL (people's league) is a league organized by Estonian Football Association, but not part of the main league system.

| Home team | Score | Away team |
22 March
| Raplamaa JK (4) | 1–0 (a.e.t.) | Maardu United (4) |
23 March
| FC Zenit Tallinn (5) | 2–1 | Pärnu JK Vaprus II (4) |
25 March
| Paide Linnameeskond III (5) | 11–1 | Rasmus Värki Jalgpallikool (RL) |
| JK Retro (5) | 17–3 | Viljandi JK Tulevik IV (6) |
| SK Tääksi (5) | 3–2 | FC Somnium (RL) |
| JK Väätsa Vald (5) | 5–0 | Äksi JK (RL) |
| Lihula JK (5) | 3–1 | JK Raudteetöölised (RL) |
26 March
| Rakvere JK Tarvas II (6) | 4–1 | Rumori Calcio II (RL) |
| Tallinna FC Soccernet (6) | 8–0 | FC Tallinna Wolves (RL) |
| FC Icebears (RL) | 1–3 | Kohtla-Nõmme (RL) |
| Tartu Ülikool Fauna (5) | 33–0 | Tatikad Platsil (RL) |
| JK Õismäe Torm (RL) | 4–1 | FC TRT77 (RL) |
| Tallinna JK Jalgpallihaigla (6) | 0–2 | Viimsi Lõvid (RL) |
| Suure-Jaani United (5) | 2–2(a.e.t.) (3–5) p | Rummu Dünamo (5) |
| Tartu JK Welco II (5) | 6–1 | JK Proweb (RL) |
| Tallinna Depoo (6) | 0–5 | Viljandi JK Tulevik III (5) |
29 March
| FC Jõgeva Wolves II (6) | 0–22 | Narva United FC (4) |
| Tallinna FC Ararat TTÜ (4) | 3–2 | Tallinna FC Zapoos (6) |
| FC Otepää (4) | 2–1(a.e.t.) | Lasnamäe FC Ajax (4) |
| JK Loo (5) | 0–3 | Tallinna JK Piraaja (4) |
| Tõrva JK (4) | 2–0 | FC Vastseliina (5) |
| Saue JK Laagri (4) | 18–1 | FC Hiiu United (RL) |

=== Byes ===
These teams were not drawn and secured a place in the second round without playing:

- II Liiga (4): FC Nõmme United, Viimsi JK II, SK Imavere, TJK Legion, Maardu Linnameeskond II, Viljandi JK Tulevik U21, Tartu FC Merkuur
- III Liiga (5): Pirita JK Reliikvia, Kuusalu JK Rada, Ambla Vallameeskond, EMÜ SK, Tartu FC Helios, Kristiine JK, JK Kernu Kajakas, Tallinna FC Hell Hunt, Tallinna FC Castovanni Eagles, Harju JK Laagri, FC Kose, Navi Vutiselts, Tallinna FC Eston Villa, FC Järva-Jaani, FC Tartu, FC Jõgeva Wolves, Läänemaa JK Haapsalu, Pakri SK Alexela, Tartu JK Tammeka U19, Rumori Calcio Tallinn, Pärnu JK Poseidon
- IV Liiga (6): FC Maardu Aliens, Tallinna FC Olympic Olybet, Anija JK, Põlva FC Lootos, Haapsalu JK, Valga FC Warrior, Tallinna FC TransferWise, Pärnu JK Poseidon II, FC Toompea, Kohila Püsivus, Maarjamäe FC Igiliikur, Tallinna FC Reaal
- Rahvaliiga (RL): AC Rapla, FC Puhkus Mehhikos

== Second Round (1/32) ==
The draw was made by Estonian Football Association on 6 April 2017.

- League level of the club in the brackets.
- Rahvaliiga RL (people's league) is a league organized by Estonian Football Association, but not part of the main league system.

| Home team | core | Away team |
18 April
| Tartu JK Welco II (5) | 3–0 | Viljandi JK Tulevik III (5) |
19 April
| FC Tartu (5) | 1–2 | Narva United FC (4) |
| Tallinna FC Hell Hunt (5) | w/o | Maardu Linnameeskond II (4) |
24 April
| Kristiine JK (5) | 2–4 | Pärnu JK Poseidon II (6) |
25 April
| Tartu Ülikool Fauna (5) | w/o | Raplamaa JK (4) |
| Tallinna FC TransferWise (6) | 1–5 | Kuusalu JK Rada (5) |
26 April
| EMÜ SK (5) | 2–3 | Tartu JK Tammeka U19 (5) |
| Rummu Dünamo (5) | w/o | FC Toompea (6) |
| JK Retro (5) | 2–1 | Tallinna JK Legion (4) |
| Navi Vutiselts (5) | 0–7 | JK Väätsa Vald (5) |
| JK Kernu Kadakas (5) | 8–2 | Põlva FC Lootos (6) |
| Tallinna FC Reaal (6) | 2–1 | FC Jõgeva Wolves (5) |
| Anija JK (6) | 14–0 | AC Rapla (RL) |
| Pärnu JK Poseidon (5) | 4–0 | Viimsi Lõvid (RL) |
| Haapsalu JK (6) | 2–1 | Läänemaa JK (5) |
| Saue JK Laagri (4) | 4–1 | SK Tääksi (5) |
| Tallinna FC Eston Villa (5) | 4–1 | FC Maardu Aliens (6) |
| FC Järva-Jaani (5) | 0–1 | FC Zenit Tallinn (5) |
| Tallinna FC Soccernet (6) | 0–6 | Tallinna JK Piraaja (4) |
| Tartu FC Helios (5) | 0–8 | SK Imavere (4) |
| Rumori Calcio Tallinn (5) | 1–5 | Pirita JK Reliikvia (5) |
| Kohila Püsivus (6) | 0–3 | Paide Linnameeskond III (5) |
| FC Puhkus Mehhikos (RL) | 1–11 | Tallinna FC Ararat TTÜ (4) |
| Viljandi JK Tulevik U21 (4) | 2–0 | Tallinna FC Olympic Olybet (6) |
27 April
| Tõrva JK (4) | 0–3 | Lihula JK (5) |
| Tartu FC Merkuur (4) | 6–0 | Harju JK Laagri (5) |
| Maarjamäe FC Igiliikur (6) | 2–0 | FC Kose (5) |
| FC Nõmme United (4) | 4–0 | Tallinna FC Castovanni Eagles (5) |
| JK Õismäe Torm (RL) | 1–1 (a.e.t.) (4–3) p | Rakvere JK Tarvas II (6) |
| Viimsi JK II (4) | 5–1 | Kohtla-Nõmme (RL) |
| Pakri SK Alexela (5) | 3–4 | Valga FC Warrior (6) |
28 April
| Ambla Vallameeskond (5) | 3–4 | FC Otepää (4) |

== Third Round (1/16) ==
The draw was made by Estonian Football Association on 15 May 2017.

- League level of the club in the brackets.
- Rahvaliiga RL (people's league) is a league organized by Estonian Football Association, but not part of the main league system.

| Home team | Score | Away team |
30 May
| Pärnu JK Poseidon (5) | 2–3 | JK Retro (5) |
6 June
| Tartu JK Tammeka U19 (5) | 1–6 | Narva United FC (4) |
| Tallinna FC Reaal (6) | 0–1 | Maarjamäe FC Igiliikur (6) |
7 June
| FC Nõmme United (4) | 4–0 | FC Zenit Tallinn (5) |
| Viljandi JK Tulevik U21 (4) | 2–6 | Tartu FC Merkuur (4) |
| Kuusalu JK Rada (5) | 3–1 | JK Väätsa Vald (5) |
| FC Otepää (4) | 2–2 (a.e.t.) (5–6) p | Saue JK Laagri (4) |
| Viimsi JK II (4) | 0–2 | Tallinna JK Piraaja (4) |
| Rummu Dünamo (5) | 2–1 | Pirita JK Reliikvia (5) |
| Valga FC Warrior (6) | 0–5 | Tallinna FC Hell Hunt (5) |
| Anija JK (6) | 0–2 | Tartu JK Welco II (5) |
| Lihula JK (5) | 1–1 (a.e.t.) (7–8) p | SK Imavere (4) |
| Tallinna FC Eston Villa (5) | 0–5 | Paide Linnameeskond III (5) |
| Pärnu JK Poseidon II (6) | 1–0 | JK Õismäe Torm (RL) |
8 June
| Tallinna FC Ararat TTÜ (4) | 4–1 | JK Kernu Kadakas (5) |
11 June
| Tartu Ülikool Fauna (5) | 1–2 | Haapsalu JK (5) |

== Fourth Round (1/8) ==
The draw was made by Estonian Football Association on 13 June 2017.

- League level of the club in the brackets.

| Home team | Score | Away team |
26 June
| Maarjamäe FC Igiliikur (6) | 2–4 | SK Imavere (4) |
| Pärnu JK Poseidon II (6) | 0–8 | Saue JK Laagri (4) |
| Tartu FC Merkuur (4) | w/o | Haapsalu JK (6) |
| Narva United FC (4) | 2–1 | Tartu JK Welco II (5) |
| Tallinna FC Hell Hunt (5) | 1–3 | FC Nõmme United (4) |
| JK Retro (5) | 2–1 | Tallinna FC Ararat TTÜ (4) |
28 June
| Kuusalu JK Rada (5) | 0–8 | Paide Linnameeskond III (5) |
5 July
| Tallinna JK Piraaja (4) | w/o | Rummu Dünamo (5) |

== Quarter-finals ==
The draw was made on 30 June 2017.

| 2 August 2017 | JK Retro (5) | 4–4 (a.e.t.) (3–1 p) | Saue JK Laagri (4) | Tallinn |
| 18:00 (UTC+3) | Rasmus Munskind 53'; Jüri Jevdokimov 69' (pen.) | (Report) | Argo Alaväli 20'; Janar Pajo 32' | Stadium: EJL TNTK; Attendance: 25; Referee: Teet Allas |

| 2 August 2017 | SK Imavere (4) | 2–1 | Rummu Dünamo (5) | Imavere |
| 19:00 (UTC+3) | Rauno Kiisk 25'; Lauri Reinpõld 39' | (Report) | Stanislav Hmeljov 66' | Stadium: Imavere Jalgpalliväljak; Attendance: 33; Referee: Danel Udu |

| 3 August 2017 | Paide Linnameeskond III (5) | 2–1 | FC Nõmme United (4) | Paide |
| 19:00 (UTC+3) | Ervin Kõll 45'; Eerik Reinsoo 60' | (Report) | Robert Veskimäe 69' | Stadium: Paide linnastaadion Attendance: 250; Referee: Eiko Saar |

| 3 August 2017 | Narva United FC (4) | 3–4 | Tartu FC Merkuur (4) | Narva |
| 19:00 (UTC+3) | Aleksandr Pavlov 6'; Kirill Andrejev 57'; Stanislav Bõstrov 64' | (Report) | Vladislav Gussev 5', 90+3'; Marek Naal 14'; Aleksandr Pruttšenko 84' | Stadium: Narva Kalev-Fama staadion Attendance: 40; Referee: Roman Treial |

== Semi-finals ==
The draw was made on 7 August 2017.

| 23 August 2017 | JK Retro (5) | 7–0 | SK Imavere (4) | Tallinn |
| 18:30 (UTC+3) | Jüri Jevdokimov 9', 33'; Alo Dupikov 45', 54', 80'; Rasmus Munskind 61', 74' | (Report) | | Stadium: EJL TNTK; Attendance: 19; Referee: Martti Pukk |

| 23 August 2017 | Tartu FC Merkuur (4) | 0–1 | Paide Linnameeskond III (5) | Tartu |
| 19:00 (UTC+3) | | (Report) | Priit Raal 68' | Stadium: Tartu Annelinna kunstmurustaadion Attendance: 45; Referee: Marko Liiva |

== Final ==
Two finalists were two III Liiga teams JK Retro and Paide Linnameeskond III.

| 7 September 2017 | JK Retro (5) | 1–5 | Paide Linnameeskond III (5) | Tallinn |
| 19:00 (UTC+3) | Jüri Jevdokimov 70' (pen.) | (Report) | Taavi Laurits 5'; Andre Mägi 47'; Markus Mats Lellsaar 77'; Rauno Rikberg 83'; Volodja Erdei 89' | Stadium: A. Le Coq Arena; Attendance: 337; Referee: Toomas Nõmmiste |

== See also ==
- 2017 Meistriliiga
- 2017 Esiliiga
- 2017 Esiliiga B
- 2016-17 Estonian Cup
- 2017-18 Estonian Cup
