= 2018 Estonian Small Cup =

Estonian football competition for amateurs

Tournament details
- Country: Estonia
- Teams: 67

Final positions
- Champions: Saue JK
- Runners-up: Raasiku FC Joker

The 2018 Estonian Small Cup was the 9th season of the Estonian amateur football knockout tournament. The tournament began in March 2018, and the final took place in September 2018 at the A. Le Coq Arena, Tallinn. Paide Linnameeskond III were the defending champions.

Saue JK won the cup after beating Raasiku FC Joker 2–0 in the final.

== First Round (1/64) ==
The draw was made by Estonian Football Association on 9 March 2018.

- League level of the club in the brackets.
- Rahvaliiga RL (people's league) is a league organized by Estonian Football Association, but not part of the main league system.

Home team	Score	Away team
21 March
Raplamaa JK (4)	0–1	Viimsi JK II (5)
22 March
Viimsi JK (4)	19–0	FC Äksi Wolves (6)
25 March
RL. Rõngu United (RL)	w/o	Tallinna FC Soccernet (6)

=== Byes ===
These teams were not drawn and secured a place in the second round without playing:

- II Liiga (4): Raasiku FC Joker, Paide Linnameeskond III, Tõrva JK, Maardu United, Tartu FC Santos II, Pärnu JK Poseidon, Tallinna JK Legion II, Põhja-Tallinna JK Volta, Türi Ganvix JK, Tallinna JK Piraaja, Tallinna FC Ararat TTÜ
- III Liiga (5): FC Sillamäe, FC Zenit Tallinn, FC Vastseliina, JK Retro, Põhja-Sakala, Tallinna JK Augur, EMÜ SK, JK Loo, Tallinna FC Eston Villa, FC Kose, Anija JK, SK Imavere, Viljandi JK Tulevik III, Nõmme Kalju FC III, FC Järva-Jaani, JK Kernu Kadakas, Valga FC Warrior, Kohila Püsivus, FC Elva II, Pärnu JK Poseidon II, Tartu FC Helios, Ambla Vallameeskond, Tallinna FC Hell Hunt, Saue JK, Rumori Calcio Tallinn
- IV Liiga (6): Maarjamäe FC Igiliikur, Vaimastvere SK Illi, Märjamaa Kompanii, FC Tallinn, Pakri SK Alexela, Tartu JK Tammeka IV, Rummu Dünamo, Tallinna FC TransferWise, Tallinna FC Zapoos, FC Jõgeva Wolves, Põhja-Tallinna JK Volta II, Tallinna JK Jalgpallihaigla, Tallinna FC Reaal, Tartu FC Loomaaed, Maardu United II, FC Toompea, Tartu FC Helios II, Tallinna Depoo
- Rahvaliiga (RL): Maksatransport, FC Tallinna Wolves, Bro Era, Tatikad Platsil, Kohtla-Nõmme, Viimsi Lõvid, Kohtla-Järve SK Zenit

== Second Round (1/32) ==
The draw was made by Estonian Football Association on 2 April 2018.

- League level of the club in the brackets.
- Rahvaliiga RL (people's league) is a league organized by Estonian Football Association, but not part of the main league system.

Home team	Score	Away team
15 April
Anija JK (5)	1–3	Kohtla-Järve SK Zenit (RL)
17 April
Tallinna Depoo (4)	4–3	JK Kernu Kadakas (5)
FC Jõgeva Wolves (5)	2–1	Tallinna JK Augur (5)
Tartu FC Loomaaed (6)	w/o	Märjamaa Kompanii (6)
Raasiku FC Joker (4)	14–2	FC Tallinna Wolves (RL)
18 April
FC Sillamäe (5)	0–6	JK Retro (5)
JK Loo (5)	7–3	Maardu United II (6)
Tõrva JK (4)	1–5	Valga FC Warrior (5)
Tartu FC Helios (5)	2–0	Pärnu JK Poseidon (4)
Kohila Püsivus (5)	w/o	FC Zenit Tallinn (5)
Viimsi JK (4)	3–0	FC Järva-Jaani (5)
Tallinna FC Ararat TTÜ (4)	3–1	Viljandi JK Tulevik III (5)
Tartu FC Santos II (4)	4–0	FC Toompea (6)
FC Kose (5)	2–0	Tartu FC Helios II (6)
Tallinna JK Piraaja (4)	8–1	Maarjamäe FC Igiliikur (6)
FC Tallinn (6)	0–7	Maardu United (4)
Tartu JK Tammeka IV (6)	1–5	Vaimastvere SK Illi (6)
Tallinna JK Legion II (4)	4–1	Tallinna FC Eston Villa (5)
Saue JK (5)	6–1	Tallinna JK Jalgpallihaigla (6)
Tallinna FC Hell Hunt (5)	2–2(a.e.t.) (4–5 p)	Tallinna FC Zapoos (5)
19 April
Nõmme Kalju FC III (5)	w/o	Rõngu United (RL)
Viimsi JK II (5)	4–0	Viimsi Lõvid (RL)
FC Maksatransport (RL)	1–6	Pakri SK Alexela (6)
FC Elva II (5)	2–0	Kohtla-Nõmme (RL)
21 April
FC Vastseliina (5)	w/o	Bro Era (RL)
24 April
Tallinna FC Reaal (6)	0–4	Põhja-Tallinna JK Volta II (5)
25 April
Türi Ganvix JK (4)	1–4	Põhja-Sakala (5)
Pärnu JK Poseidon II(5)	1–5	SK Imavere (5)
Rumori Calcio Tallinn (5)	1–7	Põhja-Tallinna JK Volta (4)
Tallinna FC TransferWise (5)	1–2	Rummu Dünamo (5)
26 April
EMÜ SK (5)	w/o	Taktikad Platsil (RL)
Paide Linnameeskond III (4)	6–2	Ambla Vallameeskond (5)

== Third Round (1/16) ==
The draw was made by Estonian Football Association on 26 April 2018.

- League level of the club in the brackets.
- Rahvaliiga RL (people's league) is a league organized by Estonian Football Association, but not part of the main league system.

Home team	Score	Away team
15 May
Tallinna FC Ararat TTÜ (4)	8–0	Rummu Dünamo (5)
16 May
Tartu FC Santos II (4)	3–1	SK Imavere (5)
Paide Linnameeskond III (4)	7–3	JK Loo (5)
FC Elva II (5)	2–0	Valga FC Warrior (5)
JK Retro (5)	4–2	FC Jõgeva Wolves (5)
Saue JK (5)	7–2	Vaimastvere SK Illi (6)
Pakri SK Alexela (6)	3–2	Viimsi JK II (5)
Põhja-Tallinna JK Volta (4)	5–1	Kohila Püsivus (5)
Tallinna FC Zapoos (5)	3–1	Tallinna JK Legion II (4)
17 May
Põhja-Sakala (5)	2–1	Põhja-Tallinna JK Volta II (5)
Tallinna Depoo (6)	1–3	Tartu FC Helios (5)
Bro Era (RL)	0–12	Viimsi JK (4)
Raasiku FC Joker (4)	5–2	FC Kose (5)
Kohtla-Järve SK Zenit (RL)	1–3	EMÜ SK (5)
Tallinna JK Piraaja (4)	6–0	Maardu United (4)
Rõngu United (RL)	0–2	Märjamaa Kompanii (6)

== Fourth Round (1/8) ==
The draw was made by Estonian Football Association on 23 May 2018.

- League level of the club in the brackets.
- Rahvaliiga RL (people's league) is a league organized by Estonian Football Association, but not part of the main league system.

Home team	Score	Away team
5 June
JK Retro (5)	1–0	Tallinna JK Piraaja (4)
FC Elva II (5)	0–6	Paide Linnameeskond III (4)
6 June
Raasiku FC Joker (4)	3–3(a.e.t.) (3–0 p)	Viimsi JK (4)
Tartu FC Helios (5)	0–2	Saue JK (5)
Tartu FC Santos II (4)	0–3	Märjamaa Kompanii (6)
Tallinna FC Ararat TTÜ (4)	5–1	EMÜ SK (5)
14 June
Tallinna FC Zapoos (5)	3–6(a.e.t.)	Pakri SK Alexela (6)
20 June
Põhja-Sakala (5)	3–3(a.e.t.) (5–6 p)	Põhja-Tallinna JK Volta (4)

== Quarter-finals ==
The draw was made on 15 June 2018.

1 August 2018	Pakri SK Alexela (6)	3–1	Paide Linnameeskond III (4)	Paldiski
19:00 (UTC+3)	Meelis Reiss 10', 87', 90+5'	Report	Volodja Erdei 19'	Stadium: Alexela Arena; Attendance: 89; Referee: Kristo Värva

1 August 2018	Raasiku FC Joker (4)	2–1	Märjamaa Kompanii (6)	Raasiku
19:00 (UTC+3)	Rando Randjõe 5'; Janar Pragi 32'	Report	Olavi Arel Abel 65'	Stadium: Raasiku põhikooli kuntsmuruväljak Attendance: 76; Referee: Paul Kask

8 August 2018	JK Retro (5)	2–3	Saue JK (5)	Tallinn
19:00 (UTC+3)	Dmitry Skiperskiy 3'; Alo Dupikov 49'	Report	Markus Seppam 39'; Argo Alaväli 62' (pen.); Künter Uku Altnurme 87'	Stadium: EJL TNTK staadion Attendance: 17; Referee: Johann Kuldmäe

8 August 2018	Tallinna FC Ararat TTÜ (4)	2--	Põhja-Tallinna JK Volta (4)	Tallinn
19:00 (UTC+3)	Denys Zakharets 15', 20'	Report		Stadium: Wismari staadion Attendance: 58; Referee: Andres Jahimaa

== Semi-finals ==
The draw was made on 2 August 2018.

22 August 2018	Tallinna FC Ararat TTÜ (4)	1–2	Saue JK (5)	Tallinn
21:00 (UTC+3)	Sergei Lefanov 40'	Report	Kristjan Suurjärv 33' (pen.) 66'	Stadium: Kalevi keskstaadioni kunstmuruväljak Attendance: 50; Referee: Denis Petrov

23 August 2018	Pakri SK Alexela (6)	0–1	Raasiku FC Joker (4)	Paldiski
19:30 (UTC+3)		Report	Andre Ilves 6'	Stadium: Paldiski Alexela Arena; Attendance: 214; Referee: Tanel Üprus

== Final ==
The two finalist were Saue JK, who reached quarter-finals the previous season, and Raasiku FC Joker, who enjoyed third-tier football last year. Both teams are from Harju County.

12 September 2018	Raasiku FC Joker (4)	0–2	Saue JK (5)	Tallinn
19:00 (UTC+3)		Report	Janar Pajo 65'; Holger Suvi 78'	Stadium: A. Le Coq Arena; Attendance: 693; Referee: Paul Kask

== See also ==
- 2017 Meistriliiga
- 2017 Esiliiga
- 2017 Esiliiga B
- 2017-18 Estonian Cup
