= 2023–24 Estonian Cup =

Estonian football competition

Tournament details
- Country: Estonia
- Dates: 7 June 2023 – 25 May 2024
- Teams: 72

Final positions
- Champions: FCI Levadia
- Runners-up: Paide Linnameeskond

Tournament statistics
- Matches played: 71
- Goals scored: 403 (5.68 per match)

The 2023–24 Estonian Cup was the 34th season of the main domestic football knockout tournament in Estonia.

FCI Levadia won the cup on 25 May 2024 (their eleventh Estonian Cup win), defeating Paide Linnameeskond 4–2 in the final. Since they qualified for the Conference League based on league position, the spot for winning the cup was passed to the fourth-placed team of the 2023 Meistriliiga.

== First round ==
Team 1	Score	Team 2
18 June 2023
Tallinna TransferWise	1–0	Tallinna Wolves
21 June 2023
Tallinna Zenit	3–1	Hiiumaa
Tabasalu Ulasabat	4–0	Flora U19
Kristiine	2–3 (a.e.t.)	Kohvile
Tartu Kalev	9–0	Sssolutions
22 June 2023
Tallinna Kalev	20–0	Vana Hea Puur
Viimsi	4–0	Paide Linnameeskond III
Põhja-Tallinna Volta	2–4	Rumori Calcio Tallinn
Tallinna Kalev III	0–10	Legion
12 July 2023
Jõgeva Wolves	0–8	Kuressaare
Keila	11–0	Jalgpallihaigla
14 July 2023
Drakon	0–12	Nõmme United

== Round of 64 ==
Team 1	Score	Team 2
7 June 2023
Sillamäe Kalev	0–4	Kose
21 June 2023
Tallinna Eston Villa	3–0	Märjamaa Kompanii
22 June 2023
Saku Sporting	2–3	Tallinna Kalev U21
28 June 2023
Tallinna Zapoos	6–0	Vändra Vaprus
12 July 2023
Harju	12–0	Pelgu City
15 July 2023
Tartu Welco	0–4	Tallinna Kalev
16 July 2023
Elva	1–0	Saue
25 July 2023
Maardu Aliens	w/o	Tallinn
26 July 2023
Kuressaare	w/o	Järva-Jaani
Tartu Welco II	2–3	Tartu Kalev
Pärnu Tervis	8–3 (a.e.t.)	FCP Pärnu
Warrior Valga	1–6	Pärnu Poseidon
27 July 2023
Flora U21	2–0	Keila
Legion II	3–1	Tallinna Soccernet
28 July 2023
Tammeka	w/o	Imavere
29 July 2023
Nõmme United	w/o	Piraaja Tallinn
Raplamaa	1–5	Läänemaa
Tallinna Maksatransport	5–1	Loo
Tartu Team Helm	2–0	Pärnu Jalgpalliklubi
30 July 2023
Rumori Calcio Tallinn	3–8	Tallinna Zenit
31 July 2023
Kohvile	0–3	Viimsi
1 August 2023
Vaprus	6–1	Alliance
Tallinna TransferWise	0–3	Tulevik
2 August 2023
Nõmme Kalju	4–0	Tabasalu Ulasabat
Legion	3–0	Jõhvi Phoenix
Aruküla Vigri	3–2	Flora IV
Tallinna Gorillad	0–16	Tabasalu
Tallinna Olympic Olybet	3–0	Rumori Calcio Tallinn II

== Round of 32 ==
The draw for the round was also made on 28 July 2023.

Team 1	Score	Team 2
16 August 2023
Tartu Kalev	2–6	FCI Levadia
22 August 2023
Elva	5–2	Pärnu Tervis
Nõmme United	11–1	Tallinna Eston Villa
23 August 2023
Narva Trans	5–0	Tallinna Zenit
Tallinna Zapoos	1–4	Tallinna Kalev
29 August 2023
Tallinna Maksatransport	0–3	Läänemaa
30 August 2023
Tartu Team Helm	3–7	Tallinna Kalev U21
6 September 2023
Pärnu Poseidon	2–3 (a.e.t.)	Aruküla Vigri
9 September 2023
Kuressaare	9–1	Kose
11 September 2023
Nõmme Kalju	5–1	Tulevik
Tallinna Olympic Olybet	0–8	Harju
13 September 2023
Flora U21	13–0	Legion II
20 September 2023
Legion	1–3	Tammeka
14 October 2023
Tallinn	1–1 (5–6 p)	Viimsi
18 October 2023
Tabasalu	1–3 (a.e.t.)	Paide Linnameeskond
25 November 2023
Flora	1–0	Vaprus

== Round of 16 ==
The draw for the round was made on 13 September 2023.

Team 1	Score	Team 2
14 October 2023
Nõmme Kalju	3–1	Harju
18 October 2023
Läänemaa	9–1	Aruküla Vigri
18 November 2023
Viimsi	1–0	Narva Trans
24 November 2023
Paide Linnameeskond	4–0	Tallinna Kalev U21
FCI Levadia	4–2	Tammeka
25 November 2023
Kuressaare	4–2	Flora U21
26 November 2023
Tallinna Kalev	3–1	Nõmme United
3 December 2023
Flora	10–0	Elva

== Quarter-finals ==
The draw for the quarter-finals was made on 26 February 2024.

Team 1	Score	Team 2
9 April 2024
FCI Levadia	2–1	Flora
10 April 2024
Läänemaa	0–3	Viimsi
Nõmme Kalju	2–1	Tallinna Kalev
Paide Linnameeskond	2–0	Kuressaare

== Semi-finals ==
The draw for the semi-finals was made on 11 April 2024.

Team 1	Score	Team 2
8 May 2024
Paide Linnameeskond	3–1	Nõmme Kalju
FCI Levadia	1–0 (a.e.t.)	Viimsi

== Final ==
25 May 2024	FCI Levadia	4–2	Paide Linnameeskond	Tallinn
19:00 (UTC+3)	Ainsalu 48'; Yusif 55' (o.g.); Pedro 73'; Schjønning-Larsen 82'	Report	Saarma 12'; Agyepong 35'	Stadium: Lilleküla Stadium; Attendance: 2,612; Referee: Kristo Külljastinen
