= 2024–25 Estonian Cup =

Estonian football competition

Tournament details
- Country: Estonia
- Dates: 12 June 2024 – 24 May 2025
- Teams: 66

Final positions
- Champions: Nõmme Kalju
- Runners-up: FCI Levadia

Tournament statistics
- Matches played: 69
- Goals scored: 423 (6.13 per match)

The 2024–25 Estonian Cup was the 35th season of the main domestic football knockout tournament in Estonia.

Nõmme Kalju won the cup on 24 May 2025 (their second Estonian Cup win), defeating defending cup holders FCI Levadia 4–1 on penalties after a 3–3 draw. Since they qualified for the Conference League based on league position, the spot for winning the cup was passed to the fourth-placed team of the 2024 Meistriliiga (Flora).

== First round ==
Team 1	Score	Team 2
12 June 2024
Legion	3–1	Raplamaa
Viimsi	0–1	Kuressaare
Vastseliina	5–0	Vana Hea Puur
Kohtla-Järve Linnameeskond	4–0	Tallinna Soccernet
13 June 2024
Tulevik	2–1 (a.e.t.)	Tallinna Zealot Sporting
19 June 2024
Tallinna Kalev III	0–6	Tabasalu
26 June 2024
Tallinna Tamper	4–1	Pärnu Poseidon
27 June 2024
Flora U21	4–0	Saue
30 July 2024
Kose	1–6	Tartu Kalev
31 July 2024
Kose II	0–26	Harju

== Round of 64 ==
The draw for the round was also made on 30 May 2024.

Team 1	Score	Team 2
6 July 2024
Tallinna Zapoos	4–3	Sillamäe Silmet
23 July 2024
Saare Latte	2–6	Hiiumaa
Läänemaa	5–1	Rumori Calcio Tallinn
27 July 2024
Vastseliina	1–5	Tabasalu Ulasabat
28 July 2024
Tallinna EstHam United	0–4	Tartu Inter
29 July 2024
Tallinna Tamper	3–1	Tartu Welco II
30 July 2024
Tulevik	3–0	Järva-Jaani
Kuusalu Kalev	0–4	Tartu Helios
Tallinna Smsraha	1–3	Tallinna Ararat
31 July 2024
Tartu Welco	2–3 (a.e.t.)	Flora U21
Maardu Aliens	0–12	Kuressaare
Nõmme United	9–0	Kohtla-Järve Linnameeskond
Nõmme Kalju	11–1	Tallinna Eston Villa
Saku Sporting	1–2	Tallinn
Jõhvi Phoenix	3–1	Kohvile
Kristiine	0–5	Legion
Tallinna Maksatransport	3–1	Pärnu Jalgpalliklubi
Põlva FC Lootos	0–3	Tallinna Starmedia
1 August 2024
Flora U19	0–6	Tallinna Kalev U21
Tallinna Hell Hunt	1–3	Tabasalu
6 August 2024
Kubik	3–4 (a.e.t.)	Märjamaa Kompanii
Tallinna Wolves	0–8	Elva
7 August 2024
Tallinna GameSport	0–24	Tammeka
Vaprus	11–0	Tallinna Olympic Olybet
Tallinna TransferWise	0–15	Harju
Loo	2–4	Tartu Team Helm
13 August 2024
Narva Trans	7–0	Aruküla Vigri
14 August 2024
Tartu Kalev	7–0	Pelgu City

== Round of 32 ==
The draw for the round was made on 1 August 2024.

Team 1	Score	Team 2
13 August 2024
Legion (3)	3–3 (4–1 p)	Jõhvi Phoenix (3)
14 August 2024
Flora U21 (2)	0–7	Nõmme Kalju (1)
Tallinna Kalev U21 (2)	2–5	Tallinna Zapoos (4)
Harju (2)	3–0	Nõmme United (1)
21 August 2024
Tartu Helios (4)	1–3 (a.e.t.)	Hiiumaa (4)
Tallinna Kalev (1)	14–0	Tartu Inter (5)
27 August 2024
Märjamaa Kompanii (5)	0–2	Tabasalu (2)
28 August 2024
Vaprus (1)	10–0	Tallinna Ararat (4)
Tartu Team Helm (5)	1–5	Elva (2)
4 September 2024
Kuressaare (1)	7–0	Tartu Kalev (3)
Tallinna Maksatransport (5)	0–3	Tallinna Tamper (5)
7 September 2024
Narva Trans (1)	6–1	Tallinna Starmedia (5)
11 September 2024
FCI Levadia (1)	8–1	Tulevik (3)
9 October 2024
Tabasalu Ulasabat (4)	1–6	Läänemaa (3)
15 October 2024
Tallinn (2)	2–1	Tammeka (1)
30 October 2024
Flora (1)	0–2	Paide Linnameeskond (1)

== Round of 16 ==
The round of 16 draw was made on 6 September 2024.

Team 1	Score	Team 2
30 October 2024
Hiiumaa (4)	2–3	Tallinna Zapoos (4)
Elva (2)	1–3	FCI Levadia (1)
Tallinna Tamper (5)	0–9	Nõmme Kalju (1)
Vaprus (1)	3–0	Läänemaa (3)
31 October 2024
Harju (2)	0–3	Narva Trans (1)
Tabasalu (2)	1–3	Tallinn (2)
Tallinna Kalev (1)	3–0	Legion (3)
23 November 2024
Paide Linnameeskond (1)	2–1	Kuressaare (1)

== Quarter-finals ==
The draw for the quarter-finals was made on 22 February 2025.

Team 1	Score	Team 2
4 March 2025
FCI Levadia (1)	7–0	Tallinna Zapoos (4)
Narva Trans (1)	3–1	Vaprus (1)
5 March 2025
Nõmme Kalju (1)	1–0	Paide Linnameeskond (1)
Tallinn (2)	0–5	Tallinna Kalev (1)

== Semi-finals ==
The draw for the semi-finals was made on 10 March 2025.

Team 1	Score	Team 2
13 May 2025
Tallinna Kalev (1)	0–5	Nõmme Kalju (1)
14 May 2025
FCI Levadia (1)	1–0	Narva Trans (1)

== Final ==
The final was held between the two semi-final winners.

24 May 2025	Nõmme Kalju	3–3 (a.e.t.) (4–1 p)	FCI Levadia	Tallinn
19:00 (UTC+3)	Kask 72'; Jabir 80'; Ivanov 86' (pen.)	Report	Ainsalu 17'; Pedro 48' (pen.); Lepistu 89'	Stadium: Lilleküla Stadium; Attendance: 1,512; Referee: Joonas Jaanovits
	Penalties
	Tarassenkov (penalty scored); Orlov (penalty scored); Siht (penalty scored); Tambedou (penalty scored)		Ainsalu (penalty scored); Tur (penalty missed); Zakarlyuka (penalty missed)
