= 2025–26 Estonian Cup =

Estonian football competition

Tournament details
- Country: Estonia
- Teams: 71

Final positions
- Champions: Flora
- Runners-up: Paide Linnameeskond

The 2025–26 Estonian Cup was the 36th season of the main domestic football knockout tournament in Estonia. The winners qualified for the 2026–27 UEFA Conference League first qualifying round. Nõmme Kalju were the defending cup holders.

Flora won the cup on 23 May 2026 (their ninth Estonian Cup win), defeating Paide Linnameeskond 5–1 in the final. Since they qualified for the Champions League via league position, the Conference League spot awarded to the cup winners was passed to the fourth-placed team of the 2025 Meistriliiga (Paide Linnameeskond).

== First round ==
22 clubs entered the first round. The draw was held on 20 May 2025, alongside the Round of 64 draw.

Team 1	Score	Team 2
10 June 2025
Märjamaa Kompanii	4–0	Kubik
11 June 2025
Tallinna Kalev U21	6–0	Vana Hea Puur
Tartu Kalev	1–2	Elva
Tartu Welco	16–0	Kuusalu Kalev
JK Arsenal	2–4 (a.e.t.)	Rae Spordikool
12 June 2025
Keila JK	5–2	Kallaste United
Tallinna Hell Hunt	2–0	Põlva Lootos
Tallinna Wolves	6–4	Tallinna Soccernet
18 June 2025
Raplamaa	1–5	Saku Sporting
Tallinna Olympic Olybet	0–6	Tulevik
17 July 2025
Läänemaa	2–1	Kohtla-Järve Linnameeskond

== Round of 64 ==
45 clubs entered the Round of 64 alongside the 11 first round winners; the top four teams of the 2024 Meistriliiga (FCI Levadia, Flora, Nõmme Kalju, and Paide Linnameeskond) received byes. The draw was held on 20 May 2025, alongside the first round draw.

Team 1	Score	Team 2
2 July 2025
Hiiumaa	0–3	Tallinna Kalev
10 July 2025
Viimsi	7–1	TalTech
22 July 2025
Harju	26–0	Tallinna TransferWise
23 July 2025
Jõhvi Phoenix	w/o	Kose II
25 July 2025
Tartu Welco II	0–8	Narva Trans
Kose	0–7	Kuressaare
Nõmme United	5–1	Harju III
Tammeka	6–0	Tabasalu
26 July 2025
Maardu Aliens	1–4	Pärnu Poseidon
Tallinna Kalev III	9–0	Tallinna EstHam United
Tabasalu Ulasabat	13–0	Tallinna Eston Villa
Tallinna Tamper	4–2	Rumori Calcio Tallinn
27 July 2025
Tallinna Wolves	3–4	Raasiku Joker
29 July 2025
Tallinn	7–1	Tallinna Zealot Sporting
30 July 2025
Elva	3–0	Legion
Flora U18	1–12	Flora U21
Flora U19	w/o	Vastseliina
Vaprus	13–0	Tulevik
Aruküla Vigri	0–4	Kristiine
31 July 2025
Saku Sporting	3–2	Märjamaa Kompanii
1 August 2025
Kohvile	0–4	Tartu Team Helm
2 August 2025
Kohtla-Järve Lootus	1–10	Rae Spordikool
6 August 2025
Järva-Jaani	1–4	Keila JK
Viimsi Lovid	0–7	Tallinna Smsraha
Tallinna Zapoos	7–0	Tallinna Hell Hunt
13 August 2025
Saue	6–1	Tallinna Maksatransport
Tartu Welco	3–0	Tartu Helios
Tallinna Kalev U21	2–0	Läänemaa

== Round of 32 ==
The 28 Round of 64 winners and 4 teams given byes entered the Round of 32.

Team 1	Score	Team 2
12 August 2025
Flora U19	1–8	Tammeka
13 August 2025
Kuressaare	1–2	Paide Linnameeskond
Jõhvi Phoenix	1–6	Nõmme Kalju
19 August 2025
Vaprus	9–0	Keila JK
20 August 2025
Elva	3–2	Tallinna Smsraha
Flora	14–0	Tartu Team Helm
Raasiku Joker	1–4	Nõmme United
27 August 2025
Pärnu Poseidon	1–0	Tallinna Kalev U21
Rae Spordikool	0–9	Tallinn
Tabasalu Ulasabat	0–3	Harju
3 September 2025
Tallinna Kalev III	1–8	Tallinna Kalev
Viimsi	4–1	Tallinna Tamper
Tallinna Zapoos	3–0	Saku Sporting
7 September 2025
Saue	0–4	Narva Trans
10 September 2025
Tartu Welco	8–0	Kristiine
12 October 2025
FCI Levadia	4–0	Flora U21

== Round of 16 ==
The 16 Round of 32 winners entered the Round of 16.

Team 1	Score	Team 2
15 October 2025
Pärnu Poseidon	0–6	Tartu Welco
29 October 2025
Flora	3–1 (a.e.t.)	FCI Levadia
Paide Linnameeskond	3–0	Tammeka
Tallinna Zapoos	2–4	Vaprus
30 October 2025
Harju	0–1	Nõmme United
Nõmme Kalju	0–1	Viimsi
Narva Trans	6–0	Tallinn
Elva	1–2	Tallinna Kalev

== Quarter-finals ==
The draw for the quarter-finals was made on 21 February 2026.

Team 1	Score	Team 2
10 March 2026
Flora	3–1	Nõmme United
Vaprus	2–1	Tartu Welco
11 March 2026
Narva Trans	4–3	Viimsi
Paide Linnameeskond	6–0	Tallinna Kalev

== Semi-finals ==
The draw for the semi-finals was made on 12 March 2026.

Team 1	Score	Team 2
5 May 2026
Flora	1–0	Narva Trans
6 May 2026
Paide Linnameeskond	2–0	Vaprus

== Final ==
The final was held between the two semi-final winners.

23 May 2026	Paide Linnameeskond	1–5	Flora	Pärnu
17:00	Sohna 82'		Zenjov 12', 63'; Alamaa 44'; Andrade 58' (o.g.); Sappinen 73'	Stadium: Pärnu Rannastaadion; Referee: Karl Koppel
