= 2019 II liiga =

Estonian football league season for fourth division

II liiga
- Season: 2019

The 2019 II liiga is the 25th season of the II liiga, fourth-highest league for association football clubs in Estonia. The top 2 teams are promoted to 1 liiga, the third highest league for association football clubs in Estonia

== II liiga North/East ==
II liiga North/East
- Season: 2019
- Dates: 22 March - 26 October
- Matches played: 112
- Goals scored: 464 (4.14 per match)
- Top goalscorer: Sander Pabo; Vassili Kulik (15 goals each)
- Biggest home win: FCI Tallinn 9-0 Wolves; Trans II 9-0 Tammeka III
- Biggest away win: Järve II 0-7 Sillamäe Kalev; Wolves 2-9 Legion II
- Highest scoring: Trans II 9-5 Järve II
- Highest attendance: 120; Trans II 0-3 Legion II (10 May 2019)
- Lowest attendance: 3 Santos 1-3 FCI Tallinn (11 May 2019)
- Total attendance: 3,954
- Average attendance: 37

=== 2019 season ===
2019 II N/E liiga consists of 14 different teams. Nine of them remain the same, two were promoted from III liiga, two were relegated from higher divisions and one club (Tallinna JK Legion II) transferred from the last year's II liiga S/W. Promoted teams were Põhja-Tallinna JK Volta II and FC Jõgeva Wolves while relegated clubs were Lasnamäe FC Ajax and Tartu FC Santos. These teams replaced Tartu Santos II (dissolved), Põhja-Tallinna JK Volta (promoted), Maardu United (relegated), Raasiku FC Joker and Tallinna JK Piraaja (transferred to II S/W Liiga).

==== Clubs ====
The following clubs are competing in II liiga North/East during the 2019 season.

Club	2018	Location	Titles	Last best finish
Ajax	9th in Esiliiga B	Tallinn	1	1st (2002)
Ararat	7th	Tallinn	0	3rd (2008)
FCI Tallinn	2nd	Tallinn	0	2nd (2018)
Järve II	8th	Jõhvi	0	8th (2018)
Legion II	6th in II liiga S/W	Tallinn	0	–
Maardu LM II	10th	Maardu	0	10th (2017)
Noorus	4th	Jõgeva	0	4th (2018)
Santos	7th in Esiliiga	Tartu	0	–
Sillamäe	3rd	Sillamäe	2	1st (2000)
Tammeka III	12th	Tartu	0	12th (2018)
Trans II	6th	Narva	0	4th (2016)
Volta II ^{a}	2nd in III liiga West	Tallinn	0	–
Welco II	9th	Tartu	0	9th (2018)
Wolves	4th in III liiga South	Jõgeva	0	–

^{a} – ineligible for promotion to Esiliiga B

=== Results ===
==== League table ====
Pos	Team	Pld	W	D	L	GF	GA	GD	Pts	Promotion, qualification or relegation
1	FCI Tallinn	26	20	4	2	85	24	+61	64	Promotion to Esiliiga B
2	Sillamäe Kalev	26	18	5	3	70	24	+46	59	Qualification to Promotion play-offs
3	Narva Trans II	26	18	2	6	98	39	+59	56	
4	Tallinna Legion II	18	11	3	4	49	23	+26	36	
5	Tartu Welco II	18	10	2	6	37	23	+14	32	
6	Maardu Linnameeskond II	18	8	4	6	36	26	+10	28	
7	Põhja-Tallinna Volta II (Note: Reserve teams are ineligible for promotion.)	18	8	3	7	36	41	−5	27	
8	Jõgeva Noorus-96	18	7	1	10	22	38	−16	22	
9	Tallinna Ararat	18	6	4	8	32	31	+1	22	
10	Tartu Tammeka III	18	5	1	12	25	37	−12	16	
11	Kohtla-Järve Järve II	18	5	1	12	29	61	−32	16	
12	Jõgeva Wolves	18	4	3	11	31	63	−32	15	Qualification to Relegation play-offs
13	Lasnamäe Ajax	18	4	2	12	28	62	−34	14	Relegation to III Liiga
14	Tartu Santos	18	3	4	11	26	51	−25	13	Relegation to III Liiga

Updated to match(es) played on 26 Oktober 2019. Source:
Rules for classification: 1) points; 2) goal difference; 3) number of goals scored

==== Results table ====
Location of the 2018 II liiga N/E teams

Home \ Away	AJA	ARA	FCI	JÄR	LEG	MLM	NRS	SAN	SIL	TAM	TRA	VOL	WEL	WOL
Lasnamäe Ajax	—		0–6			1–4		7–1	0–0		5–3	3–3	0–4	2–3
Tallinna Ararat	3–0	—	2–6	4–0		0–0	2–1			3–2	2–4	2–3	1–1	5–2
FCI Tallinn			—	4–0	3–2	0–1	6–0		2–1	2–0	6–0	3–1		9–0
Kohtla-Järve Järve II	0–1	2–5	4–1	—	0–2		0–1		0–7				1–0	5–3
Tallinna Legion II	3–0	1–0		0–3	—			7–0	0–0	2–1		3–0	0–2	7–1
Maardu Linnameeskond II	4–0		1–3	5–2	3–3	—	1–2	2–1		0–0	2–4			5–1
Jõgeva Noorus-96	4–0	2–1		3–1	1–2		—	2–1	0–3			2–0	0–2	1–1
Tartu Santos	1–2	0–0	1–3	4–4		0–2		—	7–0	1–0		2–2	2–2	2–1
Sillamäe Kalev	7–0	2–0	1–1		2–2	5–2		5–0	—		1–3		2–0	2–1
Tartu Tammeka III	2–0	3–1	1–2	4–0	1–2		5–3	2–1	0–3	—	1–2			
Narva Trans II	10–4			9–5	0–3	1–0	6–0	7–0	0–0	9–0	—	5–0		
Põhja-Tallinna Volta II	4–3			7–2		1–1	1–0		0–2	2–1	4–1	—	1–2	3–2
Tartu Welco II		0–4	0–2	6–0	4–1	1–0	4–0			2–1	0–3	2–3	—	
Jõgeva Wolves		2–2	3–3		2–9	1–3	2–0	3–2		2–1	0–2		2–5	—

Updated to match(es) played on 1 September 2019. Source: Jalgpall.ee
Legend: Blue = home team win; Yellow = draw; Red = away team win.

=== Statistics ===
==== Top scorers ====
As of 18 August 2019.

Rank	Player	Club	Goals
1	(Estonia) Vassili Kulik	Sillamäe Kalev	15
1	(Estonia) Sander Pabo	FCI Tallinn	15
3	(Estonia) Eduard Kovbasnjuk	Jõgeva Wolves	12
4	(Estonia) Nikita Mihhailov	Narva Trans II	11
4	(Ukraine) Denys Zakharets	Tallinna Ararat	11
4	(Estonia) Artur Aus	Tartu Welco II	11
7	(Estonia) Nikita Dronov	Maardu Linnameeskond II	10
8	(Estonia) Raigo Kuusik	Tartu Welco II	9
9	(Estonia) Aleksandr Jurõšev	Narva Trans II	8
9	(Russia) Aleksandr Zakarluika	Narva Trans II	8

==== Most viewed matches ====
As of 18 August 2019.

Home team	Away team	Score	Attendance
Narva Trans II	Tallinna Legion II	0–3	120
Tartu Tammeka III	Tartu Santos	2–1	107
Sillamäe Kalev	Maardu Linnameeskond II	5–2	106

==== Least viewed matches ====
As of 18 August 2019.

Home team	Away team	Score	Attendance
Tartu FC Santos	FCI Tallinn	1–3	3
Põhja-Tallinna Volta II	Tartu Tammeka III	2–1	5
Tartu Welco II	Tallinna Ararat	0–4	7

Team statistics

Teams	Top home attendance	Low. home attendance	Avg. home attendance	Avg. away attendance	Home attendance	Fair play
Lasnamäe FC Ajax	52	12	33	37	228	3.884
Tallinna FC Ararat TTÜ	70	13	33	26	312	3.854
FCI Tallinn	46	11	32	30	257	4.198
Kohtla-Järve JK Järve II	48	22	32	32	193	4.021
Tallinn Legion II	55	17	37	51	296	3.906
Maardu Linnameeskond II	65	19	40	51	317	3.979
Jõgeva SK Noorus-96	48	15	25	25	201	3.584
Tartu FC Santos	44	3	23	46	203	3.771
JK Sillamäe Kalev	106	25	63	37	502	4.198
Tartu JK Tammeka III	107	27	46	37	367	4.061
Narva JK Trans II	120	21	65	42	517	4.208
Põhja-Tallinna JK Volta II	35	5	21	41	146	4.022
Tartu JK Welco II	46	8	29	19	203	3.657
FC Jõgeva Wolves	50	12	30	40	212	3.699

== II liiga South/West ==
=== 2019 season ===
II liiga South/West
- Season: 2019

2019 II S/W Liiga consists of 14 different teams. Eight of them remain the same. Three league winners were promoted from III liiga. They were Põhja-Sakala, Viimsi JK II, FC Kose. Two teams were transferred from II liiga N/E. They were Raasiku FC Joker and Tallinna JK Piraaja with the sixth new teaming joining from the higher division (FC Flora U19). These teams replaced Viimsi JK and Tabasalu JK (both promoted), Tallinna JK Legion II (transferred to II liiga N/E) Tõrva JK, JK Ganvix Türi and FC Otepää (all relegated).

==== Clubs ====
Location of the 2018 II liiga S/W teams

=== Results ===
==== League table ====
Pos	Team	Pld	W	D	L	GF	GA	GD	Pts	Promotion, qualification or relegation
1	Paide Linnameeskond III (Note: Reserve teams are ineligible for promotion.)	18	13	4	1	71	15	+56	43	
2	Tallinna Kalev III	18	13	3	2	55	21	+34	42	Promotion to Esiliiga B
3	Läänemaa	18	11	1	6	55	50	+5	34	Qualification to Promotion play-offs
4	Pärnu Vaprus II	18	9	3	6	35	29	+6	30	
5	Flora U19	18	10	0	8	40	42	−2	30	
6	Kuressaare II	18	9	1	8	39	28	+11	28	
7	Põhja-Sakala	18	8	2	8	34	32	+2	26	
8	Tallinna Piraaja	18	7	5	6	43	37	+6	26	
9	Viimsi II	18	7	3	8	30	35	−5	24	
10	Viljandi Tulevik U21	18	7	1	10	30	45	−15	22	
11	Raplamaa	18	6	3	9	28	38	−10	21	
12	Raasiku Joker	18	5	1	12	23	41	−18	16	Qualification to Relegation play-offs
13	Pärnu Poseidon	18	4	2	12	26	58	−32	14	Relegation to III Liiga
14	Kose	18	2	1	15	18	56	−38	7	Relegation to III Liiga

Updated to match(es) played on 1 September 2019. Source:
Rules for classification: 1) points; 2) goal difference; 3) number of goals scored

=== Statistics ===
Attendances
