= 2018 III liiga =

Estonian football league season for fifth division

III liiga
- Season: 2018

The 2018 III liiga is the 21st season of the III liiga, fifth-highest league for association football clubs in Estonia.

== III Liiga North ==
=== 2018 season ===
III liiga North
- Number of clubs: 12
- Current champions: Põhja-Tallinna JK Volta (2017)
- Website: III liiga

Location of the 2018 III Liiga N teams

The following clubs are competing in II liiga North/East during the 2018 season.

- Tallinna JK Dünamo
- Tallinna FC Hell Hunt
- JK Retro
- Tallinna FC Eston Villa
- Rumori Calcio Tallinn
- Harju JK Laagri
- Saku Sporting
- Nõmme Kalju FC III
- FC Zenit Tallinn
- Tallinna FC TransferWise
- Tallinna FC Zapoos
- Tallinna KSK FC Štrommi

=== Results ===
League table

Pos	Team	Pld	W	D	L	GF	GA	GD	Pts	Promotion, qualification or relegation
1	Retro (C, P)	22	17	1	4	80	34	+46	52	Promotion to II Liiga
2	Tallinna Zapoos (Q)	22	13	2	7	69	52	+17	41	Qualification to Promotion play-offs
3	Harju Laagri	22	13	2	7	55	42	+13	41	
4	Tallinna Zenit	22	10	5	7	63	47	+16	35	
5	Tallinna Hell Hunt	22	10	2	10	74	46	+28	32	
6	Rumori Calcio	22	8	7	7	46	39	+7	31	
7	Saku Sporting	22	9	2	11	55	47	+8	29	
8	Tallinna Štrommi	22	8	3	11	29	83	−54	27	
9	Tallinna Dünamo	22	8	3	11	37	50	−13	27	
10	Tallinna Eston Villa (Q)	22	8	2	12	48	50	−2	26	Qualification to Relegation play-offs
11	Nõmme Kalju III (R)	22	4	6	12	28	54	−26	18	Relegation to IV Liiga
12	Tallinna TransferWise (R)	22	4	3	15	42	82	−40	15	Relegation to IV Liiga

Updated to match(es) played on 14 October 2018. Source:
Rules for classification: 1) points; 2) goal difference; 3) number of goals scored
(C) Champions; (P) Promoted; (Q) Qualified for the phase indicated; (R) Relegated

Results table

Home \ Away	DÜN	ESV	HAR	HEL	KLJ	RET	RUM	SAK	ŠTR	ZAP	ZEN	TRA
Tallinna Dünamo	—	2–1	0–4	2–4	3–0	w/o (Note: Match awarded to Tallinna JK Dünamo, because JK Retro fielded an ineligible player.)	1–0	1–0	2–5	5–1	w/o (Note: Match awarded to no one, because both teams fielded an ineligible player.)	3–2
Tallinna Eston Villa	1–1	—	4–1	1–3	w/o (Note: Match awarded to Nõmme Kalju FC III, because Tallinna FC Eston Villa fielded a disqualified player.)	1–4	1–0	3–1	5–1	1–4	1–3	1–1
Harju Laagri	4–2	5–2	—	2–1	1–1	1–5	1–4	2–0	2–1	4–1	2–3	1–0
Tallinna Hell Hunt	5–1	3–0	0–1	—	8–0	10–3	1–3	4–6	1–2	4–0	2–3	2–3
Nõmme Kalju III	0–0	2–4	0–2	2–0	—	6–2	2–2	2–2	1–2	1–3	0–4	w/o (Note: Match awarded to Tallinna FC TransferWise, because Nõmme Kalju FC III fielded an ineligible player.)
Retro	4–2	5–2	4–1	3–0	4–0	—	3–0	2–0	6–0	3–1	4–1	2–0
Rumori Calcio	2–3	4–0	3–1	3–3	3–3	0–1	—	3–1	3–0	3–3	3–2	3–3
Saku Sporting	3–0	4–2	1–2	5–2	2–3	2–3	2–0	—	5–0	0–5	4–2	5–3
Tallinna Štrommi	2–1	3–2	0–13	1–9	w/o (Note: Match awarded to Tallinna KSK FC Štrommi, because Nõmme Kalju FC III fielded an ineligible player.)	2–10	0–0	1–1	—	2–3	2–1	0–7
Tallinna Zapoos	4–1	1–9	7–0	2–4	2–0	3–1	1–1	2–1	w/o (Note: Match awarded to Tallinna FC Zapoos, because Tallinna KSK FC Štrommi fielded an ineligible player.)	—	8–3	7–2
Tallinna Zenit	5–5	0–3	3–3	2–2	4–2	1–1	5–1	2–1	0–0	7–0	—	8–0
Tallinna TransferWise	3–2	2–4	0–2	1–6	3–3	1–10	2–5	3–9	2–3	0–2	3–4	—

Updated to match(es) played on 14 October 2018. Source: Jalgpall.ee
Legend: Blue = home team win; Yellow = draw; Red = away team win.

=== Statistics ===
Top scorers

As of 14 October 2018.

Rank	Player	Club	Goals
1	(Russia) Dmitry Skiperskiy	Retro	41
2	(Estonia) Jaan Sinka	Tallinna Hell Hunt	25
2	(Estonia) Ken-Glaid Nool	Harju Laagri	25
4	(Estonia) Reber Gruzdev	Rumori Calcio	19
5	(Estonia) Markus Mikko	Tallinna Zapoos	17
5	(Estonia) Mihkel Heinaste	Tallinna Hell Hunt	17
7	(Estonia) Kevin Mätas	Tallinna Zapoos	12
7	(Russia) Anton Bolotin	Tallinna TransferWise	12
9	(Estonia) Jürgen Orumaa	Tallinna Zapoos	11
10	(Germany) Robin Sindberg	Tallinna TransferWise	10

Most viewed matches

As of 17 October 2018.

Home team	Away team	Score	Attendance
Saku Sporting	Tallinna Štrommi	5–0	120
Saku Sporting	Tallinna Zapoos	0–5	85
Saku Sporting	Tallinna Dünamo	3–0	72

Least viewed matches

As of 17 October 2018.

Home team	Away team	Score	Attendance
Tallinna Hell Hunt	Retro	10–3	2
Tallinna Hell Hunt	Tallinna Eston Villa	3–0	3
Zenit Tallinn	Tallinna Eston Villa	0–3	3
Retro	Tallinna Štrommi	6–0	3

== III Liiga South ==
=== 2018 season ===
III liiga South
- Number of clubs: 12
- Current champions: Tartu JK Welco II (2017)
- Website: III liiga

Location of the 2018 III Liiga S teams

The following clubs are competing in III liiga South during the 2018 season.

- SK Imavere
- FC Tarvastu
- FC Vastseliina
- Viljandi JK Tulevik III
- Põhja-Sakala
- FC Jõgeva Wolves
- EMÜ SK
- Valga FC Warrior
- Võru FC Helios II
- Tartu FC Helios
- FC Elva II
- Põlva FC Lootos

=== Results ===
League table

Pos	Team	Pld	W	D	L	GF	GA	GD	Pts	Promotion, qualification or relegation
1	Põhja-Sakala (C, P)	22	15	1	6	72	44	+28	46	Promotion to II Liiga
2	Imavere (Q)	22	14	1	7	54	44	+10	43	Qualification to Promotion play-offs
3	Tarvastu	22	13	3	6	73	38	+35	42	
4	Jõgeva Wolves	22	12	3	7	73	58	+15	39	
5	Vastseliina	22	12	3	7	66	58	+8	39	
6	Viljandi Tulevik III (Note: Reserve teams are ineligible for promotion.)	22	12	2	8	73	45	+28	38	
7	Valga Warrior	22	9	2	11	60	72	−12	29	
8	EMÜ	22	7	4	11	44	77	−33	25	
9	Elva II	22	7	3	12	40	37	+3	24	
10	Võru Helios II (Q)	22	6	3	13	39	50	−11	21	Qualification to Relegation play-offs
11	Tartu Helios (R)	22	5	3	14	44	82	−38	18	Relegation to IV Liiga
12	Põlva Lootos (R)	22	6	0	16	39	72	−33	18	Relegation to IV Liiga

Updated to match(es) played on 13 October 2018. Source:
Rules for classification: 1) points; 2) goal difference; 3) number of goals scored
(C) Champions; (P) Promoted; (Q) Qualified for the phase indicated; (R) Relegated
Notes:

Results table

Home \ Away	ELV	EMÜ	IMA	JÕG	LOO	PSA	THE	TAR	TUL	VAS	VHE	WAR
Elva II	—	0–1	1–2	2–2	2–0	6–0	4–2	6–0	1–0	1–2	1–3	1–2
EMÜ	1–1	—	2–3	1–7	3–1	2–3	5–3	2–2	3–1	1–3	0–2	2–2
Imavere	5–1	5–0	—	3–2	w/o (Note: Match awarded to SK Imavere, because Põlva FC Lootos forfeited the match.)	1–2	4–2	1–1	2–1	w/o (Note: Match awarded to FC Vastseliina, because SK Imavere fielded an ineligible player.)	7–3	3–2
Jõgeva Wolves	1–4	2–1	2–1	—	8–3	w/o (Note: Match awarded to FC Jõgeva Wolves, because Põhja-Sakala fielded an ineligible player.)	4–1	w/o (Note: Match awarded to FC Jõgeva Wolves, because FC Tarvastu forfeited the match.)	6–0	7–4	2–1	4–4
Põlva Lootos	3–1	4–3	3–2	1–2	—	1–3	10–2	0–5	0–3	2–5	w/o (Note: Match awarded to Võru FC Helios II, because Põlva FC Lootos fielded an ineligible player.)	2–1
Põhja-Sakala	4–1	2–3	0–2	9–2	3–0	—	8–2	2–4	3–1	4–2	3–2	6–1
Tartu Helios	1–1	2–4	1–2	0–8	5–1	0–8	—	w/o (Note: Match awarded to FC Tarvastu, because Tartu FC Helios fielded an ineligible player.)	4–2	5–0	1–1	3–2
Tarvastu	3–1	10–1	2–0	5–1	3–2	2–3	3–2	—	2–2	6–1	4–1	1–2
Viljandi Tulevik III	1–4	11–2	6–1	6–2	10–1	2–0	3–1	3–4	—	4–1	3–1	6–4
Vastseliina	1–0	7–0	5–0	5–2	4–1	4–4	4–4	3–9	0–0	—	6–1	3–2
Võru Helios II	1–0	3–3	2–4	2–2	1–3	0–1	0–1	1–0	1–2	1–2	—	5–0
Valga Warrior	2–1	3–4	4–6	5–4	3–1	3–4	3–2	4–2	2–6	4–2	5–4	—

Updated to match(es) played on 13 October 2018. Source: Jalgpall.ee
Legend: Blue = home team win; Yellow = draw; Red = away team win.

=== Statistics ===
Top scorers

As of 13 October 2018.

Rank	Player	Club	Goals
1	(Estonia) Rasmus Alles	Viljandi Tulevik III	30
2	(Estonia) Erki Alliksoo	Vastseliina	29
3	(Estonia) Eduard Kovbasnjuk	Jõgeva Wolves	21
4	(Estonia) Marko Murumaa	Jõgeva Wolves	19
5	(Estonia) Mark Ivanov	Valga Warrior	18
5	(Estonia) Margus Terras	Põhja-Sakala	18
7	(Estonia) Kaido Kaljula	Põhja-Sakala	17
8	(Estonia) Sander Rõivassepp	Valga Warrior	14
8	(Estonia) Tarvi Suvi	Tartu Helios	14
8	(Estonia) Sten Kase	Põhja-Sakala	14

Most viewed matches

As of 13 August 2018.

Home team	Away team	Score	Attendance
Tarvastu	Vastseliina	6–1	93
Jõgeva Wolves	Võru Helios II	2–1	86
Põhja-Sakala	Elva II	3–2	70

Least viewed matches

As of 1 September 2018.

Home team	Away team	Score	Attendance
Imavere	Jõgeva Wolves	3–2	8
EMÜ	Põhja-Sakala	2–3	8

== III Liiga East ==
=== 2018 season ===
III liiga East
- Number of clubs: 12
- Current champions: Paide Linnameeskond III (2017)
- Website: III liiga

Location of the 2018 III liiga E teams

The following clubs are competing in III liiga East during the 2018 season.

- Viimsi JK II
- FCI Tallinn II
- FC Sillamäe
- FC Järva-Jaani
- Koeru JK
- Ambla Vallameeskond
- JK Loo
- Anija JK
- Tallinna JK Augur
- Lasnamäe FC Ajax II
- Kadrina SK
- Rakvere JK Tarvas II

=== Results ===
League table

Pos	Team	Pld	W	D	L	GF	GA	GD	Pts	Promotion, qualification or relegation
1	Viimsi II (Note: Reserve teams are ineligible for promotion.) (C, P)	22	18	2	2	53	17	+36	56	Promotion to II Liiga
2	Loo (Q)	22	13	4	5	60	35	+25	43	Qualification to Promotion play-offs
3	Lasnamäe Ajax II	22	13	2	7	54	41	+13	41	
4	Koeru	22	11	3	8	51	31	+20	36	
5	Augur	22	10	1	11	43	39	+4	31	
6	Sillamäe	22	9	3	10	42	49	−7	30	
7	FCI Tallinn II	22	8	4	10	28	39	−11	28	
8	Anija	22	8	4	10	26	39	−13	28	
9	Järva-Jaani	22	8	3	11	58	51	+7	27	
10	Kadrina (Q)	22	7	4	11	30	43	−13	25	Qualification to Relegation play-offs
11	Ambla Vallameeskond (R)	22	7	1	14	37	48	−11	22	Relegation to IV Liiga
12	Rakvere Tarvas II (R)	22	3	3	16	17	67	−50	12	Relegation to IV Liiga

Updated to match(es) played on 13 October 2018. Source:
Rules for classification: 1) points; 2) goal difference; 3) number of goals scored
(C) Champions; (P) Promoted; (Q) Qualified for the phase indicated; (R) Relegated
Notes:

Results table

Home \ Away	AJA	AMB	ANI	AUG	FCI	JÄR	KAD	KOE	LOO	SIL	TAR	VII
Lasnamäe Ajax II	—	4–1	4–1	4–1	0–1	3–3	2–1	2–3	2–4	0–2	2–0	4–2
Ambla Vallameeskond	0–1	—	2–1	1–3	0–3	4–2	0–3	2–1	2–4	2–3	1–2	1–2
Anija	1–1	2–1	—	1–0	0–5	0–2	0–3	0–6	2–0	2–0	3–1	0–1
Augur	2–3	4–0	4–1	—	2–0	4–0	2–0	1–1	1–2	5–2	2–0	0–1
FCI Tallinn II	3–1	0–5	0–0	0–1	—	3–1	1–1	0–2	3–7	4–2	0–0	0–1
Järva-Jaani	w/o (Note: Match awarded to Lasnamäe FC Ajax II, because FC Järva-Jaani fielded an ineligible player.)	4–2	2–4	7–2	8–0	—	5–1	3–2	3–3	3–3	7–0	1–2
Kadrina	3–4	0–2	1–2	2–4	w/o (Note: Match awarded to FCI Tallinn II, because SK Kadrina fielded an ineligible player.)	2–0	—	0–0	1–1	3–2	2–0	1–3
Koeru	2–4	3–3	2–0	2–0	0–1	2–1	9–0	—	0–3	w/o (Note: Match awarded to Koeru JK, because FC Sillamäe forfeited the match.)	4–0	0–1
Loo	5–0	2–0	1–4	3–2	2–0	4–0	0–0	2–4	—	6–1	3–0	3–3
Sillamäe	4–6	1–2	1–1	2–1	2–0	2–1	1–4	4–2	3–0	—	3–2	2–0
Rakvere Tarvas II	1–4	0–5	0–0	4–2	2–1	1–5	1–2	0–6	1–4	2–2	—	0–5
Viimsi II	1–0	3–1	2–1	3–0	2–2	4–0	3–0	4–0	3–1	3–0	4–0	—

Updated to match(es) played on 13 October 2018. Source: Jalgpall.ee
Legend: Blue = home team win; Yellow = draw; Red = away team win.

=== Statistics ===
Top scorers

As of 13 October 2018.

Rank	Player	Club	Goals
1	(Estonia) Andrei Kobjakov	Lasnamäe Ajax II	22
1	(Estonia) Matis Jürgen	Koeru	22
3	(Estonia) Raido Vespere	Järva-Jaani	20
4	(Estonia) Marten Orav	Loo	15
5	(Estonia) Siim Allmann	Loo	14
6	(Estonia) Lauri Randma	Viimsi II	13
7	(Estonia) Nevil Krimm	Sillamäe	12
8	(Estonia) Rauno Kütt	Tallinna Augur	11
9	(Ukraine) Oleksandr Saietov	Lasnamäe Ajax II	9
10	(Estonia) Arto Saar	Järva-Jaani	8

Most viewed matches

As of 1 September 2018.

Home team	Away team	Score	Attendance
Järva-Jaani	Rakvere Tarvas II	7–0	95
Järva-Jaani	FCI Tallinn II	8–0	67
Anija	Järva-Jaani	0–2	67

Least viewed matches

As of 1 September 2018.

Home team	Away team	Score	Attendance
Rakvere Tarvas II	Lasnamäe Ajax II	1–4	3
Loo	Anija	1–4	4
FCI Tallinn II	Ambla VM	0–5	5

== III Liiga West ==
=== 2018 season ===
III liiga West
- Number of clubs: 12
- Current champions: Pärnu JK Poseidon (2017)
- Website: III liiga

Location of the 2018 III Liiga W teams

The following clubs are competing in III liiga West during the 2018 season.

- Saue JK
- Põhja-Tallinna JK Volta II
- Lihula JK
- FC Hiiumaa
- Rummu Dünamo
- FC Kose
- JK Kernu Kadakas
- Haapsalu JK
- Kohila Püsivus
- Pärnu JK Poseidon II
- Keila JK II
- Vändra JK Vaprus II

=== Results ===
League table

Pos	Team	Pld	W	D	L	GF	GA	GD	Pts	Promotion, qualification or relegation
1	Kose (C, P)	22	18	4	0	97	22	+75	58	Promotion to II Liiga
2	Põhja-Tallinna Volta II (Note: Reserve teams are ineligible for promotion.) (Q)	22	15	2	5	85	38	+47	47	Qualification to Promotion play-offs
3	Saue	22	14	3	5	84	35	+49	45	
4	Haapsalu	22	11	2	9	55	53	+2	35	
5	Hiiumaa	22	9	7	6	52	38	+14	34	
6	Kohila Püsivus	22	10	3	9	30	41	−11	33	
7	Rummu Dünamo	22	10	2	10	51	45	+6	32	
8	Kernu Kadakas	22	7	3	12	37	48	−11	24	
9	Keila II	22	7	3	12	36	64	−28	24	
10	Pärnu Poseidon II (Q)	22	5	5	12	30	72	−42	20	Qualification to Relegation play-offs
11	Lihula (R)	22	4	4	14	37	70	−33	16	Relegation to IV Liiga
12	Vändra Vaprus II (R)	22	2	2	18	32	100	−68	8	Relegation to IV Liiga

Updated to match(es) played on 14 October 2018. Source:
Rules for classification: 1) points; 2) goal difference; 3) number of goals scored
(C) Champions; (P) Promoted; (Q) Qualified for the phase indicated; (R) Relegated
Notes:

Results table

Home \ Away	HAA	HII	KEI	KER	KOS	LIH	POS	PÜS	RUM	SAU	VOL	VAP
Haapsalu		3–2	0–1 (Note: HAAvKEI note?)	0–2	0–3	3–1	2–2	1–0 (Note: HAAvPÜS note?)	4–2	2–6	9–1	5–1
Hiiumaa	3–1		3–0	3–2	1–2	3–1	1–1	1–1	0–3	1–0	2–0	6–0
Keila II	1–6	3–3		3–0	0–8	4–2	5–0	5–0	1–3	1–4	0–3	3–2
Kernu Kadakas	1–1	4–4	4–1		1–2	4–3	2–1	2–3	1–0	2–4	1–3	6–0
Kose	6–0	1–1	6–1	6–1		5–1	10–1	3–1	2–1	5–1	2–2	8–1
Lihula	4–3	2–2	0–1	1–0	0–7		2–3	2–0	3–3	2–2	0–4	2–4
Pärnu Poseidon II	2–3	1–0	1–1	1–0	1–5	4–2		2–2	0–5	2–2	0–5	3–1
Kohila Püsivus	4–0 (Note: PÜSvHAA note?)	0–6	2–4	3–0	1–3	1–1	1–0		1–2	+–- (Note: PÜSvSAU note?)	2–1	2–0
Rummu Dünamo	1–3	1–3	2–0	0–0	2–3	8–1	3–2	0–1		3–5	3–2	5–3
Saue	3–4	4–2	5–0	3–0 (Note: SAUvKER note?)	3–3	4–0	9–2	4–0	5–0		1–0	10–0
Põhja-Tallinna Volta II	6–3	4–1	7–0	6–2	1–1	5–2	7–0	4–1	4–1	4–3		9–2
Vändra Vaprus II	1–2	4–4	2–2	0–2	1–6	0–5	4–1	1–3	1–3	2–6	2–7	

Source: Jalgpall.ee
Legend: Blue = home team win; Yellow = draw; Red = away team win.

=== Statistics ===
Top scorers

As of 13 October 2018.

Rank	Player	Club	Goals
1	(Estonia) Pelle Pohlak	Kose	32
2	(Estonia) Timo Erkki Huttunen	Põhja-Tallinna Volta II	22
2	(Estonia) Kristjan Suurjärv	Saue	22
4	(Estonia) Joonas Meer	Kernu Kadakas	18
5	(Estonia) Sander Laur	Hiiumaa	13
6	(Estonia) Dmitri Andrejev	Haapsalu	12
6	(Estonia) Rene Aljas	Kose	12
6	(Estonia) Denis Andrejev	Haapsalu	12
6	(Estonia) Lauri Mihkelson	Kose	12
10	(Estonia) Henrik Kummer	Keila II	10

Most viewed matches

As of 1 September 2018.

Home team	Away team	Score	Attendance
Saue	Lihula	4–0	133
Haapsalu	Saue	2–6	82
Kohila Püsivus	Hiiumaa	0–6	76

Least viewed matches

As of 1 September 2018.

Home team	Away team	Score	Attendance
Põhja-Tallinna Volta II	Kohila Püsivus	4–1	5
Kernu Kadakas	Haapsalu	1–1	6
Põhja-Tallinna Volta II	Lihula	5–2	7
Põhja-Tallinna Volta II	Vändra Vaprus II	9–2	7

== Post-Season ==
League winner

21 October 2018 Semi-Final	Viimsi JK II (III E 1st)	2–1	JK Retro (III N 1st)	Viimsi, Harjumaa
13:30	Riigov 67'; Lõhmus 83'	Report	Skiperskiy 35'	Stadium: Viimsi KK staadion Attendance: 27; Referee: Karl Koppel

21 October 2018 Semi-Final	FC Kose (III W 1st)	1–3	Põhja-Sakala (III S 1st)	Kose, Harjumaa
13:00	Mikk Rajaver	Report	Domberg 32'; Kase 68', 90+3'	Stadium: Oru Põhikooli staadion Attendance: 37; Referee: Viljar Pennert

27 October 2018 Final	Viimsi JK II (III E 1st)	0–2	Põhja-Sakala (III S 1st)	Viimsi, Harjumaa
12.00		Report	Kalistratov 63' (pen.); Vorobjov 85'	Stadium: Viimsi KK staadion Attendance: 36; Referee: Paul Kask

Promotion Play-offs

20 October 2018 Semi-final	Tallinna FC Zapoos (III N 2nd)	–:+	JK Loo (III E 2nd)	Tallinn, Harjumaa
12.00		Report		Stadium: Kalevi Keskstaadioni kunstmuruväljak Referee: Paul Kask

25 October 2018 Semi-final	JK Loo (III E 2nd)	+:–	Tallinna FC Zapoos (III N 2nd)	Loo, Harjumaa
19.00		Report		Stadium: Loo kunstmuruväljak

4 November 2018 Final	JK Loo (III E 2nd)	2–3	Tartu JK Tammeka III (II N/E 12th)	Loo, Harjumaa
14:00	Kubber 24'; Allmann 73'	Report	Enno 2', 13'; Toomsalu 86'	Stadium: Loo kunstmuruväljak Attendance: 8 Referee: Martti Pukk

11. November 2018 Final	Tartu JK Tammeka III (II N/E 12th)	3–0	JK Loo (III E 2nd)	Tartu, Tartumaa
15:00	Enno 27'; Palu 57' (o.g.); Pärn 60'	Report		Stadium: Tartu Sepa jalgpallikeskuse kunstmuruväljak Attendance: 27; Referee: Viljar Pennert

20 October 2018 Semi-final	SK Imavere (III S 2nd)	–:+	Põhja-Tallinna JK Volta II (III W 2nd)	Järva, Järvamaa
13.00				Stadium: Imavere stadium

27 October 2018 Semi-final	Põhja-Tallinna JK Volta II (III W 2nd)	+:–	SK Imavere (III S 2nd)	Tallinn, Harjumaa
18.00		Report		Stadium: Sõle jalgpallihall

4 November 2018 Final	Põhja-Tallinna JK Volta II (III W 2nd)	3–1	Tõrva JK (II S/W 12th)	Tallinn, Harjumaa
20:00	Huttunen 43', 83'; Ovsijenko 57'	Report	Külm 37' (pen.)	Stadium: Sõle jalgpallihall Attendance: 16; Referee: Kristjan-Eric Lääne

11 November 2018 Final	Tõrva JK (II S/W 12th)	1–4	Põhja-Tallinna JK Volta II (III W 2nd)	Karksi-Nuia, Viljandimaa
14:00	Orlo 71'	Report	Huttunen 43'; Harkmann 69' (pen.); Põld 74'; Kivi 90+1'	Stadium: Karksi-Nuia Gümnaasiumi staadion Attendance: 14; Referee: Andrus Õun

Relegation Play-offs

21 October 2018 Final	Maardu United II (IV N/E 4th)	4–0	Pärnu JK Poseidon II (III W 10th)	Maardu, Harjumaa
14:00	Pavlov 33', 90'; Plaksin 42'; Russakov 81'	Report		Stadium: Maardu kunstmuruväljak Attendance: 51; Referee: Aleksei Latõnin

29 October 2018 Final	Pärnu JK Poseidon II (III W 10th)	2–5	Maardu United II (IV N/E 4th)	Pärnu, Harjumaa
19:00	Voolmaa 9'; Lulla 32'	Report	Shahmarov 10'; Tomaševitš 24'; laksin 43'; Afonin 79'; Babakin 87'	Stadium: Pärnu kunstmurustaadion Attendance: 18; Referee: Margus Leedo

21 October 2018 Final	Kristiine JK (IV N/W 4th)	1–6	Tallinna FC Eston Villa (III N 10th)	Tallinn, Harjumaa
15:30	Hinn 39' (o.g.)	Report	Berg 10' (pen.); Tabor 22', 52', 73'; Linder 35'; Oganezov 88'	Stadium: Wismari staadion Attendance: 16; Referee: Timo Teniste

24 October 2018 Final	Tallinna FC Eston Villa (III N 10th)	7–2	Kristiine JK (IV N/W 4th)	Tallinn, Harjumaa
20:30	Linder 6', 39', 48', 89'; Oja 67'; Leemets 69'; Hinn 83'	Report	Talviste 62'; Leppik 81'	Stadium: Sõle jalgpallihall Attendance: 18; Referee: Paul Kask

21 October 2018 Final	SK Kadrina (III E 10th)	+:-	FC Toompea (IV N/W 5th)

28 October 2018 Final	FC Toompea (IV N/W 5th)	–:+	SK Kadrina (III E 10th)

21 October 2018 Final	Tartu JK Tammeka IV (IV S 3rd)	0–1	Võru FC Helios II (III S 10th)	Tartu, Tartumaa
15:00		Report	Saar 11'	Stadium: Tartu Sepa jalgpallikeskuse kunstmuruväljak Attendance: 34; Referee: Enar Nilp

28 October 2018 Final	Võru FC Helios II (III S 10th)	4–0	Tartu JK Tammeka IV (IV S 3rd)	Võru, Võrumaa
14:00	Piir 4', 25'; Org 15'; Saar 70'	Report		Stadium: Võru Jalgpallikeskuse kunstmuruväljak Attendance: 40; Referee: Marko Liiva
