= 2019–20 Estonian Cup =

30th season of the Estonian main domestic football

Tournament details
- Country: Estonia
- Teams: 89

Final positions
- Champions: Flora (8th title)
- Runners-up: Narva Trans

Tournament statistics
- Matches played: 88
- Goals scored: 490 (5.57 per match)

The 2019–20 Estonian Cup was the 30th season of the Estonian main domestic football knockout tournament. Flora won their eight title after defeating Narva Trans in the final. The winner of the Cup were to qualify for the first qualifying round of the 2020–21 UEFA Europa League, but as Flora were already qualified for the Champions League the spot passed on to Paide Linnameeskond.

== First round (1/64) ==
The draw was made by Estonian Football Association on 25 May 2019.

- League level of the club in the brackets.
- Rahvaliiga RL (people's league) is a league organized by Estonian Football Association, but not part of the main league system.

Home team	Score	Away team
4 June
Paide Linnameeskond III (4)	13–2	JK Mauruse Saurused (RL)
8 June
Tartu FC Helios (5)	5–1	Rumouri Calcio II (RL)
12 June
Tartu JK Tammeka IV (5)	0–4	JK Tallinna Kalev III (4)
13 June
Tallinna FC Zapoos (5)	w/o	Tallinna FC Zenit (5)
FC Mulgi (RL)	0–1	FC Tallinna Wolves (6)
19 June
Viimsi JK II (4)	1–2	Maarjamäe FC Igiliikur (5)
Kohtla-Järve JK Järve II (6)	w/o	JK 32. kk (RL)
Tallinna FC Eston Villa (5)	15–0	JK Metsis (RL)
20 June
Tallinna FC Soccernet (6)	1–3	FC Vastseliina (5)
FC Lelle (6)	2-1	Tallinna FC TransferWise (6)
Märjamaa Kompanii (5)	w/o	FC Sssolutions (RL)
JK Kernu Kadakas (5)	3–1	FC Maksatransport (RL)
21 June
Tallinna JK Piraaja (4)	1–3	Tallinna JK Legion II (4)
26 June
Kohila Püsivus (5)	0–5	JK Pärnu Sadam (RL)
27 June
FC Flora U19 (4)	10–0	Pärnu JK Poseidon II (5)
Jõgeva SK Noorus-96 (4)	2–4 (a.e.t.)	FC Otepää (5)
9 July
Tallinna FC Olympic Olybet (6)	1–9	Paide Linnameeskond (1)
13 July
Maardu Linnameeskond (1)	12–0	Valga FC Warrior (5)
Rakvere JK Tarvas (2)	0–3	Kohtla-Järve JK Järve (2)
Põhja-Sakala (4)	5–2 (a.e.t.)	Pärnu Jalgpalliklubi (3)
JK Narva Trans (1)	w/o	FC Maardu Aliens (5)
Viljandi JK Tulevik (1)	w/o	SK Kadrina (5)
Põhja-Tallinna JK Volta (3)	w/o	Vikings FC (RL)
15 July
Tartu JK Tammeka (1)	8–1	FCI Tallinn (4)
24 July
FC Elva (2)	3–0	EMÜ SK (5)

=== Byes ===
These teams were not drawn and secured a place in the second round without playing:

- Meistriliiga (Level 1): JK Tallinna Kalev, FCI Levadia, FC Flora, FC Kuressaare, Nõmme Kalju FC
- Esiliiga (2): FC Flora U21, Pärnu JK Vaprus, Tartu JK Welco, Tallinna JK Legion
- Esiliiga B (3): Viimsi JK, Võru FC Helios, JK Tabasalu, FC Nõmme United, Keila JK
- II Liiga (4): FC Jõgeva Wolves, Raplamaa JK, Pärnu JK Poseidon, FC Kose, Põhja-Tallinna JK Volta II, Läänemaa JK
- III Liiga (5): Rumori Calcio Tallinn, FC Tarvastu ja JK Tõrva ÜM, JK Loo, Tallinna FC Hell Hunt, FC Äksi Wolves, FC Järva-Jaani, Anija JK
- IV Liiga (6): Kristiine JK, Tallinna JK Jalgpallihaigla, Viimsi Lõvid, Tallinna FC Eston Villa II
- Rahvaliiga (RL): FC Puhkus Mehhikos, Npm Silmet, Rasmus Värki Jalgpallikool, SC ReUnited, FC Elbato, FC Teleios, Team Helm, Kohtla-Nõmme

== Second round (1/32) ==
The draw for the second round was made on 15 July 2019.

Home team	Score	Away team
27 July
FC Tallinna Wolves (6)	5–1	FC Vastseliina (5)
Tallinna JK Jalgpallihaigla (6)	2–7	FC Tarvastu ja JK Tõrva ÜM (5)
FC Kuressaare (1)	12–1	JK Kernu Kadakas (5)
28 July
Põhja-Sakala (4)	5–1	Tartu FC Helios (5)
Team Helm (RL)	3–2	Rumori Calcio Tallinn (5)
Tallinna JK Legion II (4)	9–0	FC Äksi Wolves (5)
29 July
FC Teleios (RL)	2–4	Põhja-Tallinna JK Volta (3)
31 July
Läänemaa JK (4)	1–5	FC Flora U21 (2)
Kohtla-Järve JK Järve (2)	0–1	Võru FC Helios (3)
1 August
JK Loo (5)	0–1	Tallinna FC Eston Villa II (6)
Põhja-Tallinna JK Volta II (4)	6–0	FC Jõgeva Wolves (4)
FC Järva-Jaani (5)	1–10	Tartu JK Welco (2)
2 August
SC ReUnited (RL)	5–1	Pärnu JK Poseidon (4)
6 August
FCI Levadia Tallinn (1)	7–0	Tallinna FC Zenit (5)
Tallinna JK Legion (2)	0–7	JK Narva Trans (1)
Viimsi JK (3)	2–0	Raplamaa JK (4)
Pärnu JK Vaprus (2)	2–3	JK Tallinna Kalev III (4)
FC Nõmme United (3)	1–3	Tartu JK Tammeka (1)
Tallinna FC Hell Hunt (5)	0–1	JK Tallinna Kalev (1)
FC Elbato (RL)	w/o	Maardu Linnameeskond (1)
FC Puhkus Mehhikos (RL)	0–6	Kohtla-Järve JK Järve II (4)
Kristiine JK (6)	0–10	Paide Linnameeskond (1)
7 August
FC Elva (2)	7–0	Viimsi Lõvid (6)
Maarjamäe FC Igiliikur (5)	1–7	Viljandi JK Tulevik (1)
FC Lelle (6)	0–1	JK Tabasalu (3)
Anija JK (5)	2–1	Märjamaa Kompanii (5)
11 August
NPM Silmet (RL)	5–2	FC Flora U19 (4)
12 August
FC Kose (4)	0–5	Paide Linnameeskond III (4)
13 August
JK Pärnu Sadam (RL)	0–0 (a.e.t.) (3–4 p)	FC Otepää (5)
14 August
Rasmus Värki Jalgpallikool (RL)	2–2 (a.e.t.) (5–3 p)	Tallinna FC Eston Villa (5)
20 August
FC Flora (1)	12–0	Kohtla-Nõmme (RL)
21 August
Nõmme Kalju FC (1)	2–0	Keila JK (3)

== Third round (1/16) ==
The draw for the third round was made on 9 August 2019.

Home team	Score	Away team
20 August
FC Tarvastu ja JK Tõrva ÜM (5)	1–4	FC Elva (2)
Põhja-Sakala (4)	0–3	JK Tallinna Kalev (1)
24 August
SC ReUnited (RL)	5–2	NPM Silmet (RL)
27 August
Rasmus Värki Jalgpallikool (RL)	3–0	Anija JK (5)
4 September
Paide Linnameeskond (1)	13–0	Põhja-Tallinna JK Volta (3)
Viljandi JK Tulevik (1)	11–0	FC Tallinna Wolves (6)
Tallinna JK Legion II (4)	0–1	Tartu JK Tammeka (1)
5 September
Põhja-Tallinna JK Volta II (4)	2–0	Viimsi JK (3)
7 September
Võru FC Helios (3)	2–1	Tartu JK Welco (2)
Team Helm (RL)	1–21	FCI Levadia Tallinn (1)
11 September
Kohtla-Järve JK Järve II (4)	0–0 (a.e.t.) (10–9 p)	JK Tallinna Kalev III (4)
25 September
FC Kuressaare (1)	1–3	JK Narva Trans (1)
9 October
Tallinna FC Eston Villa II (6)	3–0	FC Otepää (5)
12 October
Paide Linnameeskond III (4)	0–3 (a.e.t.)	Nõmme Kalju FC (1)
23 October
Maardu Linnameeskond (1)	0–7	FC Flora (1)
29 October
JK Tabasalu (3)	2–1	FC Flora U21 (2)

== Fourth round (1/8) ==
The draw for the fourth round was made on 11 September 2019.

Home team	Score	Away team
25 September
SC ReUnited (RL)	1–2	Kohtla-Järve JK Järve II (4)
13 October
Rasmus Värki Jalgpallikool (RL)	0–1	Võru FC Helios (3)
22 October
JK Narva Trans (1)	21–0	Tallinna FC Eston Villa II (6)
23 October
JK Tallinna Kalev (1)	7–0	Põhja Tallinna JK Volta II (4)
FCI Levadia Tallinn (1)	1–2	Nõmme Kalju FC (1)
30 October
Paide Linnameeskond (1)	1–3	FC Flora (1)
Viljandi JK Tulevik (1)	0–1	Tartu JK Tammeka (1)
6 November
FC Elva (2)	2–0	JK Tabasalu (3)

== Quarter-finals ==
The draw for the fourth round was made on 29 February 2020.

10 March 2020	Nõmme Kalju FC (1)	1–2	JK Narva Trans (1)	Tallinn
19:00 (UTC+3)	Puri 51'	Report	Irie 59'; Zakarliuka 76'	Stadium: Hiiu Stadium; Referee: Juri Frischer

10 March 2020	FC Elva (2)	3–1	Kohtla-Järve JK Järve U21 (4)	Elva
19:00 (UTC+3)	Kolesnitšenko 25'; Maidla 81'; Orehhov 90+3' (o.g.)	Report	Salmus 88'	Stadium: Nike Arena Elva; Referee: Elar Tarkus

11 March 2020	Võru FC Helios (3)	0–6	JK Tallinna Kalev (1)	Võru
19:00 (UTC+3)		Report	Vaherna 31'; Golovljov 37', 53', 59'; Anier 57'; El Aabchi 79'	Stadium: Võru Jalgpallikeskus; Referee: Siim Rinken

11 March 2020	Tartu JK Tammeka (1)	0–3	FC Flora (1)	Tartu
19:00 (UTC+3)		Report	Soomets 16'; Miller 29'; Alliku 87'	Stadium: Sepa Staadion; Referee: Kristo Tohver

== Semi-finals ==
20 June 2020	FC Elva (2)	2–4	FC Flora (1)	Elva
13:00 (UTC+3)	Maidla 11'; Thomson 56' (pen.)	Report	Välja 28'; Lepik 60'; Alliku 81'; Miller 84'	Stadium: Nike Arena Elva

20 June 2020	JK Narva Trans (1)	4–1	JK Tallinna Kalev (1)	Narva
19:00 (UTC+3)	Nesterovski 3'; Sobtšenko 49'; Chinedu 51', 84'	Report	Teeväli 64'	Stadium: Narva Kreenholm Stadium

== Final ==
4 July 2020	FC Flora (1)	2–1	JK Narva Trans (1)	Tallinn
16:00 (UTC+3)	Vassiljev 18'; Pürg 73'	Report	Tounkara 28'	Stadium: A. Le Coq Arena; Referee: Joonas Jaanovits
