= 2011–12 Estonian Cup =

Estonian football competition

Tournament details
- Country: Estonia
- Teams: 90

Final positions
- Champions: Levadia
- Runners-up: Narva Trans

Tournament statistics
- Matches played: 86
- Goals scored: 513 (5.97 per match)

The 2011–12 Estonian Cup is the twenty-second season of the Estonian football knockout tournament organized by the Estonian Football Association. The winner qualified for the first qualifying round of the 2012–13 UEFA Europa League.

== First round ==
The draw was made by Estonian Football Association on 15 June.

Team 1	Score	Team 2
6 July
Olympic	6–1	Kiiu
9 July
Kaitseliit Kalev	1–7	Viljandi
12 July
Ararat TTÜ	3–1	Tulevik
Tabasalu	9–1	Twister
19 July
HaServ	2–4	Trans
Kalju	14–0	Kalju III
Noorus	1–1 (a.e.t.) (5–4 p)	Saue Laagri
Kalev Juunior	1–4	Järva-Jaani
Toompea 1994	1–12	Orbiit
Maardu	w/o	Kose
Akhtamar	4–2	Warrior II
Welco Elekter	1–0	Kalev III
20 July
Igiliikur	1–2	Tapa
Reaal	1–9	Pärnu LM
Warrior	1–5	Tammeka II
Infonet	8–0	Haiba
aameraaS	2–10	Kalev
Nõmme Utd	1–3	Keila
Rada	2–1	Tabivere
Elva	1–x^{1}	Luunja
Lelle	2–1	Emmaste
26 July
Lasnamäe Ajax	0–6	Kuressaare
Joker 1993	5–0	Otepää II
27 July
Jalgpallihaigla	0–17	Flora
Levadia	8–0	Lootus
31 July
EMÜ	1–9	Otepää

^{1} Luunja used an ineligible player, the original score was 1–0, but was awarded to Elva as 1–x.

== Second round ==
The draw was made on 21 July.

Team 1	Score	Team 2
2 August
Paide LM	8–0	Tabsalu II
Rada	0–3	Viljandi
Joker 1993	3–0	Olympic
Levadia	1–1 (a.e.t.) (5–4 p)	Kalju
3 August
Kärdla LM	1–3	Puuma
Flora II	3–0	Premium
Suema	2–3	Ararat-TTÜ
Võru	5–0	Mercury
Kalju II	10–1	Kaitseliit Kalev II
Saaremaa JK	w/o	Saku Sporting
Maardu	4–0	Atli
Visadus	0–2	Navi
Sillamäe Kalev	6–0	Tammeka II
Orbiit	9–1	Aspen
Tapa	0–8	Tallinna Kalev
Kiviõli	8–1	Tääksi
Quattromed	0–5	Pärnu LM
Trans	7–0	Legion
Kuressaare	7–0	Ambla
Pokkeriprod	0–24	Tammeka
Welco Elekter	5–2	Loo
Flora	13–0	Lelle
4 August
Soccernet	4–3	Akhtamar
10 August
Tallinna Ülikool	2–3	Ganvix
Elva	3–3 (a.e.t.) (3–0 p)	Noorus-96
Kristiine	0–9	Infonet
Lootos	6–1	Järva-Jaani
11 August
Kumake	1–0	Sörve
Leisi	2–2 (a.e.t.) (5–4 p)	Piraaja
Tarvas	5–0	Eston Villa
16 August
Keila	w/o	Tabasalu
17 August
Otepää	3–0	Metropool

== Third round ==
The draw was made on 4 August.

Team 1	Score	Team 2
30 August
Orbiit	0–3	Viljandi
31 August
Kiviõli	1–3	Paide LM
Pärnu LM	13–0	Soccernet
Sillamäe	8–0	Võru
Trans	9–0	Navi
Kuressaare	2–1	Welco Elekter
Elva	1–2	Maardu
Kalju II	4–4 (a.e.t.) (3–4 p)	Lootos
7 September
Flora II	2–1	Ararat-TTÜ
Kumake	3–2	Ganvix
Leisi	0–1	Saaremaa JK
Puuma	1–4	Flora
Levadia	5–0	Infonet
Joker 1993	1–4	Tammeka
14 September
Keila	2–5	Tarvas
5 October
Otepää	0–7	Kalev

== Fourth round ==
The draw was made on 6 September.

Team 1	Score	Team 2
21 September
Kumake	0–1	Flora II
4 October
Viljandi	2–1 (a.e.t.)	Tarvas
5 October
Lootos	0–9	Flora
8 October
Trans	6–0	Maardu
9 October
Saaremaa JK	1–4	Pärnu LM
1 November
Paide LM	3−3 (a.e.t.) (7–6 p)	Sillamäe
Tammeka	7−0	Kuressaare
2 November
Levadia	4−1	Kalev

== Quarter-finals ==
The draw was made on 8 March 2012, at the opening of new league season. The matches will be played on 24–25 April.

24 April 2012	Narva Trans	2−1	Tammeka	Narva
18:00 UTC+3	Kazakov 13'; Leontovitš 71'	Report	43' (o.g.) Ekobena	Stadium: Narva Kreenholmi Stadium; Attendance: 53; Referee: Toomas Nõmmiste

24 April 2012	Flora	3−0	Viljandi	Tallinn
18:45 UTC+3	Minkenen 64'; Mashichev 75'; Beglarishvili 84'	Report		Stadium: A. Le Coq Arena; Attendance: 182; Referee: Jaan Roos

25 April 2012	Paide	4−0	Pärnu	Paide
18:00 UTC+3	Tikenberg 5'; Nõmme 30'; Kald 50'; Kõll 63'	Report		Stadium: Paide linnastaadion Attendance: 145; Referee: Juri Frischer

25 April 2012	Flora U21	0−2	Levadia	Tallinn
18:00 UTC+3		Report	15' Toomet; 68' Hunt	Stadium: Sportland Arena; Attendance: 168; Referee: Roomer Tarajev

== Semi-finals ==
The draw for semi-finals was held on 26 April 2012.

8 May 2012	Paide	0–1	Narva Trans	Paide
18:45 UTC+3		Report	16' Borisovs	Stadium: Paide linnastaadion Attendance: 188; Referee: Kristo Tohver

8 May 2012	Levadia	0–0 (a.e.t.) (5–4 p)	Flora	Tallinn
18:45 UTC+3		Report		Stadium: Maarjamäe staadion Attendance: 355
	Penalties
	Morozov (penalty scored); Subbotin (penalty scored); Kaljumäe (penalty scored); Toomet (penalty scored); Artjunin (penalty scored)		(penalty scored) Frolov; (penalty missed) Minkenen; (penalty scored) Luts; (penalty scored) Mashichev; (penalty scored) Luigend

== Final ==
The final will be held on 26 May 2012 at A. Le Coq Arena.

26 May 2012	Narva Trans	0–3	Levadia	Tallinn
17:00 UTC+3		Report	40' Podholjuzin; 65' Artjunin; 81' Morozov	Stadium: A. Le Coq Arena; Attendance: 3,007; Referee: Roomer Tarajev
