= Harju JK Laagri =

Association football club in Estonia

Harju
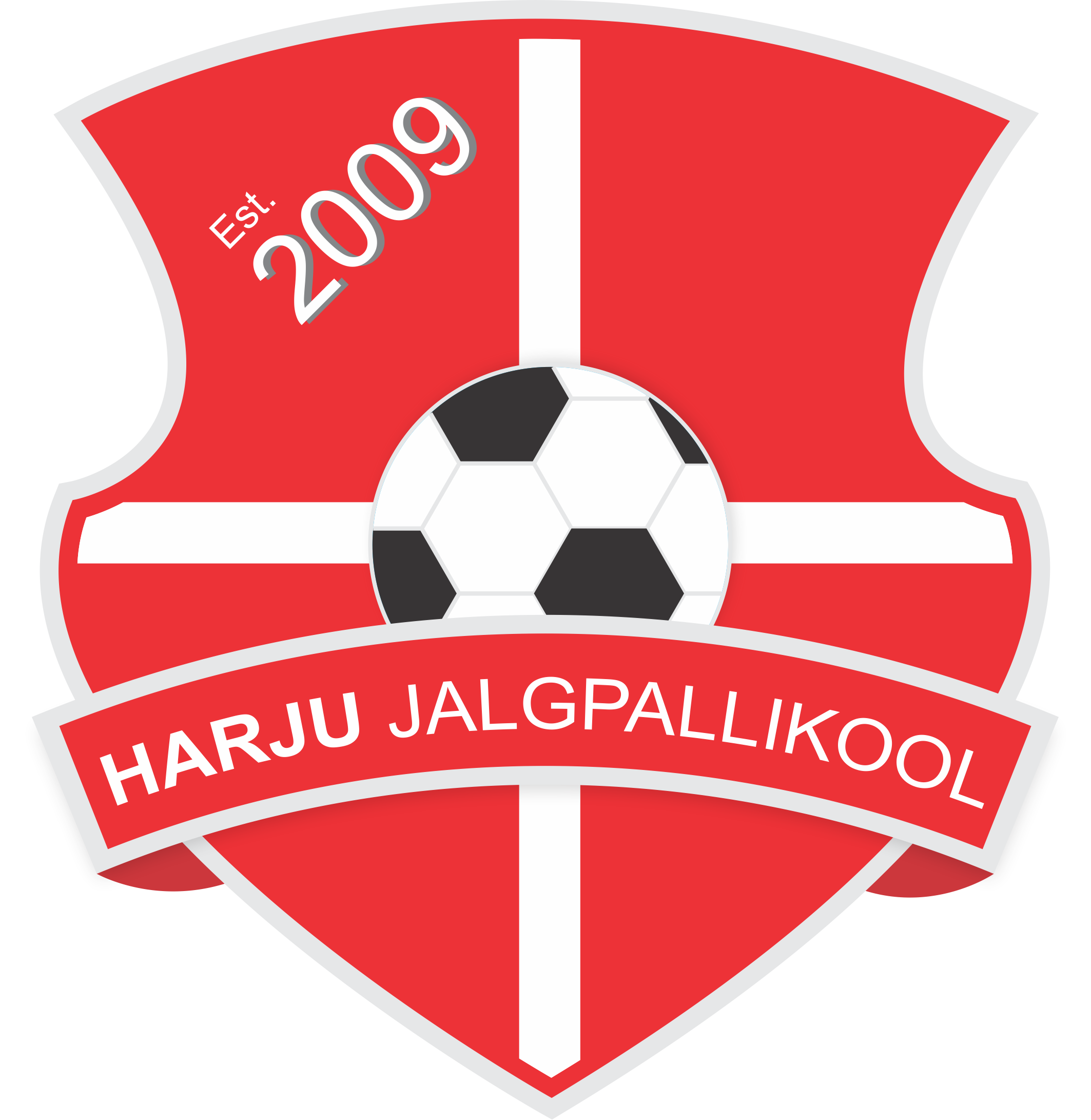
- Full name: Harju Jalgpallikool Laagri
- Founded: 27 August 2009; 17 years ago
- Ground: Laagri kunstmurustaadion
- Capacity: 500
- Chairman: Kalmar Liiv
- Manager: Lauri Nuuma
- League: Meistriliiga
- 2026: Meistriliiga, 6th of 10
- Website: https://harjujk.ee/
Home colours	Away colours

Harju Jalgpallikool Laagri, commonly known as Harju JK, or simply as Harju, is an Estonian professional football club based in Laagri, Harjumaa. Founded in 2009, the club competes in the Meistriliiga, the top flight of Estonian football.

Harju entered senior football in 2015, debuted in Meistriliiga in 2023 and competes in the top flight again since 2025.

== History ==
Harju Jalgpallikool was founded on 27 August 2009 with the aim of focusing on youth football and developing players for the Estonian national youth teams and foreign academies. Harju JK entered senior football in 2015, when their first team entered IV Liiga, the lowest division in Estonian football.

In 2019, Harju JK appointed Portuguese Victor da Silva as their manager and in the following seasons gained promotion four consecutive seasons. During the period, Harju's team consisted mostly of their youth system players, which resulted in youth prospects Karel Mustmaa signing a three-year professional contract with Benfica and Imre Kartau moving to Venezia F.C. Harju JK won Esiliiga in the 2022 season and were promoted to Estonian top flight Premium Liiga for the first time in its history. Despite a number of strong performances, the club finished the 2023 season in last place with 23 points and were relegated back to Esiliiga. Harju won promotion back to top flight at their first attempt as the 2024 Esiliiga champions and finished the 2025 Meistriliiga season in 7th place with 36 points. During the season, Karel Eerme became the first player from Harju to be called up to the Estonia senior national team. The club improved their position in the following 2026 season, finishing in 6th place with 47 points.

== Stadium ==
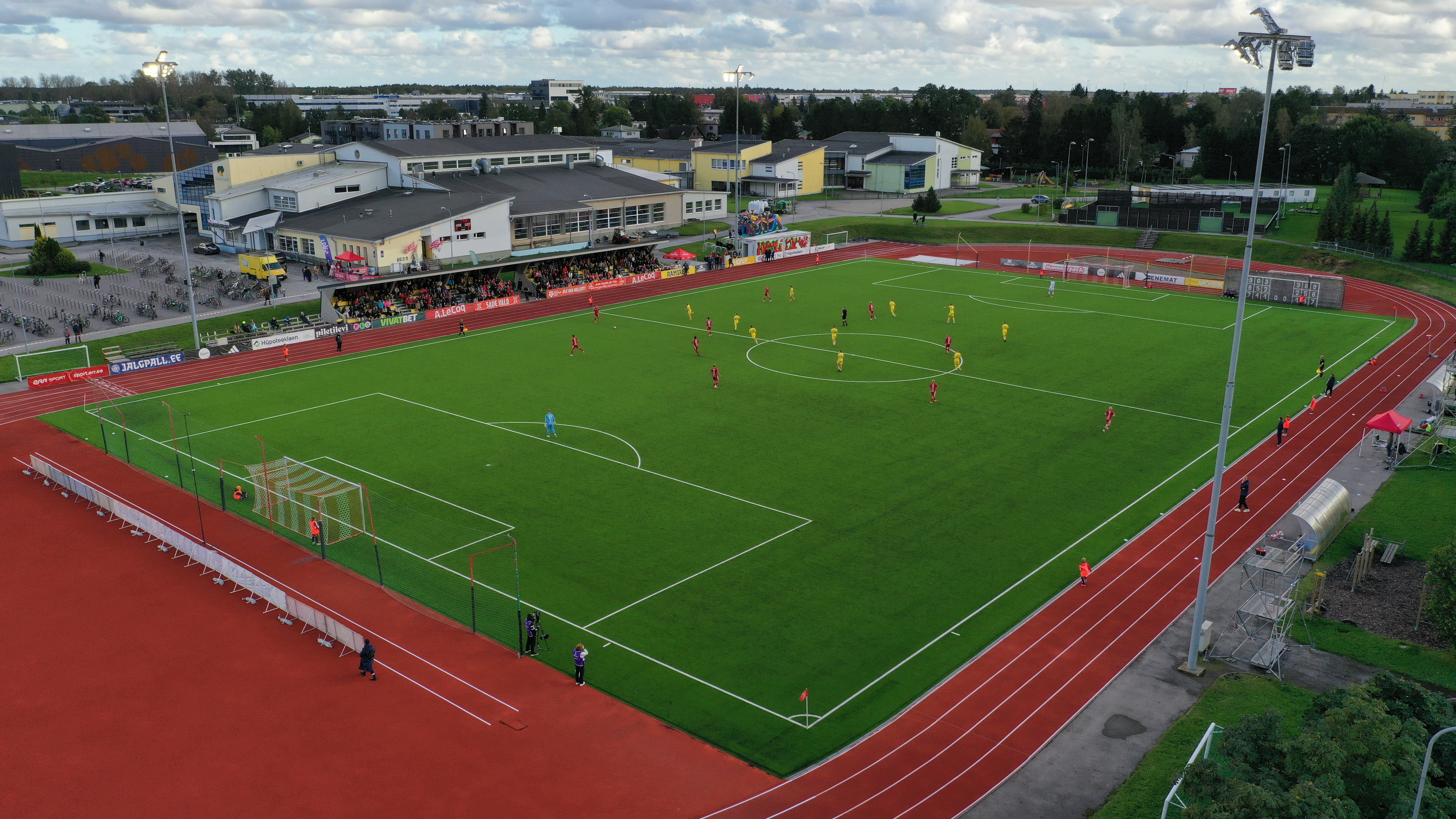
Laagri Stadium hosting Harju's Premium Liiga match in 2025

Laagri Stadium has been the home ground of Harju JK since the club's establishment. The multi-purpose stadium is located just 200 metres from the border of capital city Tallinn. The stadium was renovated in 2025, as new artificial turf surface was installed and a 500-capacity wooden stand was constructed.

== Players ==
=== First-team squad ===
As of 21 August 2026

Note: Flags indicate national team as defined under FIFA eligibility rules; some limited exceptions apply. Players may hold more than one non-FIFA nationality.

No.	Pos.	Nation	Player
1	GK	EST	Jan Martti Vainula
3	DF	EST	Andreas Kaevats
4	DF	EST	Andres Järve (captain)
5	MF	EST	Imre Kartau
6	MF	EST	Hugo Palutaja
7	MF	EST	Reinhard Reimaa
9	FW	EST	Karel Eerme
10	FW	CIV	Yann Emmanuel Assale
11	FW	EST	Ander-Joosep Kose
15	DF	EST	Sander Alex Liit
16	FW	EST	Kristjan Kriis
17	MF	EST	Marten Henrik Kelement
18	DF	CAN	Idrissa Bah
19	FW	CAN	Abdul Binate
20	DF	EST	Andreas Vaher

No.	Pos.	Nation	Player
21	MF	EST	Sander Soo
22	DF	EST	Markus Kesa
23	MF	UKR	Danyil Rudenko
24	DF	EST	Kaspar Laur
32	MF	EST	Stevin Kerge
36	DF	EST	Sander Salei
41	DF	EST	Enriko Kajari
45	FW	EST	Steven Kangur
47	FW	EST	Karl-Erik Ennuste
53	FW	CAN	Joseph Ndakala
65	MF	EST	Kaspar Rõõmussaar
79	GK	EST	Rihard Meesit
88	DF	SEN	Moussa Seck (on loan from Zulte Waregem)
89	GK	EST	Harly Ollin
95	DF	EST	Sigvard Suppi

=== Out on loan ===
Note: Flags indicate national team as defined under FIFA eligibility rules; some limited exceptions apply. Players may hold more than one non-FIFA nationality.

No.	Pos.	Nation	Player
10	MF	EST	Ander Sikk (at Tallinna Kalev until 31 December 2026)
13	FW	EST	Ramol Sillamaa (at Jönköpings Södra IF until 31 December 2026)

== Personnel ==
=== Current technical staff ===
Position	Name
Manager	(Estonia) Lauri Nuuma
Assistant coaches	(Estonia) Jaanus Reitel
Assistant coaches	(Estonia) Erik Listmann
Goalkeeping coach	(Estonia) Sten-Marten Vahi
Fitness specialist	(Estonia) Janar Säkk
Physiotherapist	(Estonia) Margret Help
Management
Chief Executive Officer	(Estonia) Kalmar Liiv
Head of Youth	(Estonia) Indrek Nuuma

=== Managerial history ===
Dates	Name
2017–2018	(Portugal) José da Paz
2019–2024	(Portugal) Victor da Silva
2025–	(Estonia) Lauri Nuuma

== Honours ==
=== League ===
- Esiliiga
  - Winners (2): 2022, 2024

== Statistics ==
=== League and Cup ===
Season	Division	Pos	Pld	W	D	L	GF	GA	GD	Pts	Top goalscorer	Cup
2015	IV liiga E	5	21	11	0	10	52	43	+9	33	(Estonia) Kalmar Liiv (13)	
2016	III liiga E	7	22	10	3	9	71	58	+13	33	(Estonia) Ken-Glaid Nool (10)	First round
2017	III liiga N	8	22	7	6	9	53	51	+2	27	(Estonia) Ken-Glaid Nool (26)	
2018	III liiga N	3	22	13	2	7	55	42	+13	41	(Estonia) Ken-Glaid Nool (25)	
2019	III liiga N	1	22	18	0	4	60	23	+37	54	(Estonia) Ken-Glaid Nool (Estonia) Erik Listmann (16)	
2020	II liiga S/W	2	26	19	2	5	105	41	+64	59	(Estonia) Ken-Glaid Nool (35)	
2021	Esiliiga B	2	32	20	3	9	88	49	+39	63	(Estonia) Andre Järva (27)	
2022	Esiliiga	1	36	24	4	8	97	46	+51	76	(Estonia) Andre Järva (20)	
2023	Meistriliiga	10	36	5	8	23	27	61	–34	23	(Ukraine) Daniil Rudenko (Estonia) Kaarel Usta (5)	Fourth round
2024	Esiliiga	1	36	22	12	2	110	42	+68	78	(Estonia) Karel Eerme (28)	Fourth round
2025	Meistriliiga	7	36	10	6	20	49	70	–21	36	(Estonia) Karel Eerme (13)	Fourth round
2026	Meistriliiga	6	36	15	2	19	51	55	–4	47	(Estonia) Karel Eerme (10)	Fourth round
