= Lihula JK =

Estonian football club

- Full name: Lihula Jalgpalliklubi
- Founded: 2009
- Ground: Lihula kooli staadion
- Manager: Argo Mõtt
- League: III Liiga
- 2018: III Liiga West, 11th
Home colours	Away colours

Lihula JK is an Estonian football club based in Lihula. Founded in 2009, they currently play in the III Liiga, the fifth tier of Estonian football.

== Players ==
=== Current squad ===
As of 16 June 2017.

Note: Flags indicate national team as defined under FIFA eligibility rules; some limited exceptions apply. Players may hold more than one non-FIFA nationality.

No.	Pos.	Nation	Player
2	DF	EST	Rivo Oosim
3	DF	EST	Rasmus Paulus
4	MF	EST	Randel Plaas
5	DF	EST	Kaarel Pikkmets
6	MF	EST	Argo Mõtt
7	MF	EST	Janar Smõtškov
8	MF	EST	Egert Kallaste
9	MF	EST	Reigo Vänt
10	FW	EST	Madis Sibul

No.	Pos.	Nation	Player
11	FW	EST	Romel Puda
13	MF	EST	Uku Ehasalu
14	FW	EST	Reilo Mark
17	MF	EST	Reno Mark
18	MF	EST	Mirko Kruus
19	DF	EST	Horre Kruus
20	MF	EST	Sander Kruus
21	DF	EST	Kristjan Kadakas
22	MF	EST	Oliver Raudnagel

== Statistics ==
=== League and Cup ===
Season	Division	Pos	Teams	Pld	W	D	L	GF	GA	GD	Pts	Top Goalscorer	Estonian Cup	Notes
2009	IV Liiga W	10	12	22	6	3	13	48	69	−21	21	Mairo Kanter (20)		as Lõuna-Läänemaa JK
2010	IV Liiga W	6	12	22	12	3	7	68	42	+26	39	Mairo Kanter and Madis Sibul (14)		as Lihula JK
2011	IV Liiga W	5	11	20	8	5	7	49	37	+12	29	Madis Sibul (14)		as Lihula JK
2012	IV Liiga W	4	12	22	13	2	7	69	40	+29	33	Madis Sibul (17)	First Round	as Lihula JK
2013	III Liiga W	8	12	22	8	4	10	49	63	−14	28	Mairo Kanter (17)	Second Round	as Lihula JK
2014	III Liiga W	7	12	22	8	6	8	41	45	−4	30	Madis Sibul (11)		as Lihula JK
2015	III Liiga W	5	12	22	11	4	7	44	35	+9	37	Mairo Kanter (9)		as Lihula JK
2016	III Liiga W	7	12	22	7	5	10	46	48	−2	26	Madis Sibul (16)		as Lihula JK
2017	III Liiga W	4	12	22	12	5	5	51	38	+13	41	Madis Sibul (13)	Second Round	as Lihula JK
2018	III Liiga W	11	12	22	4	4	14	37	70	−33	16	Reilo Mark (9)	-	as Lihula JK
