= Tallinna JK Augur =

Estonian football club

- Founded: 2012
- Ground: Keila Stadium
- Manager: Tõnu Janter
- 2020: IV Liiga C level, 8th
Home colours	Away colours

Tallinna JK Augur is an Estonian football club based in Keila. Founded in 2012, they currently play in the III Liiga, the fifth tier of Estonian football.

== Players ==
=== Current squad ===
As of 31 July 2018.

Note: Flags indicate national team as defined under FIFA eligibility rules; some limited exceptions apply. Players may hold more than one non-FIFA nationality.

No.	Pos.	Nation	Player
1	GK	(Estonia) EST	Andrei Grigorjev
4	DF	(Estonia) EST	Karl-Kristjan Kivisto
5	DF	(Estonia) EST	Erkki Viisma
6	MF	(Estonia) EST	Tomi Linde
7	FW	(Estonia) EST	Rauno Kütt
8	DF	(Estonia) EST	Markko Ladvas
9	MF	(Estonia) EST	Robin Sööt
10	FW	(Estonia) EST	Mait Uusmäe
11	MF	(Estonia) EST	Jasper Janter
12	DF	(Estonia) EST	Marek Pello
14	DF	(Estonia) EST	Hendrik Ekke Altnurme
15	MF	(Estonia) EST	Joonas Meister
16	MF	(Estonia) EST	Rene Aadusoo

No.	Pos.	Nation	Player
17	MF	(Estonia) EST	Tanel Kanne
18	FW	(Estonia) EST	Eduard Uratšov
19	DF	(Estonia) EST	Marcus Kukkonen
24	GK	(Estonia) EST	Caspar Janter
46	DF	(Estonia) EST	Tõnu Janter
64	DF	(Estonia) EST	Elari Maranik
66	FW	(Estonia) EST	Martin Kargin
71	DF	(Estonia) EST	Dmitri Karpov
77	FW	(Estonia) EST	Dmitri Papušin
81	FW	(Estonia) EST	Antti Järva
82	FW	(Estonia) EST	Maksim Rozgonjuk
88	DF	(Estonia) EST	Martin Martsepp
99	MF	(Estonia) EST	Lauri Kurel

== Statistics ==
=== League and Cup ===
Season	Division	Pos	Teams	Pld	W	D	L	GF	GA	GD	Pts	Top Goalscorer	Estonian Cup
2015	IV liiga E	7	8	21	5	2	14	20	79	−59	17	Ludvig Tasane (5)	-
2016	IV liiga N/W	5	10	18	7	3	8	38	39	−1	24	Ruslan Kolesnikov (9)	-
2017	III liiga E	10	12	22	5	1	16	29	86	−57	32	Mait Uusmäe (8)	-
