= Põhja-Sakala (football club) =

Estonian sports club

- Full name: Põhja-Sakala
- Founded: 27 January 2011
- Ground: Suure-Jaani gümnaasiumi staadion (Lembitu avenue 42, Suure-Jaan)
- Capacity: 250
- Manager: Indrek Jegorov
- League: II Liiga
- 2018: III liiga, 1st
Home colours	Away colours

Suure-Jaani United is an Estonian football club sports club based in Suure-Jaani. The club was formed from the club JK Rolling Doors in 2011. The club plays in III Liiga. In 2012 Estonian Cup the club reached to the 1/16 finals, losing to a II Liiga club FC Elva at home 1–2. In 2018 the team decided to start cooperating with a nearby club called SK Tääksi and the two started playing under the name Põhja-Sakala. Newly formed team decided to play their home games on the Suure-Jaani Gymnasium's stadion. Põhja-Sakala also instantly formed a second team named Põhja-Sakala II, which currently plays in the sixth tier. The team won the III liiga in 2018 and got promoted to the II liiga.

== History ==
=== Beginning (2011 – today) ===
Suure-Jaani United is a sports club established on 27 January 2011. Many of the players came from earlier club JK Rolling Doors, which previously ended. After many players wanted to play football in Suure-Jaani, local coach Sergei Vassiljev, who was training the same players in JK Rolling Doors, decided to create his own club: SK Suure-Jaani United. This is the reserve team of Türi Ganvix JK.

=== First season ===
SK Suure-Jaani United started the first season at 2011 in the VI Liiga. VI Liiga is the fifth football league in Estonia and also the lowest. Surprisingly Suure-Jaani started to lead the league straight away and was in the top of the league over half the season. Leading must have made them sleepy, because United lost one of the last game in the season to Tõrva Warrior 3:0, and they fell into second place, where they finished the season. The season was won by Tartu Quattromed by 33 points, second was SK Suure-Jaani United with 31 points, and third was the close neighbour SK Tääksi with 30 points.

=== Second season ===
By the second season SK Suure-Jaani United had risen to III Liiga. The men knew, that none of the points came easy. After half of the season things didn't look so good. Only 1 point had come from SK Tääksi, who had also risen to III Liiga, and many games were lost in the final minutes. Games looked bright until last 15 minutes when goals were let in. The first three games were lost on the second half of the season and it all went downhill faster. Then United won two games in a row, amazingly in one game 11–1. At the end of the season, United won 4 games and had one draw. It meant 13 points and the (11th) second to last position, which meant that the same league continues in the next season.

== Players ==
=== First-team squad ===
As of 24 August 2013.

Note: Flags indicate national team as defined under FIFA eligibility rules; some limited exceptions apply. Players may hold more than one non-FIFA nationality.

No.	Pos.	Nation	Player
—	DF	(Estonia) EST	Kristjan Endrekson
12		(Estonia) EST	Freddy Freiberg
39	DF	(Lithuania) LTU	Aleksander Golovko
9	MF	(Estonia) EST	Kaido Heinsalu
8		(Estonia) EST	Sander Hiiemäe
15		(Estonia) EST	Kristo Jaansoo
15	DF	(Estonia) EST	Reino Jaeski
1	GK	(Estonia) EST	Allar Joandi
10		(Estonia) EST	Raigo Koodres
6		(Estonia) EST	Johannes Kruusma
—	MF	(Estonia) EST	Vaapo Kuhi
14	MF	(Estonia) EST	Margo Lepik
26		(Estonia) EST	Arnold Merendi
23	DF	(Estonia) EST	Märt Mäger
21	FW	(Estonia) EST	Madis Puskar

No.	Pos.	Nation	Player
—	MF	(Estonia) EST	Siim Päeva
10		(Estonia) EST	Reiko Rosenberg
9		(Estonia) EST	Villu Sepp
33	DF	(Estonia) EST	Marek Siimon
26		(Estonia) EST	Samuel Taat
18	MF	(Estonia) EST	Sergei Teppan
7	FW	(Estonia) EST	Margus Terras
22	MF	(Estonia) EST	Ats Toomsalu
4	DF	(Estonia) EST	Ott Toomsalu
3		(Estonia) EST	Tanel Toomsalu
—	DF	(Estonia) EST	Taavi Umal
2		(Estonia) EST	Markel Utsal
33	MF	(Estonia) EST	Sergei Vassiljev
8	DF	(Estonia) EST	Einar Vendelin
17		(Estonia) EST	Oliver Vorobjov

== Statistics ==
=== League and Cup ===
Season	Division	Pos	Pld	W	D	L	GF	GA	GD	Pts	Avg. Att.	Top goalscorer	Cup
2018	III liiga S	1	22	15	1	6	72	44	+28	46	33	(Estonia) Kaido Kaljula (20)	First round
2019	II liiga S/W	6	26	12	2	12	51	56	-5	38	28	(Estonia) Riho Domberg (23)	Third round
