= FC Warrior Valga =

Estonian football club

Valga FC Warrior
- Full name: FC Valga Warrior
- Founded: 1990; 35 years ago
- Ground: Valga Kungla kunstmurustaadion
- Manager: (Estonia) Meelis Kuivits
- League: III liiga South
- 2022: III liiga South, 6th
Home colours	Away colours

FC Valga Warrior is an Estonian football club based in Valga.

The club joined with FC Valga at the end of 2005 and got their place in Meistriliiga.

They finished 8th in the Esiliiga in 2010 accumulating 35 points in 36 games. After promotion/relegation play-offs they lost to Tallinna FC Atletik, and were relegated to II E/N, third level of Estonian club football.

== Statistics ==
=== League and Cup ===
Season	Division	Pos	Pld	W	D	L	GF	GA	GD	Pts	Top goalscorer	Cup	Notes
1992	II liiga	4	6	0	0	6	7	20	−13	0	?	–	as Valga FC Warrior
1992–93	II liiga	3	6	1	0	5	4	17	−13	2	?	–	as Valga Fööniks-Sport
1993–94	Esiliiga	11	20	0	0	20	8	127	−119	0	?	–	as Valga Fööniks-Sport
1994–95	II liiga	5	8	1	2	5	19	32	−13	5	?	–	as Valga FC Warrior
1995–96	III liiga	2	8	6	1	1	24	12	+12	19	?	–	as Valga FC Warrior
1997–98	IV liiga	1	6	4	1	1	27	9	+18	13	Kristjan Rõivassepp and Nikolai Vähi (15)	–	as Valga FC Warrior
1998	II liiga	5	10	4	0	6	28	34	−6	12	Andrei Belov (7)	–	as Valga FC Warrior
1999	III liiga	6	20	3	3	14	29	73	−46	15	Mareks Cibulskis (11)	–	as Valga FC Warrior
2000	IV liiga	5	20	6	3	11	43	51	−8	21	Aleksandr Morozov (20)	–	as Valga FC Warrior
2001	IV liiga	3	20	13	1	6	69	37	+32	40	Aleksandr Morozov (20)	–	as Valga FC Warrior
2002	IV liiga	6	18	8	2	8	39	38	+1	26	Ivo Malm (13)	–	as Valga FC Warrior
2003	IV liiga	3	18	12	2	4	59	14	+45	38	Ivo Malm (19)	–	as Valga FC Warrior
2004	III liiga	2	18	11	5	2	51	28	+23	38	Dmitri Babkin (12)	–	as Valga FC Warrior
2005	II liiga	5	28	12	2	14	42	58	−16	38	Mareks Cibulskis (8)	?	as Valga FC Warrior
2006	Meistriliiga	10	36	3	2	31	16	110	−94	11	Ken Kallaste (4)	First round	as Valga FC Warrior
2007	Esiliiga	7	36	13	5	18	72	73	−1	44	Henri Anier (13)	Third round	as Valga FC Warrior
2008	Esiliiga	5	36	13	9	14	46	56	−10	48	Meelis Peitre (9)	Third round	as Valga FC Warrior
2009	Esiliiga	3	36	21	2	13	68	63	+5	65	Sander Rõivassepp (18)	Quarter-Final	as Valga FC Warrior
2010	Esiliiga	8	36	10	6	20	57	90	−33	36	Raiko Karpov (12)	Second round	as Valga FC Warrior
2011	Esiliiga	10	36	3	7	26	34	131	−97	16	Sander Lepik (8)	First round	as Valga FC Warrior
2012	III liiga	12	22	3	2	17	52	108	−56	11	Marek Naal (25)	Second round	as Valga FC Warrior
2013	III liiga	10	22	7	1	14	48	73	−25	22	Roman Raevski (14)	First round	as Valga FC Warrior
2014	III liiga	9	22	8	1	13	37	61	−24	25	Roman Raevski (14)	Second round	as Valga FC Warrior
2015	III liiga	11	22	5	1	16	34	74	−40	16	Vladislav Jakovlev (5)	First round	as Valga FC Warrior
2016	III liiga	12	22	2	1	19	27	107	−80	7	Taavi Laul and Mark Ivanov (5)	First round	as Valga FC Warrior
2017	IV liiga	1	16	15	0	1	64	24	+40	45	Mark Ivanov (23)	Second round	as Valga FC Warrior
2018	III liiga	7	22	9	2	11	60	72	−12	29	Mark Ivanov (16)	Third round	as Valga FC Warrior
2019	III liiga	4	22	13	4	5	74	43	+31	43	Marek Naal (26)	First round	as Valga FC Warrior
