= Ambla Vallameeskond =

Estonian football club

- Founded: 2010
- Ground: Ambla Koolistaadion
- Manager: Kalmer Klettenberg
- League: III Liiga
- 2018: III Liiga East, 11th
| Home colours | Away colours |

Ambla Vallameeskond is an Estonian football club based in Ambla. Founded in 2010, they currently play in the III Liiga, the fifth tier of Estonian football. Ambla Vallameeskond is the reserve team of Estonian football club Rakvere JK Tarvas and it has a reserve team Rakvere JK Tarvas II.

== Players ==
=== Current squad ===
As of 17 June 2017.

Note: Flags indicate national team as defined under FIFA eligibility rules; some limited exceptions apply. Players may hold more than one non-FIFA nationality.

| No. | Pos. | Nation | Player |
|---|---|---|---|
| 4 | DF | (Estonia) EST | Dmitrii Baikov |
| 5 | MF | (Estonia) EST | Andre Tuul |
| 6 | MF | (Estonia) EST | Rauno Tikko |
| 7 | DF | (Estonia) EST | Margus Porkveli |
| 8 | FW | (Estonia) EST | Taavi Neier |
| 9 | MF | (Estonia) EST | Elari Jõendi |
| 11 | MF | (Estonia) EST | Urmo Kuningas |
| 12 | MF | (Estonia) EST | Aigar Lumiste |
| 14 | MF | (Estonia) EST | Andrei Frolov |
| 15 | MF | (Estonia) EST | Dmitri Polištšuk |
| 17 | MF | (Estonia) EST | Peeter Siak |
| 19 | DF | (Estonia) EST | Germo Sivard |

| No. | Pos. | Nation | Player |
|---|---|---|---|
| 20 | MF | (Estonia) EST | Mihkel Part |
| 21 | FW | (Estonia) EST | Aron Kütismaa |
| 22 | MF | (Estonia) EST | Rauno Valk |
| 24 | MF | (Estonia) EST | Mehis Vahero |
| 25 | DF | (Estonia) EST | Martin Bastig |
| 27 | MF | (Estonia) EST | Jörgen Vikat |
| 40 | MF | (Estonia) EST | John-Eric Juht |
| 50 | FW | (Estonia) EST | Raido Laidam |
| 80 | DF | (Estonia) EST | Jürgen Hartšenko |
| 90 | MF | (Estonia) EST | Alar Heinsaar |
| — | MF | (Estonia) EST | Alari Tovstik |
| — | MF | (Estonia) EST | Eero Varendi |

== Statistics ==
=== League and Cup ===
| Season | Division | Pos | Teams | Pld | W | D | L | GF | GA | GD | Pts | Top Goalscorer | Estonian Cup |
|---|---|---|---|---|---|---|---|---|---|---|---|---|---|
| 2010 | IV liiga E | 12 | 12 | 22 | 5 | 1 | 16 | 42 | 69 | −27 | 16 | Elari Jõendi (16) | |
| 2011 | IV liiga E | 7 | 12 | 22 | 10 | 3 | 9 | 50 | 48 | +2 | 33 | Margus Porkveli (8) | |
| 2012 | IV liiga E | 3 | 12 | 22 | 14 | 3 | 5 | 85 | 35 | +50 | 45 | Urmas Raaper (29) | First round |
| 2013 | III liiga E | 6 | 12 | 22 | 10 | 1 | 11 | 45 | 65 | −20 | 31 | Volodja Erdei (15) | Second round |
| 2014 | III liiga E | 11 | 12 | 22 | 3 | 0 | 19 | 24 | 97 | −73 | 9 | Margus Porkveli (4) | Second round |
| 2015 | III liiga E | 11 | 12 | 22 | 5 | 2 | 15 | 31 | 92 | −61 | 17 | Rando Duder (13) | Second round |
| 2016 | III liiga E | 4 | 12 | 22 | 12 | 2 | 8 | 59 | 53 | +6 | 38 | Sergei Akimov (32) | Second round |
| 2017 | III liiga E | 7 | 12 | 22 | 8 | 3 | 11 | 48 | 52 | −4 | 27 | Margus Porkveli (12) | Second round |
| 2018 | III liiga E | 11 | 12 | 22 | 7 | 1 | 14 | 37 | 48 | −11 | 22 | Elari Jõendi (9) | Second round |
