= FC Vastseliina =

Estonian football club

Vastseliina
- Full name: Football Club Vastseliina
- Founded: 2008
- Ground: Vastseliina Gümnaasiumi jalgpalliväljak, Vastseliina
- League: III liiga South
- 2022: III liiga, 5th

FC Vastseliina is an Estonian football club based in Vastseliina. Founded in 2008, they currently play in the III liiga, the fifth tier of Estonian football. Vastseliina Gümnaasiumi jalgpalliväljak is their home stadium.

== Players ==
=== Current squad ===
As of 23 May 2017.

Note: Flags indicate national team as defined under FIFA eligibility rules; some limited exceptions apply. Players may hold more than one non-FIFA nationality.

No.	Pos.	Nation	Player
1	GK	(Estonia) EST	Martin Suviste
2	FW	(Estonia) EST	Rene Tamm
2	DF	(Estonia) EST	Kauri Täht
3	DF	(Estonia) EST	Tauri Maidla
4	DF	(Estonia) EST	Marek Ansberg
5	MF	(Estonia) EST	Sander Pild
6	MF	(Estonia) EST	Kristjan Nedo
7	DF	(Estonia) EST	Tõnis Uiboupin
8	MF	(Estonia) EST	Kristjan Kikkas
9	FW	(Estonia) EST	Margus Ader

No.	Pos.	Nation	Player
9	DF	(Estonia) EST	Kristjan Kurrikoff
10	MF	(Estonia) EST	Marved Silm
14	MF	(Estonia) EST	Romet Palmik
17	MF	(Estonia) EST	Gaspar Vainula
18	MF	(Estonia) EST	Janar Urbanik
22	DF	(Estonia) EST	Raul Juur
23	MF	(Estonia) EST	Artur Palok
25	MF	(Estonia) EST	Jürgen Kuljus
27	DF	(Estonia) EST	Olavi Laurson
29	DF	(Estonia) EST	Andres Kranich

== Statistics ==
=== League and Cup ===
Season	Division	Pos	Teams	Pld	W	D	L	GF	GA	GD	Pts	Avg. Att.	Top Goalscorer	Estonian Cup	Notes
2008	IV liiga S	6	12	22	10	2	10	50	46	+4	32		Jürgen Kaur (16)		as Vastseliina FC Aspen
2009	IV liiga S	4	11	20	10	2	8	39	40	−1	32	20	Jürgen Kaur (9)	Second round	as Vastseliina FC Aspen
2010	IV liiga S	10	11	20	4	5	11	23	76	−53	17	11	Kristo Perli (6)	Second round	as Vastseliina FC Aspen
2011	IV liiga S	8	9	16	3	3	10	24	44	−20	12	19	Janar Urbanik and Tammo Puura (5)	Second round	as Vastseliina FC Aspen
2012	IV liiga S	9	12	22	5	4	13	41	61	−20	19	24	Artur Palok (10)	First round	as Vastseliina FC Aspen
2013	IV liiga S	3	12	22	14	1	5	58	27	+31	43	27	Gaspar Vainula (12)		as Vastseliina FC Aspen
2014	III liiga S	12	12	22	4	0	18	34	68	−34	12	19	4 players (6)	First round	as Vastseliina FC Aspen
2015	III liiga S	12	12	22	3	4	15	45	63	−18	13	22	Erki Alliksoo (12)	Fourth round	as Vastseliina FC Tannem
2016	III liiga S	3	12	22	13	4	5	74	40	+34	43	32	Erki Alliksoo (24)	Fourth round	as Vastseliina FC Tannem
2017	III liiga S	3	12	22	13	3	6	68	46	+22	42	34	Artur Palok (14)	First round	as FC Vastseliina
2018	III liiga S	5	12	22	12	3	7	66	58	+8	39	37	Erki Alliksoo (29)	Second round	as FC Vastseliina
2019	III liiga S	5	12	22	13	1	8	93	62	+31	40	35	Erki Alliksoo (34)	Second round	as FC Vastseliina
2020	III liiga S	4	12	22	15	1	6	74	42	+32	46	48	Risto Saarniit (23)	Second round	as FC Vastseliina
