= JK Loo =

Estonian football club

- Full name: Jalgpalliklubi Loo
- Founded: 2008; 17 years ago
- Ground: Loo kunstmuruväljak
- Manager: Eerik Elenurm
- League: III liiga East
- 2022: III liiga, 7th
Home colours	Away colours

JK Loo is a football club, based in Loo, Estonia.

Founded in 2008, the club has played in the III liiga since 2015.

== Players ==
=== Current squad ===
As of 7 October 2018.

Note: Flags indicate national team as defined under FIFA eligibility rules; some limited exceptions apply. Players may hold more than one non-FIFA nationality.

No.	Pos.	Nation	Player
2	DF	(Estonia) EST	Anton Gramberg
5	DF	(Estonia) EST	Rasmus Juurik
6	DF	(Estonia) EST	Jaan-Kristjan Kabal
8	MF	(Estonia) EST	Eerik Elenurm
9	MF	(Estonia) EST	Bert Mägi
10	FW	(Estonia) EST	Marten Orav
14	MF	(Estonia) EST	Kaspar Kubber
15	DF	(Estonia) EST	Mait Metsküla
21	MF	(Estonia) EST	Oktai Agašov
22	MF	(Estonia) EST	Silver Palu
23	DF	(Estonia) EST	Väle Võlma

No.	Pos.	Nation	Player
74	GK	(Estonia) EST	Anatoli Orlov
91	FW	(Estonia) EST	Aleksandr Košelev
97	FW	(Estonia) EST	Raimo Laid
99	GK	(Estonia) EST	Stanislav Gruzdov
—	GK	(Estonia) EST	Siim Allmann
—	GK	(Estonia) EST	Kevin Berg
—	GK	(France) FRA	Ludovic Joao Carrico
—	GK	(Estonia) EST	Matteus Lehiste
—		(Cameroon) CMR	Patrick Ndongo Ebi
—	GK	(Estonia) EST	Jarlin Pentus
—	MF	(Estonia) EST	Taavi Vaher

== Statistics ==
=== League and Cup ===
Season	Division	Pos	Pld	W	D	L	GF	GA	GD	Pts	Avg. Att.	Top goalscorer	Cup
2008	IV liiga E	5	20	9	3	8	53	44	+9	30		(Estonia) Siim Allmann (25)	
2009	III liiga E	12	22	2	0	20	27	119	−92	6	15	(Estonia) Siim Allmann (14)	
2010	IV liiga E	11	22	5	1	16	36	73	−37	16		(Estonia) Marcus Pruuli and Siim Allmann (11)	First round
2011	IV liiga E	2	22	14	6	2	80	25	+55	48		(Estonia) Raimo Laid (28)	Second round
2012	III liiga E	4	22	12	2	2	46	41	+5	38	22	(Estonia) Raimo Laid (13)	First round
2013	II liiga N/E	11	24	6	3	15	33	80	−47	31	15	(Estonia) Raimo Laid (10)	First round
2014	II liiga N/E	14	26	2	0	24	28	147	−119	6	11	(Estonia) Siim Allmann (8)	First round
2015	III liiga E	8	22	7	1	14	44	90	−46	22	13	(Estonia) Eerik Elenurm (12)	Second round
2016	III liiga E	9	22	8	1	13	39	69	−30	25	8	(Estonia) Siim Allmann (8)	Second round
2017	III liiga E	8	22	7	5	10	42	62	−20	26	10	(Estonia) Siim Allmann (11)	Second round
2018	III liiga E	2	22	13	4	5	60	35	+25	43	14	(Estonia) Siim Allmann (17)	First round
2019	III liiga E	7	22	10	2	10	51	55	-4	32	13	(Estonia) Gerdo Kalde (15)	Second round
2020	III liiga E	8	18	5	2	11	30	75	-45	17	15	(Estonia) Marten Orav (8)	Second round
