= FC Jõgeva Wolves =

Estonian football club

- Founded: 2014
- Ground: Jõgeva linnastaadion
- Manager: Kervin Kull
- League: III Liiga
- 2022: III liiga S, 11th
Home colours	Away colours

FC Jõgeva Wolves is an Estonian football club based in Jõgeva. Founded in 2014, they currently play in the II liiga, the fifth tier of Estonian football. Jõgeva Wolves also has reserve teams: FC Äksi Wolves, who play in the III liiga and FC Tallinna Wolves, who play in the IV liiga.

== Players ==
=== Current squad ===
As of 10 April 2023.

Note: Flags indicate national team as defined under FIFA eligibility rules; some limited exceptions apply. Players may hold more than one non-FIFA nationality.

No.	Pos.	Nation	Player
1	GK	(Estonia) EST	Tiit Teearu
2	DF	(Estonia) EST	Kaspar Kull
3	FW	(Estonia) EST	Roland Lehismets
4	DF	(Estonia) EST	Richard Lehismets
6	DF	(Estonia) EST	Brein Agu
7	FW	(Estonia) EST	Timo Padar
8	MF	(Estonia) EST	Uku Õunapuu
21	MF	(Estonia) EST	Hardi Lill
22	MF	(Estonia) EST	Heino Avi
23	FW	(Estonia) EST	Eduard Kovbasnjuk
25	MF	(Estonia) EST	Silver Linde
28	FW	(Estonia) EST	Kristjan Tüür
31	MF	(Estonia) EST	Siim Kangur
46	DF	(Estonia) EST	Maikel Võsu
50	DF	(Estonia) EST	Kristo Päkko

No.	Pos.	Nation	Player
66	DF	(Estonia) EST	Vladislav Mihnovitš
75	DF	(Estonia) EST	Miko Sein
82	DF	(Estonia) EST	Raimond Järvsoo
88	DF	(Estonia) EST	Sergei Krivin
89	FW	(Estonia) EST	Karl Markus Kruuleht
90	DF	(Estonia) EST	Heigo Hallik
92	MF	(Estonia) EST	Kervin Kull
97	MF	(India) IND	Sharib Khan
—	MF	(Estonia) EST	Oliver Berg
—	FW	(Estonia) EST	Kaido Johanson
—	GK	(Estonia) EST	Andro Jakobi
—	MF	(Estonia) EST	Kevin Keek
—	DF	(Estonia) EST	Riigo Paumets
—	MF	(Norway) NOR	Ravn Rydtun

== Statistics ==
=== League and Cup ===
Season	Division	Pos	Teams	Pld	W	D	L	GF	GA	GD	Pts	Avg. Att.	Top Goalscorer	Estonian Cup
2015	IV liiga S	10	10	18	2	0	16	21	103	−82	6		Stenver Kleimann-Leimann (6)	First round
2016	IV liiga S	2	7	18	11	2	5	69	50	+19	35		Stenver Kleimann-Leimann (22)	Second round
2017	III liiga S	9	12	22	9	3	10	44	39	+5	30		Stenver Kleimann-Leimann (16)	Second round
2018	III liiga S	4	12	22	12	3	7	73	58	+15	39	45	Eduard Kovbasnjuk (23)	First round
2019	II liiga N/E	13	14	26	5	4	17	42	111	–69	19	36	Eduard Kovbasnjuk (21)	First round
2020	II liiga N/E	14	14	26	3	1	22	21	133	–112	10	59	Marko Murumaa (6)	Second round
