= Tallinna FC Zapoos =

Estonian football club

- Founded: 2013
- Ground: Kalevi Keskstaadion
- League: III Liiga
- 2017: IV Liiga N/E, 4th
Home colours	Away colours

Tallinna FC Zapoos is an Estonian football club based in Tallinn. Founded in January 2013, they currently play in the III Liiga, the fifth tier of Estonian football. They also joined the IV Liiga in 2017 and before that they played in Rahvaliiga.

== Players ==
=== Current squad ===
As of 31 July 2018.

Note: Flags indicate national team as defined under FIFA eligibility rules; some limited exceptions apply. Players may hold more than one non-FIFA nationality.

No.	Pos.	Nation	Player
1	GK	(Estonia) EST	Johan Pastarus
2	DF	(Estonia) EST	Rene Aleksander Truuts
3	MF	(Estonia) EST	Markus Somp
5	DF	(Estonia) EST	Robert Krikk
6	MF	(Estonia) EST	Andreas Holst
7	MF	(Estonia) EST	Marken Malm
9	MF	(Estonia) EST	Kristjan Erik Pedak
10	FW	(Estonia) EST	Kevin Mätas
12	MF	(Estonia) EST	Kris Oliver Maiberg
14	DF	(Estonia) EST	Oskar Pukk
15	MF	(Estonia) EST	Christopher Wallace Kehinde
17	MF	(Estonia) EST	Andri Kaljumäe
20	DF	(Estonia) EST	Andreas Ignacio Hinojosa
21	DF	(Estonia) EST	Kristjan Toomela

No.	Pos.	Nation	Player
23	FW	(Estonia) EST	Oliver-Gerd Vald
27	MF	(Estonia) EST	Mark-Rene Väljas
29	DF	(Estonia) EST	Karl Mihkel Pohga
33	MF	(Estonia) EST	Mark-Eerik Kodar
40	DF	(Estonia) EST	Sebastian Raudsepp
45	FW	(Estonia) EST	Karl Breemet
81	MF	(Estonia) EST	Markus Mikko
93	MF	(Estonia) EST	Karl-Joel Hussar
99	DF	(Estonia) EST	Mario Saunpere
—	FW	(Estonia) EST	Jesper Juha
—	FW	(Estonia) EST	Jürgen Orumaa
—	DF	(Estonia) EST	Markus Remmet
—	DF	(Estonia) EST	Kristjan Baikov
—	DF	(Estonia) EST	Märt Bakler

== Statistics ==
=== League and Cup ===
Season	Division	Pos	Teams	Pld	W	D	L	GF	GA	GD	Pts	Top Goalscorer	Estonian Cup
2017	IV liiga N/E	4	9	16	10	2	4	45	25	+20	32	Jürgen Orumaa — 25	First round
2018	III liiga N	2	12	22	13	2	7	69	52	+17	41	Markus Mikko — 16	Second round
2019	III liiga N	3	12	22	14	2	6	81	39	+42	44	Mark-Rene Väljas — 25	First round
2020	III liiga N	4	12	22	14	1	7	94	44	+50	42	Mark-Rene Väljas — 28	First round
