= Pärnu JK Poseidon =

Estonian football club

- Full name: Pärnu Jalgpalliklubi Poseidon
- Founded: 2013
- Ground: Pärnu kunstmurustaadion, Pärnu
- Manager: Martin Kuldmägi
- League: III Liiga
- 2022: III liiga West, 4th
- Website: https://jkposeidon.ee/
Home colours	Away colours

Pärnu JK Poseidon is a football club based in Pärnu, Estonia.

It has a reserve team, Pärnu JK Poseidon II, that currently plays in the IV Liiga.

== Statistics ==
=== League and Cup ===
Season	Division	Pos	Teams	Pld	W	D	L	GF	GA	GD	Pts	Top Goalscorer	Estonian Cup	Notes
2014	IV liiga S	3	9	16	9	3	4	39	30	+9	30	Lauri Lilleste (14)	First round	
2015	IV liiga W	1	10	18	13	1	4	58	32	+26	40	Lauri Lilleste (22)	Second round	
2016	III liiga W	6	12	22	10	2	10	47	49	-2	32	Joonas Einfeldt and Ülari Tohver (13)	Third round	
2017	III liiga W	1	12	22	16	5	1	74	20	+54	53	Madis Tammsaar (13)	Third round	
2018	II liiga S/W	7	14	26	10	3	13	45	62	-17	33	Joonas Einfeldt (9)	Third round	
2019	II liiga S/W	12	14	26	8	2	16	47	80	-33	26	Artur Šalda (23)	Second round	
