= FC Kose =

Estonian football club

- Full name: Football Club Kose
- Founded: 1998
- Ground: Oru Põhikooli staadion, Kose
- Manager: Martin Bukin
- League: II liiga
- 2022: II liiga S/W, 13th
Home colours

FC Kose is a football club based in Kose, Estonia.

== Players ==
=== Current squad ===
As of 29 September 2018.

Note: Flags indicate national team as defined under FIFA eligibility rules; some limited exceptions apply. Players may hold more than one non-FIFA nationality.

No.	Pos.	Nation	Player
1	GK	(Estonia) EST	Jalmar Loik
3	MF	(Estonia) EST	Martin Virroja
4	DF	(Estonia) EST	Kaivar Kull
5	MF	(Estonia) EST	Lauri Mihkelson
6	MF	(Estonia) EST	Markos Leppik
7	MF	(Estonia) EST	Andreas Hein
8	MF	(Estonia) EST	Sander Mölder
9	FW	(Estonia) EST	Kalle Mihkelson
10	DF	(Estonia) EST	Tormi Talirand
11	MF	(Estonia) EST	Madis Rosar
12	MF	(Estonia) EST	Georg Marten Tintse
13	DF	(Estonia) EST	Martin Viiklaid
16	MF	(Estonia) EST	Jorge Veeoja
17	MF	(Estonia) EST	Henry Lemmsalu
18	MF	(Estonia) EST	Rene Aljas

No.	Pos.	Nation	Player
21	MF	(Estonia) EST	Sven-August Tomson
22	DF	(Estonia) EST	Karl Oskar Tintse
23	FW	(Estonia) EST	Ken Metsis
24	MF	(Estonia) EST	Vladimir Rogožin
25	MF	(Estonia) EST	Jaagup Jaanovits
26	DF	(Estonia) EST	Siim Suurkask
27	FW	(Estonia) EST	Tõnis Tüli
28	MF	(Estonia) EST	Kent Aus
29	DF	(Estonia) EST	Martti Pent
30	FW	(Estonia) EST	Alari Toom
31	GK	(Estonia) EST	Erlend Rohtsaar
44	MF	(Estonia) EST	Rando Vilbiks
45	DF	(Estonia) EST	Kalmer Filatov
69	MF	(Estonia) EST	Kaspar Hordo
—	GK	(Estonia) EST	Georg Ander Sild

== Statistics ==
=== League and Cup ===
Season	Division	Pos	Teams	Pld	W	D	L	GF	GA	GD	Pts	Avg. Att.	Top Goalscorer	Estonian Cup
1999	V liiga S	3	5	14	6	0	8	14	22	−8	18		Alari Toom (5)	
2000	IV liiga W	3	6	20	10	4	6	35	20	+15	34		Harry Riitmuru (9)	
2001	III liiga W	3	10	18	9	4	5	37	32	+5	31		Enno Valgmaa (12)	
2002	III liiga W	2	10	18	9	5	4	40	19	+21	32		Alari Toom (10)	
2003	III liiga W	2	10	18	13	2	3	81	31	+50	41		Kauri Sild (29)	
2004	III liiga W	2	10	18	10	4	4	46	27	+19	34		Lauri Mihkelson (10)	
2005	II liiga S/W	6	8	28	7	5	16	25	56	−31	26		Kauri Sild (6)	
2006	II liiga S/W	8	8	28	1	6	21	28	87	−59	9		Lauri Mihkelson (11)	
2007	III liiga W	10	12	22	4	3	15	19	63	−44	15		Kalle Mihkelson (4)	
2008	IV liiga W	3	12	22	14	4	4	85	23	+62	46		Kalle Mihkelson (21)	Second round
2009	III liiga W	3	12	22	13	3	6	64	31	+33	42	24	Tõnis Tüli (14)	Second round
2010	III liiga W	2	12	22	13	5	4	58	25	+33	44	21	Lauri Mihkelson (14)	First round
2011	III liiga W	7	12	22	9	3	10	71	74	−3	30	20	Tõnis Tüli (15)	First round
2012	III liiga W	10	12	22	5	2	15	27	63	−36	17	23	Tõnis Tüli (8)	Third round
2013	III liiga W	9	12	22	6	4	12	39	56	−17	22	15	Kalle Mihkelson (11)	First round
2014	III liiga W	1	12	22	14	5	3	74	21	+53	47	29	Lauri Mihkelson (17)	Third round
2015	II liiga S/W	10	14	26	9	4	13	48	70	−22	31	27	Lauri Mihkelson (12)	First round
2016	II liiga S/W	13	14	26	4	0	22	20	89	−69	12	19	Madis Rosar (4)	Second round
2017	III liiga W	8	12	22	8	3	11	29	44	−15	27	21	Madis Rosar (8)	First round
2018	III liiga W	1	12	22	18	4	0	97	22	+75	58	36	Pelle Pohlak (34)	Third round
