= 1996–97 Meistriliiga =

Estonian national championships in football

Meistriliiga
- Season: 1996–97
- Champions: Lantana (2nd title)
- Top goalscorer: Sergei Bragin (18)

The 1996–97 Meistriliiga was the sixth season of the Meistriliiga, Estonia's premier football league. Lantana won their second title.

== Preliminary round ==
=== League table ===
Pos	Team	Pld	W	D	L	GF	GA	GD	Pts	Qualification
1	Lantana	14	11	2	1	30	9	+21	35	Qualification for Championship Tournament
2	Flora	14	9	2	3	27	9	+18	29	Qualification for Championship Tournament
3	Marlekor	14	6	4	4	20	17	+3	22	Qualification for Championship Tournament
4	Lelle	14	5	6	3	20	16	+4	21	Qualification for Championship Tournament
5	Narva Trans	14	5	5	4	20	19	+1	20	Qualification for Championship Tournament
6	Tallinna Sadam	14	5	1	8	24	26	−2	16	Qualification for Championship Tournament
7	Eesti Põlevkivi Jõhvi	14	4	1	9	10	20	−10	13	Qualification for Meistriliiga Transition Tournament
8	Vall	14	0	1	13	9	44	−35	1	Qualification for Meistriliiga Transition Tournament

=== Results ===
Home \ Away	JEP	FLO	LAN	LEL	MAR	SAD	TRS	VAL
Eesti Põlevkivi Jõhvi		0–1	0–1	0–3	0–3	2–1	0–1	2–1
Flora	2–0		1–1	3–0	1–2	1–0	1–1	3–0
Lantana	1–0	2–1		2–0	5–1	3–1	2–1	+:- (Note: Result canceled – JK Vall used a disqualified player. The initial score was 5-1 for Lantana.)
Lelle	2–0	0–4	1–1		0–0	4–1	0–0	4–1
Marlekor	0–2	0–3	1–3	0–0		2–0	0–0	3–0
Tallinna Sadam	3–0	3–1	0–3	1–1	1–3		3–4	4–0
Narva Trans	0–0	0–1	2–1	2–2	0–3	2–3		5–3
Vall	1–4	0–4	0–5	1–3	2–2	0–3	0–2	

Legend: Blue = home team win; Yellow = draw; Red = away team win.

== Championship Tournament ==
The points obtained during the preliminary round were carried over halved and rounded up.

=== League table ===
Pos	Team	Pld	W	D	L	GF	GA	GD	BP	Pts	Qualification
1	Lantana (C)	10	7	2	1	22	6	+16	18	41	Qualification for Champions League first qualifying round
2	Flora	10	7	2	1	25	7	+18	15	38	Qualification for UEFA Cup first qualifying round
3	Tallinna Sadam	10	5	1	4	13	9	+4	8	24	Qualification for Cup Winners' Cup qualifying round
4	Lelle	10	3	0	7	6	21	−15	11	20	
5	Marlekor	10	2	2	6	7	19	−12	11	19	
6	Narva Trans	10	2	1	7	8	19	−11	10	17	

(C) Champions

=== Results ===
Home \ Away	FLO	LAN	LEL	MAR	SAD	TRS
Flora		4–2	5–1	2–0	0–1	5–1
Lantana	0–0		3–0	7–0	2–0	1–0
Lelle	0–2	0–2		3–0	0–4	+:- (Note: Narva Trans did not show up.)
Marlekor	1–2	1–1	0–1		0–1	3–1
Tallinna Sadam	1–1	0–2	3–1	0–1		3–1
Narva Trans	0–4	1–2	2–0	1–1	1–0	

Legend: Blue = home team win; Yellow = draw; Red = away team win.

== Meistriliiga Transition Tournament ==
Eesti Põlevkivi Jõhvi and PVall, the teams finishing in the last two positions in the preliminary round, faced four best teams of the 1996-97 Esiliiga in the play-off for two places in the 1997-98 Meistriliiga.

Pos	Team	Pld	W	D	L	GF	GA	GD	Pts	Promotion or relegation
1	Eesti Põlevkivi Jõhvi	10	8	1	1	28	5	+23	25	Promotion to Meistriliiga
2	Vall	10	7	1	2	29	15	+14	22	Promotion to Meistriliiga
3	Pärnu JK	10	4	1	5	9	27	−18	13	Relegation to Esiliiga
4	FC Lelle	10	4	0	6	22	18	+4	12	Relegation to Esiliiga
5	TJK	10	2	2	6	11	19	−8	8	Relegation to Esiliiga
6	Sillamäe Kalev	10	1	3	6	6	21	−15	6	Relegation to Esiliiga

== Top scorers ==
Rank	Player	Club	Goals
1	(Estonia) Sergei Bragin	Lantana	18
2	(Estonia) Andres Oper	Flora	13
3	(Estonia) Maksim Gruznov	Lantana	12
4	(Finland) Jonatan Johansson	Flora	9
4	(Estonia) Stanislav Kitto	Narva Trans	9

== See also ==
- 1996 in Estonian football
- 1997 in Estonian football
