= 1997–98 Estonian Cup =

Eighth season of the Estonian main domestic football cup

Eesti Karikas

Tournament details
- Country: Estonia
- Teams: 40

Final positions
- Champions: Flora (2nd title)
- Runners-up: Lantana

Tournament statistics
- Matches played: 41
- Goals scored: 188 (4.59 per match)

The 1997–98 Estonian Cup (Estonian: Eesti Karikas) was the eighth season of the Estonian football knockout tournament. Originally, winners of the cup qualified for the 1998–99 UEFA Cup Winners' Cup qualifying round. The defending champion, Tallinna Sadam, was knocked out in the quarter-final against Lantana.

The competition culminated with the final held at Kuressaare linnastaadion, Kuressaare on 20 June 1998 with Flora taking the title 3–2. Since the Flora also win the 1997–98 Meistriliiga, the cup runners-up Lantana were qualified for the UEFA Cup Winners' Cup.

All in all, 40 teams took part of the competition.

== First preliminary round ==
Team 1	Score	Team 2
21 August
Sadam Muuga	3–1	Kalju
Lasnamäe	w/o	M.C. Tallinn
Rada/HKL	2–3	Kiviõli
Fortuna Tapa	1–1 (a.e.t.) (5–4 p)	Veteran Kohtla-Järve
Jalgpallikool Tartu	10–3	Põlva Lootos
Tulevik II	10–0	Kalevi Jägala
Atli	2–1	FC Tallinn

== Second preliminary round ==
Team 1	Score	Team 2
3 September
Alvigo	1–5	Vigri
Tempori	3–2	Kompanii Märjamaa
Atli	3–2	Junior Maardu
Kiviõli	w/o	Sadam Muuga
Tulevik II	2–1	Veteran Maardu
M.C. Tallinn	3–0	Fortuna Tapa
Narva Baltika	w/o	Keila
Jalgpallikool Tartu	0–2	FC Lelle

== Round of 32 ==
Team 1	Score	Team 2
17 September
FC Lelle	1–0	Sillamäe Kalev
Tempori	1–2	Pärnu JK
Keila	1–2	Merkuur
Kiviõli	5–0	Dokker
M.C. Tallinn	3–2	Olümp Maardu
Atli	w/o	Vall
Tulevik II	4–2	Dünamo

== Round of 16 ==
Team 1	Score	Team 2
1 October
Atli	0–7	Narva Trans
Tulevik II	0–2	Eesti Põlevkivi Jõhvi
Pärnu JK	0–6	Lantana
Kiviõli	0–3	Lelle SK
17 October
M.C. Tallinn	0–4	Tulevik
FC Lelle	0–6	Tallinna Sadam
Merkuur	0–7	Flora
Vigri	0–5	TVMK

== Quarter-finals ==
The first legs were played on 22 April 1998 and the second legs were played on 6 May 1998.

22 April 1998

Flora	5–0	Eesti Põlevkivi Jõhvi
Kristal 37'; Viikmäe 65'; Reim 70'; Ražanauskas 77'; Zelinski 88'	Report

Kadriorg Stadium
Referee: Oleg Timofejev
6 May 1998

Eesti Põlevkivi Jõhvi	0–7	Flora
	Report	Meet; Alsaker; Terehhov; Kristal; Oper

Referee: Uno Tutk

Flora won 12–0 on aggregate.

22 April 1998

Lantana	2–0	Tallinna Sadam
Kulikov 76'; Toštšev 82' (pen.)	Report

Referee: Valeriy Vinogradov
6 May 1998

Tallinna Sadam	0–0	Lantana
	Report

Referee: Sten Kaldma

Lantana won 2–0 on aggregate.

22 April 1998

Tulevik	2–2	TVMK
Allas 21'; Vessenberg 88' (pen.)	Report	Novozhilov 27' (pen.); Pasikuta 84'

Referee: Margus Kotter
6 May 1998

TVMK	1–2	Tulevik
Shapovalov	Report	Arbeiter

Referee: Valeriy Vinogradov

Viljandi Tulevik won 4–3 on aggregate.

22 April 1998

Lelle SK	2–2	Narva Trans
Rooba; Blinstrubas	Report	Nejolov; Molev

Referee: Jüri Saar
6 May 1998

Narva Trans	5–1	Lelle SK
Kitto; Molev; Nejolov; Zamorski	Report	Musayev

Referee: Oleg Timofeyev

Narva Trans won 7–3 on aggregate.

== Semi-finals ==
The first legs were played on 20 May 1998 and the second legs were played on 24 May 1998.

20 May 1998

Tulevik	0–0	Flora
	Report

Referee: Oleg Timofejev
24 May 1998

Flora	3–1	Tulevik
Terehhov 21'; Zelinski 43', 52'	Report	Priidel 28'

Referee: Uno Tutk

Flora won 3–1 on aggregate.

20 May 1998

Narva Trans	0–4	Lantana
	Report	Toštšev; Tjunin; Leitan

Referee: Margus Kotter
24 May 1998

Lantana	3–0	Narva Trans
	Report

Referee: Sten Kaldma

Lantana won 7–0 on aggregate.

== Final ==
The final took place on 20 June 1998 in Kuressaare. Flora won a double after also winning the 1997–98 Meistriliiga.

20 June 1998

Flora	3–2	Lantana
Oper 8', 72'; Zelinski 83'	Report	Jeršov 39'; Leitan 70'

Kuressaare linnastaadion, Kuressaare
Attendance: 300
Referee: Margus Kotter
