= 1992–93 Meistriliiga =

Estonian football league season for the highest division

Meistriliiga
- Season: 1992–93
- Champions: Norma (2nd title)
- Relegated: Tulevik
- Champions League: Norma
- Cup Winners' Cup: Nikol
- Top goalscorer: Sergei Bragin (27)

The 1992–93 Meistriliiga was the second season of the Meistriliiga, Estonia's premier football league. Norma won their second title.

== League table ==
| Pos | Team | Pld | W | D | L | GF | GA | GD | Pts | Qualification or relegation |
|---|---|---|---|---|---|---|---|---|---|---|
| 1 | Norma (C) | 22 | 20 | 2 | 0 | 102 | 16 | +86 | 42 | Qualification for Champions League preliminary round |
| 2 | Flora | 22 | 15 | 4 | 3 | 63 | 13 | +50 | 34 | |
| 3 | Nikol | 22 | 15 | 3 | 4 | 58 | 17 | +41 | 33 | Qualification for Cup Winners' Cup qualifying round |
| 4 | Eesti Põlevkivi Jõhvi | 22 | 13 | 6 | 3 | 53 | 20 | +33 | 32 | |
| 5 | Vigri | 22 | 10 | 7 | 5 | 61 | 33 | +28 | 27 | |
| 6 | Narva Trans | 22 | 11 | 2 | 9 | 51 | 34 | +17 | 24 | |
| 7 | Kohtla-Järve Keemik | 22 | 7 | 4 | 11 | 30 | 56 | −26 | 18 | |
| 8 | EsDAG | 22 | 5 | 3 | 14 | 30 | 75 | −45 | 13 | |
| 9 | Dünamo | 22 | 4 | 5 | 13 | 24 | 50 | −26 | 13 | |
| 10 | Merkuur | 22 | 4 | 4 | 14 | 17 | 63 | −46 | 12 | |
| 11 | Sillamäe Kalev (Note: Sillamäe Kalev retained their Meistriliiga spot as Kohtla-Järve Keemik were disbanded after the season.) | 22 | 4 | 1 | 17 | 17 | 65 | −48 | 9 | Relegation to Esiliiga |
| 12 | Tulevik (R) | 22 | 3 | 1 | 18 | 24 | 88 | −64 | 7 | Relegation to Esiliiga |

(C) Champions; (R) Relegated

== Results ==
| Home \ Away | NOR | FLO | NIK | VGR | DÜN | DAG | MER | TUL | NAR | KEM | SIL | EPJ |
|---|---|---|---|---|---|---|---|---|---|---|---|---|
| Norma | | 1–0 | 2–1 | 3–0 | 3–0 | 19–0 | 5–0 | 3–1 | 5–2 | 4–1 | 4–0 | 1–1 |
| Flora | 1–3 | | 3–1 | 2–2 | 2–1 | 9–0 | 8–0 | 4–0 | 2–1 | 3–0 | 5–0 | 2–0 |
| Nikol | 0–1 | 1–1 | | 1–1 | 7–1 | 4–1 | 1–0 | 8–1 | 3–2 | 8–1 | 5–0 | 1–0 |
| Vigri | 4–6 | 0–0 | 0–2 | | 4–0 | 7–3 | 2–1 | 7–2 | 1–1 | 6–0 | 4–1 | 1–1 |
| Dünamo | 0–5 | 0–2 | 0–1 | 0–0 | | 3–1 | 2–2 | 3–1 | 1–2 | 0–0 | 0–0 | 0–5 |
| EsDAG | 0–3 | 2–1 | 1–1 | 1–2 | 2–0 | | 1–0 | 3–2 | 2–4 | 2–3 | 3–0 | 0–0 |
| Merkuur | 1–5 | 0–3 | 0–4 | 1–5 | 0–4 | 4–2 | | 2–0 | 1–0 | 0–0 | 0–2 | 1–1 |
| Tulevik | 0–11 | 0–6 | 0–2 | 0–7 | 3–2 | 1–1 | 4–1 | | 0–4 | 0–3 | 7–0 | 0–1 |
| Narva Trans | 3–4 | 0–2 | 0–1 | 2–2 | 5–2 | 3–1 | 4–0 | 5–0 | | 4–0 | 2–0 | 2–3 |
| Keemik | 1–10 | 0–2 | 0–1 | 0–4 | 1–1 | 3–1 | 1–1 | 1–0 | 2–3 | | 5–1 | 3–4 |
| Sillamäe Kalev | 0–4 | 0–4 | 0–5 | 3–2 | 1–3 | 3–1 | 1–2 | 3–1 | 1–2 | 0–2 | | 1–3 |
| Eesti Põlevkivi Jõhvi | 0–0 | 1–1 | 2–0 | 3–0 | 3–1 | 3–2 | 8–0 | 11–1 | 1–0 | 1–3 | 1–0 | |

Source: RSSSF – Estonia 1992/93
Legend: Blue = home team win; Yellow = draw; Red = away team win.

== Top scorers ==
| Rank | Player | Club | Goals |
|---|---|---|---|
| 1 | (Estonia) Sergei Bragin | Norma | 27 |
| 2 | (Estonia) Aleksandr Žurkin | Norma | 18 |
| 3 | (Estonia) Andrei Borissov | Norma | 16 |
| 3 | (Estonia) Valeri Možžuhhin | Nikol | 16 |
| 3 | (Estonia) Sergei Zamorski | Flora | 16 |
| 6 | (Russia) Sergei Afanasyev | Eesti Põlevkivi | 13 |
| 6 | (Estonia) Juri Braiko | Keemik | 13 |
| 8 | (Estonia) Indro Olumets | Flora | 11 |
| 8 | (Estonia) Martin Reim | Flora | 11 |
| 8 | (Estonia) Nikolai Toštšev | Trans | 11 |
| 8 | (Estonia) Dmitri Ustritski | Vigri | 11 |

== See also ==
- 1992 in Estonian football
- 1993 in Estonian football
- 1992–93 Esiliiga
