= 1992 Meistriliiga =

Estonian football league season for the highest division

Meistriliiga
- Season: 1992
- Champions: Norma (1st title)
- Relegated: Maardu
- Champions League: Norma
- Top goalscorer: Sergei Bragin (18)

The 1992 Meistriliiga was the inaugural season of the Meistriliiga, the top division of the Estonian football. It was the first domestic competition since the Baltic nation had gained independence from the Soviet Union in 1991. Fourteen teams competed in this edition, played in the spring to make the transition to autumn to spring season in the same year. Norma Tallinn won the title.

== Preliminary round ==
=== Western Group ===
Pos	Team	Pld	W	D	L	GF	GA	GD	Pts	Qualification
1	Norma	6	6	0	0	29	3	+26	12	Qualification for Championship Tournament
2	TVMV	6	4	1	1	21	6	+15	9	Qualification for Championship Tournament
3	Vigri	6	4	0	2	16	14	+2	8	Qualification for Championship Tournament
4	Pärnu	6	2	2	2	10	12	−2	6	Qualification for Championship Tournament
5	Dünamo	6	2	1	3	7	12	−5	5	Qualification for Relegation Tournament
6	Viljandi	6	0	1	5	6	23	−17	1	Qualification for Relegation Tournament
7	Merkuur	6	0	1	5	5	24	−19	1	Qualification for Relegation Tournament

==== Results ====
Home \ Away	NOR	VMV	VIG	PJK	DÜN	TUL	MER
Norma		2–1	6–0	3–1	3–0	6–1	9–0
TVMV	1–2		2–1	4–0	3–0	4–3	4–3
Vigri	0–6	1–2		4–0	3–0	4–3	4–3
Pärnu	1–3	3–3	0–4		1–1	4–1	2–1
Dünamo	0–3	0–4	0–3	1–1		4–0	2–1
Viljandi	1–6	0–4	3–4	1–4	0–4		1–1
Merkuur	0–9	0–7	3–4	0–1	1–2	1–1	

Legend: Blue = home team win; Yellow = draw; Red = away team win.

=== Eastern Group ===
Pos	Team	Pld	W	D	L	GF	GA	GD	Pts	Qualification
1	Flora	6	5	1	0	36	4	+32	11	Qualification for Championship Tournament
2	Eesti Põlevkivi Jõhvi	6	3	3	0	18	8	+10	9	Qualification for Championship Tournament
3	Tartu Kalev	6	3	2	1	22	14	+8	8	Qualification for Championship Tournament
4	Narva Trans	6	3	2	1	14	9	+5	8	Qualification for Championship Tournament
5	Sillamäe Kalev	6	1	1	4	4	10	−6	3	Qualification for Relegation Tournament
6	Kohtla-Järve Keemik	6	1	1	4	5	13	−8	3	Qualification for Relegation Tournament
7	Maardu	6	0	0	6	3	44	−41	0	Qualification for Relegation Tournament

==== Results ====
Home \ Away	FLO	JEP	KAL	TRA	SIL	KEE	MAA
Flora		1–1	7–2	3–1	3–0	+:-	19–0
Eesti Põlevkivi Jõhvi	1–1		2–2	4–4	2–0	2–0	7–1
Tartu Kalev	2–7	2–2		2–2	2–1	4–1	10–1
Narva Trans	1–3	4–4	2–2		1–0	3–0	+:-
Sillamäe Kalev	0–3	0–2	1–2	0–1		1–1	2–1
Kohtla-Järve Keemik	-:+	0–2	1–4	0–3	1–1		+:-
Maardu	0–19	1–7	1–10	-:+	1–2	-:+	

Legend: Blue = home team win; Yellow = draw; Red = away team win.

== Championship Tournament ==
=== League table ===
Pos	Team	Pld	W	D	L	GF	GA	GD	Pts	Qualification
1	Norma (C)	7	5	2	0	22	4	+18	12	Qualification for Champions League preliminary round
2	Eesti Põlevkivi Jõhvi	7	3	4	0	23	14	+9	10	
3	TVMV	7	3	2	2	23	13	+10	8	
4	Flora	7	3	2	2	17	9	+8	8	
5	Vigri	7	3	0	4	9	16	−7	6	
6	Tartu Kalev	7	1	3	3	11	18	−7	5	
7	Narva Trans	7	1	2	4	9	28	−19	4	
8	Pärnu	7	1	1	5	10	22	−12	3	

(C) Champions

=== Results ===
Home \ Away	NOR	JEP	VMV	FLO	VIG	KAL	TRA	PJK
Norma		2–2		0–0		+:-	6–0	
Eesti Põlevkivi Jõhvi	2–2		5–3		6–1			3–1
TVMV		3–5		3–1		1–1	10–0	
Flora	0–0		1–3		1–2			4–0
Vigri		1–6		2–1		1–0	0–1	
Tartu Kalev	-:+		1–1		0–1			4–2
Narva Trans	0–6		0–10		1–0			1–3
Pärnu		1–3		0–4		2–4	3–1	

Legend: Blue = home team win; Yellow = draw; Red = away team win.

== Relegation Tournament ==
=== League table ===
Pos	Team	Pld	W	D	L	GF	GA	GD	Pts	Relegation
9	Dünamo	5	4	0	1	14	5	+9	8	
10	Kohtla-Järve Keemik	5	3	2	0	10	4	+6	8	
11	Sillamäe Kalev	5	2	2	1	8	8	0	6	
12	Merkuur	5	1	2	2	8	7	+1	4	Qualification for relegation play-offs
13	Viljandi (Note: Viljandi stayed in the Meistriliiga as Pärnu JK withdrew from the 1992-93 Meistriliiga, changed their name to Viljandi Tulevik)	5	1	2	2	11	11	0	4	Relegation to Esiliiga
14	Maardu (R)	5	0	0	5	4	20	−16	0	Relegation to Esiliiga

(R) Relegated

=== Results ===
Home \ Away	DÜN	KEE	MER	VIG	VIL	MAA
Dünamo		1–2	3–1			4–1
Kohtla-Järve Keemik	2–1			1–1	3–1	
Sillamäe Kalev	1–3			3–2	1–1	
Merkuur		1–1	2–3			3–0
Viljandi		1–3	1–1			8–2
Maardu	1–4			0–3	2–8	

Legend: Blue = home team win; Yellow = draw; Red = away team win.

== Relegation playoff ==
Merkuur	1 – 1	Narva Kreenholm

Narva Kreenholm	3 – 3	Merkuur

4–4 on aggregate. Merkuur won on away goals and retained its Meistriliiga spot for the 1992-93 season.

== Top scorers ==
Rank	Player	Club	Goals
1	(Estonia) Sergei Bragin	Norma	18
2	(Russia) Sergei Afanasyev	Eesti Põlevkivi	13
3	(Estonia) Valeri Možžuhhin	TVMV	12
4	(Russia) Oleg Guzik	TVMV	11
4	(Estonia) Urmas Kirs	Flora	11
6	(Estonia) Indro Olumets	Flora	7
6	(Estonia) Martin Reim	Flora	7
6	(Estonia) Aleksandr Žurkin	Norma	7

== See also ==
- 1992 in Estonian football
- 1992–93 Esiliiga
