= 1997–98 Esiliiga =

Estonian football league season for second division

Esiliiga
- Season: 1997–98
- Champions: JK Vall Tallinn
- Promoted: —
- Relegated: JK Dünamo Tallinn; Tallinna Jalgpallikool
- Top goalscorer: Aleksei Titov; Andrei Afanassov (13)

The 1997–98 Esiliiga is the seventh season of the Esiliiga, second-highest Estonian league for association football clubs, since its establishment in 1992.

== Main tournament ==
Four best teams qualify to the Premier Division promotion play-off, other four to First Division promotion play-off.

=== Table ===
Pos	Team	Pld	W	D	L	GF	GA	GD	Pts
1	JK Vall Tallinn	14	12	1	1	43	13	+30	37
2	Olümp Maardu	14	10	0	4	43	21	+22	30
3	JK Dokker Tallinn	14	6	3	5	30	26	+4	21
4	JK Merkuur Tartu	14	6	3	5	23	21	+2	18 (Note: Three points deducted for match fixing)
5	JK Dünamo Tallinn	14	5	4	5	33	31	+2	16
6	JK Kalev Sillamäe	14	4	2	8	21	33	−12	14
7	Pärnu JK	14	3	3	8	14	22	−8	12
8	Tallinna Jalgpallikool	14	2	0	12	12	52	−40	6

=== Top scorers ===
Pos	Name	Team	Gls
1	Aleksei Titov	JK Vall Tallinn	13
1	Andrei Afanassov	JK Vall Tallinn	13
3	Sergei Dõmov	JK Dünamo Tallinn	12
4	Juri Volkov	Olümp Maardu	9
5	Valeri Možžuhhin	JK Dokker Tallinn	8
5	Vadim Dolinin	JK Vall Tallinn	8
5	Eduard Potapenko	JK Dünamo Tallinn	8

== Premier Division promotion play-off ==
None of the four Esiliiga teams were able to finish in the top two, so that they all remain in the second level of Estonian football system.

=== Table ===
Pos	Team	Pld	W	D	L	GF	GA	GD	Pts
1	Lelle SK	10	8	2	0	52	10	+42	26
2	Eesti Põlevkivi Jõhvi	10	5	4	1	23	9	+14	19
3	JK Vall Tallinn	10	4	5	1	14	3	+11	17
4	JK Dokker Tallinn	10	2	2	6	11	28	−17	8
5	Olümp Maardu	10	2	1	7	10	40	−30	7
6	JK Merkuur Tartu	10	0	4	6	9	29	−20	4

=== Top scorers ===
Pos	Name	Team	Gls
1	Dmitri Ustritski	Lelle SK	13
2	Ruslan Musayev	Lelle SK	9
3	Meelis Rooba	Lelle SK	8
4	Erik Šteinberg	Eesti Põlevkivi Jõhvi	5
4	Janek Taan	Lelle SK	5

== First Division promotion play-off ==
Veteran Kohtla-Järve and KSK Vigri Tallinn were the two lucky teams to be promoted, both from Second Division Northern zone. On the other hand, two teams, JK Dünamo Tallinn and Tallinna Jalgpallikool, were relegated.

=== Table ===
Pos	Team	Pld	W	D	L	GF	GA	GD	Pts
1	Veteran Kohtla-Järve (P)	14	10	2	2	25	14	+11	32
2	KSK Vigri Tallinn (P)	14	9	5	0	46	16	+30	32
3	Pärnu JK	14	8	4	2	30	17	+13	28
4	JK Kalev Sillamäe	14	5	4	5	20	17	+3	19
5	JK Dünamo Tallinn (R)	14	3	4	7	30	37	−7	13
6	FC Hiiu Kalur Kärdla	14	3	4	7	18	28	−10	13
7	FC Lelle	14	2	4	8	14	28	−14	10
8	Tallinna Jalgpallikool (R)	14	1	3	10	7	39	−32	6

(P) Promoted; (R) Relegated

== See also ==
- 1997–98 Meistriliiga
- 1997 in Estonian football
- 1998 in Estonian football
