= 1997–98 Meistriliiga =

Estonian national championships in football

Meistriliiga
- Season: 1997–98
- Champions: Flora (3rd title)
- Top goalscorer: Konstantin Nahk (18)

The 1997–98 Meistriliiga was the seventh season of the Meistriliiga, Estonia's premier football league. Flora won their third title.

== Preliminary round ==
The preliminary round was played in the autumn. The top six teams continued the title play-off in the spring, taking half their points obtained in the preliminary round. The last two teams faced the top four of the Esiliiga in the Meistriliiga transition tournament.

=== League table ===
Pos	Team	Pld	W	D	L	GF	GA	GD	Pts	Qualification
1	Flora	14	12	1	1	39	6	+33	37	Qualification for Championship Tournament
2	Tallinna Sadam	14	9	4	1	42	15	+27	31	Qualification for Championship Tournament
3	Tulevik	14	6	2	6	21	20	+1	20	Qualification for Championship Tournament
4	Lantana	14	5	4	5	20	17	+3	19	Qualification for Championship Tournament
5	Narva Trans	14	4	3	7	13	26	−13	15	Qualification for Championship Tournament
6	TVMK	14	4	2	8	13	29	−16	14	Qualification for Championship Tournament
7	Eesti Põlevkivi Jõhvi	14	2	5	7	11	23	−12	11	Qualification for Meistriliiga Transition Tournament
8	Lelle	14	3	1	10	11	34	−23	10	Qualification for Meistriliiga Transition Tournament

Source: rsssf.com

=== Results ===
Home \ Away	JEP	FLO	LAN	LEL	SAD	TRS	TUL	TVM
Eesti Põlevkivi Jõhvi		0–1	0–0	1–2	1–1	2–2	1–0	2–2
Flora	4–0		2–1	7–0	2–2	1–0	2–0	3–0
Lantana	1–1	0–3		2–0	2–2	3–0	3–1	2–1
Lelle	3–0	0–5	2–1		0–5	1–2	0–1	0–2
Tallinna Sadam	4–1	0–1	1–0	4–1		4–0	3–3	7–1
Narva Trans	1–0	0–5	0–0	0–0	2–4		0–2	2–0
Tulevik	2–0	3–1	3–2	2–1	1–2	2–3		1–2
TVMK	0–2	0–2	1–3	2–1	0–3	2–1	0–0	

Legend: Blue = home team win; Yellow = draw; Red = away team win.

== Championship Tournament ==
The points obtained during the preliminary round were carried over halved and rounded up.

=== League table ===
Pos	Team	Pld	W	D	L	GF	GA	GD	BP	Pts	Qualification
1	Flora (C)	10	7	2	1	34	10	+24	19	42	Qualification for Champions League first qualifying round
2	Tallinna Sadam	10	5	1	4	26	22	+4	16	32	Qualification for UEFA Cup first qualifying round
3	Lantana	10	4	3	3	13	9	+4	10	25	Qualification for Cup Winners' Cup qualifying round
4	Narva Trans	10	5	1	4	14	19	−5	8	24	
5	Tulevik	10	2	3	5	11	15	−4	10	19	Qualification for Intertoto Cup first round
6	TVMK	10	2	0	8	4	23	−19	7	13	

Source: rsssf.com
(C) Champions

=== Results ===
Home \ Away	FLO	LAN	SAD	TRS	TUL	TVM
Flora		2–3	5–0	6–2	0–0	4–0
Lantana	1–3		3–3	0–0	1–1	2–0
Tallinna Sadam	2–5	4–1		5–1	1–3	5–0
Narva Trans	1–4	1–0	2–1		0–2	2–1
Tulevik	1–1	2–3	2–3	0–4		0–1
TVMK	0–4	1–3	0–2	0–1	1–0	

Legend: Blue = home team win; Yellow = draw; Red = away team win.

== Meistriliiga Transition Tournament ==
Eesti Põlevkivi Jõhvi and Lelle, the teams finishing in the last two positions in the preliminary round, faced four best teams of the 1997–98 Esiliiga in the play-off for two places in the 1998 Meistriliiga.

Pos	Team	Pld	W	D	L	GF	GA	GD	Pts	Promotion or relegation
1	Lelle	10	8	2	0	52	10	+42	26	Promotion to Meistriliiga
2	Eesti Põlevkivi Jõhvi	10	5	4	1	23	9	+14	19	Promotion to Meistriliiga
3	Vall	10	4	5	1	14	3	+11	17	Relegation to Esiliiga
4	Dokker	10	2	2	6	11	28	−17	8	Relegation to Esiliiga
5	Olümpia	10	2	1	7	7	10	−3	7	Relegation to Esiliiga
6	Merkuur	10	0	4	6	9	29	−20	4	Relegation to Esiliiga

Source: rsssf.com

== Top scorers ==
Rank	Player	Club	Goals
1	(Estonia) Konstantin Kolbasenko	Tallinna Sadam	18
2	(Estonia) Andres Oper	Flora	15
3	(Estonia) Indrek Zelinski	Flora	13
4	(Norway) Pål Christian Alsaker	Flora	12
5	(Estonia) Toomas Krõm	Flora	13
6	(Estonia) Argo Arbeiter	Tulevik	9
6	(Estonia) Andrei Krõlov	Tallinna Sadam	9
6	(Estonia) Vitali Leitan	Lantana	9
9	(Estonia) Marko Kristal	Flora	8
9	(Russia) Dmitri Lipartov	Narva Trans	8

== See also ==
- 1997 in Estonian football
- 1998 in Estonian football
