= 1993–94 Meistriliiga =

Estonian national championships in football

Meistriliiga
- Season: 1993–94
- Champions: Flora (1st title)
- Relegated: Tervis; Dünamo; Merkuur; Sillamäe Kalev
- UEFA Cup: Flora
- Cup Winners' Cup: Norma
- Top goalscorer: Maksim Gruznov (21)
- Highest scoring: Tevalte 24–0 Sillamäe Kalev

The 1993–94 Meistriliiga was the third season of the Meistriliiga, Estonia's premier football league. Flora won their first title after beating Norma in the title play-off as regular season had ended in a draw.

== League table ==
Pos	Team	Pld	W	D	L	GF	GA	GD	Pts	Qualification or relegation
1	Flora (C)	22	15	6	1	61	9	+52	36 (Note: Champion was decided in a play-off match.)	Qualification for UEFA Cup preliminary round
2	Norma	22	17	2	3	69	11	+58	36	Qualification for Cup Winners' Cup qualifying round
3	Nikol	22	15	3	4	49	19	+30	33	
4	Narva Trans	22	12	6	4	50	16	+34	30	
5	Tallinna Sadam	22	11	3	8	38	26	+12	25	
6	Eesti Põlevkivi Jõhvi	22	9	6	7	39	16	+23	24	
7	EsDAG	22	6	2	14	22	59	−37	14	
8	Tervis (R)	22	5	2	15	18	47	−29	12	Relegation to Esiliiga
9	Dünamo (R)	22	5	2	15	25	54	−29	12	Relegation to Esiliiga
10	Merkuur (R)	22	2	1	19	12	101	−89	5	Relegation to Esiliiga
11	Sillamäe Kalev (Note: Sillamäe Kalev withdrew after 18 matches. The remaining games were awarded to opponents with 0-0.) (R)	22	1	1	20	11	97	−86	3	Relegation to Esiliiga
12	Tevalte (Note: Tevalte were disqualified after 21 matches for alleged corruption. Remaining game was awarded for the opponent with 0-0.)	22	15	4	3	70	9	+61	34	Disqualified

(C) Champions; (R) Relegated

== Title play-off ==
30 June 1994

Flora	5 – 2	Norma
Zelinski 21' 25' 35'; Linnumäe 58'; Kallaste 61'		Saks 55'; Leetma 90'

Kadriorg Stadium
Attendance: 700
Referee: Timo Keltanen

== Results ==
Home \ Away	FLO	NOR	NIK	TEV	DÜN	SAD	DAG	MER	TER	NAR	EPJ	SIL
Flora		1–1	1–0	1–2	5–1	3–0	5–1	4–0	2–0	1–1	0–0	6–0
Norma	0–1		3–0	1–0	2–0	7–0	4–0	7–1	4–0	0–1	1–1	7–0
Nikol	1–1	1–3		2–1	0–2	0–0	4–2	8–1	4–2	2–1	1–0	4–1
Tevalte	0–0	3–1	0–0		2–1	1–0	2–0	10–1	3–0	0–0	0–0	24–0
Dünamo	0–4	1–3	0–4	0–6		1–2	2–4	0–0	2–1	1–6	1–1	3–2
Tallinna Sadam	0–4	0–2	0–1	0–3	4–1		3–0	3–0	2–0	1–0	0–0	3–0
EsDAG	1–4	0–3	0–3	0–1	1–3	0–6		2–1	1–0	2–2	0–5	3–1
Merkuur	0–6	0–5	0–5	0–6	1–5	1–5	1–2		1–2	0–5	0–3	4–1
Tervis	0–6	0–2	0–2	0–2	2–0	0–2	4–0	3–0		2–2	2–5	+:-
Narva Trans	1–1	0–3	0–1	+:-	1–0	2–1	1–1	10–0	3–0		1–0	11–0
Eesti Põlevkivi Jõhvi	0–2	1–2	0–1	1–2	1–0	0–0	3–0	9–0	4–0	0–2		+:-
Sillamäe Kalev	0–3	0–8	1–5	1–2	2–1	0–6	1–2	-:+	0–0	-:+	1–5	

Source: RSSSF – Estonia 1993/94
Legend: Blue = home team win; Yellow = draw; Red = away team win.

== Top scorers ==
Rank	Player	Club	Goals
1	(Estonia) Maksim Gruznov	Trans/Tevalte	27
2	(Estonia) Sergei Bragin	Norma/Tevalte	19
3	(Estonia) Anatoli Novožilov	Tevalte	14
3	(Estonia) Nikolai Toštšev	Trans	14
5	(Estonia) Juri Braiko	Eesti Põlevkivi	10
5	(Estonia) Aleksandr Žurkin	Norma	10
7	(Estonia) Seppo Vilderson	Norma	9
8	(Estonia) Andrei Borissov	Norma/Tevalte	8
8	(Estonia) Urmas Kirs	Flora	8
8	(Estonia) Juri Tšurilkin	Norma	8

== See also ==
- 1993 in Estonian football
- 1994 in Estonian football
- 1993–94 Esiliiga
