= 2003 Esiliiga =

Estonian football league season for second division

Esiliiga
- Season: 2003

The 2003 Esiliiga is the 13th season of the Esiliiga, second-highest Estonian league for association football clubs, since its establishment in 1992.

== Final table of Esiliiga season 2003 ==
Pos	Team	Pld	W	D	L	GF	GA	GD	Pts	Promotion or relegation
1	Lootus (C, P)	28	21	4	3	77	23	+54	67	Promotion to Meistriliiga
2	Tervis	28	16	5	7	69	36	+33	53	Qualification for promotion play-offs
3	M.C.	28	14	8	6	65	47	+18	50	
4	Estel	28	13	5	10	69	45	+24	44	
5	TJK	28	7	10	11	41	57	−16	31	
6	Merkuur (Note: FC Merkuur Tartu deducted 4 points for having licensing problem before the season.) (R)	28	7	8	13	37	66	−29	25	Qualification for relegation play-offs
7	Tammeka (R)	28	3	5	20	44	99	−55	14	Relegation to II Liiga
8	Vaprus (Note: Estonian Football Association License Commission decided to take JK Vaprus Pärnu's license to play in Esiliiga. The club was demoted to 8th spot.) (R)	28	5	7	16	42	71	−29	22	Relegation to II Liiga

Source: rsssf.com
Rules for classification: 1) points; 2) head-to-head points; 3) head-to-head goal difference; 4) head-to-head goals scored; 5) goal difference; 6) number of goals scored.
(C) Champions; (P) Promoted; (R) Relegated

== Promotion playoff ==
12 November 2003

Tervis	2 – 2	Valga
Valejev 24'; Savotškin 28'		Raamat 10'; Tarassenkov 37'

22 November 2003

Valga	3 – 0	Tervis
Antonov 33'; Tarassenkov 43'; Anniste 54'

FC Valga beat JK Tervis Pärnu 5–2 on aggregate. Vaga stayed in Meistriliiga, Tervis in Esiliiga.

== Relegation playoff ==
15 November 2003

TVMK II	3 – 2	Merkuur
Goal		Goal

22 November 2003

Merkuur	0 – 3	TVMK II
		Goal

FC TVMK II Tallinn beat FC Merkuur Tartu 6–2 on aggregate. TVMK II promoted to Esiliiga, Merkuur relegated to Second Division.

== Top goalscorers ==
- 29 – Aleksei Titov (Estel)
- 20 – Kristjan Tiirik (Tammeka)
- 17 – Sergei Popov (Lootus)
- 15 – Nikolai Toštšev (Lootus)
- 13 – Jarmo Ahjupera (Tervis)
- 13 – Sergei Bragin (Estel)
- 12 – Aleksandr Kulik (Tervis)
- 12 – Anton Semjonov (Lootus)
- 11 – Marek Markson (Vaprus)
- 11 – Ott Purje (M.C.)
- 11 – Juri Volkov (TJK)
- 10 – Aleksandr Ivanov (TJK)

== See also ==
- 2003 Meistriliiga
