= Artur Kotenko =

Estonian footballer

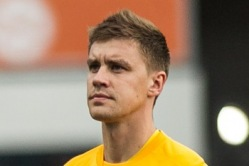

Personal information
- Date of birth: 20 August 1981 (age 45)
- Place of birth: Tallinn, then part of Estonian SSR, Soviet Union
- Height: 1.86 m (6 ft 1 in)
- Position: Goalkeeper

Youth career
- 1992–1993: Puuma

Senior career*
Years	Team	Apps	(Gls)
1998–1999	Vigri	9	(0)
1999	Lantana	10	(0)
2000	Kauhajoen Karhu	9	(0)
2000	Maardu	5	(0)
2001	Levadia Pärnu	5	(0)
2001–2007	Levadia	142	(1)
2008	Sandnes Ulf	27	(0)
2009–2010	Viking	2	(0)
2010–2011	AEP Paphos	7	(0)
2011	Ravan Baku	4	(0)
2012	Jaro	25	(0)
2013	Dnepr Mogilev	23	(0)
2014–2016	Shakhtyor Soligorsk	38	(0)
2017–2018	Narva Trans	64	(0)
2019–2022	FCI Levadia	38	(0)

International career
2004–2020	Estonia	27	(0)
- * Club domestic league appearances and goals as of 31 December 2022

Artur Kotenko (born 20 August 1981) is a retired Estonian professional footballer who last played as a goalkeeper for FCI Levadia.

Kotenko announced his retirement from professional football in November 2022.

== Club career ==
=== Career in Estonia ===
On 24 October 2004, Kotenko scored Levadia's second goal against Tulevik in the penultimate round of 2004 Meistriliiga. The team won the match 4–1 and secured the title, ultimately making it the league winning goal.

Having been frozen out of the Levadia side in 2007, after refusing to sign a contract extension with the club (a similar fate was suffered by teammates Konstantin Vassiljev and Ats Purje earlier that season), Kotenko joined the Norwegian First Division side Sandnes Ulf, but was free to leave the club after less than a year because of a relegation release clause in his contract. In December 2008, Kotenko underwent a successful two-week trial at the English Championship side Nottingham Forest and was expected to join the club in January. The deal, however, fell through when Colin Calderwood was sacked following a Boxing Day defeat to Doncaster Rovers.

=== Viking ===
On 6 February 2009, he joined Eliteserien club Viking. The Estonian goalkeeper made his league debut for the Dark Blues more than eight months after the signing, on 25 October 2009. It ended after just 25 minutes, as he was sent off for handling the ball outside the 18-yard box.

=== AEP Paphos ===
On 10 June 2010, he signed a 1-year deal with Cypriot team AEP Paphos, with an option to extend it by another year, joining compatriot Ats Purje. He failed to make an impact there and only appeared in 7 league matches.

=== Ravan Baku ===
After a spell in Cyprus, Kotenko moved to Azerbaijan and joined a newly promoted Ravan Baku on a two-year contract. He made the debut on 6 August, in a 2–3 defeat against Kapaz. The contract was mutually terminated in October 2011.

=== Jaro ===
On 20 January 2012, Kotenko signed 1-year deal with Finish Veikkausliiga club Jaro.

=== Dnepr Mogilev ===
On 26 February 2013, Kotenko signed a 1-year contract with Belarusian club Dnepr Mogilev. After a successful season in Dnepr Mogilev, Artur Kotenko moved to bronze medalist Shakhtyor Soligorsk.

=== Shakhtyor Soligorsk ===
On 3 May 2014, Kotenko became Belarus Cup winner. His great performance helped Shakhtyor Soligorsk to win bronze medals of Belarus premier league and reach play-off round of Euro League where Shakhtyor Soligorsk lost to PSV Eindhoven. Artur Kotenko have played 29 games in the Belarus premier league and made 17 clean sheets. On 13 December 2014, Artur Kotenko was awarded by Belarus Football Association as a best goalkeeper of Belarus premier league 2014.

=== Back in Estonia ===
On 8 February 2017, Kotenko signed for Estonian top-tier club Narva Trans. After two seasons with Trans Kotenko signed for rival Meistriliiga club FCI Levadia. During his first season in Levadia he was mainly used as a backup for the national team first choice goalkeeper Sergei Lepmets. However, on May 18, 2020, Lepmets unexpectedly announced his decision to retire from professional football, after which Kotenko was placed in charge of first team goalkeeping duties.

== International career ==
He played for Estonia national football team 27 times between 2004 and 2013. His last call-up was in October 2020.

== Honours ==
=== Club ===
Levadia

- Meistriliiga: 2004, 2006, 2007
- Estonian Cup: 2003–04, 2004–05, 2006–07
- Estonian Supercup: 2001

Shakhtyor Soligorsk

- Belarusian Cup: 2013–14

=== Individual ===
- Meistriliiga Player of the Month: May 2017
