= 1996–97 Esiliiga =

Estonian football league season for second division

Esiliiga
- Season: 1996–97
- Champions: JK Dünamo Tallinn
- Promoted: —
- Relegated: JK Tulevik Viljandi; FC Norma Tallinn
- Top goalscorer: Igor Bratšuk (8)

The 1996–97 Esiliiga is the sixth season of the Esiliiga, second-highest Estonian league for association football clubs, since its establishment in 1992.

== Main tournament ==
Played in fall 1996.

Four best teams qualify to the Premier Division promotion play-off, other four to First Division promotion play-off.

=== Table ===
Pos	Team	Pld	W	D	L	GF	GA	GD	Pts
1	JK Dünamo Tallinn (Note: Dünamo withdrew from the Premier Division promotion play-off because of financial problems. FC Lelle replaced Dünamo.)	14	9	2	3	22	13	+9	29
2	Tallinna Jalgpallikool	14	7	4	3	23	12	+11	25
3	Pärnu JK	14	7	2	5	27	20	+7	23
4	JK Kalev Sillamäe	14	7	2	5	21	13	+8	23
5	JK Tulevik Viljandi	14	6	2	6	16	22	−6	20
6	FC Lelle	13	5	3	5	23	13	+10	18
7	Olümp Maardu	14	3	4	7	23	40	−17	13
8	FC Norma Tallinn	14	2	1	11	17	39	−22	7

=== Top scorers ===
Pos	Name	Team	Gls
1	Igor Bratšuk	Olümp Maardu	8
2	Deniss Jeršov	FC Norma Tallinn	7
3	Nikolai Prohhorov	FC Norma Tallinn	5
3	Vassili Pogorelov	Olümp Maardu	5
3	Juri Naloitšenko	JK Dünamo Tallinn	5
3	Svajūnas Raučkis	FC Lelle	5
3	Vladimir Semjonov	Tallinna Jalgpallikool	5

== Premier Division promotion play-off ==
Played in spring 1997.

None of the four teams were able to finish above the two teams from Premier Division, so they all remain in the First Division for the upcoming season.

=== Table ===
Pos	Team	Pld	W	D	L	GF	GA	GD	Pts
1	Eesti Põlevkivi Jõhvi	10	8	1	1	28	5	+23	25
2	JK Vall Tallinn	10	7	1	2	29	15	+14	22
3	Pärnu JK	10	4	1	5	9	27	−18	13
4	FC Lelle	10	4	0	6	22	18	+4	12
5	Tallinna Jalgpallikool	10	2	2	6	11	19	−8	8
6	JK Kalev Sillamäe	10	1	3	6	6	21	−15	6

=== Top scorers ===
Pos	Name	Team	Gls
1	Aleksei Titov	JK Vall Tallinn	8
2	Sergei Melnikov	Eesti Põlevkivi Jõhvi	7
3	Svajūnas Raučkis	FC Lelle	6
3	Andrei Frolov	Eesti Põlevkivi Jõhvi	6
3	Andrei Afanassov	JK Vall Tallinn	6
6	Tarmo Saks	FC Lelle	5
6	Vitali Leitan	JK Vall Tallinn	5

== First Division promotion play-off ==
Played in spring 1997.

JK Merkuur Tartu and JK Dokker Tallinn promoted from Second Division, while JK Tulevik Viljandi and FC Norma Tallinn were relegated.

=== Table ===
Pos	Team	Pld	W	D	L	GF	GA	GD	Pts
1	JK Merkuur Tartu (P)	14	9	2	3	35	17	+18	29
2	Olümp Maardu	14	9	1	4	26	14	+12	28
3	JK Dokker Tallinn (P)	14	9	1	4	25	20	+5	28
4	JK Dünamo Tallinn	14	8	2	4	21	15	+6	26
5	Tartu Jalgpallikool	14	5	6	3	25	2	+23	21
6	Eliit Kohtla-Järve	14	3	3	8	13	24	−11	12
7	JK Tulevik Viljandi (R)	14	3	1	10	16	31	−15	10
8	FC Norma Tallinn (R)	14	1	2	11	6	24	−18	5

(P) Promoted; (R) Relegated

== See also ==
- 1996–97 Meistriliiga
- 1996 in Estonian football
- 1997 in Estonian football
