= Kaimar Saag =

Estonian footballer (born 1988)

Personal information
- Full name: Kaimar Saag
- Date of birth: 5 August 1988 (age 38)
- Place of birth: Viljandi, then part of Estonian SSR, Soviet Union
- Height: 1.80 m (5 ft 11 in)
- Position: Striker

Team information
- Current team: Viljandi JK Tulevik
- Number: 27

Youth career
- –2005: Viljandi SK
- 2005: Levadia

Senior career*
Years	Team	Apps	(Gls)
2004	Suure-Jaani Kirm	17	(26)
2005	Viljandi Kodugaas	9	(2)
2005–2007	Levadia	18	(4)
2005–2007	→ Levadia II (reserves)	41	(50)
2007	→ Tallinna Kalev (loan)	14	(1)
2008–2012	Silkeborg	84	(14)
2012–2014	Vejle Kolding	24	(6)
2014	Assyriska	5	(0)
2015	Levadia	28	(5)
2016–2018	Nybergsund-Trysil	50	(26)
2018	B36 Tórshavn	27	(11)
2019–2021	Viljandi Tulevik	88	(28)
2022-2023	Paide Linnameeskond	56	(10)
2024-	Viljandi JK Tulevik	94	(51)
Total		436	(190)

International career
2009–2010	Estonia U21	9	(4)
2007–2014	Estonia	46	(3)
- * Club domestic league appearances and goals as of 17 November 2026

Kaimar Saag (born 5 August 1988) is an Estonian professional footballer who plays as a striker for Viljandi JK Tulevik.

== Club career ==
=== Levadia ===
At the age of 16, Saag started his professional career with Levadia. He scored his first Meistriliiga goal on 16 October 2005, in the 28th minute of a 2–3 victory over Merkuur. In 2007 Meistriliiga season, he had a short loan with Tallinna Kalev where he scored once in 14 games. At the age of 19, after three seasons in Levadia, Saag moved abroad.

=== Silkeborg ===
On 25 January 2008, he signed a 4-year contract with Danish 1st Division club Silkeborg. Seven days later, Saag played his first game for Silkeborg against Aarhus. He scored his first goal for Silkeborg on 6 April 2008, in a 2–1 victory against Fredericia. In April 2012, after spending four and a half years at the club, he announced his intention to leave the club due to limited play time.

=== Vejle Kolding ===
In May 2012, Saag signed a two-year contract with Danish side Vejle Kolding and joined the team later in the summer after his contract expired at Silkeborg. He started well at his new club, scoring seven goals in pre-season matches. On 29 July 2012, he made his league debut for the club in a 1–1 draw against Køge. A week later on his birthday, 5 August, Saag scored a hat-trick and helped his side beat Skive 4–1.

=== Assyriska ===
In July 2014, Saag signed a one-year contract with Swedish Superettan club.

=== B36 Tórshavn ===
In January 2018, Saag moved to Faroe Islands' club B36 Tórshavn. Saag left the club again at the end of 2018 and then went to train at his former youth club Viljandi SK, just to hold his form.

== International career ==
For Estonia national football team, Saag is capped 46 times. He made his national team debut on 8 September 2007 against Croatia national football team in a UEFA Euro 2008 qualification.

He scored his first goal for the national team on 30 December 2009, in a friendly match against Angola.

=== International goals ===
#	Date	Venue	Opponent	Score	Result	Competition
1	30 December 2009	Estadio Algarve, Faro, Portugal	Angola	1–0	1–0	Friendly
2	11 August 2010	Lilleküla Stadium, Tallinn, Estonia	Faroe Islands	1–1	2–1	UEFA Euro 2012 qualifying
3	6 September 2011	Lilleküla Stadium, Tallinn, Estonia	Northern Ireland	4–1	4–1	UEFA Euro 2012 qualifying
Correct as of 13 January 2017

== Honours ==
=== Club ===
Levadia

- Meistriliiga: 2006, 2007
- Estonian Cup: 2004–05, 2006–07
- Estonian Supercup: 2015

B36 Tórshavn

- Faroe Islands Cup: 2018

=== Individual ===
- Esiliiga top goalscorer: 2006
