= 2015 Esiliiga =

Estonian football league season for second division

Esiliiga
- Season: 2015
- Champions: Flora II (2nd title)
- Promoted: Tarvas
- Relegated: Vaprus; Kuressaare
- Matches: 180
- Goals: 658 (3.66 per match)
- Top goalscorer: Eduard Golovljov (41 goals)
- Biggest home win: Levadia II 13–1 Kuressaare (20 September 2015)
- Biggest away win: Vaprus 0–9 Infonet II (20 September 2015)
- Highest scoring: Levadia II 13–1 Kuressaare (20 September 2015)
- Longest winning run: 10 games Levadia II
- Longest unbeaten run: 12 games Levadia II
- Longest winless run: 9 games Tallinna Kalev
- Longest losing run: 6 games Santos; Tallinna Kalev

The 2015 Esiliiga was the 25th season of the Esiliiga, second-highest Estonian league for association football clubs, since its establishment in 1992. The season started on 8 March 2015 and concluded on 8 November 2015.

Flora II won the league on the last day of the season, finishing with 72 points. It was their second league title.

Tarvas finished 4th and were promoted to the Meistriliiga for the first time in their history. Tallinna Kalev finished 6th and qualified to the promotion play-offs but were beaten by Tammeka 2–4 on aggregate.

Santos finished 8th but avoided the relegation play-offs after Sillamäe Kalev II withdrew. Vaprus and Kuressaare were the bottom two teams and were relegated to the Esiliiga B.

== Teams ==
Locations of the 2015 Esiliiga teams

=== Stadia ===
Team	Location	Stadium	Capacity
Flora II	Tallinn	A. Le Coq Arena	10,340
Infonet II	Tallinn	Lasnamäe KJH Stadium	400
Irbis	Kiviõli	Kiviõli Stadium	180
Kuressaare	Kuressaare	Kuressaare linnastaadion	1,000
Levadia II	Tallinn	Maarjamäe Stadium	30
Nõmme Kalju II	Tallinn	Hiiu Stadium	330
Santos	Tartu	Tamme Stadium	1,750
Tallinna Kalev	Tallinn	Kalev Central Stadium	11,500
Tarvas	Rakvere	Rakvere linnastaadion	1,785
Vaprus	Vändra	Vändra Stadium	307

=== Personnel and kits ===
Team	Manager	Captain	Kit manufacturer	Shirt sponsor
Flora II	(Estonia) Jürgen Henn	(Estonia) Sten Sinisalu	Nike	Tele2
Infonet II	(Estonia) Sergei Bragin	(Estonia) Jevgeni Gurtšioglujants	Joma	Infonet
Irbis	(Estonia) Erik Šteinberg	(Estonia) Sergei Kostin	Adidas	
Kuressaare	(Estonia) Pelle Pohlak	(Estonia) Sander Viira	Joma	Saaremaa Lihatööstus
Levadia II	(Estonia) Argo Arbeiter	(Estonia) Kaspar Mutso	Adidas	Viimsi Keevitus
Nõmme Kalju II	(Estonia) Zaur Tšilingarašvili		Adidas	Optibet
Santos	(Estonia) Siim Säesk	(Estonia) Taavi Vellemaa	Uhlsport	Värska
Tallinna Kalev	(Estonia) Marko Pärnpuu	(Estonia) Ando Hausenberg	Jako	
Tarvas	(Estonia) Valeri Bondarenko	(Estonia) Kaarel Saar	Joma	Aqva
Vaprus	(Estonia) Ranet Lepik	(Estonia) Karel Otto	Macron	Møller Auto Pärnu

=== Managerial changes ===
Team	Outgoing manager	Manner of departure	Date of vacancy	Position in table	Incoming manager	Date of appointment
Tallinna Kalev	(Estonia) Sergei Zamogilnõi	Contract expired	8 November 2014	Pre-season	(Estonia) Marko Pärnpuu	25 November 2014
Santos	(Lithuania) Algimantas Liubinskas	Contract expired	31 December 2014	Pre-season	(Estonia) Siim Säesk	1 January 2015

== Results ==
=== League table ===
Pos	Team	Pld	W	D	L	GF	GA	GD	Pts	Promotion, qualification or relegation
1	Flora II (Note: Reserve teams are ineligible for promotion.) (C)	36	22	6	8	76	40	+36	72	
2	Levadia II	36	22	5	9	118	57	+61	71	
3	Infonet II	36	20	6	10	108	48	+60	66	
4	Tarvas (P)	36	12	11	13	52	53	−1	47	Promotion to Meistriliiga
5	Tallinna Kalev	36	13	7	16	47	59	−12	46	Qualification for the promotion play-offs
6	Nõmme Kalju II	36	14	4	18	50	56	−6	46	
7	Irbis	36	13	5	18	60	87	−27	44	
8	Santos (O)	36	12	6	18	56	83	−27	42	Qualification for the relegation play-offs
9	Vaprus (R)	36	11	5	20	43	80	−37	38	Relegation to Esiliiga B
10	Kuressaare (R)	36	10	7	19	48	95	−47	37	Relegation to Esiliiga B

Source: Estonian Football Association (in Estonian)
Rules for classification: 1) Points; 2) Play-off (only if deciding champion); 3) Less matches awarded against; 4) Matches won; 5) Head-to-head points; 6) Head-to-head goal difference; 7) Goal difference; 8) Goals scored; 9) Away goals scored; 10) Fairplay ranking.
(C) Champions; (O) Play-off winners; (P) Promoted; (R) Relegated

=== Result tables ===
==== First half of the season ====
Home \ Away	FLO	INF	IRB	KUR	LEV	NÕM	SAN	TAL	TAR	VAP
Flora II		3–1	1–1	1–0	3–2	3–1	4–0	1–3	3–3	3–0
Infonet II	3–1		5–0	3–1	3–0	2–0	1–2	1–0	1–1	2–1
Irbis	1–1	4–2		3–1	0–5	0–0	7–3	4–1	0–2	0–3
Kuressaare	3–0	4–4	1–3		2–0	1–0	2–2	1–0	0–0	4–0
Levadia II	0–0	2–2	6–1	3–3		3–0	5–0	8–3	2–0	4–3
Nõmme Kalju II	0–1	0–3	4–0	0–1	1–2		0–4	0–2	1–0	1–2
Santos	2–0	2–3	0–2	1–2	2–5	1–2		3–1	5–1	1–0
Tallinna Kalev	1–0	0–2	3–0	3–0	3–2	1–3	2–2		0–0	2–1
Tarvas	3–4	0–0	5–1	3–1	4–3	2–0	1–1	1–2		0–2
Vaprus	0–4	1–0	0–2	5–0	2–4	0–5	1–3	1–1	2–1	

Updated to match(es) played on 8 November 2015. Source: Esiliiga
Legend: Blue = home team win; Yellow = draw; Red = away team win.

==== Second half of the season ====
Home \ Away	FLO	INF	IRB	KUR	LEV	NÕM	SAN	TAL	TAR	VAP
Flora II		3–1	3–1	6–0	1–0	2–1	6–0	4–1	1–1	0–1
Infonet II	2–3		12–1	10–1	3–4	3–3	0–1	4–1	5–1	5–2
Irbis	3–1	1–4		4–2	3–4	0–1	2–3	1–0	3–0	5–1
Kuressaare	0–3	2–1	0–1		3–6	2–3	1–3	1–1	0–1	2–2
Levadia II	0–2	1–0	1–1	13–1		5–1	7–0	5–1	3–0	6–3
Nõmme Kalju II	1–2	0–3	4–2	2–0	1–0		2–0	0–1	1–1	1–3
Santos	2–5	0–4	5–1	0–2	1–1	1–2		1–3	2–2	2–1
Tallinna Kalev	0–1	2–2	2–1	1–2	0–1	2–2	2–0		0–2	0–1
Tarvas	2–0	0–2	1–1	6–1	3–1	1–2	3–1	0–0		1–0
Vaprus	0–0	0–9	0–0 (Note: FA awarded Vaprus a win after Irbis forfeited the match.)	1–1	1–4	0–5	0–0	1–2	2–0	

Source: Esiliiga
Legend: Blue = home team win; Yellow = draw; Red = away team win.

== Play-offs ==
=== Promotion play-offs ===
Tallinna Kalev, who finished 6th, faced Tammeka, the 9th-placed 2015 Meistriliiga side for a two-legged play-off. The winner on aggregate score after both matches earned entry into the 2016 Meistriliiga. Tammeka won 4–2 on aggregate.

==== First leg ====
18 November 2015
19:00 (GMT+2)

Tammeka	4–1	Tallinna Kalev
Kiidron 55'; Tiirik 59'; Hurt 64'; Paju 89'	Report	Larin 54'

Tamme Stadium, Tartu
Attendance: 151
Referee: Kristo Tohver

==== Second leg ====
21 November 2015
13:00 (GMT+2)

Tallinna Kalev	1–0	Tammeka
Wahl 50'	Report

Kalev Central Stadium, Tallinn
Attendance: 54
Referee: Eiko Saar

=== Relegation play-offs ===
Santos, who finished 8th, were supposed to face Sillamäe Kalev II, the 3rd-placed 2015 Esiliiga B side for a two-legged play-off. However, the play-offs were abandoned after Sillamäe Kalev II withdrew and Santos retained their Esiliiga spot for the 2016 season.

== Season statistics ==
=== Top scorers ===
Rank	Player	Club	Goals
1	(Estonia) Eduard Golovljov	Infonet II	41
2	(Estonia) Mark Oliver Roosnupp	Levadia II	21
2	(Estonia) Juhan Jograf Siim	Flora II	21
4	(Estonia) Nikita Koger	Levadia II	19
4	(Estonia) Henry Rohtla	Levadia II	19
6	(Estonia) Sergei Akimov	Tarvas	16
6	(Estonia) Vitali Gussev	Irbis	16
8	(Estonia) Sander Laht	Kuressaare	14
8	(Estonia) Aleksei Mamontov	Irbis	14
10	(Estonia) Jevgeni Gurtšioglujants	Infonet II	13
10	(Estonia) Silver Alex Kelder	Tallinna Kalev	13

== Awards ==
=== Monthly awards ===
Month	Manager of the Month		Player of the Month	
Month	Manager	Club	Player	Club
March	(Estonia) Argo Arbeiter	Levadia II	(Estonia) Joonas Ljaš	Tarvas
April	(Estonia) Marko Pärnpuu	Tallinna Kalev	(Estonia) Sergei Akimov	Tarvas
May	(Estonia) Erik Šteinberg	Irbis	(Estonia) Mark Oliver Roosnupp	Levadia II
June	(Estonia) Pelle Pohlak	Kuressaare	(Estonia) Hans Naano	Vaprus
July	(Estonia) Marko Pärnpuu	Tallinna Kalev	(Estonia) Herol Riiberg	Flora II
August	(Estonia) Argo Arbeiter	Levadia II	(Estonia) Eduard Golovljov	Infonet II
September	(Estonia) Argo Arbeiter	Levadia II	(Estonia) Taavi Vellemaa	Santos
October	(Estonia) Jürgen Henn	Flora II	(Estonia) Karel Otto	Vaprus

=== Annual awards ===
==== Player of the Season ====
Eduard Golovljov was named Player of the Season.

== See also ==
- 2014–15 Estonian Cup
- 2015–16 Estonian Cup
- 2015 Meistriliiga
- 2015 Esiliiga B
