= 1992 Esiliiga =

Estonian football league season for second division

Esiliiga
- Season: 1992
- Champions: Kreenholm Narva
- Promoted: –
- Relegated: –

The 1992 season in the first division of Estonian football, named Esiliiga, was the first domestic competition since the Baltic nation gained independence from the Soviet Union in 1991. Eight teams competed in this edition, played in the spring, with Kreenholm Narva winning the title.

== Final Round I ==
Pos	Team	Pld	W	D	L	GF	GA	GD	Pts
1	Kreenholm Narva	6	3	1	2	13	9	+4	7
2	Tempo Tallinn	6	3	0	3	16	14	+2	6
3	Lokomotiiv Valga	6	2	1	3	11	17	−6	5
4	Metallist Tallinn	6	2	0	4	13	15	−2	4

== Final Round II ==
Pos	Team	Pld	W	D	L	GF	GA	GD	Pts
5	Peipsi Kalur Kallaste	6	3	1	2	13	10	+3	7
6	KEK Pärnu	6	2	2	2	13	12	+1	6
7	Lokomotiiv Valga	6	2	2	2	7	9	−2	6
8	KEK Paide	6	1	3	2	8	10	−2	5

== See also ==
- 1992 in Estonian football
- 1992 Meistriliiga
