= 2004 Meistriliiga =

Estonian national championships in football

Meistriliiga
- Season: 2004
- Champions: Levadia (3rd title)
- Top goalscorer: Vjatšeslav Zahovaiko (28)

2004 Meistriliiga was the 14th season of the Meistriliiga, Estonia's premier football league. Levadia won their third title.

== Season overview ==
Levadia Tallinn won their third title with a six-point advantage over the runners-up TVMK Tallinn. Tammeka Tartu and Tervis Pärnu won promotion to the Meistriliiga as the Esiliiga champions and third placed team respectively, the runners-up Levadia Tallinn II were ineligible for promotion. Expansion of the league to ten teams from eight, for the upcoming season, also ensured that even the last placed Lootus Alutaguse had a chance to stay in the top flight, but were defeated by Esiliiga's fourth team Dünamo Tallinn, winning the away leg 2–1, but then losing at home 0-4 a week later. Tervis Pärnu were later denied the Meistriliiga license, sealing an unlikely promotion for the fifth-placed FC Kuressaare.

== League table ==
Pos	Team	Pld	W	D	L	GF	GA	GD	Pts	Qualification or relegation
1	Levadia (C)	28	21	6	1	82	14	+68	69	Qualification for Champions League first qualifying round
2	TVMK	28	19	6	3	89	29	+60	63	Qualification for UEFA Cup first qualifying round
3	Flora	28	18	4	6	83	25	+58	58	Qualification for UEFA Cup first qualifying round
4	Narva Trans	28	15	2	11	43	39	+4	47	Qualification for Intertoto Cup first round
5	Merkuur	28	10	5	13	47	58	−11	35	
6	Tulevik	28	6	7	15	30	53	−23	25	
7	Valga	28	5	2	21	30	80	−50	17	
8	Alutaguse Lootus (R)	28	1	2	25	11	117	−106	5	Qualification for relegation play-offs

Source: Estonian Football Association (in Estonian)
Rules for classification: 1) points; 2) number of wins; 3) head-to-head points; 4) head-to-head goal difference; 5) head-to-head goals scored; 6) goal difference; 7) number of goals scored.
(C) Champions; (R) Relegated

=== Relegation play-off ===
13 November 2004

Tallinna Dünamo	1–2	Alutaguse Lootus
Butajev 44'		Popov 30'; Ametov 90+3'

20 November 2004

Alutaguse Lootus	0–4	Tallinna Dünamo
		Tšernoussov 8'; Krivošein 32'; Butajev 65'; Semko 76'

Tallinna Dünamo won 5-2 on aggregate and were promoted for the 2005 Meistriliiga. Alutaguse Lootus were relegated to the 2005 Esiliiga.

== Results ==
Each team played every opponent four times, twice at home and twice on the road, for a total of 36 games.

=== First half of season ===
Home \ Away	LOO	FLO	LEV	MER	TRS	TUL	TVM	VAL
Alutaguse Lootus		1–8	0–5	1–2	2–6	0–1	0–2	0–2
Flora	6–0		0–2	3–0	2–0	0–1	2–2	1–0
Levadia	4–0	2–2		6–0	2–0	6–1	3–0	3–0
Merkuur	1–1	0–1	1–3		0–2	2–1	0–2	4–0
Narva Trans	1–0	0–2	1–1	1–2		1–0	1–4	2–1
Tulevik	0–0	1–5	0–1	1–4	0–3		0–3	2–0
TVMK	5–0	1–4	0–0	1–3	2–0	3–1		3–1
Valga	0–1	0–6	1–5	2–0	0–2	3–3	2–5	

Legend: Blue = home team win; Yellow = draw; Red = away team win.

=== Second half of season ===
Home \ Away	LOO	FLO	LEV	MER	TRS	TUL	TVM	VAL
Alutaguse Lootus		0–6	0–3	1–3	0–3	1–3	1–10	0–2
Flora	9–0		0–2	3–0	1–3	4–0	2–3	2–0
Levadia	7–0	2–0		0–0	0–1	1–0	0–0	3–0
Merkuur	4–1	3–5	2–5		2–1	0–0	1–5	1–2
Narva Trans	1–0	0–2	0–6	2–2		2–0	2–3	3–1
Tulevik	5–0	0–0	1–4	2–2	1–2		1–1	2–1
TVMK	13–0	1–1	2–2	5–1	2–0	2–1		4–0
Valga	5–1	1–6	2–4	1–7	1–3	2–2	0–5	

Legend: Blue = home team win; Yellow = draw; Red = away team win.

== Top scorers ==
Rank	Player	Club	Goals
1	(Estonia) Vjatšeslav Zahovaiko	Flora	28
2	(Estonia) Ingemar Teever	TVMK	18
3	(Lithuania) Egidijus Juška	TVMK	16
4	(Estonia) Andrei Antonov	Valga	13
4	(Estonia) Tarmo Neemelo	TVMK	13
6	(Estonia) Deniss Malov	TVMK	11
6	(Estonia) Konstantin Nahk	Levadia	11
6	(Estonia) Anton Sereda	Merkuur Tartu	11
6	(Estonia) Dmitri Ustritski	Tulevik	11
10	(Estonia) Argo Arbeiter	Levadia	9
10	(Lithuania) Marius Dovydėnas	Levadia	9
10	(Estonia) Maksim Gruznov	Narva Trans	9
10	(Estonia) Konstantin Vassiljev	Levadia	9
10	(Estonia) Vladimir Voskoboinikov	Levadia	9
10	(Estonia) Kristen Viikmäe	Flora	9

== See also ==
- 2003–04 Estonian Cup
- 2004–05 Estonian Cup
- 2004 Esiliiga
