= 1992–93 Esiliiga =

Estonian football league season for second division

Esiliiga
- Season: 1992–93
- Promoted: JK Tervis Pärnu; Tallinna Sadam JK
- Relegated: none

The 1992–93 Esiliiga is the second season of the Esiliiga, second-highest Estonian league for association football clubs, since its establishment in 1992.

== Final table ==
Pos	Team	Pld	W	D	L	GF	GA	GD	Pts	Promotion
1	Tervis (P)	16	13	0	3	77	15	+62	26	Promotion to Meistriliiga
2	Tallinna Sadam (P)	16	12	2	2	52	14	+38	26	Promotion to Meistriliiga
3	Kreenholm	16	8	1	7	32	46	−14	17	
4	Järvamaa	16	7	2	7	42	39	+3	16	
5	Pena	16	6	4	6	46	35	+11	16	
6	Olümp	16	6	2	8	24	40	−16	14	
7	Irbis	16	6	1	9	30	46	−16	13	
8	Lokomotiiv	16	5	1	10	26	52	−26	11	
9	Peipsi Kalur	16	2	1	13	13	56	−43	5	

Source: rsssf.com
Rules for classification: 1. points; 2. goal difference; 3. number of goals scored.
(P) Promoted

== See also ==
- 1992–93 Meistriliiga
- 1992 in Estonian football
- 1993 in Estonian football
