= 2005 Meistriliiga =

Estonian national championships in football

Meistriliiga
- Season: 2005
- Champions: TVMK (1st title)
- Top goalscorer: Tarmo Neemelo (41)

2005 Meistriliiga was the 15th season of the Meistriliiga, Estonia's premier football league. TVMK won their first title.

== Season overview ==
FC TVMK's first title-winning Meistriliiga campaign came in some style with strikers Tarmo Neemelo and Ingemar Teever scoring most of the goals and veteran midfielder Andrei Borissov leading the team from midfield. Narva Trans finished in bronze-medal position after years of being fourth in the final table, while FC Flora have been busy rebuilding their squad and therefore not too upset by a disappointing fourth position finish. FC Kuressaare went out of the league via play-offs and Dünamo's defensive displays were awful and the team never seemed to have any kind of chance in staying up.

Tarmo Neemelo in the end scored 41 goals for the champions, and earned a move to top Swedish club Helsingborgs IF, Maksim Gruznov of Narva Trans scored 26 goals, Vjatšeslav Zahovaiko of FC Flora and Ingemar Teever for the champions scored 19 goals each. The latter secured a free transfer to Swedish outfit Östers IF.

== League table ==
| Pos | Team | Pld | W | D | L | GF | GA | GD | Pts | Qualification or relegation |
|---|---|---|---|---|---|---|---|---|---|---|
| 1 | TVMK (C) | 36 | 30 | 5 | 1 | 138 | 21 | +117 | 95 | Qualification for Champions League first qualifying round |
| 2 | Levadia | 36 | 28 | 5 | 3 | 97 | 25 | +72 | 89 | Qualification for UEFA Cup first qualifying round (Note: Flora qualified as Estonian Cup finalists) |
| 3 | Narva Trans | 36 | 23 | 6 | 7 | 99 | 34 | +65 | 75 | Qualification for Intertoto Cup first round |
| 4 | Flora | 36 | 21 | 6 | 9 | 81 | 36 | +45 | 69 | Qualification for UEFA Cup first qualifying round |
| 5 | Tulevik | 36 | 12 | 11 | 13 | 46 | 48 | −2 | 47 | |
| 6 | Merkuur | 36 | 11 | 7 | 18 | 52 | 86 | −34 | 40 | |
| 7 | Tammeka | 36 | 8 | 5 | 23 | 50 | 88 | −38 | 29 | |
| 8 | Valga | 36 | 8 | 4 | 24 | 38 | 78 | −40 | 28 | |
| 9 | Kuressaare | 36 | 7 | 6 | 23 | 40 | 96 | −56 | 27 | Qualification for relegation play-offs |
| 10 | Dünamo (R) | 36 | 3 | 3 | 30 | 28 | 157 | −129 | 12 | Relegation to Esiliiga |

Source: Estonian Football Association (in Estonian)
Rules for classification: 1) points; 2) number of wins; 3) head-to-head points; 4) head-to-head goal difference; 5) head-to-head goals scored; 6) goal difference; 7) number of goals scored.
(C) Champions; (R) Relegated

=== Relegation play-off ===
13 November 2005

| Lasnamäe Ajax | 1–0 | Kuressaare |
|---|---|---|
| Rõtškov 49' |

19 November 2005

| Kuressaare | 2–1 | Lasnamäe Ajax |
|---|---|---|
| Kluge 11'; Pukk 90+1' | | Andrejev 46' |

2–2 on aggregate. Lasnamäe Ajax won on away goals.

Kuressaare kept their place in the Meistriliiga, after Pärnu Tervis decided not to make the promotion.

== Results ==
Each team played every opponent four times, twice at home and twice on the road, for a total of 36 games.

=== First half of season ===
| Home \ Away | DÜN | FLO | KUR | LEV | MER | TRS | TAM | TUL | TVM | VAL |
|---|---|---|---|---|---|---|---|---|---|---|
| Dünamo | | 0–3 | 1–0 | 0–4 | 1–6 | 0–6 | 2–7 | 0–0 | 0–7 | 1–1 |
| Flora | 3–1 | | 6–0 | 0–2 | 0–0 | 2–1 | 3–0 | 3–0 | 0–1 | 2–0 |
| Kuressaare | 2–0 | 1–3 | | 0–2 | 1–2 | 1–3 | 1–0 | 1–1 | 1–6 | 0–0 |
| Levadia | 5–0 | 0–2 | 4–0 | | 4–0 | 3–0 | 5–2 | 2–0 | 2–1 | 3–0 |
| Merkuur | 3–1 | 1–1 | 5–0 | 2–2 | | 2–3 | 0–1 | 2–0 | 1–6 | 2–1 |
| Narva Trans | 7–3 | 2–2 | 4–1 | 3–1 | 6–2 | | 5–1 | 1–2 | 0–3 | 3–1 |
| Tammeka | 9–0 | 0–2 | 2–2 | 0–2 | 2–2 | 0–3 | | 2–2 | 0–3 | 3–4 |
| Tulevik | 4–1 | 3–2 | 1–0 | 2–2 | 5–0 (Note: The game result was cancelled - Merkuur used disqualified player Vjatšeslav Lütter.) | 0–2 | 1–1 | | 0–2 | 0–2 |
| TVMK | 5–1 | 3–2 | 3–1 | 2–2 | 2–1 | 0–0 | 9–0 | 2–0 | | 5–0 |
| Valga | 2–1 | 0–4 | 0–1 | 0–3 | 1–1 | 1–2 | 1–0 | 1–2 | 0–5 | |

Legend: Blue = home team win; Yellow = draw; Red = away team win.

=== Second half of season ===
| Home \ Away | DÜN | FLO | KUR | LEV | MER | TRS | TAM | TUL | TVM | VAL |
|---|---|---|---|---|---|---|---|---|---|---|
| Dünamo | | 0–2 | 3–4 | 0–4 | 2–1 | 0–5 | 1–2 | 2–0 | 0–12 | 3–6 |
| Flora | 7–0 | | 7–0 | 1–3 | 1–0 | 0–0 | 3–1 | 2–1 | 1–3 | 1–0 |
| Kuressaare | 8–1 | 1–1 | | 1–3 | 1–1 | 2–5 | 2–1 | 1–1 | 1–8 | 0–3 |
| Levadia | 3–1 | 2–0 | 2–0 | | 8–0 | 1–1 | 1–0 | 2–1 | 1–2 | 3–0 |
| Merkuur | 4–0 | 0–6 | 2–0 | 2–3 | | 0–7 | 3–0 | 2–1 | 1–3 | 2–1 |
| Narva Trans | 7–0 | 2–0 | 3–0 | 0–4 | 4–0 | | 6–0 | -:+ (Note: The result of the game (5–0 for Trans) is cancelled - Narva Trans used disqualified player Aleksandr Kulatšenko.) | 0–2 | 3–0 |
| Tammeka | 3–0 | 1–3 | 3–0 | 1–2 | 2–0 | 0–3 | | 2–4 | 0–2 | 2–1 |
| Tulevik | 1–1 | 1–1 | 1–0 | 1–3 | 0–0 | 0–0 | 3–1 | | 0–3 | 2–0 |
| TVMK | 9–1 | 4–2 | 6–1 | 0–0 | 8–1 | 0–0 | 5–0 | 1–1 | | 3–0 (Note: The game result was cancelled - Valga used disqualified player Norman Kägo.) |
| Valga | 5–0 | 1–3 | 2–4 | 0–4 | 2–1 | 0–2 | 1–1 | 1–5 | 0–1 | |

Legend: Blue = home team win; Yellow = draw; Red = away team win.

== Season statistics ==
=== Top scorers ===
| Rank | Player | Club | Goals |
|---|---|---|---|
| 1 | (Estonia) Tarmo Neemelo | TVMK | 41 |
| 2 | (Estonia) Maksim Gruznov | Narva Trans | 26 |
| 3 | (Estonia) Ingemar Teever | TVMK | 19 |
| 3 | (Estonia) Vjatšeslav Zahovaiko | Flora | 19 |
| 5 | (Estonia) Indrek Zelinski | Levadia | 18 |
| 6 | (Lithuania) Egidijus Juška | TVMK | 17 |
| 7 | (Estonia) Vitali Leitan | Levadia | 16 |
| 8 | (Estonia) Kristjan Tiirik | Tammeka Tartu | 15 |
| 9 | (Estonia) Anton Sereda | Merkuur Tartu | 14 |
| 10 | (Estonia) Dmitri Ustritski | Tulevik | 13 |

== See also ==
- 2004–05 Estonian Cup
- 2005–06 Estonian Cup
- 2005 Esiliiga
