= Gruznov =

Gruznov (Russian: Грузнов) is a Russian masculine surname, its feminine counterpart is Gruznova. It may refer to

- Maksim Gruznov (b. 1974) is a retired Estonian football striker.
