= 2001 Esiliiga =

Estonian football league season for second division

Esiliiga
- Season: 2001

The 2001 Esiliiga is the 11th season of the Esiliiga, second-highest Estonian league for association football clubs, since its establishment in 1992.

== Final table of Esiliiga season 2001 ==
Pos	Team	Pld	W	D	L	GF	GA	GD	Pts	Promotion or relegation
1	Levadia Pärnu (P)	28	15	7	6	67	39	+28	52	Promotion to Meistriliiga
2	Valga	28	16	3	9	61	38	+23	51	Qualification for promotion play-offs
3	S.C. Real	28	14	5	9	65	47	+18	47	
4	Merkuur	28	14	4	10	57	35	+22	46	
5	Elva	28	12	6	10	64	33	+31	42	
6	Emmaste (R)	28	12	4	12	43	50	−7	40	Qualification for relegation play-offs
7	Sillamäe Kalev (R)	28	12	3	13	59	53	+6	39	Relegation to II Liiga
8	Tervis (R)	28	1	0	27	25	146	−121	3	Relegation to II Liiga

Source: rsssf.com
Rules for classification: 1) points; 2) head-to-head points; 3) head-to-head goal difference; 4) head-to-head goals scored; 5) goal difference; 6) number of goals scored.
(P) Promoted; (R) Relegated

== Promotion playoff ==
12 November 2001

Valga	2 – 1	Lootus
Jääger 14'; Kask 14'		Golitsõn 64'

17 November 2001

Lootus	1 – 0	Valga
Abornev 78'

FC Lootus Kohtla-Järve beat FC Valga 2–2 on away goals rule. Lootus remained in Meistriliiga, Valga in Esiliiga.

== Relegation playoff ==
10 November 2001

TJK-83	7 – 0	Emmaste

17 November 2001

Emmaste	w/o	TJK-83

TJK-83 Tallinn beat Hiiumaa ÜJK Emmaste 7–0 on aggregate. TJK-83 promoted to Esiliiga, Emmaste relegated to Second Division.

== Top goalscorers ==
- 26 – Andrei Afanasov (S.C. Real)
- 21 – Andrus Mitt (Levadia Pärnu)
- 17 – Andrei Usmanov (S.C. Real)
- 15 – Enver Jääger (Valga)

== See also ==
- 2001 Meistriliiga
