= 2012 Esiliiga =

Estonian football league season for second division

Esiliiga
- Season: 2012
- Champions: Infonet
- Promoted: Infonet
- Relegated: Tammeka II; Pärnu Linnameeskond; Lootus
- Matches played: 180
- Goals scored: 639 (3.55 per match)
- Top goalscorer: Manucho (31 goals)
- Biggest home win: Kiviõli Tamme Auto 8–0 Puuma (8 September 2012)
- Biggest away win: Tarvas 0–5 Levadia II (29 July 2012); Tammeka II 0–5 Levadia II (26 August 2012)
- Highest scoring: Levadia II 8–2 Pärnu Linnameeskond (19 August 2012)

The 2012 season of the Esiliiga, the second level in the Estonian football system, is the twenty-third season in the league's history. The season officially began on 11 March 2012 and concluded on 4 November 2013. The previous league champions Tallinna Kalev were promoted to the Meistriliiga while Legion and Warrior were relegated to the II Liiga. For this season those three teams were replaced by Rakvere Tarvas from II liiga East/North division and Tartu SK 10 and Tammeka II from II liiga West/South division.

== Teams ==
=== Stadiums and locations ===
Locations of the 2012 Esiliiga teams

Team	Location	Stadium	Capacity
Flora II	Tallinn	Sportland Arena	600
Infonet	Tallinn	Lasnamäe KHJ Stadium	1,000
Kiviõli Tamme Auto	Kiviõli	Kiviõli Stadium	255
Levadia II	Tallinn	Maarjamäe Stadium	1,000
Lootus	Kohtla-Järve	Kohtla-Järve Stadium	780
Pärnu Linnameeskond	Pärnu	Pärnu Kalev Stadium	1,900
Puuma	Tallinn	Lasnamäe SPK Stadium	666
Tammeka II	Tartu	Tamme Stadium	1,500
Tartu SK 10	Tartu	Tamme Stadium	1,500
Tarvas	Rakvere	Rakvere linnastaadion	2,500

=== Personnel and kits ===
Note: Flags indicate national team as has been defined under FIFA eligibility rules. Players and Managers may hold more than one non-FIFA nationality.

Team	Manager	Captain	Kit manufacturer	Shirt sponsor
Flora II	(Estonia) Norbert Hurt	(Estonia) Ragnar Piir	Nike	KH Energia Konsult
Infonet	(Estonia) Aleksandr Puštov	(Estonia) Jevgeni Gurtšioglujants	Joma	Infonet
Kiviõli Tamme Auto	(Estonia) Erik Šteinberg	(Estonia) Dmitri Kirilov	Adidas	
Levadia II	(Estonia) Argo Arbeiter	(Estonia) Kristjan Tamme	Adidas	Viimsi Keevitus
Lootus	(Estonia) Anatoli Šuganov	(Estonia) Igor Tomaševski	Uhlsport	
Pärnu Linnameeskond	(Estonia) Kalev Pajula	(Estonia) Robert Kirss	Uhlsport	
Puuma	(Russia) Dmitri Krasilnikov	(Estonia) Kert Haavistu	Adidas	
Tammeka II	(Estonia) Ivan O'Konnel-Bronin	(Estonia) Mikk Valtna	Nike	Mäe-kodu
Tartu SK 10	(Estonia) Andrei Borissov	(Estonia) Rodion Aleksejev	Adidas	
Tarvas	(Estonia) Reijo Kuusik	(Estonia) Alari Tovstik	Joma	Hotell Wesenbergh

== League table ==
Pos	Team	Pld	W	D	L	GF	GA	GD	Pts	Promotion or relegation
1	Infonet (C, P)	36	26	5	5	94	33	+61	83	Promotion to Meistriliiga
2	Flora II (Note: Reserve teams are ineligible for promotion.)	36	20	9	7	66	32	+34	69	
3	Tarvas	36	21	5	10	66	58	+8	68	Qualification for promotion play-offs
4	Tartu SK 10	36	15	9	12	65	58	+7	54	
5	Levadia II	36	15	8	13	77	56	+21	53	
6	Kiviõli Tamme Auto	36	12	8	16	78	83	−5	44	
7	Puuma	36	12	7	17	55	61	−6	43	
8	Tammeka II (O)	36	10	7	19	55	83	−28	37	Qualification for relegation play-offs
9	Pärnu Linnameeskond (R)	36	9	9	18	43	72	−29	36	Relegation to Esiliiga B
10	Lootus (R)	36	6	1	29	40	103	−63	19	Relegation to Esiliiga B

Source: Estonian Football Association (in Estonian)
Rules for classification: Points; Least withdrawals or annulled matches; Overall wins; Head-to-head points; Head-to-head goal difference; Goal difference; Goals scored. If two or more teams on the top have the same number of points by the end of the season, the aforementioned rules will not apply and additional game(s) will be played to determine the champions.
(C) Champions; (O) Play-off winners; (P) Promoted; (R) Relegated

=== Promotion play-off ===
At season's end, the runners-up of the 2013 Esiliiga will participate in a two-legged play-off with the ninth place club of the 2013 Meistriliiga for the spot in next year's competition.

11 November 2012
13:00 (UTC+2)

Tarvas	1–2	Tallinna Kalev
Hang 23'	vana.jalgpall.ee/news.php?st=style_m.css&news_id=4463	Tomson 70'; Kase 74'

Rakvere kunstmurustaadion, Rakvere
Referee: Jaan Roos
17 November 2012
13:00 (UTC+2)

Tallinna Kalev	1–0	Tarvas
Ratnikov 38'	vana.jalgpall.ee/news.php?st=style_fp.css&news_id=4478

Kalevi Keskstaadion, Tallinn
Referee: Hannes Kaasik

=== Relegation play-off ===
11 November 2012
13:00 (UTC+2)

Tulevik	1–1	Tammeka II
Kübar 48'	vana.jalgpall.ee/lprotocol.php?st=&proto_id=46123&b=%C3%9Cleminek.meeste	Peedo 22'

Viljandi kunstmuru, Viljandi
Referee: Mart Martin
17 November 2012
13:00 (UTC+2)

Tammeka II	1–2	Tulevik
Paju 59'	vana.jalgpall.ee/lprotocol.php?st=&proto_id=46139&b=%C3%9Cleminek.meeste	Kübar 76'; Roman 117'

Annelinna Stadium, Tartu
Referee: Toomas Nõmmiste

== Season statistics ==
=== Top scorers ===
Rank	Player	Team	Goals
1	(Ivory Coast) Manucho	Infonet	31
2	(Estonia) Maksim Lipin	Infonet	21
2	(Estonia) Tõnis Starkopf	Kiviõli Tamme Auto	21
4	(Estonia) Nikita Koger	Levadia II	14
4	(Estonia) Joonas Ljaš	Tarvas	14
4	(Estonia) Aleksei Mamontov	Tartu SK 10	14
7	(Estonia) Henri Hang	Tarvas	13
7	(Estonia) Georgi Ivanov	Tammeka II/Tartu SK 10	13
9	(Estonia) Marten Saarlas	Levadia II	12
9	(Estonia) Marek Šatov	Kiviõli Tamme Auto	12

== Awards ==
=== Monthly awards ===
Month	Manager of the Month		Player of the Month	
Month	Manager	Club	Player	Club
March	(Estonia) Norbert Hurt	Flora II	(Estonia) Sander Susi	Tarvas
April	(Estonia) Aleksandr Puštov	Infonet	(Estonia) Aleksandr Pruttšenko	Tartu SK 10
May	(Estonia) Argo Arbeiter	Levadia II	(Estonia) Aleksandr Tarassenkov	Kiviõli Tamme Auto
June	(Estonia) Aleksandr Puštov	Infonet	(Estonia) Maksim Lipin	Infonet
July	(Estonia) Reijo Kuusik	Tarvas	(Estonia) Argo Aava	Tarvas
August	(Estonia) Aleksandr Puštov	Infonet	(Estonia) Georgi Ivanov	Tartu SK 10
September	(Estonia) Aleksandr Puštov	Infonet	(Estonia) Tõnis Starkopf	Kiviõli Tamme Auto
October	(Estonia) Kalev Pajula	Pärnu Linnameeskond	(Estonia) Sander Lepik	Flora II

=== Esiliiga Player of the Year ===
Manucho was named Esiliiga Player of the Year.

== See also ==
- 2012 Meistriliiga
- 2011–12 Estonian Cup
- 2012–13 Estonian Cup
