= 2006–07 Estonian Cup =

Estonian football competition

Eesti Karikas

Tournament details
- Country: Estonia
- Teams: 64

Final positions
- Champions: Levadia
- Runners-up: Narva Trans

Tournament statistics
- Matches played: 60
- Goals scored: 346 (5.77 per match)

The 2006–07 Estonian Cup (Estonian: Eesti Karikas) was the 17th season of the Estonian football knockout tournament. Originally, winners of the cup qualified for the 2007–08 UEFA Cup first qualifying round. The defending champion, TVMK, was knocked out in the semi-final against Levadia.

The competition culminated with the final held at Kadriorg Stadium, Tallinn on 15 May 2007 with Levadia taking the title 3–0. Since the Levadia also win the 2006 Meistriliiga, the UEFA Cup places were moved to second and third positioned team in the league.

All in all, 64 teams took part of the competition.

== First round ==
Team 1	Score	Team 2
1 August
Flora U21	3–0	Atli
Kristiine	1–3	Tallinna Kalev II
Elva	5–0	Lootos
2 August
Flora Paide LM	0–1 (a.e.t.)	Tulevik II
Tabasalu	6–1	Operi
TVMK	8–1	Tallinna Kalev
Kespo	3–2 (a.e.t.)	WC Guwalda
Välk 494 Tartu	16–2	Eurouniv
Klooga	0–4	Esteve
Kaitseliit	0–10	Vaprus
Rock & Roll Mäksa	2–5	Quattromed
Virumaa	2–1 (a.e.t.)	Piraaja
Narva Trans	23–0	Jalgpallihaigla
Haiba	2–8	Kuressaare
Tapa	1–2	Püsivus
Warrior II	6–1	Tribling
Maag	4–0	Warrior
Nõmme Kalju	4–2	Kuusalu SK Rada
Elva II	2–4	Saue
Narva Trans II	4–0	Kernu
Ajax Lasnamäe	6–1	Otepää
Tallinna Kuradid	0–8	Tammeka
Nõmme United	9–0	Junior Maardu
Flora	5–0	Olympic
Volunder	0–5	Tulevik
Järva-Jaani	3–1	Märjamaa Kompanii
3 August
Levadia	24–0	Soccernet
Tallinna United	1–4	Hansa United
Toompea	4–0	EBS Team
7 August
Twister	3–6	Tempori
Ararat	4–3	Atletik
Legion	8–0	EPMÜ

== Second round ==
Team 1	Score	Team 2
29 August
Tallinna Kalev II	1–2	Püsivus
Nõmme Kalju	1–0	Esteve
30 August
Ajax Lasnamäe	3–0	Saue
Toompea	4–1	Legion
Tabasalu	2–5	Narva Trans II
Järva-Jaani	0–11	Maag
Virumaa	4–0	Quattromed
Vaprus	4–0	Elva
Tempori	1–4	Nõmme United
Tammeka	0–1	Tulevik II
Flora U21	0–2	Välk 494 Tartu
5 September
Tulevik	1–6	TVMK
6 September
Flora	0–1	Levadia
Narva Trans	w/o	Kespo
7 September
Ararat	3–0	Warrior II
Kuressaare	w/o	Hansa United

== Third round ==
Team 1	Score	Team 2
8 November
Ajax Lasnamäe	3–0	Ararat
Kuressaare	2–2 (a.e.t.) (4–5 p)	Levadia
Maag^{1}	5–1	Narva Trans II
Nõmme United	0–2	Tulevik II
TVMK	9–0	Toompea
Nõmme Kalju	2–5	Narva Trans
9 November
Välk 494 Tartu	w/o	Püsivus
11 November
Virumaa	1–2	Vaprus

Notes

- ^{1} Maag were merged with Tammeka during the winter break and were renamed to Maag Tammeka.

== Quarter-finals ==
17 April 2007	Ajax Lasnamäe	0–6	Narva Trans
			Dubõkin 11' (pen.), 15'; Tarassenkov 25'; Paitsev 27'; Gruznov 87', 89'

17 April 2007	Maag Tammeka	0–1	Levadia
			Zelinski 12'

17 April 2007	TVMK	5–0	Vaprus
	Soosaar 10' (o.g.); Zenjov 32'; Dobrecovs 76'; Kulatšenko 87', 90'

18 April 2007	Välk 494 Tartu	0–1	Tulevik II
			Kudu 90+2'

== Semi-finals ==
1 May 2007	Levadia	1–0	TVMK	Tallinn
	Purje 10'			Stadium: Kadrioru staadion Attendance: 1,500; Referee: Kristo Tohver

1 May 2007	Narva Trans	4–0	Tulevik II	Narva
	Lipartov 65', 67'; Dubõkin 81'; Ivanov 84'			Stadium: Narva Kalevi staadioni kunstmuruväljak Attendance: 50; Referee: Eiko Saar

== Final ==
15 May 2007	Levadia	3–0	Narva Trans	Tallinn
18:45	Nahk 26' (pen.), 45+1' (pen.); Kink 49'			Stadium: Kadrioru staadion Attendance: 1,300; Referee: Sten Kaldma
