= 1993–94 Esiliiga =

Estonian football league season for second division

Esiliiga
- Season: 1993–94

The 1993–94 Esiliiga is the third season of the Esiliiga, second-highest Estonian league for association football clubs, since its establishment in 1992.

== Standings ==
Pos	Team	Pld	W	D	L	GF	GA	GD	Pts	Promotion or relegation
1	Pärnu Kalev (P)	20	14	2	4	70	28	+42	30	Promotion to Meistriliiga
2	Vall	20	13	3	4	78	23	+55	29	
3	Pena	20	11	3	6	32	28	+4	25	
4	Irbis	20	9	4	7	41	26	+15	22	
5	Jalgpallikool	20	9	4	7	37	32	+5	22	
6	Lokomotiiv	20	10	1	9	52	42	+10	21	
7	Kreenholm	20	8	4	8	40	38	+2	20	
8	Tulevik	20	8	3	9	44	38	+6	19	
9	Kehra Paber (R)	20	7	3	10	33	47	−14	17	Relegation to Second Division
10	Olümp (R)	20	5	5	10	39	45	−6	15	Relegation to Second Division
11	Fööniks-Sport (R)	20	0	0	20	8	127	−119	0	Relegation to Second Division
–	Järvamaa	0	0	0	0	0	0	0	0	Withdrew

Source: RSSSF
Rules for classification: 1. points; 2. goal difference; 3. number of goals scored.
(P) Promoted; (R) Relegated

== See also ==
- 1993–94 Meistriliiga
- 1993 in Estonian football
- 1994 in Estonian football
