= 1997 in Estonian football =

- Meistriliiga champions
- FC Lantana Tallinn
- Esiliiga champions
- Merkuur Tartu
- Estonian Cup winners
- Tallinna Sadam JK
- Teams in Europe
- FC Lantana Tallinn; Tallinna Sadam JK; FC Flora Tallinn
- Estonian national team
- 1997 Baltic Cup; 1998 FIFA World Cup qualification
- Estonian Footballer of the Year
- Mart Poom

The 1997 season was the sixth full year of competitive football (soccer) in Estonia since gaining independence from the Soviet Union on 20 August 1991.

== Estonian FA Cup ==
=== Semifinals ===
FC Marlekor	0 – 4 0 – 3	FC Lantana Tallinn

Trans Narva	1 – 1 2 – 3	Tallinna Sadam JK

=== Final ===
1997-05-16

Tallinna Sadam JK	3–2	FC Lantana Tallinn
Krõm 65', 69'; Ustritski 79'		Bragin 53'; Gruznov 72'

Maarjamäe Staadion, Tallinn
Attendance: 300
Referee: Saar (EST)

== National Team ==
Date	Venue	Opponents	Score	Comp	Estonia scorers	Fixture
1997-01-26	Beirut Municipal Stadium; Beirut	Lebanon	2 – 0	F		—
1997-02-11	Stade Louis II; Monte Carlo	Scotland	0 – 0	WCQ98		—
1997-03-01	GSZ Stadium; Larnaca	Azerbaijan	0 – 2	F	Kristal 35'; Zelinski 76'	—
1997-03-29	Rugby Park; Kilmarnock	Scotland	2 – 0	WCQ98		—
1997-04-30	Ernst-Happel-Stadion; Vienna	Austria	2 – 0	WCQ98		—
1997-05-18	Kadrioru Stadium; Tallinn	Latvia	1 – 3	WCQ98	Zelinski 5'	—
1997-06-05	Viljandi linnastaadion Viljandi	Azerbaijan	1 – 0	F	Kirs 73'	—
1997-06-08	Kadrioru Stadium; Tallinn	Sweden	2 – 3	WCQ98	Oper 74'; Kristal 84'	—
1997-06-22	Kuressaare Linnastaadion; Kuressaare	Andorra	4 – 1	F	Zelinski 22'; Lemsalu 28'; Oper 66'; Pari 88'	—
1997-07-09	Žalgiris Stadium; Vilnius	Lithuania	2 – 1	BC97	Reim 77'	—
1997-07-10	Žalgiris Stadium; Vilnius	Latvia	2 – 1	BC97	Kristal 15'	—
1997-08-06	Tamme Staadion; Tartu	Faroe Islands	0 – 2	F		—
1997-08-20	Kadrioru Stadium; Tallinn	Austria	0 – 3	WCQ98		—
1997-09-06	Daugava Stadium; Riga	Latvia	1 – 0	WCQ98		—
1997-10-11	Råsunda Stadium; Stockholm	Sweden	1 – 0	WCQ98		—
1997-11-27	Rizal Memorial Stadium; Manila	Philippines	0 – 1	F	Kristal 46'	—
