= 1998 in Estonian football =

- Meistriliiga champions
- FC Flora Tallinn (1997–1998); FC Flora Tallinn (1998)
- Esiliiga champions
- FC Vall Tallinn (1997–1998); FC Levadia Maardu (1998)
- Estonian Cup winners
- FC Flora Tallinn
- Estonian Super Cup winners
- FC Flora Tallinn
- Teams in Europe
- FC Flora Tallinn; FC Lantana Tallinn; Tallinna Sadam JK
- Estonian national team
- 1998 Baltic Cup; 2000 UEFA Euro qualifying
- Estonian Footballer of the Year
- Mart Poom

The 1998 season was the seventh full year of competitive football (soccer) in Estonia since gaining independence from the Soviet Union on 20 August 1991.

== Estonian FA Cup ==
=== Final ===
1998-06-20

FC Flora Tallinn	3–2	FC Lantana Tallinn

Kuressaare Linnastaadion
Kuressaare

== Estonian Super Cup ==
1998-11-01

FC Flora Tallinn	3–2	Tallinna Sadam

Unknown
Kohtla-Järve

== National Team ==
Date	Venue	Opponents	Score	Comp	Estonia scorers	Fixture
1998-05-09	Montecatini Terme; Italy	Mexico	6 – 0	F		—
1998-05-16	Viljandi linnastaadion Viljandi	Azerbaijan	0 – 0	F		—
1998-06-04	Kadrioru Stadium; Tallinn	Faroe Islands	5 – 0	ECQ	Viikmäe 12'; Reim 40'; Terehhov 75'; Oper 86'; Kirs 90'	—
1998-06-22	Kuressaare Linnastaadion; Kuressaare	Andorra	2 – 1	F	Zelinski 29'; Oper 76'	—
1998-06-25	Sportland Arena; Valga	Latvia	0 – 2	BC98		—
1998-06-28	Viljandi linnastaadion Viljandi	Lithuania	0 – 0	BC98		—
1998-08-20	Spordikeskuse Staadion; Kohtla-Järve	Moldova	0 – 1	F		—
1998-09-05	Koševo Stadium; Sarajevo	Bosnia and Herzegovina	1 – 1	ECQ	Hibić 29' (o.g.)	—
1998-09-23	Kadrioru Stadium; Tallinn	Egypt	2 – 2	F	Kirs 29'; Zelinski 43'	—
1998-10-10	Tynecastle Stadium; Edinburgh	Scotland	3 – 2	ECQ	Hohlov-Simson 35'; Smirnov 76'	—
1998-10-14	Na Stínadlech; Teplice	Czech Republic	4 – 1	ECQ	Arbeiter 90+1'	—
1998-11-18	Boris Paichadze Stadium; Tbilisi	Georgia	3 – 1	F	Arbeiter 82'	—
1998-11-21	Kotayk Stadium; Abovyan	Armenia	2 – 1	F	Zelinski 55'	—
1998-11-28	Unknown; Gyandzha	Azerbaijan	2 – 1	F	Kirs 68'	—
