= 1993 in Estonian football =

- Meistriliiga champions
- FC Norma Tallinn
- Esiliiga champions
- JK Tervis Pärnu
- Estonian Cup winners
- FC Nikol Tallinn
- Teams in Europe
- FC Norma Tallinn, FC Nikol Tallinn
- Estonian national team
- 1993 Baltic Cup; 1994 FIFA World Cup qualification
- Estonian Footballer of the Year
- Mart Poom

The 1993 season was the second complete year of competitive football (soccer) in Estonia since gaining independence from the Soviet Union in 1991-08-20. The Men's National Team booked its first victory since independence by defeating Lithuania at the Baltic Cup, on 1993-07-04.

== Estonian FA Cup ==
=== Quarterfinals ===
Nikol Tallinn	1–0	FC Flora

JK Viljandi	3–5	EP Jõhvi

Keemik Kohtla-Järve	0 – 3 [aet]	Norma Tallinn

Vigri Tallinn	1–0	Pena Jõhvi

=== Semifinals ===
Nikol Tallinn	1 – 0 1 – 1	EP Jõhvi

Norma Tallinn	2 – 0 2 – 0	Vigri Tallinn

=== Final ===
Nikol Tallinn	0–0	Norma Tallinn
Penalties
	4–2

== National Team ==
Date	Venue	Opponents	Score	Comp	Estonia scorers	Fixture
1993-02-20	Myyrmäki Indoor Hall; Vantaa	Finland	0 – 0	IBC93		—
1993-02-21	Myyrmäki Indoor Hall; Vantaa	Latvia	0 – 2	IBC93		—
1993-04-07	ŽŠD Stadion; Ljubljana	Slovenia	2 – 0	F		—
1993-04-14	Stadio Nereo Rocco; Trieste	Italy	2 – 0	WC94		—
1993-05-12	Kadrioru Stadium; Tallinn	Malta	0 – 1	WC94		—
1993-05-19	Kadrioru Stadium; Tallinn	Scotland	0 – 3	WC94		—
1993-06-02	Pittodrie Stadium; Aberdeen	Scotland	3 – 1	WC94	Bragin 57'	—
1993-07-02	Kalevi Stadium; Pärnu	Latvia	0 – 2	BC93		—
1993-07-04	Kalevi Stadium; Pärnu	Lithuania	2 – 1	BC93	Zamorski 25'; Bragin 39'	—
1993-09-05	Kadrioru Stadium; Tallinn	Portugal	0 – 2	WC94		—
1993-09-22	Kadrioru Stadium; Tallinn	Italy	0 – 3	WC94		—
1993-10-26	Sportplatz Rheinau; Balzers	Liechtenstein	0 – 2	F	Bragin 39'; Rajala	—
1993-11-10	Estádio da Luz; Lisbon	Portugal	3 – 0	WC94		—
1993-11-17	Hardturm; Zürich	Switzerland	4 – 0	WC94		—
