= 2006 Esiliiga =

Estonian football league season for second division

Esiliiga
- Season: 2006

The 2006 Esiliiga is the 16th season of the Esiliiga, second-highest Estonian league for association football clubs, since its establishment in 1992.

FC Kuressaare gained automatic promotion to the Meistriliiga as FC Levadia II are the reserve team for Meistriliiga champions FC Levadia and therefore can not be promoted to the same league as its parent club. JK Tallinna Kalev also go up after winning the promotion-relegation play-off. The league's top-scorer was FC Levadia youngster Kaimar Saag with 37 goals. Nõmme Kalju's Andrus Mitt scored 35 goals.

== Final table of Esiliiga season 2006 ==
Pos	Team	Pld	W	D	L	GF	GA	GD	Pts	Promotion or relegation
1	Levadia II Tallinn (Note: Reserve teams are ineligible for promotion.) (C)	36	28	4	4	132	24	+108	88	
2	FC Kuressaare (P)	36	22	5	9	64	44	+20	71	Promotion to Meistriliiga
3	Kalev Tallinn (O, P)	36	20	6	10	84	63	+21	66	Qualification for relegation play-offs
4	Flora II Tallinn	36	19	3	14	81	56	+25	60	
5	Kalju Nõmme	36	18	5	13	76	80	−4	59	
6	TVMK II Tallinn	36	17	4	15	66	63	+3	55	
7	Tulevik II Viljandi	36	9	11	16	53	52	+1	38	
8	Lootus Kohtla-Järve* (R)	36	10	3	23	46	99	−53	33	Qualification for relegation play-offs
9	Dünamo Tallinn (R)	36	7	8	21	44	85	−41	29	Relegation to II liiga (Note: Denied Esiliiga license)
10	FC Elva	36	4	3	29	20	100	−80	15	Spared from relegation (Note: Stayed up as Trans II decided against promotion and two clubs above were denied the Esiliiga license.)

(C) Champions; (O) Play-off winners; (P) Promoted; (R) Relegated

== Promotion/relegation playoff ==
November 12, 2006

Kalev Sillamäe	5 - 1	Lootus Kohtla-Järve

November 18, 2006

Lootus Kohtla-Järve	1 - 3	Kalev Sillamäe

== Season statistics ==
=== Top goalscorers ===
As of 11 November 2007.

Rank	Player	Club	Goals
1	(Estonia) Kaimar Saag	Levadia II	37
2	(Estonia) Andrus Mitt	Nõmme Kalju	35
3	(Estonia) Jevgeni Gurtšioglujants	Levadia II	17
3	(Estonia) Sander Puri	Levadia II	17
5	(Estonia) Artjom Dmitrijev	TVMK II	16
5	(Estonia) Tiit Tikenberg	Tallinna Kalev	16
7	(Estonia) Dmitri Kirilov	Tallinna Kalev	15
8	(Estonia) Kristian Marmor	Levadia II	14
9	(Estonia) Eino Puri	Levadia II	12
9	(Estonia) Anton Semjonov	Lootus	12
9	(Estonia) Rainer Veskimäe	Kuressaare	12

== See also ==
- 2006 Meistriliiga
