= 2006 Meistriliiga =

Estonian national championships in football

Meistriliiga
- Season: 2006
- Champions: Levadia (4th title)
- Top goalscorer: Maksim Gruznov (31)

2006 Meistriliiga was the 16th season of the Meistriliiga, Estonia's premier football league. Levadia won their fourth title.

== Season overview ==
FC Levadia won the 2006 Meistriliiga championship and entered the 2007/08 UEFA Champions League 1st Qualifying Round. Narva Trans finished in their best ever silver-medal position, while FC Flora also gained a place compared to last season on 2005 champions FC TVMK's disappointing year. The latter will enter the Intertoto Cup and the other two above mentioned teams enter the UEFA Cup qualifying rounds in the summer of 2007.

The bottom of the table provided some intrigue as well. The two Tartu teams ended mid-table, with Tammeka's youthful-looking squad impressing under experienced coach and ex-international Sergei Ratnikov, in his first year as the head coach. Pärnu Vaprus was perhaps the surprise package of the season finishing seventh on their debut year in the Meistriliiga and bringing Pärnu back on to the Estonian football map. Mainly Russian-speaking Tallinn team, FC Ajax Lasnamäe, proved a point by staying up against all predictions. JK Viljandi Tulevik had a dreadful year and had to go into the play-offs against Esiliiga's JK Tallinna Kalev and lost, which should have meant their relegation. But after the merging of the Tartu clubs, JK Maag and Tammeka, they will still be in the Meistriliiga in 2007. The team with the youngest average aged squad in the league, Warrior Valga, were relegated without a meaningful fight.

The league's top scorers were two JK Narva Trans strikers Maksim Gruznov (with 31 goals) and Dmitri Lipartov (27 goals). FC Flora Tallinn's Vjatšeslav Zahovaiko scored 25, FC Levadia Tallinn's Indrek Zelinski 21 goals.

== League table ==
Pos	Team	Pld	W	D	L	GF	GA	GD	Pts	Qualification or relegation
1	Levadia (C)	36	30	4	2	114	29	+85	94	Qualification for Champions League first qualifying round
2	Narva Trans	36	25	8	3	106	36	+70	83	Qualification for UEFA Cup first qualifying round
3	Flora	36	26	4	6	93	34	+59	82	Qualification for UEFA Cup first qualifying round
4	TVMK	36	22	6	8	83	37	+46	72	Qualification for Intertoto Cup first round
5	Maag	36	13	9	14	65	68	−3	48	Merged together
6	Tammeka	36	12	7	17	45	57	−12	43	Merged together
7	Vaprus	36	10	4	22	49	86	−37	34	
8	Lasnamäe Ajax	36	6	7	23	35	104	−69	25	
9	Tulevik	36	5	5	26	29	74	−45	20	Spared from relegation
10	Warrior (R)	36	3	2	31	16	110	−94	11	Relegation to Esiliiga

Source: Estonian Football Association (in Estonian)
Rules for classification: 1) points; 2) number of wins; 3) head-to-head points; 4) head-to-head goal difference; 5) head-to-head goals scored; 6) goal difference; 7) number of goals scored.
(C) Champions; (R) Relegated

=== Relegation play-off ===
8 November 2006

Tallinna Kalev	+ / -	Tulevik

12 November 2006

Tulevik	/ +	Tallinna Kalev

Both games were awarded - / + to Tallinna Kalev since Tulevik fielded an ineligible player.

Kalev had originally won 1 – 1 with away goals

Tulevik kept their place in the Meistriliiga as a result of merger of Tammeka Tartu and Maag Tartu.

== Results ==
Each team played every opponent four times, twice at home and twice on the road, for a total of 36 games.

=== First half of season ===
Home \ Away	FLO	AJX	LEV	MAA	TRS	TAM	TUL	TVM	VAP	WAR
Flora		6–0	0–1	1–1	2–1	3–0	3–0	1–4	4–0	2–0
Lasnamäe Ajax	1–4		0–3	3–3	0–3	1–2	1–0	1–2	3–1	2–0
Levadia	4–1	8–0		1–1	1–1	4–1	2–0	2–1	4–1	5–0
Maag	1–2	3–1	1–2		2–2	0–2	0–0	2–0	0–3	6–0
Narva Trans	2–2	2–0	1–1	2–2		3–2	6–1	1–0	6–3	4–0
Tammeka	0–1	4–1	0–5	1–2	0–3		0–0	0–2	2–0	3–0
Tulevik	0–3	5–2	1–3	0–3	0–3	0–2		1–2	1–1	3–0
TVMK	1–0	8–1	0–2	5–0	1–1	1–1	2–1		7–1	4–1
Vaprus	2–4	1–0	1–2	2–3	1–4	0–2	3–0	1–0		2–0
Warrior	0–2	1–3	0–4	0–2	0–5	1–1	3–0	0–5	1–3	

Legend: Blue = home team win; Yellow = draw; Red = away team win.

=== Second half of season ===
Home \ Away	FLO	AJX	LEV	MAA	TRS	TAM	TUL	TVM	VAP	WAR
Flora		6–0	1–0	2–0	3–2	5–2	2–0	1–1	2–0	6–0
Lasnamäe Ajax	0–2		0–8	3–2	0–5	2–0	1–1	2–2	1–2	1–2
Levadia	2–2	11–3		2–0	1–1	2–0	3–0	3–1	3–1	7–1
Maag	2–3	2–2	4–2		2–6	1–1	4–3	1–1	4–2	4–1
Narva Trans	2–1	2–0	2–3	6–1		2–0	3–0	3–2	5–1	4–0
Tammeka	1–3	2–1	0–3	0–0	2–4		1–0	1–2	1–1	5–0
Tulevik	0–2	0–0	0–2	0–2	1–2	1–2		1–4	1–2	1–0
TVMK	3–2	1–0	2–3	3–0	1–1	2–1	3–1		3–1	1–0
Vaprus	1–4	0–0	1–3	1–4	0–3	1–1	1–2	0–3		5–2
Warrior	0–5	0–0	0–1	1–0	0–3	0–2	1–4	0–3	1–2	

Legend: Blue = home team win; Yellow = draw; Red = away team win.

== Season statistics ==
=== Top scorers ===
Rank	Player	Club	Goals
1	(Estonia) Maksim Gruznov	Narva Trans	31
2	(Russia) Dmitri Lipartov	Narva Trans	27
3	(Estonia) Vjatšeslav Zahovaiko	Flora	25
4	(Estonia) Indrek Zelinski	Levadia	21
5	(Estonia) Aleksandr Dubõkin	Narva Trans	19
6	(Estonia) Vitali Gussev	Maag Tartu	18
6	(Estonia) Vladislav Gussev	TVMK	18
6	(Estonia) Konstantin Vassiljev	Levadia	18
9	(Russia) Nikita Andreev	Levadia	17
9	(Latvia) Viktors Dobrecovs	TVMK	17

== See also ==
- 2006 Esiliiga
