= Vitali Gussev =

Estonian footballer

Personal information
- Full name: Vitali Gussev
- Date of birth: 16 March 1983 (age 43)
- Place of birth: Tartu, then part of Estonian SSR, Soviet Union
- Height: 1.86 m (6 ft 1 in)
- Position: Striker

Youth career
- Tartu JK

Senior career*
| Years | Team | Apps | (Gls) |
| 1997–1998 | Tartu JK | 9 | (2) |
| 1999–2000 | Tammeka Tartu | 18 | (22) |
| 2001 | TVMK Tallinn | 11 | (3) |
| 2002 | Narva Trans | 13 | (2) |
| 2002 | → Merkuur Tartu (loan) | 3 | (3) |
| 2002–2004 | Trelleborg | 21 | (7) |
| 2004–2005 | Merkuur Tartu | 16 | (4) |
| 2005 | FBK Kaunas | 8 | (0) |
| 2005 | Atlantas | 8 | (1) |
| 2006 | Merkuur Tartu | 33 | (18) |
| 2007–2008 | Enköping | 51 | (4) |
| 2009 | Levadia Tallinn | 35 | (26) |
| 2010–2011 | Astra Ploieşti | 12 | (0) |
| 2012 | Narva Trans | 34 | (5) |
| 2015 | Kiviõli FC Irbis | 30 | (16) |
| 2016-2024 | Maardu Linnameeskond | 250 | (201) |

International career^{‡}
| | Estonia U21 | 7 | (1) |
| 2009 | Estonia | 1 | (0) |
- * Club domestic league appearances and goals as of 28 April 2026 ‡ National team caps and goals as of 14:40, 6 March 2010

Vitali Gussev (born 16 March 1983 in Tartu) is an Estonian former professional footballer.

== Club career ==
On 26 February 2010, Gussev signed a three-and-a-half-year deal with Romanian club FC Astra Ploieşti. He made the debut for his new club two days later against FC Brașov, helping his team to a 2–1 victory.

== International career ==
Gussev made his international debut on 29 May 2009 in a friendly match against Wales.

== Personal life ==
Gussev is 1.86 m tall and weighs 73 kg. He has a younger brother, Vladislav Gussev, who also plays football.

== Honours ==
=== Club ===
Levadia Tallinn

- Meistriliiga: 2009

=== Individual ===
- Meistriliiga top scorer: 2009
- Esiliiga Player of the Year: 2017
