= Esiliiga =

Second division in the Estonian football league system

- Founded: 1992; 34 years ago
- Country: Estonia
- Confederation: UEFA
- Divisions: Esiliiga
- Number of clubs: 10
- Level on pyramid: 2
- Promotion to: Meistriliiga
- Relegation to: Esiliiga B
- Domestic cup: Estonian Cup
- Current champions: Nõmme United (2nd title) (2025)
- Most championships: Levadia II Tallinn (7 titles)
- Website: Official website
- Current: 2026 Esiliiga

The Esiliiga is the second division in the Estonian football league system. The Esiliiga is ranked below the Meistriliiga and above the Esiliiga B.

As in most countries with low temperatures in winter time, the season starts in March and ends in November. The league features several reserve teams of Meistriliiga clubs. According to the rules set by the Estonian Football Association, reserve teams are ineligible for promotion to the Meistriliiga, but can play in the Estonian Cup.

== Competition format ==
During the season, the teams play each of the other four times twice at home and twice away. This makes for a total of 36 games played each season. The teams gain three points for a win, one for a draw, and none for a defeat. Promotion and relegation between divisions is a central feature of the league. At the end of the season, clubs at the top of their division win promotion to the next higher division, while those at the bottom will be relegated to the next lower one. At the end of a season, the top Esiliiga club gains promotion to the Meistriliiga, provided it meets the licensing criteria of the Meistriliiga. Reserve teams in Estonia play in the same league system as the senior team, however, they must play at least one level below their main side, and are thus ineligible for promotion to the Meistriliiga. Two bottom end clubs of the Esiliiga are relegated to the Esiliiga B, and two top clubs of Esiliiga B are promoted to the Esiliiga. The two-legged play-offs for the Meistriliiga spot are contested between the ninth placed (second bottom) club in the Meistriliiga and the second in the Esiliiga, and the two-legged play-offs for the Esiliiga spot are contested between the eighth placed (third bottom) club in the Esiliiga and the third in the Esiliiga B.

== Clubs ==
=== Current clubs ===
The following clubs are competing in the Esiliiga during the 2026 season.

Club	Position in 2025	Seasons in Esiliiga	First season of current spell	Titles	Last title
Elva^{b}	4th	15	2017	0	—N/a
FC Tallinn^{a,b}	8th	4	2023	0	—N/a
Flora U21 Tallinn^{a,b,c}	5th	21	2006	2	2015
Levadia U21 Tallinn^{a,b,c}	7th	23	2004	7	2013
Maardu Linnameeskond	1st in the Esiliiga B	6	2026	3	2021
Nõmme Kalju U21^{b,c}	6th	6	2025	0	—N/a
Nõmme United U21^{a,b,c}	2nd in the Esiliiga B	1	2026	0	—N/a
Tallinna Kalev^{a}	10th in the Premium Liiga	9	2026	1	2011
Viimsi^{a,b}	2nd	5	2022	0	—N/a
Welco^{b}	3rd	7	2024	0	—N/a

^{a} – never been relegated from Esiliiga
^{b} – never played in Meistriliiga
^{c} – ineligible for promotion to Meistriliiga

== Champions ==
Season	Champions	Runners-up	Third place	Top goalscorer	Goals
1992	Kreenholm Narva	Tempo Tallinn	Valga Lokomotiiv		
1992–93	Pärnu Tervis	Tallinna Sadam	Kreenholm Narva		
1993–94	Pärnu JK/Kalev	Vall Tallinn	Pena Jõhvi	(Estonia) Vadim Dolinin (Kalev Pärnu)	21
1994–95	Tallinna Dünamo	Tallinna Jalgpallikool	Pena Jõhvi		
1994–95	Lelle	Pärnu Tervis	Viljandi Tulevik		
1995–96	Norma Tallinn	Vall Tallinn	Tallinna Jalgpallikool		
1996–97	Tallinna Dünamo (2)	Tallinna Jalgpallikool	Pärnu	(Estonia) Igor Bratšuk (Olümp Maardu)	8
1997–98	Vall Tallinn	Olümpia Maardu	Dokker Tallinn	(Estonia) Andrei Afanassov (Vall Tallinn) (Estonia) Aleksei Titov (Vall Tallinn)	13
1998	Levadia Maardu	Vigri Tallinn	Lootus Kohtla-Järve	(Estonia) Igor Bratšuk (Levadia Maardu)	9
1999	Kuressaare	Lootus Kohtla-Järve	Vigri Tallinn	(Lithuania) Svajūnas Raučkis (Kuressaare)	27
2000	Maardu	Pärnu Tervis	Viljandi	(Estonia) Vladimir Tšelnokov (Maardu)	26
2001	Levadia Pärnu	Valga	S.C. Real Maardu	(Estonia) Andrei Afanassov (S.C. Real Maardu)	26
2002	Valga	Kuressaare	Maardu	(Estonia) Andrei Afanassov (Maardu)	25
2003	Lootus Kohtla-Järve	Pärnu Tervis	M.C. Tallinn	(Estonia) Aleksei Titov (Ajax Lasnamäe)	29
2004	Tartu Tammeka	Levadia II Tallinn	Pärnu Tervis	(Estonia) Oliver Konsa (Tartu Tammeka)	25
2005	Pärnu Vaprus	Levadia II Tallinn	Ajax Lasnamäe	(Russia) Nikita Andreev (Ajax Lasnamäe)	29
2006	Levadia II Tallinn (2)	Kuressaare	Tallinna Kalev	(Estonia) Kaimar Saag (Levadia II Tallinn)	37
2007	Levadia II Tallinn (3)	Flora II Tallinn	Sillamäe Kalev	(Estonia) Andrus Mitt (Nõmme Kalju)	24
2008	Levadia II Tallinn (4)	Kuressaare	Flora II Tallinn	(Estonia) Sergei Jegorov (TVMK II Tallinn)	20
2009	Levadia II Tallinn (5)	Lootus Kohtla-Järve	Warrior Valga	(Estonia) Tõnis Starkopf (Kiviõli Tamme Auto/Levadia II Tallinn)	32
2010	Levadia II Tallinn (6)	Flora II Tallinn	Ajax Lasnamäe	(Estonia) Tõnis Starkopf (Kiviõli Tamme Auto)	28
2011	Tallinna Kalev	Infonet Tallinn	Kiviõli Tamme Auto	(Estonia) Maksim Rõtškov (Infonet Tallinn)	40
2012	Infonet Tallinn	Flora II Tallinn	Rakvere Tarvas	(Ivory Coast) Manucho (Infonet Tallinn)	31
2013	Levadia II Tallinn (7)	Jõhvi Lokomotiv	Flora II Tallinn	(Estonia) Tõnis Starkopf (Irbis Kiviõli)	28
2014	Flora II Tallinn	Levadia II Tallinn	Pärnu Linnameeskond	(Estonia) Kristen Saarts (Pärnu Linnameeskond/Levadia II Tallinn)	31
2015	Flora II Tallinn (2)	Levadia II Tallinn	Infonet II Tallinn	(Estonia) Eduard Golovljov (Infonet II Tallinn)	41
2016	Viljandi Tulevik	Flora U21 Tallinn	Infonet II Tallinn	(Estonia) Eduard Golovljov (Infonet II Tallinn)	39
2017	Maardu Linnameeskond	Tallinna Kalev	Rakvere Tarvas	(Estonia) Vitali Gussev (Maardu Linnameeskond)	38
2018	Maardu Linnameeskond (2)	Flora U21 Tallinn	Levadia U21 Tallinn	(Estonia) Vitali Gussev (Maardu Linnameeskond)	43
2019	TJK Legion	Flora U21 Tallinn	Pärnu Vaprus	(Estonia) Rejal Alijev (TJK Legion)	38
2020	Pärnu Vaprus (2)	Maardu Linnameeskond	Nõmme United	(Estonia) Kevin Mätas (Nõmme United)	22
2021	Maardu Linnameeskond (3)	Tallinna Kalev	Paide Linnameeskond U21	(Estonia) Robi Saarma (Nõmme United)	28
2022	Harju JK	Levadia U21 Tallinn	Elva	(Estonia) Egert Õunapuu (Nõmme United)	36
2023	Nõmme United	Viimsi	Flora U21 Tallinn	(Estonia) Egert Õunapuu (Nõmme United)	32
2024	Harju JK (2)	Viimsi	Flora U21 Tallinn	(Estonia) Gregor Lehtmets (Viimsi)	31
2025	Nõmme United (2)	Viimsi	Tartu Welco	(Estonia) Egert Õunapuu (Nõmme United)	23
2026	Tartu JK Welco	Viimsi JK	Tallinna FCI Levadia U21	(Estonia) Kenlou Laasner (Tartu JK Welco)	35

1. East/North champion
2. South/West champion

=== Total titles won ===
Club	1st place, gold medalist(s)	2nd place, silver medalist(s)	3rd place, bronze medalist(s)	Winning seasons
Levadia U21 Tallinn	7	5	2	2000, 2006, 2007, 2008, 2009, 2010, 2013
Maardu Linnameeskond	3	1	0	2017, 2018, 2021
Flora U21 Tallinn	2	6	4	2014, 2015
Pärnu Vaprus	2	0	1	2005, 2020
Nõmme United	2	0	1	2023, 2025
Tallinna Dünamo	2	0	0	1994–95, 1996–97
Harju JK	2	0	0	2022, 2024
Pärnu Tervis	1	3	1	1992–93
Kuressaare	1	3	0	1999
Järve Kohtla-Järve	1	2	1	2003
Tallinna Kalev	1	2	1	2011
Vall Tallinn	1	2	0	1997–98
Valga Warrior	1	1	1	2002
Infonet Tallinn	1	1	0	2012
Kreenholm Narva	1	0	1	1992
Pärnu	1	0	1	1993–94
Viljandi Tulevik	1	0	1	2016
Tartu Welco	1	0	1	2026
Lelle	1	0	0	1994–95
Norma Tallinn	1	0	0	1995–96
Levadia Tallinn	1	0	0	1998
Levadia Pärnu	1	0	0	2001
Tartu Tammeka	1	0	0	2004
TJK Legion	1	0	0	2019
Viimsi	0	4	0	
Tallinna Jalgpallikool	0	2	1	
Vigri Tallinn	0	1	1	
Tempo Tallinn	0	1	0	
Tallinna Sadam	0	1	0	
Olümpia Maardu	0	1	0	
Jõhvi Lokomotiv	0	1	0	
Pena Jõhvi	0	0	2	
Maardu	0	0	2	
Ajax Lasnamäe	0	0	2	
Infonet II Tallinn	0	0	2	
Rakvere Tarvas	0	0	2	
Valga Lokomotiiv	0	0	1	
Dokker Tallinn	0	0	1	
Viljandi	0	0	1	
M.C. Tallinn	0	0	1	
Sillamäe Kalev	0	0	1	
Kiviõli Irbis	0	0	1	
Pärnu Linnameeskond	0	0	1	
Paide Linnameeskond U21	0	0	1	
Elva	0	0	1	

1. East/North champion
2. South/West champion

=== All-time Esiliiga table ===
The table is a cumulative record of all match results, points and goals of every team that has played in the Esiliiga since its inception in 1992. The table that follows is accurate as of the end of the 2026 season. Teams in bold played in the Esiliiga 2026 season. Numbers in bold are the record (highest) numbers in each column.

In this ranking 3 points are awarded for a win, 1 for a draw, and 0 for a loss. Promotion matches and relegation matches involving clubs of higher or lower leagues are not counted.

The table is sorted by all-time points.

Pos.	Club	Seasons	Titles	Pld	W	D	L	GF	GA	GD	Pts	PPG
1	**Tallinna FCI Levadia U21**	**25**	**7**	**868**	**467**	**151**	250	**2057**	**1173**	**+884**	**1552**	1.79
2	**Tallinna FC Flora U21**	18	2	743	392	131	220	1604	984	+620	1307	1.76
3	**FC Elva**	15	0	511	174	82	**255**	719	1006	-287	604	1.18
4	**JK Tallinna Kalev**	9	1	318	159	62	97	673	495	+178	539	1.69
5	Rakvere JK Tarvas	10	0	360	132	64	164	556	731	-175	460	1.28
6	FC Kuressaare	9	1	278	136	41	99	568	482	+86	449	1.62
7	**Maardu Linnameeskond**	6	3	206	124	25	57	513	294	+219	397	1.93
8	**Viimsi JK**	6	0	208	118	36	54	416	229	+187	390	1.88
9	Kiviõli FC Irbis	8	0	288	110	51	124	556	542	+14	381	1.32
10	FC Nõmme United	5	2	170	104	26	40	473	222	+251	338	1.99
11	Viljandi JK Tulevik	8	1	202	96	35	81	348	352	-4	323	1.60
12	Kohtla-Järve FC Lootus	7	1	214	97	27	90	411	400	+11	318	1.49
13	Tartu JK Tammeka U21	8	0	278	89	50	139	425	584	-159	317	1.14
14	Lasnamäe FC Ajax	6	0	200	93	37	70	449	311	+138	316	1.58
15	Pärnu JK Vaprus	6	2	204	92	38	74	400	343	+57	314	1.54
16	**Tartu JK Welco**	7	1	246	86	50	110	390	490	-100	308	1.25
17	Pärnu KEK	8	1	188	86	23	77	416	370	+46	281	1.49
18	FC Valga	8	1	164	79	14	61	304	276	+28	251	1.53
19	**Nõmme Kalju FC U21**	6	0	216	68	32	116	313	477	-154	236	1.09
20	Tallinna FC TVMK II	5	0	172	63	23	86	302	363	-61	212	1.23
21	Valga FC Warrior	6	0	200	61	29	110	285	438	-153	212	1.06
22	Tartu FC Santos	5	0	216	59	27	94	290	388	-98	204	0.94
23	Tallinna JK Legion	5	1	180	65	27	88	328	393	-65	201	1.12
24	Tallinna JK Dünamo	7	2	144	58	19	67	276	319	-43	193	1.34
25	JK Sillamäe Kalev	7	0	162	56	24	74	232	303	-71	192	1.19
26	**FC Tallinn**	4	0	144	53	27	64	245	271	-26	186	1.29
27	Vändra JK Vaprus	5	0	174	52	30	92	259	375	-116	186	1.07
28	Pärnu JK	7	1	158	48	29	73	254	304	-50	173	1.09
29	Paide Linnameeskond U21	4	0	138	53	13	72	273	347	-74	172	1.25
30	FCI Tallinn U21	3	0	108	51	12	45	266	214	+52	165	1.53
31	Tartu JK Merkuur	6	0	122	49	18	55	199	238	-39	165	1.35
32	Harju JK Laagri	2	2	72	46	16	10	207	88	+119	154	2.14
33	FCI Tallinn	2	1	72	45	16	11	195	80	+115	151	2.10
34	FC Puuma	4	0	144	37	28	79	208	372	-164	139	0.97
35	JK Tallinna Kalev U21	4	0	144	34	34	76	200	317	-117	136	0.94
36	Pärnu Linnameeskond	3	0	108	37	23	49	207	213	-6	134	1.24
37	Tallinna Jalgpalliklubi	4	0	120	34	22	64	164	300	-136	124	1.03
38	FC M.C. Tallinn	3	0	84	34	17	33	167	189	-22	119	1.42
39	Tallinna JK Vall	4	1	58	36	7	15	171	80	+91	115	1.98
40	Maardu FK Olümpia	5	1	78	33	16	29	158	152	+6	115	1.47
41	Tartu SK 10	2	0	72	32	12	28	123	125	-2	108	1.50
42	Viljandi JK Tulevik U21	3	0	108	28	24	56	139	215	-76	108	1.00
43	Nõmme Kalju FC	2	0	72	31	14	27	145	149	-4	107	1.49
44	Tartu JK Tammeka	3	1	84	29	18	37	165	199	-34	105	1.25
45	Tallinna Jalgpallikool	5	0	72	31	10	31	117	141	-24	103	1.43
46	Maardu S.C. Real	2	0	56	27	13	16	144	102	+42	94	1.68
47	Jõhvi FC Lokomotiiv	2	0	72	26	13	33	115	121	-6	91	1.26
48	Tartu KSK Vigri	2	0	42	26	9	7	98	40	+58	87	2.07
49	Narva Kreenholm	4	1	58	25	10	23	120	125	-5	85	1.47
50	Kiviõli JK Irbis	4	0	58	23	8	27	99	117	-18	77	1.33
51	Kohtla-Järve JK Järve	3	0	102	21	13	68	106	270	-164	76	0.75
52	Kohtla-Järve JK Pena	3	0	46	22	7	17	95	85	+10	73	1.59
53	JK Tabasalu	2	0	72	22	5	45	116	171	-55	71	0.99
54	Paide Linnameeskond	1	0	36	14	12	10	58	44	+14	54	1.50
55	Pärnu FC Levadia	1	1	28	15	7	6	67	39	+28	52	1.86
56	Tallinna FC Norma	2	1	28	15	2	11	77	44	+33	47	1.68
57	Ida-Virumaa FC Alliance	2	0	72	14	5	53	79	228	-149	47	0.65
58	**FC Nõmme United U21**	1	0	36	12	6	18	59	73	-14	42	1.17
59	FC Viljandi	1	0	28	12	4	12	31	46	-15	40	1.43
60	JK Tallinna Sadam	1	0	16	12	2	2	52	14	+38	38	**2.38**
61	Paide KEK	2	0	28	10	6	12	56	64	-8	36	1.29
62	Keila JK	1	0	36	10	5	21	41	88	-47	35	0.97
63	Lelle SK	1	0	36	11	1	24	49	100	-51	34	0.94
64	FC Kuressaare II	1	0	28	8	3	17	35	79	-44	27	0.96
65	Kehra JK Paber	1	0	20	7	3	10	33	47	-14	24	1.20
66	Kallaste JK Peipsi Kalur	2	0	28	7	3	18	36	75	-39	24	0.86
67	Tallinna JK Metallist	1	0	12	7	0	5	30	25	+5	21	1.75
68	Tallinna JK Dokker	1	0	14	6	3	5	30	26	+4	21	1.50
70	Tallinna JK Tempo	1	0	12	6	1	5	29	26	+3	19	1.58
71	Tallinna FC Arsenal	1	0	14	5	0	9	26	31	-5	15	1.07
72	Tartu JK Merkuur-Juunior	1	0	36	3	5	28	27	97	-70	14	0.39
73	Põltsamaa JK Sport	1	0	10	1	0	9	6	27	-21	3	0.30
74	Tartu FC DAG	1	0	14	0	1	3	12	67	-55	1	0.07

== See also ==
- Esiliiga Player of the Year
- Meistriliiga
- Esiliiga B
