= 1992 in Estonian football =

- Meistriliiga champions
- FC Norma Tallinn
- Esiliiga champions
- Kreenholm Narva
- Estonian Cup winners
- Competition not held
- Teams in Europe
- FC Norma Tallinn
- Estonian national team
- 1992 Baltic Cup; 1994 FIFA World Cup qualification
- Estonian Footballer of the Year
- Urmas Hepner

The 1992 season was the 72nd season of competitive football (soccer) in Estonia, and the first one in the Baltic country as an independent nation. The championship was played in the spring of 1992.

== Cup Final ==
- No FA Cup was held in 1992.

== National Team ==
Date	Venue	Opponents	Score	Comp	Estonia scorers	Fixture
1992-06-03	Kadrioru Stadium; Tallinn	Slovenia	1 – 1	F	Puštov 5'	—
1992-07-10	Daugava Stadium; Liepāja	Latvia	2 – 1	BC92	Olumets 61'	—
1992-07-11	Daugava Stadium; Liepāja	Lithuania	1 – 1	BC92	Olumets 64'	—
1992-08-16	Kadrioru Stadium; Tallinn	Switzerland	0 – 6	WC94		—
1992-10-25	Ta' Qali Stadium; Valletta	Malta	0 – 0	WC94		—
