= FC Lelle =

Estonian football club

Home colours	Away colours

FC Lelle is an amateur football club in Lelle, Estonia.

It is not to be confused with Lelle SK, a former club in the same town, which was renamed as JK Tervis Pärnu.
