= Argo Arbeiter =

Estonian footballer and manager

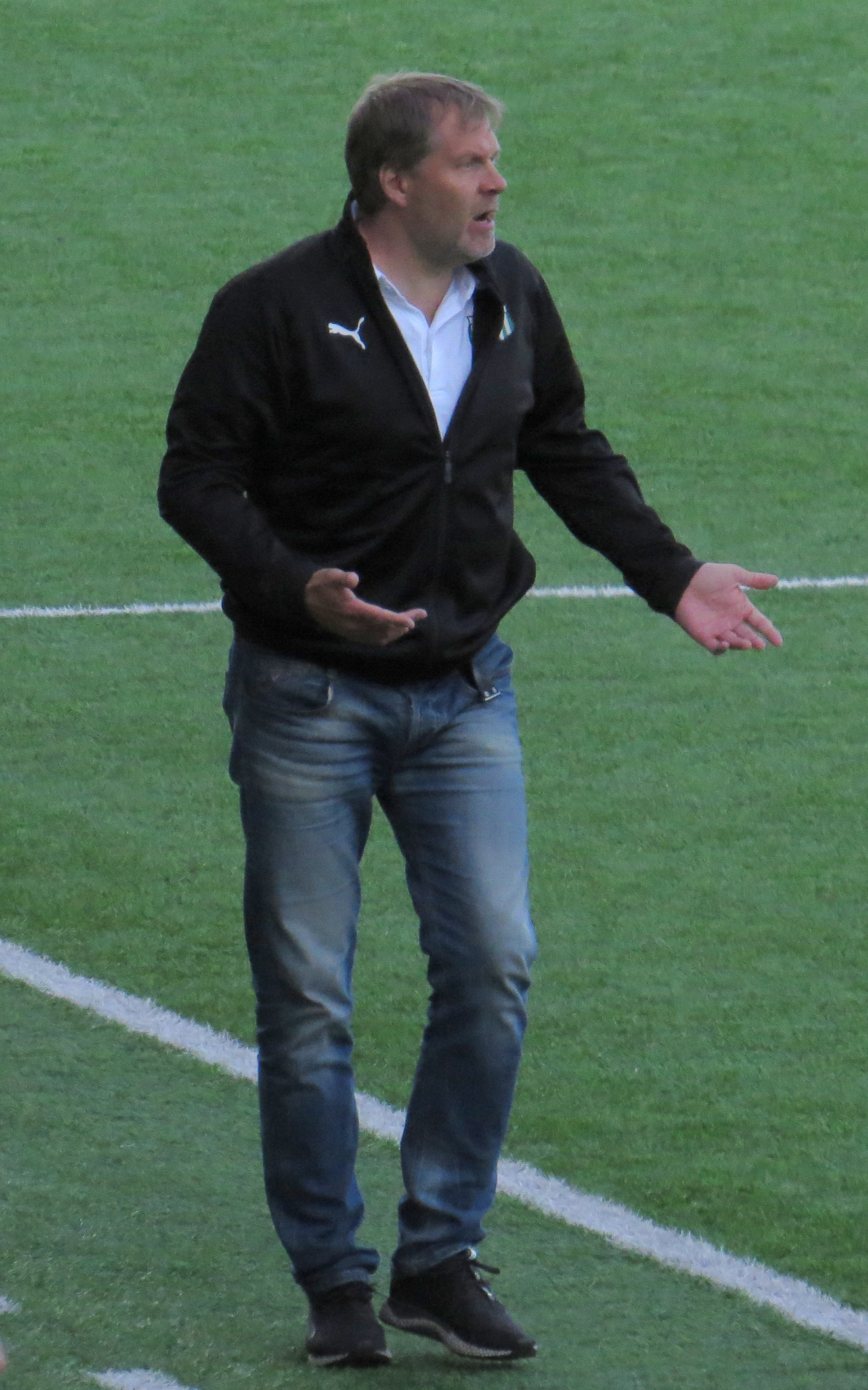
- Arbeiter as head coach of KTP in 2019

Personal information
- Full name: Argo Arbeiter
- Date of birth: 5 December 1973 (age 52)
- Place of birth: Viljandi, then part of Estonian SSR, Soviet Union
- Height: 1.81 m (5 ft 11 1/2 in)
- Position: Forward

Team information
- Current team: Nõmme Kalju (sporting director)

Senior career*
Years	Team	Apps	(Gls)
1992	Viljandi	26	(4)
1992–1998	Flora	4	(1)
1993–1996	→ Tervis Pärnu (loan)	22	(8)
1996–1997	→ Lelle (loan)	23	(9)
1997–1998	→ Viljandi (loan)	20	(9)
1998–2000	KTP	56	(17)
2000–2001	Jaro	11	(3)
2001–2002	Elva	12	(14)
2002–2005	Levadia	70	(34)
2006–2007	Tallinna Sport		
2008–2009	Toompea		
2010–2011	Eston Villa		

International career
1995–2000	Estonia	29	(6)

Managerial career
- 2008–2009: Eston Villa
- 2012–2016: Levadia U21
- 2016: Flora
- 2017–2018: Tallinna Kalev
- 2019–2021: KTP
- 2021–: Nõmme Kalju (sporting director)
- * Club domestic league appearances and goals

Argo Arbeiter (born 5 December 1973) is an Estonian football manager and former Estonian international footballer. Currently he is the sporting director of Nõmme Kalju.

== International career ==
Arbeiter earned a total number of 29 caps for the Estonia national football team during his career, scoring six goals. He scored four goals in a single halftime in a friendly against Andorra on 13 November 1996.

== Career statistics ==
=== International goals ===
Score and result list Estonia's goal tally first.

#	Date	Venue	Opponent	Score	Result	Competition
1	13 November 1996	Estadi Communal, Andorra la Vella, Andorra	Andorra	2–1	6–1	Friendly
2	13 November 1996	Estadi Communal, Andorra la Vella, Andorra	Andorra	3–1	6–1	Friendly
3	13 November 1996	Estadi Communal, Andorra la Vella, Andorra	Andorra	4–1	6–1	Friendly
4	13 November 1996	Estadi Communal, Andorra la Vella, Andorra	Andorra	5–1	6–1	Friendly
5	14 October 1998	Na Stínadlech, Teplice, Czech Republic	Czech Republic	1–4	1–4	UEFA Euro 2000 qualifying
6	18 November 1998	Boris Paichadze Stadium, Tbilisi, Georgia	Georgia	1–2	1–3	Friendly
Correct as of 4 July 2017

== Honours ==
=== Individual ===
- Estonian Silverball: 1996
- Meistriliiga Manager of the Month: August 2016
