= KSK Vigri Tallinn =

Estonian football club

KSK Vigri
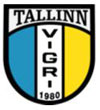
- information at time of demise
- Full name: KSK Vigri Tallinn
- Founded: 1980; 1996
- Ground: –
- Capacity: –
- Chairman: –
- Manager: (Estonia) Eduard Võrk
- League: –
- 1999: Esiliiga, 3rd
Home colours	Away colours

Vigri Tallinn was an Estonian professional football club active between 1980 and 2000.

== History ==
The club was renamed Tevalte Tallinn at the start of the 1993–94 season. In its first season under the new name, the club had all but almost secured the Meistriliiga title, when the Estonian FA disqualified the team on match-fixing allegations. The title was then decided in a championship playoff, since Norma and Flora finished level on points. But, as a protest against the disqualification of Tevalte, Norma Tallinn decided to field their youth squad and lost the game 2–5. The match-fixing allegations were never proven and the club's Meistriliiga status was restored for the 1995–96 season, by FIFA decision. The history of the original Vigri, however, ended the same year, when the club was acquired by AS Marlekor, the same company that privatized "Tallinn's furniture and wood veneer factory" (abbreviated simply as TVMK in Estonian). Marlekor renamed the club, "Tevalte-Marlekor". The "Tevalte" part was dropped from the name a year later.

The club was resurrected in 1996 in the Estonian III liiga, under the name Vigri. KSK Vigri enjoyed two successive promotions and even played in the Meistriliiga promotion playoff in 1998, where they were beaten by Eesti Põlevkivi Jõhvi with a 0–2 aggregate scoreline.

In 2000, the new owners moved the club to Maardu, a small industrial town near Tallinn, and renamed it FK Maardu, putting an end to the history of Vigri.

=== Name history ===
- Vigri Tallinn (1980 -198?)
- Vigri-Marat Tallinn (198? – 1991)
- Vigri Tallinn (1991–1993)
- Tevalte Tallinn (1993–1995)
- Vigri Tallinn (1996–1999)
