= Maksim Gruznov =

Estonian footballer

Personal information
- Full name: Maksim Gruznov
- Date of birth: 21 April 1974 (age 52)
- Place of birth: Narva, then part of Estonian SSR, Soviet Union
- Height: 1.86 m (6 ft 1 in)
- Position: Striker

Youth career
- 1990–1992: Narva Trans

Senior career*
Years	Team	Apps	(Gls)
1992–1993	Narva Trans	27	(22)
1993–1998	Tevalte/Lantana	91	(47)
1999–2008	Narva Trans	272	(200)
2009–2010	Sillamäe Kalev	32	(9)
2010–2012	Narva Trans	72	(26)
Total		494	(304)
- * Club domestic league appearances and goals as of 3 November 2012

Maksim Gruznov (Russian: Максим Грузнов) (born 21 April 1974 in Narva) is a retired Estonian football striker.

Gruznov became the Meistriliiga top goalscorer in 1993/94 and then repeated his success in 2001 and 2006 seasons.

Gruznov is the Meistriliiga all-time top scorer with 304 goals. He was also the appearance leader before Stanislav Kitto beat it.

== Honours ==
Lantana Tallinn

- Estonian Top Division: 1995–96, 1996–97
- Estonian SuperCup: 1997–98

Trans Narva

- Estonian Cup: 2000–01
- Estonian SuperCup: 2007, 2008

Individual

- Meistriliiga top scorer: 1993–94, 2001, 2006
