= Tartu FC Merkuur =

Estonian football club

- Full name: Tartu Football Club Merkuur
- Founded: 2013; 12 years ago
- Ground: Kambja Stadium
- League: II Liiga East/North
- 2016: II Liiga East/North, 1st
Home colours	Away colours

Tartu FC Merkuur is an Estonian amateur football club founded in 2013 and located in Tartu. The club currently plays in the II Liiga, the fourth tier of Estonian football. Their home ground since their formation has been Kambja Stadium.

== History ==
Merkuur began playing in the Estonian football league system in 2013 season. Merkuur's debut in IV Liiga was a success, they earned promotion on the first attempt. In 2015, they were promoted again to the II Liiga.

=== Current squad ===
As of 29 August 2016.

Note: Flags indicate national team as defined under FIFA eligibility rules; some limited exceptions apply. Players may hold more than one non-FIFA nationality.

No.	Pos.	Nation	Player
1	MF	(Estonia) EST	Maksim Babjak (on loan from Legion)
2	DF	(Estonia) EST	Deniss Bekker
3	MF	(Latvia) LVA	Aleksejs Derjabins
4	MF	(Estonia) EST	Roman Dõhne
5		(Estonia) EST	Erik Grigorjev
6	FW	(Estonia) EST	Vladislav Gussev
7	DF	(Estonia) EST	Martin Haljak
8	DF	(Estonia) EST	Roman Kalinin
9		(Estonia) EST	Georg Koros
10	MF	(Estonia) EST	Ilja Kozõrev
11		(Estonia) EST	Anton Laponogov
12		(Estonia) EST	Devid Lehter

No.	Pos.	Nation	Player
13	FW	(Estonia) EST	Marek Naal (on loan from Tammeka)
14		(Estonia) EST	Rain Näkk
15	FW	(Estonia) EST	Artur Pinajev
16	MF	(Estonia) EST	Aleksandr Pruttšenko
17	GK	(Estonia) EST	Sergei Serdjuk
18	MF	(Estonia) EST	Valeri Šabanov
19	DF	(Estonia) EST	Jevgeni Šatalin
20	FW	(Estonia) EST	Marek Šatov (on loan from Lokomotiv)
21		(Estonia) EST	Žann Šmidt
22	GK	(Estonia) EST	Sergei Zadniprjanets (on loan from Legion)
23		(Estonia) EST	Andrei Tjunin
24	MF	(Estonia) EST	Vladislav Vallades

=== League and Cup ===
Season	Division	Pos	Pld	W	D	L	GF	GA	GD	Pts	Top goalscorer	Cup
2013	IV Liiga S	5	20	11	3	6	42	35	+7	36	Artur Pinajev (12)	Second round
2014	III Liiga S	7	22	9	2	11	39	39	0	29	Artur Pinajev (22)	Second round
2015	III Liiga S	1	22	19	2	1	101	25	+76	59	Vladislav Gussev (31)	Third round
2016	II Liiga E/N	1	22	18	4	4	99	47	+52	58	Marek Šatov (46)	Third round
2017	II Liiga E/N	4	22	14	4	8	81	68	+13	46	Vladislav Gussev (22)	-
