= Tartu JK Merkuur =

Estonian football club

- Full name: Football Club Merkuur Tartu
- Founded: 1990
- Dissolved: 2006
- Ground: Tamme Staadion, Tartu
- Capacity: 2000
Home colours	Away colours

JK Maag club logo

Tartu JK Merkuur was an Estonian football club based in Tartu. Merkuur was one of the founding members of the Meistriliiga, the top-tier of Estonian football. 2006, the last year of its existence, the club was known as JK Maag for sponsorship reasons. After finishing 5th in the Meistriliiga, the club merged with city rivals Tammeka under the name Tartu JK Maag Tammeka. They played their home matches in Tamme Stadium.

== Merkuur Tartu in Estonian Football ==
Year	League	Position	Goals +/-	Points
1992	I	7	-19	1
92/93	I	10	-46	12
93/94	I	10	-89	5
94/95	II	4	-7	16
95/96	III	3	+4	11
96/97	III	1	+18	29
97/98	II	4	+2	18
1998	II	7	-10	15
1999	III	2		
2000	II	6	-20	34
2001	II	4	+22	46
2002	II	5	-26	33
2003	II	6	-29	25
2004	I	5	-11	35
2005	I	6	-34	40
2006*	I	5	-3	48

* As Jk Maag Tartu
