= Sergei Bragin =

Estonian footballer

Personal information
- Full name: Sergei Bragin
- Date of birth: 19 March 1967 (age 59)
- Place of birth: Tallinn, then part of Estonian SSR, Soviet Union
- Height: 1.82 m (6 ft 0 in)
- Position: Center midfielder

Senior career*
Years	Team	Apps	(Gls)
1985	Sport Tallinn	26	(0)
1985–1988	Norma Tallinn	25	(9)
1989	Sport Tallinn	36	(3)
1990–1993	Norma Tallinn	69	(68)
1993	Tevalte Tallinn	9	(8)
1994	Kauhajoen Karhu	8	(7)
1994–1997	Lantana Tallinn	52	(31)
1997	Sadam Tallinn	4	(1)
1997–1999	SV Sottegem	43	(18)
1999–2002	Levadia Maardu	68	(22)
2002	TP-55 Seinäjoki	17	(3)
2003–2006	Ajax Lasnamäe	63	(13)
2007–2010	FC Atletik	30	(12)
2012	Tallinna FC Akhtamar		

International career
1993	Estonia	12	(3)
- * Club domestic league appearances and goals

Sergei Bragin (born 19 March 1967) is a former Estonian professional footballer. He was playing the position of central midfielder and spent most of his playing career in the Meistriliiga.
