= JK Eesti Põlevkivi Jõhvi =

Estonian football club

- information at time of demise
- Full name: Jalgpalliklubi Eesti Põlevkivi Jõhvi
- Founded: 1974
- Dissolved: 1999
- Ground: Jõhvi linnastaadion, Jõhvi
- Capacity: 2,000
- Chairman: –
- Manager: –
- League: –
- 1999: Meistriliiga, 8th
Home colours	Away colours

JK Eesti Põlevkivi Jõhvi was an Estonian football club based in Jõhvi and was founded in 1974.

EP Jõhvi became the first Estonian runner-up after the Soviet Union collapse and also they were runners-up in the Estonian Cup 1996.

== Eesti Põlevkivi Jõhvi in Estonian football ==
Year	League	Position	Goals +/-	Points
1992	I	2	+9	10
1992–93	I	4	+33	32
1993–94	I	6	+23	24
1994–95	I	5	-9	18
1995–96	I	7	-4	17
1996–97	I	7	-10	13
1997–98	I	7	-12	11
1998	I	7	-34	6
1999	I	8	-69	13

Eesti Põlevkivi Jõhvi dissolved and were replaced by Muhumaa JK (they play their home matches in Kuressaare).
