= Marek Lemsalu =

Estonian footballer

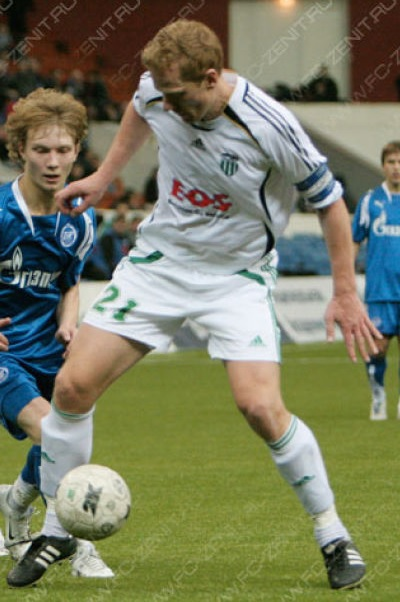
- Lemsalu with Levadia in 2008

Personal information
- Full name: Marek Lemsalu
- Date of birth: 24 November 1972 (age 53)
- Place of birth: Pärnu, then part of Estonian SSR, Soviet Union
- Height: 1.91 m (6 ft 3 in)
- Position: Centre-back

Senior career*
Years	Team	Apps	(Gls)
1988–1989	Pärnu KEK	29	(2)
1989	Eesti Tööstus/Flora	1	(0)
1989–1990	Sport Tallinn	26	(0)
1990–1991	Pärnu Kalakombinaat/MEK	39	(4)
1992–1999	Flora	119	(17)
1996–1997	→ Mainz 05 (loan)	16	(0)
1998	→ Kuressaare (loan)	1	(0)
1999	Strømsgodset	8	(0)
2000	Tulevik	20	(6)
2001	Start	29	(2)
2002–2005	Bryne	110	(10)
2006–2008	Levadia	91	(15)
Total		489	(56)

International career
1992–2007	Estonia	86	(3)
- * Club domestic league appearances and goals

Marek Lemsalu (born 24 November 1972) is an Estonian former professional footballer. He played as a centre-back for Pärnu KEK, Sport Tallinn, Pärnu Kalakombinaat/MEK, Flora, Mainz 05, Kuressaare, Strømsgodset, Tulevik, Start, Bryne and Levadia.

Lemsalu made his debut for the Estonia national team in 1992. He was captain in 1995 and 1996, and made a total of 86 appearances for the team before retiring in 2007.

Lemsalu was named Estonian Footballer of the Year in 1996 and Meistriliiga Player of the Year in 2006.

== Club career ==
=== Early career ===
Lemsalu started playing football in 1988 for his hometown club Pärnu KEK, before moving to Soviet Second League club Sport Tallinn in 1989. In 1990, he returned to Pärnu where he played for Pärnu Kalakombinaat/MEK.

=== Flora ===
In 1992, Lemsalu signed for Flora of the newly formed Meistriliiga. With Flora, he won four Meistriliiga titles, in 1993–94, 1994–95, 1997–98, and 1998. In December 1997 he had a trial at English club Barnsley who were then in the Premier League, however this didn't lead to a transfer.

==== Mainz 05 (loan) ====
In 1996, Lemsalu joined German 2. Bundesliga side Mainz 05 on a season-long loan for a fee of EEK 1 million.

=== Strømsgodset ===
In 1999, Lemsalu signed for Norwegian Tippeligaen side Strømsgodset.

=== Tulevik ===
In 2000, Lemsalu returned to Estonia and joined Tulevik.

=== Start ===
In 2001, Lemsalu signed for Norwegian 1. divisjon side Start. He helped Start to finish the 2001 season as runners-up and earn their promotion to the Tippeligaen.

=== Bryne ===
On 11 December 2002, Lemsalu signed a three-year contract with Norwegian Tippeligaen side Bryne.

=== Levadia ===
On 17 January 2006, Lemsalu returned to the Meistriliiga, joining Levadia. Levadia reached the first round in the 2006–07 UEFA Cup, but lost to Newcastle United 1–3 on aggregate. In 2006, Lemsalu succeeded Konstantin Vassiljev as team captain. He won the 2006 Meistriliiga title and was named Meistriliiga Player of the Year. He won two more successive Meistriliiga titles in 2007 and 2008. Lemsalu retired from professional football after the 2008 season, playing his last match on 15 November 2008 against TVMK.

== International career ==
Lemsalu made his international debut for the Estonia national team on 11 July 1992 in a 1–1 draw against Lithuania in the 1992 Baltic Cup. He was team captain in 1995 and 1996. He scored his first goal for Estonia on 22 June 1997 in a 4–1 home win against Andorra in a friendly. Lemsalu retired from international football on 28 March 2007, after a UEFA Euro 2008 qualifying match against Israel. He made a total of 86 appearances and scored 3 goals.

== Personal life ==
Lemsalu's daughter Liis Lemsalu is a singer and the winner of the fourth season of Eesti otsib superstaari (Estonian version of Idols).

== Career statistics ==
=== Club ===
Club	Season	League			Cup		Europe		Other (Note: Includes the Commonwealth of Independent States Cup, Estonian Supercup, Baltic League and Livonia Cup)		Total	
Club	Season	Division	Apps	Goals	Apps	Goals	Apps	Goals	Apps	Goals	Apps	Goals
Pärnu KEK	1988	2. liiga	12	0			—		—		12	0
Pärnu KEK	1989	2. liiga	17	2			—		—		17	2
Pärnu KEK	Total		29	2			—		—		29	2
Eesti Tööstus/Flora	1989	Kõrgliiga	1	0			—		—		1	0
Sport Tallinn	1989	Soviet Second League	4	0			—		—		4	0
Sport Tallinn	1990	Baltic League	22	0			—		—		22	0
Sport Tallinn	Total		26	0			—		—		26	0
Pärnu Kalakombinaat/MEK	1990	Kõrgliiga	16	1			—		—		16	1
Pärnu Kalakombinaat/MEK	1991	Kõrgliiga	23	3			—		—		23	3
Pärnu Kalakombinaat/MEK	Total		39	4			—		—		39	4
Flora	1992	Meistriliiga	8	1			—		—		8	1
Flora	1992–93	Meistriliiga	18	5			—		—		18	5
Flora	1993–94	Meistriliiga	15	1			—		—		15	1
Flora	1994–95	Meistriliiga	19	3			1	0	3	0	23	3
Flora	1995–96	Meistriliiga	24	3			2	0	3	0	29	3
Flora	1996–97	Meistriliiga	4	1			2	0	—		6	1
Flora	1997–98	Meistriliiga	18	1			2	0	—		20	1
Flora	1998	Meistriliiga	5	0			1	0	0	0	6	0
Flora	1999	Meistriliiga	8	2			1	0	—		9	2
Flora	Total		119	17			9	0	6	0	134	17
Mainz 05 (loan)	1996–97	2. Bundesliga	16	0	0	0	—		—		16	0
Kuressaare (loan)	1998	Esiliiga	1	0	0	0	—		0	0	1	0
Strømsgodset	1999	Tippeligaen	8	0	0	0	—		0	0	8	0
Tulevik	2000	Meistriliiga	20	6			1	0	0	0	21	6
Start	2001	1. divisjon	29	2	3	0	—		—		32	2
Bryne	2002	Tippeligaen	26	4	3	1	—		—		29	5
Bryne	2003	Tippeligaen	25	1	3	0	—		—		28	1
Bryne	2004	1. divisjon	30	1	5	0	—		—		35	1
Bryne	2005	1. divisjon	29	4	4	0	—		—		33	4
Bryne	Total		110	10	15	1	—		—		125	11
Levadia	2006	Meistriliiga	33	5			6	0	—		39	5
Levadia	2007	Meistriliiga	30	6			4	0	7	0	41	6
Levadia	2008	Meistriliiga	28	4			2	0	7	1	37	5
Levadia	Total		91	15			12	0	14	1	111	16
Career total			489	56	18	1	22	0	20	1	549	58

=== International ===
National team	Year	Apps	Goals
Estonia
Estonia	1992	1	0
Estonia	1993	6	0
Estonia	1994	12	0
Estonia	1995	7	0
Estonia	1996	10	0
Estonia	1997	13	1
Estonia	1998	5	0
Estonia	1999	10	0
Estonia	2000	9	0
Estonia	2001	3	0
Estonia	2003	6	1
Estonia	2004	2	1
Estonia	2007	2	0
Total		86	3

=== International goals ===
Estonia score listed first, score column indicates score after each Lemsalu goal.

No.	Date	Venue	Opponent	Score	Result	Competition
1	22 June 1997	Kuressaare Linnastaadion, Kuressaare, Estonia	Andorra	2–0	4–1	Friendly
2	20 August 2003	A. Le Coq Arena, Tallinn, Estonia	Poland	1–2	1–2	Friendly
3	14 February 2004	Ta' Qali National Stadium, Ta' Qali, Malta	Belarus	2–0	2–1	2004 Malta International Tournament

== Honours ==
=== Club ===
Pärnu Kalakombinaat/MEK

- Estonian Cup: 1990

Flora

- Meistriliiga: 1993–94, 1994–95, 1997–98, 1998
- Estonian Cup: 1994–95

Levadia

- Meistriliiga: 2006, 2007, 2008
- Estonian Cup: 2006–07

=== Individual ===
- Estonian Footballer of the Year: 1996
- Meistriliiga Player of the Year: 2006
