= Enar Jääger =

Estonian footballer (born 1984)

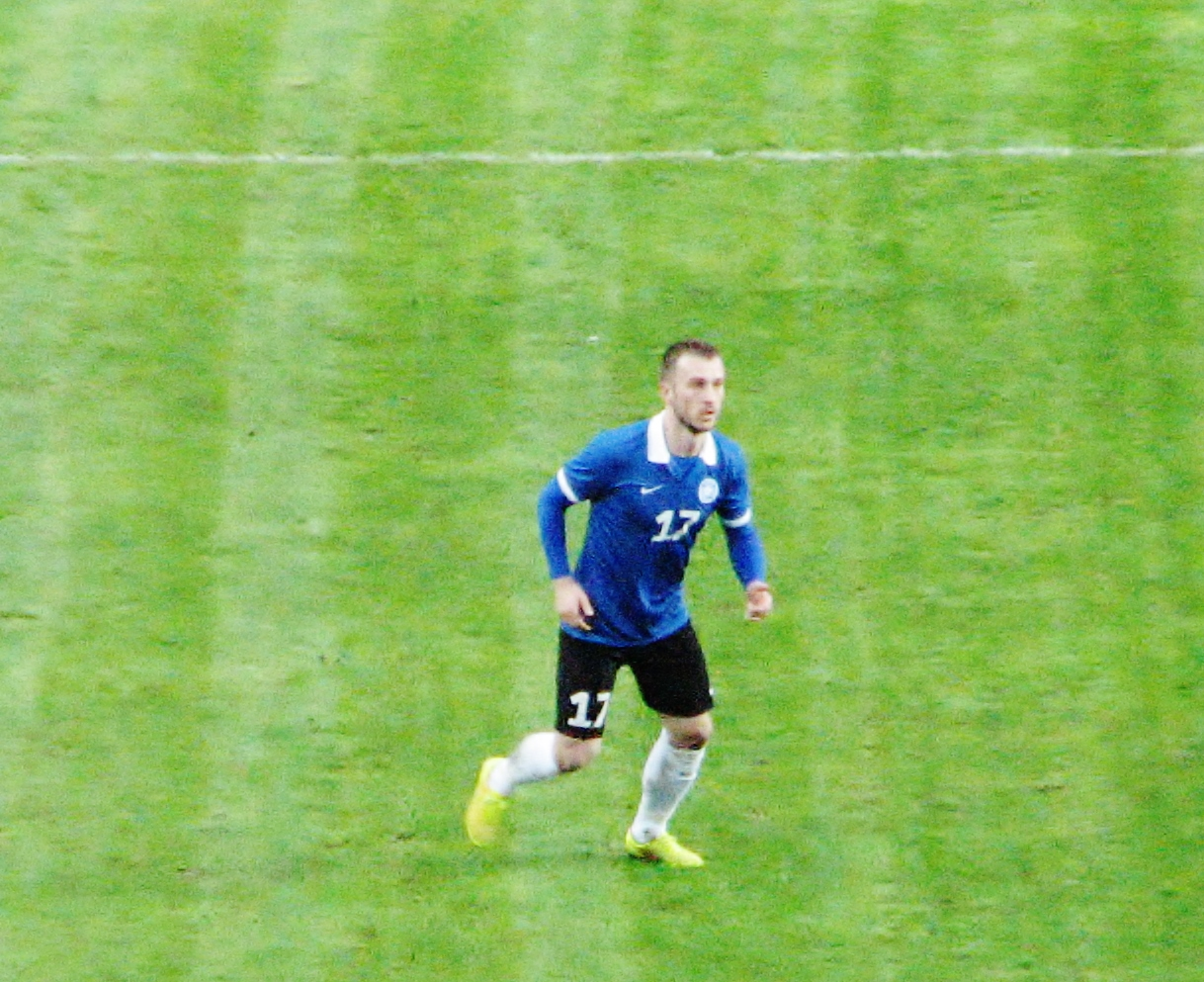
- Jääger with Estonia in 2015

Personal information
- Date of birth: 18 November 1984 (age 42)
- Place of birth: Kohila, Estonia
- Height: 1.78 m (5 ft 10 in)
- Position: Defender

Youth career
- Flora Kehtna

Senior career*
Years	Team	Apps	(Gls)
2000	Lelle	25	(0)
2000–2003	Tervis Pärnu	8	(0)
2000–2002	Valga	34	(1)
2001–2005	Flora	48	(2)
2005–2007	Torpedo Moscow	35	(0)
2007–2009	Aalesund	58	(1)
2009–2010	Ascoli	5	(0)
2010–2012	Aalesund	78	(2)
2013–2014	Lierse	22	(0)
2015	Flora	16	(0)
2015–2018	Vålerenga	50	(5)
2017–2018	Vålerenga 2	4	(0)
2019–2020	Flora	10	(0)
2019	→ Flora U21	2	(0)
Total		395	(11)

International career
2000	Estonia U16	2	(0)
2001	Estonia U19	4	(0)
2002–2003	Estonia U20	2	(0)
2001–2006	Estonia U21	7	(0)
2002–2017	Estonia	127	(0)
- * Club domestic league appearances and goals

Enar Jääger (born 18 November 1984) is an Estonian former professional footballer who played as a defender.

== Club career ==
=== Flora ===
Jääger made his senior league debut in the Esiliiga on 2 April 2000, playing for Flora affiliated Lelle in a 3–1 home loss to Merkuur Tartu. In December 2000, he moved to Flora's reserve side Valga. Jääger made his Flora – and Meistriliiga – debut on 4 November 2001, in a 3–0 away victory over Lootus. He won the Meistriliiga title in the 2003 season.

=== Torpedo Moscow ===
On 3 February 2005, Jääger signed a three-year contract with Russian Premier League club Torpedo Moscow for an undisclosed fee, becoming third Estonian player in the club after Andres Oper and Andrei Stepanov. He made his debut in Russian Premier League on 13 March, in a 3–1 home win over Rostov.

=== Aalesund ===
On 8 March 2007, Jääger signed a two-and-a-half-year contract with Norwegian club Aalesund for an undisclosed fee. He made his debut in the Tippeligaen on 16 May 2007, in a 4–0 away victory over Strømsgodset.

=== Ascoli ===
On 19 July 2009, Jääger signed for Serie B club Ascoli on a three-year deal. He made his debut in the Serie B on 21 August 2009, in 1–1 home draw against Gallipoli. Jääger failed to become a regular starter for Ascoli and was released by the club on 31 January 2010, after making just five league appearances.

=== Return to Aalesund ===
After rejecting an offer from Major League Soccer club New York Red Bulls, Jääger returned to Norway, where he signed a two-year contract with Aalesund on 5 March 2010. On 6 November 2011, Jääger assisted the opening goal in Aalesund's 2–1 victory over Brann in the Norwegian Cup final, winning his first trophy with the club. He didn't extend his contract after the 2011 season.

On 5 January 2012, Jääger passed a medical examination at Ekstraklasa club Lechia Gdańsk, but rejected the contract offer to pursue other options. He then had a trial with the Scottish Premier League champions Rangers. Rangers manager Ally McCoist was impressed with Jääger and was keen on signing him, but the player had to leave the club without an offer as Rangers failed to reduce their wage bill in order to make room for new players. Despite interest from Championship sides Crystal Palace and Leeds United, and League One side Charlton Athletic, Jääger failed to secure a contract by March 2012.

On 13 March 2012, Jääger signed a one-year contract with Aalesund, after receiving an improved offer from his former club.

=== Lierse ===
On 15 July 2013, Jääger signed a one-year contract with Belgian Pro League club Lierse, with an option to extend it for another year. He made his debut for the club on 27 July, in a 2–1 home loss to Zulte Waregem.

=== Return to Flora ===
In December 2014, Jääger joined the Flora first-team squad for training sessions. On 5 March 2015, he signed a one-year contract with the club. Jääger was named club captain ahead of the 2015 season.

=== Vålerenga ===
On 18 August 2015, Jääger signed for Tippeligaen club Vålerenga for the remainder of the 2015 season. He made his Vålerenga debut on 28 August, in 2–0 away loss to his former club Aalesund. On 4 January 2016, Jääger extended his contract for a year. On 30 March 2017, he extended his contract for another year.

=== Second return to Flora ===
On 14 June 2019, Jääger once again returned to Flora, signing a contract for the rest of the season. Jääger was part of Flora's championship-winning 2019 Meistriliiga season, repeating as champions of the COVID-19 pandemic shortened 2020 Meistriliiga season. Jääger announced his retirement on 5 December 2020, following the club's final game of the season.

== International career ==
Jääger began his youth career in 2000 with the Estonia under-16 team. He also represented the under-19, under-20, and under-21 national sides.

Jääger made his senior international debut for Estonia on 12 October 2002, when he came on as a 69th-minute substitute for Marko Kristal in a 3–2 home victory over New Zealand in a friendly. He made his 100th appearance for Estonia on 19 November 2013, a day after his 29th birthday, in a 3–0 friendly away win over Liechtenstein.

== Career statistics ==
=== Club ===
As of 2 December 2020

Appearances and goals by club, season and competition
Club	Season	League			Cup (Note: Includes the Estonian Cup, Russian Cup, and Norwegian Cup)		Europe		Other		Total	
Club	Season	Division	Apps	Goals	Apps	Goals	Apps	Goals	Apps	Goals	Apps	Goals
Lelle	2000	Esiliiga	25	0			—		—		25	0
Tervis Pärnu	2000	Esiliiga	2	0			—		—		2	0
Tervis Pärnu	2003	Esiliiga	6	0	0	0	—		0	0	6	0
Tervis Pärnu	Total		8	0	0	0	—		0	0	8	0
Valga	2001	Esiliiga	21	1	1	0	—		1 (Note: Appearance in Esiliiga promotion play-offs)	0	23	1
Valga	2002	Esiliiga	13	0	0	0	—		—		13	0
Valga	Total		34	1	1	0	—		1	0	36	1
Flora	2001	Meistriliiga	1	0	0	0	0	0	—		1	0
Flora	2003	Meistriliiga	22	1	3	0	2 (Note: Appearances in UEFA Champions League)	0	1 (Note: Appearance in Estonian Supercup)	0	28	1
Flora	2004	Meistriliiga	25	1	5	0	2	0	1	0	33	1
Flora	Total		48	2	8	0	4	0	2	0	62	2
Torpedo Moscow	2005	Russian Premier League	13	0	3	0	—		—		16	0
Torpedo Moscow	2006	Russian Premier League	22	0	6	0	—		—		28	0
Torpedo Moscow	Total		35	0	9	0	—		—		44	0
Aalesund	2007	Tippeligaen	19	0	4	0	—		—		23	0
Aalesund	2008	Tippeligaen	23	1	3	0	—		2 (Note: Appearances in Tippeligaen relegation play-offs)	0	28	1
Aalesund	2009	Tippeligaen	16	0	3	0	—		—		19	0
Aalesund	Total		58	1	10	0	—		2	0	70	1
Ascoli	2009–10	Serie B	5	0	0	0	—		—		5	0
Aalesund	2010	Tippeligaen	26	0	2	0	1 (Note: Appearance(s) in UEFA Europa League)	0	0	0	29	0
Aalesund	2011	Tippeligaen	27	2	5	0	7	0	—		39	2
Aalesund	2012	Tippeligaen	25	0	1	0	2	0	—		28	0
Aalesund	Total		78	2	8	0	10	0	0	0	96	2
Lierse	2013–14	Belgian Pro League	22	0	0	0	—		—		22	0
Flora	2015	Meistriliiga	16	0	3	0	2	0	—		21	0
Flora	2019	Meistriliiga	5	0	1	0	—		—		6	0
Flora	2020	Meistriliiga	5	0	0	0	—		—		5	0
Vålerenga	2015	Tippeligaen	9	2	0	0	—		—		9	2
Vålerenga	2016	Tippeligaen	11	1	3	0	—		—		14	1
Vålerenga	2017	Eliteserien	27	2	5	1	—		—		32	3
Vålerenga	2018	Eliteserien	3	0	0	0	—		—		3	0
Vålerenga	Total		50	5	8	1	—		—		58	6
Vålerenga 2	2017	2. divisjon	1	0	—		—		—		1	0
Vålerenga 2	2018	2. divisjon	3	0	—		—		—		3	0
Vålerenga 2	Total		4	0	—		—		—		4	0
Flora U21	2019	Esiliiga	2	0	—		—		—		2	0
Total			395	11	48	1	16	0	5	0	464	12

=== International ===
Appearances and goals by national team and year
National team	Year	Apps	Goals
Estonia	2002	1	0
Estonia	2003	9	0
Estonia	2004	12	0
Estonia	2005	11	0
Estonia	2006	7	0
Estonia	2007	10	0
Estonia	2008	9	0
Estonia	2009	10	0
Estonia	2010	5	0
Estonia	2011	12	0
Estonia	2012	5	0
Estonia	2013	10	0
Estonia	2014	11	0
Estonia	2015	8	0
Estonia	2016	2	0
Estonia	2017	5	0
Total		127	0

== Honours ==
Valga

- Esiliiga: 2002

Flora

- Meistriliiga: 2003, 2019, 2020
- Estonian Supercup: 2003, 2004

Aalesund

- Norwegian Cup: 2011

== See also ==
- List of men's footballers with 100 or more international caps
