= Raio Piiroja =

Estonian footballer (born 1979)

Personal information
- Date of birth: 11 July 1979 (age 47)
- Place of birth: Pärnu, then part of Estonian SSR, Soviet Union
- Height: 1.90 m (6 ft 3 in)
- Position: Centre-back

Youth career
- Rivaal
- Pärnu

Senior career*
Years	Team	Apps	(Gls)
1995–1996	Pärnu/Kalev	8	(1)
1996–1997	Lelle		
1997–1999	Lelle	22	(3)
1999–2004	Flora	102	(17)
2000	Tervis Pärnu	1	(0)
2001	Valga	1	(0)
2003	→ Vålerenga (loan)	11	(1)
2004–2011	Fredrikstad	159	(12)
2011–2012	Vitesse	2	(0)
2012	Flora	0	(0)
2013	Chengdu Blades	18	(1)
2014	Flora	0	(0)
2015	Pärnu Linnameeskond	0	(0)
Total		324	(35)

International career
1993	Estonia U16	2	(0)
1996–1997	Estonia U19	7	(0)
1997–1998	Estonia U21	13	(0)
1998–2015	Estonia	114	(8)
- * Club domestic league appearances and goals

Raio Piiroja (born 11 July 1979) is an Estonian former professional footballer. He played as a centre-back for Pärnu/Kalev, Lelle, Flora, Vålerenga, Fredrikstad, Vitesse and Chengdu Blades.

Piiroja made his international debut for the Estonia national team on 21 November 1998 in a friendly against Armenia. He was team captain from 2008 to 2011, and made a total of 113 appearances for Estonia before retiring in 2013. On 31 March 2015, Piiroja made his 114th and final appearance for Estonia in his testimonial match against Iceland.

Known for his leadership and ability in the air, Piiroja was named Estonian Footballer of the Year five times, in 2002, 2006, 2007, 2008 and 2009.

== Club career ==
=== Early career ===
Piiroja started playing football with his hometown club Rivaal, before moving to Pärnu. He made his Meistriliiga debut on 16 July 1995, five days after his 16th birthday, against Eesti Põlevkivi in the opening match of the season. 10 days later, on 26 July 1995, Piiroja scored his first goal in the Meistriliiga in a 4–2 defeat against Narva Trans and became the youngest goalscorer in Meistriliiga history at the age of 16 years and 15 days.

=== Flora ===
In 1996, Piiroja joined Lelle, a team affiliated with Flora. He played for Lelle from 1997 until 1999, when he was promoted to Flora's first team. With Flora, Piiroja won his first Meistriliiga title in the 2001 season. He won his second consecutive Meistriliiga title in the 2002 season and was named Estonian Player of the Year for the first time.

==== Vålerenga (loan) ====
In 2003, Piiroja joined Norwegian Tippeligaen side Vålerenga on loan.

=== Fredrikstad ===
In August 2004, Piiroja signed a contract with Tippeligaen side Fredrikstad. On 12 November 2006, he scored twice in the 2006 Norwegian Football Cup Final against Sandefjord as Fredrikstad won 3–0. In 2007, Piiroja extended his contract for four more years. During his time with Fredrikstad, Piiroja won four consecutive Estonian Player of the Year awards, in 2006, 2007, 2008 and 2009. Fredrikstad finished the 2009 season in 14th place and were relegated from the Tippeligaen after a 2–0 loss against Sarpsborg 08 in the play-offs. Fredrikstad returned to the Norwegian top division after a season, with Piiroja scoring in both legs of an 8–1 aggregate win against Hønefoss in the promotion play-offs.

=== Vitesse ===
On 31 August 2011, Piiroja signed a one-year contract, with an option of extension for another season, at Eredivisie side Vitesse.

=== Chengdu Blades ===
On 18 February 2013, Piiroja signed for China League One team Chengdu Blades.

== International career ==
Piiroja made his international debut for the Estonia national team on 21 November 1998, in a 2–1 loss against Armenia in a friendly, replacing Viktor Alonen in the 85th minute of the match. Piiroja soon established himself as Estonia's first choice centre-back. In 2008, he succeeded Martin Reim as team captain. On 25 March 2011, Piiroja made his 100th appearance in a 2–0 win over Uruguay in a friendly. He was sent off by referee Viktor Kassai in the 76th minute of the first leg of the UEFA Euro 2012 qualifying play-off against Republic of Ireland, which Estonia went on to lose 5–1 on aggregate. Piiroja ended his international career in October 2013, but made one final appearance for Estonia on 31 March 2015, in his testimonial match against Iceland. He made a total of 114 appearances and scored 8 goals.

== Personal life ==
Piiroja married his long-time girlfriend Marje in 2005. They divorced in 2015. Outside of football, Piiroja enjoys skiing and is an avid fisherman.

On 1 June 2016, Piiroja released his autobiography, Ninamees Raio Piiroja, õhuvõitleja, written by sports journalist Gunnar Press.

== Career statistics ==
=== Club ===
Appearances and goals by club, season and competition
Club	Season	League			Cup		Continental		Other (Note: Includes the Estonian Supercup, Commonwealth of Independent States Cup and Tippeligaen play-offs)		Total	
Club	Season	Division	Apps	Goals	Apps	Goals	Apps	Goals	Apps	Goals	Apps	Goals
Pärnu/Kalev	1995–96	Meistriliiga	8	1			—		—		8	1
Lelle	1996–97	Esiliiga					—		—			
Lelle	1997–98	Meistriliiga	9	0			—		—		9	0
Lelle	1998	Meistriliiga	6	1			—		—		6	1
Lelle	1999	Meistriliiga	7	2			—		—		7	2
Lelle	Total		22	3			—		—		22	3
Flora	1999	Meistriliiga	11	2			2	0	1	0	14	2
Flora	2000	Meistriliiga	26	1			2	0	—		28	1
Flora	2001	Meistriliiga	24	2			1	0	—		25	2
Flora	2002	Meistriliiga	26	9			2	0	0	0	25	2
Flora	2004	Meistriliiga	15	3			2	0	3	0	25	2
Flora	Total		102	17			9	0	4	0	115	17
Tervis Pärnu	2000	Esiliiga	1	0			—		—		1	0
Valga	2001	Esiliiga	1	0			—		—		1	0
Vålerenga (loan)	2003	Tippeligaen	11	1	3	0	3	0	2	1	19	2
Fredrikstad	2004	Tippeligaen	9	0			—		—		9	0
Fredrikstad	2005	Tippeligaen	12	1			—		—		12	1
Fredrikstad	2006	Tippeligaen	25	0	2	3	—		—		27	4
Fredrikstad	2007	Tippeligaen	22	3			2	0	—		24	3
Fredrikstad	2008	Tippeligaen	23	2			—		—		23	2
Fredrikstad	2009	Tippeligaen	25	2			2	1	1	0	28	3
Fredrikstad	2010	Adeccoligaen	28	4			—		3	2	31	6
Fredrikstad	2011	Tippeligaen	15	0			—		—		16	0
Fredrikstad	Total		159	12	24	3	4	1	4	2	191	15
Vitesse	2011–12	Eredivisie	2	0	0	0	—		0	0	2	0
Chengdu Blades	2013	China League One	18	1			—		—		18	1
Career total			324	35	27	3	16	1	10	3	377	42

=== International ===
Appearances and goals by national team and year
National team	Year	Apps	Goals
Estonia	1998	1	0
Estonia	1999	5	1
Estonia	2000	6	1
Estonia	2001	13	1
Estonia	2002	9	0
Estonia	2003	8	0
Estonia	2004	12	1
Estonia	2005	6	0
Estonia	2006	5	0
Estonia	2007	9	2
Estonia	2008	8	0
Estonia	2009	10	1
Estonia	2010	7	1
Estonia	2011	9	0
Estonia	2012	1	0
Estonia	2013	4	0
Estonia	2014	0	0
Estonia	2015	1	0
Total		114	8

Scores and results list Estonia's goal tally first, score column indicates score after each Piiroja goal.

List of international goals scored by Raio Piiroja
No.	Date	Venue	Cap	Opponent	Score	Result	Competition
1	4 September 1999	Svangaskarð, Toftir, Faroe Islands	4	Faroe Islands	2–0	2–0	UEFA Euro 2000 qualifying
2	11 June 2000	Kadriorg Stadium, Tallinn, Estonia	9	Georgia	1–0	1–0	Friendly
3	28 March 2001	Tsirion Stadium, Limassol, Cyprus	14	Cyprus	2–2	2–2	2002 FIFA World Cup qualification
4	16 February 2004	Ta' Qali National Stadium, La Valletta, Malta	44	Malta	2–2	2–5	2014 Malta International Tournament
5	22 August 2007	A. Le Coq Arena, Tallinn, Estonia	68	Andorra	1–0	2–1	UEFA Euro 2008 qualifying
6	12 September 2007	Skopje City Stadium, Skopje, Macedonia	70	North Macedonia	1–0	1–1	UEFA Euro 2008 qualifying
7	14 October 2009	A. Le Coq Arena, Tallinn, Estonia	91	Belgium	1–0	2–0	2010 FIFA World Cup qualification
8	11 August 2010	A. Le Coq Arena, Tallinn, Estonia	97	Faroe Islands	2–1	2–1	UEFA Euro 2012 qualifying

== Honours ==
Flora

- Meistriliiga: 2001, 2002
- Estonian Supercup: 2002

Fredrikstad

- Norwegian Cup: 2006

Individual

- Estonian Footballer of the Year: 2002, 2006, 2007, 2008, 2009
- Order of the White Star, 5th Class

== See also ==
- List of men's footballers with 100 or more international caps
