= Erko Saviauk =

Estonian footballer and manager

Personal information
- Full name: Erko Saviauk
- Date of birth: 20 October 1977 (age 49)
- Place of birth: Viljandi, then part of Estonian SSR, Soviet Union
- Height: 1.81 m (5 ft 11 in)
- Position: Left-back

Youth career
- 1988–1995: Tulevik

Senior career*
Years	Team	Apps	(Gls)
1994–1995	Tulevik		
1995–2005	Flora	132	(10)
1995–1996	→ FC Lelle (loan)	19	(2)
1996–1997	→ Lelle SK (loan)	30	(1)
1998	→ Kuressaare (loan)	6	(0)
2004	→ Pärnu (loan)	2	(0)
2005–2008	TVMK	78	(5)
2009–2018	Eesti Koondis	166	(19)
Total		433	(37)

International career
1996–1998	Estonia U21	11	(0)
1997–2005	Estonia	60	(1)

Managerial career
- 2016–2017: Nõmme Kalju U21
- * Club domestic league appearances and goals

Erko Saviauk (born 20 October 1977) is an Estonian football manager and former professional player.

Saviauk played as a defender for Pärnu, Flora, Kuressaare and TVMK.

== International career ==
Saviauk made his international debut on 9 July 1997 against Lithuania. In total, he made 60 appearances and scored one goal for the Estonia national football team.

== Honours ==
Flora

- Meistriliiga: 1997–98, 2001, 2002, 2003
- Estonian Supercup: 2002, 2003, 2004

TVMK

- Meistriliiga: 2005
- Estonian Cup: 2005–06
- Estonian Supercup: 2005, 2006
