= 1998–99 Estonian Cup =

Eesti Karikas

Tournament details
- Country: Estonia
- Teams: 40

Final positions
- Champions: Levadia Maardu
- Runners-up: Tulevik

Tournament statistics
- Matches played: 45
- Goals scored: 225 (5 per match)

The 1998–99 Estonian Cup (Estonian: Eesti Karikas) was the ninth season of the Estonian football knockout tournament. Originally, winners of the cup qualified for the 1999–2000 UEFA Cup qualifying round. The defending champion, Flora, was knocked out in the semi-final against later cup winners Levadia Maardu.

The competition culminated with the final held at Valga linnastaadion, Valga on 25 May 1999 with Levadia Maardu taking the title 3–2. Since the Tallinna Sadam were placed second in the 1998 Meistriliiga and then were merged with Levadia Maardu the UEFA Cup place was also given to the third positioned team in the league.

All in all, 40 teams took part of the competition.

== First round ==
Team 1	Score	Team 2
12 August
Võru Kalev	1–4	Lasnamäe
Hiiumaa	1–6	Alko
Toompea	4–2	Lootos
Loo Auto	1–4	Rada/HKL
Kabris	0–4	Tapa
Rakvere	3–3 (a.e.t.) (5–3 p)	Flora Kehtna
13 August
Emmaste	0–2	Atli
18 August
Flora Fännklubi	0–1 (a.e.t.)	Sarma
Lasnamäe Veteranid	6–0	Concordia Tallinn

== Second round ==
Team 1	Score	Team 2
25 August
Lasnamäe Veteranid	6–0	Hiiu Kalur
26 August
Järvamaa	1–4	M.C. Tallinn
Lasnamäe	4–4 (a.e.t.) (5–4 p)	FC Lelle
Rada/HKL	1–3	Tapa
Karksi	2–3	Rakvere
Tulevik II	1–8	Alko
30 August
Sarma	3–1	Atli
Toompea		Bye

== Third round ==
Team 1	Score	Team 2
15 September
Sarma	0–2	Vigri
Lasnamäe	0–3	Kuressaare
Tapa	1–3 (a.e.t.)	Valga
Toompea	1–4	Lootus
Alko	0–2	Levadia Maardu
M.C. Tallinn	4–1	Sillamäe JK
16 September
Lasnamäe Veteranid	1–3	Narva Baltika
17 September
Rakvere	2–5	Warrior

== Fourth round ==
Team 1	Score	Team 2
11 October
Warrior	0–25	Narva Trans
M.C. Tallinn	0–2	Tallinna Sadam^{1}
Levadia Maardu^{1}	3–0	Eesti Põlevkivi Jõhvi
31 October
Vigri	1–9	Flora
Lootus	1–5	Tulevik
Narva Baltika	0–1	TVMK
8 November
Kuressaare	1–1 (a.e.t.) (5–6 p)	Lantana
Valga	1–3 (a.e.t.)	Lelle SK

Notes

- ^{1} FC Maardu and Tallinna Sadam were merged into Levadia Maardu during the winter break and in the next round Tallinna Sadam were competed as Levadia Maardu and Levadia Maardu were competed as FC Maardu.

== Quarter-finals ==
Team 1	Agg.	Team 2	1st leg	2nd leg
FC Maardu	1–23	Levadia Maardu	0–10	1–13
Tulevik	6–1	Lelle SK	0–1	6–0
Lantana	1–7	Flora	0–1	1–6
TVMK	2–2 (a)	Narva Trans	0–0	2–2

== Semi-finals ==
Team 1	Agg.	Team 2	1st leg	2nd leg
Levadia Maardu	4–3	Flora	1–1	3–2
Tulevik	1–0	TVMK	1–0	0–0

== Final ==
25 May 1999	Levadia Maardu	3–2	Tulevik	Valga
	O'Konnel-Bronin 17'; Gussev 52'; Krõlov 75'		Ustritski 15'; Allas 68'	Stadium: Valga linnastaadion Attendance: 500; Referee: Jüri Saar
