= 2002 Esiliiga =

Estonian football league season for second division

Esiliiga
- Season: 2002

The 2002 Esiliiga is the 12th season of the Esiliiga, second-highest Estonian league for association football clubs, since its establishment in 1992.

== Final table of Esiliiga season 2002 ==
Pos	Team	Pld	W	D	L	GF	GA	GD	Pts	Promotion or relegation
1	Valga (C, P)	28	26	1	1	86	20	+66	79	Promotion to Meistriliiga
2	Kuressaare (P)	28	17	2	9	82	50	+32	53	Qualification for promotion play-offs
3	Maardu	28	13	8	7	79	55	+24	47	
4	TJK	28	13	4	11	56	56	0	43	
5	Merkuur	28	10	3	15	47	73	−26	33	
6	Tammeka (R)	28	9	6	13	47	66	−19	33	Qualification for relegation play-offs
7	Elva (R)	28	5	5	18	40	61	−21	20	Relegation to II Liiga
8	Sillamäe Kalev (R)	28	3	3	22	23	79	−56	12	Relegation to II Liiga

Source: rsssf.com
Rules for classification: 1) points; 2) head-to-head points; 3) head-to-head goal difference; 4) head-to-head goals scored; 5) goal difference; 6) number of goals scored.
(C) Champions; (P) Promoted; (R) Relegated

== Promotion playoff ==
16 November 2002

Kuressaare	1 – 1	Lootus
A. Dubõkin 2'		Popov 41'

24 November 2002

Lootus	0 – 1	Kuressaare
		Õun 85'

FC Kuressaare beat FC Lootus Kohtla-Järve 2–1 on aggregate. Kuressaare promoted to Meistriliiga, Lootus relegated to Esiliiga.

== Relegation playoff ==
16 November 2002

M.C.	3 – 0	Tammeka
Goal

24 November 2002

Tammeka	2 – 3	M.C.
Goal		Goal

FC M.C. Tallinn beat JK Tammeka Tartu 6–2 on aggregate. M.C. promoted to Esiliiga, Tammeka relegated to Second Division.

== Top goalscorers ==
- 25 – Andrei Afanassov (Maardu)
- 21 – Tarmo Neemelo (Kuressaare)
- 17 – Tiit Tikenberg (Kuressaare)
- 16 – Glen Atle Larsen (Valga)
- 15 – Jarmo Ahjupera (Valga)
- 13 – Ott Meerits (Kuressaare)
- 12 – Konstantin Vassiljev (TJK)
- 11 – Joel Lindpere (Valga)
- 11 – Aivar Priidel (Maardu)
- 11 – Kristjan Tiirik (Tammeka)

== See also ==
- 2002 Meistriliiga
