= 2005–06 Estonian Cup =

Eesti Karikas

Tournament details
- Country: Estonia
- Teams: 32

Final positions
- Champions: TVMK
- Runners-up: Flora

Tournament statistics
- Matches played: 31
- Goals scored: 176 (5.68 per match)

The 2005–06 Estonian Cup (Estonian: Eesti Karikas) was the 16th season of the Estonian football knockout tournament. Originally, winners of the cup qualified for the 2006–07 UEFA Cup first qualifying round. The defending champion, Levadia, was knocked out in the second round against later cup winners TVMK.

The competition culminated with the final held at Kadriorg Stadium, Tallinn on 17 May 2006 with TVMK taking the title 1–0. Since the TVMK also win the 2005 Meistriliiga, the runners-up Flora were qualified to the UEFA Cup.

All in all, 32 teams took part of the competition.

== First round ==
Team 1	Score	Team 2
31 August
Olympic	0–7	Dünamo
Merkuur	7–2	Nõmme Kalju
Tempori	0–12	Levadia
Narva Trans	9–0	Atli
TVMK	10–0	Toompea
Järva-Jaani	3–1	Haiba
Tallinna Kalev	7–0	Warrior
Eurouniv	3–3 (a.e.t.) (2–4 p)	Lelle
Kose	1–2	Hansa United
1 September
Concordia Audentes	2–4	Kaitseliit
Soccernet	0–4	Merkuur-Juunior
Flora JK	1–7	Tallinna Kuradid
Piraaja	1–5	Kuressaare
6 September
Elva	0–1	Tulevik
7 September
Valga	1–1 (a.e.t.) (3–2 p)	Tervis Pärnu
HÜJK	0–8	Flora

== Second round ==
Team 1	Score	Team 2
9 November
TVMK	2–1	Levadia
Merkuur^{1}	3–0	Lelle
Dünamo	5–2	Järva-Jaani
Kaitseliit	4–5 (a.e.t.)	Kuressaare
Flora	2–1	Tulevik
Tallinna Kuradid	0–9	Narva Trans
Valga^{2}	4–0	Merkuur-Juunior
10 November
Hansa United	0–8	Tallinna Kalev

Notes

- ^{1} Merkuur were renamed to Maag during the winter break.
- ^{2} Maag were merged with Warrior.

== Quarter-finals ==
19 April 2006	Maag	7–0	Kuressaare	Tartu
	Starovoitov 20'; Gussev 26', 31'; Kasimir 37'; Mamontov 59', 85'; Alonen 79' (o.g.)			Stadium: Tartu Annelinna kunstmuruväljak Attendance: 85; Referee: Eiko Saar

19 April 2006	Tallinna Kalev	0–5	Flora	Tallinna
			Post 3', 53'; Bärengrub 62'; Ahjupera 87'; Zahovaiko 90'	Stadium: Kalevi Keskstaadioni kunstmuruväljak Attendance: 120; Referee: Margus Kotter

19 April 2006	Warrior	1–2	TVMK	Tallinn
	Akerta 81'		Mašitšev 32'; Kacanovs 45'	Stadium: Sportland Arena; Attendance: 35; Referee: Aivar Israel

19 April 2006	Narva Trans	4–1	Dünamo	Narva
	Kitto 20'; Kazakov 25'; Lipartov 54'; Gruznov 90'		Andrejev 66'	Stadium: Narva Kalevi staadioni kunstmuruväljak Attendance: 60; Referee: Ain Karutoom

== Semi-finals ==
3 May 2006	Maag	0–2	Flora	Tartu
18:45			Lindpere 29'; Ahjupera 69'	Stadium: Tartu Annelinna kunstmuruväljak Attendance: 375; Referee: Margus Kotter

3 May 2006	Narva Trans	2–3	TVMK	Narva
18:45	Kitto 18' (pen.); Dubõkin 25'		Rimas 5'; Borissov 29'; Gussev 56'	Stadium: Narva Kalevi staadioni kunstmuruväljak Attendance: 400; Referee: Kristo Tohver

== Final ==
17 May 2006	TVMK	1–0	Flora	Tallinn
	Gabovs 86'			Stadium: Kadrioru staadion Attendance: 350; Referee: Eiko Saar
