= Marko Kristal =

Estonian footballer and manager

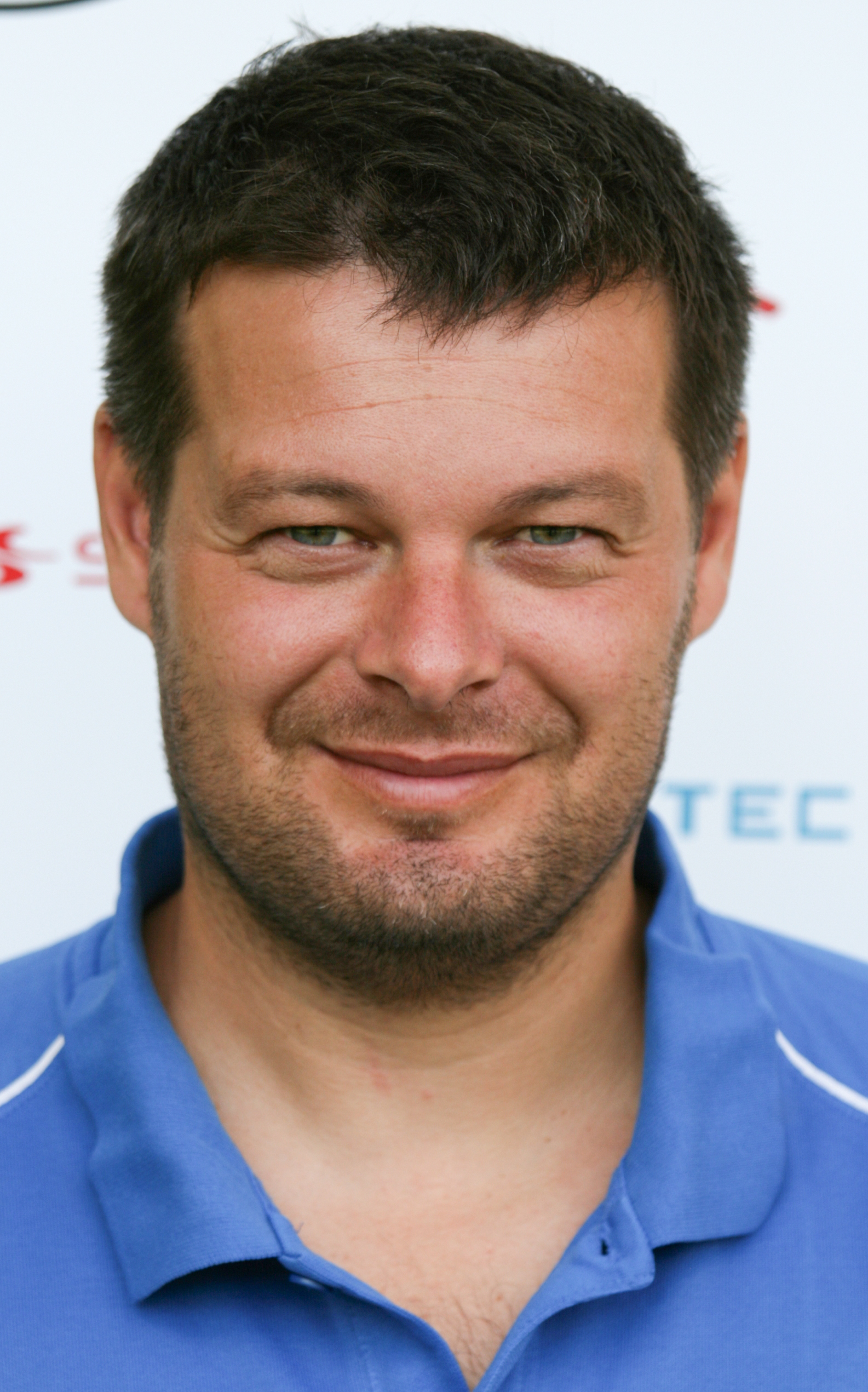
- Kristal in 2011

Personal information
- Date of birth: 2 June 1973 (age 53)
- Place of birth: Tallinn, then part of Estonian SSR, Soviet Union
- Height: 1.78 m (5 ft 10 in)
- Position: Midfielder

Team information
- Current team: Nõmme Kalju (manager)

Youth career
- Lõvid

Senior career*
Years	Team	Apps	(Gls)
1988–1989	Lõvid/Flora	?	(?)
1989	Sport Tallinn	9	(0)
2004	Tervis Pärnu	1	(0)
1989–2004	Flora	313	(65)
1999	→ IF Elfsborg (loan)	4	(0)
2000	→ FC Lahti (loan)	12	(1)
2008–2011	Toompea 1994	26	(9)
2005–2009	Toompea	82	(45)
Total		512	(120)

International career
1992–2005	Estonia	143	(9)

Managerial career
- 2005–2007: Estonia (assistant)
- 2008–2009: Levadia (assistant)
- 2010–2011: Tammeka
- 2012–2015: Levadia
- 2016–2017: JK Sillamäe Kalev (assistant)
- 2017-2018: Tulevik
- 2018–2019: Tabasalu
- 2019–2020: Nõmme Kalju
- 2020–: Nõmme Kalju (assistant)
- * Club domestic league appearances and goals

Marko Kristal (born 2 June 1973) is an Estonian football manager and former player. He is the assistant manager of Nõmme Kalju.

Kristal played as a midfielder for Lõvid, Sport Tallinn, Flora, FC Lahti and the Estonia national team. With Flora, he won seven Meistriliiga titles, two Estonian Cups and two Estonian Supercups. Kristal made his international debut in Estonia's first official match since restoration of independence on 3 June 1992, a 1–1 draw against Slovenia. In 2001, he became the first Estonian player to make 100 appearances for the national team. He made a total of 143 appearances for Estonia, scoring nine goals.

After retiring as a player, Kristal became a manager. He has coached Tammeka, Levadia and Tulevik. Kristal won two Meistriliiga titles, two Estonian Cups and two Estonian Supercups with Levadia.

== Club career ==
=== Early career ===
Kristal began playing football for a local club Tallinna Lõvid (Lions of Tallinn), where he was coached by Roman Ubakivi. In 1989, he played for Soviet Second League club Sport Tallinn.

=== Flora ===
In 1990, Kristal joined Flora, a new club founded as a successor to the Lõvid team. With Flora, he won seven Meistriliiga titles, in 1993–94, 1994–95, 1997–98, 1998, 2001, 2002 and 2003, two Estonian Cups, in 1994–95 and 1997–98, and two Estonian Supercups, in 1998 and 2003. Kristal retired from professional football after the 2004 season. He made a total of 263 Meistriliiga appearances for Flora, scoring 51 goals.

==== IF Elfsborg (loan) ====
On 12 April 1999, Kristal joined Allsvenskan club IF Elfsborg on a two-month loan.

==== FC Lahti (loan) ====
In December 1999, Kristal moved to Veikkausliiga club FC Lahti on a season-long loan.

== International career ==
Kristal made his international debut for Estonia on 3 June 1992, replacing Urmas Kirs in the 77th minute of a historic 1–1 draw against Slovenia in a friendly at Kadriorg Stadium. The match was Estonia's first official match since restoration of independence and Slovenia's first match ever. He scored his first international goal on 24 February 1996, in a 2–2 draw against Faroe Islands in a friendly. From 1995 to 1998, Kristal played in 42 consecutive national team matches. On 28 March 2001, he became the first player to make 100 appearances for Estonia and the youngest player to make his 100th appearance for a European national team after starting in 2002 FIFA World Cup qualifier against Cyprus, and scored in the 2–2 away draw. Kristal finished his international career with a testimonial match on 20 April 2005, a 1–2 home loss to Norway. He made a total of 143 appearances for Estonia, scoring nine goals.

== Career statistics ==
Scores and results list Estonia's goal tally first, score column indicates score after each Kristal goal.

List of international goals scored by Marko Kristal
No.	Date	Venue	Cap	Opponent	Score	Result	Competition
1	24 February 1996	Pyla Municipal Stadium, Pyla, Cyprus	39	Faroe Islands	1–0	2–2	Friendly
2	13 November 1996	Estadi Comunal, Andorra la Vella, Andorra	47	Andorra	6–1	6–1	Friendly
3	1 March 1997	Antonis Papadopoulos Stadium, Larnaca, Cyprus	51	Azerbaijan	1–0	2–0	Friendly
4	8 June 1997	Kadriorg Stadium, Tallinn, Estonia	56	Sweden	2–3	2–3	1998 FIFA World Cup qualification
5	10 July 1997	Žalgiris Stadium, Vilnius, Lithuania	59	Latvia	1–0	1–2	1997 Baltic Cup
6	27 November 1997	Rizal Memorial Stadium, Manila, Philippines	64	Philippines	1–0	1–0	Friendly
7	18 August 1999	Pärnu Kalev Stadium, Pärnu, Estonia	86	Armenia	1–0	2–0	Friendly
8	19 March 2001	Cairo International Stadium, Cairo, Egypt	99	Egypt	2–1	3–3	Friendly
9	28 March 2001	Tsirio Stadium, Limassol, Cyprus	100	Cyprus	1–2	2–2	2002 FIFA World Cup qualification

== Honours ==
=== Player ===
Flora

- Meistriliiga: 1993–94, 1994–95, 1997–98, 1998, 2001, 2002, 2003
- Estonian Cup: 1994–95, 1997–98
- Estonian Supercup: 1998, 2003

=== Manager ===
Levadia

- Meistriliiga: 2013, 2014
- Estonian Cup: 2011–12, 2013–14
- Estonian Supercup: 2013, 2015

=== Individual ===
- Meistriliiga Manager of the Month: October 2012, March 2013, August 2013, October 2013,June 2014, June 2015, August 2015

Orders

- Order of the Estonian Red Cross, 5th Class

== See also ==
- List of men's footballers with 100 or more international caps
