= Martin Reim =

Estonian footballer and manager

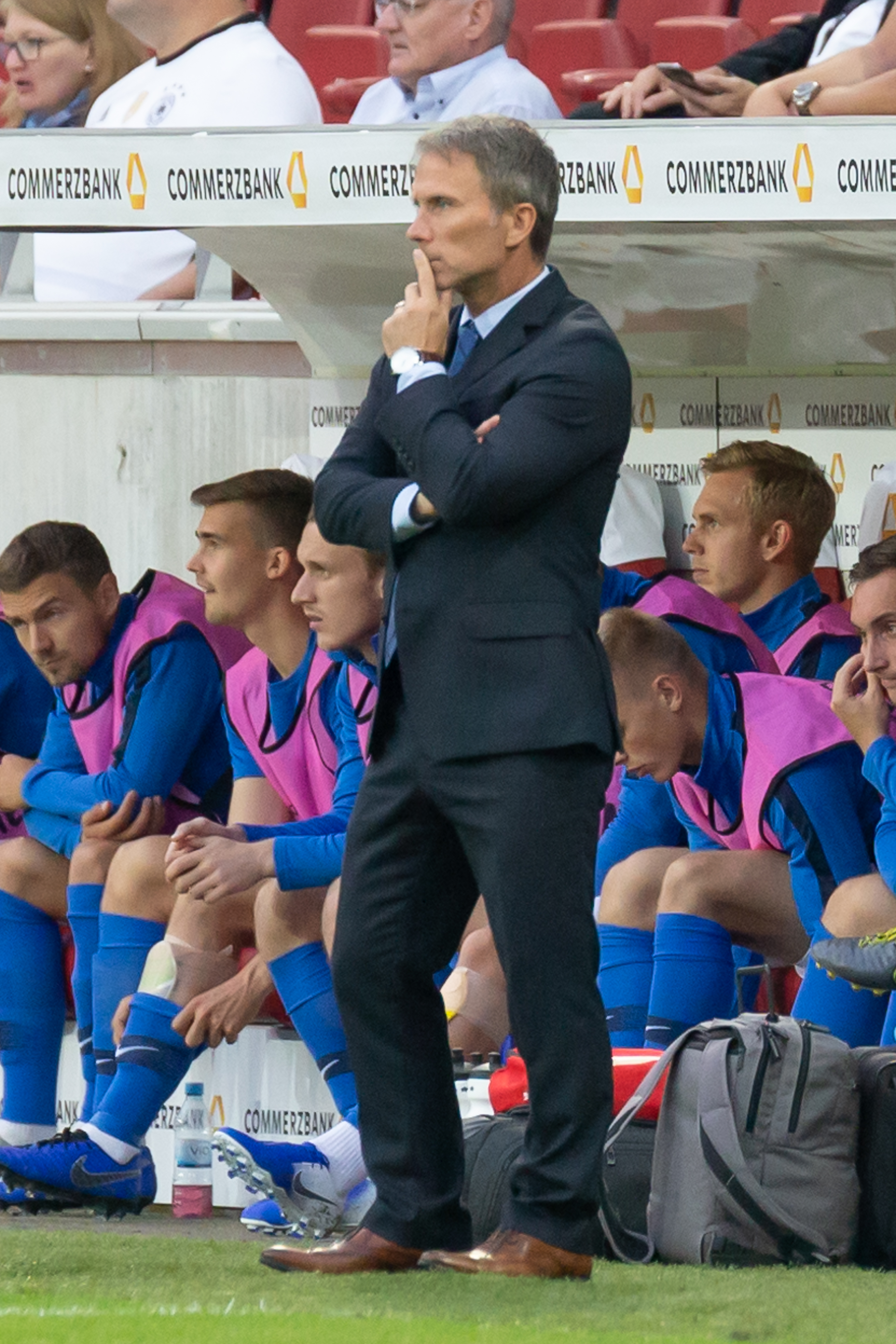
- Reim in 2019

Personal information
- Date of birth: 14 May 1971 (age 55)
- Place of birth: Tartu, then part of Estonian SSR, Soviet Union
- Height: 1.68 m (5 ft 6 in)
- Position: Midfielder

Youth career
- 1977–1987: Lõvid

Senior career*
Years	Team	Apps	(Gls)
1987	VAZ/Žiguli Tallinn	10	(1)
1988	Lõvid	21	(10)
1989	Sport Tallinn	35	(3)
1990–1991	Norma	38	(29)
1996	Lelle	1	(0)
1992–1999	Flora	167	(49)
1999	→ KTP (loan)	20	(2)
2000	KTP	29	(1)
2003	Tervis Pärnu	2	(0)
2001–2008	Flora	218	(22)
Total		541	(117)

International career
1992–2009	Estonia	157	(14)

Managerial career
- 2010–2012: Flora
- 2012–2013: Estonia U18
- 2012–2016: Estonia U21
- 2012–2016: Estonia U23
- 2016–2019: Estonia
- 2019–2020: Levadia
- * Club domestic league appearances and goals

Martin Reim (born 14 May 1971) is an Estonian football manager and former professional player.

Reim played most of his professional career in Estonia as a central midfielder, including two separate stints for Flora with which he won seven Meistriliiga titles. He is also the most capped Estonia national football team player of all time with 157 appearances, and was the most capped European international player from August 2007 until December 2009, when he was surpassed by Latvia's Vitālijs Astafjevs. Reim is also the most capped player never to have played in a major tournament.

Reim was named Estonian Footballer of the Year in 1995 and won the Estonian Silverball award three times, in 1995, 1997, and 1999. In 2011, he received the Order of the White Star for his services to Estonia.

In 2007, Reim opened a football academy (Martin Reimi Jalgpallikool). In 2016, the academy team Viimsi MRJK merged with Esiliiga B club HÜJK Emmaste, and became Viimsi JK.

== Early life ==
Reim was born in Tartu and grew up in Tallinn. He graduated from the Tallinn Secondary School No. 49 in 1989, and from the Tallinn University of Technology in 2000.

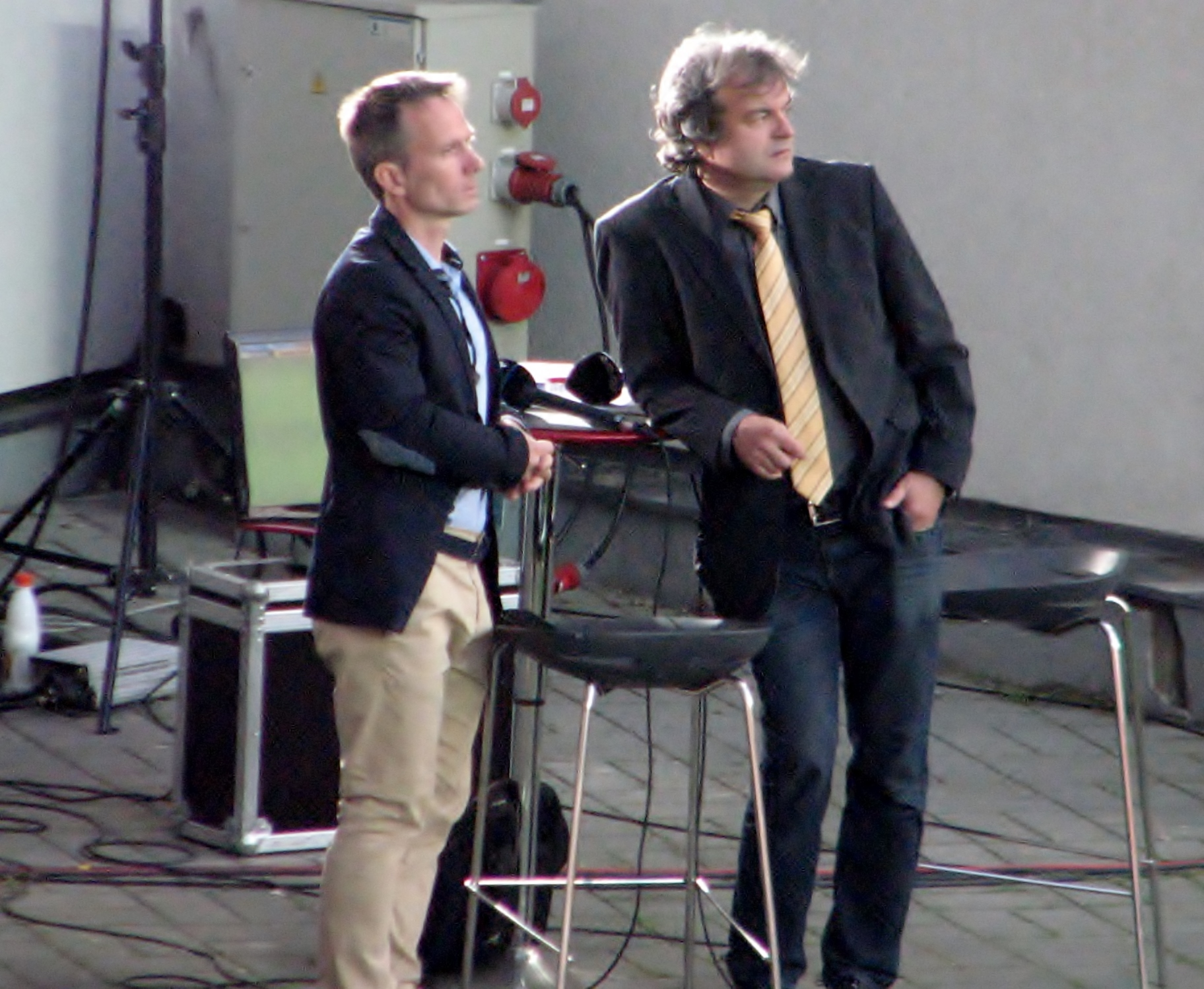
Reim (left) with Marko Kaljuveer in 2014

== Club career ==
=== Early career ===
Reim played for a local club Tallinna Lõvid (Lions of Tallinn), where he was coached by his father Olev Reim and Roman Ubakivi. In 1989, he joined Soviet Second League club Sport Tallinn. Reim returned to the Estonian league after a season and joined Norma. He was the top goalscorer in the 1990 season with 18 goals.

=== Flora ===
In 1992, Reim joined Meistriliiga club Flora, the successor of the Lõvid team. He won seven trophies with the club, including four Meistriliiga titles, in 1993–94, 1994–95, 1997–98 and 1998, two Estonian Cups, in 1994–95 and 1997–98, and an Estonian Supercup in 1998.

=== KTP ===
In June 1999, Reim joined Veikkausliiga club KTP on loan until the end of the season. The move was made permanent in December 1999, for a reported fee of 150,000 FIM (400,000 EEK).

=== Return to Flora ===
In 2001, Reim returned to Flora. During his second spell at Flora, he won three consecutive Meistriliiga titles, in 2001, 2002 and 2003, another Estonian Cup in 2008, and three more Estonian Supercups, in 2002, 2003 and 2004. On 5 December 2008, Reim announced his retirement from professional football. He holds the club record for the most appearances in the Meistriliiga, with 385.

== International career ==
Reim made his international debut for Estonia on 3 June 1992, in a historic 1–1 draw against Slovenia in a friendly at Kadriorg Stadium. The match was Estonia's first official match since restoration of independence and Slovenia's first match ever. Reim scored his first international goal on 23 May 1994, in a 1–2 home loss to Wales in a friendly. He won the Estonian Silverball award for the best national team goal of the year three times, in 1995, 1997, 1999. On 2 June 2001, Reim made his 100th appearance for Estonia in a 2–4 home loss to the Netherlands in a qualification match for the 2002 FIFA World Cup. He ended his international career with a testimonial match on 6 June 2009, a 3–0 home win over Equatorial Guinea. With 157 appearances and 14 goals scored, he is Estonia's most capped player of all time.

== Managerial career ==
=== Flora ===
On 3 December 2009, Flora announced that Reim would replace Tarmo Rüütli as the new manager of the club. He led Flora to victory in the 2010 season, ending the reign of Levadia who had won the four previous Meistriliiga titles. Flora successfully defended their title in 2011 season and won the 2010–11 Estonian Cup, defeating Narva Trans 2–0 in the final. On 14 October 2012, Reim resigned after poor results in the Meistriliiga, with Marko Lelov and Norbert Hurt taking over.

=== Estonia youth teams ===
In October 2012, Reim was named as manager of the Estonia under-18, under-21 and under-23 national sides. He led the under-21 team to win the 2014 Baltic Cup.

=== Estonia ===
On 14 September 2016, the Estonian Football Association appointed Reim as manager of the Estonia national team until the end of the qualification tournament for the 2018 FIFA World Cup. On 17 June 2019, he and his coaching staff resigned from Estonia national team, six days after the 0–8 defeat to Germany in the UEFA Euro 2020 qualification.

== Career statistics ==
=== International goals ===
Scores and results list Estonia's goal tally first, score column indicates score after each Reim goal.

List of international goals scored by Martin Reim
No.	Date	Venue	Cap	Opponent	Score	Result	Competition
1	23 May 1994	Kadriorg Stadium, Tallinn, Estonia	18	Wales	1–2	1–2	Friendly
2	15 February 1995	Tsirion Stadium, Limassol, Cyprus	27	Cyprus	1–1	1–3	Friendly
3	25 March 1995	Stadio Arechi, Salerno, Italy	28	Italy	1–3	1–4	UEFA Euro 1996 qualifying
4	11 June 1995	Kadriorg Stadium, Tallinn, Estonia	31	Slovenia	1–0	1–3	UEFA Euro 1996 qualifying
5	3 September 1995	Maksimir Stadium, Zagreb, Croatia	33	Croatia	1–1	1–7	UEFA Euro 1996 qualifying
6	9 July 1996	Kreenholm Stadium, Narva, Estonia	38	Lithuania	1–1	1–1	1996 Baltic Cup
7	9 July 1997	Žalgiris Stadium, Vilnius, Lithuania	53	Lithuania	1–2	1–2	1997 Baltic Cup
8	4 June 1998	Kadriorg Stadium, Tallinn, Estonia	62	Faroe Islands	2–0	5–0	UEFA Euro 2000 qualifying
9	22 January 1999	Umm al-Fahm Municipal Stadium, Umm al-Fahm, Israel	72	Norway	1–3	3–3	Friendly
10	4 September 1999	Tórsvøllur, Tórshavn, Faroe Islands	80	Faroe Islands	1–0	2–0	UEFA Euro 2000 qualifying
11	1 November 1999	Mohammad Bin Zayed Stadium, Abu Dhabi, United Arab Emirates	84	United Arab Emirates	1–0	2–2	Friendly
12	25 February 2000	Rajamangala National Stadium, Bangkok, Thailand	88	Thailand	1–2	1–2	2000 King's Cup
13	16 August 2000	Kadriorg Stadium, Tallinn, Estonia	90	Andorra	1–0	1–0	2002 FIFA World Cup qualification
14	7 October 2000	Estadi Comunal, Andorra la Vella, Andorra	92	Andorra	1–0	2–1	2002 FIFA World Cup qualification

== Managerial statistics ==
As of 11 June 2019

Team	From	To	Record				
Team	From	To	G	W	D	L	Win %
Estonia	2016	2019	34	12	7	15	35.29
Total			34	12	7	15	35.29

== Honours ==
Individual

- Meistriliiga Manager of the Month: May 2012, May 2020

== See also ==
- List of men's footballers with 100 or more international caps
