= List of Estonian football transfers winter 2024–25 =

This is a list of Estonian football transfers for the 2024–25 winter transfer window. Only transfers featuring Meistriliiga are listed.

== Meistriliiga ==
Note: Flags indicate national team as has been defined under FIFA eligibility rules. Players may hold more than one non-FIFA nationality.

=== Levadia ===
In:

No.	Pos.	Nation	Player
3	DF	(Nigeria) NGA	Victory Iboro (from (Nigeria) Beyond Limits)
4	DF	(Estonia) EST	Tanel Tammik (from Tammeka)
9	FW	(The Gambia) GAM	Bubacarr Tambedou (from (Georgia (country)) Dinamo Batumi)
14	MF	(Ghana) GHA	Ernest Agyiri (on loan from (Denmark) Randers, previously on loan at (Denmark) Kolding)
33	MF	(Ghana) GHA	Enock Otoo (from (Denmark) Lyngby)
59	FW	(Estonia) EST	Gregor Lehtmets (from Viimsi)

Out:

No.	Pos.	Nation	Player
10	MF	(Estonia) EST	Ioan Yakovlev (to (Greece) Panionios)
26	DF	(Mali) MLI	Bourama Fomba (to (Cyprus) Omonia Aradippou)
59	DF	(Estonia) EST	Jevgeni Tšernjakov (on loan to Tallinna Kalev)
—	MF	(Azerbaijan) AZE	Murad Valiyev (to (Azerbaijan) Shamakhi, previously on loan at Nõmme United)

=== Nõmme Kalju ===
In:

No.	Pos.	Nation	Player
2	DF	(Estonia) EST	Johannes Lillemets (from Flora U21)
5	DF	(Estonia) EST	Uku Kõrre (from Vaprus)
14	MF	(Ukraine) UKR	Oleksandr Musolitin (from Nõmme United)
17	FW	(Togo) TOG	Kevin D'Almeida (from (Austria) Kitzbühel)
20	MF	(Senegal) SEN	Modou Tambedou (from (Belgium) Zulte Waregem)
24	FW	(Estonia) EST	Kristjan Kask (from Vaprus)
30	FW	(Ghana) GHA	Ibrahim Jabir (from (Ghana) AsanSka)
46	DF	(Estonia) EST	Sander Alex Liit (from Kuressaare)
51	FW	(Portugal) POR	Tiago Baptista (from (Portugal) Braga U19)
73	DF	(Estonia) EST	Fjodor Jekimov (from Tallinn)
90	FW	(The Gambia) GAM	Mustapha Deen (free agent)

Out:

No.	Pos.	Nation	Player
8	MF	(Japan) JPN	Koki Hayashi (free agent)
9	FW	(Brazil) BRA	Lucas Serravalle (loan return to (Brazil) GE Juventus)
14	MF	(Estonia) EST	Nikita Komissarov (to (Lithuania) Šiauliai)
17	MF	(Estonia) EST	Kaspar Paur (free agent)
24	FW	(Estonia) EST	Alex Tamm (to (Slovenia) Olimpija Ljubljana)
47	DF	(France) FRA	Marlone Foubert (to (Spain) Xerez Deportivo)
70	MF	(France) FRA	Réginald Mbu Alidor (free agent)

=== Paide ===
In:

No.	Pos.	Nation	Player
1	GK	(Estonia) EST	Marko Meerits (from Nõmme United)
6	MF	(Nigeria) NGA	Luqman Gilmore (from (Armenia) Urartu)
7	FW	(The Gambia) GAM	Pa Assan Corr (from (The Gambia) Real de Banjul)
9	FW	(Estonia) EST	Sten Reinkort (free agent)
10	MF	(Estonia) EST	Martin Miller (from (Republic of Ireland) Bohemians)
20	FW	(The Gambia) GAM	Abdoulie Ceesay (from (The Gambia) Real de Banjul, previously on loan)
21	DF	(Bosnia and Herzegovina) BIH	Dražen Dubačkić (from (Bosnia and Herzegovina) Sloboda Tuzla)
30	FW	(The Gambia) GAM	Abdourahman Badamosi (from (The Gambia) Real de Banjul)

Out:

No.	Pos.	Nation	Player
1	GK	(Estonia) EST	Mihkel Aksalu (retired)
4	DF	(Estonia) EST	Robin Kane (on loan to Viimsi)
6	MF	(Estonia) EST	Patrik Kristal (to (Germany) Köln II)
7	MF	(Estonia) EST	Herol Riiberg (to Raasiku Joker)
9	FW	(Estonia) EST	Kristofer Piht (to Harju)
10	MF	(Estonia) EST	Andre Frolov (to Nõmme United)
16	MF	(Serbia) SRB	Predrag Medić (free agent)
17	MF	(Estonia) EST	Dimitri Jepihhin (to (Slovakia) Trenčín)
20	FW	(The Gambia) GAM	Abdoulie Ceesay (to (Germany) FC St. Pauli)
56	GK	(Estonia) EST	Mattias Sapp (on loan to Viimsi)
80	FW	(Ghana) GHA	Thomas Agyepong (free agent)
—	FW	(Estonia) EST	Sten Jakob Viidas (on loan to Narva Trans, previously on loan at (Finland) KPV)
—	DF	(Estonia) EST	Siim Aer (to Vaprus, previously on loan at Kuressaare)
—	MF	(Estonia) EST	Silver Alex Kelder (to (Australia) Balga, previously on loan at Vaprus)

=== Flora ===
In:

No.	Pos.	Nation	Player
2	MF	(Estonia) EST	Nikita Kalmõkov (from Nõmme United)
24	DF	(Estonia) EST	Oscar Pihela (from Kuressaare, previously on loan)
30	MF	(Estonia) EST	Tristan Teeväli (from Tallinna Kalev)
89	MF	(Estonia) EST	Maksim Kalimullin (from Tallinn, previously on loan)
—	DF	(Estonia) EST	Oscar Joost (from Tulevik)

Out:

No.	Pos.	Nation	Player
1	GK	(Estonia) EST	Silver Rebane (to Nõmme United)
5	MF	(Estonia) EST	Vladislav Kreida (to (Czech Republic) Sigma Olomouc)
7	FW	(Estonia) EST	Tony Varjund (on loan to (Netherlands) Jong Utrecht)
14	MF	(Estonia) EST	Konstantin Vassiljev (retired)
17	FW	(Estonia) EST	Mait Eenmaa (free agent)
28	MF	(Estonia) EST	Markus Soomets (to (Netherlands) Den Bosch)
—	DF	(Estonia) EST	Oscar Joost (on loan to Kuressaare)
—	DF	(Estonia) EST	Markkus Seppik (to Vaprus, previously on loan)
—	DF	(Estonia) EST	Mathias Palts (to Nõmme United, previously on loan at Kuressaare)
—	FW	(Estonia) EST	Mattias Männilaan (to (Gibraltar) Lincoln Red Imps, previously on loan at Kuressaare)

=== Tammeka ===
In:

No.	Pos.	Nation	Player
5	DF	(Estonia) EST	Marius Vister (from Tulevik, previously on loan)
93	DF	(Estonia) EST	Kevin Anderson (from Welco)

Out:

No.	Pos.	Nation	Player
4	DF	(Estonia) EST	Tanel Tammik (to Levadia)
17	FW	(Estonia) EST	Egert Naruson (free agent)
50	FW	(Estonia) EST	Priit Peedo (to Tartu Kalev U21)
—	DF	(Estonia) EST	Ats Toomsalu (to Tartu Kalev, previously on loan)
—	MF	(Estonia) EST	Dominic Laaneots (to Elva, previously on loan)

=== Narva Trans ===
In:

No.	Pos.	Nation	Player
5	DF	(Canada) CAN	Cristian Campagna (from (Finland) Jazz)
7	MF	(Portugal) POR	Afonso Correia (from (Portugal) Pombal)
8	MF	(Estonia) EST	Stanislav Agaptšev (from Nõmme Kalju U21)
9	FW	(Togo) TOG	Josué Doke (from (Lithuania) Be1)
11	FW	(Ukraine) UKR	Mykhaylo Kozhushko (from (Germany) Lok Stendal)
14	DF	(Estonia) EST	Aleksander Filatov (from Levadia U21)
32	DF	(Ukraine) UKR	Dmytro Bondar (from (Lithuania) Neptūnas)
80	FW	(Estonia) EST	Sten Jakob Viidas (on loan from Paide, previously on loan at (Finland) KPV)

Out:

No.	Pos.	Nation	Player
5	DF	(Canada) CAN	Kelsey Egwu (on loan to (Canada) Valour)
8	MF	(Argentina) ARG	Leonardo Rolón (free agent)
9	FW	(Georgia (country)) GEO	Sergo Kukhianidze (to (Malta) Marsaxlokk)
11	FW	(Estonia) EST	Taaniel Usta (loan return to Harju)
16	DF	(Estonia) EST	Sergei Kondrattsev (free agent)
49	MF	(Georgia (country)) GEO	Zakaria Beglarishvili (to Nõmme United)
66	MF	(Estonia) EST	German Šlein (to (Serbia) Smederevo)
71	MF	(Poland) POL	Kacper Kopczak (free agent)

=== Vaprus ===
In:

No.	Pos.	Nation	Player
43	DF	(Estonia) EST	Markkus Seppik (from Flora, previously on loan)
—	DF	(Estonia) EST	Siim Aer (from Paide, previously on loan at Kuressaare)

Out:

No.	Pos.	Nation	Player
5	DF	(Estonia) EST	Uku Kõrre (to Nõmme Kalju)
8	MF	(Estonia) EST	Silver Alex Kelder (loan return to Paide)
9	FW	(Estonia) EST	Kristjan Kask (to Nõmme Kalju)

=== Kuressaare ===
In:

No.	Pos.	Nation	Player
33	DF	(Estonia) EST	Oscar Joost (on loan from Flora)

Out:

No.	Pos.	Nation	Player
2	DF	(Estonia) EST	Mathias Palts (loan return to Flora)
4	DF	(Estonia) EST	Sander Alex Liit (from Nõmme Kalju)
27	FW	(Estonia) EST	Mattias Männilaan (loan return to Flora)
30	DF	(Estonia) EST	Siim Aer (loan return to Paide)
—	DF	(Estonia) EST	Oscar Pihela (to Flora, previously on loan)

=== Tallinna Kalev ===
In:

No.	Pos.	Nation	Player
3	DF	(Estonia) EST	Jevgeni Tšernjakov (on loan from Levadia)

Out:

No.	Pos.	Nation	Player
11	MF	(Estonia) EST	Tristan Teeväli (to Flora)

=== Harju ===
In:

No.	Pos.	Nation	Player
87	FW	(Estonia) EST	Kristofer Piht (from Paide)

Out:

No.	Pos.	Nation	Player

== See also ==
- 2025 Meistriliiga
