= 1998 Esiliiga =

Estonian football league season for second division

Esiliiga
- Season: 1998

The 1998 Esiliiga is the eighth season of the Esiliiga, second-highest Estonian league for association football clubs, since its establishment in 1992.

== Final table ==
Pos	Team	Pld	W	D	L	GF	GA	GD	Pts	Promotion or relegation
1	Levadia Maardu (P)	14	9	5	0	29	7	+22	32	Promotion to Meistriliiga
2	Vigri Tallinn	14	8	3	3	28	12	+16	27	Qualification for promotion play-offs
3	Lootus	14	6	4	4	21	19	+2	22	
4	Valga	14	5	4	5	14	11	+3	19	
5	Sillamäe	14	5	3	6	15	23	−8	18	
6	Kuressaare	14	4	5	5	20	19	+1	17	Qualification for relegation play-offs
7	Merkuur (R)	14	5	0	9	21	31	−10	15	Relegation to II Liiga
8	Pärnu (R)	14	1	2	11	14	40	−26	5	Relegation to II Liiga

Source: RSSSF
Rules for classification: 1) points; 2) head-to-head points; 3) head-to-head goal difference; 4) head-to-head goals scored; 5) goal difference; 6) number of goals scored.
(P) Promoted; (R) Relegated

== Promotion playoff ==
Vigri Tallinn	0 – 2	Eesti Põlevkivi

Eesti Põlevkivi	0 – 0	Vigri Tallinn

JK Eesti Põlevkivi Jõhvi beat KSK Vigri Tallinn 2–0 on aggregate. Eesti Põlevkivi remained in Meistriliiga, Vigri in Esiliiga.

== Relegation playoff ==
M.C.	1 – 1	Kuressaare

Kuressaare	1 – 0	M.C.

FC Kuressaare beat FC M.C. Tallinn 2–1 on aggregate. Kuressaare remained in Esiliiga, M.C. in Second Division.

== See also ==
- 1998 Meistriliiga
- 1998 in Estonian football
