= 2001 Meistriliiga =

Estonian national championships in football

Meistriliiga
- Season: 2001
- Champions: Flora (5th title)
- Top goalscorer: Maksim Gruznov (37)

The 2001 Meistriliiga was the 11th season of the Meistriliiga, Estonia's premier football league. Flora won their fifth title.

== League table ==
| Pos | Team | Pld | W | D | L | GF | GA | GD | Pts | Qualification or relegation |
|---|---|---|---|---|---|---|---|---|---|---|
| 1 | Flora (C) | 28 | 21 | 5 | 2 | 62 | 18 | +44 | 68 | Qualification for Champions League first qualifying round |
| 2 | TVMK | 28 | 16 | 8 | 4 | 77 | 30 | +47 | 56 | Qualification for UEFA Cup qualifying round |
| 3 | Maardu Levadia (Note: Club changed their name to Levadia Tallinn in 2004) | 28 | 16 | 7 | 5 | 72 | 35 | +37 | 55 | Qualification for Intertoto Cup first round |
| 4 | Narva Trans | 28 | 16 | 3 | 9 | 79 | 35 | +44 | 51 | |
| 5 | Tulevik | 28 | 11 | 6 | 11 | 41 | 37 | +4 | 39 | |
| 6 | Tallinna Levadia (Note: Club changed their name to Levadia II Tallinn in 2004) | 28 | 6 | 5 | 17 | 30 | 78 | −48 | 23 | Qualification for UEFA Cup qualifying round (Note: Qualified As Estonian Cup winners) |
| 7 | Lootus | 28 | 4 | 5 | 19 | 21 | 53 | −32 | 17 | Qualification for relegation play-offs |
| 8 | Kuressaare (R) | 28 | 2 | 1 | 25 | 18 | 114 | −96 | 7 | Relegation to Esiliiga |

Source: Estonian Football Association (in Estonian)
Rules for classification: 1) points; 2) number of wins; 3) head-to-head points; 4) head-to-head goal difference; 5) head-to-head goals scored; 6) goal difference; 7) number of goals scored.
(C) Champions; (R) Relegated

=== Relegation play-off ===
12 November 2001

| Valga | 2–1 | Lootus |
|---|---|---|
| Jääger 14'; Kask 14' | | Golitsõn 64' |

17 November 2001

| Lootus | 1–0 | Valga |
|---|---|---|
| Abornev 78' |

2–2 on aggregate. Lootus won on away goals and retained their Meistriliiga spot for the 2002 season.

== Results ==
Each team played every opponent four times, twice at home and twice on the road, for a total of 36 games.

=== First half of season ===
| Home \ Away | FLO | KUR | LOO | LMA | TRS | LTA | TUL | TVM |
|---|---|---|---|---|---|---|---|---|
| Flora | | 3–1 | 4–0 | 3–2 | 3–2 | 3–1 | 2–1 | 1–1 |
| Kuressaare | 0–3 | | 3–1 | 1–3 | 1–5 | 1–2 | 0–1 | 1–6 |
| Lootus | 1–1 | 1–0 | | 1–1 | 0–1 | 2–0 | 0–0 | 0–2 |
| Maardu Levadia | 1–2 | 2–1 | 3–3 | | 3–0 | 6–2 | 4–1 | 3–0 |
| Narva Trans | 3–1 | 5–0 | 5–0 | 3–4 | | 4–0 | 4–0 | 1–3 |
| Tallinna Levadia | 1–2 | 2–1 | 1–0 | 1–4 | 0–0 | | 0–5 | 0–1 |
| Tulevik | 0–2 | 1–2 | 3–0 | 0–0 | 3–2 | 1–1 | | 1–4 |
| TVMK | 1–1 | 5–1 | 2–1 | 1–1 | 1–3 | 7–2 | 1–1 | |

Legend: Blue = home team win; Yellow = draw; Red = away team win.

=== Second half of season ===
| Home \ Away | FLO | KUR | LOO | LMA | TRS | LTA | TUL | TVM |
|---|---|---|---|---|---|---|---|---|
| Flora | | 4–0 | 1–0 | 2–0 | 2–1 | 4–0 | 2–0 | 0–0 |
| Kuressaare | 0–5 | | 0–5 | 0–7 | 0–12 | 2–4 | 1–2 | 1–7 |
| Lootus | 0–3 | 5–0 | | 0–1 | 0–1 | 1–1 | 0–1 | 0–2 |
| Maardu Levadia | 0–1 | 4–1 | 5–0 | | 3–3 | 6–2 | 2–0 | 1–1 |
| Narva Trans | 0–0 | 3–0 | 1–0 | 1–2 | | 5–2 | 2–0 | 6–3 |
| Tallinna Levadia | 0–5 | 0–0 | 3–0 | 2–0 | 0–5 | | 1–1 | 1–4 |
| Tulevik | 1–2 | 4–0 | 4–0 | 1–2 | 3–1 | 4–1 | | 1–0 |
| TVMK | 1–0 | 12–0 | 4–0 | 2–2 | 1–0 | 4–0 | 1–1 | |

Legend: Blue = home team win; Yellow = draw; Red = away team win.

== Top scorers ==
| Rank | Player | Club | Goals |
|---|---|---|---|
| 1 | (Estonia) Maksim Gruznov | Narva Trans | 37 |
| 2 | (Estonia) Andrei Krõlov | TVMK | 23 |
| 3 | (Estonia) Toomas Krõm | Levadia | 20 |
| 4 | (Estonia) Dmitri Ustritski | Tulevik | 16 |
| 5 | (Estonia) Aleksandr Kulik | Flora | 14 |
| 5 | (Estonia) Vladimir Tšelnokov | Levadia | 14 |
| 7 | (Estonia) Anatoli Novožilov | TVMK | 13 |
| 7 | (Estonia) Indrek Zelinski | Flora | 13 |
| 9 | (Estonia) Oleg Gorjatšov | Narva Trans | 12 |
| 10 | (Russia) Dmitri Lipartov | Narva Trans | 9 |
| 10 | (Estonia) Aleksandr Tarassenkov | Flora | 9 |
