= 1999 Esiliiga =

Estonian football league season for second division

Esiliiga
- Season: 1999

The 1999 Esiliiga is the ninth season of the Esiliiga, second-highest Estonian league for association football clubs, since its establishment in 1992.

== Final table ==
Pos	Team	Pld	W	D	L	GF	GA	GD	Pts	Promotion or relegation
1	Kuressaare (P)	28	21	4	3	92	25	+67	67	Promotion to Meistriliiga
2	Lootus (P)	28	21	2	5	81	33	+48	65	Qualification for promotion play-offs
3	Vigri	28	18	6	4	70	28	+42	60	
4	Valga	28	11	2	15	34	59	−25	35	
5	M.C.	28	9	4	15	39	73	−34	31	
6	FC Maardu	28	8	6	14	47	59	−12	30	Qualification for relegation play-offs
7	FC Lelle (R)	28	5	2	21	26	75	−49	17	Relegation to II Liiga
8	Sillamäe (R)	28	5	2	21	26	62	−36	17	Relegation to II Liiga

Source: rsssf.com
Rules for classification: 1) points; 2) head-to-head points; 3) head-to-head goal difference; 4) head-to-head goals scored; 5) goal difference; 6) number of goals scored.
(P) Promoted; (R) Relegated

== Promotion playoff ==
Lelle SK beat FC Lootus Kohtla-Järve. Lelle SK remained in Meistriliiga, Lootus in Esiliiga.

== See also ==
- 1999 Meistriliiga
