= Vladislav Gussev =

Estonian footballer

Personal information
- Full name: Vladislav Gussev
- Date of birth: 26 August 1986 (age 40)
- Place of birth: Tartu, then part of Estonian SSR, Soviet Union
- Height: 1.97 m (6 ft 6 in)
- Position: Striker

Youth career
- JK Merkuur Tartu

Senior career*
Years	Team	Apps	(Gls)
2003	Pärnu Tervis	37	(14)
2004	Valga	7	(0)
2004–2005	Merkuur	29	(9)
2005–2008	TVMK	92	(49)
2013–2017	Merkuur	91	(68)
2018–2021	Helios	52	(18)

International career
2006–2007	Estonia	2	(0)
- * Club domestic league appearances and goals as of 31 December 2022

Vladislav Gussev (born 26 August 1986) is an Estonian former footballer. Striker and is 1.97 m tall and weighs 86 kg. He has played two games for the Estonia national football team.

In November 2008, he was handed a two-year ban by the Estonian Football Association for attempts of match fixing.

== Personal ==
He has got an older brother, Vitali Gussev, who is also a footballer.
