= Glen Atle Larsen =

Norwegian footballer (born 1982)

Personal information
- Date of birth: 24 August 1982 (age 44)
- Place of birth: Stord Municipality, Norway
- Height: 1.79 m (5 ft 10 1/2 in)
- Positions: Midfielder; striker

Youth career
- Finnås SK

Senior career*
Years	Team	Apps	(Gls)
–2000	Bremnes		
2001	Haugesund	3	(0)
2002	FC Flora	12	(6)
2002–2003	FC Valga	?	(13)
2004	Vålerenga	0	(0)
2004	→ Nybergsund (loan)		
2004–2005	Dundee	16	(1)
2005–2007	St Patrick's Athletic	15	(0)
2008–2009	Kongsvinger	5	(1)
2010	Kolding		
2010–present	Skeid		
- * Club domestic league appearances and goals

Glen Atle Larsen (born 24 August 1982) is a Norwegian footballer who plays for Skeid. He is primarily a midfielder but can also play as a forward.

Larsen was born in Stord Municipality in Sunnhordland. He started his career in the clubs Finnås and Bremnes in Bømlo Municipality. After playing for Haugesund, he started a career in Estonia with Flora Tallinn and Valga. He joined Vålerenga in Norway, soon went on loan to Nybergsund before going on to Dundee and St Patrick's Athletic In Scotland and Ireland. At Dundee, his only goal for the club came in a dramatic 4-4 draw with Hibernian. He played 5 games for Kongsvinger in 2008, and left the club in 2009.

In 2010, he played for Kolding before joining Skeid in the summer.
