= 2002 Meistriliiga =

Estonian national championships in football

Meistriliiga
- Season: 2002
- Champions: Flora (6th title)
- Top goalscorer: Andrei Krõlov (37)

The 2002 Meistriliiga was the 12th season of the Meistriliiga, Estonia's premier football league. Flora won their sixth title.

== League table ==
Pos	Team	Pld	W	D	L	GF	GA	GD	Pts	Qualification or relegation
1	Flora (C)	28	20	4	4	79	25	+54	64	Qualification for Champions League first qualifying round
2	Maardu Levadia (Note: Club changed their name to Levadia Tallinn in 2004)	28	18	8	2	70	25	+45	62	Qualification for UEFA Cup qualifying round (Note: TVMK Qualified As Estonian Cup winners)
3	TVMK	28	16	5	7	90	35	+55	53	Qualification for UEFA Cup qualifying round
4	Narva Trans	28	14	5	9	54	49	+5	47	Qualification for Intertoto Cup first round
5	Tulevik	28	10	6	12	51	52	−1	36	
6	Tallinna Levadia (Note: Club changed their name to Levadia II Tallinn in 2004)	28	6	5	17	32	70	−38	23	
7	Lootus (R)	28	5	6	17	24	67	−43	21	Qualification for relegation play-offs
8	Levadia Pärnu (R)	28	1	5	22	19	96	−77	8	Relegation to Esiliiga

Source: RSSSF – Estonia 2002
Rules for classification: 1) points; 2) number of wins; 3) head-to-head points; 4) head-to-head goal difference; 5) head-to-head goals scored; 6) goal difference; 7) number of goals scored.
(C) Champions; (R) Relegated

=== Relegation play-off ===
16 November 2002

Kuressaare	1–1	Lootus
A. Dubõkin 2'		Popov 41'

24 November 2002

Lootus	0–1	Kuressaare
		Õun 85'

Kuressaare won 2–1 on aggregate and were promoted for the 2003 Meistriliiga. Lootus were relegated to the 2003 Esiliiga.

== Results ==
Each team played every opponent four times, twice at home and twice on the road, for a total of 36 games.

=== First half of season ===
Home \ Away	FLO	LPÄ	LOO	LMA	TRS	LTA	TUL	TVM
Flora		3–1	4–0	1–0	1–6	2–1	2–0	0–0
Levadia Pärnu	0–4		2–1	0–1	1–3	1–1	1–6	1–7
Lootus	0–3	2–1		1–2	4–2	0–0	3–1	0–3
Maardu Levadia	1–1	5–0	6–2		1–1	6–2	3–0	2–1
Narva Trans	3–2	2–0	4–1	1–1		3–1	2–0	0–3
Tallinna Levadia	1–2	2–2	1–0	0–3	2–3		1–3	0–4
Tulevik	2–3	0–0	1–1	0–0	1–1	2–3		3–1
TVMK	1–2	2–0	6–0	6–0	7–0	2–0	4–1	

Legend: Blue = home team win; Yellow = draw; Red = away team win.

=== Second half of season ===
Home \ Away	FLO	LPÄ	LOO	LMA	TRS	LTA	TUL	TVM
Flora		7–0	3–0	1–3	1–0	10–0	5–1	0–0
Levadia Pärnu	0–7		1–1	2–7	1–2	1–2	1–1	0–6
Lootus	0–1	1–0		1–1	0–3	1–1	1–4	1–3
Maardu Levadia	0–0	4–0	1–0		5–2	2–0	3–0	2–2
Narva Trans	0–5	4–3	0–1	1–1		3–0	0–1	0–3
Tallinna Levadia	2–1	6–0	1–1	0–5	0–4		1–3	1–2
Tulevik	1–5	3–0	4–1	0–1	1–2	2–0		4–4
TVMK	2–3	6–0	8–0	0–4	2–2	2–3	3–6	

Legend: Blue = home team win; Yellow = draw; Red = away team win.

== Top scorers ==
Rank	Player	Club	Goals
1	(Estonia) Andrei Krõlov	TVMK	37
2	(Estonia) Maksim Gruznov	Narva Trans	24
3	(Norway) Tor Henning Hamre	Flora	23
4	(Estonia) Vjatšeslav Zahovaiko	Tulevik	20
5	(Estonia) Dmitri Ustritski	Tulevik	16
6	(Estonia) Vitali Leitan	Levadia	14
7	(Estonia) Vladimir Tšelnokov	Levadia	12
8	(Estonia) Argo Arbeiter	Levadia	11
8	(Estonia) Aleksandr Kulik	Flora	11
8	(Estonia) Ingemar Teever	TVMK	11

== See also ==
- 2001–02 Estonian Cup
- 2002–03 Estonian Cup
- 2002 Esiliiga
