= Jan Õun =

Estonian footballer

Personal information
- Full name: Jan Õun
- Date of birth: 8 February 1977 (age 49)
- Place of birth: Estonia
- Height: 1.74 m (5 ft 8 1/2 in)
- Position: Forward

International career^{‡}
Years	Team	Apps	(Gls)
1995–1998	Estonia	4	(0)
- ‡ National team caps and goals as of 1 June 2009

Jan Õun (born 8 February 1977) is a retired football (soccer) forward from Estonia. He played for several clubs in his native country, including JK Viljandi Tulevik and FC Kuressaare.

== International career ==
Õun earned his first official cap for the Estonia national football team on 19 May 1995, when Estonia played Latvia at the Baltic Cup 1995. He obtained a total number of four caps for his native country.
