= 1990 Estonian SSR Football Championship =

Estonian SSR Higher League
- Season: 1990
- Champions: TVMK; 1st title
- Top goalscorer: Martin Reim (18); Norma

The 1990 Estonian SSR Football Championship was won by TVMK. Fosforiit Tallinn and Sport Tallinn played in 1990 Baltic League.

== League table ==
Pos	Team	Pld	W	D	L	GF	GA	GD	Pts
1	TVMK (C)	22	16	5	1	63	19	+44	37
2	Norma	22	16	3	3	68	34	+34	35
3	Kohtla-Järve Keemik	22	16	3	3	49	20	+29	35
4	Estonia Jõhvi	22	15	4	3	57	16	+41	34
5	Kalakombinaat/MEK Pärnu	22	8	6	8	39	46	−7	22
6	Viljandi JK	22	6	7	9	36	37	−1	19
7	Tempo	22	6	6	10	23	43	−20	18
8	Dvigatel	22	5	6	11	30	37	−7	16
9	Baltika Narva	22	5	6	11	31	49	−18	16
10	Sillamäe Kalev	22	4	7	11	23	45	−22	15
11	KEK Jõgeva/Merkuur Tartu (R)	22	5	2	15	30	54	−24	12
12	Flora (R)	22	1	3	18	25	74	−49	5

(C) Champions; (R) Relegated
