= Kuressaare linnastaadion =

Stadium in Saaremaa, Estonia

Coordinates: 58°14′32.23″N 22°28′48.62″E

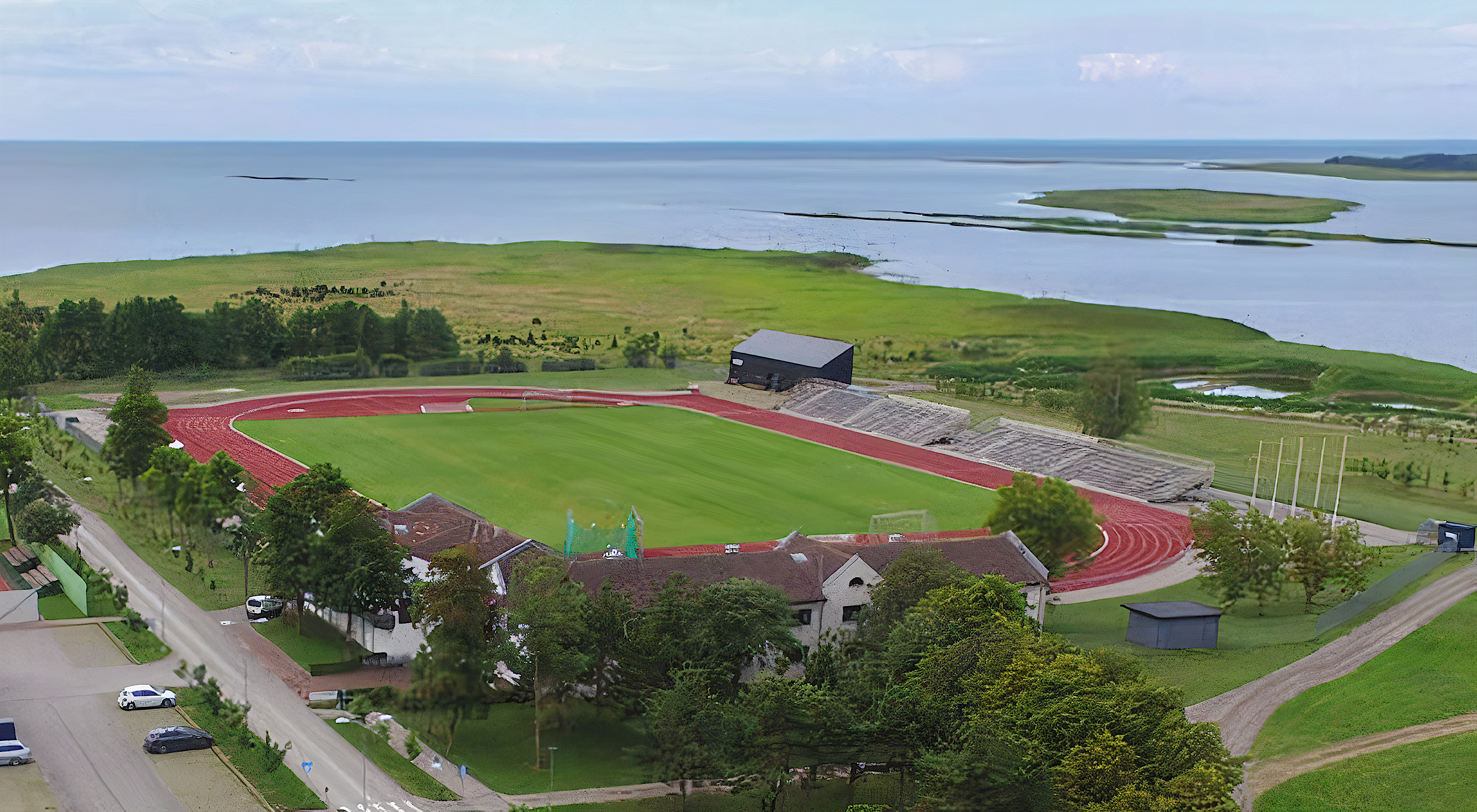
- Interactive map of Kuressaare linnastaadion
- Location: Kuressaare, Saaremaa island, Estonia
- Owner: Town of Kuressaare
- Operator: Saaremaa Spordikool
- Capacity: 2,000
- Surface: Grass
- Field size: 100 × 60 m

Construction
- Opened: 31 August 1958; 67 years ago
- Renovated: 2014
- Cost: €2.1 million (2014)

Tenant
- FC Kuressaare (1997–present)

Kuressaare linnastaadion is a multi-purpose stadium in Kuressaare, Estonia. It is currently used mostly for football matches and hosts the matches of FC Kuressaare. The stadiums seated capacity is 2,000.

The stadium was opened in 1958 and renovated in 2014.

Kuressaare linnastaadion has also hosted six official Estonian national football team matches, with the last one taking place in 2008.

== Estonia national team matches ==
Date		Result	Competition	Attendance
22 June 1997	Estonia – Andorra	4–1	Friendly	1,500
22 June 1998	Estonia – Andorra	2–1	Friendly	1,000
15 November 2000	Estonia – Kyrgyzstan	1–0	Friendly	750
9 May 2001	Estonia – Finland	1–1	Friendly	1,700
3 July 2002	Estonia – Azerbaijan	0–0	Friendly	2,100
22 November 2008	Estonia – Lithuania	1–1	Friendly	800

== Gallery ==
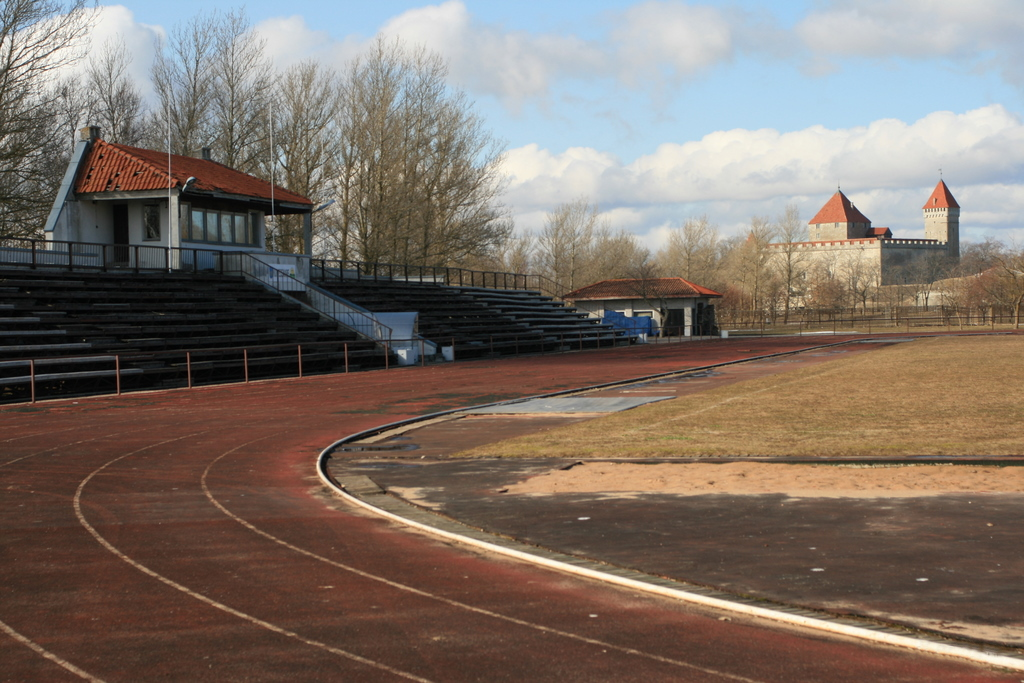
The stadium before the renovation works in 2011

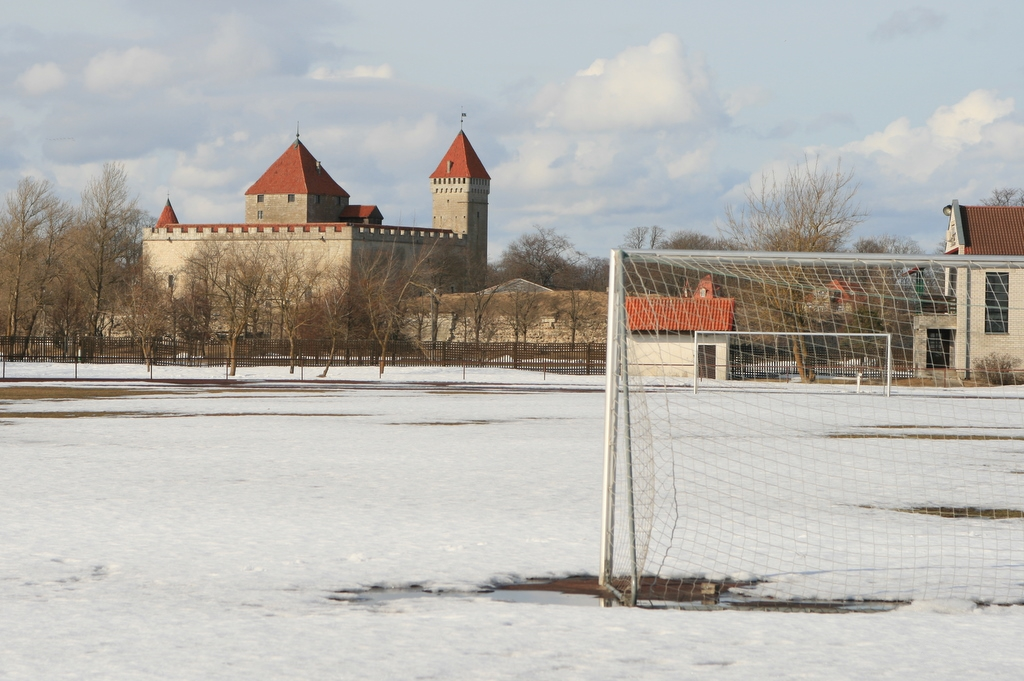
The stadium with the historic Kuressaare Castle in the background
