= Mattias Männilaan =

Estonian footballer (born 2001)

Personal information
- Date of birth: 8 September 2001 (age 25)
- Place of birth: Tallinn, Estonia
- Height: 1.89 m (6 ft 2 in)
- Position: Centre-forward

Team information
- Current team: Nõmme Kalju
- Number: 27

Youth career
- -2017: FC Flora

Senior career*
Years	Team	Apps	(Gls)
2017–2025	FC Flora U21	48	(12)
2019	FC Flora	2	(1)
2019–2020	→ Holstein Kiel (loan)	0	(0)
2020–2024	→ FC Kuressaare (loan)	137	(38)
2025	Lincoln Red Imps	10	(3)
2025–	Nõmme Kalju	44	(23)

International career^{‡}
2017–2018	Estonia U17	10	(3)
2018–2020	Estonia U19	11	(0)
2020–2021	Estonia U21	9	(0)
2026–	Estonia	8	(0)
- * Club domestic league appearances and goals as of 17 November 2026 ‡ National team caps and goals as of 16 November 2026

Mattias Männilaan (born 8 September 2001) is an Estonian footballer who plays as a centre-forward for Estonian Premium liiga side Nõmme Kalju FC and the Estonia national team.

== Club career ==
=== Flora ===
Männilaan came through the youth system at FC Flora. He made his debut in the Meistriliiga on 16 May 2018, coming off the bench in a 2–1 win against FC Kuressaare. He scored his first goal in Meistriliiga later on in the same season in a 6–0 victory against Pärnu JK Vaprus.

=== Holstein Kiel ===
Männilaan spent the first half of the following season rehabbing from an ankle ligament tear. In spite of the injury, he was sent on loan to Holstein Kiel, a German team then playing in 2. Bundesliga, for the second half of the year. Männilaan was assigned to Holstein's under-19 team, making his debut in A-Junioren Bundesliga on 10 August 2019. He scored his first goal in the league on 8 December against FC Energie Cottbus U19. However, that game would also end up being his last for the team.

=== FC Kuressaare ===
In mid-2020, Männilaan returned to the Estonian Meistriliiga, this time being loaned from FC Flora to FC Kuressaare. He made his debut for the team on 17 July 2020. In his second game for the team, Männilaan scored 4 goals in an 18–0 home win against Anija JK in the national cup. He finished the 2020 Meistriliiga season with 4 goals and 2 assists. After finishing 9th in the league, Kuressaare ended their season with relegation games against Maardu Linnameeskond. With two goals against Maardu, Männilaan helped the team remain in Meistriliiga.

In the following season, Männilaan continued at FC Kuressaare on loan. In his first full Meistriliiga season, Männilaan was the joint-7th best scorer in the league, scoring 11 goals and helping Kuressaare finish 7th in the league.

Männilaan's loan at Kuressaare was also extended for the 2022 and 2023 Meistriliiga seasons. Kuressaare again improved their form in 2022, finishing the league season at 5th place. As of mid-2023, Männilaan was again among the top scorers of the league, having scored 7 goals in the first 25 games of the 2023 season. In June 2024, Männilaan was chosen as FC Kuressaare's best player of the month by head coach Roman Kožuhhovski.

=== Lincoln Red Imps ===
On 8 January 2025, Männilaan signed for Gibraltar Premier Division club Lincoln Red Imps on an initial six-month contract with the option for a further year.

== Career statistics ==
=== Club ===
As of 17 November 2026

Appearances and goals by club, season and competition
Club	Season	League			National cup		Continental		Total	
Club	Season	Division	Apps	Goals	Apps	Goals	Apps	Goals	Apps	Goals
FC Flora U21	2017	Esiliiga	4	2	1	1	—		4	2
FC Flora U21	2018	Esiliiga	33	9	4	4	—		37	13
FC Flora U21	2019	Esiliiga	11	1	—		—		11	1
FC Flora U21	Total		48	12	5	5	0	0	53	17
FC Flora	2018	Meistriliiga	2	1	—		—		2	1
FC Kuressaare	2020	Meistriliiga	14	4	3	8	—		17	12
FC Kuressaare	2021	Meistriliiga	25	11	3	4	—		28	15
FC Kuressaare	2022	Meistriliiga	28	9	3	5	—		31	14
FC Kuressaare	2023	Meistriliiga	35	8	2	1	—		37	9
FC Kuressaare	2024	Meistriliiga	35	10	1	3	—		36	13
FC Kuressaare	Total		137	42	12	21	0	0	149	63
Lincoln Red Imps	2024–25	Gibraltar Football League	10	3	2	0	—		12	3
FC Kuressaare	2025	Meistriliiga	17	8	2	2	4 (Note: Appearances in UEFA Conference League)	2	0	0
FC Kuressaare	2026	Meistriliiga	27	15	1	0	—		0	0
FC Kuressaare	Total		44	23	3	2	4	2	51	27
Career total			252	82	22	28	4	2	278	112

=== International ===
As of match played 16 November 2026

Appearances and goals by national team and year
National team	Year	Apps	Goals
Estonia	2026	8	0
Total		8	0
