= Stanislav Kitto =

Estonian footballer

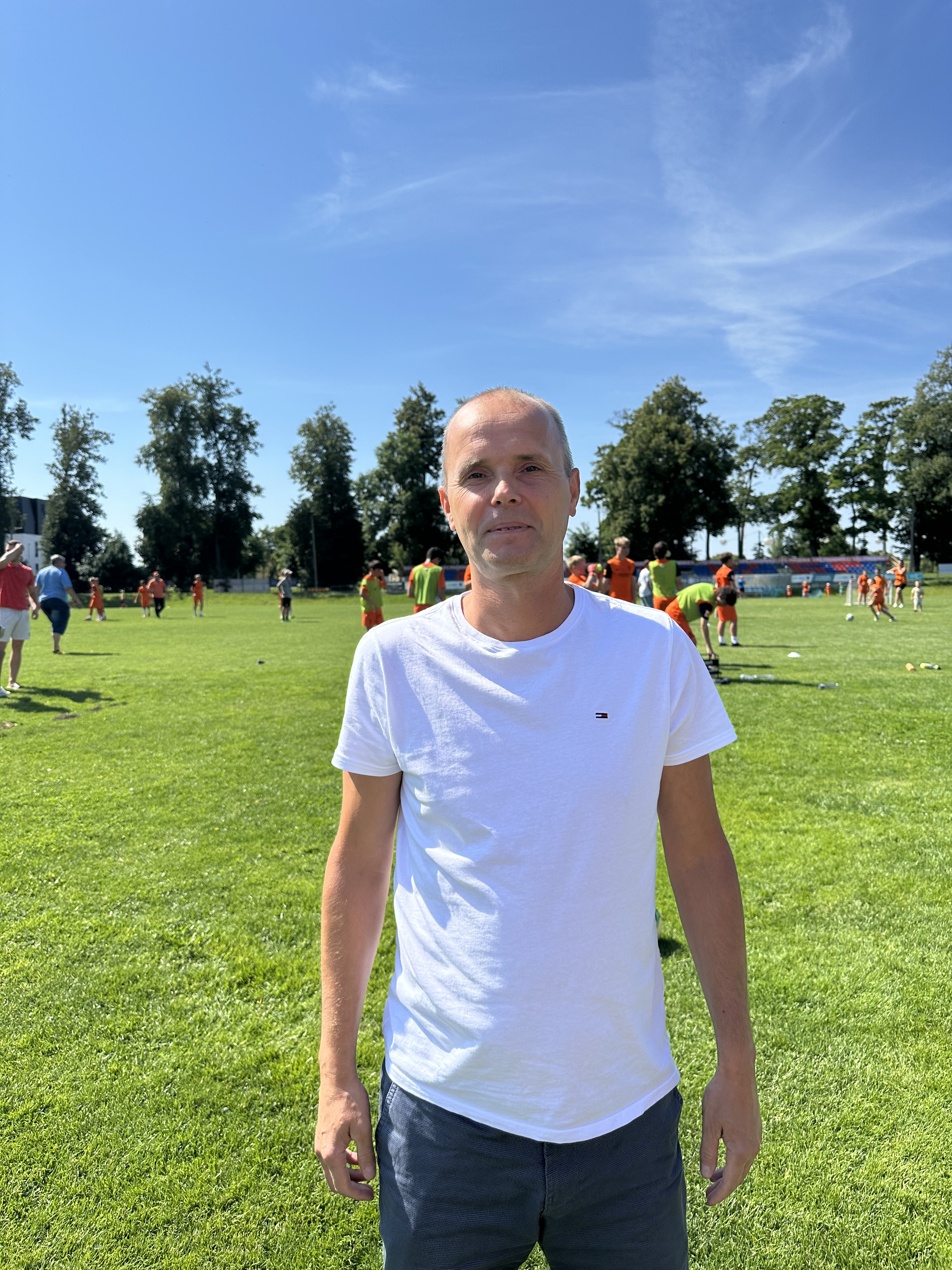

Personal information
- Full name: Stanislav Kitto
- Date of birth: 30 November 1972 (age 53)
- Height: 1.86 m (6 ft 1 in)
- Position: Midfielder

Senior career*
Years	Team	Apps	(Gls)
1992–1998	Trans Narva	145	(35)
1995–1996	→ Zorya Luhansk (loan)	4	(0)
1999–2000	FK Rīga	28	(4)
2000	→ Daugava Rīga (loan)	11	(0)
2001	TVMK Tallinn	18	(2)
2002–2014	Trans Narva	309	(21)
Total		515	(62)
- * Club domestic league appearances and goals

Stanislav Kitto (born 30 November 1972) is a former professional footballer, who last played in Estonian Meistriliiga, for JK Trans Narva. He played the position of midfielder. His former clubs include FC TVMK Tallinn and FK Rīga.

He is the Meistriliiga all-time appearances leader with 515 caps.
