= Enver Jääger =

Estonian footballer

Personal information
- Full name: Enver Jääger
- Date of birth: 28 October 1982 (age 44)
- Place of birth: Kohila, Estonia
- Height: 1.80 m (5 ft 11 in)
- Position: Striker

International career
Years	Team	Apps	(Gls)
2000–2004	Estonia	2	(0)

Enver Jääger (born 28 October 1982 in Kohila) is a former Estonian footballer. He was a striker, and is 1.80 m tall. He played two games for the Estonia national football team.

== Personal ==
He has a younger brother, Enar Jääger, who plays football for Vålerenga Fotball on loan from FC Flora.
