= Tor Henning Hamre =

Norwegian footballer (born 1979)

Personal information
- Full name: Tor Henning Hamre
- Date of birth: 24 April 1979 (age 47)
- Place of birth: Flekkefjord, Vest-Agder, Norway
- Height: 1.87 m (6 ft 1 1/2 in)
- Position: Centre forward

Senior career*
Years	Team	Apps	(Gls)
1997–1999	Kvinesdal	61	(52)
2000–2001	Mandalskameratene	38	(30)
2002–2003	Flora Tallinn	50	(62)
2004	Vålerenga	4	(0)
2004	Vålerenga 2	16	(32)
2005–2006	Mandalskameratene	41	(11)
2006	Herfølge	9	(2)
Total		219	(189)
- * Club domestic league appearances and goals

Tor Henning Hamre (born 24 April 1979) is a Norwegian former footballer who played as a striker.

In 2003, he scored an impressive 39 goals, which saw him win the Meistriliiga top scorer award, and even put him in contention for the ESM Golden Boot. He also scored in 15 consecutive games, tallying 21 goals in that streak, a record in world football before Lionel Messi surpassed him by netting in 21 straight league games during the 2013–14 season.
