= 2003 Meistriliiga =

Estonian national championships in football

Meistriliiga
- Season: 2003
- Champions: Flora; 7th title
- Relegated: Kuressaare
- Champions League: Flora
- UEFA Cup: TVMK; Levadia Maardu
- Intertoto Cup: Narva Trans
- Matches: 140
- Goals: 423 (3.02 per match)
- Top goalscorer: Tor Henning Hamre (39)

The 2003 Meistriliiga was the 13th season of the Meistriliiga, the top Estonian league for association football clubs, since its establishment in 1992.

Flora won their 7th Meistriliiga title.

== League table ==
| Pos | Team | Pld | W | D | L | GF | GA | GD | Pts | Qualification or relegation |
|---|---|---|---|---|---|---|---|---|---|---|
| 1 | Flora (C) | 28 | 24 | 4 | 0 | 105 | 21 | +84 | 76 | Qualification for Champions League first qualifying round |
| 2 | TVMK | 28 | 20 | 5 | 3 | 82 | 26 | +56 | 65 | Qualification for UEFA Cup first qualifying round (Note: Levadia Maardu qualified as 2003–04 Estonian Cup winners.) |
| 3 | Levadia Maardu (Note: Levadia Maardu changed their name to Levadia Tallinn in 2004.) | 28 | 15 | 4 | 9 | 54 | 30 | +24 | 49 | Qualification for UEFA Cup first qualifying round |
| 4 | Narva Trans | 28 | 14 | 5 | 9 | 58 | 43 | +15 | 47 | Qualification for Intertoto Cup first round |
| 5 | Tulevik | 28 | 8 | 6 | 14 | 44 | 56 | −12 | 30 | |
| 6 | Levadia Tallinn (Note: Levadia Tallinn changed their name to Levadia II Tallinn in 2004.) | 28 | 8 | 4 | 16 | 44 | 63 | −19 | 28 | |
| 7 | Valga | 28 | 3 | 8 | 17 | 25 | 63 | −38 | 17 | Qualification for relegation play-offs |
| 8 | Kuressaare (R) | 28 | 1 | 2 | 25 | 11 | 121 | −110 | 5 | Relegation to Esiliiga |

Source: Estonian Football Association (in Estonian)
Rules for classification: 1) points; 2) number of wins; 3) head-to-head points; 4) head-to-head goal difference; 5) head-to-head goals scored; 6) goal difference; 7) number of goals scored.
(C) Champions; (R) Relegated

=== Relegation play-off ===
12 November 2003

| Tervis Pärnu | 2–2 | Valga |
|---|---|---|
| Valejev 24'; Savotškin 28' | | Raamat 10'; Tarassenkov 37' |

22 November 2003

| Valga | 3–0 | Tervis Pärnu |
|---|---|---|
| Antonov 33'; Tarassenkov 43'; Anniste 54' |

Valga won 5–2 on aggregate and retained their Meistriliiga spot for the 2004 season.

== Results ==
Each team played every opponent four times, twice at home and twice on the road, for a total of 36 games.

=== First half of season ===
| Home \ Away | FLO | KUR | LMA | LTA | TRS | TUL | TVM | VAL |
|---|---|---|---|---|---|---|---|---|
| Flora | | 7–1 | 2–0 | 3–0 | 2–2 | 3–1 | 2–2 | 3–2 |
| Kuressaare | 0–4 | | 0–6 | 3–9 | 0–3 | 0–4 | 0–4 | 2–1 |
| Levadia Maardu | 1–2 | 7–0 | | 1–0 | 1–0 | 1–4 | 0–3 | 0–0 |
| Levadia Tallinn | 1–4 | 4–2 | 2–3 | | 0–1 | 2–1 | 0–3 | 2–1 |
| Narva Trans | 1–3 | 3–0 | 1–0 | 2–1 | | 2–2 | 1–2 | 4–0 |
| Tulevik | 0–2 | 0–0 | 0–2 | 3–1 | 1–1 | | 0–0 | 3–3 |
| TVMK | 4–4 | 3–0 | 1–1 | 0–0 | 4–0 | 4–0 | | 4–1 |
| Valga | 0–4 | 0–0 | 0–3 | 1–1 | 2–2 | 1–2 | 0–3 | |

Source: RSSSF
Legend: Blue = home team win; Yellow = draw; Red = away team win.

=== Second half of season ===
| Home \ Away | FLO | KUR | LMA | LTA | TRS | TUL | TVM | VAL |
|---|---|---|---|---|---|---|---|---|
| Flora | | 17–0 | 1–0 | 4–1 | 2–0 | 2–1 | 2–0 | 5–0 |
| Kuressaare | 0–6 | | 0–2 | 0–5 | 1–3 | 0–3 | 0–2 | 0–1 |
| Levadia Maardu | 1–3 | 2–0 | | 4–0 | 5–3 | 3–0 | 1–4 | 0–0 |
| Levadia Tallinn | 1–3 | 3–1 | 1–1 | | 1–3 | 4–2 | 1–4 | 0–0 |
| Narva Trans | 0–0 | 8–0 | 5–1 | 1–2 | | 3–2 | 2–0 | 3–0 |
| Tulevik | 0–5 | 5–0 | 0–1 | 2–0 | 3–4 | | 1–3 | 3–1 |
| TVMK | 1–3 | 5–0 | 2–0 | 6–1 | 4–3 | 8–1 | | 3–1 |
| Valga | 1–7 | 4–1 | 0–3 | 4–1 | 0–1 | 0–0 | 1–3 | |

Source: RSSSF
Legend: Blue = home team win; Yellow = draw; Red = away team win.

== Top scorers ==
| Rank | Player | Club | Goals |
|---|---|---|---|
| 1 | (Norway) Tor Henning Hamre | Flora | 35 |
| 2 | (Estonia) Andrei Krõlov | TVMK | 22 |
| 3 | (Estonia) Ingemar Teever | TVMK | 21 |
| 4 | (Estonia) Maksim Gruznov | Narva Trans | 16 |
| 5 | (Estonia) Argo Arbeiter | Levadia Maardu | 14 |
| 5 | (Estonia) Vjatšeslav Zahovaiko | Flora | 14 |
| 7 | (Russia) Dmitri Lipartov | Narva Trans | 12 |
| 7 | (Estonia) Vladimir Tšelnokov | Levadia Maardu | 12 |
| 9 | (Estonia) Enver Jääger | Tulevik | 11 |
| 9 | (Estonia) Maksim Rõtškov | Levadia Maardu | 11 |
| 9 | (Estonia) Kristen Viikmäe | Flora | 11 |

== See also ==
- 2002–03 Estonian Cup
- 2003–04 Estonian Cup
- 2003 Esiliiga
