= Aleksandr Kulik =

Estonian footballer (born 1981)

Personal information
- Full name: Aleksandr Kulik
- Date of birth: 23 July 1981 (age 45)
- Place of birth: Sillamäe, then part of Estonian SSR, Soviet Union
- Height: 1.93 m (6 ft 4 in)
- Positions: Defender; striker

Senior career*
Years	Team	Apps	(Gls)
2000–2001	Sillamäe Kalev	16	(1)
2001–2003	FC Flora	41	(27)
2003	Viljandi Tulevik	6	(5)
2004–2007	Narva Trans	103	(10)
2006	→ Astana (loan)	11	(2)
2008	RoPS	23	(4)
2009–2011	Sillamäe Kalev	84	(15)
2011–2012	Narva Trans	31	(2)
2019–2023	Sillamäe Kalev	74	(21)
2023–	FC NPM Silmet	35	(7)
- * Club domestic league appearances and goals as of 3 March 2013

Aleksandr Kulik (born 23 July 1981) is an Estonian footballer.

Kulik was born in Sillamäe, and plays in the Estonian Meistriliiga for JK Sillamäe Kalev. He plays the position of defender or striker and is 1.93 m tall.

In 2013, he, along with seven other players, was found guilty of match fixing by the Estonian Football Association and received a six-year ban until 2019. After his ban expired he once again joined his hometown team JK Sillamäe Kalev, who were relegated to the fourth division in 2018 after declaring bankruptcy.
