= Kohtla-Järve FC Lootus =

Defunct association football club in Estonia

- Full name: Kohtla-Järve football club Lootus
- Founded: 1998
- Dissolved: 2012
- Ground: Spordikeskuse Staadion, Kohtla-Järve
- 2012: Esiliiga, 10th

Kohtla-Järve FC Lootus was an Estonian football club from Kohtla-Järve. The club was created in 1998 and dissolved in 2012, when they merged with Kohtla-Järve JK Alko, which resulted in creating a new club Kohtla-Järve JK Järve.

== Kohtla-Järve in Estonian football ==
| Season | League | Pos | Pld | W | D | L | GF | GA | GD | Pts | Top Scorer |
|---|---|---|---|---|---|---|---|---|---|---|---|
| 1998 | Esiliiga | 3 | 14 | 6 | 4 | 4 | 21 | 19 | +2 | 22 | Viktor Predbannikov (7) |
| 1999 | Esiliiga | 2 | 28 | 21 | 2 | 5 | 81 | 33 | +48 | 65 | Konstantin Karin (23) |
| 2000 | Meistriliiga | 6 | 28 | 6 | 4 | 18 | 26 | 54 | -28 | 22 | Konstantin Golitsõn (8) |
| 2001 | Meistriliiga | 7 | 28 | 4 | 5 | 19 | 21 | 53 | -32 | 17 | Konstantin Golitsõn (5) |
| 2002 | Meistriliiga | 7 | 28 | 5 | 6 | 17 | 24 | 67 | -43 | 21 | Anton Semjonov and Konstantin Golitsõn (5) |
| 2003 | Esiliiga | 1 | 28 | 21 | 4 | 3 | 77 | 23 | +54 | 67 | Sergei Popov (17) |
| 2004 | Meistriliiga | 8 | 28 | 1 | 2 | 25 | 11 | 117 | -106 | 5 | Irfan Ametov (6) |
| 2005 | II Liiga North/East | 2 | 28 | 16 | 4 | 8 | 69 | 51 | +18 | 52 | Konstantin Karin (24) |
| 2006 | Esiliiga | 8 | 36 | 10 | 3 | 23 | 46 | 99 | -53 | 33 | Anton Semjonov (12) |
| 2007 | II Liiga North/East | 10 | 26 | 6 | 9 | 11 | 48 | 48 | 0 | 27 | Anton Semjonov (16) |
| 2008 | II Liiga North/East | 1 | 26 | 22 | 3 | 1 | 113 | 13 | +100 | 69 | Anton Semjonov (28) |
| 2009 | Esiliiga | 2 | 36 | 24 | 2 | 10 | 88 | 48 | +40 | 74 | Vitali Bolšakov (24) |
| 2010 | Meistriliiga | 10 | 36 | 6 | 2 | 28 | 22 | 103 | -81 | 20 | Vassili Kulik (8) |
| 2011 | Esiliiga | 7 | 36 | 9 | 11 | 16 | 59 | 75 | -16 | 38 | Andrei Jõgi (12) |
| 2012 | Esiliiga | 10 | 36 | 6 | 1 | 29 | 40 | 103 | -63 | 15 | Vjatšeslav Smirnov (6) |
| Meistriliiga | | | 148 | 22 | 19 | 107 | 104 | 394 | -290 | 85 | |

E/N – Eastern/Northern Zone
