= 1998 Meistriliiga =

Estonian national championships in football

Meistriliiga
- Season: 1998
- Champions: Flora (4th title)
- Top goalscorer: Konstantin Nahk (13)

The 1998 Meistriliiga was the eighth season of the Meistriliiga, Estonia's premier football league. The season was unusually short, played in the second half of 1998 to switch back to Nordic spring-to-autumn season format in the next year. Flora won their fourth title.

== League table ==
Pos	Team	Pld	W	D	L	GF	GA	GD	Pts	Qualification or relegation
1	Flora (C)	14	11	2	1	46	14	+32	35	Qualification for Champions League first qualifying round
2	Tallinna Sadam	14	11	1	2	48	10	+38	34	Qualification for UEFA Cup qualifying round
3	Lantana	14	7	4	3	27	20	+7	25	Qualification for UEFA Cup qualifying round
4	Narva Trans	14	6	5	3	28	20	+8	23	Qualification for Intertoto Cup first round
5	Tulevik	14	5	3	6	15	25	−10	18	Qualification for UEFA Cup qualifying round
6	TVMK	14	3	4	7	15	27	−12	13	
7	Eesti Põlevkivi Jõhvi	14	2	0	12	10	44	−34	6	Qualification for relegation play-offs
8	Lelle	14	0	3	11	10	39	−29	3	Relegation to Esiliiga (Note: Lelle kept their place in the Meistriliiga as after the season's end Tallinna Sadam and FC Levadia Maardu merged, with the first team playing as FC Levadia Maardu in the Meistriliiga 1999 and, the second team as FC Maardu in the Esiliiga 1999.)

Source: rsssf.com
(C) Champions

=== Relegation play-off ===
Vigri	0–2	Eesti Põlevkivi Jõhvi

Eesti Põlevkivi Jõhvi	0–0	Vigri

Eesti Põlevkivi Jõhvi won 5-2 on aggregate and retained their Meistriliiga spot for the 1999 season.

== Results ==
Home \ Away	JEP	FLO	LAN	LEL	TRS	SAD	TUL	TVM
Eesti Põlevkivi Jõhvi		2–7	1–2	1–0	0–1	0–3	0–2	0–2
Flora	6–0		3–0	6–1	3–3	0–3	1–0	3–0
Lantana	4–1	3–3		1–1	3–3	0–1	3–0	0–0
Lelle	1–2	2–5	0–2		1–5	0–7	0–0	1–1
Narva Trans	5–1	0–1	1–3	1–0		0–0	4–1	2–2
Tallinna Sadam	6–2	0–1	5–1	3–2	5–0		3–0	4–0
Tulevik	1–0	0–5	0–3	3–0	0–0	4–3		2–1
TVMK	4–0	0–2	1–2	2–1	0–3	0–5	2–2	

Legend: Blue = home team win; Yellow = draw; Red = away team win.

== Top scorers ==
Rank	Player	Club	Goals
1	(Estonia) Konstantin Kolbasenko	Tallinna Sadam	13
2	(Estonia) Andrei Krõlov	Tallinna Sadam	10
2	(Estonia) Andres Oper	Flora	10
2	(Estonia) Indrek Zelinski	Flora	10
5	(Russia) Dmitri Lipartov	Narva Trans	7
5	(Lithuania) Tomas Ražanauskas	Flora	7
