= Dmitry Lipartov =

Russian footballer

Personal information
- Full name: Dmitry Viktorovich Lipartov
- Date of birth: 2 April 1973 (age 53)
- Place of birth: Leningrad, USSR
- Height: 1.72 m (5 ft 8 in)
- Position: Forward

Senior career*
Years	Team	Apps	(Gls)
1991–1992	Smena-Saturn St. Petersburg	5	(0)
1993	Atommash Volgodonsk	24	(8)
1994	Kuban Slavyansk	10	(1)
1995	Shanghai Dashun		
1996–1997	Shanghai Yuyuan		
1997	Sport St. Petersburg		
1998–2008	Narva Trans	282	(136)
2008–2011	Sillamäe Kalev	48	(16)
- * Club domestic league appearances and goals

Dmitry Viktorovich Lipartov (Russian: Дмитрий Викторович Липартов; born 2 April 1973) is a former Russian professional footballer who played as a striker.
