= FC M.C. Tallinn =

Estonian football club

- Full name: FC M.C. Tallinn
- Founded: 1995
- Dissolved: 2014
- Ground: Kernu Põhikooli staadion
- League: II Liiga West/South
- 2013: II Liiga East/North, 8th

FC M.C. Tallinn is a defunct Estonian football club.
