= FC Kuressaare =

Estonian football club

Kuressaare
- Full name: FC Kuressaare
- Nicknames: Kure; Viikingid (The Vikings)
- Founded: 14 March 1997; 29 years ago
- Ground: Kuressaare linnastaadion
- Capacity: 2,000
- President: Priit Penu
- Manager: Sander Post
- League: Meistriliiga
- 2026: Meistriliiga, 9th of 10
- Website: http://www.fckuressaare.ee
Home colours	Away colours

FC Kuressaare, commonly known as Kuressaare, is an Estonian professional football club based in Kuressaare, on the island of Saaremaa. The club's home ground is Kuressaare linnastaadion.

Founded on 14 March 1997, the club competes in the Meistriliiga, the top tier of Estonian football. Kuressaare debuted in the Estonian top division in 2000 and were known as a yo-yo club throughout the first decade of the 21st century, as they were promoted and relegated for eight consecutive seasons. Since then, the club has played in the Meistriliiga in 2009–2013 and again since 2018.

== History ==
=== Early history ===
FC Kuressaare was founded on 14 March 1997. Its predecessor was a youth club B.B. Sport, coached by Johannes Kaju. Kuressaare joined the Estonian football league system and began competing in the Western division of the III liiga. The club's first president and manager was Aivar Pohlak. Kuressaare was promoted to the Esiliiga for the 1998 season and finished in 6th place under the new manager Jan Važinski. Most of the team were Saaremaa locals who were reinforced by players from Kuressaare's parent club Flora. Kuressaare won the Esiliiga in the 1999 season and was promoted to the Meistriliiga.

Kuressaare finished the 2000 season, its maiden season in the Estonian top-flight, in 7th place out of 8 teams. The club finished the 2001 season in last place under head coach Zaur Tšilingarašvili and was relegated to the Esiliiga. In 2002, Sergei Zamogilnõi was hired as manager and Kuressaare finished the 2002 season as runners-up, qualifying to the promotion play-offs. Kuressaare won the play-offs against Lootus and returned to the Meistriliiga, where their stay was cut short again as the club finished the 2003 season at the bottom of the table and was relegated. The team was restructured in 2004 using players from reserve team Sörve and was promoted back to the Meistriliiga despite finishing in 5th place due to the expansion of the league.

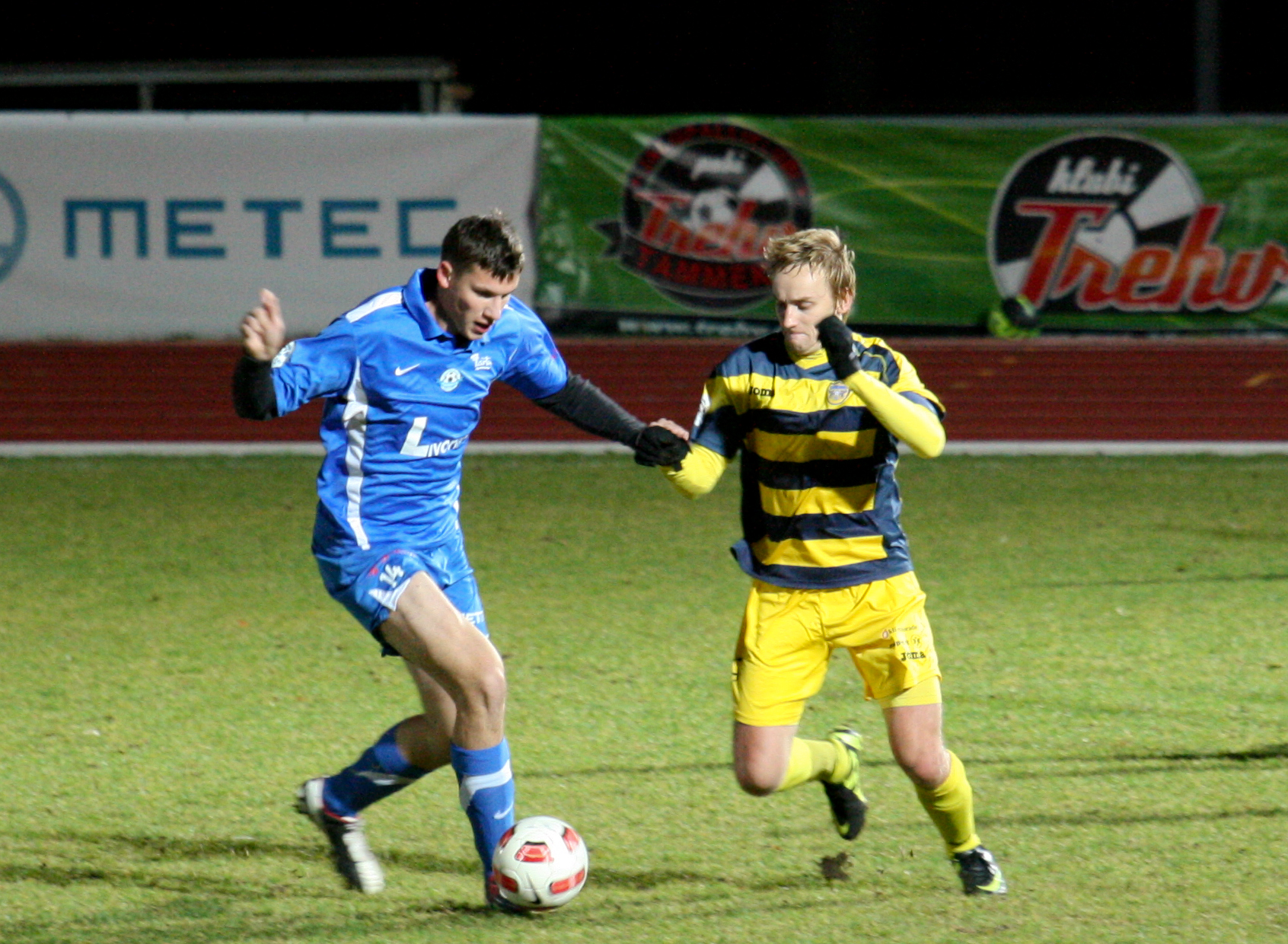
FC Kuressaare's Martti Pukk facing Tammeka in 2011

The 2005 season was the most successful in the club's earlier history, winning 7 and drawing 6 matches out of 36. The 8–1 victory over Dünamo became the new club record. Despite that, the team finished 9th and was relegated after losing the relegation play-offs against Ajax. Kuressaare earned its way back to the Meistriliiga in the 2006 season, but was once again relegated in the following Meistriliiga season. The team finished the 2008 season as runners-up and was promoted to the Meistriliiga. Kuressaare remained in the Meistriliiga for the next five seasons from 2009 to 2013, when the club was relegated to Esiliiga after finishing the season in 10th place. After the 2015 season, Kuressaare were relegated to Esiliiga B, which they won the following season.

=== Return to top-flight football ===
After finishing 5th in the Estonian second tier Esiliiga during the 2017 season, FC Kuressaare were unexpectedly offered the chance to return to Meistriliiga, due to FC Infonet and Sillamäe Kalev leaving top-flight football and Maardu Linnameeskond and Rakvere Tarvas, who both finished in front of Kuressaare in the 2017 Esiliiga season, opting to not fill the vacant Meistriliiga spots. Jan Važinski returned to the manager role and Kuressaare finished the 2018 Meistriliiga season in ninth place, beating FC Elva in the relegation play-offs to maintain their spot in Estonian top-flight football. The following 2019 season concluded in a similar way, with Kuressaare finishing in ninth place and this time beating Pärnu Vaprus in the play-offs.

With the introduction of solidarity mechanisms in 2020, Marco Lukka became the first ever fully professional football player of the club. Kuressaare also appointed Roman Kozhukhovskyi as the manager and moved their first team trainings to Tallinn, having previously operated with two separate training groups (one in Tallinn, one in Kuressaare). Again, FC Kuressaare finished the season in 9th place and won the relegation play-offs against Maardu. The 2021 season proved to be successful for the club, as they finished in seventh place. Otto-Robert Lipp's goal against FC Flora in their 2–2 draw also won the Meistriliiga's 'goal of the season' award.

The 2022 season was the most successful in FC Kuressaare's history, as the club finished 5th and accumulated 50 points in 36 matches.

== Kit manufacturers and shirt sponsors ==
Period	Kit manufacturer	Shirt sponsor	Ref
2013–2018	Joma	Saaremaa Lihatööstus	
2019	Nike	Euronics	
2020–2023	Nike	–	
2023–	Nike	Visit Saaremaa	

== Stadium ==
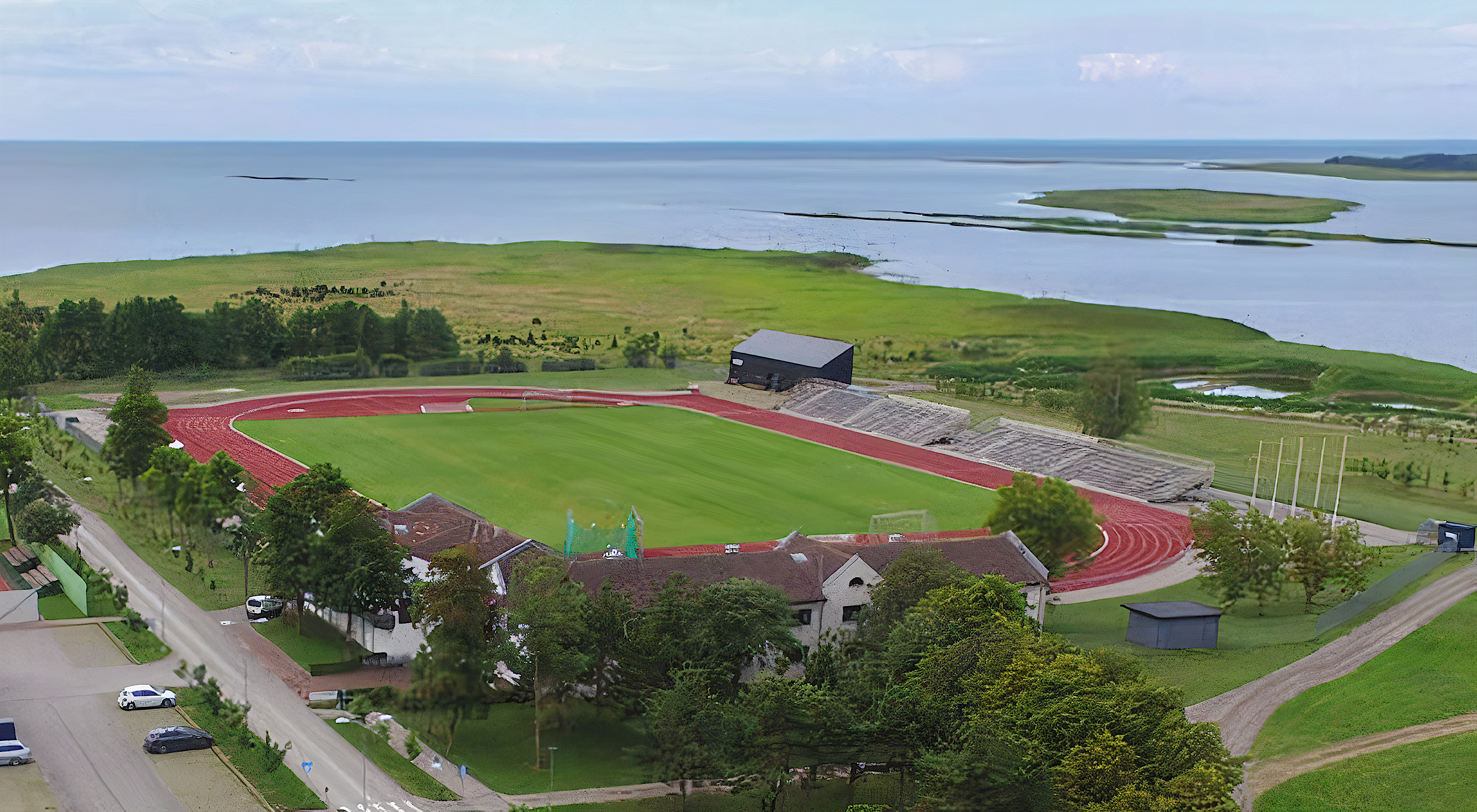
Kuressaare linnastaadion is situated right along the Kuressaare Bay of the Baltic Sea

The club's home ground is the 2000-capacity Kuressaare linnastaadion. The stadium was first opened in 1958 and last renovated in 2014. During winter and early spring months, the club plays its home matches at the 200-seat Kuressaare kunstmurustaadion artificial turf ground. An indoor football facility named Saaremaa Nooruse Hall, fitted with a FIFA Quality Pro artificial turf ground, was opened in 2024 and cost €5.3 million to construct.

Since 2020, FC Kuressaare's first team has been training in Tallinn, and only travels to the Saaremaa island for home matches. Until 2019, the first team operated with two separate training groups, with half of the team training in Tallinn and the other half in Kuressaare.

== Players ==
=== First-team squad ===
As of 6 March 2026.

Note: Flags indicate national team as defined under FIFA eligibility rules; some limited exceptions apply. Players may hold more than one non-FIFA nationality.

No.	Pos.	Nation	Player
5	MF	EST	Sander Sinilaid
7	MF	EST	Rasmus Talu
8	MF	EST	Deivid Andreas (on loan from Flora)
9	MF	EST	Aleksander Švedovski (on loan from FCI Levadia)
10	FW	EST	Andero Kivi
11	FW	EST	Taavi Jürisoo
13	FW	EST	Aston Visse
14	DF	EST	Joosep Kobin
17	FW	EST	Gregor Rõivassepp (on loan from Flora)
18	DF	EST	Mikhail Džemesjuk
21	MF	EST	Marco Lukka
22	GK	EST	Sander Ristna

No.	Pos.	Nation	Player
23	DF	EST	Rasmus Saar
27	DF	EST	Sten Patrick Prunn (on loan from Flora)
28	MF	EST	Roland Lukas
31	GK	EST	Karl-Romet Nõmm (captain)
36	DF	EST	Rico Piil
37	MF	EST	Markus Johannes Leivategija
44	DF	EST	Oscar Joost
58	DF	EST	Alexander Medvedev (on loan from Flora)
68	DF	EST	Johann Vahermägi
70	DF	EST	Joonas Vahermägi
77	FW	EST	Jevgeni Demidov
80	DF	EST	Rando Tarkmeel

== Personnel ==
=== Current technical staff ===
Position	Name
Head coach	(Estonia) Sander Post
Assistant coach	(Estonia) Oskar Mihkel Kalpus
Goalkeeping coach	(Estonia) Magnus Karofeld
Physiotherapist	(Estonia) Laura Lorette Takel
Management
President	(Estonia) Priit Penu
Chief Executive Officer	(Estonia) Martin Tammel

=== Managerial history ===
Dates	Name
1997	(Estonia) Aivar Pohlak
1998–2000	(Estonia) Jan Važinski
2001	(Estonia) Zaur Tšilingarašvili
2002	(Estonia) Sergei Zamogilnõi
2003–2009	(Estonia) Jan Važinski
2009–2013	(Estonia) Sergei Zamogilnõi
2014–2015	(Estonia) Pelle Pohlak
2016–2017	(Estonia) Sander Viira
2018–2019	(Estonia) Jan Važinski
2019	(Latvia) Dmitrijs Kalašņikovs
2020–2024	(Ukraine) Roman Kozhukhovskyi
2025–	(Estonia) Sander Post

== Honours ==
=== League ===
- Esiliiga
  - Winners (1): 1999
- Esiliiga B
  - Winners (1): 2016

== Seasons and statistics ==
Season	Division	Pos	Pld	W	D	L	GF	GA	GD	Pts	Top goalscorer	Cup
1997–98	III liiga (W)	1	6	5	1	0	18	3	+15	16	(Estonia) Toivo Alt (8)	First round
1998	Esiliiga	6	14	4	5	5	20	19	+1	17	(Lithuania) Svajūnas Rauckis (8)	
1999	Esiliiga	1	28	21	4	3	92	25	+67	67	(Lithuania) Svajūnas Rauckis (27)	Fourth round
2000	Meistriliiga	7	28	5	4	19	25	68	−43	19	(Estonia) Risto Kallaste (Estonia) Tarmo Saks (5)	Third round
2001	Meistriliiga	8	28	2	1	25	18	114	−96	7	(Estonia) Tiit Tikenberg (5)	Quarter-finals
2002	Esiliiga	2	28	17	2	9	82	50	+32	53	(Estonia) Tarmo Neemelo (21)	Second round
2003	Meistriliiga	8	28	1	2	25	11	121	–110	5	(Estonia) Tiit Tikenberg (3)	Second round
2004	Esiliiga	5	28	11	2	15	56	70	−14	35	(Estonia) Martti Pukk (13)	Quarter-finals
2005	Meistriliiga	9	36	7	6	23	40	96	−56	27	(Estonia) Martti Pukk (11)	Second round
2006	Esiliiga	2	36	22	5	9	64	44	+20	71	(Estonia) Rainer Veskimäe (12)	Quarter-finals
2007	Meistriliiga	9	36	5	3	28	25	94	−69	18	(Estonia) Dmitri Kulikov (5)	Third round
2008	Esiliiga	2	36	20	9	7	67	35	+32	69	(Estonia) Martti Pukk (14)	Third round
2009	Meistriliiga	8	36	7	3	26	21	99	−78	24	(Russia) Dmitri Skiperski (8)	Fourth round
2010	Meistriliiga	9	36	7	3	26	32	93	−61	24	(Russia) Dmitri Skiperski (9)	Fourth round
2011	Meistriliiga	9	36	7	5	24	28	68	−40	26	(Estonia) Martti Pukk (8)	Third round
2012	Meistriliiga	8	36	5	11	20	31	80	−49	26	(Estonia) Andre Ilves (6)	Fourth round
2013	Meistriliiga	10	36	2	5	29	22	87	−65	11	(Estonia) Andre Ilves (Estonia) Karl Mööl (Estonia) Elari Valmas (4)	Second round
2014	Esiliiga	6	36	14	5	17	69	81	−12	47	(Estonia) Tõnis Koppel (Estonia) Sander Laht (Estonia) Maarek Suursaar (10)	Quarter-finals
2015	Esiliiga	10	36	10	7	19	48	95	−47	37	(Estonia) Sander Laht (14)	Third round
2016	Esiliiga B	1	36	23	7	6	117	48	+69	76	(Estonia) Maarek Suursaar (33)	Third round
2017	Esiliiga	5	36	17	4	15	70	63	+7	55	(Estonia) Sander Laht (17)	Quarter-finals
2018	Meistriliiga	9	36	6	3	27	34	115	−81	21	(Estonia) Sander Laht (15)	Quarter-finals
2019	Meistriliiga	9	36	6	5	25	24	87	−63	23	(Estonia) Märten Pajunurm (7)	Third round
2020	Meistriliiga	9	30	5	9	16	28	63	−35	24	(Estonia) Sander Laht (6)	Third round
2021	Meistriliiga	7	30	10	4	16	39	47	−8	34	(Estonia) Mattias Männilaan (11)	Fourth round
2022	Meistriliiga	5	36	13	11	12	49	51	−2	50	(Estonia) Sten Reinkort (15)	Third round
2023	Meistriliiga	7	36	12	7	17	36	60	−24	43	(Estonia) Mattias Männilaan (8)	Quarter-finals
2024	Meistriliiga	8	36	8	10	18	46	67	−21	34	(Estonia) Mattias Männilaan (10)	Quarter-finals
2025	Meistriliiga	9	36	8	4	24	32	67	−35	28	(Estonia) Märten Pajunurm (Estonia) Andero Kivi (7)	Fourth round
