= FC Valga =

Estonian football club

- FC Valga logo
- Founded: 1990
- Dissolved: 29 November 2005
- League: Meistriliiga
- 2005: 8th

FC Valga was an Estonian football club based in Valga.

The club was founded in 1990 under the name of Valga Lokomotiiv.

The club ceased to exist at the end of 2005, when they joined with FC Warrior Valga, who inherited their place in Meistriliiga.
