= List of Estonia national football team managers =

This is a list of Estonia national football team managers – association football managers who have coached the Estonia national football team.

== Statistical summary ==
As of 16 November 2026.

| Career | Manager | P | W | D | L | Win % |
|---|---|---|---|---|---|---|
| 1920–1923 | No manager | 10 | 2 | 3 | 5 | 20.0 |
| 1923–1924 | (Hungary) Ferenc Kónya | 2 | 0 | 0 | 2 | 0.0 |
| 1924 | No manager | 5 | 0 | 0 | 5 | 0.0 |
| 1925 | (Hungary) Ferenc Nagy | 2 | 2 | 0 | 0 | 100.0 |
| 1925–1926 | No manager | 7 | 2 | 3 | 2 | 28.6 |
| 1927 | (Hungary) Antal Mally | 4 | 3 | 0 | 1 | 75.0 |
| 1927–1929 | No manager | 12 | 3 | 4 | 5 | 25.0 |
| 1930 | (Austria) Fritz Kerr | 6 | 1 | 1 | 4 | 16.7 |
| 1931 | No manager | 7 | 4 | 0 | 3 | 57.1 |
| 1932 | (Estonia) Albert Vollrat | 7 | 1 | 0 | 6 | 14.3 |
| 1933–1934 | No manager | 11 | 3 | 4 | 4 | 27.3 |
| 1935 | (Hungary) Antal Mally | 8 | 0 | 5 | 3 | 0.0 |
| 1936 | No manager | 5 | 1 | 1 | 3 | 20.0 |
| 1936–1938 | (Estonia) Bernard Rein | 16 | 6 | 2 | 8 | 37.5 |
| 1939 | (Estonia) Elmar Saar | 4 | 0 | 1 | 3 | 0.0 |
| 1940 | No manager | 1 | 1 | 0 | 0 | 100.0 |
| 1992–1993 | (Estonia) Uno Piir | 19 | 2 | 4 | 13 | 10.5 |
| 1994–1995 | (Estonia) Roman Ubakivi | 22 | 0 | 1 | 21 | 0.0 |
| 1995 | (Estonia) Aavo Sarap (caretaker) | 2 | 0 | 0 | 2 | 0.0 |
| 1996–1999 | (Iceland) Teitur Thordarson | 57 | 13 | 17 | 27 | 22.8 |
| 1999–2000 | (Estonia) Tarmo Rüütli | 8 | 4 | 2 | 2 | 50.0 |
| 2000 | (Estonia) Aivar Lillevere (caretaker) | 2 | 0 | 0 | 2 | 0.0 |
| 2000–2004 | (Netherlands) Arno Pijpers | 55 | 16 | 14 | 25 | 29.1 |
| 2004–2007 | (Netherlands) Jelle Goes | 29 | 5 | 6 | 18 | 17.2 |
| 2007 | (Denmark) Viggo Jensen | 8 | 2 | 2 | 4 | 25.0 |
| 2008–2013 | (Estonia) Tarmo Rüütli | 79 | 24 | 16 | 39 | 30.4 |
| 2013–2016 | (Sweden) Magnus Pehrsson | 33 | 11 | 8 | 14 | 33.3 |
| 2016–2019 | (Estonia) Martin Reim | 36 | 13 | 8 | 15 | 36.1 |
| 2019–2020 | (Estonia) Karel Voolaid | 14 | 0 | 4 | 10 | 0.0 |
| 2021 | (Estonia) Martin Reim (caretaker) | 3 | 0 | 0 | 3 | 0.0 |
| 2021–2024 | (Switzerland) Thomas Häberli | 36 | 10 | 7 | 19 | 27.8 |
| 2024– | (Estonia) Jürgen Henn | 28 | 9 | 8 | 11 | 32.1 |

== See also ==
- Estonia national football team
