= Viljandi JK Tulevik =

Estonian football club

Tulevik
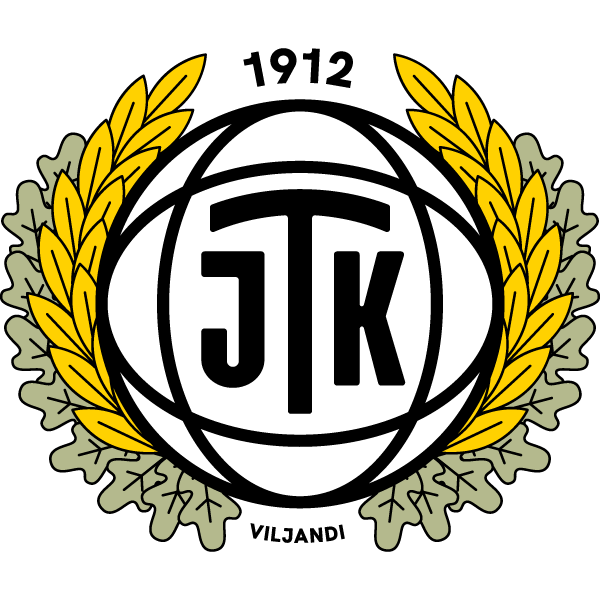
- Full name: Viljandi Jalgpalliklubi Tulevik
- Founded: 23 September 1912; 114 years ago Re-established in 1992; 34 years ago
- Ground: Viljandi linnastaadion
- Capacity: 1,068
- President: Raiko Mutle
- Manager: Rait Oja
- League: Esiliiga B
- 2026: Esiliiga B, 5th of 10
- Website: http://jktulevik.ee
Home colours	Away colours

Viljandi Jalgpalliklubi Tulevik, commonly known as Viljandi Tulevik, or simply as Tulevik, is an Estonian football club based in Viljandi that competes in Esiliiga B, the third tier of Estonian football. The club's home ground is Viljandi linnastaadion.

Founded in 1912 as Sports Association Tulevik (lit. 'Future'), the club was disbanded in 1940 due to the Soviet occupation of Estonia and re-established in 1992 as one of the founding members of the Meistriliiga. The club has competed in the Estonian top division in 1992–1993, 1997–2010, 2015, and most recently from 2017 until 2021.

== History ==
=== Early history (1912–1940) ===
Founded in 1912 as Spordiselts Tulevik (English: Sports Association 'Future'), in part, by Heinrich Aviksoo, they began playing football in 1913 on a field by Lake Viljandi, where Viljandi linnastaadion was built in 1928. Interrupted by World War I and the Estonian War of Independence, Tulevik did not resume playing football until 1927. In 1937, they won the Central division of the regional B klass. Following the Soviet occupation of Estonia in 1940, Tulevik was forced to disband.

In 1977, Viljandi Linnameeskond was formed. The team was promoted to the Soviet Estonian Championship in 1981 and spent the next decade within the top two tiers.

=== Tulevik's revival and prime years (1992–2010) ===
In 1992, after Estonia had regained its independence, Viljandi Linnameeskond was first renamed JK Viljandi, and then JK Tulevik, and became a founding member of the Meistriliiga. After two seasons, the club was relegated to the Esiliiga. In 1997, Tulevik became a part of the Flora system and returned to the Meistriliiga, while Sergei Ratnikov was appointed as manager. In June 1998, Ratnikov was replaced by Tarmo Rüütli.

The club made their European debut in the 1998 UEFA Intertoto Cup, losing to St. Gallen 3–9 on aggregate in the first round. Under Rüütli, Tulevik experienced the most successful period in the club's history, as they reached the 1998–99 Estonian Cup final, losing to Levadia 2–3, and finished the 1999 Meistriliiga season as runners-up, notably surpassing their parent club FC Flora. Tulevik faced Club Brugge in the 1999/00 UEFA qualifying rounds, but lost 0–5 on aggregate. In November 1999, Rüütli left the club to manage Flora and the Estonia national team, and was replaced by his assistant Aivar Lillevere. Tulevik reached the Estonian Cup final again in the following season, but were defeated by Levadia again 0–2. In the following ten years, Tulevik remained a strong mid-table club, but were less and less represented by local Viljandi players, with first team trainings even moved to Tallinn.

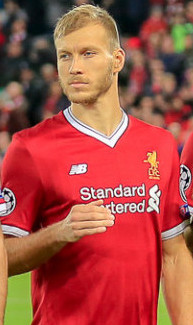
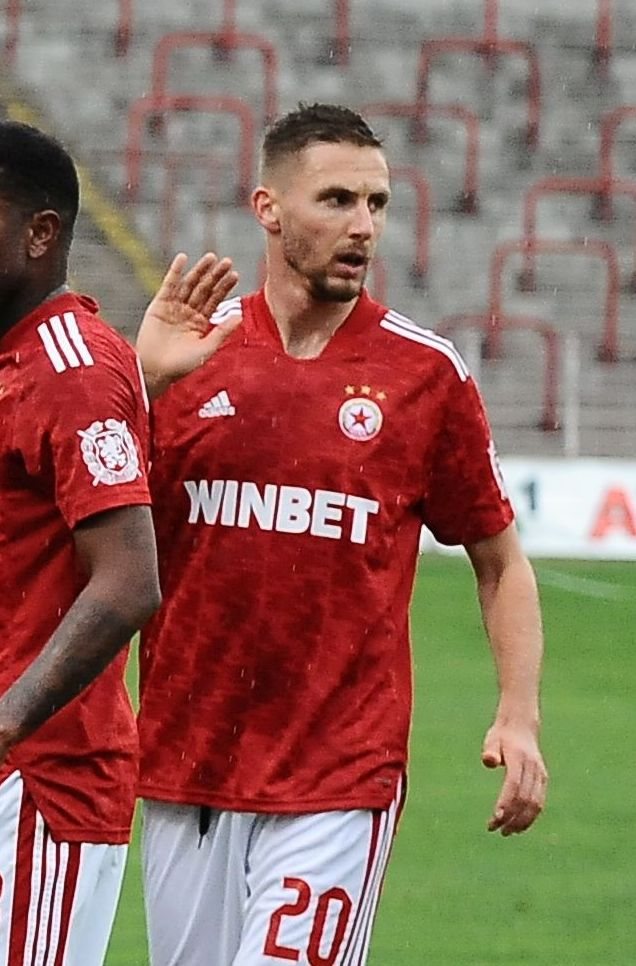
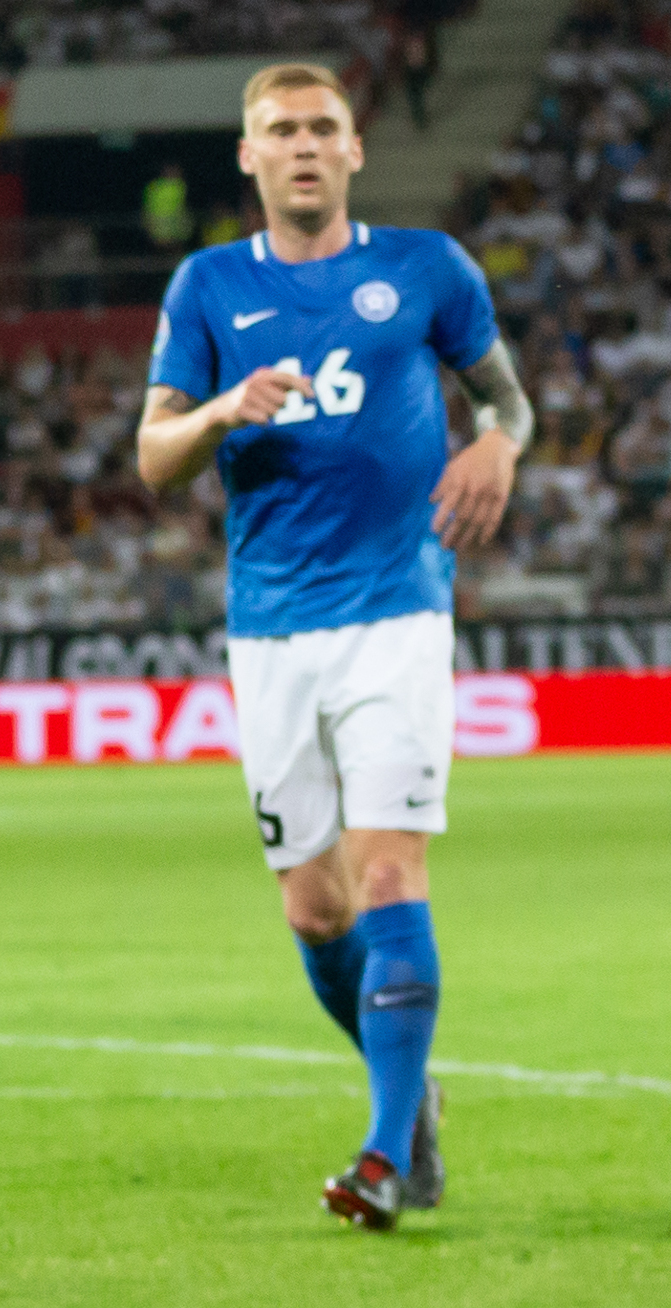
Ex-Liverpool F.C. defender Ragnar Klavan and Estonian centre-back pairing Karol Mets & Joonas Tamm all started their careers at Viljandi Tulevik

=== Recent history (2011–present) ===
In 2011, Tulevik ended their affiliation with Flora. As a result, the newly formed FC Viljandi took their place in the Meistriliiga and Tulevik were relegated to the II liiga. In January 2013, Aivar Lillevere returned to the club as manager. Tulevik finished the 2014 Esiliiga in fifth place and defeated Lokomotiv 1–1 on aggregate on away goal in the promotion play-offs, thus earning promotion to the Meistriliiga. The team's stay in the top division proved short-lived as the club finished the 2015 season in last place and were relegated. Tulevik won the 2016 Esiliiga and were once again promoted to the Meistriliiga. Lillevere resigned in November 2017 and was replaced by Marko Kristal in the following month. In April 2018, Kristal's contract was terminated after disappointing results in the league, with Sander Post taking over as manager.

Under Sander Post, Tulevik established themselves in the Meistriliiga, finishing the 2018 season and 2019 season in 7th place and 2020 season in 6th place. In November 2020, Sander Post announced that he would be stepping down as manager and continue as the sporting director of Tulevik. Jaanus Reitel was announced as his replacement as manager. Viljandi Tulevik finished the 2021 season in 8th place. On 8 December 2021, Tulevik announced they will leave top-flight football due to financial reasons, with club president Raiko Mutle saying the COVID-19 pandemic had made the club's economic situation extraordinarily difficult and Tulevik would now take the time to focus on improving their sustainability and youth system.

In the following 2022 season, Viljandi Tulevik entered Esiliiga, the second of tier of Estonian football. With the team consisting mostly of club's youth players, Tulevik finished the season in 9th place and were relegated. Two years later, they dropped down to fourth tier.

== Crest and colours ==
The traditional club colours of Viljandi Tulevik are yellow, black and blue. The club's crest was modernised in 2024.

1992–2023

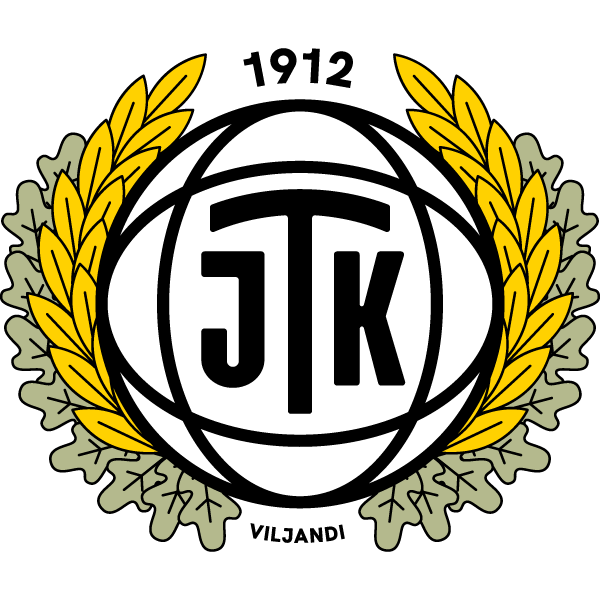
2024–present

== Stadium ==
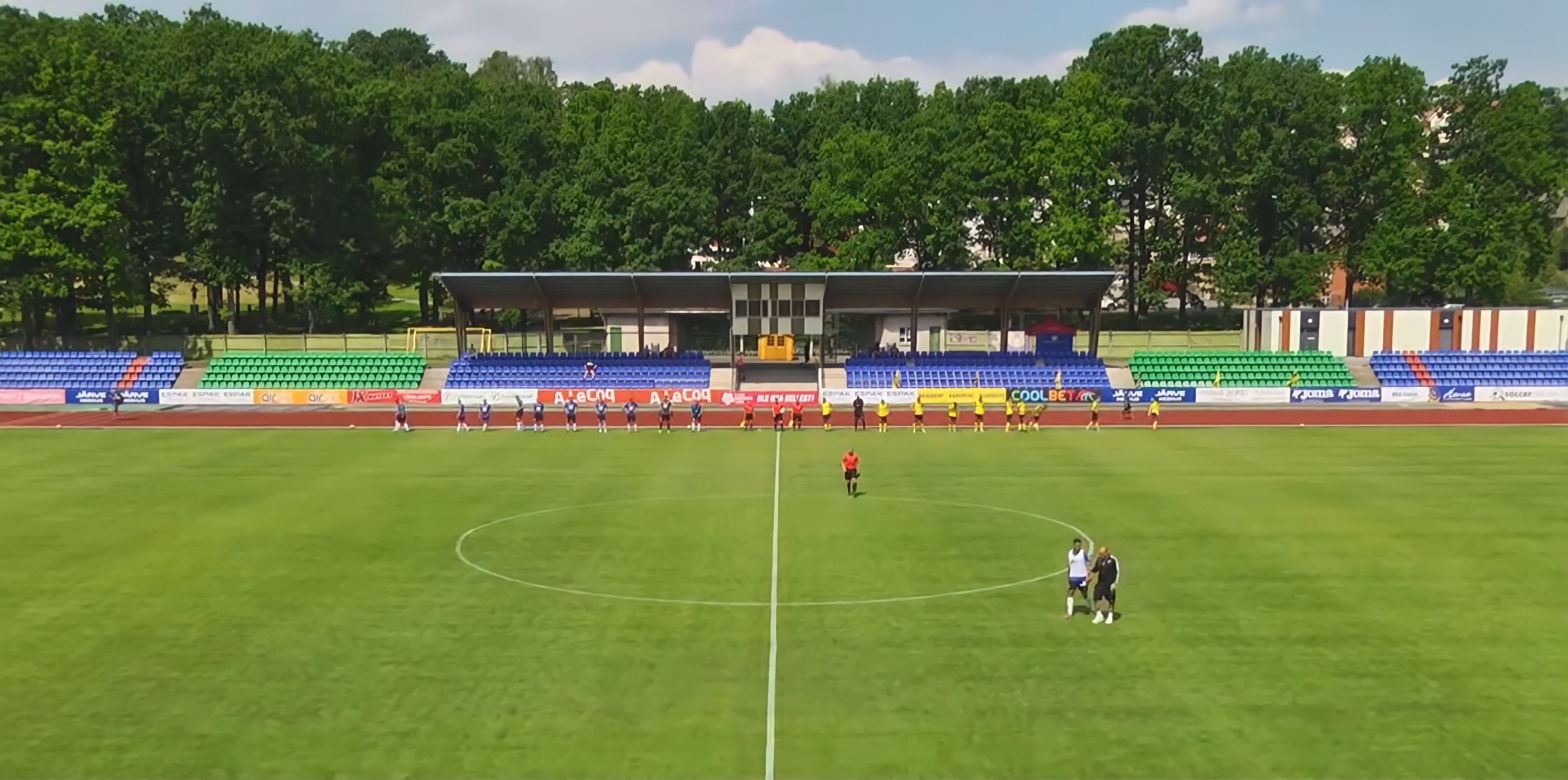
Viljandi linnastaadion

Tulevik initially played on a field by Lake Viljandi, where in 1929, Viljandi linnastaadion was opened. The stadium has been Tulevik's home since its opening until the club's dissolution in 1940 due to Soviet occupation of Estonia, and again since the club's re-establishment in 1992. Renovated in 2008–2009, Viljandi linnastaadion (Viljandi City Stadium) is a multi-purpose stadium with a capacity of 1,068. The stadium is located at Ranna 1, Viljandi.

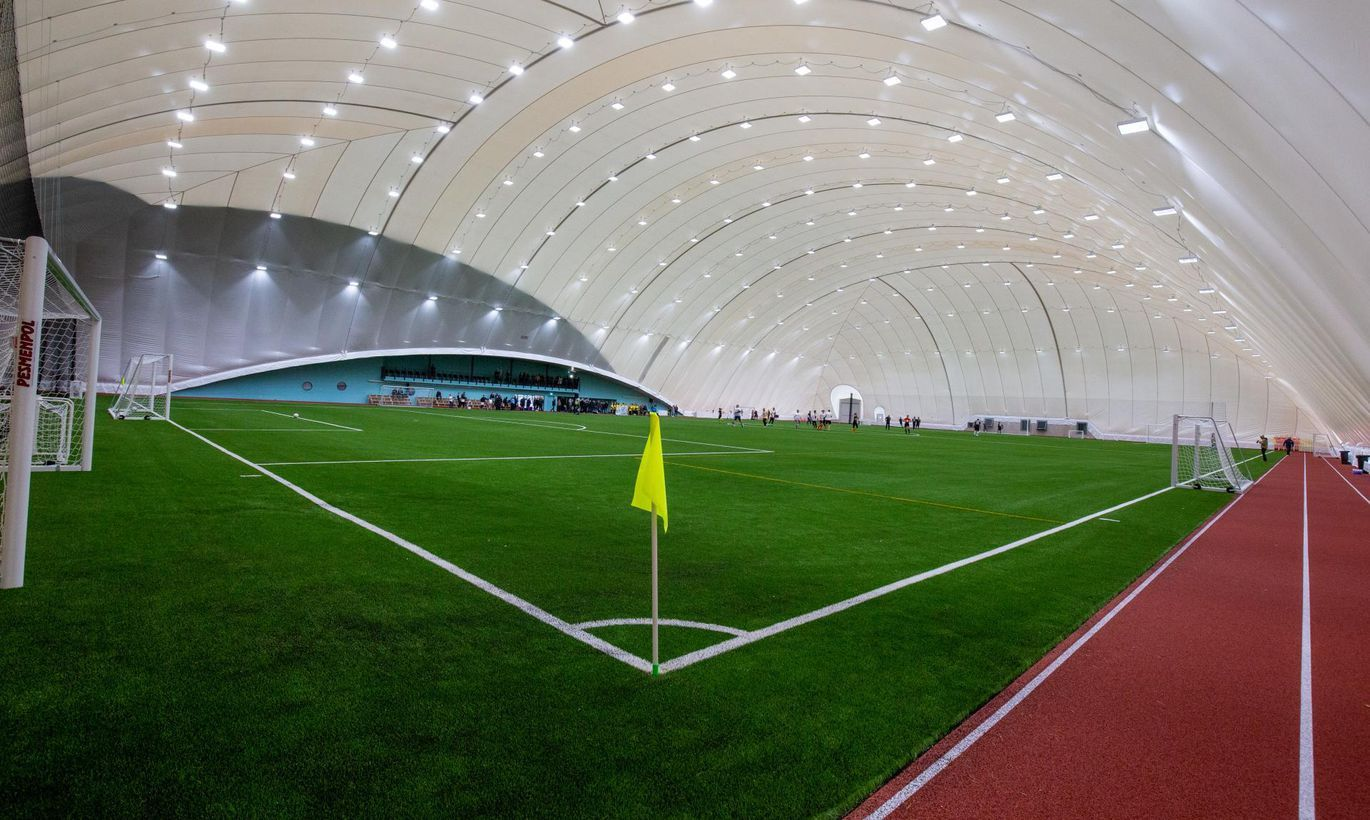
Viljandi Männimäe air dome

In autumn 2021, a state-of-the-art indoor football facility was opened in Viljandi. Costing nearly 3 million euros, the sports complex facilitates footballers during the snowy winter and spring months.

== Players ==
=== Current squad ===
As of 11 January 2023.

Note: Flags indicate national team as defined under FIFA eligibility rules; some limited exceptions apply. Players may hold more than one non-FIFA nationality.

No.	Pos.	Nation	Player
1	GK	EST	Marten Ritson
2	DF	EST	Rome Veske
3	DF	EST	Karl Kurvits
4	DF	EST	Marius Vister
6	FW	ALG	Houd Boukhelkha
10	MF	EST	Edvin Tapfer
11	MF	EST	Riho Domberg
12	GK	EST	Kaupo Kruusmäe
13	MF	EST	Sander Liir
16	MF	EST	Lauri Elur
16	DF	EST	Gustav-Hendrik Seeder
17	FW	EST	Rainer Peips

No.	Pos.	Nation	Player
18	DF	EST	Raimond Mets
19	DF	EST	Karl Kask
21	DF	EST	Kristen Kähr
22	MF	EST	Arlet Hunt
23	MF	EST	Roven Pilv
24	MF	EST	Johannes Metsmaa
28	DF	EST	Kevin Soitu
30	MF	EST	Cevin Suurhallik
72	GK	EST	Karl-Eerik Jürisson
77	MF	EST	Andre Varusk
90	MF	EST	Ingo Ott

== Club officials ==
=== Coaching staff ===
Position	Name
Head coach	(Estonia) Rait Oja
Assistant coach	(Estonia) Kaimar Saag (player-coach)
Goalkeeping coach	(Estonia) Mati Jürisson
Physiotherapist	(Estonia) Helena Pallon

=== Managerial history ===
Dates	Name
1992–?	(Estonia) Leo Ira
1997–1998	(Estonia) Sergei Ratnikov
1998–1999	(Estonia) Tarmo Rüütli
1999–2000	(Estonia) Aivar Lillevere
2000–2002	(Estonia) Tarmo Rüütli
2003–2004	(Estonia) Aivar Lillevere
2005–2010	(Estonia) Marko Lelov
2011–2012	(Estonia) Raiko Mutle
2013–2017	(Estonia) Aivar Lillevere
2018	(Estonia) Marko Kristal
2018–2020	(Estonia) Sander Post
2020–2021	(Estonia) Jaanus Reitel
2021	(Estonia) Sander Post (interim)
2022–2024	(Estonia) Indrek Ilves
2024–	(Estonia) Rait Oja

== Honours ==
=== League ===
- Meistriliiga
  - Runners-up (1): 1999
- Esiliiga
  - Winners (1): 2016
- B klass (Central Division)
  - Winners (1): 1937

=== Cups ===
- Estonian Cup
  - Runners-up (2): 1998–99, 1999–2000
- Estonian Supercup
  - Runners-up (1): 2000

== Seasons and statistics ==
=== Seasons ===
Season	Division	Pos	Pld	W	D	L	GF	GA	GD	Pts	Top goalscorer	Cup	Supercup
1992	Meistriliiga	13	11	1	3	7	17	34	−17	5	(Estonia) Anatoli Logovoi (5)		
1992–93	Meistriliiga	12	22	3	1	18	24	88	−64	7	(Estonia) Sten Kaldma (7)	Quarter-finals	
1993–94	Esiliiga	8	20	8	3	9	44	38	+6	19		Third round	
1994–95	Esiliiga	5	20	15	2	3	60	18	+42	47		Quarter-finals	
1995–96	Esiliiga	6	26	12	1	13	58	51	+7	38		Fourth round	
1996–97	Esiliiga	7	28	9	3	16	32	53	−21	30		Fourth round	
1997–98	Meistriliiga	5	24	8	5	11	32	35	−3	29	(Estonia) Argo Arbeiter (9)	Semi-finals	
1998	Meistriliiga	5	14	5	3	6	15	25	−10	18	(Estonia) Teet Allas (4)		
1999	Meistriliiga	2	28	16	5	7	57	34	+23	53	(Estonia) Dmitri Ustritski (16)	Runners-up	
2000	Meistriliiga	4	28	12	9	7	45	34	+11	45	(Lithuania) Marius Dovydėnas (12)	Runners-up	Runners-up
2001	Meistriliiga	5	28	11	6	11	41	37	+4	39	(Estonia) Dmitri Ustritski (16)	Quarter-finals	
2002	Meistriliiga	5	28	10	6	12	51	52	−1	36	(Estonia) Vjatšeslav Zahovaiko (20)	Quarter-finals	
2003	Meistriliiga	5	28	8	8	14	44	56	−12	30	(Estonia) Enver Jääger (11)	Quarter-finals	
2004	Meistriliiga	6	28	6	7	15	30	53	−23	25	(Estonia) Dmitri Ustritski (11)	Second round	
2005	Meistriliiga	5	36	12	11	13	46	48	−2	47	(Estonia) Dmitri Ustritski (13)	Quarter-finals	
2006	Meistriliiga	9	36	5	5	26	29	74	−45	20	(Estonia) Janek Kalda (7)	Second round	
2007	Meistriliiga	7	36	11	4	21	43	80	−37	37	(Estonia) Aleksander Saharov (Estonia) Mihail Ištšuk (8)	Second round	
2008	Meistriliiga	6	36	9	4	23	31	74	−43	31	(Estonia) Jüri Jevdokimov (Estonia) Markko Kudu (7)	Third round	
2009	Meistriliiga	6	36	15	6	15	55	49	+6	51	(Estonia) Jüri Jevdokimov (14)	Fourth round	
2010	Meistriliiga	7	36	8	5	23	33	62	−29	29	(Estonia) Aleksandr Kulatšenko (8)	Third round	
2011	II liiga	4	28	17	3	6	85	42	+43	54	(Estonia) Rasmus Luhakooder (23)	Third round	
2012	II liiga	2	26	17	5	4	100	32	+68	56	(Estonia) Rasmus Luhakooder (23)	First round	
2013	Esiliiga	8	36	12	10	14	46	57	−11	46	(Estonia) Rasmus Luhakooder (8)	Second round	
2014	Esiliiga	5	36	14	9	13	53	51	+2	51	(Estonia) Rainer Peips (10)	Third round	
2015	Meistriliiga	10	36	6	4	26	35	75	−40	22	(Estonia) Joonas Tamm (9)	First round	
2016	Esiliiga	1	36	28	5	3	106	38	+68	89	(Estonia) Kristen Kähr (22)	Fourth round	
2017	Meistriliiga	8	36	8	4	24	34	95	−61	28	(Estonia) Herol Riiberg (6)	Quarter-finals	
2018	Meistriliiga	7	36	8	5	23	37	100	−63	29	(Estonia) Rainer Peips (8)	Quarter-finals	
2019	Meistriliiga	7	36	7	7	22	35	75	−40	28	(Estonia) Kaimar Saag (13)	First round	
2020	Meistriliiga	6	28	9	4	15	30	46	−16	31	(Estonia) Pavel Marin (11)	Fourth round	
2021	Meistriliiga	8	30	9	3	18	39	62	−23	30	(Estonia) Kaimar Saag (11)	Semi-finals	
2022	Esiliiga	9	36	6	5	25	28	102	−74	23	(Estonia) Edvin Tapfer (5)	Fourth round	
2023	Esiliiga B	6	36	16	7	13	58	55	+3	55	(Estonia) Kristen Kähr (10)	Fourth round	
2024	Esiliiga B	9	36	10	5	21	49	74	−25	35	(Estonia) Kaimar Saag (15)	Third round	

=== Europe ===
Season	Competition	Round	Opponent	Home	Away	Agg.
1998	UEFA Intertoto Cup	First round	(Switzerland) St. Gallen	1–6	2–3	3–9
1999–2000	UEFA Cup	Qualifying round	(Belgium) Club Brugge	0–3	0–2	0–5
2000–01	UEFA Cup	Qualifying round	(Federal Republic of Yugoslavia) Napredak Kruševac	1–1	1–5	2–6
