= Kivisild (surname) =

Family name

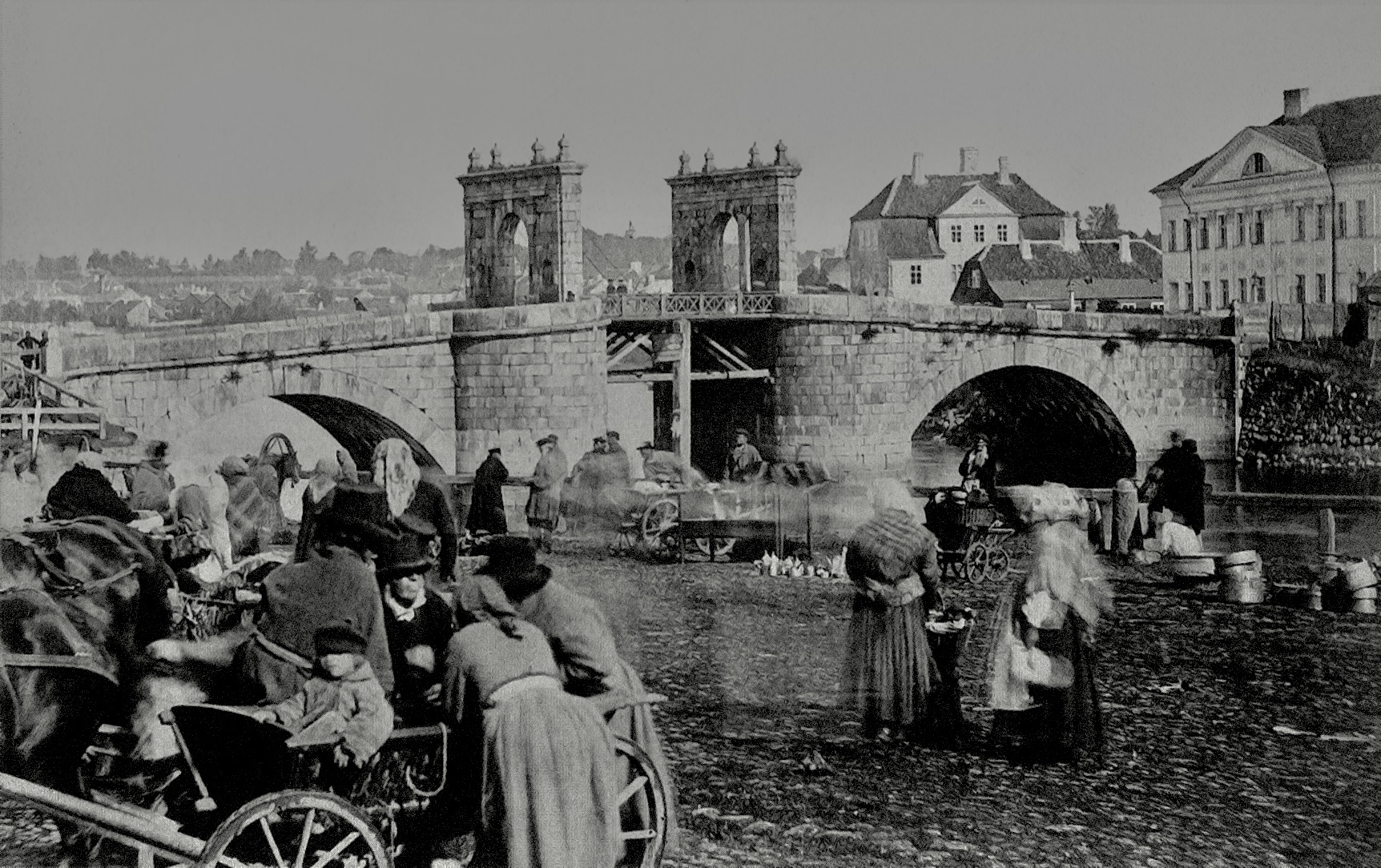
- Tartu kivisild (stone bridge)

Origin
- Language: Estonian
- Meaning: "stone bridge"
- Region of origin: Estonia

Kivisild is an Estonian surname meaning "stone bridge"; a compound of kivi ("stone") and sild ("bridge").

As of 1 January 2023, 133 men and 171 women have the surname Kivisild in Estonia. Kivisild ranks 545th for men and 428th for women in terms of surname distribution in the country. The surname Kivisild is most commonly found in Viljandi County, where 10.74 per 10,000 inhabitants of the county bear the name.

Notabale people with the surname Kivisild include:

- Janno Kivisild (born 1977), football coach
- Meelis Kivisild (born 1990), volleyball player
- Toomas Kivisild (born 1969), population geneticist
