= Norbert Hurt =

Estonian footballer and manager

Personal information
- Full name: Norbert Hurt
- Date of birth: 16 April 1983 (age 43)
- Place of birth: Tartu, then part of Estonian SSR, Soviet Union
- Position: Midfielder

Team information
- Current team: Flora (assistant manager)

Youth career
- Merkuur

Senior career*
Years	Team	Apps	(Gls)
- Merkuur
2004	Elva II		
2005–2006	Tammeka II	18	(10)
2008	Tammeka III	16	(6)
2009–2011	Otepää	31	(29)
2012–2014	HÜJK Emmaste	24	(13)

Managerial career
- 2008: Maag Tammeka II
- 2009: Tammeka
- 2011–2013: Flora II
- 2013–2016: Flora
- 2017–: Flora (assistant)
- * Club domestic league appearances and goals

Norbert Hurt (born 16 April 1983) is an Estonian football coach. He is currently an assistant manager of Flora.

== Playing career ==
Hurt started playing football with the Merkuur in Tartu and continued with the Tammeka Football Academy. In 2012, he joined II liiga club HÜJK Emmaste. In the following year, Emmaste was promoted to the newly established Esiliiga B division. Hurt left Emmaste in 2014 to pursue his coaching career.

== Managerial career ==
In 2009, Tammeka hired Hurt as manager for the 2009 season. Since 2011, Hurt coached Flora's reserve team Flora II. On 20 July 2013, he replaced the sacked Flora manager Marko Lelov as caretaker manager, with position being made permanent later. Flora finished the 2013 season in fourth place and placed third in 2014.

In 2015, as Flora celebrated their 25th anniversary as a club, Hurt coached the team to their 10th Meistriliiga trophy, securing the league title in the 34th round of the season.

On 8 July 2016, Hurt resigned after Flora failed to advance past the first qualifying round of the 2016–17 UEFA Champions League, losing to Lincoln Red Imps 2–3 on aggregate.

In February 2018, he became the head coach of Estonia U16 national team.

== Honours ==
=== Managerial ===
Flora

- Meistriliiga: 2015
- Estonian Supercup: 2014, 2016

Individual

- Meistriliiga Manager of the Month: May 2014, March 2015, October 2015, May 2024
