= Sergei Terehhov =

Estonian footballer and coach

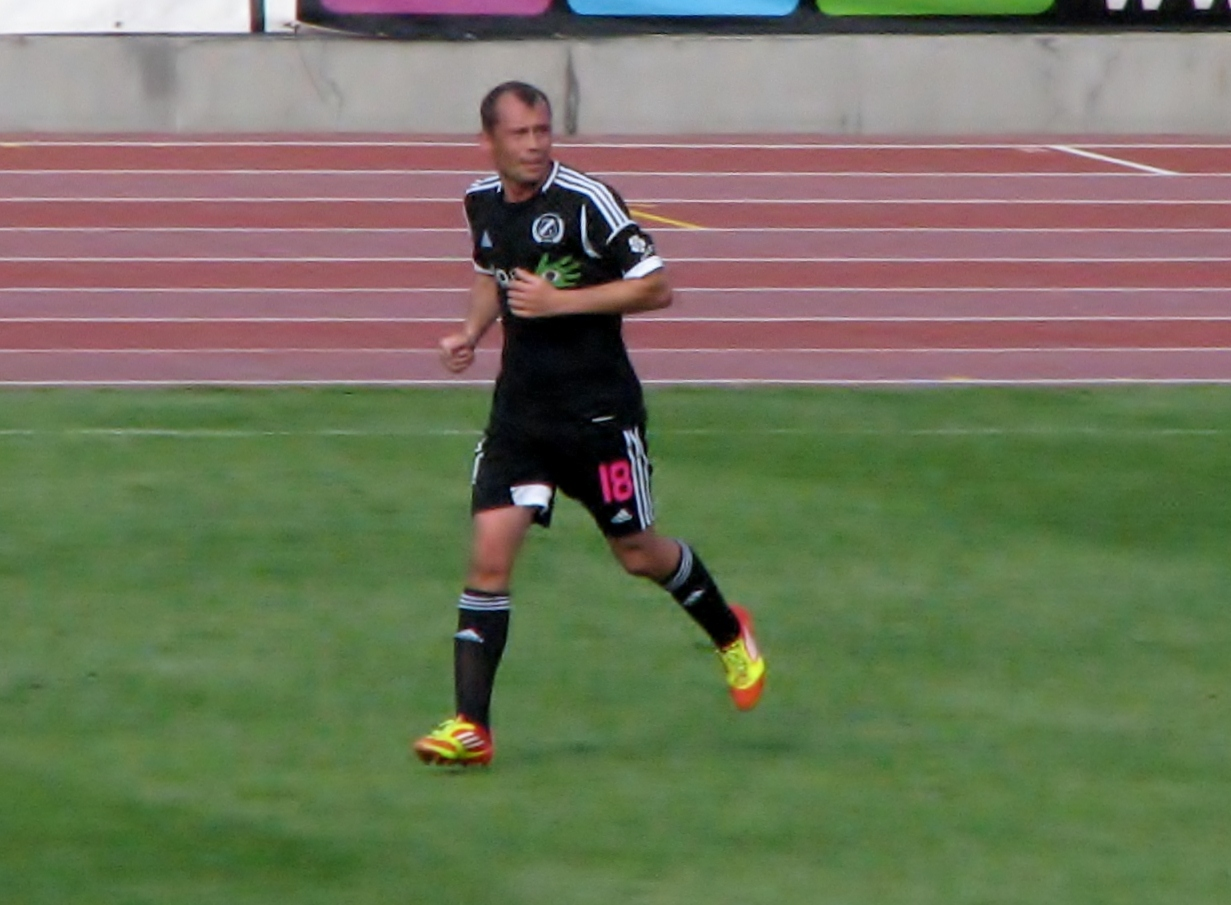

Personal information
- Date of birth: 18 April 1975 (age 51)
- Place of birth: Pärnu, then part of Estonian SSR, Soviet Union
- Height: 1.71 m (5 ft 7 1/2 in)
- Positions: Winger; midfielder

Senior career*
Years	Team	Apps	(Gls)
1993–1994	Tervis Pärnu	2	(0)
1994–1995	Pärnu Kalev	13	(3)
1995–1996	Tallinna Sadam	44	(11)
1997–1999	Flora	50	(12)
2000–2002	Brann	22	(1)
2002–2004	Haka	60	(10)
2005–2006	Shinnik Yaroslavl	10	(0)
2006	Honka	6	(1)
2007–2008	TVMK	55	(18)
2009–2013	Nõmme Kalju	136	(7)

International career
1997–2007	Estonia	94	(5)

Managerial career
- 2014–2015: Nõmme Kalju
- 2015–2020: Nõmme Kalju (assistant)
- 2021–2022: TJK Legion (assistant)
- 2023: Narva Trans
- * Club domestic league appearances and goals

Sergei Terehhov (born 18 April 1975) is an Estonian football coach and former professional player.

== Club career ==
His former clubs include Tervis Pärnu, Pärnu Kalev, Tallinna Sadam, Flora Tallinn, Brann, Haka, Shinnik Yaroslavl, Honka, TVMK Tallinn and Nõmme Kalju.

== International career ==
Terehhov was a long-time Estonia national football team player with 94 caps to his name. He scored the equaliser when Estonia played 1–1 against Russia in World Cup 2006 qualifications.

== Managerial career ==
Terehhov was officially appointed as a manager at his former club Nõmme Kalju on 10 December 2014.

From 2023, Terehhov is the head coach of Narva Trans.

== Honours ==
Nõmme Kalju

- Estonian Cup runner-up: 2008–09
- Meistriliiga: 2012

Haka

- Finnish Cup: 2002
- Veikkausliiga: 2004

Individual

- Estonian Silverball: 1998
- Meistriliiga Manager of the Month: August 2012, April 2015, July 2015
