= 2015 Meistriliiga =

Estonian national championships in football

Meistriliiga
- Season: 2015
- Champions: Flora; 10th title
- Relegated: Tulevik
- Champions League: Flora
- Europa League: Levadia; Nõmme Kalju; Infonet
- Matches: 180
- Goals: 544 (3.02 per match)
- Top goalscorer: Ingemar Teever (24 goals)
- Biggest home win: Flora 7–0 Tammeka (26 May 2015)
- Biggest away win: Pärnu Linnameeskond 1–6 Sillamäe Kalev (10 April 2015); Tammeka 0–5 Sillamäe Kalev (8 May 2015); Pärnu Linnameeskond 0–5 Levadia (1 August 2015); Tammeka 1–6 Levadia (18 August 2015)
- Highest scoring: Paide Linnameeskond 5–4 Nõmme Kalju (14 August 2015)

The 2015 Meistriliiga, also known as A. Le Coq Premium Liiga for sponsorship reasons, was the 25th season of the Meistriliiga, the first level in the Estonian football system. The season started on 6 March 2015 and the final matchday took place on 7 November. Levadia, the defending champions, finished runner-up behind Flora, who won their tenth title.

== Teams ==
A total of ten teams will contest the league, including 8 sides from the 2014 season and two promoted teams from the 2014 Esiliiga. Tallinna Kalev were relegated from the Meistriliiga after three seasons and were replaced by Pärnu Linnameeskond, the best of independent teams in 2014 Esiliiga, Pärnu made their comeback to top flight after 6 seasons on lower levels. Lokomotiv were relegated after a single season, they were defeated in the relegation play-offs by Tulevik returning to Meistriliiga after four-year absence.

=== Stadiums and locations ===
Location of the 2015 Meistriliiga teams

Team	Location	Stadium	Capacity
Flora	Tallinn	A. Le Coq Arena	9,692
Infonet	Tallinn	Sportland Arena	540
Levadia	Tallinn	Kadriorg Stadium	5,000
Narva Trans	Narva	Kreenholm Stadium	1,065
Nõmme Kalju	Tallinn	Hiiu Stadium	300
Paide Linnameeskond	Paide	Paide linnastaadion	268
Pärnu Linnameeskond	Pärnu	Pärnu Raeküla Stadium	550
Sillamäe Kalev	Sillamäe	Sillamäe Kalev Stadium	800
Tammeka	Tartu	Tartu Tamme Stadium	1,750
Tulevik	Viljandi	Viljandi linnastaadion	1,068

=== Personnel and kits ===
Note: Flags indicate national team as has been defined under FIFA eligibility rules. Players and Managers may hold more than one non-FIFA nationality.

Team	Manager	Captain	Kit manufacturer	Shirt sponsor
Flora	(Estonia) Norbert Hurt	(Estonia) Gert Kams	Nike	Tele2
Infonet	(Estonia) Aleksandr Puštov	(Estonia) Andrei Kalimullin	Joma	Infonet
Levadia	(Estonia) Marko Kristal	(Estonia) Ingemar Teever	Adidas	Viimsi Keevitus
Narva Trans	(Russia) Adyam Kuzyaev	(Estonia) Roman Nesterovski	Nike	Fama
Nõmme Kalju	(Brazil) Getúlio Fredo	(Estonia) Vitali Teleš	Adidas	Optibet
Paide Linnameeskond	(Estonia) Meelis Rooba	(Estonia) Andre Mägi	Nike	Verston
Pärnu Linnameeskond	(Estonia) Marko Lelov	(Estonia) Karl Palatu	Nike	Wendre
Sillamäe Kalev	(Russia) Denis Ugarov	(Estonia) Andrei Sidorenkov	Uhlsport	Alexela
Tammeka	(Estonia) Indrek Koser	(Estonia) Jürgen Lorenz	Nike	Goldtime
Tulevik	(Estonia) Aivar Lillevere	(Estonia) Sander Post	Joma	Bestra

=== Managerial changes ===
Team	Outgoing manager	Manner of departure	Date of vacancy	Position in table	Replaced by	Date of appointment
Nõmme Kalju	(Estonia) Igor Prins	Sacked	2 December 2014	Pre-season	(Estonia) Sergei Terehhov	10 December 2014
Pärnu Linnameeskond	(Estonia) Gert Olesk	Mutual consent	22 December 2014	Pre-season	(Estonia) Marko Lelov	22 December 2014
Narva Trans	(Russia) Aleksei Yagudin	Mutual consent	20 May 2015	7th	(Estonia) Nikolai Toštšev (caretaker)	20 May 2015
Sillamäe Kalev	(Russia) Sergei Frantsev	Sacked	29 May 2015	4th	(Russia) Denis Ugarov	29 May 2015
Narva Trans	(Estonia) Nikolai Toštšev	Caretaker spell over	6 July 2015	6th	(Russia) Adyam Kuzyaev	6 July 2015
Nõmme Kalju	(Estonia) Sergei Terehhov	Resigned	12 September 2015	3rd	(Brazil) Getúlio Fredo (caretaker)	12 September 2015

=== Player transfers ===
- Transfers made during the 2014–15 winter transfer window.
- Transfers made during the 2015 summer transfer window.

== League table ==
Pos	Team	Pld	W	D	L	GF	GA	GD	Pts	Qualification or relegation
1	Flora (C)	36	27	3	6	72	24	+48	84	Qualification for the Champions League first qualifying round
2	Levadia	36	22	10	4	78	32	+46	76	Qualification for the Europa League first qualifying round
3	Nõmme Kalju	36	22	5	9	69	36	+33	71	Qualification for the Europa League first qualifying round
4	Infonet	36	17	11	8	50	32	+18	62	Qualification for the Europa League first qualifying round
5	Sillamäe Kalev	36	17	8	11	63	43	+20	59	
6	Narva Trans	36	14	7	15	50	46	+4	49	
7	Paide Linnameeskond	36	9	6	21	50	73	−23	33	
8	Pärnu Linnameeskond	36	6	8	22	38	87	−49	26	
9	Tammeka (O)	36	7	4	25	39	96	−57	25	Qualification for the relegation play-offs
10	Tulevik (R)	36	6	4	26	35	75	−40	22	Relegation to the Esiliiga

Source: Estonian Football Association (in Estonian), UEFA, Soccerway
Rules for classification: 1) Points; 2) Play-off (only if deciding champion); 3) Less matches awarded against; 4) Matches won; 5) Head-to-head points; 6) Head-to-head goal difference; 7) Goal difference; 8) Goals scored; 9) Away goals scored; 10) Fairplay ranking.
(C) Champions; (O) Play-off winners; (R) Relegated

=== Relegation play-offs ===
At season's end Tammeka, the ninth place club, participated in a two-legged play-off with Tallinna Kalev, the runners-up (of the independent teams) of the 2015 Esiliiga, for the spot in next year's competition.

18 November 2015
19:00 (UTC+2)

Tammeka	4–1	Tallinna Kalev
Kiidron 55'; Tiirik 59'; Hurt 64'; Paju 89'	Report	Larin 54'

Annelinna artificial turf, Tartu
Attendance: 151
Referee: Kristo Tohver
21 November 2015
13:00 (UTC+2)

Tallinna Kalev	1–0	Tammeka
Wahl 50'	Report

Kalev Keskstaadion artificial turf, Tallinn
Attendance: 54
Referee: Eiko Saar

Tammeka won 4–2 on aggregate and retained their Meistriliiga spot for the 2016 season.

== Results ==
Each team plays every opponent four times, twice at home and twice away, for a total of 36 games.

=== First half of season ===
Home \ Away	FLO	INF	LEV	NAR	NÕM	PAI	PÄR	SIL	TAM	TUL
Flora		1–0	0–1	0–1	0–2	2–1	3–1	1–0	7–0	3–0
Infonet	0–2		1–2	3–0	1–0	2–3	2–0	1–0	2–2	2–0
Levadia	1–1	0–0		1–1	0–2	2–1	3–0	2–0	2–1	2–0
Narva Trans	0–1	0–0	1–3		2–0	0–0	5–2	1–2	6–0	2–0
Nõmme Kalju	2–0	1–0	1–2	4–1		2–1	1–0	0–2	3–0	6–2
Paide	0–2	2–4	1–5	1–0	0–3		4–1	1–1	2–3	0–3
Pärnu	1–2	0–2	2–2	0–1	0–3	2–2		1–6	4–2	2–1
Sillamäe Kalev	1–2	0–0	3–3	1–0	2–3	4–1	0–0		4–0	2–1
Tammeka	1–3	1–2	2–3	3–1	1–2	3–2	1–0	0–5		1–1
Tulevik	0–4	0–0	0–4	1–1	1–0	2–0	5–2	0–2	3–1	

Source: Estonian Football Association
Legend: Blue = home team win; Yellow = draw; Red = away team win.

=== Second half of season ===
Home \ Away	FLO	INF	LEV	NAR	NÕM	PAI	PÄR	SIL	TAM	TUL
Flora		0–0	1–1	2–3	1–0	1–0	4–0	3–1	2–1	4–1
Infonet	0–1		2–2	3–0	2–2	1–0	1–1	3–1	4–2	2–1
Levadia	0–2	5–0		0–1	1–2	5–1	0–0	2–1	1–0	2–0
Narva Trans	1–3	0–1	0–1		0–2	2–0	5–0	0–0	4–2	2–0
Nõmme Kalju	0–2	1–1	0–0	1–1		1–0	4–3	2–1	1–0	4–0
Paide	2–1	0–2	2–4	1–2	5–4		3–3	1–1	4–0	4–1
Pärnu	1–5	0–4	0–5	2–2	2–1	0–1		1–2	0–1	1–0
Sillamäe Kalev	0–1	1–0	2–2	2–0	0–4	1–0	3–3		4–1	2–1
Tammeka	1–4	1–1	1–6	2–1	0–2	1–1	0–1	1–4		1–0
Tulevik	0–1	0–1	0–3	2–3	2–2	2–3	1–2	1–2	3–2	

Source: Estonian Football Association
Legend: Blue = home team win; Yellow = draw; Red = away team win.

== Season statistics ==
=== Top scorers ===
Rank	Player	Club	Goals
1	(Estonia) Ingemar Teever	Levadia	24
2	(Ukraine) Yaroslav Kvasov	Sillamäe Kalev	19
3	(Estonia) Vjatšeslav Zahovaiko	Paide Linnameeskond	17
4	(Estonia) Ats Purje	Nõmme Kalju	16
4	(Estonia) Rauno Sappinen	Flora	16
6	(Latvia) Vitālijs Ziļs	Narva Trans	13
7	(Latvia) Vladislavs Kozlovs	Infonet	12
8	(Estonia) Taavi Laurits	Pärnu Linnameeskond	11
8	(Estonia) Siim Luts	Levadia	11
8	(Estonia) Tarmo Neemelo	Nõmme Kalju	11
8	(Japan) Hidetoshi Wakui	Nõmme Kalju	11

=== Hat-tricks ===
Player	For	Against	Result	Date
(Estonia) Taavi Laurits	Pärnu Linnameeskond	Tammeka	4–2 (H)	14 March 2015
(Ukraine) Yaroslav Kvasov	Sillamäe Kalev	Pärnu Linnameeskond	6–1 (A)	10 April 2015
(Estonia) Joonas Tamm	Tulevik	Paide Linnameeskond	3–0 (A)	2 May 2015
(Ukraine) Yaroslav Kvasov	Sillamäe Kalev	Tammeka	5–0 (A)	8 May 2015
(Latvia) Vitālijs Ziļs	Narva Trans	Tammeka	6–0 (H)	2 June 2015
(Estonia) Kaimar Saag	Levadia	Narva Trans	3–1 (A)	4 July 2015
(Estonia) Ats Purje	Nõmme Kalju	Tulevik	4–0 (H)	20 July 2015
(Latvia) Vladislavs Kozlovs^{4}	Infonet	Tammeka	4–2 (H)	18 August 2015
(Estonia) Ingemar Teever	Levadia	Paide Linnameeskond	4–2 (A)	28 August 2015
(Estonia) Vjatšeslav Zahovaiko	Paide Linnameeskond	Tammeka	4–0 (H)	18 October 2015
(Estonia) Vjatšeslav Zahovaiko	Paide Linnameeskond	Tulevik	3–2 (A)	24 October 2015

Notes

^{4} Player scored 4 goals
(H) – Home team
(A) – Away team

=== Average attendance ===
Club	Average attendance
Tallinna FC Flora	633
Nõmme JK Kalju	485
Tartu JK Tammeka	424
Pärnu Linnameeskond	352
Viljandi JK Tulevik	295
Tallinna FC Levadia	253
JK Sillamäe Kalev	228
Tallinna FC Infonet	212
JK Narva Trans	189
Paide Linnameeskond	181
League average	325

== Awards ==
=== Monthly awards ===
Month	Manager of the Month		Player of the Month	
Month	Manager	Club	Player	Club
March	(Estonia) Norbert Hurt	Flora	(Estonia) Ken Kallaste	Nõmme Kalju
April	(Estonia) Sergei Terehhov	Nõmme Kalju	(Estonia) Vjatšeslav Zahovaiko	Paide Linnameeskond
May	(Estonia) Aivar Lillevere	Tulevik	(Estonia) Ingemar Teever	Levadia
June	(Estonia) Marko Kristal	Levadia	(Russia) Yevgeni Kharin	Infonet
July	(Estonia) Sergei Terehhov	Nõmme Kalju	(Estonia) Siim Luts	Levadia
August	(Estonia) Marko Kristal	Levadia	(Estonia) Ingemar Teever	Levadia
September	(Russia) Adyam Kuzyaev	Narva Trans	(Estonia) Siim Luts	Levadia
October	(Estonia) Norbert Hurt	Flora	(Estonia) Rauno Sappinen	Flora

=== Annual awards ===
==== Player of the Season ====
Ingemar Teever was named Player of the Season.

==== Goal of the Season ====
Raido Roman's goal against Tammeka was chosen Goal of the Season.

== See also ==
- 2014–15 Estonian Cup
- 2015–16 Estonian Cup
- 2015 Esiliiga
- 2015 Esiliiga B
