= 1999–2000 Estonian Cup =

Eesti Karikas

Tournament details
- Country: Estonia
- Teams: 31

Final positions
- Champions: Levadia Maardu
- Runners-up: Tulevik

Tournament statistics
- Matches played: 35
- Goals scored: 138 (3.94 per match)

The 1999–2000 Estonian Cup (Estonian: Eesti Karikas) was the tenth season of the Estonian football knockout tournament. Originally, winners of the cup qualified for the 2000–01 UEFA Cup qualifying round. The defending champion, Levadia Maardu, was successfully defend the title, after winning the final 2–0, which was held at Pärnu Kalevi staadion, Pärnu on 28 May 2000. Since the Levadia Maardu also win the 1999 Meistriliiga, the UEFA Cup places were moved to second and third positioned team in the league.

All in all, 31 teams took part of the competition.

== First round ==
| Team 1 | Score | Team 2 |
|---|---|---|
| Atli | 2–2 (a.e.t.) (5–6 p) | Štrommi |
| Concordia Tallinn | 3–1 | Flora Kehtna |
| Old Stars | 0–3 | Junior Maardu |
| TTÜ | 0–1 | Tapa |
| Toompea | 0–3 | Järve |
| Tempori Kehra | 3–1 | Rada/HKL |
| Trummi | 3–4 (a.e.t.) | Irbis |
| Lemons | w/o | Tartu |

== Second round ==
| Team 1 | Score | Team 2 |
|---|---|---|
| Concordia Tallinn | 0–4 | FC Maardu |
| Tapa | 2–5 | Kuressaare |
| Irbis | 2–2 (a.e.t.) (3–1 p) | Merkuur |
| Junior Maardu | 1–1 (a.e.t.) (5–6 p) | M.C. Tallinn |
| Tempori Kehra | 0–3 | Valga |
| Štrommi | 4–0 | FC Lelle |
| Lemons | 0–5 | Vigri |
| Järve | 0–4 | Lootus |

== Third round ==
| Team 1 | Score | Team 2 |
|---|---|---|
| Štrommi | 1–0 | Narva Trans |
| Valga^{1} | 1–5 | TVMK |
| M.C. Tallinn | 2–6 | Lootus |
| FC Maardu | 0–1 (a.e.t.) | Lantana^{1} |
| Kuressaare | 2–4 | Levadia Maardu |
| Irbis | 1–7 | Tulevik |
| Vigri | 0–1 | Lelle SK^{2} |
| Flora | | Bye |

Notes

- ^{1} Lantana were withdraw from the competition during the winter break and were replaced by Valga.
- ^{2} Lelle SK were renamed to Tervis Pärnu during the winter break.

== Quarter-finals ==
| Team 1 | Agg. | Team 2 | 1st leg | 2nd leg |
|---|---|---|---|---|
| Štrommi | 0–15 | Levadia Maardu | 0–6 | 0–9 |
| Flora | 6–0 | Valga | 2–0 | 4–0 |
| Tulevik | 3–2 | Lootus | 2–1 | 1–1 |
| Tervis Pärnu | 1–9 | TVMK | 0–7 | 1–2 |

== Semi-finals ==
| Team 1 | Agg. | Team 2 | 1st leg | 2nd leg |
|---|---|---|---|---|
| Tulevik | 2–1 | Flora | 2–0 | 0–1 |
| TVMK | 1–6 | Levadia Maardu | 1–3 | 0–3 |

== Final ==
| 28 May 2000 | Levadia Maardu | 2–0 | Tulevik | Pärnu |
| | Olumets 65'; Leetma 76' | | | Stadium: Pärnu Kalevi staadion Attendance: 500; Referee: Sten Kaldma |
