= Tarmo Rüütli =

Estonian manager and footballer

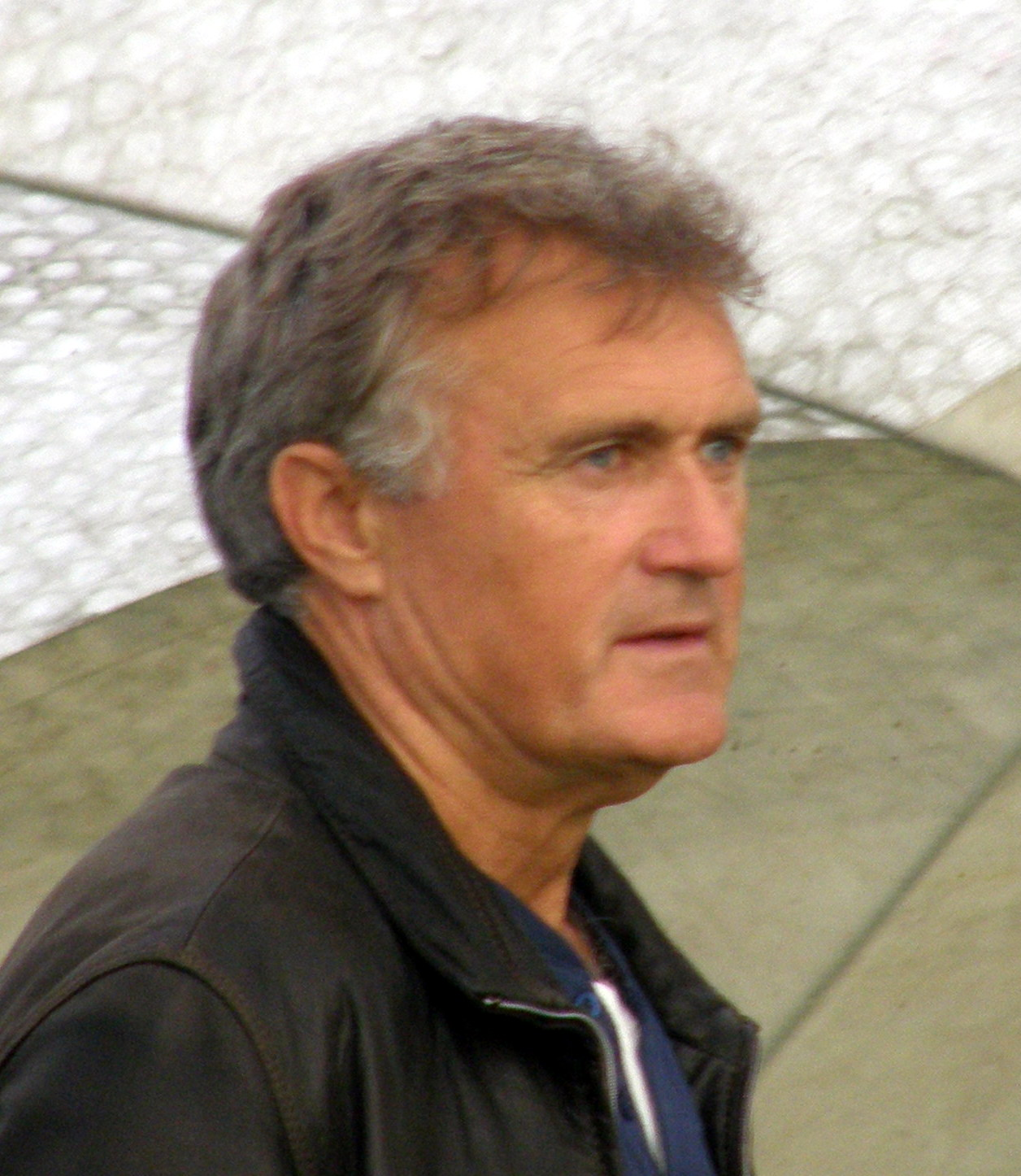
- Rüütli in 2012

Personal information
- Full name: Tarmo Rüütli
- Date of birth: 11 August 1954 (age 72)
- Place of birth: Viljandi, then part of Estonian SSR, Soviet Union
- Position: Midfielder

Senior career*
Years	Team	Apps	(Gls)
1971–1975	Norma	15	(1)
1975–1977	Pärnu Kalev	50	(9)
1978–1984	Pärnu Kalakombinaat	144	(30)
1985–1991	Pärnu Kalakombinaat/MEK	129	(27)
1992–1994	Tervis Pärnu	14	(2)
2003	JK Tallinna Kalev		
2004–2005	JK Tallinna Kalev U21		
2006–2008	Tallinna FC Soccernet		
2009–2017	JK Retro		

Managerial career
- 1990: Pärnu Kalakombinaat
- 1991–1997: Flora (assistant)
- 1997–1999: Tulevik
- 1998–2000: Estonia U21
- 1999–2000: Estonia
- 2000: Flora
- 2001–2002: Tulevik
- 2003–2008: Levadia
- 2008–2013: Estonia
- 2009: Flora
- 2010–2012: Nõmme United
- 2014: Tallinna Kalev
- 2014: Estonia U18
- 2014: Irtysh Pavlodar
- * Club domestic league appearances and goals

Tarmo Rüütli (born 11 August 1954) is an Estonian football manager and former football player.

As player, Rüütli won the 1985 Estonian Championship with Pärnu Kalakombinaat/MEK. As manager, he led Levadia to three Meistriliiga titles and three Estonian Cups, and Flora to one Estonian Cup and one Estonian Supercup. Rüütli has served as the manager of the Estonia national team twice, from 1999 to 2000 and from 2008 to 2013. He led the team to their highest ever FIFA ranking of 47th in 2012, and came close to qualifying for a major tournament for the first time in Estonia's history, reaching the UEFA Euro 2012 qualifying play-offs.

== Honours ==
=== Player ===
Pärnu Kalakombinaat/MEK

- Estonian Championship: 1985

=== Manager ===
Levadia

- Meistriliiga: 2004, 2006, 2007
- Estonian Cup: 2003–04, 2004–05, 2006–07

Flora

- Estonian Cup: 2008–09
- Estonian Supercup: 2009

Individual

- Estonian Coach of the Year: 2011
- Order of the White Star, 4th Class
