= 1992–93 Estonian Cup =

Estonian football competition

Eesti Karikas

Tournament details
- Country: Estonia
- Teams: 26

Final positions
- Champions: Nikol
- Runners-up: Norma

Tournament statistics
- Matches played: 22
- Goals scored: 106 (4.82 per match)

The 1992–93 Estonian Cup (Estonian: Eesti Karikas) was the third season of the Estonian football knockout tournament. Since the Baltic nation had gained independence from the Soviet Union in 1991, the competition was held after the 54 year pause. Winners of the cup qualified for the 1993–94 European Cup Winners' Cup qualifying round.

The competition culminated with the final held at Kadriorg Stadium, Tallinn on 9 June 1993 with Nikol taking the title after the penalty shoot-out 4–2 after the game was finished after extra-time 0–0.

All in all, 26 teams took part of the competition.

== First round ==
| Team 1 | Score | Team 2 |
|---|---|---|
| Sindi Tekstiil | w/o | Flora |
| Tulevik | w/o | SS Kalev Tartu |
| Valga Lokomotiiv | 2–2 (a.e.t.) (3–5 p) | Pärnu JK |
| Maardu FK | 0–9 | Eesti Põlevkivi Jõhvi |
| Järvamaa | 2–1 | Merkuur |
| Valga Fööniks-Sport | 1–4 | Keemik |
| Tallinna Sadam | 1–2 | Sillamäe Kalev |
| Kiviõli | 2–10 | Norma |
| Tervis Pärnu | 2–0 | Dünamo |
| Tallinna FC Tempo | w/o | Narva Trans |

== Second round ==
| Team 1 | Score | Team 2 |
|---|---|---|
| Narva Kreenholm | 2–6 | Nikol |
| Peipsi Kalur | w/o | Flora |
| Tulevik | 1–0 | Pärnu JK |
| Eesti Põlevkivi Jõhvi | w/o | Järvamaa |
| Keemik | 6–1 | Sillamäe Kalev |
| Norma | w/o | Tervis Pärnu |
| Narva Trans | 1–2 | Vigri |
| Pena Jõhvi | w/o | Tallinna Metallist |

== Bracket ==
Quarterfinals
Nikol | – | – | 1
Flora | – | – | 0
Tulevik | – | – | 3
EP Jõhvi | – | – | 5
Keemik | – | – | 0
Norma (aet) | – | – | 3
Vigri | – | – | 1
Pena Jõhvi | – | – | 0

Semifinals
Nikol | 1 | 1 | 2
EP Jõhvi | 1 | 0 | 1
Norma | 2 | 2 | 4
Vigri | 0 | 0 | 0

Finals
Nikol (p) | – | – | 0 (4)
Norma | – | – | 0 (2)

== Quarter-finals ==
| Team 1 | Score | Team 2 |
|---|---|---|
| Nikol | 1–0 | Flora |
| Tulevik | 3–5 | Eesti Põlevkivi Jõhvi |
| Keemik | 0–3 (a.e.t.) | Norma |
| Vigri | 1–0 | Pena Jõhvi |

== Semi-finals ==
| Team 1 | Agg. | Team 2 | 1st leg | 2nd leg |
|---|---|---|---|---|
| Nikol | 2–1 | Eesti Põlevkivi Jõhvi | 1–0 | 1–1 |
| Norma | 4–0 | Vigri | 2–0 | 2–0 |

== Final ==
9 June 1993

| Nikol | 0–0 (a.e.t.) | Norma |
Penalties
| | 4–2 |

Kadrioru staadion, Tallinn
Attendance: 350
Referee: Ants Nõmmiste
