= Roman Ubakivi =

Estonian footballer and coach

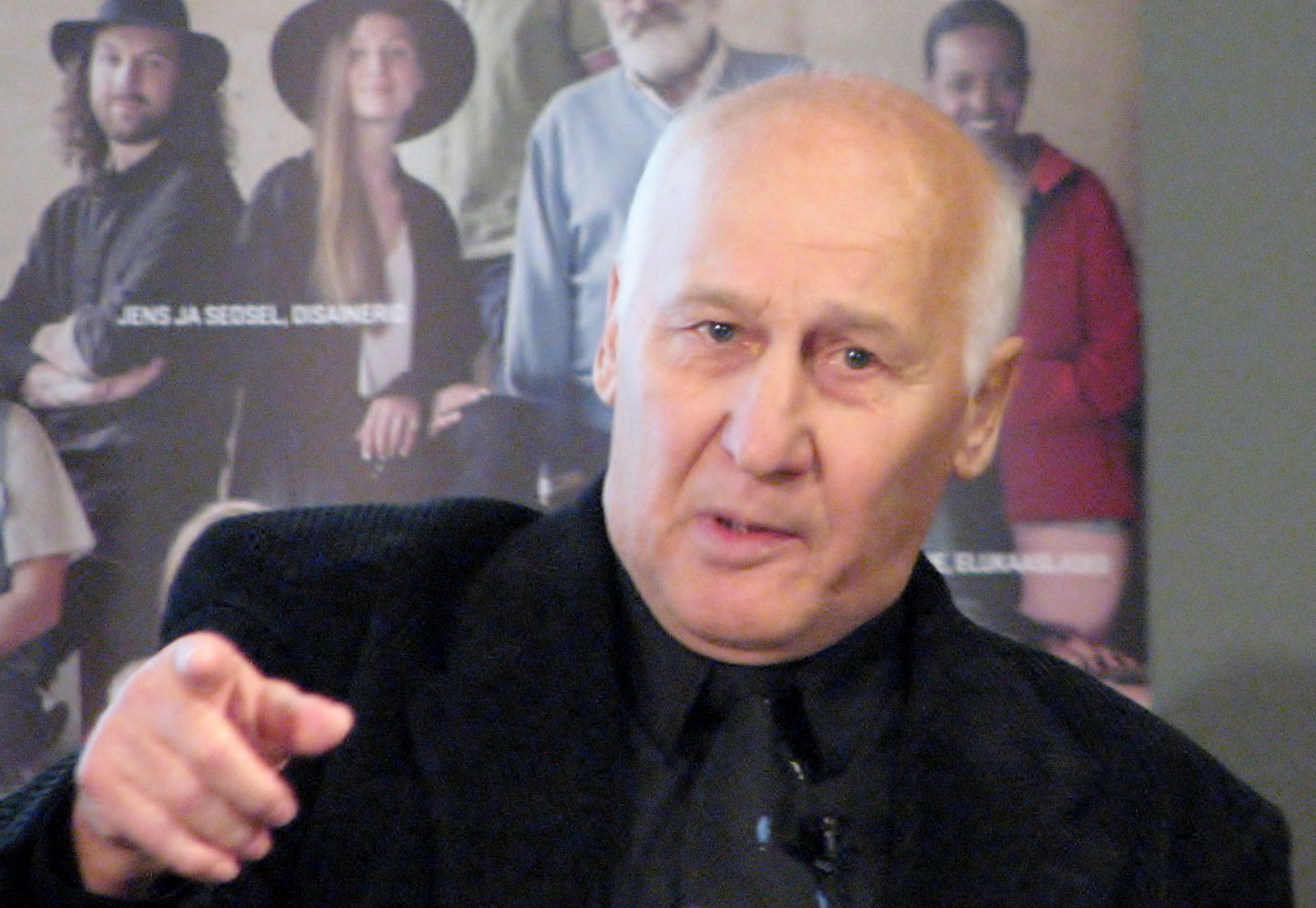

Personal information
- Full name: Roman Ubakivi
- Date of birth: 24 March 1945 (age 81)
- Place of birth: Tallinn, then part of Estonian SSR, Soviet Union

Senior career*
| Years | Team | Apps | (Gls) |
| 1965–1968 | Dünamo | | |
| 1970–1973 | Norma | | |
| 1974 | Pärnu Kalev | | |
| 1977 | Norma | | |

Managerial career
- Lõvid
- 1989: Sport
- 1993–1995: Flora
- 1994–1995: Estonia
- 1996–1997: Estonia U21
- * Club domestic league appearances and goals

Roman Ubakivi (born 24 March 1945) is an Estonian former football player and coach. He founded the youth team Lõvid (English: Lions) for ethnic Estonian players and coached the Estonia national football team from 1994 to 1995. His former pupils include national team centurions Marko Kristal, Mart Poom and Martin Reim.

== Honours ==
=== Player ===
Norma

- Estonian SSR Football Championship: 1970
- Estonian Cup: 1971, 1973

=== Manager ===
Flora

- Meistriliiga: 1993–94, 1994–95
- Estonian Cup: 1994–95

=== Individual ===
5th Class Order of the Estonian Red Cross
