= Aivar Pohlak =

Estonian footballer, coach, and official

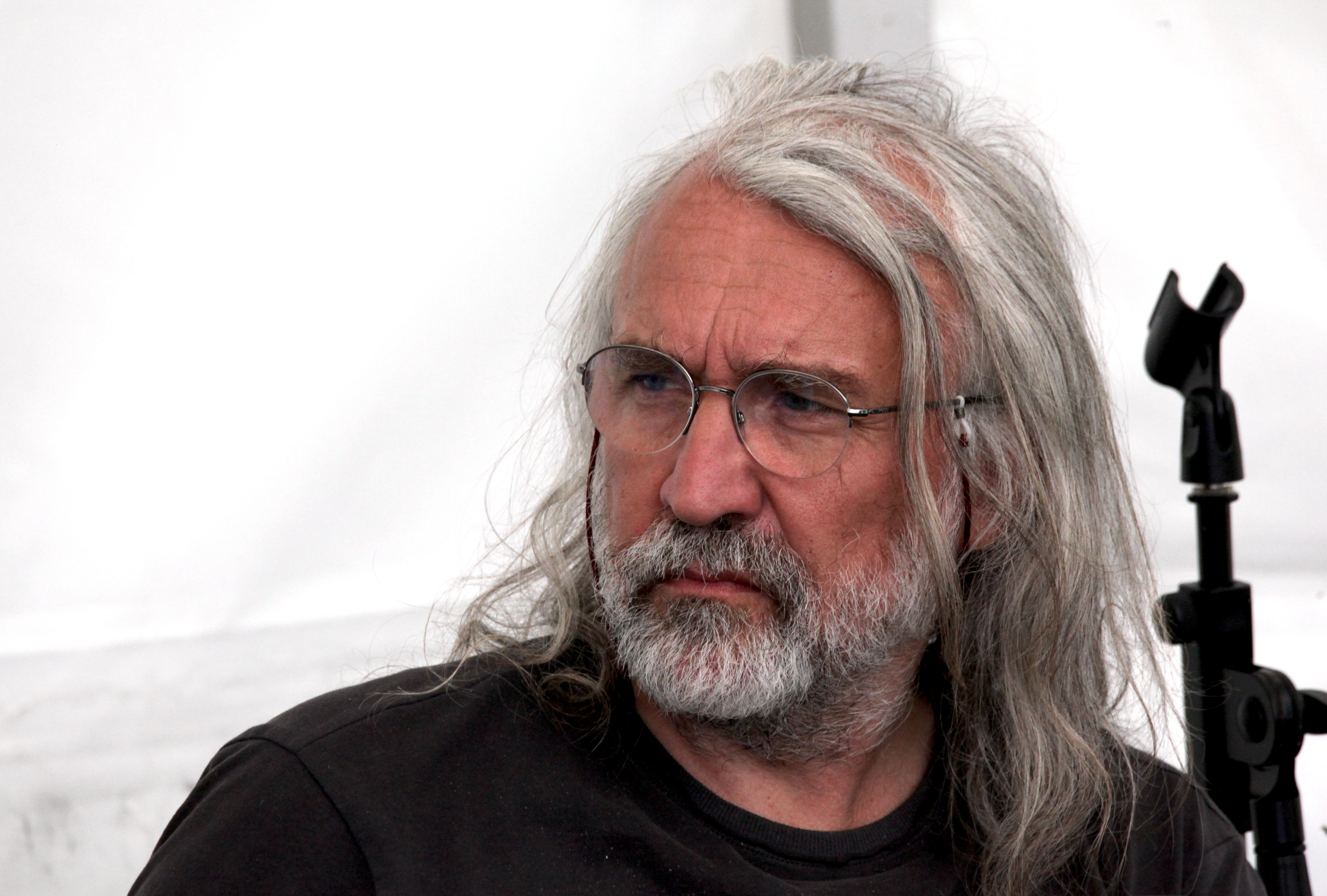
Aivar Pohlak in 2022

Aivar Pohlak (born 19 October 1962) is an Estonian football official, a former football player (striker), referee, and football coach. Since March 2007, he has been the President of the Estonian Football Association (EJL) after being its Vice President for four years. He is the member of UEFA Executive Committee since 2025.

In 1990, Pohlak founded the FC Flora, Estonia's most successful football club, based in Tallinn. In 1997, he founded the FC Kuressaare, current top-division football club based in Kuressaare. In the same year, he also began to build the Lilleküla's football stadium. This is currently the Estonia's largest stadium, opened in 2001. He formally handed over FC Flora to his son Pelle Pohlak in 2016, stating that they practice family-club model.

Pohlak received a national award for his work in January 2002. He also was a children's author in former times.

== Criticism and scandals ==
Pohlak is highly criticized in Estonian media for corruption and unethical involvement with the football club FC Flora as the president of Estonian Football Association, especially with the deals the two organizations made with Lilleküla Stadium.

After divorce from his ex-wife Signe Meisalu, she accused Aivar Pohlak of domestic violence: humiliating and beating her throughout their marriage. The case was dismissed by criminal court for being expired.

On 30 March 2022 at a Kose municipal council meeting, Pohlak insulted and attacked another board member.

In 2025, current and former referees have accused Pohlak of intervening into the appointment process of referees. He was also accused of attacking a referee and ending their career while being an active football player in 1992.

There is an ongoing criminal investigation into a possible anti-competitive agreements between Estonian football clubs – Pohlak offering agreements not to allow players of any age or staff members to change clubs without previous club's consent.

== Personal ==
Pohlak was born in Tallinn. In 2012, he married Triin Edasi, FC Flora information specialist. They started living together 14 years earlier and they also have a daughter.

From his first marriage with Signe Meisalu, Pohlak has 4 children. The couple divorced in 2005.
