= Ingemar Teever =

Estonian footballer

Personal information
- Full name: Ingemar Teever
- Date of birth: 24 February 1983 (age 43)
- Place of birth: Saue, Estonia
- Height: 1.87 m (6 ft 1 1/2 in)
- Position: Forward

Senior career*
Years	Team	Apps	(Gls)
1997–1998	Nõmme Kalju	8	(2)
1999–2001	M.C. Tallinn	64	(39)
2002–2005	TVMK	105	(69)
2005–2007	Öster	42	(5)
2008	→ Nõmme Kalju (loan)	35	(23)
2009–2010	Nõmme Kalju	24	(8)
2010–2012	Pfullendorf	51	(10)
2012–2015	Levadia	109	(53)
2013	Levadia II	1	(1)
2016	Zenit Tallinn	6	(6)
2017	Levadia	23	(4)
2018–2024	Zenit Tallinn	38	(25)

International career
1999	Estonia U17	1	(0)
	Estonia U21	8	(1)
2003–2015	Estonia	30	(4)
- * Club domestic league appearances and goals as of 30 July 2025

Ingemar Teever (born 24 February 1983) is an Estonian former professional footballer who last played as a forward for Estonian Meistriliiga club Levadia.

Teever was the top goalscorer in the 2008 and the 2015 Meistriliiga seasons. Teever was named Meistriliiga Player of the Year in 2015.

== Club career ==
At the age of 19, Teever started his professional career with TVMK, having previously played for lower division clubs Nõmme Kalju and M.C. Tallinn. There he won the 2005 Meistriliiga, Estonian Cup in 2003 and Estonian Supercup in 2005, before leaving the club in 2005.

=== Öster ===
On 1 December 2015, Teever joined the Swedish Allsvenskan club Öster. His first appearances for Öster were very promising, but as competitive matches approached, Teever's scoring record decreased rapidly. Teever scored a total of only five goals during his two seasons in Sweden, despite playing regularly.

=== Nõmme Kalju ===
Teever joined newly promoted Nõmme Kalju on loan after Öster were relegated to Swedish Swedish football Division 1. He became an instant hit, scoring 23 goals in 35 matches, winning the top goalscorer award, and driving the team to the 4th place, just a point behind the third, Trans Narva. After the first season back in Estonia, the player signed a permanent deal. Then he was hit by a knee injury leaving him sidelined for the first half of the season. Teever returned for only 6 appearances, when he injured his neck in a life-threatening pool accident, but made a full recovery and returned for the 2010 season.

=== Pfullendorf ===
On 29 July 2010 it was announced that Ingemar Teever joined German Regionalliga Süd club Pfullendorf. He spent two years in Germany, scoring ten goals in 51 matches.

=== Levadia ===
After his contract expired in May 2012, Teever returned to Estonia and joined Nõmme Kalju's beach soccer team. He was also part of Estonian national team that played 2013 FIFA Beach Soccer World Cup qualification matches in Moscow in the beginning of July. Teever then signed a year-and-a-half long contract with Levadia and was instantly added to the UEFA Europa League squad. He also got offers from Finland and Germany, but decided to stay in Estonia so he could have better chance to return to the national team. On 19 July 2012, Teever made his debut for Levadia when he came on as a second-half substitute in a Europa League match against Cypriot side Anorthosis. He opened his goal scoring tally on his Meistriliiga debut on 23 July 2012, when his injury time free kick found the net against Tallinna Kalev.

== International career ==
Teever made his international debut for the Estonia national football team on 29 March 2003 in a friendly match against Canada.

=== International goals ===
Estonia score listed first, score column indicates score after each Teever goal.

No.	Date	Venue	Opponent	Score	Result	Competition
1	11 June 2004	A. Le Coq Arena, Tallinn, Estonia	North Macedonia	2–3	2–4	Friendly
2	4 September 2004	A. Le Coq Arena, Tallinn, Estonia	Luxembourg	1–0	4–0	2006 FIFA World Cup qualification
3	13 October 2004	Skonto Stadium, Riga, Latvia	Latvia	2–1	2–2	2006 FIFA World Cup qualification
4	16 November 2005	Miejski Stadion Sportowy "KSZO", Ostrowiec Świętokrzyski, Poland	Poland	1–2	1–3	Friendly

== Honours ==
=== Club ===
TVMK

- Meistriliiga: 2005
- Estonian Cup: 2002–03
- Estonian Supercup: 2005

Levadia

- Meistriliiga: 2013, 2014
- Estonian Cup: 2013–14
- Estonian Supercup: 2013, 2015

=== Individual ===
- Meistriliiga Player of the Month: May 2015, August 2015
- Meistriliiga Player of the Year: 2015
- Meistriliiga Top scorer: 2008, 2015
