= Adyam Kuzyayev =

Russian-Tajikistani footballer

Personal information
- Full name: Adyam Kabirovich Kuzyayev
- Date of birth: January 6, 1965 (age 61)
- Place of birth: Dushanbe, Tajikistan
- Height: 1.78 m (5 ft 10 in)
- Positions: Defender; forward

Youth career
- Pamir Dushanbe

Senior career*
Years	Team	Apps	(Gls)
1986	Vakhsh Qurghonteppa	22	(0)
1990	Granit Penza	8	(0)
1993	KamAZavtotsentr	10	(0)
1993–1997	Gazovik Orenburg	93	(2)

Managerial career
- 2001–2004: Gazovik Orenburg (assistant)
- 2003: Gazovik Orenburg (caretaker)
- 2006–2011: Sever Murmansk
- 2012: Petrotrest Saint Petersburg (assistant)
- 2012–2013: Karelia Petrozavodsk
- 2013: Tosno (assistant)
- 2014: Dynamo St. Petersburg (assistant)
- 2014–2015: Dynamo St. Petersburg
- 2015–2018: Narva Trans
- * Club domestic league appearances and goals

Adyam Kabirovich Kuzyayev (Russian: Адьям Кабирович Кузяев; born January 6, 1965) is a Russian-Tajikistani professional football coach and a former player, who last managed Estonia's top tier club Narva Trans from 2015 to 2018. He has formerly managed Russian second league club FC Dynamo St. Petersburg. As a player, he made his debut in the Soviet Second League in 1990 for FC Granit Penza.

His sons Daler Kuzyayev and Ruslan Kuzyayev are professional footballers.

== Honours ==
Individual

- Meistriliiga Manager of the Month: September 2015
