= FC Flora =

Association football club in Estonia

Flora
- Full name: FC Flora Tallinn
- Nickname: Rohevalged (The Green-Whites)
- Founded: 10 March 1990; 36 years ago
- Ground: Lilleküla Stadium
- Capacity: 14,336
- President: Pelle Pohlak
- Head coach: Karl Mööl (interim)
- League: Meistriliiga
- 2026: Meistriliiga, 3rd of 10
- Website: fcflora.ee
Home colours	Away colours

FC Flora, commonly known as Flora Tallinn, or simply as Flora, is an Estonian professional football club based in Tallinn that competes in the Meistriliiga, the top flight of Estonian football. The club's home ground is Lilleküla Stadium.

Formed in 1990, Flora were founding members of the Meistriliiga, and is one of two clubs which have never been relegated from the Estonian top division since its inception in 1992, along with Narva Trans. Flora is the first and only Estonian football club to have played in the group stage of a UEFA club competition, having achieved this in the 2021–22 UEFA Europa Conference League season. Flora have won more trophies than any other club in Estonian football, with 37 titles; including a record 16 Meistriliiga titles, nine Estonian Cups and a record 12 Estonian Supercups.

Flora is known for playing exclusively with Estonian players as the club's transfer policy is to sign players that are native Estonians or who hold Estonian citizenship. The policy is related to Estonian nationalism and to the club's overall aim to develop Estonian football and its culture, which was also the basis upon which Flora was established in 1990.

== History ==
=== Early history (1990–2000) ===
Flora was founded on 10 March 1990 by Aivar Pohlak as an effort to revive Estonian football during the dissolution of the Soviet Union. The team was mainly based on players from Lõvid youth team. Flora finished their first season in last place and were relegated. The situation changed after the formation of the Meistriliiga in 1992. After 52 years of the Soviet occupation (Estonian SSR), Estonian clubs could once again play for the Estonian League Championship title. Flora finished the inaugural season of the Meistriliiga in fourth place. After the first season, the league was reformed to run from Autumn to Spring. Flora finished the 1992–93 season as runners-up. In 1993, Roman Ubakivi was appointed as manager. One round before the end of the 1993–94 season, Tevalte, who led the Meistriliiga table at the time, was controversially disqualified over allegations of match fixing. The season ended with Flora and Norma both on equal 36 points. Flora won the championship play-off match 5–2 and was awarded their first league title. The club made their European debut in the 1994–95 UEFA Cup, losing to Odense 0–6 on aggregate in the preliminary round. Flora managed to defend the league title in the 1994–95 season and won the 1994–95 Estonian Cup, defeating Lantana-Marlekor 2–0 in the final.

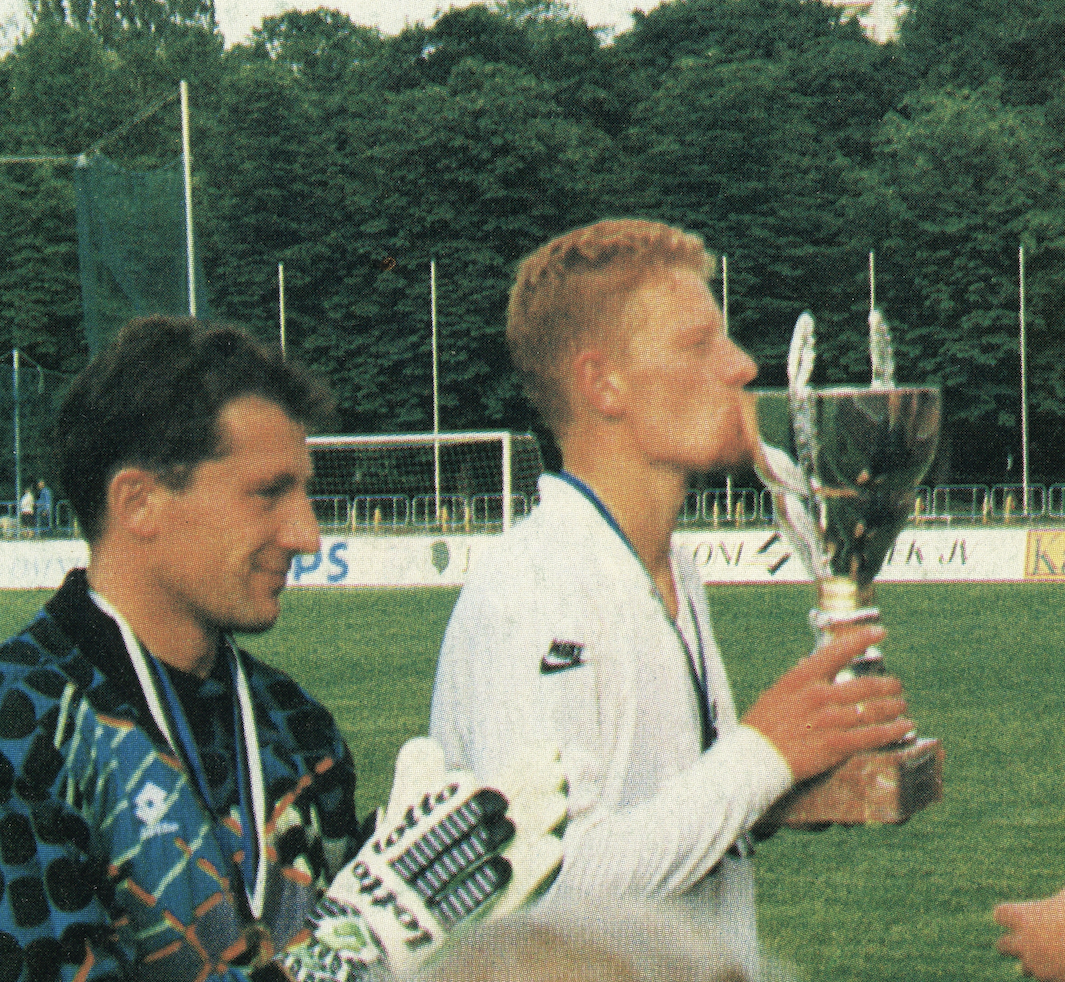
Marek Lemsalu lifting Flora's first-ever Estonian Cup in 1995

In January 1996, Teitur Thordarson replaced Ubakivi as manager. Disappointing start in the 1995–96 season left the team in second place. Flora finished the 1996–97 season as runners-up once again. In the 1997–98 season, the club won their first league title under Thordarson. Subsequently, the league format was changed and Flora managed to win another title in the same calendar year. Flora made their debut in the UEFA Champions League for the first time in the 1998–99 season, narrowly losing to Steaua București 4–5 on aggregate in the first qualifying round. The club added another Estonian Cup trophy after defeating Lantana 3–2 in the finals. Since 1999, Meistriliiga adopted the current league format with the season running from Spring to Autumn within a single calendar year. The 1999 season was unsuccessful as Flora placed third. In 2000, Tarmo Rüütli was appointed as manager. Under Rüütli, Flora finished the 2000 season as runners-up behind Levadia, who won the title without a single loss.

=== New stadium and a new era (2001–2017) ===
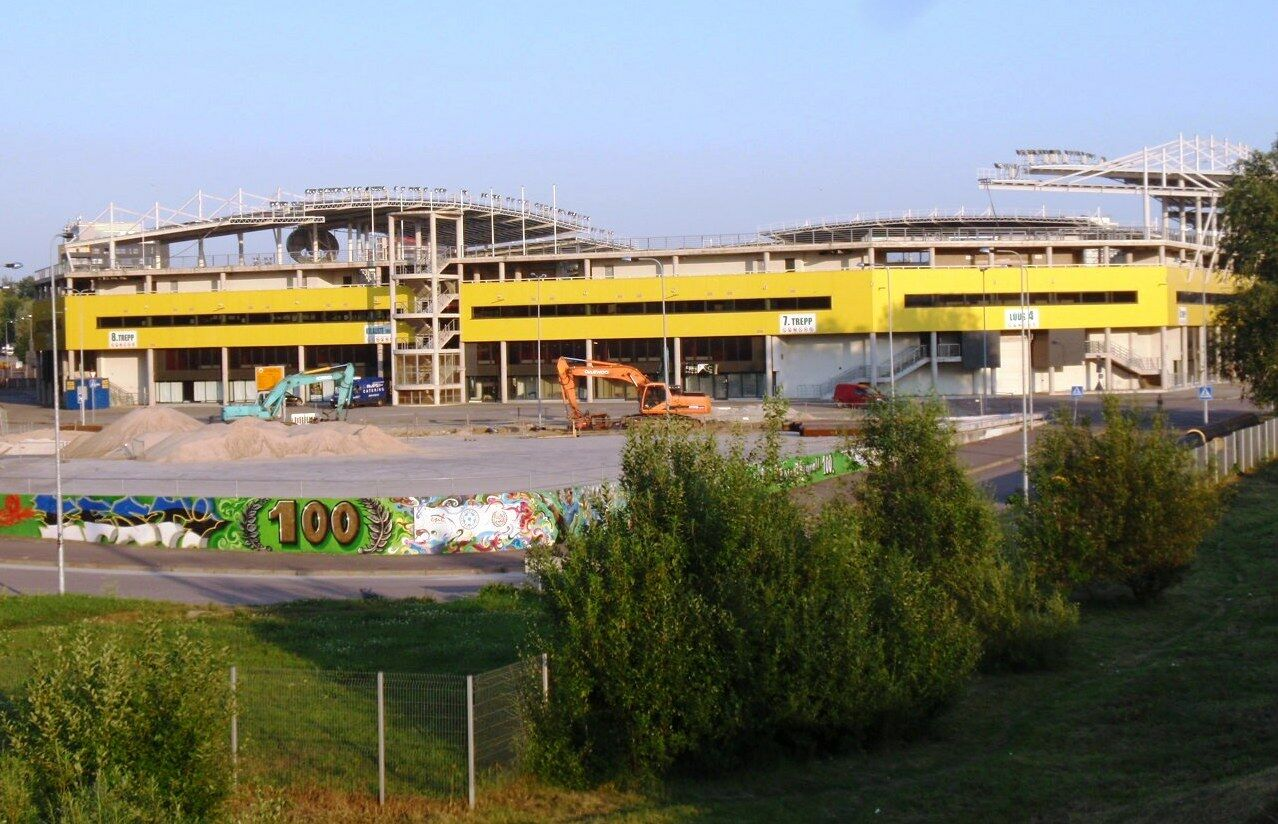
Construction around Lilleküla Stadium

In 2001, a new era began for Flora as the club moved to the new Lilleküla Stadium and Rüütli was replaced by Arno Pijpers. Under Pijpers, Flora won three consecutive Meistriliiga titles in 2001, 2002 and 2003. In the 2003 season, Flora won the league without losing a single league match, extending their unbeaten run from the previous season to 37, while Tor Henning Hamre scored a record 39 goals in a season. Pijpers left Flora in September 2004, before the end of the 2004 season, and was replaced by Janno Kivisild. The team failed to defend the league title for another season, finishing in third place.

The 2005 season was unsuccessful as Flora placed fourth, 26 points behind the league champions TVMK. This was the first time Flora didn't win a Meistriliiga medal since 1992. After the disappointing season, Kivisild was replaced by Pasi Rautiainen. In the 2006–07 UEFA Cup, Flora defeated Lyn Oslo 1–1 on aggregate on away goals in the first qualifying round, before losing to Brøndby 0–4 on aggregate in the second qualifying round. The club finished the 2006 season in third place and placed second in the 2007 season. Flora also suffered their biggest margin of defeat in the Meistriliiga thus far, losing 0–6 to TVMK in 2007. Flora finished the 2008 season as runners-up, behind Levadia once again, despite amassing 91 points and scoring 113 goals. Tarmo Rüütli returned to Flora for the 2009 season, but failed to lead the club to winning the league, placing fourth. Flora were more successful in the Estonian Cup, winning the trophy in 2008 and 2009.

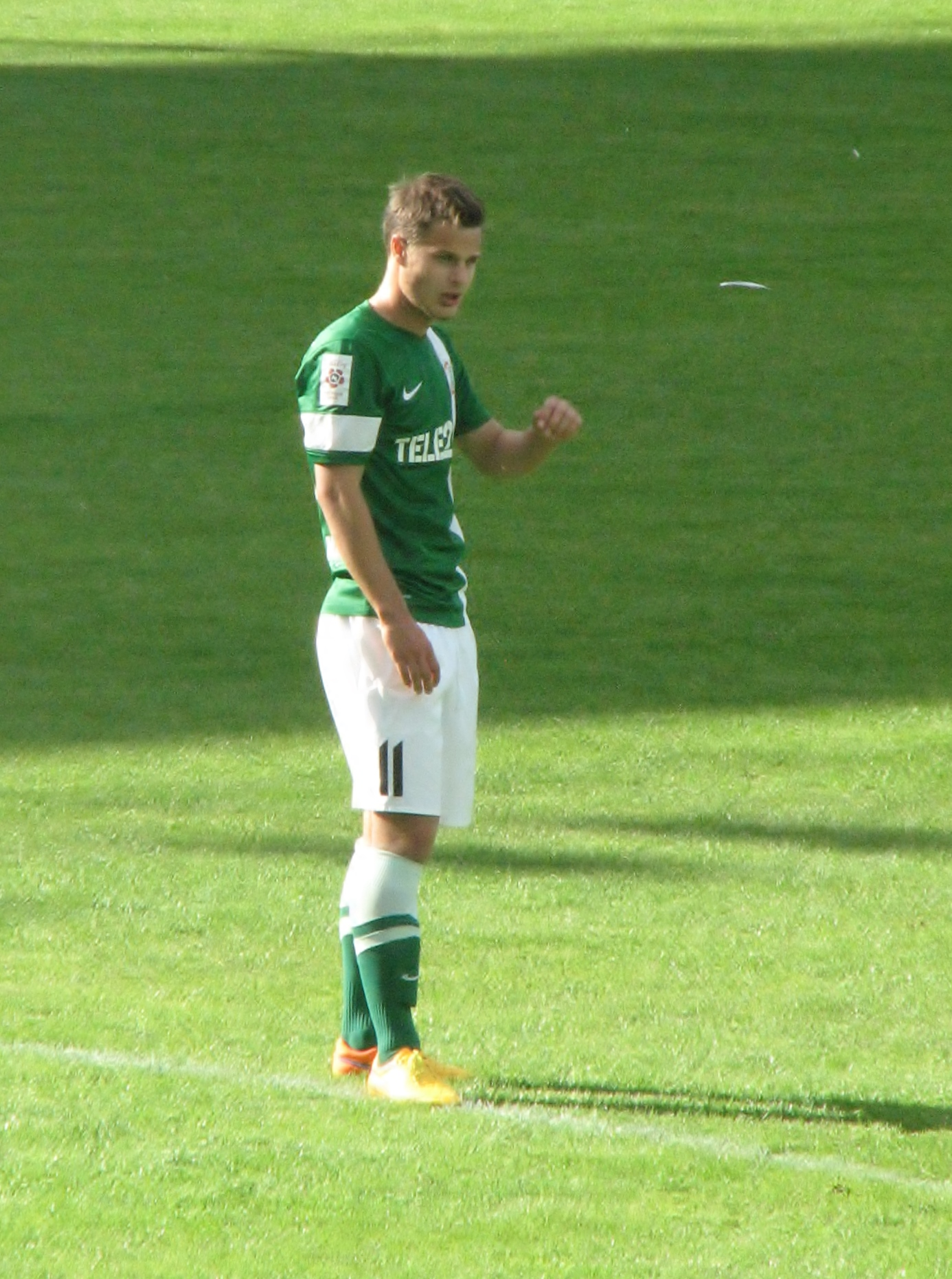
Rauno Sappinen is Flora's all-time record goalscorer

In 2010, Rüütli was replaced by the former Flora player and Estonia national team record cap holder Martin Reim. Under Reim, rejuvenated Flora ended the reign of Levadia who had won the four previous Meistriliiga titles and won the league in the 2010 season. Flora successfully defended their title in the 2011 season and won the 2010–11 Estonian Cup, defeating Narva Trans 2–0 in the final. Flora finished the 2012 season in third place, behind the champions Nõmme Kalju and Levadia. After the season, Reim left the club and was replaced Marko Lelov in December 2012. Lelov won the 2012–13 Estonian Cup, but was sacked in July 2013 after disappointing results in the league. He was replaced by Norbert Hurt, initially as a caretaker, with position being made permanent later. Flora finished the 2013 season in fourth place and placed third in 2014.

In 2015, Flora celebrated their 25th anniversary by winning their 10th league title in the 34th round of the season. The club also won the 2015–16 Estonian Cup, defeating Sillamäe Kalev 3–0 in extra time in the final. In May 2016, Aivar Pohlak resigned from the club's presidency and was succeeded by his son Pelle Pohlak. In the first qualifying round of the 2016–17 UEFA Champions League, Flora lost to Lincoln Red Imps 2–3 on aggregate, after which Hurt resigned and was replaced by Argo Arbeiter. Flora finished the disappointing 2016 season in fourth place. Arbeiter was sacked and in January 2017, Arno Pijpers returned to take over as manager. In the 2017 season, Flora won their 11th Meistriliiga title. In December 2017, it was announced that Pijpers will not continue as manager.

=== Jürgen Henn era (2018–2023) ===
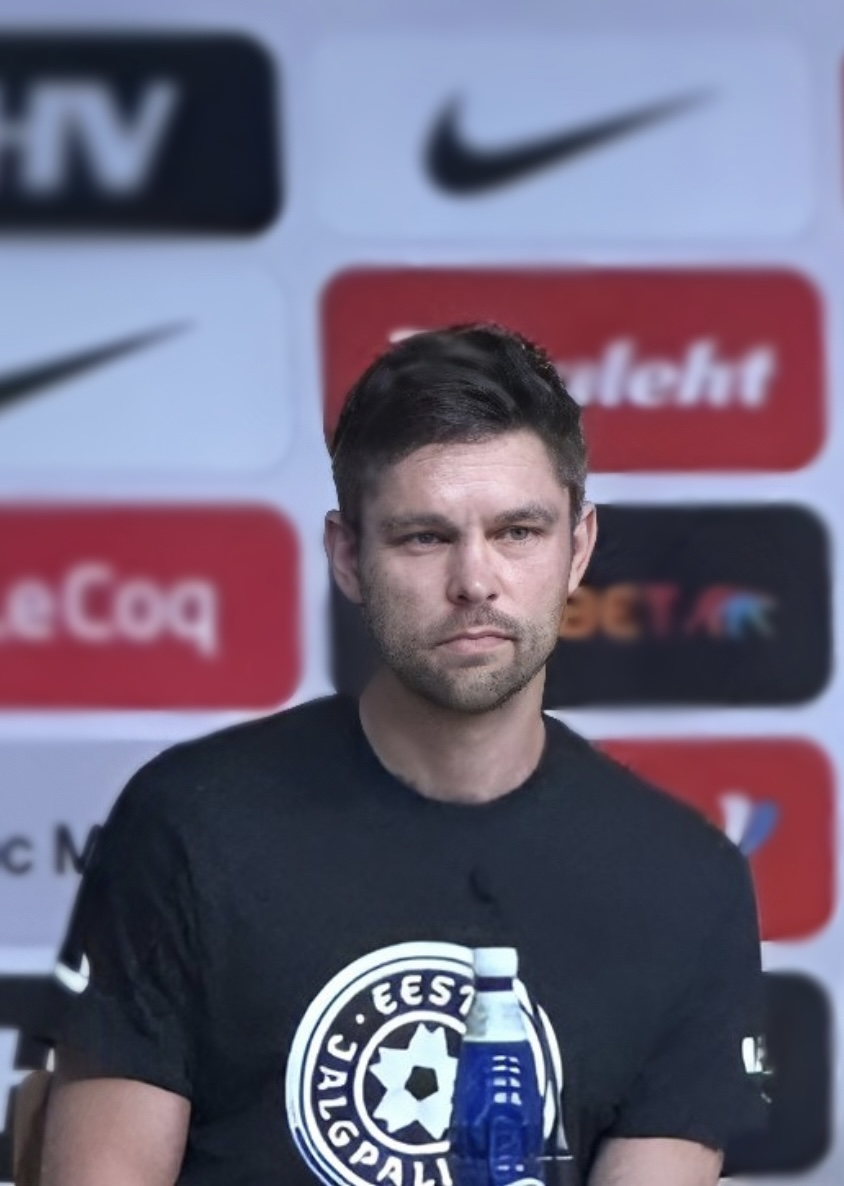
Jürgen Henn is the most successful head coach in FC Flora's history

Jürgen Henn was appointed in Pijpers' place in January 2018. Under Henn, Flora won the 2019 Meistriliiga and advanced through the first qualifying round of Europa League, beating Radnički Niš 4–2 on aggregate. Flora faced Eintracht Frankfurt in the second round which brought a record 8,537 people onto the stands in Tallinn, as Flora narrowly lost 1–2 with Mihkel Ainsalu scoring for the hosts. The second leg saw Flora face the German side at the sold out Waldstadion, where they were again defeated 1–2 in front of a crowd of 48,000. Despite the result, Flora players were celebrated by the Eintracht fans after the final whistle for their impressive performance, with Eintracht manager Adi Hütter labelling the scene as extraordinary and touching. Led by Jürgen Henn, Flora won the treble in 2020 by lifting the 2020 Estonian Supercup, the 2019–20 Estonian Cup and the 2020 Meistriliiga title. The club also advanced to the UEFA Europa League qualifying play-offs, where they lost 1–3 to Dinamo Zagreb on 1 October 2020.

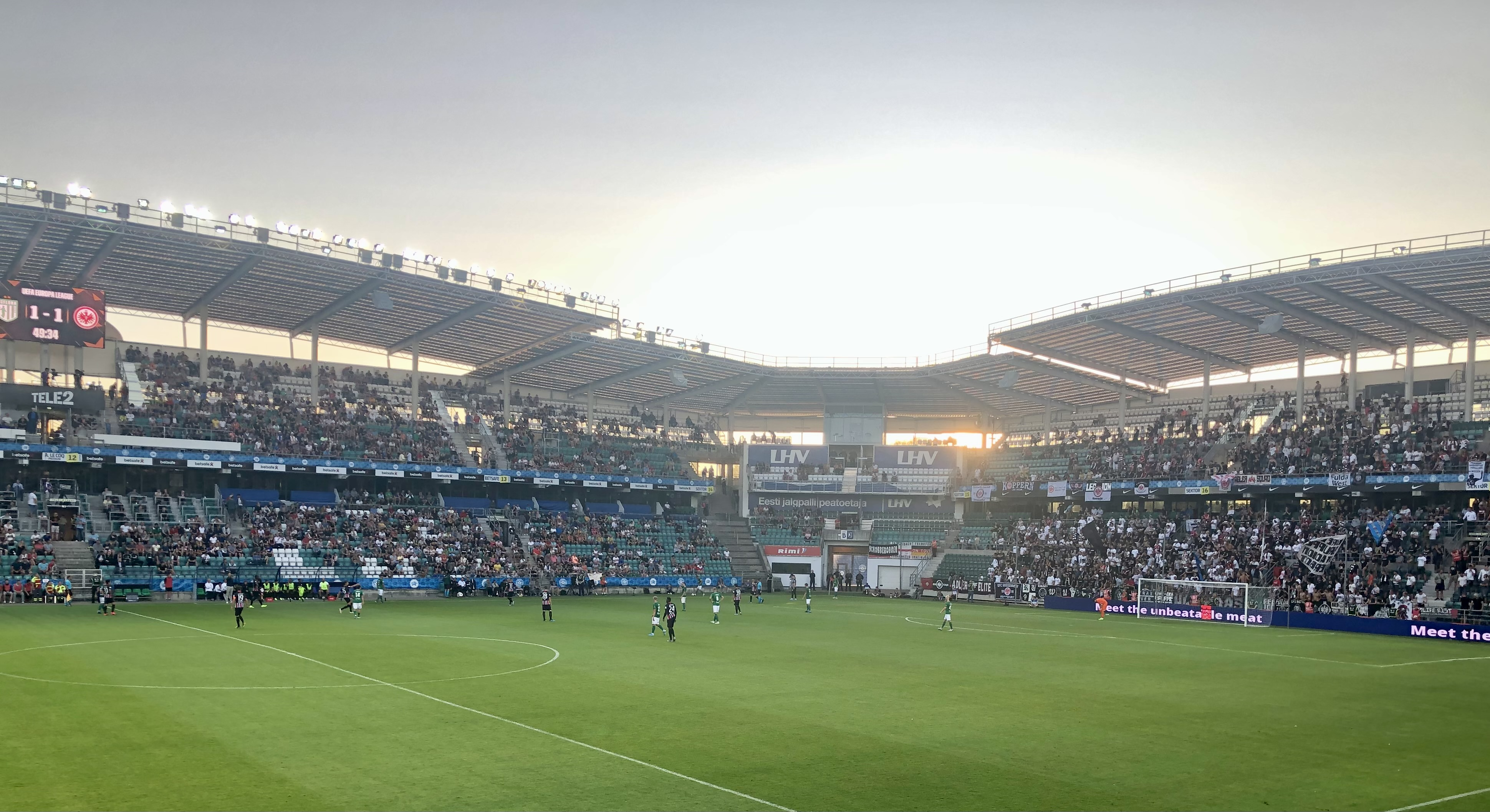
Flora facing Eintracht Frankfurt in the UEFA Europa League second qualifying round in 2019

Flora became the first Estonian side to advance to a UEFA club competitions group stage when they beat Shamrock Rovers 5–2 on aggregate to qualify for the 2021–22 UEFA Europa Conference League on 26 August 2021, where they were drawn into group B against Gent of Belgium, Partizan of Serbia and Anorthosis Famagusta of Cyprus. The 2–2 draw away against Anorthosis was the first ever point picked up by an Estonian side in UEFA group stage history, with Rauno Sappinen scoring both goals as Flora came from 2–0 down to earn a point in Cyprus. On match day 5, Flora made more history by beating Partizan 1–0 in Tallinn, thanks to a goal from Martin Miller. This result meant that they became the first ever Estonian side to win a game in a UEFA group stage.

After finishing the 2021 Meistriliiga season as runners-up, FC Flora won their 14th Estonian championship title in the 2022 season, earning 97 points and thus repeating Levadia's 2009 record of most points in a season. Flora lifted their 15th league title in 2023. On 30 November 2023, Jürgen Henn announced he will be stepping down after six years in charge, marking the end of the longest and most successful managerial tenure in Flora's history.

=== Recent history (2024–present) ===
Flora replaced Henn with their sporting director and former manager Norbert Hurt, under whom the club started the 2024 season by lifting their 12th Estonian Supercup in February 2024. However in July, Hurt resigned after a disappointing 0–5 home loss in the Champions League first qualifying round and was replaced by the club's U21 head coach Taavi Viik. Flora finished the 2024 season in fourth place, their first outside the top three finish in eight years. The club appointed their recently retired player Konstantin Vassiljev as head coach for the 2025 season and lifted their 16th league title in Vassiljev's debut year as manager.

== Crest and colours ==
Flora crest features the Greco-Roman goddess Flora, after whom the club is named. The club's colours are green and white, symbolizing growth, purity and honesty. Since 2024, Flora's first team crest also features three stars as the club won their 15th league title in 2023.

1990–2016

2016–present

== Kit manufacturers and shirt sponsors ==
Period	Kit manufacturer	Shirt sponsor	Ref
1997–2001	Nike	VH Sportmedia	
2003–2004	Nike	Radiolinja	
2005–2010	Nike	Elisa	
2010–2013	Nike	KH Energia-Konsult	
2014–2020	Nike	Tele2	
2021–2025	Nike	Optibet	
2026	Nike	zondacrypto	

== Stadium ==
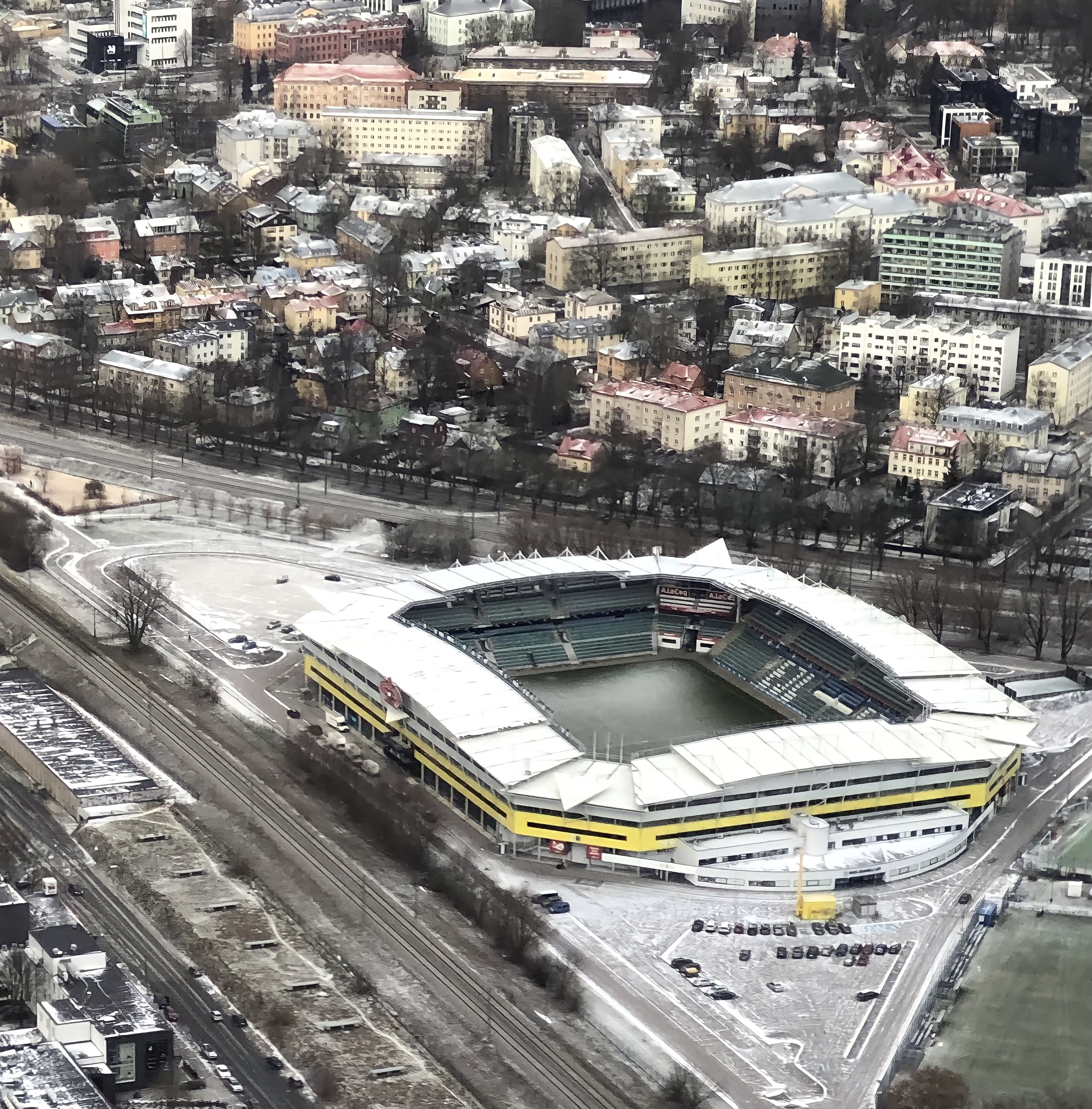
Lilleküla Stadium, December 2021

The club's home ground is the 14,336-seat Lilleküla Stadium. Opened in 2001 and expanded from 2016 to 2018, it is the largest football stadium in Estonia. The Lilleküla Football Complex also includes two grass surface pitches, two artificial turf pitches and an indoor hall. Lilleküla Stadium is located at Jalgpalli 21, Kesklinn, Tallinn.

Flora uses Sportland Arena artificial turf ground, located next to Lilleküla Stadium, for home matches during winter and early spring months, as natural grass grounds are not playable during the period due to the region's harsh winter climate.

== Rivalries ==
=== The Tallinn Derby ===
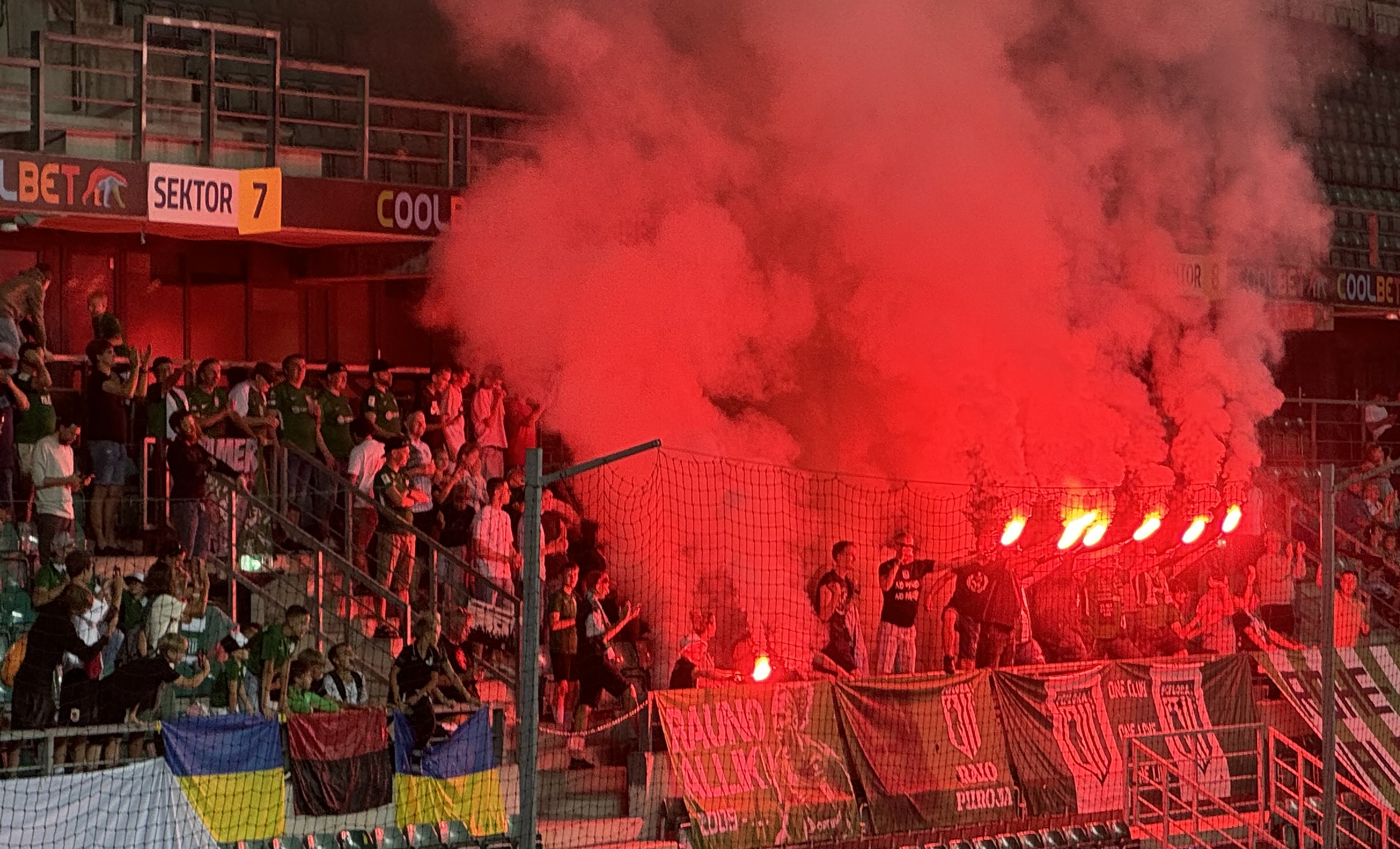
Flora fans during their match against Levadia in 2024

Flora's deepest rivalry is with FCI Levadia and the fixture between the two clubs is known as the Tallinn Derby (Estonian: Tallinna derbi). Flora and Levadia are the two biggest and most successful clubs in Estonian football. The rivalry began in 1999, when Levadia entered Meistriliiga and immediately challenged the reigning champions Flora for the title, winning the treble in their first year in top-flight football. In the early 2000s, language and nationality was also one of the separating factors between the two clubs, as Levadia was seen as the club of choice for the Russian speaking population of the city and Flora for the Estonian speaking. However, that image of Levadia has since then faded away. From 2019, the two clubs also share their home ground A. Le Coq Arena. The attendance record of 3,510 was set on 28 June 2023.

=== Flora–Kalju rivalry ===
The fixture between Flora and Nõmme Kalju FC is known as raudteederbi (English: The Railway Derby). The name derives from the fact that the stadiums of the two clubs are connected via a railway. The rivalry emerged in the early 2010s, when Kalju started challenging Flora in terms of on-field success, as well as in fan popularity. Throughout the years, the rivalry has also intensified due to an enmity between Flora's founder Aivar Pohlak and Kalju's president Kuno Tehva. Flora's signing of Kalju's homegrown players Henrik Pürg and Vlasiy Sinyavskiy in 2018 caused a further strife in the relationship of the two clubs and since then, no transfer deals have taken place between them. In an interview in 2023, Flora's record goalscorer Rauno Sappinen said he would rather retire than join Kalju. The fixture's attendance record of 3,521 was set in the 2013 Estonian Cup final.

== Players ==
=== First-team squad ===
As of 15 October 2026.

Note: Flags indicate national team as defined under FIFA eligibility rules; some limited exceptions apply. Players may hold more than one non-FIFA nationality.

No.	Pos.	Nation	Player
2	DF	EST	Nikita Kalmõkov
3	DF	EST	Airon Kollo
4	DF	EST	Matvei Jekimov
6	DF	EST	Robert Veering
7	FW	EST	Danil Kuraksin
8	MF	EST	Tristan Toomas Teeväli
9	FW	EST	Rauno Alliku (captain)
14	FW	EST	Tony Varjund
17	FW	EST	Taaniel Usta
18	MF	EST	Remo Valdmets
20	FW	EST	Sergei Zenjov
22	GK	EST	Andero Tatrik

No.	Pos.	Nation	Player
23	DF	EST	Mihhail Kolobov
24	DF	EST	Oscar Pihela
26	DF	EST	Sander Tovstik
29	FW	EST	Sander Alamaa
32	MF	EST	Vladislav Kreida
33	GK	EST	Evert Grünvald
50	FW	EST	Erik Sorga
67	MF	EST	Ilja Antonov
78	DF	EST	Mark Hendrik Kukk
89	MF	EST	Maksim Kalimullin
99	GK	EST	Kaur Kivila

=== Out on loan ===
Note: Flags indicate national team as defined under FIFA eligibility rules; some limited exceptions apply. Players may hold more than one non-FIFA nationality.

No.	Pos.	Nation	Player
15	MF	EST	Deivid Andreas (at Kuressaare until 31 December 2026)
77	GK	EST	Kristen Lapa (at Tammeka until 31 December 2026)

No.	Pos.	Nation	Player
—	FW	EST	Gregor Rõivassepp (at Kuressaare until 31 December 2026)
—	FW	EST	Mark Anders Lepik (at Vaprus until 31 December 2026)

=== Retired numbers ===
12 – Club supporters (the 12th Man)

== Club officials ==
=== Current technical staff ===
Position	Name
Head coach	(Estonia) Karl Mööl (interim)
Assistant coach	(Estonia) Ats Sillaste
Goalkeeping coach	(Estonia) Aiko Orgla
Video analyst	(Estonia) Ants Jaakson
Fitness coach	(Brazil) Alonso Lourenço De Lima
Physiotherapists	(Estonia) Maali Pruul
Physiotherapists	(Estonia) Markus Pikkor
Physiotherapists	(Estonia) Oliver Papp
Management
President	(Estonia) Pelle Pohlak
Chief Executive Officer	(Estonia) Sergei Hohlov-Simson
Sporting Director	(Estonia) Taavi Trasberg

=== Managerial history ===
Dates	Name
1990–1991	(Estonia) Aivar Pohlak
1992	(Lithuania) Raimondas Kotovas
1993–1995	(Estonia) Roman Ubakivi
1996–1999	(Iceland) Teitur Thordarson
2000	(Estonia) Tarmo Rüütli
2001–2004	(Netherlands) Arno Pijpers
2004–2005	(Estonia) Janno Kivisild
2006–2008	(Finland) Pasi Rautiainen
2009	(Estonia) Tarmo Rüütli
2010–2012	(Estonia) Martin Reim
2012–2013	(Estonia) Marko Lelov
2013–2016	(Estonia) Norbert Hurt
2016	(Estonia) Argo Arbeiter
2017–2018	(Netherlands) Arno Pijpers
2018–2023	(Estonia) Jürgen Henn
2024	(Estonia) Norbert Hurt
2024	(Estonia) Taavi Viik
2025–2026	(Estonia) Konstantin Vassiljev

== Honours ==
=== Domestic ===
==== League ====
- Meistriliiga
  - Winners (16): 1993–94, 1994–95, 1997–98, 1998, 2001, 2002, 2003, 2010, 2011, 2015, 2017, 2019, 2020, 2022, 2023, 2025

==== Cups ====
- Estonian Cup
  - Winners (9): 1994–95, 1997–98, 2007–08, 2008–09, 2010–11, 2012–13, 2015–16, 2019–20, 2025–26
- Estonian Supercup
  - Winners (12): 1998, 2002, 2003, 2004, 2009, 2011, 2012, 2014, 2016, 2020, 2021, 2024

=== Regional ===
- Livonia Cup
  - Winners (3): 2011, 2018, 2023

== Seasons ==
Season	Division	Pos	Pld	W	D	L	GF	GA	GD	Pts	Top goalscorer	Cup	Supercup
1992	Meistriliiga	4	13	8	3	2	53	13	+40	19	(Estonia) Urmas Kirs (11)		
1992–93	Meistriliiga	2	22	15	4	3	63	13	+50	34	(Estonia) Indro Olumets (Estonia) Martin Reim (11)	Quarter-finals	
1993–94	Meistriliiga	1	22	15	6	1	61	9	+52	36	(Estonia) Urmas Kirs (8)	Semi-finals	
1994–95	Meistriliiga	1	24	17	7	0	59	10	+49	58	(Lithuania) Ričardas Zdančius (12)	Winners	
1995–96	Meistriliiga	2	24	12	6	6	51	22	+29	42	(Estonia) Lembit Rajala (16)	Quarter-finals	
1996–97	Meistriliiga	2	24	16	4	4	52	16	+36	52	(Estonia) Andres Oper (13)	Quarter-finals	
1997–98	Meistriliiga	1	24	19	3	2	73	16	+57	60	(Estonia) Andres Oper (15)	Winners	
1998	Meistriliiga	1	14	11	2	1	46	14	+32	35	(Estonia) Andres Oper (Estonia) Indrek Zelinski (10)		Winners
1999	Meistriliiga	3	28	13	8	7	60	33	+27	47	(Estonia) Indrek Zelinski (14)	Semi-finals	Runners-up
2000	Meistriliiga	2	28	16	7	5	51	25	+26	55	(Estonia) Meelis Rooba (10)		
2001	Meistriliiga	1	28	21	5	2	62	18	+44	68	(Estonia) Aleksandr Kulik (14)	Runners-up	
2002	Meistriliiga	1	28	20	4	4	79	25	+54	64	(Norway) Tor Henning Hamre (23)	Quarter-finals	Winners
2003	Meistriliiga	1	28	24	4	0	105	21	+84	76	(Norway) Tor Henning Hamre (39)	Runners-up	Winners
2004	Meistriliiga	3	28	18	4	6	83	25	+58	58	(Estonia) Vjatšeslav Zahovaiko (28)	Semi-finals	Winners
2005	Meistriliiga	4	36	21	6	9	81	36	+45	69	(Estonia) Vjatšeslav Zahovaiko (19)	Semi-finals	
2006	Meistriliiga	3	36	26	4	6	93	34	+59	82	(Estonia) Vjatšeslav Zahovaiko (25)	Runners-up	Runners-up
2007	Meistriliiga	2	36	26	5	5	108	30	+78	83	(Estonia) Jarmo Ahjupera (17)	Second round	
2008	Meistriliiga	2	36	28	7	1	113	28	+85	91	(Estonia) Sander Post (19)	Winners	
2009	Meistriliiga	4	36	22	6	8	79	31	+48	72	(Estonia) Alo Dupikov (Estonia) Vjatšeslav Zahovaiko (13)	Winners	Winners
2010	Meistriliiga	1	36	29	4	3	104	32	+72	91	(Estonia) Sander Post (24)	Runners-up	Runners-up
2011	Meistriliiga	1	36	26	8	2	100	24	+76	86	(Estonia) Henri Anier (21)	Winners	Winners
2012	Meistriliiga	3	36	26	3	7	87	24	+63	81	(Georgia (country)) Zakaria Beglarishvili (17)	Semi-finals	Winners
2013	Meistriliiga	4	36	21	5	10	83	40	+43	68	(Estonia) Albert Prosa (16)	Winners	
2014	Meistriliiga	3	36	24	7	5	88	36	+52	79	(Estonia) Albert Prosa (22)	Fourth round	Winners
2015	Meistriliiga	1	36	27	3	6	72	24	+48	84	(Estonia) Rauno Sappinen (16)	Semi-finals	
2016	Meistriliiga	4	36	21	10	5	96	31	+65	73	(Estonia) Rauno Sappinen (19)	Winners	Winners
2017	Meistriliiga	1	36	28	6	2	100	28	+72	90	(Estonia) Rauno Sappinen (27)	Fourth round	Runners-up
2018	Meistriliiga	3	36	25	8	3	116	32	+84	83	(Georgia (country)) Zakaria Beglarishvili (30)	Runners-up	Runners-up
2019	Meistriliiga	1	36	29	3	4	110	21	+89	90	(Estonia) Erik Sorga (31)	Fourth round	
2020	Meistriliiga	1	29	26	2	1	76	17	+59	80	(Estonia) Rauno Sappinen (26)	Winners	Winners
2021	Meistriliiga	2	32	23	8	1	90	23	+67	77	(Estonia) Rauno Sappinen (23)	Runners-up	Winners
2022	Meistriliiga	1	36	31	4	1	94	21	+73	97	(Estonia) Konstantin Vassiljev (13)	Semi-finals	Runners-up
2023	Meistriliiga	1	36	23	10	3	74	24	+50	79	(Estonia) Konstantin Vassiljev (14)	Runners-up	Runners-up
2024	Meistriliiga	4	36	21	7	8	69	43	+26	70	(Estonia) Sergei Zenjov (17)	Quarter-finals	Winners
2025	Meistriliiga	1	36	26	4	6	84	31	+53	82	(Estonia) Rauno Sappinen (21)	Third round	

== European record ==
=== UEFA club competition record ===
Season	Competition	Round	Opponent	Home	Away	Agg.
1994–95	UEFA Cup	Preliminary round	(Denmark) Odense	0–3	0–3	0–6
1995–96	UEFA Cup	Preliminary round	(Norway) Lillestrøm	1–0	0–4	1–4
1996–97	UEFA Cup	Preliminary round	(Finland) Haka	0–1	2–2	2–3
1997–98	UEFA Cup	First qualifying round	(Israel) Hapoel Petah Tikva	1–2	0–1	1–3
1998–99	UEFA Champions League	First qualifying round	(Romania) Steaua București	3–1	1–4	4–5
1999–00	UEFA Champions League	First qualifying round	(Serbia and Montenegro) Partizan Belgrade	1–4	0–6	1–10
2000–01	UEFA Cup	Qualifying round	(Belgium) Club Brugge	0–2	1–4	1–6
2001–02	UEFA Cup	Qualifying round	(Croatia) Dinamo Zagreb	0–1	0–1	0–2
2002–03	UEFA Champions League	First qualifying round	(Cyprus) APOEL	0–0	0–1	0–1
2003–04	UEFA Champions League	First qualifying round	(Moldova) Sheriff Tiraspol	1–1	0–1	1–2
2004–05	UEFA Champions League	First qualifying round	(Slovenia) Gorica	2–4	1–3	3–7
2005–06	UEFA Cup	First qualifying round	(Denmark) Esbjerg	0–6	2–1	2–7
2006–07	UEFA Cup	First qualifying round	(Norway) Lyn Oslo	0–0	1–1	1–1 (a)
2006–07	UEFA Cup	Second qualifying round	(Denmark) Brøndby	0–0	0–4	0–4
2007–08	UEFA Cup	First qualifying round	(Norway) Vålerenga	0–1	0–1	0–2
2008–09	UEFA Cup	First qualifying round	(Sweden) Djurgården	2–2	0–0	2–2 (a)
2009–10	UEFA Europa League	Second qualifying round	(Denmark) Brøndby	1–4	1–0	2–4
2010–11	UEFA Europa League	First qualifying round	(Georgia (country)) Dinamo Tbilisi	0–0	1–2	1–2
2011–12	UEFA Champions League	Second qualifying round	(Republic of Ireland) Shamrock Rovers	0–0	0–1	0–1
2012–13	UEFA Champions League	Second qualifying round	(Switzerland) Basel	0–2	0–3	0–5
2013–14	UEFA Europa League	First qualifying round	(Albania) Kukësi	1–1	0–0	1–1 (a)
2015–16	UEFA Europa League	First qualifying round	(North Macedonia) Rabotnički	1–0	0–2	1–2
2016–17	UEFA Champions League	First qualifying round	(Gibraltar) Lincoln Red Imps	2–1	0–2	2–3
2017–18	UEFA Europa League	First qualifying round	(Slovenia) Domžale	2–3	0–2	2–5
2018–19	UEFA Champions League	First qualifying round	(Israel) Hapoel Be'er Sheva	1–4	1–3	2–7
2018–19	UEFA Europa League	Second qualifying round	(Cyprus) APOEL	2–0	0–5	2–5
2019–20	UEFA Europa League	First qualifying round	(Serbia) Radnički Niš	2–0	2–2	4–2
2019–20	UEFA Europa League	Second qualifying round	(Germany) Eintracht Frankfurt	1–2	1–2	2–4
2020–21	UEFA Champions League	First qualifying round	(Lithuania) Sūduva	1–1 (a.e.t.) (2–4 p)	—N/a	—N/a
2020–21	UEFA Europa League	Second qualifying round	(Iceland) KR	2–1	—N/a	—N/a
2020–21	UEFA Europa League	Third qualifying round	(Malta) Floriana	—N/a	0–0 (a.e.t.); 4–2 p	—N/a
2020–21	UEFA Europa League	Play-off round	(Croatia) Dinamo Zagreb	—N/a	1–3	—N/a
2021–22	UEFA Champions League	First qualifying round	(Malta) Hibernians	2–0	3–0	5–0
2021–22	UEFA Champions League	Second qualifying round	(Poland) Legia Warsaw	0–1	1–2	1–3
2021–22	UEFA Europa League	Third qualifying round	(Cyprus) Omonia	2−1 (a.e.t.)	0–1	2−2 (4–5 p)
2021–22	UEFA Europa Conference League	Play-off round	(Republic of Ireland) Shamrock Rovers	4–2	1–0	5–2
2021–22	UEFA Europa Conference League	Group B	(Belgium) Gent	0–1	0–1	4th
2021–22	UEFA Europa Conference League	Group B	(Serbia) Partizan	1–0	0–2	4th
2021–22	UEFA Europa Conference League	Group B	(Cyprus) Anorthosis Famagusta	2–2	2–2	4th
2022–23	UEFA Europa Conference League	First qualifying round	(Finland) SJK	1–0	2–4 (a.e.t.)	3–4
2023–24	UEFA Champions League	First qualifying round	(Poland) Raków Częstochowa	0–3	0–1	0–4
2023–24	UEFA Europa Conference League	Second qualifying round	Bye	—N/a	—N/a	—N/a
2023–24	UEFA Europa Conference League	Third qualifying round	(Romania) Farul Constanța	0–2	0–3	0–5
2024–25	UEFA Champions League	First qualifying round	(Slovenia) Celje	0–5	1–2	1–7
2024–25	UEFA Conference League	Second qualifying round	(San Marino) Virtus	5–2 (a.e.t.)	0–0	5–2
2024–25	UEFA Conference League	Third qualifying round	(Iceland) Víkingur Reykjavík	1–2	1–1	2–3
2025–26	UEFA Conference League	First qualifying round	(Iceland) Valur	1–2	0–3	1–5
2026–27	UEFA Champions League	First qualifying round	(Georgia (country)) Iberia 1999	2–3	2–2	4–5
2026–27	UEFA Conference League	Second qualifying round	(Wales) The New Saints	1–0	0–1 (a.e.t.)	1–1 (4–2 p)
2026–27	UEFA Conference League	Third qualifying round	(Andorra) Inter Club d'Escaldes	0–4	0–2	0–6
2027–28	UEFA Conference League	First qualifying round				

=== UEFA coefficient ===
Correct as of 21 May 2025.

Rank	Team	Points
138	(Scotland) Heart of Midlothian F.C.	11.500
139	(Switzerland) Servette FC	11.500
140	(Estonia) FC Flora	11.500
141	(Belgium) K.R.C. Genk	11.370
142	(Belgium) Standard Liège	11.370
