= Antal Mally =

Hungarian football coach

Antal Mally (or Antal Maly; 21 September 1890 Budapest – 1958) was a Hungarian football coach.

1927 and 1935 he was the team manager of Estonian national football team. Besides Estonia, he coached also teams in Italy (US Triestina, A.C. Venezia, A.S. Siracusa, SS Catania) and Czechoslovakia (Považska Bystrica, AC Sparta, ŠK Žilina, FC Rimavska Sobota).
