= Tele2 Eesti =

Company based in Estonia

Tele2 Eesti AS
- Industry: telecommunications
- Founded: 1995
- Headquarters: Tallinn, Estonia
- Products: mobile communications, internet services

Tele2 Eesti AS (formerly Ritabell) is a telecommunications company registered in Estonia and owned by the Swedish company Tele2. It was founded in 1995. The main office of the company is located in Tallinn.

== History ==
On 23 August 1993, radio engineers Tõnis Palts (later mayor of Tallinn) and Toomas Peek founded the telecommunications company AS Levicom. It operated as a cable television operator and mobile phone dealer. On 2 June 1995, Levicom and the Swedish telecommunications company Millicom International Cellular (controlled by the Kinnevik group) established a joint venture AS Ritabell (52% owned by Levicom, 48% by Millicom). In December, Ritabell obtained a GSM license. During this time, Levicom and Millicom also participated in obtaining a GSM license in Latvia. In February 1996, Ritabell announced that it would form the third GSM network in Estonia alongside Eesti Mobiiltelefon (EMT, now Telia Eesti) and Radiolinja (now Elisa). In September, a contract was signed with Siemens as the main equipment supplier. In March 1997, Ritabell began network testing. On 28th April, Ritabell launched a mobile phone network under the Q GSM brand. At that time, EMT had approximately 53 thousand subscribers, and Radiolinja — 11.5 thousand. The new operator started to conquer the market with attractive and cheaper prices and service packages. At the end of the year, Q GSM covered Estonia's biggest cities and main roads. On October 1, 1998, the deal was completed with the sale of Millicom's 48% stake in Ritabell to Sweden's NetCom Systems AB (later NetCom AB, now Tele2 AB) for $50 million. On 22 January 1999, AS Levicom was renamed AS Levicom Cellular. On January 29, NetCom AB agreed with Levicom International Holdings BV (it owned the companies Levicom Cellular and Levicom Broadband) on the purchase of 90% of the capital shares of Levicom Cellular, as well as Levicom Broadband (a cable television operator in Estonia and Lithuania, a provider of fixed telephone communications and Internet services in Estonia) 19.9% purchase of capital shares; the transaction totaled $58.6 million. NetCom thus acquired 94.8% direct and indirect control of Ritabell.

On January 19, 2000, the name of JSC Levicom Cellular was changed to JSC Tele2 Holding. On 16 February 2001, the parent company in Sweden, NetCom AB, changed its name to Tele2 AB, and on 20 April, AS Ritabell was renamed Tele2 Eesti AS. The mobile network brand Q GSM was changed to Tele2. In May 2004, the cable television operators in Estonia owned by Tele2 were sold to the market leader Starman. On July 12, Tele2 acquired the remaining 10% capital share of Tele2 Holding AS.
