= 1985 Estonian SSR Football Championship =

Estonian SSR Higher League
- Season: 1985
- Champions: Pärnu Kalakombinaat/MEK; 1st title

The 1985 Estonian SSR Football Championship was won by Pärnu Kalakombinaat/MEK.

== League table ==
Pos	Team	Pld	W	D	L	GF	GA	GD	Pts
1	Pärnu Kalakombinaat/MEK (C)	22	19	2	1	54	13	+41	40
2	Zvezda	22	18	1	3	71	14	+57	37
3	Jõhvi Estonia Kaevandus	22	13	5	4	54	17	+37	31
4	Kohtla-Järve Keemik	22	12	3	7	48	24	+24	27
5	Norma	22	12	1	9	51	34	+17	25
6	Tempo	22	8	7	7	49	30	+19	23
7	Tallinna KK Majak	22	8	2	12	26	45	−19	18
8	Sillamäe Kalev	22	6	6	10	41	46	−5	18
9	Pärnu KEK	22	6	5	11	26	51	−25	17
10	FK Viljandi	22	5	6	11	34	45	−11	16
11	Narva Baltika (R)	22	3	3	16	24	66	−42	9
12	Dvigatel (R)	22	1	1	20	12	105	−93	3

(C) Champions; (R) Relegated
