= 1994–95 Estonian Cup =

Estonian football competition

Eesti Karikas

Tournament details
- Country: Estonia
- Teams: 24

Final positions
- Champions: Flora (1st title)
- Runners-up: Lantana-Marlekor

Tournament statistics
- Matches played: 29
- Goals scored: 144 (4.97 per match)

The 1994–95 Estonian Cup (Estonian: Eesti Karikas) was the fifth season of the Estonian football knockout tournament. Originally, winners of the cup qualified for the 1995–96 UEFA Cup Winners' Cup qualifying round. The defending champion, Norma, was knocked out in the quarter-final against Narva Trans.

The competition culminated with the final held at Kadriorg Stadium, Tallinn on 22 June 1995 with Flora taking the title 2–0. Since the Flora also win the 1994–95 Meistriliiga, the cup runners-up Lantana-Marlekor were qualified for the UEFA Cup Winners' Cup.

All in all, 24 teams took part of the competition.

== First round ==
Team 1	Score	Team 2
Belta	3–5	Sport Põltsamaa
Viljandi MSK	2–1	Kespo Kehtna
Muuga Sadam	1–0	Merkuur
Kärdla Linnameeskond	2–12	Tallinna Jalgpallikool
Lokomotiiv Valga	0–3	FC Lelle
Järvamaa	1–4	Kopli
Tervis Pärnu	3–2	Dünamo
Tulevik	3–1	Vall

== Second round ==
Team 1	Score	Team 2
Viljandi MSK	0–8	JK/Kalev Pärnu
Kopli	0–10	Lantana-Marlekor
Tervis Pärnu	0–2	Norma
Tulevik	7–0	DAG Tartu
Muuga Sadam	0–7	Flora
FC Lelle	0–1	Eesti Põlevkivi Jõhvi
Tallinna Jalgpallikool	0–6	Tallinna Sadam
Sport Põltsamaa	1–9	Narva Trans

== Quarter-finals ==
Team 1	Agg.	Team 2	1st leg	2nd leg
JK/Kalev Pärnu	2–14	Lantana-Marlekor	0–6	2–8
Flora	6–2	Eesti Põlevkivi Jõhvi	4–2	2–0
Tallinna Sadam	8–2	Tulevik	4–1	4–1
Norma	1–3	Narva Trans	1–1	0–2

== Semi-finals ==
Team 1	Agg.	Team 2	1st leg	2nd leg
Tallinna Sadam	0–6	Flora	0–3	0–3
Lantana-Marlekor	3–1	Narva Trans	2–1	1–0

== Final ==
22 June 1995

Flora	2–0	Lantana-Marlekor
Kristal 59'; Zdančius 72'

Kadriorg Stadium, Tallinn
Attendance: 600
Referee: Jüri Saar
