= Janno Kivisild =

Estonian football coach (born 1977)

Personal information
- Full name: Janno Kivisild
- Date of birth: 5 August 1977 (age 49)
- Place of birth: Kohila, Estonia

Team information
- Current team: Estonia (assistant manager)

Managerial career
- Years: Team
- 2000–2003: Valga
- 2004–2005: Flora
- 2006–2007: Kazakhstan (assistant)
- 2010–2012: Flora (assistant)
- 2010–: Estonia (assistant)

Janno Kivisild (born 5 August 1977) is an Estonian football coach. He is currently an assistant manager of the Estonia national football team. He holds a UEFA Pro License.
