= Estonian Football Association =

Sports governing body in Estonia

UEFA
- Founded: 14 December 1921
- Headquarters: Tallinn
- FIFA affiliation: 1923
- UEFA affiliation: 1992
- President: Aivar Pohlak (2007–)
- Website: jalgpall.ee

The Estonian Football Association (EJL; Estonian: Eesti Jalgpalli Liit) is the governing body of football, futsal, and beach soccer in Estonia. Established on 14 December 1921, it organizes the football league, including the championship which is called Meistriliiga, Estonian Cup and the Estonian national football team. It is based in Tallinn. EJL became a member of FIFA in 1923 but was disbanded during the occupation of Estonia by the Soviet Union; during this time the Estonian SSR Football Federation (Estonian: Eesti NSV Jalgpalliföderatsioon) organized Estonian football. It became a member of FIFA once again in 1992, following Estonia regaining its independence.

== Background ==
In the early 20th century, all sports in Estonia were governed by the Estonian Sports Association Kalev. Following success at the 1920 Summer Olympics, the Estonian Sports Association announced they were unable to continue to administer all sports in Estonia due to an increase in the number of sports being played. The Estonian Football Association was founded in 1921 as one of the first independent sports governing bodies in order to administer football in the country. The Estonian Football Association affiliated with FIFA in 1923. Following the occupation of Estonia by the Soviet Union in the Second World War in 1940, the Estonian Football Association was dissolved.

During the Estonian Soviet Socialist Republic, football was administered by the Soviet Estonian SSR Football Federation as a regional football governing body under the Football Federation of the Soviet Union. During this time, local Estonians were dissuaded from playing football so the majority of football under communist rule was played by Russians living in Estonia.

The Estonian Football Association was reformed in 1988, following the Estonian Declaration of Sovereignty, and rejoined FIFA in 1991. In 1992, they joined UEFA and re-established the Meistriliiga as the Estonian national football league.

Due to UEFA broadcasting agreements in the 2020s, the Estonian Football Association are usually required to kick-off national team home games at 21:45 EET, usually resulting in having to negotiate every match with European broadcasters to bring kick-off times earlier.

== Controversy ==
In 2017, FIFA fined the Estonian Football Association 30,000 Swiss francs (26,000 euros) and gave them a warning because of an incident where Bosnia and Herzegovina fans threw burning material onto the field.
