= Marko Lelov =

Estonian footballer

Personal information
- Full name: Marko Lelov
- Date of birth: 21 November 1973 (age 52)
- Place of birth: Pärnu, then part of Estonian SSR, Soviet Union
- Height: 1.79 m (5 ft 10 1/2 in)
- Position: Midfielder

Senior career*
Years	Team	Apps	(Gls)
1990–1992	Pärnu Kalakombinaat/MEK		
1992–1995	Tervis Pärnu	22	(1)
1995–1996	Flora	6	(0)
1996–1997	Lelle	13	(0)
1997–2003	Tulevik	120	(12)
1997	→ Nyköpings BIS (loan)	8	(0)
1998	→ Vimmerby IF (loan)		

International career
1995	Estonia U19	3	(0)
1994–1995	Estonia U21	10	(0)
1994–1995	Estonia	3	(0)

Managerial career
- 2004: Tulevik (assistant)
- 2004: Elva
- 2005–2010: Tulevik
- 2005: Estonia U21 (assistant)
- 2006–2007: Estonia U21
- 2009–2012: Estonia U21 (assistant)
- 2012–2013: Flora
- 2014: Estonia U18
- 2014–2016: Estonia U19
- 2014–2016: Pärnu Linnameeskond
- 2017: Vaprus
- * Club domestic league appearances and goals

Marko Lelov (born 21 November 1973) is an Estonian football manager and former professional player.

Lelov played as a midfielder for Pärnu Kalakombinaat/MEK, Tervis Pärnu, Flora, Lelle, Tulevik, Nyköpings BIS and Vimmerby IF, and made three appearances for the Estonia national team.

== International career ==
Lelov made his debut for Estonia on 29 July 1994, in a 0–3 loss against Lithuania in a 1994 Baltic Cup match.
