= 1999 in Estonian football =

- Meistriliiga champions
- FC Levadia Tallinn
- Esiliiga champions
- FC Kuressaare
- Estonian Cup winners
- FC Levadia Tallinn
- Estonian Super Cup winners
- FC Levadia Tallinn
- Teams in Europe
- FC Flora Tallinn; JK Tulevik Viljandi; FC Levadia Tallinn
- Estonian national team
- 2000 UEFA Euro qualifying
- Estonian Footballer of the Year
- Andres Oper

The 1999 season was the eighth full year of competitive football (soccer) in Estonia since gaining independence from the Soviet Union on 20 August 1991.

== National Leagues ==
=== Meistriliiga ===
Pos	Team	Pld	W	D	L	GF	GA	GD	Pts	Qualification or relegation
1	Levadia (C)	28	23	4	1	77	12	+65	73	Qualification for Champions League first qualifying round
2	Tulevik	28	16	5	7	57	34	+23	53	Qualification for UEFA Cup qualifying round
3	Flora	28	13	8	7	60	33	+27	47	Qualification for UEFA Cup qualifying round
4	Narva Trans	28	11	7	10	40	28	+12	40	Qualification for Intertoto Cup first round
5	TVMK	28	7	9	12	16	33	−17	30	
6	Lantana	28	6	9	13	31	52	−21	27	
7	Lelle	28	5	9	14	25	45	−20	24	Qualification for relegation play-offs
8	Eesti Põlevkivi Jõhvi (R)	28	2	7	19	12	81	−69	13	Relegation to Esiliiga

Source: rsssf.com
(C) Champions; (R) Relegated

=== Esiliiga ===
Pos	Team	Pld	W	D	L	GF	GA	GD	Pts	Promotion or relegation
1	Kuressaare (P)	28	21	4	3	92	25	+67	67	Promotion to Meistriliiga
2	Lootus (P)	28	21	2	5	81	33	+48	65	Qualification for promotion play-offs
3	Vigri	28	18	6	4	70	28	+42	60	
4	Valga	28	11	2	15	34	59	−25	35	
5	M.C.	28	9	4	15	39	73	−34	31	
6	FC Maardu	28	8	6	14	47	59	−12	30	Qualification for relegation play-offs
7	FC Lelle (R)	28	5	2	21	26	75	−49	17	Relegation to II Liiga
8	Sillamäe (R)	28	5	2	21	26	62	−36	17	Relegation to II Liiga

Source: rsssf.com
Rules for classification: 1) points; 2) head-to-head points; 3) head-to-head goal difference; 4) head-to-head goals scored; 5) goal difference; 6) number of goals scored.
(P) Promoted; (R) Relegated

== Estonian FA Cup ==
=== Final ===
25 May 1999

Levadia Maardu	3–2	Tulevik
O'Konnel-Bronin 17'; Gussev 52'; Krõlov 75'		Ustritski 15'; Allas 68'

Valga linnastaadion, Valga
Attendance: 500
Referee: Jüri Saar

== Estonian Super Cup ==
6 November 1999

Levadia Maardu	4–1	Flora

Kadrioru staadion, Tallinn

== National Team ==
Date	Venue	Opponents	Score	Comp	Estonia scorers	Fixture
1999-01-18	Ramat Gan Stadium; Ramat Gan	Israel	7 – 0	F		—
1999-01-22	Hapoel Umm al-Fahm F.C. Umm al-Fahm	Norway	3 – 3	F	Reim 75' (pen.); Zelinski 82' 89'	—
1999-03-03	Stadionul Dinamo; Bucharest	Romania	2 – 3	F		—
1999-03-06	Neo GSZ Stadium; Larnaca	Azerbaijan	2 – 2	F	Viikmäe 46'; Saviauk 71'	—
1999-03-16	Neo GSZ Stadium; Larnaca	Cyprus	1 – 2	F	Zelinski 59'; Terehhov 85'	—
1999-03-31	Žalgiris Stadium; Vilnius	Lithuania	1 – 2	ECQ	Terehhov 49' 77'	—
1999-06-05	Kadrioru Stadium; Tallinn	Czech Republic	0 – 2	ECQ		—
1999-06-09	Kadrioru Stadium; Tallinn	Lithuania	1 – 2	ECQ	Oper 8'	—
1999-08-18	Pärnu Kalevi Stadium; Pärnu	Armenia	2 – 0	F	Kristal 79'; Ustritski 90'	—
1999-09-04	Tórsvøllur; Tórshavn	Faroe Islands	0 – 2	ECQ	Reim 88'; Piiroja 90'	—
1999-09-08	Kadrioru Stadium; Tallinn	Scotland	0 – 0	ECQ		—
1999-10-09	Kadrioru Stadium; Tallinn	Bosnia and Herzegovina	1 – 4	ECQ	Oper 4'	—
1999-10-30	Al Jazira Stadium; Abu Dhabi	Iraq	1 – 1	F	Mahmoud 27' (o.g.)	—
1999-11-01	Al Jazira Stadium; Abu Dhabi	United Arab Emirates	2 – 2	F	Reim 19' (pen.); Oper 38'	—
1999-11-03	Al Jazira Stadium; Abu Dhabi	Turkmenistan	1 – 1	F	Viikmäe 47'	—
1999-12-18	Trikala Stadium; Trikala	Greece	2 – 2	F	Oper 20' 41'	—
