= Tallinn derby =

Football match between FC Flora and FCI Levadia

Tallinna derbi
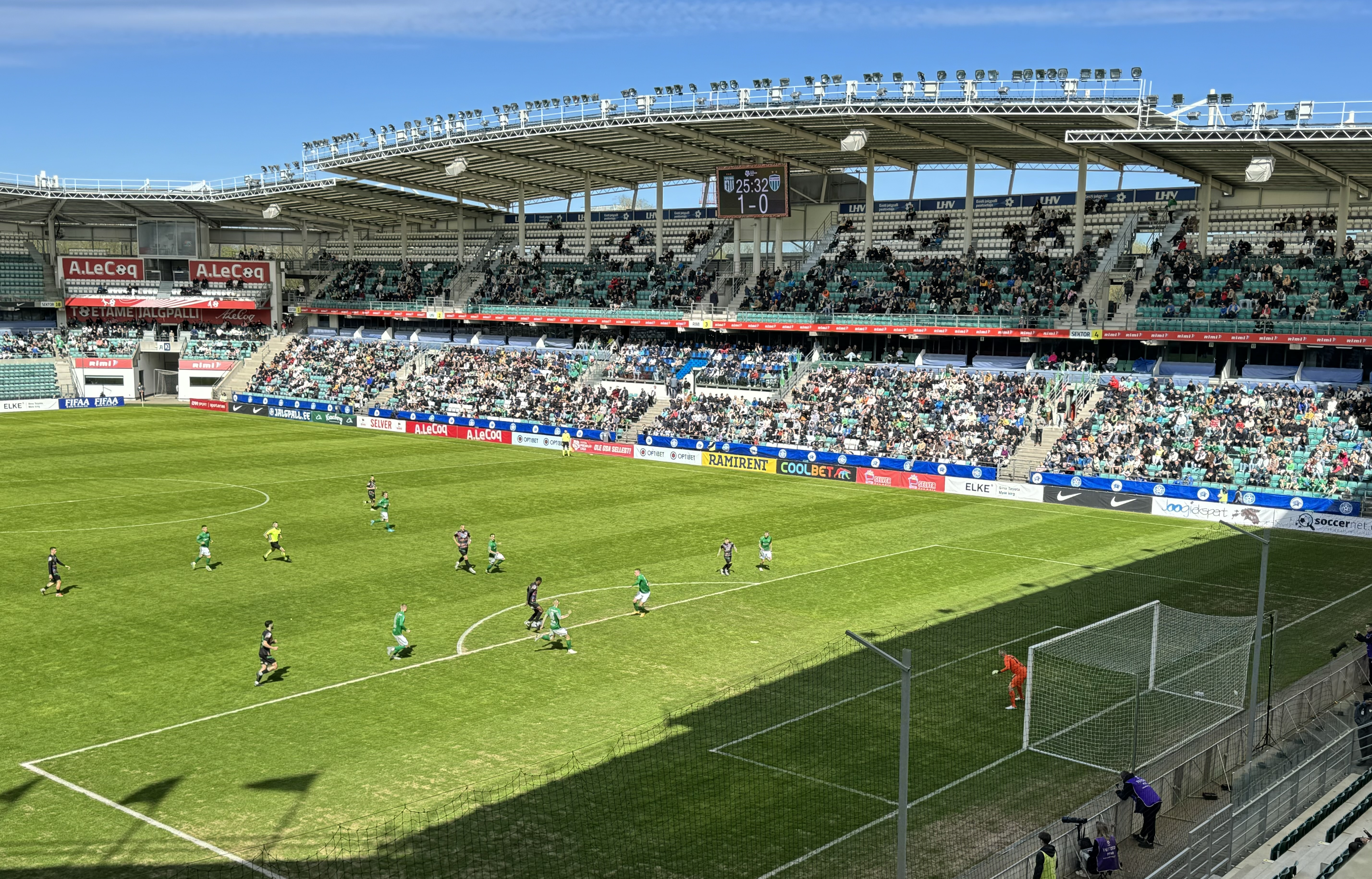
- 100th Tallinn derby on 5 May 2024
- Native name: Tallinna derbi
- Location: Tallinn, Estonia
- Teams: Flora; Levadia
- First meeting: 28 April 1999; Estonian Cup; Levadia 1–1 Flora
- Stadiums: A. Le Coq Arena; Sportland Arena (during winter)

Statistics
- Most player appearances: Rauno Alliku (57)
- Top scorer: Konstantin Nahk; Rauno Sappinen (11)

The Tallinn derby (Estonian: Tallinna derbi) is the name given to a football rivalry between FC Flora and FCI Levadia, two clubs based in Tallinn, the capital of Estonia. First contested in 1999, the fixture is considered to be the fiercest rivalry in Estonian football, with Flora and Levadia being the two biggest and most successful football clubs in the country.

Although Levadia was originally founded in Maardu, the club moved to Tallinn in 2000 and officially affiliated themselves with the capital city in 2004. Since 2019, the two clubs share their home ground A. Le Coq Arena. During winter and early spring months, the matches take place at Sportland Arena, as natural grass grounds are not playable during the period due to the region's harsh winter climate.

In the past, language and nationality were also one of the separating factors between the two clubs, as Levadia was seen as the club of choice for the Russian-speaking population of the city and Flora for the Estonian-speaking. While Flora has remained to represent Estonian nationalism and only plays with Estonian players, Levadia is no longer affiliated with Russian-speaking culture and is more of an international club, often relying on international players on the pitch. Thus, the cultural divide between the two clubs has diminished significantly.

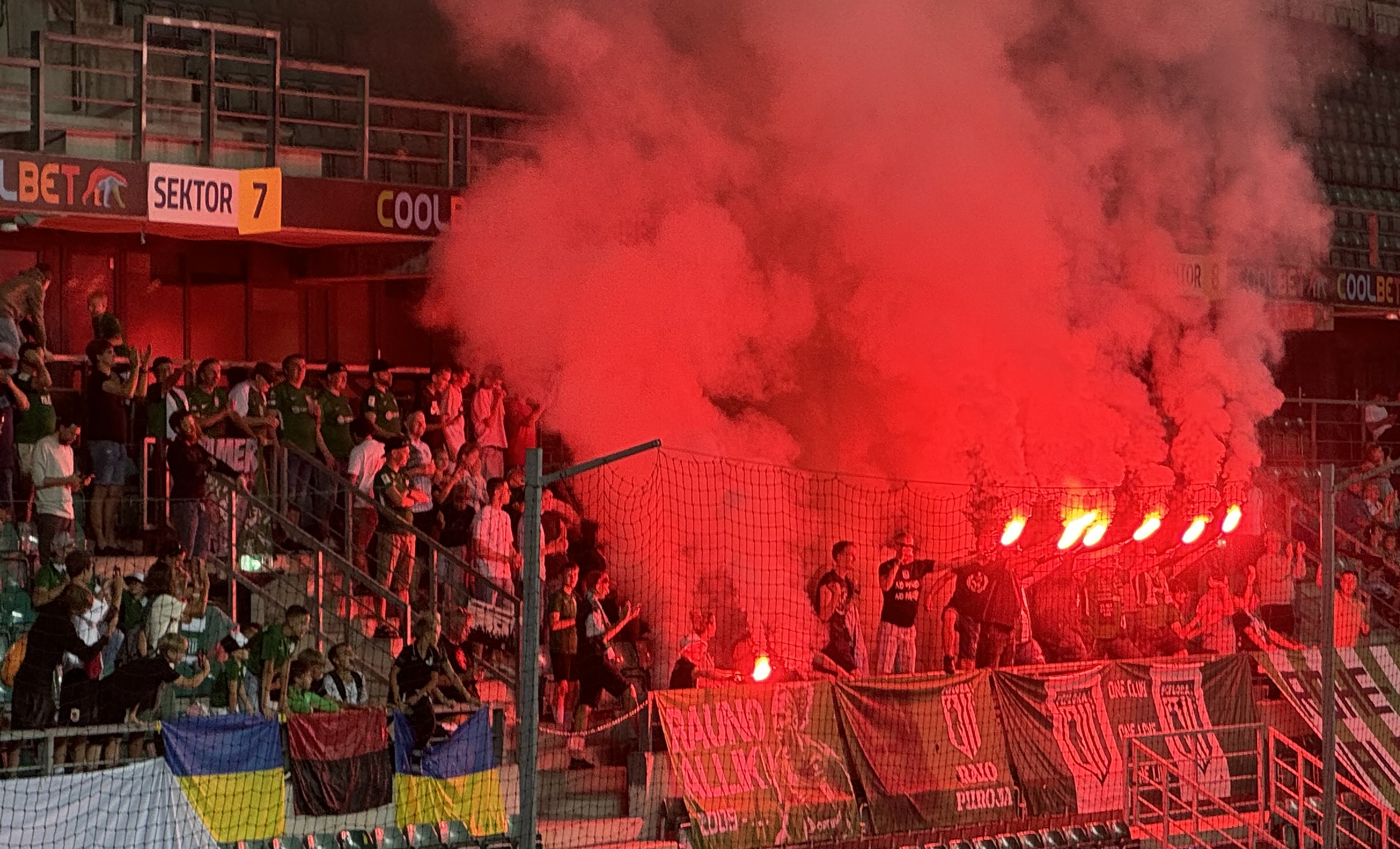
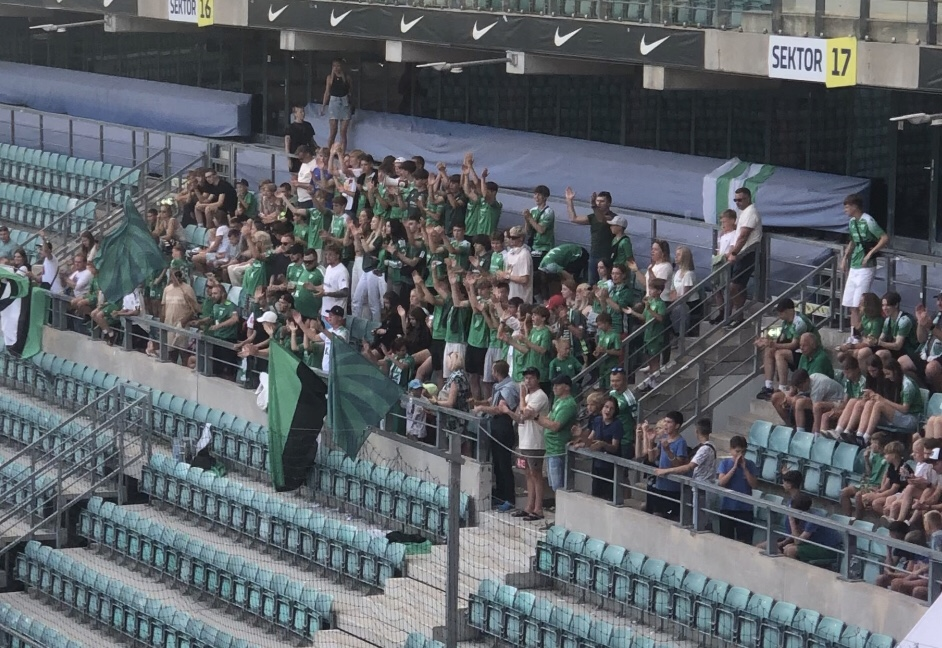
As the two clubs share their stadium, Flora ultras traditionally occupy the stadium’s southern end (lõunatribüün) while Levadia fans occupy the northern end (põhjatribüün).

== History ==
=== Background ===
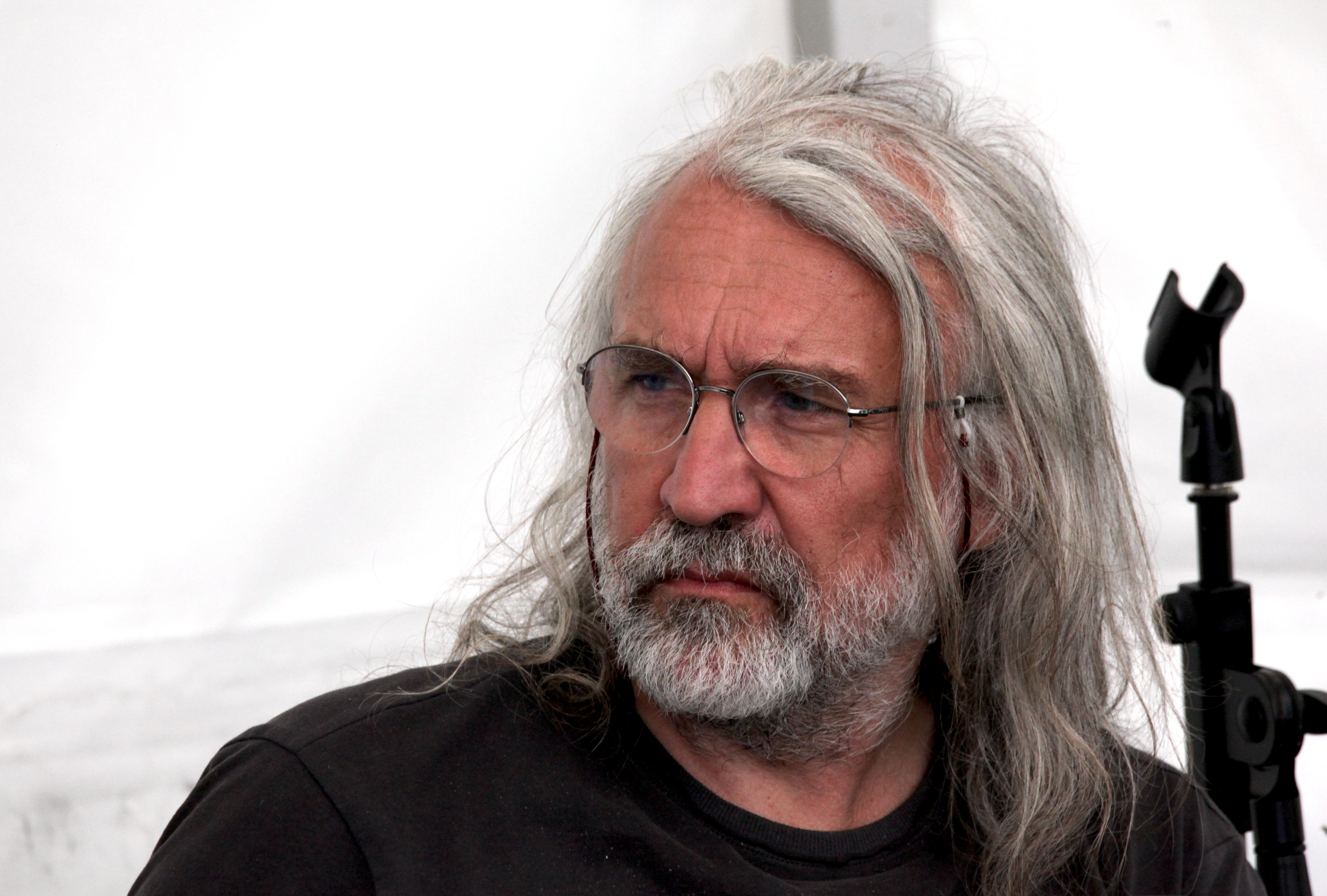

"Flora tries to be successful through their Estonian football culture aim (player policy), while Levadia tries to be successful"

— Aivar Pohlak, founder of Flora, on the difference between the two clubs

The history of the two clubs dates back to the 1990s, when Estonia had restored its independence (1991) after half a century long occupation under the Soviet Union, and began rebuilding its society. A rebuild also took place in Estonian football, where the nation had previously isolated themselves from the sport for 14 years. (Note: In 1969, Estonia desisted from participating in the Soviet Union championship, resulting in native Estonians desisting from practicing football and local championships being played by teams consisting of local Russians. Such isolation lasted for 14 years, making Estonia practically the only nation in the world where football was not played for such a long period of time.) FC Flora was founded in 1990 by Aivar Pohlak with the aim to restore and develop Estonian football and its culture through playing with native Estonian players, and soon the club established itself as the dominant force in the country. In October 1998, local Ukrainian steel industry businessman Viktor Levada founded FC Levadia in Tallinn's majority Russian-speaking suburb Maardu, and the club quickly earned promotion to the top division. Contrary to Flora, Levadia began playing with mostly local Russian players, laying the groundwork for a cultural rivalry between the clubs.

=== Beginning of a rivalry ===
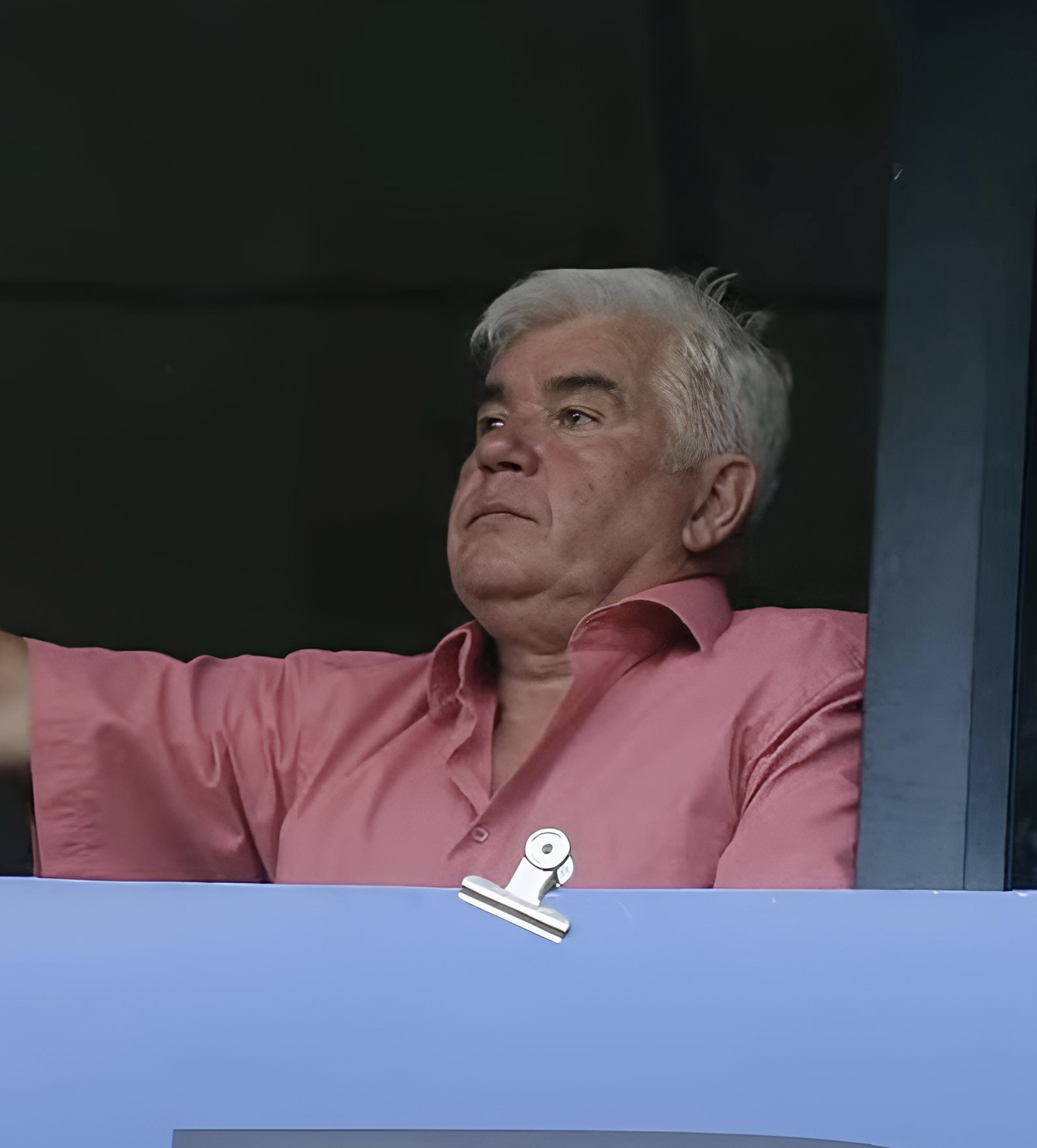

"For me, winning the derby is better than sex."

— Viktor Levada, founder and owner of Levadia

Despite being the league newcomers, Levadia were considered as one of the main title contenders against the reigning champions Flora already before the start of the 1999 season. The first match between the two teams took place on 28 April 1999 in Maardu, when hosts Levadia drew 1–1 with Flora in the Estonian Cup semi-final first leg. Their first meeting in Meistriliiga took place less than a month later, on 22 May 1999, when Levadia held the reigning champions Flora to a 0–0 draw. The season commenced with Levadia winning the treble. In 2000, Levadia moved to Kadriorg Stadium in Tallinn and officially affiliated themselves with the capital city in 2004.

In addition to the sporting rivalry, language and nationality also became one of the separating factors between the two clubs in the early 2000s. While Flora was seen as a club that represented Estonian nationalism, Levadia's creation coincided with the dissolution of FC Lantana, a club previously supported by Tallinn's Russian minority, resulting in Levadia becoming the club of choice for the Russian speaking population of the city. Since 2010s, that cultural divide between the two clubs has diminished significantly.

After the Russian invasion of Ukraine in 2022, Levadia have strongly voiced their support for Ukraine and the club's fan sector has grown to mostly be represented by local Ukrainians. In 2023, they also invited 70 Ukrainian soldiers training in Estonia to their decisive Tallinn derby match.

== Statistics ==
As of 11 August 2026.

Competition	Matches	Wins		Draws	Goals		Yellow/Red Cards	
Competition	Matches	FC Flora	Levadia	Draws	FC Flora	Levadia	FC Flora	Levadia
Premium Liiga	110	34	45	31	144	156	199	286

=== Player records ===
As of 11 August 2026. Active players currently playing for Flora or Levadia in bold.

Most appearances
Rank	Player	Club(s)	Games
1	(Estonia) **Rauno Alliku**	Flora	57
2	(Estonia) Vitali Leitan	Levadia	43
3	(Estonia) Gert Kams	Flora	42
4	(Estonia) Markus Jürgenson	Both clubs	38
5	(Estonia) Andrei Kalimullin	Levadia	37
5	(Estonia) Konstantin Nahk	Levadia	37

Most goals
Rank	Player	Club(s)	Goals
1	(Estonia) Konstantin Nahk	Levadia	11
1	(Estonia) **Rauno Sappinen**	Flora	11
3	(Estonia) Konstantin Vassiljev	Both clubs	9
3	(Estonia) Indrek Zelinski	Both clubs	9
5	(Estonia) Toomas Krõm	Levadia	8

=== Stadiums ===
As of 2024, the majority of the Tallinn derby league matches have been played at A. Le Coq Arena (over 40 matches). The two clubs also share Sportland Arena, the artificial turf stadium used during winter, which has hosted around 20 league derby matches. In addition to the two regular stadiums, 29 derby matches have been held at Kadriorg Stadium, five at Maarjamäe Stadium, three at Maarjamäe Stadium's artificial turf, two at Maardu linnastaadion, one at Männiku Stadium's artificial turf and one at Viimsi Stadium.
