= 1999 Meistriliiga =

Estonian national championships in football

Meistriliiga
- Season: 1999
- Champions: Levadia (1st title)
- Top goalscorer: Toomas Krõm (19)

The 1999 Meistriliiga was the ninth season of the Meistriliiga, Estonia's premier football league. Levadia won their first title.

== League table ==
Pos	Team	Pld	W	D	L	GF	GA	GD	Pts	Qualification or relegation
1	Levadia (C)	28	23	4	1	77	12	+65	73	Qualification for Champions League first qualifying round
2	Tulevik	28	16	5	7	57	34	+23	53	Qualification for UEFA Cup qualifying round
3	Flora	28	13	8	7	60	33	+27	47	Qualification for UEFA Cup qualifying round
4	Narva Trans	28	11	7	10	40	28	+12	40	Qualification for Intertoto Cup first round
5	TVMK	28	7	9	12	16	33	−17	30	
6	Lantana	28	6	9	13	31	52	−21	27	
7	Lelle	28	5	9	14	25	45	−20	24	Qualification for relegation play-offs
8	Eesti Põlevkivi Jõhvi (R)	28	2	7	19	12	81	−69	13	Relegation to Esiliiga

Source: rsssf.com
(C) Champions; (R) Relegated

=== Relegation play-off ===
6 November 1999

Lootus	0–3	Lelle

14 November 1999

Lelle	1–2	Lootus

Lelle won 4–2 on aggregate and retained their Meistriliiga spot; however, Lelle ceded their league entry to FC Valga both being associate clubs of Flora

== Results ==
Each team played every opponent four times, twice at home and twice on the road, for a total of 36 games.

=== First half of season ===
Home \ Away	JEP	FLO	LAN	LEL	LEV	TRS	TUL	TVM
Eesti Põlevkivi Jõhvi		1–6	1–3	0–0	0–5	1–0	1–2	1–0
Flora	4–0		3–0	2–2	1–2	5–0	5–2	0–1
Lantana	0–0	3–3		1–1	0–1	1–1	1–3	2–0
Lelle	0–0	1–0	4–2		1–1	0–3	0–1	0–2
Levadia	6–0	0–0	3–0	5–2		2–0	2–1	-:+ (Note: The game result (5–0) was cancelled because Levadia used a disqualified player Sergei Pareiko.)
Narva Trans	4–1	1–3	7–0	1–0	1–2		1–1	1–1
Tulevik	1–0	2–4	1–1	2–0	0–3	1–3		1–0
TVMK	0–0	1–1	0–2	3–0	0–3	0–0	0–4	

Legend: Blue = home team win; Yellow = draw; Red = away team win.

=== Second half of season ===
Home \ Away	JEP	FLO	LAN	LEL	LEV	TRS	TUL	TVM
Eesti Põlevkivi Jõhvi		0–1	1–4	0–0	1–9	0–4	0–2	0–0
Flora	7–1		3–1	2–1	0–3	1–1	1–1	1–1
Lantana	1–1	3–2		0–0	1–3	0–2	1–2	0–0
Lelle	3–1	0–1	1–1		1–5	1–0	2–4	0–0
Levadia	+:- (Note: The victory was awarded to Levadia, as the Eesti Põlevkivi Jõhvi did not show up.)	3–1	4–0	3–2		1–0	4–0	3–0
Narva Trans	2–0	1–1	2–0	1–0	0–0		2–0	0–1
Tulevik	14–0	1–0	3–2	3–0	0–0	3–1		0–0
TVMK	3–1	0–2	0–1	1–3	0–4	2–1	0–2	

Legend: Blue = home team win; Yellow = draw; Red = away team win.

== Top scorers ==
Rank	Player	Club	Goals
1	(Estonia) Toomas Krõm	Levadia	19
2	(Estonia) Andrei Krõlov	Levadia	18
3	(Estonia) Dmitri Ustritski	Tulevik	16
4	(Estonia) Vitali Leitan	Lantana	15
5	(Estonia) Indrek Zelinski	Flora	14
6	(Estonia) Maksim Gruznov	Narva Trans	13
7	(Estonia) Kristen Viikmäe	Flora	12
8	(Estonia) Aleksandr Marašov	Narva Trans	10
9	(Estonia) Konstantin Kolbasenko	Levadia	9
10	(Estonia) Indro Olumets	Levadia	8
