= 2000 Meistriliiga =

Estonian national championships in football

Meistriliiga
- Season: 2000
- Champions: Levadia (2nd title)
- Top goalscorer: Egidijus Juška (24); Toomas Krõm (24)

The 2000 Meistriliiga was the tenth season of the Meistriliiga, Estonia's premier football league. Levadia won their second title.

== League table ==
Pos	Team	Pld	W	D	L	GF	GA	GD	Pts	Qualification or relegation
1	Levadia (C)	28	23	5	0	88	20	+68	74	Qualification for Champions League first qualifying round
2	Flora	28	16	7	5	51	25	+26	55	Qualification for UEFA Cup qualifying round
3	TVMK	28	14	6	8	54	29	+25	48	Qualification for Intertoto Cup first round
4	Tulevik	28	12	9	7	45	34	+11	45	
5	Narva Trans	28	12	7	9	64	40	+24	43	Qualification for UEFA Cup qualifying round (Note: Qualified as 2000-01 Cup Winner)
6	Lootus	28	6	4	18	26	54	−28	22	
7	Kuressaare	28	5	4	19	25	68	−43	19	Qualification for relegation play-offs
8	Valga (R)	28	2	2	24	11	94	−83	8	Relegation to Esiliiga

Source: Estonian Football Association
Rules for classification: 1) points; 2) number of wins; 3) head-to-head points; 4) head-to-head goal difference; 5) head-to-head goals scored; 6) goal difference; 7) number of goals scored.
(C) Champions; (R) Relegated

=== Relegation play-off ===
5 November 2000

Tervis	n/p	FC Kuressaare

11 November 2000

FC Kuressaare	n/p	Tervis

Kuressaare were awarded the playoff after Tervis withdrew due to unavailability of players active for the Estonian U-18 team.

== Results ==
Each team played every opponent four times, twice at home and twice on the road, for a total of 36 games.

=== First half of season ===
Home \ Away	FLO	KUR	LEV	LOO	TRS	TUL	TVM	VAL
Flora		1–0	2–3	5–0	0–1	2–1	3–1	4–0
Kuressaare	2–3		1–5	0–2	0–2	1–5	1–6	2–0
Levadia	1–1	3–0		2–1	1–0	1–1	1–0	4–0
Lootus	1–3	1–1	0–3		0–2	0–1	0–1	4–0
Narva Trans	1–1	4–0	2–3	2–2		3–0	0–3	9–0
Tulevik	0–0	3–1	1–2	1–0	2–3		0–0	0–0
TVMK	2–2	1–2	1–2	5–0	1–2	1–2		2–0
Valga	0–3	3–0	0–6	1–4	1–1	0–2	0–1	

Legend: Blue = home team win; Yellow = draw; Red = away team win.

=== Second half of season ===
Home \ Away	FLO	KUR	LEV	LOO	TRS	TUL	TVM	VAL
Flora		3–0	1–2	1–0	2–0	2–2	2–2	3–0
Kuressaare	0–1		0–4	1–1	2–4	0–0	1–3	2–0
Levadia	3–1	8–1		6–0	2–2	1–1	2–1	8–0
Lootus	0–1	0–2	0–1		3–2	1–4	0–0	2–0
Narva Trans	1–2	1–1	2–2	2–3		4–1	0–3	6–0
Tulevik	0–0	1–0	1–4	2–1	4–3		2–2	5–0
TVMK	2–0	2–0	0–3	3–0	0–2	3–1		6–2
Valga	0–2	1–4	0–5	2–0	1–5	0–2	0–2	

Legend: Blue = home team win; Yellow = draw; Red = away team win.

== Top scorers ==
Rank	Player	Club	Goals
1	(Lithuania) Egidijus Juška	TVMK	24
1	(Estonia) Toomas Krõm	Levadia	24
3	(Estonia) Maksim Gruznov	Narva Trans	23
4	(Estonia) Indro Olumets	Levadia	13
4	(Latvia) Vitālijs Teplovs	TVMK	13
6	(Lithuania) Marius Dovydėnas	Tulevik	12
7	(Estonia) Sergei Bragin	Levadia	11
8	(Russia) Dmitri Lipartov	Narva Trans	10
8	(Estonia) Meelis Rooba	Flora	10
10	(Estonia) Dmitri Ustritski	Tulevik	9

== See also ==
- 2000 in Estonian football
