= 2000 in Estonian football =

- Meistriliiga champions
- FC Levadia Maardu
- Esiliiga champions
- FC Maardu
- Estonian Cup winners
- FC Levadia Maardu
- Estonian Super Cup winners
- FC Levadia Maardu
- Teams in Europe
- FC Levadia Maardu; JK Tulevik Viljandi; FC Flora Tallinn
- Estonian national team
- 2000 King's Cup; 2002 FIFA World Cup qualification
- Estonian Footballer of the Year
- Mart Poom

The 2000 season was the ninth full year of competitive football (soccer) in Estonia since gaining independence from the Soviet Union on 20 August 1991.

== National Leagues ==
=== Meistriliiga ===
Pos	Team	Pld	W	D	L	GF	GA	GD	Pts	Qualification or relegation
1	Levadia (C)	28	23	5	0	88	20	+68	74	Qualification for Champions League first qualifying round
2	Flora	28	16	7	5	51	25	+26	55	Qualification for UEFA Cup qualifying round
3	TVMK	28	14	6	8	54	29	+25	48	Qualification for Intertoto Cup first round
4	Tulevik	28	12	9	7	45	34	+11	45	
5	Narva Trans	28	12	7	9	64	40	+24	43	Qualification for UEFA Cup qualifying round (Note: Qualified as 2000-01 Cup Winner)
6	Lootus	28	6	4	18	26	54	−28	22	
7	Kuressaare	28	5	4	19	25	68	−43	19	Qualification for relegation play-offs
8	Valga (R)	28	2	2	24	11	94	−83	8	Relegation to Esiliiga

Source: Estonian Football Association
Rules for classification: 1) points; 2) number of wins; 3) head-to-head points; 4) head-to-head goal difference; 5) head-to-head goals scored; 6) goal difference; 7) number of goals scored.
(C) Champions; (R) Relegated

=== Esiliiga ===
Pos	Team	Pld	W	D	L	GF	GA	GD	Pts	Promotion or relegation
1	FC Maardu (P)	28	27	0	1	147	21	+126	81	Promotion to Meistriliiga
2	Tervis	28	16	3	9	63	34	+29	51	Qualification for promotion play-offs
3	Viljandi	28	12	4	12	31	46	−15	40	
4	M.C.	28	11	5	12	63	49	+14	38	
5	Dünamo	28	11	2	15	61	72	−11	35	
6	Merkuur	28	9	7	12	42	62	−20	34	Qualification for relegation play-offs
7	Muhumaa (R)	28	8	3	17	35	79	−44	27	Relegation to II Liiga
8	FC Lelle (R)	28	4	4	20	31	110	−79	16	Relegation to II Liiga

Source: rsssf.com
Rules for classification: 1) points; 2) head-to-head points; 3) head-to-head goal difference; 4) head-to-head goals scored; 5) goal difference; 6) number of goals scored.
(P) Promoted; (R) Relegated

== Estonian FA Cup ==
=== Final ===
28 May 2000

Levadia Maardu	2–0	Tulevik
Olumets 65'; Leetma 76'

Pärnu Kalevi staadion, Pärnu
Attendance: 500
Referee: Sten Kaldma

== Estonian Super Cup ==
4 November 2000

Levadia Maardu	2–1	Tulevik

Kuressaare Linnastaadion, Kuressaare

== National Team ==
Date	Venue	Opponents	Score	Comp	Estonia scorers	Fixture
2000-02-23	Rajamangala Stadium; Bangkok	Finland	4 – 2	KC	Zelinski 71' (pen.); Oper 84'	—
2000-02-25	Rajamangala Stadium; Bangkok	Thailand	2 – 2	KC	Reim 67' (pen.)	—
2000-04-26	Stade Josy Barthel; Luxembourg	Luxembourg	1 – 1	F	Oper 83'	—
2000-06-04	Kadrioru Stadium; Tallinn	Belarus	2 – 0	F	Oper 4' 82'	—
2000-06-11	Kadrioru Stadium; Tallinn	Georgia	1 – 0	F	Piiroja 17'	—
2000-08-16	Kadrioru Stadium; Tallinn	Andorra	1 – 0	WCQ02	Reim 64' (pen.)	—
2000-09-03	Kadrioru Stadium; Tallinn	Portugal	1 – 3	WCQ02	Oper 84'	—
2000-10-07	Estadi Comunal d'Aixovall; Andorra la Vella	Andorra	1 – 2	WCQ02	Reim 54'; Oper 65'	—
2000-10-11	Lansdowne Road; Dublin	Republic of Ireland	2 – 0	WCQ02		—
2000-11-15	Kuressaare Linnastaadion; Kuressaare	Kyrgyzstan	1 – 0	F	Anniste 15'	—
2000-12-10	Hong Kong Stadium; Hong Kong	Hong Kong	1 – 2	F	Zelinski 53' 58'	—
