= Lilleküla Stadium =

Football stadium in Tallinn, Estonia

Lilleküla Stadium A. Le Coq Arena
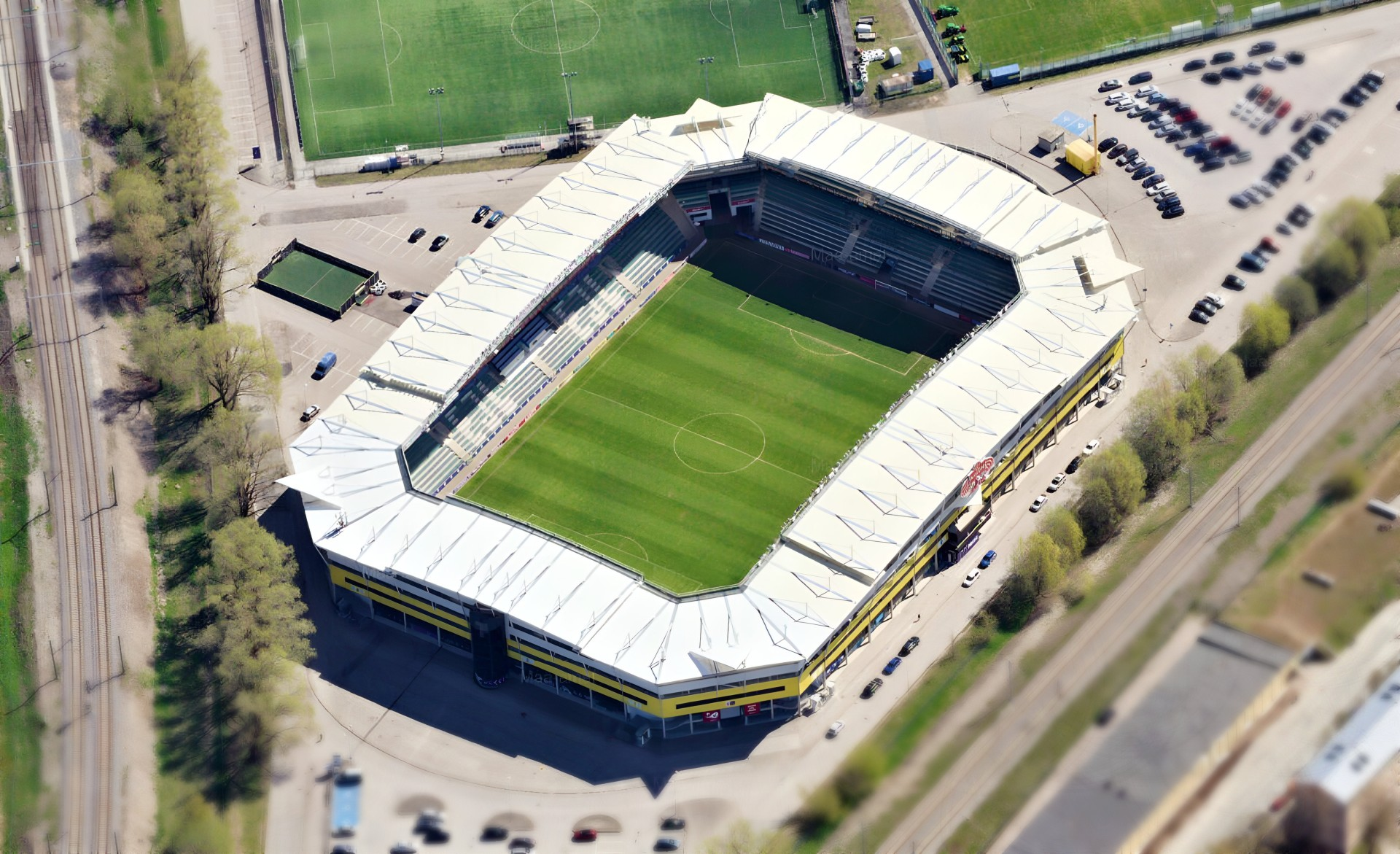
- UEFA
- Interactive map of Lilleküla Stadium; A. Le Coq Arena
- Address: Jalgpalli 21
- Location: Tallinn, Estonia
- Coordinates: 59°25′17″N 24°43′55″E
- Owner: Estonian Football Association
- Operator: Estonian Football Association
- Capacity: 14,336
- Field size: 105 by 68 metres (344 by 223 ft)

Construction
- Groundbreaking: 2000
- Opened: 2 June 2001; 25 years ago
- Expanded: 2016–2018
- Cost: 131 million EEK (2002)
- Architect: Haldo Oravas

Tenants
- FC Flora (2001–present); FCI Levadia (2019–present); Estonia national football team (2001–present): Major sporting events hosted; 2018 UEFA Super Cup; 2012 UEFA European U-19 Championship; 2026 UEFA European U-17 Championship

The Lilleküla Stadium, known as A. Le Coq Arena for sponsorship reasons, is a football stadium in Tallinn, Estonia. It is the home ground of football clubs Flora and Levadia, and the Estonia national football team. With a capacity of 14,336, it is the largest stadium in Estonia.

Opened in 2001 and expanded in 2018, Lilleküla Stadium has hosted the 2018 UEFA Super Cup, the 2012 UEFA European U-19 Championship and the 2026 UEFA European U-17 Championship.

== History ==
=== Construction and opening ===
The matter of building a national football stadium emerged in Estonia during the second half of the 1990s, when it became evident that Kadriorg Stadium could no longer comply with international football standards. The stadium project was led by FC Flora and in July 1998, the club submitted a planning application to Tallinn City Council, requesting permission to build a new stadium on wasteland between railway lines in Kitseküla, close to the border with neighbouring Lilleküla. Receiving the council's approval, Flora signed a 99-year lease on the estate and construction began in October 2000. The stadium was designed by Estonian architect Haldo Oravas.

The construction of the Lilleküla Stadium was seen as a grand race against time, as the stadium had to be completed by June 2001 in order to avoid Estonia having to play its World Cup qualification home matches either in Finland or Latvia. The media covered the state of the construction almost daily and the stadium received its permit on the day of Estonia's World Cup qualifying match against the Netherlands, with final seats being installed only hours before the kick-off.

The stadium was officially opened on 2 June 2001, with a 2002 FIFA World Cup qualification match between Estonia and the Netherlands. The match saw Estonia's Andres Oper become the first player to score at the new stadium when he scored in the 65th minute, with the full-time result being a 4–2 victory for the Netherlands.

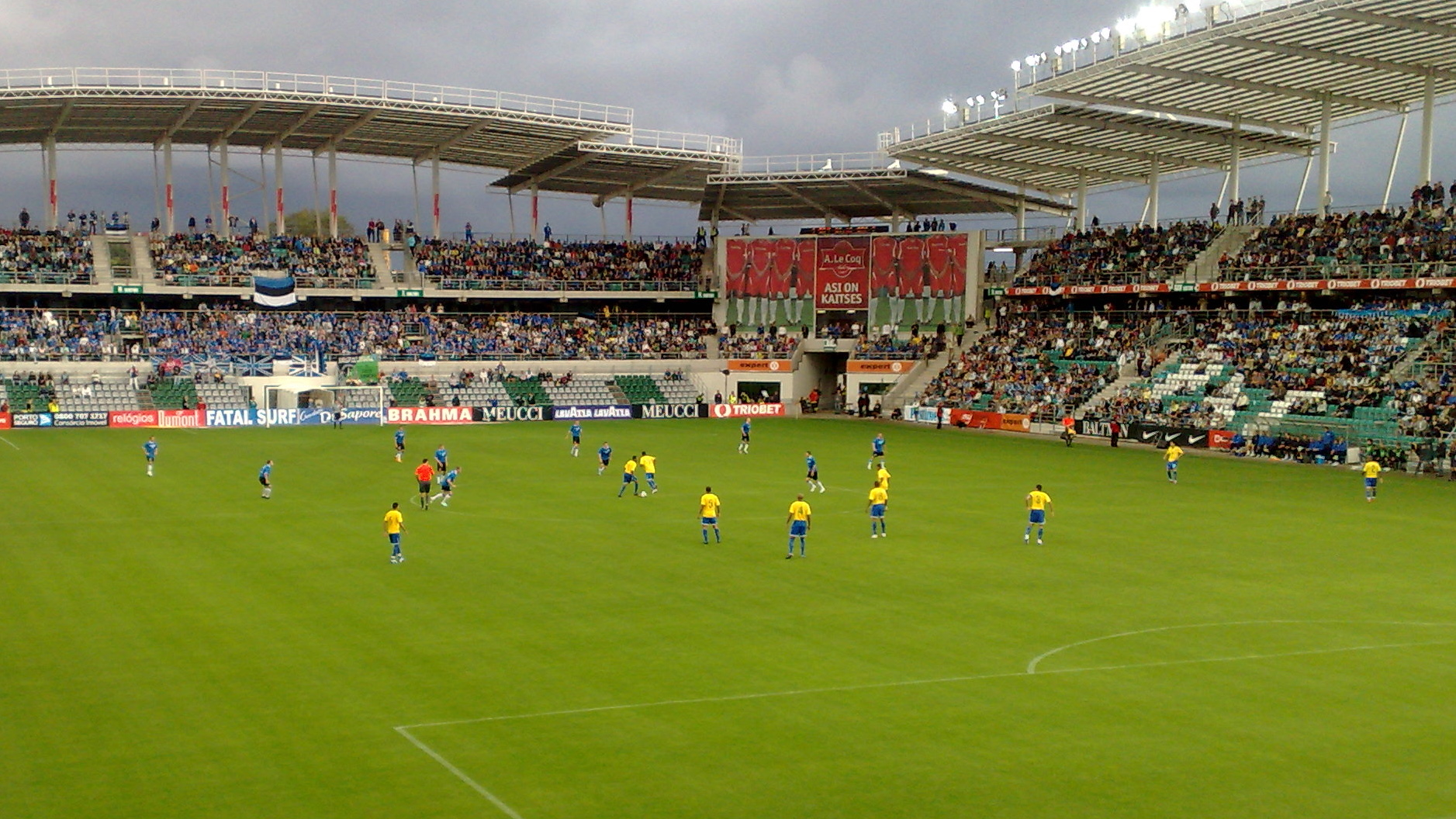
Lilleküla Stadium during Estonia friendly against Brazil in 2009

In January 2002, A. Le Coq bought the naming rights of the stadium. During the 2012 UEFA European Under-19 Championship, the stadium hosted six out of 15 tournament matches, including the final, which saw Spain defeat Greece 1–0.

In 2012, Flora completed the transfer ownership of the Lilleküla Football Complex, including Lilleküla Stadium, to the Estonian Football Association. The deal was later revealed to have been worth over €12 million.

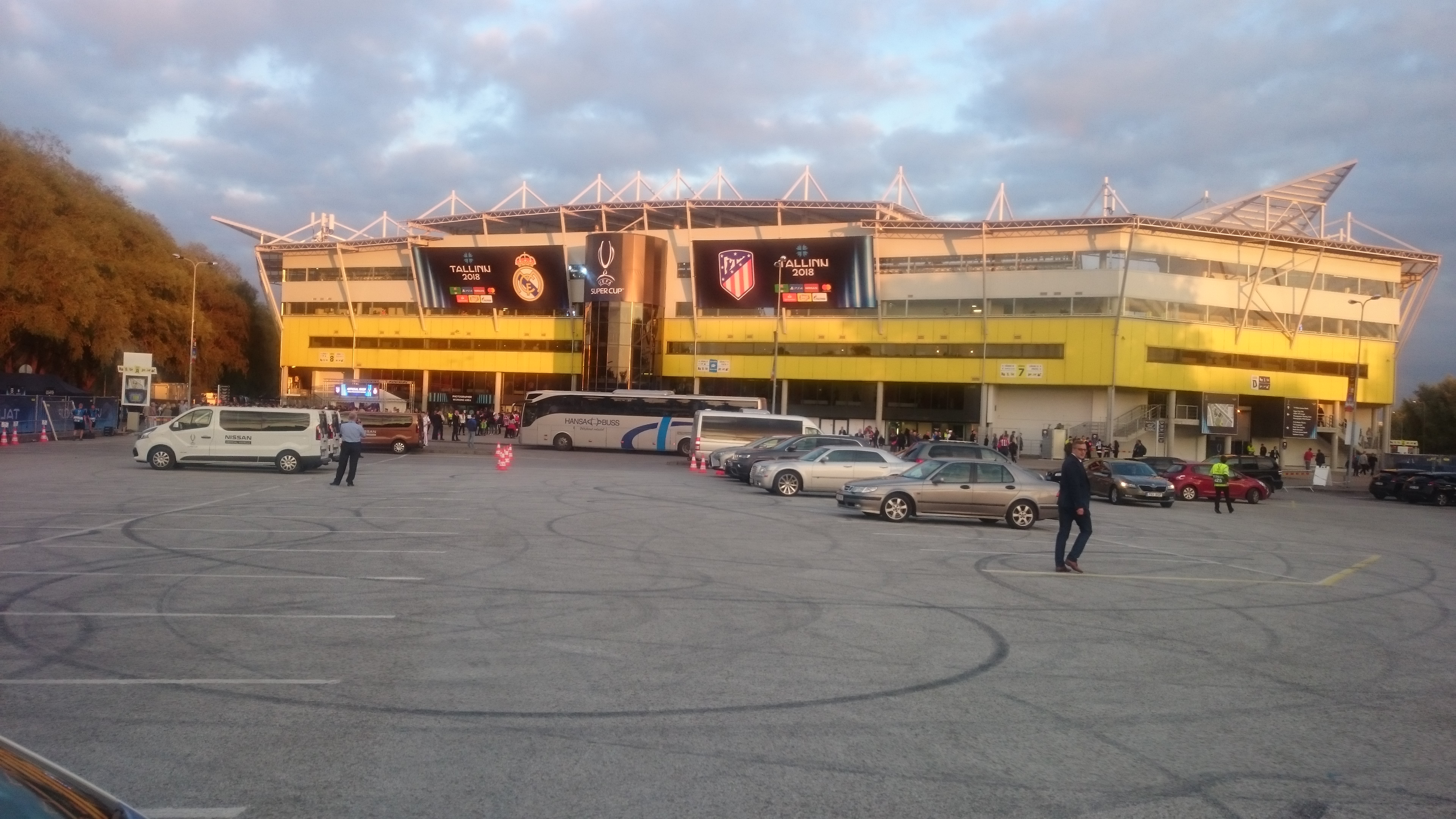
Lilleküla Stadium hosted the 2018 UEFA Super Cup match between Real Madrid and Atlético Madrid

=== Expansion and UEFA Super Cup ===
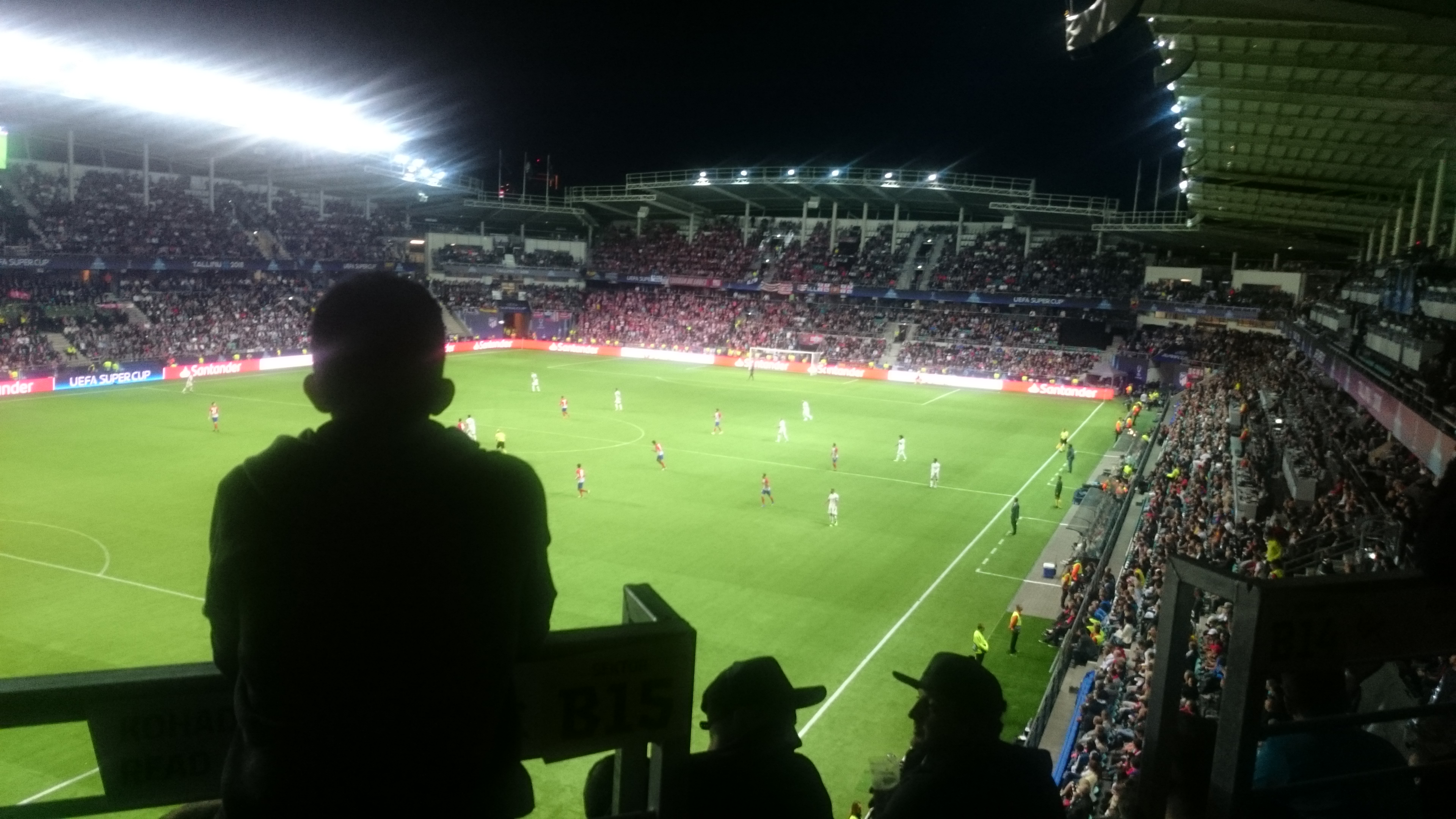
El Derbi Madrileño brought a record 12,424 people onto the stands

In September 2016, it was announced that the stadium would host the 2018 UEFA Super Cup. In preparation for the match, the stadium's capacity was increased from 10,340 to 14,336, with the total expansion cost of around €7 million. The 2018 UEFA Super Cup match between the 2017–18 UEFA Champions League winners Real Madrid and the 2017–18 UEFA Europa League winners Atlético Madrid was held on 15 August 2018, with Atlético Madrid winning 4–2 in extra time.

During the 2026 UEFA European Under-17 Championship, the stadium hosted five of the tournament's 15 matches, including the final, in which Italy defeated Belgium on penalties following a 1–1 draw in regular time.

== Lilleküla Football Complex ==
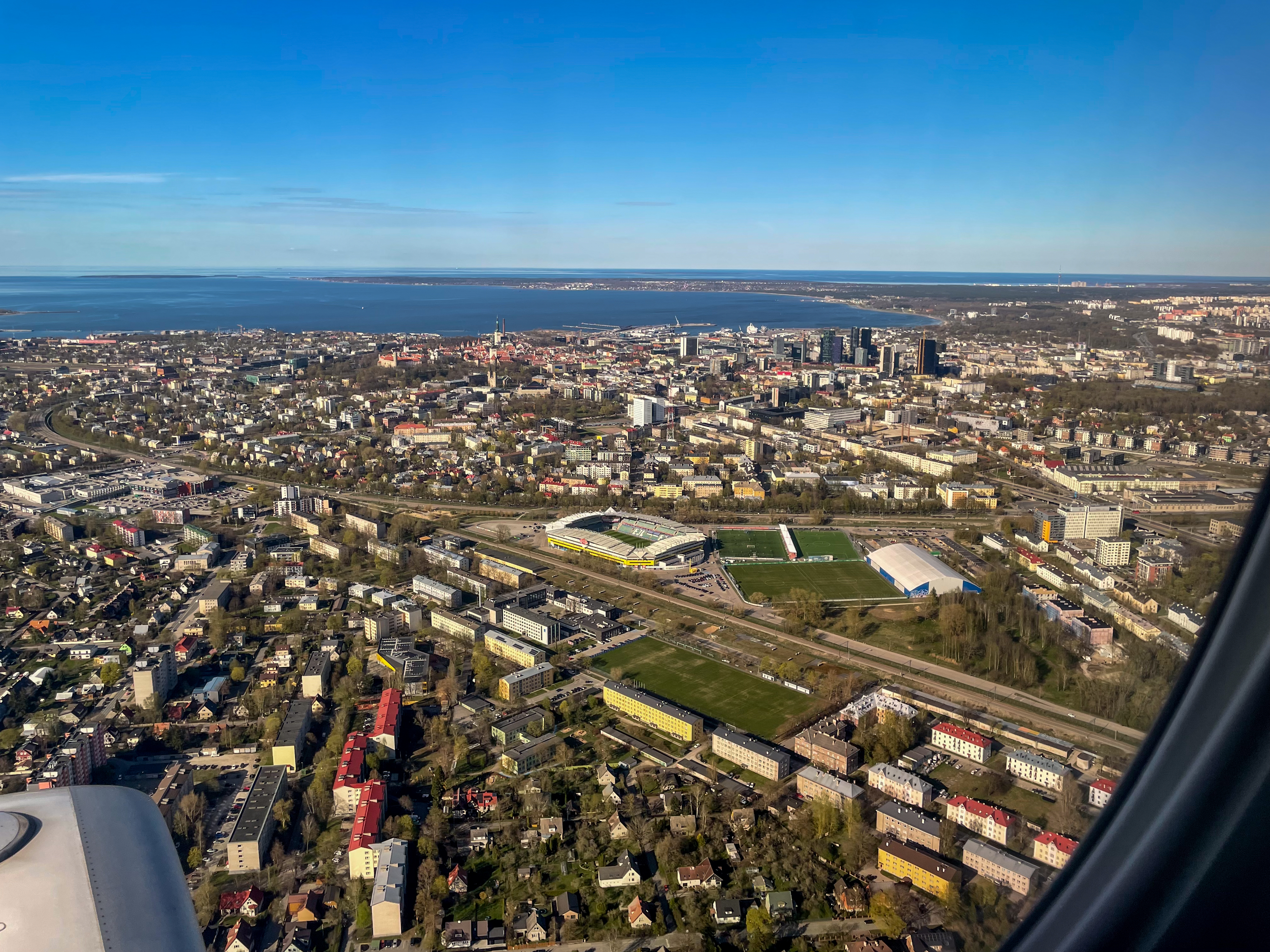
Lilleküla Football Complex as seen from above

Lilleküla Stadium is part of the Lilleküla Football Complex, which also includes two natural grass surface pitches, two artificial turf pitches of which one is the 1,198-seat Sportland Arena, and an indoor football hall named EJL Jalgpallihall.

== Concerts ==
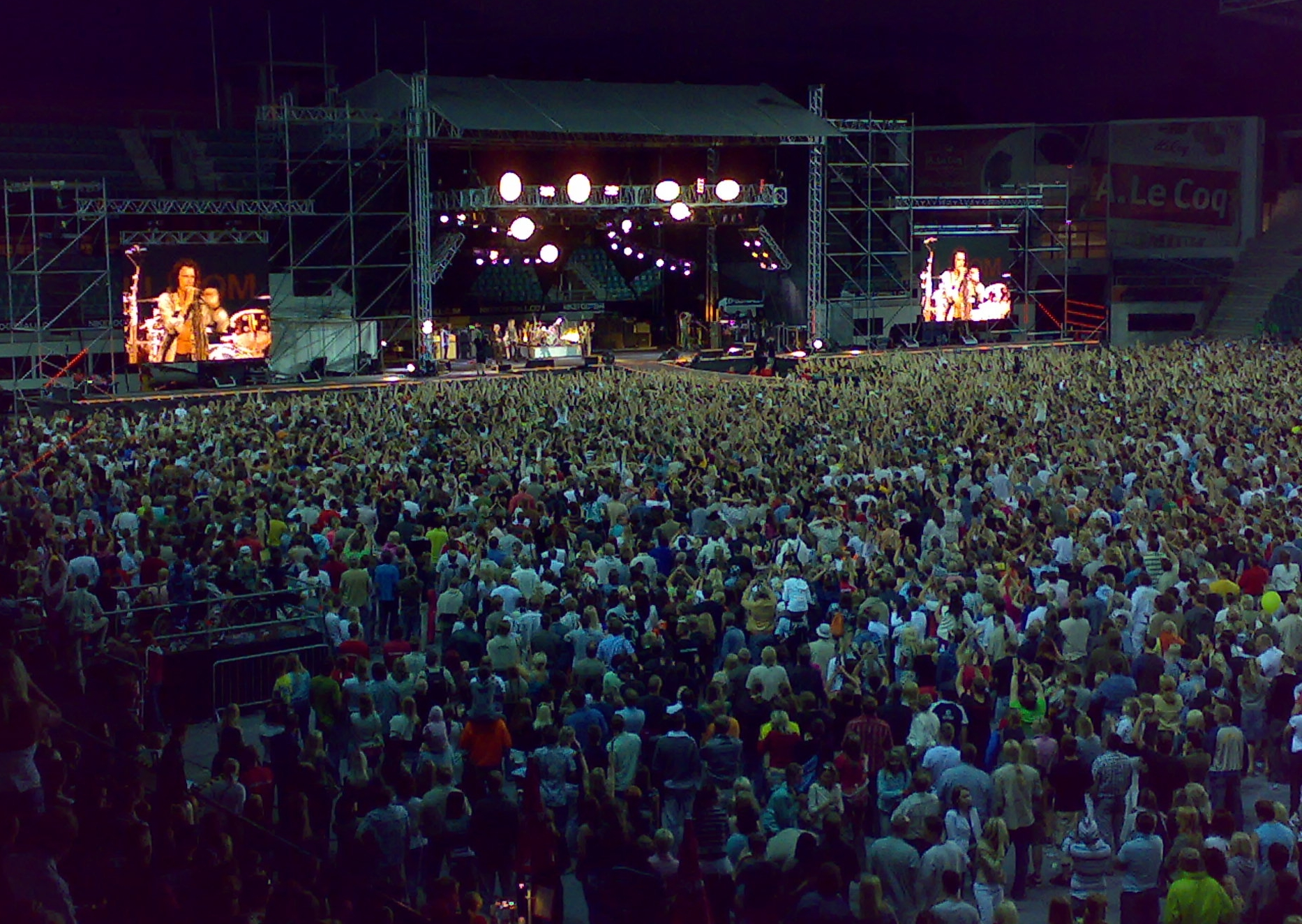
Aerosmith concert held at Lilleküla Stadium Arena in 2007

Aside from football and other sporting events, several concerts have been held at Lilleküla Stadium. Lenny Kravitz performed in 2005 and Aerosmith in 2007. In 2023, the stadium hosted the concert of NOËP and in 2024, the concert of Max Korzh.

== Gallery ==
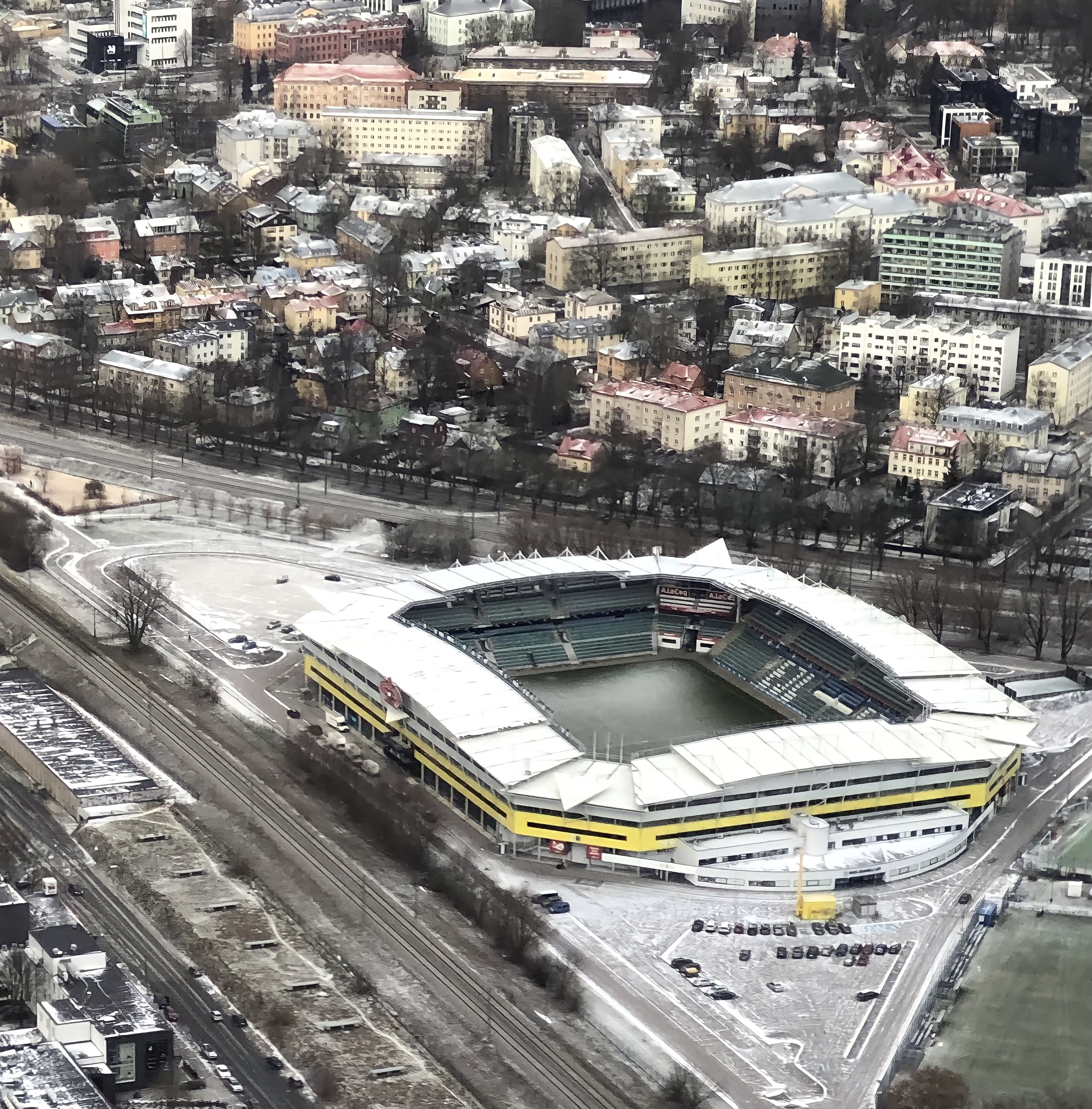
A. Le Coq Arena from above in the winter

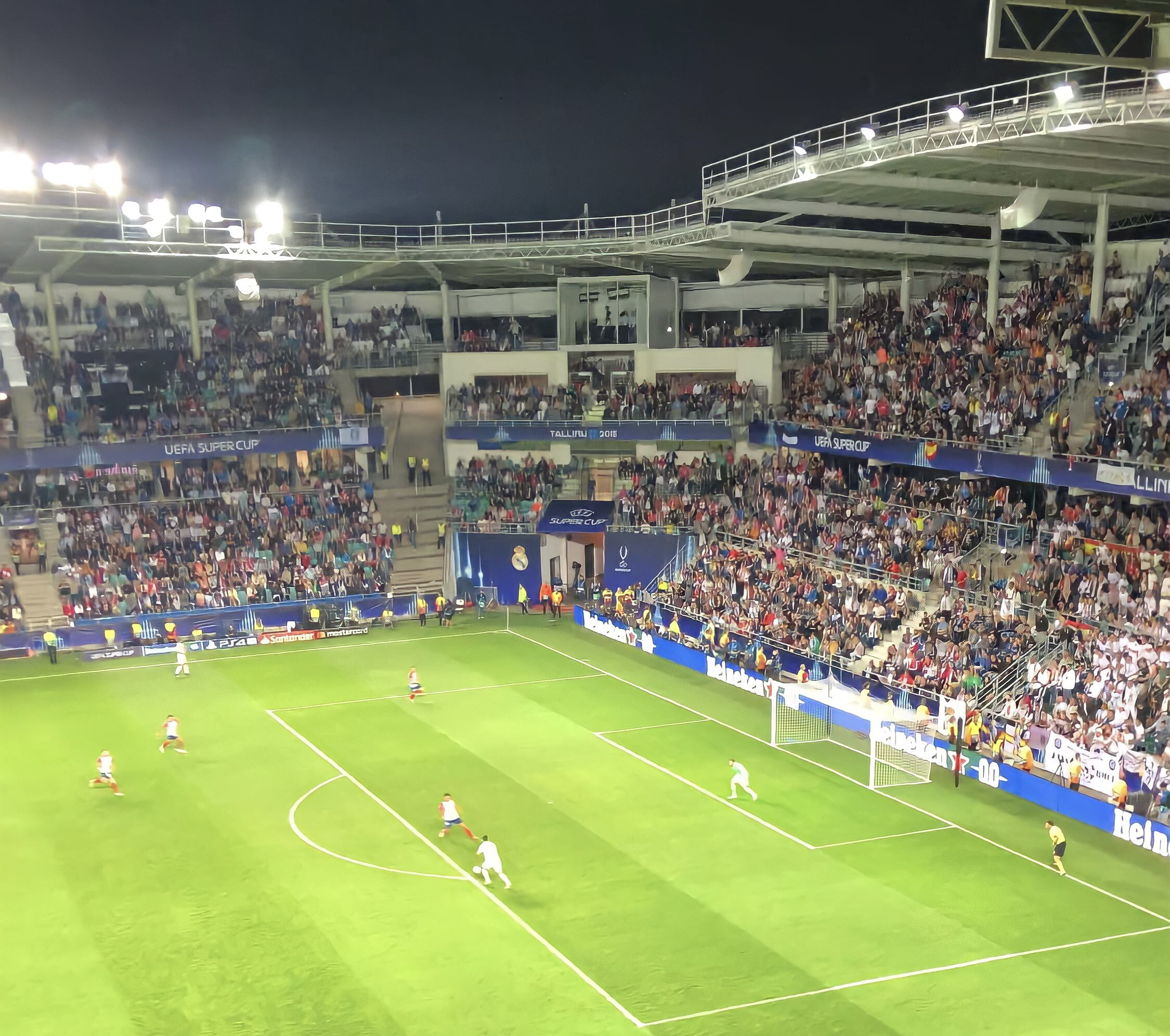
Real Madrid vs. Atlético Madrid in 2018

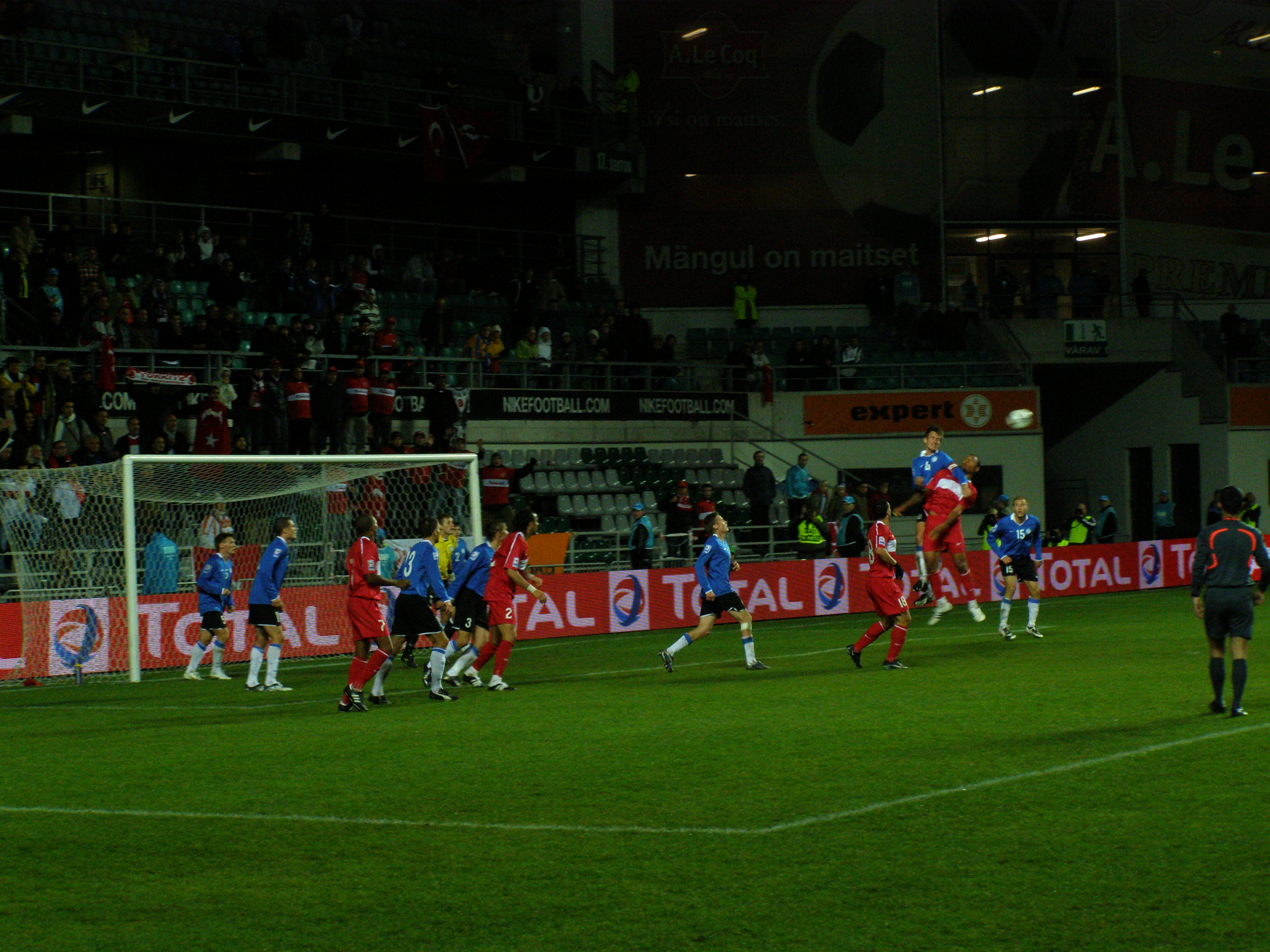
Estonia vs. Türkiye in 2008

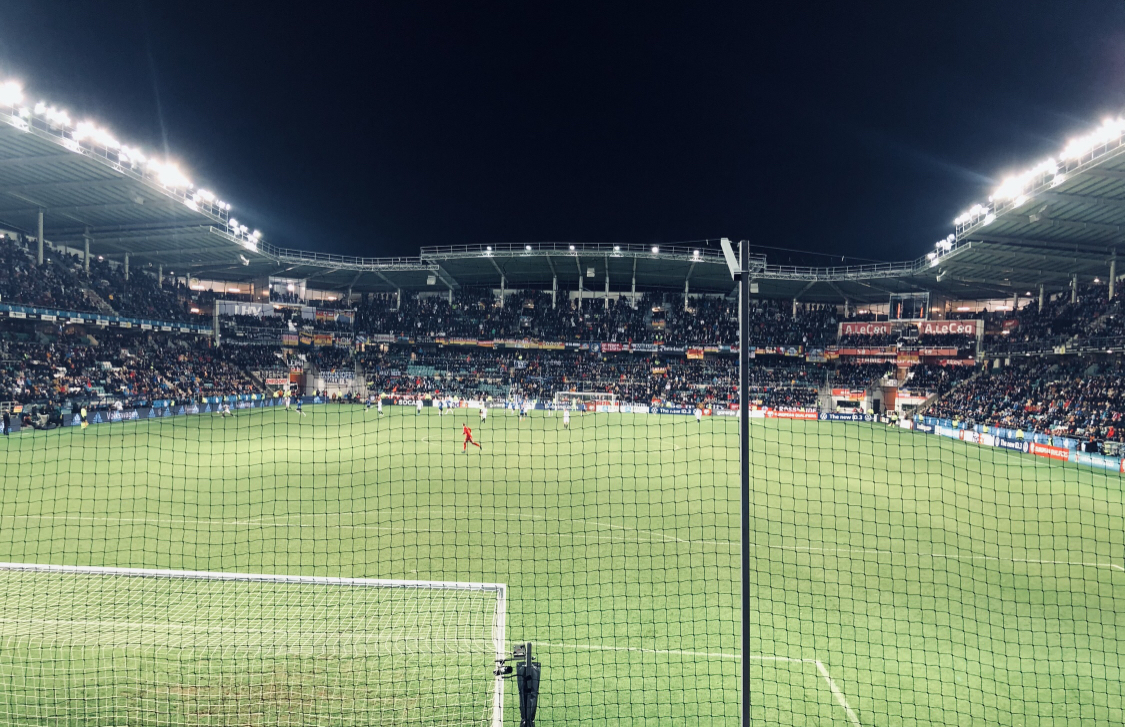
Estonia vs. Germany in 2019

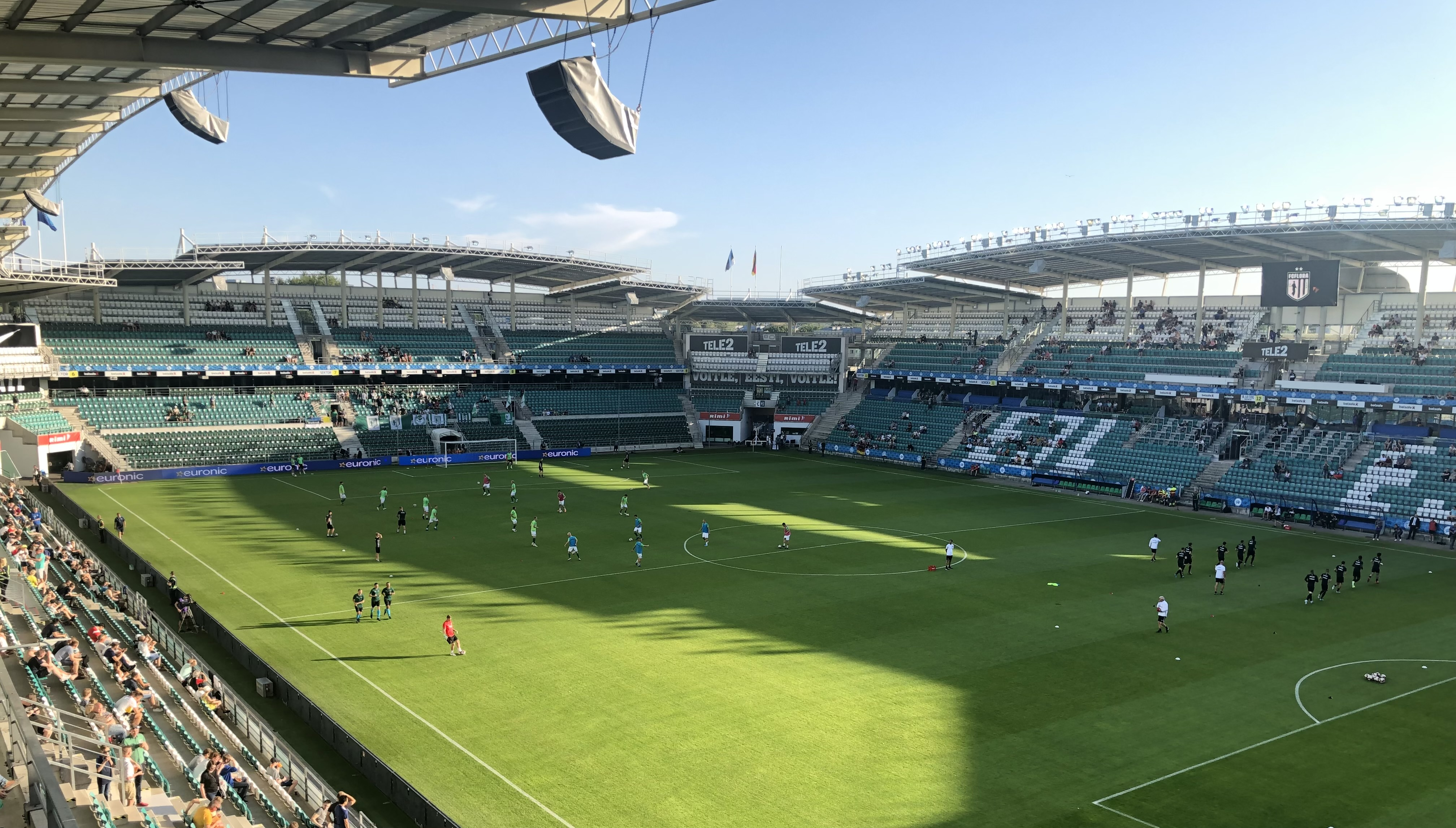
The stadium before Flora vs. Eintracht Frankfurt in 2019

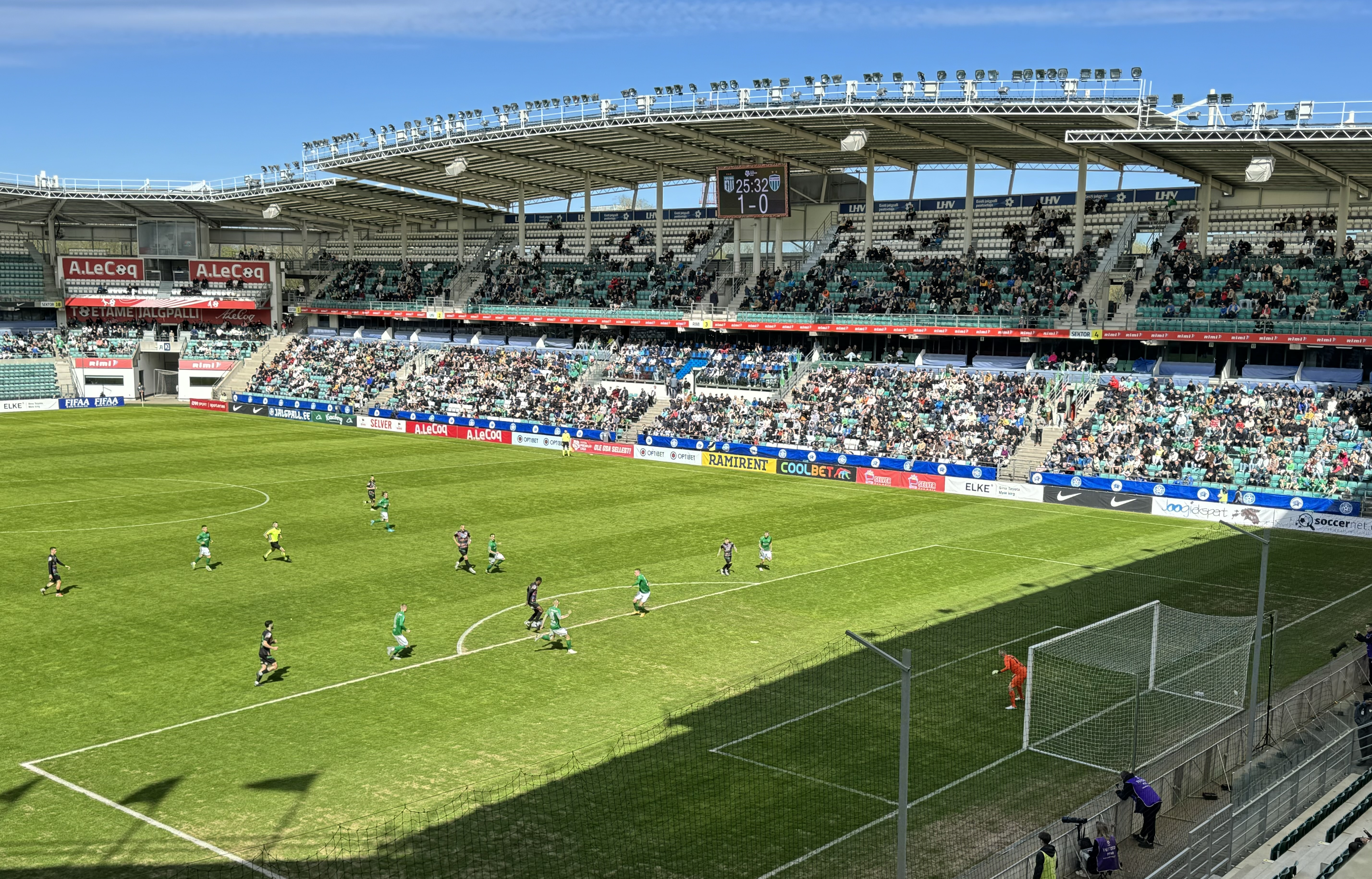
The stadium hosting the Tallinn derby

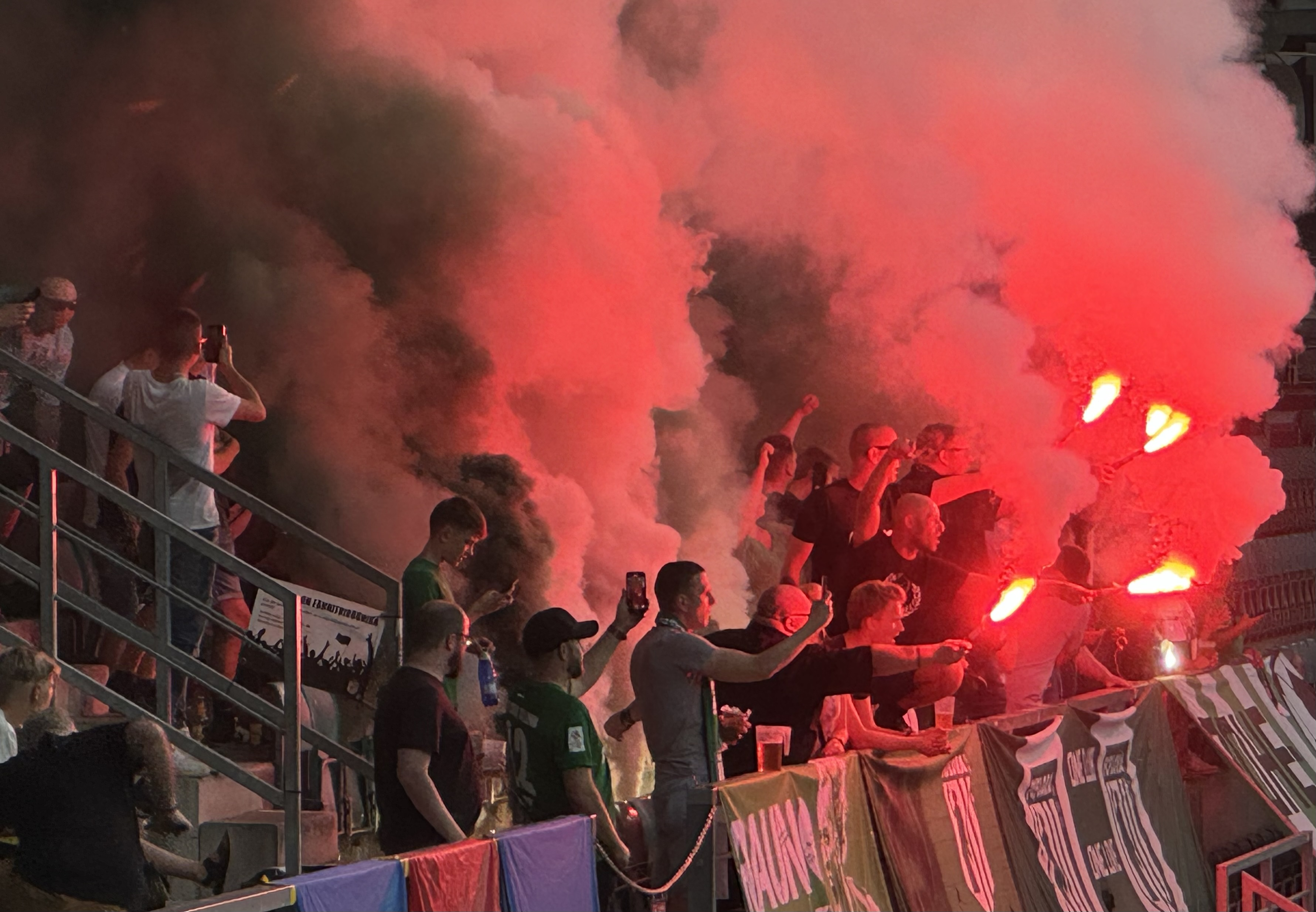
Flora ultras in the southern stand

Preceded by Philip II Arena; Skopje	UEFA Super Cup; Match venue 2018	Succeeded by Vodafone Park; Istanbul
