= 2000 Esiliiga =

Estonian football league season for second division

Esiliiga
- Season: 2000

The 2000 Esiliiga is the tenth season of the Esiliiga, second-highest Estonian league for association football clubs, since its establishment in 1992.

== Final table ==
Pos	Team	Pld	W	D	L	GF	GA	GD	Pts	Promotion or relegation
1	FC Maardu (P)	28	27	0	1	147	21	+126	81	Promotion to Meistriliiga
2	Tervis	28	16	3	9	63	34	+29	51	Qualification for promotion play-offs
3	Viljandi	28	12	4	12	31	46	−15	40	
4	M.C.	28	11	5	12	63	49	+14	38	
5	Dünamo	28	11	2	15	61	72	−11	35	
6	Merkuur	28	9	7	12	42	62	−20	34	Qualification for relegation play-offs
7	Muhumaa (R)	28	8	3	17	35	79	−44	27	Relegation to II Liiga
8	FC Lelle (R)	28	4	4	20	31	110	−79	16	Relegation to II Liiga

Source: rsssf.com
Rules for classification: 1) points; 2) head-to-head points; 3) head-to-head goal difference; 4) head-to-head goals scored; 5) goal difference; 6) number of goals scored.
(P) Promoted; (R) Relegated

== Promotion playoff ==
5 November 2000

Tervis	w/o	Kuressaare

11 November 2000

Kuressaare	w/o	Tervis

FC Kuressaare were awarded the playoff win after JK Tervis Pärnu withdrew due to unavailability of players active for the Estonian U-18 team. Kuressaare remained in Meistriliiga, Tervis in Esiliiga.

== Relegation playoff ==
5 November 2000

Unknown	–	Merkuur

11 November 2000

Merkuur	–	Unknown

== See also ==
- 2000 Meistriliiga
- 2000 in Estonian football
