= FCI Levadia Tallinn =

Association football club in Estonia

Levadia
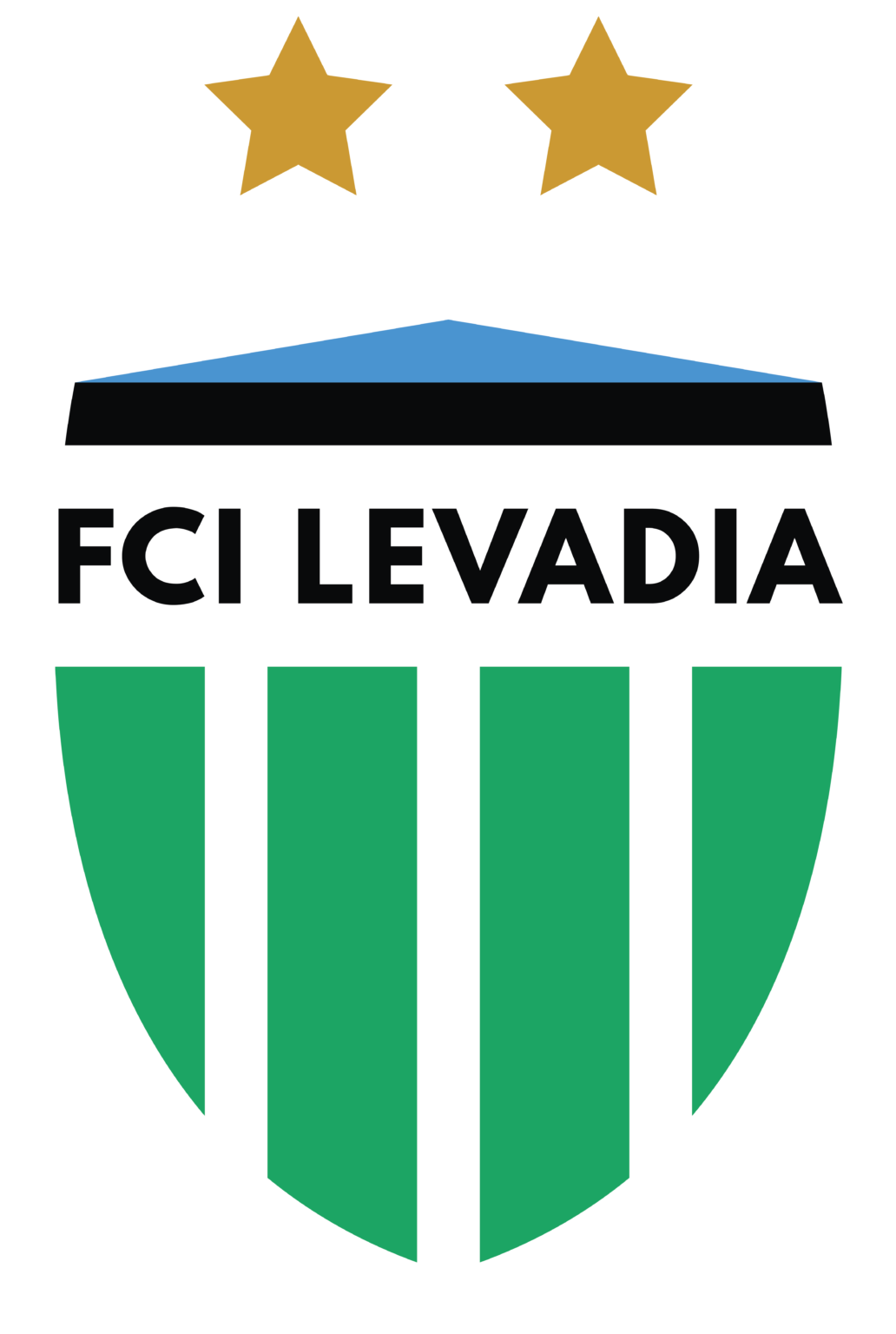
- Full name: Football Club Infonet Levadia Tallinn
- Founded: 22 October 1998; 28 years ago
- Ground: Lilleküla Stadium
- Capacity: 14,336
- President: Viktor Levada
- Head coach: Vjatšeslav Zahovaiko
- League: Meistriliiga
- 2026: Meistriliiga, 1st of 10 (champions)
- Website: fcilevadia.ee
Home colours	Away colours

Football Club Infonet Levadia Tallinn, commonly known as FCI Levadia, or simply as Levadia, is a professional football club based in Tallinn that competes in the Meistriliiga, the top flight of Estonian football. The club's home ground is Lilleküla Stadium.

Founded in 1998 in Maardu, the club moved to Tallinn in 2000 and officially affiliated themselves with the capital city in 2004. In 2017, Levadia's first team merged with FCI Tallinn, and became FCI Levadia. Levadia has played in the Meistriliiga since the 1999 season and have never been relegated from the Estonian top division. Levadia are the second most successful club in Estonian football with 32 domestic titles; including 12 Meistriliiga titles, a record 11 Estonian Cups and 9 Estonian Supercups.

== History ==
=== Foundation and immediate success (1998–2003) ===
Levadia was founded on 22 October 1998, when Viktor Levada's Levadia Group OÜ became the official sponsor of Maardu based Esiliiga club Olümp, which subsequently changed its name to Levadia. The club won the 1998 Esiliiga and were promoted to the Meistriliiga. Before the start of the season, Levadia merged with JK Tallinna Sadam to grant the club a place in the UEFA Cup through Sadam's European qualification. Led by head coach Sergei Ratnikov, Levadia immediately made a mark during their first season in top flight football in 1999, becoming the first team to win the Meistriliiga, the Estonian Cup and the Estonian Supercup in the same year.

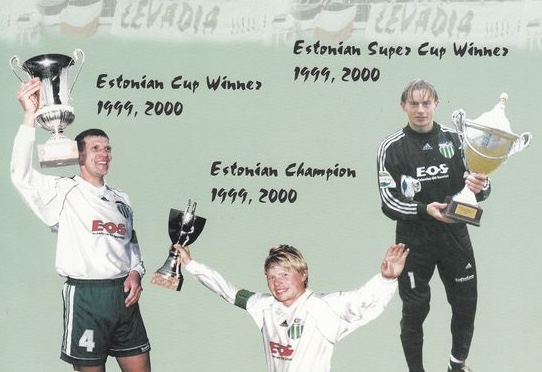
Levadia won back-to-back domestic trebles after entering the Meistriliiga in 1999

After the turn of the century, Levadia moved their home matches from Maardu to the Kadriorg Stadium and managed to repeat their success by winning another treble during the 2000 season, which included going unbeaten in the league. In the 2000–01 UEFA Champions League, Levadia defeated The New Saints 6–2 on aggregate in the first qualifying round, but lost to Shakhtar Donetsk 2–9 on aggregate in the second qualifying round. Following the loss to Shakhtar Donetsk, Ratnikov was sacked. In 2001, Valeri Bondarenko was appointed as a manager. Levadia failed to defend their title, finishing the 2001 season in third place and in November 2001, Bondarenko was replaced by Pasi Rautiainen. Under Rautiainen, Levadia finished the 2002 Meistriliiga as runners-up, only two points behind champions Flora. After the season, Rautiainen resigned and was replaced by Franco Pancheri in January 2003. Pancheri coached Levadia for just 9 Meistriliiga matches, before he was sacked in June 2003. He was replaced by Tarmo Rüütli and Levadia finished the 2003 season in third place.

=== Relocation to Tallinn and domestic dominance (2004–2016) ===
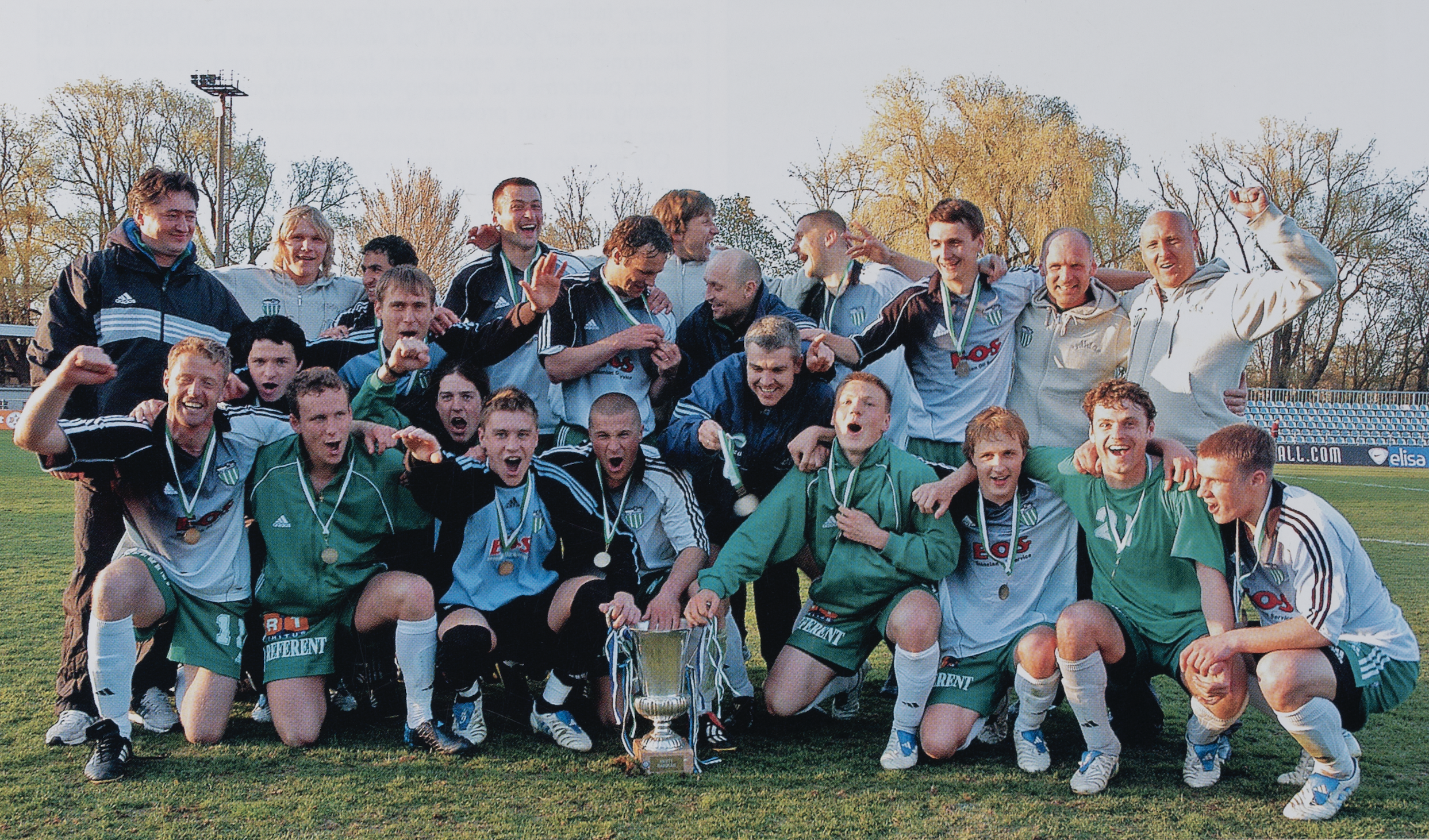
Levadia's 2006 squad is considered to be one of the strongest in Estonian club football history.

In 2004, Levadia officially moved to Tallinn and the club was renamed from Levadia Maardu to Levadia Tallinn, although the team had already been playing at the Kadriorg Stadium since 2000. The club's previously Tallinn-based reserve team changed its name to Levadia II. Under Rüütli, Levadia won the league in the 2004 season, but failed to defend the title in 2005, finishing as runners-up. In the 2006–07 UEFA Cup qualifying rounds, Levadia defeated Haka and Twente, both by a 2–1 aggregate score, and became the first Estonian club to reach the first round of the UEFA Cup. Levadia faced Newcastle United and were eliminated from the competition by losing 1–3 on aggregate. Domestically, Levadia went on to win four consecutive Meistriliiga titles in 2006, 2007, 2008 and 2009.

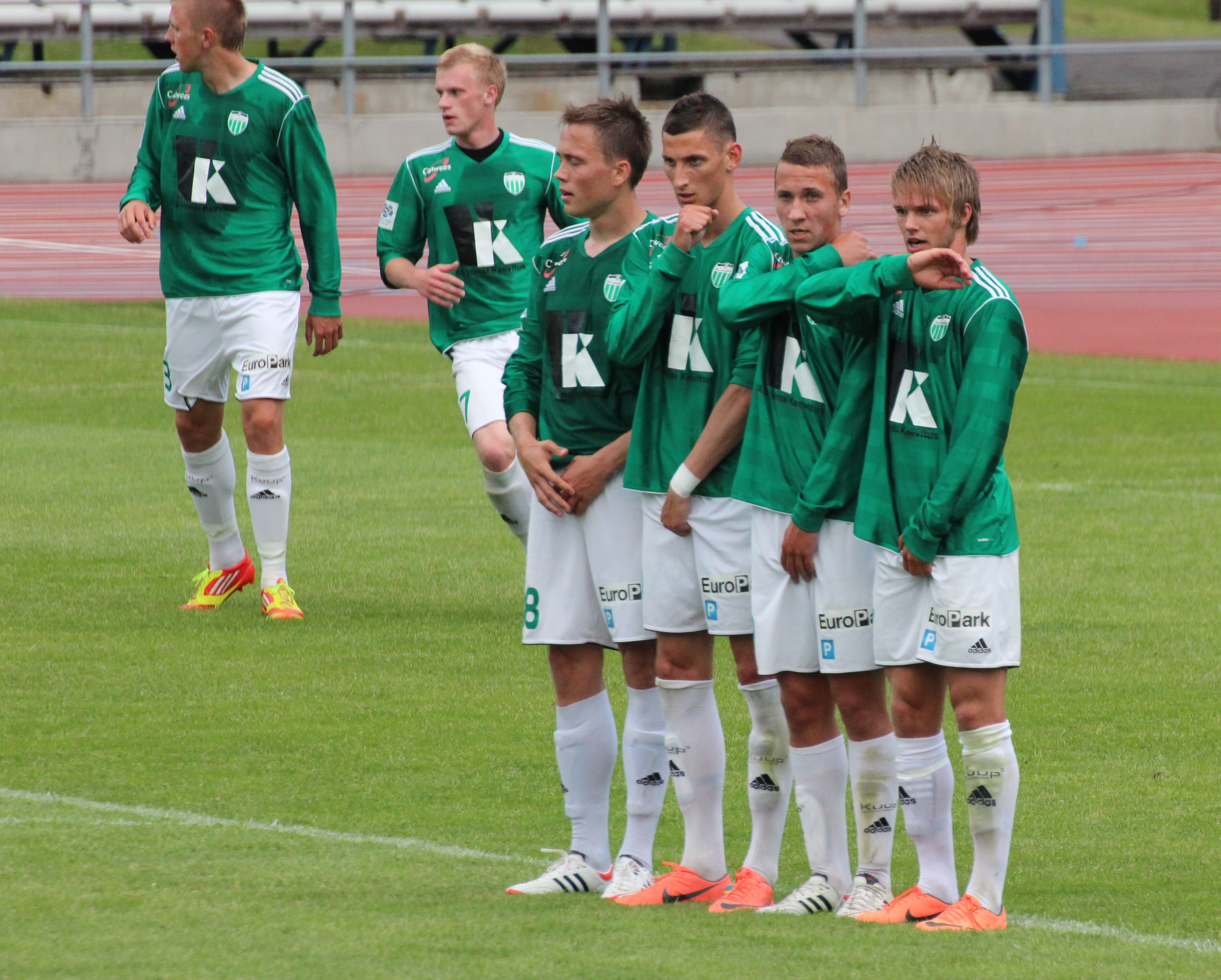
Levadia players in 2012

In March 2008, Rüütli was hired by the Estonian FA to coach the Estonia national team and his assistant Igor Prins took over as manager. Under Prins, Levadia won the aforementioned 2008 and 2009 league titles, with the 2009 title achieved with a record 97 points. The club also lifted the Estonian Cup in 2010. In August 2010, Prins was sacked due to disagreements with the board and replaced by Levadia II manager Aleksandr Puštov. Levadia finished the 2010 season as runners-up. In July 2011, Puštov was sacked after disappointing results in the Meistriliiga and the Champions League and replaced by Sergei Hohlov-Simson. Levadia finished the 2011 season in fourth place, their lowest ever league placing since the club was promoted to the Meistriliiga. In December 2011, Marko Kristal was appointed as manager. The club won the 2011–12 Estonian Cup and finished the 2012 season as runners-up. Levadia won the Meistriliiga title in the 2013 season and defended their title in 2014, but finished the 2015 season as runners-up. In November 2015, it was announced that Sergei Ratnikov will return to Levadia after 15 years and replace Kristal as manager. Ratnikov's second tenure as Levadia's manager lasted until July 2016, when he was sacked following a 0–1 loss to Pärnu Linnameeskond. He was replaced by another returning manager, Igor Prins. Levadia finished the 2016 season as runners-up.

=== Merger with FC Infonet and 10th league title (2017–2022) ===
Following another second-place finish in the 2017 season, Levadia announced they will merge with FC Infonet Tallinn, the Estonian champions of 2016. The two clubs merged their first teams, becoming FCI Levadia, with FCI Tallinn's Aleksandar Rogić taking over as manager. FCI Levadia finished the 2018 season as runners-up, but won the Estonian Cup, beating rivals FC Flora 1–0 in the final. In 2019, Levadia moved to Estonia's largest stadium A. Le Coq Arena. On 15 September 2019, Rogić was sacked after disappointing results, with assistant coach Vladimir Vassiljev taking over as caretaker manager. In November 2019, former Estonia head coach Martin Reim was appointed as manager. However, after a disappointing start to the season, Martin Reim decided to resign in July 2020 and Vladimir Vassiljev took over the role.

In August 2020, Levadia's former assistant coach Marko Savić returned to the club and became joint managers with Vassiljev. In the following 2021 season, Levadia ended their 7-year Premium Liiga title drought, becoming Estonian champions in the last day of the season, after drawing 2–2 with rivals FC Flora in the title-deciding final match. FCI Levadia also lifted the Estonian Cup in 2021 and Estonian Supercup in February 2022, again beating Flora in both of the finals. In July 2022, Marko Savić and Vladimir Vassiljev announced they will be stepping down as head coaches of the club, with the main driver for the resignation being the disappointing 1–6 loss against Víkingur Reykjavík in the UEFA Champions League preliminary round. The remainder of the 2022 season was widely described by Estonian media outlets as turbulent, with Levadia changing head coaches multiple times in a short period of time and sporting director Tarmo Kink and CEO Sergei Hohlov-Simson also leaving the club. FCI Levadia finished the 2022 season as runners-up.

=== Recent history (2023–present) ===
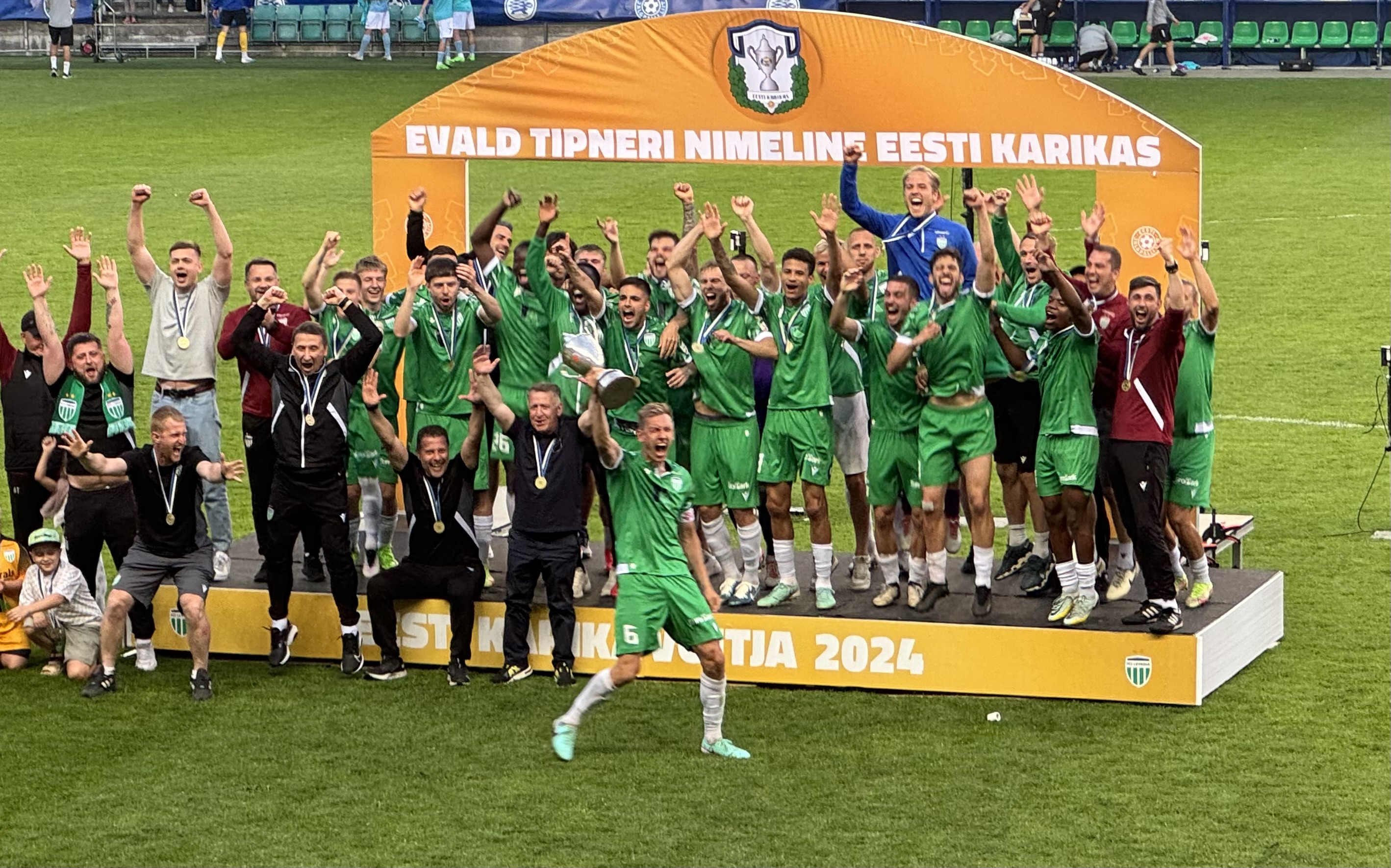
Levadia lifting their 11th Estonian Cup on 25 May 2024

In November 2022, Levadia announced the appointment of former Spanish international Curro Torres as manager. The club finished the 2023 season as runners-up, before winning the double in 2024 by defeating Paide Linnameeskond 4–2 in the 2023–24 Estonian Cup final and lifting their 11th Premium Liiga title at the end of the 2024 season. Levadia began the 2025 season by winning their 9th Estonian Supercup against Nõmme Kalju, but lost the 2024–25 Estonian Cup final to the same opponent on penalties three months later. The club had strengthened their team with the ambition of reaching the league phase in Europe, but after a disappointing loss in the Conference League third qualifying round, Levadia ultimately finished the 2025 league season as runners-up, and replaced Torres with Vjatšeslav Zahovaiko.

Led by Zahovaiko, Levadia won the 2026 Premium Liiga title with a league-record 27-point margin over the runners-up, finishing with 91 points and losing just one match.

== Kit ==
=== Colours ===
The colours of Levadia are green and white, with primary colour green symbolising that "Levadia" roughly translates to meadow in both Ukrainian (Левада) and Greek (λιβάδιον).

=== Kit manufacturers and shirt sponsors ===
Period	Kit manufacturer	Shirt sponsor	Ref
1998–1999	Uhlsport	—	
1999–2008	Adidas	Estonian Oil Service	
2009–2011	Adidas	EuroPark	
2012–2021	Adidas	Viimsi Keevitus	
2022	Adidas	Admirals, Viimsi Keevitus	
2023	Macron	Admirals, Viimsi Keevitus	
2024–	Macron	Viimsi Keevitus	

== Stadiums ==
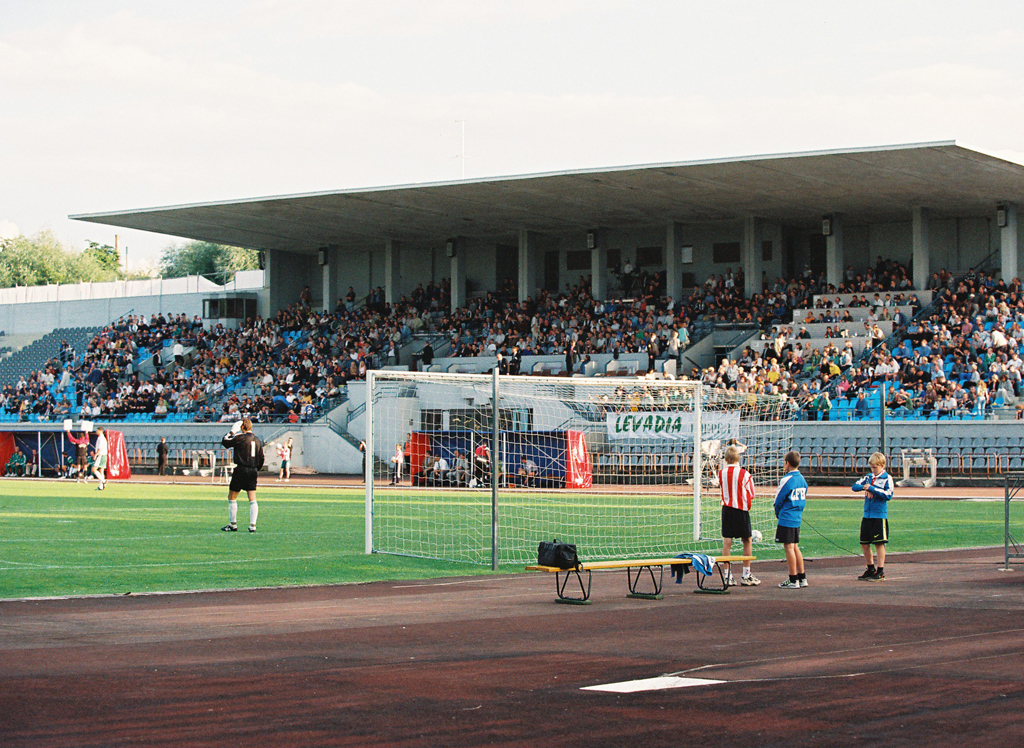
Kadriorg Stadium, home ground of Levadia from 2000 to 2018

For the first two seasons of its existence, Levadia played their home matches at Maardu linnastaadion in Maardu. In 2000, the club moved to the 5000-capacity Kadriorg Stadium in Tallinn. Opened in 1926, it is one of the oldest football stadiums in Estonia and used to be the home ground of the Estonia national team until the completion of Lilleküla Stadium in 2001.

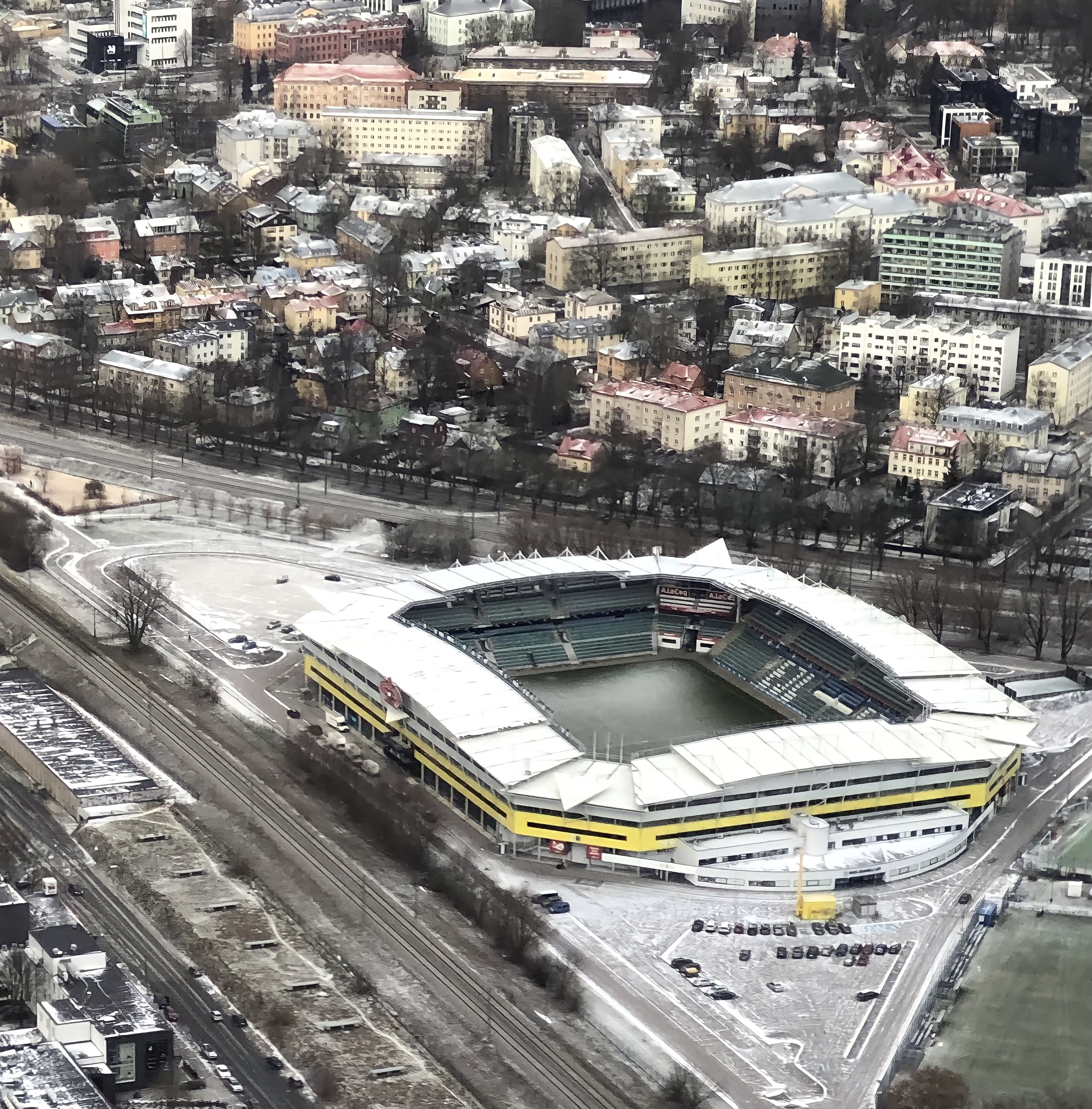
A. Le Coq Arena, home ground of Levadia since 2019

In 2019, Levadia moved to the 14,336-seat Lilleküla Stadium (commonly known as A. Le Coq Arena for sponsorship reasons). Opened in 2001 and expanded from 2016 to 2018, it is the largest football stadium in Estonia. The stadium is also home to Levadia's rival FC Flora and the Estonian national team. Lilleküla Stadium is located at Jalgpalli 21, Kesklinn, Tallinn.

Levadia uses Sportland Arena artificial turf stadium for training and home matches during winter and early spring months. Levadia’s summer and autumn trainings take place at their Maarjamäe training complex.

== Rivalries ==
=== The Tallinn Derby ===
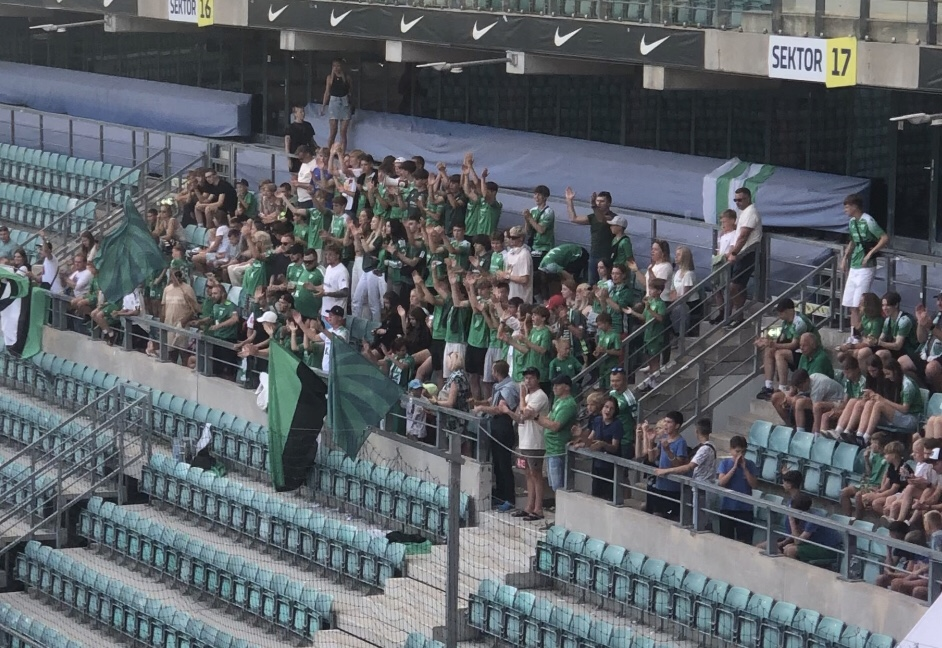
Levadia fan sector during their match against Flora on 28 June 2023

Levadia's deepest rivalry is with FC Flora and the fixture between the two clubs is known as the Tallinn Derby (Estonian: Tallinna derbi). Levadia and Flora are the two biggest and most successful clubs in Estonian football. The rivalry began in 1999, when Levadia entered Meistriliiga and immediately challenged the reigning champions Flora for the title, winning the treble in their first year in top-flight football. In the early 2000s, language and nationality was also one of the separating factors between the two clubs, as Levadia was seen as the club of choice for the Russian speaking population of the city and Flora for the Estonian speaking. However, that image of Levadia has since then faded away. From 2019, the two clubs also share their home ground A. Le Coq Arena. The attendance record of 3,510 was set on 28 June 2023.

== Players ==
=== First-team squad ===
As of 12 October 2026.

Note: Flags indicate national team as defined under FIFA eligibility rules; some limited exceptions apply. Players may hold more than one non-FIFA nationality.

No.	Pos.	Nation	Player
1	GK	EST	Oliver Ani
4	DF	EST	Tanel Tammik
5	MF	EST	Mark Oliver Roosnupp
6	MF	EST	Rasmus Peetson (captain)
7	FW	EST	Gregor Lehtmets
8	MF	RUS	Aleksandr Zakarliuka
9	FW	GEO	Nikoloz Kutateladze
10	FW	BRA	Wendell
11	MF	EST	Mihkel Ainsalu
17	FW	EST	Robert Kirss
18	MF	BRA	Alexandre

No.	Pos.	Nation	Player
19	FW	BRA	Geovani
20	DF	NGR	Abraham Nwankwo
21	MF	EST	Maksimilian Skvortsov
22	FW	CMR	Mollo Bessala
23	MF	EST	Frank Liivak
29	DF	EST	Joseph Saliste
33	MF	GHA	Enock Otoo
35	DF	NGR	Victory Iboro
36	MF	BRA	João Pedro
71	DF	BRA	Kauã Davi
99	GK	EST	Karl Andre Vallner

=== Out on loan ===
Note: Flags indicate national team as defined under FIFA eligibility rules; some limited exceptions apply. Players may hold more than one non-FIFA nationality.

No. / Pos. / Nation / Player; 14 / MF / EST / Aleksander Švedovski (at Kuressaare until 31 December 2026)	No. / Pos. / Nation / Player; 19 / FW / SEN / Moussa Félix Sambe (at Tammeka until 31 December 2026)

== Club officials ==
=== Current technical staff ===
Position	Name
Head coach	(Estonia) Vjatšeslav Zahovaiko
Assistant coach	(Estonia) Ken Kallaste
Goalkeeping coach	(Estonia) Artur Kotenko
Fitness coach	(Estonia) Dmitri Kovt
Doctor	(Ukraine) Pavlo Sirenko
Physiotherapists	(Estonia) Andrey Petrov
Physiotherapists	(Estonia) Maksim Kaho
Management
President	(Ukraine) Viktor Levada
Vice President	(Estonia) Andrei Leškin
Sporting Director	(Ukraine) Mikhail Gulordava
Technical Director	(Ukraine) Dmytro Shkrebets
Scout	(Ukraine) Andrii Oliinyk
Head of methodology	(Argentina) Benito Montalvo
Chief Executive Officer	(Estonia) Jevgeni Gurtšioglujants
CDO	(Estonia) Lauri Välja

=== Managerial history ===
Dates	Name
1999–2000	(Estonia) Sergei Ratnikov
2000	(Estonia) Ants Kommussaar
2000	(Estonia) Eduard Võrk
2001	(Estonia) Valeri Bondarenko
2002	(Finland) Pasi Rautiainen
2003	(Italy) Franco Pancheri
2003–2008	(Estonia) Tarmo Rüütli
2008–2010	(Estonia) Igor Prins
2010–2011	(Estonia) Aleksandr Puštov
2011	(Estonia) Sergei Hohlov-Simson
2012–2015	(Estonia) Marko Kristal
2016	(Estonia) Sergei Ratnikov
2016–2017	(Estonia) Igor Prins
2018–2019	(Serbia) Aleksandar Rogić
2019	(Estonia) Vladimir Vassiljev (interim)
2020	(Estonia) Martin Reim
2020–2022; 2021–2022	(Estonia) Vladimir Vassiljev (Serbia) Marko Savić
2022	(Serbia) Ivan Stojković (interim)
2022	(Ukraine) Maksym Kalynychenko
2022	(Russia) Nikita Andreev (interim)
2023–2025	(Spain) Curro Torres
2026–	(Estonia) Vjatšeslav Zahovaiko

== Honours ==
=== League ===
- Meistriliiga
  - Winners (12): 1999, 2000, 2004, 2006, 2007, 2008, 2009, 2013, 2014, 2021, 2024, 2026
- Esiliiga
  - Winners (1): 1998

=== Cups ===
- Estonian Cup
  - Winners (11): 1998–99, 1999–2000, 2003–04, 2004–05, 2006–07, 2009–10, 2011–12, 2013–14, 2017–18, 2020–21, 2023–24
- Estonian Supercup
  - Winners (9): 1999, 2000, 2001, 2010, 2013, 2015, 2018, 2022, 2025

== Seasons and statistics ==
=== Seasons ===
Season	Division	Pos	Pld	W	D	L	GF	GA	GD	Pts	Top goalscorer	Cup	Supercup
1998	Esiliiga	1	14	9	5	0	29	7	+22	32	(Estonia) Igor Bratšuk (9)		
1999	Meistriliiga	1	28	23	4	1	77	12	+65	73	(Estonia) Toomas Krõm (19)	Winners	Winners
2000	Meistriliiga	1	28	23	5	0	88	20	+68	74	(Estonia) Toomas Krõm (24)	Winners	Winners
2001	Meistriliiga	3	28	15	7	5	72	35	+37	55	(Estonia) Toomas Krõm (20)	Semi-finals	Winners
2002	Meistriliiga	2	28	20	8	2	79	25	+54	62	(Estonia) Vitali Leitan (14)	Runners-up	Runners-up
2003	Meistriliiga	3	28	15	4	9	54	30	+24	49	(Estonia) Argo Arbeiter (14)	Semi-finals	
2004	Meistriliiga	1	28	21	6	1	82	14	+68	69	(Estonia) Konstantin Nahk (12)	Winners	Runners-up
2005	Meistriliiga	2	36	28	5	3	97	25	+72	89	(Estonia) Indrek Zelinski (18)	Winners	Runners-up
2006	Meistriliiga	1	36	30	4	2	114	29	+85	94	(Estonia) Indrek Zelinski (21)	Second round	
2007	Meistriliiga	1	36	29	4	3	126	20	+106	91	(Estonia) Indrek Zelinski (24)	Winners	Runners-up
2008	Meistriliiga	1	36	29	6	1	105	22	+83	93	(Russia) Nikita Andreev (22)	Semi-finals	Runners-up
2009	Meistriliiga	1	36	31	4	1	121	23	+98	97	(Estonia) Vitali Gussev (26)	Quarter-finals	Runners-up
2010	Meistriliiga	2	36	26	8	2	100	16	+84	86	(Estonia) Tarmo Neemelo (20)	Winners	Winners
2011	Meistriliiga	4	36	21	10	5	76	25	+51	73	(Estonia) Vitali Leitan (20)	Second round	Runners-up
2012	Meistriliiga	2	36	25	8	3	85	22	+63	83	(Estonia) Igor Morozov (12)	Winners	
2013	Meistriliiga	1	36	30	1	5	69	24	+45	91	(Estonia) Rimo Hunt (22)	Fourth round	Winners
2014	Meistriliiga	1	36	26	6	4	112	19	+93	84	(Estonia) Igor Subbotin (32)	Winners	Runners-up
2015	Meistriliiga	2	36	22	10	4	78	32	+46	76	(Estonia) Ingemar Teever (24)	Third round	Winners
2016	Meistriliiga	2	36	24	6	6	77	30	+47	78	(Russia) Anton Miranchuk (14)	Fourth round	
2017	Meistriliiga	2	36	25	9	2	106	20	+86	84	(Estonia) Rimo Hunt (20)	Fourth round	
2018	Meistriliiga	2	36	26	6	4	109	26	+83	84	(Ukraine) Roman Debelko (28)	Winners	Winners
2019	Meistriliiga	2	36	24	6	6	98	32	+66	78	(Russia) Nikita Andreev (13)	Semi-finals	Runners-up
2020	Meistriliiga	3	29	17	6	6	66	37	+29	57	(Cameroon) Marcelin Gando (11)	Fourth round	
2021	Meistriliiga	1	32	25	3	4	84	38	+46	78	(Georgia (country)) Zakaria Beglarishvili (24)	Winners	
2022	Meistriliiga	2	36	24	7	5	74	25	+49	79	(Georgia (country)) Zakaria Beglarishvili (21)	Quarter-finals	Winners
2023	Meistriliiga	2	36	22	11	3	67	24	+43	77	(Cameroon) Mollo Bessala (13)	Third round	
2024	Meistriliiga	1	36	27	6	3	82	19	+63	87	(Estonia) Mihkel Ainsalu (Brazil) Felipe Felicio (11)	Winners	
2025	Meistriliiga	2	36	25	4	7	89	36	+53	79	(Estonia) Mihkel Ainsalu (Ghana) Ernest Agyiri (10)	Runners-up	Winners
2026	Meistriliiga	1	36	28	7	1	97	29	+68	91	(Brazil) Wendell (20)	Fourth round	

=== Europe ===
Season	Competition	Round	Opponent	Home	Away	Agg.
1999–00	UEFA Cup	First qualifying round	(Romania) Steaua București	1–4	0–3	1–7
2000–01	UEFA Champions League	First qualifying round	(Wales) Total Network Solutions	4–0	2–2	6–2
2000–01	UEFA Champions League	Second qualifying round	(Ukraine) Shakhtar Donetsk	1–5	1–4	2–9
2001–02	UEFA Champions League	First qualifying round	(Republic of Ireland) Bohemians	0–0	0–3	0–3
2002	UEFA Intertoto Cup	First round	(Portugal) União de Leiria	1–2	3–0	4–2
2002	UEFA Intertoto Cup	Second round	(Switzerland) Zürich	0–0	0–1	0–1
2002	1. UEFA awarded Levadia a 3–0 win due to União de Leiria fielding a suspended player.					
2003–04	UEFA Cup	First qualifying round	(Croatia) Varteks	1–3	2–3	3–6
2004–05	UEFA Cup	First qualifying round	(Republic of Ireland) Bohemians	0–0	3–1	3–1
2004–05	UEFA Cup	Second qualifying round	(Norway) Bodø/Glimt	2–1 (a.e.t.)	1–2	3–3 (7–8 p)
2005–06	UEFA Champions League	First qualifying round	(Georgia (country)) Dinamo Tbilisi	1–0	0–2	1–2
2006–07	UEFA Cup	First qualifying round	(Finland) Haka	2–0	0–1	2–1
2006–07	UEFA Cup	Second qualifying round	(Netherlands) Twente	1–0	1–1	2–1
2006–07	UEFA Cup	First round	(England) Newcastle United	0–1	1–2	1–3
2007–08	UEFA Champions League	First qualifying round	(North Macedonia) Pobeda	0–0	1–0	1–0
2007–08	UEFA Champions League	Second qualifying round	(Serbia) Red Star Belgrade	2–1	0–1	2–2 (a)
2008–09	UEFA Champions League	First qualifying round	(Republic of Ireland) Drogheda United	0–1	1–2	1–3
2009–10	UEFA Champions League	Second qualifying round	(Poland) Wisła Kraków	1–0	1–1	2–1
2009–10	UEFA Champions League	Third qualifying round	(Hungary) Debrecen	0–1	0–1	0–2
2009–10	UEFA Europa League	Play-off round	(Turkey) Galatasaray	1–1	0–5	1–6
2010–11	UEFA Champions League	Second qualifying round	(Hungary) Debrecen	1–1	2–3	3–4
2011–12	UEFA Europa League	Second qualifying round	(Luxembourg) Differdange 03	0–1	0–0	0–1
2012–13	UEFA Europa League	First qualifying round	(Lithuania) Šiauliai	1–0	1–2	2–2 (a)
2012–13	UEFA Europa League	Second qualifying round	(Cyprus) Anorthosis	1–3	0–3	1–6
2013–14	UEFA Europa League	First qualifying round	(Wales) Bala Town	3–1	0–1	3–2
2013–14	UEFA Europa League	Second qualifying round	(Romania) Pandurii Târgu Jiu	0–0	0–4	0–4
2014–15	UEFA Champions League	First qualifying round	(San Marino) La Fiorita	7–0	1–0	8–0
2014–15	UEFA Champions League	Second qualifying round	(Czech Republic) Sparta Prague	1–1	0–7	1–8
2015–16	UEFA Champions League	First qualifying round	(Northern Ireland) Crusaders	1–1	0–0	1–1 (a)
2016–17	UEFA Europa League	First qualifying round	(Faroe Islands) HB	1–1	2–0	3–1
2016–17	UEFA Europa League	Second qualifying round	(Czech Republic) Slavia Prague	3–1	0–2	3–3 (a)
2017–18	UEFA Europa League	First qualifying round	(Republic of Ireland) Cork City	0–2	2–4	2–6
2018–19	UEFA Europa League	First qualifying round	(Republic of Ireland) Dundalk	0–1	1–2	1–3
2019–20	UEFA Europa League	First qualifying round	(Iceland) Stjarnan	3–2 (a.e.t.)	1–2	4–4 (a)
2020–21	UEFA Europa League	First qualifying round	(Faroe Islands) B36 Tórshavn	—N/a	3–4	—N/a
2021–22	UEFA Europa Conference League	First qualifying round	(Gibraltar) St Joseph's	3–1	1–1	4–2
2021–22	UEFA Europa Conference League	Second qualifying round	(Republic of Ireland) Dundalk	1–2	2–2	3–4
2022–23	UEFA Champions League	Preliminary round	(Iceland) Víkingur Reykjavík	—N/a	1–6	—N/a
2022–23	UEFA Europa Conference League	Second qualifying round	(Malta) Hibernians	1–1	2–3	3–4
2023–24	UEFA Europa Conference League	First qualifying round	(Slovakia) Žilina	1–2	1–2	2–4
2024–25	UEFA Conference League	First qualifying round	(Lithuania) Šiauliai	0−0	2–0	2–0
2024–25	UEFA Conference League	Second qualifying round	(Croatia) Osijek	0–1	1–5	1–6
2025–26	UEFA Champions League	First qualifying round	(Latvia) RFS	0–1	0–1	0–2
2025–26	UEFA Conference League	Second qualifying round	(Georgia (country)) Iberia 1999	1–0	2–2 (a.e.t.)	3–2
2025–26	UEFA Conference League	Third qualifying round	(Luxembourg) Differdange 03	1−3 (a.e.t.)	3–2	4–5
2026–27	UEFA Conference League	First qualifying round	(Wales) Caernarfon Town	5–0	5–0	10–0
2026–27	UEFA Conference League	Second qualifying round	(Sweden) IFK Göteborg	1−3 (a.e.t.)	2–1	3–4
2027–28	UEFA Champions League	First qualifying round				

== Notes ==
1. UEFA awarded Levadia a 3–0 win due to União de Leiria fielding a suspended player.
