= Viktor Levada =

Ukrainian businessman, president of FCI Levadia

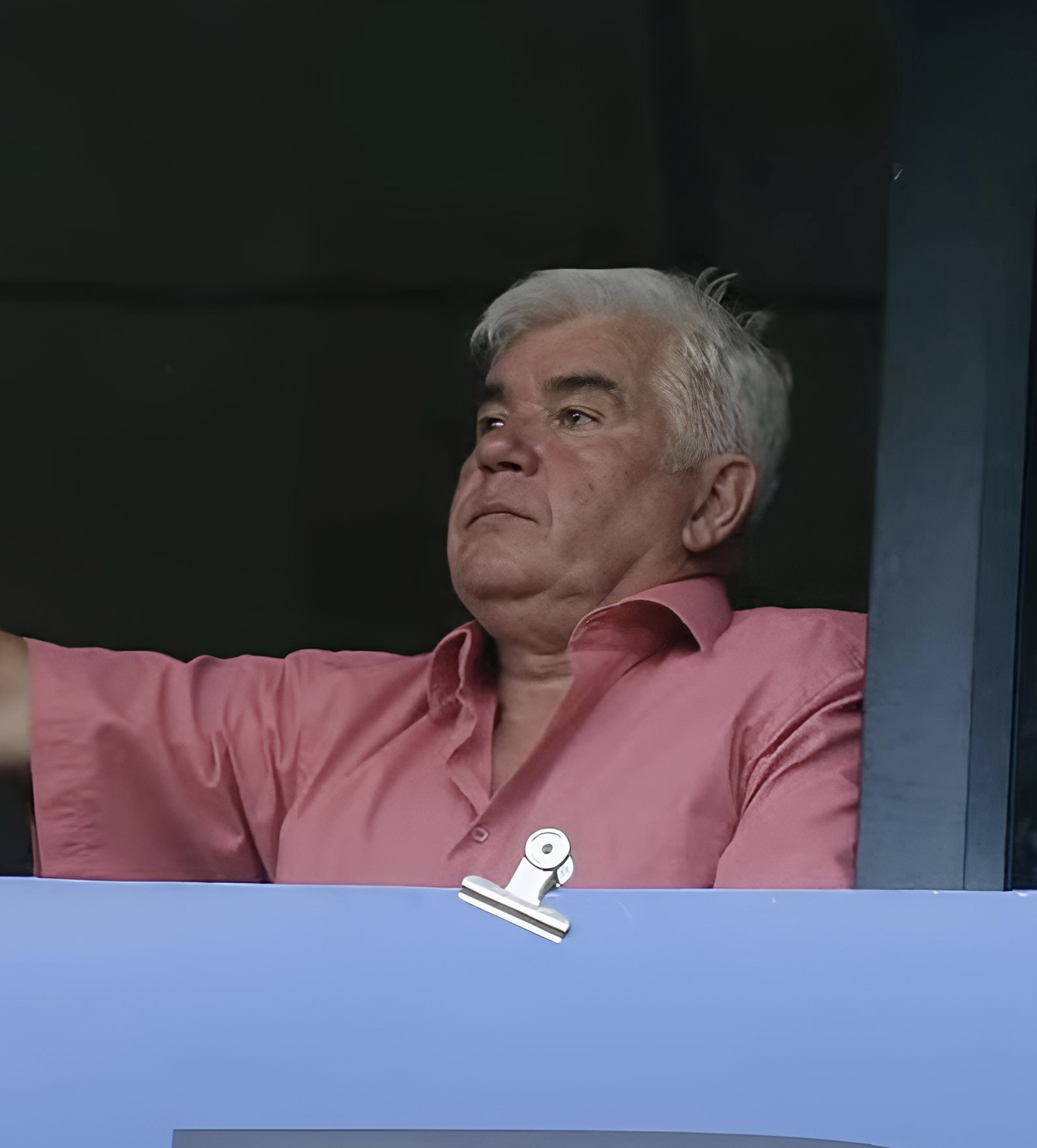
- Levada in 2024
- Born: 12 June 1959 (age 65); Oleksandriia, Ukraine

Viktor Levada (born 12 June 1959) is a Ukrainian businessman and sports executive. He is best known for being the founder and owner of Estonian football club FCI Levadia.

Viktor Levada was born in Oleksandriia and graduated from Odesa National Maritime University, before moving to Tallinn in 1982. In 1991, Levada founded metal and steel sales company Levadia OÜ, which over the years became one of the largest companies in the Baltic States. In 1998, Levadia OÜ became the sponsor of Estonian second division football club FK Olümpia Maardu, after a local coach had asked Levada for financial support to buy football boots and uniforms for Maardu's youth players. On 22 October 1998, Levada founded FC Levadia on the basis of the Maardu club.
