= Toomas Krõm =

Estonian footballer

Personal information
- Full name: Toomas Krõm
- Date of birth: 22 September 1971 (age 55)
- Place of birth: Tallinn, then part of Estonian SSR, Soviet Union
- Height: 1.78 m (5 ft 10 in)
- Position: Forward

Senior career*
Years	Team	Apps	(Gls)
–1998	Lõvid Tallinn		
1989–1991	Sport Tallinn		
1992–1993	Valo Mäntta		
1993–1995	Flora Tallinn		
1995–1996	Tervis Pärnu		
1996–1997	Sadam Tallinn		
1997–1999	Jaro Pietarsaari		
1999–2002	Levadia Tallinn		

International career^{‡}
1994–1996	Estonia	11	(0)
- * Club domestic league appearances and goals as of 1 January 2007 ‡ National team caps and goals as of 1 January 2007

Toomas Krõm (born 22 September 1971 in Tallinn) is a former professional footballer from Estonia, playing as a forward. Born in Tallinn, he twice became topscorer of the Premier Estonian League, named Meistriliiga: in 1999 and 2000. Krõm obtained a total number of 11 caps for the Estonia national football team during his career.
