= Dmitri Ustritski =

Estonian footballer

Personal information
- Full name: Dmitri Ustritski
- Date of birth: 8 May 1975 (age 51)
- Place of birth: Tallinn, then part of Estonian SSR, Soviet Union
- Height: 1.75 m (5 ft 9 in)
- Position: Forward

Senior career*
Years	Team	Apps	(Gls)
1994–1997	Tallinna Sadam	74	(25)
1999–2006	Viljandi Tulevik	160	(81)
2003	→ FC Valga (loan)	16	(7)

International career^{‡}
1998–2003	Estonia	17	(1)
- * Club domestic league appearances and goals as of 24 May 2008 ‡ National team caps and goals as of 24 May 2008

Dmitri Ustritski (born 8 May 1975 in Tallinn) is a former Estonian professional footballer. He was playing the position of striker. He spent the prime years of his career playing for JK Viljandi Tulevik. He won a total of 17 international caps for the Estonia national football team.

== International career ==
=== International goals ===
Scores and results list Estonia's goal tally first.

No	Date	Venue	Opponent	Score	Result	Competition
1.	18 August 1999	Pärnu Kalevi Stadium, Pärnu, Estonia	Armenia	2–0	2–0	Friendly
