= Robi Saarma =

Estonian footballer (born 2001)

Personal information
- Full name: Robi Saarma
- Date of birth: 20 May 2001 (age 25)
- Place of birth: Tallinn, Estonia
- Position: Forward

Team information
- Current team: Pardubice
- Number: 77

Youth career
- 2010–2020: Nõmme United

Senior career*
Years	Team	Apps	(Gls)
2017–2021	Nõmme United	108	(73)
2021	→ Nõmme United U21	1	(3)
2022–2025	Paide Linnameeskond	117	(43)
2022–2023	→ Paide Linnameeskond U21	4	(0)
2025–	Pardubice	21	(0)

International career^{‡}
- Estonia U15
- Estonia U16
2015	Estonia U17	1	(0)
2018	Estonia U18	1	(0)
2019	Estonia U19	9	(0)
2022	Estonia U21	4	(0)
2023–	Estonia	18	(1)
- * Club domestic league appearances and goals as of 27 May 2026 ‡ National team caps and goals as of 8 October 2026

Robi Saarma (born 20 May 2001) is an Estonian professional footballer who currently plays as a forward for Czech First League club Pardubice and the Estonia national team.

== Club career ==
He played for Nõmme United and was the league's top goal scorer before he joined Paide Linnameeskond in January 2022.

On 22 July 2025, Saarma signed a contract with Czech First League club Pardubice.

== International career ==
Saarma made his senior international debut for Estonia on 12 January 2023, in a 1–0 victory over Finland in a friendly.

== Career statistics ==
=== Club ===
As of match played 4 October 2025

Appearances and goals by club, season and competition
Club	Season	League			Cup		Europe		Other		Total	
Club	Season	Division	Apps	Goals	Apps	Goals	Apps	Goals	Apps	Goals	Apps	Goals
Nõmme United	2018	Esiliiga B	34	15	1	0	—		—		35	18
Nõmme United	2019	Esiliiga B	29	26	1	0	—		—		30	26
Nõmme United	2020	Esiliiga	13	4	0	0	—		—		13	4
Nõmme United	2021	Esiliiga	30	28	1	0	—		—		31	28
Nõmme United	Total		106	74	3	0	—		—		109	74
Nõmme United U21	2021	Esiliiga B	1	3	—		—		—		1	3
Paide Linnameeskond	2022	Meistriliiga	34	16	1	0	5 (Note: Appearances in UEFA Conference League)	0	—		40	16
Paide Linnameeskond	2023	Meistriliiga	28	4	3	1	1	0	—		42	5
Paide Linnameeskond	2024	Meistriliiga	36	15	5	5	6	2	—		47	22
Paide Linnameeskond	2025	Meistriliiga	19	8	1	0	2	2	—		22	10
Paide Linnameeskond	Total		117	43	10	6	14	4	—		141	53
Paide Linnameeskond U21	2022	Esiliiga	3	0	—		—		—		3	0
Paide Linnameeskond U21	2023	Esiliiga	1	0	—		—		—		1	0
Paide Linnameeskond U21	Total		4	0	—		—		—		4	0
Pardubice	2025–26	Czech First League	10	0	2	0	—		—		12	0
Career total			238	110	15	6	14	4	0	0	277	130

=== International ===
As of match played 6 October 2026

Appearances and goals by national team and year
National team	Year	Apps	Goals
Estonia	2023	1	0
Estonia	2024	4	0
Estonia	2025	8	1
Estonia	2026	5	1
Total		18	1

Estonia score listed first, score column indicates score after each Saarma goal.

List of international goals scored by Robi Saarma
No.	Date	Venue	Cap	Opponent	Score	Result	Competition
1	13 November 2025	Ullevaal Stadion, Oslo, Norway	13	Norway	1–4	1–4	2026 FIFA World Cup qualification

== Honours ==
Nõmme United

- Esiliiga B: 2019

Paide Linnameeskond

- Estonian Cup: 2021–22

Individual

- Esiliiga Top Goalscorer: 2021
- Meistriliiga Fans' Player of the Year: 2022
