= Patrik Kristal =

Estonian footballer (born 2007)

Personal information
- Date of birth: 12 November 2007 (age 19)
- Place of birth: Viimsi Vald, Estonia
- Height: 1.70 m (5 ft 7 in)
- Positions: Attacking midfielder; forward

Team information
- Current team: Thun (on loan from 1. FC Köln)
- Number: 15

Youth career
- 2013–2016: Harju JK
- 2017–2021: Tallinna Kalev
- 2022–2023: Levadia

Senior career*
Years	Team	Apps	(Gls)
2022–2023	Levadia	5	(0)
2022–2023	→ Levadia U21	62	(16)
2024	Paide Linnameeskond	31	(7)
2024	→ Paide U21	1	(0)
2025–	1. FC Köln II	43	(0)
2026–	→ Thun (loan)	1	(0)

International career^{‡}
2022	Estonia U16	2	(2)
2022–2023	Estonia U17	15	(4)
2024–	Estonia U19	3	(1)
2024–	Estonia U21	3	(1)
2024–	Estonia	20	(1)
- * Club domestic league appearances and goals as of 20 September 2026 ‡ National team caps and goals as of 19:40, 16 November 2026 (UTC)

Patrik Kristal (born 12 November 2007) is an Estonian professional footballer who plays for Swiss Super League club Thun on loan from Bundesliga club 1. FC Köln, and the Estonia national team.

== Club career ==
As a youth, Kristal began his career with Harju JK before moving to Tallinna Kalev in 2017. In the 2014 Summer Cup held in Pärnu he scored for Harju against Nõmme Kalju FC with the goal being compared to James Rodriguez's 2014 FIFA World Cup goal against Uruguay by local media. For the 2021 season he also played for the Estonian under-15 national team in the under-17 league. He scored 17 goals during the season while serving as captain.

In January 2022, Kristal moved to FCI Levadia Tallinn. On 15 July of that year he made his senior debut as an 81st-minute substitute for Zakaria Beglarišvili in a 3–0 victory over Tartu JK Tammeka. In the process, he became the youngest-ever player to appear in a Meistriliiga match at 14 years 11 months and 2 days old. The record had previously been held by Andrei Tjunin since 1994.

On 19 July 2024, German club 1. FC Köln announced that they had signed Kristal, starting from 1 January 2025.

== International career ==
In October 2022, Kristal scored in a friendly against Northern Ireland U16 played in Finland. He captained the team in the match. The next day he scored again in a 2–6 friendly defeat to the hosts. Later that month, he was named to Estonia's squad for 2023 UEFA European Under-17 Championship qualification.

In April 2023 he captained the national under-16 team again, this time for an UEFA under-16 development tournament held in Malta. In June 2023 Kristal scored and assisted on three goals in a 4–2 victory over Lithuania in the Under-17 Baltic Cup, again serving as captain. In Estonia's next match of the tournament, Kristal scored two goals in a 3–3 draw with Latvia.

Kristal made his debut for the senior Estonia national team on 8 September 2024 in a Nations League game against Sweden at Strawberry Arena. He substituted Vlasiy Sinyavskiy in the 72nd minute, as Sweden won 3–0. In the process, Kristal became the youngest-ever player to appear in the UEFA Nations League and for the Estonia senior national team at 16 years 9 months and 27 days old.

== Career statistics ==
=== Club ===
As of match played 16 May 2026

Appearances and goals by club, season and competition
Club	Season	League			National cup (Note: Includes Estonian Cup)		Europe		Other		Total	
Club	Season	Division	Apps	Goals	Apps	Goals	Apps	Goals	Apps	Goals	Apps	Goals
Levadia	2022	Meistriliiga	2	0	0	0	—		—		2	0
Levadia	2023	Meistriliiga	3	0	0	0	—		—		3	0
Levadia	Total		5	0	0	0	0	0	0	0	5	0
Levadia U21	2022	Esiliiga	32	6	—		—		—		32	6
Levadia U21	2023	Esiliiga	30	10	—		—		—		30	10
Levadia U21	Total		62	16	—		—		—		62	16
Paide Linnameeskond	2024	Meistriliiga	31	7	4	0	6 (Note: Appearances in UEFA Conference League)	1	—		41	8
Paide U21	2024	Esiliiga	1	0	—		—		—		1	0
1. FC Köln II	2024–25	Regionalliga West	15	0	—		—		—		15	0
1. FC Köln II	2025–26	Regionalliga West	28	0	—		—		—		28	0
1. FC Köln II	Total		43	0	—		—		—		43	0
Career total			142	23	4	0	6	1	0	0	152	24

=== International ===
As of match played 16 November 2026

Appearances and goals by national team and year
National team	Year	Apps	Goals
Estonia
Estonia	2024	3	0
Estonia	2025	7	0
Estonia	2026	10	1
Total		20	1

Scores and results list Estonia's goal tally first, score column indicates score after each Kristal goal.

List of international goals scored by Patrik Kristal
No.	Date	Venue	Cap	Opponent	Score	Result	Competition
1	16 November 2026	Lilleküla Stadium, Tallinn, Estonia	20	Bulgaria	1–0	2–1	2026–27 UEFA Nations League C

== Personal life ==
Kristal is the son of former Estonia international Marko Kristal.

== Honours ==
Individual

- Meistriliiga Under–21 Player of the Season: 2024
