= Esiliiga Player of the Year =

Estonian football award

The Esiliiga Player of the Year is an annual award given to the best Esiliiga player for his performances in the league.

== Esiliiga Player of the Year ==
Year	Player	Club
2011	(Estonia) Rimo Hunt	Tallinna Kalev
2012	(Ivory Coast) Manucho	Infonet
2014	(Estonia) Kristen Saarts	Pärnu Linnameeskond/Levadia II
2015	(Estonia) Eduard Golovljov (1)	Infonet II
2016	(Estonia) Eduard Golovljov (2)	Infonet II
2017	(Estonia) Vitali Gussev (1)	Maardu Linnameeskond
2018	(Estonia) Vitali Gussev (2)	Maardu Linnameeskond
2019	(Estonia) Denis Vnukov	Legion
2020	(Estonia) Kevin Mätas	Nõmme United
2021	(Estonia) Ats Purje	Tallinna Kalev
2022	(Estonia) Egert Õunapuu (1)	Nõmme United
2023	(Estonia) Egert Õunapuu (2)	Nõmme United
2024	(Estonia) Gregor Lehtmets	Viimsi
2025	(Georgia (country)) Zakaria Beglarishvili	Nõmme United

== See also ==
- Meistriliiga Player of the Year
- Esiliiga B Player of the Year
