= 2025 Esiliiga =

35th season of the second tier of Estonian football

Esiliiga
- Season: 2025
- Dates: 1 March – 9 November 2025
- Champions: Nõmme United
- Promoted: Nõmme United
- Relegated: Tallinna Kalev U21; Tammeka U21
- Matches: 169
- Goals: 627 (3.71 per match)
- Top goalscorer: Egert Õunapuu (19 goals)
- Biggest home win: Flora U21 9–0 Tammeka U21 (25 April 2025)
- Biggest away win: Tammeka U21 0–12 Nõmme United (20 June 2025)
- Highest scoring: Tammeka U21 0–12 Nõmme United (20 June 2025)
- Longest winning run: Nõmme United (4 matches)
- Longest unbeaten run: Elva (5 matches)
- Longest winless run: Tallinna Kalev U21 (7 matches)
- Longest losing run: Tammeka U21 (6 matches)

The 2025 Esiliiga was the 35th season of the Esiliiga, the second tier of Estonian football. The season began on 1 March and concluded on 9 November 2025.

== Teams ==
The league consisted of ten teams; seven teams remaining from the previous season, two teams promoted from the Esiliiga B, and one team relegated from the Meistriliiga.

The promoted teams were the 2024 Esiliiga B champions Tammeka U21 and runners-up Nõmme Kalju U21. They replaced the 2024 Esiliiga bottom two teams Paide Linnameeskond U21 and Tabasalu.

The relegated team was the 2024 Meistriliiga bottom-placed team Nõmme United. They replaced the 2024 Esiliiga champions Harju.

=== Stadiums and locations ===
Locations of the 2025 Esiliiga teams

Team	Location	Stadium	Capacity
Elva	Elva	Elva linnastaadion	30
FCI Levadia U21	Tallinn	Maarjamäe Stadium	30
Flora U21	Tallinn	Sportland Arena	1,172
Nõmme Kalju U21	Tallinn	Hiiu Stadium	570
Nõmme United	Tallinn	Männiku Stadium	500
Tallinn	Tallinn	Lasnamäe Sports Complex Stadium	200
Tallinna Kalev U21	Tallinn	Sportland Arena	1,172
Tammeka U21	Tartu	Sepa Jalgpallikeskus	504
Viimsi	Haabneeme	Viimsi Stadium	1,006
Welco	Tartu	Holm Park	580

=== Personnel and kits ===
Team	Manager	Captain	Kit manufacturer	Shirt sponsor
Elva	(Estonia) Kaido Koppel	(Estonia) Jasper Reilson	Nike	Sportland
FCI Levadia U21	(Spain) Santi García	(Estonia) Maksim Gussev	Macron	Viimsi Keevitus
Flora U21	(Estonia) Taavi Viik	(Estonia) Johann Vahermägi	Nike	Optibet
Nõmme Kalju U21	(Estonia) Erik Šteinberg	(Estonia) Igor Subbotin	Adidas	Marsbet
Nõmme United	(Poland) Sławomir Cisakowski	(Estonia) Andre Frolov	Adidas	TonyBet
Tallinn	(Estonia) Andrei Kalimullin	(Estonia) Vladislav Tšurilkin	Adidas	CryptoWallet
Tallinna Kalev U21	(Estonia) Ats Purje	(Estonia) Kenlou Laasner	Macron	Unibet
Tammeka U21	(Estonia) Marti Pähn		Nike	None
Viimsi	(Estonia) Ivo Lehtmets	(Estonia) Markus Allast	Joma	Assa Abloy
Welco	(Estonia) Jaanus Reitel	(Estonia) Tauno Tekko	Adidas	Holm Bank

=== Managerial changes ===
Team	Outgoing manager	Manner of departure	Date of vacancy	Position in the table	Incoming manager	Date of appointment
Nõmme United	(Estonia) Martin Klasen	Appointed as sporting director	6 December 2024	Pre-season	(Poland) Sławomir Cisakowski	2 February 2025
Flora U21	(Estonia) Andris Altsaar	Mutual consent	6 January 2025	Pre-season	(Estonia) Taavi Viik	6 January 2025
Tallinna Kalev U21	(Estonia) Alo Bärengrub	Mutual consent	6 January 2025	Pre-season	(Estonia) Ats Purje	6 January 2025
Tammeka U21	(Estonia) Karl Gustav Kärner	Mutual consent	18 July 2025	10th	(Estonia) Marti Pähn	18 July 2025

== League table ==
Pos	Team	Pld	W	D	L	GF	GA	GD	Pts	Promotion, qualification or relegation
1	Nõmme United (C, P)	36	30	2	4	125	27	+98	92	Promotion to the Meistriliiga
2	Viimsi	36	24	6	6	83	27	+56	78	Qualification for the Meistriliiga play-off
3	Welco	36	18	9	9	76	56	+20	63	
4	Elva	36	17	7	12	62	59	+3	58	
5	Flora U21	36	13	9	14	61	56	+5	48	
6	FCI Levadia U21	36	12	9	15	62	67	−5	45	
7	Nõmme Kalju U21	36	13	6	17	56	79	−23	45	
8	Tallinn (O)	36	11	7	18	61	75	−14	40	Qualification for the Esiliiga play-off
9	Tallinna Kalev U21 (R)	36	5	12	19	53	96	−43	27	Relegation to the Esiliiga B
10	Tammeka U21 (R)	36	3	1	32	40	137	−97	10	Relegation to the Esiliiga B

Source: Esiliiga
Rules for classification: 1) Points; 2) Less matches awarded against; 3) Head-to-head points; 4) Head-to-head goal difference; 5) Matches won; 6) Goal difference; 7) Goals scored; 8) Away goals scored; 9) Fair-play points; 10) Draw
(C) Champions; (O) Play-off winners; (P) Promoted; (R) Relegated

== Results ==
Teams face each other four times (twice at home and twice away).

Home \ Away	ELV	FCI	FLO	KAL	NÕM	TAL	TAK	TAM	VII	WEL	ELV	FCI	FLO	KAL	NÕM	TAL	TAK	TAM	VII	WEL
Elva		2–2	2–2	2–1	0–2	1–1	5–3	4–3	1–0	3–1		2–0	2–0	0–1	1–4	1–0	0–2	2–1	0–3	1–2
FCI Levadia U21	3–2		0–2	3–3	1–2	0–2	4–1	7–0	0–3	3–3	2–1		1–2	0–0	3–2	5–6	3–3	3–0	0–2	1–1
Flora U21	0–1	2–0		3–0	0–2	2–0	2–2	9–0	0–0	3–3	2–0	5–0		1–2	1–5	2–4	1–1	4–2	1–0	1–1
Nõmme Kalju U21	0–2	0–1	2–1		1–5	2–4	3–3	3–0	2–4	0–4	1–1	3–2	3–0		0–4	1–0	4–1	4–1	2–2	0–3
Nõmme United	4–1	3–0	4–1	3–2		4–0	4–0	6–2	2–0	0–1	5–0	0–2	4–0	2–1		6–0	8–0	6–0	1–0	5–2
Tallinn	1–1	1–1	1–0	7–0	1–2		1–1	3–1	0–2	1–5	1–2	2–3	2–3	2–1	1–4		2–2	2–0	1–2	0–2
Tallinna Kalev U21	0–1	2–2	2–2	1–2	1–3	0–3		6–1	0–4	1–2	0–3	1–1	1–4	2–2	0–3	2–2		5–0	0–5	1–3
Tammeka U21	2–5	0–1	2–1	0–2	0–12	2–3	5–1		0–1	0–1	1–2	2–6	0–1	1–5	1–3	5–2	4–5		0–4	2–2
Viimsi	3–3	2–0	1–1	5–0	1–0	3–1	4–0	4–0		2–1	1–1	1–2	2–0	4–0	1–1	2–1	1–0	6–0		3–2
Welco	2–5	1–0	4–2	0–1	1–1	3–1	1–1	3–2	3–1		3–2	3–0	0–0	5–2	1–3	2–2	1–2	3–0	1–4	

Source: Flashscore
Legend: Blue = home team win; Yellow = draw; Red = away team win.

== Esiliiga play-off ==
The eighth-placed team (Tallinn) faced the third-placed team of the 2025 Esiliiga B (Phoenix) in a two-legged play-off for the final place in the 2026 Esiliiga.

=== First leg ===
15 November 2025	Phoenix	2–2	Tallinn	Jõhvi
11:00 BST	Džemesjuk 49' (o.g.); Stoyanov 69'		Kulik 67'; Arhipov 85'	Stadium: Heino Lipp Stadium

=== Second leg ===
22 November 2025	Tallinn	1–0 (a.e.t.) (3–2 agg.)	Phoenix	Tallinn
11:00 BST	Arhipov 108'			Stadium: Lasnamäe Spordikompleksi kunstmurustaadion

== Season statistics ==
=== Top scorers ===
Rank	Player	Club	Goals
1	(Estonia) Egert Õunapuu	Nõmme United	23
2	(Portugal) Tiago Baptista	Nõmme Kalju U21	19
3	(Georgia (country)) Zakaria Beglarishvili	Nõmme United	17
4	(Estonia) Raiko Ilves	Tallinna Kalev U21	15
4	(Estonia) Kenlou Laasner	Tallinna Kalev U21	15
4	(Estonia) Rasmus Talu	Tallinna Kalev U21 / Viimsi	15
7	(Estonia) Maksim Gussev	FCI Levadia U21	14
8	(Ivory Coast) Mosès Fofana	Viimsi	13
9	(Estonia) Erki Mõttus	Welco	12
10	(Estonia) Karl Kiidron	Tammeka U21	11
10	(Russia) Kirill Nesterov	Tallinn	11

== Awards ==
=== Monthly awards ===
Month	Player of the Month		Manager of the Month	
Month	Player	Club	Manager	Club
March	(Estonia) Andre Paju	Elva	(Poland) Sławomir Cisakowski	Nõmme United
April	(Estonia) Erki Mõttus	Welco	(Estonia) Jaanus Reitel	Welco
May	(Ivory Coast) Mosès Fofana	Viimsi	(Estonia) Ivo Lehtmets	Viimsi
June	(Estonia) Leonid Arhipov	Tallinn	(Estonia) Andrei Kalimullin	Tallinn
July	(Estonia) Egert Õunapuu	Nõmme United	(Poland) Sławomir Cisakowski	Nõmme United
August	(Estonia) Raiko Ilves	Tallinna Kalev U21	(Estonia) Ats Purje	Tallinna Kalev U21
September	(Georgia (country)) Zakaria Beglarishvili	Nõmme United	(Poland) Sławomir Cisakowski	Nõmme United
October	(Estonia) Rasmus Talu	Viimsi	(Spain) Santi García	FCI Levadia U21

=== Annual awards ===
The Esiliiga Player of the Year was awarded to Zakaria Beglarishvili.
