= 2022 Esiliiga =

Estonian football league season for second division

Esiliiga
- Season: 2022
- Dates: 3 March 2022 – 13 November 2022
- Champions: Harju
- Promoted: Harju
- Relegated: Tulevik; Pärnu Jalgpalliklubi
- Matches played: 180
- Goals scored: 663 (3.68 per match)
- Top goalscorer: Egert Õunapuu (36 goals)
- Biggest home win: Elva 9–0 Tulevik (6 August 2022)
- Biggest away win: Tulevik 0–7 Nõmme United (10 September 2022)
- Highest scoring: Elva 9–1 Paide Linnameeskond U21 (17 September 2022)
- Longest winning run: 9 matches Paide Linnameeskond U21
- Longest unbeaten run: 14 matches FCI Levadia U21
- Longest winless run: 22 matches Pärnu Jalgpalliklubi
- Longest losing run: 10 matches Alliance

The 2022 Esiliiga was the 32nd season of the Esiliiga, the second tier of Estonian football. The season started on 3 March 2022 and concluded on 13 November 2022.

== Teams ==
=== Stadiums and locations ===
Locations of the 2022 Esiliiga teams

Team	Location	Stadium	Capacity
Alliance	Kohtla-Järve	Kohtla-Järve Sports Centre Stadium	150
Elva	Elva	Elva linnastaadion	30
FCI Levadia U21	Tallinn	Maarjamäe Stadium	30
Flora U21	Tallinn	Lilleküla training ground I	150
Harju	Laagri	Laagri Stadium	40
Nõmme United	Tallinn	Männiku Stadium	50
Paide Linnameeskond U21	Paide	Paide linnastaadion	500
Pärnu Jalgpalliklubi	Pärnu	Pärnu Rannastaadion	1,501
Tulevik	Viljandi	Viljandi linnastaadion	384
Viimsi	Haabneeme	Viimsi Stadium	800

=== Personnel and kits ===
Team	Manager	Captain	Kit manufacturer	Shirt sponsor
Alliance	(Estonia) Erik Šteinberg	(Estonia) Erik Kruglov	Adidas	Viru Keemia Grupp
Elva	(Estonia) Veiko Haan	(Estonia) Markus Lokk	Nike	Sportland
FCI Levadia U21	(Estonia) Artjom Artjunin	(Estonia) Andres Järve	Adidas	Admirals, Viimsi Keevitus
Flora U21	(Estonia) Taavi Viik	(Estonia) Karl Orren	Nike	Optibet
Harju	(Portugal) Victor Silva	(Estonia) Andre Järva	Adidas	Enemat
Nõmme United	(Estonia) Martin Klasen	(Estonia) Oliver Ani	Uhlsport	Apollo
Paide Linnameeskond U21	(Estonia) Meelis Rooba	(Estonia) Rasmus Kallas	Nike	Exmet, Verston
Pärnu Jalgpalliklubi	(Estonia) Igor Prins	(Estonia) Mirko Mardiste	Hummel	Savi
Tulevik	(Estonia) Indrek Ilves	(Estonia) Gustav-Hendrik Seeder	Joma	Airok
Viimsi	(Estonia) Ivo Lehtmets	(Estonia) Oskar Jõgi	Joma	Assa Abloy

=== Managerial changes ===
Team	Outgoing manager	Manner of departure	Date of vacancy	Position in the table	Incoming manager	Date of appointment
Tulevik	(Estonia) Sander Post	Signed by Flora	18 December 2021	Pre-season	(Estonia) Indrek Ilves	8 January 2022
Flora U21	(Estonia) Ats Sillaste	Signed by Paide Linnameeskond	21 December 2021	Pre-season	(Estonia) Taavi Viik	1 January 2022
Paide Linnameeskond U21	(Estonia) Erki Kesküla	Mutual consent	31 December 2021	Pre-season	(Estonia) Meelis Rooba	1 January 2022
FCI Levadia U21	(Estonia) Robert Sadovski	Mutual consent	11 January 2022	Pre-season	(Serbia) Ivan Stojković	11 January 2022
FCI Levadia U21	(Serbia) Ivan Stojković	Promoted to FCI Levadia	1 July 2022	1st	(Russia) Nikita Andreev	1 July 2022
FCI Levadia U21	(Russia) Nikita Andreev	Promoted to FCI Levadia	22 September 2022	3rd	(Estonia) Artjom Artjunin	22 September 2022

== League table ==
Pos	Team	Pld	W	D	L	GF	GA	GD	Pts	Qualification or relegation
1	Harju (C, P)	36	24	4	8	97	46	+51	76	Promotion to Meistriliiga
2	FCI Levadia U21	36	21	5	10	85	45	+40	68	Reserve teams are not eligible to be promoted to the Meistriliiga
3	Elva	36	20	6	10	76	52	+24	66	Qualification for promotion play-offs
4	Viimsi	36	20	3	13	76	40	+36	63	
5	Flora U21	36	19	5	12	88	52	+36	62	Reserve teams are not eligible to be promoted to the Meistriliiga
6	Nõmme United	36	18	6	12	79	56	+23	60	
7	Paide Linnameeskond U21	36	17	1	18	75	88	−13	52	Reserve teams are not eligible to be promoted to the Meistriliiga
8	Alliance (O)	36	8	3	25	29	105	−76	27	Qualification for relegation play-offs
9	Tulevik (R)	36	6	5	25	28	102	−74	23	Relegation to Esiliiga B
10	Pärnu Jalgpalliklubi (R)	36	4	8	24	30	77	−47	20	Relegation to Esiliiga B

Source: Esiliiga
Rules for classification: 1) Points; 2) Less matches awarded against; 3) Head-to-head points; 4) Head-to-head goal difference; 5) Matches won; 6) Goal difference; 7) Goals scored; 8) Away goals scored; 9) Fair-play points; 10) Draw
(C) Champions; (O) Play-off winners; (P) Promoted; (R) Relegated

== Results ==
=== Matches 1–18 ===
Home \ Away	ALL	ELV	LEV	FLO	HAR	NÕM	PLM	PÄR	TUL	VII
Alliance	—	0–2	0–4	0–3	0–3	2–2	0–2	1–0	1–0	1–0
Elva	4–1	—	3–4	1–4	2–0	1–1	1–2	0–0	2–0	1–0
FCI Levadia U21	1–2	3–1	—	4–1	3–2	2–1	3–1	2–0	1–1	3–0
Flora U21	1–0	0–1	4–1	—	2–3	3–2	0–4	3–0	3–0	2–1
Harju	6–1	4–2	1–1	4–2	—	4–2	5–0	1–0	6–0	0–1
Nõmme United	2–2	1–1	0–6	2–0	3–2	—	1–3	1–1	2–0	0–2
Paide U21	4–0	1–2	3–0	0–6	1–5	3–1	—	3–0	7–1	2–0
Pärnu	0–1	1–1	1–1	0–0	0–0	0–1	1–6	—	1–2	2–3
Tulevik	0–5	0–1	0–2	1–1	1–1	2–6	0–5	2–1	—	0–3
Viimsi	5–0	8–1	1–3	2–1	2–2	1–0	4–3	1–1	3–0	—

Source: Estonian Football Association (in Estonian)
Legend: Blue = home team win; Yellow = draw; Red = away team win.

=== Matches 19–36 ===
Home \ Away	ALL	ELV	LEV	FLO	HAR	NÕM	PLM	PÄR	TUL	VII
Alliance	—	1–3	0–4	2–2	0–3	0–4	1–3	2–1	0–2	0–3
Elva	4–0	—	3–1	1–1	4–3	3–1	9–1	3–2	9–0	2–1
FCI Levadia U21	4–0	1–1	—	0–3	3–0	2–4	5–0	7–1	3–2	1–2
Flora U21	8–0	1–4	1–2	—	3–5	3–0	1–1	6–0	4–0	4–1
Harju	3–0	1–0	1–0	3–4	—	5–1	4–1	4–0	2–0	1–0
Nõmme United	4–1	2–0	0–2	3–2	4–1	—	4–1	3–0	4–0	1–1
Paide U21	1–4	2–0	1–4	1–2	2–4	0–5	—	0–2	3–2	1–3
Pärnu	6–0	0–1	2–1	3–2	1–2	0–2	1–3	—	1–3	1–7
Tulevik	5–0	0–1	1–1	0–4	0–5	0–7	2–4	0–0	—	1–0
Viimsi	6–1	4–1	1–0	0–1	0–1	0–2	5–0	2–0	3–0	—

Source: Estonian Football Association (in Estonian)
Legend: Blue = home team win; Yellow = draw; Red = away team win.

== Relegation play-offs ==
16 November 2022
19:00 (UTC+2)

Alliance	3–3	Tallinna Kalev U21
Velikanov 18', 55'; Torinava 28' (pen.)	Report	Jürisoo 33'; Loginov 61'; Planken 68'

Kohtla-Järve artificial turf, Kohtla-Järve
Attendance: 125
Referee: Kristjan Kattus
20 November 2022
12:00 (UTC+2)

Tallinna Kalev U21	0–1	Alliance
	Report	Kardava 83'

Kalev Keskstaadion artificial turf, Tallinn
Attendance: 79
Referee: Kristjan-Eric Lääne

Alliance won 4–3 on aggregate.

== Season statistics ==
=== Top scorers ===
Rank	Player	Club	Goals
1	(Estonia) Egert Õunapuu	Nõmme United	36
2	(Estonia) Andre Järva	Harju	20
3	(Estonia) Roman Sobtšenko	Harju	17
4	(Estonia) Nikita Dronov	FCI Levadia U21	16
4	(The Gambia) Bubacarr Tambedou	Paide Linnameeskond U21	16
6	(Estonia) Andre Paju	Elva	15
6	(Estonia) Aleksandr Šapovalov	Flora U21	15
8	(Estonia) Andreas Kiivit	Flora U21	14
9	(Estonia) Devid Lehter	Elva	13
9	(The Gambia) Ebrima Singhateh	Paide Linnameeskond U21	13
9	(Estonia) Ken-Marten Tammeveski	Viimsi	13

=== Hat-tricks ===
Player	For	Against	Result	Date
(The Gambia) Ebrima Singhateh	Paide Linnameeskond U21	Tulevik	5–3 (A)	7 March 2022
(Estonia) Egert Õunapuu	Nõmme United	Tulevik	7–1 (A)	19 March 2022
(Estonia) Karl Anton Sõerde	Viimsi	Elva	8–1 (H)	17 April 2022
(Estonia) Andreas Kiivit	Flora U21	Nõmme United	3–2 (H)	15 May 2022
(Estonia) Andre Järva^{4}	Harju	Paide Linnameeskond U21	5–0 (H)	19 May 2022
(Estonia) Nevil Krimm	Viimsi	Alliance	5–0 (H)	19 May 2022
(Estonia) Andreas Kiivit	Flora U21	Paide Linnameeskond U21	6–0 (A)	26 May 2022
(Estonia) Roman Sobtšenko	Harju	Elva	4–2 (H)	28 May 2022
(The Gambia) Ebrima Singhateh	Paide Linnameeskond U21	Tulevik	7–1 (H)	4 June 2022
(The Gambia) Bubacarr Tambedou	Paide Linnameeskond U21	Pärnu Jalgpalliklubi	6–1 (A)	19 June 2022
(Estonia) Nikita Dronov	FCI Levadia U21	Flora U21	4–1 (H)	30 June 2022
(Estonia) Ken-Marten Tammeveski	Viimsi	Alliance	6–1 (H)	16 July 2022
(Estonia) Andre Paju	Elva	Tulevik	9–0 (H)	6 August 2022
(Estonia) Devid Lehter^{4}	Elva	Alliance	4–0 (H)	20 August 2022
(Estonia) Gregor Lehtmets	Viimsi	Paide Linnameeskond U21	5–0 (H)	22 August 2022
(Estonia) Egert Õunapuu	Nõmme United	Ida-Virumaa FC Alliance	4–0 (A)	1 September 2022
(Estonia) Egert Õunapuu^{4}	Nõmme United	Tulevik	7–0 (A)	10 September 2022
(Estonia) Silver Õismets	Pärnu Jalgpalliklubi	Alliance	6–0 (H)	17 September 2022
(Estonia) Aleksandr Šapovalov^{4}	Flora U21	Alliance	8–0 (H)	2 October 2022
(Estonia) Egert Õunapuu	Nõmme United	Alliance	4–1 (H)	29 October 2022
(Estonia) Ken-Marten Tammeveski	Viimsi	Pärnu Jalgpalliklubi	7–1 (A)	30 October 2022
(Estonia) Karl Rudolf Õigus	FCI Levadia U21	Paide Linnameeskond U21	5–0 (H)	31 October 2022
(Estonia) Egert Õunapuu	Nõmme United	Paide Linnameeskond U21	5–0 (A)	5 November 2022

Notes

^{4} Player scored 4 goals
(H) – Home team
(A) – Away team

== Awards ==
=== Monthly awards ===
Month	Manager of the Month		Player of the Month	
Month	Manager	Club	Player	Club
March	(Estonia) Tauri Viik	Flora U21	(Estonia) Egert Õunapuu	Nõmme United
April	(Estonia) Meelis Rooba	Paide Linnameeskond U21	(Estonia) Murad Velijev	FCI Levadia U21
May	(Serbia) Ivan Stojković	FCI Levadia U21	(Estonia) Roman Sobtšenko	Harju
June/July	(Estonia) Veiko Haan	Elva	(Estonia) Karl Kruus	Elva
August	(Portugal) Victor Silva	Harju	(Estonia) Devid Lehter	Elva
September	(Estonia) Martin Klasen	Nõmme United	(Estonia) Egert Õunapuu	Nõmme United
October	(Portugal) Victor Silva	Harju	(Estonia) Ken-Marten Tammeveski	Viimsi

=== Esiliiga Player of the Season ===
Egert Õunapuu was named Esiliiga Player of the Year.
