= Egert Õunapuu =

Estonian footballer (born 2005)

Personal information
- Date of birth: 30 April 2005 (age 21)
- Place of birth: Tallinn, Estonia
- Height: 1.80 m (5 ft 11 in)
- Position: Striker

Team information
- Current team: Nõmme United
- Number: 9

Youth career
- 2012–2017: JK Sparta
- 2018–2023: Nõmme United

Senior career*
Years	Team	Apps	(Gls)
2020–	Nõmme United	112	(102)
2021–2026	Nõmme United U21	4	(4)

International career^{‡}
2021–2022	Estonia U17	10	(0)
2022–2023	Estonia U19	15	(3)
2023–	Estonia U21	3	(0)
- * Club domestic league appearances and goals as of 17 November 2026 ‡ National team caps and goals as of 8 September 2025

Egert Õunapuu (born 30 April 2005) is an Estonian professional footballer who plays as a striker for Meistriliiga club Nõmme United.

== Club career ==
Õunapuu is a youth academy graduate of Nõmme United. He made his senior team debut for the club on 23 August 2020 in a 3–0 league defeat to Vaprus. He scored 63 goals from 21 matches in the 2021 season of the under-17 Eliitliiga Esiliiga.

Õunapuu scored 32 goals from 24 matches in the 2023 Esiliiga, helping Nõmme United win the league and earn promotion to the Meistriliiga for the first time in the club's history. On 25 January 2024, Õunapuu signed a contract extension with Nõmme United until December 2026.

== International career ==
Õunapuu has represented Estonia at various youth levels. He scored his first goal for the Estonia under-19 team on 21 September 2022 in a 2–0 win against Italy.

== Personal life ==
Õunapuu is the older brother of footballer Bruno Õunapuu, who is also a youth academy graduate of Nõmme United.

== Career statistics ==
As of match played 31 October 2026

Appearances and goals by club, season and competition
Club	Season	League			Cup		Total	
Club	Season	Division	Apps	Goals	Apps	Goals	Apps	Goals
Nõmme United	2020	Esiliiga	2	0	0	0	2	0
Nõmme United	2021	Esiliiga	5	0	1	2	6	2
Nõmme United	2022	Esiliiga	26	36	1	0	27	36
Nõmme United	2023	Esiliiga	24	32	1	0	25	32
Nõmme United	2024	Meistriliiga	12	3	0	0	12	3
Nõmme United	2025	Esiliiga	19	23	3	2	22	25
Nõmme United	2026	Meistriliiga	23	8	2	2	25	10
Nõmme United	Total		111	102	8	6	119	108
Nõmme United U21	2021	III liiga	1	3	—		1	3
Nõmme United U21	2023	II liiga	1	1	—		1	1
Nõmme United U21	2024	II liiga	1	0	—		1	0
Nõmme United U21	2026	Esiliiga	1	0	—		1	0
Nõmme United U21	Total		4	4	0	0	4	4
Career total			115	106	8	6	123	112

== Honours ==
Nõmme United

- Esiliiga: 2023, 2025

Individual

- Esiliiga Player of the Year: 2022, 2023
- Esiliiga top scorer: 2022, 2023, 2025
- Esiliiga Player of the Month: March 2022, September 2022, August 2023, October 2023, July 2025
