= 2023 Esiliiga =

Estonian football league season for second division

Esiliiga
- Season: 2023
- Dates: 4 March 2023 – 3 December 2023
- Champions: Nõmme United
- Promoted: Nõmme United
- Relegated: Alliance; Legion

The 2023 Esiliiga was the 33rd season of the Esiliiga, the second tier of Estonian football. The season started on 4 March 2023 and concluded on 12 November 2023.

== Teams ==
=== Stadiums and locations ===
Locations of the 2023 Esiliiga teams

Team	Location	Stadium	Capacity
Alliance	Kiviõli	Kiviõli Arena	N/A
Elva	Elva	Elva linnastaadion	30
FCI Levadia U21	Tallinn	Maarjamäe Stadium	30
Flora U21	Tallinn	Sportland Arena	1,161
Legion	Tallinn	Sportland Arena	1,161
Nõmme United	Tallinn	Männiku Stadium	50
Paide Linnameeskond U21	Paide	Paide linnastaadion	500
Tabasalu	Tabasalu	Tabasalu Arena	1,630
Tallinn	Tallinn	Lasnamäe Sports Complex Stadium	88
Viimsi	Haabneeme	Viimsi Stadium	800

=== Personnel and kits ===
Team	Manager	Captain	Kit manufacturer	Shirt sponsor
Alliance	(Estonia) Erik Šteinberg		Adidas	Viru Keemia Grupp
Elva	(Estonia) Joonas Horn	(Estonia) Martin Thomson	Nike	Sportland
FCI Levadia U21	(Spain) Santi García	(Estonia) Igor Sokolov	Macron	Admirals, Viimsi Keevitus
Flora U21	(Estonia) Taavi Viik		Nike	
Legion	(Estonia) Denis Belov	(Estonia) Aleksandr Volodin	Uhlsport	
Nõmme United	(Estonia) Vladimir Vassiljev	(Estonia) Henri Leoke	Adidas	Apollo
Paide Linnameeskond U21	(Estonia) Kalmer Klettenberg		Nike	Exmet, Verston
Tabasalu	(Estonia) Risto Sarapik		Uhlsport	Eventtents, Rademar
Tallinn	(Estonia) Andrei Kalimullin	(Estonia) Albert Taar	Adidas	
Viimsi	(Estonia) Ivo Lehtmets		Joma	Assa Abloy

=== Managerial changes ===
Team	Outgoing manager	Manner of departure	Date of vacancy	Position in the table	Incoming manager	Date of appointment
FCI Levadia U21	(Russia) Nikita Andreev	Mutual consent	24 November 2022	Pre-season	(Spain) Santi García	24 November 2022
Nõmme United	(Estonia) Martin Klasen	Mutual consent	4 December 2022	Pre-season	(Estonia) Vladimir Vassiljev	4 December 2022
Paide Linnameeskond U21	(Estonia) Meelis Rooba	Mutual consent	9 December 2022	Pre-season	(Estonia) Kalmer Klettenberg	9 December 2022
Elva	(Estonia) Veiko Haan	Mutual consent	9 April 2023	10th	(Estonia) Joonas Horn	9 April 2023

== League table ==
Pos	Team	Pld	W	D	L	GF	GA	GD	Pts	Promotion, qualification or relegation
1	Nõmme United (C, P)	36	28	6	2	114	29	+85	90	Promotion to Meistriliiga
2	Viimsi	36	21	8	7	67	35	+32	71	Qualification for Meistriliiga play-off
3	Flora U21	36	22	3	11	86	53	+33	69	
4	FCI Levadia U21	36	16	9	11	57	46	+11	57	
5	Tabasalu	36	18	1	17	81	70	+11	55	
6	Tallinn	36	16	4	16	72	65	+7	52	
7	Paide Linnameeskond U21	36	12	5	19	66	82	−16	41	
8	Elva (O)	36	12	4	20	45	75	−30	40	Qualification for Esiliiga play-off
9	Legion (R)	36	5	6	25	37	97	−60	21	Relegation to Esiliiga B
10	Alliance (R)	36	6	2	28	50	123	−73	20	Relegation to Esiliiga B

Source: Esiliiga
Rules for classification: 1) Points; 2) Less matches awarded against; 3) Head-to-head points; 4) Head-to-head goal difference; 5) Matches won; 6) Goal difference; 7) Goals scored; 8) Away goals scored; 9) Fair-play points; 10) Draw
(C) Champions; (O) Play-off winners; (P) Promoted; (R) Relegated

== Results ==
Home \ Away	ALL	ELV	LEV	FLO	LEG	NÕM	PLM	TAB	TAL	VII	ALL	ELV	LEV	FLO	LEG	NÕM	PLM	TAB	TAL	VII
Alliance		1–2	2–6	3–2	1–0	0–6	1–7	2–5	2–3	2–6		2–0	1–2	1–3	3–4	1–3	2–5	4–2	1–5	1–3
Elva	3–0		1–2	2–1	3–2	0–2	0–3	2–3	1–1	1–3	3–0		0–0	1–4	0–0	0–7	1–0	3–0	4–3	0–1
FCI Levadia U21	4–0	5–1		1–2	1–2	1–0	2–0	2–1	1–1	0–0	2–2	3–0		0–0	4–0	0–3	2–2	1–2	0–0	2–4
Flora U21	6–1	2–1	0–2		5–2	3–6	3–3	3–2	1–0	3–1	6–0	2–0	3–1		2–1	0–3	1–2	7–3	2–1	1–2
Legion	1–0	0–3	1–2	0–6		0–6	2–2	2–1	3–2	0–3	1–1	1–4	0–0	0–4		0–5	2–4	1–4	2–3	0–1
Nõmme United	4–2	1–1	5–0	2–0	4–1		4–2	3–0	1–2	2–1	3–0	5–2	4–0	3–2	2–2		0–0	2–1	5–0	0–0
Paide Linnameeskond U21	2–3	6–2	1–2	0–1	2–0	1–3		0–5	0–1	2–2	1–3	0–1	2–1	1–4	3–2	1–8		0–1	1–0	3–1
Tabasalu	5–2	1–0	2–0	0–1	2–0	1–2	6–4		1–5	1–2	7–4	4–0	0–1	4–0	3–0	1–3	4–2		2–3	0–4
Tallinn	5–0	3–1	1–3	1–2	4–0	1–3	3–2	2–4		3–2	2–1	1–2	0–3	0–2	3–2	2–2	7–1	1–2		0–1
Viimsi	3–1	2–0	1–1	0–0	1–0	1–1	2–0	1–1	4–0		1–0	4–0	2–0	3–2	3–3	0–1	0–1	1–0	1–3	

Source: Flashscore
Legend: Blue = home team win; Yellow = draw; Red = away team win.

== Esiliiga play-off ==
The eighth-placed club (Elva) faced the fourth-placed club from the 2023 Esiliiga B (Tartu Kalev) for the final place in the following season's Esiliiga.

=== First leg ===
25 November 2023	Tartu Kalev	0–0	Elva	Tartu
10:30 BST				Stadium: Ülenurme Stadium

=== Second leg ===
29 November 2023	Elva	2–1 (a.e.t.) (2–1 agg.)	Tartu Kalev	Elva
16:00 BST	Lokk 90+3'; Reilson 99'		Peedo 6'	Stadium: Elva linnastaadion

== Season statistics ==
=== Top scorers ===
Rank	Player	Club	Goals
1	(Estonia) Egert Õunapuu	Nõmme United	32
2	(Estonia) Jevgeni Demidov	Nõmme United	25
2	(Estonia) Gregor Lehtmets	Viimsi	25
4	(Russia) Kirill Nesterov	Tallinn	18
5	(Estonia) Peeter Klein	Tabasalu	16
5	(Estonia) Henri Leoke	Nõmme United	16
5	(Estonia) Mihhail Orlov	Alliance	16
8	(Estonia) Joosep Põder	Tabasalu	15
9	(Estonia) Mait Eenmaa	Flora U21	14
9	(Estonia) Maksimilian Skvortsov	FCI Levadia U21	14

== Awards ==
=== Monthly awards ===
Month	Player of the Month		Manager of the Month	
Month	Player	Club	Manager	Club
March	(Estonia) Gregor Lehtmets	Viimsi	(Spain) Santi García	FCI Levadia U21
April	(Estonia) Jevgeni Demidov	Nõmme United	(Estonia) Vladimir Vassiljev	Nõmme United
May	(Estonia) Henri Leoke	Nõmme United	(Estonia) Taavi Viik	Flora U21
June/July	(Estonia) Maksimilian Skvortsov	FCI Levadia U21	(Estonia) Vladimir Vassiljev	Nõmme United
August	(Estonia) Egert Õunapuu	Nõmme United	(Estonia) Taavi Viik	Flora U21
September	(Estonia) Peeter Klein	Tabasalu	(Estonia) Ivo Lehtmets	Viimsi
October	(Estonia) Egert Õunapuu	Nõmme United	(Estonia) Ivo Lehtmets	Viimsi

=== Annual awards ===
The Esiliiga Player of the Year was awarded to Egert Õunapuu.
