= 2023 Meistriliiga =

32nd season of the Meistriliiga

Meistriliiga
- Season: 2023
- Champions: Flora
- Relegated: Harju
- Champions League: Flora
- Conference League: FCI Levadia; Paide Linnameeskond; Tallinna Kalev
- Matches: 180
- Goals: 458 (2.54 per match)
- Biggest home win: Flora 5–0 Narva Trans (14 March 2023); FCI Levadia 6–1 Harju (15 April 2023)
- Biggest away win: Vaprus 1–5 Flora (10 June 2023); Narva Trans 0–4 Vaprus (8 July 2023); Kuressaare 0–4 Paide Linnameeskond (23 July 2023)
- Highest scoring: Paide Linnameeskond 6–3 Tammeka (19 August 2023)
- Longest winning run: 7 matches Flora
- Longest unbeaten run: 12 matches Flora
- Longest winless run: 10 matches Harju
- Longest losing run: 8 matches Harju
- Highest attendance: 3,510; FCI Levadia 0–0 Flora (28 June 2023)
- Lowest attendance: 101; FCI Levadia 3–0 Tammeka (15 March 2023)

The 2023 Meistriliiga, also known as A. Le Coq Premium Liiga due to sponsorship reasons, was the 33rd season of the Meistriliiga, the top Estonian league for association football clubs since its establishment in 1992. It was the first Meistriliiga season with video assistant referee (VAR).

The winners (Flora, their second consecutive title and fifteenth overall) qualified for the 2024–25 Champions League first qualifying round. The runners-up (FCI Levadia), third-placed team (Tallinna Kalev), and fourth-placed team (Paide Linnameeskond) qualified for the 2024–25 Conference League first qualifying round. The ninth-placed team (Tammeka) qualified for the Meistriliiga play-off, winning to retain their place in the league. The bottom-placed team (Harju) were relegated to the 2024 Esiliiga.

== Teams ==
The league consisted of ten teams; the top nine teams of the previous season, and one team promoted from the Esiliiga. Flora entered the season as defending champions.

=== Team changes ===
Promoted from 2022 Esiliiga	Relegated to 2023 Esiliiga
Harju	Legion

=== Stadiums and locations ===
Locations of the 2023 Meistriliiga teams

Team	Location	Stadium	Capacity
FCI Levadia	Tallinn	A. Le Coq Arena	14,336
Flora	Tallinn	A. Le Coq Arena	14,336
Harju	Laagri	Laagri Stadium	500
Kuressaare	Kuressaare	Kuressaare linnastaadion	1,000
Narva Trans	Narva	Narva Kreenholm Stadium	1,065
Nõmme Kalju	Tallinn	TNTK Stadium	800
Paide Linnameeskond	Paide	Paide linnastaadion	500
Tallinna Kalev	Tallinn	Kadriorg Stadium	5,000
Tammeka	Tartu	Tartu Tamme Stadium	1,500
Vaprus	Pärnu	Pärnu Rannastaadion	1,501

=== Personnel and kits ===
Team	Manager	Captain	Kit manufacturer	Shirt sponsor
FCI Levadia	(Spain) Curro Torres	(Estonia) Rasmus Peetson	Macron	Admirals, Viimsi Keevitus
Flora	(Estonia) Jürgen Henn	(Estonia) Konstantin Vassiljev	Nike	Optibet
Harju	(Portugal) Victor Silva	(Estonia) Andre Järva	Adidas	Enemat
Kuressaare	(Ukraine) Roman Kozhukhovskyi	(Estonia) Märten Pajunurm	Nike	Visit Saaremaa
Narva Trans	(Russia) Aleksei Eremenko	(Ivory Coast) Irié	Nike	Sportland
Nõmme Kalju	(Russia) Nikita Andreev	(France) Yohan Mannone	Adidas	Marsbet
Paide Linnameeskond	(Serbia) Ivan Stojković	(Estonia) Andre Frolov	Nike	Exmet, Verston
Tallinna Kalev	(Estonia) Aivar Anniste (Estonia) Daniel Meijel	(Estonia) Marek Kaljumäe	Macron	Unibet
Tammeka	(Estonia) Marti Pähn	(Estonia) Taijo Teniste	Nike	Giga Ehitus
Vaprus	(Estonia) Igor Prins	(Estonia) Magnus Villota	Nike	Coolbet

=== Managerial changes ===
Team	Outgoing manager	Manner of departure	Date of vacancy	Position in the table	Incoming manager	Date of appointment
Vaprus	(Latvia) Dmitrijs Kalašņikovs	End of contract	12 November 2022	Pre-season	(Estonia) Igor Prins	14 November 2022
FCI Levadia	(Russia) Nikita Andreev	End of interim spell	1 December 2022	Pre-season	(Spain) Curro Torres	1 December 2022
Narva Trans	(Russia) Aleksei Yagudin	End of interim spell	31 December 2022	Pre-season	(Estonia) Sergei Terehhov	31 December 2022
Nõmme Kalju	(Estonia) Kaido Koppel	Contract terminated	28 April 2023	4th	(Russia) Nikita Andreev	28 April 2023
Paide Linnameeskond	(Estonia) Karel Voolaid	Contract terminated	25 May 2023	7th	(Estonia) Ats Sillaste (interim)	27 May 2023
Paide Linnameeskond	(Estonia) Ats Sillaste	End of interim spell	30 May 2023	7th	(Serbia) Ivan Stojković	30 May 2023
Narva Trans	(Estonia) Sergei Terehhov	Contract terminated	8 August 2023	8th	(Estonia) Valeri Bondarenko (interim)	11 August 2023
Narva Trans	(Estonia) Valeri Bondarenko	End of interim spell	20 August 2023	8th	(Russia) Aleksei Eremenko	20 August 2023

== League table ==
Pos	Team	Pld	W	D	L	GF	GA	GD	Pts	Qualification or relegation
1	Flora (C)	36	23	10	3	74	24	+50	79	Qualification for the Champions League first qualifying round
2	FCI Levadia	36	22	11	3	67	24	+43	77	Qualification for the Conference League first qualifying round (Note: The 2023–24 Estonian Cup winners also qualified for the Conference League first qualifying round. Since the cup winners (FCI Levadia) qualified based on league position, the Conference League spot was passed to the fourth-placed team.)
3	Tallinna Kalev	36	14	11	11	49	41	+8	53 (Note: Head-to-head points: Tallinna Kalev 8, Paide Linnameeskond 2.)	Qualification for the Conference League first qualifying round
4	Paide Linnameeskond	36	13	14	9	50	34	+16	53	Qualification for the Conference League first qualifying round
5	Nõmme Kalju	36	12	13	11	50	42	+8	49	
6	Vaprus	36	12	12	12	40	43	−3	48	
7	Kuressaare	36	12	7	17	36	60	−24	43	
8	Narva Trans	36	12	2	22	32	64	−32	38	
9	Tammeka (O)	36	5	12	19	33	65	−32	27	Qualification for the Meistriliiga play-off
10	Harju (R)	36	5	8	23	27	61	−34	23	Relegation to the Esiliiga

Source: Premium Liiga, Soccerway
Rules for classification: 1) Points; 2) Less matches awarded against; 3) Head-to-head points; 4) Head-to-head goal difference; 5) Matches won; 6) Goal difference; 7) Goals scored; 8) Away goals scored; 9) Fair-play points; 10) Draw
(C) Champions; (O) Play-off winners; (R) Relegated

== Results ==
Home \ Away	LEV	FLO	HAR	KUR	NAR	NÕM	PLM	KAL	TAM	VAP	LEV	FLO	HAR	KUR	NAR	NÕM	PLM	KAL	TAM	VAP
FCI Levadia	—	0–0	6–1	4–1	3–0	2–1	2–0	2–1	3–0	0–0	—	2–1	1–1	4–0	3–0	3–0	1–0	1–1	2–1	0–0
Flora	0–2	—	4–0	4–0	5–0	3–1	0–0	3–0	1–1	4–0	2–2	—	2–0	3–0	1–4	0–0	2–1	1–0	3–0	1–1
Harju	2–1	0–1	—	1–1	1–2	1–2	0–1	0–2	2–3	1–2	0–1	2–3	—	1–1	0–2	1–0	0–1	0–2	3–0	0–4
Kuressaare	0–2	1–4	1–1	—	3–0	2–0	1–4	1–2	3–1	1–2	2–1	0–3	1–1	—	1–0	0–2	0–4	1–1	1–1	1–0
Narva Trans	0–2	0–1	2–0	0–1	—	0–2	0–0	2–1	2–0	0–2	0–1	1–3	1–3	2–0	—	2–1	1–3	2–1	2–0	0–4
Nõmme Kalju	0–1	2–2	1–1	2–0	2–0	—	1–1	1–2	1–2	1–0	4–3	0–0	1–0	4–1	4–0	—	3–3	1–2	4–1	1–1
Paide Linnameeskond	1–1	1–3	1–0	0–1	2–1	0–0	—	0–1	0–0	0–1	2–2	0–0	4–0	1–0	1–2	2–0	—	1–1	6–3	3–0
Tallinna Kalev	0–2	0–2	1–1	0–3	0–1	0–0	1–1	—	1–1	1–1	1–2	1–1	2–1	1–3	5–0	1–1	2–1	—	1–1	1–0
Tammeka	2–2	0–3	2–0	0–0	1–1	0–2	0–0	1–2	—	2–3	0–0	1–2	2–1	0–1	3–0	1–1	1–2	2–7	—	0–0
Vaprus	0–0	1–5	0–1	1–2	1–0	1–1	2–2	0–2	1–0	—	0–3	0–1	0–0	3–1	3–2	3–3	1–1	0–2	2–0	—

Source: Soccerway
Legend: Blue = home team win; Yellow = draw; Red = away team win.

== Meistriliiga play-off ==
The ninth-placed club (Tammeka) faced the second-placed club from the 2023 Esiliiga (Viimsi) for the final place in the following season's Meistriliiga.

=== First leg ===
29 November 2023	Viimsi	0–5	Tammeka	Tallinn
16:00 BST			Adebayo 11', 37'; Uggeri 46'; Tammik 64'; Laaneots 89'	Stadium: Sportland Arena; Attendance: 375

=== Second leg ===
3 December 2023	Tammeka	1–1 (6–1 agg.)	Viimsi	Tartu
10:30 BST	Adebayo 71'		Lehtmets 20'	Stadium: Tartu Annemõisa Jalgpallihall; Attendance: 140

== Season statistics ==
=== Top scorers ===
Rank	Player	Club	Goals
1	(Estonia) Tristan Koskor	Narva Trans	16
2	(Estonia) Konstantin Vassiljev	Flora	14
3	(Cameroon) Mollo	FCI Levadia	13
4	(Estonia) Sergei Zenjov	Flora	12
5	(Ghana) Ernest Agyiri	FCI Levadia	11
6	(Estonia) Kevin Mätas	Tammeka	10
6	(Estonia) Tristan Toomas Teeväli	Tallinna Kalev	10
8	(Estonia) Sten Reinkort	Flora/Kuressaare	9
9	(Mali) Bourama Fomba	FCI Levadia	8
9	(Estonia) Kevin Kauber	Vaprus	8
9	(Estonia) Mattias Männilaan	Kuressaare	8
9	(The Gambia) Foday Trawally	Tallinna Kalev	8

=== Hat-tricks ===
Player	For	Against	Result	Date
(Ghana) Ernest Agyiri	FCI Levadia	Nõmme Kalju	3–0 (H)	9 July 2023
(Estonia) Herol Riiberg	Paide Linnameeskond	Tammeka	6–3 (H)	19 August 2023

=== Average attendance ===
Club	Average attendance
FCI Levadia	750
Pärnu JK Vaprus	664
Tallinna FC Flora	530
JK Tallinna Kalev	374
Tartu JK Tammeka	333
Paide Linnameeskond	309
Nõmme Kalju FC	294
Harju JK Laagri	285
JK Narva Trans	221
FC Kuressaare	196
League average	396

== Awards ==
=== Monthly awards ===
Month	Player of the Month		Manager of the Month	
Month	Manager	Club	Player	Club
March	(Estonia) Uku Kõrre	Vaprus	(Estonia) Igor Prins	Vaprus
April	(Ghana) Ernest Agyiri	FCI Levadia	(Spain) Curro Torres	FCI Levadia
May	(Estonia) Sergei Zenjov	Flora	(Estonia) Jürgen Henn	Flora
June/July	(The Gambia) Ebrima Jarju	Paide Linnameeskond	(Spain) Curro Torres	FCI Levadia
August	(Trinidad and Tobago) Andre Fortune II	Nõmme Kalju	(Russia) Nikita Andreev	Nõmme Kalju
September	(Cameroon) Mollo	FCI Levadia	(Portugal) Victor Silva	Harju
October	(Estonia) Konstantin Vassiljev	Flora	(Estonia) Aivar Anniste (Estonia) Daniel Meijel	Tallinna Kalev

=== Annual awards ===
Award	Winner	Club
Player of the Season	(Estonia) Konstantin Vassiljev	Flora
Goalkeeper of the Season	(Estonia) Karl Andre Vallner	FCI Levadia
Defender of the Season	(Mali) Bourama Fomba	FCI Levadia
Midfielder of the Season	(Estonia) Konstantin Vassiljev	Flora
Forward of the Season	(Cameroon) Mollo	FCI Levadia
Under-21 Player of the Season	(Cameroon) Mollo	FCI Levadia
Goal of the Season	(Estonia) Mark Maksimkin	Narva Trans
