= Jani Sarajärvi =

Finnish footballer (born 1979)

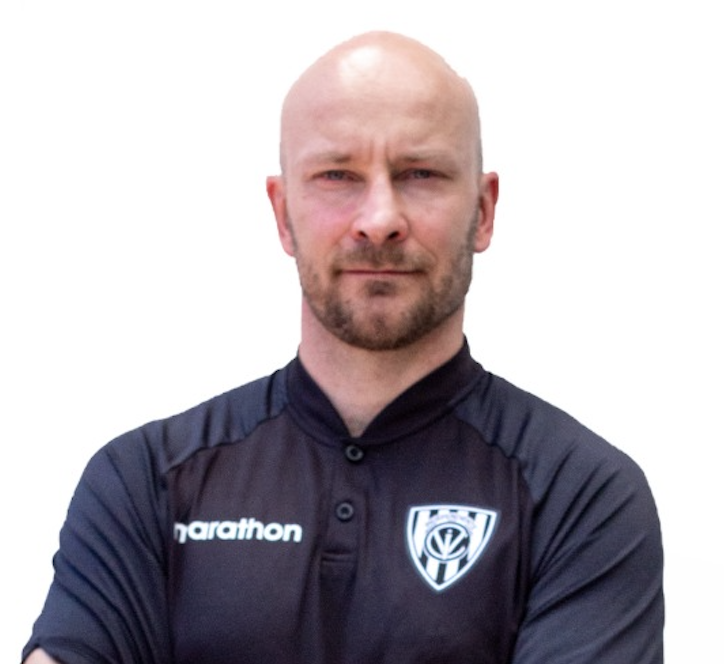
- Sarajärvi at Independiente del Valle

Personal information
- Full name: Jani Sarajärvi
- Date of birth: 9 September 1979 (age 47)
- Place of birth: Pudasjärvi, Finland
- Position: Defender

Team information
- Current team: Estonia national under-21 football team

Senior career*
Years	Team	Apps	(Gls)
2000–2001	VPS	49	(5)
2002–2003	IFK Norrköping	29	(0)
2003–2005	AC Allianssi	47	(3)
2006	Jaro	16	(0)
2007–2008	TPS	17	(1)
2009–2010	Jaro	17	(0)
2011	YPA	25	(0)

International career^{‡}
2000-2001	Finland U21	8	(0)
2005	Finland	1	(0)

Managerial career
- 2013-2014: YPA
- 2016-2017: VPS (assistant)
- 2019: HJK (assistant)
- 2020: Independiente del Valle (assistant)
- 2021–2024: Gambia (coach-analyst)
- 2024: Nõmme United
- 2024: Philippines (coach-analyst)
- 2024-2025: Mali (coach-analyst)
- 2025-: Estonia national under-21 football team
- * Club domestic league appearances and goals as of 8 October 2009 ‡ National team caps and goals as of 9 September 2009

Jani Sarajärvi (born 9 September 1979 in Pudasjärvi) is a Finnish professional football manager who is currently working as the head coach of the Estonia national under-21 football team and the Head of Youth National Teams. Sarajärvi, a former pro player, has previously held head or assistant coaching positions in three continents, both in premier club level and national team settings. He also holds a PhD from the University of Lisbon.

== Club career ==
Sarajärvi's professional playing career lasted 11 years and during this time he played in Veikkausliiga and Allsvenskan, earning one senior cap for Finland national team and eight for under-21 national team. He won silver and bronze in Veikkausliiga, silver in Finnish cup, and three Finnish League cups.

Upon retiring in 2010, Sarajärvi began his coaching career as a player-assistant coach at FC YPA in Finnish third tier 2011, later returning to the club as a head coach for years 2013–14. After that, Sarajärvi has worked for VPS and HJK in Finland, Independiente del Valle in Ecuador, and The Gambia national team.

== Coaching career ==
=== FC YPA ===
After a pro playing career, Sarajärvi started his professional coaching career in FC YPA at Finnish third tier, working as a head coach in 2013-14 (after first playing and assistant coaching in the same team season 2011).

Sarajärvi is FC YPA's most successful coach ever. The team gained +90% and +107% more points during respective two years in reign compared to the season before his employment. These records have still not been broken. Sarajärvi also coached the club's futsal team Sievi Futsal in Finnish futsal league, leading the team to its first ever league medal (bronze). Sarajärvi has later commented on the benefits of futsal for football coaching.

=== VPS ===
Years 2016–17, Sarajärvi worked as an assistant coach for VPS in Veikkausliiga. In their 1st season, in a staff led by Head Coach Petri Vuorinen, Sarajärvi helped the team to establish a new more active playing style and gain 61% more points compared to season 2015, when the club almost relegated. The team went through total rejuvenation and won a UEFA Europa League qualification place, finishing 4th in the league, with 2nd least goals allowed.

Also season 2017 got a successful start, as VPS held on the 2nd place still in the middle of the season. The team also went on to surprise the favorites of NK Olimpija Ljubljana in the UEFA Europa League qualification, winning 1-0 both home and away. In the 2nd qualification round, VPS met the Danish giant Bröndby IF, VPS lost away 0-2 but held on to surprise at home, finally winning only 2–1, and was knocked out of the competition.

In the middle of the season 2017, Sarajärvi announced that he would pursue a PhD degree in football coaching at University of Lisbon and was leaving the club after the season.

=== HJK ===
Late 2018, Mika Lehkosuo, one of the most renowned football coaches ever in Finland, persuaded Sarajärvi to Finland and assist him in Finnish giant club HJK for the season 2019. As the most successful club in Finland, the goal was to win a double and to qualify either to UEFA Champions or Europa League. Lehkosuo and Sarajärvi set to develop the team and playing style to reach the targets. Pre-season started well with a good performance against the Scottish giant Glasgow Rangers (loss 2–3) and a 3–1 win against top Swedish club Hammarby IF. The regular season started also well with two wins but underperformance in the next eight games (6 draws and two losses) lead to sacking of the head coach Mika Lehkosuo. Sarajärvi's contract would have run until the end of season, but he decided to step out as a mark of loyalty for his head coach.

=== Independiente del Valle ===
For the year 2020, Sarajärvi was contracted by Independiente del Valle, for an assistant coach role in the club's 2nd team full of Ecuadorian youth national team players. Led by the head coach Yuri Solano, the goal was to develop the young players into 1st team and help them towards international careers. The team went on to win Copa Libertadores U20 as a first ever Ecuadorian team, beating clubs such as CR Flamengo in the semi-final and River Plate in the final. Three of the players from that team, namely Moisés Caicedo, Piero Hincapié, and Willian Pacho, later played in the senior national team of Ecuador at World Cup of Qatar 2022. The team also competed in the Ecuadorian Serie B, but the season was ended because of COVID-19 outbreak. After spending a few months in heavy isolation, Sarajärvi returned to Lisbon, Portugal, for his PhD studies.

=== The Gambia national team ===
After an invitation from head coach Tom Saintfiet, in November 2021 Sarajärvi agreed for a coach-analyst role in The Gambia national team. Sarajärvi started to work with the team during preparation for AFCON 2021 tournament, where the team had qualified for the first time ever in the country's history. In the AFCON group phase, The Gambia surprised everyone by wins over Tunisia and Mauritania and a draw against Mali. The surprises continued in the round of 16 with a 1–0 win over Guinea, but the tournament came to an end in a quarter-final match against Cameroon (0-2). After AFCON 2021, Sarajärvi continues as a coach-analyst for The Gambia national team. The team is currently in the qualification stage for the AFCON 2023 in group G with Mali, Congo and South Sudan.

=== FC Nõmme United ===
On 30 December 2023, newly promoted Estonian club FC Nõmme United announced that they had named Sarajärvi the new head coach on a two-year deal. Sarajärvi also announced that he will continue his work with the Gambia national team as an analyst from distance, until the delayed AFCON 2023 tournament, according to his previous contract.

== Education ==
Sarajärvi has completed High-Performance Football Coaching course at University of Lisbon with teachers such as José Mourinho and Pedro Caixinha. He holds UEFA Pro coaching license from the Lithuanian Football Federation.

Sarajärvi holds a PhD from the University of Lisbon, a school that has educated coaches as Mourinho, Caixinha, and Ruben Amorim. His main research areas are high-performance coaching, game analysis, and football skill.
