= Vladimir Vassiljev =

Estonian football manager (born 1988)

Personal information
- Date of birth: 13 February 1988 (age 38)
- Place of birth: Dukat, Soviet Union

Managerial career
- Years: Team
- 2016–2019: Levadia (U21)
- 2019–2020: Levadia (U17)
- 2019: Levadia (interim)
- 2020–2022: Levadia
- 2022–2023: Nõmme United
- 2023–2025: ŠTK 1914 Šamorín
- 2025–2026: Paide
- 2026: Liepāja

Vladimir Vassiljev (born 13 February 1988) is an Estonian professional football manager who most recently managed Liepāja.

== Early life ==
Vassiljev was born in 1988 in the Far East region of Russia, in Dukat. As a footballer, he played 25 matches in the Estonian top division. Vassiljev attended Tallinn University of Technology in Estonia, where he studied business information technology.

== Career ==
Vassiljev began his coaching career at the youth system of Estonian club Levadia. In September 2019, he was appointed caretaker head coach following Aleksndar Rogić's departure and served another caretaker spell in 2020 following Martin Reim's departure, before being appointed as permanent head coach. In 2021, Levadia established a coaching partnership between Vassiljev and Marko Savić. The pair led the club to the Meistriliiga title in 2021, ending a seven-year title drought, and also won the Estonian Cup and the Estonian Supercup. The partnership ended in the summer of 2022 following the club's unsuccessful European campaign.

For the 2023 season, he was appointed manager of Estonian second tier side Nõmme United, and led them to winning the league title and promotion.

In December 2023, Vassiljev signed as head coach for Slovak second division club ŠTK Šamorín.

In 2025, Vassiljev returned to Estonia to become head coach of Paide Linnameeskond. He was dismissed in April 2026.

On 1 June 2026, Vassiljev was appointed head coach of Latvian Higher League club Liepāja, but was dismissed from the role less the three months later.

== Honours ==
Levadia

- Meistriliiga: 2021
- Estonian Cup: 2020–21
- Estonian Supercup: 2022

Nõmme United

- Esiliiga: 2023

Individual

- Meistriliiga Manager of the Month: May 2022
