= FC Nõmme United =

Association football club in Estonia

Nõmme United
- Full name: Jalgpalliklubi FC Nõmme United
- Founded: 2000; 26 years ago
- Ground: Männiku Stadium
- Capacity: 500
- President: Mart Poom
- Manager: Eric Wynalda
- League: Meistriliiga
- 2026: Meistriliiga, 8th of 10
- Website: http://www.fcnommu.ee/
Home colours	Away colours

FC Nõmme United is an Estonian professional football club based in Nõmme, a district in Tallinn. The club was founded in 2000 and competes in the Meistriliiga, the top flight of Estonian football, following promotion from the 2025 Esiliiga as league champions. The club's home ground is Männiku Stadium.

Led by Mart Poom, Nõmme United is renowned for its strong youth system. The club debuted in Meistriliiga in 2024 and will compete in the top flight again from 2026.

== History ==
=== Early history (2000–2018) ===
The club was founded in 2000 by Enn Loog and was initially named FC Elion, before the name was changed to FC Nõmme United in 2006. From early years on, Mart Poom, who at the time was playing in the Premier League, contributed to the growth of the club. After Poom's retirement, Mart Poomi Jalgpallikool (English: Mart Poom's Football School) was founded which started to act as an academy to Nõmme United. The club quickly established itself as one of the leading youth academies in the country, whilst the first team spent 13 consecutive seasons in the fourth tier from 2005 to 2017. In 2018, goalkeeper Karl Jakob Hein joined the academy of Arsenal F.C. and made his first team debut on 9 November 2022, becoming the second Estonian to feature for the Gunners after club's president Poom.

=== Rise to top flight football (2019–present) ===
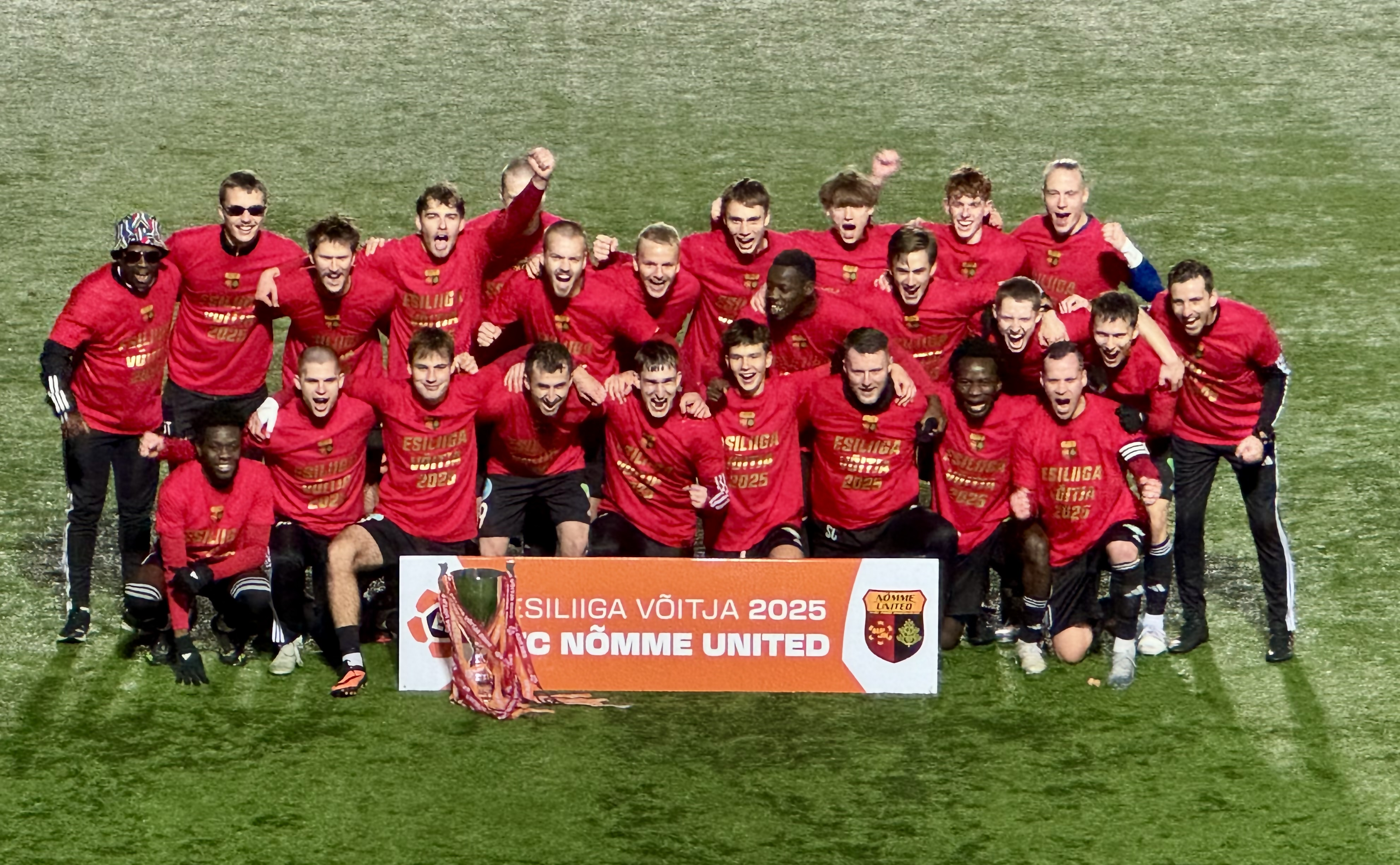
Nõmme United with the 2025 second tier title

After finishing first in the Estonian third-tier Esiliiga B in 2019, the club was promoted to Esiliiga. After the 2022 season, Vladimir Vassiljev became the manager of the club and Nõmme United set their sights on gaining promotion to Premium Liiga within the next three seasons. They did it in one, as the club finished the 2023 Esiliiga season in first place with 90 points. After the end of the season, Vassiljev left for abroad and Nõmme United appointed Jani Sarajärvi as head coach for their debut in the Estonian top flight, but the Finnishman was dismissed just four games into the season. The team was first led by assistant coaches and then by Martin Klasen for the remainder of the year. Although Nõmme United had the joint-fourth highest budget in the league, the club finished their inaugural Premium Liiga season in last place with 15 points, and were relegated.

Nõmme United won promotion back to top flight at their first attempt as the 2025 Esiliiga champions with league record 92 points.

== Kit manufacturers and shirt sponsors ==
Period	Kit manufacturer	Shirt sponsor	Ref
2015–2022	Uhlsport	Apollo	
2023	Adidas	Apollo	
2024–	Adidas	TonyBet	

== Stadium ==
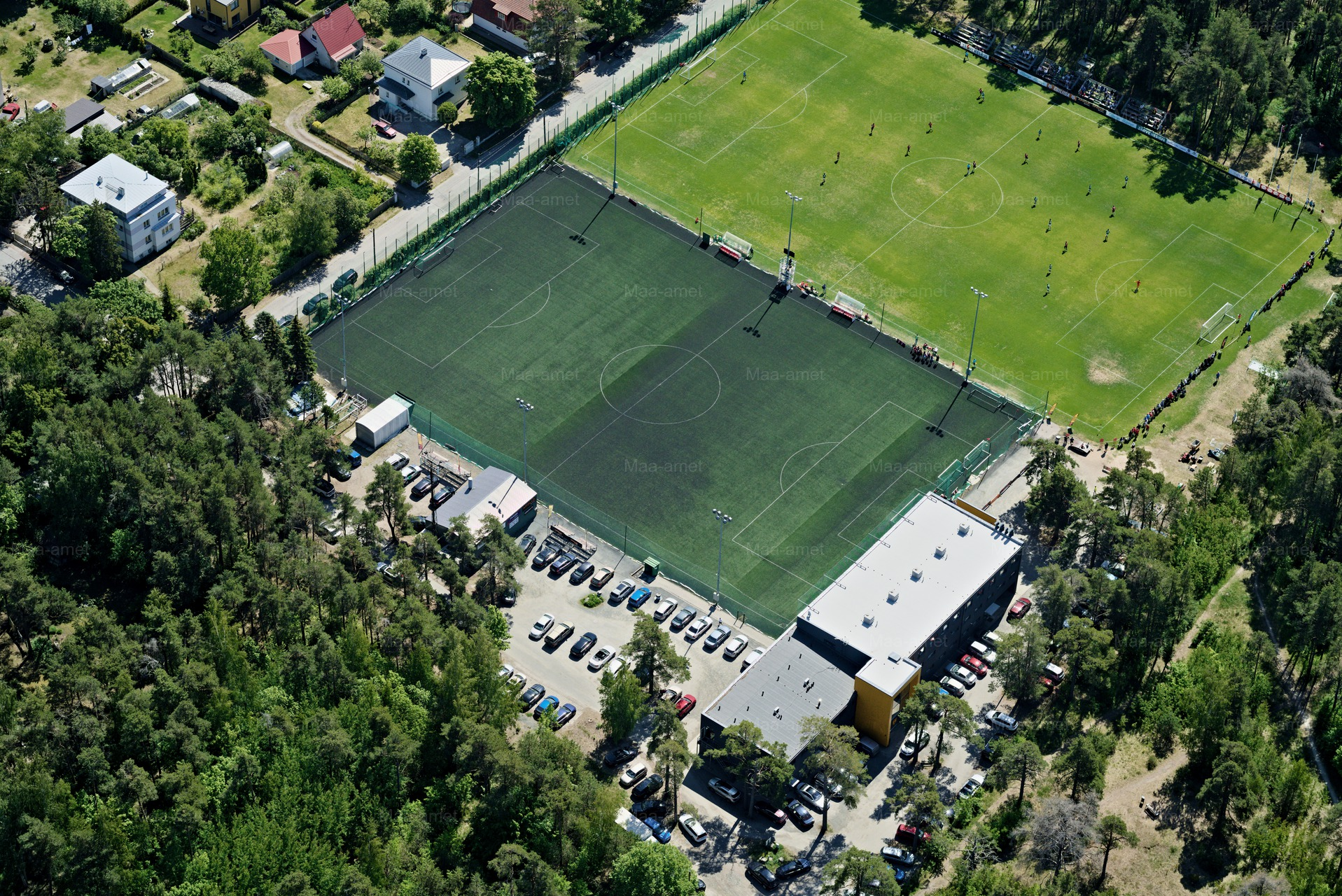
Nõmme United's home base and stadium

Nõmme United's home ground is Männiku Stadium which is part of their home base Männiku Football Centre, located at Võidu 16, Nõmme, Tallinn. In addition to the natural grass ground, the complex also has an artificial turf football pitch (90 × 60m), upon which an air dome is installed during the winter months.

At winter and early spring months, Nõmme United play their home matches at Sportland Arena.

== Rivalries ==
=== Nõmme Derby ===
Nõmme United has a local rivalry with Nõmme Kalju FC, as both clubs are based in the Nõmme district of Tallinn. Their home grounds Männiku Stadium and Hiiu Stadium are located approximately 3 km apart. For the first decades, the rivalry only existed in youth football, until Nõmme United’s promotion to the Estonian top division saw the clubs face each other for the first time on 17 March 2024. The second-ever Nõmme Derby saw the second-fastest goal in Meistriliiga history, as Promise David opened the score for Nõmme Kalju after just 7 seconds.

== Players ==
=== First-team squad ===
As of 23 October 2026.

Note: Flags indicate national team as defined under FIFA eligibility rules; some limited exceptions apply. Players may hold more than one non-FIFA nationality.

No.	Pos.	Nation	Player
1	GK	EST	Georg Mattias Lagus
3	DF	EST	Samuel Merilai
6	DF	EST	Mathias Palts
7	MF	PUR	Adyn Torres (on loan from Atlanta United)
8	MF	EST	Bruno Vain
9	FW	EST	Egert Õunapuu
10	MF	EST	Andre Frolov (captain)
11	FW	ZAM	Benjamine Chisala
13	MF	EST	Artjom Truuväärt
14	MF	EST	Nikita Vassiljev
15	FW	USA	Tristin Evans
16	MF	GHA	Dacosta Owusu

No.	Pos.	Nation	Player
19	MF	EST	Ivan Krasnov
20	FW	EST	Kevin Mätas
23	DF	EST	Karl Läänelaid
24	MF	EST	Gert Kabal
26	MF	NED	Koen Oostenbrink
27	DF	EST	Mairo Miil
45	DF	EST	Henri Järvelaid
49	MF	GEO	Zakaria Beglarishvili
50	DF	SUI	Simon Geiger
52	MF	EST	Tristan Vendelin
55	DF	ZAM	Ricky Chanda
71	GK	EST	Gregor Pürg

== Personnel ==
=== Current technical staff ===
Position	Name
Head coach	(United States) Eric Wynalda
Assistant coach	(South Africa) Thabiso Makhetha
Goalkeeping coach	(Japan) Kaito Hayashi
Video analyst	(Estonia) Sander Valdre
Fitness coach	(Estonia) Marten Metsniit
Physiotherapist	(Estonia) Johan Tõugjas
Management
President	(Estonia) Mart Poom
Board member	(Estonia) Ivar Vendelin
Chief Executive Officer	(Estonia) Martin Klasen
Scout	(Estonia) Sander Valdre

=== Managerial history ===
Dates	Name
2010–2012	(Estonia) Tarmo Rüütli
2013–2015	(Estonia) Erki Kesküla
2016–2022	(Estonia) Martin Klasen
2023	(Estonia) Vladimir Vassiljev
2024	(Finland) Jani Sarajärvi
2024	(Estonia) Randin Rande (Ecuador) Juan Martínez (interims)
2024	(Estonia) Martin Klasen
2025–2026	(Poland) Sławomir Cisakowski
2026–	(United States) Eric Wynalda

== Honours ==
=== League ===
- Esiliiga
  - Winners (2): 2023, 2025
- Esiliiga B
  - Winners (1): 2019

== Statistics ==
=== League and Cup ===
Season	Division	Pos	Pld	W	D	L	GF	GA	GD	Pts	Top goalscorer	Cup	Notes
2000	V liiga E	2	20	14	6	0	54	16	+36	48	(Estonia) Ivar Sova (12)		as Eesti Telefoni SK
2001	IV liiga E	1	18	16	2	1	103	16	+87	47	(Estonia) Jaanus Juhalu (28)		as Eesti Telefoni SK
2002	III liiga N	5	18	8	2	8	32	33	−1	26	(Estonia) Ivar Sova (10)		as Eesti Telefoni SK
2003	III liiga N	3	18	11	4	3	55	28	+27	37	(Estonia) Ivar Sova (Estonia) Jaanus Juhalu (9)		as Eesti Telefoni SK
2004	III liiga N	1	18	12	3	3	54	14	+40	39	(Estonia) Jaanus Juhalu (13)		as FC Elion
2005	II liiga S/W	3	28	16	4	8	67	51	+16	52	(Estonia) Ivar Sova (13)		as FC Elion
2006	II liiga S/W	4	28	15	6	7	68	44	+22	51	(Estonia) Ivar Sova (22)		as FC Nõmme United
2007	II liiga S/W	9	26	10	1	15	72	84	−12	31	(Estonia) Ivar Sova (21)	Third round	as FC Nõmme United
2008	II liiga S/W	2	26	18	1	7	72	36	+36	55	(Estonia) Ivar Sova (25)	–	as FC Nõmme United
2009	II liiga S/W	1	26	18	4	4	100	31	+69	58	(Estonia) Ivar Sova (39)	Second round	as FC Nõmme United
2010	II liiga S/W	3	26	14	5	7	67	52	+15	47	(Estonia) Sander Lepik (20)	Fourth round	as FC Nõmme United
2011	II liiga S/W	7	26	13	2	11	55	56	−1	41	(Estonia) Alex Jelagin (Estonia) Raido Reinsalu (17)	Fourth round	as FC Nõmme United
2012	II liiga S/W	14	26	3	2	21	25	113	−88	11	(Estonia) Henri Rüütli (Estonia) Roland Mäe (5)	First round	as FC Nõmme United
2013	II liiga S/W	4	26	15	1	10	90	60	+30	46	(Estonia) Sander Lepik (25)	Second round	as FC Nõmme United
2014	II liiga S/W	9	26	9	1	15	69	75	−6	28	(Estonia) Sander Lepik (21)	Third round	as FC Nõmme United
2015	II liiga S/W	4	26	14	5	7	88	41	+47	47	(Estonia) Ander Ott Valge (26)	Second round	as FC Nõmme United
2016	II liiga S/W	3	26	19	3	4	131	38	+93	60	(Estonia) Kevin Mätas (49)	Fourth round	as FC Nõmme United
2017	II liiga S/W	1	26	23	2	1	158	18	+140	71	(Estonia) Mark Kolosov (52)	Second round	as FC Nõmme United
2018	Esiliiga B	5	36	17	9	10	100	57	+43	60	(Estonia) Pavel Fedorenko (20)	First round	as FC Nõmme United
2019	Esiliiga B	1	36	27	4	5	118	38	+80	85	(Estonia) Oliver Jürgens (28)	Second round	as FC Nõmme United
2020	Esiliiga	3	32	16	7	9	76	43	+33	55	(Estonia) Kevin Mätas (22)	Second round	as FC Nõmme United
2021	Esiliiga	4	30	12	5	13	79	67	+12	41	(Estonia) Robi Saarma (28)	First round	as FC Nõmme United
2022	Esiliiga	6	36	18	6	12	79	56	+23	60	(Estonia) Egert Õunapuu (36)	Third round	as FC Nõmme United
2023	Esiliiga	1	36	28	6	2	114	29	+85	90	(Estonia) Egert Õunapuu (32)	Third round	as FC Nõmme United
2024	Meistriliiga	10	36	2	9	25	22	79	–57	15	(Ukraine) Oleksandr Musolitin (Estonia) Egert Õunapuu (3)	Fourth round	as FC Nõmme United
2025	Esiliiga	1	36	30	2	4	125	27	+98	92	(Estonia) Egert Õunapuu (23)	Third round	as FC Nõmme United
