= 2020 Esiliiga =

Estonian football league season for second division

Esiliiga
- Season: 2020
- Dates: 5 March 2020 – 29 November 2020
- Champions: Vaprus
- Promoted: Vaprus
- Relegated: Vändra; Järve
- Top goalscorer: Kevin Mätas (22 goals)
- Biggest home win: Pärnu Jalgpalliklubi 11–0 Järve (23 August 2020)
- Biggest away win: Järve 1–8 Nõmme United (3 October 2020)
- Highest scoring: Pärnu Jalgpalliklubi 11–0 Järve (23 August 2020)

The 2020 Esiliiga was the 30th season of the Esiliiga, the second tier of Estonian football. The season started on 5 March 2020 and concluded on 29 November 2022.

== Teams ==
A total of 10 teams contest in the league, including six sides from the 2019 season, one relegated from 2019 Meistriliiga and three promoted from the 2019 Esiliiga B.

== League table ==
Pos	Team	Pld	W	D	L	GF	GA	GD	Pts	Promotion, qualification or relegation
1	Vaprus (C, P)	32	19	8	5	72	30	+42	65	Promotion to Meistriliiga
2	Maardu Linnameeskond	32	20	4	8	68	45	+23	64	Qualification for promotion play-offs
3	Nõmme United	32	16	7	9	76	43	+33	55	
4	Flora U21 (Note: Reserve teams are ineligible for promotion.)	32	15	6	11	64	46	+18	51	
5	Elva	32	14	7	11	54	52	+2	49	
6	Tammeka U21	32	12	3	17	47	68	−21	39 (Note: FC Levadia U21 and Pärnu Jalgpalliklubi are part of the relegation group and are placed below Tammeka U21 which is part of the promotion group.)	
7	FCI Levadia U21	30	12	5	13	42	41	+1	41	
8	Pärnu Jalgpalliklubi (O)	30	11	7	12	61	56	+5	40	Qualification for relegation play-offs
9	Vändra (R)	30	10	2	18	47	72	−25	32	Relegation to Esiliiga B
10	Järve (Note: Järve deducted 3 points for financial issues.) (R)	30	1	3	26	13	91	−78	3	Relegation to Esiliiga B

Updated to match(es) played on 25 November 2020. Source: Estonian Football Association (in Estonian),
Rules for classification: 1) Points; 2) Less matches awarded against; 3) Head-to-head points; 4) Head-to-head goal difference; 5) Matches won; 6) Goal difference; 7) Goals scored; 8) Away goals scored; 9) Fairplay ranking.
(C) Champions; (O) Play-off winners; (P) Promoted; (R) Relegated

== Results ==
=== Matches 1–18 ===
Home \ Away	ELV	LEV	FLO	JÄR	MAA	NÕM	PÄR	TAM	VÄN	VAP
Elva	—	4–0	0–1	2–1	0–2	2–4	4–2	2–1	3–2	2–2
FCI Levadia U21	1–1	—	1–1	1–0	2–1	1–4	3–1	2–3	3–1	2–1
Flora U21	5–1	2–1	—	0–0	5–0	2–3	0–0	2–0	1–2	0–1
Järve	0–1	0–2	2–1	—	0–4	1–1	1–2	0–1	2–3	0–5
Maardu LM	1–1	1–0	1–0	2–0	—	3–0	5–1	5–0	3–1	2–1
Nõmme United	0–0	1–0	2–1	0–0	5–0	—	4–0	3–1	1–1	2–2
Pärnu Jalgpalliklubi	3–2	2–0	1–1	2–0	0–1	1–3	—	3–2	0–2	1–1
Tammeka U21	5–1	2–0	0–2	5–2	1–2	0–4	6–1	—	1–0	1–2
Vändra	2–3	3–2	1–3	3–1	1–2	3–3	3–2	2–0	—	2–3
Vaprus	2–1	0–0	2–2	7–0	3–2	1–0	1–1	3–0	4–1	—

Source: Estonian Football Association (in Estonian)
Legend: Blue = home team win; Yellow = draw; Red = away team win.

=== Matches 19–32 ===
Home \ Away	ELV	LEV	FLO	JÄR	MAA	NÕM	PÄR	TAM	VÄN	VAP
Elva	—	2–0	1–1	—	1–2	4–1	—	0–1	2–0	0–0
FCI Levadia U21	—	—	—	—	—	1–0	1–1	—	2–0	0–2
Flora U21	3–5	2–3	—	—	0–4	3–1	—	4–1	4–1	0–1
Järve	2–3	0–6	0–1	—	—	1–8	—	0–1	—	—
Maardu LM	0–0	3–1	3–5	5–0	—	0–2	4–1	2–2	3–1	2–1
Nõmme United	1–0	—	3–4	—	6–0	—	1–1	1–2	—	0–3
Pärnu Jalgpalliklubi	0–3	—	2–3	11–0	—	—	—	—	4–2	1–1
Tammeka U21	1–3	1–1	3–2	—	3–3	0–5	1–5	—	—	2–1
Vändra	—	—	—	1–0	—	1–6	—	1–0	—	—
Vaprus	6–0	—	0–3	1–0	1–0	4–1	—	4–0	6–2	—

Source: Estonian Football Association (in Estonian)
Legend: Blue = home team win; Yellow = draw; Red = away team win.

== Relegation play-offs ==
29 November 2020
13:00 (UTC+2)

Tabasalu	1–3	Pärnu Jalgpalliklubi
Linde 45+1'	Report	Kauniste 34'; Sild 37'; Mohhov 60'

Tabasalu Arena, Tabasalu
Attendance: 293
Referee: Elar Tarkus
5 December 2020
13:00 (UTC+2)

Pärnu Jalgpalliklubi	5–1	Tabasalu
Sild 16'; Makovei 32'; Novikov 37'; Pärnat 53', 75'	Report	Ekharts 29'

Pärnu artificial turf, Pärnu
Attendance: 95
Referee: Kristo Külljastinen

Pärnu Jalgpalliklubi won 8–2 on aggregate.

== Season statistics ==
=== Top scorers ===
Rank	Player	Club	Goals
1	(Estonia) Kevin Mätas	Nõmme United	22
2	(Estonia) Ilja Zelentsov	Maardu Linnameeskond	20
3	(Estonia) Igor Ustritski	Flora U21	19
4	(Estonia) Devid Lehter	Elva	17
5	(Estonia) Ronaldo Tiismaa	Vaprus	14
6	(Estonia) Kristen Saarts	Vaprus	13
7	(Estonia) Vadim Aksjonov	Maardu Linnameeskond	12
7	(Estonia) Martin Jõgi	Tammeka U21	12
7	(Estonia) Kein Makovei	Pärnu Jalgpalliklubi	12
7	(Estonia) Martin Pärn	Vändra	12

== Awards ==
=== Monthly awards ===
Month	Manager of the Month		Player of the Month	
Month	Manager	Club	Player	Club
May	(Estonia) Martin Klasen	Nõmme United	(Estonia) Raimond Eino	Nõmme United
June	(Lithuania) Algimantas Briaunys	Maardu Linnameeskond	(Estonia) Kevin Mätas	Nõmme United
July	(Estonia) Martin Klasen	Nõmme United	(Estonia) Henri Hanson	Vaprus
August	(Estonia) Marti Pähn	Tammeka U21	(Estonia) Devid Lehter	Elva
September	(Estonia) Taavi Midenbritt	Vaprus	(Estonia) Kevin Mätas	Nõmme United
October	(Estonia) Robert Sadovski	FCI Levadia U21	(Estonia) Uku Kõrre	Vaprus

=== Esiliiga Player of the Year ===
Kevin Mätas was named Esiliiga Player of the Year.

== See also ==
- 2019–20 Estonian Cup
- 2020–21 Estonian Cup
- 2020 Meistriliiga
- 2020 Esiliiga B
