= Viimsi JK =

Estonian football club

Viimsi
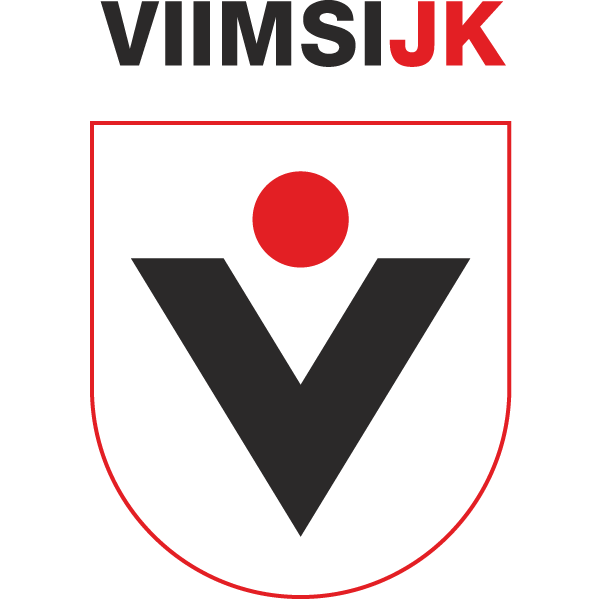
- Full name: Viimsi Jalgpalliklubi
- Founded: 2016; 10 years ago
- Ground: Viimsi Stadium
- Capacity: 1,006
- Chairman: Martin Reim
- Manager: Andres Oper; Arli Salm
- League: Esiliiga
- 2026: Esiliiga, 2nd of 10
- Website: http://mrjk.ee/
Home colours	Away colours

Viimsi Jalgpalliklubi, commonly known as Viimsi JK or simply Viimsi, is an Estonian football club based in Viimsi Parish that competes in Esiliiga, the second-highest division in the Estonian football. The club's home ground is Viimsi Stadium.

== History ==
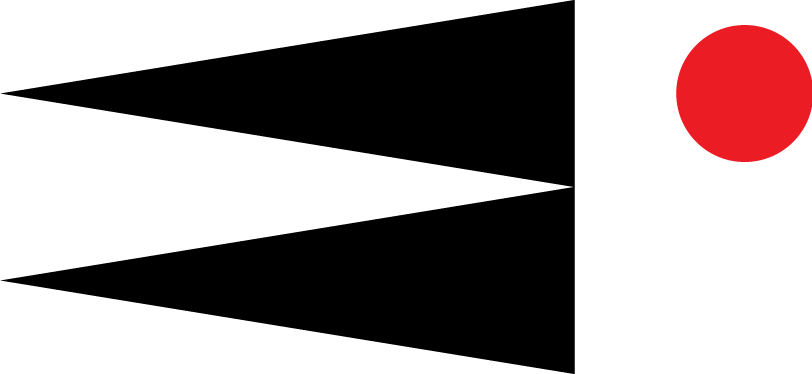
HÜJK Emmaste logo

Viimsi JK was founded in 2016, when HÜJK Emmaste, a club founded in 2000 that represented the Hiiumaa island, and Viimsi MRJK, a club which focused on youth football and was founded in 2007 by Martin Reim, merged. The new club inherited Emmaste's league spot and most senior players, while youth players, management and the stadium were provided by MRJK.

In 2021, Viimsi JK finished first in Esiliiga B and gained promotion to Esiliiga, the second-highest division in Estonian football. After finishing in second place in the 2023 season, the club faced Tartu Tammeka in the top flight promotion play-offs, but lost 1–6 on aggregate. Viimsi reached the 2023–24 Estonian Cup semi-finals, where they lost to the eventual winners FCI Levadia 0–1 after extra time. Viimsi finished the 2024 league season again in second place and faced Tallinna Kalev in the promotion play-offs, narrowly losing 1–2 on aggregate after extra time. For the third consecutive season, Viimsi finished the season as runners-up, this time losing the promotion play-offs to Kuressaare.

== Stadium ==
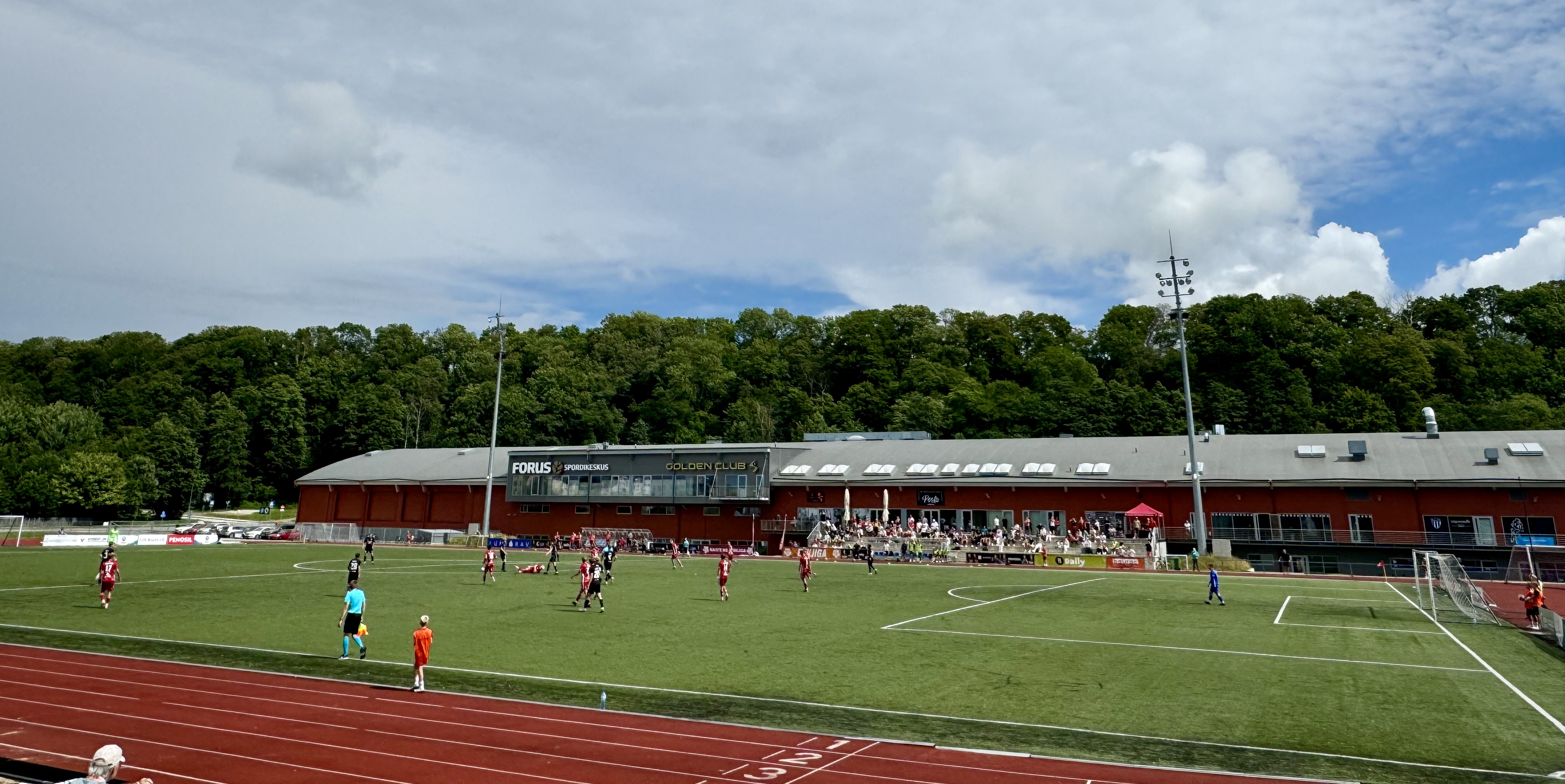
Viimsi Stadium hosting the home match of Viimsi JK

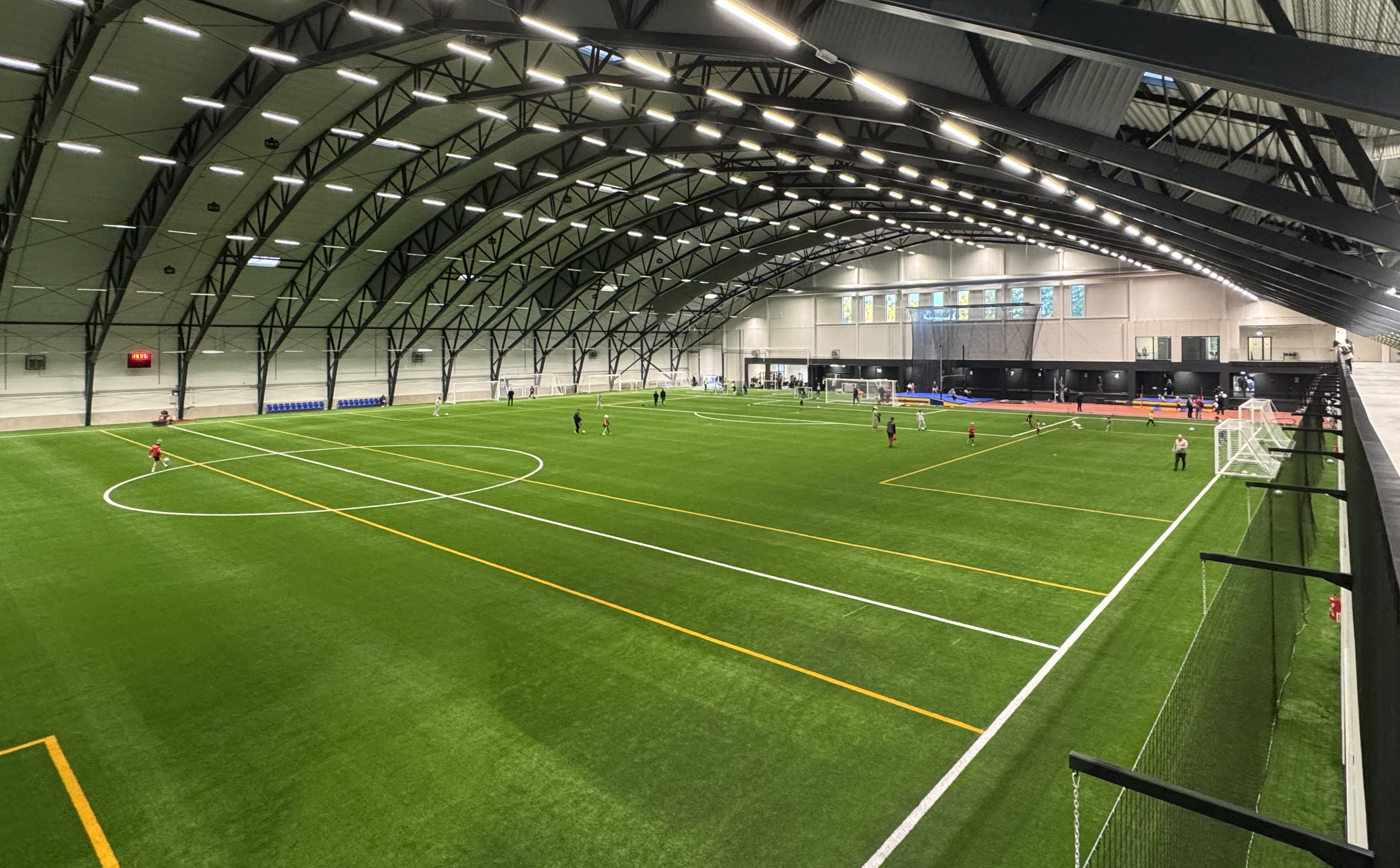
Viimsi indoor football facility

The club's home ground is the 1,006-capacity Viimsi Stadium. Opened in 2015, the multi-purpose stadium has an artificial turf surface and is located in the Haabneeme borough of Viimsi Parish.

The club uses the Viimsi indoor football and athletics hall (Viimsi jalgpalli- ja kergejõustikuhall) as their training centre during the snowy winter period. The facility was opened in 2025 and cost €6.4 million.

== Players ==
=== Current squad ===
As of 24 July, 2026.

Note: Flags indicate national team as defined under FIFA eligibility rules; some limited exceptions apply. Players may hold more than one non-FIFA nationality.

No.	Pos.	Nation	Player
2	DF	EST	Paul Strus
3	DF	EST	Martin Jälle
5	DF	EST	Oscar Ollik
6	MF	EST	Rasmus Lode
7	MF	EST	Johann Kore
8	MF	EST	Karl Kaljuvere
9	MF	EST	Robert Lehtmets
10	MF	EST	Nevil Krimm
12	GK	EST	Christopher Lahe
15	DF	EST	Krister Milk
16	FW	EST	Markus Kaalma
18	FW	CIV	Moses Fofana
20	DF	EST	Robert Laidvee

No.	Pos.	Nation	Player
22	DF	EST	Rasmus Laidvee
23	FW	GHA	Abdul Aziz
27	FW	EST	Karl Mägi
30	MF	EST	Rassel-Rait Rumma
31	GK	EST	Paul Lille
33	DF	EST	Robin Kane
38	MF	EST	Joonas Luts
42	MF	EST	Oskar Mägi
43	MF	KEN	James Murage
71	MF	GHA	Emmanuel Agyemang
77	FW	EST	Roden Vahe
89	MF	EST	Sthen Laur
99	FW	EST	Markus Vaherna

=== Out on loan ===
Note: Flags indicate national team as defined under FIFA eligibility rules; some limited exceptions apply. Players may hold more than one non-FIFA nationality.

No.	Pos.	Nation	Player

== Club officials ==
=== Current technical staff ===
Position	Name
Head coaches	(Estonia) Andres Oper
Head coaches	(Estonia) Arli Salm
Goalkeeping coach	(Estonia) Martin Kaalma
Fitness coach	(Estonia) Raul Jerva
Video analyst	(Estonia) Karl Erich Kaljuvere
Physiotherapist	(Estonia) Mark Vilenski
Management
Chief Executive Officer	(Estonia) Martin Reim
Scouting coordinator	(Italy) Samuele De Pizzol

=== Managerial history ===
Dates	Name
2015–2016	(Estonia) Urmas Kirs
2017–2025	(Estonia) Ivo Lehtmets
2026–	(Estonia) Andres Oper (Estonia) Arli Salm

== Honours ==
=== League ===
- Esiliiga B
  - Winners (1): 2021

== Statistics ==
=== League and Cup ===
as HÜJK Emmaste
Season	Division	Pos	Pld	W	D	L	GF	GA	GD	Pts	Top Goalscorer	Cup
2001	Esiliiga	6	28	12	4	12	43	50	−7	40		
2002	II Liiga	4	20	8	2	10	26	47	−21	26		
2003	II Liiga	3	28	13	9	6	59	32	+27	48		
2004	II Liiga	7	28	6	4	18	40	115	−75	22		
2005	II Liiga	7	28	7	2	19	27	79	−52	23	(Estonia) Priit Mäeorg (4)	
2006	III Liiga	5	22	10	2	10	53	53	0	32	(Estonia) Indrek Rist (9)	
2007	II Liiga	10	26	8	6	12	42	60	−18	30	(Estonia) Rene Lill (9)	
2008	II Liiga	4	26	12	7	7	47	35	+12	43	(Estonia) Ergo Reinvald (13)	
2009	II Liiga	4	26	12	5	9	41	31	+10	41	(Estonia) Rene Lill (11)	
2010	II Liiga	2	26	17	1	8	61	31	+30	52	(Estonia) Reimo Oja (Estonia) Ergo Reinvald (14)	
2011	II Liiga	8	26	11	1	14	54	46	+8	34	(Estonia) Janar Tükk (12)	Quarter-finals
2012	II Liiga	1	26	19	3	4	114	34	+80	60	(Estonia) Tõnis Kaukvere (23)	First round
2013	Esiliiga B	5	36	18	7	11	69	45	+24	61	(Estonia) Reimo Oja (15)	Third round
2014	Esiliiga B	3	36	18	5	13	71	81	−10	59	(Estonia) Reimo Oja (19)	Semi-finals
2015	Esiliiga B	7	36	13	7	16	55	64	−11	46	(Estonia) Ergo Reinvald (7)	Second round

as Viimsi JK
Season	Division	Pos	Pld	W	D	L	GF	GA	GD	Pts	Top Goalscorer	Cup
2016	Esiliiga B	8	36	15	6	15	56	64	−8	51	(Estonia) Janar Tükk (9)	Semi-finals
2017	Esiliiga B	7	36	14	6	16	55	63	−8	48	(Estonia) Alari Verev (Estonia) Priidu Ahven (9)	Third round
2018	II liiga	2	26	21	2	3	97	19	+78	65	(Estonia) Tauri Tursk (34)	Third round
2019	Esiliiga B	5	36	16	4	16	75	68	+7	52	(Estonia) Ken-Marten Tammeveski (20)	Third round
2020	Esiliiga B	5	28	12	5	11	60	44	+16	41	(Estonia) Karl Anton Sõerde (16)	Third round
2021	Esiliiga B	1	32	19	7	6	81	30	+51	64	(Estonia) Karl Anton Sõerde (30)	Second round
2022	Esiliiga	4	36	20	3	13	76	40	+36	63	(Estonia) Ken-Marten Tammeveski (13)	Third round
2023	Esiliiga	2	36	21	8	7	67	35	+32	71	(Estonia) Gregor Lehtmets (25)	First round
2024	Esiliiga	2	36	22	9	5	75	42	+33	75	(Estonia) Gregor Lehtmets (31)	Semi-finals
2025	Esiliiga	2	36	24	6	6	83	27	+56	78	(Ivory Coast) Moses Fofana (13)	First round
