= Laagri Stadium =

Multi-purpose stadium in Laagri, Estonia

Coordinates: 59°21′1.55″N 24°36′59.54″E

Laagri kunstmurustaadion
- Laagri kooli staadion / Laagri Arena
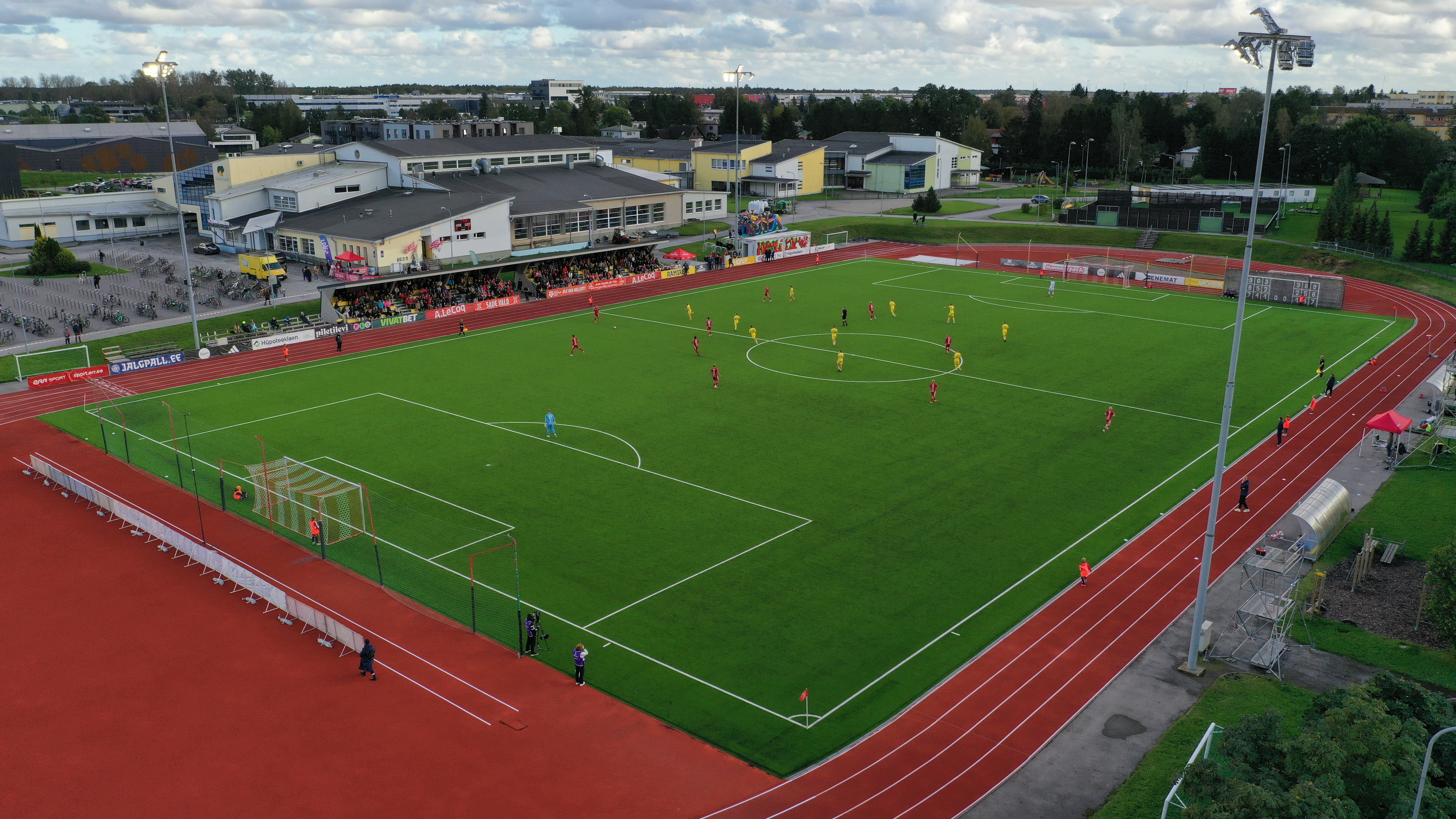
- Address: Veskitammi 22
- Location: Laagri, Saue Parish, Estonia
- Owner: Saue Parish
- Operator: Laagri Haridus- ja Spordikeskus
- Capacity: 500
- Field size: 100 × 64 m
- Surface: Artificial turf

Construction
- Opened: 2005; 20 years ago
- Renovated: 2025

Tenants
- Saue JK (2006–2021, only during winter since 2022); Harju JK (2009–present)

Laagri Stadium (also known as Laagri kunstmurustaadion or as Laagri kooli staadion or as Laagri Arena) is a multi-purpose stadium in Laagri, Saue Parish, Estonia, located just 200 metres from the border of Tallinn. Opened in 2005, it hosts the matches of football clubs Harju JK and Saue JK.

== History ==
The stadium was opened on 14 October 2005 by the then established Laagri school.

The stadium was renovated in the summer of 2025, as new artificial turf surface was installed, the running track was refurbished and a new 500-capacity wooden stand was constructed.

== Gallery ==
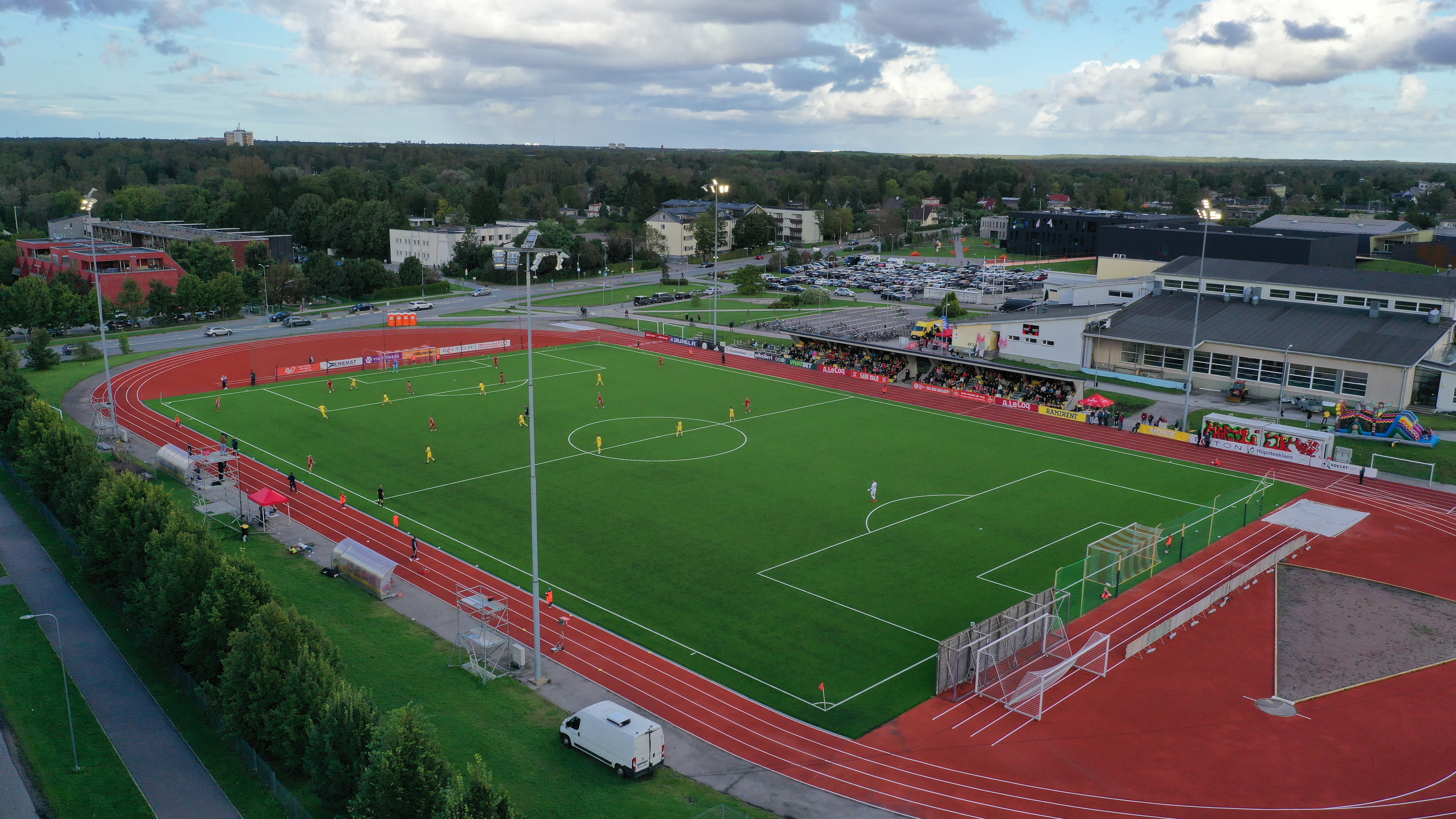

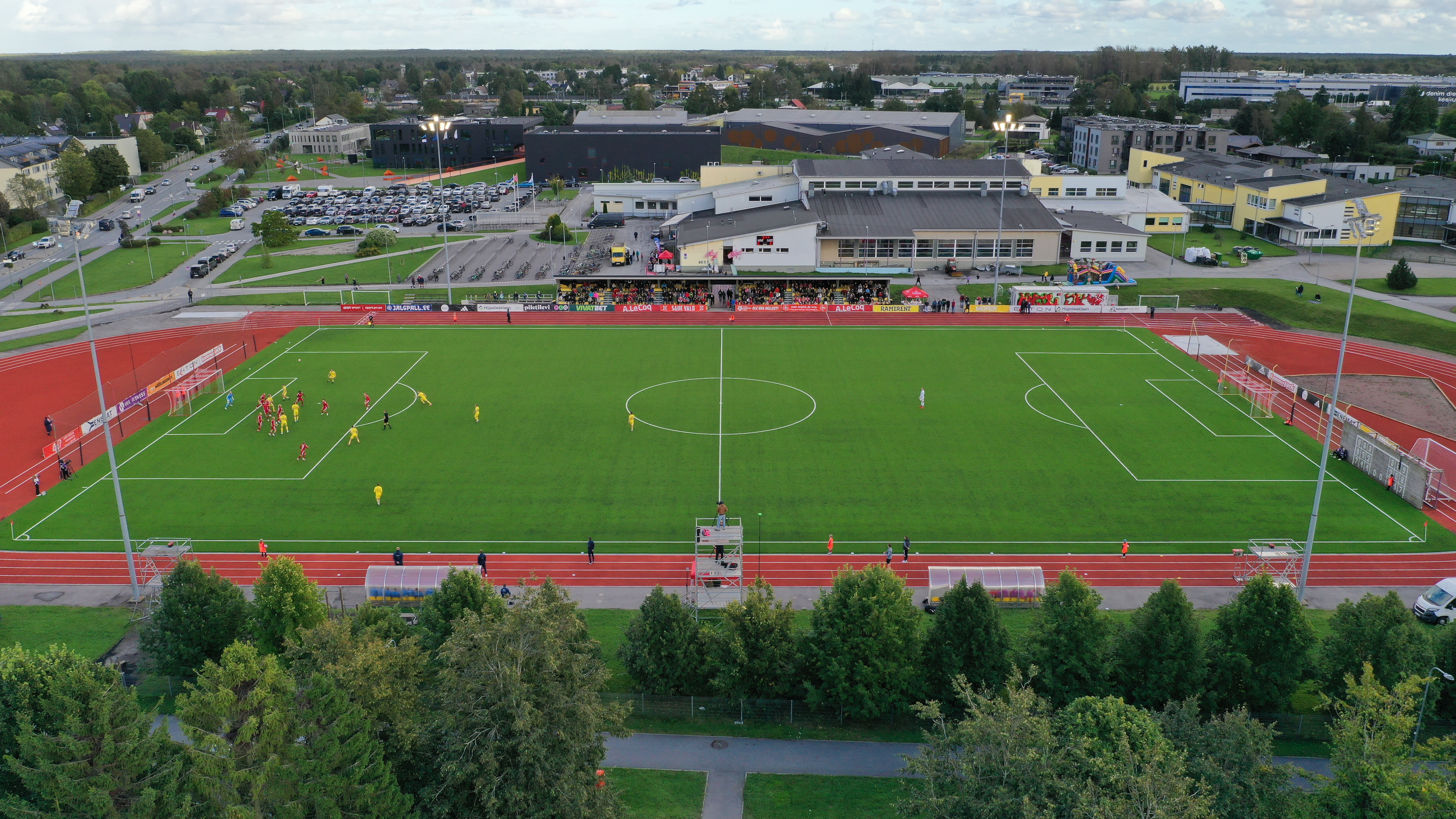

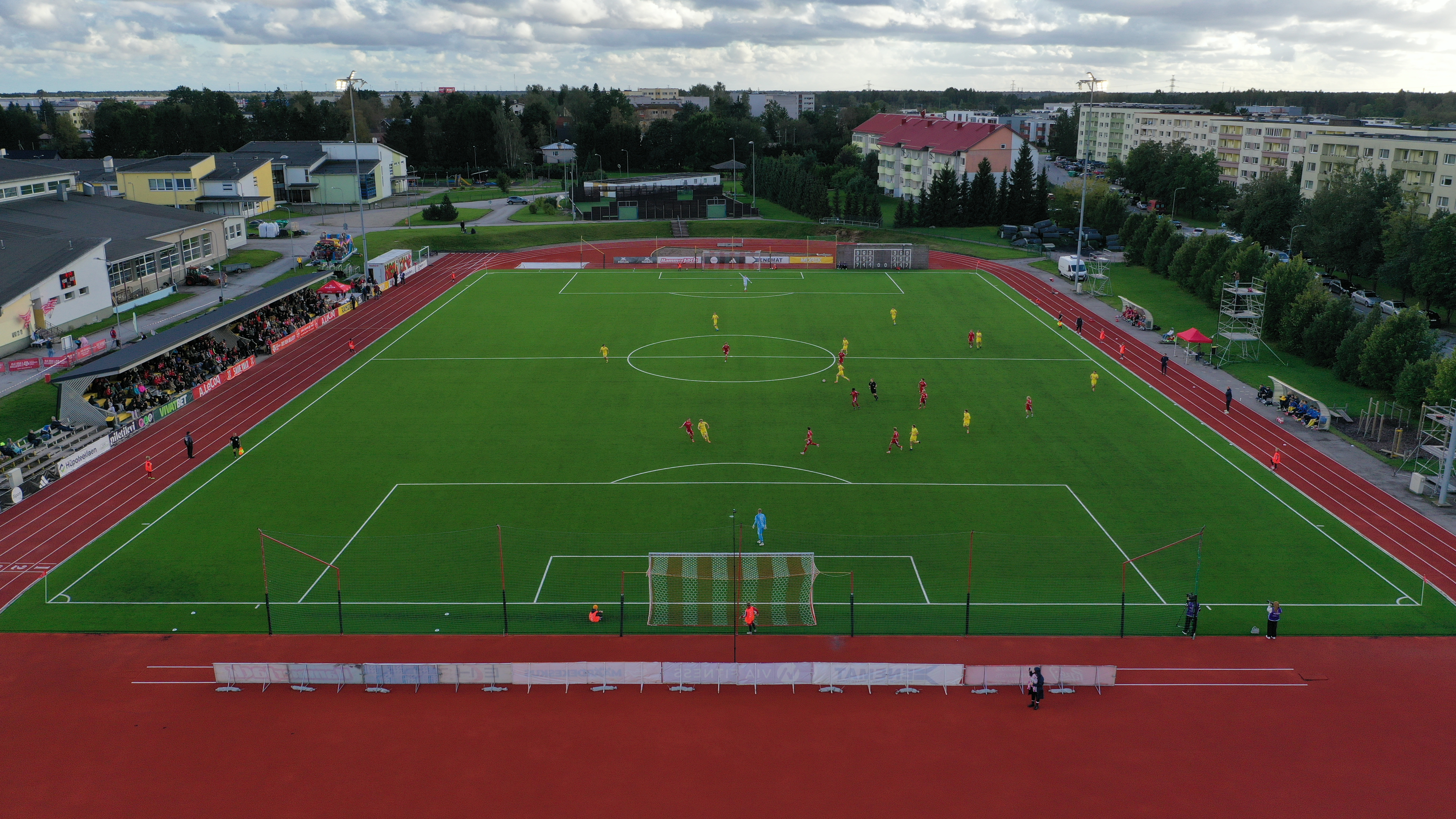
