= Zakaria Beglarishvili =

Georgian footballer (born 1990)

Personal information
- Full name: Zakaria Beglarishvili
- Date of birth: 30 April 1990 (age 36)
- Place of birth: Tbilisi, Georgian SSR, Soviet Union
- Height: 1.71 m (5 ft 7 in)
- Positions: Attacking midfielder; winger

Team information
- Current team: Nõmme United
- Number: 49

Youth career
- 2005–2007: Olimpi Tbilisi
- 2008: Ajax

Senior career*
Years	Team	Apps	(Gls)
2007–2008	Tbilisi	5	(0)
2008–2009	Dila Gori	12	(3)
2009	Locomotive Tbilisi	1	(0)
2010–2012	Flora	73	(34)
2013	Sioni Bolnisi	0	(0)
2014–2020	Flora	167	(60)
2019	→ Budapest Honvéd (loan)	0	(0)
2019	→ SJK Seinäjoki (loan)	5	(0)
2020	KTP	20	(5)
2021–2022	Levadia Tallinn	68	(45)
2023	FK Turon	8	(0)
2023	Gagra	5	(0)
2024	Narva Trans	35	(7)
2025–	Nõmme United	69	(29)

International career
2006	Georgia U17	1	(0)
2007–2008	Georgia U19	5	(0)
2009–2012	Georgia U21	5	(2)
2015	Georgia	1	(0)
- * Club domestic league appearances and goals as of 17 November 2026

Zakaria Beglarishvili (Georgian: ზაქარია ბეგლარიშვილი; born 30 April 1990) is a Georgian professional footballer who plays as an attacking midfielder and winger for Estonian club Nõmme United.

== International career ==
In November 2015, Beglarishvili was called up by Kakhaber Tskhadadze for the Georgia national football team against Estonia and Albania. On 11 November 2015, he made his debut in the match against Estonia, coming on from the bench in the 79th minute.

He expressed his desire to play for the national team of Estonia, country where he has played since 2009. In December 2018, after 8 years of living in Estonia, he passed the Estonian language exam and applied for the citizenship. He received an Estonian passport in September 2019. Eventually FIFA did not allow him to represent Estonia, due to not meeting the requirements.

== Honours ==
Levadia Tallinn

- Meistriliiga:2021
- Estonian Supercup: 2022

Flora

- Meistriliiga: 2010, 2011, 2015, 2017
- Estonian Cup: 2011, 2013
- Estonian Supercup: 2011, 2012, 2014

KTP

- Ykkönen: Runner-Up 2020

=== Individual ===
- Meistriliiga Player of the Month: May 2012, October 2012,May 2021, November 2021, June/July 2022
- Meistriliiga Goal of the Month: June/July 2022, September 2022
- Meistriliiga Player of the Year: 2018
- Meistriliiga Top Assist Provider: 2016, 2017, 2018
- Meistriliiga Top Score: 2022
