= Männiku Stadium =

Football stadium in Tallinn, Estonia

Coordinates: 59°22′56.85″N 24°42′48.65″E

Männiku staadion
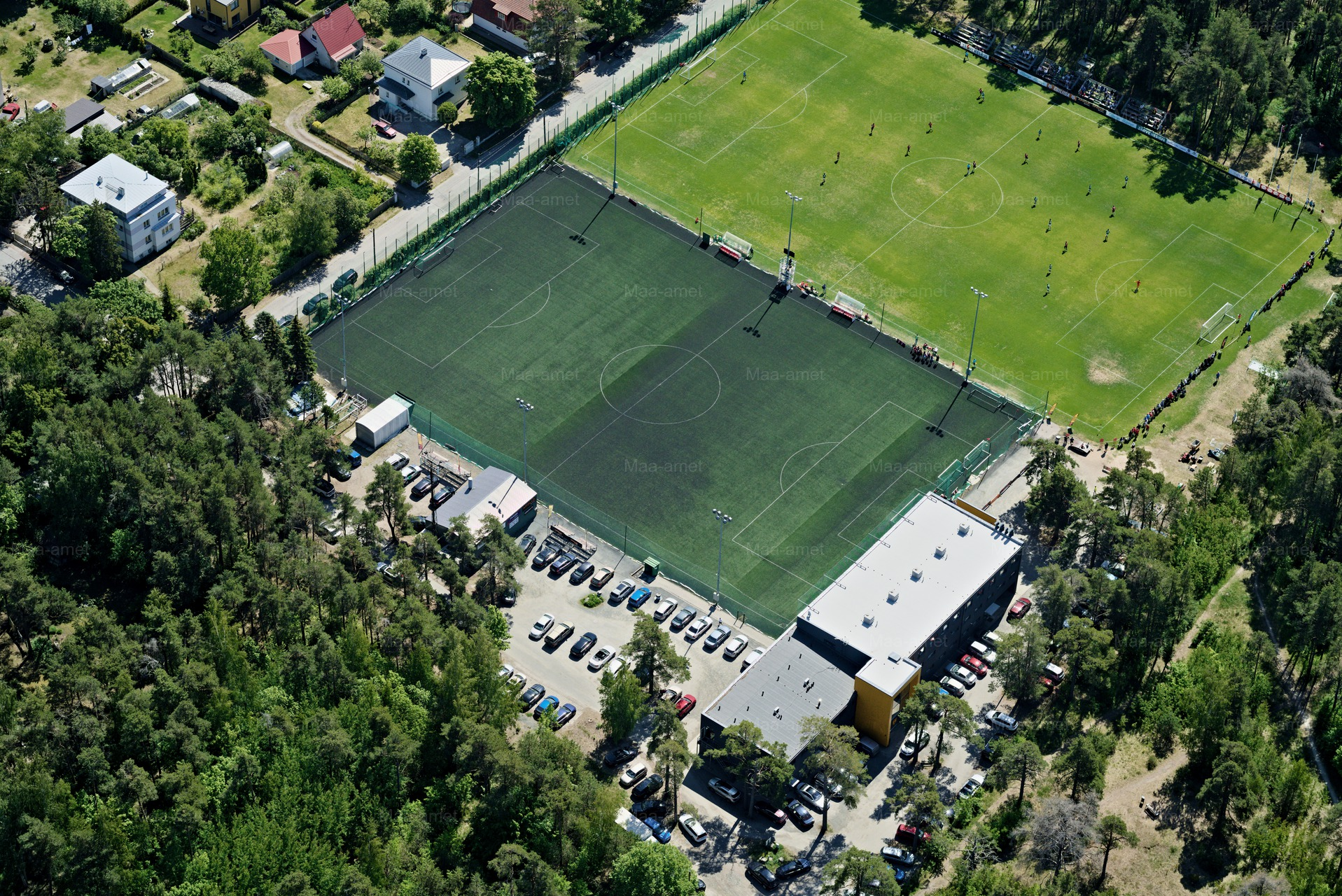
- Männiku Stadium in the upper right corner, next to the football centre's artificial turf ground
- Address: Võidu 16
- Location: Nõmme, Tallinn, Estonia
- Owner: Ivar Vendelin (50%); Mart Poom (50%)
- Operator: FC Nõmme United
- Capacity: 500
- Field size: 102 × 66 m
- Surface: Grass

Construction
- Renovated: 2004, 2006, 2015–2016
- Construction cost: €1.5 million (2016)

Tenants
- FC Nõmme United (2000–present)

Website
- mjkeskus.ee

Männiku Stadium (Estonian: Männiku staadion) is a football stadium in Tallinn, Estonia, and the home of FC Nõmme United. The stadium is located about 6 km south of the city centre, in the district of Nõmme. It is part of the Männiku Football Centre.

== History ==
A sports ground was located at its current location by Võidu street already in the 1930s. In the 1990s, the stadium housed the offices of the Estonian Football Association and also served as a training base for FC Flora.

In 2000, the then owner of the stadium Enn Loog founded Nõmme United and the club started to operate at Männiku Stadium. In 2004, an artificial turf ground with under-soil heating was constructed on one side of the former stadium and in 2006, a natural grass field was built adjacent to that. The stadium's new administrative building cost €1.5 million and was opened in April 2016. That also marked the opening of the Männiku Football Centre.

The stadium underwent slight modifications for Nõmme United’s Premium Liiga debut in 2024, as the seated capacity was increased to 500 and a fan zone was created in the woods behind the stands. In May 2024, Estonian businessman and Nõmme United’s board member Ivar Vendelin purchased 50% of the football complex.

== Männiku Football Centre ==
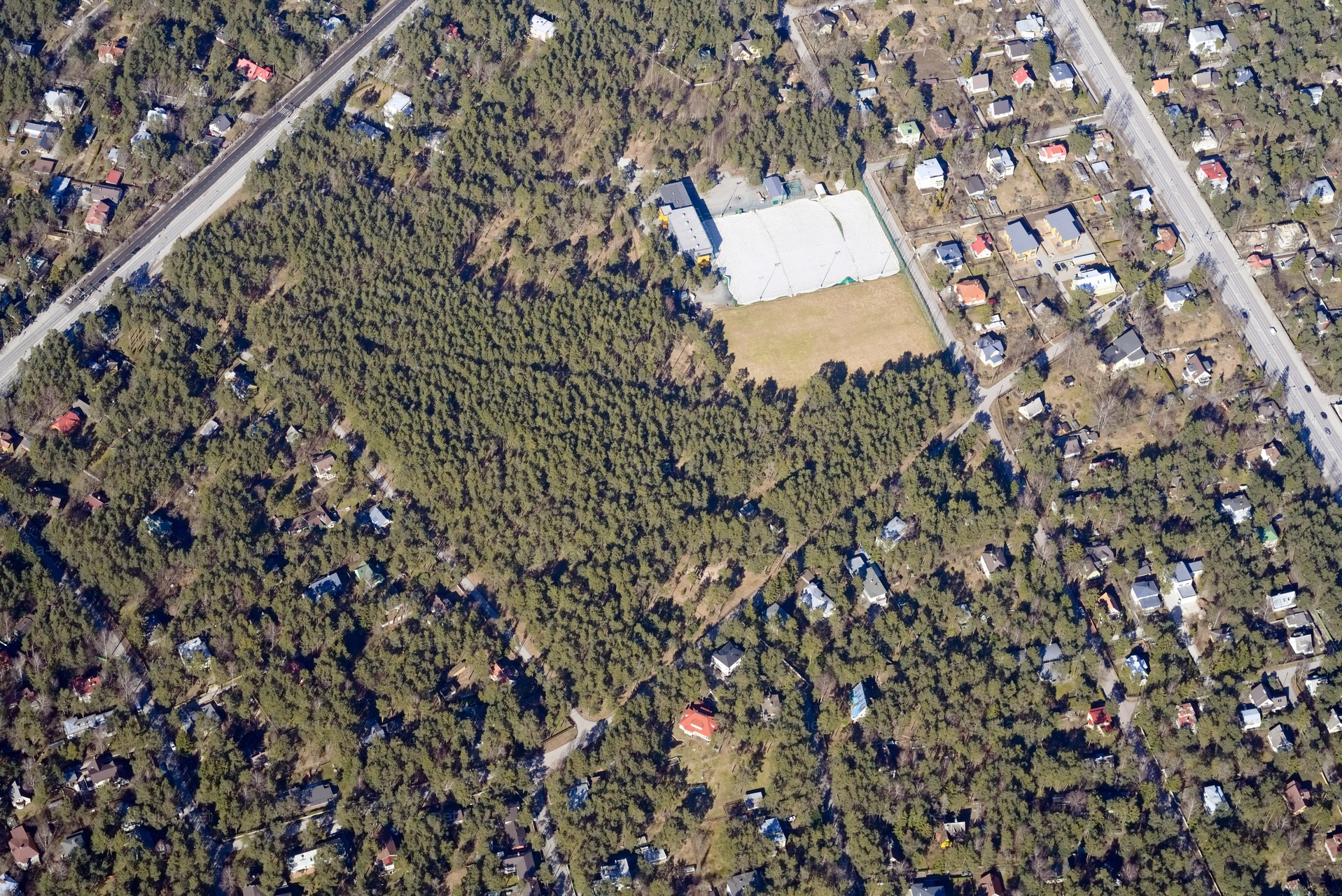
Männiku Football Centre and its surroundings from above

Männiku Stadium is part of the Männiku Football Centre (Estonian: Männiku Jalgpallikeskus). In addition to the natural grass ground, the complex also has an artificial turf football pitch (90 × 60m), upon which an air dome is installed during the winter months. The stadium's administrative building also facilitates a hostel, conference room, gym, sauna, and a cafeteria.

== See also ==
Männiku Stadium in the 20th century (image)
