= Admirals (company) =

Estonian online brokerage group

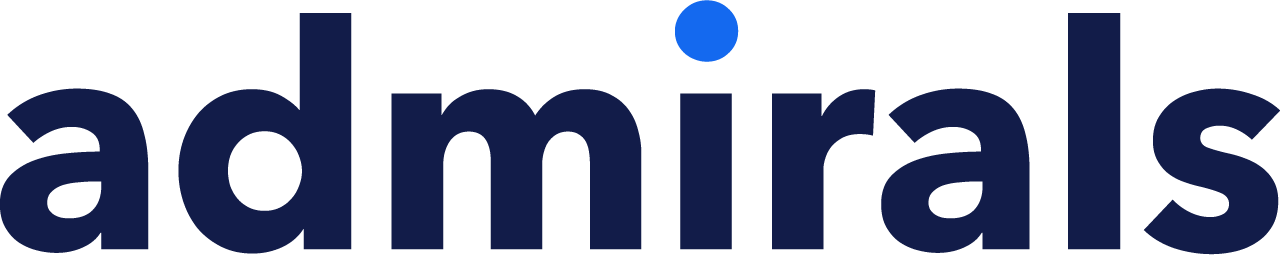
- Type: Private
- Industry: Financial services
- Founded: February 26, 2003; 23 years ago
- Founders: Alexander Tsikhilov
- Headquarters: Tallinn, Estonia
- Area served: worldwide
- Key people: Alexander Tsikhilov (CEO and founder)
- Services: Electronic trading platform Forex & CFD Brokerage Services
- Number of employees: 400+ (2024)
- Website: admiralmarkets.com

Admirals (formerly known as Admiral Markets) is an Estonian online brokerage group based in Tallinn, Estonia, providing access to foreign-exchange trading and contracts for difference (CFDs). Established in 2003 by Alexander Tsikhilov, the company operates through several licensed entities.

== History ==
Admirals was established on 26 February 2003 in Tallinn, Estonia, by a former engineer of Russian origin who had previously owned Admiral Telecom, an internet service provider in Russia. In the early 2000s, Tsikhilov relocated his business to Europe. In 2003, he registered Admiral Markets as a securities and commodity contracts brokerage. The company secured a licence from the Estonian Financial Supervisory Authority, Finantsinspektsioon, in 2009.

In 2017, Admiral Markets raised €1.8 mln through a public bond offering with a maximum size of €5 mln. The bonds were listed on Nasdaq Tallinn's Baltic Bond List in January 2018. In 2019, the company received recognition as the Best Forex Company in Estonia from the Global Banking & Finance Awards and formed partnerships with Trading Central, Acuity and Dow Jones & Company to provide an analytics portal for its clients.

According to Estonian Postimees, in H1 2021 Admiral Markets AS generated net trading income of €9.1 mln, a sharp drop from €31.6 mln in the same period of 2020. A €19.1 mln profit in H1 2020 turned into a €1.6 mln loss. The company received an award at the 2021 ADVFN International Financial Awards.

In March 2021, Admiral Markets rebranded as Admirals and updated its logo. That same year, it became one of the first major retail brokers to end zero-fee trading policies, introducing commissions on stock CFDs and ETF CFDs, while also banning penny stocks.

As of 2022, the company operated in 18 countries and served clients in over 145 countries. Admirals maintained core offices in Estonia, Jordan, Cyprus, Malaysia and the United Kingdom. However, due to the war in Ukraine and subsequent European sanctions, Admirals reduced its workforce in its Minsk office from about 150 to 30 employees, despite previously using this office as a key development center.

In 2023, Admirals saw a sharp financial downturn after its record results of 2022. Full-year 2023 net trading income fell by 41% to €40.9 mln. (from €69 mln. in 2022), and the group reported a loss of €9.9 mln, compared with a €23.6 mln profit in 2022. This decline came despite a rise in active clients (up 62% year-on-year to nearly 90,000 in 2023). Following these results, company founder Alexander Tsikhilov returned as CEO, replacing longtime chief executive Sergei Bogatenkov. At the end of 2023, Admirals was declared Estonia's most competitive financial service company in the country's annual Best Estonian Companies competition.

In early 2024, Admirals said it was considering changes to its licensing structure, including the future of its Estonian investment firm licence, citing the availability of its Cypriot licence and a desire to avoid regulatory duplication. In April 2024, following three consecutive semi-annual periods of declining revenue, Admirals suspended the onboarding of new European clients, citing regulatory challenges with CySEC. After implementing the required technical and organizational changes, Admirals resumed onboarding new clients in the EU by March 2025.

In H1 2024, the company reported a net loss of €1.2 million, despite a 9% reduction in operating expenses and a slight revenue increase to €22 million compared to H1 2023.

In December 2024, Admirals agreed to sell its Australian subsidiary. The sale was completed in mid-2025, and the subsidiary was later rebranded by PU Prime.

In late 2025 and early 2026, Admirals scaled back parts of its international licensing structure. The UAE licence was cancelled in November 2025. By March 2026, onboarding under Jordan and Kenya entities was stopped and redirected to Seychelles. Admiral Markets AS also initiated the process of relinquishing its Estonian investment firm licence.

In April 2026, Finantsinspektsioon revoked Admiral Markets AS's investment firm licence at the company's request, effective 28 April, while Estonian clients were offered continued service through Cyprus-based Admirals Europe Ltd. The company said that Tallinn would remain the group's headquarters, with approximately 60 employees supporting its global operations.

Also in April 2026, Admirals Group published audited 2025 results showing net trading income of €17.4 mln (down 55% YoY) and a net loss of €18.5 mln. Client trade volumes fell 47%, the number of trades declined 34%, and active clients decreased 32%, while the group's cost-to-income ratio rose to 201%. Separately, Admiral Markets UK Ltd reported turnover of £6.39 mln for 2025, broadly unchanged from £6.37 mln in 2024. Administrative expenses increased by 34% to £8.45 mln from £6.30 mln, and the company recorded an operating loss of £2.06 mln, compared with an operating profit of £66,050 a year earlier. Its pre-tax loss widened to £2.02 mln from £1,408, while its net loss increased to £2.03 mln from £45,372.

In June 2026, Finance Magnates reported that INFINOX was in advanced talks to acquire a partial or full ownership stake in Admirals.

In August 2026, Admirals Group's €2.7 mln subordinated bond issue was redeemed early and removed from the Baltic Bond List.

== Management ==
In 2017, Admirals underwent a management restructuring, with Jens Chrzanowski, Victor Gherbovet, and Mindaugas Deksnys joining the board, along with existing board members Sergei Bogatenkov and James Chernikov. In 2018, Stephen Ayme replaced Simon Roberts as general manager.

By September 2022, the board had been reduced to two members, Sergei Bogatenkov and Andrey Koks, following several executive departures including Jens Chrzanowski. Following a 51% revenue decline in early 2023, the company's founder Alexander Tsikhilov returned as CEO. As of March 2024, the Management Board consisted of Tsikhilov, Andrey Koks (CTO/CIO), and Anton Tikhomirov.

In October 2025, Admirals announced a further leadership reshuffle. Longtime executives Anton Tikhomirov and Fedor Ragin were appointed to the Supervisory Board (Board of Directors), with Tikhomirov simultaneously resigning from the Management Board to take on that role. Liudmila Bataeva was added as a member of the Management Board, joining Tsikhilov, Eduard Kelvet, and Andrey Koks. The shake-up followed the company's €5.9 mln. loss in H1 2025 and came after the 2024 departures of CEO Sergei Bogatenkov and the head of the Cyprus office, Andreas Ioannou. As of 1 February 2026, the Management Board consisted of Tsikhilov, Kelvet and Bataeva.

== Controversies ==
Since 2017, the UK's Financial Conduct Authority (FCA) has reported at least five cases of clone firms and websites pretending to be Admiral Markets (Admirals). In May 2025, CySEC warned about a fraudulent website impersonating Admirals.

In March 2020, media outlets reported that Admiral Markets was leaving the Polish market, although the company denied this, stating that its Polish branch was simply undergoing an "affiliation switch." Despite these assurances, the Polish branch closed in March 2021.

In February 2021, Admiral Markets was fined €32,000 by the Estonian regulator Finantsinspektsioon for alleged non-compliance with its investment service obligations. During the crude oil price collapse in April 2020, Finantsinspektsioon said that the company had unilaterally changed terms and increased fees for overnight holdings on certain instruments without prior client notification. The company contested the fine in court, and in 2021, the Harju County Court annulled the decision; this ruling was later upheld by the Tallinn Circuit Court.

In February 2022, Admirals (Admiral Markets AS) was fined €20,000 by Finantsinspektsioon for errors in mandatory transaction reporting. Also in 2022, Tsikhilov publicly criticized the Estonian government's decision to bar IT workers from Russia and Belarus (following Russia's invasion of Ukraine), claiming it undermined Estonia's competitiveness by creating labor shortages and driving up costs in the tech sector.
