= Viimsi Stadium =

Multi-purpose stadium in Viimsi, Estonia

Coordinates: 59°30′35.0″N 24°50′05.4″E

Viimsi staadion
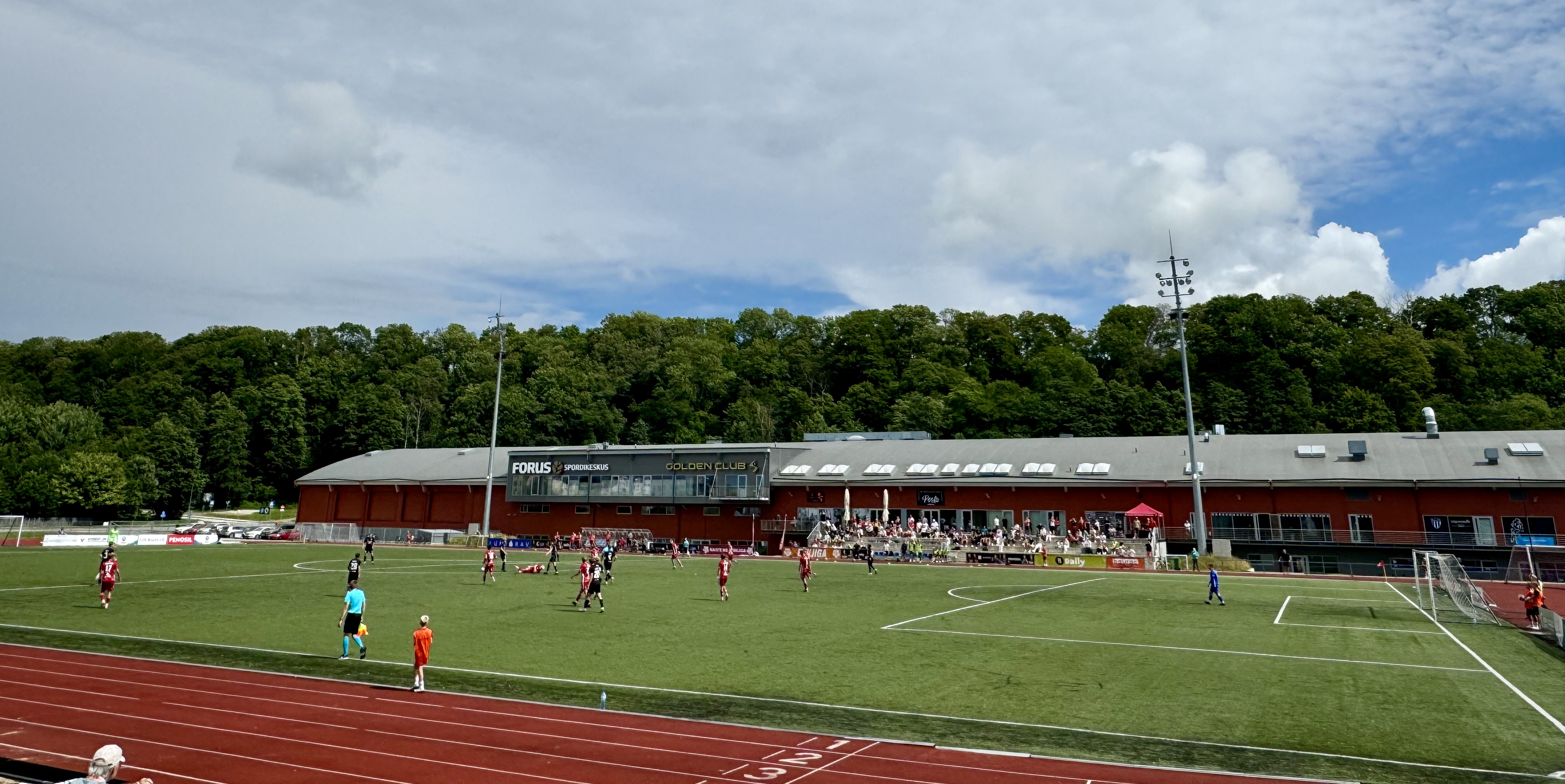
- Location: Haabneeme, Viimsi, Estonia
- Owner: Viimsi Haldus
- Capacity: 1,006
- Field size: 105 × 67 m
- Surface: Artificial turf

Construction
- Opened: 5 November 2015; 9 years ago
- Construction cost: €1.3 million
- Builder: Lemminkäinen Group

Tenants
- Viimsi JK (2016–present)

Viimsi Stadium (Estonian: Viimsi staadion) is a multi-purpose stadium in Haabneeme, Viimsi Parish, Estonia. Opened in 2015, it is the home ground of Viimsi JK. The stadium has a capacity of 1,006.

== History ==
The new Viimsi Stadium began construction in May 2015, after the closing of the former stadium had left Viimsi in need of a new sports ground. The opening event took place on 5 November 2015. In 2018, Karulaugu Sports Centre was opened adjacent to the stadium.
