= 2016 in Estonian football =

Football in Estonia
- Season: 2016

Men's football
- Meistriliiga: FC Infonet
- Esiliiga: JK Tulevik Viljandi
- Esiliiga B: FC Kuressaare
- II Liiga: Paide Linnameeskond U21
- III Liiga: Raplamaa JK
- IV Liiga: Raasiku FC Joker II
- Estonian Cup: FC Flora Tallinn
- Small Cup: Tartu FC Merkuur
- Supercup: FC Infonet

This page summarizes 2016 in Estonian football.

== National teams ==
The home team or the team that is designated as the home team is listed in the left column; the away team is in the right column.

Win Draw Loss

== Senior ==
=== Friendly matches ===
6 January 2016	Sweden	1–1	Estonia	Abu Dhabi, U.A.E.
21:00 UTC+04	Ishak 70'	(Report)	Prosa 56'	Stadium: Armed Forces Stadium; Attendance: 100; Referee: Ahmed Salem Khalfan Binshaqui Alaleeli (U.A.E)

24 March 2016	Estonia	0–0	Norway	Tallinn, Estonia
19:00 UTC+03		(Report)		Stadium: A. Le Coq Arena; Attendance: 2,892; Referee: Andrew Dallas (Scotland)

29 March 2016	Estonia	0–1	Serbia	Tallinn, Estonia
19:00 UTC+03		(Report)	Kolarov 81'	Stadium: A. Le Coq Arena; Attendance: 2,858; Referee: Arnold Hunter (Ireland)

1 June 2016	Estonia	2–0	Andorra	Tallinn, Estonia
19:00 UTC+03	Kruglov 24'; Liivak 90'	Report		Stadium: A. Le Coq Arena; Attendance: 4,658; Referee: Sergejus Slyva

8 June 2016	Portugal	7–0	Estonia	Lisbon, Portugal
19:00 UTC+01	C. Ronaldo 36', 45'; Quaresma 39', 77'; Danilo Pereira 55'; Mets 61' (o.g.); Eder 80'	Report		Stadium: Estadio da Luz; Attendance: 52,536

31 August 2016	Estonia	1–1	Malta	Pärnu, Estonia
19:00 UTC+03	Zenjov 57'	Report	Effiong 59'	Stadium: Pärnu Rannastaadion; Attendance: 2,515; Referee: Michael Tykgaard

19 November 2016	Saint Kitts and Nevis	1–1	Estonia	Basseterre, St. Kitts and Nevis
02:00 UTC+03	Elliot 9'	Report	Sappinen 41'	Stadium: Warner Park; Referee: Leon Clarke

22 November 2016	Antigua and Barbuda	0–1	Estonia	Saint John's, Antigua and Barbuda
01:00 UTC+03		Report	Marin 27'	Stadium: Antigua Recreation Grounds; Referee: Tristley Bassue

=== Baltic Cup 2016 ===
29 May 2016	Lithuania	2–0	Estonia	Klaipėda, Lithuania
16:00 UTC+03	Valskis 30'; Fedor Cernych 45'	Report		Stadium: Klaipėda Stadium; Attendance: 3,700; Referee: Aleksandrs Anufrijevs

4 June 2016	Estonia	0–0	Latvia	Tallinn, Estonia
19:00 UTC+03		Report		Stadium: A. Le Coq Arena; Attendance: 1,982; Referee: Gediminas Mazeika

=== FIFA World Cup 2018 qualifying ===
6 September 2016 Group H	Bosnia and Herzegovina	5–0	Estonia	Zenica, Bosnia and Herzegovina
20:45 UTC+02	Spahic 7', 90'; Džeko 23' (pen.); Medunjanin 71'; Ibišević 83'	Report		Stadium: Bilino Polje Stadium; Referee: Miroslav Zelinka

7 October 2016 Group H	Estonia	4–0	Gibraltar	Tallinn, Estonia
21:45 UTC+03	Käit 47', 70'; Vassiljev 52'; Mošnikov 88'	Report		Stadium: A. Le Coq Arena; Attendance: 4,678; Referee: Aleksei Eskov

10 October 2016 Group H	Estonia	0–2	Greece	Tallinn, Estonia
21:45 UTC+03		Report	Torosidis 2'; Stafylidis 61'	Stadium: A. Le Coq Arena; Attendance: 4,467; Referee: István Vad

13 November 2016 Group H	Belgium	8–1	Estonia	Brussels, Belgium
20:45 UTC+02	Meunier 8'; Mertens 16', 68'; Hazard 25'; Carrasco 62'; Lukaku 83', 88'	Report	Anier 29'	Stadium: King Baudouin Stadium; Attendance: 37, 128; Referee: Alexandru Tudor

== Promotion and relegation ==
=== Pre-season ===
League	Promoted to league	Relegated from league
Meistriliiga	Rakvere Tarvas	Viljandi Tulevik
Esiliiga	Maardu LM; Kohtla-Järve JK Järve	Kiviõli Irbis ^{1}; Kuressaare
Esiliiga B	Welco; Tammeka II; Viljandi Tulevik II	Puuma^{2}; Ararat
II Liiga	Merkuur; Narva United; Santos II; Pärnu JK; Forza	Tallinna C.F.^{2}; FCF Tallinna Ülikool^{2}; Tondi^{2}; Pärnu Metropool^{2}
III Liiga	Infonet III; Harju JK; Väätsa Vald; Kohtla-Järve II; Hell Hunt; Eston Villa; Piraaja II; Igiliikur; FC Tarvastu; Suure-Jaani United; FC Nõmme United II; Raplamaa JK; Pärnu JK Vaprus; Pärnu JK Poseidon; FC Zenit Tallinn; Lasnamäe FC Ajax II	JK Narva Trans II^{2}; FC Kiviõli Irbis II^{2}; Dnipro^{2}; Rapla JK Atli^{2}; SK Eestimaa Kasakad^{2}; Tallinna FC Soccernet; FCF Tallinna Ülikool II^{2}; Keila JK II^{2}; Vändra JK Vaprus II^{2}; Saaremaa JK aameraaS^{2}; Saaremaa Malev^{2}
IV Liiga	FC Helios Tartu; Viljandi JK Tulevik III; Tallinna FC Castovanni Eagles II; Raasiku FC Joker II; Türi JK Ganvix II; Tallinna FC Transferwise; Tallinna FC Eston Villa II; Rumori Calcio Tallinn; FC Haapsalu Harrastajad	Raasiku Valla FC^{2}; Tallinna FC Saksa Premium^{2}; Tartu FC Bronx Wood^{2}; Tartu JK Taara^{2}; Tabivere RSK^{2}; Läänemaa JK Haapsalu II^{2}; FC Haiba^{3}

1. Club was relegated to II Liiga
2. Club was dissolved
3. Club emerged with JK Kernu Kadakas

== League tables ==
=== Meistriliiga ===
Pos	Team	Pld	W	D	L	GF	GA	GD	Pts	Qualification or relegation
1	Infonet Tallinn (C)	36	24	8	4	74	33	+41	80	Qualification for the Champions League first qualifying round
2	Levadia Tallinn	36	24	6	6	77	30	+47	78	Qualification for the Europa League first qualifying round (Note: Since the winner of the 2016–17 Estonian Cup FCI Tallinn had qualified to Champions League, the cup winners' spot was inherited by fourth-placed club Flora.)
3	Nõmme Kalju	36	22	9	5	70	28	+42	75	Qualification for the Europa League first qualifying round
4	Flora Tallinn	36	21	10	5	96	31	+65	73	Qualification for the Europa League first qualifying round
5	Sillamäe Kalev	36	14	9	13	65	55	+10	51	
6	Paide Linnameeskond	36	14	6	16	58	61	−3	48	
7	Tartu Tammeka	36	12	5	19	43	65	−22	41	
8	Narva Trans	36	11	8	17	60	68	−8	41	
9	Pärnu Linnameeskond (O)	36	5	2	29	24	98	−74	17	Qualification for the relegation play-offs
10	Rakvere Tarvas (R)	36	0	3	33	15	113	−98	3	Relegation to the Esiliiga

Source: Estonian Football Association (in Estonian), UEFA, Soccerway
Rules for classification: 1) Points; 2) Play-off (only if deciding champion); 3) Less matches awarded against; 4) Head-to-head points; 5) Head-to-head goal difference; 6) Matches won; 7) Goal difference; 8) Goals scored; 9) Away goals scored; 10) Fairplay ranking.
(C) Champions; (O) Play-off winners; (R) Relegated

=== Esiliiga ===
Pos	Team	Pld	W	D	L	GF	GA	GD	Pts	Promotion, qualification or relegation
1	Tulevik (C, P)	36	28	5	3	106	38	+68	89	Promotion to Meistriliiga
2	Flora U21 (Note: Reserve teams are ineligible for promotion.)	36	20	8	8	78	47	+31	68	
3	Infonet II	36	18	2	16	98	81	+17	56	
4	Maardu Linnameeskond	36	16	6	14	83	75	+8	54	Qualification for the promotion play-offs
5	Levadia U21	36	15	5	16	81	69	+12	50	
6	Santos	36	16	1	19	63	70	−7	49	
7	Tallinna Kalev	36	13	6	17	56	58	−2	45	
8	Nõmme Kalju U21 (R)	36	12	5	19	62	86	−24	41	Qualification for the relegation play-offs
9	Vaprus (R)	36	8	8	20	48	96	−48	32	Relegation to the Esiliiga B
10	Järve (R)	36	8	6	22	42	97	−55	30	Relegation to the Esiliiga B

Updated to match(es) played on unknown. Source: Esiliiga (in Estonian)
Rules for classification: 1) Points; 2) Play-off (only if deciding champion); 3) Less matches awarded against; 4) Matches won; 5) Head-to-head points; 6) Head-to-head goal difference; 7) Goal difference; 8) Goals scored; 9) Away goals scored; 10) Fairplay ranking.
(C) Champions; (P) Promoted; (R) Relegated

=== Esiliiga B ===
Pos	Team	Pld	W	D	L	GF	GA	GD	Pts	Promotion, qualification or relegation
1	Kuressaare (C, P)	36	23	7	6	117	48	+69	76	Promotion to the Esiliiga
2	Elva (P)	36	21	5	10	67	39	+28	68	Promotion to the Esiliiga
3	Welco (O, P)	36	20	4	12	74	50	+24	64	Qualification for the promotion play-offs
4	Tammeka U21	36	18	5	13	89	64	+25	59	
5	Tallinna Kalev II (Note: Reserve teams are ineligible for promotion.)	36	16	7	13	72	53	+19	55	
6	Sillamäe Kalev II	36	16	5	15	70	61	+9	53	
7	Joker	36	14	10	12	74	66	+8	52	
8	Viimsi (O)	36	15	6	15	56	64	−8	51	Qualification for the relegation play-offs
9	Flora U19 (R)	36	4	7	25	27	85	−58	19	Relegation to II liiga
10	Tulevik II (R)	36	4	2	30	26	142	−116	14	Relegation to II liiga

Updated to match(es) played on unknown. Source: Esiliiga B (in Estonian)
Rules for classification: 1) Points; 2) Play-off (only if deciding champion); 3) Less matches awarded against; 4) Matches won; 5) Head-to-head points; 6) Head-to-head goal difference; 7) Goal difference; 8) Goals scored; 9) Away goals scored; 10) Fairplay ranking.
(C) Champions; (O) Play-off winners; (P) Promoted; (R) Relegated

=== II Liiga ===
==== North/East ====
Pos	Team	Pld	W	D	L	GF	GA	GD	Pts	Promotion, qualification or relegation
1	Merkuur (C, P)	26	18	4	4	99	47	+52	58	Promotion to Esiliiga B
2	Lokomotiv	26	15	7	4	67	33	+34	52	Qualification to Promotion/relegation playoffs
3	Lasnamäe Ajax	26	15	6	5	55	38	+17	51	
4	Narva	26	13	6	7	84	58	+26	45	
5	Tabasalu	26	12	7	7	56	48	+8	43	
6	Levadia III	26	12	5	9	58	51	+7	41	
7	Dünamo	25	11	4	10	48	47	+1	37	
8	TJK Legion	25	11	1	13	54	59	−5	34	
9	Võru	26	9	7	10	46	48	−2	34	
10	Noorus	26	8	7	11	66	65	+1	31	
11	Santos II	26	8	4	14	56	68	−12	28	
12	Piraaja	26	6	6	14	33	61	−28	24	Qualification to Promotion/relegation play-off
13	Rada (R)	26	6	3	17	32	85	−53	21	Relegation to III Liiga
14	Irbis (R)	26	3	1	22	24	69	−45	10	Relegation to III Liiga

Updated to match(es) played on 23 October 2016. Source: soccerway
Rules for classification: 1) points; 2) goal difference; 3) number of goals scored
(C) Champions; (P) Promoted; (R) Relegated

==== South/West ====
Pos	Team	Pld	W	D	L	GF	GA	GD	Pts	Promotion, qualification or relegation
1	Paide II (C, P)	26	21	4	1	92	24	+68	67	Promotion to Esiliiga B
2	Keila (P)	26	20	2	4	93	32	+61	62	Qualification to Promotion/relegation playoffs
3	Nõmme United	26	19	3	4	131	38	+93	60	
4	Pärnu	26	19	0	7	98	49	+49	57	
5	Saue	26	16	4	6	85	47	+38	52	
6	Viimsi II	26	12	5	9	60	49	+11	41	
7	Tõrva	26	12	1	13	60	52	+8	37	
8	FC Kuressaare II	26	9	5	12	55	69	−14	32	
9	Imavere	26	9	3	14	70	77	−7	30	
10	Ganvix	26	8	5	13	47	59	−12	29	
11	Forza	26	7	2	17	50	93	−43	23	
12	Ararat (R)	26	5	3	18	41	101	−60	18	Qualification to Promotion/relegation play-off
13	Kose (R)	26	4	0	22	20	89	−69	12	Relegation to III Liiga
14	Rummu Dünamo (R)	26	2	1	23	27	154	−127	7	Relegation to III Liiga

Updated to match(es) played on 23 October 2016. Source: soccerway
Rules for classification: 1) points; 2) goal difference; 3) number of goals scored
(C) Champions; (P) Promoted; (R) Relegated

=== III Liiga ===
==== North ====
Pos	Team	Pld	W	D	L	GF	GA	GD	Pts	Promotion, qualification or relegation
1	Reliikvia (C, P)	22	17	1	4	65	26	+39	52	Promotion to II Liiga
2	Hell Hunt	22	15	3	4	56	35	+21	48	Qualification to Promotion/relegation play-offs
3	Retro	22	13	4	5	66	44	+22	43	
4	Kalev III	22	13	3	6	63	30	+33	42	
5	Castovanni	22	12	4	6	45	31	+14	40	
6	Eston Villa	22	9	4	9	61	52	+9	31	
7	Kalju III	22	8	4	10	39	43	−4	28	
8	Štrommi	22	7	4	11	55	68	−13	25	
9	Igiliikur	22	6	2	14	21	55	−34	20	
10	Saku	22	6	1	15	29	54	−25	19	Qualification to Promotion/relegation play-offs
11	Piraaja II (R)	22	4	4	14	30	62	−32	16	Relegation to IV Liiga
12	Olympic (R)	22	3	4	15	23	53	−30	13	Relegation to IV Liiga

Updated to match(es) played on 9 October 2016. Source:
Rules for classification: 1) points; 2) goal difference; 3) number of goals scored
(C) Champions; (P) Promoted; (R) Relegated

==== East ====
Pos	Team	Pld	W	D	L	GF	GA	GD	Pts	Promotion, qualification or relegation
1	Maardu United (C, P)	22	18	0	4	85	34	+51	54	Promotion to II Liiga
2	Infonet III	22	15	4	3	65	27	+38	49	Qualification to Promotion/relegation play-offs
3	Järve II	22	13	1	8	54	40	+14	40	
4	Ambla Vallameeskond	22	12	2	8	59	53	+6	38	
5	Väätsa	22	12	0	10	45	57	−12	36	
6	Maardu LM II	22	12	0	10	62	57	+5	36	
7	Harju JK Laagri	22	10	3	9	71	58	+13	33	
8	Järva-Jaani	22	9	1	12	56	56	0	28	
9	JK Loo	22	8	1	13	39	69	−30	25	
10	Koeru	22	7	1	14	33	65	−32	22	Qualification to Promotion/relegation play-offs
11	Tarvas II (R)	22	6	0	16	29	62	−33	18	Relegation to IV Liiga
12	Kaitseliit Kalev (R)	22	3	1	18	16	36	−20	10	Relegation to IV Liiga

Updated to match(es) played on 9 October 2016. Source: soccerway
Rules for classification: 1) points; 2) goal difference; 3) number of goals scored
(C) Champions; (P) Promoted; (R) Relegated

==== South ====
Pos	Team	Pld	W	D	L	GF	GA	GD	Pts	Promotion, qualification or relegation
1	FC Otepää (C, P)	22	16	2	4	84	45	+39	50	Promotion to II Liiga
2	Tarvastu	22	14	5	3	77	35	+42	47	Qualification to Promotion/relegation play-offs
3	EMÜ	22	14	1	7	76	53	+23	43	
4	FC Vastseliina	22	13	4	5	74	40	+34	43	
5	Tartu	22	13	3	6	54	35	+19	42	
6	Welco II	22	10	7	5	42	31	+11	37	
7	Tääksi	22	9	2	11	49	58	−9	29	
8	Suure-Jaani	22	8	3	11	46	49	−3	27	
9	Fauna	22	8	0	14	51	60	−9	24	
10	Põlva (R)	22	5	1	16	16	68	−52	16	Qualification to Promotion/relegation play-offs
11	Navi (R)	22	5	1	16	46	62	−16	16	Relegation to IV Liiga
12	Valga (R)	22	2	1	19	27	107	−80	7	Relegation to IV Liiga

Updated to match(es) played on 9 October 2016. Source: soccerway
Rules for classification: 1) points; 2) goal difference; 3) number of goals scored
(C) Champions; (P) Promoted; (R) Relegated

==== West ====
Pos	Team	Pld	W	D	L	GF	GA	GD	Pts	Promotion, qualification or relegation
1	Raplamaa JK (C, P)	22	19	0	3	77	20	+57	57	Promotion to II Liiga
2	Pärnu Vaprus (P)	22	19	0	3	69	22	+47	57	Qualification to Promotion/relegation play-offs
3	Nõmme United II	22	16	1	5	113	49	+64	49	
4	Läänemaa JK	22	15	2	5	81	16	+65	47	
5	Zenit Tallinn	22	11	2	9	76	57	+19	35	
6	Poseidon	22	10	2	10	47	49	−2	32	
7	Lihula JK	22	7	5	10	46	48	−2	26	
8	Pakri	22	8	2	12	48	46	+2	26	
9	Kernu	22	6	2	14	30	65	−35	20	
10	Kärdla (R)	22	5	3	14	37	62	−25	18	Qualification to Promotion/relegation play-offs
11	Ajax Lasnamäe II (R)	22	3	3	16	17	103	−86	12	Relegation to IV Liiga
12	Lelle (R)	22	1	2	19	12	116	−104	5	Relegation to IV Liiga

Updated to match(es) played on 9 October 2016. Source: soccerway
Rules for classification: 1) points; 2) goal difference; 3) number of goals scored
(C) Champions; (P) Promoted; (R) Relegated

=== IV Liiga ===
==== North/East ====
Pos	Team	Pld	W	D	L	GF	GA	GD	Pts	Promotion, qualification or relegation
1	Joker II (C, P)	18	15	0	3	75	25	+50	45	Promotion to III Liiga
2	Kristiine (P)	18	12	1	5	48	34	+14	37	Promotion to III Liiga
3	Depoo (P)	18	11	2	5	47	39	+8	35	Promotion to III Liiga
4	Soccernet	18	10	0	8	51	35	+16	30	Qualification to Promotion/relegation play-offs
5	Castovanni II	18	9	2	7	47	43	+4	29	Qualification to Promotion/relegation play-offs
6	Ganvix II	18	9	1	8	39	39	0	28	
7	Twister	18	5	3	10	42	65	−23	18	
8	TransferWise	18	5	3	10	43	54	−11	18	
9	Reaal	18	3	4	11	30	50	−20	13	
10	Tallinna Jalgpalliselts	18	2	2	14	27	63	−36	8	

Updated to match(es) played on 9 October 2016. Source: soccerway
Rules for classification: 1) points; 2) goal difference; 3) number of goals scored
(C) Champions; (P) Promoted

==== North/West ====
Pos	Team	Pld	W	D	L	GF	GA	GD	Pts	Promotion, qualification or relegation
1	Trummi (C, P)	18	16	1	1	82	30	+52	49	Promotion to III Liiga
2	Märjamaa (P)	18	11	3	4	35	22	+13	36	Promotion to III Liiga
3	Rumori Calcio (P)	18	10	3	5	49	24	+25	33	Promotion to III Liiga
4	Toompea (P)	18	8	4	6	38	33	+5	28	Qualification to Promotion/relegation play-offs
5	Tallinna JK Augur	18	7	3	8	38	39	−1	24	
6	Tabasalu II	18	6	6	6	54	43	+11	24	
7	Haapsalu	18	6	2	10	36	48	−12	20	
8	Jalgpallihaigla	18	5	2	11	28	68	−40	17	
9	Eston Villa II	18	5	2	11	32	55	−23	17	
10	Majandusmagister	18	2	2	14	16	46	−30	8	

Updated to match(es) played on 9 October 2016. Source: soccerway
Rules for classification: 1) points; 2) goal difference; 3) number of goals scored
(C) Champions; (P) Promoted

==== South ====
Pos	Team	Pld	W	D	L	GF	GA	GD	Pts	Promotion, qualification or relegation
1	Tammeka U19 (C, P)	18	15	0	3	86	19	+67	45	Promotion to III Liiga
2	FC Jõgeva Wolves (P)	18	11	2	5	69	50	+19	35	Promotion to III Liiga
3	Tulevik III (P)	18	11	1	6	43	29	+14	34	Qualification to Promotion/relegation play-offs
4	Võru FC Helios	18	9	1	8	41	43	−2	28	
5	Elva II	18	8	2	8	32	36	−4	26	
6	Helios Tartu	18	4	2	12	21	61	−40	14	
7	Roosu	18	0	2	16	11	65	−54	2	

Updated to match(es) played on 9 October 2016. Source: soccerway
Rules for classification: 1) points; 2) goal difference; 3) number of goals scored
(C) Champions; (P) Promoted

=== Estonian Cup ===
Fourth round
Tallinna FC Flora	17
JK Retro	0
FC Nõmme United	2
Tartu FC Santos	3
Pärnu Linnameeskond	1
Tartu JK Tammeka	2
Navi Vutiselts	0
Tõrva JK	7
JK Sillamäe Kalev	1
Tallinna FC Levadia	0
Viljandi JK Tulevik	0
Nõmme Kalju FC	5
Viimsi JK	4
Vastseliina FC Tannem	0
Tallinna FC Forza	6
JK Väätsa Vald	2

Quarterfinals
FC Flora Tallinn	3
Tartu FC Santos	1
Tartu JK Tammeka	2
Tõrva JK	0
JK Sillamäe Kalev	1
Nõmme Kalju FC	0
Viimsi JK	6
FC Forza Tallinn	1

Semifinals
Flora	2
Tartu JK Tammeka	0
Sillamäe Kalev	2
Viimsi JK	0

Final
FC Flora Tallinn (a.e.t.)	3
JK Sillamäe Kalev	0

Home teams listed on top of bracket. (AET): At Extra Time

== Promotion/relegation playoffs ==
=== To Meistriliiga ===
==== First leg ====
Meistriliiga 9th vs Esiliiga 2nd	Pärnu Linnameeskond	4:3	Maardu Linnameeskond

==== Second leg ====
Esiliiga 2nd vs Meistriliiga 9th	Maardu Linnameeskond	1:5	Pärnu Linnameeskond

=== To Esiliiga ===
==== First leg ====
Esiliiga 8th vs Esiliiga B 3rd	Tartu JK Welco	+:-	Nõmme Kalju FC II

==== Second leg ====
Esiliiga B 3rd vs Esiliiga 8th	Nõmme Kalju FC II	-:+	Tartu JK Welco

=== To Esiliiga B ===
==== First leg ====
II E/N Liiga 2nd vs II W/S Liiga 2nd	Jõhvi FC Lokomotiv	0:1	Keila JK

==== Second leg ====
II W/S Liiga 2nd vs II E/N Liiga 2nd	Keila JK	8:0	Jõhvi FC Lokomotiv

==== First leg ====
II Liiga 2nd vs Esiliiga B 8th	Keila JK	2:1	Viimsi JK

==== Second leg ====
Esiliiga B 8th vs II Liiga 2nd	Viimsi JK	1:0	Keila JK

=== To II Liiga ===
==== First leg ====
III N Liiga 2nd vs III E Liiga 2nd	Tallinna FC Hell Hunt	2:-	FC Infonet III Tallinn

==== Second leg ====
III E Liiga 2nd vs III N Liiga 2nd	FC Infonet III Tallinn	-:0	Tallinna FC Hell Hunt

==== First leg ====
III S Liiga 2nd vs III W Liiga 2nd	FC Tarvastu	-:+	Pärnu JK Vaprus

==== Second leg ====
III W Liiga 2nd vs III S Liiga 2nd	Pärnu JK Vaprus	+:-	FC Tarvastu

==== First leg ====
III N&E Liiga Playoff Winner vs II N/E Liiga 12th	Tallinna FC Hell Hunt	0:2	JK Piraaja Tallinn

==== Second leg ====
II N/E Liiga 12th vs III N&E Liiga Playoff Winner	JK Piraaja Tallinn	5:1	Tallinna FC Hell Hunt

==== First leg ====
III S&W Liiga Playoff Winner vs II S/W Liiga 12th	Pärnu JK Vaprus	8:1	FC Ararat Tallinn

==== Second leg ====
II S/W Liiga 12th vs III S&W Liiga Playoff Winner	FC Ararat Tallinn	1:5	Pärnu JK Vaprus

=== To III Liiga ===
==== First leg ====
IV S Liiga 3rd vs III S Liiga 10th	Viljandi JK Tulevik III	2:0	Põlva FC Lootos

==== Second leg ====
III S Liiga 10th vs IV S Liiga 3rd	Põlva FC Lootos	1:0	Viljandi JK Tulevik III

==== First leg ====
IV Liiga 4th vs III E Liiga 10th	Tallinna FC Castovanni Eagles II	-:3	Koeru JK

==== Second leg ====
III E Liiga 10th vs IV Liiga 4th	Koeru JK	0:-	Tallinna FC Castovanni Eagles II

==== First leg ====
IV Liiga 4th vs III W Liiga 10th	FC Toompea	4:1	Kärdla Linnameeskond

==== Second leg ====
III W Liiga 10th vs IV Liiga 4th	Kärdla Linnameeskond	4:2	FC Toompea

==== First leg ====
III N Liiga 10th vs IV Liiga 5th	Saku Sporting	+:-	Tallinna FC Soccernet

==== Second leg ====
IV Liiga 5th vs III N Liiga 10th	Tallinna FC Soccernet	-:+	Saku Sporting

== Estonian clubs in international competitions ==
Club	Competition	Final round
Flora	2016–17 UEFA Champions League	First qualifying round
Infonet	2016–17 UEFA Europa League	First qualifying round
Kalju	2016–17 UEFA Europa League	Third qualifying round
Levadia	2016–17 UEFA Europa League	Second qualifying round

=== FC Flora Tallinn ===
28 June 2016 Champions League First qualifying round	Flora (Estonia)	2–1	(Gibraltar) Lincoln Red Imps	Tallinn, Estonia
18:00 UTC+02	Alliku 35'; Sappinen 49'	(Report)	J. Chipolina 57'	Stadium: A. le Coq Arena; Attendance: 886; Referee: Rob Harvey (Ireland)

6 July 2016 Champions League First qualifying round	Lincoln Red Imps (Gibraltar)	2–0	(Estonia) Flora	Gibraltar
19:00 UTC+02	J. Chipolina 57' (pen.); Calderón 79'	(Report)		Stadium: Victoria Stadium; Attendance: 1, 020; Referee: Alain Durieux (Luxembourg)

=== FC Infonet ===
30 June 2016 Europa League First qualifying round	Heart of Midlothian (Scotland)	2–1	(Estonia) Infonet Tallinn	Edinburgh, Scotland
21:00	Buaben 28' (pen.); Kalimullin 36' (o.g.)	(Report)	Harin 21'	Stadium: Tynecastle Stadium; Attendance: 14, 417; Referee: Vilhjálmur Alvar Þórarinsson (Iceland)

6 July 2016 Europa League First qualifying round	Infonet Tallinn (Estonia)	2–4	(Scotland) Heart of Midlothian	Tallinn, Estonia
19:00	Harin 51'; Voskoboinikov 63'	(Report)	Paterson 2'; Rossi 9', 52'; Öztürk 45+1'	Stadium: A. Le Coq Arena; Attendance: 1, 354; Referee: Petr Ardeleanu (Czech Republic)

=== JK Nõmme Kalju ===
30 June 2016 Europa League First qualifying round	Trakai (Lithuania)	2–1	(Estonia) Nõmme Kalju	Vilnius, Lithuania
18:00	Valskis 69'; Arshakyan 78'	(Report)	Wakui 6' (pen.)	Stadium: LFF Stadium; Attendance: 500; Referee: Vladimir Vnuk (Slovakia)

7 July 2016 Europa League First qualifying round	Kalju (Estonia)	4–1	(Lithuania) Trakai	Tallinn, Estonia
18:00	Rodrigues 66'; Sidorenkov 69'; Neemelo 87', 90+2'	(Report)	Arshakyan 14'	Stadium: Kadriorg Stadium; Attendance: 465; Referee: Erik Lambrechts (Belgium)

14 July 2016 Europa League Second qualifying round	Maccabi Haifa (Israel)	1–1	(Estonia) Nõmme Kalju	Netanya, Israel
19:00	Vermouth 70'	(Report)	Toomet 47'	Stadium: Netanya Stadium; Attendance: 6, 500; Referee: Svein-Erik Edvartsen (Norway)

21 July 2016 Europa League Second qualifying round	Nõmme Kalju (Estonia)	1–1 (5–3 p)	(Israel) Maccabi Haifa	Tallinn, Estonia
18:00	Neemelo 90'	(Report)	Rukavytsya 34' (pen.)	Stadium: Kadriorg Stadium; Attendance: 6, 500; Referee: Markus Hameter (Austria)
	Penalties
	Uggè (penalty scored); Sidorenkov (penalty scored); Purje (penalty scored); Wakui (penalty scored); Subbotin (penalty scored)		(penalty scored) Obraniak; (penalty scored) Rukavytsya; (penalty missed) Zenati; (penalty scored) Menachem

28 July 2016 Europa League Third qualifying round	Osmanlıspor (Turkey)	1–0	(Estonia) Nõmme Kalju	Ankara, Turkey
20:00	Tiago Pinto 74'	(Report)		Stadium: Osmanlı Stadyumu; Referee: Nikola Dabanović (Montenegro)

4 August 2016 Europa League Third qualifying round	Nõmme Kalju (Estonia)	0–2	(Turkey) Osmanlıspor	Tallinn, Estonia
18:00		(Report)	Numan Cürüksu 4'; Delarge 29'	Stadium: Kadriorg Stadium; Referee: Christian Tingert (Germany)

=== FC Levadia Tallinn ===
30 June 2016 Europa League First qualifying round	Levadia Tallinn (Estonia)	1–1	(Faroe Islands) HB	Tallinn, Estonia
18:00	Marin 65'	(Report)	Jespersen 21'	Stadium: Kadriorg Stadium; Attendance: 730; Referee: Filip Glova (Slovakia)

7 July 2016 Europa League First qualifying round	HB (Faroe Islands)	0–2	(Estonia) Levadia Tallinn	Tórshavn, Faroe Islands
17:00		(Report)	Kobzar 71'; Miranchuk 90+2'	Stadium: Gundadalur; Attendance: 580; Referee: Radek Příhoda (Czech Republic)

14 July 2016 Europa League Second qualifying round	Levadia Tallinn (Estonia)	3–1	(Czech Republic) Slavia Prague	Tallinn, Estonia
18:00	Hunt 35'; Gando 67'; Antonov 90'	(Report)	Mingazow 63'	Stadium: Kadriorg Stadium; Attendance: 2, 750; Referee: Neil Doyle (Republic of Ireland)

21 July 2016 Europa League Second qualifying round	Slavia Prague (Czech Republic)	2–0	(Estonia) Levadia Tallinn	Prague, Czech Republic
19:00	Škoda 10'; Van Kessel 67'	(Report)		Stadium: Eden Arena; Referee: Christos Nicolaides (Cyprus)
