= 2017 in Estonian football =

Football in Estonia
- Season: 2017

Men's football
- Meistriliiga: FC Flora
- Esiliiga: Maardu Linnameeskond
- Esiliiga B: Nõmme Kalju FC U21
- II Liiga: Tallinna JK Legion
- III Liiga: Paide Linnameeskond III
- IV Liiga: Haapsalu JK
- Estonian Cup: FCI Tallinn
- Small Cup: Paide Linnameeskond III
- Supercup: FCI Tallinn

This page summarizes 2017 in Estonian football.

== National teams ==
The home team or the team that is designated as the home team is listed in the left column; the away team is in the right column.

Win Draw Loss

=== Senior ===
==== Friendly matches ====
28 March 2017	Estonia	3–0	Croatia	Tallinn, Estonia
19:00 UTC+03	Luts 1'; Vassiljev 81'; Zenjov 84'	(Report)		Stadium: A. le Coq Arena; Attendance: 4,987; Referee: Mark Clattenburg

12 June 2017	Latvia	1–2	Estonia	Riga, Latvia
19:45 UTC+03	Ikaunieks 22'	(Report)	Zenjov 52'; Purje 77'	Stadium: Skonto Stadium; Attendance: 3,157; Referee: Kirill Levnikov

9 November 2017	Finland	3–0	Estonia	Helsinki, Finland
19:00 UTC+03	Soiri 27'; Lod 32' 54'	(Report)		Stadium: Telia 5G -areena Attendance: 2,190; Referee: Ola Hobber Nielsen

12 November 2017	Malta	0–3	Estonia	Ta' Qali, Malta
16:00 UTC+03		(Report)	Sappinen 1'; Mošnikov 14'; Anier 89'	Stadium: Ta' Qali; Attendance: 2,796; Referee: Genc Nuza

19 November 2017	Fiji	0–2	Estonia	Suva, Fiji
04:00 UTC+03		(Report)	Anier 14'; Miller 90'	Stadium: ANZ National Stadium; Attendance: 4,500; Referee: Nick Waldron

23 November 2017	Vanuatu	0–1	Estonia	Port Vila, Vanuatu
05:00 UTC+03		(Report)	Liivak 29'	Stadium: Port Vila Municipal Stadium; Attendance: 3,000; Referee: Médéric Lacour

26 November 2017	New Caledonia	1–1	Estonia	Noumea, New Caledonia
08:00 UTC+03	Ounei 64'	(Report)	Anier 53'	Stadium: Stade Numa-Daly Magenta; Referee: Kader Zitouni

==== FIFA World Cup 2018 qualifying ====
25 March 2017 Group H	Cyprus	0–0	Estonia	Nicosia, Cypros
19:00 UTC+03		Report		Stadium: GSP Stadium; Attendance: 3,864; Referee: Ville Nevalainen

9 June 2017 Group H	Estonia	0–2	Belgium	Tallinn, Estonia
21:45 UTC+03		(Report)	Mertens 31'; Chadli 86'	Stadium: A. Le Coq; Attendance: 10,176; Referee: John Beaton

31 August 2017 Group H	Greece	0–0	Estonia	Pireus, Greece
21:45 UTC+03		(Report)		Stadium: Karaiskakis Stadium; Attendance: 12,379; Referee: Liran Liany

3 September 2017 Group H	Estonia	1–0	Cyprus	Tallinn, Estonia
19:00 UTC+03	Käit 90'	(Report)		Stadium: A. Le Coq Arena; Attendance: 6,252; Referee: Adrien Jaccottet

7 October 2017 Group H	Gibraltar	0–6	Estonia	Algarve, Portugal
18:00 UTC+02		(Report)	Luts 10'; Käit 30'; Zenjov 38'; Tamm 52', 65', 77'	Stadium: Estadio Algarve; Attendance: 712; Referee: Fran Jovic

10 October 2017 Group H	Estonia	1–2	Bosnia and Herzegovina	Tallinn, Estonia
21:45 UTC+03	Antonov 75'	(Report)	Hajrovic 48', 84'	Stadium: A. Le Coq Arena; Attendance: 4,967; Referee: Vladislav Bezborodov

== Men's football ==
=== Promotion and relegation ===
League	Promoted to league	Relegated from league
Meistriliiga	Viljandi Tulevik	Rakvere Tarvas
Esiliiga	Kuressaare; Elva; Welco	Järve; Vändra; Kalju U21
Esiliiga B	Paide U21; Keila	Tulevik U21; Flora U19
II Liiga	Maardu United; Maardu Linnameeskond II; Kohtla-Järve JK Järve II; Raplamaa JK; Pärnu JK Vaprus II; FC Otepää	Kuusalu JK Rada; FC Kose; Rummu Dünamo; Jõhvi FC Lokomotiv^{1}; FC Kiviõli Irbis^{1}; Tallinna FC Forza^{1}
III Liiga	Tartu JK Tammeka U19; FC Jõgeva Wolves; Viljandi JK Tulevik III; Tartu FC Helios; Raplamaa JK II; Rumori Calcio Tallinn; Tallinna JK Augur; Raasiku FC Joker II; Kristiine JK	Põlva FC Lootos; Valga FC Warrior; Rakvere JK Tarvas II; Tallinna FC Olympic Olybet; Tallinna JK Piraaja II; Maarjamäe FC Igiliikur; JK Kaitseliit Kalev^{1}; FC Nõmme United II^{1}
IV Liiga	Kohila Püsivus; Jõgeva FC Wolves II; Tõrva JK II; Keila JK II; FCP Pärnu; Võru FC Helios II; Pärnu JK Poseidon II; Kadrina SK Moe; Anija JK; FC Maardu Aliens; Viljandi JK Tulevik IV; Põhja-Tallinna JK Volta II; Tallinna FC Zapoos	Tallinna FC Castovanni Eagles II^{1}; Türi Ganvix JK II^{1}; Tallinna FC Twister^{1}; Trummi SK Kohila^{1}; Tabasalu JK Charma II^{1}; Tallinna FC Eston Villa II^{1}; SK Roosu^{1}

1. Club did not enter the Championship

=== Meistriliiga ===
Pos	Team	Pld	W	D	L	GF	GA	GD	Pts	Qualification or relegation
1	Flora (C)	36	28	6	2	100	28	+72	90	Qualification for the Champions League first qualifying round
2	Levadia	36	25	9	2	106	20	+86	84	Qualification for the Europa League first qualifying round (Note: Narva Trans qualified for the Europa League first qualifying round since the 2017–18 Estonian Cup winners FCI Levadia had already qualified for the competition based on their league position and FCI Tallinn merged with Levadia after the 2018 season.)
3	Nõmme Kalju	36	24	6	6	101	32	+69	78	Qualification for the Europa League first qualifying round
4	FCI Tallinn	36	20	5	11	103	47	+56	65	
5	Narva Trans	36	13	6	17	46	63	−17	45	Qualification for the Europa League first qualifying round
6	Paide Linnameeskond	36	10	8	18	47	88	−41	38	
7	Tammeka	36	9	10	17	40	63	−23	37	
8	Tulevik	36	8	4	24	34	95	−61	28	
9	Vaprus (Note: Relegation play-offs were not held as a league spot was vacated by the merger of FCI Tallinn and Levadia.)	36	2	2	32	29	146	−117	8	Qualification for the Relegation play-offs
10	Sillamäe Kalev (Note: Sillamäe Kalev were stripped of their Meistriliiga license due to financial troubles.) (R)	36	10	6	20	52	76	−24	36	Relegation to the II liiga

Source: Estonian Football Association (in Estonian), UEFA, Soccerway
Rules for classification: 1) Points; 2) Less matches awarded against; 3) Head-to-head points; 4) Head-to-head goal difference; 5) Matches won; 6) Goal difference; 7) Goals scored; 8) Away goals scored; 9) Fairplay ranking.
(C) Champions; (R) Relegated

=== Esiliiga ===
Pos	Team	Pld	W	D	L	GF	GA	GD	Pts	Promotion, qualification or relegation
1	Maardu LM (C)	36	24	5	7	92	44	+48	77	Promotion to the Meistriliiga
2	Tallinna Kalev (P)	36	24	2	10	95	44	+51	74	Qualification for the promotion play-offs
3	Tarvas	36	21	4	11	66	57	+9	67	
4	Flora U21 (Note: Reserve teams are ineligible for promotion.)	36	21	4	11	75	42	+33	67	
5	Kuressaare (P)	36	17	4	15	70	63	+7	55	
6	Levadia U21	36	13	6	17	56	60	−4	45	
7	FCI U21	36	13	4	19	60	85	−25	43	
8	Santos	36	13	4	19	75	74	+1	43	Qualification for the relegation play-offs
9	Elva	36	9	2	25	40	90	−50	29	Relegation to Esiliiga B
10	Welco	36	4	7	25	30	100	−70	19	Relegation to Esiliiga B

Updated to match(es) played on 5 November 2017. Source: soccerway (in English), Esiliiga (in Estonian)
Rules for classification: 1) Points; 2) Play-off (only if deciding champion); 3) Less matches awarded against; 4) Matches won; 5) Head-to-head points; 6) Head-to-head goal difference; 7) Goal difference; 8) Goals scored; 9) Away goals scored; 10) Fairplay ranking.
(C) Champions; (P) Promoted

=== Esiliiga B ===
Pos	Team	Pld	W	D	L	GF	GA	GD	Pts	Promotion, qualification or relegation
1	Kalju U21 (C, P)	36	20	8	8	72	43	+29	68	Promotion to the Esiliiga
2	Kalev U21 (Note: Reserve teams are ineligible for promotion.) (P)	36	19	7	10	71	40	+31	64	Promotion to the Esiliiga
3	Vändra	36	19	5	12	75	67	+8	62	Qualification for the promotion play-offs
4	Keila (P)	36	18	6	12	75	55	+20	60	Got promoted, because other teams didn't want to get promoted.
5	Järve	36	15	6	15	55	48	+7	51	
6	Tammeka U21	36	14	7	15	69	73	−4	49	
7	Viimsi (R)	36	14	6	16	55	63	−8	48	Decided to play in II Liiga the following year.
8	Joker (R)	36	13	7	16	58	72	−14	46	Decided to play in II Liiga the following year.
9	Paide U21	36	9	7	20	50	79	−29	34	Stayed in Esiliiga B, because other teams were relegated.
10	Sillamäe Kalev U21 (R)	36	8	3	25	38	85	−47	27	Dissolved

Updated to match(es) played on 5 November 2017. Source: soccerway (in English), Esiliiga B (in Estonian)
Rules for classification: 1) Points; 2) Play-off (only if deciding champion); 3) Less matches awarded against; 4) Matches won; 5) Head-to-head points; 6) Head-to-head goal difference; 7) Goal difference; 8) Goals scored; 9) Away goals scored; 10) Fairplay ranking.
(C) Champions; (P) Promoted; (R) Relegated

=== II Liiga ===
==== North/East ====
Pos	Team	Pld	W	D	L	GF	GA	GD	Pts	Promotion, qualification or relegation
1	TJK Legion (C, P)	26	19	3	4	119	39	+80	60	Promotion to Esiliiga B.
2	Levadia III	26	17	0	9	93	50	+43	51	Qualification to Promotion/relegation play-offs.
3	Võru (P)	26	15	4	7	55	30	+25	49	Promotion to Esiliiga B, because other teams didn't want to get promoted.
4	Merkuur	26	14	4	8	81	68	+13	46	Club didn't participate in the championship the following year.
5	Lasnamäe Ajax (P)	26	14	3	9	68	47	+21	45	Promotion to Esiliiga B, because other teams didn't want to get promoted.
6	Dünamo	26	13	5	8	57	33	+24	44	
7	Noorus	26	14	2	10	64	53	+11	44	
8	Narva	26	11	4	11	52	74	−22	37	
9	Piraaja	26	9	6	11	43	51	−8	33	
10	Maardu LM II	26	10	1	15	72	72	0	31	
11	Santos II	26	8	3	15	64	80	−16	27	
12	Maardu United	26	7	5	14	38	71	−33	26	Weren't relegated to III liiga, because some teams dissolved.
13	Ararat	26	6	5	15	36	69	−33	23	Weren't relegated to III liiga, because some teams dissolved.
14	Järve II (Note: Reserve teams are ineligible for promotion.)	26	1	3	22	13	98	−85	6	Weren't relegated to III liiga, because some teams dissolved.

Updated to match(es) played on 22 October 2017. Source:
Rules for classification: 1) points; 2) goal difference; 3) number of goals scored
(C) Champions; (P) Promoted

==== South/West ====
Pos	Team	Pld	W	D	L	GF	GA	GD	Pts	Promotion, qualification or relegation
1	Nõmme United (C, P)	26	23	2	1	158	18	+140	71	Promotion to Esiliiga B.
2	Pärnu (O)	26	19	3	4	101	23	+78	60	Qualification to Promotion/relegation play-offs.
3	Tabasalu	26	15	3	8	77	57	+20	48	
4	Tulevik U21	26	13	1	12	55	71	−16	40	
5	Ganvix	26	12	4	10	48	50	−2	40	
6	Saue (R)	26	12	4	10	65	55	+10	40	Relegation to III liiga.
7	Flora U19 (P)	26	9	7	10	43	49	−6	34	Promotion to Esiliiga B, because other teams didn't want to get promoted.
8	Raplamaa	26	10	4	12	50	60	−10	34	
9	Otepää	26	10	2	14	63	69	−6	32	
10	Kuressaare II	26	9	2	15	38	93	−55	29	
11	Imavere (R)	26	9	2	15	41	84	−43	29	Relegation to III liiga.
12	Vaprus II (O)	26	8	4	14	42	66	−24	28	Qualification to Relegation play-offs.
13	Tõrva	26	8	4	14	41	67	−26	28	Weren't relegated to III liiga, because some teams dissolved.
14	Viimsi II (Note: Reserve teams are ineligible for promotion.) (R)	26	3	2	21	32	87	−55	11	Relegation to III liiga.

Updated to match(es) played on 22 October 2017. Source:
Rules for classification: 1) points; 2) goal difference; 3) number of goals scored
(C) Champions; (O) Play-off winners; (P) Promoted; (R) Relegated

=== III Liiga ===
==== North ====
Pos	Team	Pld	W	D	L	GF	GA	GD	Pts	Promotion, qualification or relegation
1	Volta (C, P)	22	20	1	1	116	23	+93	61	Promotion to II Liiga.
2	Hell Hunt	22	15	3	4	73	31	+42	48	Qualification to Promotion/relegation play-offs.
3	Kalev III (P)	22	14	3	5	86	43	+43	45	Promotion to II Liiga, because other teams didn't want to get promoted.
4	Retro	22	13	1	8	54	52	+2	40	
5	Eston Villa	22	11	2	9	43	42	+1	35	
6	Rumori Calcio	22	11	2	9	58	48	+10	35	
7	Reliikvia	22	10	3	9	44	44	0	33	Club didn't participate in the championship the following year.
8	Harju	22	7	6	9	53	51	+2	27	
9	Saku	22	6	4	12	37	52	−15	22	
10	Kalju III (O)	22	4	6	12	34	64	−30	18	Qualification to Relegation play-offs.
11	Kristiine (R)	22	4	3	15	35	87	−52	15	Relegation to IV Liiga.
12	Štrommi	22	0	0	22	27	123	−96	0	Weren't relegated to IV Liiga, because some teams dissolved.

Updated to match(es) played on 8 October 2017. Source:
Rules for classification: 1) points; 2) goal difference; 3) number of goals scored
(C) Champions; (O) Play-off winners; (P) Promoted; (R) Relegated

==== East ====
Pos	Team	Pld	W	D	L	GF	GA	GD	Pts	Promotion, qualification or relegation
1	Paide LM III (C, P)	22	21	0	1	112	8	+104	63	Promotion to II Liiga.
2	FCI III	22	15	4	3	73	27	+46	49	Qualification to Promotion/relegation play-offs.
3	Väätsa	22	13	2	7	56	37	+19	41	Club didn't participate in the championship the following year.
4	Järva-Jaani	22	12	3	7	69	41	+28	39	
5	Joker II	22	12	1	9	66	50	+16	37	Club didn't participate in the championship the following year.
6	Koeru	22	10	3	9	36	42	−6	33	
7	Ambla VM	22	8	3	11	48	52	−4	27	
8	Loo	22	7	5	10	42	62	−20	26	
9	Rada	22	7	2	13	38	61	−23	23	Club didn't participate in the championship the following year.
10	Augur	22	5	1	16	29	86	−57	16	Weren't relegated to IV Liiga, because some teams dissolved.
11	Tartu Helios	22	5	1	16	38	87	−49	16	Weren't relegated to IV Liiga, because some teams dissolved.
12	Lasnamäe Ajax II (Note: Reserve teams are ineligible for promotion.)	22	4	1	17	18	72	−54	13	Weren't relegated to IV Liiga, because some teams dissolved.

Updated to match(es) played on 8 October 2017. Source:
Rules for classification: 1) points; 2) goal difference; 3) number of goals scored
(C) Champions; (P) Promoted

==== South ====
Pos	Team	Pld	W	D	L	GF	GA	GD	Pts	Promotion, qualification or relegation
1	Welco II (C, P)	22	15	5	2	66	32	+34	50	Promotion to II Liiga.
2	Tarvastu	22	15	3	4	70	44	+26	48	Qualification to Promotion/relegation play-offs.
3	Vastseliina	22	13	3	6	68	46	+22	42	
4	Tartu	22	12	1	9	62	41	+21	37	Merged with Tartu FC Helios after the season.
5	Tammeka U19 (P)	22	12	0	10	74	45	+29	36	Promotion to II Liiga, because other teams didn't want to get promoted.
6	Tääksi	22	10	5	7	47	45	+2	35	Merged with Põhja-Sakala after the season.
7	Tulevik III (Note: Reserve teams are ineligible for promotion.)	22	9	6	7	54	45	+9	33	
8	Suure-Jaani	22	10	1	11	42	55	−13	31	
9	Jõgeva Wolves	22	9	3	10	44	39	+5	30	
10	EMÜ (O)	22	7	4	11	67	84	−17	25	Qualification to Relegation play-offs.
11	Fauna (R)	22	1	3	18	31	77	−46	6	Club didn't participate in the championship the following year.
12	Navi (R)	22	1	2	19	20	92	−72	5	Club didn't participate in the championship the following year.

Updated to match(es) played on 7 October 2017. Source:
Rules for classification: 1) points; 2) goal difference; 3) number of goals scored
(C) Champions; (O) Play-off winners; (P) Promoted; (R) Relegated

==== West ====
Pos	Team	Pld	W	D	L	GF	GA	GD	Pts	Promotion, qualification or relegation
1	Poseidon (C, P)	22	16	5	1	74	20	+54	53	Promotion to II Liiga.
2	Castovanni	22	16	2	4	70	33	+37	50	Merged with Põhja-Tallinna JK Volta after the season.
3	Läänemaa (P)	22	14	1	7	65	49	+16	43	Promotion to II Liiga, because other teams didn't want to get promoted.
4	Lihula	22	12	5	5	51	38	+13	41	
5	Kärdla LM	22	12	2	8	51	43	+8	38	
6	Rummu Dünamo	22	10	3	9	38	44	−6	33	
7	Zenit	22	9	3	10	56	62	−6	30	
8	Kose	22	8	3	11	29	44	−15	27	
9	Kernu	22	7	4	11	43	51	−8	25	
10	Raplamaa II (Note: Reserve teams are ineligible for promotion.) (R)	22	6	2	14	30	51	−21	20	Qualification to Relegation play-offs.
11	Lelle (R)	22	1	2	19	14	90	−76	5	Relegation to IV Liiga.
12	Pakri (R)	22	5	0	17	23	19	+4	15	Disqualified and relegated to IV Liiga.

Updated to match(es) played on 8 October 2017. Source:
Rules for classification: 1) points; 2) goal difference; 3) number of goals scored
(C) Champions; (P) Promoted; (R) Relegated

=== IV liiga ===
==== North/East ====
Pos	Team	Pld	W	D	L	GF	GA	GD	Pts	Promotion, qualification or relegation
1	Depoo (C)	16	10	4	2	50	26	+24	34	Decided not to get promoted.
2	Olympic Olybet	16	10	3	3	53	29	+24	33	Decided not to get promoted.
3	Anija (P)	16	9	6	1	32	15	+17	33	Promotion to III liiga.
4	Zapoos (O)	16	10	2	4	45	25	+20	32	Qualification to Promotion/relegation play-offs.
5	Piraaja II	16	6	2	8	29	32	−3	20	
6	Moe (P)	16	6	2	8	25	37	−12	20	Promotion to III liiga, because other teams didn't want to get promoted.
7	Tarvas II (P)	16	4	1	11	26	50	−24	13	Promotion to III liiga, because other teams didn't want to get promoted.
8	Maardu Aliens	16	3	2	11	30	47	−17	11	
9	Jalgpallihaigla	16	2	2	12	21	50	−29	8	

Updated to match(es) played on 8 October 2017. Source:
Rules for classification: 1) points; 2) goal difference; 3) number of goals scored
(C) Champions; (O) Play-off winners; (P) Promoted

==== North/West ====
Pos	Team	Pld	W	D	L	GF	GA	GD	Pts	Promotion, qualification or relegation
1	Haapsalu (C, P)	18	14	1	3	73	29	+44	43	Promotion to III liiga.
2	Püsivus (P)	18	12	2	4	54	29	+25	38	Promotion to III liiga.
3	TransferWise (P)	18	10	2	6	58	40	+18	32	Promotion to III liiga.
4	Igiliikur	18	9	4	5	37	27	+10	31	Qualification to Promotion/relegation play-offs.
5	Soccernet	18	9	2	7	44	42	+2	29	
6	Toompea	18	9	1	8	37	41	−4	28	
7	Keila II (P)	18	6	2	10	37	42	−5	20	Promotion to III liiga, because other teams didn't want to get promoted.
8	Reaal	18	4	3	11	30	44	−14	15	
9	Volta II (Note: Reserve teams are ineligible for promotion.)	18	3	3	12	22	46	−24	12	
10	Majandusmagistri Jalgpalliselts	18	4	0	14	16	68	−52	12	Club didn't participate in the championship the following year.

Updated to match(es) played on 8 October 2017. Source:
Rules for classification: 1) points; 2) goal difference; 3) number of goals scored
(C) Champions; (P) Promoted

==== South ====
Pos	Team	Pld	W	D	L	GF	GA	GD	Pts	Promotion, qualification or relegation
1	Warrior (C, P)	16	15	0	1	64	24	+40	45	Promotion to III liiga.
2	Poseidon II (Note: Parent team got promoted so they are eligible for promotion as well.) (P)	16	11	1	4	49	29	+20	34	Promotion to III liiga.
3	Helios II (P)	16	11	1	4	51	23	+28	34	Promotion to III liiga.
4	Elva II (O)	16	9	1	6	34	19	+15	28	Qualification to Promotion/relegation play-offs.
5	Lootos (P)	16	6	3	7	51	41	+10	21	Promotion to III liiga, because other teams didn't want to get promoted.
6	Pärnu	16	5	3	8	60	43	+17	18	Club didn't participate in the championship the following year.
7	Wolves II (Note: Reserve teams are ineligible for promotion.)	16	4	2	10	26	61	−35	14	
8	Tulevik IV	16	3	1	12	20	84	−64	10	Club didn't participate in the championship the following year.
9	Tõrva II	16	1	2	13	26	57	−31	5	Club didn't participate in the championship the following year.

Updated to match(es) played on 8 October 2017. Source:
Rules for classification: 1) points; 2) goal difference; 3) number of goals scored
(C) Champions; (O) Play-off winners; (P) Promoted

=== Promotion and relegation play-offs ===
In 2017, no promotion play-offs were played in the top three leagues (Meistriliiga, Esiliiga and Esiliiga B), because of the merging of Tallinna FC Levadia and FCI Tallinn and the relegation of JK Sillamäe Kalev

==== To II Liiga ====
Team 1	Agg.	Team 2	1st leg	2nd leg
FC Tarvastu (III S 2nd)	2:4	Tallinna FC Castovanni Eagles (III W 2nd)	2:4	-:+
Tallinna FC Castovanni Eagles (III W 2nd)	2:7	Pärnu JK Vaprus II (II S/W 12th)	1:0	1:7

Team 1	Agg.	Team 2	1st leg	2nd leg
Tallinna FC Hell Hunt (III N 2nd)	1:0	FCI Tallinn III (III E 2nd)	1:-	0:-
Tallinna FC Hell Hunt (III N 2nd)	14:1	Maardu United (II N/E 12th)	14:1	+:-

==== To III Liiga ====
Team 1	Agg.	Team 2	1st leg	2nd leg
Anija JK (IV N/E 3rd)	1:6	Võru FC Helios II (IV S 3rd)	1:0	0:6
Anija JK (IV N/E 3rd)	+:-	Raplamaa JK II (III W 10th)	+:-	+:-

Team 1	Agg.	Team 2	1st leg	2nd leg
Maarjamäe FC Igiliikur (IV N/W 4th)	3:4	Nõmme Kalju FC III (III N 10th)	3:2	0:2

Team 1	Agg.	Team 2	1st leg	2nd leg
Tallinna FC Zapoos (IV N/E 4th)	6:2	Tallinna JK Augur (III E 10th)	3:2	3:0

Team 1	Agg.	Team 2	1st leg	2nd leg
FC Elva II (IV S 4th)	6:6	EMÜ SK (III S 10th)	5:4	1:2

== Women's football ==
=== Naiste Meistriliiga ===
Pos	Team	Pld	W	D	L	GF	GA	GD	Pts	Qualification
1	Pärnu	14	14	0	0	125	2	+123	42	Championship group
2	Flora	14	12	0	2	92	10	+82	36	Championship group
3	Levadia	14	9	0	5	47	33	+14	27	Championship group
4	SK 10 Premium	14	7	0	7	31	61	−30	21	Championship group
5	Tallinna Kalev	14	5	2	7	23	43	−20	17	Relegation group
6	Tammeka	14	3	3	8	17	38	−21	12	Relegation group
7	Põlva FC Lootos	14	3	1	10	10	67	−57	10	Relegation group
8	Noortekoondis	14	0	0	14	0	91	−91	0	Relegation group

== Cup competitions ==
=== Estonian Cup ===
Fourth Round
Nõmme Kalju FC	1
Tallinna FC Flora	0
FCI Tallinn	2
Tallinna FC Levadia	1
FC Flora U21	1
Narva United FC	3
FC Kuressaare	5
Raplamaa JK II	0
EMÜ SK	0
Viljandi JK Tulevik	5
Tartu JK Tammeka	5
Rumori Calcio Tallinn	1
FC Molycorp Silmet	0
JK Tallinna Kalev	11
FCI Tallinn U21	1
Paide Linnameeskond	4

Quarterfinals
Nõmme Kalju FC	1 (3)
FCI Tallinn (a.e.t.)	1 (5)
Narva United FC	3
FC Kuressaare	1
Viljandi JK Tulevik	0
Tartu JK Tammeka (a.e.t.)	1
JK Tallinna Kalev	0
Paide Linnameeskond	3

Semifinals
FCI Tallinn	2
Narva United FC	0
Tartu JK Tammeka (a.e.t.)	0 (4)
Paide Linnameeskond	0 (2)

Final
FCI Tallinn	2
Tartu JK Tammeka	0

Home teams listed on top of bracket. (AET): At Extra Time
