= 2019 Estonian Small Cup =

Estonian football competition for amateurs

Tournament details
- Country: Estonia
- Teams: 67

The 2019 Estonian Small Cup is the 10th season of the Estonian amateur football knockout tournament. The tournament began in March 2019, and the final will take place in September 2019 at the A. Le Coq Arena, Tallinn. Saue JK are the current cup holders.

== First Round (1/64) ==
The draw was made by Estonian Football Association on 13 March 2019.

- League level of the club in the brackets.
- Rahvaliiga RL (people's league) is a league organized by Estonian Football Association, but not part of the main league system.

Home team	Score	Away team
28 March
FC Järva-Jaani (5)	1 : 2	Tallinn FC Ararat (4)
30 March
FC Maardu Aliens (5)	1 : 2	JK Loo (5)
31 March
Nõmme Kalju FC III (5)	2 : 3	Tallinna FC Eston Villa (5)

=== Byes ===
These teams were not drawn and secured a place in the second round without playing:

- II Liiga (4): JK Sillamäe Kalev, Lasnamäe FC Ajax, Tartu FC Santos, Tallinna JK Legion II, FC Jõgeva Wolves, Põhja-Tallinna JK Volta II, Tallinna JK Piraaja, FC Kose, Raasiku FC Joker, Viljandi JK Tulevik II, Põhja-Sakala, Pärnu JK Poseidon, Viimsi JK II, FC Flora U19, Raplamaa JK, Paide Linnameeskond III
- III Liiga (5): Türi Ganvix JK, Anija JK, SK Kadrina, FC Sillamäe, Tallinna FC Hell Hunt, Lilleküla JK Retro, Tallinna FC Zenit, Harju JK Laagri, Rumouri Calcio Tallinn, Maarjamäe FC Igiliikur, Tallinna FC Zapoos, FC Tarvastu and Tõrva JK ÜM, Valga FC Warrior, FC Otepää, EMÜ SK, FC Äksi Wolves, SK Illi and Jõgeva SK Noorus-96 ÜM, Tartu JK Tammeka IV, Tartu JK Welco X, JK Kernu Kadakas, Rummu Dünamo, Saarema JK aaMeraaS, Pakri SK Alexela, Saue JK, Kohila Püsivus, Pärnu JK Poseidon II, Märjamaa Kompanii, Pärnu Jalgpalliklubi II
- IV Liiga (6): Tallinna FC Soccernet, Tallinna FC TransferWise, FC Tallinna Wolves, Tallinna FC Eston Villa II, Tallinna FC Reaal, Kristiine JK, Tallinna JK Jalgpallihaigla, Viimsi Lõvid, Põlva FC Lootos
- Rahvaliiga (RL): Rasmus Värki jalgpallikool, Püssi SK, FC Sssolutions, JK Pärnu Sadam, Rumouri Calcio II, FC Maksatransport, FC Teleios, SC ReUnited

== Second round (1/32) ==
The draw was made by Estonian Football Association on 15 March 2019.

- League level of the club in the brackets.
- Rahvaliiga RL (people's league) is a league organized by Estonian Football Association, but not part of the main league system.

Home team	Score	Away team
31 March
Põlva FC Lootos (6)	1 : 9	Maarjamäe FC Igiliikur (5)
Tartu JK Tammeka IV (5)	2 : 5	Tallinna FC Hell Hunt (5)
Kristiine JK (6)	1 : 3	FC Tarvastu and Tõrva JK ÜM (5)
3 April
FC Jõgeva Wolves (4)	4 : 2	Anija JK (5)
7 April
SK Kadrina (5)	3 : 1	Tallinna FC Reaal (6)
Viljandi JK Tulevik II (4)	1 : 2	SC ReUnited (RL)
Viimsi Lõvid (6)	2 : 3	Püssi SK (RL)
9 April
Paide Linnameeskond III (4)	13 : 1	Tallinna FC Soccernet (6)
Põhja-Sakala (4)	0 : 4	Raasiku FC Joker (4)
FC Teleios (RL)	1 : 10	FC Sillamäe (5)
10 April
SK Illi and Jõgeva SK Noorus-96 ÜM (5)	0 : 8	FC Flora U19 (4)
Põhja-Tallinna JK Volta II (4)	– : 0	FC Sssolutions (RL)
Tallinna FC TransferWise (6)	4 : 1	FC Äksi Wolves (5)
Lilleküla JK Retro (5)	3 : 1	Rasmus Värki Jalgpallikool (RL)
17 April
Türi Ganvix JK (5)	3 : 1	Raplamaa JK (4)
FC Kose (4)	6 : 2	Pärnu JK Poseidon II (5)
EMÜ SK (5)	0 : 2	Tallinna FC Zapoos (5)
18 April
Kohila Püsivus (5)	0 : 3	Pärnu JK Poseidon (4)
Valga FC Warrior (5)	1 : 5	Tallinna FC Ararat (4)
21 April
Pakri SK Alexela (5)	1 : –	Tallinna FC Eston Villa II (6)
FC Maksatransport (RL)	3 : 2	Harju JK Laagri (5)
24 April
Tallinna JK Piraaja (4)	0 : 1	Saue JK (5)
JK Sillamäe Kalev (4)	6 : 0	FC Tallinna Wolves (6)
JK Kernu Kadakas (5)	4 : 0	Rumouri Calcio Tallinn (5)
Tartu JK Welco X (5)	8 : 0	Tallinna JK Jalgpallihaigla (6)
JK Pärnu Sadam (RL)	2 : 3	FC Otepää (5)
Saaremaa JK aaMeraaS (5)	0 : 4	Tartu FC Santos (4)
Rumouri Calcio II (RL)	0 : 7	Tallinna FC Zenit (5)
Tallinna FC Eston Villa (5)	1 : 3	Lasnamäe FC Ajax (4)
25 April
Rummu Dünamo (5)	0 : 4	JK Loo (5)
Märjamaa Kompanii (5)	1 : 3	Viimsi JK II (4)
1 May
Pärnu Jalgpalliklubi II (5)	0 : 12	Tallinna JK Legion II (4)

== Third round (1/16) ==
The draw was made by Estonian Football Association on 29 April 2019.

- League level of the club in the brackets.
- Rahvaliiga RL (people's league) is a league organized by Estonian Football Association, but not part of the main league system.

Home team	Score	Away team
unknown
Tallinna FC Zapoos (5)	– : 1	Lasnamäe FC Ajax (4)
Tartu JK Welco X (5)	2 : 0	FC Kose (4)
FC Maksatransport (RL)	– : 5	Lilleküla JK Retro (5)
Paide Linnameeskond III (4)	12 : 0	Püssi SK (RL)
FC Flora U19 (4)	6 : 0	Tallinna FC Ararat (4)
Maarjamäe FC Igiliikur (5)	3 : 1	JK Kernu Kadakas (5)
FC Otepää (5)	2 : 1	FC Jõgeva Wolves (4)
SK Kadrina (5)	– : 4	Türi Ganvix JK (5)
Viimsi JK II (4)	0 : 1	FC Sillamäe (5)
Tallinna FC Zenit (5)	0 : 0 (3 : 1)	JK Sillamäe Kalev (4)
Raasiku FC Joker (4)	4 : 0	FC Ssolutions (RL)
Tallinna FC TransferWise (6)	2 : 6	Saue JK (5)
Pärnu JK Poseidon (4)	10 : 2	JK Loo (5)
Tallinna JK Legion II (4)	0 : 2	FC Tarvastu and Tõrva JK ÜM (5)
Tartu FC Santos (4)	8 : 0	Tallinna FC Hell Hunt (5)
Pakri SK Alexela (5)	1 : 1 (3 : 5)	SC ReUnited (RL)

== Fourth round (1/8) ==
The draw was made by Estonian Football Association on 17 May 2019.

- League level of the club in the brackets.
- Rahvaliiga RL (people's league) is a league organized by Estonian Football Association, but not part of the main league system.

Home team	Score	Away team
5 June
Maarjamäe FC Igiliikur (5)	0 - 2	Saue JK (5)
FC Sillamäe (5)	1 - 3	Pärnu JK Poseidon (4)
Tartu FC Santos (4)	1 - 3	Tallinna FC Zenit (5)
Türi Ganvix JK (5)	3 - 3 (2:4 pso)	FC Tarvastu and Tõrva JK ÜM (5)
FC Otepää (5)	3 - 0	SC ReUnited (RL)
Lilleküla JK Retro (5)	3 - 0	Tartu JK Welco X (5)
12 June
Raasiku FC Joker (4)		FC Flora U19 (4)
Paide Linnameeskond III (4)		Lasnamäe FC Ajax (4)
