= 2020 II liiga =

Estonian football league season for fourth division

II liiga
- Season: 2020

The 2020 II liiga is the 26th season of the II liiga, fourth tier league for association football clubs in Estonia.

== East/North ==
Pos	Team	Pld	W	D	L	GF	GA	GD	Pts	Promotion, qualification or relegation
1	TJK Legion II	8	7	1	0	32	12	+20	22	Promotion to the Esiliiga B
2	Trans II	9	7	0	2	26	11	+15	21	Qualification for promotion play-offs
3	FCI Tallinn	9	6	0	3	23	10	+13	18	
4	FC Tallinn	8	5	2	1	22	8	+14	17	
5	Noorus-96	9	5	2	2	23	16	+7	17	
6	Põhja-Tallinna Volta	9	5	0	4	9	9	0	15	
7	Kohtla-Järve Järve II	9	4	0	5	18	24	−6	12	
8	Tartu Welco II	9	3	2	4	15	17	−2	11	
9	Jõgeva Wolves (R)	9	3	1	5	11	21	−10	10 (Note: Head-to-head points: Jõgeva Wolves 3, Sillamäe Kalev 0)	
10	Sillamäe Kalev	9	3	1	5	17	20	−3	10	
11	Tammeka III	9	2	2	5	14	23	−9	8	
12	Helios	9	2	1	6	14	27	−13	7	Qualification for relegation play-offs
13	Ajax Lasnamäe	9	1	3	5	18	26	−8	6	Relegation to III liiga
14	Maardu Linnameeskond II	9	1	1	7	9	27	−18	4	Relegation to III liiga

Updated to match(es) played on 19 July 2020. Source: Soccerway
Rules for classification: 1) Points; 2) Less matches awarded against; 3) Matches won; 4) Head-to-head points; 5) Head-to-head goal difference; 6) Goal difference; 7) Goals scored; 8) Fairplay ranking
(R) Relegated

== West/South ==
Pos	Team	Pld	W	D	L	GF	GA	GD	Pts	Promotion, qualification or relegation
1	Paide Linnameeskond III (X)	25	24	1	0	101	11	+90	73	Promotion to the Esiliiga B
2	Harju Laagri	25	19	1	5	104	40	+64	58	Qualification for promotion play-offs
3	Raasiku Joker	25	18	3	4	76	35	+41	57	
4	Saue	25	17	3	5	71	38	+33	54	
5	Kuressaare II	25	15	3	7	91	44	+47	48	
6	Viimsi II	25	12	2	11	55	48	+7	38	
7	Raplamaa	25	10	4	11	66	48	+18	34	
8	Piraaja Tallinn	25	10	3	12	50	70	−20	33	
9	Flora III	25	8	4	13	46	59	−13	28	
10	Vaprus II	25	8	2	15	46	74	−28	26	
11	Tulevik II	25	7	3	15	40	55	−15	24	
12	Põhja-Sakala (Q)	25	6	2	17	40	98	−58	20	Qualification for relegation play-offs
13	Kose (R)	25	2	3	20	34	89	−55	9	Relegation to III liiga
14	Pärnu Poseidon (R)	25	2	0	23	20	131	−111	6	Relegation to III liiga

Updated to match(es) played on 12 July 2020. Source: Soccerway
Rules for classification: 1) Points; 2) Less matches awarded against; 3) Matches won; 4) Head-to-head points; 5) Head-to-head goal difference; 6) Goal difference; 7) Goals scored; 8) Fairplay ranking
(Q) Qualified for the phase indicated; (R) Relegated; (X) Assured a place of the promotion play-offs if their upper team in ESILIIGA B is promoted to ESILIIGA
