= Delargy =

Delargy is a surname of Irish origin. From Ó Duibhlearga 'descendant of Duibhlearga' from a personal name meaning 'black one of Learga' or 'black one of the slope'.

The family name Delargy (Irish: Ó Duibhlearga) was first found in County Mayo (Irish: Maigh Eo) located on the West coast of the Republic of Ireland in the province of Connacht, where Ó Duibhlearga of Dunfeeny in the barony of Tirawley is described in the Book of Lecan as "loving not the Galls," the Galls being the Anglo-Norman settlers in northern Mayo.

== List of people with the surname ==
- Jamie Delargy (born 1953), Northern Irish journalist
- Pádraig Delargy (born 1996), Northern Irish politician

== See also ==
- Delarge
