= Tartu JK Welco =

Estonian football club

- Full name: Tartu Jalgpalliklubi Welco
- Nickname: Elektrikud (The Electricians)
- Founded: 2008; 18 years ago
- Ground: Holm Jalgpallipark
- Capacity: 580
- Chairman: Edgar Leht
- Manager: Alo Bärengrub
- League: Meistriliiga
- 2026: Esiliiga, 1st of 10 (champions; promoted)
- Website: https://jkwelco.ee
Home colours	Away colours

Tartu Jalgpalliklubi Welco is a professional football club based in Tartu, Estonia. The club was founded in 2008 when a group of university students decided to participate in IV liiga South, which is the 6th and lowest tier of the Estonian football pyramid. The first team of JK Welco currently competes in Esiliiga, the second-highest division in Estonian football. The club moved to their current home ground, Holm Park, after its completion in 2023.

Tartu Welco is the largest community-owned football club in Estonia, meaning the club is owned by its players and fans, who make up a general assembly of approximately 150 members. The club also has a reserve team in II Liiga as well as men's and women's amateur teams in lower tiers. Since 2019, the club has cooperated with Tartu Santos, which acts as the club's youth department. Tartu Welco's supporter group is known as Electric Legion and is one of the biggest and most prominent supporter groups in the Estonian club football scene.

== History ==
=== Formation ===
The history of the club began in November 2007, a year before its official founding, when a group of football enthusiasts led by Mirko Kikkamägi gathered under the name JK Masuudinaine to compete in a local Tartu football championship. After an unsuccessful debut in the competition, the team decided to enter the Estonian football championship and registered the team as JK Welco Elekter to play in IV Liiga South. The club's new name was taken from OÜ Welco Elekter, a local electricity company, which became the name sponsor of the club. In its first season, JK Welco Elekter's squad was mainly composed of inexperienced players. One exception was trequartista Mikk Valtna, a former Tartu JK Tammeka player who had briefly played in the Meistriliiga before joining.

=== Season 2008 ===
The club's debut season was challenged by squad problems and lack of organizational knowledge. As such, JK Welco Elekter finished its first season in IV Liiga South in 9th place, scoring 21 points across 22 games. The club played in the Estonian Small Cup, but only advanced to the 2nd round. JK Welco Elekter won its first trophy in the annual Estonian Football Association end-of-year tournament, finishing 3rd. Mikk Valtna was named MVP of the tournament.

=== Season 2009 ===
The players were much more experienced in the club's second season, and the experimental strategies of head coach Mirko Kikkamägi resulted in more success for the club. Also, the addition of Timo Kuus (who had previously also played for Meistriliiga on Tartu JK Tammeka) to the team made the defensive line much more confident and improved the team's performances. JK Welco Elekter finished the season in 3rd place with 11 wins and 35 points across 20 games. The team advanced to the play-off round to play for promotion to III Liiga, but lost 1 - 6 to JK Koeru. In the Estonian Small Cup, the team advanced to the quarterfinals, where they lost to Tallinna JK Piraaja 0 - 3.

=== Season 2010 ===
Season 2010 saw many organizational and squad changes in the club. The most significant of these was the hiring of experienced head coach Boris Hrabrov. Important additions to the squad included Eldar Rassulov and Sergei Ottšik, who both entered with years of experience in the Meistriliiga. Right back Priit Raamat took on the position of club chairman. JK Welco Elekter managed to finish the 2010 season 2nd in the league, with 52 points across 20 games. Mikk Valtna scored 35 goals in the league, the most of any Estonian footballer that year. This finish ensured the club's promotion into III Liiga. The club was less successful in the Estonian Cup and Estonian Small Cup, but they finished 3rd in the end-of-year tournament.

=== Season 2011 ===
Welco debut season in III Liiga South proved to be quite difficult for the team. Addition of experienced centre-back Juri Avdonin and former member of Estonian youth national team, winger Marti Pähn, gave the squad much needed depth, but Welco still struggled to find the back of the net in the 1st round, with star striker Mikk Valtna abroad. The club improved the performances in 2nd round and eventually finished the season with 4th place. Estonian Cup was a success for the team, since Welco advanced to 1/16-final and just narrowly missed the target, by losing away to Meistriliiga side FC Kuressaare 1–2. End of Year tournament gave yet another 3rd-place trophy to the team.

=== Season 2012 ===
The season 2012, which marks an anniversary 5th season of the club, proved to be very difficult. The team saw the departure of beloved lean mean goal machine Mikk Valtna, who joined inner-town rivals Meistriliiga side JK Tammeka Tartu. Also infamous midfield fighter Eldar Rassulov was unable to help the team in the first round. Additionally, squad problems occurred due to the fact that for the first time its history, club had to find players for two teams. All things considered, spring round was unsuccessful for the team and club's chair decided to part ways with head coach Boris Hrabrov. Debutant head coach Mikk Valtna took over the job and squad's performances started to improve. The return of Rassulov and addition of former Estonian u-14 youth national team player Marten Kihho helped to achieve 5th place in the league at the end of season. Both, the Estonian Small Cup and Estonian cup were unsuccessful – the team failed to record a win in cup competitions in 2012. The End of Year tournament brought a traditional 3rd place to the team.

=== Season 2013 ===
In the wake of the 2013, Welco's chair decided to take the challenge offered by the Estonian Football Association. Due to the reforms to the Estonian football league system, Welco had an opportunity to join the II Liiga. Welco decided to take on the challenge, though this meant that the season will be difficult. The management made a considerable amount of additions to the squad and the depth of the roster proved to be vital for the success for the team. In the league, Welco was constantly in the relegation zone, but due to the strong finish to the season, electricians managed to finish on the 11th spot, just out of the relegation. The Estonian Small Cup was much more successful to the team then on the previous seasons – team advanced to the 1/4 finals, but the team could not improve its best accomplishment in the competition and were held down by Saue JK 2–3. Also, the Estonian Cup was a huge success for the club – team advanced to 1/8-final and missed further stage of the competition by only the narrowest of margins – Esiliiga side FC Puuma defeated Welco in front Tartu home crowd 4–3.

=== Season 2014 ===
Season 2014 started with high ambitions – new off-season acquisitions Erki Kade, former Estonian U19 national team winger Siim Sillaots and Siim Kaasik from the in-town rivals Tartu SK 10 gave the electricians starting 11 a level of quality that proved to be enough to play for the highest places in the league. Also, some changes were made on the coaching staff – after a successful debut season as the head coach of Welco's reserves, the club chair decided to share the head coaching position between the Valtna brothers, bringing former Welco II coach Siim to the first team coaching staff. The season ended with 3rd place – and the team just missed the opportunity to play for the promotion to Esiliiga B. The team could not mirror the success in 2014–15 Estonian Cup nor in Estonian Small Cup – both competitions ended for Welco in the 1st round.

=== Season 2015 ===
In the wake of 2015 season, the general assembly of MTÜ JK Welco decided that all three teams managed by MTÜ JK Welco are competing under new name – Tartu JK Welco. Significant changes were also done in coaching and Siim Valtna took over as lone head coach, while his brother Mikk came back home and joined the proud Black-White Army on the field where he was given the privilege to be el capitan once again. Additionally, centre-back Lehar, Savikink and target-man Hannes Tiru from FC Levadia joined the ranks.

The season, ended with 2nd place and Welco played for promotion to Esiliiga B. In the first leg Welco won Tallinna FC Puuma 5–0 and although in the second leg the team had to face 0–2 loss, Welco ensured a place in Esiliiga B.

In 2015–16 Estonian Cup Welco made it to 1/16-final where the team faced Premium League team FC Flora. The game was played in Welco's homecourt in front of 747 spectators which set the record for recent years in Tartu – it was also Welco's record for home crowd. Welco lost the game to Flora 0–2. In Estonian Small Cup Welco made it to quarterfinal where FC Merkuur defeated Welco 4–1.

=== Season 2016 ===
The first season in the top leagues of Estonian football pyramid was a challenge for the club, since it brought more games, higher playing level and requirements for the organization. The team coped surprisingly well with higher league – with much help from new signings of Kristofer Reinberg, Hendrik Vellama and Kaarel Torop – and finished season on a third place which granted the team a play-off round for a place in Esiliiga against Nõmme Kalju FC U21 team.

Although Welco lost the first game at home 2:4, the Estonian football community was rocked by the infamous Hendrik Pürg Scandal. The aforementioned player was not eligible to play, but the managerial staff of Kalju still sent Pürg on pitch. This eventually meant that Kalju U21 was given a technical loss and Welco headed to Esiliiga for 2017 season.

The cup season was not a success for Welco as for second year in a row the team was drawn to play against FC Flora in the 1/32-round. The electricians did not hold their own on the pitch and lost 0:8 at home.

=== Season 2017 ===
The first season at the second-highest tier in Estonian football system proved to be a too tough bone to chew for the Electricians. Even though season started with a good win against inner-county rivals FC Elva, the team was able to pick up only three wins with remaining 35 games. Not surprisingly, 19 points were not enough to keep JK Welco out from relegation. As winter 2017 were turbulent times for Estonian football – two Meistriliiga clubs FCI Tallinn and FC Levadia decided to merge and JK Sillamäe Kalev were relegated to II liiga due to financial troubles, JK Welco was still able to keep the spot in Esiliiga for 2018 season.

=== 2018–present ===
In 2019, Tartu Welco started a cooperation with Tartu Santos, during which the first teams of the two clubs merged and Santos started to act as a youth academy to Tartu Welco. In 2023, the club moved to their new home ground Holm Park.

== Seasons and statistics ==
Season	League	Position	Games	Won	Drawn	Lost	Goal Difference	Points	Top Scorer
2008	IV Liiga South	9th	22	6	3	13	40:67	21	Kristjan Noormets (12)
2009	IV liiga South	3rd	20	11	2	7	58:26	35	Mikk Valtna (19)
2010	IV liiga South	2nd	20	17	1	2	100:16	52	Mikk Valtna (35)
2011	III liiga South	4th	22	12	6	4	36:24	42	Mikk Valtna (14)
2012	III liiga South	5th	22	11	1	10	35:40	34	Ragnar Suurmets (8)
2013	II liiga West/South	11th	26	7	5	14	39:59	26	Marten Kihho (9)
2014	II liiga East/North	3rd	26	15	6	5	49:31	51	Marten Kihho (8)
2015	II liiga East/North	2nd	26	17	5	4	64:36	56	Mikk Valtna (15)
2016	Esiliiga B	3rd	36	20	4	12	74:50	64	Mikk Valtna (14)
2017	Esiliiga	10th	36	4	7	25	30:100	19	Mikk Valtna (6)
2018	Esiliiga	6th	36	12	6	18	47:68	42	Mikk Valtna (12)
2019	Esiliiga	10th	36	6	6	24	39:89	24	Andree Porila and Karl Joosep Mark (7)
2020	Esiliiga B	2nd	30	20	2	8	81:50	62	Mikk Valtna (16)
2021	Esiliiga	10th	30	5	5	20	30:78	20	Karl Joosep Mark (6)
2022	Esiliiga B	4th	36	17	10	9	68:47	61	Karl Joosep Mark (11)
2023	Esiliiga B	1st	36	23	5	8	92:42	74	Martin Jõgi (31)

Champions	Runners-up	Promoted	Relegated

== Players ==
=== Current squad ===
As of 24 July 2026

Note: Flags indicate national team as defined under FIFA eligibility rules; some limited exceptions apply. Players may hold more than one non-FIFA nationality.

No.	Pos.	Nation	Player
2	DF	NGR	Lesor Timothy
3	DF	EST	Rasmus Kala
4	DF	EST	Markus Sossi
6	MF	EST	Tauno Tekko (captain)
8	MF	EST	Kenlou Laasner
9	FW	EST	Erik Mottus
10	FW	EST	Enrico Veensalu
11	FW	EST	Marko Mägi
13	DF	EST	Igor Sokolov
15	FW	EST	Andreas Kiivit
16	MF	EST	Andre Songisepp
17	FW	EST	Henry Käblik

No.	Pos.	Nation	Player
19	DF	EST	Jaagup Raudmäe
20	FW	EST	Mark Mugra
22	GK	EST	Marcus Agarmaa
24	DF	EST	Mihkel Sepp (on loan from Tammeka)
27	FW	EST	Hardi Ernits
28	DF	EST	Miikal Roos
32	DF	EST	Romet Salu
33	DF	EST	Taijo Teniste
36	MF	EST	Uku Malki
40	MF	EST	Sten Marten Viira
55	GK	EST	Andero Antsov (on loan from Tammeka U21)
88	FW	EST	Rendo Roots

== Managerial history ==
- (Estonia) Mirko Kikkamägi (2008–2010)
- (Estonia) Boris Hrabrov (2010–2012)
- (Estonia) Mikk Valtna (2012–2014)
- (Estonia) Siim Valtna (2014–2017)
- (Germany) Yusuf Erdogan (2018–2019)
- (Estonia) Janar Sagim (2019–2020)
- (Estonia) Meelis Eelmäe (2021)
- (Estonia) Jaanus Reitel (2022–2025)
- (Estonia) Alo Bärengrub (2026–present)

Mirko Kikkamägi was the first head coach and under his two-year reign, the team achieved 3rd place in the IV Liiga in 2009. Kikkamägi left the head coaching position to concentrate on his playing career and vacant job went to experienced Boris Hrabrov. Hrabrov brought new training methodology and added huge amount of professionalism to the squad of amateurs. Igor Antonov was the right-hand man of Hrabrov and served as consulting coach. Club decided to change the head coach once again in the middle of 2012 season – due to the underperforming team and lack of enthusiasm on field. Club's chair decided to offer the vacant head coach position to iconic star-striker Mikk Valtna. In the wake of 2014 season, club's chair decided to share head coaching position between Valtna brothers – after the successful debut in front of the Welco reserves, Siim Valtna was offered a position next to his brother Mikk as a coach of Welco's first team. After Mikk's decision to rejoin the black-white army of Welco on the field, Siim Valtna was the lone head coach of the first team.

Since the 2017 season in Esiliiga was unsuccessful for the black-and-white-army, the club's chair and Siim Valtna decided to part ways. The latter joined Meistriliiga side Tartu JK Tammeka as an assistant coach to Kaido Koppel – a former Welco first team goalkeeper and JK Welco found a new head coach from the newly-defunct FCI Tallinn – Yusuf Erdogan.

== Crest and Colours ==
The original crest of JK Welco was developed in the middle of the first, 2008 season. In 2014, the club held a 1-month-long play-off style competition to find a new and fresh logo. Not surprisingly, the fans chose a logo which is very similar to the original Lauri Särak design. Current JK Welco goalie was again the author of the winning crest. The lightning bolt symbolizes the club's initial name Welco Elekter (elekter = electricity in Estonian). Welco started playing in sky-blue shirt with black sleeves and all-black bottom. Kit producer was Hummel. During the 2010 season, club decided to change its appearance drastically and introduced distinctive black-on-white hoops design for shirt. Shorts remained black, but socks were changed to white. New kit was produced by Uhlsport. In the wake of 2013 season, the club planned to develop an eye-catching new away jersey for both teams. The club used the help of its supporters to decide which kit was the most suitable to serve as a second jersey for the originally black-whites. The winning jersey was a combination of white base with red back (that symbolizes the flag of club's home town Tartu), and already "legendary" black stripes. In 2016, the club once again held a competition with already well-known recipe to replace the iconic black on white hoops design. Overall 14 designers submitted 16 ideas for a new kit. The competition lasted for a week, gathered a whopping 1400 votes and had a total reach of 100,000 people on club's Facebook page. The competition was anonymous, but the winning design was not surprisingly again Särak's.

== Home ground ==
During its first two seasons, JK Welco Elekter constantly changed its home grounds. Both Tamme Stadium's artificial turf ground and Põllu tn stadium natural grass pitch served as home grounds. In the beginning of 2010 season, Welco moved its home ground to Annelinna kunstmurustaadion, mainly due to renovation of Tamme artificial turf. In the beginning of 2013, the turf was so amortized that club decided to move back to the first home ground Tamme Stadium's artificial turf ground. The club renovated the terraces for the spectators and the pitch now has a stand for up to 150 spectators.

Being promoted to the Esiliiga B in 2016 meant that the club had to move away from their beloved Tamme artificial pitch, since the regulations from the EJL did not allow to play on slightly undersized pitch. Thus, Welco moved their home games to the 1,638-seat Tamme Stadium. From 2020 until early 2023, the club again used Annelinna kunstmurustaadion as their home ground.

On 10 June 2023, Tartu Welco opened their very own home ground Holm Jalgpallipark, which the club had constructed for five years. The stadium is located adjacent to the Estonian National Museum and its wooden grandstand can seat 580 people.

== Honours ==
- Esiliiga B
  - Winners (1): 2023
  - Runners-up (1): 2020
- II Liiga
  - Runners-up (1): 2015
- IV Liiga
  - Runners-up (1): 2010
