= Holm Jalgpallipark =

Football stadium in Tartu, Estonia

- Holm Park
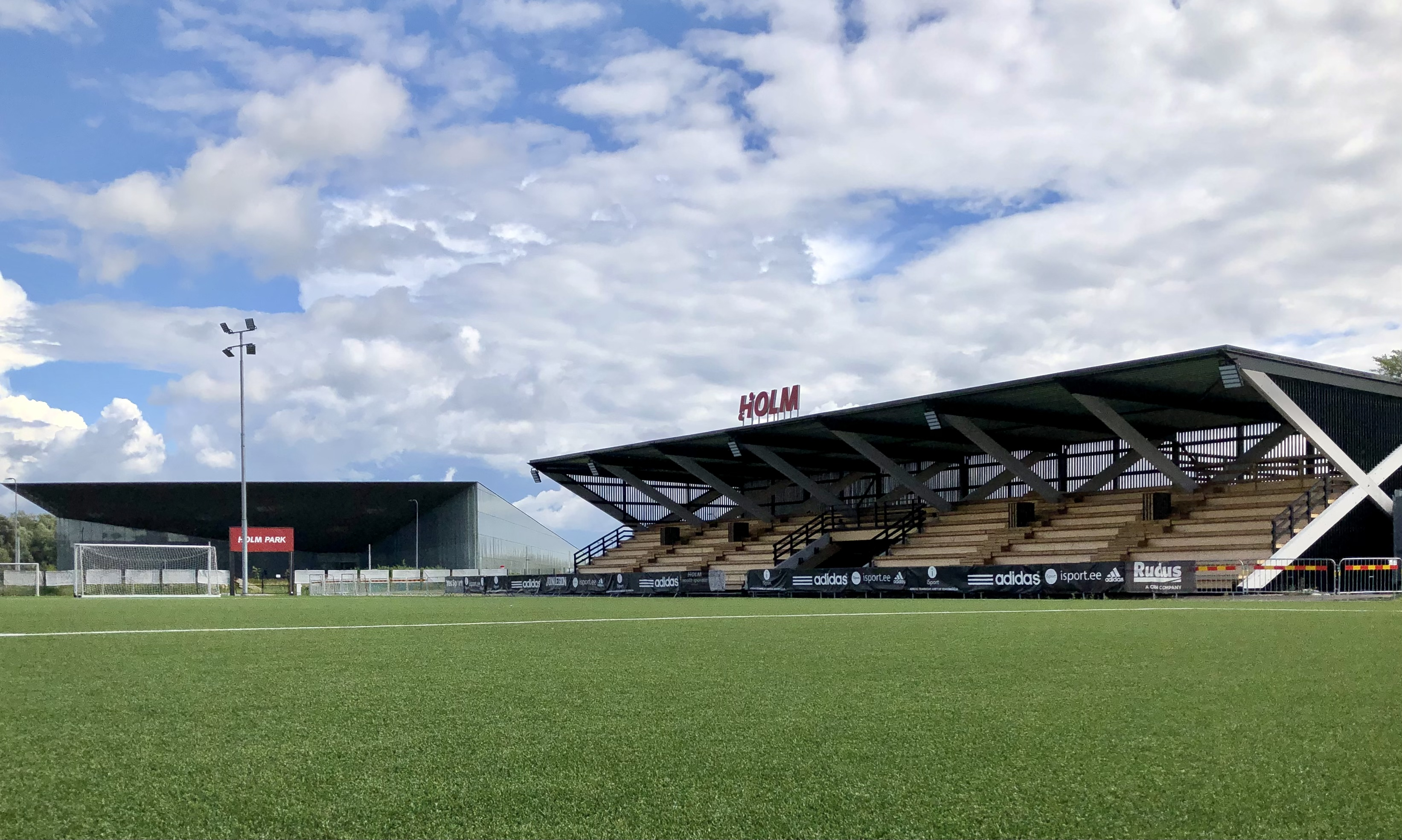
- Interactive map of Holm Jalgpallipark
- Location: Tartu, Estonia
- Coordinates: 58°23′39.1″N 26°44′27.5″E
- Owner: Tartu JK Welco
- Operator: Tartu JK Welco
- Capacity: 580
- Surface: Artificial turf
- Field size: 102 × 65 m

Construction
- Built: 2019–2023
- Opened: 10 June 2023; 3 years ago
- Cost: €910,000
- Architect: Andres Lunge

Tenant
- Tartu JK Welco (2023–present)

Website
- jalgpallipark.ee

Holm Jalgpallipark (English: Holm Football Park) is a football stadium in Tartu, Estonia. Located next to the Estonian National Museum and in the Raadi district, it is the home ground of Tartu JK Welco.

The stadium is named after Welco's primary sponsor Holm Bank.

== History ==
=== Planning and construction ===
In 2012, Tartu Welco began exploring ways to construct their own home ground and by 2015, the first sketches of the stadium in Raadi had been created by architect Andres Lunge. In June 2017, the plans were approved by the Tartu City Government, who issued a building permit for the stadium in the autumn of 2019.

The construction of the stadium commenced in November 2019 and the artificial turf field was opened for training in December 2020. However, the completion of the grandstand saw delays due to the rise of construction costs that were caused by the COVID-19 pandemic and the Russian invasion of Ukraine. In the spring of 2023, Welco started a crowdfunding campaign and gathered €60,000 to finish the construction.

In total, the budget of the project mounted to €910,000, of which €425,000 was for the construction of the football pitch and outdoor areas, €345,000 for the construction of the grandstand and €140,000 for the parking lot.

=== Opening ===
Although the football field was opened to trainings and lower league football matches already during the 2021 season, the official opening of the stadium took place on 10 June 2023, when Welco faced Tammeka U21 in front of 694 spectators.
