= Raplamaa JK =

Estonian football club

- Founded: 2012
- Ground: Rapla Ühisgümnaasiumi staadion; Rapla jalgpallihall
- Manager: Tarvi Tüvist
- League: III Liiga N/W
- 2025: II Liiga B, 13th
Home colours	Away colours

Raplamaa JK is an Estonian football club based in Rapla. Founded in 2012, they currently play in the II Liiga, the fourth tier of Estonian football.

== Players ==
=== Current squad ===
As of 2 August 2018.

Note: Flags indicate national team as defined under FIFA eligibility rules; some limited exceptions apply. Players may hold more than one non-FIFA nationality.

No.	Pos.	Nation	Player
—	MF	EST	Jürgen Andessalu
—	DF	EST	Olavi Andres
—	MF	EST	Oliver Andres
—	DF	EST	Alo Bärengrub
—	MF	EST	Kaupo Kantsik
—	DF	EST	Kalev Kungla
—		EST	Ahto Liivamäe
—	DF	EST	Veiko Linamäe
—	MF	EST	Ken Krister Maalinn
—	MF	EST	Sten Kenert Maalinn
—	MF	EST	Juhan Noode
—	MF	EST	Raigo Noode
—	MF	EST	Madis Nurmik
—	FW	EST	Kristjan Nõulik
—	DF	EST	Mert Olesk

No.	Pos.	Nation	Player
—	GK	EST	Rando Pajus
—	GK	EST	Kristjan Pallav
—	MF	EST	Siim-Sten Palm
—	FW	EST	Erlend Pettai
—	DF	EST	Priit Põldmaa
—	DF	EST	Tenno Samuel
—	FW	EST	Joel Siniallik
—	MF	EST	Viljo Sinikas
—	FW	EST	Janar Soomre
—		EST	Erich-Raimond Stepanjuga
—	MF	EST	Karl Tamme
—		EST	Martin Tilk
—	MF	EST	Ravel Toome
—	MF	EST	Tarvi Tüvist

== Statistics ==
=== League and Cup ===
Season	League											Top Goalscorer		Cup competitions		Notes
Season	Division	Pos	Teams	Pld	W	D	L	GF	GA	GD	Pts	Player	Goals	Estonian Cup	Small Cup	Notes
1994/95	II liiga W	3	7	12	8	1	3	42	16	+24	25			-		as Rapla JK Atli
1995/96	II liiga S/W	4	5	8	2	1	5	12	17	-5	7			First round		as Rapla JK Atli
1996/97	III liiga W	2	5	8	6	0	2	34	14	+20	18			Prelim. round		as Rapla JK Atli
1997/98	III liiga W	2	4	6	2	3	1	9	5	+4	9	(Estonia) Taivo Tüvist	2	Fourth round		as Rapla JK Atli
1998	III liiga W	4	6	10	4	0	6	14	23	-9	12	Four players	3			as Rapla JK Atli
1999	III liiga W	5	6	20	6	2	12	41	58	-17	20	(Estonia) Karel Voolaid	8	Second round		as Rapla JK Atli
2000	II liiga S/W	6	6	20	3	1	16	20	97	-77	10	(Estonia) Andri Hõbemägi (Estonia) Ergi Reinvald	5	First round		as Rapla JK Atli
2001	III liiga W	10	10	18	3	2	13	21	49	-28	11	Four players	4	-		as Rapla JK Atli
2002	V liiga S/W	4	8	14	8	2	4	27	29	-2	26	(Estonia) Rainar Laes	10	-		as Rapla JK Atli
2003	IV liiga E	2	10	18	12	4	2	56	12	+44	40	(Estonia) Rene Millen	11	-		as Rapla JK Atli
2004	III liiga N	5	10	18	8	1	9	30	44	-14	25	(Estonia) Oleg Glivenko	9	-		as Rapla JK Atli
2005	III liiga N	5	12	22	11	3	8	41	42	-1	36	Four players	5	-		as Rapla JK Atli
2006	III liiga N	9	12	22	5	4	13	31	53	-22	19	(Estonia) Rauno Andok	7	First round		as Rapla JK Atli
2007	III liiga N	7	12	22	7	3	12	36	47	-11	24	(Estonia) Mihkel Maltsar	5	First round		as Rapla JK Atli
2008	III liiga W	4	12	22	11	5	6	46	44	+2	38	(Estonia) Sander Niit	14	Third round		as Rapla JK Atli
2009	III liiga W	8	12	22	9	2	11	33	35	-2	29	(Estonia) Sander Niit (Estonia) Dmitri Langi	6	First round	Second round	as Rapla JK Atli
2010	III liiga W	4	12	22	13	1	8	50	34	+16	40	(Estonia) Sander Niit	9	First round	Second round	as Rapla JK Atli
2011	III liiga W	12	12	22	3	0	19	22	93	-71	9	(Estonia) Martin Maltsar	4	Second round	First round	as Rapla JK Atli
2012	III liiga W	8	12	22	8	3	11	42	55	-11	27	(Estonia) Sander Niit	12	Second round	Second round	as Rapla JK Atli
2013	III liiga W	5	12	22	12	1	9	57	53	+4	37	(Estonia) Sander Niit	20	Third round	Second round	as Rapla JK Atli
2014	III liiga N	5	12	22	11	3	8	59	48	+11	36	(Estonia) Teet Kallaste	17	Second round	First round	as Rapla JK Atli
2015	III liiga N	7	12	22	9	4	9	46	50	-4	31	(Estonia) Kristjan Nõulik	8	Second round	-	as Rapla JK Atli
2016	III liiga W	1	12	22	19	0	3	77	20	+57	57	(Estonia) Teet Kallaste	23	First round	Runners-up	as Raplamaa JK
2017	II liiga S/W	8	14	26	10	4	12	50	60	-10	34	(Estonia) Kristjan Nõulik	13	Second round	Second round	as Raplamaa JK
2018	II liiga S/W	14	14	26	4	4	18	40	80	-40	16	(Estonia) Ravel Toome	12	First round	First round	as Raplamaa JK
2019	II liiga S/W	9	14	26	9	5	12	48	60	-12	32	(Estonia) Kristjan Nõulik	9	First round	Second round	as Raplamaa JK
2020	II liiga S/W	7	14	26	11	4	11	71	48	+23	37	(Estonia) Teet Kallaste	16	First round	Second round	as Raplamaa JK
2021	II liiga S/W	3	14	22	14	4	4	59	32	+27	46	(Estonia) Taavi Laurits	17	Third round	Semifinal	as Raplamaa JK
2022	Esiliiga B		10	36										Third round		as Raplamaa JK
