= 2004–05 Estonian Cup =

Eesti Karikas

Tournament details
- Country: Estonia
- Teams: 20

Final positions
- Champions: Levadia
- Runners-up: TVMK

Tournament statistics
- Matches played: 25
- Goals scored: 116 (4.64 per match)

The 2004–05 Estonian Cup (Estonian: Eesti Karikas) was the 15th season of the Estonian football knockout tournament. Originally, winners of the cup qualified for the 2005–06 UEFA Cup first qualifying round. The defending champion, Levadia, was successfully defend the title, after winning the final 1–0, which was held at Kadriorg Stadium, Tallinn on 18 May 2005. Since the Levadia also win the 2004 Meistriliiga, the UEFA Cup places were moved to second and third positioned team in the league.

All in all, 20 teams took part of the competition.

== First round ==
Team 1	Score	Team 2
1 September
Sörve	1–0	HÜJK
Keskerakonna	0–9	Tallinna Kalev
Hansa United	0–2	Lelle
Elva	4–0	Toompea

== Second round ==
Team 1	Score	Team 2
6 November
Tallinna Kalev	0–2	TVMK
Dünamo	0–3	Tulevik
Sörve	0–24	Flora
Lelle	1–5	Valga
Elva	0–2	Alutaguse Lootus
7 November
Kuressaare	1–6	Levadia
Tervis Pärnu	1–5	Narva Trans
F.C.A. Estel	1–5	Merkuur

== Quarter-finals ==
The first legs were played on 9 March 2005, and the second legs on 23 March and 6 April 2005.

Team 1	Agg.	Team 2	1st leg	2nd leg
Valga	0–9	TVMK	0–4	0–5
Narva Trans	4–1	Merkuur	3–0	1–1
Levadia	5–1	Tulevik	5–1	0–0
Flora	11–0	Alutaguse Lootus	1–1	10–0

== Semi-finals ==
The first legs were played on 27 April 2005, and the second legs on 4 May 2005.

Team 1	Agg.	Team 2	1st leg	2nd leg
Levadia	6–0	Flora	4–0	2–0
Narva Trans	1–5	TVMK	0–2	1–3

== Final ==
18 May 2005	Levadia	1–0	TVMK	Tallinn
	Leitan 88'			Stadium: Kadrioru staadion Attendance: 700; Referee: Hannes Kaasik
