= Delage (disambiguation) =

Delage is a French automobile manufacturer.

Delage or Delâge may also refer to:

== People ==
- Cyrille-Fraser Delâge (1869–1957), Quebec politician
- Guy Delage, French swimmer who claimed to have crossed the Atlantic solo
- Louis Delâge (1874–1947), French automobile engineer and manufacturer
- Maurice Delage (1879–1961) French composer and pianist
- Mickaël Delage (born 1985), French professional cyclist
- Pierre Delage (1887–1918), French aviator
- Roger Delage (1922–2001), French musicologist and conductor
- Yves Delage (1854–1920), French zoologist

== Other uses ==
- Delage (group), a British girl pop group in the 1990s
- Lac-Delage, a town and lake in Canada

== See also ==
- Nieuport-Delage, a French aeroplane manufacturing company
- Delarge (disambiguation)
