= II liiga =

Estonian football league

- Country: Estonia
- Confederation: UEFA
- Divisions: II East/North; II West/South
- Number of clubs: 28 (14 in each division)
- Level on pyramid: 4
- Promotion to: Esiliiga B
- Relegation to: III liiga
- Domestic cup(s): Estonian Cup; Estonian Small Cup
- Current champions: Paide Linnameeskond III (2018)
- Current: 2025 II liiga

II liiga is the fourth level of football league competition in Estonia arranged by the Estonian Football Association. It consists of 28 teams, divided geographically into two divisions with 14 teams each in group North/East and South/West. Until 2013, it was the third level league.

== Competition ==
During the season, teams play each opponent twice, once at home and once away, for 26 matches. At the end of the season, the winners of both divisions face each other in one final match to determine the champion of II liiga. As in most countries with low temperatures in winter time, the season starts around April and lasts until around the start of November.

At the end of the season, the winners of both divisions may be promoted to the Esiliiga B, provided the clubs meet the licensing criteria of the Esiliiga B. Second placed clubs of the divisions face each other in a play-off, the winner of which will play with Esiliiga B eight placed (third bottom) club for promotion to the Esiliiga.

Two clubs from the bottom end of both divisions are relegated to the III liiga. Third bottom clubs in both divisions will play a playoff with winners of playoffs of III liiga second placed clubs.

== II Liiga North/East ==
=== 2019 season ===
2019 II N/E liiga consists of 14 teams. Nine of them remain the same, one was promoted from III liiga South, one from III liiga West and two were relegated from higher divisions. Promoted teams are Põhja-Tallinna JK Volta II and FC Jõgeva Wolves and relegated teams are Tartu FC Santos (from Esiliiga) and Lasnamäe FC Ajax (from Esiliiga B). Tallinna JK Legion II joined the league from II S/W liiga. These teams replaced Tartu FC Santos II and Maardu United (dissolved), Põhja-Tallinna JK Volta (promoted) as well as Raasiku FC Joker and Tallinna JK Piraaja (transferred to II S/W liiga).

==== Clubs ====
Location of the 2018 II liiga N/E teams

The following clubs are competing in II liiga North/East during the 2019 season.

Club	2018	Location	Titles	Last best finish
Ajax	9th in Esiliiga B	Tallinn	1	1st (2002)
Ararat	7th	Tallinn	0	3rd (2008)
FCI Tallinn	2nd	Tallinn	0	2nd (2018)
Järve II	8th	Jõhvi	0	8th (2018)
Legion II	6th in II liiga S/W	Tallinn	0	–
Maardu LM II	10th	Maardu	0	10th (2017)
Noorus	4th	Jõgeva	0	4th (2018)
Santos	7th in Esiliiga	Tartu	0	–
Sillamäe	3rd	Sillamäe	2	1st (2000)
Tammeka III	12th	Tartu	0	12th (2018)
Trans II	6th	Narva	0	4th (2016)
Volta II ^{a}	2nd in III liiga West	Tallinn	0	–
Welco II	9th	Tartu	0	9th (2018)
Wolves	4th in III liiga South	Jõgeva	0	–

^{a} – ineligible for promotion to Esiliiga B

== Statistics ==
=== Winners ===
Season	1st place, gold medalist(s)	Points	2nd place, silver medalist(s)	Points	3rd place, bronze medalist(s)	Points	Top goalscorer	Goals
1995–96	Maardu Olümpia	14	JK Sillamäe Kalev	11	Narva Baltika	11		
1996–97	Tallinna Dokker	23	Kohtla-Järve Eliit	17	Muuga Sadam	14		
1997–98	Tallinna KSK Vigri	28	Kohtla-Järve Veteranid	24	Kiviõli Irbis	23		
1998	Narva Baltika	23	M.C. Tallinn	22	Tallinna JK Dünamo	21	(Estonia) Heigo Välja (M.C. Tallinn)	10
1999	Tallinna JK Dünamo	41	Štrommi Tallinn	31	Kiviõli JK Irbis	30	(Estonia) Erik Šteinberg (Kiviõli JK Irbis)	12
2000	JK Sillamäe Kalev	40	Kohtla-Järve SK Järve	31	Maardu FS Junior	25	Konstantin Butajev (Maardu FS Junior)	12
2001	Narva Alstom Kick Sai	39	TJK-83 Tallinn	38	Maardu FS Junior	32	Konstantin Butajev (Maardu FS Junior)	20
2002	Tallinna FC Ajax Estel	60	M.C. Tallinn	34	Narva SK Kick Sai	26	(Estonia) Aleksei Titov (Tallinna FC Ajax Estel)	39
2003	Tallinna JK Dünamo (2)	67	Tallinna FC TVMK II	66	Tallinna FC Levadia II	53	(Estonia) Andrei Afanasov (FS Junior Maardu)	26
2004	JK Tallinna Kalev	69	Tartu JK Merkuur-Juunior	65	FC Puuma	45	(Estonia) Andrei Usmanov (Tartu JK Merkuur-Juunior)	28
2005	Nõmme JK Kalju	59	Alutaguse FC Lootus	52	FC Levadia-Juunior	47	(Estonia) Andrus Mitt (Nõmme JK Kalju)	28
2006	Narva Trans II	69	Sillamäe Kalev	57	JK Tallinna Kalev II	42	(Russia) Aleksandr Avdeev (Sillamäe Kalev)	34
2007	Kiviõli Tamme Auto	60	VJK Rakvere	52	Tallinna FC Ararat	51	(Estonia) Alar Petrovits (VJK Rakvere)	25
2008	Kohtla-Järve FC Lootus	69	Tallinna JK Legion	64	Tallinna FC Ararat	50	(Estonia) Anton Semjonov (Kohtla-Järve FC Lootus)	28
2009	Jõhvi JK Orbiit	59	Tallinna JK Dünamo	55	Kohtla-Järve JK Alko	55	(Estonia) Andrei Afanasov (JK Tallinna Kalev U21)	25
2010	Tallinna FC Puuma	59	Tallinna FC Atletik	55	Nõmme Kalju FC II	41	(Estonia) Sten Teino (Tallinna FC Puuma)	26
2011	Rakvere JK Tarvas	68	Nõmme Kalju FC II	61	JK Sillamäe Kalev II	56	(Estonia) Joonas Ljaš (Rakvere JK Tarvas)	27
2012	Jõhvi FC Lokomotiv (2)	66	JK Sillamäe Kalev II	53	Nõmme Kalju FC II	50	(Belarus) Artisom Kavaliou (Kohtla-Järve JK Alko)	21
2013	Maardu FC Starbunker	59	FC Infonet II Tallinn	57	FCF Tallinna Ülikool	54	(Ukraine) Klimentii Boldyrev (Maardu FC Starbunker)	26
2014	Paide Linnameeskond II	61	Raasiku FC Joker 1993	55	Tartu JK Welco	51	(Estonia) Mairo Tikerberi (Jõgeva SK Noorus-96)	27
2015	Paide Linnameeskond U21 (2)	61	Tartu JK Welco	56	JK Luunja	53	(Estonia) Rauno Kööp (Paide Linnameeskond U21)	20
2016	Tartu FC Merkuur	58	Jõhvi FC Lokomotiv	52	FC Lasnamäe Ajax	51	(Estonia) Marek Šatov (Tartu FC Merkuur)	28
2017	Tallinna JK Legion	60	Tallinna FC Levadia III	51	Võru FC Helios	49	(Estonia) Marek Šatov (Tallinna FC Levadia III); Rejal Alijev (Tallinna JK Legion)	33
2018	Põhja-Tallinna JK Volta	57	FCI Tallinn	57	JK Sillamäe Kalev	56	(Estonia) Vassili Kulik (JK Sillamäe Kalev)	23
2019	FCI Tallinn	64	JK Sillamäe Kalev	59	Narva JK Trans II	56	(Estonia) Sander Pabo (FCI Tallinn)	29
2020	Tallinna JK Legion II	60	FC Tallinn	60	FCI Tallinn	57	(Estonia) Tarvi Suvi (Tartu FC Helios)	30
2021	Paide Linnameeskond III	57	FA Tartu Kalev	55	FCI Tallinn	49		

- Bold teams were promoted

== II Liiga South/West ==
=== 2018 season ===
II Liiga South/West
- Number of clubs: 14
- Current champions: FC Nõmme United (2017)
- Most championships: FC Santos Tartu (3)
- Website: II Liiga

2018 II S/W Liiga consists of 14 different teams. Eight of them remain the same. Two were promoted from III Liiga West, one from III Liiga North and one from III Liiga East. They were Pärnu JK Poseidon, Läänemaa JK, JK Tallinna Kalev III and Paide Linnameeskond III. One team was transferred from II Liiga N/E. It was Tallinna JK Legion II. Remaining team was relegated from Esiliiga B, which was Viimsi JK. These teams replaced FC Nõmme United, Pärnu Jalgpalliklubi and FC Flora U19 (all promoted), Saue JK Laagri, SK Imavere and Viimsi JK II. Also Tallinna JK Dünamo changed its name to Tallinna JK Legion II.

=== Clubs ===
Location of the 2018 II liiga N/E teams

The following clubs were competing in II liiga South/West during the 2018 season.

Club	2017	Location	Titles	Last best finish
Poseidon ^{a, b}	1st in III Liiga W	Pärnu	0	–
Ganvix ^{a, b}	5th	Türi	0	2nd (2015)
Legion II ^{a, b, c}	–	Tallinn	0	–
Kuressaare II ^{a}	10th	Kuressaare	1	1st (2003)
Kalev III ^{a, b}	3rd in III Liiga N	Tallinn	0	–
Läänemaa ^{a, b}	3rd in III Liiga W	Haapsalu	0	–
Otepää ^{a, b}	9th	Otepää	0	9th (2017)
Paide Linnameeskond III ^{a, b}	1st in III Liiga E	Paide	0	–
Raplamaa ^{a, b}	8th	Rapla	0	8th (2017)
Tabasalu ^{a, b}	3rd	Tallinn	0	3rd (2017)
Tulevik U21	4th	Viljandi	0	2nd (1994/95)
Tõrva ^{a, b}	13th	Karksi-Nuia	0	7th (2016)
Vaprus II ^{a, b}	12th	Pärnu	0	12th (2017)
Viimsi	7th in Esiliiga B	Haabneeme	1	1st (2012)

^{a} – never been relegated from II liiga
^{b} – never played in Esiliiga B/Esiliiga
^{c} – ineligible for promotion to Esiliiga B

== Statistics ==
=== Winners ===
Season	1st place, gold medalist(s)	Points	2nd place, silver medalist(s)	Points	3rd place, bronze medalist(s)	Points	Top goalscorer	Goals
1995–96	Pärnu United	21	Lokomotiiv Valga	16	Merkuur Tartu	11		
1996–97	Merkuur Tartu	28	Tartu Jalgpallikool	18	Märjamaa Kompanii	14		
1997–98	FC Lelle	21	Hiiu Kalur Kärdla	20	Tartu Jalgpallikool	16		
1998	FC Lelle	27	Hiiu Kalur Kärdla	17	Märjamaa Kompanii	13	(Estonia) Ott Purje (FC Lelle)	14
1999	Merkuur Tartu	54	Hiiu Kalur Kärdla	37	Tervis Pärnu	30	(Estonia) Martti Pukk (Hiiu Kalur Kärdla)	24
2000	Pärnu FC Levadia	49	Paide Arieks	35	Hiiu Kalur Kärdla	30	(Estonia) Martti Pukk (Hiiu Kalur Kärdla)	22
2001	JK Tammeka Tartu	45	Pärnu JK Vaprus	43	Muhumaa JK	33	(Estonia) Kristjan Tiirik (JK Tammeka Tartu)	20
2002	JK Tervis Pärnu	49	FC Hiiu Kalur Kärdla	32	Sörve JK	32	(Estonia) Maikko Mölder (Sörve JK)	24
2003	Sörve JK	57	FC Hiiu Kalur Kärdla	55	HÜJK Emmaste	42	(Estonia) Martti Pukk (FC Hiiu Kalur Kärdla)	26
2004	Pärnu JK Vaprus	76	FC Elva	58	FC Hiiu Kalur Kärdla	42	(Estonia) Indrek Joost (Pärnu JK Vaprus)	28
2005	Pärnu Pataljoni JK	62	FC Tarvastu	58	FC Elion	49	(Estonia) Sergei Zenjov (Pärnu Pataljoni JK)	27
2006	Tartu Välk 494	59	FC Tarvastu	55	Pärnu Pataljoni JK	54	(Estonia) Ants Palumaa (FC Tarvastu)	30
2007	Paide FC Flora	61	Sörve JK	59	Tartu JK Maag Tammeka III	54	(Estonia) Rauno Rikberg (Paide FC Flora)	34
2008	Tartu FC Santos	58	FC Nõmme United	55	Viljandi JK Tulevik II	48	(Estonia) Ivar Sova (FC Nõmme United)	27
2009	FC Nõmme United	58	Tartu JK Tammeka II	57	Türi Ganvix JK	43	(Estonia) Ivar Sova (FC Nõmme United)	39
2010	Tartu FC HaServ	62	HÜJK Emmaste	52	FC Nõmme United	47	(Estonia) Sander Lepik (FC Nõmme United)	20
2011	Tartu FC HaServ	62	Tartu JK Tammeka II	62	Paide Kumake	54	(Estonia) Rasmus Luhakooder (Viljandi JK Tulevik)	23
2012	HÜJK Emmaste	69	Viljandi JK Tulevik	56	Vändra JK Vaprus	51	(Estonia) Ergo Eessaar (Tartu SK 10 II)	39
2013	Tartu FC Santos	73	Sörve JK	49	Türi Ganvix JK	48	(Estonia) Alar Alve (Tartu FC Santos) (Estonia) Sander Lepik (FC Nõmme United)	25
2014	JK Tallinna Kalev U21	61	FCF Tallinna Ülikool	59	Saue JK Laagri	36	(Estonia) Karl Anton Sõerde (Viimsi MRJK)	28
2015	FCF Tallinna Ülikool	63	Türi Ganvix JK	53	Viljandi JK Tulevik U21	52	(Estonia) Rauno Nõmmiko (FCF Tallinna Ülikool)	32
2016	Paide Linnameeskond II	67	Keila JK	62	FC Nõmme United	60	(Estonia) Kevin Mätas (FC Nõmme United)	38
2017	FC Nõmme United	71	Pärnu Jalgpalliklubi	60	JK Tabasalu	48	(Estonia) Mark Kolosov (FC Nõmme United)	50
2018	Paide Linnameeskond III	71	Viimsi JK	65	JK Tabasalu	54	(Estonia) Ken-Marten Tammeveski (Viimsi JK)	27
2019	Paide Linnameeskond III	64	JK Tallinna Kalev III	56	Läänemaa JK	49	(Estonia) Juhan Jograf Siim (Tallinna JK Piraaja)	35
2020	Paide Linnameeskond III	76	Harju JK Laagri	59	Raasiku FC Joker	57	(Estonia) Marek Suursaar (FC Kuressaare II)	38

- Bold teams were promoted

== Promotion ==
In addition to league winners, second placed teams also get a chance to get promoted. First of all, both second placed teams play each other and the winner goes to the second round, where it meets with Esiliiga B 8th placed team. The winner of this game gets to compete in Esiliiga B.

=== First round ===
Season	II N/E 2nd	II S/W 2nd	Game 1	Game 2
2011	Nõmme JK Kalju II	Tartu JK Tammeka II	1:0	1:5
2012	JK Sillamäe Kalev U21	Viljandi JK Tulevik	0:0	1:4
2013	Tallinna FC Infonet II	Sörve JK	3:2	5:2
2014	Raasiku FC Joker 1993	FCF Tallinna Ülikool	w/o	w/o
2015	Tartu JK Welco	Türi JK Ganvix	w/o	w/o
2016	Jõhvi FC Lokomotiv	Keila JK	0:1	0:8
2017	Tallinna FC Levadia III	Pärnu Jalgpalliklubi	w/o	w/o
2018	FCI Tallinn	JK Tabasalu	–:4	w/o
2019	JK Sillamäe Kalev	Läänemaa JK	2:1	2:0

=== Second round ===
First round Winner	Esiliiga/Esiliiga B 8th	Game 1	Game 2
Tartu JK Tammeka II	Pärnu Linnameeskond	1:0	0:1 (5:4 p)
Viljandi JK Tulevik	Tartu JK Tammeka II	1:1	2:1 (aet)
Tallinna FC Infonet II	Tallinna JK Dünamo	6:1	5:0
Raasiku FC Joker 1993	Tallinna FC Ararat TTÜ	3:1	4:6
Tartu JK Welco	FC Puuma	5:0	0:2
Keila JK	Viimsi JK	2:1	0:1
Pärnu Jalgpalliklubi^{1}			
JK Tabasalu	Lasnamäe FC Ajax	3:0	4:1
JK Sillamäe Kalev			

Notes

- Note 1: No promotion play-offs were played because FCI Tallinn and Tallinna FC Levadia merged and JK Sillamäe Kalev was relegated to II liiga because of financial difficulties.

== II liiga finals ==
Every season II Liiga North/East and II Liiga South/West winners compete in a match. The winner is named the II liiga champion.

2012	Jõhvi FC Lokomotiv	0–3	HÜJK Emmaste	Tallinn, Estonia
14:00		Report	Janar Tükk 27'; Kristjan Paapsi 46'; Ergo Reinvald 89'	Stadium: Sportland Arena; Attendance: 25; Referee: Grigori Ošomkov

2013	Tartu FC Santos	2–1	Maardu FC Starbunker	Tartu, Estonia
10:00	Taavi Vellemaa 62'; Alar Alve 87'	Report	Vadim Šalabai 25'	Stadium: Tamme Stadium; Attendance: 76; Referee: Mart Martin

2014	JK Tallinna Kalev II	2–1	Paide Linnameeskond II	Tallinn, Estonia
19:30	Timo Paal 7'; Mikk Mario Mõistlik 62'	Report	Tarmo Paju 17'	Stadium: Kalevi Keskstaadion; Attendance: 35; Referee: Andrei Karhu

2015	FCF Tallinna Ülikool	4–1	Paide Linnameeskond II	Tallinn, Estonia
19:30	Robert Veskimäe 10'; Sander Lepik 71'; Mark Kolosov 86'; Rasmus Munskind 90'	Report	Volodja Erdei 5'	Stadium: Sportland Arena; Attendance: 30; Referee: Aleksei Smirnov

2016	Paide Linnameeskond II	8–0	Tartu FC Merkuur	Paide, Estonia
13:00	Carl Tubarik 3' (pen.); Martin Saar 9', 34'; Rauno Rikberg 37', 42', 63'; Priit Raal 39'; Andre Mägi 85'	Report		Stadium: Paide linnastaadion Attendance: 75; Referee: Paul Kask

2017	FC Nõmme United	2–2 (2–4 p)	Tallinna JK Legion	Tallinn, Estonia
19:00	Rasmus Värk 17'; Mark Kolosov 66'	Report	Jevgeni Baranov 25'; Kirill Vinogradov 38'	Stadium: Wismari staadion Attendance: 55; Referee: Roman Daniljuk

2018	Paide Linnameeskond III	4–0	Põhja-Tallinna JK Volta	Tallinn, Estonia
13:00	Carl Tubarik 20', 60'; Rauno Rikberg 64', 66'	Report		Stadium: Kadrioru staadion Attendance: 127; Referee: Tanel Üprus
