= FCF Tallinna Ülikool =

Estonian football club

- Full name: FCF Tallinna Ülikool
- Founded: 2011
- Ground: Sportland Arena
- Capacity: 500
- League: II Liiga

FCF Tallinna Ülikool (FC Flora Tallinn University) is an Estonian amateur football club based in Tallinn. The club was founded in 2011. The team currently plays in the II liiga, the fourth highest level of Estonian football. They qualified for the quarter-finals of the 2014–15 Estonian Cup.
