= Rumori Calcio Tallinn =

Estonian football club

Rumori Calcio
- Founded: 17 March 2015; 11 years ago
- Ground: Kalevi Keskstaadion artificial turf
- Capacity: 270
- President: Angelo Palmeri
- League: III liiga North/West
- Website: http://rumoricalcio.eu/
Home colours

Rumori Calcio is an Estonian football club based in Tallinn. Founded in 2015, the club is best known for being an international football team for expatriates living in Tallinn.

Since their founding, Rumori has had players of over 30 different nationalities play for the club. Rumori Calcio currently competes in the North/West division of III liiga, and also has a reserve team that competes in IV liiga, managed by Gabriele Haddad, a former player of Rumori.

== History ==
Rumori Calcio was founded on 17 March 2015 in Hiiu Pub in Nõmme by Italians Angelo Palmeri and Samuele De Pizzol, Georgians Archil Chochia and Erekle Dzotsenidze and Turk Yenal Turan with the aim of providing an international environment through football to foreigners living in Tallinn.

The club first began playing in the Estonian non-league Rahvaliiga, but entered IV liiga in the following year. Rumori made their debut in the Estonian league system by playing at the artificial turf ground next to Kalevi Keskstaadion and finished the 2016 IV liiga North/West division season in third place, thus earning promotion to III liiga. The club played in III liiga North division from 2017 until their relegation in 2020, were again promoted from IV liiga in 2021 and have since then competed in the Western division of III liiga.

In 2022, Rumori Calcio was featured in a BBC article introducing the Estonian Cup.

== Stadium ==
Rumori Calcio uses the 270-capacity artificial turf ground adjacent to the Kalevi Keskstaadion as their home ground. The club's trainings during winter and early spring months take place at the Kotka indoor football hall.

== Seasons and statistics ==
Season	Division	Pos	Pld	W	D	L	GF	GA	GD	Pts	Top goalscorer	Cup
2016	IV liiga N/W	3rd	18	10	3	5	49	24	+25	33	(Germany) Christoph Puschmann (13)	Fourth round
2017	III liiga N	6th	22	11	2	9	58	48	+10	35	(Germany) Christoph Puschmann (17)	Fourth round
2018	III liiga N	6th	22	8	7	7	46	39	+7	31	(Estonia) Reber Gruzdev (19)	Second round
2019	III liiga N	8th	22	8	2	12	48	47	+1	26	(Estonia) Valentin Bnatov (9)	Second round
2020	III liiga N	11th	22	3	3	16	37	88	–51	12	(Poland) Tomasz Leszczyński (Estonia) Mihhail Katõhhin (8)	Second round
2021	IV liiga N	3rd	14	8	3	3	33	18	+15	27	(Algeria) Walid Remmas (8)	Second round
2022	III liiga W	7th	22	11	3	8	74	38	+36	36	(Poland) Tomasz Leszczyński (13)	Second round
2023	III liiga W	5th	18	8	0	10	36	48	–12	24	(France) Gregory Vivas (7)	Second round
2024	III liiga W	7th	20	9	2	9	48	44	+4	29	(Russia) Aleksandr Kukharev (8)	Second round
2025	III liiga N	4th	21	9	2	10	49	47	+2	29	(Germany) Christoph Puschmann (12)	Second round
