= Delarge =

Delarge or De Large is a French surname. Notable people with the surname include:

- Alex DeLarge, a fictional character in Stanley Kubrick's film A Clockwork Orange (based on by Anthony Burgess' novel)
- Dzon Delarge (born 1990), Congolese footballer
- Fernand Delarge (1903–1960), Belgian boxer
- Jean Delarge (1906–1977), Belgian professional boxer
- Jean Delarge (athlete) (1893–1992), Belgian middle-distance runner
- Robert C. De Large (1842–1874), American politician

== See also ==
- Delage (disambiguation)
