= FCI Tallinn II =

Estonian football club

- Full name: FCI Tallinn II
- Founded: 2011
- Dissolved: 2017; 8 years ago
- Ground: Infonet Lasnamäe Stadium
- Capacity: 500
- League: Esiliiga
- 2017: Esiliiga, 7th
- Website: https://www.fcinfonet.ee

FCI Tallinn II is an Estonian football team based in Tallinn, Estonia.

It is the reserve team of FCI Tallinn.

In 2017, Tallinna FC Levadia and FCI Tallinn joined, which resulted in their reserves also joining and becoming Tallinna FCI Levadia U21.

== Statistics ==
=== League and Cup ===
Season	League	Pos	Pld	W	D	L	GF	GA	GD	Pts	Top goalscorer	Cup
2011	II Liiga E/N	7	26	11	3	12	57	59	−2	36	(Estonia) Deniss Sõtšov (8)	
2012	II Liiga E/N	12	26	6	3	17	26	59	−33	21	(Estonia) Aleksei Demutski (4)	R1
2013	II Liiga E/N	2	24	18	3	3	80	15	+65	57	(Estonia) Anton Muraveiko (11)	R3
2014	Esiliiga B	1	36	32	3	1	124	34	+90	99	(Estonia) Eduard Golovljov (17)	Quarter-finals
2015	Esiliiga	3	36	20	6	10	108	48	+60	66	(Estonia) Eduard Golovljov (41)	R3
2016	Esiliiga	3	36	18	2	16	98	81	+17	56	(Estonia) Eduard Golovljov (39)	R4
2017	Esiliiga	7	36	13	4	19	60	85	−25	43	(Estonia) Eduard Golovljov (20)	
