= Estonian Small Cup =

Estonian football competition for amateurs

- Founded: 2005
- Region: Estonia
- Teams: 77 (2025)
- Qualifier for: UEFA Regions' Cup
- Current champions: Paide Linnameeskond III (4th title)
- Most championships: Paide Linnameeskond III (4 titles)
- Website: Jalgpall.ee

The Estonian Small Cup is a knock-out competition for Estonian amateur teams, which play in the 4th or lower level. The first competition was won by Kohtla-Järve JK Alko in 2005 and the latest title was given to Paide Linnameeskond III. Finals have been held in Tallinn, A. Le Coq Arena since 2007.

== Finals ==
3 September 2005	Kohtla-Järve JK Alko	3:2	Lasnamäe FC Ajax II	Tallinn, Estonia
	Fjodorov 6'; Bulõgin 43'; Urlih 67'		Kulesov 78'; Gaidajenko 84'	Stadium: Kadrioru Stadium

29 August 2006	Tallinna FC Ararat TTÜ	1:0	Kohtla-Järve JK Alko	Tallinn, Estonia
	Ivahnenko 90+1'			Stadium: Kadrioru Stadium

5 September 2007	Tallinna FC Ararat TTÜ	1:0	FC Anži Tallinn	Tallinn, Estonia
	Harutunjan 35'			Stadium: A. Le Coq Arena; Attendance: 150; Referee: Ainar Kuusk

26 August 2008	Tallinna FC Ararat TTÜ	3:1	JK Atli Rapla	Tallinn, Estonia
	Titov 15', 25', 28'		Glivenko 89'	Stadium: A. Le Coq Arena; Attendance: 210; Referee: Mart Martin

3 September 2009	Tallinna FC Ararat TTÜ	2:3	Tartu FC HaServ	Tallinn, Estonia
18:00	Apalinski 48', 53'	(Report)	Serikov 45', 89'; Mamontov 68'	Stadium: Kadrioru staadion Attendance: 100; Referee: Mart Martin

31 August 2010	HÜJK Emmaste	3:1	FC Puuma	Tallinn, Estonia
17:45	Barnwell 21', 54'; Reinvald 31'	(Report)	Lõsanov 14'	Stadium: Kadrioru staadion Attendance: 787; Referee: Roomer Tarajev

24 August 2011	Jõhvi JK Orbiit	2:1	Tabasalu Palliklubi	Tallinn, Estonia
18:45	Kulik 32'; Marašov 79'	(Report)	Martinson 21'	Stadium: A. Le Coq Arena; Attendance: 194; Referee: Neeme Neemlaid

30 August 2012	Tallinna FC Ararat TTÜ	1:2	HÜJK Emmaste	Tallinn, Estonia
18:45	Godovanets 38'	(Report)	Paapsi 10', 30'	Stadium: A. Le Coq Arena; Attendance: 1,147; Referee: Andrei Karhu

12 September 2013	Paide Linnameeskond II	0:4	FCF Tallinna Ülikool	Tallinn, Estonia
19:00		(Report)	Munskind 20', 59'; Minlibajev 25'; Lepp 41' (o.g.)	Stadium: A. Le Coq Arena; Attendance: 821; Referee: Maikel Mikson

11 September 2014	Lasnamäe FC Ajax	1:1 (4:5 p)	Narva United FC	Tallinn, Estonia
19:00	Tasso 51'	(Report)	Aleksandrov 61'	Stadium: A. Le Coq Arena; Attendance: 504; Referee: Grigori Ošomkov

9 September 2015	FCF Tallinna Ülikool	1:2	Tartu FC Merkuur	Tallinn, Estonia
19:00	Veskimäe 28'	(Report)	Pruttšenko 41'; Šatov 45'	Stadium: A. Le Coq Arena; Attendance: 362; Referee: Kristo Külljastinen

21 September 2016	Tartu FC Merkuur	6:3	Raplamaa JK	Tallinn, Estonia
19:00	Gussev 12'; Šatov 43', 61', 64'; Haljak 66'; Šabanov 90+1'	(Report)	Sinikas 21'; Bärengrub 38', 45+1'	Stadium: A. Le Coq Arena; Attendance: 429; Referee: Miko Pupart

7 September 2017	JK Retro	1:5	Paide Linnameeskond III	Tallinn, Estonia
19:00	Jevdokimov 70'	(Report)	Laurits 5'; Mägi 47'; Lellsaar 77'; Rikberg 83'; Erdei 89'	Stadium: A. Le Coq Arena; Attendance: 337; Referee: Toomas Nõmmiste

12 September 2018	Raasiku FC Joker	0:2	Saue JK	Tallinn, Estonia
19:00		(Report)	Paju 65'; Suvi 78'	Stadium: A. Le Coq Arena; Attendance: 693; Referee: Paul Kask

11 September 2019	FC Otepää	1:4	Paide Linnameeskond III	Tallinn, Estonia
19:00		(Report)		Stadium: A. Le Coq Arena; Attendance: 277; Referee: Kristjan-Eric Lääne

21 October 2020	Tallinna JK Legion II	3:2	Tallinna FC Zenit	Tallinn, Estonia
19:00		(Report)		Stadium: A. Le Coq Arena; Attendance: 368; Referee: Dmitri Kirilov

23 September 2021	FC Kuressaare II	2:3	Tallinna FC Zapoos	Tallinn, Estonia
20:00		(Report)		Stadium: A. Le Coq Arena; Attendance: 451; Referee: Karl Kena

3 September 2022	Rakvere JK Tarvas	1:1 (3:2 p)	Tallinna FC Flora U19	Tallinn, Estonia
15:00		(Report)		Stadium: A. Le Coq Arena; Attendance: 636; Referee: Richard Toom

13 September 2023	Tallinna FC Zapoos	0:2	Saue JK	Tallinn, Estonia
19:00		(Report)		Stadium: A. Le Coq Arena; Attendance: 1374; Referee: Priit Alekask

31 August 2024	Maardu Linnameeskond	1:1 (4:5 p)	Paide Linnameeskond III	Tallinn, Estonia
14:30		(Report)		Stadium: A. Le Coq Arena; Attendance: 591; Referee: Oliver Väät

30 August 2025	Paide Linnameeskond III	4:2	FC Hiiumaa	Tallinn, Estonia
14:30		(Report)		Stadium: A. Le Coq Arena; Attendance: 500; Referee: Erik Reinumägi

== Winners ==
Club	Winners	Winning years
Paide Linnameeskond III	4	2017, 2019, 2024, 2025
FC Ararat Tallinn	3	2006, 2007, 2008
HÜJK Emmaste	2	2010, 2012
Saue JK	2	2018, 2023
Tartu FC Merkuur	2	2015, 2016
FC Vaprus Pärnu	1	2001
FCF Tallinna Ülikool	1	2013
Jõhvi JK Orbiit	1	2011
Kohtla-Järve JK Alko	1	2005
Rakvere JK Tarvas	1	2022
Tallinna FC Zapoos	1	2021
Tallinna JK Legion II	1	2020
Tartu FC HaServ	1	2009

== Finalists ==
Club	Finals	Years
FC Ararat Tallinn	5	2006, 2007, 2008, 2009, 2012
Paide Linnameeskond III	4	2017, 2019, 2024, 2025
Kohtla-Järve JK Alko	2	2005, 2006
HÜJK Emmaste	2	2010, 2012
Tallinna FC Zapoos	2	2021, 2023
Saue JK	2	2018, 2023
FC Vaprus Pärnu	1	2001
FC Lasnamäe Ajax II	1	2005
FC Anži Tallinn	1	2007
JK Atli Rapla	1	2008
Tartu FC HaServ	1	2009
FC Puuma	1	2010
Jõhvi JK Orbiit	1	2011
Tabasalu Palliklubi	1	2011
Paide Linnameeskond II	1	2013
FCF Tallinna Ülikool	1	2013
JK Retro	1	2017
Raasiku FC Joker	1	2018
FC Otepää	1	2019
Tallinna JK Legion II	1	2020
Tallinna FC Zenit	1	2020
FC Kuressaare II	1	2021
Rakvere JK Tarvas	1	2022
Tallinna FC Flora U19	1	2022
Maardu Linnameeskond	1	2024
FC Hiiumaa	1	2025
