= Football in Estonia =

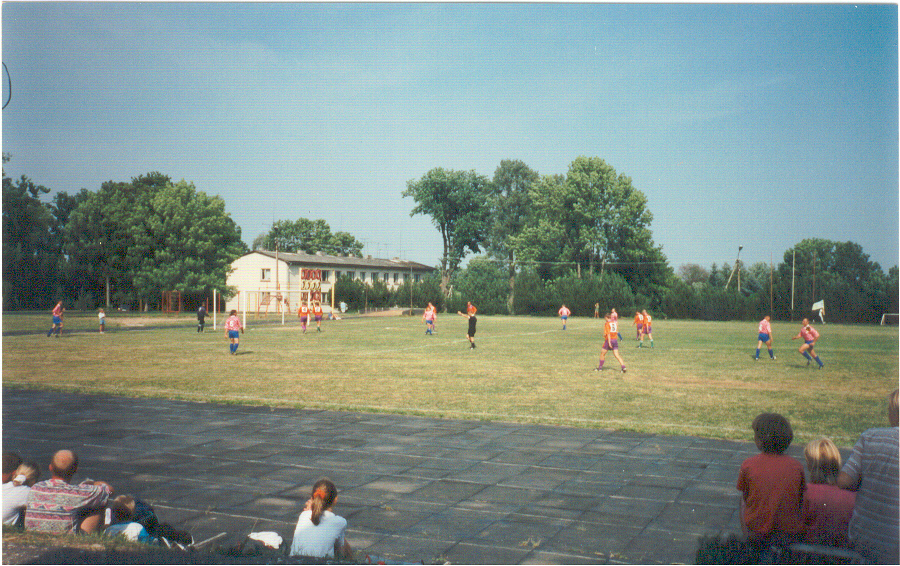
- Country: Estonia
- National team: men's national team

National competitions
- Estonian Cup

Club competitions
- Meistriliiga

International competitions
- Champions League; Europa League; Europa Conference League; Super Cup; FIFA Club World Cup; FIFA World Cup (National Team); European Championship (National Team); UEFA Nations League (National Team)

Football in Estonia is governed by the Estonian Football Association (Eesti Jalgpalli Liit). The EJL controls the domestic club championships (Meistriliiga, II liiga, III liiga, IV liiga; Naiste Meistriliiga, Naiste Esiliiga, Naiste II liiga), the Estonian Cup, Estonian SuperCup, Estonian Small Cup and the national teams (Estonia national football team, Estonia women's national football team, all youth teams).

== Domestic championship ==
=== Men's ===
The Estonian football league system is a series of interconnected leagues for club football in Estonia. Reserve teams play in the same league pyramid as their senior teams, but as in most other leagues, cannot be promoted to the same division. The system has a hierarchical format with promotion and relegation between leagues at different levels, and allows even the smallest club to dream of rising to the very top of the system. An additional league, Esiliiga B, was added between Esiliiga and II Liiga for the 2013 season. In 2013 there were 145 teams in 12 leagues, although the exact number of clubs varies from year to year as clubs join and leave leagues or fold altogether.

- Meistriliiga – Top division, consists of Professional, Semi-professional and Amateur club sides.
- Esiliiga – Second tier of Estonian club football, consists of Amateur and Reserve clubs. Winner wins automatic promotion to the top division, runner up plays in the promotion/relegation play-off.
- Esiliiga B – Third tier of Estonian club football, consists of Amateur and Reserve clubs. Winner wins automatic promotion to the second division, runner up plays in the promotion/relegation play-off.
- II Liiga – Fourth level of Estonian club football consists of two regional divisions – North/East and South/West, winners of each division win automatic promotion to the Esiliiga B.
- III Liiga – Fifth level of Estonian club football is divided into four regional divisions – North, East, South and West. Winners of every division win automatic promotion to II Liiga.
- IV Liiga – Sixth level of Estonian League pyramid is divided into three divisions – North/East, South and North/West.

Cup competitions:

- Estonian Cup – an annual knock-out competition for all clubs, which, unlike league competitions, follows the autumn–spring season.
- Estonian Small Cup – an annual knock-out competition for clubs from II Liiga and lower, follows the autumn–spring season.
- Estonian Supercup – annual season opener between last season's Meistriliiga and Estonian Cup winners.

== The league system ==
=== Men's ===
The table below shows the current structure of the system. For each division, its official name, its name in English and number of clubs is given. Each division promotes to the division(s) that lie directly above it and relegates to the division(s) that lie directly below it.

Level	League(s)/Division(s)
1	Meistriliiga (Premier League); 10 teams
	↓↑ 1–2 clubs
2	Esiliiga (First Division); 10 teams
	↓↑ 2–3 clubs
3	Esiliiga B (First Division B); 10 teams
	↓↑ 2–3 clubs
4	II liiga (Second Division); 28 teams divided in 2 series of 14 clubs
	↓↑ 4–6 clubs
5	III liiga (Third Division); 48 teams divided in 4 series of 12 clubs
	↓↑ 8–12 clubs
6	IV liiga (Fourth Division); 26 teams divided in 3 series of 6 clubs and 1 serie of 8 clubs

== National teams ==
=== Men's ===
The Estonia national football team took part in the qualifying campaigns for the 1934 and 1938 FIFA World Cups in Italy and France respectively. In 1940–1991 Estonia could not participate in international competitions because it was part of the Soviet Union. After Estonia regained its independence, from the 1994 FIFA World Cup, in all qualifying campaigns for both the World and European Championships, although they have, so far, failed to qualify for any major competition. The country has given the international goalkeeper star Mart Poom. Estonia advanced to the UEFA EURO 2012 qualifying play-offs against the Republic of Ireland.

Estonia's highest FIFA ranking (47th) came in March 2012.

== Most successful clubs overall ==
As of 23 May 2026

local and lower league organizations are not included.

Club	Domestic Titles				
Club	Meistriliiga & Liiduklass	Eesti Karikas	Eesti Superkarikas	Liivimaa karikas	Total
Flora	**16**	9	**12**	**3**	**40**
Levadia	11	**11**	9	-	31
Sport	9	1	-	-	10
Nõmme Kalju	2	2	2	-	6
TVMK / Nikol	1	3	2	-	6
Estonia	5	-	-	-	5
Narva Trans	-	3	2	-	5
Norma	2	1	-	-	3
TJK	2	1	-	-	3
Lantana	2	-	1	-	3
Tallinn	1	1	1	-	3
Tallinna Sadam	-	2	1	-	3
Kalev	2	-	-	-	2
Paide Linnameeskond	-	1	1	-	2
Tartu Olümpia	1	-	-	-	1
Levadia II	-	1	-	-	1

- The articles in italic indicate the defunct leagues and the defunct cups.
- The figures in **bold** indicate the most times this competition has been won by a team.

== Attendances ==
The average attendance per top-flight football league season and the club with the highest average attendance:

Season	League average	Best club	Best club average
2025	376	Flora	637
2024	406	Flora	713

== See also ==
- Estonia national football team
- Estonia women's national football team
- Estonian Footballer of the Year
- Meistriliiga
- Esiliiga
- Estonian Cup
- Estonian SuperCup
- List of active football clubs in Estonia
- Estonian County Competition
