= JK Tulevik U21 Viljandi =

Estonian football club

Tulevik II
- Full name: Viljandi JK Tulevik U21
- Ground: Viljandi Stadium
- Capacity: 1,068
- President: Raiko Mutle
- Manager: Sander Post
- League: II liiga
- 2021: II liiga S/W, 9th
- Website: http://www.jktulevik.ee
Home colours	Away colours

Viljandi JK Tulevik U21 is the reserve team of Estonian football club Viljandi Tulevik. They are currently playing in the II Liiga, the fourth level of football league competition in Estonia.

Reserve teams in Estonia play in the same league system as the senior team, but must play at least one level below their main side.
