= Narva United FC =

Estonian football club

- Full name: Narva United FC
- Founded: 2014; 11 years ago
- Ground: Narva FAMA Stadium
- Manager: Aleksandr Dmitrijev
- League: II Liiga E/N
- 2016: II Liiga E/N, 4th
- Website: http://www.narvaunited.ee/
Home colours

Narva United FC is a futsal, football, beach soccer, and senior football club based in Narva, Estonia.

This club was founded in 2012 and currently plays futsal in Meistriliiga (Estonian top division) and also beach soccer in Eesti Rannaliiga.

From 2014 to 2017 Narva United also played football in the Estonian III league, and II Liiga E/N.

Narva United futsal team were champions of Estonia in 2016/2017, and were participants of last ever UEFA Futsal Cup Preliminary Round in August 2017*

- Since season 2018 official tournament name UEFA Futsal Champions League

During three matches in Mostar, Bosnia and Herzegovina, Narva United had one win over Flamurtari (champions of Albania).

Narva United finished three times in second place in Estonian futsal (2012/2013, 2015/2016, 2017/2018), and three times finished third (2019/2020, 2020/2021, 2024/2025).

Narva United is the most attended futsal club in Estonia and holds the National Futsal league match attendance record. 10 out of 13 seasons (since 2012) Narva United were most attended futsal team in Estonia*

- Season 2020/2021 not included. Because of COVID-19 restrictions, 90% of league matches were played without fans.

Narva United futsal team were honored as the best Ida-Virumaa region sport team in 2017, and best Narva sport team in 2017 and 2021.

Narva United football team were also the reserve team of Narva Trans (during 2016 and 2017 seasons).

During the 2015 season Narva United football team won Estonian "Väike Karikas" (Small Cup) Trophy, Estonian Football Association official tournament for teams playing in lower divisions (starting from Second League and lower) Final match were played on A.Le Coq Arena, central football stadium of Estonia. Narva United - Ajax Tallinn 1-1 (4-3 pen)

Since season 2022/2023 Narva United has three teams in futsal: main team in Meistriliiga top division of Estonia, second team (in league 1), and women futsal team. Starting from season 2023/2024 there is also Narva United U18 team, participating in U18 Eliitliiga Estonian Youth Futsal top division, where team finished second in 2023/2024 and first in 2024/2025.

- President of Narva United FC: Oleg Kašin
- CEO of Narva United FC: Aleksandr Dmitrijev

Narva United coaches with UEFA C / UEFA B FUTSAL / UEFA B category:

- Aleksandr Dmitrijev
- Valeri Smelkov
- Volodymyr Lonshakov

== Honours ==
=== Futsal Domestic ===
Narva United - Futsal Meistriliiga (Estonian top division / Estonian championship):

- Winner: 2016/2017
- Second place (3): 2012/2013, 2015/2016, 2017/2018
- Third Place (3): 2019/2020, 2020/2021, 2024/2025

Narva United U18 futsal team (U18 Eliitliiga Futsal / Top division of youth futsal):

- Winner: 2024/2025
- Second place: 2023/2024

=== Football Domestic ===
- III Liiga E

Runners-up (2): 2014, 2015
Väike Karikas (National Cup for amateur teams): Winner: 2014

== Statistics ==
=== League and Cup ===
Season	Division	Pos	Pld	W	D	L	GF	GA	GD	Pts	Top goalscorer	Cup
2014	III Liiga E	2	22	17	1	4	63	23	+40	50	Ivan Seleznjov (16)	Second round
2015	III Liiga E	2	22	16	4	2	104	21	+83	81	Ivan Seleznjov (27)	First round
2016	II Liiga N/E	4	26	13	6	7	84	58	+26	45	Vitaly Andreev (22)	Fourth round
2017	II Liiga N/E	8	26	11	4	11	52	74	-22	37	Vitaly Andreev (22)	Third round
