= Raasiku FC Joker =

Estonian football club

Raasiku Joker
- Full name: Raasiku FC Joker
- Founded: 1993; 33 years ago
- Ground: Raasiku Stadium
- Capacity: 1,000
- Chairman: Jaan Jalas
- Manager: Andre Ilves
- League: II liiga
- 2024: III liiga East, 1st

Raasiku FC Joker are a football club based in Raasiku, Estonia, who play in the II liiga.

== History ==
Season	League	Pos	Pld	W	D	L	GF	GA	GD	Pts	Top Goalscorer	Cup
1993–94	II Liiga	5	10	2	2	6	18	30	−12	6		
2000	V Liiga	6	15	2	0	13	6	54	−48	6		
2002	IV Liiga	7	18	6	3	9	58	51	+7	21		
2003	IV Liiga	1	18	13	1	4	69	27	+42	40		
2004	III Liiga	10	18	3	0	15	19	95	−76	9		
2008	IV Liiga	1	20	17	2	1	86	20	+66	53	(Estonia) Andre Ilves (25)	
2009	III Liiga	2	22	18	2	2	71	23	+48	56	(Estonia) Andre Ilves (17)	
2010	II Liiga	13	24	5	4	15	33	45	−12	19	(Estonia) Rene Lill (10)	Quarter-finals
2011	III Liiga	4	22	12	2	8	46	36	+10	38	(Estonia) Rando Randjõe (19)	Third round
2012	III Liiga	1	22	17	0	5	63	26	+37	51	(Estonia) Janar Pragi (Estonia) Ott Reinike (12)	First round
2013	II Liiga	10	24	6	4	14	31	64	−33	22	(Estonia) Rene Lill (9)	Third round
2014	II Liiga	2	26	16	7	3	76	31	+45	55	(Estonia) Rene Lill (17)	Second round
2015	Esiliiga B	5	36	14	11	11	66	57	+9	53	(Estonia) Rene Lill (12)	Second round
2016	Esiliiga B	7	36	14	10	12	74	66	+8	52	(Estonia) Rauno Esop (25)	First round
2017	Esiliiga B	8	36	13	7	16	58	73	-15	46	(Estonia) Markko Kudu (25)	Second round
2018	II liiga N/E	5	26	14	2	10	56	44	+12	54	(Estonia) Rando Randjõe (21)	-
2019	II liiga S/W	11	26	8	3	15	46	60	-14	27	(Estonia) Markko Kudu (11)	-
2020	II liiga S/W	3	26	18	3	5	77	37	+40	57	(Estonia) Rando Randjõe (22)	-
2021	II liiga S/W	10	23	8	4	11	45	53	-8	28	(Estonia) Rando Randjõe (15)	-
2022	III liiga E	2	20	13	1	6	65	39	+26	40	(Estonia) Rando Randjõe (21)	-
2023	III liiga E	9	22	6	4	12	27	54	-27	22	(Estonia) Oscar Bear (7)	-
2024	III liiga E	1	20	16	3	1	68	22	+46	51	(Estonia) Gren Kevin Raudsep (30)	-
2025	II liiga B S/E	2	26	21	2	3	100	41	+59	65	(Estonia) Herol Riiberg (31)	Third round
2026*	II liiga B S/E	11	19	5	3	11	29	61	-32	18	(Estonia) Herol Riiberg (7)	Third round

*ongoing

== Players ==
=== Current squad ===
As of 7 September 2026.

Note: Flags indicate national team as defined under FIFA eligibility rules; some limited exceptions apply. Players may hold more than one non-FIFA nationality.

No.	Pos.	Nation	Player
4	DF	EST	Karl Erik Välba
5	MF	EST	Marko Nahkor
6	MF	EST	Hardo Riiberg
9	FW	EST	Rene Lill
10	MF	EST	Herol Riiberg
15	DF	EST	Karl Johannes Kink
16	MF	EST	Erik Toomet
17	MF	EST	Janar Prague
18	MF	EST	Andre Ilves

No.	Pos.	Nation	Player
20	DF	EST	Reeno Soosaar
23	MF	EST	Gustav Treiberg
28	DF	EST	Kenn Kais
29	DF	EST	Henrik Maasik
44	MF	EST	Viktor Plotnikov
45	DF	EST	Timothy Step
55	GK	EST	Auris Waterland
66	FW	EST	Oscar Bear
77	DF	EST	Oliver Holm
