= FC Kuressaare U21 =

Estonian football club

- Full name: Football Club Kuressaare U21
- Nicknames: Kure; Viikingid (The Vikings)
- Founded: 2002; 23 years ago
- Ground: Kuressaare linnastaadion, Kuressaare
- Capacity: 2,000
- Chairman: Priit Penu
- Manager: Sander Viira
- League: II liiga
- 2025: Esiliiga B, 9th of 10 (relegated)

FC Kuressaare U21 is the reserve team of Estonian football club FC Kuressaare, playing in the town of Kuressaare.

== Current squad ==
As of 24 August 2013.

Note: Flags indicate national team as defined under FIFA eligibility rules; some limited exceptions apply. Players may hold more than one non-FIFA nationality.

No.	Pos.	Nation	Player
2	MF	EST	Andro Aavik
22	DF	EST	Taavi Azarov
11	MF	EST	Mait Erlenbach
12	GK	EST	Rait Hansen
8	FW	EST	Hans Hiiuväin
19	DF	EST	Theodor Kaljo
19	DF	EST	Thorwald-Eirik Kaljo
27	DF	EST	Algis Kelder
2	MF	EST	Kustas Kobin
3	DF	EST	Jaanis Kriska
25		EST	Martin Lonn
6	DF	EST	Kaarel Mai
15	FW	EST	Kristen Mere
23	FW	EST	Margus Rajaver

No.	Pos.	Nation	Player
5	DF	EST	Urmas Rajaver
11	FW	EST	Raido Reinsalu
7	MF	EST	Alari Saar
25	DF	EST	Arli Saar
13		EST	Edmond Salong
17	MF	EST	Sander Seeman
9	MF	EST	Mario Stern
25	MF	EST	Maarek Suursaar
27		EST	Sander Süld
8	MF	EST	Veiko Tasa
7	MF	EST	Danel Tiirats
—	DF	EST	Mikk Varvas
26	MF	EST	Reivo Vinter
