= 2020 Esiliiga B =

Estonian football league season for third division

Esiliiga B
- Season: 2020
- Dates: 8 March 2020 – 22 November 2020
- Champions: Paide Linnameeskond U21
- Promoted: Paide Linnameeskond U21; Welco
- Relegated: Helios; Keila; Tarvas
- Top goalscorer: Eduard Desjatski; Ander Ott Valge (24 goals)

The 2020 Esiliiga B was the eighth season of the Esiliiga B, the third tier of Estonian football. The season began on 8 March 2020 and concluded on 22 November 2020.

== Teams ==
Of the 10 participating teams 6 remained following the 2019 Esiliiga B. The 2019 champions Nõmme United, runners-up Vändra and 3rd placed Pärnu Jalgpalliklubi were promoted to the Esiliiga, while 10th placed Volta were relegated to the II liiga. The four new sides in this year's campaign are Welco, Tarvas, Läänemaa and Tallinna Kalev U21.

=== Stadiums and locations ===
Locations of the 2020 Esiliiga B teams

| Team | Location | Stadium | Capacity |
|---|---|---|---|
| Helios | Võru | Võru Sports Centre Stadium | 434 |
| Keila | Keila | Keila Stadium | |
| Läänemaa | Haapsalu | Haapsalu linnastaadion | |
| Nõmme Kalju U21 | Tallinn | Hiiu Stadium | 300 |
| Paide Linnameeskond U21 | Paide | Paide linnastaadion | 500 |
| Tabasalu | Tabasalu | Tabasalu Arena | |
| Tallinna Kalev U21 | Tallinn | Kalev Keskstaadion | |
| Tarvas | Rakvere | Rakvere linnastaadion | 1,100 |
| Viimsi | Viimsi | Viimsi Stadium | |
| Welco | Tartu | Tartu Tamme Stadium | 1,500 |

== League table ==
| Pos | Team | Pld | W | D | L | GF | GA | GD | Pts | Promotion, qualification or relegation |
|---|---|---|---|---|---|---|---|---|---|---|
| 1 | Paide Linnameeskond U21 (C, P) | 30 | 23 | 2 | 5 | 112 | 40 | +72 | 71 | Promotion to Esiliiga |
| 2 | Welco (P) | 30 | 20 | 2 | 8 | 81 | 50 | +31 | 62 | Promotion to Esiliiga |
| 3 | Tallinna Kalev U21 | 30 | 19 | 1 | 10 | 81 | 59 | +22 | 58 | |
| 4 | Tabasalu | 30 | 16 | 3 | 11 | 58 | 46 | +12 | 51 | Qualification for promotion play-offs |
| 5 | Viimsi | 28 | 12 | 5 | 11 | 60 | 44 | +16 | 41 | |
| 6 | Läänemaa | 28 | 11 | 3 | 14 | 55 | 64 | −9 | 36 | |
| 7 | Nõmme Kalju U21 | 30 | 11 | 2 | 17 | 49 | 78 | −29 | 35 | |
| 8 | Helios (R) | 30 | 10 | 5 | 15 | 55 | 68 | −13 | 35 | Qualification for relegation play-offs |
| 9 | Keila (R) | 30 | 8 | 6 | 16 | 61 | 93 | −32 | 30 | Relegation to II liiga |
| 10 | Tarvas (R) | 30 | 3 | 1 | 26 | 26 | 96 | −70 | 10 | Relegation to II liiga |

Source: Soccerway
Rules for classification: 1) Points; 2) Less matches awarded against; 3) Head-to-head points; 4) Head-to-head goal difference; 5) Matches won; 6) Goal difference; 7) Goals scored; 8) Away goals scored; 9) Fairplay ranking.
(C) Champions; (P) Promoted; (R) Relegated

== Results ==
=== Matches 1–18 ===
| Home \ Away | HEL | KEI | LÄÄ | NÕM | PLM | TAB | KAL | TAR | VII | WEL |
|---|---|---|---|---|---|---|---|---|---|---|
| Helios | | 2–3 | 3–3 | 2–5 | 5–1 | 1–4 | 0–1 | 2–1 | 1–1 | 2–4 |
| Keila | 1–2 | | 2–1 | 0–3 | 4–4 | 2–2 | 0–4 | 4–1 | 1–2 | 1–3 |
| Läänemaa | 4–1 | 7–1 | | 3–1 | 2–3 | 1–4 | 1–3 | 3–0 | 2–1 | 1–3 |
| Nõmme Kalju U21 | 1–0 | 3–5 | 2–4 | | 0–3 | 2–0 | 2–1 | 1–0 | 1–0 | 2–5 |
| Paide Linnameeskond U21 | 3–0 | 5–3 | 4–0 | 4–3 | | 2–0 | 1–2 | 8–1 | 3–1 | 0–1 |
| Tabasalu | 1–2 | 0–3 | 3–0 | 5–0 | 2–1 | | 3–2 | 2–0 | 1–2 | 1–2 |
| Tallinna Kalev U21 | 1–1 | 13–1 | 4–2 | 4–1 | 1–5 | 4–3 | | 3–1 | 2–3 | 2–1 |
| Tarvas | 5–2 | 2–4 | 0–1 | 0–4 | 0–3 | 0–3 | 0–2 | | 1–3 | 0–4 |
| Viimsi | 1–1 | 2–2 | 0–1 | 6–0 | 2–0 | 0–1 | 4–0 | 5–0 | | 1–1 |
| Welco | 2–0 | 6–1 | 1–1 | 3–1 | 1–3 | 0–1 | 2–3 | 3–0 | 5–3 | |

Source: Soccerway
Legend: Blue = home team win; Yellow = draw; Red = away team win.

=== Matches 19–30 ===
| Home \ Away | HEL | KEI | LÄÄ | NÕM | PLM | TAB | KAL | TAR | VII | WEL |
|---|---|---|---|---|---|---|---|---|---|---|
| Helios | | | | 3–0 | 1–6 | 3–4 | 0–5 | | | 0–2 |
| Keila | 1–3 | | 3–4 | | 3–6 | 0–1 | | | 0–0 | |
| Läänemaa | 2–3 | | | | | | | 1–2 | 2–0 | 1–5 |
| Nõmme Kalju U21 | | 1–3 | 0–5 | | | | 0–2 | 3–3 | | |
| Paide Linnameeskond U21 | | | 7–0 | 3–1 | | 6–0 | 7–1 | 7–0 | | 4–1 |
| Tabasalu | | | 1–1 | 5–0 | 1–1 | | 1–5 | 2–1 | 2–0 | 4–2 |
| Tallinna Kalev U21 | | 3–1 | 4–1 | | 1–3 | 1–0 | | | 1–6 | 3–6 |
| Tarvas | 0–3 | 1–6 | | | | | 2–3 | | | 0–2 |
| Viimsi | 2–5 | | | 2–4 | 1–2 | | | 4–3 | | |
| Welco | | 6–1 | | 4–1 | 2–7 | 2–1 | 1–0 | | 1–5 | |

Source: Soccerway
Legend: Blue = home team win; Yellow = draw; Red = away team win.

== Relegation play-offs ==
28 November 2020
13:00 (UTC+2)

| Tallinn | 1–0 | Helios |
|---|---|---|
| Malov 33' | Report |

Lasnamäe Sports Complex, Tallinn
Attendance: 29
Referee: Teet Allas
5 December 2020
13:00 (UTC+2)

| Helios | 0–0 | Tallinn |
|---|---|---|
| | Report |

Barrus Arena Võru, Võru
Attendance: 65
Referee: Toomas Nõmmiste

Tallinn won 1–0 on aggregate.

== Season statistics ==
=== Top scorers ===
| Rank | Player | Club | Goals |
|---|---|---|---|
| 1 | (Estonia) Eduard Desjatski | Helios | 24 |
| 1 | (Estonia) Ander Ott Valge | Paide Linnameeskond U21 | 24 |
| 3 | (Estonia) Kevor Palumets | Paide Linnameeskond U21 | 21 |
| 4 | (Estonia) Ramol Sillamaa | Tallinna Kalev U21 | 18 |
| 5 | (Estonia) Karmo Einmann | Läänemaa | 16 |
| 5 | (Estonia) Kasper Karl Epner | Keila | 16 |
| 5 | (Estonia) Jaagup Luts | Paide Linnameeskond U21 | 16 |
| 5 | (Estonia) Karl Anton Sõerde | Viimsi | 16 |
| 5 | (Estonia) Mikk Valtna | Welco | 16 |
| 10 | (Estonia) Kenlou Laasner | Tallinna Kalev U21 | 14 |
| 10 | (Estonia) Gregor Lehtmets | Viimsi | 14 |
| 10 | (Estonia) Rain Näkk | Welco | 14 |
| 10 | (Estonia) Sten Jakob Viidas | Tabasalu | 14 |

== Awards ==
=== Monthly awards ===
| Month | Manager of the Month | | Player of the Month | |
| Month | Manager | Club | Player | Club |
|---|---|---|---|---|
| May | (Estonia) Tarmo Neemelo | Nõmme Kalju U21 | (Estonia) Henri Perk | Nõmme Kalju U21 |
| June | (Estonia) Janar Sagim | Welco | (Estonia) Eduard Desjatski | Helios |
| July | (Estonia) Daniel Meijel | Tallinna Kalev U21 | (Estonia) Märten Subka | Tabasalu |
| August | (Estonia) Theimo Tülp | Läänemaa | (Estonia) Kaarel Rumberg | Tabasalu |
| September | (Estonia) Erki Kesküla | Paide Linnameeskond U21 | (Estonia) Artur Aus | Welco |
| October | (Estonia) Risto Sarapik | Tabasalu | (Estonia) Ander Ott Valge | Paide Linnameeskond U21 |

=== Esiliiga B Player of the Year ===
Kevor Palumets was named Esiliiga B Player of the Year.

== See also ==
- 2019–20 Estonian Cup
- 2020–21 Estonian Cup
- 2020 Meistriliiga
- 2020 Esiliiga
