= 2018 Esiliiga B =

Estonian football league season for third division

Esiliiga B
- Season: 2018
- Champions: Tallinna JK Legion
- Promoted: Tallinna JK Legion; Tartu JK Tammeka U21; Kohtla-Järve JK Järve
- Relegated: Lasnamäe FC Ajax; FC Flora U19
- Matches: 180
- Goals: 748 (4.16 per match)
- Top goalscorer: Rejal Alijev, 40 goals

The 2018 Esiliiga B was the 6th season of the Esiliiga B, third-highest Estonian league for association football clubs, since its establishment in 2013.

== Teams ==
Of the 10 participating teams 4 remained following the 2017 Esiliiga B. The 2017 champions Kalju U21, runners-up Kalev U21 and 4th placed Keila JK were promoted to Esiliiga, while 10th place Sillamäe Kalev U21 was relegated and Viimsi JK and Raasiku Joker decided not to participate in 2018 Esiliiga B. For this season those six teams will be replaced by 6 II Liiga teams. They are: Lasnamäe Ajax, Nõmme United, Pärnu JK, Tallinna Legion, Flora U19 and Võru Helios. Only Tallinna Legion and Flora U19 have played in Esiliiga B before.

=== Stadia ===
Locations of the 2016 Esiliiga B teams

Team	Location	Stadium	Capacity
FC Flora U19	Tallinn	Sportland Arena	540
Kohtla-Järve JK Järve	Kohtla-Järve	Kohtla-Järve SPK Stadium	780
Lasnamäe FC Ajax	Tallinn	Ajaxi staadion	
Nõmme United	Tallinn	Männiku staadion	
Paide Linnameeskond U21	Paide	Paide linnastaadion	268
Pärnu JK	Pärnu	Pärnu Raeküla staadion	500
Tallinna JK Legion	Tallinn	Wismari staadion	
Tartu Tammeka U21	Tartu	Sepa Stadium	508
Vändra JK Vaprus	Vändra	Vändra Stadium	273
Võru FC Helios	Võru	Võru Spordikeskuse staadion	

== Results ==
=== League table ===
Pos	Team	Pld	W	D	L	GF	GA	GD	Pts	Promotion, qualification or relegation
1	Tallinna Legion (C, P)	36	32	2	2	125	31	+94	98	Promotion to the Esiliiga
2	Tammeka U21 (P)	36	22	6	8	108	40	+68	72	Promotion to the Esiliiga
3	Kohtla-Järve Järve (P)	36	21	6	9	80	39	+41	69	Qualification for promotion play-offs
4	Pärnu JK	36	18	7	11	80	51	+29	61	
5	Nõmme United	36	17	9	10	100	57	+43	60	
6	Võru Helios	36	15	9	12	81	66	+15	54	
7	Vändra Vaprus	36	11	5	20	61	96	−35	38	
8	Paide U21 (Note: Paide escaped relegation due to vacant league spot after Tartu Santos from 2018 Esiliiga were relegated down two league levels.)	36	8	4	24	45	94	−49	28	
9	Lasnamäe Ajax (R)	36	4	4	28	35	135	−100	16	Qualification for relegation play-offs
10	Flora U19 (Note: Reserve teams are ineligible for promotion.) (R)	36	4	4	28	33	138	−105	16	Relegation to II Liiga

Source: soccerway (in English), Esiliiga B (in Estonian)
Rules for classification: 1) Points; 2) Less matches awarded against; 3) Head-to-head points; 4) Head-to-head goal difference; 5) Matches won; 6) Goal difference; 7) Goals scored; 8) Away goals scored; 9) Fairplay ranking.
(C) Champions; (P) Promoted; (R) Relegated

=== Results tables ===
==== First half of the season ====
Home \ Away	AJA	FLO	HEL	JÄR	LEG	NUT	PAI	PÄR	TAM	VAP
Ajax		5–0	1–1	0–4	0–6	3–5	2–3	0–3	2–2	5–2
Flora U19	3–2		1–2	1–2	2–7	3–0	1–1	1–4	1–6	0–1
Helios	0–2	8–0		2–4	0–5	2–2	2–0	2–0	4–1	3–2
Järve	0–0	1–0	3–0		0–1	2–2	4–1	0–1	1–1	5–0
Legion	4–0	5–1	3–0	4–0		5–0	3–1	3–2	2–1	2–1
Nõmme Utd	8–0	5–0	1–1	6–0	0–3		1–1	2–1	1–2	3–0
Paide U21	2–0	1–1	0–2	1–0	0–1	1–2		0–4	2–5	0–2
Pärnu JK	3–2	5–0	1–1	1–1	1–3	3–2	2–1		0–1	1–1
Tammeka U21	12–0	5–0	4–0	1–0	1–2	0–0	0–0	1–1		3–1
Vaprus	2–0	4–1	2–2	1–3	0–6	1–6	2–1	2–1	2–4	

Updated to match(es) played on July 2018. Source: Esiliiga B
Legend: Blue = home team win; Yellow = draw; Red = away team win.

==== Second half of the season ====
Home \ Away	AJA	FLO	HEL	JÄR	LEG	NUT	PAI	PÄR	TAM	VAP
Ajax		1–3	2–5	0–3	0–3	0–5	0–3	0–2	1–7	0–0
Flora U19	1–2		1–1	0–9	0–7	1–5	2–0	1–4	0–3	2–2
Helios	6–2	8–1		1–2	3–1	5–5	5–0	0–0	2–0	3–4
Järve	2–0	3–1	4–1		2–0	1–0	2–0	1–1	0–1	5–0
Legion	4–0	3–1	2–1	3–0		3–1	7–0	4–3	1–1	1–0
Nõmme Utd	6–1	8–0	0–0	2–2	2–7		6–0	3–1	1–4	1–1
Paide U21	4–1	7–0	0–2	0–3	0–4	0–2		2–1	2–6	3–4
Pärnu JK	6–0	4–0	6–2	2–4	2–2	1–0	5–4		3–2	3–1
Tammeka U21	7–0	4–1	3–1	4–0	0–2	1–2	10–0	2–0		2–1
Vaprus	8–1	3–2	1–2	0–7	4–6	1–4	0–4	1–2	4–2	

Updated to match(es) played on 11 November 2018. Source: Esiliiga B
Legend: Blue = home team win; Yellow = draw; Red = away team win.

=== Positions by round ===
Leader and promotion to 2019 Esiliiga
Qualification to promotion play-offs
Qualification to relegation play-offs
Relegation to 2019 II liiga

The table lists the positions of teams after completion of each round. In order to preserve chronological evolvements, any postponed matches are not included in the round at which they were originally scheduled, but added to the full round they were played immediately afterwards. For example, if a match is scheduled for matchday 13, but then postponed and played between days 16 and 17, it will be added to the standings for day 16.

Team ╲ Round	1	2	3	4	5	6	7	8	9	10	11	12	13	14	15	16	17	18	19	20	21	22	23	24	25	26	27	28	29	30	31	32	33	34	35	36
TJK Legion	2	1	1	1	1	1	1	1	1	1	1	1	1	1	1	1	1	1	1	1	1	1	1	1	1	1	1	1	1	1	1	1	1	1	1	1
Tammeka U21	3	2	2	2	2	2	2	2	2	2	2	2	2	2	2	2	2	2	2	2	2	2	2	2	2	2	2	2	2	2	2	2	2	2	2	2
Kohtla-Järve Järve	10	10	10	8	6	5	4	4	4	5	4	4	5	4	4	3	3	5	5	5	4	4	3	3	3	3	3	3	3	3	3	3	3	3	3	3
Pärnu JK	7	4	3	5	5	7	7	7	5	4	6	6	6	5	5	5	5	3	3	3	3	3	4	4	4	4	4	4	4	4	5	4	5	4	5	4
Nõmme United	1	5	4	4	4	3	3	3	3	3	3	3	3	3	3	4	4	4	4	4	5	5	5	5	5	5	5	5	5	5	4	5	4	5	4	5
Võru Helios	4	3	6	6	7	6	6	5	6	6	5	5	4	6	6	6	6	6	6	6	6	6	6	6	6	7	7	6	6	6	6	6	6	6	6	6
Vändra Vaprus	8	8	5	3	3	4	5	6	7	7	7	7	7	7	7	7	7	7	7	7	7	7	7	7	7	6	6	7	7	7	7	7	7	7	7	7
Flora U19	5	7	7	7	8	8	8	8	9	9	9	9	9	9	8	8	8	8	8	8	8	8	8	8	9	9	9	9	9	9	8	8	8	8	8	8
Paide U21	6	9	9	10	10	10	10	10	8	8	8	8	8	8	9	9	9	9	9	9	9	10	10	10	10	10	10	10	10	10	10	10	9	9	9	9
Lasnamäe Ajax	9	6	8	9	9	9	9	9	10	10	10	10	10	10	10	10	10	10	10	10	10	9	9	9	8	8	8	8	8	8	9	9	10	10	10	10

Source: Esiliiga B

== Season statistics ==
=== Top scorers ===
Updated on 20 July.

Rank	Player	Club	Goals
1	(Estonia) Rejal Alijev	Legion	40
2	(Estonia) Kein Makovei	Pärnu JK	27
3	(Estonia) Marek Šatov	Legion	24
4	(Estonia) Denis Vnukov	Legion	20
4	(Estonia) Pavel Fedorenko	Nõmme United	20

== Awards ==
=== Monthly awards ===
Month	Manager of the Month		Player of the Month	
Month	Manager	Club	Player	Club
March	(Estonia) Denis Belov	Legion	(Estonia) Sten Reinkort	Tammeka U21
April	(Estonia) Denis Belov	Legion	(Russia) Aleksandr Ivanyushin	Järve
May	(Estonia) Denis Belov	Legion	(Estonia) Rejal Alijev	Legion
June/July	(Estonia) Igor Prins	Pärnu	(Estonia) Denis Vnukov	Legion
August	(Estonia) Aleksandr Puštov	Järve	(Brazil) Geovane	Järve
September	(Estonia) Martin Klasen	Nõmme United	(Estonia) Sander Taan	Helios
October	(Estonia) Marti Pähn	Tammeka U21	(Estonia) Kein Makovei	Pärnu

=== Esiliiga B Player of the Year ===
Rejal Alijev was named Esiliiga B Player of the Year.

== See also ==
- 2017–18 Estonian Cup
- 2018–19 Estonian Cup
- 2018 Meistriliiga
- 2018 Esiliiga
