= 2024 Esiliiga =

Esiliiga
- Season: 2024
- Dates: 2 March 2024 – 10 November 2024
- Champions: Harju
- Promoted: Harju
- Relegated: Paide Linnameeskond U21; Tabasalu

The 2024 Esiliiga was the 34th season of the Esiliiga, the second tier of Estonian football. The season began on 2 March 2024 and concluded on 10 November 2024.

The winners (Harju) were promoted to the 2025 Meistriliiga. The runners-up (Viimsi) qualified for the Meistriliiga play-off, losing and remaining in the league. The eighth-placed team (Elva) qualified for the Esiliiga play-off, winning and retaining their place in the league. The bottom two teams (Paide Linnameeskond U21 and Tabasalu) were relegated to the 2025 Esiliiga B.

== Teams ==
The league consisted of ten teams; seven teams remaining from the previous season, two teams promoted from the Esiliiga B, and one team relegated from the Meistriliiga. The promoted teams were 2023 Esiliiga B champions Welco, and runners-up Tallinna Kalev U21 (replacing the relegated 2023 Esiliiga teams, Alliance and Legion). The relegated team was Harju (replacing the promoted 2023 Esiliiga team, Nõmme United).

=== Stadiums and locations ===
Locations of the 2024 Esiliiga teams

Team	Location	Stadium	Capacity
Elva	Elva	Elva linnastaadion	30
FCI Levadia U21	Tallinn	Maarjamäe Stadium	30
Flora U21	Tallinn	Sportland Arena	1,172
Harju	Laagri	Laagri Stadium	400
Paide Linnameeskond U21	Paide	Paide linnastaadion	500
Tabasalu	Tabasalu	Tabasalu Arena	1,630
Tallinn	Tallinn	Lasnamäe Sports Complex Stadium	200
Tallinna Kalev U21	Tallinn	Kalevi Keskstaadion artificial turf	270
Viimsi	Haabneeme	Viimsi Stadium	800
Welco	Tartu	Holm Jalgpallipark	580

=== Personnel and kits ===
Team	Manager	Captain	Kit manufacturer	Shirt sponsor
Elva	(Estonia) Kaido Koppel	(Estonia) Jürgen Kuresoo	Nike	Sportland
FCI Levadia U21	(Spain) Santi García	(Estonia) Sergei Mošnikov	Macron	Admirals, Viimsi Keevitus
Flora U21	(Estonia) Taavi Viik	(Estonia) Oskar Hendrikson	Nike	Optibet
Harju	(Portugal) Victor Silva		Adidas	
Paide Linnameeskond U21	(Serbia) Andreja Varicak		Capelli	Verston
Tabasalu	(Brazil) Alan Arruda	(Estonia) Märten Subka	Uhlsport	Eventtents, Rademar
Tallinn	(Estonia) Andrei Kalimullin	(Estonia) Albert Taar	Adidas	
Tallinna Kalev U21	(Estonia) Alo Bärengrub		Macron	Unibet
Viimsi	(Estonia) Ivo Lehtmets		Joma	Assa Abloy
Welco	(Estonia) Jaanus Reitel	(Estonia) Tauno Tekko	Adidas	Holm

== League table ==
Pos	Team	Pld	W	D	L	GF	GA	GD	Pts	Promotion, qualification or relegation
1	Harju (C, P)	36	22	12	2	110	42	+68	78	Promotion to the Meistriliiga
2	Viimsi	36	22	9	5	75	42	+33	75	Qualification for the Meistriliiga play-off
3	Flora U21	36	20	6	10	96	55	+41	66	
4	Welco	36	16	12	8	70	44	+26	60	
5	Tallinn	36	15	8	13	67	54	+13	53	
6	FCI Levadia U21	36	13	5	18	60	71	−11	44	
7	Tallinna Kalev U21	36	11	9	16	72	87	−15	42	
8	Elva (O)	36	10	11	15	47	62	−15	41	Qualification for the Esiliiga play-off
9	Paide Linnameeskond U21 (R)	36	7	4	25	47	121	−74	25	Relegation to the Esiliiga B
10	Tabasalu (R)	36	4	4	28	35	101	−66	16	Relegation to the Esiliiga B

Source: Esiliiga
Rules for classification: 1) Points; 2) Less matches awarded against; 3) Head-to-head points; 4) Head-to-head goal difference; 5) Matches won; 6) Goal difference; 7) Goals scored; 8) Away goals scored; 9) Fair-play points; 10) Draw
(C) Champions; (O) Play-off winners; (P) Promoted; (R) Relegated

== Results ==
Teams face each other four times (twice at home and twice away).

Home \ Away	ELV	FCI	FLO	HAR	PLM	TAB	TAL	TAK	VII	WEL	ELV	FCI	FLO	HAR	PLM	TAB	TAL	TAK	VII	WEL
Elva		2–3	2–2	0–0	2–2	3–1	2–3	2–2	0–2	1–0		2–0	1–3	2–1	3–1	3–1	0–1	1–1	2–3	0–1
FCI Levadia U21	3–0		1–3	1–2	3–0	5–1	0–1	3–0	2–0	2–2	0–0		2–4	4–3	2–1	2–1	2–3	0–3	1–2	1–0
Flora U21	2–0	3–1		1–1	2–0	4–0	0–4	1–3	1–3	1–1	2–0	4–1		1–3	1–2	5–0	4–0	6–1	4–1	0–1
Harju	5–0	3–2	2–0		6–0	4–3	1–1	3–3	2–2	0–0	1–0	4–0	4–1		7–0	5–1	2–1	3–3	0–0	1–1
Paide Linnameeskond U21	1–2	3–1	1–11	2–8		3–0	0–1	0–1	0–5	1–6	3–4	5–1	2–4	0–6		3–3	2–2	1–7	0–3	1–2
Tabasalu	2–2	1–1	2–0	1–4	0–1		1–2	3–3	0–3	1–3	0–3	3–2	1–4	1–3	1–3		1–0	1–3	1–2	0–4
Tallinn	4–0	3–4	2–4	1–1	8–1	4–0		3–2	0–2	1–1	3–4	1–2	1–1	0–2	3–0	3–1		2–2	0–1	1–3
Tallinna Kalev U21	4–0	1–3	1–3	1–4	3–5	0–1	1–3		2–2	0–3	2–2	3–1	1–1	2–6	3–0	4–2	0–2		3–1	4–2
Viimsi	1–1	1–1	2–4	2–2	5–0	1–0	2–2	3–1		2–4	2–1	1–0	3–2	4–4	1–0	1–0	1–0	6–0		1–1
Welco	0–0	3–2	2–2	0–2	2–1	2–0	3–0	5–2	0–1		0–0	1–1	3–5	1–4	2–2	6–0	1–1	3–0	1–3	

Source: Flashscore
Legend: Blue = home team win; Yellow = draw; Red = away team win.

== Esiliiga play-off ==
The eighth-placed club (Elva) faced the third-placed club from the 2024 Esiliiga B (Legion) in a two-legged play-off for the final place in the 2025 Esiliiga.

=== First leg ===
17 November 2024	Legion	0–3	Elva	Tallinn
10:30 BST			Jaagant 29'; Põldsaar 65' (pen.); Ivaste 89'	Stadium: Sportland Arena

=== Second leg ===
24 November 2024	Elva	6–0 (9–0 agg.)	Legion	Elva
10:30 BST				Stadium: Elva linnastaadion

== Season statistics ==
=== Top scorers ===
Rank	Player	Club	Goals
1	(Estonia) Gregor Lehtmets	Viimsi	31
2	(Estonia) Karel Eerme	Harju	28
2	(Estonia) Kenlou Laasner	Tallinna Kalev U21	28
4	(Estonia) Kristjan Kriis	Harju	25
5	(Russia) Kirill Nesterov	Tallinn	20
6	(Estonia) Aleksandr Volkov	Tallinn	19
7	(Estonia) Henri Käblik	FCI Levadia U21	18
8	(Estonia) Maksim Kalimullin	Flora U21	15
8	(Estonia) Erki Mõttus	Welco	15
10	(Estonia) Tristan Pajo	Flora U21	13

== Awards ==
=== Monthly awards ===
Month	Player of the Month		Manager of the Month	
Month	Player	Club	Manager	Club
March	(Estonia) Tristan Saupõld	Welco	(Estonia) Jaanus Reitel	Welco
April	(Estonia) Gregor Lehtmets	Viimsi	(Portugal) Victor Silva	Harju
May	(Estonia) Karel Eerme	Harju	(Estonia) Andrei Kalimullin	Tallinn
June/July	(Estonia) Henri Käblik	FCI Levadia U21	(Estonia) Jaanus Reitel	Welco
August	(Estonia) Gregor Lehtmets	Viimsi	(Estonia) Ivo Lehtmets	Viimsi
September	(Estonia) Ander Sikk	Harju	(Estonia) Andris Altsaar	Flora U21
October	(Ukraine) Danyil Rudenko	Harju	(Portugal) Victor Silva	Harju

=== Annual awards ===
The Esiliiga Player of the Year was awarded to Gregor Lehtmets.
