= 2021 Esiliiga B =

Estonian football league season for third division

Esiliiga B
- Season: 2021
- Dates: 6 March 2021 – 21 November 2021
- Champions: Viimsi
- Promoted: Viimsi; Harju; Alliance
- Relegated: Vändra
- Matches played: 156
- Goals scored: 663 (4.25 per match)
- Top goalscorer: Karl Anton Sõerde (30 goals)
- Biggest home win: Viimsi 7–0 Läänemaa (23 May 2021); Harju 7–0 Läänemaa (30 June 2021)
- Biggest away win: Tallinn 0–7 Tallinna Kalev U21 (26 September 2021); Legion U21 0–7 Tallinn (16 October 2021)
- Highest scoring: Alliance 6–3 Tallinna Kalev U21 (31 May 2021); Nõmme Kalju U21 4–5 Läänemaa (31 May 2021)

The 2021 Esiliiga B was the ninth season of the Esiliiga B, the third tier of Estonian football. The season began on 6 March 2021 and concluded on 21 November 2021. Viimsi won their first Esiliiga B title.

== Teams ==
=== Stadiums and locations ===
Locations of the 2021 Esiliiga B teams

| Team | Location | Stadium | Capacity |
|---|---|---|---|
| Alliance | Kohtla-Järve | Kohtla-Järve Sports Centre Stadium | 150 |
| Harju | Laagri | Laagri Stadium | 40 |
| Läänemaa | Haapsalu | Haapsalu linnastaadion | 1,080 |
| Legion U21 | Tallinn | Wismar Football Stadium | N/A |
| Nõmme Kalju U21 | Tallinn | Hiiu Stadium | 300 |
| Tabasalu | Tabasalu | Tabasalu Arena | 1,630 |
| Tallinn | Tallinn | Lasnamäe Sports Complex Stadium | 88 |
| Tallinna Kalev U21 | Tallinn | Kalev Keskstaadion artificial turf | 270 |
| Vändra | Vändra | Vändra Stadium | 273 |
| Viimsi | Haabneeme | Viimsi Stadium | 800 |

== League table ==
| Pos | Team | Pld | W | D | L | GF | GA | GD | Pts | Qualification or relegation |
|---|---|---|---|---|---|---|---|---|---|---|
| 1 | Viimsi (C, P) | 32 | 19 | 7 | 6 | 81 | 30 | +51 | 64 | Promotion to Esiliiga |
| 2 | Harju (P) | 32 | 20 | 3 | 9 | 88 | 49 | +39 | 63 | Promotion to Esiliiga |
| 3 | Alliance (O, P) | 32 | 17 | 2 | 13 | 63 | 70 | −7 | 53 | Qualification for promotion play-offs |
| 4 | Tallinn | 32 | 16 | 2 | 14 | 68 | 66 | +2 | 50 | |
| 5 | Tallinna Kalev U21 | 32 | 14 | 4 | 14 | 71 | 68 | +3 | 46 | |
| 6 | Tabasalu | 32 | 12 | 5 | 15 | 60 | 64 | −4 | 41 | |
| 7 | Legion U21 | 30 | 12 | 1 | 17 | 64 | 83 | −19 | 37 | |
| 8 | Läänemaa | 30 | 10 | 3 | 17 | 65 | 94 | −29 | 33 | |
| 9 | Nõmme Kalju U21 | 30 | 10 | 3 | 17 | 56 | 66 | −10 | 33 | Reprieved from relegation (Note: Nõmme Kalju U21 avoided relegation due to Pärnu Jalgpalliklubi maintaining their spot in the Esiliiga.) |
| 10 | Vändra (R) | 30 | 9 | 4 | 17 | 47 | 73 | −26 | 31 | Relegation to II liiga |

Source: Esiliiga B
Rules for classification: 1) Points; 2) Less matches awarded against; 3) Head-to-head points; 4) Head-to-head goal difference; 5) Matches won; 6) Goal difference; 7) Goals scored; 8) Away goals scored; 9) Fair-play points; 10) Draw
(C) Champions; (O) Play-off winners; (P) Promoted; (R) Relegated

== Results ==
=== Matches 1–18 ===
| Home \ Away | ALL | HAR | LÄÄ | LEG | NÕM | TAB | TAL | KAL | VÄN | VII |
|---|---|---|---|---|---|---|---|---|---|---|
| Alliance | | 1–3 | 3–2 | 1–0 | 2–1 | 1–4 | 0–3 | 6–3 | 3–2 | 1–2 |
| Harju | 4–1 | | 7–0 | 2–6 | 5–2 | 1–1 | 3–1 | 1–0 | 5–1 | 0–1 |
| Läänemaa | 2–3 | 1–4 | | 6–2 | 0–5 | 2–2 | 5–3 | 3–5 | 6–1 | 4–3 |
| Legion U21 | 3–1 | 5–3 | 6–2 | | 5–1 | 4–1 | 3–2 | 0–2 | 1–2 | 2–3 |
| Nõmme Kalju U21 | 1–2 | 2–1 | 4–5 | 3–1 | | 1–3 | 2–4 | 2–1 | 1–3 | 1–5 |
| Tabasalu | 2–2 | 3–2 | 6–0 | 4–2 | 1–1 | | 0–1 | 1–0 | 0–2 | 2–5 |
| Tallinn | 3–0 | 2–1 | 3–2 | 4–2 | 2–1 | 1–4 | | 1–2 | 2–0 | 0–3 |
| Tallinna Kalev U21 | 4–1 | 1–2 | 0–4 | 6–2 | 0–5 | 5–2 | 1–0 | | 1–2 | 2–2 |
| Vändra | 1–1 | 2–3 | 4–1 | 1–4 | 2–4 | 3–1 | 3–4 | 1–1 | | 2–6 |
| Viimsi | 3–0 | 1–2 | 7–0 | 4–0 | 1–1 | 3–0 | 2–0 | 6–0 | 5–0 | |

Source: Estonian Football Association (in Estonian)
Legend: Blue = home team win; Yellow = draw; Red = away team win.

=== Matches 19–32 ===
| Home \ Away | ALL | HAR | LÄÄ | LEG | NÕM | TAB | TAL | KAL | VÄN | VII |
|---|---|---|---|---|---|---|---|---|---|---|
| Alliance | | 3–2 | | 1–5 | 3–1 | 3–1 | 1–3 | 2–1 | 2–3 | 1–0 |
| Harju | 1–3 | | 3–2 | 4–2 | | 2–0 | 7–1 | 4–0 | | 3–2 |
| Läänemaa | 1–3 | | | | | 1–3 | 0–5 | | 1–0 | 1–1 |
| Legion U21 | | | 3–2 | | 3–1 | | 0–7 | 1–6 | | |
| Nõmme Kalju U21 | | 1–2 | 1–2 | | | 2–0 | 1–6 | | | |
| Tabasalu | 3–5 | 0–3 | | 4–0 | | | 0–3 | 4–1 | 3–0 | 0–3 |
| Tallinn | 1–3 | 1–1 | | | | 1–2 | | 0–7 | | 1–1 |
| Tallinna Kalev U21 | 5–3 | 0–5 | 4–1 | | 1–2 | 1–1 | 4–2 | | 5–2 | 0–0 |
| Vändra | | 1–0 | | 0–1 | 1–5 | | 0–1 | | | |
| Viimsi | 0–1 | 2–2 | | 1–0 | 1–0 | 3–2 | 5–0 | 0–2 | 0–0 | |

Source: Estonian Football Association (in Estonian)
Legend: Blue = home team win; Yellow = draw; Red = away team win.

== Season statistics ==
=== Top scorers ===
| Rank | Player | Club | Goals |
|---|---|---|---|
| 1 | (Estonia) Karl Anton Sõerde | Viimsi | 30 |
| 2 | (Estonia) Andre Järva | Harju | 27 |
| 3 | (Estonia) Juhan Jograf Siim | Läänemaa | 22 |
| 4 | (Estonia) Mihhail Orlov | Läänemaa | 19 |
| 5 | (Estonia) Daniel Fedotov | Legion U21 | 18 |
| 5 | (Estonia) Viktor Plotnikov | Tallinn | 18 |
| 7 | (Estonia) Martin Salf | Läänemaa | 17 |
| 8 | (Estonia) Karel Eerme | Harju | 16 |
| 8 | (Morocco) Selim El Aabchi | Tallinna Kalev U21 | 16 |
| 8 | (Estonia) Tristan Pajo | Tabasalu | 16 |
| 8 | (Estonia) Rainer Peips | Vändra | 16 |

== Awards ==
=== Monthly awards ===
| Month | Manager of the Month | | Player of the Month | |
| Month | Manager | Club | Player | Club |
|---|---|---|---|---|
| May | (Estonia) Ivo Lehtmets | Viimsi | (Estonia) Andre Järva | Harju |
| June/July | (Estonia) Erik Šteinberg | Alliance | (Estonia) Karl Anton Sõerde | Viimsi |
| September | (Estonia) Andrei Kalimullin | Tallinn | (Estonia) Tristan Pajo | Tabasalu |
| October | (Portugal) Victor Silva | Harju | (Estonia) Mihhail Orlov | Alliance |

=== Player of the Season ===
Karl Anton Sõerde was named Esiliiga B Player of the Year.
