= 2024 Esiliiga B =

Estonian football league season for third division

Esiliiga B
- Season: 2024
- Dates: 2 March – 10 November 2024
- Champions: Tammeka U21
- Promoted: Nõmme Kalju U21; Tammeka U21
- Relegated: Pärnu Jalgpalliklubi; Tulevik

The 2024 Esiliiga B was the twelfth season of the Esiliiga B, the third tier of Estonian football. The season started on 2 March and finished on 10 November 2024.

== Teams ==
The league consisted of ten teams; eight teams remaining from the previous season, one team promoted from the II liiga, and one team relegated from the Esiliiga.

Despite losing the 2023 Esiliiga B play-off, Phoenix were promoted from the 2023 II liiga after Alliance (bottom-placed team of the 2023 Esiliiga) folded. Legion were relegated from the 2023 Esiliiga, replacing Tallinna Kalev U21 and Welco (top two teams of the 2023 Esiliiga B).

=== Stadiums and locations ===
Locations of the 2024 Esiliiga B teams

| Team | Location | Stadium | Capacity |
|---|---|---|---|
| Kuressaare U21 | Kuressaare | Kuressaare linnastaadion | 1,000 |
| Tallinna JK Legion | Tallinn | Sportland Arena | 1,198 |
| Läänemaa | Haapsalu | Haapsalu linnastaadion | 1,080 |
| Narva Trans U21 | Narva | Narva Kalev-Fama Stadium | 1,000 |
| Nõmme Kalju U21 | Tallinn | Hiiu Stadium | 570 |
| Jõhvi FC Phoenix | Jõhvi | Heino Lipp Stadium | 794 |
| Pärnu Jalgpalliklubi | Pärnu | Pärnu Rannastaadion | 1,501 |
| Tammeka U21 | Tartu | Sepa Jalgpallikeskus | 504 |
| Tartu Kalev | Ülenurme | Ülenurme Stadium | 312 |
| Tulevik | Viljandi | Viljandi linnastaadion | 1,068 |

== League table ==
| Pos | Team | Pld | W | D | L | GF | GA | GD | Pts | Promotion, qualification or relegation |
|---|---|---|---|---|---|---|---|---|---|---|
| 1 | Tammeka U21 (C, P) | 36 | 22 | 8 | 6 | 91 | 44 | +47 | 74 | Promotion to the Esiliiga |
| 2 | Nõmme Kalju U21 (P) | 36 | 21 | 3 | 12 | 104 | 61 | +43 | 66 | Promotion to the Esiliiga |
| 3 | Legion | 36 | 18 | 4 | 14 | 64 | 49 | +15 | 58 | Qualification for the Esiliiga play-off |
| 4 | Kuressaare U21 | 36 | 17 | 4 | 15 | 66 | 70 | −4 | 55 | |
| 5 | Tartu Kalev | 36 | 16 | 7 | 13 | 60 | 64 | −4 | 55 | |
| 6 | Narva Trans U21 | 36 | 15 | 9 | 12 | 57 | 51 | +6 | 54 | |
| 7 | Phoenix | 36 | 12 | 9 | 15 | 78 | 81 | −3 | 45 | |
| 8 | Läänemaa (O) | 36 | 12 | 6 | 18 | 62 | 86 | −24 | 42 | Qualification for the Esiliiga B play-off |
| 9 | Tulevik (R) | 36 | 9 | 5 | 22 | 49 | 77 | −28 | 32 | Relegation to the II liiga |
| 10 | Pärnu Jalgpalliklubi (R) | 36 | 8 | 5 | 23 | 46 | 94 | −48 | 29 | Relegation to the II liiga |

Source: Esiliiga B
Rules for classification: 1) Points; 2) Less matches awarded against; 3) Head-to-head points; 4) Head-to-head goal difference; 5) Matches won; 6) Goal difference; 7) Goals scored; 8) Away goals scored; 9) Fair-play points; 10) Draw
(C) Champions; (O) Play-off winners; (P) Promoted; (R) Relegated

== Esiliiga B play-off ==
The two runners-up from the 2024 II liiga (Puuma Tallinn and Vaprus II) contested the semi-finals over two legs, with the winners facing the eighth-placed Esiliiga B team (Läänemaa) in another two-legged play-off for the final place in the 2025 Esiliiga B.

=== Semi-final ===
==== First leg ====
| 10 November 2024 | Vaprus II | 4–1 | Puuma Tallinn | Pärnu |
| 11:00 BST | | | | Stadium: Pärnu Rannastaadion |

==== Second leg ====
| 13 November 2024 | Puuma Tallinn | 3–2 (4–6 agg.) | Vaprus II | Tallinn |
| 17:30 BST | | | | Stadium: Nike Arena |

=== Final ===
==== First leg ====
| 17 November 2024 | Vaprus II | 2–2 | Läänemaa | Pärnu |
| 10:30 BST | Dolgov 36'; Kolvart 50' | | Saarnak 53'; Veski 65' | Stadium: Pärnu Rannastaadion |

==== Second leg ====
| 24 November 2024 | Läänemaa | 4–2 (6–4 agg.) | Vaprus II | Haapsalu |
| 10:30 BST | | | | Stadium: Haapsalu linnastaadion |

== Season statistics ==
=== Top scorers ===
| Rank | Player | Club | Goals |
|---|---|---|---|
| 1 | (Georgia (country)) Akaki Gvineria | Tammeka U21 | 24 |
| 2 | (Estonia) Jelissei Zahharov | Phoenix | 21 |
| 2 | (Estonia) Kris Edvard Kohv | Tartu Kalev | 21 |
| 4 | (Estonia) Nikita Ivanov | Nõmme Kalju U21 | 19 |
| 5 | (Estonia) Andreas Tiits | Läänemaa | 18 |
| 6 | (Moldova) Bogdan Stoyanov | Phoenix | 17 |
| 7 | (Estonia) Robin Mathias Müür | Tammeka U21 | 15 |
| 7 | (Estonia) Kaimar Saag | Tulevik | 15 |
| 9 | (Estonia) Igor Subbotin | Nõmme Kalju U21 | 12 |
| 10 | (Estonia) Andre Balta | Legion | 11 |
| 10 | (Brazil) Lucas Serravalle | Nõmme Kalju U21 | 11 |

== Awards ==
=== Monthly awards ===
| Month | Player of the Month | | Manager of the Month | |
| Month | Player | Club | Manager | Club |
|---|---|---|---|---|
| March | (Georgia (country)) Akaki Gvineria | Tammeka U21 | (Estonia) Sander Viira | Kuressaare U21 |
| April | (Estonia) Kris Edvard Kohv | Tartu Kalev | (Estonia) Kalmer Kaasik | Tartu Kalev |
| May | (Georgia (country)) Akaki Gvineria | Tammeka U21 | (Estonia) Karl Gustav Kärner | Tammeka U21 |
| June/July | (Brazil) Lucas Serravalle | Nõmme Kalju U21 | (Estonia) Sander Viira | Kuressaare U21 |
| August | (Estonia) Jelissei Zahharov | Phoenix | (Estonia) Erik Šteinberg | Nõmme Kalju U21 |
| September | (Moldova) Bogdan Stoyanov | Phoenix | (Estonia) Rait Oja | Tulevik |
| October | (Moldova) Bogdan Stoyanov | Phoenix | (Estonia) Maksim Gruznov | Narva Trans U21 |

=== Annual awards ===
The Esiliiga B Player of the Year was awarded to Akaki Gvineria.
