= 2019 Esiliiga B =

Estonian football league season for third division

Esiliiga B
- Season: 2019
- Dates: 9 March 2019 – 10 November 2019
- Champions: Nõmme United
- Promoted: Nõmme United; Vändra; Pärnu Jalgpalliklubi
- Relegated: Volta
- Matches: 180
- Goals: 757 (4.21 per match)
- Top goalscorer: Martin Pärn (37 goals)
- Biggest home win: Pärnu Jalgpalliklubi 12–1 Volta (20 October 2019)
- Biggest away win: Volta 0–14 Nõmme United (3 November 2019)
- Highest scoring: Volta 0–14 Nõmme United (3 November 2019)

The 2019 Esiliiga B was the seventh season of the Esiliiga B, the third tier of Estonian football.

== Teams ==
Of the 10 participating teams five remained following the 2018 Esiliiga B. The 2018 champions Legion, runners-up Tammeka U21 and third placed Järve were promoted to Esiliiga, while ninth and 10th placed Ajax and Flora U19 were relegated to II liiga. They are replaced by Viimsi, who returned after a one-year absence, Volta and Tabasalu, who made their debut in the Esiliiga B. The teams relegated from 2018 Esiliiga were Nõmme Kalju U21 and Keila.

=== Stadiums and locations ===
Locations of the 2019 Esiliiga B teams

Team	Location	Stadium	Capacity
Helios	Võru	Võru Sports Centre Stadium	434
Keila	Keila	Keila Stadium	20
Nõmme Kalju U21	Tallinn	Hiiu Stadium	300
Nõmme United	Tallinn	Männiku Stadium	50
Paide Linnameeskond U21	Paide	Paide linnastaadion	500
Pärnu Jalgpalliklubi	Pärnu	Pärnu Rannastaadion	1,501
Tabasalu	Tabasalu	Tabasalu Arena	1,630
Vändra	Vändra	Vändra Stadium	273
Viimsi	Haabneeme	Viimsi Stadium	800
Volta	Tallinn	Sõle Stadium	485

== Results ==
=== League table ===
Pos	Team	Pld	W	D	L	GF	GA	GD	Pts	Promotion, qualification or relegation
1	Nõmme United (C, P)	36	27	4	5	118	38	+80	85	Promotion to the Esiliiga
2	Vändra (P)	36	21	5	10	97	71	+26	68	Promotion to the Esiliiga
3	Pärnu Jalgpalliklubi (O, P)	36	19	5	12	82	53	+29	62	Qualification for promotion play-offs
4	Nõmme Kalju U21	36	19	4	13	79	50	+29	61	
5	Viimsi	36	16	4	16	75	68	+7	52	
6	Keila	36	14	4	18	67	87	−20	46	
7	Tabasalu	36	13	4	19	77	79	−2	43	
8	Paide Linnameeskond U21	36	11	6	19	61	87	−26	39	
9	Helios	36	10	4	22	48	101	−53	34	
10	Volta (R)	36	9	2	25	53	123	−70	29	Relegation to the II liiga

Source: Soccerway (in English), Esiliiga B (in Estonian)
Rules for classification: 1) Points; 2) Less matches awarded against; 3) Head-to-head points; 4) Head-to-head goal difference; 5) Matches won; 6) Goal difference; 7) Goals scored; 8) Away goals scored; 9) Fairplay ranking.
(C) Champions; (O) Play-off winners; (P) Promoted; (R) Relegated

== Results tables ==
=== Matches 1–18 ===
Home \ Away	HEL	KEI	KAL	NÕM	PLM	PÄR	TAB	VÄN	VII	VOL
Helios		2–2	1–4	1–3	1–0	3–2	4–8	0–1	1–0	1–6
Keila	0–2		1–2	3–1	2–2	1–4	2–1	2–4	2–3	2–1
Nõmme Kalju U21	0–1	0–0		0–1	3–0	0–1	3–1	1–0	4–1	3–2
Nõmme United	4–0	3–2	1–3		5–1	1–1	3–1	2–1	3–4	4–0
Paide Linnameeskond U21	2–4	1–4	0–5	0–6		1–1	0–6	5–3	2–2	0–3
Pärnu Jalgpalliklubi	0–1	6–0	3–1	1–2	0–2		2–2	1–2	2–1	2–1
Tabasalu	3–1	1–4	0–5	2–3	2–1	1–2		1–3	1–2	5–0
Vändra	4–1	5–0	1–3	2–3	3–3	3–2	4–1		3–3	2–1
Viimsi	1–0	2–1	3–3	1–2	0–1	3–1	2–1	9–0		5–0
Volta	0–1	3–4	2–1	0–2	0–1	2–3	3–1	2–3	3–1	

Source: Esiliiga B
Legend: Blue = home team win; Yellow = draw; Red = away team win.

=== Matches 19–36 ===
Home \ Away	HEL	KEI	KAL	NÕM	PLM	PÄR	TAB	VÄN	VII	VOL
Helios		0–3	0–3	0–6	2–3	1–3	0–3	0–3	1–3	1–1
Keila	4–2		3–1	0–6	0–2	1–0	1–1	1–4	2–3	7–1
Nõmme Kalju U21	2–3	0–1		0–3	3–4	2–1	1–2	10–0	1–1	3–2
Nõmme United	2–2	6–1	1–2		2–1	4–2	6–1	1–1	4–1	5–0
Paide Linnameeskond U21	7–3	2–4	2–4	1–1		3–1	2–0	1–1	1–3	1–2
Pärnu Jalgpalliklubi	0–0	4–2	2–1	1–4	3–0		3–1	4–2	4–2	12–1
Tabasalu	6–2	1–2	1–2	0–2	4–1	1–1		2–2	4–2	4–0
Vändra	6–1	5–2	3–0	2–0	2–1	1–3	4–1		3–1	9–0
Viimsi	1–3	3–0	2–3	0–2	2–0	0–1	1–3	2–1		4–3
Volta	5–2	3–1	0–0	0–14	0–7	0–3	3–4	1–4	2–1	

Source: Esiliiga B
Legend: Blue = home team win; Yellow = draw; Red = away team win.

== Season statistics ==
=== Top scorers ===
Rank	Player	Club	Goals
1	(Estonia) Martin Pärn	Vändra	37
2	(Estonia) Oliver Jürgens	Nõmme United	28
3	(Estonia) Robi Saarma	Nõmme United	26
4	(Estonia) Kein Makovei	Pärnu Jalgpalliklubi	24
5	(Estonia) Ken-Marten Tammeveski	Viimsi	20
6	(Estonia) Geir-Kristjan Suurpere	Viimsi	17
7	(Estonia) Jevgeni Demidov	Nõmme Kalju U21	15
7	(Estonia) Taavi Laurits	Volta	15
9	(Estonia) Martin Aasmäe	Viimsi	13
9	(Estonia) Ralf Friedemann	Keila	13
9	(Estonia) Kevin Mätas	Nõmme United	13

== Awards ==
=== Monthly awards ===
Month	Manager of the Month		Player of the Month	
Month	Manager	Club	Player	Club
March	(Estonia) Martin Klasen	Nõmme United	(Estonia) Martin Pärn	Vändra
April	(Estonia) Ivo Lehtmets	Viimsi	(Estonia) Oliver Jürgens	Nõmme United
May	(Estonia) Kristen Viikmäe	Nõmme Kalju U21	(Estonia) Taavi Laurits	Volta
June	(Estonia) Igor Prins	Pärnu Jalgpalliklubi	(Estonia) Oliver Jürgens	Nõmme United
July	(Estonia) Ranet Lepik	Vändra	(Estonia) Mart-Mattis Niinepuu	Keila
August	(Estonia) Igor Prins	Pärnu Jalgpalliklubi	(Estonia) Jevgeni Demidov	Nõmme Kalju U21
September	(Estonia) Ranet Lepik	Vändra	(Estonia) Robi Saarma	Nõmme United
October	(Estonia) Martin Klasen	Nõmme United	(Estonia) Martin Pärn	Vändra

=== Esiliiga B Player of the Year ===
Martin Pärn was named Esiliiga B Player of the Year.

== See also ==
- 2018–19 Estonian Cup
- 2019–20 Estonian Cup
- 2019 Meistriliiga
- 2019 Esiliiga
