= 2017 Esiliiga B =

Estonian football league season for third division

Esiliiga B
- Season: 2017
- Champions: Kalju U21
- Promoted: Kalju U21; Kalev U21; Keila
- Relegated: Sillamäe U21
- Matches: 180
- Goals: 618 (3.43 per match)
- Top goalscorer: Karl Anton Sõerde (29 goals)
- Biggest home win: Vändra Vaprus 8–2 Joker (29 October 2017)
- Biggest away win: Sillamäe U21 0–8 Keila (27 August 2017)
- Highest scoring: Vändra Vaprus 8–2 Joker (29 October 2017)
- Longest winning run: 7 matches Kalev U21
- Longest unbeaten run: 11 matches Vändra Vaprus
- Longest winless run: 8 matches Järve
- Longest losing run: 6 matches Sillamäe U21; Tammeka U21

The 2017 Esiliiga B was the 5th season of the Esiliiga B, third-highest Estonian league for association football clubs, since its establishment in 2013. The season began on 1 March 2017.

== Teams ==
Of the 10 participating teams 5 remain following the 2016 Esiliiga B. The 2016 champions Kuressaare and runners-up Elva were promoted to Esiliiga, while 9th place Flora U19 and 10th place Tulevik II were relegated. For this season those five teams will be replaced by the Esiliiga relegated Vändra Vaprus, Kohtla-Järve JK Järve and Nõmme Kalju U21 and II Liiga promoted Keila and Paide Linnameeskond U21. The 3rd placed Welco managed to earn a promotion, winning the promotion play-off, while 8th placed Viimsi remained in the league by winning the relegation play-off.

=== Stadia ===
Locations of the 2016 Esiliiga B teams

Team	Location	Stadium	Capacity
Järve	Kohtla-Järve	Kohtla-Järve SPK Stadium	780
Joker	Raasiku	Raasiku Stadium	200
Keila	Keila	Keila Stadium	500
Nõmme Kalju U21	Tallinn	Hiiu Stadium	650
Paide Linnameeskond U21	Paide	Paide linnastaadion	268
Sillamäe Kalev U21	Sillamäe	Sillamäe Kalev artificial turf	300
Tallinna Kalev U21	Tallinn	Kalev Keskstaadion artificial turf	270
Tammeka U21	Tartu	Sepa Stadium	508
Vaprus	Vändra	Vändra Stadium	273
Viimsi	Haabneeme	Viimsi KK Stadium	800

=== Personnel and kits ===
Team	Manager	Captain	Kit manufacturer	Shirt sponsor
Järve	(Russia) Aleksandr Pushtov		Adidas	Euronics
Joker	(Estonia) Andre Ilves	(Estonia) Rene Lill	Joma	Unibox
Keila	(Estonia) Tiit Tikenberg	(Estonia) Kaspar Kaldoja	Adidas	Hole In One
Nõmme Kalju U21	(Estonia) Erko Saviauk		Adidas	help.ee
Paide Linnameeskond U21	(Estonia) Paul Kask	(Estonia) Rico Reinoja	Nike	Enemat
Sillamäe Kalev U21	(Ukraine) Vadym Dobizha		Uhlsport	Alexela
Tallinna Kalev U21	(Estonia) Daniel Meijel		Nike	
Tammeka U21	(Estonia) Marti Pähn		Nike	Goldtime
Vaprus	(Estonia) Ranet Lepik	(Estonia) Toomas Eier	Macron	
Viimsi	(Estonia) Ivo Lehtmets		Joma	

=== Managerial changes ===
Team	Outgoing manager	Manner of departure	Date of vacancy	Position in table	Incoming manager	Date of appointment
Järve	(Russia) Aleksei Tikhomirov	Mutual consent	6 November 2016	Pre-season	(Ukraine) Roman Kozhukhovskyi	21 November 2016
Nõmme Kalju U21	(Estonia) Zaur Tšilingarašvili	Mutual consent	25 November 2016	Pre-season	(Estonia) Erko Saviauk	25 November 2016
Tammeka U21	(Estonia) Timo Teniste	Mutual consent	7 December 2016	Pre-season	(Estonia) Marti Pähn	7 December 2016
Paide Linnameeskond U21	(Estonia) Rauno Kald	Mutual consent	16 December 2016	Pre-season	(Estonia) Paul Kask	16 December 2016
Viimsi	(Estonia) Urmas Kirs	Signed by Tarvas	31 December 2016	Pre-season	(Estonia) Ivo Lehtmets	1 January 2017
Järve	(Ukraine) Roman Kozhukhovskyi	Mutual consent	23 July 2017	4th	(Estonia) Andrei Škaleta	23 July 2016
Järve	(Estonia) Andrei Škaleta	End of caretaker spell	11 August 2017	5th	(Russia) Aleksandr Pushtov	11 August 2017

== Results ==
=== League table ===
Pos	Team	Pld	W	D	L	GF	GA	GD	Pts	Promotion, qualification or relegation
1	Kalju U21 (C, P)	36	20	8	8	72	43	+29	68	Promotion to the Esiliiga
2	Kalev U21 (Note: Reserve teams are ineligible for promotion.) (P)	36	19	7	10	71	40	+31	64	Promotion to the Esiliiga
3	Vändra	36	19	5	12	75	67	+8	62	Qualification for the promotion play-offs
4	Keila (P)	36	18	6	12	75	55	+20	60	Got promoted, because other teams didn't want to get promoted.
5	Järve	36	15	6	15	55	48	+7	51	
6	Tammeka U21	36	14	7	15	69	73	−4	49	
7	Viimsi (R)	36	14	6	16	55	63	−8	48	Decided to play in II Liiga the following year.
8	Joker (R)	36	13	7	16	58	72	−14	46	Decided to play in II Liiga the following year.
9	Paide U21	36	9	7	20	50	79	−29	34	Stayed in Esiliiga B, because other teams were relegated.
10	Sillamäe Kalev U21 (R)	36	8	3	25	38	85	−47	27	Dissolved

Updated to match(es) played on 5 November 2017. Source: soccerway (in English), Esiliiga B (in Estonian)
Rules for classification: 1) Points; 2) Play-off (only if deciding champion); 3) Less matches awarded against; 4) Matches won; 5) Head-to-head points; 6) Head-to-head goal difference; 7) Goal difference; 8) Goals scored; 9) Away goals scored; 10) Fairplay ranking.
(C) Champions; (P) Promoted; (R) Relegated

=== Results tables ===
==== First half of the season ====
Home \ Away	JOK	JÄR	KAL	KEI	NÕM	PAI	SIL	TAM	VAP	VII
Joker		1–2	4–0	4–1	1–1	1–0	1–2	6–1	1–2	2–0
Järve	1–0		0–0	3–0	3–1	1–2	3–0	1–1	1–0	2–0
Tallinna Kalev U21	0–1	1–0		0–0	1–2	4–0	3–2	2–1	0–4	1–1
Keila	5–2	1–0	0–0		3–1	2–1	2–0	3–2	3–0	3–0
Nõmme Kalju U21	0–1	0–0	4–2	3–2		1–1	3–0	1–0	4–2	3–1
Paide U21	3–1	0–0	1–1	0–3	1–1		3–1	0–6	3–1	1–2
Sillamäe Kalev U21	2–3	0–3	0–1	0–4	0–5	0–5		4–1	2–1	4–0
Tammeka U21	6–0	1–2	2–1	1–1	0–0	4–2	4–0		2–3	0–1
Vaprus	4–2	3–2	5–3	2–4	1–1	3–0	3–0	3–1		2–1
Viimsi	2–3	3–0	1–1	1–2	0–2	4–1	3–0	0–1	1–0	

Updated to match(es) played on 4 September 2017. Source: Esiliiga B
Legend: Blue = home team win; Yellow = draw; Red = away team win.

==== Second half of the season ====
Home \ Away	JOK	JÄR	KAL	KEI	NÕM	PAI	SIL	TAM	VAP	VII
Joker		2–1	0–1	1–1	1–0	4–0	0–4	3–0	0–2	2–5
Järve	5–0		0–2	1–3	2–0	4–1	1–2	1–4	3–3	4–0
Tallinna Kalev U21	5–1	3–0		4–0	3–0	1–2	3–0	4–2	0–0	3–1
Keila	2–2	4–1	0–2		0–1	4–1	3–1	1–3	1–3	2–3
Nõmme Kalju U21	2–1	4–2	2–1	4–0		4–1	2–1	5–1	4–1	2–0
Paide U21	1–1	3–1	0–3	1–2	4–0		2–3	1–1	1–2	2–3
Sillamäe Kalev U21	1–1	1–1	0–1	0–8	3–3	0–2		1–2	1–2	1–3
Tammeka U21	1–1	2–0	0–4	4–1	0–4	4–0	3–0		1–1	3–0
Vaprus	8–2	0–3	1–8	2–1	2–2	3–1	0–2	3–1		3–1
Viimsi	2–2	0–1	3–2	2–2	1–1	3–3	+ : -	3–3	4–0	

Updated to match(es) played on 5 November 2017. Source: Esiliiga B
Legend: Blue = home team win; Yellow = draw; Red = away team win.

== Season statistics ==
=== Top scorers ===
As of matches played on 5 November 2017

Rank	Player	Club	Goals
1	(Estonia) Karl Anton Sõerde	Kalev U21	29
2	(Estonia) Markko Kudu	Raasiku FC Joker	20
2	(Estonia) Juhan Jograf Siim	Kalev U21/Tammeka U21	20
4	(Estonia) Henry Rohtla	Keila JK	17
4	(Estonia) Jevgeni Demidov	Kalju U21	17
6	(Estonia) Oliver Suur	Keila JK	16
7	(Estonia) Kaarel Saaremets	Vaprus	12
8	(Estonia) German Narnitski	Järve	11
8	(Estonia) Martin Pärn	Vaprus	11
10	(Estonia) Aleksei Tihhonov	Järve	10

=== Attendance ===
Club	Attendance home	Avg. attendance home	Attendance away	Avg. attendance away	Attendance overall	Avg. attendance overall
Keila	1692	94	1019	57	2711	75
Vaprus	1437	80	1045	58	2482	69
Joker	1443	80	968	54	2411	67
Järve	1180	66	1017	57	2197	61
Kalju U21	1010	56	1165	65	2175	60
Sillamäe U21	1006	56	1133	63	2139	59
Viimsi	971	54	1096	61	2067	57
Kalev U21	788	44	1243	69	2031	56
Tammeka U21	853	47	1109	62	1962	55
Paide U21	596	33	1181	66	1777	49

== Awards ==
=== Monthly awards ===
Month	Manager of the Month		Player of the Month	
Month	Manager	Club	Player	Club
March	(Ukraine) Roman Kozhukhovskyi	Järve	(Estonia) Oliver Suur	Keila
April	(Estonia) Tiit Tikenberg	Keila	(Estonia) Markko Kudu	Joker
May	(Estonia) Ranet Lepik	Vaprus	(Estonia) Vladislav Zanfirov	Nõmme Kalju U21
June	(Estonia) Andre Ilves	Joker	(Estonia) Kaarel Saaremets	Vaprus
July	(Estonia) Daniel Meijel	Tallinna Kalev U21	(Estonia) Toomas Mangusson	Vaprus
August	(Estonia) Ranet Lepik	Vaprus	(Estonia) Jevgeni Demidov	Nõmme Kalju U21
September	(Estonia) Daniel Meijel	Tallinna Kalev U21	(Estonia) Karl Anton Sõerde	Tallinna Kalev U21
October	(Estonia) Marti Pähn	Tammeka U21	(Estonia) Mart Paul Preiman	Tammeka U21

=== Esiliiga B Player of the Year ===
Karl Anton Sõerde was named Esiliiga B Player of the Year.

== See also ==
- 2016–17 Estonian Cup
- 2017–18 Estonian Cup
- 2017 Meistriliiga
- 2017 Esiliiga
