= 2025 Esiliiga B =

Estonian football league season for third division

Esiliiga B
- Season: 2025
- Dates: 28 February – 9 November 2025
- Champions: Maardu Linnameeskond (2nd title)
- Promoted: Maardu Linnameeskond; Nõmme United U21
- Relegated: Kuressaare U21; Läänemaa; Paide Linnameeskond U21
- Matches: 174
- Goals: 714 (4.1 per match)
- Top goalscorer: Aleksandr Volkov (34 goals)

The 2025 Esiliiga B was the thirteenth season of the Esiliiga B, the third tier of Estonian football. The season started on 28 February and finished on 9 November 2025.

== Teams ==
The league consisted of ten teams; six teams remaining from the previous season, two teams promoted from the II liiga, and two teams relegated from the Esiliiga.

The promoted teams were the 2024 II liiga North/East champions Maardu Linnameeskond and South/West champions Nõmme United U21 (replacing the 2024 Esiliiga B bottom two teams Pärnu Jalgpalliklubi and Tulevik).

The relegated teams were the 2024 Esiliiga bottom two teams Paide Linnameeskond U21 and Tabasalu (replacing the 2024 Esiliiga B champions Tammeka U21 and runners-up Nõmme Kalju U21).

=== Stadiums and locations ===
Locations of the 2025 Esiliiga B teams

Team	Location	Stadium	Capacity
Kuressaare U21	Kuressaare	Kuressaare linnastaadion	1,000
Legion	Tallinn	Sportland Arena	1,198
Läänemaa	Haapsalu	Haapsalu linnastaadion	1,080
Maardu Linnameeskond	Maardu	Maardu Stadium	1,000
Narva Trans U21	Narva	Narva Kalev-Fama Stadium	1,000
Nõmme United U21	Tallinn	Männiku Stadium	500
Paide Linnameeskond U21	Paide	Paide linnastaadion	500
Phoenix	Jõhvi	Heino Lipp Stadium	794
Tabasalu	Tabasalu	Tabasalu Arena	1,630
Tartu Kalev	Ülenurme	Ülenurme Stadium	312

== League table ==
Pos	Team	Pld	W	D	L	GF	GA	GD	Pts	Promotion, qualification or relegation
1	Maardu Linnameeskond (C, P)	36	28	5	3	116	39	+77	89	Promotion to the 2026 Esiliiga
2	Nõmme United U21 (P)	36	23	3	10	93	53	+40	72	Promotion to the 2026 Esiliiga
3	Phoenix	36	21	5	10	95	61	+34	68	Qualification for the Esiliiga play-off
4	Narva Trans U21	36	21	3	12	87	53	+34	66	
5	Tartu Kalev	36	19	4	13	81	53	+28	61	
6	Tabasalu	36	13	8	15	60	67	−7	47	
7	Legion	36	13	6	17	69	94	−25	45	
8	Paide Linnameeskond U21 (R)	36	11	8	17	65	71	−6	41	Qualification for the Esiliiga B play-off
9	Kuressaare U21 (R)	36	5	2	29	40	108	−68	17	Relegation to the 2026 II liiga
10	Läänemaa (R)	36	3	2	31	33	140	−107	11	Relegation to the 2026 II liiga

Source: Esiliiga B
Rules for classification: 1) Points; 2) Less matches awarded against; 3) Head-to-head points; 4) Head-to-head goal difference; 5) Matches won; 6) Goal difference; 7) Goals scored; 8) Away goals scored; 9) Fair-play points; 10) Draw
(C) Champions; (P) Promoted; (R) Relegated

== Results ==
Teams face each other four times (twice at home and twice away).

Home \ Away	KUR	LEG	LÄÄ	MLM	NAR	NÕM	PLM	PHO	TAB	TAR	KUR	LEG	LÄÄ	MLM	NAR	NÕM	PLM	PHO	TAB	TAR
Kuressaare U21		3–4	2–4	0–3	1–4	1–4	0–2	1–4	3–2	0–3		1–6	1–0	1–2	0–3	1–4	0–3	2–3	0–5	0–4
Legion	2–0		2–2	3–5	0–4	2–2	2–2	1–1	2–2	1–0	3–3		5–4	1–3	0–4	1–3	3–2	2–3	0–3	0–1
Läänemaa	1–3	1–3		0–6	0–2	1–5	1–3	1–4	1–2	0–1	4–2	0–4		0–3	1–5	1–5	1–3	0–3	2–4	0–7
Maardu Linnameeskond	1–0	2–3	0–1		5–1	2–0	3–0	1–0	3–2	6–1	6–2	6–0	7–0		11–1	3–2	2–1	2–0	2–2	2–2
Narva Trans U21	2–0	2–0	6–0	1–0		3–0	3–0	3–4	1–0	0–1	4–1	5–1	5–0	1–2		0–2	1–2	4–2	2–1	6–1
Nõmme United U21	3–2	1–2	2–0	1–3	1–0		3–2	3–2	5–2	3–0	0–3	5–1	4–2	3–3	3–1		2–0	3–1	6–0	0–2
Paide Linnameeskond U21	4–0	2–4	3–0	1–4	3–4	0–6		2–3	3–2	2–3	1–1	7–2	6–1	2–2	1–1	1–1		2–0	0–2	1–1
Phoenix	5–1	3–0	3–1	3–5	3–3	5–2	3–1		2–2	1–0	4–0	6–1	8–1	0–2	1–0	3–2	3–3		3–1	1–3
Tabasalu	2–1	1–0	1–1	1–2	2–1	2–0	1–0	1–3		2–1	0–2	1–4	4–0	3–3	1–0	0–1	0–0	2–2		3–9
Tartu Kalev	3–1	0–1	6–1	0–1	2–3	1–2	5–0	2–0	1–0		3–1	4–3	10–0	0–3	1–1	0–4	1–0	1–3	1–1	

Source: Esiliiga B
Legend: Blue = home team win; Yellow = draw; Red = away team win.

== Esiliiga B play-off ==
The eighth-placed team (Paide Linnameeskond U21) faced the third-placed team of the 2025 II liiga A (Tulevik) in a two-legged play-off for the final place in the 2026 Esiliiga B.

=== First leg ===
15 November 2025	Tulevik	5–1	Paide Linnameeskond U21	Viljandi
18:30 BST	Vidder 11'; Saag 23'; Domberg 50'; Kiik 72' (o.g.); Toimetaja 88'		Lehtmaa 12'	Stadium: Viljandi linnastaadion

=== Second leg ===
22 November 2025	Paide Linnameeskond U21	3–2 (4–7 agg.)	Tulevik	Paide
11:00 BST	Lehtmaa 11', 66'; Tumasevski 72'		Saag 86'; Metsmaa 90+5'	Stadium: Paide linnastaadion

== Season statistics ==
=== Top scorers ===
Rank	Player	Club	Goals
1	(Estonia) Aleksandr Volkov	Maardu Linnameeskond	34
2	(Estonia) Artjom Jakovenko	Legion	32
3	(Estonia) Deniss Drabinko	Läänemaa / Maardu Linnameeskond	19
3	(Estonia) Jelissei Zahharov	Phoenix	19
5	(Estonia) Art Albert Anepaio	Tabasalu	16
5	(Estonia) Henri Lehtmaa	Paide Linnameeskond U21	16
7	(Estonia) Robert Mihhalevski	Tartu Kalev	15
8	(Estonia) Nikita Baljabkin	Narva Trans U21	13
8	(Ivory Coast) Manucho	Maardu Linnameeskond	13
8	(Estonia) German-Guri Tsvibelberg	Phoenix	13

== Awards ==
=== Monthly awards ===
Month	Player of the Month		Manager of the Month	
Month	Player	Club	Manager	Club
March	(Estonia) Patrick Bahval	Narva Trans U21	(Estonia) Maksim Gruznov	Narva Trans U21
April	(Estonia) Erik Utgof	Maardu Linnameeskond	(Estonia) Deniss Kovtun	Maardu Linnameeskond
May	(Estonia) Sander Salei	Tabasalu	(Estonia) Indrek Zelinski	Tabasalu
June	(Ivory Coast) Manucho	Maardu Linnameeskond	(Estonia) Deniss Kovtun	Maardu Linnameeskond
July	(Estonia) Artjom Jakovenko	Legion	(Estonia) Deniss Kovtun	Maardu Linnameeskond
August	(Estonia) Jelissei Zahharov	Phoenix	(Moldova) Vladimir Aga	Phoenix
September	(Estonia) Art Albert Anepaio	Tabasalu	(Estonia) Indrek Zelinski	Tabasalu
October	(Estonia) Renat Samulin	Tartu Kalev	(Estonia) Risto Sarapik	Nõmme United U21

=== Annual awards ===
The Esiliiga B Player of the Year was awarded to Aleksandr Volkov.
