= 2026 Esiliiga =

Esiliiga
- Season: 2026
- Dates: 5 March – 8 November 2026
- Champions: Welco
- Promoted: Welco
- Relegated: Nõmme Kalju U21; Maardu Linnameeskond (withdrawn)
- Matches: 172
- Goals: 621 (3.61 per match)
- Top goalscorer: Kenlou Laasner (35 goals)
- Biggest home win: Viimsi 10–0 Nõmme Kalju U21 (8 November 2026)
- Biggest away win: Maardu Linnameeskond 1–8 Welco (13 July 2026); Tallinn 0–7 Welco (15 October 2026)
- Highest scoring: Viimsi 10–0 Nõmme Kalju U21 (8 November 2026)
- Longest winning run: 7 matches Welco
- Longest unbeaten run: 9 matches Welco; Viimsi; FCI Levadia U21
- Longest winless run: 10 matches Nõmme Kalju U21
- Longest losing run: 6 matches Nõmme Kalju U21

The 2026 Esiliiga was the 36th season of the Esiliiga. The season began on 5 March 2026 and concluded on 8 November 2026.

== Teams ==
The league consisted of ten teams; seven teams remaining from the previous season, two teams promoted from the Esiliiga B, and one team relegated from the Meistriliiga.

The promoted teams were the 2025 Esiliiga B champions Maardu Linnameeskond and runners-up Nõmme United U21. They replaced the 2025 Esiliiga bottom two teams Tallinna Kalev U21 and Tammeka U21.

The relegated team was the 2025 Meistriliiga bottom-placed team Tallinna Kalev. They replaced the 2025 Esiliiga champions Nõmme United.

=== Stadiums and locations ===
Locations of the 2026 Esiliiga teams

Team	Location	Stadium	Capacity
Elva	Otepää	Tehvandi Stadium	3,144
FCI Levadia U21	Tallinn	Maarjamäe Stadium	30
Flora U21	Tallinn	Lilleküla Training Ground I	150
Maardu Linnameeskond	Maardu	Maardu Linnastaadion	500
Nõmme Kalju U21	Tallinn	Hiiu Stadium	570
Nõmme United U21	Tallinn	Männiku Stadium	500
Tallinn	Tallinn	Lasnamäe Sports Complex Stadium	200
Tallinna Kalev	Tallinn	Sportland Arena	1,172
Viimsi	Haabneeme	Viimsi Stadium	1,006
Welco	Tartu	Holm Park	580

=== Personnel and kits ===
Team	Manager	Captain	Kit manufacturer	Shirt sponsor
Elva	(Estonia) Kaido Koppel	(Estonia) Jasper Reilson	Nike	Unibet, Sportland
FCI Levadia U21	(Estonia) Sergei Mošnikov	(Estonia) Pavel Dõmov	Macron	Viimsi Keevitus
Flora U21	(Estonia) Ats Sillaste	(Estonia) Joosep Palts	Nike	
Maardu Linnameeskond	(Estonia) Deniss Kovtun	(Estonia) Aleksandr Kulinitš	Givova	None
Nõmme Kalju U21	(Ukraine) Bogdan Lukashenko	(Estonia) Johannes Lillemets	Adidas	None
Nõmme United U21	(Estonia) Eero Maling	(Estonia) Romet Leppik	Adidas	TonyBet
Tallinn	(Estonia) Andrei Kalimullin	(Estonia) Vladimir Avilov	Adidas	None
Tallinna Kalev	(Estonia) Randin Rande	(Estonia) Vadim Mihhailov	Macron	None
Viimsi	(Estonia) Andres Oper (Estonia) Arli Salm	(Estonia) Karl Erich Kaljuvere	Joma	Assa Abloy, Penosil
Welco	(Estonia) Alo Bärengrub	(Estonia) Taijo Teniste	Adidas	Holm Bank

=== Managerial changes ===
Team	Outgoing manager	Manner of departure	Date of vacancy	Position in the table	Incoming manager	Date of appointment
Welco	(Estonia) Jaanus Reitel	Mutual consent	9 November 2025	Pre-season	(Estonia) Alo Bärengrub	22 December 2025
FCI Levadia U21	(Spain) Santi García	End of contract	4 December 2025	Pre-season	(Estonia) Dmitri Kruglov	11 December 2025
Viimsi	(Estonia) Ivo Lehtmets	Resigned	5 December 2025	Pre-season	(Estonia) Andres Oper (Estonia) Arli Salm	8 December 2025
Flora U21	(Estonia) Taavi Viik	Signed by Vaprus	19 December 2025	Pre-season	(Estonia) Ats Sillaste	2 January 2026
Tallinna Kalev	(Estonia) Alo Bärengrub	Signed by Welco	22 December 2025	Pre-season	(Serbia) Ivan Stojković	22 December 2025
Nõmme United U21	(Estonia) Risto Sarapik	Resigned	14 January 2026	Pre-season	(Estonia) Eero Maling	16 January 2026
Tallinna Kalev	(Serbia) Ivan Stojković	Resigned	26 April 2026	6th	(Estonia) Randin Rande	26 April 2026
FCI Levadia U21	(Estonia) Dmitri Kruglov	Contract terminated	2 June 2026	10th	(Estonia) Sergei Mošnikov	2 June 2026
Nõmme Kalju U21	(Estonia) Erik Šteinberg	Appointed first team assistant	10 August 2026	10th	(Ukraine) Bogdan Lukashenko	10 August 2026

== League table ==
Pos	Team	Pld	W	D	L	GF	GA	GD	Pts	Promotion, qualification or relegation
1	Welco (C, P)	36	25	5	6	101	45	+56	80	Promotion to the Meistriliiga
2	Viimsi (Q)	36	19	6	11	72	35	+37	63	Qualification for the Meistriliiga play-off
3	FCI Levadia U21 (Note: Ineligible for promotion as a league below senior team FCI Levadia)	36	19	3	14	71	59	+12	60	
4	Elva	36	16	9	11	52	52	0	57	
5	Flora U21 (Note: Ineligible for promotion as a league below senior team Flora)	36	16	7	13	78	62	+16	55	
6	Tallinna Kalev	36	12	8	16	59	64	−5	44	
7	Nõmme United U21 (Note: Ineligible for promotion as a league below senior team Nõmme United)	36	12	6	18	59	73	−14	42	
8	Tallinn (Q)	36	11	8	17	45	78	−33	41	Qualification for the Esiliiga play-off
9	Nõmme Kalju U21 (Note: Ineligible for promotion as a league below senior team Nõmme Kalju) (R)	36	7	5	24	40	95	−55	26	Relegation to the Esiliiga B
10	Maardu Linnameeskond	36	12	5	19	45	59	−14	41	Club withdrawn

Source: Esiliiga
Rules for classification: 1) Points; 2) Less matches awarded against; 3) Head-to-head points; 4) Head-to-head goal difference; 5) Matches won; 6) Goal difference; 7) Goals scored; 8) Away goals scored; 9) Fair-play points; 10) Draw
(C) Champions; (P) Promoted; (Q) Qualified for the phase indicated; (R) Relegated

=== Results ===
Home \ Away	ELV	FCI	FLO	MLM	NÕK	NÕM	TAL	TLK	VII	WEL
Elva		3–2	0–3	4–3	2–4	1–3	2–0	3–1	1–0	0–2
Elva		3–3	0–0	1–0	1–0	2–1	1–1	0–0	0–1	2–1
FCI Levadia U21	1–3		1–3	1–2	2–0	0–1	4–0	3–2	1–2	1–3
FCI Levadia U21	2–2		6–2	null (Note: FCI Levadia U21 awarded win due to Maardu Linnameeskond withdrawing from league.)	1–0	4–2	2–1	3–2	2–0	0–0
Flora U21	3–2	0–4		5–0	3–1	2–2	5–0	3–1	0–4	1–6
Flora U21	1–2	0–2		1–3	3–0	3–2	1–2	5–0	2–1	1–2
Maardu Linnameeskond	0–3	3–2	3–2		2–1	2–1	1–1	1–1	1–0	0–1
Maardu Linnameeskond	null (Note: Elva awarded win due to Maardu Linnameeskond withdrawing from league.)	4–2	null (Note: Flora U21 awarded win due to Maardu Linnameeskond withdrawing from league.)		null (Note: Nõmme Kalju U21 awarded win due to Maardu Linnameeskond withdrawing from league.)	2–1	1–0	null (Note: Tallinna Kalev awarded win due to Maardu Linnameeskond withdrawing from league.)	1–2	1–8
Nõmme Kalju U21	2–2	1–0	0–5	3–2		4–1	1–3	0–4	0–0	1–5
Nõmme Kalju U21	0–0	0–2	1–5	1–4		2–3	1–2	0–3	1–1	2–4
Nõmme United U21	1–0	1–2	3–3	4–1	0–3		2–2	1–2	0–3	1–3
Nõmme United U21	0–1	0–1	1–1	null (Note: Nõmme United U21 awarded win due to Maardu Linnameeskond withdrawing from league.)	2–0		3–1	2–1	1–0	2–1
Tallinn	1–1	4–2	1–3	0–0	6–3	4–3		1–1	0–2	0–2
Tallinn	0–3	1–5	1–0	null (Note: Tallinn awarded win due to Maardu Linnameeskond withdrawing from league.)	0–2	1–1		1–0	0–3	0–7
Tallinna Kalev	2–1	1–2	1–4	3–3	5–1	4–4	5–1		0–3	2–0
Tallinna Kalev	1–0	1–2	2–2	1–3	3–1	3–1	1–1		1–2	1–1
Viimsi	1–3	5–0	2–1	1–1	2–2	1–3	5–1	2–0		2–0
Viimsi	5–0	0–2	1–1	null (Note: Viimsi awarded win due to Maardu Linnameeskond withdrawing from league.)	10–0	4–1	1–2	1–2		0–2
Welco	3–3	3–2	3–3	5–1	4–2	5–2	4–0	3–0	2–2	
Welco	4–0	4–2	2–1	null (Note: Welco awarded win due to Maardu Linnameeskond withdrawing from league.)	3–0	4–3	0–2	3–2	1–3	

Source: Esiliiga
Legend: Blue = home team win; Yellow = draw; Red = away team win.

== Esiliiga play-off ==
The eighth-placed team (Tallinn) will face the fifth-placed team of the 2026 Esiliiga B (Tulevik) in a two-legged play-off for the final place in the 2027 Esiliiga (Esiliiga B spot passed down from third-placed team after champions Narva Trans U21 and runners-up FCI Levadia U19 ineligible for promotion).

=== First leg ===
22 November 2026	Tulevik	2–1	Tallinn	Viljandi
16:00 BST	Vidder 10'; Levit 29'		Irha 58'	Stadium: Viljandi linnastaadion

=== Second leg ===
28 November 2026	Tallinn	v	Tulevik	Tallinn
10:30 BST				Stadium: Lasnamäe Spordikompleksi kunstmurustaadion

== Season statistics ==
=== Top scorers ===
Rank	Player	Club	Goals
1	(Estonia) Kenlou Laasner	Welco	35
2	(Latvia) Dinārs Ekharts	Tallinn	27
3	(Estonia) Marten Kukkonen	Flora U21	15
4	(Estonia) Raiko Ilves	Tallinna Kalev	14
4	(Estonia) Aleksandr Volkov	Maardu Linnameeskond	14
6	(Senegal) Moussa Sambe	FCI Levadia U21	13
7	(Estonia) Artjom Jakovenko	Flora U21	12
8	(Ivory Coast) Manucho	Maardu Linnameeskond	10
8	(Estonia) Gregor Lehtmets	FCI Levadia U21	10
8	(Estonia) Karl-Tristan Lorenz	Flora U21	10
8	(United States) John-Paul Mbuthia	Elva	10
8	(Estonia) Mark William Mugra	Welco	10

== Awards ==
=== Monthly awards ===
Month	Player of the Month		Manager of the Month	
Month	Player	Club	Manager	Club
March	(Estonia) Kenlou Laasner	Welco	(Estonia) Alo Bärengrub	Welco
April	(Estonia) Marten Kukkonen	Flora U21	(Estonia) Ats Sillaste	Flora U21
May	(Senegal) Moussa Sambe	FCI Levadia U21	(Estonia) Andres Oper (Estonia) Arli Salm	Viimsi
June/July	(Estonia) Kenlou Laasner	Welco	(Estonia) Sergei Mošnikov	FCI Levadia U21
August	(Latvia) Dinārs Ekharts	Viimsi		
September	(Estonia) Marcus Agarmaa	Welco	(Estonia) Kaido Koppel	Elva
October	(Estonia) Kenlou Laasner	Welco	(Estonia) Alo Bärengrub	Welco

== See also ==
- 2026 Meistriliiga
- 2026 Esiliiga B
- 2025–26 Estonian Cup
- 2026–27 Estonian Cup
