= 2022 Esiliiga B =

Estonian football league season for third division

Esiliiga B
- Season: 2022
- Dates: 3 March 2022 – 13 November 2022
- Champions: Tallinn
- Promoted: Tallinn; Tabasalu
- Relegated: Raplamaa
- Matches: 180
- Goals: 714 (3.97 per match)
- Top goalscorer: Maksim Kalimullin (33 goals)
- Biggest home win: Tallinna Kalev U21 9–0 Raplamaa (6 November 2022)
- Biggest away win: Legion U21 1–8 Tallinn (22 August 2022)
- Highest scoring: Tabasalu 9–1 Tartu Kalev (16 July 2022); Nõmme Kalju U21 3–7 Tabasalu (30 October 2022)
- Longest winning run: 7 matches Tabasalu
- Longest unbeaten run: 27 matches Tallinn
- Longest winless run: 13 matches Raplamaa
- Longest losing run: 11 matches Raplamaa

The 2022 Esiliiga B was the tenth season of the Esiliiga B, the third tier of Estonian football. The season began on 3 March 2022 and concluded on 13 November 2022.

== Teams ==
=== Stadiums and locations ===
Locations of the 2022 Esiliiga B teams

Team	Location	Stadium	Capacity
Läänemaa	Haapsalu	Haapsalu linnastaadion	1,080
Legion U21	Tallinn	Wismari Stadium	N/A
Nõmme Kalju U21	Tallinn	Hiiu Stadium	300
Raplamaa	Rapla	Rapla Kesklinna Kooli staadion	N/A
Tabasalu	Tabasalu	Tabasalu Arena	1,630
Tallinn	Tallinn	Lasnamäe Sports Complex Stadium	200
Tallinna Kalev U21	Tallinn	Kalevi Keskstaadion artificial turf	270
Tammeka U21	Tartu	Sepa Jalgpallikeskus	504
Tartu Kalev	Ülenurme	Ülenurme Stadium	312
Welco	Tartu	Holm Park	580

=== Personnel and kits ===
Team	Manager	Captain	Kit manufacturer	Shirt sponsor
Läänemaa	(Estonia) Theimo Tülp	(Estonia) Martin Salf	Joma	Cipax Eesti
Legion U21	(Russia) Mikhail Artyukhov	(Estonia) Denis Ruus	Uhlsport	
Nõmme Kalju U21	(Estonia) Alger Dzumadil	(Estonia) Kevin Kongi	Adidas	Rämmar
Raplamaa	(Estonia) Alo Bärengrub	(Estonia) Martin Tilk	Hummel	
Tabasalu	(Estonia) Risto Sarapik	(Estonia) Valeri Makarov	Uhlsport	Eventtents, Rademar
Tallinn	(Estonia) Andrei Kalimullin	(Estonia) Albert Taar	Adidas	
Tallinna Kalev U21	(Estonia) Ats Purje	(Estonia) Kenlou Laasner	Macron	Coolbet
Tammeka U21	(Estonia) Siim Valtna	(Estonia) Marcus Agarmaa	Nike	
Tartu Kalev	(Estonia) Kalmer Kaasik	(Estonia) Kristofer Kaasik	Nike	Mileedi
Welco	(Estonia) Jaanus Reitel	(Estonia) Mikk Valtna	Adidas	Holm

== League table ==
Pos	Team	Pld	W	D	L	GF	GA	GD	Pts	Qualification or relegation
1	Tallinn (C, P)	36	24	9	3	117	38	+79	81	Promotion to Esiliiga
2	Tabasalu (P)	36	25	4	7	120	50	+70	79	Promotion to Esiliiga
3	Tallinna Kalev U21	36	20	8	8	88	48	+40	68	Qualification for promotion play-offs
4	Welco	36	17	10	9	68	47	+21	61	
5	Tammeka U21	36	16	8	12	70	59	+11	56	
6	Legion U21 (O)	36	13	3	20	60	86	−26	42	Qualification for relegation play-offs
7	Tartu Kalev	36	11	7	18	55	81	−26	40	
8	Läänemaa	36	10	7	19	49	84	−35	37	
9	Nõmme Kalju U21	36	11	3	22	54	100	−46	36	Reprieved from relegation
10	Raplamaa (R)	36	2	3	31	33	121	−88	9	Relegation to II liiga

Source: Esiliiga B
Rules for classification: 1) Points; 2) Less matches awarded against; 3) Head-to-head points; 4) Head-to-head goal difference; 5) Matches won; 6) Goal difference; 7) Goals scored; 8) Away goals scored; 9) Fair-play points; 10) Draw
(C) Champions; (O) Play-off winners; (P) Promoted; (R) Relegated

== Results ==
=== Matches 1–18 ===
Home \ Away	LÄÄ	LEG	NÕM	RAP	TAB	TAL	KAL	TAM	TAR	WEL
Läänemaa	—	3–0	3–2	3–2	1–3	1–2	0–2	0–3	2–2	2–2
Legion U21	1–2	—	1–0	4–1	1–6	1–6	0–2	2–2	4–2	0–2
Nõmme Kalju U21	5–1	0–3	—	3–2	2–1	1–5	1–1	0–1	2–1	0–2
Raplamaa	1–0	1–1	1–4	—	0–2	0–4	1–5	1–3	3–5	2–2
Tabasalu	5–0	3–1	5–1	1–1	—	0–0	4–0	5–1	5–2	4–1
Tallinn	2–0	5–2	1–2	2–0	5–2	—	3–1	1–3	2–2	4–1
Tallinna Kalev U21	4–0	3–2	2–0	4–0	1–5	2–1	—	6–0	2–1	1–2
Tammeka U21	1–1	3–1	8–0	2–1	1–2	0–0	3–1	—	3–0	1–0
Tartu Kalev	0–0	4–1	2–1	2–0	2–4	0–3	2–2	2–1	—	1–1
Welco	3–0	5–1	2–1	1–0	4–0	2–2	1–1	2–0	0–2	—

Source: Estonian Football Association (in Estonian)
Legend: Blue = home team win; Yellow = draw; Red = away team win.

=== Matches 19–36 ===
Home \ Away	LÄÄ	LEG	NÕM	RAP	TAB	TAL	KAL	TAM	TAR	WEL
Läänemaa	—	0–1	1–1	5–1	1–0	2–2	0–4	3–2	2–3	0–1
Legion U21	5–1	—	4–2	4–0	0–3	1–8	1–2	3–2	3–0	0–3
Nõmme Kalju U21	1–6	0–1	—	2–1	3–7	1–6	1–2	1–3	3–1	1–4
Raplamaa	0–5	4–5	1–2	—	1–5	0–6	0–2	2–3	3–1	0–3
Tabasalu	7–0	4–3	6–0	7–1	—	1–3	3–0	2–1	9–1	1–1
Tallinn	7–0	3–1	5–1	6–2	2–1	—	2–2	3–0	3–0	3–1
Tallinna Kalev U21	2–0	0–2	5–2	9–0	2–3	2–2	—	4–1	7–1	2–2
Tammeka U21	1–1	1–1	1–1	4–0	5–1	2–2	1–1	—	2–4	2–1
Tartu Kalev	5–0	3–0	2–6	1–0	0–1	0–0	0–3	1–2	—	0–3
Welco	1–3	0–2	5–1	3–0	2–2	1–6	1–1	3–1	0–0	—

Source: Estonian Football Association (in Estonian)
Legend: Blue = home team win; Yellow = draw; Red = away team win.

== Relegation play-offs ==
16 November 2022
20:00 (UTC+2)

Flora U19	0–3	Legion U21
	Report	Kulikov 4'; Ruus 47' (pen.); Touru 64'

Sportland Arena, Tallinn
Attendance: 43
Referee: Paul Kask
20 November 2022
12:00 (UTC+2)

Legion U21	2–1	Flora U19
Pochekutov 50', 90+1'	Report	Eiert 49'

Wismari Stadium, Tallinn
Attendance: 34
Referee: Roman Daniljuk

Legion U21 won 5–1 on aggregate.

== Season statistics ==
=== Top scorers ===
Rank	Player	Club	Goals
1	(Estonia) Maksim Kalimullin	Tallinn	33
2	(Estonia) Tristan Pajo	Tabasalu	30
3	(Estonia) Kenlou Laasner	Tallinna Kalev U21	23
4	(Estonia) Priit Peedo	Tartu Kalev	21
5	(Estonia) Viktor Plotnikov	Tallinn	20
6	(Estonia) Martin Salf	Läänemaa	19
7	(Estonia) Kevin Burov	Tammeka U21	17
8	(Russia) Kirill Nesterov	Tallinn	16
9	(Estonia) Alan Nahk	Tabasalu	15
10	(Latvia) Dinārs Ekharts	Tabasalu	14

==== Hat-tricks ====
Player	For	Against	Result	Date
(Estonia) Maksim Kalimullin	Tallinn	Legion U21	5–2 (H)	3 March 2022
(Latvia) Dinārs Ekharts	Tabasalu	Tartu Kalev	5–2 (H)	19 March 2022
(Latvia) Dinārs Ekharts	Tabasalu	Legion U21	6–1 (A)	3 April 2022
(Estonia) Tristan Pajo	Tabasalu	Welco	4–1 (H)	14 May 2022
(Estonia) Kevin Burov^{4}	Tammeka U21	Nõmme Kalju U21	8–0 (H)	22 May 2022
(Russia) Kirill Nesterov	Tallinn	Legion U21	6–1 (A)	22 May 2022
(Estonia) Kevin Burov^{4}	Tammeka U21	Läänemaa	3–0 (A)	18 June 2022
(Estonia) Viktor Plotnikov	Tallinn	Tabasalu	5–2 (H)	18 June 2022
(Estonia) Tristan Pajo	Tabasalu	Nõmme Kalju U21	6–0 (H)	4 July 2022
(Estonia) Alan Nahk	Tabasalu	Tartu Kalev	9–1 (H)	16 July 2022
(Estonia) Priit Peedo	Tartu Kalev	Tammeka U21	4–2 (A)	6 August 2022
(Estonia) Markus Õispuu	Tallinna Kalev U21	Nõmme Kalju U21	5–2 (H)	6 August 2022
(Estonia) Martin Salf^{4}	Läänemaa	Raplamaa	5–1 (H)	20 August 2022
(Estonia) Maksim Kalimullin	Tallinn	Legion U21	8–1 (A)	22 August 2022
(Estonia) Martin Salf^{4}	Läänemaa	Nõmme Kalju U21	6–1 (A)	27 August 2022
(Estonia) Tristan Pajo	Tabasalu	Raplamaa	5–1 (A)	4 September 2022
(Estonia) Denis Ruus	Legion U21	Raplamaa	4–0 (H)	10 September 2022
(Estonia) Maksim Kalimullin	Tallinn	Raplamaa	6–0 (A)	17 September 2022
(Estonia) Tristan Pajo	Tabasalu	Läänemaa	7–0 (H)	1 October 2022
(Estonia) Peeter Klein	Tabasalu	Raplamaa	7–1 (H)	22 October 2022
(Estonia) Maksim Kalimullin^{4}	Tallinn	Läänemaa	7–0 (H)	23 October 2022
(Estonia) Peeter Klein	Tabasalu	Nõmme Kalju	7–3 (A)	30 October 2022
(Estonia) Hannes Planken	Tallinna Kalev U21	Läänemaa	7–1 (H)	30 October 2022
(Estonia) Priit Peedo	Tartu Kalev	Läänemaa	3–2 (A)	13 November 2022

Notes

^{4} Player scored 4 goals
(H) – Home team
(A) – Away team

== Awards ==
=== Monthly awards ===
Month	Manager of the Month		Player of the Month	
Month	Manager	Club	Player	Club
March	(Estonia) Ats Purje	Tallinna Kalev U21	(Estonia) Kenlou Laasner	Tallinna Kalev U21
April	(Estonia) Jaanus Reitel	Welco	(Estonia) Mark William Mugra	Welco
May	(Estonia) Risto Sarapik	Tabasalu	(Estonia) Tristan Pajo	Tabasalu
June/July	(Estonia) Andrei Kalimullin	Tallinn	(Estonia) Priit Peedo	Tartu Kalev
August	(Estonia) Andrei Kalimullin	Tallinn	(Estonia) Maksim Kalimullin	Tallinn
September	(Russia) Mikhail Artyukhov	Legion U21	(Estonia) Martin Salf	Läänemaa
October	(Estonia) Risto Sarapik	Tabasalu	(Estonia) Tihhon Šišov	Tallinn

=== Esiliiga B Player of the Season ===
Tristan Pajo was named Esiliiga B Player of the Year.
