= 2023 Esiliiga B =

Estonian football league season for third division

Esiliiga B
- Season: 2023
- Dates: 5 March 2023 – 12 November 2023
- Champions: Welco
- Promoted: Welco; Tallinna Kalev U21

The 2023 Esiliiga B was the eleventh season of the Esiliiga B, the third tier of Estonian football. The season began on 5 March 2023 and concluded on 12 November 2023.

== Teams ==
=== Stadiums and locations ===
Locations of the 2023 Esiliiga B teams

Team	Location	Stadium	Capacity
Kuressaare U21	Kuressaare	Kuressaare linnastaadion	1,000
Läänemaa	Haapsalu	Haapsalu linnastaadion	1,080
Narva Trans U21	Narva	Narva Kalev-Fama Stadium	1,000
Nõmme Kalju U21	Tallinn	Hiiu Stadium	570
Pärnu Jalgpalliklubi	Pärnu	Pärnu Rannastaadion	1,501
Tallinna Kalev U21	Tallinn	Kalevi Keskstaadion artificial turf	270
Tammeka U21	Tartu	Tartu Sepa Football Centre	504
Tartu Kalev	Ülenurme	Ülenurme Stadium	312
Tulevik	Viljandi	Viljandi linnastaadion	1,068
Welco	Tartu	Holm Park	580

== League table ==
Pos	Team	Pld	W	D	L	GF	GA	GD	Pts	Promotion, qualification or relegation
1	Welco (C, P)	36	23	5	8	92	42	+50	74	Promotion to Esiliiga
2	Tallinna Kalev U21 (P)	36	19	10	7	99	53	+46	67	Promotion to Esiliiga
3	Narva Trans U21	36	19	7	10	69	48	+21	64	
4	Tartu Kalev	36	18	7	11	85	71	+14	61	Qualification for Esiliiga play-off
5	Kuressaare U21	36	17	10	9	87	76	+11	61	
6	Tulevik	36	16	7	13	58	55	+3	55	
7	Tammeka U21	36	12	8	16	63	70	−7	44	
8	Nõmme Kalju U21 (O)	36	12	5	19	90	103	−13	41	Qualification for Esiliiga B play-off
9	Läänemaa (O)	36	8	2	26	67	120	−53	26	Qualification for Esiliiga B play-off
10	Pärnu Jalgpalliklubi (Note: Pärnu Jalgpalliklubi were reprieved from relegation after Alliance, relegated to the 2024 Esiliiga B, folded.)	36	3	5	28	34	106	−72	14	

Source: Esiliiga B
Rules for classification: 1) Points; 2) Less matches awarded against; 3) Head-to-head points; 4) Head-to-head goal difference; 5) Matches won; 6) Goal difference; 7) Goals scored; 8) Away goals scored; 9) Fair-play points; 10) Draw
(C) Champions; (O) Play-off winners; (P) Promoted

== Results ==
=== Matches 1–18 ===
Home \ Away	KUR	LÄÄ	NAR	NÕM	PJK	KAL	TAM	TAR	TUL	WEL
Kuressaare U21	—	2–2	2–0	5–4	3–0	2–1	4–0	3–3	0–1	3–3
Läänemaa	0–3	—	1–4	8–6	3–2	3–5	2–2	2–3	1–2	4–1
Narva Trans U21	5–1	3–0	—	1–1	1–1	0–0	1–3	2–0	2–1	2–1
Nõmme Kalju U21	1–2	0–1	1–3	—	2–0	1–4	5–2	4–5	7–2	0–4
Pärnu Jalgpalliklubi	0–6	0–2	0–2	0–7	—	0–1	3–4	2–2	1–1	0–1
Tallinna Kalev U21	3–3	6–0	1–0	3–4	6–0	—	2–1	3–3	3–0	1–0
Tammeka U21	0–1	4–3	1–2	0–2	1–1	1–1	—	3–3	1–1	0–1
Tartu Kalev	5–4	2–1	4–1	5–2	7–0	0–3	2–1	—	1–3	0–2
Tulevik	4–1	3–2	4–0	2–2	3–1	2–0	0–1	0–3	—	0–1
Welco	2–2	4–0	0–2	5–2	5–0	4–4	1–2	2–0	1–1	—

Source: Estonian Football Association (in Estonian)
Legend: Blue = home team win; Yellow = draw; Red = away team win.

=== Matches 19–36 ===
Home \ Away	KUR	LÄÄ	NAR	NÕM	PJK	KAL	TAM	TAR	TUL	WEL
Kuressaare U21	—	3–2	1–1	4–3	3–2	2–2	4–2	5–2	1–3	1–6
Läänemaa	2–4	—	3–4	2–5	3–2	2–5	2–3	2–3	1–2	1–3
Narva Trans U21	1–1	7–1	—	1–1	3–1	1–0	3–0	4–1	0–1	4–3
Nõmme Kalju U21	2–0	1–6	1–2	—	1–2	3–3	4–4	5–3	2–0	3–4
Pärnu Jalgpalliklubi	2–4	0–1	1–4	2–0	—	2–1	1–2	3–3	1–3	0–5
Tallinna Kalev U21	2–2	8–1	2–1	2–4	7–2	—	3–1	0–0	7–2	3–2
Tammeka U21	1–1	6–0	2–1	7–0	3–0	0–3	—	0–3	1–0	2–2
Tartu Kalev	4–1	5–2	2–0	0–1	2–1	2–3	2–1	—	2–2	1–0
Tulevik	0–3	4–1	1–1	5–1	1–0	1–1	3–1	0–1	—	0–2
Welco	5–0	3–0	4–0	4–2	3–1	1–0	3–0	3–1	1–0	—

Source: Estonian Football Association (in Estonian)
Legend: Blue = home team win; Yellow = draw; Red = away team win.

== Esiliiga B play-off ==
The two runners-up (or highest eligible team) from the 2023 II liiga (Jõhvi Phoenix and Saku Sporting) contested the semi-finals over two legs.

The semi-final winners and second highest-ranked II liiga team (Harju II) advanced to each face either the eighth or ninth-placed Esiliiga B teams (Nõmme Kalju U21 and Läänemaa) over two legs, with the two winners securing the final two places in the following season's Esiliiga B.

== Semi-final ==
=== First leg ===
19 November 2023	Jõhvi Phoenix	6–1	Saku Sporting	Jõhvi
12:00 BST				Stadium: Voka Stadium

=== Second leg ===
22 November 2023	Saku Sporting	2–5 (3–11 agg.)	Jõhvi Phoenix	Saku Parish
17:00 BST				Stadium: Saku staadion

== Final ==
=== First legs ===
22 November 2023	Harju II	1–2	Nõmme Kalju U21	Laagri
17:00 BST				Stadium: Laagri Stadium

22 November 2023	Jõhvi Phoenix	3–0	Läänemaa	Jõhvi
17:00 BST				Stadium: Voka Stadium

=== Second legs ===
25 November 2023	Nõmme Kalju U21	0–0 (2–1 agg.)	Harju II	Nõmme
12:00 BST				Stadium: Hiiu Stadium

29 November 2023	Läänemaa	6–2 (6–5 agg.)	Jõhvi Phoenix	Haapsalu
16:00 BST				Stadium: Haapsalu linnastaadion

== Season statistics ==
=== Top scorers ===
Rank	Player	Club	Goals
1	(Estonia) Priit Peedo	Tartu Kalev	36
2	(Estonia) Kenlou Laasner	Tallinna Kalev U21	33
3	(Estonia) Martin Jõgi	Welco	31
4	(Estonia) Andero Kivi	Kuressaare U21	30
5	(Canada) Promise David	Nõmme Kalju U21	22
6	(Georgia (country)) Akaki Gvineria	Tammeka U21	18
7	(Estonia) Maarek Suursaar	Kuressaare U21	17
7	(Estonia) Andreas Tiits	Läänemaa	17
9	(Estonia) Deniss Drabinko	Nõmme Kalju U21	15
10	(Estonia) Juhan Jograf Siim	Läänemaa	14

== Awards ==
=== Monthly awards ===
Month	Player of the Month		Manager of the Month	
Month	Player	Club	Manager	Club
March	(Estonia) Priit Peedo	Tartu Kalev	(Estonia) Sander Viira	Kuressaare U21
April	(Estonia) Martin Jõgi	Welco	(Estonia) Indrek Ilves	Tulevik
May	(Estonia) Kenlou Laasner	Tallinna Kalev U21	(Estonia) Maksim Gruznov	Narva Trans U21
June/July	(Estonia) Priit Peedo	Tartu Kalev	(Estonia) Sander Viira	Kuressaare U21
August	(Estonia) Johannes Metsmaa	Tulevik	(Estonia) Ats Purje	Tallinna Kalev U21
September	(Estonia) Miikal Roos	Welco	(Estonia) Jaanus Reitel	Welco
October	(Estonia) Martin Jõgi	Welco	(Estonia) Jaanus Reitel	Welco

=== Annual awards ===
The Esiliiga B Player of the Year was awarded to Priit Peedo.
