= JK Vaprus Vändra =

Estonian football club

Vändra Vaprus
- Full name: Jalgpalliklubi Vändra Vaprus
- Founded: 2009
- Ground: Vändra Stadium, Vändra
- Capacity: 307
- Chairman: Silver Kurg
- Manager: Ranet Lepik
- League: Esiliiga B
- 2020: Esiliiga, 9th (relegated)
- Website: http://www.jkvandra.ee
Home colours	Away colours

JK Vändra Vaprus is an Estonian football club based in Vändra.

== History ==
Vändra Vaprus were founded on 30 September 2009 by Pärnu Vaprus in cooperation with the Vändra borough. The team represents the borough of Vändra in the Estonian football league system and the Estonian Cup games. Vändra Vaprus are associated with the Pärnu Vaprus football academy and were the reserve team for Pärnu Linnameeskond. On 22 February 2013, the Estonian Football Association announced that Pärnu Linnameeskond will be relegated from Esiliiga to Esiliiga B and Vändra Vaprus, who finished 2012 II liiga West/South division third, will be taking their place in the 2013 Esiliiga season.

Their stint in the second highest division in Estonia came to an end in 2016, when they finished second to last. Although they were ninth for the third successive time, then on the previous occasions they got readmitted to the league. After the season, the players decided that they will be competing in Esiliiga B in 2017. The season in the third division did not start well (six losses from first nine games), but from May to August they were undefeated for eleven matches in a row. In the end of the season, they were constantly battling for a place in the top two, which they ultimately lost. Although their third-placed finish allowed them to get promoted to Esiliiga, Vaprus opted against it.

After an unsuccessful year, Vaprus again finished at the top of the Esiliiga B table. This time they decided to get promoted and competed in the 2020 Esiliiga season. They spent almost the entire year in the bottom three and finally, on 8 November, their relegation to Esiliiga B was confirmed.

== Players ==
=== Current squad ===
Updated 6 March 2016.

Note: Flags indicate national team as defined under FIFA eligibility rules; some limited exceptions apply. Players may hold more than one non-FIFA nationality.

No.	Pos.	Nation	Player
1	GK	(Estonia) EST	Toivo Teetsmann
2	DF	(Estonia) EST	Chris Anderson
3	DF	(Estonia) EST	Karl-Sander Eensoo
4	DF	(Estonia) EST	Maigo Vaakmann
5	DF	(Estonia) EST	Oliver Ojala
6	DF	(Estonia) EST	Indrek Oja
7	MF	(Estonia) EST	Karel Otto (captain)
10	FW	(Estonia) EST	Harris Jürissaar
11	MF	(Estonia) EST	Mihkel Jürgenstein
12	MF	(Estonia) EST	Mihhail Kravtšenko
15	MF	(Estonia) EST	Artur Ojala
16	DF	(Estonia) EST	Toomas Eier

No.	Pos.	Nation	Player
17	MF	(Estonia) EST	Toomas Mangusson
19	MF	(Estonia) EST	Alfred Vesselov
21	MF	(Estonia) EST	Anton Issakov
23	DF	(Estonia) EST	Andro Aavik
25	MF	(Estonia) EST	Jargo Pert
27	MF	(Estonia) EST	Ranet Lepik
35	GK	(Estonia) EST	Veiko Põldemaa
39	DF	(Estonia) EST	Jan-Erik Jegorov
42	MF	(Estonia) EST	Margus Poldsaar
45	GK	(Estonia) EST	Hans Naano
72	MF	(Estonia) EST	Martin Pärn
90	MF	(Estonia) EST	Kaarel Saaremets

== Vändra Vaprus in Estonian football ==
Season	Division	Pos	Pld	W	D	L	GF	GA	GD	Pts	Top Goalscorer	Avg. Att.	Cup
2011	III liiga W	1	22	19	3	0	110	22	+88	60	(Estonia) Toomas Mangusson (21)	?	—
2012	II liiga S/W	3	26	15	6	5	68	39	+29	51	(Estonia) Ranet Lepik (19)	?	—
2013	Esiliiga	7	36	12	10	14	61	55	+6	46	(Estonia) Toomas Mangusson (11)	172	—
2014	Esiliiga	9	36	11	5	20	60	72	−12	38	(Estonia) Toomas Mangusson (11)	149	First round
2015	Esiliiga	9	36	11	5	20	43	80	−37	38	(Estonia) Ranet Lepik (12)	115	Second round
2016	Esiliiga	9	36	8	8	20	48	96	−48	32	(Estonia) Kaarel Saaremets (7)	100	—
2017	Esiliiga B	3	36	19	5	12	75	67	+8	62	(Estonia) Kaarel Saaremets (12)	80	—
2018	Esiliiga B	7	36	11	5	20	61	96	–35	38	(Estonia) Kaarel Saaremets (13)	69	—
2019	Esiliiga B	2	36	21	5	10	97	71	+26	68	(Estonia) Martin Pärn (37)	95	—
2020	Esiliiga	9	30	10	2	18	47	72	–25	32	(Estonia) Martin Pärn (12)	109	—
