= Läänemaa JK =

Estonian football club

- Full name: Läänemaa Jalgpalliklubi
- Founded: 18 June 2010; 15 years ago
- Ground: Haapsalu linnastaadion
- Capacity: 1,080
- Manager: Theimo Tülp
- League: II liiga
- 2025: Esiliiga B, 10th of 10 (relegated)
Home colours	Away colours

Läänemaa JK is a football club based in Haapsalu, Estonia, that competes in Esiliiga B, the third tier of Estonian football. The club's home ground is Haapsalu linnastaadion.

== Players ==
=== Current squad ===
As of 25 April 2018.

Note: Flags indicate national team as defined under FIFA eligibility rules; some limited exceptions apply. Players may hold more than one non-FIFA nationality.

No.	Pos.	Nation	Player
1	GK	EST	Hendrik Siht
2	MF	EST	Markus Rouhiainen
3	DF	EST	Bert Rotberg
4	FW	EST	Martin Salf
5	DF	EST	Joosep Altmets
6	DF	EST	Kaarel Koel
7	MF	EST	Siim Suitsberg
8	MF	EST	Aare Avila
9	MF	EST	Karmo Einmann
10	FW	EST	Mario Konks
11	DF	EST	Karel Saarkopli
14	MF	EST	Marten Valk

No.	Pos.	Nation	Player
17	MF	EST	Kristo Enn
20	MF	EST	Talis Tamm
21	MF	EST	Keven Kirs
22	DF	EST	Tarvo Manni
23	MF	EST	Leonid Bragi
30	DF	EST	Andre Kaja
45	MF	EST	Artur Matto
48	GK	EST	Siim Pikkaro
87	MF	EST	Mart Pulst
92	MF	EST	Morten Saar
—	MF	EST	Sven Makienko
—	MF	EST	Eenok Nõlvak

== Statistics ==
=== League and Cup ===
Season	Division	Pos	Teams	Pld	W	D	L	GF	GA	GD	Pts	Top goalscorer	Estonian Cup
2011	IV liiga W	6	11	20	8	3	9	63	60	+3	27	Aleksandr Molkov (22)	-
2012	IV liiga W	1	12	22	19	1	2	117	25	+92	58	Mark Kolosov (57)	-
2013	III liiga W	4	12	22	14	2	6	80	41	+39	44	Mark Kolosov (29)	-
2014	II liiga S/W	12	14	25	8	1	16	36	65	-29	25	Vladislav Šikirjavõi (18)	First round
2015	III liiga W	3	12	22	14	3	5	89	31	+58	55	Vladislav Šikirjavõi (31)	Second round
2016	III liiga W	4	12	22	15	2	5	81	16	+65	47	Andres Dobõšev-Proosväli (22)	Second round
2017	III liiga W	3	12	22	14	1	7	65	49	+16	43	Andres Dobõšev-Proosväli (34)	Fourth round
2018	II liiga S/W	5	14	26	13	2	11	65	57	+8	41	Aare Avila (23)	Fourth round
2019	II liiga S/W	3	14	26	16	1	9	89	66	+33	49	Martin Salf (32)	Second round
2020	Esiliiga B	6	10	28	11	3	14	55	64	-9	36	Karmo Einmann (16)	Second round
2021	Esiliiga B	8	10	30	10	3	17	65	94	-29	33	Juhan Jograf Siim (24)	Third round
2022	Esiliiga B	8	10	36	10	7	19	49	84	-35	37	Martin Salf (19)	Second round
