= Esiliiga B =

Third division in the Estonian football league system

- Founded: 2013; 13 years ago
- Country: Estonia
- Confederation: UEFA
- Divisions: Esiliiga B
- Number of clubs: 10
- Level on pyramid: 3
- Promotion to: Esiliiga
- Relegation to: II liiga
- Domestic cup: Estonian Cup
- Current champions: Maardu Linnameeskond (2025)
- Website: Esiliiga B
- Current: 2026 Esiliiga B

The Esiliiga B is the third division in the Estonian football league system. The Esiliiga B is ranked below the Esiliiga and above the II liiga. As in most countries with low temperatures in winter, the season starts in March and ends in November.

== Competition format ==
The league consists of 10 clubs, all teams play each other four times. Both the winning team and the runners-up are promoted to the Esiliiga directly, whereas the third place club will participate in a two-legged play-off with the 8th place club of the Esiliiga for a spot in next year's competition. Similarly, the 2 bottom placed teams are relegated to the II liiga. The third bottom team can avoid relegation by winning a two-legged play-off against the II Liiga play-off round winners.

== Clubs ==
=== Current clubs ===
The following clubs are competing in the Esiliiga B during the 2026 season.

Club	Position in 2025	Seasons in Esiliiga B	First season of current spell	Titles	Last title
FCI Levadia U19	2nd in II liiga	1	2026	0	—N/a
Jõhvi Phoenix^{a}	3rd	3	2024	0	—N/a
Narva Trans U21^{a, b}	4th	4	2023	0	—N/a
Tabasalu^{a}	6th	6	2025	0	—N/a
Tallinna Kalev U21	9th in Esiliiga	8	2026	0	—N/a
Tammeka U21	10th in Esiliiga	7	2026	1	2024
Tartu Kalev^{a, b}	5th	5	2022	0	—N/a
TJK Legion	7th	6	2024	1	2018
Tulevik	3rd in II liiga	3	2026	0	—N/a
Vaprus U21	1st in II liiga	1	2026	0	—N/a

^{a} – never been relegated from Esiliiga B
^{b} – never played in Esiliiga
^{c} – reserve teams are ineligible for promotion.

== Champions ==
Season	Champions	Runners-up	Third place	Top goalscorer	Goals
2013	Nõmme Kalju II	Pärnu Linnameeskond	Sillamäe Kalev II	(Estonia) Jürgen Kuresoo (Elva)	33
2014	Tallinna Infonet II	Tartu Santos	HÜJK Emmaste	(Ukraine) Yuriy Vereshchak (Tartu Santos)	43
2015	Maardu Starbunker	Kohtla-Järve Järve	Sillamäe Kalev II	(Ukraine) Klimentiy Boldyrev (Maardu Starbunker)	25
2016	Kuressaare	Elva	Tartu Welco	(Estonia) Maarek Suursaar (Kuressaare)	33
2017	Nõmme Kalju U21 (2)	Tallinna Kalev U21	Vändra Vaprus	(Estonia) Karl Anton Sõerde (Tallinna Kalev U21)	29
2018	TJK Legion	Tartu Tammeka U21	Kohtla-Järve Järve	(Estonia) Rejal Alijev (TJK Legion)	40
2019	Nõmme United	Vändra Vaprus	Pärnu	(Estonia) Martin Pärn (Vändra Vaprus)	37
2020	Paide Linnameeskond U21	Tartu Welco	Tallinna Kalev U21	(Estonia) Ander Ott Valge (Paide Linnameeskond U21) (Estonia) Eduard Desjatski (Võru Helios)	24
2021	Viimsi	Harju JK	Ida-Virumaa FC Alliance	(Estonia) Karl Anton Sõerde (Viimsi)	30
2022	FC Tallinn	Tabasalu	Tallinna Kalev U21	(Estonia) Maksim Kalimullin (FC Tallinn)	33
2023	Tartu Welco	Tallinna Kalev U21	Narva Trans U21	(Estonia) Priit Peedo (FA Tartu Kalev)	36
2024	Tartu Tammeka U21	Nõmme Kalju U21	TJK Legion	(Georgia (country)) Akaki Gvineria (Tammeka U21)	24
2025	Maardu Linnameeskond (2)	Nõmme United U21	Jõhvi Phoenix	(Estonia) Aleksandr Volkov (Maardu Linnameeskond)	34

=== All-time Esiliiga B table ===
The table is a cumulative record of all match results, points and goals of every team that has played in the Esiliiga B since its inception in 2013. The table that follows is accurate as of the end of the 2025 season. Teams in bold played in the Esiliiga B 2025 season. Numbers in bold are the record (highest) numbers in each column.

In this ranking 3 points are awarded for a win, 1 for a draw, and 0 for a loss. Promotion matches and relegation matches involving clubs of higher or lower leagues are not counted.

The table is sorted by all-time points.

Pos.	Club	Seasons	Pld	W	D	L	GF	GA	GD	Pts	PPG	1st	2nd	3rd	Debut	Since/Last App.	P	R	Best Pos.
1	Viimsi JK (Note: 2013–2015 HÜJK Emmaste; 2016– Viimsi JK)	**8**	**276**	125	**47**	104	523	459	+64	**422**	1.53	1		1	2013	2021	1	1	**1**
2	Nõmme Kalju FC U21 (Note: 2013 Nõmme Kalju II; 2014– Nõmme Kalju U21)	**8**	**276**	**129**	32	115	**591**	538	+53	419	1.52	**2**	1		2013	2024	3		**1**
3	JK Tallinna Kalev U21	7	242	121	46	77	542	376	**+166**	408	1.69		**2**	**2**	2015	2020	3		2
4	Tartu JK Tammeka U21	6	216	104	42	70	490	340	+150	354	1.64	1	1		2016	2024	2		**1**
5	Ida-Virumaa FC Alliance (Note: 2013–2020 Kohtla-Järve JK Järve; 2021– Ida-Virumaa FC Alliance)	6	212	89	32	91	343	342	+1	299	1.41		1	**2**	2013	2021	**3**		2
6	**Tallinna JK Legion**	5	180	83	22	75	363	361	+2	271	1.51	1		1	2013	2024	1	1	**1**
7	JK Sillamäe Kalev U21	5	180	79	26	75	336	320	+16	263	1.46			**2**	2013	2017		1	3
8	Tartu JK Welco	4	138	80	21	37	315	189	+126	261	1.89	1	1	1	2016	2022	**3**		**1**
9	**Tabasalu JK**	5	180	79	24	67	375	306	+69	261	1.45		1		2019	2025	1		2
10	**Maardu Linnameeskond (Note: 2013–2015 Maardu FC Starbunker; 2016– Maardu Linnameeskond)**	3	108	70	10	28	278	162	+116	220	2.04	**2**			2014	2025	1		**1**
11	**FA Tartu Kalev**	4	144	64	25	55	281	269	+12	217	1.51				2022	2022			4
12	**Paide Linnameeskond U21**	5	174	62	27	85	333	371	−38	213	1.22	1			2017	2025	1		**1**
13	FC Elva	4	144	62	23	59	230	227	+3	209	1.45		1		2013	2016	1		2
14	Vändra JK Vaprus	4	138	60	19	59	280	307	-27	199	1.44		1	1	2017	2021	1	1	2
15	**Läänemaa JK**	6	202	54	23	125	331	**588**	−257	185	0.92				2020	2020			6
16	**JK Narva Trans U21**	3	108	55	19	34	213	152	+61	184	1.70			1	2023	2023			3
17	Pärnu Jalgpalliklubi	4	144	48	22	74	242	304	-62	166	1.15			1	2018	2024	1	1	3
18	Raasiku FC Joker	3	108	41	28	39	198	196	+2	151	1.40				2015	2017		1	5
19	FC Nõmme United	2	72	44	13	15	227	95	+132	145	2.01	1			2018	2019	1		**1**
20	Keila JK	3	102	40	16	46	202	236	-34	136	1.33				2017	2019	1	1	4
21	**FC Kuressaare U21**	3	108	40	15	53	193	251	-58	135	1.25				2023	2023			4
22	FC Tallinn	2	68	40	11	17	185	104	+81	131	1.93	1			2021	2022	1		**1**
23	Võru FC Helios	3	102	35	18	49	183	235	-52	123	1.21				2018	2020		1	6
24	Tallinna FC Ararat	3	108	35	15	58	183	244	−61	120	1.11				2013	2015		1	4
25	**Jõhvi FC Phoenix**	2	72	33	14	25	173	142	+31	113	1.57			1	2024	2024			3
26	Tallinna FC Flora U19 (Note: 2013–2015 Tallinna Flora III; 2016– Tallinna Flora U19)	5	180	28	22	**130**	187	523	−336	106	0.59				2013	2018		**2**	9
27	FCI Tallinn U21	1	36	32	3	1	124	34	+90	99	**2.75**	1			2014	2014	1		**1**
28	Tartu FC Santos	1	36	32	0	4	161	27	+134	96	2.67		1		2014	2014	1		2
29	Viljandi JK Tulevik	2	72	26	12	34	107	129	-22	90	1.25				2023	2024		1	6
30	Pärnu Linnameeskond	1	36	25	4	7	114	53	+61	79	2.19		1		2013	2013	1		2
31	Tallinna JK Legion U21	2	66	25	4	37	124	169	−45	79	1.20				2021	2021			6
32	FC Kuressaare	1	36	23	7	6	117	48	+69	76	2.11	1			2016	2016	1		**1**
33	**FC Nõmme United U21**	1	36	23	3	10	93	53	+40	72	2.00		1		2025	2025			2
34	Harju JK Laagri	1	32	20	3	9	88	49	+39	63	1.97		1		2021	2021	1		2
35	Tallinna JK Puuma	1	36	13	5	18	60	89	−29	44	1.22				2015	2015		1	8
36	Tallinna JK Dünamo	1	36	9	4	23	42	86	−44	31	0.86				2013	2013		1	8
37	Põhja-Tallinna JK Volta	1	36	9	2	25	53	123	−70	29	0.81				2019	2019		1	10
38	Lasnamäe FC Ajax	1	36	4	4	28	35	135	-100	16	0.44				2018	2018		1	9
39	Viljandi JK Tulevik U21	1	36	4	2	30	26	142	−116	14	0.39				2016	2016		1	10
40	Rakvere JK Tarvas	1	30	3	1	26	26	96	−70	10	0.33				2020	2020		1	10
41	Raplamaa JK	1	36	2	3	31	31	121	−90	9	0.25				2022	2022		1	10

League or status at 2025:

2025 Meistriliiga teams
2025 Esiliiga teams
2025 Esiliiga B teams
2025 II liiga teams
2025 II liiga B teams
2025 III liiga teams
2025 IV liiga teams
Defunct teams

== See also ==
- Esiliiga B Player of the Year
- Meistriliiga
- Esiliiga
- Estonian Cup
