= Paide Linnameeskond U21 =

Estonian football reserve team

- Full name: Paide Linnameeskond U21
- Short name: PLMU21
- Founded: 2008; 18 years ago
- Ground: Paide linnastaadion, Paide
- Manager: Viktor Mets
- League: II liiga
- 2025: Esiliiga B, 8th of 10 (relegated via play-offs)

Paide Linnameeskond U21 is an Estonian football club, the reserve team of Paide Linnameeskond. Until 2013 they played under the name Paide Kumake.

== Statistics ==
=== League and Cup ===
Season	Division	Pos	Teams	Pld	W	D	L	GF	GA	GD	Pts	Top Goalscorer	Estonian Cup	Notes
2008	IV Liiga W	2	12	22	16	4	2	92	24	+68	52	Alar Arula (24)		as Paide Kumake
2009	III Liiga W	4	12	22	12	2	8	46	44	+2	38	Giorgi Feštšin (7)		as Paide Kumake
2010	III Liiga W	1	12	22	17	2	3	78	14	+64	53	Alar Arula (17)	First round	as Paide Kumake
2011	II Liiga W/S	3	14	26	17	3	6	64	28	+36	54	Martin Muiste (14)	Second round	as Paide Kumake
2012	II Liiga S/W	6	14	26	14	3	9	83	46	+37	45	Rauno Kööp (20)	Fourth round	as Paide Kumake
2013	III Liiga W	1	12	22	18	3	1	81	16	+65	57	Karel Seire (16)	Second round	as Paide Linnameeskond II
2014	II Liiga N/E	1	14	26	19	4	3	81	28	+53	61	Rauno Kööp and Tarmo Paju (10)		as Paide Linnameeskond II
2015	II Liiga N/E	1	14	26	19	4	3	81	41	+40	61	Rauno Kööp (20)		as Paide Linnameeskond II
2016	II Liiga S/W	1	14	26	21	4	1	92	24	+68	67	Rauno Rikberg (19)		as Paide Linnameeskond II
2017	Esiliiga B	9	10	36	9	7	20	50	79	-29	34	Tristan Koskor (6)		as Paide Linnameeskond II

== Players ==
=== Current squad ===
As of 5 March 2024.

Note: Flags indicate national team as defined under FIFA eligibility rules; some limited exceptions apply. Players may hold more than one non-FIFA nationality.

No.	Pos.	Nation	Player
21	MF	EST	Matrix Einer
22	MF	EST	Sander Soo
26	FW	EST	Rafael Luts
32	MF	EST	Kert Kiik
40	DF	EST	Marcus Pajumaa
43	DF	EST	Markus Piim
44	FW	EST	Martin Mõttus
45	DF	EST	Ranet Hulko
46	DF	EST	Kaspar-Markus Reivik
48	DF	EST	Kevin Kärp
50	DF	EST	Kevin Metso
51	FW	EST	Mart Konno

No.	Pos.	Nation	Player
52	MF	EST	Simon Usar
54	MF	EST	Arkadi Burujan
57	DF	EST	Karlis Ellermaa
58	DF	EST	Jander Poolma
70	GK	EST	Rando Isakar
71	MF	EST	Kardo Kallas
72	MF	EST	Jaan Joosep Kuuse
73	FW	EST	Radion Trofimov
74	DF	EST	Kaspar Ivanov
81	DF	EST	Markus Lieberg
84	GK	EST	Kevin-Marcus Hirbaum
89	GK	EST	Hugo-Kaur Leht
