= FC Tallinn =

Estonian football club

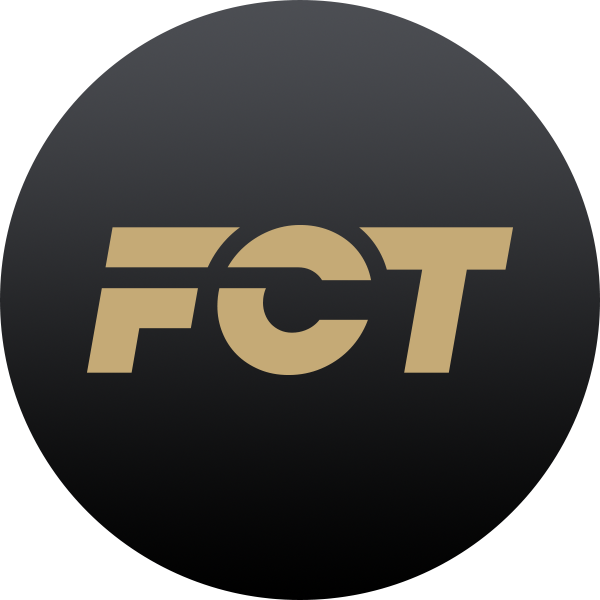
- Full name: Football Club Tallinn
- Short name: FCT
- Founded: 2017; 9 years ago
- Ground: Lasnamäe Spordikompleksi kunstmurustaadion
- Capacity: 264
- President: Sergei Gritsenko
- Manager: Andrei Kalimullin
- League: Esiliiga
- 2026: Esiliiga, 8th of 10
- Website: https://fctallinn.ee/et/
Home colours	Away colours

FC Tallinn is a professional football club based in Tallinn, Estonia. Founded in 2017, the club competes in Esiliiga, the second-highest division of Estonian football.

== History ==
FC Tallinn was founded on 17 November 2017 and started operating in Lasnamäe, the most populous district in Tallinn of which majority is Russian-speaking. The club was created after FC Infonet's merger with Levadia left Lasnamäe's football future in uncertainty. The club entered the Estonian league system in 2018 and quickly rose to Esiliiga B, which they won in the 2022 season after narrowly beating JK Tabasalu in the last second of the final matchday.

== Players ==
=== Current squad ===
As of 24 July, 2026 Note: Flags indicate national team as defined under FIFA eligibility rules; some limited exceptions apply. Players may hold more than one non-FIFA nationality.

No.	Pos.	Nation	Player
1	GK	EST	Sander Liiker
2	DF	EST	Platon-Ell Mitin
4	MF	EST	Igor Mohhov
5	MF	EST	Vadim Aksjonov
7	FW	EST	Eduard Golovljov
8	MF	EST	Mihhail Hansman
10	MF	EST	Artjom Dmitrijev
11	FW	RUS	Nikita Shevchuk
14	DF	EST	Denis Zhuravlev
15	MF	EST	Artjom Slobodjan
17	DF	EST	David Fomin
20	FW	EST	Leonid Arhipov (on loan from Legion)
22	DF	EST	Nikita Salamatov
24	DF	ISR	Daniil Shevyakov
25	GK	EST	Mark Usachev

No.	Pos.	Nation	Player
26	FW	EST	Osvald Toome
27	DF	EST	Igor Ussatsov
28	MF	EST	Stefan Tšendei
29	MF	EST	Artjom Toropov
35	MF	EST	Marat Sesterikov
39	MF	EST	Vladimir Istsenko
41	MF	EST	Aleksander Iljin
44	MF	RUS	Kirill Nesterov
45	MF	EST	Ismail Soroka
77	DF	UKR	Antoniy Vynnychuk
78	FW	EST	Ervin Irha
89	FW	EST	Lucas Leis
95	DF	EST	Vladimir Avilov
99	GK	EST	Oskar Järvine

=== Out on loan ===
Note: Flags indicate national team as defined under FIFA eligibility rules; some limited exceptions apply. Players may hold more than one non-FIFA nationality.

No.	Pos.	Nation	Player

== Personnel ==
=== Current technical staff ===
Position	Name
Owner	(Estonia) Sergei Gritsenko
Sporting director	(Estonia) Andrei Stepanov
Director of football	(Estonia) Alex Aalen
Head coach	(Estonia) Andrei Kalimullin
Assistant coach	(Estonia) Deniss Malov
Goalkeeper coach	(Estonia) Ilja Kassjantšuk

== Statistics ==
=== League and cup ===
Season	Division	Pos	Pld	W	D	L	GF	GA	GD	Pts	Top goalscorer	Cup
2018	IV liiga N/E	2	21	13	4	4	75	31	+44	43	(Lithuania) Vitas Mališauskas (28)	First round
2019	III liiga E	1	22	19	1	2	111	25	+86	58	(Estonia) Andrei Kalimullin (19)	—
2020	II liiga N/E	2	26	19	3	4	82	29	+53	60	(Estonia) Artjom Badjuk (25)	Fourth round
2021	Esiliiga B	4	32	16	2	14	68	66	+2	50	(Estonia) Viktor Plotnikov (18)	Third round
2022	Esiliiga B	1	36	24	9	3	117	38	+79	81	(Estonia) Maksim Kalimullin (33)	ongoing
