= Kohtla-Järve Spordikeskuse staadion =

Stadium in Kohtla-Järve, Estonia

Coordinates: 59°23′52.03″N 27°15′32.17″E

- Interactive map of Kohtla-Järve Spordikeskuse staadion
- Location: Kohtla-Järve, Estonia
- Owner: Kohtla-Järve Spordikeskus
- Capacity: 150
- Surface: Grass
- Field size: 100 x 64 m

Tenants
- Ida-Virumaa FC Alliance (2013–2022); Kohtla-Järve FC Lootus (–2012)

Kohtla-Järve Spordikeskuse staadion is a multi-use stadium in Kohtla-Järve, Estonia. It has mostly been used for football matches and has been the home ground for FC Lootus Kohtla-Järve and Ida-Virumaa FC Alliance. The stadium used to hold 780 to 2,200 people, but the grandstand was demolished in 2020.

== Estonia national team matches ==
Kohtla-Järve has hosted the Estonia national football team once, in 1998.

Date		Result	Competition	Attendance
20 August 1998	Estonia – Moldova	0–1	Friendly	1,000
