= Keila JK =

Estonian football club

- Full name: Keila Jalgpalliklubi
- Founded: 1995; 30 years ago
- Ground: Keila Stadium
- Manager: Tiit Tikenberg
- League: Esiliiga B
- 2018: Esiliiga, 9th (relegation play-off)
- Website: www.keilajk.ee
| Home colours | Away colours |

Keila JK is a football club based in Keila, Estonia. Founded in 1995, it currently plays in II Liiga.

== Players ==
=== First-team squad ===
As of 13 March 2018.

Note: Flags indicate national team as defined under FIFA eligibility rules; some limited exceptions apply. Players may hold more than one non-FIFA nationality.

| No. | Pos. | Nation | Player |
|---|---|---|---|
| 1 | GK | EST | Ergo Veeremaa |
| 2 | DF | EST | Toomas Kelo |
| 4 | DF | EST | Kristjan Jürgenson |
| 5 | DF | EST | Braien Kaldoja |
| 7 | FW | EST | Mirza Gassimov |
| 8 | FW | EST | Oliver Suur |
| 9 | DF | EST | Marko Mõek |
| 13 | DF | EST | Kaspar Kaldoja |
| 14 | FW | EST | Tiit Tikenberg |
| 15 | FW | EST | Henry Rohtla |
| 18 | DF | EST | Martin Uusla |
| 20 | MF | EST | Ralf Friedemann |

| No. | Pos. | Nation | Player |
|---|---|---|---|
| 29 | MF | EST | Rando Leokin |
| 30 | DF | EST | Raido Leokin |
| 37 | MF | EST | Carl Kalju |
| 42 | MF | EST | Erkki Pärna |
| 44 | DF | EST | Mait Nomme |
| 46 | MF | EST | Gregor Aru |
| 52 | GK | EST | Marek Lahne |
| 74 | DF | EST | Egon Mõek |
| 76 | GK | EST | Kermo Kiiler |
| 77 | FW | EST | Kasper Karl Epner |
| 88 | DF | EST | Priit Danelson |

== Statistics ==
=== League and Cup ===
| Season | Division | Pos | Teams | Pld | W | D | L | GF | GA | GD | Pts | Avg. Att | Top Goalscorer | Estonian Cup | Notes |
|---|---|---|---|---|---|---|---|---|---|---|---|---|---|---|---|
| 1998 | II Liiga S/W | 8 | 8 | 10 | 2 | 0 | 8 | 10 | 36 | −26 | 6 | | Aivar Israel (10) | | as Keila JK |
| 1999 | III Liiga W | 4 | 6 | 20 | 7 | 4 | 9 | 38 | 34 | +4 | 25 | | Aivar Israel (12) | | as Keila JK |
| 2000 | III Liiga W | 3 | 6 | 20 | 12 | 2 | 6 | 49 | 33 | +16 | 38 | | Aivar Israel (19) | | as Keila JK |
| 2001 | III Liiga W | 2 | 10 | 18 | 11 | 1 | 6 | 39 | 22 | +17 | 34 | | Aivar Israel (13) | | as Keila JK Alibi |
| 2002 | III Liiga W | 4 | 10 | 18 | 8 | 3 | 7 | 36 | 22 | +17 | 27 | | Aivar Israel (14) | | as Keila JK Alibi |
| 2003 | III Liiga W | 4 | 10 | 18 | 10 | 4 | 4 | 57 | 26 | +31 | 34 | | Timo Pikpoom (18) | | as Keila JK Alibi |
| 2004 | III Liiga W | 9 | 10 | 18 | 6 | 2 | 10 | 28 | 49 | −21 | 20 | | Aivar Israel and Timo Pikpoom (5) | | as Keila JK Alibi |
| 2005 | III Liiga W | 8 | 12 | 22 | 8 | 6 | 8 | 38 | 48 | −10 | 30 | | Priidu Ahven (15) | | as Keila JK Alibi |
| 2006 | III Liiga W | 6 | 12 | 22 | 9 | 3 | 10 | 42 | 55 | −13 | 30 | | Timo Pikpoom (12) | | as Keila JK Alibi |
| 2007 | III Liiga W | 12 | 10 | 18 | 0 | 0 | 22 | 0 | 61 | −61 | 0 | | | | as Keila JK Alibi |
| 2008 | IV Liiga W | 6 | 12 | 22 | 10 | 7 | 5 | 50 | 33 | +17 | 37 | | Raido Leokin (9) | | as Keila JK |
| 2009 | III Liiga E | 8 | 12 | 22 | 6 | 5 | 11 | 42 | 62 | −20 | 23 | 28 | Rando Leokin (9) | | as Keila JK |
| 2010 | III Liiga W | 9 | 12 | 22 | 7 | 2 | 13 | 42 | 53 | −11 | 23 | 31 | Rando Leokin (10) | | as Keila JK |
| 2011 | III Liiga W | 2 | 12 | 22 | 15 | 5 | 2 | 94 | 24 | +70 | 50 | 65 | Rando Leokin (21) | First Round | as Keila JK |
| 2012 | II Liiga S/W | 10 | 14 | 26 | 11 | 3 | 12 | 51 | 63 | −12 | 36 | 71 | Henry Rohtla (21) | Third Round | as Keila JK |
| 2013 | II Liiga S/W | 8 | 14 | 26 | 12 | 3 | 11 | 67 | 48 | +19 | 39 | 59 | Priit Danelson (17) | Second Round | as Keila JK |
| 2014 | II Liiga S/W | 6 | 14 | 26 | 10 | 3 | 12 | 45 | 57 | −12 | 33 | 37 | Raido Leokin (12) | | as Keila JK |
| 2015 | II Liiga S/W | 5 | 14 | 26 | 14 | 3 | 9 | 61 | 45 | +16 | 45 | 43 | Rando Leokin (19) | Third Round | as Keila JK |
| 2016 | II Liiga S/W | 2 | 14 | 26 | 20 | 2 | 4 | 93 | 32 | +61 | 62 | 94 | Meelis Reiss (31) | First Round | as Keila JK |
| 2017 | Esiliiga B | 4 | 10 | 36 | 18 | 6 | 12 | 75 | 55 | +20 | 60 | 94 | Henry Rohtla (17) | Second Round | as Keila JK |
| 2018 | Esiliiga | 9 | 10 | 36 | 10 | 5 | 21 | 41 | 88 | -47 | 35 | 99 | Ralf Friedemann (8) | | as Keila JK |
