= Pärnu Jalgpalliklubi =

Estonian football club

Pärnu JK
- Full name: Pärnu Jalgpalliklubi
- Founded: 21 July 1989; 36 years ago
- Ground: Pärnu Rannastaadion
- Capacity: 1,501
- Chairman: Raio Piiroja
- Manager: Gert Olesk
- League: II liiga
- 2024: Esiliiga B, 10th of 10 (relegated)
- Website: https://parnujk.ee/
Home colours	Away colours

Pärnu Jalgpalliklubi (transl. Pärnu Football Club), commonly known as PJK, or simply as Pärnu, is an Estonian football club based in Pärnu.

Founded in 1989, Pärnu JK is mostly known for its women's team (Pärnu JK women), who until 2019 competed in the Estonian top division Naiste Meistriliiga. Domestically, Pärnu won a record 13 Naiste Meistriliiga, 6 Estonian Women's Cup and 7 Estonian Women's Supercup trophies.

The club's men's team last played in the second division Esiliiga.

== Players ==
=== Current squad ===
As of 7 March 2022.

Note: Flags indicate national team as defined under FIFA eligibility rules; some limited exceptions apply. Players may hold more than one non-FIFA nationality.

No.	Pos.	Nation	Player
2	DF	EST	Veiko Vespere
5	MF	EST	Karmo Valk
6	MF	EST	Joonas Sild
7	MF	EST	Eke Tormis Pikk
8	FW	EST	Risto Kauniste
9	MF	EST	Tanel Melts
10	DF	EST	Hevar Aas
11	MF	EST	Risto Pärnat

No.	Pos.	Nation	Player
12	FW	EST	Silver Õismets
14	DF	EST	Jako Kanter
16	MF	EST	Igor Mohhov
20	DF	EST	Mirko Mardiste
21	MF	EST	Reimo Madissoo
35	GK	EST	Kaupo Koort
44	DF	UKR	Nazar Vyzdryk
69	MF	EST	Oliver Vaabel

== Personnel ==
=== Current technical staff ===
Position	Name
Manager	(Estonia) Igor Prins
Assistant manager	(Estonia) Gert Olesk

=== Managerial history ===
Dates	Name
2014–2017	(Estonia) Jüri Ivanov
2017–2022	(Estonia) Igor Prins
2022–	(Estonia) Gert Olesk

== Statistics ==
=== League and Cup ===
Season	Division	Pos	Pld	W	D	L	GF	GA	GD	Pts	Top goalscorer	Cup	Notes
1992	Meistriliiga	4	6	2	2	2	10	12	-2	6	Jaan Saal (6)		as Pärnu JK
1992	Championship	8	7	1	1	5	10	22	-12	3			as Pärnu JK
1992/93	II Liiga	1	6	4	2	0	24	7	+17	10			as Pärnu JK/Kalev
1993/94	Esiliiga	1	20	14	2	4	70	28	+42	30	Vadim Dolinin (21)		as Pärnu JK/Kalev
1994/94	Meistriliiga	7	14	2	1	11	12	35	-23	7	Sergei Terehhov (3)		as Pärnu JK/Kalev
1994/94	Meistriliiga Transition	2	10	6	0	4	35	24	+11	18			as Pärnu JK/Kalev
1995/96	Meistriliiga	8	14	0	2	12	8	61	-53	2	Teet Allas (2)		as Pärnu JK
1995/96	Meistriliiga Transition	2	10	6	0	4	35	24	+11	18			as Pärnu JK
1996/97	Esiliiga	3	14	7	2	5	27	20	+7	23			as Pärnu JK
1996/97	Meistriliiga Transition	3	10	4	1	5	9	27	-18	13			as Pärnu JK
1997/98	Esiliiga	7	14	3	3	8	21	33	-12	12	Aleksandr Žurbi and Kauri Link (3)		as Pärnu JK
1997/98	Esiliiga Transition	3	14	8	4	2	30	17	+13	28			as Pärnu JK
1998	Esiliiga	8	14	1	2	11	14	40	-26	5	Marek Markson and Oleg Mjassojedov (3)		as Pärnu JK
1999–2001	did not participate												
2002	V Liiga S/W	1	14	13	0	1	77	15	+62	39	Denis Baranov (18)		as Pärnu JK
2003–2013	did not participate												
2014	IV Liiga S	1	16	14	2	0	43	6	+37	44	Jako Kanter (9)		as Pärnu JK
2015	III Liiga W	1	22	17	4	1	79	21	+58	55	Albert Anissimov (20)		as Pärnu JK
2016	II Liiga S/W	4	26	19	0	7	98	45	+53	57	Veiko Vespere (27)		as Pärnu JK
2017	II Liiga S/W	2	26	19	3	4	102	28	+74	60	Risto Kauniste (18)		as Pärnu JK
2018	Esiliiga B	4	36	18	7	11	80	51	+29	61	Kein Makovei (27)		as Pärnu JK
2019	Esiliiga B	3	36	19	5	12	82	53	+29	62	Kein Makovei (24)		as Pärnu JK
2020	Esiliiga	8	30	11	7	12	61	56	+5	40	Kein Makovei (12)		as Pärnu JK
2021	Esiliiga	8	30	8	5	17	38	61	-23	29	Silard Simanis (12)		as Pärnu JK
2022	Esiliiga	10	36	4	8	24	30	77	-47	20	Silver Õismets (7)		as Pärnu JK
