= Paide linnastaadion =

Stadium in Paide, Estonia

- Interactive map of Paide linnastaadion
- Location: Paide, Estonia
- Coordinates: 58.87845°N 25.54063°E
- Owner: Town of Paide
- Operator: SA Paide Spordikeskus
- Capacity: 500
- Surface: Grass
- Field size: 100 × 66 m

Construction
- Opened: 2002; 24 years ago

Tenant
- Paide Linnameeskond (2004–2025)

Paide linnastaadion (English: Paide City Stadium) is a multi-use stadium in Paide, Estonia. It is currently used mostly for football trainings and formerly hosted the home matches of Paide Linnameeskond. The stadium has a seating capacity of 500.

The stadium hosted Estonian top flight football from 2009 until 2025 and remained the league's smallest stadium throughout that period, both in terms of capacity and field size.

== History ==
The construction of the stadium and nearby Paide Ühisgümnaasium school building began in 1989, but due to financial reasons only the school building was completed. In 2001, 1.4 million EEK were received from the state budget to complete the stadium, upon which the city also added over 1.9 million EEK. The stadium was opened on 16 September 2002.

In 2024, the stadium's field size was expanded from 96 × 62 m to 100 × 66 m.

In 2026, Paide Linnameeskond announced they would move away from Paide linnastaadion to the adjacent artificial turf ground Paide kunstmuruväljak. The club cited the artificial turf ground's better infrastructure and technical conditions for players and spectators, and stated that further investment in Paide linnastaadion was no longer justified, as the stadium is expected to serve primarily as a training field once the club's planned new stadium is built.
