= Tartu JK Tammeka U21 =

Estonian football reserve team

- Full name: Tartu Jalgpalliklubi Tammeka U21
- Founded: 2006; 20 years ago
- Ground: Tartu Sepa jalgpallikeskuse kunstmuruväljak, Tartu
- Manager: Marti Pähn
- League: Esiliiga
- 2026: Esiliiga B, 3rd of 10 (promoted)

Tartu JK Tammeka U21 is the reserve team of JK Tammeka Tartu, an Estonian football club. They last played in the Esiliiga, the second level of the Estonian football league pyramid. The team was dissolved for 2014 season because of financial trouble of Tammeka, but reformed later. As of 2023, the team has 25 players.

== History ==
Year	League	Position	Goals +/-	Points
2007	II	5	+ 12	53
2008	II	7	– 3	43
2009	III	2	+ 48	57
2010	III	7	+ 20	39
2011	III	2	+ 42	62
2012	II	8	– 28	37
2013	II	6	+ 13	52
2019	II	4	+ 4	58
2020	II	6	– 7	38
2021	II	9	– 35	23
2023	III	7	– 7	44
2024	III	1	+ 47	74
2025	II	10	– 97	10
2026	III			
