= JK Tallinna Kalev U21 =

Estonian football reserve team

Tallinna Kalev U21
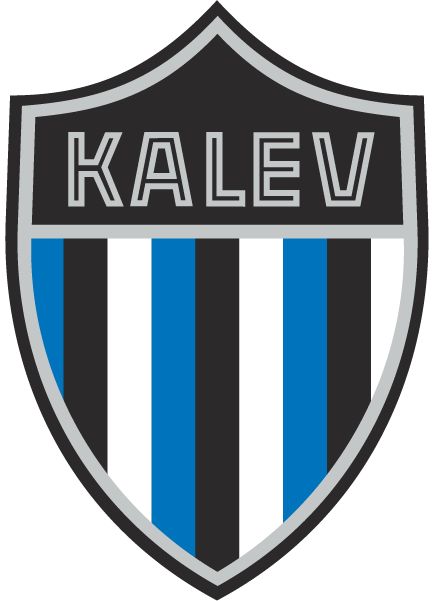
- Full name: JK Tallinna Kalev U21
- Founded: 2004
- Ground: Kalevi Keskstaadioni kunstmuruväljak, Tallinn
- Manager: Ats Purje
- League: Esiliiga B
- 2026: Esiliiga B, 9th of 10
- Website: http://www.jkkalev.ee
Home colours	Away colours

JK Tallinna Kalev U21 is a football club based in Tallinn, Estonia. It is Tallinna Kalev's reserve team. They play their home games at artificial turf next to Kalev Central Stadium. Reserve teams in Estonia play in the same league system as their senior teams rather than a separate league. Reserve teams, however, cannot play in the same division as their senior team. Players can switch between senior and reserve teams.

== History ==
=== Tallinna Kalev U21 in Estonian Football ===
Season	League	Pos	Pld	W	D	L	GF	GA	GD	Pts	Top Goalscorer	Cup
2004	IV Liiga	1	18	13	2	3	71	23	+48	41		
2005	III Liiga	1	22	15	3	4	86	36	+50	48	(Estonia) Andrei Štukin (25)	
2006	II Liiga	3	28	13	3	12	62	70	–8	42	(Estonia) Vitali Kosterev (11)	
2007	II Liiga	6	26	11	8	7	57	37	+20	41	(Estonia) Andrei Afanasov (10)	
2008	II Liiga	7	26	12	7	7	51	40	+11	43	(Estonia) Andrei Afanasov (21)	First round
2009	II Liiga	7	26	12	4	10	87	68	+19	40	(Estonia) Andrei Afanasov (25)	
2010	II Liiga	9	24	8	3	13	37	55	–18	27	(Estonia) Ilja Monakov (5)	
2011	II Liiga	6	26	12	1	13	59	48	+11	37	(United States) Taylor Amman (Estonia) Ervin Stüf (7)	
2012	II Liiga	10	26	8	7	11	45	49	–4	31	(France) Kassim Aidara (10)	
2013	II Liiga	4	24	13	4	7	65	35	+30	43	(Estonia) Aleksei Savitski (16)	
2014	II Liiga	1	25	20	1	4	77	27	+50	61	(Estonia) Kert Jõeäär (14)	
2015	Esiliiga B	6	36	14	8	14	60	55	+5	50	(Estonia) Kert Jõeäär (12)	
2016	Esiliiga B	5	36	16	7	13	72	53	+19	55	(Estonia) Karl Anton Sõerde (22)	

== Players ==
=== Current squad ===
As of 25 May 2026.

Note: Flags indicate national team as defined under FIFA eligibility rules; some limited exceptions apply. Players may hold more than one non-FIFA nationality.

No.	Pos.	Nation	Player
1	GK	EST	Sander Lepp
2	DF	EST	Airon Kollo
4	DF	EST	Marten Lukas Tamme
5	DF	EST	Rasmus Liiv
6	MF	EST	Sten Luht
6	MF	EST	Rico Palu
7	FW	EST	Rasmus Talu
8	MF	EST	Kenlou Laasner
9	FW	EST	Raiko Ilves
10	MF	FIN	Jari Litmanen
11	MF	EST	Silver Kubensky
12	MF	EST	Aleksandr Surogin
13	GK	EST	Renmer Neidla

No.	Pos.	Nation	Player
14	MF	EST	Dylan Sal-Al-Saller
15	DF	EST	Mikk Siitam
16	DF	EST	Aron Kirt
17	FW	EST	Riko Eiert
19	MF	EST	Marten Luik
20	FW	EST	Hannes Planken
23	FW	EST	Romet Kaupmees
26	DF	EST	Rico Ernits
27	DF	EST	Christopher Kukk
55	FW	EST	Romet Nigula
77	MF	EST	Rasmus Kasela
89	GK	EST	Sander Liiker
98	GK	EST	Miron Vetkal
