= List of active football clubs in Estonia =

This list contains all active clubs in Estonia in 2017

== Main Teams ==
Team	League	County	Location	Stadium	Seating capacity	Main Team	2nd Main Team	3rd Main Team
Tallinna FC Flora	Meistriliiga	Harjumaa	Tallinn	A. Le Coq Arena	10,340			
FCI Tallinn	II Liiiga	Harjumaa	Tallinn	Infonet Lasnamäe Stadium	500			
Tallinna FC Levadia	Meistriliiga	Harjumaa	Tallinn	Kadriorg Stadium	5,000			
JK Narva Trans	Meistriliiga	Ida-Virumaa	Narva	Narva Kreenholmi Stadium	1,065			
Nõmme Kalju FC	Meistriliiga	Harjumaa	Tallinn	Hiiu Stadium	650			
Paide Linnameeskond	Meistriliiga	Järvamaa	Paide	Paide linnastaadion	268			
Pärnu JK Vaprus	Meistriliiga	Pärnumaa	Pärnu	Pärnu Rannastaadion	1,250			
JK Sillamäe Kalev	Meistriliiga	Ida-Virumaa	Sillamäe	Sillamäe Kalevi Stadium	800			
Tartu JK Tammeka	Meistriliiga	Tartumaa	Tartu	Tamme Stadium	1,500			
Viljandi JK Tulevik	Meistriliiga	Viljandimaa	Viljandi	Viljandi linnastaadion	1,084			
Rakvere JK Tarvas	Esiliiga	Lääne-Virumaa	Rakvere	Rakvere linnastaadion	1,829			
Maardu Linnameeskond	Esiliiga	Harjumaa	Maardu	Maardu linnastaadion	500			
Tartu FC Santos	Esiliiga	Tartumaa	Tartu	Tamme Stadium	1,500			
JK Tallinna Kalev	Esiliiga	Harjumaa	Tallinn	Kalevi Keskstaadion	11,500			
FCI Tallinn U21	Esiliiga	Harjumaa	Tallinn	Infonet Lasnamäe Stadium	500	Infonet		
Tallinna FC Levadia U21	Esiliiga	Harjumaa	Tallinn	Maarjamäe staadion		Levadia		
Tallinna FC Flora U21	Esiliiga	Harjumaa	Tallinn	Flora Lilleküla Stadium	200	Flora		
FC Elva	Esiliiga	Tartumaa	Elva	Elva linnastaadion	600			
FC Kuressaare	Esiliiga	Saaremaa	Kuressaare	Kuressaare linnastaadion	1,000			
Tartu JK Welco	Esiliiga	Tartumaa	Tartu	Tamme Stadium	1,500			
JK Vändra Vaprus	Esiliiga B	Pärnumaa	Vändra	Vändra Stadium	273	Vaprus		
Nõmme Kalju FC U21	Esiliiga B	Harjumaa	Tallinn	Hiiu Stadium	650	Kalju		
Paide Linnameeskond U21	Esiliiga B	Järvamaa	Paide	Paide linnastaadion	268	Paide LM		
Kohtla-Järve JK Järve	Esiliiga B	Ida-Virumaa	Kohtla-Järve	Kohtla-Järve Spordikeskuse staadion	780			
Raasiku FC Joker	Esiliiga B	Harjumaa	Raasiku	Raasiku Põhikooli kunstmuruväljak	200			
Tartu JK Tammeka U21	Esiliiga B	Tartumaa	Tartu	Sepa Stadium	508	Tammeka		
Viimsi JK	Esiliiga B	Harjumaa	Haabneeme	Viimsi KK Stadium	800			
JK Sillamäe Kalev U21	Esiliiga B	Ida-Virumaa	Sillamäe	Sillamäe Kalev artificial turf	300	Sillamäe		
JK Tallinna Kalev U21	Esiliiga B	Harjumaa	Tallinn	Kalevi Keskstaadioni kunstmuruväljak		Kalev		
Keila JK	Esiliiga B	Harjumaa	Keila	Keila staadioni muruväljak	500			
Tallinna JK Legion	II Liiga	Harjumaa	Tallinn	Wismari staadion				
Võru FC Helios	II Liiga	Võrumaa	Võru	Võru Spordikeskuse staadion				
Jõgeva SK Noorus-96	II Liiga	Jõgevamaa	Jõgeva	Jõgeva aleviku staadion	80			
Tartu FC Merkuur	II Liiga	Tartumaa	Tartu	Tartu Annelinna kunstmurustaadion				
Lasnamäe FC Ajax	II Liiga	Harjumaa	Tallinn	Ajaxi staadion				
Tallinna FC Levadia III	II Liiga	Harjumaa	Tallinn	Maarjamäe kunstmuruväljak		Levadia	Levadia U21	
Narva United	II Liiga	Ida-Virumaa	Narva	Narva Fama staadion	1,000			
Tallinna JK Piraaja	II Liiga	Harjumaa	Tallinn	Nike Arena				
Tallinna JK Dünamo	II Liiga	Harjumaa	Tallinn	Wismari staadion				
Maardu Linnameeskond II	II Liiga	Harjumaa	Maardu	Maardu kunstmuruväljak		Maardu LM		
Tartu FC Santos II	II Liiga	Tartumaa	Tartu	Tartu Tamme kunstmuruväljak		Santos		
Maardu United	II Liiga	Harjumaa	Maardu	Maardu kunstmuruväljak				
FC Ararat Tallinn	II Liiga	Harjumaa	Tallinn	Lasnamäe Spordikeskuse kunstmurustaadion	264			
Kohtla-Järve JK Järve II	II Liiga	Ida-Virumaa	Kohtla-Järve	Jõhvi linnastaadion		Järve		
FC Nõmme United	II Liiga	Harjumaa	Tallinn	Männiku staadion				
Pärnu JK	II Liiga	Pärnumaa	Pärnu	Pärnu Raeküla Stadium	500			
Saue JK Laagri	II Liiga	Harjumaa	Saue	Laagri kunstmurustaadion				
Viljandi JK Tulevik U21	II Liiga	Viljandimaa	Viljandi	Viljandi linnastaadion	1,084	Tulevik		
JK Tabasalu	II Liiga	Harjumaa	Tallinn	Männiku kunstmuruväljak	100			
JK Ganvix Türi	II Liiga	Järvamaa	Türi	Türi linnastaadion	2,000			
Raplamaa JK	II Liiga	Raplamaa	Rapla	Rapla Ühisgümnaasiumi staadion	150			
Tallinna FC Flora U19	II Liiga	Harjumaa	Tallinn	Sportland Arena	540	Flora	Flora U21	
FC Otepää	II Liiga	Valgamaa	Otepää	Tehvandi staadion	3,000			
FC Kuressaare II	II Liiga	Saaremaa	Kuressaare	Kuressaare kunstmurustaadion		Kuressaare		
Tõrva JK	II Liiga	Viljandimaa	Karksi-Nuia	Karksi-Nuia Gümnaasiumi staadion	80			
Pärnu JK Vaprus II	II Liiga	Pärnumaa	Pärnu	Pärnu kunstmurustaadion	200	Vaprus	Vändra	
SK Imavere	II Liiga	Järvamaa	Imavere	Imavere Stadium				
Viimsi JK II	II Liiga	Harjumaa	Haabneeme	Viimsi KK Stadium	800	Viimsi		
Põhja-Tallinna JK Volta	III Liiga	Harjumaa	Tallinn	Sõle jalgpalliväljak	150			
Tallinna FC Hell Hunt	III Liiga	Harjumaa	Tallinn	Kalevi Keskstaadioni kunstmuruväljak				
JK Tallinna Kalev III	III Liiga	Harjumaa	Tallinn	Kalevi Keskstaadioni kunstmuruväljak		Kalev	Kalev U21	
JK Retro	III Liiga	Harjumaa	Tallinn	EJL TNTK				
Tallinna FC Eston Villa	III Liiga	Harjumaa	Tallinn	Sõle jalgpalliväljak	150			
Rumori Calcio Tallinn	III Liiga	Harjumaa	Tallinn	Kalevi Keskstaadioni kunstmuruväljak				
Pirita Reliikvia	III Liiga	Harjumaa	Tallinn	Wismari staadion				
Harju JK Laagri	III Liiga	Harjumaa	Saue	Laagri kunstmurustaadion				
Saku Sporting	III Liiga	Harjumaa	Saku	Saku kunstmuruväljak				
Nõmme Kalju FC III	III Liiga	Harjumaa	Tallinn	Hiiu Stadium	650	Kalju	Kalju U21	
Kristiine JK	III Liiga	Harjumaa	Tallinn	Kalevi Keskstaadioni kunstmuruväljak				
Tallinna KSK FC Štrommi	III Liiga	Harjumaa	Tallinn	Wismari staadion		Dünamo		
Tartu JK Welco II	III Liiga	Tartumaa	Tartu	Tartu Annelinna kunstmurustaadion		Welco		
FC Tarvastu	III Liiga	Viljandimaa	Tarvastu	Soe keskasula staadion				
FC Vastseliina	III Liiga	Võrumaa	Vastseliina	Vastseliina Gümnaasiumi jalgpalliväljak				
SK Tääksi	III Liiga	Viljandimaa	Võhma	Võhma Gümnaasiumi staadion	500			
FC Tartu	III Liiga	Tartumaa	Ülenurme	Ülenurme staadion				
Tartu JK Tammeka U19	III Liiga	Tartumaa	Tartu	Tartu Sepa jalgpallikeskuse kunstmuruväljak	508	Tammeka	Tammeka U21	
Viljandi JK Tulevik III	III Liiga	Viljandimaa	Viljandi	Viljandi kunstmuruväljak	250	Tulevik	Tulevik U21	
FC Jõgeva Wolves	III Liiga	Jõgevamaa	Jõgeva	Jõgeva linnastaadion				
Suure-Jaani United	III Liiga	Viljandimaa	Suure-Jaani	Suure-Jaani Gümnaasiumi staadion	45			
EMÜ SK	III Liiga	Tartumaa	Ülenurme	Ülenurme staadion				
Tartu Ülikool Fauna	III Liiga	Tartumaa	Mäksa	Kaagvere staadion				
Navi Vutiselts	III Liiga	Võrumaa	Väimela	Väimela staadion				
Paide Linnameeskond III	III Liiga	Järvamaa	Paide	Paide linnastaadion	268	Paide LM	Paide LM U21	
FCI Tallinn III	III Liiga	Harjumaa	Tallinn	Infoneti Lasnamäe staadion	500	FCI	FCI U21	
JK Väätsa Vald	III Liiga	Järvamaa	Paide	Paide kunstmuruväljak				
FC Järva-Jaani	III Liiga	Järvamaa	Järva-Jaani	Järva-Jaani Kasekopli staadion	600			
Raasiku FC Joker II	III Liiga	Harjumaa	Raasiku	Raasiku Põhikooli kunstmuruväljak	200	Joker		
Koeru JK	III Liiga	Järvamaa	Koeru	Koeru staadion				
Ambla Vallameeskond	III Liiga	Järvamaa	Ambla	Ambla Koolistaadion		Tarvas		
JK Loo	III Liiga	Harjumaa	Loo	Loo kunstmuruväljak				
Kuusalu JK Rada	III Liiga	Harjumaa	Kuusalu	Kuusalu Keskkooli staadion	150			
FC Helios Tartu	III Liiga	Tartumaa	Tartu	Tartu Tamme kunstmuruväljak				
Lasnamäe FC Ajax II	III Liiga	Harjumaa	Tallinn	Ajaxi kunstmuruväljak	500	Ajax		
Tallinna JK Augur	III Liiga	Harjumaa	Keila	Keila staadioni kunstmuruväljak	500			
Pärnu JK Poseidon	III Liiga	Pärnumaa	Pärnu	Pärnu kunstmurustaadion	200			
Tallinna FC Castovanni Eagles	III Liiga	Harjumaa	Tallinn	Sportland Arena	540			
Lihula JK	III Liiga	Läänemaa	Lihula	Lihula kooli staadion				
Kärdla Linnameeskond	III Liiga	Hiiumaa	Kärdla	Kärdla linnastaadion				
Läänemaa JK	III Liiga	Läänemaa	Haapsalu	Haapsalu linnastaadion				
FC Zenit Tallinn	III Liiga	Harjumaa	Kernu	Kernu Põhikooli staadion	100			
Rummu Dünamo	III Liiga	Harjumaa	Vasalemma	Vasalemma Põhikooli staadion				
FC Kose	III Liiga	Harjumaa	Kose	Oru Põhikooli staadion				
JK Kernu Kadakas	III Liiga	Harjumaa	Kernu	Kernu Põhikooli staadion	100			
FC Lelle	III Liiga	Raplamaa	Lelle	Lelle staadion				
Raplamaa JK II	III Liiga	Raplamaa	Märjamaa	Märjamaa Gümnaasiumi staadion		Raplamaa		
Pakri SK Alexela	III Liiga	Harjumaa	Paldiski	Alexela Arena	200			
Tallinna FC Zapoos	IV Liiga	Harjumaa	Tallinn	Kalevi Keskstaadioni kunstmuruväljak				
Tallinna Depoo	IV Liiga	Harjumaa	Loo	Loo kunstmuruväljak		Loo		
Tallinna FC Olympic Olybet	IV Liiga	Harjumaa	Tallinn	Nike Arena				
Anija JK	IV Liiga	Harjumaa	Kehra	Kehra kunstmurustaadion	1,000			
Tallinna JK Piraaja II	IV Liiga	Harjumaa	Tallinn	Nike Arena		Piraaja		
FC Maardu Aliens	IV Liiga	Harjumaa	Maardu	Maardu kunstmuruväljak		Maardu U.		
Rakvere JK Tarvas II	III Liiga	Lääne-Virumaa	Rakvere	Rakvere kunstmurustaadion		Tarvas		
Tallinna JK Jalgpallihaigla	IV Liiga	Harjumaa	Tallinn	Hiiu Stadium	650			
Haapsalu JK	IV Liiga	Läänemaa	Haapsalu	Haapsalu kunstmuruväljak				
Kohila Püsivus	IV Liiga	Raplamaa	Kohila	Kohila staadion				
Tallinna FC Soccernet	IV Liiga	Harjumaa	Tallinn	Wismari staadion				
Maarjamäe FC Igiliikur	IV Liiga	Harjumaa	Tallinn	Maarjamäe kunstmuruväljak				
Tallinna FC Transferwise	IV Liiga	Harjumaa	Tallinn	Kalevi Keskstaadioni kunstmuruväljak				
FC Toompea	IV Liiga	Harjumaa	Tallinn	Wismari staadion				
Keila JK II	IV Liiga	Harjumaa	Keila	Keila staadioni kunstmuruväljak	500	Keila		
Põhja-Tallinna JK Volta II	IV Liiga	Harjumaa	Tallinn	Sõle jalgpalliväljak	150	Volta		
Tallinna FC Reaal	IV Liiga	Harjumaa	Tallinn	Kalevi Keskstaadioni kunstmuruväljak				
Tallinna Majandusmagistri Jalgpalliselts	IV Liiga	Harjumaa	Tallinn	Lasnamäe Spordikeskuse kunstmurustaadion	264			
Valga FC Warrior	IV Liiga	Valgamaa	Valga	Valga linnastaadion				
Võru FC Helios II	IV Liiga	Võrumaa	Väimela	Väimela staadion		Helios		
Pärnu JK Poseidon II	IV Liiga	Pärnumaa	Pärnu	Pärnu kunstmurustaadion	200	Poseidon		
FC Elva II	IV Liiga	Tartumaa	Elva	Elva linnastaadion	600	Elva		
Põlva FC Lootos	IV Liiga	Põlvamaa	Põlva	Lootospark	600			
FCP Pärnu	IV Liiga	Pärnumaa	Pärnu	Pärnu kunstmurustaadion	200			
FC Jõgeva Wolves II	IV Liiga	Jõgevamaa	Jõgeva	Jõgeva linnastaadion		Wolves		
Viljandi JK Tulevik IV	IV Liiga	Viljandimaa	Viljandi	Viljandi kunstmuruväljak	250	Tulevik	Tulevik U21	Tulevik III
Tõrva JK II	IV Liiga	Valgamaa	Tõrva	Tõrva Noortekeskuse väljak		Tõrva		

== See also ==
- List of football clubs in Estonia
