= Ken Kallaste =

Estonian footballer

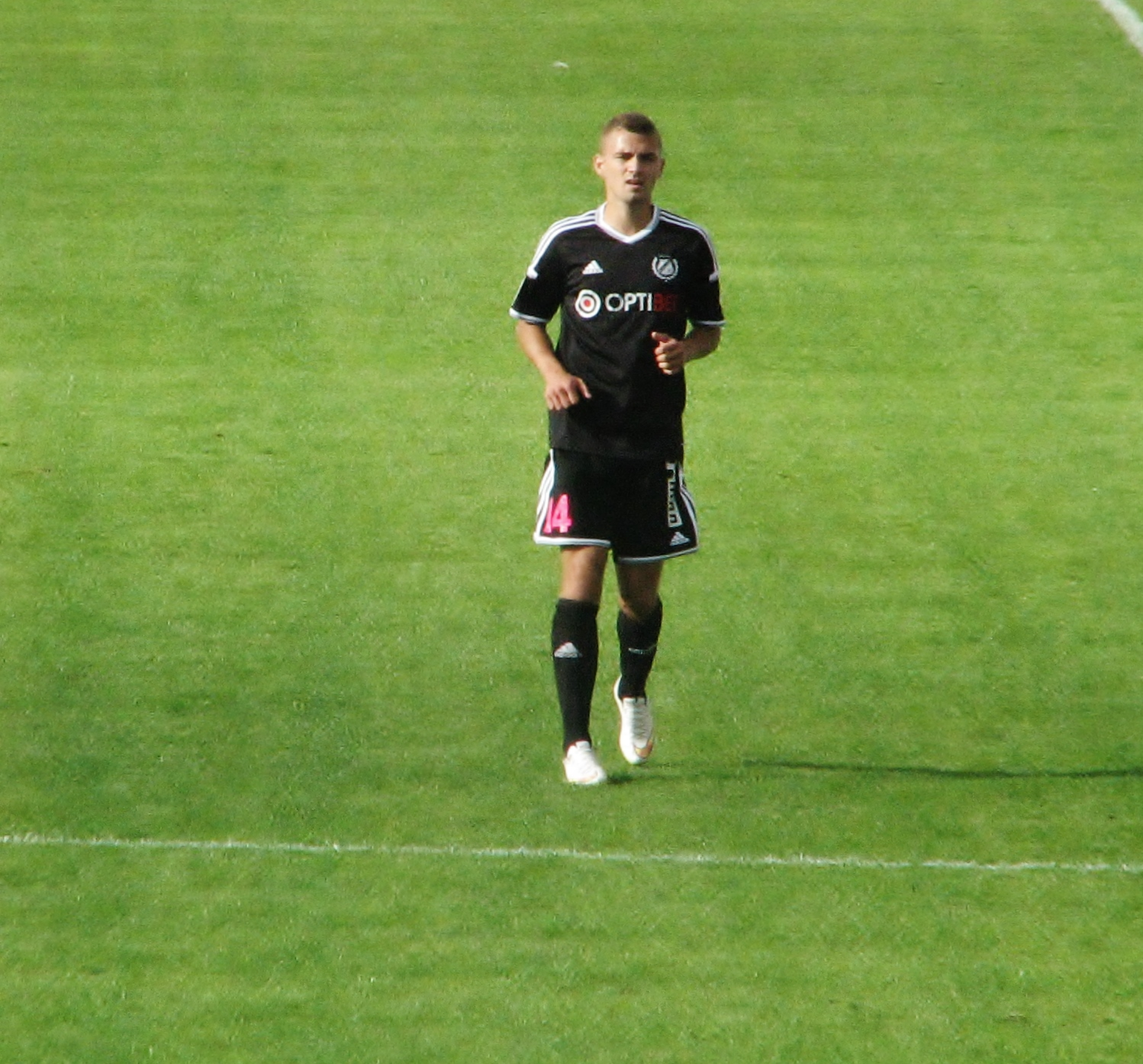
- Kallaste with Nõmme Kalju in 2015

Personal information
- Full name: Ken Kallaste
- Date of birth: 31 August 1988 (age 38)
- Place of birth: Tallinn, then part of Estonian SSR, Soviet Union
- Height: 1.82 m (5 ft 11 1/2 in)
- Position: Left back

Youth career
- –2005: Flora

Senior career*
Years	Team	Apps	(Gls)
2004	Lelle	22	(4)
2004–2005	Tervis Pärnu	32	(4)
2006	Warrior	16	(4)
2006–2009	Flora	36	(2)
2006–2009	Flora II	62	(21)
2008	→ Tulevik (loan)	14	(0)
2010–2015	Nõmme Kalju	213	(16)
2010	Nõmme Kalju II	1	(1)
2015–2016	Górnik Zabrze	15	(0)
2016–2019	Korona Kielce	67	(2)
2017–2019	Korona Kielce II	15	(0)
2019–2020	GKS Tychy	8	(0)
2020–2023	Flora	58	(12)
2024–2025	Levadia	13	(1)

International career
2004	Estonia U17	5	(0)
2005	Estonia U18	1	(0)
2006	Estonia U19	3	(1)
2007–2010	Estonia U21	17	(2)
2010–2012	Estonia U23	5	(0)
2012–2024	Estonia	61	(0)
- * Club domestic league appearances and goals

Ken Kallaste (né Akerta; born 31 August 1988) is an Estonian retired professional footballer who played as a left back.

== Club career ==
=== Flora ===
Kallaste came through the Flora youth system. He made his debut in the Meistriliiga playing for Flora affiliated Warrior on 12 March 2006, in a 0–6 away loss to Maag Tartu. In July 2006, Kallaste moved to Flora's first team. He made his debut for the club on 9 July 2006, in a 0–1 home loss to Levadia.

In July 2008, Kallaste joined Tulevik on loan until the end of the season.

=== Nõmme Kalju ===
On 6 January 2010, Kallaste signed a three-year contract with Nõmme Kalju. He made his debut for the club on 9 March 2010, in 1–0 home victory over Tulevik. Kallaste helped Nõmme Kalju win the Meistriliiga title in 2012. From 8 May 2010 to 20 July 2013, Kallaste played every single minute of 116 consecutive league matches, earning himself the nickname Raudmees (Iron Man).

=== Górnik Zabrze ===
On 22 December 2015, Kallaste signed for Polish club Górnik Zabrze on a one-and-a-half-year deal, with an option to extend the contract for another year. He made his debut in the Ekstraklasa on 13 February 2016, in a 0–3 away loss to Cracovia. Górnik Zabrze were relegated at the end of the 2015–16 season and on 25 June 2016, Kallaste was released from his contract by mutual consent.

=== Korona Kielce ===
On 27 June 2016, Kallaste signed a two-year contract with Korona Kielce. He made his debut for the club on 17 August 2016, in a 0–4 away loss to Zagłębie Lubin. Kallaste scored his first Ekstraklasa goal on 25 November 2017, in a 3–2 home win over Legia Warsaw.

=== GKS Tychy ===
On 17 June 2019, Kallaste signed for I liga side GKS Tychy on a one-year deal, with an option to extend his contract for another year.

== International career ==
Kallaste has represented Estonia at under-17, under-18, under-19, under-21 and under-23 levels.

On 1 November 2012, Kallaste was named in Estonia's squad for a friendly match against Oman on 8 November 2012, and made his senior international debut in the 2–1 away win.

== Personal life ==
Kallaste was born Ken Akerta, but changed his last name to Kallaste in 2006. He is the son of former professional footballer and Estonian international Risto Kallaste.

Kallaste has a daughter (born 2012).

== Career statistics ==
=== Club ===
As of 17 June 2019.

Appearances and goals by club, season and competition
Club	Season	League			Cup (Note: Includes the Estonian Cup and Polish Cup)		Europe		Other		Total	
Club	Season	Division	Apps	Goals	Apps	Goals	Apps	Goals	Apps	Goals	Apps	Goals
Lelle	2004	II liiga	22	4	0	0	—		—		22	4
Tervis Pärnu	2004	Esiliiga	3	1	1	0	—		—		4	1
Tervis Pärnu	2005	Esiliiga	29	3	1	0	—		—		30	3
Tervis Pärnu	Total		32	4	2	0	—		—		34	4
Warrior	2006	Meistriliiga	16	4	1	1	—		—		17	5
Flora	2006	Meistriliiga	10	0	1	2	3 (Note: Appearances in UEFA Cup/UEFA Europa League)	0	1 (Note: Appearance in Estonian Supercup)	0	15	2
Flora	2007	Meistriliiga	0	0	0	0	0	0	1 (Note: Appearance(s) in Baltic League)	0	1	0
Flora	2008	Meistriliiga	3	1	0	0	0	0	3	0	6	1
Flora	2009	Meistriliiga	23	1	1	0	2	0	1	0	27	1
Flora	Total		36	2	2	2	5	0	6	0	49	4
Flora II	2006	Esiliiga	6	5	0	0	—		—		6	5
Flora II	2007	Esiliiga	31	9	3	1	—		—		34	10
Flora II	2008	Esiliiga	16	3	2	1	—		—		18	4
Flora II	2009	Esiliiga	9	4	0	0	—		—		9	4
Flora II	Total		62	21	5	2	—		—		67	23
Tulevik (loan)	2008	Meistriliiga	14	0	3	2	—		—		17	2
Nõmme Kalju	2010	Meistriliiga	35	4	3	0	—		2	0	40	4
Nõmme Kalju	2011	Meistriliiga	36	2	2	0	2	0	—		40	2
Nõmme Kalju	2012	Meistriliiga	36	1	4	0	2	0	—		42	1
Nõmme Kalju	2013	Meistriliiga	36	2	6	1	6 (Note: Four appearances in UEFA Champions League, two appearances in UEFA Europa League)	0	1	0	49	3
Nõmme Kalju	2014	Meistriliiga	35	4	0	0	4	0	—		39	4
Nõmme Kalju	2015	Meistriliiga	35	3	4	1	4	0	—		43	4
Nõmme Kalju	Total		213	16	19	2	18	0	3	0	253	18
Nõmme Kalju II	2010	II liiga	1	1	0	0	—		—		1	1
Górnik Zabrze	2015–16	Ekstraklasa	15	0	0	0	—		—		15	0
Korona Kielce	2016–17	Ekstraklasa	24	0	0	0	—		—		24	0
Korona Kielce	2017–18	Ekstraklasa	31	1	4	0	—		—		35	1
Korona Kielce	2018–19	Ekstraklasa	12	1	1	0	—		—		13	1
Korona Kielce	Total		67	2	5	0	—		—		72	2
Korona Kielce II	2016–17	IV liga	1	0	—		—		—		1	0
Korona Kielce II	2018–19	IV liga	14	0	—		—		—		14	0
Korona Kielce II	Total		15	0	—		—		—		15	0
Career total			493	54	37	9	23	0	9	0	562	63

=== International ===
As of 20 August 2019.

Appearances and goals by national team and year
National team	Year	Apps	Goals
Estonia	2012	1	0
Estonia	2013	1	0
Estonia	2014	10	0
Estonia	2015	10	0
Estonia	2016	10	0
Estonia	2017	5	0
Estonia	2018	4	0
Total		41	0

== Honours ==
Flora

- Meistriliiga: 2020, 2022, 2023
- Estonian Cup: 2008–09
- Estonian Supercup: 2009

Nõmme Kalju

- Meistriliiga: 2012
- Estonian Cup: 2014–15

Levadia

- Meistriliiga: 2024
- Estonian Cup: 2023–24

Korona Kielce II

- IV liga Świętokrzyskie: 2018–19

Individual

- Meistriliiga Player of the Month: March 2015, October 2021
