= List of football clubs in Estonia =

The following is a list of football clubs in Estonia.

== # ==
- 1188 Infoabi

== A ==
- FC A&A Kinnisvara
- FC ABB
- FC Abja
- FC Ahtamar Tallinn
- Ajax Lasnamäe
- PSK Alexela
- Ambla Vallameeskond
- FC Ararat Tallinn
- FC Aspen
- FC Atletik Tallinn
- JK Atli Rapla

== B ==
- FC Balteco
- FC Bestra

== C ==
- Castovanni Eagles
- Charma Tabasalu
- FC Comwell
- FC Concordia Audentes Tallinn

== D ==
- FC DAG Tartu (DAG Tartu)
- JK Dagöplast Emmaste
- SK Dvigatel

== E ==
- FC EBS Team
- Eesti Koondis
- JK Eesti Põlevkivi Jõhvi
- FC Elva
- Hiiumaa ÜJK Emmaste
- EMÜ SK
- FC Energia
- Spordiselts ESDAG Tartu
- F.C.A. Estel Tallinn
- Esteve Maardu
- FC Eston Villa
- JS Estonia Tallinn
- EVL United

== F ==
- FC Flora Järva-Jaani
- FC Flora Kehtna
- FC Flora Tallinn
- FC Flora II Tallinn
- FC Flora (women)
- Fortuna Tallinn

== G ==
- FC Goll
- WC Guwalda Pärnu

== H ==
- FC Haiba
- FC Hansa United
- FC HansaNet.ee
- Harju JK Laagri
- FC HaServ Tartu
- FC Hiiu Kalur Kärdla
- FC Hell Hunt

== I ==
- FC Igiliikur Viimsi
- SK Imavere
- Infonet Tallinn
- Infonet II Tallinn
- International

== J ==
- JK Jalgpallihaigla
- FC Joker Raasiku
- FC Jüri

== K ==
- JK Kadakas Kernu
- JK Kaitseliit Kalev
- Kalevi SK Pärnu
- JK Karksi
- Keemik Kohtla-Järve
- Kehra JK Piraaja
- Keila JK
- Keskerakonna JK
- Kick Sai Narva
- FC Kiiu
- SK Kirm
- Koeru SK
- Kohtla-Järve JK Alko
- Kohtla-Järve FC Lootus
- Kohtla-Järve JK Järve
- Kose
- JK Kotkad Tallinn
- JK Kotkad Viljandi
- Kristiine JK
- KSKM Tallinn
- Kuressaare
- Kuressaare II
- FC Kuristiku
- Kuusalu JK Rada
- Rahvaspordiklubi Kuuse
- Kärdla Linnameeskond

== L ==
- Laagri Saue
- FC Lantana Tallinn
- Legion Tallinn
- FC Lelle
- SK Lemons
- FC Levadia Maardu
- FC Levadia Pärnu
- FC Levadia Tallinn
- FC Levadia II Tallinn
- FC Levadia III
- FC Levadia Tallinn (women)
- Lihula JK
- LiVal Sport Tallinn
- JK Liverpool Pub
- Lokomotiv Jõhvi
- Loksa Rahvaspordiklubi
- JK Loo
- FC Lootos Põlva
- FC Lootos Põlva (women)
- FC Lootus Alutaguse
- FC Lootus Kohtla-Järve
- LNSK Pantrid Tallinn
- Luunja
- Lõuna-Läänemaa JK
- Läänemaa JK
- JK Löök Tartu

== M ==
- FC Maardu
- Maardu Linnameeskond
- Maardu United
- FC Majandusmagister
- FC M.C. Tallinn
- SK Mercury Tallinn
- FC Metec Tartu
- FC Meteor Tallinn
- Metropool Pärnu
- FC Mets&Puu
- JK Minevik
- Muhumaa JK
- FC Mõigu-Rae
- Märjamaa Kompanii

== N ==
- Narva Trans
- Narva United FC
- Navi Vutiselts
- FC Nikol Tallinn
- Noorus 96 Jõgeva
- Noortekoondis (women)
- FC Norma Tallinn
- Nõmme Kalju FC
- Nõmme Kalju FC U21
- Nõmme United
- Unibet/Nõmme Kalju

== O ==
- Olympic Olybet Tallinn
- Operi Jalgpallikool
- FC Otepää

== P ==
- Paide Linnameeskond
- Paide Linnameeskond II
- Pakri SK
- Pärnu Bussipark
- Pärnu Jalgpalliklubi
- Pärnu JK
- Pärnu Kalev
- Pärnu JK Poseidon
- Pärnu Kalakombinaat/MEK
- KEK Pärnu
- Pärnu Linnameeskond
- Pärnu Linnameeskond II
- Piraaja Tallinn
- Pirita JK Reliikvia
- FC Puuma
- Põhja-Sakala
- Põhja-Tallinna JK
- Põhja-Tallinna JK Volta
- JK Püsivus Kohila

== Q ==
- FC Q United
- Quattromed Tartu

== R ==
- Raasiku FC Joker
- Rakvere Kalev
- Rakvere JK Tarvas
- FC Reaal Tallinn
- S.C. Real Maardu
- S.C. Real Tallinn (SC Real Tallinn, Tallinna SC Real)
- S.C. Real/Triobet (beach soccer?)
- JK Reliikvia Pirita
- JK Retro
- FC Risti
- JK Rock & Roll
- Räpina SK
- Rummu Dünamo

== S ==
- Saaremaa JK
- SaareMaa JK aaMeraaS
- Saku JK
- FC Santos Tartu
- Saue JK
- Sillamäe Kalev
- 1. detsember Sindi
- SK 10 Premium Tartu
- FC Soccernet
- FC Spiritas
- JK Sport Põltsamaa

== Š ==
- FC Štrommi Tallinn

== T ==
- JK Tabasalu
- Tabasalu JK
- FC Tabivere
- JK Tajak
- Tallinn C.F.
- Tallinna JS Estonia
- Tallinna Jalgpalliklubi
- Tallinna JK Augur
- Tallinna JK Dünamo
- Tallinna JK Legion
- Tallinna Kalev
- Tallinna Kalev (women)
- Tallinna Kuradid
- Tallinna Lõvid
- Tallinna Puhkekodu
- Tallinna Sadam
- Tallinna Sport
- SVSM Tallinn
- Tallinna Ülikool
- Tallinna FC Zapoos
- SK Tamme Auto Kiviõli
- Kiviõli Tamme Auto II
- SK Tapa
- Tartu JK Tammeka
- Tartu JK Tammeka (women)
- Tartu PK Olümpia
- Tartu Ülikool Fauna
- Tartu FC Merkuur
- Tartu JK Merkuur
- FC Tarvastu
- Tempo Tallinn
- JK Tervis Pärnu
- FC Tevalte
- TJK-83 Tallinn
- Tondi
- FC Toompea
- FC Toompea 1994
- Tõrva
- Järvakandi JK Tribling
- Trummi SK
- Tulevik Viljandi
- Tulevik II Viljandi
- Turba NJK
- FC TVMK Tallinn
- FC Twister Tallinn
- SK Tääksi
- T.F.T. Töfting
- Türi Ganvix

== V ==
- FC Valga
- JK Vall Tallinn (Vall Tallinn)
- FC Vaprus Pärnu
- JK Vaprus Vändra
- FC Vastseliina
- FC Velldoris
- KSK Vigri Tallinn
- Viimsi JK
- Viimsi MRJK
- Viljandi
- Viljandi PT
- JK Voka
- Võhma Linnameeskond
- KS Võitleja Narva
- JK Võru
- Võru FC Helios

== W ==
- Warrior Tõrva
- Warrior Valga
- Welco Tartu

== Ü ==
- FC Ühinenud Depood

== See also ==
- List of active football clubs in Estonia
