= 2025 Meistriliiga =

Meistriliiga
- Season: 2025
- Dates: 28 February 2025 – 8 November 2025
- Champions: Flora (16th title)
- Relegated: Tallinna Kalev
- Champions League: Flora
- Conference League: FCI Levadia; Nõmme Kalju; Paide Linnameeskond
- Matches: 180
- Goals: 572 (3.18 per match)
- Top goalscorer: Rauno Sappinen (21 goals)
- Biggest home win: Vaprus 8–1 Tammeka (15 August 2025)
- Biggest away win: Tallinna Kalev 0–9 FCI Levadia (19 April 2025)
- Highest scoring: Tallinna Kalev 0–9 FCI Levadia (19 April 2025); Vaprus 8–1 Tammeka (15 August 2025)
- Longest winning run: 9 matches FCI Levadia
- Longest unbeaten run: 12 matches Nõmme Kalju
- Longest winless run: 15 matches Tallinna Kalev
- Longest losing run: 12 matches Tallinna Kalev
- Highest attendance: 1,687; Flora 1–0 FCI Levadia (18 May 2025)
- Lowest attendance: 85; Kuressaare 1–2 Harju (16 March 2025)
- Total attendance: 67,762
- Average attendance: 376

The 2025 Meistriliiga, also known as A. Le Coq Premium Liiga due to sponsorship reasons, was the 35th season of the Meistriliiga, the top Estonian league for association football clubs since its establishment in 1992. The season began on 28 February 2025 and concluded on 8 November.

== Teams ==
The league consisted of ten teams; the top nine teams of the previous season, and one team promoted from the Esiliiga. FCI Levadia entered the season as defending champions.

The promoted team was the 2024 Esiliiga champions Harju. They replaced the bottom-placed 2024 Meistriliiga side Nõmme United.

=== Stadiums and locations ===
Locations of the 2025 Meistriliiga teams
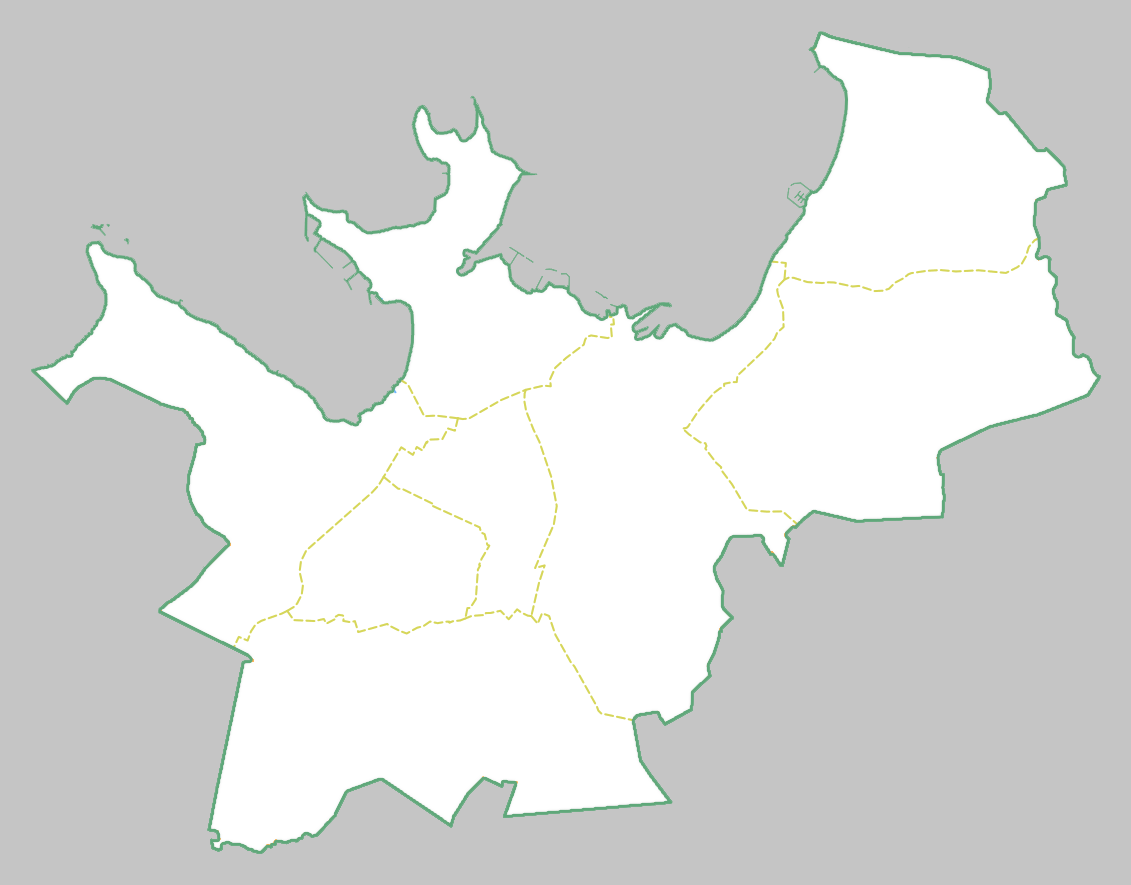
Locations of the 2025 Meistriliiga teams in Tallinn

Team	Location	Stadium	Capacity
FCI Levadia	Tallinn	A. Le Coq Arena	14,336
Flora	Tallinn	A. Le Coq Arena	14,336
Harju	Laagri	Laagri Stadium	500
Kuressaare	Kuressaare	Kuressaare linnastaadion	1,000
Narva Trans	Narva	Kalev-Fama Stadium	1,000
Nõmme Kalju	Tallinn	Hiiu Stadium	570
Paide Linnameeskond	Paide	Paide linnastaadion	500
Tallinna Kalev	Tallinn	Kadriorg Stadium	5,000
Tammeka	Tartu	Tamme Stadium	1,750
Vaprus	Pärnu	Pärnu Rannastaadion	1,501

=== Personnel and kits ===
Team	Manager	Captain	Kit manufacturer	Shirt sponsor
FCI Levadia	(Spain) Curro Torres	(Estonia) Rasmus Peetson	Macron	Viimsi Keevitus
Flora	(Estonia) Konstantin Vassiljev	(Estonia) Rauno Alliku	Nike	Optibet
Harju	(Estonia) Lauri Nuuma	(Estonia) Andres Järve	Adidas	None
Kuressaare	(Estonia) Sander Post	(Estonia) Märten Pajunurm	Nike	Visit Saaremaa
Narva Trans	(Ukraine) Roman Kozhukhovskyi	(Ivory Coast) Irié	Nike	Sportland
Nõmme Kalju	(Russia) Nikita Andreev	(Estonia) Henri Perk	Adidas	Marsbet
Paide Linnameeskond	(Estonia) Vladimir Vassiljev	(Estonia) Henrik Ojamaa	Capelli	Verston
Tallinna Kalev	(Estonia) Alo Bärengrub	(Estonia) Vadim Mihhailov	Macron	Unibet
Tammeka	(Estonia) Siim Valtna (interim)	(Estonia) Richard Aland	Nike	Livida
Vaprus	(Estonia) Igor Prins	(Estonia) Magnus Villota	Nike	Coolbet

=== Managerial changes ===
Team	Outgoing manager	Manner of departure	Date of vacancy	Position in the table	Incoming manager	Date of appointment
Harju	(Portugal) Victor Silva	End of contract	22 November 2024	Pre-season	(Estonia) Lauri Nuuma	29 November 2024
Kuressaare	(Ukraine) Roman Kozhukhovskyi	End of contract	23 November 2024	Pre-season	(Estonia) Sander Post	1 January 2025
Flora	(Estonia) Taavi Viik	Mutual consent	25 November 2024	Pre-season	(Estonia) Konstantin Vassiljev	25 November 2024
Narva Trans	(Portugal) Ricardo Afonso	End of interim spell	4 December 2024	Pre-season	(Ukraine) Roman Kozhukhovskyi	31 December 2024
Tammeka	(Estonia) Marti Pähn	Contract terminated	20 April 2025	9th	(Estonia) Siim Valtna (interim)	20 April 2025
Tallinna Kalev	(Finland) Teemu Tainio	Resigned	24 April 2025	10th	(Estonia) Alo Bärengrub	24 April 2025
Paide Linnameeskond	(Serbia) Ivan Stojković	Sacked	19 May 2025	4th	(Estonia) Tarmo Kink (Estonia) Ats Sillaste (interim)	19 May 2025
Paide Linnameeskond	(Estonia) Tarmo Kink (Estonia) Ats Sillaste	End of interim spell	25 May 2025	5th	(Estonia) Vladimir Vassiljev	25 May 2025

== League table ==
Pos	Team	Pld	W	D	L	GF	GA	GD	Pts	Qualification or relegation
1	Flora (C)	36	26	4	6	84	31	+53	82	Qualification for the Champions League first qualifying round
2	FCI Levadia	36	25	4	7	89	36	+53	79	Qualification for the Conference League first qualifying round (Note: Since the 2025–26 Estonian Cup winners, Flora, qualified for the Champions League via league position, the Conference League spot awarded to the cup winners was passed to the fourth-placed team.)
3	Nõmme Kalju	36	23	5	8	69	37	+32	74	Qualification for the Conference League first qualifying round
4	Paide Linnameeskond	36	21	7	8	63	32	+31	70	Qualification for the Conference League first qualifying round
5	Narva Trans	36	15	6	15	53	52	+1	51	
6	Vaprus	36	14	7	15	54	51	+3	49	
7	Harju	36	10	6	20	49	70	−21	36	
8	Tammeka	36	9	3	24	47	83	−36	30	
9	Kuressaare (O)	36	8	4	24	32	67	−35	28	Qualification for the Meistriliiga play-off
10	Tallinna Kalev (R)	36	5	2	29	32	113	−81	17	Relegation to the Esiliiga

Source: Premium Liiga
Rules for classification: 1) Points; 2) Less matches awarded against; 3) Head-to-head points; 4) Head-to-head goal difference; 5) Matches won; 6) Goal difference; 7) Goals scored; 8) Away goals scored; 9) Fair-play points; 10) Draw
(C) Champions; (O) Play-off winners; (R) Relegated

== Results ==
Teams face each other four times (twice at home and twice away).

Home \ Away	FCI	FLO	HAR	KUR	NAR	NÕK	PLM	TAK	TAM	VAP
FCI Levadia		0–0	5–0	2–1	2–1	2–1	2–1	4–0	4–0	2–2
FCI Levadia		1–3	3–0	2–0	3–1	3–1	1–2	3–1	3–0	1–3
Flora	1–0		4–1	5–0	2–2	2–3	1–0	3–1	3–1	0–1
Flora	2–3		3–1	2–0	4–0	1–0	1–2	6–0	2–1	3–0
Harju	0–1	0–3		1–1	0–3	2–3	1–2	2–0	4–1	0–1
Harju	2–2	1–2		2–1	1–0	1–3	3–0	4–1	2–2	1–2
Kuressaare	1–2	1–3	1–2		2–1	0–2	1–2	2–0	2–3	1–0
Kuressaare	0–3	1–2	1–3		0–0	0–1	1–1	2–1	0–2	2–1
Narva Trans	0–1	1–2	4–2	0–2		1–2	1–0	1–0	4–0	4–2
Narva Trans	0–4	1–1	1–3	3–2		0–0	2–3	2–0	4–1	1–1
Nõmme Kalju	2–0	1–2	3–0	4–0	2–0		0–2	6–1	2–2	1–2
Nõmme Kalju	2–1	3–1	1–0	2–0	1–2		1–1	6–2	2–1	1–0
Paide Linnameeskond	2–1	2–1	2–2	1–1	0–1	4–0		5–0	1–0	1–0
Paide Linnameeskond	0–3	1–1	2–0	5–1	2–0	1–1		2–2	5–0	3–0
Tallinna Kalev	0–9	0–4	1–3	4–1	2–5	0–1	1–0		1–2	0–3
Tallinna Kalev	1–6	0–4	3–1	2–1	1–3	0–2	0–3		3–2	0–2
Tammeka	2–3	1–2	2–1	1–0	1–2	0–1	0–2	5–0		0–5
Tammeka	2–2	1–2	3–0	0–1	2–0	1–3	0–1	5–2		1–4
Vaprus	1–2	0–3	1–1	2–1	1–2	0–3	1–2	2–2	2–1	
Vaprus	1–3	0–3	2–2	0–1	0–0	2–2	1–0	1–0	8–1	

Source: Soccerway
Legend: Blue = home team win; Yellow = draw; Red = away team win.

== Meistriliiga play-off ==
The ninth-placed team (Kuressaare) faced the second-placed team of the 2025 Esiliiga (Viimsi) in a two-legged play-off for the final place in the 2026 Meistriliiga.

=== First leg ===
22 November 2025	Viimsi	0–1	Kuressaare	Haabneeme
10:30 BST		Report	Demidov 55'	Stadium: Viimsi Stadium; Attendance: 811; Referee: Kristo Tohver

=== Second leg ===
29 November 2025	Kuressaare	2–0	Viimsi	Kuressaare
10:30 BST	Kivi 68', 75'	Report		Stadium: Kuressaare kunstmurustaadion Attendance: 275; Referee: Joonas Jaanovits

Kuressaare won 3–0 on aggregate.

== Season statistics ==
=== Top scorers ===
Rank	Player	Club	Goals
1	(Estonia) Rauno Sappinen	Flora	21
2	(Estonia) Marten-Chris Paalberg	Vaprus	15
3	(Estonia) Karel Eerme	Harju	13
3	(Estonia) Taaniel Usta	Tallinna Kalev	13
5	(Burkina Faso) Pierre Landry Kaboré	Narva Trans	12
6	(Nigeria) Ahmed Adebayo	Tammeka	11
7	(Ghana) Ernest Agyiri	FCI Levadia	10
7	(Estonia) Mihkel Ainsalu	FCI Levadia	10
7	(Togo) Josué Doké	Narva Trans	10
7	(Estonia) Markus Poom	Flora	10

=== Top assists ===
Rank	Player	Club	Assists
1	(Estonia) Nikita Ivanov	Nõmme Kalju	14
2	(Brazil) Guilherme Smith	Nõmme Kalju	11
3	(Estonia) Markus Poom	Flora	10
4	(Estonia) Mark Oliver Roosnupp	FCI Levadia	9
5	(Ghana) Ernest Agyiri	FCI Levadia	8
5	(Estonia) Michael Schjønning-Larsen	FCI Levadia	8
5	(Estonia) Tristan Pajo	Vaprus	8
5	(Estonia) Nikita Mihhailov	Flora	8
5	(Estonia) Mark Maksimkin	Narva Trans	8
10	(Estonia) Tristan Koskor	Tammeka	7
10	(Estonia) Martin Miller	Paide	7
10	(Estonia) Kristo Hussar	Flora	7
10	(Estonia) Daniil Tarassenkov	Nõmme Kalju	7

=== Hat-tricks ===
Player	For	Against	Result	Date
(Estonia) Karel Eerme	Harju	Tammeka	4–1 (H)	18 April 2025
(Burkina Faso) Pierre Landry Kaboré	Narva Trans	Tammeka	4–0 (H)	3 May 2025
(Burkina Faso) Pierre Landry Kaboré	Narva Trans	Vaprus	4–2 (H)	11 May 2025
(Togo) Josué Doké	Narva Trans	Harju	4–2 (H)	27 May 2025
(Brazil) João Pedro	FCI Levadia	Tallinna Kalev	6–1 (A)	17 August 2025
(Estonia) Marten-Chris Paalberg	Vaprus	Tammeka	4–1 (A)	16 September 2025
(Estonia) Rauno Sappinen	Flora	Narva Trans	4–0 (H)	21 October 2025
(Estonia) Kristofer Piht	Harju	Tallinna Kalev	4–1 (H)	2 November 2025

=== Clean sheets ===
Rank	Player	Club	Clean sheets
1	(Estonia) Karl Andre Vallner	FCI Levadia	11
2	(Russia) Maksim Pavlov	Nõmme Kalju	9
3	(The Gambia) Ebrima Jarju	Paide Linnameeskond	8
3	(Estonia) Ott Nõmm	Vaprus	8
5	(Estonia) Evert Grünvald	Flora	7
5	(Estonia) Kaur Kivila	Flora	7
5	(Estonia) Aleksei Matrossov	Narva Trans	7
8	(Estonia) Karl-Romet Nõmm	Kuressaare	6
9	(Estonia) Henri Perk	Nõmme Kalju	5
9	(Estonia) Richard Aland	Tammeka	5

=== Discipline ===
==== Player ====
- Most yellow cards: 11
  - (Nigeria) Ganiu Ogungbe (Tammeka)
  - (Estonia) Henrik Ojamaa (Paide)
  - (Serbia) Milan Delević (Paide)
- Most red cards: 4
  - (Ghana) David Epton (Tammeka)

==== Club ====
- Most red cards: 10
  - Tammeka
- Most yellow cards: 91
  - Narva Trans

== Awards ==
=== Monthly awards ===
Month	Player of the Month		Manager of the Month	
Month	Player	Club	Manager	Club
March	(Estonia) Henri Välja	Vaprus	(Spain) Curro Torres	FCI Levadia
April	(Estonia) Nikita Ivanov	Nõmme Kalju	(Russia) Nikita Andreev	Nõmme Kalju
May	(Burkina Faso) Pierre Landry Kaboré	Narva Trans	(Ukraine) Roman Kozhukhovskyi	Narva Trans
June/July	(Estonia) Henrik Ojamaa	Paide Linnameeskond	(Spain) Curro Torres	FCI Levadia
August	(Estonia) Marten-Chris Paalberg	Vaprus	(Estonia) Igor Prins	Vaprus
September	(Estonia) Marten-Chris Paalberg	Vaprus	(Russia) Nikita Andreev	Nõmme Kalju
October	(Estonia) Rauno Sappinen	Flora	(Russia) Nikita Andreev	Nõmme Kalju

=== Annual awards ===
Award	Winner	Club
Player of the Year	(Estonia) Rauno Sappinen	Flora
Goalkeeper of the Year	(Estonia) Karl Andre Vallner	FCI Levadia
Defender of the Year	(Estonia) Erko Jonne Tõugjas	Flora
Midfielder of the Year	(Estonia) Mihkel Ainsalu	FCI Levadia
Forward of the Year	(Estonia) Rauno Sappinen	Flora
Under-21 Player of the Year	(Estonia) Marten-Chris Paalberg	Vaprus
Goal of the Year	(Latvia) Ivans Patrikejevs	Nõmme Kalju
