= Nikita Andreev =

Russian footballer (born 1988)

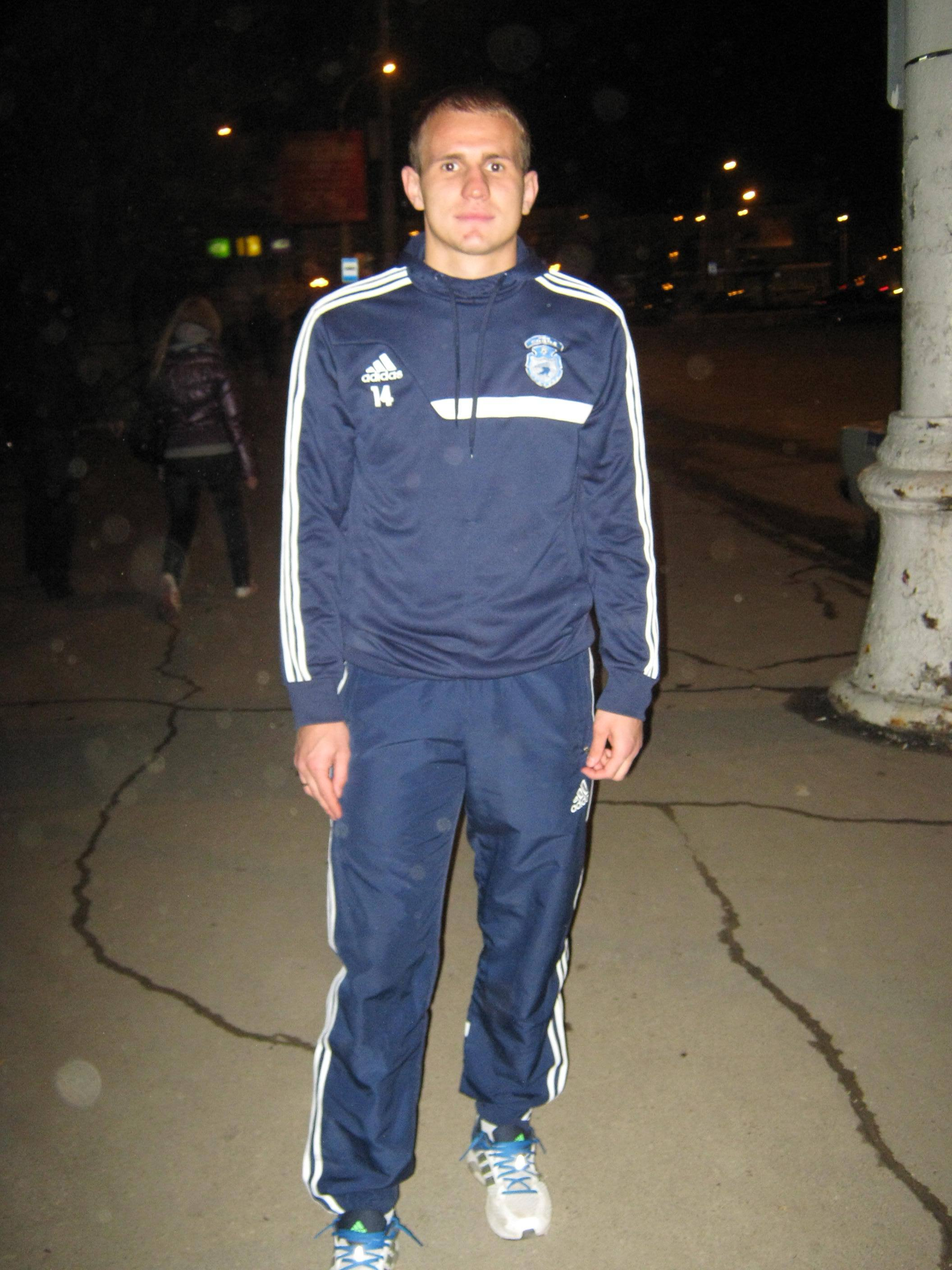
- Nikita Andreev, 2014

Personal information
- Full name: Nikita Yevgenyevich Andreev
- Date of birth: 22 September 1988 (age 38)
- Place of birth: Narva, Estonian SSR, Soviet Union
- Height: 1.80 m (5 ft 11 in)
- Position: Forward

Team information
- Current team: Nõmme Kalju (manager)

Youth career
- 2001–2004: Narva Trans

Senior career*
Years	Team	Apps	(Gls)
2005–2006	Ajax Lasnamäe	32	(29)
2006–2009	Levadia Tallinn	93	(69)
2009–2011	Almería B	26	(8)
2012–2013	FC Tyumen	34	(11)
2014	Sokol Saratov	15	(5)
2014–2016	FC Tambov	39	(17)
2017–2019	Levadia Tallinn	44	(17)
2020	Intercity	8	(1)
2020–2021	Legion	30	(17)
Total		317	(191)

International career
2006–2007	Russia U-19	11	(2)

Managerial career
- 2021: Levadia (assistant)
- 2022: Levadia U21 (assistant)
- 2022: Levadia U21
- 2022: Levadia (caretaker)
- 2023: Nõmme Kalju U21
- 2023: Nõmme Kalju (assistant)
- 2023–: Nõmme Kalju
- * Club domestic league appearances and goals

Nikita Yevgenyevich Andreev (Russian: Никита Евгеньевич Андреев; born 22 September 1988) is a Russian football coach and a former striker. He is the manager of Estonian club Nõmme Kalju.

== Club career ==
=== Early career ===
Andreev began playing football for his hometown PSK (Sports School Paemurru) in 1995 and FC Narva in 2002 -2005, before leaving for Ajax Lasnamäe in early 2005. He scored 29 goals in 32 league appearances in his debut Esiliiga season, becoming the league's top-scorer by an incredible 10 goal margin. After a positive end to the season in which Ajax Lasnamäe finished third, they won the play-off against Kuressaare over two legs, and were promoted to the Meistriliiga. However, promotion was not enough for Andreev, and a transfer to local rivals Levadia Tallinn soon followed in the 2005 close season.

=== Levadia Tallinn ===
==== 2006 season ====
After his transfer from Ajax Lasnamäe, Andreev played 5 games during Levadia's UEFA Cup run, knocking out Finnish side Haka and Dutch club FC Twente, before falling to Newcastle United in the first round. Andreev's only goal during the run was the opening goal in the first leg of Levadia's second qualifying round tie against FC Twente on 10 August 2006.

He finished his debut season for Levadia with 17 goals in 27 league games.

==== 2007 season ====
He played two games for CSKA Moscow at the 2007 CIS Cup while on trial at the club, however he failed to convince head coach Valery Gazzaev to offer him a permanent contract, and he returned to Levadia. Andreev finished the 2007 season with 13 goals in 19 league appearances.

==== 2008 season ====
He played both games of the 2008–09 UEFA Champions League first qualifying round for Levadia Tallinn, though they failed to beat Irish team Drogheda United over two legs, losing 3–1 on aggregate. In the 2008 season, Andreev managed his best ever Meistriliiga goal tally, scoring 22 goals in 30 appearances and finishing as second-top scorer.

==== 2009 season ====
Andreev scored 17 league goals in 17 appearances for Levadia in the 2009 season, before transferring to Tercera División club Almería B in August 2009.

=== Almería B ===
After transferring from Levadia during the 2009–10 La Liga pre-season, Andreev was given the number 19 jersey for his new club.

In 2011–12, after the new signings for Almería B, Andreev was moved back to "juvenil" team.

In the end of 2011, his contract with Almería was rescinded.

=== FC Tyumen ===
In 2012, he signed a contract with Russian Second Division club FC Tyumen. Andreev would later make a handful of Russian National Football League appearances with FC Sokol Saratov and FC Tambov.

=== Intercity ===
In January 2020, he returned to Spain, joining Tercera División club Intercity.

== International career ==
After persistently turning down offers to play for the Estonian football team, Andreev represented the Russian under-19 team at the 2007 UEFA Under-19 Championship in Austria, though they failed to win a match, and crashed out of the tournament in the group stages.

== Personal life ==
Andreev stated in an interview with UEFA.com in July 2009 that he is a patriotic Russian, that he dreams of playing in the Russian league and is a Zenit fan. He also spoke of his commitment to football, stating "I love playing football, no matter where; in the yard, on the beach. I have not lost my desire – it has become even stronger."

== Honours ==
=== Levadia Tallinn ===
- Meistriliiga (3): 2006, 2007, 2008
- Estonian Cup (1): 2006–07

=== Individual ===
- Esiliiga Top Scorer: 2005
- Meistriliiga Young Footballer of the Season: 2006
- Meistriliiga Manager of the Month: August 2023, September 2024, April 2025, September 2025, October 2025,

Awards
Preceded by Incumbent	Meistriliiga Young Footballer of the Season; 2006	Succeeded by (Estonia) Sergei Zenjov
