= Kevin Kauber =

Estonian footballer (born 1995)

Personal information
- Full name: Kevin Kauber
- Date of birth: 23 March 1995 (age 31)
- Place of birth: Tallinn, Estonia
- Height: 1.77 m (5 ft 9 1/2 in)
- Position: Forward

Team information
- Current team: Vaprus
- Number: 11

Youth career
- 2006–2011: SC Real

Senior career*
Years	Team	Apps	(Gls)
2011–2012	Puuma	33	(9)
2012–2014	ÅIFK	28	(12)
2012–2014	TPS	2	(0)
2014–2015	Krka	11	(1)
2015	→ Tolmin (loan)	7	(0)
2016–2018	Jelgava	30	(4)
2016	→ Levadia (loan)	16	(8)
2018	The New Saints	9	(4)
2018	Ekenäs IF	11	(3)
2019–2021	Paide	36	(6)
2022–	Vaprus	140	(24)

International career^{‡}
2010	Estonia U16	1	(0)
2010–2011	Estonia U17	19	(3)
2012–2013	Estonia U19	17	(4)
2013–2016	Estonia U21	26	(3)
2014–2018	Estonia U23	3	(0)
- * Club domestic league appearances and goals as of 17 November 2026 ‡ National team caps and goals as of 17:49, 17 May 2019 (UTC)

Kevin Kauber (born 23 March 1995) is an Estonian footballer who plays as a forward for Vaprus.

== Club career ==
In 2018, he joined Welsh Premier League club The New Saints and left the club in August 2018 to play first-team football in Finland.

== International career ==
Kauber started his international youth career in 2010. He was called up to the senior national team squad for a friendly against Andorra on 1 June 2016, but didn't make an appearance.

== Honours ==
=== Club ===
Jelgava

- Latvian Cup: 2015–16 1st place
- Virsliga: 2016 2nd place

Levadia

- Meistriliiga: 2016 2nd place

The New Saints

- 2017–18 Welsh League cup winner
- 2017–18 Cymru Premier League Champion

Paide

- Meistriliiga: 2020 2nd place
