= Võru County Vocational Training Centre =

Vocational school in Võru, Estonia

Coordinates: 57°53′29.79″N 27°0′48.36″E

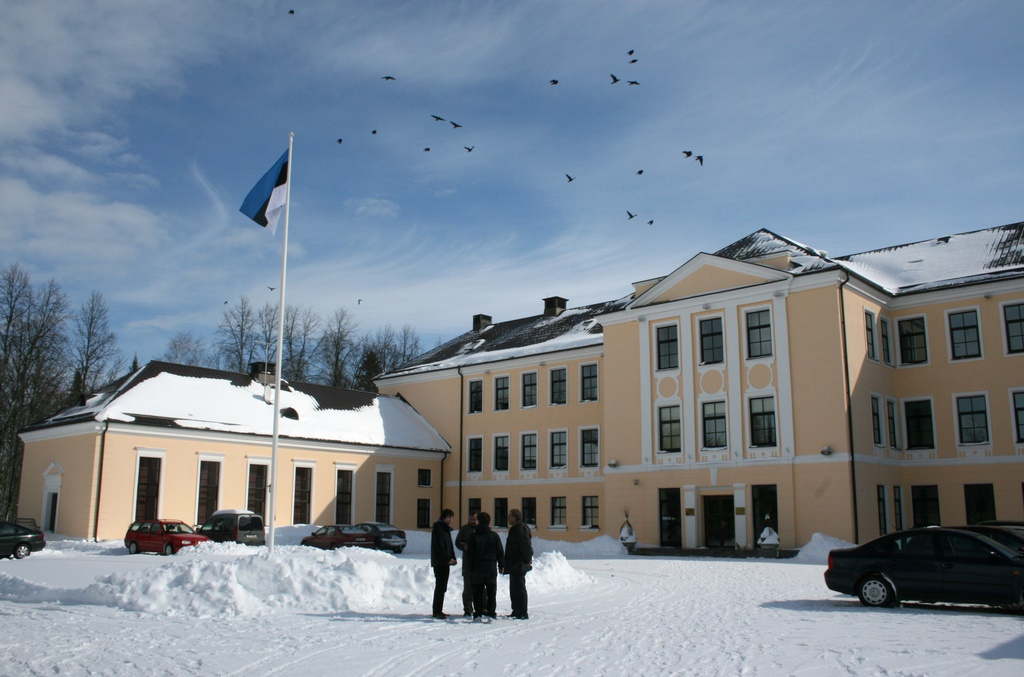
Võru County Vocational Training Centre

Võru County Vocational Training Centre (VCVTC or Võrumaa Kutsehariduskeskus in Estonian) is an educational institution in Väimela, Võrumaa, South-Estonia, which offers secondary vocational education and pre-training study programmes.

== History ==
VCVTC was established in September 1999 as a result of a merger of two schools – Väimela Agricultural Technical School and Võru Industrial Technical School. Võru Industrial Technical School was a successor of the Võru Industrial School, established in 1925, which had been specialising in teaching the skills of wood and metal processing. Väimela Agricultural Technical School, which originates from the Võru Farming School, established in 1920 specialised in teaching agriculture.

While 410 students were enrolled in 1999, today this number has risen over 900.

== Statistics ==
- Number of students: 920
- Number of instructors: 47
- Number of curricula: 16
- Area of study buildings: 6200 m²

== Main curricula ==
- Wood Processing Technology
- Metal Processing
- Mechatronics
- Tourism and Catering Management
- Business Management
- Information Technology Systems

== Awards and programmes ==
VCVTC is member of international ERASMUS charter.

Since 2008 VCVTC has been a member of the Estonian Students Association (EÜL).
