= Marten Paalberg =

Estonian footballer (born 2008)

Personal information
- Full name: Marten-Chris Paalberg
- Date of birth: 8 October 2008 (age 18)
- Place of birth: Pärnu, Estonia
- Height: 1.88 m (6 ft 2 in)
- Position: Forward

Team information
- Current team: Saint-Étienne
- Number: 49

Youth career
- Vaprus

Senior career*
Years	Team	Apps	(Gls)
2024–2026	Vaprus	28	(15)
2026–	Saint-Étienne	0	(0)

International career^{‡}
2022	Estonia U15	2	(0)
2023	Estonia U16	3	(1)
2024–2025	Estonia U17	13	(6)
2025–	Estonia U19	2	(0)
2025–	Estonia	5	(0)
- * Club domestic league appearances and goals as of 3 February 2026 ‡ National team caps and goals as of 16 November 2026

Marten-Chris Paalberg (born 8 October 2008) is an Estonian professional footballer who plays as a forward for French Ligue 2 club Saint-Étienne and the Estonia national team.

== Early life ==
Paalberg was born on 8 October 2008 in Pärnu, Estonia. The son of Katri and Andres, he started playing football at the age of six.

== Club career ==
Paalberg spent his entire youth career at Pärnu Vaprus before making the step up to the club's first team in 2024. He made his Premium Liiga debut on 19 May 2024 against FCI Levadia at the age of 15. During the 2025 season, Paalberg established himself as one of the league's breakout players while being 16 years old. He scored 15 league goals and became the youngest player to score a hat-trick in the Estonian top division. His performances attracted interest from several foreign clubs, including clubs from Premier League and Serie A.

On 2 February 2026, Paalberg signed with Saint-Étienne in French Ligue 2 for a reported transfer fee exceeding €1 million, making him the most expensive outgoing transfer in Estonian league history.

== International career ==
After representing Estonia at youth level, Paalberg received his first senior call-up during the 2026 FIFA World Cup qualification campaign in October 2025. He made his senior international debut on 14 October 2025 in a 1–1 FIFA World Cup qualifier against Moldova, coming on as a substitute at the age of 17 years and 5 days old.

== Career statistics ==
=== Club ===
As of match played 8 November 2025

Appearances and goals by club, season and competition
Club	Season	League			Estonian Cup		Other		Total	
Club	Season	Division	Apps	Goals	Apps	Goals	Apps	Goals	Apps	Goals
Vaprus	2024	Meistriliiga	3	0	2	2	—		5	2
Vaprus	2025	Meistriliiga	25	15	1	0	—		26	15
Career total			28	15	3	2	—		31	17

=== International ===
As of match played 16 November 2026

Appearances and goals by national team and year
National team	Year	Apps	Goals
Estonia	2025	3	0
Estonia	2026	2	0
Total		5	0

== Honours ==
Individual

- Meistriliiga Player of the Month: August 2025, September 2025
