= 2005 Esiliiga =

Estonian football league season for second division

Esiliiga
- Season: 2005

The 2005 Esiliiga is the 15th season of the Esiliiga, second-highest Estonian league for association football clubs, since its establishment in 1992.

JK Pärnu Vaprus gained automatic promotion to the Meistriliiga. FC Ajax Lasnamäe also went up after winning the promotion/relegation play-off against FC Kuressaare. The league's top-scorer was FC Ajax Lasnamäe youngster Nikita Andreev with 29 goals.

== Final table of Esiliiga season 2005 ==
Pos	Team	Pld	W	D	L	GF	GA	GD	Pts	Promotion or relegation
1	Vaprus Pärnu (C, P)	36	26	6	4	92	39	+53	84	Promotion to Meistriliiga
2	Levadia II Tallinn (Note: Reserve teams are ineligible for promotion.)	36	26	4	6	104	31	+73	82	
3	Ajax Lasnamäe (P)	36	23	8	5	111	30	+81	77	Qualification for promotion play-offs
4	Kalev Tallinn	36	18	9	9	85	71	+14	63	
5	Tervis Pärnu	36	14	8	14	73	53	+20	50	
6	TVMK II Tallinn	36	12	5	19	51	80	−29	41	
7	FC Elva	36	10	6	20	42	71	−29	36	
8	Lelle SK (R)	36	11	1	24	49	100	−51	34	Qualification for relegation play-offs
9	Tallinna Jalgpalliklubi (R)	36	9	4	23	38	100	−62	31	Relegation to II liiga
10	Merkuur-Juunior Tartu (R)	36	3	5	28	27	97	−70	14	Relegation to II liiga

Source: rsssf.com
Rules for classification: 1) points; 2) goal difference; 3) number of goals scored.
(C) Champions; (P) Promoted; (R) Relegated

== Promotion/relegation playoff ==
13 November 2005

Lasnamäe Ajax	1 – 0	Kuressaare
Rõtškov 49'

19 November 2005

Kuressaare	2 – 1	Lasnamäe Ajax
Kluge 11'; Pukk 90+1'		Andreev 46'

FC Ajax Lasnamäe beat FC Kuressaare 2–2 on away goals rule. Ajax Lasnamäe promoted to Meistriliiga, Kuressaare relegated to Esiliiga.

== Season statistics ==
=== Top goalscorers ===
As of 1 December 2005.

Rank	Player	Club	Goals
1	(Russia) Nikita Andreev	Lasnamäe Ajax	29
2	(Estonia) Verner Uibo	Pärnu Vaprus	19
3	(Estonia) Indrek Joost	Pärnu Vaprus	18
4	(Estonia) Andrei Afanasov	Tallinna Kalev	15
4	(Russia) Yaroslav Dmitriev	Lasnamäe Ajax	15
4	(Estonia) Tiit Tikenberg	Tallinna Kalev	15
7	(Estonia) Aleksandr Rulkov	Levadia II	14
8	(Estonia) Aleksei Titov	Lasnamäe Ajax	13
9	(Estonia) Dmitri Kirilov	Tallinna Kalev	12
9	(Estonia) Kaupo Margusonov	Pärnu Tervis	12

== See also ==
- 2005 Meistriliiga
