= Väimela =

Borough in Estonia

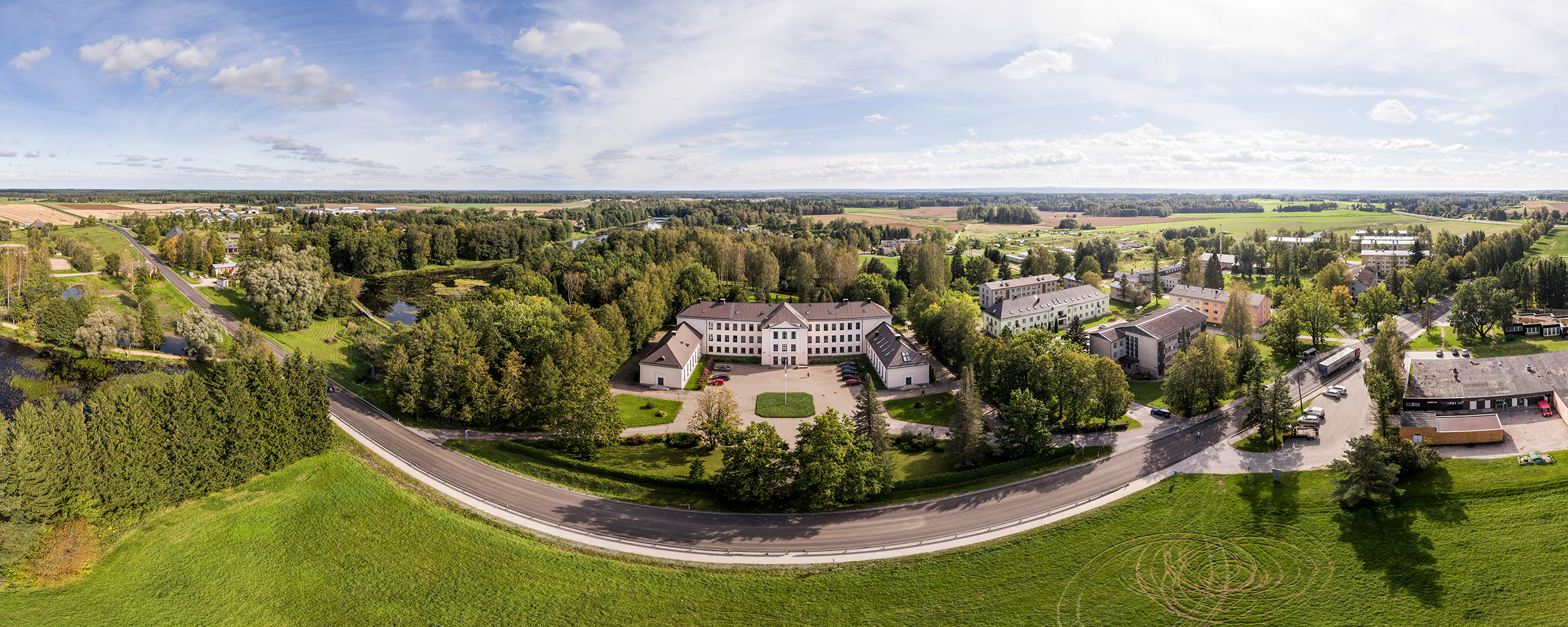

- Location within Estonia
- Coordinates: 57°53′27″N 27°1′8″E
- Country: Estonia
- County: Võru County
- Parish: Võru Parish
- Time zone: UTC+2 (EET)

Väimela (German: Waimel) is a small borough (alevik) in Võru Parish, Võru County in southeastern Estonia. Väimela is located 5 km from Võru. It was first mentioned in historical materials in 1403. The Võru County Vocational Training Centre is in Väimela.

A kolkhoz operated in Väimela during the Soviet era. It was broken up and the land was redistributed to private farmers in 1990.

== Photos ==
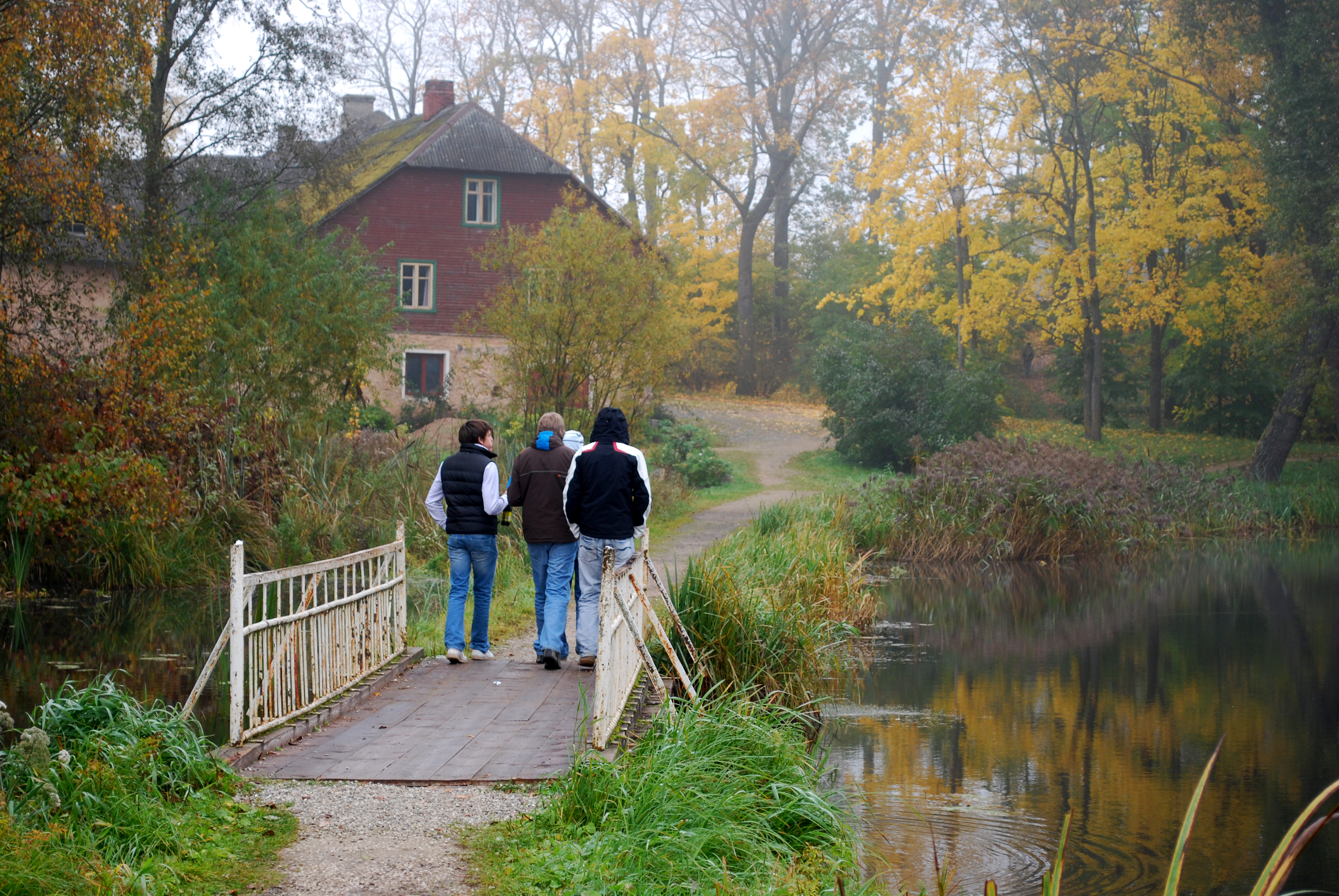
Väimela

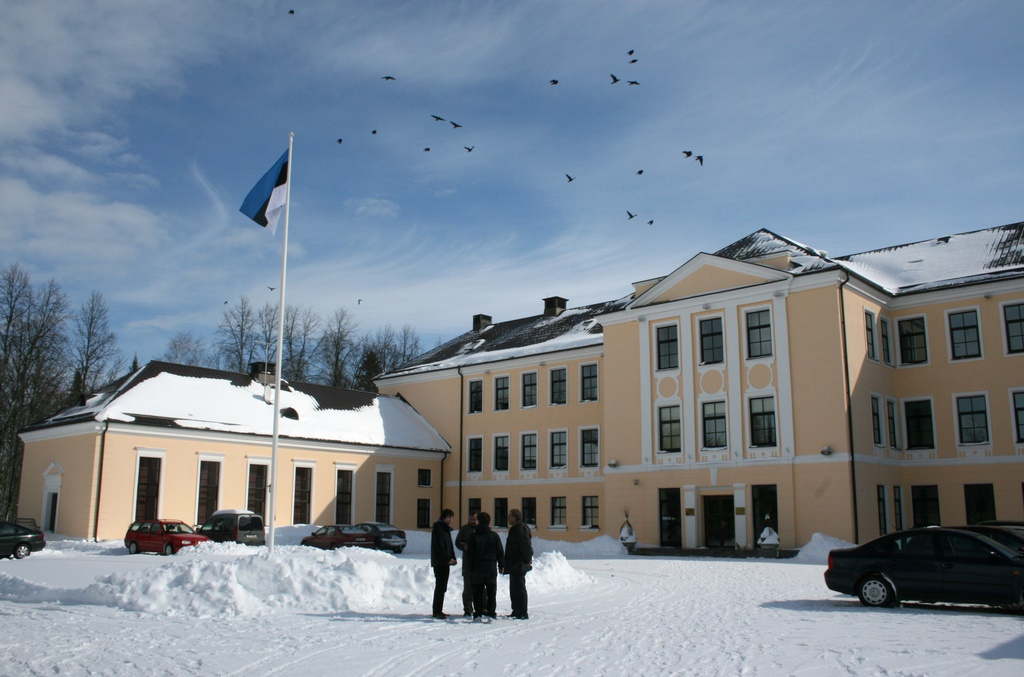
Võru County Vocational Centre in Väimela

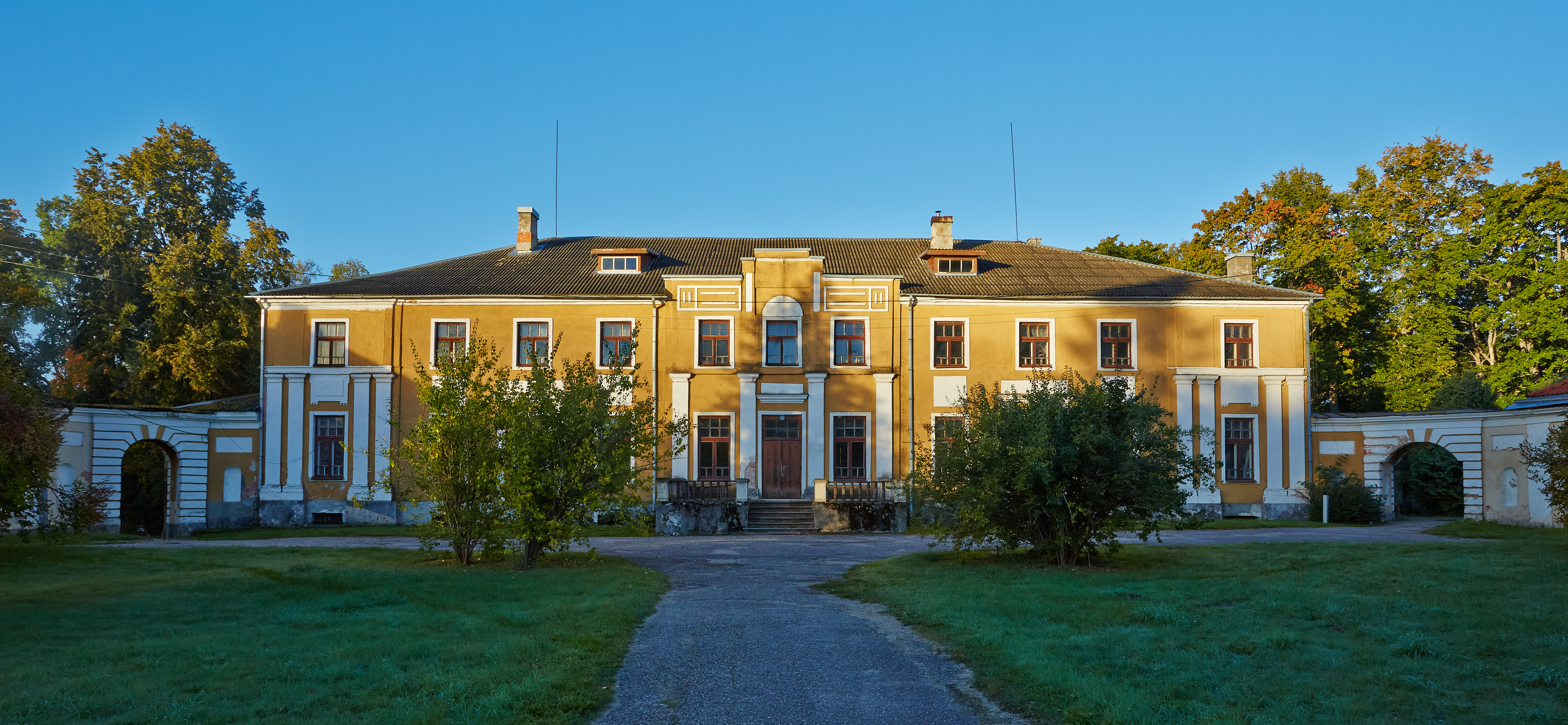
Väimela Manor
