= Loo (village) =

Village in Estonia

Coordinates: 59°26′27″N 25°05′45″E

Loo village, Estonia
- Village
- Interactive map of Loo village, Estonia
- Country: Estonia
- County: Harju County
- Parish: Jõelähtme Parish
- Time zone: UTC+2 (EET)
  - Summer (DST): UTC+3 (EEST)

Loo is a village in Jõelähtme Parish, Harju County in northern Estonia.

== Name ==
Loo was attested in historical sources as Loh Krog in 1689 and Loo körts in 1725 (both referring to the inn there), as Lo between 1810 and 1838, and as Loo in 1798, 1844, and 1871 (referring to the manor dairy farm). The name is derived from the common noun loo 'alvar', referring to the thin soil and sparse vegetation in the area.
