= Mäksa =

Village in Estonia

Coordinates: 58°22′26″N 26°58′37″E

- Village
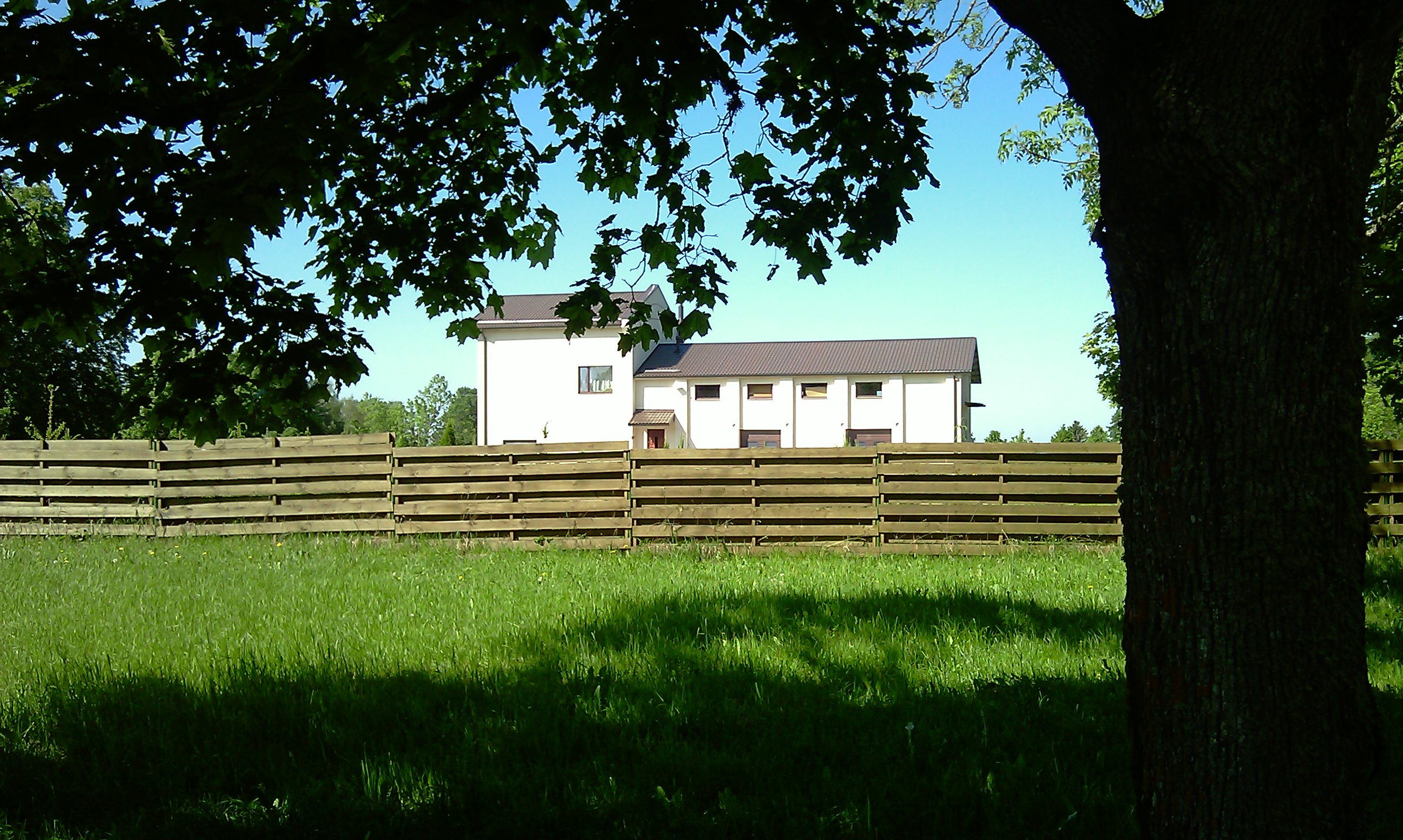
- Interactive map of Mäksa
- Country: Estonia
- County: Tartu County
- Parish: Kastre Parish
- Time zone: UTC+2 (EET)
  - Summer (DST): UTC+3 (EEST)

Mäksa is a village in Kastre Parish, Tartu County in eastern Estonia. Population: 7890 (2021)
