= Karl Andre Vallner =

Estonian footballer (born 1998)

Personal information
- Full name: Karl Andre Vallner
- Date of birth: 28 February 1998 (age 28)
- Place of birth: Tallinn, Estonia
- Height: 1.95 m (6 ft 5 in)
- Position: Goalkeeper

Team information
- Current team: Levadia
- Number: 99

Youth career
- 2006–2007: Loo
- 2007–2016: Tallinna Kalev
- 2013: Flora

Senior career*
Years	Team	Apps	(Gls)
2014–2019	Tallinna Kalev U21	102	(0)
2014–2021	Tallinna Kalev	112	(0)
2021–	Levadia	200	(0)

International career^{‡}
2015	Estonia U18	2	(0)
2016	Estonia U19	3	(0)
2019–2020	Estonia U21	3	(0)
2023–	Estonia	5	(0)
- * Club domestic league appearances and goals as of 17 November 2026 ‡ National team caps and goals as of 21 August 2026

Karl Andre Vallner (born 28 February 1998) is an Estonian professional footballer who plays as a goalkeeper for Meistriliiga club Levadia and the Estonia national team.

== International career ==
Vallner made his senior international debut for Estonia on 8 January 2023, in a 1–1 draw against Iceland in a friendly.

== Honours ==
=== Club ===
FCI Levadia

- Meistriliiga: 2021
- Estonian Cup: 2020–21
- Estonian Supercup: 2022

Individual

- Meistriliiga Goalkeeper of the Season: 2024
