= 2007 Meistriliiga =

Estonian national championships in football

Meistriliiga
- Season: 2007
- Champions: Levadia (5th title)
- Top goalscorer: Dmitry Lipartov (30)

2007 Meistriliiga was the 17th season of the Meistriliiga, Estonia's premier football league. Levadia won their fifth title.

== League table ==
Pos	Team	Pld	W	D	L	GF	GA	GD	Pts	Qualification or relegation
1	Levadia (C)	36	29	4	3	126	20	+106	91	Qualification for Champions League first qualifying round
2	Flora	36	26	5	5	108	30	+78	83	Qualification for UEFA Cup first qualifying round (Note: As Flora Tallinn are guaranteed European football in the UEFA Cup as league runners-up, their spot in the UEFA Cup as Estonian Cup winners is transferred to the next best team in the league. TVMK Tallinn will therefore play in the 2008-09 season of the UEFA Cup)
3	TVMK	36	25	4	7	116	36	+80	79	Qualification for UEFA Cup first qualifying round
4	Narva Trans	36	25	3	8	89	28	+61	78	Qualification for Intertoto Cup first round
5	Maag Tammeka	36	18	8	10	54	40	+14	62	
6	Tallinna Kalev	36	13	4	19	44	74	−30	43	
7	Tulevik	36	11	4	21	43	80	−37	37	
8	Vaprus	36	8	1	27	35	96	−61	25	
9	Kuressaare (R)	36	5	3	28	25	94	−69	18	Qualification for relegation play-offs
10	Lasnamäe Ajax (R)	36	1	2	33	14	153	−139	5	Relegation to Esiliiga

Source: Estonian Football Association (in Estonian)
Rules for classification: 1) points; 2) number of wins; 3) head-to-head points; 4) head-to-head goal difference; 5) head-to-head goals scored; 6) goal difference; 7) number of goals scored.
(C) Champions; (R) Relegated

=== Relegation play-off ===
18 November 2007

Nõmme Kalju	0–1	Kuressaare
		Veskimäe 69'

Hiiu Staadion
Attendance: 440
24 November 2007

Kuressaare	1–2	Nõmme Kalju
Kriska 64'		Tammo 4'; Dona 20'

Kuressaare kunstmuruväljak
Attendance: 150

2–2 on aggregate. Kalju won on away goals and were promoted for the 2008 Meistriliiga. Kuressaare were relegated to the 2008 Esiliiga.

== Results ==
Each team played every opponent four times, twice at home and twice on the road, for a total of 36 games.

=== First half of season ===
Home \ Away	FLO	KUR	AJX	LEV	TAM	TRS	KAL	TUL	TVM	VAP
Flora		5–0	11–0	1–2	3–0	0–2	4–2	4–0	2–2	7–0
Kuressaare	0–1		2–2	0–5	0–2	0–5	1–3	0–1	0–2	3–0
Lasnamäe Ajax	0–2	1–4		0–10	0–2	0–4	1–4	0–5	0–6	0–5
Levadia	2–1	4–0	5–0		2–2	2–0	4–2	4–0	2–0	4–1
Maag Tammeka	0–0	4–1	2–0	1–3		0–2	1–1	1–1	1–3	2–0
Narva Trans	3–1	3–1	2–0	0–0	0–1		0–1	5–1	3–1	2–0
Tallinna Kalev	0–1	2–1	5–0	1–0	0–2	0–2		2–1	1–2	0–2
Tulevik	1–2	0–1	2–0	0–4	0–1	0–2	2–1		1–1	0–1
TVMK	6–0	4–0	7–1	1–1	2–0	2–2	5–0	3–1		9–0
Vaprus	0–3	0–0	1–0	0–5	0–1	0–3	0–1	2–3	0–2	

Legend: Blue = home team win; Yellow = draw; Red = away team win.

=== Second half of season ===
Home \ Away	FLO	KUR	AJX	LEV	TAM	TRS	KAL	TUL	TVM	VAP
Flora		5–1	10–0	3–2	3–1	0–0	4–1	5–0	2–0	8–1
Kuressaare	1–3		0–1	0–3	1–1	0–3	2–0	0–2	0–6	0–3
Lasnamäe Ajax	0–4	1–2		1–2	0–2	0–3	1–1	0–3	0–2	1–7
Levadia	1–1	4–0	7–1		4–0	1–2	8–0	5–0	1–0	5–0
Maag Tammeka	0–0	1–0	5–1	0–3		2–1	4–1	3–1	0–1	3–0
Narva Trans	0–3	5–0	6–1	0–3	2–3		2–0	7–0	4–0	2–1
Tallinna Kalev	1–3	2–1	1–0	0–4	2–2	1–5		1–1	1–3	2–1
Tulevik	0–3	3–2	4–1	0–6	0–0	1–4	1–2		0–1	4–1
TVMK	1–2	5–1	13–0	2–6	2–0	1–0	5–0	5–1		6–3
Vaprus	0–1	2–0	2–0	0–2	0–4	1–3	1–2	0–3	0–5	

Legend: Blue = home team win; Yellow = draw; Red = away team win.

== Season statistics ==
=== Top scorers ===
Rank	Player	Club	Goals
1	(Russia) Dmitri Lipartov	Narva Trans	30
2	(Estonia) Indrek Zelinski	Levadia	23
3	(Estonia) Tiit Tikenberg	Tallinna Kalev	20
4	(Estonia) Maksim Gruznov	Narva Trans	18
5	(Estonia) Jarmo Ahjupera	Flora	17
6	(Estonia) Tarmo Kink	Levadia	16
7	(Estonia) Aleksandr Dubõkin	Narva Trans	14
7	(Finland) Juha Hakola	Flora	14
7	(Estonia) Vjatšeslav Zahovaiko	Flora	14
7	(Estonia) Sergei Zenjov	TVMK	14

== Attendances ==
#	Club	Average
1	Levadia	288
2	Flora	208
3	Pärnu	193
4	Tammeka	156
5	Trans	144
6	TVMK	136
7	Tulevik	114
8	Kalev	109
9	Kuressaare	77
10	Lasnamäe Ajax	48

== See also ==
- 2007 Esiliiga
