= FC Ajax Lasnamäe =

Estonian football club

- Full name: FC Ajax Lasnamäe
- Founded: 1993
- Ground: FC Ajax Stadium, Tallinn
- Capacity: 1,500
- Chairman: Boris Dugan
- Manager: Boris Dugan
- League: II Liiga W/S
- 2022: II liiga W/S, 11th
Home colours	Away colours

FC Ajax Lasnamäe is an Estonian football club based in Tallinn. They play in the II Liiga East/North zone, the fourth division in Estonian football.

The club also has women's team, first appearing in the top division in 2018.

== History ==
In 2003 and 2004, the club was known as F.C.A. Estel Tallinn.

They managed to avoid relegation in 2006, their first Meistriliiga season, finishing 8th. However, in the following season, they were relegated after getting only one win in 36 games and suffering a goal difference of −139.

=== 2010 season ===
FC Ajax Lasnamäe started the 2010 Esiliiga season strongly and eventually finished third behind both FC Flora's and Levadia's reserve squads and thus was promoted to Meistriliiga for the 2011 season.

== Statistics ==
=== League and Cup ===
Season	Division	Pos	Teams	Pld	W	D	L	GF	GA	GD	Pts	Top Goalscorer	Estonian Cup	Notes
1998	III Liiga N	1	10	10	9	0	1	44	8	+36	27	Sergei Dmitrijev (13)		as Lasnamäe JK
1999	II Liiga N/E	5	6	20	7	3	10	26	42	−16	24	Sergei Dmitrijev (6)		as Lasnamäe JK
2000	III Liiga N	5	6	20	5	0	15	19	67	−48	15	Sergei Tasso (7)		as Lasnamäe JK
2001	III Liiga N	2	10	18	13	2	3	61	32	+29	41	Vladislav Makarov (12)		as Tallinna FC Ajax
2002	II Liiga N/E	1	6	20	20	0	0	118	12	+106	60	Aleksei Titov (41)		as Tallinna FC Ajax Estel
2003	Esiliiga	4	8	28	13	5	10	69	45	+24	44	Aleksei Titov (29)		as Tallinna FC Ajax Estel
2004	Esiliiga	6	8	28	10	2	16	66	66	0	32	Aleksei Titov (14)		as Tallinna FC Ajax Estel
2005	Esiliiga	3	10	36	23	8	5	111	30	+81	77	Nikita Andreev (29)		as FC Ajax Lasnamäe
2006	Meistriliiga	8	10	36	6	7	23	35	104	−69	25	Maksim Rõtškov (7)		as FC Ajax Lasnamäe
2007	Meistriliiga	10	10	36	1	2	33	14	153	−139	5	Ivan O'Konnel-Bronin (4)	First Round	as FC Ajax Lasnamäe
2008	Esiliiga	9	10	36	7	9	20	57	79	−22	30	Pavel Iljuhhin and Sergei Tasso (9)	Third Round	as FC Ajax Lasnamäe
2009	Esiliiga	4	10	36	20	4	12	75	53	+22	64	Šahrijar Abdullajev (15)	Third Round	as FC Ajax Lasnamäe
2010	Esiliiga	3	10	36	20	9	7	71	38	+33	69	Sergei Tasso (24)	Semi-Finals	as FC Ajax Lasnamäe
2011	Meistriliiga	10	10	36	0	4	32	11	192	−181	4	Sergei Tasso (5)	First Round	as FC Ajax Lasnamäe
2012	II Liiga E/N	11	14	26	9	4	13	42	42	0	31	Konstantin Televinov (9)	Second Round	as FC Ajax Lasnamäe
2013	II Liiga E/N	6	13	24	10	7	7	69	46	+23	37	Sergei Tasso (25)	Second Round	as FC Ajax Lasnamäe
2014	II Liiga E/N	8	14	26	11	2	13	62	52	+10	35	Sergei Tasso (20)	Second Round	as FC Ajax Lasnamäe
2015	II Liiga E/N	12	14	26	5	6	15	42	63	−21	21	Sergei Tasso (14)	First Round	as FC Ajax Lasnamäe
2016	II Liiga E/N	3	14	26	15	6	5	55	38	+17	51	Konstantin Potapov (17)	-	as FC Ajax Lasnamäe
2017	II Liiga E/N	5	14	26	14	3	9	68	67	+1	45	Jevgeni Merkurjev (19)	-	as FC Ajax Lasnamäe

== Players ==
=== Current squad ===
As of 29 August 2016.

Note: Flags indicate national team as defined under FIFA eligibility rules; some limited exceptions apply. Players may hold more than one non-FIFA nationality.

No.	Pos.	Nation	Player
1	GK	EST	Andrei Golovin
2	MF	EST	Ervin Guzek
3	MF	EST	Agil Halilov
4	DF	EST	Sergei Jarjomenko
5	MF	EST	Andrei Kobjakov
6	DF	EST	Sergei Kobjakov
7	DF	EST	Sergei Kondratenko
8	GK	RUS	Artem Levizi (on loan from JK Sillamäe Kalev)
9	FW	EST	Ilja Ljapin
10	MF	EST	Vitali Mihhasev

No.	Pos.	Nation	Player
11	MF	EST	Šamil Mussajev
12	MF	BLR	Dzmitry Papichyts
13	MF	EST	Sergei Polišnin
14	MF	EST	Konstantin Potapov
15	MF	EST	Jevgeni Romanov
16	MF	UKR	Oleksandr Saietov
17	MF	EST	Aleksandr Starodub
18	DF	EST	Aleksandt Stepuk
19	DF	EST	Andrei Stružkin
20	FW	EST	Sergei Tasso
