= Pärnu JK Vaprus =

Estonian football club

Pärnu Vaprus
- Full name: Pärnu Jalgpalliklubi Vaprus
- Nickname: Karud (The Bears)
- Founded: 1922; 104 years ago Re-established in 1999; 27 years ago
- Ground: Pärnu Rannastaadion
- Capacity: 1,501
- Chairman: Karl Palatu
- Manager: Igor Prins
- League: Meistriliiga
- 2026: Meistriliiga, 7th of 10
- Website: http://vaprus.ee
Home colours	Away colours

Pärnu Jalgpalliklubi Vaprus, commonly known as Pärnu Vaprus or simply Vaprus, is an Estonian professional football club based in Pärnu that competes in the Meistriliiga, the top flight of Estonian football. The club's home ground is Pärnu Rannastaadion.

Founded in 1922, Pärnu Vaprus was dissolved after a merger in 1937 and re-established in 1999. The club has played in the Meistriliiga in 2006–2008, 2017–2018 and again since 2021.

== History ==
Vaprus was formed in May 1922, as Spordiselts Vaprus (English: Sporting Society 'Bravery'). The club was active in various sports and credited for organising the first intercity running competitions from Pärnu to Tallinn and from Pärnu to Riga. In football, Vaprus competed in the local Pärnu football championships, winning in 1927 and 1934. However, the club failed to reach the heights of their rivals Pärnu Tervis and in 1937, Vaprus merged with several other local sporting clubs to form Pärnu Kalev.

The club was re-established in 1999 as an amateur team playing in the lower leagues. In 2003, several local clubs merged with Vaprus, including former top league club Pärnu Levadia, forming a working football club. Vaprus won the 2005 Esiliiga season and was, for the first time in the club's history, promoted to Estonia's top-flight football league Meistriliiga. The club finished their first Meistriliiga season in 7th place. Vaprus finished the 2008 Meistriliiga season in 10th place, but managed to avoid direct relegation due to disbandment of TVMK. However, the club was still relegated after losing the relegation play-offs against Paide Linnameeskond.

In 2010, Vaprus formed a united team Pärnu Linnameeskond with PJK and Pärnu Kalev. Vaprus itself continued to only operate in youth football until 2014, when they entered their senior team to Estonian lower leagues. Pärnu Linnameeskond reached Estonian top flight in 2015, but broke up after two seasons with Pärnu Vaprus inheriting their league spot for 2017.

After an eight-year absence, Vaprus returned to top-flight football and moved to the newly renovated 1,501-seat Pärnu Rannastaadion. The club finished the season in last place, but managed to avoid relegation due to Sillamäe Kalev's bankruptcy. However, the club again placed last and was relegated in the following 2018 season. Vaprus lifted the second division title in 2020 and returned to Meistriliiga, where they finished bottom of the table in both 2021 and 2022, but avoided relegation on each occasion due to Viljandi Tulevik and TJK Legion withdrawing from the top flight for financial reasons.

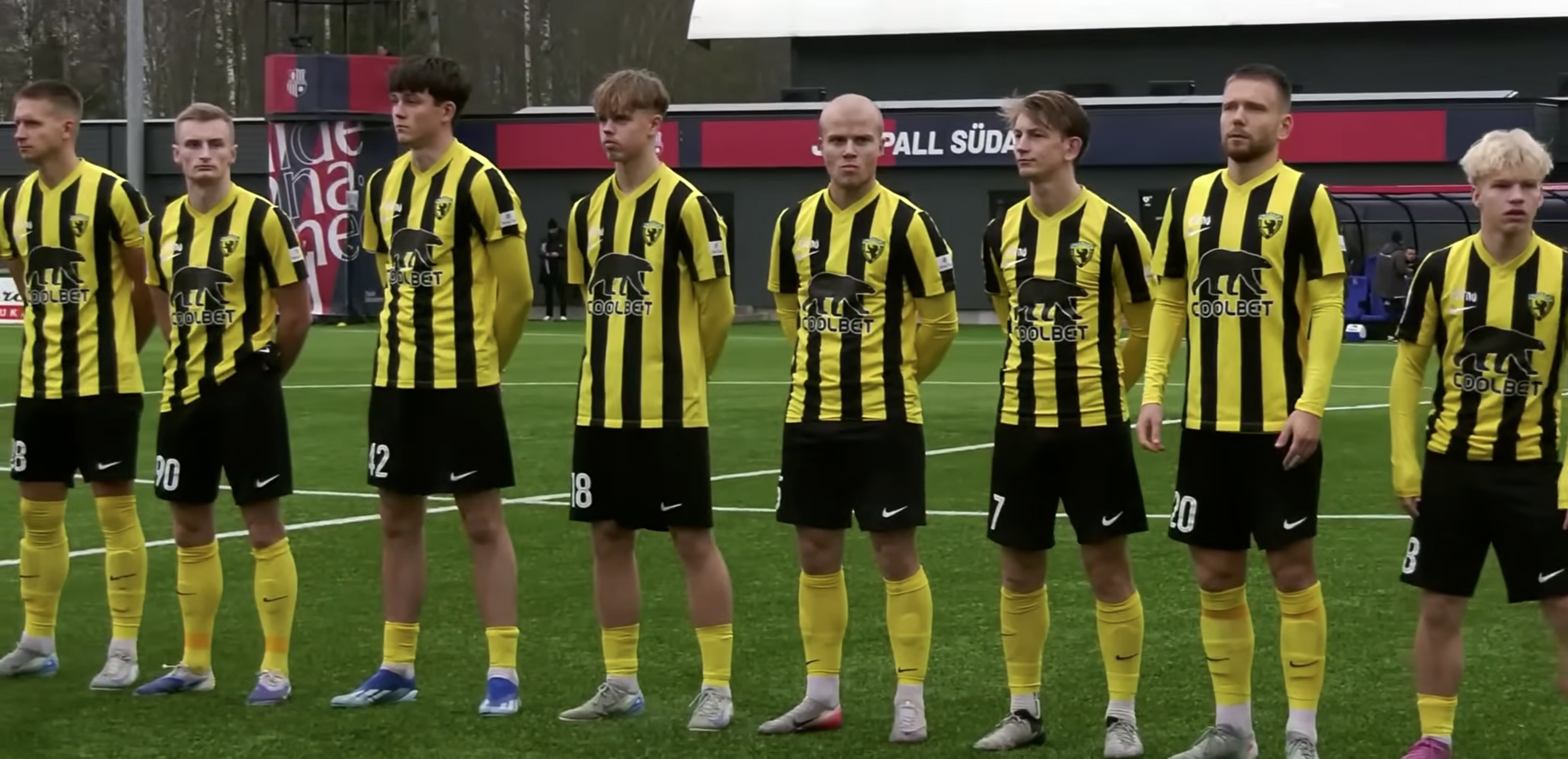
Pärnu Vaprus in 2025

Pärnu Vaprus appointed Igor Prins as their manager for the following 2023 season and recorded their most successful season in the club's history, surprisingly occupying 3rd place until matchday 27 and finishing the season in 6th place with 48 points, despite being considered as clear relegation candidates at the start of the year. Vaprus finished the following year in 7th place, before repeating their highest 6th place finish in 2025, accumulating a club record 49 points. During the season, the club's 16-year-old forward Marten-Chris Paalberg was called up to the Estonian national team.

== Kit manufacturers and shirt sponsors ==
Period	Kit manufacturer	Shirt sponsor	Ref
2017–	Nike	Coolbet	

== Stadium ==
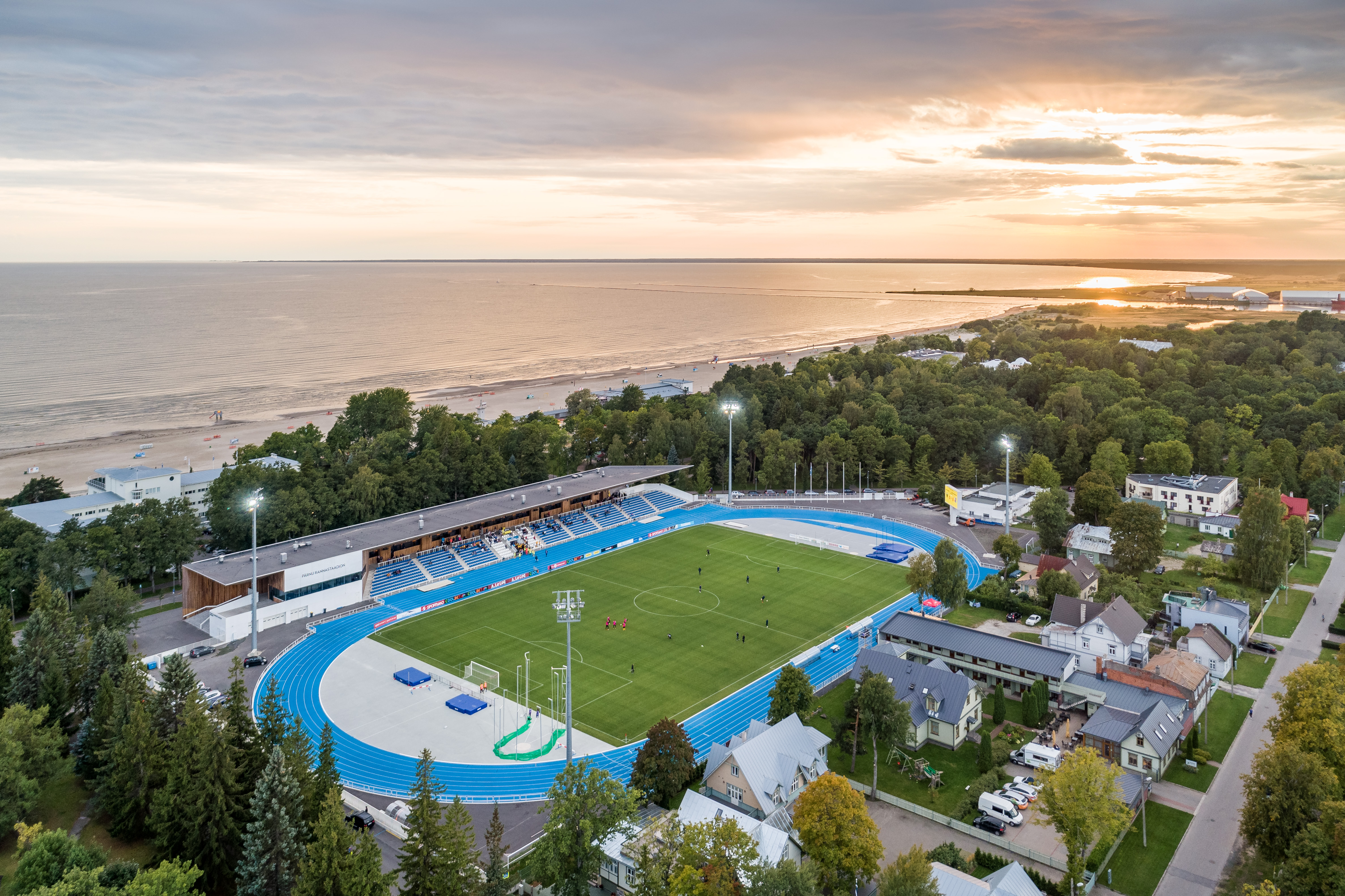
Pärnu Rannastaadion

The club's home ground is the 1,501-seat Pärnu Rannastaadion. First opened in 1929, it was the home of Vaprus until its dissolution in 1937 and again since the early 2000s after the club's re-establishment. The stadium was completely reconstructed in 2015–2016.

Vaprus plays their home matches during winter and early spring months at the Pärnu Rehepapi artificial turf ground and uses the adjacent indoor football facility Pärnu Jalgpallihall, which opened in 2023 and cost over €4.7 million, as training centre during the snowy winter period.

== Players ==
=== First-team squad ===
As of 25 August 2026

Note: Flags indicate national team as defined under FIFA eligibility rules; some limited exceptions apply. Players may hold more than one non-FIFA nationality.

No.	Pos.	Nation	Player
1	GK	EST	Hendrik Vainu
3	DF	EST	Karl Tristan Rand
4	DF	EST	Magnus Villota (captain)
5	DF	EST	Siim Aer
7	FW	EST	Virgo Vallik
8	MF	EST	Tristan Pajo
9	MF	EST	Joosep Põder
10	MF	EST	Sten Jakob Viidas
11	FW	EST	Kevin Kauber
12	GK	EST	Markkus Ristimets
14	MF	EST	Rasmus Orm
15	DF	EST	Kevin Aloe
16	GK	EST	Ott Nõmm
17	MF	EST	Sander Kapper
19	MF	EST	Ako Henno Kõrre

No.	Pos.	Nation	Player
20	MF	EST	Henri Välja
22	FW	EST	Mark Anders Lepik (on loan from Flora)
24	MF	EST	Mathias Villota
28	DF	EST	Marko Lipp
42	MF	EST	Matthias Limberg
43	DF	EST	Markkus Seppik
47	MF	EST	Sander Kõlvart
64	DF	EST	Johann Gregor Allas
66	DF	EST	Uku Nomm
74	FW	EST	Kerdo Kutsar
81	FW	EST	Emil Dolgov
86	MF	EST	Raul Roosson
88	DF	EST	Ekke Kesküla
90	DF	EST	Joonas Sild

== Personnel ==
=== Current technical staff ===
Position	Name
Manager	(Estonia) Igor Prins
Assistant coach	(Estonia) Taavi Viik
Goalkeeping coach	(Estonia) Priit Pikker
Physiotherapist	(Estonia) Valdo Järvekülg
Management
Sporting Director	(Estonia) Karl Palatu
Board member	(Estonia) Jaak Roosson
Chief Executive Officer	(Estonia) Karin Lipstuhl

=== Managerial history ===
Dates	Name
1995–1996	(Estonia) Ants Kommussaar
2004–2008	(Estonia) Kalev Pajula
2008	(Estonia) Ants Kommussaar
2009	(Estonia) Gert Olesk
2014	(Estonia) Rain Põldme
2015–2016	(Estonia) Taavi Midenbritt
2017	(Estonia) Marko Lelov
2017–2018	(Estonia) Indrek Zelinski
2019	(Estonia) Kalev Pajula
2019–2021	(Estonia) Taavi Midenbritt
2022	(Latvia) Dmitrijs Kalašņikovs
2023–	(Estonia) Igor Prins

== Honours ==
- Esiliiga
  - Winners (2): 2005, 2020
- II Liiga
  - Winners (1): 2004
- III Liiga
  - Winners (1): 2000

== Seasons and statistics ==
Season	Division	Pos	Pld	W	D	L	GF	GA	GD	Pts	Top goalscorer	Cup
1999	III liiga	3	20	9	5	6	54	42	+12	32	(Estonia) Raino Lapp (17)	
2000	III liiga	1	20	14	2	4	60	22	+38	44	(Estonia) Raino Lapp (12)	
2001	II liiga	2	20	13	4	3	63	25	+38	43	(Estonia) Mihkel Vorman (11)	
2002	II liiga	5	20	7	2	11	25	39	−14	23		
2003	Esiliiga	7	28	5	7	16	42	71	−29	22	(Estonia) Marek Markson (10)	
2004	II liiga	1	28	24	4	0	157	21	+136	76	(Estonia) Indrek Joost (28)	
2005	Esiliiga	1	36	26	6	4	92	39	+53	84	(Estonia) Verner Uibo (19)	
2006	Meistriliiga	7	36	10	4	22	49	86	−37	34	(Estonia) Ranet Lepik (9)	
2007	Meistriliiga	8	36	8	1	27	35	96	−61	25	(Estonia) Mihhail Kazak (7)	Quarter-finals
2008	Meistriliiga	9	36	5	2	29	41	125	−84	17	(Estonia) Martin Partsioja (7)	Third round
2009	Esiliiga	7	36	11	6	19	64	77	−13	39	(Estonia) Taavi Laurits (9)	Third round
2010	Esiliiga	7	36	10	7	19	57	78	−21	37	(Estonia) Taavi Laurits (13)	
2014	IV liiga	9	16	1	2	13	13	46	−33	5	(Estonia) Henri Hansson (3) (Estonia) Kaspar Mitt (3)	
2015	IV liiga	2	18	12	3	3	55	21	+34	39	(Estonia) Jaak-Peeter Oja (15)	
2016	III liiga	2	22	19	0	3	69	22	+47	57	(Estonia) Robyn Hallmere (12)	
2017	Meistriliiga	10	36	2	2	32	29	146	−117	8	(Estonia) Kristen Saarts (8)	
2018	Meistriliiga	10	36	2	7	27	25	123	−98	13	(Estonia) Tõnis Vihmoja (8)	Second round
2019	Esiliiga	3	36	21	4	11	73	48	+25	67	(Estonia) Kristen Saarts (19)	Third round
2020	Esiliiga	1	32	19	8	5	72	30	+42	65	(Estonia) Ronaldo Tiismaa (14)	Second round
2021	Meistriliiga	10	30	5	3	22	24	88	−64	18	(Estonia) Enrico Veensalu (Estonia) Anton Krutogolov (5)	Third round
2022	Meistriliiga	10	36	3	2	31	32	96	−64	11	(Estonia) Ronaldo Tiismaa (7)	First round
2023	Meistriliiga	6	36	12	12	12	40	43	−3	48	(Estonia) Kevin Kauber (8)	Second round
2024	Meistriliiga	7	36	9	8	19	35	57	−22	35	(Estonia) Kevin Kauber (7)	Third round
2025	Meistriliiga	6	36	14	7	15	54	51	+3	49	(Estonia) Marten-Chris Paalberg (15)	Quarter-finals

1. Pärnu Vaprus inherited the 2017 Meistriliiga league spot left vacant by the dissolved Pärnu Linnameeskond.
