= 2009 Esiliiga =

Estonian football league season for second division

Esiliiga
- Season: 2009
- Champions: Levadia II
- Relegated: Flora II, Flora Rakvere
- Matches: 175
- Goals: 663 (3.79 per match)
- Top goalscorer: Tõnis Stakopf (32)
- Biggest home win: Levadia 7–0 Lasnamäe Ajax
- Biggest away win: Warrior 0–12 Levadia
- Highest scoring: Warrior 0–12 Levadia

The 2009 season of the Esiliiga (the second league of the Estonian football system).

== Overview ==
Location of the Esiliiga 2009 teams

Club	Location	Stadium	Current manager
Flora II	Tallinn	Sportland Arena	(Estonia) Erki Kesküla
Flora Rakvere	Rakvere	Linnastaadion	(Estonia) Urmas Kirs
Lasnamäe Ajax	Tallinn	FC Ajax Stadium	(Estonia) Aleksandr Puštov
Levadia II	Tallinn	Maarjamäe kunstmuru	(Estonia) Urmas Hepner
Lootus	Kohtla-Järve	SK Stadium	(Estonia) Andrei Škaleta
Tamme Auto	Kiviõli	Kiviõli Stadium	(Estonia) Erik Šteinberg
TJK Legion	Tallinn	Wismari Stadium	(Estonia) Viktor Passikuta
Tulevik II	Viljandi	Linnastaadion	(Estonia) Aivar Lillevere
Warrior	Valga	Sportland Arena	(Estonia) Zaur Tšilingarašvili
Vaprus	Pärnu	Kalevi Stadium	(Estonia) Ants Kommussaar

== Standings ==
Pos	Team	Pld	W	D	L	GF	GA	GD	Pts	Promotion or relegation
1	Levadia II (Note: Reserve teams are ineligible for promotion.) (C)	36	26	8	2	96	21	+75	86	
2	Lootus (P)	36	24	2	10	88	48	+40	74	Promotion to Meistriliiga
3	Warrior	36	21	2	13	68	63	+5	65	Qualification for promotion play-offs
4	Lasnamäe Ajax	36	20	4	12	75	53	+22	64	
5	Tamme Auto (Note: Three points deducted from Kiviõli Tamme Auto and six from FC Flora Rakvere before season because of licensing problems.)	36	17	2	17	77	77	0	50	
6	TJK Legion	36	13	5	18	63	76	−13	44	
7	Vaprus	36	11	6	19	64	77	−13	39	
8	Tulevik II	36	10	6	20	49	79	−30	36	Qualification for relegation play-offs
9	Flora U21 (R)	36	9	5	22	35	64	−29	32	Relegation to II Liiga
10	Rakvere (R)	36	8	2	26	48	105	−57	20	Relegation to II Liiga

Source: Jalgpall.ee Soccernet.ee
Rules for classification: 1) points; 2) goal difference; 3) number of goals scored.
(C) Champions; (P) Promoted; (R) Relegated

== Results ==
Each team will play every opponent four times, twice at home and twice on the road, for a total of 36 games.

=== First half of season ===
Home \ Away	FLO	RAK	AJX	LEV	LOT	TMA	TJK	TV2	VPR	WAR
Flora U21		0–2	0–1	0–0	0–0	0–2	4–2	1–2	0–3	0–1
Rakvere	0–2		1–3	0–2	2–4	2–1	3–4	1–3	1–5	1–0
Lasnamäe Ajax	1–1	0–2		0–4	1–2	7–3	1–1	3–0	4–0	2–1
Levadia II	4–0	5–0	7–0		0–0	2–4	1–1	4–0	2–0	2–1
Lootus	5–1	2–1	3–2	0–2		2–4	0–2	4–1	2–0	3–1
Tamme Auto	1–0	5–0	4–1	1–1	1–3		3–0	4–0	4–3	0–1
TJK Legion	4–2	3–1	1–1	0–6	0–1	3–3		3–1	5–1	6–2
Tulevik II	2–1	4–3	4–0	2–2	1–2	0–1	3–1		1–4	0–0
Vaprus	0–2	2–1	1–1	1–1	1–0	3–2	2–1	1–1		0–2
Warrior	3–0	2–4	2–0	0–12	1–0	5–0	2–1	3–2	1–3	

Updated to match(es) played on 5 July 2009. Source: Jalgpall.ee
Legend: Blue = home team win; Yellow = draw; Red = away team win.

=== Second half of season ===
Home \ Away	FLO	RAK	AJX	LEV	LOT	TMA	TJK	TV2	VPR	WAR
Flora U21			1–3	1–1	0–3	3–0	0–1	0–1	4–2	0–1
Rakvere	1–0		2–3	2–3	0–5	0–6	3–1	0–2	2–2	1–3
Lasnamäe Ajax	5–0	3–1		1–2	2–0	4–1	4–1	3–0	4–0	0–2
Levadia II	1–1	5–0	1–0		1–0	4–0		1–0	2–1	2–1
Lootus	3–4	7–2	2–1	3–1		4–1	3–1	4–1	4–2	2–3
Tamme Auto	4–0	4–1		0–2	1–6		0–2	3–1	1–2	0–1
TJK Legion	0–1	3–0	0–3	0–1	1–2	2–3		1–1	2–1	2–4
Tulevik II	1–0	2–2	0–3	0–3		1–2	0–1		2–8	0–2
Vaprus	0–1	3–3	1–2	1–2	4–1	3–4	3–4	3–3		
Warrior	2–1	4–1	1–2	0–2	0–3	4–3	7–2	2–5	1–1	

Updated to match(es) played on 2 November 2009. Source: Jalgpall.ee
Legend: Blue = home team win; Yellow = draw; Red = away team win.

== Season statistics ==
=== Top goalscorers ===
Updated 11 November 2009.

Rank	Player	Club	Goals
1	(Estonia) Tõnis Starkopf	Kiviõli Tamme Auto	32
2	(Estonia) Anton Semjonov	Lootus	19
3	(Estonia) Sander Rõivassepp	Warrior	18
4	(Estonia) Vitali Bolšakov	Lootus	17
4	(Russia) Yaroslav Dmitriev	Levadia II	17
4	(Estonia) Maksim Kisseljov	TJK Legion	17
4	(Estonia) Jaan Leimann	Warrior	17
8	(Russia) Aleksandr Pavlikhin	TJK Legion	16
9	(Estonia) Šahrijar Abdullajev	Lasnamäe Ajax	15
10	(Estonia) Sergei Tasso	Lasnamäe Ajax	12

== Monthly awards ==
Month	Manager	Club	Player	Club
03/09	Zaur Tšilingarašvili	Warrior	Tõnis Starkopf	Tamme Auto
04/09	Aleksey Zhukov	Lootus	Yaroslav Dmitriev	Levadia II
05/09	Aleksandr Puštov	Levadia II	Sergei Popov	Lootus
06/09	Aleksandr Puštov	Levadia II	Konstantin Karin	Lootus
07/09	Andrei Borissov	Lasnamäe Ajax	Maksim Kisseljov	TJK Legion
08/09	Aleksandr Puštov	Levadia II	Sergei Tasso	Lasnamäe Ajax
09/09	Aleksey Zhukov	Lootus	Sander Rõivassepp	Warrior

== See also ==
- 2009 Meistriliiga
- 2008–09 Estonian Cup · 2009–10
