= 2008 Esiliiga =

Estonian football league season for second division

Esiliiga
- Season: 2008

The 2008 season of the Esiliiga (the second league of the Estonian football system).

== League standings ==
Pos	Team	Pld	W	D	L	GF	GA	GD	Pts	Promotion or relegation
1	FC Levadia II (Note: Reserve teams are ineligible for promotion.) (C)	36	22	6	8	83	33	+50	72	
2	FC Kuressaare (P)	36	21	8	7	67	35	+32	71	Promotion to Meistriliiga
3	FC Flora II	36	18	8	10	62	41	+21	62	
4	FC Flora Paide LM (O, P)	36	14	11	11	58	44	+14	53	Qualification for promotion play-offs
5	Valga Warrior	36	13	9	14	46	56	−10	48	
6	Kiviõli Tamme Auto	36	11	11	14	51	66	−15	44	
7	JK Maag Tammeka II	36	11	10	15	60	63	−3	43	
8	FC Flora Rakvere	36	10	7	19	53	82	−29	37	
9	Lasnamäe Ajax	36	8	9	19	59	79	−20	33	Qualification for relegation play-offs
10	FC TVMK II (Note: On 6 November Estonian Football Association License Commission decided to take TVMK's license to play in Meistriliiga or Esiliiga, due to financial difficulties during the season. The Estonian Football Association helped them to play until the end of the season and as they finished in 3rd place, the players and coaches got bronze medals, but the club itself was demoted to 10th spot.) (R)	36	11	3	22	58	98	−40	36	Relegation to II liiga

(C) Champions; (O) Play-off winners; (P) Promoted; (R) Relegated

=== Relegation play-off ===
Ajax Lasnamäe and II Liiga Ida/Põhi side TJK Legion will compete in a two-legged relegation play-off for one spot in 2009 Esiliiga.

20 November 2008
17:00

TJK Legion	2 – 0	Ajax Lasnamäe
Kisseljov 2'; Kutuzov 77'	Report

Wismari Stadium
Attendance: 90
Referee: Mart Martin

23 November 2008
12:00

Ajax Lasnamäe	1 – 1	TJK Legion
Kirpu 3'	Report	Kisseljov 67'

Sportland Arena
Attendance: 23
Referee: Martin Salong

== Season statistics ==
=== Top goalscorers ===
As of 16 November 2008.

Rank	Player	Club	Goals
1	(Estonia) Sergei Jegorov	TVMK II	20
2	(Estonia) Alar Petrovits	Rakvere Flora	17
3	(Estonia) Tõnis Starkopf	Kiviõli Tamme Auto	15
4	(Estonia) Martti Pukk	Kuressaare	14
5	(Estonia) Albert Prosa	Maag Tammeka II	13
6	(Russia) Dmitri Skiperski	Kuressaare	11
6	(Estonia) Erik Šteinberg	Kiviõli Tamme Auto	11
8	(Estonia) Sergei Akimov	Rakvere Flora	10
8	(Estonia) Jevgeni Gurtšioglujants	Levadia II	10
8	(Estonia) Sander Rõivassepp	Flora II	10
8	(Estonia) Janar Toomet	Flora II	10

== See also ==
- 2008 Meistriliiga
- 2008 Estonian Lower Leagues
