= 2022 in Estonian football =

Football in Estonia
- Season: 2022

Men's football
- Meistriliiga: Tallinna Flora
- Esiliiga: Harju Laagri
- Esiliiga B: Tallinn
- Beach football: Nõmme Olybet
- Futsal: Tallinna Cosmos
- Tipneri karikas: Paide Linnameeskond
- Supercup: Tallinna Levadia

Women's football
- Meistriliiga: Tallinna Flora
- Esiliiga: Lasnamäe Ajax
- Futsal: –
- Estonian Cup: Tallinna Flora
- Supercup: Tallinna Flora

This page summarizes everything related to Estonian football in the year 2022. It contains information about different league systems, national teams, futsal, beach football and most important transfers.

== National teams ==
=== Men ===
==== Senior ====
The men's national team took part in the 2020-21 Nations League C-division relegation play-outs, where they played a two legged tie against Cyprus. Estonians managed to score two goals in the opening leg but both of them were later cancelled by VAR and the match therefore ended in a stalemate. Before the second leg, Estonian national team lost a few key players (Mattias Käit fell ill, Maksim Paskotši got injured; Karl Jakob Hein and Märten Kuusk got injured before the first game). In the end, Estonia lost the away game 0–2 and took part in League D in the 2022-23 UEFA Nations League.

Estonia had quite a successful season in League D: they won both games against San Marino and Malta by scoring last minute goals. Therefore, Estonia got promoted back to League C on their first try.

At the end of the year, the Baltic states contested the 29th Baltic Cup. Due to only having two possible matchdays, it was decided that the 2022 tournament will be held as a knock-out tournament. Iceland was invited to be the fourth team. Estonia lost its first match against Latvia on penalties and therefore could not defend their 2020 Baltic Cup win. In the third-place match Estonia beat Lithuania.

24 March 2020–21 UEFA NL play-outs	Estonia	0–0	Cyprus	Tallinn, Estonia
19:00 (UTC+3)		Report		Stadium: Lilleküla Stadium; Attendance: 5,366; Referee: Willie Collum (Scotland)

29 March 2020–21 UEFA NL play-outs	Cyprus	2–0	Estonia	Larnaca, Cyprus
19:00 (UTC+3)	Tzionis 19'; Sotiriou 51'	Report		Stadium: AEK Arena – Georgios Karapatakis; Referee: Artur Soares Dias (Portugal)

2 June 2022–23 UEFA NL division D	Estonia	2–0	San Marino	Tallinn, Estonia
21:45 (UTC+3)	Kirss 24'; Tamm 32'	Report		Stadium: Lilleküla Stadium; Attendance: 3,533; Referee: Ioannis Papadopoulos (Greece)

5 June Friendly	Argentina	5–0	Estonia	Pamplona, Spain
21:00 (UTC+3)	Messi 8' (pen.), 45', 47', 71', 76'	Report		Stadium: El Sadar Stadium; Attendance: 18,332; Referee: Urs Schnyder (Switzerland)

9 June 2022–23 UEFA NL division D	Malta	1–2	Estonia	Ta'Qali, Malta
21:45 (UTC+3)	Degabriele 56'	Report	21' Vassiljev; 90+4' Anier	Stadium: National Stadium; Attendance: 3,422; Referee: Bobby Madden (Scotland)

13 June Friendly	Albania	0–0	Estonia	Tirana, Albania
20:00 (UTC+3)		Report		Stadium: Arena Kombëtare; Referee: Philip Farrugia (Malta)

23 September 2022–23 UEFA NL division D	Estonia	2–1	Malta	Tallinn, Estonia
19:00 (UTC+3)	Sappinen 45+6' (pen.); Anier 86'	Report	51' (pen.) Teuma	Stadium: Lilleküla Stadium; Attendance: 5,539; Referee: Daniel Siebert (Germany)

26 September 2022–23 UEFA NL division D	San Marino	0–4	Estonia	Serravalle, San Marino
21:45 (UTC+3)		Report	38', 77' Anier; 56' Teniste; 66' Sappinen	Stadium: San Marino Stadium; Attendance: 608; Referee: Kateryna Monzul (Ukraine)

16 November Baltic Cup SF	Latvia	1–1 (5–3 p)	Estonia	Riga, Latvia
19:00 (UTC+2)	Krollis 45+2'	Report	2' Zenjov	Stadium: Daugava Stadium; Attendance: 1,657; Referee: Robertas Valikonis (Lithuania)
	Penalties
	J. Ikaunieks (penalty scored); Zjuzins (penalty scored); Jaunzems (penalty scored); D. Ikaunieks (penalty scored); Stuglis (penalty scored)		(penalty scored) Mets; (penalty scored) Vassiljev; (penalty missed) Zenjov; (penalty scored) Sorga

19 November Baltic Cup 3rd place	Estonia	2–0	Lithuania	Tallinn, Estonia
16:00 (UTC+2)	Zenjov 65'; Peetson 89'	Report		Stadium: A. Le Coq Arena; Attendance: 1,563; Referee: Vitalijs Spasjonņikovs (Latvia)

==== Youth ====
U21

Although it was confirmed after the first seven matches of the groupstage that the men's national U21 team will not qualify for the 2023 U21 Euros, the team still has to play three more games in 2022.

25 March Qualification for the 2023 UEFA EC	Azerbaijan	3–0	Estonia	Sumgait, Azerbaijan
16:00 (19:00 UTC+4)	Gurbanlı 44', 66'; Khaibulaev 88'	Report		Stadium: Kapital Bank Arena; Attendance: 1,080; Referee: David Munro (Scotland)

29 March Friendly	Georgia	4–1	Estonia	Tbilisi, Georgia
17:00	Moistrapišvili 34', 55'; Dartsmelia 90'; Šekiladze 90'	Report	75' A. M. Tamm	Stadium: Tengiz Burjanadze Stadium

2 June Qualification for the 2023 UEFA EC	Estonia	0–5	Azerbaijan	Pärnu, Estonia
18:00 (19:00 EEST)		Report	3', 33' Gurbanlı; 49' (pen.) R. Abdullazada; 50' Nuriyev; 84' Zulfugarli	Stadium: Pärnu Rannastaadion; Referee: Robert Ian Jenkins (Wales)

8 June Qualification for the 2023 UEFA EC	Estonia	0–4	Croatia	Pärnu, Estonia
18:00 (19:00 EEST)		Report	7' Vidović; 14' Vušković; 41' Marin; 55' Fruk	Stadium: Pärnu Rannastaadion; Referee: Ashot Ghaltakhchyan (Armenia)

16 November Baltic Cup	Estonia	5–1	Lithuania	Tallinn, Estonia
17:00	Ivanov 6'; Župerka 23' (o.g.); Kuraksin 28'; Šapovalov 57', 67'	Report	10' (pen.) Keršys	Stadium: Sportland Arena; Attendance: 73; Referee: Aleksandrs Anufrijevs

18 November Baltic Cup	Latvia	1–0	Estonia	Valmiera, Latvia
13:00	Sõtšugov 45' (o.g.)	Report		Stadium: Jāņa Daliņa stadions Attendance: 100; Referee: Donatas Šimenas

U19

25 March Friendly	Lithuania	1–0	Estonia	Kaunas, Lithuania
17:00	Perveinis 41' (pen.)	Report		Referee: Kesutis Bartuškevicius

27 March Friendly	Lithuania	0–1	Estonia	Kaunas, Lithuania
12:00		Report	68' Orlov	Attendance: 40; Referee: Mantas Lickus

9 June Baltic Cup	Latvia	7–1	Estonia	Jūrmala, Latvia
16:00	Sackovs 4'; Lizunovs 21'; Melnis 34', 50'; Sliede 45'; Krievinš 52'; Degtjarevs 64'	Report	55' Eerme	Stadium: Slokas Stadium; Attendance: 84; Referee: Kristaps Ratnieks

11 June Baltic Cup	Estonia	1–3	Finland	Riga, Latvia
13:00	Orlov 71'	Report	35' (o.g.) Erints; 37' Kärsämä; 64' Joutjärvi	Stadium: Jāņa Skredeļa Stadium; Referee: Aleksejs Grišcenko

13 June Baltic Cup	Lithuania	1–2	Estonia	Jūrmala, Latvia
12:00	Steponavicius 52'	Report	4' Orlov; 16' Riisenberg	Stadium: Slokas Stadium; Referee: Kristaps Ratnieks

21 September Qualification for the 2023 UEFA EC R1	Italy	0–2	Estonia	Rumia, Poland
12:00		Report	90' Švedovski; 90+3' Õunapuu	Stadium: Stadion Miejski w Rumii; Referee: Arda Kardeşler (Turkey)

24 September Qualification for the 2023 UEFA EC R1	Poland	2–0	Estonia	Gdynia, Poland
17:00	Pleńko 65' (pen.), 68'	Report		Stadium: Stadion Miejski w Gdyni; Referee: Matthew de Gabriele (Malta)

27 September Qualification for the 2023 UEFA EC R1	Estonia	3–2	Bosnia and Herzegovina	Rumia, Poland
13:00	Lehtmets 56'; Luts 86'; Õunapuu 90+4'	Report	25' Kahvić; 30' Prskalo	Stadium: Stadion Miejski w Rumii; Referee: Miloš Milanović (Serbia)

16 November Friendly	Estonia	0–1	Slovakia	Tallinn, Estonia
12:00		Report	48' (o.g.) Kaevats	Stadium: Sportland Arena; Attendance: 48; Referee: Kristjan-Eric Lääne

18 November Friendly	Estonia	0–2	Slovakia	Tallinn, Estonia
12:00		Report	25' Rehuš; 89' Mišovic	Stadium: Sportland Arena; Attendance: 45; Referee: Maksim Ramazanov

U18

21 September Limoges friendly tournament	France	3–0	Estonia	Limoges, France
20:00	Aiki 33' (pen.); Nseke 62'; Bentoumi 90'	Report		Stadium: Stade de Beaublanc; Referee: Lukas Puzilewicz

23 September Limoges friendly tournament	Estonia	0–1	Poland	Limoges, France
17:00		Report	45' Kowalski	Stadium: Stade de Beaublanc

25 September Limoges friendly tournament	Scotland	3–1	Estonia	Limoges, France
19:15	Emerson 21'; Woodcock 35'; Cooper 60', 90'	Report	67' Pajo	Stadium: Stade de Beaublanc

U17

26 February Friendly	Estonia	2–5	Sweden	Marbella, Sweden
16:30 (UTC+3)	Mustmaa 45'; Kolobov 89'	Report	18' De Oliveira; 50' Perez; 86' Tellgren; 90' Lindelöv; 90' Ayari	Stadium: La Quinta Football Fields; Attendance: 50; Referee: Hector Fabio Sarmiento Nuñez

1 March Friendly	Estonia	2–2	Sweden	Marbella, Sweden
15:30 (UTC+3)	Pajo 69' (pen.); Õunpuu 90'	Report	8' Mokédé; 87' De Oliveira	Stadium: La Quinta Football Fields; Attendance: 50; Referee: Luis Espina Dominguez

23 March Qualification for the 2022 UEFA EC	Belgium	8–1	Estonia	Ugljevik, Bosnia and Herzegovina
16:00 (UTC+3)	Fofana 10', 27', 41'; Al Mazyani 44'; Kinsiona 50'; Burlet 56'; Godts 58'; Talbi 88'	Report	40' Mustmaa	Stadium: Novi Gradski Stadion; Referee: Arda Kardeşler (Turkey)

26 March Qualification for the 2022 UEFA EC	Estonia	1–2	Bosnia and Herzegovina	Ugljevik, Bosnia and Herzegovina
16:00 (UTC+3)	Kolobov 27'	Report	19' Rizvanović; 87' Bogdanić	Stadium: Novi Gradski Stadion; Referee: Elchin Masiyev (Azerbaijan)

29 March Qualification for the 2022 UEFA EC	Estonia	0–4	Spain	Ugljevik, Bosnia and Herzegovina
16:00 (UTC+3)		Report	40' Ginés; 57', 61' Casals; 71' Bravo	Stadium: Novi Gradski Stadion; Referee: Arda Kardeşler (Turkey)

26 April Friendly tournament	Estonia	7–2	Faroe Islands	Põlva, Estonia
18:00 (UTC+3)	Kartau 9'; Kalimullin 24', 63', 70'; Rõivassepp 65'; Valdaru 83'; Rebane 90'	Report	68' Klein; 79' Miezan	Stadium: Lootospark; Attendance: 42; Referee: Kristjan-Erik Lääne

28 April Friendly tournament	Kazakhstan	2–2 (7–8 p)	Estonia	Põlva, Estonia
18:00 (UTC+3)	Sautov 58'; Adakhayev 90'	Report	13' Planken; 53' Kalimullin	Stadium: Lootospark; Attendance: 75; Referee: Kristjan Kattus

1 May Friendly tournament	Estonia	5–0	New Caledonia	Põlva, Estonia
15:00 (UTC+3)	Kartau 11'; Jumankin 16'; Kalimullin 34', 56'; Laskov 62'	Report		Stadium: Lootospark; Attendance: 56; Referee: Johann Kuldmäe

29 June Baltic Cup	Lithuania	3–3	Estonia	Eerikkilä, Finland
13:00	Sturys 8'; Kviklys 31'; Jermolajev 90'	Report	39' Jumankin; 55' Rõivassepp; 63' Kerge	Stadium: Jari Litamanen Areena; Referee: Amir Hajizadeh

1 July Baltic Cup	Estonia	3–2	Latvia	Eerikkilä, Finland
17:30	Varjund 5'; Kalimullin 55'; Rõivassepp 84'	Report	2' (pen.), 90' Bocs	Stadium: Jari Litamanen Areena; Referee: Miika Haapakoski

3 July Baltic Cup	Finland	6–0	Estonia	Helsinki, Finland
15:00	Ingman 35' (pen.), 45', 66'; Vauhkonen 39'; Ruoppi 42'; Huovila 81'	Report		Stadium: Töölön Pallokenttä; Attendance: 241; Referee: Amir Hajizadeh

22 September Friendly	Uzbekistan	2–1	Estonia	Qibray, Uzbekistan
12:00 (UTC+3)	Usmonov 9'; Akhmedov 74'	Report	60' Talviste	Stadium: Qibray training arena Referee: Rustam Lutlulin

24 September Unofficial friendly	Bunyodkor's academy	0–2	Estonia	Qibray, Uzbekistan
13:00 (UTC+3)		Report	26' Valdaru; 72' Kalimullin	Stadium: Qibray training arena

26 September Friendly	Uzbekistan	2–3	Estonia	Qibray, Uzbekistan
15:00 (UTC+3)	Usmonov 33'; Mirusmonov 83'	Report	2' Kalimullin; 6' Talviste; 49' Kerge	Stadium: Qibray training arena Attendance: 38; Referee: Edita Mirabidova

26 October Qualification for the 2023 UEFA EC	Belgium	4–1	Estonia	Buftea, Romania
13:00 (UTC+3)	de Meyer 39'; Gérard 62'; di Matteo 82'; Bounida 87'	Report	78' Kalimullin	Stadium: Football Centre FRF; Referee: Henrik Nalbandyan (Armenia)

29 October Qualification for the 2023 UEFA EC	Denmark	8–0	Estonia	Buftea, Romania
13:00 (UTC+3)	Chiakha 5', 27', 28'; Jensen 39'; Jørgensen 46'; Andersen 62'; Mikkelsen 87', 89' (pen.)	Report		Stadium: Football Centre FRF; Referee: Daniel Schlager (Germany)

1 November Qualification for the 2023 UEFA EC	Estonia	2–4	Romania	Buftea, Romania
15:00 (UTC+3)	Suppi 9'; Kalimullin 48'	Report	25', 34' Tarbă; 45' Păcuraru; 88' Cocoș	Stadium: Football Centre FRF; Referee: Miloš Savović (Montenegro)

U16

20 April Unofficial friendly	Southern Finland	1–2	Estonia	Helsinki, Finland
14:00 (UTC+3)	Koukkumäki 45'	Report	6' Lohmatov; 13' Varjund	Stadium: Töölön Pallokenttä; Referee: Emil Kohvakka

16 August Unofficial friendly	Estonia	3–1	Southern Finland	Tallinn, Estonia
12:30 (UTC+3)	Lohmatov 39'; Kippar 64', 82'	Report	35' Pastinen	Stadium: TNTK Stadium; Attendance: 59; Referee: Martti Pukk

14 September Unofficial friendly	Estonia	5–3	Saxony	Tallinn, Estonia
12:30 (UTC+3)	Belyavskiy , 2' (o.g.); Lohmatov 11', 37', 45'; Eenmaa 65'	Report	6' Gebel; 44' Ullmann; 69' Weber	Stadium: TNTK Stadium; Attendance: 44; Referee: Joonas Jaanovits

16 September Unofficial friendly	Estonia	3–4	Saxony	Tallinn, Estonia
12:30 (UTC+3)	Puu 36'; Eenmaa 76'; Lohmatov 80' (pen.)	Report	9' (pen.) Jahn V; 27' Bränning; 40' Wagner; 52' Belyavskiy	Stadium: TNTK Stadium; Attendance: 32; Referee: Kristjan-Eric Lääne

6 October Friendly	Estonia	1–3	Northern Ireland	Eerikkilä, Finland
12:00 (UTC+3)	Kristal 9'	Report	31' Burnside; 34' Atherton; 80' Kelly	Stadium: Jari Litamanen Areena; Attendance: 45; Referee: Remi Rantakaulio

7 October Friendly	Finland	6–2	Estonia	Eerikkilä, Finland
11:00 (UTC+3)	Ketola 20', 73', 75', 81'; Koukkumäki 76'; Mero 86' (pen.)	Report	9' Liivaru; 90' Kristal	Stadium: Jari Litamanen Areena; Attendance: 60; Referee: Turo Veini

U15

18 August Friendly tournament	Lithuania	4–0	Estonia	Tallinn, Estonia
18:00 (UTC+3)	Mažeika 13'; Lukas 51', 58'; Pukevicius 64'	Report		Stadium: TNTK Stadium; Attendance: 137; Referee: Priit Alekask

20 August Friendly tournament	Estonia	0–4	Bulgaria	Tallinn, Estonia
18:00 (UTC+3)		Report	38', 40', 42' Mrankov; 51' Goryanov	Stadium: TNTK Stadium; Attendance: 133; Referee: Karl Kena

=== Women ===
==== Senior ====
The national women's team continued their 2023 FIFA World Cup qualification campaign. On 16 December 2021, the Estonian FA declared that Jarmo Matikainen will step down as the head coach of the Estonian women's national football team. On 18 January, the Estonian FA announced that the women's national team will have two head coaches: Anastassia Morkovkina and Sirje Roops.

Although Estonians lost 0–9 to France at home, they also managed to win two games against Kazakhstan. In October they managed to win the Baltic Cup after five successive tournaments without a title.

20 February Unofficial friendly	Åland United	4–0	Estonia	Mariehamn, Finland
17:00 (UTC+3)	Hagström 44', 55'; Ulenius 61'; Sousa 85'	Report		Stadium: Wiklöf Holding Arena; Referee: Adrian Alin Stoia

23 February Unofficial friendly	Åland United	1–4	Estonia	Mariehamn, Finland
18:30 (UTC+3)	Loferski 64'	Report	34' Kubassova; 69' (o.g.) Bozic; 79' Tammik; 90' (pen.) Raadik	Stadium: Wiklöf Holding Arena; Referee: Mattias Gestranius

8 April Qualification for the 2023 FIFA WC	Estonia	1–3	Greece	Tallinn, Estonia
19:00 (UTC+3)	Himanen 63'	Report (FIFA); Report (UEFA)	14', 21' Kongouli; 76' Sarri	Stadium: Lilleküla Stadium; Attendance: 435; Referee: Lucie Šulcová (Czech Republic)

12 April Qualification for the 2023 FIFA WC	Greece	3–0	Estonia	Patras, Greece
20:00 (UTC+3)	Sarri 19'; Kongouli 48'; Pouliou 74'	Report (FIFA); Report (UEFA)		Stadium: Pampeloponnisiako Stadium; Referee: Simona Ghisletta (Switzerland)

28 June Qualification for the 2023 FIFA WC	Estonia	4–2	Kazakhstan	Pärnu, Estonia
19:00 (UTC+3)	Saar 61', 88'; Himanen 71'; Tammik 90+5'	Report (FIFA); Report (UEFA)	37' Turlybekova; 52' Bortnikova	Stadium: Pärnu Rannastaadion; Attendance: 267; Referee: Silvia Gasperotti (Italy)

2 September Qualification for the 2023 FIFA WC	Estonia	0–9	France	Tallinn, Estonia
18:00 (UTC+3)		Report (FIFA); Report (UEFA)	6' Cascarino; 17' (pen.) Dali; 24', 29', 45', 47' Sarr; 59' (pen.), 67' Matéo; 83' Geyoro	Stadium: Lilleküla Stadium; Attendance: 862; Referee: Silvia Domingos (Portugal)

6 September Qualification for the 2023 FIFA WC	Kazakhstan	0–2	Estonia	Karaganda, Kazakhstan
16:00 (UTC+3)		Report (FIFA); Report (UEFA)	8' (o.g.) Demidova; 17' Saar	Stadium: Shakhter Stadium; Referee: Liudmyla Telbukh (Ukraine)

6 October Baltic Cup SF	Estonia	4–1	Lithuania	Tartu, Estonia
19:00 (UTC+3)	Tammik 12'; Bannikova 28'; Kubassova 72', 75'	Report	86' Partikaitė	Stadium: Tamme Stadium; Attendance: 222; Referee: Viola Raudzina (Latvia)

9 October Baltic Cup F	Faroe Islands	1–3	Estonia	Tartu, Estonia
19:00 (UTC+3)	Zlidnis 55' (o.g.)	Report	19' Tammik; 60' Kubassova; 77' Merisalu	Stadium: Tamme Stadium; Attendance: 164; Referee: Sarah Fatemeh Zangeneh (Norway)

10 November Friendly	Montenegro	1–1	Estonia	Bar, Montenegro
13:00 (UTC+3)	Popović 53'	Report	16' Lillemäe	Stadium: Stadion Topolica; Attendance: 200; Referee: Merima Čelik (Bosnia and Herzegovina)

14 November Friendly	Montenegro	1–2	Estonia	Bar, Montenegro
13:00 (UTC+3)	Dešić 10'	Report	16' Bannikova; 70' (o.g.) Maraš	Stadium: Stadion Topolica; Attendance: 100; Referee: Merima Čelik (Bosnia and Herzegovina)

==== Youth ====
U19

On 9 December 2021, the women's national U19 team were placed in pot C in the draw for the qualification round of the 2022 U19 EUROs. The Estonians were placed into the same group as Scotland, Kosovo and Kazakhstan.

21 March Friendly	Estonia	0–0	Latvia	Tallinn, Estonia
12:00 (UTC+3)		Report		Stadium: EJL Sisehall; Referee: Triinu Vaher

5 April Qualification for the 2022 UEFA EC	Estonia	1–2	Kosovo	Edinburgh, Scotland
15:00 (UTC+3)	Saulus 75'	Report	45' Lulaj; 52' Berisha	Stadium: Ainslie Park; Referee: Jurgita Mačikunytė (Lithuania)

8 April Qualification for the 2022 UEFA EC	Scotland	7–1	Estonia	Edinburgh, Scotland
15:00	Hutchison 20'; Staalfeldt 27' (o.g.); Anderson 47'; Thomson 62'; Lister 64'; Pollard 84'; Adams 86'	Report	14' Hüdsi	Stadium: Ainslie Park; Referee: Fatemeh Zangeneh

11 April Qualification for the 2022 UEFA EC	Kazakhstan	1–0	Estonia	Edinburgh, Scotland
15:00	Balzhan 13'	Report		Stadium: Ainslie Park; Referee: Gamze Durmus

5 July Baltic Cup	Latvia	1–1	Estonia	Jonava, Lithuania
15:00 (UTC+3)	Vuškane 74'	Report	71' Lilles	Stadium: Jonava stadium Attendance: 40; Referee: Egidijus Amšiejus

6 July Baltic Cup	Estonia	2–3	Lithuania	Jonava, Lithuania
15:00 (UTC+3)	Teern 30', 32' (pen.)	Report	22', 70', 85' Kriauciunaite	Stadium: Jonava stadium Attendance: 70; Referee: Mindaugas Jackus

1 September Friendly	Faroe Islands	0–4	Estonia	Eiði, Faroe Islands
20:00 (UTC+3)		Report	13' Rannasto; 17' Sigijane; 43' Teern; 56' Kirpu	Stadium: Eiði Stadium; Referee: Hogni Madsen

3 September Friendly	Faroe Islands	4–1	Estonia	Tórshavn, Faroe Islands
18:00 (UTC+3)	Johansen 44'; Olsen 47'; Törarenni 75'; Haraldsen 88'	Report	56' Lillemets	Stadium: Tórsvøllur; Referee: Annfinn Hjatalin

8 October Qualification for the 2023 UEFA EC	Moldova	5–1	Estonia	Bijeljina, Bosnia and Herzegovina
15:30	Manoil 47', 88', 90+4'; Colnic 60', 66'	Report	45' Teern	Stadium: Stadium Etno Selo Stanišići; Referee: Jurgita Mačikunytė (Lithuania)

11 October Qualification for the 2023 UEFA EC	Estonia	2–7	Bosnia and Herzegovina	Bijeljina, Bosnia and Herzegovina
15:30	Kirpu 60'; Teern 75'	Report	16', 27', 29' (pen.) Jelčić; 24' (o.g.) Joandi; 55' (o.g.) Kreuz; 67' Filipović; 81' Lepanović	Stadium: Stadium Etno Selo Stanišići; Referee: Michalina Diakow (Poland)

U17

On 9 December 2021, the women's national U17 team were placed in pot B in the draw for the qualification round of the 2022 U17 EUROs. The Estonians were placed into the same group as Bulgaria and Georgia.

9 February Friendly	Italy	8–1	Estonia	Novara, Italy
15:30 (UTC+3)	Bernardi 15', 17'; Schatzer 32' (pen.); Dragoni 45', 56'; Cesarini 58'; Sorelli 64'; Fanelli 87'	Report	54' Mirjam	Stadium: Stadio Silvio Piola; Referee: Silvia Gasparotti

11 February Friendly	Italy	7–0	Estonia	Novara, Italy
11:30 (UTC+3)	Bernardi 2', 54'; Moretti 20', 30'; Dragoni 45', 47'; Schatzer 78' (pen.)	Report	54' Mirjam	Stadium: Stadio Silvio Piola; Referee: Deborah Bianchi

16 March Qualification for the 2022 UEFA EC	Bulgaria	3–4	Estonia	Sliven, Bulgaria
14:30 (UTC+3)	Genova 23'; Cwetkowa 27'; Demirova 51'	Report	36' Sarapik; 55', 90' Grutop; 87' Lilles	Stadium: Stadion Hadzhi Dimitar; Referee: Jelena Jermolajeva

19 March Qualification for the 2022 UEFA EC	Estonia	5–2	Georgia	Sliven, Bulgaria
14:30 (UTC+3)	Välba 2'; Orlova 11', 16', 74'; Volkov 35'	Report	34' (pen.) Bukhrikidze; 47' Ambalia	Stadium: Stadion Hadzhi Dimitar; Referee: Merima Celik

5 April Friendly tournament	Estonia	1–2	Finland	Tallinn, Estonia
18:00 (UTC+3)	Grutop 63'	Report	18' Ebnezer; 80' Oksanen	Stadium: EJL Sisehall; Attendance: 33; Referee: Terke Kram

7 April Friendly tournament	Estonia	1–0	Armenia	Tallinn, Estonia
18:00 (UTC+3)	Borotõnskaja 42'	Report		Stadium: EJL Sisehall; Referee: Karolin Kaivoja

10 April Friendly tournament	Latvia	1–5	Estonia	Tallinn, Estonia
17:00 (UTC+3)	Kala 32' (o.g.)	Report	6' Kala; 9', 24' Grutop; 50' (pen.), 67' (pen.) Orlova	Stadium: EJL Sisehall; Attendance: 101; Referee: Terke Kram

5 July Baltic Cup	Latvia	2–0	Estonia	Birštonas, Lithuania
12:00 (UTC+3)	Preijere 80'; Upite 90'	Report		Stadium: Birštonas stadium Referee: Edgaras Bucinskas

6 July Baltic Cup	Estonia	2–1	Lithuania	Birštonas, Lithuania
12:00 (UTC+3)	Grutop 42'; Kurg 58'	Report	13' Medvedeva	Stadium: Birštonas stadium Referee: Lina Skladaityte

3 September Friendly	Estonia	1–2	Poland	Tallinn, Estonia
13:00 (UTC+3)	Grutop 40'	Report	28' Gutowska; 70' Henning	Stadium: TNTK stadium Attendance: 52; Referee: Luisa Klaar

5 September Friendly	Estonia	0–6	Poland	Tallinn, Estonia
11:00 (UTC+3)		Report	11' Grzywinska; 19' Gliszcynska; 26' Dubiel; 44' Musialowska; 59' Jagodzinska; 80' (o.g.) Smirnova	Stadium: TNTK stadium Attendance: 19; Referee: Katariina Järve

7 October Qualification for the 2023 UEFA EC	Denmark	7–0	Estonia	Tallinn, Estonia
18:00 (UTC+3)	Kaihøj 16'; Aagaard 37'; Nielsen 54'; Saini 63', 78'; Holt 83'; Lerche 90+3'	Report		Stadium: Lilleküla Stadium; Attendance: 109; Referee: Gamze Durmuş (Turkey)

10 October Qualification for the 2023 UEFA EC	England	3–0	Estonia	Tallinn, Estonia
18:00 (UTC+3)	Baker 44'; Brown 89'; Earl 90+1'	Report		Stadium: Lilleküla Stadium; Attendance: 144; Referee: Merima Čelik (Bosnia and Herzegovina)

13 October Qualification for the 2023 UEFA EC	Estonia	0–0	Ukraine	Tallinn, Estonia
13:30 (UTC+3)		Report		Stadium: Lilleküla Stadium; Attendance: 90; Referee: Gamze Durmuş (Turkey)

18 November Friendly	Finland	7–0	Estonia	Tammela, Finland
14:30 (UTC+3)	Lahikainen 6'; Ulenius 27', 47'; Råtts 49', 51'; Holmström 64', 86'	Report		Stadium: Eerikkilä stadium Attendance: 51; Referee: Lotta Vuorio

U15

24 August Baltic Cup	Estonia	1–1	Faroe Islands	Riga, Latvia
18:00 (UTC+3)	Južaninova 49'	Report	76' Benjaminsen	Stadium: Daugavgrīva stadium Attendance: 26; Referee: Liga Distrine

25 August Baltic Cup	Lithuania	1–2	Estonia	Riga, Latvia
18:00 (UTC+3)	Malakauskaite 79'	Report	28' Orlova; 54' Južaninova	Stadium: Daugavgrīva stadium Attendance: 15; Referee: Liga Didrike

27 August Baltic Cup	Estonia	1–1	Latvia	Riga, Latvia
14:00 (UTC+3)	Uzjukina 14'	Report	39' Andersone	Stadium: Jānis Skredelis' stadium Attendance: 137; Referee: Tatjana Lavrentika

12 November Friendly tournament	Estonia	1–0	Greece	Kamëz, Albania
14:30 (UTC+3)	Treilop 4'	Report		Stadium: National Sports Centre; Referee: Disela Lekgegaj

14 November Friendly tournament	Andorra	0–1	Estonia	Kamëz, Albania
14:30 (UTC+3)		Report	74' Uzjukina	Stadium: National Sports Centre; Referee: Englantina Pjetrushaj

17 November Friendly tournament	Albania	0–7	Estonia	Kamëz, Albania
13:00 (UTC+3)		Report	1', 34' Treilop; 17' Kaalma; 32' Männiste; 35' Južaninova; 40' Orlova; 58' Gross	Stadium: National Sports Centre; Referee: Mirela Cemeri

=== Futsal ===
==== Senior ====
26 January Friendly	Andorra	5–1	Estonia	Andorra la Vella, Andorra
21:00 (UTC+3)	Massana 1'; Segura 26'; Regalo 27'; Rodriguez 31', 40'	Report	20' Rubel	Stadium: Serradells Sports Centre; Referee: Javier Moreno

27 January Friendly	Andorra	3–2	Estonia	Andorra la Vella, Andorra
21:00 (UTC+3)	Rodriguez 25'; Rodrigues 31'; Debboun 36'	Report	14', 40' Babjak	Stadium: Serradells Sports Centre; Referee: Pablo Delgado

11 March Friendly	Malta	1–4	Estonia	Pembroke, Malta
22:00 (UTC+3)	Azzopardi 7'	Report	22', 29' Naal; 24' Vnukov; 33' Babjak	Stadium: National Sport School; Referee: Clinton Cassar

12 March Friendly	Malta	0–4	Estonia	Pembroke, Malta
14:00 (UTC+3)		Report	7' Rubel; 18' Ed. Stüf; 28', 37' Naal	Stadium: National Sport School

6 April Qualification for the 2024 WC	Greece	5–2	Estonia	Chișinău, Moldova
16:00 (UTC+3)	Ntatis 5'; Manos 7'; Tsinas 12'; Karambelas 22', 31'	Report	7' Vnukov; 18' Laas	Stadium: FMF Futsal Arena; Referee: Dejan Veselic (Slovenia)

7 April Qualification for the 2024 WC	Moldova	2–0	Estonia	Chișinău, Moldova
19:00 (UTC+3)	Laşcu 13'; A. Negara 18'	Report		Stadium: FMF Futsal Arena; Referee: Maximilian Alkofer (Germany)

9 April Qualification for the 2024 WC	Estonia	3–9	Switzerland	Chișinău, Moldova
16:00 (UTC+3)	Savikink 14'; Vnukov 32', 35'	Report	3' Florin; 6', 13' Qerfozi; 9' Spiegel; 23', 30' Marcoyannakis; 29' (o.g.) Naal; 33' Gössi; 36' (o.g.) Pulkkinen	Stadium: FMF Futsal Arena; Referee: Juan Boelen (Belgium)

23 September Friendly	Estonia	1–1	Malta	Tallinn, Estonia
16:00 (UTC+3)	Naal 28'	Report	2' Sammut	Stadium: Kalev Sports Hall; Referee: Grigori Ošomkov

=== Beach ===
15 March Friendly	Portugal	10–0	Estonia	Sesimbra, Portugal
18:30 (UTC+3)	Léo Martins 9', 31', 34'; Bê Martins 12', 35'; Santos 12'; Brilhante 20', 22'; Andrade 24'; Pintado 32'	Report		Stadium: Praia do Ouro; Referee: Sergio Soares

16 March Friendly	Portugal	6–2	Estonia	Sesimbra, Portugal
19:00 (UTC+3)	Santos 16', 21'; Léo Martins 23'; Brilhante 29'; Lopes 36'; Pinhal 36'	Report	3' Munskind; 3' Lepik	Stadium: Praia do Ouro; Referee: Francisco Costa

1 July EBSL Division A	Portugal	8–1	Estonia	Nazaré, Portugal
17:45 (UTC+3)	Léo Martins 15', 22', 28'; Bê Martins 17'; Lourenço 25', 26'; Pintado 28' (pen.), 36'	Report	1' Nõmmiko	Stadium: Estádio do Viveiro; Referee: Csaba Baghy (Hungary)

2 July EBSL Division A	Estonia	2–7	Poland	Nazaré, Portugal
15:00 (UTC+3)	Lepik 1', 32'	Report	2', 7', 23', 34' Petrasiak; 5', 12' Ziober; 27' Witkowski	Stadium: Estádio do Viveiro; Referee: Francisco Bumedien (Spain)

8 September EBSL Division A	Switzerland	5–3	Estonia	Cagliari, Italy
11:00 (UTC+3)	W.Tchatat 6'; Ott 9', 23'; Stankovic 22', 32'	Report	19' Lepik; 29' Er. Stüf; 30' Mäeorg	Stadium: Palm Beach; Referee: Francisco de Oses Bumedien (Spain)

9 September EBSL Division A	France	6–3	Estonia	Cagliari, Italy
11:00 (UTC+3)	Barbotti 7', 28', 30'; Bru 7', 33'; Basquaise 23'	Report	2', 36' Lepik; 23' Er. Stüf	Stadium: Palm Beach; Referee: Moreno Longo (Italy)

== League system ==
=== Men ===
==== Premium liiga ====
The 2022 season of Premium liiga was originally supposed to have top nine clubs from the previous season in addition to Esiliiga champions Maardu Linnameeskond. But on two separate occasions two clubs - Viljandi Tulevik, who finished 8th in 2021, and Maardu Linnameeskond, who were the reigning Esiliiga champions - released a statement, where they confirmed that they will give up their place in the top division and due to financial problems play in the lower divisions. While Tulevik joined Esiliiga, Maardu decided to compete in II liiga. This therefore gave another opportunity to Pärnu Vaprus, who finished last season tenth, and Tallinna Kalev, who was second in Esiliiga, to compete in the Premium liiga. A few days before the beginning of the season, the Estonian FA announced that Tallinna Legion would receive -4 points and a transfer ban for missing multiple licensing dates.

The season ended with Tallinna Flora winning its 14th title. In the end, they were 18 points ahead of second-placed Tallinna Levadia, which is the largest gap between the top two teams in Meistriliiga since 2009. In addition, no team has ever gained more points in a season than Flora did in 2022. While Levadia finished second, Paide managed to get ahead of Kalju in the penultimate round by beating them 1–0. The season was also historical for fifth-placed Kuressaare who had never finished higher than the seventh place. Likewise, newcomer Tallinna Kalev had not received as many points as they did in 2022 since 2007. At first Pärnu Vaprus, who finished last, was supposed to be relegated to Esiliiga but after Tallinna Legion announced that due to financial difficulties they will play in Esiliiga, Vaprus got readmitted to the division.

FCI Levadia's Zakaria Beglarishvili was the division's top scorer with 21 goals. The top assister was Tallinna Kalev's Ioan Yakovlev, who managed to assist 13 goals. Flora's Konstantin Vassiljev was given the Meistriliiga Player of the Year trophy. In addition Paide's Robi Saarma was named as the Fans Player of the Year by Soccernet.ee readers.

Pos	Team	Pld	W	D	L	GF	GA	GD	Pts	Promotion, qualification or relegation
1	Tallinna Flora (C)	36	31	4	1	94	21	+73	97	Qualification for the Champions League first qualifying round
2	Tallinna Levadia	36	24	7	5	74	25	+49	79	Qualification for the Europa Conference League first qualifying round
3	Paide Linnameeskond	36	19	8	9	84	37	+47	65	Qualification for the Europa Conference League first qualifying round
4	Nõmme Kalju	36	19	8	9	59	30	+29	65	
5	Kuressaare	36	13	11	12	49	51	−2	50	
6	Tartu Tammeka	36	10	9	17	38	57	−19	39	
7	Narva Trans	36	10	8	18	43	58	−15	38	
8	Tallinna Kalev	36	10	5	21	42	92	−50	35	
9	Tallinna Legion (R)	36	6	8	22	34	82	−48	22 (Note: Tallinna Legion were deducted 4 points for missing multiple licensing dates.)	Relegation to the Esiliiga (Note: On 24 December, Tallinna Legion, who finished 9th in 2022, released a statement, where they confirmed that they will give up their place in the top division and will play in Esiliiga due to financial problems. Therefore tenth-placed Pärnu Vaprus got readmitted to the league.)
10	Pärnu Vaprus	36	3	2	31	32	96	−64	11	Readmitted to the league

Source: EJL
Rules for classification: 1) Points; 2) Less matches awarded against; 3) Head-to-head points; 4) Head-to-head goal difference; 5) Matches won; 6) Goal difference; 7) Goals scored; 8) Away goals scored; 9) Fairplay ranking.
(C) Champions; (R) Relegated
Notes:
Locations of the 2022 Meistriliiga teams

Relegation play-off:

Team 1	Agg.	Team 2	1st leg	2nd leg
Elva (Esiliiga 3rd)	1-3	Tallinna Legion (Meistriliiga 9th)	0-3	1-0

==== Esiliiga ====
The 2022 season of Esiliiga had six competitors from last years Esiliiga and four newcomers. While last year's champion Maardu Linnameeskond got promoted to Premium liiga, the top divisions eight team - Viljandi Tulevik - was relegated due to financial difficulties. The other three teams all came from Esiliiga B: Viimsi and Harju Laagri will be debuting in the second division, whereas Ida-Virumaa Alliance returns after spending one year in Esiliiga B. They replace Tartu Welco, Tartu Tammeka U21 and Pärnu, who got relegated after last season. On 4 February Maardu Linnameeskond announced that due to financial difficulties they also cannot compete in the top division. Unlike Viljandi, they decided to compete in II liiga and therefore Tallinna Kalev got promoted and Pärnu got readmitted to Esiliiga.

In the penultimate round newcomer Harju Laagri defeated Pärnu 4:0, which crowned them champions of the division. FCI Levadia's reserve team finished second with 68 points and Elva completed the podium with the third place. On the other end of the table Pärnu and Viljandi Tulevik got relegated to Esiliiga B. The promotion/relegation play-offs did not add any new teams to the division because while Elva lost its promotion play-off to Tallinna Legion, Ida-Virumaa Alliance managed to narrowly beat Esiliiga B-s third-best Tallinna Kalev U21.

The best goalscorer was Nõmme United's 17-year-old Egert Õunapuu, who got 36 goals in 26 games. The young attacker was later named the best player of the season beating both Levadia U21's Daniel Luts and Harju Laagri's Roman Sobtšenko.

Pos	Team	Pld	W	D	L	GF	GA	GD	Pts	Promotion, qualification or relegation
1	Harju Laagri (C, P)	36	24	4	8	97	46	+51	76	Promotion to the Meistriliiga
2	Tallinna Levadia U21 (Note: Reserve teams are ineligible for promotion.)	36	21	5	10	85	45	+40	68	
3	Elva	36	20	6	10	76	52	+24	66	Qualification for the promotion play-offs
4	Viimsi	36	20	3	13	76	40	+36	63	
5	Tallinna Flora U21	36	19	5	12	88	52	+36	62	
6	Nõmme United	36	18	6	12	79	56	+23	60	
7	Paide Linnameeskond U21	36	17	1	18	75	88	−13	52	
8	Ida-Virumaa Alliance	36	8	3	25	29	105	−76	27	Qualification for the relegation play-offs
9	Viljandi Tulevik (R)	36	6	5	25	28	102	−74	23	Relegation to the Esiliiga B
10	Pärnu (R)	36	4	8	24	30	77	−47	20	Relegation to the Esiliiga B

Source: EJL
Rules for classification: 1) Points; 2) Less matches awarded against; 3) Head-to-head points; 4) Head-to-head goal difference; 5) Matches won; 6) Goal difference; 7) Goals scored; 8) Away goals scored; 9) Fairplay ranking.
(C) Champions; (P) Promoted; (R) Relegated
Notes:
Locations of the 2022 Esiliiga teams

Relegation play-off:

Team 1	Agg.	Team 2	1st leg	2nd leg
Tallinna Kalev U21 (Esiliiga B 3rd)	3-4	Ida-Virumaa Alliance (Esiliiga 8th)	3-3	0-1

==== Esiliiga B ====
In comparison to the previous year, the tenth season of Esiliiga B had five new clubs in the division. While Viimsi, Harju Laagri and Ida-Virumaa Alliance got promoted, they are replaced by Tartu Welco, Tartu Tammeka U21 and Pärnu, who join the division after spending respectively one, three and two season in Esiliiga. On the other side of the table, Vändra Vaprus and Nõmme Kalju U21, who had spent the last nine years in the top three divisions, got relegated to II liiga. They were replaced by debutants Raplamaa and Tartu Kalev. On 4 February Maardu Linnameeskond announced that due to financial difficulties they cannot compete in the top division. Due to them deciding to play in the II liiga, Nõmme Kalju U21, who finished the previous year second to last, got readmitted to Esiliiga B and Pärnu JK, who was relegated due to losing the relegation play-offs, was also readmitted to Esiliiga.

Within the first few months Tabasalu managed to separate itself from the other teams. Slowly, FC Tallinn, who did not lose any of their last 27 games, joined them at the top. The champion of the division was crowned in the last round, when the top two teams went head-to-head. Tallinn, who had to win the game, went ahead on the 8th minute and held on to the lead for almost the whole match: Tabasalu got their first goal on the 90th minute. A few moments later Tallinn scored another goal, which gave them the divisions title in the presence of 381 spectators. While Tabasalu and Tallinn were promoted to Esiliiga, Raplamaa, who had the least amount of points in Esiliiga B's history, and Nõmme Kalju U21 got relegated to II liiga.

FC Tallinn's 16-year-old Maksim Kalimullin finished the season as the best goalscorer with 33 goals in 29 games. The second-best goalscorer, Tabasalu's Tristan Pajo, was voted as the player of the season, beating both Kalimullin and Tallinna Kalev U21's Kenlou Laasner.

Pos	Team	Pld	W	D	L	GF	GA	GD	Pts	Promotion, qualification or relegation
1	Tallinn (P)	36	24	9	3	117	38	+79	81	Promotion to the Esiliiga
2	Tabasalu (P)	36	25	4	7	120	50	+70	79	Promotion to the Esiliiga
3	Tallinna Kalev U21	36	20	8	8	88	48	+40	68	Qualification for the promotion play-offs
4	Tartu Welco	36	17	10	9	68	47	+21	61	
5	Tartu Tammeka U21	36	16	8	12	70	59	+11	56	
6	Tallinna Legion U21	36	13	3	20	60	86	−26	42	Qualification for the relegation play-offs (Note: Tallinna Legion U21 had to play in the Esiliiga B relegation play-offs due to the fact that the 2023 Esiliiga's (Esiliiga and Esiliiga B) already had seven U21 or U19 teams in the divisions and the league's rulebook allows only eight reserve teams in the divisions. Therefore, the eighth and final team would be determined by the relegation play-off between Tallinna Legion U21 and Tallinna Flora U19.)
7	Tartu Kalev	36	11	7	18	55	81	−26	40	
8	Läänemaa	36	10	7	19	49	84	−35	37	
9	Nõmme Kalju U21 (R)	36	11	3	22	54	100	−46	36	Relegation to the II liiga
10	Raplamaa (R)	36	2	3	31	33	121	−88	9	Relegation to the II liiga

Source: EJL
Rules for classification: 1) Points; 2) Less matches awarded against; 3) Head-to-head points; 4) Head-to-head goal difference; 5) Matches won; 6) Goal difference; 7) Goals scored; 8) Away goals scored; 9) Fairplay ranking.
(P) Promoted; (R) Relegated
Notes:
Locations of the 2022 Esiliiga B teams

Relegation play-off:

Team 1	Agg.	Team 2	1st leg	2nd leg
— (II N/E 2nd)	—	Tallinna Flora U19 (II S/W 3rd)	—	—

Team 1	Agg.	Team 2	1st leg	2nd leg
Tallinna Flora U19 (II league p-o winner)	1–4	Tallinna Legion U21 (Esiliiga B 6th)	0–3	1–2

==== II liiga ====
Locations of the 2022 II liiga teams

On 16 December 2021, it was decided that due to the last season being cancelled prematurely, the two II liiga divisions will have 16 clubs in 2022 instead of the usual 14 teams. Therefore, no teams were relegated and the four III liiga champions were promoted. One month later, the Estonian FA announced that the earlier plan had been repealed. The season starts on 26 March and consists of 26 rounds. Reserve teams, which do not have "U21" or "U19" in their name, are ineligible for promotion.

North / East
The North/East division had little change in comparison to the previous year: only two new clubs have entered the league: the promoted Tartu Kalev was replaced by III liiga East's second-placed Jõhvi Phoenix, who will be debuting in II liiga, and Põhja-Tallinna Volta, who held last place when the previous season had been stopped, went to II liiga S/W, whereas Viimsi II will try their luck in the II liiga N/E. On 4 February Maardu Linnameeskond announced that due to financial difficulties they cannot compete in the top division. Therefore, they decided to take their reserve teams place in II liiga, while the reserve team was disbanded. Two weeks after the news containing Maardu Linnameeskond, the FA announced that Lasnamäe Ajax would be transferred to II liiga S/W and FC Tallinn U21 will get promoted after finishing the previous season in III liiga West third.

South / West
For the second year in a row Kose, who was in the bottom two, managed to get readmitted to the league. Instead, 10th placed Raasiku Joker, who had been in II liiga or higher since 2013, and Rummu Dünamo decided against taking part of the 2022 II liiga. In addition, Viimsi II, Viljandi Tulevik U21 (dissolved) and Raplamaa (promoted to Esiliiga B) also left the division. These four teams were replaced by Nõmme Kalju U21, Vändra Vaprus (both relegated from Esiliiga B), Nõmme United U21 and Harju Laagri U21 (both at the top of III liiga West). Kuressaare and Pärnu Vaprus had their reserve teams change their names from "II" to "U21" for them to be eligible for promotion. On 4 February Maardu Linnameeskond announced that due to financial difficulties they cannot compete in the top division. Therefore, due to them deciding to play in II liiga, Nõmme Kalju U21 was readmitted to Esiliiga B. A few weeks later, the FA announced that in addition to Nõmme Kalju U21 getting promoted, Põhja-Tallinna Volta decided against playing in the fourth tier. That gave an opportunity to Tabasalu U21, who finished the previous season's III West season fourth.

Group A (North & East)
Pos	Team	Pld	Pts
1	FCI Tallinn (C)	26	63
2	Rakvere Tarvas	26	58
3	Narva Trans U21 (P)	26	51
4	Maardu Linnameeskond	26	49
5	Tartu Welco II	26	46
6	Jõgeva Noorus-96	26	41
7	Võru Helios	26	37
8	Viimsi II	26	31
9	Jõhvi Phoenix	26	28
10	Sillamäe Kalev	26	27
11	Tallinn U21	26	27
12	Tartu Helios	26	24
13	Ida-Virumaa Alliance U21 (R)	26	21
14	Elva II (R)	26	20

Source: EJL
(C) Champions; (P) Promoted; (R) Relegated

Group B (South & West)
Pos	Team	Pld	Pts
1	Paide Linnameeskond III (C)	26	71
2	Kuressaare U21 (P)	26	56
3	Tallinna Flora U19	26	55
4	Pärnu Vaprus U21	26	44
5	Harju Laagri U21	26	43
6	Hiiumaa & Läänemaa II	26	42
7	Vändra Vaprus	26	40
8	Saue	26	36
9	Nõmme United U21	26	34
10	Tabasalu U21	26	32
11	Lasnamäe Ajax	26	23
12	Keila	26	18
13	Kose (R)	26	14
14	Tallinna Piraaja (R)	26	12

Source: EJL
(C) Champions; (P) Promoted; (R) Relegated

Champion's match:

5 November Final	Paide Linnameeskond III	3–4	FCI Tallinn	Paide, Estonia
15:30 UTC+03	Puhke 68'; Jevdokimov 82' (pen.); Naris 90+2'	Report	36', 45' Vtorushin; 61' Tšernjakov; 62' Šved	Stadium: Paide kunstmuruväljak Attendance: 53; Referee: Priit Alekask

Relegation play-off:

Team 1	Agg.	Team 2	1st leg	2nd leg
Saku Sporting (III N 6th)	w/o	— (III E 2nd)	—	—
Saku Sporting (play-off winner)	2–7	Tartu Helios (II N/E 12th)	1–4	1–3

Team 1	Agg.	Team 2	1st leg	2nd leg
Pärnu Poseidon (III W 3rd)	8–4	Tartu Kalev II (III S 2nd)	4–4	4–0
Pärnu Poseidon (play-off winner)	1–6	Keila (II S/W 12th)	1–1	0–5

==== III liiga ====
Locations of the 2022 III liiga teams

The III liiga's competition format is the same as in the previous seasons. Each group has eleven or twelve competitors from which the first club gets promoted to II liiga and the second-placed team takes part in the promotion play-offs, where North - East and South - West go head-to-head. The winners from both pairs go against the 12th teams in II liiga. The clubs, which finish the year 11th and 12th, get relegated to IV liiga. The 10th team takes part of the relegation play-offs. As usual, reserve teams, which have their main team in II liiga, are ineligible for promotion. These teams are Tartu Welco X (South), Rakvere Tarvas II (East) and Tallinna Flora IV (West). The season starts on 9 April.

Group A (North)
The 2022 III liiga North division had two newcomers: the previous season's IV liiga champion Tallinna Wolves and second-placed Tallinna Olympic Olybet - who was most recently in the league in 2019 - will replace Tallinna Dünamo, who did not enter the league system this year. In addition, Tallinna Pocarr changed its name to Tallinna Cosmos.

Group B (South)
The South group had only one new team in the division: Tartu Kalev entered its reserve team to the competition. Due to two clubs leaving - Paide Linnameeskond IV and Viljandi Tulevik III - the division only had eleven entrants. There was also one name change: Põhja-Sakala changed its name back to Suure-Jaani United.

Group C (East)
III liiga East division had five newcomers. While Põhja-Tallinna Volta and Raasiku Joker, who have recently been in Esiliiga B, decided to step down from II liiga to III liiga, Kuusalu Kalev and Tallinna TransferWise got promoted from the sixth division. In addition, FCI Levadia also put out a third team called Tallinna Levadia U19. The four teams, which left the league, were Jõhvi Phoenix, Tallinn II (both promoted to II liiga), Lasnamäe Ajax II and Kohtla-Järve Järve III (both dissolved). Before the beginning of the season, Põhja-Tallinn also decided to not take part in the league system and therefore the East group had only eleven entrants in two years in a row.

Group D (West)
The 2022 III liiga West division had the most changes in its line-up. There were six new entrant - Rummu Dünamo (relegated from II liiga), Tallinna Jalgpallihaigla, Tallinna Rumori Calcio (both promoted from IV liiga), Tabasalu Ulasabat, Tallinna Flora IV and Pärnu Tervis (all three did not compete in the previous year) - and six teams, who left the league - Nõmme United U21, Harju Laagri II (got promoted to II liiga), Tabasalu II, Rummu Dünamo II, Tallinna Legion III (all dissolved) and Kernu Kadakas (relegated to IV liiga). One of the newcomers, Pärnu Tervis, had three players, who played in Meistriliiga the previous year.

Group A (North)
Pos	Team	Pld	Pts
1	Tallinna Cosmos (C, P)	22	52
2	Tallinna ReUnited	22	50
3	Tallinna Zapoos	22	46
4	Tallinna Eston Villa	22	37
5	Tallinna Zenit	22	37
6	Saku Sporting	22	36
7	Tallinna Hell Hunt	22	35
8	Tallinna Ararat	22	33
9	Tallinna Olympic Olybet	22	29
10	Nõmme Kalju III	22	16
11	Tallinna Wolves (R)	22	9
12	Tallinna Štrommi (R)	22	1

Source: EJL
(C) Champions; (P) Promoted; (R) Relegated

Group B (South)
Pos	Team	Pld	Pts
1	Tartu Team Helm (C, P)	20	60
2	Tartu Kalev II	20	45
3	Otepää	20	41
4	Imavere	20	32
5	Vastseliina	20	29
6	Valga Warrior	20	24
7	Põlva Lootos	20	24
8	Tartu Welco X	20	23
9	Tartu Tammeka III	20	19
10	Suure-Jaani United	20	19
11	Jõgeva Wolves (R)	20	3

Source: EJL
(C) Champions; (P) Promoted; (R) Relegated

Group C (East)
Pos	Team	Pld	Pts
1	Türi Ganvix (C, P)	20	46
2	Raasiku Joker	20	40
3	Anija	20	38
4	Rakvere Tarvas II	20	37
5	Tallinna TransferWise	20	35
6	Maardu Aliens	20	30
7	Loo	20	27
8	Põhja-Tallinna Volta	20	23
9	Tallinna Levadia U19	20	21
10	Järva-Jaani	20	17
11	Kuusalu Kalev (R)	20	5

Source: EJL
(C) Champions; (P) Promoted; (R) Relegated

Group D (West)
Pos	Team	Pld	Pts
1	Pärnu Tervis (C, P)	22	61
2	Rummu Dünamo	22	44
3	Tallinna Maksatransport	22	44
4	Pärnu Poseidon	22	39
5	Tabasalu Ulasabat	22	38
6	Raplamaa II	22	37
7	Tallinna Rumori Calcio	22	36
8	Tallinna Flora IV	22	23
9	Läänemaa Haapsalu	22	22
10	Pärnu II	22	22
11	Märjamaa Kompanii (R)	22	19
12	Tallinna Jalgpallihaigla (R)	22	0

Source: EJL
(C) Champions; (P) Promoted; (R) Relegated

Champion's match:

22 October Semifinal	Tartu Team Helm	0–4	Pärnu Tervis	Tartu, Estonia
15:30 UTC+03		Report	25' Saarts; 47' Hanson; 79' Sepp; 86' Paabut	Stadium: Tartu Sepa jalgpallikeskuse kunstmuruväljak Attendance: 52; Referee: Karl Kena

Semifinal	Tallinna Cosmos	w/o	Türi Ganvix

29 October Final	Pärnu Tervis	5–2	Tallinna Cosmos	Pärnu, Estonia
15:00 UTC+03	Hallmere 2'; Hanson 11'; Sarapuu 67'; Vihmoja 69'; Oja 86'	Report	59' Grigorevskiy; 78' Bnatov	Stadium: Pärnu kunstmurustaadion Attendance: 67; Referee: Voiteh Karnatsevitš

Relegation play-off:
The relegation play-offs were not held in 2023 because there were not enough teams interested in getting promoted to III liiga.

==== IV liiga ====
The 2022 season of IV liiga will differ from the previous year's: although the division has as many entrants as in the previous season (26), the clubs voted to have two regions with 13 members. In the first round, every team in the same region will play each other once. In the second round, the table is split into two, as teams ranked 1.-7. and 8.-13. will play five or six games more. At the end of the season, clubs placed in the top four get the opportunity to get promoted to III liiga. Fifth and sixth teams can take part in the promotion play-offs against III liiga's 10th-placed clubs. The season starts on 24 April and the first round concludes on 21 August.

North / South

North / West

Group A (North / South)
Pos	Team	Pld	Pts
1	Saue II (C, P)	18	46
2	Saku Sporting II	18	41
3	Tallinna Piraaja II	18	39
4	Tallinna Reaal (P)	18	26
5	Kose II (P)	18	22
6	Kurtna (P)	18	22
7	Maarjamäe Vigri	18	19
8	Illi & Jõgeva Noorus-96 (D)	18	13
9	Tallinna Soccernet	17	27
10	Tallinna Rumori Calcio II	17	18
11	Äksi Wolves	17	18
12	Pärnu Poseidon II (D)	17	12

Source: EJL
(C) Champions; (D) Disqualified; (P) Promoted

Group B (North / West)
Pos	Team	Pld	Pts
1	Harju Laagri III (C, P)	18	43
2	Tallinna Maksatransport II	18	40
3	Kristiine (P)	18	39
4	Tallinna Eston Villa II	18	37
5	FCP Pärnu (P)	18	35
6	Tallinna Teleios (P)	18	22
7	Tallinna Sssolutions	18	15
8	Tallinna EstHam United	17	25
9	Lelle & Vändra Vaprus II	17	20
10	Tallinna Toompea	17	19
11	Kohila Püsivus	17	17
12	Kernu Kadakas	17	13
13	Tallinna Wolves II	17	5

Source: EJL
(C) Champions; (P) Promoted

=== Women ===
==== Naiste Meistriliiga ====
Pos	Team	Pld	W	D	L	GF	GA	GD	Pts	Promotion, qualification or relegation
1	Tallinna Flora (C)	24	24	0	0	154	12	+142	72	Qualification for the Champions League first qualifying round
2	Saku Sporting	24	17	3	4	91	26	+65	54	
3	Tallinna Kalev	24	12	1	11	51	57	−6	37	
4	Tabasalu	24	11	2	11	67	64	+3	35	
5	Tartu Tammeka	24	12	1	11	57	58	−1	37	
6	Pärnu Vaprus	24	9	2	13	55	90	−35	29	
7	Põlva Lootos (R)	24	2	5	17	21	83	−62	11	Qualification for the relegation play-offs
8	Viljandi Tulevik & Suure-Jaani United (R)	24	1	2	21	13	119	−106	5	Relegation to the Esiliiga

Source: EJL
Rules for classification: 1) Points; 2) Less matches awarded against; 3) Head-to-head points; 4) Head-to-head goal difference; 5) Matches won; 6) Goal difference; 7) Goals scored; 8) Away goals scored; 9) Fairplay ranking.
(C) Champions; (R) Relegated
Locations of the 2022 Naiste Meistriliiga teams

Relegation play-off:

Team 1	Agg.	Team 2	1st leg	2nd leg
Viimsi (Esiliiga 2nd)	4–2	Põlva Lootos (Meistriliiga 7th)	2–2	0–2

==== Naiste Esiliiga ====
Pos	Team	Pld	W	D	L	GF	GA	GD	Pts	Promotion, qualification or relegation
1	Lasnamäe Ajax (C, P)	20	13	3	4	58	24	+34	42	Promotion to the Naiste Meistriliiga
2	Viimsi (P)	20	12	2	6	43	29	+14	38	Qualification for the promotion play-offs
3	Tallinna Kalev II	20	11	4	5	47	25	+22	37	
4	Jõhvi Phoenix	20	10	3	7	30	26	+4	33	
5	Kuressaare	20	9	3	8	35	33	+2	30	
6	Tallinna Flora II	19	10	4	5	66	23	+43	34	
7	Tartu Tammeka II	19	8	2	9	33	28	+5	26	
8	Saku Sporting II	19	4	1	14	26	56	−30	13	
9	Rakvere Tarvas	19	0	0	19	4	98	−94	0	

Source: EJL
Rules for classification: 1) Points; 2) Less matches awarded against; 3) Head-to-head points; 4) Head-to-head goal difference; 5) Matches won; 6) Goal difference; 7) Goals scored; 8) Away goals scored; 9) Fairplay ranking.
(C) Champions; (P) Promoted
Locations of the 2022 Naiste Esiliiga teams

=== Futsal ===
==== Coolbet saaliliiga ====
The highest division of futsal in Estonia began on 29 October 2021. Unlike previous seasons, this year the division had ten different clubs due to the COVID-19 pandemic, which stopped 2021 Esiliiga season earlier than expected. Therefore, the top teams could not be decided and three teams competed for another two spots. Sillamäe Kalev and Rõuge Saunamaa managed to get promoted by being ahead of Aruküla Radius. In addition, Tartu Maksimum Welco - who finished 2021 Coolbet saaliliiga in 7th place - merged with Jõgeva Wolves. The team decided to take the Jõgeva-based team's name. While in the previous seasons only six teams have qualified to the final play-offs, then due to the increase of teams, eight teams will get to participate after the main season has ended. Every team will start in the quarterfinals.

Main phase:

Pos	Team	Pld	W	D	L	GF	GA	GD	Pts	Promotion, qualification or relegation
1	Tallinna Cosmos	18	14	0	4	137	38	+99	42	Championship play-off quarterfinal
2	Viimsi Smsraha	18	14	0	4	124	56	+68	42	Championship play-off quarterfinal
3	Narva United	18	12	1	5	99	66	+33	37	Championship play-off quarterfinal
4	Tartu Ravens Futsal	18	11	1	6	86	71	+15	34	Championship play-off quarterfinal
5	Sillamäe Silmet	18	9	1	8	89	102	−13	28	Championship play-off quarterfinal
6	Kohila	18	8	2	8	81	95	−14	26	Championship play-off quarterfinal
7	Sillamäe Alexela	18	6	2	10	95	106	−11	20	Championship play-off quarterfinal
8	Rummu Dünamo	18	5	2	11	73	100	−27	17	Championship play-off quarterfinal
9	Jõgeva Wolves (O)	18	2	3	13	75	147	−72	9	Relegation play-offs
10	Rõuge Saunamaa (R)	18	3	0	15	57	135	−78	9	Relegation

Source: EJL
Rules for classification: 1) Points; 2) Less matches awarded against; 3) Head-to-head points; 4) Head-to-head goal difference; 5) Matches won; 6) Goal difference; 7) Goals scored; 8) Draw.
(O) Play-off winners; (R) Relegated
Locations of the 2021-22 Coolbet Saaliliiga teams

Play-offs:

Quarterfinal
1	Tallinna Cosmos	5	12	–	–	2
8	Rummu Dünamo	1	3	–	–	0
3	Narva United	2	1	–	–	0
6	Kohila	5	2	–	–	2
2	Viimsi Smsraha	7	7	9	–	2
7	Sillamäe Alexela	2	9	2	–	1
4	Tartu Ravens Futsal	6	3 (2)	–	–	2
5	Sillamäe Silmet	3	– (–)	–	–	0

Semifinal
1	Tallinna Cosmos	6	7	–	–	2
6	Kohila	5	0	–	–	0
2	Viimsi Smsraha	6	5	–	–	2
4	Tartu Ravens Futsal	3	2	–	–	0

Final
1	Tallinna Cosmos	4	4	6	3	8
2	Viimsi Smsraha	5	3	2	5	0
Third place
4	Tartu Ravens Futsal	3 (5)	10	–	–	2
6	Kohila	3 (4)	6	–	–	0

Relegation play-off:

Team 1	Agg.	Team 2	1st leg	2nd leg
Rantipol Võru Helios (Esiliiga 3rd)	—	Jõgeva Wolves (Coolbet Saaliliiga 9th)	—	—

==== Saalijalgpalli Esiliiga ====
Futsal's second division was for the first time in five years the lowest division in Estonia: due to lack of clubs interested in II liiga, the third division was cancelled for this season and the remaining teams were promoted to Esiliiga. Therefore, Rantipol Võru Helios, Otepää Ravens (formerly known as Otepää Kanepi vald) and Äksi Wolves were all promoted to Esiliiga. In addition, Tallinna Cosmos II returns after a four-year hiatus and Jõhvi Phoenix makes its debut. These teams replace Rõuge Saunamaa, Sillamäe Alexela (both promoted), Jõgeva Wolves (merged with Tartu Maksimum Welco) and Viimsi Smsraha U19 (did not compete in the league system).

The season was largely dominated by Tallinna Cosmos II who won the league for the second time after 2018. For the second time in Esiliigas history, the winner did not lose any games (same happened in 2014 with Tallinna Ararat TTÜ, although Ararat played two games less). Cosmos II's only point loss came against Narva Ganza, who drew 4–4 with them. The best team, which was eligible for promotion, was Aruküla Radius who lost only four games. Rantipol Võru Helios reached the promotion play-offs on its debut season. The seasons best goalscorer also came from Võru: Rantipols attacker Eduard Desjatski scored 30 goals. Most assists were given by Radius' Rando Randjõe.

Pos	Team	Pld	W	D	L	GF	GA	GD	Pts	Promotion, qualification or relegation
1	Tallinna Cosmos II (Note: Reserve teams are ineligible for promotion.) (C)	16	15	1	0	112	34	+78	46	
2	Aruküla Radius (P)	16	11	1	4	102	60	+42	34	Promotion
3	Rantipol Võru Helios	16	10	1	5	103	76	+27	31	Promotion play-offs
4	Narva United II	16	8	0	8	85	69	+16	24	
5	Jõhvi Phoenix	16	7	2	7	77	73	+4	23	
6	Kadrina Vitamin Well	16	5	1	10	75	88	−13	16	
7	Narva Ganza	16	5	1	10	67	108	−41	16	
8	Otepää Ravens	16	4	2	10	62	105	−43	14	
9	Äksi Wolves	16	2	1	13	77	147	−70	7	

Source: EJL
Rules for classification: 1) Points; 2) Less matches awarded against; 3) Head-to-head points; 4) Head-to-head goal difference; 5) Matches won; 6) Goal difference; 7) Goals scored; 8) Draw.
(C) Champions; (P) Promoted
Notes:
Locations of the 2021-22 Saali Esiliiga teams

== Cup competitions ==
=== Tipneri karikavõistlused ===
Quarterfinals
PL	Narva Trans	2
PL	Tartu Tammeka	0
PL	Nõmme Kalju	7
ELB	Tabasalu	0
PL	Tallinna Flora	2
PL	Tallinna Levadia	0
PL	Tallinna Legion	0
PL	Paide Linnameeskond	2

Semifinals
PL	Narva Trans	0
PL	Nõmme Kalju	1
PL	Tallinna Flora	0 (4)
PL	Paide Linnameeskond	0 (5)

Final
PL	Nõmme Kalju	0
PL	Paide Linnameeskond^{AET}	1

Home teams listed on top of bracket. (AET): At Extra Time, (PL): Premium liiga, (ELB): Esiliiga B

=== Small Cup ===
Quarterfinals
II	Rakvere Tarvas	5
III	Raasiku Joker	0
II	Maardu Linnameeskond	1 (4)
II	Paide Linnameeskond III	1 (3)
III	Tallinna ReUnited	5
III	Tallinna Zapoos	0
II	Tallinna Flora U19	1 (6)
III	Tallinna Cosmos	1 (5)

Semifinals
II	Rakvere Tarvas	3
II	Maardu Linnameeskond	2
III	Tallinna ReUnited	3
II	Tallinna Flora U19	4

Final
II	Rakvere Tarvas	1 (3)
II	Tallinna Flora U19	1 (2)

Home teams listed on top of bracket. (AET): At Extra Time, (II): II liiga, (III): III liiga

=== Women's Cup ===
Quarterfinals
ML	Tabasalu	0
ML	Tallinna Flora	5
EL	Jõhvi Phoenix	0
ML	Saku Sporting	9
ML	Pärnu Vaprus	0
ML	Tallinna Kalev	5
ML	Tartu Tammeka	1
ML	Põlva Lootos^{AET}	2

Semifinals
ML	Tallinna Flora	2
ML	Saku Sporting	0
ML	Tallinna Kalev	1
ML	Põlva Lootos	0

Final
ML	Tallinna Flora	7
ML	Tallinna Kalev	1

Home teams listed on top of bracket. (AET): At Extra Time, (PL): Premium liiga, (ELB): Esiliiga B

=== Futsal Cup ===
The 2021-22 Futsal Cup began on 23 November and had sixteen competitors. There were nine teams from Coolbet Saaliliiga and seven teams from Esiliiga. The three teams, who took part in the league system, but decided against competing in the cup competition, were Sillamäe Alexela (Coolbet Saaliliiga), Tallinna Cosmos II and Kadrina Vitamin Well (both Esiliiga). In the end, Viimsi Smsraha and Tallinna Cosmos reached the final, which meant that for the first time in Futsal Cup history, the competition had the same two finalists in successive seasons.

Quarterfinals
CL	Rummu Dünamo	4
CL	Tartu Ravens Futsal	12
CL	Kohila	1
CL	Viimsi Smsraha	2
EL	Rantipol Võru Helios	3
EL	Narva United II	4
CL	Tallinna Cosmos	11
EL	Jõhvi Phoenix	2

Semifinals
CL	Tartu Ravens Futsal	4
CL	Viimsi Smsraha^{AET}	7
EL	Narva United II	1
CL	Tallinna Cosmos	5

Final
CL	Viimsi Smsraha^{AET}	7
CL	Tallinna Cosmos	5

Home teams listed on top of bracket. (AET): At Extra Time, (CL): Coolbet saaliliiga, (EL): Esiliiga

=== Supercups ===
23 October 2021 Futsal's Supercup	Viimsi Smsraha	5–2	Tartu Ravens Futsal	Tartu
17:00	Kostin 10'; Andreev 16', 33'; Edwin Stüf 31'; Makarov 38'	Report	5', 17' Nuuma	Stadium: EMÜ Spordihoone; Attendance: 77; Referee: Kristjan Kattus, Voiteh Karnatsevitš

25 February 2022 Men's Supercup	Tallinna Levadia	0–0 (4–2 p)	Tallinna Flora	Tallinn
19:00		Report		Stadium: Sportland Arena; Attendance: 479; Referee: Kristo Külljastinen
	Penalties
	Uggè (penalty scored); Putinčanin (penalty scored); Kirss (penalty missed); Roosnupp (penalty scored); Beglarishvili (penalty scored)		(penalty missed) Poom; (penalty scored) Koskor; (penalty scored) Alliku; (penalty missed) Lilander

27 March 2022 Women's Supercup	Tallinna Flora	3–0	Saku Sporting	Tallinn
12:00	Saar 24', 58'; Tammik 44'	Report		Stadium: Sportland Arena; Attendance: 247; Referee: Reelika Turi

TBA Beach Football's Supercup	TBA	v	TBA	TBA

== County competition ==
In 2022 Estonian County Competition returned after a hiatus of two years. The ninth round showed a few surprising results: first-placed Harjumaa lost 2–10 to Tartumaa, who has won its last three goals with a goal difference of 28–4. The year was also successful for Põlvamaa, who beat Pärnumaa 6–2. The South Estonian county had not won a game in 90 minutes (excluding penalty shoot-outs) since 2013. The only draw came on 3 September, when both Valgamaa and Tallinn scored two goals.

=== 2022 Fixtures ===
23 July Round 9	Hiiumaa	0–1	Raplamaa	Kärdla, Hiiumaa
14:30		Report	63' Kaupo Kantsik (Raplamaa)	Stadium: Kärdla linnastaadion Attendance: 47; Referee: Priit Alekask

30 July Round 9	Viljandimaa	1–0	Läänemaa	Viljandi, Viljandimaa
15:00	Rain Tölpus (clubless) 84'	Report		Stadium: Viljandi linnastaadion Attendance: 40; Referee: Mark-Julius Pikat

12 August Round 9	Järvamaa	3–1	Saaremaa	Paide, Järvamaa
17:00	Roman Žarovski (Türi Ganvix) 31' (pen.); Tarmo Neemelo (Tallinna Zenit) 60'; Arto Saar (Järva-Jaani) 90+1'	Report	74' Karmo Paju (Läänemaa)	Stadium: Paide linnastaadion Attendance: 74; Referee: Timo Teniste

14 August Round 9	Jõgevamaa	6–0	Lääne-Virumaa	Põltsamaa, Jõgevamaa
12:00	Mairo Tikerberi (Jõgeva Noorus-96) 7'; Aivar Anniste (Tallinna Kalev U21) 45+1', 55'; Targo Parkala (Jõgeva Noorus-96) 58' (pen.), 86'; Indrek Valejev (clubless) 90'	Report		Stadium: Põltsamaa staadion Attendance: 53; Referee: Karl Kena

21 August Round 9	Põlvamaa	6–2	Pärnumaa	Põlva, Põlvamaa
11:00	Erki Mõttus (clubless) 2', 27'; Temari Nuuma (Põlva Lootos) 23', 32'; Markus Lina (Põlva Lootos) 66'; Erik Listmann (Harju Laagri III) 90'	Report	Madis Moos (Pärnu) 7', 90'	Stadium: Lootospark; Referee: Richard Toom

3 September Round 9	Valgamaa	2–2	Tallinn	Tehvandi, Valgamaa
14:00	Ilja-Andris Uspehov (Valga Warrior) 72'; Raul Lehismets (Otepää) 86'	Report	Rasmus Kuber (Tallinna Zapoos) 26'; Gregor Wahl (Tallinna ReUnited) 30'	Stadium: Tehvandi staadion Referee: Rain Tölpus

24 September Round 9	Tartumaa	10–2	Harjumaa	Ülenurme, Tartumaa
16:00	Martin Jõgi (Tartu Welco) 2', 15', 20', 37'; Mikk Valtna (Tartu Welco) 13', 31', 43', 73'; Rasmus Tomson (Tallinna Zenit) 33'; Martin-Gert Pärli (Tartu Kalev) 58'	Report	Aivo Menken Parts (Harju Laagri III) 48'; Ken-Glaid Nool (Harju Laagri) 83'	Stadium: Ülenurme staadion Attendance: 14; Referee: Paul Kask

4 November Round 9	Ida-Virumaa	0–5	Võrumaa	Kohtla-Järve, Ida-Virumaa
17:00		Report	Eduard Desjatski (Võru Helios) 8'; Mattias Eskla (Võru Helios) 15', 62'; Kert-Sander Eerik (Võru Helios) 33'; Arlet Raha (Võru Helios) 77'	Stadium: Kohtla-Järve kunstmuruväljak Attendance: 12; Referee: Artjom Adamenkov

== European competitions ==
Due to Estonia being 53rd in the UEFA rankings, only three teams from Estonia can compete in the European competitions. The only club, who plays in the UEFA Champions League, is the reigning champion Tallinna Levadia. For the first time in Estonian football history, they will begin their journey in the preliminary round. In addition, second-placed Tallinna Flora and the Estonian Cup winner Paide Linnameeskond will play in the UEFA Europa Conference League.

Tallinna Levadia

21 June 2022 Champions League PR-SF	Levadia	1–6	(Iceland) Víkingur Reykjavík	Reykjavík, Iceland
21:30 (23:30 EEST)	Beglarishvili 5' (pen.)	Report	10' McLagan; 27' Ingason; 45+1' Sigurðsson; 49' Hansen; 71' Gudjónsson; 77' Magnússon	Stadium: Víkingsvöllur; Attendance: 725; Referee: Tomasz Musiał (Poland)

19 July 2022 Conference League Q2	Hibernians (Malta)	3–2	FCI Levadia	Ta' Qali, Malta (Note: Hibernians played their home matches at the Centenary Stadium in Ta' Qali, instead of their regular stadium, the Hibernians Stadium, in Paola, which did not meet UEFA requirements.)
21:00 (EEST)	Apap 17'; Degabriele 24'; Muritala 90'	Report	Uggè 87'; Agyiri 90+4'	Stadium: Centenary Stadium; Attendance: 474; Referee: Volen Chinkov (Bulgaria)

28 July 2022 Conference League Q2	FCI Levadia	1–1	(Malta) Hibernians	Tallinn, Estonia
20:00 (EEST)	Õigus 79'	Report	Apap 78'	Stadium: Lilleküla Stadium; Attendance: 1,351; Referee: Henrik Nalbandyan (Armenia)

Tallinna Flora

7 July 2022 Conference League Q1	Tallinna Flora	1–0	(Finland) SJK	Tallinn, Estonia
18:00 (19:00 EEST)	Miller 21'	Report		Stadium: Lilleküla Stadium; Attendance: 1,910; Referee: Lazar Lukić (Serbia)

14 July 2022 Conference League Q1	SJK (Finland)	4–2 (a.e.t.)	Tallinna Flora	Seinäjoki, Estonia
18:00 (19:00 EEST)	Jervis 59' (pen.), 66', 85'; Tikkanen 113'	Report	9' Lilander; 47' Ojamaa	Stadium: OmaSP Stadion; Attendance: 2,469; Referee: Jørgen Burchardt (Denmark)

Paide Linnameeskond

7 July 2022 Conference League Q1	Dinamo Tbilisi (Georgia (country))	2–3	Paide Linnameeskond	Tbilisi, Georgia
19:00 (20:00 EEST)	Skhirtladze 22'; Kharabadze 65'	Report	61' Luts; 81' Singhateh; 89' Piht	Stadium: Boris Paichadze Dinamo Arena; Attendance: 4,530; Referee: Miloš Bošković (Montenegro)

14 July 2022 Conference League Q1	Paide Linnameeskond	1–2 (a.e.t.) (6–5 p)	(Georgia (country)) Dinamo Tbilisi	Pärnu, Estonia
18:00 (19:00 EEST)	Singhateh 115' (pen.)	Report	69' Skhirtladze; 93' Antilevsky	Stadium: Pärnu Rannastaadion (Note: Paide Linnameeskond will play their first and second qualifying round home match at the Pärnu Rannastaadion in Pärnu, instead of their regular stadium, the Paide linnastaadion, in Paide, which did not meet UEFA requirements.); Attendance: 1,440; Referee: Svein Oddvar Moen (Norway)
	Penalties
	Mošnikov (penalty scored); Palumets (penalty scored); Tambedou (penalty scored); Saarma (penalty scored); Singateh (penalty scored); Piht (penalty scored)		(penalty scored) Antilevsky; (penalty scored) Kutsia; (penalty scored) Barnes; (penalty scored) Camara; (penalty scored) Gabedava; (penalty missed) Kharabadze

21 July 2022 Conference League Q2	Ararat-Armenia	0–0	Paide Linnameeskond	Yerevan, Armenia
18:00 (EEST)		Report		Stadium: Yerevan Football Academy Stadium; Attendance: 1,400; Referee: Sandi Putros (Denmark)

28 July 2022 Conference League Q2	Paide Linnameeskond	0–0 (a.e.t.) (5–3 p)	Ararat-Armenia	Pärnu, Estonia
19:00 (EEST)		Report		Stadium: Pärnu Rannastaadion; Attendance: 1,427; Referee: Damian Sylwestrzak (Poland)
	Penalties
	Mošnikov (penalty scored); Palumets (penalty scored); Singateh (penalty scored); Saarma (penalty scored); Tambedou (penalty scored)		(penalty scored) Alemão; (penalty scored) Lima; (penalty scored) Wbeymar; (penalty missed) Duarte

4 August 2022 Conference League Q3	Paide Linnameeskond	0–2	(Belgium) Anderlecht	Tallinn, Estonia
19:45 (EEST)		Report	10' Refaelov; 40' F. Silva	Stadium: Lilleküla Stadium (Note: Paide Linnameeskond will play their third qualifying round home match at the Lilleküla Stadium in Tallinn, instead of their regular stadium, the Paide linnastaadion, in Paide, which did not meet UEFA requirements.); Attendance: 7,506; Referee: David Fuxman (Israel)

11 August 2022 Conference League Q3	Anderlecht (Belgium)	3–0	Paide Linnameeskond	Brussels, Belgium
22:00 (EEST)	Fábio Silva 62'; Murillo 71', 75'	Report		Stadium: Constant Vanden Stock Stadium; Attendance: 11,235; Referee: Giorgi Kruashvili (Georgia)

== Notable transfers ==
Transfers are in alphabetical order. Players with "*" behind their name have changed teams inside and outside of Meistriliiga. Player's last team is listed as "free agent" if he has not represented a team in the previous six months. Player's next team is listed as "free agent" if he has not found a new club within the following six months.

=== Inside Meistriliiga ===
Listed are players, who have joined or left a club participating in the 2022 Meistriliiga. The player must have represented the Estonian national team at least once. The list may also contain more known players, who have either changed their club inside the lower leagues or retired from football.

Name	Pos.	Age	From	To	Date	Notes
Mihkel Ainsalu	MF	25	Tallinna Legion	Tallinna Levadia	04.03	Contract with Legion ended. Signed a new contract with Levadia.
Hannes Anier	FW	28	Tallinna Levadia	Tallinna Kalev	11.02	Contract with Levadia ended. Signed a new contract with Kalev.
Artjom Artjunin	DF	32	Tallinna Legion	Tallinna Levadia U21	02.03	Started as a player-coach in FCI Levadia U21.
Aleksandr Dmitrijev	MF	39	Tallinna Legion	retired	01.01	Contract with Legion ended.
Trevor Elhi	DF	28	Tallinna Levadia	Nõmme Kalju	01.01	Contract with Levadia ended. Signed a new contract with Kalju.
Marek Kaljumäe	DF	30	Pärnu Vaprus	Tallinna Kalev	13.01	Contract with Vaprus ended. Signed a new contract with Kalev.
Tristan Koskor	FW	26	Tartu Tammeka	Tallinna Flora	01.01	Contract with Tammeka ended. Signed a new contract for 2 years.
Vladislav Kreida*	MF	22	(Sweden) Helsingborg	Tallinna Flora	01.01	Loan deal with Helsingborgs ended.
Vladislav Kreida*	MF	22	(Ukraine) Veres Rivne	Tallinna Flora	06.03	Loan deal with Veres terminated.
Vladislav Kreida*	MF	22	(Sweden) Skövde	Tallinna Flora	06.03	Loan deal with Skövde ended.
Dmitri Kruglov	DF	37	Maardu Linnameeskond	retired	01.01	Contract with Maardu ended. Started coaching FCI U17 team.
Henri Järvelaid	DF	23	(Norway) Sogndal	Nõmme Kalju	05.01	Contract with Sogndal ended. Signed a new contract for 2 years.
Karl Mööl	MF	29	Kuressaare	Paide Linnameeskond	01.01	Loan deal with Kuressaare ended.
Artur Pikk	DF	28	(Latvia) Rīgas Futbola skola	Tallinna Levadia	03.01	Contract with RFS ended. Signed a new contract with Levadia.
Sander Puri	MF	33	Tallinna Legion	Tartu Tammeka	10.02	Contract with Legion ended. Signed a new contract with Tammeka.
Kaimar Saag	FW	33	Viljandi Tulevik	Paide Linnameeskond	02.01	Contract with Tulevik ended. Signed a new contract with Paide.
Joonas Tamm	DF	30	(Ukraine) Vorskla Poltava	Tallinna Flora	09.03	Signed a loan deal with Flora for 4 months.
Deniss Tjapkin	MF	30	Nõmme Kalju	Tallinn	10.03	Contract with Kalju ended. Signed a new contract with Tallinn.
Bogdan Vaštšuk*	MF	26	(Ukraine) Vorskla Poltava	Tallinna Levadia	08.03	Loan deal with Vorskla terminated.

=== Outside Meistriliiga ===
Listed are all Estonian footballers, who have joined or left a foreign team.

Name	Pos.	Age	From	To	Date	Notes
Mihkel Ainsalu	MF	26	Tallinna Levadia	(Netherlands) Telstar	01.07	Contract with Levadia terminated. Signed a new contract with Telstar.
Deivid Andreas	MF	20	(Spain) Lleida Esportiu B	(Romania) Sighetu Marmației	24.08	Signed a new contract with Sighetu Marmației.
Henri Anier	FW	31	Paide Linnameeskond	(Thailand) Muangthong United	04.01	Contract with Paide ended. Signed a new contract with Muangthong.
Artjom Dmitrijev	MF	33	(Kazakhstan) Zhetysu	(Uzbekistan) Qizilqum Zarafshon	26.02	Signed a contract with Qizilqum for 1 year.
Karl Hein	GK	19	(England) Arsenal	(England) Reading	24.01	Signed a loan deal with Reading for 6 months.
Karl Hein	GK	20	(England) Reading	(England) Arsenal	31.06	Loan deal with Reading ended.
Matvei Igonen	GK	25	Tallinna Flora	(Poland) Podbeskidzie Bielsko-Biała	01.01	Contract with Flora ended. Signed a new contract for 1.5 + 2 years.
Oliver Jürgens	FW	19	(Italy) Inter Milan Youth Sector	(Italy) Torino Youth Sector	20.08	Signed a new contract with Torino for 3 years.
Imre Kartau	MF	16	Harju Laagri	(Italy) Venezia U18	09.09	Signed a new contract with Venezia for 3 years.
Kaur Kivila	GK	18	(Italy) Hellas Verona Primavera	(Italy) Carpi	04.08	Signed a loan deal with Carpi for 1 year.
Tristan Koskor	FW	26	Tallinna Flora	(Cyprus) Peyia 2014	02.08	Signed a new contract with Peyia 2014 for 1+1 years.
Vladislav Kreida*	MF	22	Tallinna Flora	(Ukraine) Veres Rivne	17.01	Signed a loan deal with Rivne for 6 months.
Vladislav Kreida*	MF	22	Tallinna Flora	(Sweden) Skövde	31.03	Signed a loan deal with Skövde for 3 months.
Aleksandr Kulinitš	DF	29	Nõmme Kalju	(Germany) Rostocker	28.01	Contract with Kalju ended. Signed a new contract for 1.5 years.
Märten Kuusk	DF	25	Tallinna Flora	(Hungary) Újpest	25.01	Signed a new contract with Újpest for 3.5 years.
Johann Kõre	MF	18	Viimsi	(Italy) Cosenza Primavera	04.09	Joined Cosenza Youth Academy.
Kristofer Käit	MF	16	Tallinna Kalev	(Portugal) Porto Juniors	10.02	Signed a loan deal for 6 months. The deal can be made permanent.
Kristofer Käit	MF	17	Tallinna Kalev	(Portugal) Rio Ave U18	31.08	Signed a loan deal for 6 months.
Mattias Käit	MF	23	(Norway) Bodø/Glimt	(Romania) Rapid București	18.01	Contract with Bodø/Glimt ended. Signed a new contract for 2.5 years.
Kristoffer Grauberg Lepik	FW	20	(Sweden) Akropolis	(Sweden) Brommapojkarna	01.01	Loan deal with Akropolis ended.
Kristoffer Grauberg Lepik	FW	20	(Sweden) Brommapojkarna	(Italy) Polisportiva Torrese 1974	01.01	Contract with Brommapojkarna ended. Signed a new contract for 6 months.
Kristoffer Grauberg Lepik	FW	21	(Italy) Polisportiva Torrese 1974	(Italy) San Nicolò Notaresco	27.08	Signed a new contract with Notaresco for 1 year.
Frank Liivak	FW	26	Tallinna Levadia	(Republic of Ireland) Sligo Rovers	22.06	Signed a new contract with Sligo Rovers for 1.5 years.
Karol Mets	DF	28	(Bulgaria) CSKA Sofia	(Switzerland) Zürich	07.01	Signed a new contract with Zürich for 2.5 years.
Mihhail Orlov	FW	18	Ida-Virumaa Alliance	(Czech Republic) Silon Táborsko U19	01.08	Signed a new contract with Silon Táborsko for 2 years.
Kevor Palumets	MF	19	Paide Linnameeskond	(Belgium) Zulte Waregem	06.09	Signed a new contract with Zulte Waregem for 3 + 1 years.
Daniil Pareiko	GK	17	Tallinna Levadia	(Italy) SPAL Primavera	30.07	Joined S.P.A.L.-s youth academy.
Rauno Sappinen	FW	25	Tallinna Flora	(Poland) Piast Gliwice	01.01	Signed a new contract for 3.5 + 1 years.
Vlasiy Sinyavskiy	FW	25	(Czech Republic) Karviná	(Czech Republic) Slovácko	23.05	Contract with Karviná ended. Signed a new contract for 3 years.
Erik Sorga	FW	22	(Netherlands) VVV-Venlo	(United States) D.C. United	08.01	Loan deal terminated.
Erik Sorga	FW	22	(United States) D.C. United	(Sweden) Göteborg	08.01	Signed a new contract with Göteborg for 4 years.
Rocco Robert Shein	MF	18	Tallinna Flora	(Netherlands) Jong Utrecht	31.01	Signed a loan deal for 6 months. The deal can be made permanent.
Rocco Robert Shein	MF	18	Tallinna Flora	(Netherlands) Utrecht	27.05	Signed a new contract for 3 years.
Joonas Tamm	DF	30	Tallinna Flora	(Romania) FCSB	11.07	Contract with Flora ended. Signed a new contract with FCSB.
Bogdan Vaštšuk*	MF	26	Tallinna Levadia	(Ukraine) Vorskla Poltava	08.02	Signed a loan deal for 6 months. The deal can be made permanent.
Bogdan Vaštšuk*	MF	26	Tallinna Levadia	(Poland) Stal Mielec	20.07	Signed a new contract for 2 years.
Laurits Õunpuu	DF	16	Tartu Tammeka	(Italy) Modena U19	04.09	Signed a new contract with Modena.

=== Foreign players ===
Listed are all foreign players that have joined or left a team participating in the 2022 Meistriliiga.

Name	Pos.	Age	From	To	Date	Notes
(Australia) Amar Abdallah	DF	22	Tallinna Levadia	Pärnu Vaprus	03.02	Signed a loan deal with Vaprus for 5 months.
(Australia) Amar Abdallah	DF	23	Pärnu Vaprus	Tallinna Levadia	30.06	Loan deal ended.
(Ghana) David Addy	DF	32	free agent	Tartu Tammeka	09.03	Signed a contract with Tammeka.
(Nigeria) Abdullahi Alfa	MF	25	Tallinna Kalev	free agent	01.01	Contract with Kalev ended.
(Montenegro) Dušan Bakić	MF	22	Tallinna Legion	(Belarus) Dinamo Minsk	01.01	Loan deal with Legion ended.
(Russia) Mikhail Belov	MF	29	Narva Trans	(Russia) Atom Novovoronezh	01.01	Contract with Trans ended. Signed a new contract with Atom.
(Tajikistan) Tabrezi Davlatmir	DF	23	Narva Trans	(Tajikistan) Istiklol	01.01	Contract with Trans ended. Signed a new contract with Istiklol.
(Ukraine) Denys Dedechko	DF	34	(Armenia) Noah	Narva Trans	04.02	Signed a contract with Trans.
(Mali) Hadji Dramé	FW	21	Paide Linnameeskond	(Georgia (country)) Dila Gori	27.01	Signed a contract with Dila.
(Trinidad and Tobago) Andre Fortune II	MF	25	(United States) Memphis 901	Nõmme Kalju	07.02	Signed a contract with Kalju for 3 years.
(Russia) Vitali Kalenkovich	MF	28	Narva Trans	(Russia) Salyut Belgorod	17.02	Contract with Trans ended. Signed a contract with Salyut.
(Ukraine) Oleksiy Khoblenko	FW	27	(Ukraine) Kryvbas Kryvyi Rih	Tallinna Levadia	10.03	Signed a contract with FCI Levadia.
(Ukraine) Oleksiy Khoblenko	FW	28	Tallinna Levadia	(Ukraine) Kryvbas Kryvyi Rih	30.06	Loan deal with Levadia ended.
(Ukraine) Vladyslav Khomutov	MF	23	Nõmme Kalju	(Slovakia) FC ŠTK 1914 Šamorín	12.01	Contract with Kalju ended. Signed a new contract with Šamorín.
(Ghana) Ishaku Konda	DF	22	Paide Linnameeskond	(Ghana) Asokwa Deportivo	01.01	Loan deal with Paide ended.
(Ukraine) Oleksandr Kozhevnikov	FW	21	(Ukraine) Vorskla Poltava	Narva Trans	08.04	Signed a contract with Trans.
(Brazil) Liliu	FW	31	(Peru) Sport Huancayo	Tallinna Levadia	24.01	Signed a contract with FCI Levadia.
(Canada) Ryan Lindsay	DF	20	(Canada) York United	Narva Trans	11.02	Signed a contract with Trans for 2 years.
(Canada) Ryan Lindsay	DF	20	Narva Trans	free agent	08.06	Contract terminated.
(Serbia) Luka Luković	DF	20	Tallinna Levadia	Pärnu Vaprus	28.02	Signed a loan deal with Vaprus for 1 year.
(Serbia) Luka Luković	DF	20	Pärnu Vaprus	Tallinna Levadia	30.06	Loan deal ended.
(Serbia) Luka Luković	DF	20	Tallinna Levadia	free agent	04.07	Contract terminated.
(Serbia) Milijan Ilić	DF	28	Tallinna Levadia	(Serbia) Mladost Novi Sad	17.01	Contract with Levadia terminated. Signed a new contract with Mladost.
(The Gambia) Ebrima Jarju	GK	23	(The Gambia) Real de Banjul	Paide Linnameeskond	11.01	Signed a contract with Paide for 3 years.
(France) Yohan Mannone	DF	26	(France) Paris Saint-Germain B	Nõmme Kalju	09.02	Signed a contract with Kalju for 3 years.
(Ukraine) Andriy Markovych	DF	26	Nõmme Kalju	(Ukraine) Karpaty Lviv	26.01	Contract with Kalju ended. Signed a new contract with Karpaty.
(Ukraine) Andriy Markovych	DF	26	(Ukraine) Karpaty Lviv	Nõmme Kalju	06.04	Signed a contract with Kalju.
(Russia) Amir Natkho	MF	25	Tallinna Levadia	(Russia) Armavir	23.02	Contract with Levadia terminated. Signed a new contract with Armavir.
(Lithuania) Sigitas Olberkis	DF	24	Tallinna Legion	(Sweden) Dalkurd	16.03	Contract with Legion ended. Signed a new contract with Dalkurd.
(Nigeria) Lucky Opara	DF	22	(Latvia) Spartaks Jūrmala	Narva Trans	10.03	Signed a loan deal with Trans.
(Ukraine) Volodymyr Pryyomov	FW	36	(Ukraine) Tavriya Simferopol	Narva Trans	07.04	Signed a contract with Trans for six months.
(Ukraine) Artem Schedryi	MF	29	(Ukraine) Kryvbas Kryvyi Rih	Tallinna Levadia	10.03	Signed a contract with FCI Levadia.
(Ukraine) Artem Schedryi	MF	29	Tallinna Levadia	(Ukraine) Kryvbas Kryvyi Rih	30.06	Loan deal with Levadia ended.
(Russia) Daniil Shevyakov	DF	22	(Belarus) Vitebsk-2	Nõmme Kalju	23.02	Signed a contract with Kalju.
(Latvia) Daniils Skopenko	FW	21	Tartu Tammeka	free agent	01.01	Contract with Tammeka ended.
(France) Dominique Simon	MF	21	(Spain) Navarro	Paide Linnameeskond	23.02	Signed a contract with Paide for 2 years.
(The Gambia) Ebrima Singhateh	FW	18	(The Gambia) Real de Banjul	Paide Linnameeskond	11.01	Signed a contract with Paide for 3 years.
(Ukraine) Valeriy Stepanenko	DF	23	(Kazakhstan) Maktaaral	Tallinna Kalev	25.02	Signed a contract with Kalev.
(Russia) Nikita Zagrebelnyi	MF	25	Narva Trans	free agent	01.01	Contract with Trans ended.
(Lithuania) Edgaras Žarskis	DF	27	Narva Trans	(Lithuania) Džiugas Telšiai	26.02	Contract with Trans ended. Signed a new contract with Džiugas.
(The Gambia) Bubacarr Tambedou	FW	19	(The Gambia) Real de Banjul	Paide Linnameeskond	11.01	Signed a contract with Paide for 3 years.
(Ukraine) Denys Taraduda	DF	21	(Ukraine) VPK-Ahro Shevchenkivka	Narva Trans	29.06	Signed a contract with Trans for six months.
(Russia) Daniil Timofeev	FW	19	(Serbia) Belgrade IMT U19	Tallinna Levadia	17.01	Signed a contract with FCI Levadia.
(The Gambia) Foday Trawally	MF	20	Paide Linnameeskond	Tallinna Kalev	25.02	Signed a loan deal with Kalev for 1 year.
(Brazil) Welves	FW	21	(Ukraine) Lviv	Nõmme Kalju	06.04	Signed a loan deal for 3 months with Kalju.
(Ukraine) Andriy Yakymiv	MF	24	free agent	Nõmme Kalju	08.04	Signed a contract with Kalju.

=== Managerial changes ===
Listed are all clubs, who play in the top divisions (Meistriliiga, Esiliiga, Esiliiga B), and national teams who changed managers after the end of the 2021 season.

Team	Division	Outgoing manager	Manner of departure	Date of vacancy	Incoming manager	Date of appointment
Paide Linnameeskond	Meistriliiga	Vjatšeslav Zahovaiko	End of contract	27 November 2021	Karel Voolaid	6 December 2021
Narva Trans	Meistriliiga	(Russia) Igor Pyvin	End of contract	29 November 2021	(Russia) Aleksei Yeryomenko	30 November 2021
Pärnu Vaprus	Meistriliiga	Taavi Midenbritt	End of contract	29 November 2021	(Latvia) Dmitrijs Kalašņikovs	27 December 2021
Tartu Tammeka	Meistriliiga	(Latvia) Dmitrijs Kalašņikovs	End of contract	7 December 2021	(Portugal) Carlos Santos	4 January 2022
Nõmme Kalju	Meistriliiga	(Russia) Sergey Frantsev	Sacked	8 December 2021	(Portugal) Eddie Cardoso	4 January 2022
Viljandi Tulevik	Esiliiga	Sander Post	Mutual consent	18 December 2021	Indrek Ilves	8 January 2022
Tallinna Flora U21	Esiliiga	Ats Sillaste	Mutual consent	21 December 2021	Taavi Viik	21 December 2021
Tartu Welco	Esiliiga B	Meelis Eelmäe	Mutual consent	28 December 2021	Jaanus Reitel	28 December 2021
Tartu Tammeka U21	Esiliiga B	Marti Pähn	Mutual consent	4 January 2022	Siim Valtna	4 January 2022'
Nõmme Kalju U21	Esiliiga B	Marko Kristal	Mutual consent	4 January 2022	Alger Džumadil	4 January 2022
Tallinna Levadia U21	Esiliiga	Robert Sadovski	Mutual consent	11 January 2022	(Serbia) Ivan Stojković	11 January 2022
Tallinna Levadia	Meistriliiga	(Serbia) Marko Savić; Vladimir Vassiljev	Resigned	1 July 2022	(Serbia) Ivan Stojković	1 July 2022
Tallinna Levadia U21	Esiliiga	(Serbia) Ivan Stojković	Mutual consent	1 July 2022	(Russia) Nikita Andreev	1 July 2022
Tartu Tammeka	Meistriliiga	(Portugal) Miguel Santos	Resigned	9 July 2022	Marti Pähn	9 July 2022
Tallinna Levadia	Meistriliiga	(Serbia) Ivan Stojković	Sacked	12 September 2022	(Ukraine) Maksym Kalinichenko	12 September 2022
Tallinna Levadia	Meistriliiga	(Ukraine) Maksym Kalinichenko	Sacked	22 September 2022	(Russia) Nikita Andreev (caretaker)	12 September 2022
Tallinna Levadia U21	Esiliiga	(Russia) Nikita Andreev	Mutual consent	22 September 2022	Artjom Artjunin	22 September 2022
Nõmme Kalju	Meistriliiga	(Portugal) Eddie Cardoso	Sacked	16 October 2022	Kaido Koppel	16 October 2022
Narva Trans	Meistriliiga	(Russia) Aleksei Yeryomenko	Mutual consent	12 November 2022	(Russia) Aleksei Yagudin (caretaker)	12 November 2022
