= 2023 FIFA Women's World Cup qualification – UEFA Group I =

Football tournament qualification stage

UEFA Group I of the 2023 FIFA Women's World Cup qualification competition consists of six teams: France, Wales, Slovenia, Greece, Kazakhstan, and Estonia. The composition of the nine groups in the qualifying group stage was decided by the draw held on 30 April 2021, with the teams seeded according to their coefficient ranking.

The group is played in home-and-away round-robin format between 17 September 2021 and 6 September 2022, with a pause for the Women's Euro 2022 in July. The group winners qualify for the final tournament, while the runners-up advance to the play-offs first round if they are one of the other six runners-up among all nine groups (not counting results against the sixth-placed team).

== Standings ==
Pos	Team	Pld	W	D	L	GF	GA	GD	Pts	Qualification	(France)	(Wales)	(Slovenia)	(Greece)	(Estonia)	(Kazakhstan)
1	France	10	10	0	0	54	4	+50	30	2023 FIFA Women's World Cup	—	2–0	1–0	5–1	11–0	6–0
2	Wales	10	6	2	2	22	5	+17	20	Play-offs	1–2	—	0–0	5–0	4–0	6–0
3	Slovenia	10	5	3	2	21	6	+15	18		2–3	1–1	—	0–0	6–0	2–0
4	Greece	10	4	1	5	12	28	−16	13		0–10	0–1	1–4	—	3–0	3–2
5	Estonia	10	2	0	8	7	43	−36	6		0–9	0–1	0–4	1–3	—	4–2
6	Kazakhstan	10	0	0	10	4	34	−30	0		0–5	0–3	0–2	0–1	0–2	—

Source: UEFA
Rules for classification: Tiebreakers

== Matches ==
Times are CET/CEST, (Note: CEST (UTC+2) for dates between 28 March and 31 October 2021 and between 27 March and 30 October 2022, and CET (UTC+1) for all other dates.) as listed by UEFA (local times, if different, are in parentheses).

17 September 2021
17:00 (18:00 EEST)

Greece	0–10	France
	Report (FIFA); Report (UEFA)	Majri 14'; Geyoro 15', 40'; Katoto 18', 25', 53'; Palama 30' (o.g.); Diani 38'; Asseyi 65'; Renard 90+2' (pen.)

Pampeloponnisiako Stadium, Patras
Referee: Anastasia Pustovoitova (Russia)
17 September 2021
18:00 (19:00 EEST)

Estonia	0–4	Slovenia
	Report (FIFA); Report (UEFA)	Prašnikar 21', 48'; Golob 31'; Agrež 54'

Pärnu Rannastaadion, Pärnu
Referee: Hristiyana Guteva (Bulgaria)
17 September 2021
20:15 (19:15 BST)

Wales	6–0	Kazakhstan
K. Green 17', 71'; Harding 30'; Rowe 54'; Evans 90+1'; Holland 90+3'	Report (FIFA); Report (UEFA)

Parc y Scarlets, Llanelli
Attendance: 1,745
Referee: Monika Mularczyk (Poland)

21 September 2021
19:00 (20:00 EEST)

Estonia	0–1	Wales
	Report (FIFA); Report (UEFA)	Harding 5'

Pärnu Rannastaadion, Pärnu
Referee: Kateryna Monzul (Ukraine)
21 September 2021
19:00 (20:00 EEST)

Greece	3–2	Kazakhstan
Spyridonidou 7', 72'; Aitymova 45+2' (o.g.)	Report (FIFA); Report (UEFA)	Bortnikova 19'; Kirgizbaeva 81'

Pampeloponnisiako Stadium, Patras
Referee: Eszter Urbán (Hungary)
21 September 2021
21:00

Slovenia	2–3	France
Prašnikar 20'; Zver 88' (pen.)	Report (FIFA); Report (UEFA)	Katoto 28', 60'; Majri 90+4' (pen.)

Fazanerija City Stadium, Murska Sobota
Attendance: 543
Referee: Riem Hussein (Germany)

22 October 2021
13:00 (17:00 ALMT)

Kazakhstan	0–1	Greece
	Report (FIFA); Report (UEFA)	Pouliou 85'

Astana Arena, Nur-Sultan
Referee: Marina Krupskaya (Russia)
22 October 2021
20:15

Slovenia	1–1	Wales
Rogan 69'	Report (FIFA); Report (UEFA)	K. Green 71'

Lendava Sports Park, Lendava
Referee: Lovisa Johansson (Sweden)
22 October 2021
21:10

France	11–0	Estonia
Geyoro 5'; Katoto 15'; Périsset 25' (pen.); Cascarino 29'; Toletti 45'; Orav 52' (o.g.); Diani 53'; Tounkara 65', 72'; Saar 79' (o.g.); Dali 90'	Report (FIFA); Report (UEFA)

Stade Dominique Duvauchelle, Créteil
Referee: Abigail Marriott (England)

26 October 2021
16:00 (21:00 ALMT)

Kazakhstan	0–5	France
	Report (FIFA); Report (UEFA)	Katoto 9', 23'; Dali 17'; Malard 38', 54'

Astana Arena, Nur-Sultan
Referee: Melis Özçiğdem (Turkey)
26 October 2021
20:00 (21:00 EEST)

Greece	1–4	Slovenia
Chatzinikolaou 10' (pen.)	Report (FIFA); Report (UEFA)	Zver 8', 59'; Prašnikar 18', 86'

AEL FC Arena, Larissa
Referee: Ivana Projkovska (North Macedonia)
26 October 2021
20:15 (19:15 BST)

Wales	4–0	Estonia
James 27'; Ward 48'; Harding 54'; Ingle 90+3'	Report (FIFA); Report (UEFA)

Cardiff City Stadium, Cardiff
Referee: Marta Frias Acedo (Spain)

26 November 2021
18:00

Slovenia	6–0	Estonia
Prašnikar 9', 38'; Korošec 33'; Kolbl 73'; Raadik 79' (o.g.); Kuštrin 89'	Report (FIFA); Report (UEFA)

Nova Gorica Sports Park, Nova Gorica
Referee: Minka Vekkeli (Finland)
26 November 2021
20:15 (19:15 GMT)

Wales	5–0	Greece
Ingle 7'; K. Green 17'; Holland 26', 56'; Harding 64'	Report (FIFA); Report (UEFA)

Parc y Scarlets, Llanelli
Referee: Henrikke Nervik (Norway)
26 November 2021
21:10

France	6–0	Kazakhstan
Asseyi 5'; Cascarino 9'; Katoto 24'; Périsset 37'; Gauvin 72' (pen.); Dali 74'	Report (FIFA); Report (UEFA)

Stade de la Rabine, Vannes
Referee: Silvia Domingos (Portugal)

30 November 2021
18:00

Slovenia	0–0	Greece
	Report (FIFA); Report (UEFA)

Nova Gorica Sports Park, Nova Gorica
Referee: Maria Sole Caputi (Italy)
30 November 2021
21:10

France	2–0	Wales
Diani 45+2'; Bacha 90'	Report (FIFA); Report (UEFA)

Stade de Roudourou, Guingamp
Referee: Iuliana Demetrescu (Romania)

8 April 2022
14:00 (18:00 ALMT)

Kazakhstan	0–2	Slovenia
	Report (FIFA); Report (UEFA)	Prašnikar 6'; Erman 26'

Astana Arena, Nur-Sultan
Referee: Katarzyna Lisiecka-sek (Poland)
8 April 2022
18:00 (19:00 EEST)

Estonia	1–3	Greece
Himanen 63'	Report (FIFA); Report (UEFA)	Kongouli 14', 21'; Sarri 76'

Lilleküla Stadium, Tallinn
Referee: Lucie Šulcová (Czech Republic)
8 April 2022
20:45 (19:45 BST)

Wales	1–2	France
Ingle 71'	Report (FIFA); Report (UEFA)	Renard 31'; Katoto 57'

Parc y Scarlets, Llanelli
Referee: Jana Adámková (Czech Republic)

12 April 2022
15:00 (19:00 ALMT)

Kazakhstan	0–3	Wales
	Report (FIFA); Report (UEFA)	K. Green 30'; Harding 42'; Fishlock 65'

Astana Arena, Nur-Sultan
Referee: Sara Persson (Sweden)
12 April 2022
19:00 (20:00 EEST)

Greece	3–0	Estonia
Sarri 19'; Kongouli 48'; Pouliou 74'	Report (FIFA); Report (UEFA)

Pampeloponnisiako Stadium, Patras
Referee: Simona Ghisletta (Switzerland)
12 April 2022
21:10

France	1–0	Slovenia
Cascarino 47'	Report (FIFA); Report (UEFA)

MMArena, Le Mans
Referee: Sandra Braz Bastos (Portugal)

28 June 2022
18:00 (19:00 EEST)

Estonia	4–2	Kazakhstan
Saar 61', 88'; Himanen 71'; Tammik 90+5'	Report (FIFA); Report (UEFA)	Turlybekova 37'; Bortnikova 52'

Pärnu Rannastaadion, Pärnu
Referee: Silvia Gasperotti (Italy)

2 September 2022
17:00 (18:00 EEST)

Estonia	0–9	France
	Report (FIFA); Report (UEFA)	Cascarino 6'; Dali 17' (pen.); Sarr 24', 29', 45', 47'; Matéo 59' (pen.), 67'; Geyoro 83'

Lilleküla Stadium, Tallinn
Referee: Silvia Domingos (Portugal)
2 September 2022
18:00

Slovenia	2–0	Kazakhstan
Makovec 33'; Zver 67'	Report (FIFA); Report (UEFA)

Kranj Sports Centre, Kranj
Referee: Cristina Trandafir (Romania)
2 September 2022
19:00 (20:00 EEST)

Greece	0–1	Wales
	Report (FIFA); Report (UEFA)	Jones 34'

Panthessaliko Stadium, Volos
Referee: Monika Mularczyk (Poland)

6 September 2022
15:00 (19:00 ALMT)

Kazakhstan	0–2	Estonia
	Report (FIFA); Report (UEFA)	Demidova 8' (o.g.); Saar 17'

Shakhter Stadium, Karaganda
Referee: Liudmyla Telbukh (Ukraine)
6 September 2022
20:45

France	5–1	Greece
Geyoro 9'; Diani 18', 45+9'; Malard 45'; Baltimore 59'	Report (FIFA); Report (UEFA)	Koggouli 20'

Stade Louis Dugauguez, Sedan
Referee: Riem Hussein (Germany)
6 September 2022
20:45 (19:45 BST)

Wales	0–0	Slovenia
	Report (FIFA); Report (UEFA)

Cardiff City Stadium, Cardiff
Referee: Kateryna Monzul (Ukraine)

== Goalscorers ==
There were 120 goals scored in 30 matches, for an average of 4 goals per match.

10 goals

- (France) Marie-Antoinette Katoto

8 goals

- (Slovenia) Lara Prašnikar

5 goals

- (France) Kadidiatou Diani
- (France) Grace Geyoro
- (Wales) Kayleigh Green
- (Wales) Natasha Harding

4 goals

- (France) Delphine Cascarino
- (France) Kenza Dali
- (France) Ouleymata Sarr
- (Greece) Sophia Koggouli
- (Slovenia) Mateja Zver

3 goals

- (Estonia) Getter Saar
- (France) Melvine Malard
- (Wales) Ceri Holland
- (Wales) Sophie Ingle

2 goals

- (Estonia) Kairi Himanen
- (France) Viviane Asseyi
- (France) Amel Majri
- (France) Clara Matéo
- (France) Ève Périsset
- (France) Wendie Renard
- (France) Aïssatou Tounkara
- (Greece) Grigoria Pouliou
- (Greece) Veatriki Sarri
- (Greece) Anastasia Spyridonidou
- (Kazakhstan) Svetlana Bortnikova

1 goal

- (Estonia) Lisette Tammik
- (France) Selma Bacha
- (France) Sandy Baltimore
- (France) Valérie Gauvin
- (France) Sandie Toletti
- (Greece) Despoina Chatzinikolaou
- (Kazakhstan) Begaim Kirgizbaeva
- (Kazakhstan) Asselkhan Turlybekova
- (Slovenia) Sara Agrež
- (Slovenia) Kristina Erman
- (Slovenia) Lana Golob
- (Slovenia) Špela Kolbl
- (Slovenia) Kaja Korošec
- (Slovenia) Zala Kuštrin
- (Slovenia) Sara Makovec
- (Slovenia) Manja Rogan
- (Wales) Gemma Evans
- (Wales) Jessica Fishlock
- (Wales) Angharad James
- (Wales) Carrie Jones
- (Wales) Rachel Rowe
- (Wales) Helen Ward

1 own goal

- (Estonia) Maria Orav (against France)
- (Estonia) Pille Raadik (against Slovenia)
- (Estonia) Heleri Saar (against France)
- (Greece) Maria Palama (against France)
- (Kazakhstan) Aigerim Aitymova (against Greece)
- (Kazakhstan) Mariya Demidova (against Estonia)
