= Getter Saar =

Getter Saar may refer to:

- Getter Saar (badminton)
- Getter Saar (footballer)
