= Yangi Oʻzbekiston =

Major park in Tashkent, Uzbekistan

- Interactive map of Yangi Oʻzbekiston
- Type: Public park
- Location: Tashkent, Uzbekistan
- Coordinates: 41°19′44″N 69°26′21″E
- Area: 257 acres (104 ha)
- Created: 2021
- Status: Open year round

Yangi Oʻzbekiston (Uzbek: Yangi Oʻzbekiston bogʻi / Янги Ўзбекистон боғи) is a major park in Tashkent, Uzbekistan. One of the largest parks in the country, it was established on occasion of the 30th anniversary of Uzbekistan's independence. The park was originally built on a 104 hectare territory in Qibray District of Tashkent Region, which is adjacent to Tashkent City. Once the park was completed, it became part of the Mirzo Ulugbek District of Tashkent, thereby increasing the area of the city.

Yangi Oʻzbekiston was opened on August 31, 2021. President Shavkat Mirziyoyev attended and delivered the keynote speech at the opening ceremony. Following the completion of the park in Tashkent, several more parks also called Yangi Oʻzbekiston have been created in other cities across Uzbekistan.
