= FC Helios =

FC Helios may refer to:

- FC Helios Kharkiv, Ukrainian football club founded in 2002
- Tartu FC Helios, Estonian football club founded in 2010
- Võru FC Helios, Estonian football club founded in 2010
