= Veatriki Sarri =

Greek footballer (born 1998)

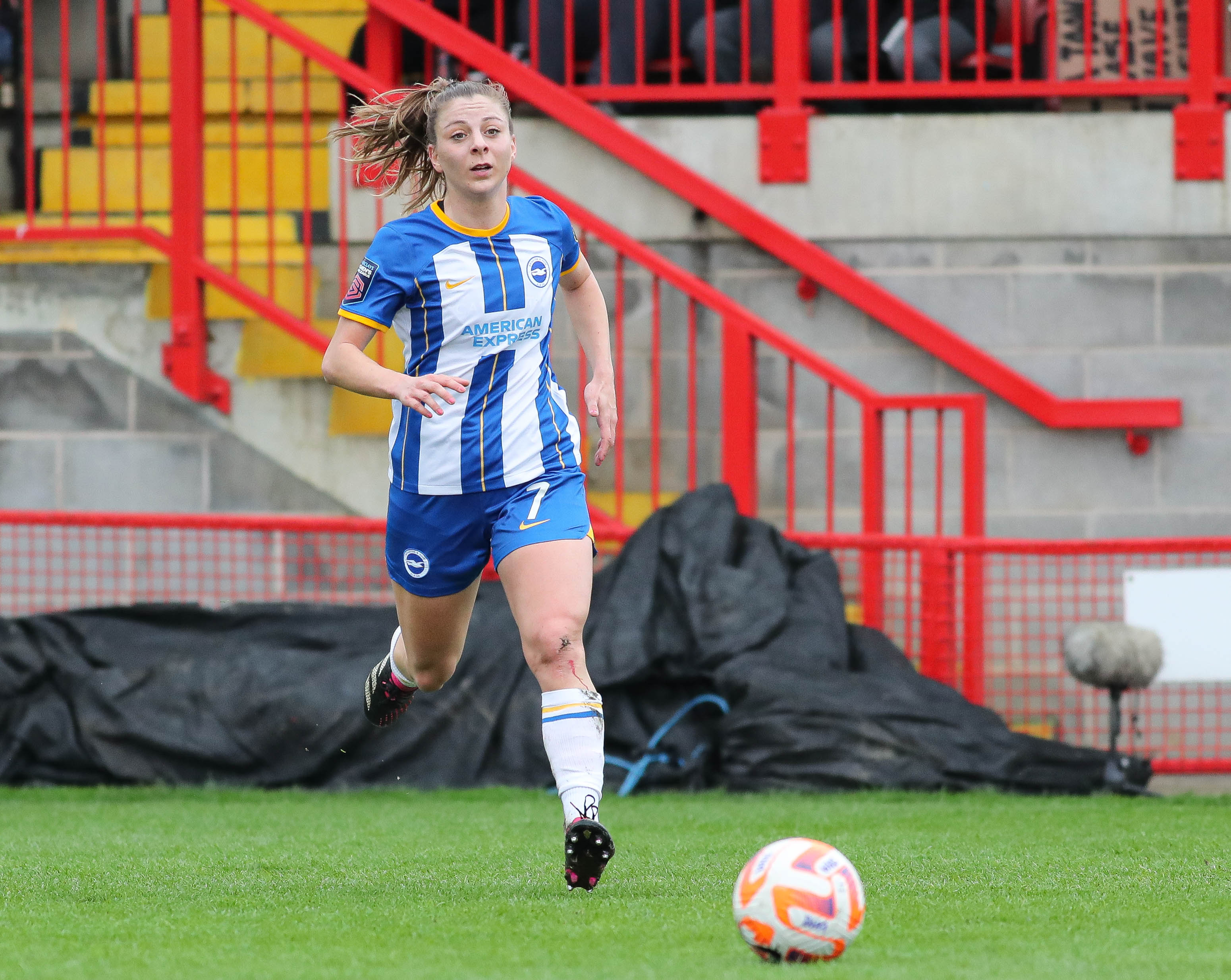
- Veatriki Sarri for Brighton & Hove Albion in 2023

Personal information
- Date of birth: 1 January 1998 (age 28)
- Place of birth: Chania, Greece
- Position: Winger

Team information
- Current team: Birmingham City
- Number: 27

Senior career*
Years	Team	Apps	(Gls)
2010–2016	AO Chania		
2016–2017	Leeds United	21	(17)
2017–2018	Fylde Ladies	3	(3)
2018–2021	Sheffield United	36	(4)
2021–2022	Birmingham City	22	(4)
2022–2024	Brighton & Hove Albion	41	(3)
2024–2025	Everton	18	(2)
2025–	Birmingham City	21	(7)

International career^{‡}
2013–2014	Greece U17	9	(2)
2015	Greece U19	3	(4)
2015–	Greece	67	(12)
- * Club domestic league appearances and goals as of 19:31, 26 June 2026 (UTC) ‡ National team caps and goals as of 6 May 2026

Veatriki Sarri (Greek: Βεατρίκη Σαρρή, IPA: [ve.aˈtrici saˈri]; born 1 January 1998) is a Greek professional footballer who plays as a midfielder for Women's Super League club Birmingham City and the Greece national team.

A mainstay of the Greece national team, Sarri began her senior career in her native island of Crete, but has played in England since 2016.

== Early life ==
Sarri grew up in the Greek island of Crete where she played football with her brother. She credits reading Kelly Smith's autobiography when she was 12 with helping her realise she could have a career as a footballer.

Her mother is English.

== Career ==
=== Leeds United ===
Sarri moved to England to attend university in Leeds, and played for Leeds United Ladies in 2017.

=== Fylde Ladies ===
She then moved to Fylde Ladies, competing for the Lancashire club during the 2017–18 season. In September 2017, she suffered an ACL injury which prematurely ended her season.

=== Sheffield United ===
After coming back from injury, Sarri moved to Sheffield United where she spent time with the team's development squad. She signed a new contract with the club in July 2020.

=== Birmingham City ===
In January 2021, Sarri moved to Women's Super League side Birmingham City. In doing so she became the first Greek player in the WSL. Sarri scored her first WSL goal in April 2021, an equaliser in the sixth minute of added time against Aston Villa.

In May 2022, Sarri turned down a new contract with the club, who had been relegated from the WSL at the end of the 2021–22 season.

=== Brighton & Hove Albion ===
In July 2022, Sarri joined Brighton & Hove Albion on a two-year deal. In March 2023, Sarri scored two goals in 13 minutes for Brighton during a 2–2 draw to Reading. On 5 June 2024, Brighton reported that Sarri and three other players would leave upon the expiration of their contracts.

=== Everton ===
On 26 July 2024, Sarri signed with Everton. She recorded her first league goal for the club against Aston Villa on 18 January 2025, scoring in the 89th minute.

=== Return to Birmingham City ===
On 16 July 2025, Sarri rejoined Birmingham City on a two-year contract. Sarri's free kick goal against Durham won the WSL 2 Goal of the Month for December 2025. It was also nominated for WSL 2 Goal of the Season.

With Birmingham City, Sarri won the WSL 2 title in May 2026, meaning the club would return to the WSL for the first time since her departure in 2021.

== International career ==
Sarri made her senior international debut for Greece in 2015.

Sarri was honoured as the women's Best Greek Player playing Abroad for the 2021–22, 2022–23, 2023–24, and 2024–25 seasons by the Panhellenic Professional Football Players Association.

== International goals ==
Scores and results list Greece's goal tally first, score column indicates score after each Sarri goal.

No.	Date	Venue	Opponent	Score	Result	Competition
1.	27 November 2015	Katerini Stadium, Katerini, Greece	Romania	1–2	1–3	UEFA Women's Euro 2017 qualifying
2.	8 April 2022	Lilleküla Stadium, Tallinn, Estonia	Estonia	3–1	3-1	2023 FIFA Women's World Cup qualification
3.	12 April 2022	Pampeloponnisiako Stadium, Patras, Greece	Estonia	1–0	3–0	2023 FIFA Women's World Cup qualification
4.	11 November 2022	Georgios Kamaras Stadium, Athens, Greece	Cyprus	1–0	4–0	Friendly
5.	14 November 2022	Georgios Kamaras Stadium, Athens, Greece	Cyprus	1–0	1–0	Friendly
6.	5 April 2024	Theodoros Vardinogiannis Stadium, Heraklion, Greece	Faroe Islands	1–0	1–0	UEFA Women's Euro 2025 qualifying
7.	9 April 2024	Estadi Nacional, Andorra la Vella, Andorra	Andorra	1–0	3–0	UEFA Women's Euro 2025 qualifying
8.	4 June 2024	Tórsvøllur, Tórshavn, Faroe Islands	Faroe Islands	1–0	2–0	UEFA Women's Euro 2025 qualifying
9.	12 July 2024	Theodoros Vardinogiannis Stadium, Heraklion, Greece	Andorra	2–0	6–0	UEFA Women's Euro 2025 qualifying
10.	21 February 2025	Theodoros Vardinogiannis Stadium, Heraklion, Greece	Slovenia	1–0	1–2	2025 UEFA Women's Nations League
11.	8 April 2025	Tallaght Stadium, Dublin, Ireland	Republic of Ireland	1–2	1–2	2025 UEFA Women's Nations League
12.	7 March 2026	Theodoros Vardinogiannis Stadium, Heraklion, Greece	Faroe Islands	1–0	2–0	2027 FIFA Women's World Cup qualification

== Honours ==
AO Chania

- Greek C Division: 2010–11
- Greek B Division: 2012–13

Birmingham City

- Women's Super League 2: 2025–26

Individual

- PSAPP Best Greek Female Player Abroad (5): 2021–22, 2022–23, 2023–24, 2024–25, 2025–26
- Brighton & Hove Albion Goal of the Season: 2023-24
