= Salar, Uzbekistan =

Salar Salar
- Location in Uzbekistan
- Coordinates: 41°23′0″N 69°21′30″E
- Country: Uzbekistan
- Region: Tashkent Region
- District: Qibray District

Population (1989)
  - Total: 25,521
- Time zone: UTC+5 (UZT)

Salar (Uzbek: Salor) is a town in Tashkent Region, Uzbekistan. It is part of Qibray District. In 1989, the town had a population of 25,521.

The town is home to the Inter Rohat Brewery.
