= Qibray District =

Qibray
- District
- Qibray tumani
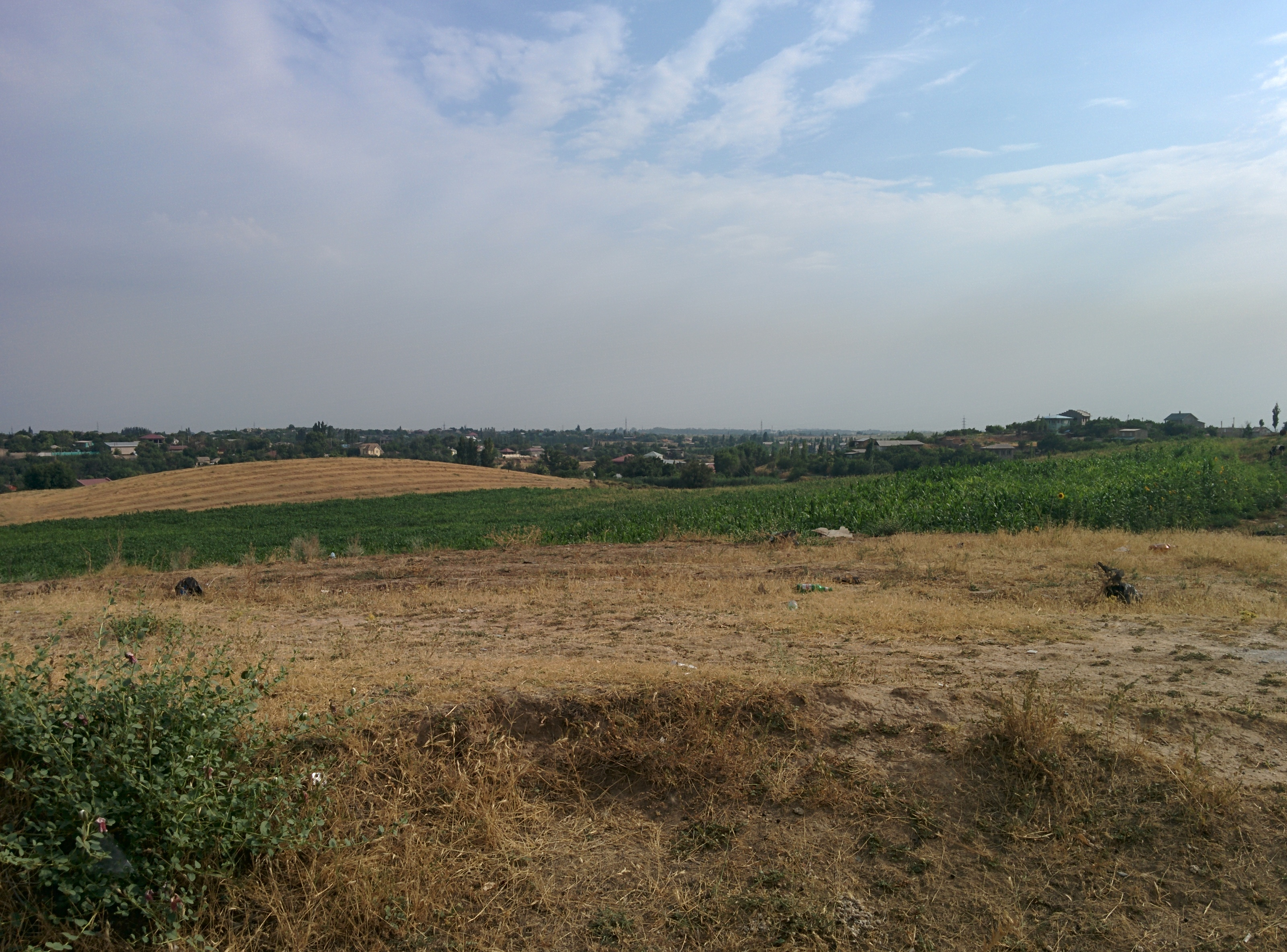

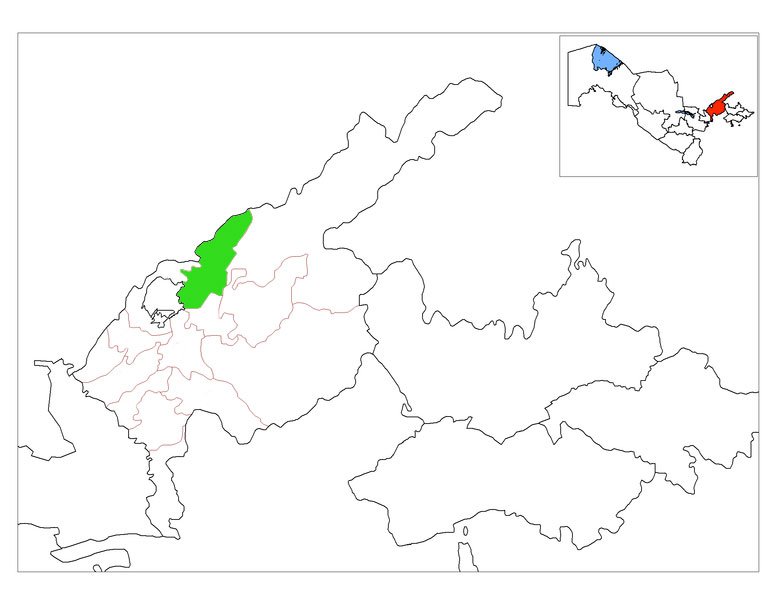
- Coordinates: 41.3897°N 69.4650°E
- Country: Uzbekistan
- Region: Tashkent Region
- Capital: Qibray
- Established: 1933

Area
  - Total: 559 km^{2} (216 sq mi)

Population (2021)
  - Total: 202,200
  - Density: 362/km^{2} (937/sq mi)
- Time zone: UTC+5 (UZT)
- Website: qibray.toshvil.uz

Qibray is a district of Tashkent Region in Uzbekistan. The capital lies at the town Qibray. It has an area of 560 km^{2} (220 sq mi) and it had 202,200 inhabitants in 2021. The district consists of 16 urban-type settlements (Qibray, Salar, Argin, Taraqqiyot, Alisherobod, Geofizika, Doʻrmon, Yoshlik, Koʻprik boshi, Madaniyat, Mustaqillik, Nurafshon, Uymaut, Unqoʻrgʻon-1, Oʻtkir, X.Amirov) and 10 rural communities.

== History ==
The district was formed in the 1930s under the name Ordzhonikidze district. In 1956, the Kazakh SSR transferred part of the lands of the Golodnaya Steppe to the Uzbek SSR. The Bostandyk district of the South Kazakhstan region (now the Bostanliq district of the Tashkent region), part of the Ordzhonikidze district (now the Qibray district of the Tashkent region) was also transferred. It was abolished in 1963 and restored in 1964. In 1992, it was renamed Qibray district.
