= Tokzhan Bekpenbetova =

Kazakhstani footballer

Personal information
- Full name: Тоқжан Бекпенбетова
- Date of birth: 18 May 1994 (age 32)
- Position: Forward

Team information
- Current team: Okzhetpes
- Number: 6

Senior career*
Years	Team	Apps	(Gls)
- Okzhetpes

International career^{‡}
2011	Kazakhstan U19	3	(0)
2016–	Kazakhstan	2	(0)
- * Club domestic league appearances and goals ‡ National team caps and goals as of 8 October 2019

Tokzhan Bekpenbetova (Kazakh: Тоқжан Бекпенбетова, Toqjan Bekpenbetova; born 18 May 1994) is a Kazakhstani footballer who plays as a forward for Women's Championship club FC Okzhetpes and the Kazakhstan women's national team.

== Club career ==
Before moving to Ukraine she played for ShVSM-Kairat and Okzhetepes. At the women's Champions League, she had 1 game: on 4 November 2020, she played all 120 minutes in a lost (1:2) home match against the Georgian Lanchkhutiі. In 2020 she became the silver medalist of the championship of Kazakhstan as part of "Okzhetpes".

In July 2021 she moved to Ukraine, where she signed an agreement with Voskhod. In the shirt of the club from Staraya Mayachka, she made her debut on 31 July 2021, in a draw (1:1) home match of the 1st round against Kryvbas. Tokzhan entered the field in the starting lineup, and in the sixty-sixth minute she was replaced by Kristina Romanova.

== International career ==
As a member of women's youth team of Kazakhstan (WU-19), she made her debut on 17 September 2011, in the lost (0:3) match of the 1st round of the group stage of the women's youth European championship against peers from Wales. Bekpenbet entered the field on the sixty-second minute, replacing Zulfiya Mirzaev. At the European Youth Women's Championship she entered the field in 3 games.

As a member of the national team of Kazakhstan, she made her debut on 2 June 2016, in the victorious (1:0) match of the European Women's Championship against Israel. Tokzhan entered the field on the sixty-third minute, replacing Ksenia Khairulin.
