= Asselkhan Turlybekova =

Kazakhstani footballer

Personal information
- Date of birth: 18 December 1998 (age 27)
- Height: 1.61 m (5 ft 3 in)
- Position: Midfielder

Team information
- Current team: Okzhetpes
- Number: 25

Senior career*
Years	Team	Apps	(Gls)
- Okzhetpes

International career^{‡}
- Kazakhstan
- * Club domestic league appearances and goals as of 19:40, 30 August 2019 (UTC) ‡ National team caps and goals as of 19:40, 30 August 2019 (UTC)

Asselkhan Turlybekova (Kazakh: Әселхан Төрегелдіқызы Турлыбекова; born 18 December 1998) is a Kazakhstani footballer who plays as a midfielder for Women's Championship club FC Okzhetpes and the Kazakhstan women's national team.

== Career ==
Turlybekova has been capped for the Kazakhstan national team, appearing for the team during the 2019 FIFA Women's World Cup qualifying cycle.

== International goals ==
No.	Date	Venue	Opponent	Score	Result	Competition
1.	15 June 2021	Vazgen Sargsyan Republican Stadium, Yerevan, Armenia	Armenia	3–0	3–0	Friendly
2.	28 June 2022	Pärnu Rannastaadion, Pärnu, Estonia	Estonia	1–0	2–4	2023 FIFA Women's World Cup qualification
3.	4 June 2024	Almaty Central Stadium, Almaty, Kazakhstan	Armenia	4–1	4–1	UEFA Women's Euro 2025 qualifying
4.	30 May 2025	Almaty Central Stadium, Almaty, Kazakhstan	Liechtenstein	2–0	4–0	2025 UEFA Women's Nations League
