= Võru FC Helios =

Estonian football club

- Full name: Võru Football Club Helios
- Founded: 2010
- Ground: Võru stadium
- Capacity: 1600
- Chairman: Jaanus Vislapuu
- Manager: Arsen Katšmazov
- League: II liiga
- 2024: II liiga N/E 10th
- Website: www.fcheliosvoru.ee
Home colours	Away colours

Võru FC Helios is an Estonian football club based in Võru. The club was founded in 2010. The team currently plays in the II liiga, the fourth highest level of Estonian football.

The team played IV liiga in 2014–2016. In the end of year 2016, Võru JK merged with the team and Helios got their place in II liiga. They ended 2017 with 3rd place and were promoted to Esiliiga B, where Helios played until 2020.

== Players ==
=== Current squad ===
As of 27 March 2024.

Note: Flags indicate national team as defined under FIFA eligibility rules; some limited exceptions apply. Players may hold more than one non-FIFA nationality.

No.	Pos.	Nation	Player
2	DF	EST	Arlet Raha
31	DF	EST	Trond Herman Meier
4	MF	EST	Hannes Helstein
5	MF	EST	Raul Rebane
6	MF	EST	Reijo Künnapuu
7	FW	EST	Andre Väin
8	MF	EST	Mattias Eskla
10	MF	EST	Kert Sander Eerik
11	MF	EST	Eduard Desjatski (captain)
12	DF	EST	Margo Minka
13	MF	EST	Kaspar Kimmel
16	MF	EST	Marek Jenas
17	MF	EST	Karl-Markkus Metslind
19	FW	EST	Verner Konnula
21	GK	EST	Pert Paigelkaln

No.	Pos.	Nation	Player
22	MF	UKR	Rustam Tadzhybaiev
23	MF	EST	Rico-Marten Vainu
24	DF	EST	Arsen Katšmazov
33	MF	EST	Johannes Luik
41	DF	EST	Mairo Reinsaar
47	GK	EST	Andrei Kiš
50	DF	EST	Tarvo Kunz
55	DF	EST	Ragnar Rebane
61	FW	EST	Christjan Truija
66	MF	EST	Emil Elrond Karu
77	MF	EST	Richard Lepp
79	MF	EST	Patrik Huma
88	MF	EST	Aimar Vendelin
91	DF	EST	Siimar Taits

== Statistics ==
=== League and Cup ===
Season	Division	Pos	Pld	W	D	L	GF	GA	GD	Pts	Avg. Att.	Top goalscorer	Cup
2014	IV liiga S	9	16	3	5	8	25	41	−16	38	14	Siim Lepp (11)	—
2015	IV liiga S	6	18	7	2	9	35	56	−21	23	37	Brett Piir (9)	—
2016	IV liiga S	4	18	9	1	8	41	43	−2	23	15	Kristjan Moks (7)	—
2017	II liiga N/E	3	26	15	4	7	55	30	+25	49	101	Kait Hinn (12)	—
2018	Esiliiga B	6	36	15	9	12	80	66	+14	54	163	Sander Taan (18)	—
2019	Esiliiga B	9	36	10	4	22	48	101	−53	34	76	Eduard Desjatski (7)	—
2020	Esiliiga B	8	30	10	5	15	55	68	−13	35	72	Eduard Desjatski (24)	Quarter-finalists
2021	II liiga N/E	5	23	12	5	6	82	44	+38	41	42	Eduard Desjatski (16)	—
2022	II liiga N/E	7	26	11	4	11	53	49	+4	37	57	Eduard Desjatski (17)	—
2023	II liiga N/E	10	26	8	4	14	66	77	−11	28	70	Andre Väin (17)	—
2024	II liiga N/E	10	26	9	5	12	43	79	−36	32	58	Andre Väin (12)	—
