= Kairi Himanen =

Estonian footballer (born 1992)

Personal information
- Full name: Kairi Himanen
- Date of birth: 11 November 1992 (age 33)
- Place of birth: Raikküla Parish, Estonia
- Position: Midfielder

Youth career
- 2003: Levadia Hagudi
- 2005: EVL

Senior career*
Years	Team	Apps	(Gls)
2006	EVL United	12	(3)
2007–2019	Pärnu	178	(61)
2007–2019	Pärnu II	42	(24)
2020–2024	Saku Sporting	93	(31)

International career
2009–2010	Estonia U19	11	(0)
2009–2024	Estonia	81	(6)
- * Club domestic league appearances and goals

Kairi Himanen (born 11 November 1992) is a retired Estonian footballer who played as a midfielder for Naiste Meistriliiga club Saku Sporting, Pärnu and EVL United.

She has represented the Estonia women's national football team at youth and senior level.

== International goals ==
No.	Date	Venue	Opponent	Score	Result	Competition
1.	6 February 2015	EJL Football Hall, Tallinn, Estonia	Latvia	1–0	2–0	Friendly
2.	13 June 2021	Central Stadium of Jonava, Jonava, Lithuania	Latvia	3–0	4–1	2021 Baltic Cup
3.	8 April 2022	Lilleküla Stadium, Tallinn, Estonia	Greece	1–2	1–3	2023 FIFA Women's World Cup qualification
4.	28 June 2022	Pärnu Rannastaadion, Pärnu, Estonia	Kazakhstan	2–2	4–2	2023 FIFA Women's World Cup qualification
5.	31 October 2023	Lilleküla Stadium, Tallinn, Estonia	Armenia	4–1	5–1	2023–24 UEFA Women's Nations League C
6.	31 May 2024	Lilleküla Stadium, Tallinn, Estonia	Albania	1–1	1–2	UEFA Women's Euro 2025 qualifying
