= Qibray =

- Urban-type settlement
- Location in Uzbekistan
- Coordinates: 41°23′23″N 69°27′54″E
- Country: Uzbekistan
- Region: Tashkent Region
- District: Qibray District
- Urban-type settlement status: 1973

Population (2011)
  - Total: 27,750
- Time zone: UTC+5 (UZT)

Qibray (Uzbek: Qibray, Russian: Кибрай) is an urban-type settlement in Tashkent Region, Uzbekistan. It is the capital of Qibray District.

== Presidential Residence ==
Since coming to power in December 2016, President Shavkat Mirziyoyev has used majority of Baytqorqon near Qibray to build his new residence, which would include a presidential highway and a presidential compound. As a result of the construction in the district, over 200 people have been displaced from their homes. There have been claims by interior designers for the project that the residence will be decorated with Argentinian blue marble slabs and Swarovski crystals.
