= Aigerim Aitymova =

Kazakhstani footballer

Personal information
- Date of birth: 14 February 1993 (age 33)
- Height: 1.77 m (5 ft 10 in)
- Position: Midfielder

Team information
- Current team: Okzhetpes
- Number: 77

Senior career*
Years	Team	Apps	(Gls)
- Okzhetpes

International career^{‡}
- Kazakhstan
- * Club domestic league appearances and goals as of 19:40, 30 August 2019 (UTC) ‡ National team caps and goals as of 19:40, 30 August 2019 (UTC)

Aigerim Aitymova (Kazakh: Әйгерім Талғатқызы Айтымова; born 14 February 1993) is a Kazakhstani footballer who plays as a midfielder for Women's Championship club FC Okzhetpes and the Kazakhstan women's national team.

== Career ==
Aitymova has been capped for the Kazakhstan national team, appearing for the team during the 2019 FIFA Women's World Cup qualifying cycle.
