= Getter Saar (footballer) =

Estonian footballer (born 1999)

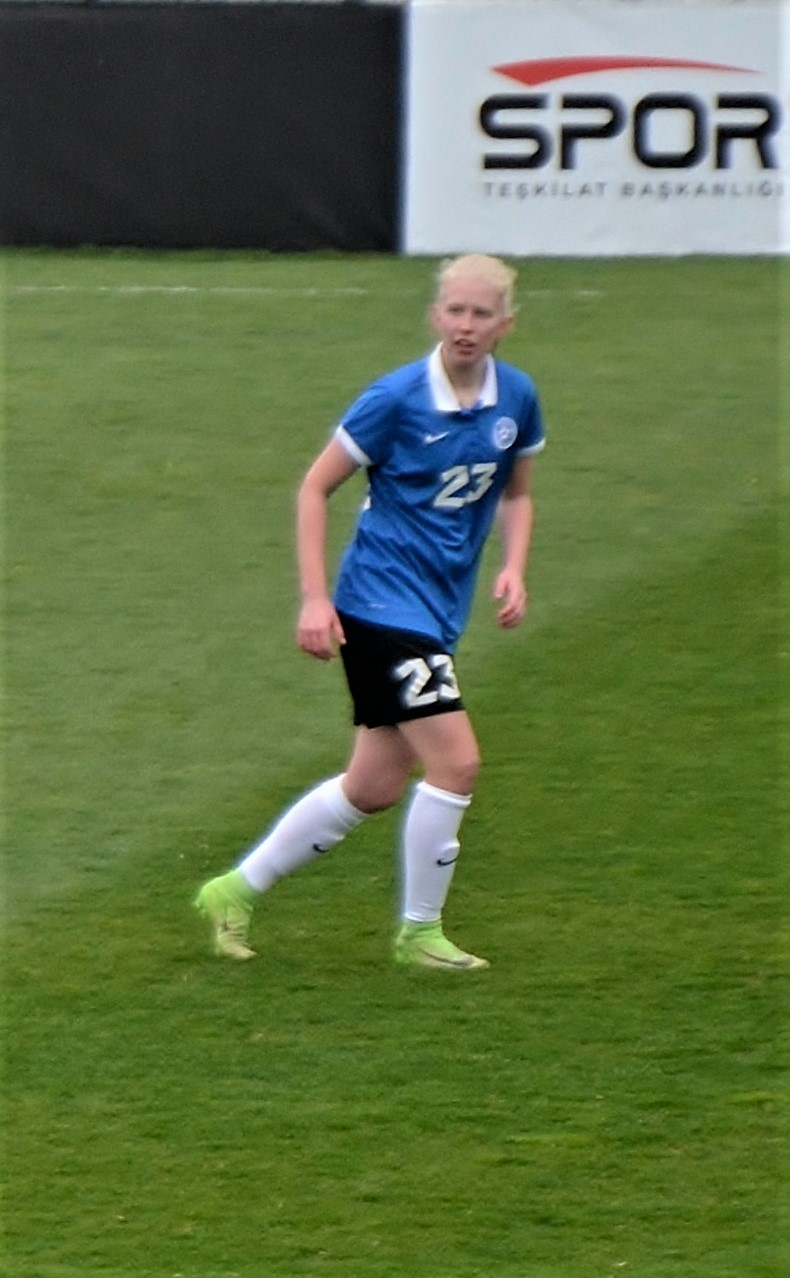
- Saar with Estonia in 2018

Personal information
- Date of birth: 9 November 1999 (age 27)
- Place of birth: Tallinn, Estonia
- Position: Forward

Team information
- Current team: Flora
- Number: 61

Senior career*
Years	Team	Apps	(Gls)
- Audentes / Noortekoondis
2016-	Flora		

International career^{‡}
2019–	Estonia	16	(3)
- * Club domestic league appearances and goals ‡ National team caps and goals as of 1 September 2023

Getter Saar (born 9 November 1999) is an Estonian footballer who plays as a forward for Flora and the Estonia women's national team.

== Career ==
Saar made her debut for the Estonia national team on 4 October 2019 against Turkey, coming on as a substitute for Signy Aarna.

== International goals ==
No.	Date	Venue	Opponent	Score	Result	Competition
1.	28 June 2022	Pärnu Rannastaadion, Pärnu, Estonia	Kazakhstan	1–2	4-2	2023 FIFA Women's World Cup qualification
2.	28 June 2022	Pärnu Rannastaadion, Pärnu, Estonia	Kazakhstan	3–2	4-2	2023 FIFA Women's World Cup qualification
3.	6 September 2022	Shakhter Stadium, Karagandy, Kazakhstan	Kazakhstan	2–0	2–0	2023 FIFA Women's World Cup qualification
