= Pampeloponnisiako Stadium =

Stadium in Patras, Greece

Coordinates: 38°13′18.50″N 21°45′07.88″E

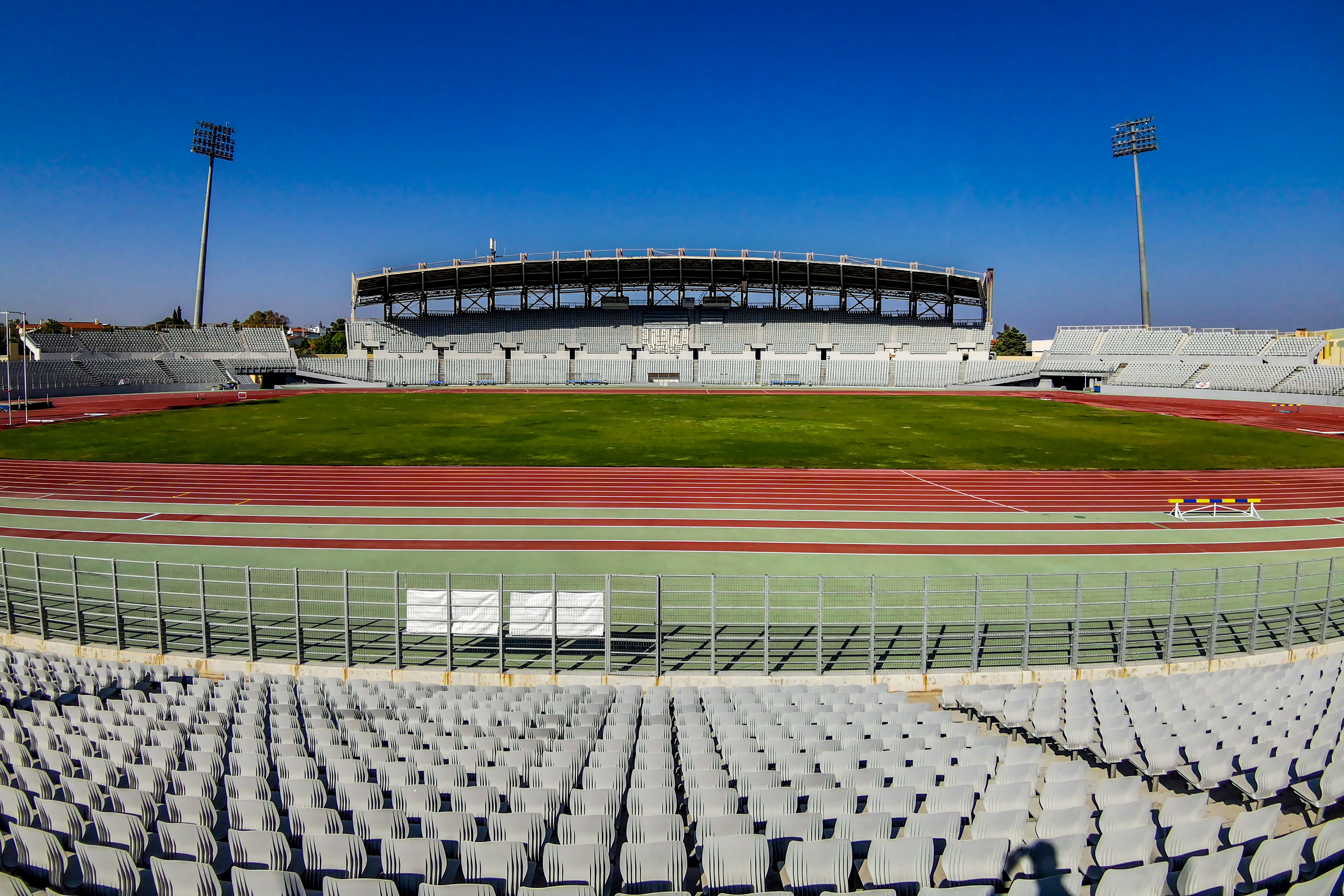
- Interactive map of Pampeloponnisiako Stadium
- Full name: Pampeloponnisiako Stadium
- Former names: National Stadium of Patras
- Location: Patras, Greece
- Owner: Public Real Estate Company S.A. (state-owned)
- Operator: Municipality of Patras
- Capacity: 23,588 (expandable to 30,000)
- Surface: Grass
- Scoreboard: 2
- Public transit: Aghios Andreas railway station

Construction
- Built: 1981
- Opened: 1981
- Renovated: 2004
- Cost: 30,000,000 € (2004)
- Architects: Grammatopoulos-Panousakis and associates

Tenant
- Panachaiki

Pampeloponnisiako Stadium (Greek: Παμπελοποννησιακό Στάδιο, "Pan-Peloponnese Stadium") is a stadium located in Patras, Greece. It was built in 1981 and was originally known as the National Stadium of Patras (Εθνικό Στάδιο Πατρών, Ethniko Stadio Patron).

In 2002, reconstruction works began and it reopened on 8 August 2004, just in time to host football (soccer) matches for the 2004 Summer Olympics. The stadium seats 23,588, though only 18,900 seats were publicly available for the Olympic matches.

It is owned by the Public Real Estate Company S.A., a state-owned company, and it is operated by the Municipality of Patras.
