= 2023 in Estonian football =

Football in Estonia
- Season: 2023

Men's football
- Meistriliiga: Tallinna FC Flora
- Esiliiga: FC Nõmme United
- Esiliiga B: Tartu JK Welco
- Beach football: BSC Thunder Arvutitark
- Futsal: Tallinna FC Cosmos
- Tipneri karikas: JK Narva Trans
- Supercup: Paide Linnameeskond

Women's football
- Meistriliiga: Tallinna FC Flora
- Esiliiga: Tallinna FC Ararat
- Futsal: –
- Estonian Cup: Saku Sporting
- Supercup: Tallinna FC Flora

This page summarizes everything related to Estonian football in the year 2023. It contains information about different league systems, national teams, futsal, beach football and most important transfers.

== National teams ==
Times are EET/EEST, (Note: EEST (UTC+3) for dates between 26 March and 29 October 2023 and between 31 March and 27 October 2024, and EET (UTC+2) for all other dates.) as listed by UEFA.

=== Association football ===
==== Men ====
===== Senior =====
The Estonian men's senior football team started the year with a training camp in Portugal, playing friendly matches against Sweden and Finland. Most players were from the Premium Liiga because the games didn't match the FIFA international schedule, so players from foreign clubs had to stick with their teams. In March, they entered a new qualifying tournament and held a lead against Austria for about 40 minutes but ended up losing 1–2. The next match against Azerbaijan ended in a 1–1 draw. However, the team faced difficulties in the following six qualifying games, resulting in a not-so-great goal difference of 0:19.

8 January Friendly	Iceland	1–1	Estonia	Albufeira, Portugal
19:00 (UTC+3)	Guðjohnsen 90' (pen.)	Report	44' Zenjov	Stadium: Estadio da Nora; Referee: Miguel Nogueira (Portugal)

12 January Friendly	Finland	0–1	Estonia	Albufeira, Portugal
19:00 (UTC+3)		Report	84' Miller	Stadium: Estadio da Nora; Referee: Gustavo Correia (Portugal)

23 March Friendly	Hungary	1–0	Estonia	Budapest, Hungary
19:00 (UTC+3)	Ádám 41'	Report		Stadium: Puskas Arena; Attendance: 37,804; Referee: Walter Altmann (Austria)

27 March 2024 EC qualifying — first round	Austria	2–1	Estonia	Linz, Austria
21:45 (UTC+3)	Kainz 68'; Gregoritsch 88'	Report	25' Sappinen	Stadium: Raiffeisen Arena; Attendance: 16,500; Referee: Enea Jorgji (Albania)

17 June 2024 EC qualifying — first round	Azerbaijan	1–1	Estonia	Baku, Azerbaijan
19:00 (UTC+3)	Kryvotsyuk 62'	Report	27' Sappinen	Stadium: Dalga Arena; Attendance: 3,900; Referee: Ondřej Berka (Czech Republic)

20 June 2024 EC qualifying — first round	Estonia	0–3	Belgium	Tallinn, Estonia
21:45 (UTC+3)		Report	37', 40' Lukaku; 90' Bakayoko	Stadium: A. Le Coq Arena; Attendance: 11,772; Referee: John Beaton (Scotland)

9 September 2024 EC qualifying — first round	Estonia	0–5	Sweden	Tallinn, Estonia
21:45 (UTC+3)		Report	18' Gyökeres; 24' Kulusevski; 39' Isak; 75' Quaison; 90+2' Claesson	Stadium: A. Le Coq Arena; Attendance: 11,411; Referee: Horațiu Feșnic (Romania)

12 September 2024 EC qualifying — first round	Belgium	5–0	Estonia	Brussels, Belgium
21:45 (UTC+3)	Vertonghen 4'; Trossard 18'; Lukaku 56', 58'; De Ketelaere 88'	Report		Stadium: King Baudouin Stadium; Attendance: 24,127; Referee: Bartosz Frankowski (Poland)

13 October 2024 EC qualifying — first round	Estonia	0–2	Azerbaijan	Tallinn, Estonia
21:45 (UTC+3)		Report	9' Bayramov; 45+4' (pen.) Sheydayev	Stadium: A. Le Coq Arena; Attendance: 5,652; Referee: Robert Schröder (Germany)

17 October Friendly	Estonia	1–1	Thailand	Tallinn, Estonia
19:00 (UTC+3)	Anier	Report	76' Praisuwan	Stadium: A. Le Coq Arena; Attendance: 1,502; Referee: Trustin Farrugia Cann (Malta)

16 November 2024 EC qualifying — first round	Estonia	0–2	Austria	Tallinn, Estonia
20:00 (UTC+3)		Report	25' Laimer; 39' Lienhart	Stadium: A. Le Coq Arena; Attendance: 4,488; Referee: Nikola Dabanović (Montenegro)

19 November 2024 EC qualifying — first round	Sweden	2–0	Estonia	Solna, Sweden
19:00 (UTC+3)	Claesson 22'; Forsberg 55'	Report		Stadium: Friends Arena; Attendance: 11,201; Referee: Fabio Maresca (Italy)

===== U21 =====
24 March Friendly	Bahrain	3–3	Estonia	Budaiya, Bahrain
20:30 (UTC+3)	M. Mubarak 46'; Hasan 50'; H. Mubarak 69'	Report	49' (o.g.) Alsubaiei; 58' Mihhailov; 90' (pen.) Viidas	Stadium: Hamad Town Stadium; Referee: Ismaeel Habib (Bahrain)

26 March Friendly	Bahrain	1–1	Estonia	Budaiya, Bahrain
21:30 (UTC+3)	Kamel 86'	Report	61' (pen.) Šapovalov	Stadium: Hamad Town Stadium; Referee: Mohamed Jamal (Bahrain)

20 June 2025 EC qualifying — first round	Kosovo	2–0	Estonia	Pristina, Kosovo
21:00	Llugiqi 40'; Hoti 70'	Report		Stadium: Fadil Vokrri Stadium; Attendance: 2,000; Referee: Joey Kooij (Netherlands)

7 September 2025 EC qualifying — first round	Estonia	1–1	Bulgaria	Tallinn, Estonia
17:30	Šapovalov 15' (pen.)	Report	8' Nikolov	Stadium: Kadriorg Stadium; Attendance: 327; Referee: Jasper Vergoote (Belgium)

12 September 2025 EC qualifying — first round	Estonia	0–1	Poland	Tallinn, Estonia
19:00		Report	81' Szymczak	Stadium: Lilleküla Stadium; Attendance: 379; Referee: Stefan Ebner (Austria)

TBD (Note: The Israel v Estonia match was originally to be played on 12 October 2023, 18:00 (19:00 IST), but was postponed due to the Gaza war.) 2025 EC qualifying — first round	Israel	v	Estonia	TBD
		Report

17 October 2025 EC qualifying — first round	Poland	5–0	Estonia	Stalowa Wola, Poland
19:00	Rakoczy 8'; Zalewski 22'; Szymczak 44', 58'; Pieńko 72'	Report		Stadium: Subcarpathian Football Center; Attendance: 3,544; Referee: Mohammad Usman Aslam (Norway)

17 November 2025 EC qualifying — first round	Germany	v	Estonia	Germany
		Report

21 October 2025 EC qualifying — first round	Bulgaria	v	Estonia	Bulgaria
		Report

===== U19 =====
21 February Friendly	Hungary	0–0	Estonia	Valencia, Spain
16:00 (UTC+3)		Report		Stadium: Camps de Futbol Oliva Nova; Referee: Francisco José Ortega Herrera (Spain)

23 February Friendly	Estonia	1–2	Hungary	Valencia, Spain
16:00 (UTC+3)	Luts 17' (pen.)	Report	11' Jurek; 48' Bálint	Stadium: Camps de Futbol Oliva Nova; Referee: Jose Miguel Carballa Minana (Spain)

22 March 2023 EC qualifying — elite round	Estonia	0–3	Greece	Waterford, Ireland
21:30		Report	21', 27' (pen.) Tzimas; 90+6' Nikolaou	Stadium: Waterford Regional Sports Centre; Referee: Ivar Orri Kristjansson (Iceland)

25 March 2023 EC qualifying — elite round	Republic of Ireland	1–0	Estonia	Crossabeg, Ireland
21:30	Kevin Zefi 66' (pen.)	Report		Stadium: Ferrycarrig Park; Referee: Luca Cibelli (Switzerland)

28 March 2023 EC qualifying — elite round	Slovakia	3–1	Estonia	Waterford, Ireland
21:30	Gajdoš 56', 89'; Sauer 67'	Report	87' Õunapuu	Stadium: Waterford Regional Sports Centre; Referee: Luca Cibelli (Switzerland)

15 November 2024 EC qualifying — qualifying round	France	v	Estonia	France

18 November 2024 EC qualifying — qualifying round	Denmark	v	Estonia	France

21 November 2024 EC qualifying — qualifying round	Estonia	v	Iceland	France

===== U17 =====
31 August Friendly	Sweden	v	Estonia	Stockholm, Sweden

3 September Friendly	Sweden	v	Estonia	Stockholm, Sweden

15 November 2024 EC qualifying — qualifying round	France	v	Estonia	Romania

18 November 2024 EC qualifying — qualifying round	Norway	v	Estonia	Romania

21 November 2024 EC qualifying — qualifying round	Estonia	v	Romania	Romania

==== Women ====
===== Senior =====
15 February Friendly	Estonia	1–2	Kosovo	Alanya, Turkey
17:30 (UTC+3)	Kubassova 12'	Report	33' Ejupi; 69' Memeti	Stadium: Goldcity Sport Complex; Referee: Parida Lutpaliyeva (Turkey)

18 February Unofficial friendly	Estonia	8–1	Kyrgyzstan	Turkey
13:00 (UTC+3)	Himanen 1'; Lillemäe 3'; Niit 10'; Merisalu 12'; Saar 15'; Saulus 52', 85'; Daut 88'	Report	64' Omurbekova	Stadium: Türkler Fields; Referee: Altan Öscar (Turkey)

18 February Friendly	Jordan	Cancelled	Estonia	Alanya, Turkey
17:30 (UTC+3)				Stadium: Goldcity Sport Complex

21 February Friendly	Estonia	1–1	North Macedonia	Alanya, Turkey
14:00 (UTC+3)	Tammik 21'	Report	66' Andonova	Stadium: Goldcity Sport Complex; Referee: Farida Lutfaliyeva (Azerbaijan)

7 April Friendly	Estonia	1–2	Malta	Tallinn, Estonia
19:00 (UTC+3)	Merisalu 88'	Report	73' Bugeja; 89' Farrugia	Stadium: Sportland Arena; Attendance: 302; Referee: Lina Lehtovaara (Finland)

11 April Friendly	Estonia	v	Ukraine	Tallinn, Estonia
19:00 (UTC+3)				Stadium: Sportland Arena

===== U17 =====
8 February Friendly	Spain	12–0	Estonia	Madrid, Spain
12:00 (UTC+3)	Comendador 8'; Redondo 14', 24'; Lopez 17'; Alguacil 19'; García 50', 80'; Garcia 63', 75'; Escot 64' (pen.); Ortega 77'; Cerrato 86'	Report		Stadium: La Ciudad del Fútbol; Referee: Patricia Gomez (Spain)

8 March 2024 EC qualifying — second round	Estonia	0–2	Poland	Buftea, Romania
11:00 (UTC+3)		Report	18', 45+2' Gliszczyńska	Stadium: Football Centre FRF; Referee: Audrey Gerbel (France)

11 March 2024 EC qualifying — second round	Czech Republic	5–0	Estonia	Buftea, Romania
11:00 (UTC+3)	Krejčová 14'; Jakubů 35'; Kroupova 39'; Vithova 53' (pen.), 84'	Report		Stadium: Football Centre FRF; Referee: Oxana Cruc (Moldova)

14 March 2024 EC qualifying — second round	Romania	4–3	Estonia	Buftea, Romania
16:00 (UTC+3)	Boboc 11'; Mihaescu 43', 57'; Stancu 67'	Report	63' (pen.) Orlova; 79' Õispuu; 82' Mirjam	Stadium: Football Centre FRF; Referee: Lotta Vuorio (Finland)

5 April Friendly	Poland	6–0	Estonia	Nowy Dwór Mazowiecki, Poland
13:00 (UTC+3)	Jagodzinska 18'; Witkowska 26' (pen.); Gliszczynska 38'; Ilisson 78' (o.g.); Gutowska 85' (pen.); Kuprowska 90'	Report		Stadium: MKS Swit stadium Referee: Ewelina Fidorczuk-Sipko (Poland)

=== Futsal ===
==== Men ====
===== Senior =====
11 January Futsal Week	Estonia	1–7	Romania	Poreč, Croatia
18:00 (UTC+3)	Bõstrov 17'	Report	3' Hadnagy; 7' Kanyo; 10' Araujo; 20' Iszlai; 22' Ferreira; 32' Craciun; 40' Nastai	Stadium: Finida Hall; Referee: Vedran Marcinko (Croatia)

12 January Futsal Week	Hungary	7–0	Estonia	Poreč, Croatia
15:30 (UTC+3)	Vas 7'; Nagy 13'; Naal 16' (o.g.); Suscsak 17', 34'; Szalmas 27'; Rutai 39'	Report		Stadium: Finida Hall; Referee: Aleš Peric Mocnik (Croatia)

13 January Futsal Week	Estonia	1–2	Greenland	Poreč, Croatia
15:00 (UTC+3)	Mõttus 4'	Report	4' Funch; 38' Eriksen	Stadium: Finida Hall; Referee: Aleš Peric Mocnik (Croatia)

14 January Futsal Week	Bosnia and Herzegovina	5–0	Estonia	Poreč, Croatia
18:00 (UTC+3)	Boskin 13' (o.g.); Gosto 16'; Smajic 33'; Brkanic 37'; Milanovic 40'	Report		Stadium: Finida Hall; Referee: Jernej Petek (Croatia)

4 March Friendly	Iraq	4–0	Estonia	Rabat, Morocco
19:00		Report

6 March Friendly	Morocco	11–0	Estonia	Rabat, Morocco
19:00		Report

7 March Friendly	Morocco	10–0	Estonia	Rabat, Morocco
19:00		Report

13 April Friendly	Estonia	0–3	Georgia	Tallinn, Estonia
19:30		Report	13' Saiotti; 25' (o.g.) Heinaru; 32' Chimakadze	Stadium: Kalev Sports Hall; Attendance: 88; Referee: Eduardas Fatkullins (Latvia)

14 April Friendly	Estonia	2–9	Georgia	Tallinn, Estonia
14:00	Vnukov 28'; Zahharov 29'	Report	7' Chimakadze; 9' Nacimento; 13', 34' Kekelia; 22' Todua; 26' (o.g.) Gussev; 38' Ivarashvili; 38' Dacunha; 39' Bragacavalcante	Stadium: Kalev Sports Hall; Attendance: 42; Referee: Eduardas Fatkullins (Latvia)

===== U19 =====
4 January Futsal Week	Belgium	7–0	Estonia	Poreč, Croatia
19:15 (UTC+3)	Al Houss 17', 25'; Van Cauter 26'; Aabdi 30'; Peirsman 33'; Cardeon 34'; Piric 39'	Report		Stadium: Finida Hall; Referee: Dino Kramar (Croatia)

6 January Futsal Week	San Marino	0–6	Estonia	Poreč, Croatia
16:30 (UTC+3)	Gussev 12', 13', 18'; Bažkov 15', 25'; Agaptšev 25'	Report		Stadium: Finida Hall; Referee: Sergeis Šacmans (Croatia)

7 January Futsal Week	Estonia	2–5	Turkey	Poreč, Croatia
16:30 (UTC+3)	Agaptšev 10'; Gaidai 15'	Report	5', 27' Doganay; 14' Gümüs; 20' Karaca; 40' (o.g.) Gaidai	Stadium: Finida Hall; Referee: Yasin Alageyik (Croatia)

18 January 2024 EC qualifying — first round	Estonia	1–1	Lithuania	Druskininkai, Lithuania
19:30 (UTC+3)	Bažkov 9:47	Report	33:14 Siaurusevičius	Stadium: LSC Hall; Referee: Drazen Vukcevic (Montenegro), Martin Køster (Denmark)

19 January 2024 EC qualifying — first round	Estonia	4–5	England	Druskininkai, Lithuania
19:30 (UTC+3)	Bažkov 1:00, 17:54; Raužin 7:21; Agaptšev 39:32	Report	1:19 Kaye; 3:47 Sikirwayi; 15:49 Desborough; 28:30 Badham; 29:58 Devine	Stadium: LSC Hall; Referee: Bogdan Hanceariuc (Romania), Drazen Vukcevic (Montenegro)

21 January 2024 EC qualifying — first round	Malta	4–3	Estonia	Druskininkai, Lithuania
19:30 (UTC+3)	Gatt 18:03; Sammut 21:00, 22:28; Agius 23:55	Report	4:30, 13:58 Bažkov; 36:48 Männi	Stadium: LSC Hall; Referee: Bogdan Hanceariuc (Romania), Drazen Vukcevic (Montenegro)

== League system ==
=== Association football ===
==== Men ====
===== Premium liiga =====
Pos	Team	Pld	W	D	L	GF	GA	GD	Pts	Promotion, qualification or relegation
1	Tallinna FC Flora (C)	36	23	10	3	74	24	+50	79	Champions League first qualifying round
2	Tallinna FCI Levadia	36	22	11	3	67	24	+43	77	Conference League first qualifying round
3	JK Tallinna Kalev	36	14	11	11	49	41	+8	53	Conference League first qualifying round
4	Paide Linnameeskond	36	13	14	9	50	34	+16	53	
5	Nõmme Kalju FC	36	12	13	11	50	42	+8	49	
6	Pärnu JK Vaprus	36	12	12	12	40	43	−3	48	
7	FC Kuressaare	36	12	7	17	36	60	−24	43	
8	JK Narva Trans	36	12	2	22	32	64	−32	38	
9	Tartu JK Tammeka	36	5	12	19	33	65	−32	27	Play-off for Esiliiga
10	Harju JK Laagri (R)	36	5	8	23	27	61	−34	23	Esiliiga

Source: EJL
Rules for classification: 1) Points; 2) Less matches awarded against; 3) Head-to-head points; 4) Head-to-head goal difference; 5) Matches won; 6) Goal difference; 7) Goals scored; 8) Away goals scored; 9) Fairplay ranking.
(C) Champions; (R) Relegated
Locations of the 2023 Meistriliiga teams

Relegation play-off:

Team 1	Agg.	Team 2	1st leg	2nd leg
Viimsi JK (Esiliiga 2nd)	1–6	Tartu JK Tammeka (Meistriliiga 9th)	0–5	1–1

===== Esiliiga =====
Pos	Team	Pld	W	D	L	GF	GA	GD	Pts	Promotion, qualification or relegation
1	FC Nõmme United (C, P)	36	28	6	2	114	29	+85	90	Meistriliiga
2	Viimsi JK	36	21	8	7	67	35	+32	71	Promotion play-off
3	Tallinna FC Flora U21 (Note: Reserve teams are ineligible for promotion.)	36	22	3	11	86	53	+33	69	
4	Tallinna FCI Levadia U21	36	16	9	11	57	46	+11	57	
5	JK Tabasalu	36	18	1	17	81	70	+11	55	
6	FC Tallinn	36	16	4	16	72	65	+7	52	
7	Paide Linnameeskond U21	36	12	5	19	66	82	−16	41	
8	FC Elva	36	12	4	20	45	75	−30	40	Play-off for Esiliiga B
9	Tallinna JK Legion (R)	36	5	6	25	37	97	−60	21	Esiliiga B
10	Ida-Virumaa FC Alliance (R)	36	6	2	28	50	123	−73	20	Esiliiga B

Source: EJL
Rules for classification: 1) Points; 2) Less matches awarded against; 3) Head-to-head points; 4) Head-to-head goal difference; 5) Matches won; 6) Goal difference; 7) Goals scored; 8) Away goals scored; 9) Fairplay ranking.
(C) Champions; (P) Promoted; (R) Relegated
Notes:
Locations of the 2023 Esiliiga teams

Relegation play-off:

Team 1	Agg.	Team 2	1st leg	2nd leg
FA Tartu Kalev (Esiliiga B 4th)	1–2	FC Elva (Esiliiga 8th)	0–0	1–2 (AET)

===== Esiliiga B =====
Pos	Team	Pld	W	D	L	GF	GA	GD	Pts	Promotion, qualification or relegation
1	Tartu JK Welco (C, P)	36	23	5	8	92	42	+50	74	Esiliiga
2	JK Tallinna Kalev U21 (P)	36	19	10	7	99	53	+46	67	Esiliiga
3	JK Narva Trans U21	36	19	7	10	69	48	+21	64	
4	FA Tartu Kalev	36	18	7	11	85	71	+14	61	Promotion play-off
5	FC Kuressaare U21	36	17	10	9	87	76	+11	61	
6	Viljandi JK Tulevik	36	16	7	13	58	55	+3	55	
7	Tartu JK Tammeka U21	36	12	8	16	63	70	−7	44	
8	Nõmme Kalju FC U21	36	12	5	19	90	103	−13	41	Play-off for II liiga
9	Läänemaa JK	36	8	2	26	67	120	−53	26	Play-off for II liiga
10	Pärnu JK (R)	36	3	5	28	34	106	−72	14	II liiga

Source: EJL
Rules for classification: 1) Points; 2) Less matches awarded against; 3) Head-to-head points; 4) Head-to-head goal difference; 5) Matches won; 6) Goal difference; 7) Goals scored; 8) Away goals scored; 9) Fairplay ranking.
(C) Champions; (P) Promoted; (R) Relegated
Locations of the 2023 Esiliiga B teams

Relegation play-off:

Team 1	Agg.	Team 2	1st leg	2nd leg
Harju JK Laagri U21 (II S/W 1st)	1–2	Nõmme Kalju FC U21 (Esiliiga B 8th)	1–2	0–0

Team 1	Agg.	Team 2	1st leg	2nd leg
Jõhvi FC Phoenix (II N/E 2nd)	11–3	Saku Sporting (II S/W 5th)	6–1	5–2
Jõhvi FC Phoenix (play-off winner)	5–6	Läänemaa JK (Esiliiga B 9th)	3–0	2–6 (AET)

===== II liiga =====
Group A (North & East)
Pos	Team	Pld	Pts
1	Maardu Linnameeskond (C, P)	26	69
2	Jõhvi FC Phoenix & JK Noova	26	58
3	Rakvere JK Tarvas	26	58
4	Tallinna FCI Levadia U19	26	51
5	Viimsi JK II	26	49
6	Tartu JK Welco II	26	45
7	FC Tallinn U21	26	42
8	FA Tartu Kalev II	26	35
9	Tartu FC Helios	26	31
10	Võru FC Helios	26	28
11	Lasnamäe FC Ajax	26	24
12	Tallinna FC Ararat	26	22
13	Kohtla-Järve JK Järve (R)	26	5
14	Valga FC Warrior (R)	26	3

Source: EJL
(C) Champions; (P) Promoted; (R) Relegated

Group B (South & West)
Pos	Team	Pld	Pts
1	Harju JK Laagri U21 (C)	26	67
2	Pärnu JK Vaprus U21	26	60
3	Tallinna FC Flora U19	26	58
4	FC Hiiumaa & Läänemaa JK II	26	42
5	Saku Sporting	26	39
6	FC Nõmme United U21	26	37
7	Pärnu JK Tervis	26	36
8	Vändra JK Vaprus	26	35
9	Saue JK	26	35
10	JK Tabasalu U21	26	32
11	Raplamaa JK	26	30
12	Keila JK	26	25
13	FC Kose (R)	26	16
14	Pärnu JK Poseidon (R)	26	10

Source: EJL
(C) Champions; (R) Relegated

Champion's match:

Final	Maardu Linnameeskond	w/o	Harju JK Laagri U21	Maardu, Estonia
				Stadium: Maardu kunstmuruväljak

Relegation play-off:

Team 1	Agg.	Team 2	1st leg	2nd leg
Sillamäe FC NPM Silmet (III E 5th)	w/o	— (III N 2nd)	—	—
Sillamäe FC NPM Silmet (play-off winner)	7–3	Tallinna FC Ararat (II N/E 12th)	2–2	5–1

Team 1	Agg.	Team 2	1st leg	2nd leg
Tabasalu Ulasabat C.F. (III W 2nd)	w/o	— (III S 2nd)	—	—
Tabasalu Ulasabat C.F. (play-off winner)	7–0	Keila JK (II S/W 12th)	3–0	4–0

===== III liiga =====
Group A (North)
Pos	Team	Pld	Pts
1	Tallinna FC Zapoos (C)	18	49
2	Tallinna SC ReUnited	18	38
3	Tallinna FC Maksatransport	18	34
4	Tallinna FC Zenit	18	29
5	Tallinna FC Eston Villa	18	28
6	Tallinna FC Hell Hunt	18	26
7	Tallinna JK Piraaja	18	22
8	Tallinna FC Wise	18	14
9	Tallinna FC Olympic Olybet	18	13
10	Tallinna FC Ararat II	18	8

Source: EJL
(C) Champions

Group B (South)
Pos	Team	Pld	Pts
1	Tartu Team Helm (C)	20	49
2	FC Otepää	20	43
3	Tartu JK Welco X	20	43
4	FC Elva II	20	41
5	Põlva Lootos	20	33
6	SK Imavere	20	29
7	FC Vastseliina	20	28
8	Viljandi JK Tulevik & Suure-Jaani United	20	22
9	Tartu JK Tammeka III	20	16
10	Tõrva JK	20	13
11	FC Jõgeva Wolves	20	4

Source: EJL
(C) Champions

Group C (East)
Pos	Team	Pld	Pts
1	Paide Linnameeskond III (C)	22	66
2	JK Loo	22	45
3	Türi Ganvix JK	22	40
4	Jõgeva Noorus-96	22	39
5	Sillamäe FC NPM Silmet	22	34
6	FC Maardu Aliens	22	33
7	Rakvere JK Tarvas II	22	29
8	JK Kuusalu Kalev	22	25
9	Raasiku FC Joker	22	22
10	Anija JK	22	22
11	Põhja-Tallinna JK Volta	22	15
12	FC Järva-Jaani	22	13

Source: EJL
(C) Champions

Group D (West)
Pos	Team	Pld	Pts
1	Tallinna JK Puuma (C)	18	51
2	Tabasalu Ulasabat C.F.	18	49
3	JK Tallinna Kalev Juunior	18	32
4	Rummu Dünamo	18	25
5	Rumori Calcio Tallinn	18	24
6	Tallinna JK Legion II	18	24
7	Läänemaa JK Haapsalu	18	21
8	Harju JK Laagri III	18	19
9	Tallinna FC Flora IV	18	19
10	Saku Sporting II	18	1

Source: EJL
(C) Champions

Champion's match:

4 November Semifinal	Paide Linnameeskond III	2–1	Tallinna FC Zapoos	Paide, Estonia
14:30 UTC+03	Rivo Reinson 70'; Carl Tubarik 79'	Report	90+2' Oliver Karlson	Stadium: Paide kunstmurustaadion Attendance: 36; Referee: Andree Porila

Semifinal	Tallinna JK Puuma	w/o	Tartu Team Helm

12 November Final	Paide Linnameeskond III	5–4	Tartu Team Helm	Paide, Estonia
16:30 UTC+03	Martin Ustaal 18'; Jüri Jevdokimov 53' (pen.), 84' (pen.); Rivo Reinson 59'; Rene Puhke 79'	Report	34' (pen.), 55', 90+4' (pen.) Rait Läll; 44' Karl Albert Türn	Stadium: Paide kunstmuruväljak Attendance: 45; Referee: Rasmus Maalinn

===== IV liiga =====
Group A (North / East)
Pos	Team	Pld	Pts
1	Kristiine JK (C)	20	54
2	Aruküla FC Vigri	20	42
3	Tallinna FC Eston Villa II	20	36
4	FC Kose II	20	30
5	Tallinna Maksatransport II	20	28
6	FC Tallinna Gorillad	20	27
7	Tallinna FC Soccernet	20	24
8	Püssi SK & Kohtla-Järve FC Järve	20	21
9	FC Toompea	20	20
10	Põhja-Tallinna JK Volta II & JK Arsenal	20	18
11	Kohila Püsivus	20	15

Source: EJL
(C) Champions

Group B (North / West)
Pos	Team	Pld	Pts
1	Tabasalu Ulasabat C.F. II (C)	20	47
2	Märjamaa Kompanii	20	42
3	FCP Pärnu	20	40
4	Saue II	20	37
5	Tallinna EstHam United	20	29
6	Tallinna JK Jalgpallihaigla	20	28
7	Tallinna Reaal	20	26
8	Tallinna Wolves	20	22
9	Lelle & Vändra Vaprus II	20	16
10	Tallinna Rumori Calcio II	20	7
11	Tallinna Piraaja II (D)	20	17

Source: EJL
(C) Champions; (D) Disqualified

21 October Final	Kristiine JK	3–0	Tabasalu Ulasabat C.F. II	Tallinn, Estonia
13:00 UTC+03	Tauri Leppik 45+2', 50'; Jesper Talviste 80'	Report		Stadium: Wismari jalgpallistaadion Attendance: 116; Referee: Maksim Ševelilov

==== Women ====
===== Naiste Meistriliiga =====
Pos	Team	Pld	W	D	L	GF	GA	GD	Pts	Promotion, qualification or relegation
1	Tallinna FC Flora	26	25	1	0	147	13	+134	76	Qualification for the Champions League first qualifying round
2	Saku Sporting	26	17	4	5	84	30	+54	55	
3	Tartu JK Tammeka	26	14	5	7	70	33	+37	47	
4	JK Tallinna Kalev	26	11	3	12	45	47	−2	36	
5	JK Tabasalu	26	8	8	10	43	48	−5	32	
6	Viimsi JK	26	5	3	18	21	78	−57	18	
7	Põlva FC Lootos	21	3	1	17	15	71	−56	10	Qualification for the relegation tournament
8	Pärnu JK Vaprus & Viljandi JK Tulevik ÜN	21	2	3	16	11	116	−105	9	Qualification for the relegation tournament

Source: EJL
Rules for classification: 1) Points; 2) Less matches awarded against; 3) Head-to-head points; 4) Head-to-head goal difference; 5) Matches won; 6) Goal difference; 7) Goals scored; 8) Away goals scored; 9) Fairplay ranking.
Locations of the 2023 Naiste Meistriliiga teams

Relegation tournament:

Pos	Team	Pld	W	D	L	GF	GA	GD	Pts	Promotion, qualification or relegation
1	Tallinna FC Ararat	4	2	2	0	11	2	+9	8	Promotion to Naiste Meistriliiga
2	Põlva FC Lootos	4	2	2	0	9	2	+7	8	Promotion to Naiste Meistriliiga
3	Pärnu JK Vaprus & Viljandi JK Tulevik ÜN	4	0	0	4	0	16	−16	0	Relegation to Naiste Esiliiga
4	Lasnamäe FC Ajax	0	0	0	0	0	0	0	0	Relegation to Naiste Esiliiga

Updated to match(es) played on 19 October. Source: EJL
Rules for classification: 1) Points; 2) Less matches awarded against; 3) Head-to-head points; 4) Head-to-head goal difference; 5) Matches won; 6) Goal difference; 7) Goals scored; 8) Away goals scored; 9) Fairplay ranking.

===== Naiste Esiliiga =====
Pos	Team	Pld	W	D	L	GF	GA	GD	Pts	Promotion, qualification or relegation
1	Tallinna FC Ararat	21	14	4	3	77	34	+43	46	Qualification for the promotion tournament
2	Tallinna FC Flora II	21	14	3	4	84	29	+55	45	
3	Lasnamäe FC Ajax	21	14	1	6	78	48	+30	43	Qualification for the promotion tournament
4	FC Elva	21	11	1	9	49	43	+6	34	
5	Tartu JK Tammeka II	20	6	3	11	42	73	−31	21	
6	Tallinna FC Levadia	20	6	3	11	29	43	−14	21	
7	JK Tallinna Kalev II	21	4	3	14	41	79	−38	15	
8	Saku Sporting II	21	4	2	15	28	79	−51	14	

Updated to match(es) played on 24 October. Source: EJL
Rules for classification: 1) Points; 2) Less matches awarded against; 3) Head-to-head points; 4) Head-to-head goal difference; 5) Matches won; 6) Goal difference; 7) Goals scored; 8) Away goals scored; 9) Fairplay ranking.
Locations of the 2023 Naiste Esiliiga teams

=== Futsal ===
==== Men ====
===== Coolbet saaliliiga =====
Main phase:

Pos	Team	Pld	W	D	L	GF	GA	GD	Pts	Promotion, qualification or relegation
1	Tallinna FC Cosmos	18	16	1	1	145	35	+110	49	Championship play-off quarterfinal
2	Viimsi FC Smsraha	18	15	0	3	111	48	+63	45	Championship play-off quarterfinal
3	Sillamäe FC NPM Silmet	18	13	2	3	90	58	+32	41	Championship play-off quarterfinal
4	Jõhvi FC Phoenix	18	10	1	7	75	80	−5	31	Championship play-off quarterfinal
5	Tartu Ravens Futsal	18	10	0	8	83	83	0	30	Championship play-off quarterfinal
6	Narva United FC	18	6	2	10	64	90	−26	20	Championship play-off quarterfinal
7	Aruküla Radius	18	6	1	11	56	58	−2	19	Championship play-off quarterfinal
8	JK Kohila	18	4	1	13	53	89	−36	13	Championship play-off quarterfinal
9	Rummu Dünamo (O)	18	4	0	14	62	108	−46	12	Relegation play-offs
10	FC Jõgeva Wolves (R)	18	2	0	16	45	135	−90	6	Relegation

Source: EJL
Rules for classification: 1) Points; 2) Less matches awarded against; 3) Head-to-head points; 4) Head-to-head goal difference; 5) Matches won; 6) Goal difference; 7) Goals scored; 8) Draw.
(O) Play-off winners; (R) Relegated
Locations of the 2022-23 Coolbet Saaliliiga teams

Play-offs:

Quarterfinal
1	Tallinna FC Cosmos	7	6	–	–	2
8	JK Kohila	3	3	–	–	0
4	Jõhvi FC Phoenix	0	3	–	–	0
5	Tartu Ravens Futsal	6	5	–	–	2
2	Viimsi FC Smsraha	7	10	–	–	2
7	Aruküla Radius	0	1	–	–	0
3	Sillamäe FC NPM Silmet	12	11	–	–	2
6	Narva United FC	5	5	–	–	0

Semifinal
1	Tallinna FC Cosmos	10	6	–	–	2
5	Tartu Ravens Futsal	1	3	–	–	0
2	Viimsi FC Smsraha	2 (4)	2	3	–	1
3	Sillamäe FC NPM Silmet	2 (3)	4	4	–	2

Final
1	Tallinna FC Cosmos	6	4
3	Sillamäe FC NPM Silmet	1	1
Third place
5	Tartu Ravens Futsal	–	–	–	–	2
2	Viimsi FC Smsraha	–	–	–	–	5

Relegation play-off:

Team 1	Agg.	Team 2	1st leg	2nd leg
Kadrina Vitamin Well (Esiliiga 3rd)	—	Rummu Dünamo (Coolbet Saaliliiga 9th)	—	—

===== Saalijalgpalli Esiliiga =====
Pos	Team	Pld	W	D	L	GF	GA	GD	Pts	Promotion, qualification or relegation
1	Tallinna FC Cosmos II (Note: Reserve teams are ineligible for promotion.) (C)	16	14	2	0	119	49	+70	44	
2	Tallinna FC Bunker Partner (P)	16	11	1	4	129	78	+51	34	Promotion
3	Kadrina Vitamin Well	16	10	1	5	119	89	+30	31	Promotion play-offs
4	Saku Sporting Rapla	16	8	0	8	88	78	+10	24	
5	Narva United FC II	16	6	1	9	74	82	−8	19	
6	Sillamäe FC NPM Silmet II	16	6	0	10	83	95	−12	18	
7	FC Äksi Wolves	16	5	1	10	94	147	−53	16	
8	Narva SK Ganza	16	5	1	10	67	100	−33	16	
9	FC Otepää	16	3	1	12	65	120	−55	10	

Source: EJL
Rules for classification: 1) Points; 2) Less matches awarded against; 3) Head-to-head points; 4) Head-to-head goal difference; 5) Matches won; 6) Goal difference; 7) Goals scored; 8) Draw.
(C) Champions; (P) Promoted
Notes:
Locations of the 2022-23 Saali Esiliiga teams

== Cup competitions ==
=== Association football ===
==== Men ====
===== Tipneri karikavõistlused =====
Quarterfinals
PL	FC Kuressaare	1 (3)
PL	Tallinna FC Flora	1 (5)
II	Jõhvi FC Phoenix & JK Noova	1
PL	Tartu JK Tammeka	6
EL	JK Tabasalu	2
EL	FC Tallinn	1
PL	JK Narva Trans	0 (4)
PL	Paide Linnameeskond	0 (3)

Semifinals
PL	Tallinna FC Flora	1
PL	Tartu JK Tammeka	0
EL	JK Tabasalu	0
PL	JK Narva Trans	1

Final
PL	Tallinna FC Flora	1
PL	JK Narva Trans	2

Home teams listed on top of bracket. (AET): At Extra Time, (PL): Premium liiga, (EL): Esiliiga, (II): II liiga

===== Small Cup =====
Quarterfinals
II	Rakvere JK Tarvas	1
III	Tallinna FC Zapoos	2
III	Tallinna FC Zenit	1 (1)
III	Tartu Team Helm	1 (3)
III	Paide Linnameeskond III	3
II	Tallinna FC Flora U19	2
III	Türi JK Ganvix	1
II	Saue JK	9

Semifinals
III	Tallinna FC Zapoos	2
III	Tartu Team Helm	0
III	Paide Linnameeskond III	2
II	Saue JK	3

Final
III	Tallinna FC Zapoos	0
II	Saue JK	2

Home teams listed on top of bracket. (II): II liiga, (III): III liiga

== European competitions ==
=== Association football ===
==== Men ====
Tallinna Flora

11 July 2023 Champions League Q1	Raków Częstochowa (Poland)	1–0	(Estonia) Tallinna FC Flora	Częstochowa, Poland
21:00	Kocherhin 54'	Report		Stadium: Miejski Stadion Piłkarski "Raków"; Referee: Arda Kardeşler (Türkiye)

18 July 2023 Champions League Q1	Tallinna FC Flora (Estonia)	0–3	(Poland) Raków Częstochowa	Tallinn, Estonia
20:00		Report	47', 59' Zwoliński; 85' Papanikolaou	Stadium: Lilleküla Stadium; Attendance: 3,204; Referee: Marian Alexandru Barbu (Romania)

10 August 2023 Conference League Q3	FCV Farul Constanța (Romania)	3–0	(Estonia) Tallinna FC Flora	Ovidiu, Romania
20:30	Alibec 48'; Budescu 80'; Queirós 90+5'	Report		Stadium: Stadionul Viitorul; Attendance: 4,076; Referee: Ioannis Papadopoulos (Greece)

16 August 2023 Conference League Q3	Tallinna FC Flora (Estonia)	0–2	(Romania) FCV Farul Constanța	Tallinn, Estonia
19:00		Report	3' Rivaldinho; 18' Budescu	Stadium: Lilleküla Stadium; Attendance: 1,010; Referee: Luka Bilbija (Bosnia and Herzegovina)

Tallinna Levadia

13 July 2023 Conference League Q1	MŠK Žilina (Slovakia)	2–1	(Estonia) Tallinna FCI Levadia	Žilina, Slovakia
18:30	Ďuriš 7'; Myslovič 90+3' (pen.)	Report	51' Agyiri	Stadium: Štadión pod Dubňom; Attendance: 3,579; Referee: David Dickinson (Scotland)

20 July 2023 Conference League Q1	Tallinna FCI Levadia (Estonia)	1–2	(Slovakia) MŠK Žilina	Tallinn, Estonia
19:45	Agyiri 10'	Report	3' Rusnák; 45+2' Stojchevski	Stadium: Lilleküla Stadium; Attendance: 2,495; Referee: Miloš Savović (Montenegro)

Paide Linnameeskond

12 July 2023 Conference League Q1	B36 Tórshavn (Faroe Islands)	0–0	(Estonia) Paide Linnameeskond	Tórshavn, Faroe Islands
21:00		Report		Stadium: Gundadalur; Attendance: 645; Referee: Lothar D'hondt (Belgium)

20 July 2023 Conference League Q1	Paide Linnameeskond (Estonia)	0–2 (a.e.t.)	(Faroe Islands) B36 Tórshavn	Tallinn, Estonia
18:30		Report	92' Nielsen; 95' Przybylski	Stadium: Kadriorg Stadium (Note: Paide Linnameeskond will play their home match at the Kadriorg Stadium in Tallinn, instead of their regular stadium, the Paide linnastaadion in Paide, which did not meet UEFA requirements.); Attendance: 1,391; Referee: Vitaliy Romanov (Ukraine)

Narva Trans

13 July 2023 Conference League Q1	FC Pyunik (Armenia)	2–0	(Estonia) JK Narva Trans	Abovyan, Armenia
18:00	Juričić 65'; Kraizmer 88' (o.g.)	Report		Stadium: Abovyan City Stadium (Note: Pyunik will play their home match at the Abovyan City Stadium in Abovyan, instead of their regular stadium, the Vazgen Sargsyan Republican Stadium in Yerevan.); Attendance: 2,500; Referee: Kyriakos Athanasiou (Cyprus)

20 July 2023 Conference League Q1	JK Narva Trans (Estonia)	0–3	(Armenia) FC Pyunik	Rakvere, Estonia
18:30		Report	8' Dashyan; 14' Juninho; 66' Juričić	Stadium: Rakvere Linnastaadion (Note: Narva Trans will play their home match at the Rakvere Linnastaadion in Rakvere, instead of their regular stadium, the Narva Kreenholm Stadium in Narva, which did not meet UEFA requirements.); Attendance: 394; Referee: Andrew Davey (Northern Ireland)

== Notable transfers ==
Players are listed in an alphabetical order. Players with an "*" behind their name have changed teams inside and outside of Meistriliiga. Player's last team is listed as "free agent" if he has not represented a team in the previous six months. Player's next team is listed as "free agent" if he has not found a new club within the following six months.

=== Inside Meistriliiga ===
Listed are players, who have joined or left a club participating in the 2023 Meistriliiga. The player must have represented the Estonian national team at least once. The list may also contain more known players, who have either changed their club inside the lower leagues or retired from football.

Name	Pos.	Age	From	To	Date	Notes	Ref
Mihkel Ainsalu	MF	26	(Netherlands) SC Telstar	Tallinna FCI Levadia	19.02	Contract with Telstar terminated. Signed a two-year contract with Levadia.	
Ilja Antonov	MF	30	Tallinna FCI Levadia	Nõmme Kalju FC	10.02	Contract with Levadia ended. Signed a contract with Kalju.	
Trevor Elhi	DF	29	Nõmme Kalju FC	career break	01.01	Contract with Kalju terminated.	
Markus Jürgenson	DF	35	Tallinna FCI Levadia	free agent	01.01	Contract with Levadia ended.	
Ragnar Klavan	DF	37	Paide Linnameeskond	free agent	01.01	Contract with Paide ended.	
Artur Kotenko	GK	41	Tallinna FCI Levadia	retired	01.01	Contract with Levadia ended.	
Märten Kuusk	DF	26	(Hungary) Újpest FC	Tallinna FC Flora	09.02	Signed a 6 month loan deal with Flora.	
Maksim Podholjuzin	DF	30	Tallinna FCI Levadia	Nõmme Kalju FC	05.01	Contract with Levadia ended. Signed a contract with Kalju.	
Edgar Tur	MF	26	Paide Linnameeskond	Tallinna FCI Levadia	11.01	Contract with Paide ended. Signed a contract with Levadia.	

=== Outside Meistriliiga ===
Listed are all Estonian footballers, who have joined or left a foreign team.

Name	Pos.	Age	From	To	Date	Notes	Ref
Matvei Igonen	GK	26	(Poland) Podbeskidzie Bielsko-Biała	(Bulgaria) FC Hebar Pazardzhik	10.07	Signed a one-year contract with Hebar.	
Nikita Ivanov	FW	19	Tallinna JK Legion	(Slovenia) NK Rogaška	01.02	Signed a 1.5 year contract with Rogaška.	
Maksim Kalimullin	FW	16	FC Tallinn	(Poland) Legia Warsaw U19	06.03	Joined Legia's youth team.	
Stevin Kerge	MF	16	(Finland) Helsingin Jalkapalloklubi U19	(Poland) Legia Warsaw U19	06.03	Joined Legia's youth team.	
Robert Kirss*	FW	28	Tallinna FCI Levadia	(Poland) Sandecja Nowy Sącz	04.01	Contract with Levadia ended. Signed a 1.5 year contract with Sandecja.	
Vladislav Kreida*	MF	23	Tallinna FC Flora	(Republic of Ireland) St Patrick's Athletic F.C.	12.01	Signed a 1 year loan deal, which has an option to buy, with St Patrick's.	
Brent Lepistu*	MF	29	Tallinna FCI Levadia	(Romania) CS Mioveni	17.01	Contract with Levadia ended. Signed a 6 month deal with Mioveni.	
Karol Mets	DF	29	(Switzerland) FC Zürich	(Germany) FC St. Pauli	05.01	Signed a 6 month loan deal with St. Pauli.	
Karl-Romet Nõmm	GK	25	Tallinna FC Flora	(Poland) Sandecja Nowy Sącz	25.01	Signed a 1.5 year contract with Sandecja.	
Maksim Paskotši	DF	20	(England) Tottenham Hotspur F.C.	(Switzerland) Grasshopper Club Zürich	06.09	Signed a three-year contract with Grasshopper.	
Artur Pikk	DF	29	Tallinna FCI Levadia	(Poland) Odra Opole	04.01	Contract with Levadia ended. Signed a 1.5+2 year contract with Odra.	
Markus Poom	MF	23	Tallinna FC Flora	(Republic of Ireland) Shamrock Rovers F.C.	16.01	Signed a 1 year loan deal with Shamrock.	
Mark Oliver Roosnupp*	MF	25	Tallinna FCI Levadia	(Serbia) FK Napredak Kruševac	04.01	Signed a 1.5 year contract with Napredak.	
Rauno Sappinen	FW	27	(Poland) Piast Gliwice	(Poland) Stal Mielec	24.01	Signed a 6 month loan deal with Stal.	
Rauno Sappinen	FW	27	(Poland) Stal Mielec	(Poland) Piast Gliwice	30.06	Loan deal with Stal ended.	
Rauno Sappinen	FW	27	(Poland) Piast Gliwice	(Israel) Hapoel Jerusalem F.C.	13.07	Signed a 1+2 year contract with Hapoel.	
Rauno Sappinen	FW	27	(Israel) Hapoel Jerusalem F.C.	free agent	08.09	Contract with Hapoel terminated.	
Ramol Sillamaa	FW	18	JK Tallinna Kalev	(Belgium) K.A.A. Gent II	27.07	Signed a two-year contract with Gent.	
Andreas Vaher	DF	18	(Italy) S.P.A.L. U19	(Germany) SC Freiburg II	06.01	Signed a 3.5 year contract with Freiburg.	
Markus Vaherna	FW	23	JK Tallinna Kalev	(Italy) US Offanenghese 1933	01.01	–	
Bogdan Vaštšuk	MF	27	(Poland) Stal Mielec	(Republic of Ireland) Sligo Rovers F.C.	05.01	Signed a 2+1 year contract with Sligo.	
Bogdan Vaštšuk	MF	27	(Republic of Ireland) Sligo Rovers F.C.	(Serbia) FK Voždovac	01.08	Contract with Sligo terminated. Signed a one-year contract with Voždovac.	

=== Foreign players ===
Listed are all foreign players that have joined or left a team participating in the 2023 Meistriliiga.

Name	Pos.	Age	From	To	Date	Notes	Ref
(Ghana) David Addy	DF	33	Tartu JK Tammeka	free agent	01.01	Contract with Tammeka ended.	
(Ghana) Thomas Agyepong	FW	26	free agent	Paide Linnameeskond	01.07	Signed a contract with Paide.	
(Ghana) Ernest Agyiri	MF	25	Tallinna FCI Levadia	(Denmark) Randers FC	02.08	Signed a three-year contract with Randers.	
(Nigeria) Ahmed Adebayo Basher	FW	21	(Latvia) Leevon Saldus	Tartu JK Tammeka	28.07	Signed a two-year contract with Tammeka.	
(Latvia) Ivan Baturins	GK	25	Tallinna JK Legion	Harju JK Laagri	19.02	Signed a contract with Harju.	
(Georgia (country)) Zakaria Beglarishvili	MF	32	Tallinna FCI Levadia	(Uzbekistan) FK Turon Yaypan	14.02	Signed a contract with Turon.	
(Cameroon) Mollo Bessala	FW	19	(Cameroon) Kadji Sports Academy	Tallinna FCI Levadia	02.03	Signed a two-year contract with Levadia.	
(Poland) Eugenio Bracelli	DF	21	(Italy) RC Codogno 1908	Tartu JK Tammeka	13.02	Signed a two-year contract with Tammeka.	
(The Gambia) Babou Cham	FW	24	(Armenia) FC Ararat Yerevan	Paide Linnameeskond	13.03	Signed a contract with Paide.	
(The Gambia) Babou Cham	FW	24	Paide Linnameeskond	FC Nõmme United	26.07	Signed a six month loan deal with Nõmme United	
(Nigeria) Promise David	FW	21	(Malta) Sirens F.C.	Nõmme Kalju FC	13.02	Signed a contract with Kalju.	
(The Gambia) Modou Lamin Demba	FW	20	(The Gambia) Real de Banjul FC	Paide Linnameeskond	13.03	Signed a loan deal with Paide.	
(The Gambia) Modou Lamin Demba	FW	20	Paide Linnameeskond	(The Gambia) Real de Banjul FC	30.06	Loan deal with Paide ended.	
(France) Djibril Dianessy	FW	26	free agent	Nõmme Kalju FC	28.02	Signed a two-year contract with Kalju.	
(France) Djibril Dianessy	FW	27	Nõmme Kalju FC	(Belgium) RAAL La Louvière	06.07	Contract with Kalju terminated. Signed a new contract with La Louvière.	
(South Korea) Kim Do-hyun	MF	28	(Slovenia) NK Triglav Kranj	JK Narva Trans	13.03	Signed a contract with Trans.	
(South Korea) Kim Do-hyun	MF	28	JK Narva Trans	(Indonesia) Persela Lamongan	22.08	Contract with Trans terminated. Signed a new contract with Lamongan.	
(Finland) Anton Eerola	FW	23	(Germany) 1. FC Kaiserslautern II	Nõmme Kalju FC	17.02	Signed a three-year contract with Kalju.	
(Finland) Anton Eerola	FW	23	Nõmme Kalju FC	(Finland) JIPPO Joensuu	25.07	Contract with Kalju terminated. Signed a new contract with JIPPO.	
(Brazil) Felipe Felicio	FW	20	(Brazil) Clube Atlético Mineiro	Tallinna FCI Levadia	20.01	Signed a 1 year loan deal with Levadia.	
(Finland) Oskari Forsman	GK	34	(Finland) Vaasan Palloseura	JK Tallinna Kalev	16.01	Signed a contract with Kalev.	
(The Gambia) Alieu Gibba	MF	19	(The Gambia) Real de Banjul FC	Paide Linnameeskond	31.08	Signed a contract with Paide.	
(Brazil) Heitor	DF	22	(Brazil) Grêmio	Tallinna FCI Levadia	10.01	Signed a contract with Levadia.	
(Guinea-Bissau) Usalifa Indi	MF	23	(Portugal) AC Vila Meã	Harju JK Laagri	19.02	Signed a contract with Harju.	
(Liberia) William Jebor	FW	31	Nõmme Kalju FC	(Malta) Valletta F.C.	27.01	Contract with Kalju ended. Signed a contract with Valletta.	
(United States) Zyen Jones	FW	22	(Hungary) Ferencvárosi TC II	Nõmme Kalju FC	28.07	Signed a 0.5+2 year contract with Kalju.	
(Brazil) João Pedro	MF	21	(Brazil) Club Athletico Paranaense	Tallinna FCI Levadia	09.07	Signed a contract with Levadia.	
(United States) Vuk Latinovich	DF	25	(United States) New York City FC	Tallinna FCI Levadia	26.01	Signed a two-year contract with Levadia.	
(United States) Vuk Latinovich	DF	25	Tallinna FCI Levadia	(Greece) GS Ilioupolis	12.09	Contract with Levadia terminated. Signed a new contract with Ilioupolis	
(Brazil) Liliu	FW	32	Tallinna FCI Levadia	(Brazil) Paraná Clube	05.04	Contract with Levadia ended. Signed a contract with Paraná Clube.	
(Ukraine) Illya Markovskyi	FW	25	(Israel) Hapoel Haifa F.C.	Tallinna FCI Levadia	03.01	Signed a two-year contract with Levadia.	
(Serbia) Milan Mitrović	DF	34	Tallinna FCI Levadia	(Serbia) FK Radnički 1923	27.01	Contract with Levadia ended. Signed a contract with Radnički.	
(Belgium) Olivier Rommens	MF	28	(Lithuania) FK Sūduva	Nõmme Kalju FC	10.02	Signed a two-year contract with Kalju.	
(Germany) Marius Samoura	DF	22	free agent	Harju JK Laagri	19.02	Signed a contract with Harju.	
(Tajikistan) Rustam Soirov	FW	20	Tallinna FCI Levadia	(Uzbekistan) PFC Lokomotiv Tashkent	01.01	Contract terminated. Signed a contract with Lokomotiv Tashkent.	
(Colombia) Harlin Suárez	MF	28	(Finland) Kotkan Työväen Palloilijat	JK Narva Trans	20.02	Signed a contract with Trans.	
(Croatia) Daniel Sudar	MF	24	Nõmme Kalju FC	(Austria) FC Marchfeld Donauauen	01.01	Contract with Kalju ended. Signed a contract with Marchfeld Donauauen.	
(The Gambia) Bubacarr Tambedou	FW	20	Paide Linnameeskond	(Moldova) FC Sheriff Tiraspol	11.02	Signed a 1 year loan deal with Sheriff.	
(The Gambia) Bubacarr Tambedou	FW	21	(Moldova) FC Sheriff Tiraspol	Paide Linnameeskond	31.07	Loan deal with Sheriff terminated. Returned to Paide.	
(The Gambia) Foday Trawally	MF	21	Paide Linnameeskond	JK Tallinna Kalev	02.03	Signed a 1 year loan deal with Kalev.	
(Italy) Maximiliano Uggè	DF	31	Tallinna FCI Levadia	free agent	01.01	Contract with Levadia ended.	

=== Managerial changes ===
Listed are all clubs, who play in the top divisions (Meistriliiga, Esiliiga, Esiliiga B), and national teams who changed managers after the end of the 2022 season.

Name	Pos.	Age	From	To	Date	Notes	Ref
