= UEFA Under-19 Futsal Championship =

- Organiser(s): UEFA
- Founded: 2019
- Region: Europe
- Teams: Maximum of 55 (Qualifiers); 8 (Finals)
- Current champions: Portugal (2nd title)
- Most championships: Spain; Portugal (2 titles each)
- Website: uefa.com/futsalunder19
- 2025 UEFA Under-19 Futsal Championship

The UEFA European Under-19 Futsal Championship is the main futsal competition of the under-19 national futsal teams governed by UEFA (the Union of European Football Associations).

The tournament is held every two years, with the first final tournament held in September 2019 in Latvia and featuring eight teams.

== Winners ==
Year	Host	Final			Losing semi-finalists
Year	Host	Winner	Score	Runner-up	Losing semi-finalists
2019; Details	Riga, Latvia	Spain	6–1	Croatia	Poland and Portugal
2022; Details	Jaén, Spain	Spain	6–2 (a.e.t.)	Portugal	Poland and Ukraine
2023; Details	Poreč, Croatia	Portugal	6–2	Spain	Slovenia and Ukraine
2025; Details	Chișinău, Moldova	Portugal	3–2 (a.e.t.)	Spain	Slovenia and Ukraine
2027; Details	Astana, Kazakhstan				

== Statistics ==
=== Performances by countries ===
Team	Winners	Runners-up	Semi-finalists	Total (Top Four)
Spain	2 (2019, 2022)	2 (2023, 2025)		4
Portugal	2 (2023, 2025)	1 (2022)	1 (2019)	4
Croatia		1 (2019)		1
Ukraine			3 (2022, 2023, 2025)	3
Poland			2 (2019, 2022)	2
Slovenia			2 (2023, 2025)	2

=== Participating details ===
Teams	2019 (8)	2022 (8)	2023 (8)	2025 (8)	Total
Croatia	2nd	GS	GS	•	3
Czech Republic	•	•	•	GS	1
Finland	•	•	GS	•	1
France	•	GS	GS	•	2
Italy	•	GS	GS	GS	3
Latvia	GS	•	•	•	1
Moldova	•	•	•	GS	1
Netherlands	GS	•	•	•	1
Poland	SF	SF	•	•	2
Portugal	SF	2nd	1st	1st	4
Romania	•	GS	•	•	1
Russia	GS	×	×	×	1
Slovenia	•	•	SF	SF	2
Spain	1st	1st	2nd	2nd	4
Turkey	•	•	•	GS	1
Ukraine	GS	SF	SF	SF	4

Legend

- 1st – Champions
- 2nd – Runners-up
- SF – Semi-finalists
- QF – Quarter-finals
- GS – Group stage
- Q – Qualified for upcoming tournament
- — Hosts
- • – Did not qualify
- × – Did not enter
- × – Withdrew before qualification / Banned

== Debut of teams ==
Year	Debuting teams			Successor teams
Year	Teams	No.	CT	Successor teams
2019	Croatia, Latvia, Netherlands, Poland, Portugal, Russia, Spain, Ukraine	8	8	
2022	France, Italy, Romania	3	11	
2023	Finland, Slovenia	2	13	
2025	Czech Republic, Moldova, Turkey	3	16	

== See also ==
- UEFA Futsal Championship
- UEFA Futsal Under-21 Championship (defunct)
