= 2025 UEFA Under-19 Futsal Championship =

Campionatul UEFA de Futsal Sub-19 ani din 2025 (in Romanian)

Tournament details
- Host country: Moldova
- City: Chișinău
- Dates: 28 September – 5 October
- Teams: 8 (from 1 confederation)
- Venue: 1 (in 1 host city)

Final positions
- Champions: Portugal (2nd title)
- Runners-up: Spain

Tournament statistics
- Matches played: 15
- Goals scored: 90 (6 per match)
- Top scorer: (Portugal) Rodrigo Monteiro (7 goals)
- Best player: (Portugal) Rodrigo Monteiro

The 2025 UEFA Under-19 Futsal Championship (also known as UEFA Under-19 Futsal Euro 2025) was the fourth edition of the UEFA Under-19 Futsal Championship, the biennial international youth futsal championship organised by UEFA for the men's under-19 national teams of Europe. The tournament was hosted at the Chișinău Arena, Moldova from 28 September to 5 October 2025. A total of eight nations participated in the final tournament, with players born on or after 1 January 2006 being eligible to participate.

In a rematch of the 2022 and 2023 final, Portugal defeated Spain by 3–2 after extra time to successfully retain their title and secure their second title overall.

== Qualification ==
A total of 36 teams participated, with 35 competing for a spot alongside hosts Moldova in the finals. The 25 nations with the highest rankings, including Portugal, Spain, and 2023 semi-finalists Slovenia and Ukraine, entered directly into the main round between 25 and 30 March. The other ten teams competed in the preliminary round between 21 and 26 January 2025, aiming to secure the final three spots in the main round.

The qualifying draw was held on 31 October 2024.

Team	Qualified as	Qualified on	Previous appearances in Under-19 Futsal Euro^{1}
Moldova	Hosts	21 October 2024	0 (debut)
Italy	Main round Group 1 winners	30 March 2025	2 (2022, 2023)
Spain	Main round Group 2 winners	29 March 2025	3 (**2019**, **2022**, 2023)
Portugal	Main round Group 3 winners	30 March 2025	3 (2019, 2022, **2023**)
Slovenia	Main round Group 4 winners	29 March 2025	1 (2023)
Ukraine	Main round Group 5 winners	29 March 2025	3 (2019, 2022, 2023)
Czech Republic	Main round Group 6 winners	28 March 2025	0 (debut)
Turkey	Main round Group 7 winners	29 March 2025	0 (debut)

^{1} Bold indicates champions for that year. Italic indicates hosts for that year.

== Squads ==
Each national team submitted a squad of 14 players, two of whom had to be goalkeepers.

== Group stage ==
The group winners and runners-up advance to the semi-finals.

Tiebreakers

In the group stage, teams are ranked according to points (3 points for a win, 1 point for a draw, 0 points for a loss), and if tied on points, the following tiebreaking criteria are applied, in the order given, to determine the rankings (Regulations Articles 18.01 and 18.02):

1. Points in head-to-head matches among tied teams;
2. Goal difference in head-to-head matches among tied teams;
3. Goals scored in head-to-head matches among tied teams;
4. If more than two teams are tied, and after applying all head-to-head criteria above, a subset of teams are still tied, all head-to-head criteria above are reapplied exclusively to this subset of teams;
5. Goal difference in all group matches;
6. Goals scored in all group matches;
7. Penalty shoot-out if only two teams have the same number of points, and they met in the last round of the group and are tied after applying all criteria above (not used if more than two teams have the same number of points, or if their rankings are not relevant for qualification for the next stage);
8. Disciplinary points (red card = 3 points, yellow card = 1 point, expulsion for two yellow cards in one match = 3 points);
9. UEFA coefficient for the qualifying round draw;
10. Drawing of lots.

=== Group A ===
Pos	Team	Pld	W	D	L	GF	GA	GD	Pts	Qualification
1	Portugal	3	3	0	0	21	1	+20	9	Knockout stage
2	Ukraine	3	2	0	1	9	4	+5	6	Knockout stage
3	Italy	3	1	0	2	8	11	−3	3	
4	Moldova (H)	3	0	0	3	2	24	−22	0	

Source: UEFA
Rules for classification: Group stage tiebreakers
(H) Hosts
28 September 2025
12:00

Moldova	0–7	Ukraine
	Report	Kamets 2:02; Klimchuk 4:46; Tsap 6:19; Pershyn 8:36, 12:18; Malynovskyi 28:17; Rostkivskyi 35:31

Chișinău Arena, Chișinău
Referee: Diego Martinez Garcia (Spain), Aleš Mocnik Peric (Slovenia)
28 September 2025
19:30

Portugal	7–1	Italy
Baldé 1:08; Sousa 16:10, 25:09; Renato Almeida 27:23; Monteiro 30:39; Mourinha 35:17, 35:40	Report	Alves Rodrigues 7:56

Chișinău Arena, Chișinău
Referee: Grigori Ošomkov (Estonia), Dino Kramar (Croatia)

29 September 2025
17:00

Italy	7–2	Moldova
Moratelli 1:47, 7:01; Belfassi 19:06; M. Musumeci 25:33; Cutruneo 29:40; Grosso 32:10; Centorrino 38:14	Report	N. Bejenaru 29:31; V. Bejenaru 31:01

Chișinău Arena, Chișinău
Referee: Radim Cep (Czechia), Hakan Tezcan (Türkiye)
29 September 2025
19:30

Ukraine	0–4	Portugal
	Report	Monteiro 3:34, 22:39, 35:03; Malhão 19:58

Chișinău Arena, Chișinău
Referee: Maximilian Alkofer (Germany), Done Ristovski (North Macedonia)

1 October 2025
17:30

Moldova	0–10	Portugal
	Report	Afonso Mourinha 2:01 (pen.); Tomás Nogueira 3:10, 29:31; Rodrigo Monteiro 3:36, 19:07, 28:09; António Pereira 25:31; Martim Castela 25:49, 34:42; Eduardo Tchuda 37:59

Chișinău Arena, Chișinău
Referee: Daniele D'adamo (San Marino), Bogdan Hanceariuc (Romania)
1 October 2025
19:30

Italy	0−2	Ukraine
	Report	Shpak 27:48; Pershyn 38:55

Chișinău Arena, Chișinău
Referee: Dino Kramar (Croatia), Diego Martinez Garcia (Spain)

=== Group B ===
Pos	Team	Pld	W	D	L	GF	GA	GD	Pts	Qualification
1	Spain	3	3	0	0	12	4	+8	9	Knockout stage
2	Slovenia	3	2	0	1	8	8	0	6	Knockout stage
3	Czech Republic	3	1	0	2	7	8	−1	3	
4	Turkey	3	0	0	3	4	11	−7	0	

Source: UEFA
Rules for classification: Group stage tiebreakers
28 September 2025
14:30

Slovenia	2–1	Czech Republic
Mi. Čop 34:17; Avdić 38:37	Report	Hromek 15:35

Chișinău Arena, Chișinău
Referee: Bogdan Hanceariuc (Romania), Daniele D'adamo (San Marino)
28 September 2025
17:00

Spain	3–0	Turkey
Lahoz 03:14; Martínez 23:04; Guti 31:57	Report

Chișinău Arena, Chișinău
Referee: Viktor Bugenko (Moldova), Dominykas Norkus (Lithuania)

29 September 2025
12:00

Turkey	1–4	Slovenia
Ege Bilim 32:59	Report	Prah 15:05; Mi. Čop 23:13, 39:43; Trdin 30:54

Chișinău Arena, Chișinău
Referee: Annamaria Tolnay (Hungary), Arttu Kyynaeraeinen (Finland)
29 September 2025
14:30

Czech Republic	2–3	Spain
Hromek 25:55; Bíško 39:33	Report	Pablo Guti 6:23; Nacho Olivares 9:44, 34:10

Chișinău Arena, Chișinău
Referee: Giovanni Zannola (Italy), Pedro Gonçalo Paixão Costa (Portugal)

1 October 2025
12:00

Turkey	3–4	Czech Republic
Emin Doğan 1:46; Cebrail Koç 19:42; Ahmet Köksal 20:38	Report	Rešetár 16:37; Bíško 18:26, 26:30; Kuta 33:40

Chișinău Arena, Chișinău
Referee: Pedro Gonçalo Paixão Costa (Portugal), Maximilian Alkofer (Germany)
1 October 2025
14:30

Slovenia	2–6	Spain
Kokol 34:09; Sevenšek 39:52	Report	Pablo Guti 6:23, 6:55; Ruano 8:06, 27:28, 28:42; González 10:59

Chișinău Arena, Chișinău
Referee: Dominykas Norkus (Lithuania), Giovanni Zannola (Italy)

== Knockout stage ==
In the knockout stage, extra time and penalty shoot-out are used to decide the winner if necessary.

=== Bracket ===
Semi-finals
3 October – Chișinău
Portugal	3
Slovenia	0
3 October – Chișinău
Spain	7
Ukraine	4

Final
5 October – Chișinău
Portugal (a.e.t.)	3
Spain	2

=== Semi-finals ===
3 October 2025
17:00

Portugal	3–0	Slovenia
Tiago Rodrigues 1:49; Miguel Malhão 27:22; Eurico Cunha 38:49	Report

Chișinău Arena, Chișinău
Referee: Dino Kramar (Croatia), Done Ristovski (North Macedonia)

3 October 2025
19:30

Spain	7–4	Ukraine
Pedro Altaba 2:52; Roger Garcia 14:19; Lahoz 15:30; Pablo Guti 23:21; Nacho Olivares 28:15; Unai Izquierdo 33:22; Shpak 35:38 (o.g.)	Report	Tsap 8:24; Klimchuk 13:49; Shpak 31:56; Pedro Altaba 38:55 (o.g.)

Chișinău Arena, Chișinău
Referee: Dominykas Norkus (Lithuania), Arttu Kyynaeraeinen (Finland)

=== Final ===
5 October 2025
19:30

Portugal	3–2 (a.e.t.)	Spain
Simão Cordeiro 30:53; Tiago Rodrigues 38:06; Eduardo Tchuda 49:46	Report	Ruano 14:21; Nacho Olivares 29:19

Chișinău Arena, Chișinău
Referee: Viktor Bugenko (Moldova), Grigori Ošomkov (Estonia)
