= Chișinău Arena =

Indoor sporting arena in Chișinău, Moldova

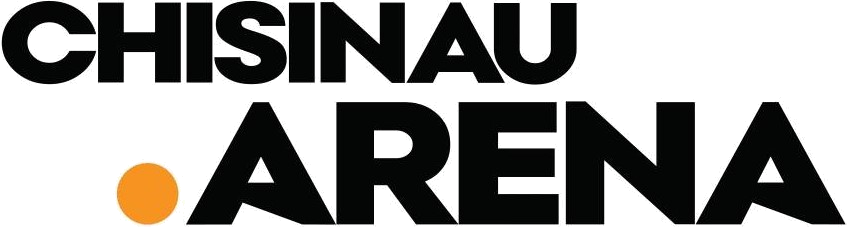

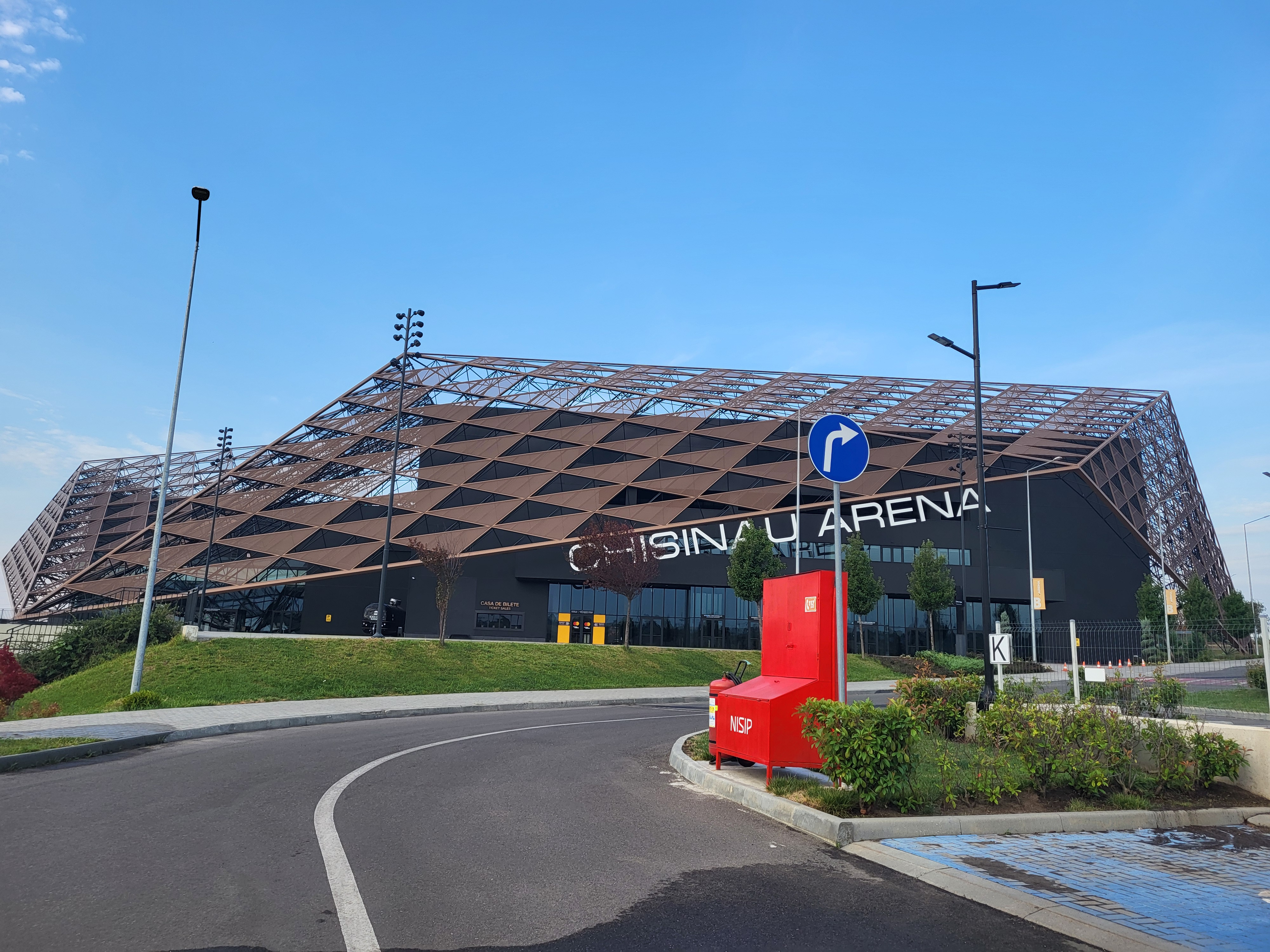
- The arena in 2024
- Interactive map of Chișinău Arena
- Address: 130 Calea Orheiului Street; Stăuceni, Chișinău; Moldova
- Coordinates: 47.0717°N 28.8617°E
- Capacity: Concerts: 5,000

Construction
- Groundbreaking: October 2018
- Built: 2018–2020
- Opened: 24 December 2022
- Architect: Yazgan Design Architecture
- Main contractor: Summa

Website
- arenachisinau.md

The Chișinău Arena (Romanian: Arena Chișinău) is an indoor sporting arena located in Stăuceni, Chișinău, Moldova. The facility has a seating capacity of up to 5,000 for concerts and features various amenities, including an aquatic centre, ice rink, sports courts and conference rooms.

== History ==
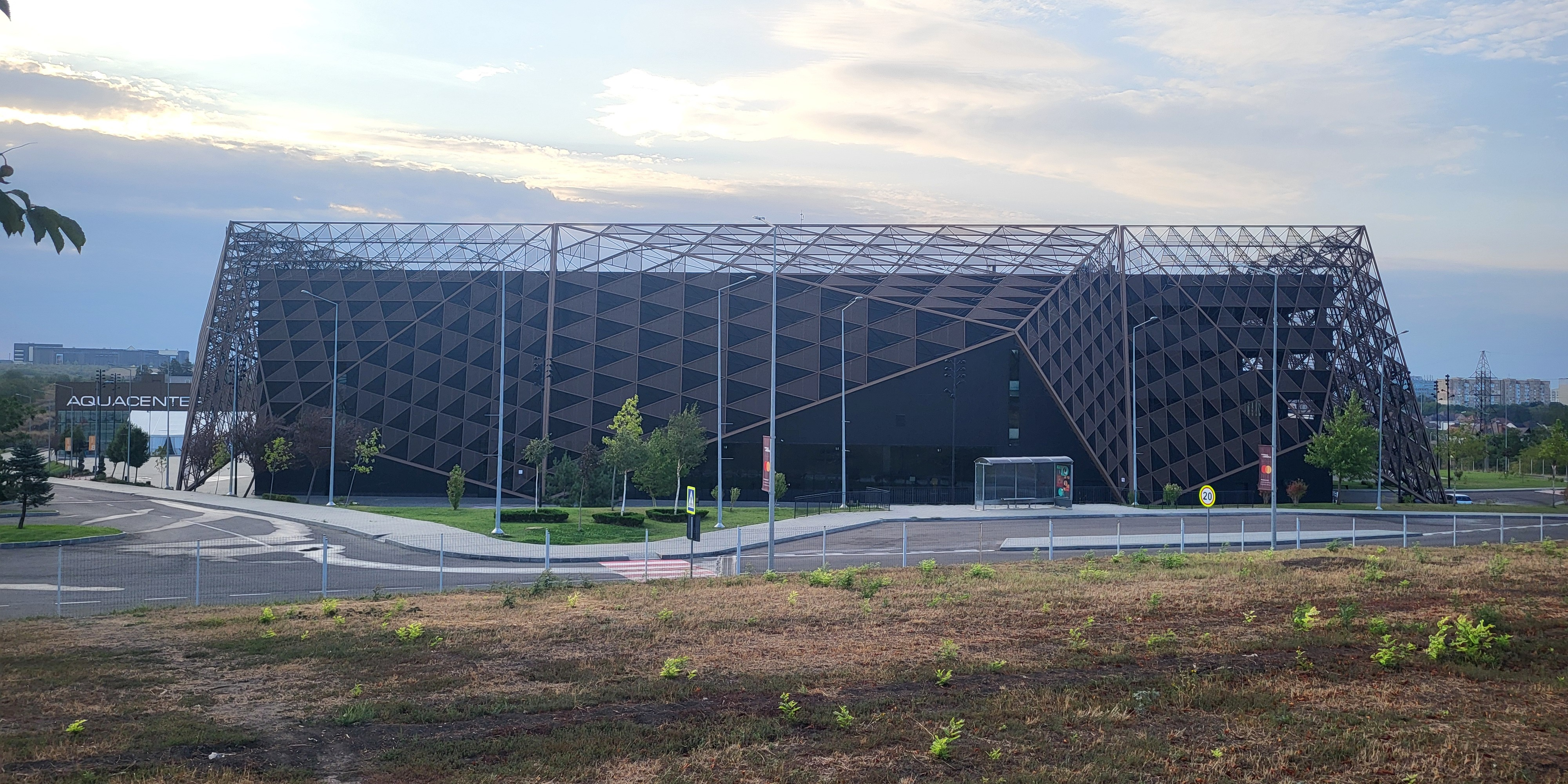
Street view of the arena (2024)

The concept of Chișinău Arena was initiated in 2018 as part of a government-led effort to enhance Moldova's sports and entertainment infrastructure. The project aimed to establish a modern, multipurpose facility capable of hosting a wide range of events, from sports competitions to concerts and conferences. Construction of the arena began in October 2018, with the Turkish company Summa overseeing the fast-tracked project. The construction was completed in 2020, but the opening was delayed due to COVID-19 pandemic.

Ukrainian band Okean Elzy announced they would perform at the grand opening of Chișinău Arena on 24 December 2022.

== Entertainment ==
The venue has hosted concerts by various artists including Valery Meladze, Zemfira, Okean Elzy, Bi-2, B.U.G. Mafia, Splean, 3rei Sud Est, Vanya Dmitrienko and Alternosfera.

On 17 January 2026, Chișinău Arena hosted the Moldovan national selection for the Eurovision Song Contest 2026.

== Sports ==
The 2025 European Weightlifting Championships were held at Chișinău Arena from 13 to 21 April 2025, as well as the 2025 UEFA Under-19 Futsal Championship from 28 September to 5 October 2025.

== Criticism ==
Chișinău Arena has faced criticism primarily related to its cost and the prioritization of resources. Critics argue that the substantial investment required for the construction could have been allocated to other pressing needs in Moldova, such as healthcare, education, or infrastructure in less developed areas. Additionally, concerns were raised about the speed at which the project was completed, with some questioning whether the quality of construction might have been compromised in the rush to meet deadlines. There have also been doubts about the long-term financial sustainability of the arena, particularly regarding its maintenance costs and the ability to consistently attract enough events to justify the investment.
