= Eva-Maria Niit =

Estonian footballer

Personal information
- Date of birth: 5 February 2002 (age 24)
- Place of birth: Tartu, Estonia
- Position: Defender

Senior career*
Years	Team	Apps	(Gls)
2017–2023	Tartu JK Tammeka		
2024	Medyk Konin	6	(0)
2024–2025	KRC Genk		
2025-	Flora	14	(1)

International career^{‡}
2020–	Estonia	14	(0)
- * Club domestic league appearances and goals as of 19 April 2026 ‡ National team caps and goals as of 1 October 2025

Eva-Maria Niit (born 5 February 2002) is an Estonian footballer who plays as a defender for the Estonia women's national team.

== Career ==
She made her debut for the Estonia national team on 23 February 2021 against Slovenia, coming on as a substitute for Pille Raadik.
