= 2023 UEFA Under-19 Futsal Championship qualification =

Tournament details
- Dates: 18 January – 26 March 2023
- Teams: 35 (from 1 confederation)

Tournament statistics
- Matches played: 54
- Goals scored: 349 (6.46 per match)
- Top scorer(s): (Kosovo) Blend Krasniqi (10 goals)
- All statistics correct as of 26 March 2023.

The 2023 UEFA Under-19 Futsal Championship qualifying competition will be a men's under-19 futsal competition to determine the seven teams joining the automatically qualified hosts Croatia in the 2023 UEFA Under-19 Futsal Championship final tournament. Players born on or after 1 January 2004 are eligible to participate.

== Teams ==
Apart from Croatia, a total of 35 (out of 54) UEFA member national teams entered the qualifying stage. They are seeded on the basis of the associations' results in the 2018/19 and 2021/22 competitions.

The 25 highest-ranked teams entered the main round, while the 10 lowest-ranked teams entered the preliminary round. The coefficient ranking was also used for seeding in the preliminary round and main round draws, where each team was assigned a seeding position according to their ranking for the respective draw.

Teams entering Preliminary Round

Pot 1 (Hosts)
Team	Coeff	Rank	Position
North Macedonia	1.500	28	1
Lithuania	0.333	31	2
Gibraltar	0.000	33	3 & 4

Pot 2 (seeding position 4 or 3)
Team	Coeff	Rank
Estonia	0.000	32
Germany	0.000	34
Malta	0.000	35

Pot 3 (seeding position 2)
Team	Coeff	Rank
San Marino	0.333	29
Kosovo	0.333	30

Pot 4 (seeding position 1)
Team	Coeff	Rank
Montenegro	1.967	26
England	1.667	27

Teams entering Main Round

Pot 1 (Hosts)
Team	Coeff	Rank	Position
Portugal	11.000	2	1
Latvia	4.000	15	3
Serbia	3.667	17	3
Moldova	2.667	21	3

Pot 2 (seeding position 4)
Team	Coeff	Rank
Andorra	2.500	22
Kazakhstan	2.000	23
Georgia	2.000	24
Azerbaijan	2.000	25
Winners preliminary round Group A
Winners preliminary round Group B
Winners preliminary round Group C

Pot 3 (seeding position 3)
Team	Coeff	Rank
Czech Republic	4.000	16
Greece	3.083	18
Belarus	3.000	19
Hungary	2.667	20

Pot 4 (seeding position 2)
Team	Coeff	Rank
Romania	4.467	8
Netherlands	4.333	9
Bosnia and Herzegovina	4.333	10
Turkey	4.333	11
Slovenia	4.333	12
Slovakia	4.333	13
Finland	4.000	14

Pot 5 (seeding position 1)
Team	Coeff	Rank
Spain	13.667	1
Poland	9.000	3
Ukraine	8.167	4
France	5.167	5
Italy	5.000	6
Belgium	4.667	7

== Format ==
In the preliminary round and main round, each group is played as a round-robin mini-tournament at the pre-selected hosts.

=== Tiebreakers ===
In the preliminary round and main round, teams are ranked according to points (3 points for a win, 1 point for a draw, 0 points for a loss), and if tied on points, the following tiebreaking criteria are applied, in the order given, to determine the rankings (Regulations Articles 14.01 and 14.02):

1. Points in head-to-head matches among tied teams;
2. Goal difference in head-to-head matches among tied teams;
3. Goals scored in head-to-head matches among tied teams;
4. If more than two teams are tied, and after applying all head-to-head criteria above, a subset of teams are still tied, all head-to-head criteria above are reapplied exclusively to this subset of teams;
5. Goal difference in all group matches;
6. Goals scored in all group matches;
7. Penalty shoot-out if only two teams have the same number of points, and they met in the last round of the group and are tied after applying all criteria above (not used if more than two teams have the same number of points, or if their rankings are not relevant for qualification for the next stage);
8. Disciplinary points (red card = 3 points, yellow card = 1 point, expulsion for two yellow cards in one match = 3 points);
9. UEFA coefficient for the qualifying round draw;

== Preliminary round ==
The winners of each group advance to main round to join the 27 teams which receive byes to main round.

Times are CET (UTC+1), as listed by UEFA (local times, if different, are in parentheses).

=== Group A ===
Pos	Team	Pld	W	D	L	GF	GA	GD	Pts	Qualification
1	England	3	3	0	0	14	4	+10	9	Main round
2	Malta	3	1	1	1	6	11	−5	4	
3	Lithuania (H)	3	0	2	1	3	6	−3	2	
4	Estonia	3	0	1	2	8	10	−2	1	

Source: UEFA
Rules for classification: Qualifying tiebreakers
(H) Hosts
18 January 2023
15:30 (16:30 EET)

England	6–0	Malta
Young 5:19; Nathan 8:01; Brooker 21:14, 23:47; Kaye 21:30; Desborough 30:57 (pen.)	Report

LSC Hall, Druskininkai
Referee: Turekhan Tursumbayev (Kazakhstan), Bogdan Hanceariuc (Romania)
18 January 2023
18:30 (19:30 EET)

Estonia	1–1	Lithuania
Bažkov 9:47	Report	Siaurusevičius 33:14

LSC Hall, Druskininkai
Referee: Drazen Vukcevic (Montenegro), Martin Køster (Denmark)

19 January 2023
15:30 (19:30 EET)

Estonia	4–5	England
Bažkov 1:00, 17:54; Raužin 7:21; Agaptšev 39:32	Report	Kaye 1:19; Sikirwayi 3:47; Desborough 15:49; Badham 28:30; Devine 29:58

LSC Hall, Druskininkai
Referee: Bogdan Hanceariuc (Romania), Drazen Vukcevic (Montenegro)
19 January 2023
18:30 (19:30 EET)

Lithuania	2–2	Malta
Balasanov 4:18; Siaurusevičius 33:44	Report	Agius 0:42; Gatt 12:44

LSC Hall, Druskininkai
Referee: Martin Køster (Denmark), Turekhan Tursumbayev (Kazakhstan)

21 January 2023
15:30 (19:30 EET)

Malta	4–3	Estonia
Gatt 18:03; Sammut 21:00, 22:28; Agius 23:55	Report	Bažkov 4:30, 13:58; Männi 36:48

LSC Hall, Druskininkai
Referee: Bogdan Hanceariuc (Romania), Martin Køster (Denmark)
21 January 2023
18:30 (19:30 EET)

Lithuania	0–3	England
	Report	Brooker 4:30, 35:33; Devine 8:38

LSC Hall, Druskininkai
Referee: Drazen Vukcevic (Montenegro), Turekhan Tursumbayev (Kazakhstan)

=== Group B ===
Pos	Team	Pld	W	D	L	GF	GA	GD	Pts	Qualification
1	Montenegro	2	2	0	0	8	6	+2	6	Main round
2	Gibraltar (H)	2	1	0	1	10	6	+4	3	
3	San Marino	2	0	0	2	1	7	−6	0	

Source: UEFA
Rules for classification: Qualifying tiebreakers
(H) Hosts
19 January 2023
19:00

San Marino	0–5	Gibraltar
	Report	Glynn 1:26; Coltan 10:43; Perera 16:23; Caetano 25:03; Zammitt 29:03

Tercentenary Sports Hall, Gibraltar
Attendance: 316
Referee: Jiri Bergs (Belgium), Paavo Komppa (Finland)

20 January 2023
19:00

Montenegro	2–1	San Marino
Roćenović 18:10; Gopčević 33:01	Report	Bacciocchi 10:24

Tercentenary Sports Hall, Gibraltar
Attendance: 55
Referee: Paavo Komppa (Finland), Jagnar Jakobson (Estonia)

21 January 2023
19:00

Gibraltar	5–6	Montenegro
Rodriquez 5:12; Perera 6:55, 18:31; Glynn 36:53; Zammitt 39:14	Report	Mijušković 4:15, 20:20; Roćenović 12:09, 21:54; Ćetković 18:01, 31:32

Tercentenary Sports Hall, Gibraltar
Attendance: 395
Referee: Jagnar Jakobson (Estonia), Jiri Bergs (Belgium)

=== Group C ===
Pos	Team	Pld	W	D	L	GF	GA	GD	Pts	Qualification
1	Kosovo	2	1	1	0	9	6	+3	4	Main round
2	Germany	2	0	2	0	6	6	0	2	
3	North Macedonia (H)	2	0	1	1	6	9	−3	1	

Source: UEFA
Rules for classification: Qualifying tiebreakers
(H) Hosts
19 January 2023
17:00

Germany	3–3	North Macedonia
Schrade 0:17; Kavurmacioglu 1:18; Assiongbor 29:12	Report	Anchevski 2:28, 20:09; Rusevski 2:46

SC Jane Sandanski small hall, Skopje
Referee: Zviad Bliadze (Georgia), Filip Nesnera (Czech Republic)

20 January 2023
17:00

Kosovo	3–3	Germany
Mehmeti 8:52; Krasniqi 12:09, 21:23	Report	Suton 20:25, 26:47; Schrade 26:01

SC Jane Sandanski small hall, Skopje
Referee: Filip Nesnera (Czech Republic), Valentin Ciuplea (Wales)

21 January 2023
17:00

North Macedonia	3–6	Kosovo
Jusuf 8:22; Skeoarovski 17:34; Janev 33:45 (pen.)	Report	Kabashi 20:42, 36:58; Krasniqi 28:57, 30:20; Abdullahu 31:47; Bajraktari 39:26

SC Jane Sandanski small hall, Skopje
Referee: Valentin Ciuplea (Wales), Zviad Bliadze (Georgia)

== Main round ==
The winners of each group advance to the final tournament.

Times are CET/CEST, (Note: CET (UTC+1) for dates up to 26 March 2023, and CEST (UTC+2) for dates thereafter.) as listed by UEFA (local times, if different, are in parentheses).

=== Group 1 ===
Pos	Team	Pld	W	D	L	GF	GA	GD	Pts	Qualification
1	Slovenia	3	2	1	0	17	1	+16	7 (Note: Overall goal difference: Slovenia +16, Poland +8.)	Final tournament
2	Poland	3	2	1	0	12	4	+8	7	
3	Kazakhstan	3	1	0	2	7	10	−3	3	
4	Moldova (H)	3	0	0	3	3	24	−21	0	

Source: UEFA
Rules for classification: Qualifying tiebreakers
(H) Hosts
Notes:
22 March 2023
14:00

Slovenia	11–0	Moldova
Čop 0:32, 20:20; Ruis 0:51, 24:34; Skrinjar 8:07; Grm 15:16, 26:11; Žlindra 25:41; Gregorič 34:49 (pen.), 37:33; Kos 36:29	Report

FMF Futsal Arena, Ciorescu
Referee: Volha Pauliuts (Belarus)
22 March 2023
17:00

Poland	3–2	Kazakhstan
Licznerski 0:47, 1:32; Dmochiewicz 28:47	Report	Kairbay 15:07; Deryabin 32:59

FMF Futsal Arena, Ciorescu
Referee: Daniel Matkovic (Switzerland)

23 March 2023
14:00

Slovenia	1–1	Poland
Ruis 38:00	Report	Dmochiewicz 4:26

FMF Futsal Arena, Ciorescu
Referee: Dario Pezzuto (Italy)
23 March 2023
17:00

Moldova	2–5	Kazakhstan
Cucoș 7:14; Danilov 28:18	Report	Kenzhegali 8:15, 27:54; Deryabin 11:57; Marakhov 17:34; Kairbay 20:56

FMF Futsal Arena, Ciorescu
Referee: Idan Berenshtein (Israel)

25 March 2023
14:00

Kazakhstan	0–5	Slovenia
	Report	Ruis 6:33, 21:43, 33:19; Skrinjar 28:01, 33:32

FMF Futsal Arena, Ciorescu
Referee: Daniel Matkovic (Switzerland), Dario Pezzuto (Italy)
25 March 2023
17:00

Moldova	1–8	Poland
Stepuleac 19:49	Report	Betowski 1:46; Licznerski 4:06, 20:53, 23:21; Stropșa 8:56 (o.g.); Górski 20:09; Klatkiewicz 30:54; Krzempek 39:23

FMF Futsal Arena, Ciorescu

=== Group 2 ===
Pos	Team	Pld	W	D	L	GF	GA	GD	Pts	Qualification
1	Ukraine	3	3	0	0	23	6	+17	9	Final tournament
2	Serbia (H)	3	2	0	1	11	6	+5	6	
3	Romania	3	1	0	2	11	15	−4	3	
4	Montenegro	3	0	0	3	4	22	−18	0	

Source: UEFA
Rules for classification: Qualifying tiebreakers
(H) Hosts
22 March 2023
16:00

Romania	1–6	Serbia
Cordos 34:06	Report	Rakić 1:53; Đukić 4:38; Pajković 12:06, 13:31; Kostić 31:54; Marojević 37:27

Sports Hall "VLADE DIVAC", Vrnjacka Banja
Referee: Chiara Perona (Italy)
22 March 2023
19:00

Ukraine	12–1	Montenegro
Sužnjević 3:40 (o.g.), 34:50 (o.g.); Skybchyk 4:32; Malynovskyi 9:41, 10:48; Yelishev 15:30, 16:24; Ćetković 18:57 (o.g.); Peletskiy 21:49, 26:12; Tkachenko 27:04, 28:01	Report	Gopčević 5:25

Sports Hall "VLADE DIVAC", Vrnjacka Banja
Referee: Javier Moreno Reina (Spain)

23 March 2023
16:00

Serbia	3–1	Montenegro
Doknic 2:27 (o.g.); Stojanović 3:22, 24:31	Report	Ćetković 39:44

Sports Hall "VLADE DIVAC", Vrnjacka Banja
Referee: Hikmat Qafarli (Azerbaijan)
23 March 2023
19:00

Romania	3–7	Ukraine
Peter 9:41; Cireș 33:10, 37:53	Report	Rybitskyi 5:51; Snitsarenko 7:25, 14:07; Tiutiurai 19:38; Tkachenko 23:07; Malynovskyi 27:12; Bielimov 33:37

Sports Hall "VLADE DIVAC", Vrnjacka Banja
Referee: Ingus Puriņš (Latvia)

25 March 2023
16:00

Montenegro	2–7	Romania
Nikolić 27:18; Doknic 36:29	Report	Varga 9:47; Chertes 19:04, 39:18, 39:51; Peter 19:19; Strugariu 30:19; Popovics 34:02

Sports Hall "VLADE DIVAC", Vrnjacka Banja
Referee: Hikmat Qafarli (Azerbaijan), Ingus Puriņš (Latvia)
25 March 2023
19:00

Serbia	2–4	Ukraine
Đukić 30:32; Jeremić 39:39	Report	Tiutiurai 0:15; Skybchyk 9:41, 17:01; Malynovskyi 39:47

Sports Hall "VLADE DIVAC", Vrnjacka Banja

=== Group 3 ===
Pos	Team	Pld	W	D	L	GF	GA	GD	Pts	Qualification
1	Portugal (H)	3	3	0	0	25	4	+21	9	Final tournament
2	Belarus	3	2	0	1	12	15	−3	6	
3	Kosovo	3	1	0	2	14	15	−1	3	
4	Slovakia	3	0	0	3	4	21	−17	0	

Source: UEFA
Rules for classification: Qualifying tiebreakers
(H) Hosts
23 March 2023
16:00

Slovakia	1–7	Kosovo
Bielik 3:31	Report	Horváth 21:43 (o.g.); Krasniqi 21:57, 29:30, 38:12; Kabashi 24:41; Abdullahu 33:01; Demaj 39:47

Pavilhão Multiusos de Fafe, Fafe
Referee: Telmen Undrakh (Norway)
23 March 2023
19:00

Belarus	0–9	Portugal
	Report	Macedo 2:15, 8:55, 14:34; Silva 5:06, 5:36; Marques 18:09, 26:50, 39:48; Rocha 22:22

Pavilhão Multiusos de Fafe, Fafe
Referee: Aleš Mocnik Peric (Slovenia)

24 March 2023
16:00

Belarus	5–3	Slovakia
Barkun 9:34; Astafyeu 15:59, 33:02, 38:27; Schasny 24:37	Report	Strapek 13:35; Hazda 14:03; Nemček 38:49

Pavilhão Multiusos de Fafe, Fafe
Referee: Trayan Enchev (Bulgaria)
24 March 2023
20:00

Portugal	7–4	Kosovo
Correia 15:05; Dzyalochynskyy 15:24; Santos 18:18, 26:14; Silva 19:19; Tomás Colaço 19:50; Macedo 35:38	Report	Krasniqi 4:46, 22:14; Demaj 30:33; Maliqi 33:20

Pavilhão Multiusos de Fafe, Fafe
Referee: Valentin Ciuplea (Wales)

26 March 2023
14:00

Kosovo	3–7	Belarus
Khvesko 2:54 (o.g.); J. Krasniqi 39:00; B. Krasniqi 39:07	Report	Barkun 5:49; Demaj 18:51 (o.g.); Astafyeu 18:55, 20:45, 23:41; Schasny 32:50; Karpuk 38:46

Pavilhão Multiusos de Fafe, Fafe
Referee: Aleš Mocnik Peric (Slovenia), Telmen Undrakh (Norway)
26 March 2023
18:00

Portugal	9–0	Slovakia
Rocha 2:26; Silva 3:18, 25:29, 38:20; Bruno Maior 12:52, 21:04; Santos 18:28, 38:38; Dzyalochynskyy 32:24	Report

Pavilhão Multiusos de Fafe, Fafe
Referee: Trayan Enchev (Bulgaria), Valentin Ciuplea (Wales)

=== Group 4 ===
Pos	Team	Pld	W	D	L	GF	GA	GD	Pts	Qualification
1	Finland	3	2	1	0	11	5	+6	7	Final tournament
2	Belgium	3	2	0	1	6	3	+3	6	
3	Latvia (H)	3	1	1	1	7	5	+2	4	
4	Georgia	3	0	0	3	4	15	−11	0	

Source: UEFA
Rules for classification: Qualifying tiebreakers
(H) Hosts
22 March 2023
15:00

Belgium	4–2	Georgia
Salah 3:35; Peirsman 7:14; Van Cauter 35:07; Aabdi 37:32	Report	Iashvili 10:29; Peirsman 14:31 (o.g.)

Zemgales Olympic Centre, Jelgava
Referee: Viktor Bugenko (Moldova)
22 March 2023
18:00

Finland	3–3	Latvia
Taipale 2:40; Paappanen 6:17; Niemelä 6:47	Report	Piļipčuks 23:14; Ošis 27:19; Fogels 32:00

Zemgales Olympic Centre, Jelgava
Referee: Victor Chaix (France)

23 March 2023
15:00

Finland	1–0	Belgium
Paappanen 7:04	Report

Zemgales Olympic Centre, Jelgava
Referee: Vasilios Christodoulis (Greece)
23 March 2023
18:00

Latvia	4–0	Georgia
Ošis 9:35; Piļipčuks 15:57; Fogels 17:05; Elbakidze 18:00 (o.g.)	Report

Zemgales Olympic Centre, Jelgava
Referee: Gevorg Yeghoyan (Armenia)

25 March 2023
13:00

Georgia	2–7	Finland
Iashvili 16:41; Songulashvili 37:36	Report	Mäntylä 2:38; Sylla 12:50, 23:15; Tuominen 19:35, 30:37, 33:50; Niemelä 38:20

Zemgales Olympic Centre, Jelgava
Referee: Vasilios Christodoulis (Greece), Victor Chaix (France)
25 March 2023
16:00

Latvia	0–2	Belgium
	Report	Salah 25:57; Suet 35:40

Zemgales Olympic Centre, Jelgava
Referee: Gevorg Yeghoyan (Armenia), Viktor Bugenko (Moldova)

=== Group 5 ===
Pos	Team	Pld	W	D	L	GF	GA	GD	Pts	Qualification
1	France	3	3	0	0	18	4	+14	9	Final tournament
2	Bosnia and Herzegovina (H)	3	2	0	1	10	7	+3	6	
3	Greece	3	1	0	2	13	14	−1	3	
4	Azerbaijan	3	0	0	3	4	20	−16	0	

Source: UEFA
Rules for classification: Qualifying tiebreakers
(H) Hosts
22 March 2023
17:00

France	5–0	Azerbaijan
Kouyate 5:59, 24:09; Belaib Lemoyne 7:02, 38:20; Doucoure 31:57	Report

Sports Hall Pecara, Široki Brijeg
Referee: Peter Nurse (England)
22 March 2023
20:00

Greece	1–3	Bosnia and Herzegovina
Grigorakos 5:29	Report	Krezo 2:02; Kadić 30:04; Čatić 39:58

Sports Hall Pecara, Široki Brijeg
Referee: Nicola Manzione (Italy)

23 March 2023
17:00

Greece	1–8	France
Tselios 9:30	Report	Bulbul 2:33; Kouyate 3:17, 23:46, 39:26; Rezzoug 14:14; Bugnet 16:08, 25:33; Erraddaf 18:24

Sports Hall Pecara, Široki Brijeg
Referee: Norbert Szilágyi (Hungary)
23 March 2023
20:00

Bosnia and Herzegovina	4–1	Azerbaijan
Ristić 12:45; Kolobarić 19:08; Čatić 30:20; Kadić 38:15	Report	Handamli 37:36

Sports Hall Pecara, Široki Brijeg
Referee: Martin Køster (Denmark)

25 March 2023
17:00

Azerbaijan	3–11	Greece
Mammadli 26:08; Abbasov 29:23; Handamli 39:55	Report	Grigorakos 3:17, 12:52; Kountardas 6:42, 27:48; Pavlidis 6:58; Papadopoulos 14:30; Tselios 17:16, 23:25, 27:33; Adamopoulos 19:41; Georgogiannis 21:47

Sports Hall Pecara, Široki Brijeg
25 March 2023
20:00

Bosnia and Herzegovina	3–5	France
Kolobarić 4:37; Ah. Kadić 14:38; Al. Kadić 15:46	Report	Kolobarić 8:08 (o.g.); Erraddaf 13:13; Kolski 18:13; Kouyate 27:20; Asname 39:29

Sports Hall Pecara, Široki Brijeg

=== Group 6 ===
Pos	Team	Pld	W	D	L	GF	GA	GD	Pts	Qualification
1	Spain	3	2	1	0	12	2	+10	7 (Note: Overall goal difference: Spain +10, Hungary +6.)	Final tournament
2	Hungary	3	2	1	0	8	2	+6	7	
3	Netherlands (H)	3	1	0	2	7	9	−2	3	
4	Andorra	3	0	0	3	1	15	−14	0	

Source: UEFA
Rules for classification: Qualifying tiebreakers
(H) Hosts
Notes:
22 March 2023
15:30

Spain	5–0	Andorra
Martínez Marín 7:24; Tapias 24:58; Cerdá Planas 29:58; Santa Cruz Vasallo 30:50; Tesorero Borrell 36:14 (o.g.)	Report

Topsportcentrum IISPA, Almelo
Referee: Kirill Naishouler (Finland)
22 March 2023
19:00

Hungary	2–1	Netherlands
Bartha 18:50; Oldenburg 39:32 (o.g.)	Report	Essanoussi 34:04

Topsportcentrum IISPA, Almelo
Referee: Miguel Castilho (Portugal)

23 March 2023
17:30

Hungary	1–1	Spain
Cerdá Planas 8:09 (o.g.)	Report	Santa Cruz Vasallo 38:15

Topsportcentrum IISPA, Almelo
Referee: Zviad Bliadze (Georgia)
23 March 2023
21:00

Netherlands	5–1	Andorra
Cosijn 3:40, 22:54; Afouzar 11:19; Faber 14:05; El Klai 33:38	Report	Alves Monteiro 38:12

Topsportcentrum IISPA, Almelo
Referee: Yiangos Yiangou (Cyprus)

25 March 2023
17:30

Andorra	0–5	Hungary
	Report	Kovács 2:02, 2:36; Kiss 6:57; Szabó 16:09; Knizs 32:38

Topsportcentrum IISPA, Almelo
25 March 2023
21:00

Netherlands	1–6	Spain
Essanoussi 0:51	Report	Ramos Mora 7:28; Salas Vidal 11:42; Santa Cruz Vasallo 13:32, 26:04; Cano Gil 28:42; Tapias 34:20 (pen.)

Topsportcentrum IISPA, Almelo

=== Group 7 ===
Pos	Team	Pld	W	D	L	GF	GA	GD	Pts	Qualification
1	Italy (H)	3	2	1	0	9	4	+5	7	Final tournament
2	Czech Republic	3	2	0	1	8	8	0	6	
3	Turkey	3	1	0	2	10	10	0	3	
4	England	3	0	1	2	7	12	−5	1	

Source: UEFA
Rules for classification: Qualifying tiebreakers
(H) Hosts
22 March 2023
15:00

Turkey	6–2	England
Mustafa Karaman 15:41; Eren Büyükkaya 21:34; Nathan 24:38 (o.g.); Efecan Saçikara 33:13; Melih Turğut 34:53; Koraycan Akbaş 38:42	Report	Barber 11:19; Desborough 14:08 (pen.)

PalaErcole, Policoro
Referee: Stefan Vrijens (Belgium)
22 March 2023
20:30

Czech Republic	0–3	Italy
	Report	Lavrendi 3:16; Perazzetta 31:04; Grosso 33:08

PalaErcole, Policoro
Referee: Marjan Mladenovski (North Macedonia)

23 March 2023
15:00

Czech Republic	4–2	Turkey
Šiler 0:44; Ji. Zápotocký 10:46; Tilinger 14:51; Ja. Zápotocký 33:49	Report	Mustafa Karaman 0:32; Koraycan Akbaş 14:37

PalaErcole, Policoro
Referee: Nikola Rabrenović (Serbia)
23 March 2023
20:30

Italy	2–2	England
Salvetti 23:04; Grosso 34:41	Report	Barber 9:15; Nathan 39:56

PalaErcole, Policoro

25 March 2023
15:00

England	3–4	Czech Republic
Badham 2:37, 39:41; Kaye 35:38	Report	Kuta 5:56; Šiler 12:31; Tomek 23:01; Zápotocký 38:59

PalaErcole, Policoro
Referee: Stefan Vrijens (Belgium), Marjan Mladenovski (North Macedonia)
25 March 2023
20:30

Italy	4–2	Turkey
Perazzetta 13:40, 39:43; Perazzetta 26:14; Bui 32:43	Report	Enes Gümüş 7:09; Melih Turğut 36:00

PalaErcole, Policoro

== Qualified teams ==
The following eight teams qualify for the final tournament.

Team	Qualified as	Qualified on	Previous appearances in Under-19 Futsal Euro^{1}
Croatia	Hosts	20 September 2022	2 (2019, 2022)
Slovenia	Main round Group 1 winners	25 March 2023	0 (debut)
Ukraine	Main round Group 2 winners	25 March 2023	2 (2019, 2022)
Portugal	Main round Group 3 winners	24 March 2023	2 (2019, 2022)
Finland	Main round Group 4 winners	25 March 2023	0 (debut)
France	Main round Group 5 winners	25 March 2023	1 (2022)
Spain	Main round Group 6 winners	25 March 2023	2 (**2019**, **2022**)
Italy	Main round Group 7 winners	25 March 2023	1 (2022)

^{1} Bold indicates champions for that year. Italic indicates hosts for that year.

== Top goalscorers ==
- Preliminary round: There were 71 goals scored in 12 matches, for an average of 5.92 goals per match.
- Main round: There were 278 goals scored in 42 matches, for an average of 6.62 goals per match.

— Team eliminated / inactive for this stage.

Rank	Player	PR	MR	Total
1	(Kosovo) Blend Krasniqi	4	6	10
2	(Belarus) Daniil Astafyeu	—	6	6
2	(Slovenia) Alen Ruis	—	6	6
2	(France) Mamady Kouyate	—	6	6
2	(Portugal) Diogo Silva	—	6	6
6	(Estonia) Roman Bažkov	5	—	5
6	(Poland) Szymon Licznerski	—	5	5
