= 2023 UEFA Under-19 Futsal Championship =

Tournament details
- Host country: Croatia
- City: Poreč
- Dates: 3–10 September
- Teams: 8 (from 1 confederation)
- Venue(s): 1 (in 1 host city)

Final positions
- Champions: Portugal (1st title)
- Runners-up: Spain

Tournament statistics
- Matches played: 15
- Goals scored: 101 (6.73 per match)
- Attendance: 3,837 (256 per match)
- Top scorer(s): (Portugal) Lúcio Júnior (5 goals)
- Best player(s): (Portugal) Lúcio Júnior

The 2023 UEFA Under-19 Futsal Championship (also known as UEFA Under-19 Futsal Euro 2023) was the third edition of the UEFA Under-19 Futsal Championship, the biennial international youth futsal championship organised by UEFA for the men's under-19 national teams of Europe. The tournament was hosted at the Žatika Sport Centre in Poreč, Croatia from 3 to 10 September 2023. A total of eight teams participated in the final tournament, with players born on or after 1 January 2004 being eligible to participate.

In a rematch of the previous final, Portugal defeated two-time defending champions Spain by 6–2 to secure their first title.

== Qualification ==
Seven teams qualified to join the hosts in the final tournament. The qualifying draw was held on 3 November 2022. The preliminary round was held between 18 and 21 January 2023, and the main round was held between 22 and 26 March 2023.

Team	Qualified as	Qualified on	Previous appearances in Under-19 Futsal Euro^{1}
Croatia	Hosts	20 September 2022	2 (2019, 2022)
Slovenia	Main round Group 1 winners	25 March 2023	0 (debut)
Ukraine	Main round Group 2 winners	25 March 2023	2 (2019, 2022)
Portugal	Main round Group 3 winners	24 March 2023	2 (2019, 2022)
Finland	Main round Group 4 winners	25 March 2023	0 (debut)
France	Main round Group 5 winners	25 March 2023	1 (2022)
Spain	Main round Group 6 winners	25 March 2023	2 (**2019**, **2022**)
Italy	Main round Group 7 winners	25 March 2023	1 (2022)

^{1} Bold indicates champions for that year. Italic indicates hosts for that year.

== Squads ==
Each national team have to submit a squad of 14 players, two of whom must be goalkeepers.

== Group stage ==
The group winners and runners-up advance to the semi-finals.

Tiebreakers

In the group stage, teams are ranked according to points (3 points for a win, 1 point for a draw, 0 points for a loss), and if tied on points, the following tiebreaking criteria are applied, in the order given, to determine the rankings (Regulations Articles 18.01 and 18.02):

1. Points in head-to-head matches among tied teams;
2. Goal difference in head-to-head matches among tied teams;
3. Goals scored in head-to-head matches among tied teams;
4. If more than two teams are tied, and after applying all head-to-head criteria above, a subset of teams are still tied, all head-to-head criteria above are reapplied exclusively to this subset of teams;
5. Goal difference in all group matches;
6. Goals scored in all group matches;
7. Penalty shoot-out if only two teams have the same number of points, and they met in the last round of the group and are tied after applying all criteria above (not used if more than two teams have the same number of points, or if their rankings are not relevant for qualification for the next stage);
8. Disciplinary points (red card = 3 points, yellow card = 1 point, expulsion for two yellow cards in one match = 3 points);
9. UEFA coefficient for the qualifying round draw;
10. Drawing of lots.

=== Group A ===
Pos	Team	Pld	W	D	L	GF	GA	GD	Pts	Qualification
1	Portugal	3	3	0	0	14	7	+7	9	Knockout stage
2	Spain	3	1	1	1	11	10	+1	4	Knockout stage
3	Croatia (H)	3	0	2	1	12	13	−1	2	
4	France	3	0	1	2	9	16	−7	1	

Source: UEFA
Rules for classification: Group stage tiebreakers
(H) Hosts
3 September 2023
18:00

Portugal	5–3	Spain
	Report

Žatika Arena, Poreč
Attendance: 311
3 September 2023
20:30

Croatia	6–6	France
	Report

Žatika Arena, Poreč
Attendance: 298

4 September 2023
18:00

France	1–5	Portugal
	Report

Žatika Arena, Poreč
Attendance: 150
4 September 2023
20:30

Spain	3–3	Croatia
	Report

Žatika Arena, Poreč
Attendance: 300

6 September 2023
18:00

Spain	5–2	France
	Report

Žatika Arena, Poreč
Attendance: 126
6 September 2023
20:30

Croatia	3–4	Portugal
	Report

Žatika Arena, Poreč
Attendance: 608

=== Group B ===
Pos	Team	Pld	W	D	L	GF	GA	GD	Pts	Qualification
1	Ukraine	3	2	0	1	12	8	+4	6 (Note: Tied on head-to-head points. Head-to-head goal difference: Ukraine +1, Slovenia 0, Italy −1.)	Knockout stage
2	Slovenia	3	2	0	1	10	8	+2	6	Knockout stage
3	Italy	3	2	0	1	9	5	+4	6	
4	Finland	3	0	0	3	6	16	−10	0	

Source: UEFA
Rules for classification: Group stage tiebreakers
Notes:
3 September 2023
13:00

Finland	2–4	Slovenia
	Report

Žatika Arena, Poreč
Attendance: 256
3 September 2023
15:30

Ukraine	1–2	Italy
	Report

Žatika Arena, Poreč
Attendance: 217

4 September 2023
13:00

Slovenia	2–4	Ukraine
	Report

Žatika Arena, Poreč
Attendance: 185
4 September 2023
15:00

Italy	5–0	Finland
	Report

Žatika Arena, Poreč
Attendance: 103

6 September 2023
13:00

Ukraine	7–4	Finland
	Report

Žatika Arena, Poreč
Attendance: 130
6 September 2023
15:30

Slovenia	4–2	Italy
	Report

Žatika Arena, Poreč
Attendance: 153

== Knockout stage ==
In the knockout stage, extra time and penalty shoot-out are used to decide the winner if necessary.

=== Bracket ===
Semi-finals
8 September – Poreč
Portugal	3
Slovenia	2
8 September – Poreč
Ukraine	2
Spain	3

Final
10 September – Poreč
Portugal	6
Spain	2

=== Semi-finals ===
8 September 2023
17:30

Portugal	3−2	Slovenia
	Report

Žatika Arena, Poreč
Attendance: 400

8 September 2023
20:30

Ukraine	2–3	Spain
	Report

Žatika Arena, Poreč
Attendance: 150

=== Final ===
10 September 2023
20:30

Portugal	6–2	Spain
	Report

Žatika Arena, Poreč
Attendance: 450
