= 2025 UEFA Under-19 Futsal Championship qualification =

Tournament details
- Dates: 22 January – 30 March 2025
- Teams: 35 (from 1 confederation)

Tournament statistics
- Matches played: 54
- Goals scored: 354 (6.56 per match)
- Top scorer(s): (Germany) Franz Born (7 goals)
- All statistics correct as of 30 March 2025.

The 2025 UEFA Under-19 Futsal Championship qualifying competition is the men's under-19 futsal competition to determine the seven teams joining the automatically qualified hosts Moldova in the 2025 UEFA Under-19 Futsal Championship final tournament. Players born on or after 1 January 2006 are eligible to participate.

== Teams ==
Apart from Moldova, a total of 35 (out of 54) UEFA member national teams entered the qualifying stage. They are seeded on the basis of the associations' results in the 2018/19 and 2021/22 competitions.

The 25 highest-ranked teams entered the main round, while the 10 lowest-ranked teams entered the preliminary round. The coefficient ranking was also used for seeding in the preliminary round and main round draws, where each team was assigned a seeding position according to their ranking for the respective draw.

Teams entering Preliminary Round

Pot 1
Team	Coeff	Rank
Georgia	3.000	26
Azerbaijan	3.000	27
North Macedonia	1.750	28

Pot 2
Team	Coeff	Rank
Kosovo	1.633	29
Lithuania	0.667	30
Gibraltar	0.500	31

Pot 3
Team	Coeff	Rank
Malta	0.500	32
Germany	0.500	33
San Marino	0.333	34
Estonia	0.167	35

Teams entering Main Round

Pot 1
Team	Coeff	Rank
Spain	18.667	1
Portugal	17.500	2
Ukraine	12.595	3
Poland	11.667	4
Croatia	11.200	5
Slovenia	8.619	6
Italy	8.500	7

Pot 2
Team	Coeff	Rank
France	8.333	8
Belgium	7.000	9
Finland	6.833	10
Bosnia and Herzegovina	6.667	11
Czech Republic	6.333	12
Romania	6.133	13
Netherlands	6.000	14

Pot 3
Team	Coeff	Rank
Serbia	6.000	15
Turkey	6.000	16
Latvia	6.000	17
Hungary	5.333	18
Slovakia	5.333	19
Belarus	5.333	20
Greece	4.750	21

Pot 4
Team	Coeff	Rank
Kazakhstan	3.667	22
Andorra	3.500	23
Montenegro	3.367	24
England	3.333	25
Azerbaijan	3.000	27
Germany	0.500	33
Estonia	0.167	35

== Format ==
In the preliminary round and main round, each group is played as a round-robin mini-tournament at the pre-selected hosts.

=== Tiebreakers ===
In the preliminary round and main round, teams are ranked according to points (3 points for a win, 1 point for a draw, 0 points for a loss), and if tied on points, the following tiebreaking criteria are applied, in the order given, to determine the rankings (Regulations Articles 14.01 and 14.02):

1. Points in head-to-head matches among tied teams;
2. Goal difference in head-to-head matches among tied teams;
3. Goals scored in head-to-head matches among tied teams;
4. If more than two teams are tied, and after applying all head-to-head criteria above, a subset of teams are still tied, all head-to-head criteria above are reapplied exclusively to this subset of teams;
5. Goal difference in all group matches;
6. Goals scored in all group matches;
7. Penalty shoot-out if only two teams have the same number of points, and they met in the last round of the group and are tied after applying all criteria above (not used if more than two teams have the same number of points, or if their rankings are not relevant for qualification for the next stage);
8. Disciplinary points (red card = 3 points, yellow card = 1 point, expulsion for two yellow cards in one match = 3 points);
9. UEFA coefficient for the qualifying round draw;

== Preliminary round ==
The winners of each group advance to main round to join the 27 teams which receive byes to main round.

Times are CET (UTC+1), as listed by UEFA (local times, if different, are in parentheses).

=== Group A ===
Pos	Team	Pld	W	D	L	GF	GA	GD	Pts	Qualification
1	Germany	3	2	1	0	11	4	+7	7	Main round
2	Georgia	3	1	2	0	17	8	+9	5	
3	Malta	3	1	0	2	5	18	−13	3	
4	Lithuania (H)	3	0	1	2	10	13	−3	1	

Source: UEFA
Rules for classification: Qualifying tiebreakers
(H) Hosts
22 January 2025
15:30

Georgia	1–1	Germany
Airapetyan 23:59	Report	Xydias 21:21

LSC „Druskininkai“ Hall, Druskininkai
Attendance: 86
Referee: Subashi (ALB), Tadic (BIH)
22 January 2025
18:30

Malta	3–2	Lithuania
Coulaud 13:59; Abo Assaf 27:13, 32:30	Report	Zenkovas 4:51, 8:47

LSC „Druskininkai“ Hall, Druskininkai
Attendance: 128
Referee: Van Dijke (NED), Ciuplea (WAL)

23 January 2025
15:30

Malta	0–9	Georgia
	Report	Gogokhia 0:38, 28:02; Airapetyan 3:39, 33:47; Chikirovi 18:25; Tsereteli 19:43; Kartsivadze 21:52; Lomaia 34:08; Tsalugelashvili 38:49

LSC „Druskininkai“ Hall, Druskininkai
Attendance: 54
Referee: Ciuplea (WAL), Subashi (ALB)
23 January 2025
18:30

Lithuania	1–3	Germany
Baltakys 33:01	Report	Fiedler 4'36"; Melissopoulos 20:09; Born 22:25

LSC „Druskininkai“ Hall, Druskininkai
Attendance: 93
Referee: Tadic (BIH), Van Dijke (NED)

25 January 2025
15:30

Germany	7–2	Malta
Smith 19:33; Born 22:57; Melissopoulos 23:46, 36:34; Berretta 33:55; Rabiega 37:32; Gauci 39:56 (o.g.)	Report	Vella 24:48; Suda 33:17

LSC „Druskininkai“ Hall, Druskininkai
Attendance: 28
Referee: Tadic (BIH), Subashi (ALB)
25 January 2025

Lithuania	7–7	Georgia
Rusteika 8:17, 24:21; Virvičius 10:52, 11:14, 39:09; Zenkovas 21:17; Kurec 37:43	Report	Chikirovi 4:32, 34:27, 36:53, 37:52; Tsalugelashvili 24:50; Ciesiūnas 30:54 (o.g.); Gogokhia 38:41

LSC „Druskininkai“ Hall, Druskininkai
Attendance: 103
Referee: Van Dijke (NED), Ciuplea (WAL)

=== Group B ===
Pos	Team	Pld	W	D	L	GF	GA	GD	Pts	Qualification
1	Azerbaijan	2	1	1	0	6	3	+3	4	Main round
2	Kosovo	2	1	0	1	8	5	+3	3	
3	San Marino (H)	2	0	1	1	3	9	−6	1	

Source: UEFA
Rules for classification: Qualifying tiebreakers
(H) Hosts
24 January 2025
18:00

Kosovo	7–1	San Marino
Barbano 0:38 (o.g.); Jashanica 1:43; Syla 12:19; Musliu 14:56; Berisha 24:40; Sadiku 28:02; Musoli 30:35	Report	Andolina 8:23

Multieventi Sport Domus, Serravalle
Attendance: 202
Referee: Bergs (BEL), Cep (CZE)

25 January 2025
18:00

Azerbaijan	4–1	Kosovo
Jafarzade 17:39; Alakbarov 22:22, 35:47; Mashiyev 31:34	Report	Musoli 5:12

Multieventi Sport Domus, Serravalle
Attendance: 37
Referee: Cep (CZE), Czene-Joó (HUN)

26 January 2025
18:00

San Marino	2–2	Azerbaijan
Beccari 17:14; Dolcini 31:05	Report	Mahmudzada 23:21; Alakbarov 28:19

Multieventi Sport Domus, Serravalle
Attendance: 217
Referee: Czene-Joó (HUN), Bergs (BEL)

=== Group C ===
Pos	Team	Pld	W	D	L	GF	GA	GD	Pts	Qualification
1	Estonia (H)	2	2	0	0	11	4	+7	6	Main round
2	North Macedonia	2	1	0	1	4	4	0	3	
3	Gibraltar	2	0	0	2	4	11	−7	0	

Source: UEFA
Rules for classification: Qualifying tiebreakers
(H) Hosts
22 January 2025
17:00

Gibraltar	3–8	Estonia
Gonzalez 3:14; Hancock 23:34; Dalmedo 27:13	Report	Minajev 7:18, 10:02, 37':27 (pen.); Karhanin 9':51; Fortunato 16:20 (o.g.); Šipunov 18:12; Krupski 29:12; Lužin 39:30

Sillamäe Spordikompleks Kalev, Sillamäe
Attendance: 511
Referee: Bliadze (GEO), Naudi (MLT)

23 January 2025
17:00

North Macedonia	3–1	Gibraltar
Tonevski 24:19; Janev 26:18, 35:21	Report	Diaz 26:55

Sillamäe Spordikompleks Kalev, Sillamäe
Attendance: 190
Referee: Tursumbayev (KAZ), Bliadze (GEO)

24 January 2025
17:00

Estonia	3–1	North Macedonia
Krupski 25:39; Minajev 32:04, 39:21	Report	Mitrovski 2:31

Sillamäe Spordikompleks Kalev, Sillamäe
Attendance: 665
Referee: Tursumbayev (KAZ), Naudi (MLT)

== Main round ==
The winners of each group advance to the final tournament.

Times are CET/CEST, (Note: CET (UTC+1) for dates up to 26 March 2025, and CEST (UTC+2) for dates thereafter.) as listed by UEFA (local times, if different, are in parentheses).

=== Group 1 ===
Pos	Team	Pld	W	D	L	GF	GA	GD	Pts	Qualification
1	Italy	3	3	0	0	16	7	+9	9	Final tournament
2	Slovakia (H)	3	2	0	1	9	8	+1	6	
3	Germany	3	1	0	2	13	13	0	3	
4	Romania	3	0	0	3	5	15	−10	0	

Source: UEFA
Rules for classification: Qualifying tiebreakers
(H) Hosts
27 March 2025
11:30

Italy	5–2	Germany
Modesto 15:03, 34:32; Musumeci 16:20; Grosso 21:07, 31:39	Report	Moufqkir 10:52 (o.g.); Fiedler 37:37

Aréna Poprad, Poprad
Referee: Martin Køster (Denmark), Srdjan Mihajlovic (Serbia)
27 March 2025
14:00

Romania	0–1	Slovakia
	Report	Komárek 36:56

Aréna Poprad, Poprad
Referee: Nicolas Nicolaou (Cyprus), Jordan Feltesse (France)

28 March 2025
16:00

Romania	2–4	Italy
Butiurca 10:59 (pen.); Soos 23:24	Report	Cutruneo 1:03; Moratelli 8:26, 25:06, 30:42

Aréna Poprad, Poprad
Referee: Srdjan Mihajlovic (Serbia), Martin Køster (Denmark)
28 March 2025
18:30

Slovakia	5–1	Germany
Kajaba 22:38, 23:00; Kovács 25:45; Faizi 27:50; Solárik 37:23	Report	Born 28:44

Aréna Poprad, Poprad
Referee: Srdjan Mihajlovic (Serbia), Nicolas Nicolaou (Cyprus)

30 March 2025
16:00

Germany	10–3	Romania
Melissopoulos 0:10, 13:54, 31:34; Born 12:03, 12:20, 20:33, 32:44; Xydias 21:33, 34:34; Berretta 38:47 (pen.)	Report	Kis 20:52; Butiurca 22:50, 33:46 (pen.)

Aréna Poprad, Poprad
Referee: Nicolas Nicolaou (Cyprus), Jordan Feltesse (France)
30 March 2025
18:30

Slovakia	4–7	Italy
Varšo 23:11, 25:32; Modesto 26:10 (o.g.); Kajaba 31:16	Report	Ceccarelli 1:27, 24:07 (pen.), 32:27; Musumeci 6:01; Modesto 10:27; Grosso 13:28; Moratelli 21:54

Aréna Poprad, Poprad
Referee: Jordan Feltesse (France), Srdjan Mihajlovic (Serbia)

=== Group 2 ===
Pos	Team	Pld	W	D	L	GF	GA	GD	Pts	Qualification
1	Spain	3	3	0	0	17	1	+16	9	Final tournament
2	Hungary (H)	3	2	0	1	9	8	+1	6	
3	Finland	3	0	1	2	6	9	−3	1	
4	England	3	0	1	2	4	18	−14	1	

Source: UEFA
Rules for classification: Qualifying tiebreakers
(H) Hosts
26 March 2025
16:00

Finland	2–3	Hungary
Kabinga 7:51; Paappanen 35:23	Report	Bognár 11:37; Somogyi 15:57; Molnár 38:12

Suzuki Arena, Esztergom
Referee: Jagnar Jakobson (Estonia), Andrea Naudi (Malta)
26 March 2025
19:00

Spain	9–0	England
Pablo Guti 0:26; Pol López 1:59, 11:47, 32:46; González 2:34, 38:12; Olivares Fernández 8:47, 21:53; Martinez-Olivares 13:40	Report

Suzuki Arena, Esztergom
Referee: Dario Pezzuto (Italy), Antonios Adamopoulosm (Greece)

27 March 2025
16:00

Finland	1–3	Spain
Lindberg 38:05	Report	Antonio Añasco 0:44; Olivares Fernández 32:23; Lahoz 32:36

Suzuki Arena, Esztergom
Referee: Antonios Adamopoulosm (Greece), Jagnar Jakobson (Estonia)
27 March 2025
19:00

Hungary	6–1	England
Bognár 8:38, 28:05; Somogyi 15:48 (pen.); Magyari 21:18; Kovács 23:58, 39:46	Report	Wilson 14:01

Suzuki Arena, Esztergom
Referee: Andrea Naudi (Malta), Dario Pezzuto (Italy)

29 March 2025
13:00

England	3–3	Finland
Smith 0:15, 17:24; Cook 37:17	Report	Mara 3:33, 27:21; Paappanen 37:59

Suzuki Arena, Esztergom
Referee: Andrea Naudi (Malta), Antonios Adamopoulosm (Greece)
29 March 2025
16:00

Hungary	0–5	Spain
	Report	Pablo Guti 0:47, 9:28; Martínez 7:40; Pol López 10:30; Lahoz 32:21

Suzuki Arena, Esztergom
Referee: Dario Pezzuto (Italy), Jagnar Jakobson (Estonia)

=== Group 3 ===
Pos	Team	Pld	W	D	L	GF	GA	GD	Pts	Qualification
1	Portugal (H)	3	2	1	0	16	7	+9	7	Final tournament
2	France	3	2	1	0	9	6	+3	7	
3	Kazakhstan	3	1	0	2	4	7	−3	3	
4	Belarus	3	0	0	3	4	13	−9	0	

Source: UEFA
Rules for classification: Qualifying tiebreakers
(H) Hosts
27 March 2025
16:00

France	3–1	Kazakhstan
Oubrik 12:10; Mohamed Adam 24:46; E. Kolski 35:41	Report	Kamalov 18:13

Pavilhão Multiusos, Gondomar
Referee: Ugur Cakmak (Türkiye), Laurentiu Deaconu (Romania)
27 March 2025
19:00

Belarus	2–9	Portugal
Kabanau 0:15; Karostik 6:17	Report	Monteiro 1:12; Cordeiro 1:52, 11:47; Pereira 3:43; Trafimuk 12:14 (o.g.); Sousa 25:09; Renato Almeida 28:44; Baldé 35:11; Mourinha 39:51

Pavilhão Multiusos, Gondomar
Referee: Jacob Willem Machiel Van Dijke (The Netherlands), Jasmina Mickoska (Serbia)

28 March 2025
17:00

Belarus	1–2	France
Trafimuk 39:28	Report	Mohamed Adam 16:33; Laghmouche 26:18

Pavilhão Multiusos, Gondomar
Referee: Jasmina Mickoska (Serbia), Ugur Cakmak (Türkiye)
28 March 2025
20:00

Portugal	3–1	Kazakhstan
Mourinha 13:02, 32:10; Baldé 37:22 (pen.)	Report	Tarasenko 31:22 (pen.)

Pavilhão Multiusos, Gondomar
Referee: Laurentiu Deaconu (Romania), Jacob Willem Machiel Van Dijke (The Netherlands)

30 March 2025
13:00

Kazakhstan	2–1	Belarus
Kabanau 13:55 (o.g.); Tileubergen 14:40	Report	Kuzniatsou 39:45

Pavilhão Multiusos, Gondomar
Referee: Jasmina Mickoska (Serbia), Ugur Cakmak (Türkiye)
30 March 2025
16:00

Portugal	4-4	France
Almeida 05:25; Renato Almeida 06:15; Pereira 19:23; E. Kolski 19:49 (o.g.)	Report	Le Pessot 05:05, 19:34; Megrous 26:33; El Kaïm Billah 28:58

Pavilhão Multiusos, Gondomar
Referee: Laurentiu Deaconu (Romania), Jacob Willem Machiel Van Dijke (The Netherlands)

=== Group 4 ===
Pos	Team	Pld	W	D	L	GF	GA	GD	Pts	Qualification
1	Slovenia	3	3	0	0	16	5	+11	9	Final tournament
2	Belgium	3	2	0	1	22	8	+14	6	
3	Latvia (H)	3	1	0	2	10	12	−2	3	
4	Andorra	3	0	0	3	1	24	−23	0	

Source: UEFA
Rules for classification: Qualifying tiebreakers
(H) Hosts
26 March 2025
15:00

Slovenia	5–0	Andorra
Sevenšek 2:57, 21:22; J. Angulo 29:07 (o.g.); Prah 30:47; Mi. Čop 33:40	Report

Zemgale Olympic Center, Jelgava
Referee: Aslan Galayev (Kazakhstan), Martin Matula (Slovakia)
26 March 2025
18:00

Belgium	5–3	Latvia
El Bouich 10:16; Iommazzo 15:42; Ouazrhari 19:40; De Cock 38:25, 39:43 (pen.)	Report	Timbers 25:50; Grava 28:07; Atamaņukovs 30:35

Zemgale Olympic Center, Jelgava
Referee: Martina Piccolo (Italy), Idan Berenshtein (Israel)

27 March 2025
15:00

Belgium	2–5	Slovenia
Lornoy 0:30; Ouazrhari 13:14	Report	Avdić 3:09; Trdin 10:22, 24:27; Krašovec 29:10; Sevenšek 33:26

Zemgale Olympic Center, Jelgava
Referee: Idan Berenshtein (Israel), Aslan Galayev (Kazakhstan)
27 March 2025
18:00

Latvia	4–1	Andorra
Motiļs 4:03; Ribeiro 19:24 (o.g.); Moldovāns 23:07; Timbers 39:57	Report	J. Angulo 33:32

Zemgale Olympic Center, Jelgava
Referee: Martin Matula (Slovakia), Martina Piccolo (Italy)

29 March 2025
13:00

Andorra	0–15	Belgium
	Report	De Cock 2:29, 18:31, 26:18, 34:32; El Bouich 3:27, 24:58; Iommazzo 4:29; Bergamo 8:40, 13:35, 14:44; Killian 17:12; Mazrouh 19:50, 29:02; Hadri 36:54; Braet 38:29

Zemgale Olympic Center, Jelgava
Referee: Idan Berenshtein (Israel), Martin Matula (Slovakia)
29 March 2025
16:00

Latvia	3–6	Slovenia
Moldovāns 19:08; Grava 22:30; Itkačs 31:16	Report	Sevenšek 5:07, 27:15; Avdić 7:10; Mi. Čop 9:49, 35:53; Gradišar 35:21

Zemgale Olympic Center, Jelgava
Referee: Aslan Galayev (Kazakhstan), Martina Piccolo (Italy)

=== Group 5 ===
Pos	Team	Pld	W	D	L	GF	GA	GD	Pts	Qualification
1	Ukraine	3	3	0	0	16	4	+12	9	Final tournament
2	Serbia (H)	3	2	0	1	6	5	+1	6	
3	Netherlands	3	1	0	2	11	11	0	3	
4	Montenegro	3	0	0	3	6	19	−13	0	

Source: UEFA
Rules for classification: Qualifying tiebreakers
(H) Hosts
26 March 2025
16:00

Netherlands	2–3	Serbia
Filemieg 21:38; Senden 27:37	Report	Nešić 10:49, 15:34; Cama 39:54

Sports Hall Vlade Divac, Vrnjacka Banja
Referee: Roosa-Maria Karoliina Tuomi (Finland), Péter Zimonyi (Hungary)
26 March 2025
19:00

Ukraine	9–2	Montenegro
Pershyn 2:56, 7:00; Savych 6:37, 24:40, 29:07; Zhukov 8:41, 10:18, 28:33; Shkliaruk 15:25	Report	Barjaktaroviq 19:51; Ćetković 24:51

Sports Hall Vlade Divac, Vrnjacka Banja
Referee: Done Ristovski (North Macedonia), Bryan Claude François (France)

27 March 2025
16:00

Serbia	3–2	Montenegro
Barišić 9:35; Mušović 13:20; Đorović 19:56	Report	Mandić 29:48; Barjaktaroviq 33:26

Sports Hall Vlade Divac, Vrnjacka Banja
Referee: Bryan Claude François (France), Roosa-Maria Karoliina Tuomi (Finland)
27 March 2025
19:00

Netherlands	2–6	Ukraine
Filemieg 13:48; Senden 31:09	Report	Pershyn 4:02; Savych 17:59; Zhukov 19:58, 20:25; Rostkivskyi 24:31; Malynovskyi 37:39

Sports Hall Vlade Divac, Vrnjacka Banja
Referee: Péter Zimonyi (Hungary), Done Ristovski (North Macedonia)

29 March 2025
16:00

Montenegro	2–7	Netherlands
Jelić 26:53; Ćetković 39:07	Report	El Arnouki 3:56; Filemieg 11:04, 25:18, 38:53; El Boughlali 18:39; Senden 28:42; Boerefijn 31:54

Sports Hall Vlade Divac, Vrnjacka Banja
Referee: Bryan Claude François (France), Péter Zimonyi (Hungary)
29 March 2025
19:00

Serbia	0–1	Ukraine
	Report	Prykhodko 15:32

Sports Hall Vlade Divac, Vrnjacka Banja
Referee: Roosa-Maria Karoliina Tuomi (Finland), Done Ristovski (North Macedonia)

=== Group 6 ===
Pos	Team	Pld	W	D	L	GF	GA	GD	Pts	Qualification
1	Czech Republic (H)	3	3	0	0	9	1	+8	9	Final tournament
2	Poland	3	2	0	1	15	7	+8	6	
3	Greece	3	1	0	2	7	12	−5	3	
4	Estonia	3	0	0	3	4	15	−11	0	

Source: UEFA
Rules for classification: Qualifying tiebreakers
(H) Hosts
25 March 2025
15:00

Poland	8–1	Estonia
Sławkowski 1:17; Sowa 1:33; Pawlus 2:37, 3:57; Haraburda 6:14; Górkiewicz 8:11; Kozak 37:16; Bednarski 9:26	Report	Sirotkin 27:51

TJ Lokomotiva, Plzeň
Referee: Stephen Vella (Malta), Noelia Gutierrez Muñoz (Spain)
25 March 2025
19:00

Greece	0–3	Czech Republic
	Report	Rešetár 10:07, 20:10; Pečenka 32:42

TJ Lokomotiva, Plzeň
Referee: Paavo Komppa (Finland), Jernej Petek (Slovenia)

26 March 2025
15:00

Greece	2–6	Poland
Gerolymos 12:09; Gionas 39:50	Report	Sowa 5:29; Sławkowski 9:45, 37:06, 39:23; Haraburda 11:25, 36:24 (pen.)

TJ Lokomotiva, Plzeň
Referee: Jernej Petek (Slovenia), Stephen Vella (Malta)
26 March 2025
19:00

Czech Republic	2–0	Estonia
Bíško 1:48 (pen.); Kuta 38:10	Report

TJ Lokomotiva, Plzeň
Referee: Noelia Gutierrez Muñoz (Spain), Paavo Komppa (Finland)

28 March 2025
15:00

Estonia	3–5	Greece
Gionas 3:10 (o.g.); Karhanin 11'35; Sirotkin 35:48	Report	Filippatos 12:53; Nikolaou 25:31; Bechrakis 29:04; Gionas 34:37; Xylardistos 39:23

TJ Lokomotiva, Plzeň
Referee: Noelia Gutierrez Muñoz (Spain), Stephen Vella (Malta)
28 March 2025
19:00

Czech Republic	4–1	Poland
Pečenka 3:13, 39:40; Hromek 34:25, 38:12	Report	Pawlus 12:59

TJ Lokomotiva, Plzeň
Referee: Paavo Komppa (Finland), Jernej Petek (Slovenia)

=== Group 7 ===
Pos	Team	Pld	W	D	L	GF	GA	GD	Pts	Qualification
1	Turkey	3	2	1	0	10	7	+3	7	Final tournament
2	Bosnia and Herzegovina	3	1	1	1	15	8	+7	4	
3	Croatia (H)	3	0	3	0	8	8	0	3	
4	Azerbaijan	3	0	1	2	6	16	−10	1	

Source: UEFA
Rules for classification: Qualifying tiebreakers
(H) Hosts
26 March 2025
16:00

Bosnia and Herzegovina	10–2	Azerbaijan
Arnaut 0:14, 14:22, 15:04; Hodžić 3:41, 8:19; Mustafić 14:51; Marković 19:55, 33:53; Hrštić 32:00; Azabagić 36:53	Report	Alakbarov 12:24; Valizada 33:10

Sportska dvorana Ribnjak, Omiš
Referee: Rastislav Behancin (Slovakia), Liviu Dumitru Chita (Romania)
26 March 2025
19:00

Turkey	3–3	Croatia
Recep Inanç 14:42, 36:39; Burhan Tuzun 25:57	Report	Barišić 27:52, 38:18; Posavec 28:20

Sportska dvorana Ribnjak, Omiš
Referee: Filipa Prata (Portugal), Kastriot Gerxhaliu (Sweden)

27 March 2025
16:00

Turkey	4–3	Bosnia and Herzegovina
Ege Bilim 7:13, 35:36, 39:08; Burhan Tuzun 12:53	Report	Marković 6:25; Mujanović 19:07; Recep Inanç 28:56 (o.g.)

Sportska dvorana Ribnjak, Omiš
Referee: Kastriot Gerxhaliu (Sweden), Rastislav Behancin (Slovakia)
27 March 2025
19:00

Croatia	3–3	Azerbaijan
Ferenček 2:42, 34:24; Šarčević 39:47	Report	Huseynov 6:56; Alakbarov 16:11, 39:59

Sportska dvorana Ribnjak, Omiš
Referee: Liviu Dumitru Chita (Romania), Filipa Prata (Portugal)

29 March 2025
16:00

Azerbaijan	1–3	Turkey
Sadigli 33:20	Report	Ahmet Köksal 11:05; Ege Bilim 17:58; Recep Inanç 29:10

Sportska dvorana Ribnjak, Omiš
Referee: Filipa Prata (Portugal), Rastislav Behancin (Slovakia)
29 March 2025
19:00

Croatia	2–2	Bosnia and Herzegovina
Arnaut 01:46 (o.g.); Kulić 31:35	Report	Mujanović 18:58; Marković 34:36

Sportska dvorana Ribnjak, Omiš
Referee: Kastriot Gerxhaliu (Sweden), Liviu Dumitru Chita (Romania)
