= Anton Eerola =

Finnish footballer (born 1999)

Personal information
- Full name: Anton Kalle Oskari Eerola
- Date of birth: 4 December 1999 (age 26)
- Place of birth: Kotka, Finland
- Height: 1.98 m (6 ft 6 in)
- Position: Centre forward

Youth career
- PeKa
- KTP

Senior career*
Years	Team	Apps	(Gls)
2015–2018	PeKa	21	(6)
2017–2021	KTP	73	(12)
2022	Inter Leipzig	16	(10)
2022	1. FC Kaiserslautern II	12	(3)
2023	Nõmme Kalju	6	(0)
2023	→ Nõmme Kalju II	1	(1)
2023–2025	Jippo	34	(11)
- * Club domestic league appearances and goals as of 1 July 2025

Anton Kalle Oskari Eerola (born 4 December 1999) is a Finnish professional footballer who plays as a centre forward.

== Career statistics ==
As of 19 October 2024

Appearances and goals by club, season and competition
Club	Season	League			Cup (Note: Includes Suomen Cup)		Other		Total	
Club	Season	Division	Apps	Goals	Apps	Goals	Apps	Goals	Apps	Goals
PeKa	2015	Kolmonen	2	0	–		–		2	0
PeKa	2016	Kolmonen	14	3	2	0	–		16	3
PeKa	2018	Kolmonen	5	3	–		–		5	3
PeKa	Total		21	6	2	0	0	0	23	6
KTP	2017	Kakkonen	11	3	5	0	–		16	3
KTP	2018	Ykkönen	6	0	4	0	–		10	0
KTP	2019	Ykkönen	18	1	3	0	–		21	1
KTP	2020	Ykkönen	23	6	1	0	–		24	6
KTP	2021	Veikkausliiga	15	2	3	0	–		18	2
KTP	Total		73	12	16	0	0	0	88	12
Inter Leipzig	2021–22	NOFV-Oberliga Süd	16	10	–		–		16	10
1. FC Kaiserslautern II	2022–23	Oberliga Rheinland-Pfalz/Saar	12	3	–		–		12	3
Nõmme Kalju	2023	Meistriliiga	6	0	0	0	–		6	0
Nõmme Kalju U21	2023	Esiliiga B	1	1	–		–		1	1
Jippo	2023	Kakkonen	12	9	–		–		12	9
Jippo	2024	Ykkösliiga	25	3	1	0	–		26	3
Jippo	Total		37	12	1	0	0	0	38	12
Career total			166	44	19	0	0	0	184	44
