= UEFA Futsal Euro 2026 bidding process =

The UEFA Futsal Euro 2026 bidding process entails the bids for the UEFA Futsal Euro 2026. The hosting rights were given to Latvia and Lithuania on 2 December 2023, with Slovenia added later on to accommodate Belarus.

== Hosting requirements ==
The tournament would continue the format of the 2022 editions, with a total of 32 matches taking place for a duration of up to 20 days, with 16 teams competing in the tournament.

The requirements for the stadiums were as follows:

- 2 arenas, either in the same city or in two cities with a maximum of three hours away from each other
- 2 arenas, one with a capacity of 7,500 seats and the other with 4,500 seats
- 1 quality training facility per arena

== Schedule ==
Date	Notes
7 December 2022, 18:00 CET	Deadline for national associations to confirm their interest to bid
12 December 2022	Bid requirements are made available to the bidders
17 May 2023, 12:00 CET	Preliminary bid dossier submission deadline
11 October 2023, 12:00 CET	Final bid dossier submission deadline
2 December 2023	Appointment of hosts of UEFA Futsal Euro 2026

== Bids ==
The following countries applied:

- Belgium
- Finland
- France
- Latvia and Lithuania

=== Belgium ===
Belgium was one of the applicants for the UEFA Futsal Euro 2026. Originally working with France for a potential joint bid, they decided to go alone soon after. Belgium have previously hosted the event in 2014 and the final four of the UEFA Futsal Champions League in 2002–03.

=== Finland ===
On 23 May 2023, Finland announced their candidacy for the tournament. Their proposed venues are the Espoo Metro Areena in Espoo and the Tampere Ice Stadium in Tampere. The Finnish Football Association states that their previous experience with hosting UEFA tournaments, such as the 2018 UEFA European Under-19 Championship and 2022 UEFA Super Cup will help their bid, alongside the Finns growing passion for futsal. Ari Lahti, chairman of the Finnish Football Association said:

We have world-class event expertise and Finland is a quarter-finalist in the previous European Futsal Men's Championship, which gives strong support to our bid. We want to strengthen the growth of futsal both in Finland and in Europe and be a close part of the international futsal community, so it was a clear decision for us to participate in the bid to host the European Championship in Finland. We were very close to getting the 2025 European Women's Championship in the Nordic countries, and the process gave us valuable information about our strengths. We have the expertise, passion and good conditions to organize the first ever European Futsal Men's Championship in Finland.

While futsal development manager, Kirsi Nummela, says:

Futsal in Finland is constantly growing and interest in our national teams is high. The men's national futsal team has already shown that it belongs to the top of Europe. The conditions in Finland allow for a successful tournament, both in terms of sport and audience, and we would be able to offer the European futsal community a great competition. Organizing a home tournament would give Finnish futsal a great opportunity to take advantage of the competition fever in the sport's rise in Finland. We would have plenty of time to strengthen the junior activities that are starting and complete other strategic projects that strengthen the sport before the tournament. When the enthusiasm for the sport brings new enthusiasts to the sport thanks to strong marketing and a great event, we would be ready to welcome players to clubs all over Finland, while also being able to offer high-quality coaching to different age groups.

==== Overview of venues ====
- The Espoo Metro Areena has hosted the 2019 IIHF Women's World Championship, 2022 World Ringette Championships and 2023 European Figure Skating Championships. It was constructed in 1999.
- The Tampere Ice Stadium has hosted the World Ice Hockey Championships in 1965, 1982, 1991, 1997, 2003. It also hosted the 1992 IIHF Women's World Championship and 2021 Men's European Volleyball Championship. It was the main venue in the city before the Nokia Arena was built.

Venues in Finland
Espoo	UEFA Futsal Euro 2026 bidding process is located in Finland	Tampere
Espoo Metro Areena	UEFA Futsal Euro 2026 bidding process is located in Finland	Tampere Ice Stadium
Capacity: 8,500	UEFA Futsal Euro 2026 bidding process is located in Finland	Capacity: 7,000

=== France ===
On 17 November 2023, France announced their bid for the UEFA Futsal Euro 2026, with the capital, Paris, as the host city. For the bid, the French plans to have an eco-friendly and sustainable approach, with the tournament taking place within a 10 km (6.2 mi) radius. This application is also part of the French Football Federation's plan to overhaul and invest in the sport. The federation also wants to use the momentum of the 2024 Summer Olympics in Paris to bring more sports events to France. France have never hosted the event before, but has hosted the final four of the 2024–25 UEFA Futsal Champions League in Le Mans.

==== Overview of venues ====
- The Adidas Arena is a recently built arena that hosted the badminton and rhythmic gymnastics event at the 2024 Summer Olympics, followed by the para badminton and powerlifting at the 2024 Summer Paralympics. It is the home court for Paris Basketball and recently organised the 2025 BWF Badminton World Championships.
- The Stade Pierre de Coubertin is a small arena that formerly hosted some tennis events and now hosts Paris Saint-Germain Handball games.

Venues in France
Paris	UEFA Futsal Euro 2026 bidding process is located in France	Paris
Adidas Arena	UEFA Futsal Euro 2026 bidding process is located in France	Stade Pierre de Coubertin
Capacity: 9,000	UEFA Futsal Euro 2026 bidding process is located in France	Capacity: 3,600

=== Latvia and Lithuania ===
Latvia and Lithuania originally filed two solo bids before deciding to jointly bid. The merge happened in September 2023. The final would be held in Riga. Neither have hosted the event, but Lithuania has organised the 2021 FIFA Futsal World Cup, while Latvia previously held the 2019 UEFA Under-19 Futsal Championship and the final four of the 2021–22 UEFA Futsal Champions League.

==== Overview of venues ====
- The Žalgiris Arena in Kaunas is the largest arena in the Baltics. The venue has held EuroBasket 2011 and the 2021 FIFA Futsal World Cup.
- The Xiaomi Arena is Latvia's biggest indoor venue. Based in Riga, it has hosted various event including: EuroBasket in 2015 and 2025, the EuroBasket Women in 2009 and 2019, IIHF World Championship in 2006, 2021 and 2023 and the 2016 Men's World Floorball Championships.

Venues in Latvia and Lithuania
(Lithuania) Kaunas	UEFA Futsal Euro 2026 bidding process is located in Baltic states	(Latvia) Riga
Žalgiris Arena	UEFA Futsal Euro 2026 bidding process is located in Baltic states	Xiaomi Arena
Capacity: 15,415	UEFA Futsal Euro 2026 bidding process is located in Baltic states	Capacity: 9,975

== Withdrawn bids ==
=== Belgium and France ===
Belgium and France were originally bidding together for the UEFA Futsal Euro 2026. The joint bid quietly failed to materialise and both nations chose to bid alone. Belgium have previously hosted the event in 2014.

=== Latvia ===
On 8 December 2022, president of the Latvia Football Federation, Vadim Łashenko, stated that Latvia expressed an interest in hosting. He further stated that they received positive feedback from UEFA after their past hosting of UEFA events and that they were negotiating with Arena Riga (later renamed Xiaomi Arena) and the Rimi Olympic Centre about hosting the competition. Regarding the bid, Vadim Łashenko said this:

“We have expressed a clear interest, desire, and readiness to organize the European final tournament in Latvia. We have already accumulated a lot of experience in organizing such events, so we want to take the next step, after the final tournament of the UEFA European U-19 Futsal Championship and The UEFA Futsal Champions League Finals, with the participation of four of the continent’s strongest clubs and many futsal stars, we have proven that our staff, the city, and the infrastructure are capable and ready to organize events of this level at the highest level. The feedback from UEFA after the international tournaments organized by the LFF in the past has been positive, so we have decided to apply for the hosting of this final tournament. In the European Championship, the 16 best teams from the entire continent would come to Latvia, and it would be the highest-level indoor football tournament organized in Latvia so far.”

Latvia have previously held the 2019 UEFA Under-19 Futsal Championship and the final four of the 2021–22 UEFA Futsal Champions League. Latvia's solo bid ended once they merged their bid with Lithuania's.

==== Overview of venues ====
- The Xiaomi Arena is Latvia's biggest indoor venue. Based in Riga, it has hosted various event including: EuroBasket in 2015 and 2025, the EuroBasket Women in 2009 and 2019, IIHF World Championship in 2006, 2021 and 2023 and the 2016 Men's World Floorball Championships.
- The Rimi Olympic Centre has hosted the 2016 Men's World Floorball Championships and 2021 as secondary arenas. The venue is also the home court for several basketball teams.

Venues in Latvia
Riga	UEFA Futsal Euro 2026 bidding process is located in Latvia	Riga
Xiaomi Arena	UEFA Futsal Euro 2026 bidding process is located in Latvia	Rimi Olympic Centre
Capacity: 9,975	UEFA Futsal Euro 2026 bidding process is located in Latvia	Capacity: 6,200

=== Lithuania ===
On 17 December 2022, Lithuania decided to apply to become the hosts. Lithuania have never hosted this tournament but did hold the 2021 FIFA Futsal World Cup. Lithuanian Football Federation general secretary, Edgaras Stankevičius said:

“In recent years, Lithuania has proven that futsal is becoming an important part of the development of our football – the selection stages of the men’s and women’s championships were held in our country more than once, not to mention the 2021 FIFA Futsal World Cup. During it, we gained great experience and we believe that it will help to properly organize the European Futsal Championship. It is true that we still have a lot of work to do before we succeed.”

In June 2023, after a meeting with UEFA president Aleksander Čeferin, Edgaras Stankevičius said Lithuania's had a good chance of winning. Lithuania's solo bid ended once they merged their bid with Latvia's.

==== Overview of venues ====
- The Žalgiris Arena in Kaunas is the largest arena in the Baltics. The venue has held EuroBasket 2011 and the 2021 FIFA Futsal World Cup.
- The Twinsbet Arena in Vilnius has hosted EuroBasket 2011 and the 2021 FIFA Futsal World Cup. Plus, numerous high-profile concerts have taken place here.

Venues in Lithuania
Kaunas	UEFA Futsal Euro 2026 bidding process is located in Lithuania	Vilnius
Žalgiris Arena	UEFA Futsal Euro 2026 bidding process is located in Lithuania	Twinsbet Arena
Capacity: 15,415	UEFA Futsal Euro 2026 bidding process is located in Lithuania	Capacity: 10,000

== Host announcement ==
On 2 December 2023, Latvia and Lithuania were awarded the hosting rights in Hamburg, Germany. This marks the first time the Futsal Euro is co-hosted and the first UEFA tournament to have three nations hosting (excluding UEFA Euro 2020 as twelve cities across Europe hosted the event). This will also be the first time a senior UEFA national team tournament is held in the Baltics.

=== Slovenia added as a co-host ===
However, problems emerged with the hosting arrangement after Belarus qualified, with neither country willing to host them due to the Russo-Ukrainian war. UEFA was supposed to make a decision in May 2025 but it was delayed. On 27 June 2025, Slovenia were added as a third co-host, with two venues in Ljubljana. The plan was approved by the Slovenian government as well. Belarus and Kazakhstan also stated an interest in hosting the event. The arrangement is very similar to the India and Pakistan cricket arrangement where neither side can play a world cup in the other country, so a neutral venue has to be found. Arena Stožice and Tivoli Arena have been selected by Slovenia.

Regarding the announcement of Slovenia becoming hosts, Slovenian Football Association president, Radenko Mijatović, said:

"We are delighted that the largest European futsal competition is returning to Slovenia. In 2018, we showed that we know how to organize a top tournament, and I am confident that we will confirm this this time as well."

==== Overview of venues ====
- Ljubljana's Arena Stožice is Slovenia's biggest arena. Built in 2010, it has since hosted EuroBasket 2013, UEFA Futsal Euro 2018, 2019 Men's European Volleyball Championship, 2022 FIVB Men's Volleyball World Championship, 2022 European Women's Handball Championship and EuroBasket Women 2023.
- The Tivoli Arena in Ljubljana has organised the 2004 European Men's Handball Championship and EuroBasket 2013. Before Slovenian independence, it also held various championships as Yugoslavia. The facility is primarily used for ice hockey.

Venues in Slovenia
Ljubljana	UEFA Futsal Euro 2026 bidding process is located in Slovenia	Ljubljana
Arena Stožice	UEFA Futsal Euro 2026 bidding process is located in Slovenia	Tivoli Arena
Capacity: 12,480	UEFA Futsal Euro 2026 bidding process is located in Slovenia	Capacity: 4,500
