= 2022 UEFA Under-19 Futsal Championship qualification =

Tournament details
- Dates: 1 November 2021 – 10 July 2022
- Teams: 33 (from 1 confederation)

Tournament statistics
- Matches played: 41
- Goals scored: 250 (6.1 per match)
- All statistics correct as of 8 July 2022.

The 2022 UEFA Under-19 Futsal Championship qualifying competition will be a men's under-19 futsal competition to determine the seven teams joining the automatically qualified hosts Spain in the 2022 UEFA Under-19 Futsal Championship final tournament. Players born on or after 1 January 2002 are eligible to participate.

== Teams ==
Apart from Spain, a total of 33 (out of 54) UEFA member national teams entered the qualifying stage. They are seeded on the basis of the associations' results in the 2018/19 competition.

The 26 highest-ranked teams entered the main round, while the 7 lowest-ranked teams entered the preliminary round. The coefficient ranking was also used for seeding in the preliminary round and main round draws, where each team was assigned a seeding position according to their ranking for the respective draw.

Final tournament hosts
Team	Coeff	Rank
Spain	7.000	1

Teams entering Preliminary Round

Pot 1 (Hosts)
Team	Coeff	Rank	Position
San Marino	0.000	31	1
Gibraltar	0.000	33	3 & 4

Pot 2 (seeding position 4 or 3)
Team	Coeff	Rank
Estonia	0.000	32
Wales	0.000	34

Pot 3 (seeding position 2)
Team	Coeff	Rank
Montenegro	0.167	30

Pot 4 (seeding position 1)
Team	Coeff	Rank
North Macedonia	1.000	28
Andorra	0.667	29

Teams entering Main Round

Pot 1 (Hosts)
Team	Coeff	Rank	Position
Croatia	5.333	2	1
Portugal	5.000	3	1
Ukraine	3.333	6	1
Turkey	2.333	11	2
Romania	1.667	18	3
Finland	1.667	19	3
Serbia	1.333	24	4

Pot 2 (seeding position 4)
Team	Coeff	Rank
Greece	1.417	23
Georgia	1.000	25
Kazakhstan	1.000	26
Azerbaijan	1.000	27

Pot 3 (seeding position 3)
Team	Coeff	Rank
Latvia	2.000	16
Cyprus	1.833	17
Italy	1.667	20
Hungary	1.667	21
Moldova	1.667	22

Pot 4 (seeding position 2)
Team	Coeff	Rank
Belgium	2.333	9
France	2.333	10
Slovakia	2.333	12
Bosnia and Herzegovina	2.000	13
Czech Republic	2.000	14
Belarus	2.000	15

Pot 5 (seeding position 1)
Team	Coeff	Rank
Poland	4.667	4
Russia	3.333	5
Netherlands	3.000	7
Slovenia	2.333	8

== Format ==
In the preliminary round and main round, each group is played as a round-robin mini-tournament at the pre-selected hosts.

=== Tiebreakers ===
In the preliminary round and main round, teams are ranked according to points (3 points for a win, 1 point for a draw, 0 points for a loss), and if tied on points, the following tiebreaking criteria are applied, in the order given, to determine the rankings (Regulations Articles 14.01 and 14.02):

1. Points in head-to-head matches among tied teams;
2. Goal difference in head-to-head matches among tied teams;
3. Goals scored in head-to-head matches among tied teams;
4. If more than two teams are tied, and after applying all head-to-head criteria above, a subset of teams are still tied, all head-to-head criteria above are reapplied exclusively to this subset of teams;
5. Goal difference in all group matches;
6. Goals scored in all group matches;
7. Penalty shoot-out if only two teams have the same number of points, and they met in the last round of the group and are tied after applying all criteria above (not used if more than two teams have the same number of points, or if their rankings are not relevant for qualification for the next stage);
8. Disciplinary points (red card = 3 points, yellow card = 1 point, expulsion for two yellow cards in one match = 3 points);
9. UEFA coefficient for the qualifying round draw;

== Preliminary round ==
The winners of each group advance to main round to join the 26 teams which receive byes to main round.

Times are CET (UTC+1), as listed by UEFA (local times, if different, are in parentheses).

=== Group A ===
Pos	Team	Pld	W	D	L	GF	GA	GD	Pts	Qualification
1	Andorra	3	3	0	0	14	4	+10	9	Main round
2	Wales	3	1	1	1	15	8	+7	4	
3	San Marino (H)	3	1	0	2	3	16	−13	3	
4	Estonia	3	0	1	2	7	11	−4	1	

Source: UEFA
Rules for classification: Qualifying tiebreakers
(H) Hosts
3 November 2021
16:00

Andorra	3–2	Wales
Blat 1:40; Guirao 12:31; Albino 39:57	Report	Lyon 4:47; Perkins 31:12

Multieventi Sport Domus, Serravalle
Attendance: 27
Referee: Ademir Avdic (Sweden)
3 November 2021
19:00

San Marino	2–1	Estonia
Tonini 25:37; Cecchini 32:34	Report	Väin 2:57

Multieventi Sport Domus, Serravalle
Attendance: 100
Referee: Martin Matula (Slovakia)

4 November 2021
16:00

Andorra	4–1	Estonia
Jeansou 6:29; Raužin 22:54 (o.g.); Manchado 31:44; Mansegosa 36:11	Report	Vdovin 15:28

Multieventi Sport Domus, Serravalle
Attendance: 21
Referee: Turekhan Tursumbayev (Kazakhstan)
4 November 2021
19:00

San Marino	0–8	Wales
	Report	Lyon 5:20; Morris 21:09; Zanotti 22:27 (o.g.); Thomas 22:50, 29:22, 39:30; Owen 25:51; Perkins 37:54

Multieventi Sport Domus, Serravalle
Attendance: 120
Referee: Igor Puzović (Bosnia and Herzegovina)

6 November 2021
15:00

Wales	5–5	Estonia
Edwards 3:10; Lyon 11:03; Thomas 13:06; Perkins 23:54; Rollason 32:41	Report	Vendelin 4:08; Karu 10:04; Filin 22:00; Raužin 29:05; Timoska 35:38

Multieventi Sport Domus, Serravalle
Attendance: 42
Referee: Turekhan Tursumbayev (Kazakhstan)
6 November 2021
18:00

Andorra	7–1	San Marino
Albino 0:50; Manchado 3:40, 16:38, 29:24; Torres 7:29; Jeansou 34:40; Blat 38:43	Report	Cecchini 6:50

Multieventi Sport Domus, Serravalle
Attendance: 110
Referee: Igor Puzović (Bosnia and Herzegovina)

=== Group B ===
Pos	Team	Pld	W	D	L	GF	GA	GD	Pts	Qualification
1	Montenegro	2	2	0	0	8	3	+5	6	Main round
2	North Macedonia	2	1	0	1	4	4	0	3	
3	Gibraltar (H)	2	0	0	2	5	10	−5	0	

Source: UEFA
Rules for classification: Qualifying tiebreakers
(H) Hosts
1 November 2021
19:00

Gibraltar	3–6	Montenegro
Guerra 8:38; El Yettefti 10:18; Smith 35:40	Report	Lolović 22:58; Vukčević 25:29; Tafić 27:30, 34:13; Lješković 27:40, 32:03

Tercentenary Sports Hall, Gibraltar
Referee: Josip Dujmic (Croatia)

2 November 2021
17:00

North Macedonia	0–2	Montenegro
	Report	Tafić 24:59; Lješković 35:54

Tercentenary Sports Hall, Gibraltar
Referee: Liviu Dumitru Chita (Romania)

3 November 2021
19:00

North Macedonia	4–2	Gibraltar
Janev 4:54; Anchevski 7:22; Blazhevski 21:51; Chajani 35:21	Report	El Yettefti 4:02; Marrache 37:00

Tercentenary Sports Hall, Gibraltar
Referee: Daniel Stauber (Austria)

== Main round ==
The winners of each group advance to the final tournament.

Times are CET/CEST, (Note: CET (UTC+1) for dates up to 27 March 2022, and CEST (UTC+2) for dates thereafter.) as listed by UEFA (local times, if different, are in parentheses).

=== Group 1 ===
Pos	Team	Pld	W	D	L	GF	GA	GD	Pts	Qualification
1	Italy	3	3	0	0	10	5	+5	9	Final tournament
2	Turkey (H)	3	1	1	1	10	9	+1	4	
3	Montenegro	3	1	0	2	4	6	−2	3	
4	Netherlands	3	0	1	2	5	9	−4	1	

Source: UEFA
Rules for classification: Qualifying tiebreakers
(H) Hosts
16 March 2022
11:00 (13:00 TRT)

Italy	5–3	Turkey
Isgro' 6:39; Scavino 10:46; Henz Oechsler 21:37; De Felice 29:34; Pazetti 35:19	Report	Eliaçık 17:59, 36:11; Yildiz 23:34

Lütfullah Aksungur Sports Hall, Adana
Attendance: 440
Referee: Aslan Galayev (Kazakhstan)
16 March 2022
14:00 (16:00 TRT)

Netherlands	0–3	Montenegro
	Report	Puletić 4:04, 22:48; Petrušić 20:06

Lütfullah Aksungur Sports Hall, Adana
Attendance: 50
Referee: Michael Christofides (Cyprus)

17 March 2022
11:00 (13:00 TRT)

Turkey	4–1	Montenegro
Yildiz 11:08; Akbaş 27:43; Berkan Keskin 28:39; Varlık 30:42	Report	Tafić 21:11

Lütfullah Aksungur Sports Hall, Adana
Attendance: 400
Referee: Antonios Adamopoulos (Greece)
17 March 2022
14:00 (16:00 TRT)

Italy	3–2	Netherlands
Ansaloni 2:31; Vagevuur 9:38 (o.g.); Pieri 22:21	Report	Kee 37:58; Koel 38:49

Lütfullah Aksungur Sports Hall, Adana
Attendance: 50
Referee: Besart Ismajli (Kosovo)

19 March 2022
11:00 (13:00 TRT)

Turkey	3–3	Netherlands
Berkan Keskin 4:34; Eliaçık 29:11; Yildiz 36:32	Report	Zariouh 20:26; Kee 21:35, 28:55

Lütfullah Aksungur Sports Hall, Adana
Attendance: 232
Referee: Michael Christofides (Cyprus)
19 March 2022
14:00 (16:00 TRT)

Montenegro	0–2	Italy
	Report	Isgro' 7:21; Mentasti 27:20

Lütfullah Aksungur Sports Hall, Adana
Attendance: 50
Referee: Antonios Adamopoulos (Greece)

=== Group 2 ===
Pos	Team	Pld	W	D	L	GF	GA	GD	Pts	Qualification
1	Portugal (H)	3	3	0	0	27	3	+24	9	Final tournament
2	Czech Republic	3	1	1	1	8	6	+2	4	
3	Greece	3	0	2	1	3	9	−6	2	
4	Cyprus	3	0	1	2	2	22	−20	1	

Source: UEFA
Rules for classification: Qualifying tiebreakers
(H) Hosts
17 March 2022
16:00 (15:00 GMT)

Czech Republic	1–1	Greece
Knobloch 3:33	Report	Grigorakos 39:26

Pavilhão Municipal de Desportos de Vila do Conde, Vila do Conde
Attendance: 50
Referee: Telmen Undrakh (Norway)
17 March 2022
19:00 (18:00 GMT)

Cyprus	0–16	Portugal
	Report	Tiago Macedo 0:09, 34:28; Rocha 0:48, 23:31, 31:10; Freire 14:25, 39:17; Sa 22:31, 27:21; Daniel Monteiro 29:54, 32:19, 37:48; Tavares Furtado 32:07; Moreira 37:13; Teixeira 39:39, 39:55

Pavilhão Municipal de Desportos de Vila do Conde, Vila do Conde
Attendance: 500
Referee: Zviad Bliadze (Georgia)

18 March 2022
16:00 (15:00 GMT)

Cyprus	0–4	Czech Republic
	Report	Knobloch 7:23; Habart 22:54; Vik 26:25; Perina 36:48

Pavilhão Municipal de Desportos de Vila do Conde, Vila do Conde
Attendance: 50
Referee: Giovanni Zannola (Italy)
18 March 2022
19:00 (18:00 GMT)

Portugal	6–0	Greece
Freire 13:57; Teixeira 17:23; Moreira 18:13; Tiago Macedo 26:24; Ribeiro 32:09; Rocha 36:16	Report

Pavilhão Municipal de Desportos de Vila do Conde, Vila do Conde
Attendance: 520
Referee: Liviu Dumitru Chita (Romania)

20 March 2022
17:00 (16:00 GMT)

Greece	2–2	Cyprus
Tsepas 6:58; Soulis 25:34	Report	Constantinou 39:34, 39:57

Pavilhão Municipal de Desportos de Vila do Conde, Vila do Conde
Attendance: 100
Referee: Giovanni Zannola (Italy)
20 March 2022
20:00 (19:00 GMT)

Portugal	5–3	Czech Republic
Tavares Furtado 7:42; Rocha 15:19; Moreira 16:39; Teixeira 19:51; Simão 30:20	Report	Vojtíšek 18:45; Džuba 20:14; Vik 32:04

Pavilhão Municipal de Desportos de Vila do Conde, Vila do Conde
Attendance: 1,097
Referee: Liviu Dumitru Chita (Romania)

=== Group 3 ===
Pos	Team	Pld	W	D	L	GF	GA	GD	Pts	Qualification
1	France	3	2	1	0	11	2	+9	7	Final tournament
2	Serbia (H)	3	2	0	1	10	7	+3	6	
3	Slovenia	3	1	1	1	6	6	0	4	
4	Hungary	3	0	0	3	2	14	−12	0	

Source: UEFA
Rules for classification: Qualifying tiebreakers
(H) Hosts
16 March 2022
16:00

France	4–0	Serbia
Diop 6:11, 38:57; Alla 11:23; Faytre 34:21	Report

Sports Hall Vlade Divac, Vrnjačka Banja
Referee: Moshe Bohbot (Israel)
16 March 2022
19:30

Slovenia	2–1	Hungary
Rajter 23:57; Goznik 27:54	Report	Szalmás 36:26

Sports Hall Vlade Divac, Vrnjačka Banja
Referee: Radim Cep (Czech Republic)

17 March 2022
16:00

France	1–1	Slovenia
Gazengel 6:40	Report	Trdin 8:54

Sports Hall Vlade Divac, Vrnjačka Banja
Referee: Eduards Fatkulins (Latvia)
17 March 2022
19:30

Serbia	6–0	Hungary
Živanović 12:43, 21:45; Marjanović 15:30; Paunović 18:10; Ćirka 27:44; Kovács 33:09 (o.g)	Report

Sports Hall Vlade Divac, Vrnjačka Banja
Referee: Christian Gundler (Germany)

19 March 2022
16:00

Hungary	1–6	France
Szatmári 32:34	Report	Szatmári 2:27; Faytre 12:18; Niakate 16:34, 19:51; Diop 27:17, 34:35

Sports Hall Vlade Divac, Vrnjačka Banja
Referee: Moshe Bohbot (Israel)
19 March 2022
19:30

Serbia	4–3	Slovenia
Tomić 5:19; Paunović 14:32, 16:02; Živanović 18:19	Report	Frank 20:17; Rajter 37:09; Ruis 38:51

Sports Hall Vlade Divac, Vrnjačka Banja
Referee: Radim Cep (Czech Republic)

=== Group 4 ===
Pos	Team	Pld	W	D	L	GF	GA	GD	Pts	Qualification
1	Poland	3	2	0	1	12	9	+3	6 (Note: Poland ahead on goal difference in head-to-head matches: Poland +2, Bosnia and Herzegovina 0, Finland –2.)	Final tournament
2	Bosnia and Herzegovina	3	2	0	1	9	8	+1	6	
3	Finland (H)	3	2	0	1	14	10	+4	6	
4	Kazakhstan	3	0	0	3	7	15	−8	0	

Source: UEFA
Rules for classification: Qualifying tiebreakers
(H) Hosts
Notes:
15 March 2022
12:00 (13:00 EET)

Poland	3–2	Kazakhstan
Sendlewski 14:17; Urgenishbayev 26:10 (o.g.); Golubnichiy 28:42 (o.g.)	Report	Buldin 6:21, 35:30

Delfort Areena, Janakkala
Referee: Stephen Vella (Malta)
15 March 2022
18:00 (19:00 EET)

Bosnia and Herzegovina	1–3	Finland
Todorić 38:33	Report	Kohonen 14:30; Niemelä 21:52; Seppälä 27:20

Delfort Areena, Janakkala
Referee: Nikola Rabrenović (Serbia)

16 March 2022
12:00 (13:00 EET)

Bosnia and Herzegovina	3–1	Poland
Brkanić 11:00; Radujković 30:17; Kasalo 32:43	Report	Roll 6:46

Delfort Areena, Janakkala
Referee: Ruben António Cardoso (Portugal)
16 March 2022
18:00 (19:00 EET)

Finland	7–1	Kazakhstan
Kaikkola 7:31, 17:29; Bauyrzhanuly 9:08 (o.g.); Kaivola 9:18; Niemelä 17:12; Pekki 19:14; Paappanen 38:02	Report	Kim 28:41

Delfort Areena, Janakkala
Referee: Valentin Ciuplea (Wales)

18 March 2022
12:00 (13:00 EET)

Kazakhstan	4–5	Bosnia and Herzegovina
Bauyrzhanuly 1:18; Karmenov 9:49; Kim 21:37; Čovrk 26:04 (o.g.)	Report	Čovrk 2:24; Kasalo 10:06, 17:12; Todorić 32:34; Krezo 39:50

Delfort Areena, Janakkala
Referee: Valentin Ciuplea (Wales)
18 March 2022
18:00 (19:00 EET)

Finland	4–8	Poland
Kohonen 12:38; Kaikkola 29:27, 38:51; Niemelä 37:04	Report	Sendlewski 6:52, 15:38, 36:47, 39:40; Formela 15:03, 21:01, 33:02; Mazur 38:44

Delfort Areena, Janakkala
Referee: Ruben António Cardoso (Portugal)

=== Group 5 ===
Pos	Team	Pld	W	D	L	GF	GA	GD	Pts	Qualification
1	Romania (H)	2	2	0	0	7	2	+5	6	Final tournament
2	Slovakia	2	1	0	1	4	6	−2	3	
3	Georgia	2	0	0	2	4	7	−3	0	
4	Russia	0	0	0	0	0	0	0	0	Suspended (Note: On 28 February 2022, UEFA suspended Russian clubs and national teams from all competitions due to the Russian invasion of Ukraine.)

Updated to match(es) played on 17 March 2022. Source: UEFA
Rules for classification: Qualifying tiebreakers
(H) Hosts
Notes:
16 March 2022
17:30 (18:30 EET)

Georgia	2–3	Romania
Kurtsadze 3:47; Giorgadze 4:11	Report	Csog 10:25; Nagy 16:37; Kurtsadze 34:03 (o.g.)

City Hall Arena, Târgu Mureș
Attendance: 385
Referee: Damian Grabowski (Poland)

17 March 2022
17:30 (18:30 EET)

Slovakia	4–2	Georgia
Tkeshelashvili 24:25 (o.g.); Jančula 26:00; Rusnák 27:16; Kollar 38:35	Report	Kurtsadze 19:42; Giorgadze 31:23

City Hall Arena, Târgu Mureș
Attendance: 147
Referee: Panagiotis Ntalas (Greece)

18 March 2022
17:30 (18:30 EET)

Romania	4–0	Slovakia
Trifa 23:22; Nagy 24:26; Barbocz 26:56; David 32:13	Report

City Hall Arena, Târgu Mureș
Attendance: 585
Referee: Damian Grabowski (Poland)

=== Group 6 ===
Pos	Team	Pld	W	D	L	GF	GA	GD	Pts	Qualification
1	Ukraine	3	3	0	0	26	2	+24	9	Final tournament
2	Belgium	3	2	0	1	9	13	−4	6	
3	Andorra	3	1	0	2	9	17	−8	3	
4	Moldova (H)	3	0	0	3	4	16	−12	0	

Updated to match(es) played on 8 July 2022. Source: UEFA
Rules for classification: Qualifying tiebreakers
(H) Hosts
7 July 2022
14:00 (15:00 EEST)

Belgium	6–0	Moldova
De Kerf 3:56, 14:37, 29:30; Jacobs 11:01, 25:21; Morando 26:30	Report

FMF Futsal Arena, Ciorescu
Referee: Ruben António Cardoso Santos (Portugal)
7 July 2022
17:00 (18:00 EEST)

Ukraine	10–2	Andorra
Lutai 15:27, 28:25; Dychuk 16:05, 33:42; Brytan 16:15, 26:35, 34:08; Tkachuk 23:25, 38:41; Smetanenko 27:54	Report	Villalta Perez 20:15; Adrià Blat 20:55

FMF Futsal Arena, Ciorescu
Referee: Farik Keco (Bosnia and Herzegovina)

8 July 2022
14:00 (15:00 EEST)

Belgium	0-11	Ukraine
	Report	Kalashnyk 05:57; Kvasnii 08:48; Brytan 13:20, 17:36, 31:44; Dychuk 17:55; Tkachuk 18:05; Skybchyk 23:17; Malynovskyi 28:31; Smetanenko 38:39, 39:23

FMF Futsal Arena, Ciorescu
Referee: Daniel Deca (Romania)
8 July 2022
17:00 (18:00 EEST)

Moldova	4-5	Andorra
Crasilov 14:48; Cucos 22:55; Chiriac 25:28; Bestanco 26:02	Report	Manchado Novus 00:48, 18:07; Torres Domenjo 04:58, 23:29; Villalta Perez 24:16

FMF Futsal Arena, Ciorescu
Referee: Marco Rothenfluh (Swiss)

10 July 2022
14:00 (15:00 EEST)

Andorra	2-3	Belgium
Villalta Perez 22:34; Jeansou Ache 39:26	Report	Vandenplas 15:45; Morando. 17:01; El Hari 33:40

FMF Futsal Arena, Ciorescu
Referee: Farik Keco (Bosnia and Herzegovina)
10 July 2022
17:00 (18:00 EEST)

Moldova	0–5	Ukraine
	Report

FMF Futsal Arena, Ciorescu
Referee: Daniel Deca (Romania)

=== Group 7 ===
Pos	Team	Pld	W	D	L	GF	GA	GD	Pts	Qualification
1	Croatia (H)	2	2	0	0	11	5	+6	6	Final tournament
2	Latvia	2	1	0	1	8	6	+2	3	
3	Azerbaijan	2	0	0	2	2	10	−8	0	
4	Belarus	0	0	0	0	0	0	0	0	Withdrew

Source: UEFA
Rules for classification: Qualifying tiebreakers
(H) Hosts
17 March 2022
17:00

Azerbaijan	1–6	Croatia
Rahimov 24:38	Report	Sušac 1:12, 32:50; Josipović 6:53; Cigler 9:36; Dragičević 10:51; Hrgota 22:43

Mladost, Karlovac
Referee: Pablo Delgado (Spain)

18 March 2022
17:00

Latvia	4–1	Azerbaijan
Tarakanovs 8:32; Mickēvičs 24:44; Puzikovs 27:32; Fogels 32:22	Report	Mammadzada 34:49

Mladost, Karlovac
Referee: Michael Lima De Sousa (Luxembourg)

19 March 2022
17:00

Croatia	5–4	Latvia
Đurković 9:45; Čičić 17:13; Vrdoljak 18:14; Dragičević 24:06; Govorko 38:12	Report	Lasić 17:51 (o.g.); Jelagovs 21:11; Fogels 32:51; Grīslis 34:58

Mladost, Karlovac
Referee: Talgat Kosmukhambetov (Kazakhstan)

== Qualified teams ==
The following eight teams qualify for the final tournament.

Team	Qualified as	Qualified on	Previous appearances in Under-19 Futsal Euro^{1}
Spain	Hosts	20 April 2021	1 (**2019**)
Poland	Main round Group 4 winners	18 March 2022	1 (2019)
Romania	Main round Group 5 winners	18 March 2022	0 (debut)
Italy	Main round Group 1 winners	19 March 2022	0 (debut)
France	Main round Group 3 winners	19 March 2022	0 (debut)
Croatia	Main round Group 7 winners	19 March 2022	1 (2019)
Portugal	Main round Group 2 winners	20 March 2022	1 (2019)
Ukraine	Main round Group 6 winners	8 July 2022	1 (2019)

^{1} Bold indicates champions for that year. Italic indicates hosts for that year.
