= 2022 UEFA Under-19 Futsal Championship =

Tournament details
- Host country: Spain
- City: Jaén
- Dates: 3–10 September
- Teams: 8 (from 1 confederation)
- Venue: 1 (in 1 host city)

Final positions
- Champions: Spain (2nd title)
- Runners-up: Portugal

Tournament statistics
- Matches played: 15
- Goals scored: 99 (6.6 per match)
- Attendance: 10,630 (709 per match)
- Top scorer(s): (Spain) Nicolás Marrón (Spain) Pablo Ordoñez (5 goals each)

The 2022 UEFA Under-19 Futsal Championship (also known as UEFA Under-19 Futsal Euro 2022) was the second edition of the UEFA Under-19 Futsal Championship, the biennial international youth futsal championship organised by UEFA for the men's under-19 national teams of Europe. The tournament was originally scheduled to be held between 1 and 7 November 2021, but the competition was postponed to 3 to 10 September 2022 due to the COVID-19 pandemic. The tournament was held at the Olivo Arena in Jaén, Spain.

A total of eight teams played in the final tournament, with players born on or after 1 January 2002 eligible to participate. Spain were the defending champions.

They defended the title with a 6–2 win after extra time against Portugal.

== Host selection ==
The following associations had confirmed their plan to bid:

- Lithuania

The hosts were originally to be confirmed by the UEFA Executive Committee on 3 December 2020. However, the decision was delayed. On 19 April 2021, the UEFA Executive Committee appointed the Olivo Arena in Jaén, Spain as the tournament host.

== Qualification ==
Seven teams qualified to join the hosts in the final tournament. The qualifying draw was originally to be held on 23 October 2020, but was postponed to 7 July 2021. The preliminary round was originally to be held between 12 and 17 January 2021, and the main round was originally to be held between 23 and 28 March 2021. However, this was postponed due to the COVID-19 pandemic in Europe, and rescheduled to 2–7 November 2021 for the preliminary round, and 15–20 March 2022 for the main round.

Team	Qualified as	Qualified on	Previous appearances in Under-19 Futsal Euro^{1}
Spain	Hosts	20 April 2021	1 (**2019**)
Poland	Main round Group 4 winners	18 March 2022	1 (2019)
Romania	Main round Group 5 winners	18 March 2022	0 (debut)
Italy	Main round Group 1 winners	19 March 2022	0 (debut)
France	Main round Group 3 winners	19 March 2022	0 (debut)
Croatia	Main round Group 7 winners	19 March 2022	1 (2019)
Portugal	Main round Group 2 winners	20 March 2022	1 (2019)
Ukraine	Main round Group 6 winners	8 July 2022	1 (2019)

^{1} Bold indicates champions for that year. Italic indicates hosts for that year.

== Squads ==
Each national team have to submit a squad of 14 players, two of whom must be goalkeepers.

== Group stage ==
The final tournament schedule was announced on 25 June 2022.

The final tournament draw was made on 14 July 2022 in Jaén.

The group winners and runners-up advance to the semi-finals

Tiebreakers

In the group stage, teams are ranked according to points (3 points for a win, 1 point for a draw, 0 points for a loss), and if tied on points, the following tiebreaking criteria are applied, in the order given, to determine the rankings (Regulations Articles 18.01 and 18.02):

1. Points in head-to-head matches among tied teams;
2. Goal difference in head-to-head matches among tied teams;
3. Goals scored in head-to-head matches among tied teams;
4. If more than two teams are tied, and after applying all head-to-head criteria above, a subset of teams are still tied, all head-to-head criteria above are reapplied exclusively to this subset of teams;
5. Goal difference in all group matches;
6. Goals scored in all group matches;
7. Penalty shoot-out if only two teams have the same number of points, and they met in the last round of the group and are tied after applying all criteria above (not used if more than two teams have the same number of points, or if their rankings are not relevant for qualification for the next stage);
8. Disciplinary points (red card = 3 points, yellow card = 1 point, expulsion for two yellow cards in one match = 3 points);
9. UEFA coefficient for the qualifying round draw;
10. Drawing of lots.

=== Group A ===
Pos	Team	Pld	W	D	L	GF	GA	GD	Pts	Qualification
1	Spain (H)	3	2	1	0	22	3	+19	7	Knockout stage
2	Ukraine	3	2	1	0	13	8	+5	7	Knockout stage
3	Croatia	3	1	0	2	13	17	−4	3	
4	Romania	3	0	0	3	2	22	−20	0	

Source: UEFA
Rules for classification: Group stage tiebreakers
(H) Hosts
4 September 2022
13:30

Ukraine	6–4	Croatia
Dychuk 0:32; Malynovskyi 27:34; Kvasnii 27:44, 37:44; Semenchenko 30:28; Smetanenko 36:43	Report	Josipović 4:53; Pest-Mundvajl 7:45; Sušac 17:43 (pen.); Čičić 18:24

Olivo Arena, Jaén
Attendance: 148
Referee: Damian Grabowski (Poland), Viktor Bugenko (Moldova)
4 September 2022
21:00

Spain	9–0	Romania
Espín 6:28; Nicolás 11:14, 23:12; Ortas 14:46; Carrasco 19:32; Tapias 24:05; Nacho Gómez 26:09; Guido 32:55; Adrián Rivera 34:22	Report

Olivo Arena, Jaén
Attendance: 1,039
Referee: Ruben Cardoso (Portugal), Telmen Undrakh (Norway)

5 September 2022
16:00

Romania	2–5	Ukraine
Csog 20:24; Hegyi 33:54	Report	Semenchenko 08:59; Kvasnii 24:09, 28:15; Dychuk 28:47; Lutai 30:11

Olivo Arena, Jaén
Attendance: 188
Referee: Aslan Galayev (Kazakhstan), Giulio Colombin (Italy)
5 September 2022
21:00

Croatia	1–11	Spain
Cigler 17:00	Report	Pablo Ordóñez 2:35, 6:40, 24:36, 25:23; Nico 5:31; Moreno 8:27, 8.38'; Álex García 13:53, 31:32; Ortas 28:58, 37:48

Olivo Arena, Jaén
Attendance: 903
Referee: Ingus Puriņš (Latvia), Denys Kutsyi (Ukraine)

7 September 2022
13:30

Croatia	8–0	Romania
Sušac 6:41; Đurković 14:48; Dominik Čičić 15:43; Josipović 17:25; Lasić 19:29; Dragičević 32:19; Zorotović 37:58, 39:13	Report

Olivo Arena, Jaén
Attendance: 66
Referee: Telmen Undrakh (Norway), Ruben Cardoso (Portugal)
7 September 2022
21:00

Spain	2–2	Ukraine
Carrasco 22:57; Moreno 31:54	Report	Smetanenko 30:15; Oleksandr Dychuk 38:55

Olivo Arena, Jaén
Attendance: 991
Referee: Giulio Colombin (Italy), Aslan Galayev (Kazakhstan)

=== Group B ===
Pos	Team	Pld	W	D	L	GF	GA	GD	Pts	Qualification
1	Portugal	3	3	0	0	12	4	+8	9	Knockout stage
2	Poland	3	2	0	1	9	7	+2	6	Knockout stage
3	Italy	3	1	0	2	5	10	−5	3	
4	France	3	0	0	3	3	8	−5	0	

Source: UEFA
Rules for classification: Group stage tiebreakers
4 September 2022
16:00

Poland	2–4	Portugal
Roll 13:52, 32:38	Report	Furtado 01:35, 24:29; Tomás Colaço 23:43; Kutchy 30:25

Olivo Arena, Jaén
Attendance: 303
Referee: Peter Nurse (England), Marjan Mladenovski (North Macedonia)
4 September 2022
18:30

France	0–3	Italy
	Report	Capponi 06:30; Ansaloni 13:06; Pazetti 35:10 (pen.)

Olivo Arena, Jaén
Attendance: 675
Referee: Volha Pauliuts (Belarus), Trayan Enchev (Bulgaria)

5 September 2022
13:30

Italy	1–4	Poland
Scavino 39:42 (pen.)	Report	Sendlewski 10:46; Licznerski 19:37; Roll 36:50; Krzempek 39:12

Olivo Arena, Jaén
Attendance: 80
Referee: Rastislav Behancin (Slovakia), Javier Moreno Reina (Spain)
5 September 2022
18:30

Portugal	2–1	France
Rodrigo Simão 08:46; Diogo Santos 21:25	Report	Benslama 19:26 (pen.)

Olivo Arena, Jaén
Attendance: 472
Referee: Lars Van Leeuwen (Netherlands), Ozan Soykan (Turkey)

7 September 2022
16:00

Poland	3–2	France
Licznerski 16:08, 38:23; Sendlewski 17:23 (pen.)	Report	Dembele 2:05; Alla 31:23

Olivo Arena, Jaén
Attendance: 249
Referee: Marjan Mladenovski (North Macedonia), Ingus Puriņš (Latvia)
7 September 2022
18:30

Italy	1–6	Portugal
Lucas 28:28	Report	Lucas 0:41 (o.g.); Furtado 3:35, 22:05; Kutchy 11:03; Tomás Colaço 16:39; Pedro Santos 29:33

Olivo Arena, Jaén
Attendance: 563
Referee: Javier Moreno Reina (Spain), Denys Kutsyi (Ukraine)

== Knockout stage ==
In the knockout stage, extra time and penalty shoot-out are used to decide the winner if necessary.

=== Bracket ===
Semi-finals
8 September – Jaén
Portugal	4
Ukraine	1
8 September – Jaén
Spain (a.e.t)	5
Poland	2

Final
10 September – Jaén
Portugal	2
Spain (a.e.t)	6

=== Semi-finals ===
8 September 2022
18:00

Portugal	4–1	Ukraine
Diogo Santos 2:28; Tiago Velho 14:52; Rodrigo Simão 21:17; Kutchy 30:54	Report	Skybchyk 32:57

Olivo Arena, Jaén
Attendance: 680
Referee: Javier Moreno Reina (Spain), Peter Nurse (England)

8 September 2022
21:00

Spain	5–2 (a.e.t.)	Poland
Álex García 23:08; Adrián Rivera 23:22; Nico 42:48, 48:23; Carrasco 45:41	Report	Sendlewski 16:20 (pen.); Turkowyd 26:03

Olivo Arena, Jaén
Attendance: 1,206
Referee: Ruben Cardoso (Portugal). Denys Kutsyi (Ukraine)

=== Final ===
10 September 2022
19:00

Portugal	2–6 (a.e.t.)	Spain
Rúben Teixeira 6:43 (pen.); Ion Cerviño 37:46 (o.g.)	Report	Carrasco 1:02; Moreno 16:34; Álex García 41:28; Adrián Rivera 44:49; Ion Cerviño 46:52; Pablo Ordóñez 48:42

Olivo Arena, Jaén
Attendance: 3,067
Referee: Giulio Colombin (Italy), Telmen Undrakh (Norway), Denys Kutsyi (Ukraine), Peter Nurse (England), Marjan Mladenovski (North Macedonia)

== Goalscorers ==
5 goals

- (Spain) Nicolás Marrón
- (Spain) Pablo Ordoñez

4 goals

- (Portugal) Diego Furtado
- (Spain) Juan Moreno
- (Spain) Álex García
- (Spain) Jorge Carrasco
- (Ukraine) Yaroslav Kvasnii

3 goals

- (Poland) Kamil Roll
- (Poland) Szymon Licznerski
- (Poland) Kacper Sendlewski
- (Portugal) Kutchy
- (Spain) Albert Ortas
- (Spain) Adrián Rivera
- (Ukraine) Oleksandr Dychuk

2 goals

- (Croatia) Tonino Zorotović
- (Croatia) Romeo Sušac
- (Croatia) Filip Josipović
- (Croatia) Dominik Čičić
- (Portugal) Rodrigo Simão
- (Portugal) Diogo Santos
- (Portugal) Tomás Colaço
- (Ukraine) Rostyslav Semenchenko
- (Ukraine) Oleksandr Smetanenko

1 goal

- (Croatia) Marko Pest-Mundvajl
- (Croatia) Gabrijel Lasić
- (Croatia) Domagoj Đurković
- (Croatia) Duje Dragičević
- (Croatia) Lovro Cigler
- (France) Houmany Dembele
- (France) Sofiane Alla
- (France) Amin Benslama
- (Italy) Valerio Capponi
- (Italy) Tommaso Ansaloni
- (Italy) Gabriel Pazetti
- (Italy) Leonardo Scavino
- (Italy) Lucas
- (Poland) Miłosz Krzempek
- (Poland) Filip Turkowyd
- (Portugal) Pedro Santos
- (Portugal) Tiago Velho
- (Portugal) Rúben Teixeira
- (Romania) Janos-Csongor Csog
- (Romania) Attila Hegyi
- (Spain) Jorge Espín
- (Spain) Adrián Tapias
- (Spain) Nacho Gómez
- (Spain) Guido García Sánchez
- (Spain) Ion Cerviño
- (Ukraine) Maksym Malynovskyi
- (Ukraine) Sava Lutai
- (Ukraine) Dmytro Skybchyk

1 own goal

- (Italy) Lucas (playing against Portugal)
- (Spain) Ion Cerviño (playing against Portugal)

== Broadcasting ==
=== Television ===
All 15 matches will be live streamed in selected countries (including all unsold markets) and highlights are available for all territories around the world on UEFA.tv.

==== Participating nations ====
Country	Broadcaster
Spain (host)	RTVE
Croatia	Sport Klub
France	SportALL
Italy	RAI
Poland	TVP
Portugal	RTP
Romania	TVR
Ukraine	UA:PBC

==== Non-participating European nations ====
Country/Region	Broadcaster
Albania	RTSH
Andorra	RTVE (Spanish)
Armenia	APMTV
Austria	ORF
Other Balkan countries: Bosnia and Herzegovina; Macedonia; Montenegro; Serbia; Slovenia	Sport Klub
Belarus	Belteleradio
Belgium	VRT (Dutch); RTBF (French)
Luxembourg	VRT (Dutch); RTBF (French)
Bulgaria	BNT
Czech Republic	ČT
Denmark	DR
Faroe Islands	DR
Estonia	ERR
Finland	Yle
Germany	Sport1
Hungary	MTVA
Iceland	RÚV
Ireland	RTÉ
San Marino	RAI
Vatican City	RAI
Kosovo	RTK
Latvia	LTV
Liechtenstein	SRG SSR
Switzerland	SRG SSR
Lithuania	LRT
Malta	PBS
Netherlands	NOS
Norway	NRK
Russia	Match TV
Slovakia	RTVS
Sweden	SVT
Turkey	TRT
United Kingdom	BBC

==== Outside Europe ====
Country/Regional	Broadcaster
China	CCTV
Latin American countries: Argentina; Bolivia; Chile; Colombia; Costa Rica; Dominican Republic; Ecuador; El Salvador; Guatemala; Honduras; Mexico; Nicaragua; Panama; Paraguay; Peru; Puerto Rico; Uruguay; Venezuela	ESPN; Univision Deportes (Puerto Rico and USA only)
United States	ESPN; Univision Deportes (Puerto Rico and USA only)
MENA: Algeria; Bahrain; Chad; Comoros; Djibouti; Iran; Iraq; Jordan; Kuwait; Lebanon; Libya; Mauritania; Morocco; Oman; Qatar; Saudi Arabia; Somalia; Palestine; Sudan; Syria; Tunisia; United Arab Emirates; Yemen	beIN Sports
Other countries and territories: Anguilla; Antigua and Barbuda; The Bahamas; Barbados; Bermuda; British Virgin Islands; Cayman Islands; Cuba; Curacao; Falkland Islands; Grenada; Guadeloupe; Guyana; Haiti; Jamaica; Martinique; Montserrat; Nevis; Saint Kitts and Nevis; Saint Lucia; Saint Martin; Saint Pierre and Miquelon; Saint Vincent and the Grenadines; Suriname; Tortola; Trinidad and Tobago; Turks and Caicos Islands	ESPN

=== Radio ===
==== Participating nations ====
Country	Broadcaster
Spain (host)	RTVE
Croatia	CR
France	RF
Italy	RAI
Poland	PR
Portugal	RTP
Romania	RR
Ukraine	UA:PBC

==== Non-participating European nations ====
Country/Region	Broadcaster
Albania	RTSH
Andorra	RTVE (Spanish)
Armenia	HR
Austria	ORF
Belarus	Belteleradio
Belgium	VRT (Dutch); RTBF (French)
Luxembourg	VRT (Dutch); RTBF (French)
Bulgaria	BNR
Czech Republic	ČR
Denmark	DR
Faroe Islands	DR
Estonia	ERR
Finland	Yle
Germany	Sport1
Hungary	MTVA
Iceland	RÚV
Ireland	RTÉ
San Marino	RAI
Vatican City	RAI
Kosovo	RTK
Latvia	LR
Liechtenstein	SRG SSR
Switzerland	SRG SSR
Lithuania	LRT
Malta	PBS
Netherlands	NOS
Norway	NRK
Slovakia	RTVS
Sweden	SR
Turkey	TRT
United Kingdom	BBC

==== Outside Europe ====
Country/Regional	Broadcaster
China	CRI
Latin American countries: Argentina; Bolivia; Chile; Colombia; Costa Rica; Dominican Republic; Ecuador; El Salvador; Guatemala; Honduras; Mexico; Nicaragua; Panama; Paraguay; Peru; Puerto Rico; Uruguay; Venezuela	ESPN; Univision (Puerto Rico and USA only)
United States	ESPN; Univision (Puerto Rico and USA only)
