= 2026 Futsal Finalissima =

Tournament details
- Host country: Brazil
- City: Niterói
- Dates: 6–8 November
- Teams: 4 (from 2 confederations)
- Venue: 1 (in 1 host city)

Final positions
- Champions: Spain (1st title)
- Runners-up: Brazil
- Third place: Argentina
- Fourth place: Portugal

Tournament statistics
- Matches played: 4
- Goals scored: 13 (3.25 per match)
- Top scorer: (Portugal) Hugo Neves (2 goals)

The 2026 Futsal Finalissima (Spanish: Finalissima de Futsal 2026) was the second edition of the Futsal Finalissima, an international futsal championship organised by CONMEBOL and UEFA. It took place at the Arena Niterói in Niterói, Brazil, between 6 and 8 November 2026.

== Teams ==
The two-best teams from each confederation in their most recent continental tournament qualified for the tournament.

Team	Confederation	Qualified as
Brazil	CONMEBOL	2026 Copa América de Futsal winners
Argentina	CONMEBOL	2026 Copa América de Futsal runners-up
Spain	UEFA	UEFA Futsal Euro 2026 winners
Portugal	UEFA	UEFA Futsal Euro 2026 runners-up

== Venue ==
Niterói	Location map of the venue
Arena Niterói	Location map of the venue
Capacity: 2,600	Location map of the venue

On 17 August 2026, the Prefeitura Municipal de Niterói announced that the city of Niterói, in the state of Rio de Janeiro, would host the second edition of the Futsal Finalissima in November 2026. This was confirmed by both CONMEBOL and UEFA on 9 September 2026.

The tournament was held at the Arena Niterói, which had recently opened in June 2026 and is part of the Parque Poliesportivo da Concha Acústica sports complex, owned by the municipality of Niterói.

== Matches ==
The tournament featured two semi-finals, a third place play-off and a final. The semi-final fixtures were predetermined, with the South American sides facing off in one semifinal and the European sides in the other, in order to ensure that each confederation would have a representative in the final.

All times are local, ART (UTC−3).

=== Bracket ===
Semi-finals
6 November – Niterói
Brazil (p)	1 (5)
Argentina	1 (4)
6 November – Niterói
Spain (p)	2 (8)
Portugal	2 (7)

Final
8 November – Niterói
Brazil	0
Spain	3
Third place play-off
8 November – Niterói
Argentina	3
Portugal	1

=== Semi-finals ===
6 November 2026
18:30

Spain	2–2	Portugal
Raya 20'16"; González 39'05"	Report	Teixeira 26'09"; Hugo Neves 32'36"
Penalties
Pérez (penalty scored); Adolfo (penalty scored); Rivillos (penalty scored); Santa Cruz (penalty scored); Rivera (penalty missed); González (penalty scored); Cecilio (penalty scored); Plana (penalty scored); Mayor (penalty scored)	8–7	(penalty scored) André Coelho; (penalty scored) Tomás Paçó; (penalty missed) Pany Varela; (penalty scored) Hugo Neves; (penalty scored) Diogo Santos; (penalty scored) Teixeira; (penalty scored) Kutchy; (penalty scored) Afonso Jesus; (penalty missed) Lúcio Jr

Arena Niterói, Niterói
Referee: Daniel Manrique (Colombia), Yuri García (Colombia)

6 November 2026
21:30

Brazil	1–1	Argentina
Pito 32'14"	Report	Tripodi 34'06"
Penalties
Neguinho (penalty scored); Vinícius (penalty scored); Marcel (penalty scored); Dyego (penalty scored); Fabinho (penalty scored)	5–4	(penalty scored) Bolo; (penalty scored) Plaza; (penalty scored) Claudino; (penalty scored) Rosa; (penalty missed) Tripodi

Arena Niterói, Niterói
Referee: Bill Villalba (Paraguay), José Ocampo (Paraguay)

=== Third place play-off ===
8 November 2025
14:30

Argentina	3–1	Portugal
Altamirano 0'11"; Tomás Paçó 33'54" (o.g.); Bolo 33'54"	Report	Hugo Neves 21'58"

Arena Niterói, Niterói
Referee: Leonel Ruales (Ecuador), Jonnathan Herbas (Ecuador)

=== Final ===
8 November 2026
17:30

Brazil	0–3	Spain
	Report	Castejón 31'39"; Cecilio 38'22"; Pérez 39'59"

Arena Niterói, Niterói
Referee: Daniel Rodríguez (Uruguay), Andrés Martínez (Uruguay)

== Goalscorers ==
There were 13 goals scored in 4 matches, for an average of 3.25 goals per match.

2 goals

- (Portugal) Hugo Neves

1 goal

- (Argentina) Leandro Altamirano
- (Argentina) Lucas Bolo
- (Argentina) Lucas Tripodi
- (Brazil) Pito
- (Portugal) Rúben Teixeira
- (Spain) Gonzalo Castejón
- (Spain) Sergio González
- (Spain) Cecilio Morales
- (Spain) Antonio Pérez
- (Spain) José Raya

1 own goal

- (Portugal) Tomás Paçó (against Argentina)
