= 2019 UEFA Under-19 Futsal Championship qualification =

Tournament details
- Dates: 22 January – 30 March 2019
- Teams: 34 (from 1 confederation)

Tournament statistics
- Matches played: 54
- Goals scored: 339 (6.28 per match)
- Top scorer(s): (Belgium) Qendrim Bakija (Cyprus) Mamas Loizou (7 goals each)

The 2019 UEFA Under-19 Futsal Championship qualifying competition was a men's under-19 futsal competition that determined the seven teams joining the automatically qualified hosts Latvia in the 2019 UEFA Under-19 Futsal Championship final tournament. Players born on or after 1 January 2000 were eligible to participate.

== Teams ==
Apart from Latvia, a total of 34 (out of 54) UEFA member national teams entered the qualifying stage. They are seeded according to the coefficient ranking of their men's senior national teams, calculated based on the following:

- UEFA Futsal Euro 2016 final tournament and qualifying competition
- 2016 FIFA Futsal World Cup final tournament and qualifying competition
- UEFA Futsal Euro 2018 final tournament and qualifying competition

The 26 highest-ranked teams entered the main round, while the 8 lowest-ranked teams entered the preliminary round. The coefficient ranking was also used for seeding in the preliminary round and main round draws, where each team was assigned a seeding position according to their ranking for the respective draw. One team was pre-selected as hosts for the preliminary round (the hosts of Group B to be confirmed by 9 November 2018) and seven teams were pre-selected as hosts for the main round.

The draws for the preliminary round and main round were held on 1 November 2018, 14:00 CET (UTC+1), at the UEFA headquarters in Nyon, Switzerland. The mechanism of the draws for each round is as follows:

- In the preliminary round, the eight teams were drawn into two groups of four containing one team from each of the seeding positions 1–4. First, the team which was pre-selected as hosts was drawn from their own designated pot and allocated to their respective group (Group A) as per their seeding positions. Next, the remaining seven teams were drawn from their respective pot which were allocated according to their seeding positions.
- In the main round, the 28 teams were drawn into seven groups of four, containing one team from each of the seeding positions 1–4. First, the seven teams which were pre-selected as hosts were drawn from their own designated pot and allocated to their respective group as per their seeding positions. Next, the remaining 21 teams were drawn from their respective pot which were allocated according to their seeding positions (including the two preliminary round winners, whose identity was not known at the time of the draw, which were allocated to seeding position 4). Based on the decisions taken by the UEFA Emergency Panel, Russia and Ukraine would not be drawn into the same group. Moreover, should Kosovo advance from the preliminary round and qualify for a main round group with either Serbia or Bosnia and Herzegovina, they would be swapped with the team in seeding position 4 of the next possible main round group.

Final tournament hosts
| Team | Coeff | Rank |
|---|---|---|
| **Latvia** | 1.222 | 24 |

Participating teams for 2019 UEFA Under-19 Futsal Championship qualification

Teams entering main round
| Team | Coeff | Rank | Seed |
|---|---|---|---|
| **Russia** **(H)** | 10.171 | 1 | 1 |
| **Spain** | 10.022 | 2 | 1 |
| **Portugal** | 9.633 | 3 | 1 |
| Kazakhstan | 9.000 | 4 | 1 |
| **Ukraine** | 8.389 | 5 | 1 |
| Azerbaijan | 7.822 | 6 | 1 |
| Italy | 7.444 | 7 | 1 |
| Serbia | 6.833 | 8 | 2 |
| Slovenia **(H)** | 6.500 | 9 | 2 |
| **Croatia** **(H)** | 4.278 | 10 | 2 |
| Hungary | 4.111 | 11 | 2 |
| Czech Republic | 3.611 | 12 | 2 |
| Romania | 3.500 | 13 | 2 |
| **Poland** | 3.389 | 14 | 2 |
| France | 2.944 | 15 | 3 |
| Slovakia | 2.944 | 16 | 3 |
| Belarus | 2.889 | 17 | 3 |
| **Netherlands** | 2.278 | 18 | 3 |
| Bosnia and Herzegovina **(H)** | 2.222 | 19 | 3 |
| Belgium | 2.111 | 20 | 3 |
| Georgia **(H)** | 2.056 | 21 | 3 |
| North Macedonia **(H)** | 2.000 | 22 | 4 |
| Finland **(H)** | 1.694 | 23 | 4 |
| Turkey | 1.222 | 25 | 4 |
| Moldova | 0.833 | 26 | 4 |
| England | 0.833 | 27 | 4 |

Teams entering preliminary round
| Team | Coeff | Rank | Seed |
|---|---|---|---|
| Sweden | 0.778 | 29 | 1 |
| Montenegro | 0.722 | 30 | 1 |
| Kosovo | 0.667 | 33 | 2 |
| Greece | 0.500 | 37 | 2 |
| Lithuania **(H)** | 0.389 | 40 | 3 |
| Cyprus | 0.389 | 41 | 3 |
| Andorra | 0.222 | 43 | 4 |
| San Marino | 0.000 | 47 | 4 |

Notes

- Teams marked in **bold** have qualified for the final tournament.
- (H): Teams pre-selected as hosts for the preliminary round and the main round

== Format ==
In the preliminary round and main round, each group is played as a round-robin mini-tournament at the pre-selected hosts.

=== Tiebreakers ===
In the preliminary round and main round, teams are ranked according to points (3 points for a win, 1 point for a draw, 0 points for a loss), and if tied on points, the following tiebreaking criteria are applied, in the order given, to determine the rankings (Regulations Articles 14.01 and 14.02):

1. Points in head-to-head matches among tied teams;
2. Goal difference in head-to-head matches among tied teams;
3. Goals scored in head-to-head matches among tied teams;
4. If more than two teams are tied, and after applying all head-to-head criteria above, a subset of teams are still tied, all head-to-head criteria above are reapplied exclusively to this subset of teams;
5. Goal difference in all group matches;
6. Goals scored in all group matches;
7. Penalty shoot-out if only two teams have the same number of points, and they met in the last round of the group and are tied after applying all criteria above (not used if more than two teams have the same number of points, or if their rankings are not relevant for qualification for the next stage);
8. Disciplinary points (red card = 3 points, yellow card = 1 point, expulsion for two yellow cards in one match = 3 points);
9. UEFA coefficient for the qualifying round draw;
10. Drawing of lots.

== Schedule ==
The schedule of the competition is as follows.

Schedule for UEFA U-19 Futsal Euro 2019 qualifying
| Round | Draw | Dates |
|---|---|---|
| Preliminary round | 1 November 2018 | 21–26 January 2019 |
| Main round | 1 November 2018 | 26–31 March 2019 |

In the preliminary round and main round, the schedule of each group is as follows, with one rest day between matchdays 2 and 3 for four-team groups, and no rest days for three-team groups (Regulations Articles 21.04, 21.05 and 21.06):

Note: For scheduling, the hosts are considered as Team 1, while the visiting teams are considered as Team 2, Team 3, and Team 4 according to their seeding positions.

Group schedule
| Matchday | Matches (4 teams) | Matches (3 teams) |
|---|---|---|
| Matchday 1 | 2 v 4, 1 v 3 | 1 v 3 |
| Matchday 2 | 3 v 2, 1 v 4 | 3 v 2 |
| Matchday 3 | 4 v 3, 2 v 1 | 2 v 1 |

== Preliminary round ==
The winners of each group advance to main round to join the 26 teams which receive byes to main round.

Times are CET (UTC+1), as listed by UEFA (local times, if different, are in parentheses).

=== Group A ===
| Pos | Team | Pld | W | D | L | GF | GA | GD | Pts | Qualification |
|---|---|---|---|---|---|---|---|---|---|---|
| 1 | Greece | 3 | 2 | 1 | 0 | 11 | 7 | +4 | 7 | Main round |
| 2 | Andorra | 3 | 2 | 0 | 1 | 10 | 6 | +4 | 6 | |
| 3 | Lithuania (H) | 3 | 1 | 0 | 2 | 5 | 10 | −5 | 3 | |
| 4 | Montenegro | 3 | 0 | 1 | 2 | 3 | 6 | −3 | 1 | |

Source: UEFA
Rules for classification: Qualifying tiebreakers
(H) Hosts
22 January 2019
14:30 (15:30 EET)

| Montenegro | 2–3 | Andorra |
|---|---|---|
| Vukovic 22:12; Gacevic 22:38 | Report | Rodrigues 10:48; Massana 18:32; Blat 37:23 |

Jonava Sports Arena, Jonava
Referee: Christos Christou (Cyprus), Vladan Radulović (Serbia)
22 January 2019
17:30 (18:30 EET)

| Lithuania | 3–6 | Greece |
|---|---|---|
| Samsonik 6:00; Gudaitis 36:42; Venckus 37:01 | Report | Gegaj 11:31; Hatzifotiou 22:47; Liosis 30:12, 34:57, 36:03; Gousis 39:05 |

Jonava Sports Arena, Jonava
Referee: Trayan Enchev (Bulgaria), Valentin Ciuplea (Wales)

23 January 2019
14:30 (15:30 EET)

| Greece | 1–1 | Montenegro |
|---|---|---|
| Gousis 36:57 | Report | Drašković 15:20 |

Jonava Sports Arena, Jonava
Referee: Valentin Ciuplea (Wales), Christos Christou (Cyprus)
23 January 2019
17:30 (18:30 EET)

| Lithuania | 0–4 | Andorra |
|---|---|---|
| | Report | Vallverdú 12:02, 19:41; Blat 31:16; Pons 38:15 |

Jonava Sports Arena, Jonava
Referee: Vladan Radulović (Serbia), Trayan Enchev (Bulgaria)

25 January 2019
14:30 (15:30 EET)

| Andorra | 3–4 | Greece |
|---|---|---|
| Segura 15:48 (2pen.); Vallverdú 25:06, 32:11 | Report | Albino 6:24 (o.g.); Gegaj 7:47, 29:01, 30:23 |

Jonava Sports Arena, Jonava
Referee: Trayan Enchev (Bulgaria), Vladan Radulović (Serbia)
25 January 2019
17:30 (18:30 EET)

| Montenegro | 0–2 | Lithuania |
|---|---|---|
| | Report | Srėbalius 18:57; Kudirka 24:52 |

Jonava Sports Arena, Jonava
Referee: Christos Christou (Cyprus), Valentin Ciuplea (Wales)

=== Group B ===
| Pos | Team | Pld | W | D | L | GF | GA | GD | Pts | Qualification |
|---|---|---|---|---|---|---|---|---|---|---|
| 1 | Cyprus | 3 | 3 | 0 | 0 | 23 | 4 | +19 | 9 | Main round |
| 2 | Sweden | 3 | 2 | 0 | 1 | 13 | 7 | +6 | 6 | |
| 3 | Kosovo | 3 | 1 | 0 | 2 | 15 | 17 | −2 | 3 | |
| 4 | San Marino (H) | 3 | 0 | 0 | 3 | 2 | 25 | −23 | 0 | |

Source: UEFA
Rules for classification: Qualifying tiebreakers
(H) Hosts
22 January 2019
16:00

| Sweden | 1–6 | Cyprus |
|---|---|---|
| Milovanovic 1:01 | Report | Lackéll 1:33 (o.g.); Koulloupa 11:03; Loizou 16:11, 36:51; Tsitsos 26:41; P. Papadopoulos 29:34 |

Multieventi Sport Domus, Serravalle
Referee: Ingus Puriņš (Latvia), Gerard Roure Ramirez (Andorra)
22 January 2019
18:30

| San Marino | 2–11 | Kosovo |
|---|---|---|
| Baldelli 11:13, 23:17 | Report | Dragusha 6:55, 7:37; Berbatovci 9:34; Maxharraj 14:32, 18:04, 20:28, 32:45, 35:30; Michelotti 22:10 (o.g.); Mataj 29:01; Aliu 33:20 |

Multieventi Sport Domus, Serravalle
Referee: Ozan Soykan (Turkey), Jan Kresta (Czech Republic)

23 January 2019
16:00

| Kosovo | 1–6 | Sweden |
|---|---|---|
| Lahu 36:51 | Report | Näslund 1:44; Milovanovic 4:51, 14:47; Veselinovic 20:28, 35:32 (2pen.); Larsve 28:13 |

Multieventi Sport Domus, Serravalle
Referee: Jan Kresta (Czech Republic), Ingus Puriņš (Latvia)
23 January 2019
18:30

| San Marino | 0–8 | Cyprus |
|---|---|---|
| | Report | Koulloupa 3:09; Kypri 4:21, 30:35; Loizou 11:56; Sofroniou 14:08; Angelis 18:39; Poyiatzis 34:57; P. Papadopoulos 36:10 |

Multieventi Sport Domus, Serravalle
Referee: Gerard Roure Ramirez (Andorra), Ozan Soykan (Turkey)

25 January 2019
16:00

| Cyprus | 9–3 | Kosovo |
|---|---|---|
| Tsitsos 0:11, 34:44; Koulloupa 2:11, 32:36; Angelis 19:04, 23:42, 32:02; Loizou 19:55, 38:11 (2pen.) | Report | Lahu 1:51; Haliti 5:37; Maxharraj 16:02 |

Multieventi Sport Domus, Serravalle
Referee: Ozan Soykan (Turkey), Ingus Puriņš (Latvia)
25 January 2019
18:30

| Sweden | 6–0 | San Marino |
|---|---|---|
| Näslund 0:25, 8:13, 21:53; Sulejmanovic 6:09; Lackéll 17:27; Veselinovic 27:15 | Report |

Multieventi Sport Domus, Serravalle
Referee: Jan Kresta (Czech Republic), Gerard Roure Ramirez (Andorra)

== Main round ==
The winners of each group advance to the final tournament.

Times are CET (UTC+1), as listed by UEFA (local times, if different, are in parentheses).

=== Group 1 ===
| Pos | Team | Pld | W | D | L | GF | GA | GD | Pts | Qualification |
|---|---|---|---|---|---|---|---|---|---|---|
| 1 | Poland | 3 | 3 | 0 | 0 | 10 | 3 | +7 | 9 | Final tournament |
| 2 | France | 3 | 2 | 0 | 1 | 13 | 8 | +5 | 6 | |
| 3 | Finland (H) | 3 | 1 | 0 | 2 | 7 | 8 | −1 | 3 | |
| 4 | Kazakhstan | 3 | 0 | 0 | 3 | 4 | 15 | −11 | 0 | |

Source: UEFA
Rules for classification: Qualifying tiebreakers
(H) Hosts
27 March 2019
15:30 (16:30 EET)

| Kazakhstan | 3–7 | France |
|---|---|---|
| Sarsenbayev 15:16, 36:20; Kim 25:47 | Report | Delbergue 4:02, 26:30; Betgha 25:10; Toure 31:32, 38:04; Lambert 39:25; Melaine 39:49 |

Kauppi Sport Center, Tampere
Referee: Petar Radojcic (Serbia), Igor Puzović (Bosnia and Herzegovina)
27 March 2019
18:00 (19:00 EET)

| Finland | 1–3 | Poland |
|---|---|---|
| Jouppi 28:40 | Report | Matras 8:24; Pennanen 15:28 (o.g.); Prokop 21:56 |

Kauppi Sport Center, Tampere
Referee: Peter Nurse (England), Marjan Mladenovski (Macedonia)

28 March 2019
15:30 (16:30 EET)

| Poland | 5–1 | Kazakhstan |
|---|---|---|
| Palonek 10:02, 22:16; Matras 15:35; Matlęga 34:32; Borowik 38:35 | Report | Katubayev 23:14 |

Kauppi Sport Center, Tampere
Referee: Marjan Mladenovski (Macedonia), Petar Radojcic (Serbia)
28 March 2019
18:00 (19:00 EET)

| Finland | 3–5 | France |
|---|---|---|
| Hanni 7:19, 28:19; T. Kohonen 25:28 | Report | Fuss 0:07, 4:48, 27:48; Perian 30:45; Betgha 39:38 |

Kauppi Sport Center, Tampere
Referee: Igor Puzović (Bosnia and Herzegovina), Peter Nurse (England)

30 March 2019
15:30 (16:30 EET)

| France | 1–2 | Poland |
|---|---|---|
| Niakate 29:02 | Report | Lisiński 14:55; Palonek 34:36 |

Kauppi Sport Center, Tampere
Referee: Marjan Mladenovski (Macedonia), Igor Puzović (Bosnia and Herzegovina)
30 March 2019
18:00 (19:00 EET)

| Kazakhstan | 0–3 | Finland |
|---|---|---|
| | Report | S. Kohonen 10:10; T. Kohonen 35:12; Kaikkonen 36:15 (2pen.) |

Kauppi Sport Center, Tampere
Referee: Peter Nurse (England), Petar Radojcic (Serbia)

=== Group 2 ===
| Pos | Team | Pld | W | D | L | GF | GA | GD | Pts | Qualification |
|---|---|---|---|---|---|---|---|---|---|---|
| 1 | Netherlands | 3 | 3 | 0 | 0 | 15 | 6 | +9 | 9 | Final tournament |
| 2 | Slovenia (H) | 3 | 2 | 0 | 1 | 19 | 6 | +13 | 6 | |
| 3 | Cyprus | 3 | 1 | 0 | 2 | 8 | 11 | −3 | 3 | |
| 4 | Azerbaijan | 3 | 0 | 0 | 3 | 3 | 22 | −19 | 0 | |

Source: UEFA
Rules for classification: Qualifying tiebreakers
(H) Hosts
27 March 2019
17:30

| Slovenia | 4–5 | Netherlands |
|---|---|---|
| Debeljak 1:52; Mohorič 15:47; Bjelčević 29:27, 39:59 | Report | Kamp 24:32; Ben Khalou 26:37, 28:35; Taylor 30:17; Haruna Kabamba 36:13 |

Podčetrtek Sports Hall, Podčetrtek
Referee: Iurii Neverov (Russia), Damian Jaruchiewicz (Poland)
27 March 2019
19:45

| Azerbaijan | 1–7 | Cyprus |
|---|---|---|
| Garayev 35:47 | Report | Loizou 3:46, 18:17; El Kebbe 7:58; V. Papadopoulos 11:51, 26:18; Koulloupa 25:25, 28:37 |

Podčetrtek Sports Hall, Podčetrtek
Referee: Marco Rothenfluh (Switzerland), Ivo Tsenov (Bulgaria)

28 March 2019
16:30

| Netherlands | 6–1 | Azerbaijan |
|---|---|---|
| Van Londen 5:21, 10:16; Amheye 21:03; Ben Khalou 23:36; Azzanagui 30:25; Hendriks 39:40 | Report | Asadli 22:10 |

Podčetrtek Sports Hall, Podčetrtek
Referee: Damian Jaruchiewicz (Poland), Marco Rothenfluh (Switzerland)
28 March 2019
18:45

| Slovenia | 6–0 | Cyprus |
|---|---|---|
| Goznik 7:44; Bukovec 9:40, 33:23, 39:03, 39:59; Debeljak 21:13 | Report |

Podčetrtek Sports Hall, Podčetrtek
Referee: Ivo Tsenov (Bulgaria), Iurii Neverov (Russia)

30 March 2019
15:30

| Cyprus | 1–4 | Netherlands |
|---|---|---|
| El Kebbe 1:39 | Report | Azzanagui 5:08, 23:12; Loizou 16:10 (o.g.); El Terrahi 24:46 |

Podčetrtek Sports Hall, Podčetrtek
Referee: Iurii Neverov (Russia), Marco Rothenfluh (Switzerland)
30 March 2019
18:00

| Azerbaijan | 1–9 | Slovenia |
|---|---|---|
| Panahov 39:21 | Report | Goznik 0:26; Bjelčević 11:19, 29:30; Gajser 14:32, 38:18 (2pen.); Debeljak 15:55; Mohorič 18:17; Ciuha 27:40; Florjančič 31:57 |

Podčetrtek Sports Hall, Podčetrtek
Referee: Damian Jaruchiewicz (Poland), Ivo Tsenov (Bulgaria)

=== Group 3 ===
| Pos | Team | Pld | W | D | L | GF | GA | GD | Pts | Qualification |
|---|---|---|---|---|---|---|---|---|---|---|
| 1 | Portugal | 3 | 3 | 0 | 0 | 16 | 3 | +13 | 9 | Final tournament |
| 2 | Bosnia and Herzegovina (H) | 3 | 1 | 1 | 1 | 5 | 6 | −1 | 4 | |
| 3 | Moldova | 3 | 1 | 0 | 2 | 8 | 16 | −8 | 3 | |
| 4 | Serbia | 3 | 0 | 1 | 2 | 7 | 11 | −4 | 1 | |

Source: UEFA
Rules for classification: Qualifying tiebreakers
(H) Hosts
27 March 2019
17:00

| Bosnia and Herzegovina | 2–2 | Serbia |
|---|---|---|
| Mehmedović 8:55; Džindić 31:50 | Report | Milašinović 19:41; Rosić 33:15 |

USRC Midhat Hujdur Hujka, Mostar
Referee: David Urdanoz Apezteguia (Spain), Hikmat Qafarli (Azerbaijan)
27 March 2019
20:00

| Portugal | 10–1 | Moldova |
|---|---|---|
| Daniel Costa 3:11; Sévio Marcelo 6:59; Milton Dias 9:50, 16:10; Tomás Reis 12:47; Rúben Góis 18:34; Tomás Paçó 24:12, 25:05; Hugo Neves 31:56; Niţa 33:52 (o.g.) | Report | Anton 6:04 |

USRC Midhat Hujdur Hujka, Mostar
Referee: Valentin Ciuplea (Wales), Yiangos Yiangou (Cyprus)

28 March 2019
17:00

| Serbia | 1–3 | Portugal |
|---|---|---|
| Radak 10:30 | Report | Célio Coque 24:23, 34:49; Tomás Reis 36:42 |

USRC Midhat Hujdur Hujka, Mostar
Referee: Hikmat Qafarli (Azerbaijan), Valentin Ciuplea (Wales)
28 March 2019
20:00

| Bosnia and Herzegovina | 2–1 | Moldova |
|---|---|---|
| Džemić 20:34; Džindić 31:56 | Report | Cojocaru 20:54 |

USRC Midhat Hujdur Hujka, Mostar
Referee: Yiangos Yiangou (Cyprus), David Urdanoz Apezteguia (Spain)

30 March 2019
17:00

| Moldova | 6–4 | Serbia |
|---|---|---|
| Cojocaru 10:46, 30:45 (2pen.), 39:29; Petrachi 13:44; Anton 27:04; Crasnov 38:30 | Report | Marinković 3:21; Valiulov 6:31 (o.g.); Coval 20:48 (o.g.); Urošević 34:01 |

USRC Midhat Hujdur Hujka, Mostar
Referee: Yiangos Yiangou (Cyprus), Hikmat Qafarli (Azerbaijan)
30 March 2019
20:00

| Portugal | 3–1 | Bosnia and Herzegovina |
|---|---|---|
| Célio Coque 16:30; Milton Dias 18:45; Gustavo Rodrigues 25:42 | Report | Džemić 1:34 |

USRC Midhat Hujdur Hujka, Mostar
Referee: David Urdanoz Apezteguia (Spain), Valentin Ciuplea (Wales)

=== Group 4 ===
| Pos | Team | Pld | W | D | L | GF | GA | GD | Pts | Qualification |
|---|---|---|---|---|---|---|---|---|---|---|
| 1 | Ukraine | 3 | 3 | 0 | 0 | 14 | 7 | +7 | 9 | Final tournament |
| 2 | Belgium | 3 | 2 | 0 | 1 | 15 | 4 | +11 | 6 | |
| 3 | Romania | 3 | 1 | 0 | 2 | 12 | 11 | +1 | 3 | |
| 4 | North Macedonia (H) | 3 | 0 | 0 | 3 | 3 | 22 | −19 | 0 | |

Source: UEFA
Rules for classification: Qualifying tiebreakers
(H) Hosts
26 March 2019
16:00

| Ukraine | 3–2 | Belgium |
|---|---|---|
| Blank 25:07; Zavertanyi 35:31; Ovakimian 37:52 | Report | Yachou 3:24; Bakija 28:00 |

SRC Kale, Skopje
Referee: Murat Colak (Turkey), Lars Van Leeuwen (Netherlands)
26 March 2019
18:30

| North Macedonia | 2–7 | Romania |
|---|---|---|
| Aljili 16:01; Manasiev 30:31 | Report | Ghiuță 12:00, 12:49; Gavrila 13:01, 37:48, 38:30 (2pen.); Matei 32:15; Crișan 39:21 |

SRC Kale, Skopje
Referee: Danijel Darandik (Germany), Olli Niemelä (Finland)

27 March 2019
16:00

| Romania | 4–5 | Ukraine |
|---|---|---|
| Dudau 8:21; Duda 30:59, 38:16; Gavrila 31:52 | Report | Blank 5:07, 20:41; Kvasnii 19:05; Nahornyi 22:49; Zavertanyi 29:19 |

SRC Kale, Skopje
Referee: Olli Niemelä (Finland), Murat Colak (Turkey)
27 March 2019
18:30

| North Macedonia | 0–9 | Belgium |
|---|---|---|
| | Report | Bakija 8:21, 10:09, 22:18, 23:06; Dresselaers 18:45, 23:31; Dochez 30:24, 38:31; Achalhi 31:21 |

SRC Kale, Skopje
Referee: Lars Van Leeuwen (Netherlands), Danijel Darandik (Germany)

29 March 2019
16:00

| Belgium | 4–1 | Romania |
|---|---|---|
| Dresselaers 6:50; Bakija 20:54, 32:39; El Bouazzaoui 35:11 | Report | Crișan 1:24 |

SRC Kale, Skopje
Referee: Olli Niemelä (Finland), Lars Van Leeuwen (Netherlands)
29 March 2019
18:30

| Ukraine | 6–1 | North Macedonia |
|---|---|---|
| Masevych 8:49, 9:57; Blank 23:54; Tasevski 28:38 (o.g.); Sorokin 34:32; Nahornyi 37:58 | Report | Iseni 2:56 |

SRC Kale, Skopje
Referee: Danijel Darandik (Germany), Murat Colak (Turkey)

=== Group 5 ===
| Pos | Team | Pld | W | D | L | GF | GA | GD | Pts | Qualification |
|---|---|---|---|---|---|---|---|---|---|---|
| 1 | Spain | 3 | 3 | 0 | 0 | 10 | 2 | +8 | 9 | Final tournament |
| 2 | Turkey | 3 | 2 | 0 | 1 | 12 | 9 | +3 | 6 | |
| 3 | Hungary | 3 | 1 | 0 | 2 | 8 | 12 | −4 | 3 | |
| 4 | Georgia (H) | 3 | 0 | 0 | 3 | 4 | 11 | −7 | 0 | |

Source: UEFA
Rules for classification: Qualifying tiebreakers
(H) Hosts
24 March 2019
11:00 (14:00 GET)

| Spain | 4–2 | Turkey |
|---|---|---|
| Povill 3:01; Ceron 6:42; Pérez 13:05 (pen.); Marrón 18:05 | Report | Balcı 37:17, 37:42 |

Olympic Palace, Tbilisi
Referee: Aleš Mocnik Peric (Slovenia), Mantas Pomeckis (Lithuania)
24 March 2019
14:00 (17:00 GET)

| Georgia | 2–5 | Hungary |
|---|---|---|
| Koshadze 24:47; Chaduneli 28:34 | Report | Tama 2:38; M. Fekete 25:00, 37:32; Soltész 35:13, 37:18 |

Olympic Palace, Tbilisi
Referee: Nicola Manzione (Italy), Filip Nesnera (Czech Republic)

25 March 2019
11:00 (14:00 GET)

| Hungary | 0–3 | Spain |
|---|---|---|
| | Report | Ceron 9:29; Pérez 17:09; Molina 36:22 |

Olympic Palace, Tbilisi
Referee: Filip Nesnera (Czech Republic), Aleš Mocnik Peric (Slovenia)
25 March 2019
14:00 (17:00 GET)

| Georgia | 2–3 | Turkey |
|---|---|---|
| Şenocak 13:45 (o.g.); Ghavtadze 18:44 | Report | Şen 0:15; Dıraga 8:20; Acar 33:20 |

Olympic Palace, Tbilisi
Referee: Mantas Pomeckis (Lithuania), Nicola Manzione (Italy)

27 March 2019
11:00 (14:00 GET)

| Turkey | 7–3 | Hungary |
|---|---|---|
| Balcı 24:13, 36:16, 37:16; Özkan 25:47, 27:45, 31:56; Aygün 28:44 | Report | Juhász 5:18; Nagy 18:21; O. Fekete 33:36 |

Olympic Palace, Tbilisi
Referee: Mantas Pomeckis (Lithuania), Filip Nesnera (Czech Republic)
27 March 2019
14:00 (17:00 GET)

| Spain | 3–0 | Georgia |
|---|---|---|
| Mayor 6:41, 7:58; Molina 9:09 | Report |

Olympic Palace, Tbilisi
Referee: Nicola Manzione (Italy), Aleš Mocnik Peric (Slovenia)

=== Group 6 ===
| Pos | Team | Pld | W | D | L | GF | GA | GD | Pts | Qualification |
|---|---|---|---|---|---|---|---|---|---|---|
| 1 | Russia (H) | 3 | 3 | 0 | 0 | 19 | 0 | +19 | 9 | Final tournament |
| 2 | Czech Republic | 3 | 1 | 1 | 1 | 9 | 12 | −3 | 4 | |
| 3 | Belarus | 3 | 1 | 1 | 1 | 8 | 11 | −3 | 4 | |
| 4 | Greece | 3 | 0 | 0 | 3 | 2 | 15 | −13 | 0 | |

Source: UEFA
Rules for classification: Qualifying tiebreakers
(H) Hosts
27 March 2019
15:00 (17:00 MSK)

| Czech Republic | 6–2 | Greece |
|---|---|---|
| Štanglica 11:56; Balog 17:57; Zajíček 32:45, 37:36; Havrda 36:03; Blahuta 37:20 | Report | Hatzifotiou 22:13; Gousis 25:41 |

USC Podmoskovie, Shchyolkovo
Referee: Daniel Deca (Romania), Vedran Babic (Croatia)
27 March 2019
18:00 (20:00 MSK)

| Russia | 8–0 | Belarus |
|---|---|---|
| Karpov 5:25, 17:54; Okulov 6:35; Karpyuk 9:16, 23:47, 37:52; Titkov 21:58; Gereykhanov 35:24 | Report |

USC Podmoskovie, Shchyolkovo
Referee: Veljko Bošković (Montenegro), Aslan Galayev (Kazakhstan)

28 March 2019
15:00 (17:00 MSK)

| Belarus | 3–3 | Czech Republic |
|---|---|---|
| Shvedko 0:47, 9:36; Chernyak 25:05 | Report | Buchta 2:48, 11:37; Havrda 32:04 |

USC Podmoskovie, Shchyolkovo
Referee: Aslan Galayev (Kazakhstan), Daniel Deca (Romania)
28 March 2019
17:30 (19:30 MSK)

| Russia | 4–0 | Greece |
|---|---|---|
| Okulov 2:46; Karpyuk 19:30, 26:06; Barbakov 36:12 | Report |

USC Podmoskovie, Shchyolkovo
Referee: Vedran Babic (Croatia), Veljko Bošković (Montenegro)

30 March 2019
15:00 (17:00 MSK)

| Greece | 0–5 | Belarus |
|---|---|---|
| | Report | Chernyak 13:17; Antonov 19:59; Dubkov 28:34; Shvedko 36:21; Voronin 36:53 |

USC Podmoskovie, Shchyolkovo
Referee: Veljko Bošković (Montenegro), Daniel Deca (Romania)
30 March 2019
17:30 (19:30 MSK)

| Czech Republic | 0–7 | Russia |
|---|---|---|
| | Report | Gereykhanov 6:54; Okulov 10:18; Golovachev 14:14, 28:51; Karpyuk 15:50 (2pen.); Karpov 18:58 (pen.); Titkov 30:31 |

USC Podmoskovie, Shchyolkovo
Referee: Vedran Babic (Croatia), Aslan Galayev (Kazakhstan)

=== Group 7 ===
| Pos | Team | Pld | W | D | L | GF | GA | GD | Pts | Qualification |
|---|---|---|---|---|---|---|---|---|---|---|
| 1 | Croatia (H) | 3 | 2 | 0 | 1 | 10 | 3 | +7 | 6 (Note: Head-to-head result: Croatia 6–2 Slovakia.) | Final tournament |
| 2 | Slovakia | 3 | 2 | 0 | 1 | 9 | 9 | 0 | 6 | |
| 3 | England | 3 | 1 | 0 | 2 | 2 | 6 | −4 | 3 (Note: Head-to-head result: Italy 1–2 England.) | |
| 4 | Italy | 3 | 1 | 0 | 2 | 5 | 8 | −3 | 3 | |

Source: UEFA
Rules for classification: Qualifying tiebreakers
(H) Hosts
Notes:
27 March 2019
16:00

| Italy | 1–2 | England |
|---|---|---|
| Achilli 38:36 | Report | Deer 35:35; Rand 39:32 |

Mladost Hall, Karlovac
Referee: Yaroslav Vovchok (Ukraine), Omar Rafiq (Norway)
27 March 2019
18:30

| Croatia | 6–2 | Slovakia |
|---|---|---|
| Rendić 23:41, 31:18; Vukelić 27:38, 30:56, 32:50; Radić 37:21 | Report | Koricina 5:17, 17:52 |

Mladost Hall, Karlovac
Referee: Cristiano José Cardoso Santos (Portugal), Julien Lang (France)

28 March 2019
16:00

| Slovakia | 6–3 | Italy |
|---|---|---|
| Marton 20:26, 36:52, 39:16; Koricina 23:20, 28:27; Medoň 23:41 | Report | Giulii Capponi 9:28; Palmegiani 17:53; Podda 26:27 |

Mladost Hall, Karlovac
Referee: Julien Lang (France), Yaroslav Vovchok (Ukraine)
28 March 2019
18:30

| Croatia | 4–0 | England |
|---|---|---|
| Radić 1:59; Vukelić 27:26, 33:35, 38:36 | Report |

Mladost Hall, Karlovac
Referee: Omar Rafiq (Norway), Cristiano José Cardoso Santos (Portugal)

30 March 2019
14:00

| England | 0–1 | Slovakia |
|---|---|---|
| | Report | Bulmer 32:41 (o.g.) |

Mladost Hall, Karlovac
Referee: Julien Lang (France), Omar Rafiq (Norway)
30 March 2019
16:30

| Italy | 1–0 | Croatia |
|---|---|---|
| Giulii Capponi 30:40 | Report |

Mladost Hall, Karlovac
Referee: Cristiano José Cardoso Santos (Portugal), Yaroslav Vovchok (Ukraine)

== Qualified teams ==
The following eight teams qualify for the final tournament.

| Team | Qualified as | Qualified on |
|---|---|---|
| Latvia | Hosts | 27 September 2018 |
| Poland | Main round Group 1 winners | 30 March 2019 |
| Netherlands | Main round Group 2 winners | 30 March 2019 |
| Portugal | Main round Group 3 winners | 30 March 2019 |
| Ukraine | Main round Group 4 winners | 27 March 2019 |
| Spain | Main round Group 5 winners | 25 March 2019 |
| Russia | Main round Group 6 winners | 30 March 2019 |
| Croatia | Main round Group 7 winners | 28 March 2019 |

== Top goalscorers ==
- Preliminary round: There were 82 goals scored in 12 matches, for an average of 6.83 goals per match.
- Main round: There were 257 goals scored in 42 matches, for an average of 6.12 goals per match.

— Team eliminated / inactive for this stage.

| Rank | Player | PR | MR | Total |
|---|---|---|---|---|
| 1 | (Belgium) Qendrim Bakija | — | 7 | 7 |
| 1 | (Cyprus) Mamas Loizou | 5 | 2 | 7 |
| 3 | (Croatia) Fran Vukelić | — | 6 | 6 |
| 3 | (Cyprus) Charis Koulloupa | 4 | 2 | 6 |
| 3 | (Kosovo) Drilon Maxharraj | 6 | — | 6 |
| 3 | (Russia) Danil Karpyuk | — | 6 | 6 |
| 7 | (Turkey) Bünyamin Balcı | — | 5 | 5 |
| 8 | (Andorra) Joel Vallverdú | 4 | — | 4 |
| 8 | (Cyprus) Dimitrios Angelis | 4 | 0 | 4 |
| 8 | (Greece) Kristo Gegaj | 4 | 0 | 4 |
| 8 | (Moldova) Iulian Cojocaru | — | 4 | 4 |
| 8 | (Romania) Sergiu-David Gavrila | — | 4 | 4 |
| 8 | (Slovakia) Jozef Koricina | — | 4 | 4 |
| 8 | (Slovenia) Marko Bjelčević | — | 4 | 4 |
| 8 | (Slovenia) Jeremy Bukovec | — | 4 | 4 |
| 8 | (Sweden) Albin Näslund | 4 | — | 4 |
| 8 | (Ukraine) Denys Blank | — | 4 | 4 |
