= 1997 World Ice Hockey Championships =

1997 World Ice Hockey Championships may refer to:

- 1997 Men's World Ice Hockey Championships
- 1997 IIHF Women's World Championship
