= Time in Romania =

Time in Europe: Light Blue / Western European Time / Greenwich Mean Time (UTC); Blue / Western European Time / Greenwich Mean Time (UTC); Blue / Western European Summer Time / British Summer Time / Irish Standard Time (UTC+1); Red / Central European Time (UTC+1); Red / Central European Summer Time (UTC+2); Yellow / Eastern European Time / Kaliningrad Time (UTC+2); Ochre / Eastern European Time (UTC+2); Ochre / Eastern European Summer Time (UTC+3); Green / Moscow Time / Turkey Time (UTC+3); Turquoise / Armenia Time / Azerbaijan Time / Georgia Time / Samara Time (UTC+4); ▉▉▉▉ Pale hues: Standard time observed all year ▉▉▉ Dark hues: Daylight saving time

In Romania, the standard time is Eastern European Time (Romanian: Ora Europei de Est; EET; UTC+02:00). Daylight saving time, which moves one hour ahead to UTC+03:00 is observed from the last Sunday in March to the last Sunday in October.

== Daylight saving time ==
Daylight saving time (DST) in Romania (locally known by "Ora de Vară") was originally introduced in 1932 (between 22 May and 2 October). Between 1933 and 1940, DST started on the first Sunday in April and ended on the first Sunday in October. DST was abandoned in 1941 and reintroduced in 1979. Since 1996, with a few exceptions from the norm, DST in Romania has followed the European Union rules.

== Time notation ==
The 24-hour clock is used for official purposes, including transport schedules, however in everyday conversation Romanians commonly use the 12-hour clock.

== IANA time zone database ==
In the IANA time zone database, Romania is given one zone in the file zone.tab – Europe/Bucharest. Data for Romania directly from zone.tab of the IANA time zone database; columns marked with * are the columns from zone.tab itself:

| c.c.* | coordinates* | TZ* | Comments | UTC offset | DST |
|---|---|---|---|---|---|
| RO | +4426+02606 | Europe/Bucharest | | +02:00 | +03:00 |

== See also ==
- Time in Europe
- List of time zones by country
- List of time zones by UTC offset
