= 1991 World Ice Hockey Championships =

1991 World Ice Hockey Championships may refer to:

- 1991 Men's Ice Hockey World Championships
- 1991 World Junior Ice Hockey Championships
