= Antonio Pérez (futsal player) =

Spanish futsal player (born 2000)

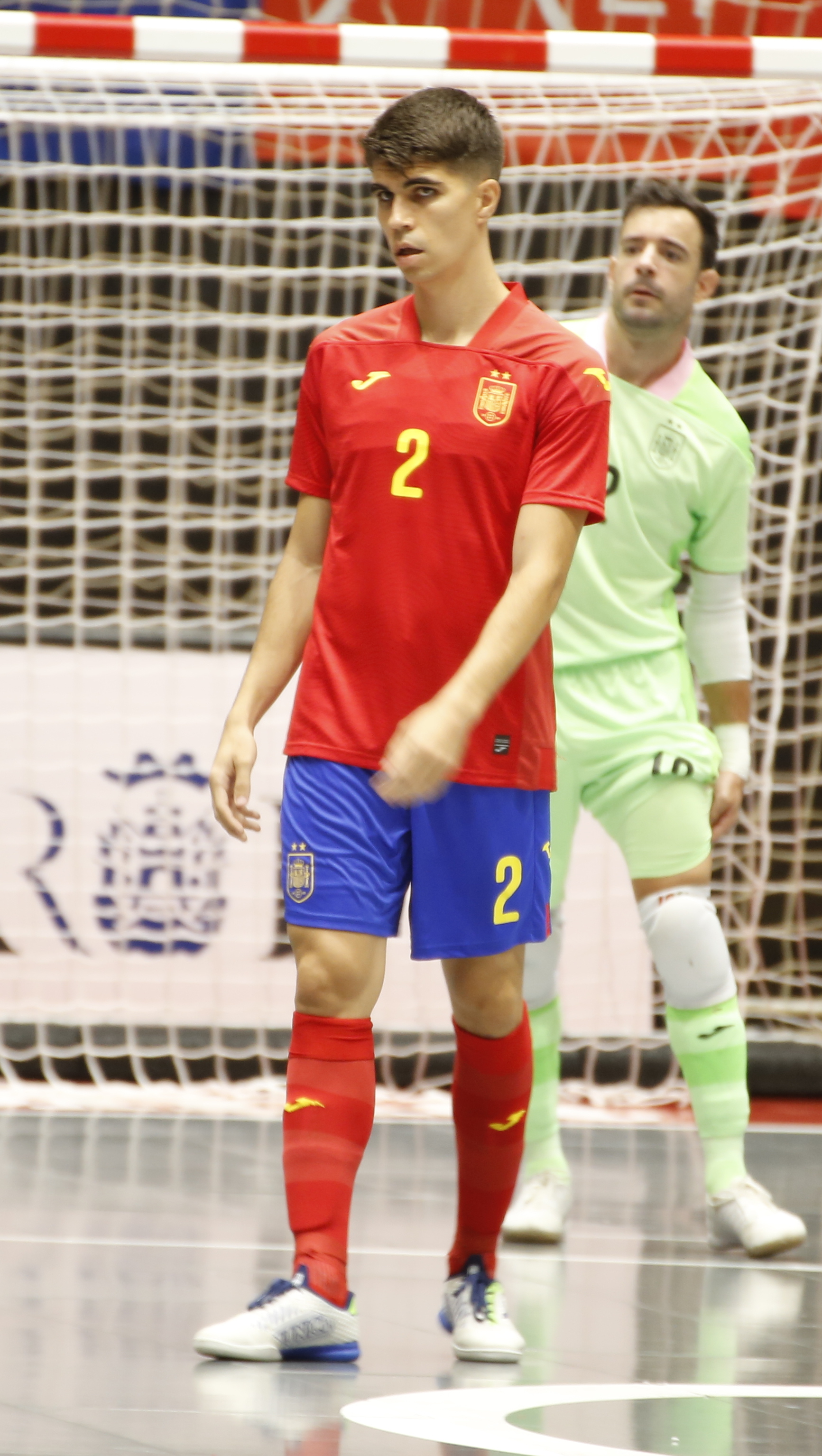

Personal information
- Full name: Antonio Pérez Ortega
- Date of birth: 19 October 2000 (age 26)
- Place of birth: Jaén, Spain
- Position: Defender

Team information
- Current team: FC Barcelona
- Number: 6

Senior career*
Years	Team	Apps	(Gls)
2019–2022	Jaén		
2022–	FC Barcelona		

International career^{‡}
2018–2019	Spain U19		
2021–	Spain		
Medal record
Men's futsal
Representing Spain
UEFA Under-19 Futsal Championship
Winner	2019 Riga
Representing Spain
UEFA Futsal Championship
Winner	2026 Latvia / Lithuania / Slovenia
- * Club domestic league appearances and goals as of 30 December 2025 ‡ National team caps and goals as of 19 August 2025

Antonio Pérez Ortega (born 19 October 2000), also known mononymously as Antonio, is a Spanish professional futsal player who plays as a defender for FC Barcelona and the Spain national team.

== Club career ==
Pérez joined the youth ranks of Jaén FS at the cadet level. In April 2019, at the age of 18, he made his debut in the Primera División.

In the summer of 2022, his contract with his hometown team ended, and Pérez joined FC Barcelona on a free transfer, where he won his first club titles.

== International career ==
Pérez has been an international player in the youth teams, with the under-19 team, with whom he won the 2019 UEFA Under-19 Championship, and with the under-21 team.

On 15 November 2021, Pérez made his debut with the senior national team in a 3-0 victory against Ukraine.

In 2026, Pérez was part of the Spanish squad that won the UEFA Futsal Euro and was also chosen as the best player of the tournament where he scored 7 goals.

== Honours ==
FC Barcelona

- Primera División: 2022–23, 2025–26
- Copa del Rey: 2022–23
- Supercopa de España: 2023
- Copa de España (LNFS): 2024

Spain U-19

- UEFA Under-19 Futsal Championship: 2019

Spain

- UEFA Futsal Championship: 2026

Individual

- UEFA Futsal Championship Golden Boot: 2026
- UEFA Futsal Championship Player of the Tournament: 2026
- UEFA Futsal Championship Team of the Tournament: 2026
