= 2003 World Ice Hockey Championships =

2003 World Ice Hockey Championships may refer to:

- 2003 Men's World Ice Hockey Championships
- 2003 Women's World Ice Hockey Championships
- 2003 World Junior Ice Hockey Championships
- 2003 IIHF World U18 Championships
