= Croatia national under-19 futsal team =

Croatia U19
- Association: Croatian Football Federation
- Confederation: UEFA (Europe)
- Head coach: Duje Maretić
- Captain: Nikola Čižmić
- Most caps: Božo Sučić (10)
- Top scorer: Fran Vukelić (8)
- FIFA code: CRO
Home colours	Away colours

First international
- North Macedonia 4–4 Croatia (Skopje, North Macedonia; February 1, 2019)

Biggest win
- Netherlands 0–6 Croatia (Varaždin, Croatia; September 9, 2019)

Biggest defeat
- Croatia 0–10 Spain (Poreč, Croatia; June 19, 2021)

European U-19 Championship
- Appearances: 1 (First in 2019)
- Best result: Runner-up (2019)

The Croatia national under-19 futsal team represents Croatia in futsal competitions for players aged 21 or under. Croatia is currently ranked 2nd by UEFA coefficient.

== Results ==
=== UEFA Under 19 Futsal Championship ===
UEFA European Under-19 Futsal Championship Record
Year	Round	Position	Pld	W	D	L	GF	GA	Squad	Position	Pld	W	D	L	GF	GA
Latvia 2019	Runner up	2	5	2	1	2	12	12	Squad	1/4	3	2	0	1	10	3
Spain 2022	To be determined															
Total	Runner up	1/1	5	2	1	2	12	12			3	2	0	1	10	3

== Players ==
=== Current squad ===
Squad for 2019 Euro Under-19

No.	Pos.	Player	Date of birth (age)	Caps	Goals	Club
1	GK	Nikola Čizmić	31 October 2000 (aged 18)			(Croatian Football Federation) FC Split
2	FW	Duje Dragun	6 April 2000 (aged 19)			(Croatian Football Federation) MNK Aurelia
3	DF	Filip Petrušić	28 December 2000 (aged 18)			(Croatian Football Federation) MNK Osijek
4	MF	Božo Sučić	5 August 2000 (aged 19)			(Croatian Football Federation) FC Split
5	DF	Toni Rendić	11 September 2000 (aged 18)			(Croatian Football Federation) FC Split
6	MF	Antonijo Papac	12 June 2000 (aged 19)			(Croatian Football Federation) Uspinjača-Gimka
7	DF	Jakov Hrstić	25 August 2000 (aged 19)			(Croatian Football Federation) FC Split
8	MF	Dominik Cvišić	4 March 2000 (aged 19)			(Croatian Football Federation) Futsal Dinamo
9	FW	Vicko Radić	31 January 2001 (aged 18)			(Croatian Football Federation) FC Split
10	MF	Josip Jurlina	13 January 2000 (aged 19)			(Croatian Football Federation) FC Split
11	MF	Fran Vukelić	9 October 2001 (aged 17)			(Croatian Football Federation) Uspinjača-Gimka
12	GK	Filip Radaj	10 September 2000 (aged 18)			(Croatian Football Federation) MNK Crnica
13	MF	Jakov Mudronja	23 September 2000 (aged 18)			(Croatian Football Federation) Heroji 2007
14	DF	Mateo Mužar	28 June 2001 (aged 18)			(Croatian Football Federation) Futsal Dinamo
