= 2019 UEFA Under-19 Futsal Championship =

Tournament details
- Host country: Latvia
- City: Riga
- Dates: 8–14 September
- Teams: 8 (from 1 confederation)
- Venue(s): 1 (in 1 host city)

Final positions
- Champions: Spain (1st title)
- Runners-up: Croatia

Tournament statistics
- Matches played: 15
- Goals scored: 78 (5.2 per match)
- Top scorer(s): (Spain) Adrián Rodríguez (Spain) Antonio Pérez (5 goals each)

The 2019 UEFA Under-19 Futsal Championship (also known as UEFA Under-19 Futsal Euro 2019) was the first edition of the UEFA Under-19 Futsal Championship, the biennial international youth futsal championship organised by UEFA for the men's under-19 national teams of Europe. The tournament was held at the Arēna Rīga in Riga, Latvia between 8–14 September 2019.

A total of eight teams played in the final tournament, with players born on or after 1 January 2000 eligible to participate. Spain won the title to become the first UEFA Under-19 Futsal Euro champions.

== Host selection ==
The bid requirements were made available on 13 April 2018. A total of seven countries declared interest in hosting the tournament:

- Croatia
- Georgia
- Hungary
- Latvia
- Portugal
- Russia
- Ukraine

Only Georgia and Latvia submitted the bid dossier by the deadline of 25 July. Latvia were appointed as hosts by the UEFA Executive Committee on 27 September 2018.

== Qualification ==
A total of 35 UEFA nations entered the competition, and with the hosts Latvia qualifying automatically, the other 34 teams competed in the qualifying competition to determine the remaining seven spots in the final tournament. The qualifying competition consisted of two rounds:

- Preliminary round: The eight lowest-ranked teams were drawn into two groups of four teams. Each group was played in single round-robin format at one of the pre-selected hosts. The two group winners advanced to the main round.
- Main round: The 28 teams (26 highest-ranked teams and two preliminary round qualifiers) were drawn into seven groups of four teams. Each group was played in single round-robin format at one of the pre-selected hosts. The seven group winners qualified to the final tournament.

The qualifying draw was held on 1 November 2018. The preliminary round was held between 21 and 26 January 2019, and the main round was held between 26 and 31 March 2019.

=== Qualified teams ===
The following teams qualified for the final tournament.

Team	Method of qualification
Latvia	Hosts
Poland	Main round Group 1 winners
Netherlands	Main round Group 2 winners
Portugal	Main round Group 3 winners
Ukraine	Main round Group 4 winners
Spain	Main round Group 5 winners
Russia	Main round Group 6 winners
Croatia	Main round Group 7 winners

=== Final draw ===
The final draw was held on 7 June 2019, 21:00 EEST (UTC+3), at the Daugava Stadium in Riga, Latvia. The eight teams were drawn into two groups of four teams. There was no seeding, except that the hosts Latvia were assigned to position A1 in the draw. Based on the decisions taken by the UEFA Emergency Panel, Russia and Ukraine would not be drawn into the same group.

== Squads ==
Each national team have to submit a squad of 14 players, two of whom must be goalkeepers.

== Group stage ==
The final tournament schedule was announced on 25 June 2019.

The group winners and runners-up advance to the semi-finals.

Tiebreakers

In the group stage, teams are ranked according to points (3 points for a win, 1 point for a draw, 0 points for a loss), and if tied on points, the following tiebreaking criteria are applied, in the order given, to determine the rankings (Regulations Articles 18.01 and 18.02):

1. Points in head-to-head matches among tied teams;
2. Goal difference in head-to-head matches among tied teams;
3. Goals scored in head-to-head matches among tied teams;
4. If more than two teams are tied, and after applying all head-to-head criteria above, a subset of teams are still tied, all head-to-head criteria above are reapplied exclusively to this subset of teams;
5. Goal difference in all group matches;
6. Goals scored in all group matches;
7. Penalty shoot-out if only two teams have the same number of points, and they met in the last round of the group and are tied after applying all criteria above (not used if more than two teams have the same number of points, or if their rankings are not relevant for qualification for the next stage);
8. Disciplinary points (red card = 3 points, yellow card = 1 point, expulsion for two yellow cards in one match = 3 points);
9. UEFA coefficient for the qualifying round draw;
10. Drawing of lots.

All times are local, EEST (UTC+3).

=== Group A ===
Pos	Team	Pld	W	D	L	GF	GA	GD	Pts	Qualification
1	Portugal	3	3	0	0	13	2	+11	9	Knockout stage
2	Poland	3	2	0	1	7	6	+1	6	Knockout stage
3	Russia	3	1	0	2	8	8	0	3	
4	Latvia (H)	3	0	0	3	2	14	−12	0	

Updated to match(es) played on 11 September 2019. Source: UEFA
Rules for classification: Group stage tiebreakers
(H) Hosts
8 September 2019
17:30

Poland	3–2	Russia
Krzysztof Iwanek 10:03; Jakub Raszkowski 16:15; Bartosz Borowik 31:04 (2pen.)	Report	Pavel Karpov 3:27, 32:25

Arēna Rīga, Riga
Attendance: 475
Referee: Admir Zahovič (Slovenia), Vedran Babić (Croatia)
8 September 2019
20:00

Latvia	0–6	Portugal
	Report	Andrejs Iļjins 11:22 (o.g.); Hugo Neves 15:03, 29:52; Célio Coque 23:44; Rui Moreira 24:37; Daniel Costa 36:12

Arēna Rīga, Riga
Attendance: 1150
Referee: Juan José Cordero (Spain), Chiara Perona (Italy)

9 September 2019
17:30

Russia	5–1	Latvia
Danil Karpyuk 13:48, 32:12; Pavel Karpov 14:02; Denis Titkov 29:19; Kamil Gereykhanov 35:48	Report	Edgars Tarakanovs 24:54

Arēna Rīga, Riga
Attendance: 650
Referee: Grigori Ošomkov (Estonia), Daniel Matkovic (Switzerland)
9 September 2019
20:00

Poland	1–3	Portugal
Tomasz Palonek 12:39	Report	Tomás Reis 4:00; Ricardo Lopes 7:16, 8:20

Arēna Rīga, Riga
Attendance: 260
Referee: Yaroslav Vovchok (Ukraine), Michael Christofides (Cyprus)

11 September 2019
12:30

Portugal	4–1	Russia
Sévio Marcelo 13:24, 39:31; Tomás Paçó 39:01; Tomás Reis 39:41	Report	Denis Titkov 2:21

Arēna Rīga, Riga
Attendance: 250
Referee: Vedran Babić (Croatia), Juan José Cordero (Spain)
11 September 2019
20:00

Latvia	1–3	Poland
Toms Grīslis 27:30	Report	Tomasz Palonek 13:23; Bartosz Borowik 21:24; Piotr Matras 31:34

Arēna Rīga, Riga
Attendance: 710
Referee: Chiara Perona (Italy), Yaroslav Vovchok (Ukraine)

=== Group B ===
Pos	Team	Pld	W	D	L	GF	GA	GD	Pts	Qualification
1	Spain	3	3	0	0	15	1	+14	9	Knockout stage
2	Croatia	3	2	0	1	9	4	+5	6	Knockout stage
3	Ukraine	3	1	0	2	9	10	−1	3	
4	Netherlands	3	0	0	3	0	18	−18	0	

Source: UEFA
Rules for classification: Group stage tiebreakers
8 September 2019
12:30

Ukraine	7–0	Netherlands
Danylo Bielan 4:09, 15:31, 26:31; Denys Blank 11:22; Marian Masevych 23:39; Eduard Nahornyi 34:53; Oleh Nehela 35:28	Report

Arēna Rīga, Riga
Attendance: 250
Referee: Ingus Puriņš (Latvia), Cristiano José Cardoso (Portugal)
8 September 2019
15:00

Croatia	0–3	Spain
	Report	Adrián Rodríguez 3:23; Antonio Pérez 22:33; Jesús Gordillo 25:14

Arēna Rīga, Riga
Attendance: 450
Referee: Jan Kresta (Czech Republic), Marjan Mladenovski (North Macedonia)

9 September 2019
12:30

Netherlands	0–6	Croatia
	Report	Božo Sučić 16:38, 17:54; Jakov Mudronja 21:09; Filip Petrušić 25:22; Toni Rendić 32:53; Fran Vukelić 34:34

Arēna Rīga, Riga
Attendance: 120
Referee: Irina Velikanova (Russia), Fatma Özlem Tursun (Turkey)
9 September 2019
15:00

Ukraine	1–7	Spain
Oleh Nehela 15:05	Report	Bernat Povill 2:46; Antonio Pérez 19:26 (2pen.); David Peña 21:58, 38:45; Cristian Molina 24:05; Adrián Rodríguez 30:03; Eduard Volkov 38:06 (o.g)

Arēna Rīga, Riga
Attendance: 295
Referee: Borislav Kolev (Bulgaria), Slawomir Steczko (Poland)

11 September 2019
15:00

Croatia	3–1	Ukraine
Jakov Hrstić 16:06, 31:24; Božo Sučić 39:30	Report	Denys Blank 12:51

Arēna Rīga, Riga
Attendance: 200
Referee: Cristiano José Cardoso (Portugal), Admir Zahovič (Slovenia)
11 September 2019
17:30

Spain	5–0	Netherlands
Antonio Pérez 6:02; Nito Valle 7:55; Ricardo Mayor 15:40; David Peña 20:54; Adrián Rodríguez 22:49	Report

Arēna Rīga, Riga
Attendance: 270
Referee: Jan Kresta (Czech Republic), Ingus Puriņš (Latvia)

== Knockout stage ==
In the knockout stage, extra time and penalty shoot-out are used to decide the winner if necessary.

=== Bracket ===
Semi-finals
12 September – Riga
Portugal	2 (2)
Croatia (p)	2 (3)
12 September – Riga
Spain	3
Poland	1

Final
14 September – Riga
Croatia	1
Spain	6

=== Semi-finals ===
12 September 2019
17:00

Portugal	2–2 (a.e.t.)	Croatia
Célio Coque 29:29; Nuno Chuva 43:02	Report	Josip Jurlina 38:58; Fran Vukelić 47:15
Penalties
Tomás Paçó (penalty scored); Célio Coque (penalty scored); Hugo Neves (penalty missed)	2–3	(penalty scored) Jakov Mudronja; (penalty scored) Dominik Cvišić; (penalty scored) Josip Jurlina

Arēna Rīga, Riga
Attendance: 250
Referee: Juan José Cordero (Spain), Jan Kresta (Czech Republic)

12 September 2019
20:00

Spain	3–1	Poland
Ricardo Mayor 13:35; Antonio Pérez 18:04 (pen.); Jesús Gordillo 23:51	Report	Tomasz Palonek 11:04

Arēna Rīga, Riga
Attendance: 625
Referee: Cristiano José Cardoso (Portugal), Borislav Kolev (Bulgaria)

=== Final ===
14 September 2019
20:00

Croatia	1–6	Spain
Mateo Mužar 13:00	Report	Ricardo Mayor 5:20; Adrián Rodríguez 14:13, 23:53; Cristian Molina 18:26; Antonio Pérez 19:33 (2pen.); Bernat Povill 22:25

Arēna Rīga, Riga
Attendance: 2 138
Referee: Ingus Puriņš (Latvia), Grigori Ošomkov (Estonia)

== Goalscorers ==
5 goals

- (Spain) Adrián Rodríguez
- (Spain) Antonio Pérez

3 goals

- (Croatia) Božo Sučić
- (Poland) Tomasz Palonek
- (Russia) Pavel Karpov
- (Spain) David Peña
- (Spain) Ricardo Mayor
- (Ukraine) Danylo Bielan

2 goals

- (Croatia) Fran Vukelić
- (Croatia) Jakov Hrstić
- (Poland) Bartosz Borowik
- (Portugal) Célio Coque
- (Portugal) Hugo Neves
- (Portugal) Ricardo Lopes
- (Portugal) Sévio Marcelo
- (Portugal) Tomás Reis
- (Russia) Danil Karpyuk
- (Russia) Denis Titkov
- (Spain) Bernat Povill
- (Spain) Cristian Molina
- (Spain) Jesús Gordillo
- (Ukraine) Denys Blank
- (Ukraine) Oleh Nehela

1 goal

- (Croatia) Filip Petrušić
- (Croatia) Jakov Mudronja
- (Croatia) Josip Jurlina
- (Croatia) Mateo Mužar
- (Croatia) Toni Rendić
- (Latvia) Edgars Tarakanovs
- (Latvia) Toms Grīslis
- (Poland) Jakub Raszkowski
- (Poland) Krzysztof Iwanek
- (Poland) Piotr Matras
- (Portugal) Daniel Costa
- (Portugal) Nuno Chuva
- (Portugal) Rui Moreira
- (Portugal) Tomás Paçó
- (Russia) Kamil Gereykhanov
- (Spain) Nito Valle
- (Ukraine) Eduard Nahornyi
- (Ukraine) Marian Masevych

1 own goal

- (Latvia) Andrejs Iļjins (playing against Portugal)
- (Ukraine) Eduard Volkov (playing against Spain)

== Team of the tournament ==
The UEFA technical observers selected the following 14 players for the team of the tournament:

- (Poland) Krzysztof Iwanek (goalkeeper)
- (Spain) Antonio Navarro (goalkeeper)
- (Spain) Ricardo Mayor
- (Portugal) Tomás Paçó
- (Spain) Alejandro Cerón
- (Croatia) Josip Jurlina
- (Spain) Antonio Pérez
- (Spain) Cristian Molina
- (Spain) Bernat Povill
- (Croatia) Fran Vukelić
- (Spain) David Peña
- (Spain) Jesús Gordillo
- (Spain) Adrián Rodríguez
- (Portugal) Hugo Neves

== Broadcasting ==
=== Television ===
All 15 matches will be live streamed in selected countries (including all unsold markets) and highlights are available for all territories around the world on UEFA.tv.

==== Participating nations ====
Country	Broadcaster
Latvia (host)	LTV
Croatia	Sport Klub
Netherlands	NOS
Poland	TVP
Portugal	RTP
Russia	Match TV
Spain	RTVE
Ukraine	UA:PBC

==== Non-participating European nations ====
Country/Region	Broadcaster
Albania	RTSH
Andorra	RTVE (Spanish)
Armenia	APMTV
Austria	ORF
Other Balkan countries: Bosnia and Herzegovina; Macedonia; Montenegro; Serbia; Slovenia	Sport Klub
Belarus	Belteleradio
Belgium	VRT (Dutch); RTBF (French)
Luxembourg	VRT (Dutch); RTBF (French)
Bulgaria	BNT
Czech Republic	ČT
Denmark	DR
Faroe Islands	DR
Estonia	ERR
Finland	Yle
Germany	Sport1
Hungary	MTVA
Iceland	RÚV
Ireland	RTÉ
Israel	Charlton
Italy	RAI
San Marino	RAI
Vatican City	RAI
Kosovo	RTK
Liechtenstein	SRG SSR
Switzerland	SRG SSR
Lithuania	LRT
Malta	PBS
Norway	NRK
Romania	TVR
Slovakia	RTVS
Sweden	SVT
Turkey	TRT
United Kingdom	BBC

==== Outside Europe ====
Country/Regional	Broadcaster
China	CCTV
Latin American countries: Argentina; Bolivia; Chile; Colombia; Costa Rica; Dominican Republic; Ecuador; El Salvador; Guatemala; Honduras; Mexico; Nicaragua; Panama; Paraguay; Peru; Puerto Rico; Uruguay; Venezuela	ESPN; Univision Deportes (Puerto Rico and USA only)
United States	ESPN; Univision Deportes (Puerto Rico and USA only)
MENA: Algeria; Bahrain; Chad; Comoros; Djibouti; Iran; Iraq; Jordan; Kuwait; Lebanon; Libya; Mauritania; Morocco; Oman; Qatar; Saudi Arabia; Somalia; Palestine; Sudan; Syria; Tunisia; United Arab Emirates; Yemen	beIN Sports

=== Radio ===
==== Participating nations ====
Country	Broadcaster
Latvia (host)	LR
Netherlands	NOS
Poland	PR
Portugal	RTP
Spain	RTVE
Ukraine	UA:PBC

==== Non-participating European nations ====
Country/Region	Broadcaster
Albania	RTSH
Andorra	RTVE (Spanish)
Armenia	HR
Austria	ORF
Belarus	Belteleradio
Belgium	VRT (Dutch); RTBF (French)
Luxembourg	VRT (Dutch); RTBF (French)
Bulgaria	BNR
Czech Republic	ČR
Denmark	DR
Faroe Islands	DR
Estonia	ERR
Finland	Yle
Germany	Sport1
Hungary	MTVA
Iceland	RÚV
Ireland	RTÉ
Italy	RAI
San Marino	RAI
Vatican City	RAI
Kosovo	RTK
Liechtenstein	SRG SSR
Switzerland	SRG SSR
Lithuania	LRT
Malta	PBS
Norway	NRK
Romania	RR
Slovakia	RTVS
Sweden	SR
Turkey	TRT
United Kingdom	BBC

==== Outside Europe ====
Country/Regional	Broadcaster
China	CRI
Latin American countries: Argentina; Bolivia; Chile; Colombia; Costa Rica; Dominican Republic; Ecuador; El Salvador; Guatemala; Honduras; Mexico; Nicaragua; Panama; Paraguay; Peru; Puerto Rico; Uruguay; Venezuela	ESPN; Univision (Puerto Rico and USA only)
United States	ESPN; Univision (Puerto Rico and USA only)
